= 1953 Scottish Cup final =

1953 Scottish Cup Final
- Event: 1952–53 Scottish Cup
| Aberdeen | Rangers |
| 1 | 1 |
| Aberdeen | Rangers |
- Date: 25 April 1953
- Venue: Hampden Park, Glasgow
- Referee: Jack Mowat
- Attendance: 129,761

Replay
| Aberdeen | Rangers |
| 0 | 1 |
- Date: 29 April 1953
- Venue: Hampden Park, Glasgow
- Referee: Jack Mowat
- Attendance: 113,700

The 1953 Scottish Cup Final was played on 25 April 1953 at Hampden Park in Glasgow and was the final of the 68th staging of the Scottish Cup. Aberdeen and Rangers contested the match. The match was drawn 1–1 and was replayed four days later. In the rematch Rangers won 1–0 through a Billy Simpson goal in the 42nd minute.

The victory was Rangers' 14th Scottish Cup win.

== Final ==
25 April 1953

| Rangers | 1 – 1 | Aberdeen |
|---|---|---|
| Prentice 8' | | Yorston 80' |

Hampden Park, Glasgow
Attendance: 129,761
Referee: Jack Mowat

=== Teams ===
RANGERS:
| GK | (Scotland) George Niven |
| RB | (Scotland) George Young (c) |
| LB | (Scotland) John Little |
| RH | (Scotland) Ian McColl |
| CH | (Scotland) Duncan Stanners |
| LH | (Scotland) Jim Pryde |
| RW | (Scotland) Willie Waddell |
| IR | (Scotland) Derek Grierson |
| CF | (Scotland) Willie Paton |
| IL | (Scotland) John Prentice |
| LW | (South Africa) Johnny Hubbard |
Manager:
(Scotland) Bill Struth

ABERDEEN:
| GK | (Scotland) Fred Martin |
| RB | (Scotland) Jimmy Mitchell (c) |
| LB | (Scotland) Davie Shaw |
| RH | (Scotland) Tony Harris |
| CH | (Scotland) Alec Young |
| LH | (Scotland) Jack Allister |
| RW | (Scotland) Ian Rodger |
| IR | (Scotland) Harry Yorston |
| CF | (Scotland) Paddy Buckley |
| IL | (Scotland) George Hamilton |
| LW | (England) Jack Hather |
Manager:
(Scotland) Dave Halliday

=== Replay ===
29 April 1953

| Rangers | 1 – 0 | Aberdeen |
|---|---|---|
| Billy Simpson 42' |

Hampden Park, Glasgow
Attendance: 113,700
Referee: Jack Mowat

=== Teams ===
RANGERS:
| GK | (Scotland) George Niven |
| RB | (Scotland) George Young (c) |
| LB | (Scotland) John Little |
| RH | (Scotland) Ian McColl |
| CH | (Scotland) Willie Woodburn |
| LH | (Scotland) Jim Pryde |
| RW | (Scotland) Willie Waddell |
| IR | (Scotland) Derek Grierson |
| CF | (Northern Ireland) Billy Simpson |
| IL | (Scotland) Willie Paton |
| LW | (South Africa) Johnny Hubbard |
Manager:
(Scotland) Bill Struth

ABERDEEN:
| GK | (Scotland) Fred Martin |
| RB | (Scotland) Jimmy Mitchell (c) |
| LB | (Scotland) Davie Shaw |
| RH | (Scotland) Tony Harris |
| CH | (Scotland) Alec Young |
| LH | (Scotland) Jack Allister |
| RW | (Scotland) Ian Rodger |
| IR | (Scotland) Harry Yorston |
| CF | (Scotland) Paddy Buckley |
| IL | (Scotland) George Hamilton |
| LW | (England) Jack Hather |
Manager:
(Scotland) Dave Halliday
