= Billy Smith (Scottish footballer) =

Scottish footballer

Personal information
- Full name: William Smith
- Date of birth: 6 June 1931
- Place of birth: Aberdeen, Scotland
- Date of death: 24 April 2009 (aged 77)
- Place of death: Vereeniging, South Africa
- Height: 5 ft 10 in (1.78 m)
- Position: Left back

Youth career
- Woodside Thistle

Senior career*
Years	Team	Apps	(Gls)
–	Sunnybank		
1949–1957	Aberdeen	71	(0)
1957–1958	Third Lanark		
1958–1967	Deveronvale		
- * Club domestic league appearances and goals

William Smith (6 June 1931 – 24 April 2009) was a Scottish footballer who played as a left back, primarily for Aberdeen.

He was a regular in the team which won the club's first Scottish Football League championship in the 1954–55 season, although towards the end of that campaign he broke a leg in the semi-final of the Scottish Cup against Clyde, and was out of action for 18 months. He had also played at the same stage in the 1952–53 Scottish Cup to help Aberdeen progress, but was not selected for the final which they lost to Rangers after a replay (the veteran Davie Shaw taking the position in what were his last appearances before retirement). In 1954 the Dons reached the showpiece event again – being defeated by Celtic – but that season David Caldwell was generally first choice.

After being released by Aberdeen in 1957, Smith later played for Third Lanark and for Deveronvale in the Highland League before emigrating to South Africa.

== Career statistics ==
Appearances and goals by club, season and competition
Club	Season	League			Scottish Cup		League Cup		Europe		Total	
Club	Season	Division	Apps	Goals	Apps	Goals	Apps	Goals	Apps	Goals	Apps	Goals
Aberdeen	1951–52	Scottish Division One	4	0	0	0	0	0	0	0	4	0
Aberdeen	1952–53	Scottish Division One	25	0	1	0	4	0	0	0	30	0
Aberdeen	1953–54	Scottish Division One	9	0	0	0	6	0	0	0	15	0
Aberdeen	1954–55	Scottish Division One	25	0	5	0	6	0	0	0	36	0
Aberdeen	1955–56	Scottish Division One	0	0	0	0	0	0	0	0	0	0
Aberdeen	1956–57	Scottish Division One	8	0	0	0	0	0	0	0	8	0
Aberdeen	Total		71	0	6	0	16	0	0	0	93	0
