= 1951–52 Aberdeen F.C. season =

Aberdeen F.C.
1951–52 season
- Chairman: William Mitchell
- Manager: Dave Halliday
- Scottish League Division One: 11th
- Scottish Cup: Quarter-finalists
- Scottish League Cup: Group Stage
- Saint Mungo Cup: Runners-up
- Top goalscorer: League: Harry Yorston (18); All: Harry Yorston (25)
- Highest home attendance: 42,000 vs. Rangers, 29 August
- Lowest home attendance: 6,000 vs. Partick Thistle, 10 November
Home colours

The 1951–52 season was Aberdeen's 40th season in the top flight of Scottish football and their 41st season overall. Aberdeen competed in the Scottish League Division One, Scottish League Cup, and the Scottish Cup.

== Results ==
=== Division A ===
| Match Day | Date | Opponent | H/A | Score | Aberdeen Scorer(s) | Attendance |
|---|---|---|---|---|---|---|
| 1 | 8 September | St Mirren | H | 3–0 | Yorston, Delaney | 18,000 |
| 2 | 15 September | Hibernian | A | 4–4 | Harris, Yorston, Bogan, Lowrie | 30,000 |
| 3 | 22 September | Dundee | H | 3–1 | Hamilton (2), Yorston | 25,000 |
| 4 | 29 September | East Fife | A | 1–2 | Yorston | 10,000 |
| 5 | 6 October | Airdrieonians | H | 1–4 | Yorston | 12,000 |
| 6 | 13 October | Queen of the South | A | 2–1 | Hamilton, Delaney | 10,000 |
| 7 | 20 October | Third Lanark | A | 0–2 | | 4,000 |
| 8 | 3 November | Queen of the South | H | 1–1 | Shaw | 12,000 |
| 9 | 10 November | Partick Thistle | H | 4–2 | Hamilton, Yorston, Baird, Delaney | 6,000 |
| 10 | 17 November | Stirling Albion | A | 4–0 | Baird, Yorston, Delaney, Hamilton | 9,000 |
| 11 | 24 November | Raith Rovers | H | 2–2 | Yorston, Hamilton | 15,000 |
| 12 | 1 December | Heart of Midlothian | A | 2–2 | Yorston (2) | 20,000 |
| 13 | 8 December | Motherwell | A | 3–3 | Baird, Hamilton, Yorston | 7,000 |
| 14 | 15 December | Morton | H | 3–1 | Yorston (2), Boyd | 17,000 |
| 15 | 22 December | St Mirren | A | 1–3 | Hamilton | 7,000 |
| 16 | 29 December | Celtic | A | 3–4 | Baird, Emery (penalty), Yorston | 22,000 |
| 17 | 1 January | Dundee | A | 2–3 | Harris, Emery (penalty) | 26,000 |
| 18 | 2 January | East Fife | H | 2–1 | Boyd, Hamilton | 20,000 |
| 19 | 5 January | Airdrieonians | A | 0–3 | Hay | 10,000 |
| 20 | 12 January | Hibernian | H | 1–2 | Yorston | 20,000 |
| 21 | 19 January | Third Lanark | H | 2–3 | Yorston, Hamilton | 7,000 |
| 22 | 26 January | Heart of Midlothian | H | 3–0 | Rodger (2), Boyd | 16,000 |
| 23 | 2 February | Rangers | A | 2–3 | Prentice, Baird | 25,000 |
| 24 | 16 February | Partick Thistle | A | 4–1 | Yorston (2), Rodger, Boyd | 15,000 |
| 25 | 1 March | Raith Rovers | A | 1–2 | Rodger | 7,000 |
| 26 | 12 March | Stirling Albion | H | 6–0 | Hamilton (2), Rodger (2), Pearson, Emery | 12,000 |
| 27 | 15 March | Motherwell | H | 2–2 | Rodger, Hamilton | 15,000 |
| 28 | 22 March | Morton | A | 2–3 | Boyd, Samuel | 10,000 |
| 29 | 29 March | Celtic | A | 0–2 | | 18,000 |
| 30 | 19 April | Rangers | H | 1–1 | Rodger | 20,000 |

==== Final standings ====
| Pos | Team | Pld | W | D | L | GF | GA | GD | Pts |
|---|---|---|---|---|---|---|---|---|---|
| 9 | Celtic | 30 | 10 | 8 | 12 | 52 | 55 | −3 | 28 |
| 10 | Queen of the South | 30 | 10 | 8 | 12 | 50 | 60 | −10 | 28 |
| 11 | Aberdeen | 30 | 10 | 7 | 13 | 65 | 58 | +7 | 27 |
| 12 | Third Lanark | 30 | 9 | 8 | 13 | 51 | 62 | −11 | 26 |
| 13 | Airdrieonians | 30 | 11 | 4 | 15 | 54 | 69 | −15 | 26 |

Source: RSSSF

=== Scottish League Cup ===
==== Group 4 ====
| Round | Date | Opponent | H/A | Score | Aberdeen Scorer(s) | Attendance |
|---|---|---|---|---|---|---|
| 1 | 11 August | Queen of the South | H | 5–4 | Hay, Hamilton, Emery, Pearson, Delaney | 17,000 |
| 2 | 15 August | Rangers | A | 1–2 | Yorston | 60,000 |
| 3 | 18 August | East Fife | A | 0–3 | | 10,000 |
| 4 | 25 August | Queen of the South | A | 0–2 | | 8,000 |
| 5 | 29 August | Rangers | H | 2–1 | Delaney, Hay | 42,000 |
| 6 | 1 September | East Fife | H | 2–3 | Yorston (2) | 18,000 |

==== Group 4 final table ====
| Team | Pld | W | D | L | GF | GA | GR | Pts |
|---|---|---|---|---|---|---|---|---|
| Rangers | 6 | 4 | 1 | 1 | 15 | 6 | 2.500 | 9 |
| East Fife | 6 | 3 | 1 | 2 | 10 | 9 | 1.111 | 7 |
| Queen of the South | 6 | 2 | 0 | 4 | 11 | 16 | 0.688 | 4 |
| Aberdeen | 6 | 2 | 0 | 4 | 10 | 15 | 0.667 | 4 |

=== Scottish Cup ===
| Round | Date | Opponent | H/A | Score | Aberdeen Scorer(s) | Attendance |
|---|---|---|---|---|---|---|
| R2 | 9 February | Kilmarnock | H | 2–1 | Rodger, Boyd | 19,000 |
| R3 | 23 February | Dundee United | A | 2–2 | Yorston, Baird | 26,000 |
| R3 R | 27 February | Dundee United | H | 3–2 | Yorston (3), Rodger | 30,000 |
| QF | 14 March | Dundee | A | 0–4 | | 40,000 |

=== Saint Mungo Cup ===
| Round | Date | Opponent | H/A | Score | Aberdeen Scorer(s) | Attendance |
|---|---|---|---|---|---|---|
| R1 | 14 July | Rangers | H | 2–1 | Yorston, Baird | 35,000 |
| R2 | 21 July | St Mirren | N | 4–2 | Hamilton (2), Bogan, Baird | 14,000 |
| SF | 25 July | Hibernian | N | 1–1 | Hamilton | 27,000 |
| SF R | 28 July | Hibernian | H | 2–1 | Hamilton, Yorston | 28,000 |
| F | 1 August | Celtic | N | 2–3 | Yorston, Bogan | 80,264 |

== Squad ==
=== Appearances & Goals ===
| No. | Pos | Nat | Player | Total | | Division One | | Scottish Cup | | League Cup | |
| No. | Pos | Nat | Player | Apps | Goals | Apps | Goals | Apps | Goals | Apps | Goals |
|---|---|---|---|---|---|---|---|---|---|---|---|
| | GK | (Scotland) SCO | Fred Martin | 33 | 0 | 23 | 0 | 4 | 0 | 6 | 0 |
| | GK | (Scotland) SCO | Frank Watson | 7 | 0 | 7 | 0 | 0 | 0 | 0 | 0 |
| | DF | (Wales) WAL | Don Emery (c) | 30 | 4 | 20 | 3 | 4 | 0 | 6 | 1 |
| | DF | (Scotland) SCO | Tommy Lowrie | 30 | 1 | 24 | 1 | 0 | 0 | 6 | 0 |
| | DF | (Scotland) SCO | Davie Shaw | 22 | 1 | 14 | 1 | 4 | 0 | 4 | 0 |
| | DF | (Scotland) SCO | Alec Young | 19 | 0 | 19 | 0 | 0 | 0 | 0 | 0 |
| | DF | (Scotland) SCO | Pat McKenna | 12 | 0 | 12 | 0 | 0 | 0 | 0 | 0 |
| | DF | ?? | Alan Rodger | 5 | 0 | 2 | 0 | 0 | 0 | 3 | 0 |
| | DF | (Scotland) SCO | Billy Smith | 4 | 0 | 4 | 0 | 0 | 0 | 0 | 0 |
| | DF | ?? | Johnny Bruce | 0 | 0 | 0 | 0 | 0 | 0 | 0 | 0 |
| | MF | (Scotland) SCO | Tony Harris | 36 | 2 | 26 | 2 | 4 | 0 | 6 | 0 |
| | MF | (Scotland) SCO | Kenny Thomson | 30 | 0 | 20 | 0 | 4 | 0 | 6 | 0 |
| | MF | (Scotland) SCO | Tommy Pearson | 28 | 2 | 20 | 1 | 4 | 0 | 4 | 1 |
| | MF | (Scotland) SCO | Allan Boyd | 20 | 6 | 16 | 5 | 4 | 1 | 0 | 0 |
| | MF | (Scotland) SCO | Jimmy Delaney | 15 | 6 | 10 | 4 | 0 | 0 | 5 | 2 |
| | MF | (Scotland) SCO | Chris Anderson | 15 | 0 | 11 | 0 | 4 | 0 | 0 | 0 |
| | MF | (Scotland) SCO | Tommy Bogan | 7 | 1 | 3 | 1 | 0 | 0 | 4 | 0 |
| | MF | (Scotland) SCO | George Samuel | 4 | 1 | 4 | 1 | 0 | 0 | 0 | 0 |
| | MF | (Scotland) SCO | Doug Newlands | 3 | 0 | 3 | 0 | 0 | 0 | 0 | 0 |
| | MF | (Scotland) SCO | Archie Glen | 0 | 0 | 0 | 0 | 0 | 0 | 0 | 0 |
| | MF | (Scotland) SCO | George McMillan | 0 | 0 | 0 | 0 | 0 | 0 | 0 | 0 |
| | MF | (Scotland) SCO | Jimmy Wallace | 0 | 0 | 0 | 0 | 0 | 0 | 0 | 0 |
| | FW | (Scotland) SCO | Harry Yorston | 37 | 25 | 27 | 19 | 4 | 3 | 6 | 3 |
| | FW | (Scotland) SCO | Archie Baird | 27 | 6 | 23 | 5 | 4 | 1 | 0 | 0 |
| | FW | (Scotland) SCO | George Hamilton | 23 | 14 | 19 | 13 | 0 | 0 | 4 | 1 |
| | FW | ?? | Ian Rodger | 15 | 10 | 11 | 8 | 4 | 2 | 0 | 0 |
| | FW | (England) ENG | Jack Hather | 12 | 0 | 10 | 0 | 0 | 0 | 2 | 0 |
| | FW | (Scotland) SCO | Hugh Hay | 6 | 2 | 2 | 0 | 0 | 0 | 4 | 2 |
| | FW | (Scotland) SCO | Paddy Buckley | 0 | 0 | 0 | 0 | 0 | 0 | 0 | 0 |
| | FW | (Scotland) SCO | Joe O'Neil | 0 | 0 | 0 | 0 | 0 | 0 | 0 | 0 |

=== Unofficial Appearances & Goals ===
| No. | Pos | Nat | Player | Saint Mungo Cup | |
| No. | Pos | Nat | Player | Apps | Goals |
|---|---|---|---|---|---|
| | GK | (Scotland) SCO | Fred Martin | 5 | 0 |
| | DF | (Wales) WAL | Don Emery (c) | 5 | 0 |
| | DF | (Scotland) SCO | Davie Shaw | 5 | 0 |
| | DF | (Scotland) SCO | Tommy Lowrie | 5 | 0 |
| | MF | (Scotland) SCO | Kenny Thomson | 5 | 0 |
| | MF | (Scotland) SCO | Tony Harris | 5 | 0 |
| | MF | (Scotland) SCO | Tommy Bogan | 3 | 2 |
| | MF | (Scotland) SCO | Jimmy Delaney | 2 | 0 |
| | MF | (Scotland) SCO | Tommy Pearson | 2 | 0 |
| | FW | (Scotland) SCO | George Hamilton | 5 | 4 |
| | FW | (Scotland) SCO | Harry Yorston | 5 | 3 |
| | FW | (Scotland) SCO | Archie Baird | 5 | 2 |
| | FW | (England) ENG | Jack Hather | 3 | 0 |
