= 1953–54 Scottish Cup =

Tournament details
- Country: Scotland

Final positions
- Champions: Celtic
- Runners-up: Aberdeen

The 1953–54 Scottish Cup was the 69th staging of Scotland's most prestigious football knockout competition. The Cup was won by Celtic who defeated Aberdeen in the final.

== First round ==
Home team	Score	Away team
Alloa Athletic	1 – 3	Clyde
Berwick Rangers	7 – 0	East Stirlingshire
East Fife	0 – 3	Queen of the South
Fraserburgh	5 – 4	Leith Athletic
Inverness Thistle	3 – 3	Hamilton Academical
Montrose	0 – 1	Peebles Rovers
Greenock Morton	3 – 2	Dundee United
Partick Thistle	1 – 0	Airdrieonians
Rangers	2 – 0	Queen's Park
St Johnstone	1 – 2	Hibernian
St Mirren	1 – 2	Motherwell
Stirling Albion	2 – 1	Dumbarton
Stranraer	1 – 4	Dunfermline Athletic
Third Lanark	2 – 2	Stenhousemuir

=== Replays ===
Home team	Score	Away team
Hamilton Academical	3 – 1	Inverness Thistle
Stenhousemuir	0 – 0	Third Lanark

=== Second replays ===
Home team	Score	Away team
Third Lanark	1 – 0	Stenhousemuir

== Second round ==
Home team	Score	Away team
Albion Rovers	1 – 1	Dundee
Berwick Rangers	5 – 1	Ayr United
Brechin City	2 – 3	Hamilton Academical
Coldstream	1 – 10	Raith Rovers
Duns	0 – 8	Aberdeen
Falkirk	1 – 2	Celtic
Fraserburgh	0 – 3	Hearts
Hibernian	7 – 0	Clyde
Greenock Morton	4 – 0	Cowdenbeath
Motherwell	5 – 2	Dunfermline Athletic
Peebles Rovers	1 – 1	Buckie Thistle
Queen of the South	3 – 0	Forfar Athletic
Rangers	2 – 2	Kilmarnock
Stirling Albion	0 – 0	Arbroath
Tarff Rovers	1 – 9	Partick Thistle
Third Lanark	7 – 2	Deveronvale

=== Replays ===
Home team	Score	Away team
Arbroath	1 – 3	Stirling Albion
Buckie Thistle	7 – 2	Peebles Rovers
Dundee	4 – 0	Albion Rovers
Kilmarnock	1 – 3	Rangers

== Third round ==
Home team	Score	Away team
Berwick Rangers	3 – 0	Dundee
Hamilton Academical	2 – 0	Greenock Morton
Hibernian	1 – 3	Aberdeen
Motherwell	4 – 1	Raith Rovers
Partick Thistle	5 – 3	Buckie Thistle
Queen of the South	1 – 2	Hearts
Stirling Albion	3 – 4	Celtic
Third Lanark	0 – 0	Rangers

=== Replays ===
Home team	Score	Away team
Rangers	4 – 4	Third Lanark

=== Second replays ===
Home team	Score	Away team
Rangers	3 – 2	Third Lanark

== Quarter-finals ==
Home team	Score	Away team
Aberdeen	3 – 0	Hearts
Hamilton Academical	1 – 2	Celtic
Partick Thistle	1 – 1	Motherwell
Rangers	4 – 0	Berwick Rangers

=== Replays ===
Home team	Score	Away team
Motherwell	2 – 1	Partick Thistle

== Semi-finals ==
27 March 1954

Celtic	2–2	Motherwell

Hampden Park, Glasgow
Attendance: 102,424

10 April 1954

Aberdeen	6–0	Rangers
O'Neill 13', 34', 80'; Graham Leggat 70'; Jack Allister 86'; Paddy Buckley 89'

Hampden Park, Glasgow
Attendance: 110,939
Referee: Jack Mowat

=== Replays ===
5 April 1954

Celtic	3–1	Motherwell

Hampden Park, Glasgow
Attendance: 92,600

== Final ==
24 April 1954

Celtic	2–1	Aberdeen
Alec Young 50' (o.g.); Sean Fallon 64'		Paddy Buckley 51'

Hampden Park, Glasgow
Attendance: 130,060
Referee: Charlie Faultless

=== Teams ===
CELTIC:
GK	(Scotland) John Bonnar
RB	(Scotland) Mike Haughney
LB	(Scotland) Frank Meechan
RH	(Scotland) Bobby Evans
CH	(Scotland) Jock Stein (c)
LH	(Northern Ireland) Bertie Peacock
RW	(Scotland) John Higgins
IR	(Scotland) Willie Fernie
CF	(Republic of Ireland) Sean Fallon
IL	(Northern Ireland) Charlie Tully
LW	(Scotland) Neil Mochan
Manager:
(Scotland) Jimmy McGrory

ABERDEEN:
GK	(Scotland) Fred Martin
RB	(Scotland) Jimmy Mitchell (c)
LB	(Scotland) Dave Caldwell
RH	(Scotland) Jack Allister
CH	(Scotland) Alec Young
LH	(Scotland) Archie Glen
RW	(Scotland) Graham Leggat
IR	(Scotland) George Hamilton
CF	(Scotland) Paddy Buckley
IL	(Scotland) Jim Clunie
LW	(England) Jack Hather
Manager:
(Scotland) Dave Halliday

== See also ==
- 1953–54 in Scottish football
- 1953–54 Scottish League Cup
