= 1950–51 Aberdeen F.C. season =

Aberdeen F.C.
1950–51 season
- Chairman: William Mitchell
- Manager: Dave Halliday
- Scottish League Division One: 4th
- Scottish Cup: 3rd Round
- Scottish League Cup: Quarter-finalists
- Top goalscorer: League: Harry Yorston (18); All: Harry Yorston (27)
- Highest home attendance: 52,000 vs. Hibernian, 2 October
- Lowest home attendance: 7,500 vs. East Fife, 7 April
Home colours

The 1950–51 Aberdeen F.C. was 39th consecutive season in the top flight of Scottish football and 40th season overall. Aberdeen competed in the Scottish Football League Division One and Scottish Cup, and the Scottish League Cup.

== Results ==
=== Division A ===
Match Day	Date	Opponent	H/A	Score	Aberdeen Scorer(s)	Attendance
1	9 September	Airdrieonians	A	5–2	Yorston (3), Hamilton, Hather	8,000
2	23 September	Dundee	A	0–2		30,000
3	30 September	Hibernian	H	3–1	Pearson, Hamilton	15,000
4	7 October	St Mirren	A	2–4	Hather, Boyd	10,000
5	14 October	Celtic	H	2–1	Hamilton	30,000
6	21 October	Clyde	H	5–3	Yorston (2), Boyd, Baird, Hather	15,000
7	28 October	Rangers	A	2–1	Boyd, Yorston	50,000
8	4 November	Third Lanark	H	1–2	Hamilton	17,000
9	11 November	Partick Thistle	A	4–1	Yorston (2), Gibb, Anderson,	10,000
10	18 November	Falkirk	H	5–1	Hamilton (4), Baird,	20,000
11	25 November	Raith Rovers	A	0–1		15,000
12	2 December	Heart of Midlothian	H	2–0	Yorston (2)	22,000
13	9 December	Motherwell	H	4–2	Hamilton, Baird, Emery (penalty), Yorston	20,000
14	16 December	Morton	A	2–1	Emery (penalty), Baird	9,000
15	23 December	Airdrieonians	H	1–1	Hamilton	15,000
16	30 December	East Fife	A	0–0		10,000
17	1 January	Dundee	H	1–0	Hamilton	30,000
18	2 January	Hibernian	A	2–6	Hamilton, Pearson	35,000
19	6 January	St Mirren	H	1–1	McNeill	15,000
20	13 January	Celtic	A	4–3	Delaney (2), Yorston, Emery	45,000
21	20 January	Clyde	A	2–0	Hamilton, Yorston	10,000
22	3 February	Rangers	H	2–4	Pearson, Yorston	42,000
23	17 February	Partick Thistle	H	4–1	Yorston (2), Delaney, Hamilton	16,000
24	24 February	Falkirk	A	1–1	Emery	10,500
25	3 March	Raith Rovers	H	1–2	Delaney	15,000
26	17 March	Motherwell	A	1–1	Yorston	10,000
27	24 March	Morton	H	3–0	Delaney, Hamilton, Yorston	15,000
28	7 April	East Fife	H	1–2	Hamilton	7,500
29	18 April	Heart of Midlothian	H	1–4	Baird	20,000
30	28 April	Third Lanark	A	0–2		13,500

==== Final standings ====
Pos	Team	Pld	W	D	L	GF	GA	GD	Pts
3	Dundee	30	15	8	7	47	30	+17	38
4	Heart of Midlothian	30	16	5	9	72	45	+27	37
5	Aberdeen	30	15	5	10	61	50	+11	35
6	Partick Thistle	30	13	7	10	57	48	+9	33
7	Celtic	30	12	5	13	48	46	+2	29

Source: RSSSF

=== Scottish League Cup ===
==== Group 4 ====
Round	Date	Opponent	H/A	Score	Aberdeen Scorer(s)	Attendance
1	12 August	Clyde	H	4–3	Hamilton (2), Anderson, Emery	28,000
2	16 August	Rangers	A	2–1	Hamilton (2)	40,000
3	19 August	Morton	A	2–0	Yorston (2), Boyd	18,000
4	26 August	Clyde	A	1–4	Hamilton	20,000
5	30 August	Rangers	H	2–0	Hather, Baird	42,000
6	2 September	Morton	H	6–1	Yorston (2), Hamilton (2), Baird, Boyd	25,000

==== Group 4 final table ====
Team	Pld	W	D	L	GF	GA	GR	Pts
Aberdeen	6	5	0	1	17	9	1.889	10
Rangers	6	4	0	2	18	7	2.571	8
Clyde	6	1	2	3	15	21	0.714	4
Morton	6	0	2	4	10	23	0.435	2

==== Knockout stage ====
Round	Date	Opponent	H/A	Score	Aberdeen Scorer(s)	Attendance
QF L1	16 September	Hibernian	H	4–1	Hather, Emery, Yorston, Hamilton	42,000
QF L2	20 September	Hibernian	A	1–4	Yorston	35,000
QF R	2 October	Hibernian	H	1–1	Baird	52,000
QF 2R	3 October	Hibernian	N	1–5	Baird	50,000

=== Scottish Cup ===
Round	Date	Opponent	H/A	Score	Aberdeen Scorer(s)	Attendance
R1	27 January	Caledonian	H	6–1	Yorston (3), Baird, Delaney	22,000
R2	10 February	Third Lanark	H	4–0	Hamilton (3), Emery	28,000
R3	10 March	Celtic	A	0–3		75,000

== Squad ==
=== Appearances & Goals ===
No.	Pos	Nat	Player	Total		Division One		Scottish Cup		League Cup	
No.	Pos	Nat	Player	Apps	Goals	Apps	Goals	Apps	Goals	Apps	Goals
	GK	(Scotland) SCO	Fred Martin	36	0	24	0	2	0	10	0
	GK	(Scotland) SCO	Frank Watson	4	0	3	0	1	0	0	0
	GK	(Scotland) SCO	Johnny Curran	3	0	3	0	0	0	0	0
	DF	(Scotland) SCO	Alec Young	38	0	26	0	3	0	9	0
	DF	(Wales) WAL	Don Emery (c)	37	7	25	4	2	1	10	2
	DF	(Scotland) SCO	Davie Shaw	35	0	23	0	2	0	10	0
	DF	(Scotland) SCO	Pat McKenna	15	0	13	0	2	0	0	0
	DF	(Scotland) SCO	Tommy Lowrie	5	0	5	0	0	0	0	0
	DF	(Scotland) SCO	Ralph McKenzie	1	0	0	0	0	0	1	0
	DF	??	Johnny Bruce	1	0	1	0	0	0	0	0
	DF	??	Alan Rodger	0	0	0	0	0	0	0	0
	MF	(Scotland) SCO	Tony Harris	34	0	23	0	3	0	8	0
	MF	(Scotland) SCO	Chris Anderson	33	2	20	1	3	0	10	1
	MF	(Scotland) SCO	Jimmy Delaney	24	5	21	4	3	1	0	0
	MF	(Scotland) SCO	Tommy Pearson	23	3	19	3	3	0	1	0
	MF	(Scotland) SCO	Allan Boyd	20	5	10	3	0	0	10	2
	MF	(Scotland) SCO	Archie Glen	8	0	7	0	0	0	1	0
	MF	(Scotland) SCO	Kenny Thomson	4	0	4	0	0	0	0	0
	MF	(Scotland) SCO	Jimmy Stenhouse	2	0	2	0	0	0	0	0
	MF	(Scotland) SCO	Tommy Bogan	2	0	1	0	1	0	0	0
	MF	(Scotland) SCO	Eric Bakie	2	0	1	0	0	0	1	0
	MF	(Scotland) SCO	George McMillan	1	0	1	0	0	0	0	0
	MF	(Scotland) SCO	Jimmy Wallace	0	0	0	0	0	0	0	0
	FW	(Scotland) SCO	Harry Yorston	42	26	29	18	3	3	10	5
	FW	(Scotland) SCO	George Hamilton	40	29	28	17	2	4	10	8
	FW	(Scotland) SCO	Archie Baird	40	10	27	5	3	1	10	4
	FW	(England) ENG	Jack Hather	19	5	10	3	0	0	9	2
	FW	(Scotland) SCO	Ian McNeil	2	1	2	1	0	0	0	0
	FW	(Scotland) SCO	Joe O'Neil	1	0	1	0	0	0	0	0
	FW	??	Ian Rodger	1	0	1	0	0	0	0	0
	FW	(Scotland) SCO	Hugh Hay	0	0	0	0	0	0	0	0
