= 1956–57 Aberdeen F.C. season =

Aberdeen F.C.
1956–57 season
- Chairman: William Mitchell
- Manager: Davie Shaw
- Scottish League Division One: 6th
- Scottish Cup: 5th Round
- Scottish League Cup: 3rd in Group Stage
- Top goalscorer: League: Graham Leggat (12); All: Graham Leggat (16)
- Highest home attendance: 35,000 vs. Celtic, 11 August 1956 vs. Rangers, 18 August 1956
- Lowest home attendance: 5,000 vs. Raith Rovers, 6 March 1957
Home colours

The 1956–57 season was Aberdeen's 45th season in the top flight of Scottish football and their 46th season overall. Aberdeen competed in the Scottish League Division One, Scottish League Cup, and the Scottish Cup

== Results ==
=== Division 1 ===
Match Day	Date	Opponent	H/A	Score	Aberdeen Scorer(s)	Attendance
1	8 September	St Mirren	A	2–0	Hather, Buckley	15,000
2	15 September	Queen's Park	H	2–1	Hather, Buckley	12,000
3	22 September	Dundee	A	2–4	Yorston, Buckley	20,000
4	29 September	Hibernian	H	3–1	Glen (2), Buckley	18,000
5	6 October	East Fife	A	3–4	Hather, Davidson, Wishart	7,000
6	13 October	Airdrieonians	H	2–3	Leggat, Davidson	17,000
7	20 October	Ayr United	A	6–1	Allen (3), Mulhall, Hay, Yorston	8,000
8	3 November	Raith Rovers	A	2–3	Wishart, Allen	7,000
9	10 November	Kilmarnock	H	1–3	Boyd	11,000
10	17 November	Dunfermline Athletic	H	3–2	Hay (2), Boyd	13,000
11	24 November	Rangers	A	1–3	Yorston	30,000
12	1 December	Queen of the South	H	5–1	Leggat (2), Buckley, Yorston, Wishart	12,000
13	8 December	Queen's Park	A	2–0	Buckley, Wishart	12,000
14	15 December	Falkirk	A	5–2	Yorston (2), Hather, Buckley, Leggat	6,000
15	22 December	Motherwell	H	2–3	Yorston, Wishart	13,000
16	29 December	Heart of Midlothian	H	2–3	Wishart, Buckley	20,000
17	1 January	Dundee	H	2–1	Brown, Buckley	15,000
18	2 January	Partick Thistle	A	2–1	Wright (Own goal), Hather	10,000
19	5 January	St Mirren	H	4–0	Hay (2), Davidson, Glen	13,000
20	12 January	Hibernian	A	1–4	Leggat	18,000
21	19 January	East Fife	H	1–0	Davidson	14,000
22	26 January	Airdrieonians	A	5–1	Leggat (3), Yorston, Davidson	5,000
23	9 February	Ayr United	H	2–2	Wishart, Davidson	12,000
24	23 February	Celtic	A	1–2	Allister	10,000
25	6 March	Raith Rovers	H	1–0	Leggat	5,000
26	9 March	Kilmarnock	A	1–2	Hather	11,000
27	16 March	Dunfermline Athletic	A	3–1	Leggat, Wishart, Allister	11,000
28	23 March	Rangers	A	1–2	Davidson	28,000
29	30 March	Queen of the South	A	2–2	Leggat, Wishart	6,000
30	13 April	Falkirk	H	3–1	Allister (3)	10,000
31	20 April	Motherwell	A	5–2	Davidson (2), Leggat, Hather, Allister	2,000
32	22 April	Celtic	H	0–1		15,000
33	24 April	Partick Thistle	H	2–0	Glen, Davidson	7,500
34	27 April	Heart of Midlothian	A	0–3		15,000

==== Final standings ====
Pos	Team	Pld	W	D	L	GF	GA	GR	Pts
4	Raith Rovers	34	16	7	11	84	58	1.448	39
5	Celtic	34	15	8	11	58	43	1.349	38
6	Aberdeen	34	18	2	14	79	59	1.339	38
7	Motherwell	34	16	5	13	72	66	1.091	37
8	Partick Thistle	34	13	8	13	53	51	1.039	34

Source: RSSSF

=== Scottish League Cup ===
==== Group 2 ====
Round	Date	Opponent	H/A	Score	Aberdeen Scorer(s)	Attendance
1	11 August	Celtic	H	1–2	Yorston	35,000
2	15 August	East Fife	A	1–2	Hather	8,000
3	18 August	Rangers	H	2–6	Wishart, Yorston	35,000
4	25 August	Celtic	A	2–3	Leggat, Davidson	25,000
5	29 August	East Fife	H	4–1	Leggat (2), Hay, Hather	17,000
6	1 September	Rangers	A	1–4	Davidson	35,000

==== Group 2 final table ====
Team	Pld	W	D	L	GF	GA	GR	Pts
Celtic	6	5	1	0	10	5	2.000	11
Rangers	6	4	1	1	18	6	3.000	9
Aberdeen	6	1	0	5	11	18	0.611	2
East Fife	6	1	0	5	5	15	0.333	2

=== Scottish Cup ===
Round	Date	Opponent	H/A	Score	Aberdeen Scorer(s)	Attendance
R4	2 February	Hibernian	A	4–3	Wishart (2), Leggat, Yorston	27,300
R5	16 February	Falkirk	A	1–3	Davidson	16,600

== Squad ==
=== Appearances & Goals ===
No.	Pos	Nat	Player	Total		Division One		Scottish Cup		League Cup	
No.	Pos	Nat	Player	Apps	Goals	Apps	Goals	Apps	Goals	Apps	Goals
	GK	(Scotland) SCO	Fred Martin	28	0	26	0	0	0	2	0
	GK	(Scotland) SCO	Reg Morrison	14	0	8	0	2	0	4	0
	DF	(Scotland) SCO	Dave Caldwell	37	0	33	0	2	0	2	0
	DF	(Scotland) SCO	Alec Young	30	0	26	0	0	0	4	0
	DF	(Scotland) SCO	Jimmy Mitchell (c)	27	0	19	0	2	0	6	0
	DF	(Scotland) SCO	Jack Allister	24	6	20	6	0	0	4	0
	DF	(Scotland) SCO	Jim Clunie	12	0	10	0	2	0	0	0
	DF	(Scotland) SCO	Jimmy Hogg	12	0	8	0	0	0	4	0
	DF	(Scotland) SCO	Billy Smith	8	0	8	0	0	0	0	0
	DF	(Scotland) SCO	Ian MacFarlane	0	0	0	0	0	0	0	0
	MF	(Scotland) SCO	Archie Glen	37	4	29	4	2	0	6	0
	MF	(Scotland) SCO	Bob Wishart	34	12	29	9	2	2	3	1
	MF	(Scotland) SCO	Graham Leggat	31	16	24	12	2	1	5	3
	MF	(Scotland) SCO	Ken Brownlee	11	0	9	0	0	0	2	0
	MF	(Scotland) SCO	Bobby Wilson	11	0	7	0	2	0	2	0
	MF	(Scotland) SCO	Allan Boyd	9	2	8	2	0	0	1	0
	MF	(Scotland) SCO	Jimmy Wallace	6	0	6	0	0	0	0	0
	MF	??	John Ward	6	0	6	0	0	0	0	0
	MF	(Scotland) SCO	George Mulhall	2	1	2	1	0	0	0	0
	FW	(England) ENG	Jack Hather	40	9	32	7	2	0	6	2
	FW	(Scotland) SCO	Harry Yorston	27	11	20	8	1	1	6	2
	FW	(Scotland) SCO	Norman Davidson	23	13	17	10	2	1	4	2
	FW	(Scotland) SCO	Paddy Buckley	15	9	13	9	0	0	2	0
	FW	(Scotland) SCO	Hugh Hay	9	6	5	5	1	0	3	1
	FW	(Scotland) SCO	John Brown	5	1	5	1	0	0	0	0
	FW	(Scotland) SCO	Johnny Allan	4	4	4	4	0	0	0	0
