= 1952–53 Aberdeen F.C. season =

Aberdeen F.C.
1952–53 season
- Chairman: William Mitchell
- Manager: Dave Halliday
- Scottish League Division One: 11th
- Scottish Cup: Finalists
- Scottish League Cup: Group Stage
- Coronation Cup: First Round
- Top goalscorer: League: George Hamilton (15); All: Jack Hather (18)
- Highest home attendance: 41,880 vs. Hibernian, 18 March
- Lowest home attendance: 15,000 vs. Airdrieonians, 13 September vs. Clyde 13 December
Home colours

The 1952–53 season was Aberdeen's 41st season in the top flight of Scottish football and their 42nd season overall. Aberdeen competed in the Scottish League Division One, Scottish League Cup, and the Scottish Cup.

== Results ==
=== Division A ===
| Match Day | Date | Opponent | H/A | Score | Aberdeen Scorer(s) | Attendance |
|---|---|---|---|---|---|---|
| 1 | 6 September | Partick Thistle | A | 1–1 | Rodger | 15,000 |
| 2 | 13 September | Airdrieonians | H | 1–2 | Yorston | 15,000 |
| 3 | 20 September | Dundee | A | 1–3 | Hay | 20,000 |
| 4 | 26 September | Celtic | H | 2–2 | Boyd, Hamilton | 25,000 |
| 5 | 4 October | St Mirren | A | 1–2 | Hather | 12,000 |
| 6 | 11 October | Third Lanark | H | 4–3 | Hamilton (2), Hather (2) | 17,000 |
| 7 | 18 October | Airdrieonians | A | 7–4 | Buckley (2), Hamilton (2), Hather (2), Hay | 7,000 |
| 8 | 25 October | East Fife | H | 6–3 | Boyd (3), Hamilton (2), Buckley | 20,000 |
| 9 | 1 November | Motherwell | H | 5–1 | Hay (2), Hamilton (2), Buckley | 20,000 |
| 10 | 8 November | Raith Rovers | A | 1–2 | Buckley | 5,000 |
| 11 | 15 November | Heart of Midlothian | H | 3–0 | Hather (2), Hamilton | 15,500 |
| 12 | 22 November | Falkirk | H | 7–2 | Hay (2), Buckley (2), Hather (2), Boyd | 17,000 |
| 13 | 29 November | Queen of the South | A | 0–4 | | 8,000 |
| 14 | 6 December | Rangers | A | 0–4 | | 35,000 |
| 15 | 13 December | Clyde | H | 3–2 | Hather, Allister, Buckley | 15,000 |
| 16 | 20 December | Partick Thistle | H | 4–2 | Hamilton (3), Buckley | 18,000 |
| 17 | 27 December | Hibernian | A | 0–3 | | 20,000 |
| 18 | 1 January | Dundee | H | 2–2 | Rodger, Yorston | 21,000 |
| 19 | 10 January | St Mirren | H | 1–2 | Hay | 20,000 |
| 20 | 17 January | Third Lanark | A | 1–0 | Hather | 10,000 |
| 21 | 24 January | Clyde | A | 0–3 | | 12,000 |
| 22 | 14 February | East Fife | A | 1–4 | Yorston | 6,000 |
| 23 | 20 February | Raith Rovers | H | 0–2 | | 20,000 |
| 24 | 7 March | Heart of Midlothian | A | 1–3 | Hay | 20,000 |
| 25 | 21 March | Queen of the South | H | 4–0 | Rodger (2), Yorston, Allister (penalty) | 16,000 |
| 26 | 28 March | Rangers | H | 2–2 | Yorston, Rodger | 28,000 |
| 27 | 11 April | Hibernian | H | 1–1 | Hather | 20,000 |
| 28 | 15 April | Celtic | A | 3–1 | Hamilton (2), Yorston | 10,000 |
| 29 | 17 April | Motherwell | A | 1–4 | Hather | 11,000 |
| 30 | 20 April | Falkirk | A | 1–4 | Hather | 7,500 |

==== Final standings ====
| Pos | Team | Pld | W | D | L | GF | GA | GR | Pts |
|---|---|---|---|---|---|---|---|---|---|
| 9 | Partick Thistle | 30 | 10 | 9 | 11 | 55 | 63 | 0.873 | 29 |
| 10 | Queen of the South | 30 | 10 | 8 | 12 | 43 | 61 | 0.705 | 28 |
| 11 | Aberdeen | 30 | 11 | 5 | 14 | 64 | 68 | 0.941 | 27 |
| 12 | Raith Rovers | 30 | 9 | 8 | 13 | 47 | 53 | 0.887 | 26 |
| 13 | Falkirk | 30 | 11 | 4 | 15 | 53 | 63 | 0.841 | 26 |

Source: RSSSF

=== Scottish League Cup ===
==== Group 3 ====
| Round | Date | Opponent | H/A | Score | Aberdeen Scorer(s) | Attendance |
|---|---|---|---|---|---|---|
| 1 | 9 August | Motherwell | A | 2–5 | Yorston, Buckley | 8,000 |
| 2 | 13 August | Heart of Midlothian | H | 2–4 | Ewen, Yorston | 33,000 |
| 3 | 16 August | Rangers | A | 1–3 | Buckley | 40,000 |
| 4 | 23 August | Motherwell | H | 0–1 | | 25,000 |
| 5 | 27 August | Heart of Midlothian | A | 1–1 | Hather | 22,000 |
| 6 | 30 August | Rangers | H | 1–2 | Yorston | 35,000 |

==== Group 3 final table ====
| Team | Pld | W | D | L | GF | GA | GR | Pts |
|---|---|---|---|---|---|---|---|---|
| Rangers | 6 | 4 | 1 | 1 | 12 | 10 | 1.200 | 9 |
| Heart of Midlothian | 6 | 3 | 1 | 2 | 12 | 7 | 1.714 | 7 |
| Motherwell | 6 | 3 | 1 | 2 | 11 | 9 | 1.222 | 7 |
| Aberdeen | 6 | 0 | 1 | 5 | 7 | 16 | 0.438 | 1 |

=== Scottish Cup ===
| Round | Date | Opponent | H/A | Score | Aberdeen Scorer(s) | Attendance |
|---|---|---|---|---|---|---|
| R2 | 7 February | St Mirren | H | 2–0 | Hather (2) | 22,294 |
| R3 | 21 February | Motherwell | H | 5–5 | Buckley (2), Allister (2), Yorston | 27,735 |
| R3 R | 25 February | Motherwell | A | 6–1 | Yorston (3), Rodger, Buckley, Hather | 20,193 |
| QF | 14 March | Hibernian | A | 1–1 | Rodger | 47,585 |
| QF R | 18 March | Hibernian | H | 2–0 | Hamilton (2) | 41,880 |
| SF | 4 April | Third Lanark | N | 1–1 | Buckley | 19,905 |
| SF R | 8 April | Third Lanark | N | 2–1 | Yorston (2) | 25,219 |
| F | 25 April | Rangers | N | 1–1 | Yorston | 113,700 |
| F R | 29 April | Rangers | N | 0–1 | | 113,700 |

=== Coronation Cup ===
| Round | Date | Opponent | H/A | Score | Aberdeen Scorer(s) | Attendance |
|---|---|---|---|---|---|---|
| QF | 13 May | Newcastle United | N | 0–4 | | 12,000 |

== Squad ==
=== Appearances & Goals ===
| No. | Pos | Nat | Player | Total | | Division One | | Scottish Cup | | League Cup | |
| No. | Pos | Nat | Player | Apps | Goals | Apps | Goals | Apps | Goals | Apps | Goals |
|---|---|---|---|---|---|---|---|---|---|---|---|
| | GK | (Scotland) SCO | Fred Martin | 42 | 0 | 28 | 0 | 9 | 0 | 5 | 0 |
| | GK | (Scotland) SCO | Reg Morrison | 2 | 0 | 2 | 0 | 0 | 0 | 0 | 0 |
| | GK | (Scotland) SCO | Frank Watson | 1 | 0 | 0 | 0 | 0 | 0 | 1 | 0 |
| | DF | (Scotland) SCO | Jimmy Mitchell (c) | 43 | 0 | 29 | 0 | 9 | 0 | 5 | 0 |
| | DF | (Scotland) SCO | Jack Allister | 34 | 4 | 25 | 2 | 9 | 2 | 0 | 0 |
| | DF | (Scotland) SCO | Alec Young | 32 | 0 | 23 | 0 | 9 | 0 | 0 | 0 |
| | DF | (Scotland) SCO | Billy Smith | 30 | 0 | 25 | 0 | 1 | 0 | 4 | 0 |
| | DF | (Scotland) SCO | Davie Shaw | 24 | 0 | 13 | 0 | 8 | 0 | 3 | 0 |
| | DF | (Scotland) SCO | Jock Pattillo | 1 | 0 | 0 | 0 | 0 | 0 | 1 | 0 |
| | MF | (Scotland) SCO | Tony Harris | 38 | 0 | 24 | 0 | 9 | 0 | 5 | 0 |
| | MF | (Scotland) SCO | Allan Boyd | 15 | 5 | 12 | 5 | 0 | 0 | 3 | 0 |
| | MF | (Scotland) SCO | Chris Anderson | 7 | 0 | 4 | 0 | 0 | 0 | 3 | 0 |
| | MF | (Scotland) SCO | Kenny Thomson | 6 | 0 | 0 | 0 | 0 | 0 | 6 | 0 |
| | MF | (Scotland) SCO | Jimmy Wallace | 6 | 0 | 4 | 0 | 0 | 0 | 2 | 0 |
| | MF | (Scotland) SCO | Archie Glen | 5 | 0 | 5 | 0 | 0 | 0 | 0 | 0 |
| | MF | (Scotland) SCO | Tommy Pearson | 2 | 0 | 2 | 0 | 0 | 0 | 0 | 0 |
| | MF | (Scotland) SCO | George Samuel | 1 | 0 | 0 | 0 | 0 | 0 | 1 | 0 |
| | FW | (England) ENG | Jack Hather | 43 | 18 | 28 | 14 | 9 | 3 | 6 | 1 |
| | FW | (Scotland) SCO | Paddy Buckley | 40 | 15 | 27 | 9 | 9 | 4 | 4 | 2 |
| | FW | (Scotland) SCO | Harry Yorston | 32 | 16 | 19 | 6 | 9 | 7 | 4 | 3 |
| | FW | ?? | Ian Rodger | 31 | 7 | 17 | 5 | 9 | 2 | 5 | 0 |
| | FW | (Scotland) SCO | George Hamilton | 24 | 17 | 18 | 15 | 6 | 2 | 0 | 0 |
| | FW | (Scotland) SCO | Hugh Hay | 20 | 8 | 17 | 8 | 3 | 0 | 0 | 0 |
| | FW | (Scotland) SCO | Archie Baird | 6 | 0 | 2 | 0 | 0 | 0 | 4 | 0 |
| | FW | (Scotland) SCO | Ian McNeil | 4 | 0 | 3 | 0 | 0 | 0 | 1 | 0 |
| | FW | ?? | Jack Dunbar | 4 | 0 | 2 | 0 | 0 | 0 | 2 | 0 |
| | FW | (Scotland) SCO | Ernie Ewen | 2 | 1 | 1 | 0 | 0 | 0 | 1 | 1 |

=== Unofficial Appearances & Goals ===
| No. | Pos | Nat | Player | Coronation Cup | |
| No. | Pos | Nat | Player | Apps | Goals |
|---|---|---|---|---|---|
| | GK | (Scotland) SCO | Fred Martin | 1 | 0 |
| | DF | (Scotland) SCO | Jimmy Mitchell (c) | 1 | 0 |
| | DF | (Scotland) SCO | Davie Shaw | 1 | 0 |
| | DF | (Scotland) SCO | Jack Allister | 1 | 0 |
| | DF | (Scotland) SCO | Alec Young | 1 | 0 |
| | MF | (Scotland) SCO | Tony Harris | 1 | 0 |
| | MF | (Scotland) SCO | Allan Boyd | 1 | 0 |
| | FW | (England) ENG | Jack Hather | 1 | 0 |
| | FW | (Scotland) SCO | Paddy Buckley | 1 | 0 |
| | FW | (Scotland) SCO | George Hamilton | 1 | 0 |
| | FW | (Scotland) SCO | Harry Yorston | 1 | 0 |
