= 1955–56 Aberdeen F.C. season =

Aberdeen F.C.
1955–56 season
- Chairman: William Mitchell
- Coach: Davie Shaw
- Scottish League Division One: 2nd
- Scottish Cup: 5th Round
- Scottish League Cup: Champion
- Top goalscorer: League: Graham Leggat (19); All: Graham Leggat (29)
- Highest home attendance: 38,000 vs. Celtic, 7 January 1956
- Lowest home attendance: 11,000 vs. Kilmarnock, 11 April 1956
Home colours

The 1955–56 season was Aberdeen's 44th season in the top flight of Scottish football and their 45th season overall. Aberdeen competed in the Scottish League Division One, Scottish League Cup, and the Scottish Cup

== Results ==
=== Division 1 ===
Match Day	Date	Opponent	H/A	Score	Aberdeen Scorer(s)	Attendance
1	10 September	Hibernian	H	6–2	Buckley (3), Leggat (2), Yorston	17,000
2	24 September	Dundee	H	2–0	Hather, Glen (penalty)	20,000
3	8 October	Queen of the South	A	3–2	Clunie (penalty), Hather, Buckley	17,000
4	15 October	St Mirren	A	3–0	Davidson (2), Wishart	15,000
5	29 October	East Fife	A	1–1	Ingram	10,000
6	5 November	Clyde	H	1–4	Davidson	15,000
7	12 November	Dunfermline Athletic	A	2–2	Hather, Yorston	10,000
8	19 November	Motherwell	H	1–1	Bobby Wilson	20,000
9	26 November	Raith Rovers	A	1–1	Buckley	12,000
10	3 December	Heart of Midlothian	A	0–3		30,000
11	10 December	Rangers	H	0–0		20,000
12	17 December	Kilmarnock	A	0–1		15,000
13	24 December	Airdrieonians	H	7–2	Hather (2), Wishart, Glen, Yorston, Allen, Leggat	18,000
14	31 December	Falkirk	A	6–3	Allen (3), Leggat (2), Hather	15,500
15	2 January	Dundee	A	4–2	Glen (penalty), Leggat, Yorston, Hather	29,000
16	3 January	Stirling Albion	H	7–0	Allen (4), Leggat, Hather, Allister	25,000
17	7 January	Celtic	H	2–1	Leggat	38,000
18	14 January	Hibernian	A	3–1	Wishart (2), Boyd	18,000
19	28 January	Queen of the South	A	2–2	Yorston, Glen (penalty)	10,000
20	11 February	St Mirren	H	4–1	Leggat (2), Allen, Mulhall	15,500
21	18 February	Falkirk	H	2–2	Wishart, Yorston	16,000
22	25 February	Stirling Albion	A	2–0	Boyd, Yorston	5,500
23	3 March	East Fife	H	7–3	Hather (2), Leggat (2), Wishart, Hather, Allen	15,000
24	10 March	Clyde	A	5–0	Leggat (2), Yorston, Allen, Wishart	14,500
25	17 March	Dunfermline Athletic	H	1–0	Leggat	17,000
26	24 March	Motherwell	A	1–1	Wishart	10,000
27	31 March	Raith Rovers	H	3–5	Boyd (2), Leggat	18,000
28	7 April	Heart of Midlothian	H	4–1	Leggat (3), Boyd	20,000
29	10 April	Celtic	A	1–1	Yorston	14,000
30	18 April	Rangers	A	0–1		45,000
31	21 April	Kilmarnock	H	3–2	Buckley, Yorston, Mulhall	11,000
32	25 April	Airdrieonians	A	2–2	Yorston, Mulhall	15,000
33	28 April	Partick Thistle	H	0–4		16,000
34	30 April	Partick Thistle	A	2–0	Davidson (2)	9,500

==== Final standings ====
Pos	Team	Pld	W	D	L	GF	GA	GR	Pts
1	Rangers	34	22	8	4	85	27	3.148	52
2	Aberdeen	34	18	10	6	87	50	1.740	46
3	Heart of Midlothian	34	19	7	8	99	47	2.106	45
4	Hibernian	34	19	7	8	86	50	1.720	45
5	Celtic	34	16	9	9	55	39	1.410	41

Source: RSSSF

=== Scottish League Cup ===
==== Group 3 ====
Round	Date	Opponent	H/A	Score	Aberdeen Scorer(s)	Attendance
1	13 August	Hibernian	A	1–0	Buckley	30,000
2	17 August	Dunfermline Athletic	H	3–2	Mulhall, Yorston, Leggat	24,000
3	20 August	Clyde	H	3–2	Wishart, Glen (penalty), Buckley	24,000
4	27 August	Hibernian	H	2–1	Buckley, O'Neil	30,000
5	31 August	Dunfermline Athletic	H	2–2	Buckley (2)	14,000
6	3 September	Clyde	A	2–1	Leggat (2)	8,000

==== Group 3 final table ====
Team	Pld	W	D	L	GF	GA	GR	Pts
Aberdeen	6	5	1	0	13	8	1.625	11
Hibernian	6	3	1	2	11	8	1.375	7
Dunfermline Athletic	6	1	1	4	12	16	0.750	3
Clyde	6	1	1	4	11	15	0.733	3

==== Knockout stage ====
Round	Date	Opponent	H/A	Score	Aberdeen Scorer(s)	Attendance
QF L1	14 September	Hearts	H	5–3	Leggat (3), Buckley (2)	30,000
QF L2	17 September	Hearts	A	4–2	Hather (2), Yorston, Leggat	35,000
SF	1 October	Rangers	N	2–1	Leggat, Wishart	80,000
F	22 October	St Mirren	N	2–1	Mallan (own goal), Leggat	44,106

=== Scottish Cup ===
Round	Date	Opponent	H/A	Score	Aberdeen Scorer(s)	Attendance
R5	4 February	Rangers	A	1–2	Leggat	50,000

== Squad ==
=== Appearances & Goals ===
No.	Pos	Nat	Player	Total		Division One		Scottish Cup		League Cup	
No.	Pos	Nat	Player	Apps	Goals	Apps	Goals	Apps	Goals	Apps	Goals
	GK	(Scotland) SCO	Fred Martin	43	0	32	0	1	0	10	0
	GK	(Scotland) SCO	Reg Morrison	2	0	2	0	0	0	0	0
	DF	(Scotland) SCO	Dave Caldwell	37	0	27	0	1	0	9	0
	DF	(Scotland) SCO	Jimmy Mitchell (c)	34	0	24	0	0	0	10	0
	DF	(Scotland) SCO	Jack Allister	25	0	22	0	1	0	2	0
	DF	(Scotland) SCO	Jim Clunie	21	1	14	1	0	0	7	0
	DF	(Scotland) SCO	Ian MacFarlane	17	0	16	0	1	0	0	0
	DF	(Scotland) SCO	Alec Young	15	0	12	0	0	0	3	0
	DF	(Scotland) SCO	Bobby Paterson	6	0	5	0	0	0	1	0
	DF	(Scotland) SCO	Billy Smith	0	0	0	0	0	0	0	0
	DF	(Scotland) SCO	Jimmy Hogg	0	0	0	0	0	0	0	0
	MF	(Scotland) SCO	Bob Wishart	42	10	31	8	1	0	10	2
	MF	(Scotland) SCO	Archie Glen	38	5	27	4	1	0	10	1
	MF	(Scotland) SCO	Graham Leggat	29	29	18	19	1	1	10	9
	MF	(Scotland) SCO	Bobby Wilson	18	1	13	1	0	0	5	0
	MF	(Scotland) SCO	Allan Boyd	13	4	13	4	0	0	0	0
	MF	(Scotland) SCO	George Mulhall	12	4	7	3	0	0	5	1
	MF	(Scotland) SCO	Ken Brownlee	10	0	9	0	1	0	0	0
	MF	(Scotland) SCO	Jimmy Ingram	2	1	2	1	0	0	0	0
	MF	(Scotland) SCO	Teddy Scott	1	0	1	0	0	0	0	0
	FW	(Scotland) SCO	Harry Yorston	40	14	31	12	1	0	8	2
	FW	(England) ENG	Jack Hather	30	13	24	11	1	0	5	2
	FW	(Scotland) SCO	Paddy Buckley	20	13	10	6	0	0	10	7
	FW	(Scotland) SCO	Johnny Allan	18	11	17	11	1	0	0	0
	FW	(Scotland) SCO	Norman Davidson	8	5	8	5	0	0	0	0
	FW	(Scotland) SCO	Hugh Hay	6	0	6	0	0	0	0	0
	FW	(Scotland) SCO	Ian McNeill	4	0	2	0	0	0	2	0
	FW	(Scotland) SCO	Joe O'Neil	3	1	0	0	0	0	3	1
	FW	(Scotland) SCO	George Kelly	1	0	1	0	0	0	0	0
