= 1954–55 Aberdeen F.C. season =

Aberdeen F.C.
1954–55 season
- Chairman: William Mitchell
- Manager: Dave Halliday
- Scottish League Division One: Champion
- Scottish Cup: Semi-finalists
- Scottish League Cup: Group Stage
- Top goalscorer: League: Paddy Buckley (17); All: Paddy Buckley (29)
- Highest home attendance: 44,467 vs. Rangers, 19 February 1955
- Lowest home attendance: 10,000 vs. Raith Rovers, 23 April 1955
Home colours

The 1954–55 season was Aberdeen's 43rd season in the top flight of Scottish football and their 44th season overall. Aberdeen competed in the Scottish Football League Division One, Scottish League Cup, and the Scottish Cup.

== Results ==
=== Division A ===
Match Day	Date	Opponent	H/A	Score	Aberdeen Scorer(s)	Attendance
1	11 September	Stirling Albion	H	5–0	O'Neil (2), Buckley, Wallace, Yorston	17,000
2	18 September	Dundee	A	2–0	Glen (penalty), O'Neil	27,000
3	25 September	Hibernian	H	3–1	Yorston (2), O'Neil	30,000
4	2 October	Motherwell	A	3–1	Yorston, Leggat, Hather	12,000
5	9 October	Celtic	H	0–2		38,000
6	16 October	St Mirren	A	4–0	Wishart (2), Glen (penalty), Hamilton	15,000
7	23 October	East Fife	H	4–1	Hather, Allister, Buckley, Yorston	14,500
8	30 October	Partick Thistle	A	0–1		20,000
9	6 November	Queen of the South	H	2–0	Buckley, Glen (penalty)	15,000
10	13 November	Raith Rovers	A	2–1	Allister, Yorston	11,000
11	20 November	Heart of Midlothian	H	1–0	Yorston	28,000
12	27 November	Falkirk	H	1–0	Hather	17,000
13	4 December	Kilmarnock	A	4–0	Buckley (2), Leggat (2)	12,000
14	11 December	Rangers	A	1–3	Buckley	50,500
15	18 December	Clyde	H	3–0	Wishart, Allister (penalty), Yorston	17,000
16	25 December	Stirling Albion	A	4–3	Leggat, Yorston, Hather, Wishart	3,500
17	1 January	Dundee	H	1–0	Wishart	25,000
18	3 January	Hibernian	A	1–0	Buckley	30,000
19	8 January	Motherwell	H	4–1	Buckley (2), Leggat (2)	22,000
20	22 January	St Mirren	H	2–1	Hather, Brown	18,000
21	29 January	East Fife	A	1–1	Leggat	9,000
22	12 February	Partick Thistle	H	4–0	Hather (2), Buckley, Allister	14,000
23	26 February	Queen of the South	A	6–2	Buckley (2), Yorston (2), Hather, Hamilton	9,000
24	12 March	Heart of Midlothian	A	0–2		28,000
25	19 March	Falkirk	A	2–1	Wishart, Hather	17,000
26	30 March	Kilmarnock	H	4–1	Leggat (2), Yorston, Wishart	16,500
27	2 April	Rangers	H	4–0	Buckley (3), Leggat	32,000
28	9 April	Clyde	A	1–0	Glen (penalty)	15,000
29	16 April	Celtic	A	1–2	Leggat	35,000
30	23 April	Raith Rovers	H	3–2	Buckley (2), Hather	10,000

==== Final standings ====
Pos	Team	Pld	W	D	L	GF	GA	GD	Pts	Qualification
1	Aberdeen (C)	30	24	1	5	73	26	+47	49	
2	Celtic	30	19	8	3	76	37	+39	46	
3	Rangers	30	19	3	8	67	33	+34	41	
4	Hearts	30	16	7	7	74	45	+29	39	
5	Hibernian	30	15	4	11	64	54	+10	34	Invitation for the European Cup first round

Source: RSSSF
(C) Champions

=== Scottish League Cup ===
==== Group 2 ====
Round	Date	Opponent	H/A	Score	Aberdeen Scorer(s)	Attendance
1	14 August	Queen of the South	H	4–0	Leggat (2), Hather, Buckley	18,000
2	18 August	Hibernian	A	0–2		23,000
3	21 August	East Fife	A	3–0	O'Neil, Buckley, Hather	15,000
4	28 August	Queen of the South	A	0–3		10,000
5	1 September	Hibernian	H	1–1	Hamilton	30,000
6	4 September	East Fife	H	5–1	Buckley (4), Hather	28,000

==== Group 2 final table ====
Team	Pld	W	D	L	GF	GA	GR	Pts
East Fife	6	4	0	2	13	11	1.182	8
Aberdeen	6	3	1	2	13	7	1.857	7
Hibernian	6	3	1	2	13	10	1.300	7
Queen of the South	6	1	0	5	8	19	0.421	2

=== Scottish Cup ===
Round	Date	Opponent	H/A	Score	Aberdeen Scorer(s)	Attendance
R5	5 February	Stirling Albion	A	6–0	Yorston (2), Hather (2), Buckley (2)	7,568
R6	19 February	Rangers	H	2–1	Hather, Wishart	44,647
QF	5 March	Heart of Midlothian	A	1–1	Allister	48,723
QFR	9 March	Heart of Midlothian	H	2–0	Buckley, Yorston	41,345
SF	26 March	Clyde	N	2–2	Buckley (2)	32,590
SFR	4 April	Clyde	N	0–1		28,304

== Squad ==
=== Appearances & Goals ===
No.	Pos	Nat	Player	Total		Division One		Scottish Cup		League Cup	
No.	Pos	Nat	Player	Apps	Goals	Apps	Goals	Apps	Goals	Apps	Goals
	GK	(Scotland) SCO	Fred Martin	40	0	28	0	6	0	6	0
	GK	(Scotland) SCO	Reg Morrison	2	0	2	0	0	0	0	0
	GK	(Scotland) SCO	Danny Mowatt	0	0	0	0	0	0	0	0
	DF	(Scotland) SCO	Jimmy Mitchell (c)	40	0	29	0	5	0	6	0
	DF	(Scotland) SCO	Alec Young	40	0	30	0	6	0	4	0
	DF	(Scotland) SCO	Billy Smith	36	0	25	0	5	0	6	0
	DF	(Scotland) SCO	Jack Allister	32	5	21	4	6	1	5	0
	DF	(Scotland) SCO	Dave Caldwell	7	0	5	0	2	0	0	0
	DF	(Scotland) SCO	Jim Clunie	2	0	0	0	0	0	2	0
	DF	(Scotland) SCO	Bobby Paterson	1	0	1	0	0	0	0	0
	DF	(Scotland) SCO	Ian MacFarlane	0	0	0	0	0	0	0	0
	DF	(Scotland) SCO	Dave Aitken	0	0	0	0	0	0	0	0
	MF	(Scotland) SCO	Archie Glen	42	4	30	4	6	0	6	0
	MF	(Scotland) SCO	Graham Leggat	36	13	26	11	5	0	5	2
	MF	(Scotland) SCO	Bob Wishart	29	8	23	7	6	1	0	0
	MF	(Scotland) SCO	Jimmy Wallace	6	1	5	1	0	0	1	0
	MF	(Scotland) SCO	Allan Boyd	0	0	0	0	0	0	0	0
	MF	(Scotland) SCO	Teddy Scott	0	0	0	0	0	0	0	0
	MF	(Scotland) SCO	Doug Newlands	0	0	0	0	0	0	0	0
	MF	United States	Crawford Clelland	0	0	0	0	0	0	0	0
	MF	(Scotland) SCO	Bobby Wilson	0	0	0	0	0	0	0	0
	MF	(Scotland) SCO	Jimmy Ingram	0	0	0	0	0	0	0	0
	FW	(England) ENG	Jack Hather	42	15	30	9	6	3	6	3
	FW	(Scotland) SCO	Paddy Buckley	40	28	28	17	6	5	6	6
	FW	(Scotland) SCO	Harry Yorston	36	15	28	12	6	3	2	0
	FW	(Scotland) SCO	Joe O'Neil	16	5	12	4	0	0	4	1
	FW	(Scotland) SCO	George Hamilton	11	3	4	2	1	0	6	1
	FW	(Scotland) SCO	Jimmy Brown	4	1	3	1	0	0	1	0
	FW	(Scotland) SCO	Hugh Hay	0	0	0	0	0	0	0	0
	FW	(Scotland) SCO	George Kelly	0	0	0	0	0	0	0	0
	FW	(Scotland) SCO	Ian McNeill	0	0	0	0	0	0	0	0
	FW	(Scotland) SCO	Ivor Smith	0	0	0	0	0	0	0	0
	FW	(Scotland) SCO	Johnny Allan	0	0	0	0	0	0	0	0
	FW	??	Jack Dunbar	0	0	0	0	0	0	0	0
