= Alec Young =

Scottish footballer and coach

Personal information
- Full name: Alexander Young
- Date of birth: 20 October 1925
- Place of birth: Glasgow, Scotland
- Date of death: 2 March 2010 (aged 84)
- Place of death: Fortrose, Scotland
- Position: Centre-half

Senior career*
Years	Team	Apps	(Gls)
–	Kilsyth Rangers		
–	Blantyre Victoria		
1950–1958	Aberdeen	168	(1)
1958–1964	Ross County		
- * Club domestic league appearances and goals

Alexander Young (20 October 1925 – 2 March 2010) was a Scottish footballer and coach. He played at centre-half for the league-winning Aberdeen team of 1954–55, and was inducted into the Aberdeen FC "Hall of Fame" as one of the founding members in 2003.

== Playing career ==
Young began his playing career in junior football in the West of Scotland, playing for Kilsyth Rangers and Blantyre Victoria – with whom he won a Scottish Junior Cup in 1950 – before signing for Aberdeen at the relatively late age of 24. He was a mainstay of the successful Aberdeen side of the 1950s, playing in every game of the league championship season in 1954–55, and appearing in two Scottish Cup finals, in 1953 and 1954. In the second of these finals, Young scored an own goal to open the scoring for Celtic, who went on to win 2–1.

Young never appeared for the Scotland national team, despite being a highly regarded defender, and having captained the junior international side. Archie Glen, one of Young's teammates in the league-winning side, considered him to be one of that side's more under-rated players:

People still speak about his famous sliding tackle, but he could do more than that. The fans were not in a position to know that Alec was an extremely thoughtful person, always concerned for the people around him.

Young left Aberdeen in 1958, moving to Ross County, then in the Highland League, where he served as player-coach until retiring on medical advice in 1964.

He went on to run a grocery shop in Fortrose.

== Career statistics ==
=== Appearances and goals by club, season and competition ===
Club	Season	League			Scottish Cup		League Cup		Europe		Total	
Club	Season	Division	Apps	Goals	Apps	Goals	Apps	Goals	Apps	Goals	Apps	Goals
Aberdeen	1950-51	Scottish Division One	26	0	3	0	9	0	0	0	38	0
Aberdeen	1951-52	Scottish Division One	19	0	0	0	0	0	0	0	19	0
Aberdeen	1952-53	Scottish Division One	23	0	9	0	0	0	0	0	32	0
Aberdeen	1953-54	Scottish Division One	27	1	5	0	4	0	0	0	36	1
Aberdeen	1954-55	Scottish Division One	30	0	6	0	4	0	0	0	40	0
Aberdeen	1955-56	Scottish Division One	12	0	0	0	3	0	0	0	15	0
Aberdeen	1956-57	Scottish Division One	26	0	0	0	4	0	0	0	30	0
Aberdeen	1957-58	Scottish Division One	5	0	0	0	6	0	0	0	11	0
Aberdeen	Total		168	1	23	0	30	0	0	0	221	1
