= 1957–58 Aberdeen F.C. season =

Aberdeen F.C.
1957–58 season
- Chairman: William Mitchell
- Manager: Davie Shaw
- Scottish League Division One: 12th
- Scottish Cup: Quarter-final
- Scottish League Cup: Quarter-final
- Top goalscorer: League: Norman Davidson (17); All: Norman Davidson (27)
- Highest home attendance: 22,000 vs. Queen of the South, 10 August 1957
- Lowest home attendance: 7,000 vs. Raith Rovers, 22 March 1958
Home colours

The 1957–58 season was Aberdeen's 46th season in the top flight of Scottish football and their 47th season overall. Aberdeen competed in the Scottish League Division One, Scottish League Cup, and the Scottish Cup

== Results ==
=== Division 1 ===
Match Day	Date	Opponent	H/A	Score	Aberdeen Scorer(s)	Attendance
1	7 September	Hibernian	H	0–1		18,000
2	21 September	Dundee	H	3–0	Davidson (2), Wishart	10,000
3	28 September	St Mirren	A	1–3	Boyd	9,000
4	5 October	Airdrieonians	H	5–1	Hay (3), Davidson (2)	10,000
5	12 October	Airdrieonians	A	6–2	Leggat (5), Little	7,000
6	19 October	Heart of Midlothian	A	0–4	Hather (2), Ewan	30,000
7	26 October	Partick Thistle	H	1–3	Little	12,500
8	2 November	Falkirk	A	4–4	Wishart, Ewan, Glen, Hather	12,000
9	9 November	Queen's Park	H	5–2	Davidson (3), Ewan, Wishart	10,000
10	16 November	Third Lanark	A	1–3	Davidson	9,000
11	23 November	Kilmarnock	H	1–2	Wishart	11,000
12	30 November	Raith Rovers	A	1–0	Brownlee	7,000
13	7 December	Clyde	H	2–1	Davidson, Hather	11,000
14	14 December	Motherwell	A	1–4	Hather	8,000
15	21 December	Queen of the South	A	2–1	Davidson	4,000
16	28 December	Rangers	H	1–2	Hogg	21,000
17	1 January	Dundee	A	2–1	Hogg, Ewan	18,000
18	2 January	East Fife	H	6–2	Hather (3), Wishart, Davidson, Hogg	11,000
19	4 January	Hibernian	A	1–0	Ewan	14,000
20	11 January	St Mirren	H	3–1	Hather, Hogg, Glen	11,000
21	18 January	Celtic	A	1–1	Ewan	20,000
22	1 February	Partick Thistle	A	0–1		10,000
23	22 February	Falkirk	H	1–2	Hatcher	12,000
24	5 March	Queen's Park	A	5–2	Leggat, Ewan, Wishart, Little	1,000
25	8 March	Third Lanark	H	2–4	Wallace, Ewan	10,000
26	19 March	Kilmarnock	A	0–2		8,000
27	22 March	Raith Rovers	H	3–2	Mulhall, Davidson, Hay	7,000
28	29 March	Clyde	A	1–5	Davidson	9,000
29	5 April	Celtic	H	0–1		13,000
30	9 April	Motherwell	H	4–3	Davidson (3), Little	11,000
31	12 April	Queen of the South	H	3–4	Ward, Burns, Hather	8,000
32	16 April	Heart of Midlothian	H	0–4		12,000
33	21 April	East Fife	A	2–3	Wishart, Davidson	6,000
34	26 April	Rangers	A	0–5		10,000

==== Final standings ====
Pos	Team	Pld	W	D	L	GF	GA	GR	Pts
10	Falkirk	34	11	9	14	64	82	0.780	31
11	Dundee	34	13	5	16	49	65	0.754	31
12	Aberdeen	34	14	2	18	68	76	0.895	30
13	St Mirren	34	11	8	15	59	66	0.894	30
14	Third Lanark	34	13	4	17	69	88	0.784	30

Source: RSSSF

=== Scottish League Cup ===
==== Group 1 ====
Round	Date	Opponent	H/A	Score	Aberdeen Scorer(s)	Attendance
1	10 August	Queen of the South	H	5–1	Leggat (2), Wishart, Davidson, Hather	22,000
2	14 August	Falkirk	A	4–3	Burns (2), Leggat, Davidson	8,000
3	17 August	Motherwell	A	3–2	Davidson (3)	6,000
4	24 August	Queen of the South	A	3–2	Davidson (2), Leggat	5,000
5	28 August	Falkirk	H	2–1	Davidson, Allister	11,500
6	31 August	Motherwell	H	5–3	Leggat (3), Burns	18,000

==== Group 1 final table ====
Team	Pld	W	D	L	GF	GA	GR	Pts
Aberdeen	6	6	0	0	22	12	1.833	12
Falkirk	6	2	1	3	13	11	1.182	5
Motherwell	6	2	0	4	11	17	0.647	4
Queen of the South	6	1	1	4	8	14	0.571	3

==== Knockout stage ====
Round	Date	Opponent	H/A	Score	Aberdeen Scorer(s)	Attendance
QF L1	11 September	Clyde	H	1–2	Boyd	18,000
QF L2	14 September	Clyde	A	2–4	Boyd, Davidson	15,000

=== Scottish Cup ===
Round	Date	Opponent	H/A	Score	Aberdeen Scorer(s)	Attendance
R2	15 February	Morton	A	1–0	Wishart	10,000
R3	1 March	Dundee	A	3–1	Wishart (2), Leggat	24,532
QF	15 March	Motherwell	A	3–1	Davidson	19,000

== Squad ==
=== Appearances & Goals ===
No.	Pos	Nat	Player	Total		Division One		Scottish Cup		League Cup	
No.	Pos	Nat	Player	Apps	Goals	Apps	Goals	Apps	Goals	Apps	Goals
	GK	(Scotland) SCO	Reg Morrison	27	0	24	0	3	0	0	0
	GK	(Scotland) SCO	Fred Martin	18	0	10	0	0	0	8	0
	DF	(Scotland) SCO	Dave Caldwell	37	0	26	0	3	0	8	0
	DF	(Scotland) SCO	Jimmy Hogg	36	0	27	0	2	0	7	0
	DF	(Scotland) SCO	Jim Clunie	30	0	25	0	3	0	2	0
	DF	(Scotland) SCO	Jimmy Walker	12	0	11	0	1	0	0	0
	DF	(Scotland) SCO	Jack Allister	11	1	3	0	0	0	8	1
	DF	(Scotland) SCO	Alec Young	11	0	5	0	0	0	6	0
	DF	(Scotland) SCO	Jimmy Mitchell	3	0	2	0	0	0	1	0
	DF	(Scotland) SCO	Willie Clydedale	2	0	2	0	0	0	0	0
	MF	(Scotland) SCO	Bob Wishart	38	11	27	7	3	3	8	1
	MF	(Scotland) SCO	Archie Glen (c)	36	2	26	2	3	0	7	0
	MF	(Scotland) SCO	Ken Brownlee	32	1	28	1	3	0	1	0
	MF	(Scotland) SCO	Dickie Ewen	25	7	23	7	2	0	0	0
	MF	(Scotland) SCO	Graham Leggat	24	15	15	7	3	1	6	7
	MF	(Scotland) SCO	Ian Burns	20	5	13	1	0	0	7	4
	MF	(Scotland) SCO	Allan Boyd	9	3	7	1	0	0	2	2
	MF	??	John Ward	6	1	6	1	0	0	0	0
	MF	(Scotland) SCO	George Mulhall	5	1	4	1	0	0	1	0
	MF	(Scotland) SCO	Jimmy Wallace	5	1	5	1	0	0	0	0
	FW	(England) ENG	Jack Hather	40	10	30	9	3	0	7	1
	FW	(Scotland) SCO	Norman Davidson	38	27	28	17	2	1	8	9
	FW	(Scotland) SCO	Billy Hogg	14	4	13	4	1	0	0	0
	FW	(Scotland) SCO	Billy Little	10	4	8	4	1	0	1	0
	FW	(Scotland) SCO	Hugh Hay	6	4	6	4	0	0	0	0
