= Tony Harris (footballer) =

Scottish footballer

Personal information
- Full name: John Robert Harris
- Date of birth: 18 October 1922
- Place of birth: Maryhill, Glasgow
- Date of death: 25 August 2000 (aged 77)
- Place of death: Glasgow, Scotland
- Height: 5 ft 9 in (1.75 m)
- Positions: Outside right; right half

Senior career*
Years	Team	Apps	(Gls)
–	Viewfield Rovers		
1940–1946	Queen's Park		
1946–1954	Aberdeen	188	(18)
1954–1956	Airdrieonians	21	(0)
Total		209	(18)

International career
1945	Scotland (wartime)	1	(0)
- * Club domestic league appearances and goals

John Robert "Tony" Harris (18 October 1922 – 25 August 2000) was a Scottish professional footballer who played for Queen's Park, Aberdeen and Airdrieonians.

== Football career ==
Harris began his career with amateur club Queen's Park during the Second World War. He had briefly served in the RAF and Royal Navy during the War, but was sent back to university when it was discovered that he was a dental student, dentists being in short supply during the War. He also played for Scotland in one wartime international.

In 1946, Harris joined Aberdeen and was part of the team that won the club's first major honour, the 1947 Scottish Cup. He also played in the 1953 Scottish Cup Final for Aberdeen, but they were defeated by Rangers.

After leaving Aberdeen, Harris signed for Airdrieonians and played there for two seasons before retiring in 1956.

== After football ==
In 1969, Harris was part of a consortium attempting to take over Aberdeen F.C., along with fellow ex-Aberdeen player Don Emery. The takeover bid was ultimately unsuccessful.

He died in August 2000, aged 77.

== Career statistics ==
=== Club ===
Appearances and goals by club, season and competition
Club	Season	League			Scottish Cup		League Cup		Total	
Club	Season	Division	Apps	Goals	Apps	Goals	Apps	Goals	Apps	Goals
Queens Park	1939–40	League football cancelled due to the Second World War								
Queens Park	1940–41	League football cancelled due to the Second World War								
Queens Park	1941–42	League football cancelled due to the Second World War								
Queens Park	1942–43	League football cancelled due to the Second World War								
Queens Park	1943–44	League football cancelled due to the Second World War								
Queens Park	1944–45	League football cancelled due to the Second World War								
Queens Park	1945–46	League football cancelled due to the Second World War								
Queens Park	Total		-	-	-	-	-	-	-	-
Aberdeen	1946–47	Scottish Division One	28	10	7	3	10	1	45	14
Aberdeen	1947–48	Scottish Division One	28	4	2	2	7	0	37	6
Aberdeen	1948–49	Scottish Division One	26	1	1	0	6	4	33	5
Aberdeen	1949–50	Scottish Division One	28	1	5	0	6	2	39	3
Aberdeen	1950–51	Scottish Division One	23	0	3	0	8	0	34	0
Aberdeen	1951–52	Scottish Division One	26	2	4	0	6	0	36	2
Aberdeen	1952–53	Scottish Division One	24	0	9	0	5	0	38	0
Aberdeen	1953–54	Scottish Division One	5	0	0	0	6	0	11	0
Aberdeen	Total		188	18	31	5	54	7	273	30
Airdrieonians	1954–55	Scottish Division Two								
Airdrieonians	1955–56	Scottish Division One								
Airdrieonians	Total		21	0					21+	0+
Career total			209	18	31+	5+	54+	7+	294+	30+

== Honours ==
Aberdeen

- Scottish Cup: 1947
