= 1948–49 Aberdeen F.C. season =

Aberdeen F.C.
1948–49 season
- Chairman: William Mitchell
- Manager: Dave Halliday
- Scottish League Division One: 13th
- Scottish Cup: 1st Round
- Scottish League Cup: Group Stage
- Top goalscorer: League: George Hamilton (10); All: George Hamilton (15)
- Highest home attendance: 42,000 vs. Rangers, 12 February
- Lowest home attendance: 10,000 vs. Partick Thistle, 26 February
Home colours

The 1948–49 season was Aberdeen's 37th season in the top flight of Scottish football and their 38th season competed in the Scottish League First Division, Scottish League Cup, and the Scottish Cup.

== Results ==
=== Division A ===
Match Day	Date	Opponent	H/A	Score	Aberdeen Scorer(s)	Attendance
1	14 August	Third Lanark	A	0–1		20,000
2	18 August	Celtic	H	1–0	Williams	35,000
3	21 August	Dundee	A	0–4		30,000
4	28 August	Motherwell	H	2–0	Kelly, Hamilton	35,000
5	31 August	St Mirren	A	1–3	Kelly	15,000
6	4 September	Hibernian	H	1–2	Baird	35,000
7	23 October	Clyde	H	4–4	Kiddie, Hamilton, Pearson, Williams	20,000
8	6 November	Falkirk	H	1–4	Pearson	15,000
9	13 November	Partick Thistle	A	0–0		15,000
10	20 November	East Fife	H	3–1	Kelly (3)	20,000
11	4 December	Heart of Midlothian	H	2–2	Hamilton, Harris	20,000
12	11 December	Queen of the South	H	1–2	Kelly	15,000
13	18 December	Morton	A	1–1	Hamilton	14,000
14	25 December	Celtic	A	0–3		40,000
15	1 January	Dundee	H	1–3	Rice	26,000
16	8 January	Third Lanark	H	2–2	Rice, Hamilton	20,000
17	15 January	Hibernian	A	1–4	Hamilton	15,500
18	29 January	St Mirren	H	0–2		18,000
19	12 February	Rangers	H	0–2		42,000
20	19 February	Falkirk	A	2–1	Williams, Emery (penalty)	10,000
21	26 February	Partick Thistle	H	4–2	Emery (2), Williams, Hather,	10,000
22	5 March	Albion Rovers	A	1–2	Glen	750
23	12 March	Albion Rovers	H	4–0	Emery (2), Hather, Williams	15,000
24	19 March	Heart of Midlothian	A	1–1	Hather	20,000
25	26 March	Queen of the South	A	0–0		4,000
26	2 April	Morton	H	0–0		20,000
27	9 April	Clyde	A	0–0		9,000
28	16 April	Rangers	A	1–1	Hather	35,000
29	20 April	East Fife	A	4–1	Hamilton (3), Williams	8,000
30	30 April	Motherwell	A	1–1	Hamilton	8,500

==== Final League table ====
P	Team	Pld	W	D	L	GF	GA	GD	Pts
12	Motherwell	30	10	5	15	44	49	−5	25
13	Aberdeen	30	7	11	12	39	48	−9	25
14	Clyde	30	9	6	15	50	67	−17	24

=== Scottish League Cup ===
==== Group Section D ====
Round	Date	Opponent	H/A	Score	Aberdeen Scorer(s)	Attendance
1	11 September	St Mirren	H	3–1	Hamilton (2), Harris	25,000
2	18 September	Third Lanark	A	1–1	Williams	17,000
3	25 September	Morton	H	3–1	Hamilton (2), Stenhouse	20,000
4	2 October	St Mirren	A	1–1	Harris	17,000
5	9 October	Third Lanark	H	2–4	Pearson (penalty), Harris	12,000
6	16 October	Morton	A	1–3	Harris	15,000

==== Section D Final Table ====
P	Team	Pld	W	D	L	GF	GA	GD	Pts
1	St Mirren	6	2	2	2	12	9	1.33	6
2	Aberdeen	6	2	2	2	11	11	1.00	6
3	Third Lanark	6	2	2	2	12	13	0.92	6
4	Morton	6	2	2	2	9	11	0.82	6

=== Scottish Cup ===
Round	Date	Opponent	H/A	Score	Aberdeen Scorer(s)	Attendance
R1	22 January	Third Lanark	A	1–2	Hamilton	26,000

== Squad ==
=== Appearances & Goals ===
No.	Pos	Nat	Player	Total		Division One		Scottish Cup		League Cup	
No.	Pos	Nat	Player	Apps	Goals	Apps	Goals	Apps	Goals	Apps	Goals
	GK	(Scotland) SCO	George Johnstone	22	0	15	0	1	0	6	0
	GK	(Scotland) SCO	Johnny Curran	14	0	14	0	0	0	0	0
	GK	(Scotland) SCO	Frank Watson	1	0	1	0	0	0	0	0
	GK	(Scotland) SCO	Fred Martin	0	0	0	0	0	0	0	0
	DF	(Scotland) SCO	Willie Waddell	32	0	25	0	1	0	6	0
	DF	(Scotland) SCO	Pat McKenna (c)	31	0	26	0	1	0	4	0
	DF	(Wales) WAL	Don Emery	18	5	15	5	0	0	3	0
	DF	(Scotland) SCO	Bobby Ancell	16	0	15	0	1	0	0	0
	DF	(Scotland) SCO	Willie Roy	13	0	13	0	0	0	0	0
	DF	(Scotland) SCO	Allan Massie	13	0	8	0	0	0	5	0
	DF	(Scotland) SCO	Hugh McVean	5	0	5	0	0	0	0	0
	DF	(South Africa) SOU	Jimmy Preston	1	0	1	0	0	0	0	0
	DF	(Scotland) SCO	Frank Dunlop	0	0	0	0	0	0	0	0
	DF	(Scotland) SCO	Armour Ashe	0	0	0	0	0	0	0	0
	DF	(England) ENG	Ben Robson	0	0	0	0	0	0	0	0
	MF	(Scotland) SCO	Tony Harris	33	5	26	1	1	0	6	4
	MF	(Scotland) SCO	Jimmy Stenhouse	23	1	17	0	0	0	6	1
	MF	(Scotland) SCO	Tommy Pearson	22	3	15	2	1	0	6	1
	MF	(Scotland) SCO	Joe McLaughlin	22	0	19	0	0	0	3	0
	MF	(Scotland) SCO	Peter Rice	17	2	16	2	1	0	0	0
	MF	(Scotland) SCO	Kenny Thomson	9	0	3	0	0	0	6	0
	MF	(Scotland) SCO	Chris Anderson	8	0	7	0	1	0	0	0
	MF	(Scotland) SCO	Willie Millar	5	0	4	0	0	0	1	0
	MF	(Scotland) SCO	Archie Glen	4	1	4	1	0	0	0	0
	MF	(Scotland) SCO	Alex Kiddie	2	1	2	1	0	0	0	0
	MF	(South Africa) SOU	Ray Botha	1	0	0	0	0	0	1	0
	MF	(England) ENG	Ken Findlay	0	0	0	0	0	0	0	0
	MF	(Scotland) SCO	George Merchant	0	0	0	0	0	0	0	0
	MF	(Scotland) SCO	Willie Rob	0	0	0	0	0	0	0	0
	MF	??	Alex Martin	0	0	0	0	0	0	0	0
	FW	(South Africa) SOU	Stan Williams	31	7	26	6	1	0	4	1
	FW	(Scotland) SCO	George Hamilton	26	15	19	10	1	1	6	4
	FW	(England) ENG	Jack Hather	15	4	14	4	1	0	0	0
	FW	(Scotland) SCO	Archie Kelly	13	6	11	6	0	0	2	0
	FW	(Scotland) SCO	Archie Baird	7	1	7	1	0	0	0	0
	FW	(Scotland) SCO	Freddie Smith	2	0	1	0	0	0	1	0
	FW	(England) ENG	Bob Gibson	1	0	1	0	0	0	0	0
	FW	(Scotland) SCO	Harry Yorston	0	0	0	0	0	0	0	0
	FW	??	Jimmy Muir	0	0	0	0	0	0	0	0
