= Norrie Davidson =

Scottish footballer (1934–2022)

Personal information
- Full name: Norman Davidson
- Date of birth: 25 October 1934
- Place of birth: Kintore, Scotland
- Date of death: 20 November 2022 (aged 88)
- Height: 5 ft 7 in (1.70 m)
- Position: Centre-forward

Youth career
- Inverurie Old Boys
- 1951–1953: Chelsea

Senior career*
Years	Team	Apps	(Gls)
1953	Fraserburgh		
1953–1955	Inverurie Locos		
1955–1961	Aberdeen	109	(55)
1961–1963	Heart of Midlothian	36	(19)
1963–1964	Dundee United	8	(3)
1964	Partick Thistle	9	(2)
1964–1965	St Mirren	1	(0)
1965	Margate	4	(0)
1966	Ramsgate		
1966–1967	Boksburg		
Total		167	(79)
- * Club domestic league appearances and goals

Norman Davidson (25 October 1934 – 20 November 2022) was a Scottish footballer who played as a centre-forward.

== Career ==
Davidson was born in Kintore, Aberdeenshire, and after a period as a teenager with Chelsea which did not result in any senior appearances, returned home and started his career with local junior club, Inverurie Loco Works.

Six months after signing for Aberdeen, he made his professional debut in October 1955, and went on to make 146 appearances for the club in major competitions, including the 1959 Scottish Cup Final, but moved to Heart of Midlothian in early 1961. While with the Tynecastle club he befriended Willie Hamilton, who provided the cross for Davidson to score the winning goal in the 1962 Scottish League Cup Final (he had also found the net in the previous year's event which resulted in defeat).

Davidson joined Dundee United in October 1963 for a £4,000 transfer fee, but soon left to join Partick Thistle in January 1964, having been swapped for Partick's George Smith. He later played for St Mirren and English non-League clubs Margate and Ramsgate, and had a spell in South Africa. After retiring, he worked at a bus depot in Edinburgh for many years.

On 21 November 2022, it was announced that Davidson had died, at the age of 88.

== Career statistics ==
Appearances and goals by club, season and competition
Club	Season	League			National Cup		League Cup		Europe		Total	
Club	Season	Division	Apps	Goals	Apps	Goals	Apps	Goals	Apps	Goals	Apps	Goals
Aberdeen	1955–56	Scottish Division One	8	5	0	0	0	0	0	0	8	5
Aberdeen	1956–57	Scottish Division One	17	10	2	1	4	2	0	0	23	13
Aberdeen	1957–58	Scottish Division One	28	17	2	1	8	9	0	0	38	27
Aberdeen	1958–59	Scottish Division One	19	5	7	6	4	1	0	0	30	12
Aberdeen	1959–60	Scottish Division One	23	11	3	5	2	1	0	0	28	17
Aberdeen	1960–61	Scottish Division One	14	7	0	0	5	3	0	0	19	10
Aberdeen	Total		109	55	14	13	23	16	0	0	146	84
Heart of Midlothian	1960–61	Scottish Division One	6	2	1	0	0	0	0	0	7	2
Heart of Midlothian	1961–62	Scottish Division One	8	3	0	0	3	1	1	2	12	6
Heart of Midlothian	1962–63	Scottish Division One	13	10	1	0	9	4	0	0	23	14
Heart of Midlothian	1963–64	Scottish Division One	9	4	0	0	5	3	2	0	16	7
Heart of Midlothian	Total		36	19	2	0	17	8	3	2	58	29
Dundee United	1963–64	Scottish Division One	8	3	1	0	0	0	0	0	9	3
Partick Thistle	1963–64	Scottish Division One	0	0	0	0	0	0	0	0	0	0
Partick Thistle	1964–65	Scottish Division One	9	2	–	–	–	–	–	–	9+	2+
Partick Thistle	Total		9	2	-	-	-	-	-	-	9+	2+
St Mirren	1964–65	Scottish Division One	1	0	0	0	0	0	0	0	1	0
Margate	1965–66	Southern League Premier Division	4	0	0	0	–	–	–	–	4	0
Career total			167	79	17+	13+	40+	24+	3	2	227+	118+
