= 1953–54 Aberdeen F.C. season =

Aberdeen F.C.
1953–54 season
- Chairman: William Mitchell
- Manager: Dave Halliday
- Scottish League Division One: 9th
- Scottish Cup: Finalists
- Scottish League Cup: Group Stage
- Top goalscorer: League: Paddy Buckley (17); All: Paddy Buckley (27)
- Highest home attendance: 30,000 vs. Celtic, 22 August East Fife, 29 August
- Lowest home attendance: 10,000 vs. Falkirk, 17 March
Home colours

The 1953–54 season was Aberdeen's 42nd season in the top flight of Scottish football and their 43rd season overall. Aberdeen competed in the Scottish League Division One, Scottish League Cup, and the Scottish Cup.

== Results ==
=== Division A ===
Match Day	Date	Opponent	H/A	Score	Aberdeen Scorer(s)	Attendance
1	5 September	St Mirren	H	0–3		15,000
2	12 September	Stirling Albion	A	0–1		10,000
3	19 September	Dundee	H	1–1	Yorston	18,000
4	26 September	Celtic	A	0–3		35,000
5	3 October	Partick Thistle	A	2–1	Allister, Leggat	16,000
6	10 October	Hamilton Academical	H	5–1	Buckley (3), Hay, Hather	12,500
7	17 October	Airdrieonians	H	5–0	Buckley (2), Leggat, Yorston. Young	14,500
8	31 October	Clyde	A	4–2	Hather (2), Buckley, Leggat	10,000
9	7 November	Rangers	H	1–1	Allister (penalty)	25,000
10	14 November	Queen of the South	H	2–0	Hather, Yorston	27,000
11	21 November	Falkirk	A	2–2	Yorston, Leggat	10,000
12	28 November	Heart of Midlothian	A	2–3	Yorston, Hay	28,000
13	5 December	Raith Rovers	H	2–0	Leggat, Buckley	14,000
14	12 December	Hamilton Academical	A	2–3	Leggat, Yorston	7,500
15	19 December	St Mirren	A	4–1	Buckley (2), Hather, Hay	7,000
16	26 December	Stirling Albion	H	8–0	Buckley (3), Leggat (2) Hather (2), Hay	15,000
17	1 January	Dundee	A	2–4	Allister (penalty), Hay	25,000
18	2 January	Celtic	H	2–0	Buckley (2)	28,000
19	9 January	Partick Thistle	A	3–6	Leggat (2), Hay	18,000
20	16 January	Hibernian	H	1–3	Yorston	17,500
21	23 January	Airdireonians	A	3–1	Buckley, O'Neil, Wishart	8,500
22	6 February	East Fife	H	1–0	Allister	16,000
23	20 February	Clyde	H	5–3	Leggat (3), O'Neil (2)	15,000
24	6 March	Queen of the South	A	4–2	O'Neil (2), Boyd, Buckley	7,000
25	17 March	Falkirk	H	0–1		10,000
26	20 March	Heart of Midlothian	H	1–0	Leggat	17,000
27	27 March	Raith Rovers	A	1–3	Wishart	7,000
28	14 April	East Fife	A	0–2		6,500
29	17 April	Rangers	A	3–1	Leggat, Buckley, Allister (penalty)	34,000
30	19 April	Hibernian	A	0–3		28,000

==== Final standings ====
Pos	Team	Pld	W	D	L	GF	GA	GD	Pts
7	Dundee	30	14	6	10	46	47	−1	34
8	Clyde	30	15	4	11	64	67	−3	34
9	Aberdeen	30	15	3	12	66	51	+15	33
10	Queen of the South	30	14	4	12	72	58	+14	32
11	St Mirren	30	12	4	14	44	54	−10	28

Source: RSSSF

=== Scottish League Cup ===
==== Group 2 ====
Round	Date	Opponent	H/A	Score	Aberdeen Scorer(s)	Attendance
1	8 August	Celtic	A	1–0	Brown	50,000
2	12 August	Airdrieonians	H	2–0	Hather, Cross (own goal)	28,000
3	15 August	East Fife	A	0–2		8,000
4	22 August	Celtic	H	5–2	Yorston (2), Buckley (2), Hather	30,000
5	26 August	Airdrieonians	A	3–4	Yorston (2), Hather	9,000
6	29 August	East Fife	H	3–4	Hamilton, Buckley, Hather	30,000

==== Group 2 final table ====
Team	Pld	W	D	L	GF	GA	GR	Pts
East Fife	6	4	1	1	14	9	1.556	9
Aberdeen	6	3	0	3	14	12	1.167	6
Airdrieonians	6	3	0	3	11	14	0.786	6
Celtic	6	1	1	4	6	10	0.600	3

=== Scottish Cup ===
Round	Date	Opponent	H/A	Score	Aberdeen Scorer(s)	Attendance
R2	13 February	Duns	A	8–0	Buckley (4), Hamilton (2), Leggat (2)	700
R3	27 February	Hibernian	A	3–1	Hather (2), Buckley	47,682
QF	6 March	Queen of the South	A	4–2	O'Neil (2), Boyd, Buckley	7,000
SF	10 April	Rangers	N	6–0	O'Neil (4), Leggat, Allister	110,939
F	24 April	Celtic	N	1–2	Buckley	130,060

== Squad ==
=== Appearances & Goals ===
No.	Pos	Nat	Player	Total		Division One		Scottish Cup		League Cup	
No.	Pos	Nat	Player	Apps	Goals	Apps	Goals	Apps	Goals	Apps	Goals
	GK	(Scotland) SCO	Fred Martin	33	0	25	0	5	0	3	0
	GK	(Scotland) SCO	Reg Morrison	8	0	5	0	0	0	3	0
	GK	(Scotland) SCO	Danny Mowatt	0	0	0	0	0	0	0	0
	DF	(Scotland) SCO	Jack Allister	37	7	26	5	5	1	6	1
	DF	(Scotland) SCO	Jimmy Mitchell (c)	37	0	26	0	5	0	6	0
	DF	(Scotland) SCO	Alec Young	36	1	27	1	5	0	4	0
	DF	(Scotland) SCO	Dave Caldwell	35	0	27	0	5	0	3	0
	DF	(Scotland) SCO	Billy Smith	15	0	9	0	0	0	6	0
	DF	(Scotland) SCO	Bobby Paterson	2	0	2	0	0	0	0	0
	DF	(Scotland) SCO	Jim Clunie	2	0	1	0	1	0	0	0
	DF	(Scotland) SCO	Dave Aitken	2	0	2	0	0	0	0	0
	DF	(Scotland) SCO	Jimmy Walker	0	0	0	0	0	0	0	0
	MF	(Scotland) SCO	Archie Glen	32	0	27	0	5	0	0	0
	MF	(Scotland) SCO	Graham Leggat	31	19	26	15	5	4	0	0
	MF	(Scotland) SCO	Tony Harris	11	0	5	0	0	0	6	0
	MF	(Scotland) SCO	Bob Wishart	9	2	8	2	1	0	0	0
	MF	(Scotland) SCO	Allan Boyd	3	1	3	1	0	0	0	0
	MF	(Canada) CAN	Fred Cameron	0	0	0	0	0	0	0	0
	MF	(Scotland) SCO	Doug Newlands	0	0	0	0	0	0	0	0
	MF	(Scotland) SCO	Laurie Higgins	0	0	0	0	0	0	0	0
	MF	(Scotland) SCO	Jimmy Wallace	0	0	0	0	0	0	0	0
	MF	??	Alex McAllister	0	0	0	0	0	0	0	0
	FW	(Scotland) SCO	Paddy Buckley	38	27	29	17	5	7	4	3
	FW	(England) ENG	Jack Hather	35	12	25	7	4	2	6	3
	FW	(Scotland) SCO	George Hamilton	26	4	15	0	5	3	6	1
	FW	(Scotland) SCO	Harry Yorston	22	11	16	7	0	0	6	4
	FW	(Scotland) SCO	Joe O'Neil	14	9	10	5	4	4	0	0
	FW	(Scotland) SCO	Hugh Hay	11	6	11	6	0	0	0	0
	FW	??	Jack Dunbar	6	0	2	0	0	0	4	0
	FW	(Scotland) SCO	Jimmy Brown	3	1	0	0	0	0	3	1
	FW	(Scotland) SCO	George Kelly	1	0	1	0	0	0	0	0
	FW	(Scotland) SCO	John Brown	1	0	1	0	0	0	0	0
	FW	(Scotland) SCO	Ivor Smith	1	0	1	0	0	0	0	0
	FW	??	Ally MacRae	0	0	0	0	0	0	0	0
