= Tommy Pearson =

Scottish footballer and manager

Personal information
- Full name: Thomas Usher Pearson
- Date of birth: 6 March 1913
- Place of birth: Edinburgh, Scotland
- Date of death: 2 March 1999 (aged 85)
- Place of death: Edinburgh, Scotland
- Height: 5 ft 8 in (1.73 m)
- Position: Outside left

Youth career
- Murrayfield Amateurs

Senior career*
Years	Team	Apps	(Gls)
1933–1947	Newcastle United	212	(46)
1947–1953	Aberdeen	84	(10)
Total		296	(56)

International career
1939	England (wartime)	1	(0)
1945	Scotland (wartime)	1	(0)
1947	Scotland	2	(0)
1948	Scottish Football League XI	2	(0)

Managerial career
- 1959–1965: Aberdeen
- * Club domestic league appearances and goals

Thomas Usher Pearson (6 March 1913 – 2 March 1999) was a Scottish professional football player and manager.

== Playing career ==
Born in Edinburgh, Pearson played for Murrayfield Amateurs, and had a trial for Heart of Midlothian, but signed professional terms with Newcastle United in March 1933. He played over 200 games for Newcastle before and after the Second World War, scoring a total of 52 goals. Pearson was renowned as a skilful and entertaining outside-left, although he won no major honours at St James' Park.

Pearson made a guest appearance for England during a wartime international against Scotland in Newcastle when outside left Eric Brook was injured before the game. Pearson was at the match as a spectator, but agreed to turn out for England. He was capped twice by Scotland in 1947, which uniquely meant that he had played for both Scotland and England.

In 1948, he was signed by Aberdeen for £4,000, and quickly became a crowd favourite, renowned particularly for his 'double shuffle', which baffled opposing players and spectators alike. Pearson retired at the age of 40, and took up a career as a sports writer, often covering Aberdeen for the Scottish Daily Mail.

== Managerial career ==
In November 1959, Pearson was appointed manager of Aberdeen, in spite of his lack of coaching or managerial experience, and the six years he had spent outside the game, albeit as an observer. Unusually, his predecessor, Davie Shaw stayed on at the club in his former capacity as coach. Pearson's time in office coincided with the departure or retirement of a number of key players, and long-term injuries to others, alleviated only briefly by the emergence of Charlie Cooke, soon on his way to Chelsea. There were a sequence of Scottish Cup exits to lower league teams, and in spite of a Summer Cup final, ultimately lost to Hibs in 1964, Pearson's reign ended with his resignation on 13 February 1965.

== Career statistics ==
=== Club ===
Appearances and goals by club, season and competition
Club	Season	League			National Cup		League Cup		Europe		Total	
Club	Season	Division	Apps	Goals	Apps	Goals	Apps	Goals	Apps	Goals	Apps	Goals
Newcastle United	1933–34	First Division	4	1	0	0	-	-	-	-	4	1
Newcastle United	1934–35	Second Division	25	13	2	1	-	-	-	-	27	14
Newcastle United	1935–36	Second Division	40	12	5	2	-	-	-	-	45	14
Newcastle United	1936–37	Second Division	37	7	1	0	-	-	-	-	38	7
Newcastle United	1937–38	Second Division	41	4	1	0	-	-	-	-	42	4
Newcastle United	1938–39	Second Division	6	2	0	0	-	-	-	-	6	2
Newcastle United	1939–40	Competitive football cancelled due to the Second World War										
Newcastle United	1940–41	Competitive football cancelled due to the Second World War										
Newcastle United	1941–42	Competitive football cancelled due to the Second World War										
Newcastle United	1942–43	Competitive football cancelled due to the Second World War										
Newcastle United	1943–44	Competitive football cancelled due to the Second World War										
Newcastle United	1944–45	Competitive football cancelled due to the Second World War										
Newcastle United	1945–46	Competitive football cancelled due to the Second World War										
Newcastle United	1946–47	Second Division	38	4	6	2	-	-	-	-	44	6
Newcastle United	1947–48	Second Division	21	3	1	1	-	-	-	-	22	4
Newcastle United	Total		212	46	16	6	-	-	-	-	228	52
Aberdeen	1947–48	Scottish Division One	9	1	1	1	0	0	0	0	10	2
Aberdeen	1948–49	Scottish Division One	15	2	1	0	6	1	0	0	22	3
Aberdeen	1949–50	Scottish Division One	20	3	5	2	6	1	0	0	31	6
Aberdeen	1950–51	Scottish Division One	19	3	3	0	1	0	0	0	23	3
Aberdeen	1951–52	Scottish Division One	20	1	4	0	4	1	0	0	28	2
Aberdeen	1952–53	Scottish Division One	2	0	0	0	0	0	0	0	2	0
Aberdeen	Total		85	10	14	3	17	3	0	0	116	16
Career total			297	56	30	9	17	3	0	0	344	68

=== International ===
Appearances and goals by national team and year
National team	Year	Apps	Goals
Scotland	1947	2	0
Total		2	0

=== Managerial record ===
Team	From	To	Record				
Team	From	To	P	W	L	D	Win %
Aberdeen	1959	1965	229	84	89	56	36.68
