= John Allan Boyd =

Scottish footballer (1929–2019)

John Boyd
Personal information
- Full name: John Allan Boyd
- Date of birth: 21 November 1929
- Place of birth: Dumbarton, Scotland
- Date of death: 25 October 2019 (aged 89)
- Place of death: Ayr, Scotland
- Position: Winger

Senior career*
Years	Team	Apps	(Gls)
1946–1950	Queen's Park	54	(7)
1950–1958	Aberdeen	69	(21)
1958–1959	East Fife	23	(3)
Total		146	(31)

International career
1948	Great Britain	1	(0)
- * Club domestic league appearances and goals

John Allan Boyd (21 November 1929 – 25 October 2019) was a Scottish footballer who represented Great Britain at the 1948 Summer Olympics. Boyd played as a winger in the Scottish Football League for Queen's Park, Aberdeen and East Fife between 1946 and 1959.

== Career statistics ==
Appearances and goals by club, season and competition
Club	Seasons	League			Scottish Cup		League Cup		Europe		Total	
Club	Seasons	Division	Apps	Goals	Apps	Goals	Apps	Goals	Apps	Goals	Apps	Goals
Queen's Park	1946-47	Scottish Division One	10	1	0	0	0	0	0	0	10	1
Queen's Park	1947-48	Scottish Division One	0	0	0	0	1	0	0	0	1	0
Queen's Park	1948-49	Scottish Division Two	26	4	1	0	3	2	0	0	30	6
Queen's Park	1949-50	Scottish Division Two	18	2	1	0	6	0	0	0	25	2
Queen's Park	Total		54	7	2	0	10	2	0	0	66	9
Aberdeen	1950–51	Scottish Division One	10	3	0	0	10	2	0	0	20	5
Aberdeen	1951–52	Scottish Division One	16	5	4	1	0	0	0	0	20	6
Aberdeen	1952–53	Scottish Division One	12	5	0	0	3	0	0	0	15	5
Aberdeen	1953–54	Scottish Division One	3	1	0	0	0	0	0	0	3	1
Aberdeen	1954–55	Scottish Division One	0	0	0	0	0	0	0	0	0	0
Aberdeen	1955–56	Scottish Division One	13	4	0	0	0	0	0	0	13	4
Aberdeen	1956–57	Scottish Division One	8	2	0	0	1	0	0	0	9	2
Aberdeen	1957–58	Scottish Division One	7	1	0	0	2	2	0	0	9	3
Aberdeen	Total		69	21	4	1	16	4	0	0	89	26
East Fife	1958-59	Scottish Second Division	23	3	-	-	-	-	-	-	23+	3+
Career total			146	31	6+	1+	26+	6+	0	0	178+	38+
