= Jim Clunie =

Scottish footballer & manager (1933–2003)

Personal information
- Full name: James Robertson Clunie
- Date of birth: 4 September 1933
- Place of birth: Kirkcaldy, Scotland
- Date of death: 12 May 2003 (aged 69)
- Place of death: Kilmarnock, Scotland
- Position: Centre-half

Senior career*
Years	Team	Apps	(Gls)
1951–1953	Raith Rovers	9	(0)
1953–1960	Aberdeen	104	(9)
1960–1965	St Mirren	165	(12)
1965	Bury	10	(0)
1965–1966	St Mirren	14	(1)
1966–1967	Forfar Athletic	1	(0)
Total		303	(22)

International career
1964	Scottish League XI	1	(0)

Managerial career
- 1978–1981: St Mirren
- 1981–1985: Kilmarnock
- * Club domestic league appearances and goals

Jim Clunie (4 September 1933 – 12 May 2003) was a Scottish football player and manager.

Clunie played in three cup finals for Aberdeen. These were the 1954 and 1959 Scottish Cup Finals, which they lost 2–1 to Celtic and 3–1 to St Mirren, and the 1955 Scottish League Cup Final which Aberdeen won 2–1 against St Mirren. He transferred to St Mirren in 1960, for whom he played in the 1962 Scottish Cup Final.

Clunie was the first player to be substituted in a Scottish match, when he was replaced by Archie Gemmill after 23 minutes of the Scottish League Cup tie against Clyde on 13 August 1966.

In 1976, Clunie was a coach at Southampton when the club won the FA Cup by beating Manchester United 1–0 in the 1976 FA Cup Final.

Clunie went on to manage St Mirren from 1978 to 1981, replacing Alex Ferguson. He took St Mirren into Europe for the first time ever after they finished third in the league in 1981. Clunie also managed Kilmarnock from 1981 to 1985.

== Career statistics ==
=== Club ===
Appearances and goals by club, season and competition
Club	Season	League			National Cup		League Cup		Europe		Total	
Club	Season	Division	Apps	Goals	Apps	Goals	Apps	Goals	Apps	Goals	Apps	Goals
Raith Rovers	1951–52	Scottish Division One										
Raith Rovers	1952–53	Scottish Division One										
Raith Rovers	Total		9	0							9+	0+
Aberdeen	1953–54	Scottish Division One	1	0	1	0	0	0	0	0	2	0
Aberdeen	1954–55	Scottish Division One	0	0	0	0	2	0	0	0	2	0
Aberdeen	1955–56	Scottish Division One	14	1	0	0	7	0	0	0	21	1
Aberdeen	1956–57	Scottish Division One	10	0	2	0	0	0	0	0	12	0
Aberdeen	1957–58	Scottish Division One	25	0	3	0	2	0	0	0	30	0
Aberdeen	1958–59	Scottish Division One	28	1	7	0	5	0	0	0	40	1
Aberdeen	1959–60	Scottish Division One	26	7	3	0	5	0	0	0	34	7
Aberdeen	Total		104	9	16	0	21	0	0	0	141	9
St Mirren	1960–61	Scottish Division One										
St Mirren	1961–62	Scottish Division One										
St Mirren	1962–63	Scottish Division One										
St Mirren	1963–64	Scottish Division One										
St Mirren	1964–65	Scottish Division One										
St Mirren	Total		165	12							226	16
Bury	1965–66	Second Division	10	0							10+	0+
Bury	Total		10	0							10+	0+
St Mirren	1965–66	Scottish Division One										
St Mirren	1966–67	Scottish Division One										
St Mirren	Total		14	1							15	1
Forfar Athletic	1966–67	Scottish Second Division	1	0	0	0	0	0	0	0	1	0
Forfar Athletic	Total		1	0	0	0	0	0	0	0	1	0
Career total			303	22	16+	0+	21+	0+	0	0	402+	26+

=== Managerial ===
Team	From	To	Record				
Team	From	To	P	W	L	D	Win %
St Mirren	1978	1980	127	54	40	33	42.52%
Kilmarnock	1981	1984	179	58	69	52	32.40%
Total			306	112	109	85	37.46%
