= Chris Anderson (footballer, born 1925) =

Scottish footballer, educator, and football administrator (1925–1986)

Chris Anderson OBE
Personal information
- Full name: Christopher Anderson
- Date of birth: 30 August 1925
- Place of birth: Aberdeen, Scotland
- Date of death: 27 May 1986 (aged 60)
- Place of death: Peterculter, Scotland
- Position: Wing half

Youth career
- Mugiemoss

Senior career*
Years	Team	Apps	(Gls)
1943–1945	Aberdeen	0	(0)
1946–1947	Hartlepools United	2	(0)
1948–1953	Aberdeen	71	(1)
1953–1957	Arbroath	56	(2)
Total		129	(3)
- * Club domestic league appearances and goals

Christopher Anderson OBE (30 August 1925 – 27 May 1986) was a Scottish footballer, educator and football administrator. He is best remembered for his time as vice-chairman of Aberdeen F.C., where he was regarded as one of the game's most forward-thinking and innovative characters. Anderson was appointed an Officer of the Order of the British Empire (OBE) in the 1981 Birthday Honours, and was inducted into the Aberdeen FC "Hall of Fame" as one of the founding members in 2003.

== Playing and coaching career ==
Anderson was born and grew up in Aberdeen, and showed promise as a player from an early age. He was capped by Scotland Schoolboys and joined the Junior team Mugiemoss as a teenager. Bill Struth, manager of Rangers, expressed an interest in the young Anderson, but instead he signed for his local team in 1943.

Wartime delayed his senior debut until 1948, and his time as a player at Pittodrie coincided with a lean period in the club's fortunes. One of the few highlights of his time there as a player was a Scottish Cup tie in 1950 against Celtic at Parkhead, in which Anderson scored the only goal. This was the first time that Aberdeen had beaten Celtic in a cup tie in Glasgow.

During his time as an Aberdeen player, Anderson spent a short period at Hartlepools United, playing only two games for the English club. According to the Aberdeen official website, he was only denied senior international honours by a knee injury sustained playing against Celtic. In 1953, Anderson was transferred to Arbroath, where he ended his playing career.

Anderson was forced to give up the game in 1956 following a series of injuries, but stayed with Arbroath as assistant to the manager, Tommy Gray. The following season, he was appointed chief coach (rather than manager) in place of Gray, and steered Arbroath to promotion in 1958–59. The following campaign in the first division ended in relegation, however, and Anderson was replaced as manager by John Prentice before the end of the season.

== Educator and administrator ==
Anderson joined the board of directors at Aberdeen in 1967, and was made vice-chairman three years later. He also had a distinguished career in education, and before his retirement he was secretary of Robert Gordon University, a prominent technology college, later granted university status. His OBE was awarded for services to both education and sport, but it is as a football administrator and visionary that he is best known.

Anderson's time on the board at Aberdeen coincided with the most successful period in the club's history, and he is considered to have been a driving force behind that success. As well as being instrumental in the development of Pittodrie as one of the first all-seater stadia in Britain, he was a prime mover in the creation of the Scottish Premier Division in 1975, a response to the declining attendances of the time.

As a member of the Aberdeen board, he was responsible for the appointment of Alex Ferguson as manager in 1978. Ferguson noted that

He was a gentleman, and his unfailingly progressive thinking brought huge benefits to the club

== Death ==
Anderson took early retirement from his post at Robert Gordon University in 1984, intending to focus more of his energies on running the football club as chairman. However, following an operation to correct a hernia in 1984, he noticed a stiffness in his right side, which was diagnosed as motor neurone disease. He continued to serve on the Aberdeen board in spite of his increasing disability, and was still well enough to attend the 1985 Scottish League Cup Final victory over Hibs. He realised that this would be his last visit to Hampden Park:

When I went to Hampden for the League Cup final in October and Willie Miller stepped up to receive the trophy, I found myself looking round the great stadium and knowing it was the last time I would see it.

By the time of the 1986 Scottish Cup Final, later that season, Anderson was unable to move independently, and was only able to communicate with technological assistance. He died 17 days later, at the age of 60.

The Chris Anderson Stadium in Aberdeen is named after him.

== Career statistics ==
Appearances and goals by club, season and competition
Club	Season	League			National Cup		League Cup		Europe		Total	
Club	Season	Division	Apps	Goals	Apps	Goals	Apps	Goals	Apps	Goals	Apps	Goals
Aberdeen	1943–44	Competitive Football Cancelled Due to WW2										
Aberdeen	1944–45	Competitive Football Cancelled Due to WW2										
Hartlepools United	1946–47	Third Division North	2	0	0	0	–	–	–	–	2	0
Aberdeen	1948–49	Scottish Division One	7	0	1	0	0	0	0	0	8	0
Aberdeen	1949–50	Scottish Division One	29	0	5	1	6	0	0	0	40	1
Aberdeen	1950–51	Scottish Division One	20	1	3	0	10	1	0	0	33	2
Aberdeen	1951–52	Scottish Division One	11	0	4	0	0	0	0	0	15	0
Aberdeen	1952–53	Scottish Division One	4	0	0	0	3	0	0	0	7	0
Aberdeen	Total		71	1	13	1	19	1	0	0	103	3
Arbroath	1953–54	Scottish Division B	19	1	2	0	6	1	–	–	27	2
Arbroath	1954–55	Scottish Division B	26	1	2	0	2	1	–	–	30	2
Arbroath	1955–56	Scottish Second Division	10	0	1	0	5	0	–	–	16	0
Arbroath	1956–57	Scottish Second Division	1	0	1	0	6	0	–	–	8	0
Arbroath	Total		56	2	6	0	19	2	-	-	81	4
Career total			129	3	19	1	38	3	0	0	186	7

== Honours ==
=== Player ===
Aberdeen

- Caledonia Trophy: 1948–49, 1949–50

=== Manager ===
Arbroath

- Scottish Second Division promotion: 1958–59
- Forfarshire Cup: 1957–58

=== Vice-chairman ===
Aberdeen

- UEFA Cup Winners Cup: 1982–83

He was posthumously awarded a winners medal in 2023 along with Alex Ferguson, Archie Knox, Dougie Bell, Teddy Scott, and Dick Donald.
