= Fred Martin (footballer, born 1929) =

Scottish footballer

Personal information
- Full name: Fred George Martin
- Date of birth: 13 May 1929
- Place of birth: Carnoustie, Angus, Scotland
- Date of death: 20 August 2013 (aged 84)
- Place of death: Methven, Perth and Kinross, Scotland
- Position: Goalkeeper

Youth career
- Carnoustie Panmure

Senior career*
Years	Team	Apps	(Gls)
- Carnoustie Panmure
1946–1960	Aberdeen	208	(0)

International career
1952–1954	Scottish League XI	3	(0)
1954–1955	Scotland	6	(0)
1955	Scotland A vs B trial	1	(0)
- * Club domestic league appearances and goals

Fred George Martin (13 May 1929 – 20 August 2013) was a Scottish professional footballer, who played as a goalkeeper. His only senior club was Aberdeen, with whom he played for 14 years. He also represented Scotland during their first FIFA World Cup finals appearance in 1954.

== Club career ==
Originally signed from Carnoustie Panmure as an inside forward, Martin was converted into a goalkeeper during his period of National Service. He made his Aberdeen debut in his new position in a 3–1 defeat by East Fife in 1949–50, scoring an own goal when he fumbled a last minute cross into his net. He recovered from this start and became a regular over the next seven seasons, helping the Dons to their first League title in 1954–55 and the 1955–56 League Cup. Martin also featured in three Scottish Cup finals for the Reds (1952–53, 1953–54 and 1958–59), although he was on the losing side on each occasion. The latter years of his time at Pittodrie saw Martin fall victim to a succession of injuries and after making only four appearances during the season, he retired at the end of the 1959–60 campaign.

== Scotland career ==
Martin was chosen to represent the Scottish Football League in 1952 and two years later earned his first full Scotland cap in a 1–0 win against Norway, making his debut alongside Dons teammates Paddy Buckley and George Hamilton. He was selected in the Scotland squad for the 1954 World Cup and played in both Scotland's matches, a 1–0 defeat by Austria and a 7–0 defeat by Uruguay. Martin was considered partially responsible for scale of the Uruguayan defeat and dropped, with his inconsistency being highlighted in the media. In the opinion of Scottish football journalist and historian Bob Crampsey "when the mood was upon him, he could be very good, but at other times, played exactly as you would expect an inside-right to play if shoved between the posts."

Martin was recalled for games against Hungary and England in late 1954 and early 1955 but on each occasion Scotland lost heavily (4–2 and 7–2 respectively) and his international career was effectively over. He conceded a total of 20 goals in his six games for Scotland.

== Post-football ==
After retiring from football, Martin went into the whisky trade and worked for Dewar's Whisky until he retired in 1994. In 2007, he was one of the inaugural inductees into the Aberdeen Football Club Hall of Fame in recognition of his achievements and legendary status at the club. He died in August 2013 at the age of 84.

== Career statistics ==
=== Club ===
Appearances and goals by club, season and competition
Club	Season	League			Scottish Cup		League Cup		Europe		Total	
Club	Season	Division	Apps	Goals	Apps	Goals	Apps	Goals	Apps	Goals	Apps	Goals
Aberdeen	1948–49	Scottish Division One	0	0	0	0	0	0	0	0	0	0
Aberdeen	1949–50	Scottish Division One	2	0	0	0	0	0	0	0	2	0
Aberdeen	1950–51	Scottish Division One	24	0	2	0	10	0	0	0	36	0
Aberdeen	1951–52	Scottish Division One	23	0	4	0	6	0	0	0	33	0
Aberdeen	1952–53	Scottish Division One	28	0	9	0	5	0	0	0	42	0
Aberdeen	1953–54	Scottish Division One	25	0	5	0	3	0	0	0	33	0
Aberdeen	1954–55	Scottish Division One	28	0	6	0	6	0	0	0	40	0
Aberdeen	1955–56	Scottish Division One	32	0	1	0	10	0	0	0	43	0
Aberdeen	1956–57	Scottish Division One	26	0	0	0	2	0	0	0	28	0
Aberdeen	1957–58	Scottish Division One	10	0	0	0	8	0	0	0	18	0
Aberdeen	1958–59	Scottish Division One	8	0	6	0	0	0	0	0	14	0
Aberdeen	1959–60	Scottish Division One	2	0	0	0	2	0	0	0	4	0
Aberdeen	Total		208	0	33	0	52	0	0	0	293	0

=== International ===
Appearances and goals by national team and year
National team	Year	Apps	Goals
Scotland	1954	5	0
Scotland	1955	1	0
Total		6	0

== See also ==
- List of one-club men
