= Bobby Wishart =

Scottish footballer (1933–2020)

Personal information
- Date of birth: 10 March 1933
- Place of birth: Edinburgh, Scotland
- Date of death: 3 December 2020 (aged 87)
- Position: Inside forward

Youth career
- Merchiston Thistle

Senior career*
Years	Team	Apps	(Gls)
1953–1961	Aberdeen	177	(45)
1961–1964	Dundee	76	(11)
1964–1965	Airdrieonians	6	(0)
1965	Raith Rovers	9	(3)
Total		268	(59)

International career
1955–1956	Scotland U23	2	(0)
1955	Scottish League XI	2	(1)
- * Club domestic league appearances and goals

Bobby Wishart (10 March 1933 – 3 December 2020) was a Scottish footballer, who played for Aberdeen, Dundee, Airdrie and Raith Rovers. Wishart won the Scottish league championship in 1955 with Aberdeen and 1962 with Dundee.

Wishart died on 3 December 2020, at the age of 87.

== Career statistics ==
Appearances and goals by club, season and competition
Club	Season	League			Scottish Cup		League Cup		Europe		Total	
Club	Season	Division	Apps	Goals	Apps	Goals	Apps	Goals	Apps	Goals	Apps	Goals
Aberdeen	1953–54	Scottish Division One	8	2	1	0	0	0	0	0	9	2
Aberdeen	1954–55	Scottish Division One	23	7	6	1	0	0	0	0	29	8
Aberdeen	1955–56	Scottish Division One	31	8	1	0	10	2	0	0	42	10
Aberdeen	1956–57	Scottish Division One	29	9	2	2	3	1	0	0	34	12
Aberdeen	1957–58	Scottish Division One	27	7	3	3	8	1	0	0	38	11
Aberdeen	1958–59	Scottish Division One	32	8	7	1	6	4	0	0	45	13
Aberdeen	1959–60	Scottish Division One	24	4	2	0	6	2	0	0	32	6
Aberdeen	1960–61	Scottish Division One	3	0	0	0	3	0	0	0	6	0
Aberdeen	Total		177	45	22	7	36	10	0	0	235	62
Dundee	1960–61	Scottish Division One	15	4	1	0	0	0	0	0	16	4
Dundee	1961–62	Scottish Division One	29	6	1	0	6	1	0	0	36	7
Dundee	1962–63	Scottish Division One	29	1	5	1	5	0	8	1	47	3
Dundee	1963–64	Scottish Division One	3	0	0	0	1	0	0	0	4	0
Dundee	Total		76	11	7	1	12	1	8	1	103	14
Airdrieonians	1964–65	Scottish Division One	6	0					—		6+	0+
Raith Rovers	1964–65	Scottish Second Division	9	3					—		9+	3+
Career total			268	59	29+	8+	48+	11+	8	1	353+	79+
