= Jack Hather =

English footballer

Personal information
- Full name: John Hather
- Date of birth: 29 September 1926
- Place of birth: Annfield Plain, England
- Date of death: 1st January 1996 (Aged 69)
- Place of death: Durham, England
- Height: 5 ft 6 in (1.68 m)
- Position: Outside left

Youth career
- Annfield Plain

Senior career*
Years	Team	Apps	(Gls)
1948–1960	Aberdeen	264	(79)
Total		264	(79)
- * Club domestic league appearances and goals

John "Jack" Hather was an English professional football outside-left who played for Scottish club Aberdeen.

Born in Annfield Plain, County Durham, Hather joined Aberdeen in December 1948. He was part of the Aberdeen team who won the 1955 Scottish League championship and the 1955 Scottish League Cup.

After leaving Aberdeen in 1960, he moved back to the North East of England to play for amateur club Blackhall F.C.

== Career statistics ==
=== Club ===
Appearances and goals by club, season and competition
Club	Season	League			Scottish Cup		League Cup		Total	
Club	Season	Division	Apps	Goals	Apps	Goals	Apps	Goals	Apps	Goals
Aberdeen	1948–49	Scottish Division One	14	4	1	0	0	0	15	4
Aberdeen	1949–50	Scottish Division One	17	6	0	0	0	0	17	6
Aberdeen	1950–51	Scottish Division One	10	3	0	0	9	2	19	5
Aberdeen	1951–52	Scottish Division One	10	0	0	0	2	0	12	0
Aberdeen	1952–53	Scottish Division One	28	14	9	3	6	1	43	18
Aberdeen	1953–54	Scottish Division One	25	7	4	2	6	3	35	12
Aberdeen	1954–55	Scottish Division One	30	9	6	3	6	3	42	15
Aberdeen	1955–56	Scottish Division One	24	11	1	0	5	2	30	13
Aberdeen	1956–57	Scottish Division One	32	7	2	0	6	2	40	9
Aberdeen	1957–58	Scottish Division One	30	9	3	0	7	1	40	10
Aberdeen	1958–59	Scottish Division One	29	7	7	2	6	2	42	11
Aberdeen	1959–60	Scottish Division One	15	2	1	0	0	0	16	2
Career total			264	79	34	10	53	16	351	105

== Honours ==
Aberdeen

- Scottish First Division (1): 1954–55
- Scottish League Cup (1): 1955–56
