= George McMillan (footballer) =

Scottish footballer (1930–2019)

Personal information
- Full name: George Sneddon McMillan
- Date of birth: 15 March 1930
- Place of birth: Motherwell, Scotland
- Date of death: 25 December 2019 (aged 89)
- Place of death: Peterborough, England
- Position: Left wing

Senior career*
Years	Team	Apps	(Gls)
1950–1952	Aberdeen	1	(0)
1952–1953	Wrexham	1	(0)
- Brechin City
- Montrose
- * Club domestic league appearances and goals

George Sneddon McMillan (15 March 1930 – 25 December 2019) was a Scottish professional footballer. He made one appearance in the Scottish top flight with Aberdeen and in the English football league with Wrexham.
