= 1952–53 Scottish Cup =

Tournament details
- Country: Scotland

Final positions
- Champions: Rangers
- Runners-up: Aberdeen

The 1952–53 Scottish Cup was the 68th staging of Scotland's most prestigious football knockout competition. The Cup was won by Rangers who defeated Aberdeen in the replayed final.

== First round ==
Home team	Score	Away team
Berwick Rangers	3 – 3	Dundee United
Dumbarton	1 – 3	Cowdenbeath
East Fife	7 – 1	Vale of Leithen
Elgin City	2 – 3	Third Lanark
Eyemouth United	0 – 4	Celtic
Hibernian	8 – 1	Stenhousemuir
Leith Athletic	1 – 8	Airdrieonians
Greenock Morton	3 – 1	Dunfermline Athletic
Newton Stewart	2 – 2	Falkirk
Queen of the South	2 – 1	Huntly
Raith Rovers	5 – 0	Clachnacuddin
Rangers	4 – 0	Arbroath
St Mirren	1 – 1	Brechin City
Stranraer	0 – 4	Kilmarnock

=== Replays ===
Home team	Score	Away team
Brechin City	0 – 1	St Mirren
Dundee United	2 – 3	Berwick Rangers
Falkirk	4 – 0	Newton Stewart

== Second round ==
Home team	Score	Away team
Aberdeen	2 – 0	St Mirren
Airdrieonians	3 – 0	East Fife
Albion Rovers	2 – 0	East Stirlingshire
Alloa Athletic	0 – 2	Motherwell
Berwick Rangers	2 – 3	Queen of the South
Buckie Thistle	1 – 5	Ayr United
Cowdenbeath	0 – 1	Greenock Morton
Dundee	0 – 2	Rangers
Forfar Athletic	2 – 4	Falkirk
Hamilton Academical	2 – 2	Kilmarnock
Hibernian	4 – 2	Queen's Park
Partick Thistle	0 – 2	Clyde
Raith Rovers	0 – 1	Hearts
St Johnstone	1 – 2	Montrose
Stirling Albion	1 – 1	Celtic
Wigtown & Blanoch	1 – 3	Third Lanark

=== Replays ===
Home team	Score	Away team
Celtic	3 – 0	Stirling Albion
Kilmarnock	0 – 2	Hamilton Academical

== Third round ==
Home team	Score	Away team
Aberdeen	5 – 5	Motherwell
Airdrieonians	0 – 4	Hibernian
Clyde	8 – 3	Ayr United
Falkirk	2 – 3	Celtic
Hearts	3 – 1	Montrose
Greenock Morton	1 – 4	Rangers
Queen of the South	2 – 0	Albion Rovers
Third Lanark	1 – 0	Hamilton Academical

=== Replays ===
Home team	Score	Away team
Motherwell	1 – 6	Aberdeen

== Quarter-finals ==
Home team	Score	Away team
Clyde	1 – 2	Third Lanark
Hearts	2 – 1	Queen of the South
Hibernian	1 – 1	Aberdeen
Rangers	2 – 0	Celtic

=== Replays ===
Home team	Score	Away team
Aberdeen	2 – 0	Hibernian

== Semi-finals ==
4 April 1953

Aberdeen	1–1	Third Lanark
Paddy Buckley 59'		John Cuthbertson 77'

Ibrox Stadium, Glasgow
Attendance: 18,468
Referee: Charlie Faultless

4 April 1953

Rangers	2–1	Hearts
Derek Grierson 44'; John Prentice 75'		Jimmy Wardhaugh 11'

Hampden Park, Glasgow
Attendance: 116,262

=== Replays ===
8 April 1953

Aberdeen	2–1	Third Lanark
Yorston 32' 71'		Wattie Dick 30'

Ibrox Stadium, Glasgow
Attendance: 21,000
Referee: Charlie Faultless

== Final ==
25 April 1953

Rangers	1–1	Aberdeen
Prentice 8'		Yorston 80'

Hampden Park, Glasgow
Attendance: 129,761
Referee: Jack Mowat

=== Replay ===
29 April 1953

Rangers	1–0	Aberdeen
Billy Simpson 42'

Hampden Park, Glasgow
Attendance: 113,700
Referee: Jack Mowat

== See also ==
- 1952–53 in Scottish football
- 1952–53 Scottish League Cup
