= Archie Glen =

Scottish footballer

Personal information
- Full name: Archibald Glen
- Date of birth: 16 April 1929
- Place of birth: Coalburn, Scotland
- Date of death: 30 August 1998 (aged 69)
- Place of death: Aberdeen, Scotland
- Height: 5 ft 10 1/2 in (1.79 m)
- Position: Left half

Youth career
- Ballochmyle Thistle
- –: Annbank United

Senior career*
Years	Team	Apps	(Gls)
1948–1960	Aberdeen	203	(24)

International career
1954–1958	Scottish League XI	7	(1)
1955	Scotland B vs A trial	1	(0)
1955–1956	Scotland	2	(0)
1956	Scotland B	1	(0)
- * Club domestic league appearances and goals

Archibald Glen (16 April 1929 – 30 August 1998) was a Scottish footballer who played as a left half for Aberdeen, where he spent his whole professional career. He made 270 appearances for the club in the three major domestic competitions, and helped Aberdeen win the 1954–55 league championship and the 1955 Scottish League Cup Final.

Glen also represented the Scotland national football team twice in the 1956 British Home Championship, and represented the Scottish League XI seven times between 1954 and 1958.

== Career statistics ==
=== Club ===
Appearances and goals by club, season and competition
Club	Season	League			Scottish Cup		League Cup		Europe		Total	
Club	Season	Division	Apps	Goals	Apps	Goals	Apps	Goals	Apps	Goals	Apps	Goals
Aberdeen	Scottish Division One	1947–48	0	0	0	0	0	0	0	0	0	0
Aberdeen	Scottish Division One	1948–49	4	1	0	0	0	0	0	0	4	1
Aberdeen	Scottish Division One	1949–50	1	0	0	0	2	0	0	0	3	0
Aberdeen	Scottish Division One	1950–51	7	0	0	0	1	0	0	0	8	0
Aberdeen	Scottish Division One	1951–52	0	0	0	0	0	0	0	0	0	0
Aberdeen	Scottish Division One	1952–53	5	0	0	0	0	0	0	0	5	0
Aberdeen	Scottish Division One	1953–54	27	0	5	0	0	0	0	0	32	0
Aberdeen	Scottish Division One	1954–55	30	4	6	0	6	0	0	0	42	4
Aberdeen	Scottish Division One	1955–56	27	4	1	0	10	1	0	0	38	5
Aberdeen	Scottish Division One	1956–57	29	4	2	0	6	0	0	0	37	4
Aberdeen	Scottish Division One	1957–58	26	2	3	0	7	0	0	0	36	2
Aberdeen	Scottish Division One	1958–59	33	7	7	0	6	0	0	0	46	7
Aberdeen	Scottish Division One	1959–60	14	2	0	0	5	2	0	0	19	4
Aberdeen	Total		203	24	24	0	43	3	0	0	270	27

=== International ===
Appearances and goals by national team and year
National team	Year	Apps	Goals
Scotland	1955	1	0
Scotland	1956	1	0
Total		2	0

== See also ==
- List of one-club men in association football
