= Paddy Buckley =

Scottish footballer

Personal information
- Full name: Patrick McCabe Buckley
- Date of birth: 31 January 1925
- Place of birth: Leith, Scotland
- Date of death: 4 November 2008 (aged 83)
- Place of death: Tranent, Scotland
- Position: Forward

Senior career*
Years	Team	Apps	(Gls)
–1948	Bo'ness United		
1948–1952	St Johnstone	100	(73)
1952–1957	Aberdeen	107	(58)
1958	Caledonian		
Total		207	(131)

International career
1954	Scotland	3	(1)
1954–1955	Scottish League XI	2	(0)
1955	Scotland A vs B trial	1	(2)
- * Club domestic league appearances and goals

Patrick McCabe Buckley (31 January 1925 – 4 November 2008) was a Scottish footballer who played as a striker for Bo'ness United, St Johnstone, Aberdeen and the Scotland national team.

== Life and career ==
Buckley, who was renowned for his speed, started his career with Junior club Bo'ness United. He was at the centre of a transfer dispute in 1948, when both Celtic and St Johnstone claimed to have signed him. The situation was eventually resolved in St Johnstone's favour and Buckley spent the next four seasons with the Perth side.

Buckley joined Aberdeen in a £7,500 transfer in April 1952 (£188,000 today) and it is for his time with the Dons for which he is best known. He helped them to the League championship in 1954–55 and the 1955 League Cup success. He also played in two Scottish Cup finals, 1953 and 1954, both of which were lost. He retired due to a serious knee injury in 1957 but briefly returned to the game with Highland League side Caledonian the following year.

Buckley was capped three times by Scotland, making his debut in a 1–0 win over Norway in 1954. Initially selected in the squad for the 1954 FIFA World Cup, injury saw him replaced by club colleague George Hamilton. He scored his only Scotland goal against Wales in a 1–0 win upon his return to fitness in October later that year.

Upon his death in November 2008, the Aberdeen players wore black armbands to commemorate his playing for the club, against St Mirren on 12 November 2008.

His son, Pat, was also a professional footballer.

== Career statistics ==
=== Club ===
Appearances and goals by club, season and competition
Club	Season	League			Scottish Cup		League Cup		Europe		Total	
Club	Season	Division	Apps	Goals	Apps	Goals	Apps	Goals	Apps	Goals	Apps	Goals
St Johnstone	1948–49	Scottish Division Two	-	-	-	-	-	-	0	0	-	-
St Johnstone	1949–50	Scottish Division Two	16	14	-	-	-	-	0	0	16+	14+
St Johnstone	1950–51	Scottish Division Two	-	-	-	-	-	-	0	0	-	-
St Johnstone	1951–52	Scottish Division Two	-	-	-	-	-	-	0	0	-	-
St Johnstone	Total		100	73	-	-	-	-	0	0	140	104
Aberdeen	1951–52	Scottish Division One	0	0	0	0	0	0	0	0	0	0
Aberdeen	1952–53	Scottish Division One	27	9	9	4	4	2	0	0	40	15
Aberdeen	1953–54	Scottish Division One	29	17	5	7	4	3	0	0	38	27
Aberdeen	1954–55	Scottish Division One	28	17	6	5	6	6	0	0	40	28
Aberdeen	1955–56	Scottish Division One	10	6	0	0	10	7	0	0	20	13
Aberdeen	1956–57	Scottish Division One	13	9	0	0	2	0	0	0	15	9
Aberdeen	Total		107	58	20	16	26	18	0	0	153	92
Career total			207	131	20+	16+	26+	18+	0	0	293	196

=== International ===
Appearances and goals by national team and year
National team	Year	Apps	Goals
Scotland	1954	3	1
Total		3	1

Scores and results list Scotland's goal tally first, score column indicates score after each Buckley goal

List of international goals scored by Paddy Buckley
No.	Date	Venue	Opponent	Score	Result	Competition
1	16 October 1954	Ninian Park, Cardiff, Wales	Wales	1–0	1–0	1954-55 British Home Championship
