= David Caldwell (footballer, born 1932) =

Scottish footballer

Dave Caldwell
Personal information
- Full name: David Lees Caldwell
- Date of birth: 7 May 1932
- Place of birth: Clydebank, Scotland
- Date of death: 2 August 2017 (aged 85)
- Place of death: Balbedie, Aberdeenshire, Scotland
- Position: Left back

Senior career*
Years	Team	Apps	(Gls)
- Duntocher Hibernian
1953–1960	Aberdeen	132	(0)
1960–1961	Rotherham United	1	(0)
1961	Toronto City		
1961–1963	Morton	25	(0)
–	Fraserburgh		
Total		158+	(0+)
- * Club domestic league appearances and goals

David Lees Caldwell (7 May 1932 – 2 August 2017) was a Scottish football player, who played for Aberdeen, Rotherham United and Greenock Morton. He won the Scottish Football League title in 1954–55 and the Scottish League Cup in 1955–56 with Aberdeen.

== Career statistics ==
=== Appearances and goals by club, season and competition ===
Club	Season	League			National Cup		League Cup		Europe		Total	
Club	Season	Division	Apps	Goals	Apps	Goals	Apps	Goals	Apps	Goals	Apps	Goals
Aberdeen	1953–54	Scottish Division One	27	0	5	0	3	0	0	0	35	0
Aberdeen	1954–55	Scottish Division One	5	0	2	0	0	0	0	0	7	0
Aberdeen	1955–56	Scottish Division One	27	0	1	0	9	0	0	0	37	0
Aberdeen	1956–57	Scottish Division One	33	0	2	0	2	0	0	0	37	0
Aberdeen	1957–58	Scottish Division One	26	0	3	0	8	0	0	0	37	0
Aberdeen	1958–59	Scottish Division One	8	0	3	0	2	0	0	0	13	0
Aberdeen	1959–60	Scottish Division One	6	0	0	0	6	0	0	0	12	0
Aberdeen	Total		132	0	16	0	30	0	0	0	178	0
Rotherham United	1960-61	Football League Second Division	1	0	-	-	-	-	-	-	1+	0+
Rotherham United	Total		1	0	-	-	-	-	-	-	1+	0+
Toronto City	1961	ECPSL	-	-	-	-	-	-	-	-	-	-
Greenock Morton	1961-62	Scottish Second Division	-	-	-	-	-	-	-	-	-	-
Greenock Morton	1962-63	Scottish Second Division	-	-	-	-	-	-	-	-	-	-
Greenock Morton	Total		25	0	-	-	-	-	-	-	25+	0+
Career total			158+	0+	16+	0+	30+	0+	0	0	204+	0+
