= Tommy Lowrie =

Scottish footballer

Personal information
- Full name: Thomas Lowrie
- Date of birth: 14 January 1928
- Place of birth: Glasgow, Scotland
- Date of death: 24 April 2009 (aged 81)
- Place of death: Bellshill, Scotland
- Position: Wing half

Youth career
- Troon Athletic

Senior career*
Years	Team	Apps	(Gls)
1947–1950	Manchester United	13	(0)
1950–1952	Aberdeen	29	(1)
1952–1955	Oldham Athletic	79	(5)
1955–1956	Stranraer	3	(2)
1956	Berwick Rangers	2	(0)
Total		126	(8)
- * Club domestic league appearances and goals

Thomas Lowrie (14 January 1928 – 24 April 2009) was a Scottish footballer.

Lowrie played for Troon Athletic as a youth, before joining English club Manchester United in 1947. He later played for Aberdeen, Oldham Athletic, Stranraer and Berwick Rangers before retiring in 1956. He went on to coach at East Kilbride Thistle. Lowrie died in 2009, aged 81.
