= Harry Yorston =

Scottish footballer (1929–1992)

Personal information
- Full name: Henry Bowmaker Yorston
- Date of birth: 9 June 1929
- Place of birth: Scotland
- Date of death: 17 May 1992 (aged 62)
- Place of death: Aberdeen, Scotland
- Position: Inside right

Youth career
- –1947: St. Clements

Senior career*
Years	Team	Apps	(Gls)
1947–1957	Aberdeen	202	(98)
1957–?	Buckie Thistle		

International career
1952	Scottish Football League XI	1	(0)
1954	Scotland	1	(0)
- * Club domestic league appearances and goals

Henry Bowmaker Yorston (9 June 1929 – 17 May 1992) was a Scottish professional football player, who played for Aberdeen, and represented Scotland once. Yorston made over 200 league appearances for Aberdeen, scoring 98 goals. His uncle Benny was also a professional footballer who, like his nephew, played for Aberdeen and the Scotland national side.

Yorston retired from professional football at the age of 28 after being offered a lucrative fish market porter job in Aberdeen. In 1972, he won £175,000 on the football pools. He died from brain cancer on 17 May 1992, at the age of 62.

== Career statistics ==
=== Club ===
Appearances and goals by club, season and competition
Club	Season	League			Scottish Cup		League Cup		Europe		Total	
Club	Season	Division	Apps	Goals	Apps	Goals	Apps	Goals	Apps	Goals	Apps	Goals
Aberdeen	1947–48	Scottish Division One	6	6	0	0	0	0	0	0	6	6
Aberdeen	1948–49	Scottish Division One	0	0	0	0	0	0	0	0	0	0
Aberdeen	1949–50	Scottish Division One	26	10	5	4	5	3	0	0	36	17
Aberdeen	1950–51	Scottish Division One	29	18	3	3	10	5	0	0	42	26
Aberdeen	1951–52	Scottish Division One	27	19	4	3	6	3	0	0	37	25
Aberdeen	1952–53	Scottish Division One	19	6	9	7	4	3	0	0	32	16
Aberdeen	1953–54	Scottish Division One	16	7	0	0	6	4	0	0	22	11
Aberdeen	1954–55	Scottish Division One	28	12	6	3	2	0	0	0	36	15
Aberdeen	1955–56	Scottish Division One	31	12	1	0	8	2	0	0	40	14
Aberdeen	1956–57	Scottish Division One	20	8	1	1	6	2	0	0	27	11
Aberdeen	Total		202	98	29	21	47	22	0	0	278	141

=== International ===
Appearances and goals by national team and year
National team	Year	Apps	Goals
Scotland	1954	1	0
Total		1	0
