= Ian Rodger =

English writer and translator

Ian Graham Rodger (14 June 1926 – 30 August 1984) was an English radio critic, author, and translator of Swedish texts into English. In 1982 he published Radio Drama, which was the first historical survey on the subject of radio dramatics.

== Early life and education ==
Born in Brentford, Rodger was educated at Westminster School. He joined the Royal Air Force Volunteer Reserve in 1944 and later served in the Intelligence Corps until his discharge from the armed forces in 1947.

He studied English at Durham University, graduating in 1952. He was an early staff member of the student newspaper, Palatinate, working alongside Harold Evans and Paul Edwards.

== Career ==
Rodger had stints as a reporter at the Newcastle Journal (1952–54) and the Scottish Daily Mail (1954–55); he then spent a year in Sweden as a freelance journalist. His sudden decision to take a boat to Stockholm was motivated by discomfort with the ethics of his employer, who had ordered him to "doorstep" a woman whose son had just been hanged.

On his return from Sweden he began scripting radio plays and was later hired by The Listener as a critic. He published a series of novels with a Swedish setting: The Sun is Dead (1959), Nine Flowers – A Novel in Summer (1961) and Seven Beds to Christmas (1967). A Hitch in Time: Recollection of a Journey (1966) looks back on his experiences hitchhiking around post-war Europe as a young man.

In 1977 he was the organiser of the first international conference devoted to radio drama. Held at Collingwood College, Durham, it attracted a "surprisingly large number of people from all over the world", including a group of German academics who had been studying and teaching British radio plays.

== Personal ==
Rodger married Irish broadcaster and writer Mary Russell and had three children. He died of motor neurone disease in 1984.

== Selected publications ==
=== Fiction ===
- Rodger, Ian (1959). The Sun Is Dead. London: Hutchinson.
- ——— (1961). Nine Flowers: A Novel in Summer. London: Hutchinson.
- ——— (1967). Seven Beds to Christmas. London: Hutchinson. ISBN 0090853407.

=== Non-fiction ===
- ——— (1961). Sweden: A Book of Photographs. London: Spring Books.
- ——— (1966). A Hitch in Time: Recollection of a Journey. London: Hutchinson.
- ——— (1982). Radio Drama. London: Macmillan. ISBN 0333294289.
