= Ian MacFarlane (footballer, born 1933) =

Scottish football player and manager (1933–2019)

Personal information
- Full name: Ian MacFarlane
- Date of birth: 26 January 1933
- Place of birth: Lanark, Scotland
- Date of death: 17 June 2019 (aged 86)
- Position: Full back

Senior career*
| Years | Team | Apps | (Gls) |
| 1955–1956 | Aberdeen | 16 | (0) |
| 1956–1958 | Chelsea | 40 | (0) |
| 1958–1959 | Leicester City | 1 | (0) |
| 1959–1967 | Bath City | 330 | (4) |
| Total | | 386 | (5) |

Managerial career
- 1970–1972: Carlisle United
- 1976: Sunderland (Caretaker)
- 1978: Leicester City (Caretaker)
- 1984: Yeovil Town
- * Club domestic league appearances and goals

Ian MacFarlane (26 January 1933 – 17 June 2019) was a Scottish football player and manager.

MacFarlane played for Aberdeen, Chelsea and Leicester City as a full back. At Bath City, he was managed, alongside Tony Book, by Malcolm Allison, who would go on to manage Manchester City.

MacFarlane managed Carlisle United from 1 January 1970 to 1 June 1972. Notable signings he made for Carlisle include John Gorman in September 1970 and Stanley Bowles in October 1971. He was caretaker manager of Sunderland from 18 October 1976 to 1 December 1976 for 7 games (2 wins, 1 draw, 4 losses. He was succeeded by Jimmy Adamson. He then managed Leicester City for 5 games in 1978 as caretaker manager, losing 4 and winning once. As an assistant manager, he won the Football League Cup with Manchester City.

MacFarlane died on 17 June 2019, at the age of 86.
