= Davie Shaw =

Scottish footballer, coach, and manager

Personal information
- Full name: David Shaw
- Date of birth: 5 May 1917
- Place of birth: Annathill, Scotland
- Date of death: 14 October 1977 (aged 60)
- Place of death: Aberdeen Scotland
- Height: 5 ft 7 1/2 in (1.71 m)
- Position: Left back

Youth career
- Banknock Juveniles

Senior career*
Years	Team	Apps	(Gls)
1938–1950	Hibernian	89	(0)
1938–1939	→ Grange Rovers (loan)		
1950–1953	Aberdeen	50	(1)

International career
1946	Scotland (wartime)	2	(0)
1946–1948	Scotland	9	(0)
1948	Scottish League XI	3	(0)

Managerial career
- 1955–1959: Aberdeen
- * Club domestic league appearances and goals

David Shaw (5 May 1917 – 14 October 1977) was a Scottish professional football player, coach and manager.

== Playing career ==
Shaw was a left back who played for Hibernian before and after World War II, including an appearance in the 1946–47 Scottish Cup final, and was captain of the league championship winning side of 1947–48; he later signed for Aberdeen, with one of his final appearances being the Scottish Cup Final of 1953 against Rangers.

Shaw's brother Jock was a Rangers player, and the brothers turned out together for the Scotland team in a match against Switzerland in 1946. This did not happen again until Gary and Steven Caldwell played together for the first time in a Scotland side in 2005. In all, Shaw made nine appearances for Scotland between 1946 and 1948.

== Coaching and managerial career ==
When his playing career was over, he stayed with Aberdeen and took up a coaching role.

Shaw was appointed coach by manager Dave Halliday, and was described by Bobby Wishart, the inside-forward in the league championship-winning side of 1954–55, as 'the secret ingredient' in the club's success. At the end of that championship season, Halliday left to take over as manager of Leicester, and Shaw was appointed manager in his place. His team won the Scottish League Cup at the first time of asking in 1955–56, but he was unable to repeat this early success, and despite one more Scottish Cup final in 1959, he stepped aside at the end of that season, returning to his previous role as coach under Tommy Pearson.

His death was reported in the match programme for Hibs' UEFA Europa League game against Östers IF.

== See also ==
- List of Scotland national football team captains
- List of Scotland wartime international footballers
- List of Scottish football families
