= 1963–64 Aberdeen F.C. season =

Aberdeen F.C.
1963–64 season
- Chairman: Charles B. Forbes
- Manager: Tommy Pearson
- Scottish League Division One: 9th
- Scottish Cup: 3rd Round
- Scottish League Cup: Group stage
- Summer Cup: Finalists
- Top goalscorer: League: Ernie Winchester (15); All: Ernie Winchester (25)
- Highest home attendance: 22,000 vs. Rangers, 13 March 1964
- Lowest home attendance: 3,400 vs. Queen of the South, 21 March 1964
Home colours

The 1963–64 season was Aberdeen 52nd season in the top flight of Scottish football and their 53rd season overall. Aberdeen competed in the Scottish League Division One, Scottish League Cup, Scottish Cup and the Summer Cup.

== Results ==
=== Division 1 ===
Match Day	Date	Opponent	H/A	Score	Aberdeen Scorer(s)	Attendance
1	21 August	Partick Thistle	A	1–1	Hume	9,000
2	7 September	Dundee	H	2–4	Cummings, Fraser	12,500
3	14 September	St Johnstone	A	1–3	Kinnell	8,700
4	21 September	St Mirren	H	0–2		8,000
5	28 September	Airdrieonians	A	7–1	Graham (2), Kinnell (2), Cooke, Hume, Thom	6,000
6	5 October	Third Lanark	H	1–1	Graham	10,000
7	12 October	Celtic	A	0–3		15,000
8	19 October	Kilmarnock	A	0–2		7,000
9	26 October	Falkirk	H	3–0	Winchester (2), Kerrigan	8,000
10	2 November	Heart of Midlothian	A	0–0		8,000
11	9 November	Rangers	A	0–0		34,000
12	16 November	Motherwell	H	6–2	Winchester (3), Kerrigan (2), Smith	8,500
13	23 November	Queen of the South	A	3–2	Graham, Kerrigan, Winchester	5,000
14	30 November	Hibernian	A	0–2		10,000
15	7 December	East Stirlingshire	H	4–1	Frickleton (own goal), Graham, Winchester, Kerrigan	7,000
16	14 December	Dundee United	A	2–1	Hume, Kerrigan	10,000
17	28 December	Partick Thistle	H	0–5		8,500
18	1 January	Dundee	A	4–1	Winchester (2), Cooke, Graham	15,000
19	2 January	St Johnstone	H	0–1		10,000
20	4 January	St Mirren	A	1–3	Winchester	5,000
21	18 January	Airdrieonians	H	2–2	Winchester, Kerrigan	7,500
22	1 February	Third Lanark	A	2–1	Hume, Cooke	6,000
23	8 February	Celtic	H	0–3		15,000
24	19 February	Kilmarnock	H	0–0		6,000
25	22 February	Falkirk	A	3–2	Winchester (2), Morrison	10,000
26	29 February	Heart of Midlothian	H	1–2	Winchester	10,000
27	11 March	Rangers	H	1–1	Winchester	22,000
28	14 March	Motherwell	A	1–0	Morrison	8,000
29	21 March	Queen of the South	H	3–0	Kerrigan (3)	3,400
30	28 March	Hibernian	H	3–1	Lister, Winchester, Kerrigan	5,000
31	4 April	East Stirlingshire	A	1–2	Smith	1,000
32	8 April	Dunfermline Athletic	H	0–1		4,000
33	18 April	Dundee United	H	0–0		3,500
34	24 April	Dunfermline Athletic	A	1–3	Kerrigan	5,500

==== Final standings ====
Pos	Team	Pld	W	D	L	GF	GA	GR	Pts
7	Partick Thistle	34	15	5	14	55	54	1.019	35
8	Dundee United	34	13	8	13	65	49	1.327	34
9	Aberdeen	34	12	8	14	53	53	1.000	32
10	Hibernian	34	12	6	16	59	66	0.894	30
11	Motherwell	34	9	11	14	51	62	0.823	29

Source: RSSSF

=== Scottish League Cup ===
==== Group 2 ====
Round	Date	Opponent	H/A	Score	Aberdeen Scorer(s)	Attendance
1	10 August	Dundee United	A	1–1	Cummings	15,000
2	14 August	St Mirren	H	2–2	Hume (2)	11,000
3	17 August	Hibernian	A	2–2	Hume, Little	10,000
4	24 August	Dundee United	H	2–0	Cummings, Hume	16,000
5	28 August	St Mirren	A	3–0	Winchester (2), Hume	7,000
6	31 August	Hibernian	H	0–2		20,000

==== Group 2 final table ====
Team	Pld	W	D	L	GF	GA	GR	Pts
Hibernian	6	4	2	0	15	7	2.143	10
Aberdeen	6	2	3	1	10	7	1.429	7
Dundee United	6	2	1	3	11	14	0.786	5
St Mirren	6	0	2	4	7	15	0.467	2

=== Scottish Cup ===
Round	Date	Opponent	H/A	Score	Aberdeen Scorer(s)	Attendance
R1	11 January	Hibernian	H	5–2	Winchester (2), Kerrigan (2), Hume	15,000
R2	25 January	Queen's Park	H	1–1	Winchester	13,300
R2R	29 January	Queen's Park	A	2–1	Hume, Smith	6,100
R4	15 February	Ayr United	H	1–2	Graham	10,300

=== 1964 Summer Cup ===
==== Group 1 ====
Round	Date	Opponent	H/A	Score	Aberdeen Scorer(s)	Attendance
1	2 May	St Johnstone	H	3–2	Kerr (2), Kerrigan	4,500
2	5 May	Dundee	A	0–1		????
3	9 May	Dundee United	A	1–4	Winchester	5,500
4	13 May	St Johnstone	A	2–0	Coutts, Morrison	????
5	16 May	Dundee	H	3–1	Kerr (2), McIntosh	9,000
6	20 May	Dundee United	H	5–0	Kerrigan (2), Morrison, Winchester, McIntosh	????

==== Group 1 final table ====
Pos	Team	Pld	W	D	L	GF	GA	GD	Pts
1	Aberdeen	6	4	0	2	14	8	+6	8
2	Dundee United	6	3	2	1	9	9	0	8
3	Dundee	6	2	3	1	12	9	+3	7
4	St Johnstone	6	0	1	5	5	14	−9	1

==== Knockout stage ====
Round	Date	Opponent	H/A	Score	Aberdeen Scorer(s)	Attendance
SFL1	23 May	Partick Thistle	A	0–1		15,000
SFL2	27 May	Partick Thistle	H	3–1	Winchester (3)	????

Final took place in August.

== Squad ==
=== Appearances & Goals ===
No.	Pos	Nat	Player	Total		Division One		Scottish Cup		League Cup	
No.	Pos	Nat	Player	Apps	Goals	Apps	Goals	Apps	Goals	Apps	Goals
	GK	(Scotland) SCO	John Ogston	44	0	34	0	4	0	6	0
	DF	(Scotland) SCO	Jimmy Hogg	42	0	32	0	4	0	6	0
	DF	(Scotland) SCO	Ally Shewan (c)	41	0	31	0	4	0	6	0
	DF	(Scotland) SCO	Doug Coutts	34	0	28	0	4	0	2	0
	DF	(Scotland) SCO	George Kinnell	17	3	11	3	0	0	6	0
	DF	(Scotland) SCO	Doug Fraser	9	1	3	1	0	0	6	0
	DF	(Scotland) SCO	Dave Bennett	5	0	5	0	0	0	0	0
	DF	(Scotland) SCO	Jim Anderson	4	0	3	0	0	0	1	0
	DF	(Scotland) SCO	Hugh Stewart	1	0	1	0	0	0	0	0
	MF	(Scotland) SCO	Dave Smith	43	3	33	2	4	1	6	0
	MF	(Scotland) SCO	Bobby Hume	33	11	23	4	4	2	6	5
	MF	(Scotland) SCO	Ian Burns	30	0	26	0	4	0	0	0
	MF	(Scotland) SCO	Ian Lister	11	1	11	1	0	0	0	0
	MF	(Scotland) SCO	Lewis Thom	10	1	10	1	0	0	0	0
	MF	(Scotland) SCO	Tommy Donaldson	2	0	2	0	0	0	0	0
	MF	(Scotland) SCO	Willie McIntosh	0	0	0	0	0	0	0	0
	FW	(Scotland) SCO	Ernie Winchester	34	21	27	16	4	3	3	2
	FW	(Scotland) SCO	Don Kerrigan	30	14	26	12	4	2	0	0
	FW	(Scotland) SCO	Charlie Cooke	30	3	22	3	4	0	4	0
	FW	(Scotland) SCO	Billy Little	19	1	10	0	3	0	6	1
	FW	??	Billy Graham	15	7	14	6	1	1	0	0
	FW	(England) ENG	Bobby Cummings	11	3	5	1	0	0	6	2
	FW	(Scotland) SCO	Tommy Morrison	9	2	9	2	0	0	0	0
	FW	(Scotland) SCO	Willie Allan	5	0	3	0	0	0	2	0
	FW	??	Alex Wilson	4	0	4	0	0	0	0	0
	FW	(Scotland) SCO	Andy Kerr	1	0	1	0	0	0	0	0
	FW	(Scotland) SCO	Ken Ronaldson	0	0	0	0	0	0	0	0

=== Unofficial Appearances & Goals ===
No.	Pos	Nat	Player	Summer Cup	
No.	Pos	Nat	Player	Apps	Goals
	GK	(Scotland) SCO	John Ogston	8	0
	DF	(Scotland) SCO	Doug Coutts	8	1
	DF	(Scotland) SCO	Ally Shewan (c)	8	0
	DF	(Scotland) SCO	Dave Bennett	6	0
	DF	(Scotland) SCO	Jimmy Hogg	2	0
	MF	(Scotland) SCO	Willie McIntosh	8	2
	MF	(Scotland) SCO	Ian Burns	8	0
	MF	(Scotland) SCO	Dave Smith	8	0
	MF	(Scotland) SCO	Ian Lister	4	0
	FW	(Scotland) SCO	Ernie Winchester	8	2
	FW	(Scotland) SCO	Andy Kerr	6	4
	FW	(Scotland) SCO	Don Kerrigan	6	3
	FW	(Scotland) SCO	Tommy Morrison	5	5
	FW	(Scotland) SCO	Billy Little	3	0

*Final played in the next season
