= 1964–65 Aberdeen F.C. season =

Aberdeen F.C.
1964–65 season
- Chairman: Charles B. Forbes
- Manager: Tommy Pearson (to February); Eddie Turnbull (from February)
- Scottish League Division One: 12th
- Scottish Cup: 1st Round
- Scottish League Cup: Group stage
- Summer Cup 1964: Finalists
- Summer Cup 1965: Group stage
- Top goalscorer: League: Ernie Winchester (14); All: Ernie Winchester (19)
- Highest home attendance: 30,000 vs. Rangers, 22 August 1964
- Lowest home attendance: 3,000 vs. Clyde, 19 January 1965
Home colours

The 1964–65 season was Aberdeen's 53rd season in the top flight of Scottish football and their 54th season overall. Aberdeen competed in the Scottish League Division One, Scottish League Cup, Scottish Cup and the Summer Cup.

== Results ==
Own goals in italics

=== Division 1 ===
Match Day	Date	Opponent	H/A	Score	Aberdeen Scorer(s)	Attendance
1	19 August	St Mirren	H	2–1	Winchester (2)	11,000
2	5 September	Dundee	A	1–3	Winchester	8,000
3	12 September	St Johnstone	H	5–5	Kerr (2), Little, Coutts, McKinven	5,000
4	19 September	Hibernian	A	2–4	Kerr	12,000
5	26 September	Partick Thistle	H	5–1	Kerr (2), Little, Kerrigan, McIntosh	5,000
6	3 October	Third Lanark	A	1–4	Little	3,000
7	10 October	Celtic	H	1–3	Winchester	13,000
8	17 October	Motherwell	H	0–1		5,000
9	24 October	Dunfermline Athletic	A	0–2		6,000
10	31 October	Falkirk	H	2–1	Morrison, Kerrigan	4,000
11	7 November	Rangers	A	2–2	Kerrigan, Morrison	30,000
12	14 November	Morton	H	2–1	Kerr, Morrison	5,000
13	21 November	Kilmarnock	H	1–1	Morrison	10,000
14	28 November	Dundee United	A	3–0	Kerrigan, Morrison, Lister	6,000
15	12 December	Heart of Midlothian	A	3–6	Kerrigan (2), Cooke	12,117
16	19 December	Clyde	H	0–3		3,500
17	26 December	St Mirren	A	0–4		4,500
18	1 January	Dundee	H	1–1	Winchester	8,000
19	9 January	Hibernian	H	1–1	Kerrigan	8,000
20	16 January	Partick Thistle	A	1–2	Fraser	5,000
21	27 January	Third Lanark	H	3–1	Ravn, Kerrigan, Fraser	9,000
22	30 January	Celtic	A	0–8		14,000
23	17 February	St Johnstone	A	4–2	Ravn (2), Winchester, Kerrigan	6,500
24	27 February	Dunfermline Athletic	H	2–2	Ravn, Morrison	7,000
25	6 March	Falkirk	A	1–0	Cummings	4,000
26	13 March	Rangers	H	2–0	Winchester, Kerrigan	25,000
27	20 March	Morton	A	1–1	Kerrigan	4,000
28	24 March	Airdrieonians	H	5–2	Winchester (3), Ravn, Kerrigan,	4,000
29	27 March	Kilmarnock	A	1–2	Kerrigan	6,500
30	3 April	Dundee United	H	1–0	Winchester	11,000
31	10 April	Airdrieonians	A	4–2	Winchester (2), Ravn, Fraser	4,000
32	14 April	Motherwell	A	2–2	Winchester, Fraser	5,000
33	17 April	Heart of Midlothian	H	0–3		15,000
34	24 April	Clyde	A	0–4		4,450

==== Final standings ====
Pos	Team	Pld	W	D	L	GF	GA	GAv	Pts
10	Morton	34	13	7	14	54	54	1.000	33
11	Partick Thistle	34	11	10	13	57	58	0.983	32
12	Aberdeen	34	12	8	14	59	75	0.787	32
13	St Johnstone	34	9	11	14	57	62	0.919	29
14	Motherwell	34	10	8	16	45	54	0.833	28

Source: RSSSF

=== 1964 Summer Cup ===
Continued from May

Round	Date	Opponent	H/A	Score	Aberdeen Scorer(s)	Attendance
Final L1	1 August	Hibernian	H	3–2	Kerr (2), Winchester	10,100
Final L2	5 August	Hibernian	A	1–2	Cooke	28,000
Final R	2 September	Hibernian	H	1–3	Winchester	?????

=== Scottish League Cup ===
==== Group 1 ====
Round	Date	Opponent	H/A	Score	Aberdeen Scorer(s)	Attendance
1	8 August	Rangers	A	0–4		45,000
2	12 August	St Johnstone	H	2–1	Kerrigan, Winchester	10,000
3	15 August	St Mirren	A	3–3	Hume, Cooke, Smith	5,000
4	22 August	Rangers	H	3–4	McIntosh, Kerr, Smith	30,000
5	26 August	St Johnstone	A	1–1	Smith	4,000
6	29 August	St Mirren	H	2–1	Winchester, Smith	7,000

==== Group 1 final table ====
Team	Pld	W	D	L	GF	GA	GR	Pts
Rangers	6	5	1	0	26	7	3.714	11
St Mirren	6	2	3	1	11	12	0.917	7
Aberdeen	6	1	3	2	11	15	0.733	5
St Johnstone	6	0	1	5	5	19	0.263	1

=== Scottish Cup ===
Round	Date	Opponent	H/A	Score	Aberdeen Scorer(s)	Attendance
R1	6 February	East Fife	H	0–0		10,100
R1R	9 February	East Fife	A	0–1		7,000

=== 1965 Summer Cup ===
==== Group 1 ====
Round	Date	Opponent	H/A	Score	Aberdeen Scorer(s)	Attendance
1	1 May	St Johnstone	A	0–2	Kerr (2), Winchester	4,000
2	5 May	Dundee	H	3–1	Wilson (2), Kerrigan	5,000
3	8 May	Dundee United	H	1–2	Fraser	6,000
4	12 May	St Johnstone	H	2–0	Ravn (2)	3,000
5	15 May	Dundee	A	2–1	Fraser, Smith	5,000
6	19 May	Dundee United	A	0–3		4,369

==== Group 1 final table ====
Pos	Team	Pld	W	D	L	GF	GA	GD	Pts
1	Dundee United	6	6	0	0	21	6	+15	12
2	Aberdeen	6	3	0	3	8	9	−1	6
3	Dundee	6	2	0	4	10	15	−5	4
4	St Johnstone	6	1	0	5	7	16	−9	2

== Squad ==
=== Appearances & Goals ===
No.	Pos	Nat	Player	Total		Division One		Scottish Cup		League Cup	
No.	Pos	Nat	Player	Apps	Goals	Apps	Goals	Apps	Goals	Apps	Goals
	GK	(Scotland) SCO	John Ogston	42	0	34	0	2	0	6	0
	DF	(Scotland) SCO	Ally Shewan (c)	42	0	34	0	2	0	6	0
	DF	(Scotland) SCO	Dave Bennett	29	0	21	0	2	0	6	0
	DF	(Scotland) SCO	John McCormick	25	0	23	0	2	0	0	0
	DF	(Scotland) SCO	Doug Coutts	18	1	11	1	1	0	6	0
	DF	(Scotland) SCO	Jimmy Hogg	15	0	15	0	0	0	0	0
	DF	(Scotland) SCO	Hugh Stewart	8	0	8	0	0	0	0	0
	DF	(Denmark) DEN	Jens Petersen	4	0	3	0	1	0	0	0
	DF	(Scotland) SCO	Jim Whyte	0	0	0	0	0	0	0	0
	MF	(Scotland) SCO	Dave Smith	41	4	33	0	2	0	6	4
	MF	(Scotland) SCO	Ian Burns	23	0	18	0	1	0	4	0
	MF	(Denmark) DEN	Leif Mortensen	16	1	14	1	2	0	0	0
	MF	(Scotland) SCO	Willie McIntosh	13	2	7	1	0	0	6	1
	MF	(Scotland) SCO	Bobby Hume	13	1	10	0	0	0	3	1
	MF	(Scotland) SCO	Tony Fraser	11	4	9	4	1	0	1	0
	MF	(Scotland) SCO	Ian Lister	11	1	10	1	0	0	1	0
	MF	(Scotland) SCO	Jimmy Wilson	0	0	0	0	0	0	0	0
	FW	(Scotland) SCO	Don Kerrigan	33	15	26	14	2	0	5	1
	FW	(Scotland) SCO	Ernie Winchester	29	15	21	13	2	0	6	2
	FW	(Scotland) SCO	Billy Little	21	3	21	3	0	0	0	0
	FW	(Scotland) SCO	Charlie Cooke	21	2	15	1	0	0	6	1
	FW	(Scotland) SCO	Andy Kerr	15	8	13	7	0	0	2	1
	FW	(Denmark) DEN	Jørgen Ravn	14	6	12	6	2	0	0	0
	FW	(Scotland) SCO	Tommy Morrison	12	5	12	5	0	0	0	0
	FW	(Scotland) SCO	Ken Ronaldson	3	0	1	0	0	0	2	0
	FW	??	Alex Wilson	2	0	2	0	0	0	0	0
	FW	(Scotland) SCO	John Cummings	1	1	1	1	0	0	0	0

=== Unofficial Appearances & Goals ===
No.	Pos	Nat	Player	Total		1964 Summer Cup Finals		1965 Summer Cup	
No.	Pos	Nat	Player	Apps	Goals	Apps	Goals	Apps	Goals
	GK	(Scotland) SCO	John Ogston	8	0	3	0	5	0
	GK	(Scotland) SCO	Bobby Clark	1	0	0	0	1	0
	DF	(Scotland) SCO	Ally Shewan (c)	9	0	3	0	6	0
	DF	(Scotland) SCO	Dave Bennett	9	0	3	0	6	0
	DF	(Scotland) SCO	Jim Whyte	6	0	0	0	6	0
	DF	(Scotland) SCO	John McCormick	5	0	0	0	5	0
	DF	(Scotland) SCO	Doug Coutts	3	0	3	0	0	0
	DF	(Scotland) SCO	Hugh Stewart	1	0	0	0	1	0
	MF	(Scotland) SCO	Dave Smith	9	1	3	0	6	1
	MF	(Scotland) SCO	Tony Fraser	7	2	1	0	6	2
	MF	(Scotland) SCO	Jimmy Wilson	5	2	0	0	5	2
	MF	(Scotland) SCO	Willie McIntosh	3	0	3	0	0	0
	MF	(Scotland) SCO	Ian Lister	3	0	0	0	3	0
	MF	(Denmark) DEN	Leif Mortensen	3	0	0	0	3	0
	MF	(Scotland) SCO	Ian Burns	1	0	1	0	0	0
	FW	(Scotland) SCO	Billy Little	6	0	0	0	6	0
	FW	(Scotland) SCO	Don Kerrigan	5	1	3	0	2	1
	FW	(Scotland) SCO	Ernie Winchester	4	2	3	2	1	0
	FW	(Denmark) DEN	Jørgen Ravn	3	2	0	0	3	2
	FW	(Scotland) SCO	Charlie Cooke	3	1	3	1	0	0
	FW	(Scotland) SCO	Andy Kerr	2	2	2	2	0	0
	FW	(Scotland) SCO	Tommy Morrison	2	0	2	0	0	0
	FW	(Scotland) SCO	Dave Millar	1	0	0	0	1	0
