= 1962–63 Aberdeen F.C. season =

Aberdeen F.C.
1962–63 season
- Chairman: Charles B. Forbes
- Manager: Tommy Pearson
- Scottish League Division One: 6th
- Scottish Cup: 4th Round
- Scottish League Cup: Group stage
- Top goalscorer: League: Bobby Cummings (18); All: Bobby Cummings (23)
- Highest home attendance: 36,000 vs. Rangers, 27 October 1962
- Lowest home attendance: 4,000 vs. Clyde, 6 April 1963
Home colours

The 1962–63 season was Aberdeen 51st consecutive season in the top flight of Scottish football and their 52nd season overall. Aberdeen competed in the Scottish League Division One, Scottish League Cup, and the Scottish Cup

== Results ==
Own goals in italics

=== Division 1 ===
Match Day	Date	Opponent	H/A	Score	Aberdeen Scorer(s)	Attendance
1	22 August	Airdrieonians	H	2–1	Callaghan, Winchester	12,000
2	8 September	Dundee	A	2–2	Cooke, Winchester	12,000
3	15 September	Dunfermline Athletic	H	4–0	Cooke (2), Winchester (2)	10,000
4	22 September	Celtic	A	2–1	Cooke, Cummings	29,000
5	29 September	Third Lanark	H	4–1	Thom (2), Cummings, Winchester	14,000
6	6 October	St Mirren	A	1–2	Little	7,000
7	13 October	Raith Rovers	H	10–0	Cummings (4), Winchester (3), Cooke, Little, Kinnell	9,000
8	20 October	Queen of the South	A	1–2	Cummings	5,500
9	27 October	Rangers	H	2–3	Cummings (2)	36,000
10	3 November	Heart of Midlothian	A	1–1	Cooke	20,000
11	10 November	Hibernian	H	3–0	Cummings (2), Smith	11,000
12	21 November	Motherwell	A	2–0	Cummings (2)	3,000
13	24 November	Falkirk	H	1–0	Smith	9,000
14	1 December	Clyde	A	3–1	Brownlee, Winchester, Smith	7,000
15	8 December	Dundee United	A	3–3	Cummings, Thom, Winchester	10,000
16	15 December	Partick Thistle	H	1–1	Kinnell	15,000
17	22 December	Kilmarnock	H	1–0	Winchester	14,000
18	1 January	Dundee	H	1–0	Winchester	15,000
19	5 January	Celtic	H	1–5	Winchester	15,000
20	16 February	St Mirren	H	0–1		8,000
21	9 March	Heart of Midlothian	H	2–1	Winchester (2)	11,000
22	16 March	Hibernian	A	3–2	Cooke, Cummings, Coutts	12,000
23	23 March	Motherwell	H	1–1	Winchester	10,000
24	26 March	Queen of the South	H	4–1	Cummings (2), Thom, Cooke	9,000
25	3 April	Falkirk	A	1–2	Winchester	10,000
26	6 April	Clyde	H	0–2		4,000
27	10 April	Airdrieonians	A	0–2		9,000
28	17 April	Dunfermline Athletic	A	0–3		3,716
29	20 April	Partick Thistle	A	3–2	Kinnell (3)	5,000
30	24 April	Third Lanark	A	2–1	Kinnell, Wilson	2,100
31	27 April	Kilmarnock	A	2–2	Little, Cummings	4,000
32	4 May	Raith Rovers	A	4–0	Kinnell (2), Little (2)	1,000
33	7 May	Dundee United	H	1–2	Kinnell	5,000
34	27 May	Rangers	A	2–2	Kinnell, Little	14,000

==== Final standings ====
Pos	Team	Pld	W	D	L	GF	GA	GR	Pts
4	Celtic	34	19	6	9	76	44	1.727	44
5	Hearts	34	17	9	8	85	59	1.441	43
6	Aberdeen	34	17	7	10	70	47	1.489	41
7	Dundee United	34	15	11	8	67	52	1.288	41
8	Dunfermline	34	13	8	13	50	47	1.064	34

Source: RSSSF

=== Scottish League Cup ===
==== Group 3 ====
Round	Date	Opponent	H/A	Score	Aberdeen Scorer(s)	Attendance
1	11 August	Partick Thistle	A	2–1	Mulhall, Brownlee	12,000
2	15 August	Motherwell	H	4–0	Mulhall, Little, Winchester, Cummings	11,500
3	18 August	Falkirk	H	3–0	Mulhall, Little	12,500
4	25 August	Partick Thistle	H	0–3		14,500
5	29 August	Motherwell	A	1–4	Brownlee	8,000
6	1 September	Falkirk	A	2–1	Winchester, Peacock	4,000

==== Group 3 final table ====
Team	Pld	W	D	L	GF	GA	GR	Pts
Partick Thistle (A)	6	4	1	1	12	5	2.400	9
Aberdeen	6	4	0	2	12	9	1.333	8
Motherwell	6	3	1	2	15	8	1.875	7
Falkirk	6	0	0	6	4	21	0.190	0

Source: statto.com
(A) Advanced to Supplementary Round

=== Scottish Cup ===
Round	Date	Opponent	H/A	Score	Aberdeen Scorer(s)	Attendance
R2	13 March	St Johnstone	A	2–1	Winchester, Cummings	9,000
R3	20 March	Dunfermline Athletic	H	4–0	Cummings (2), Kinnell	20,000
R4	30 March	Raith Rovers	A	1–2	Cummings	8,000

== Squad ==
=== Appearances & Goals ===
No.	Pos	Nat	Player	Total		Division One		Scottish Cup		League Cup	
No.	Pos	Nat	Player	Apps	Goals	Apps	Goals	Apps	Goals	Apps	Goals
	GK	(Scotland) SCO	John Ogston	43	0	34	0	3	0	6	0
	DF	(Scotland) SCO	Jimmy Hogg	43	0	34	0	3	0	6	0
	DF	(Scotland) SCO	George Kinnell (c)	42	12	34	10	3	2	5	0
	DF	(Scotland) SCO	Doug Coutts	35	1	31	1	3	0	1	0
	DF	(Scotland) SCO	Dave Bennett	26	0	22	0	3	0	1	0
	DF	(Scotland) SCO	Ally Shewan	18	0	12	0	0	0	6	0
	DF	(Scotland) SCO	Doug Fraser	13	0	8	0	0	0	5	0
	DF	(Scotland) SCO	Jim Anderson	1	0	1	0	0	0	0	0
	DF	(Scotland) SCO	Jim Cromar	0	0	0	0	0	0	0	0
	MF	(Scotland) SCO	Dave Smith	35	3	31	3	3	0	1	0
	MF	(Scotland) SCO	Lewis Thom	26	5	23	5	3	0	0	0
	MF	(Scotland) SCO	Ken Brownlee	14	3	9	1	0	0	5	2
	MF	(Scotland) SCO	George Mulhall	8	3	2	0	0	0	6	3
	MF	(Scotland) SCO	Willie Callaghan	2	1	1	1	0	0	1	0
	MF	(Scotland) SCO	Tommy Ring	2	0	2	0	0	0	0	0
	MF	(Scotland) SCO	Ian Burns	0	0	0	0	0	0	0	0
	FW	(England) ENG	Bobby Cummings	38	23	31	18	3	4	4	1
	FW	(Scotland) SCO	Charlie Cooke	36	8	27	8	3	0	6	0
	FW	(Scotland) SCO	Ernie Winchester	34	19	25	16	3	1	6	2
	FW	(Scotland) SCO	Willie Allan	31	0	26	0	3	0	2	0
	FW	(Scotland) SCO	Billy Little	21	8	16	6	0	0	5	2
	FW	??	Alex Wilson	5	1	5	1	0	0	0	0
