= Kinnell =

Kinnell may refer to:

== People ==
- Andy Kinnell (born 1947), Scottish footballer
- Galway Kinnell (1927–2014), American poet
- George Kinnell (1937–2021), Scottish footballer
- Gordon Kinnell (born 1891), English Anglican priest
- Murray Kinnell (1889–1954), English actor

== Places ==
- Kinnell, Angus, a location in Scotland
- Kinnell Stone Circle (or Killin Stone Circle) in Perthshire
