= 1961–62 Aberdeen F.C. season =

Aberdeen F.C.
1961–62 season
- Chairman: Charles B. Forbes
- Manager: Tommy Pearson
- Scottish League Division One: 12th
- Scottish Cup: 3rd Round
- Scottish League Cup: Group stage
- Top goalscorer: League: Billy Little (17); All: Billy Little (25)
- Highest home attendance: 41,139 vs. Rangers, 17 February 1962
- Lowest home attendance: 3,000 (x2) vs. Falkirk, 28 March 1962 vs. Kilmarnock 31 March 1962
Home colours

The 1961–62 season was Aberdeen's 50th season in the top flight of Scottish football and their 51st season overall. Aberdeen competed in the Scottish League Division One, Scottish League Cup, and the Scottish Cup

== Results ==
=== Division 1 ===
Match Day	Date	Opponent	H/A	Score	Aberdeen Scorer(s)	Attendance
1	23 August	Stirling Albion	H	7–0	Little (3), Cummings (2), Baird	9,000
2	9 September	St Johnstone	A	1–4	Little	10,500
3	16 September	Dundee	H	3–1	Kinnell, Brownlee, Cooke	12,000
4	23 September	Airdrieonians	A	1–7	Mulhall	3,000
5	30 September	Partick Thistle	H	1–3	Ewan	6,000
6	7 October	St Mirren	A	2–3	Cooke, Herron	5,000
7	14 October	Heart of Midlothian	H	0–2		10,000
8	21 October	Falkirk	A	1–0	Little	6,000
9	28 October	Motherwell	H	3–0	Little (2), Callaghan	7,000
10	4 November	Hibernian	A	1–1	Callaghan	5,000
11	11 November	Third Lanark	H	2–0	Callaghan (2)	8,000
12	18 November	Dunfermline Athletic	A	0–4		7,998
13	25 November	Celtic	H	0–0		15,000
14	2 December	Kilmarnock	A	2–4	Baird, Little	7,500
15	16 December	Dundee United	H	1–3	Baird	7,000
16	23 December	Rangers	A	4–2	Brownlee, Mulhall, Cooke, Kinnell	28,000
17	6 January	Stirling Albion	A	0–3		4,313
18	10 January	St Johnstone	H	1–1	Little	4,500
19	13 January	Airdrieonians	H	1–1	Little	4,200
20	17 January	Dundee	A	1–2		13,000
21	20 January	Partick Thistle	A	2–4	Pearson, Little	10,000
22	23 January	Raith Rovers	H	3–3	Callaghan, Cooke, Mulhall	7,000
23	3 February	St Mirren	H	3–1	Little (2), Cooke	8,000
24	10 February	Heart of Midlothian	A	1–1	Little	14,000
25	24 February	Motherwell	A	3–1	Little (2), Mulhall	5,000
26	3 March	Hibernian	H	1–2	Callaghan	6,000
27	17 March	Dunfermline Athletic	H	1–4		5,509
28	20 March	Third Lanark	A	5–3	Brownlee (2), Cummings, Callaghan, Allan	6,000
29	24 March	Celtic	A	0–2		21,000
30	28 March	Falkirk	H	2–2	Little, Mulhall	3,000
31	31 March	Kilmarnock	H	3–3	Cummings, Mulhall	3,000
32	7 April	Dundee United	A	2–2	Mulhall, Ewan	7,000
33	25 April	Rangers	H	1–0	Cummings	22,000
34	28 April	Raith Rovers	A	1–3	Mulhall	5,000

==== Final standings ====
Pos	Team	Pld	W	D	L	GF	GA	GR	Pts
10	Dundee United	34	13	6	15	70	71	0.986	32
11	Third Lanark	34	13	5	16	59	60	0.983	31
12	Aberdeen	34	10	9	15	60	73	0.822	29
13	Raith Rovers	34	10	7	17	51	73	0.699	27
14	Falkirk	34	11	4	19	45	68	0.662	26

Source: RSSSF

=== Scottish League Cup ===
==== Group 2 ====
Round	Date	Opponent	H/A	Score	Aberdeen Scorer(s)	Attendance
1	12 August	Dunfermline Athletic	A	2–1	Little, Brownlee	12,000
2	16 August	Motherwell	H	3–4	Brownlee, Little, Kinnell	18,000
3	19 August	Dundee United	A	3–5	Cooke (2), Cummings	10,000
4	26 August	Dunfermline Athletic	H	0–0		10,000
5	30 August	Motherwell	A	1–2	Little	7,000
6	2 September	Dundee United	H	2–2	Baird, Cooke	7,000

==== Group 2 final table ====
Team	Pld	W	D	L	GF	GA	GR	Pts
Motherwell	6	4	1	1	14	10	1.400	9
Dunfermline Athletic	6	2	3	1	7	3	2.333	7
Aberdeen	6	1	2	3	11	14	0.786	4
Dundee United	6	1	2	3	10	15	0.667	4

=== Scottish Cup ===
Round	Date	Opponent	H/A	Score	Aberdeen Scorer(s)	Attendance
R1	9 December	Airdrieonians	H	5–2	Callaghan (3), Kinnell, Little	8,800
R2	27 January	Clyde	A	2–2	Cummings, Little	10,000
R2R	31 January	Clyde	H	10–3	Cummings (5), Little (2), Mulhall (2), Fraser	16,400
R3	17 February	Rangers	H	2–2	Kinnell, Little	41,139
R3R	21 February	Rangers	A	1–5	Cummings	57,600

=== Anglo-Franco-Scottish Friendship Cup ===
Round	Date	Opponent	H/A	Score	Aberdeen Scorer(s)	Attendance
L1	10 October	Le Havre	H	2–0	Herron, Cooke	
L2	6 May	Le Havre	A	5–2	Kinnell, Mulhall, Winchester	2,000

== Squad ==
=== Appearances & Goals ===
No.	Pos	Nat	Player	Total		Division One		Scottish Cup		League Cup	
No.	Pos	Nat	Player	Apps	Goals	Apps	Goals	Apps	Goals	Apps	Goals
	GK	(Scotland) SCO	John Ogston	42	0	31	0	5	0	6	0
	GK	(England) ENG	Chris Harker	3	0	3	0	0	0	0	0
	DF	(Scotland) SCO	George Kinnell (c)	44	6	33	3	5	2	6	1
	DF	(Scotland) SCO	Dave Bennett	26	0	21	0	5	0	0	0
	DF	(Scotland) SCO	Doug Fraser	39	1	28	0	5	1	6	0
	DF	(Scotland) SCO	Andy Cadenhead	29	0	22	0	1	0	6	0
	DF	(Scotland) SCO	Jimmy Hogg	27	0	18	0	4	0	5	0
	DF	(Scotland) SCO	Doug Coutts	7	0	6	0	0	0	1	0
	DF	(Scotland) SCO	Ally Shewan	7	0	7	0	0	0	0	0
	MF	(Scotland) SCO	George Mulhall	42	11	32	9	4	2	6	0
	MF	(Scotland) SCO	Ken Brownlee	34	6	27	4	2	0	5	2
	MF	(Scotland) SCO	Ian Burns	26	0	19	0	4	0	3	0
	MF	(Scotland) SCO	Willie Callaghan	24	10	23	7	1	3	0	0
	MF	(Scotland) SCO	Dickie Ewen	8	2	4	2	4	0	0	0
	MF	(Scotland) SCO	Lewis Thom	3	0	2	0	1	0	0	0
	MF	(Scotland) SCO	Des Herron	2	1	2	1	0	0	0	0
	MF	(Scotland) SCO	Dave Smith	2	0	2	0	0	0	0	0
	FW	(Scotland) SCO	Billy Little	40	25	30	17	5	5	5	3
	FW	(Scotland) SCO	Charlie Cooke	39	7	29	5	5	0	5	2
	FW	(England) ENG	Bobby Cummings	25	15	15	6	4	7	6	2
	FW	(Scotland) SCO	Hugh Baird	11	5	5	4	0	0	6	1
	FW	(Scotland) SCO	Willie Allan	6	1	6	1	0	0	0	0
	FW	(Scotland) SCO	Jim Hosie	4	0	4	0	0	0	0	0
	FW	(Australia) AUS	Jim Pearson	3	1	3	1	0	0	0	0
	FW	(Scotland) SCO	Ernie Winchester	2	0	2	0	0	0	0	0
	FW	(Bermuda) BER	Eversley Lewis	0	0	0	0	0	0	0	0

=== Unofficial Appearances & Goals ===
No.	Pos	Nat	Player	Anglo-Franco-Scottish Friendship Cup	
No.	Pos	Nat	Player	Apps	Goals
	GK	(England) ENG	Chris Harker	1	0
	GK	(Scotland) SCO	John Ogston	1	0
	DF	(Scotland) SCO	George Kinnell (c)	2	3
	DF	(Scotland) SCO	Dave Bennett	2	0
	DF	(Scotland) SCO	Ally Shewan	1	0
	DF	(Scotland) SCO	Jimmy Hogg	1	0
	DF	(Scotland) SCO	Doug Coutts	1	0
	DF	(Scotland) SCO	Doug Fraser	1	0
	DF	(Scotland) SCO	Andy Cadenhead	1	0
	MF	(Scotland) SCO	George Mulhall	2	1
	MF	(Scotland) SCO	Ken Brownlee	2	0
	MF	(Scotland) SCO	Des Herron	1	1
	MF	(Scotland) SCO	Ian Burns	1	0
	MF	(Scotland) SCO	Willie Callaghan	1	0
	FW	(Scotland) SCO	Charlie Cooke	2	1
	FW	(Scotland) SCO	Ernie Winchester	1	1
	FW	(England) ENG	Bobby Cummings	1	0
	FW	(Scotland) SCO	Jim Hosie	1	0
