= Ernie Winchester =

Scottish footballer

Personal information
- Full name: Ernest Winchester
- Date of birth: 18 May 1944
- Place of birth: Aberdeen, Scotland
- Date of death: 8 May 2013 (aged 68)
- Place of death: Watford, England
- Height: 5 ft 11 in (1.80 m)
- Position: Striker

Youth career
- Torry School

Senior career*
Years	Team	Apps	(Gls)
1959–1967	Aberdeen	123	(71)
1967	Chicago Spurs	13	(13)
1968	Kansas City Spurs	27	(10)
1968–1972	Heart of Midlothian	48	(6)
1972–1973	Arbroath	33	(0)
Total		244	(100)
- * Club domestic league appearances and goals

Ernie Winchester (18 May 1944 – 8 May 2013) was a Scottish professional football striker who played for Aberdeen, Chicago Spurs, Kansas City Spurs, Heart of Midlothian and Arbroath.

== Football career ==
He signed for his local professional club, Aberdeen FC, in 1959. He finished as the club's top scorer in 1964 and 1966. After 169 appearances and 91 goals in all competitions, he moved to the United States to play in the NASL in 1967. In his first season, he played for Chicago Spurs and scored 13 goals in 13 games. The franchise moved to become the Kansas City Spurs, where he played in 1968 and scored 10 goals in 27 games.

In 1968, he moved back to Scotland to play for Heart of Midlothian and Arbroath. He retired in 1973.

== Personal life ==
Winchester was born in Aberdeen in 1944. He died on 8 May 2013, aged 68, 10 days shy of his 69th birthday.

== Career statistics ==
=== Appearances and goals by club, season and competition ===
Appearances and goals by club, season and competition
Club	Season	League			National Cup		League Cup		Europe		Total	
Club	Season	Division	Apps	Goals	Apps	Goals	Apps	Goals	Apps	Goals	Apps	Goals
Aberdeen	1959-60	Scottish Division One	0	0	0	0	0	0	0	0	0	0
Aberdeen	1960-61	Scottish Division One	0	0	0	0	0	0	0	0	0	0
Aberdeen	1961-62	Scottish Division One	2	0	0	0	0	0	0	0	2	0
Aberdeen	1962-63	Scottish Division One	25	16	3	1	6	2	0	0	34	19
Aberdeen	1963-64	Scottish Division One	27	16	4	3	3	2	0	0	34	21
Aberdeen	1964-65	Scottish Division One	21	13	2	0	6	2	0	0	29	15
Aberdeen	1965-66	Scottish Division One	20	16	5	4	5	1	0	0	40	21
Aberdeen	1966-67	Scottish Division One	18	10	1	1	10	5	0	0	29	16
Aberdeen	Total		123	71	15	9	30	12	0	0	168	92
Chicago Spurs	1967	National Professional Soccer League	13	13	-	-	-	-	-	-	13+	13+
Chicago Spurs	Total		13	13	-	-	-	-	-	-	13+	13+
Kansas City Spurs	1968	North American Soccer League	27	10	-	-	-	-	-	-	27+	10+
Kansas City Spurs	Total		27	10	-	-	-	-	-	-	27+	10+
Heart of Midlothian	1968-69	Scottish Division One	1	0	0	0	0	0	0	0	1	0
Heart of Midlothian	1969-70	Scottish Division One	16	3	1	0	6	4	0	0	23	8
Heart of Midlothian	1970-71	Scottish Division One	9	1	1	0	3	0	0	0	13	1
Heart of Midlothian	1971-72	Scottish Division One	22	2	1	1	0	0	0	0	23	3
Heart of Midlothian	Total		48	6	3	1	9	4	0	0	60	12
Arbroath	1972-73	Scottish Division One	33	0	2	0	6	0	0	0	41	0
Arbroath	Total		33	0	2	0	6	0	0	0	41	0
Career total			244	100	20	10	45	16	0	0	309+	126+
