= 1958–59 Aberdeen F.C. season =

Aberdeen F.C.
1958–59 season
- Chairman: William Mitchell
- Manager: Davie Shaw
- Scottish League Division One: 13th
- Scottish Cup: Finalists
- Scottish League Cup: Group stage
- Top goalscorer: League: Billy Little (13); All: Billy Little (16)
- Highest home attendance: 20,000 vs. Celtic, 27 September 1958 vs. Hibernian, 18 October 1958
- Lowest home attendance: 4,500 vs. Third Lanark, 11 March 1959
Home colours

The 1958–59 season was Aberdeen's 47th season in the top flight of Scottish football and their 48th season of club. Aberdeen competed in the Scottish League Division One, Scottish League Cup, and the Scottish Cup

== Results ==
=== Division 1 ===
Match Day	Date	Opponent	H/A	Score	Aberdeen Scorer(s)	Attendance
1	20 August	Airdrieonians	H	0–1		15,000
2	6 September	Dundee	A	1–2	Little	10,000
3	13 September	Dunfermline Athletic	H	4–0	Wishart (2), Little, Ewan	7,500
4	20 September	Third Lanark	A	2–0	Clydesdale, Little	8,000
5	27 September	Celtic	H	3–1	Glen, Little, Mulhall	20,000
6	4 October	Partick Thistle	A	3–2	Hather (2), Ewan	8,000
7	11 October	Stirling Albion	A	2–3	Glen (2)	9,460
8	18 October	Hibernian	H	4–0	Little (3), Glen	20,000
9	25 October	Falkirk	H	5–0	Baird (4), Ewan	17,000
10	1 November	Kilmarnock	A	0–2		6,000
11	8 November	St Mirren	A	5–1	Baird (2), Little (2), Ewan	7,000
12	15 November	Raith Rovers	H	2–2	Hather, Little	17,000
13	22 November	Clyde	A	0–4		7,000
14	29 November	Queen of the South	H	5–0	Little (2), Wishart, Glen, Baird	10,000
15	6 December	Heart of Midlothian	A	1–5	Wishart	22,000
16	13 December	Motherwell	H	0–4		14,000
17	20 December	Rangers	H	1–3	Baird	18,000
18	27 December	Airdrieonians	A	1–2	Ewan	7,000
19	1 January	Dundee	H	1–1	Wishart	12,000
20	3 January	Dunfermline Athletic	A	1–1	Hather	6,000
21	24 January	Partick Thistle	H	3–4	Hather (2), Baird	10,000
22	7 February	Stirling Albion	H	4–1	Davidson (2), Wishart, Little	6,000
23	18 February	Hibernian	A	0–1		4,000
24	21 February	Falkirk	A	1–5	Baird	18,000
25	4 March	Kilmarnock	H	2–2	Hatcher, Glen	5,000
26	7 March	St Mirren	H	2–1	Ewan, Davidson	10,000
27	11 March	Third Lanark	H	3–3	Ewan, Glen, Wishart	4,500
28	18 March	Raith Rovers	A	1–0	Baird	5,000
29	21 March	Clyde	H	1–2	Baird	10,000
30	25 March	Celtic	A	0–4		5,000
31	28 March	Queen of the South	A	1–2	Wishart	4,000
32	11 April	Motherwell	A	0–2		5,000
33	15 April	Heart of Midlothian	H	2–4	Ewan, Clunie	18,000
34	18 April	Rangers	A	2–1	Davidson (2)	40,000

==== Final standings ====
Pos	Team	Pld	W	D	L	GF	GA	GR	Pts
11	Third Lanark	34	11	10	13	74	83	0.892	32
12	Stirling Albion	34	11	8	15	54	64	0.844	30
13	Aberdeen	34	12	5	17	63	66	0.955	29
14	Raith Rovers	34	10	9	15	60	70	0.857	29
15	Clyde	34	12	4	18	62	66	0.939	28

Source: RSSSF

=== Scottish League Cup ===
==== Group 4 ====
Round	Date	Opponent	H/A	Score	Aberdeen Scorer(s)	Attendance
1	9 August	Kilmarnock	A	2–1	Davidson, Wishart	6,000
2	13 August	Hibernian	H	2–2	Wishart	15,000
3	16 August	Falkirk	H	5–1	Mulhall (2), Hather (2), Wishart,	12,000
4	23 August	Kilmarnock	H	0–2		14,000
5	27 August	Hibernian	A	2–4	Little, Kelly	16,000
6	30 August	Falkirk	A	1–1	Wishart	6,000

==== Group 4 final table ====
Team	Pld	W	D	L	GF	GA	GR	Pts
Kilmarnock	6	4	0	2	12	6	2.000	8
Hibernian	6	4	0	2	14	10	1.400	8
Aberdeen	6	2	1	3	11	11	1.000	5
Falkirk	6	1	1	4	7	17	0.412	3

=== Scottish Cup ===
Round	Date	Opponent	H/A	Score	Aberdeen Scorer(s)	Attendance
R1	31 January	East Fife	H	2–1	Davidson, Little	14,000
R2	14 February	Arbroath	H	3–0	Davidson, Baird, Hather	15,600
R3	28 February	St Johnstone	A	2–1	Davidson, Wishart	14,000
QF	14 March	Kilmarnock	H	3–1	Little, Davidson, Hather	19,000
SF	4 April	Third Lanark	N	1–1	Davidson	25,000
SFR	8 April	Third Lanark	N	1–0	Davidson	17,500
F	25 April	St Mirren	N	1–3	Baird	108,591

== Squad ==
=== Appearances & Goals ===
No.	Pos	Nat	Player	Total		Division One		Scottish Cup		League Cup	
No.	Pos	Nat	Player	Apps	Goals	Apps	Goals	Apps	Goals	Apps	Goals
	GK	(Scotland) SCO	Reg Morrison	30	0	23	0	1	0	6	0
	GK	(Scotland) SCO	Fred Martin	14	0	8	0	6	0	0	0
	GK	(Scotland) SCO	John Ogston	3	0	3	0	0	0	0	0
	DF	(Scotland) SCO	Jimmy Hogg	44	0	32	0	6	0	6	0
	DF	(Scotland) SCO	Jim Clunie	40	1	28	1	7	0	5	0
	DF	(Scotland) SCO	Willie Clydedale	29	1	24	1	3	0	2	0
	DF	(Scotland) SCO	Dave Caldwell	13	0	8	0	3	0	2	0
	DF	(Scotland) SCO	Jimmy Walker	12	0	7	0	3	0	2	0
	DF	(Canada) CAN	Willie Logie	7	0	5	0	2	0	0	0
	DF	??	Bertie Gibson	4	0	4	0	0	0	0	0
	MF	(Scotland) SCO	Archie Glen (c)	46	7	33	7	7	0	6	0
	MF	(Scotland) SCO	Bob Wishart	45	13	32	8	7	1	6	4
	MF	(Scotland) SCO	Dickie Ewen	36	8	26	8	5	0	5	0
	MF	(Scotland) SCO	Ian Burns	30	0	21	0	3	0	6	0
	MF	(Scotland) SCO	Ken Brownlee	7	0	5	0	1	0	1	0
	MF	(Scotland) SCO	George Mulhall	5	3	4	1	0	0	1	2
	MF	(Scotland) SCO	Arthur Paterson	2	0	2	0	0	0	0	0
	MF	(Scotland) SCO	Alistair Patience	2	0	2	0	0	0	0	0
	MF	(Scotland) SCO	Jim Cooper	1	0	1	0	0	0	0	0
	FW	(England) ENG	Jack Hather	42	11	29	7	7	2	6	2
	FW	(Scotland) SCO	Billy Little	39	16	29	13	4	2	6	1
	FW	(Scotland) SCO	Hugh Baird	30	14	25	12	5	2	0	0
	FW	(Scotland) SCO	Norman Davidson	30	12	19	5	7	6	4	1
	FW	(Scotland) SCO	Bobby Kelly	3	1	1	0	0	0	2	1
	FW	(Scotland) SCO	Andy Walker	2	0	2	0	0	0	0	0
	FW	(Scotland) SCO	Graham McInnes	1	0	1	0	0	0	0	0
