= 1965–66 Aberdeen F.C. season =

Aberdeen F.C.
1965–66 season
- Chairman: Charles B. Forbes
- Manager: Eddie Turnbull
- Scottish League Division One: 8th
- Scottish Cup: Semi-finalists
- Scottish League Cup: Group stage
- Top goalscorer: League: Ernie Winchester (15); All: Ernie Winchester (19)
- Highest home attendance: 24,000 vs. Rangers, 4 September 1965
- Lowest home attendance: 4,000 x2 vs. Falkirk, 20 November 1965 vs. Motherwell, 23 April 1966
Home colours

The 1965–66 season was Aberdeen's 54th season in the top flight of Scottish football and their 55th season overall. Aberdeen competed in the Scottish League Division One, Scottish League Cup and Scottish Cup.

== Results ==
Own goals in italics

=== Division 1 ===
| Match Day | Date | Opponent | H/A | Score | Aberdeen Scorer(s) | Attendance |
|---|---|---|---|---|---|---|
| 1 | 25 August | Stirling Albion | H | 2–2 | Winchester, Little | 7,000 |
| 2 | 11 September | St Johnstone | A | 2–2 | Shewan, Ravn | 6,000 |
| 3 | 18 September | Dundee | H | 2–3 | Little, Wilson | 8,000 |
| 4 | 25 September | Celtic | A | 1–7 | Winchester | 20,000 |
| 5 | 2 October | St Mirren | H | 4–1 | White, Shewan, Riddell, Finnie | 5,000 |
| 6 | 9 October | Hamilton Academical | A | 4–0 | Little, Wilson, White, Finnie | 2,500 |
| 7 | 16 October | Dunfermline Athletic | H | 2–2 | Winchester, Whyte | 7,000 |
| 8 | 23 October | Clyde | A | 2–2 | Scott, Winchester | 1,500 |
| 9 | 30 October | Heart of Midlothian | A | 1–1 | Whyte | 10,541 |
| 10 | 6 November | Kilmarnock | H | 3–1 | Melrose | 8,000 |
| 11 | 13 November | Partick Thistle | A | 3–0 | Little (2), Winchester | 5,000 |
| 12 | 20 November | Falkirk | H | 2–0 | Winchester, Wilson | 4,000 |
| 13 | 27 November | Morton | A | 3–1 | Winchester, White, Wilson | 6,000 |
| 14 | 11 December | Dundee United | H | 0–0 | | 10,000 |
| 15 | 18 December | Motherwell | A | 0–1 | | 5,500 |
| 16 | 25 December | Hibernian | H | 1–3 | White | 9,000 |
| 17 | 3 January | St Johnstone | H | 2–3 | Wilson, Little | 6,000 |
| 18 | 8 January | Stirling Albion | A | 1–2 | Little | 3,035 |
| 19 | 15 January | Celtic | H | 3–1 | Ravn, Winchester, Little | 18,000 |
| 20 | 22 January | St Mirren | A | 0–1 | | 4,500 |
| 21 | 29 January | Hamilton Academical | H | 5–2 | Winchester (3), Ravn, Wilson | 8,000 |
| 22 | 26 February | Heart of Midlothian | H | 0–1 | | 12,000 |
| 23 | 2 March | Clyde | H | 2–0 | Winchester | 6,000 |
| 24 | 9 March | Kilmarnock | A | 3–1 | Beattie, Melrose, D. Smith | 5,000 |
| 25 | 12 March | Partick Thistle | H | 2–1 | Little, Winchester | 8,500 |
| 26 | 19 March | Falkirk | A | 0–3 | | 4,000 |
| 27 | 21 March | Dunfermline Athletic | A | 3–2 | Wilson, Lunn, Winchester | 6,000 |
| 28 | 4 April | Morton | H | 5–3 | Melrose, Winchester, D. Smith, Little, Wilson, | 3,500 |
| 29 | 9 April | Rangers | A | 0–1 | | 18,000 |
| 30 | 13 April | Rangers | H | 1–2 | Melrose | 16,000 |
| 31 | 16 April | Dundee United | A | 0–3 | | 7,000 |
| 32 | 20 April | Dundee | A | 2–1 | J. Smith, D. Smith | 5,500 |
| 33 | 23 April | Motherwell | H | 1–2 | Melrose | 4,000 |
| 34 | 30 April | Hibernian | A | 1–0 | Melrose | 8,000 |

==== Final standings ====
| Pos | Team | Pld | W | D | L | GF | GA | GD | Pts |
|---|---|---|---|---|---|---|---|---|---|
| 6 | Hibernian | 34 | 16 | 6 | 12 | 81 | 55 | +26 | 38 |
| 7 | Hearts | 34 | 13 | 12 | 9 | 56 | 48 | +8 | 38 |
| 8 | Aberdeen | 34 | 15 | 6 | 13 | 61 | 54 | +7 | 36 |
| 9 | Dundee | 34 | 14 | 6 | 14 | 61 | 61 | 0 | 34 |
| 10 | Falkirk | 34 | 15 | 1 | 18 | 48 | 72 | −24 | 31 |

Source: RSSSF

=== Scottish League Cup ===
==== Group 2 ====
| Round | Date | Opponent | H/A | Score | Aberdeen Scorer(s) | Attendance |
|---|---|---|---|---|---|---|
| 1 | 14 August | Clyde | A | 2–1 | Scott, White | 4,000 |
| 2 | 18 August | Heart of Midlothian | H | 1–1 | White | 18,000 |
| 3 | 21 August | Rangers | H | 2–0 | Little, Ravn | 24,000 |
| 4 | 28 August | Clyde | H | 3–0 | Winchester, Wilson | 12,000 |
| 5 | 1 September | Hearts | A | 0–2 | | 11,000 |
| 6 | 4 September | Rangers | A | 0–4 | | 45,000 |

==== Group 2 final table ====
| Team | Pld | W | D | L | GF | GA | GR | Pts |
|---|---|---|---|---|---|---|---|---|
| Rangers | 6 | 4 | 0 | 2 | 13 | 7 | 1.857 | 8 |
| Heart of Midlothian | 6 | 3 | 1 | 2 | 10 | 7 | 1.429 | 7 |
| Aberdeen | 6 | 3 | 1 | 2 | 7 | 8 | 0.875 | 7 |
| Clyde | 6 | 1 | 0 | 5 | 5 | 13 | 0.385 | 2 |

=== Scottish Cup ===
| Round | Date | Opponent | H/A | Score | Aberdeen Scorer(s) | Attendance |
|---|---|---|---|---|---|---|
| R1 | 5 February | Hamilton Academical | A | 3–1 | Melrose, Ravn, Winchester | 2,600 |
| R2 | 23 February | Dundee United | H | 5–0 | Petersen (2), Whyte, Ravn, Winchester | 14,000 |
| QF | 5 March | Dumbarton | A | 3–0 | Wilson, Little, Winchester | 10,000 |
| SF | 26 March | Rangers | N | 0–0 | | 49,350 |
| SFR | 29 March | Rangers | N | 1–2 | Melrose | 40,850 |

== Squad ==
=== Appearances & Goals ===
| No. | Pos | Nat | Player | Total | | Division One | | Scottish Cup | | League Cup | |
| No. | Pos | Nat | Player | Apps | Goals | Apps | Goals | Apps | Goals | Apps | Goals |
|---|---|---|---|---|---|---|---|---|---|---|---|
| | GK | (Scotland) SCO | Bobby Clark | 40 | 0 | 33 | 0 | 5 | 0 | 2 | 0 |
| | GK | (Scotland) SCO | John Ogston | 5 | 0 | 1 | 0 | 0 | 0 | 4 | 0 |
| | GK | (Scotland) SCO | Ernie McGarr | 0 | 0 | 0 | 0 | 0 | 0 | 0 | 0 |
| | DF | (Scotland) SCO | Ally Shewan (c) | 45 | 2 | 34 | 2 | 5 | 0 | 6 | 0 |
| | DF | (Scotland) SCO | Tommy McMillan | 41 | 0 | 32 | 0 | 5 | 0 | 4 | 0 |
| | DF | (Scotland) SCO | Jim Whyte | 30 | 3 | 25 | 2 | 5 | 1 | 0 | 0 |
| | DF | (Denmark) DEN | Jens Petersen | 29 | 1 | 23 | 0 | 5 | 1 | 1 | 0 |
| | DF | (Scotland) SCO | Dave Bennett | 17 | 0 | 11 | 0 | 0 | 0 | 6 | 0 |
| | DF | (Scotland) SCO | John McCormick | 7 | 0 | 5 | 0 | 0 | 0 | 2 | 0 |
| | DF | (Scotland) SCO | Hugh Stewart | 1 | 0 | 1 | 0 | 0 | 0 | 0 | 0 |
| | MF | (Scotland) SCO | Jimmy Wilson | 45 | 11 | 34 | 8 | 5 | 1 | 6 | 2 |
| | MF | (Scotland) SCO | Dave Smith | 45 | 3 | 34 | 3 | 5 | 0 | 6 | 0 |
| | MF | (Scotland) SCO | Ian Burns | 8 | 0 | 2 | 0 | 0 | 0 | 6 | 0 |
| | MF | (Denmark) DEN | Leif Mortensen | 2 | 0 | 1 | 0 | 1 | 0 | 0 | 0 |
| | MF | (Scotland) SCO | Tony Fraser | 2 | 0 | 1 | 0 | 0 | 0 | 1 | 0 |
| | MF | (Scotland) SCO | Jimmy Noble | 0 | 0 | 0 | 0 | 0 | 0 | 0 | 0 |
| | MF | (Scotland) SCO | Pat Wilson | 0 | 0 | 0 | 0 | 0 | 0 | 0 | 0 |
| | FW | (Scotland) SCO | Billy Little | 44 | 12 | 34 | 10 | 4 | 1 | 6 | 1 |
| | FW | (Scotland) SCO | Ernie Winchester | 40 | 21 | 30 | 16 | 5 | 4 | 5 | 1 |
| | FW | (Scotland) SCO | Harry Melrose | 33 | 8 | 28 | 6 | 5 | 2 | 0 | 0 |
| | FW | (Denmark) DEN | Jørgen Ravn | 19 | 6 | 13 | 3 | 5 | 2 | 1 | 1 |
| | FW | (Scotland) SCO | Tommy White | 18 | 5 | 14 | 4 | 0 | 0 | 4 | 1 |
| | FW | (Scotland) SCO | George Scott | 7 | 2 | 2 | 1 | 0 | 0 | 5 | 1 |
| | FW | (Scotland) SCO | Jimmy Smith | 7 | 1 | 7 | 1 | 0 | 0 | 0 | 0 |
| | FW | (Scotland) SCO | Dave Millar | 7 | 0 | 6 | 0 | 0 | 0 | 1 | 0 |
| | FW | (Scotland) SCO | Sandy Finnie | 3 | 2 | 3 | 2 | 0 | 0 | 0 | 0 |
