= Ken Brownlee =

Scottish footballer (1934–2022)

Personal information
- Full name: Kenneth Brownlee
- Date of birth: 21 December 1934
- Place of birth: Newtongrange, Scotland
- Date of death: 12 September 2022 (aged 87)
- Place of death: South Africa
- Height: 6 ft 0 in (1.83 m)
- Position: Left-half

Youth career
- 1952–1955: Newtongrange Star

Senior career*
| Years | Team | Apps | (Gls) |
| 1955–1963 | Aberdeen | 132 | (39) |
| 1963–1964 | Third Lanark | 19 | (1) |
| 1964 | St Johnstone | 5 | (1) |
| 1965 | Hellenic | 1 | (0) |
| 1966–1967 | Boksburg | 39 | (13) |
- * Club domestic league appearances and goals

Kenneth Duncan Brownlee (1934 – 12 September 2022) was a Scottish professional footballer who played as a left-half for Aberdeen, Third Lanark and St Johnstone

Brownlee was born in Dalkeith in 1934. He died on 12 September 2022, at the age of 87 in South Africa, due to heart failure.

== Career statistics ==
=== Appearances and goals by club, season and competition ===
| Club | Season | League | | | National Cup | | League Cup | | Europe | | Total | |
| Club | Season | Division | Apps | Goals | Apps | Goals | Apps | Goals | Apps | Goals | Apps | Goals |
|---|---|---|---|---|---|---|---|---|---|---|---|---|
| Aberdeen | 1955–56 | Scottish Division One | 9 | 0 | 1 | 0 | 0 | 0 | 0 | 0 | 10 | 0 |
| Aberdeen | 1956–57 | Scottish Division One | 9 | 0 | 0 | 0 | 2 | 0 | 0 | 0 | 11 | 0 |
| Aberdeen | 1957-58 | Scottish Division One | 28 | 1 | 3 | 0 | 1 | 0 | 0 | 0 | 32 | 1 |
| Aberdeen | 1958-59 | Scottish Division One | 5 | 0 | 1 | 0 | 1 | 0 | 0 | 0 | 7 | 0 |
| Aberdeen | 1959-60 | Scottish Division One | 16 | 4 | 1 | 1 | 5 | 1 | 0 | 0 | 22 | 6 |
| Aberdeen | 1960-61 | Scottish Division One | 29 | 18 | 2 | 4 | 5 | 1 | 0 | 0 | 36 | 23 |
| Aberdeen | 1961-62 | Scottish Division One | 27 | 4 | 2 | 0 | 5 | 2 | 0 | 0 | 34 | 6 |
| Aberdeen | 1962-63 | Scottish Division One | 9 | 1 | 0 | 0 | 5 | 2 | 0 | 0 | 14 | 3 |
| Aberdeen | Total | | 132 | 28 | 10 | 5 | 24 | 6 | 0 | 0 | 166 | 39 |
