= 1959–60 Aberdeen F.C. season =

Aberdeen F.C.
1959–60 season
- Chairman: Charles B. Forbes
- Manager: Davie Shaw (to November); Tommy Pearson (from November)
- Scottish League Division One: 15th
- Scottish Cup: 2nd Round
- Scottish League Cup: Group stage
- Top goalscorer: League: Norman Davidson (11); All: Norman Davidson (19)
- Highest home attendance: 20,000 vs. Rangers, 20 October 1959
- Lowest home attendance: 5,000 vs. Raith Rovers, 2 April 1960
Home colours

The 1959–60 season was Aberdeen's 48th season in the top flight of Scottish football and their 49th season overall. Aberdeen competed in the Scottish League Division One, Scottish League Cup, and the Scottish Cup

== Results ==
Own goals in italics

=== Division 1 ===
| Match Day | Date | Opponent | H/A | Score | Aberdeen Scorer(s) | Attendance |
|---|---|---|---|---|---|---|
| 1 | 19 August | Hibernian | A | 1–2 | Mulhall | 18,000 |
| 2 | 5 September | Dundee | H | 0–3 | | 12,000 |
| 3 | 12 September | Dunfermline Athletic | A | 3–1 | Glen, Little, Mulhall | 7,650 |
| 4 | 19 September | Partick Thistle | H | 5–2 | Baird (2), Clunie (2), Little, | 11,000 |
| 5 | 26 September | Airdrieonians | A | 0–1 | | 7,500 |
| 6 | 3 October | St Mirren | H | 3–1 | Wishart (2), Baird | 10,000 |
| 7 | 10 October | Celtic | A | 1–1 | Baird | 25,000 |
| 8 | 17 October | Kilmarnock | A | 0–2 | | 9,000 |
| 9 | 24 October | Rangers | H | 0–5 | | 20,000 |
| 10 | 31 October | Clyde | A | 2–7 | Kelly, Little | 6,500 |
| 11 | 7 November | Motherwell | A | 1–3 | Baird | 7,000 |
| 12 | 14 November | Third Lanark | H | 3–1 | Clunie (2), Davidson | 8,500 |
| 13 | 21 November | Heart of Midlothian | H | 1–3 | Davidson | 19,000 |
| 14 | 28 November | Raith Rovers | A | 1–5 | Wishart | 5,000 |
| 15 | 5 December | Stirling Albion | H | 3–1 | Little, Clunie, Ewan | 6,000 |
| 16 | 12 December | Arbroath | H | 0–0 | | 8,000 |
| 17 | 19 December | Ayr United | A | 1–2 | Davidson | 5,000 |
| 18 | 26 December | Hibernian | H | 6–4 | Davidson (2), Mulhall, Clunie, Brownlee, Hather | 15,000 |
| 19 | 1 January | Dundee | A | 1–4 | Davidson | 15,500 |
| 20 | 2 January | Dunfermline Athletic | H | 1–1 | Davidson | 12,000 |
| 21 | 9 January | Partick Thistle | A | 0–1 | | 7,000 |
| 22 | 16 January | Airdrieonians | H | 2–2 | Hather, Clunie | 8,500 |
| 23 | 23 January | St Mirren | A | 0–3 | | 5,500 |
| 24 | 6 February | Celtic | H | 3–2 | Kinnell, Davidson, Brownlee | 14,000 |
| 25 | 1 March | Rangers | A | 2–2 | Wishart, Davidson | 20,000 |
| 26 | 8 March | Clyde | H | 0–2 | | 13,000 |
| 27 | 12 March | Motherwell | H | 2–2 | Cummings, Little | 11,000 |
| 28 | 19 March | Third Lanark | A | 1–2 | Cummings | 5,000 |
| 29 | 22 March | Kilmarnock | H | 0–1 | | 13,000 |
| 30 | 26 March | Heart of Midlothian | A | 0–3 | | 15,000 |
| 31 | 2 April | Raith Rovers | H | 4–2 | Little (2), Brownlee, Glen | 5,000 |
| 32 | 16 April | Stirling Albion | A | 2–0 | Mulhall (2) | 8,185 |
| 33 | 23 April | Arbroath | A | 3–1 | Davidson (2), Little | 4,000 |
| 34 | 30 April | Ayr United | H | 2–0 | Little, Brownlee | 8,000 |

==== Final standings ====
| Pos | Team | Pld | W | D | L | GF | GA | GR | Pts | Qualification or relegation |
|---|---|---|---|---|---|---|---|---|---|---|
| 13 | Dunfermline Athletic | 34 | 10 | 9 | 15 | 72 | 80 | 0.900 | 29 | |
| 14 | St Mirren | 34 | 11 | 6 | 17 | 78 | 86 | 0.907 | 28 | |
| 15 | Aberdeen | 34 | 11 | 6 | 17 | 54 | 72 | 0.750 | 28 | |
| 16 | Airdrieonians | 34 | 11 | 6 | 17 | 56 | 80 | 0.700 | 28 | |
| 17 | Stirling Albion (R) | 34 | 7 | 8 | 19 | 55 | 72 | 0.764 | 22 | Relegated to the Second Division |

Source: RSSSF
(R) Relegated

=== Scottish League Cup ===
==== Group 3 ====
| Round | Date | Opponent | H/A | Score | Aberdeen Scorer(s) | Attendance |
|---|---|---|---|---|---|---|
| 1 | 8 August | Stirling Albion | H | 3–1 | Brownlee, Ewan, Mulhall Davidson | 18,000 |
| 2 | 12 August | Heart of Midlothian | A | 2–2 | Wishart, Baird | 25,000 |
| 3 | 15 August | Kilmarnock | A | 3–2 | Mulhall, Wishart, Ewan | 9,000 |
| 4 | 22 August | Stirling Albion | A | 5–2 | Davidson (2), McKenzie, Glen, Ewan | 9,000 |
| 5 | 26 August | Heart of Midlothian | H | 1–4 | Glen | 31,000 |
| 6 | 29 August | Kilmarnock | H | 2–4 | Ewan, own goal | 8,500 |

==== Group 3 final table ====
| Team | Pld | W | D | L | GF | GA | GR | Pts |
|---|---|---|---|---|---|---|---|---|
| Heart of Midlothian | 6 | 4 | 2 | 0 | 16 | 6 | 2.667 | 10 |
| Aberdeen | 6 | 3 | 1 | 2 | 16 | 15 | 1.067 | 7 |
| Kilmarnock | 6 | 2 | 1 | 3 | 13 | 13 | 1.000 | 5 |
| Stirling Albion | 6 | 0 | 2 | 4 | 8 | 19 | 0.421 | 2 |

=== Scottish Cup ===
| Round | Date | Opponent | H/A | Score | Aberdeen Scorer(s) | Attendance |
|---|---|---|---|---|---|---|
| R1 | 30 January | Brechin City | H | 0–0 | | 12,000 |
| R1R | 3 February | Brechin City | A | 6–3 | Davidson (5), Brownlee | 4,300 |
| R2 | 13 February | Clyde | H | 0–2 | | 13,000 |

== Squad ==
=== Appearances & Goals ===
| No. | Pos | Nat | Player | Total | | Division One | | Scottish Cup | | League Cup | |
| No. | Pos | Nat | Player | Apps | Goals | Apps | Goals | Apps | Goals | Apps | Goals |
|---|---|---|---|---|---|---|---|---|---|---|---|
| | GK | (Scotland) SCO | John Ogston | 20 | 0 | 16 | 0 | 1 | 0 | 3 | 0 |
| | GK | (England) ENG | Chris Harker | 14 | 0 | 12 | 0 | 2 | 0 | 0 | 0 |
| | GK | (Scotland) SCO | Fred Martin | 4 | 0 | 2 | 0 | 0 | 0 | 2 | 0 |
| | GK | (Scotland) SCO | John McBride | 2 | 0 | 2 | 0 | 0 | 0 | 0 | 0 |
| | GK | (Scotland) SCO | John Yule | 1 | 0 | 1 | 0 | 0 | 0 | 0 | 0 |
| | GK | ?? | John Low | 1 | 0 | 0 | 0 | 0 | 0 | 1 | 0 |
| | GK | ?? | Bobby Russell | 1 | 0 | 1 | 0 | 0 | 0 | 0 | 0 |
| | DF | (Scotland) SCO | Jimmy Hogg | 43 | 0 | 34 | 0 | 3 | 0 | 6 | 0 |
| | DF | (Scotland) SCO | Jim Clunie | 34 | 7 | 26 | 7 | 3 | 0 | 5 | 0 |
| | DF | (Scotland) SCO | George Kinnell | 24 | 1 | 21 | 1 | 3 | 0 | 0 | 0 |
| | DF | (Scotland) SCO | Dave Caldwell | 12 | 0 | 6 | 0 | 0 | 0 | 6 | 0 |
| | DF | (Scotland) SCO | Andy Cadenhead | 11 | 0 | 9 | 0 | 2 | 0 | 0 | 0 |
| | DF | ?? | Gordon Sim | 7 | 0 | 7 | 0 | 0 | 0 | 0 | 0 |
| | DF | (Scotland) SCO | Doug Coutts | 5 | 0 | 5 | 0 | 0 | 0 | 0 | 0 |
| | DF | (Scotland) SCO | George Sang | 3 | 0 | 3 | 0 | 0 | 0 | 0 | 0 |
| | DF | (Scotland) SCO | John McConnachie | 3 | 0 | 2 | 0 | 0 | 0 | 1 | 0 |
| | DF | (Scotland) SCO | Willie Clydedale | 2 | 0 | 1 | 0 | 1 | 0 | 0 | 0 |
| | DF | (Scotland) SCO | Doug Fraser | 1 | 0 | 1 | 0 | 0 | 0 | 0 | 0 |
| | MF | (Scotland) SCO | George Mulhall | 36 | 7 | 27 | 5 | 3 | 0 | 6 | 2 |
| | MF | (Scotland) SCO | Bob Wishart | 32 | 6 | 24 | 4 | 2 | 0 | 6 | 2 |
| | MF | (Scotland) SCO | Ian Burns | 26 | 0 | 22 | 0 | 2 | 0 | 2 | 0 |
| | MF | (Scotland) SCO | Ken Brownlee | 22 | 6 | 16 | 4 | 1 | 1 | 5 | 1 |
| | MF | (Scotland) SCO | Archie Glen (c) | 19 | 4 | 14 | 2 | 0 | 0 | 5 | 2 |
| | MF | (Scotland) SCO | Dickie Ewen | 17 | 6 | 11 | 1 | 0 | 0 | 6 | 5 |
| | MF | (Scotland) SCO | John McCall | 1 | 0 | 1 | 0 | 0 | 0 | 0 | 0 |
| | MF | (Scotland) SCO | Alistair Patience | 0 | 0 | 0 | 0 | 0 | 0 | 0 | 0 |
| | FW | (Scotland) SCO | Billy Little | 36 | 9 | 30 | 9 | 3 | 0 | 3 | 0 |
| | FW | (Scotland) SCO | Hugh Baird | 36 | 6 | 28 | 5 | 3 | 0 | 5 | 1 |
| | FW | (Scotland) SCO | Norman Davidson | 28 | 17 | 23 | 11 | 3 | 5 | 2 | 1 |
| | FW | (England) ENG | Jack Hather | 16 | 2 | 15 | 2 | 1 | 0 | 0 | 0 |
| | FW | (Scotland) SCO | Bernie Kelly | 4 | 1 | 4 | 1 | 0 | 0 | 0 | 0 |
| | FW | (England) ENG | Bobby Cummings | 6 | 2 | 6 | 2 | 0 | 0 | 0 | 0 |
| | FW | (Scotland) SCO | Billy McKenzie | 4 | 1 | 2 | 0 | 0 | 0 | 2 | 1 |
| | FW | (Scotland) SCO | Jim Hosie | 2 | 0 | 2 | 0 | 0 | 0 | 0 | 0 |
