= Bobby Cummings =

English footballer (1935–2008)

Personal information
- Full name: Robert Douglas Cummings
- Date of birth: 17 November 1935
- Place of birth: Ashington, England
- Date of death: 26 August 2008 (aged 72)
- Place of death: Blyth, England
- Height: 5 ft 9 1/2 in (1.77 m)
- Position: Centre forward

Youth career
- New Hartley Juniors

Senior career*
Years	Team	Apps	(Gls)
1954–1956	Newcastle United	0	(0)
1956–1960	Ashington		
1960–1963	Aberdeen	63	(33)
1963–1965	Newcastle United	44	(14)
1965–1968	Darlington	74	(43)
1968–1969	Hartlepools United	52	(12)
1969–	Port Elizabeth City		
- * Club domestic league appearances and goals

Robert Douglas Cummings (17 November 1935 – 26 August 2008) was an English professional footballer who scored 33 goals from 63 appearances in the Scottish League for Aberdeen and 69 goals from 170 appearances in the Football League playing for Newcastle United, Darlington and Hartlepools United. He played as a centre forward or outside right. He also played in the South African National Football League for Port Elizabeth City.

== Career ==
Cummings was born in Ashington, Northumberland, in 1935. He began his football career as a youngster with Newcastle United but was released before reaching the first team and signed for Ashington. The club record he set of 60 goals in 1958–59, as Ashington finished second to Peterborough United in the Midland League, still stands, and his goalscoring earned him a move to Aberdeen.

Cummings first joined Aberdeen on a part-time basis, continuing to work as a coal miner at Bates Colliery, at Blyth, Northumberland, to ensure his exemption from National Service. He made his Scottish League debut on 1 March 1960 against Rangers and a year later, playing at outside right, he became only the third Aberdeen player, and first Englishman, to score a hat-trick against that club. In the 1962–63 season, he scored 23 goals in all competitions, and ended his Aberdeen career in October 1963 with 47 goals from 87 games in all competitions. In October 1963, Cummings played as a guest and scored for a Newcastle United XI in a testimonial match for Alf McMichael, and five days later he signed for the club for a £5,000 fee.

He stayed with Newcastle for two seasons, scoring 14 goals from 44 games. In the 1964–65 season, he was second in the club's scoring charts, with 8 goals behind Ron McGarry's 16, and made a significant contribution to their promotion to the First Division. He played little in the top flight, and in October 1965, dropped down to the Fourth Division to become Darlington's £6,000 record signing.

Cummings scored twice on his Darlington debut, in a 3–0 defeat of Stockport County, and went on to become the club's top scorer for the 1965–66 season as they gained promotion for the first time in more than 40 years. In two-and-a-half seasons he scored 46 goals, but by early 1968 he was not being selected regularly, and was persuaded to return to Division Four with nearby Hartlepools United for a £1,000 fee. His 9 goals from 18 games helped Hartlepools to third place, and consequent promotion to the Third Division. He played regularly at the higher level, but scored only three times, and then went to South Africa to play in the National Football League for Port Elizabeth City.

On his return from South Africa he settled back in his native north-east of England, where he collapsed and died in August 2008 at the age of 72.

== Career statistics ==
Appearances and goals by club, season and competition
Club	Season	League			National cup (Note: Includes FA Cup, Scottish Cup)		League cup (Note: Includes Football League Cup, Scottish League Cup)		Total	
Club	Season	Division	Apps	Goals	Apps	Goals	Apps	Goals	Apps	Goals
Newcastle United	1954–55	First Division	0	0	0	0	—		0	0
Newcastle United	1955–56	First Division	0	0	0	0	—		0	0
Newcastle United	Total		0	0	0	0	—		0	0
Aberdeen	1959–60	Scottish Division One	6	2	0	0	0	0	6	2
Aberdeen	1960–61	Scottish Division One	6	6	0	0	1	0	7	6
Aberdeen	1961–62	Scottish Division One	15	6	4	7	6	2	25	15
Aberdeen	1962–63	Scottish Division One	31	18	3	4	4	1	38	23
Aberdeen	1963–64	Scottish Division One	5	1	0	0	6	2	11	3
Aberdeen	Total		63	33	7	11	17	5	87	49
Newcastle United	1963–64	Second Division	16	5	0	0	0	0	16	5
Newcastle United	1964–65	Second Division	24	8	0	0	1	0	25	8
Newcastle United	1965–66	First Division	4	1	0	0	0	0	4	1
Newcastle United	Total		44	14	0	0	1	0	45	14
Darlington	1965–66	Fourth Division	37	23	2	1	1	0	40	24
Darlington	1966–67	Third Division	15	8	0	0	4	1	19	9
Darlington	1967–68	Fourth Division	22	12	1	0	2	1	25	13
Darlington	Total		74	43	3	1	7	2	84	46
Hartlepools United	1967–68	Fourth Division	18	9	0	0	0	0	18	9
Hartlepool (Note: Club name changed from Hartlepools United to Hartlepool in 1968.)	1968–69	Third Division	34	3	1	0	1	0	36	3
Hartlepool	Total		52	12	1	0	1	0	54	12
Career total			233	102	11	12	26	7	270	121
