= Dickie Ewen =

Scottish footballer (born 1937)

Personal information
- Full name: Richard Ewen
- Date of birth: 24 August 1937
- Place of birth: Aberdeen, Scotland
- Date of death: 9 March 2001 (aged 63)
- Place of death: Aberdeen, Scotland
- Height: 5 ft 8 in (1.73 m)
- Position: Outside right

Youth career
- –1957: Banks O' Dee

Senior career*
| Years | Team | Apps | (Gls) |
| 1957–1962 | Aberdeen | 82 | (18) |
| 1962–1964 | Forfar Athletic | 23 | (3) |
| Total | | 105 | (21) |

International career
| 1958 | Scotland U23 | 1 | (0) |
- * Club domestic league appearances and goals

Richard "Dickie" Ewen (born 24 August 1937) was a Scottish former professional footballer, who played for Aberdeen FC, Forfar Athletic FC, and subsequently for several Highland Football League Clubs.

Ewen began his professional career in 1957 when he joined Aberdeen from local club Banks O' Dee. He made over 100 appearances for Aberdeen before joining Forfar Athletic in 1962. Upon leaving Forfar, he signed for Highland Football League Club Peterhead FC, followed by both Keith FC, and Rothes FC, also both Highland League Clubs.

Ewen won a Scottish Cup runners-up medal in 1959 when he played in Aberdeen's 3–1 defeat to St Mirren.

== Career statistics ==
Appearances and goals by club, season and competition
| Club | Season | League | | | Scottish Cup | | League Cup | | Europe | | Total | |
| Club | Season | Division | Apps | Goals | Apps | Goals | Apps | Goals | Apps | Goals | Apps | Goals |
|---|---|---|---|---|---|---|---|---|---|---|---|---|
| Aberdeen | 1957–58 | Scottish Division One | 23 | 7 | 2 | 0 | 0 | 0 | 0 | 0 | 25 | 7 |
| Aberdeen | 1958–59 | Scottish Division One | 26 | 8 | 5 | 0 | 5 | 0 | 0 | 0 | 36 | 8 |
| Aberdeen | 1959–60 | Scottish Division One | 11 | 1 | 0 | 0 | 6 | 5 | 0 | 0 | 17 | 6 |
| Aberdeen | 1960–61 | Scottish Division One | 18 | 0 | 2 | 1 | 0 | 0 | 0 | 0 | 20 | 1 |
| Aberdeen | 1961–62 | Scottish Division One | 4 | 2 | 4 | 0 | 0 | 0 | 0 | 0 | 8 | 2 |
| Aberdeen | Total | | 82 | 18 | 13 | 1 | 11 | 5 | 0 | 0 | 106 | 24 |
| Forfar Athletic | 1962–63 | Scottish Second Division | 1 | 0 | 0 | 0 | 0 | 0 | – | – | 1 | 0 |
| Forfar Athletic | 1963–64 | Scottish Second Division | 22 | 3 | 2 | 0 | 4 | 2 | – | – | 28 | 5 |
| Forfar Athletic | Total | | 23 | 3 | 2 | 0 | 4 | 2 | - | - | 29 | 5 |
| Career total | | | 105 | 21 | 15 | 1 | 15 | 7 | 0 | 0 | 135 | 29 |
