= Ally Shewan =

Scottish footballer (1940–2024)

Personal information
- Full name: Alister John Shewan
- Date of birth: 5 August 1940
- Place of birth: Turriff, Scotland
- Date of death: 29 January 2024 (aged 83)
- Place of death: Portlethen, Scotland
- Position: Left-back

Senior career*
Years	Team	Apps	(Gls)
1960–1969	Aberdeen	222	(8)
- Elgin City

Managerial career
- Elgin City
- * Club domestic league appearances and goals

Alister Shewan (5 August 1940 – 29 January 2024) was a Scottish footballer who played as a left-back. He joined Aberdeen, his only club at the professional level, in 1960, and was almost ever-present from 1963 until his departure in 1969. He was on the losing side in the 1967 Scottish Cup Final.

In the summer of 1967, Aberdeen came to America, playing as the Washington Whips in the fledgling United Soccer Association. The Whips won the Eastern Division and met the Los Angeles Wolves (actually the Wolverhampton Wanderers) in the championship game. In the 122nd minute of extra time with the match tied 5–5, Shewan scored an own goal, giving Los Angeles a 6–5 win and the title.

After leaving Aberdeen, Shewan spent time in Australia then played for, and later managed, Elgin City, when they played in the Highland Football League. Shewan, described as a "no-nonsense left-back", is a member of Aberdeen Football Club's Hall of Fame, inducted in 2004.

Shewan died on 29 January 2024, at the age of 83.

== Career statistics ==
=== Club ===
Appearances and goals by club, season and competition
Club	Season	League			Scottish Cup		League Cup		Europe		Total	
Club	Season	Division	Apps	Goals	Apps	Goals	Apps	Goals	Apps	Goals	Apps	Goals
Aberdeen	1961–62	Scottish Division One	7	0	0	0	0	0	0	0	7	0
Aberdeen	1962–63	Scottish Division One	12	0	0	0	6	0	0	0	18	0
Aberdeen	1963–64	Scottish Division One	31	0	4	0	6	0	0	0	41	0
Aberdeen	1964–65	Scottish Division One	34	0	2	0	6	0	0	0	42	0
Aberdeen	1965–66	Scottish Division One	34	2	5	0	6	0	0	0	45	2
Aberdeen	1966–67	Scottish Division One	34	1	6	0	10	1	0	0	50	2
Aberdeen	1967–68	Scottish Division One	34	3	3	0	6	0	4	0	47	3
Aberdeen	1968–69	Scottish Division One	34	2	6	0	6	0	4	0	50	2
Career total			220	8	26	0	46	1	8	0	300	9
