= George Mulhall =

Scottish footballer and manager

Personal information
- Date of birth: 8 May 1936
- Place of birth: Falkirk, Scotland
- Date of death: 27 April 2018 (aged 81)
- Place of death: Brighouse, England
- Position: Outside left

Youth career
- Denny YMCA
- Kilsyth Rangers

Senior career*
| Years | Team | Apps | (Gls) |
| 1953–1962 | Aberdeen | 110 | (30) |
| 1962–1969 | Sunderland | 253 | (56) |
| 1967 | → Vancouver Royal Canadians (loan) | 10 | (3) |
| 1969–1971 | Cape Town City | 41 | (22) |
| 1971–1972 | Morton | 1 | (0) |
| Total | | 415 | (111) |

International career
| 1959–1963 | Scotland | 3 | (1) |
| 1959–1961 | Scottish League XI | 3 | (0) |

Managerial career
- 1972–1974: Halifax Town
- 1978–1981: Bradford City
- 1981–1982: Bolton Wanderers
- 1996: Halifax Town
- 1997–1998: Halifax Town
- * Club domestic league appearances and goals

George Mulhall (8 May 1936 – 27 April 2018) was a Scottish football player and manager. Born in Falkirk, Mulhall played as an outside left for Aberdeen and Sunderland. He was capped three times for Scotland. He became the manager of Bradford City, Bolton Wanderers and Halifax Town.

== Playing career ==
Two of Mulhall's elder brothers had forged professional careers; Martin with Falkirk, Albion Rovers and Cowdenbeath, and Edward with East Stirlingshire. George, who signed for Aberdeen on his 17th birthday, had played at Denny YMCA and Kilsyth Rangers before moving to Pittodrie.

Mulhall initially had difficulty breaking into the Aberdeen first team, as his left wing position was occupied by Jackie Hather. He made his first team debut on the opening day of the 1955–56 season, while Hather was recovering from injury, but he did not become a regular in the side until 1959.

Mulhall earned his first international cap in October 1959, when he scored in a 4–0 win over Northern Ireland. He played in 150 games for Aberdeen, scoring 42 goals.

In September 1962 he signed for Sunderland for £23,000. Mulhall made 289 appearances and scored 67 goals for Sunderland, and he helped the team to win promotion to the First Division in 1963–64. Mulhall was ever-present that season, as part of a run of 114 consecutive appearances. He won another two international caps, also against Northern Ireland, before moving to South Africa to play for Cape Town City in 1969. He stayed for three seasons before playing one final game for Morton.

== Managerial career ==
Mulhall moved into coaching upon his playing retirement first becoming trainer-coach at Halifax Town. He was promoted to first team manager in 1972, and held this position until September 1974. A month later he moved to Bolton Wanderers where he spent four years as coach and assistant manager.

In November 1978 he moved to Bradford City to replace John Napier as manager. In his first full season he guided the club to 5th in Division Four before he was tempted back to Bolton in March 1981. He managed Bolton for one year until he was sacked. He served as a scout at Ipswich Town and assistant manager at Tranmere Rovers. He later returned to Halifax Town as joint manager with Kieran O'Regan and got them promoted back into the Football League in 1998, at which point Mulhall retired.

Mulhall died on 27 April 2018, aged 81.

== Career statistics ==
=== Club ===
Appearances and goals by club, season and competition
| Club | Season | League | | | National Cup | | League Cup | | Total | |
| Club | Season | Division | Apps | Goals | Apps | Goals | Apps | Goals | Apps | Goals |
|---|---|---|---|---|---|---|---|---|---|---|
| Aberdeen | 1955–56 | Scottish Division One | 7 | 3 | 0 | 0 | 5 | 1 | 12 | 4 |
| Aberdeen | 1956–57 | Scottish Division One | 2 | 1 | 0 | 0 | 0 | 0 | 2 | 1 |
| Aberdeen | 1957–58 | Scottish Division One | 4 | 1 | 0 | 0 | 1 | 0 | 5 | 1 |
| Aberdeen | 1958–59 | Scottish Division One | 4 | 1 | 0 | 0 | 1 | 2 | 5 | 3 |
| Aberdeen | 1959–60 | Scottish Division One | 27 | 5 | 3 | 0 | 6 | 2 | 36 | 7 |
| Aberdeen | 1960–61 | Scottish Division One | 32 | 10 | 2 | 0 | 6 | 2 | 40 | 12 |
| Aberdeen | 1961–62 | Scottish Division One | 32 | 9 | 4 | 2 | 6 | 0 | 42 | 11 |
| Aberdeen | 1962–63 | Scottish Division One | 2 | 0 | 0 | 0 | 6 | 3 | 8 | 3 |
| Aberdeen | Total | | 110 | 30 | 9 | 2 | 31 | 10 | 150 | 42 |
| Sunderland | 1962–63 | Second Division | 35 | 7 | 4 | 2 | 6 | 2 | 45 | 11 |
| Sunderland | 1963–64 | Second Division | 42 | 9 | 6 | 1 | 1 | 0 | 49 | 10 |
| Sunderland | 1964–65 | First Division | 41 | 9 | 2 | 1 | 3 | 1 | 46 | 11 |
| Sunderland | 1965–66 | First Division | 36 | 8 | 1 | 0 | 1 | 1 | 38 | 9 |
| Sunderland | 1966–67 | First Division | 33 | 12 | 5 | 1 | 2 | 1 | 40 | 14 |
| Sunderland | 1967–68 | First Division | 35 | 4 | 1 | 0 | 3 | 1 | 39 | 5 |
| Sunderland | 1968–69 | First Division | 31 | 7 | 0 | 0 | 1 | 0 | 32 | 7 |
| Sunderland | Total | | 253 | 56 | 19 | 5 | 17 | 6 | 289 | 67 |
| Vancouver Royal Canadians (loan) | 1967 | United Soccer Association | 10 | 3 | 0 | 0 | 0 | 0 | 10 | 3 |
| Cape Town City | 1969 | NFL (South Africa) | - | - | - | - | - | - | - | - |
| Cape Town City | 1970 | NFL (South Africa) | - | - | - | - | - | - | - | - |
| Cape Town City | 1971 | NFL (South Africa) | - | - | - | - | - | - | - | - |
| Cape Town City | Total | | 41 | 22 | - | - | - | - | 41+ | 22+ |
| Greenock Morton | 1971–72 | Scottish Division One | 1 | 0 | 0 | 0 | 1 | 0 | 2 | 0 |
| Career total | | | 415 | 111 | 28+ | 7+ | 49+ | 16+ | 492+ | 134+ |

=== International ===
Appearances and goals by national team and year
| National team | Year | Apps | Goals |
|---|---|---|---|
| Scotland | 1959 | 1 | 1 |
| Scotland | 1960 | — | |
| Scotland | 1961 | — | |
| Scotland | 1962 | 1 | 0 |
| Scotland | 1963 | 1 | 0 |
| Total | | 3 | 1 |

Scores and results list Scotland's goal tally first, score column indicates score after each Mulhall goal

List of international goals scored by George Mulhall
| No. | Date | Venue | Opponent | Score | Result | Competition |
|---|---|---|---|---|---|---|
| 1 | 3 October 1959 | Windsor Park, Belfast, Northern Ireland | Northern Ireland | 0-4 | 0-4 | 1959-60 British Home Championship |

=== Managerial record ===
| Team | From | To | Record | | | | |
| Team | From | To | P | W | L | D | Win % |
|---|---|---|---|---|---|---|---|
| Halifax Town | 1972 | 1974 | - | - | - | - | - |
| Bradford City | 1978 | 1981 | 115 | 48 | 34 | 33 | 41.74% |
| Bolton Wanderers | 1981 | 1982 | 42 | 13 | 22 | 7 | 30.95% |
| Halifax Town | 1996 | 1998 | - | - | - | - | - |
| Total | | | 157+ | 61+ | 56+ | 40+ | 36.35% |
