= Dave Smith (footballer, born 1943) =

Scottish footballer and manager

Personal information
- Full name: David Bruce Smith
- Date of birth: 14 November 1943 (age 82)
- Place of birth: Aberdeen, Scotland
- Position: Midfielder

Senior career*
Years	Team	Apps	(Gls)
1961–1966	Aberdeen	133	(8)
1966–1974	Rangers	195	(8)
1974–1975	Arbroath	20	(0)
1975–1976	Arcadia Shepherds F.C.		
1976	Seattle Sounders	5	(0)
1976	Los Angeles Aztecs	15	(0)
1976–1980	Berwick Rangers	157	(11)
1980–1981	Meadowbank Thistle	11	(0)
1981	Hamilton Academical	6	(0)
1981–198?	Huntly		
Total		542	(27)

International career
1966–1968	Scotland	2	(0)
1966–1970	Scottish League XI	4	(0)

Managerial career
- 1976–1980: Berwick Rangers
- 1981–198?: Huntly
- 1982–1983: Peterhead
- Gala Fairydean
- Whitehill Welfare
- * Club domestic league appearances and goals

David Bruce Smith (born 14 November 1943) is a Scottish former professional football player and manager.

== Playing career ==
Primarily a left sided midfielder, Smith started his playing career for Aberdeen and moved to Rangers in August 1966 for a fee of £50,000. During his time at Ibrox, he made 303 appearances winning the Scottish League Cup in 1971, the Scottish Cup in 1973 and, most notably, the UEFA Cup Winners' Cup in 1972. That year, he was voted the Scottish Football Writers' Association's Player of the year.

During his career he collected two Scotland caps, featuring twice in Friendly matches against the Netherlands

== Coaching career ==
Smith left Ibrox in November 1974 for Arbroath, where he took up a player-coach role. He went on to become a player-manager at Berwick Rangers in 1976 and, while there, he transformed the club's fortunes, guiding them to the Scottish Second Division championship in 1979. He left Berwick in 1980 and subsequently managed Huntly, Gala Fairydean and Whitehill Welfare.

Smith spent one close season during his career playing for the Seattle Sounders and the Los Angeles Aztecs in the NASL and is also known to have played in South Africa.

== Personal life ==
Smith had two brothers who were also professional footballers: Doug, who spent his entire career with Dundee United, and Hugh, who played for Forfar Athletic and Morton.

== Career statistics ==
=== Club ===
Appearances and goals by club, season and competition
Club	Season	League			National Cup		League Cup		Europe		Total	
Club	Season	Division	Apps	Goals	Apps	Goals	Apps	Goals	Apps	Goals	Apps	Goals
Aberdeen	1961–62	Scottish Division One	2	0	0	0	0	0	0	0	2	0
Aberdeen	1962–63	Scottish Division One	31	3	3	0	1	0	0	0	35	3
Aberdeen	1963–64	Scottish Division One	33	2	4	1	6	0	0	0	43	3
Aberdeen	1964–65	Scottish Division One	33	0	2	0	6	4	0	0	41	4
Aberdeen	1965–66	Scottish Division One	34	3	5	0	6	0	0	0	45	3
Aberdeen	1966–67	Scottish Division One	0	0	0	0	0	0	0	0	0	0
Aberdeen	Total		133	8	14	1	19	4	0	0	166	13
Rangers	1966–67	Scottish Division One	34	2	1	0	11	0	9	2	55	4
Rangers	1967–68	Scottish Division One	34	2	5	0	6	0	6	0	51	2
Rangers	1968–69	Scottish Division One	23	2	5	0	4	0	9	1	41	3
Rangers	1969–70	Scottish Division One	25	0	3	0	5	0	2	0	35	0
Rangers	1970–71	Scottish Division One	11	0	3	0	1	0	0	0	15	0
Rangers	1971–72	Scottish Division One	30	1	7	0	0	0	7	0	44	1
Rangers	1972–73	Scottish Division One	29	0	5	0	9	1	0	0	43	1
Rangers	1973–74	Scottish Division One	9	1	1	0	6	1	1	0	17	2
Rangers	Total		195	8	30	0	42	2	34	3	301	13
Arbroath	1974–75	Scottish Division One	20	0	4	0	0	0	0	0	24	0
Arcadia Shepherds	1975–76	NFL	-	-	-	-	-	-	-	-	-	-
Seattle Sounders	1976	NASL	5	0	0	0	0	0	0	0	5	0
Los Angeles Aztecs	1976	NASL	15	0	0	0	0	0	0	0	15	0
Berwick Rangers	1976–77	Scottish Second Division	-	-	-	-	-	-	-	-	-	-
Berwick Rangers	1977–78	Scottish Second Division	-	-	-	-	-	-	-	-	-	-
Berwick Rangers	1978–79	Scottish Second Division	-	-	-	-	-	-	-	-	-	-
Berwick Rangers	1979–80	Scottish First Division	-	-	-	-	-	-	-	-	-	-
Berwick Rangers	1980–81	Scottish First Division	-	-	-	-	-	-	-	-	-	-
Berwick Rangers	Total		157	11	-	-	-	-	-	-	157+	11+
Meadowbank Thistle	1980–81	Scottish Second Division	11	0	-	-	-	-	-	-	11+	0+
Hamilton Academical	1980–81	Scottish First Division	6	0	-	-	-	-	-	-	6+	0+
Career total			542+	27+	48+	1+	61+	6+	34	3	685+	37+

=== International ===
Appearances and goals by national team and year
National team	Year	Apps	Goals
Scotland	1966	1	0
Scotland	1967	—	
Scotland	1968	1	0
Total		2	0

=== Managerial record ===
Team	From	To	Record				
Team	From	To	P	W	L	D	Win %
Berwick Rangers	1976	1980	180	68	58	54	37.78%
