= Doug Fraser (Scottish footballer) =

Scottish footballer and manager (born 1941)

Personal information
- Full name: Douglas Michael Fraser
- Date of birth: 8 December 1941 (age 84)
- Place of birth: Aberdeen, Scotland
- Height: 5 ft 9 in (1.75 m)
- Position: Full back

Senior career*
Years	Team	Apps	(Gls)
1960–1963	Aberdeen	64	(1)
1963–1971	West Bromwich Albion	257	(8)
1971–1973	Nottingham Forest	85	(3)
1973–1974	Walsall	27	(0)
Total		433	(11)

International career
1967–1968	Scotland	7	(0)

Managerial career
- 1974–1977: Walsall
- * Club domestic league appearances and goals

Douglas Michael Fraser (born 8 December 1941) is a Scottish former football full-back.

== Career ==
Fraser began his career in Scottish minor football, appearing for Eaglesham Amateur and Blantyre Celtic. After being rejected by both Celtic and Leeds United, following trials Fraser turned professional with Aberdeen. Fraser's form attracted the attentions of English clubs and in September 1963 West Bromwich Albion manager Jimmy Hagan paid £23,000 for his signature. Making his debut against Birmingham City that same month, Fraser initially played in a number of defensive and midfield positions before making the right back slot his own. Fraser played in four cup finals during his time at The Hawthorns. His final Albion game was a 2–2 draw against Chelsea in November 1970 before manager Alan Ashman sold him to Nottingham Forest for £35,000. He would later play for Walsall where he hit the headlines after he was red carded for fighting with Bristol Rovers' Kenny Stephens - a former Albion teammate.

During his time with West Brom, Fraser made seven appearances for the Scotland national team. He made two appearances in 1968, against Cyprus and the Netherlands. The other five appearances were during a 1967 overseas tour that the Scottish Football Association decided in October 2021 to reclassify as full internationals, which increased Fraser's cap tally from two to seven.

After his retirement from playing Fraser was appointed manager at Walsall, a position he held until 1977. Following this Fraser left football and took up a position as a prison guard at Nottingham Gaol.

== Career statistics ==
=== Club ===
Appearances and goals by club, season and competition
Club	Seasons	League			National Cup		League Cup		Europe		Other		Total	
Club	Seasons	Division	Apps	Goals	Apps	Goals	Apps	Goals	Apps	Goals	Apps	Goals	Apps	Goals
Aberdeen	1959–60	Scottish Division One	1	0	0	0	0	0	0	0	-	-	1	0
Aberdeen	1960–61	Scottish Division One	24	0	1	0	0	0	0	0	-	-	25	0
Aberdeen	1961–62	Scottish Division One	28	0	5	1	6	0	0	0	-	-	39	1
Aberdeen	1962–63	Scottish Division One	8	0	0	0	5	0	0	0	-	-	13	0
Aberdeen	1963–64	Scottish Division One	3	1	0	0	6	0	0	0	-	-	9	1
Aberdeen	Total		64	1	6	1	17	0	0	0	-	-	87	2
West Bromwich Albion	1963–64	First Division	33	1	4	0	0	0	0	0	-	-	37	1
West Bromwich Albion	1964–65	First Division	33	0	1	0	0	0	0	0	-	-	34	0
West Bromwich Albion	1965–66	First Division	42	1	1	0	9	2	0	0	-	-	52	3
West Bromwich Albion	1966–67	First Division	35	4	2	0	7	2	4	0	-	-	48	6
West Bromwich Albion	1967–68	First Division	40	1	10	0	1	0	0	0	-	-	51	1
West Bromwich Albion	1968–69	First Division	34	1	5	0	2	0	6	0	1	0	48	1
West Bromwich Albion	1969–70	First Division	34	0	1	0	9	0	0	0	-	-	44	0
West Bromwich Albion	1970–71	First Division	6	0	0	0	1	0	0	0	-	-	7	0
West Bromwich Albion	Total		257	8	24	0	29	4	10	0	1	0	321	12
Nottingham Forest	1970–71	First Division	19	0	-	-	-	-	-	-	-	-	19+	0+
Nottingham Forest	1971–72	First Division	36	0	-	-	-	-	-	-	-	-	36+	0+
Nottingham Forest	1972–73	Second Division	30	3	-	-	-	-	-	-	-	-	30+	3+
Nottingham Forest	Total		85	3	-	-	-	-	-	-	-	-	85+	3+
Walsall	1973–74	Third Division	27	0	-	-	-	-	-	-	-	-	27+	0+
Career total			433	12	30+	1+	46+	4+	10	0	1	0	520+	17+

=== International ===
Appearances and goals by national team and year
National team	Year	Apps	Goals
Scotland	1967	5	0
Scotland	1968	2	0
Total		7	0

=== Managerial record ===
Team	From	To	Record				
Team	From	To	P	W	L	D	Win %
Walsall	1 January 1974	7 March 1977	163	60	58	45	36.8%

== Honours ==
West Bromwich Albion

- FA Cup: 1967–68
- Football League Cup: 1965–66; runner-up: 1966–67, 1969–70

== See also ==
- List of Scotland national football team captains
