= Charlie Cooke =

Scottish footballer

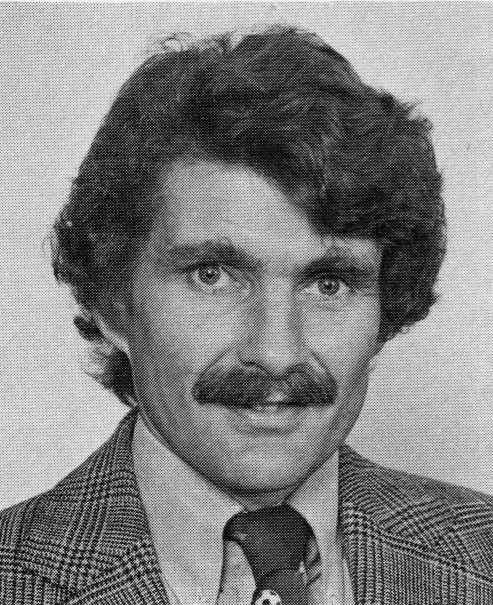
- Cooke circa 1980

Personal information
- Full name: Charles Cooke
- Date of birth: 14 October 1942 (age 84)
- Place of birth: St Monans, Fife, Scotland
- Height: 1.74 m (5 ft 8 1/2 in)
- Position: Winger

Youth career
- Port Glasgow
- Renfrew Juniors

Senior career*
Years	Team	Apps	(Gls)
1960–1964	Aberdeen	125	(27)
1964–1966	Dundee	44	(11)
1966–1972	Chelsea	212	(15)
1972–1974	Crystal Palace	44	(0)
1974–1978	Chelsea	87	(7)
1976–1978	Los Angeles Aztecs	48	(6)
1978–1980	Memphis Rogues	54	(3)
1979–1980	Memphis Rogues (indoor)	11	(3)
1980–1981	Calgary Boomers (indoor)	18	(4)
1981	California Surf	29	(3)
1981–1982	Cleveland Force (indoor)	19	(4)
1985	Dallas Sidekicks (indoor)	2	(0)
Total		693	(83)

International career
1962–1965	Scottish League XI	4	(3)
1962–1968	Scotland U23	5	(0)
1965–1975	Scotland	16	(0)

Managerial career
- 1979–1980: Memphis Rogues
- 1986–1988: Wichita Wings
- * Club domestic league appearances and goals

Charles Cooke (born 14 October 1942) is a Scottish former footballer who played as a winger for Aberdeen, Dundee, Chelsea and Crystal Palace, before ending his career in the United States.

== Club career ==
After playing at youth level for Port Glasgow and Renfrew Juniors, Cooke began his professional career with Aberdeen in 1960, making his first team debut on 13 August in a 4–3 Scottish League Cup victory over Ayr United. He moved to Dundee in December 1964, where he was voted player of the year. He signed for Chelsea in April 1966 for a then club record of £72,000 as part of manager Tommy Docherty's restructuring of the Chelsea side. He made his debut in May 1966 during a 2–0 Inter-Cities Fairs Cup win over FC Barcelona. On his league debut the following season against West Ham United, Cooke waltzed past England's World Cup-winning captain Bobby Moore en route to scoring the winner for Chelsea. Cooke took the place of Bert Murray on the right wing as several players were replaced owing to a growing rift between Docherty and his players. He proved a versatile player when the post World Cup tactics limited the use of wingers and he was often played in a deeper right midfield position behind Tommy Baldwin who had replaced George Graham in a direct swap between Chelsea and Arsenal. His debut season saw Chelsea reach the FA Cup final against Tottenham Hotspur (Cooke's cross had created Tony Hateley's winner for Chelsea in the semi-final against Leeds United). Cooke had a shot tipped over the bar by Pat Jennings early on, but Chelsea generally underperformed and lost 2–1.

In the early 1970s, Cooke was one of the star players in a flamboyant Chelsea side, alongside Peter Bonetti, Peter Osgood, Alan Hudson and Ian Hutchinson. They reached another FA Cup final, against Leeds United, in 1970. The first game ended 2–2 and, with Chelsea trailing 1–0 in the replay at Old Trafford with the clock running down, Cooke's run and chipped pass set up Osgood's equaliser with a diving header; Chelsea eventually won 2–1 after extra time. The Cup Winners' Cup was added in 1971 with a replayed win over Real Madrid in Athens. Chelsea reached a third consecutive cup final in 1972, this time the League Cup, and though Cooke again created the equaliser for Osgood, Chelsea lost to Stoke City.

He was sold to Crystal Palace shortly afterwards for £85,000 and made 44 appearances for the South London side, but returned to Chelsea a year later. By that stage, the club were in decline and were relegated in 1974–75, though Cooke's experience proved invaluable in helping manager and ex-teammate Eddie McCreadie's young side earn promotion again in 1976–77. In his two spells at Chelsea, Cooke made 373 appearances, scoring 30 goals.

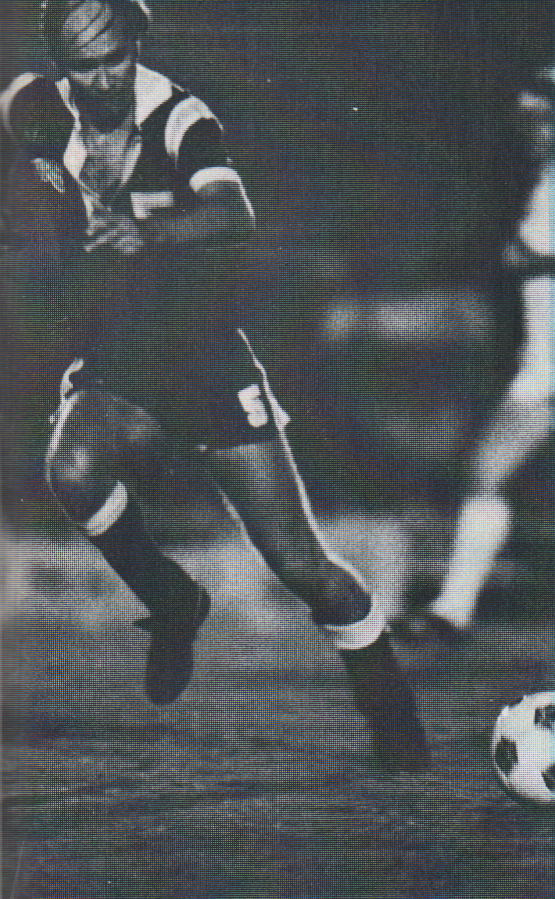
Cooke with the Los Angeles Aztecs (c. 1976–78)

Cooke left Chelsea for the second and final time in July 1978 to play for numerous American teams, including the Memphis Rogues, Los Angeles Aztecs and California Surf in the now-defunct NASL.

== International career ==
Cooke was a Scotland international, winning 16 caps. He made his debut in a 4–1 win over Wales in 1965 and played his final match in 1975 against Portugal. He also won 5 caps for the under-23 side between 1962 and 1968.

== Post-playing career ==
In 1979, he replaced his old Chelsea teammate, Eddie McCreadie, as the head coach of the Memphis Rogues. After new ownership moved the team to Calgary, Cooke himself moved to the California Surf where he played one last outdoor season. After this however, he continued to play in the indoor leagues, making his last appearance in the 1985–86 season for the Dallas Sidekicks, after which he took charge of the Wichita Wings.

He now runs a soccer school in Cincinnati, Ohio. In 2006, his autobiography The Bonnie Prince, written with Martin Knight, was published.

== Career statistics ==
=== Club ===
Appearances and goals by club, season and competition
Club	Season	League			National Cup		Other Cups		Europe		Total	
Club	Season	Division	Apps	Goals	Apps	Goals	Apps	Goals	Apps	Goals	Apps	Goals
Aberdeen	1960–61	Scottish Division One	32	10	2	0	5	0	—		39	10
Aberdeen	1961–62	Scottish Division One	29	5	5	0	5	2	—		39	7
Aberdeen	1962–63	Scottish Division One	27	8	3	0	6	0	—		36	8
Aberdeen	1963–64	Scottish Division One	22	3	4	0	4	0	—		30	3
Aberdeen	1964–65	Scottish Division One	15	1	0	0	6	1	—		21	2
Aberdeen	Total		125	27	14	0	26	3	—		165	30
Dundee	1964–65	Scottish Division One	18	7	1	0	6	0	0	0	25	7
Dundee	1965–66	Scottish Division One	26	4	2	0	6	0	—		34	4
Dundee	Total		44	11	3	0	12	0	0	0	59	11
Chelsea	1965–66	First Division	0	0	0	0	0	0	2	0	2	0
Chelsea	1966–67	First Division	33	3	7	0	3	0	—		43	3
Chelsea	1967–68	First Division	41	3	5	1	1	1	—		47	5
Chelsea	1968–69	First Division	26	0	5	1	2	0	3	1	36	2
Chelsea	1969–70	First Division	35	4	6	0	3	1	—		44	5
Chelsea	1970–71	First Division	31	1	3	0	3	0	8	0	45	1
Chelsea	1971–72	First Division	38	2	3	1	7	1	4	0	52	4
Chelsea	1972–73	First Division	8	2	0	0	0	0	—		8	2
Chelsea	Total		212	15	29	3	19	3	17	1	277	22
Crystal Palace	1972–73	First Division	29	0	3	1	4	0	—		36	1
Crystal Palace	1973–74	Second Division	15	0	1	0	1	0	—		17	0
Crystal Palace	Total		44	0	4	1	5	0	—		53	1
Chelsea	1973–74	First Division	17	1	0	0	0	0	—		17	1
Chelsea	1974–75	First Division	39	5	1	0	4	1	—		44	6
Chelsea	1975–76	Second Division	17	1	3	0	0	0	—		20	1
Chelsea	1976–77	Second Division	8	0	0	0	0	0	—		8	0
Chelsea	1977–78	First Division	6	0	1	0	0	0	—		7	0
Chelsea	Total		87	7	5	0	4	1	—		96	8
Los Angeles Aztecs	1976	NASL	12	2	—		—		—		12	2
Los Angeles Aztecs	1977	NASL	20	2	—		—		—		20	2
Los Angeles Aztecs	1978	NASL	16	2	—		—		—		16	2
Los Angeles Aztecs	Total		48	6	—		—		—		48	6
Memphis Rogues	1978	NASL	7	0	—		—		—		7	0
Memphis Rogues	1979	NASL	22	2	—		—		—		22	2
Memphis Rogues	1980	NASL	25	1	—		—		—		25	1
Memphis Rogues	Total		54	3	—		—		—		54	3
Memphis Rogues (indoor)	1979–80	NASL Indoor	11	3	—		—		—		11	3
Calgary Boomers (indoor)	1980–81	NASL Indoor	18	4	—		—		—		18	4
California Surf	1981	NASL	29	3	—		—		—		29	3
Cleveland Force (indoor)	1981–82	MISL	19	4	—		—		—		19	4
Dallas Sidekicks (indoor)	1985–86	MISL	2	0	—		—		—		2	0
Career total			693	83	55	4	66	7	17	1	831	95

=== International ===
Appearances and goals by national team and year
National team	Year	Apps	Goals
Scotland	1965	2	0
Scotland	1966	2	0
Scotland	1968	4	0
Scotland	1969	5	0
Scotland	1971	1	0
Scotland	1975	2	0
Total		16	0

== Managerial statistics ==
Team	From	To	Record				
Team	From	To	P	W	D	L	Win %
Memphis Rogues	1979	1980	54	18	0	36	33.33
Memphis Rogues (indoor)	1979	1980	12	9	0	3	75.00
Wichita Wings (indoor)	1986	30 January 1988	79	38	0	41	48.10
Total			145	65	0	80	44.83

== Honours ==
Chelsea

- FA Cup: 1969–70; runner-up: 1966–67
- European Cup Winners' Cup: 1970–71
- Football League Cup runner-up: 1971–72

Individual

- Dundee Player of the Year: 1966
- World XI: 1967
- Chelsea Player of the Year: 1968, 1975
- NASL All-Stars: 1976 Honorable Mention, 1977 Second Team
