= Doug Coutts =

Scottish footballer

Personal information
- Date of birth: 3 March 1942 (age 84)
- Place of birth: Aberdeen, Scotland
- Date of death: 25 April 2025
- Position: Defender

Youth career
- Banks O' Dee

Senior career*
Years	Team	Apps	(Gls)
1960–1965	Aberdeen	98	(3)
1965–1969	Berwick Rangers	121	(3)
1969–1972	Wigan Athletic	102	(2)
1972–1973	Altrincham		
- * Club domestic league appearances and goals

Doug Coutts was a Scottish former professional football defender who played for Aberdeen, Berwick Rangers, Wigan Athletic and Altrincham.

He played for Wigan between 1969 and 1972, making 102 appearances and scoring two goals for the club in the Northern Premier League.

== Career statistics ==
Appearances and goals by club, season and competition
Club	Season	League			National Cup		League Cup		Europe		Total	
Club	Season	Division	Apps	Goals	Apps	Goals	Apps	Goals	Apps	Goals	Apps	Goals
Aberdeen	1959-60	Scottish Division One	5	0	0	0	0	0	0	0	5	0
Aberdeen	1960-61	Scottish Division One	17	1	2	1	3	0	0	0	22	2
Aberdeen	1961-62	Scottish Division One	6	0	0	0	1	0	0	0	7	0
Aberdeen	1962-63	Scottish Division One	31	1	3	0	1	0	0	0	35	1
Aberdeen	1963-64	Scottish Division One	28	0	4	0	2	0	0	0	34	0
Aberdeen	1964-65	Scottish Division One	11	1	1	0	6	0	0	0	18	1
Aberdeen	Total		98	3	10	1	13	0	0	0	121	4
