= Dave Bennett (footballer, born 1938) =

Scottish footballer (1938–1988)

Personal information
- Full name: David Bennett
- Date of birth: 21 November 1938
- Place of birth: Aberdeen, Scotland
- Date of death: 1 June 1988 (aged 49)
- Place of death: Aberdeen, Scotland
- Height: 5 ft 10 in (1.78 m)
- Position: Right-back

Youth career
- Sunnybank

Senior career*
Years	Team	Apps	(Gls)
1960–1966	Aberdeen	111	(0)
- * Club domestic league appearances and goals

Dave Bennett (21 November 1938 – 1 June 1988) was a Scottish professional footballer who played as a right-back for Aberdeen.

Bennett played youth football with Sunnybank before starting his professional career with Aberdeen in 1960. After six years at Aberdeen, he left to join Inverness Caledonian.

== Career statistics ==
=== Appearances and goals by club, season and competition ===
Club	Season	League			Scottish Cup		League Cup		Europe		Total	
Club	Season	Division	Apps	Goals	Apps	Goals	Apps	Goals	Apps	Goals	Apps	Goals
Aberdeen	1960-61	Scottish Division One	31	0	2	0	3	0	0	0	36	0
Aberdeen	1961-62	Scottish Division One	21	0	5	0	0	0	0	0	26	0
Aberdeen	1962-63	Scottish Division One	22	0	3	0	1	0	0	0	26	0
Aberdeen	1963-64	Scottish Division One	5	0	0	0	0	0	0	0	5	0
Aberdeen	1964-65	Scottish Division One	21	0	2	0	6	0	0	0	29	0
Aberdeen	1965-66	Scottish Division One	11	0	0	0	6	0	0	0	17	0
Aberdeen	Total		111	0	12	0	16	0	0	0	139	0
