= Muirkirk Juniors F.C. =

Association football club in Scotland

Muirkirk
- Full name: Muirkirk Junior Football Club
- Nickname(s): The Kirk
- Founded: 1937
- Ground: Burnside Park, Muirkirk
- Capacity: 3000
- Manager: Ross Cusick
- League: West of Scotland League Second Division
- 2023–24: West of Scotland League Second Division, 9th of 16
- Website: https://www.pitchero.com/clubs/muirkirkjuniorsfc
Home colours	Away colours

Muirkirk Football Club are a Scottish football club, based in the village of Muirkirk, East Ayrshire. Nicknamed the Kirk, they were formed in 1937, and they play at Burnside Park. Currently playing in the West of Scotland League Second Division.

The team has been managed by Ross Cusick since 2023 who joined from Benburb FC where he was under 20s manager.

Over the club's 80-year history, many players have made the move to senior clubs. They also have ultras called the kirky boys founded in 2022 John McGuigan started as a youngster at Muirkirk before going on to play with Newcastle United, Southampton and Swansea City, Bernie Kelly went on to play with Leicester City and Middlesbrough, and Eric Caldow notched up 265 appearances for Rangers.

== Current squad ==
As of July 2021

Note: Flags indicate national team as defined under FIFA eligibility rules; some limited exceptions apply. Players may hold more than one non-FIFA nationality.

No.	Pos.	Nation	Player
1	GK	(Scotland) SCO	Cameron Powell
2	DF	(Scotland) SCO	Gerard Burns
3	DF	(Scotland) SCO	Marc Capaldi
4	DF	(Scotland) SCO	James Hazlett
5	DF	(Scotland) SCO	Aiden McLaughlin
6	MF	(Scotland) SCO	William Dawson
7	MF	(Scotland) SCO	Regan Cusick
8	MF	(Scotland) SCO	James Ferguson
9	FW	(Scotland) SCO	Ethan Brew
10	FW	(Scotland) SCO	Jamie McDermott
11	MF	(Scotland) SCO	Jake Lewis

No.	Pos.	Nation	Player
12	MF	(Scotland) SCO	Connor McFarlane
13	GK	(Scotland) SCO	Ross Shaw
14	MF	(Scotland) SCO	Jordan Hendry
15	DF	(Scotland) SCO	Ciaran McAndrew
16	DF	(Scotland) SCO	Thomas Rough
17	MF	(Scotland) SCO	Ruairidh Currie
18	DF	(Scotland) SCO	Bradley Faulds
19	DF	(Scotland) SCO	Kieran O’Hear

== Coaching staff ==
As of 6 September 2020

Role	Name
Manager	(Scotland) Ross Cusick
Coach	(Scotland) Andrew Gordon
Coach	(Scotland) Kieran O’Hear
Goalkeeping coach	(Scotland) Harry McLaughlin
Physiotherapist	(Scotland) Eilidh McGowan
Kit Manager	(Scotland) vacant

== Honours ==
- Ayrshire Second Division winners: 1984–85
- West Region League Two Runners Up: 2019–20
