= John Ogston =

Scottish footballer (1939–2017)

Personal information
- Full name: John Kessack Ogston
- Date of birth: 15 January 1939
- Place of birth: Aberdeen, Scotland
- Date of death: 16 August 2017 (age 78)
- Position: Goalkeeper

Youth career
- Banks O' Dee

Senior career*
Years	Team	Apps	(Gls)
1958–1966	Aberdeen	179	(0)
1966–1969	Liverpool	1	(0)
1968–1969	→ Doncaster Rovers	31	(0)
1969–1971	Doncaster Rovers	39	(0)
1971–1972	Buckie Thistle		
1972	Huntly		
1972–	Rothes		
1974	Fraserburgh		
1974	Deveronvale		

International career
1961	SFL trial v SFA	1	(0)
1961–1962	Scotland U23	3	(0)
- * Club domestic league appearances and goals

John Kessack Ogston (15 January 1939 – 16 August 2017) was a Scottish professional footballer, who played as a goalkeeper for Aberdeen, Liverpool and Doncaster Rovers.

Ogston was born in Aberdeen and played youth football with Banks O' Dee where he won the Scottish Junior Cup in 1957. A year later in 1958, he started his professional career with Aberdeen. He was fondly known as "Tubby" in his time there.

He joined English club Liverpool for a fee of £10,000 in September 1965, but his only first team appearance was in a 3–1 League victory over Newcastle United on 7 April 1967.

He moved to Doncaster Rovers in 1968 on loan, and then signed permanently the following season. Whilst at Doncaster, he was a member of the Fourth Division title winning side of 1968–69, and made a total of 77 appearances in League and cup.

In 1971, he returned north of the border to play for Buckie Thistle for a season, before playing with several teams in the Highland League, including Huntly, Rothes, Fraserburgh, and Deveronvale. He finally retired on 16 September 1974.

== Career statistics ==
Appearances and goals by club, season and competition
Club	Season	League			National Cup		League Cup		Total	
Club	Season	Division	Apps	Goals	Apps	Goals	Apps	Goals	Apps	Goals
Aberdeen	1958–59	Scottish Division One	3	0	0	0	0	0	3	0
Aberdeen	1959–60	Scottish Division One	16	0	1	0	3	0	20	0
Aberdeen	1960–61	Scottish Division One	26	0	2	0	3	0	31	0
Aberdeen	1961–62	Scottish Division One	31	0	5	0	6	0	42	0
Aberdeen	1962–63	Scottish Division One	34	0	3	0	6	0	43	0
Aberdeen	1963–64	Scottish Division One	34	0	4	0	6	0	44	0
Aberdeen	1964–65	Scottish Division One	34	0	2	0	6	0	42	0
Aberdeen	1965–66	Scottish Division One	1	0	0	0	4	0	5	0
Aberdeen	Total		179	0	17	0	34	0	230	0
Liverpool	1965–66	First Division	0	0	0	0	0	0	0	0
Liverpool	1966–67	First Division	1	0	0	0	0	0	1	0
Liverpool	1967–68	First Division	0	0	0	0	0	0	0	0
Liverpool	1968–69	First Division	0	0	0	0	0	0	0	0
Liverpool	Total		1	0	0	0	0	0	1	0
Doncaster Rovers (loan)	1968–69	Fourth Division	31	0	–	–	–	–	31+	0+
Doncaster Rovers	1969–70	Third Division	38	0	–	–	–	–	38+	0+
Doncaster Rovers	1970–71	Third Division	1	0	–	–	–	–	1+	0+
Doncaster Rovers	Total		70	0	-	-	-	-	70+	0+
Career total			250	0	17+	0+	34+	0+	301+	0+
