= Jimmy Hogg =

Scottish footballer

Personal information
- Full name: James Hogg
- Date of death: 14 January 1984
- Height: 5 ft 11 in (1.80 m)
- Position: Left-back

Youth career
- Preston Athletic

Senior career*
Years	Team	Apps	(Gls)
1956–1965	Aberdeen	214	(1)
- Caledonian
- * Club domestic league appearances and goals

Jimmy Hogg is a Scottish former professional football left-back who played for Aberdeen.

Hogg was appointed captain of Aberdeen in 1962, but was released in 1965 when he signed for Inverness Caledonian in the Scottish Highland Football League.

== Career statistics ==
Appearances and goals by club, season and competition
Club	Season	League			Scottish Cup		League Cup		Europe		Total	
Club	Season	Division	Apps	Goals	Apps	Goals	Apps	Goals	Apps	Goals	Apps	Goals
Aberdeen	1955–56	Scottish Division One	0	0	0	0	0	0	0	0	0	0
Aberdeen	1956–57	Scottish Division One	8	0	0	0	4	0	0	0	12	0
Aberdeen	1957-58	Scottish Division One	27	0	2	0	7	0	0	0	36	0
Aberdeen	1958-59	Scottish Division One	32	0	6	0	6	0	0	0	44	0
Aberdeen	1959-60	Scottish Division One	34	0	3	0	6	0	0	0	43	0
Aberdeen	1960-61	Scottish Division One	14	1	0	0	3	0	0	0	17	1
Aberdeen	1961-62	Scottish Division One	18	0	4	0	5	0	0	0	27	0
Aberdeen	1962-63	Scottish Division One	34	0	3	0	6	0	0	0	43	0
Aberdeen	1963-64	Scottish Division One	32	0	4	0	6	0	0	0	42	0
Aberdeen	1964-65	Scottish Division One	15	0	0	0	0	0	0	0	15	0
Aberdeen	Total		214	1	22	0	43	0	0	0	279	1
Career total			214	1	22	0	43	0	0	0	279	1
