= Billy Little =

Scottish football player and manager (1940–2026)

Personal information
- Date of birth: 4 February 1940
- Place of birth: Dumfries, Scotland
- Date of death: 6 November 2026 (aged 86)
- Place of death: Larbert, Scotland
- Position: Forward

Youth career
- Dumfries Academy

Senior career*
Years	Team	Apps	(Gls)
1957–1969	Aberdeen	237	(78)
1969–1970	Caledonian		
1970–1971	Falkirk	4	(1)
1971–1972	Stirling Albion	18	(3)
1972–1973	East Stirlingshire	18	(1)
Total		277	(83)

Managerial career
- 1977–1979: Falkirk
- 1979–1980: Queen of the South
- 1983–1985: East Stirlingshire
- 1990: Alloa Athletic
- 1993–1997: East Stirlingshire
- * Club domestic league appearances and goals

Billy Little (4 February 1940 – 6 November 2026) was a Scottish professional football player and manager. A forward, he spent most of his playing career at Aberdeen.

== Playing career ==
Little joined Aberdeen in 1957, having played in Scottish School Boys' defeat of England Schools at Parkhead that year. He made over 300 appearances for Aberdeen, scoring 98 goals over 12 years. While at Aberdeen, Little was a Scottish League and under-23 internationalist. Little moved to Australia in 1969. He returned to Scotland a year later, signing for Highland Football League club Caledonian. He then moved back into the Scottish League and had spells with Falkirk, Stirling Albion, East Stirlingshire and Alloa Athletic.

== Managerial career ==
Little managed Falkirk and hometown club Queen of the South. It was he who, as Queen's manager, signed Jimmy Robertson for the Palmerston Park club.

== Personal life and death ==
Little was born in Dumfries, Scotland, on 4 February 1940. He died at a hospital in Larbert on 6 November 2026, aged 86.

== Playing statistics ==
Appearances and goals by club, season and competition
Club	Season	League			Scottish Cup		League Cup		Europe		Total	
Club	Season	Division	Apps	Goals	Apps	Goals	Apps	Goals	Apps	Goals	Apps	Goals
Aberdeen	1957–58	Scottish Division One	8	4	1	0	1	0	0	0	10	4
Aberdeen	1958–59	Scottish Division One	29	13	4	2	6	1	0	0	39	16
Aberdeen	1959–60	Scottish Division One	30	9	3	0	3	0	0	0	36	9
Aberdeen	1960–61	Scottish Division One	29	12	1	0	3	1	0	0	33	13
Aberdeen	1961–62	Scottish Division One	30	17	5	5	5	3	0	0	40	25
Aberdeen	1962–63	Scottish Division One	16	6	0	0	5	2	0	0	21	8
Aberdeen	1963–64	Scottish Division One	10	0	3	0	6	1	0	0	19	1
Aberdeen	1964–65	Scottish Division One	21	3	0	0	0	0	0	0	21	3
Aberdeen	1965–66	Scottish Division One	34	10	4	1	6	1	0	0	44	12
Aberdeen	1966–67	Scottish Division One	14	1	1	0	10	3	0	0	25	4
Aberdeen	1967–68	Scottish Division One	15	3	1	0	0	0	1	0	17	3
Aberdeen	1968–69	Scottish Division One	1	0	0	0	0	0	0	0	1	0
Aberdeen	Total		237	78	23	8	45	12	1	0	306	98
Caledonian	1969–70	Highland League										
Falkirk	1970–71	Scottish Division One	6	1	0	0	1	1	0	0	7	2
Stirling Albion	1971–72	Scottish Division Two	18	3							18+	3+
East Stirlingshire	1972–73	Scottish Division Two	18	1							18+	1+
Career total			279	83	23+	8+	46+	13+	1	0	349+	104+

== Managerial statistics ==
Team	From	To	Record				
Team	From	To	P	W	L	D	Win %
Falkirk	1977	1979	99	38	30	31	38.38%
Queen of the South	1979	1980	45	14	21	10	31.11%
East Stirlingshire	1983	1985	-	-	-	-	-
Alloa Athletic	1990	1990	14	2	7	5	14.29%
East Stirlingshire	1993	1997	146	49	62	35	33.56%
Career total			304+	103+	120+	81+	29.40%

== Honours ==
East Stirlingshire

- Stirlingshire Cup: 1984-85
