= George Kinnell =

Scottish footballer (1937–2021)

Personal information
- Full name: George Kinnell
- Date of birth: 22 December 1937
- Place of birth: Cowdenbeath, Scotland
- Date of death: 16 October 2021 (aged 83)
- Position: Midfielder

Senior career*
Years	Team	Apps	(Gls)
- Crossgates Primrose
1959–1963	Aberdeen	130	(20)
1963–1966	Stoke City	91	(6)
1966–1967	Oldham Athletic	12	(8)
1966–1968	Sunderland	69	(3)
1967	→ Vancouver Royal Canadians (loan)	12	(2)
1968–1969	Middlesbrough	13	(1)
1969–1970	Brunswick Juventus	27	(4)
Total		354	(44)
- * Club domestic league appearances and goals

George Kinnell (22 December 1937 – 16 October 2021) was a Scottish footballer who played in the Football League for Middlesbrough, Oldham Athletic, Sunderland and Stoke City.

== Career ==
Born in Cowdenbeath, Kinnell started his career in Scotland firstly playing for junior club Crossgates Primrose before joining Aberdeen in 1959 for £200. After serving four years with the "Dons" Kinnell earned a move to English Football League side Stoke City in 1963 for a fee of £35,000.

Although he was a midfielder by trade manager Tony Waddington played him in forward position during the 1965–66 season due his physical strength. He never managed to adapt to his new role and quickly returned to the midfield. He later joined Oldham Athletic, Sunderland, and Middlesbrough and he finished his career in Australia, firstly in Melbourne with Juventus where he helped the club win the Victorian State League and Dockerty Cup in 1970 and then in Perth, with Kingsway Olympic and Kiev.

== Personal life ==
Kinnell was the brother of footballer Andy Kinnell and the cousin of Scotland international Jim Baxter.

He died on 16 October 2021, at the age of 83.

== Career statistics ==
Appearances and goals by club, season and competition
Club	Season	League			FA Cup		League Cup		Total	
Club	Season	Division	Apps	Goals	Apps	Goals	Apps	Goals	Apps	Goals
Aberdeen	1959–60	Scottish Division One	21	1	3	0	0	0	24	1
Aberdeen	1960–61	Scottish Division One	31	3	1	0	6	0	38	3
Aberdeen	1961–62	Scottish Division One	33	3	5	2	6	1	42	6
Aberdeen	1962–63	Scottish Division One	34	10	3	2	5	0	42	12
Aberdeen	1963–64	Scottish Division One	11	3	0	0	6	0	15	3
Aberdeen	Total		130	20	12	4	23	1	165	25
Stoke City	1963–64	First Division	24	3	5	0	5	2	34	5
Stoke City	1964–65	First Division	40	1	3	0	3	0	46	1
Stoke City	1965–66	First Division	27	2	0	0	4	0	31	2
Stoke City	Total		91	6	8	0	12	2	111	8
Oldham Athletic	1966–67	Third Division	12	8	1	0	0	0	13	8
Sunderland	1966–67	First Division	29	0	5	0	0	0	34	0
Sunderland	1967–68	First Division	37	3	2	0	3	3	42	6
Sunderland	1968–69	First Division	3	0	0	0	0	0	3	0
Sunderland	Total		69	3	7	0	3	3	79	6
Vancouver Royal Canadians (loan)	1967	United Soccer Association	12	2	—		—		12	2
Middlesbrough	1968–69	Second Division	13	1	1	0	0	0	14	1
Career total			327	40	29	4	38	6	394	50

== Honours ==
Stoke City

- Football League Cup runner-up: 1963–64
