= Ian Burns (footballer) =

Scottish footballer

Personal information
- Full name: Ian Burns
- Date of birth: 19 April 1939
- Place of birth: Aberdeen, Scotland
- Date of death: 6 December 2015 (aged 76)
- Place of death: Labert, Falkirk, Scotland
- Height: 5 ft 9 in (1.75 m)
- Position: Right-half

Youth career
- 1949–1952: Banks O' Dee

Senior career*
Years	Team	Apps	(Gls)
1957–1965	Aberdeen	142	(2)
1966–1970	Brechin City	82	(5)
Total		197	(6)
- * Club domestic league appearances and goals

Ian Burns (19 April 1939 – 6 December 2015) was a Scottish professional football right-half who played for Aberdeen and Brechin City.

== Career statistics ==
Appearances and goals by club, season and competition
Club	Season	League			Scottish Cup		League Cup		Europe		Total	
Club	Season	Division	Apps	Goals	Apps	Goals	Apps	Goals	Apps	Goals	Apps	Goals
Aberdeen	1957–58	Scottish Division One	13	1	0	0	7	4	0	0	20	5
Aberdeen	1958–59	Scottish Division One	21	0	3	0	6	0	0	0	30	0
Aberdeen	1959–60	Scottish Division One	22	0	2	0	2	0	0	0	26	0
Aberdeen	1960–61	Scottish Division One	21	1	2	0	6	0	0	0	29	1
Aberdeen	1961–62	Scottish Division One	19	0	4	0	3	0	0	0	26	0
Aberdeen	1962–63	Scottish Division One	0	0	0	0	0	0	0	0	0	0
Aberdeen	1963–64	Scottish Division One	26	0	4	0	0	0	0	0	30	0
Aberdeen	1964–65	Scottish Division One	18	0	1	0	4	0	0	0	23	0
Aberdeen	1965–66	Scottish Division One	2	0	0	0	6	0	0	0	8	0
Aberdeen	Total		142	2	16	0	34	4	0	0	192	6
