= Bernie Kelly (footballer) =

Scottish footballer

Personal information
- Full name: Bernard Kelly
- Date of birth: 21 October 1932
- Place of birth: New Stevenston, Scotland
- Date of death: 8 October 2004 (aged 71)
- Place of death: Detroit, United States
- Position: Inside forward

Youth career
- Muirkirk

Senior career*
Years	Team	Apps	(Gls)
1951–1958	Raith Rovers	160	(67)
1958–1959	Leicester City	24	(13)
1959	Nottingham Forest	2	(0)
1959–1960	Aberdeen	4	(1)
1960–1961	Raith Rovers	14	(3)
1961–1962	Cowdenbeath	1	(0)
1962–	Vale of Leithen		
Total		205	(84)

International career
1957	Scotland B	1	(0)
1957	Scottish Football League XI	1	(1)

Managerial career
- 1965: Cumberland United
- * Club domestic league appearances and goals

Bernie Kelly (21 October 1932 – 8 October 2004) was a Scottish footballer.

In the British Isles he played for Raith Rovers, Leicester City, Nottingham Forest, Aberdeen, Raith Rovers, Cowdenbeath and Vale of Leithen.

In May 1963 he arrived in Sydney, Australia to play for Gladesville-Ryde in the state league of New South Wales. In 1965 he became coach of Cumberland United, a side created through the amalgamation of Gladeville-Ryde and Auburn.
