= Willie Logie =

Canadian-born Scottish footballer

Personal information
- Date of birth: 20 September 1932
- Place of birth: Montreal, Quebec, Canada
- Date of death: 20 June 2016 (aged 83)
- Place of death: Stirling, Scotland, UK
- Position: Wing half

Youth career
- Cambuslang Rangers

Senior career*
Years	Team	Apps	(Gls)
1956–1958	Rangers	16	(0)
1958–1959	Aberdeen	6	(0)
1959–1960	Arbroath		
1960–1961	Brechin City		
1961	Alloa Athletic		
- * Club domestic league appearances and goals

William Logie (20 September 1932 – 20 June 2016) was a Scottish footballer, who played for Cambuslang Rangers, Rangers, Aberdeen, Arbroath, Brechin City, and Alloa Athletic.
