= 1960–61 Aberdeen F.C. season =

Aberdeen F.C.
1960–61 season
- Chairman: Charles B. Forbes
- Manager: Tommy Pearson
- Scottish League Division One: 6th
- Scottish Cup: 3rd Round
- Scottish League Cup: Group stage
- Top goalscorer: League: Ken Brownlee (18); All: Ken Brownlee (23)
- Highest home attendance: 23,000 vs. Dundee, 2 January 1961
- Lowest home attendance: 6,000 vs. Hibernian, 25 March 1961
Home colours

The 1960–61 season was Aberdeen's 49th season in the top flight of Scottish football and their 50th season overall. Aberdeen competed in the Scottish League Division One, Scottish League Cup, and the Scottish Cup

== Results ==
Own goals in italics

=== Division 1 ===
Match Day	Date	Opponent	H/A	Score	Aberdeen Scorer(s)	Attendance
1	24 August	Dunfermline Athletic	H	1–4	Davidson	12,000
2	10 September	Dundee	A	3–3	Burns, Hamilton, Little	12,000
3	17 September	St Johnstone	H	4–2	Mulhall, Hogg, Davidson, Brownlee	10,000
4	24 September	Celtic	A	0–0		18,000
5	1 October	Ayr United	A	1–1	Mulhall	5,000
6	8 October	Third Lanark	H	5–3	Davidson (2), Cooke, Kinnell, Little	11,000
7	15 October	Clyde	H	1–1	Cooke	11,000
8	22 October	Raith Rovers	A	3–0	Mulhall, Little, Cooke	5,000
9	29 October	Airdrieonians	H	1–1	Cooke	13,000
10	5 November	Heart of Midlothian	A	4–3	Cooke, Mulhall, Davidson, Little	20,000
11	12 November	Motherwell	H	3–3	Davidson (2), Little	11,000
12	19 November	Hibernian	A	2–2	Brownlee (2)	12,000
13	26 November	Dundee United	H	1–3	Kinnell	13,000
14	3 December	Rangers	A	0–4		25,000
15	10 December	Kilmarnock	H	3–2	Brownlee (2), Little	13,000
16	17 December	Partick Thistle	H	2–1	Donlevy, Cooke	13,000
17	24 December	St Mirren	A	3–1	Mulhall (2), Cooke	9,000
18	31 December	Dunfermline Athletic	A	6–2	Brownlee (4), Cooke, Kinnell	8,335
19	2 January	Dundee	H	2–1	Brownlee, Mulhall	23,000
20	7 January	St Johnstone	A	1–2	Brownlee	11,000
21	14 January	Celtic	H	1–3	Brownlee	20,000
22	21 January	Ayr United	H	3–1	Bennett, Little, Brownlee	9,000
23	4 February	Third Lanark	A	1–5	Brownlee	8,500
24	18 February	Clyde	H	4–2	Little (2), Brownlee, Mulhall	12,000
25	1 March	Raith Rovers	H	0–1		8,000
26	4 March	Airdrieonians	A	1–3	Little	5,000
27	11 March	Kilmarnock	A	1–4	Mulhall	8,000
28	14 March	Heart of Midlothian	H	0–2		11,500
29	18 March	Motherwell	A	0–1		7,000
30	25 March	Hibernian	H	1–4	Coutts	6,000
31	1 April	Dundee United	A	3–3	Cummings (2), Brownlee	5,000
32	8 April	Rangers	H	6–1	Cummings (3), Little, Brownlee, Cooke	20,000
33	22 April	Partick Thistle	A	4–3	Cooke, Cummings, Mulhall, Brownlee	8,000
34	28 April	St Mirren	H	1–0	Little	8,000

==== Final standings ====
Pos	Team	Pld	W	D	L	GF	GA	GR	Pts	Qualification or relegation
4	Celtic	34	15	9	10	64	46	1.391	39	
5	Motherwell	34	15	8	11	70	57	1.228	38	
6	Aberdeen	34	14	8	12	72	72	1.000	36	
7	Hearts	34	13	8	13	51	53	0.962	34	Invited for the Inter-Cities Fairs Cup
8	Hibernian	34	15	4	15	66	69	0.957	34	Invited for the Inter-Cities Fairs Cup

Source: RSSSF

=== Scottish League Cup ===
==== Group 4 ====
Round	Date	Opponent	H/A	Score	Aberdeen Scorer(s)	Attendance
1	13 August	Ayr United	H	4–3	McIntyre, Herron, Brownlee, Davidson	14,000
2	17 August	Raith Rovers	A	1–4	Little	6,000
3	20 August	Dundee	H	1–4	Hamilton	18,000
4	27 August	Ayr United	A	1–1	Mulhall	4,000
5	31 August	Raith Rovers	H	3–0	Davidson (2), Mulhall	8,000
6	3 September	Dundee	A	0–6	Baird, Cooke	14,500

==== Group 4 final table ====
Team	Pld	W	D	L	GF	GA	GR	Pts
Dundee	6	6	0	0	23	2	11.500	12
Aberdeen	6	2	1	3	10	18	0.556	5
Raith Rovers	6	2	1	3	7	14	0.500	5
Ayr United	6	0	2	4	7	13	0.538	2

=== Scottish Cup ===
Round	Date	Opponent	H/A	Score	Aberdeen Scorer(s)	Attendance
R2	11 February	Deveronvale	H	4–2	Brownlee (2), Ewan, Hosie	14,200
R3	25 February	Dunfermline Athletic	H	3–6	Brownlee (2), Coutts	18,000

== Squad ==
=== Appearances & Goals ===
No.	Pos	Nat	Player	Total		Division One		Scottish Cup		League Cup	
No.	Pos	Nat	Player	Apps	Goals	Apps	Goals	Apps	Goals	Apps	Goals
	GK	(Scotland) SCO	John Ogston	31	0	26	0	2	0	3	0
	GK	(England) ENG	Chris Harker	11	0	8	0	0	0	3	0
	DF	(Scotland) SCO	George Kinnell	38	3	31	3	1	0	6	0
	DF	(Scotland) SCO	Dave Bennett	36	0	31	0	2	0	3	0
	DF	(Scotland) SCO	Doug Fraser	25	0	24	0	1	0	0	0
	DF	(Scotland) SCO	Doug Coutts	22	2	17	1	2	1	3	0
	DF	??	Gordon Sim	19	0	14	0	2	0	3	0
	DF	(Scotland) SCO	Jimmy Hogg (c)	17	1	14	1	0	0	3	0
	DF	(Scotland) SCO	Andy Cadenhead	8	0	8	0	0	0	0	0
	MF	(Scotland) SCO	George Mulhall	40	12	32	10	2	0	6	2
	MF	(Scotland) SCO	Ken Brownlee	36	23	29	18	2	4	5	1
	MF	(Scotland) SCO	Ian Burns	29	1	21	1	2	0	6	0
	MF	(Scotland) SCO	Dickie Ewen	20	1	18	0	2	1	0	0
	MF	(Scotland) SCO	Des Herron	7	1	1	0	0	0	6	1
	MF	(Scotland) SCO	Bob Wishart	6	0	3	0	0	0	3	0
	MF	(Scotland) SCO	Jimmy Robertson	3	0	2	0	0	0	1	0
	MF	(Scotland) SCO	Bobby Tait	2	0	2	0	0	0	0	0
	FW	(Scotland) SCO	Charlie Cooke	39	10	32	10	2	0	5	0
	FW	(Scotland) SCO	Billy Little	33	13	29	12	1	0	3	1
	FW	(Scotland) SCO	Norman Davidson	19	10	14	7	0	0	5	3
	FW	(Scotland) SCO	Hugh Baird	9	0	8	0	0	0	1	0
	FW	(England) ENG	Bobby Cummings	7	6	6	6	0	0	1	0
	FW	(Scotland) SCO	Jim Hosie	5	1	4	0	1	1	0	0
