= Andy Kinnell =

Scottish footballer

Personal information
- Date of birth: 14 February 1947 (age 79)
- Place of birth: Cowdenbeath, Scotland
- Position: Central midfielder

Youth career
- Foulford
- –1964: Cowdenbeath Royals

Senior career*
Years	Team	Apps	(Gls)
1964–	Cowdenbeath	1	(0)
–1965	Sauchie		
1965–1972	Cowdenbeath	229	(9)
1972–1976	St Johnstone	94	(0)
1976	Forfar Athletic	0	(0)
1976	St Johnstone	0	(0)
- Dundonald Bluebell
- * Club domestic league appearances and goals

Andrew Kinnell (born 14 February 1947) is a Scottish retired professional footballer who played as a central midfielder, making 230 appearances in the Scottish League for Cowdenbeath. He also played league football for St Johnstone.

== Honours ==
Cowdenbeath

- Scottish League Second Division second-place promotion: 1969–70

Individual

- Cowdenbeath Hall of Fame
