= Ken Ronaldson =

Scottish footballer (1945–2021)

Kenneth Ronaldson (27 September 1945 – 2021) was a Scottish professional footballer of the late 1960s. He played professionally for Aberdeen, Bristol Rovers and Gillingham and made a total of 82 appearances in the Football League. Ronaldson, who retired from football in 1970 and then worked in the Kent Police force, died in 2021.
