= Leif Mortensen (footballer) =

Danish footballer (born 1940)

Personal information
- Date of birth: 16 August 1940 (age 86)
- Place of birth: Copenhagen, Denmark
- Position: Winger

Youth career
- KB

Senior career*
Years	Team	Apps	(Gls)
1958–1961	KB	?	(?)
1961–1962	Udinese	5	(0)
1962–1964	KB	?	(?)
1964–1966	Aberdeen	15	(1)
Total		20	(1)

International career
1961	Denmark U21	2	(0)
- * Club domestic league appearances and goals

Leif Mortensen (born 16 August 1940) is a Danish former professional footballer who played throughout Europe as a winger.

== Career ==
Born in Copenhagen, Mortensen began his career with hometown club KB. He spent a year in Italy with Udinese, making five league appearances, before returning to KB. He later spent two seasons in Scotland with Aberdeen, scoring one goal in fifteen league appearances.

Mortensen also made two appearances for the Danish under-21 side in 1961.
