= Bobby Hume =

Scottish footballer (1941–1997)

Personal information
- Full name: Robert William Hume
- Date of birth: 18 March 1941
- Place of birth: Glasgow, Scotland
- Date of death: 26 March 1997 (aged 56)
- Place of death: Johannesburg, South Africa
- Position: Forward

Youth career
- Kirkintilloch Rob Roy

Senior career*
Years	Team	Apps	(Gls)
1959–1962	Rangers	17	(3)
1962–1963	Middlesbrough	19	(5)
1963–1965	Aberdeen	33	(4)
1964–1965	Alloa Athletic	3	(1)
1965–1970	Highlands Park	135	(35)
- * Club domestic league appearances and goals

Bobby Hume (18 March 1941 – 26 March 1997) was a Scottish professional footballer.

== Life and career ==
Born in Glasgow, his first club was the Scottish junior club Kirkintilloch Rob Roy. Hume signed for Rangers in 1959 and was to make 23 first-team appearances (including 17 League appearances) with them, scoring 3 goals. He made his Rangers début in December 1959 in a home match against Kilmarnock. He was on the Rangers side facing Fiorentina of Italy in the first leg of the first European Cup-Winners' Cup final in 1961, a final Rangers lost. The form of left-winger Davie Wilson probably limited his Rangers first-team appearance.

He was one of the first British footballers to wear contact lenses on the field of play. In 1962, he signed for Middlesbrough, where he made 19 first-team appearances (scoring 5 goals) before returning to Scotland, where he signed for Aberdeen (33 appearances and 4 goals in two seasons). He also played 3 times for Alloa Athletic, scoring a single goal.

In 1965, he emigrated to South Africa and signed for Johannesburg club Highlands Park; his brother Ronnie was a teammate. He helped Highlands Park win their fifth South African league title in seven years in 1966. After retirement, he lived in Johannesburg with his wife and four children. Hume was shot dead in March 1997 at the wheel of his car near his home, the victim of a carjacking.
