= Willie Callaghan (footballer, born 1941) =

Scottish footballer

Personal information
- Full name: William Andrew Callaghan
- Date of birth: 9 December 1941 (age 84)
- Place of birth: Glasgow, Scotland
- Position: Right winger

Youth career
- St. Francis Juveniles

Senior career*
Years	Team	Apps	(Gls)
1960–1961	East Stirlingshire	31	(4)
1961–1963	Aberdeen	24	(8)
1963	Toronto City		
1963–1964	Dumbarton	22	(6)
1964–1966	Barnsley	15	(0)
1966–1967	Albion Rovers	27	(5)
1967–1968	Stranraer	28	(1)
- St Roch's
Total		147	(24)
- * Club domestic league appearances and goals

Willie Callaghan (born 9 December 1941) is a Scottish former footballer, who played for East Stirlingshire, Aberdeen, Albion Rovers and Stranraer in the Scottish Football League and Barnsley in the Football League.

In the summer of 1963, he played in the Eastern Canada Professional Soccer League with Toronto City.
