= Lewis Thom =

Scottish footballer (1944–2019)

Personal information
- Full name: Lewis McDonald Thom
- Date of birth: 10 April 1944
- Place of birth: Stornoway, Scotland
- Date of death: 28 June 2019 (aged 75)
- Place of death: Aberdeen, Scotland
- Position: Left winger

Senior career*
Years	Team	Apps	(Gls)
1961–1964	Aberdeen	35	(5)
1964–1965	Dundee United	11	(2)
1965–1966	Shrewsbury Town	49	(5)
1966–1969	Lincoln City	47	(4)
1969–1970	Bradford Park Avenue	31	(1)
1970	Altrincham		
1970–1973	Elgin City		
- * Club domestic league appearances and goals

Lewis McDonald Thom (10 April 1944 – 28 June 2019) was a Scottish footballer who played as a left winger.

== Career ==
Thom began his professional career in 1961 with Aberdeen and made thirty-five league appearances for the Dons during his three years at Pittodrie. In 1964, Thom moved to Dundee United but left within a year to join Shrewsbury Town, after making less than a dozen league appearances. Thom was a regular during his short time with Shrewsbury and played nearly fifty league games before moving to Lincoln City in 1966, where he remained for three seasons. Thom wrapped up his career with periods at Bradford Park Avenue, Altrincham F.C, and Elgin City, then a Scottish Highland Football League Club, in the early 1970s. Lewis's brother, Hugh, was also a successful footballer in the Highland League with Elgin City.

== After football ==
Thom pursued amateur golfing after retiring from football. However, he lost one of his legs in an offshore oil industry accident, which ending his golfing career early. He died in Aberdeen on 28 June 2019.
