= 1946–47 Scottish Cup =

Tournament details
- Country: Scotland

Final positions
- Champions: Aberdeen
- Runners-up: Hibernian

The 1946–47 Scottish Cup was the 62nd staging of Scotland's most prestigious football knockout competition, and the first edition to be completed since 1938-39 as all major football competitions in the country were halted by World War II. The Cup was won for the first time by Aberdeen, who defeated Hibernian in the final.

== First round ==
Home team	Score	Away team
Aberdeen	2 – 1	Partick Thistle
Albion Rovers	3 – 0	Airdrieonians
Alloa Athletic	0 – 8	Hibernian
Arbroath	2 – 2	Stenhousemuir
Clachnacuddin	1 – 1	East Stirlingshire
Dundee	2 – 1	Celtic
East Fife	6 – 2	Dunfermline Athletic
Falkirk	2 – 0	Kilmarnock
Hamilton Academical	1 – 1	Third Lanark
Hearts	3 – 0	St Johnstone
Greenock Morton	4 – 0	Edinburgh City
Motherwell	3 – 0	Forfar Athletic
Peterhead	1 – 5	Ayr United
Queen of the South	3 – 4	Raith Rovers
Queen's Park	3 – 0	Dundee United
Rangers	2 – 1	Clyde
St Mirren	2 – 3	Dumbarton
Stranraer	0 – 5	Cowdenbeath

=== Replays ===
Home team	Score	Away team
East Stirlingshire	5 – 1	Clachnacuddin
Stenhousemuir	0 – 2	Arbroath
Third Lanark	2 – 1	Hamilton Academical

== Second round ==
Home team	Score	Away team
East Fife	5 – 1	East Stirlingshire
Aberdeen	8 – 0	Ayr United

== Third round ==
Home team	Score	Away team
Hearts	2 – 1	Cowdenbeath
Aberdeen	1 – 1	Greenock Morton
Arbroath	5 – 4	Raith Rovers
Dumbarton	2 – 0	Third Lanark
Dundee	3 – 0	Albion Rovers
East Fife	3 – 1	Queen's Park
Falkirk	0 – 0	Motherwell
Rangers	0 – 0	Hibernian

=== Replays ===
Home team	Score	Away team
Hibernian	2 – 0	Rangers
Greenock Morton	1 – 2	Aberdeen
Motherwell	1 – 0	Falkirk

== Quarter-finals ==
Home team	Score	Away team
Dundee	1 – 2	Aberdeen
Arbroath	2 – 1	Hearts
East Fife	0 – 2	Motherwell
Hibernian	2 – 0	Dumbarton

== Semi-finals ==
29 March 1947

Hibernian	2–1 (a.e.t.)	Motherwell
Eddie Turnbull 18'; Hugh Howie 141'		Willie Kilmarnock 57'

Hampden Park, Glasgow
Attendance: 48,000

12 April 1947

Arbroath	0–2	Aberdeen
		Stan Williams 43' 70'

Dens Park, Dundee
Attendance: 22,000
Referee: M.C. Dale

== Final ==
19 April 1947

Aberdeen	2–1	Hibernian
Hamilton 36'; Williams 42'	Soccerbase	Cuthbertson 1'

Hampden Park, Glasgow
Attendance: 82,140
Referee: Robert Calder

=== Teams ===
ABERDEEN:
GK	(Scotland) George Johnstone
RB	(Scotland) Pat McKenna
LB	(Scotland) George Taylor
RH	(Scotland) Joe McLaughlin
CH	(Scotland) Frank Dunlop
LH	(Scotland) Willie Waddell
RW	(Scotland) Tony Harris
IR	(Scotland) George Hamilton
CF	(South Africa) Stan Williams
IL	(Scotland) Archie Baird
LW	(Scotland) Willie McCall
Manager:
(Scotland) Dave Halliday

HIBERNIAN:
GK	(Scotland) Jimmy Kerr
RB	(Scotland) Jock Govan
LB	(Scotland) Davie Shaw
RH	(Scotland) Hugh Howie
CH	(Scotland) Peter Aird
LH	(Scotland) Sammy Kean
RW	(Scotland) Gordon Smith
IR	(Scotland) Willie Finnigan
CF	(Scotland) John Cuthbertson
IL	(Scotland) Eddie Turnbull
LW	(Scotland) Willie Ormond
Manager:
(Scotland) Willie McCartney

== See also ==
- 1946–47 in Scottish football
- 1946–47 Scottish League Cup
