= 1947 Scottish Cup final =

1947 Scottish Cup Final
- Event: 1946–47 Scottish Cup
Aberdeen	Hibernian
2	1
- Date: 19 April 1947
- Venue: Hampden Park, Glasgow
- Referee: Bobby Calder
- Attendance: 82,140

The 1947 Scottish Cup Final was played on 19 April 1947, at Hampden Park in Glasgow. The match was contested by Aberdeen and Hibernian, with Aberdeen winning 2–1. This was Aberdeen's first Scottish Cup victory.

== Match details ==
19 April 1947
15:00 BST

Aberdeen	2 – 1	Hibernian
Hamilton 36'; Williams 42'	Report (Page 2)	Cuthbertson 1'

Hampden Park
Glasgow
Attendance: 82,140

Aberdeen:
GK	1	George Johnstone
DF	2	Pat McKenna
DF	3	George Taylor
MF	4	Joe McLaughlin
MF	5	Frank Dunlop (c)
MF	6	Willie Waddell
FW	7	Tony Harris
FW	8	George Hamilton
FW	9	Stan Williams
FW	10	Archie Baird
FW	11	Willie McCall
Manager:
Dave Halliday

Hibernian:
GK	1	Jimmy Kerr
DF	2	Jock Govan
DF	3	Davie Shaw
MF	4	Hugh Howie
MF	5	Peter Aird
MF	6	Sammy Kean
FW	7	Gordon Smith
FW	8	Willie Finnigan
FW	9	Jock Cuthbertson
FW	10	Eddie Turnbull
FW	11	Willie Ormond
Manager:
Willie McCartney

Referee:
Bobby Calder
