= 1945–46 Aberdeen F.C. season =

Aberdeen F.C.
1945–46 season
- Manager: Dave Halliday
- Southern League: 3rd
- Southern League Cup: Winners
- Victory Cup: 3rd Round
- Top goalscorer: League: Stan Williams (17); All: Stan Williams (26)
- Highest home attendance: 30,000 vs. Rangers, 12 January
- Lowest home attendance: 10,000 vs. Queen's Park, 25 December
Home colours

== Results ==
=== Division A ===
Match Day	Date	Opponent	H/A	Score	Aberdeen Scorer(s)	Attendance
1	11 August	Third Lanark	H	3–0	Miller (2), Pattillo	15,000
2	18 August	Kilmarnock	A	4–1	Williams (2), Bremner, Miller	14,000
3	25 August	St Mirren	H	6–1	Williams (3), Pattillo, Miller, Dyer (penalty)	0
4	1 September	Celtic	A	1–1	Pattillo	26,000
5	8 September	Falkirk	H	2–0	Pattillo (2)	0
6	15 September	Hibernian	A	1–1	Taylor (penalty)	26,000
7	22 September	Motherwell	H	4–1	Armstrong (2), Baird, Kiddie	17,000
8	29 September	Partick Thistle	A	1–1	Pattillo	31,000
9	13 October	Rangers	A	1–3	Armstrong	65,000
10	20 October	Clyde	H	1–2	Baird	15,000
11	27 October	Queen of the South	A	2–3	Driver, Pattillo	0
12	3 November	Morton	H	3–1	Driver (2), Armstrong	15,000
13	10 November	Heart of Midlothian	A	2–1	Pattillo, Williams	20,000
14	17 November	Hamilton Academical	H	4–0	Armstrong (2), Williams, Pattillo	14,000
15	24 November	Third Lanark	A	1–3	Pattillo	0
16	1 December	Kilmarnock	H	2–0	Armstrong (2)	14,000
17	8 December	St Mirren	A	1–4	Williams	0
18	15 December	Celtic	H	1–1	Bremner	21,000
19	22 December	Hibernian	H	2–0	Green, Taylor	0
20	25 December	Queen's Park	H	1–3	Pattillo	10,000
21	29 December	Motherwell	A	3–1	Williams (2), Dunlop	0
22	1 January	Falkirk	A	1–3	Pattillo	5,000
23	2 January	Partcik Thistle	H	3–0	Williams (2), Baird	0
24	5 January	Queen's Park	H	5–0	Pattillo (2), Hamilton, Baird, Williams	19,000
25	12 January	Rangers	H	4–1	Taylor, Williams, Green, Baird	30,000
26	19 January	Clyde	A	0–0		14,000
27	26 January	Queen of the South	H	7–1	Hamilton (2), Williams, McCall (2), Baird	0
28	2 February	Morton	A	2–3	Baird, Williams	4,000
29	9 February	Heart of Midlothian	H	2–1	Baird (2)	0
30	16 February	Hamilton Academical	A	3–3	Hamilton, Kiddie, McCall	3,000

==== Final standings ====
Pos	Team	Pld	W	D	L	GF	GA	GD	Pts
1	Rangers (C)	30	22	4	4	85	41	+44	48
2	Hibernian	30	17	6	7	67	37	+30	40
3	Aberdeen	30	16	6	8	73	41	+32	38
4	Celtic	30	12	11	7	55	44	+11	35
5	Clyde	30	11	9	10	64	54	+10	31

(C) Champions

=== Southern League Cup ===
==== Group Section 1 ====
Round	Date	Opponent	H/A	Score	Aberdeen Scorer(s)	Attendance
1	23 February	Kilmarnock	A	1–1	Williams	16,000
2	2 March	Hibernian	H	4–1	Baird (2), Kiddie, Williams	18,000
3	9 March	Partick Thistle	H	2–1	Hamilton (2)	14,000
4	16 March	Kilmarnock	H	1–0	Williams	15,000
5	23 March	Hibernian	A	2–3	Baird, Cowie	35,000
6	30 March	Partick Thistle	A	0–0		20,000

==== Section 1 final table ====
Team	Pld	W	D	L	GF	GA	GD	Pts
Aberdeen	6	4	0	2	21	13	+8	8
Hibernian	6	4	0	2	10	7	+3	8
Partick Thistle	6	1	2	3	6	6	0	4
Kilmarnock	6	1	2	3	4	11	−7	4

==== Knockout stage ====
Round	Date	Opponent	H/A	Score	Aberdeen Scorer(s)	Attendance
QF	6 April	Ayr United	N	2–0	Williams, Hamilton	17,500
SF	27 April	Airdrieonians	N	2–2	Baird, Hamilton	20,000
SF R	30 April	Airdrieonians	N	5–3	Kiddie (2), Strauss, Williams, Baird (penalty)	45,000
F	11 May	Rangers	N	3–2	Baird, Williams, Taylor	135,000

=== Victory Cup ===
Round	Date	Opponent	H/A	Score	Aberdeen Scorer(s)	Attendance
R1 L1	20 April	Hamilton Academical	H	2–0	Wallbanks (2)	14,000
R1 L2	24 April	Hamilton Academical	A	2–0	Baird, Williams	9,000
R2 L1	4 May	Kilmarnock	H	1–1	Hamilton	15,000
R2 L2	13 May	Kilmarnock	A	3–0	Wallbanks (2), Baird	20,000
R3	18 May	Clyde	A	2–4	Hamilton, Williams	0

== Squad ==
=== Unofficial Appearances & Goals ===
No.	Pos	Nat	Player	Total		Southern League		Southern League Cup		Victory Cup	
No.	Pos	Nat	Player	Apps	Goals	Apps	Goals	Apps	Goals	Apps	Goals
	GK	(Scotland) SCO	George Johnstone	29	0	17	0	7	0	5	0
	GK	(Scotland) SCO	Roy Henderson	14	0	11	0	3	0	0	0
	GK	(South Africa) SOU	Pat Kelly	2	0	2	0	0	0	0	0
	DF	(Scotland) SCO	Frank Dunlop	45	1	30	1	10	0	5	0
	DF	(Scotland) SCO	Pat McKenna	41	0	26	0	10	0	5	0
	DF	(Scotland) SCO	Willie Cooper (c)	27	0	17	0	5	0	5	0
	DF	(Scotland) SCO	Andy Cowie	23	1	13	0	7	1	3	0
	DF	(Scotland) SCO	Willie Waddell	8	0	1	0	4	0	3	0
	DF	(England) ENG	Alex Dyer	4	1	4	1	0	0	0	0
	MF	(Scotland) SCO	George Taylor	42	4	29	3	9	1	4	0
	MF	(Scotland) SCO	Willie McCall	31	3	17	3	10	0	4	0
	MF	(Scotland) SCO	Alex Kiddie	29	5	18	2	8	3	3	0
	MF	(England) ENG	George Green	14	2	14	2	0	0	0	0
	MF	(South Africa) SOU	Bill Strauss	6	1	1	0	4	1	1	0
	MF	??	John Miller	4	4	4	4	0	0	0	0
	MF	(Scotland) SCO	Jock Thomson	2	0	2	0	0	0	0	0
	MF	(Scotland) SCO	Willie Hume	1	0	0	0	0	0	1	0
	MF	??	John Cruickshank	0	0	0	0	0	0	0	0
	FW	(South Africa) SOU	Stan Williams	43	26	28	17	10	6	5	3
	FW	(Scotland) SCO	Archie Baird	39	17	26	9	9	6	4	2
	FW	(Scotland) SCO	Jock Pattillo	30	14	25	14	4	0	1	0
	FW	(Scotland) SCO	George Hamilton	20	10	8	4	8	4	4	2
	FW	(Scotland) SCO	Hutton Bremner	20	2	19	2	1	0	0	0
	FW	(Scotland) SCO	Matt Armstrong	13	8	13	8	0	0	0	0
	FW	(England) ENG	Allenby Driver	5	3	5	3	0	0	0	0
	FW	(England) ENG	Horace Wallbanks	3	3	0	0	1	0	2	3
	FW	??	Neil Hammond	0	0	0	0	0	0	0	0
	??	??	William Spalding	0	0	0	0	0	0	0	0
