= 1947 Scottish League Cup final (April) =

- Event: 1946–47 Scottish League Cup
Rangers	Aberdeen
4	0
- Date: 5 April 1947
- Venue: Hampden Park, Glasgow
- Referee: Bobby Calder
- Attendance: 82,700

The 1946–47 Scottish League Cup final was played on 5 April 1947, at Hampden Park in Glasgow and was the final of the first official Scottish League Cup competition. The final was contested by Rangers and Aberdeen. Rangers won the match 4–0 thanks to goals by Jimmy Duncanson (2), Torrance Gillick and Billy Williamson.

== Match details ==
5 April 1947

Rangers	4–0	Aberdeen
Duncanson; Gillick; Williamson

Hampden Park, Glasgow
Attendance: 82,700

RANGERS :
GK	Bobby Brown
FB	George Young
FB	Jock Shaw (c)
RH	Ian McColl
CH	Willie Woodburn
LH	Willie Rae
RW	Eddie Rutherford
IF	Torrance Gillick
CF	Billy Williamson
IF	Willie Thornton
LW	Jimmy Duncanson
Manager:
Bill Struth

ABERDEEN :
GK	George Johnstone
FB	Willie Cooper
FB	Pat McKenna
RH	Joe McLaughlin
CH	Frank Dunlop (c)
LH	George Taylor
RW	Tony Harris
IF	George Hamilton
CF	Stan Williams
IF	Archie Baird
LW	Willie McCall
Manager:
Dave Halliday
