= List of Aberdeen F.C. records and statistics =

Aberdeen Football Club are a Scottish professional association football club based in Aberdeen. They have played at their home ground, Pittodrie, since the club's formation in 1903. Aberdeen joined the Scottish Football League in 1904, and the Scottish Premier League in 1998 as well as the Scottish Professional Football League in 2013.

The club's record appearance maker is Willie Miller, who made 796 appearances between 1972 and 1990. Joe Harper is the club's record goalscorer, scoring 199 goals in major competitions during his two spells at Aberdeen.

This list encompasses the major honours won by Aberdeen, records set by the club, their managers and their players. The player records section includes details of the club's leading goalscorers and those who have made most appearances in first-team competitions. It also records notable achievements by Aberdeen players on the international stage, and the highest transfer fees paid and received by the club. Attendance records at Pittodrie are also included in the list.

== Honours ==
Aberdeen's first trophy was the Southern League Cup in 1946, which was won after a 3–2 win against Rangers. Their first national trophy win was the Scottish Cup in 1947. Aberdeen's first Scottish League Cup victory came in 1955.

In 1983, Aberdeen won two European trophies, the European Cup Winners' Cup and the European Super Cup. The 1980s was Aberdeen's most successful in terms of trophies won, with three league championships, four Scottish Cups and two Scottish League Cups added to the two European trophies. Aberdeen's most recent trophy win was in 2025, when they defeated Celtic on penalties in the Scottish Cup final.

=== National ===
==== League ====
- Scottish Top Tier: (4)
  - Scottish First Division – 1954–55
  - Scottish Premier Division – 1979–80, 1983–84, 1984–85
    - Runners-up (17): 1910–11, 1936–37, 1955–56, 1970–71, 1971–72, 1977–78, 1980–81, 1981–82, 1988–89, 1989–90, 1990–91, 1992–93, 1993–94, 2014–15, 2015–16, 2016–17, 2017–18

==== Scottish Cup ====
- Winners: (8)
  - 1946–47, 1969–70, 1981–82, 1982–83, 1983–84, 1985–86, 1989–90, 2024–25
  - Runners-up (9): 1936–37, 1952–53, 1953–54, 1958–59, 1966–67, 1977–78, 1992–93, 1999–00, 2016–17

==== Scottish League Cup ====
- Winners: (6)
  - 1955–56, 1976–77, 1985–86, 1989–90, 1995–96, 2013–14
  - Runners-up (10): 1946–47, 1978–79, 1979–80, 1987–88, 1988–89, 1992–93, 1999–00, 2016–17, 2018–19, 2023–24

=== European ===
- UEFA Cup Winners' Cup: 1
  - 1982–83
    - Semi-final: 1983–84
- UEFA Super Cup: 1
  - 1983

1986 European Cup Quarter Final

=== Regional ===
- Aberdeenshire Cup (36): 1903–04, 1904–05, 1906–07, 1907–08, 1908–09, 1909–10, 1911–12, 1912–13, 1913–14, 1914–15, 1919–20, 1921–22, 1922–23, 1923–24, 1924–25, 1925–26, 1926–27, 1927–28, 1928–29, 1929–30, 1930–31, 1931–32, 1932–33, 1933–34, 1980–81, 1981–82, 1982–83, 1987–88, 1989–90, 1990–91, 1992–93, 1997–98, 2002–03, 2003–04, 2004–05, 2025–26
- Aberdeenshire and District League (7): 1919–20, 1920–21, 1925–26, 1926–27, 1927–28, 1928–29, 1947–48
- Dewar Shield (17): 1906–07, 1908–09, 1912–13, 1914–15, 1926–27, 1928–29, 1930–31, 1931–32, 1932–33, 1933–34, 1935–36, 1936–37, 1939–40, 1945–46, 1949–50, 1950–51 (shared), 1951-52 (shared)
- Fleming Charity Shield (13): 1903–04, 1904–05, 1905–06, 1906–07, 1907–08, 1908–09, 1909–10, 1910–11, 1911–12, 1912–13, 1913–14, 1921–22, 1922–23
- High Cup: 1907–08
- Highland League: 1912–13, 1924–25 (won by Aberdeen A)
- Northern League: 1905–06, 1910–11 (won by Aberdeen A)
- Rhodesia Cup: 1904–05
- Robertson Cup: 1910–11 (shared), 1915–16 (shared)
- Caledonia Trophy: 1947–48, 1948–49, 1949–50

=== Wartime ===
- North Eastern League (4): 1942–43 (winter), 1942–43 (spring), 1943–44 (spring), 1944–45 (spring)
- North Eastern League Cup/Mitchell Cup (5): 1941–42 (winter), 1942–43 (winter), 1942–43 (spring), 1944–45 (winter), 1944–45 (spring)
- Southern League Cup: 1945–46

=== Other cups ===
- Drybrough Cup: 1971–72, 1980–81
- Summer Cup: Runners-up 1963–64

=== Youth ===
- Scottish Youth League: 1998–99, 2014–15
- Scottish Youth Cup: 1984–85, 1985–86, 2000–01

== Player records ==
=== Appearances ===
- Most appearances in all major competitions: Willie Miller, 796
- Most League appearances: Willie Miller, 560
- Most Scottish Cup appearances: Alex McLeish, 68
- Most League Cup appearances: Willie Miller, 109
- Most European appearances: Willie Miller, 61
- Youngest first-team player: Dean Campbell, 16 years, 51 days (against Celtic on 12 May 2017)

=== Top 50 most appearances ===
Competitive, professional matches only, up to the end of the 2025/26 season.

| # | Name | Years | League | Scottish Cup | League Cup | Europe | Total |
|---|---|---|---|---|---|---|---|
| 1 | (Scotland) Willie Miller | 1972-1990 | 560 | 66 | 109 | 61 | 796 |
| 2 | (Scotland) Alex McLeish | 1978-1994 | 491 | 68 | 74 | 56 | 689 |
| 3 | (Scotland) Bobby Clark | 1965-1980 | 424 | 49 | 95 | 23 | 591 |
| 4 | (Scotland) Andrew Considine | 2004-2022 | 444 | 49 | 34 | 44 | 571 |
| 5 | (Scotland) Stewart McKimmie | 1983-1997 | 430 | 46 | 47 | 39 | 562 |
| 6 | (Scotland) Jim Leighton | 1978-1988; 1998-2000 | 383 | 49 | 54 | 47 | 533 |
| 7 | (Scotland) Russell Anderson | 1996-2006; 2012-2015 | 343 | 30 | 25 | 9 | 407 |
| 8 | (Scotland) Drew Jarvie | 1972-1982 | 275 | 28 | 66 | 17 | 386 |
| 9 | (Scotland) Brian Irvine | 1985-1997 | 309 | 29 | 26 | 21 | 385 |
| 10 | (Scotland) Eoin Jess | 1989-1996; 1997-2001 | 312 | 23 | 34 | 11 | 380 |
| 11 | (Scotland) Willie Cooper | 1928-1939; 1945-1948 | 331 (Note: source has 348 but this includes 17 unofficial wartime league appearances in 1945/46.) | 37 | 9 | 0 | 377 |
| 12 | (Scotland) Darren Mackie | 1998-2012 | 314 | 22 | 19 | 10 | 365 |
| 13 | (Scotland) John Hewitt | 1979-1989 | 241 | 33 | 46 | 43 | 363 |
| 14= | (Scotland) Bert MacLachlan | 1914-1927 | 315 | 43 | 0 | 0 | 358 |
| 14= | (Northern Ireland) Niall McGinn | 2012-2017; 2018-2022 | 279 | 32 | 20 | 27 | 358 |
| 16 | (Republic of Ireland) Jonny Hayes | 2012-2017; 2020-2024 | 278 | 18 | 23 | 33 | 352 |
| 17 | (England) Jack Hather | 1948-1960 | 264 | 34 | 53 | 0 | 351 |
| 18 | (Scotland) Donald Colman | 1907-1917; 1919-1920 | 323 | 23 | 0 | 0 | 346 |
| 19 | (Scotland) Davie Robb | 1966-1977 | 251 | 27 | 51 | 16 | 345 |
| 20 | (Scotland) Graeme Shinnie | 2015-2019; 2023-2026 | 261 | 26 | 25 | 32 | 344 |
| 21 | (Scotland) Jim Bett | 1985-1994 | 257 | 28 | 32 | 21 | 338 |
| 22= | (Scotland) Jimmy Smith | 1922-1931 | 297 | 39 | 0 | 0 | 336 |
| 22= | (Scotland) Jamie Langfield | 2005-2015 | 278 | 26 | 16 | 16 | 336 |
| 24 | (Scotland) Stuart Kennedy | 1976-1983 | 223 | 29 | 55 | 26 | 333 |
| 25 | (Scotland) Brian Grant | 1984-1997 | 265 | 27 | 25 | 15 | 332 |
| 26 | (Scotland) John McMaster | 1974-1987 | 204 | 29 | 54 | 28 | 315 |
| 27 | (Scotland) Neil Simpson | 1978-1990 | 205 | 34 | 34 | 37 | 310 |
| 28 | (Scotland) Billy Little | 1957-1969 | 237 | 23 | 45 | 1 | 306 |
| 29 | (Scotland) Jock Hume | 1907-1917; 1919-1920 | 282 | 23 | 0 | 0 | 305 |
| 30= | (Scotland) Ally Shewan | 1961-1969 | 220 | 26 | 46 | 8 | 300 |
| 30= | (Scotland) Joe Harper | 1969-1973; 1976-1981 | 207 | 24 | 53 | 16 | 300 |
| 32 | (Scotland) Arthur Graham | 1969-1977 | 220 | 22 | 44 | 11 | 297 |
| 33 | (England) Shay Logan | 2014-2021 | 224 | 21 | 17 | 32 | 294 |
| 34 | (Scotland) Fred Martin | 1949-1960 | 208 | 33 | 52 | 0 | 293 |
| 35 | (Scotland) Gordon Strachan | 1977-1984 | 183 | 29 | 46 | 34 | 292 |
| 36 | (Netherlands) Theo Snelders | 1988-1996 | 228 | 20 | 29 | 14 | 291 |
| 37 | (Scotland) George Hamilton | 1938-1939; 1945-1955 | 204 (Note: source has 212 but this includes 8 unofficial wartime league appearances in 1945/46.) | 32 | 48 | 0 | 284 |
| 38= | (Scotland) Jock Hutton | 1919-1927 | 239 | 41 | 0 | 0 | 280 |
| 38= | (Scotland) Doug Rougvie | 1975-1984 | 181 | 26 | 45 | 28 | 280 |
| 40 | (Scotland) Jimmy Hogg | 1955-1965 | 214 | 22 | 43 | 0 | 279 |
| 41= | (Scotland) Harry Yorston | 1947-1957 | 202 | 29 | 47 | 0 | 278 |
| 41= | (Scotland) Chris Clark | 1999-2008; 2011-2013 | 233 | 22 | 14 | 9 | 278 |
| 43 | (Scotland) Richard Foster | 2003-2012 | 235 | 19 | 11 | 9 | 274 |
| 44= | (Scotland) Bob McDermid | 1925-1933 | 246 | 27 | 0 | 0 | 273 |
| 44= | (Scotland) Tony Harris | 1946-1954 | 188 | 31 | 54 | 0 | 273 |
| 46 | (England) Joe Lewis | 2016-2023 | 208 | 22 | 14 | 27 | 271 |
| 47= | (Scotland) Archie Glen | 1948-1960 | 203 | 24 | 43 | 0 | 270 |
| 47= | (Scotland) Jim Hermiston | 1966-1975 | 195 | 15 | 45 | 15 | 270 |
| 49 | (Scotland) Joe Miller | 1984-1988; 1993-1998 | 206 | 20 | 24 | 14 | 264 |
| 50 | (Scotland) Robert Connor | 1986-1994 | 206 | 17 | 22 | 17 | 262 |

=== Top 10 non-UK appearances ===
Competitive, professional matches only, up to the end of the 2025/26 season.

| # (non UK) | # (Exc ROI) | Name | Years | League | Scottish Cup | League Cup | Europe | Total |
|---|---|---|---|---|---|---|---|---|
| 1 | x | (Republic of Ireland) Jonny Hayes | 2012-2017; 2020-2024 | 278 | 18 | 23 | 33 | 352 |
| 2 | 1 | (Netherlands) Theo Snelders | 1988-1996 | 228 | 20 | 29 | 14 | 291 |
| 3 | x | (Republic of Ireland) Eddie Falloon | 1927-1938 | 223 | 26 | 0 | 0 | 249 |
| 4 | 2 | (Denmark) Jens Petersen | 1964-1970 | 141 | 22 | 31 | 7 | 201 |
| 5 | x | (Republic of Ireland) Adam Rooney | 2013-2018 | 151 | 15 | 11 | 20 | 197 |
| 6 | 3 | (Denmark) Henning Boel | 1968-1974 | 105 | 17 | 22 | 6 | 150 |
| 7 | 4 | (Nigeria) Sone Aluko | 2007-2011 | 102 | 14 | 4 | 7 | 127 |
| 8 | 5 | (Cape Verde) Luis Lopes | 2022-2025 | 90 | 6 | 9 | 8 | 113 |
| 9 | x | (Republic of Ireland) Charles O'Hagan | 1906-1910 | 99 | 13 | 0 | 0 | 112 |
| 10 | x | (Republic of Ireland) Willo Flood | 2013-2016 | 80 | 4 | 7 | 13 | 104 |
| 11 | 6 | (Netherlands) Hans Gillhaus | 1989-1992 | 84 | 6 | 5 | 5 | 100 |
| 12= | 7= | (South Africa) Stan Williams | 1937-1939; 1945-1949 | 72 | 10 | 17 | 0 | 99 (Note: source lists 127 appearances, but 28 were unofficial wartime league fixtures in 1945/46.) |
| 12= | 7= | (South Africa) Bill Strauss | 1936-1939; 1945-1946 | 85 | 14 | 0 | 0 | 99 (Note: source lists 100 appearances, but 1 was an unofficial wartime league fixture in 1945/46.) |
| 14 | 9 | (North Macedonia) Bojan Miovski | 2022-2024 | 77 | 5 | 9 | 7 | 98 |
| 15= | 10= | (Finland) Mixu Paatelainen | 1992-1994 | 75 | 9 | 6 | 3 | 93 |
| 15= | 10= | (United States) Dante Polvara | 2022-2026 | 65 | 8 | 7 | 13 | 93 |

=== Goalscorers ===
- Most goals scored: Joe Harper, 199
- Most goals scored in League: Joe Harper, 125
- Most goals scored in Scottish Cup: Benny Yorston, 23
- Most goals scored in Scottish League Cup:Joe Harper, 51
- Most goals scored in Europe: Mark McGhee, 14
- Most goals scored in a season: Benny Yorston, 46, 1929–30
- Most league goals in a season: Benny Yorston, 38, 1929–30

=== Top 50 goalscorers ===
Competitive, professional matches only, up to the end of the 2025/26 season. Matches played appear in brackets.

| # | Name | Years | League | Scottish Cup | League Cup | Europe | Total |
|---|---|---|---|---|---|---|---|
| 1 | (Scotland) Joe Harper | 1969-1972; 1976-1980 | 125 (207) | 15 (24) | 51 (53) | 8 (16) | 199 (300) |
| 2 | (Scotland) Matt Armstrong | 1931-1939; 1945-1946 | 137 (195) (Note: source has 145 in 208, but 8 were scored in 13 unofficial wartime league fixtures in 1945–46.) | 19 (24) | 0 (0) | 0 (0) | 156 (219) |
| 3 | (Scotland) George Hamilton | 1938-1939; 1945-1955 | 104 (204) (Note: source has 108 in 212, but 4 were scored in 8 unofficial wartime league fixtures in 1945/46.) | 18 (32) | 33 (48) | 0 (0) | 155 (284) |
| 4 | (Scotland) Harry Yorston | 1947-1957 | 98 (202) | 21 (29) | 22 (47) | 0 (0) | 141 (278) |
| 5 | (Scotland) Drew Jarvie | 1972-1982 | 86 (275) | 6 (28) | 29 (66) | 10 (17) | 131 (386) |
| 6 | (Scotland) Benny Yorston | 1927-1931 | 101 (143) | 23 (13) | 0 (0) | 0 (0) | 124 (156) |
| 7 | (Scotland) Willie Mills | 1932-1937 | 102 (182) | 12 (28) | 0 (0) | 0 (0) | 114 (210) |
| 8 | (England) Jack Hather | 1948-1960 | 79 (264) | 10 (34) | 16 (53) | 0 (0) | 105 (351) |
| 9 | (Scotland) Mark McGhee | 1979-1984 | 61 (164) | 7 (20) | 18 (34) | 14 (31) | 100 (249) |
| 10= | (Scotland) Billy Little | 1957-1969 | 78 (237) | 8 (23) | 12 (45) | 0 (1) | 98 (306) |
| 10= | (Scotland) Davie Robb | 1966-1977 | 77 (251) | 10 (27) | 9 (51) | 2 (16) | 98 (345) |
| 12 | (Scotland) Eoin Jess | 1988-1996; 1997-2001 | 79 (312) | 4 (23) | 5 (34) | 6 (11) | 94 (380) |
| 13= | (Scotland) Ernie Winchester | 1961-1967 | 71 (123) | 9 (15) | 12 (30) | 0 (0) | 92 (168) |
| 13= | (Scotland) Graham Leggat | 1953-1958 | 64 (109) | 7 (16) | 21 (26) | 0 (0) | 92 (151) |
| 13= | (Scotland) Paddy Buckley | 1951-1957 | 58 (107) | 16 (20) | 18 (26) | 0 (0) | 92 (153) |
| 16= | (Scotland) Gordon Strachan | 1977-1984 | 54 (183) | 7 (29) | 20 (46) | 8 (34) | 89 (292) |
| 16= | (Scotland) John Hewitt | 1979-1989 | 54 (241) | 8 (33) | 15 (46) | 12 (43) | 89 (363) |
| 18 | (Republic of Ireland) Adam Rooney | 2013-2018 | 66 (151) | 6 (15) | 7 (11) | 9 (20) | 88 (197) |
| 19 | (Northern Ireland) Niall McGinn | 2012-2017; 2018-2022 | 71 (279) | 8 (32) | 2 (20) | 6 (27) | 87 (358) |
| 20 | (Scotland) Norrie Davidson | 1955-1961 | 55 (109) | 13 (14) | 16 (23) | 0 (0) | 84 (146) |
| 21 | (Scotland) Andy Love | 1925-1934 | 79 (216) | 4 (22) | 0 (0) | 0 (0) | 83 (238) |
| 22 | (Scotland) Duncan Shearer | 1992-1998 | 55 (152) | 8 (18) | 14 (15) | 2 (9) | 79 (194) |
| 23= | (Scotland) Eric Black | 1980-1986 | 46 (115) | 5 (25) | 12 (18) | 7 (22) | 70 (180) |
| 23= | (Scotland) Scott Booth | 1989-1997; 2003-2004 | 51 (184) | 9 (20) | 10 (17) | 0 (8) | 70 (229) |
| 25 | (Scotland) Darren Mackie | 1998-2012 | 57 (314) | 6 (22) | 3 (19) | 2 (10) | 68 (365) |
| 26 | (Scotland) Billy Dodds | 1994-1999 | 47 (139) | 1 (9) | 15 (16) | 4 (8) | 67 (172) |
| 27 | (Scotland) Willie Lennie | 1905-1913 | 61 (228) | 5 (24) | 0 (0) | 0 (0) | 66 (252) |
| 28 | (Scotland) Jimmy Smith | 1922-1931 | 54 (297) | 10 (39) | 0 (0) | 0 (0) | 64 (336) |
| 29= | (Scotland) Bobby Wishart | 1953-1961 | 45 (177) | 7 (22) | 10 (36) | 0 (0) | 62 (235) |
| 29= | (Scotland) Jim Forrest | 1968-1973 | 44 (128) | 8 (20) | 8 (27) | 2 (11) | 62 (186) |
| 31 | (Scotland) John Miller | 1921-1925; 1926-1927 | 54 (109) | 7 (15) | 0 (0) | 0 (0) | 61 (124) |
| 32 | (Scotland) Billy Stark | 1983-1987 | 41 (112) | 7 (12) | 11(14) | 1 (11) | 60 (149) |
| 33 | (Scotland) Davie Main | 1911-1917 | 54 (155) | 4 (8) | 0 (0) | 0 (0) | 58 (163) |
| 34= | (Scotland) Alec Cheyne | 1926-1930 | 49 (126) | 7 (11) | 0 (0) | 0 (0) | 56 (137) |
| 34= | (South Africa) Bill Strauss | 1936-1946 | 45 (85) | 11 (14) | 0 (0) | 0 (0) | 56 (99) |
| 36= | (Scotland) Bob McDermid | 1925-1933 | 44 (246) | 5 (27) | 0 (0) | 0 (0) | 49 (273) |
| 36= | (England) Bobby Cummings | 1960-1964 | 33 (63) | 11 (7) | 5(17) | 0 (0) | 49 (87) |
| 38= | (Republic of Ireland) Paddy Moore | 1932-1935 | 45 (66) | 2 (8) | 0 (0) | 0 (0) | 47 (74) |
| 38= | (England) Sam Cosgrove | 2018-2021 | 31 (79) | 7 (11) | 3 (5) | 6 (8) | 47 (103) |
| 38= | (Scotland) Jim Bett | 1985-1994 | 33 (257) | 2 (28) | 10(32) | 2 (21) | 47 (338) |
| 38= | (Scotland) Joe Miller | 1984-1988; 1993-1998 | 32 (206) | 3 (20) | 10(24) | 2 (14) | 47 (264) |
| 38= | (Scotland) Steve Archibald | 1978-1980 | 30 (76) | 11 (10) | 6 (18) | 0 (6) | 47 (110) |
| 43 | (Scotland) Arthur Graham | 1970-1977 | 34 (220) | 1 (22) | 9 (44) | 2 (11) | 46 (297) |
| 44= | (Scotland) Robbie Winters | 1998-2002 | 41 (132) | 2 (11) | 1 (7) | 1 (2) | 45 (152) |
| 44= | (Scotland) Bobby Bruce | 1924-1928 | 36 (94) | 9 (16) | 0 (0) | 0 (0) | 45 (110) |
| 46= | (Scotland) Frank McDougall | 1984-1986 | 36 (54) | 3 (6) | 4 (6) | 1 (3) | 44 (69) |
| 46= | (England) Scott Vernon | 2010-2014 | 30 (128) | 5 (17) | 9 (13) | 0 (0) | 44 (158) |
| 46= | (North Macedonia) Bojan Miovski | 2022-2024 | 32 (77) | 4 (5) | 4 (9) | 4 (7) | 44 (98) |
| 49 | (Scotland) George Mulhall | 1955-1963 | 30 (110) | 2 (9) | 10 (31) | 0 (0) | 42 (150) |
| 50 | (Scotland) Andrew Considine | 2004-2022 | 29 (444) | 6 (49) | 4 (34) | 2 (44) | 41 (571) |

(Note: Stan Williams (1937-1939, 1945-1949) is listed with 51 goals in 127, but 17 were scored in 28 unofficial wartime league fixtures in 1945/46.) (Note: Archie Baird (1945-1953) is listed with 46 goals in 170, but 9 were scored in 26 unofficial wartime league fixtures in 1945/46.)

=== Top 10 non-UK goalscorers ===
Competitive, professional matches only, up to the end of the 2025/26 season. Matches played appear in brackets.

| # (non UK) | # (exc ROI) | Name | Years | League | Scottish Cup | League Cup | Europe | Total |
|---|---|---|---|---|---|---|---|---|
| 1 | x | (Republic of Ireland) Adam Rooney | 2013-2018 | 66 (151) | 6 (15) | 7 (11) | 9 (20) | 88 (197) |
| 2 | 1 | (South Africa) Bill Strauss | 1936-1939; 1945-1946 | 45 (85) | 11 (14) | 0 (0) | 0 (0) | 56 (99) |
| 3 | x | (Republic of Ireland) Paddy Moore | 1932-1935 | 45 (66) | 2 (8) | 0 (0) | 0 (0) | 47 (74) |
| 4 | 2 | (North Macedonia) Bojan Miovski | 2022-2024 | 32 (77) | 4 (5) | 4 (9) | 4 (7) | 44 (98) |
| 5 | x | (Republic of Ireland) Jonny Hayes | 2012-2017; 2020-2024 | 29 (278) | 1 (18) | 4 (23) | 4 (33) | 38 (352) |
| 6 | 3 | (South Africa) Stan Williams | 1937-1939; 1945-1949 | 20 (72) | 6 (10) | 8 (17) | 0 (0) | 34 (99) |
| 7 | 4 | (Netherlands) Hans Gillhaus | 1989-1992 | 27 (84) | 3 (6) | 0 (5) | 2 (5) | 32 (100) |
| 8 | 5 | (Norway) Arild Stavrum | 1999-2001 | 26 (53) | 2 (10) | 1 (3) | 0 (1) | 29 (67) |
| 9 | 6 | (Finland) Mixu Paatelainen | 1991-1994 | 23 (75) | 1 (9) | 3 (6) | 1 (3) | 28 (93) |
| 10 | 7 | (Cape Verde) Luis Lopes | 2022-2025 | 20 (90) | 2 (6) | 2 (9) | 3 (8) | 27 (113) |
| 11 | x | (Republic of Ireland) Charles O'Hagan | 1906-1910 | 22 (99) | 2 (13) | 0 (0) | 0 (0) | 24 (112) |
| 12 | 8 | (United States) Christian Ramirez | 2021-2023 | 10 (45) | 2 (2) | 3 (7) | 3 (6) | 18 (60) |
| 13 | 9 | (Netherlands) Willem van der Ark | 1988-1992 | 13 (64) | 3 (4) | 1 (5) | 0 (4) | 17 (77) |
| 14 | x | (Republic of Ireland) Jamie McGrath | 2023-2025 | 13 (59) | 1 (4) | 1 (10) | 1 (8) | 16 (81) |
| 15= | 10= | (Morocco) Hicham Zerouali | 1999-2002 | 11 (37) | 2 (5) | 0 (4) | 0 (2) | 13 (48) |
| 15= | 10= | (Nigeria) Sone Aluko | 2007-2011 | 10 (102) | 2 (14) | 0 (4) | 1 (7) | 13 (127) |

=== International caps ===
- First capped: Charlie O'Hagan for Ireland in 1907.
- First capped for Scotland: Willie Lennie in 1908
- Most caps as an Aberdeen player: Alex McLeish - 77 caps for Scotland.
- First Aberdeen player to play at a World Cup: Fred Martin (for Scotland against Austria, 16 June 1954)

== Transfers ==
Record transfer fees paid

| # | Player | From | Fee | Date | Ref |
|---|---|---|---|---|---|
| 1 | (Scotland) Paul Bernard | (England) Oldham Athletic | £1,000,000 | September 1995 | |
| 2 | (Finland) Topi Keskinen | (Finland) HJK Helsinki | £850,000 | August 2024 | |
| 2 | (Scotland) Brian O'Neil | (Scotland) Celtic F.C. | £850,000 | July 1997 | |
| 3 | (Scotland) Billy Dodds | (Scotland) St Johnstone F.C. | £800,000 | July 1994 | |
| 4 | (England) Dean Windass | (England) Hull City | £700,000 | December 1995 | |

Record transfer fees received

| # | Player | To | Fee | Date | Ref |
|---|---|---|---|---|---|
| 1 | (North Macedonia) Bojan Miovski | (Spain) Girona FC | £6.8m | August 2024 | |
| 2 | (Scotland) Calvin Ramsay | (England) Liverpool F.C. | £6.5m | June 2022 | |
| 3 | (Scotland) Scott McKenna | (England) Nottingham Forest F.C. | £4.75m | September 2020 | |
| 4 | (Scotland) Lewis Ferguson | (Italy) Bologna FC 1909 | £3m | June 2023 | |

== Club records ==
=== Matches ===
==== Firsts ====
- First match (of the reformed club): vs. Stenhousemuir, Drew 1–1, Northern League, Pittodrie, (H), 15 August 1903
- First League Match: vs. Falkirk, Lost 2–1, Scottish Division Two, Pittodrie, (H), 20 August 1904
- First Scottish Cup Match: vs. Alloa Athletic, Lost 2–1, Scottish Cup, Recreation Park, (A), 23 January 1905
- First League Cup Match: vs. Falkirk, Won 4–3, Scottish League Cup, Pittodrie, (H), 21 September 1946
- First European Match: vs. KR Reykjavík, Won 10–0, European Cup Winners' Cup, Pittodrie, (H), 6 September 1967

==== Wins ====
- Record win (all competitions):
  - 13–0 against Peterhead in Scottish Cup 3rd Round at Pittodrie on 10 February 1923
- Record League win:
  - 10–0 against Raith Rovers in Scottish Division One at Pittodrie on 13 October 1962
- Record Scottish Cup win:
  - 13–0 against Peterhead in Scottish Cup 3rd Round at Pittodrie on 10 February 1923
- Record League Cup win:
  - 9–0 against Queen of the South in Scottish League Cup Group Stages at Pittodrie on 13 September 1947
  - 9–0 against Raith Rovers in Scottish League Cup 2nd Round 1st Leg at Pittodrie on 24 August 1983
- Record European win:
  - 10–0 against KR Reykjavík in European Cup Winners' Cup 1st Round 1st Leg at Pittodrie on 6 September 1967

==== Defeats ====
- Record defeat (all competitions):
  - 0–9 against Celtic in Scottish Premier League at Celtic Park on 6 November 2010
- Record League defeat:
  - 0–9 against Celtic in Scottish Premier League at Celtic Park on 6 November 2010
- Record Scottish Cup defeat:
  - 1–6 against Rangers in Scottish Cup Semi Final at Celtic Park on 22 March 1969
- Record League Cup defeat:
  - 0–6 against Dundee in Scottish League Cup Group Stage at Dens Park on 3 September 1960
- Record European defeat:
  - 0–6 against AEK Athens in Conference League League Phase at Agia Sophia Stadium on 23 October 2025

=== Attendances ===
- Record attendance: 147,365 against Celtic, lost 2–1, 1937 Scottish Cup Final, Hampden Park, (N), 24 April 1937 (record for a club football match in Europe)
- Highest home attendance: 45,061 vs Hearts, Scottish Cup Quarter-final, 13 March 1954
- Highest average home attendance: 24,200, 1948–49 (15 matches)

== See also ==
- Aberdeen F.C. in European football
- History of Aberdeen F.C.
- List of Aberdeen F.C. seasons
