= 1945–46 Southern League Cup (Scotland) =

Scottish football tournament

The 1945–46 Southern League Cup was the sixth and final edition of the regional war-time football tournament. The North Eastern League and North Eastern League Cup had ended the previous season, teams from those competitions joined the Southern League and Southern League Cup. With the Southern League now acting effectively as a national league the competition was split into two Divisions, The league cup was therefore also split into two divisions.

Aberdeen won the tournament, defeating Rangers 3–2 in the final at Hampden Park before a crowd of 135,000. This was the last edition of the competition, but the trophy itself was used again for the 1946 Victory Cup played only a few weeks later (won by Rangers), therefore Aberdeen only possessed the cup for a short time. The same teams met in first official Scottish League Cup final the following year.

== Group stage ==
=== Division A ===
==== Group A ====
Team	Pld	W	D	L	GF	GA	GD	Pts
Heart of Midlothian	6	3	2	1	12	8	+4	8
St Mirren	6	2	2	2	6	8	−2	6
Falkirk	6	2	1	3	10	11	−1	5
Hamilton Academical	6	2	1	3	6	7	−1	5

==== Group B ====
Team	Pld	W	D	L	GF	GA	GD	Pts
Rangers	6	5	1	0	15	3	+12	11
Morton	6	3	1	2	15	7	+8	7
Motherwell	6	2	1	3	9	13	−4	5
Queen of the South	6	0	1	5	4	10	−6	1

==== Group C ====
Team	Pld	W	D	L	GF	GA	GD	Pts
Aberdeen	6	4	0	2	21	13	+8	8
Hibernian	6	4	0	2	10	7	+3	8
Partick Thistle	6	1	2	3	6	6	0	4
Kilmarnock	6	1	2	3	4	11	−7	4

==== Group D ====
Team	Pld	W	D	L	GF	GA	GD	Pts
Clyde	6	4	0	2	21	13	+8	8
Celtic	6	3	1	2	14	10	+4	7
Third Lanark	6	2	2	2	11	15	−4	6
Queen's Park	6	1	1	4	9	17	−8	3

=== Division B ===
==== Group A ====
Team	Pld	W	D	L	GF	GA	GD	Pts
East Fife	6	5	0	1	24	10	+14	10
Alloa Athletic	6	4	0	2	11	8	+3	8
Raith Rovers	6	3	0	3	15	16	−1	6
Cowdenbeath	6	0	0	6	10	26	−16	0

==== Group B ====
Team	Pld	W	D	L	GF	GA	GD	Pts
Ayr United	6	4	1	1	12	7	+5	9
Dundee United	6	4	1	1	12	7	+5	9
Stenhousemuir	6	1	2	3	8	13	−5	4
Dumbarton	6	1	0	5	7	12	−5	2

===== Play-off =====
Ayr United	1 – 0	Dundee United	Hampden Park, Glasgow

==== Group C ====
Team	Pld	W	D	L	GF	GA	GD	Pts
Airdrieonians	6	3	2	1	16	5	+11	8
St Johnstone	6	2	2	2	12	8	+4	6
Dunfermline Athletic	6	2	1	3	6	10	−4	5
Albion Rovers	6	2	1	3	6	17	−11	5

==== Group D ====
Team	Pld	W	D	L	GF	GA	GD	Pts
Dundee	4	2	1	1	11	4	+7	5
Stirling Albion	4	2	0	2	6	10	−4	4
Arbroath	4	1	1	2	6	3	+3	3

== Quarter-finals ==
Aberdeen	2 – 0	Ayr United
Airdrieonians	1 – 0	Clyde
Heart of Midlothian	3 – 0	East Fife
Rangers	3 – 1	Dundee

== Semi-finals ==
Aberdeen	2 – 2	Airdrieonians	Ibrox Park, Glasgow
Rangers	2 – 1	Heart of Midlothian	Hampden Park, Glasgow

=== Replay ===
Aberdeen	5 – 3	Airdrieonians	Ibrox Park, Glasgow

== Final ==
11 May 1946

Aberdeen	3–2	Rangers
Baird 1'; Williams 19'; Taylor 90'		Duncanson 49'; Thornton 70'

Hampden Park, Glasgow
Attendance: 135,000
Referee: W. Webb

=== Teams ===
Aberdeen:
GK	George Johnstone
RB	Willie Cooper
LB	Pat McKenna
RH	Andy Cowie
CH	Frank Dunlop
LH	George Taylor
OR	Alex Kiddie
IR	George Hamilton
CF	Stan Williams
IL	Archie Baird
OL	Willie McCall

Rangers:
GK	John Shaw
RB	Dougie Gray
LB	Jock Shaw
RH	Charlie Watkins
CH	George Young
LH	Scot Symon
OR	Willie Waddell
IR	Willie Thornton
CF	Billy Arnison
IL	Jimmy Duncanson
OL	Jimmy Caskie
