= 1939–40 Aberdeen F.C. season =

Aberdeen F.C.
1939–40 season
- Manager: Dave Halliday
- Scottish League Division One: suspended due to 2nd world war
- Scottish Emergency League Eastern Division: 4th
- Scottish War Emergency Cup: 1st Round
- Top goalscorer: League: All: Stan Williams (26)
- Highest home attendance: 35,000 vs. Celtic, 12 August
- Lowest home attendance: 3,000 vs. Hibernian, 4 November
Home colours

== Results ==
=== Division One ===
Match Day	Date	Opponent	H/A	Score	Aberdeen Scorer(s)	Attendance
1	12 August	Celtic	H	3–1	Christie, Hamilton (penalty), Strauss	35,000
2	19 August	Motherwell	A	0–3	Williams (2), Bremner, Millar	8,000
3	23 August	Celtic	A	3–1	Biggs, Christie, Strauss	30,000
4	26 August	Hibernian	H	3–1	Strauss (2), Hamilton	16,000
5	2 September	St Johnstone	A	0–3		6,000

=== Eastern Division ===
Match Day	Date	Opponent	H/A	Score	Aberdeen Scorer(s)	Attendance
1	21 October	Raith Rovers	A	5–1	Williams (2), Smith, Pattillo, Taylor (penalty)	5,000
2	28 October	Alloa Athletic	A	3–0	Taylor, Williams	3,500
3	4 November	Hibernian	H	3–3	Bain (2), Williams	3,000
4	11 November	Dunfermline Athletic	A	3–4	Williams, Smith, Beattie	3,000
5	18 November	St Bernard's	H	3–3	Beattie (2 including 1 penalty), Taylor	4,000
6	25 November	Dundee United	A	5–3	Smith, Williams, Cooper	3,000
7	2 December	Stenhousemuir	H	6–1	Ferguson (3), Williams, Bain, Beattie	4,000
8	9 December	King's Park	A	1–2	Williams	2,000
9	16 December	Heart of Midlothian	A	2–3	Williams (2)	7,000
10	23 December	St Johnstone	H	5–1	Williams (2), Ferguson, Bain, Smith	0
11	30 December	Dundee	A	1–3	Ferguson	0
12	1 January	Arbroath	A	1–2	Williams	1,000
13	2 January	Falkirk	H	6–2	Williams (3), Ferguson, Armstrong, Strauss	5,000
14	6 January	East Fife	A	4–1	Strauss (3), Williams	0
15	13 January	Cowdenbeath	H	8–1	Williams (2), Ferguson (2), Bain (2), Pattillo, Smith	0
16	27 January	Alloa Athletic	H	3–1	Thomson (penalty), Pattillo, Hamilton	0
17	10 February	Dunfermline Athletic	H	3–0	Pattillo (3)	0
18	17 February	St Bernard's	A	1–3	Ferguson	1,000
19	9 March	King's Park	H	5–2	Pattillo (2), Taylor (2), Ferguson	0
20	16 March	Heart of Midlothian	H	3–0	Taylor, Williams, Thomson	0
21	23 March	St Johnstone	A	0–3		2,000
22	30 March	Dundee	H	3–0	Thomson (penalty), Pattillo, Ferguson	0
23	1 April	Partcik Thistle	A	1–4	Pattillo	0
24	6 April	Arbroath	H	5–2	Williams (3), Bain, Pattillo,	19,000
25	13 April	Falkirk	A	1–0	McPherson	6,000
26	20 April	East Fife	H	2–2	Pattillo, Taylor	14,000
27	24 April	Dundee United	H	3–1	Williams, Ferguson, Pattillo	0
28	4 May	Stenhousemuir	A	0–0		0
29	18 May	Hibernian	A	0–2		6,000

==== Final league table ====
Eastern division
Pos	Team	Pld	W	D	L	GF	GA	GD	Pts
2	Dunfermline Athletic	29	19	2	8	80	55	+25	40
3	Heart of Midlothian	29	18	4	7	104	66	+38	40
4	Aberdeen	29	16	4	9	86	50	+36	36
5	St Johnstone	29	13	8	8	84	69	+15	34
6	Alloa Athletic	29	13	4	12	56	60	−4	30

=== Scottish War Emergency Cup ===
Round	Date	Opponent	H/A	Score	Aberdeen Scorer(s)	Attendance
R1 L1	24 February	Albion Rovers	A	3–3	Pattillo (2), Ferguson	4,000
R1 L2	2 March	Albion Rovers	H	0–1		8,841

== Squad ==
=== Appearances & Goals ===
No.	Pos	Nat	Player	Total		Division One		Scottish Cup	
No.	Pos	Nat	Player	Apps	Goals	Apps	Goals	Apps	Goals
	GK	(Scotland) SCO	George Johnstone	5	0	5	0	0	0
	DF	(Scotland) SCO	Frank Dunlop	5	0	5	0	0	0
	DF	(Scotland) SCO	Andy Cowie	5	0	5	0	0	0
	DF	(England) ENG	Sid Nicholson	5	0	5	0	0	0
	DF	(Scotland) SCO	Willie Cooper (c)	3	0	3	0	0	0
	DF	(England) ENG	Wilfred Adey	2	0	2	0	0	0
	MF	(South Africa) SOU	Bill Strauss	5	4	5	4	0	0
	MF	(Scotland) SCO	Dave Christie	5	2	5	2	0	0
	MF	(Scotland) SCO	Arthur Biggs	5	1	5	1	0	0
	MF	??	George Thomson	5	0	5	0	0	0
	MF	(Wales) WAL	Charlie Smith	1	0	1	0	0	0
	FW	(Scotland) SCO	George Hamilton	4	2	4	2	0	0
	FW	(Scotland) SCO	Matt Armstrong	4	0	4	0	0	0
	FW	(Scotland) SCO	Jock Pattillo	1	0	1	0	0	0

*Games played before league season was suspended

=== Unofficial Appearances & Goals ===
No.	Pos	Nat	Player	Total		Eastern Division		Scottish War Emergency Cup	
No.	Pos	Nat	Player	Apps	Goals	Apps	Goals	Apps	Goals
	GK	(Scotland) SCO	George Johnstone	21	0	21	0	0	0
	GK	??	Gordon Rennie	6	0	6	0	0	0
	GK	(South Africa) SOU	Pat Kelly	2	0	0	0	2	0
	GK	??	Alex Duguid	1	0	1	0	0	0
	GK	??	Unknown Trialist	1	0	1	0	0	0
	GK	(Scotland) SCO	Steve Smith	0	0	0	0	0	0
	GK	??	?? Cumming	0	0	0	0	0	0
	DF	??	Robert Graham	30	0	29	0	1	0
	DF	(Scotland) SCO	Willie Waddell	22	0	20	0	2	0
	DF	(Scotland) SCO	Willie Cooper (c)	10	0	10	0	0	0
	DF	(Scotland) SCO	Douglas Anderson	10	0	8	0	2	0
	DF	(Scotland) SCO	Frank Dunlop	8	0	8	0	0	0
	DF	(Scotland) SCO	Andy Cowie	2	0	1	0	1	0
	DF	(England) ENG	Wilfred Adey	0	0	0	0	0	0
	DF	(England) ENG	Sid Nicholson	0	0	0	0	0	0
	DF	??	Willie Laing	0	0	0	0	0	0
	MF	??	George Thomson	28	3	26	3	2	0
	MF	(Wales) WAL	Charlie Smith	18	6	16	6	2	0
	MF	??	Jock Thomson	16	0	14	0	2	0
	MF	(Scotland) SCO	George Taylor	15	8	15	8	0	0
	MF	(Scotland) SCO	Dave Christie	6	0	6	0	0	0
	MF	(South Africa) SOU	Bill Strauss	3	4	2	4	1	0
	MF	(Scotland) SCO	Ritchie Smith	2	0	2	0	0	0
	MF	(Scotland) SCO	Dick Donald	1	0	1	0	0	0
	MF	(Scotland) SCO	Sammy Ross	1	0	1	0	0	0
	MF	(Scotland) SCO	Frank Wilson	1	0	1	0	0	0
	MF	(Scotland) SCO	Archie Baird	0	0	0	0	0	0
	MF	(Scotland) SCO	Arthur Biggs	0	0	0	0	0	0
	FW	(South Africa) SOU	Stan Williams	27	25	26	25	1	0
	FW	(Scotland) SCO	Charlie Ferguson	27	13	25	12	2	1
	FW	(Scotland) SCO	Billy Bain	24	8	24	8	0	0
	FW	(Scotland) SCO	Jock Pattillo	20	15	19	13	1	2
	FW	(Scotland) SCO	George Scott	17	0	17	0	0	0
	FW	??	James Beattie	10	4	10	4	0	0
	FW	(Scotland) SCO	Willie Mills	6	0	4	0	2	0
	FW	(Scotland) SCO	Matt Armstrong	4	1	3	1	1	0
	FW	(Scotland) SCO	Ian McPherson	1	1	1	1	0	0
	FW	(Scotland) SCO	George Hamilton	0	0	0	0	0	0
	??	??	?? Junior	1	0	1	0	0	0
