= 1944–45 Aberdeen F.C. season =

Aberdeen F.C.
1944–45 season
- Manager: Dave Halliday
- North Eastern League: 2nd (Series 1), 1st (Series 2)
- North Eastern Football League Cup 1: Winners
- Mitchell Cup: Winners
- Top goalscorer: League: Ernie Waldron (28); All: Jock Patillo, Ernie Waldron (32)
- Highest home attendance: 16,000 vs. Dundee, 1 January
- Lowest home attendance: 3,700 vs. Arbroath, 25 November

== Results ==
=== North Eastern League Series 1 ===
Match Day	Date	Opponent	H/A	Score	Aberdeen Scorer(s)	Attendance
1	12 August	Arbroath	H	2–0	Green, Pattillo	10,000
2	19 August	Dundee	A	1–2	Green	13,000
3	26 August	Dunfermline Athletic	H	3–2	Waldron (2), Bremner	6,000
4	2 September	Falkirk "A"	A	5–0	Bremner (2), Munro (2), Pattillo	4,000
5	9 September	East Fife	H	7–1	Waldron (4), Bremner (2), Buchan	8,000
6	16 September	East Fife	A	4–5	Waldron (2), Buchan, Munro	3,000
7	23 September	Rangers "A"	A	2–1	Waldron (2)	5,000
8	30 September	Dundee United	H	5–1	Green (3), Waldron, Buchan	7,000
9	7 October	Heart of Midlothian "A"	H	2–0	Waldron, Pattillo	5,000
10	14 October	Raith Rovers	A	1–2	Buchan	3,000
11	21 October	Dunfermline Athletic	A	3–3	Pattillo (2), Waldron	4,500
12	28 October	Dundee	H	2–3	Pattillo (2)	15,000
13	4 November	Rangers "A"	H	4–1	Pattillo (2), Green (2)	5,000
14	11 November	Dundee United	A	5–0	Waldron (3), Green, Miller	12,000
15	18 November	Heart of Midlothian	A	7–0	Waldron (4), Green (2), Munro	4,000
16	25 November	Arbroath	H	2–0	Green (2), Pattillo	3,700
17	2 December	Falkirk "A"	H	7–0	Waldron (3), Pattillo, Bremner, Munro, Russell	5,000
18	9 December	Raith Rovers	H	2–0	Dunlop, Pattillo	5,000

==== Final League table ====
Pos	Team	Pld	W	D	L	GF	GA	GD	Pts
1	Dundee	18	13	2	3	56	30	+26	28
2	Aberdeen	18	13	1	4	65	21	+44	27
3	Raith Rovers	18	10	2	6	42	32	+10	22

=== North Eastern League Series 2 ===
Match Day	Date	Opponent	H/A	Score	Aberdeen Scorer(s)	Attendance
1	1 January	Dundee	H	5–0	Pattillo (2), Armstrong (2), Williams	16,000
2	2 January	Arbroath	A	2–2	Waldron, Armstrong	0
3	27 January	Rangers "A"	A	2–1	Russell, Armstrong	4,000
4	10 February	Dundee United	A	9–1	Green (4), Waldron (2), Pattillo (2), Miller	6,000
5	17 February	Raith Rovers	H	8–0	Green (4), Waldron (2), Pattillo (2)	5,000
6	24 February	Dunfermline Athletic	A	4–1	Bremner (2), Dyer, Pattillo	2,000
7	3 March	Arbroath	H	2–2	Bremner, Dyer	5,000
8	10 March	Falkirk "A"	A	1–2	Hood	0
9	17 March	Raith Rovers	A	4–1	Pattillo (2), Bremner, Miller	3,500
10	24 March	Heart of Midlothian "A"	H	3–1	Baird, Armstrong, Lloyd	10,000
11	31 March	East Fife	H	2–2	Lloyd, Pattillo	4,500
12	7 April	Dundee	A	4–1	Armstrong (4)	13,200
13	14 April	Rangers "A"	H	1–0	Pattillo (2), Green (2)	6,000
14	21 April	Dunfermline Athletic	H	0–1		6,000
15	28 April	East Fife	A	0–1		4,000
16	5 May	Dundee United	H	6–0	Williams (2), Bremner (2), Miller, Taylor	5,000
17	7 May	Falkirk "A"	H	7–0	Pattillo (3), McCall, Miller, Cox	10,000
18	7 July	Heart of Midlothian "A"	H	1–3	Armstrong	5,000

==== Final League table ====
Pos	Team	Pld	W	D	L	GF	GA	GD	BP	Pts
1	Aberdeen	18	11	3	4	63	19	+44	6	31
2	East Fife	18	10	3	5	39	29	+10	5	28
3	Rangers "A"	18	10	3	5	41	25	+16	4	27

Rules for classification: Bonus points: 3 points were awarded for an away win, 2 points for an away draw

=== North Eastern Cup 1 ===
Round	Date	Opponent	H/A	Score	Aberdeen Scorer(s)	Attendance
SF L1	16 December	Dunfermline Athletic	A	1–2	Pattillo	0
SF L2	23 December	Dunfermline Athletic	H	2–0	Pattillo, Williams	0
F	1 January	Dundee	H	5–0	Pattillo (2), Armstrong (2), Williams	16,000

=== Mitchell Cup ===
Round	Date	Opponent	H/A	Score	Aberdeen Scorer(s)	Attendance
R1 L1	19 May	East Fife	A	1–2	Williams	6,000
R1 L2	26 May	East Fife	H	2–1 (Aberdeen win by a corner kick in extra time)	Armstrong, Baird, Williams	12,000
QF	2 June	Raith Rovers	H	3–1	Pattillo (2), Cocker	8,000
SF L1	9 June	Falkirk "A"	A	1–2	Williams	4,000
SF L2	16 June	Falkirk "A"	H	7–0	Munro (2), Pattillo, Miller, Williams, Dyer	10,000
F L1	23 June	Heart of Midlothian "A"	H	3–3	Pattillo (2), McMahon	8,000
F L2	30 June	Heart of Midlothian "A"	H	1–0	Baird	12,000

== Squad ==
=== Unofficial Appearances & Goals ===
No.	Pos	Nat	Player	Total		North Eastern League Series 1 & 2		North Eastern Cup		Mitchell Cup	
No.	Pos	Nat	Player	Apps	Goals	Apps	Goals	Apps	Goals	Apps	Goals
	GK	(Scotland) SCO	George Johnstone	44	0	34	0	3	0	7	0
	GK	(South Africa) SOU	Pat Kelly	1	0	1	0	0	0	0	0
	GK	(Scotland) SCO	Ian Black	1	0	1	0	0	0	0	0
	DF	(Scotland) SCO	Frank Dunlop	40	1	33	1	3	0	4	0
	DF	(Scotland) SCO	Willie Cooper (c)	33	0	30	0	3	0	0	0
	DF	(Scotland) SCO	Pat McKenna	29	0	20	0	3	0	6	0
	DF	(England) ENG	Alex Dyer	23	3	18	2	0	0	5	1
	DF	??	David Johnstone	6	0	1	0	0	0	5	0
	DF	(England) ENG	Sid Nicholson	4	0	4	0	0	0	0	0
	DF	??	Charlie Higgins	4	0	4	0	0	0	0	0
	DF	??	John Lowe	2	0	2	0	0	0	0	0
	DF	(Scotland) SCO	Freddie Cox	1	1	1	1	0	0	0	0
	DF	(Scotland) SCO	Ralph McKenzie	1	0	1	0	0	0	0	0
	MF	(Scotland) SCO	George Taylor	29	2	20	2	3	0	6	0
	MF	??	John Miller	26	8	20	5	2	0	4	1
	MF	(Scotland) SCO	Jimmy Munro	26	7	19	5	2	0	5	2
	MF	(Scotland) SCO	David Russell	25	2	22	2	3	0	0	0
	MF	??	John Cruickshank	23	0	17	0	0	0	6	0
	MF	(England) ENG	George Green	16	20	15	20	1	0	0	0
	MF	(England) ENG	Stan Lloyd	8	2	7	2	1	0	0	0
	MF	??	William Cocker	6	0	4	0	1	0	1	0
	MF	(Scotland) SCO	Chris Anderson	5	0	5	0	0	0	0	0
	MF	(Scotland) SCO	Willie McCall	2	1	2	1	0	0	0	0
	MF	??	J. Taylor	2	0	1	0	0	0	1	0
	MF	(South Africa) SOU	Bill Strauss	1	0	1	0	0	0	0	0
	MF	(Scotland) SCO	Doug Smith	1	0	1	0	0	0	0	0
	MF	??	George Thomson	1	0	1	0	0	0	0	0
	MF	??	Tom Gallacher	1	0	1	0	0	0	0	0
	MF	??	John Girdwood	1	0	0	0	0	0	1	0
	FW	(Scotland) SCO	Jock Pattillo	45	32	35	25	3	2	7	5
	FW	(Scotland) SCO	Hutton Bremner	21	13	16	13	2	0	3	0
	FW	(England) ENG	Ernie Waldron	20	32	19	28	1	4	0	0
	FW	(South Africa) SOU	Stan Williams	13	9	4	3	2	2	7	4
	FW	(Scotland) SCO	Martin Buchan	13	4	12	4	0	0	1	0
	FW	(Scotland) SCO	Archie Baird	12	3	8	1	0	0	4	2
	FW	(Scotland) SCO	Matt Armstrong	9	11	7	10	0	0	2	1
	FW	??	?? Junior	4	0	4	0	0	0	0	0
	FW	??	?? Newman	3	0	3	0	0	0	0	0
	FW	(England) ENG	James Richardson	1	0	1	0	0	0	0	0
	??	??	Robert McMahon	2	2	0	0	0	0	2	2
	??	??	?? Hood	1	1	1	1	0	0	0	0
