= 1946 Victory Cup =

One-off Scottish football competition

The Victory Cup was a one-off Scottish football competition held in 1946 to celebrate the end of World War II. It is an unofficial competition in statistical terms, taking place at the end of the 1945–46 season just before official competitions such as the Scottish Football League and the Scottish Cup resumed.

The winners of the Victory Cup were Rangers who defeated Hibernian 3–1 in the final at Hampden Park in Glasgow.

== Summary ==
The format was a straight knockout tournament open to clubs from across Scotland, with the first round being played over two legs, subsequent rounds in a single match with replays as necessary and the semi-finals and final at neutral venues. A preliminary tournament took place between September 1945 and January 1946, with Clachnacuddin and East Stirlingshire (who won the final held between them in a second replay) qualifying to make up 32 participants for the final tournament which was held between April and June 1946.

The trophy itself had been used throughout the war for the Southern League Cup which was contested five times on a regional basis, four of these being won by Rangers. Its last edition was played on a nationwide basis (acting as a forerunner to the Scottish League Cup) and was won by Aberdeen. However, the Scottish Football Association asked for the trophy to be returned for use in the Victory Cup, and Rangers' win meant it stayed in their possession permanently.

A similar wartime competition was held at the end of World War I, won by St Mirren.

A separate Victory In Europe Cup had been held in May 1945, in the form of a single match at Hampden between Celtic and Queen's Park arranged by the organisers of the Glasgow Merchants Charity Cup; Celtic won that trophy by having won one more corner kick, following a 1–1 result.

== Results ==
=== First round ===
Leg 1	Team 1	Aggregate	Team 2	Leg 2
2–0	Aberdeen	4–0	Hamilton Academical	2–0
4–0	Airdrieonians	5–1	Dumbarton	1–1
3–1	Alloa Athletic	3–6	Heart of Midlothian	0–5
3–4	Arbroath	4–7	Raith Rovers	1–3
1–3	Ayr United	3–7	Morton	2–4
2–2	Clachnacuddin	3–9	Partick Thistle	1–7
4–2	Clyde	6–3	Albion Rovers	2–1
0–0	Cowdenbeath	5–3	Queen's Park	5–3
2–1	Dundee United	3–4	Queen of the South	1–3
2–0	East Fife	2–3	Kilmarnock	0–3
2–1	Falkirk	6–3	Motherwell	4–2
3–0	Hibernian	3–2	Dundee	0–2
2–8	St Johnstone	2–13	Celtic	0–5
3–1	St Mirren	5–3	East Stirlingshire	2–2
1–4	Stenhousemuir	2–8	Rangers	1–4
1–2	Third Lanark	3–2	Dunfermline Athletic	2–0

=== Second round ===
Team 1	Aggregate	Team 2
Aberdeen	1–1	Kilmarnock
Airdrieonians	0–4	Rangers
Celtic	3–0	Queen of the South
Clyde	0–0	Morton
Cowdenbeath	1–1	Partick Thistle
Falkirk	3–2	Third Lanark
Hibernian	3–1	Heart of Midlothian
Raith Rovers	2–1	St Mirren

==== Replays ====
Team 1	Aggregate	Team 2
Kilmarnock	0–3	Aberdeen
Morton	0–2	Clyde
Partick Thistle	2–1	Cowdenbeath

=== Quarter-finals ===
Team 1	Aggregate	Team 2
Clyde	4–2	Aberdeen
Falkirk	1–1	Rangers
Partick Thistle	1–1	Hibernian
Raith Rovers	0–2	Celtic

==== Replays ====
Team 1	Aggregate	Team 2
Rangers	2–0	Falkirk
Hibernian	2–0	Partick Thistle

=== Semi-finals ===
Team 1	Aggregate	Team 2	Venue
Hibernian	2–1	Clyde	Tynecastle Park
Rangers	0–0	Celtic	Hampden Park

==== Replay ====
Team 1	Aggregate	Team 2	Venue
Celtic	0–2	Rangers	Hampden Park

== Final ==
15 June 1946

Rangers	3–1	Hibernian
Gillick; Duncanson		Aitkenhead

Hampden Park, Glasgow
Attendance: 100,000
Referee: J. M. Martin

Rangers:
GK	Bobby Brown
FB	Sammy Cox
FB	Jock Shaw
RH	Charlie Watkins
CH	George Young
LH	Scot Symon
RW	Willie Waddell
IF	Torrance Gillick
CF	Willie Thornton
IF	Jimmy Duncanson
LW	Jimmy Caskie
Manager:
Bill Struth

Hibernian:
GK	1	Jimmy Kerr
DF	2	Jock Govan
DF	3	Davie Shaw
MF	4	Hugh Howie
MF	5	Peter Aird
MF	6	Willie Finnigan
FW	7	Gordon Smith
FW	8	Willie Peat
FW	9	Arthur Milne
FW	10	Johnny Aitkenhead
FW	11	Bobby Nutley
Manager:
Willie McCartney
