= 1943–44 Aberdeen F.C. season =

Aberdeen F.C.
1943–44 season
- Manager: Dave Halliday
- North Eastern League: 3rd (Series 1), 1st (Series 2)
- North Eastern Football League Cup 1: Semi-finalists
- Mitchell Cup: Semi-finalists
- Top goalscorer: League: Jock Pattillo (22); All: Jock Pattillo (29)
- Highest home attendance: 12,000 vs. Rangers "A", 28 August
- Lowest home attendance: 2,000 vs. East Fife, 3 January

== Results ==
=== North Eastern League Series 1 ===
| Match Day | Date | Opponent | H/A | Score | Aberdeen Scorer(s) | Attendance |
|---|---|---|---|---|---|---|
| 1 | 14 August | Dunfermline Athletic | H | 7–2 | Ferguson (4), Pattillo (3) | 10,000 |
| 2 | 21 August | Raith Rovers | A | 2–3 | Ancell, Ferguson | 3,000 |
| 3 | 28 August | Rangers "A" | H | 4–1 | Pattillo (2), Mortensen, Ancell | 12,000 |
| 4 | 4 September | Heart of Midlothian | A | 2–2 | Mortensen (2) | 5,000 |
| 5 | 11 September | Dundee United | A | 0–2 | | 3,500 |
| 6 | 18 September | Falkirk "A" | H | 3–0 | Ancell (2), Dyer (penalty) | 7,000 |
| 7 | 25 September | East Fife | H | 2–0 | Armstrong, Gourlay | 5,000 |
| 8 | 2 October | Dunfermline Athletic | A | 1–3 | Collier | 3,000 |
| 9 | 9 October | Heart of Midlothian "A" | H | 3–0 | Pattillo (2), Ancell | 5,000 |
| 10 | 16 October | Raith Rovers | H | 4–1 | Green (2 including 1 penalty), Taylor (2 penalties) | 5,000 |
| 11 | 23 October | Rangers "A" | A | 0–4 | | 0 |
| 12 | 30 October | East Fife | A | 1–1 | Moir | 2,500 |
| 13 | 6 November | Dundee United | H | 5–1 | Pattillo (4), Dryden | 0 |
| 14 | 20 November | Falkirk "A" | A | 2–2 | Pattillo, Dryden | 0 |

==== Final League table ====
| Pos | Team | Pld | W | D | L | GF | GA | GD | Pts |
|---|---|---|---|---|---|---|---|---|---|
| 2 | Heart of Midlothian "A" | 14 | 9 | 1 | 4 | 35 | 27 | +8 | 19 |
| 3 | Aberdeen | 14 | 7 | 3 | 4 | 36 | 22 | +14 | 17 |
| 4 | Dunfermline Athletic | 14 | 8 | 1 | 5 | 35 | 22 | +13 | 17 |

=== North Eastern League Series 2 ===
| Match Day | Date | Opponent | H/A | Score | Aberdeen Scorer(s) | Attendance |
|---|---|---|---|---|---|---|
| 1 | 1 January | Dundee United | H | 1–1 | Thomson | 8,000 |
| 2 | 3 January | East Fife | H | 0–0 | | 2,000 |
| 3 | 8 January | Dunfermline Athletic | A | 2–1 | Dryden (2) | 1,500 |
| 4 | 15 January | Heart of Midlothian "A" | H | 5–2 | Williams (2), Armstrong, Taylor, Buchan | 0 |
| 5 | 22 January | East Fife | A | 1–2 | Armstrong | 0 |
| 6 | 29 January | Dundee United | A | 7–1 | Pattillo (2), Buchan (2), Green, Taylor, Temple | 3,000 |
| 7 | 5 February | Falkirk "A" | H | 3–1 | Moir, Pattillo, Taylor | 5,000 |
| 8 | 12 February | Rangers "A" | A | 2–3 | Green, Pattillo | 0 |
| 9 | 19 February | Heart of Midlothian "A" | A | 2–1 | Buchan, Pattillo | 3,000 |
| 10 | 4 March | Falkirk "A" | A | 10–2 | Dryden (4), Pattillo (3), Buchan (2), Brown | 2,500 |
| 11 | 11 March | Raith Rovers | H | 1–0 | Bremner | 5,000 |
| 12 | 18 March | Raith Rovers | A | 0–2 | | 2,000 |
| 13 | 25 March | Dunfermline Athletic | H | 3–2 | Ancell, Dryden, Thomson (penalty) | 4,000 |
| 14 | 22 April | Rangers "A" | H | 3–0 | Pattillo (2) | 0 |

==== Final League table ====
| Pos | Team | Pld | W | D | L | GF | GA | GD | BP | Pts |
|---|---|---|---|---|---|---|---|---|---|---|
| 1 | Aberdeen | 14 | 9 | 2 | 3 | 40 | 18 | +22 | 4 | 24 |
| 2 | Rangers "A" | 14 | 9 | 2 | 3 | 42 | 25 | +17 | 4 | 24 |
| 3 | East Fife | 14 | 6 | 3 | 5 | 26 | 14 | +12 | 3 | 18 |

Rules for classification: Bonus points: 3 points were awarded for an away win, 2 points for an away draw<

=== North Eastern Cup ===
| Round | Date | Opponent | H/A | Score | Aberdeen Scorer(s) | Attendance |
|---|---|---|---|---|---|---|
| QF L1 | 27 November | Raith Rovers | H | 6–1 | Ancell (2), Dyer, Dunlop, Green, Pattillo | 5,000 |
| QF L2 | 4 December | Raith Rovers | A | 1–2 | Pattillo | 3,000 |
| SF | 18 December | Rangers "A" | H | 0–2 | | 10,000 |

=== Mitchell Cup ===
| Round | Date | Opponent | H/A | Score | Aberdeen Scorer(s) | Attendance |
|---|---|---|---|---|---|---|
| R1 L1 | 1 April | Dunfermline Athletic | H | 3–2 | Pattillo, Thomson, Taylor | 6,000 |
| R1 L2 | 8 April | Dunfermline Athletic | A | 2–1 | Pattillo, Wallbanks | 4,000 |
| SF L1 | 15 April | Raith Rovers | H | 2–2 | Pattillo (2) | 8,000 |
| SF L2 | 29 April | Raith Rovers | A | 1–2 | Pattillo | 5,740 |

== Squad ==
=== Unofficial Appearances & Goals ===
| No. | Pos | Nat | Player | Total | | North Eastern League Series 1 & 2 | | North Eastern Cup | | Mitchell Cup | |
| No. | Pos | Nat | Player | Apps | Goals | Apps | Goals | Apps | Goals | Apps | Goals |
|---|---|---|---|---|---|---|---|---|---|---|---|
| | GK | (Scotland) SCO | George Johnstone | 34 | 0 | 27 | 0 | 3 | 0 | 4 | 0 |
| | GK | (South Africa) SOU | Pat Kelly | 1 | 0 | 1 | 0 | 0 | 0 | 0 | 0 |
| | DF | (Scotland) SCO | Frank Dunlop | 34 | 1 | 27 | 0 | 3 | 1 | 4 | 0 |
| | DF | (Scotland) SCO | Willie Cooper (c) | 33 | 0 | 27 | 0 | 3 | 0 | 3 | 0 |
| | DF | (Scotland) SCO | Bobby Ancell | 24 | 8 | 19 | 6 | 3 | 2 | 2 | 0 |
| | DF | (England) ENG | Alex Dyer | 23 | 2 | 20 | 1 | 2 | 1 | 1 | 0 |
| | DF | ?? | Ernie Hiles | 5 | 0 | 5 | 0 | 0 | 0 | 0 | 0 |
| | DF | (Scotland) SCO | Charlie Gavin | 5 | 0 | 4 | 0 | 0 | 0 | 1 | 0 |
| | DF | (Scotland) SCO | Freddie Cox | 4 | 0 | 4 | 0 | 0 | 0 | 0 | 0 |
| | DF | ?? | Malcolm Sinclair | 3 | 0 | 1 | 0 | 0 | 0 | 2 | 0 |
| | MF | (Scotland) SCO | George Taylor | 27 | 6 | 24 | 5 | 1 | 0 | 2 | 1 |
| | MF | (England) ENG | George Green | 19 | 5 | 15 | 4 | 3 | 1 | 1 | 0 |
| | MF | ?? | George Thomson | 18 | 3 | 11 | 2 | 3 | 0 | 4 | 1 |
| | MF | (Scotland) SCO | Chris Anderson | 9 | 0 | 7 | 0 | 0 | 0 | 2 | 0 |
| | MF | ?? | William Cocker | 6 | 0 | 5 | 0 | 1 | 0 | 0 | 0 |
| | MF | ?? | John Cruickshank | 3 | 0 | 1 | 0 | 0 | 0 | 2 | 0 |
| | MF | (South Africa) SOU | Bill Strauss | 2 | 0 | 2 | 0 | 0 | 0 | 0 | 0 |
| | FW | (Scotland) SCO | Jock Pattillo | 34 | 29 | 27 | 22 | 3 | 2 | 4 | 5 |
| | FW | (Scotland) SCO | Martin Buchan | 13 | 6 | 9 | 6 | 0 | 0 | 4 | 0 |
| | FW | (England) ENG | Austin Collier | 12 | 1 | 9 | 1 | 3 | 0 | 0 | 0 |
| | FW | (Scotland) SCO | Matt Armstrong | 6 | 3 | 6 | 3 | 0 | 0 | 0 | 0 |
| | FW | (Scotland) SCO | Charlie Ferguson | 5 | 5 | 5 | 5 | 0 | 0 | 0 | 0 |
| | FW | (England) ENG | Horace Wallbanks | 5 | 1 | 1 | 0 | 0 | 0 | 4 | 1 |
| | FW | (Scotland) SCO | Alex McSpayden | 5 | 0 | 5 | 0 | 0 | 0 | 0 | 0 |
| | FW | ?? | ?? Newman | 5 | 0 | 5 | 0 | 0 | 0 | 0 | 0 |
| | FW | (England) ENG | Stan Mortensen | 3 | 3 | 3 | 3 | 0 | 0 | 0 | 0 |
| | FW | (South Africa) SOU | Stan Williams | 3 | 2 | 3 | 2 | 0 | 0 | 0 | 0 |
| | FW | (Scotland) SCO | Hutton Bremner | 3 | 1 | 3 | 1 | 0 | 0 | 0 | 0 |
| | FW | ?? | Alex Gourlay | 3 | 1 | 3 | 1 | 0 | 0 | 0 | 0 |
| | FW | ?? | Martin Borthwick | 2 | 0 | 2 | 0 | 0 | 0 | 0 | 0 |
| | FW | ?? | Walter Pirie | 1 | 0 | 1 | 0 | 0 | 0 | 0 | 0 |
| | FW | ?? | George Moses | 1 | 0 | 1 | 0 | 0 | 0 | 0 | 0 |
| | ?? | ?? | John Dryden | 26 | 9 | 19 | 9 | 3 | 0 | 4 | 0 |
| | ?? | ?? | Billy Moir | 8 | 2 | 6 | 2 | 2 | 0 | 0 | 0 |
