= Stan Lloyd =

Stan Lloyd may refer to:

- Stan Lloyd (Australian footballer) (1911–1987), Australian rules footballer
- Stan Lloyd (English footballer) (1924–2011), English football winger
- Stan Lloyd (politician) (1889–1967), Australian politician
