= Alex Dyer =

Alex or Alexander Dyer may refer to:

- Alex Dyer (footballer, born 1965), retired English footballer
- Alex Dyer (footballer, born 1990), active Swedish-born, Montserratian footballer
- Alexander Brydie Dyer (1815–1874), American Civil War soldier

== See also ==
- Joseph Alexander Dyer, Scottish footballer for Aberdeen F.C., Plymouth Argyle, and Huddersfield in the 1940s
