= Willie Waddell (footballer, born 1919) =

Scottish footballer

Personal information
- Full name: William Waddell
- Date of birth: 12 December 1919
- Place of birth: Renfrew, Scotland
- Date of death: 1979 (aged 59–60)
- Place of death: South Yorkshire, England
- Height: 5 ft 10 1/2 in (1.79 m)
- Positions: Centre half; left half

Senior career*
Years	Team	Apps	(Gls)
–	Strathclyde		
–	Renfrew		
1938–1950	Aberdeen	74	(0)
1950–1953	Kettering Town		
- * Club domestic league appearances and goals

William Waddell (12 December 1919 – 1979) was a Scottish professional footballer who played primarily as a centre half for Aberdeen and Kettering Town. Waddell played for Aberdeen in their 1947 Scottish Cup Final victory against Hibernian.

== Career statistics ==
Appearances and goals by club, season and competition
Club	Season	League			Scottish Cup		League Cup		Total	
Club	Season	Division	Apps	Goals	Apps	Goals	Apps	Goals	Apps	Goals
Aberdeen	1938-39	Scottish Division One	3	0	0	0	-	-	3	0
Aberdeen	1939-40	Scottish Division One	0	0	0	0	-	-	0	0
Aberdeen	1940-41	Competitive Football Cancelled Due to WW2								
Aberdeen	1941-42	Competitive Football Cancelled Due to WW2								
Aberdeen	1942-43	Competitive Football Cancelled Due to WW2								
Aberdeen	1943-44	Competitive Football Cancelled Due to WW2								
Aberdeen	1944-45	Competitive Football Cancelled Due to WW2								
Aberdeen	1945-46	Competitive Football Cancelled Due to WW2								
Aberdeen	1946-47	Scottish Division One	12	0	2	0	6	0	20	0
Aberdeen	1947-48	Scottish Division One	23	0	2	0	5	0	30	0
Aberdeen	1948-49	Scottish Division One	25	0	1	0	6	0	32	0
Aberdeen	1949-50	Scottish Division One	11	0	0	0	2	0	13	0
Aberdeen	Total		74	0	5	0	19	0	98	0
