= John Lang (footballer, born 1908) =

Scottish footballer

Personal information
- Full name: John Lang
- Date of birth: 9 June 1908
- Place of birth: Dumbarton, Scotland
- Height: 5 ft 9 in (1.75 m)
- Position: Outside left

Senior career*
Years	Team	Apps	(Gls)
- Maryhill
1931–1933	Dumbarton	57	(14)
1933–1935	King's Park	61	(22)
1935–1938	Aberdeen	47	(16)
1937–1940	Barnsley		
- * Club domestic league appearances and goals

John Lang (born 9 June 1908) was a Scottish footballer who played for Dumbarton, King's Park, Aberdeen and Barnsley, mostly as an outside left. He appeared in the 1937 Scottish Cup Final which Aberdeen lost 2–1 to Celtic.
