= Sammy Kean =

Scottish footballer and manager

Samuel Rae Kean (7 December 1917 – 17 April 2003) was a Scottish football player and manager

Kean was born in Dumbarton in 1917 to James Kean and Sarah Rae Kean. Hibernian signed Kean from Kirkintilloch Rob Roy as an outside left. Kean made his senior debut on 14 August 1937, in a Scottish League match against Queen's Park. Hibs manager Willie McCartney used Kean as left half and he formed a partnership with Matt Busby when Busby signed for Hibs in 1941 as a wartime guest player. Kean made one appearance for Scotland during the war. When competitive football resumed after the war, Kean was an important figure supporting the Famous Five forward line. Kean played in the 1947 Scottish Cup Final and won a league championship medal in 1948. Kean represented the Scottish League once, in April 1947.

Kean ceased his playing career after the 1948–49 season and then worked for Hibs as an assistant trainer. He moved to Dundee in the late 1950s, assisting Bob Shankly with their league championship winning team in 1962. Kean was credited with the signing of Gordon Smith, as the pair had a working relationship dating back to shifts in the Leith shipyards during the war. Kean also coached Falkirk and Partick Thistle.

Kean worked for the Gas Board for the rest of his working life. Besides football, he was also a keen golfer and lawn bowls player. His wife Mary died in 1993 and Kean suffered from Alzheimer's disease in his later years.
