= George Hamilton (footballer) =

Scottish footballer

Personal information
- Date of birth: 7 December 1917
- Place of birth: Irvine, Scotland
- Date of death: May 2001 (aged 83)
- Place of death: Aberdeen, Scotland
- Position: Inside forward

Senior career*
Years	Team	Apps	(Gls)
1934–1937	Irvine Meadow		
1937–1938	Queen of the South	31	(9)
1938–1947	Aberdeen	67	(36)
1947–1948	Heart of Midlothian	15	(13)
1948–1955	Aberdeen	137	(68)
1955	Hamilton Academical	11	(2)
Total		261	(128)

International career
1946–1954	Scotland	5	(4)
1947–1951	Scottish Football League XI	3	(2)
- * Club domestic league appearances and goals

George Hamilton (7 December 1917 – May 2001) was a Scottish international footballer, who spent most of his 21-year career with Aberdeen. He also played for Queen of the South, Heart of Midlothian and Hamilton Academical.

Starting his career at Irvine Meadow, Hamilton moved to Queen of the South, showcasing his ambidextrous skills and scoring nine goals in a single season, before joining Aberdeen in 1938. His playing career, disrupted by World War II, included time at Ayr United and Rangers, before returning to Aberdeen to achieve notable success including winning the Scottish Cup in 1947. Hamilton later played for Heart of Midlothian and returned to Aberdeen, contributing to their success until moving to Hamilton Academical, where he retired. Internationally, he represented Scotland, participating in the 1954 FIFA World Cup squad.

== Playing career ==
=== Queen of the South ===
Born in Irvine, Hamilton started out with local junior side Irvine Meadow before moving to Dumfries to join Queen of the South. Hamilton was comfortable with the ball on either foot and had an obvious love of playing the game. After a single season with Queens (scoring nine goals in 31 league games) Aberdeen managed by Dave Halliday (another ex-Queen of the South player) purchased him for £3000 in April 1938.

=== Aberdeen ===
Following the signing by Halliday, Hamilton's career was significantly disrupted by the Second World War and, when League football in Scotland went into abeyance in 1939, he returned to his native Ayrshire. Eventually, temporary Regional Leagues were established, and, due to war-time travel restrictions, players would guest for local sides. This resulted in Hamilton turning out for first Ayr United, then Rangers between 1940 and 1945.

Hamilton returned to Aberdeen at the end of global hostilities and enjoyed his most successful period, lifting the transitional 1945–46 League Cup then scoring the winner in the 1947 Scottish Cup Final against Hibernian. Despite this, when Heart of Midlothian offered £8000 plus the younger Archie Kelly for his services in December 1947, the Reds considered it good value for a 30-year-old, and accepted.

=== Heart of Midlothian ===
After only 17 appearances (scoring six goals in thirteen league games) for Hearts, an unsettled Hamilton returned to Aberdeen.

=== Return to Aberdeen ===
In March 1950 Hamilton played in a titanic Scottish Cup quarter final tussle against former club Queen of the South, eventually losing 4–3 after being three goals up.

Despite Aberdeen's erratic league results, Hamilton helped the side to two further (losing) Scottish Cup Final appearances, in 1953 and 1954.

Age eventually caught up with Hamilton and he was transferred to Hamilton Academical in 1955, having largely watched from the sidelines as a young Dons side won the 1954–55 League title with the long serving Halliday still at the helm.

=== Hamilton Academical ===
Hamilton retired a matter of months after joining Academicals, not long after his 38th birthday. In his eleven league appearances for the club he scored two goals.

== International career ==
Hamilton's consistent good form in 1945–46 earned him a Scotland national team debut against Northern Ireland.

Hamilton twice earned an international recall, initially in 1951, when he scored a hat-trick against Belgium, then remarkably in 1954 when aged 36. He played two games against Norway, scoring the only goal of the game played in Scotland. This latter return coincided with the 1954 FIFA World Cup and Hamilton was selected in the 22-man squad for Switzerland. Scotland decided to take only 13 players to the finals, and Hamilton was initially one of the players told to stay at home on reserve. Bobby Johnstone then withdrew through injury, and Hamilton was called in to replace him in the 13-man squad. Hamilton did not play in either of Scotland's two games at the tournament.

Hamilton was the first former Queen of the South player to travel to the World Cup Finals. Sam Malcolmson to Spain in 1982 and Bernie Slaven at Italia 90 are the others to have done so.

== Later years ==
After hanging up his boots, Hamilton joined the Aberdeen coaching team.

== Career statistics ==
=== Club ===
Appearances and goals by club, season and competition
Club	Season	League			Scottish Cup		League Cup		Total	
Club	Season	Division	Apps	Goals	Apps	Goals	Apps	Goals	Apps	Goals
Irvine Meadow	1934–35	-	-	-	-	-	-	-	-	-
Irvine Meadow	1935–36	-	-	-	-	-	-	-	-	-
Irvine Meadow	1936–37	-	-	-	-	-	-	-	-	-
Irvine Meadow	Total		-	-	-	-	-	-	-	-
Queen of the South	1937–38	Scottish Division One	31	9	-	-	-	-	31+	9+
Aberdeen	1938–39	Scottish Division One	37	17	5	1	-	-	42	18
Aberdeen	1939–40	Scottish Division One	4*	2	0	0	-	-	4*	2
Aberdeen	1940–41	League football cancelled due to the Second World War								
Aberdeen	1941–42	League football cancelled due to the Second World War								
Aberdeen	1942–43	League football cancelled due to the Second World War								
Aberdeen	1943–44	League football cancelled due to the Second World War								
Aberdeen	1944–45	League football cancelled due to the Second World War								
Aberdeen	1945–46	League football cancelled due to the Second World War								
Aberdeen	1946–47	Scottish Division One	26	17	7	5	9	11	42	33
Aberdeen	Total		67	36	12	6	9	11	88	53
Heart of Midlothian	1947–48	Scottish Division One	15	13	2	0	0	0	17	15
Aberdeen	1947–48	Scottish Division One	8	2	0	0	6	7	14	9
Aberdeen	1948–49	Scottish Division One	19	10	1	1	6	4	26	15
Aberdeen	1949–50	Scottish Division One	26	9	5	2	1	0	32	11
Aberdeen	1950–51	Scottish Division One	28	17	2	4	10	8	40	29
Aberdeen	1951–52	Scottish Division One	19	13	0	0	4	1	23	14
Aberdeen	1952–53	Scottish Division One	18	15	6	2	0	0	24	17
Aberdeen	1953–54	Scottish Division One	15	0	5	3	6	1	26	4
Aberdeen	1954–55	Scottish Division One	4	2	1	0	6	1	11	3
Aberdeen	Total		137	68	20	12	33	22	196	102
Hamilton Academical	1954–55	Scottish Division Two	11	2	-	-	-	-	11+	2+
Career total			261	128	34+	18+	42+	33+	343+	181+

=== International ===
#	Date	Opponent	Result	Hamilton goals	Competition
1	27 November 1946	Northern Ireland	Scotland 0–0 Northern Ireland	0	1947 British Home Championship
2	20 May 1951	Belgium	Belgium 0–5 Scotland	3	Friendly match
3	27 May 1951	Austria	Austria 4–0 Scotland	0	Friendly match
4	5 May 1954	Norway	Scotland 1–0 Norway	1	Friendly match
5	19 May 1954	Norway	Norway 1–1 Scotland	0	Friendly match

== Honours ==
Aberdeen

- Scottish Cup: 1947
- Southern League Cup (Scotland): 1946

== See also ==
- List of Scotland national football team hat-tricks
