= Billy Halliday =

Scottish footballer

Personal information
- Full name: William Halliday
- Date of birth: 14 November 1906
- Place of birth: Dumfries, Scotland
- Date of death: 4 th January 1989 1989 (aged 82–83)
- Place of death: Dumfries, Scotland
- Position: Inside forward

Senior career*
Years	Team	Apps	(Gls)
1923–1927	Queen of the South	61	(21)
1927–1928	Newcastle United	1	(0)
1928–1930	Third Lanark	29	(9)
1929–1930	→ Connah's Quay & Shotton (loan)		
1930–1932	Exeter City	11	(1)
1934–1935	St Cuthbert Wanderers		
- * Club domestic league appearances and goals

William Halliday (14 November 1906 – 1989) was a Scottish professional association football inside left who played for Queen of the South, Newcastle United, Third Lanark, Exeter City and St Cuthbert Wanderers.

== Career ==
Born in Dumfries, Halliday was an inside left and signed for hometown club Queen of the South in 1923. His brother Dave Halliday had played for Queen's before him in 1920, alongside Ian Dickson. Billy Halliday was a strong and fearless type of player who always gave his all. His first game was a friendly match versus Manchester University at Palmerston Park that Queen's won 4–1, with Halliday scoring on his debut.

The 1926–27 season saw Queen's drawn for the first time in a cup competition against Old Firm opposition. They took eventual winners Celtic to a replay before being eliminated from the Scottish Cup. Amongst those playing for Queen's was inside left forward Halliday.

Halliday was considered by many as the best inside forward in the division. His nine goals in 15 games in his last season at Queen's was noticed by Newcastle United and they offered him a contract. After starring in a 6–3 home victory over St Bernard's on 19 November, Halliday had a decision to make.

With higher wages on offer and a signing-on fee, as well as his brother's massive success as a goal scoring machine at nearby Sunderland, Halliday unsurprisingly signed for Newcastle. He played alongside another ex-Queens player, Hughie Gallacher, who captained Newcastle to the 1926–27 Football League Championship. Halliday made his first team debut away to Leicester City on 27 November 1927 when he replaced the injured Tom McDonald. This proved to be his only first team game for the club.

On returning to Scotland in 1928, Halliday played for Third Lanark. He again headed south, this time to Exeter City for two seasons. He returned to Dumfries in 1933 and finished his career with Kirkcudbright club St Cuthbert Wanderers.

Some sources state that Billy Halliday played for Stockport County after Exeter City, but others assert that this was another sibling, Johnny, whose clubs also included Lincoln City and Doncaster Rovers.
