= Wilfred Adey =

English footballer

Personal information
- Full name: Wilfred Adey
- Date of birth: 6 July 1909
- Place of birth: Featherstone, England
- Date of death: 1975 (aged 65–66)
- Height: 5 ft 8 1/2 in (1.74 m)
- Position: Defender

Senior career*
Years	Team	Apps	(Gls)
- Thurcroft Church
- Thurcroft Main
	Huddersfield Town	0	(0)
- Thurcroft Main
- Norton Woodseats
1931–1933	Sheffield United	2	(0)
1934–1936	Barnsley	66	(0)
1936–1938	Carlisle United	74	(5)
1938–1940	Aberdeen	28	(0)
Total		170	(5)
- * Club domestic league appearances and goals

Wilfred Adey (6 July 1909 – 1975) was a footballer who played in The Football League for Barnsley, Carlisle United and Sheffield United, He also played for Scottish club Aberdeen for two seasons before the Second World War.
