= Bill Strauss (soccer) =

South African soccer player

Personal information
- Full name: William Henry Strauss
- Date of birth: 6 January 1916
- Place of birth: Benoni, Transvaal, South Africa
- Date of death: 16 November 1984 (aged 68)
- Place of death: Plymouth, England
- Height: 5 ft 7 in (1.70 m)
- Position: Left winger

Senior career*
Years	Team	Apps	(Gls)
1935–1946	Aberdeen	85	(45)
1946–1953	Plymouth Argyle	158	(40)
Total		243	(85)
- * Club domestic league appearances and goals

William Henry Strauss (6 January 1916 – 16 November 1984) was a South African professional footballer.

An outside left, Strauss played for Aberdeen between 1935 and 1946 and Plymouth Argyle between 1946 and 1953.

At Aberdeen, he played a role in the club's run to the 1937 Scottish Cup Final but received an injury in the semi-final and could not take part in the showpiece event, which resulted in defeat to Celtic.

During the war years he made 2 guest appearances for Clapton Orient in 1941–42.

At Plymouth, he made 166 appearances in all competitions during his time at Home Park, scoring 42 goals, before retiring in 1953 at the age of 37.

Strauss also played Minor Counties Championship matches for Devon from 1950 to 1951, scoring a century in 1950 at The Oval against Surrey Second XI.

He died in Plymouth on 16 November 1984.

== Career statistics ==
=== Appearances and goals by club, season and competition ===
Club	Season	League			National Cup		Total	
Club	Season	Division	Apps	Goals	Apps	Goals	Apps	Goals
Aberdeen	1936-37	Scottish Division One	30	24	4	6	34	30
Aberdeen	1937-38	Scottish Division One	19	5	4	2	23	7
Aberdeen	1938-39	Scottish Division One	31	12	6	3	37	15
Aberdeen	1939-40	Scottish Division One	5*	4*	-	-	5*	4*
Aberdeen	1940-41	Competitive Football Cancelled Due to WW2						
Aberdeen	1941-42	Competitive Football Cancelled Due to WW2						
Aberdeen	1942-43	Competitive Football Cancelled Due to WW2						
Aberdeen	1943-44	Competitive Football Cancelled Due to WW2						
Aberdeen	1944-45	Competitive Football Cancelled Due to WW2						
Aberdeen	1945-46	Competitive Football Cancelled Due to WW2						
Aberdeen	Total		85	45	14	11	99	56
Plymouth Argyle	1946-47	Second Division	23	11	1	0	24	11
Plymouth Argyle	1947-48	Second Division	41	5	1	0	42	5
Plymouth Argyle	1948-49	Second Division	31	10	1	0	32	10
Plymouth Argyle	1949-50	Second Division	37	10	2	0	39	10
Plymouth Argyle	1950-51	Third Division South	15	3	3	2	18	5
Plymouth Argyle	1951-52	Third Division South	9	1	0	0	9	1
Plymouth Argyle	1952-53	Second Division	0	0	0	0	0	0
Plymouth Argyle	1953-54	Second Division	2	0	0	0	2	0
Plymouth Argyle	Total		158	40	8	2	166	42
Career total			243	85	22	13	265	98

*Games played before league season was suspended
