= Jimmy Munro (footballer, born 1926) =

Scottish footballer

Personal information
- Full name: James Ferguson Munro
- Date of birth: 25 March 1926
- Place of birth: Elgin, Scotland
- Date of death: 22 June 1997 (aged 71)
- Place of death: Elgin, Scotland
- Position: Right winger

Senior career*
Years	Team	Apps	(Gls)
- Aberdeen
1946–1947	Dunfermline Athletic	18	(3)
1947–1948	Waterford United		
1948–1949	Manchester City	25	(4)
1949–1953	Oldham Athletic	119	(20)
1953–1958	Lincoln City	161	(24)
1958–1959	Bury	41	(8)
1959–1960	Weymouth		
1960–1961	Poole Town		
Total		364	(59)
- * Club domestic league appearances and goals

James Ferguson Munro (25 March 1926 – 22 June 1997) was a Scottish footballer. who played as a right winger in the English Football League.
