= Austin Collier =

English footballer (1914–1991)

Personal information
- Full name: Austin Collier
- Date of birth: 24 July 1914
- Place of birth: Dewsbury, West Riding of Yorkshire, England
- Date of death: May 1991 (aged 76)
- Place of death: Dewsbury, West Yorkshire, England
- Height: 5 ft 7 in (1.70 m)
- Position: Half-back

Senior career*
Years	Team	Apps	(Gls)
1935–1938	Upton Colliery		
1938	Frickley Colliery		
1938–1939	Mansfield Town	21	(0)
1939–1940	York City	0	(0)
1940–1941	Partick Thistle		
1941–1946	York City	10	(0)
1941	→ Celtic (loan)		
1941	→ Third Lanark (loan)		
1942–1943	→ Partick Thistle (loan)		
1943–1944	→ Partick Thistle (loan)		
1944	→ Hibernian (loan)		
1946–1947	Queen of the South	17	(0)
1947	Rochdale	6	(0)
1947–1948	Halifax Town	1	(0)
1948–1949	Goole Town		
1949–	Scarborough		
Total		55	(0)
- * Club domestic league appearances and goals

Austin Collier (24 July 1914 – May 1991) was an English professional footballer who played as a half-back in the Football League for Mansfield Town, York City, Rochdale and Halifax Town, in the Scottish Football League for Queen of the South, in non-League football for Upton Colliery, Frickley Colliery, Goole Town and Scarborough, and was on the books of Partick Thistle, Celtic, Third Lanark and Hibernian without making a league appearance. He later served as assistant manager at Halifax Town.
