= John Millar (footballer, born 1923) =

Scottish footballer

Personal information
- Full name: John Ross Millar
- Date of birth: 25 October 1923
- Place of birth: Armadale, Scotland
- Date of death: 2 February 1986 (aged 62)
- Place of death: Bathgate, Scotland
- Position: Centre forward

Senior career*
Years	Team	Apps	(Gls)
- Preston Athletic
1947–1948	Albion Rovers	4	(0)
1948–1949	Bradford City	3	(1)
- Weymouth
Total		7	(1)
- * Club domestic league appearances and goals

John Ross Millar (25 October 1923 – 2 February 1986) was a Scottish professional footballer who played as a centre forward for Preston Athletic, Albion Rovers, Bradford City and Weymouth.
