= Charlie Smith (footballer) =

Welsh footballer

Personal information
- Full name: Charles James Smith
- Date of birth: 26 August 1915
- Place of birth: Cardiff, Wales
- Date of death: 31 March 1984 (aged 68)
- Place of death: Torbay, England
- Position: Outside right

Youth career
- –1936: Exeter Toc H

Senior career*
Years	Team	Apps	(Gls)
1936–1937	Exeter City	5	(0)
1937–1938	Yeovil & Petters United		
1938–1946	Aberdeen	21	(5)
1946–1947	Torquay United	23	(0)
- * Club domestic league appearances and goals

Charles James Smith (26 August 1915 – 31 March 1984) was a Welsh professional footballer who played in the Football League for Torquay United and Exeter City as an outside right. He also played in the Scottish League for Aberdeen.

== Career statistics ==
Appearances and goals by club, season and competition
Club	Season	League			FA Cup		Other		Total	
Club	Season	Division	Apps	Goals	Apps	Goals	Apps	Goals	Apps	Goals
Aberdeen	1937–38	Scottish First Division	8	2	3	2	3 (Note: 2 appearances in Empire Exhibition Trophy, 1 appearance in Dewar Shield)	0	14	4
Aberdeen	1938–39	Scottish First Division	13	3	0	0	0	0	13	3
Career total			21	5	3	2	3	0	27	7

== Honours ==
Aberdeen

- Dewar Shield: 1939–40
