= John Cuthbertson (footballer, fl. 1939–1956) =

Scottish footballer

Personal information
- Full name: Jonathan Hunter Cairns Cuthbertson
- Place of birth: Dalkeith, Scotland
- Position: Centre forward

Youth career
- Craigmark Burntonians

Senior career*
Years	Team	Apps	(Gls)
1939–1949	Hibernian	32	(29)
1949–1953	Third Lanark	81	(39)
1953–1956	Stenhousemuir	69	(48)
Total		182	(116)

International career
1948	Scottish League XI	1	(0)
- * Club domestic league appearances and goals

John Cuthbertson was a Scottish footballer, who played for Hibernian, Third Lanark and Stenhousemuir. Cuthbertson scored for Hibernian in the 1947 Scottish Cup Final defeat by Aberdeen and helped the club win the 1947–48 Scottish League championship. It was reported that Cuthbertson scored the first Scottish Football League goal of the 1946–47 season, which meant that he scored the first competitive goal in Scottish football since the end of the Second World War.

Cuthbertson married Nancy in 1941.
