= Stan Lloyd (English footballer) =

English footballer

Personal information
- Full name: William Stanley Lloyd
- Date of birth: 1 October 1924
- Place of birth: West Auckland, England
- Date of death: 6 July 2011 (aged 86)
- Place of death: Cleethorpes, England
- Position: Winger

Senior career*
Years	Team	Apps	(Gls)
1940–1941	Silksworth Juniors		
1941–1948	Sunderland	24	(5)
1948–1953	Grimsby Town	148	(23)
1953–1954	Worksop Town		
1954–1955	Scunthorpe & Lindsey United	1	(0)
- * Club domestic league appearances and goals

William Stanley Lloyd (1 October 1924 – 6 July 2011) was an English professional footballer who played as a winger.

He died in Cleethorpes, North Lincolnshire, in 2011, aged 86.
