= Alex Kiddie =

Scottish footballer (1927–2021)

Personal information
- Full name: Alexander Anderson Kiddie
- Date of birth: 27 April 1927
- Place of birth: Dundee, Scotland
- Date of death: 27 March 2021 (aged 93)
- Place of death: Dundee, Scotland
- Height: 5 ft 8 in (1.73 m)
- Position: Outside right

Youth career
- Ashdale Boys Club

Senior career*
Years	Team	Apps	(Gls)
- Stobswell Juniors
1944–1945	Celtic	0	(0)
1945	Stobswell Juniors		
1945–1950	Aberdeen	38	(11)
1950–1952	Falkirk	3	(0)
1952–1954	Arbroath		
1954–1956	Brechin City		
1956–1957	Montrose		
1957–1958	Forfar Athletic	5	(0)
- * Club domestic league appearances and goals

Alexander Anderson Kiddie (27 April 1927 – 27 March 2021) was a Scottish footballer who played for Aberdeen, Falkirk, Arbroath, Brechin City, Montrose and Forfar Athletic as an outside right.
