= Charlie Ferguson (footballer, born 1910) =

Scottish footballer

Personal information
- Date of birth: 22 October 1910
- Place of birth: Dunfermline, Scotland
- Date of death: 16 April 1995 (aged 84)
- Height: 5 ft 10 in (1.78 m)
- Position: Inside forward

Senior career*
Years	Team	Apps	(Gls)
1933–1936	Middlesbrough	19	(7)
1936–1937	Notts County	22	(8)
1937–1939	Luton Town	29	(10)

Managerial career
- 1960–1961: Gateshead
- * Club domestic league appearances and goals

Charles Ferguson (1910–1995) was a Scottish footballer who played as an inside forward. Ferguson spent his pre-war years with Middlesbrough, Notts County and Luton Town, playing for Arbroath, Dumbarton and Aberdeen during the Second World War and Dundee United briefly after it. Moving to North Shields for work purposes, Ferguson went on to become a scout with Burnley and Sunderland.

Ferguson died in 1995 aged 84.
