= Willie Finnigan =

Scottish footballer and coach

Personal information
- Date of birth: 24 November 1912
- Place of birth: Edinburgh, Scotland
- Date of death: 23 April 2006 (aged 93)
- Position: Wing half

Youth career
- Bo'ness Cadora

Senior career*
Years	Team	Apps	(Gls)
1937–1949	Hibernian	87	(10)
1950–1952	Dunfermline Athletic	15	(3)
Total		102	(13)
- * Club domestic league appearances and goals

Willie Finnigan (24 November 1912 – 23 April 2006) was a Scottish football player and coach, who played for Hibernian and Dunfermline Athletic. Finnigan appeared for Hibernian in the 1947 Scottish Cup Final and helped the club win the 1947–48 Scottish League championship. After leaving Hibs, Finnigan became a player/coach with Dunfermline, working for manager Webber Lees.
