= George Johnstone (footballer, born 1914) =

Scottish footballer

Personal information
- Date of birth: 15 December 1914
- Place of birth: Caldercruix, Scotland
- Date of death: 11 September 1974 (aged 59)
- Height: 6 ft 0 in (1.83 m)
- Position: Goalkeeper

Youth career
- –: Bothwellhaugh Athletic

Senior career*
Years	Team	Apps	(Gls)
1934–1936	Benburb		
1936–1949	Aberdeen	155	(0)
1949	Dunfermline Athletic	5	(0)
1949–1955	Raith Rovers	110	(0)
1955–1956	Greenock Morton	7	(0)
1956–1959	Thornton Hibs		
1959–1960	Cowdenbeath		
–	Newburgh		
–	Nairn Thistle		
Total		277	(0)
- * Club domestic league appearances and goals

George Johnstone (15 December 1914 –11 September 1974) was a Scottish footballer who played as a goalkeeper. He played for Aberdeen, Dunfermline Athletic, Raith Rovers, Greenock Morton and Cowdenbeath. Johnstone appeared for Aberdeen in two Scottish Cup Finals (1937 and 1947) and a Scottish League Cup Final (1947).

== Career statistics ==
Appearances and goals by club, season and competition
Club	Season	League			Scottish Cup		League Cup		Total	
Club	Season	Division	Apps	Goals	Apps	Goals	Apps	Goals	Apps	Goals
Aberdeen	1936–37	Scottish Division One	9	0	5	0	—		14	0
Aberdeen	1937–38	Scottish Division One	38	0	4	0	—		42	0
Aberdeen	1938–39	Scottish Division One	34	0	6	0	—		40	0
Aberdeen	1939–40	Scottish Division One	5*	0	0	0	—		5*	0
Aberdeen	1940–41	Competitive Football Cancelled Due to WW2								
Aberdeen	1941–42	Competitive Football Cancelled Due to WW2								
Aberdeen	1942–43	Competitive Football Cancelled Due to WW2								
Aberdeen	1943–44	Competitive Football Cancelled Due to WW2								
Aberdeen	1944–45	Competitive Football Cancelled Due to WW2								
Aberdeen	1945–46	Competitive Football Cancelled Due to WW2								
Aberdeen	1946–47	Scottish Division One	26	0	7	0	10	0	43	0
Aberdeen	1947–48	Scottish Division One	28	0	2	0	8	0	38	0
Aberdeen	1948–49	Scottish Division One	15	0	1	0	6	0	22	0
Aberdeen	Total		155	0	25	0	24	0	204	0

*Games played before league season was suspended
