= Willie McCartney =

Scottish football referee and manager

Personal information
- Full name: William McCartney
- Date of birth: 1887 or 1888
- Date of death: January 24, 1948 (aged 60)
- Place of death: Davidson's Mains, Scotland

Managerial career
- Years: Team
- 1919–1935: Heart of Midlothian
- 1936–1948: Hibernian

William McCartney (1887 or 1888 — 24 January 1948) was a Scottish football referee and manager. He managed both of the Edinburgh derby rivals, Heart of Midlothian (Hearts) and Hibernian (Hibs).

The Sunday Herald newspaper listed McCartney in 22nd place in their 2003 list of the 50 greatest Scottish football managers, citing his role in the development of Hibs' Famous Five forward line. The newspaper also said that McCartney "was intelligent, jovial and had great presence", and described his ultimate failure to win a major trophy as "unthinkably cruel".

== Hearts manager ==
McCartney was appointed Hearts manager in November 1919, replacing his father, John. Unlike his father, Willie McCartney had never played football at a high level because he suffered an injury while playing as a youth and he initially became a referee instead. When he took the manager position at Hearts he had the task of rebuilding a team that had been decimated by the First World War, including three dead on the first day of the Battle of the Somme. Although Hearts drew big crowds during the early 1920s, the team was unsuccessful and narrowly avoided relegation in 1922.

Hearts improved through the rest of McCartney's time, particularly after the signing of prolific goalscorer Barney Battles, Jr. in 1928, but defensive frailties meant that they did not win any trophies. In 1933, McCartney asked to be relieved of clerical duties to concentrate on working with the players, but this had no discernible impact. McCartney resigned in June 1935, as the new chairman wanted a more hands-on approach to management. McCartney had signed and developed many good players, but ultimately failed to deliver success.

== Hibs manager ==
After a year out of the game, McCartney was appointed Hibs manager in 1936. Hibs had suffered a very poor period in the early 1930s, having been relegated in 1931 and failing to win promotion in 1932. Although Hibs won promotion in 1933, they only just retained Division One status in 1934 and 1936. McCartney's appointment produced some excitement, as Hibs drew a crowd of 25,000 for his first match in charge. Hibs again struggled in his first season, as McCartney tried to find the right blend of the many new signings he had made. McCartney developed a strong group of younger players, but the club suffered a humiliating defeat in the 1937–38 Scottish Cup by Edinburgh City. Hibs put up a much better effort in the 1938–39 Scottish Cup, but were beaten 1–0 by eventual winners Clyde in the semi-final.

Just as it appeared McCartney was building a good team, with The Scotsman predicting a good 1939–40 season for Hibs, the Second World War started. The Scottish Football League abandoned competition after five games of the league season, with only friendlies outside "danger areas" (major central belt towns and cities) allowed. These restrictions were soon relaxed to allow games to be played in the cities, subject to Home Office permission, but the league was regionalised. Hibs used the war years productively, however. Gordon Smith and Bobby Combe were signed in 1941, even though Hearts had been watching both players. Soon afterwards, Smith scored a hat-trick for Hibs against Hearts at Tynecastle. Combe also scored in a 5–3 win for Hibs. At the same time, McCartney attracted guest players including Matt Busby and Bobby Baxter.

Hibs won the Summer Cup in 1941, defeating Rangers in the final. Rangers were the dominant club during the war, winning every Southern League competition and six of the ten cup competitions. McCartney's Hibs were their main challengers, winning two of the other four cups, and winning an equal share of the league points contested between the two sides. The guest players moved on at the end of the war in 1945, but McCartney continued to build the side. Willie Ormond and Eddie Turnbull were signed during the 1946–47 season, while a young Lawrie Reilly also signed in that season. McCartney technically wasn't allowed to sign the 16-year-old Reilly, but got around the regulation by keeping the signing form in his desk until Reilly's 17th birthday.

Hibs finished that season as runners-up in both of the main competitions, second to Rangers in the league and 2–1 losers to Aberdeen in the 1947 Scottish Cup Final. Hibs started the 1947–48 season strongly, and were top of the league in January ahead of a key match against Rangers at Ibrox. The week before, Hibs played Albion Rovers in the 1947–48 Scottish Cup at Cliftonhill. Hibs won an unremarkable match 2–0, but manager McCartney had collapsed and died later that day. Trainer Hugh Shaw was appointed as McCartney's replacement, and Hibs went on to win the league that season. Shaw completed the Famous Five lineup by signing Bobby Johnstone, and the team won further league championships in 1951 and 1952.
