= Hugh Howie =

Scottish footballer

Personal information
- Date of birth: 14 February 1924
- Place of birth: Glasgow, Scotland
- Date of death: 14 January 1958 (aged 33)
- Place of death: Cambuslang, Scotland
- Position: Defender

Youth career
- Hallside Juveniles
- –1943: Newton Juniors

Senior career*
Years	Team	Apps	(Gls)
1943–1954	Hibernian	140	(0)

International career
1948	Scotland	1	(1)
- * Club domestic league appearances and goals

Hugh Howie (14 February 1924 – 14 January 1958) was a Scottish footballer who played for Newton Juniors, Hibernian and the Scotland national team.

Howie, born in Glasgow, was a defender and joined Hibernian from Newton Juniors in 1943 and remained at Easter Road for the remainder of his career. He was part of the Hibs team that won three League Championships in 1947–48, 1950–51 and 1951–52. He scored in his only Scotland cap, a 3–1 win over Wales in October 1948.

He was forced to retire from football in 1954 for medical reasons, having contracted tuberculosis. He became a journalist, but died in a car accident in 1958.
