= Archie Baird =

Scottish footballer

Personal information
- Full name: Archibald MacKechnie Baird
- Date of birth: 8 May 1919
- Place of birth: Rutherglen, Scotland
- Date of death: 3 November 2009 (aged 90)
- Place of death: Aberdeen, Scotland
- Position: Inside forward

Youth career
- Rutherglen Glencairn
- Strathclyde
- 1938–1939: Aberdeen

Senior career*
| Years | Team | Apps | (Gls) |
| 1940 | → Leeds United (guest) | 1 | (0) |
| 1946–1953 | Aberdeen | 104 | (26) |
| 1953–1956 | St Johnstone | 77 | (3) |
| Total | | 182 | (29) |

International career
| 1946 | Scotland | 1 | (0) |
- * Club domestic league appearances and goals

Archibald MacKechnie Baird (8 May 1919 – 3 November 2009) was a Scottish footballer who played for Aberdeen and St Johnstone. He was also capped once by the Scotland national football team.

== Playing career ==
Baird was born in Rutherglen. Having played for local Junior clubs in the area, he signed for Aberdeen before the Second World War (along with Willie Waddell, although it was the other player of the same name who had been his teammate at Strathclyde), but the war started before he had made the first team. He joined the British Army, but was captured and held as a prisoner of war. He escaped and lived with an Italian family as their "son". In 1989, he published an autobiography, Family of Four, which described these experiences.

Baird returned to Aberdeen before the end of the war. His good form in this period earned him selection for Scotland in a friendly match against Belgium in early 1946. Baird was one of nine Scotland players making their international debut in the match, with only Jimmy Delaney having significant experience. Of those nine debutants, five players did not make another international appearance, including Baird.

Baird helped Aberdeen win the Southern League Cup (a forerunner of the Scottish League Cup) in 1946 and the 1947 Scottish Cup, but his appearances were restricted by injuries. In all he made 104 league appearances for Aberdeen, scoring 26 goals in those matches. He was transferred in 1953 to St Johnstone, where he played for three seasons before retiring in 1956.

== Later life and family ==
After retiring as a player, Baird worked as a teacher and a sports journalist. His sister, journalist Mamie Baird, married TV broadcaster Magnus Magnusson; Archie is the uncle of their children, TV producer Jon Magnusson and TV news presenter Sally Magnusson.

Baird celebrated his 90th birthday in May 2009, at which point he was Aberdeen's oldest living former player; he died on 3 November 2009, aged 90.

== Career statistics ==
=== Club ===
Appearances and goals by club, season and competition
| Club | Season | League | | | National Cup | | League Cup | | Total | |
| Club | Season | Division | Apps | Goals | Apps | Goals | Apps | Goals | Apps | Goals |
|---|---|---|---|---|---|---|---|---|---|---|
| Leeds United | 1939–40 | North East League | 1* | 0 | 0 | 0 | 0 | 0 | 1* | 0 |
| Aberdeen | 1938–39 | Scottish Division One | 0 | 0 | 0 | 0 | 0 | 0 | 0 | 0 |
| Aberdeen | 1939–40 | Scottish Division One | 0 | 0 | 0 | 0 | 0 | 0 | 0 | 0 |
| Aberdeen | 1944–45 | No league football was played during the Second World War | | | | | | | | |
| Aberdeen | 1945–46 | No league football was played during the Second World War | | | | | | | | |
| Aberdeen | 1946–47 | Scottish Division One | 14 | 6 | 3 | 0 | 2 | 1 | 19 | 7 |
| Aberdeen | 1947–48 | Scottish Division One | 13 | 3 | 2 | 0 | 7 | 4 | 22 | 7 |
| Aberdeen | 1948–49 | Scottish Division One | 7 | 1 | 0 | 0 | 0 | 0 | 7 | 1 |
| Aberdeen | 1949–50 | Scottish Division One | 18 | 6 | 5 | 0 | 0 | 0 | 23 | 6 |
| Aberdeen | 1950–51 | Scottish Division One | 27 | 5 | 3 | 1 | 10 | 4 | 40 | 10 |
| Aberdeen | 1951–52 | Scottish Division One | 23 | 5 | 4 | 1 | 0 | 0 | 27 | 6 |
| Aberdeen | 1952–53 | Scottish Division One | 2 | 0 | 0 | 0 | 4 | 0 | 6 | 0 |
| Aberdeen | Total | | 104 | 26 | 17 | 2 | 23 | 9 | 144 | 37 |
| St Johnstone | 1953–54 | Scottish Division Two | | | - | - | - | - | | |
| St Johnstone | 1954–55 | Scottish Division Two | | | - | - | - | - | | |
| St Johnstone | 1955–56 | Scottish Division Two | | | - | - | - | - | | |
| St Johnstone | Total | | 77 | 3 | - | - | - | - | 77+ | 3+ |
| Career total | | | 182 | 29 | 17+ | 2+ | 23+ | 9+ | 222+ | 40+ |

* Unofficial wartime appearances

=== International ===
Appearances and goals by national team and year
| National team | Year | Apps | Goals |
|---|---|---|---|
| Scotland | 1946 | 1 | 0 |
| Total | | 1 | 0 |

== Bibliography ==
- Baird, Archie (1989). Family of Four. Mainstream Publishing. ISBN 1-85158-235-5.
