= Jimmy Kerr (footballer, born 1919) =

Scottish footballer (1919–2001)

Personal information
- Date of birth: 1919
- Place of birth: Ormiston, Scotland
- Date of death: 27 May 2001 (aged 81–82)
- Position: Goalkeeper

Youth career
- Ormiston Primrose

Senior career*
Years	Team	Apps	(Gls)
1938–1952	Hibernian	111	(0)
	Queen of the South	0	(0)
Total		111	(0)
- * Club domestic league appearances and goals

Jimmy Kerr (1919 – 27 May 2001) was a Scottish football goalkeeper, who played for Hibernian and Queen of the South.

== Career ==
Kerr appeared for Hibernian in the 1947 Scottish Cup Final and helped the club win the 1947–48 Scottish League championship. His good form for Hibs caused understudy George Farm to leave Hibs for Blackpool.

After retiring as a player, Kerr went into business with Tom Hart. Kerr, like Hart, served on the Hibs board of directors.
