= George Green (footballer, born 1914) =

English footballer (1914–1995)

Personal information
- Full name: George Frederick Green
- Date of birth: 22 December 1914
- Place of birth: Northowram, England
- Date of death: June 1995 (aged 80–81)
- Place of death: Halifax, England
- Height: 5 ft 7 in (1.70 m)
- Position: Wing half

Senior career*
Years	Team	Apps	(Gls)
1936–1937	Bradford Park Avenue	2	(0)
1946–1947	Huddersfield Town	9	(1)
1947–1949	Reading	44	(6)
- * Club domestic league appearances and goals

George Frederick Green (22 December 1914 – June 1995) was a professional footballer, who played for Bradford Park Avenue, Huddersfield Town & Reading. He was born in Northowram, in the West Riding of Yorkshire.
