= Pat McKenna (footballer) =

Scottish footballer (1920–1995)

Personal information
- Full name: Patrick McKenna
- Date of birth: 26 April 1920
- Place of birth: Glasgow, Scotland
- Date of death: 16 November 1995 (aged 75)
- Place of death: Aberdeen, Scotland
- Height: 5 ft 8 in (1.73 m)
- Position: Defender

Youth career
- Blantyre Celtic

Senior career*
Years	Team	Apps	(Gls)
1946–1952	Aberdeen	133	(0)
1952–1953	Plymouth Argyle	1	(0)
1953–1954	St Johnstone	3	(0)
Total		137	(0)
- * Club domestic league appearances and goals

Patrick McKenna (26 April 1920 – 16 November 1995) was a Scottish football defender. He played for Aberdeen, Plymouth Argyle and St Johnstone. From St Johnstone FC, he moved into the Scottish Highland Football League, firstly, with Keith FC, then onto Fraserburgh FC for four seasons where he finished his professional football career at 40 years of age in May 1960. McKenna appeared for Aberdeen in one Scottish Cup Final and one Scottish League Cup Final during the late 1940s.

== Career statistics ==
Appearances and goals by club, season and competition
Club	Season	League			National Cup		League Cup		Total	
Club	Season	Division	Apps	Goals	Apps	Goals	Apps	Goals	Apps	Goals
Aberdeen	1944–45	Competitive Football Cancelled Due to WW2								
Aberdeen	1945–46	Competitive Football Cancelled Due to WW2								
Aberdeen	1946–47	Scottish Division One	24	0	7	0	10	0	41	0
Aberdeen	1947–48	Scottish Division One	30	0	2	0	8	0	40	0
Aberdeen	1948–49	Scottish Division One	26	0	1	0	4	0	31	0
Aberdeen	1949–50	Scottish Division One	28	0	5	0	6	0	39	0
Aberdeen	1950–51	Scottish Division One	13	0	2	0	0	0	15	0
Aberdeen	1951–52	Scottish Division One	12	0	0	0	0	0	12	0
Aberdeen	Total		133	0	17	0	28	0	178	0
Plymouth Argyle	1952–53	Second Division	1	0	0	0	0	0	1	0
St Johnstone	1953–54	Scottish Second Division	3	0	0	0	0	0	3	0
Career total			137	0	17	0	28	0	182	0
