= Hutton Bremner =

Scottish footballer

Personal information
- Full name: Thomas Hutton Bremner
- Date of birth: 18 July 1912
- Place of birth: Cathcart, Scotland
- Date of death: 12 September 1969 (aged 57)
- Place of death: Glasgow, Scotland
- Height: 5 ft 9 in (1.75 m)
- Position: Inside forward

Senior career*
Years	Team	Apps	(Gls)
1929–1935	Queen's Park	142	(31)
1935–1945	Motherwell	119	(35)
1945–1946	Aberdeen	0	(0)
1946–1947	Hamilton Academical	15	(4)
Total		257	(67)

International career
1931–1935	Scotland Amateurs	6	(2)
1934	Scottish League XI	1	(0)
- * Club domestic league appearances and goals

Thomas Hutton Bremner (18 July 1912 – 12 September 1969) was a Scottish footballer who played in the Scottish League for Queen's Park, Motherwell and Hamilton Academical as an inside forward. He represented Scotland at amateur level and made one appearance for the Scottish League XI. Bremner was described as "a naturally clever footballer, versatile enough to play in any of the forward positions".

== Personal life ==
Bremner's younger brother Gordon also became a professional footballer. Bremner served as a lieutenant in the Seaforth Highlanders during the Second World War and saw action during the Italian Campaign.

== Honours ==
Aberdeen

- Mitchell Cup: 1944–45

== Career statistics ==
Appearances and goals by club, season and competition
Club	Season	League			Scottish Cup		League Cup		Other		Total	
Club	Season	Division	Apps	Goals	Apps	Goals	Apps	Goals	Apps	Goals	Apps	Goals
Queen's Park	1929–30	Scottish First Division	3	0	0	0	―		0	0	3	0
Queen's Park	1930–31	Scottish First Division	28	6	1	0	―		1 (Note: Appearance in Glasgow Cup)	0	30	6
Queen's Park	1931–32	Scottish First Division	29	3	2	0	―		1 (Note: Appearance in Glasgow Merchants Charity Cup)	1	32	4
Queen's Park	1932–33	Scottish First Division	26	7	1	1	―		3 (Note: 2 appearances in Glasgow Merchants Charity Cup, 1 appearance in Glasgow Cup)	0	30	8
Queen's Park	1933–34	Scottish First Division	24	7	1	0	―		1	0	26	7
Queen's Park	1934–35	Scottish First Division	32	7	2	0	―		2	0	36	7
Queen's Park	Total		142	31	7	1	―		8	1	157	33
Motherwell	1935–36	Scottish First Division	32	9	4	0	―		―		36	9
Motherwell	1936–37	Scottish First Division	23	4	4	3	―		―		27	7
Motherwell	1937–38	Scottish First Division	31	10	5	3	―		―		36	13
Motherwell	1938–39	Scottish First Division	33	12	7	2	―		―		40	14
Motherwell	Total		119	35	20	8	―		―		139	43
Hamilton Academical	1946–47	Scottish First Division	15	4	1	0	6	3	―		22	7
Career total			276	70	28	9	6	3	8	1	318	83
