= George Taylor (footballer, born 1915) =

Scottish footballer and coach (1915–1982)

Personal information
- Full name: George Alexander Taylor
- Date of birth: 9 June 1915
- Place of birth: King Edward, Scotland
- Date of death: 1 June 1982 (aged 66)
- Place of death: Plymouth, England
- Height: 5 ft 9 in (1.75 m)
- Position: Wing half

Youth career
- Hall Russell's

Senior career*
Years	Team	Apps	(Gls)
1937–1948	Aberdeen	63	(6)
1948–1950	Plymouth Argyle	48	(2)
Total		111	(8)
- * Club domestic league appearances and goals

George Alexander Taylor (9 June 1915 – June 1982) was a Scottish football player and coach, who played for Aberdeen and Plymouth Argyle. He appeared for Aberdeen in the Scottish Cup and the Scottish League Cup finals during the 1946–47 season. After retiring as a player in 1952, he joined the Plymouth Argyle coaching staff.

== Career statistics ==
Appearances and goals by club, season and competition
Club	Season	League			Scottish Cup		League Cup		Total	
Club	Season	Division	Apps	Goals	Apps	Goals	Apps	Goals	Apps	Goals
Aberdeen	1937–38	Scottish Division One	1	0	0	0	–	–	1	0
Aberdeen	1938–39	Scottish Division One	5	0	0	0	–	–	5	0
Aberdeen	1939–40	Scottish Division One	0	0	0	0	–	–	0	0
Aberdeen	1940–41	Competitive Football Cancelled Due to WW2								
Aberdeen	1941–42	Competitive Football Cancelled Due to WW2								
Aberdeen	1942–43	Competitive Football Cancelled Due to WW2								
Aberdeen	1943–44	Competitive Football Cancelled Due to WW2								
Aberdeen	1944–45	Competitive Football Cancelled Due to WW2								
Aberdeen	1945–46	Competitive Football Cancelled Due to WW2								
Aberdeen	1946–47	Scottish Division One	28	3	6	0	3	0	37	3
Aberdeen	1947–48	Scottish Division One	29	3	2	0	8	0	39	3
Aberdeen	Total		63	6	8	0	11	0	82	6
Plymouth Argyle	1948–49	Second Division	26	1	0	0	0	0	26	1
Plymouth Argyle	1949–50	Second Division	22	1	0	0	0	0	22	1
Plymouth Argyle	Total		48	2	0	0	0	0	48	2
Career total			111	8	8	0	11	0	130	8
