= Stan Williams (soccer, born 1919) =

South African footballer

Personal information
- Full name: Alfred Stanley Williams
- Date of birth: 1 May 1919
- Place of birth: Cape Town, South Africa
- Date of death: 12 June 2007 (aged 88)
- Place of death: Johannesburg, South Africa
- Position: Winger

Youth career
- Cape Town Railway

Senior career*
Years	Team	Apps	(Gls)
1937–1949	Aberdeen	72	(20)
1940–1941	→ Dumbarton (wartime guest)	28	(11)
	→ Clyde (wartime guest)	??	(??)
1949–1950	Plymouth Argyle	35	(4)
1950–1952	Dundee	28	(4)
Total		163+	(39+)

International career
1941	Scotland (wartime)	1	(0)
- * Club domestic league appearances and goals

Alfred Stanley Williams (1 May 1919 – 12 June 2007) was a South African football player. Williams played for Aberdeen, Plymouth Argyle and Dundee. He scored the winning goal for Aberdeen in the 1947 Scottish Cup Final, and also appeared in the Scottish League Cup Final during the same season.

== Career statistics ==
=== Appearances and goals by club, season and competition ===
Club	Season	League			National Cup		League Cup		Total	
Club	Season	Division	Apps	Goals	Apps	Goals	Apps	Goals	Apps	Goals
Aberdeen	1937-38	Scottish Division One	1	0	0	0	-	-	1	0
Aberdeen	1938-39	Scottish Division One	5	3	0	0	-	-	5	3
Aberdeen	1939-40	Scottish Division One	0	0	0	0	-	-	0	0
Aberdeen	1940-41	Competitive Football Cancelled Due to WW2								
Aberdeen	1941-42	Competitive Football Cancelled Due to WW2								
Aberdeen	1942-43	Competitive Football Cancelled Due to WW2								
Aberdeen	1943-44	Competitive Football Cancelled Due to WW2								
Aberdeen	1944-45	Competitive Football Cancelled Due to WW2								
Aberdeen	1945-46	Competitive Football Cancelled Due to WW2								
Aberdeen	1946-47	Scottish Division One	23	5	7	6	9	0	39	11
Aberdeen	1947-48	Scottish Division One	17	6	2	0	4	7	23	13
Aberdeen	1948-49	Scottish Division One	26	6	1	0	4	1	31	7
Aberdeen	Total		72	20	10	6	17	8	99	34
Dumbarton (wartime guest)	1940-41	Scottish Southern League	28*	11*	0	0	6*	5*	34*	16*
Clyde (wartime guest)	-	Scottish Southern League	-	-	-	-	-	-	-	-
Plymouth Argyle	1949-50	Second Division	35	4	2	1	-	-	37	5
Plymouth Argyle	Total		35	4	2	1	-	-	37	5
Dundee	1950-51	Scottish Division One	21	3	0	0	1	0	22	3
Dundee	1951-52	Scottish Division One	7	1	0	0	3	1	10	2
Dundee	Total		28	4	0	0	4	1	32	5
Career total			163+	39+	12+	7+	27+	14+	202+	60+

* Unofficial wartime appearances
