= Dave Halliday =

Scottish footballer (1901–1970)

Personal information
- Date of birth: 11 December 1901
- Place of birth: Dumfries, Scotland
- Date of death: 5 January 1970 (aged 68)
- Position: Forward

Senior career*
Years	Team	Apps	(Gls)
1920	Queen of the South		
1920–1921	St Mirren	13	(2)
1921–1925	Dundee	126	(90)
1925–1929	Sunderland	166	(156)
1929–1930	Arsenal	15	(8)
1930–1933	Manchester City	76	(47)
1933–1935	Clapton Orient	53	(33)
1936–1937	Yeovil and Petters United		
Total		449	(336)

International career
1924	Scottish Football League XI	1	(0)

Managerial career
- 1936–1937: Yeovil and Petters United
- 1937–1955: Aberdeen
- 1955–1958: Leicester City
- * Club domestic league appearances and goals

David Halliday (11 December 1901 – 5 January 1970) was a Scottish football player and manager. He achieved numerous distinctions and high rankings as a prolific goal-scoring forward with six senior clubs; St Mirren, Dundee, Sunderland, Arsenal, Manchester City and Clapton Orient. He bookended his senior career playing at then non-league Queen of the South and Yeovil and Petters United. Halliday's three goals in the FA Cup proper for Yeovil give him a career total of 368 senior goals. From being player-manager at Yeovil, he went on to win trophies managing Aberdeen and Leicester City.

He is the most recent of only two players to be outright top scorer in both Scottish and English football's top divisions, with 38 Dundee goals in 1923–24 and 43 Sunderland goals in 1928–29. He is the quickest player in history to 100 goals in English football's top division, taking 101 games when at Sunderland. He is the only player to score 30 or more goals in four consecutive seasons in English football's top division (achieved again when at Sunderland). He scored at least 35 league goals in each of those four seasons. He is Sunderland's most prolific goals-per-game striker with 165 goals from 175 games. His 211 goals in English football's top division with Sunderland, Arsenal and Manchester City ranks him the 20th highest scorer at that level. Of the 27 players to have scored 200 or more goals in English football's top division, only Dixie Dean scored at a more prolific rate at that level.

Managing Aberdeen, he won the 1946–47 Scottish Cup and the 1954–55 Scottish Football League. He managed Leicester City to promotion to the top division in England from winning the 1956–57 Football League Second Division.

== Playing career ==
=== Early years and Queen of the South ===
Halliday was born in Dumfries and started in local schools football where he featured on the left wing. He firstly attended Noblehill Primary School and thereafter Dumfries Academy. Halliday then worked with car manufacturer Arrol-Johnston and played for the company's team. This side was one of three who merged to form Queen of the South in 1919. However, despite having played in the new club's trial matches, Halliday did not join Queens until 17 January 1920 as he had a brief spell with Tayleurians. After joining the club, Halliday played 19 games until the season's end in May 1920.

In Queens's first season their fixtures consisted of challenge games and local cup competitions, including the Dumfries Charity Cup which was played over three weekends in May. On 8 May in the first game, Queens thrashed Dumfries 7–1. A week later they saw off Solway Star 4–0 in the semi-final. They then faced up in the final against side Dalbeattie Star. A then-record crowd of 4,500 (with many others situated upon the stadium's roof) watched the game. An early Halliday shot went wide following good link up play with Ian Dickson. However it was Dalbeattie with their physical style of play who took the lead. Queens equalised through Willie McCall before Halliday's play became fruitful. One shot hit the post, another went inches wide before he put Queens ahead five minutes before half time. Connell hit a third a minute into the second half before Halliday beat Borthwick to cross for McCall who scored a fourth goal.

Halliday in all scored 13 goals in 19 games for the Doonhamers while playing at outside left. In 1924 Halliday's 16-year-old brother Billy joined Queen of the South.

=== St Mirren ===
Halliday was asked to sign by St Mirren after the cup final win over Dalbeattie. He requested time to consider the offer before agreeing, with a stipulation that he continued working with Arrol-Johnston and travelled to Paisley on match days. In season 1920–21, as a part-time member of the playing staff, he scored two goals in 13 league games.

=== Dundee ===
Halliday next joined Dundee in 1921, for whom Scotland internationalist Alex Troup played on the left wing. Halliday was thus moved to centre forwards and quickly became one of the most prolific players in the game. He finished as Scottish top scorer in 1923–24 with a return of 38 goals from his 36 top division appearances; remains the club record all-time seasonal league goalscoring record. Halliday scored in the 3-0 1924–25 Scottish Cup tie victory over Airdrieonians whose team contained Hughie Gallacher, Bob McPhail and Willie Russell. Dundee progressed to the 1925 Scottish Cup Final in which, after leading at half-time, they lost 2–1 to a last minute goal by Celtic's Jimmy McGrory. Halliday scored 90 goals in 126 league appearances for the Dees, with another 13 goals from 21 Scottish Cup games in four seasons.

While at Dens Park he was capped for the Scottish Football League XI in a 1–1 draw against the English League at Ibrox Park in March 1924. In end-of-season tours with Dundee, Halliday scored doubles against each of Athletic Bilbao, Real Madrid, Valencia CF and FC Barcelona.

=== Sunderland ===
In 1925 Halliday joined Sunderland who paid £4,000 for his services. Replacing Charlie Buchan in the team, Halliday instantly became even more prolific south of the border than in the north. He hit his first 100 goals for Sunderland in just 101 games, and remains the quickest player to s century of English top division league goals. His 43 goals in 1928–29 made him top scorer in England's top division that season, making him the most recent of only two players to have been outright top scorer in the top divisions of both Scotland and England (the other was David McLean). He scored at least 35 league goals in each of the four full seasons he spent at Sunderland, and is the only player at any club to score 30 or more league goals in four consecutive seasons in England's top division. His lowest full seasonal league tally of 35 goals is higher than any other Sunderland player has achieved in their best season. Hence Halliday has the top four season-by-season league goal scoring tallies at Sunderland.

Halliday has a Sunderland goals to games ratio of 0.94, the highest of any striker in the club's history. He struck 165 goals in 175 games for the Black Cats comprising 156 league goals from 166 games and nine in nine FA Cup outings. He scored 12 league hat-tricks, more than any other player. He scored 4 goals in a game on three occasions. He is also Sunderland's third highest goalscorer of all time. His 165 Sunderland goals were all in his first 168 games at Roker Park before scoring in none of his last seven games.

Despite Halliday's goals feats with Sunderland, he managed no better than third place in the league with the club, achieved in the 1925–26 and 1926–27 seasons. While at Sunderland in November 1927, Halliday's brother Billy joined nearby rivals Newcastle United.

=== Arsenal ===
In 1929 Halliday was signed by Arsenal. He debuted against Birmingham City on 9 November 1929. Halliday endured a relatively goalless start for him, playing in an Arsenal team off-form largely attributed at the time to injury affecting key playmaker Alex James. Manager Herbert Chapman tried different combinations in attack before James, and subsequently the rest of the team, began to find form in late January. Jack Lambert had been recalled at centre-forward. With Arsenal's form in upswing, Lambert remained Chapman's first choice for the number 9 jersey for the rest of the season with Halliday only an occasional first teamer, though he played in the 6–6 record scoring game against Leicester City on Easter Monday 21 April 1930. Halliday scored four putting him on six goals from his four most recent first team games at that point.

Arsenal's next game after the Leicester match was the 1930 FA Cup Final. Chapman recalled Jack Lambert at centre-forward for the final, and the decision was vindicated with James and Lambert scoring in the 2–0 win over Chapman's previous club, Huddersfield Town. Chapman started the league campaign the next season with the five forwards from the cup final. Arsenal scored 127 goals in 42 games winning the league by seven points in the era of the two points for a win. Halliday scored regularly playing for the reserves (39 goals in 29 reserve games in his year at Arsenal), but with Lambert top scoring for the first team with 38 goals in 1930–31, Halliday stayed out of the first team.

Halliday's four-goal game against Leicester was his last Arsenal first team appearance. He scored 8 goals in 15 games for Arsenal (and also played in a game against Middlesbrough which was abandoned after 55 minutes and hence is not counted in official statistics).

=== Manchester City ===
Halliday signed for Manchester City in November 1930, a year after joining Arsenal, for a fee of £5,700. At City, Halliday hit 47 goals in 76 league games as well as four goals from six cup appearances that took City to the 1931–32 FA Cup semi-finals when they lost to a last-minute Arsenal goal. He scored a hat-trick against former club Sunderland in just ten minutes in January 1932. Halliday though missed the 1933 FA Cup Final, which City lost to Everton.

=== Clapton Orient ===
Halliday saw out his senior playing career with Clapton Orient between December 1933 and June 1935. He top scored for Orient in both seasons in which he played there despite arriving in late December. In his 18 months there he hit 36 strikes in 56 competitive first team games.

=== Yeovil & Petters United ===
After leaving Orient, Halliday became player-manager of non-league Yeovil & Petters United. He top scored in both his full seasons there with 22 and 47 goals respectively. He also scored a further three goals in the FA Cup proper. In that run they defeated Ipswich Town and Gainsborough Trinity to reach the third round playing against Manchester United at Old Trafford. He had already reached agreement between Yeovil and Aberdeen that he would take over as Aberdeen manager immediately after the Manchester United tie.

== Managerial career ==
=== Aberdeen ===
Halliday was appointed manager of Aberdeen on 22 December 1937 but did not take over the reins until after Yeovil's FA Cup tie at Manchester United in January 1938. He led the Dons to a 3–2 victory against Rangers in the 1945–46 Southern League Cup Final; this a national competition in all but name and predecessor to the Scottish League Cup launched the season after. Halliday then guided Aberdeen to 1946–47 Scottish Cup success, defeating the emerging Hibernian team who were on course to become Scottish league champions in three of the next five seasons. This was the first major trophy won by the club. He returned to the Scottish Cup Final again in 1953, losing a replay 1–0 to Rangers, then in 1954 was Scottish Cup runner-up again, this time losing 2–1 to Celtic. He led Aberdeen to their first-ever Scottish Football League title in 1954–55. Only Alex Ferguson has since taken Aberdeen to the Scottish League title.

=== Leicester City ===
After leaving Aberdeen in 1955 Halliday spent three years at the helm of Leicester City, guiding them to the 1956–57 Second Division title. Although Halliday left in 1958, the 1957 promotion was the beginning of Leicester's longest run to date in the England's top division, 12 seasons.

== After management ==
Halliday returned to the Aberdeen area and scouted for Leicester City in northeast Scotland. He died on 5 January 1970, aged 68.

== Playing statistics, records and rankings ==
Excluding Queen of the South figures as they were non-league until 1923–24, Dave Halliday scored 92 league goals in Scotland in 139 appearances and a further 13 in 21 Scottish Cup appearances. In England he scored 244 league goals in 310 appearances and a further 16 FA Cup goals in 18 appearances with league clubs. He also scored an FA Cup hat-trick for Yeovil, for a total of 368 first class goals. It is worth noting that a large chunk of his career was spent playing under the old offside rule and that all his league goals bar the season and a half with Clapton Orient in the Third Division South were scored in the top flight in both Scotland and England.

- Fastest player to 100 English Top Division Goals: 101 games
- Only player to score at least 30 English top division goals in 4 consecutive seasons: 1925–1929 at Sunderland
- 19th highest scorer in English football's top division: 211 goals at Sunderland, Arsenal and Manchester City
- Second most prolific English football goals per game strike rate of the 27 players to score 200 or more English top division goals at that level: 0.82 goals per game behind Dixie Dean's 0.86 goals per game
- In the list of footballers with the combined highest number of league goals in England and Scotland from all senior divisions, Halliday is 10th with 336 goals from 449 games.
- Sunderland highest all time season by season league goal scoring positions, Halliday takes all 4 top slots: 1) 1928–29, 43 goals; 2) 1925–26, 38 goals; 3) 1926–27, 36 goals; 4) 1927–28, 35 goals
- Sunderland most prolific goals per game striker: 165 goals from 175 = 0.94 goals per game
- Sunderland all-time highest goal scorers: 3rd
- Sunderland player with the highest number of scoring three goals in a game: 1st (12 three goal games). He also scored 4 goals in a game 3 times
- His 211 English top division goals make him the highest scorer at that level never to receive a full international cap. He was consistently overlooked by the selectors for the Scottish national side, usually in favour of another player who started at Queen of the South, Hughie Gallacher. The only other player to score 200 English top division goals and never receive an international cap is Leicester's Arthur Chandler.
- Dundee highest all time seasonal league goals record: 38 (1923–24)

== Career statistics ==
Appearances and goals by club, season and competition
Club	Season	League			FA Cup		Total	
Club	Season	Division	Apps	Goals	Apps	Goals	Apps	Goals
St Mirren	1920–21	Scottish Division 1	13	2	0	0	13	2
Dundee	1921–22	Scottish Division 1	28	23	3	2	31	25
Dundee	1922–23	Scottish Division 1	26	10	8	5	34	15
Dundee	1923–24	Scottish Division 1	36	38	3	1	39	39
Dundee	1924–25	Scottish Division 1	36	19	7	5	43	24
Dundee	Total		126	90	21	13	147	103
Sunderland	1925–26	First Division	42	38	4	4	46	42
Sunderland	1926–27	First Division	33	36	1	1	34	37
Sunderland	1927–28	First Division	38	35	3	4	41	39
Sunderland	1928–29	First Division	42	43	1	0	43	43
Sunderland	1929–30	First Division	11	4	0	0	11	4
Sunderland	Total		166	156	9	9	175	165
Arsenal	1929–30	First Division	15	8	0	0	15	8
Manchester City	1930–31	First Division	24	14	1	0	25	14
Manchester City	1931–32	First Division	40	28	5	4	45	32
Manchester City	1932–33	First Division	8	3	0	0	8	3
Manchester City	1933–34	First Division	4	2	0	0	4	2
Manchester City	Total		76	47	6	4	82	51
Clapton Orient	1933–34	Third Division South	21	19	1	0	22	19
Clapton Orient	1934–35	Third Division South	32	14	2	3	34	17
Career total			449	336	39	29	488	365

=== Goals at then non-league clubs ===
Season(s)	Club	Apps	Goals
1919–20	Queen of the South	19	13
1935–1938	Yeovil and Petters United	?	?

- Halliday's three goals for Yeovil in the FA Cup proper give him a career total of 368 senior goals

== Managerial statistics ==
As of 6 December 2013

Team	Nat	From	To	Record				
Team	Nat	From	To	G	W	D	L	Win %
Yeovil and Petters United	England	1936	1937					
Aberdeen	Scotland	1937	1955	386	188	65	133	48.7
Leicester City	England	1955	1958	145	64	27	54	44.14

- no statistics available for Yeovil and Petters United.

== Honours ==
=== Player ===
Queen of the South

- Dumfries Charity Cup: 1919–20

Dundee

- Scottish Cup runner-up: 1924–25
- Forfarshire Cup: 1922–23, 1924–25

=== Manager ===
Yeovil and Petters Utd

- Southern League Cup runner-up: 1937–38
- Somerset Professional Cup runner-up: 1936–37

Aberdeen

- Scottish Football League: 1954–55
- Scottish Cup: 1946–47; runner-up: 1952–53, 1953–54
- Scottish League Cup: runner-up 1946–47
- Southern League Cup: 1945–46

Leicester City

- Football League Second Division: 1956–57

=== Individual ===
- Scottish Top Division Golden Boot: 1924
- English Top Division Golden Boot: 1929
- Most recent of only two players to have been outright top scorer in both the Scottish and English top divisions

== See also ==
- List of English football first tier top scorers
- List of footballers in England by number of league goals
- List of men's footballers with 500 or more goals
- List of Scottish football families
