= Willie McCall (footballer, born 1920) =

Scottish footballer

Personal information
- Date of birth: 14 November 1920
- Place of birth: Glasgow, Scotland
- Date of death: 1 June 1985 (aged 64)
- Place of death: Glasgow, Scotland
- Height: 1.65 m (5 ft 5 in)
- Position: Winger

Senior career*
Years	Team	Apps	(Gls)
1943–1946	Hamilton Academical	0	(0)
1946–1947	Aberdeen	42	(8)
1947–1948	Newcastle United	16	(4)
1948–1950	Motherwell	28	(8)
1950–1952	Third Lanark	21	(5)
1952–1953	Worcester City	0	(0)
1953–1954	Arbroath	13	(5)
Total		120	(30)
- * Club domestic league appearances and goals

Willie McCall (14 November 1920 – 1 June 1985) was a Scottish footballer. He played for Hamilton Academical, Aberdeen, Newcastle United, Motherwell, Third Lanark, Worcester City and Arbroath. McCall appeared for Aberdeen in the Scottish Cup Final and the Scottish League Cup Final during the 1946–47 season.
