= George Scott =

George Scott may refer to:

== Arts and entertainment ==
- George Scott (singer) (1929-2005), vocalist for gospel music group The Blind Boys of Alabama
- George Scott III (1953–1980), American No Wave bassist
- George C. Scott (1927–1999), American actor

== Politics and government ==
- George Scott (British Army officer) (died 1767), fought in Canada, governor of Grenada, 1762–1764
- George Scott (broadcaster) (1925–1988), British author, broadcaster and Liberal Party candidate
- George Scott, American politician in Pennsylvania; see 2018 United States House of Representatives elections in Pennsylvania
- George Adam Scott (1874–1963), Canadian provincial politician
- George Byng Scott (1824–1886), Administrator of the Northern Territory of Australia from 1863 to 1876
- George Cromwell Scott (1864–1948), U.S. Representative from Iowa
- George E. Scott (1860–1915), Wisconsin State Senator
- George G. Scott (1811–1886), New York lawyer and politician
- George M. Scott (Minnesota judge) (1922–2006), Minnesota Supreme Court justice
- George M. Scott (West Virginia judge) (1929–2015), Justice of the Supreme Court of Appeals of West Virginia
- George Montgomery Scott (1835–1915), mayor of Salt Lake City, Utah
- George W. Scott (politician) (born 1937), American politician in the state of Washington
- James George Scott (1851–1935), known as George Scott, journalist and colonial Burmese administrator

== Sports ==
- George Scott (boxer) (born 1966), Swedish boxer
- George Scott (cricketer) (born 1995), English cricketer
- George Scott (first baseman) (1944–2013), American baseball player
- George Scott (Roubaix footballer), Scottish footballer
- George Scott (footballer, born 1865) (1865–1937), Scottish footballer
- George Scott (footballer, born 1885) (1885–1916), English football player
- George Scott (footballer, born 1904) (1904–?), English football player
- George Scott (footballer, born 1915) (1915–1942), Scottish footballer
- George Scott (footballer, born 1944), Scottish football player for Tranmere Rovers
- George Scott (pitcher) (1895–1962), American baseball player
- George Scott (snooker player) (1928–1998), English snooker player
- George Scott (wrestler) (1929–2014), Scottish-born Canadian wrestler
- George Arbuthnot Scott (1879–1927), cricketer
- George W. Scott (American football) (1889–1969), American football and track and field coach
- George Scott (runner) (born 1936), Australian runner, 1967 NCAA indoor 3000 m runner-up for the New Mexico Lobos track and field team

== Writers ==
- George Scot of Pitlochie (died 1685), wrote a 1683 book extolling the virtues of Scottish settlement in East Jersey
- George Firth Scott (1862–1935), journalist and writer
- George Ryley Scott (1886–c. 1980), British author of books about sexual intercourse

== Others ==
- Lord George Scott (1866–1947), Scottish cricketer and soldier
- George Scott (missionary) (1804–1874), Scottish Methodist missionary to Sweden
- George Douglas Scott, English chief executive officer
- George Gilbert Scott (1811–1878), Victorian architect
- George Gilbert Scott Jr. (1839–1897), his son, also an architect
- George Herbert Scott (1888–1930), British airship pilot and engineer
- George Ian Scott (1907–1989), Scottish ophthalmic surgeon and president of the Royal College of Surgeons of Edinburgh
- George Lewis Scott (1708–1780), English royal tutor, encyclopedist, and dilettante
- George Washington Scott (1829–1903), industrialist and philanthropist, benefactor of Agnes Scott College
- Lynching of George Scott, on December 12, 1880
