= 1932–33 Aberdeen F.C. season =

Aberdeen F.C.
1932–33 season
- Chairman: John Robertson
- Manager: Pat Travers
- Scottish League Division One: 6th
- Scottish Cup: 2nd Round
- Top goalscorer: League: Paddy Moore (27); All: Paddy Moore (28)
- Highest home attendance: 23,000 vs. Celtic, 24 December
- Lowest home attendance: 4,000 vs. Cowdenbeath 25 February

The 1932–33 season was Aberdeen's 28th season in the top flight of Scottish football and their 29th season overall. Aberdeen competed in the Scottish League Division One and the Scottish Cup.

== Results ==
=== Division One ===
Match Day	Date	Opponent	H/A	Score	Aberdeen Scorer(s)	Attendance
1	13 August	Celtic	A	0–3		15,000
2	20 August	Motherwell	H	1–1	Moore	20,000
3	24 August	Kilmarnock	H	7–1	Love (2), Moore (2), Beattie, McLean, Mills	12,000
4	27 August	Ayr United	A	1–3	Love	6,000
5	3 September	Airdrieonians	H	2–0	Moore, Mills	10,000
6	10 September	Dundee	A	2–0	Moore (2)	8,000
7	14 September	Falkirk	H	8–2	Moore (6), Falloon, Love	10,500
8	17 September	East Stirlingshire	H	1–3	Moore	10,000
9	24 September	Partick Thistle	A	2–1	Mills, Moore	6,000
10	26 September	Heart of Midlothian	H	3–0	Love, Mills, Moore	12,000
11	1 October	Third Lanark	H	1–0	Moore	11,000
12	8 October	Cowdenbeath	A	3–0	McLean, Moore, Beattie	2,000
13	15 October	St Mirren	H	5–1	Mills (2), Beattie, McLean, Moore	12,000
14	22 October	Morton	A	1–0	Moore	4,000
15	29 October	Hamilton Academical	H	2–1	Beattie, Mills	8,000
16	5 November	Kilmarnock	A	3–4	Mills (2), Love	8,000
17	12 November	Falkirk	A	0–2		9,000
18	19 November	Clyde	H	8–1	Mills (3), Moore (2), Warnock, Beattie, ?	12,000
19	26 November	St Johnstone	H	0–0		12,500
20	3 December	Rangers	A	1–3	Mills	20,000
21	10 December	Heart of Midlothian	A	1–3	Mills	16,000
22	17 December	Queen's Park	H	3–4	Love (2 including 1 penalty), Adam	12,000
23	24 December	Celtic	H	1–0	Beattie	23,000
24	31 December	Motherwell	A	3–2	Moore (2), McDermid	6,000
25	2 January	Dundee	H	3–2	Moore, Fraser, Beattie	16,000
26	3 January	East Stirlingshire	A	1–2	Mills	3,000
27	7 January	Ayr United	H	5–0	Love (2 including 1 penalty), Mills, McLean, Beattie	9,000
28	14 January	Airdrieonians	A	0–2		3,000
29	28 January	Partick Thistle	H	0–0		12,000
30	11 February	Third Lanark	A	0–3		5,000
31	25 February	Cowdenbeath	H	6–2	Mills (2), Warnock, Armstrong (3), McGill, Benyon	4,000
32	4 March	St Mirren	A	2–2	Armstrong (2)	4,000
33	11 March	Morton	H	6–0	Moore (3), Love (penalty), Beattie, Benyon	12,000
34	18 March	Hamilton Academical	A	0–1		5,000
35	25 March	Clyde	A	0–2		3,000
36	8 April	St Johnstone	A	2–2	Love (2)	5,000
37	15 April	Rangers	H	1–1	Johnston	18,000
38	29 April	Queen's Park	A	0–4		4,000

==== Final standings ====
Pos	Team	Pld	W	D	L	GF	GA	GD	Pts
4	Celtic	38	20	8	10	75	44	+31	48
5	St Johnstone	38	17	10	11	70	55	+15	44
6	Aberdeen	38	18	6	14	85	58	+27	42
7	St Mirren	38	18	6	14	73	60	+13	42
8	Hamilton Academical	38	18	6	14	90	78	+12	42

Source: RSSSF

=== Scottish Cup ===
Round	Date	Opponent	H/A	Score	Aberdeen Scorer(s)	Attendance
R1	21 January	Penicuik	H	1–0	Moore	6,401
R2	4 February	Hibernian	H	1–1	Beattie	16,262
R2 R	3 March	Hibernian	A	0–1		23,000

== Squad ==
=== Appearances & Goals ===
No.	Pos	Nat	Player	Total		Division One		Scottish Cup	
No.	Pos	Nat	Player	Apps	Goals	Apps	Goals	Apps	Goals
	GK	(Scotland) SCO	Steve Smith	41	0	38	0	3	0
	GK	(Scotland) SCO	Dave Cumming	0	0	0	0	0	0
	DF	(Scotland) SCO	Charlie McGill	41	1	38	1	3	0
	DF	(Scotland) SCO	Willie Cooper	37	0	34	0	3	0
	DF	(Scotland) SCO	Bob Fraser	26	1	25	1	1	0
	DF	(Ireland) IRE	James Daly	4	0	4	0	0	0
	DF	(Scotland) SCO	Claud Sharp	0	0	0	0	0	0
	DF	(Scotland) SCO	Willie Jackson	0	0	0	0	0	0
	MF	(Northern Ireland) NIR	Eddie Falloon	36	1	33	1	3	0
	MF	(Ireland) IRE	Joe O'Reilly	26	0	23	0	3	0
	MF	(Scotland) SCO	Willie Godfrey	18	0	15	0	3	0
	MF	(Scotland) SCO	Dave Warnock	13	2	12	2	1	0
	MF	(Northern Ireland) NIR	Hugh Mooney	9	0	9	0	0	0
	MF	(Scotland) SCO	Bert Johnston	6	1	5	1	1	0
	MF	(Scotland) SCO	Hugh Adam	6	1	5	1	1	0
	MF	(Wales) WAL	Jackie Beynon	5	2	5	2	0	0
	MF	??	George Thomson	3	0	3	0	0	0
	MF	(Scotland) SCO	Alex Robertson	2	0	2	0	0	0
	FW	(Scotland) SCO	Jack Beattie	41	10	38	9	3	1
	FW	(Scotland) SCO	Willie Mills	34	18	31	18	3	0
	FW	(Ireland) IRE	Paddy Moore	30	28	29	27	1	1
	FW	(Scotland) SCO	Adam McLean	28	5	25	5	3	0
	FW	(Scotland) SCO	Andy Love	26	13	25	13	1	0
	FW	(Scotland) SCO	Matt Armstrong	7	3	7	3	0	0
	FW	(Scotland) SCO	Bob McDermid (c)	7	1	7	1	0	0
	FW	(Scotland) SCO	Percy Dickie	4	0	4	0	0	0
	FW	(Scotland) SCO	Dick Donald	1	0	1	0	0	0
