= 1933–34 Aberdeen F.C. season =

Aberdeen F.C.
1933–34 season
- Chairman: John Robertson
- Manager: Paddy Travers
- Scottish League Division One: 5th
- Scottish Cup: Quarter-finalists
- Top goalscorer: League: Willie Mills (26); All: Willie Mills (26)
- Highest home attendance: 26,943 vs. Dundee, 3 February
- Lowest home attendance: 4,000 vs. St Mirren 4 April

The 1933–34 season was Aberdeen's 29th season in the top flight of Scottish football and their 30th season overall. Aberdeen competed in the Scottish League Division One and the Scottish Cup.

== Results ==
=== Division One ===
Match Day	Date	Opponent	H/A	Score	Aberdeen Scorer(s)	Attendance
1	12 August	Ayr United	H	8–0	Armstrong (5), Benyon, Mills	15,000
2	19 August	Airdrieonians	A	1–0	Armstrong	4,500
3	23 August	Kilmarnock	A	0–2		7,000
4	26 August	Partick Thistle	H	3–0	Gall, Mills, Armstrong	14,000
5	2 September	Third Lanark	A	3–2	Beattie, Benyon, Armstrong	4,000
6	9 September	Dundee	H	1–3	Mills	17,000
7	13 September	Falkirk	A	5–6	Benyon (2), Moore (2), Gall	7,000
8	16 September	Motherwell	A	1–4	Warnock	5,000
9	23 September	Hibernian	H	2–1	Mills (2)	10,000
10	25 September	Motherwell	H	1–1	Moore	14,000
11	30 September	Cowdenbeath	A	4–2	Gall, Moore, Benyon, Mills	2,000
12	7 October	Celtic	H	3–0	Mills (2), Moore	17,000
13	14 October	St Mirren	A	3–2	Moore (2), Mills	5,000
14	21 October	Queen of the South	H	5–0	Mills (2), Benyon, Moore, Warnock	11,000
15	28 October	Hamilton Academical	A	1–2	Mills	4,000
16	4 November	Kilmarnock	H	2–0	Moore (2)	13,000
17	11 November	Falkirk	H	5–0	Benyon (2), Warnock, Mills, Moore	12,000
18	18 November	Clyde	A	2–2	Mills	4,000
19	25 November	St Johnstone	H	1–1	Mills	11,000
20	2 December	Rangers	H	1–2	Thomson	17,000
21	9 December	Heart of Midlothian	A	0–0		15,000
22	23 December	Ayr United	A	2–1	Moore, Love	9,500
23	30 December	Airdrieonians	H	4–0	Mills (3), Warnock	9,000
24	1 December	Dundee	A	1–1	Moore	7,000
25	2 January	Cowdenbeath	H	5–0	Mills (3), Cooper, Moore	14,000
26	6 January	Partick Thistle	A	0–4		6,000
27	13 January	Third Lanark	H	3–0	Moore, Warnock, Armstrong	10,000
28	27 January	Hibernian	A	2–3	Thomson, Westland	12,000
29	10 February	Hamilton Academical	H	5–1	Mills (2), Moore, Love, Warnock	10,000
30	24 February	Celtic	A	2–2	Moore, Robertson	5,500
31	10 March	Queen of the South	A	1–4	Westland	5,000
32	24 March	Clyde	H	4–0	Benyon (2), Mills, Cooper	8,000
33	28 March	Queen's Park	A	5–1	Mills (2), Armstrong, Love, Benyon	1,500
34	7 April	Rangers	A	1–2	Armstrong	18,000
35	11 April	St Johnstone	A	1–5	Armstrong	6,000
36	14 April	St Mirren	H	0–0		4,000
37	21 April	Heart of Midlothian	H	0–1		11,500
38	28 April	Queen's Park	H	2–2	Armstrong (2)	6,000

==== Final standings ====
Pos	Team	Pld	W	D	L	GF	GA	GD	Pts
3	Celtic	38	18	11	9	78	53	+25	47
4	Queen of the South	38	21	3	14	75	48	+27	45
5	Aberdeen	38	18	8	12	90	57	+33	44
6	Heart of Midlothian	38	17	10	11	86	59	+27	44
7	Kilmarnock	38	17	9	12	73	64	+9	43

Source: RSSSF

=== Scottish Cup ===
Round	Date	Opponent	H/A	Score	Aberdeen Scorer(s)	Attendance
R1	20 January	Raith Rovers	H	1–0	Moore	12,959
R2	3 February	Dundee	H	2–0	Thomson, Beynon	26,943
R3	17 February	Hibernian	A	1–0	Love	25,600
QF	3 March	Rangers	A	0–1		53,000

== Squad ==
=== Appearances & Goals ===
No.	Pos	Nat	Player	Total		Division One		Scottish Cup	
No.	Pos	Nat	Player	Apps	Goals	Apps	Goals	Apps	Goals
	GK	(Scotland) SCO	Steve Smith	37	0	33	0	4	0
	GK	(Scotland) SCO	Dave Cumming	5	0	5	0	0	0
	DF	(Scotland) SCO	Willie Cooper	42	2	38	2	4	0
	DF	(Scotland) SCO	Charlie McGill	42	0	38	0	4	0
	DF	(Scotland) SCO	Bob Fraser (c)	33	0	29	0	4	0
	DF	(Scotland) SCO	Charlie Gavin	3	0	3	0	0	0
	DF	??	?? Palmer	0	0	0	0	0	0
	DF	(Scotland) SCO	Claud Sharp	0	0	0	0	0	0
	MF	(Wales) WAL	Jackie Beynon	39	12	35	11	4	1
	MF	??	George Thomson	37	3	33	2	4	1
	MF	(Northern Ireland) NIR	Eddie Falloon	35	0	31	0	4	0
	MF	(Scotland) SCO	Dave Warnock	34	6	30	6	4	0
	MF	(Scotland) SCO	Willie Gall	22	3	22	3	0	0
	MF	(Ireland) IRE	Joe O'Reilly	15	0	15	0	0	0
	MF	(Scotland) SCO	Bert Johnston	4	0	3	0	1	0
	MF	(Scotland) SCO	Alex Robertson	3	1	3	1	0	0
	FW	(Scotland) SCO	Willie Mills	39	28	35	28	4	0
	FW	(Ireland) IRE	Paddy Moore	32	18	29	17	3	1
	FW	(Scotland) SCO	Andy Love	19	4	16	3	3	1
	FW	(Scotland) SCO	Matt Armstrong	13	14	12	14	1	0
	FW	(Scotland) SCO	Jack Beattie	5	1	5	1	0	0
	FW	(Scotland) SCO	Jim Westland	2	2	2	2	0	0
	FW	(Scotland) SCO	Dick Donald	1	0	1	0	0	0
