= 1946–47 Aberdeen F.C. season =

Aberdeen F.C.
1946–47 season
- Chairman: William Mitchell
- Manager: Dave Halliday
- Scottish League Division One: 3rd
- Scottish Cup: Winners
- Scottish League Cup: Runners-up
- Top goalscorer: League: George Hamilton (16); All: George Hamilton (31)
- Highest home attendance: 35,000 vs. Rangers, 4 September
- Lowest home attendance: 10,000 vs. Clyde 1 February
Home colours

The 1946–47 season was Aberdeen's 35th season in the top flight of Scottish football and their 36th season competed in the Scottish League Division One, Scottish League Cup, and the Scottish Cup.

== Results ==
=== Division A ===
| Match Day | Date | Opponent | H/A | Score | Aberdeen Scorer(s) | Attendance |
|---|---|---|---|---|---|---|
| 1 | 10 August | Third Lanark | A | 3–0 | Hamilton, Taylor, Harris | 12,000 |
| 2 | 14 August | Kilmarnock | H | 1–0 | Baird | 18,000 |
| 3 | 17 August | Celtic | H | 6–2 | Baird (2), Harris, Hamilton, Williams, Kiddie | 30,000 |
| 4 | 21 August | Motherwell | A | 2–2 | Kiddie, Williams | 9,000 |
| 5 | 24 August | St Mirren | A | 2–4 | Baird (2) | 13,000 |
| 6 | 28 August | Hibernian | H | 2–1 | Howie, Harris | 29,000 |
| 7 | 31 August | Clyde | A | 2–0 | Harris (2) | 17,000 |
| 8 | 4 September | Rangers | H | 1–0 | Taylor | 35,000 |
| 9 | 7 September | Falkirk | H | 0–2 | | 10,000 |
| 10 | 14 September | Partick Thistle | H | 2–2 | McCall, Harris | 25,000 |
| 11 | 2 November | Queen of the South | H | 0–0 | | 18,000 |
| 12 | 9 November | Morton | A | 0–0 | | 8,000 |
| 13 | 16 November | Queen's Park | H | 3–1 | Millar (2), McCall | 15,000 |
| 14 | 23 November | Heart of Midlothian | H | 2–1 | Waldron, Hamilton | 14,000 |
| 15 | 30 November | Hamilton Academical | A | 5–2 | Hamilton (3), Harris, Williams | 6,000 |
| 16 | 7 December | Third Lanark | H | 1–0 | Hamilton | 12,000 |
| 17 | 14 December | Kilmarnock | A | 1–2 | | 8,500 |
| 18 | 21 December | Motherwell | H | 3–1 | Waldron (2), Hume | 15,000 |
| 19 | 28 December | Hibernian | A | 1–1 | Harris | 30,000 |
| 20 | 1 January | Falkirk | H | 0–4 | | 20,000 |
| 21 | 2 January | Celtic | A | 5–1 | Hamilton (4), Harris | 25,000 |
| 22 | 4 January | Partick Thistle | A | 0–4 | | 12,000 |
| 23 | 18 January | Rangers | A | 0–1 | | 57,000 |
| 24 | 1 February | Clyde | H | 2–1 | Hamilton, Williams | 10,000 |
| 25 | 26 April | Queen's Park | A | 0–0 | | 8,000 |
| 26 | 28 April | Queen of the South | A | 5–1 | McCall (2), Harris, Hamilton, Williams | 6,500 |
| 27 | 3 May | St Mirren | H | 4–2 | Kiddie (3), McCall | 13,500 |
| 28 | 5 May | Morton | H | 2–2 | Hamilton, Taylor (penalty) | 12,000 |
| 29 | 14 May | Hamilton Academical | H | 3–0 | Hamilton (2), Baird | 12,000 |
| 30 | 17 May | Heart of Midlothian | A | 0–4 | Kelly | 15,844 |

==== Final standings ====
| Pos | Team | Pld | W | D | L | GF | GA | GD | Pts |
|---|---|---|---|---|---|---|---|---|---|
| 1 | Rangers | 30 | 21 | 4 | 5 | 76 | 26 | +50 | 46 |
| 2 | Hibernian | 30 | 19 | 6 | 5 | 69 | 33 | +36 | 44 |
| 3 | Aberdeen | 30 | 16 | 7 | 7 | 58 | 41 | +17 | 39 |
| 4 | Hearts | 30 | 16 | 6 | 8 | 52 | 43 | +9 | 38 |
| 5 | Partick Thistle | 30 | 16 | 3 | 11 | 74 | 59 | +15 | 35 |

Source: RSSSF

=== Scottish League Cup ===
==== Group Section D ====
| Round | Date | Opponent | H/A | Score | Aberdeen Scorer(s) | Attendance |
|---|---|---|---|---|---|---|
| 1 | 21 September | Falkirk | H | 4–3 | Hamilton (4) | 25,000 |
| 2 | 28 September | Queen of the South | A | 5–2 | Millar (2), Kiddie, Hamilton, Harris | 17,000 |
| 3 | 5 October | Motherwell | H | 2–1 | McCall (2) | 25,000 |
| 4 | 12 October | Falkirk | A | 1–0 | Hamilton | 17,000 |
| 5 | 19 October | Queen of the South | H | 1–0 | McCall | 22,000 |
| 6 | 26 October | Motherwell | A | 0–3 | | 8,500 |

==== Section D final table ====
| Team | Pld | W | D | L | GF | GA | GR | Pts |
|---|---|---|---|---|---|---|---|---|
| Aberdeen (1) | 6 | 4 | 0 | 2 | 13 | 11 | 1.182 | 8 |
| Motherwell (1) | 6 | 3 | 1 | 2 | 15 | 11 | 1.364 | 7 |
| Falkirk (1) | 6 | 2 | 1 | 3 | 11 | 12 | 0.917 | 5 |
| Queen of the South (1) | 6 | 2 | 0 | 4 | 8 | 13 | 0.615 | 4 |

==== Knockout stage ====
| Round | Date | Opponent | H/A | Score | Aberdeen Scorer(s) | Attendance |
|---|---|---|---|---|---|---|
| QF L1 | 1 March | Dundee | A | 1–0 | Millar | 28,300 |
| QF L2 | 5 March | Dundee | H | 3–2 | Hamilton (2), McCall | 18,500 |
| SF | 22 March | Heart of Midlothian | N | 6–2 | Hamilton (3), Baird, McCall, | 36,000 |
| F | 5 April | Rangers | N | 0–4 | | 82,684 |

=== Scottish Cup ===
| Round | Date | Opponent | H/A | Score | Aberdeen Scorer(s) | Attendance |
|---|---|---|---|---|---|---|
| R1 | 25 January | Partick Thistle | H | 2–1 | McCall, Cooper | 34,000 |
| R2 | 8 February | Ayr United | H | 8–0 | Hamilton (3), Harris (3), Williams, Botha | 15,500 |
| R3 | 22 February | Morton | H | 1–1 | Millar | 30,000 |
| R3R | 8 March | Morton | A | 2–1 | McCall, Hamilton | 18,500 |
| R4 | 29 March | Dundee | A | 2–1 | Williams (2) | 35,500 |
| SF | 12 April | Arbroath | N | 2–0 | Williams (2) | 22,000 |
| F | 19 April | Hibernian | N | 2–1 | Hamilton, Williams | 82,140 |

== Squad ==
=== Appearances & Goals ===
| No. | Pos | Nat | Player | Total | | Division One | | Scottish Cup | | League Cup | |
| No. | Pos | Nat | Player | Apps | Goals | Apps | Goals | Apps | Goals | Apps | Goals |
|---|---|---|---|---|---|---|---|---|---|---|---|
| | GK | (Scotland) SCO | George Johnstone | 43 | 0 | 26 | 0 | 7 | 0 | 10 | 0 |
| | GK | (Scotland) SCO | Frank Watson | 4 | 0 | 4 | 0 | 0 | 0 | 0 | 0 |
| | DF | (Scotland) SCO | Frank Dunlop | 43 | 0 | 27 | 0 | 7 | 0 | 9 | 0 |
| | DF | (Scotland) SCO | Pat McKenna | 41 | 0 | 24 | 0 | 7 | 0 | 10 | 0 |
| | DF | (Scotland) SCO | Willie Cooper (c) | 29 | 1 | 14 | 0 | 6 | 1 | 9 | 0 |
| | DF | (Scotland) SCO | Andy Cowie | 25 | 0 | 17 | 0 | 0 | 0 | 8 | 0 |
| | DF | (Scotland) SCO | Willie Waddell | 20 | 0 | 12 | 0 | 2 | 0 | 6 | 0 |
| | DF | (South Africa) SOU | Jimmy Preston | 3 | 0 | 3 | 0 | 0 | 0 | 0 | 0 |
| | DF | (Scotland) SCO | Ralph McKenzie | 2 | 0 | 2 | 0 | 0 | 0 | 0 | 0 |
| | DF | (England) ENG | Ben Robson | 1 | 0 | 1 | 0 | 0 | 0 | 0 | 0 |
| | DF | ?? | Frank McDonald | 1 | 0 | 1 | 0 | 0 | 0 | 0 | 0 |
| | MF | (Scotland) SCO | Willie McCall | 46 | 12 | 29 | 5 | 7 | 2 | 10 | 5 |
| | MF | (Scotland) SCO | Tony Harris | 45 | 14 | 28 | 10 | 7 | 3 | 10 | 1 |
| | MF | (Scotland) SCO | George Taylor | 37 | 3 | 28 | 3 | 6 | 0 | 3 | 0 |
| | MF | (Scotland) SCO | Joe McLaughlin | 31 | 0 | 19 | 0 | 7 | 0 | 5 | 0 |
| | MF | (Scotland) SCO | Alex Kiddie | 17 | 6 | 13 | 5 | 0 | 0 | 4 | 1 |
| | MF | (Scotland) SCO | Willie Millar | 13 | 6 | 5 | 2 | 2 | 1 | 6 | 3 |
| | MF | (Scotland) SCO | Willie Hume | 4 | 0 | 4 | 0 | 0 | 0 | 0 | 0 |
| | MF | (South Africa) SOU | Ray Botha | 3 | 1 | 1 | 0 | 2 | 1 | 0 | 0 |
| | MF | (Scotland) SCO | Ian Jamieson | 1 | 0 | 1 | 0 | 0 | 0 | 0 | 0 |
| | MF | (Scotland) SCO | George Merchant | 0 | 0 | 0 | 0 | 0 | 0 | 0 | 0 |
| | FW | (Scotland) SCO | George Hamilton | 42 | 33 | 26 | 17 | 7 | 5 | 9 | 11 |
| | FW | (South Africa) SOU | Stan Williams | 39 | 11 | 23 | 5 | 7 | 6 | 9 | 0 |
| | FW | (Scotland) SCO | Archie Baird | 19 | 7 | 14 | 6 | 3 | 0 | 2 | 1 |
| | FW | (England) ENG | Ernie Waldron | 7 | 3 | 7 | 3 | 0 | 0 | 0 | 0 |
| | FW | ?? | Mike Coleman | 1 | 0 | 1 | 0 | 0 | 0 | 0 | 0 |
| | FW | (England) ENG | Horace Wallbanks | 0 | 0 | 0 | 0 | 0 | 0 | 0 | 0 |
