= 1936–37 Scottish Cup =

Tournament details
- Country: Scotland

Final positions
- Champions: Celtic
- Runners-up: Aberdeen

The 1936–37 Scottish Cup was the 59th staging of Scotland's most prestigious football knockout competition. The Cup was won by Celtic who defeated Aberdeen in the final before a European record domestic crowd of 147,365.

== Fourth round ==
Team One	Team Two	Score
Celtic	Motherwell	4-4 2-1
St Mirren	Clyde	0-3
Hamilton Academical	Aberdeen	1-2
Morton	Queen of the South	4-1

== Semi-finals ==
3 April 1937

Aberdeen	2–0	Morton

Attendance: 31,970

3 April 1937

Celtic	2–0	Clyde

Attendance: 76,000

== Final ==
24 April 1937

Celtic	2–1	Aberdeen
Johnny Crum; Willie Buchan		Matt Armstrong

Hampden Park, Glasgow
Attendance: 147,365

=== Teams ===
Celtic:
GK	(Canada) Joe Kennaway
RB	(Scotland) Bobby Hogg
LB	(Scotland) John Morrison
RH	(Scotland) Chic Geatons
CH	(Scotland) Willie Lyon (Captain)
LH	(Scotland) George Paterson
RW	(Scotland) Jimmy Delaney
IR	(Scotland) Willie Buchan
CF	(Scotland) Jimmy McGrory
IL	(Scotland) Johnny Crum
LW	(Scotland) Frank Murphy
Manager:
(Scotland) Willie Maley

Aberdeen:
GK	(Scotland) George Johnstone
RB	(Scotland) Willie Cooper
LB	(Scotland) Bob Temple
RH	(Scotland) Frank Dunlop
CH	(Northern Ireland) Eddie Falloon (Captain)
LH	(Scotland) George Thomson
RW	(Wales) Jackie Beynon
IR	(Scotland) Johnny McKenzie
CF	(Scotland) Matt Armstrong
IL	(Scotland) Willie Mills
LW	(Scotland) Johnny Lang
Manager:
(Scotland) Paddy Travers
