= 1947–48 Aberdeen F.C. season =

Aberdeen F.C.
1947–48 season
- Chairman: William Mitchell
- Manager: Dave Halliday
- Scottish League Division One: 10th
- Scottish Cup: 3rd Round
- Scottish League Cup: Semi-finalists
- Top goalscorer: League: Archie Kelly (10); All: Stan Williams (13)
- Highest home attendance: 43,000 vs. Rangers, 3 April
- Lowest home attendance: 10,000 vs. Heart of Midlothian, 15 November vs. St Mirren, 27 December
Home colours

The 1947–48 season was Aberdeen's 36th season in the top flight of Scottish football and their 37th season competed in the Scottish League Division One, Scottish League Cup, and the Scottish Cup.

== Results ==
=== Division A ===
Match Day	Date	Opponent	H/A	Score	Aberdeen Scorer(s)	Attendance
1	13 August	Hibernian	H	0–2		40,000
2	26 August	St Mirren	A	0–3		13,500
3	20 September	Dundee	H	3–2	Williams, Baird, Hamilton	20,000
4	4 October	Celtic	H	2–0	Kiddie, Baird	25,000
5	18 October	Falkirk	H	1–2	Millar	17,000
6	25 October	Partick Thistle	A	1–2	Kiddie	25,000
7	1 November	Queen of the South	H	2–2	Taylor, Harris	16,000
8	8 November	Airdireonians	A	1–2	McCall	5,500
9	15 November	Heart of Midlothian	H	1–1	Kiddie	10,000
10	22 November	Queen's Park	H	6–0	Williams (2), Harris (2), Millar, Taylor	15,000
11	29 November	Morton	A	1–0	Hamilton	9,500
12	6 December	Clyde	H	3–1	Hamilton, Harris, Williams	10,500
13	13 December	Rangers	A	0–4		25,000
14	20 December	Hibernian	A	0–4		20,000
15	25 December	Third Lanark	A	2–3	Yorston, Taylor (penalty)	8,000
16	27 December	St Mirren	H	5–0	Yorston (2), Kelly, McCall, Kiddie	10,000
17	1 January	Dundee	A	0–0		14,500
18	3 January	Motherwell	H	2–1	Yorston, Kelly	25,000
19	10 January	Celtic	A	0–1		18,000
20	17 January	Third Lanark	H	2–2	Yorston	14,000
21	31 January	Falkirk	A	1–3	Kelly	8,000
22	14 February	Partick Thistle	H	0–1		25,000
23	28 February	Airdrieonians	H	3–0	Pearson, Baird, Harris	18,000
24	6 March	Heart of Midlothian	A	1–1	Kelly	17,937
25	13 March	Queen's Park	A	1–3	Williams	15,000
26	20 March	Morton	H	2–1	Kelly, Williams	18,000
27	26 March	Clyde	A	3–1	Kelly (3)	8,000
28	3 April	Rangers	H	1–1	Kelly	43,000
29	9 April	Queen of the South	A	0–0		12,000
30	17 April	Motherwell	A	1–2	Kelly	8,500

==== Final standings ====
Pos	Team	Pld	W	D	L	GF	GA	GD	Pts
8	Motherwell	30	13	3	14	45	47	−2	29
9	Heart of Midlothian	30	10	8	12	37	42	−5	28
10	Aberdeen	30	10	7	13	45	45	0	27
11	Third Lanark	30	10	6	14	56	73	−17	26
12	Celtic	30	10	5	15	41	56	−15	25

Source: SPFL

=== Scottish League Cup ===
==== Group 1 ====
Round	Date	Opponent	H/A	Score	Aberdeen Scorer(s)	Attendance
1	9 August	St Mirren	A	1–0	Williams	8,000
2	16 August	Motherwell	H	2–0	Millar, Kiddie	20,000
3	23 August	Queen of the South	A	2–1	Baird (2)	14,000
4	30 August	St Mirren	H	2–0	Hamilton (2)	20,000
5	6 September	Motherwell	A	0–2		21,500
6	13 September	Queen of the South	H	9–0	Hamilton (4), Williams (3), Baird, Millar	25,000

==== Group 1 final table ====
Team	Pld	W	D	L	GF	GA	GR	Pts
Aberdeen	6	5	0	1	16	3	5.333	10
Motherwell	6	5	0	1	13	3	4.333	10
St Mirren	6	1	0	5	9	18	0.500	2
Queen of the South	6	1	0	5	10	24	0.417	2

==== Knockout stage ====
Round	Date	Opponent	H/A	Score	Aberdeen Scorer(s)	Attendance
QF	27 September	Leith Athletic	H	8–2	Williams (3), Millar (3), Baird, Hamilton	17,000
SF	11 October	East Fife	N	0–1		30,000

=== Scottish Cup ===
Round	Date	Opponent	H/A	Score	Aberdeen Scorer(s)	Attendance
R2	7 February	Nithsdale Wanderers	A	5–0	Stenhouse (2), Kelly (2), Harris	2,600
R3	21 February	Hibernian	A	2–4	Pearson, Harris	37,000

== Squad ==
=== Appearances & Goals ===
No.	Pos	Nat	Player	Total		Division One		Scottish Cup		League Cup	
No.	Pos	Nat	Player	Apps	Goals	Apps	Goals	Apps	Goals	Apps	Goals
	GK	(Scotland) SCO	George Johnstone	38	0	28	0	2	0	8	0
	GK	(Scotland) SCO	Willie Bruce	1	0	1	0	0	0	0	0
	GK	(Scotland) SCO	Charlie Scott	1	0	1	0	0	0	0	0
	DF	(Scotland) SCO	Pat McKenna	40	0	30	0	2	0	8	0
	DF	(Scotland) SCO	Andy Cowie	37	0	27	0	2	0	8	0
	DF	(Scotland) SCO	Willie Waddell	30	0	23	0	2	0	5	0
	DF	(Scotland) SCO	Frank Dunlop (c)	20	0	14	0	1	0	5	0
	DF	(Scotland) SCO	Willie Roy	8	0	8	0	0	0	0	0
	DF	(Scotland) SCO	Willie Cooper (c)	7	0	7	0	0	0	0	0
	DF	(Scotland) SCO	Hugh McVean	4	0	4	0	0	0	0	0
	DF	(South Africa) SOU	Jimmy Preston	0	0	0	0	0	0	0	0
	DF	(Scotland) SCO	Ralph McKenzie	0	0	0	0	0	0	0	0
	DF	(Scotland) SCO	Allan Massie	0	0	0	0	0	0	0	0
	MF	(Scotland) SCO	George Taylor	39	3	29	3	2	0	8	0
	MF	(Scotland) SCO	Tony Harris	37	6	28	4	2	2	7	0
	MF	(Scotland) SCO	Willie Millar	21	7	15	2	0	0	6	5
	MF	(Scotland) SCO	Alex Kiddie	20	5	17	4	0	0	3	1
	MF	(Scotland) SCO	Willie McCall	19	3	13	3	0	0	6	0
	MF	(Scotland) SCO	Joe McLaughlin	16	0	9	0	1	0	6	0
	MF	(Scotland) SCO	Tommy Pearson	10	2	9	1	1	1	0	0
	MF	(Scotland) SCO	Jimmy Stenhouse	5	2	3	0	2	2	0	0
	MF	(Scotland) SCO	Willie Hume	3	0	2	0	0	0	1	0
	MF	(South Africa) SOU	Ray Botha	0	0	0	0	0	0	0	0
	MF	(Scotland) SCO	Archie Glen	0	0	0	0	0	0	0	0
	FW	(South Africa) SOU	Stan Williams	23	13	17	6	2	0	4	7
	FW	(Scotland) SCO	Archie Baird	22	7	13	3	2	0	7	4
	FW	(Scotland) SCO	Archie Kelly	17	12	16	10	1	2	0	0
	FW	(Scotland) SCO	George Hamilton	14	9	8	2	0	0	6	7
	FW	(Scotland) SCO	Harry Yorston	6	6	6	6	0	0	0	0
	FW	(England) ENG	Ernie Waldron	1	0	1	0	0	0	0	0
	FW	??	Jimmy Owens	1	0	1	0	0	0	0	0
	FW	(Scotland) SCO	Jimmy McIntyre	0	0	0	0	0	0	0	0
	FW	(Scotland) SCO	Freddie Smith	0	0	0	0	0	0	0	0
