= James Daly =

James Daly may refer to:

- James Daly (actor) (1918–1978), American theater, film and television actor
- James Daly (died 1769) (c.1716–1769), Irish MP for Athenry 1747–1768 and Galway Borough 1768–1769
- James Daly (activist) (1838–1911), organiser of the first Irish Land League meeting in 1879 and owner-editor of the Connaught Telegraph 1876–1888
- James Daly (journalist), San Francisco Bay Area journalist
- James Daly (mutineer) (1899–1920), leader of the mutiny of the Connaught Rangers in 1920
- James Daly (American politician) (1844–1892), New York politician
- James Daly (Irish nationalist politician) (1852–1910), Irish MP for the constituency of South Monaghan 1895–1902
- James Daly (English politician) (born 1980), English Conservative Party politician
- James Daly, 1st Baron Dunsandle and Clanconal (1782–1847), Member of Parliament (MP) for County Galway, Ireland
- James Joseph Daly (1921–2013), American prelate of the Roman Catholic Church
- James Daly (jockey), rode in the 1846 Grand National
- James Daly (footballer) (born 2000), English footballer playing for Bristol Rovers
- James Louis Daly (1897–1963), New Caledonian businessman and politician
- James Daly (co-operator) (1811–1849), founding member of the Rochdale Society of Equitable Pioneers

== See also ==
- James Daley (disambiguation)
- Jim Daly (disambiguation)
- Jimmy Daly (1904–?), Irish footballer
- Jimmy Dailey (1927–2002), Scottish footballer
