= George Thomson (footballer, fl. 1932–1946) =

Scottish footballer

Personal information
- Place of birth: Scotland
- Height: 5 ft 10 in (1.78 m)
- Position: Left half

Senior career*
Years	Team	Apps	(Gls)
–	St Roch's		
1932–1946	Aberdeen	213	(16)
1946	Dunfermline Athletic	0	(0)
- * Club domestic league appearances and goals

George Thomson was a Scottish footballer who played as a left half, mainly for Aberdeen, where he featured prominently between 1933 and the outbreak of World War II in 1939.

His most notable achievement was appearing in the 1937 Scottish Cup Final which Aberdeen lost 2–1 to Celtic; the Dons were also runners-up in the 1936–37 Scottish Division One table behind Rangers, having been third behind the Old Firm teams the previous season – Thomson missed only six matches across those two campaigns. After playing for several teams during the war (winning the Southern League, Glasgow Cup and Southern League Cup with Rangers in the 1941–42 season), he formally joined Dunfermline Athletic in early 1946, but was released prior to the resumption of official competitions.

== Career statistics ==
Appearances and goals by club, season and competition
Club	Season	League			Scottish Cup		Total	
Club	Season	Division	Apps	Goals	Apps	Goals	Apps	Goals
Aberdeen	1932–33	Scottish Division One	3	0	0	0	3	0
Aberdeen	1933–34	Scottish Division One	33	2	4	1	37	3
Aberdeen	1934–35	Scottish Division One	36	2	7	1	43	3
Aberdeen	1935–36	Scottish Division One	34	6	5	2	39	8
Aberdeen	1936–37	Scottish Division One	36	0	5	0	41	0
Aberdeen	1937–38	Scottish Division One	33	2	4	0	37	2
Aberdeen	1938–39	Scottish Division One	38	4	6	0	44	4
Aberdeen	1939–40	Scottish Division One	5*	0	0	0	5*	0
Aberdeen	1940–41	Competitive Football Cancelled Due to WW2						
Aberdeen	1941–42	Competitive Football Cancelled Due to WW2						
Aberdeen	1942–43	Competitive Football Cancelled Due to WW2						
Aberdeen	1943–44	Competitive Football Cancelled Due to WW2						
Aberdeen	1944–45	Competitive Football Cancelled Due to WW2						
Aberdeen	Total		213	16	31	4	244	20

*Games played before league season was suspended – not counted in official records
