= 1938–39 Aberdeen F.C. season =

Aberdeen F.C.
1938–39 season
- Manager: Dave Halliday
- Scottish League Division One: 3rd
- Scottish Cup: Bi Champion
- Top goalscorer: League: George Hamilton (15); All: George Hamilton; Bill Strauss (16)
- Highest home attendance: 34,000 vs. Queen of the South, 4 March
- Lowest home attendance: 5,000 vs. Queen of the South 1 April

The 1938–39 season was Aberdeen's 34th season in the top flight of Scottish football and their 35th season overall. Aberdeen competed in the Scottish League Division One and the Scottish Cup.

== Results ==
=== Division One ===
Match Day	Date	Opponent	H/A	Score	Aberdeen Scorer(s)	Attendance
1	13 August	Partick Thistle	A	1–2	Armstrong	20,000
2	20 August	Third Lanark	H	6–1	Warnock (2), McKenzie (2), Strauss, Armstrong	18,000
3	24 August	Partick Thistle	H	3–0	Armstrong (2), Hamilton	30,000
4	27 August	Celtic	A	2–1	Hamilton (2)	23,000
5	3 September	Motherwell	H	0–0		20,000
6	10 September	Arbroath	A	2–0	Nicholson, Smith	8,000
7	14 September	Third Lanark	A	1–1	Strauss	8,000
8	17 September	St Johnstone	H	3–0	Williams (2), McKenzie	17,000
9	24 September	Hibernian	A	0–5		14,000
10	1 October	Falkirk	H	4–1	Williams, Hamilton, McKenzie, Strauss	6,000
11	8 October	St Mirren	A	1–3	Hamilton	8,000
12	15 October	Ayr United	H	5–2	Armstrong (2), Brady, Warnock, Strauss	12,000
13	22 October	Heart of Midlothian	A	2–5	Hamilton, Strauss	20,000
14	29 October	Clyde	H	1–2	Nicholson (penalty)	16,000
15	5 November	Hamilton Academical	H	5–0	Strauss (2), Armstrong, Smith, Hamilton	12,000
16	12 November	Queen's Park	A	1–2	Thomson	15,000
17	19 November	Kilmarnock	H	1–2	Strauss	12,000
18	26 November	Queen of the South	A	1–1	Biggs	7,500
19	3 December	Raith Rovers	H	6–3	Brady (2), Strauss (2), Hamilton, Biggs	9,000
20	10 December	Albion Rovers	H	2–1	Biggs, Grant	13,000
21	17 December	Rangers	A	2–5	Armstrong, Biggs	30,000
22	24 December	Celtic	H	3–1	Armstrong, Biggs, Warnock	23,000
23	31 December	Motherwell	A	2–2	Hamilton, Biggs	7,000
24	2 January	Arbroath	H	4–0	Hamilton (2), Patillio, Thomson	19,000
25	3 January	Ayr United	A	3–3	Hamilton, Patillio, Thomson	8,000
26	7 January	Hibernian	H	6–1	Patillio (4), Hamilton, Strauss	16,000
27	14 January	Falkirk	A	3–1	Strauss, Warnock, Patillio	7,000
28	28 January	St Mirren	H	3–2	Patillio, Nicholson (penalty), Warnock	10,000
29	11 February	St Johnstone	A	0–1		5,500
30	25 February	Heart of Midlothian	H	4–3	Patillio (2), Hamilton (2)	19,000
31	7 March	Clyde	A	1–1	Hamilton	3,000
32	11 March	Hamilton Academical	A	0–1		2,000
33	18 March	Queen's Park	H	2–1	Patillio, Thomson	10,000
34	1 April	Queen of the South	H	4–3	Biggs (2), Brady, Strauss	5,000
35	5 April	Kilmarnock	A	3–0	Armstrong (2), Nicholson (penalty)	7,000
36	8 April	Raith Rovers	A	2–3	Hamilton, Biggs	4,000
37	22 April	Albion Rovers	A	0–1		4,000
38	29 April	Rangers	H	2–0	Smith, Armstrong	15,000

==== Final standings ====
Pos	Team	Pld	W	D	L	GF	GA	GD	Pts
1	Rangers	38	25	9	4	112	55	+57	59
2	Celtic	38	20	8	10	99	53	+46	48
3	Aberdeen	38	20	6	12	91	61	+30	46
4	Heart of Midlothian	38	20	5	13	98	70	+28	45
5	Falkirk	38	19	7	12	73	63	+10	45

Source: RSSSF

=== Scottish Cup ===
Round	Date	Opponent	H/A	Score	Aberdeen Scorer(s)	Attendance
R1	21 January	Albion Rovers	H	1–0	Strauss	19,106
R2	4 February	Queen's Park	H	5–1	Biggs (2), Hamilton, Patillio, Nicolson (penalty)	23,214
R3	18 February	Falkirk	A	3–2	Strauss (2), Patillio	17,280
QF	4 March	Queen of the South	H	2–0	Patillio (2)	34,950
SF	25 March	Motherwell	N	1–1	Warnock	81,756
SFR	29 March	Motherwell	N	1–3	Scott	40,539

== Squad ==
=== Appearances & Goals ===
No.	Pos	Nat	Player	Total		Division One		Scottish Cup	
No.	Pos	Nat	Player	Apps	Goals	Apps	Goals	Apps	Goals
	GK	(Scotland) SCO	George Johnstone	40	0	34	0	6	0
	GK	(South Africa) SOU	Pat Kelly	4	0	4	0	0	0
	DF	(England) ENG	Sid Nicholson	41	5	35	4	6	1
	DF	(Scotland) SCO	Frank Dunlop	36	0	30	0	6	0
	DF	(England) ENG	Wilfred Adey	32	0	26	0	6	0
	DF	(Scotland) SCO	Andy Cowie	22	0	16	0	6	0
	DF	(Scotland) SCO	Willie Cooper (c)	14	0	14	0	0	0
	DF	??	Robert Graham	10	0	10	0	0	0
	DF	(Scotland) SCO	Donald Grant	4	1	4	1	0	0
	DF	(Scotland) SCO	Willie Waddell	3	0	3	0	0	0
	MF	??	George Thomson	44	4	38	4	6	0
	MF	(South Africa) SOU	Bill Strauss	37	15	31	12	6	3
	MF	(Scotland) SCO	Arthur Biggs	28	11	23	9	5	2
	MF	(Scotland) SCO	Dave Warnock	24	7	18	6	6	1
	MF	(Scotland) SCO	Tom Brady	13	4	13	4	0	0
	MF	(Wales) WAL	Charlie Smith	13	3	13	3	0	0
	MF	(Scotland) SCO	George Taylor	5	0	5	0	0	0
	MF	(Scotland) SCO	Dick Donald	2	0	2	0	0	0
	MF	(Scotland) SCO	Archie Baird	0	0	0	0	0	0
	MF	(South Africa) SOU	Herbert Currer	0	0	0	0	0	0
	FW	(Scotland) SCO	George Hamilton	42	18	37	17	5	1
	FW	(Scotland) SCO	Matt Armstrong	28	13	27	13	1	0
	FW	(Scotland) SCO	Jock Pattillo	14	15	9	11	5	4
	FW	(Scotland) SCO	Johnny McKenzie	10	4	10	4	0	0
	FW	(Scotland) SCO	George Scott	10	1	8	0	2	1
	FW	(South Africa) SOU	Stan Williams	5	3	5	3	0	0
	FW	(Scotland) SCO	Willie Hume	3	0	3	0	0	0
