= James Daley =

James Daley may refer to:

- James P. Daley, former American soldier
- Jimmy Daley (born 1973), cricketer
- Jim Daley, Canadian football coach
- James Daly (mutineer) (died 1920), sometimes spelled Daley
- James A. Daley, American ambassador
- James Daley (sprinter), winner of the 60 yards at the 1929 USA Indoor Track and Field Championships

== See also ==
- James Daly (disambiguation)
- Jimmy Dailey (1927–2002), Scottish footballer
