= Charlie McGill =

Scottish footballer

Personal information
- Date of birth: 3 February 1903
- Place of birth: Kilmarnock, Scotland
- Date of death: 1988 (aged 84–85)
- Place of death: Fall River, Massachusetts, United States
- Height: 5 ft 9 in (1.75 m)
- Position: Left back

Senior career*
Years	Team	Apps	(Gls)
1921 –1922	Darvel		
1922–1923	Queen of the South		
1923–1924	Heart of Midlothian	6	(0)
1924	→ Solway Star (loan)		
1924–1925	Third Lanark	25	(0)
1925–1931	Fall River	223	(0)
1929	→ Boston Soccer Club (loan)	20	(0)
1930	→ Boston Bears (loan)	3	(0)
1931–1938	Aberdeen	218	(1)
1938–1939	Forres Mechanics		
1939–1940	Forfar Athletic	0	(0)

International career
1935	Scottish League XI	1	(0)
- * Club domestic league appearances and goals

Charles McGill (3 February 1903 – 1988) was a Scottish footballer who played as a left back. He spent much of his career in the United States, most of it with Fall River, where he won the American Soccer League three times (1925–26, 1928–29 and 1930). He returned to Scotland in 1931 where he spent seven years with Aberdeen, being part of the team that finished in third place in 1935–36 Scottish Division One table and runners-up in 1936–37, although he was not selected for the 1937 Scottish Cup Final.

McGill was selected once for the Scottish Football League XI against the English Football League XI in 1935.

== Career statistics ==
=== Club ===
Appearances and goals by club, season and competition
Club	Season	League			National Cup		Total	
Club	Season	Division	Apps	Goals	Apps	Goals	Apps	Goals
Heart of Midlothian	1923–24	Scottish Division One	6	0	0	0	6	0
Third Lanark	1924–25	Scottish Division One	25	0	1	0	26	0
Fall River	1925–26	American Soccer League	31	0	0	0	31	0
Fall River	1926–27	American Soccer League	32	0	0	0	32	0
Fall River	1927–28	American Soccer League	51	0	1	0	52	0
Fall River	1928–29	American Soccer League	53	0	0	0	53	0
Fall River	Fall 1929	American Soccer League	20	0	0	0	20	0
Fall River	1930	American Soccer League	21	0	1	0	22	0
Fall River	1931	American Soccer League	15	0	3	0	18	0
Fall River	Total		223	0	5	0	228	0
Boston Soccer Club (loan)	Fall 1929	American Soccer League	20	0	0	0	20	0
Boston Bears (loan)	1929–30	American Soccer League	3	0	0	0	3	0
Aberdeen	1931–32	Scottish Division One	23	0	1	0	24	0
Aberdeen	1932–33	Scottish Division One	38	1	3	0	41	1
Aberdeen	1933–34	Scottish Division One	38	0	4	0	42	0
Aberdeen	1934–35	Scottish Division One	38	0	7	0	45	0
Aberdeen	1935–36	Scottish Division One	35	0	5	0	40	0
Aberdeen	1936–37	Scottish Division One	25	0	1	0	26	0
Aberdeen	1937–38	Scottish Division One	21	0	1	0	22	0
Aberdeen	Total		218	1	22	0	240	1
Career total			495	1	28	0	523	1
