= 1934–35 Aberdeen F.C. season =

Aberdeen F.C.
1934–35 season
- Chairman: John Robertson
- Manager: Paddy Travers
- Scottish League Division One: 6th
- Scottish Cup: Semi-finalists
- Top goalscorer: League: Matt Armstrong (30); All: Matt Armstrong (38)
- Highest home attendance: 40,105 vs. Celtic, 9 March
- Lowest home attendance: 6,000 vs. Queen's Park 1 December

The 1934–35 season was Aberdeen's 30th season in the top flight of Scottish football and their 31st season overall. Aberdeen competed in the Scottish League Division One and the Scottish Cup.

== Results ==
=== Division One ===
Match Day	Date	Opponent	H/A	Score	Aberdeen Scorer(s)	Attendance
1	11 August	Partick Thistle	A	1–2	Moore	14,000
2	18 August	Falkirk	H	1–0	Thomson	10,000
3	22 August	Queen of the South	H	1–0	Warnock	11,000
4	25 August	Hibernian	A	3–2	Thomson (penalty), Mills, Armstrong	14,000
5	1 September	Dunfermline Athletic	H	3–0	Armstrong (2), Spittal	11,000
6	8 September	Dundee	A	0–0		18,000
7	12 September	Hamilton Academical	A	1–6	Armstrong	4,500
8	15 September	Motherwell	H	2–2	Armstrong (2)	16,000
9	22 September	Celtic	A	1–4	Warnock	6,000
10	24 September	Kilmarnock	H	1–3	R. Smith	14,000
11	29 September	Airdrieonians	H	1–3	Armstrong	7,000
12	6 October	Ayr United	A	3–0	Armstrong, Benyon, Mills	4,000
13	13 October	St Mirren	H	1–0	Armstrong	8,000
14	20 October	Kilmarnock	A	3–1	Falloon, Mills, Benyon	6,000
15	27 October	Albion Rovers	A	1–1	Armstrong	4,000
16	3 November	Clyde	H	2–1	Mills, Armstrong	7,000
17	10 November	St Johnstone	H	2–0	R. Smith, Benyon	7,000
18	17 November	Rangers	A	2–2	Mills, R. Smith	18,000
19	24 November	Heart of Midlothian	H	1–0	Armstrong	16,000
20	1 December	Queen's Park	H	5–0	Armstrong (3), Johnston, Mills,	6,000
21	8 December	Queen of the South	A	1–2	Armstrong	7,000
22	15 December	Hamilton Academical	H	3–3	R. Smith, Fraser, Armstrong	8,000
23	22 December	Partick Thistle	H	3–0	Armstrong (2), Benyon	8,000
24	29 December	Falkirk	A	2–3	Armstrong (2)	7,000
25	1 January	Dundee	H	3–0	Mills, Armstrong, Devers	20,000
26	2 January	Dunfermline Athletic	A	1–1	Armstrong	7,000
27	5 January	Hibernian	H	2–0	Mills, Armstrong	8,500
28	12 January	Motherwell	A	2–1	Mills, Conwell	5,500
29	19 January	Celtic	H	2–0	Armstrong, R. Smith	20,000
30	2 February	Airdrieonians	A	1–4	R. Smith	4,000
31	16 February	Ayr United	H	7–1	Armstrong (3), R. Smith (2), Mills, Warnock	7,000
32	2 March	St Mirren	A	0–3		8,000
33	16 March	Albion Rovers	H	1–1	Armstrong	7,000
34	23 March	Clyde	A	1–1	Adam	7,000
35	3 April	St Johnstone	A	1–1	Armstrong	3,000
36	13 April	Rangers	H	1–3	Mills	17,000
37	20 April	Heart of Midlothian	A	1–2	R. Smith	18,000
38	27 April	Queen's Park	A	1–1	Mills	5,000

==== Final standings ====
Pos	Team	Pld	W	D	L	GF	GA	GD	Pts
4	Hamilton Academical	38	19	10	9	87	67	+20	48
5	St Johnstone	38	18	10	10	66	46	+20	46
6	Aberdeen	38	17	10	11	68	54	+14	44
7	Motherwell	38	15	10	13	83	64	+19	40
8	Dundee	38	16	8	14	63	63	0	40

Source: RSSSF

=== Scottish Cup ===
Round	Date	Opponent	H/A	Score	Aberdeen Scorer(s)	Attendance
R1	26 January	Falkirk	A	3–2	Armstrong (2), Mills	14,000
R2	9 February	Albion Rovers	H	4–0	Armstrong (2), Mills, R. Smith	19,359
R3	23 February	Hibernian	H	0–0		23,626
R3 R	27 February	Hibernian	A	1–1	Mills	21,000
R3 R	4 March	Hibernian	A	3–2	Armstrong (2), Thomson	22,943
QF	9 March	Celtic	H	3–1	Armstrong (2 penalties), Mills	40,105
SF	30 March	Hamilton Academical	N	1–2	Mills	31,924

== Squad ==
=== Appearances & Goals ===
No.	Pos	Nat	Player	Total		Division One		Scottish Cup	
No.	Pos	Nat	Player	Apps	Goals	Apps	Goals	Apps	Goals
	GK	(Scotland) SCO	Steve Smith	43	0	36	0	7	0
	GK	(Scotland) SCO	Doug Westland	2	0	2	0	0	0
	DF	(Scotland) SCO	Willie Cooper	45	0	38	0	7	0
	DF	(Scotland) SCO	Charlie McGill	45	0	38	0	7	0
	DF	(Scotland) SCO	Bob Fraser (c)	43	1	36	1	7	0
	DF	(Scotland) SCO	Charlie Gavin	9	0	6	0	3	0
	DF	(Scotland) SCO	Dick Ritchie	2	0	2	0	0	0
	DF	(Scotland) SCO	Douglas Anderson	1	0	1	0	0	0
	DF	(Scotland) SCO	Claud Sharp	0	0	0	0	0	0
	MF	??	George Thomson	43	3	36	2	7	1
	MF	(Wales) WAL	Jackie Beynon	37	4	32	4	5	0
	MF	(Scotland) SCO	Ritchie Smith	36	10	29	9	7	1
	MF	(Northern Ireland) NIR	Eddie Falloon	36	1	32	1	4	0
	MF	(Scotland) SCO	Dave Warnock	22	3	20	3	2	0
	MF	(Scotland) SCO	Bert Johnston	9	1	7	1	2	0
	MF	(Scotland) SCO	John Spittal	8	1	8	1	0	0
	MF	(Ireland) IRE	Joe O'Reilly	0	0	0	0	0	0
	FW	(Scotland) SCO	Matt Armstrong	43	39	36	31	7	8
	FW	(Scotland) SCO	Willie Mills	40	16	33	11	7	5
	FW	(Ireland) IRE	Paddy Moore	12	1	8	1	4	0
	FW	(Scotland) SCO	Laurie Conwell	7	1	6	1	1	0
	FW	(Scotland) SCO	Hugh Adam	4	1	4	1	0	0
	FW	(Scotland) SCO	Tommy Devers	4	1	4	1	0	0
	FW	(Scotland) SCO	Dick Donald	3	0	3	0	0	0
	FW	(Scotland) SCO	Jim Westland	1	0	1	0	0	0
