= Jim Daly =

Jim Daly may refer to:

- Jim Daly (politician) (born 1972), Irish Fine Gael politician
- Jim Daly (evangelist) (born 1961), American social conservative leader
- Jim Daly (actor) (born 1934), Australian actor

== See also ==
- James Daly (disambiguation)
- Jim Daley, coach
- Jimmy Daly (1904–?), Irish footballer
