= Caledonia Trophy =

- Organiser(s): ADFA / HFL
- Founded: 1948; 77 years ago
- Abolished: 1950; 75 years ago
- Region: (Scotland) Highlands and Aberdeen
- Teams: 2
- Last champions: Aberdeen (3rd title)
- Most championships: Aberdeen (3 titles)

The Caledonia Trophy was a short-lived Scottish football competition between Division A club Aberdeen and a Highland League select team. The two-legged competition lasted for three seasons.

== History ==
Aberdeen first suggested the idea in February 1948, which received the backing of the Highland League. The SFA secretary, Mr G. Graham, had the competition rules drawn up.

The same format as the Mitchell Cup was used (Aberdeen played Dundee on a home and away basis). The League president, Mr J. Riggs, supported this format.

Pittodrie hosted the first game and a Highland League stadium had the return match. The trophy was presented by the Express' Saturday newspaper, the Green Final.

Selection for the Highland League representative team was kept simple. Each league club was asked to nominate suitable players from their own team.

In 1948–49, Caledonian FC faced a heavy league programme so no players were released for the Pittodrie match.

In 1949–50, the Highland League were forced to make player alterations for the second leg. Bruce (Caley keeper) withdrew for personal reasons. Wilson and Hope of Elgin City were replaced by Baird and MacDonald of Fort George.

No competition took place in 1950–51. Both parties never agreed on a suitable date for the opening match.

== Results ==
Season	Home team	Score	Away Team	Scorers	Venue	Att	Ref
1947–48	Aberdeen	4–0	Highland League XI	McLaughlin, Kelly (2), McKenna	Pittodrie	9,000	
1947–48	Highland League XI	2–4	Aberdeen	Willox, Day; Stenhouse, Baird, Kelly, McLaughlin	Grant Street Park	5,000	
1947–48	Aberdeen beat Highland League XI 8–2 on aggregate.						
1948–49	Aberdeen	0–1	Highland League XI	Mackenzie	Pittodrie	8,000	
1948–49	Highland League XI	0–1	Aberdeen	Gibson	Grant Street Park	5,600	
1948–49	Trophy shared. Highland League XI and Aberdeen tied 1–1 on aggregate.						
1949–50	Aberdeen	6–2	Highland League XI	Baird, Hamilton (2), Hather (2), Yorston; Donnachie, Mitchell	Pittodrie		
1949–50	Highland League XI	0–6	Aberdeen	Hather (2), Glen, Yorston Stenhouse, Crosbie (o.g.)	Borough Briggs		
1949–50	Aberdeen beat Highland League XI 12–2 on aggregate.						
