= Paddy Moore =

Irish footballer

Personal information
- Date of birth: 4 August 1909
- Place of birth: Ballybough, County Dublin, Ireland
- Date of death: 24 July 1951 (aged 41)
- Place of death: Dublin, Ireland
- Height: 5 ft 6 in (1.68 m)
- Position: Striker

Youth career
- Cloncliffe Celtic
- Bendigo
- 192x–1928: Richmond Rovers

Senior career*
Years	Team	Apps	(Gls)
1928–1929	Shamrock Rovers		
1929	Cardiff City	1	(0)
1930	Merthyr Town	5	(0)
1930	Tranmere Rovers	4	(0)
1930–1932	Shamrock Rovers		(25)
1932–1935	Aberdeen	66	(45)
1935–1937	Shamrock Rovers		(6)
- Shelbourne
1937–1938	Brideville		
1938–19xx	Shamrock Rovers		

International career
1931–1936	Irish Free State	9	(7)
1932	Ireland (IFA)	1	(0)
1932	League of Ireland XI	1	(2)

Managerial career
- 1940s: Stella Maris
- * Club domestic league appearances and goals

Patrick Moore (4 August 1909 – 24 July 1951) was an Irish professional footballer who played for, among others, Shamrock Rovers and Aberdeen. Moore was a dual internationalist and played for both Ireland teams – the FAI XI and the IFA XI.

In February 1934 Moore scored four goals for the FAI XI in a World Cup qualifier against Belgium. As a result, he became the first player ever to score four goals in a World Cup game. However injury and alcoholism combined to blight both his career and life and he was only 41 when he died. In September 2006 Moore was posthumously honoured by Shamrock Rovers at their Legends Ball.

In October 2015 the Shamrock Rovers Heritage Trust unveiled a new gravestone for Moore and his family at Glasnevin Cemetery

== Club career ==
As a youth Moore played for several teams including Richmond Rovers before joining Shamrock Rovers for the first of three spells. In 1929 at the age of 19 he signed for Cardiff City, but made only one appearance. After brief spells with both Merthyr Town and Tranmere Rovers he then returned to Shamrock Rovers. During the 1931–32 season he helped Rovers win both the League of Ireland championship and the League of Ireland Shield. He also helped Rovers win the FAI Cup in both 1931 and 1932, scoring in both finals.

After an impressive performance for the FAI XI against the Netherlands in May 1932, Moore, together with Joe O'Reilly and Jimmy Daly, was one of three Irish players from that team who were then signed by Aberdeen. The trio were signed for a combined fee of less than £1,000. Moore made an impressive start for Aberdeen, scoring 27 goals in 29 Scottish League matches during the 1932–33 season. However, in subsequent seasons his problems with alcoholism began to emerge.

In February 1934 the Aberdeen manager Paddy Travers accompanied Moore while on international duty against Belgium to help keep him away from alcohol. Travers was aware that Moore had developed a drink problem that would end his career prematurely. In May 1935 Moore was selected to play for the FAI XI in an away game against Switzerland but he was declared unfit to play after drinking too heavily while travelling to the game. Other similar incidents resulted in Moore being released by Aberdeen. Moore then returned to Shamrock Rovers and in 1936 helped them win a third FAI Cup by scoring in his third final.

== Irish international ==
When Moore began his international career in 1931 there were, in effect, two Ireland teams, chosen by two rival associations. Both associations, the Northern Ireland-based IFA and the Irish Free State-based FAI claimed jurisdiction over the whole of Ireland and selected players from the whole island. As a result, several notable Irish players from this era, including Moore, played for both teams.

=== FAI XI ===
Between 1931 and 1936 Moore made 9 appearances and scored 7 goals for the FAI XI. He made his international debut for the FAI XI on 26 April 1931 against Spain. Together with Tom Farquharson, Peter Kavanagh, Jeremiah Robinson and Charlie Dowdall, Moore was part of an FAI XI that gained a respectable 1–1 draw at the Montjuic Stadium in Barcelona. Moore marked his debut by scoring the FAI XI's goal. He gave the visitors the lead in the 35th minute when he received a pass from John Joe Flood and then found himself in a one against one situation with the legendary Spanish goalkeeper, Ricardo Zamora. Moore coolly lobbed the ball over the advancing Zamora and into the back of the goal. The goalkeeper subsequently tore off his shirt in disgust and threw it into the back of the net, suffering the derision of his own fans.

Moore missed the return game against Spain due to injury, but then won his second FAI XI cap against the Netherlands on 5 May 1932. He scored the FAI XI's second goal in a 2–0 victory. Moore shot from twenty yards and bought the 30,000 crowd to their feet. However the highlight of Moore's international career came on 25 February 1934 at Dalymount Park when the FAI XI made their World Cup debut in a qualifier against Belgium. He scored all four goals for the FAI XI as they came from 2–0, 3–1 and then 4–3 down to draw 4–4. As a result, Moore became the first player ever to score four goals in a World Cup game. Two months later in another qualifier on 8 April 1934, Moore scored his seventh and last goal for the FAI XI in a 5–2 defeat against the Netherlands.

The other major highlight of Moore's international career came on 17 October 1936 when he masterminded the FAI XI in a 5–2 win against Germany, again at Dalymount Park. Despite not scoring himself, he helped set up four of the goals. He made his last appearance for the FAI XI on 6 December 1936 in 3–2 home defeat against Hungary.

=== IFA XI ===
On 17 October 1932, while playing for Aberdeen, Moore made his one and only appearance for the IFA XI, in a game against England in Blackpool. Together with Jimmy Dunne, Jimmy Kelly and Harry Duggan, Moore was one of four players born in what is now the Republic of Ireland to feature in the IFA XI forward line. Although England won 1–0, the IFA selectors retained the same team for the game against Wales on 7 December. However injury prevented Moore from winning a second IFA XI cap and the 1932 game England remains the only time that Moore and Dunne played together at international level.

== Coaching career ==
During the 1940s Moore coached Stella Maris where he nurtured the talents of future Republic of Ireland international Ronnie Whelan, Sr. Legend has it, Whelan was initially spotted by Moore's wife, who then brought him to the attention of her husband.

== Career statistics ==
=== Appearances and goals by club, season and competition ===
Club	Seasons	League			National Cup		Total	
Club	Seasons	Division	Apps	Goals	Apps	Goals	Apps	Goals
Shamrock Rovers	League of Ireland	1928-29	-	-	-	-	-	-
Shamrock Rovers	Total		-	-	-	-	-	-
Cardiff City	Division Two	1929-30	1	0	-	-	1	0
Cardiff City	Total		1	0	-	-	1	0
Merthyr Town	-	1929-30	5	0	-	-	5+	0+
Merthyr Town	Total		5	0	-	-	5+	0+
Tranmere Rovers	Third Division North	1929-30	4	0	-	-	4+	0+
Tranmere Rovers	Total		4	0	-	-	4+	0+
Aberdeen	Scottish Division One	1932-33	29	27	1	1	30	28
Aberdeen	Scottish Division One	1933-34	29	17	3	1	32	18
Aberdeen	Scottish Division One	1934-35	8	1	4	0	12	1
Aberdeen	Total		66	45	8	2	74	47
Career total			76+	45+	8+	2+	84+	47+

== Honours ==
Shamrock Rovers

- League of Ireland: 1931–32
- FAI Cup: 1931, 1932, 1936
- League of Ireland Shield: 1931–32
- Leinster Senior Cup: 1930, 1933

== Sources ==
- Sean Ryan (1997). The Boys in Green – The FAI International Story.
- Byrne, Peter (1996). Football Association of Ireland: 75 years. Dublin: Sportsworld. pp. 33–36 passim. ISBN 1-900110-06-7.
- Paul Doolan; Robert Goggins. The Hoops. ISBN 0-7171-2121-6.
