= 1937–38 Aberdeen F.C. season =

Aberdeen F.C.
1937–38 season
- Manager: Paddy Travers to December), Dave Halliday (from December)
- Scottish League Division One: 3rd
- Scottish Cup: 3rd Round
- Top goalscorer: League: Matt Armstrong (20 goals); All: Matt Armstrong (23 goals)
- Highest home attendance: 27,000 vs. Celtic, 25 September
- Lowest home attendance: 5,500 vs. Queen of the South 11 December

The 1937–38 season was Aberdeen's 33rd season in the top flight of Scottish football and their 34th season competed in the Scottish League Division One and the Scottish Cup.

== Results ==
=== Division One ===
Match Day	Date	Opponent	H/A	Score	Aberdeen Scorer(s)	Attendance
1	14 August	St Mirren	H	4–0	Armstrong (3), Mills	19,000
2	21 August	Falkirk	A	1–4	Armstrong	18,000
3	24 August	St Mirren	A	1–2	Armstrong	12,500
4	28 August	Partick Thistle	H	3–1	Lang, Devine, Armstrong	18,000
5	1 September	Clyde	H	5–2	Devine (2), Armstrong (2), Lang	12,000
6	4 September	Third Lanark	A	0–2		12,000
7	8 September	Third Lanark	H	1–0	McKenzie	17,000
8	11 September	Dundee	H	2–3	Armstrong (2), Lang	26,000
9	15 September	Falkirk	H	1–2	Lang	12,000
10	18 September	Motherwell	A	1–2	Blair	8,500
11	25 September	Celtic	H	1–1	McKenzie	27,000
12	27 September	Arbroath	H	3–0	Thomson (2), Matt Armstrong	10,000
13	2 October	St Johnstone	A	1–1	Warnock	5,000
14	9 October	Hibernian	H	5–0	Warnock (3), Scott, Armstrong	10,000
15	16 October	Ayr United	A	1–4	Warnock	8,000
16	23 October	Morton	A	5–3	R. Smith (2), Armstrong, Strauss, Warnock	13,000
17	6 November	Heart of Midlothian	H	0–0		22,000
18	13 November	Clyde	A	1–2	Warnock	5,000
19	20 November	Hamilton Academical	A	1–0	Strauss	4,500
20	27 November	Queen's Park	H	1–1	Mills	10,000
21	4 December	Kilmarnock	A	3–3	Mills, Fraser, Scott	6,000
22	11 December	Queen of the South	H	2–3	Mills, Strauss	5,500
23	18 December	Arbroath	A	3–3	Strauss, Brady	5,000
24	25 December	Partick Thistle	H	1–3	Mills	7,000
25	1 January	Dundee	A	1–0	Mills	22,000
26	3 January	Ayr United	H	4–0	Brady, R. Smith, Mills, Armstrong	15,000
27	8 January	Motherwell	H	4–0	R. Smith, Armstrong, Mills	16,000
28	15 January	Celtic	A	2–5	Brady, Mills (penalty)	20,000
29	29 January	St Johnstone	H	4–0	Armstrong, Brady, Strauss, Mills	7,500
30	5 February	Hibernian	H	1–1	Mills	11,000
31	19 February	Morton	H	4–1	Mills (2 including 1 penalty), R. Smith, Armstrong	10,000
32	26 February	Rangers	A	2–2	Armstrong, McKenzie	35,000
33	12 March	Heart of Midlothian	A	1–2	Armstrong	10,000
34	19 March	Queen of the South	A	0–1		4,500
35	26 March	Hamilton Academical	A	1–0	R. Smith	7,000
36	5 April	Queen's Park	A	1–1	Scott	6,000
37	10 April	Kilmarnock	H	2–1	Warnock, Armstrong	11,000
38	13 April	Rangers	H	0–3		18,000

==== Final standings ====
Pos	Team	Pld	W	D	L	GF	GA	GD	Pts
4	Falkirk	38	19	9	10	82	52	+30	47
5	Motherwell	38	17	10	11	78	69	+9	44
6	Aberdeen	38	15	9	14	74	59	+15	39
7	Partick Thistle	38	15	9	14	68	70	−2	39
8	St Johnstone	38	16	7	15	78	81	−3	39

Source: RSSSF

=== Scottish Cup ===
Round	Date	Opponent	H/A	Score	Aberdeen Scorer(s)	Attendance
R1	22 January	Elgin City	A	6–1	Armstrong (2), Mills (2), Brady, Strauss	8,403
R2	12 February	St Johnstone	H	5–1	Armstrong, Strauss, C. Smith, Brady, Mills	21,297
R3	5 March	East Fife	A	1–1	Mills	9,000
R3R	9 March	East Fife	H	1–2	C. Smith	25,499

== Squad ==
=== Appearances & Goals ===
No.	Pos	Nat	Player	Total		Division One		Scottish Cup	
No.	Pos	Nat	Player	Apps	Goals	Apps	Goals	Apps	Goals
	GK	(Scotland) SCO	George Johnstone	42	0	38	0	4	0
	DF	(Scotland) SCO	Willie Cooper	36	0	32	0	4	0
	DF	(Scotland) SCO	Bob Fraser (c)	31	1	28	1	3	0
	DF	(Scotland) SCO	Charlie McGill	22	0	21	0	1	0
	DF	(England) ENG	Sid Nicholson	19	0	15	0	4	0
	DF	(Scotland) SCO	Frank Dunlop	17	0	16	0	1	0
	DF	(Scotland) SCO	Joe Devine	11	3	11	3	0	0
	DF	(Scotland) SCO	Bob Temple	10	0	10	0	0	0
	DF	(Scotland) SCO	John Newton	9	0	8	0	1	0
	DF	(England) ENG	James Robey	4	0	2	0	2	0
	DF	(Scotland) SCO	Dick Ritchie	2	0	2	0	0	0
	DF	(England) ENG	Wilfred Adey	0	0	0	0	0	0
	MF	??	George Thomson	37	2	33	2	4	0
	MF	(South Africa) SOU	Bill Strauss	23	7	19	5	4	2
	MF	(Scotland) SCO	Tom Brady	16	6	14	4	2	2
	MF	(Northern Ireland) NIR	Eddie Falloon	16	0	16	0	0	0
	MF	(Scotland) SCO	Ritchie Smith	14	5	14	5	0	0
	MF	(Scotland) SCO	Dave Warnock	13	8	13	8	0	0
	MF	(Scotland) SCO	Johnny Lang	12	4	12	4	0	0
	MF	(Wales) WAL	Charlie Smith	11	4	8	2	3	2
	MF	(Scotland) SCO	George Erskine	3	0	3	0	0	0
	MF	(Scotland) SCO	George Taylor	1	0	1	0	0	0
	MF	(Wales) WAL	Jackie Beynon	0	0	0	0	0	0
	MF	(South Africa) SOU	Herbert Currer	0	0	0	0	0	0
	FW	(Scotland) SCO	Matt Armstrong	38	23	34	20	4	3
	FW	(Scotland) SCO	Johnny McKenzie	29	3	26	3	3	0
	FW	(Scotland) SCO	Willie Mills	23	17	19	13	4	4
	FW	(Scotland) SCO	Willie Scott	12	2	12	2	0	0
	FW	(Scotland) SCO	George Scott	10	1	10	1	0	0
	FW	(South Africa) SOU	Stan Williams	1	0	1	0	0	0
	FW	(Scotland) SCO	George Hamilton	0	0	0	0	0	0
	FW	(Scotland) SCO	Willie Hume	0	0	0	0	0	0
	FW	??	?? Webster	0	0	0	0	0	0
