= 1936–37 Aberdeen F.C. season =

Aberdeen F.C.
1936–37 season
- Chairman: Francis John Whitehead
- Manager: Paddy Travers
- Scottish League Division One: 2nd
- Scottish Cup: Runners-up
- Top goalscorer: League: Bill Strauss (26); All: Bill Strauss (33)
- Highest home attendance: 30,000 vs. Rangers, 20 March
- Lowest home attendance: 10,000 vs. Third Lanark 12 September vs. Queen of the South 20 February

The 1936–37 season was Aberdeen's 32nd season in the top flight of Scottish football and their 33rd season competed in the Scottish League Division One and the Scottish Cup.

== Results ==
=== Division One ===
Match Day	Date	Opponent	H/A	Score	Aberdeen Scorer(s)	Attendance
1	8 August	Hibernian	A	3–1	Benyon, Armstrong, Lang	23,000
2	15 August	Arbroath	H	4–0	McKenzie (2), Mills, Benyon	18,000
3	19 August	Hibernian	H	1–1	Armstrong	15,000
4	22 August	St Mirren	A	4–1	Armstrong (2), Strauss (2)	15,000
5	29 August	Falkirk	H	4–0	Strauss (4)	17,000
6	5 September	Partick Thistle	A	2–0	Strauss, Mills	23,000
7	9 September	Arbroath	A	4–1	Scott (2), Strauss, Benyon	12,000
8	12 September	Third Lanark	H	2–2	Benyon, Mills	10,000
9	19 September	Dundee	A	2–2	Armstrong, Mills	26,000
10	26 September	Motherwell	H	2–0	Strauss, Benyon	24,000
11	28 September	Queen's Park	H	2–1	Mills, Strauss	17,000
12	3 October	Celtic	A	2–3	Armstrong, Strauss	46,000
13	10 October	Dunfermline Athletic	H	3–1	Armstrong (3)	14,000
14	17 October	Queen of the South	A	3–2	Strauss (2), McKenzie	17,000
15	24 October	St Johnstone	H	4–1	Strauss (2), Armstrong, Mills	12,000
16	31 October	Morton	H	4–1	Strauss (2), Benyon, Armstrong	14,500
17	7 November	Rangers	A	1–2	Mills	57,000
18	14 November	Heart of Midlothian	A	0–2		35,000
19	21 November	Clyde	H	3–0	Mills (2), Warnock	14,500
20	28 November	Hamilton Academical	H	3–0	Armstrong (2), Strauss	14,500
21	5 December	Queen's Park	A	1–1	Armstrong	4,000
22	12 December	Kilmarnock	H	2–0	Fraser, Armstrong	14,500
23	19 December	St Mirren	H	5–4	Strauss (2), Armstrong, Scott, own goal	14,000
24	26 December	Falkirk	A	2–1	Strauss, Warnock	11,000
25	1 January	Dundee	H	3–1	Mills (2), Armstrong	28,000
26	2 January	Dunfermline Athletic	A	2–2	McKenzie, Strauss	5,000
27	9 January	Partick Thistle	H	4–2	Strauss (2), Mills, Benyon	17,000
28	16 January	Third Lanark	A	0–2		18,000
29	23 January	Celtic	H	1–0	Warnock	28,000
30	6 February	Third Lanark	A	0–1		10,000
31	20 February	Queen of the South	H	1–1	Strauss	10,000
32	20 March	Rangers	H	1–1	Mills	30,000
33	24 March	Albion Rovers	A	5–1	Mills (2), Scott, Armstrong	4,000
34	27 March	Heart of Midlotian	H	4–0	Armstrong (2), Strauss	16,000
35	29 March	St Johnstone	A	1–2	R. Smith	6,000
36	7 April	Clyde	A	0–0		7,00
37	10 April	Hamilton Academical	A	2–3	Benyon, Lang	3,500
38	28 April	Kilmarnock	A	2–1	Armstrong (2)	2,000

==== Final standings ====
Pos	Team	Pld	W	D	L	GF	GA	GD	Pts
1	Rangers	38	26	9	3	88	32	+56	61
2	Aberdeen	38	23	8	7	89	44	+45	54
3	Celtic	38	22	8	8	89	58	+31	52
4	Motherwell	38	22	7	9	96	54	+42	51
5	Heart of Midlothian	38	24	3	11	99	60	+39	51

Source: RSSSF

=== Scottish Cup ===
Round	Date	Opponent	H/A	Score	Aberdeen Scorer(s)	Attendance
R1	30 January	Inverness Thistle	H	6–0	Strauss (3), Armstrong (3)	2,372
R2	13 February	Third Lanark	H	4–1	Strauss (2), Dunlop, McKenzie	25,314
QF	17 March	Hamilton Academical	A	2–1	Armstrong, Strauss	12,000
SF	3 April	Morton	N	2–0	Armstrong, Strauss	31,970
F	24 April	Celtic	N	1–2	Armstrong	146,433

== Squad ==
=== Appearances & Goals ===
No.	Pos	Nat	Player	Total		Division One		Scottish Cup	
No.	Pos	Nat	Player	Apps	Goals	Apps	Goals	Apps	Goals
	GK	(Scotland) SCO	Steve Smith	29	0	29	0	0	0
	GK	(Scotland) SCO	George Johnstone	14	0	9	0	5	0
	DF	(Scotland) SCO	Willie Cooper	42	0	37	0	5	0
	DF	(Scotland) SCO	Frank Dunlop	30	1	25	0	5	1
	DF	(Scotland) SCO	Charlie McGill	26	0	25	0	1	0
	DF	(Scotland) SCO	Bob Fraser (c)	18	1	18	1	0	0
	DF	(Scotland) SCO	Bob Temple	14	0	10	0	4	0
	DF	(Scotland) SCO	Dick Ritchie	3	0	2	0	1	0
	DF	(Scotland) SCO	Duncan Urquhart	2	0	2	0	0	0
	DF	(Scotland) SCO	Joe Devine	2	0	2	0	0	0
	MF	??	George Thomson	41	0	36	0	5	0
	MF	(Northern Ireland) NIR	Eddie Falloon	38	0	34	0	4	0
	MF	(South Africa) SOU	Bill Strauss	34	30	30	24	4	6
	MF	(Wales) WAL	Jackie Beynon	28	9	25	9	3	0
	MF	(Scotland) SCO	Johnny Lang	11	2	9	2	2	0
	MF	(Scotland) SCO	Dave Warnock	8	3	8	3	0	0
	MF	(Scotland) SCO	Ritchie Smith	3	1	3	1	0	0
	FW	(Scotland) SCO	Matt Armstrong	41	30	36	24	5	6
	FW	(Scotland) SCO	Johnny McKenzie	41	5	36	4	5	1
	FW	(Scotland) SCO	Willie Mills	36	15	31	15	5	0
	FW	(Scotland) SCO	Willie Scott	7	3	6	3	1	0
	FW	(Scotland) SCO	George Scott	5	1	5	1	0	0
