= Dave Warnock =

Scottish footballer (1910–1976)

Personal information
- Full name: David Carslaw Warnock
- Date of birth: 25 December 1910
- Place of birth: Busby, Scotland
- Date of death: 19 March 1976 (aged 65)
- Place of death: Aberdeen, Scotland
- Height: 5 ft 8 in (1.73 m)
- Position: Outside right

Senior career*
Years	Team	Apps	(Gls)
–	Banks O' Dee		
1930–1939	Aberdeen	133	(39)
1939–1940	Dundee	4	(2)
Total		137	(41)
- * Club domestic league appearances and goals

David Carslaw Warnock (25 December 1910 – 19 March 1976) was a Scottish footballer who played as an outside right. His main spell as a professional was at Aberdeen where he featured regularly, though not always a first choice, between 1931 and 1939 when he moved on to Dundee; however, the outbreak of World War II meant he never made an official competitive appearance for the Dens Park club.

== Career statistics ==
Appearances and goals by club, season and competition
Club	Season	League			Scottish Cup		Total	
Club	Season	Division	Apps	Goals	Apps	Goals	Apps	Goals
Aberdeen	1930–31	Scottish Division One	0	0	0	0	0	0
Aberdeen	1931–32	Scottish Division One	14	2	1	0	15	2
Aberdeen	1932–33	Scottish Division One	12	2	1	0	13	2
Aberdeen	1933–34	Scottish Division One	30	6	4	0	34	6
Aberdeen	1934–35	Scottish Division One	20	3	2	0	22	3
Aberdeen	1935–36	Scottish Division One	18	9	3	0	21	9
Aberdeen	1936–37	Scottish Division One	8	3	0	0	8	3
Aberdeen	1937–38	Scottish Division One	13	8	0	0	13	8
Aberdeen	1938–39	Scottish Division One	18	6	6	1	24	7
Aberdeen	Total		133	39	17	1	150	40
Dundee	1939–40	Scottish Division Two	4*	2*	–	–	4*	2*
Career total			137	41	17	1	154	42

*Games played before league season was suspended
