= 1935–36 Aberdeen F.C. season =

Aberdeen F.C.
1935–36 season
- Chairman: Francis John Whitehead
- Manager: Paddy Travers
- Scottish League Division One: 3rd
- Scottish Cup: Quarter-finalists
- Top goalscorer: League: Matt Armstrong (30); All: Matt Armstrong (31)
- Highest home attendance: 34,500 vs. Rangers, 23 November
- Lowest home attendance: 7,000 vs. Airdireonias 18 January

The 1935–36 season was Aberdeen's 31st season in the top flight of Scottish football and their 32nd season overall. Aberdeen competed in the Scottish League Division One and the Scottish Cup.

== Results ==
=== Division One ===
Match Day	Date	Opponent	H/A	Score	Aberdeen Scorer(s)	Attendance
1	10 August	Celtic	A	3–1	Lang (2), Armstrong	28,000
2	17 August	Motherwell	A	2–2	Armstrong (2)	10,000
3	24 August	Hibernian	H	3–1	Armstrong (2), Mills	15,000
4	28 August	Clyde	H	3–1	McKenzie, Mills, Lang	8,000
5	31 August	Dunfermline Athletic	A	2–0	Mills, Armstrong	10,000
6	7 September	Ayr United	H	3–0	McKenzie, Lang, Benyon	12,000
7	14 September	Airdrieoniasn	A	4–3	Lang, Mills, Armstrong, McKenzie	7,000
8	21 September	Dundee	H	4–1	Armstrong (3), Lang	16,000
9	23 September	Hamilton Academical	H	3–0	Mills, McKenzie, Lang	20,000
10	28 September	Third Lanark	A	1–5	Lang	9,000
11	5 October	Partick Thistle	H	4–0	Warnock (2), McKenzie, Devers	10,000
12	12 October	Arbroath	A	1–0	Armstrong	6,000
13	19 October	Queen's Park	H	2–1	Devers (2)	7,500
14	26 October	Kilmarnock	A	5–2	Mills (3), Armstrong, Lang	6,000
15	2 November	Queen of the South	H	4–3	Armstrong (2 penalties), Benyon, Devers	14,000
16	9 November	St Johnstone	A	0–0		7,000
17	16 November	Albion Rovers	A	3–1	McKenzie, Thomson, Mills	6,000
18	23 November	Rangers	H	1–0	Benyon	34,500
19	30 November	Heart of Midlothian	H	2–1	Armstrong (2)	18,000
20	7 December	Clyde	A	3–0	Armstrong (2), Benyon	11,000
21	14 December	Hamilton Academical	A	3–1	Mills, Warnock, Lang	4,000
22	21 December	Celtic	A	3–5	Warnock (2), Armstrong	40,000
23	28 December	Motherwell	H	1–1	McKenzie	17,000
24	1 January	Dundee	A	2–2	Thomson (penalty), Mills	22,000
25	2 January	Dunfermline Athletic	H	3–3	Scott, R. Smith, Mills	16,000
26	4 January	Hibernian	A	4–1	Warnock (2), Scott, McKenzie	22,000
27	11 January	Ayr United	A	1–1	Scott	10,000
28	18 January	Airdireonians	H	2–2	Thomson (penalty), Benyon	7,000
29	1 February	Third Lanark	H	2–0	Warnock (2)	11,000
30	15 February	Partick Thistle	A	3–3	Armstrong (2), Thomson	22,000
31	29 February	Arbroath	H	1–2	Armstrong	9,000
32	14 March	Kilmarnock	H	2–1	Armstrong, Mills	8,000
33	21 March	Queen of the South	A	1–1	Armstrong	9,000
34	28 March	St Johnstone	H	3–0	Mills (penalty), Armstrong, Beynon	7,000
35	4 April	Queen's Park	A	1–0	Beynon	4,000
36	11 April	Albion Rovers	H	6–1	Armstrong (4), Mills, Thomson	10,000
37	25 April	Heart of Midlothian	A	2–1	Mills, Armstrong	18,000
38	29 April	Rangers	A	3–2	Beynon, Mills, Thomson	12,000

==== Final standings ====
Pos	Team	Pld	W	D	L	GF	GA	GD	Pts
1	Celtic	38	32	2	4	115	33	+82	66
2	Rangers	38	27	7	4	110	43	+67	61
3	Aberdeen	38	26	9	3	96	50	+46	61
4	Motherwell	38	18	12	8	77	58	+19	48
5	Heart of Midlothian	38	20	7	11	88	55	+33	47

Source: RSSSF

=== Scottish Cup ===
Round	Date	Opponent	H/A	Score	Aberdeen Scorer(s)	Attendance
R1	29 January	Hamilton Academical	H	4–1	Benyon (2), Mills, McKenzie	12,718
R2	8 February	King's Park	H	6–0	Mills (2), Lang (2), Armstrong, Thomson	13,613
R3	22 February	St Johnstone	H	1–1	Lang	32,468
R3 R	26 February	St Johnstone	A	1–0	Thomson (penalty)	21,843
QF	7 March	Rangers	H	0–1		41,633

== Squad ==
=== Appearances & Goals ===
No.	Pos	Nat	Player	Total		Division One		Scottish Cup	
No.	Pos	Nat	Player	Apps	Goals	Apps	Goals	Apps	Goals
	GK	(Scotland) SCO	Steve Smith	33	0	30	0	3	0
	GK	(Scotland) SCO	Doug Westland	10	0	8	0	2	0
	DF	(Scotland) SCO	Willie Cooper	43	0	38	0	5	0
	DF	(Scotland) SCO	Bob Fraser (c)	42	0	37	0	5	0
	DF	(Scotland) SCO	Charlie McGill	40	0	35	0	5	0
	DF	(Scotland) SCO	Charlie Gavin	5	0	5	0	0	0
	DF	(Scotland) SCO	Dick Ritchie	3	0	3	0	0	0
	DF	(Scotland) SCO	Duncan Urquhart	3	0	3	0	0	0
	DF	(Scotland) SCO	Joe Devine	1	0	1	0	0	0
	MF	??	George Thomson	39	8	34	6	5	2
	MF	(Northern Ireland) NIR	Eddie Falloon	39	0	34	0	5	0
	MF	(Scotland) SCO	Johnny Lang	31	13	26	10	5	3
	MF	(Wales) WAL	Jackie Beynon	31	10	29	8	2	2
	MF	(Scotland) SCO	Dave Warnock	21	9	18	9	3	0
	MF	(Scotland) SCO	Ritchie Smith	4	1	4	1	0	0
	MF	(Scotland) SCO	William Reid	0	0	0	0	0	0
	FW	(Scotland) SCO	Johnny McKenzie	39	9	35	8	4	1
	FW	(Scotland) SCO	Willie Mills	38	20	33	17	5	3
	FW	(Scotland) SCO	Matt Armstrong	35	31	30	30	5	1
	FW	(Scotland) SCO	Tommy Devers	7	4	7	4	0	0
	FW	(Scotland) SCO	Willie Scott	5	3	5	3	0	0
	FW	(Scotland) SCO	Joe Brown	4	0	3	0	1	0
