= 1942–43 Aberdeen F.C. season =

Aberdeen F.C.
1942–43 season
- Manager: Dave Halliday
- North Eastern League: 1st (Series 1), 1st (Series 2)
- North Eastern Football League Cup 1: Winners
- Mitchell Cup: Winners
- Top goalscorer: League: Jock Pattillo (32); All: Jock Pattillo (42)
- Highest home attendance: 16,000 vs. Heart of Midlothian "A", 27 February
- Lowest home attendance: 10,000 vs. Raith Rovers, 8 August

== Results ==
=== North Eastern League Series 1 ===
Match Day	Date	Opponent	H/A	Score	Aberdeen Scorer(s)	Attendance
1	8 August	Raith Rovers	H	3–1	Pattillo (2), Dryden	2,000
2	15 August	Dunfermline Athletic	H	5–0	Pattillo (2), Taylor (penalty), Howe, Mutch	4,000
3	22 August	Rangers "A"	A	1–2	Pattillo	7,000
4	29 August	Heart of Midlothian	H	4–1	Pattillo (3), Bain	7,000
5	5 September	Hibernian "A"	H	6–3	Pattillo (3), Bain (2), Taylor (penalty)	7,000
6	12 September	Dundee United	A	4–0	Pattillo, Armstrong, Gourlay, Dryden	6,000
7	19 September	East Fife	A	1–0	Gourlay	4,000
8	26 September	Rangers "A"	H	4–2	Gourlay (2), Dunlop, Taylor	0
9	3 October	Dunfermline Athletic	A	3–1	Taylor (penalty), Ferguson, Nichol	2,000
10	10 October	Raith Rovers	H	8–1	Gourlay (4), Pattillo (3), Ferguson	10,000
11	17 October	Hibernian "A"	A	7–0	Ferguson (3), Hamilton (2), Bain, Dryden	0
12	24 October	Dundee United	H	1–0	Pattillo	7,000
13	31 October	East Fife	H	1–1	Pattillo	6,000
14	7 November	Heart of Midlothian "A"	A	3–5	Gourlay (2), Ferguson	7,000

==== Final League table ====
Pos	Team	Pld	W	D	L	GF	GA	GD	Pts
1	Aberdeen	14	11	1	2	48	16	+32	23
2	Dunfermline Athletic	14	10	0	4	28	23	+5	20
3	East Fife	14	8	1	5	27	19	+8	17

=== North Eastern League Series 2 ===
Match Day	Date	Opponent	H/A	Score	Aberdeen Scorer(s)	Attendance
1	1 January	Dundee United	A	0–1		8,000
2	2 January	Rangers "A"	H	2–1	Pattillo, Ferguson	7,000
3	9 January	Raith Rovers	H	2–0	Pattillo (2)	5,000
4	16 January	Hibernian "A"	A	5–0	Pattillo (2), Ferguson, Gourlay, Dryden	0
5	23 January	Dunfermline Athletic	H	4–1	Ancell, Dryden, Dunlop, Pattillo	6,000
6	30 January	East Fife	A	0–1		2,500
7	6 February	Heart of Midlothian "A"	A	6–2	Pattillo (5), Gourlay	2,500
8	13 February	Dundee United	H	3–0	Pattillo (2), Mortensen	6,000
9	20 February	Rangers "A"	A	2–1	Harvey (2), Dyer	3,000
10	27 February	Heart of Midlothian "A"	H	8–3	Gourlay (4), Mortensen (2), Pattillo, Dryden	16,000
11	6 March	East Fife	H	4–1	Gourlay, Mortensen, Pattillo, Dryden	5,000
12	13 March	Raith Rovers	A	1–1	Mortensen	3,000
13	20 March	Hibernian "A"	H	2–0	Ferguson, Armstrong	0
14	27 March	Dunfermline Athletic	A	0–0		2,000

==== Final League table ====
Pos	Team	Pld	W	D	L	GF	GA	GD	BP	Pts
1	Aberdeen	14	10	2	2	39	12	+27	7	29
2	East Fife	14	9	2	3	38	23	+15	5	25
3	Raith Rovers	14	9	1	4	42	34	+8	4	23

Rules for classification: Bonus points: 3 points were awarded for an away win, 2 points for an away draw

=== North Eastern Cup ===
Round	Date	Opponent	H/A	Score	Aberdeen Scorer(s)	Attendance
R1 L1	21 November	Heart of Midlothian "A"	H	9–1	Hamilton (4), Gourlay (2), Dryden, Pattillo, Ferguson	6,000
R1 L2	28 November	Heart of Midlothian "A"	A	6–0	Hamilton (3), Gourlay (2), Ferguson	2,000
SF L1	5 December	Raith Rovers	A	6–2	Pattillo (2), Dryden, Ancell, Taylor, Ferguson	2,000
SF L2	12 December	Raith Rovers	H	5–1	Pattillo (2), Ferguson (2), Ancell	8,000
F L1	19 December	Dunfermline Athletic	A	3–2	Gourlay (3)	3,500
F L2	26 December	Dunfermline Athletic	H	6–1	Pattillo (3), Ancell (2), Gourlay	12,000

=== Mitchell Cup ===
Round	Date	Opponent	H/A	Score	Aberdeen Scorer(s)	Attendance
R1 L1	3 April	Dunfermline Athletic	A	2–1	Cooper, Ancell	3,500
R1 L2	10 April	Dunfermline Athletic	H	3–2	Williams, Dyer (penalty), Anderson	12,000
SF L1	24 April	Hibernian "A"	A	1–1	Ferguson	10,000
SF L2	1 May	Hibernian "A"	H	2–1	Armstrong (2)	13,000
F L1	15 May	Raith Rovers	A	1–1	Ferguson	9,000
F L2	22 May	Raith Rovers	H	6–2	Pattillo (2), Dryden, Dyer (penalty), Mortensen, McSpadyen	14,000

== Squad ==
=== Unofficial Appearances & Goals ===
No.	Pos	Nat	Player	Total		North Eastern League Series 1 & 2		North Eastern Cup		Mitchell Cup	
No.	Pos	Nat	Player	Apps	Goals	Apps	Goals	Apps	Goals	Apps	Goals
	GK	(Scotland) SCO	George Johnstone	37	0	27	0	4	0	6	0
	GK	(England) ENG	John Moody	2	0	0	0	2	0	0	0
	GK	??	Laurence Gage	1	0	1	0	0	0	0	0
	DF	(Scotland) SCO	Charlie Gavin	40	0	28	0	6	0	6	0
	DF	(Scotland) SCO	Frank Dunlop	38	2	26	2	6	0	6	0
	DF	(Scotland) SCO	Willie Cooper (c)	38	1	28	0	6	0	4	1
	DF	(England) ENG	Alex Dyer	33	3	21	1	6	0	6	2
	DF	(Scotland) SCO	Bobby Ancell	26	6	16	1	4	4	6	1
	DF	(Scotland) SCO	Andrew Beattie	4	0	2	0	0	0	2	0
	MF	(Scotland) SCO	George Taylor	39	5	27	4	6	1	6	0
	MF	??	Frederick Taylor	8	0	8	0	0	0	0	0
	MF	(South Africa) SOU	Bill Strauss	2	0	2	0	0	0	0	0
	MF	??	John Girdwood	1	0	1	0	0	0	0	0
	MF	??	John Cruickshank	1	0	0	0	0	0	1	0
	FW	(Scotland) SCO	Jock Pattillo	34	42	27	32	6	8	1	2
	FW	??	Alex Gourlay	27	25	19	17	6	8	2	0
	FW	(Scotland) SCO	Charlie Ferguson	24	16	14	9	6	5	4	2
	FW	(Scotland) SCO	Billy Bain	10	4	10	4	0	0	0	0
	FW	(England) ENG	Stan Mortensen	7	6	6	5	0	0	1	1
	FW	(Scotland) SCO	George Hamilton	6	9	4	2	2	7	0	0
	FW	(Scotland) SCO	Matt Armstrong	5	4	3	2	0	0	2	2
	FW	(Scotland) SCO	George Mutch	5	1	3	1	0	0	2	0
	FW	(Scotland) SCO	Alex McSpayden	4	1	0	0	0	0	4	1
	FW	??	?? Anderson	3	1	0	0	0	0	3	1
	FW	??	James Nicol	2	1	2	1	0	0	0	0
	FW	(Scotland) SCO	Percy Dickie	2	0	2	0	0	0	0	0
	FW	??	Joseph Harvey	1	1	1	1	0	0	0	0
	FW	(South Africa) SOU	Stan Williams	1	1	0	0	0	0	1	1
	FW	(Scotland) SCO	Johnny McKenzie	1	0	1	0	0	0	0	0
	FW	??	?? Newman	1	0	0	0	0	0	1	0
	FW	(England) ENG	Robert Gurney	1	0	0	0	0	0	1	0
	??	??	John Dryden	31	10	24	7	6	2	1	1
	??	??	Leslie Howe	3	1	3	1	0	0	0	0
	??	??	?? Allison	1	0	1	0	0	0	0	0
	??	??	?? Sharpe	1	0	1	0	0	0	0	0
