= 1939–40 Dundee F.C. season =

Dundee
1939–40 season
- Manager: Andy Cunningham
- Eastern Division: 7th
- Scottish War Emergency Cup: First round
- Top goalscorer: League: Archie Coats (26); All: Archie Coats (30)
Home colours

The 1939–40 season was intended to be the forty-fifth season in which Dundee competed at a Scottish national level, and the second season playing in the second tier. After just 4 league games however, the Scottish Football League suspended its competition on 13 September 1939 after the outbreak of World War II. A month later, Dundee would join the Eastern Division of the Scottish War Emergency League for the rest of the season. Dundee would also compete in the Scottish War Emergency Cup in lieu of the suspended Scottish Cup, and were knocked out in the 1st round by Third Lanark over two legs. The club would retire from club football until 1944 due to the ongoing war.

== Scottish Division Two ==
Statistics provided by Dee Archive.

Match day	Date	Opponent	H/A	Score	Dundee scorer(s)	Attendance
1	12 August	Raith Rovers	H	5–1	McGillivray (3), Coats, Adam	11,000
2	19 August	Airdrieonians	A	4–2	Adam, Warnock, Coats (2)	2,000
3	26 August	Dunfermline Athletic	H	3–1	Warnock, Coats, Adam	12,000
4	2 September	Greenock Morton	A	1–1	McGillivray	4,000

== Scottish War Emergency League ==
Statistics provided by Dee Archive.

Match day	Date	Opponent	H/A	Score	Dundee scorer(s)	Attendance
1	21 October	Hibernian	H	2–1	Adam (2)	4,500
2	28 October	Dunfermline Athletic	A	0–2		3,000
3	4 November	Alloa Athletic	H	1–1	Wattie	1,000
4	11 November	Raith Rovers	A	1–2	Adam	2,500
5	18 November	Arbroath	H	9–3	Adam (3), Wattie (2), Coats (2), Easson, Cook	3,000
6	25 November	Falkirk	A	1–6	Cook	2,500
7	2 December	St Johnstone	A	2–2	Adam, Coats	2,500
8	9 December	Heart of Midlothian	H	4–6	Adam, Follon, Easson, Coats	3,670
9	16 December	King's Park	H	5–0	Cook, McGillivray (2), Coats (2)	1,700
10	23 December	Stenhousemuir	A	3–0	McGillivray, Easson, Coats	900
11	30 December	Aberdeen	H	3–1	Coats (2), Adam	4,297
12	1 January	Dundee United	A	1–2	McGillivray	5,500
13	2 January	St Bernard's	H	2–2	McGillivray (2)	1,276
14	6 January	Cowdenbeath	A	1–1	Coats	
15	13 January	East Fife	H	2–0	Coats, Morgan	2,500
16	10 February	Raith Rovers	H	2–3	Easson, Cook	2,500
17	17 February	Arbroath	A	1–3	McGillivray	
18	9 March	Alloa Athletic	A	2–2	Coats (2)	
19	16 March	King's Park	A	3–3	Hill, Adam, McGillivray	1,000
20	30 March	Aberdeen	A	0–3		4,000
21	3 April	Hibernian	A	0–6		
22	6 April	Dundee United	H	2–1	Coats, Adam	8,000
23	8 April	Dunfermline Athletic	H	2–2	Coats, McGillivray	2,500
24	13 April	St Bernard's	A	0–0		
25	17 April	Stenhousemuir	H	7–1	Coats (4), D. Davidson, McGillivray, Cook	600
26	29 April	East Fife	A	0–3		
27	4 May	St Johnstone	H	7–2	Coats (4), J. Davidson, Adam (2)	1,500
28	11 May	Heart of Midlothian	A	3–2	Adam, J. Davidson, Coats	1,500
29	18 May	Falkirk	H	4–2	Adam, Coats (2), McGillivray	3,000

=== Emergency League table ===
Eastern division
Pos	Team	Pld	W	D	L	GF	GA	GD	Pts
5	St Johnstone	29	13	8	8	84	69	+15	34
6	Alloa Athletic	29	13	4	12	56	60	−4	30
7	Dundee	29	11	8	10	70	62	+8	30
8	Hibernian	29	12	5	12	82	65	+17	29
9	Dundee United	29	12	2	15	68	77	−9	26

== Scottish War Emergency Cup ==
Statistics provided by Dee Archive.

Match day	Date	Opponent	H/A	Score	Dundee scorer(s)	Attendance
1st round, 1st leg	24 February	Third Lanark	H	1–1	McGillivray	7,000
1st round, 2nd leg	2 March	Third Lanark	A	1–3	Adam	8,600
Third Lanark won 4–2 on aggregate

== Player statistics ==
Statistics provided by Dee Archive

No.	Pos	Nat	Player	Total		War League		War Cup		Division Two	
No.	Pos	Nat	Player	Apps	Goals	Apps	Goals	Apps	Goals	Apps	Goals
	FW	(Scotland) SCO	Hugh Adam	29	19	24	15	2	1	3	3
	DF	(Scotland) SCO	Bob Allan	16	0	14	0	0	0	2	0
	FW	(Scotland) SCO	Archie Coats	34	30	28	26	2	0	4	4
	FW	(Scotland) SCO	Willie Cook	32	5	26	5	2	0	4	0
	FW	(Scotland) SCO	Doug Davidson	1	1	1	1	0	0	0	0
	FW	(Scotland) SCO	J. Davidson	2	2	2	2	0	0	0	0
	FW	(Scotland) SCO	Jimmy Easson	15	4	15	4	0	0	0	0
	DF	(Scotland) SCO	Gerry Follon	10	1	9	1	1	0	0	0
	GK	(Scotland) SCO	William Gillespie	1	0	1	0	0	0	0	0
	FW	(Scotland) SCO	George Hill	10	1	9	1	1	0	0	0
	MF	(Scotland) SCO	Andy Kemp	2	0	2	0	0	0	0	0
	DF	(England) ENG	Norman Kirby	25	0	19	0	2	0	4	0
	GK	(Scotland) SCO	Johnny Lynch	32	0	26	0	2	0	4	0
	MF	(Scotland) SCO	Bill Masson	16	0	16	0	0	0	0	0
	GK	(Scotland) SCO	Jim Mathieson	2	0	2	0	0	0	0	0
	FW	(Scotland) SCO	Charlie McGillivray	30	16	24	11	2	1	4	4
	DF	(Scotland) SCO	Ronnie McWalter	1	0	1	0	0	0	0	0
	FW	(Scotland) SCO	Andrew Morgan	1	0	1	0	0	0	0	0
	MF	(Scotland) SCO	Jimmy Morgan	29	1	23	1	2	0	4	0
	FW	(Scotland) SCO	Henry Morris	1	0	1	0	0	0	0	0
	DF	(Scotland) SCO	Bill Peattie	7	0	7	0	0	0	0	0
	DF	(Scotland) SCO	Bobby Rennie	26	0	22	0	2	0	2	0
	MF	(Scotland) SCO	Bobby Ross	8	0	8	0	0	0	0	0
	FW	(Scotland) SCO	John Ross	1	0	1	0	0	0	0	0
	MF	(Scotland) SCO	Harry Sneddon	22	0	16	0	2	0	4	0
	MF	(Scotland) SCO	George Stewart	21	0	15	0	2	0	4	0
	FW	(Scotland) SCO	Dave Warnock	4	2	0	0	0	0	4	2
	FW	(Scotland) SCO	John Wattie	7	3	6	3	0	0	1	0

== See also ==
- List of Dundee F.C. seasons
