= Steve Smith (footballer, born 1899) =

Scottish footballer

Personal information
- Full name: Stephen Smith
- Date of birth: 20 February 1899
- Place of birth: Aberdeen, Scotland
- Date of death: 27 December 1994 (aged 95)
- Place of death: Pinellas, Florida, United States
- Height: 5 ft 9 1/2 in (1.77 m)
- Position: Goalkeeper

Youth career
- Hall Russell's

Senior career*
Years	Team	Apps	(Gls)
1921–1922	Chicago Thistle		
1922–1923	Chicago All Scots		
1923–1930	Brooklyn Wanderers	246	(0)
1930–1938	Aberdeen	235	(0)
- * Club domestic league appearances and goals

Stephen Smith (20 February 1899 – 27 December 1994) was a Scottish association football goalkeeper who began his career in the United States and ended it with Aberdeen.

In 1921, Smith joined Thistle, a team in the Association Football League, an ethnically British league in Chicago. A year later, he was with the All Scots in the same league. At the time, Chicago teams would tour during the off-season and Smith came to the attention of the Brooklyn Wanderers of the American Soccer League. They signed him for the 1923–24 season, but he saw time in only nine games. He became the regular starter the next season, a position he held for much of the next five years. Over the course of his career with the Wanderers, he played 246 league, 11 National Challenge Cup and 12 League Cup games. In 1930, Smith returned to his native Scotland and joined Aberdeen F.C. where he finished his career in 1938.

== Career statistics ==
=== Appearances and goals by club, season and competition ===
Club	Seasons	League			National Cup		League Cup		Total	
Club	Seasons	Division	Apps	Goals	Apps	Goals	Apps	Goals	Apps	Goals
Brooklyn Wanderers	1923-1930	National Association Football League	-	-	-	-	-	-	-	-
Brooklyn Wanderers	Total		246	0	11	0	12	0	269	0
Aberdeen	1930-31	Scottish Division One	31	0	6	0	-	-	37	0
Aberdeen	1931-32	Scottish Division One	37	0	1	0	-	-	38	0
Aberdeen	1932-33	Scottish Division One	38	0	3	0	-	-	41	0
Aberdeen	1933-34	Scottish Division One	33	0	4	0	-	-	37	0
Aberdeen	1934-35	Scottish Division One	36	0	7	0	-	-	43	0
Aberdeen	1935-36	Scottish Division One	30	0	3	0	-	-	33	0
Aberdeen	1936-37	Scottish Division One	29	0	0	0	-	-	29	0
Aberdeen	Total		234	0	24	0	-	-	258	0
Career total			480	0	35	0	12	0	527	0
