= Bob Fraser (footballer) =

Scottish footballer

Personal information
- Full name: Robert Fraser
- Date of birth: 1908
- Place of birth: Motherwell, Scotland
- Date of death: April 1985 (aged 76–77)
- Place of death: South Africa
- Height: 5 ft 9 1/2 in (1.77 m)
- Position: Defender

Senior career*
Years	Team	Apps	(Gls)
- Law Scotia
1927–1931	Albion Rovers	131	(5)
1931–1938	Aberdeen	194	(4)
Total		325	(9)
- * Club domestic league appearances and goals

Robert Fraser was a Scottish professional football defender who played for Albion Rovers and Aberdeen.

Fraser joined Aberdeen in 1931, and was appointed team captain in 1934. He emigrated to South Africa in 1938, a year after visiting the country on the club's summer tour.

At representative level, he took part in a Scottish Football Association tour of North America in the summer of 1935, but none of the fixtures was a full international.

== Career statistics ==
Appearances and goals by club, season and competition
Club	Season	League			Scottish Cup		Total	
Club	Season	Division	Apps	Goals	Apps	Goals	Apps	Goals
Aberdeen	1931–32	Scottish Division One	21	0	1	0	22	0
Aberdeen	1932–33	Scottish Division One	25	1	1	0	26	1
Aberdeen	1933–34	Scottish Division One	29	0	4	0	33	0
Aberdeen	1934–35	Scottish Division One	36	1	7	0	43	1
Aberdeen	1935–36	Scottish Division One	37	0	5	0	42	0
Aberdeen	1936–37	Scottish Division One	18	1	0	0	18	1
Aberdeen	1937–38	Scottish Division One	28	1	3	0	31	1
Aberdeen	Total		194	4	21	0	215	4
