= Willie Cooper =

Scottish footballer

Personal information
- Full name: William Cooper
- Date of birth: 24 October 1909
- Place of birth: Aberdeen, Scotland
- Date of death: 18 May 1994 (aged 84)
- Place of death: Aberdeen, Scotland
- Height: 5 ft 10 in (1.78 m)
- Position: Full back

Senior career*
Years	Team	Apps	(Gls)
–	Mugiemoss		
1927–1948	Aberdeen	331	(2)

International career
1934–1935	Scottish League XI	2	(0)
- * Club domestic league appearances and goals

William Cooper (24 October 1909 – 18 May 1994) was a professional footballer who played as a full back for Aberdeen, his only club at the professional level.

Cooper played junior football with Mugiemoss before starting his professional career with Aberdeen in 1927. He played almost 400 official games for the club in a 20-year career which was temporarily halted by the Second World War in 1939 (he also made over 180 appearances in the unofficial regional competitions held during the conflict, several of which were won by the Dons, culminating in the nationwide 1946 Southern League Cup Final which his team won before a crowd of 135,000 at Hampden Park). After regular competitions resumed, Cooper played a large part in Aberdeen's 1946–47 Scottish Cup run but missed the final through injury; the Scottish Football Association gave Aberdeen permission to award him a winners' medal, despite him not playing on the day. He had also collected runners-up medals from the Scottish Cup in 1937, and the Scottish League Cup in 1947.

He represented the Scottish League XI twice, before the war.

== Career statistics ==
=== Club ===
Appearances and goals by club, season and competition

Appearances and goals by club, season and competition
Club	Season	League			Scottish Cup		League Cup		Total	
Club	Season	Division	Apps	Goals	Apps	Goals	Apps	Goals	Apps	Goals
Aberdeen	1927-28	Scottish Division One	2	0	0	0	-	-	2	0
Aberdeen	1928-29	Scottish Division One	3	0	0	0	-	-	3	0
Aberdeen	1929-30	Scottish Division One	14	0	0	0	-	-	14	0
Aberdeen	1930-31	Scottish Division One	20	0	2	0	-	-	22	0
Aberdeen	1931-32	Scottish Division One	37	0	1	0	-	-	38	0
Aberdeen	1932-33	Scottish Division One	34	0	3	0	-	-	37	0
Aberdeen	1933-34	Scottish Division One	38	2	4	0	-	-	42	2
Aberdeen	1934-35	Scottish Division One	38	0	7	0	-	-	45	0
Aberdeen	1935-36	Scottish Division One	38	0	5	0	-	-	43	0
Aberdeen	1936-37	Scottish Division One	37	0	5	0	-	-	42	0
Aberdeen	1937-38	Scottish Division One	32	0	4	0	-	-	36	0
Aberdeen	1938-39	Scottish Division One	14	0	0	0	-	-	14	0
Aberdeen	1939-40	Scottish Division One	3*	0	0	0	-	-	3*	0
Aberdeen	1940-41	Competitive Football Cancelled Due to WW2								
Aberdeen	1941-42	Competitive Football Cancelled Due to WW2								
Aberdeen	1942-43	Competitive Football Cancelled Due to WW2								
Aberdeen	1943-44	Competitive Football Cancelled Due to WW2								
Aberdeen	1944-45	Competitive Football Cancelled Due to WW2								
Aberdeen	1945-46	Competitive Football Cancelled Due to WW2								
Aberdeen	1946-47	Scottish Division One	14	0	6	1	9	0	29	1
Aberdeen	1947-48	Scottish Division One	7	0	0	0	0	0	7	0
Aberdeen	Total		331	2	37	1	9	0	377	3
Career total			331	2	37	1	9	0	377	3

*Games played before league season was suspended

== Honours ==
Aberdeen

- Scottish Cup: 1947
  - Runner-up: 1937
