= Jackie Beynon =

Welsh footballer (1909–1937)

Personal information
- Full name: John Alfred Beynon
- Date of birth: 22 September 1909
- Place of birth: Cardiff, Wales
- Date of death: 26 June 1937 (aged 27)
- Place of death: Johannesburg, South Africa
- Height: 5 ft 6 in (1.68 m)
- Position: Outside left

Senior career*
Years	Team	Apps	(Gls)
?–1932	Great Western Colliery		
1927–1928	West Bromwich Albion		
1928–1929	Halifax Town		
1929–1930	Scunthorpe United		
1930–1932	Rotherham United		
1932–1933	Doncaster Rovers		
1933–1937	Aberdeen	126	(34)
- * Club domestic league appearances and goals

John Alfred Beynon [sometimes mis-spelt Benyon] (22 September 1909 – 26 June 1937) was a Welsh footballer who played for Doncaster Rovers and Aberdeen until his death from peritonitis on a club tour of South Africa in 1937.

Beynon signed for Aberdeen in February 1933 from Doncaster Rovers (having earlier played for other clubs in the Yorkshire and Lincolnshire region, namely Halifax Town, Scunthorpe United and Rotherham United) and established himself as the outside left in the Dons' first team, although he switched to the right wing at times, particularly following the arrival of Bill Strauss in 1936. A few weeks after playing in the 1937 Scottish Cup Final, he was struck down with appendicitis while on a tour of South Africa with Aberdeen and died of peritonitis. He was buried in South Africa.

== Career statistics ==
Club	Season	League			Scottish Cup		Total	
Club	Season	Division	Apps	Goals	Apps	Goals	Apps	Goals
Aberdeen	1932-33	Scottish Division One	5	2	0	0	5	2
Aberdeen	1933-34	Scottish Division One	35	11	4	1	39	12
Aberdeen	1934-35	Scottish Division One	32	4	5	0	37	4
Aberdeen	1935-36	Scottish Division One	29	8	2	2	31	10
Aberdeen	1936-37	Scottish Division One	25	9	3	0	28	9
Aberdeen	1937-38	Scottish Division One	0	0	0	0	0	0
Aberdeen	Total		126	34	14	3	140	37
