= Frank Dunlop (footballer) =

Scottish footballer

Personal information
- Date of birth: 28 April 1913
- Place of birth: Glasgow, Scotland
- Date of death: 1991 (aged 77–78)
- Place of death: Aberdeen, Scotland
- Position: Right-half

Youth career
- Benburb

Senior career*
Years	Team	Apps	(Gls)
1936–1948	Aberdeen	117	(0)
Total		117	(0)
- * Club domestic league appearances and goals

Frank Dunlop (28 April 1913 – 1991) was a Scottish professional football right-half who played for Aberdeen.

== Playing career ==
Dunlop was born in Glasgow and signed for Aberdeen from Junior club Benburb in 1936. Dunlop captained Aberdeen in the 1947 Scottish Cup Final, which Aberdeen won 2–1 against Hibernian.

== Retirement ==
Dunlop retired to South Africa in 1948. He was manager of the Southern Rhodesia team which won the Currie Cup in 1959. He later returned to Aberdeen.

== Career statistics ==
Appearances and goals by club, season and competition
Club	Season	League			Scottish Cup		League Cup		Total	
Club	Season	Division	Apps	Goals	Apps	Goals	Apps	Goals	Apps	Goals
Aberdeen	1936–37	Scottish Division One	25	0	5	1	–	–	30	1
Aberdeen	1937–38	Scottish Division One	16	0	1	0	–	–	17	0
Aberdeen	1938–39	Scottish Division One	30	0	6	0	–	–	36	0
Aberdeen	1939–40	Scottish Division One	5*	0	0	0	–	–	5*	0
Aberdeen	1940–41	Competitive Football Cancelled Due to WW2								
Aberdeen	1941–42	Competitive Football Cancelled Due to WW2								
Aberdeen	1942–43	Competitive Football Cancelled Due to WW2								
Aberdeen	1943–44	Competitive Football Cancelled Due to WW2								
Aberdeen	1944–45	Competitive Football Cancelled Due to WW2								
Aberdeen	1945–46	Competitive Football Cancelled Due to WW2								
Aberdeen	1946–47	Scottish Division One	27	0	7	0	9	0	43	0
Aberdeen	1947–48	Scottish Division One	14	0	1	0	5	0	20	0
Aberdeen	1948–49	Scottish Division One	0	0	0	0	0	0	0	0
Career total			117	0	20	1	14	0	151	1

*Games played before league season was suspended

== Honours ==
Aberdeen

- Scottish Cup: 1947
