= Matt Armstrong =

Scottish footballer

Personal information
- Full name: Matthew Armstrong
- Date of birth: 12 November 1911
- Place of birth: Newton Stewart, Scotland
- Date of death: 4 October 1995 (aged 83)
- Place of death: Aberdeen, Scotland
- Position: Striker

Senior career*
| Years | Team | Apps | (Gls) |
- Port Glasgow Athletic Juniors
| 1931–1945 | Aberdeen | 195 | (137) |
| 1946–1947 | Queen of the South | 27 | (13) |
- Elgin City
- Peterhead
| Total | | 222 | (150) |

International career
| 1935–1936 | Scotland | 3 | (0) |
| 1935–1936 | Scottish League XI | 3 | (1) |
- * Club domestic league appearances and goals

Matthew Armstrong (12 November 1911 – 4 October 1995) was a Scottish professional footballer who played as a striker for Aberdeen and Queen of the South.

== Career ==
Armstrong was born in Newton Stewart and played for Port Glasgow Athletic Juniors before signing for Aberdeen in 1931. His career was interrupted by World War II in 1939 and, after a brief return to Aberdeen, he signed for Queen of the South in the 1946–47 season. He later played for Elgin City and Peterhead before retiring in 1951.

Armstrong won three caps with the Scotland national team.

== Career statistics ==
=== Club ===
Appearances and goals by club, season and competition
| Club | Seasons | League | | | Scottish Cup | | Total | |
| Club | Seasons | Division | Apps | Goals | Apps | Goals | Apps | Goals |
|---|---|---|---|---|---|---|---|---|
| Aberdeen | 1931–32 | Scottish Division One | 9 | 2 | 1 | 1 | 10 | 3 |
| Aberdeen | 1932–33 | Scottish Division One | 7 | 3 | 0 | 0 | 7 | 3 |
| Aberdeen | 1933–34 | Scottish Division One | 12 | 14 | 1 | 0 | 13 | 14 |
| Aberdeen | 1934–35 | Scottish Division One | 36 | 31 | 7 | 8 | 43 | 39 |
| Aberdeen | 1935–36 | Scottish Division One | 30 | 30 | 5 | 1 | 35 | 31 |
| Aberdeen | 1936–37 | Scottish Division One | 36 | 24 | 5 | 6 | 41 | 30 |
| Aberdeen | 1937–38 | Scottish Division One | 34 | 20 | 4 | 3 | 38 | 23 |
| Aberdeen | 1938–39 | Scottish Division One | 27 | 13 | 1 | 0 | 28 | 13 |
| Aberdeen | 1939–40 | Scottish Division One | 4* | 0 | 0 | 0 | 4* | 0 |
| Aberdeen | 1940–41 | League football cancelled due to the Second World War | | | | | | |
| Aberdeen | 1941–42 | League football cancelled due to the Second World War | | | | | | |
| Aberdeen | 1942–43 | League football cancelled due to the Second World War | | | | | | |
| Aberdeen | 1943–44 | League football cancelled due to the Second World War | | | | | | |
| Aberdeen | 1944–45 | League football cancelled due to the Second World War | | | | | | |
| Aberdeen | 1945–46 | League football cancelled due to the Second World War | | | | | | |
| Aberdeen | Total | | 195 | 137 | 24 | 19 | 219 | 156 |
| Queen of the South | 1946–47 | Scottish Division One | 27 | 13 | - | - | 27+ | 13+ |
| Career total | | | 222 | 150 | - | - | 246+ | 169+ |

*Games played before league season was suspended

=== International ===
Appearances and goals by national team and year
| National team | Year | Apps | Goals |
|---|---|---|---|
| Scotland | 1935 | 2 | 0 |
| Scotland | 1936 | 1 | 0 |
| Total | | 3 | 0 |
