= Lynching of George Scott =

1880 lynching in Indiana

- Location: Clay County, Indiana, U.S.
- Date: December 12, 1880
- Attack type: Lynching
- Deaths: 1
- Victim: George Scott

In the early hours of December 12, 1880, a white mob in Clay County, Indiana lynched George Scott, an African American man. Scott had fled after being accused of rape in nearby Eaglesfield, Indiana, and was captured near Indianapolis and brought to the Clay County jail in Brazil, Indiana. Rumors swirled that a mob might form, but the local Sheriff, James Lankford, paid them no heed. However, the man left in charge of the jail, ex-Sheriff Jacob Baumunk, took the precaution of giving the keys to Sheriff Lankford, who would not be on-site at the jail, after locking up. Sometime between one and three in the morning on Sunday, December 12, a mob of over 100 men, masked, descended on the jail and demanded that Baumunk give them the keys. After informing the mob that he did not have the keys, he was told to "retire to his room."

After Baumunk removed himself, the mob began to attack the jail with sledgehammers and the like in order to reach Scott's cell. Between three and four in the morning, Scott was removed from his cell by the mob who took him to a nearby oak tree, where he was hanged. Scott's body remained there until he was discovered by the Clay County Coroner, Dr. George Pell, who transported Scott's body to the courthouse around seven in the morning. Prior to this, Scott's hanged body had been viewed by "several thousand" individuals. After his body was transported to the courthouse, it was "exhibited for public inspection" before finally being released to family members near Indianapolis.
