= Iain Jamieson =

Scottish footballer, manager and businessman

Personal information
- Full name: John Wallace Jamieson
- Date of birth: 14 October 1928
- Place of birth: Dumbarton, Scotland
- Date of death: 19 October 2012 (aged 84)
- Place of death: Kirkcudbright, Scotland
- Position: Wing half

Youth career
- Jamestown Athletic

Senior career*
Years	Team	Apps	(Gls)
1947–1948	Aberdeen	1	(0)
1948–1958	Coventry City	181	(6)
- Rugby Town
Total		182	(6)

Managerial career
- Rugby Town
- * Club domestic league appearances and goals

Iain Jamieson (14 October 1928 – 19 October 2012) was a Scottish footballer, manager and businessman. Jamieson briefly played for Aberdeen, then signed for Coventry City after completing a spell of National Service. He made over 180 appearances in 10 years playing for Coventry. He became player/manager of Rugby Town after leaving Coventry.

Towards the end of his playing career, Jamieson became a sales manager with the textiles company Courtaulds. He later progressed to a managing director position in the company's nylon division. Jamieson joined the Coventry City board of directors, working with Joe Mercer and Jimmy Hill, in 1973. After Hill left the club in 1983, Jamieson was appointed chairman. Jamieson himself left the board in 1984 and retired from business in 1989. He died in October 2012, aged 84.
