= George Scott (footballer, born 1915) =

Scottish footballer

Personal information
- Full name: George Gardiner Scott
- Date of birth: 11 June 1915
- Place of birth: Cowdenbeath, Scotland
- Date of death: 26 July 1942 (aged 27)
- Place of death: Dornoch Firth, off Tain, Scotland
- Position: Inside right

Senior career*
Years	Team	Apps	(Gls)
1930–1931	Parkview Rangers		
1931	Cowdenbeath St Leonard's		
1931	St Andrews United		
1931–	Cowdenbeath		
–1933	Parkview Rangers		
1933	St Andrews United		
1933	Lochgelly Albert		
1933–1936	East Fife	124	(41)
1936	Cowdenbeath St Leonard's		
1936–1939	Aberdeen	22	(2)

International career
- Scotland Schoolboys
- * Club domestic league appearances and goals

George Gardiner Scott (11 June 1915 – 26 July 1942) was a Scottish professional football inside right who played in the Scottish League for East Fife and Aberdeen.

== Personal life ==
Scott attended Lumphinnans Primary School. In 1941, during the Second World War, he enlisted in the RAF and during a period training in Canada, met and married his wife Jessie. Scott returned to Scotland in 1942 and was posted to No. 19 Operational Training Unit at RAF Kinloss. On 26 July 1942, Sergeant Scott, serving as an air gunner on board an Armstrong Whitworth Whitley, took off from RAF Kinloss to conduct a cross-country training exercise. The aircraft suffered engine failure in mid-air, caught fire, and crashed into the Dornoch Firth off Tain, killing all 5 on board, including Scott. The Whitley was attempting to get to RAF Tain when it crashed. His body was not recovered and he is commemorated on the Air Forces Memorial.

== Career statistics ==
Appearances and goals by club, season and competition
Club	Season	League			Scottish Cup		Other		Total	
Club	Season	Division	Apps	Goals	Apps	Goals	Apps	Goals	Apps	Goals
East Fife	1933–34	Scottish Second Division	31	7	1	0	—		32	7
East Fife	1934–35	Scottish Second Division	33	14	0	0	—		33	14
East Fife	1935–36	Scottish Second Division	33	14	1	0	—		34	14
East Fife	1936–37	Scottish Second Division	27	6	3	2	—		30	8
East Fife	Total		124	41	5	2	—		129	43
Aberdeen	1936–37	Scottish First Division	5	1	—		0	0	5	1
Aberdeen	1937–38	Scottish First Division	9	1	0	0	2 (Note: Appearances in Dewar Shield)	0	11	1
Aberdeen	1938–39	Scottish First Division	8	0	2	0	1	0	11	0
Aberdeen	Total		22	2	2	0	3	0	27	2
Career total			146	43	7	2	3	0	156	45
