= Johnny McKenzie (footballer) =

Scottish footballer

Personal information
- Date of birth: c. 1910
- Place of birth: Glasgow, Scotland
- Height: 5 ft 8 in (1.73 m)
- Position: Inside right

Senior career*
Years	Team	Apps	(Gls)
–	Maryhill Hibernians		
1931–1934	Third Lanark	98	(26)
1934–1935	Heart of Midlothian	30	(13)
1935–1938	Aberdeen	107	(19)
1938–1943	Ayr United	25	(9)
–	St Anthony's		
Total		260	(64)
- * Club domestic league appearances and goals

John McKenzie was a Scottish footballer who played as an inside right. He played in the Scottish Football League's top division for four clubs over nine consecutive seasons – Third Lanark, Heart of Midlothian, Aberdeen and Ayr United – before his career was curtailed by World War II.

His most notable achievement was appearing in the 1937 Scottish Cup Final which Aberdeen lost 2–1 to Celtic; the Dons were also runners-up in the 1936–37 Scottish Division One table behind Rangers, having been third behind the Old Firm teams the previous season – McKenzie missed only three matches across those two campaigns. In his single year with Hearts, they also finished third in the league table and lost out in the semi-finals of the 1934–35 Scottish Cup after a replay.

At representative level, he was selected for the Glasgow FA's annual challenge match against Sheffield in October 1933, scoring twice.

== Career statistics ==
=== Appearances and goals by club, season and competition ===
Club	Season	League			Scottish Cup		Total	
Club	Season	Division	Apps	Goals	Apps	Goals	Apps	Goals
Heart of Midlothian	1934-35	Scottish Division One	30	13	7	4	37	17
Aberdeen	1935-36	Scottish Division One	35	8	4	1	39	9
Aberdeen	1936-37	Scottish Division One	36	4	5	1	41	5
Aberdeen	1937-38	Scottish Division One	26	3	3	0	29	3
Aberdeen	1938-39	Scottish Division One	10	4	0	0	10	4
Aberdeen	Total		107	19	12	2	119	21
