= Willie Mills =

Scottish footballer

Personal information
- Full name: William Mills
- Date of birth: 28 January 1915
- Place of birth: Alexandria, Scotland
- Date of death: 1991 (aged 75–76)
- Place of death: Aberdeen, Scotland
- Position: Inside forward

Youth career
- Bridgeton Waverley

Senior career*
Years	Team	Apps	(Gls)
1932–1937	Aberdeen	182	(102)
1937–1939	Huddersfield Town	27	(7)
1939–1940	Dumbarton (wartime guest)	7	(4)
- Clyde
- Lossiemouth
- Huntly
Total		216	(113)

International career
1935–1936	Scotland	3	(0)
- * Club domestic league appearances and goals

William Mills (28 January 1915 – 1991) was a professional footballer, who played for Aberdeen, Huddersfield Town, Dumbarton and Clyde. He was born in Alexandria, West Dunbartonshire, Scotland.

== Playing career ==
Mills was signed by Aberdeen from Junior club Bridgeton Waverley in 1932. He entered their first team almost immediately, aged 17. Mills was primarily a creative player, but also scored frequently and was the club's top goalscorer in the 1933–34 season.

He was transferred to Huddersfield Town in March 1938 for £6,500. Mills did not stay long in English football, however, as the Second World War curtailed league play. After the war concluded he played in the Highland Football League for Lossiemouth and Huntly.

== International ==
Mills represented Scotland three times between October 1935 and December 1936.

== Personal life ==
His brother Hugh 'Bunty' Mills was also a footballer, who began his career at Bridgeton and featured for West Ham.

== Career statistics ==
=== Club ===
Appearances by club, season and competition
Club	Seasons	League			Scottish Cup		Total	
Club	Seasons	Division	Apps	Goals	Apps	Goals	Apps	Goals
Aberdeen	1932–33	Scottish Division One	31	18	3	0	34	18
Aberdeen	1933–34	Scottish Division One	35	28	4	0	39	28
Aberdeen	1934–35	Scottish Division One	33	11	7	5	40	16
Aberdeen	1935–36	Scottish Division One	33	17	5	3	38	20
Aberdeen	1936–37	Scottish Division One	31	15	5	0	36	15
Aberdeen	1937–38	Scottish Division One	19	13	4	4	23	17
Aberdeen	Total		182	102	28	12	210	114
Huddersfield Town	1937–38	First Division	4	1	0	0	4	1
Huddersfield Town	1938–39	First Division	23	6	4	0	27	6
Huddersfield Town	Total		27	7	4	0	31	7
Dumbarton (wartime guest)	1939–40	Western Division	7*	4*	0	0	7*	4*
Career total			216	113	32	12	248	125

* Unofficial wartime appearances

=== International ===
Appearances and goals by national team and year
National team	Year	Apps	Goals
Scotland	1935	2	0
Scotland	1936	1	0
Total		3	0
