= James Daly (mutineer) =

Mutineer in the Connaught Rangers (1899–1920)

Private James Daly
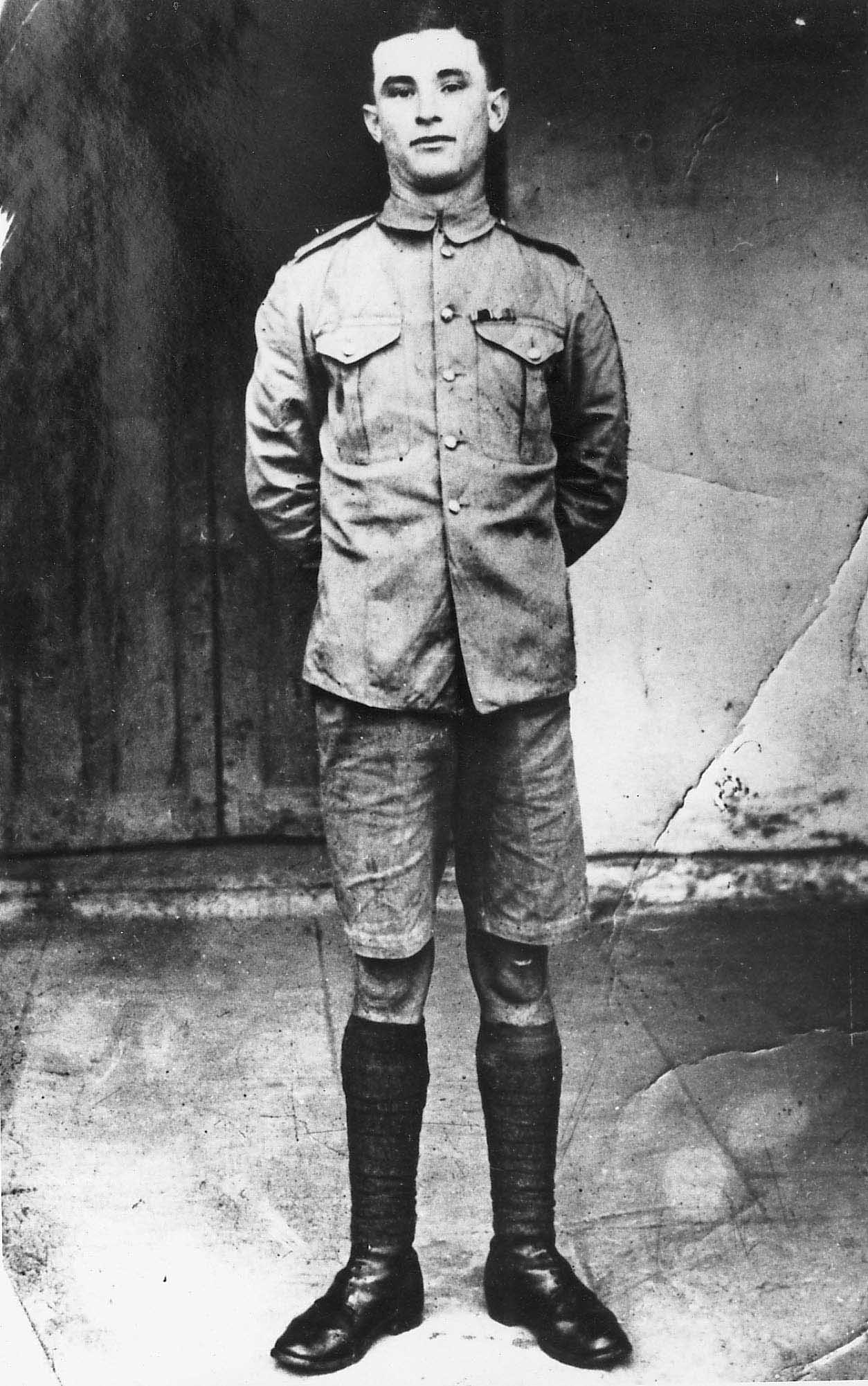
- Private James Daly
- Born: 24 December 1899; Ballymoe, County Galway, Ireland
- Died: 2 November 1920 (aged 20); Dagshai, Himachal Pradesh, India
- Burial place: Glasnevin Cemetery, Dublin
- Military career
- Allegiance: United Kingdom (later mutinied in support of the Irish Republic)
- Branch: British Army
- Service years: 1919–1920
- Rank: Private
- Unit: Connaught Rangers
- Known for: Leading a mutiny in protest of British actions during the Irish War of Independence

Private James Joseph Daly (24 December 1899 – 2 November 1920) was a member of a mutiny of the Connaught Rangers in India in 1920 in protest of the activities of the Royal Irish Constabulary and the Black and Tans in Ireland. He was executed in the aftermath of the mutiny by Crown forces.

== Career ==
The son of James Daly, a baker, and Kate Creane, Daly was born on 24 December 1899 in Ballymoe, County Galway. The family later lived in Tyrrellspass, County Westmeath.

Daly joined the Connaught Rangers in April 1919 and was posted to India.

The revolt originated on 27–28 June 1920 at Wellington Barracks, Jullundur (now Jalandhar), Punjab near the border with modern-day Pakistan, where Daly's brother, William Daly, was involved. It was then spread 200 miles away to other Connaught Rangers companies, at Jutogh (where it failed) and at Solan, where, led by a World War I veteran, Joseph Hawes from Kilrush, County Clare, James Daly and roughly 150 others "ground arms" and refused to return to duty in protest of the activities of the Royal Irish Constabulary and the Black and Tans in Ireland.

They proclaimed their hut "Liberty Hall", raised the Irish tricolour above the hut and then attacked the armory, but were captured. The mutiny ended and prisoners taken to Lucknow Prison, then returned to their native country. Nineteen mutineers were sentenced to death, 59 were sentenced to life imprisonment and 10 were acquitted. All these sentences were commuted (except for Daly's), but those convicted were stripped of their pensions and remained in military prison until they were released in 1923. Some were in desperate financial straits until the passage by the Irish government of the Connaught Rangers (Pensions) B-5086 Act of 1936.

Two Irish mutineers, privates Patrick Smyth (or Smythe) and Peter Sears, were killed during the mutiny. Private John Miranda, an English mutineer and native of Liverpool, died later of enteric fever at Dagshai military prison.

Unlike other leading mutineers such as Hawes and William Coman – who played as large or even larger a role than Daly, at least at the outset, but whose sentences were commuted – James Daly was executed by firing squad for his leading role in the incident following a court-martial on 2 November 1920. He was the last member of the British Armed Forces to be executed for mutiny.

In 1970, on the 50th anniversary of the mutiny his body was sent back to Ireland. Joseph Hawes was present at Daly's commemoration.

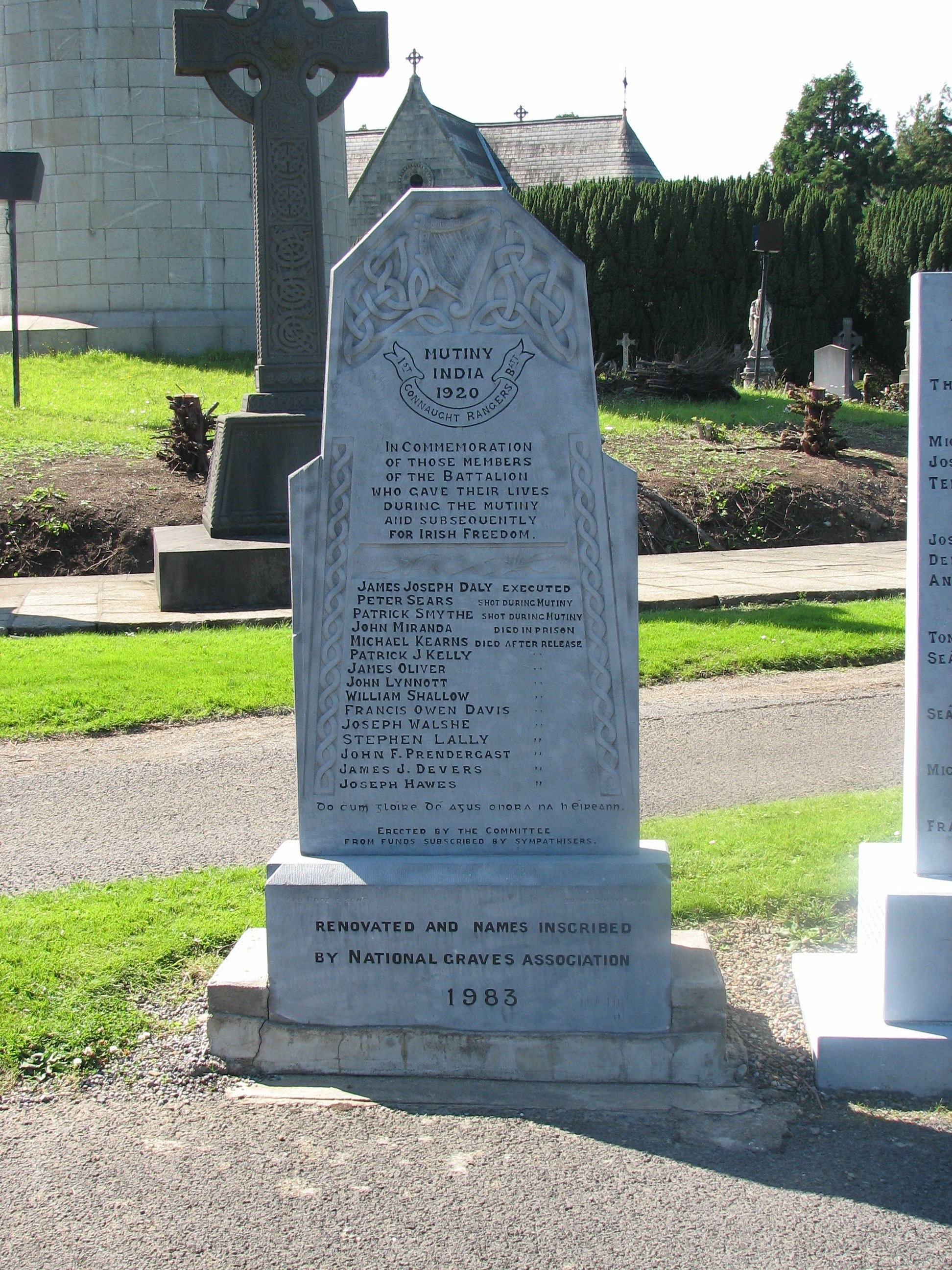
Memorial to the Connaught Rangers mutiny in Glasnevin Cemetery

== Legacy ==
Daly is remembered in a traditional Irish song known as Lay Him Away on the Hillside, the chorus of which includes the lines:

Lay him away on the hillside,
Along with the brave and the bold
Inscribe his name on the scroll of fame
In letters of purest gold
"My conscience shall never convict me"
He said with his last dying breath
"May God speed the causes of freedom ... For which I am sentenced to death."
