= Willie Millar =

Scottish footballer (1901–1966)

Personal information
- Full name: William Mills Millar
- Date of birth: 20 March 1901
- Place of birth: Carronshore, Scotland
- Date of death: 19 July 1966 (aged 65)
- Place of death: York, England
- Height: 5 ft 9 in (1.75 m)
- Position: Outside forward

Senior career*
Years	Team	Apps	(Gls)
- Dunipace Juniors
- Bo'ness
- → Hearts (trial)
1924–1925	Ayr United	39	(4)
1925–1927	Rhyl Athletic		
1927–1929	Middlesbrough	16	(6)
1929–1931	York City	58	(12)
1931	Glentoran		
1931–	Crewe Alexandra	0	(0)
- Drumcondra
1934–????	York Wednesday		
Total		113+	(22+)
- * Club domestic league appearances and goals

William Mills Millar (20 March 1901 – 19 July 1966) was a Scottish professional footballer who played as an outside forward in Scottish football for Dunipace Juniors, Bo'ness, Hearts and Ayr United, in the Football League for Middlesbrough and York City, in non-League football for Rhyl Athletic and York Wednesday, in Irish football for Glentoran and Drumcondra and was on the books of Crewe Alexandra without making a league appearance.
