= John Beattie (footballer) =

Scottish footballer

Jack Beattie
Personal information
- Full name: John Murdoch Beattie
- Date of birth: 28 May 1912
- Place of birth: Newhills, Aberdeen, Scotland
- Date of death: 15 January 1992 (aged 79)
- Place of death: Wolverhampton, England
- Height: 5 ft 9 in (1.75 m)
- Position: Inside forward

Youth career
- Hall Russell's FC

Senior career*
Years	Team	Apps	(Gls)
1931–1933	Aberdeen	60	(12)
1933–1934	Wolverhampton Wanderers	44	(13)
1934–1937	Blackburn Rovers	76	(17)
1937–1938	Birmingham	36	(10)
1938	Huddersfield Town	3	(0)
1938–1939	Grimsby Town	59	(13)
Total		278	(65)
- * Club domestic league appearances and goals

John Murdoch Beattie (28 May 1912 – 15 January 1992), generally known as Jack Beattie, was a Scottish professional association footballer who played as an inside forward. He played in the Scottish League for Aberdeen, and made more than 200 appearances in the English Football League representing Wolverhampton Wanderers, Blackburn Rovers, Birmingham, Huddersfield Town and Grimsby Town before his career was brought to an end by the Second World War. He was born in Newhills, Aberdeen, Scotland, and died in Wolverhampton, Staffordshire, England at the age of 79.
