= Joe O'Reilly (footballer) =

Irish footballer

Joseph O'Reilly
Personal information
- Date of birth: 27 May 1911
- Place of birth: Dublin
- Date of death: September 1992 (aged 81)

Senior career*
Years	Team	Apps	(Gls)
1929–1932	Brideville		
1932–1935	Aberdeen	39	(0)
1935–1936	Brideville		
1936–1944	St James's Gate		
1944–1945	Brideville		

International career
1932–1939	Ireland (FAI)	20	(2)
- * Club domestic league appearances and goals

Joseph O'Reilly was an Irish international soccer player.

O'Reilly was a half back and was capped 20 times for the Republic of Ireland at senior level. He made his debut against the Netherlands in a 2–0 victory in May 1932. O'Reilly opened the scoring in the game, while Paddy Moore scored the second. His final international game was in Bremen in 1939 in a 1–1 draw with Germany only months before the outbreak of World War II.

O'Reilly, together with Paddy Moore and Jimmy Daly, was one of three Irish players who were signed by Aberdeen in the 1930s after their displays with the Ireland national team for a combined fee of £1,000.

His brother Peter O'Reilly was a successful Gaelic football player who won an All-Ireland for Dublin in 1942.

== Honours ==
=== Club ===
St James Gate

- League of Ireland: 1939–40
- FAI Cup: 1937–38
