= Jimmy Stenhouse =

Scottish footballer (born 1919)

Personal information
- Full name: James Stenhouse
- Date of birth: 14 August 1919
- Place of birth: Kelty, Scotland
- Height: 5 ft 7 in (1.70 m)
- Positions: Right half; inside right

Senior career*
Years	Team	Apps	(Gls)
–	Lochgelly Violet		
1941–1948	St Mirren	25	(2)
1948–1951	Aberdeen	31	(1)
1951–1952	Kettering Town		
1952–1953	Ross County		
1953–1955	Ayr United	0	(0)
1955–1956	Corby Town		
1956–1958	Stamford		

International career
1944	Scotland (wartime)	1	(0)

Managerial career
- 1952–1953: Ross County (player-manager)
- * Club domestic league appearances and goals

James Stenhouse (born 14 August 1919, date of death unknown) was a Scottish professional footballer who played as a right half or inside right.

In a career interrupted by World War II, his clubs included St Mirren and Aberdeen. He had been a Scotland schoolboy international in 1935, and while with St Mirren (where he won the wartime Summer Cup in 1943) he was selected in an unofficial international fixture against England at Wembley in 1944. Stenhouse is deceased.
