= George Scott (footballer, born 1904) =

English footballer

Personal information
- Full name: John George Scott
- Date of birth: 14 August 1904
- Place of birth: Blackhill, County Durham, England
- Date of death: 1976 (aged 71–72)
- Position: Outside left

Senior career*
Years	Team	Apps	(Gls)
1926–1929	South Shields	67	(10)
1929–1930	Newcastle United	7	(2)
1930–1932	Gillingham	39	(7)
1932–1933	North Shields		
1933–1936	Wigan Athletic	120	(79)
- * Club domestic league appearances and goals

John George Scott (14 August 1904 – 1976) was an English professional footballer of the 1930s.

Born in Blackhill, he joined Gillingham from Newcastle United in 1930.

He went on to make 39 appearances for the club in The Football League, scoring seven goals. He then left to join North Shields in 1932.

He joined Wigan Athletic in 1933, where he scored 79 goals in 120 Cheshire League appearances for the club.
