= Jimmy Daly =

Irish footballer

Personal information
- Date of birth: 30 November 1904
- Position: Defender

Senior career*
Years	Team	Apps	(Gls)
1931–1932	Shamrock Rovers		
1932	Aberdeen	4	(0)
1932–1935	Shamrock Rovers		

International career
1932–1935	Irish Free State	2	(0)
- * Club domestic league appearances and goals

Jimmy Daly (born 30 November 1904, date of death unknown) was an Irish football player who played primarily as a right-back.

== Career ==
He joined Shamrock Rovers in 1931 and in his first season helped Rovers win the League, the FAI Cup and the Shield. On 21 May 1932 he departed for Aberdeen F.C. of the Scottish Division One. On August 17, 1932 Daly made his debut for the Dons in a 7-1 win over East Stirlingshire in the Dewar Shield at Pittodrie. He would ultimately make only four appearances for Aberdeen before being sold back to Shamrock Rovers on 8 December 1932.

He won two senior caps for the Irish Free State making his debut in a 2-0 friendly win against the Netherlands on 8 May 1932. His other cap came in a 1-0 friendly loss against Switzerland in Basle on 5 May 1935.

He scored twice in the 1933 FAI Cup replay win.

== Honours ==
- League of Ireland: 1
  - Shamrock Rovers - 1931–32
- FAI Cup: 2
  - Shamrock Rovers - 1932, 1933
- League of Ireland Shield: 1
  - Shamrock Rovers - 1931-32
- Leinster Senior Cup: 1
  - Shamrock Rovers - 1933
- LFA President's Cup: 1
  - Shamrock Rovers - 1933-34
