= Boylan =

Boylan is an Irish surname. It derives from Ó Baoighealláin, descendants of Baoigheallán. Notable people with the surname include:

- Andrew Boylan (disambiguation), multiple people, including:
  - Andrew Boylan (bishop) (1842–1910), Irish prelate of the Roman Catholic Church
  - Andrew Boylan (politician) (1939–2024), Irish Fine Gael politician
- Barbara Boylan (born 1942), American dancer and television personality
- Brett Boylan (born 1971), Australian Paralympic wheelchair rugby player
- Cathal Boylan (born 1964), Northern Irish politician
- Christine Boylan (born 1977), American television writer and producer
- Clare Boylan (1948–2006), Irish author, journalist and critic
- Dean Boylan (born 1951), American ice hockey defenseman
- Donal Boylan (fl. 2001), Irish Gaelic footballer and Australian rules footballer
- Eileen April Boylan (born 1987), American film and television actress
- Grace Duffie Boylan (1861–1935), American writer
- Ian Boylan (born 1983), American basketball player
- Jennifer Finney Boylan (born 1958), American author and transgender activist
- Jim Boylan (born 1955), American basketball coach
- John Boylan (disambiguation), multiple people, including:
  - John Boylan (American actor) (1912–1994), American film, television and stage actor
  - John Boylan (Canadian actor), Canadian film and television actor
  - John Boylan (record producer) (born 1941), American music producer and songwriter
  - John H. Boylan (1907–1981), Vermont politician
  - John J. Boylan (1878–1938), US Congressman
  - John Joseph Boylan (bishop) (1889–1953), third Roman Catholic Bishop of Rockford, Illinois
- Kieran Boylan, Irish drug dealer
- Krew Boylan (born c. 1982), Australian television actress
- Larry Boylan (1908–1997), American educator
- Laura Boylan (cricketer) (born 1991), Irish cricketer
- Lee Boylan (born 1978), English football striker
- Lydia Boylan (born 1987), Irish racing cyclist
- Lynn Boylan (born 1976), Irish politician and Member of the European Parliament
- Malcolm Stuart Boylan (1897–1967), American screenwriter, writer, and founder of the U.S. Coast Guard Auxiliary
- Michelle Boylan, Australian politician
- Patrick Boylan (1939–2024), professor of heritage policy, and international authority on museum policy and management
- Peter J. Boylan, U.S. Army Major General and college president
- Roger Boylan (born 1951), American writer
- Seán Boylan (born 1949), Gaelic football manager
- Steven A. Boylan (born 1965), U.S. military spokesman
- Terence Boylan, American singer/songwriter
- Terence Boylan (politician) (1910–1991), Irish Fianna Fáil politician and businessman
- William Boylan (1869–1940), American first President of Brooklyn College

== Fictional characters ==
- Blazes Boylan, fictional character in James Joyce's novel Ulysses
- Iola Boylan, fictional character on the television series Mama's Family

== See also ==
- Boylen, surname
- Boylan Act, 1914 New York state legislation
- Boylan Bottling Company, soft drink manufacturer in New York City
- Boylan Catholic High School, located in Rockford, Illinois
- Boylan Heights, neighborhood of Raleigh, North Carolina
