= Boylen =

Boylen is a surname. Notable people with the name include:

- Dave Boylen (born 1947), English football midfielder and politician
- Frank Boylen (1878–1938), English rugby player
- James Boylen (1907–1970), Canadian businessman and Thoroughbred racehorse owner
- Jim Boylen (born 1965), American basketball coach
- John Boylen (1898–1961), Scottish footballer
- Margaret Boylen (1921–1967), American novelist
- Robert Boylen (1901–1955), Australian politician

== See also ==
- Boylan, surname
- Nelson A. Boylen Collegiate Institute, located in Toronto
