= Irish clans =

Gaelic kinship groups

Irish clans are traditional kinship groups sharing a common surname and heritage and existing in a lineage-based society, originating prior to the 17th century. A clan (or fine in Irish, plural finte) included the chief and his patrilineal relatives; However, Irish clans also included unrelated clients of the chief. These unrelated clients and their agnatic descendants were ineligible to be elected chief, but nonetheless assumed the name of the leading lineage as a show of allegiance.

Beginning in the 8th century, various genealogical collections were compiled purporting to trace the ancestry of these clans. Among them are genealogies in Rawlinson B 502, the Book of Ballymote, the Book of Lecan, the Leabhar Mór na nGenealach compiled by Dubhaltach MacFhirbisigh, and the Ó Cléirigh Book of Genealogies. In all of these cases, the genealogies listed state the agnatic descent of the chiefs and chieftains, and not necessarily every member of the clan. At least one genetic study has concluded that while these genealogies appear fairly accurate back to the Middle Ages, they are unreliable before the 7th century.

== Definition of "clan" ==
The Irish word clann is a borrowing from the Latin planta, meaning 'a plant, an offshoot, offspring, a single child or children, by extension race or descendants'. For instance, the O'Daly family were poetically known as Clann Dalaigh, from a remote ancestor called Dalach.

Clann was used in the later Middle Ages to form a plural for surnames beginning with Mac, meaning 'son of'. For example, "Clann Cárthaigh" meant the men of the MacCarthy family and "Clann Suibhne" meant the men of the MacSweeny family. Clann was also used to denote a subgroup within a wider surname, the descendants of a recent common ancestor, such as the Clann Aodha Buidhe or the O'Neills of Clandeboy, whose ancestor was Aodh Buidhe who died in 1298. Such a "clan", if sufficiently closely related, could have common interests in landownership, but any political power wielded by their chief was territorially based.

From ancient times, Irish society was organised around traditional kinship groups or clans. These clans traced their origins to larger pre-surname population groupings or clans such as Uí Briúin in Connacht, Eóganachta and Dál gCais in Munster, Uí Néill in Ulster, and Fir Domnann in Leinster. Within these larger groupings, there tended to be one sept (division) who, through war and politics, became more powerful than others for a period of time, and the leaders of some were accorded the status of royalty in Gaelic Ireland. Some of the more important septs to achieve this power were O'Connor in Connacht, MacCarthy of Desmond, and O'Brien of Thomond in Munster, Ó Neill of Clandeboy in Ulster, and MacMorrough Kavanagh in Leinster.

The largely symbolic role of High king of Ireland tended to rotate among the leaders of these royal clans. The larger or more important clans were led by a taoiseach or chief who had the status of royalty, and the smaller and more dependent clans were led by chieftains. Under Brehon law, the leaders of Irish clans were appointed by their kinsmen as custodians of the clan and were responsible for maintaining and protecting their clan and its property. The clan system formed the basis of society up to the 17th century.

== Origins ==
=== The O'Rahilly doctrine ===
According to T. F. O'Rahilly, in his works Goides and Their Predecessors and later Early Irish History, there was a total of four waves of Celtic invasions of the British Isles, and the first three of these were pre-Gaelic. According to O'Rahilly, these were people who had largely remained unconquered by the Romans whose territory was mostly restricted to the broad plains of England. A larger part of England remained beyond the control of the West Germanic people who invaded after the imperial collapse of Roman Britain and who founded the English nation.

O'Rahilly's version of the origins of the Irish, as supported by C. Thomas Cairney and John Grenham, is as follows: The first of the Celtic invaders of Ireland were known as the Cruthin who arrived between 800 and 500 BC.

The second wave of Celts to come to Ireland was known as the Erainn, and this is supposedly where the Gaelic name for Ireland, Erin, originated. These people arrived between 500 and 100 BC. They came from the area which is today known as Belgium and had superior iron weaponry, and thus eventually reduced the Irish Cruthin to tributary status. The third wave of Celtic settlement in Ireland came from Continental Europe during the first century BC, probably due to Roman pressure in Southern Gaul. These people were known as the Dumnonii and gave their name to Devon in England. Their most powerful branch in Ireland was the Laigin, who gave their name to Leinster. A branch of the Irish group of the Dumnonii settled just to the south of Dumbarton in Scotland and were the ancestors of the Strathclyde-Britons.

The fourth and last major Celtic settlement in Ireland occurred around 50 BC. This was directly because of Roman attempts to dominate the Gauls of Continental Europe. This included, among others, a group known as the Feni who came to Ireland directly from the Continent and, according to tradition, landed in south Kerry and the Boyne estuary. The earlier inhabitants of the country fiercely resisted the newcomers, who were referred to as the Gaeil because they spoke the Gaelic language. The power and influence of the Gaeils gradually spread over the next three centuries, northwards, from Kerry into Tipperary and Limerick, as well as to the west into Galway and Roscommon. By the 5th century they were dominant in most of Ireland and had established dynasties and tribal groups. These groups shaped Irish politics and culture until the Norman invasion of Ireland, in the late 12th century.

=== Modern opinion ===
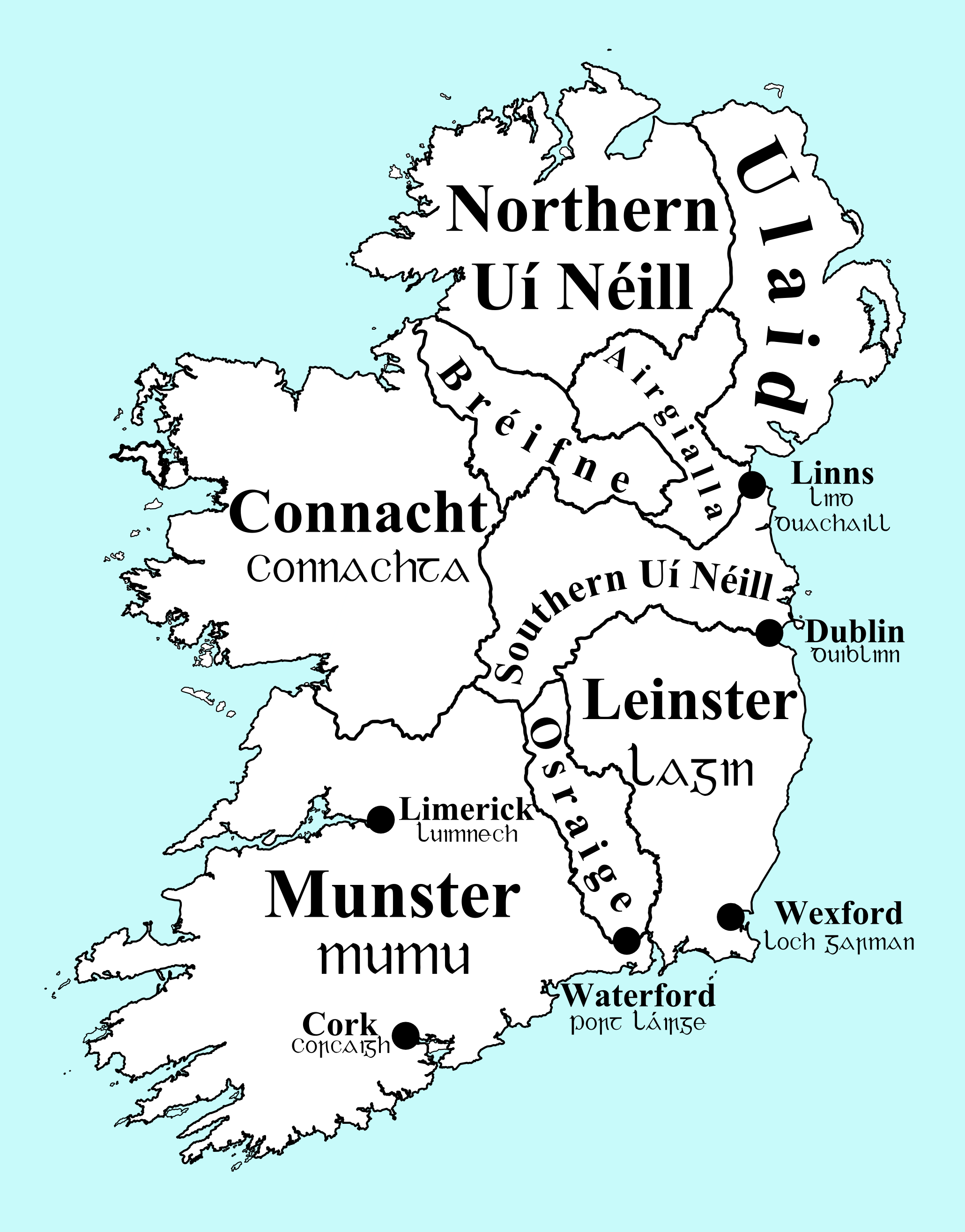
Map of Ireland AD 900, with major kingdoms and principal Viking towns

O'Rahilly's version of history has been questioned by archaeologists and historians who have played down the role of the Cruthin as invaders, including by Ian Adamson. O'Rahilly's history has been entirely unaccepted by some historians, including Francis John Byrne. According to Myles Dillon and Nora K. Chadwick, while O'Rahilly's version of history has been accepted by some scholars and dismissed by others, it is an entirely traditional history that he had sourced from Lebor Gabála Érenn which was a historic manuscript written in the 11th century, also known as the Book of the Invasions of Ireland, and not historic facts based on contemporary evidence. J. P. Mallory stated that O'Rahilly has argued that this manuscript showed that the medieval people of Ireland had seen a series of invasions from whom various dynasties and families might have traced their origins.

According to Mallory, Ireland may have been inhabited by Paleolithic (Old Stone Age) hunters, but the evidence for this is only a few pieces of flint. The first actual evidence of human residence in Ireland dates to around 8000 BC. Evidence of the first Neolithic farmers in Ireland dates to around 4000 BC. There is little evidence of a warrior elite in Ireland before 1500 BC, and evidence for this appears during the Bronze Age where everyone of a wealthy class had weaponry. The Irish language first appeared between 700/600 BC and 400 AD during the Iron Age. During this time, the Irish people came into contact with Roman traders.

According to the writers of Ulster: An Illustrated History, there is evidence for the Ulaid who are referred to as the Erainn by some genealogists which is also the name given on Ptolemy's map of Ireland which dates from the second century AD for the Iverni who lived in County Cork, as well as being the origin of the name for Ireland. The centre of the Ulaid's land was in the Diocese of Down. The main population group of the Ulaid was the Cruthin, whose territory was in the Diocese of Connor and Dromore. There is also evidence for the Loígis in Leinster and the Cíarraige in Munster, who also belong to this group, and it is possible that their ancestors in Ireland were pre-Celtic. It is also possible to identify from Ptolemy's map the Dál Riata of County Antrim who later founded a powerful kingdom in Argyll, Scotland. The 11th-century Lebor Gabála Érenn or Book of the Invasions of Ireland, describes a series of failed invasions of Ireland before settlement in the 8th century. However, by the 8th century, battles in Ireland were no longer between the natives and invaders but between tribes and dynasties for control of different parts of the island. Donnchadh Ó Corráin put the evidence for the Irish national identity back to the 7th century, emphasising the impact that Christianity had on the people there.

In 1002, the Uí Néill lost the high kingship of Ireland to the leader of the Dal gCais or Dalcassians, Brian Boru. It was during the century of declining Uí Néill dominance that surnames first began to be used in Ireland. This meant that Ireland was among the first countries in Europe to start using surnames. Descendants of Niall of the Nine Hostages, the ancestor of the Uí Néill dynasty, include people with the surnames O'Boyle, O'Connor, and O'Donnell. From the Dal gCais or Dalcassians came the surnames O'Brien and Kennedy.

== Social structure ==
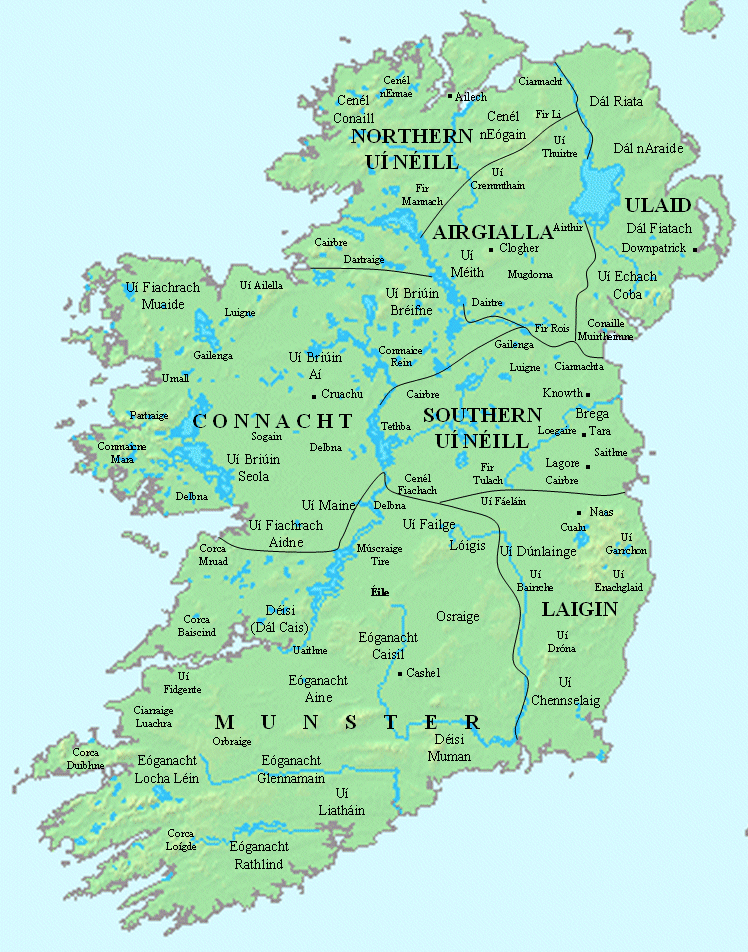
Map of Ireland with tribes and petty kingdoms, AD 800

Within the Gaeil there was a distinction between the tribes of the south and those of the north, and also from those of the west. The tribes in the south called themselves the Eoghanacht, and in about 400 AD, they established a dynasty at Cashel, which held power throughout most of southern Ireland from the 5th to 12th centuries. The Munster families of O'Sullivan, MacCarthy and O'Connell claim descent from the Eoghanacht.

In the midlands of Ireland, the Gaeil tribes were known as Connachta, and their name continues in the modern province of Connacht. The most important of the Connacta tribes was the Uí Néill, who claimed descent from Niall of the Nine Hostages. Niall's brothers included Ailill, Brion, and Fiachra, who were founders of the important Connachta tribes of Ui Ailella, Uí Briúin, and Uí Fiachrach.

Although the Eoghanacht and Uí Néill were the most powerful tribal groups in Ireland, there were others who were locally powerful including the Airgíalla in the north-east where they controlled what is now the counties of Tyrone, Armagh, Fermanagh and Monaghan. There was also the Ulaidh who inhabited what is now the counties of Down and Antrim.

Within these large areas, there were up to 150 small divisions known as túatha, and the names of many of these are reflected today in the names of the Irish baronies that make up the modern counties. Each túath had a ruler or petty king who owed allegiance to a more powerful king who was over-king of three or more túatha. This over-king would in turn be subordinate to the king of a province, usually either the Eoghanacht or Uí Néill.

The succession of kings or chiefs was governed by a system known as Tanistry whereby, after a chief died, the new chief would be elected from all agnatic cousins descended from a patrilineal grandfather or great-grandfather. However, according to Eoin MacNeill, the system known as tanistry which also took place before the position of king or chief had become vacant is not found in records until the time of feudalism in Ireland which was not until the time of the Normans, and it was preceded by the similar system known as Rigdomna but which took place only after the position of king or chief had become vacant. This theory however, was disputed by Gearóid Mac Niocaill who stated that there is no good evidence to support that the usage of the term Rigdomna in early medieval Ireland was any different to that of tanaise (Tanistry) in late medieval Ireland and that the two terms were synonymous with each other. Although Mac Niocaill stated that MacNeill was correct in identifying a number of cases where Rigdomna was limited to a four-generation group in early medieval Ireland, in late medieval Ireland, it was almost always the son, brother, or nephew of the king.

== Tribes of the Cruthin ==
As per O'Rahilly's doctrine, the Cruthin were the first Celts to settle in Ireland between about 800 and 500 BC. In line with this, according to Cairney, from them descended the following Irish tribes. Although it is not possible to prove O'Rahilly's history of the four Celtic invasions of Ireland or that the Cruthin were the first of these invasions, or that the following Irish tribes descended from them, according to historian Sean Duffy, the existence of all three of the following Irish tribes in around the 7th century is supported by the literature of the time that came to Ireland with Christianity.

- The Dal nAraide. Irish surnames that came from this tribe include: O'Lynch, MacGenises, and MacCartan. The latter two later became tributaries of the O'Neills.
- The Soghain. Their chief was in later times known as O'Mannin, or Mannions, and this has sometimes become Manning.
- The Loígis. Irish surnames which came from this tribe include: O'Mores, O'Nolans, O'Dorans, O'Lawlors and O'Dowlings.

== Tribes of the Erainn ==
As per O'Rahilly's doctrine, the Erainn were the second wave of Celts to settle in Ireland between about 500 and 100 BC. In line with this, according to Cairney, from them descended the following Irish tribes. Although it is not possible to prove O'Rahilly's history of the four Celtic invasions of Ireland or that the Erainn were the second of these invasions, or that the following Irish tribes descended from them, according to historian Sean Duffy, with the exception of the Clann Choinleagain, the existence of all of the following Irish tribes in around the 7th century is supported by the literature of the time that came to Ireland with Christianity.

- The Clann Choinleagain (or MacGifoyles). This was an ancient clan located in the territory of the O'Carrols of Ely.
- The Conmaicne Rein. The chiefly families of this tribe were the MacRannalls, O'Cornyns, O'Farrells, O'Moledys and O'Quins.
- The Corca Dhuibhne. The chiefly families of this tribe were the O'Connells and O'Sheas.
- The Corca Laoghdne. The chiefly families of this tribe were the O'Coffey, O'Dinneen, O'Driscoll, O'Flynn, O'Hea, O'Hennessy and O'Leary.
- The Corco Modhruadh. The chiefly families of this tribe were the O'Connors of Corcomroe, MacCurtins, O'Loghlens or O'Loughlins, O'Davorens and the Corca Thine.
- The Dal Cairbre Arad. The chiefly family of this tribe was the O'Dwyers.
- The Dal gCais (Dalcassians). The chiefly families of this tribe were the O'Brien dynasty who were the main chiefs, but also the MacConsidines, MacDonnells, MacLysaghts, MacMahons, O'Ahernes, O'Kennedys, O'Shanahans, O'Duracks, MacGraths, O'Fogartys, O'Galvins, O'Gradys, O'Hanrahans, O'Hickeys, O'Mearas, O'Molonys, O'Moroneys, O'Hartagans, O'Lonergans, Creaghs, O'Quins, MacNamaras, MacInerneys, O'Deas and O'Griffeys.
- The Déisi. Their chief was O'Phelan.
- The Partraige. Their chiefly family was the O'Malleys.
- The Uaithni. Their chiefly family was the O'Heffermans.
- The Uí Bairrche. Their chiefly families were the O'Tracys and MacGormans.
- The Ui Fidgenti. Their chiefly families were the O'Cullanes, O'Kinneallys, O'Donovans and MacEnerys.
- The Ulaid. Their chiefly family was the MacDonlevys.

== Tribes of the Dumnonii or Laigin ==
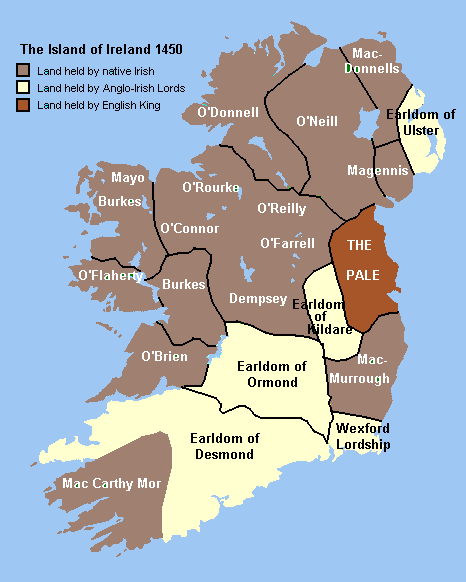
Ireland in 1450 showing lands held by native Irish clans (green), the Anglo-Irish (blue) and the English king (dark grey)

As per O'Rahilly's doctrine, the Dumnonii or Laigin were the third wave of Celts to settle in Ireland during the first century BC. In line with this, according to Cairney, from them descended the following Irish tribes. Although it is not possible to prove O'Rahilly's history of the four Celtic invasions of Ireland or that the Dumnonii or Laigin were the third of these invasions, or that the following Irish tribes descended from them, according to historian Sean Duffy, with the exception of the Ciarraighe Loch na nAirne and the Feara Cualann, the existence of all of the following Irish tribes in around the 7th century is supported by the literature of the time that came to Ireland with Christianity.

- The Cianacht. Their chiefly families were the O'Connors of Keenaght and the "race of Luighne" or "Lugh" which in turn included the chiefly families of O'Hara and O'Gara.
- The Dealbhna Eathra and Delbhna Nuadat. Their chiefly families were the O'Hanlys, MaCoghlans and O'Conrahys.
- The Saithne. Their chiefly family was the O'Caseys.
- The Ciarraighe Loch na nAirne. Their chiefly family was the O'Kierans.
- The Ciarraighe Luachra. Their chief family was the O'Connors of Kerry.
- The Eile. Their chiefly families were the O'Carrols of Ely, O'Mahers, O'Riordans, and O'Flanagans.
- The Ui Failghe. Their chiefly families were the O'Connors of Offaly, O'Mooneys, MacColgans, O'Hennesseys, O'Holohans, O'Dempseys, and O'Dunnes.
- The Feara Cualann. Their chiefly families were the O'Cullens and O'Mulryans.
- The Ui Ceinnsealaigh. Their chiefly families were the Kavanaghs, Kinsellas, O'Murphys, and O'Morchoes.
- The Uí Dúnlainge. Their chiefly families were the O'Byrnes and O'Tooles.
- The Ui Maine. Their chiefs were the O'Kellys but also included the Ó Comáin O'Fahys, O'Horans, O'Sheehans, O'Donnellans, O'Maddens, O'Concannons, O'Mullens, O'Malleys, O'Naghtens, and O'Houlihans.
- The Oirghialla (Airgíalla or Oriel). Their chiefly families were the MacBradys, O'Boylans, O'Flanagans, O'Mulroonys or Moroneys, Maguires, MacKerans, MacAuleys, O'Cassidys, O'Corrigans, MacManuses, MacMahons, MacCanns, O'Hanraghtys, O'Hanlons, O'Lynns, MacEvoys, MacDonalds, MacDonells, MacAlisters, MacIans, MacSheeys, MacIntyres, MacDougals, and Conns. (Note: Although manuscript genealogies, including the Book of Ballymote and Great Book of Lecan, show that the Scottish clans of MacDonald, MacAlister and MacDougall were paternally descended from Colla Uais who was one of The Three Collas who founded Oirghialla (Airgíalla) in Ireland, a Y-DNA study has shown that they might have been paternally descended from Norsemen.)

== Tribes of the Gaels or Gaeils ==
According to O'Rahilly's doctrine, the Gaels or Gaeils were the fourth and final wave of Celtic settlement in Ireland, which took place during the first century BC. In line with this, according to Cairney, from them descended the following Irish tribes. Although it is not possible to prove O'Rahilly's history of the four Celtic invasions of Ireland or that the Gaels or Gaeils were the fourth of these invasions, or that the following Irish tribes descended from them, according to historian Sean Duffy, with the exception of the Clann Cholmáin, Cineal Laoghaire and the Muintear Tadhagain, the existence of all of the following Irish tribes in around the 7th century is supported by the literature of the time that came to Ireland with Christianity.

=== The North Gaels ===
- The Connachta.
  - The Uí Briúin. Their chiefly family was in Gaelic the Síol Muireadaigh which anglicized is Silmurray and which included a number of important families including the O'Connors (O Connor Donn and O'Connor Sligo), the O'Malones, the O'Mulconrys, MacShanlys, MacGoverns, MacClancys, O'Rourkes, O'Reillys, O'Beirnes, O'Sheridans, O'Carrys, O'Flanagans, O'Crowleys, MacDermots, MacDonaghs, O'Mulvihills, MacGeraghtys, and O'Flahertys. (Note: The medieval genealogies, including Leabhar na nGenealach ("Book of Genealogies") and the Annals of the Four Masters, record three main branches of the Uí Briúin: the Uí Briúin Bréifne, the Uí Briúin Seóla, and the Uí Briúin Aí. A Y-DNA study of men with the surnames believed to have sprung from these branches suggests that the medieval genealogies are mostly accurate in regards to the genealogies of the Uí Briúin Bréifne and the Uí Briúin Seóla, and the surnames that came from them, but that there were notable inconsistencies with the medieval genealogies of the Uí Briúin Aí and the Y-DNA, and the surnames which are alleged to have sprung from it, although some parts of the Uí Briúin Aí medieval genealogies have shown to be consistent with the Y-DNA.)
  - The Uí Fiachrach.
    - The Uí Fiachrach Muaidhe (northern). Their main chiefs were the O'Dowds, but other chiefly families included the O'Finnegans, O'Keeves, O'Bolans, O'Kearneys, and O'Quigleys.
    - The Uí Fiachrach Aidhne (southern). Their main chiefs were the O'Shaughnessys, but other chiefly families were the O'Heynes, O'Heyne, or Hynes, O'Clerys, O'Donnells, O'Houlihans which in some places became Holland and Nolan, and also the O'Scanlans.
- The Uí Néill.
  - Northern Uí Néill.
    - Cineál Eoghain. The chiefly family was the O'Neill dynasty, but also included the MacLoughlins, O'Branigans, O'Rahillys of Kerry, MacMartins of Tyrone, O'Cahans, (Note: The chiefs of the Scottish clan of Munro or Monro are traditionally descended from the O'Cahans of the Cineál Eoghain in Ireland. However, a Y-DNA study has shown that the Munro chiefs were paternally distantly related to the O'Driscolls of Cork. Another Y-DNA study has shown that people with the surnames associated with the O'Cahains or O'Cathains of Ulster, some concentrated in County Londonderry and Dungiven where the clan was centred, match with the historical records as descendants of the O'Cathains of Ulster.) MacLachlans, Lamonts, MacSorleys, MacNeills, MacEwens, MacQueens, MacSweens, (Note: The MacLachlans, Lamonts, MacSorleys, MacNeills, MacEwens, MacQueens, MacSweens are all Scottish clans who are believed to be descended from the Cineál Eoghain in Ireland.) MacSweeneys of Ireland, O'Creans, Creans, Crehans, Creghans, O'Donnellys, O'Hegartys, O'Gormleys, O'Hagans, and O'Beolans. (Note: The chiefs of the Scottish clan of Ross are believed to be descended from the O'Beolans of the Cineál Eoghain in Ireland.)
    - Cineal Chonaill. Their main chiefs were the O'Donnell dynasty of Tyrconnell (Tír Chonaill), but also included the O'Canannains or O'Canons, O'Muldonys, O'Mulderrys, O'Friels, O'Boyles, O'Cullinans, and O'Dohertys.
    - Cineal Cairbre. Their main chiefs were the O'Brolans.
  - Southern Uí Néill.
    - Clann Cholmáin. Their main chiefs were the O'Melaghlins who were later known as the MacLoughlins of Meath.
    - Cineal Fiachach. Their main chiefs were the MacGeoghegans or O'Molloys.
    - Cineal Laoghaire. Their main chiefs were the O'Quinlans.
    - Fir Teathbha. Their main chiefs were the O'Caharneys, O'Dallys, MacAwleys, MacCarons, O'Brennas, and O'Shiels.
    - Muintear Tadhagain. Their chiefs were the O'Caharneys or O'Kearneys, also known as the Foxes (Sionnach).
    - The Four Tribes of Tara: O'Harts, O'Regans, Mackennas, O'Higgins.

=== The South Gaels ===
- The Eoghanacht. The chiefly family was the MacCarthy dynasty, but other families included the O'Meehans, O'Keeffes, O'Sullivans and McGillycuddys.
- The Ui Eachach Mumhan. Their main chiefs were the O'Callaghans, O'Donoghues, and O'Mahonys.

== Vikings and Normans in Ireland ==
Ireland c. 1100 before the Norman invasion showing dynasties and tribes

Vikings and Normans are ethnically populations, linked in ancestry. From the 9th to 11th centuries, the Vikings raided and settled in Britain and Ireland. In Ireland, the Vikings became completely Gaelicized and established the first towns. The Normans invaded and conquered England in 1066 and later had similar success invading Ireland in the late 12th century. The Normans were the first people to introduce the mounted knight. In Ireland, these "Old English" families were influenced just as much as they themselves influenced and have been described as having become "more Irish than the Irish themselves".

=== Viking families in Ireland ===
At least the following three Irish families are believed to be of Viking descent: the Clan Fearghaill whose chiefs were the O'Hallorans, the MacCotters, and the O'Doyles. (Note: The chiefs of the Scottish clans of Gunn, MacLeod, MacCorquodale, and Ruthven are also believed to be descended from Viking settlers.)

=== Norman families in Ireland ===
The following surnames found in Ireland are believed to be of Norman origin and to have arrived following the Norman invasion of Ireland: Barry, Branne, Burke, Butler, Condon, Cusak, Dalton, Darcy, de Covcy, Dillon, Fagun, Fitzgerald, MacGibbon, French, Hackett, Jordan, Keating, Lacy, Lynch, MacCostello, Martin, Nugent, Power, Purcell, Rothes, Sarsfield, Wall.

The following surnames are believed to have come to Ireland with the Norman invasion but are believed to have been of Flemish origin: Tobin, Flemming, Prendergast.

The following surnames are believed to have come to Ireland with the Norman invasion but are believed to have been of Welsh origin: Roche, Blake, Joyce, MacQuillan, Rice, Taffe, Walsh, Savage.

== End of the clan system ==
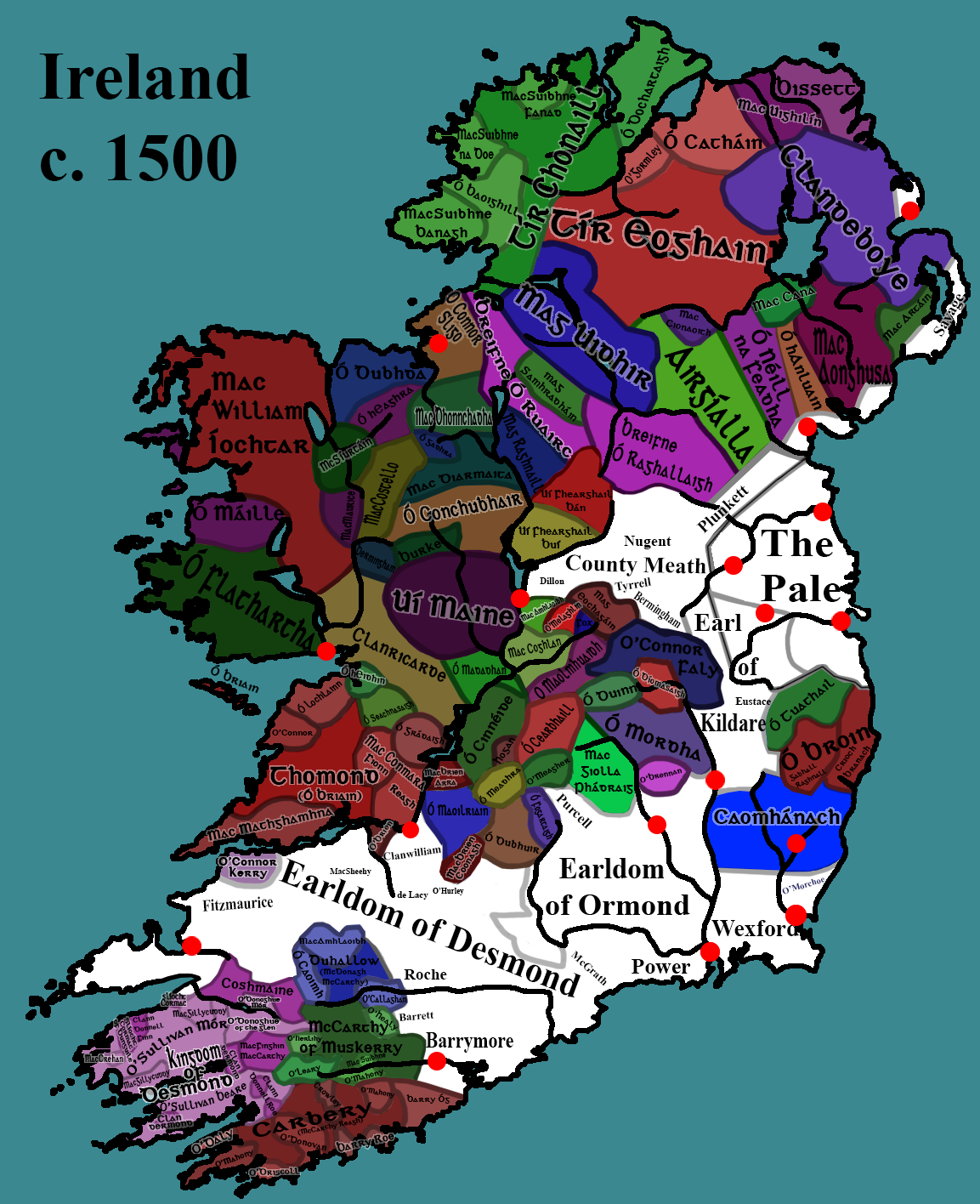
Ireland c. 1500 at the beginning of the Tudor period

In the 16th century, English common law was introduced throughout Ireland, along with a centralised royal administration in which the county and the sheriff replaced the "country" and the clan chief.

When the Kingdom of Ireland was created in 1541, the Dublin administration wanted to involve the Gaelic chiefs in the new entity, creating new titles for them such as the Baron Upper Ossory, Earl of Tyrone, and Baron Inchiquin. In the process, they were granted new coats of arms in 1552. The associated policy of surrender and regrant involved a change to succession to a title by the European system of primogeniture, and not by the Irish tanistry, where a group of male cousins of a chief was eligible to succeed by election.

The early 17th century was a watershed in Ireland. It marked the destruction of Ireland's ancient Gaelic aristocracy following the Tudor re-conquest and cleared the way for the Plantation of Ulster. In 1607, the senior Gaelic chiefs of Ulster left Ireland to recruit support in Spain but failed, and instead eventually arrived in Rome, where they remained for the rest of their lives. After this point, the English authorities in Dublin established real control over all of Ireland for the first time, bringing a centralised government to the entire island, and successfully disarming the native clans and their lordships.

== Later developments ==
Clans of Ireland, a limited company and independent charity, was established in 1989 to provide modern Irish clan organisations with "guidance in establishing and maintaining a successful Clan society".

== See also ==
- List of Irish clans in Ulster
- Scottish clan
- List of Scottish clans
- List of ancient Celtic peoples and tribes
- Celtic peoples

== Bibliography ==
- Bhreathnach, Edel (2014). Ireland in the medieval world, AD 400–1000: Landscape, kingship and religion. Four Courts Press. ISBN 978-1846823428.
- Cairney, C. Thomas (1989). Clans and Families of Ireland and Scotland. Jefferson, North Carolina, United States, and London: McFarland & Company. ISBN 0899503624.
- Connolly, S. J., ed. (2007). Oxford Companion to Irish History. Oxford University Press. ISBN 978-0-19-923483-7.
- Curley, W. J. P. (2004). Vanishing Kingdoms: The Irish Chiefs and their Families. Dublin: Lilliput Press.
- Duffy, Sean, ed. (2011). Atlas of Irish History (3rd ed.). Dublin: Gill and Macmillan Publishers. ISBN 9780717148905.
- Duggan, Catherine (2013). "14: End of the Brehon Era". The Lost Laws of Ireland. Dublin: Glasnevin Publishing. ISBN 9781908689214.
- Fisher, Joseph (1877). The History of Land Holding in Ireland. London: Longmans Green. pp. 11-16.
- Mac Fhirbhisigh, Dubhaltach (2004) [Written from original manuscript Leabhar na nGenealach which was written 1649-1650]. Ó Muraíle, Nollaig (ed.). The Great Book of Irish Genealogies. Dublin: De Burca Books. ISBN 0946130361.
- Mallory, J. P. (2017). The Origins of The Irish. London: Thames & Hudson. ISBN 9780500293300.
- Moncreiffe, Iain (1982). The Highland Clans. New York: Clarkson N. Potter. pp. 127–131. ISBN 0517546590.
- Nicholls, K (2003). Gaelic and Gaelicized Ireland in the Middle Ages (2nd ed.). Dublin: Lilliput Press.
- O'Hart, John (1892). Irish Pedigrees; or, The Origin and Stem of The Irish Nation. Vol. 1 (5th ed.). Dublin; London; Glasgow; New York City: James Duffy, Burns & Oates, Hugh Margey, Benziger Brothers.
