= Cornyn =

Cornyn is a surname in English-language countries; it is from Ireland originally, and is the equivalent of Curneen. According to historian C. Thomas Cairney, the O'Cornyns were part of the Conmaicne Rein tribe in Ireland who came from the Erainn tribe, the second wave of Celts to settle in Ireland from about 500 and 100 BC.

== Notable people sharing the surname Cornyn ==
- Alison Cornyn, American interdisciplinary artist
- John Cornyn (born 1952), United States Senator for Texas
- Stan Cornyn (born 1933), American record label executive
- William Cornyn (1906–1971), Canadian-born American linguist

== See also ==
- Irish clans
