= Holohan =

Holohan (Irish: Ó hUallacháin; feminine Ní Uallacháin) is a surname of Irish Gaelic origin, from the Irish uallach meaning "proud".

A version of the family crest depicts two white lions holding up a golden tower.

According to historian C. Thomas Cairney, the O'Holohans were one of the chiefly families of the Ui Failghe who in turn were a tribe from the Dumnonii or Laigin who were the third wave of Celts to settle in Ireland during the first century BC.

Notable people with the surname include:

- Frank Holohan (born 1957), Irish hurler
- John Holohan (hurler) (1891–1947), Irish hurler
- Lenny Holohan (born 1985), Irish camogie player
- Owen Holohan, Irish hurler
- Patrick Holohan (born 1988), Irish mixed martial artist
- Pete Holohan (born 1959), American football player
- Richard Holohan (1882–1954), Irish politician
- Tony Holohan, Irish public health physician

== See also ==
- Houlihan, an alternative spelling
- Wes Hoolahan, footballer
- O'Houlihan (dynasty)
- Irish clans
