= O'Boyle =

O'Boyle is a surname of Irish origin. It is anglicised from the Gaelic Ó Baoighill/Ó Baoill.

The O'Boyle family were a clan of the Northern Uí Néill, supposedly descended from the legendary Irish king Niall of the Nine Hostages down to a Donegal chieftain, Aneisleis Ó Baoighill. The derivation of the Gaelic/Irish is uncertain, and has been translated as "Peril" or "Danger", "son of the rash one" or more positively "having profitable pledges" (from the Irish word geall, meaning "pledge"). Their chiefs came to rule over Tír Ainmhireach in the west of what is now County Donegal, which as a result became known as Críoch Bhaoigheallach; later renamed as the barony of Boylagh under colonial rule.

Notable people with the surname include:

- Bill O'Boyle (born 1963), American college football coach and former player
- Ciarán O'Boyle (born 1984), Irish former rugby union footballer
- Conor O'Boyle (fl. 1970–2015), retired lieutenant general and Irish Defence Forces Chief of Staff
- Cornelius O'Boyle (c. 1547– 1591), Irish Catholic prelate and Bishop of Limerick
- Dan O'Boyle (died 1933), Catholic Irish publican murdered by Protestant loyalists
- George O'Boyle (born 1967), Northern Irish footballer
- Harry O'Boyle (1904–1994), American National Football League player
- Ian O'Boyle (born 1984), Irish former basketball player
- John O'Boyle (1928–1984), American basketball player
- Maeve O'Boyle (born 1987), Scottish singer and songwriter
- Maureen O'Boyle (born 1963), American television show host and news anchor
- Michael O'Boyle, Scottish computer scientist
- Neal O'Boyle (died 1912), Irish revolutionary, president of the Irish Republican Brotherhood
- Patrick O'Boyle (cardinal) (1896–1987), American Catholic archbishop and cardinal
- Patrick O'Boyle (Irish bishop) (1887–1971), Irish Catholic Bishop of Killala
- Sean O'Boyle (born 1963), Australian composer and conductor
- Shaun O'Boyle, Irish science communicator, podcast producer and activist
- Tommy O'Boyle (1917–2000), American college football player, coach and athletics administrator and National Football League assistant coach

Fictional characters include:

- Patrick O'Boyle, in the American sitcom The King of Queens

== See also ==
- Boyle (surname), a Scottish surname
- Clan Boyle, a Scottish clan
