= Houlihan =

Houlihan or O'Houlihan (Irish: Ó hUallacháin; feminine Ní Uallacháin) is a surname of Irish Gaelic origin, from the Irish uallach meaning "proud". Notable people with the surname include:

- Adam Houlihan (born 1978), former Australian rules footballer
- Christopher Houlihan (born 1987), American concert organist
- Con Houlihan (1925–2012), Irish sportswriter
- Damian Houlihan (born 1975), former Australian rules footballer
- Gerard Houlihan, Irish retired Gaelic footballer
- Jim Houlihan (1898–1967), Irish sportsperson
- Joan Houlihan, American poet
- John C. Houlihan (1910–1986), American politician, the 43rd mayor of Oakland, California
- John J. Houlihan (1923–2003), American politician, Illinois state representative
- Mike Houlihan (born 1969), retired Irish sportsperson
- Pat Houlihan (1929–2006), English snooker player
- Patrick Houlihan (1889–1963), Irish politician
- Ryan Houlihan (born 1982), Australian rules footballer
- Shelby Houlihan (born 1993), American middle-distance runner
- Tim Houlihan (born 1989), Australian rules footballer
- Timmy Houlihan (born 1982), Irish sportsperson

== See also ==
- Houlihan's, an American restaurant and bar chain
- Houlihan Lokey, independent, advisory-focused, global investment bank
- Houlihan Stadium or Tampa Stadium, a sports venue in Tampa, Florida
- Houlihan Smith & Company, investment banking firm
- Jim Houlihan Park at Jack Coffey Field, a baseball venue on the Rose Hill campus of Fordham University in Bronx, New York
- Cathleen ni Houlihan, a one-act play by Irish playwright William Butler Yeats
- Kathleen Ni Houlihan, a mythical symbol and emblem of Irish nationalism found in literature and art
- Margaret "Hot Lips" Houlihan, a fictional character in the M*A*S*H franchise
- In cattle roping the houlihan is a one-swing flip shot at a calf traveling in front of you from left to right
- Holohan, an alternative spelling
- Hooligan
- Houlahan
- Wes Hoolahan
- O'Houlihan (dynasty)
