= Houlahan =

Houlahan is a surname. Notable people with the surname include:

- Chrissy Houlahan (born 1967), American politician, engineer, and entrepreneur
- Ger Houlahan, Irish Gaelic footballer
- Harry Houlahan (born 1930), English footballer

== See also ==
- 8407 Houlahan, a main-belt asteroid
- Houlihan
