= O'Boylan =

Irish clan from Dartraighe

The O'Boylan (Irish: Ó Baíolláin, traditionally Ó Baoighealláin) or O'Boyland is an Irish clan from Dartraighe.

According to historian C. Thomas Cairney, the O'Boylans were a chiefly family of the Oirghialla (or Airgíalla or Oriel) who were a tribe of the Laigin, the third wave of Celts to settle in Ireland during the first century BC.

== See also ==
- Irish clans
- Boylan
