= John Boylan =

John Boylan may refer to:

- John Boylan (American actor) (1912–1994), American film, television and stage actor
- John Boylan (Canadian actor), Canadian film and television actor
- John Boylan (record producer) (born 1941), American music producer and songwriter
- John H. Boylan (1907–1981), Vermont politician
- John J. Boylan (1878–1938), U.S. Congressman
- John Joseph Boylan (bishop) (1889–1953), third Roman Catholic Bishop of Rockford, Illinois

== See also ==
- John Boylen (1898–1961), Scottish footballer
