= Laisrén mac Nad Froích =

Early Irish monastic saint

Laisrén mac Nad Froích (died 564), or Laisrén of Devenish and Lasserian, known as Mo Laisse, was the patron saint of Devenish Island in Lough Erne, near Enniskillen, County Fermanagh, Ireland, in the present diocese of Clogher. Laisrén is the subject of both a Latin and an Irish Life, which offer loose narratives in which a number of miscellaneous anecdotes and miracles have been grouped together.

== Background on Laisrén and Devenish ==
Laisrén is chiefly known as the founder of a monastery at Devenish, Irish Daim-inis (lit. 'Ox-island'), which was also home to his cult soon after his death.

The Lives make clear that the area of Devenish was ruled by the Síl nDaiméni branch of the Uí Chremthainn. To the Irish life is appended a tale of the exile of the Dartraige or Dartrige, presumably because in the 9th century, political control over Devenish and the rest of the region known as Fernmag had changed hands from the Uí Nad Sluaig (a branch of the Uí Chremthann) to the Dartraige.

According to the Irish genealogies of saints, Laisrén belonged to the Uí Chóelbad, who were based in Mag Line (Co Antrim) and formed the leading branch of the Cruithni. The Irish Life makes him a member of the Éoganachta of Munster and likewise, borrows a birth tale from an Éoganacht origin legend, but this appears to be an innovation intended to link Laisrén with the new rulers based on the idea that the Dartraige were a people exiled from Munster.

== Career ==
The Latin and Irish Lives are the main sources for historical and legendary details of Laisrén's career. One story which links him to famous contemporaries claims that he studied the Gospels under the mentorship of Finnián of Clonard (d. 549/51).

Among the more action-packed anecdotes, there is one which relates how Laisrén ran into conflict with a local pagan king, Conall Derg (father of Énna of Aran), who is identified as the king of the Síl nDaiméni in the Irish Life. Utilizing his miraculous powers, Laisrén is said to have subdued the king, who ceded the island to Laisrén. The last significant events narrated in his Lives include a pilgrimage to Rome.

One of his stopping places was at Ferns, where he visited his foster brother Máedóc and promised him to do good on his behalf. After his visit to Rome, he is said to have returned to Devenish with relics of Peter and Paul, Laurence and Clement, which were buried with him in the cemetery, so that Devenish could become an Irish Rome.

== Death and veneration ==
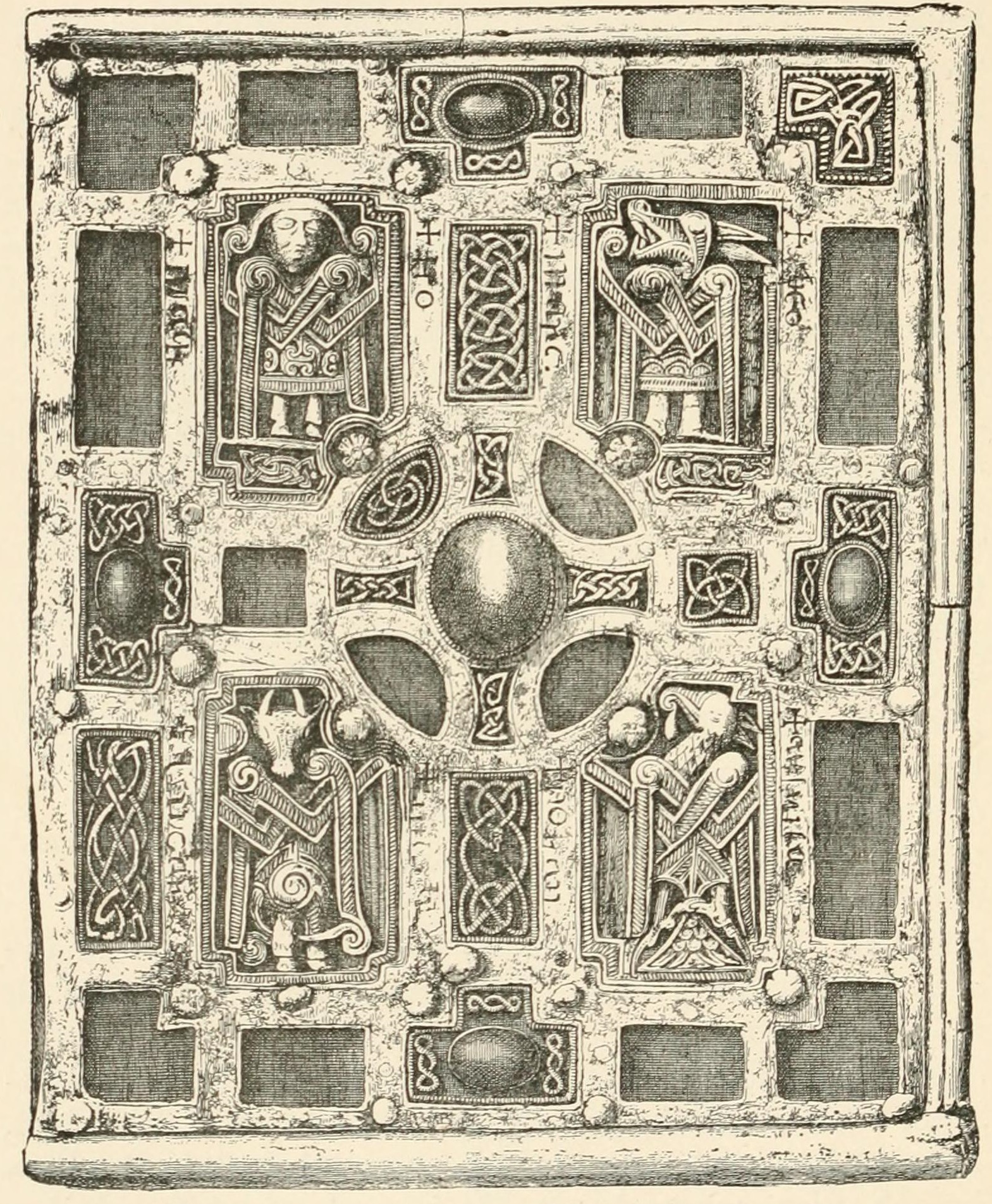
Case of Molaise's Gospels; the Soiscél Molaisse

The Irish annals record his death in 564. According to early Irish martyrologies, his festival was observed on 12 September. Note that while Laisrén is traditionally considered a saint, he is not listed in the latest official, complete martyrology of the Catholic Church, the 2004 Martyrologium Romanum in Latin. He is venerated as a pre-1054 Great East-West Schism Western saint in the Orthodox Church as all saints traditionally venerated by the united Church are, even if subsequently downgraded or rejected by Rome since the Schism.

A piece of metalwork which bears testimony to his cult is the book reliquary, probably from Devenish, known as Soiscél Molaisse ('Gospel-book of Molaise'). The original part appears to have been an 8/9th-century portable chasse, but in the early 11th century, it was converted for use as a book shrine at the behest of Cennfaelad (d. 1025), abbot of Devenish, whose name appears in the inscription. Further decorations were added at a later age. It is currently kept in the National Museum of Ireland, Dublin.
