= Garrycastle =

Garrycastle Garraí an Chaisleáin (Irish)
- Barony
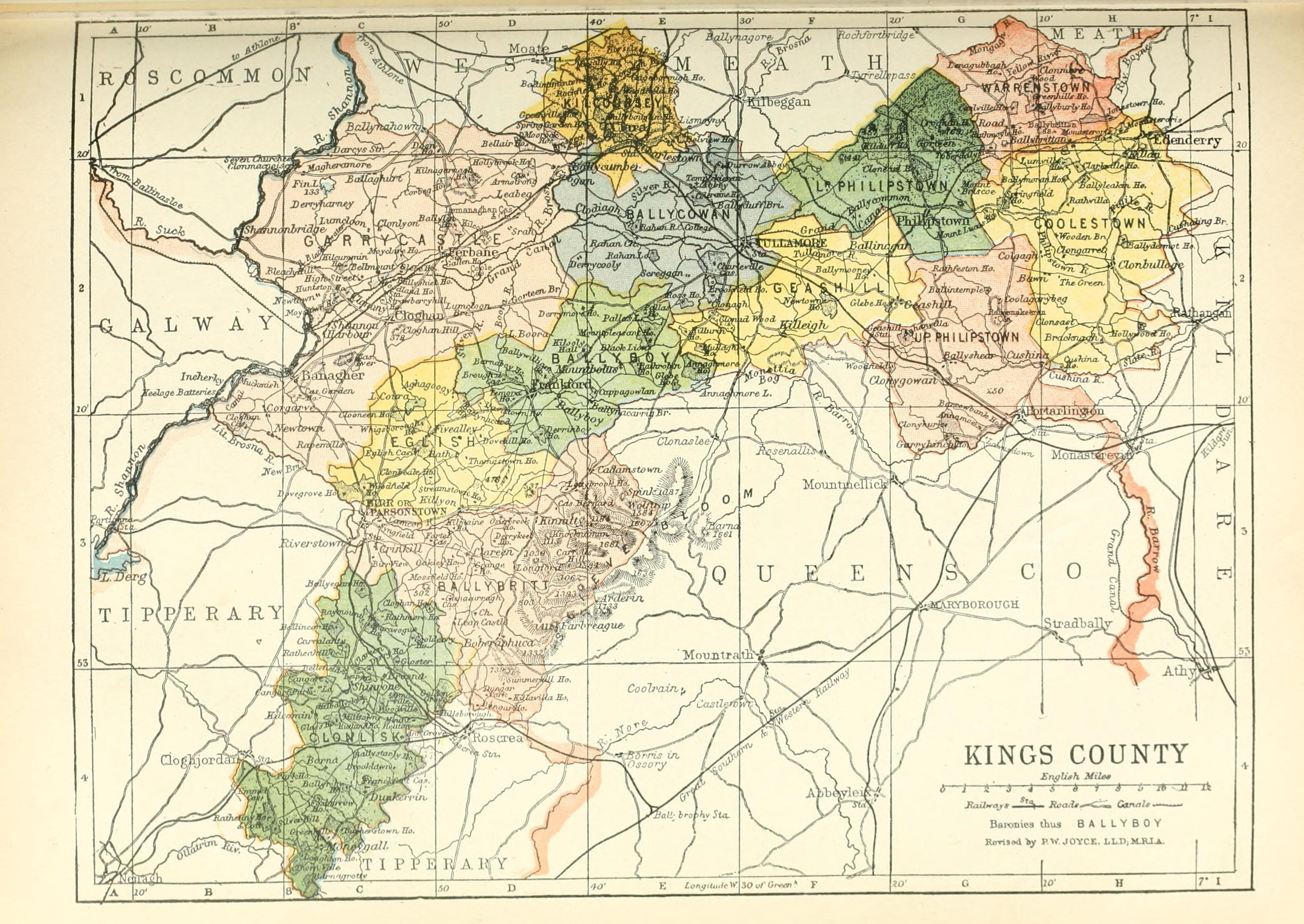
- Baronies of County Offaly. Garrycastle is shaded pink.

- Location within Ireland
- Coordinates: 53.24126°N 7.87756°W
- Sovereign state: Ireland
- County: Offaly

Area
  - Total: 416.18 km^{2} (160.69 sq mi)

Garrycastle (Irish: Garraí an Chaisleáin) is a barony in County Offaly (formerly King's County), Ireland.

== Etymology ==
The name Garrycastle is from the townland Garrycastle (Garraí an Chaisleáin, "court of the castle"; located south of Banagher), the site of Castle Garden House and earlier fortresses.

== Location ==
Garrycastle is located in westernmost County Offaly, on the east bank of the Shannon and containing most of the lower Brosna valley. The Little Brosna River marks its southern bounds.

== History ==
Garrycastle was the ancient territory of the Delbna Ethra, represented in later times by the Mac Cochláin (MacCoughlan) sept. They were lords of Ahra, and chiefs of Delvin MacCoughlan. The Colgan family was also centered in this barony, as was the Mac Uallacháin (MacCuolahan) sept of Muintir Cionaetha. The Ó Maoileoin (O'Malone) sept is cited with early events involving Clonmacnoise in the northwest corner of this barony. Ó Madagain or Ó Madadhain (O'Madagan or O'Madden) of the Clan Colla are given as chiefs of Síol Anmchadha just west of here in the barony of Longford in County Galway.

== List of settlements ==
Below is a list of settlements in Garrycastle:

- Ballycumber
- Banagher
- Cloghan
- Ferbane
- Pollagh
- Shannonbridge
