= O'Flanagan =

O'Flanagan is an Irish surname.

According to historian C. Thomas Cairney, the O'Flanagans were one of the chiefly families of the Éile tribe who in turn came from the Dumnonii or Laigin who were the third wave of Celts to settle in Ireland during the first century BC.

Notable people with the name include:

- Kevin O'Flanagan (1919–2006), Irish former sportsman, physician and sports administrator
- Michael O'Flanagan (1876–1942), Irish Republican and Roman Catholic priest
- Mick O'Flanagan (1922–2015), Irish former soccer and rugby union international
- Patrick O'Flanagan (born 1947), Irish geographer and academic
- Robert Dermot O'Flanagan (1901–1972), U.S. Catholic bishop
- Sheila O'Flanagan (born 1958), Irish fiction writer and journalist who currently writes for the Irish Times

== See also ==
- With v O'Flanagan, an English contract law case concerning misrepresentation
- Irish clans
