= Soiscél Molaisse =

11th-century Irish book shrine

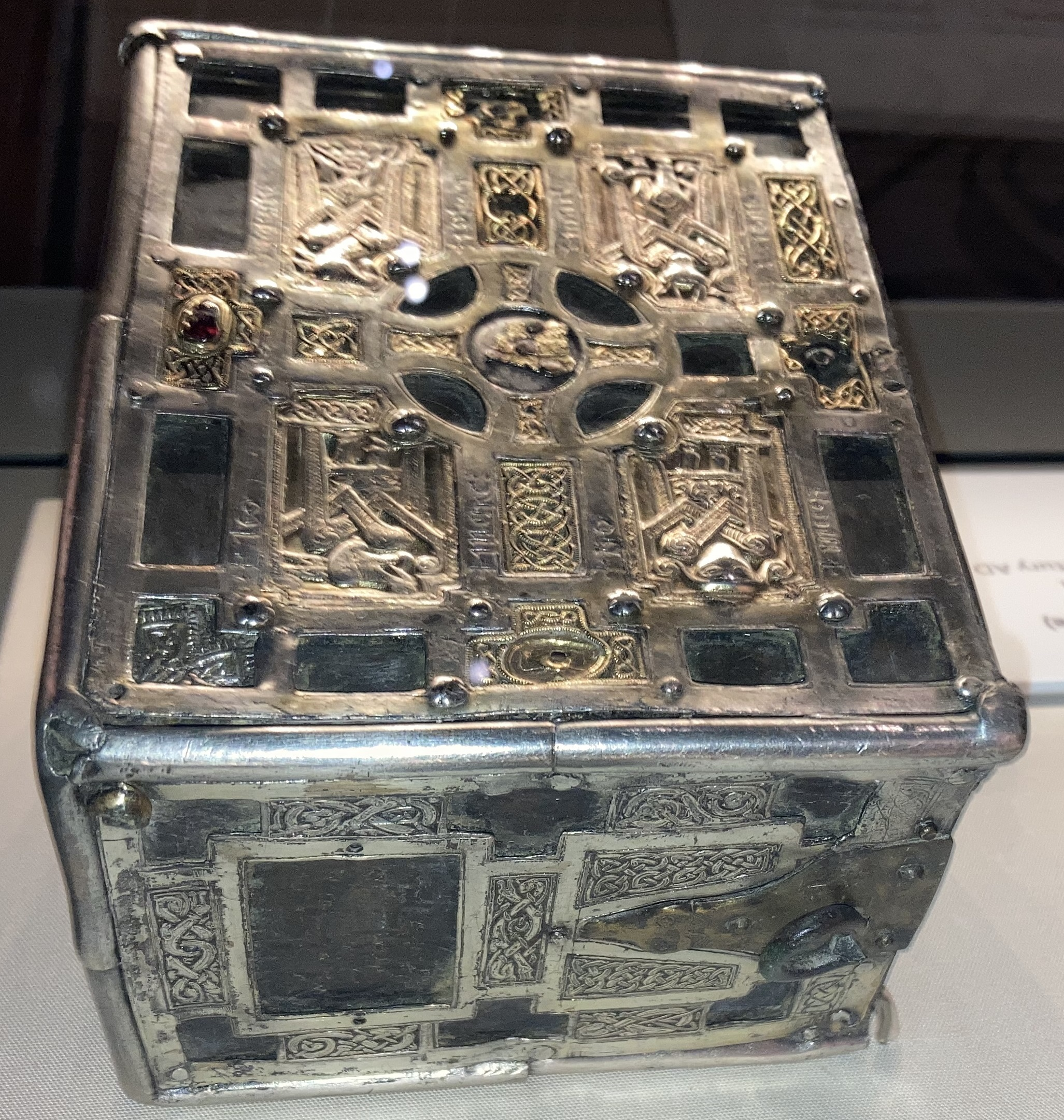
- The Soiscél Molaisse
- Material: Wooden core with bronze, copper, tin and silver
- Size: Height: 14.75 cm (5.81 in); Width: 11.70 cm (4.61 in); Depth: 8.45 cm (3.33 in)
- Created: 8th century, c. 1001–1025, 15th century
- Discovered: c. 1835; Devenish Island, County Fermanagh, Ireland
- Present location: National Museum of Ireland, Dublin

The Soiscél Molaisse (/ˈsiːʃˌkɛl ˌmɒˈlæʃ/ SEESH-kel mo-LASH; 'Gospel of St. Molaisse') is an Irish cumdach (a type of ornamented metal reliquary box or carrying case for a holy book) that originated from an 8th-century wooden core embellished in the 11th and 15th centuries with metal plates decorated in the Insular style. Until the late 18th century, the shrine held a now-lost companion text, presumed to be a small illuminated gospel book associated with Saint Laisrén mac Nad Froích (d. 564 or 571), also known as Molaisse or "Mo Laisse". In the 6th century, Molaisse founded a church on Devenish Island in the southern part of Lough Erne in County Fermanagh, with which the cumdach is associated.

The shrine was constructed in three phases. The 8th-century original wooden box was embellished sometime between 1001 and 1025 with a silver frame under the direction of Cennefaelad, abbot of Devenish. This included embossed silver plates, a front piece depicting a cross, the figures and symbols of the evangelists, and series of Latin inscriptions. These additions form the bulk of the remaining object. A third phase, dated to the 15th century, incorporates further silver elements, although most have been lost. The Soiscél Molaisse is the earliest surviving cumdach, and with a height of just 14.75 centimetres (5 13/16 in), also the smallest.

The small size of the Soiscél Molaisse suggests that its companion text was meant to be carried as a pocket gospel book. That book was assumed until the 19th century to have been transcribed by Molaisse. The cumdach was held by the hereditary keepers O'Meehan family of Ballaghameehan, County Leitrim until the mid-19th century, and was acquired by the Royal Irish Academy in 1861, an acquisition supported by Lord Dunraven and George Petrie. It is now in the collection of the archaeology branch of the National Museum of Ireland on Kildare Street, Dublin.

== Dating ==
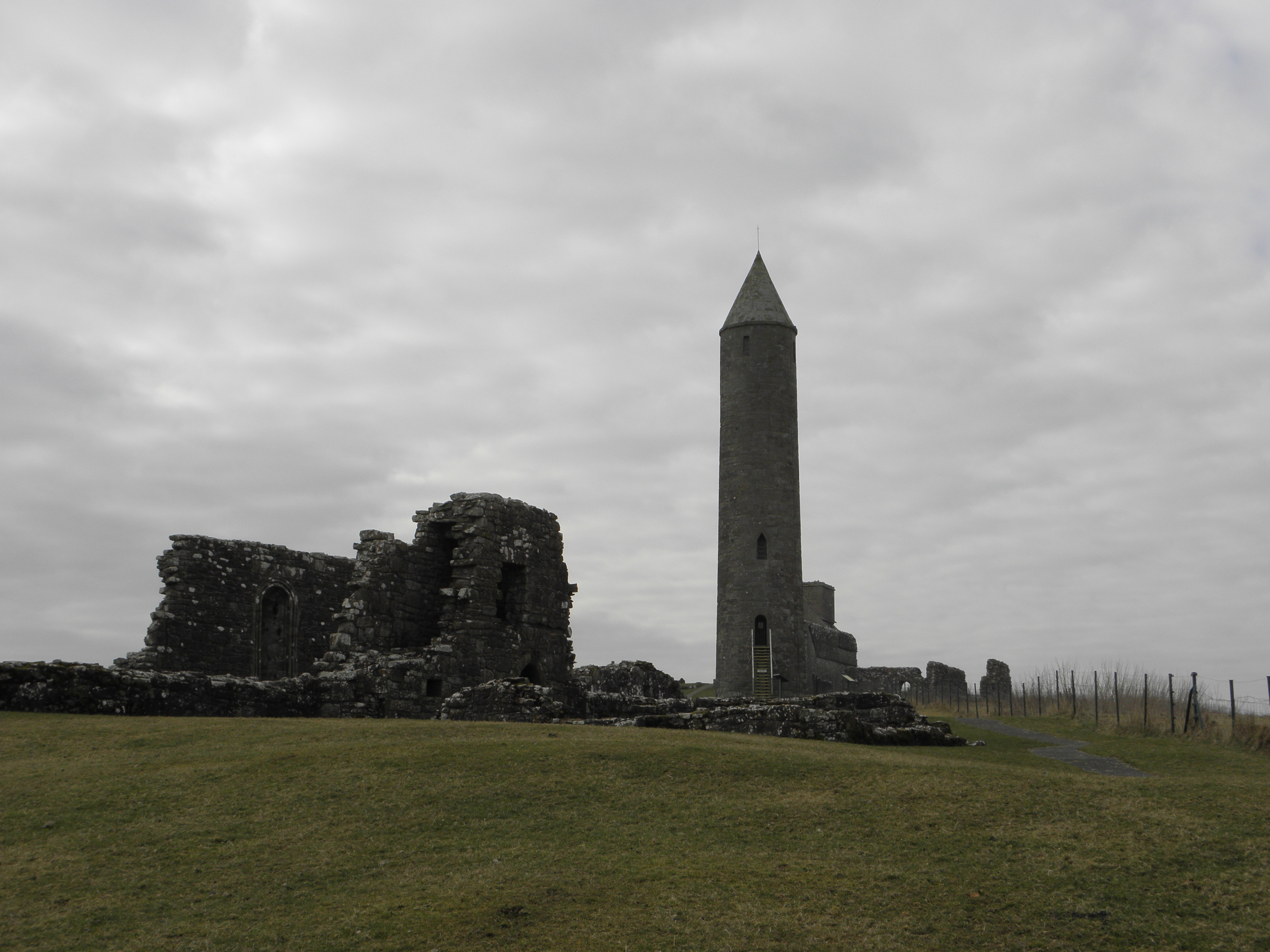
Ruins of the monastic site on Devenish Island. Shown are the Teampall Mór church and medieval round tower.

The Soiscél Molaisse was constructed in three phases: the rather plain 8th-century wooden core has bronze casing that once held a small illuminated manuscript. This book is assumed to have been a Gospel and was traditionally associated with the 6th-century Laisrén mac Nad Froích, also known as St. Molaisse (d. 564 or 571), who founded the church on Devenish Island on Lough Erne in County Fermanagh, where the shrine was kept. The island still contains the remains of the monastery site, including the small Teampall Mór church, his cell, and the round tower in which the Soiscél Molaisse was kept over the centuries.

The book was lost sometime in the late 18th century, and almost nothing of its content or style was recorded. The 8th-century dating of the core and its manuscript is based on its dimensions, which would have been larger in earlier centuries. The object was heavily embellished and added to between 1001 and 1025 when bronze, copper and silver plaques were fastened with nails and rivets. Embossed silver plates were added in the 15th century, but are now mostly lost.

The 11th-century inscriptions on one of its long sides are signed by the metalworker Gilla Baíthín, along with the names of its commissioners "Cennfailad" (d. 1025, a successor of Molaisse who was an abbot at Devenish from 1001), (Note: The Annals of the Four Masters record "A.D. 1025, Cennfaeladh son of Flaithbheartach, successor of Molaise of Daimhinis, fell as sleep in Christ".) and "Ua Sclan" (unidentified, possibly an administrator at the island). The dating of this phase to between 1001 and 1025 is based on the mention of Cennfailad, making it the oldest-surviving fully intact cumdach or "book shrine" (an elaborate ornamented metal reliquary box or case used to hold Early Medieval Irish manuscripts or relics). Baíthín would have worked during the Viking invasions of Ireland, and some Viking influence is apparent, such as the long, stringy bodies of the snake-like animals on the sides.

== Description ==
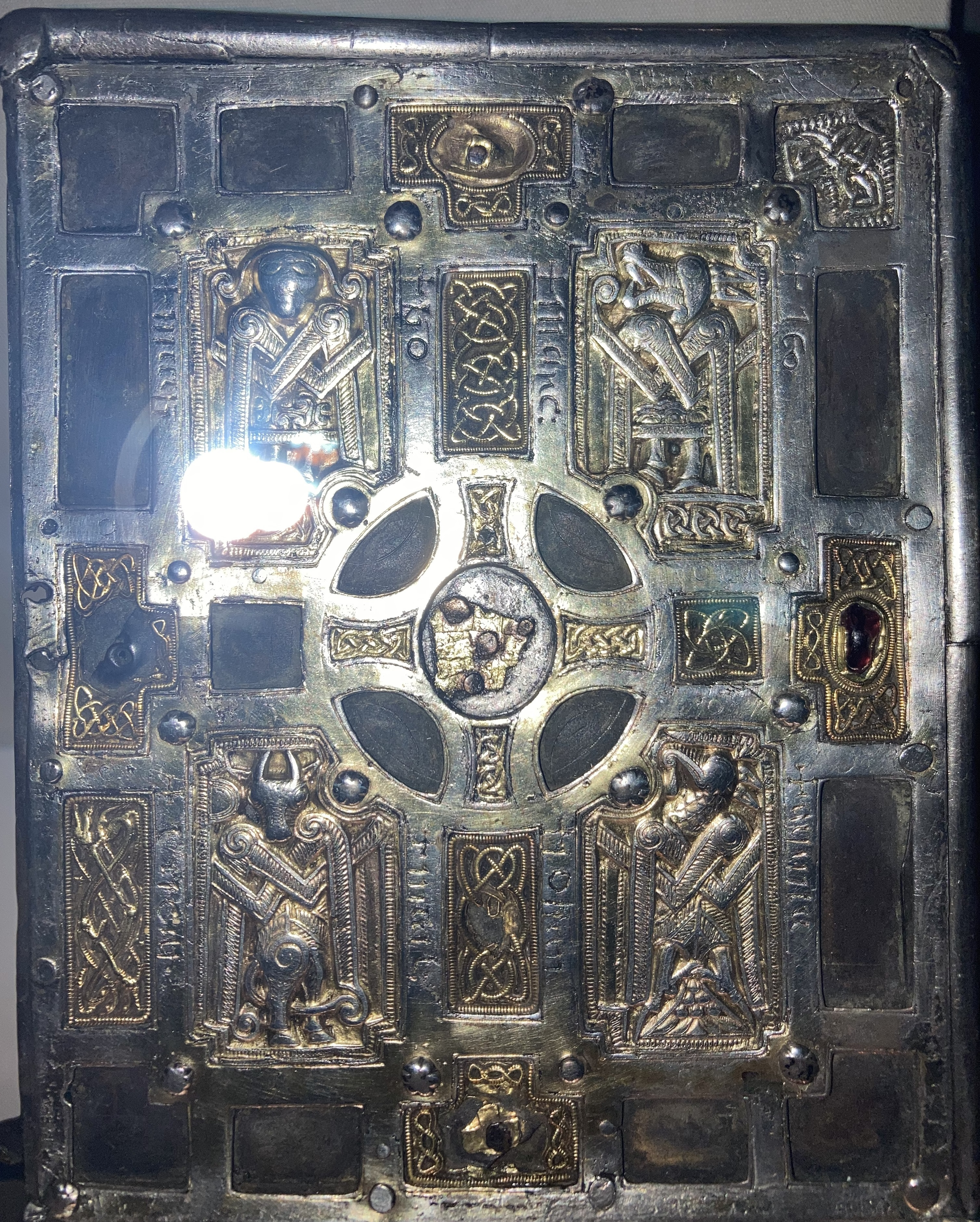
Main face of the Soiscél Molaisse

The shrine is oblong in shape and measures 14.75 centimetres (5.81 inches) high, 11.70 cm (4.61 in) wide and 8.45 cm (3.33 in) thick, making it the smallest of the extant Irish pocket-book Gospels. It is similar in size, type and function to the extant shrine for the 8th-century Book of Dimma, although the casing is much thicker, suggesting that it had either contained additional texts to the Gospels or had more illuminated pages. The manuscript was made from vellum parchment and contained text from the Gospels. Until the early 19th-century, the book was thought to have been written or owned by St. Molaisse; one late medieval text describes how it was "sent down to him from heaven while on a pilgrimage to Rome". The gospel was lost (and the cumdach damaged) in the late-18th century while on loan to McLoughlin, who was a priest from either County Sligo or County Roscommon.

The original 8th-century inner oblong box is made from yew wood. It was enshrined in the early 11th century with a cumdach made up of plain sheets of tinned bronze decorated with openwork silver and mountings. The Soiscél Molaisse has six sides: the front piece and its the reverse, two long sides, and two end sides. There are hinged fittings at both of the ends, to which a strap or chain could be attached for carrying during processions, swearing of oaths or other ceremonies.

The shrine is in relatively poor condition. The "roof" or "house-shaped" portions are lost, as are most of its jewels. The 15th-century additions, largely embossed silver plates, are now also mostly missing.

=== Front piece ===
A ringed cross dominates the front face, with rectangular terminals decorated with insert panels of filigree and settings for semi-precious stones, which are lost except for one blue stone on the right side. The filigree on the arms of the cross is gilded and decorated with ribbon interlace. Some of the panels on the front face are missing, and those that remain are in bronze and silver-gilt, with gold filigree interlaced knotwork. Like other contemporary Insular objects found in nearby areas, such as the 12th-century stone figures on White Island on Lough Erne, and the Breac Maodhóg from Drumlane, County Cavan, it contains series of closely related figures.

The central panels depict the four Evangelists and their symbols and are placed in the spaces between a ringed cross. The Evangelists are depicted in profile or full front, standing behind large angular ribbons, and their names and representative figures are inscribed in Latin on each side of their silver frames. These read:

+ HO + MATH, + LEO + MARC, + AQUILA + IOHAN, + UITUL + LUCAS

Art historian Paul Mullarkey interprets these inscriptions as reading "the man (Matthew), the lion (Mark), the eagle (John) and the ox (Luke)". The figures are rendered in a style that closely resembles those on the cumdachs of the near-contemporary Stowe Missal and slightly later Breac Maodhóg. The scholar of medieval art, Roger Stalley, describes the somewhat squarish style of the figures in these works as "heavy and massive".

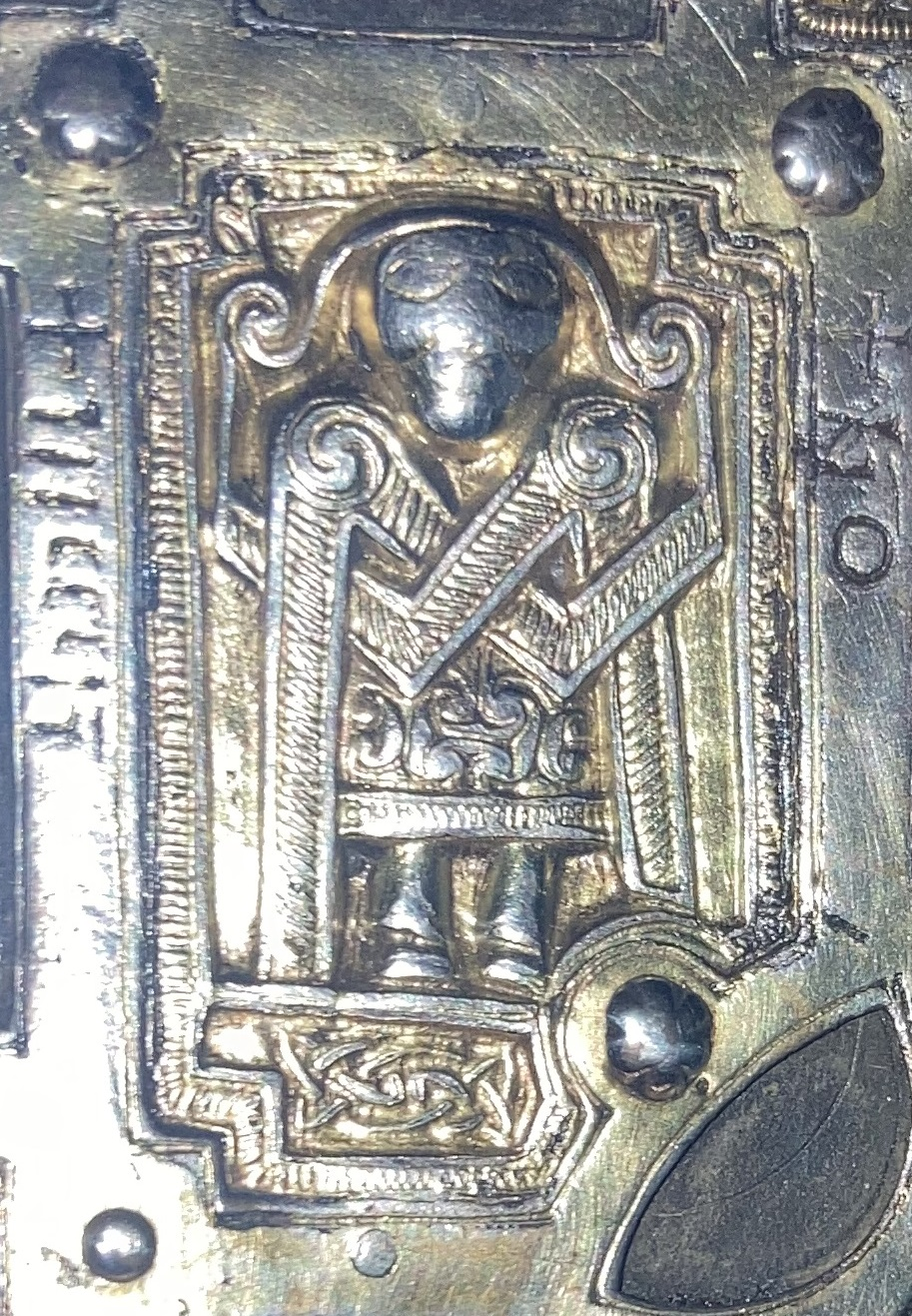
Detail of front panel; top left-hand panel (Matthew the Apostle, the man). The vertical Latin on the right reads Homo.

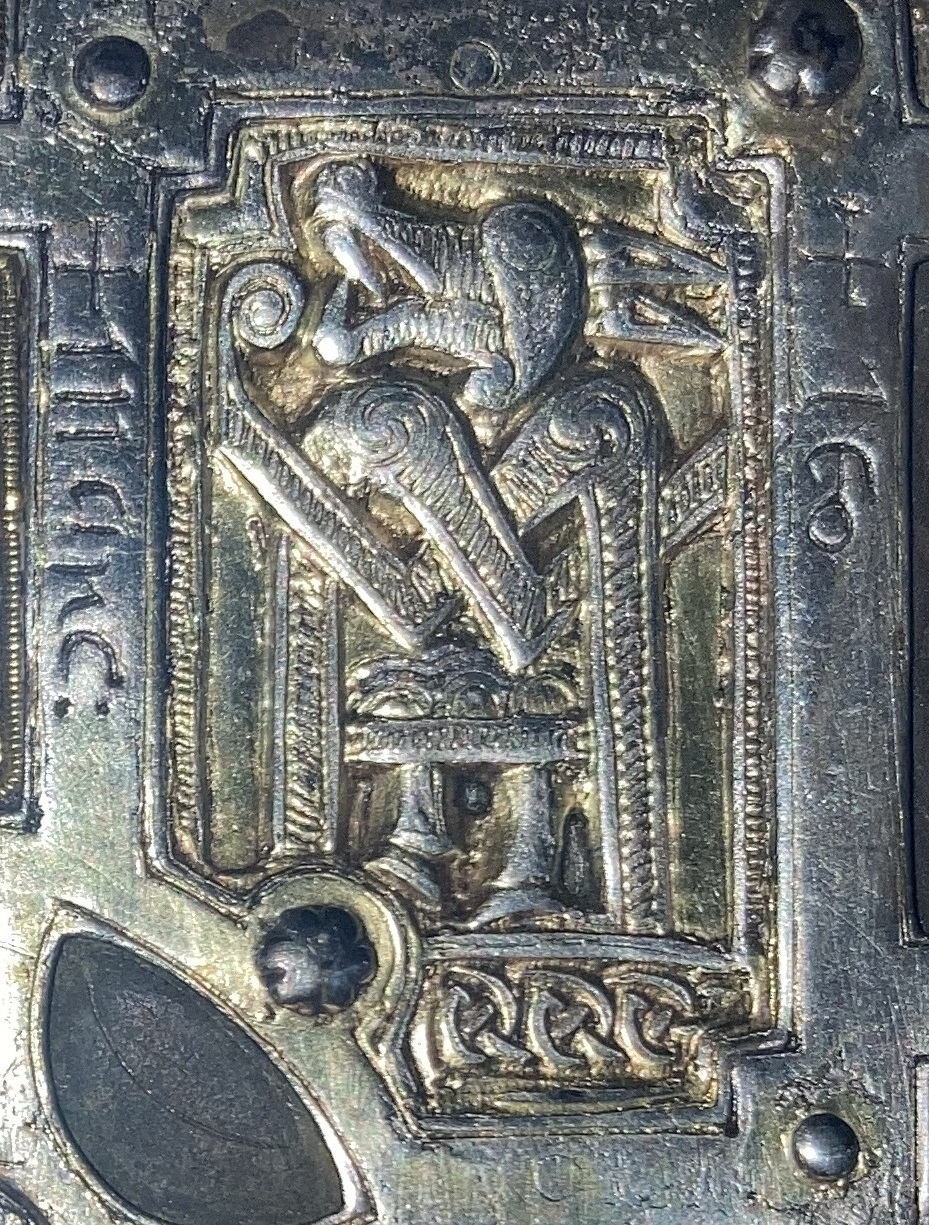
Top right-hand panel (Mark the Evangelist, the lion). The inscription on the right-hand side is translated as "Leo".

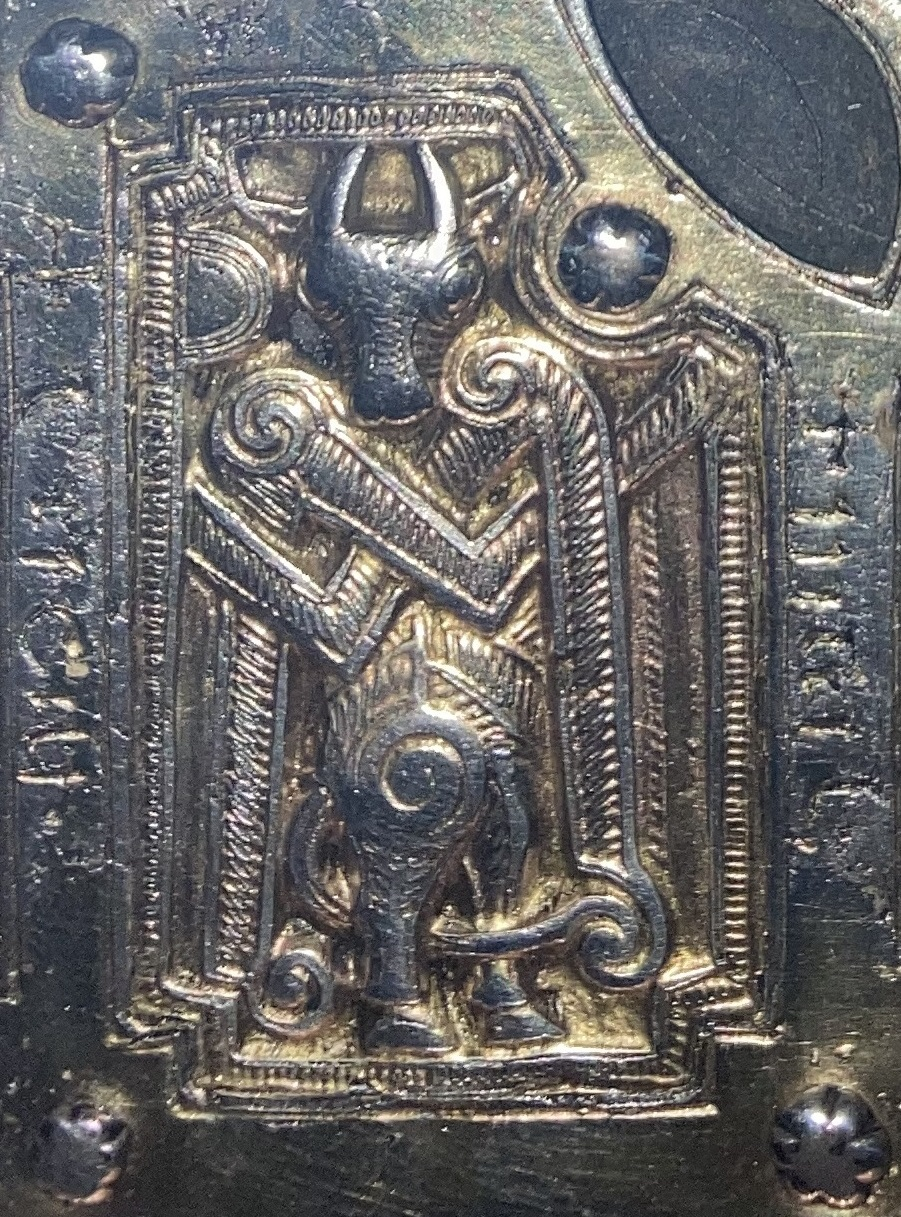
Lower left panel (Luke the Evangelist, the ox)

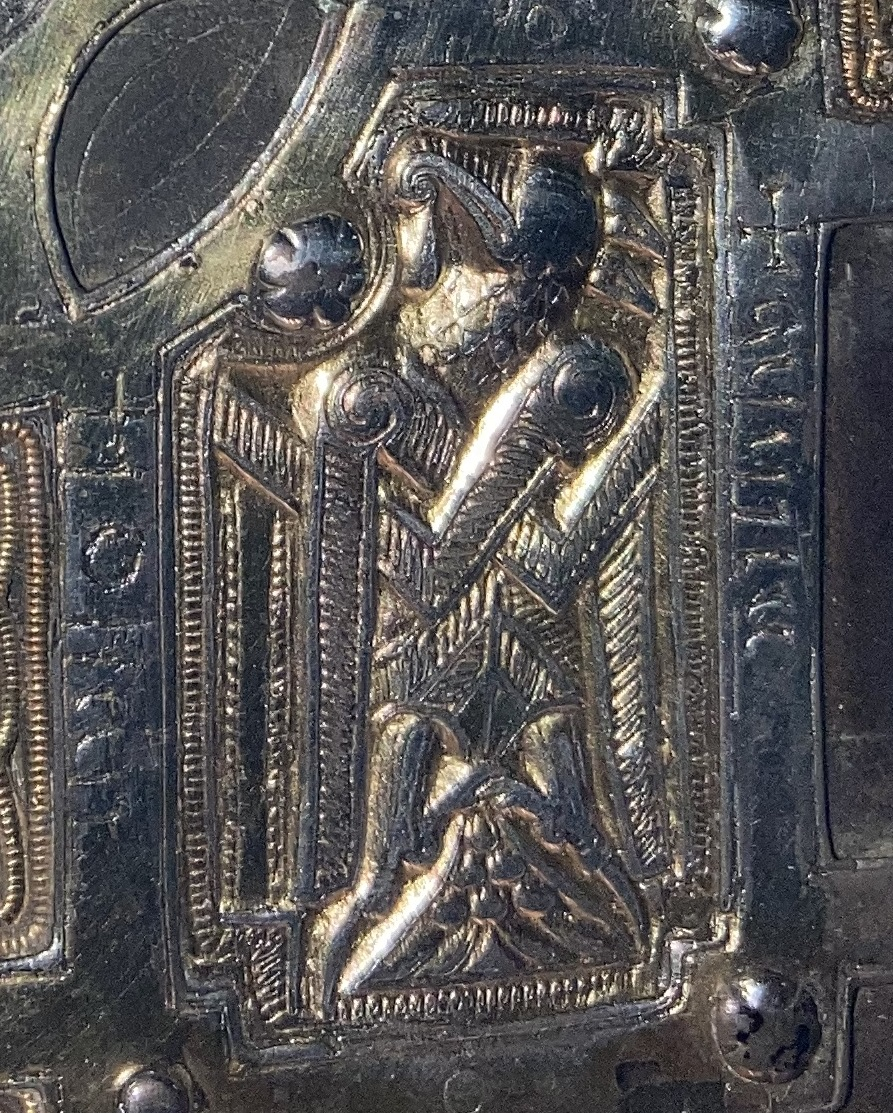
Lower right panel (John the Evangelist, the eagle). The inscription on the side translates as "Aquila".

Matthew wears a knee-length tunic containing a row of shields (peltae) in the La Tène style, positioned above a wide hem. His long hair curls into spirals which merge with the surrounding ribbon pattern. Mark is shown in profile with large, animalistic teeth and donkey-like ears, and also wears a half-length tunic with interlocking scrolls. Luke is represented by an ox, whose hind leg and tail lead into spiral patterns. John, as the eagle, has feathers, pointed ears, large talons and a broad tail. A tear-shaped drop, which may be blood, hangs from the coiled beak.

=== Reverse, side and end panels ===
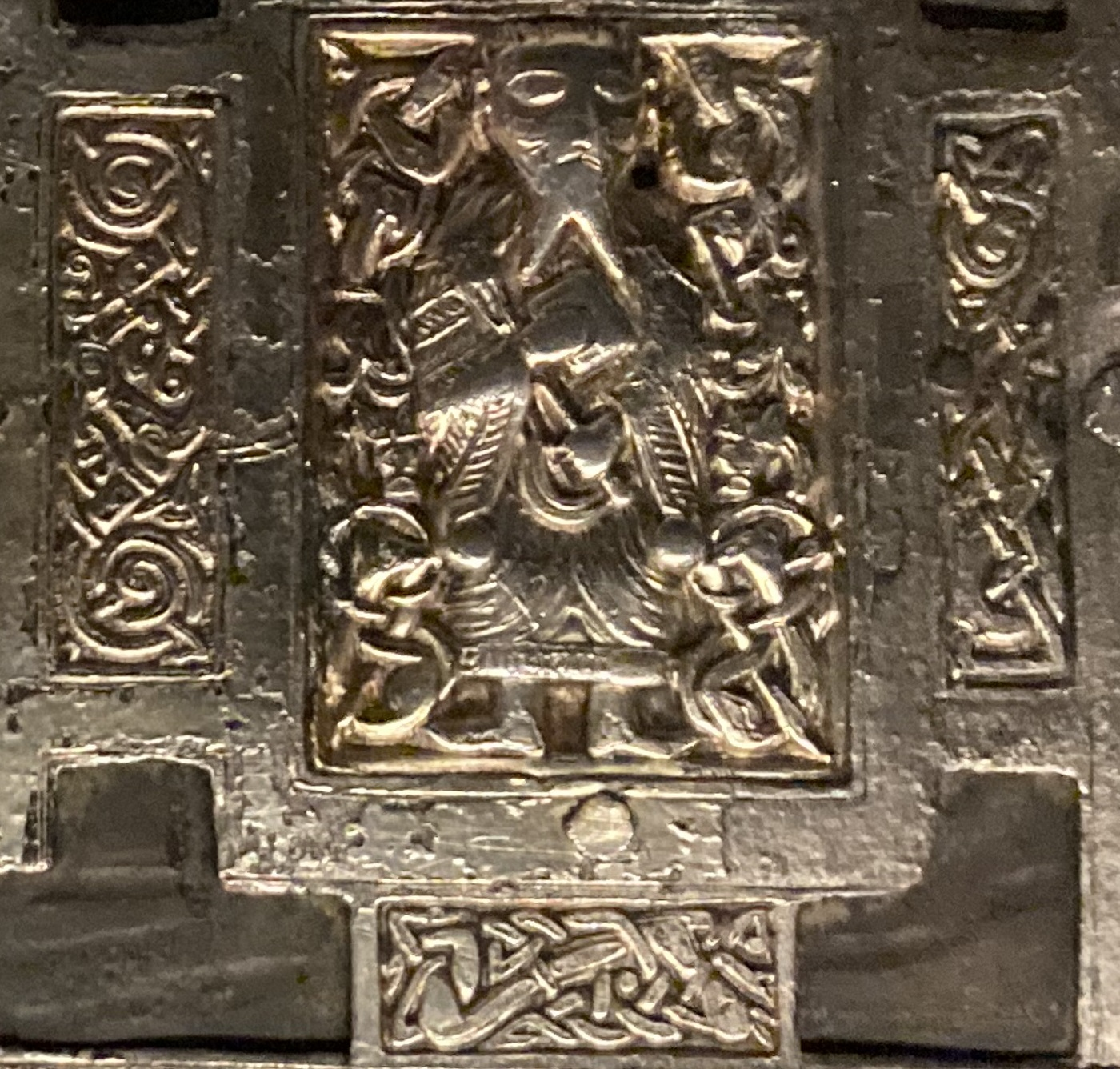
Detail of a figure (possibly St. Molaisse) with a forked beard holding a book

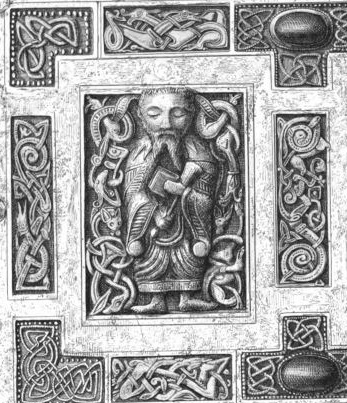
19th-century drawing of the figure by Margaret Stokes

Two of the panels around the sides are lost. The two remaining side panels contain interlace, signatures and other Latin inscriptions around their borders. Both of the short (or end) sides have triangular bronze mounts that would have functioned as clasps so that the shrine could be carried. Both have half-length decorative panels to hold inserts of ecclesiasticals. One is lost but the one that remains contains a figure, generally assumed to be St. Molaisse, in full profile wearing a tunic or habit. He has rounded facial features, a disproportionally large head, and a forked beard. He holds a book, probably his Gospel, to his chest with one hand and a pastoral staff, a flail or a sprinkler for holy water with the other. His outer vestment, or chasuble, was originally embroidered by palm-leaf designs, while the collar is cut in sharply pointed V-shapes. (Note: Margaret Stokes describes the V-shaped collars as similar to the so-called "vandyke collars" associated with many portraits by Anthony van Dyck.)

The insert is surrounded by highly ornate and intricate panels decorated with filigree and ribbon interlace. It also contains triquetra (triangular figures composed of three interlaced arcs) knots and a zoomorphic lizard "whose head is formed with very long ears [that resemble] horns". The two long sides consist of a silver plate divided into three compartments, which would have held decorative inserts, but these are now lost. Both long sides have corners with bronze mountings.

The base contains a grid of L-shaped openwork patterns in red enamel. The ends have large chain-rings or knots that bear obvious influence from Viking art, and many other aspects of the shrine resemble objects uncovered during 20th-century archaeological digs of Viking Dublin, to the extent that Ó Floinn suggested in 2014 that Dublin might have been its place of origin.

== Inscriptions ==
The Latin inscriptions are written in Insular script and appear along three edges of the page-end side (i.e., the long side missing the insert and positioned opposite to the front piece). They mention three individuals, but the text is badly damaged in places. Cennfailad Mac Flaithbertach, an abbot at Devenish Island (d. 1025), is identified as commissioner. The fragmentary "...nlan" is unidentified; the lettering "Gilla Baíthín" is the autograph of the metalworker who carried out the embossment. As with most inscriptions of this era, the order the names appear indicates their relative rank; in this case the name of the secular patron is followed by that of the ecclesiastical patron, followed by that of the scribe.

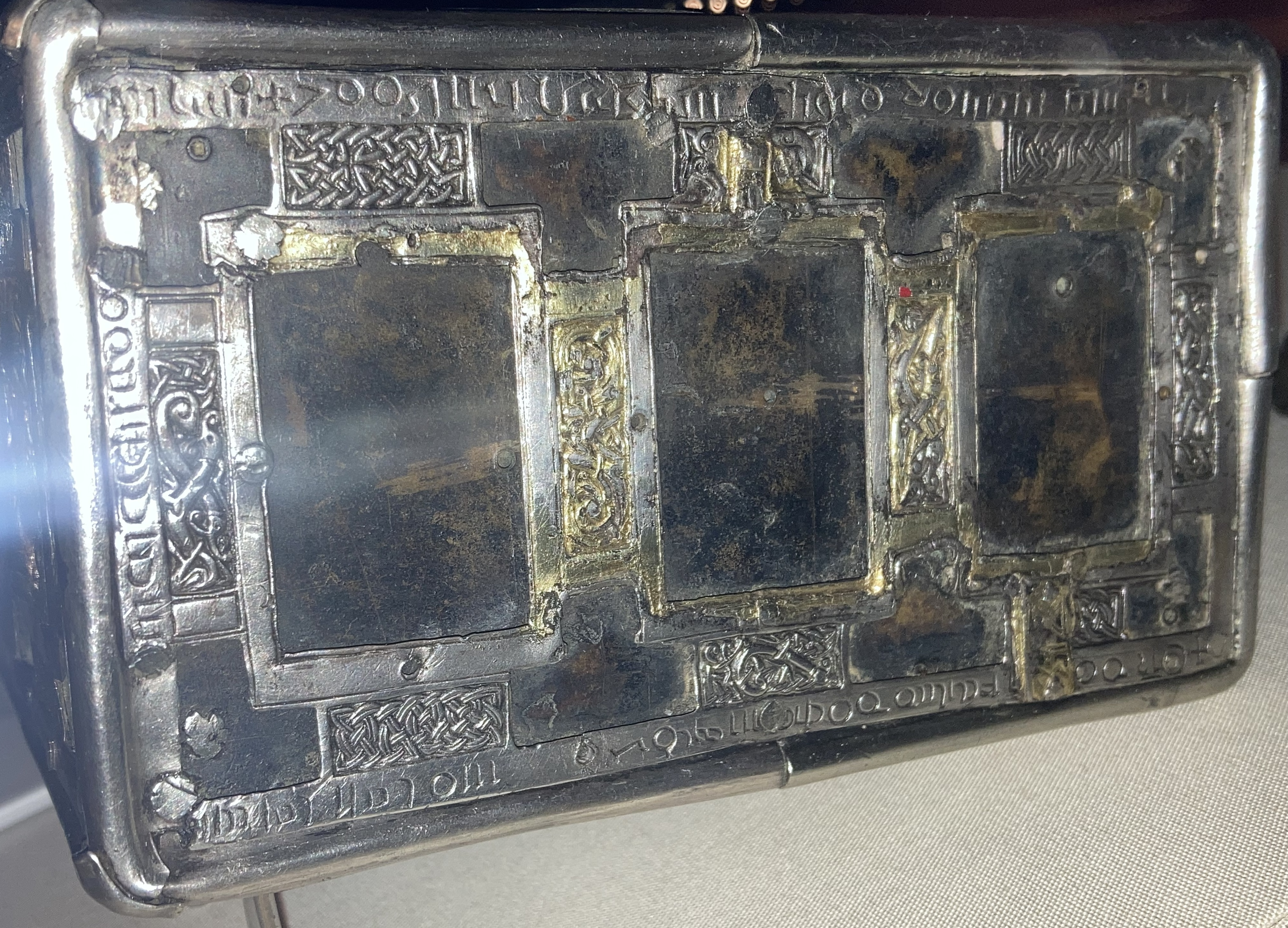
Long side with openwork patterns and the inscriptions identifying the 11th-century commissioners and craftsman

The inscriptions read:

...OR DO ... NFAILAD DO CHOMARBA MOLASI LASAN ... IN CUTACHSA DO .. . NLAN .. DO GILLABAITHÍN CHERD DO RIGNI I GRESA ("Pray for Cennfaílad, successor of Molaise, for whom was made this shrine, for . . . nlan + and for Gilla Baíthín, the craftsman who made this object").

Mac Flaithbertach had two obituaries in 1025, but like nearly all 11th-century craftsmen, nothing is known of Gilla Baíthín. Analysis of the style and technique of the 11th-century phase indicate a single hand created the figurative panels on the front and sides, the filigree, the zoomorphic panels and the strap-hinge. The art historian Mitchell Perette describes Baíthín's script as "remarkably uneven". The first-name Gilla is also inscribed on later 11th- and 12th-century Irish high crosses and churches, indicating that it was a name "taken for Christian life", and that Baíthín was a cleric. The art historian Patrick Wallace notes that the naming of a craftsman in such an early work indicates the esteem Insular craftsmen must have enjoyed in contemporary Irish society, noting how mainland European artists did not begin to sign their works until the Renaissance. He goes on to write that the signature may be "one of the earliest instances anywhere of a culture which made such acknowledgement[s]."

Several art historians have tried to piece together the person identified by the damaged "...nlan" lettering, and it is generally assumed to be part of the name "Scannlain". Ó Floinn suggests Coencomrach Ua Scannlain (d. 1011) as a potential candidate. Ua Scannlain was a cleric at Devenish, but although he fits the location and period, his full name is too long for the gap in the lettering and it is very unlikely he would have been mentioned by surname only. Other potential clerics are Scannlain Ua Dungalaín, abbot of Downpatrick, who was "abducted and blinded in 1010", and Scanlan Mac Cathail, ri Eoganacht of Lough Leane, although neither are considered strong candidates by most art historians.

== Provenance ==
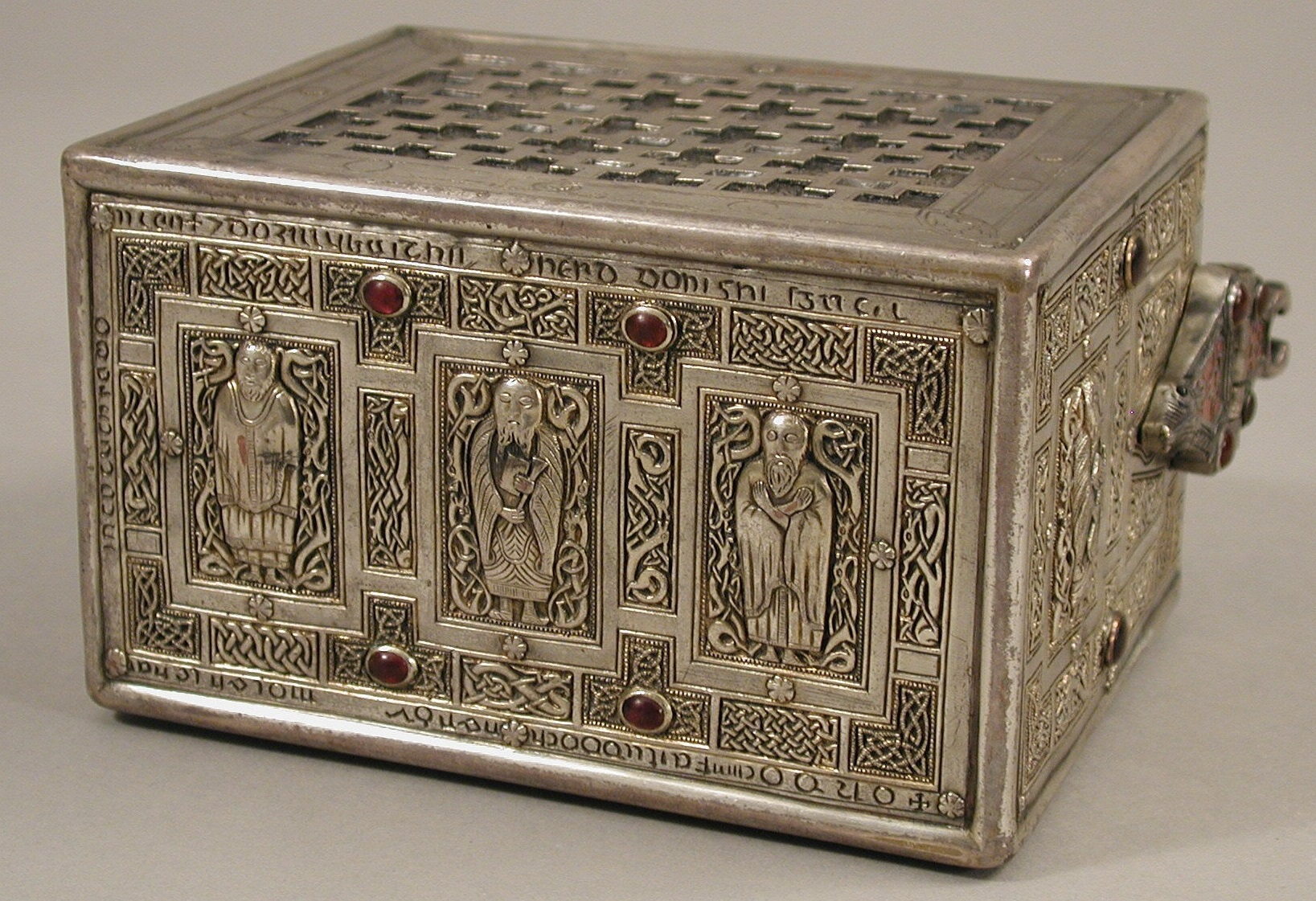
View of one of the long sides of the New York replica, with visible strap hinge. Openwork patterns can be seen on the top facing side. The figures on the side are lost from the original cumdach.

The shrine's hereditary keepers were the O'Meehan family of County Leitrim, who held it for some 500 years. It is mentioned by the Irish Annals as in their collection in 1336, 1419 and 1437. Like many such medieval Irish objects kept in hereditary collections across centuries, it became sought after during the mid-19th-century Celtic Revival. The Irish painter and antiquarian George Petrie claimed to have rediscovered the object, which he titled "The Shrine of Saint Molash", having read a local newspaper article about it c. 1835. Several accounts record that the antiquarian and collector Roger Chambers Walker became aware of the shrine around the same time and had been interested in acquiring it. He was a rival collector to Petrie, even having asked Petrie to keep the discovery a "secret" and "remain silent"; he lost out on the eventual purchase sometime during or after 1845.

In 1867, the antiquarian and illustrator Margaret Stokes speculated that Petrie had heard about it from Walker. Petrie gave its first full description at an 1855 lecture for members of the Royal Irish Academy, and it has been subject to a series of further examinations and descriptions since then. Building on Petrie's research, Stokes published another account of the shrine's history in 1871.

Its last hereditary keeper, Charles Meehan of Latoon, County Clare, sold it in April 1859 for £45. At the insistence of Lord Dunraven and Petrie it was purchased for the Royal Irish Academy in 1861. The academy found it difficult to raise the money, given that their usual annual budget was at the time about £50, and Petrie was instrumental in raising funds, backed by Dunraven's political clout; Dunraven had first arranged for it to be made available for Petrie to study. Today it is in the collection of the archaeology branch of the National Museum of Ireland on Kildare Street, Dublin, where it is catalogued as NMI R4006.
