= Larry Boylan =

American educator

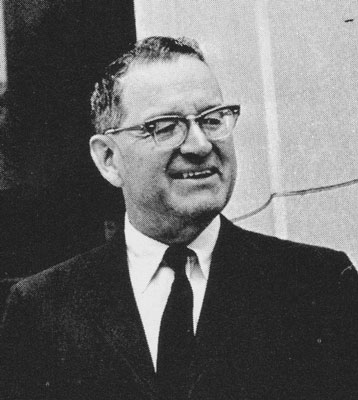

Interim President of the Kansas State Teachers College
- In office August 1, 1966 – February 14, 1967
- Preceded by: John E. King
- Succeeded by: John E. Visser

Personal details
- Born: Laurence Charles Boylan; November 26, 1908 Le Roy, New York
- Died: March 10, 1997 (aged 88) Emporia, Kansas
- Resting place: Emporia, Kansas
- Spouse: Elizabeth Eldridge (m. 1946)
- Education: Allegheny College (B.A.); Cornell University (M.A.; PhD)
- Occupation: Education administrator

Laurence Charles Boylan (November 26, 1908 – March 10, 1997) was an American educator most notably for serving as an administrator at what is now known as Emporia State University. Before serving as president of the Kansas State Teachers College (KSTC), Boylan was the Dean of Graduate Studies at KSTC and served at a couple of different institutions before coming to Emporia.

== Biography ==
=== Early life and education ===
Laurence Boylan was born on November 26, 1908, in Le Roy, New York. After graduating high school, Boylan attended Allegheny College completing his bachelor of arts in 1932, and both his master's and doctorate from Cornell University. After graduating with his master's degree, Boylan served as a guidance director at the Gloversville, New York, public school district. In 1954, Boylan moved to Emporia, Kansas, to become Dean of Graduate Studies at the Kansas State Teachers College.

=== Kansas State Teachers College ===
Boylan began his twenty-year career at the Kansas State Teachers College in 1954 as the Student Services Director. In 1958, he became Dean of Graduate Studies, a position he held until he retired in 1972. From August 1966 to February 1967, he served as the Interim President of KSTC.
