= Dartraighe =

Dartraighe Dartraige
- Túath/ Tríocha Céad
- History
  - Created: uncertain
  - Abolished: 1603
  - Succeeded by: Barony of Dartree, County Monaghan
- Status: túath (Territory)
- Government: Gaelic
  - Type: Mixed Democratic Monarchy/Lordship Oireacht
- Contained within
  - Confederation: Airghialla
- Subdivisions
  - Type: Parishes/Townlands

Dartraighe (older spelling: Dartraige), anglicised as Dartree, Dartry or Dartrey, was an Irish territory or tuath in medieval Ireland which stretched north to Clones and south to the Dromore River. It was later incorporated into County Monaghan as the barony of Dartree.

== History ==
The Dartraighe were an Irish túath, also known as n-Dartraighi or Dairtre, who gave their name to a territory in the western portion of what is now known as County Monaghan. The name means "calf-people". Various anglicized forms of the name were used through the years. A segment of its southern region became the Dartrey Estate, owned by Richard Dawson in the 17th century, and known as Dawson's Grove, which is now Dartrey Forest. It includes Inner Lough with its small island - probably an old crannog, which may explain the name Dartraige Coinn innsi (Dartry of the Island Chief), which occurs in the annals, perhaps to distinguish this Dartraige from another centered in Kingdom of Breifne.

Dartraighe was listed as part of the federated Kingdom of Airgíalla in the Book of Rights, and included there in a poem credited to Benén, son of Sescnén, Patrick's cantor, though in its surviving form the composition can be dated to between 901 and 908 AD:

The king of Dartraige, a flame of valour,

is entitled to four bondsmen of great labor, four swords hard in battle, four horses,

and four golden shields.

— Lebor na gCert: The Book of Rights, translated by Myles Dillon (Irish Text Society 1962)

There are references in Irish annals in the 11th and 12th centuries to the Ui Bhaoigheallán (O'Boylans) as lords (tigherna) of Dartraige (see below). In 1297 the sub-chiefs of the Airgíalla included the lord of Dartraighe, named as the king's brother Roalbh Mac Mathghamhna. The Ui Bhaoigheallán never recovered control of Dartraighe hereafter. It was held by the Mac Mathghamhna (MacMahons) of Airgíalla.

== References in Irish annals to Dartraige ==
- 947: Scolaige ua hAedacáin, king of Dartraige, and Gairbíth son of Muiredach, heir designate of Uí Chremthainn, and Aed son of Tigernán ua Ruairc were killed in battle in a counter-attack.
- 961: Ualgarc, king of Dartraige, was killed by his own people.
- 998: Domnall son of Donn Cuan, king of Dartraige, was killed by the Gailenga.
- 1006: Trénfher ua Baigheallán, tigherna Dartraighe, was slain by the Cenel Conaill on Loch Erne.
- 1093: Aodh Ua Baigheallán, tigherna Airghiall, was slain by the Conaillibh Muirthemhne.
- 1179: Defeat and slaughter [were inflicted] on the English, of Ceanannas by Maol Ruanaidh Ó Baoigheallán (king of Dartraighe), with a force of the Dartraighe.
- 1349: Aedh Mac Flannchaidh, chieftain of the Dartraighe, was slain in battle with Aedh O'Ruaire, who gained the victory.
- 1366: Cathal Mac Flannchaidh, chieftain of Dartraighe, was slain by the Clann-Muirchertaigh.
- 1457: Mag Uidhir and Philip Mag Uidhir went with a large force into Dartraighe of Con-inis and, as they did not come up with spoil, burned all Dartraighe and the town of Eogan, son of Rughraidhe Mag Mathgamna, namely, Lis-na-ngabur, and went to their houses on that expedition with victory of overthrow.
- 1486: Brian, son of Rughraidhe, son of Ardghal Mag Mathgamna (namely, lord of Dartraighe), was slain by Foreigners of the Plain of Oirghialla.
- 1505: A hosting by Ua Neill, namely, by Domnall, into Dartraighe of Oirgialla and the country was wasted and pillaged by him and Aedh, son of John the Tawny, son of Eogan Mag Mathgamna, was slain there.
