= O'Rahilly =

O'Rahilly (Irish: Ó Raithile) is an Irish surname and may refer to:

- Collegeland O'Rahilly's GAA, a Gaelic Athletic Association club on the Armagh-Tyrone border just outside Charlemont and the Moy
- Kerins O'Rahilly's GAA, a Gaelic Athletics Association club based in Tralee, County Kerry

== People with the surname ==
- Alfred O'Rahilly (1884–1969), Irish academic, Teachta Dála, and president of University College Cork
- Aogán Ó Rathaille or Egan O'Rahilly (1670–1727), Irish language poet
- Cecile O'Rahilly (1894–1980), Irish scholar of the Celtic languages
- Helen O'Rahilly, Irish television executive
- Michael Joseph O'Rahilly (1875–1916), self-described as The O'Rahilly, Irish republican who took part in the Easter Rising
- Ronan O'Rahilly (1940–2020), Irish businessman and creator of Radio Caroline
- Stephen O'Rahilly (fl. 2006), Irish-British physician and scientist
- T. F. O'Rahilly, (1883–1953), Irish scholar of the Celtic languages
