= Margaret Boylen =

American novelist (1921–1967)

- Born: Margaret Currier; January 12, 1921; Bozeman, Montana, U.S.
- Died: May 21, 1967 (aged 46); New York City, U.S.
- Education: Grinnell College
- Occupation: Novelist
- Spouse: Alfred Boylen (m. 1940)
- Writing career
- Notable awards: Guggenheim Fellowship (1958)

Margaret Currier Boylen (January 12, 1921 – May 21, 1967) was an American novelist. A 1958 Guggenheim Fellow, she wrote three novels: Crow Field (1946), The Marble Orchard (1956), and A Moveable Feast (1961).

== Biography ==
Margaret Currier was born on January 12, 1921, in Bozeman, Montana, to Bernice (née Chambers) and Edwin Lovejoy Currier. She and her three siblings were raised in Shenandoah, Iowa, where her mother worked at KMA as a "radio homemaker". After attending high school in her native Shenandoah. as well as two summers at Cummington School of the Arts in 1938 and 1939, she obtained her BA from Grinnell College in 1940.

On December 30, 1940, she married Alfred W. Boylen, a stage lighting designer whom she met while he worked as a teacher in Grinnell. They worked at Chekhov Theatre Studio in Ridgefield, Connecticut, and she briefly worked at Reuters as a foreign news editor.

Boylen was the author of three novels. In March 1947, she published her first novel, Crow Field, a mystery about the disappearance of a theater company's designer. She published another novel in 1956: The Marble Orchard, about a blind woman who regains her eyesight shortly before her grandmother's burial. Her third and final novel, A Moveable Feas, focuses on five orphaned siblings who become local celebrities in their hometown. In 1957, she received a MacDowell Colony Fellowship in literature. In 1958, she was awarded a Guggenheim Fellowship in creative fiction writing.

Boylen was a Democratic voter and a Protestant. At the time of her death, she lived in Greenwich Village.

Boylen died from myocardial infarction in her home on May 21, 1967; she was 46.

== Bibliography ==
- Crow Field (1946)
- The Marble Orchard (1956)
- A Moveable Feast (1961)
