= Dan O'Boyle =

Daniel O'Boyle (died November 1933) was a Catholic Irish publican murdered by Protestant loyalists in 1933.

This incident had been the first religiously motivated murder in Ireland since 1922, and initiated a series of violent acts between Catholic nationalists and Protestant unionists that ultimately led to the 1935 Belfast Riots.
