= O'Boyle family =

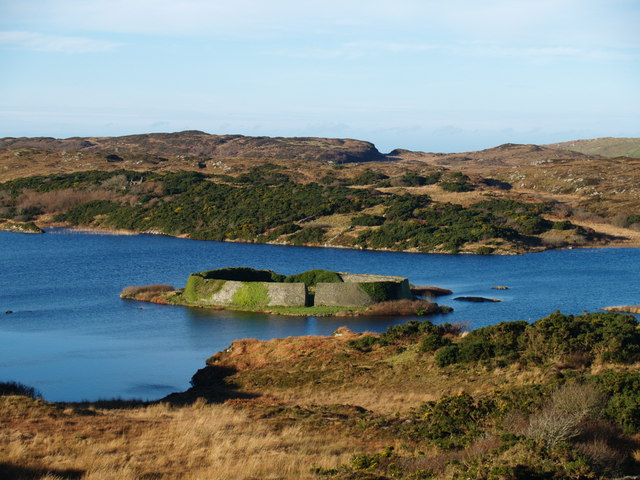
Dún Ros Beag, seat of the Uí Baoighill

The O'Boyle (Irish: Ó Baoighill) family of County Donegal were a clan of the Northern Uí Néill, a great tribal dynasty of the North Gaels descended from Niall of the Nine Hostages. The O'Boyles were one of the principal families of the Cenél Conaill within the Northern Uí Néill and originally Chiefs of the Three Tuaths in the northwest of Tír Chonaill (County Donegal). When these lands passed to The MacSweeneys (Mac Suibhne), the O'Boyle became chiefs of Tír Ainmhireach, later to be known as Críoch Bhaoigheallach, or O'Boyles country, now the Barony of Boylagh.

Within Tyrconnell,the O' Bhaoighill or O’Boyle family held positions across political administration, ecclesiastical patronage, and native military organization, giving them a notable presence in several spheres of Gaelic governance. Their lordship lay in a region of western Tyrconnell that saw little Anglo‑Norman penetration, and for this reason the O’Boyles appear infrequently in English or Anglo‑Irish administrative sources before the sixteenth century. The Ó Domhnaill rulers of Tyrconnell become more visible in English records during the Tudor period, when Crown expansion brought the English state into direct engagement with the remaining autonomous Gaelic lordships.

== Ancestry ==
This timeline traces the O'Boyle clan back to Úgaine Mór.

                               Ugainy Mór (Úgaine Mór) King 499-459 BC
                           (Foster-son of Prince Eochaidh Buadhach & Macha Mong Ruad)
                                     ¦                                 ¦                                                ¦
                             Laeghaire Lorc                         Colethach Caol-bhreagh (Cobhtach Caol mBreagh) 
                             King 459-457 BC                        King 457-407 BC
                                     ¦                                 ¦
                               Oilill Aire                          Melg Molbhtach King 388-371 BC
                          (Labhradh Loingseach)                        ¦
                                                                    Iaran Gleofathach 
                                                                       ¦
                                                                    Conla Caomh King 328-308 BC
                                                                       ¦
                                                                    Olioll Cas-fiachlach (Olliol
                                                                    III Caisfhiaclach)  King 308-283 BC
                                                                       ¦
                                                                    Eochaidh Alt-Leathan
                                                                       ¦
                                                                    Aongus Tuirmeach-Teamrach
                                                                       ¦                  ¦
                                                              Enna Aigneach            Fiacha Firmara
                                                              (Éanna III Aigneach)    (Dalriada and
                                                               King 206-186 BC         Argyle kings)
                                                                 ¦          ¦
                                               Prince Assaman Eamha      Prince Labhra Laire
                                                         ¦                  ¦
                                               Prince Roighen Ruadh      Prince Blathach
                                                         ¦
                                               Prince Fionnlogh
                                                         ¦
                                               Prince Fionn
                                                         ¦
                                               Eochaidh Feidlioch (Eochaidh X Feidhliach) King 23-8 BC
                                                         ¦
                                               Prince Bress-Nar-Lothar (Fineamhas)
                                                         ¦
                                               Lughaidh Sriabh-nDearg (Lughaidh V) King 63–71
                                                         ¦
                                               Crimthann-Niadh-Nar (Criomthann II) King 72–88
                                                         ¦
                                               Feredach Fionn Feachthach (Fearadhach Finnfeachtnach) King 93–115
                                                         ¦
                                               Fiacha Fionn Ola (Fiatach Fionn) King 115–118
                                                         ¦
                                               Tuathal Teachtmar (Tuathal I Teachtmhar) King 129–159
                                                         ¦
                                               Fedhlimidh Rachtmar (Feidhlimidh Reachtmhar) King 163–173
                                                         ¦
                                               Conn of the Hundred Battles (Conn Céad Cathach/Conn Cetchatach) King 176–211
                                                         |
                                                         |
                                               Art Mac Cuinn (Art II Aoinfhear) King 219–249
                                                         |
                                                         |
                                               Cormac MacArt (Cormac Ulfhada Mac Airt) King 254–277
                                                      |                           |
                                                      |                         St. Colum (St. Columba) Born 521
                                                      |
                            Cairbre Lifechair (Cairbre II Lifiochair) King 279–296
                                                      ¦
                                                      ¦
                            Fiacha Sraibhtine (Fiachadh V) King 297–327
                                                      ¦
                                                      ¦
                            Muiredach Tirech (Muireadhach II) King 331–357
                                                      ¦
                                                      ¦
                            Eochaid Mugmedon (Eochaidh XII) King 358–366
                                                      ¦
                                                      ¦
                            Niall of the Nine Hostages (Niall I Noigíallach/Naoighiallach) King 379–405
                                                      |
                                                      |
                            Conall Gulban (Son of Niall of the Nine Hostages)
                                                      |
                                                      |
                                              Ui Neill (Hy Niall)
                                                 |            |
                                                 |            |
                                    Northern Uí Néill       Southern Uí Néill
                                           |
                                           |
   Maoldun Baoghal (Heremon King)        Clan Conaill (Cineal Conaill)
             |                             |             |
             |                             |             | 
         Aneisleis Ó Baoighill (Donegal Chieftain)       Domhnall (Dohmnall IV Ard Mhacha Ó Néil)
                |                                     Born 943, King 956–980
                |
         O Boyle Clan

== See also ==
- O'Boyle (surname)

== Sources ==
- Jim Craig's genealogy site,
- Cairney, C. Thomas; Clans and Families of Ireland and Scotland, 1988
- Electricscotland.com
