= Harry Houlahan =

English footballer (1930–2018)

Personal information
- Full name: Harold Houlahan
- Date of birth: 14 February 1930
- Place of birth: Coundon, England
- Date of death: 5 March 2018 (aged 88)
- Place of death: Darlington, England
- Position: Inside left

Senior career*
Years	Team	Apps	(Gls)
- Durham City
1951–1952	Newcastle United	0	(0)
1952–1954	Oldham Athletic	6	(3)
1954–1955	Darlington	23	(8)
- Spennymoor United
- * Club domestic league appearances and goals

Harold Houlahan (14 February 1930 – 5 March 2018) was an English professional footballer who played as an inside left in the Football League for Oldham Athletic and Darlington, and in non-league football for Durham City and Spennymoor United. He was also on the books of Newcastle United without playing for them in the League. Houlahan died in Darlington on 5 March 2018, at the age of 88.
