= Andrew Boylan =

Andrew Boylan may refer to:

- Andrew Boylan (bishop) (1842–1910), Irish prelate of the Roman Catholic Church
- Andrew Boylan (politician) (1939–2024), Irish Fine Gael politician
