= William Cornyn =

Canadian-American linguist

- Cornyn and Maung Shwe Waing teaching Burmese to officers from OSS Detachment 101.
- Born: 1906; Vancouver, British Columbia, Canada
- Died: March 15, 1971 (aged 64)

Academic background
- Education: University of California, Los Angeles (B.A.); Yale University (A.M., Ph.D.)

Academic work
- Discipline: Linguist
- Main interests: Russian, Burmese

William Stewart Cornyn (1906–1971) was a Canadian-born American linguist and author, noted for his expertise in Burmese and Russian language studies, as well as for his research on Athabaskan and Burman etymology.

== Life ==
Cornyn was born in Vancouver, British Columbia. In 1922, he moved to Los Angeles where he first found work as a stock clerk, hall boy, and bookkeeper. He lived in San Francisco from 1924 to 1928, working as an insurance clerk, eventually returning to Los Angeles. He married twice: first to Sara Ellen Fetterman on 24 September 1928 (by whom he had son William Jr.), then to Catherine McKee on 29 January 1937 (by whom he had two sons and a daughter).

He graduated from University of California, Los Angeles (BA with highest honors, 1940), and did graduate work at Yale (AM 1942, PhD 1944), where he served as a professor of Slavic and South East Asian Linguistics and chair of both the Department of Slavic Languages and Literatures, and the Russian Area Program. Cornyn's research focused on the description of and preparation of pedagogical materials for Burmese and Russian. William Cornyn became a member of the Linguistic Society of America in 1941 while working as an Assistant in Germanic Languages at UCLA. In 1962, he was awarded a Guggenheim Fellowship in Linguistics.

He died at the age of sixty-four.

== Publications ==
=== On Russian ===
- Cornyn, W. S. (1948). "On the Classification of Russian Verbs". Language. 24 (1): 64–75. doi:10.2307/410288. JSTOR 410288.
- Cornyn, W. S. (1950). Beginning Russian. New Haven: Yale University Press. (Note: A "temporary revised edition" was published in 1959, and a "revised edition" was published in 1961.)

=== On Burmese ===
- Cornyn, W. S.; McDavid, Raven I. (1943). "Causatives in Burmese". Studies in Linguistics. 1 (18): 1–6.
- Cornyn, W. S. (1944). "Outline of Burmese Grammar: Language Dissertation No. 38". Language (supplement). 20 (4). doi:10.2307/522027. JSTOR i222648.
- Cornyn, W. S. (1945). Spoken Burmese: Book One. New York: American Council of Learned Societies.
- Cornyn, W. S. (1946). Spoken Burmese: Book Two. New York: American Council of Learned Societies.
- Cornyn, W. S. (1950). "Review: J. A. Stewart and C. W. Dunn, A Burmese-English Dictionary". Journal of the American Oriental Society. 70 (2): 133–134. doi:10.2307/595555. JSTOR 595555.
- Cornyn, W. S. (1953). "A Burmese Jātaka Commentary". Language. 29 (3): 354–358. doi:10.2307/410031. JSTOR 410031.
- Cornyn, W. S., ed. (1957). Burmese Chrestomathy. Washington, D.C.: American Council of Learned Societies.
- Cornyn, W. S.; Musgrave, John K. (1958). Burmese Glossary. New York: American Council of Learned Societies.
- Cornyn, W. S. (1967). "Burma". In Sebeok, Thomas A. (ed.). Current Trends in Linguistics: Volume 2: Linguistics in East Asia and South East Asia. The Hague: Mouton. pp. 777–781.
- Cornyn, W. S. (1968). Foreword. Breakthrough in Burma: Memoirs of a Revolution, 1939–1946 (PDF). By Ba Maw. New Haven: Yale University Press. pp. ix–x.
- Cornyn, W. S.; Roop, D. Haigh (1968). Beginning Burmese. New Haven: Yale University Press.
- Cornyn, W. S. (1970). "Aspect in the Burmese Verb Expression". Actes du Congrès International des Linguistes. 10 (4): 303–304.

=== Other publications ===
- Cornyn, W. S. (1939). "Hotel Slang". American Speech. 14 (3): 239–240. doi:10.2307/451436. JSTOR 451436.
