= Houlihan Smith & Company =

- Industry: Investment Banking
- Founded: 1996
- Founders: Richard Houlihan and Andy Smith
- Headquarters: Chicago
- Products: Mergers & Acquisitions Advisory; Business Valuations; Private Placements of Debt and Equity; Fairness Opinions; Financial Opinions for Tax and Financial Reporting Purposes; Hedge Fund Valuation; Hedge Fund Restructuring
- Website: www.houlihansmith.com

Houlihan Smith & Company was an investment banking firm that provided financial advisory and financing services to public and private businesses. Houlihan was founded in 1996 and reorganized as Houlihan Capital in 2011.

Houlihan was a provider of financial opinions, merger and acquisitions advisory, financing, and other corporate advisory services. Houlihan Smith was a broker-dealer and member of the Financial Industry Regulatory Authority (FINRA). The firm was not affiliated with any financial or investment institutions and did not have referral or financial arrangements with other brokers or dealers. It was authorized to do business in eight states: CA, FL, IL, IA, MN, NV, NY and WA. Houlihan employed approximately 125 professionals and had offices in Chicago, New York and Los Angeles. In 2006, the firm also implemented an Employee Stock Ownership Plan. Houlihan Smith & Company is now known as Houlihan Capital.

== History ==
Houlihan Smith & Company was established in 1996 by Richard Alfred Houlihan (former chairman of Houlihan Lokey Howard & Zukin Inc.) and mergers and acquisitions advisor Andrew David Smith. The two met in the early 1990s while Mr. Smith was employed with Kemper Securities (now part of Wachovia Bank) and together they sold a software company where Mr. Houlihan was chairman. The two partners formed Houlihan Smith as a multi-service investment bank with strong underpinnings in the fields of complex business valuation and M&A deal-making.

The firm's largest financial opinion was a solvency opinion provided to Reliant Energy, with its $12 billion financial restructuring. Since then, Houlihan Smith has performed more than 400 valuations and financial opinions each year. Houlihan and Smith each own 25-50% of the firm, while Charles Botchway owns 10-25% of the firm.

The increased pressure and scrutiny placed on boards of directors, special committees and key executives led Houlihan to offer fiduciary guidance for its clients through the Houlihan Smith Compendia Series, a compilation of case law that highlights actions and judgments where fiduciaries breached their duty of care and duty of loyalty. The Fairness Compendium and the Solvency Compendium communicate the stringent guidelines that fiduciaries must follow, including the business judgment rule, and the more prevalent Entire Fairness Standard. Under the Entire Fairness Standard, where a transaction involves a conflict of interest and has been contested by minority shareholders, directors bear the burden of proving the entire fairness of the transaction. Many directors and fiduciaries must take considerable measures to ensure that actions and judgment shift the burden of proof to shareholders. A common measure taken is the formation of an independent and disinterested special committee to oversee and negotiate the transaction process.

During the mid-2000s, Houlihan Smith extended its services into portfolio valuation, complex derivatives valuation and investment advisory for hedge funds, private equity groups and other alternative investment groups. A recent accounting pronouncement, Financial Accounting Standard No. 157 (FAS 157): Fair Value Measurements, has mandated the quarterly and annual reporting of fair value for companies and investment firms. The three-tiered fair value hierarchy is composed of the following observable inputs: Level 1, Level 2, and Level 3. Level 3 Inputs are typically hard-to-value, illiquid securities that require the use of an independent valuation advisor to opine on the value of these securities.

== Past operations ==
Between 2006 and 2008 Houlihan had valued billions of dollars' worth of Level 3 securities, working closely with large public companies, hedge funds and private equity firms to comply with the financial reporting requirements. Houlihan was engaged in providing independent valuations of Auction-Rate Securities (ARS) for Fortune 1000 companies. (ARS are long-term securities that hold auctions every seven to 35 days, giving the security a risk profile similar to a shorter-term security with frequent liquidity events.) Compounded by the credit crisis and lack of liquidity in the credit markets, these auctions began failing in 3rd quarter 2007. Houlihan worked closely with its clients and the Big 4 audit firms to independently value these ARS and, in certain instances, locate a secondary market for clients to unwind their portfolio of these securities.

Houlihan also represented several hedge funds and private equity firms, providing portfolio and individual security valuation, M&A advisory, risk analysis, and traditional investment banking services. Houlihan provided advisory services regarding the alternative investment marketplace and underlying complex structured financial products as well as the confidential nature and protocol of its private investment vehicle clients.

Houlihan consolidated its investment banking activities under the Houlihan Smith Capital Markets umbrella. Operating as a division of Houlihan, the group worked in the middle market and specialized in transaction sizes of $10 million to $250 million. Houlihan was involved in more than 500 mergers and acquisitions, capital restructurings, ESOP advisory engagements, private placements and financial restructurings.

== Houlihan's failed lawsuit and subsequent closure ==
In April 2010, attorneys representing Houlihan filed in Illinois state court an unopposed request for a temporary restraining order against the operator of the websites 800notes.com and Whocallsme.com. The sites contained user comments that were critical of Houlihan tactics. The temporary restraining order required all statements of a factual nature be removed from the sites and that the operator prevent users from posting comments on parts of the site connected to Houlihan's phone number. Houlihan's attorneys' uninformed claim of trademark infringement and right of publicity were cited as the reasons for the order.

In May 2010, after Public Citizen (which was representing the operator of those websites pro-bono) removed the case to federal court, the federal judge allowed the restraining order to expire, refusing to grant a preliminary injunction. In August 2010, Houlihan moved to dismiss the complaint. The company subsequently went out of business sometime during the attorney fee phase of the case, but the defendants filed for a motion for attorney fees amounting to $137,632.34 in February 2011. The case was ultimately settled for $35,000.
