= John Boylen =

Scottish footballer

Personal information
- Full name: John Boylen
- Date of birth: 29 March 1898
- Place of birth: Wishaw, Lanarkshire, Scotland
- Date of death: 5 November 1961 (aged 63)
- Height: 5 ft 6 in (1.68 m)
- Position: Outside right

Senior career*
Years	Team	Apps	(Gls)
–	Newmains Juniors		
–	Wishaw		
1921–1923	Lincoln City	59	(4)
1923	Wigan Borough	1	(0)
1923–1924	Grimsby Town	4	(0)
1924–192?	Armadale		
–	Kettering		
1926–19??	Armadale		
- * Club domestic league appearances and goals

John Boylen (29 March 1898 – 5 November 1961) was a Scottish footballer who made 64 appearances in the Football League playing for Lincoln City, Wigan Borough and Grimsby Town. He played as an outside right. He also played in the Scottish League for Armadale.
