= John Boylan (American actor) =

American actor

- Born: John J. Boylan; January 31, 1912; Canton, Ohio, U.S.
- Died: November 16, 1994 (aged 82); Bellevue, Washington, U.S.
- Occupation: Actor
- Years active: 1932–1993

John J. Boylan (January 31, 1912 – November 16, 1994) was an American film, television, and theatrical actor. One of three children born in Canton, Ohio to an Irish-American immigrant family, he began acting in 1932 when he helped found the Players' Guild for a local community theater. His working life was spent in the Ohio and Pennsylvania steel industries, but he continued acting whenever the opportunity arose, often travelling to Greenwich Village in New York City the 1930s and 1940s when regular employment was scarce. It was during these periods spent in New York that he performed on Broadway, becoming acquainted with fellow actors Burgess Meredith and John Ireland while there.

After over 40 years working in the steel industry, he retired in 1975, with his last job being the works manager at the Milton Manufacturing Company in Pennsylvania. Three years later he moved to Washington state, where he quickly established himself in the local repertory circuit, acting with the Seattle Repertory Theatre, the Bathhouse Theater, The Empty Space, and the Tacoma Actors Guild.

With more time to devote to his craft Boylan's acting career enjoyed an Indian summer, as he began carving out a successful niche in film and television with his silver-haired, moustached appearance. He played opposite John Travolta in The Experts (1989), opposite Jeff Bridges in American Heart (1992), and most notably in Twin Peaks, where he was cast as the mayor of the titular town in David Lynch's award-winning television series. He had been working in a repertory production of Much Ado About Nothing when he was spotted for the role, but was unwilling to quit just for the show. Instead, the 79-year-old Boylan would fly to Los Angeles every Sunday night after the final stage performance of the evening, spend all day Monday filming his part, before returning to Seattle in time for the Tuesday matinee, as if he had never been away.

His final film role was in 1993's Sleepless in Seattle, as an elevator operator at the Empire State Building, a role that took his life full circle; it was at the Empire State Building sixty years before that he had met his wife Jeanne, through his good friend Fred von Ritter, who was married to her sister Lynn.

A lifelong smoker, he died of lung cancer and pneumonia in Bellevue, Washington, leaving behind his wife, son John, daughter Kathy, and two grandchildren. Ironically, his "signature" performance, for which he had won a Best of Festival award at New City Theater's annual directors' festival in 1986, was in Anton Chekhov's one-man comedy On the Harmful Effects of Tobacco. His son later admitted that even while performing in this play, he had been "smoking on the sly".
