= 1936–37 Southampton F.C. season =

English football club season

Southampton F.C.
1936–37 season
- Chairman: Sloane Stanley
- Manager: George Goss (until March 1937); Tom Parker (from March 1937)
- Stadium: The Dell
- Second Division: 19th
- FA Cup: Third round
- Top goalscorer: League: Jimmy Dunne (14); All: Jimmy Dunne (14)
- Highest home attendance: League: 20,853 v Aston Villa (2 January 1937); Overall: 30,380 v Sunderland (16 January 1937)
- Lowest home attendance: 4,529 v Nottingham Forest (1 May 1937)
- Average home league attendance: 12,984
- Biggest win: 4–0 v Sheffield United (26 September 1936)
- Biggest defeat: 0–4 and 1–5 (multiple)
Home colours

The 1936–37 season was the 42nd season of competitive football by Southampton and the club's 15th in the Second Division of the Football League. Another disappointing campaign marred by financial problems and personnel changes saw the Saints finishing 19th in the Second Division league table, equalling their worst performance in the flight set just two seasons previously in 1934–35. After picking up a few early wins and starting off around mid-table, the club's form worsened and they remained in the bottom half of the standings from late-November until the end of the season. Southampton finished the campaign with 11 wins, 12 draws and 19 losses in the league, which was exactly the same tally as 1934–35, but even closer to the relegation zone with just four points more than Bradford City in 21st place – the first demotion spot.

As in all but one of the preceding nine seasons, Southampton entered and exited the 1936–37 FA Cup in the third round. The Saints faced particularly tough competition as they were drawn against Sunderland, who were the reigning champions of the First Division, in a home tie which attracted a new record attendance of 30,380. Sunderland went 2–0 up in the first half, and despite Southampton responding in the second with two goals of their own, were able to clinch a winner late on. The Black Cats went on to win the cup. As the Hampshire Combination Cup and Rowland Hospital Cup did not take place in 1936–37, Southampton played only two extra matches outside the league and FA Cup during the season, both friendlies against Third Division South clubs – losing 0–2 to Gillingham in February and drawing 1–1 with Brighton & Hove Albion in April.

Southampton used 28 different players during the 1935–36 season and had eight different goalscorers. Their top scorer was new centre-forward Jimmy Dunne, who scored 14 goals in the Second Division. Arthur Holt scored 11 goals in the league and one in the FA Cup, followed by Fred Smallwood on ten league goals. 11 players were signed by the club during the season, with six released and sold to other clubs, one brought in on loan, and one more retired. The average attendance at The Dell during 1935–36 was 12,984. The highest attendance was 30,380 against Sunderland in the FA Cup; the highest league attendance was 20,853 against Aston Villa on 2 January 1937 – almost 10,000 people lower than the FA Cup record. The lowest attendance of the season was 4,529 against Nottingham Forest on the last day of the season, 1 May 1937.

1936–37 was the only season to feature George Goss as Southampton's secretary-manager, following the departure of George Kay at the end of the previous season. Goss left in February 1937 and was replaced by Tom Parker, a former Saints player in the 1920s, who would manage the club until 1943 when he resigned.

== Background and transfers ==
Southampton underwent a long list of changes in personnel at the end of the 1935–36 season owing to the club's "worsening financial situation", as nine members of the board left (two later returned) and manager George Kay left to take over at First Division side Liverpool, taking assistant Bert Shelley with him – he was replaced by George Goss as secretary manager, while Johnny McIlwaine stepped in as assistant manager. The new management were quick to bring in new players to bolster the squad – early summer signings included amateur goalkeeper Len Stansbridge, who would become an important player for the Saints after the Second World War; Scottish inside forward Billy Boyd from Luton Town, who quickly became an important source of goals for the club; Aston Villa left-half Billy Kingdon, who appeared in all but one games in his first season at The Dell; Welsh half-back Billy Moore from Cardiff City, who made just one appearance; and Welsh winger Fred Smallwood from Macclesfield Town, another key attacker for the season.

The highlight of the summer signings, however, came in July when Irish centre-forward Jimmy Dunne moved to Southampton from top-flight side Arsenal, who had paid a near-record £8,000 for the high-scoring attacker a few seasons previously. Dunne was brought in as a replacement for the previous season's top scorer Vic Watson, who retired that summer and became a coach at Cambridge Town. He made 37 appearances in his only season with the Saints, finishing as the club's top scorer with 14 goals, all in the league. Also leaving that summer were Jack Gurry to Chester City, who had joined alongside Watson the previous year, but not secured a place in the first team; inside-forward Walter Pollard, who transferred to Brighton & Hove Albion but made no appearances and soon retired from the professional game; captain Bill Adams to West Ham United, wrapping up a ten-year stint at the club; and half-back Arthur Bradford, who had spent his entire professional playing career with the South Coast club, earning him two official testimonial matches.

Signings continued just before the start of the league campaign – in August, the club brought in two new Scottish players, Bill Kennedy and Bobby Whitelaw, from Crewe Alexandra and Albion Rovers, respectively. Kennedy quickly established himself as the Saints' new first-choice centre-half, while Whitelaw made a string of appearance in the first half of the season at right-half. In September, Stan Woodhouse wrapped up his 12-year Saints career when he joined Basingstoke Town for a final year as a player, before moving into coaching (which later brought him back to Southampton). The next month, the club completed its primary frontline with the signing of John Summers from Derby County, who took over from Dick Neal on the right wing for much of the rest of the season. Halfway through the season, the club signed Alf Charles as its first-ever black player – he made one appearance, playing at inside-left just a few days after his January arrival. Also in January, Boyd was released after sending himself a fake telegram to obtain leave from training.

In March 1937, Goss resigned as Southampton secretary-manager (McIlwaine had already stepped back from his assistant-manager role) and the club brought in former player Tom Parker as his replacement, having reportedly chosen him from 120 applicants. Parker had started his managerial career with Norwich City after retiring from playing in 1933, immediately helping them gain promotion to the Second Division as Third Division South champions. Shortly after arriving back in Hampshire, he signed inside-forward Wilf Mayer from First Division club Stoke City, who appeared in the rest of the season's fixtures. He also brought in another inside-forward, Sid Gueran, on a 15-month loan from Margate, although he only appeared in the final game of the season taking over from Mayer at inside-right (who moved to outside-right).

Players transferred in

| Name | Nationality | Pos. | Club | Date | Fee | Ref. |
|---|---|---|---|---|---|---|
| Len Stansbridge | England | GK | (England) Bitterne Boys | May 1936 | Free (Note: Len Stansbridge initially joined on amateur terms in May 1936, before turning professional that August.) | |
| Billy Boyd | Scotland | FW | (England) Luton Town | June 1936 | £350 (Note: Billy Boyd's transfer fee was intended to be £500, provided he made 21 appearances – as he did not, only the initial payment of £350 was made.) | |
| Billy Kingdon | England | HB | (England) Aston Villa | June 1936 | Unknown | |
| Billy Moore | Wales | HB | (Wales) Cardiff City | June 1936 | Unknown | |
| Fred Smallwood | Wales | FW | (England) Macclesfield Town | June 1936 | Unknown | |
| Jimmy Dunne | Ireland | FW | (England) Arsenal | July 1936 | £1,000 | |
| Bill Kennedy | Scotland | HB | (England) Crewe Alexandra | August 1936 | Unknown | |
| Bobby Whitelaw | Scotland | HB | (Scotland) Albion Rovers | August 1936 | Unknown | |
| John Summers | England | FW | (England) Derby County | October 1936 | Unknown | |
| Alf Charles | Trinidad and Tobago | FW | (England) Stalybridge Celtic | January 1937 | Unknown | |
| Wilf Mayer | England | FW | (England) Stoke City | March 1937 | Unknown | |

Players transferred out

| Name | Nationality | Pos. | Club | Date | Fee | Ref. |
|---|---|---|---|---|---|---|
| Jack Gurry | England | HB | (England) Chester City | June 1936 | Free | |
| Walter Pollard | England | FW | (England) Brighton & Hove Albion | June 1936 | Unknown | |
| Bill Adams | England | HB | (England) West Ham United | August 1936 | Unknown | |
| Arthur Bradford | England | HB | (England) Cowes | August 1936 | Unknown | |
| Stan Woodhouse | England | HB | (England) Basingstoke Town | September 1936 | Unknown | |

Players loaned in

| Name | Nationality | Pos. | Club | From | To | Ref. |
|---|---|---|---|---|---|---|
| Sid Gueran | England | FW | (England) Margate | March 1937 | June 1938 | |

Players released

| Name | Nationality | Pos. | Date | Subsequent club | Ref. |
|---|---|---|---|---|---|
| Billy Boyd | Scotland | FW | January 1937 | (England) Weymouth | |

Players retired

| Name | Nationality | Pos. | Date | Reason | Ref. |
|---|---|---|---|---|---|
| Vic Watson | England | FW | August 1936 | Retired from playing; became a coach at Cambridge Town | |

== Second Division ==
Despite the high number of personnel changes in the summer, Southampton started the 1936–37 season relatively strongly, winning three of their first five fixtures and entering the top five of the Second Division table. New signings Jimmy Dunne and Fred Smallwood both scored on their debut, the opening game of the season, in which the Saints beat recently-promoted Chesterfield 3–2 at home. Two away losses at Doncaster Rovers and Aston Villa were then followed by two more home wins, 1–0 in the return game against Doncaster and 2–0 hosting Bradford City. This positive start was short-lived, however, as they won just four more games throughout the rest of 1936, including picking up their biggest win of the season when they beat Sheffield United 4–0 later in September, thanks to doubles from Dunne and Billy Boyd. Four goals was also the margin of their heaviest defeats of the season, however, which they suffered in the first half of the season at the hands of Aston Villa (0–4) and Swansea Town (1–5) in September, and Tottenham Hotspur (0–4) in October. By Boxing Day 1936, following a run of six defeats from seven games, the Saints had dropped to 20th place in the division, just one point shy of Bradford City in the first relegation spot.

The new year saw Southampton's fortunes turn around somewhat – between 28 December and 24 February, the club went unbeaten for eight games, although only three of these were wins: 2–1 at home to Swansea, 3–1 away to Burnley (their only win on the road the whole season), and 1–0 at home to Tottenham. After the arrival of new manager Tom Parker in early March, however, the team's form suffered again and they picked up only one more victory the entire season, beating fellow strugglers Norwich City 3–1 at The Dell on 3 April. The final few months of the campaign saw the Saints struggling against numerous sides occupying the higher spots in the division, as they suffered defeats against every side that finished the season in second to sixth positions – Blackpool, Bury, Plymouth Argyle and West Ham United, respectively. The club finished the league campaign in 19th place with 11 wins, 12 draws and 19 losses – the same tally as their equal-worst performance in the Second Division, which occurred in the 1934–35 season.

=== List of match results ===
| 29 August 1936 1 | Southampton | 3–2 | Chesterfield | Southampton |
| | Holt; Dunne; Smallwood | | | Stadium: The Dell; Attendance: 15,938 |

| 31 August 1936 2 | Doncaster Rovers | 2–0 | Southampton | Doncaster |
| | | | | Stadium: Belle Vue; Attendance: 12,258 |

| 5 September 1936 3 | Aston Villa | 4–0 | Southampton | Birmingham |
| | | | | Stadium: Villa Park; Attendance: 45,000 |

| 7 September 1936 4 | Southampton | 1–0 | Doncaster Rovers | Southampton |
| | Holt | | | Stadium: The Dell; Attendance: 9,306 |

| 12 September 1936 5 | Southampton | 2–0 | Bradford City | Southampton |
| | Holt; Smallwood | | | Stadium: The Dell; Attendance: 9,652 |

| 16 September 1936 6 | Nottingham Forest | 1–1 | Southampton | Nottingham |
| | | | Smallwood | Stadium: City Ground; Attendance: 14,300 |

| 19 September 1936 7 | Swansea Town | 5–1 | Southampton | Swansea |
| | | | Smallwood | Stadium: Vetch Field; Attendance: 10,000 |

| 26 September 1936 8 | Southampton | 4–0 | Sheffield United | Southampton |
| | Dunne; Boyd | | | Stadium: The Dell; Attendance: 15,104 |

| 3 October 1936 9 | Southampton | 1–1 | Burnley | Southampton |
| | Boyd | | | Stadium: The Dell; Attendance: 16,066 |

| 10 October 1936 10 | Fulham | 2–0 | Southampton | London |
| | | | | Stadium: Craven Cottage; Attendance: 18,000 |

| 17 October 1936 11 | Tottenham Hotspur | 4–0 | Southampton | London |
| | | | | Stadium: White Hart Lane; Attendance: 25,000 |

| 24 October 1936 12 | Southampton | 5–2 | Blackpool | Southampton |
| | Summers; Dunne; Smallwood | | | Stadium: The Dell; Attendance: 16,779 |

| 31 October 1936 13 | Blackburn Rovers | 1–0 | Southampton | Blackburn |
| | | | | Stadium: Ewood Park; Attendance: 13,000 |

| 7 November 1936 14 | Southampton | 4–1 | Bury | Southampton |
| | Boyd; Summers; Smallwood | | | Stadium: The Dell; Attendance: 14,471 |

| 14 November 1936 15 | Leicester City | 2–2 | Southampton | Leicester |
| | | | Dunne | Stadium: Filbert Street; Attendance: 10,000 |

| 21 November 1936 16 | Southampton | 0–2 | West Ham United | Southampton |
| | | | | Stadium: The Dell; Attendance: 17,587 |

| 28 November 1936 17 | Norwich City | 4–2 | Southampton | Norwich |
| | | | Dunne; Holt | Stadium: The Nest; Attendance: 11,250 |

| 5 December 1936 18 | Southampton | 2–0 | Newcastle United | Southampton |
| | Whitelaw; Boyd | | | Stadium: The Dell; Attendance: 16,038 |

| 12 December 1936 19 | Bradford | 3–1 | Southampton | Bradford |
| | | | Boyd | Stadium: Park Avenue; Attendance: 8,000 |

| 19 December 1936 20 | Southampton | 1–3 | Barnsley | Southampton |
| | Holt | | | Stadium: The Dell; Attendance: 10,674 |

| 25 December 1936 21 | Coventry City | 2–0 | Southampton | Coventry |
| | | | | Stadium: Highfield Road; Attendance: 32,042 |

| 26 December 1936 22 | Chesterfield | 3–0 | Southampton | Chesterfield |
| | | | | Stadium: Saltergate; Attendance: 12,000 |

| 28 December 1936 23 | Southampton | 1–1 | Coventry City | Southampton |
| | Summers | | | Stadium: The Dell; Attendance: 9,016 |

| 2 January 1937 24 | Southampton | 2–2 | Aston Villa | Southampton |
| | Smallwood | | | Stadium: The Dell; Attendance: 20,853 |

| 9 January 1937 25 | Bradford City | 2–2 | Southampton | Bradford |
| | | | Summers; Dunne | Stadium: Valley Parade; Attendance: 7,000 |

| 23 January 1937 26 | Southampton | 2–1 | Swansea Town | Southampton |
| | Holt; Smallwood | | | Stadium: The Dell; Attendance: 7,123 |

| 6 February 1937 27 | Burnley | 1–3 | Southampton | Burnley |
| | | | Dunne; Holt (o.g.) | Stadium: Turf Moor; Attendance: 11,000 |

| 11 February 1937 28 | Sheffield United | 0–0 | Southampton | Sheffield |
| | | | | Stadium: Bramall Lane; Attendance: 10,327 |

| 13 February 1937 29 | Southampton | 3–3 | Fulham | Southampton |
| | Dunne; Summers | | | Stadium: The Dell; Attendance: 14,317 |

| 24 February 1937 30 | Southampton | 1–0 | Tottenham Hotspur | Southampton |
| | Summers | | | Stadium: The Dell; Attendance: 5,226 |

| 27 February 1937 31 | Blackpool | 2–0 | Southampton | Blackpool |
| | | | | Stadium: Bloomfield Road; Attendance: 11,000 |

| 6 March 1937 32 | Southampton | 2–2 | Blackburn Rovers | Southampton |
| | Kingdon; Holt | | | Stadium: The Dell; Attendance: 14,402 |

| 13 March 1937 33 | Bury | 2–1 | Southampton | Bury |
| | | | Dunne | Stadium: Gigg Lane; Attendance: 8,000 |

| 20 March 1937 34 | Southampton | 1–1 | Leicester City | Southampton |
| | Dunne | | | Stadium: The Dell; Attendance: 13,601 |

| 26 March 1937 35 | Plymouth Argyle | 3–1 | Southampton | Plymouth |
| | | | Holt | Stadium: Home Park; Attendance: 24,000 |

| 27 March 1937 36 | West Ham United | 4–0 | Southampton | London |
| | | | | Stadium: Boleyn Ground; Attendance: 26,000 |

| 29 March 1937 37 | Southampton | 0–0 | Plymouth Argyle | Southampton |
| | | | | Stadium: The Dell; Attendance: 20,007 |

| 3 April 1937 38 | Southampton | 3–1 | Norwich City | Southampton |
| | King; Holt; Smallwood | | | Stadium: The Dell; Attendance: 12,597 |

| 10 April 1937 39 | Newcastle United | 3–0 | Southampton | Newcastle upon Tyne |
| | | | | Stadium: St James' Park; Attendance: 20,000 |

| 17 April 1937 40 | Southampton | 0–0 | Bradford | Southampton |
| | | | | Stadium: The Dell; Attendance: 9,384 |

| 24 April 1937 41 | Barnsley | 2–1 | Southampton | Barnsley |
| | | | Holt | Stadium: Oakwell; Attendance: 7,000 |

| 1 May 1937 42 | Southampton | 0–3 | Nottingham Forest | Southampton |
| | | | | Stadium: The Dell; Attendance: 4,529 |

=== Final league table ===
| Pos | Team | Pld | W | D | L | GF | GA | GAv | Pts | Promotion or relegation |
|---|---|---|---|---|---|---|---|---|---|---|
| 17 | Norwich City | 42 | 14 | 8 | 20 | 63 | 71 | 0.887 | 36 | |
| 18 | Nottingham Forest | 42 | 12 | 10 | 20 | 68 | 90 | 0.756 | 34 | |
| 19 | Southampton | 42 | 11 | 12 | 19 | 53 | 77 | 0.688 | 34 | |
| 20 | Bradford (Park Avenue) | 42 | 12 | 9 | 21 | 52 | 88 | 0.591 | 33 | |
| 21 | Bradford City (R) | 42 | 9 | 12 | 21 | 54 | 94 | 0.574 | 30 | Relegation to the Third Division North |

Source: RSSSF
Rules for classification: 1) Points; 2) Goal average; 3) Goals scored
(R) Relegated

=== Results by matchday ===
| Round | 1 | 2 | 3 | 4 | 5 | 6 | 7 | 8 | 9 | 10 | 11 | 12 | 13 | 14 | 15 | 16 | 17 | 18 | 19 | 20 | 21 | 22 | 23 | 24 | 25 | 26 | 27 | 28 | 29 | 30 | 31 | 32 | 33 | 34 | 35 | 36 | 37 | 38 | 39 | 40 | 41 | 42 |
|---|---|---|---|---|---|---|---|---|---|---|---|---|---|---|---|---|---|---|---|---|---|---|---|---|---|---|---|---|---|---|---|---|---|---|---|---|---|---|---|---|---|---|
| Ground | H | A | A | H | H | A | A | H | H | A | A | H | A | H | A | H | A | H | A | H | A | A | H | H | A | H | A | A | H | H | A | H | A | H | A | A | H | H | A | H | A | H |
| Result | W | L | L | W | W | D | L | W | D | L | L | W | L | W | D | L | L | W | L | L | L | L | D | D | D | W | W | D | D | W | L | D | L | D | L | L | D | W | L | D | L | L |
| Position | 5 | 12 | 19 | 9 | 5 | 7 | 11 | 9 | 11 | 13 | 15 | 11 | 14 | 10 | 10 | 13 | 15 | 12 | 14 | 16 | 18 | 20 | 18 | 19 | 19 | 18 | 15 | 16 | 15 | 15 | 15 | 15 | 15 | 16 | 16 | 18 | 18 | 17 | 18 | 17 | 18 | 19 |

Source: 11v11.com
A = Away; H = Home; W = Win; D = Draw; L = Loss

== FA Cup ==
Southampton entered the 1936–37 FA Cup in the third round against reigning First Division champions Sunderland, hosting the top-flight side in front of a new club record attendance of 30,380. As expected, the Black Cats dominated much of the game and went 2–0 up at half-time, adding another goal just after the break. Despite this, the Saints responded with two goals of their own through Arthur Holt and John Summers, which set up what club historians described as "a nail-biting finalé" in which the home side looked for an equaliser. Sunderland were able to hold onto their lead, however, and saw off their Second Division opponents to advance to the fourth round. Sunderland would ultimately win the 1936–37 FA Cup, beating Third Division South side Luton Town, Swansea Town of the Second Division, fellow First Division club Wolverhampton Wanderers and Millwall of the Third Division South on the way to the final, in which they overcame fellow top-flight side Preston North End 3–1.

| 16 January 1937 Round 3 | Southampton | 2–3 | Sunderland | Southampton |
| | Holt; Summers 79' | | | Stadium: The Dell; Attendance: 30,380 |

== Other matches ==
Aside from the league and the FA Cup, Southampton only played two additional first-team matches in the 1936–37 season. Both were friendly matches against Third Division South clubs – the Saints lost 0–2 to Gillingham in February, followed by a 1–1 draw with Brighton & Hove Albion in April (Arthur Holt scoring the goal for the travelling Saints).

| 20 February 1937 Friendly | Gillingham | 2–0 | Southampton | Gillingham |
| | | | | Stadium: Priestfield Stadium |

| 28 April 1937 Friendly | Brighton & Hove Albion | 1–1 | Southampton | Hove |
| | | | Holt | Stadium: Goldstone Ground |

== Player details ==
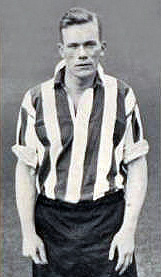
Jimmy Dunne was Southampton's top scorer in 1936–37, with 14 goals in 36 league appearances.

Southampton used 28 different players during the 1936–37 season, eight of whom scored during the campaign. The team played in a 2–3–5 formation throughout, using two full-backs, three half-backs, two outside forwards, two inside forwards and a centre-forward. Left-half Billy Kingdon and right-back Charlie Sillett featured in more games than any other Southampton player, appearing in all but one league game, plus the FA Cup fixture; Arthur Holt, Bert Scriven and Fred Smallwood each played in 40 league games and the FA Cup match. Newly-signed centre-forward Jimmy Dunne finished as the season's top scorer with 14 goals in the Second Division, followed by Holt on 11 league goals and one FA Cup goal.

=== Squad statistics ===
| Name | Pos. | Nat. | League | | FA Cup | | Total | |
| Name | Pos. | Nat. | Apps. | Gls. | Apps. | Gls. | Apps. | Gls. |
|---|---|---|---|---|---|---|---|---|
| Eugene Bernard | GK | (England) | 2 | 0 | 0 | 0 | 2 | 0 |
| Lionel Bowen | FB | (England) | 2 | 0 | 0 | 0 | 2 | 0 |
| Billy Boyd | FW | (Scotland) | 19 | 7 | 0 | 0 | 19 | 7 |
| Tom Brewis | FW | (England) | 3 | 0 | 0 | 0 | 3 | 0 |
| Donovan Browning | FB | (England) | 12 | 0 | 0 | 0 | 12 | 0 |
| Norman Catlin | FW | (England) | 1 | 0 | 0 | 0 | 1 | 0 |
| Alf Charles | FW | (Trinidad and Tobago) | 1 | 0 | 0 | 0 | 1 | 0 |
| Jimmy Dunne | FW | (Republic of Ireland) | 36 | 14 | 1 | 0 | 37 | 14 |
| Sid Gueran | FW | (England) | 1 | 0 | 0 | 0 | 1 | 0 |
| Doug Henderson | FB | (England) | 1 | 0 | 1 | 0 | 2 | 0 |
| Arthur Holt | FW | (England) | 40 | 11 | 1 | 1 | 41 | 12 |
| Bill Kennedy | HB | (Scotland) | 33 | 0 | 0 | 0 | 33 | 0 |
| Cyril King | HB | (England) | 28 | 1 | 1 | 0 | 29 | 1 |
| Billy Kingdon | HB | (England) | 41 | 1 | 1 | 0 | 42 | 1 |
| Henry Long | HB | (England) | 2 | 0 | 0 | 0 | 2 | 0 |
| Bill Luckett | HB | (England) | 1 | 0 | 0 | 0 | 1 | 0 |
| Wilf Mayer | FW | (England) | 9 | 0 | 0 | 0 | 9 | 0 |
| Johnny McIlwaine | HB | (Scotland) | 3 | 0 | 0 | 0 | 3 | 0 |
| Billy Moore | HB | (Wales) | 1 | 0 | 0 | 0 | 1 | 0 |
| Dick Neal | FW | (England) | 20 | 0 | 1 | 0 | 21 | 0 |
| Arthur Roberts | FB | (England) | 29 | 0 | 1 | 0 | 30 | 0 |
| Bert Scriven | GK | (England) | 40 | 0 | 1 | 0 | 41 | 0 |
| Charlie Sillett | FB | (England) | 41 | 0 | 1 | 0 | 42 | 0 |
| Fred Smallwood | FW | (Wales) | 40 | 10 | 1 | 0 | 41 | 10 |
| John Summers | FW | (England) | 28 | 7 | 1 | 1 | 29 | 8 |
| Fred Tully | FW | (England) | 3 | 0 | 0 | 0 | 3 | 0 |
| Bobby Whitelaw | HB | (Scotland) | 19 | 1 | 0 | 0 | 19 | 1 |
| Ted Withers | FW | (England) | 6 | 0 | 0 | 0 | 6 | 0 |

=== Most appearances ===
| Rank | Name | Pos. | League | | FA Cup | | Total | |
| Rank | Name | Pos. | Apps. | % | Apps. | % | Apps. | % |
|---|---|---|---|---|---|---|---|---|
| 1 | Billy Kingdon | HB | 41 | 97.62 | 1 | 100.00 | 42 | 97.67 |
| 1 | Charlie Sillett | FB | 41 | 97.62 | 1 | 100.00 | 42 | 97.67 |
| 3 | Arthur Holt | FW | 40 | 95.24 | 1 | 100.00 | 41 | 95.35 |
| 3 | Bert Scriven | GK | 40 | 95.24 | 1 | 100.00 | 41 | 95.35 |
| 3 | Fred Smallwood | FW | 40 | 95.24 | 1 | 100.00 | 41 | 95.35 |
| 6 | Jimmy Dunne | FW | 36 | 85.71 | 1 | 100.00 | 37 | 86.05 |
| 7 | Bill Kennedy | HB | 33 | 78.57 | 0 | 0.00 | 33 | 76.74 |
| 8 | Arthur Roberts | FB | 29 | 69.05 | 1 | 100.00 | 30 | 69.77 |
| 9 | Cyril King | HB | 28 | 66.67 | 1 | 100.00 | 29 | 67.44 |
| 9 | John Summers | FW | 28 | 66.67 | 1 | 100.00 | 29 | 67.44 |

=== Top goalscorers ===
| Rank | Name | Pos. | League | | FA Cup | | Total | |
| Rank | Name | Pos. | Gls. | GPG | Gls. | GPG | Gls. | GPG |
|---|---|---|---|---|---|---|---|---|
| 1 | Jimmy Dunne | FW | 14 | 0.39 | 0 | 0.00 | 14 | 0.38 |
| 2 | Arthur Holt | FW | 11 | 0.28 | 1 | 1.00 | 12 | 0.29 |
| 3 | Fred Smallwood | FW | 10 | 0.25 | 0 | 0.00 | 10 | 0.24 |
| 4 | John Summers | FW | 7 | 0.25 | 1 | 1.00 | 8 | 0.28 |
| 5 | Billy Boyd | FW | 7 | 0.37 | 0 | 0.00 | 7 | 0.37 |
| 6 | Bobby Whitelaw | HB | 1 | 0.05 | 0 | 0.00 | 1 | 0.05 |
| 6 | Cyril King | HB | 1 | 0.04 | 0 | 0.00 | 1 | 0.03 |
| 6 | Billy Kingdon | HB | 1 | 0.02 | 0 | 0.00 | 1 | 0.02 |

== Bibliography ==
- Chalk, Gary; Holley, Duncan (10 August 1987), A Complete Record of Southampton Football Club: 1885–1987, Derby, England: Breedon Books, ISBN 978-0907969228
- Chalk, Gary; Holley, Duncan; Bull, David (28 November 2013), All the Saints: A Complete Who's Who of Southampton FC, Bristol, England: Hagiology Publishing, ISBN 978-0992686406
- Juson, Dave; Aldworth, Clay; Bendel, Barry; Bull, David; Chalk, Gary (10 November 2004), Saints v Pompey: A History of Unrelenting Rivalry, Bristol, England: Hagiology Publishing, ISBN 978-0953447459
