= Dunne =

Origin
- Origin: Gaelic
- Meaning: "dark" or "brown"
- Region of origin: Ireland

Other names
- Variant forms: Dunn, O'Dunne, O'Dunn

Dunne or Dunn is an Irish surname, derived from the Irish Ó Duinn and Ó Doinn, meaning "dark" or "brown." The name Dunne in Ireland is derived from the Ó Duinn (Pronounced O Dinn) and the Ó Doinn Gaelic septs who were based in County Laois, County Meath and County Wicklow. These septs in turn are descendants of the O'Regan noble family. It is in these counties that the majority of descendants can still be found. Hundreds of years ago, the Gaelic name used by the Dunn family in Ireland was Ó Duinn or Ó Doinn. Both Gaelic names are derived from the Gaelic word donn, which means "brown". Ó Doinn is the genitive case of donn. First found in county Meath, where they held a family seat from very ancient times. Variations: Dunn, Dunne, Dun, Duen, O'Dunne, O'Doyne, Doine, Doin, O'Dunn.

According to historian C. Thomas Cairney, the O'Dunnes were one of the chiefly families of the Ui Failghe who in turn were a tribe from the Dumnonii or Laigin who were the third wave of Celts to settle in Ireland during the first century BC.

== Dunne Castles ==
The Dunnes formerly owned a number of castles in the midlands of Ireland. Today little remains of most of these castles, many were destroyed during the Cromwellian Invasion of Ireland.

=== Tinnahinch Castle ===
The principal seat of the Dunne family was Tinnahinch Castle. Originally known as "Baun Riaganach", the castle was built by Tadhg MacLaighnigh Ui Duinn in 1475 and was the residence of the chief of the Dunne's. Tinnahinch Castle was located at the Barrow River, one mile south of Tinnahinch bridge. The name Tinnahinch originally means "house of the island", a tributary stream of the Barrow river surrounding the castle gives it the appearance of an island. Tinnahinch Castle was destroyed during the Cromwellian Invasion by forces led by Colonel John Hewson in 1653. At the time it was strongly defended by Charles Dunne and it required a full park of artillery from the invading forces to level the castle. After the destruction of Tinnahinch Castle the principal seat of the Dunne family moved to Brittas Castle. Unfortunately there remains nothing of the original castle apart from a wall which may have been part of the original building.

=== Brittas Castle ===
After the destruction of Tinnahinch Castle the Dunne Chief built a new home at Brittas, near Clonaslee, County Laois. Originally there was a thatched lodge located there and the O'Duinns built a mansion at his location. In 1869, Major-General Francis Plunkett Dunne built a neo-gothic mansion at this location. The house had extensive gardens and also lake which was originally created as a reservoir. In 1942 the building was burned down in a fire.

=== Ballinakill Castle ===
It was a coursed rubble and limestone building built between the River Clodiagh and River Gorragh by the Dunnes on the location of an earlier castle which was destroyed by Cromwellian invasion forces. It was built by Colonel Terence O'Dunne in 1680 who was killed at the Battle of Aughrim and is buried at the graveyard in Killeigh.

=== Coolnamoney Castle ===
Teige O'Doyne built the Dunne castle Coolnamoney Lower near the Glenlahan River. Not much is left of the castle today, but some of the original features can be seen in the ruins.

=== Castlebrack Castle ===
Castlebrack Castle was built by Tadhg MacLaighnigh Ui Duinn in 1475. It was built to be occupied by the Tanist, which was the name of the position held by the clan's deputy chief. This castle was second in size and importance to Tinnahinch Castle, which was the principal residence of the Dunnes. Terence O'Dunne completed a major refurbishment of the castle in 1688, however by 1838, all that was left of the castle was ruins.

=== Clarahill Castle ===
Clarahill Castle was built by a junior/younger branch of the Dunne family. It was built in 1600, and in 1900 it was destroyed for road material.

=== Ballinahemmy Castle ===
The Dunnes also built Ballinahemmy Castle near the town of Corrigeen, in County Laois, and its location is marked on the Ordnance Survey map.

=== Raskeen Castle ===
Raskeen Castle was built by Donal O'Dunne in 1584 and destroyed in 1691.

== Notable people with the surname Dunne ==
- Alex Dunne (born 2005), Irish racing driver
- Ben Dunne (1908–1983), Irish entrepreneur and former director of Dunnes Stores
- Benny Dunne (born 1980), Irish hurler
- Bobby Dunne (1949–1992), Australian boxer
- Bernard Dunne (born 1980), Irish boxer
- Colin Dunne (born 1968), Irish dancer
- Conor Dunne (born 1992), Irish cyclist, brother of Katy
- Cyril Dunne (1941–2024), Irish footballer
- David Dunne (born 1995), Irish hurler
- Dominick Dunne (1925–2009), American writer and investigative journalist
- Dominique Dunne (1959–1982), American actress, daughter of Dominick
- Edmund Francis Dunne (1835–1904), Chief Justice of the Arizona Territory, founder of San Antonio, Florida
- Edmund Michael Dunne (1864–1929), American prelate of the Roman Catholic Church and Bishop of Peoria
- Edward Fitzsimmons Dunne (1853–1937), American politician
- Edward Joseph Dunne (1848–1910), Irish-born prelate of the Roman Catholic Church and Bishop of Dallas
- Emmett Dunne (born 1956), Australian footballer
- Finley Peter Dunne (1867–1936), American author, writer and humorist
- Lawrence Francis "Frank" Dunne (1898–1937), Australian cartoonist
- Francis Charlton "Diver" Dunne (1875–1937), Australian footballer
- Gordon Dunne (1959–2021), Northern Irish politician
- Griffin Dunne (born 1955), American actor and film director, son of Dominick
- Hannah Dunne (born 1990), American actress, daughter of Griffin
- Irene Dunne (1898–1990), American actress
- Lady Jasmine Dunne (born 1973)
- J. W. Dunne (1875–1949), Irish born inventor and philosopher
- Jeff Dunne (footballer) (1956–2020), Australian footballer
- James E. Dunne (1882–1942), mayor of Providence 1927–1939
- Jimmy Dunne (footballer, born 1905) (1905–1949), Irish footballer
- Jimmy Dunne (footballer born 1935), Irish footballer, son of Jimmy (born 1905)
- Jimmy Dunne (footballer born 1947), Irish footballer
- Joe Dunne (born 1973), Irish footballer
- John Dunne (disambiguation), multiple people
- Josh Dunne (born 1998), American ice hockey player
- Karen Dunne (born 1967), American track and road cyclist
- Katy Dunne, (born 1995), British tennis player, sister of Conor
- Liam Dunne (footballer) (born 1971), Irish footballer
- Liam Dunne (born 1968), Irish hurler
- Louisa Dunne (1892–1967), English murder victim
- Martin Dunne (English footballer) (1887–unknown), English footballer
- Michael Dunne (disambiguation), multiple people
- Olivia "Livvy" Dunne (born 2002), American gymnast and internet personality
- Paddy Dunne (Gaelic footballer)
- Paddy Dunne (politician) (1928–2006), Irish politician
- Pat Dunne (1943–2015), Irish football goalkeeper
- Patrick Dunne (priest) (1818–1900), Irish priest active in Australia
- Pete Dunne, wrestler
- Peter Dunne (born 1954), New Zealand politician
- Philip Russell Rendel Dunne (1904–1965), Northern Irish politician
- Philip Dunne (writer) (1908–1992), Hollywood screenwriter and director
- Philip Dunne (Ludlow politician) (born 1958), British politician
- Philippa Dunne, Irish actress and writer
- Reginald Dunne, Irish Republican Army assassin
- Richard Dunne (born 1979), Irish footballer
- Robin Dunne (born 1976), Canadian actor
- Ross Dunne (born 1948), Australian footballer
- Seamus Dunne (1930–2016), Irish footballer
- Seán Dunne (politician) (1918–1969), Irish politician
- Stephen Dunne (actor) (1918–1977), American actor
- Tal Dunne (born 1987), Irish-Israeli basketball player
- Thomas Dunne (disambiguation), multiple people
- Thomas L. Dunne (born 1946), American publisher
- Tom Dunne, musician and Irish radio DJ
- Tommy Dunne (footballer born 1927) (1927–1988), Irish footballer
- Tommy Dunne (footballer born 1972), Irish footballer
- Tommy Dunne (born 1974), Irish hurler
- Tony Dunne (1941–2020), Irish footballer
- Veronica Dunne (singer) (1927–2021), Irish singer and teacher

== Other ==
- I Am Mary Dunne, novel
- Dunnes Stores
- Thomas Dunne Books
- Dunne-za

== See also ==
- Dunn (surname)
- Donne
- Irish clans
