= Bobby Whitelaw =

Scottish footballer

Personal information
- Full name: Robert Whitelaw
- Date of birth: 5 March 1903
- Place of birth: Stonehouse, South Lanarkshire, Scotland
- Date of death: 1965 (aged 61–62)
- Place of death: Kidderminster, Worcestershire, England
- Height: 5 ft 8 in (1.73 m)
- Position: Half back

Youth career
- Larkhall Thistle

Senior career*
| Years | Team | Apps | (Gls) |
| 1926–1930 | Doncaster Rovers | 31 | (1) |
| 1930–1932 | Celtic | 17 | (0) |
| 1931 | → Albion Rovers (loan) | | |
| 1932–1933 | Bournemouth & Boscombe Athletic | 10 | (2) |
| 1933 | Glentoran | | |
| 1933–1934 | Queen of the South | | |
| 1934 | Celtic | – | (–) |
- Cowdenbeath
- Albion Rovers
- Glentoran
| 1936–1937 | Southampton | 20 | (1) |
| 1937–19?? | Kidderminster Harriers | | |
- * Club domestic league appearances and goals

Robert Whitelaw (5 March 1903 – 1965) was a Scottish professional footballer who played as a half back for various clubs in Scotland, England and Northern Ireland in the 1920s and 1930s.

== Football career ==
Whitelaw was born in Stonehouse, South Lanarkshire and first played junior football with local club, Larkhall Thistle.

In July 1926, he moved to England to join Doncaster Rovers of the Football League Third Division North, where he remained for four years, making 31 league appearances, scoring once.

Whitelaw returned to his native Scotland in August 1930 to join Celtic. He made his debut in a 0–0 draw away to Hamilton Academical on 13 September. Described as "a whole-hearted 90 minutes player", he was mainly used as cover for Chic Geatons. Whitelaw remained at Parkhead until June 1932, when he moved to the south coast of England to join Bournemouth, of the Football League Third Division South.

The following summer, he moved to Northern Ireland to join Glentoran, but he was soon back in Scotland with Queen of the South before returning to Celtic in 1934. After a very short time, he was again on the move spending time with Cowdenbeath, Albion Rovers and back at Glentoran before returning to the south coast of England, to join Second Division Southampton in May 1936.

Whitelaw was signed by Southampton's new manager George Goss as a replacement for the recently retired Stan Woodhouse. His debut for the Saints came on 5 September 1936, in the first Second Division match played at Villa Park, which ended in a 4–0 defeat. Whitelaw retained his place at right-half in the Southampton team, where he combined well with fellow half-backs, Bill Kennedy and Billy Kingdon, until December when he lost his place to Cyril King. Although he made one further appearance at the end of the season, he was not offered a new contract and left the club in May 1937, winding up his career at non-league Kidderminster Harriers.

== Later career ==
During the Second World War, he was engaged as an interpreter for military intelligence. He subsequently became an hotelier in Kidderminster.
