= Thomas Dunne =

Thomas Dunne may refer to:

- Thomas Dunne (Irish politician) (1926–1990), Irish Fine Gael politician and Member of the European Parliament
- Thomas Dunne (Lord Lieutenant) (1933–2025), Lord Lieutenant of Herefordshire in the United Kingdom
- Tommy Dunne (born 1974), Irish hurler
- Thomas Griffin Dunne (born 1955), known as Griffin Dunne, American actor and film director
- Tom Dunne, Irish radio disc jockey
- Tom Dunne (hurler) (1863–?), Irish hurler
- Tom Dunne (footballer) (1906–1983), Australian rules footballer
- Tommy Dunne (footballer, born 1927) (1927–1988), former Irish footballer
- Tommy Dunne (footballer, born 1932) (1932–2015), former Irish international footballer
- Tommy Dunne (footballer, born 1946) (1946–2001), Scottish former footballer
- Tommy Dunne (footballer, born 1972), former footballer and manager
- Thomas L. Dunne (born 1946), American publisher
- Thomas Dunne (geologist) (born 1943), American geologist
- Tommy Dunne (Gaelic footballer), former Laois Gaelic footballer

== See also ==
- Thomas Dunne Books, British book publisher and division of St Martin's Press
- Thomas Dunn (disambiguation)
