= Trinidad and Tobago national football team results (1905–1959) =

- Win Draw Loss

The Trinidad and Tobago national football team represents Trinidad and Tobago in association football and is controlled by the Trinidad and Tobago Football Association (TTFA), the governing body of the sport in the country.

The team's largest victory that came between 1905 and 1959 was when they defeated Puerto Rico 7–0 on 11 May 1949. Their worst loss between 1905 and 1959 was a 5–0 defeat from Haiti on 25 April 1949.

During this period, the Soca Warriors toured neighboring Caribbean nations and played in many friendly tournaments and series.

== Results ==
=== 1905 ===
21 June 1905 Friendly	British Guiana	1–4	Trinidad and Tobago	British Guiana
	? (?)	Report	? (?)
Note: This was the first official match for Trinidad and Tobago and British Guiana

=== 1923 ===
22 October 1923 1923 Martinez Shield	Trinidad and Tobago	0–0	British Guiana	Port of Spain, Trinidad and Tobago
		Report		Stadium: Queen's Park Savannah
Note: This was the first official match under the TTFA.

24 October 1923 1923 Martinez Shield	Trinidad and Tobago	3–0	British Guiana	Port of Spain, Trinidad and Tobago
	? (?)	Report		Stadium: Queen's Park Savannah

27 October 1923 1923 Martinez Shield	Trinidad and Tobago	1–0	British Guiana	Port of Spain, Trinidad and Tobago
	? (?)	Report		Stadium: Queen's Park Savannah

=== 1925 ===
9 February 1925 1925 Martinez Shield	British Guiana	1–3	Trinidad and Tobago	Georgetown, British Guiana
	? (?)	Report	? (?)	Stadium: Bourda

13 February 1925 1925 Martinez Shield	British Guiana	2–1	Trinidad and Tobago	Georgetown, British Guiana
	? (?)	Report	? (?)	Stadium: Bourda

16 February 1925 1925 Martinez Shield	British Guiana	0–1	Trinidad and Tobago	Georgetown, British Guiana
		Report	? (?)	Stadium: Bourda

=== 1926 ===
23 October 1926 1926 Martinez Shield	Trinidad and Tobago	1–1	British Guiana	Port of Spain, Trinidad and Tobago
	? (?)	Report	? (?)	Stadium: Queen's Park Savannah

30 October 1926 1926 Martinez Shield	Trinidad and Tobago	1–0	British Guiana	Port of Spain, Trinidad and Tobago
	? (?)	Report		Stadium: Queen's Park Savannah

6 November 1926 1926 Martinez Shield	Trinidad and Tobago	3–0	British Guiana	Port of Spain, Trinidad and Tobago
	? (?)	Report		Stadium: Queen's Park Savannah

=== 1928 ===
16 March 1928 1928 Martinez Shield	British Guiana	1–1	Trinidad and Tobago	Georgetown, British Guiana
	? (?)	Report	? (?)	Stadium: Pln Thomas

21 March 1928 1928 Martinez Shield	British Guiana	0–0	Trinidad and Tobago	Georgetown, British Guiana
		Report		Stadium: Pln Thomas

28 March 1928 1928 Martinez Shield	British Guiana	0–1	Trinidad and Tobago	Georgetown, British Guiana
		Report	? (?)	Stadium: Pln Thomas

=== 1929 ===
20 April 1929 Friendly	Barbados	3–0	Trinidad and Tobago	Barbados
	McIntosh (?) (?); Emprage (?)	Report
Note: This was the first official match for Barbados.

22 April 1929 Friendly	Barbados	2–0	Trinidad and Tobago	Barbados
	Ashby (?) (?)	Report

24 April 1929 Friendly	Barbados	2–1	Trinidad and Tobago	Barbados
	Sharpe (?) (?)	Report	E. Achong (?)

26 October 1929 1929 Martinez Shield	Trinidad and Tobago	0–0	British Guiana	Port of Spain, Trinidad and Tobago
		Report		Stadium: Queen's Park Savannah

2 November 1929 1929 Martinez Shield	Trinidad and Tobago	0–1	British Guiana	Port of Spain, Trinidad and Tobago
		Report	? (?)	Stadium: Queen's Park Savannah

9 November 1929 1929 Martinez Shield	Trinidad and Tobago	3–1	British Guiana	Port of Spain, Trinidad and Tobago
	? (?)	Report	? (?)	Stadium: Queen's Park Savannah
Note: Trinidad and Tobago and British Guiana were tied at neutral points. (1W, 1D, 1P). A replay was done to determine the winner.

11 November 1929 1929 Martinez Shield 1st replay	Trinidad and Tobago	1–1 (a.e.t.)	British Guiana	Port of Spain, Trinidad and Tobago
	? (?)	Report	? (?)	Stadium: Queen's Park Savannah
Note: Due to the draw, a second replay was scheduled.

13 November 1929 1929 Martinez Shield 2nd replay	Trinidad and Tobago	0–1	British Guiana	Port of Spain, Trinidad and Tobago
		Report	? (?)	Stadium: Queen's Park Savannah

=== 1931 ===
9 March 1931 1931 Martinez Shield	Trinidad and Tobago	7–1	Barbados	Georgetown, British Guiana
	H. Achong (?) (?) (?) (?); A. Daniel (?); W. Brown (?); L. Carter (?)	Report	L. Gittens (?)	Stadium: Pln Thomas

11 March 1931 1931 Martinez Shield	British Guiana	1–1	Trinidad and Tobago	Georgetown, British Guiana
	M. Nascimiento (?)	Report	H. Achong (?)	Stadium: Pln Thomas

16 March 1931 1931 Martinez Shield	Trinidad and Tobago	5–1	Barbados	Georgetown, British Guiana
	S.E. Agostini (?); H. Achong (?); A. Halfide (?); L. Carter (?); E. Thompson (?)	Report	? (?)	Stadium: Pln Thomas

18 March 1931 1931 Martinez Shield	British Guiana	2–0	Trinidad and Tobago	Georgetown, British Guiana
	R.E. Weekes (pen.); O.T. Donald (?)	Report		Stadium: Pln Thomas

=== 1932 ===
14 April 1932 1932 Martinez Shield	Trinidad and Tobago	0–1	British Guiana	Bridgetown, Barbados
		Report	Lovell (?)	Stadium: Kensington Oval

18 April 1932 1932 Martinez Shield	Barbados	1–0	Trinidad and Tobago	Bridgetown, Barbados
	Sealy (pen.)	Report		Stadium: Kensington Oval

21 April 1932 1932 Martinez Shield	Trinidad and Tobago	2–1	British Guiana	Bridgetown, Barbados
	H. Achong (pen.); Al. Charles (?)	Report	Small (?)	Stadium: Kensington Oval

26 April 1932 1932 Martinez Shield	Barbados	1–3	Trinidad and Tobago	Bridgetown, Barbados
	Sealy (?)	Report	Al. Charles (?) (?); H. Achong (?)	Stadium: Kensington Oval

=== 1933 ===
24 October 1933 Friendly	Trinidad and Tobago	2–0	British Guiana	Port of Spain, Trinidad and Tobago
	Lewis (?); ? (o.g.)	Report		Stadium: Queen's Park Oval

28 October 1933 1933 Martinez Shield	Trinidad and Tobago	1–1	British Guiana	Port of Spain, Trinidad and Tobago
	Bradshaw (?)	Report	Mittelhozer (?)	Stadium: Queen's Park Oval

30 October 1933 1933 Martinez Shield	Trinidad and Tobago	3–1	Barbados	Port of Spain, Trinidad and Tobago
	Alkins (?); G. McClure (?); S. Foster (o.g.)	Report	L. Foster (?)	Stadium: Queen's Park Oval; Referee: Mervyn Creel (Trinidad and Tobago)

4 November 1933 1933 Martinez Shield	Trinidad and Tobago	1–0	British Guiana	Port of Spain, Trinidad and Tobago
	Lewis (?)	Report		Stadium: Queen's Park Oval

6 November 1933 1933 Martinez Shield	Trinidad and Tobago	6–0	Barbados	Port of Spain, Trinidad and Tobago
	Alkins (?) (?); Wilkinson (?); Daniel (?); Lewis (?); Bradshaw (?)	Report		Stadium: Queen's Park Oval

=== 1934 ===
6 August 1934 Friendly	Suriname	3–3	Trinidad and Tobago	Paramaribo, Suriname
	? (?)	Report	Almandez (?); ? (?)

=== 1935 ===
1935 Friendly	Suriname	0–3	Trinidad and Tobago	Paramaribo, Suriname
		Report	? (?)

30 May 1935 Friendly	Trinidad and Tobago	3–1	Curaçao	Trinidad and Tobago
	? (?)	Report	? (?)

15 December 1935 Friendly	Curaçao	3–1	Trinidad and Tobago	Curaçao
16:30 UTC−4	? 20', 35' (pen.) (?)	Report	? (pen.)	Attendance: 3,000

28 December 1935 Friendly	Jamaica	2–3	Trinidad and Tobago	Kingston, Jamaica
16:15 UTC−5	Parke (?); da Costa (?)	Report	Payne 1', 53'; L. Henderson 28'	Stadium: Sabina Park; Referee: Mike Hanna

=== 1936 ===
4 January 1936 Friendly	Jamaica	0–1	Trinidad and Tobago	Kingston, Jamaica
		Report	Alkins (?)	Stadium: Sabina Park

11 January 1936 Friendly	Jamaica	1–2	Trinidad and Tobago	Kingston, Jamaica
	Sasso 20'	Report	Sutherland (?) (?)	Stadium: Sabina Park

30 January 1936 Friendly	Curaçao	4–2	Trinidad and Tobago
	? (?)	Report	? (?)

February 1936 Friendly	Jamaica	0–3	Trinidad and Tobago	Port of Spain, Trinidad and Tobago
		Report	V. Stollmeyer (?) (?) (?)

=== 1937 ===
5 January 1937 Toernooi ter Ere van Huwelijk Juliana en Bernhard 1937	Trinidad and Tobago	3–0	British Guiana	Paramaribo, Suriname
	Lovell (o.g.); Sutherland (>45) (>45)	Report		Stadium: Cultuurtuin

6 January 1937 Toernooi ter Ere van Huwelĳk Juliana en Bernhard 1937	Suriname	1–1	Trinidad and Tobago	Paramaribo, Suriname
	Hu. Landkoer (<45)	Report	Henderson (<45)	Stadium: Cultuurtuin

8 February 1937 Toernooi ter Ere van Huwelĳk Juliana en Bernhard 1937	British Guiana	Cancelled	Trinidad and Tobago	Paramaribo, Suriname
		Report		Stadium: Cultuurtuin
Note: Originally, all teams were going to play 4 matches in a double round-robin format. However, after British Guiana suffered two defeats, the tournament continued as a playoff between Trinidad and Tobago and Suriname.

8 January 1937 Toernooi ter Ere van Huwelĳk Juliana en Bernhard 1937	Suriname	3–3	Trinidad and Tobago	Paramaribo, Suriname
	He. Landkoer (<45); Nelom (>45); Naloop (>45)	Report	N.N. (<45); Daniels (<45); Monkou Jr. (o.g.)	Stadium: Cultuurtuin

9 January 1937 Toernooi ter Ere van Huwelĳk Juliana en Bernhard 1937	Suriname	2–2	Trinidad and Tobago	Paramaribo, Suriname
	Nahar (<45) (>45)	Report	Holband (o.g.); N.N. (>45)	Stadium: Cultuurtuin

11 January 1937 Friendly	British Guiana	0–3	Trinidad and Tobago	Georgetown, British Guiana
		Report	? (?)

=== 1938 ===
31 March 1938 Suriname Tournament 1938	British Guiana	1–1	Trinidad and Tobago	Paramaribo, Suriname
	? (?)	Report	? (?)

1 April 1938 Suriname Tournament 1938	Trinidad and Tobago	3–0	British Guiana	Paramaribo, Suriname
	Burnett (?) (?); Galt 25'	Report

3 April 1938 Suriname Tournament 1938	Suriname	0–1	Trinidad and Tobago	Paramaribo, Suriname
		Report	? (?)

4 April 1938 Suriname Tournament 1938	Suriname	3–0	Trinidad and Tobago	Paramaribo, Suriname
	? (?)	Report

5 April 1938 Suriname Tournament 1938	Trinidad and Tobago	2–0	British Guiana	Paramaribo, Suriname
	? (?)	Report

8 April 1938 Suriname Tournament 1938	Suriname	1–0	Trinidad and Tobago	Paramaribo, Suriname
	? (?)	Report

16 July 1938 Friendly	Trinidad and Tobago	1–2	Suriname	Trinidad and Tobago
	Galt 16'	Report	? (?)

=== 1942 ===
11 April 1942 Friendly	Barbados	3–3	Trinidad and Tobago	Barbados
	? (?)	Report	? (?)

=== 1944 ===
1944 Friendly	Trinidad and Tobago	5–0	Barbados	Trinidad and Tobago
	? (?)	Report

4 May 1944 Friendly	Barbados	1–1	Trinidad and Tobago	Fontabelle, Barbados
	Robinson 3'	Report	Govia 53'	Stadium: Kensington Oval; Referee: H. Thomas (Barbados)

8 May 1944 Friendly	Barbados	1–1	Trinidad and Tobago	Fontabelle, Barbados
	M. Foster (pen.)	Report	R. Burnett 29'	Stadium: Kensington Oval; Referee: Herman Griffith (Trinidad and Tobago)

10 May 1944 Friendly	Barbados	1–4	Trinidad and Tobago	Fontabelle, Barbados
	Warner (o.g.)	Report	Ah. Charles 28', 28'; Thompson (?); R. Burnett (?)	Stadium: Kensington Oval; Referee: Sergeant McQueen

4 October 1944 1944 Triangular	Trinidad and Tobago	1–1	British Guiana	Trinidad and Tobago
	Ah. Charles (?)	Report	Vangenderen (?)

5 October 1944 1944 Triangular	Trinidad and Tobago	3–0	Barbados	Trinidad and Tobago
	Sealy 46'; J. Stollmeyer 80'; Alkins 85'	Report

9 October 1944 1944 Triangular	Trinidad and Tobago	6–1	Barbados	Trinidad and Tobago
	Sealey (?) (?) (?); Alkins (?); R. Burnett (?) (?)	Report	Williams (?)

13 October 1944 1944 Triangular	Trinidad and Tobago	3–0	British Guiana	Trinidad and Tobago
	Sealey (?); Ah. Charles (?); McLean (?)	Report

=== 1947 ===
11 February 1947 Friendly	Jamaica	0–0	Trinidad and Tobago	Kingston, Jamaica
		Report		Stadium: Sabina Park

15 February 1947 Friendly	Trinidad and Tobago	1–2	Jamaica	Kingston, Jamaica
	C. Lewis 33'	Report	Smith (?); Morris (?)	Stadium: Sabina Park

19 February 1947 Friendly	Jamaica	1–0	Trinidad and Tobago	Kingston, Jamaica
	McMorris (?)	Report		Stadium: Sabina Park

22 February 1947 Friendly	Jamaica	1–2	Trinidad and Tobago	Kingston, Jamaica
	McMorris (?)	Report	Lynch (?); Ganteaume (?)	Stadium: Sabina Park

26 February 1947 Friendly	Barbados	0–6	Trinidad and Tobago	Kingston, Jamaica
		Report	Galt 3', 8'; Gomez 6'; P. Lewis 27'; Winn (?); Lynch (?)	Stadium: Sabina Park; Attendance: 12,000

1 March 1947 Friendly	Curaçao	3–0	Trinidad and Tobago	Willemstad, Territory of Curaçao
	Hato (?); ? (?)	Report		Stadium: Rif Stadium; Referee: Walter Van Rosberg (Curaçao)

2 March 1947 Friendly	Curaçao	4–0	Trinidad and Tobago	Willemstad, Territory of Curaçao
	? (?)	Report		Stadium: Rif Stadium

3 November 1947 Friendly	Trinidad and Tobago	1–0	Jamaica	San Fernando, Trinidad and Tobago
	? (?)	Report		Stadium: Skinner Park

5 November 1947 Standard Life	Trinidad and Tobago	1–2	British Guiana	Port of Spain, Trinidad and Tobago
	White (pen.)	Report	Thompson (?); Parsons (o.g.)	Stadium: Queen's Park Savannah; Attendance: 10,000; Referee: Warrant officer Ewin

8 November 1947 Standard Life	Trinidad and Tobago	6–0	Jamaica	Port of Spain, Trinidad and Tobago
	Hinds (?) (?); Blake 18', 46'; Lynch 48'; Baird (?)	Report		Stadium: Queen's Park Savannah; Referee: Victor Richardson

12 November 1947 Standard Life	Trinidad and Tobago	1–0	Jamaica	San Fernando, Trinidad and Tobago
	Blake (?)	Report		Stadium: Skinner Park

14 November 1947 Standard Life	Trinidad and Tobago	2–0	British Guiana	Port of Spain, Trinidad and Tobago
	Douglin (?) (?)	Report		Stadium: Queen's Park Savannah

=== 1948 ===
1948 Friendly	Jamaica	2–1	Trinidad and Tobago	Kingston, Jamaica
	? (?)	Report	? (?)

1948 Friendly	Jamaica	1–3	Trinidad and Tobago	Kingston, Jamaica
	? (?)	Report	? (?)

10 January 1948 Friendly	Trinidad and Tobago	1–1	Saint Vincent and the Grenadines	Kingstown, Saint Vincent and the Grenadines
	? (?)	Report	? (?)

11 January 1948 1948 Prudent Cup	Trinidad and Tobago	2–2	Saint Vincent and the Grenadines	Kingstown, Saint Vincent and the Grenadines
	? (?)	Report	? (?)

12 January 1948 1948 Prudent Cup	Trinidad and Tobago	2–1	Saint Vincent and the Grenadines	Kingstown, Saint Vincent and the Grenadines
	? (?)	Report	? (?)

12 March 1948 Friendly	Suriname	1–0	Trinidad and Tobago	Paramaribo, Surinam
	? (?)	Report

14 March 1948 Friendly	Suriname	0–0	Trinidad and Tobago	Paramaribo, Suriname
		Report

16 March 1948 Friendly	Suriname	0–2	Trinidad and Tobago	Paramaribo, Suriname
		Report	Charleau (pen.); Munroe (?)

23 October 1948 Friendly	Trinidad and Tobago	0–0	Haiti	Trinidad and Tobago
		Report

27 October 1948 Friendly	Trinidad and Tobago	4–0	Haiti	Trinidad and Tobago
	Munroe (?) (?); Hinds (?); Burnett (?)	Report

30 October 1948 Friendly	Trinidad and Tobago	4–0	Haiti	Trinidad and Tobago
	? (?)	Report

=== 1949 ===
20 April 1949 Friendly	Haiti	2–2	Trinidad and Tobago	Port-au-Prince, Haiti
	Zamor 20'; Tassy 56'	Report	Espinal 25'; Carr 68'

23 April 1949 Friendly	Haiti	2–3	Trinidad and Tobago	Port-au-Prince, Haiti
	Pierre 4', 75'	Report	Espinal 7'; Charleau 26' (pen.); Carr 89'

25 April 1949 Friendly	Haiti	5–0	Trinidad and Tobago	Port-au-Prince, Haiti
	Tassy (pen.) (?) (?); Pierre (?) (?)	Report

2 May 1949 Friendly	Jamaica	3–1	Trinidad and Tobago	Kingston, Jamaica
	Coy (?) (?); McLean (?)	Report	R. Burnett 65'	Stadium: Sabina Park; Attendance: 8,000; Referee: J. M. Groves

4 May 1949 Friendly	Jamaica	2–1	Trinidad and Tobago	Kingston, Jamaica
	Coy (?); Alcock 44'	Report	Espinal (?)	Stadium: Sabina Park; Referee: J. M. Groves

7 May 1949 Friendly	Jamaica	1–2	Trinidad and Tobago	Kingston, Jamaica
	? (?)	Report	Hinds (?); Munroe (?)	Stadium: Sabina Park

10 May 1949 Friendly	Puerto Rico	2–8	Trinidad and Tobago	San Juan, Puerto Rico
	? (?)	Report	? (?)	Stadium: Estadio Sixto Escobar

11 May 1949 Friendly	Puerto Rico	0–7	Trinidad and Tobago	San Juan, Puerto Rico
		Report	? (?)	Stadium: Estadio Sixto Escobar

1 July 1949 Friendly	Martinique	2–0	Trinidad and Tobago	Fort-de-France, Martinique
	Agnes (?); Yang Ting (?)	Report

=== 1950 ===
22 March 1950 Friendly	British Guiana	0–1	Trinidad and Tobago	Georgetown, British Guiana
		Report	Munroe 43'	Stadium: Bourda

24 March 1950 Friendly	British Guiana	1–4	Trinidad and Tobago	Georgetown, British Guiana
	Caetano (?)	Report	Carr 22'; Charleau 62' (pen.); Douglin 64'; C. Lewis 65'	Stadium: Bourda

27 March 1950 Friendly	British Guiana	1–0	Trinidad and Tobago	Georgetown, British Guiana
	Marks (?)	Report		Stadium: Bourda

29 March 1950 Friendly	British Guiana	1–2	Trinidad and Tobago	Georgetown, British Guiana
	Parsons (o.g.)	Report	Hinds 20'; C. Lewis 59'	Stadium: Bourda

31 March 1950 Friendly	British Guiana	1–3	Trinidad and Tobago	Georgetown, British Guiana
	Thomas 2'	Report	Douglin 4', 9', 24'	Stadium: Bourda

23 November 1950 Friendly	Trinidad and Tobago	3–2	Curaçao	Port of Spain, Trinidad and Tobago
	Carr (?) (?); C. Lewis (?)	Report	? (?)

25 November 1950 Friendly	Trinidad and Tobago	5–0	Suriname	Port of Spain, Trinidad and Tobago
	Carr (?) (?) (?); Hinds (?); R. Burnett (?)	Report

30 November 1950 Friendly	Trinidad and Tobago	1–1	Suriname	Port of Spain, Trinidad and Tobago
	Carr (?)	Report	? (?)

4 December 1950 Friendly	Trinidad and Tobago	5–1	Curaçao	Port of Spain, Trinidad and Tobago
	de Gourville (?) (?); Hinds (?); R. Burnett (?); C. Lewis (?)	Report	? (?)

5 December 1950 Friendly	Guadeloupe	0–1	Trinidad and Tobago	Basse-Terre, Guadeloupe
		Report	C. Lewis (?)

13 December 1951 Friendly	Guadeloupe	0–2	Trinidad and Tobago	Guadeloupe
		Report	? (?)	Attendance: 10,000

=== 1953 ===
10 August 1953 Friendly	Jamaica	3–2	Trinidad and Tobago	Kingston, Jamaica
	Alcock 28'; Williams 33'; Beek (>35)	Report	C. Lewis 52', 63'	Stadium: Sabina Park; Attendance: 3,000; Referee: Bunny Barber
Note: This match was played in 35 minute halves.

11 August 1953 Friendly	Jamaica	0–1	Trinidad and Tobago	Kingston, Jamaica
		Report	Hamel-Smith 62'	Stadium: Sabina Park; Attendance: 4,000; Referee: Bunny Barber

=== 1955 ===
December 1955 Friendly	Suriname	5–2	Trinidad and Tobago	Paramaribo, Suriname
	? (?)	Report	? (?)

December 1955 Friendly	Suriname	3–1	Trinidad and Tobago	Paramaribo, Suriname
	? (?)	Report	? (?)

December 1955 Friendly	Suriname	3–0	Trinidad and Tobago	Paramaribo, Suriname
	? (?)	Report

=== 1957 ===
21 January 1957 Friendly	Jamaica	2–0	Trinidad and Tobago	Kingston Jamaica
	Hill 14'; Alexander 45'	Report		Stadium: Sabina Park; Attendance: 6,000

26 January 1957 Friendly	Jamaica	1–0	Trinidad and Tobago	Kingston, Jamaica
	Alexander 68'	Report		Stadium: Sabina Park; Attendance: 5,000; Referee: Donovan Robinson

28 January 1957 Friendly	Jamaica	2–1	Trinidad and Tobago	Kingston, Jamaica
	Alexander 26'; McLean 38'	Report	Franco 34'	Stadium: Sabina Park; Attendance: 6,000

=== 1958 ===
4 May 1958 Friendly	Trinidad and Tobago	1–0	Jamaica	Port of Spain, Trinidad and Tobago
	Gray (?)	Report		Stadium: Queen's Park Oval; Attendance: 10,000

11 May 1958 Friendly	Trinidad and Tobago	4–0	Jamaica	Port of Spain, Trinidad and Tobago
	Baptiste 13'; Charleau 61'; Gray 63'; Franco 67'	Report		Stadium: Queen's Park Oval; Attendance: 10,000

13 May 1958 Friendly	Trinidad and Tobago	0–1	Jamaica	Port of Spain, Trinidad and Tobago
		Report	Alexander 24' (pen.)	Stadium: Queen's Park Oval

=== 1959 ===
2 March 1959 Friendly	Trinidad and Tobago	2–0	Barbados	Port of Spain, Trinidad and Tobago
	Baptiste 5'; Gray 15'	Report		Stadium: Queen's Park Oval

5 March 1959 Friendly	Trinidad and Tobago	2–1	British Guiana	San Fernando, Trinidad and Tobago
	Leggard 3'; Gray 11'	Report	Braithwaite (pen.)	Stadium: Skinner Park

10 March 1959 Friendly	Trinidad and Tobago	2–1	Jamaica	Port of Spain, Trinidad and Tobago
	Cabral 11'; Leggard 35'	Report	Parker 39'	Stadium: Queen's Park Oval; Attendance: 4,000

== Record by opponent ==
Team	Pld	W	D	L	GF	GA	GD	WPCT
British Guiana	40	23	10	7	61	25	+36	57.50
Barbados	17	10	3	4	50	19	+31	58.82
Curaçao	7	3	0	4	14	18	−4	42.86
Guadeloupe	2	2	0	0	3	0	+3	100.00
Haiti	6	3	2	1	13	9	+4	50.00
Jamaica	26	15	1	10	45	26	+19	57.69
Martinique	1	0	0	1	0	2	−2	0.00
Saint Vincent and the Grenadines	3	1	2	0	5	4	+1	33.33
Suriname	17	4	6	7	25	28	−3	23.53
Puerto Rico	2	2	0	0	15	2	+13	100.00
Total	121	63	24	34	231	133	+98	52.07

Source: Results
