= Cyril King (footballer) =

English footballer

Personal information
- Full name: Cyril William King
- Date of birth: 16 July 1915
- Place of birth: Plymouth, England
- Date of death: July qtr. 1983 (aged 68)
- Place of death: Bristol, England
- Height: 5 ft 11 in (1.80 m)
- Position: Half back

Senior career*
Years	Team	Apps	(Gls)
1933–1939	Southampton	93	(2)
1939	Darlington	0	(0)
- * Club domestic league appearances and goals

Cyril William King (16 July 1915 – 1981) was an English professional footballer who played his entire career as a half back, with Southampton in the 1930s.

== Playing career ==
Born in Plymouth he was capped for Devon schools when only fifteen years old, playing his youth football for Plymouth United. He joined Southampton as a trainee in November 1932, signing as a professional the following April. According to Holley & Chalk's "The Alphabet of the Saints" he "used his sturdy build to good effect and served the club well for five years".

His first appearance for the Division Two side was away to Newcastle United on 1 December 1934 as a replacement for Stan Woodhouse. He made a total of 13 appearances that season as The Saints narrowly avoided relegation. The following season had a similar pattern with King replacing the aging Woodhouse, making 21 appearances.

In 1936–37 he lost his place briefly to Bobby Whitelaw, who had been signed by new manager George Goss as a replacement for the now-retired Woodhouse. On regaining his place, King formed a useful partnership with fellow half-backs Bill Kennedy and Billy Kingdon, but again The Saints struggled to avoid relegation finishing 19th in the table. For the following season he again lost his place, this time to Welsh international Alf Day who had arrived on a free transfer from Millwall. Once King got back into the side in December he played in the remainder of the season's matches. He started the following season but after the match against West Bromwich Albion on 1 October 1938, he was replaced by the former Arsenal player Ray Parkin who had dropped back from his previous role as an inside forward.

Although he was retained by Southampton, he returned to Plymouth in 1939 and had started work in the Devonport dockyards before Darlington found he was available and signed him on loan in July. The outbreak of World War II prevented him making any appearances for Darlington.

== Career after football ==
During the war he joined the Royal Air Force serving in India, and the Burma Campaign as a Sergeant. After the war he returned to Hampshire and became a prison officer.
