= O'Regan =

The family name O'Regan, along with its cognates Regan, O Regan, Reagan, and O'Reagan, is an Anglicized form of the Irish surname Ó Riagáin or Ó Ríogáin, from Ua Riagáin. The meaning is likely to have originated in ancient Gaelic ri "sovereign, king" and the diminutive suffix -in; thus "the king's child" or "big king". The name was borne by two distinct families: one seated in Meath, the other in Thomond.

The O'Regans of Meath were a branch of the southern Ui Neill and one of the four Tribes of Tara. Before the Anglo-Norman invasion, they were lords of south Breagh and the north of present-day County Dublin. They took a leading part in the wars against the Danes. In the year 1029, Mathghamhain Ó Riagáin, king of Breagh, captured the son of the king of Dublin, Olaf son of Sigtrygg, releasing him only upon payment of an enormous ransom, which included the celebrated Sword of Carlus, and the son of the man who had captured him. The O'Regans were dispossessed soon after the invasion and dispersed through Ireland.

The O'Regans of Thomond are a Dalcassian family said to be descended from Riagán, son of Donncuan, brother of King Brian Boru.

== People ==
- Brian O'Regan (disambiguation), several people
- Daniel O'Regan, New Zealand rugby league player
- Danny O'Regan, American ice hockey player
- Denis O'Regan, photographer
- Hana O'Regan, New Zealand Maori activist
- J. Kevin O'Regan, psychologist interested in phenomenal consciousness
- Kate O'Regan, South African lawyer and judge
- Katherine O'Regan, New Zealand politician
- Mark O'Regan, New Zealand judge
- Michael O'Regan (disambiguation), several people
- Patrick O'Regan, New Zealand politician and jurist
- Rolland O'Regan, New Zealand politician and surgeon
- Ron O'Regan, New Zealand rugby player
- Seamus O'Regan, Canadian politician and former broadcast journalist
- Susan O'Regan, New Zealand politician
- Tarik O'Regan, British composer
- Tipene O'Regan, New Zealand politician and educator
- Thomas O'Regan, Australian academic

=== Figures in the Catholic Church ===
- Anthony O'Regan, Catholic bishop
- Cyril O'Regan

== Places ==
- O'Regan's, Newfoundland and Labrador, a village in Newfoundland, Canada

== See also ==
- Regan, surname
- Jack Reagan
