= Norman Catlin =

English footballer

Personal information
- Full name: Norman John Catlin
- Date of birth: 8 January 1918
- Place of birth: Liverpool, England
- Date of death: 22 May 1941 (aged 23)
- Place of death: HMS Gloucester, Kythira Strait, off Crete
- Height: 5 ft 8 in (1.73 m)
- Position: Outside right

Youth career
- Bitterne Boys Club
- 1932–1933: Arsenal
- 1933–1935: Southampton

Senior career*
Years	Team	Apps	(Gls)
1935–1937	Southampton	6	(0)
1937–1938	Ryde Sports		
1938–1939	Southampton	0	(0)

International career
	England Schoolboys		(0)
- * Club domestic league appearances and goals

Norman John Catlin (8 January 1918 – 22 May 1941) was an English footballer, who showed considerable promise as a schoolboy which was not fulfilled as a professional with Southampton Football Club. He died in the controversial sinking of HMS Gloucester off the coast of Crete in May 1941.

== Football career ==
Catlin was born in Liverpool but moved as a child to the Bitterne area of Southampton. When he scored 17 goals in an English Schools Shield match in 1932, he made the national sporting headlines. In all he scored 62 goals in 13 matches as Southampton schoolboys reached the final. This prolific goalscoring form attracted the attention of Arsenal who signed him on amateur terms; he was shortly afterwards capped for the England Schoolboys.

He subsequently returned to Southampton, joining the "Saints" as an amateur in June 1933, before signing a professional contract on his 17th birthday in January 1935. After playing in the reserves, he made his first-team debut away to Swansea Town on 28 December 1935, when he played at outside-right as replacement for Arthur Holt.

He appeared to find his slight build a disadvantage and failed to develop into the player that everyone had expected. After only six first-team appearances, his League career ended in March 1937, when aged only 19. He then played for Ryde Sports on the Isle of Wight, although he was re-signed by Southampton in 1938 on a part-time basis, without getting back into the first team.

== Naval career and death ==
After ending his full-time football career in 1937, Catlin joined the Cunard-White Star Company as a clerk.

On the outbreak of World War II, Catlin enlisted in the Royal Navy. He was a member of the crew of HMS Gloucester when she was attacked by German Stuka dive bombers off the northern coast of Crete and sank on 22 May 1941. Catlin was posted missing on 29 May, but is now confirmed to have died during the sinking. Of the 807 men aboard at the time of her sinking, only 85 survived.

== See also ==
- List of footballers killed during World War II
