= HMS Gloucester (62) =

Gloucester-class cruiser

Coordinates: 35°50′N 23°0′E

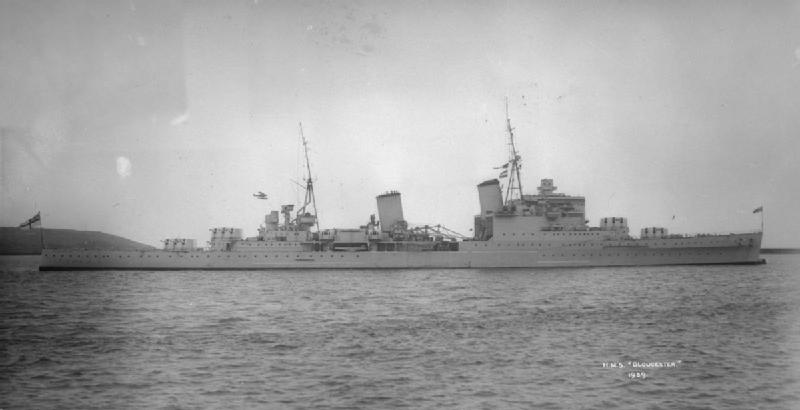
- Gloucester at anchor, 1939

History

United Kingdom
- Name: Gloucester
- Namesake: Gloucester
- Builder: Devonport Dockyard
- Laid down: 22 September 1936
- Launched: 19 October 1937
- Sponsored by: Princess Alice, Duchess of Gloucester
- Completed: 31 January 1939
- Identification: Pennant number: 62
- Nickname(s): "The Fighting G"
- Fate: Sunk by German aircraft, 22 May 1941

General characteristics (as built)
- Class & type: Town-class light cruiser
- Displacement: 9,400 long tons (9,551 t) (standard); 11,650 long tons (11,837 t) (full load)
- Length: 588 ft (179.2 m)
- Beam: 62 ft 4 in (19.0 m)
- Draught: 20 ft 7 in (6.3 m)
- Installed power: 4 × Admiralty 3-drum boilers; 82,500 shp (61,500 kW)
- Propulsion: 4 × shafts; 4 × geared steam turbines
- Speed: 32 knots (59.3 km/h; 36.8 mph)
- Range: 6,000 nmi (11,000 km; 6,900 mi) at 14 knots (26 km/h; 16 mph)
- Complement: 800–815
- Armament: 4 × triple 6-inch (152 mm) guns; 4 × twin 4-inch (102 mm) DP guns; 2 × quadruple 2-pdr (40 mm (1.6 in)) AA guns; 2 × quadruple 0.5 in (12.7 mm) AA machine guns; 2 × triple 21 in (533 mm) torpedo tubes
- Armour: Waterline belt: 4.5 in (114 mm); Deck: 2 in (51 mm); Gun turrets: 1–2 in (25–51 mm)
- Aircraft carried: 2 × Supermarine Walrus flying boats
- Aviation facilities: 1 × catapult

HMS Gloucester was one of the second batch of three Town-class light cruisers built for the Royal Navy during the late 1930s. Commissioned shortly before the start of World War II in August 1939, the ship was initially assigned to the China Station and was transferred to the Indian Ocean and later to South Africa to search for German commerce raiders. She was transferred to the Mediterranean Fleet in mid-1940 and spent much of her time escorting Malta Convoys. Gloucester played minor roles in the Battle of Calabria in 1940 and the Battle of Cape Matapan in 1941. She was sunk by German dive bombers on 22 May 1941 during the Battle of Crete with the loss of 722 men out of a crew of 807. Gloucester acquired the nickname "The Fighting G" after earning five battle honours in less than a year.

== Design and description ==
The Town-class light cruisers were designed as counters to the Japanese Mogami-class cruisers built during the early 1930s and the last batch of three ships was enlarged to accommodate more fire-control equipment and thicker armour. Gloucester displaced 9,400 long tons (9,551 t) at standard load and 11,650 long tons (11,837 t) at deep load. The ship had an overall length of 591 feet 6 inches (180.3 m), a beam of 62 feet 4 inches (19.0 m) and a draught of 20 feet 7 inches (6.3 m). She was powered by four Parsons geared steam turbine sets, each driving one shaft, using steam provided by four Admiralty 3-drum boilers. The turbines developed a total of 82,500 shaft horsepower (61,500 kW) and gave a maximum speed of 32 knots (59 km/h; 37 mph). The ship carried enough fuel oil to give her a range of 6,000 nautical miles (11,000 km; 6,900 mi) at 14 knots (26 km/h; 16 mph). The ship's complement was 800–815 officers and ratings.

The Town-class ships mounted twelve BL six-inch (152 mm) Mk XXIII guns in four triple-gun turrets. The turrets were designated 'A', 'B', 'X' and 'Y' from front to rear. Their secondary armament consisted of eight QF four-inch (102 mm) Mk XVI dual-purpose guns in twin mounts. Their light anti-aircraft armament consisted of a pair of quadruple mounts for the two-pounder (40 mm (1.6 in)) AA gun ("pom-pom") and two quadruple mounts for 0.5-inch (12.7 mm) Vickers AA machine guns. The ships carried two above-water, triple mounts for 21-inch (533 mm) torpedoes.

The Towns lacked a full-length waterline armour belt. The sides of Gloucester's boiler and engine rooms and the sides of the magazines were protected by 4.5 inches (114 mm) of armour. The top of the magazines and the machinery spaces were protected by 2 inches (51 mm) of armour. The armour protecting the main gun turrets had a thickness of 1–2 inches (25–51 mm).

== Construction and career ==
Gloucester, the ninth ship of her name to serve in the Royal Navy, was laid down on 22 September 1936. She was launched on 19 October 1937 by Princess Alice, Duchess of Gloucester. During sea trials off the coast of Talland, Cornwall, in November 1938, the cruiser recorded an average speed at a standard displacement of 31.92 knots (59.12 km/h; 36.73 mph) against the measured mile. This was the slowest trial speed recorded out of nine ships from the class, (Note: Only nine of the ten ships can be compared as a portion of the trial data for Birmingham has been lost. Birmingham had been the only other ship of the class to undergo trials at Talland.) with Liverpool achieving the highest average speed at 33.05 knots (61.21 km/h; 38.03 mph) off the Isle of Arran. However, trials at Talland generally resulted in lower speeds than at other locations due to its shallow depth affecting propulsion efficiency.

Following completion on 31 January 1939, the ship was assigned as the flagship of the 4th Cruiser Squadron (CS) on the China Station, where she served until the beginning of World War II in September. In mid-November, Gloucester and the French aviso Rigault de Genouilly were assigned to patrol the Indian Ocean between Madagascar and Seychelles in an unsuccessful search for the German commerce raider Admiral Graf Spee. In December, she was transferred to Force I at Simonstown, South Africa, where she fruitlessly patrolled the South Atlantic against other commerce raiders. The ship carried a large contingent of seconded South African personnel.

=== In the Mediterranean ===
The ship was transferred to the 7th Cruiser Squadron of the Mediterranean Fleet at Alexandria, Egypt, in May 1940. A few days after Italy joined the war on 10 June, Gloucester and her sister ship, Liverpool, bombarded Tobruk, Libya, sinking a small auxiliary minesweeper on the 12th. Several weeks later, the 7th CS was covering several convoys to and from Malta when British Short Sunderland flying boats spotted an Italian convoy on the 28th. The squadron was ordered to intercept and sank the destroyer Espero with a prodigious expenditure of ammunition.

On 7 July, the Mediterranean Fleet sortied to cover more Malta convoys, but they were spotted by the Italians that evening. The next day, a bomb dropped by Savoia-Marchetti SM.79 bombers struck the ship's bridge, killing 18 crew members instantly, including the captain. As a result of the attack, the ship could not be steered from the bridge and was uncontrolled for a time before the aft steering position could take over. Despite an inoperable bridge, the ship remained with the fleet and participated in the Battle of Calabria on the 9th, although she was ordered away from the battleline to escort the aircraft carrier Eagle. Repairs were completed by the end of August when Gloucester, now assigned to the 3rd Cruiser Squadron, participated in Operation Hats. At the end of September, the ship ferried 1,200 troops to Malta, together with Liverpool. Gloucester spent most of the rest of the year escorting convoys to and from Greece and Malta, although she escorted the aircraft carrier Illustrious during the Battle of Taranto on 11 November and ferried troops to Piraeus, Greece, on the 17th.

On 11 January 1941, while supporting Operation Excess (several coordinated convoys), Gloucester and sister ship Southampton came under attack from Junkers Ju 87 "Stuka" dive bombers from StG 2 while leaving Malta. Gloucester was hit by a 250-kilogram (550 lb) bomb which failed to explode after penetrating through five decks. Southampton was hit by at least two bombs and caught fire; heavily damaged and without power, the ship was scuttled by torpedoes from the light cruiser Orion.

==== Battle of Cape Matapan ====
On 27 March, Gloucester, now reassigned to the 7th CS, departed Piraeus bound for Souda Bay, Crete as part of Vice-Admiral Andrew Cunningham's plan to trap and destroy a large portion of the Italian Fleet which was at sea in an attempt to intercept British convoys operating between Greece and Egypt. British signals intelligence had revealed the Italian plan and Cunningham attempted to consolidate his ships, but was delayed and missed his rendezvous with the 7th CS scheduled for the following morning. The Italians located the squadron first and the 3rd Cruiser Division with three heavy cruisers, escorted by three destroyers, opened fire at 08:12 at very long range. Only Gloucester returned fire as the British attempted to disengage, but the Italians followed, against orders, when Admiral Angelo Iachino recalled them at 08:55. The 7th CS turned around to observe the Italian manoeuvre and Iachino attempted to pincer the British cruisers between his 3rd Cruiser Division and his flagship, the battleship Vittorio Veneto. Although Vice-Admiral Henry Pridham-Wippell knew that the Italians had a battleship at sea, he was still caught by surprise when Vittorio Veneto opened fire at 10:55 at Orion. The 3rd Cruiser Division joined in shortly afterwards, but gunnery problems plagued the Italians and they scored no hits against their primary targets, Gloucester and Orion. The British ships laid smoke screens and turned south towards the main body of the Mediterranean Fleet. An unsuccessful attack by torpedo bombers from the aircraft carrier Formidable persuaded Iachino to turn back at 11:40. The 7th CS was able to keep up the pursuit that afternoon after another torpedo bomber attack damaged the Vittorio Veneto at 15:20 and reduced her speed. A subsequent attack crippled the heavy cruiser Pola and Orion's radar picked up Pola, and the two other heavy cruisers that had been sent to her assistance, at 20:15. Cunningham's three battleships quickly sank all three heavy cruisers at point-blank range later that night.

=== Sinking ===
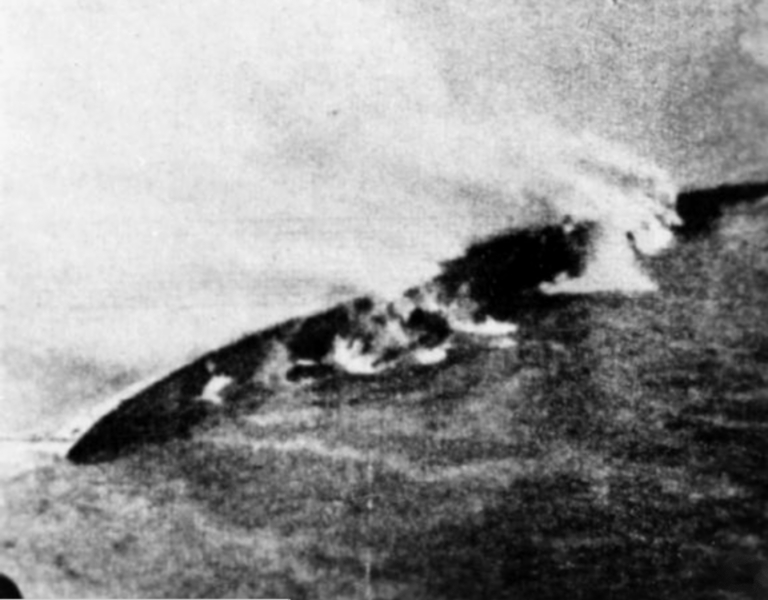
Photograph taken by a German airman recording the sinking of Gloucester off the coast of Crete, 22 May 1941

Gloucester repeatedly bombarded targets in Libya during April. After covering another convoy to Malta, the ship, together with the battleships Warspite, Valiant, and Barham, and various destroyers, attacked Tripoli harbour on the night of 20/21 April with some success. At the end of the month, the ship was briefly transferred to Force H at Gibraltar before escorting a convoy eastward to Malta and rejoining the Mediterranean Fleet in Operation Tiger in early May.

To counter the German invasion of Crete, Cunningham split his fleet into several forces, which would act independently to intercept German sea transports. After German paratroopers landed on Crete on 20 May, Gloucester was assigned as the command ship of Force B and tasked with interdicting any efforts to reinforce the German forces on the island. Force B was ordered on a night patrol between Cape Elephonsi and Cape Matapan but encountered no enemies and joined up with Rear Admiral Rawlings' Force A1 on the morning of 21 May. A German and Italian convoy was sighted by allied reconnaissance later that day and Forces B, C and D were ordered to intercept and engage, with Force D making contact at 23:30.

Force B again encountered no enemy naval vessels but came under attack from fifty "Stuka"s of VIII. Fliegerkorps at 06:30 on 22 May, as they returned westwards to rejoin Rawlings and Force A1. Gloucester and the light cruiser Fiji took damage from near misses. Force B made the rendezvous with Force A1 and Force D (Rear Admiral Irvine Glennie) at about 08:30 and the combined force was ordered to report on their levels of high-angle anti-aircraft ammunition at 09:30. Of the cruisers, Ajax had 40%, Orion 38%, Fiji 30%, Dido 25% and Gloucester only 18%. Ajax, Orion and Dido were ordered to return to Alexandria with Glennie's Force D to rearm but Gloucester and Fiji remained with Rawlings' Force A1.

At 12:25 Force A1, stationed 20 to 30 miles west of Antikythera, received a request from Rear Admiral Edward Leigh Stuart King to support the damaged Naiad and the rest of his Force C. Force A1 headed east into the Kythira Strait, rendezvousing with Force C between 13:30 and 14:00. As the more senior admiral, King took command, with air attacks now inflicting damage on both forces. At 14:02 and 14:07 respectively, Fiji and Gloucester were detached to provide anti-aircraft support for the destroyers Kandahar and Kingston. The two destroyers having already been ordered to rescue the survivors of the destroyer Greyhound, which had been sunk at 13:50. Writing in despatches after the battle, Cunningham stated that King was unaware of the shortage of anti-aircraft ammunition in Fiji and Gloucester. At 14:13 King and Rawlings exchanged messages about the shortage of ammunition within both Force C and Force A1, with Rawlings expressing concern about the orders given to Gloucester and Fiji. Following this communication, King issued an order to recall both Gloucester and Fiji at 14:57.

While in the Kythira Strait, about 14 miles (12 nmi; 23 km) north of Crete, Gloucester and Fiji were attacked by "Stuka"s of StG 2. Between 15:30 and 15:50, while attempting to rejoin Force A1, Gloucester was hit by several bombs and the decision was taken to leave her behind due to the air attacks. Fiji, under heavy fire, dropped rafts as she passed Gloucester but was unable to stop and was herself sunk within a few hours.

The 5th Destroyer Flotilla, led by Kelly, was dispatched to search for survivors of both the Gloucester and the Fiji in the evening but was diverted to bombard the Germans at Maleme airfield before reaching the search area. Eventually the Germans picked up the survivors and brought them to Kythira. Of the 807 men aboard at the time of her sinking, only 85 survived to reach shore; two more subsequently died after being taken into captivity, one in 1941 and another in 1945. (Note: There is some disagreement between sources on the number of survivors. Otter (1999), Boggan (2001) and Waters (2019) all agree that 85 men survived to be taken into captivity in 1941 but only 83 survived to return home in 1945. The BBC (1999) states that 84 survived to be taken into captivity in 1941 but does not comment on numbers that returned home after the war. Earlier sources, such as Thomas (1972) and Shores (1987a) reported 500 survivors, but Otter suggests this may have been a result of taking speculation by contemporary sources as fact.)

The circumstances of the sinking were featured by a BBC programme. According to this, the despatch of Gloucester, alone and low on fuel and anti-aircraft ammunition (less than 20% remaining), into danger was a "grievous error". Furthermore, the failure to attempt to rescue survivors after dark was "contrary to usual Navy practice". A survivor commented "The tradition in the Navy is that when a ship has sunk, a vessel is sent back to pick up survivors under cover of darkness. That did not happen and we do not know why. We were picked up by Germans." On 30 May 1941, in a letter to the First Sea Lord, Sir Dudley Pound, Cunningham wrote, "The sending back of Gloucester and Fiji to the Greyhound was another grave error and cost us those two ships. They were practically out of ammunition but even had they been full up I think they would have gone. The Commanding Officer of Fiji told me that the air over Gloucester was black with planes."

Following the loss of both Gloucester and Fiji to air attacks after their anti-aircraft ammunition was exhausted, all British cruisers were instructed not to allow their anti-aircraft ammunition reserves to fall below 40%.

The ship's wreck is a controlled site under the Protection of Military Remains Act 1986. Amongst the crewmen lost was the former Southampton footballer Norman Catlin.

== Bibliography ==
- Colledge, J. J.; Warlow, Ben (2006) [1969]. Ships of the Royal Navy: The Complete Record of All Fighting Ships of the Royal Navy from the 15th Century to the Present (3rd Rev ed.). London: Chatham Publishing. ISBN 978-1-86176-281-8. OCLC 67375475.
- "Cunningham, A. B., The Battle of Crete, Despatch to the Lord Commissioners of the Admiralty, 4 August 1941". The London Gazette (Supplement). No. 38296. 21 May 1948. pp. 3103–3119.
- Greene, Jack & Massignani, Alessandro (2011). The Naval War in the Mediterranean 1940–1943. Annapolis, Maryland: Naval Institute Press. ISBN 978-1-59114-561-5.
- Holley, Duncan & Chalk, Gary (1992). The Alphabet of the Saints. ACL & Polar Publishing. ISBN 0-9514862-3-3.
- Lenton, H. T. (1998). British & Empire Warships of the Second World War. Annapolis, Maryland: Naval Institute Press. ISBN 1-55750-048-7.
- McCart, Neil (2012). Town Class Cruisers. Liskeard, UK: Maritime Books. ISBN 978-1-904-45952-1.
- O'Hara, Vincent P. (2008). "The Action off Calabria and the Myth of Moral Ascendancy". In Jordan, John (ed.). Warship 2008. London: Conway. pp. 26–39. ISBN 978-1-84486-062-3.
- Otter, Ken (2001) [First published 1999]. HMS Gloucester: The Untold Story (2nd ed.). Durham, UK: G.A.M. Books. ISBN 0-9522194-2-5. OCLC 59524624.
- Preston, Antony (1982). Cruisers. Greenwich, Connecticut: Bison Books. ISBN 0-86124-064-2.
- Raven, Alan & Roberts, John (1980). British Cruisers of World War Two. Annapolis, Maryland: Naval Institute Press. ISBN 0-87021-922-7.
- Rohwer, Jürgen (2005). Chronology of the War at Sea 1939–1945: The Naval History of World War Two (Third Revised ed.). Annapolis, Maryland: Naval Institute Press. ISBN 1-59114-119-2.
- Shores, Christopher; Cull, Brian & Malizia, Nicola (1987a). Air War for Yugoslavia, Greece, and Crete. London: Grub Street. ISBN 0-948817-07-0.
- Shores, Christopher; Cull, Brian & Malizia, Nicola (1987b). Malta: The Hurricane Years 1940–41. London: Grub Street. ISBN 0-948817-06-2.
- Thomas, David Arthur (1980) [First published 1972]. Crete 1941: The Battle at Sea. Athens: Efstathiadis Group. ISBN 9780233962726. OCLC 11023583.
- Waters, Conrad (2019). British Town Class Cruisers: Design, Development & Performance; Southampton & Belfast Classes. Barnsley, UK: Seaforth Publishing. ISBN 978-1-5267-1885-3.
- Whitley, M. J. (1995). Cruisers of World War Two: An International Encyclopedia. London: Cassell. ISBN 1-86019-874-0.
