= Fred Smallwood =

Welsh footballer

Personal information
- Date of birth: 16 September 1910
- Place of birth: Brynteg, Wales
- Date of death: 1 December 1965 (aged 55)
- Place of death: Durham, England
- Height: 5 ft 5 in (1.65 m)
- Position: Outside forward

Youth career
- Llanerch Celts

Senior career*
Years	Team	Apps	(Gls)
1933–1934	Wrexham	1	(1)
1934–1935	Chester	1	(0)
1935–1936	Macclesfield Town	42	(26)
1936–1938	Southampton	48	(10)
1938–1940	Reading	43	(12)
- Wrexham (wartime guest)
- Newcastle United (wartime guest)
- Sunderland (wartime guest)
- Hartlepool United (wartime guest)

International career
- Wales amateur
- * Club domestic league appearances and goals

Frederick Smallwood (16 September 1910 – 1 December 1965) was a Welsh professional footballer who played as an outside forward for Southampton and Reading in the 1930s.

== Football career ==
Smallwood was born in Brynteg, near Wrexham in North Wales and worked as a coal-miner in the nearby Gresford Colliery. He played for Llanerch Celts before joining Wrexham as an amateur in September 1933. During his time at Wrexham, he gained caps as an amateur for Wales.

In September 1934, he moved to Chester, signing as a professional in October. After a year with Chester, in which he made one appearance in the Football League Third Division North, he dropped down to non-league football with Macclesfield Town.

In June 1936, he was recruited by Southampton of the Football League Second Division. He was one of several players recruited by new manager George Goss and replaced Laurie Fishlock, who was unavailable as he was on a tour of Australia with the England cricket team. Smallwood made his debut for the Saints in the opening match of the 1936–37 season, scoring in a 3–2 victory over Chesterfield. Described as "a small but nippy left-winger", Smallwood only missed one match in his first season at The Dell and scored ten goals.

Smallwood was a superstitious player, who would always carry a lucky rabbit's foot in the pocket of his shorts on match days.

In the summer of 1937, he was injured in a pre-season warm-up match and lost his place to Harry Osman. In the 1937–38 season, Smallwood managed only eight appearances, usually playing at outside left. At the end of the season, he refused a new contract and moved to Reading of the Football League Third Division South.

He remained with Reading until the start of the Second World War, making 43 league appearances, scoring 12 goals.

== Later career ==
Smallwood retired from professional football during the war, but made guest appearances for Wrexham, Newcastle United, Sunderland and Hartlepool United.

He settled in the Sunderland area after the war where he played in a small dance band.
