= Thomas Dunn =

Thomas or Tom Dunn may refer to:

- Thomas Dunn (bishop) (1870–1931), Roman Catholic bishop of Nottingham
- Thomas Dunn (lieutenant-governor) (1729–1818), lieutenant governor of Canada
- Thomas Dunn (mayor) (1801–1871), English mayor of Sheffield
- Thomas Dunn (musician) (1925–2008), American musician and conductor
- Thomas A. Dunn (born 1942), politician and judge in Illinois
- Thomas B. Dunn (1853–1924), U.S. congressman from New York
- Thomas G. Dunn (1921–1998), American Democratic Party politician and mayor of Elizabeth, New Jersey
- Thomas W. Dunn (1908–1983), U.S. Army general
- Thomas M. Dunn (1836–1916), American physician and politician in Virginia
- Tom Dunn (golf course architect) (1849–1902), Scottish golfer, golf club maker and golf course architect
- Tom Dunn (journalist) (1929–2006), New York reporter
- Tom Newton Dunn (born 1973), English journalist
- Tom Dunn (rugby union) (born 1992), English rugby player
- Thomas Dunn (rugby union) (1913–1975), Irish international rugby union player
- Tom Dunn (umpire) (1900–1976), American baseball umpire
- Tommy Dunn (1873–1938), Scottish footballer
- Tommy Dunn (boxer) (born 1954), English boxer
- Thomas Dunn (footballer, born 2003), Fijian footballer

== See also ==
- Thomas Dunne (disambiguation)
