= Sid Gueran =

English footballer (1916–1944)

Personal information
- Full name: Sidney Frederick Gueran
- Date of birth: 2 October 1916
- Place of birth: Grays, Essex, England
- Date of death: 18 September 1944 (aged 27)
- Place of death: Arnhem, German-occupied Netherlands
- Height: 5 ft 9 in (1.75 m)
- Position: Inside right

Senior career*
Years	Team	Apps	(Gls)
1935–1938	Arsenal	0	(0)
1935–1938	Margate		
1936–1938	→Southampton (loan)	3	(0)
1938	Exeter City	0	(0)
- * Club domestic league appearances and goals

Sidney Frederick Gueran (2 October 1916 – 18 September 1944) was an English footballer who made three first-team appearances for Southampton in 1937. His career was cut short when he was killed while serving with the British Army at the Battle of Arnhem, part of Operation Market Garden, in September 1944.

== Football career ==
Gueran was born in Grays, Essex, before moving to Ramsgate as a child where he represented Ramsgate Schools. He joined Arsenal as an 18-year-old in May 1935 and was "farmed out" to play for Margate, Arsenal's nursery side.

Southampton's manager, Tom Parker (formerly an Arsenal player), used his connections to sign Gueran on loan in March 1936. Described as "a thoughtful and constructive inside-forward", Gueran spent most of his "Saints" career in the reserves, but was given a run-out in the first team in the last match of the 1936–37 season, when he replaced Wilf Mayer in a 3–0 defeat at home to Nottingham Forest.

Gueran made two further appearances in the opening matches of the next season, both defeats, before Arthur Holt took over at inside-right. Gueran then returned to reserve-team football, before being recalled by Arsenal in May 1938. A few weeks later, he was transferred permanently to Exeter City of the Third Division South, but failed to break into the first-team and "retired" from professional football later that year.

== Later career and death ==
On the outbreak of World War II, Gueran enlisted in the Royal Engineers as a sapper attached to the 1st Parachute Squadron. He took part in the North African Campaign and the Italian campaign, and was killed on the second day of the Battle of Arnhem near the Arnhem road bridge while inside the Van Limburg Stirum School. An account of his death was presented in the book Arnhem 1944: The Human Tragedy of the Bridge Too Far, told by Gueran's platoon leader, Lance-Sergeant Harold Padfield.

I went to Sapper Sid Gueran and set him up on a desk, so he could comfortably sit and cover a vital area to the west, through a porthole window. I was telling him the area I wanted him to cover but couldn't understand why I wasn't getting a response. When I turned towards him, he was sat upright – shot through the mouth. It must have been a stray bullet because I certainly didn't hear anything. I got hold of Joe Malley, who I had put in charge of this particular area, and we laid Sid on the floor, making sure his dog tags were around his neck. So this was the end of Sid, and by 0900 hrs [sic] on the Monday morning, I'd had my first casualty. It was upsetting, to lose someone so early on, because you weren't trained to lose people or deal with it when you did. But, you just have to get on with it.

He is commemorated on the Groesbeek Memorial in the Groesbeek Canadian War Cemetery.

== Note ==
In all three of his first-team appearances for Southampton, Gueran played in front of defender Charlie Sillett, who was also killed on active service, in a U-boat attack on an allied convoy while serving with the Royal Navy in 1945.

== See also ==
- List of footballers killed during World War II
