= Jimmy Dunne (footballer, born 1935) =

Irish footballer

Personal information
- Full name: James Patrick Dunne
- Date of birth: 16 March 1935
- Place of birth: London England
- Date of death: 1983 or 1984
- Place of death: Dunstable, England
- Position: Inside forward

Senior career*
Years	Team	Apps	(Gls)
1953–1956	Leicester City	4	(0)
1956–1960	St Patrick's Athletic	?	(21)
1957–1958	Tunbridge Wells United	?	(?)
1960–1962	Peterborough United	17	(3)
1962–1963	Bedford Town	18	(2)
1963–?	Cambridge United		
- Dunstable Town
?–1970	Rushden Town		
- * Club domestic league appearances and goals

James Patrick Dunne (16 March 1935 – 1983 or 1984) was an Irish footballer.

The son of Irish international Jimmy Dunne, Jimmy Dunne the younger played for St Patrick's Athletic with his brother Tommy, winning the 1959 FAI Cup. He also had brief stints in England, with Leicester City and Peterborough United. After leaving Leicester City he had a short spell with Tunbridge Wells United and on leaving Peterborough United he moved to Bedford Town and then Cambridge United

A former schoolboy international he made a scoring League of Ireland debut on 22 April 1956 against Shamrock Rovers in a Top Four Cup semi final tie.
