= Alf Charles =

Trinidadian footballer

Personal information
- Full name: Alfred Pious Charles
- Date of birth: 11 July 1909
- Place of birth: Trinidad and Tobago
- Date of death: 1977
- Height: 5 ft 9 in (1.75 m)
- Position: Inside forward

Senior career*
Years	Team	Apps	(Gls)
19??–1933	Everton (Port of Spain)		
1933–1934	Burnley	0	(0)
1934–1935	Nelson		
1935	Darwen		
1935–1936	Stalybridge Celtic		
1937	Southampton	1	(0)
1938–19??	Stalybridge Celtic		
- * Club domestic league appearances and goals

Alfred Pious Charles (11 July 1909 – 1977) was a Trinidadian footballer who made one appearance (as an inside forward) in the Football League Second Division with Southampton in 1937. He was one of the earliest black players in English professional football and the first black player to sign for Southampton.

== Cricket career ==
He was born in Trinidad and first came to England with the 1933 West Indies cricket team as valet to the star player Learie Constantine. Although he never played on the tour, he subsequently turned out for Nelson in the Lancashire League in 1935 and 1936. He made one appearance for a West Indies XI against an England XI in June 1944 and after the war he played for Lowerhouse in the Lancashire League.

== Football career ==
He stayed on in England after the 1933 cricket tour was over and secured a contract with Burnley, but failed to break through into their first team. He then dropped out of the Football League, joining first Nelson in 1934 and then Darwen the following year before settling at Stalybridge Celtic where he established an impressive goal scoring record. This soon attracted him to a number of Football League clubs but manager George Goss persuaded him to move to the south coast to join Southampton.

He arrived at The Dell in January 1937 with a reputation as a "clever inside forward either on the left or right." He made his solitary appearance in the Football League in a 2–2 draw at Bradford City on 9 January 1937 replacing Billy Boyd. He also played in five reserve games, in which he scored two goals. He returned to Stalybridge in January 1938 for a fee of £350.
