= Denis O'Regan =

British photographer

Denis O'Regan is an English photographer. His imagery is particularly associated with the punk movement, Queen, David Bowie, and Duran Duran, and O'Regan has photographed everyone from AC/DC to ZZ Top, documenting Punk, New Romanticism, Grunge, and Heavy Metal along the way. O'Regan has undertaken many European, US, and World tours, worked as official photographer at Live Aid and the Concert For Diana, and travelled as official photographer to David Bowie, Duran Duran, The Rolling Stones, The Who, Queen, Kiss, Europe, Neil Diamond, Bee Gees, Pink Floyd and Thin Lizzy. His work has been widely published and exhibited. He has photographed David Bowie and Duran Duran more than any other photographer, covering over 200 concerts around the world by the former. In 2021, O'Regan was appointed as the first ever Artist In Residence at London's Royal Albert Hall.

== Early years ==
Born in London in November 1953 to Irish parents who had eloped from County Cork, O'Regan grew up in Barnes, West London and attended St Benedict's School, following which he was offered a place at nearby Ealing Art College, famously attended a generation before by rock elite Freddie Mercury, Keith Richards, Ronnie Wood, Ray Davies and Pete Townshend. However, parental influence prevailed and he was temporarily diverted towards a position in the City of London as a trainee broker at Willis Faber & Dumas, then as a trainee underwriter at the world centre of insurance, Lloyd's of London.

Prior to this orthodox career move, O'Regan had seen The Beatles at the Hammersmith Odeon in 1964 with his mother, Marie. In the early 1970s, he smuggled a camera into the same venue to photograph Paul McCartney and Queen. Inspired by seeing Led Zeppelin's Jimmy Page perform at Alexandra Palace, and David Bowie's Ziggy Stardust at Hammersmith, O'Regan taught himself photography. He resigned his day job, toured Europe on a student rail pass, and returned to comprehensively document the readily-accessible Punk explosion in London. A major contributor to NME in the late Seventies, O'Regan combined his love of photography and travel when in the Eighties he toured with some of the world's top rock bands, including those he had grown up with as a fan.

== World tours ==
As official photographer O’Regan undertook European and World tours with many artists, including Thin Lizzy in 1980, 1981, and 1982; David Bowie in 1983, 1987, and 1990; The Rolling Stones in 1982 (their only European tour of the decade); Duran Duran over many years including their most successful tour in 1984; Spandau Ballet and Neil Diamond in 1985; Queen in 1986 (their last tour with Freddie Mercury); Pink Floyd in 1994; KISS in 2008. During this period he was commissioned to shoot shows that set attendance records for the UK, Southern Hemisphere, and Eastern Bloc.

O’Regan was appointed official photographer for Live Aid at Wembley Stadium in 1985, and in co-operation with Bob Geldof produced the record-selling commemorative book. He also shot Live 8 in Hyde Park as an official photographer in 2005. Record album covers featuring his live work include Queen's Live Magic, Live at Wembley '86, Queen on Fire - Live at the Bowl, Knebworth '90, Thin Lizzy's 'Wild One: the Very Best of Thin Lizzy' & 'Still Dangerous: Live at the Tower Theatre Philadelphia', Pink Floyd's P*U*L*S*E, Sting's 'Bring on the Night', The Cure's 'Seventeen Seconds', Duran Duran's Decade: Greatest Hits, and the Rolling Stones' Forty Licks.

== Published work ==
Denis O’Regan has produced numerous books, including Images of Punk, Queen's A Magic Tour and Queen – The Full Picture, David Bowie's Serious Moonlight world tour, Duran Duran's Sing Blue Silver, and his work has featured in publications such as Time, Life, Newsweek, "Rolling Stone", "GQ" and Photo as well as every UK national newspaper, and pop and rock magazines across the world. Other past clients include Pepsi, HBO, MTV, VH1, and Aston Martin.

The 2018 O’Regan's 'Ricochet : David Bowie 1983' boxed set was a huge success both in hardback published by Penguin Random House; and as a limited edition boxed set containing five books, limited edition vinyl and fine art prints, published by Moonlight Books. The books comprehensively and intimately document David Bowie's most successful year following the release of his 'Let's Dance' album. The Ricochet boxed set was the first product to feature the David Bowie estate stamp, and is on display in the Victoria & Albert Museum’s permanent collection in London.

In 1999 Peter Blake (artist) (designer of the Beatles' Sergeant Pepper album cover) used a Denis O'Regan picture of Freddie Mercury in his design for the Royal Mail's Millennium first class postage stamp. His photographs of Queen band members Freddie Mercury and Brian May also graced Royal Mail stamps released in 2020. O'Regan received a dedication from UK 'lad lit' writer Tony Parsons in his Punk eulogy 'The Boy Looked at Johnny', and features in diverse biographies and autobiographies including The Fun Starts Here by 'Mrs Geldof' Paula Yates. One of Keith Richards' favourite O'Regan photographs - a live shot with Charlie Watts - is featured in Richards' 2010 autobiography Life.

== Digital age ==
It is widely accepted that O’Regan pioneered the use of autofocus cameras (in 1987) and digital cameras in the late 1990s. He digitally shot and uploaded photos to national press from the backstage area of the MTV 1998 European Music Awards, and Paul McCartney's return to The Cavern in 1999. His pictures of the latter made the front pages of every UK national newspaper the following morning, including The Daily Telegraph, The Times and the Daily Mail. In the same year O’Regan founded one of the UK's first legal music download sites, which sold a milestone 25,000 tracks in the months prior to the Millennium (four years before the launch of Apple's iTunes store). He grew up in Barnes, West London, at the same time as Tim Berners-Lee, inventor of the World Wide Web. In 2021 O’Regan entered the nascent NFT market, successfully selling out a number of David Bowie image drops.

== Recent updates ==
O'Regan worked closely with Duran Duran during the 1980s and 1990s and reunited with the reformed band for rehearsals in 2003 and European tours in 2004/2005. Having covered Pink Floyd's final tour - The Division Bell in 1994, he also shot their final ever performance at Live 8 in London's Hyde Park in 2005. His work has been exhibited at various venues including Proud Galleries, the Air Gallery, backstage at MTV's European Music Awards (London & Rome), backstage at Wembley Arena, and at Apple's flagship London Store on Regent Street. In 2016 he was the only non-US photographer featured in the Coachella 'Desert Trip' exhibition, which was attended by 100,000 visitors.

Denis was appointed official photographer for the 1996-1999 MTV European Music Awards; 2006-2009 Download festivals; Kylie Minogue's 2006/2007 UK Showgirl tour; Prince William and Prince Harry's 2007 Concert For Diana at Wembley Stadium, where he took all the official backstage portraits; Glastonbury 2011; and Coachella Festival, which he has regularly covered for the organisers. Following the 2016 'Fame Fashion Photography' David Bowie exhibition on London's Heddon Street in aid of Cancer Research, O'Regan took David Bowie, Queen and Punk exhibitions on hugely successful UK tours, attracting over 5000 paying attendees to Q&A events.

A longtime charity supporter, in 2012 O'Regan collaborated with Damien Hirst on a U2 print for Cancer Research UK which raised £50,000 in 10 minutes, thanks to auctioneer Al Murray. He has held numerous events in aid of Rainbow Trust Children's Charity where guests such as Boy George, Peter Frampton and Tony Hadley performed acoustically, and donates a print every year to the Ace Africa charity.

In 2016 Denis travelled to the high Arctic with a team of explorers who walked to the North Pole to highlight global warming and the receding ice cap and O'Regan opened his first gallery in 2019, in Hammersmith West London, where he exhibits and sells limited edition fine art prints and books, and hosts events to highlight his work. In 2021 on its 150th anniversary, he was honoured to be appointed Artist In Residence at the Royal Albert Hall, the first such appointment in its history.

== Personal life ==
Denis O’Regan lives in west London with his son Rory, born in 2006.
