= Billy Boyd (footballer) =

Scottish footballer

Personal information
- Full name: William Gillespie Boyd
- Date of birth: 27 November 1905
- Place of birth: Cambuslang, Scotland
- Date of death: 14 December 1967 (aged 62)
- Place of death: Bristol, England
- Height: 5 ft 7 in (1.70 m)
- Position: Centre forward

Youth career
- Rutherglen Regent Star

Senior career*
Years	Team	Apps	(Gls)
1927–1930	Larkhall Thistle		
1930–1933	Clyde	111	(91)
1933–1935	Sheffield United	42	(30)
1935	Manchester United	6	(4)
1935–1936	Workington	?	(?)
1936	Luton Town	13	(11)
1936–1937	Southampton	19	(7)
1937–19??	Weymouth	?	(?)

International career
1931	Scotland	2	(1)
1931–1933	Scottish Football League XI	3	(3)
- * Club domestic league appearances and goals

William Gillespie Boyd (27 November 1905 – 14 December 1967) was a Scottish professional footballer who played as a centre-forward. He is most notable for playing for Clyde – during his time there he scored 91 goals in 111 league appearances and won his two Scotland caps – and Sheffield United, for whom he scored 30 goals in 42 appearances.

== Playing career ==
=== Scotland ===
Boyd was born in Cambuslang and began his career with Regent Star Rutherglen. Whilst playing for Junior side Larkhall Thistle he scored over 200 goals in three seasons. This prodigious goal-scoring form led to a transfer to Clyde. Boyd currently holds Clyde's record for the most goals in a season, scoring 32 in 1932–33. This feat got him noticed by the English clubs, and in December 1933, he was transferred to Sheffield United.

=== England ===
At Sheffield United, Boyd was a regular starter, making 22 appearances in his first season in the First Division. However, his 15 goals were not enough to save the Blades from relegation, as they finished in last place. Boyd stayed with the club as they went into Division Two, and scored another 15 goals in 20 appearances.

His goalscoring prowess was noticed by Manchester United, who signed him in February 1935. However, his tenure at Old Trafford only lasted a few months, and he was sold on to Workington in September of the same year. He moved back into the Football League set-up in December 1935 when he was signed by Luton Town. There, he scored a creditable 11 goals in only 13 appearances, before moving on to Southampton.

By the time he arrived at The Dell he was past his prime. According to Holley & Chalk, "he was renowned for having an erratic temperament (so) it was not surprising that his sojourn at the Dell was short". He made his debut on the opening day of the 1936–37 season, playing alongside fellow new signing Jimmy Dunne and Saints stalwart Arthur Holt, but he failed to live up to expectations and by January had lost his place to Dick Neal. In his brief Southampton career, he scored seven goals in 19 games, before moving on to Weymouth in August 1937, and then back to Workington, where he retired.

=== International ===
Boyd only made two appearances for Scotland, both in 1931. His international debut came on 20 May 1931 in a 3–0 loss to Italy. This was followed by a second, and final, appearance against Switzerland four days later. The match was won 3–2, with Boyd scoring the second of Scotland's three goals. He also played three times and scored three goals for the Scottish Football League XI, with all his caps coming against the Irish League representative team.
