= Kythira Strait =

Waterway in southern Greece

Coordinates: 35°50′34″N 23°13′57″E

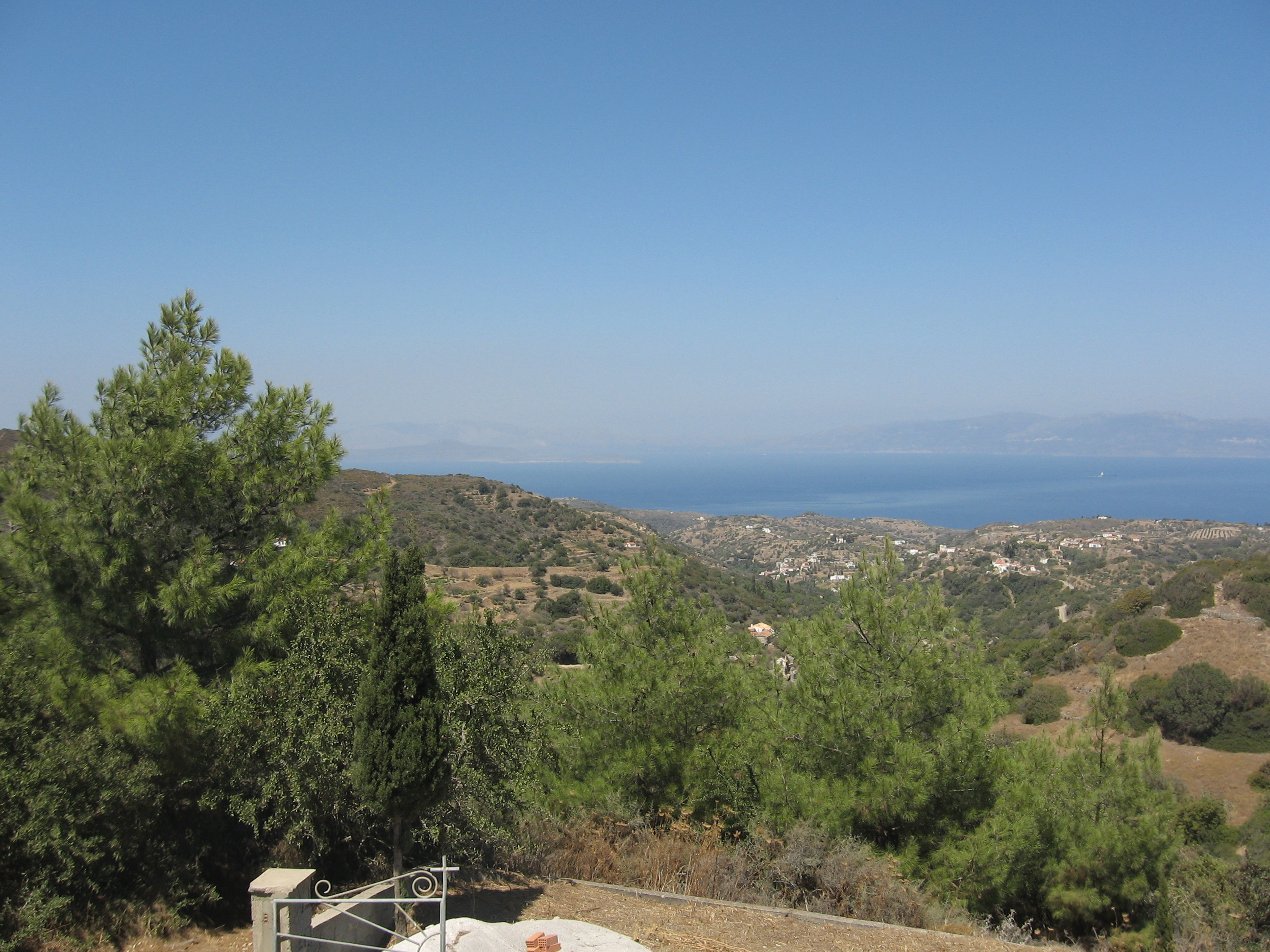
View of the Kythira Strait in the distance of southern Greece

Kythira Strait (also Kythirian Straits, Kythira–Antikythira Strait or Kithera Channel) is a waterway off Kythira in Southern Greece. The Kythira–Antikythira Strait is situated within the Western Hellenic arc. It measures approximately 100 kilometres (62 mi) in length and is situated between the Peloponnese and the island of Crete.

Many ships have sunk in the area, including HMS Greyhound (H05), HMS Gloucester (62), and SS Ivernia.

== Navigational hazard ==
The Kythira Strait represents one of the most dangerous navigational hazards in the Mediterranean. The strait between Kythera and Cape Maleas was found dangerous in ancient days by the Greek mariners. Most sea-traffic from Athens, Istanbul, and the Black Sea to the central and western Mediterranean passes through the strait and are often subject to strong winds and shipwreck on Cape Maleas. To circumvent this, the shorter and safer route via the Isthmus of Corinth has been used since classical antiquity, first through the use of the overland Diolkos pathway and in modern times, through the Corinth Canal.

== Earthquakes and tsunami ==
The Kythira Strait, located within the Western Hellenic arc, is subject to submergence on account of normal faulting which results in "extensional deformation and rotation" between two major segments of the external arc. According to Papadopoulos and Kijko, the Western Hellenic arc has high seismic activity, resulting in deformations in the strait which are active. Here the "seismic slip" recorded is on the order of 0.3 cm/year. Also reported in the strait are earthquakes at shallow and intermediate depths, with surface-wave magnitudes of up to 8.0.

The Kythira Strait's Tsunami Warning System (TWS) comprises two interrelated elements. One is based on the seismographic observations and the other is related to tide-gauge recordings.

== Bibliography ==
- Freely, John (15 May 2008). The Ionian Islands: Corfu, Cephalonia, Ithaka and Beyond. I. B. Tauris. ISBN 978-1-84511-696-5.
- Hebenstreit, Gerald T. (14 March 2013). Tsunami Research at the End of a Critical Decade. Springer Science & Business Media. ISBN 978-94-017-3618-3.
- Kensetsushō Kenchiku Kenkyūjo (1993). Individual Studies by Participants to the International Institute of Seismology and Earthquake Engineering. International Institute of Seismology and Earthquake Engineering. It is considered to be a "dextral wrench zone".
- Peters, Jeroen Martien (1985). Neogene and Quaternary vertical tectonics in the south Hellenic arc and their effect on concurrent sedimentation processes.
- Soloviev, Sergey L.; Solovieva, Olga N.; Go, Chan N.; Kim, Khen S.; Shchetnikov, Nikolay A. (14 March 2013). Tsunamis in the Mediterranean Sea 2000 B.C.-2000 A.D. Springer Science & Business Media. ISBN 978-94-015-9510-0.
