= Fred Tully =

English footballer (1907–1969)

Personal information
- Full name: Frederick Charles Arnold Tully
- Date of birth: 4 July 1907
- Place of birth: St Pancras, London, England
- Date of death: 1969 (aged 61–62)
- Height: 5 ft 6 in (1.68 m)
- Position: Winger

Youth career
- Rosehill Villa
- Preston Colliery
- Chaddleston Mental Hospital

Senior career*
Years	Team	Apps	(Gls)
1926–1933	Aston Villa	7	(0)
1933–1937	Southampton	97	(9)
1937–1939	Clapton Orient	57	(18)
- * Club domestic league appearances and goals

Frederick Charles Arnold Tully (4 July 1907 – 1969) was an English footballer who played as a winger for Southampton and Clapton Orient in the 1930s.

== Southampton ==
According to Holley & Chalk's Alphabet of the Saints he was "a winger of thrust and enterprise" who was a "busy sort of player who could play anywhere in the forward line except centre-forward". He made his debut on 26 August 1933 in the opening match of the 1933–34 season against Bradford City, before injury forced him to miss several months (with Bill Luckett standing in at outside-left).
