= Bill Kennedy (Scottish footballer) =

Scottish footballer

Personal information
- Full name: William Kennedy
- Date of birth: 2 February 1912
- Place of birth: Saltcoats, North Ayrshire, Scotland
- Date of death: 12 December 1989 (aged 77)
- Place of death: Southampton, England
- Height: 5 ft 10 in (1.78 m)
- Position: Half back

Youth career
- Royal Albert

Senior career*
Years	Team	Apps	(Gls)
1932–1933	Portsmouth	1	(0)
1933–1935	Carlisle United	8	(0)
1935–1936	Crewe Alexandra	6	(0)
1936–1938	Southampton	43	(0)
1938–1939	Hamilton Academical		
- * Club domestic league appearances and goals

William Kennedy (2 February 1912 – 12 December 1989) was a Scottish professional footballer who played as a half back with various clubs in the 1930s.

== Playing career ==
Kennedy was born in Saltcoats, North Ayrshire, Scotland but by 1932 he was a junior player on the south coast of England at Portsmouth. He made a solitary appearance for Portsmouth in their 1931–32 First Division campaign before moving north to Carlisle United in July 1933. He made a handful of appearances for Carlisle before moving in September 1935 to join fellow Third Division North side Crewe Alexandra.

In August 1936 he was one of several players signed by Southampton manager George Goss as he attempted to rebuild the team that had struggled for several years in the Second Division. Kennedy formed a useful partnership with fellow half-backs Cyril King and Billy Kingdon, but once again the Saints struggled to avoid relegation, finishing 19th in the table. Described by Saints historians Holley & Chalk as "a reliable centre-half" he retained his place at the start of the following season before being replaced by David Affleck at the end of September, as new manager Tom Parker re-organised the side following a run of seven games at the start of the season in which Saints lost four and drew three. He spent most of the rest of the season in the reserves, although he was drafted in as an inside forward for the final two games of the season, replacing Ted Bates. In May 1938 he refused a new contract and moved back to Scotland.

After a period with Hamilton Academical, he returned to Southampton and joined the merchant navy serving on RMS Queen Mary. In 1962 he left the service and settled in Southampton working at Mullard in Millbrook. He died in Southampton in 1989, aged 77.
