= Bobby Dunne =

Australian boxer

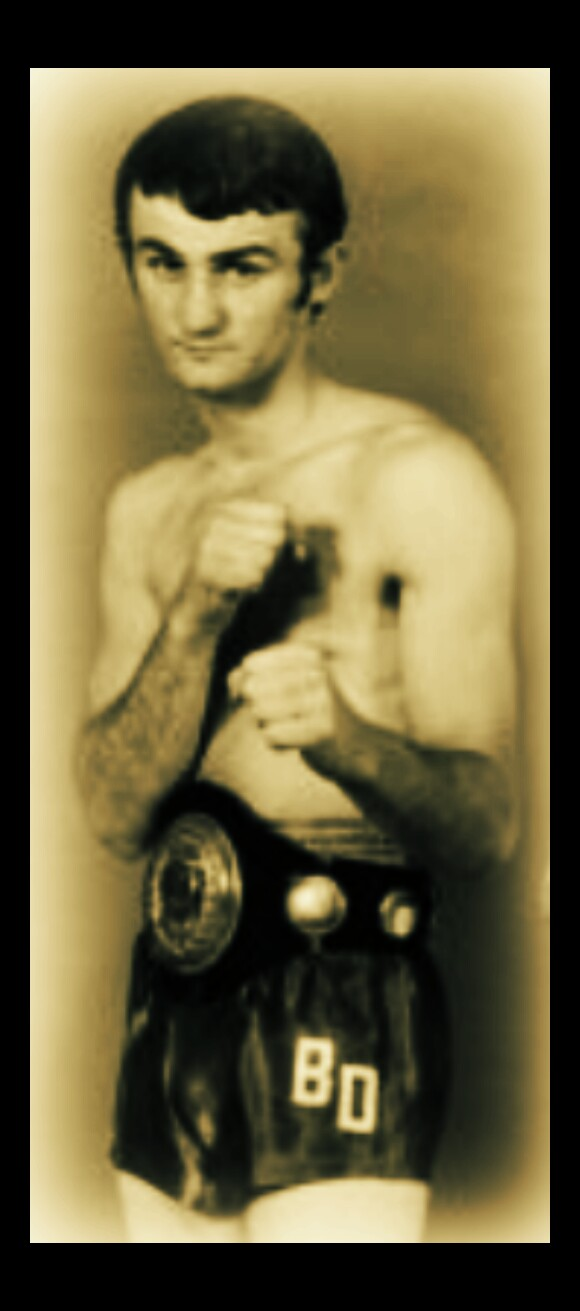

Personal information
- Nationality: Australian
- Born: 28 March 1949 Carlton, Australia
- Died: 13 November 1998 (aged 49)
- Weight: feather/super featherweight

Boxing career

Boxing record
- Total fights: 25
- Wins: 20 (KO 5)
- Losses: 3 (KO 1)
- Draws: 1
- No contests: 1

Bobby Dunne (28 March 1949 – 13 November 1998 (aged 49) was an Australian professional feather/super featherweight boxer of the 1960s and '70s who won the Commonwealth featherweight title, his professional fighting weight varied from 124 lb (56 kg; 8 st 12 lb), i.e. featherweight to 129 lb (59 kg; 9 st 3 lb), i.e. super featherweight.
