= Billy Moore (footballer, born 1912) =

Welsh footballer

Personal information
- Full name: William Albert Moore
- Date of birth: 14 October 1912
- Place of birth: Llanbradach, Wales
- Date of death: 2002 (aged 89–90)
- Position: Left half

Senior career*
Years	Team	Apps	(Gls)
1934	Cardiff City	11	(0)
1935	Southampton	0	(0)
1936	Wolverhampton Wanderers	0	(0)

International career
1935	Wales Amateurs	1	(0)
- * Club domestic league appearances and goals

William Albert Moore (14 October 1912 – 2002) was a Welsh amateur footballer who played in the Football League for Cardiff City as a left half. He was capped by Wales at amateur level.
