= Brian O'Regan =

Brian O'Regan may refer to:

- Brian O'Regan (chemist), co-inventor of dye-sensitised solar cells
- Brian O'Regan (Gaelic footballer) (born 1983), Irish Gaelic footballer
