= Tommy Dunne (footballer, born 1932) =

Irish footballer (1932–2015)

Personal information
- Full name: Thomas Dunne
- Date of birth: 1932
- Place of birth: Dublin, Ireland
- Date of death: 15 May 2015 (aged 82–83)
- Position: Right-half

Senior career*
Years	Team	Apps	(Gls)
1950–1951	Johnville		
1951–1954	Shamrock Rovers	?	(2)
1953–1954	→ Jacobs (loan)		
1954–1963	St Patrick's Athletic	?	(13)
1963–1964	Dundalk	?	(?)
1964–1966	Sligo Rovers	46	(2)
1966–1967	Dundalk	?	(0)
1967–1968	Transport		

International career
1956	Republic of Ireland	3	(0)
- * Club domestic league appearances and goals

Tommy Dunne (1932 – 15 May 2015) was an Irish international footballer.

== Career ==
He began his senior career as an inside forward with Shamrock Rovers in 1951. However, when the Hoops won the league championship in 1953–54, Dunne was playing in the Leinster Senior League, although he had been kept on as a Rovers player.

At the end of that season he left Milltown to join St Patricks Athletic. The son of Jimmy Dunne, who played for Arsenal in the 1930s, he helped St Pats take the league crown from Rovers in 1954–55, and helped them retain it the following year.

Dunne's form for Pats saw him win full international honours. He made his Ireland debut against Holland in Rotterdam's Feijenoord Stadion in May 1956 in a 4–1 win . They also won the two other times he played for his country, against Denmark and West Germany in 1956. He also won 2 'B' caps in 1958.

As the captain of St Pats he led the club to success in two FAI Cup finals in 1959 and 1961. He transferred to Dundalk for the 1963/64 season, but spent much of the season in the reserve team. In the summer of 1964, Dunne moved to the north west and joined Sligo Rovers. Two years later he moved back to Dundalk, whom he helped win the league in 1966–67.

Dunne died on 15 May 2015 after a short illness.
