= Billy Kingdon =

English footballer and manager

Personal information
- Full name: William Issacher Garfield Kingdon
- Date of birth: 25 June 1907
- Place of birth: Worcester, England
- Date of death: 18 March 1977 (aged 69)
- Place of death: Weymouth, England
- Height: 5 ft 9 in (1.75 m)
- Position: Half back

Youth career
- Kepex (Worcester)

Senior career*
Years	Team	Apps	(Gls)
1924–1925	Kidderminster Harriers		
1925–1936	Aston Villa	223	(5)
1936–1938	Southampton	49	(1)
1938–1946	Yeovil & Petters United		

International career
1926	England Junior	1	(0)

Managerial career
- 1938–1946: Yeovil & Petters United
- 1947–1948: Weymouth
- * Club domestic league appearances and goals

William Issacher Garfield Kingdon (25 June 1907 – 18 March 1977) was an English footballer who played, as a wing-half, over 240 games for Aston Villa. Towards the end of his career, he joined Southampton, before becoming a manager in lower-league football.

== Playing career ==
=== Aston Villa ===
Kingdon was born in Worcester and after playing for Kidderminster Harriers, joined Aston Villa in 1925. In his time at Villa Park, Villa were moderately successful, reaching the Football League runners-up position twice, in 1930–31 and 1932–33, and the FA Cup semi-final in 1933–34. After this there came a period of decline, culminating in relegation in 1935–36, thereby becoming the last of the founder members of the football league to lose top flight status for the first time. Kingdon left Villa 1936 to join Southampton

=== Southampton ===
At Southampton he displayed "a nice line in distribution and looked to be an asset". In 1936–37 he formed a useful partnership with fellow half-backs Bill Kennedy and Cyril King and only missed one game, although Southampton struggled near the bottom of the Second Division. He briefly became team captain until, in September 1937, new manager Tom Parker acquired the services of Scottish international Frank Hill, who had won the Football League title three times with Arsenal (in 1932–33, 1933–34 and 1934–35). Hill immediately took over both the captaincy and Bill's No. 6 shirt, and after Hill's arrival, Kingdon only made one further appearance, and in January 1938 joined Yeovil & Petters United as player-manager.

=== Yeovil Town ===
He remained with Yeovil for the duration of World War II, but in 1946 he returned to his trade as a carpenter. In 1947 he accepted the position as manager at Weymouth, combining this with running the Fountain Hotel in Weymouth.

He died in Weymouth in March 1977, aged 69.
