= Wilf Mayer =

English footballer

Personal information
- Full name: Wilfred Mayer
- Date of birth: 18 February 1912
- Place of birth: Stoke-on-Trent, England
- Date of death: April 1979 (aged 67)
- Place of death: Stoke-on-Trent, England
- Height: 5 ft 6 in (1.68 m)
- Position: Inside right

Youth career
- Newcastle PSA
- Downings Tileries

Senior career*
Years	Team	Apps	(Gls)
1932–1937	Stoke City	1	(0)
1937–1938	Southampton	14	(0)
1938–????	Wellington Town		
- * Club domestic league appearances and goals

Wilf Mayer (18 February 1912 – April 1979) was an English professional footballer who played at inside-right for Southampton in the late 1930s, before joining Wellington Town where he won a Welsh Cup winner's medal in 1940.

== Football career ==
Mayer was born in Stoke-on-Trent, and after playing for local works teams, Newcastle PSA and Downings Tileries, he signed as a professional with Stoke City in August 1932. Mayer spent most of his career at Stoke in the reserves, making only one first-team appearance in the 1934–35 season which came in a 1–0 defeat at home to Chelsea on 9 March 1935.

In March 1937, he was one of the first signings by Southampton's new manager Tom Parker for a fee of £650. A nippy forward, at home both on the wing or at inside-forward, Mayer was immediately drafted into the first-team to replace the injured Dick Neal. Although Neal returned after a few matches, Mayer retained the inside-right shirt for the remainder of the season.

In the following season, the signing of players such as Ray Parkin and Ted Bates restricted Mayer's appearances to five matches. Mayer was placed on the transfer list at a fee of £500, but the club were unable to attract any offers from Football League teams even when the fee was later halved.

Eventually, Mayer joined Wellington Town of the Cheshire County League, remaining with them long enough to win a Welsh Cup winner's medal in 1940 when they defeated Swansea Town 4–1.

== Career statistics ==
Club	Season	League			FA Cup		Total	
Club	Season	Division	Apps	Goals	Apps	Goals	Apps	Goals
Stoke City	1934–35	First Division	1	0	0	0	1	0
Southampton	1936–37	Second Division	9	0	0	0	9	0
Southampton	1937–38	Second Division	5	0	0	0	5	0
Career total			15	0	0	0	15	0

== Honours ==
Wellington Town

- Welsh Cup winner: 1940
