= Thomas L. Dunne =

American book publisher

- Born: 1946 (age 79–80); Providence, Rhode Island, U.S.
- Education: Brown University; Columbia University
- Occupation: Publisher
- Employer: St. Martin's Press
- Spouse: Mary
- Children: Thomas Michael Dunne
- Website: Thomas Dunne Books

Thomas L. Dunne (born July 30, 1946) is an American book publisher. He holds the title of publisher at Thomas Dunne Books, founded in 1986, and is an executive Vice President at St. Martin's Press where he has worked since 1971. Known for his "breezy" and "irreverent" attitude, Mr. Dunne has developed a reputation as a mentor to young editors while creating one of St. Martin's most profitable imprints.

== Early life and education ==
Thomas L. Dunne was born in 1946 in Providence, Rhode Island to Leo Dunne, an accountant, and Cecilia Elizabeth Dunne, a schoolteacher. He received a B.A. in history from Brown University in 1968, an M.A. in history from Columbia University in 1969 and a M.Phil. from Columbia in 1971.

== Career ==
Thomas Dunne began his career in publishing while attending graduate school at Columbia. He worked as director of college book sales for Penguin Books until 1971 when he was hired as an editor at St. Martin's Press. Both as an editor at St. Martin's and then as a distinct imprint of the firm (beginning in 1986) Dunne and his editorial staff (eleven strong as of 2014)have published thousands of books. In recent years, Thomas Dunne Books has averaged between 100 and 150 titles per year. This list includes both fiction and non-fiction, and has long been open to first books as well as titles from established authors. Thomas Dunne Books is, according to The Boston Herald one of the "few remaining imprints to reflect the distinct character of its publisher."

== Personal life ==
On March 8, 1969, Dunne married Mary Morabito at City Hall in New York. They have one son, named Thomas M. Dunne, a sports writer.

== Works ==
- Ellis Island (1971), a work of history novel
- The Scourge (1978), a medical thriller novel
- Irish Erotic Art (1981), a humor book written under the pseudonym Seamus O'Gallagher McGuire Cork, which was a best seller
- "Brace Yourself, Bridget! The Official Irish Sex Manual (1982), a humor book written under the pseudonym Ian Plaid.
