= Tommy Dunne (footballer, born 1927) =

Irish footballer (1927–1988)

Personal information
- Full name: Thomas Dunne
- Date of birth: 19 March 1927
- Place of birth: Dublin, Ireland
- Date of death: 23 January 1988 (aged 60)
- Place of death: Fazakerley, England
- Position: Wing-half

Senior career*
Years	Team	Apps	(Gls)
1947–1949	Shamrock Rovers		(3)
1949–1954	Leicester City	33	(0)
1954–1956	Exeter City	37	(1)
1956–1957	Shrewsbury Town	3	(0)
1957–1958	Southport	21	(0)
Total		94	(4)
- * Club domestic league appearances and goals

Thomas Dunne (19 March 1927 – 23 January 1988) is an Irish former footballer who played as a wing-half.

Dunne was born in Dublin. He was a nephew of the famed Jimmy Dunne. He began his senior career with Shamrock Rovers in 1949.

During his time at Milltown he won the FAI Cup despite being sent off in a first round tie.

In November 1949 Tommy transferred to Leicester City.

== Personal life ==
Following the end of his playing career, he settled in Southport where he ran two public houses, the Hoghton Arms and the Masons' Arms until retiring through ill health in 1983. He died of throat cancer in hospital at Fazakerley, Liverpool in 1988 aged 60.

== Sources ==
- Paul Doolan; Robert Goggins. The Hoops. ISBN 0-7171-2121-6.
