= Jimmy Dunne (footballer, born 1905) =

Irish footballer and manager

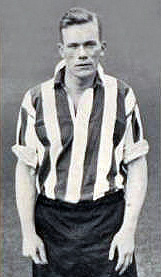

Personal information
- Full name: James Dunne
- Date of birth: 4 September 1905
- Place of birth: Ringsend, Dublin, Ireland
- Date of death: 14 November 1949 (aged 44)
- Place of death: Dublin, Ireland
- Height: 5 ft 10 in (1.78 m)
- Position: Forward

Youth career
- Parkview
- Riverside Athletic

Senior career*
| Years | Team | Apps | (Gls) |
| 1923–1925 | Shamrock Rovers B | ? | (?) |
| 1925–1926 | New Brighton | 8 | (6) |
| 1926–1934 | Sheffield United | 173 | (143) |
| 1934–1936 | Arsenal | 28 | (10) |
| 1936–1937 | Southampton | 36 | (14) |
| 1937–1942 | Shamrock Rovers | 87 | (52) |
| Total | | 332 | (225) |

International career
| 1928–1932 | Ireland (IFA) | 7 | (4) |
| 1930–1939 | Ireland (FAI) | 15 | (13) |
| 1939–1942 | League of Ireland XI | 6 | (2) |

Managerial career
- 1937–1942: Shamrock Rovers
- 1942–1947: Bohemians
- 1947–1949: Shamrock Rovers
- * Club domestic league appearances and goals

James Dunne (4 September 1905 – 14 November 1949) was an Irish footballer who played for, among others, Shamrock Rovers, Sheffield United, Arsenal and Southampton. Dunne was also a dual internationalist and played for both Ireland teams: the FAI XI and the IFA XI.

Dunne was the first Irishman to figure prominently in the English League scoring records. In the 1930–31 season he scored 41 league goals for Sheffield United. This became a club record and remains the most league goals scored by an Irishman during a single English League season.

In the 1931–32 season, he scored in 12 consecutive matches, a record until Stan Mortensen scored in 15 for Blackpool in the 1950–51 season. Dunne also scored 30 or more First Division goals in three consecutive seasons between 1930 and 1933. He excelled at either centre forward or inside forward and was outstanding with his head. On 27 September 1930, he scored a hat-trick of headers against Portsmouth. He was a fringe member of the great Arsenal side of the 1930s before spending a season at Southampton and then finishing his career at Shamrock Rovers.

Dunne died suddenly from a heart attack, at the age of 44, on 14 November 1949. His two sons, Tommy and Jimmy, also played in the League of Ireland for St. Patrick's Athletic. Tommy also played for Shamrock Rovers. His nephew, another Tommy Dunne, also played for Rovers and another nephew Christy Doyle, played for Shelbourne and the Republic of Ireland.

== Club career ==
=== Early years ===
Dunne initially played junior football. However, his career was put on hold during the Irish Civil War when he was interned by the Irish Free State authorities for alleged Republican sympathies. His brother, Christy, was an active Republican. He subsequently joined Shamrock Rovers and played a number of games for the club's senior team. A scout recommended him to New Brighton, then playing in the English Third Division North. Dunne joined New Brighton in November 1925 and made an instant impact, scoring six goals in eight league games.

=== Sheffield United ===
Dunne soon attracted the interest of First Division side Sheffield United who signed him in February 1926 for £800. However, this marked the start of another apprenticeship in the reserves. He made his first team debut in a 4–0 home win against Arsenal on 4 September 1926 but he struggled to hold a regular place and in his first three seasons played just eleven league games. His first goal came against Derby County on 15 October 1927. Dunne had to wait three years before he became an established member of the United team and at one stage, they put him on the transfer list. It was not until the 1929–30 season that Dunne became a goalscoring sensation. His first hat-trick against Leicester City in a 3–3 draw on 7 September 1929 was followed by successive four-goal hauls against West Ham United on New Year's Day (4–2) and Leicester City (7–1) three days later. He scored another hat-trick against Blackburn Rovers on 3 March. He finished the season as the club's top goalscorer with 36 goals in 39 games and his goals helped United avoid relegation on goal average.

Dunne was subsequently top goalscorer at United for four consecutive seasons between 1929 and 1933. This included scoring over 30 First Division goals in three consecutive seasons between 1930 and 1933. His best season was 1930–31, when he scored 41 league goals plus a further nine in other competitions; his 41-goal haul remains the record tally in the English League by an Irishman.

=== Arsenal ===
Dunne's goalscoring form with Sheffield United soon attracted the interest of Arsenal. In early 1932 they offered United £10,000 for Dunne but were turned down. However, in September 1933, after United hit financial trouble, they accepted a reduced fee of £8,250. Dunne made his debut for Arsenal against Middlesbrough on 30 September 1933 in a 6–0 win and went on to score 9 goals in 23 league games during the 1933–34 season, helping Arsenal win the First Division title. However, the arrival of Ted Drake in the summer of 1934 saw Dunne lose his place in the Arsenal first team, and he would only play another 8 games over the next two seasons. Dunne was dubbed "the most expensive reserve player in English football" in the press, although his Arsenal colleagues clearly recognised his talents, with Cliff Bastin remarking he was "one of the best five centre forwards I had ever seen".

=== Southampton ===
In July 1936 Dunne signed for Southampton where he was nicknamed "Snowy" by the fans because of his fair hair. Described as "dangerous in the air (with) a short striding run which enabled him to retain his balance in quick moves near the goal", he was the Saints' leading scorer during the 1936–37 season, scoring 14 league goals in 36 games, helping Southampton to avoid relegation to the Third Division.

At the end of the season, Dunne turned down the opportunity to renew his contract at Southampton and opted to return to Shamrock Rovers. Eighteen months after leaving the club, Dunne was given a rousing salute by Southampton dockers as he passed through the port with the Ireland team.

=== Shamrock Rovers ===
In 1937 Dunne returned to Shamrock Rovers as player-manager and was the inspiration behind Rovers winning League of Ireland titles in 1938 and 1939. He won nine caps during this spell at Milltown. He also helped Rovers win the FAI Cup in 1940. The reserves had won the Leinster Senior League Division 1 title that season and they were coached by Dunne whose first medal with Rovers was the Leinster Senior League Division 1.

On 31 August 1942, Rovers played Belfast Celtic in a testimonial for Dunne which ended in a 2–2 draw. Dunne went on to coach Bohemians between 1942 and 1947 before returning to Rovers once again.

== International career ==
When Dunne began his international career in 1928 there were, in effect, two Ireland teams, chosen by two rival associations. Both associations, the Northern Ireland – based IFA and the Irish Free State – based FAI claimed jurisdiction over the whole of Ireland and selected players from the whole island. As a result, several notable Irish players from this era, including Dunne, played for both teams.

=== IFA XI ===
Between 1928 and 1932 Dunne made 7 appearances and scored 4 goals for the IFA XI. Dunne made his debut for the IFA XI on 2 February 1928 in a 2–1 defeat against Wales. He won his second cap for the IFA XI on 20 October 1930 against England and scored in a 5–1 defeat. During 1931 he scored a further three goals for the IFA XI and as a result scored 4 goals in four consecutive appearances.

=== FAI XI ===
Between 1930 and 1939 Dunne also made 15 appearances and scored 13 goals for the FAI XI. He made his debut for the FAI XI on 11 May 1930 in an away game against Belgium. Dunne marked his debut with a brilliant all round performance, scoring twice in a 3–1 win. He also scored on his home debut for the FAI XI on 17 March 1936 in a 1–0 win against Switzerland. In May 1936, during a European tour, he scored five goals for the FAI XI. On 3 May he scored twice in a 3–3 draw with Hungary. On 3 May he also scored in a 4–1 defeat to a Rhineland XI and then on 9 May scored twice in a 5–1 win against Luxembourg. On 10 October 1937, Dunne scored for the FAI XI in a World Cup qualifier against Norway. Norway, who won the game 3–2, later complained that Dunne was ineligible, having played for the IFA XI, who were not members of FIFA. The complaint was subsequently withdrawn and on 7 November, Dunne scored in the return which finished as a 3–3 draw. He scored his last goal for the FAI XI in a 3–2 win over Poland on 13 November 1938 and made his final appearance against Germany on 23 May 1939.

== Career statistics ==
Appearances and goals by club, season and competition
| Club | Season | League | | | FA Cup | | Other | | Total | |
| Club | Season | Division | Apps | Goals | Apps | Goals | Apps | Goals | Apps | Goals |
|---|---|---|---|---|---|---|---|---|---|---|
| New Brighton | 1925–26 | Div 3 North | 8 | 6 | 0 | 0 | 0 | 0 | 8 | 6 |
| Sheffield United | 1926–27 | First Division | 1 | 0 | 0 | 0 | 0 | 0 | 1 | 0 |
| Sheffield United | 1927–28 | First Division | 8 | 1 | 0 | 0 | 1 | 1 | 9 | 2 |
| Sheffield United | 1928–29 | First Division | 2 | 2 | 0 | 0 | 0 | 0 | 2 | 0 |
| Sheffield United | 1929–30 | First Division | 39 | 36 | 2 | 2 | 2 | 4 | 43 | 42 |
| Sheffield United | 1930–31 | First Division | 41 | 41 | 4 | 5 | 2 | 4 | 47 | 50 |
| Sheffield United | 1931–32 | First Division | 37 | 33 | 2 | 2 | 1 | 0 | 40 | 35 |
| Sheffield United | 1932–33 | First Division | 40 | 26 | 2 | 2 | 1 | 4 | 43 | 32 |
| Sheffield United | 1933–34 | First Division | 5 | 4 | 0 | 0 | 0 | 0 | 5 | 4 |
| Sheffield United | Total | | 173 | 143 | 10 | 11 | 7 | 13 | 190 | 167 |
| Arsenal | 1933–34 | First Division | 21 | 9 | 4 | 3 | 0 | 0 | 25 | 12 |
| Arsenal | 1934–35 | First Division | 1 | 0 | 0 | 0 | 1 | 0 | 2 | 0 |
| Arsenal | 1935–36 | First Division | 6 | 1 | 0 | 0 | 0 | 0 | 6 | 1 |
| Arsenal | Total | | 28 | 10 | 4 | 3 | 1 | 0 | 33 | 13 |
| Southampton | 1936–37 | Second Division | 36 | 14 | 1 | 0 | 0 | 0 | 37 | 14 |
| | Career | | 245 | 173 | 15 | 14 | 8 | 13 | 268 | 200 |

== Honours ==
=== Player ===
Shamrock Rovers

- League of Ireland: 1937–38, 1938–39
- FAI Cup: 1940
- League of Ireland Shield: 1924–25, 1937–38, 1941–42
- Leinster Senior Cup: 1938

Arsenal

- First Division: 1933–34

=== Coach ===
Shamrock Rovers

- League of Ireland: 1937–38, 1938–39
- FAI Cup: 1939–40, 1947–48
- League of Ireland Shield: 1937–38, 1941–42
- LFA President's Cup: 1940–41, 1941–42, 1948–49
- Dublin City Cup: 1947–48
- Dublin and Belfast Inter-City Cup: 1948–49
- Leinster Senior Cup: 1937–38

Bohemians

- Dublin and Belfast Intercity Cup: 1945

=== Individual ===
- First Division Golden Boot: 1930
