= George Goss =

English footballer and manager

Personal information
- Full name: George William Semple Goss
- Date of birth: 29 June 1893
- Place of birth: Marchwood, Hampshire, England
- Date of death: 22 May 1967 (aged 73)
- Place of death: Westminster, London, England

Managerial career
- Years: Team
- 1936–1937: Southampton

George William Semple Goss (29 June 1893 – 22 May 1967) was a naval officer and football manager, who was manager of Southampton F.C. for the 1936–37 season.

== Family ==
George Goss was born in Marchwood, Hampshire on 29 June 1893, the son of William and Charlotte (Semple) Goss. He was baptised at St. John's Church, Marchwood on 6 August 1893.

On 25 May 1921, at St Michael's Church, Pimlico, London, 27-year old George Goss married 25-year old Lucy World.

== Service with Royal Navy ==
Goss enlisted in the Royal Navy on 25 May 1909, shortly before his 16th birthday, signing on for 12 years' service on his 18th birthday, 29 June 1911. He served throughout the First World War, eventually retiring from the Royal Navy on 7 December 1921 with the rank of Petty Officer.

He played football for the naval side between 1916 and 1921.

== Southampton FC ==
On leaving the navy, he joined the staff of Southampton F.C. as assistant secretary to Ernest Arnfield, taking over as secretary on Arnfield's retirement.

Following Jimmy McIntyre's surprise resignation as a manager in December 1924, Goss assumed responsibility for team affairs under the supervision of the board of directors for the remainder of the season, continuing into the following season until Arthur Chadwick took over the manager's position in October 1925. During the period when he was acting as manager, the Saints embarked on a run in the FA Cup, defeating Liverpool in round 4, to reach the semi-final at Stamford Bridge, where they were defeated 2–0 by Sheffield United on 28 March 1925. In the semi-final, Tom Parker had a dreadful afternoon, first scoring an own-goal, then suffering a rare miss from the penalty spot (shooting straight at the 'keeper) before a mix-up between him and goalkeeper Tommy Allen gave Sheffield their second goal.

In June 1936, the club was suffering severe financial difficulties, and the entire board of directors resigned. The new board of directors asked manager George Kay to leave in order to trim the payroll, and in August, Kay moved on to Liverpool, taking long-serving trainer Bert Shelley with him. Goss then combined the roles of secretary and manager, with club captain Johnny McIlwaine taking on the role of assistant manager.

Following the upheavals in the boardroom, the club was able to raise sufficient finances to purchase new players, most prominent of whom was the former Irish international forward Jimmy Dunne who was signed from Arsenal for a reported fee of £1,000.

The 1936–37 season was not an outstanding success and Saints struggled to avoid relegation from Division 2. On 16 January 1937, Saints played Sunderland in a first round FA Cup tie. Although Saints lost 2–3, this game was attended by a crowd of 30,380 which remained an all-time record attendance at The Dell.

By March, Goss and McIlwaine were feeling the pressure and Goss resigned his position as manager and in March 1937 was replaced by former Saints and Arsenal player Tom Parker.

== Later life ==
At the end of the 1936–37 season, Goss left the club completely, after over 13 years service, initially to run the Railway Hotel in St Denys. On the outbreak of World War II, he joined the Royal Naval Volunteer Reserve with the rank of acting lieutenant-commander taking command of a minesweeper before emigrating to Australia.

He returned to England in 1959 and died in Westminster, London on 22 May 1967.
