= Dunn (surname) =

Origin
- Meaning: Middle English word meaning "dark", or Scottish for an inhabitant of Dun, Angus
- Region of origin: England, Scotland

Other names
- Variant forms: Dun, Dunne, Doune, Donne

Dunn is a surname of English and Scottish origins. It has several different origins. Typically the origin of the surname Dunn is from the Middle English dunn, meaning "dark-coloured"; this name originated as a nickname for one with dark hair. Another origin is from a habitative name, derived from Dun in Angus, Scotland; this place name is derived from the Scottish Gaelic dùn, meaning "fort". Another origin is from the Gaelic donn, meaning "brown".

== Notable people with the surname ==
=== A ===
- Adam Dunn (born 1979), American baseball player
- Alan Dunn (baseball) (born 1961), American baseball player
- Alan Dunn (cartoonist) (1900–1974), American cartoonist
- Albert Dunn (1864–1937), British politician
- Albert T. Dunn (1842–1916), Canadian politician
- Alby Dunn (1941–2009), Australian rules footballer
- Alexander Dunn (disambiguation), multiple people
- Alexandra Dunn (born 1967), American lawyer
- Aliyah Dunn (born 1999), New Zealand netball player
- Anderson Dunn (born 1944), British police officer
- Andrew Dunn (disambiguation), multiple people
- Andy Dunn (born 1979), American entrepreneur
- Anita Dunn (born 1958), American political strategist
- Anne Dunn (born 1929), British artist
- Antony Dunn (born 1973), English poet
- April Dunn (1986–2020), American activist
- Archibald Dunn (1876–1943), Scottish footballer
- Archibald Matthias Dunn (1832–1917), English architect
- Arlene Dunn, Canadian politician
- Arthur Dunn (disambiguation), multiple people
- Aubert C. Dunn (1896–1987), American attorney
- Aubrey Dunn Sr. (1928–2012), American politician
- Aubrey Dunn Jr. (born 1956), American politician
- Aura K. Dunn, American politician

=== B ===
- Barrie Dunn (born 1952), Canadian actor
- Barry Dunn (born 1952), English footballer
- Beau Dunn (born 1987), American visual artist
- Ben Dunn (born 1964), American comic book artist
- Bernard J. Dunn (1924–2009), American entrepreneur
- Bernie Dunn (1944–2018), Australian politician
- Betsy Dunn, American politician
- Beverley Dunn, Australian actress
- Beverley Dunn (set decorator), Australian set decorator
- Bill Dunn (disambiguation), multiple people
- Billy Dunn (disambiguation), multiple people
- Blake Dunn (born 1998), American baseball player
- Blanche Dunn (1911–??), American socialite
- Bob Dunn (disambiguation), multiple people
- Bobby Dunn (1890–1937), American actor
- Boyd Dunn, German-American politician
- Brandon Dunn (born 1992), American football player
- Brian Dunn (disambiguation), multiple people
- Bud Dunn (1918–2001), American horse trainer

=== C ===
- Cameron Dunn (born 1984), American soccer player
- Carola Dunn (born 1946), British-American writer
- Carolyn Dunn (born 1960), Canadian actress
- Cary Dunn (1732–??), American silversmith
- Casey Dunn (born 1976), American baseball coach
- Casey Dunn (American football) (born 1994), American football player
- Catherine Dunn (disambiguation), multiple people
- Cathy Dunn (born 1949), American politician
- Charles Dunn (disambiguation), multiple people
- Cheryl Dunn, American filmmaker
- Christopher Dunn (disambiguation), multiple people
- Cindy Dunn, American politician
- Claire Dunn (1915–1996), American football coach
- Clara Dunn (1869–1960), Irish-Canadian nurse
- Clare Dunn (born 1987), American musician
- Cletus Dunn (born 1948), Canadian politician
- Clive Dunn (1920–2012), British actor
- Colton Dunn (born 1977), American comedian
- Conrad Dunn, American actor
- Coye Dunn (1916–2000), American football player
- Craig Dunn, American business professor
- Crawford Dunn (1918–1980), American designer
- Crystal Dunn (born 1992), American soccer player

=== D ===
- Daisy Dunn (born 1987), English author
- Damon Dunn (born 1976), American politician
- Dan Dunn (disambiguation), multiple people
- Dave Dunn (born 1948), Canadian ice hockey player
- Dave Dunn (American football) (born 1965), American football coach
- David Dunn (disambiguation), multiple people
- Debbie Dunn (born 1978), American sprinter
- Declan Dunn (born 2000), English footballer
- Derek Dunn (born 1995), American dancer
- Desmond Robert Dunn (1929–2003), Australian author
- Donald Dunn (1941–2012), American guitarist
- Donald G. Dunn (1923–2021), American soldier
- Dorothy Dunn (1903–1992), American art instructor
- Douglas Dunn (1942–2026), Scottish poet
- Douglas Dunn (choreographer) (born 1942), American choreographer
- Dwayne Dunn (born 1973/1974), Australian jockey

=== E ===
- Eddie Dunn (disambiguation), multiple people
- Edward Dunn (disambiguation), multiple people
- Edwina Dunn (born 1958), English entrepreneur
- Elaine Dunn (born 1933/1934), American singer
- Elizabeth Dunn (born 1978), Canadian psychologist
- Emily Dunn (disambiguation), multiple people
- Emma Dunn (1875–1966), English actress
- Emmett Reid Dunn (1894–1956), American zoologist
- Eric Dunn (1927–2008), British air force officer
- Eric Dunn (cricketer) (1929–2015), New Zealand cricketer
- Everett Dunn (1892–1980), American engineer

=== F ===
- Fayette S. Dunn (1903–1979), American corporate executive
- Floyd Dunn (1924–2015), American electrical engineer
- Francis Dunn (disambiguation), multiple people
- Frank Dunn, Canadian corporate executive
- Frank K. Dunn (1854–1940), American jurist
- Fred Dunn, Australian rules footballer
- Frederic Stanley Dunn (1872–1937), American scholar
- Frederick Dunn (disambiguation), multiple people

=== G ===
- Gabe Dunn (born 1988), American writer
- Gano Dunn (1870–1953), American corporate executive
- Gary Dunn (born 1953), American football player
- Gary Dunn (American football coach), American football coach
- Ged Dunn (1946–2021), English rugby union footballer
- Geoff Dunn (born 1961), English drummer
- Geoffrey Dunn (writer), American writer, journalist, and film producer and director
- Geoffrey Thomas Dunn (1902–1981), English tenor, actor, librettist, director and translator
- George Dunn (disambiguation), multiple people
- Gerald R. Dunn (1934–2005), American politician
- Gerold C. Dunn (1911–1980), American attorney
- Gertrude Dunn (1932–2004), American baseball player
- Gordon Dunn (1912–1964), American discus thrower
- Graham Dunn (1950–1973), Australian swimmer

=== H ===
- Hailey Dunn (1997–2010), American murder victim
- Halbert L. Dunn (1896–1975), American social figure
- Hannah Dunn (born 1991), Australian rules footballer
- Harry Dunn (disambiguation), multiple people
- Harvey Dunn (disambiguation), multiple people
- Hedley Allen Dunn (1865–1942), Australian architect
- Henry Dunn (disambiguation), multiple people
- Herbert Dunn (disambiguation), multiple people
- Hester Dunn (born 1940), Northern Irish activist
- Holly Dunn (1957–2016), American singer
- Howard H. Dunn (1867–1942), American politician
- Hubert Dunn (1933–2020), Northern Irish judge
- Hugh Alexander Dunn (1923–2005), Australian diplomat
- Hughie Dunn (1875–??), Scottish footballer

=== I ===
- Iain Dunn (born 1970), English footballer
- Ian Dunn (disambiguation), multiple people
- Irina Dunn (born 1948), Australian writer
- Isaiah Dunn (born 1999), American football player

=== J ===
- Jack Dunn (disambiguation), multiple people
- Jacob Piatt Dunn (1855–1924), American historian
- Jacqui Dunn (born 1984), Australian artistic gymnast
- Jake Dunn (1909–1984), American baseball player
- J. Allan Dunn (1872–1941), American writer
- Jan Dunn (born 1963), British filmmaker
- Jan Dunn (ceramicist) (1940–2002), Australian ceramicist
- Jarryd Dunn (born 1992), English sprinter
- J. C. Dunn (1871–1955), British medical officer
- Jeffrey Dunn (born 1961), British guitarist
- Jeffrey D. Dunn, American broadcast executive
- Jerry Dunn (disambiguation), multiple people
- James Dunn (disambiguation), multiple people
- Jamie Dunn (1950–2026), Australian comedian
- Jancee Dunn (born 1966), American journalist
- Jason Dunn (disambiguation), multiple people
- Jean Dunn (disambiguation), multiple people
- Jennifer Dunn (1941–2007), American politician
- Jim Dunn (disambiguation), multiple people
- Joe Dunn (disambiguation), multiple people
- John Dunn (disambiguation), multiple people
- Jonathon Dunn (born 1989), Vanuatuan cricketer
- Josephine Dunn (1906–1983), American actress
- Jourdan Dunn (born 1990), British model
- J. T. Dunn (born 1989), American professional wrestler
- Judith Dunn (born 1939), British psychologist
- Julian Dunn (born 2000), Canadian soccer player
- Justin Dunn (born 1995), American baseball player

=== K ===
- Kan Cheong Dunn (1925–2014), Taiwanese diplomat
- Karen Dunn (born 1975), American lawyer
- Kasey Dunn (born 1969), American football coach
- Katherine Dunn (1945–2016), American writer
- Kathleen Dunn (disambiguation), multiple people
- Katie Dunn (disambiguation), multiple people
- Katrina Dunn, Canadian actress
- K. D. Dunn (born 1963), American football player
- Keith Dunn (disambiguation), multiple people
- Ken Dunn (1912–1976), Australian politician
- Kevin Dunn (disambiguation), multiple people
- Kris Dunn (born 1994), American basketball player
- Kyle Bobby Dunn (born 1986), Canadian composer

=== L ===
- LaceDarius Dunn (born 1987), American basketball player
- Lady Dunn (disambiguation), multiple people
- Larry Dunn (born 1953), American keyboardist
- Laura Dunn (rower) (born 1987), Australian rower
- L. C. Dunn (1893–1974), American biologist
- Leith Dunn, Jamaican sociologist
- Les Dunn (1915–2009), Australian rules footballer
- Liam Dunn (1916–1976), American actor
- Lin Dunn (born 1947), American basketball coach
- Linwood G. Dunn (1904–1998), American visual artist
- Lloyd Dunn (born 1957), American musician
- Lorraine Dunn (1942–2003), Panamanian track and field athlete
- Loren C. Dunn (1930–2001), American religious official
- Louis Dunn (1908–1979), South African engineer
- Loula Friend Dunn (1896–1977), American social worker
- Lucinda Dunn (born 1973), Australian ballerina
- Lucy Dunn, American attorney
- Lydia Dunn (born 1940), Hong Kong businesswoman

=== M ===
- Mabel B. Dunn (1880–1968), American clubwoman
- Marc Dunn (born 1978), American football player
- Margaret Dunn, Irish bagpiper
- Maria Dunn (wrestler) (born 1986), Guamanian wrestler
- Maria Dunn (musician), Canadian musician
- Martin Dunn (disambiguation), multiple people
- Mark Dunn (born 1956), American author
- Martyn Dunn (born 1992), Australian wheelchair tennis player
- Marvin Dunn (born 1940) American educator, historian, and filmmaker
- Mary Dunn (disambiguation), multiple people
- Matthew Dunn (disambiguation), multiple people
- Matthias Dunn (??–1869), English engineer
- Max Dunn (1895–1963), Australian editor
- Megan Dunn (disambiguation), multiple people
- Michael Dunn (disambiguation), multiple people
- Mick Dunn (footballer) (1897–1966), Australian rules footballer
- Mick Dunn (boxer) (1864–1950), Australian boxer
- Mignon Dunn (1928–2026), American voice teacher
- Mitchell Dunn (born 1997), Australian rugby league footballer
- Moira Dunn (born 1971), American golfer
- Moncena Dunn (disambiguation), multiple people
- Mother Dunn (disambiguation), multiple people

=== N ===
- Nat Dunn, Australian singer-songwriter
- Natalie Dunn (born 1956), American roller skater
- Nate Dunn (1896–1983), American painter
- Nathan Dunn (1782–1844), American businessman
- Neal Dunn (born 1953), American politician
- Nell Dunn (born 1936), British playwright
- Nora Dunn (born 1952), American actress
- Norm Dunn (1896–1973), Australian rules footballer
- Norman Dunn (disambiguation), multiple people

=== O ===
- Oscar Dunn (1826–1871), American politician
- Olive Jean Dunn (1915–2008), American mathematical statistician
- Oliver Dunn (born 1997), American baseball player

=== P ===
- Parker F. Dunn (1890–1918), American soldier
- Pat Dunn (disambiguation), multiple people
- Patricia Dunn (actress) (1930–1990), American actress
- Patricia C. Dunn (1953–2011), American corporate executive
- Paul Dunn (disambiguation), multiple people
- Paula Dunn (born 1964), English sprinter
- Perry Lee Dunn (1941–2018), American football player
- Pete Dunn (born 1948), American baseball coach
- Peter Dunn (disambiguation), multiple people
- Pintip Dunn, American author
- Poindexter Dunn (1834–1914), American politician
- Priscilla Dunn (1943–2024), American politician

=== R ===
- Rachel Dunn (born 1982), English netball player
- Rae Dunn (born 1962/1963), American ceramist
- Ralph Dunn (1900–1968), American actor
- Ralph A. Dunn (1914–2004), American politician
- Randall Dunn, American record producer
- Randy Dunn, American academic administrator
- Randy D. Dunn (born 1982), American politician
- Ransom Dunn (1818–1900), American minister
- Ray Dunn (1910–1971), Australian sports administrator
- Reagan Dunn (born 1970/1971), American politician
- Red Dunn (1901–1957), American football player
- Reece Dunn (born 1995), British Paralympic swimmer
- Reggie Dunn (born 1989), American football player
- Richard Dunn (disambiguation), multiple people
- Richie Dunn (1957–2016), American ice hockey player
- Rick Dunn (born 1976), British rower
- Robbie Dunn (born 1960), Australian footballer
- Robbie Dunn (musician) (born 1951), Irish singer-songwriter
- Robert Dunn (disambiguation), multiple people
- Robyne Dunn (born 1963), Australian singer
- Roma Dunn (born 1943), Australian lawn bowler
- Ronald Dunn (disambiguation), multiple people
- Rose Dunn (1878–1955), American social figure
- Ross E. Dunn (born 1941), American historian
- Roy Dunn (wrestler) (1910–2000), American wrestler
- Roy Emery Dunn (1886–1985), American businessman and politician
- Ryan Dunn (1977–2011), American stunt performer
- Ryan Dunn (basketball) (born 2003), American basketball player
- Ryley Dunn (born 1985), Australian footballer

=== S ===
- Samantha Dunn (born 1964), Australian politician
- Samuel Dunn (disambiguation), multiple people
- Sarah Dunn (disambiguation), multiple people
- Scott Dunn (disambiguation), multiple people
- Seymour Dunn (1882–1959), Scottish golfer
- Sharon Dunn, Canadian writer
- Sheila Dunn (1940–2004), British actress
- Simon Dunn (1987–2023), Australian bobsledder
- Spencer Dunn, New Zealand rugby league footballer
- Spencer Dunn (snooker player) (born 1969), English snooker player
- Stephen Dunn (disambiguation), multiple people
- Steve Dunn (disambiguation), multiple people
- Susan Dunn (born 1954), American soprano
- Suzannah Dunn (born 1963), English writer

=== T ===
- Teala Dunn (born 1996), American actress and YouTuber
- Ted Dunn (1920–2016), American football coach
- Teddy Dunn (born 1980), Australian-American director
- Terrence P. Dunn, American business executive
- Terry Dunn (born 1953), American basketball coach
- Thelma Brumfield Dunn (1900–1992), American medical researcher
- Theophilus Dunn (1790–1851), English fortune teller
- Thomas Dunn (disambiguation), multiple people
- Tim Dunn (disambiguation), multiple people
- Todd Dunn (born 1970), American baseball player
- Tommy Dunn (1878–1938), Scottish footballer
- Tommy Dunn (boxer) (born 1954), English boxer
- T. R. Dunn (born 1955), American basketball player
- Trevor Dunn (born 1968), American composer
- Trieste Kelly Dunn (born 1981), American actress
- Troy Dunn (born 1967), American television personality
- Troy E. Dunn, American Air Force general

=== V ===
- Velma Dunn (1918–2007), American diver
- Vernon Dunn (1918–2002), American politician
- Victoria Dunn (born 1977), British judoka
- Vince Dunn (born 1996), Canadian ice hockey player
- Vincent Dunn (born 1935), American firefighter
- Vinny Dunn (born 1980), New Zealand professional wrestler
- Viv Dunn (1895–??), Australian rugby union footballer
- Vivian Dunn (1908–1995), British conductor

=== W ===
- Warrick Dunn (born 1975), American football player
- Wendell E. Dunn (1894–1965), American educator
- Wendell E. Dunn Jr. (1922–2007), American chemist
- William Dunn (disambiguation), multiple people
- Williamson Dunn (1781–1854), American judge
- Willie Dunn (1941–2013), Canadian singer-songwriter
- Willie Dunn (golfer) (1864–1952), English golfer
- Winfield Dunn (1927–2024), American politician
- Winifred Dunn (1898–1977), American screenwriter

=== X ===
- Xavier Dunn, Australian singer-songwriter

=== Z ===
- Zac Dunn (born 1991), Australian boxer

== Fictional characters ==
- Dan Dunn, titular secret agent from the 1930s series
- Danny Dunn, a character in the many book series

== See also ==
- Donne (disambiguation), a disambiguation page for Donne
- Dunne (surname), people with the surname "Dunne"
- General Dunn (disambiguation), a disambiguation page for Generals surnamed "Dunn"
- Governor Dunn (disambiguation), a disambiguation page for Governors surnamed "Dunn"
- Justice Dunn (disambiguation), a disambiguation page for Justices surnamed "Dunn"
- Senator Dunn (disambiguation), a disambiguation page for Senators surnamed "Dunn"
