= Mick Dunn =

Mick Dunn may refer to:

- Mick Dunn (footballer)
- Mick Dunn (boxer)

== See also ==
- Mick Dunne, Irish sports journalist
