= Gorreana =

Portuguese tea company in the Azores

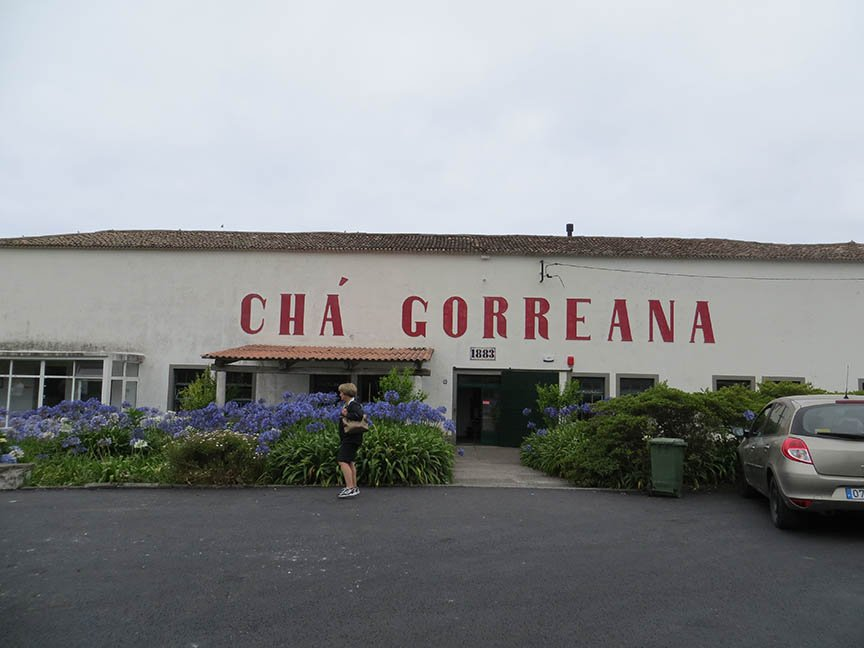
Main plant of Chá Gorreana Tea Plantation in São Miguel, Azores, Portugal

Gorreana is a Portuguese company headquartered in São Miguel Island, Azores. It is the oldest surviving tea plantation in Europe and one of only two still operating in the Azores.

== History ==
Although the Azores were initially famed for growing oranges, blight devastated the orange fields to the point of near-complete destruction by 1864. The farmer José do Canto was the first to import tea, in 1860, as a potential replacement crop. In 1878, the Society for the Promotion of São Miguel Agriculture arranged for two Chinese tea specialists from Macau, Lau-a-Pan and his interpreter Lau-a-Teng, to teach São Miguel the fundamentals of the industry. Tea was especially cultivated on the northern slopes of the island. Tea harvesting took place between April and September, mostly employing women and children. Although there were previously multiple tea companies on the island, global economic instability during the world wars, immigration from the Azores, and competition with tea from Mozambique led to a decline in the tea industry, with Gorreana being the sole survivor by the 1980s.

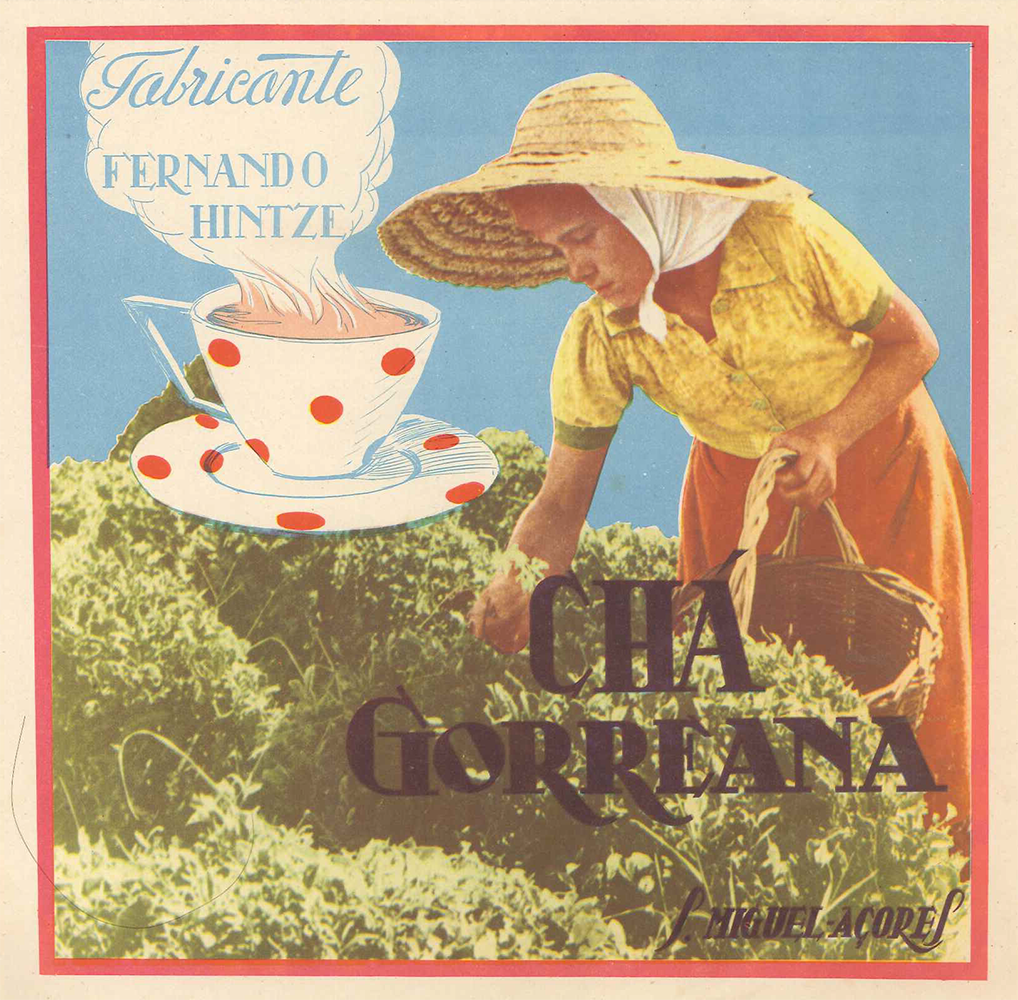
Merchandising for Gorreana tea, 1950s

The tea plantation that would become Gorreana was founded in 1883 by Ermelinda Gago da Camara, who was married to José Honorato Gago da Camara. Their granddaughter, Angelina Gago da Camara Hintze, and her husband, Jaime Hintze, took over the plantation upon Ermelinda's death in 1913. They modernized the plantation and rebranded it as Gorreana in 1926. Their son Fernando Gago da Camara Hintze inherited Gorreana in 1945, and Fernando's wife, Berta Maria Ferreira de Lima Meirelles, managed the property after his death in 1961. Fernando's daughter, Margarida Meirelles Gago da Camara Hintze, and her husband, Hermano Mota, began managing Gorreana in the 1990s. After Hermano's death in 2013, their children began managing Gorreana.

Porto Formoso is the other tea factory in São Miguel, although unlike Gorreana it has not been in continuous operation, having closed in the 1980s and reopened in 2001.

== Production ==
In the 1920s, Gorreana packaged its tea with a written endorsement from Rear Admiral Herbert O. Dunn, who commanded the nearby U.S. naval base.

As of 2021, Gorreana was maintaining its operations much as it had in earlier times, producing between 30 and 40 tons of tea per year. Gorreana produces varieties of both black tea (Moinha, Broken Leaf, Pekoe, Orange Pekoe, Ponta Branca, Oolong) and green tea (Hysson, Encosta de Bruma, Pérola). The relatively dry climate and isolation from parasites has allowed Gorreana tea to be produced without the use of pesticides.
