= Patrick Dunne =

Patrick Dunne may refer to:

- Patrick Dunne (priest) (1818–1900), Roman Catholic priest in Australia
- Pat Dunne (American football) (active 1920–1921), American football player
- Pat Dunne (1943–2015), Irish football goalkeeper
- Paddy Dunne (Gaelic footballer) (1929–2013), Irish Gaelic football player
- Paddy Dunne (politician) (1928–2006), Irish Labour Party politician, senator and Lord Mayor of Dublin
- Pecker Dunne (Patrick Dunne, 1933–2012), Irish singer and musician
- Patrick Dun (1642–1714), Irish physician and namesake of Sir Patrick Dun's Hospital
- Patrick Dun (educator) (1581–1652), Scottish scholar and principal of Marischal College

== See also ==
- Pat Dunn (disambiguation)
- Patrick Dunn (disambiguation)
