= James Dunn =

James, Jim or Jimmy Dunn may refer to:

== Politicians ==
- James Dunn (Australian politician) (1887–1945), Australian Senator
- James Dunn (Victorian politician) (1886–1975), member of the Victorian Parliament
- James Clement Dunn (1890–1979), U.S. ambassador
- James Dunn (British politician) (1926–1985), MP for Liverpool, Kirkdale
- James B. Dunn (1927–2016), American politician
- Jim Dunn (Washington politician) (born 1942), elected to the Washington State House, 2006
- James Whitney Dunn (born 1943), U.S. Representative from the state of Michigan

== Sportspeople ==
- Jim Dunn (baseball owner) (1865–1922), owner of the Cleveland Indians baseball team
- Jimmy Dunn (soccer) (1897–1987), American soccer player
- Jimmy Dunn (sports executive) (1898–1979), Canadian multi-sport executive and Hockey Hall of Fame inductee
- Jimmy Dunn (footballer, born 1900) (1900–1963), Scottish international footballer (Hibernian, Everton)
- James W. Dunn (1911–1983), American football coach
- Jimmy Dunn (footballer, born 1922) (1922–2005), Scottish footballer (Leeds United)
- Jimmy Dunn (footballer, born 1923) (1923–2014), Scottish footballer (Wolves, Derby County)
- Jim Dunn (pitcher) (1931–1999), American baseball pitcher
- James Dunn (rugby league) (born 1933), English rugby league footballer
- James Dunn (soccer) (born 1971), American soccer defender
- James Dunn (sledge hockey) (born 2000), Canadian sledge hockey player

== Others ==
- J. C. Dunn or James Churchill Dunn (1871–1955), British army medical officer and author
- James Francis Dunn (1874–1921), American architect
- Sir James Hamet Dunn (1874–1956), 1st Baronet, Canadian financier and industrialist
- James Philip Dunn (1884–1936), American composer and organist
- James Dunn (actor) (1901–1967), actor who performed in Bad Girl and A Tree Grows In Brooklyn
- James Dunn (diplomat) (1928–2020), Australian diplomat
- James Dunn (theologian) (1939–2020), British Protestant New Testament scholar
- James Nicol Dunn (1856–1919), Scottish journalist and newspaper editor
- Jimmy Dunn (comedian), American stand-up comedian and actor
- Jim Dunn (writer), television writer and producer
- James Dunn, member of the R&B group The Stylistics

== See also ==
- Jamie Dunn (1950–2026), Australian comedian
- James Dunne (disambiguation)
