= Harvey Dunn (disambiguation) =

Harvey Dunn (1884–1952) was an American artist.

Harvey Dunn may also refer to:

- Harvey B. Dunn (1894–1968), American television and film actor
- Harvey Dunn Sr. (1899–1961), Australian rules footballer
- Harvey Dunn Jr. (1931–2013), Australian rules footballer
