= Joe Dunne (disambiguation) =

Joe Dunne (born 1973) is an Irish football manager and former footballer.

Joe Dunne may also refer to:

- Joe Dunne (artist) (born 1957), Irish artist
- Joe Dunne (British Army soldier) (1914–2014), sergeant in the Irish Guards
- Joe E. Dunne (1881–1963), American politician from Oregon
- Joe Dunne (footballer, born 2001), English footballer
- Joe Dunne (stuntman) (1935–2022), British actor and stuntman

== See also ==
- Joe Dunn (disambiguation)
