= George Taylor (footballer, born 1920) =

English footballer

Personal information
- Full name: George Edward Taylor
- Date of birth: 21 March 1920
- Place of birth: Wigan, Lancashire, England
- Date of death: October 1983 (aged 63)
- Place of death: Newham, London, England
- Position: Goalkeeper

Senior career*
Years	Team	Apps	(Gls)
–1938	Gainsborough Trinity		
1938–1956	West Ham United	115	(0)
1956–?	Sittingbourne		
- * Club domestic league appearances and goals

George Edward Taylor (21 March 1920 – October 1983) was an English footballer who played as a goalkeeper in the Football League for West Ham United.

Born in Wigan, Taylor began his career at Gainsborough Trinity before moving to West Ham United in December 1938. After the outbreak of World War II, Taylor made 10 appearances in the League South.

When hostilities ended, Taylor made his competitive debut for West Ham on 9 September 1946, along with inside-forward Richard Dunn, in a 3–2 defeat at Fulham.

Taylor played 231 games for the reserve team in the Football Combination and his League appearances were limited by the presence of Ernie Gregory. He played 38 games in 1954–55, when Gregory missed the season through injury.

He made a total of 115 appearances for West Ham in the Second Division before moving to Southern League club Sittingbourne.
