= Rae Dunn (brand) =

Retail home wares brand

- Product type: Ceramics, pottery, home wares
- Current owner: Rae Dunn
- Country: San Francisco, California, United States
- Introduced: 1995; 31 years ago
- Markets: United States, Canada, Australia
- Website: www.raedunn.com

Rae Dunn is a retail home wares brand founded by ceramist Rae Dunn in 1995. Its product line features a range of products including pillows, frames, and pet products, among other items, and is best known for its ceramic mugs and containers. All of the brand's items are also noted for featuring simple phrases emblazoned on them.

These products are exclusively found in retail stores operated by TJX Companies (such as T.J. Maxx, Marshalls, and HomeGoods).

== History and products ==
After deciding to pursue ceramic art as a full-time career, she founded her eponymous brand of ceramic wares in 1995. She later secured a licensing deal with Magenta, Inc. and since 2003, the ceramics manufacturer has mass-produced her line of wares. The brand gained increased popularity in the 2010s "as part of the now hegemonic HGTV–'modern farmhouse'–Chip and Joanna Gaines domestic aesthetic." In addition to the "farmhouse chic" trend, social media platforms as Instagram and Facebook also helped propel the brand's popularity. In March 2017, TJX Companies employed a companywide policy that prohibited placing Rae Dunn items on hold due to the popularity of the brand at its stores. In August 2018, Dunn released her first home line, featuring items such as pillows and frames. This line was sold at Kirkland's. By 2022, Rae Dunn products were exclusively sold at TJX Companies stores.

The brand's wares are known for featuring simple designs and one- or two-word phrases, like "yum" or "family" emblazoned on them. These phrases are also labeled with the brand's signature font, a "delicate, unadorned, hand-crafted" typeface. White or cream-colored ceramic mugs and containers have been cited by media outlets as among the brand's most popular. Holiday-themed and seasonal items are distributed by the brand, featuring phrases like "merry" or "cheer". Halloween items are widely considered the "most beloved" of the holiday lines. Rae Dunn has also partnered with Disney on specific lines.

Due to Dunn's success with selling ceramic decor under her name, her brand expanded to included merchandise such as toasters, eyeglasses, jewellery, and pet products.

== Reception and popularity ==
Writing for The Cut about Rae Dunn's emergence as a popular brand, Kathryn Jezer-Morton postulated that the "'handwritten' font on a slightly irregular neutral surface did important visual work at a time when the speculative real-estate market and social media were converging in an economic tsunami across the United States." Francky Knapp, writing for Vice wrote that "price and retail accessibility is also key to Rae Dunn's cult success. Many of the brand's items sell for under $20, offering easy entry points into the thrilling world of competitive upselling."

The brand has often been cited as being popular among women, particularly suburban women, "wine moms", and those in the millennial cohort. In 2018, The Houston Chronicle wrote "since it's only been a year or so since popularity began peaking, there's no proper name for a Rae Dunn collector." Later, Rae Dunn enthusiasts were dubbed by themselves and media outlets alike as "Rae Dunn Hunters", "Rae Dunnies", "Rae Dunners", and "Rae Dunn Women" among other nicknames.

Products from the brand have been cited to be considerably coveted, with shoppers of the brand lining up early prior to a store's opening "to shop the latest collections." While they have been described as "avid followers", shoppers of the brand have also been described as "feral" and "rabid". The brand's following has also been described as "cult-like". TJX Companies employees have detailed instances of "crowds of customers swarming stores and shoppers getting into physical fights over mugs, jars, and spoons." In 2021, videos of Rae Dunners avidly shopping for the brand's products went viral on TikTok.

Jezer-Morton also wrote that "since about 2016, a voraciously focused secondary market of resellers, traders, and collectors has grown around the brand." Rae Dunners often join Facebook groups dedicated to the brand's products and resell these products at higher prices. For these shoppers, there is a heightened appeal for the brand's seasonal collections and particularly rare items, such as a "ceramic pig-shaped canister with the word 'oink' on its side. Due to this reselling culture, Rae Dunn shoppers have been likened to contemporary sneakerheads or hypebeasts, as well as Beanie Baby collectors of the late 1990s. Jezer-Morton opined that the comparison is "reductive and maybe … a touch misogynistic." Knapp wrote that "Therein lies the brand's success within Live-Laugh-Love/wine-mom culture: the notion of doing the most, with less. It gives buyers a price-accessible, gold star on the forehead with an influx of one-word affirmations and reminders for self-care, or valuing family (although the latter of which lives in a very his-and-hers, hetero-traditional Nuclear Fam zone)."

Dunn herself has acknowledged the following behind her brand, referring to it as a "weird phenomenon" that she never intended to cause. She also expressed being sad and upset about resellers, stating "I wish I could sell more of my handmade stuff. But when I do it, I know that people are buying it and reselling it for hundreds of dollars more," adding "I feel like I'm just being used."
