= James Dunne =

Jim, Jimmy or James Dunne may refer to:

== Sportsmen ==
- Jimmy Dunne (footballer, born 1905) (1905–1949), Irish forward
- Jimmy Dunne (footballer, born 1935) (1935–1983/4), Irish inside forward, son of above
- James Dunne (boxer) (1941–2002), English lightweight Olympian
- Jimmy Dunne (footballer, born 1947), Irish centre back and midfielder
- James Dunne (footballer, born 1989), English midfielder with Croydon Athletic
- Jimmy Dunne (footballer, born 1997), Irish defender for Queens Park Rangers

== Others ==
- James Dunne (Medal of Honor) (1840–1915), American Union Army corporal at Battle of Vicksburg
- James E. Dunne (1882–1942), American mayor of Providence 1927–1939
- Jimmy Dunne (politician) (1921–1972), Irish Labour Party senator and trade unionist
- Jim Dunne (1931–2019), American automotive spy photographer and journalist
- Jimmy Dunne (songwriter), American composer and producer since 1990s

== See also ==
- James Dunn (disambiguation)
