= Stephen Dunn (disambiguation) =

Stephen Dunn (1939–2021) was an American poet and educator.

Stephen or Steven Dunn may also refer to:

- Stephen Dunn (sound engineer) (1894–1980), American sound engineer
- Stephen Porter Dunn (1928–1999), American anthropologist
- Stephen Troyte Dunn (1868–1938), British botanist
- Stephen Dunn (director) (born 1989), Canadian film director
- Steve Doll also known as Steven Dunn (1960–2009), American professional wrestler

== See also ==
- Stephen Dunne (disambiguation)
- Steve Dunn (disambiguation)
- Dunn (surname)
