= Jerry Dunn =

Jerry Dunn may refer to:

- Jerry Dunn (basketball) (born 1953), American basketball coach
- Jerry Dunn (runner) (born 1946), American athlete
