= Senator Dunn =

Senator Dunn may refer to:

- Aubrey Dunn Sr. (1928–2012), New Mexico State Senate
- Cathy Dunn (born 1949), North Carolina State Senate
- Charles J. Dunn (1799–1872), Wisconsin State Senate
- David Dunn (Maine politician) (1811–1894), Maine State Senate
- George Grundy Dunn (1812–1857), Indiana State Senate
- Howard H. Dunn (1867–1942), Minnesota State Senate
- James B. Dunn (1927–2016), South Dakota State Senate
- Joe Dunn (California politician) (born 1958), California State Senate
- Lester Dunn (1890–1971), Nebraska State Senate
- Martin J. Dunn (1956–2020), Massachusetts State Senate
- Priscilla Dunn (1943–2024), Alabama State Senate
- Ralph A. Dunn (1914–2004), Illinois State Senate
- Richard Dunn (politician) (1905–1988), Maine State Senate
- Robert C. Dunn (1855–1918), Minnesota State Senate
- Robert G. Dunn (1923–2017), Minnesota State Senate
- Tim Dunn (politician) (born 1966), Arizona State Senate
- Thomas A. Dunn (born 1942), Illinois State Senate
- Thomas B. Dunn (1853–1924), New York State Senate
- Thomas G. Dunn (1921–1998), New Jersey State Senate

== See also ==
- Senator Dunne (disambiguation)
