= Dan Dunn (disambiguation) =

Dan Dunn was the first fictional character to appear in an American comic book.

Dan Dunn may also refer to:

- Dan Dunn (painter) (born 1957), American improvisational artist
- Dan Dunn (writer) (born 1968), American comedy writer

== See also ==
- Danny Dunn
