= George Dunn =

George Dunn may refer to:

- George Hedford Dunn (1794–1854), U.S. representative from Indiana
- George Grundy Dunn (1812–1857), U.S. representative from Indiana
- George Dunn (actor) (1914–1982), American actor
- George Dunn (publisher), American music publisher and lithographer
- George Dunn (Australian politician) (1859–1925), member of the South Australian House of Assembly
- George Dunn (RAF officer) (1922–2026), British air force officer
- George E. Dunn (1927–2020), member of the South Dakota House of Representatives
- George W. Dunn (1840–1914), American politician from New York

== See also ==
- George Dunne (1913–2006), politician from Illinois
