= Christopher Dunn =

Christopher or Chris Dunn may refer to:

- Christopher Dunn (computer programmer) (born c. 1956), British writer and computer enthusiast
- Christopher Dunn (author), writer on pyramidology
- Christopher Dunn (American football) (born 1999)
- Chris Dunn (athlete) (born 1951), American athlete
- Chris Dunn (footballer) (born 1987), English football goalkeeper
- Christopher Dunn (exonerated prisoner) (born 1971), American wrongfully convicted of murder

== See also ==
- Kris Dunn (born 1994), American basketball player
