= Henry Dunn =

Henry Dunn may refer to:

- Henry Donn (or Dunn; died 1586), English conspirator involved in the Babington Plot
- Henry Dunn (educationalist) (1801–1878), English educationalist and author
- Henry Treffry Dunn (1838–1899), English painter, Dante Gabriel Rossetti's assistant
- Henry Dunn (Harper's Island), a character in the TV series Harper's Island

== See also ==
- Henry Dunne (1872–1959), Australian rules footballer
- Harry Dunn (disambiguation)
