= Herbert Dunn =

Herbert Dunn may refer to:

- Herbert O. Dunn (1857–1939), admiral in the United States Navy
- Herbert Dunn (politician) (1883–1952), Australian politician
- Herbert Henry Dunn, English architect and surveyor
