= Arthur Dunn (disambiguation) =

Arthur Dunn may refer to:

- Arthur Dunn (1860–1902), English footballer and founder of Ludgrove School
- Arthur William Dunn (1868–1927), American educator

== See also ==
- Arthur Dunn Airpark, an airport in Brevard County, Florida
