= Steve Dunn =

Steve Dunn may refer to:

- Steve Dunn (1990s first baseman) (born 1970), Major League Baseball player
- Steve Dunn (1880s first baseman) (1858–1933), Major League Baseball player
- Steve Dunn (referee) (born 1957), English football referee
- Steve Dunn (civil servant), Director General of the Pacific Islands Forum Fisheries Agency, 2004–2006
- Stephen Dunne (actor) (1918–1977), American actor sometimes credited as Steve Dunn

== See also ==
- Steven Dunn or Steve Doll (1960–2009), American professional wrestler
- Stephen Dunn (disambiguation)
- Stephen Dunne (disambiguation)

(1960-present Cricket professional, teacher. Warwickshire CCC Club & Ground 1979-82. Master ic Cricket Stockport Grammar School 1982-88. Lancashire CCC U19 Coach 1984-88. Bradford Grammar School Master ic Cricket 1988-91, leeds Grammar School / Grammar School at Leeds 2002-2018 Master ic Cricket. Retired.
