= Martin Dunne =

Martin Dunne may refer to:

- Martin Dunne (footballer, born 1886) (1886–1955), played for Southampton
- Martin Dunne (Gaelic footballer) (born 1989), Cavan inter-county player
- Martin Dunne (Lord Lieutenant) (born 1938), British public servant

== See also ==
- Martin Dunn (disambiguation)
