= Edward Dunne =

Edward Dunne may refer to:

- Edward Fitzsimmons Dunne, Mayor of Chicago and Governor of Illinois
- Edward Joseph Dunne, Bishop of Dallas
- Edward Marten Dunne, British army officer and MP

== See also ==
- Edward Dunn (disambiguation)
