= Martin Dunn =

Martin Dunn may refer to:

- Martin Dunn (cricketer) (1883–1942), Australian cricketer
- Martin Dunn (journalist) (born 1955), British journalist
- Martin J. Dunn (1956–2020), American lawyer and politician

== See also ==
- Martin Dunne (disambiguation)
