= Senator Dunne =

Senator Dunne may refer to:

- Joe E. Dunne (1881–1963), Oregon State Senate
- John R. Dunne (born 1930), New York State Senate
- Matt Dunne (born 1969), Vermont State Senate

== See also ==
- Senator Dunn (disambiguation)
