= Senator Burke =

Senator Burke may refer to:

== Members of the United States Senate ==
- Edward R. Burke (1880–1968), U.S. Senator from Nebraska from 1935 to 1941
- Thomas A. Burke (1898–1971), U.S. Senator from Ohio from 1953 to 1954

== United States state senate members ==
- Brian Burke (American politician) (born 1958), Wisconsin
- David Burke (politician) (born 1967), Ohio State Senate
- Dean Burke (born 1957), Georgia State Senate
- John P. Burke (born 1954), Massachusetts State Senate
- John Burke (North Dakota politician) (1859–1937), North Dakota State Senate
- Michael E. Burke (1863–1918), Wisconsin State Senate
- Raymond H. Burke (1881–1954), Ohio State Senate
- Timothy Burke (politician) (1866–1926), Wisconsin State Senate
- William J. Burke (1862–1925), Pennsylvania State Senate
