= Katie Dunn =

Katie or Katy Dunn(e) may refer to:

- Katie Dunn (boxer) in 2006 Women's World Amateur Boxing Championships
- Katie Dunn, character played by Jennifer Dundas
- Katie Dunn, character in Seconds Apart
- Katie Marie Dunn, participant in the 1999 Kingwood robbery incidents
- Katy Dunne (born 1995), British tennis player

== See also ==
- Catherine Dunn (disambiguation)
- Kathleen Dunn (disambiguation)
