= Francis Dunn =

Francis Dunn may refer to:

- Francis Dunn (American football) (1891–1975), American football player and coach
- Francis G. Dunn (fl. 1937–1985), Justice of the South Dakota Supreme Court
- Francis J. Dunn (fl. 1841), Wisconsin politician
- Francis John Dunn (1922–1989), bishop in the Catholic Church in the United States
