= Mother Dunn =

Mother Dunn may refer to:

- Francis Dunn (American football) (1891–1975), American football player for the Canton Bulldogs and head football coach of Dickinson College
- William Thomas Dunn (1881–1962), Penn State All-American football player and physician
