= Paul Dunne (disambiguation) =

Paul Dunne is an Irish golfer.

Paul Dunne may also refer to:

- Paul Dunne, who played for The Rock GAA
- Paul Dunne, character played by Keith Duffy

== See also ==
- Paul Dunn (disambiguation)
