= Christopher Dunn (exonerated prisoner) =

American wrongfully convicted of murder

- Christopher Dunn in 2026
- Born: 1971 (age 54–55)

Christopher Dunn (born 1971) is an African American man who was wrongfully convicted of murder in 1991 and exonerated in 2024.

== Early life ==
Dunn is the son of Martha Dunn and William Douglas Baker. After living in public housing, the family moved to a single family home in the Wells-Goodfellow neighborhood of St. Louis.

== Murder conviction ==
On May 19, 1990, around midnight, a 15-year-old boy named Recco Rogers was fatally shot in Dunn's neighborhood of Wells-Goodfellow, St. Louis. Two teenagers in the vicinity of the shooting, Michael Davis and DeMorris Stepp, identified Dunn as the shooter when interviewed by police. Dunn was charged with first-degree murder, assault, and weapons offenses.

Dunn was convicted of first-degree murder and sentenced to life in prison without parole in 1991.

== Exoneration ==
The two teenagers who had identified Dunn as the shooter later recanted their testimony. This led the St. Louis Circuit Attorney to file a motion to vacate the conviction in May 2023. This motion was filed under Section 547.031, a Missouri statute that allows prosecutors, when they have evidence that a person may be innocent or may have been erroneously convicted, to seek to vacate a conviction. This was important for this case, as Dunn had exhausted every other way to appeal.

Dunn was freed on July 30, 2024, after more than 30 years in prison. (Note: This source indicates Dunn was imprisoned for 33 years, but other sources make clear he was imprisoned for 34 years, from 1990 to 2024.)

== See also ==
- Innocence Project
