= Andrew Dunn =

Andrew Dunn may refer to:

- Andrew Dunn (actor) (born 1957), English actor
- Andrew Dunn (businessman) (1854–1934), Australian newspaper proprietor and Member of the Queensland Legislative Council
- Andrew Dunn (cinematographer), British cinematographer
- Andrew Dunn (horticulturalist) (born 1917), 2003 Victoria Medal of Honour winner
- Andrew Hunter Dunn (1839–1914), bishop of Quebec
- Andy Dunn (born 1979), American entrepreneur

== See also ==
- Andrew Dunne (born 1979), Irish rugby union player
- Andrew Dunne (priest) (died 1823), Irish priest
