= George Dunn (publisher) =

American music publisher and lithographer

George Dunn was an American music publisher and lithographer. He entered the music publishing business in 1863, during the American Civil War and rapidly rode to prominence. His firm was George Dunn & Company, and during the War Dunn published thirty-two works on his own and twenty-four with partner Julian A. Selby.

Some of the company's more popular works include "The Southern Soldier Boy", "God, Save the Southern Land", "Ardent Recruit" and "A Gallant Boy".
