= Richard Dunn =

Richard Dunn may refer to:

- Richard Dunn (politician) (1905–1988), American politician from Maine
- Dick Dunn (boxer) (1908–2001), New Zealand boxing coach
- Richard Dunn (footballer) (1919–1985), English footballer
- Dick Dunn (rugby league) (1920–2006), Australian rugby league footballer
- Richard B. Dunn (1927–2005), American solar physicist and astronomer
- Richard Slator Dunn (1928–2022), American historian
- Richard Dunn (actor) (1936–2010), American actor, regular cast member of Tim and Eric Awesome Show, Great Job!
- Richard Dunn (television executive) (1943–1998), English television executive and Thames Television CEO from 1985 to 1995
- Richard Dunn (boxer) (born 1945), English boxer
- Richie Dunn (1957–2016), American ice hockey player
- Dick Dunn (sports promoter), American sports promoter

== See also ==
- Richard Dunne (born 1979), Irish footballer
