= Catherine Dunn =

Catherine Dunn(e), Katherine Dunn(e), or variants, may refer to:

== People ==
=== Dunn ===
- Catherine Dunn (school administrator), president of Clarke College in Dubuque, Iowa, U.S., 1984–2006
- Catherine Dunn, featured on Tim McGraw's 2015 single "Diamond Rings and Old Barstools"
- Cathy Dunn (born 1949), American politician
- Katherine Dunn (1945–2016), American writer
- Katie Dunn (boxer) in 2005 and 2006 Women's World Amateur Boxing Championships
- Katie Marie Dunn, a perpetrator of the 1999 Kingwood robbery incidents
- Katy Dunne (born 1995), British tennis player
- Catherine Dunn, later Smith (died 1944), wife of Al Smith and First Lady of New York

=== Dunne ===
- Catherine Dunne (writer) (born 1954), Irish writer
- Catherine Dunne (bombing victim), nun fatally injured by the 1990 Armagh City roadside bomb

== Fictional characters ==
- Katie Dunn, in ABC Afterschool Special, played by Jennifer Dundas
- Katie Dunn, in Seconds Apart

== See also ==
- Kathleen Dunn (disambiguation)
- Katrina Dunn, Canadian actress
