= Norm Dunn =

Australian rules footballer

Personal information
- Full name: Norman Dunn
- Born: 21 January 1896; Buangor, Victoria
- Died: 5 July 1973 (aged 77); Ashwood, Victoria
- Height: 177 cm (5 ft 10 in)
- Position: Centre Half Forward

Playing career^{1}
Years	Club	Games (Goals)
1918–1919	Essendon	14 (3)
- ^{1} Playing statistics correct to the end of 1919.

Norm Dunn (21 January 1896 – 5 July 1973) was an Australian rules footballer for Essendon in the Victorian Football League (VFL).

Dunn began his VFL career for Essendon in 1918. He played his final VFL match in 1919 having played 14 matches.
