= Stephen Dunne =

Stephen Dunne or Steve Dunne may refer to:

- Stephen Dunne (actor) (1918–1977), American actor, radio personality, and disc jockey; sometimes credited as Steve Dunne
- Stephen Dunne (politician) (born 1988/89), Northern Irish politician
- Steve Dunne (cricket umpire) (born 1943), New Zealand cricket umpire

== See also ==
- Stephen Dunn (disambiguation)
