= Joe Dunne (stuntman) =

British actor and stuntman

- Dunne in The Avengers, 1968
- Born: Joseph Martin Dunne; 27 October 1935; Liverpool, England
- Died: 14 January 2022 (aged 86)
- Occupations: Actor, stuntman
- Spouse: Ann Kempster (died. 2010)

Joseph Martin Dunne (27 October 1935 – 14 January 2022) was a British actor and stuntman.

== Early life and career ==
Dunne was born in Liverpool, and was raised in Brixton. His mother performed with the Madam Clarke's Twelve Parisian Maids. He attended Santley School and the Bembridge Boarding School on the Isle of Wright. He moved to London, and played football, playing as a goalkeeper for Hendon F.C. in the 1950s. He began his screen career in 1960, playing an uncredited role of a soldier in the film The League of Gentlemen. In 1961, he performed stunts in the The Guns of Navarone.

Later in his career, in 1965, Dunne stunt doubled for Ringo Starr in the 1965 film Help!. He also stunt doubled for Peter Sellers in the films The Pink Panther Strikes Again and Revenge of the Pink Panther. He performed stunts in numerous films such as You Only Live Twice, Police Academy (and its sequel Police Academy 2: Their First Assignment), A Clockwork Orange, The Man with Two Brains, Three Fugitives, The Usual Suspects, Switch, A Gnome Named Gnorm, The Man Who Loved Women and Kelly's Heroes.

== Personal life and death ==
Dunne was married to Ann Kempster. Their marriage lasted until her death in 2010.

Dunne died on 14 January 2022, at the age of 86.
