= Vernon Dunn =

American politician

Member of the Oklahoma House of Representatives from the 51st district
- In office 1965–1983
- Preceded by: District established
- Succeeded by: Bill Smith

Personal details
- Born: March 29, 1918 Caddo, Oklahoma, U.S.
- Died: April 2, 2002 (aged 84)
- Political party: Democratic
- Spouse: Helen Dunn
- Children: 3

Vernon Dunn (March 29, 1918 – April 2, 2002) was an American politician. He served as a Democratic member for the 51st district of the Oklahoma House of Representatives.

== Life and career ==
Dunn was born in Caddo, Oklahoma, the son of Nancy and Ed Dunn. He was a commissioner in Stephens County, Oklahoma.

In 1965, Dunn was elected to the 51st district of the Oklahoma House of Representatives. He served until 1983, when he was succeeded by Bill Smith.

Dunn died in April 2002 from complications of pneumonia, at the age of 84.
