= Norman Dunn =

Norman Dunn may refer to:

- Norman Alexander Dunn (born 1967), Jamaican politician
- Norman Dunn (EastEnders character)
