= Wells/Goodfellow, St. Louis =

Neighborhood of St. Louis in Missouri, US

Coordinates: 38.6769°N 90.2707°W

Wells/Goodfellow
- Neighborhood of St. Louis
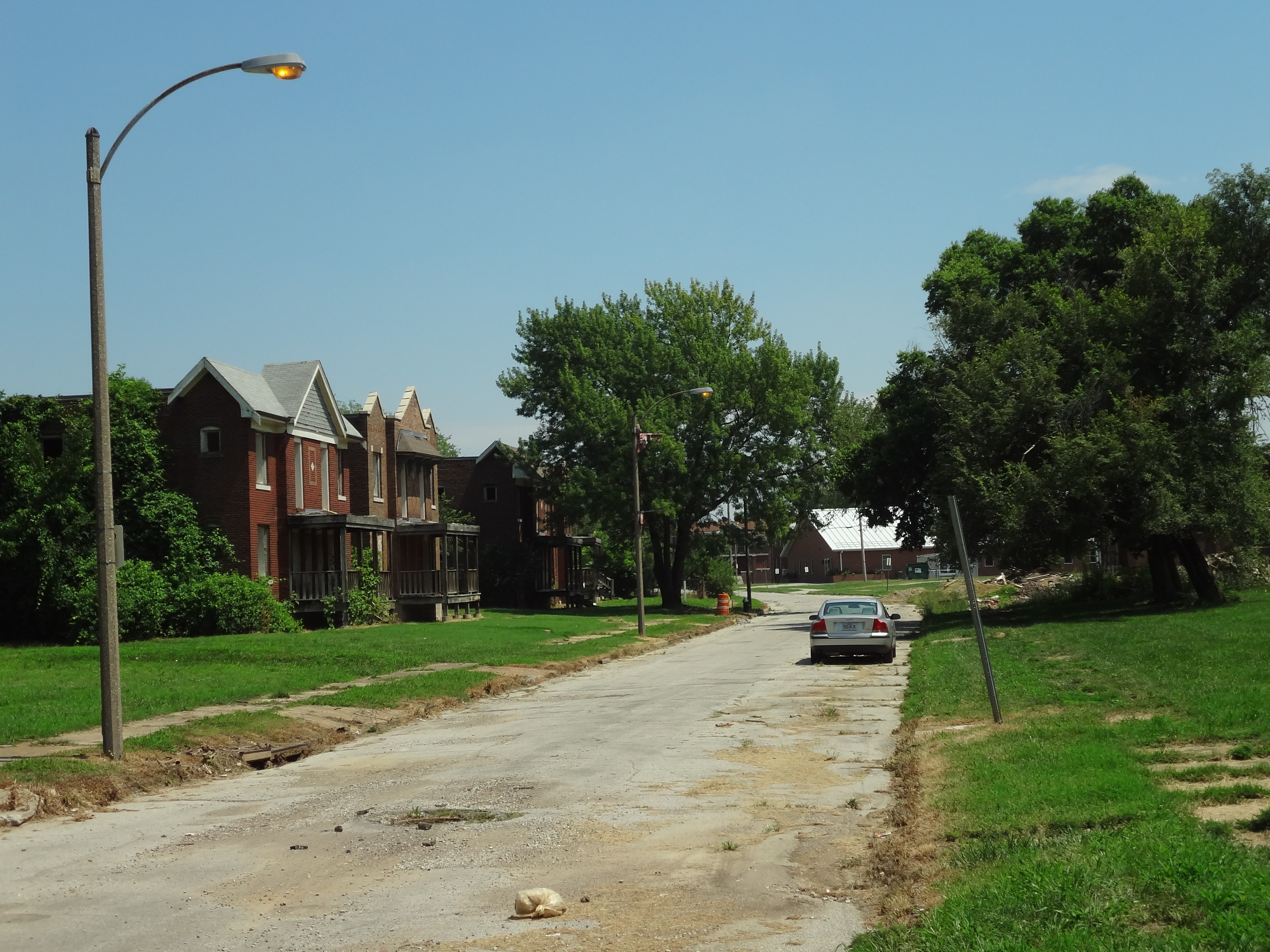
- The last buildings on the Horseshoe (now demolished), July 2011

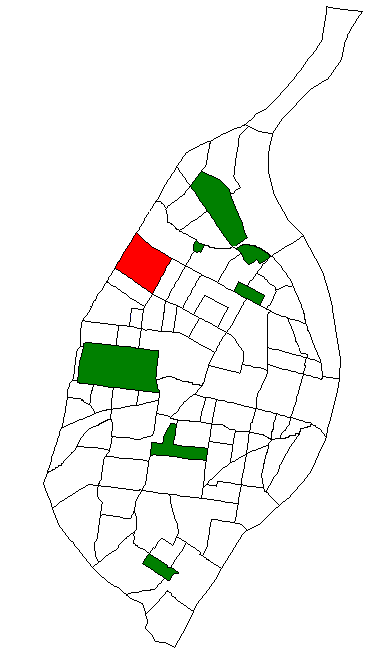
- Location (red) of Wells/Goodfellow within St. Louis
- Country: United States
- State: Missouri
- City: St. Louis
- Wards: 12, 13

Government
  - Aldermen: Sharon Tyus, Pam Boyd

Area
  - Total: 1.23 sq mi (3.2 km^{2})

Population (2020)
  - Total: 4,473
  - Density: 3,640/sq mi (1,400/km^{2})
- ZIP code(s): Parts of 63112, 63120
- Area code(s): 314
- Website: stlouis-mo.gov

Wells/Goodfellow is a neighborhood of St. Louis, Missouri. The borders of the neighborhood are defined by the St. Louis city limits on the north-western edge, Dr. Martin Luther King Drive to the south-west, Natural Bridge Avenue to the north-east, and Union Boulevard to the south-east.

== Education ==
- Gundlach Elementary School
- Pierre Laclede Elementary School
- Stowe Middle School
- Langston Middle School

== History ==
Part of the area dates to before the Civil War, and at one time it was the location of the popular amusement center Suburban Garden at Kennerly and Hodiamont, but its greatest growth came in the 1920s and 1930s with a mixture of single family homes, duplexes, four-family flats and apartment buildings. Before World War II the area was considered a particularly attractive community in which to live and rear a family. For example, on Roosevelt Place large grassy pastures extended west from the four-family flat at 5865-67 to the western city limits and north to the Wabash railroad tracks. On the west ran the City Limits streetcar line on an in-the-woods embankment a block east of Kienlen Avenue; on the north ran the Wabash corridor, with heavy rail traffic including the Wabash Cannonball at 10:08 each morning and the Bluebird at 10:13. Leschen Rope and Wire factory on Hamilton between Kennerly and Roosevelt hummed with activity day and night and had its own railroad spur leading from the Wabash tracks. The four-family flat at 5865-67 Roosevelt turned out a Missouri lieutenant governor, a highly awarded nurse, a successful sculptor, and a celebrated teacher. Next to the building the occupant of one flat kept horses in a barn and blackberry patches stretched westward. A well-known case involving alien abductions—or the illusion of them—also took place in this building over an extended time beginning in the 1940s before there were any flying saucer images or knowledge in the culture and it affected children in multiple families in the building. The case is known to experts as high as the university level; the children involved only learned of each other's experiences, and the effects on their subsequent lives, 40 years after the fact. Laclede School on Kennerly Avenue at Goodfellow was, through the 1940s and early '50s, considered a choice grade school in the city for both students and teachers. The principal Fred S. Milam was well known for hiring the best teachers and then letting them teach, valuing autonomy and expertise. Likewise, the Wellston library was one of the most popular in the city; the children came from middle-class or lower-middle-class homes without many extras and kept the small library jammed on Saturdays as they selected which books they would next read. The area mixed a heavy Catholic population and a heavy Jewish population with other religions with harmony. When the exodus to the suburbs in the late 1950s moved swiftly the neighborhoods underwent a drastic change and today much of the area's structures are long gone. Laclede School notably held on to its reputation through hard years for the neighborhood and the building now boasts a large gym in what had been the girls' playground.

== Demographics ==
Historical population
Census	Pop.	Note	%±
1990	11,738		—
2000	8,193		−30.2%
2010	5,895		−28.0%
2020	4,473		−24.1%

In 2020 Wells/Goodfellow's racial makeup was 94.7% Black, 1.5% White, 0.1% Native American, 0.1% Asian, 2.9% Two or More Races, and 0.8% Some Other Race. 1.0% of the people were of Hispanic or Latino origin.
