= Seymour Dunn =

Scottish professional golfer

Seymour Dunn (March 11, 1882 - January 8, 1959) was a Scottish professional golfer, designer of golf courses and author.

== Biography ==
He was born in North Berwick, Scotland, into a family long connected to the game of golf. His brother John Duncan Dunn was also an architect of golf courses. Their father Tom was a golf professional in London. Their mother, Isabella Gourley, was internationally known and a frequent winner of women's golf tournaments. Of their family, the most famous was William ("Willie") Dunn, who won the first United States Open in 1894. As a teenager, he began spending his summers in North America. When he was 15, he designed a nine-hole course at the Lawrenceville School in New Jersey. In the year 1906 he spent his first summer in Lake Placid, where he would soon return. By the age of 17, he was named pro at the Société de Golf de Paris.

In 1907, he moved to New York and was hired by the Van Cortlandt Park Golf Club in the Bronx. Shortly after, he would take the position as Golf Professional and Golf Club Maker at the Wykagyl Golf Club in New Rochelle, NY. In 1909, he designed the Links Course at the Lake Placid Club. The same club gave him the position of Golf Architect and Professional.

Later in his career he designed the Ticonderoga Country Club, now know as the Ticonderoga Golf Course, or TGC which was established in 1925 with its first 9 holes opening in 1926 and expanding to 18 holes in 1932.

In February 1908, he married Elizabeth Maxwell in Newcastle, County Down, Northern Ireland, her home town. Shortly thereafter, in early March 1908, they moved to Lake Placid, Essex County, New York. They would go on to have six children.

He was the golf pro at the Lake Placid Club from 1908 to 1929; despite the Great Depression he established the Dunn Golf School in 1929, and it survived for four years. The school held its classes in Madison Square Garden and later in Rockefeller Center. During his tenure in Lake Placid he designed many courses in the States (one of them as remote as the Country Club in Laurel, Mississippi) and abroad.

He used his position in Lake Placid to start his career as a manufacturer of golf clubs. In 1910, Dunn had 10 employees working at the shop, some of them at an assembly-line, which produced clubs and sold them via mail order throughout the United States.

In Lake Placid, he designed the Craig Wood Course and the Lake Placid Club Links Course. In his long career, he was commissioned to design courses for King Leopold II of Belgium, King Victor Emmanuel III of Italy, and Philippe de Rothschild.

== Publications ==
In addition to many articles published in golf magazines, Dunn wrote books applying a specific method. He used scientific and even religious parameters. In his 1922 book titled Golf Fundamentals, he devoted one section to the "Mechanical Laws of the Golf Swing," one to "Dynamic Laws of the Golf Stroke," one to "Golf Psychology," and the final one to "Seymour Dunn's Orthodoxy of Style." A list of his books follows:

- Lake Placid Club Golf Courses (Lake Placid, NY: Lake Placid Club, 1910).
- Golf Fundamentals: Orthodoxy of Style [with illustrations] (Lake Placid, NY: Seymour Dunn [1922])
- Standardized Golf Instruction (Long Island City, NY [1934]).
- [with Al Ross] The Complete Golf Joke Book (New York: Stravon Publishers, 1953).
