= Vincent Dunn =

American firefighter

- Born: May 12, 1935 (age 91); Queens, New York
- Known for: High-rise firefighting / rescue advocate
- Website: http://www.vincentdunn.com/

Vincent Joseph Dunn (born May 12, 1935) is a retired firefighter who served the New York Fire Department for 42 years, rising in rank to Commander of Division 3 (Midtown Manhattan). A longtime contributing editor to Firehouse Magazine, he is the author of nine books on firefighting and one memoir. He published two of his books before his 1999 retirement from New York City Fire Department: "Collapse of Burning Buildings: A Guide to Fireground Safety," 1988; and "Safety and Survival on the Fireground," 1992. His later books are "Command and Control of Fires and Emergencies," 2000; "Strategy of Firefighting," 2007; "Building Construction the Firefighters Battlespace," 2018; "Fire the Battlespace Enemy," 2020; Battlespace Combat," 2020; "Skyscraper Battlespace High-Rise Firefighting," published 2022, and “Battlespace Life-or-Death Decisions,” published 2023. All of Chief Dunn's books are available at vincentdunn.com.

Chief Dunn is an internationally recognized expert on high-rise firefighting, rescue, and building collapse. The National Institute of Standards and Technology (NIST), an agency of the United States Department of Commerce, selected him to serve as a consultant in its investigation into the collapse of the World Trade Center's Twin Towers and 7 World Trade Center.

He graduated from the two-year Queens Vocational Trade School and enlisted in the U.S. Navy when he was 17. He earned his GED while in the Navy and took the FDNY test 10 days after his honorable discharge at age 21. He joined the FDNY on Feb. 1, 1957. Later, at the urging of a fellow firefighter, he attended college on the GI Bill, becoming the first in his extended family to graduate from college. Chief Dunn earned an associate degree in Fire Administration in 1962, a bachelor's degree in sociology in 1976 and a master's degree in Urban Studies in 1979, all from Queens College, City University of New York.

As well as working for the FDNY and writing, Chief Dunn went on to teach. He was an instructor in the New York City Fire Department Division of Training from 1970 to 1974, teaching “Fire Prevention." He was an adjunct professor at Manhattan College from 1980 to 1983, teaching “Fire Protection Design," educating engineering students on the importance of fire loading design on concrete and fire resistant buildings, and how it related to structural integrity and building survivability. From 1984 to 1985 he was an instructor, at the National Fire Academy, teaching “Command and Control of Major Fires and Emergencies," and from 1998 to 2000, he was an adjunct professor at John Jay College, where he taught “Strategy of Firefighting."

In 1991, he was named "Man of the Year" by the Society of Fire Protection Engineers; in 1995 he received the Edward W. Whalen Award from the New York City Fire Safety Directors Association; he received Lifetime Achievement Awards in 1999 from Fire Engineering Magazine, in 2000 from the New York City Fire Department and in 2017 the Friends of Firefighters. In 2012, he received the FDNY Honor Legion Society Award.

Chief Dunn wrote in his August 2000 newsletter, "The best-kept secret in America's fire service is that firefighters cannot extinguish a fire in a 20- or 30,000-square-foot open floor area in a high-rise building. A fire company advancing a 2.5-inch hoseline with a 1.25-inch nozzle discharges only 300 gallons per minute and can extinguish only about 2,500 square feet of fire. The reach of the streams is only 50 feet. A modern open-floor office design, with cubicle work stations and dwarf partitions that do not extend to the ceiling, allows fire to spread throughout an entire 100 × 200-foot floor area. A fully involved, free burning 20,000-square-foot floor area cannot be extinguished by a couple of firefighters spraying a hose stream from a stairway. City managers and department chiefs will not admit this to the public if they want to keep their jobs. But every fireground commander knows this is a fact."

In the Jan. 1, 2002, issue of Fire Engineering, an article co-written by Chief Dunn regarding the collapse of the three World Trade Center towers stated, "Now, with that understanding, you would think we would have the largest fire investigation in world history. You would be wrong. Instead, we have a series of unconnected and uncoordinated superficial inquiries. No comprehensive 'Presidential Blue Ribbon Commission'. No top-notch National Transportation Safety Board-like response. Ironically, we will probably gain more detailed information about the destruction of the planes than we will about the destruction of the towers. We are literally treating the steel removed from the site like garbage, not like crucial fire scene evidence."
