= Megan Dunn =

Megan Dunn may refer to:

- Megan Dunn (cyclist) (born 1991), Australian racing cyclist
- Megan Dunn (British politician) (born 1990/1991), British student union leader
