= Blanche Dunn =

American socialite and actress

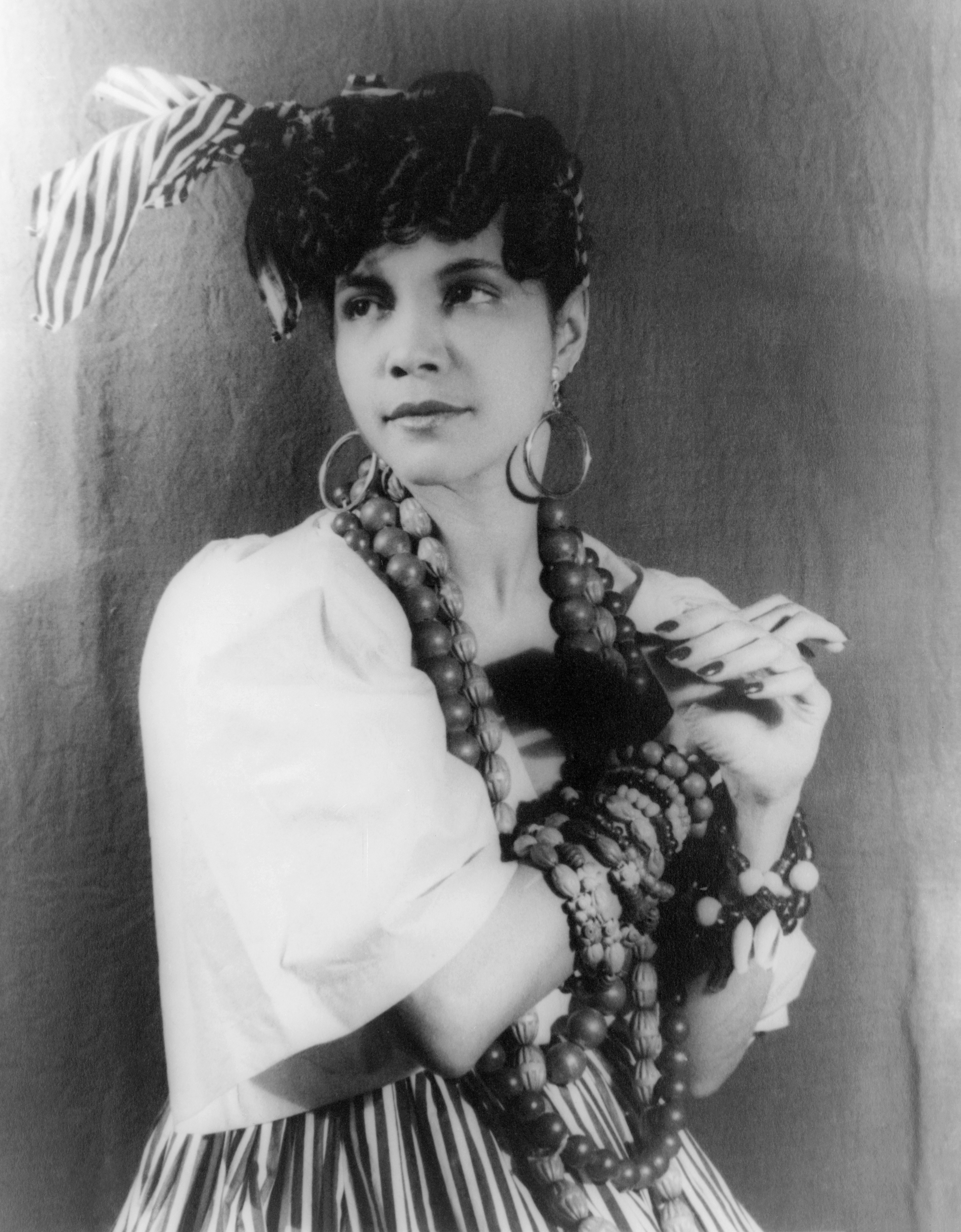
Blanche Dunn (1941). Photograph by Carl Van Vechten

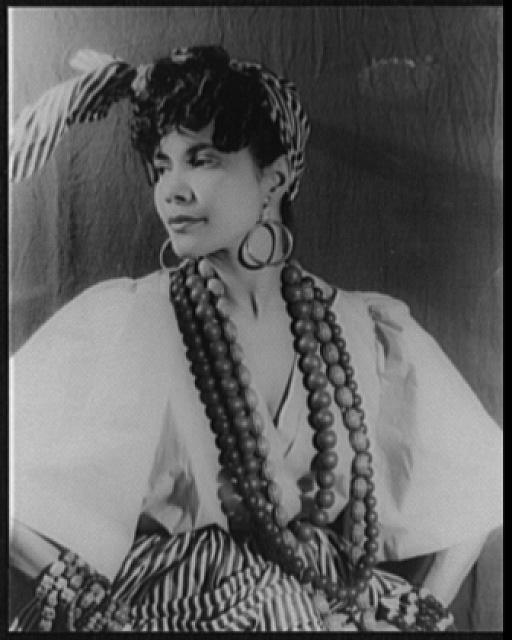
Blanche Dunn (1941). Photograph by Carl Van Vechten

Blanche Dunn (born April 1911, date of death unknown) was a Jamaican-American socialite and actress of the Harlem Renaissance era. Photographs of her taken by Carl Van Vechten are numerous, and the writer and painter Richard Bruce Nugent wrote about her.

== Life and career ==
Blanche Dunn was born in Jamaica in 1911 and arrived in New York City in 1926. She had a role in the Broadway show Blackbirds of 1930 and the film The Emperor Jones (1933). She became a mainstay of the Harlem social scene, attending parties, galas, and Broadway opening nights. Writer Richard Bruce Nugent notes that "a party was not a party, a place not a place, without Blanche." She lived for a time in 1940 at Whale Cay in the Bahamas with speed boat racer Joe Carstairs. Dunn posed several times for photographer Carl Van Vechten between 1924 and 1941, notably in 1941 for his series Portrait Photographs of Celebrities. She eventually married and moved to Capri, Italy.
