= Governor Dunn =

Governor Dunn may refer to:

- David Dunn (Maine politician) (1811–1894), 18th Governor of Maine
- Thomas Dunn (lieutenant-governor) (1729–1818), Governor General of British North America from 1805 to 1807
- Winfield Dunn (born 1927), 43rd Governor of Tennessee

== See also ==
- Edward Fitzsimmons Dunne (1853–1937), 24th Governor of Illinois
