= Harry Dunn =

Harry Dunn may refer to:

- Harry Dunn (gangster) (1892–1916), St. Louis gangster and member of the Egan's Rats
- Harry Dunn (boxer) (1906–1978), British Olympic boxer
- Harry Dunn (1947–2017), drummer for The Hullaballoos
- Harry Dunn (footballer, born 1948), English football manager and player, associated with Scarborough F.C.
- Harry Dunn (footballer, born 1953), also known as Harry A. Dunn, English football player and manager
- Harry Dunn, Scottish youth football scout accused of historical sex offences, died awaiting trial in 2017
- Harry Dunn (police officer) (born 1983), American police officer who responded to the January 6 United States Capitol attack
- Death of Harry Dunn (2001–2019), British man killed in a road traffic collision resulting in a UK/US diplomatic controversy

== See also ==
- Henry Dunn (disambiguation)
