= Tim Dunn =

Tim Dunn may refer to:

- Tim Dunn (businessman) (born 1955), American businessman
- Tim Dunn (historian) (born 1981), British historian
- Tim Dunn (politician) (born 1966), American politician
