= Edward Dunn =

Edward Dunn may refer to:

- Edward Dunn (politician) (1880–1945), British Labour Party politician
- Edward John Dunn (1844–1937), Australian geologist
- Edward Dunn (bishop) (1868–1955), Anglican bishop who moved to Belize
- Edward T. Dunn (1920–2016), American football player and coach
- Teddy Dunn (born 1980 as Edward Wilkes Dunn), Australian-born American stage, television and film actor
- Ed Dunn of Dunn Bros, an American coffeehouse franchise company founded 1987

== See also ==
- Edward Dunne (disambiguation)
- Albert Dunn (Albert Edward Dunn, 1864–1937), British Liberal Party politician
