= Frederick Dunn =

Frederick Dunn may refer to:

- Frederick Grant Dunn (1905–1959), American criminal
- Frederic Stanley Dunn (1872–1937), American scholar of classical studies and Ku Klux Klan leader
- Frederick Sherwood Dunn (1893–1962), American scholar of international law
