= Samuel Dunn =

Samuel Dunn may refer to:

- Samuel Orace Dunn (1877–1958), American transportation specialist
- Samuel Dunn (minister) (1798–1882), Free Church Methodist minister and religious journalist
- Samuel Dunn (mathematician) (died 1794), English mathematician
- Sam Dunn (born 1974), Canadian musician and film maker
- Sam Dunn (rugby league), rugby league player
