= Mary Dunn =

Mary Dunn may refer to:

- Marie Prevost (1896–1937), Canadian-American actress born Mary Bickford Dunn
- Mary Dunn (writer) (1900–1958), British author who created Lady Blanche Addle
- Mary Dunn (yoga) (1942–2008), American Iyengar yoga instructor
- Mary Maples Dunn (1931–2017), American historian
- Mary Dunn (sports executive) (1903–1965), Canadian sports executive
