= General Dunn =

General Dunn may refer to:

- Peter Dunn (general) (born 1947), Australian Army major general
- Thomas W. Dunn (1908–1983), U.S. Army lieutenant general
- Troy E. Dunn (fl. 1990s–2020s), U.S. Air Force major general
- William McKee Dunn (1814–1887), U.S. Army brigadier general

== See also ==
- Francis Plunkett Dunne (died 1874), British Army major general
- Martyn Dunne (born 1950), New Zealand Army major general
