= Arthur William Dunn =

American educator

Arthur William Dunn (March 12, 1868– 1927) was an American educator, born at Galesburg, Illinois, and educated at Knox College and the University of Chicago. He began his career as instructor in English and lecturer in sociology at the University of Cincinnati (1896–98). He was also extension lecturer from 1896 to 1900, and from the latter year until 1910 headed the department of history and civics in the Shortridge High School, Indianapolis. From 1906 to 1910 he was director of civic education in the public schools of the same city; in 1910–11, he was civic secretary of the City Club of Philadelphia; in 1911–14, he served as executive secretary of the Public Education Association, New York City; and from 1914 to 1921, he held the office of specialist in civic education in the United States Bureau of Education. In 1920 he was appointed special adviser to the United States Navy in the civic education of men on shipboard, becoming, in the following year, associate national director of the Junior Red Cross, and being advanced to the position of national director in 1921. He was the author of:

- The Community and the Citizen (1907)
- The Teaching of Community Civics (with others, 1915)
- Social Studies in Secondary Education (1916)
- Citizenship in School and Out (with Hannah Margaret Norris; 1920)
- Community Civics and Rural Life (1920)
- Community Civics for City Schools (1921)
