= Richard Dunn (footballer) =

English footballer

Personal information
- Date of birth: 23 December 1919
- Place of birth: Easington, County Durham, England
- Date of death: December 1985 (aged 65–66)
- Place of death: Durham, England
- Position: Inside forward

Senior career*
Years	Team	Apps	(Gls)
–1937	Ferryhill Athletic		
1937–1949	West Ham United	11	(2)
1949–1951	Hartlepools United	13	(2)
- * Club domestic league appearances and goals

Richard Dunn (23 December 1919 – December 1985) was an English footballer who played in the Football League for West Ham United and Hartlepools United as an inside-forward.

Born in Easington, Dunn began his career at Ferryhill Athletic before moving to West Ham United in 1937. Dunn had not made a first-team appearance before the outbreak of the Second World War and served with the Essex Regiment and Royal Artillery after hostilities commenced.

Dunn spent over six years in the Army and made guest appearances for Hartlepools United, Preston North End and York City, as well as 35 appearances for West Ham in the League South, where he scored 23 goals. He also made an appearance for Tottenham Hotspur in September 1944, when he was called on as a spectator after the Spurs team had arrived with just four players.

After the war, Dunn made his competitive debut for West Ham on 9 September 1946, along with goalkeeper George Taylor, in a 3–2 defeat at Fulham. He made 11 appearances in the Second Division before moving to Hartlepools United.
