= Jean Dunn =

Jean Dunn may refer to

- Jean Dunn (diplomat) (f. 2000s–2010s), Australian diplomat
- Jean Dunn (cyclist) (born c. 1934), British track cyclist

== See also ==
- Jean Dun (died 1735), French opera singer
