= Keith Dunn =

Keith Dunn(e) may refer to:

- Keith Dunn (musician), American harmonica player, singer, producer and songwriter
- Keith Dunn (footballer) (1906–1962), Australian rules footballer
- Keith Dunne (born 1982), Irish footballer
