= Sarah Dunn =

Sarah Dunn may refer to:

- Sarah Dunn (author) (born 1975), American writer
- Sarah Jayne Dunn (born 1981), British actress
