= Viv Dunn =

Australia international rugby union player

- Born: Vivian Alphonsus Dunn; 27 July 1895 Junee, New South Wales
- Died: 19 October 1974 (aged 79)

Rugby union career
- Position: number eight
International career
Years	Team	Apps	(Points)
1920–21	Wallabies	7	(0)

Vivian Alphonsus "Viv" Dunn (27 July 1895 – 19 October 1974) was a rugby union player who represented Australia.

Dunn, a number eight, was born in Junee, New South Wales and claimed a total of 7 international rugby caps for Australia.
