= Cary Dunn =

American silversmith

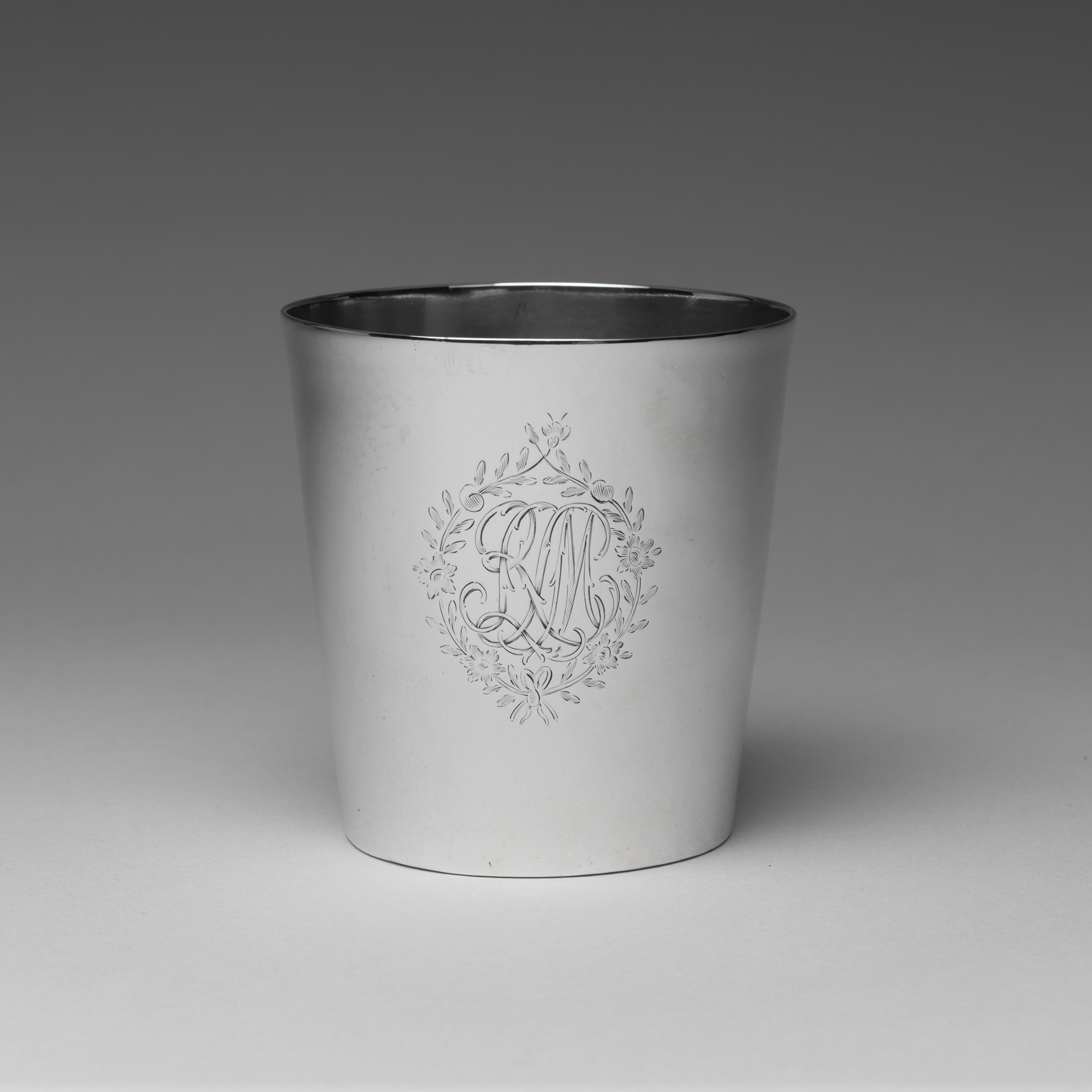
Beaker by Cary Dunn, circa 1770

Cary Dunn (June 11, 1732 – ?) was an American silversmith, active in New York City and New Jersey.

Dunn was born in Newport, Rhode Island, where he married Ann Atkinson on November 1, 1754. In 1762 he apparently enlisted in the New York Militia, and in 1765 he was made freeman of New York City, where he worked from 1759-1776 as a silversmith with his shop on Crown Street. In an invoice of January 28, 1775, he billed Philip Schuyler for making 9 gold mourning rings. When the British occupied New York in 1776, he fled to Morristown, New Jersey, where he worked from 1776–1782, and subsequently to Newark, New Jersey, where he worked from 1782–1783. However, in the New-York Packet of January 5, 1784, he advertised that: "Cary Dunn, Gold and Silver Smith, Begs leave to acquaint his friends and the public in general, that he is returned to this city from New Jersey, after a seven years exile—that he carries on his business as usual, at the old corner house, where he formerly lived, between the Fly Market and New-Dutch Church, No. 23 Crown-Street." He was a member of Gold and Silver Smiths' Society in 1786, and from 1786-1792 he partnered in the city with his son Cary Dunn (born June 10, 1759) as C. Dunn & Son, then worked in his own practice from 1793–1796.

Dunn's works are collected in the Metropolitan Museum of Art and Museum of Fine Arts, Boston.
