= The Southern Soldier =

American Civil War Confederate song

"The Southern Soldier", is a 19th century song about a Confederate soldier's perspective of the American Civil War and their experience in battle. It is a folk song as it has no definitive author and was passed down orally. The song's lyrics provided a true-to-life perception of the Civil War by describing the life of a Confederate soldier and their toils in fighting and parting from home. The song was widely in circulation among soldiers of the Confederacy as a rallying or marching song for its message and united cause of fighting against the Union. Despite being a pro-Confederate song, it remained popular throughout and after the Civil War for its down-to-Earth lyrics and display of humanity in the soldiers, and the song survived in minstrel shows or singing.

In the present however, the song is mostly forgotten and lacks much documentation due to primarily surviving by oral singing. Nevertheless, it has had a cultural impact on the American South and the Confederate States of America, by asserting the civilian mindset during the war and being an empathetic song to the soldiers, among the mainly militaristic songs of the time period. The song is preserved by bands or Southern heritage groups such as The Sons of Confederate Veterans, or the 2nd South Carolina String Band, allowing the song to survive through camp meets.

While the title, "The Southern Soldier Boy", is used interchangeably, it does also refer to a separate song that is often confused with "The Southern Soldier" due to pertaining to many of the same relatable and civilian outlooks on life during the Civil War.

== Lyrics ==
The Southern Soldier
- Lyrics: Unknown
- Music: Unknown, Unknown

Audio sample
- The Southern Soldier: file; help

I'll place my knapsack on my back
My rifle on my shoulder
I'll march away to the firing line
And kill that Yankee soldier
And kill that Yankee soldier
I'll march away to the firing line
And kill that Yankee soldier

I'll bid farewell to my wife and child
Farewell to my aged mother
And go and join in the bloody strife
Till this cruel war is over
Till this cruel war is over
I'll go and join in the bloody strife
Till this cruel war is over

If I am shot on the battlefield
And I should not recover
Oh, who will protect my wife and child
And care for my aged mother
And care for my aged mother
Oh, who will protect my wife and child
And care for my aged mother

And if our Southern cause is lost
And Southern rights denied us
We'll be ground beneath the tyrant's heel
For our demands of justice
For our demands of justice
We'll be ground beneath the tyrant's heel
For our demands of justice

Before the South shall bow her head
Before the tyrants harm us
I'll give my all to the Southern cause
And die in the Southern army
And die in the Southern army
I'll give my all to the Southern cause
And die in the Southern army

If I must die for my home and land
My spirit will not falter
Oh, here's my heart and here's my hand
Upon my country's altar
Upon my country's altar
Oh, here's my heart and here's my hand
Upon my country's altar

Then Heaven be with us in the strife
Be with the Southern soldier
We'll drive the mercenary horde
Beyond our Southern border
Beyond our Southern border
We'll drive the mercenary horde
Beyond our Southern border

== History ==
It is not exactly known where the song was written, or when. A song sung to the same tune titled ''Going to The Mexican War'' was recorded in Arthur Palmer Hudson's folksongs of Mississippi, which was published in 1936.

Page 8 of the Richmond Dispatch newspaper published on February 2 of 1902 has the publication of a song named ''March Away to Mexico'', this publication was requested by Mr. Walter E. Beverly. Telling the editor of the dispatch that it is an old tune, and that ''The following are the three stanzas of the song as I used to hear it sung now more than thirty years ago"

My pretty little Pink, I once did think,
That you and I would marry:
But now I've lost all earthly hope;
With you I cannot tarry.

I'll take my knapsack on my back,
My musket on my shoulder;
And march away to the Mexican War,
To be a valiant soldier.

There coffee grows on white-oak trees,
And rivers flow with brandy;
The rocks all shine with glittering gold,
And the gals are sweet as candy.

''Whether there were ever more than these three stanzas of the song I am not able to say. My old friend, Colonel Samuel J. Lamden, formerly of Worcester county, Md., but now residing at Onancock, on the Eastern Shore of Virginia, who served through the Mexican war, informed me that the three stanzas given above are all that he recollects having heard. He told me that the song was very popular just after the Mexican war, and that it was frequently sung at country frolics by young people as they marched, arm in arm, around the room. By the way, Colonel Lamden, I believe, is the only Mexican veteran now living on the Atlantic-Coast plain between Philadelphia and the capes of Virginia. He enlisted in Colonel Doniphan's regiment, marched across the plains, helped to capture New Mexico, and joined General Taylor at Buena Vista, travelling in all more than 6,000 miles.''

A page of the Yorkville Enquirer, a now long discontinued newspaper of South Carolina, had a message from Camp Calhoun located near Columbia which was published on April 18 of 1861. This message goes on to mention the volunteers, likely of the counties the Newspaper served.

"The volunteers are all in fine spirits this evening, though most of us are a little weary. "With my knapsack on my back and my rifle on my shoulder" sounds romantic enough in print; but we confess our back doesn't feel very romantic." This is attributed to an unknown Corporal of Company I ''Jasper Light Infantry'' of the 5th South Carolina Infantry.

Another newspaper, the Atlanta Constitution, published the following on the fifth page of the newspaper, dated to May 23rd of 1885.

"A Few Stanzas From Some Old Confederate War Songs. M. M. Folsom, in Valdosta, Times. The fresh young lips that warbled the songs of twenty years ago have grown withered and sere; but in the heart of many a dignified matron still lingers the echo of those stirring strains."

It went on to name some popular tunes of the Confederates, notably Dixie & Maryland My Maryland, later on he describes a song of ''more of a martial character''.

"I'll take my knapsack on my back,

My rifle on my shoulder;

Put on the gray, and march away,

For I'm bound to be a soldier."

The Frank C. Brown Collection of North Carolina Folklore, written by Frank C. Brown & the North Carolina Folklore Society contains elements of folklore, such as songs, collected by Frank C. Brown between 1912 & 1943. The book was published in 1952, and lists the following:

"A favorite play-party song pretty much everywhere that playparties are — or have been — in vogue is made up of three elements: a stanza beginning with the line liere chosen as title, another beginning "pretty little pink" (sometimes '"my blue-eyed gal") and another beginning "I'll put my knapsack on my back." It goes back to the Mexican War. As Sandburg remarks ( ASb 166) : "a dance song known in Kentucky, Indiana, and Illinois became a knapsack and marching tune with Mexican War references." For its range see the McLendon finding list, SFLQ viii 204 and 221, and add to the references there given Virginia (FSV 219–20) and the Ozarks (OFS III 296–7, 309, 311). Sometimes only two of the elements appear, and sometimes only one. Sometimes New Orleans or Quebec appears in place of Mexico, carrying the reference back to the War of 1812."

The song was first recorded by John A. Lomax, an American preservationist, sung by Mrs. Minta Morgan in 1937. A variation of the song called "The Northern Soldier", is told from the view of a Union soldier. It retains many of the same lyrics only for the exception that the perspective is shifted to that of a Northern soldier. It revealed the many common feelings and experiences that soldiers of both sides had held, often why it is highly regarded as a relatable Civil War song.
