= Henry Dunne =

Australian rules footballer

Personal information
- Full name: Henry Francis Dunne
- Born: 21 February 1872; Ballarat East
- Died: 7 October 1959 (aged 87); Auckland, New Zealand
- Original team: Austral Football Club
- Position: Forward / Back pocket

Playing career^{1}
Years	Club	Games (Goals)
1897–98	Carlton	24 (6)
- ^{1} Playing statistics correct to the end of 1898.

Henry Francis Dunne (21 February 1872 – 7 October 1959) was an Australian rules footballer who played with Carlton in the Victorian Football League (VFL).
