= Terrence P. Dunn =

American business executive

Terrence P. Dunn is an American business executive. He is known as the President and Chief Executive Officer of J.E. Dunn Construction Company, a position he has held since 1989. He is also affiliated with UMB Financial Corporation and Kansas City Southern. He is a member of the National Executive Board of the Boy Scouts of America and former chairman of the Federal Reserve Bank of Kansas City.
