= Alexander Dunn =

Alexander Dunn may refer to:

- Alexander Dunn (badminton) (born 1998), Scottish badminton player
- Alexander Dunn (mathematician), Australian mathematician
- Alexander Roberts Dunn (1833–1868), Canadian awarded the Victoria Cross
