= Matthew Dunn =

Matthew or Matt Dunn may refer to:

- Matthew A. Dunn (1886–1942), Democratic member of the U.S. House of Representatives from Pennsylvania
- Matt Dunn (author) (born 1966), British romantic comedy novelist
- Matthew Dunn (author) (born 1968), British novelist
- Matthew Dunn (swimmer) (born 1973), Australian Olympic freestyle and medley swimmer
- Matt Dunn (cricketer) (born 1992), English cricketer
- Matt Dunn (soccer) (born 1994), American soccer player

== See also ==
- Matt Dunne (born 1969), American politician
- Matt Done (born 1988), English footballer
