= Charles Dunn =

Charles Dunn or Charlie Dunn may refer to:

- Charles Dunn (Wisconsin politician) (1799–1872), American politician
- Charles J. Dunn (1872–1939), American jurist and politician
- Charles Morton Dunn (1892–1975), Canadian politician
- Charlie Dunn (c. 1898–1993), American bootmaker
- Charles Dunn (Japanologist) (1915–1995), British Japanologist

== See also ==
- Charles Dunne (born 1993), English footballer
