= Eddie Dunn =

Eddie Dunn may refer to:

- Eddie Dunn (actor) (1896–1951), American actor
- Eddie Dunn (American football) (1915–1980), American football coach
- Eddie Dunn (rugby union) (born 1955), New Zealand rugby union footballer
