= James Dunn (rugby league) =

English rugby league footballer

Personal information
- Full name: James Dunn
- Born: c. 1933 (age 91–92); Leeds, England

Playing information
Club
Years	Team	Pld	T	G	FG	P
1951–60	Leeds

James "Jimmy" Dunn (born c. 1933) is an English former professional rugby league footballer who played in the 1950s and 1960s. He played at club level for Leeds.

== Club career ==
Jimmy Dunn made his début for Leeds, and scored 8-goals against Bramley at Barley Mow, Bramley on Saturday 20 October 1951.
