= Margaret Dunn =

Margaret Houlihan
- Born: Cullen, County Cork
- Instrument: Bagpipes

Margaret Houlihan is an Irish bagpiper, originally from Cullen, County Cork, now living in Scotland.

== Life ==
She started learning the pipes when she was 9 years old and was initially taught by her father Con Houlihan. She later received lessons from Stephen Power and moved to Scotland when she was 17 to study piping at the Royal Scottish Academy of Music and Drama. Margaret was pipe major of Cullen Pipe Band from Cork when the band became world champions in Grade 3B in 2007.

While in Scotland she joined the grade 1 Shotts and Dykehead Caledonia Pipe Band and with them won the World Pipe Band Championships in 2000. In 2003 Houlihan graduated from the Royal Scottish Academy of Music and Drama, with an honours degree in Scottish Traditional Music.

In 2003 Houlihan became the first ever female player to win an A grade light music competition and in 2008 went on to be the first female player to ever play on the Former Winners March Strathspey & Reel competition stage at the Argyllshire Gathering in Oban.

She teaches at the National Piping Centre, and has been tutoring Connor Sinclair since 2004.

== Solo awards ==
- Northern Meetings Silver Medal in 2007
- 1st MacGregor Memorial Piobaireachd (22 and under) Oban 1999
- 1st B Grade March, Oban 1999
- 1st Duncan Johnstone Memorial Piobaireachd 2001
- 1st B Grade Piobaireachd, Inveraray 2003
- 1st Strachan Memorial MSR, London 2000
- 1st A Grade Strathspey and Reel, Oban 2003
- 1st A Grade March Argyllshire Gathering 2007
