= Jerry Dunn (runner) =

American long-distance runner

Jerry Dunn at the 2026 Battle of the Paddles in Placencia, Belize

Jerry Alan Dunn (born January 29, 1946) is an American marathon runner. Jim Murray of the LA Times dubbed him "America's Marathon Man" in 1993. He ran his first marathon in 1983 and had run 400 marathons by 2018. In interviews he has said that running has helped him deal with addiction. In addition to running in long distance races he has also helped to organize them.
