= Ian Dunn =

Ian Dunn may refer to:

- Ian Dunn (activist) (1943–1998), Scottish activist
- Ian Dunn (rugby union) (born 1960), New Zealand rugby union player

== See also ==
- Iain Dunn, English footballer
