= Paul Dunn =

Paul Dunn may refer to:

- Paul Dunn (American football coach) (born 1960), American football coach
- Paul Dunn (running back) (born 1948), American football running back
- Paul Dunn (rugby league) (born 1963), Australian rugby league footballer
- Paul H. Dunn (1924–1998), American Mormon leader
- Paul Dunn (playwright), Canadian playwright and actor

== See also ==
- Paul Dunne (disambiguation)
