= Dun, Angus =

Coordinates: 56.729722°N 2.5475°W

Dun
- Location within Angus
- OS grid reference: NO669593
- Council area: Angus
- Lieutenancy area: Angus
- Country: Scotland
- Sovereign state: United Kingdom
- Post town: Montrose
- Dialling code: 01674
- Police: Scotland
- Fire: Scottish
- Ambulance: Scottish
- UK Parliament: Angus
- Scottish Parliament: Angus North and Mearns

Dun is a rural parish in Angus, Scotland. It contains the House of Dun, home of the Erskine family and is a stop on the Caledonian Railway. It is located on the river South Esk, west of Montrose and east of Brechin.

In 1785–7, a bridge was built there across the South Esk.

The writer Violet Jacob was born at the House of Dun. William Chalmers Burns, a famous Scottish evangelist was born at Dun in 1815.
