= 1990 Armagh City roadside bomb =

Killing of four men by the Provisional IRA

- Part of The Troubles and Operation Banner
- Location: 54°20′44.28″N 6°41′9.16″W; Killylea Road, Armagh, County Armagh, Northern Ireland
- Date: 24 July 1990; 2.00PM (GMT)
- Target: RUC officers in unmarked vehicle
- Attack type: Roadside bomb
- Deaths: 3 Royal Ulster Constabulary officers 1 Civilian
- Injuries: 1
- Perpetrator: Provisional IRA

On 24 July 1990 the Provisional IRA (IRA) carried out an IED roadside bomb attack at the Killylea Road on the outskirts of Armagh City, County Armagh, Northern Ireland. An IRA active service unit detonated a large bomb as an unmarked Royal Ulster Constabulary (RUC) vehicle and a civilian car passed, killing three RUC officers and a Catholic nun.

== Background ==
On 9 April 1990 four UDR soldiers (Michael Adams, John Birch, John Bradley, Steven Smart) were killed in a similar attack when the IRA detonated a landmine under their patrol vehicle on Ballydugan Road, Downpatrick, County Down. The landmine contained over 1,000 lb (450 kg) of explosive.

== Ambush ==
On the afternoon of 24 July 1990, 37-year-old nun Catherine Dunne was driving an Austin Metro car with a passenger, Cathy McCann, a 25-year-old social worker. Some hours previously, members of the IRA took over a house close to Killylea Road, two miles outside Armagh, County Armagh, holding its occupants, a married couple and their children, at gunpoint.

A detonating wire was placed from the house to a 1,000 lb (450 kg) bomb, placed in a culvert under Killylea Road,. At approximately 2 p.m., as Dunne's car was driving to Armagh, a Royal Ulster Constabulary patrol car was traveling in the opposite direction. Dunne's car passed by the patrol car just as the police drove over the culvert, at which point the IRA detonated the bomb. Constable William James Hanson (37), and reserve officers Joshua Cyril Willis (35) and David Sterritt (34), were all killed instantly; their car was blown into the air and landed upside down.

Dunne and McCann were both severely injured. Dunne later died of her injuries.

Witness Paul Corr, owner of a petrol filling station nearby, said, "The ground shook beneath us and it was accompanied by a very large explosion. At first we did not see the police car. The whole place was a terrible mess. Then we saw two young girls in the [Austin Metro]. They were unconscious and looked in a pretty bad way. There was nothing we could do for the policemen. Nobody could have come out of that car alive. It was dreadful."

The bomb left a 20-foot-diameter crater in the two-lane road.

== Aftermath ==
Sister Fiona Fullham, a regional superior of the Sisters of St. Louis, said, "I would pray that all those in Northern Ireland who have been involved in violence would try to think of the human face of the people who have died and who are dying, and of the families who are suffering needlessly all these years ... I would say, please stop. Please stop." Sister Catherine was remembered as an athletic and lively woman, who was an enthusiastic jogger and swimmer.

Taoiseach Charles Haughey was quoted as saying, "I know all the people of Ireland join me in my condemnation of this atrocity."

The IRA released a message claiming responsibility for the attack, and called Dunne a victim of "unforeseen and fluke circumstances." The statement was rejected in advance by political and Catholic and Protestant leaders alike and politicians in Ireland and Great Britain.

Sinn Féin's Martin McGuinness said, "Our sorrow at these deaths is genuine and profound, but will be abused by our political opponents who will cynically exploit yesterday's events for their own political purpose."

Pope John Paul II sent a message to be read at Catherine's funeral in which he condemned the "grievous injustice and futility" of the murders that left him "deeply shocked and saddened." He implored "the men and women who espouse violence to recognise the grievous injustice and futility of terrorism."

One man was cconvicted of the bombing and received a life sentence, but was released in 2000 under the terms of the Good Friday Agreement.
