= Harvey Dunn Jr. =

Australian rules footballer

Harvey Dunn

Personal information
- Full name: Harvey Dunn, Jr.
- Born: 6 September 1931
- Died: 7 June 2013 (aged 81)
- Original team: Box Hill
- Height: 170 cm (5 ft 7 in)
- Weight: 71 kg (157 lb)

Playing career^{1}
Years	Club	Games (Goals)
1951–54	Carlton	9 (4)
- ^{1} Playing statistics correct to the end of 1954.

Harvey Dunn (6 September 1931 – 7 June 2013) was an Australian rules footballer who played with Carlton in the Victorian Football League (VFL).

Dunn was notably the first player ever recruited under the father–son rule; he was residentially tied to North Melbourne, but his father, Harvey Dunn Sr., had played for Carlton. To avoid playing for North Melbourne, Dunn played for then-Eastern District Football League club Box Hill, where Dunn Sr. was coach in 1949 and 1950, before receiving the father-son clearance to Carlton in 1951 once the rule was established.

Dunn never played regular senior football for Carlton, and in 1954 he was cleared back to Box Hill in the Victorian Football Association. He won the club best and fairest in 1955 and played there until 1959.
