= Emily Dunn =

Emily Dunn may refer to:

- Emily Newton Dunn (born 1972), English TV presenter
- Emily Dunn (actress) (born 1982), American actress and dancer
