= Harvey Dunn Sr. =

Australian rules footballer

Harvey Dunn

Personal information
- Full name: Harvey Louis Dunn
- Born: 6 August 1899; Carlton North, Victoria
- Died: 12 September 1961 (aged 62); Niddrie, Victoria
- Original team: Carlton District
- Height: 164 cm (5 ft 5 in)
- Weight: 74 kg (163 lb)

Playing career^{1}
Years	Club	Games (Goals)
1924–29	Carlton	71 (139)
- ^{1} Playing statistics correct to the end of 1929.

Harvey Louis Dunn (6 August 1899 – 12 September 1961) was an Australian rules footballer who played with Carlton in the Victorian Football League (VFL). His son, Harvey Dunn Jr., also played for Carlton and was notably the first player recruited under the father–son rule.

Dunn spent time as the coach of the Box Hill Football Club, and was its inaugural Victorian Football Association coach in 1951. He later coached the Carlton Thirds from 1953 until 1955.
