= Brian Dunn =

Brian Dunn may refer to:

- Brian Joseph Dunn (born 1955), Canadian Roman Catholic bishop
- Brian J. Dunn, American businessman from Minnesota
- Brian Dunn (tennis) (born 1974), American tennis player from Florida
