= Jason Dunn =

Jason Dunn may refer to:

- Jason Dunn (American football) (born 1973), American football tight end
- Jason Dunn (soccer) (born 1971), retired American soccer forward
- Jason Dunn, former lead singer of the Christian rock band Hawk Nelson
- Jason Dunn, owner of Facedown Records, drummer for No Innocent Victim
- Jason R. Dunn, American attorney
