= Les Dunn =

Australian rules footballer

Personal information
- Full name: Les Dunn
- Born: 16 February 1915
- Died: 26 October 2009 (aged 94)
- Height: 175 cm (5 ft 9 in)
- Weight: 73 kg (161 lb)

Playing career^{1}
Years	Club	Games (Goals)
1938	South Melbourne	1 (0)
- ^{1} Playing statistics correct to the end of 1938.

Les Dunn (16 February 1915 – 26 October 2009) was an Australian rules footballer who played with South Melbourne in the Victorian Football League (VFL).
