= Robbie Dunn (musician) =

Irish folk singer-songwriter

Robbie Peter Dunn (born 28 October 1951, in Dublin) is a well-known Irish folk singer songwriter based in Brisbane, Australia.

== Early life ==
Robbie was born into a musical family where singing was the norm. He left school at the age of 15 and became a chef working in Donegal where he also sang in small bands. He worked at The Clarence Hotel in Dublin before moving to London, where he trained in French and Italian cuisine under French Masterchef, Raymond Zarb.

While in London he sang in a blues band. During the late 1960s and early 1970s in London he became aware of racism for the first time when people turned their backs on him when they heard his Irish accent.

== Musical career ==
Although being a successful chef, singing was always part of his life and he did so in many of Dublin's famous pubs

It was not until he met the Irish Seanchai, Liam Weldon in Tailors' Hall, Dublin in 1978 that his true musical and writing career took off. Liam's influence on Robbie through his lyrics and singing was profound. Liam Weldon's lyrics took on a Celtic spiritual dimension, Pantheism, that Robbie had been searching for. This was the trend that was to run through Robbie's writings from then on.

=== Message in his songs ===
In all his albums there are messages of love and compassion most of his songs have a Celtic spiritual message about discovering the wonders that exist inside every human being. From the Irish Wedding Song comes the lyrics The wonders of creation, the salmon in the pool, the essence of the love that permeates this room, the riddle of the universe was carved upon the stones, when you comprehend the oneness you will never walk alone.

From his song Pick Up The Phone comes the lyrics Everybody needs a little time and space, to put life's trials and tribulations back in their place, to heal the spirit to touch the soul, to find the inner peace that will fill that hole.

He believes that it is only by loving ourselves can we bring an end to violence in the world.

=== Musical styles ===
Robbie is a traditional Dublin balladeer who tells stories through songs and music, carrying the message as many folk singers have before him. His major influences have been his mother Rose, Liam Weldon, John Lennon, Percy French and Jock Montgomery.

He has many musical styles and has also written many comic songs.

== Political and social agenda ==
Robbie became politically aware in Derry in 1967 while staying at a friends house in the Bogside. On a Monday morning, the mother of one of his friends left for work and the father stayed at home to look after the kids. When asked why his dad did not work he was told "We are nationalists, they will not give us work."

On returning to Dublin he became involved with social issues and has continued working for civil rights for people whenever he can. He took part in many peace rallies and protest marches through the 1970s and 1980s. One of his early songs was in reference to a young girl, Carol Kelly, being shot dead by a plastic bullet in Belfast. Many of his songs refer to the futility of war, including War Is Just For Losers, Only Fools Talk Of War, which have both been performed at many peace rallies and concerts. One of his more recent songs is entitled War Is A Mental Disease. He does not believe in nationalism or man-made religion as he feels they only divide people.
