= Ronald Dunn =

Ronald Dunn may refer to:

- Ron Dunn (baseball) (born 1950), American baseball player
- Ron Dunn (footballer) (1928–2011), Australian rules footballer
- Ron Dunn (politician), member of the New Hampshire House of Representatives
- Ronald Dunn (sport shooter) (born 1943), Ecuadorian sports shooter
- Ronnie Dunn (born 1953), American singer-songwriter
- Ronnie Dunn (footballer) (1908–1994), English footballer
