= Leith Dunn =

Jamaican sociologist

Leith Dunn PhD

Academic background
- Education: University of the West Indies; London School of Economics (PhD)
- Thesis: A sociological analysis of methods of organising used by women in Caribbean Free Trade zones: Implications for development. (1994)

Leith Lorraine Dunn is a Jamaican sociologist, writer and academic.

She taught at the University of the West Indies where she focused on gender and human rights, as well as acting for a consultant to the United Nations and the Caribbean Community. In 2020, she was presented the Award for Excellence by Jamaica's National Family Planning Board.

== Education ==
Dunn has a bachelor's degree in languages and social sciences, and a master's degree in sociology from the University of the West Indies. She has a PhD in sociology and economics from London School of Economics, and was an honorary research fellow at the University of Toronto.

== Career ==
Dunn taught courses on disaster risk management, gender and climate change at the University of the West Indies (UWI), where she also focused on gender equity in governance and leadership, human trafficking, human rights, trade and tourism, labour, and health. She was the head of UWI's Mona Unit.

In 2020, Dunn was awarded the inaugural Jamaican National Family Planning Board's Award for Excellence.

She has also worked for Christian Aid; the Commonwealth Observer Group as an election monitor in Zimbabwe, Zambia, Rwanda, and Malawi; and as a consultant to both the United Nations Population Fund and the Caribbean Community.

Dunn's chapter in the 2016 book Men, Masculinities and Disaster pointed out how poverty, sexuality, ability were factors increasing the risk to men from climate change.

== Selected publications ==
- Scafe, Suzanne; Dunn, Leith L., eds. (2022). African-Caribbean Women Interrogating Diaspora/Post-Diaspora. Routledge, Taylor & Francis. ISBN 9780367726133.
- Dunn, Leith (2016). "Integrating men and masculinities in Caribbean disaster risk management". In Enarson, Elaine; Pease, Bob (eds.). Men, Masculinities and Disaster. Routledge. doi:10.4324/9781315678122. ISBN 978-1-315-67812-2.
- Scafe, Suzanne; Dunn, Leith (2020). "African-Caribbean women interrogating diaspora/Post-diaspora". African and Black Diaspora. 13 (2): 127–133. doi:10.1080/17528631.2020.1740471. S2CID 221062435.
