= Lady Dunn =

Lady Dunn may refer to:

- Marcia Anastasia Christoforides, (1910–1994)
- Lydia Dunn, Baroness Dunn (born 1940)
