= Joe Dunn =

Joe or Joseph Dunn may refer to:

== Sports ==
- Joe Dunn (baseball) (1885–1944), American baseball player
- Red Dunn (Joseph Dunn, 1901–1957), American football running back
- Jake Dunn (Joseph P. Dunn Jr., 1909–1984), American baseball player
- Joe Dunn (footballer) (1925–2005), Scottish football player and manager
- Joe Lee Dunn (1946–2021), American football coach

== Others ==
- Joseph Dunn (entrepreneur) (1746–1827), English priest and entrepreneur
- Joseph Dunn (shark victim), survivor of the Jersey Shore shark attacks of 1916
- Joe Dunn (California politician) (born 1958), California state senator
- Joe Dunn (Illinois politician) (born 1968), Illinois politician

== See also ==
- Joe Dunne (disambiguation)
