= Dan Dunn (writer) =

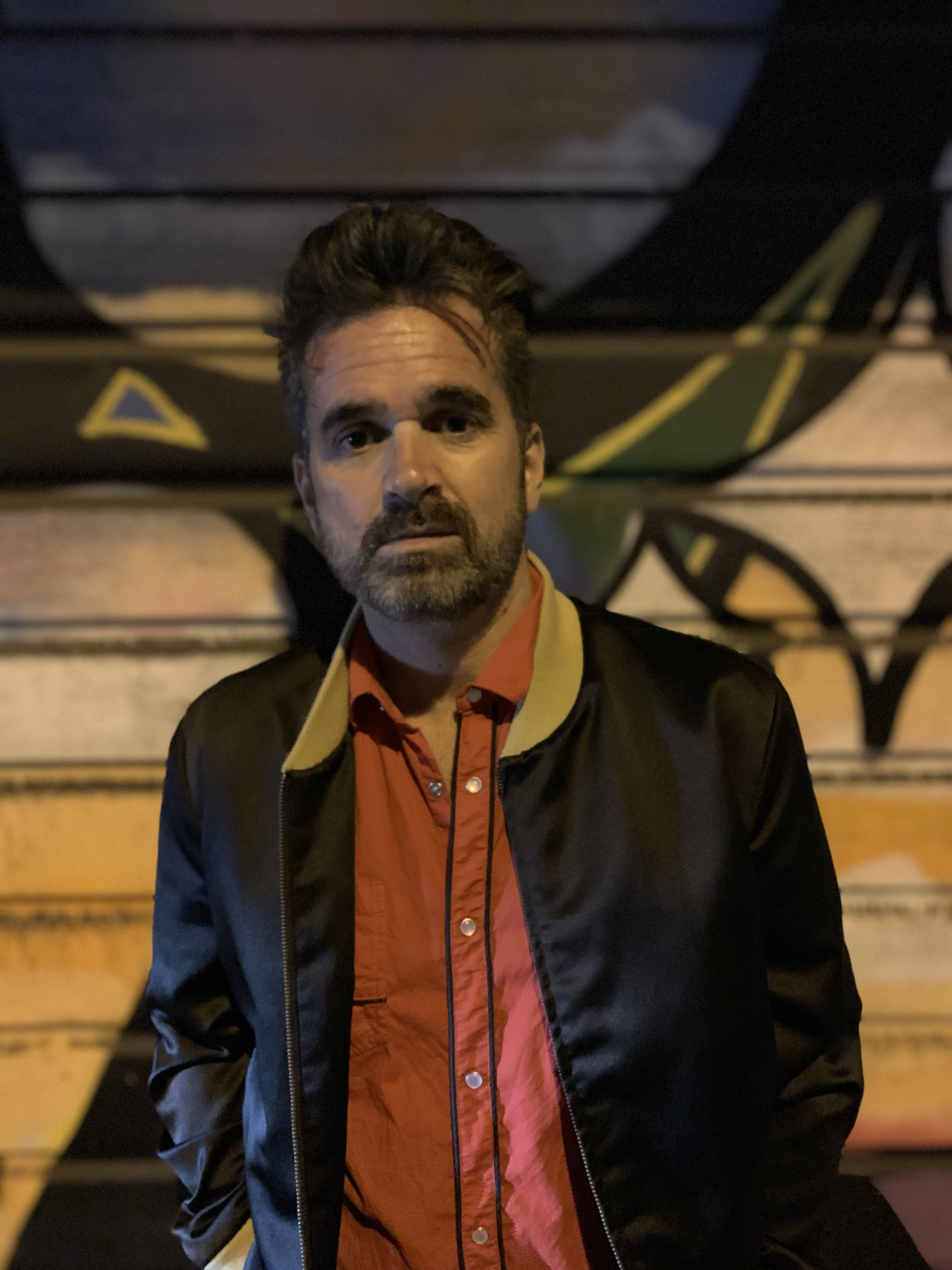

Dan Dunn (born July 14, 1968) is an American writer, journalist, podcaster and former host of the SiriusXM satellite radio program, Dan Dunn's Happy Hour and the celebrity/drinking themed podcast Drinky Fun Time.. In June 2019 he launched the podcast What We're Drinking with Dan Dunn, which is part of Dan Harmon's Starburns Audio network. Guests on Dunn's shows have included Anthony Bourdain, Guillermo Del Toro, Halsey, Kiefer Sutherland, G Eazy and Maynard James Keenan. Dunn is a regular contributor to The Robb Report. He wrote a comedic wine and spirits column called “The Imbiber” for Playboy as well as for the website Food Republic. He was also a columnist for Wine Access in Canada and a nightlife guide for Mutineer magazine.

He worked as a staff writer for the Emmy-nominated TV show Talk Soup and freelance joke writer for Saturday Night Live’s “Weekend Update”, Dunn’s semi-fictional memoir called Nobody Likes a Quitter (and other reasons to avoid rehab) was critically acclaimed, and was published in November 2007 by Perseus Books. His second book, Living Loaded: Tales of sex, salvation and the pursuit of the never-ending happy hour was published by Random House/Crown in February 2011. Living Loaded was developed into a scripted comedy series for Fox by Dunn and Rob McElhenney, creator of the FX series, It's Always Sunny in Philadelphia. Glenn Howerton, star of It's Always Sunny in Philadelphia, cited Dunn as the "driving force" behind The 7 Secrets of Awakening the Highly Effective Four-Hour Giant, Today, a faux self-help which lists the show’s characters as authors. It was published by Dey Street Books/HarperCollins in January 2015. Dunn's memoir American Wino: A Tale of Reds, Whites and One Man's Blues was published by Dey Street Books/HarperCollins in April 2016. Critic Ray Isle, writing for Food & Wine, called American Wino "a multi-state Sideways, but with only one character. Luckily Dunn is a lively, funny companion."

Dunn’s work appeared in numerous high-profile publications including GQ, USA Today, Maxim, the Los Angeles Times, LA Style, and Entertainment Weekly. Prior to being picked up by Playboy in 2009, Dunn’s “The Imbiber” column appeared weekly for several years in Metro International.

Dunn was a regular guest on the Playboy Radio Morning Show on Sirius/XM satellite radio, The Tasting Room with Tom Leykis, and hosted The Imbiber Show podcast for The New Normal Network. He has made guest appearances on The Adam Carolla Show and Conan.

He grew up in Philadelphia, PA, and is a 1991 graduate of Temple University with a BA in journalism.
