= Kevin Dunn (disambiguation) =

Kevin Dunn (born 1956) is an American actor.

Kevin Dunn may also refer to:

- Kevin Dunn (bishop) (1950–2008), English bishop
- Kevin Dunn (musician) (born 1951), American guitarist
- Kevin Dunn, former executive producer of WWE
