= Moncena Dunn =

Moncena Dunn may refer to:

- Moncena Dunn (inventor), 1867–1944, inventor of the fraud-proof ballot
- Moncena Dunn (soldier), 1823–1895
