= Rae Dunn =

American ceramist

- Born: September 13, 1962 (age 64); Fresno, California, United States
- Occupations: Ceramist, company founder

Rae Dunn (born September 13, 1962), is an American ceramist best known for her eponymous brand of ceramic wares and pottery.

== Early life ==
Rae Dunn was born in Fresno, California, where she grew up. Her brand's about page describes her as a classical pianist and painter. Dunn began taking piano lessons at the age of four. In her youth, Dunn and her siblings were in a band named "The Dunns". She earned a Bachelor of Arts Degree from her hometown Fresno State in Industrial Design before moving to San Francisco in the 1980s.

While in San Francisco, Dunn worked in retail, graphic design, and fashion, and also opened a French bistro in Pacific Heights with her then-fiancé.

== Working with clay ==
Dunn later found a passion for clay art while working as a waitress in 1994. Her waitressing job allowed her free time during the day, which she used to go exploring. Then in her 30s, while walking in San Francisco's Golden Gate Park, Dunn came across the Sharon Art Studio. The public space offered workshops and classes; Dunn signed up for a clay art class after flipping a coin. Dunn's work is "strongly influenced by the Japanese aesthetic of wabi-sabi". Country Living described Dunn's art style as "simple, cozy, and organic."

In 1995, she began to pursue ceramics full-time and founded her eponymous brand. Her designs are reminiscent of many works throughout the 20th century, notably bauhaus artist Theodor Bogler’s work for Haus Am Horn. Her ceramic work was featured in Martha Stewart Living. In 2013, Dunn opened her own studio and gallery.

== Brand ==
After deciding to pursue ceramic art as a full-time career, she founded her eponymous brand of ceramic wares in 1995. She later secured a licensing deal with Magenta, Inc. and since 2003, the ceramics manufacturer has mass-produced her line of wares. The brand gained increased popularity in the 2010s due to a confluence of the "farmhouse chic" trend and rise of social media platforms such as Instagram and Facebook.

The brand's wares are known for featuring simple designs and one- or two-word phrases, like "yum" or "family" emblazoned on them. These phrases are also labeled with the brand's signature font, a "delicate, unadorned, hand-crafted" typeface. White or cream-colored ceramic mugs and containers have been cited by media outlets as among the brand's most popular.

Products from the brand have been cited to be considerably coveted, with shoppers of the brand lining up early prior to a store's opening in order to acquire products. Dunn's brand has attracted a cult following, with shoppers being nicknamed "Rae Dunners" and "Rae Dunn Women" and labeled as "rabid" and "feral" by media outlets. Additionally, "a voraciously focused secondary market of resellers, traders, and collectors has grown around the brand." Dunn herself has acknowledged the following behind her brand, referring to it as a "weird phenomenon" that she never intended to cause. She also expressed being sad and upset about resellers, stating "I wish I could sell more of my handmade stuff. But when I do it, I know that people are buying it and reselling it for hundreds of dollars more," adding "I feel like I'm just being used."

== Other ventures ==
Since launching her brand, Dunn has ventured into writing. She has authored three books.

== Personal life ==
Dunn is married and resides in the San Francisco Bay Area, having been based in Berkeley and Emeryville. She also has annual residencies in France. Dunn has been cited as "shy", "quiet", and "an introvert" in her personal life.

== Bibliography ==
- Wilma's World: Good Advice from a Good Dog (2015)
- France: Inspiration du Jour (2017)
- In Pursuit of Inspiration: Trust Your Instincts and Make More Art (2019)
