= Pat Dunn =

Pat Dunn or Patricia Dunn or Patrick Dunn may refer to:

Pat

- Pat Dunn (1858–1938), American mogul known as "The Duke of Padre Island" (see Nueces Hotel)
- Pat Dunn (basketball) (1931–1975), American professional basketball player
- Pat Dunn (politician) (born 1950), male Canadian politician
- Pat Dunn (referee) (1933–1999), British football referee.

Patricia

- Patricia Dunn (actress) (1929–1990), American actress
- Patricia C. Dunn (1953–2011), Hewlett-Packard chair involved in pretexting scandal

Patrick

- Patrick Dunn (Indian Army general) (1911–1977), Indian Army General Officer
- Patrick Dunn (RAF officer) (1912–2004), British officer
- Patrick Dunn (bishop) (born 1950), Roman Catholic Bishop of the Diocese of Auckland, New Zealand
- Patrick Dunn (ice hockey) (born 1963), French ice hockey player

== See also ==
- Irina Dunn (born Patricia Irene Dunn 1948), Australian writer/politician
- Patrick Dun (1642–1713), Irish physician
