= Kathleen Dunn (disambiguation) =

Kathleen Dunn(e) may refer to:

- Kathleen S. Dunn, American certified dialect coach
- Kathleen Dunn (boxer) in 2005 Women's World Amateur Boxing Championships
- "The Picture of Kathleen Dunne", a song on the 1970 Oliver album Again

== See also ==
- Katy Dunn (disambiguation)
- Catherine Dunn (disambiguation) / Katherine Dunn
