= J. C. Dunn =

British medical officer during World War I and author

- Born: 24 February 1871; Churchill, New Zealand
- Died: 30 March 1955 (aged 84); Glasgow
- Education: University of Edinburgh
- Occupation: Physician
- Known for: Chronicling life in the trenches in WWI
- Notable work: "The War the Infantry Knew"

James Churchill Dunn (24 February 1871 – 30 March 1955) was a British medical officer during World War I, and author. In 1897, Dunn had gained an M.D. at Edinburgh University. He is known for his memoir The War the Infantry Knew, first published in 1938.

== Early life ==
Dunn was born in 1871 in Churchill, near Auckland in New Zealand, although his father's family were originally Scottish and came from Rutherglen in Lanarkshire. His parents were killed in the Te Kooti's War, a conflict between the Māori and European settlers, shortly after he was born and he was sent back to Scotland to be raised by his aunts. He was educated at Hamilton Academy, Glasgow Academy, and Clifton Bank School, St Andrews before going on to study medicine at Edinburgh University in 1888, He was awarded MB, CM in 1893, after some time also spent studying in Leipzig and Vienna. He later gained an M.D. at Edinburgh University, with his thesis on adenoids. He moved to London to practice medicine in a number of hospitals.

== Military career ==
Dunn enlisted in December 1899, volunteering for the Second Boer War as a trooper in the Montgomeryshire Yeomanry where he served for over a year, gaining a Distinguished Conduct Medal for bravery. Towards the end of the war he served briefly as a civil surgeon with the army in South Africa, before returning to his medical career in London. At the outbreak of World War I, aged forty three, Dunn again volunteered.

== World War I ==
Dunn, who had previously served in South Africa, was Regimental Medical Officer for the Royal Welch Fusiliers during World War I, and is mentioned in the memoirs of both Robert Graves and Siegfried Sassoon, who both also served with the same regiment. Dunn wrote of his official role that: "The first duty of a battalion medical officer in War is to discourage the evasion of duty ... not seldom against one's better feelings, sometimes to the temporary hurt of the individual, but justice to all other men as well as discipline demands it."

Dunn's memoir, which includes material that he solicited from others with whom he served, was originally published anonymously, in a private limited edition, and has been described as "a magnificent tour de force, the length of three ordinary books"

The work includes Captain C. I. "Buffalo Bill" Stockwell's account of the Christmas truce of 1914, which describes the resumption of hostilities as follows: "At 8.30 I fired three shots in the air and put up a flag with "Merry Christmas" on it, and I climbed on the parapet. He [the Germans] put up a sheet with "Thank you" on it, and the German Captain appeared on the parapet. We both bowed and saluted and got down into our respective trenches, and he fired two shots in the air, and the War was on again."

== Bibliography ==
- The War the Infantry Knew 1914–1919: A Chronicle of Service in France and Belgium
