= Francis Dunn (American football) =

American football player (1891–1975)

Personal information
- Born: April 15, 1891; Wilkes-Barre, Pennsylvania, U.S.
- Died: February 1975 (aged 83)

Career information
- College: Dickinson

Career history

Playing
- 1914: Canton Professionals
- 1915–1917: Canton Bulldogs

Coaching
- 1915, 1917: Dickinson

Awards and highlights
- Coaching record: 5–8–1

Francis Arthur "Mother" Dunn, (April 15, 1891 – February 1975) was an American football player as well as head football coach for at Dickinson College in Carlisle, Pennsylvania. While coaching at Dickinson he also played professional football for the Canton Bulldogs. After coaching he served as a corporate attorney in the steel industry until he retired in 1969

== Early life ==
Dunn was born and raised in Wilkes-Barre, Pennsylvania where attended the local schools. After high school, he chose to attend Dickinson College because the school had a law school. While at Dickinson he was member of many organizations including the Student Senate, Sigma Alpha Epsilon fraternity, as well as serving as president of the Athletic Association. A well rounded student he also sang with the Glee Club and sat on the editorial board of the college yearbook. He is considered one of greatest all-round athletes in the Dickinson's history earning two letters for basketball and four letters in football. During his senior year at Dickinson he married and had a daughter.

Dunn received the nickname "Mother" while traveling for his first year of college. It was giving to him by two upperclassman that happen to run into the incoming freshman at the Harrisburg, Pennsylvania train station. After finding out his last name, they started calling him "Mother," in reference to the Penn State All-American Center, William Thomas "Mother" Dunn.

After he graduated in 1914 he was a teacher and coach at Elkins Park High School in Cheltenham, Pennsylvania. The following year, he returned to Dickinson and entered the School of Law.

== College athlete ==
Dunn played fullback and halfback for the Dickinson College football team from 1910 to 1913. During his freshman year, he started every game and led the team in scoring with 25 points. The next year under new coach Simon F. Pauxtis, Dunn teamed up Hyman Goldstein in Dickinson backfield. The team finished with a record of 4–4. Dickinson started the season with a 17–0 loss to cross town rival Carlisle Indian Industrial School that featured Jim Thorpe and was coached by Pop Warner. Besides Carlisle, Dickinson faced off with National power University of Pennsylvania. Against Penn Dunn scored on a 35-yard interception but Dickinson lost by a score of 22–10. This was the most points that Dickinson had ever scored against Penn. In addition to their scheduled games, Dickinson and the Carlisle Indian Industrial School would play midweek scrimmages throughout the season. Dunn was elected captain of the 1912 team. The team started slow with losses to Penn and Carlisle but finished with a 4–4–1 record. The highlight of the season was a 0–0 tie against Swarthmore College on Thanksgiving Day. Dunn ran for 124 yards against a Swarthmore team that had beaten powers Penn, Navy and Lafayette. For the season Dunn led the team in scoring with 54 points on 9 touchdowns. In Dunn's last year playing for Dickinson, the Red and White finished with a record of 4–5 under new coach S. W. Harrington. During a game at Washington & Jefferson, Dunn play was so impressed the opponent's fans they gave him a standing ovation when he left the game in the fourth quarter. He finished the season with five games in which he had over 100 yards in offence. When he finished playing football Dunn had numerous Dickinson College records including most points in one game (30), most points in a season (84), most yards rushing in a season (114 carries for 959 yards), along with most of the other rushing and scoring records.

== College coach ==
To earn extra money while attending law school, Dunn took a part-time job as the head football coach for the Dickinson College. He held this position for the 1915 and 1917 seasons. The 1915 season did not do well for the Red and White. Due lack of talent and size the team finished with a record of 0–9–1. Seven of the eleven starters weighed less than 150 lbs. The team did not score in the first five-game and only scored 44 points total for the season. Dunn's team did manage a 0–0 tie with Western Maryland College in the first game of the season. For the 1916 season Forrest Craver, who had been serving as an advisor to the team, returned as head coach but hired Dunn as his field coach. He also hired J. Reap, a former Villanova football player, to assist with the line. In addition the team talent got a boost when Dunn convinced Gus Welch, considered one of the best players at Carlisle Indian Industrial School, to join the team. The team finished with a 4–3–2 record. One of the ties was against Swarthmore College, a team that had beaten national powers Penn and Columbia. Dickinson came from behind when Welsh tied the game with five seconds remaining. Dunn returned as head coach for the 1917 season after Craver and took a coaching position at the Tome School in Port Deposit, Maryland. Due to World War I, few members of the 1917 team returned, many choosing to join the military. Dunn coached the 1917 squad to the first undefeated and untied season Dickinson history. His overall coaching record at Dickinson was 5–8–1.

== Professional football player ==
At the same time Dunn was coaching the Dickinson College football team, he was also earning money during law school by playing professional football for the Canton Bulldogs under Jim Thorpe. Thorpe was tipped off by a teammate, Gus Welch, that Dunn was planning on playing for the Bulldogs' arch rival, the Massillon Tigers. Upon hearing the news, Thorpe hired Dunn to play for the Bulldogs. During the season Dunn would board a train on Saturday night so he could arrive for the game on Sunday. The team would run through plays in the morning and play in the afternoon. Dunn was able to pick up the plays easily because they were based on Pop Warner's offence that Warner used when he coached Thorpe at the Carlisle Indian Industrial School. Dunn was quite familiar since Carlisle was a cross town rival that he played against numerous times.

== After football ==
After the 1917 season Dunn followed Forrest Craver and took a temporary coaching position the Tome School. He held this job until his bar exam was reviewed. While teaching at the Tome School, a father of one of the students approached Dunn to take a legal position at the Cambria Steel Company in Johnstown, Pennsylvania. Dunn stayed with the company when it merged with Bethlehem Steel in 1923 and retired in 1969.
