= Andy Dunn =

American entrepreneur

- Born: February 20, 1979 (age 47)
- Occupation: Entrepreneur
- Known for: e-commerce, consumer internet, venture capital

Andy Dunn (born February 20, 1979) is an American entrepreneur and the co-founder of Bonobos Inc. Dunn was CEO for eleven years after co-founding Bonobos in 2007. In June 2017, Walmart announced it was purchasing Bonobos for $310 million in cash. Dunn joined Walmart after the purchase to lead the company's collection of direct-to-consumer brands, but left the company in January 2020. In April 2023, Walmart sold Bonobos to brand management firm WHP Global and fashion retailer Express Inc. for a combined $75 million, significantly below its original $310 million acquisition price. Following the sale, Dunn returned to Bonobos as an advisor.

== Career ==
=== Early years ===
Dunn was a consultant for Bain & Company in the US and Latin America following college. His time at Bain included consulting for catalog-based retailer Lands’ End, which was inspiration for the direct-to-consumer business and customer service model of Bonobos.

=== Bonobos ===
Started by Stanford graduate students Andy Dunn and Brian Spaly, Bonobos was created with the goal to provide men with better-fitting men's pants and a better shopping experience by building the brand on the internet. The company launched with pants that eliminate "Khaki Diaper Butt” and now offers a full line of menswear, including shirts and suits. Bonobos pioneered the internet-driven direct to consumer (DTC), or digitally native vertical brand (DNVB), retail model. The company launched online and was exclusive online for the first few years. It was the first American brand to use the web as the primary means of story-telling, service, commerce and distribution. The innovation led to the birth of an ecosystem, largely based in New York City, of DTC brands, including Warby Parker, Harry's, Glossier, Allbirds, and Away. Core to the idea of DTC brands is bundling product and service together to drive a higher NPS customer experience than legacy brick-and-mortar driven competition can deliver. To deliver the experience, Bonobos created a customer service team in 2008, the Ninjas, located at the Manhattan headquarters of the company. The Ninjas became a key part of the Bonobos experience in serving customers.

==== Guideshops ====
In 2011, the company invented a new retail model: apparel stores as fit-to-ship showrooms.

=== Red Swan ===
In 2011 Dunn cofounded the angel investment firm, Red Swan, which is focused on investing in consumer retail and consumer internet companies.

== Personal life ==
Dunn grew up in Chicago alongside his sister, Monica Royer, founder of Monica + Andy. His mom, Usha Ahuja Dunn, is an immigrant from India and his father, Charles Dunn, is the author of The Nurse and the Navigator, a World War II memoir of the wartime romance of his parents.

In 2017, Dunn married Manuela Zoninsein, a Brazilian immigrant and sustainability entrepreneur. Dunn and Zoninsein live in Chicago.

In 2022, Dunn went public with his battle with bipolar I disorder, describing it in his autobiography Burn Rate: Launching a Startup and Losing My Mind (Crown Currency) and in public talks, discussing how he was diagnosed with it in college after a manic episode, and how he hid it during his startup years, despite incidents including hospitalization at Bellevue Hospital in 2016, after which he was arrested for "stripping naked in the throes of mania and assaulting his then girlfriend and elderly mother-in-law". In 2023, he delivered a TED Talk titled "Lessons from Losing My Mind", further discussing his diagnosis and his efforts to destigmatize mental health in the workplace.

== Awards and recognition ==
- Crain's New York Business 40 under 40 list in 2013.
- Fortune's 40 Under 40 in 2018.
- Mover and Shaker of New York's startup scene, Entrepreneur magazine, 2013.
- Sexiest CEOs Alive, Business Insider.
- 100 People Transforming the World of Business, Business Insider.
