= Patricia Dunn (actress) =

American actress (1929–1990)

- Born: September 17, 1929; Los Angeles, California, U.S.
- Died: May 3, 1990 (aged 60); New York City, U.S.
- Years active: 1955–1960
- Spouse: Ronald J. Lehrman (m. 1956)

Patricia Joyce Dunn (September 17, 1929 – May 3, 1990) was an American actress and dancer, known for her roles in many Broadway plays.

Dunn was born in Los Angeles, California on September 17, 1929. She married Ronald J. Lehrman in New Jersey in 1956. She died from lung cancer at her home in Manhattan, New York, on May 3, 1990, at the age of 60. Lehrman died in February 2022, at the age of 89.

== Filmography ==
- The Wild Wild West - Ellen Collingwood "The Night of the Diva" (1969) TV Episode
- The Wackiest Ship in the Army - "The Sisters" (1965) TV Episode
- Kismet (1955) .... 2nd Princess of Ababu

== Sources ==
- "Patricia Dunn, 60, A Dancer in Films And on Broadway". The New York Times. May 5, 1990.
