= Herbert O. Dunn =

Herbert Omar Dunn
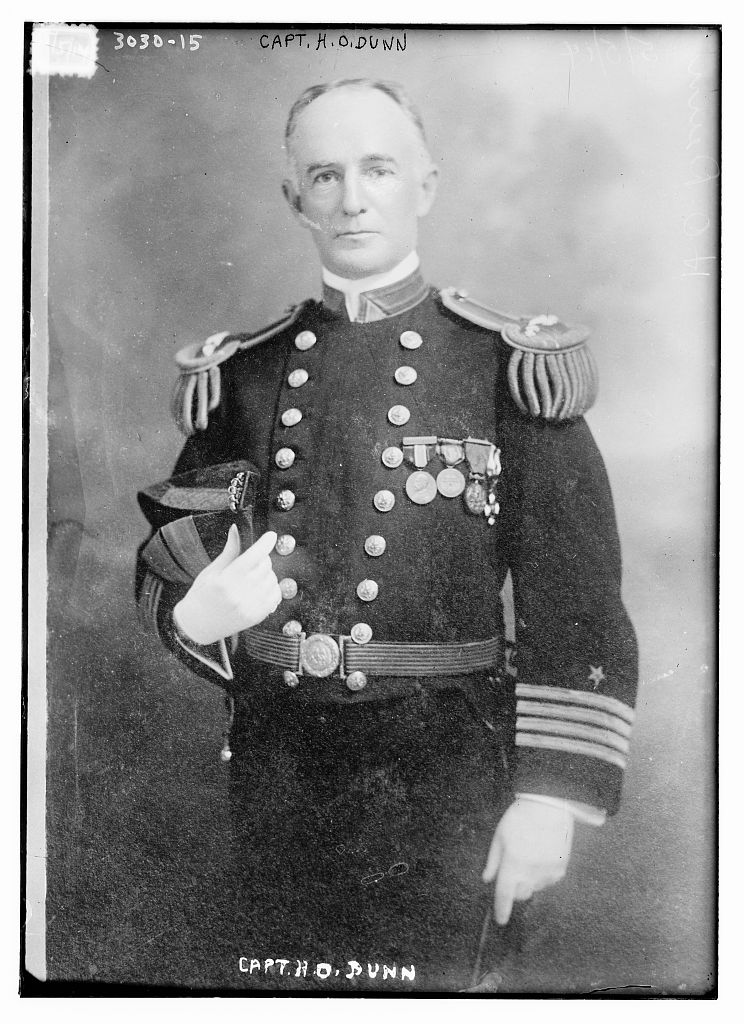
- Dunn in 1915
- Born: May 19, 1857; Westerly, Rhode Island, U.S.
- Died: March 6, 1939 (aged 81); Baltimore, Maryland, U.S.
- Military career
- Allegiance: United States
- Branch: United States Navy
- Service years: 1877–1921
- Rank: Rear Admiral

Herbert Omar Dunn (May 19, 1857 – March 6, 1939) was a Rear Admiral of the United States Navy.

== Early years ==
He was born on May 19, 1857, in Westerly, Rhode Island. In 1877, as a cadet, Dunn sailed on the sloop-of-war Constellation on a voyage to the South Atlantic.

== Career ==
Appointed ensign on 12 March 1881, Dunn was successively promoted to Lieutenant (junior grade) on 1 July 1887, lieutenant on 17 February 1893, and lieutenant commander on 1 July 1900.

By 1917, in the middle of the Great War, and now a vice-admiral, he was appointed the first commander of U.S. naval forces stationed at the U.S. Naval Base at Ponta Delgada, Azores. Dunn distinguished himself with the help he provided to the civil population when the great 1918 flu pandemic killed 2,000 people on the island.

In 1919 Dunn was in put in charge of an inquiry of homosexual activities among naval personnel at Newport, Rhode Island Navy bases.

== Inventions ==
As an inventor, in 1889 he designed and patented the Dunn Anchor. This new anchor had many distinct advantages over old style maritime stock anchors used at that time. It had great holding power due to its moveable shanks and could be applied in applications of 200 to 20,000 pounds. Accepted by the American Bureau of Shipping, the Dunn Anchor thus became the standard for ships worldwide to date. He also held the patents for several other marine appliances.

== Later years ==
Dunn retired in 1921 with the rank of Rear Admiral, and died in Baltimore, Maryland, on March 6, 1939.
