= Martin J. Dunn =

American lawyer and politician (1956–2020)

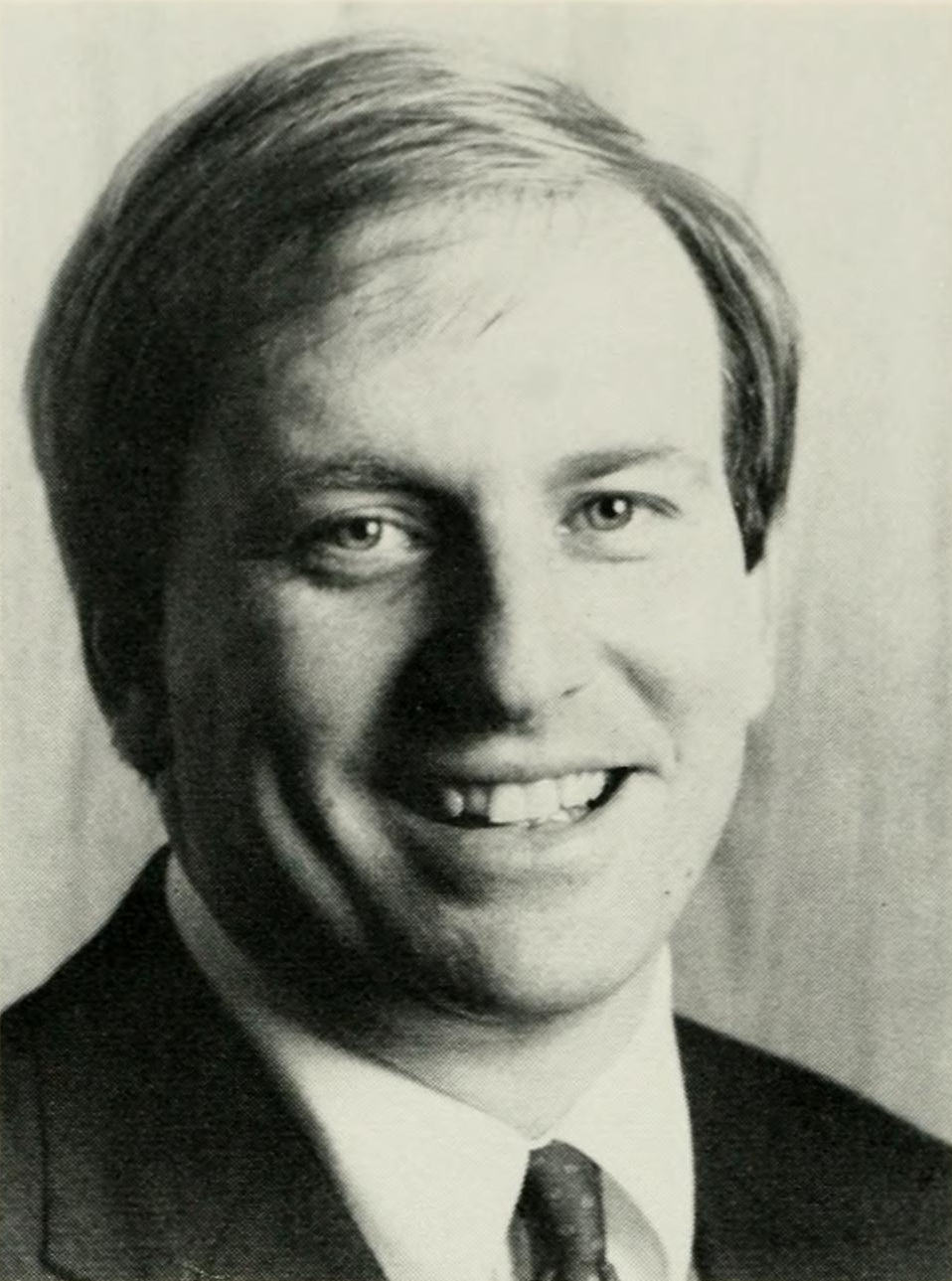

Member of the Massachusetts Senate from the Hampden and Hampshire District
- In office January 1991 – 1993
- Preceded by: John P. Burke
- Succeeded by: Shannon O'Brien

39th Mayor of Holyoke, Massachusetts
- In office 1987 – February 6, 1991
- Preceded by: Ernest E. Proulx
- Succeeded by: Joseph M. McGivern

Personal details
- Born: March 9, 1956 Holyoke, Massachusetts
- Died: September 11, 2020 (aged 64)
- Party: Democratic
- Relations: Maurice A. Donahue (uncle)
- Education: Columbia University; Suffolk University Law School

Martin John Dunn (March 9, 1956 – September 11, 2020) was an American lawyer and politician who served as Mayor of Holyoke, Massachusetts and in the Massachusetts Senate. Dunn served two terms as the Mayor of Holyoke before successfully seeking election to one term in the Massachusetts Senate before retiring after one term.

== Early life ==
Martin John Dunn was born in Holyoke, Massachusetts, on March 9, 1956. He graduated from high school in 1974, Mount Herman Academy in 1975, Columbia University in 1979, and Suffolk University Law School in 1982.

== Career ==
=== Local politics ===
Dunn served as an alderman in Holyoke, Massachusetts for two terms. In 1987, Dunn ran in the Holyoke mayoral election where he placed first out of three candidates in the primary, ahead of twelve-year incumbent Mayor Ernest E. Proulx. During the campaign both Dunn and Proulx were investigated by the Massachusetts Ethics Commission. Dunn defeated Proulx in the general election. He was reelected in 1989.

On February 2, 1988, the board of alderman voted eleven to four to not welcome Jane Fonda when she came to film Union Street which Dunn stated was a "disaster for the city". Dunn declined the NAACP's call for an independent review of police brutality charges in 1988. A Hispanic group withdrew its community service award for Dunn and disinvited him to a dinner after complaints of his support for the English-only movement.

=== Massachusetts Senate ===
In 1990, John P. Burke announced that he would not seek reelection to the Massachusetts Senate. Dunn, who had previously considered running for Hampden County district attorney, announced that he would run for the Democratic nomination to succeed Burke, which was the seat that was held by Dunn's uncle Maurice A. Donahue. He won the Democratic nomination and defeated Republican nominee Walter R. Bilski in the general election.

Dunn was appointed to serve on the Local affairs committee and as chairman of the School committee. He took office in the Massachusetts Senate in January 1991, and resigned from the Holyoke mayoralty on February 6, and was replaced by City Council President Joseph M. McGivern as acting mayor. Dunn announced that he would not seek reelection in 1992. In 1992, Dunn was named Legislator of the Year by the Massachusetts Teachers' Association.

== Later life ==
Dunn was given the staff attorney position in the Massachusetts Senate counsel's office in 1994. In 2015, he was given a Lifetime Achievement Award by the Holyoke Democratic Committee, and was given a medal from the St. Thomas More Society in 2018. Dunn died on September 11, 2020.

== Electoral history ==
1987 Holyoke, Massachusetts mayoral election
Primary election
Party	Candidate	Votes	%
Nonpartisan	Martin J. Dunn	3,810	50.22%
Nonpartisan	Ernest E. Proulx (incumbent)	2,613	34.44%
Nonpartisan	Charles F. Smith	1,164	15.34%
Total votes		7,587	100.00%
General election
Nonpartisan	Martin J. Dunn	8,091	58.41%
Nonpartisan	Ernest E. Proulx (incumbent)	5,760	41.59%
Total votes		13,851	100.00%

1989 Holyoke, Massachusetts mayoral election
Party	Candidate	Votes	%
Nonpartisan	Martin J. Dunn (incumbent)	8,673	80.91%
Nonpartisan	Edward O'Connor	2,046	19.09%
Total votes		10,719	100.00%

1990 Massachusetts Senate Hampden and Hampshire district election
Primary election
Party	Candidate	Votes	%
Democratic	Martin J. Dunn	9,907	49.60%
Democratic	Dolores Asselin	6,816	34.13%
Democratic	Kenneth R. Haar	1,775	8.89%
Democratic	Daniel M. Knapp	1,475	7.38%
Total votes		19,973	100.00%
General election
Democratic	Martin J. Dunn	32,529	66.36%
Republican	Walter R. Bilski	16,491	33.64%
Total votes		49,020	100.00%
