= Mick Dunn (footballer) =

Australian rules footballer

Personal information
- Full name: William Leslie Dunn
- Born: 28 February 1897; Adelaide, South Australia
- Died: 24 June 1966 (aged 69); Carlton, Victoria
- Original team: St Georges CYMS (CYMSFA)
- Position: Wing

Playing career^{1}
Years	Club	Games (Goals)
1916–19	Carlton	35 (5)
- ^{1} Playing statistics correct to the end of 1919.

William Leslie "Mick" Dunn (28 February 1897 – 24 June 1966) was an Australian rules footballer who played with Carlton in the Victorian Football League (VFL).
