= 1938–39 Southampton F.C. season =

English football club season

Southampton F.C.
1938–39 season
- Chairman: John Sarjantson
- Manager: Tom Parker
- Stadium: The Dell
- Second Division: 18th
- FA Cup: Third round
- Top goalscorer: League: Fred Briggs (14); All: Fred Briggs (14)
- Highest home attendance: 23,104 v Manchester City (12 November 1938)
- Lowest home attendance: 4,196 v Burnley (29 April 1939)
- Biggest win: 4–1 v Swansea Town (26 November 1938)
- Biggest defeat: 1–6 v Chesterfield (3 December 1938)
Home colours

The 1938–39 Southampton F.C. season was the club's 44th season of competitive football and 17th season in the Second Division of the Football League. The campaign was another disappointment for the Saints, who finished 19th in the league with 13 wins, nine draws and 20 losses – three positions lower than the previous season and four points above the relegation zone. Due to the uncertain international economic landscape, the club was unable to make many significant signings in the summer, with Welsh full-back Tom Emanuel their most expensive transfer. Several key figures left the South Coast club early in the season, including long-time players Charlie Sillett and Arthur Roberts, both of whom had made over 150 appearances; previous season's top scorer Harry Osman also departed in March 1939.

Southampton entered the 1938–39 FA Cup in the third round against Southern League club Chelmsford City. Despite competing two divisions above the Clarets, the Saints lost 1–4 to the non-league side, marking the fourth season in a row the Saints had failed to make it past their first game in the tournament. Alongside the Second Division and the FA Cup, Southampton played just one friendly match at the beginning of the 1938–39 season, against local rivals Portsmouth as part of the celebrations for the Football League's 50th jubilee. The match was won 4–2 by the First Division side, who overcame an early deficit to win the game at Fratton Park.

The club used 30 different players during the 1938–39 season and had nine different goalscorers. Their top scorer was new inside-forward Fred Briggs, who scored 14 goals in 36 league appearances. Fellow new arrival Reg Tomlinson scored 12 times during the Second Division campaign and once in the FA Cup, while Harry Osman scored nine league goals before his departure before the end of the season. 14 players were signed by the club during the campaign, with ten released and sold to other clubs, while one (John Summers) retired. The average attendance at The Dell during 1938–39 was 14,591. 23,104 was the highest attendance that was recently against relegated Manchester City on 12 November 1938; the lowest attendance was 4,196 against Burnley in the final home fixture of the campaign on 29 April 1939.

1938–39 was Southampton's last full season of competitive football until 1946. The 1939–40 Football League season was abandoned after just three games due to the outbreak of World War II, which lasted until 1945. At the time of the abandonment, Southampton were 17th in the table with only one win and two defeats. The FA Cup was hosted during 1945–46, with the Football League returning the following year. Tom Parker resigned as manager during the war, making it his last 1938–39 season with the club.

== Background and transfers ==
Due to the "uncertain international situation" ahead of the outbreak of World War II, Southampton's directors were reportedly "naturally unwilling to spend money on new players", meaning manager Tom Parker was unable to make significant signings ahead of the 1938–39 season. One of the first signings of the summer was 30-year-old forward Fred Briggs, who made the step up from Third Division South side Reading to the Saints on a free transfer; he went on to play in almost every game of the campaign, playing in all five forward positions and finishing as the club's top scorer. Other successful early signings included Harry Brophy from Arsenal, who scored in each of his first four games when played as a "makeshift centre-forward", before spending the rest of the season at half-back and full-back; Reg Tomlinson from Grimsby Town, who took over the centre-forward position and finished as the club's second highest goal scorer for the season; and Tom Emanuel from Swansea Town, who replaced the outgoing Charlie Sillett at left-back.

Several players left the Southampton squad in the summer of 1938. Wing-half Alf Day, inside-forward Jimmy Woolf and centre-forward Billy Dunn all left the club after arriving only a year earlier, having made a total of 38 appearances combined between them. Long-time squad members Charlie Sillett and Arthur Roberts, both of whom were approaching the latter years of their playing careers, also left in the summer – Sillett, who made just shy of 200 appearances for the Saints in all competitions, joined Guildford City in the Southern League; while Arthur Roberts, who had played over 150 games for the club, moved to league rivals Swansea Town. Winger John Summers, who had been a regular in 1936–37, his debut season with the club, was forced to retire from football due to an injury. Right-back Frank Perfect arrived from Tranmere Rovers in January 1939, while Harry Osman – the previous season's top goalscorer – departed Southampton in March for Millwall, who paid £3,500 for the winger.

Players transferred in

Name	Nationality	Pos.	Club	Date	Fee	Ref.
Fred Briggs	England	FW	(England) Reading	May 1938	Free	
Harry Brophy	England	HB	(England) Arsenal	May 1938	Unknown	
Tom Carnaby	England	HB	(England) Blyth Spartans	May 1938	Unknown	
Bill Stroud	England	HB	(England) Highbury Sports	May 1938	Free (Note: Bill Stroud initially joined on amateur terms in May 1938, before turning professional in February 1940.)	
Reg Tomlinson	England	FW	(England) Grimsby Town	May 1938	Unknown	
Oswald Bowden	England	FW	(England) Brighton & Hove Albion	June 1938	£150	
Bill Clarke	England	FW	(England) Exeter City	July 1938	Free	
Charlie Wilkinson	England	FB	(England) Sheffield United	July 1938	Unknown	
Doug McGibbon	England	FW	none (free agent)	August 1938	Free (Note: Doug McGibbon initially joined on amateur terms in August 1938, before turning professional that December.)	
Tom Emanuel	Wales	FB	(Wales) Swansea Town	September 1938	£2,200	
Bobby Veck	England	FW	none (free agent)	September 1938	Free (Note: Bobby Veck initially joined on amateur terms in September 1938, before turning professional in September 1945.)	
Eric Webber	England	HB	(England) Norwich City	September 1938	Free (Note: Eric Webber initially joined on amateur terms in September 1938, before turning professional in March 1939.)	
Norman Catlin	England	FW	(England) Ryde Sports	Late 1938	Free	
Frank Perfect	England	FB	(England) Tranmere Rovers	January 1939	Unknown	

Players transferred out

Name	Nationality	Pos.	Club	Date	Fee	Ref.
Henry Long	England	HB	(England) Newport (IOW)	Summer 1938	Unknown	
Alf Day	Wales	HB	(England) Tranmere Rovers	May 1938	Free	
Fred Smallwood	Wales	FW	(England) Reading	June 1938	Unknown	
Bill Kennedy	Scotland	HB	(Scotland) Hamilton Academical	July 1938	Unknown	
Wilf Mayer	England	FW	(England) Wellington Town	July 1938	Unknown	
Charlie Sillett	England	FB	(England) Guildford City	July 1938	Unknown	
Arthur Roberts	England	FB	(Wales) Swansea Town	August 1938	Free	
Jimmy Woolf	South Africa	FW	(England) Guildford City	August 1938	Unknown	
Billy Dunn	Scotland	FW	(Scotland) Raith Rovers	September 1938	£375	
Harry Osman	England	FW	(England) Millwall	March 1939	£3,500	

Players retired

Name	Nationality	Pos.	Date	Reason	Ref.
John Summers	England	FW	Summer 1938	Retired due to injury; joined the police force	

== The Second Division ==
Southampton faced a tough start to their 1938–39 Second Division campaign, with their first four fixtures against sides that had all finished in the top ten the previous season. The result was four consecutive defeats – 1–2 at home to Tottenham Hotspur, 1–2 at Burnley, 2–5 at Bury and 0–3 at Coventry City – which left the Saints at the bottom of the league table. New signing Harry Brophy scored in each of the first three games playing at centre-forward, before he played the rest of the season in various positions across the half-back line (and a handful of times at left full-back). After their first win, the Saints' form improved throughout the autumn, with the side picking up four wins and going on a four-game unbeaten run during October and November, including a 2–1 win over the recently relegated West Bromwich Albion, a hard-fought 4–3 win over Sheffield Wednesday, and the season's first away win over Millwall. Four defeats in five games between 12 November and 10 December (including a 1–6 thrashing at Chesterfield) ensured the team never made it above 16th place in the table before the new year. The side's one win in this period was their biggest of the season, 4–1 over fellow strugglers Swansea Town.

1939 began in much the same way, with Southampton picking up just one point from their first three games of the calendar year; during February, however, the club picked up another handful of wins (three from four matches, including 2–0 away against Nottingham Forest) to ensure they remained safe above the relegation zone. After the March departure of Harry Osman, who had scored nine of the club's league goals up to that point, the Saints began to struggle even more – they lost four of their seven fixtures in April, including 2–6 and 0–4 thrashings at the hands of Luton Town, a 0–3 defeat by eventual champions Blackburn Rovers, and a 2–0 loss at home to mid-table West Ham United. The team's final points came in the form of a close 2–1 win over Burnley, with the final game of the season seeing Plymouth Argyle return their early defeat with a 2–0 win over the South Coast side. Southampton finished the season in 18th position in the Second Division league table – three positions lower than the previous campaign – with 13 wins, nine draws and 20 losses (their highest number of losses in over ten years). They finished four points above Norwich City in 21st position, the first Third Division relegation place.

=== List of match results ===
27 August 1938 1	Southampton	1–2	Tottenham Hotspur	Southampton
	Brophy			Stadium: The Dell; Attendance: 22,653

30 August 1938 2	Burnley	2–1	Southampton	Burnley
			Brophy	Stadium: Turf Moor; Attendance: 13,334

3 September 1938 3	Bury	5–2	Southampton	Bury
			Brophy; Osman	Stadium: Gigg Lane; Attendance: 9,000

10 September 1938 4	Coventry City	3–0	Southampton	Coventry
				Stadium: Highfield Road; Attendance: 20,326

14 September 1938 5	Southampton	2–1	Plymouth Argyle	Southampton
	Osman			Stadium: The Dell; Attendance: 12,406

17 September 1938 6	Southampton	2–2	Nottingham Forest	Southampton
	Brophy; Hill			Stadium: The Dell; Attendance: 15,196

24 September 1938 7	Newcastle United	1–0	Southampton	Newcastle upon Tyne
				Stadium: St James' Park; Attendance: 35,000

1 October 1938 8	Southampton	2–1	West Bromwich Albion	Southampton
	Holt; Osman			Stadium: The Dell; Attendance: 16,423

8 October 1938 9	Norwich City	2–1	Southampton	Norwich
			Parkin	Stadium: Carrow Road; Attendance: 12,000

15 October 1938 10	Southampton	4–3	Sheffield Wednesday	Southampton
	Tomlinson; Briggs; Osman			Stadium: The Dell; Attendance: 17,123

22 October 1938 11	Fulham	1–1	Southampton	London
			Tomlinson	Stadium: Craven Cottage; Attendance: 20,000

29 October 1938 12	Southampton	3–1	Tranmere Rovers	Southampton
	Holt; Tomlinson; Briggs			Stadium: The Dell; Attendance: 16,341

5 November 1938 13	Millwall	0–1	Southampton	London
			Briggs	Stadium: The Den; Attendance: 35,000

12 November 1938 14	Southampton	1–2	Manchester City	Southampton
	Briggs			Stadium: The Dell; Attendance: 23,104

19 November 1938 15	Bradford	2–1	Southampton	Bradford
			Osman	Stadium: Park Avenue; Attendance: 10,000

26 November 1938 16	Southampton	4–1	Swansea Town	Southampton
	Briggs; Holt			Stadium: The Dell; Attendance: 14,178

3 December 1938 17	Chesterfield	6–1	Southampton	Chesterfield
			Briggs	Stadium: Recreation Ground; Attendance: 10,000

10 December 1938 18	Southampton	1–3	Blackburn Rovers	Southampton
	Tomlinson			Stadium: The Dell; Attendance: 15,649

17 December 1938 19	West Ham United	1–2	Southampton	London
			Briggs; Tomlinson	Stadium: Boleyn Ground; Attendance: 16,500

24 December 1938 20	Tottenham Hotspur	1–1	Southampton	London
			Tomlinson	Stadium: White Hart Lane; Attendance: 7,428

26 December 1938 21	Sheffield United	5–1	Southampton	Sheffield
			Briggs	Stadium: Bramall Lane; Attendance: 31,303

27 December 1938 22	Southampton	2–2	Sheffield United	Southampton
	Holt; Hill			Stadium: The Dell; Attendance: 19,489

31 December 1938 23	Southampton	0–0	Bury	Southampton
				Stadium: The Dell; Attendance: 13,844

14 January 1939 24	Southampton	0–2	Coventry City	Southampton
				Stadium: The Dell; Attendance: 11,578

28 January 1939 25	Southampton	0–0	Newcastle United	Southampton
				Stadium: The Dell; Attendance: 15,802

4 February 1939 26	West Bromwich Albion	2–0	Southampton	West Bromwich
				Stadium: The Hawthorns; Attendance: 20,000

8 February 1939 27	Nottingham Forest	0–2	Southampton	Nottingham
			Bevis; Tomlinson	Stadium: City Ground; Attendance: 3,000

11 February 1939 28	Southampton	3–1	Norwich City	Southampton
	Osman; Tomlinson			Stadium: The Dell; Attendance: 11,880

18 February 1939 29	Sheffield Wednesday	2–0	Southampton	Sheffield
				Stadium: Hillsborough Stadium; Attendance: 25,000

25 February 1939 30	Southampton	2–1	Fulham	Southampton
	Tomlinson; Briggs			Stadium: The Dell; Attendance: 12,512

4 March 1939 31	Tranmere Rovers	1–1	Southampton	Birkenhead
			Osman	Stadium: Prenton Park; Attendance: 7,000

11 March 1939 32	Southampton	1–1	Millwall	Southampton
	Bevis			Stadium: The Dell; Attendance: 14,411

18 March 1939 33	Manchester City	2–1	Southampton	Manchester
			Bates	Stadium: Maine Road; Attendance: 18,000

25 March 1939 34	Southampton	3–2	Bradford	Southampton
	Parkin; Bates; Briggs			Stadium: The Dell; Attendance: 9,679

1 April 1939 35	Swansea Town	1–3	Southampton	Swansea
			Bevis	Stadium: Vetch Field; Attendance: 8,000

7 April 1939 36	Luton Town	6–2	Southampton	Luton
			Bevis; Tomlinson	Stadium: Kenilworth Road; Attendance: 15,946

8 April 1939 37	Southampton	2–2	Chesterfield	Southampton
	Brophy; Briggs			Stadium: The Dell; Attendance: 14,904

10 April 1939 38	Southampton	0–4	Luton Town	Southampton
				Stadium: The Dell; Attendance: 15,114

15 April 1939 39	Blackburn Rovers	3–0	Southampton	Blackburn
				Stadium: Ewood Park; Attendance: 12,000

22 April 1939 40	Southampton	0–2	West Ham United	Southampton
				Stadium: The Dell; Attendance: 9,931

29 April 1939 41	Southampton	2–1	Burnley	Southampton
	Briggs; Tomlinson			Stadium: The Dell; Attendance: 4,196

6 May 1939 42	Plymouth Argyle	2–0	Southampton	Plymouth
				Stadium: Home Park; Attendance: 6,000

=== Final league table ===
Pos	Team	Pld	W	D	L	GF	GA	GAv	Pts
16	Bury	42	12	13	17	65	74	0.878	37
17	Bradford (Park Avenue)	42	12	11	19	61	82	0.744	35
18	Southampton	42	13	9	20	56	82	0.683	35
19	Swansea Town	42	11	12	19	50	83	0.602	34
20	Nottingham Forest	42	10	11	21	49	82	0.598	31

Source: RSSSF
Rules for classification: 1) Points; 2) Goal average; 3) Goals scored

=== Results by matchday ===
Round	1	2	3	4	5	6	7	8	9	10	11	12	13	14	15	16	17	18	19	20	21	22	23	24	25	26	27	28	29	30	31	32	33	34	35	36	37	38	39	40	41	42
Ground	H	A	A	A	H	H	A	H	A	H	A	H	A	H	A	H	A	H	A	A	A	H	H	H	H	A	A	H	A	H	A	H	A	H	A	A	H	H	A	H	H	A
Result	L	L	L	L	W	D	L	W	L	W	D	W	W	L	L	W	L	L	W	D	L	D	D	L	D	L	W	W	L	W	D	D	L	W	W	L	D	L	L	L	W	L
Position	16	16	20	22	21	20	21	19	21	18	20	16	16	17	18	18	18	18	18	18	18	17	17	18	18	18	18	17	18	18	18	18	18	17	16	17	16	16	16	18	17	18

Source: 11v11.com
A = Away; H = Home; W = Win; D = Draw; L = Loss

== FA Cup ==
Southampton entered the 1938–39 FA Cup in the third round against Southern League side Chelmsford City. Despite competing two divisions below the Saints, the Clarets defeated the Second Division side 4–1 in the first fixture of 1939, dominating most of the game to eliminate the South Coast club at the first hurdle for the fourth season in a row.

7 January 1939 Round 3	Chelmsford City	4–1	Southampton	Chelmsford
			Tomlinson	Stadium: New Writtle Street; Attendance: 10,741

== Other matches ==
Outside the league and the FA Cup, Southampton played just one additional game during the 1938–39 season, against local rivals Portsmouth (then struggling in the First Division) as part of the Football League's 50th jubilee celebrations. The visiting Saints opened the scoring through Billy Bevis in the first minute, before Pompey took control and equalised before half-time. The hosts began to dominate after the break, scoring three goals in quick succession to secure the win comfortably, before Reg Tomlinson scored a consolation late on for Southampton.

20 August 1938 Football League; Jubilee Match	Portsmouth	4–2	Southampton	Portsmouth
	Beattie; Groves; Easson; Worrall		Bevis 1'; Tomlinson	Stadium: Fratton Park; Attendance: 14,577

== Player details ==
Southampton used 30 different players during the 1938–39 season, nine of whom scored during the campaign. The team played in a 2–3–5 formation throughout, using two full-backs, three half-backs, two outside forwards, two inside forwards and a centre-forward. Goalkeeper Sam Warhurst, outside-right Billy Bevis and wing-half Harry Brophy featured in more games than any other Southampton player, with all three playing in 37 league games and the FA Cup tie. New inside-forward Fred Briggs finished as the season's top goalscorer with 14 goals in the league, followed by Reg Tomlinson with 12 league and one FA Cup goal.

=== Squad statistics ===
Name	Pos.	Nat.	League		FA Cup		Total	
Name	Pos.	Nat.	Apps.	Gls.	Apps.	Gls.	Apps.	Gls.
David Affleck	HB	(Scotland)	25	0	0	0	25	0
Ted Bates	FW	(England)	14	2	0	0	14	2
Billy Bevis	FW	(England)	37	6	1	0	38	6
Oswald Bowden	FW	(England)	2	0	0	0	2	0
Fred Briggs	FW	(England)	36	14	1	0	37	14
Harry Brophy	HB	(England)	37	5	1	0	38	5
Tom Carnaby	HB	(England)	14	0	1	0	15	0
Norman Chalk	HB	(England)	4	0	0	0	4	0
Bill Clarke	FW	(England)	2	0	0	0	2	0
Stan Cutting	HB	(England)	3	0	0	0	3	0
Tom Emanuel	FB	(Wales)	33	0	1	0	34	0
Phil Griggs	FW	(England)	1	0	0	0	1	0
Doug Henderson	FB	(England)	4	0	1	0	5	0
Frank Hill	HB/FW	(Scotland)	19	2	1	0	20	2
Arthur Holt	FW	(England)	29	4	1	0	30	4
Gerry Kelly	FW	(England)	5	0	0	0	5	0
Cyril King	HB	(England)	7	0	0	0	7	0
Doug McGibbon	FW	(England)	1	0	0	0	1	0
Ray Parkin	FW	(England)	29	2	1	0	30	2
Frank Perfect	FB	(England)	15	0	0	0	15	0
George Smith	HB	(England)	9	0	0	0	9	0
Len Stansbridge	GK	(England)	5	0	0	0	5	0
Reg Tomlinson	FW	(England)	36	12	1	1	37	13
Lawrence Wallace	FW	(England)	1	0	0	0	1	0
Sam Warhurst	GK	(England)	37	0	1	0	38	0
Eric Webber	HB	(England)	1	0	0	0	1	0
Charlie Wilkinson	FB	(England)	3	0	0	0	3	0
Fred Williams	FB	(England)	22	0	0	0	22	0
George Woodford	FB	(England)	1	0	0	0	1	0
Players with appearances who left before the end of the season
Harry Osman	FW	(England)	30	9	0	0	30	9

=== Most appearances ===
Rank	Name	Pos.	League		FA Cup		Total	
Rank	Name	Pos.	Apps.	%	Apps.	%	Apps.	%
1	Billy Bevis	FW	37	88.10	1	100.00	38	88.37
1	Harry Brophy	HB	37	88.10	1	100.00	38	88.37
1	Sam Warhurst	GK	37	88.10	1	100.00	38	88.37
4	Fred Briggs	FW	36	85.71	1	100.00	37	86.05
4	Reg Tomlinson	FW	36	85.71	1	100.00	37	86.05
6	Tom Emanuel	FB	33	78.57	1	100.00	34	79.07
7	Harry Osman	FW	30	71.43	0	0.00	30	69.77
7	Arthur Holt	FW	29	69.05	1	100.00	30	69.77
9	David Affleck	HB	25	59.52	0	0.00	25	58.14
10	Fred Williams	FB	22	52.38	0	0.00	22	51.16

=== Top goalscorers ===
Rank	Name	Pos.	League		FA Cup		Total	
Rank	Name	Pos.	Gls.	GPG	Gls.	GPG	Gls.	GPG
1	Fred Briggs	FW	14	0.39	0	0.00	14	0.38
2	Reg Tomlinson	FW	12	0.33	1	1.00	13	0.35
3	Harry Osman	FW	9	0.30	0	0.00	9	0.30
4	Billy Bevis	FW	6	0.16	0	0.00	6	0.16
5	Harry Brophy	HB	5	0.14	0	0.00	5	0.13
6	Arthur Holt	FW	4	0.14	0	0.00	4	0.13
7	Ted Bates	FW	2	0.14	0	0.00	2	0.14
7	Frank Hill	HB	2	0.11	0	0.00	2	0.10
7	Ray Parkin	FW	2	0.07	0	0.00	2	0.07

== Bibliography ==
- Chalk, Gary; Holley, Duncan (10 August 1987), A Complete Record of Southampton Football Club: 1885–1987, Derby, England: Breedon Books, ISBN 978-0907969228
- Chalk, Gary; Holley, Duncan; Bull, David (28 November 2013), All the Saints: A Complete Who's Who of Southampton FC, Bristol, England: Hagiology Publishing, ISBN 978-0992686406
- Juson, Dave; Aldworth, Clay; Bendel, Barry; Bull, David; Chalk, Gary (10 November 2004), Saints v Pompey: A History of Unrelenting Rivalry, Bristol, England: Hagiology Publishing, ISBN 978-0953447459
