= 1937–38 Southampton F.C. season =

English football club season

Southampton F.C.
1937–38 season
- Chairman: Sloane Stanley
- Manager: Tom Parker
- Stadium: The Dell
- Second Division: 15th
- FA Cup: Third round
- Top goalscorer: League: Harry Osman (22); All: Harry Osman (22)
- Highest home attendance: 25,561 v Aston Villa (4 September 1937)
- Lowest home attendance: 7,870 v Bradford (2 February 1938)
- Average home league attendance: 16,592
- Biggest win: 4–0 v Fulham (18 April 1938)
- Biggest defeat: 0–5 v Chesterfield (6 September 1937); 0–5 v Sheffield United (18 December 1937); 0–5 v Tottenham Hotspur (23 April 1938)
Home colours

The 1937–38 season was the 43rd season of competitive football by Southampton and the club's 16th in the Second Division of the Football League. Despite an appalling start which saw the side spend much of the first month of the campaign in the relegation zone, the Saints finished the season 15th in the league table – their highest position in four years. With manager Tom Parker entering his first full season as Southampton manager, the club made a large number of signings in the summer, including high-scoring winger Harry Osman and young inside-forward Ted Bates, who would go on to make over 200 appearances for the club and serve as manager for almost 20 years. Southampton finished the 1937–38 season with 15 wins, nine draws and 18 losses, six positions but just three points above the first relegation place.

Southampton entered the 1937–38 FA Cup in the third round against fellow Second Division strugglers Nottingham Forest. Despite enjoying the majority of chances on goal and going into half-time on level terms, the Saints lost 1–3 to Forest, exiting the tournament at the same stage as in all but one of the previous ten seasons. In addition to the Second Division and the FA Cup, Southampton played three friendly games during the 1937–38 season. The first, against a side put together by the Army Football Association (FA) in February, ended in a 7–2 win with Gerry Kelly scoring four and Ray Parkin scoring three. The second friendly saw Southampton beating a team representing the North Dorset FA 8–0 in April. The final friendly in May was against the newly crowned First Division champions Arsenal, which they lost 1–2.

The club used 29 different players during the 1937–38 season and had ten different goalscorers. Their top scorer was new outside-left Harry Osman, who scored 22 goals in 40 appearances in the Second Division. Fellow new arrival Ray Parkin scored eight league goals, while Arthur Holt was third on seven goals. 19 players were signed by the club during the campaign, with nine released and sold to other clubs. The average attendance at The Dell during 1937–38 was 16,592 – the highest of any season to date. The highest attendance was 25,561 against Aston Villa on 4 September 1937; the lowest was 7,870 against Bradford on 2 February 1938.

== Background and transfers ==
Having taken over as Southampton manager just a few months before the end of the last campaign, Tom Parker made numerous signings in the summer before the start of the 1937–38 season. Many of the new players came from his previous club Norwich City, chief among whom was inside-forward Ted Bates, who joined on his 19th birthday. Bates quickly established himself as a key player in the Saints side and would go on to make over 200 appearances for the club in a 16-year playing career, before holding numerous coaching roles and serving as manager for almost 20 years, taking them to the First Division for the first time in their history in 1966. Other imports from Norwich in the summer were right-half Stan Cutting, who had to wait until 1939–40 to make his only few first-team appearances; Alf Day, who became first choice at right-half upon joining, Jack Scott, who made just one appearance at centre-forward during his first year, and full-back George Woodford, who made a handful of appearances on both the right and the left.

Other signings in the summer included centre-half David Affleck, who joined from Clapton Orient for the biggest fee paid by the club since Johnny McIlwaine's £2,650 signing in 1930; centre-forward Billy Dunn, who was brought in from Brentford for £750 and scored a handful of goals in the first half of the season, goalkeeper Sam Warhurst, who joined from Bradford City and took over as first choice in his position; right winger Billy Bevis, who switched from local rivals Portsmouth, and had been first seen by Parker during a trial at Norwich; centre-forward Benny Gaughran, who was transferred for free from Scottish side Celtic; and left winger Harry Osman, who joined free from Plymouth Argyle and scored 22 goals in his debut season. The club also signed two players on amateur terms – centre-half Norman Chalk from Woolston Wednesday and inside-forward Phil Griggs from Spring Albion – neither of whom were able to break into the first team and failed to make an appearance during their first season at the club.

With so many new players joining the squad in the summer, inevitably several players also left the club. Forward Dick Neal, who had played consistently for the Saints since he joined halfway through the 1931–32 season and made 186 appearances, left in May to join Bristol City in the Third Division South. Also departing in May was Welsh half-back Billy Moore, who had made just one appearance in his single season with the Saints, and left to join First Division title challengers Wolverhampton Wanderers (although his stay was cut short due to injury). In June, Southampton lost two players: 1936–37 top scorer Jimmy Dunne, who returned to Ireland to serve as a player-coach at Shamrock Rovers, and fellow forward Fred Tully, who had played over 100 times for the Saints since 1933 before moving down to Clapton Orient in the Third Division South. Winger Laurie Fishlock, who had spent the whole of 1936–37 with the England cricket team, was sent out on trial to Fulham during the summer; he would later move to Gillingham in January 1938.

Southampton's transfer activity continued throughout the 1937–38 season. In September 1937, Parker paid recently-promoted Blackpool £2,200 for Frank Hill, who quickly took over as the side's first choice left-half. Inside-forward Ray Parkin also moved from the First Division, signing from Middlesbrough for a fee of £1,500. Also joining in September were Gerry Kelly from Port Vale, who played at centre-forward and outside-right, South African forward Jimmy Woolf, who made just one appearance at inside-right, and amateur right-back Fred Williams, who made his professional debut the next season. The final signing of the season was half-back George Smith, who signed on amateur terms. Before the end of 1937, Southampton accepted a £1,000 offer for Benny Gaughran – who had joined in the summer – from top-flight side Sunderland, as well as selling Ted Withers to Bristol Rovers in the division below. In January 1938, Billy Kingdon joined Yeovil & Petters United as player-manager. Goalkeeper Bert Scriven retired in April.

Players transferred in

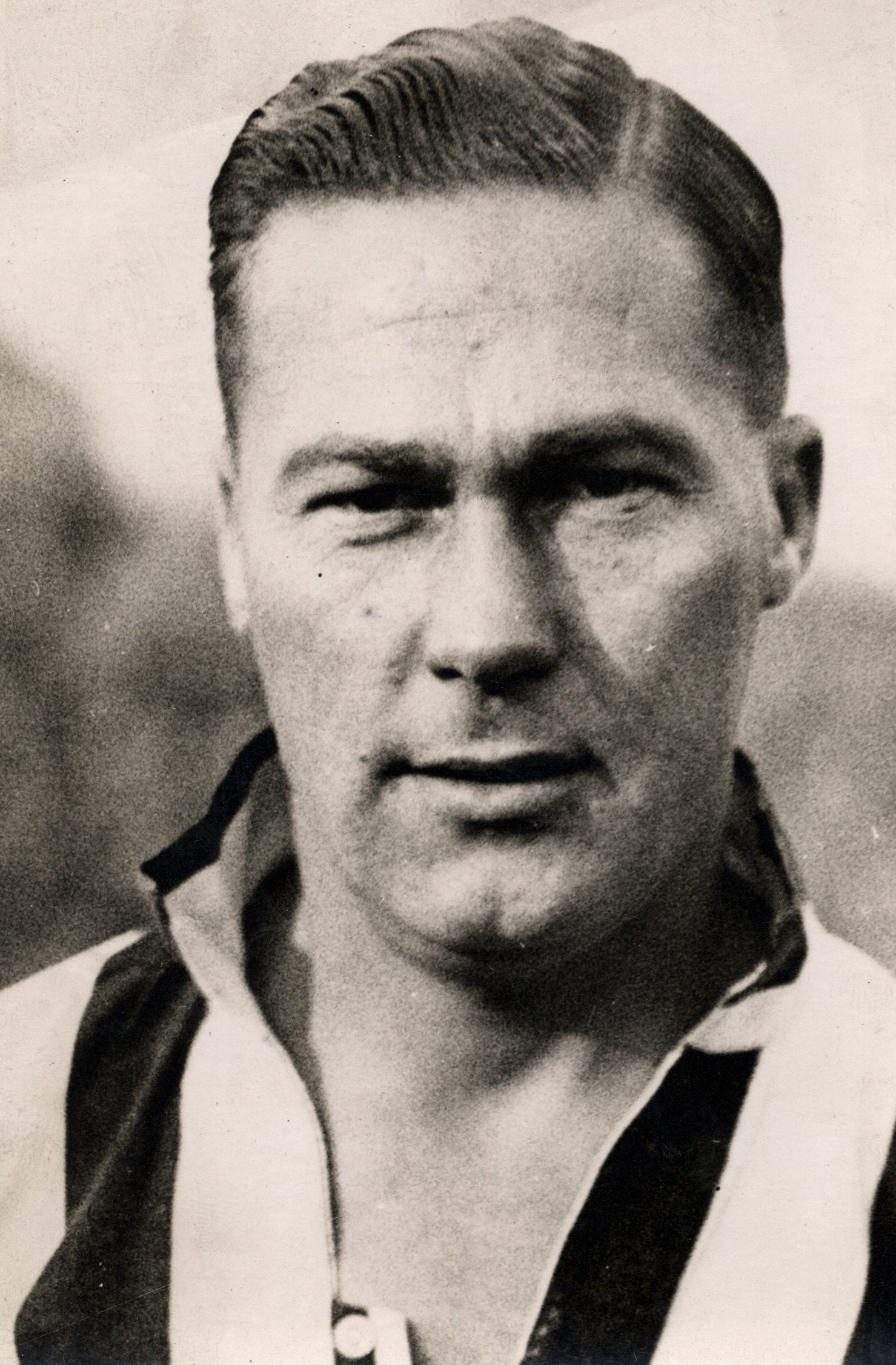
Ray Parkin was one of Southampton's big signings in the summer of 1937, joining from Middlesbrough for £1,500.

Name	Nationality	Pos.	Club	Date	Fee	Ref.
David Affleck	Scotland	HB	(England) Clapton Orient	May 1937	Unknown	
Ted Bates	England	FW	(England) Norwich City	May 1937	Free	
Norman Chalk	England	HB	(England) Woolston Wednesday	May 1937	Free (Note: Norman Chalk initially joined on amateur terms in May 1937, before turning professional that September.)	
Stan Cutting	England	HB	(England) Norwich City	May 1937	Free	
Alf Day	Wales	HB	(England) Norwich City	May 1937	Free	
Billy Dunn	Scotland	FW	(England) Brentford	May 1937	£750	
Jack Scott	England	FW	(England) Norwich City	May 1937	Unknown	
Sam Warhurst	England	GK	(England) Bradford City	May 1937	Unknown	
Billy Bevis	England	FW	(England) Portsmouth	June 1937	Unknown	
Benny Gaughran	Ireland	FW	(Scotland) Celtic	June 1937	Free	
Phil Griggs	England	FW	(England) Spring Albion	June 1937	Free (Note: Phil Griggs initially joined on amateur terms in June 1937, before turning professional in April 1939.)	
Harry Osman	England	FW	(England) Plymouth Argyle	June 1937	Free	
George Woodford	England	FB	(England) Norwich City	June 1937	Unknown	
Frank Hill	Scotland	HB	(England) Blackpool	September 1937	£2,200	
Gerry Kelly	England	FW	(England) Port Vale	September 1937	Unknown	
Ray Parkin	England	FW	(England) Middlesbrough	September 1937	£1,500	
Fred Williams	England	FB	(England) Hucknall Colts	September 1937	Free (Note: Fred Williams initially joined on amateur terms in September 1937, before turning professional in May 1938.)	
Jimmy Woolf	South Africa	FW	(South Africa) J.R.A.S. Johannesburg	September 1937	Unknown	
George Smith	England	FW	(England) Huddersfield Town	October 1937	Free (Note: George Smith initially joined on amateur terms in October 1937, before turning professional in July 1938.)	

Players transferred out

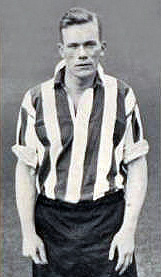
Jimmy Dunne, the Saints' top scorer in 1936–37, left the club to return to Ireland with Shamrock Rovers.

Name	Nationality	Pos.	Club	Date	Fee	Ref.
Billy Moore	Wales	HB	(England) Wolverhampton Wanderers	May 1937	Unknown	
Dick Neal	England	FW	(England) Bristol City	May 1937	Unknown	
Jimmy Dunne	Ireland	FW	(Republic of Ireland) Shamrock Rovers	June 1937	Unknown	
Fred Tully	England	FW	(England) Clapton Orient	June 1937	Unknown	
Benny Gaughran	Ireland	FW	(England) Sunderland	November 1937	£1,000	
Ted Withers	England	FW	(England) Bristol Rovers	December 1937	Unknown	
Laurie Fishlock	England	FW	(England) Gillingham	January 1938	Unknown	
Billy Kingdon	England	FW	(England) Yeovil & Petters United	January 1938	Unknown	

Players sent out on trial

Name	Nationality	Pos.	Club	Date	Ref.
Laurie Fishlock	England	FW	(England) Fulham	September 1937	

Players retired

Name	Nationality	Pos.	Date	Reason	Ref.
Bert Scriven	England	GK	April 1938	Unknown; later temporarily played for Salisbury City	

== Second Division ==
Southampton had an awful start to the 1937–38 league campaign, picking up just three points from draws in their first seven fixtures. The side lost 3–4 to Norwich City on the opening day of the season and did not score again in their next five games: 0–1 and 0–5 against Chesterfield, 0–0 against Aston Villa, 0–2 against Bradford, and 0–0 against Plymouth Argyle. After a 3–3 draw against West Ham United on 18 September which included the side's first goal in 524 minutes of play, the Saints found themselves in the relegation zone just one point above bottom-placed Fulham. A surprise 2–1 away win over recently-relegated Manchester United started off a drastic improvement in form, during which time they also picked up three consecutive victories over fellow strugglers Sheffield Wednesday (5–2), Stockport County (4–1) and Barnsley (2–0). This run saw the Saints move up as high as 15th in the Second Division league table. The club's form levelled out in the run-up to Christmas, as they picked up key wins over lower-ranked sides and continued to lose against those challenging for higher positions in the table; by the end of 1937, they sat 18th in the league with seven wins, five draws, and nine defeats.

January started with a 3–1 home win over Norwich City, followed by three straight defeats away to Aston Villa, Coventry City and West Ham United. Immediately after this, however, the team went on an unbeaten run of eight games, which included five victories (over Bradford, Blackburn Rovers, Barnsley, Luton Town and Newcastle United). The unexpected string of results saw the team move up from 18th all the way to 8th in the league table – the highest position they would reach all season. Following this, however, the Saints would pick up just two more wins and one draw from their last nine fixtures, which included a third 0–5 defeat of the campaign – this time against Tottenham Hotspur – as well as two 0–4 losses against Coventry City and Plymouth Argyle. The team scored just eight goals during this nine-game period. Southampton finished the season 15th in the Second Division league table with 15 wins, nine draws and 18 losses, three points above Barnsley in the first relegation spot.

=== List of match results ===
28 August 1937 1	Norwich City	4–3	Southampton	Norwich
			Dunn; Holt; Osman	Stadium: The Nest; Attendance: 23,172

1 September 1937 2	Southampton	0–1	Chesterfield	Southampton
				Stadium: The Dell; Attendance: 13,478

4 September 1937 3	Southampton	0–0	Aston Villa	Southampton
		Report		Stadium: The Dell; Attendance: 25,561

6 September 1937 4	Chesterfield	5–0	Southampton	Chesterfield
				Stadium: Saltergate; Attendance: 14,489

11 September 1937 5	Bradford	2–0	Southampton	Bradford
				Stadium: Park Avenue; Attendance: 10,845

15 September 1937 6	Southampton	0–0	Plymouth Argyle	Southampton
				Stadium: The Dell; Attendance: 11,845

18 September 1937 7	Southampton	3–3	West Ham United	Southampton
	Sillett; Parkin; Osman			Stadium: The Dell; Attendance: 19,478

25 September 1937 8	Manchester United	1–2	Southampton	Manchester
			Bevis; Holt	Stadium: Old Trafford; Attendance: 20,000

2 October 1937 9	Blackburn Rovers	4–0	Southampton	Blackburn
				Stadium: Ewood Park; Attendance: 14,000

9 October 1937 10	Southampton	5–2	Sheffield Wednesday	Southampton
	Holt; Osman; Gaughran			Stadium: The Dell; Attendance: 19,542

16 October 1937 11	Southampton	4–1	Stockport County	Southampton
	Gaughran; Parkin; Osman			Stadium: The Dell; Attendance: 20,039

23 October 1937 12	Barnsley	0–2	Southampton	Barnsley
			Osman	Stadium: Oakwell; Attendance: 10,000

30 October 1937 13	Southampton	3–6	Luton Town	Southampton
	Osman			Stadium: The Dell; Attendance: 20,544

6 November 1937 14	Newcastle United	3–0	Southampton	Newcastle upon Tyne
				Stadium: St James' Park; Attendance: 30,000

13 November 1937 15	Southampton	2–0	Nottingham Forest	Southampton
	Bevis			Stadium: The Dell; Attendance: 16,253

20 November 1937 16	Burnley	4–0	Southampton	Burnley
				Stadium: Turf Moor; Attendance: 10,000

27 November 1937 17	Southampton	4–1	Bury	Southampton
	Parkin; Gaughran; Holt; Osman			Stadium: The Dell; Attendance: 13,023

11 December 1937 18	Southampton	2–1	Tottenham Hotspur	Southampton
	Parkin			Stadium: The Dell; Attendance: 17,718

18 December 1937 19	Sheffield United	5–0	Southampton	Sheffield
				Stadium: Bramall Lane; Attendance: 20,000

25 December 1937 20	Southampton	1–1	Swansea Town	Southampton
	Osman			Stadium: The Dell; Attendance: 13,583

27 December 1937 21	Swansea Town	0–0	Southampton	Swansea
				Stadium: Vetch Field; Attendance: 20,685

1 January 1938 22	Southampton	3–1	Norwich City	Southampton
	Osman; Dunn			Stadium: The Dell; Attendance: 14,217

15 January 1938 23	Aston Villa	3–0	Southampton	Birmingham
		Report		Stadium: Villa Park; Attendance: 20,000

22 January 1938 24	Coventry City	2–0	Southampton	Coventry
				Stadium: Highfield Road; Attendance: 20,000

29 January 1938 25	West Ham United	3–1	Southampton	London
			Kelly	Stadium: Boleyn Ground; Attendance: 21,200

2 February 1938 26	Southampton	2–1	Bradford	Southampton
	Bevis; Osman			Stadium: The Dell; Attendance: 7,870

5 February 1938 27	Southampton	3–3	Manchester United	Southampton
	Osman; Holt			Stadium: The Dell; Attendance: 20,654

12 February 1938 28	Southampton	1–0	Blackburn Rovers	Southampton
	(o.g.)			Stadium: The Dell; Attendance: 16,293

19 February 1938 29	Sheffield Wednesday	0–0	Southampton	Sheffield
				Stadium: Hillsborough Stadium; Attendance: 15,000

26 February 1938 30	Stockport County	0–0	Southampton	Stockport
				Stadium: Edgeley Park; Attendance: 12,000

5 March 1938 31	Southampton	2–0	Barnsley	Southampton
	Kelly; Osman			Stadium: The Dell; Attendance: 14,769

12 March 1938 32	Luton Town	1–3	Southampton	Luton
			Osman; Parkin	Stadium: Kenilworth Road; Attendance: 14,428

19 March 1938 33	Southampton	1–0	Newcastle United	Southampton
	Parkin			Stadium: The Dell; Attendance: 20,204

26 March 1938 34	Nottingham Forest	2–1	Southampton	Nottingham
			Holt	Stadium: City Ground; Attendance: 8,000

2 April 1938 35	Southampton	0–0	Burnley	Southampton
				Stadium: The Dell; Attendance: 15,113

9 April 1938 36	Bury	2–1	Southampton	Bury
			Bevis	Stadium: Gigg Lane; Attendance: 8,000

15 April 1938 37	Fulham	1–0	Southampton	London
				Stadium: Craven Cottage; Attendance: 13,141

16 April 1938 38	Southampton	0–4	Coventry City	Southampton
				Stadium: The Dell; Attendance: 20,760

18 April 1938 39	Southampton	4–0	Fulham	Southampton
	Osman; Hill; Dunn			Stadium: The Dell; Attendance: 14,884

23 April 1938 40	Tottenham Hotspur	5–0	Southampton	London
				Stadium: White Hart Lane; Attendance: 15,000

30 April 1938 41	Southampton	2–1	Sheffield United	Southampton
	Bates; Parkin			Stadium: The Dell; Attendance: 12,611

7 May 1938 42	Plymouth Argyle	4–0	Southampton	Plymouth
				Stadium: Home Park; Attendance: 15,575

=== Final league table ===
Pos	Team	Pld	W	D	L	GF	GA	GAv	Pts
13	Plymouth Argyle	42	14	12	16	57	65	0.877	40
14	Norwich City	42	14	11	17	56	75	0.747	39
15	Southampton	42	15	9	18	55	77	0.714	39
16	Blackburn Rovers	42	14	10	18	71	80	0.888	38
17	Sheffield Wednesday	42	14	10	18	49	56	0.875	38

Source: RSSSF
Rules for classification: 1) Points; 2) Goal average; 3) Goals scored

=== Results by matchday ===
Round	1	2	3	4	5	6	7	8	9	10	11	12	13	14	15	16	17	18	19	20	21	22	23	24	25	26	27	28	29	30	31	32	33	34	35	36	37	38	39	40	41	42
Ground	A	H	H	A	A	H	H	A	A	H	H	A	H	A	H	A	H	H	A	H	A	H	A	A	A	H	H	H	A	A	H	A	H	A	H	A	A	H	H	A	H	A
Result	L	L	D	L	L	D	D	W	L	W	W	W	L	L	W	L	W	W	L	D	D	W	L	L	L	W	D	W	D	D	W	W	W	L	D	L	L	L	W	L	W	L
Position	14	18	21	22	22	21	21	20	21	16	16	15	16	18	17	18	17	17	18	18	18	15	17	17	17	16	18	11	12	14	13	10	8	9	10	11	13	13	13	13	13	15

Source: 11v11.com
A = Away; H = Home; W = Win; D = Draw; L = Loss

== FA Cup ==
Southampton entered the 1937–38 FA Cup in the third round, facing fellow Second Division club Nottingham Forest. Forest opened the scoring after 20 minutes, but the Saints "dominated much" of the game and equalised through Billy Dunn before half-time. The hosts went ahead almost immediately after the break, and despite Southampton almost equalising again, eventually scored a third goal just before full-time.

8 January 1938 Round 3	Nottingham Forest	3–1	Southampton	Nottingham
			Dunn	Stadium: City Ground; Attendance: 24,096

== Other matches ==
Outside the league and the FA Cup, Southampton played three friendly games during the 1937–38 season. The first was against a team put together by the Army Football Association, which the Saints won 7–2 thanks to goals from Gerry Kelly (four) and Ray Parkin (three). The second, against a North Dorset FA team, Southampton also won 8–0; Arthur Holt and Kelly scored one each, with five goals scored by an unknown player with the name "Lock" and one more scored by a player called "Wall". A final friendly saw Southampton hosting top-flight side Arsenal, who beat the hosts 2–1.

9 February 1938 Friendly	Army FA	2–7	Southampton
			Kelly; Parkin

27 April 1938 Friendly	North Dorset FA	0–8	Southampton
			Lock; Holt; Kelly; Wall

2 May 1938 Friendly	Southampton	1–2	Arsenal	Southampton
	Osman			Stadium: The Dell

== Player details ==
Southampton used 29 different players during the 1937–38 season, eight of whom scored during the campaign. The team played in a 2–3–5 formation throughout, using two full-backs, three half-backs, two outside forwards, two inside forwards and a centre-forward. Goalkeeper Sam Warhurst featured in more games than any other Southampton player, appearing in all but the final league game of the season against Plymouth Argyle; new outside-left Harry Osman played in all but two league fixtures, missing the Argyle game as well as a fixture against Tottenham Hotspur two weeks prior. Osman also finished as the season's top goalscorer with 22 goals in the league; he was followed by fellow new signing Ray Parkin with eight league goals, followed by Arthur Holt on seven.

=== Squad statistics ===
Name	Pos.	Nat.	League		FA Cup		Total	
Name	Pos.	Nat.	Apps.	Gls.	Apps.	Gls.	Apps.	Gls.
David Affleck	HB	(Scotland)	36	0	1	0	37	0
Ted Bates	FW	(England)	15	1	1	0	16	1
Billy Bevis	FW	(England)	31	5	1	0	32	5
Donovan Browning	FB	(England)	14	0	0	0	14	0
Norman Chalk	HB	(England)	1	0	0	0	1	0
Alf Day	HB	(Wales)	22	0	0	0	22	0
Billy Dunn	FW	(Scotland)	14	3	1	1	15	4
Sid Gueran	FW	(England)	2	0	0	0	2	0
Doug Henderson	FB	(England)	9	0	0	0	9	0
Frank Hill	HB	(Scotland)	32	1	1	0	33	1
Arthur Holt	FW	(England)	33	7	1	0	34	7
Gerry Kelly	FW	(England)	14	2	0	0	14	2
Bill Kennedy	HB	(Scotland)	10	0	0	0	10	0
Cyril King	HB	(England)	24	0	1	0	25	0
Henry Long	HB	(England)	3	0	0	0	3	0
Wilf Mayer	FW	(England)	5	0	0	0	5	0
Harry Osman	FW	(England)	40	22	1	0	41	22
Ray Parkin	FW	(England)	27	8	0	0	27	8
Arthur Roberts	FB	(England)	27	0	1	0	28	0
Jack Scott	FW	(England)	1	0	0	0	1	0
Charlie Sillett	FB	(England)	28	1	1	0	29	1
Fred Smallwood	FW	(Wales)	8	0	0	0	8	0
Len Stansbridge	GK	(England)	1	0	0	0	1	0
John Summers	FW	(England)	3	0	0	0	3	0
Sam Warhurst	GK	(England)	41	0	1	0	42	0
George Woodford	FB	(England)	6	0	0	0	6	0
Jimmy Woolf	FW	(South Africa)	1	0	0	0	1	0
Players with appearances who left before the end of the season
Benny Gaughran	FW	(Republic of Ireland)	7	4	0	0	7	4
Billy Kingdon	HB	(England)	7	0	0	0	7	0

=== Most appearances ===
Rank	Name	Pos.	League		FA Cup		Total	
Rank	Name	Pos.	Apps.	%	Apps.	%	Apps.	%
1	Sam Warhurst	GK	41	97.62	1	100.00	42	97.67
2	Harry Osman	FW	40	95.24	1	100.00	41	95.35
3	David Affleck	HB	36	85.71	1	100.00	37	86.05
4	Arthur Holt	FW	33	78.57	1	100.00	34	79.07
5	Frank Hill	HB	32	76.19	1	100.00	33	76.74
6	Billy Bevis	FW	31	73.81	1	100.00	32	74.42
7	Charlie Sillett	FB	28	66.67	1	100.00	29	67.44
8	Arthur Roberts	FB	27	64.29	1	100.00	28	65.12
9	Ray Parkin	FW	27	64.29	0	0.00	27	62.79
10	Cyril King	HB	24	57.14	1	100.00	25	58.14

=== Top goalscorers ===
Rank	Name	Pos.	League		FA Cup		Total	
Rank	Name	Pos.	Gls.	GPG	Gls.	GPG	Gls.	GPG
1	Harry Osman	FW	22	0.55	0	0.00	22	0.54
2	Ray Parkin	FW	8	0.30	0	0.00	8	0.30
3	Arthur Holt	FW	7	0.21	0	0.00	7	0.21
4	Billy Bevis	FW	5	0.16	0	0.00	5	0.16
5	Benny Gaughran	FW	4	0.57	0	0.00	4	0.57
5	Billy Dunn	FW	3	0.21	1	1.00	4	0.27
7	Gerry Kelly	FW	2	0.14	0	0.00	2	0.14
8	Ted Bates	FW	1	0.07	0	0.00	1	0.06
8	Charlie Sillett	FB	1	0.04	0	0.00	1	0.03
8	Frank Hill	HB	1	0.03	0	0.00	1	0.03

== Bibliography ==
- Chalk, Gary; Holley, Duncan (10 August 1987), A Complete Record of Southampton Football Club: 1885–1987, Derby, England: Breedon Books, ISBN 978-0907969228
- Chalk, Gary; Holley, Duncan; Bull, David (28 November 2013), All the Saints: A Complete Who's Who of Southampton FC, Bristol, England: Hagiology Publishing, ISBN 978-0992686406
- Juson, Dave; Aldworth, Clay; Bendel, Barry; Bull, David; Chalk, Gary (10 November 2004), Saints v Pompey: A History of Unrelenting Rivalry, Bristol, England: Hagiology Publishing, ISBN 978-0953447459
