= Jack Scott (footballer, born 1905) =

English soccer & rugby league player

Personal information
- Full name: John Redvers Scott
- Date of birth: 4 December 1905
- Place of birth: Grimethorpe, England
- Date of death: 9 March 1976 (aged 70)
- Place of death: Shirley, Southampton, England
- Height: 5 ft 10 in (1.78 m)
- Position: Half back

Youth career
- Pilkington Recreationals

Senior career*
Years	Team	Apps	(Gls)
1929–1931	Doncaster Rovers	29	(1)
1931–1937	Norwich City	33	(0)
1937–1940	Southampton (Player-coach)	1	(0)
Total		63	(1)
Rugby league career
Playing information
Club
Years	Team	Pld	T	G	FG	P
192?–29	Featherstone Rovers
- * Club domestic league appearances and goals

John Redvers Scott (4 December 1905 – 9 March 1976) was an English professional footballer who played as a half back for Doncaster Rovers, Norwich City and Southampton in the 1930s.

== Early career ==
Scott was born at Grimethorpe in South Yorkshire. Before taking up professional football, he played rugby league with Featherstone Rovers, and was a member of the Doncaster-based Pilkington Recreationals football team. He was also a part-time wrestler (he trained with Harold Angus, who competed in the Featherweight Freestyle division at the 1928 Summer Olympics, and won a silver medal at the 1930 British Empire Games, and later became the British Welterweight Champion) and boxer (he sparred with George Slack, a heavyweight boxer from Doncaster).

== Football career ==
In March 1929, Scott joined Doncaster Rovers of the Football League Third Division North as an amateur, becoming a professional a few months later. After two years with Doncaster, he moved to Norwich City, making his début in a 2–0 defeat at Swindon Town on 23 January 1932. He remained with the Carrow Road club for six years in which he made a total of 45 appearances as a half back.

In May 1937, he was released and moved to the south coast to re-join his former manager, Tom Parker. At The Dell, he joined the Saints' training staff and took charge of the club's nursery side. Described as "tough as old nails" and "strong as an ox", he kept himself fit and was a regular member of the club's "A" team which played in the Hampshire League. On 27 December 1937, he was called into the first team to play at centre forward as Ray Parkin, Benny Gaughran and Billy Dunn were all unavailable with injuries. The match at Swansea Town ended in a goalless draw.

Scott remained with the Saints during the Second World War, making occasional appearances in the wartime leagues.

== Personal Life ==
During the war, he was employed by the Folland Aircraft factory at Hamble. After the war, he was employed by the Southampton Corporation in the city library. Scott's younger brother, Harry, was also a professional footballer with Bournemouth & Boscombe Athletic and Swindon Town.
