= Harry Brophy =

English footballer and manager

Personal information
- Full name: Henry Frederick Brophy
- Date of birth: 22 October 1916
- Place of birth: Leicester, England
- Date of death: 6 November 1996 (aged 80)
- Place of death: Bedford, England
- Position: Half-back

Youth career
- 1933–1936: Arsenal
- 1934–1935: →Canterbury Waverley (loan)
- 1935–1936: →Margate (loan)

Senior career*
Years	Team	Apps	(Gls)
1936–1938	Arsenal	0	(0)
1938–1939	Southampton	37	(5)
1949–1952	Corinthian F.C. (Brisbane)		

Managerial career
- 1954–1955: Australia
- 1957–1959: Mauritius
- 1962: Sydney Prague
- 1963: Sydney Croatia
- * Club domestic league appearances and goals

Henry Frederick Brophy (22 October 1916 – 6 November 1996) was an English professional footballer who played for Southampton in the years immediately before World War II. After the war, he emigrated to Australia where he coached and captained the national football team, including acting as team manager for two games in 1954 and 1955.

== Early career ==
Brophy was born in Leicester, but moved to North London as a child. He captained Islington schoolboys to the English Schools Shield in 1931 (aged 14) and his maturity was soon spotted by Arsenal who signed him up as a trainee in 1933. He never appeared for Arsenal's first team and was sent out on loan, firstly to Canterbury Waverley of the Kent League and then to Margate (Arsenal's nursery team) for the 1935–36 season. He signed professional papers for Arsenal in May 1936, and was then sent out on loan again, this time to Brighton & Hove Albion. He broke a leg when playing in a reserve match for Brighton against Reading (in a tackle with Fred Briggs whom he was later to partner in Southampton's forward line). He returned to Highbury but failed to break into the first team.

== Southampton ==
Whilst with the "Gunners" his potential had been spotted by Tom Parker and in May 1938, now the Saints manager, Parker signed him for Southampton. Although Brophy was normally a half back, he was drafted in as centre forward for the first three games of the 1938–39 season in the absence of Reg Tomlinson. Brophy scored in each of the first three games of the season before injury sidelined him for two games. All three of the games ended as defeats, setting the tone for the rest of the season. He came back into the side, this time at left half and scored again. After that flurry of goals, he only scored once more.

The outbreak of war then brought Brophy's playing career to a premature end. He initially joined the police before joining the Merchant Navy and served on the hospital ship "St Andrew" during the Dunkirk evacuation in 1940. During the war he guested for several clubs, including Huddersfield Town, Fulham and Crystal Palace and Clapton Orient.

== Coaching in Australia ==
In 1949 he emigrated to Queensland and joined Corinthian F.C. in Brisbane. He graduated to coaching for Australia and took charge of the team in 1954 and 1955.
