= Frank Perfect =

English footballer

Personal information
- Full name: Frank Thomas Perfect
- Date of birth: 9 March 1915
- Place of birth: Gorleston, England
- Date of death: 17 July 1977 (aged 62)
- Place of death: Guiseley, England
- Height: 5 ft 9 in (1.75 m)
- Position: Full back

Youth career
- Stradbroke Road
- Great Yarmouth Town boys
- Gorleston

Senior career*
| Years | Team | Apps | (Gls) |
| 1933–1936 | Norwich City | 1 | (0) |
| 1936 | Mansfield Town | 13 | (0) |
| 1936–1938 | Wolverhampton Wanderers | 0 | (0) |
| 1938–1939 | Tranmere Rovers | 13 | (0) |
| 1939 | Southampton | 15 | (0) |
- * Club domestic league appearances and goals

Frank Thomas Perfect (9 March 1915 – 17 July 1977) was an English professional footballer who played as a full back for various clubs, including Mansfield Town, Tranmere Rovers and Southampton in the 1930s.

== Football career ==
Perfect was born in Gorleston, near Great Yarmouth, Norfolk. He played his youth football for Stradbroke Road (Lowestoft), Great Yarmouth Town boys and Gorleston, as well as representing Norfolk county in 1932.

In March 1933, aged 18, he joined Norwich City as an amateur. Although he remained with the Carrow Road club for three years he only made one first-team appearance, against Southend United in 1934. He left Norwich in June 1936 and spent six months with Mansfield Town in the Third Division North before moving on to Wolverhampton Wanderers of the First Division. He failed to make a first-team appearance for Wolves, and in February 1938 he moved back to the Third Division North, with Tranmere Rovers.

In January 1939, Second Division Southampton's manager Tom Parker was angry after the Saints' humiliating FA Cup defeat to non-league Chelmsford City and was anxious to recruit new players to strengthen the defence. Parker had been manager at Norwich City during Perfect's time there so paid £2,500 to bring him to The Dell. He made his debut in a 0–0 draw with Newcastle United on 28 January, taking the place of Fred Williams at right-back. Described as a "bulky full-back" who "did all that was asked of him", Perfect had a talent for making good long through-passes.

Perfect made 15 appearances in 1938–39 and two matches at the start of the following season, before league football was suspended during the Second World War.
