= Tom Carnaby =

English footballer

Personal information
- Full name: Thomas Easton Carnaby
- Date of birth: 25 December 1913
- Place of birth: Newsham, Northumberland, England
- Date of death: July qtr. 1971 (aged 57)
- Place of death: Hendon, England
- Height: 6 ft 0 in (1.83 m)
- Position: Half back

Youth career
- New Delaval United

Senior career*
| Years | Team | Apps | (Gls) |
| 1933–1938 | Blyth Spartans | | |
| 1938–1939 | Southampton | 14 | (0) |
| 1947–19?? | Andover | | |
- * Club domestic league appearances and goals

Thomas Easton Carnaby (25 December 1913 – 1971) was an English professional footballer who played as a half back for Southampton in the final season before the Second World War.

== Football career ==
Carnaby was born in Newsham, near Blyth, Northumberland where he worked as a coal-miner at New Delaval Colliery, and played for the pit team, before joining Blyth Spartans in 1933. He helped Blyth Spartans win the North Eastern League title in 1935–36.

In May 1938, he moved to the south coast to join Southampton of the Football League Second Division. Described as "a brawny centre-half", Carnaby was used as cover for David Affleck. Carnaby made his first-team debut when he replaced Affleck for the match at Tottenham Hotspur on Christmas Eve, 1938 (the day before his 25th birthday). Carnaby retained his place at centre-half for the next five matches, including a 4–1 defeat at non-league Chelmsford City in the FA Cup. After Affleck's return, Carnaby was switched to right-half for four matches, replacing Ray Parkin. His final run of matches came when he replaced Norman Chalk at centre-half for the last four matches of the season.

== Later career ==
Following the outbreak of the Second World War, Carnaby was released by the Saints and joined the Southampton police, playing for their War Reserve side. After the war, he joined Andover for a short time.
