= Jimmy Woolf =

South African soccer player

Personal information
- Full name: Levi James Woolf
- Date of birth: 27 January 1916
- Place of birth: Johannesburg, South Africa
- Date of death: 27 May 2003 (aged 87)
- Place of death: Durban, South Africa
- Height: 5 ft 8 in (1.73 m)
- Position: Inside right

Youth career
- J.R.A.S. Johannesburg

Senior career*
Years	Team	Apps	(Gls)
1937–1938	Southampton	1	(0)
1938–1939	Guildford City		
- * Club domestic league appearances and goals

Levi James Woolf (27 January 1916 – 27 January 2003) was a South African professional footballer who played one match in the Football League for Southampton in 1937.

== Football career ==
Woolf was born in Johannesburg, South Africa but was determined to become a professional footballer in England. In September 1937, he travelled to Britain on board the Union-Castle liner, Balmoral Castle; a steward on the liner heard of Woolf's intentions and sent a telegram to the manager of Southampton Football Club, Tom Parker. Parker arranged for Woolf to be met after he disembarked at Southampton Docks and he was given a trial.

He was signed by the club after the trial match and was soon playing regularly at inside right in the reserves. On 11 December 1937, he made his first-team debut when he took the place of Ray Parkin at inside-right for the Second Division match against Tottenham Hotspur, with Parkin moving to centre-forward in place of Benny Gaughran who had recently been sold to Sunderland. Although the match was won 2–1, with Parkin scoring both Saints' goals, Woolf was not a great success and he returned to the reserves.

In the summer of 1938, he joined Guildford City of the Southern League. At the end of his first season at Guildford, they finished as Southern League runners-up.

== Later career ==
During the Second World War, Woolf enlisted in the Army and served in Burma. After the war, he returned to South Africa.
