= Charlie Wilkinson (footballer) =

English footballer

Personal information
- Full name: Charles Edward Wilkinson
- Date of birth: 7 May 1907
- Place of birth: Medomsley, England
- Date of death: October qtr. 1975 (aged 68)
- Place of death: Medomsley, England
- Height: 5 ft 10 in (1.78 m)
- Position: Full back

Youth career
- Wallsend
- Consett

Senior career*
Years	Team	Apps	(Gls)
1928–1933	Leeds United	3	(0)
1933–1938	Sheffield United	120	(0)
1938–1939	Southampton	3	(0)
1939	Bournemouth	1	(0)
Total		127	(0)
- * Club domestic league appearances and goals

Charles Edward Wilkinson (7 May 1907 – 1975) was an English professional footballer who played as a full back for Leeds United, Sheffield United and Southampton in the 1930s. He was a member of Sheffield United's FA Cup team that reached the final in 1936, where they were defeated by Arsenal.

== Football career ==
Wilkinson was born in Medomsley, near Consett in County Durham. After playing his early football for local sides, Wallsend and Consett, he joined Leeds United of the Football League First Division in September 1928.

Although he remained with the Elland Road club for five years, he only made three first-team appearances before he moved to fellow First Division club Sheffield United in October 1933, for a fee of £2,000. A bout of influenza caused Wilkinson to miss much of his first season with the Blades, who were relegated to the Second Division. On his recovery, he soon became a regular player at left back, staying with the Bramall Lane club for five years, making 133 first-team appearances.

In 1936, Wilkinson helped Sheffield United reach the FA Cup semi-finals, where they met fellow Second Division side Fulham. Wilkinson was injured and unavailable to play in the semi-final, with Albert Cox taking his place as Fulham were defeated 2–1. Wilkinson recovered from his injury in time for the final and manager, Teddy Davison, "opted for (Wilkinson's) age and experience" over Cox. The final, against Arsenal of the First Division, was a fairly even contest which "produced few quality moments" and was won by the only goal of the match from Ted Drake.

In the summer of 1938, Wilkinson left Sheffield to join fellow Second Division club Southampton. He played the first two matches of the 1938–39 season, both 2–1 defeats, but sustained a serious leg injury in the second match at Burnley. The injury required the removal of a cartilage and by the time he had recovered, new signing Tom Emanuel had become established at left back. Wilkinson only managed one further appearance before he left at the end of the season to join Bournemouth as player-coach.

== Honours ==
Sheffield United

- FA Cup runner-up: 1935–36
