= Albert Cox (footballer) =

English footballer

Personal information
- Full name: Albert Edward Harrison Cox
- Date of birth: 24 June 1917
- Place of birth: Treeton, Rotherham, England
- Date of death: April 2003 (aged 85)
- Place of death: Rotherham
- Height: 5 ft 9 in (1.75 m)
- Position: Left-back

Youth career
- Woodhouse Mill United

Senior career*
Years	Team	Apps	(Gls)
1936–1952	Sheffield United	267	(5)
1952–1953	Halifax Town	53	(1)
Total		320	(6)
- * Club domestic league appearances and goals

Albert Edward Harrison Cox (24 June 1917 in Treeton, Rotherham – April 2003) was a footballer who played as a left-back for Sheffield United and Halifax Town.

== Career ==
Cox joined Sheffield United from amateur side Woodhouse Mill United F.C., and quickly settled into the first team at Bramall Lane. He made his league debut against Blackpool at Bramall Lane on 20 February 1936, in a 1–0 win. In 1936, Sheffield United reached the FA Cup semi-finals, where they met fellow Second Division side Fulham. Regular left-back, Charlie Wilkinson was injured and unavailable to play in the semi-final, so the inexperienced Cox took his place. Cox remained "cool in defence" as Fulham were defeated 2–1. Wilkinson recovered from his injury in time for the final and manager, Teddy Davison, "opted for (Wilkinson's) age and experience" over Cox.

Cox was often described as a 'bungle of energy' on the field of play. His partner at full-back in the late 1930s was Harry Hooper.

Although World War II interrupted his career, Cox played on for several seasons after hostilities had ended, and became one of the most consistent left-backs in the Football League. In total he made 267 league appearances for the Blades with 5 goals.

He was transferred to Halifax Town during the 1952 close season.
