= Benny Gaughran (Gaelic footballer) =

Solicitor and Gaelic footballer

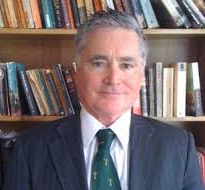
- Picture of Benny (2012)

Personal information
- Native name: Brían Mac Éachráin (Irish)
- Nickname: Benny
- Born: 16 July 1945 (age 81) Dublin, Ireland
- Occupation: Solicitor
- Height: 5 ft 9 in (175 cm)

Sport
- Sport: Gaelic football
- Position: Midfield
Clubs
- Years: Club
- 1960s 1960s 1970s–1990s 1990s: Clan na Gael; UCD (Dublin); Civil Service (Dublin); St Sylvester's (Dublin)
Club titles
- Dublin titles: 3
- Leinster titles: 1
- All-Ireland Titles: 1
College
- Years: College
- 1960s: UCD (Dublin)
College titles
- Sigerson titles: 1967–68 (Captain)
Inter-county
- Years: County
- 1960s 1960s–80s 1990s: Louth (Minor Team); Louth (Senior Team); Dublin (Over 40s)
Inter-county titles
- NFL: 1
Club management
- Years: Club
- 1990s: St Sylvesters (Dublin)

Bernard Laurence Gaughran (born 16 July 1945), better known as Benny Gaughran is a solicitor and Gaelic footballer. He played Gaelic football at a senior level in four different decades starting in the 1960s with Clan na Gael (Louth), UCD (Dublin), Civil Service (Dublin) and St Sylvester's (Dublin) GAA clubs and was a member of the Louth Minor & Senior inter-county teams from the 1960s until the 1980s and the Dublin Over 40s team in the 1990s. He received several All Stars nominations, and won an All-Ireland Club medal with UCD (Dublin), three Dublin Championship medals, a National League medal, a Railway Cup medal, a Sigerson's medal (as captain) and many other honours. He was also selected on numerous occasions for the combined universities’ teams and the Leinster team.

His father, also called Benny Gaughran, was a professional soccer player during the 1930s and played for Bohemians, Celtic, Southampton, Sunderland, Rochdale and Dundalk.

== Playing career ==
=== Early life ===
Gaughran did not start playing Gaelic football until the age of 15. He was playing soccer having been inspired by his father Benny Gaughran who was a professional soccer player. Benny played soccer at minor level, scoring four goals and sometimes more in games. Even before he became a Louth Minor, he trained assiduously and strengthened his body on a daily basis with a nightly regime of press-ups and situps.

=== College, Combined Universities & Club career ===
==== Clan na Gael (Louth) ====
He played for Dundalk's Clan na Gael side in the 1960s and lost his first senior championship final playing against Newtown Blues in 1964.

==== UCD ====
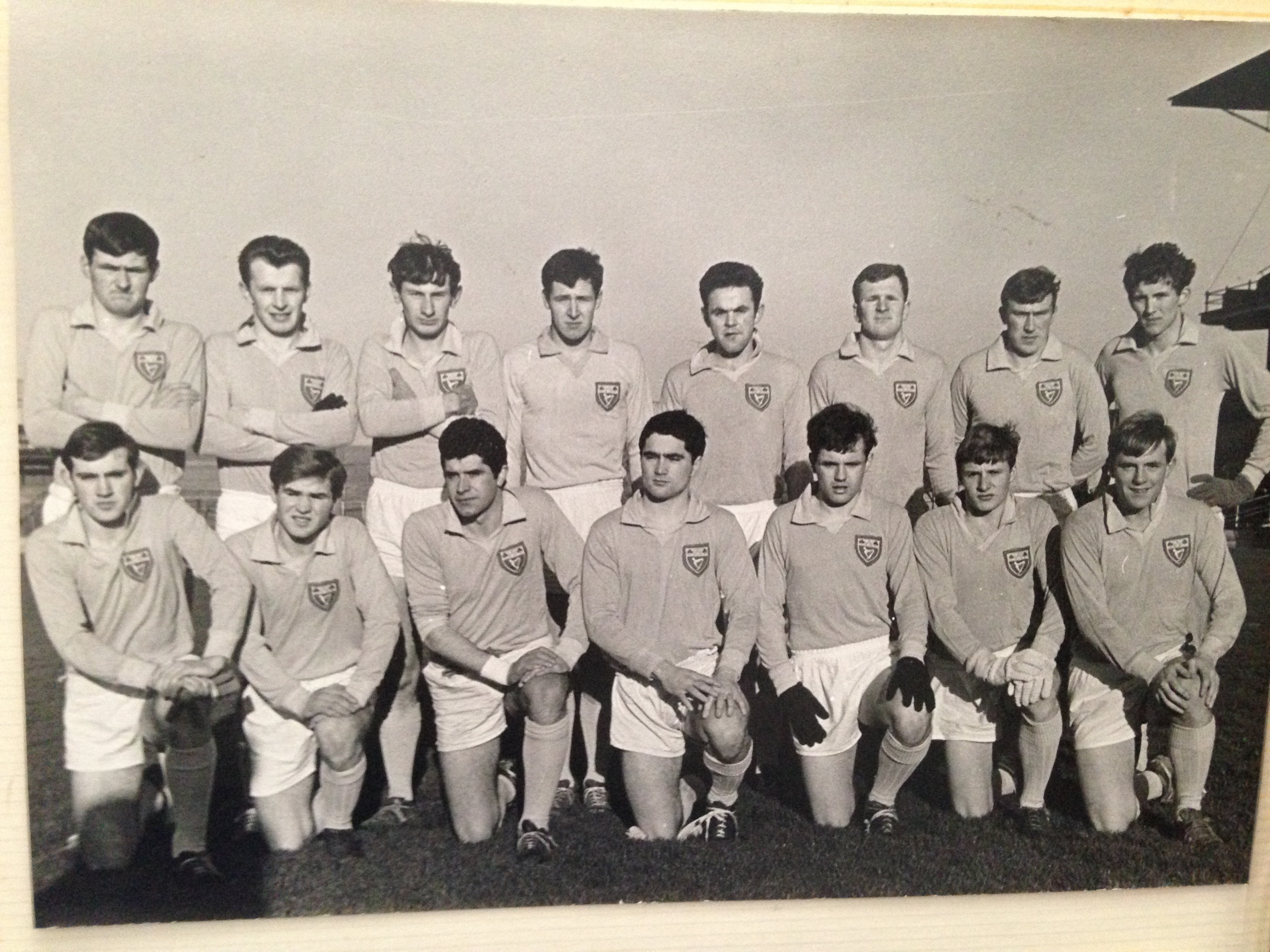
Picture of the Ucd sigerson cup winning team 1968 just prior to the final in Croke Park on 28 January 1968. Benny can be seen in the centre of the front row

Benny commenced his sporting career in UCD playing soccer and junior Gaelic football and by 1964 was playing in his first Sigerson. Remarkably, he played Dublin Senior Football Championship Football in four decades, starting with UCD in the 1960s. He won his first Dublin Senior Football Championship title with UCD in 1965 and then again in 1973. In 1965, he also won a Dublin Senior League title with UCD to complete the league and championship double.

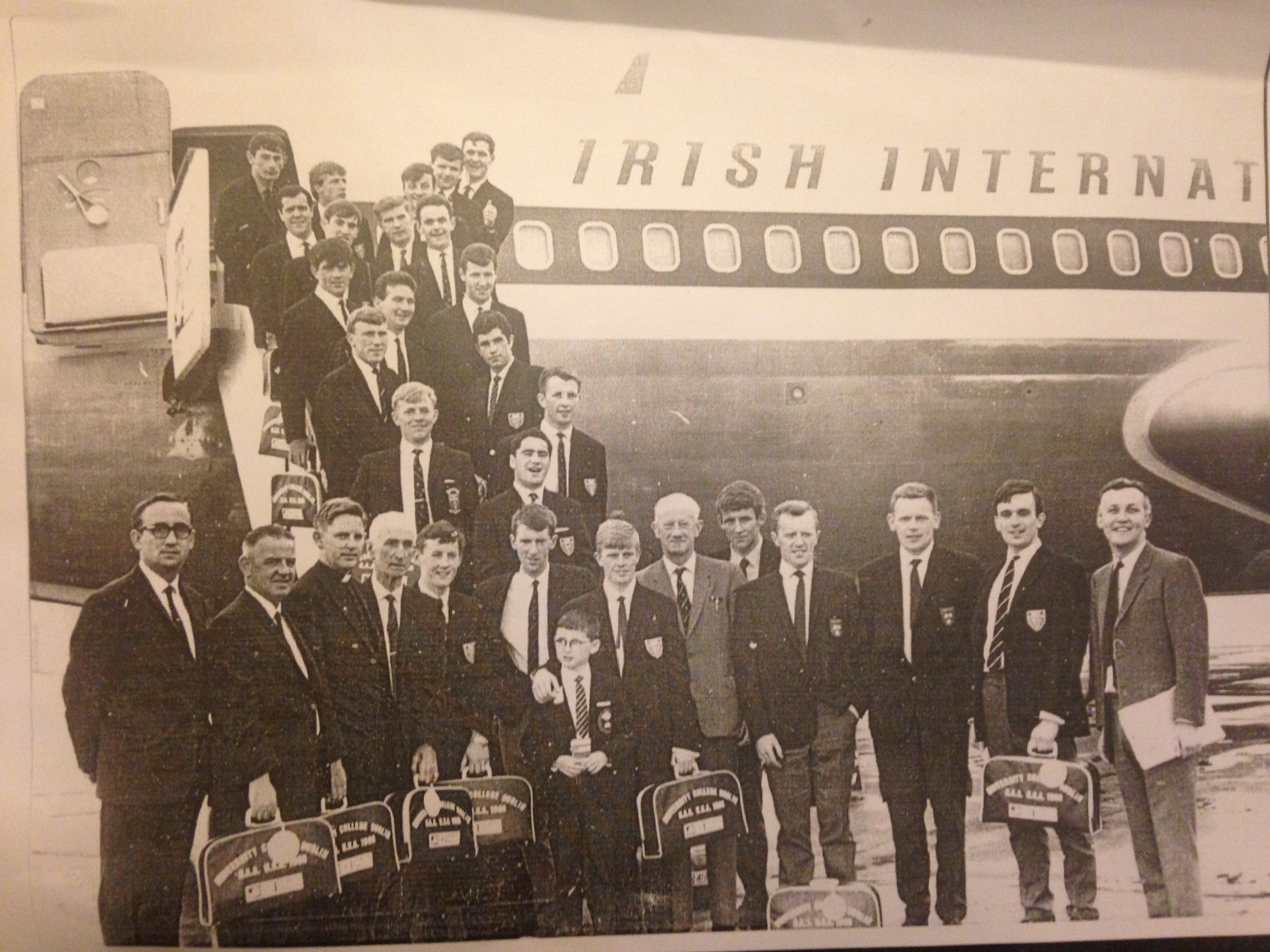
The University College Dublin Gaelic Football team before leaving Dublin airport for New York where they opened their American Tour by playing New York on 30 June 1968. Included in the front row are Mr B Devlin, chairman Dublin Football Board; Rev. B. Heffernan, president UCD Club; Mr P. Mc Donald, vice-president; Mr E McGee, secretary and Dr. J.J. Stuart, past-president of the GAA.

His first Sigerson was in 1964 when they got to the final and were defeated by Queen's University, starring Sean O'Neill who scored 2–3. Benny went on to play in the Sigerson Cup competition all the way from 1964 to 1972.

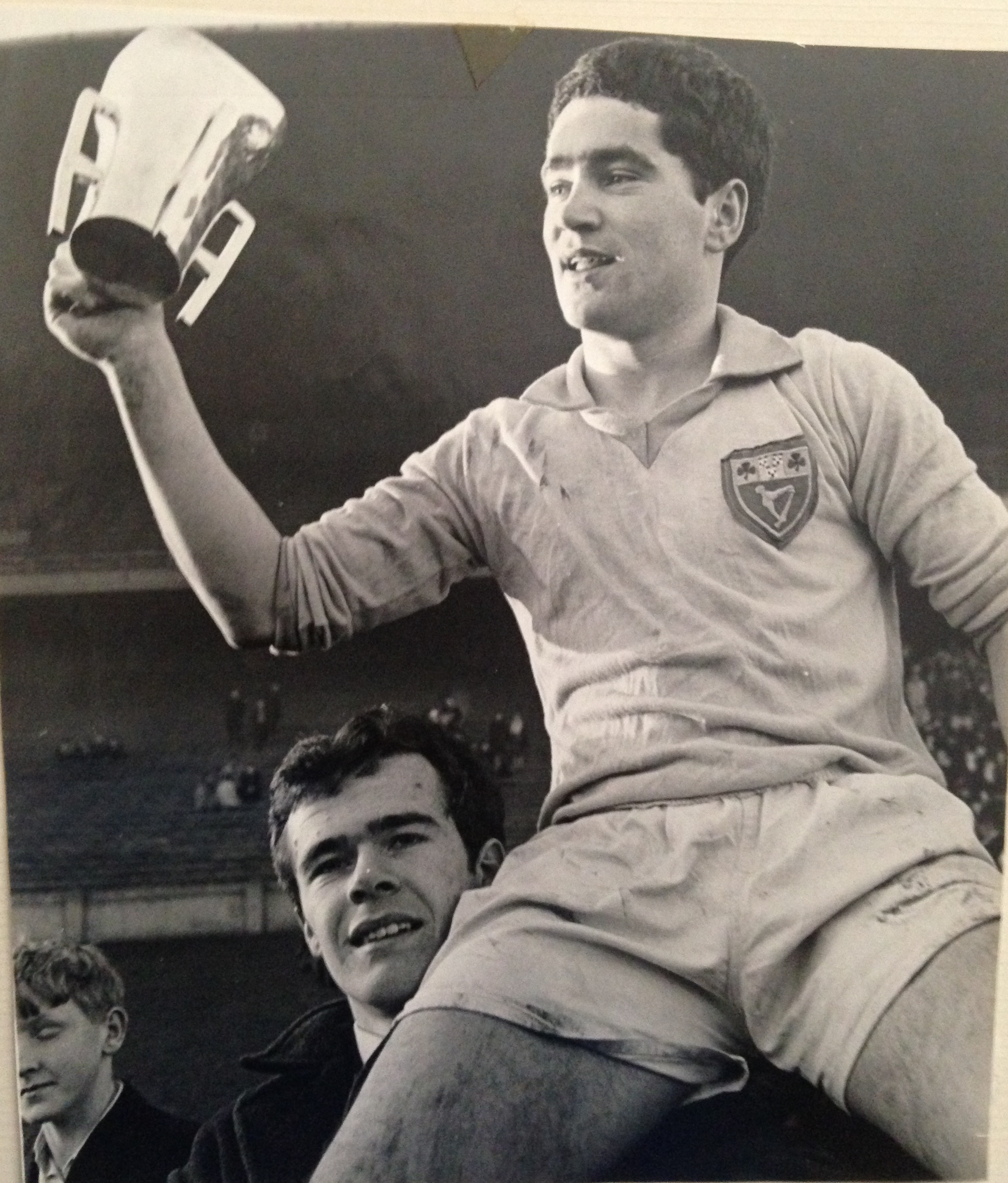
Benny holding the Sigerson Cup just after winning the final in January 1968 and being held aloft by UCD supporters

Benny captained UCD to win the Sigerson Cup in the 1967/68 season. He scored 7 points in the semi-final beating Trinity College in Santry. And he top scored in the final with 1–7, the goal finished from 35 yards after soloing and dummying through the defence. They beat UCG 1–10 to 0–4 in Croke Park. It was in this era in UDC Gaelic Football that the Captain, Benny, trained the team and organised team affairs. There was no team manager appointed. However, Gaughran was ably supported then by the up-and-coming Eugene McGee who later on became UCD Gaelic Football manager.

Benny toured with UCD when they became the first University GAA club to tour America in 1968 having been selected to represent Ireland in the Cardinal Crushing Games in New York. They also played a match against Hartford prison in Connecticut against a team who were all serving life sentences. UCD fielded a team of 15 but had to take off 4 players because the opposition had thought it was a soccer match - which UCD subsequently won.

Benny played for the UCD team which defeated Clanna Gael from Armagh in the All-Ireland club final in a replay in 1974.

Controversially, in 1971 when UCD beat UCC in the Sigerson Cup semi-final in Galway, there was an objection lodged that Gaughran was not properly registered - a claim which Gaughran maintained was incorrect. However, the ruling body upheld the objection and threw UCD out of the competition. Benny returned to play again with UCD the following year.

Benny was regarded by Kevin Heffernan as one of the best young footballers in Ireland when playing for UCD. Eugene McGee - Gaughran's manager for many years whilst playing for UCD - regarded him as one of the most dedicated players he had ever encountered. Donal McAnallen regarded Benny as one of the most prolific scorers and dedicated university players of the century.

==== Combined Universities ====
Gaughran was selected for the Combined Universities team on many occasions. In 1967, he had the honour of captaining the team which played against "The Galahs" who were visiting Ireland for the first time as part of their first world tour. "The Galahs" were captained by Ron Barassi.

==== Civil Service (Dublin) ====
Within weeks of this, he left UCD and joined Civil Service in 1974 and won his third Dublin Senior Football Championship title with them in 1980. At the age of 46, in his fourth different decade of senior football, he was still playing Dublin Senior Football Championship football and scored a vital goal to secure victory against Whitehall Colmcille in a replay at Parnell Park.

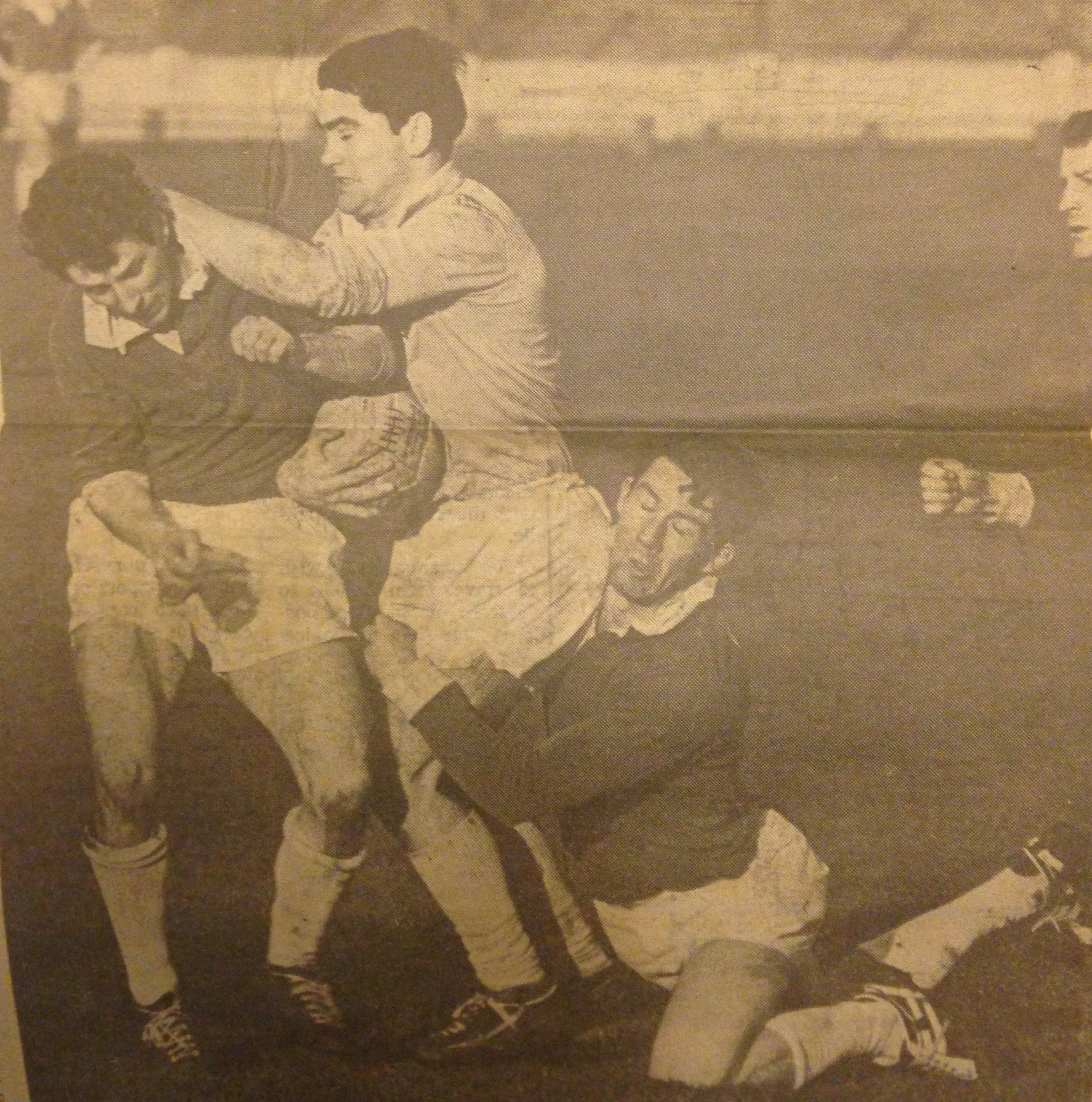
Benny playing for UCD

=== Interprovincial (Leinster) career ===
Having won All-Ireland club final title with UCD in 1974, Gaughran, in the same weekend, won and Interprovincial (Railway Cup) medal with Leinster.

=== Inter-County career (County Louth) ===
==== Senior ====
Benny made his debut for the Louth Senior team whilst still playing for the Louth Minor team in 1963. His debut was against Meath in Navan in the O'Byrne Cup. Thereafter, he was selected every year on the Louth panel from 1964 through to 1978, captaining his county in 1973. To the surprise of Gaughran, he was not selected for the Championship campaign in 1979, but made a return for the county in the 1983, attracting much media attention.

He played on the Louth team in 1975 that almost defeated Dublin, the then reigning All-Ireland Champions, in the Leinster semi-final. They lost 3–14 to 4-7 and at one stage were leading by 14 points.

In fact, in the 1970s they played and lost to three subsequent All-Ireland Champions - all three games hard and close - against Offaly, Meath & Dublin.

There were several memorable games for Gaughran playing for Louth. Notably, beating Kerry the then All-Ireland Champions in the late 1960s in the National Football League which sent the crowd wild and carried the team off the pitch. Similarly, they beat Armagh who lost to Dublin in the 1976 All-Ireland final. Again, the crowd carried them off the field in Dowdallshill, Dundalk. They drew with the then reigning All-Ireland Champions and National Football League Champions, Down, in a National Football League Division 1 game in Drogheda with Benny scoring 2 points.

== Managerial career ==
Benny Gaughran took over the job as manager of St. Sylvester's football team in Malahide in September, 1993.

=== Other sports ===
While studying law in UCD, Benny also played soccer. Liam Tuohy once tried to get him to return to soccer with Shamrock Rovers.

== Personal life ==
Benny is married and has 2 sons and 2 daughters. He lives and works in Malahide, County Dublin. His father, also called Benny Gaughran, was a professional soccer player during the 1930s and played for Bohemians, Celtic, Southampton, Sunderland, Rochdale and Dundalk. His grandfather, Laurence Soraghan, won a Louth Senior Football Championship medal with Geraldines in 1913. And coincidentally, Benny's son, Bernard, lost to Geraldines in the 2013 Leinster Intermediate Club Football Championship final after a replay playing for Naomh Olaf (Dublin).

== Honours ==
Clan na Gael (Louth)

- Louth Senior Football Championship:
  - Runner-up (1): 1964

UCD (Dublin)

- All-Ireland Senior Club Football Championship:
  - Winner (1): 1973–74
- Leinster Senior Club Football Championship:
  - Winner (1): 1973
- Dublin Senior Football Championship:
  - Winner (2): 1965, 1973
- Sigerson Cup:
  - Winner (1): 1967–68 (captain)
  - Runner-up (1): 1964
- Selected for Combined Universities Selection:
  - 1967 (captain)
- Dublin Senior Football League:
  - Winner (1): 1965

Civil Service (Dublin)

- Dublin Senior Football Championship:
  - Winner (1): 1980
  - Runner-up (1): 1979, 1992
- Letterkenny All-Ireland Football Seven-a-side tournament:
  - Winner (3):

Louth

- National Football League (Division 3):
  - Winner (1): 1982–83
- O'Byrne Cup:
  - Winner (1): 1963

Leinster

- Railway Cup:
  - Winner (1): 1974

== Awards ==
| Year | Award-giving body | Award | Result |
|---|---|---|---|
| 1968 | The Irish Press | Sports Star of the Week | Won |
| 1976 | www.hoganstand.com | Louth Gaelic Football Player of the Year | Won |
| 1976 | Louth Past/Present Players Association | GAA Sport Star Award (Senior Football) | Won |

Sporting positions
| Preceded by Jim Thornton | Louth Senior Football Captain; 1973 | Succeeded by Leslie Toal |

| Preceded by Danny Nugent | Louth Senior Football Captain; 1976 | Succeeded by Peadar Gallagher |
