= Norman Chalk =

English footballer

Personal information
- Full name: Norman William Chalk
- Date of birth: 28 October 1916
- Place of birth: Bitterne, Southampton, England
- Date of death: 2005 (aged 88–89)
- Height: 6 ft 0 in (1.83 m)
- Position: Half back

Youth career
- Bitterne C of E School
- Obelisk Rovers
- Woolston Wednesday

Senior career*
Years	Team	Apps	(Gls)
1937–1939	Southampton	5	(0)
- * Club domestic league appearances and goals

Norman William Chalk (28 October 1916 – 2005) was an English professional footballer who played as a half back for Southampton in the period before the Second World War.

== Football career ==
Chalk was born in the Bitterne area of Southampton and educated at the local Church of England School. He captained the Southampton Schools football team and gained schoolboy honours with Hampshire.

He was signed by Southampton as an amateur in May 1937 and awarded a professional contract four months later. Described as "strong and rugged", his first-team debut came on 7 May 1938, when he took the place of David Affleck in the final match of the season, a 4–0 defeat at Plymouth Argyle.

Chalk spent most of the next season back in the reserves until he was given a run of four matches at centre-half in April 1939, with both Affleck and George Smith unavailable, before losing his place to Tom Carnaby.

== Later career ==
At the end of the season, Chalk asked to be released from his contract and he joined the local police force, which he served until 1969. Following his retirement from the police, Chalk was employed part-time by a firm of solicitors, and continued to live in Southampton.
