= David Affleck =

Scottish footballer (1912–1984)

Personal information
- Full name: David Roy Affleck
- Date of birth: 26 July 1912
- Place of birth: Coylton, Ayrshire, Scotland
- Date of death: 11 August 1984 (aged 72)
- Place of death: Stoke-sub-Hamdon, Somerset, England
- Height: 6 ft 0 in (1.83 m)
- Position: Centre-half

Youth career
- Crosshouse Castle Rovers

Senior career*
Years	Team	Apps	(Gls)
1932–1934	Notts County	0	(0)
1934–1935	Bristol City	3	(0)
1935–1937	Clapton Orient	66	(0)
1937–1939	Southampton	61	(0)
1946–????	Yeovil Town	?	(?)
- * Club domestic league appearances and goals

David Roy Affleck (26 July 1912 – 11 August 1984) was a Scottish professional footballer who played as a centre-half for Clapton Orient and Southampton in the 1930s.

== Playing career ==
Affleck was born in Coylton, Ayrshire, on 26 July 1912 and played Scottish junior football with Crosshouse Castle Rovers. He joined Notts County in July 1932 but made no first team appearances before moving on to Bristol City in May 1934. After a season with City he joined Clapton Orient in July 1935, where he spent two seasons in the Third Division South.

Financial difficulties at Orient led to Affleck being sold to Southampton in May 1937, where he was recruited by Tom Parker as part of his drive to strengthen the team in an attempt to gain promotion from the Second Division, along with Frank Hill (from Blackpool), Billy Bevis (from Portsmouth) and Ray Parkin (from Middlesbrough).

After two seasons at The Dell, "his heading ability, coupled with some incisive tackling, reportedly attracted the attention of top London clubs, Tottenham Hotspur and Chelsea" but, unfortunately, the war interrupted his career and prevented a move to a bigger club. Affleck joined the Southampton police reservists and, during the war, turned out for the Southampton Police XI as well as making sporadic appearances for The Saints in wartime matches.

When hostilities were over, he was 33 years old and joined non-league Yeovil Town. He was now a full-time policeman and remained in Somerset for the rest of his life. Affleck died on 11 August 1984.
