= Fred Briggs (footballer) =

English footballer

Personal information
- Full name: Fred Briggs
- Date of birth: 1 May 1908
- Place of birth: Wombwell, England
- Date of death: 25 January 1998 (aged 89)
- Place of death: Reading, England
- Height: 5 ft 9 in (1.75 m)
- Position: Centre-forward

Youth career
- Mexborough Town
- 1932: Wombwell

Senior career*
Years	Team	Apps	(Gls)
1932–1935	Rotherham United	74	(17)
1935–1938	Reading	27	(6)
1938–1939	Southampton	36	(14)
1939–1940	Southampton (guest)		
1940–?	Wrexham (guest)		
?	Accrington Stanley (guest)		
?	Fulham (guest)		
?	Watford (guest)		
- * Club domestic league appearances and goals

Fred Briggs (1 May 1908 – 25 January 1998) was an English professional footballer who played as a forward for Rotherham United, Reading and Southampton in the 1930s.

== Playing career ==
=== Rotherham United ===
He was born in Wombwell and played as a youth for Mexborough Town and Wombwell before joining Third Division North team Rotherham United in May 1932. Essentially a right winger, Briggs came into the side at the start of the 1932–33 season and played in nine of the opening ten games. His subsequent appearances were spread out, with six successive games being his best spell. He had only netted a couple of goals before he rounded off the season with a brace in the last game of the season, a 6–1 home victory over Halifax Town.

Following the arrival of George Raynor the next season, Briggs switched to inside-forward missing just five league games; he stepped up his scoring rate, finding the net in four consecutive league games in March with seven goals in eight games. After the first six games of the 1934–35 season he lost his place to Roland Bastow and played just three more games, his last being a 2–2 home draw against Crewe Alexandra on 15 December 1934. In his three years with the Millers, Briggs made a total of 80 appearances, scoring 18 goals.

=== Reading ===
He moved south to join Reading in June 1935, where he found first team opportunities scarce, making only 27 league appearances in three seasons.

=== Southampton ===
In May 1938, he was signed on a free transfer by Second Division Southampton. Manager Tom Parker saw him as the ideal player to pair with Harry Osman up front. Briggs made his first start on 24 September 1938 in a defeat at Newcastle United, but soon settled into the side, forming a "useful partnership" with centre-forward Reg Tomlinson. In a run of twelve matches from mid-October to Christmas, he scored ten goals including a hat-trick at home to Swansea Town on 26 November. By the end of the season he was the Saints' top scorer with 14 goals.

=== Later career ===
The outbreak of war then brought Briggs's playing career to a premature end. Although he played for the "Saints" in the first wartime season, he moved on to guest for several clubs, including Wrexham, Accrington Stanley, Fulham and Watford.
