= Ted Withers =

English footballer

Personal information
- Full name: Edward Peter Withers
- Date of birth: 8 September 1915
- Place of birth: Ower, England
- Date of death: 7 January 1994 (aged 78)
- Place of death: Bournemouth, England
- Height: 5 ft 10 in (1.78 m)
- Position: Inside forward

Youth career
- Clarke's College, Southampton
- 1933–1934: Southampton

Senior career*
Years	Team	Apps	(Gls)
1934–1937	Southampton	6	(0)
1937–1938	Bristol Rovers	17	(4)
1938–1939	Bramtoco Sports		
Total		23	(4)
- * Club domestic league appearances and goals

Edward Peter Withers (8 September 1915 – 7 June 1994) was an English footballer who played as a forward for Southampton and Bristol Rovers in the 1930s. At Bristol Rovers, he acquired the nickname "Tosh".

== Football career ==
Withers was born in Ower, on the edge of the New Forest, and played youth football in the New Forest League. He was educated at Clarke's College in The Avenue, Southampton.

He joined the ground staff at Southampton Football Club as an amateur in August 1933. He soon "showed an eye for goal" and was given a professional contract in October 1934, becoming an established member of the reserves, playing in the Football Combination. He made his first-team debut when he took the place of the injured Dick Neal for the Second Division match at Swansea Town on 19 September 1936. Withers played at outside-right in this match, which ended in a 5–1 defeat. Withers made five more appearances that season as cover for injured players in various positions across the forward line, without scoring.

In December 1937, he moved to Bristol Rovers of the Third Division South, where he became a more settled member of the first team, making 17 league appearances, generally at inside-right, scoring four goals. In the summer of 1938, however, his professional career was over and he returned to Southampton, where he continued to play local non-league football with Bramtoco Sports.

== Later career ==
Within a year, he left Southampton to move to London where he worked as a sports masseur. After the Second World War, he returned to Hampshire and became an accountant.
