= Oswald Bowden =

English footballer

Personal information
- Full name: Oswald Bowden
- Date of birth: 7 September 1912
- Place of birth: Byker, England
- Date of death: 20 May 1977 (aged 64)
- Place of death: Newcastle upon Tyne, England
- Height: 5 ft 10 in (1.78 m)
- Position: Inside forward

Youth career
- Newcastle United Swifts
- 1929–1930: Newcastle United

Senior career*
Years	Team	Apps	(Gls)
1930–1935	Derby County	10	(1)
1935–1937	Nottingham Forest	14	(3)
1937–1938	Brighton & Hove Albion	2	(0)
1938–1939	Southampton	2	(0)
- * Club domestic league appearances and goals

Oswald "Ossie" Bowden (7 September 1912 – 20 May 1977) was an English footballer who played as an inside-forward for various clubs in the 1930s.

== Football career ==
Bowden was born in Byker, Newcastle upon Tyne and was a trainee at Newcastle United. Failing to obtain a professional contract on Tyneside, he joined Derby County in May 1930, where he made his first-team debut in the 1932–33 season at inside-right. In his five years at Derby he spent most of his career in the reserves, managing only ten appearances in the Football League First Division.

He moved to East Midlands rivals, Nottingham Forest in June 1935, where he spent a further two seasons of reserve-team football, making only 14 first-team appearances in the Second Division. He then spent a season with Brighton & Hove Albion, making only one appearance before moving along the south coast to return to the Second Division with Southampton.

He made his "Saints" debut in the opening match of the 1938–39 season, playing at inside-left in a 2–1 defeat at home to Tottenham Hotspur, before giving way to Arthur Holt. Bowden made only one further appearance in the first team, plus 25 for the reserves, before being released at the end of the season.

Following the outbreak of World War II, Bowden never played League football again.
