= George Woodford =

English footballer

Personal information
- Full name: George Arthur Woodford
- Date of birth: 22 April 1915
- Place of birth: Lymington, England
- Date of death: 21 April 1966 (aged 50)
- Place of death: Southampton, England
- Height: 5 ft 10 in (1.78 m)
- Position: Full back

Youth career
- Lymington

Senior career*
Years	Team	Apps	(Gls)
1934–1937	Norwich City	10	(0)
1937–1939	Southampton	7	(0)
1939	Lymington		
- * Club domestic league appearances and goals

George Arthur Woodford (22 April 1915 – 21 April 1966) was an English professional footballer who played as a full back for Norwich City and Southampton in the 1930s.

== Football career ==
Woodford was born at Lymington, but started his professional career at Norwich City. He had been spotted by Norwich City's scout in Hampshire, the former Southampton player, Jim Angell. He joined the Canaries as an amateur in October 1934, signing a professional contract in September 1935. He made his first-team debut on 4 April 1936 in a Second Division draw with Bradford City. After making ten league appearances for Norwich, Woodford followed manager Tom Parker to Second Division rivals Southampton in June 1937.

At The Dell, Woodford was used as cover for Charles Sillett and Arthur Roberts. He made his debut for the Saints at left back in a 3–1 victory against his former club, Norwich City, on New Year's Day 1938, when Roberts was injured. His next match was a fortnight later in a 3–0 defeat at Aston Villa, following which Roberts returned to the side. Woodford was "able to use both feet with equal facility" whose "outstanding traits (were) his industry and mobility".

Woodford returned to the side for four matches in April, but only played once more in the following season, after which he was released, joining his home-town club, Lymington.
