= Phil Griggs =

English footballer

Personal information
- Full name: Philip Ronald Griggs
- Date of birth: 12 June 1918
- Place of birth: Southampton, England
- Date of death: 30 June 1980 (aged 62)
- Place of death: Southampton, England
- Position: Inside right

Youth career
- Sholing Boys
- Spring Albion

Senior career*
Years	Team	Apps	(Gls)
1937–1939	Southampton	1	(0)
- * Club domestic league appearances and goals

Philip Ronald Griggs (12 June 1918 – 30 June 1980) was an English professional footballer who played one match as an inside forward for Southampton in the final season before the Second World War.

== Football career ==
Griggs was born in Southampton and represented the town at football. He was a member of the Southampton Schoolboys' team which reached the national schoolboys' final in 1932 and he later played for the FA Amateur XI.

He joined Southampton as an amateur in June 1937 and turned professional in April 1939. His only first-team appearance came in the final match of the 1938–39 season, when manager Tom Parker made five changes for the match at Plymouth Argyle, which ended in a 2–0 defeat.

During the Second World War, Griggs lost a leg thus preventing his return to football.
