= Bill Clarke (footballer, born 1916) =

English footballer

Personal information
- Full name: William Henry Clarke
- Date of birth: 2 July 1916
- Place of birth: Leicester, England
- Date of death: June 1986 (aged 69)
- Place of death: Leicester, England
- Height: 5 ft 7 in (1.70 m)
- Position: Outside left

Youth career
- Leicester Nomads

Senior career*
Years	Team	Apps	(Gls)
1936–1937	Leicester City	0	(0)
1937–1938	Exeter City	12	(1)
1938–1939	Southampton	2	(0)
1939	Cheltenham Town	0	(0)
- * Club domestic league appearances and goals

William Henry Clarke (2 July 1916 – June 1986) was an English professional footballer who played as an outside-forward for Exeter City and Southampton in the 1930s.

== Football career ==
Clarke was born in Leicester and after playing youth football with Leicester Nomads, he signed for Leicester City in February 1936.

Although he was included in City's team photograph at the start of the 1936–37 season, Clarke failed to break into the first-team and in the following summer he moved to join Exeter City of the Football League Third Division South.

At St James Park, Clarke was back-up to Fred Liddle, making twelve League and two FA Cup appearances, scoring once, before moving along the south coast in July 1938 to join Second Division Southampton.

At The Dell, Clarke was again only a reserve team player and it was not until 15 April 1939 that he made his first-team debut, in a 3–0 defeat at Blackburn Rovers. His second and last appearance came in the final fixture of the 1938–39 season, away to Plymouth Argyle.

In the summer of 1939, Clarke was offered a free transfer and joined Cheltenham Town in the Southern League but the outbreak of the Second World War brought his professional football career to an end.
