= Billy Bevis =

English footballer

Personal information
- Full name: William Ernest Bevis
- Date of birth: 29 September 1918
- Place of birth: Warsash, England
- Date of death: 22 August 1994 (aged 75)
- Place of death: Warsash, England
- Height: 5 ft 5 in (1.65 m)
- Position: Outside forward

Youth career
- Gosport Borough
- 1934–1936: Portsmouth

Senior career*
Years	Team	Apps	(Gls)
1936–1937	Portsmouth	0	(0)
1937–1947	Southampton	82	(17)
1947–1949	Winchester City		
1949–1951	Cowes Sports		
1951–1952	Winchester City		
1952–1953	Warsash		
- * Club domestic league appearances and goals

William Ernest Bevis DSM (29 September 1918 – 22 August 1994) was an English footballer who played for Southampton as an outside right in the years either side of the Second World War.

== Football career ==
=== Portsmouth ===
Bevis was born in Warsash, Hampshire and played football as a youth with Gosport Borough before joining Portsmouth as a trainee in February 1934. He signed a professional contract with Portsmouth in July 1936, but failed to break through into the first team at Fratton Park.

=== Southampton ===
In July 1937, he was one of several players recruited by Southampton's newly appointed manager Tom Parker, who was trying to build a side to push for promotion from Division Two. Bevis was immediately drafted into the first team as an 18-year-old, replacing the injured John Summers, for his debut in a 0–0 draw with Aston Villa on 4 September 1937.

Bevis soon gained a reputation as a speedy right-winger and made 31 appearances in the 1937–38 season, scoring five goals. In the following season he only missed five matches, making 37 appearances and scoring six goals, including a "spectacular" hat-trick in a 3–1 victory at Swansea Town on 1 April 1939. His crosses also laid on scoring opportunities for the central forwards Reg Tomlinson and Fred Briggs who scored 12 and 14 league goals respectively, as the "Saints" finished 18th in the table, four points above the relegation zone. At the end of the season, Newcastle United made an enquiry about Bevis's availability.

Bevis's football career was then interrupted by the outbreak of the Second World War, although he continued to appear for the Saints in the wartime leagues in the early months of the war. He then joined the Merchant navy as a petty officer gunner and during the war the ships on which he was serving were torpedoed three times and mined once. After one of these attacks, he spent seven days adrift in the Atlantic before being rescued. One of the crew who rescued him was a former colleague from Southampton, reserve team goalkeeper Alec Warnock. Bevis was later presented with the Distinguished Service Medal by King George VI at Buckingham Palace.

After being demobbed in November 1945, Bevis returned to The Dell. He made 14 appearances, scoring five goals, in the 1946–47 season before losing his place on the right wing to Wilf Grant. At the end of the season, despite receiving an offer from Plymouth Argyle, he decided to retire.

== Later career ==
On retiring from football, he returned to the sea while turning out occasionally for various non-league clubs, including Winchester City, Cowes Sports and Warsash. He settled in Park Gate, near his place of birth, where he died in August 1994.
