= Tom Emanuel =

Welsh footballer

Personal information
- Full name: Thomas D. Emanuel
- Date of birth: 1 August 1915
- Place of birth: Treboeth, Wales
- Date of death: 1997 (aged 81–82)
- Height: 5 ft 7 in (1.70 m)
- Position: Full back

Youth career
- ICI Works

Senior career*
Years	Team	Apps	(Gls)
1935–1938	Swansea Town	46	(1)
1938–1946	Southampton	33	(0)
1939–1940	→ Swindon Town (Wartime guest)		
- → Wrexham (Wartime guest)
1946	Milford United		
1946–1948	Llanelly		
- * Club domestic league appearances and goals

Thomas D. Emanuel (1 August 1915 – 1997) was a Welsh footballer who played at left-back for Swansea Town and Southampton in the 1930s and 1940s.

== Football career ==
Emanuel was born in the Treboeth district of Swansea and played rugby in his schooldays. It was only when he was working for ICI that he first played "soccer". He was playing in the final of a local cup competition at Vetch Field when his "impressive form" prompted Swansea Town to offer him a professional contract.

He spent three seasons with Swansea before he was signed by Southampton's manager Tom Parker for a fee of £2,200, to replace Arthur Roberts who had joined Swansea in August. Emanuel made his Saints' debut on 24 September 1938, in a 1–0 defeat at Newcastle United. He soon settled into the Southampton defence and the fee looked to have been "money well spent". Emanuel only missed three matches in the remainder of the 1938–39 season and also played the first three matches in the following season before League football was abandoned during the Second World War.

During the war, Emanuel made guest appearances for Swindon Town and Wrexham. His military service took him to India, North Africa, Burma and Madagascar.

Emanuel returned to The Dell after the war and made two appearances in the FA Cup against Newport County in January 1946, before joining Llanelly.

== Later career ==
He retired from football in 1948 and became a bus inspector in Swansea where he spent the rest of his life.

== Family ==
His younger brother, Len was a Wales schoolboy international who played at left back for Swansea Town and Newport County. Len's son Gary Emmanuel was a Wales under-23 footballer who played for Birmingham City, Bristol Rovers, Swindon Town, Newport County, Bristol City and Swansea City.
