= Henry Long (footballer) =

English footballer

Personal information
- Full name: Henry Robert Long
- Date of birth: 15 October 1914
- Place of birth: Southampton, England
- Date of death: 11 May 1989 (aged 74)
- Place of death: Southampton, England
- Height: 5 ft 9 in (1.75 m)
- Positions: Left-half; outside left

Youth career
- Harland & Wolff

Senior career*
Years	Team	Apps	(Gls)
- Ryde Sports
1933–1938	Southampton	5	(0)
1938–1939	Newport (IOW)		
- * Club domestic league appearances and goals

Henry Robert Long (15 October 1914 – 11 May 1989) was an English professional footballer who played in the Football League for Southampton in the 1930s, either at left-half or outside-left.

== Football career ==
Long was born in Southampton and attended Northam School. he was a member of the Southampton Schools team which reached the finals of the English Schools Shield in 1929.

After playing for the Harland & Wolff shipbuilders works team and Ryde Sports on the Isle of Wight, Long joined Southampton of the Football League Second Division as an amateur in September 1933, becoming a professional in October 1934, aged 20. He played regularly in the reserve team during his five years with the Saints, but his first-team debut came on 7 September 1936 when he replaced Billy Kingdon for a 1–0 win over Doncaster Rovers. He made only one further appearance in 1936–37 and three the following season, once at left-half and twice at outside-left over the Christmas period (both draws against Swansea Town) in place of Harry Osman, who had switched to the inside-left in the absence of Arthur Holt. In the second match against Swansea, Ted Bates made his debut at inside-right; he was to go on to be involved with Southampton, as player, manager and chairman until his death 66 years later.

In the 1938 close season, Long left the club and joined Newport on the Isle of Wight.
