= Alf Day =

Welsh footballer

Personal information
- Full name: Alfred Day
- Date of birth: 2 October 1907
- Place of birth: Ebbw Vale, Wales
- Date of death: 15 November 1997 (aged 90)
- Height: 5 ft 8 in (1.73 m)
- Position: Wing half

Youth career
- Ebbw Vale

Senior career*
Years	Team	Apps	(Gls)
- Cheshunt
1928–1931	Northfleet United		
1931–1936	Tottenham Hotspur	13	(0)
1936–1937	Millwall	5	(0)
1937–1938	Southampton	22	(0)
1938–1939	Tranmere Rovers	32	(0)
1939–1940	Swindon Town	0	(0)

International career
1933	Wales	1	(0)
- * Club domestic league appearances and goals

Alfred Day (2 October 1907 – 15 November 1997) was a Welsh professional footballer who played at wing half for Tottenham Hotspur, Millwall, Southampton, Tranmere Rovers, Swindon Town in the 1930s and represented Wales at international level on one occasion.

== Playing career ==
Day was born in Ebbw Vale and attended Pontygof School. After playing youth football with his home-town club, he moved to London where he began his career at non League club Cheshunt. In May 1931, he signed for Tottenham Hotspur as a trainee, being "farmed out" to the Spurs' nursery team Northfleet United, where he joined his former Ebbw Vale colleague, Eugene "Taffy" O'Callaghan.

On 4 November 1933, Day made his only international appearance for Wales. The Football Association of Wales secretary, Ted Robbins, rang the secretary at Spurs, Arthur Turner, to enquire if he knew anyone who could help out the depleted Welsh team. Turner mentioned that he had a promising reserve half-back who he believed was Welsh, leading to Day being capped before having appeared in League football. The match at Windsor Park, Belfast against Northern Ireland ended in a 1–1 draw.

Shortly afterwards, Day made his debut for the Spurs' first-team, going on to make 14 appearances in all competitions. The form of fellow-Welshman Tom Evans at right half prevented Day from becoming a regular in the Spurs' side, with nine of his League appearances coming in the 1934–35 season at the end of which Spurs were relegated from Division One. Despite his limited first-team appearances, Day made 139 appearances in the reserves in London Combination matches.

He joined Millwall in 1936 where he spent one season and participated in five matches in the Third Division South, before joining Second Division Southampton on a free transfer in the summer of 1937.

At The Dell, Day took over from Cyril King for the first half of the 1937–38 season before King returned in December. Day was described as "a calm, neat player who specialised in the ground pass rather than the cleared high ball", he had solid defensive qualities, but tended to "dwell on the ball" and "his thoughtful distribution was sometimes marred by his being caught in possession". Day was never fully appreciated by the Dell crowd and moved on to Tranmere Rovers after 12 months.

After a season with Tranmere in which Day made 32 League and one FA Cup appearance, at the end of which they were relegated from the Second Division, Day moved again to join Swindon Town in June 1939. He made his debut for Swindon at home to Aldershot on 2 September, the day before World War II was declared. Day remained with Swindon until June 1940, making a further 29 appearances in wartime competitions.

== Later career ==
During the war he was a telephone operator in the Royal Air Force, but appeared as a guest for Brighton & Hove Albion, Lincoln City, Ipswich Town and Reading. After the war, he was employed at Brimsdown Power Station in North London, continuing to live in the area up to his death in 1997.

In 2005, his Wales international cap and shirt came up for auction.
