= John Summers (footballer) =

English footballer (1915–1991)

Personal information
- Full name: John Lawrence Summers
- Date of birth: 8 February 1915
- Place of birth: Chorlton, England
- Date of death: 12 April 1991 (aged 76)
- Place of death: Southampton, England
- Height: 5 ft 9 in (1.75 m)
- Position: Outside right

Youth career
- 1931–1932: Manchester North End

Senior career*
Years	Team	Apps	(Gls)
1932	Burnley	0	(0)
1932	→ Fleetwood (loan)		
1932–1933	Preston North End	0	(0)
1933–1934	Tunbridge Wells Rangers		
1934–1935	Leicester City	11	(2)
1935–1936	Derby County	2	(0)
1936–1938	Southampton	31	(7)
- * Club domestic league appearances and goals

John Lawrence Summers (8 February 1915 – 12 April 1991) was an English professional footballer who played as an outside-forward for various clubs in the 1930s, including Leicester City, Derby County and Southampton in the Football League before becoming a police officer in Southampton.

== Football career ==
Summers was born in the Chorlton area of Manchester and represented both Manchester Schools and Lancashire Schools at football. His football career started in the Cheshire County League before joining Burnley as a trainee aged 17 in February 1932. During his brief time at Turf Moor, Summers joined Fleetwood of the Lancashire Combination on loan. He was offered a trial at Manchester United but the Burnley management refused him permission, following which he joined Preston North End.

Unable to break into first-team football at Preston, he then moved south to join Tunbridge Wells Rangers of the Southern League for a season, before returning to the Football League with Leicester City in April 1934. He made his debut for Leicester on 1 September 1934, when he scored the consolation goal in a 3–1 defeat at Chelsea in the Football League Division One. He retained his place in the side until the end of September before being replaced by the veteran Hugh Adcock; Summers regained his place for five matches in November/December before losing out again to Adcock. With Adcock coming to the end of his career, Leicester signed Welsh international Eugene "Taffy" O'Callaghan in March 1935, and Summers was released at the end of the season.

In May 1935, Summers joined another First Division club, Derby County, where he was used as cover for the England international, Sammy Crooks. Having made only two appearances for the Derby first-team, Summers was sold to Southampton of the Second Division in October 1936, for a fee of £250.

Summers' transfer fee to join Southampton was partly met by the Southampton Supporters Club. He made his debut, taking the place of Fred Tully at outside-right for a 2–0 defeat at Fulham on 10 October 1936. Summers retained his place for the remainder of the season, other than a period over Easter 1937, and "formed an encouraging partnership" with Dick Neal who played alongside him at inside-right. Summers played the first two matches of the following season before sustaining an injury and, although he made a brief comeback, his place on the right had gone to the younger Billy Bevis and, at the end of the season, Summers retired.

== Later career ==
Following his retirement from professional football, Summers joined the Southampton Police and served as a police officer until his retirement in 1968. He continued to play football with the Southampton Police team, helping them win the Police Cup in 1948 (shared with Sheffield Police) and 1951. His playing career ended in 1954, but he continued to be involved with the police team, later becoming chairman of the Southampton Police football section until 1990.

He remained in Southampton for the rest of his life, dying there on 12 April 1991, aged 76.
