= Billy Dunn (footballer, born 1910) =

Scottish footballer

Personal information
- Full name: William Marshall Dunn
- Date of birth: 9 October 1910
- Place of birth: Lambhill, Scotland
- Date of death: 7 September 1980 (aged 69)
- Place of death: Glasgow, Scotland
- Height: 5 ft 10 in (1.78 m)
- Position: Centre forward

Youth career
- Newton Villa
- –1933: Ashfield

Senior career*
Years	Team	Apps	(Gls)
1933–1935	Celtic	9	(2)
- → Newton Villa (loan)
1935–1937	Brentford	3	(1)
1937–1938	Southampton	14	(3)
1938–1940	Raith Rovers	29	(14)
1939	→ Bo'ness (loan)		
1939–1940	→ Dumbarton (guest)		
1942	→ Albion Rovers (guest)		
1942	→ Leeds United (guest)		
- * Club domestic league appearances and goals

William Marshall Dunn (9 October 1910 – 7 September 1980) was a Scottish professional footballer who played at centre forward for Celtic, Brentford and Southampton in the 1930s.

== Football career ==
Dunn was born in the Lambhill district of Glasgow, one of a family of 9 footballing brothers. After playing for Newton Villa and Ashfield, he joined Celtic in February 1933. Having been a prolific scorer in junior football, he continued to score for the reserves, with 51 goals in just over two years, but was unable to carry this form into the first team. He made his first-team debut in a 1–1 draw at St Johnstone on 23 September 1933, and played nine first team games for Celtic, with two goals.

In the summer of 1935, he moved south to join Brentford of the Football League First Division. He was again a prolific scorer in the reserves but only managed one goal in his three first-team matches before he was transferred to Southampton in May 1937.

On his arrival at The Dell, the local newspaper praised "his skill and marksmanship". At the start of the 1937–38 season, he took over the centre-forward position previously held by Jimmy Dunne, who had returned to his native Ireland in the summer. His debut came in the opening match of the season, when he scored in a 4–3 defeat at Norwich City. He retained the number 9 shirt for the first nine matches of the season without scoring again and in October he was replaced by Benny Gaughran. Dunn spent most of the rest of the season in the reserves, making only six more first-team appearances, with three more goals.

At the end of the season, he refused a new contract and was transfer listed for a fee of £750. He eventually moved back to Scotland to join Raith Rovers, where he had a spell on loan to Bo'ness.

During the Second World War, he made a guest appearance at left back for Leeds United in a 7–2 victory over Newcastle United in January 1943.
