= Reg Tomlinson =

English footballer

Personal information
- Full name: Reginald William Tomlinson
- Date of birth: 2 July 1914
- Place of birth: Sleaford, England
- Date of death: 16 May 1971 (aged 56)
- Place of death: Bitterne, Southampton, England
- Height: 6 ft 0 in (1.83 m)
- Position: Centre-forward

Youth career
- Horncastle Town

Senior career*
Years	Team	Apps	(Gls)
1935–1938	Grimsby Town	20	(2)
1938–1939	Southampton	36	(12)
- * Club domestic league appearances and goals

Reginald William Tomlinson (2 July 1914 – 16 May 1971) was an English professional footballer who played at centre-forward for Grimsby Town and Southampton in the 1930s before becoming a police officer in Southampton.

== Football career ==
Tomlinson was born in Sleaford, Lincolnshire and started his professional football career with Grimsby Town of the Football League First Division in August 1935. During his three seasons at Blundell Park, Tomlinson found first-team opportunities rare and made only 20 Football League appearances, scoring twice.

In May 1938, he moved to the south coast, to join Second Division Southampton for "a substantial fee". He made his debut for the Saints in a 3–0 defeat at Coventry City on 10 September 1938 and retained his place at centre-forward for the remainder of the season. His first goals came when he scored twice in a 4–3 victory over Sheffield Wednesday on 15 October, followed by goals in the next two matches. Described as "quick for a big man and possessing a good shot", he soon formed a "useful partnership" with Fred Briggs at inside-forward. Tomlinson finished the season having scored 12 goals from 36 appearances.

He played in two matches in the abandoned 1939–40 season and returned to The Dell for two War Cup matches in 1943, and also played as a guest for Portsmouth.

== Later career ==
Following the outbreak of war, Tomlinson joined Southampton Police and after the war became a member of the Police football team helping them win the Police Cup in 1948 (shared with Sheffield Police) and 1951, as well as the Hampshire League Division Two title in 1947.

He remained with the police until his retirement in 1970. He continued to live in Southampton where he died on 16 May 1971, aged 56.
