= Fred Williams (footballer, born 1918) =

English footballer

Personal information
- Full name: Frederick Arthur Williams
- Date of birth: 15 April 1918
- Place of birth: Hucknall, England
- Date of death: 26 June 1994 (aged 76)
- Height: 5 ft 8 in (1.73 m)
- Position: Full back

Youth career
- Hucknall Colts
- 1937–1938: Southampton

Senior career*
Years	Team	Apps	(Gls)
1938–1939	Southampton	22	(0)
- → Mansfield Town (wartime guest)
	→ Liverpool (wartime guest)	4	(0)
1946–1947	Stockport County	0	(0)
1947–1959	Linby Colliery		
- * Club domestic league appearances and goals

Frederick Arthur Williams (15 April 1918 – 26 June 1994) was an English professional footballer who played as a full back for Southampton in the period immediately prior to the Second World War.

== Football career ==
Williams was born in Hucknall, near Nottingham, and worked as a coalminer before moving to the south coast in 1937 to join Southampton's nursery side. He signed a professional contract in May 1938. Described as "a tough tackling defender", he "made rapid progress through the ranks" and was promoted to the first team for the start of the 1938–39 season.

His first-team debut came in a 2–1 Football League Second Division defeat against Tottenham Hotspur on 27 August 1938 and he retained his place at right-back until an ankle injury in January ruled him out for the rest of the season. Williams played once at the start of the next season, before league football was suspended.

On the outbreak of the Second World War, Williams returned to Nottinghamshire and made guest appearances for Mansfield Town and Liverpool, for whom he made four appearances in 1942–43.

Following the war, he joined Stockport County but left them in 1947 without having played a league game.

== Later career ==
In 1947, Williams returned again to Hucknall and resumed his career as a coalminer, although he continued to play for Linby Colliery in the Central Alliance until 1959. In 1950, Linby Colliery had a long run in the FA Cup, reaching the First Round proper, where they were eliminated 1–0 by Gillingham of the Football League Third Division South.
