= Benny Gaughran (footballer, born 1915) =

Irish footballer

Personal information
- Full name: Bernard Michael Gaughran
- Date of birth: 29 September 1915
- Place of birth: Dublin, Ireland
- Date of death: 20 September 1977 (aged 61)
- Position: Centre-forward

Senior career*
Years	Team	Apps	(Gls)
1935–1936	Bohemians	21	(15)
1936–1937	Celtic		
1937	Southampton	7	(4)
1937–1938	Sunderland	2	(0)
1938–1939	Rochdale		
1939–1940	Dundalk		
- * Club domestic league appearances and goals

Bernard Michael "Benny" Gaughran (29 September 1915 – 20 September 1977) was an Irish soccer player during the 1930s. Gaughran won the League of Ireland title with Bohemians in 1935–36.

Gaughran later went on to play professionally for Celtic, Southampton, Sunderland, Rochdale and Dundalk.

== Playing career ==
Bernard Gaughran, playing for Bohemians.

=== Early career ===
When Gaughran was young, he played Gaelic football for St. Laurence O'Tooles and subsequently took up rugby with O'Connell Schools, where he had great possibilities as a full back. Gaughran's main sport was rugby until he was 18, when he played his first game of Association Football. While with O'Connell Schools, he played for Leinster against Connacht in a schools' junior interprovincial tournament. He later joined Clontarf, where he played a few games for them. Before his time with the Bohemians, he played six matches for a junior team in the Phoenix Park, scoring 36 goals for them.

Charlie Harris, the Bohemians' trainer succeeded in inducing him to take up Association Football. Gaughran believed that his rugby training gave him a good grounding for soccer and that "if one could kick an oval ball accurately there should be no great difficulty in learning how to control a round one." After a few games with Bohemians' Leinster League team, he made his debut for their Free State team against Waterford at Kilcohan Park and very soon attracted the attention of a number of cross-channel clubs.

His Bohemian teammates included Harry Cannon, Plev Ellis, Fred Horlacher and Billy Jordan that season, and Gaughran was the top scorer with 15 goals in 21 league games. In his 39 appearances that season in all competitions, he netted 32 times. In 1936, Gaughran was part of the team who broke a record by winning the fifth league title of the free State League Championship by defeating Cork 4–1. Gaughran scored the third and fourth goals of the game.

Arsenal were very keen to sign him towards the close of the 1935–36 season, and sent their chief scout to sign him, but were unsuccessful.

=== Interest from UK clubs ===
At the start of the 1936–37 season, there was interest in Gaughran from several UK football clubs, including Arsenal, Wolverhampton Wanderers, Burnley, Blackburn Rovers and Manchester United. Scouts from Manchester United arrived to vet Gaughran, and were satisfied enough to make arrangements to sign him. Louis Rocca, United's Chief Scout, travelled to Bray in November 1936 to complete the deal. Rocca was disappointed to arrive in Dublin only to discover that Glasgow Celtic's representative, Johnny Paton, had stepped in and topped United's offer, bringing Benny Gaughran to Glasgow after tentative terms were agreed. In fact, Celtic were watching Gaughran's progress for 13 months and when news began to filter through of other clubs' interest, Celtic acted promptly.

=== Career after Bohemians ===
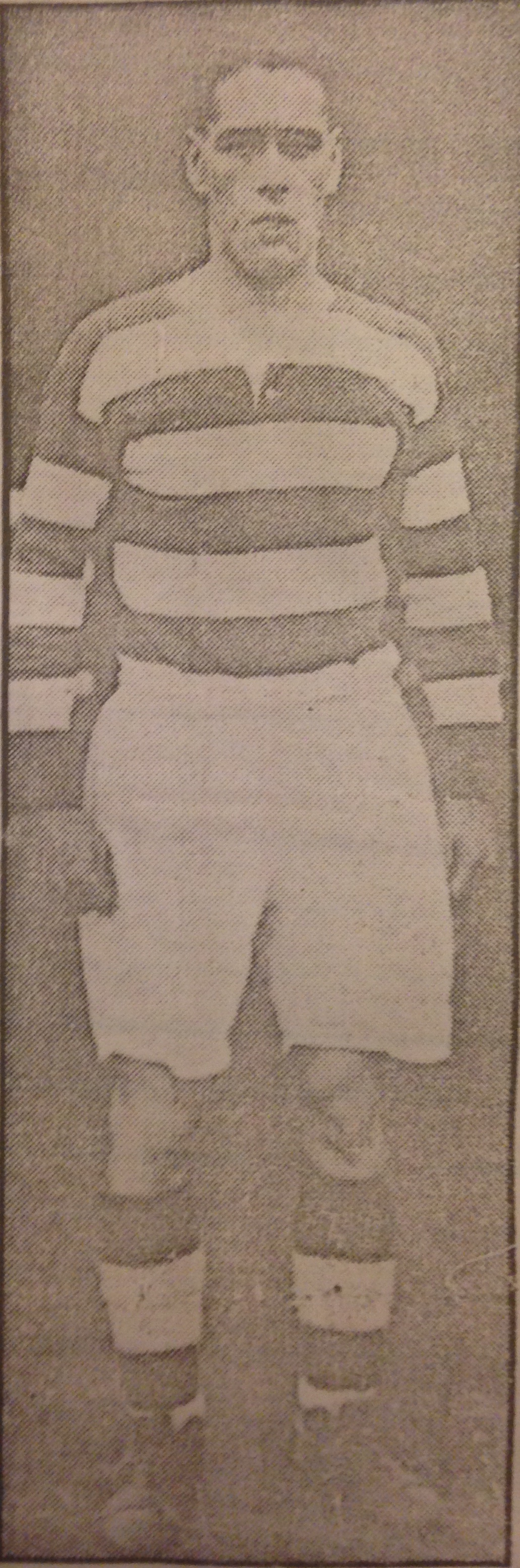
Benny Gaughran, centre forward from Dublin, having just transferred from Bohemians, just before playing his first game in Glasgow Celtic colors on 21 November 1936

Gaughran joined Celtic in November 1936 as a center-forward at 20 years of age. In June 1937, he moved to England to join Southampton, where he stayed for five months before joining Sunderland in November. After six months with Sunderland, he moved on to join Rochdale and then returned to Ireland in 1939 to join Dundalk. At Southampton, Gaughran had seven league appearances and four goals, giving him an average strike rate of one goal every 1.75 games

== Personal life ==
=== Education and work outside of sports ===
When he started his football career, he was a salesman. Later on in life, in the 1960's and 1970's, he worked as a beekeeper.

=== Family ===
Bernard Gaughran was married with three children, two boys and a girl—Benny, Ken, and Laraine. His father, Bernard Gaughran Srme, was a well known hurler for Meath. His brother Charlie played Gaelic football for Dublin and his brother John had a career in Gaelic football, rugby and soccer. His son, Benny Gaughran, was a Gaelic footballer and won an All-Ireland Club medal with UCD (Dublin), three Dublin Championship club medals (one with UCD and two with Civil Service), an inter-county National League medal (with Louth), an inter-Provincial Railway Cup medal (Leinster) and a Sigerson's medal (as captain).

== Honours ==
Bohemians

- League of Ireland champions: 1935–36
