= Harry Osman =

English footballer (1911–1998)

Personal information
- Full name: Harry James Osman
- Date of birth: 29 January 1911
- Place of birth: Bentworth, Hampshire, England
- Date of death: 17 December 1998 (aged 87)
- Place of death: Palm Beach, Florida, United States
- Height: 6 ft 0 in (1.83 m)
- Position: Outside left

Youth career
- Okeford United

Senior career*
Years	Team	Apps	(Gls)
1930–1935	Poole Town		
1935–1937	Plymouth Argyle	5	(0)
1937–1939	Southampton	70	(31)
1939–1947	Millwall	34	(3)
1947–1948	Bristol City	18	(1)
1948–1951	Dartford		
1951–1952	Canterbury City		
1952–1953	Winchester City		

Managerial career
- 1951–1952: Canterbury City (Player–manager)
- 1953–1957: Winchester City
- * Club domestic league appearances and goals

Harry James Osman (29 January 1911 – 17 December 1998) was an English footballer who played as an outside left for Southampton for two seasons in the 1930s and went on to become manager of Winchester City where he "discovered" future England international Terry Paine.

== Playing career ==
Osman was born in the village of Bentworth near Alton, Hampshire but moved as a child to Okeford Fitzpaine in Dorset. As a teenager, he played football for Okeford United, before joining Poole Town, playing in the Western League, in 1930.

In December 1935, he joined Plymouth Argyle of the Football League Second Division, where he remained until the summer of 1937. Despite making only five appearances for Plymouth, he had caught the eye of Tom Parker when he was manager of Norwich City. On joining Southampton in 1937, Parker signed Osman from Plymouth, as well as several youngsters from his previous club.

Osman moved back to Hampshire on a free transfer, making his debut for Southampton (in the Football League Second Division) on 28 August 1937, the first day of the 1937–38 season. Osman made an immediate impact, scoring in a 4–3 defeat by Parker's old club. His next goal came on 18 September (against West Ham United) before starting a run of form in October which saw him score eight goals in four games, including a hat-trick in a 6–3 defeat at Luton Town. On Christmas Day 1937, the Saints played a home league match against Swansea Town in which Osman scored to bring the result level at 1–1; this was the last goal scored at The Dell on a Christmas Day. Although Christmas Day fixtures continued on–and–off until 1959, all the Saints' subsequent Christmas Day matches were away from home.

Osman's form continued and he only missed two matches at the end of the season, when he was the Saints' top–scorer with 22 goals (a club record for an outside–left). His form had attracted the attention of bigger clubs, but a reported bid of £7,000 from Birmingham failed to materialise. The following season, Osman continued to play well in an unsettled Southampton side that struggled to maintain any form. Unable to find the exciting form of the previous season, Osman managed only nine goals (from 30 appearances) before he was sold to Second Division rivals Millwall in March 1939 for a fee of £2,000, a move that came as a shock to the Southampton fans, although, in hindsight, this turned out to be a very good piece of business.

His career at Millwall was interrupted by the Second World War. He returned to The Dell as a guest player in War Leagues in 1939–40, before joining the Tank Corps where he was wounded while serving in Italy. After the war, he returned to Millwall making 23 appearances (with three goals) in 1946–47 before transferring to Bristol City in October 1947.

At the end of the 1947–48 season he dropped down to lower league football with spells at Dartford and Canterbury City (where he was appointed player-manager) before returning to Hampshire with Winchester City in 1952.

== Managerial career ==
Osman made a few appearances as a player for Winchester City before taking over as manager in 1953, while also running the Wykeham Arms pub in the city.

In 1955, Osman played a 15-year-old Terry Paine in Winchester City's Hampshire League side. Paine's potential was obvious even at this age and Osman alerted his former Southampton teammate, now Southampton's manager Ted Bates to Paine's potential. Bates had Paine watched and in August 1956, beat Arsenal to his signature.

After retiring from football management in October 1957, Osman emigrated to Palm Beach, Florida where he died on 17 December 1998.
