= Ray Parkin (footballer) =

English footballer

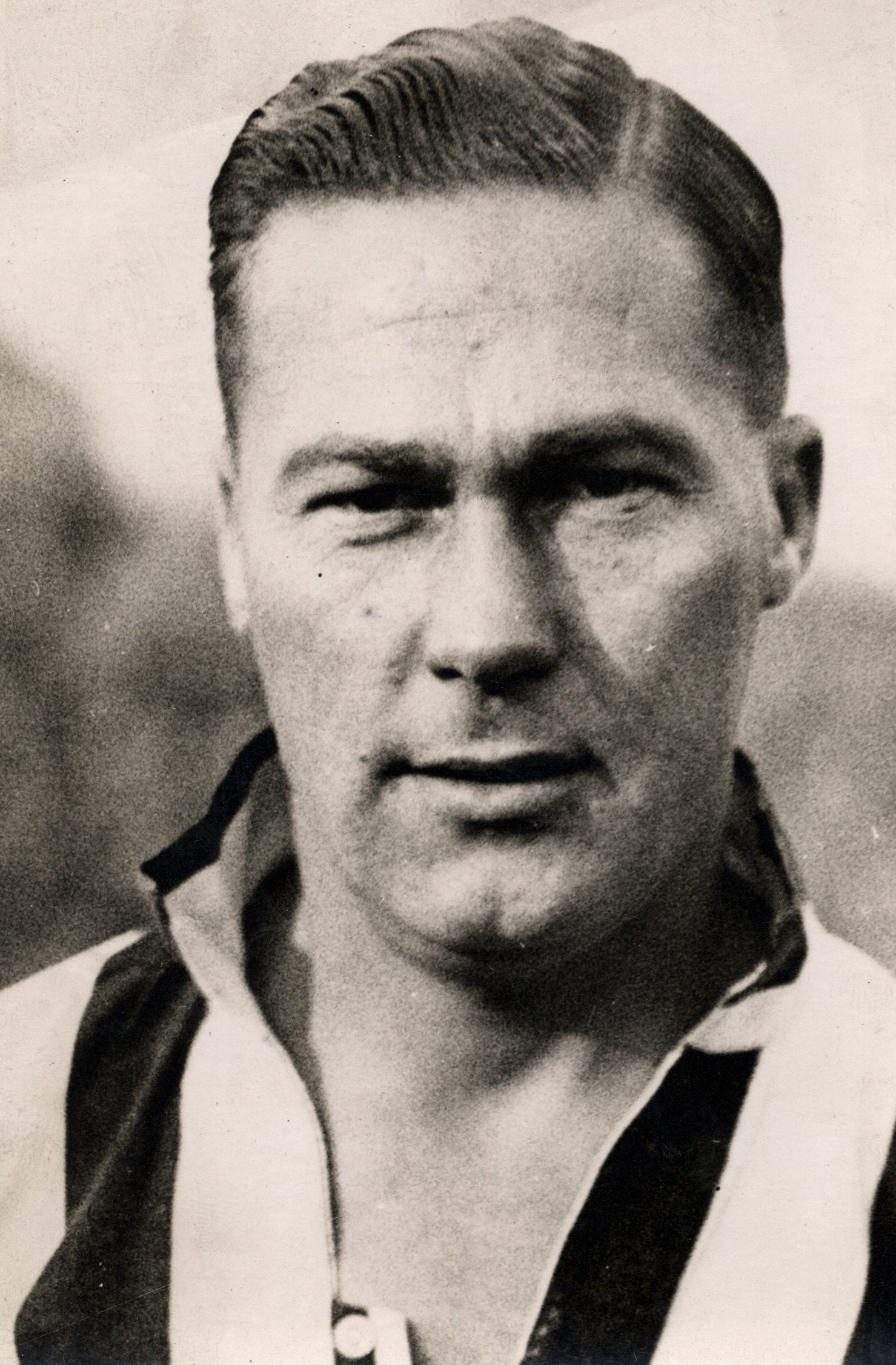

Personal information
- Full name: Raymond Parkin
- Date of birth: 28 January 1911
- Place of birth: Crook, County Durham, England
- Date of death: 18 July 1971 (aged 60)
- Place of death: Market Bosworth, England
- Height: 5 ft 10 in (1.78 m)
- Positions: Inside right; right half

Youth career
- Esh Winning

Senior career*
Years	Team	Apps	(Gls)
1926–1928	Newcastle United	0	(0)
1928–1936	Arsenal	25	(11)
1936–1937	Middlesbrough	6	(0)
1937–1939	Southampton	56	(10)
Total		87	(21)
- * Club domestic league appearances and goals

Raymond Parkin (28 January 1911 – 18 July 1971) was an English professional footballer who played at inside right and later in his career at right half. He spent a large part of his career at Arsenal, where he played mainly in the reserves, and also appeared for Middlesbrough, before becoming a regular member of Southampton's Second Division side.

== Football career ==
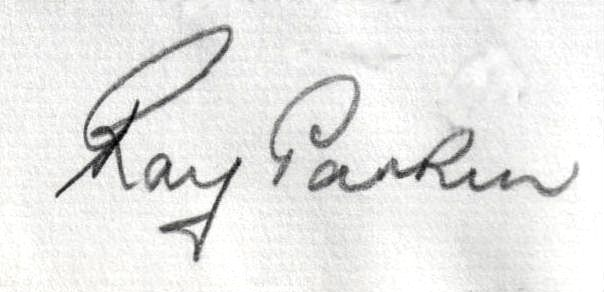
Autograph of Ray Parkin

Parkin was born in Crook, County Durham and played his youth football at Esh Winning before joining Newcastle United as an amateur in October 1926.

He made no first-team appearances for Newcastle and moved south to join First Division Arsenal in February 1928. His Arsenal debut came in a 5–1 defeat at Sunderland on 1 January 1929. He was in and out of the side for the rest of the season and scored his first goals for Arsenal when he netted twice in a 7–1 victory over Bury on 30 March, with David Jack scoring four goals. Despite scoring three goals in five matches in his debut season, Parkin made no first-team appearances in the next two seasons, and it was not until September 1931 that he made another Football League appearance. On 30 January 1932, he scored a hat-trick in a 4–0 victory over Manchester City.

Although Parkin remained with Arsenal until January 1936, he only made eleven appearances in his final four seasons, before being transferred to Middlesbrough for a fee of £2,500. He appeared regularly for Arsenal's reserve team, making 232 appearances and winning the Combination League five times. In his eight years at Highbury, he only made 26 first-team appearances, scoring 11 goals.

After nearly two years at Middlesbrough with only six first-team appearances, he moved in September 1937 for a fee of £1,500 to Southampton, where his former Arsenal teammate, Tom Parker, was manager. Parkin scored on his Saints debut, a 3–3 draw with West Ham United on 18 September. He made 13 appearances at inside right, before losing his place to another new signing, Ted Bates in December. Parkin was recalled to the side in February, and remained in the side for the rest of the season, either at inside right or centre forward.

The following season, Parkin was moved to right half to replace Cyril King, retaining his place for the rest of the season. In September 1939, he played twice before the Football League was abandoned for the Second World War.

== Honours ==
Arsenal

- Football Combination (formerly the London Combination) champions: 1928–29, 1929–30, 1930–31, 1933–34, 1934–35

== World War II and after ==
During the Second World War, "the Board gave permission for Parkin to guest for Holiday Sports". After 1945 he worked in a coalmine not far from Leicester, as an electrician.
