= Tom Parker (footballer, born 1897) =

English footballer and manager

Personal information
- Full name: Thomas Robert Parker
- Date of birth: 19 November 1897
- Place of birth: Woolston, Southampton, England
- Date of death: 1 November 1987 (aged 89)
- Place of death: Southampton, England
- Height: 5 ft 10 in (1.78 m)
- Position: Right back

Senior career*
Years	Team	Apps	(Gls)
1919–1926	Southampton	246	(11)
1926–1933	Arsenal	258	(17)
Total		504	(28)

International career
1925	England	1	(0)

Managerial career
- 1933–1937: Norwich City
- 1937–1943: Southampton
- 1955–1957: Norwich City
- * Club domestic league appearances and goals

Thomas Robert Parker (19 November 1897 – 1 November 1987) was an English footballer and manager. Parker played as a right back for clubs Arsenal and Southampton in his playing career. As a manager he was at the helm of Southampton as well as Norwich City.

== Playing career ==
=== Southampton ===
Born in Woolston, Southampton, Parker began playing with local sides, such as Sholing Rangers and Sholing Athletic, before joining Southern League side Southampton as an amateur in 1918, just before the end of the First World War. In his first season for the Saints, he was playing in the War League and in friendlies, and made a total of 39 appearances, scoring 12 goals, of which 10 were penalties, thus making him the club's second highest scorer behind Bill Rawlings. In 1919, after the end of hostilities, professional football restarted and for the next seven seasons he was a virtual ever-present at right back, forming a successful full-back partnership with Fred Titmuss.

Parker was described in Holley & Chalk's The Alphabet of the Saints as "never the fastest of players, he had wonderful positional sense and his tackling was always well-timed".

Southampton became founder members of the Third Division for the start of the 1920–21 season and were promoted as champions to the Second Division in 1922. Southampton reached the semi-finals of the FA Cup in 1925 but in the match at Stamford Bridge on 28 March 1925 they were eliminated by Sheffield United when Parker had a dreadful afternoon, first scoring an own-goal, then suffering a rare miss from the penalty spot (shooting straight at the 'keeper) before a mix-up between him and goalkeeper Tommy Allen gave Sheffield their second goal.

During his time at Southampton, Parker also won a solitary cap for England, against France on 21 May 1925.

Eventually bigger clubs started making overtures towards Southampton for Parker's services. At first these were resisted, but with money needed to finance the purchase of The Dell, Southampton reluctantly accepted an offer of £3,250 from Herbert Chapman's Arsenal in spring 1926, and he was on his way to Highbury. In all he played 275 first-team matches for Southampton, scoring 12 goals (not including his wartime appearances).

=== Arsenal ===
Parker made his Arsenal debut against Blackburn Rovers on 3 April 1926. This was the first match of 172 consecutive first-team matches for Arsenal, a club record that still stands today. Reliable and assured at the back, Parker soon became Arsenal captain, and skippered the club to their first Cup final in the 1926–27 season, which they lost 1–0 to Cardiff City. Parker's luck was better with his next trip to Wembley in 1929–30 as Arsenal beat Huddersfield Town 2–0 and Parker became the first Arsenal captain to lift the FA Cup trophy. He then played in Arsenal's 2–1 victory over Sheffield Wednesday in the Charity Shield at Stamford Bridge in October 1930.

Parker went on to captain Arsenal to their 1930–31 Championship triumph, and the 1931–32 Cup final (which they lost 2–1, controversially, to Newcastle United). Throughout all this time Parker was a near ever-present in the side, missing just six league games in seven seasons with the club. However, by 1932 Parker was nearly 35, and at the start of the 1932–33 season he was replaced at right back by George Male. He made his last appearance in an Arsenal shirt on 8 October 1932 against Derby County, and left the club in 1933 to become manager of Norwich City.

In total, he played 294 matches for Arsenal, scoring 17 goals (the majority of them being penalties, as he was the club's first-choice taker for much of his career). Despite being an FA Cup and League-winning captain, he never won any further England caps to add to the one he picked up at Southampton, with Roy Goodall and Tom Cooper keeping him out of the national side.

== Management career ==
=== Norwich City ===
With Parker as manager, Norwich City won the Third Division South in 1933–34 and thus promotion to the Second Division.

=== Southampton ===
Parker moved back to his old club Southampton in March 1937, taking over from George Goss who had acted as manager since the previous summer without any real success. On his arrival at The Dell, with money available for new players, Parker set about building a side to push for promotion from Division 2. Over two seasons he spent £9,000 on new players, bringing in wingers Harry Osman and Billy Bevis, goalkeeper Sam Warhurst and centre-half Bill Dodgin. The most important signing, however, was when he signed Ted Bates from his former club Norwich City. Bates was later to go on to transform Southampton into a First Division team.

By 1939, Parker had built a settled side but the Second World War soon intervened and put a halt to competitive football, making all Parker's planning wasted. Parker continued as secretary-manager throughout the difficult initial years of the war, fielding sides made up mostly from guest players. In June 1943, after a row with the Saints' board, he resigned his position to take up employment outside football as a ship's surveyor in Southampton Docks with Lloyd's registry.

=== Norwich City (second spell) ===
He later had a second, less successful spell at Norwich in the 1950s which saw the club finish at the bottom of the League.

== After management ==
Parker returned to his job as a ship's surveyor until he retired in 1962. Soon after retirement, he was asked by Ted Bates (who by then was Saints' manager) to take on a part-time scouting role later becoming chief scout, a post he finally relinquished in 1975. He died aged 89 in 1987.

== Honours ==
=== As a player ===
Southampton

- Football League Third Division South: 1921–22

Arsenal

- Football League First Division: 1930–31, 1932–33
- FA Cup: 1929–30; runner-up: 1926–27, 1931–32
- FA Charity Shield: 1930, 1931

=== As a manager ===
Norwich City

- Football League Third Division South: 1933–34
