= Deaths in May 2013 =

The following is a list of notable deaths in May 2013.

Entries for each day are listed alphabetically by surname. A typical entry lists information in the following sequence:

- Name, age, country of citizenship and reason for notability, established cause of death, reference.

== May 2013 ==
=== 1 ===
- Martin Kevan, 66, Kenyan-born Canadian film and voice actor (Far Cry 3) and author, cancer.
- Massimo Mollica, 84, Italian actor and stage director.
- Pierre Pleimelding, 60, French football player (national team) and manager (SAS Épinal, Ivory Coast, FCSR Haguenau).
- Henry Hope Reed Jr., 97, American architecture critic.
- Gregory Rogers, 55, Australian children's book writer, cancer.
- Ruby Stone, 89, American politician, member of the Idaho House of Representatives (1986–2002).
- Stuart Wilde, 66, British writer and metaphysical teacher, heart attack.
- Chob Yodkaew, 78, Thai economist and politician, stroke.

=== 2 ===
- Sir Terence Beckett, 89, British businessman, Director-General of the Confederation of British Industry.
- Marcel Bélanger, 92, Canadian academic.
- Roddy Blackjack, 86, Canadian Little Salmon/Carmacks First Nation elder and chief, architect of Yukon Land Claims agreement.
- Elbert Crawford, 46, American football offensive lineman, heart attack.
- Mihail Dolgan, 85, Moldovan professor.
- Boris Elik, 83, Canadian ice hockey player (Detroit Red Wings).
- Ernie Field, 70, English boxer, cancer.
- Jeff Hanneman, 49, American guitarist (Slayer), liver failure.
- Ken Lippiatt, 93, Australian rules footballer.
- Joseph P. McFadden, 65, American Roman Catholic prelate, Bishop of Harrisburg (since 2010), heart attack.
- Allen McKay, 86, British politician, MP for Penistone (1978–1983) and Barnsley West and Penistone (1983–1992).
- Tancred Melis, 79, South African cricketer.
- Danny Ray Mitchell, 69, American pastor, businessman and politician.
- Dvora Omer, 80, Israeli author, recipient of the Israel Prize (2006).
- Jo Pitt, 34, Scottish paralympic equestrian, pulmonary veno-occlusive disease.
- Bob Rafkin, 69, American singer songwriter, cancer.
- James E. Ramsey, 81, American politician, member of North Carolina House of Representatives (1963–1974), Speaker (1973–1974), complications from a stroke.
- Harry Randall Jr., 86, American politician.
- Sylvester Sanfilippo, 87, American pediatrician.
- Gordon Sherwood, 83, American classical composer.
- Sarabjit Singh, 49, Indian convicted spy, injuries sustained from blunt force trauma.
- Ronald Thresher, 82, English cricketer.
- Ivan Turina, 32, Croatian footballer (AIK Stockholm), cardiac dysrhythmia.
- Selma Urfer, 85, Swiss author and actress.
- Lefteris Voyatzis, 68, Greek theater actor and director, cancer.
- Charles Banks Wilson, 94, American artist.

=== 3 ===
- Mimi Aarden, 89, Dutch operatic mezzo-soprano
- Joe Astroth, 90, American baseball player (Philadelphia/Kansas City Athletics).
- Herbert Blau, 87, American theater director, scholar and theorist, sarcomatoid carcinoma of the chest.
- Cedric Brooks, 70, Jamaican musician (The Skatalites), cardiac arrest.
- Keith Carter, 88, American Olympic silver medalist swimmer (1948).
- Bruno Chersicla, 75, Italian painter and sculptor.
- Walt Clay, 89, American football player.
- Brad Drewett, 54, Australian tennis player and administrator, ATP Executive Chairman (2012–2013), motor neurone disease.
- David Morris Kern, 103, American pharmacist, developed Orajel to fight toothaches.
- Curtis Rouse, 52, American football player (Minnesota Vikings, San Diego Chargers).
- Branko Vukelić, 55, Croatian politician, Minister of Defence (2008–2010), pancreatic cancer.
- Sir David Innes Williams, 93, British paediatric urologist.

=== 4 ===
- Bobbie Banda, 66, American Juaneño elder and activist, stroke.
- Otis Bowen, 95, American politician, Governor of Indiana (1973–1981), Secretary of Health and Human Services (1985–1989).
- Christian de Duve, 95, Belgian cytologist and biochemist, Nobel Prize laureate (1974), euthanasia.
- Javier Diez Canseco, 65, Peruvian politician and sociologist, MP (1995–2000, 2001–2006, since 2011), pancreatic cancer.
- Frederic Franklin, 98, British-born American ballet dancer and director, complications from pneumonia.
- Sylvi Keskinen, 79, Finnish Olympic hurdler.
- Ed Kringstad, 76, American politician, member of the North Dakota Senate (1995–2006).
- Len Legault, 80, Canadian Football League player.
- Alton Lemon, 84, American civil rights activist, Alzheimer's disease.
- Fredric Lieberman, American ethnomusicologist, composer, music professor, and author, cardiac arrest.
- Mario Machado, 78, American news anchor, journalist and actor (Scarface, RoboCop, St. Elmo's Fire), Parkinson's disease.
- Jack Makari, 95, Lebanese-American cancer immunologist.
- Sir Morgan Morgan-Giles, 98, British Royal Navy officer and politician, MP for Winchester (1964–1979).
- David Noriega Rodríguez, 68, Puerto Rican politician and lawyer, member of the House of Representatives (1984–1996), pancreatic cancer.
- César Portillo de la Luz, 90, Cuban Filin composer and interpreter.
- Arquímedes Puccio, 83, Argentinian gang leader and serial killer (Puccio family), stroke.
- Jacques Stockman, 74, Belgian footballer (R.S.C. Anderlecht).
- John Swaim, 64, American attorney, Pennsylvania state legislator.
- Wilbur Zelinsky, 91, American cultural geographer.

=== 5 ===
- Jürg Amann, 65, Swiss author and dramatist.
- Alan Arnell, 79, English footballer (Liverpool).
- Sir Richard Barratt, 84, British police officer, Chief Inspector of Constabulary (1987–1990).
- Peter Curtis, 83, Australian public servant and diplomat.
- Lotfi Dziri, 67, Tunisian actor.
- Rossella Falk, 86, Italian actress (8½, Modesty Blaise, The Legend of Lylah Clare).
- William Havens, 94, American Olympic canoer (1948).
- Grady Hunt, 91, American costume designer.
- Dean Jeffries, 80, American car customizer, painter and stuntman (The Fugitive, Fletch).
- Mazin Abu Kalal, Iraqi politician, bombing.
- Sarah Kirsch, 78, German poet.
- G. X. McSherry, 88, American politician, member of the New Mexico House of Representatives (1982–1998).
- Tore Magnussen, 74, Norwegian boxer.
- Eugene Millerick, 88, American politician, member of the Connecticut House of Representatives (1986–1994).
- Bill Orr, 78, American insurance executive, First Gentleman of Nebraska (1987–1991), COPD.
- Leif Preus, 85, Norwegian photographer, founder of the Preus Museum.
- Greg Quill, 66, Australian roots musician and entertainment critic (Toronto Star), pneumonia.
- Robert Ressler, 76, American criminologist.
- Hayri Sezgin, 52, Turkish Olympic wrestler.
- Peu Sousa, 35, Brazilian guitarist (Nove Mil Anjos, Pitty) and record producer, suicide by hanging.
- Dirk Vekeman, 52, Belgian footballer (RSC Anderlecht).
- Helmin Wiels, 54, Curaçaoan politician, leader of Pueblo Soberano in the Estates of Curaçao (since 2010), shot.
- Menachem Yedid, 95, Israeli politician, member of the Knesset (1965–1977).

=== 6 ===
- Diana Keppel, Dowager Countess of Albemarle, 103, British aristocrat.
- Giulio Andreotti, 94, Italian politician, Prime Minister (1972–1973, 1976–1979, 1989–1992), Minister of Foreign Affairs (1983–1989) and Lifetime Senator (since 1991).
- Yordan Angelov, 59, Bulgarian Olympic silver medallist volleyball player (1980).
- Severo Aparicio Quispe, 89, Peruvian Roman Catholic prelate, Auxiliary Bishop of Cuzco (1978–1999).
- Steve Carney, 55, English footballer (Newcastle United), pancreatic cancer.
- Jānis Eglītis, 52, Latvian politician.
- Fatima Grimm, 78, German translator, author and speaker.
- Michel Knuysen, 83, Belgian Olympic silver medallist rower (1952).
- Ian MacLeod, 53, Scottish footballer (Motherwell).
- Esperanza Magaz, 91, Cuban-born Venezuelan television actress (RCTV), cancer.
- Steve Martland, 58, English composer, heart attack.
- Arnaldo Ninchi, 77, Italian actor, voice actor and basketball player.
- Michelangelo Spensieri, 64, Canadian politician and lawyer, member of the Legislative Assembly of Ontario for Yorkview (1981–1985).
- Anne-Lise Stern, 91, French psychoanalyst and Holocaust survivor.
- Yang Tzuo-chow, 84, Taiwanese politician, MLY (1999–2002).

=== 7 ===
- Al Fritz, 88, American bicycle developer and inventor (Schwinn Sting-Ray), complications from a stroke.
- Ray Harryhausen, 92, American stop-motion animator (Jason and the Argonauts, Clash of the Titans, The 7th Voyage of Sinbad).
- Kozo Igarashi, 87, Japanese politician, member of the House of Representatives, Chief Cabinet Secretary (1994–1995), pneumonia.
- Balbino Jaramillo, 61, Colombian Olympic cyclist.
- Gunnel Johansson, 90, Swedish artistic gymnast.
- Joseba Larrinaga, 45, Spanish Paralympic athlete, traffic collision.
- P. G. Lim, 96, British-born Malaysian diplomat and lawyer, Ambassador to the United Nations, Yugoslavia, Austria and the European Economic Community.
- Ferruccio Mazzola, 65, Italian football player and manager.
- Teri Moïse, 43, American singer, suicide.
- Mark Perakh, 88, American scientist and blogger.
- Peter Rauhofer, 48, Austrian DJ, remixer and record producer, Grammy Award (2000), brain cancer.
- Romanthony, 45, American DJ, record producer and singer ("One More Time", "Make This Love Right"), complications from kidney disease.
- Herbert Romerstein, 82, American anti–communist writer.
- Mairuth Sarsfield, 88, Canadian broadcaster and author (No Crystal Stair).
- George Sauer Jr., 69, American football player (New York Jets), heart failure.
- Terezo, 59, Brazilian Olympic footballer.
- Wiktor Tołkin, 91, Polish sculptor and architect.
- Jan Villerius, 74, Dutch footballer, cancer.
- Aubrey Woods, 85, British actor (Doctor Who, Willy Wonka and the Chocolate Factory).

=== 8 ===
- Dan Adkins, 76, American comic book artist (The Avengers, Doctor Strange, X-Men).
- Jeanne Cooper, 84, American actress (The Young and the Restless).
- Zia Fariduddin Dagar, 80, Indian dhrupad vocalist, musician and maestro.
- Bryan Forbes, 86, British actor (The League of Gentlemen), film director (The Stepford Wives) and screenwriter (Chaplin).
- Ralph Homan, 84, American politician, member of the South Dakota House of Representatives (1983–1986).
- Brita Malmer, 87, Swedish numismatist.
- Taylor Mead, 88, American writer and actor (Coffee and Cigarettes), stroke.
- Juan José Muñoz, 62, Argentine businessman, President of Gimnasia y Esgrima La Plata, renal failure.
- André Sana, 92, Iraqi Chaldean Catholic hierarch, Archbishop of Kirkuk (1977–2003).
- Asaph Schwapp, 26, American football player (Hartford Colonials), non-Hodgkin's lymphoma.
- Hugh J. Silverman, 67, American philosopher, cancer.
- Géza Vermes, 88, Hungarian-born British theologian and Dead Sea Scrolls scholar, cancer.
- Ken Whaley, 67, British rock musician (Man, Ducks Deluxe, Help Yourself), lung cancer.
- Dallas Willard, 77, American author and philosopher, cancer.
- Ernie Winchester, 68, Scottish footballer.

=== 9 ===
- Alan Abelson, 87, American financial writer, editor and columnist (Barron's), heart attack.
- Fred Ashton, 82, American politician, Mayor of Easton, Pennsylvania (1968–1976).
- Ramón Blanco, 61, Spanish football player and manager (RCD Mallorca, Cadiz), cerebral infarction.
- Grete Dollitz, 88, German–born American radio presenter and classical guitarist.
- Sanaullah Haq, 52, Pakistani convict, beaten.
- Patterson Hume, 90, Canadian professor and science educator.
- Bonnie Huy, 77, American politician, member of the Kansas House of Representatives (2001–2006).
- Alfredo Landa, 80, Spanish actor, Alzheimer's disease.
- George M. Leader, 95, American politician, Governor of Pennsylvania (1955–1959).
- Humberto Lugo Gil, 79, Mexican politician, Governor of Hidalgo (1998–1999).
- Dave Lyon, 74, Canadian Olympic track and field coach (1984, 1988, 1992, 2000).
- Ottavio Missoni, 92, Italian fashion designer and Olympic hurdler (1948).
- Paul Tangi Mhova Mkondo, 67, Zimbabwean businessman, cancer.
- Huguette Oligny, 91, Canadian theatre actress.
- Malcolm Shabazz, 28, American Islamist, grandson of Malcolm X, beaten.
- Andrew Simpson, 36, British Olympic champion sailor (2008, 2012), catamaran capsize.
- Joseph A. Steger, 76, American psychologist and academic, President of the University of Cincinnati (1984–2003).
- Julia Tashjian, 74, American politician, Secretary of the State of Connecticut (1983–1991), heart attack.
- Sadegh Tirafkan, 47, Iranian contemporary artist, brain cancer.
- Ron Weaver, 75, American Emmy Award-winning television producer (The Bold and the Beautiful, Sesame Street).

=== 10 ===
- Félix Agramont Cota, 95, Mexican politician and agricultural engineer, first Governor of Baja California Sur (1970–1975), myocardial infarction.
- Barbara Brenner, 61, American health activist, executive director of Breast Cancer Action (1993–2010), amyotrophic lateral sclerosis.
- Sir John Bush, 98, British Royal Navy admiral, Commander-in-Chief Western Fleet (1967–1970).
- Barbara Callcott, 66, Australian actress, cancer.
- Malcolm Clarke, 82, British marine biologist.
- Jean Delobel, 80, French politician.
- Vincent Dowling, 83, Irish actor and theatre director (The Playboy of the Western World), complications following surgery.
- Laurence Haddon, 90, American actor (Mary Hartman, Mary Hartman, Dallas, Knots Landing), Lewy body disease.
- Brigitte Kiesler, 88, German Olympic gymnast.
- Aleksey Komarov, 91, Russian Olympic rower (1952).
- Boicho Kokinov, 52, Bulgarian cognitive scientist.
- Hugh Mackay, 14th Lord Reay, 75, British peer, Member of the European Parliament (1973–1979), member of the House of Lords (since 1964).
- Philippe Malivoire, 70, French rower.
- Per Maurseth, 80, Norwegian historian and politician.
- Malcolm Parkes, 83, English academic.
- John Shea Jr., 84, American politician, member of the Connecticut House of Representatives (1961–1962).
- Wanade, 71, Kenyan television actress, cancer.
- Al-Haj Suliman Yari, 76, Afghan politician.

=== 11 ===
- Johnny Bos, 61, American boxer and author, heart failure.
- Jack Butler, 85, American Hall of Fame football player (Pittsburgh Steelers), complications from a staph infection.
- Emmanuelle Claret, 44, French biathlete, world champion (1996), leukemia.
- Mike Davison, 67, American baseball player (San Francisco Giants).
- Joe Farman, 82, British physicist, identified ozone hole.
- Marianne Ferber, 90, Czech-born American feminist economist and author.
- Doug Finley, 66, Canadian politician, Senator for Ontario (since 2009), Campaign Director during the 2006 and 2008 elections, colorectal cancer.
- Ollie Mitchell, 86, American big band musician (The Wrecking Crew and original member of Herb Alpert's Tijuana Brass), cancer.
- Arnold Peters, 87, British actor (The Archers), complications from Alzheimer's disease.
- Lenny Yochim, 84, American baseball player (Pittsburgh Pirates), heart failure.

=== 12 ===
- Judit Ágoston-Mendelényi, 76, Hungarian Olympic champion fencer (1964).
- Samuel Aguilar, 80, Paraguayan footballer.
- Sergei Alexeyev, 88, Russian politician, author of the Constitution of Russia, heart attack.
- Daisy Avellana, 96, Filipino stage actor and director, National Artist of the Philippines for Theater and Film.
- Doug Beasy, 83, Australian football player (Carlton).
- Olaf B. Bjørnstad, 82, Norwegian ski jumper.
- José García, 82, Chilean Olympic footballer.
- George William Gray, 86, British scientist, recipient of the 1995 Kyoto Prize for Advanced Technology.
- Mr. Kenneth, 86, American hairdresser (Jacqueline Kennedy, Marilyn Monroe), recipient of the Coty Award (1961).
- Gerd Langguth, 66, German politician and political scientist.
- Daniel W. LeBlanc, 82, American judge, member of Louisiana Court of Appeals, cancer.
- Toni Linhart, 70, Austrian-born American football player (Baltimore Colts), cancer.
- Julian Malonso, 89, Filipino military man, educator and sports executive, lingering illness.
- Bill Miles, 82, American documentary filmmaker.
- Félix Ramananarivo, 78, Malagasy Roman Catholic prelate, Bishop of Antsirabe (1994–2009).
- Francesco Renda, 91, Italian historian and politician.
- Constantino Romero, 65, Spanish voice actor, television and radio host, motor neuron disease.
- K. Bikram Singh, 75, Indian filmmaker, complications from liver failure.
- Max Stadler, 64, German politician, member of the Bundestag (since 1994).
- Kenneth Waltz, 88, American political scientist.
- Peter Worthington, 86, Canadian journalist (Toronto Telegram) and editor-in-chief (Toronto Sun).

=== 13 ===
- Hedda Bolgar, 103, American psychoanalyst.
- André Bord, 90, French politician, Veterans Minister (1972–1974), President of the Alsace Regional Council (1973–1977).
- Joyce Brothers, 85, American psychologist, newspaper columnist, and actress (Loaded Weapon 1, Spy Hard), respiratory failure.
- André Denys, 65, Belgian politician, Governor of East Flanders (2004–2013).
- Dave Everett, 51, Australian criminal, cancer.
- Otto Herrigel, 75, Namibian politician, cancer.
- Enio Iommi, 87, Argentinian sculptor.
- Jill Kitson, 74, Australian radio broadcaster and literary journalist.
- Kennett Love, 88, American journalist (The New York Times), respiratory failure.
- Luciano Lutring, 75, Italian criminal, painter and author.
- Jagdish Mali, 59, Indian fashion photographer, multiple organ failure.
- Chuck Muncie, 60, American football player (New Orleans Saints, San Diego Chargers), heart attack.
- Daniel Offer, 83, American psychiatrist.
- Sir Ellison Pogo, 66, Solomon Islands Anglican primate, Archbishop of Melanesia (1994–2008), lymphoma.
- Lilo Ramdohr, 99, German Resistance fighter, member of the White Rose.
- Vladimir Romanovsky, 56, Soviet Olympic sprint canoer (Gold and silver medallist).
- Derrick Thomas, 69, British agricultural researcher, cancer.
- Fyodor Tuvin, 39, Russian footballer.
- Lynne Woolstencroft, 69, Canadian politician, Mayor of Waterloo, Ontario (2000–2003), cancer.

=== 14 ===
- Jerry Ayres, 76, American actor.
- Joy Baluch, 80, Australian politician, Mayor of Port Augusta (1981–1993, since 1995).
- Wayne Brown, 76, American politician, Mayor of Mesa, Arizona (1996–2000).
- Arsen Chilingaryan, 47, Armenian football player and manager.
- Asghar Ali Engineer, 74, Indian writer and activist.
- Billie Sol Estes, 88, American businessman and convicted con man.
- Ray Guy, 74, Canadian humorist, writer and journalist, cancer.
- Mohammad Ezodin Hosseini Zanjani, 92, Iranian Islamic prelate, Grand Ayatollah, complications from surgery.
- Marian Jeżak, 84, Polish ice hockey player.
- Margaret Rayburn, 86, American politician, member of the Washington House of Representatives (1985–1995).
- Sardar Arif Shahid, Pakistani Kashmiri politician, shot.
- Harvansh Singh, 64, Indian politician, Madhya Pradesh MLA for Keolari (since 1993), cardiac arrest.
- Ingrid Visser, 35, Dutch Olympic volleyball player (1996), homicide.
- Lubomír Zajíček, 67, Czech Olympic bronze medallist volleyball player (1968).

=== 15 ===
- Nasser al-Rashed, 20, Kuwaiti squash player, heart attack.
- Noelle Barker, 84, British soprano and singing teacher.
- Paddy Buggy, 84, Irish hurler (Kilkenny) and sport executive, President of the GAA (1982–1985).
- Linden Chiles, 80, American actor (Quincy, M.E., Barnaby Jones, Perry Mason), fall.
- Raul Gonzalez, 78, Filipino journalist, Press Secretary for Diosdado Macapagal (1961–1965), cancer.
- Robert Hunt, 77, British police officer.
- Gábor Gellért Kis, 66, Hungarian journalist, MP for Monor (1994–1998).
- Albert Lance, 87, Australian-born French opera singer.
- Thomas M. Messer, 93, Czechoslovak-born American museum director (Solomon R. Guggenheim Foundation).
- Bill O'Hagan, 68, British journalist and sausage maker.
- Jens Elmegård Rasmussen, 69, Danish linguist and Indo-Europeanist.
- Billy Raymond, 75, Scottish-born Australian entertainer, lung cancer.
- Henrique Rosa, 67, Bissau-Guinean politician, Acting President (2003–2005), lung cancer.
- James Stuart-Smith, 93, British judge and army officer, Advocate General of the Armed Forces (1984–1991).
- Darrell Tryon, 70, New Zealand linguistics professor and Pacific Islands language specialist, melanoma.
- Fred White, 76, American sports broadcaster (Kansas City Royals), complications from melanoma.
- Harold Whitfield, 94, South African cricketer.

=== 16 ===
- Richard Andriamanjato, 82, Malagasy politician.
- Carl Bennett, 97, American basketball executive, coach and GM of Detroit Pistons.
- Félix Bonnat, 92, French bobsledder.
- Kristen Kyrre Bremer, 87, Norwegian theologian and bishop.
- Mario Brescia Cafferata, 83, Peruvian billionaire financial and industrial executive.
- Angelo Errichetti, 84, American politician, Mayor of Camden, New Jersey (1973–1981); member of the New Jersey Senate (1976–1981).
- Fiona Gore, Countess of Arran, 94, Scottish powerboating racer.
- Geoffrey Gowan, 83, Canadian sports broadcaster (CBC) and executive (CAC), Parkinson's disease.
- Frank Nigel Hepper, 84, English botanist.
- Bryan Illerbrun, 56, Canadian football player (Saskatchewan Roughriders).
- Ivar Kallion, 81, Estonian Communist politician, chairman of the executive committee of Tallinn (1971–1979).
- Valtr Komárek, 82, Czech politician, complications following cardiac surgery.
- Frankie Librán, 65, American Puerto Rican baseball player (San Diego Padres), complications from diabetes.
- Maurice Marshall, 86, New Zealand Olympic middle-distance athlete (1952).
- Heinrich Rohrer, 79, Swiss physicist, Nobel laureate (1986).
- Paul Shane, 72, British actor and comedian (Hi-de-Hi!, You Rang, M'Lord?).
- Max Schirschin, 92, German football player and manager (Rouen, Le Havre, Metz).
- Dick Trickle, 71, American NASCAR driver, suicide by gunshot.
- Bernard Waber, 88, American children's author (Lyle, Lyle, Crocodile), kidney failure.

=== 17 ===
- Dominic Kodwo Andoh, 84, Ghanaian Roman Catholic prelate, Archbishop of Accra (1971–2005), heart-related ailment.
- Philippe Gaumont, 40, French Olympic racing cyclist (1992), heart failure.
- John Goddard, 88, American adventurer, cancer.
- Penne Hackforth-Jones, 63, American-born Australian actress (Mao's Last Dancer), lung cancer.
- Elijah Harper, 64, Canadian Cree politician and band chief, Manitoba MLA for Rupertsland (1981–1992), MP for Churchill (1993–1997), heart failure.
- Jack Hawkins, 96, American Marine Corps officer (Bay of Pigs Invasion).
- Lola Hendricks, 80, American activist.
- Tauatomo Mairau, French Polynesian royal claimant.
- Alan O'Day, 72, American singer-songwriter ("Undercover Angel", "Angie Baby"), brain cancer.
- Jérôme Reehuis, 73, Dutch actor.
- Colin A. Russell, 84, British historian.
- Peter Schulz, 83, German politician, First Mayor of Hamburg (1971–1974).
- Albert Seedman, 94, American police officer.
- Harold Shapero, 93, American composer and pianist (Symphony for Classical Orchestra), complications from pneumonia.
- Taronda Spencer, 54, American archivist, heart attack.
- Sir Rodney Sweetnam, 86, British surgeon, President of the Royal College of Surgeons (1995–1998).
- Anthony Trickett, 73, British doctor, Lord Lieutenant of Orkney (since 2007).
- Don Tonry, 77, American Olympic gymnast.
- Ken Venturi, 82, American golfer and golf analyst, winner of the U.S. Open (1964), World Golf Hall of Fame inductee (2013), multiple infections.
- Jorge Rafael Videla, 87, Argentine military lieutenant general and politician, President (1976–1981), complications from a fall.

=== 18 ===
- Aleksei Balabanov, 54, Russian filmmaker, seizure.
- Jo Benkow, 88, Norwegian writer and politician, President of the Parliament (1985–1993).
- Isabel Benham, 103, American railroad businesswoman.
- Neil Chrisley, 81, American baseball player (Washington Senators, Detroit Tigers).
- Steve Forrest, 87, American actor (Dallas, North Dallas Forty, S.W.A.T).
- Zahra Shahid Hussain, 69, Pakistani politician, shot.
- Marek Jackowski, 66, Polish rock musician (Maanam).
- Ernst Klee, 71, German historian and writer.
- Arthur Malet, 85, English actor (Mary Poppins, Halloween, In the Heat of the Night, Anastasia).
- Max, 29, beagle, dachshund and terrier mix, world's oldest dog, Tonic–clonic seizure.
- David McMillan, 31, American football player (Cleveland Browns), shot.
- Nam Duck-woo, 89, South Korean politician, Prime Minister (1980–1982), testicular cancer.
- Newton Russell, 85, American politician, member of the California State Assembly (1964–1974) and California Senate (1974–1996), lung cancer.
- Lothar Schmid, 85, German chess grandmaster.
- Harold Sossen, 88, American businessman.
- Claramae Turner, 92, American opera singer (Carousel, The Medium).

=== 19 ===
- Sasanka Chandra Bhattacharyya, 94, Indian natural product chemist.
- Leonard Erickson, 66, American oncologist.
- Bella Flores, 84, Filipino actress, complications from hip surgery.
- G. Sarsfield Ford, 79, American judge, member of the Connecticut Supreme Court.
- Michael Kpakala Francis, 77, Liberian Roman Catholic prelate, Archbishop of Monrovia (1981–2011).
- Leonard Harbin, 98, Trinidad cricketer.
- Robin Harrison, 80, Canadian pianist and composer, heart attack.
- Vuyo Mbuli, 46, South African television personality and news presenter, pulmonary embolism.
- Carlo Monni, 69, Italian character actor.
- Murat Öztürk, 60, Turkish aerobatics pilot, plane crash.
- Neil Reynolds, 72, Canadian newspaper editor (The Ottawa Citizen), cancer.
- Mirek Smíšek, 88, Czech-born New Zealand potter.
- Ally Sykes, 86, Tanzanian politician.
- Franklin White, 90, British ballet dancer.
- Alexey Dobrovolsky, 74, Russian ideologue of neo-paganism.

=== 20 ===
- Yohanan Cohen, 95, Israeli politician and diplomat.
- Dave Costa, 71, American football player (Oakland Raiders, Denver Broncos).
- Flavio Costantini, 86, Italian artist.
- Billie Dawe, 88, Canadian ice hockey player.
- Anders Eliasson, 66, Swedish composer.
- Ari Huumonen, 57, Finnish discus thrower.
- Miloslav Kříž, 88, Czech basketball player and coach.
- Ray Manzarek, 74, American rock musician (The Doors), bile duct cancer.
- Jevan Maseko, 70, Zimbabwean military officer, Governor of Matabeleland North Province and ambassador, diabetes and kidney failure.
- Idriss Ndélé Moussa, 54, Chadian politician, President of Pan African Parliament (2009–2012), traffic collision.
- Sir Denys Roberts, 90, British colonial official and judge, Chief Justice of Hong Kong (1979–1988).
- Harry Schuh, 70, American football player (Oakland Raiders, University of Memphis).
- Zach Sobiech, 18, American pop singer and viral video performer, osteosarcoma.
- Dominik Sucheński, 86, Polish Olympic sprinter.
- Haldor Topsøe, 99, Danish civil engineer.

=== 21 ===
- Trevor Bolder, 62, British musician (David Bowie, Uriah Heep), cancer.
- Antoine Bourseiller, 82, French comedian and opera director.
- Eddie Braben, 82, British comedy writer (Morecambe and Wise, Ken Dodd).
- Evelyne Bradley, 88, American Navajo judge, District Court judge (1984–1995).
- Robert Chambers, 59, New Zealand judge, member of the Supreme Court (since 2011).
- Frank Comstock, 90, American composer.
- Cot Deal, 90, American baseball player (Boston Red Sox, St. Louis Cardinals).
- Peter Ellis, 66, Australian football player.
- Zsolt Erőss, 45, Hungarian mountaineer.
- Mick Grambeau, 83, Australian rules footballer.
- Keith Jukes, 59, English Anglican clergyman, Dean of Ripon (since 2007), stomach cancer.
- Harold Long, 72, Canadian politician, British Columbia MLA for Mackenzie (1986–1991) and Powell River-Sunshine Coast (2001–2005), plane crash.
- Louis de Cartier de Marchienne, 91, Belgian baron and businessman.
- Hank Kozloski, 85, American sportswriter.
- Leonard Marsh, 80, American beverage executive, co-founder of Snapple.
- Vernon McGarity, 91, American soldier (Battle of the Bulge), recipient of the Medal of Honor (1946).
- Fred Mitchell, 89, American artist.
- Edna Moyle, 71, Caymanian politician, MLA for North Side (1992–2009), Speaker (2001–2009), cancer.
- Charley Reese, 76, American newspaper columnist, respiratory failure.
- Count Christian of Rosenborg, 70, Danish royal.
- Anand Shetty, 52, Indian sprinter, car accident.
- Mykola Simkaylo, 60, Ukrainian Greek Catholic hierarch, Bishop of Kolomyia – Chernivtsi (since 2005).
- Bob Thompson, 88, American composer and orchestra leader.
- Dominique Venner, 78, French historian, journalist and essayist, suicide by gunshot.

=== 22 ===
- Bill Austin, 84, American football player (New York Giants), coach (Pittsburgh Steelers, Washington Redskins).
- Dick Barry, 87, American politician, member of the Tennessee House of Representatives (1954–1967), Speaker (1963–1967).
- Wayne Cottrell, 69, New Zealand rugby union player.
- Henri Dutilleux, 97, French composer.
- Andrea Gallo, 84, Italian presbyter.
- Brian Greenhoff, 60, English footballer (Manchester United).
- Sarah P. Harkness, 98, American architect.
- Usha Rani Hooja, 90, Indian sculptor.
- William Douglas Lansford, 90, American writer.
- Elizabeth Mavor, 85, British writer.
- Mick McManus, 93, English professional wrestler.
- Wayne F. Miller, 94, American photographer.
- Lawrence Pope, 73, American politician and academic, member of the Iowa House of Representatives (1979–1983), renal cancer.
- Éric Remacle, 52, Belgian scientist.
- Pat Shea, 73, American football player (San Diego Chargers).
- Sigurd Schmidt, 91, Russian historian and ethnographer.
- Richard Thorp, 81, English actor (Emmerdale).
- Ibragim Todashev, 27, Chechen–born American mixed martial artist, shot.
- Teruto Tsubota, 90, American marine (Battle of Okinawa).

=== 23 ===
- John Antonio, 83, American advertising executive, created Clemson University tiger paw logo, cancer.
- William Demby, 90, American writer.
- Dick Evey, 72, American football player (Chicago Bears, University of Tennessee).
- Richard G. Fallon, 89, American academic and theatre director (Asolo Repertory Theatre).
- Lenin Gani, 45, Bangladeshi sports journalist, pulmonary hypertension.
- Epy Guerrero, 71, Dominican Major League Baseball scout (Houston Astros, New York Yankees, Toronto Blue Jays), kidney failure.
- Hazel Hawke, 83, Australian social activist and National Treasure, first wife of Prime Minister Bob Hawke, complications of dementia.
- Harry L. Harris, 86, American politician.
- In Excess, 26, Irish-born American Thoroughbred racehorse. (death announced on this date)
- J. Christopher Jaffe, 85, American acoustical engineer.
- Hayri Kozakçıoğlu, 75, Turkish politician, shot.
- Moritz, Landgrave of Hesse, 86, German prince and Head of the House of Hesse.
- William J. Lashua, 92, American World War II veteran.
- Michael Lev, 95, Ukrainian-born Israeli writer.
- Georges Moustaki, 79, Egyptian-born French singer and songwriter.
- Gerry Peacocke, 81, Australian politician, NSW MLA for Dubbo (1981–1999).
- Flynn Robinson, 72, American basketball player (Los Angeles Lakers, Milwaukee Bucks), multiple myeloma.
- Brian Sternberg, 69, American pole vaulter, quadriplegic complications.
- Jim Zabel, 91, American sports broadcaster (University of Iowa).
- Luis Zuloaga, 90, Venezuelan baseball player (Leones del Caracas).

=== 24 ===
- Françoise Blanchard, 58, French actress (La Morte Vivante).
- Elsa Bornemann, 61, Argentine children's writer.
- Helmut Braunlich, 84, American composer.
- Michel Crozier, 90, French sociologist.
- Ron Davies, 70, Welsh footballer Norwich, Southampton.
- John F. Dolan, 90, American politician.
- Gabriel Fernandez, 8, American child murder victim.
- Gotthard Graubner, 82, German painter.
- Huang Yu, 96, Chinese film director, screenwriter and actor.
- Haynes Johnson, 81, American journalist (The Washington Post, Washington Evening Star), winner of Pulitzer Prize (1966), heart attack.
- Yevgeny Kychanov, 80, Russian orientalist.
- John Lucas, 92, British Army officer.
- Lorene Mann, 76, American country music singer and songwriter.
- Arnoldo Martínez Verdugo, 88, Mexican politician.
- Godwin Mawuru, 52, Zimbabwean filmmaker and television producer, complications from diabetes.
- John Miles, 90, American Negro league baseball player.
- Sir Garth Morrison, 70, British scouter, Chief Scout (1988–1996).
- Ralph Perlman, 96, American public official, Louisiana budget director (1967–1988).
- Antonio Puchades, 87, Spanish footballer (Valencia CF), Alzheimer's disease.
- Ed Shaughnessy, 84, American drummer (The Tonight Show Starring Johnny Carson), heart attack.
- Rob Smith, 61, Australian footballer.
- John Sumner, 88, Australian founder and artistic director of the Melbourne Theatre Company.
- Pyotr Todorovsky, 87, Ukrainian-born Russian film director (Wartime Romance), screenwriter (What a Wonderful Game) and cinematographer, heart attack.
- Tripura, 84, Indian writer.
- Erling Welle-Strand, 96, Norwegian writer and resistance member.

=== 25 ===
- Mohammed Rashad Abdulle, 79, Ethiopian academic.
- Gordon Berg, 85, American politician, member of the North Dakota House of Representatives (1977–1991).
- Harry Birrell, 85, American radio news broadcaster (KNX (AM)), interstitial lung disease.
- Tyrone Brunson, 57, American musician.
- Walt Budko, 87, American basketball player.
- Gene Burns, 72, American political radio broadcaster and food critic, complications from a stroke.
- Paul Cuprowski, 73, American politician, member of the New Jersey General Assembly (1983–1985).
- Larry Johnson, 62, American baseball player.
- Mahendra Karma, 62, Indian political leader, founder of Salwa Judum, shot.
- Jan Kinder, 68, Norwegian Olympic ice hockey player.
- Marshall Lytle, 79, American rock and roll musician (Bill Haley & His Comets), Rock and Roll Hall of Fame inductee (2012), lung cancer.
- Uday Mudliyar, Indian politician, Chhattisgarh MLA for Rajnandgaon (1993–1998), shot.
- Nand Kumar Patel, 59, Indian politician, Chhattisgarh MLA for Kharsia (since 1990), shot.
- Ronald Payne, 87, British journalist and war correspondent.
- T. M. Soundararajan, 91, Indian playback singer.
- Jimmy Wray, 78, British politician, MP for Glasgow Provan (1987–1997) and Glasgow Baillieston (1997–2005).
- Lewis Yocum, 66, American orthopedist, specialist in Tommy John surgery, liver cancer.

=== 26 ===
- Ray Barnhart, 85, American businessman and politician, Director of the Federal Highway Administration (1981–1987).
- John Bierwirth, 89, American aircraft executive, Chairman of Grumman (1972–1988).
- Roberto Civita, 76, Italian-born Brazilian businessman, CEO of Grupo Abril, heart failure.
- Mbuya Dyoko, 68, Zimbabwean musician, cirrhosis.
- Héctor Garza, 43, Mexican professional wrestler, lung cancer.
- Graham Leggett, 92, British RAF squadron leader, youngest surviving pilot of the Battle of Britain.
- Tom Lichtenberg, 72, American football coach (University of Maine, Ohio University), cancer.
- Charles M. McGowan, 89, American politician, member of the Massachusetts House of Representatives (1968–1978).
- Otto Muehl, 87, Austrian painter and activist, Parkinson's disease and cardiac ailment.
- José María Pérez Gay, 70, Mexican journalist, academic and diplomat, Ambassador to Portugal, National Journalism Prize (1996).
- Happy Pieterse, 70, South African boxer, complications of diabetes.
- Martha Nelson Thomas, 62, American folk artist, ovarian cancer.
- Jack Vance, 96, American science fiction author.

=== 27 ===
- György Bárdy, 92, Hungarian actor.
- Jean Bach, 94, American filmmaker (A Great Day in Harlem).
- Nazmiye Demirel, 86, Turkish first lady, wife of Süleyman Demirel, Alzheimer's disease.
- Cullen Finnerty, 30, American football player, pneumonia (Grand Valley State University).
- Steven Klepper, 64, American economist.
- Muttanisseril Koyakutty, 86, Indian Islamic scholar and writer.
- Little Tony, 72, Italian-born Sammarinese pop singer and actor, lung cancer.
- Jagjit Singh Lyallpuri, 96, Indian politician.
- Bill Pertwee, 86, British radio and television actor (Dad's Army, You Rang, M'Lord?) and author.
- Abdoulaye Sékou Sow, 83, Malian politician, Prime Minister (1993–1994).
- Giacomo Soffiantino, 84, Italian painter and artist.
- Beverley Taylor Sorenson, 89, American education philanthropist.

=== 28 ===
- Silvério Paulo de Albuquerque, 96, Brazilian Roman Catholic prelate, Bishop of Caetité (1970–1973) and Feira de Santana (1973–1995).
- Eddi Arent, 88, German actor.
- Nino Bibbia, 91, Italian Olympic skeleton racer and bobsledder (1948).
- Robert Chalmers, 67, South African cricketer.
- Abigail Heyman, 70, American feminist journalist, heart failure.
- Viktor Kulikov, 91, Russian military officer, Marshal of the Soviet Union (1977), Warsaw Pact commander-in-chief (1977–1989).
- R. Travis Osborne, 99, American psychologist and professor emeritus.
- Fotis Polymeris, 93, Greek musician.
- William Earl Reid, 78, Canadian politician, Minister of Tourism for British Columbia (1986–1989).
- Eddie Romero, 88, Filipino film director, blood clot and prostate cancer.
- Gerd Schmückle, 95, German general.
- Caesar Trunzo, 87, American politician, member of the New York Senate (1972–2008).
- Masuko Ushioda, 71, Japanese violinist, acute leukemia.

=== 29 ===
- Werner Andermatt, 96, Swiss painter.
- Ramón Aguirre Suárez, 68, Argentine footballer (Estudiantes de La Plata).
- Richard Ballantine, 72, British cycling writer.
- Nino Baragli, 88, Italian film editor (The Good, the Bad and the Ugly, Once Upon a Time in the West).
- Donald Bevan, 93, American author.
- Mike Carrell, 69, American politician, member of the Washington House (1994–2004) and Washington State Senate (since 2004), myelodysplastic syndrome.
- Juan Américo Díaz, 68, Bolivian footballer.
- Jabulani Dube, Zimbabwean politician, MP-elect for Insiza South.
- Andrew Greeley, 85, American Roman Catholic priest, author (The Cardinal Sins) and columnist (Chicago Sun-Times), complications from skull fracture.
- Mamman Kontagora, 69, Nigerian military officer and politician.
- Cliff Meely, 65, American basketball player (University of Colorado, Houston Rockets), blood infection.
- Mulgrew Miller, 57, American jazz pianist, stroke.
- Henry Morgentaler, 90, Polish-born Canadian physician, abortion advocate, Holocaust survivor, heart attack.
- Franca Rame, 83, Italian theatre actress, playwright, political activist, and wife of Dario Fo.
- Dame Margaret Shields, 71, New Zealand politician, MP for Kapiti (1981–1990), dementia and Parkinson's disease.
- Ludwig G. Strauss, 63, German physician and academic, cancer.
- Wali-ur-Rehman, 42, Pakistani Taliban militant, military action.

=== 30 ===
- Dean Brooks, 96, American physician and actor (One Flew Over the Cuckoo's Nest).
- Elliot del Borgo, 74, American composer.
- Michael Baillie, 3rd Baron Burton, 88, British aristocrat.
- Harold A. Carter, 76, American pastor, cancer.
- Güzin Dino, 102, Turkish literary scholar.
- Raymond Evans, 92, United States Coast Guardsman.
- Rituparno Ghosh, 49, Indian filmmaker, cardiac arrest.
- Ted Gorin, 89, Welsh professional footballer.
- Helen Hanft, 79, American actress (Manhattan), intestinal complications.
- Arquímedes Herrera, 77, Venezuelan Olympic track and field athlete (1964).
- Tamás Homonnay, 87, Hungarian Olympic athlete.
- Jayalath Jayawardena, 59, Sri Lankan politician, physician and human rights campaigner, heart disease.
- Larry Jones, 79, American football player and coach (Florida State University, 1971–1973).
- Kyprianos Koutsoumpas, 78, Greek Orthodox hierarch, Metropolitan of Oropos and Fili, President of Synod of the Old Calendarist Church of Greece, stroke.
- Vina Mazumdar, 86, Indian academic and women's activist, lung tumour.
- Andrzej Nowak, 57, Polish ice hockey player.
- Péter Szilágyi, 59, Hungarian conductor and politician, MP for Berettyóújfalu (1994–2002).

=== 31 ===
- Mufti Abdullah, 82, Pakistani politician, Gilgit-Baltistan MLA for Khaplu.
- Eelco van Asperen, 48, Dutch computer scientist.
- Jeff Berry, 64, American Knights of the Ku Klux Klan leader, lung cancer.
- Gerald E. Brown, 86, American theoretical physicist.
- Elvin Feltner, 83, American broadcaster and film producer (Carnival Magic).
- Abir Goswami, 38, Indian television actor, heart attack.
- Tommy Henderson, 85, English footballer (Burnley F.C.).
- Jeffrey Hunker, 56, American cyber security expert and academic.
- Frederic Lindsay, 79, Scottish novelist.
- Miguel Méndez, 82, American author.
- Jairo Mora, 26, Costa Rican environmentalist, shot.
- Richie Phillips, 72, American baseball umpire union official, cardiac arrest.
- Marta Romero, 85, American Puerto Rican actress and singer.
- Tim Samaras, 55, American tornado chaser (Storm Chasers, TWISTEX), crushed vehicle tornado injuries.
- Jean Stapleton, 90, American actress (All in the Family, You've Got Mail, Michael), Emmy winner (1971, 1972, 1978).
