= Birrell =

Birrell is an English surname. Notable people with the surname include:

- Adrian Birrell (born 1960), South African cricket player and coach
- Alec Birrell (1885–1948), Australian footballer
- Augustine Birrell (1850–1933), English politician, barrister, academic and author
- Billy Birrell (1897–1968), Scottish football player and manager
- Bob Birrell (footballer) (1890–1956), Scottish footballer
- Frederick Ronald Birrell (1913–1985), South Australian unionist and MHR
- Frederick William Birrell (1869–1939), South Australian typographer and MLA
- Gerry Birrell (1944–1973), Scottish racing driver
- Harry Birrell (1928–2013), American news reporter
- Harry Birrell (cricketer) (1927–2003), South African cricketer and schoolmaster
- James Birrell (1928–2019), Australian architect from Queensland
- John Birrell (1815–1875), railway entrepreneur
- Kimberly Birrell (born 1998), Australian tennis player
- Mark Birrell (born 1958), solicitor, director, Cabinet Minister in Victoria, Australia
- Niki Birrell (born 1986), British Paralympic sailor
- Peter Birrell (born 1941), British musician, Freddie and the Dreamers
- Willie Birrell (1893–1968), Scottish footballer
