= George Makari =

Historian, psychiatrist, and psychoanalyst

George Jack Makari
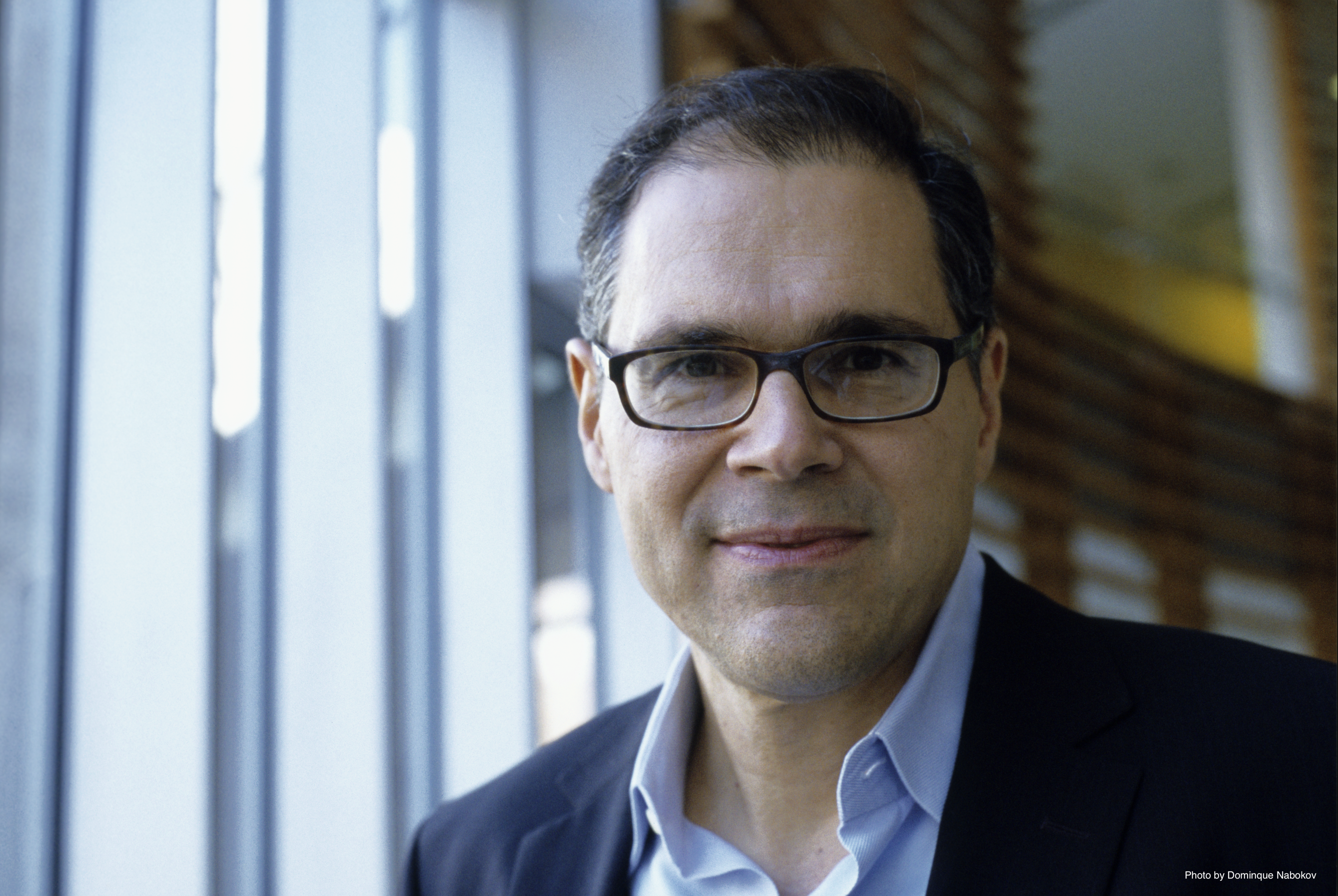
- Education: Brown University (BA); Cornell University Medical College (MD)
- Notable work: Revolution in Mind (2008); Soul Machine (2015); Of Fear and Strangers (2021)
- Website: www.georgemakari.com

George Jack Makari is a psychiatrist and historian. He serves as director of the DeWitt Wallace Institute of Psychiatry: History, Policy, and the Arts, which encompasses the Oskar Diethelm Library at Weill Cornell Medical College, where he is also a Professor of Psychiatry. Makari's work has been widely reviewed, and he is well known among historians of the mind sciences, psychiatry, and psychoanalysis for Revolution in Mind, The Creation of Psychoanalysis and Soul Machine: The Invention of the Modern Mind. His recent work, Of Fear and Strangers: A History of Xenophobia, won the 87th annual Anisfield-Wolf Book Award in the nonfiction category. He was the Director and Attending Psychiatrist of a sliding scale Psychotherapy Clinic at Payne Whitney Clinic from 1991-2016.

== Education ==
Makari received his bachelor's degree in 1982 from Brown University and his M.D. in 1987 from the Medical College of Cornell University. Makari did his psychiatric residency at Cornell's Payne Whitney Psychiatric Clinic in Manhattan, and then received a fellowship (De Witt Wallace/Reader's Digest Research Fellow) at the Department of Psychiatry at Cornell's Medical College. In 1997, Makari completed his psychoanalytic training at the Columbia University Center for Psychoanalytic Training and Research. In 2017, he was awarded the Benjamin Rush Award by the American Psychiatric Association for his body of work.

== DeWitt Wallace Institute of Psychiatry ==
The institute's mission, since its founding in 1958, has been to support and carry out historical scholarship that is relevant to the contemporary theory and practice of psychiatry. In 1996 Makari became the director of an historical research institute in the Department of Psychiatry at Weill Cornell Medical College. Under Makari's leadership the Institute has greatly expanded. In 1994 he worked with benefactors to establish the Richardson Seminars on the History of Psychiatry, and a year later, he inaugurated the Eric T. Carlson Memorial Grand Rounds in memory of the institute's founding director. He oversaw the modernization of the Oskar Diethelm Library, a world-renowned archival resource for the history of psychiatry.

Makari has led the Institute toward diversifying its programming to include explorations of the arts, mental health policy, the mind sciences, and the humanities. In 2009 the Institute was rechristened as DeWitt Wallace Institute for the History of Psychiatry in recognition of the philanthropic support of the Wallace Foundation. In 2020, to represent this range of scholarly, educational, and archival activities, the institute was renamed the DeWitt Wallace Institute of Psychiatry: History, Policy, and the Arts.

== Revolution in Mind ==
In his 2008 Revolution in Mind, Makari argues that the creation of psychoanalysis (as both a body of ideas and a movement) can be best understood by focusing on the way psychoanalytics and psychoanalytic communities were created, broken apart, and then rebuilt in the period before World War II. Specifically, Makari declares that early psychoanalytic theory emerged from Sigmund Freud's engagements with French psychopathology, biophysics, psychophysics, and sexology. Accordingly, he writes, Freudian theory was essentially a synthesis, one which quickly drew interest from Freud's contemporaries, many of whom coalesced around him and in the process developed the first psychoanalytic community. However, this community proved fragile.

According to Makari, the period that followed the Nuremberg Congress of 1910 saw a series of schisms, both theoretical and interpersonal, which shattered the Freudian movement and forced early analysts to rethink their work and professional networks. This 'rethinking' resulted in the creation of a variety of new psychoanalytic communities that were more independent of Freud, both conceptually and geographically. These communities placed less emphasis on Freud's personal authority and theories, and instead sought to bind their members with a commitment to shared technique, increased empiricism, and a process of professionalization. Eventually, Makari argues, the rise of fascism led to the destruction of most European psychoanalytic communities, sparking battles for control in the two major psychoanalytic centers that remained: London and New York.

== Soul Machine ==
In Soul Machine (2015), Makari turns to the Enlightenment to historicize the creation of the Western mind. The book recounts the story of how the mind—an emerging concept—evolved as a potential solution to questions about the nature of inner life. These questions, which reached back to the origins of modernity, stemmed from the crisis in religious authority and the scientific revolution. The "mind" supplied a possible answer that was, as Makari notes, "part soul and part machine but fully neither."

The book is a synthetic history of the mind and the emergence of psychological man in the West World. It was rated one of the Best Books of 2016 by author Andrew Solomon in The Guardian and was called "brilliant" and "essential reading" by the Wall Street Journal.

== Of Fear and Strangers: A History of Xenophobia ==
Published by W.W. Norton & Company in 2021, this book traces the history of xenophobia, chronicling its conceptualization since the term was coined in the late-nineteenth century. Makari investigates the evolution of xenophobia and considers how political commentators, philosophers, social scientists, and psychologists have attempted to account for the hatred of strangers. He discusses xenophobia alongside Western nationalism, mass migration, genocide, and colonialism, and offers an account of its international resurgence in the twenty-first century.

This book was the winner of the 87th annual Anisfield-Wolf Book Award and the International Psychoanalytical Association’s 2023 Elisabeth Young-Bruehl Prejudice Award. Author Thomas Chatterton Williams reviewed the book in The New York Times, describing it as "riveting" and "a meditation on a subject that has vexed human society at least since the dawn of consciousness". The book was also reviewed in The Wall Street Journal and The Washington Post.

== Personal life ==
Makari is the son of medical researcher Jack Makari.
