= Chilingaryan =

Chilingaryan (Armenian: Չիլինկարեան, derived from Turkish çilingir meaning "locksmith") is an Armenian surname. Notable people with the surname include:

- Artashes Chilingaryan (1883–1968), an Armenian politician
- Arsen Chilingaryan (1965–2013), a Soviet Armenian footballer
- Artur Chilingarov (1939–present), an Armenian-Russian polar explorer with a Russified variant of the surname
