= Yu Huang =

Yu Huang is one of the names of the Jade Emperor, a Chinese deity. Yu Huang or Huang Yu may also refer to:

- Yu Huang (nanoscientist), Chinese and American nanoscientist
- Huang Yu (1916–2013), Chinese film director, screenwriter and actor
