= Ron Weaver =

Ron Weaver may refer to:

- Ron Weaver (American football) (born 1965), American who was unable to make it onto a professional team after college so he played for the University of Texas under a fake identity
- Ron Weaver (TV producer) (1937–2013), American television producer and author
- Ron Weaver (mayor), American attorney and mayor of Tallahassee, Florida
