= Héctor Díaz-Polanco =

Mexican academic and politician

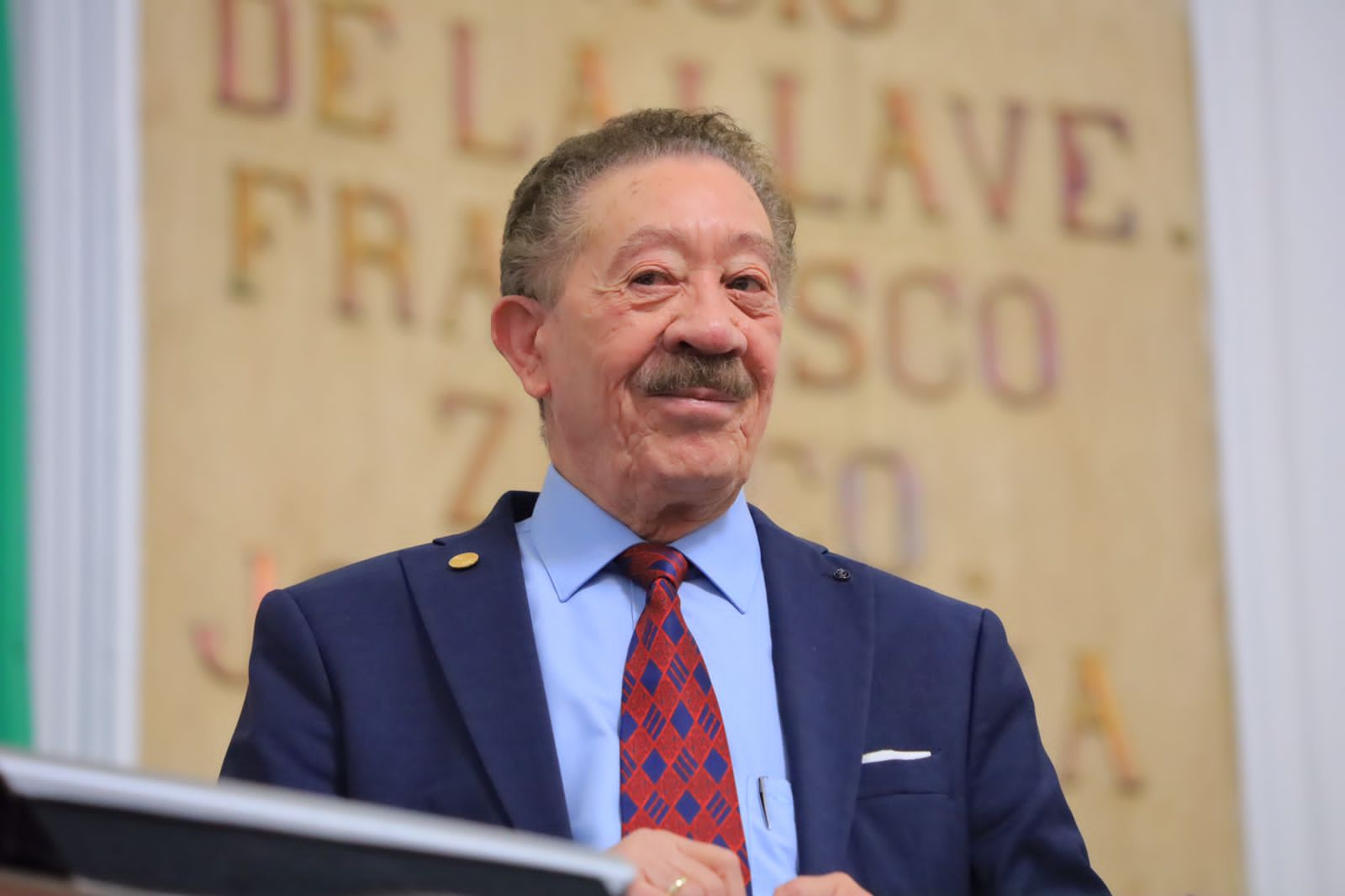
- Academic and Politician
- Born: Dominican Republic
- Occupations: Politician, Academic
- Known for: Deputy of the Congress of Mexico City (September 1, 2021 – August 30, 2024); President of the Congress of Mexico City (September 1, 2021 – September 5, 2022)
- Political party: National Regeneration Movement
- Website: hectordiazpolanco.mx

Héctor Díaz-Polanco is a Dominican Republic–born Mexican academic and politician, with studies in anthropology at the National Autonomous University of Mexico and in sociology at El Colegio de México. He currently serves as a deputy in the Congress of Mexico City, of which he was president between 2021 and 2022.

Since 1976, he has been a professor and researcher at the Center for Research and Advanced Studies in Social Anthropology (CIESAS), which is part of Mexico's network of public research centers.

== Awards and honors ==
He is the only academic who has received the four main essay awards in Latin America. In 2006, he received the International Essay Prize, organized by Siglo XXI Editores. In 2008, he received the Casa de las Américas Prize. In 2016, he was awarded the Liberator Prize for Critical Thought, and in 2020 he was recognized with the Fernando Ortiz International Prize. Additionally, in 2006 his institution awarded him the Ángel Palerm Prize.

The National Council for Science and Technology (Conacyt) named him a National Researcher in the National System of Researchers (SNI), level III.

== Academic and editorial activity ==
He has participated in more than 500 scientific events and has given conferences or served as a guest professor at universities in Latin America, the United States, and Europe. He was a full-time professor at the National School of Anthropology and History (1974–1977), at the National Institute of Anthropology and History (INAH).

He has served as a judge for national and international awards, such as the "Fray Bernardino de Sahagún in Social Anthropology" award from the National Institute of Anthropology and History (Mexico, 1991 and 1993); the "Casa de las Américas" award (Havana, 1992); the "Award of the ALBA Countries in Arts and Letters" (2009); the "International Essay Prize 'Thinking Against the Current'" (Havana, 2010 and 2017); the "International Essay Prize El Libertador" (Caracas, 2011); and the "International Essay Prize Mariano Picón Salas" (Caracas, 2011).

He was co-editor of the magazines Bulletin of American Anthropology of the Pan-American Institute of Geography and History (1980–2005) and Socialist Convergence (1997–2000); and a member of the advisory boards for the magazines: Latin American Perspectives (California, since 1994), Desacatos. Revista de Antropología Social (2000–2003), and Dialectics (since 1994). He directed Memoria. Revista de política y cultura from 1997 until 2007.

== Other activities ==
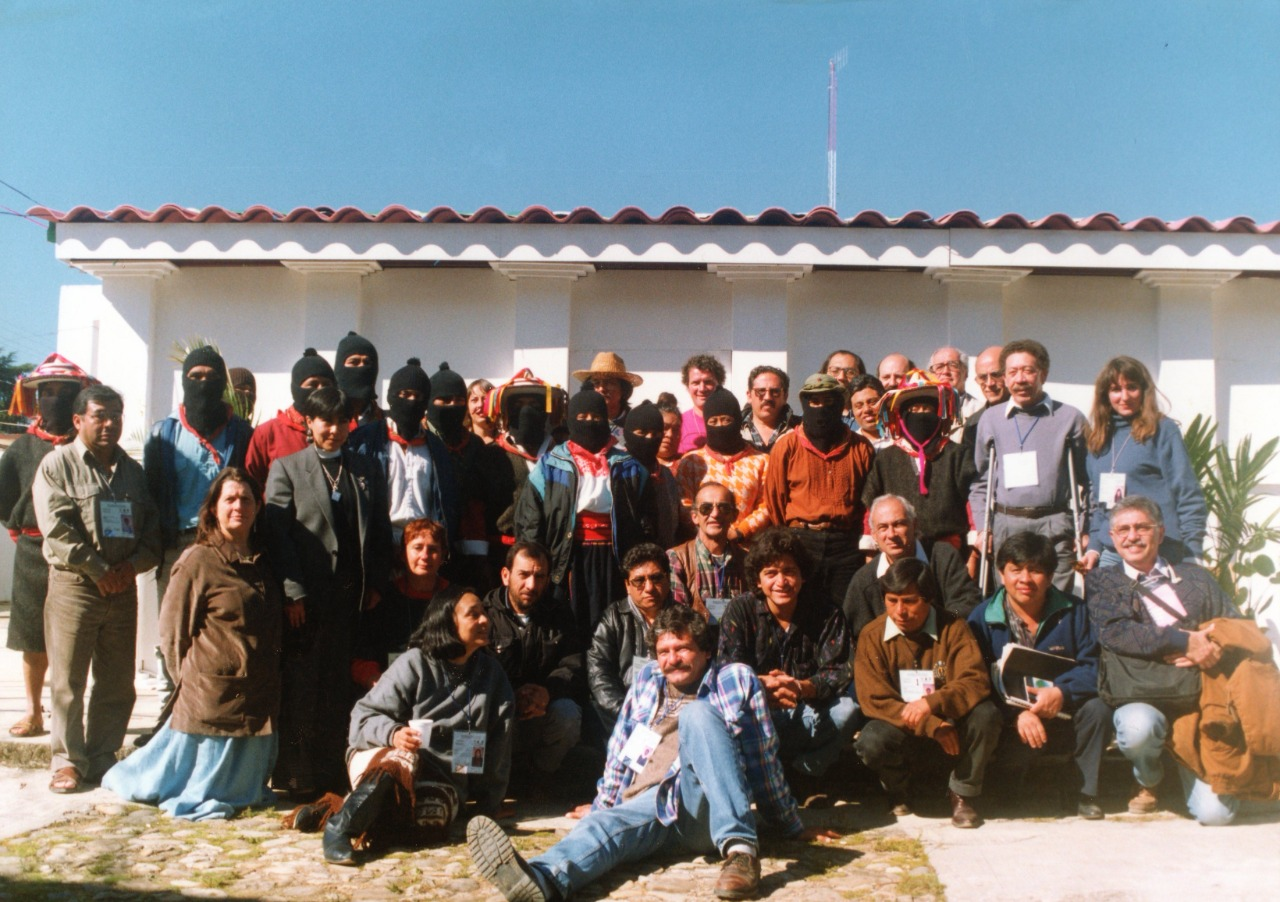
Héctor Díaz-Polanco with academics and researchers, alongside members of the Zapatista Army of National Liberation.

He also served as a consultant on indigenous issues (1993–1995) for the Food and Agriculture Organization of the United Nations (FAO). He was an advisor to the National Autonomy Commission (Managua, 1984–1987) that designed the autonomy regime of Nicaragua’s Atlantic Coast; and to the Zapatista Army of National Liberation (EZLN) for negotiations with the Mexican Government on "Indigenous Rights and Culture", which resulted in the San Andrés Accords (1995–1996). He is a founding member of the international organization “In Defense of Humanity”. In 2007, he advised indigenous and peasant organizations in Bolivia, and provided consultancy to the Autonomy and State Restructuring Commissions of the Bolivian Constituent Assembly.

Together with Mexican writers and academics (Carlos Monsiváis, José María Pérez Gay, Carlos Payán, Arnaldo Córdova, Enrique Semo, Víctor Flores Olea, Laura Esquivel, Luis Javier Garrido, Elena Poniatowska, Hugo Gutiérrez Vega, Héctor Vasconcelos, among others), in 2008 he joined the Committee of Intellectuals in Defense of Oil, which worked closely with Andrés Manuel López Obrador until the founding of Morena in 2014.

Since 2012, he has been a member of the Advisory Council of the National Regeneration Movement (MORENA) and served as president of its jurisdictional body (the National Commission of Honesty and Justice) from 2012 to 2020.

He was elected deputy of the Congress of Mexico City (2021–2024). He served as president of this legislative body until September 5, 2022.

== Publications ==
- Polanco, Héctor Díaz (1987). Etnia, nación y política. J. Pablos Editor. ISBN 978-968-6039-74-0.
- Polanco, Héctor Díaz (1996). Autonomía regional: la autodeterminación de los pueblos indios. Siglo XXI. ISBN 978-968-23-2005-7.
- Polanco, Héctor Díaz; Rayas, Lucia (17 de junio de 2019). Indigenous Peoples in Latin America: The Quest for Self-Determination. Routledge. ISBN 978-0-429-49986-9. doi:10.4324/9780429499869/indigenous-peoples-latin-america-héctor-díaz-polanco-lucia-rayas
- Polanco, Héctor Díaz (1 de enero de 1997). La rebelión zapatista y la autonomía. Siglo XXI. ISBN 978-968-23-2061-3.
- Polanco, Héctor Díaz (1985). La cuestión étnico-nacional. Editorial Línea. ISBN 978-968-7250-04-5.
- Polanco, Héctor Díaz; Sánchez, Consuelo (2002). México diverso: el debate por la autonomía. Siglo XXI. ISBN 978-968-23-2376-8.
- Polanco, Héctor Díaz (2004). El canon Snorri: diversidad cultural y tolerancia. Universidad de la Ciudad de México. ISBN 978-968-5720-10-6.
- Polanco, Héctor Díaz (2006). El laberinto de la identidad. UNAM. ISBN 978-970-32-3078-5.
- Polanco, Héctor Díaz (2007). Elogio de la diversidad: globalización, multiculturalismo y etnofagia. Siglo XXI. ISBN 978-968-23-2638-7.
- Polanco, Héctor Díaz (2009). La diversidad cultural y la autonomía en México. Nostra Ediciones. ISBN 978-607-7603-09-2.
- Polanco, Héctor Díaz (20 de junio de 2012). La cocina del diablo: El fraude del 2006 y los intelectuales. Grupo Planeta Spain. ISBN 978-607-07-1246-3.
- Díaz-Polanco, Héctor (12 de octubre de 2020). El jardín de las identidades: la comunidad y el poder (en inglés). Grupo Editor Orfila Valentini. ISBN 978-607-7521-35-8.
- Polanco, Héctor Díaz (2016). El nacimiento de la antropología: positivismo y evolucionismo. Orfila. ISBN 978-607-7521-38-9.
- Polanco, Héctor Díaz (2017). El gran incendio: la rebelión de Tehuantepec. Orfila. ISBN 978-607-7521-44-0.
