= Morten Qvale =

Norwegian photographer (born 1957)

Morten Qvale (born 25 September 1957 in Drøbak) is a Norwegian fashion, commercial and art photographer. He has been shooting professionally since 1986. He lives and works in the Oslo area.

== Career ==
In 1982 Qvale bought his first camera, and in 1983 he initiated Tique, Norway's first international fashion magazine. As the editor-in-chief at Tique, Qvale had the opportunity to learn from experienced fashion photographers such as Guy Bourdin, Bill King, Terence Donovan and Knut Bry. He soon began creating his own photographs.

In order to pursue his career in photography, Qvale left Tique and moved on to shooting international campaigns for clients such as Oscar de la Renta, Jordache, Adidas, H&M, Reebok and editorial clients such as Vanity Fair, Elle International, L'officiel, and Schön. Celebrities, such as Claudia Schiffer, Helena Christensen, Anna Nicole Smith, Dita Von Teese, Donald Sutherland and Calvin Klein, are among the people he has photographed. He has also directed several commercials for Adidas, Synsam, Garnier, Kristian Aadnevik, and music videos for Tone Damli, Lars Jones, Sichelle, and Elisabeth Andreassen.

Qvale is one of Hasselblad's featured users.

Qvale had his first solo exhibition with Shot in a tent during the Norwegian International Film Festival in 2000. The exhibition showcased 30 celebrity photographs he had captured during the 1999 festival. It was also exhibited at the Norwegian Film Institute in Oslo in 2000. In 2005 and 2007 Qvale had two separate solo exhibitions at Kunsthuset gallery. In 2012 he participated in the group exhibition Motefotografi - Tradisjon og nyskapning at Preus Museum. His photography of both landscapes and nudes is sold to art collectors worldwide, mainly through his gallery, Qvale Galleri.

In 2013 Qvale opened the Qvale Galleri in Oslo, where he in 2014 opened an exhibition with the photographer Albert Watson.

Later Career (2019–) In May 2019, Morten Qvale played a central role in the exhibition FAME, a collaboration between Qvale Galleri and Galleri Fineart in Oslo. The exhibition was a success and marked the beginning of a broader initiative at Fineart to focus on international fine art photography. Qvale was appointed to lead this effort, which has since resulted in collaborations with several renowned international photographers, including Albert Watson, Patrick Demarchelier, David Yarrow, David Bailey, Tyler Shields, Christian Voigt, Ron Galella, Ellen von Unwerth, and Terry O’Neill, to name a few.

In 2020, Qvale exhibited his work at Galleri Tres Hombres Art at Per Gessle’s hotel in Tylösand, Sweden. In the summer of 2021, he opened the exhibition Waterfront at Galleri Fineart in Kragerø. On 10 November 2021, he launched the photobook Qvalified, a retrospective collection featuring photographs from 1986 to 2021. The book was released in conjunction with the exhibition Qvalified, which showcased works spanning his entire career. During Easter 2023, he opened the exhibition Mountain Life at Skarsnuten Hotel in Hemsedal.

Qvale’s artistic photography is structured around four main themes: Man Made Landscape, Landscape, Natural Beauty, and Forms. In 2022, he began working on a new series titled Racing Cars, focusing on both classic and modern race cars. This body of work culminated in a large-scale exhibition titled ICONS, which opened at Galleri Fineart in Oslo in January 2025. As part of the project, Qvale photographed iconic cars and motorsport environments from events and locations such as Le Mans, Mille Miglia, Goodwood, Monza, Las Vegas, and Monaco. ICONS received considerable attention and was regarded as both an artistic and commercial success.
