= Lenin Gani =

- Born: United Kingdom
- Other names: Asif
- Organization(s): Sports Editor, BDNews24

Lenin Gani (Bengali: লেনিন গনি) (9 December 1967- 23 May 2013) was a highly respected Bangladeshi sports journalist. He was the sports editor of New Age, and later Bdnews24.com, and was a senior member of the Bangladesh Sports Journalists Association.

== Career ==
Lenin worked for a number of major newspapers of Bangladesh, including, from 1993 to 2006, The Daily Star. In 2001, Lenin won the prestigious Best Sports Report award from Dhaka Reporters Unity.

== Death ==
In 2008, Lenin was diagnosed with a rare terminal illness pulmonary hypertension. He moved to the UK to receive treatment, and continued to contribute to Bangladeshi journalism in his debilitating state. On 23 May 2013, Lenin died from his condition.

== Family ==
Lenin has a wife and daughter who live in the United Kingdom. His paternal family hail from Beanibazar.

== See also ==
- List of Bangladeshi people
- Deaths in May 2013
