= Fyodor Tuvin =

Russian footballer

Personal information
- Full name: Fyodor Tuvin
- Date of birth: 3 July 1973
- Place of birth: Ivanovo, USSR
- Date of death: 13 May 2013 (aged 39)
- Place of death: Ivanovo, Russia
- Height: 1.77 m (5 ft 10 in)
- Position: Midfielder

Senior career*
| Years | Team | Apps | (Gls) |
| 1991–1998 | FC Tekstilshchik Ivanovo | 287 | (40) |
| 1998 | FC Dynamo Vologda | 15 | (2) |
| 1999–2000 | FC Shinnik Yaroslavl | 30 | (2) |
| 2001–2002 | FC Amkar Perm | 22 | (0) |
| 2003 | FC Tekstilshchik Ivanovo | 14 | (2) |
| 2003 | FC Spartak Shchyolkovo | 0 | (0) |
| 2004 | FC Obninsk | 10 | (0) |
| 2005 | FC Don | 11 | (1) |
- * Club domestic league appearances and goals

Fyodor Vladimirovich Tuvin (Russian: Фёдор Владимирович Тувин; 3 July 1973 – 13 May 2013) was a Russian football midfielder.

Tuvin was born and died in Ivanovo, and played for his home club, FC Tekstilshchik Ivanovo, for seven years. He made his debut in the Russian Premier League in 1999 for FC Shinnik Yaroslavl. He died suddenly at the age of thirty-nine.
