= Hank Kozloski =

Henry W. Kozloski
- Born: December 15, 1927; Plains, Pennsylvania, U.S.
- Died: May 21, 2013 (aged 85); Lorain, Ohio, U.S.
- Occupation: Sportswriter

Henry W. Kozloski (December 15, 1927 – May 21, 2013) was a sportswriter known for his work with The Morning Journal of Lorain, Ohio. He served as the Cleveland Indians and Cleveland Browns beat writer.

== Early life ==
Kozloski was born in Plains, Pennsylvania but moved to Lorain, Ohio in 1939. He was the third of five children. His love of sports came early, despite losing his eye teeth in a football game. He attended Lorain High School from 1942 to 1945.

Upon graduating from high school, he joined the United States Air Force as an instrument flight training instructor and served in the Aleutian Islands. After serving for three years, he attended Ohio University graduating with a journalism degree. Shortly after, he found employment with the local paper in Lockport, New York. On one of his many trips home, he met Helen Bors. They were soon married, and in the late 1950s, returned to their hometown, where Kozloski took a job covering the sports beat for The Lorain Journal (now The Morning Journal.)

== Professional career ==
A dedicated journalist, Kozloski began covering the Cleveland Browns, but was reassigned to the Cleveland Indians. Kozloski traveled with the Indians to spring training camps and road trips from the 1960s to around 1980. He then covered a local news beat until his retirement in the early 1990s. Kozloski was comfortable with both players and front office people. He claimed Art Modell, Herb Score and George Steinbrenner amongst his cohorts, along with numerous baseball players, famous and not so famous.

Kozloski returned to the game when he became an Official Scorer for the Major League Baseball, and stayed in this capacity until approximately 2007, a year after his wife died. He scored two World Series games while in this position.

Kozloski worked for the Lockport, New York Lockport Union-Sun & Journal and Ashtabula, Ohio Star Beacon before settling with The Morning Journal. He later served as a scorekeeper for the Indians for 18 seasons and was a member of the Baseball Writers' Association of America. He was a founding member of the Lorain Sports Hall of Fame, served as president for a spell and was inducted there in 1996.

He also worked for the News-Herald. and was referenced in dozens of books.

Kozloski succumbed to congestive heart failure on May 21, 2013. He is buried next to his wife in Calvary Cemetery, Lorain, Ohio.
