= Sardar Arif Shahid =

Sardar Arif Shahid was a Kashmiri nationalist leader who advocated the independence of Kashmir from both India and Pakistan's rule. He was killed on 14 May 2013 outside his house in Rawalpindi. His supporters allege that his Pakistan security forces killed him.

Arif Shahid was also the first pro-independence Kashmiri leader who was killed in Pakistan.
