= Leonard Harbin =

English cricketer

Personal information
- Born: 30 April 1915; Tunapuna, Trinidad
- Died: 19 May 2013 (aged 98); England
- Batting: Right-handed
- Role: Bowler

Domestic team information
- Years: Team
- 1948–1951: Gloucestershire

Career statistics
Competition	FC
Matches	12
Runs scored	337
Batting average	19.82
100s/50s	0/2
Top score	89
Balls bowled	633
Wickets	25
Bowling average	25.32
5 wickets in innings	1
10 wickets in match	0
Best bowling	5/80
Catches/stumpings	11/0
- Source: Cricinfo, 6 August 2016

Leonard Harbin (30 April 1915 – 19 May 2013) was an English cricketer. Born in Trinidad, in the West Indies, he played for Gloucestershire between 1948 and 1951.
