= Muttanisseril Koyakutty =

Indian muslim scholar

Muttanisseril M. Koyakutty
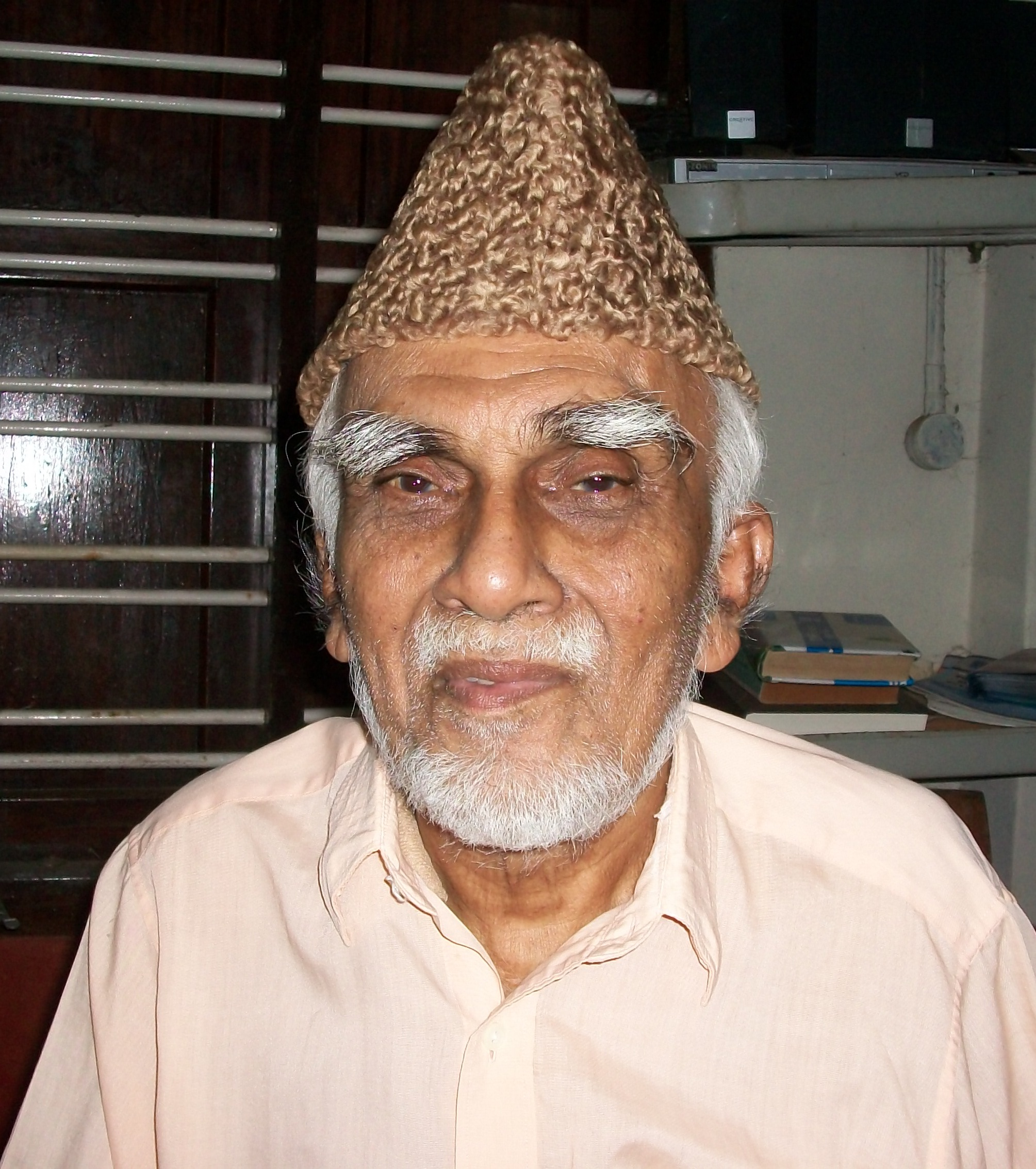
- Born: August 14, 1926; Kayamkulam, Allepey Kerala, India
- Died: May 27, 2013 (aged 86)
- Occupations: Islamic scholar, author, orator
- Spouse: Nabeesa Beevi(Late)
- Children: Nazeema Shajahan (Late), Ameena Jamal, Thaha Hussain, Ashraf (Late), Thasneem (Late), Shadiya Sherafudeen, Maqbool Hussain
- Writing career
- Language: Malayalam, English, Arabic
- Genre: Religion - Islam
- Notable work: Translation of the Quran to Malayalam,

Muttanisseril Koyakutty Maulavi (14 August 1926 – 27 May 2013) was an Islamic scholar, orator and author who comes from the southern state of Kerala in India. His works in the scientific interpretation of the Quran, its translation into the local language (Malayalam), and authoring of various articles related to Islam and its studies have been published in various mediums and are very well received. He was awarded the Kerala Sahithya Akademi Literary award for translating the Quran in 1967 . He died on 27 May 2013.

== Books in English ==
He has authored twenty five books, published in Malayalam and English, including the Malayalam Translation of the Quran and Ibn Qaldun's Muqaddima.

1. Fact or Fallacy
2. Science enshrined in the glorious Quran
3. Science Behind The Miracle
4. The Challenge
5. Method In The Quran – 1987
6. Theory Of Evolution And The Quran
7. Essays : Thoughts On The Quran : Eighty Essays Published In The Oman Observer (2000 – 2003)
8. Washington speeches : Twenty lectures delivered in Islamic centre, Maryland, U.S.A., ready for Publication, October 2003.

== Picture Gallery ==
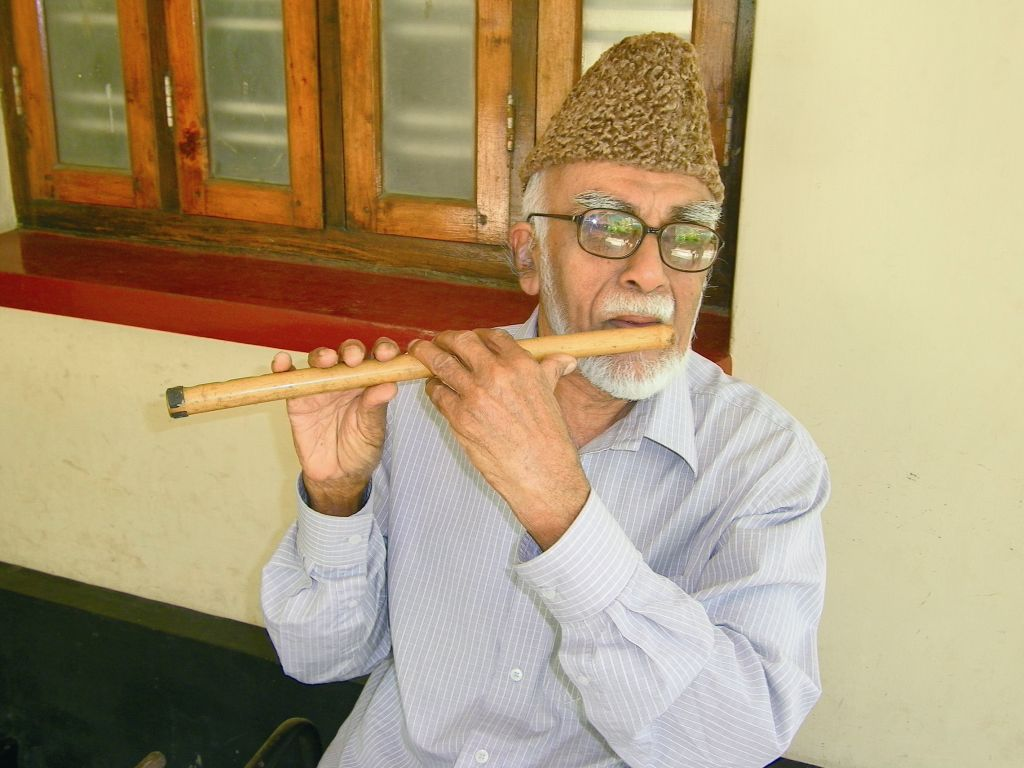
With his favorite instrument - the flute

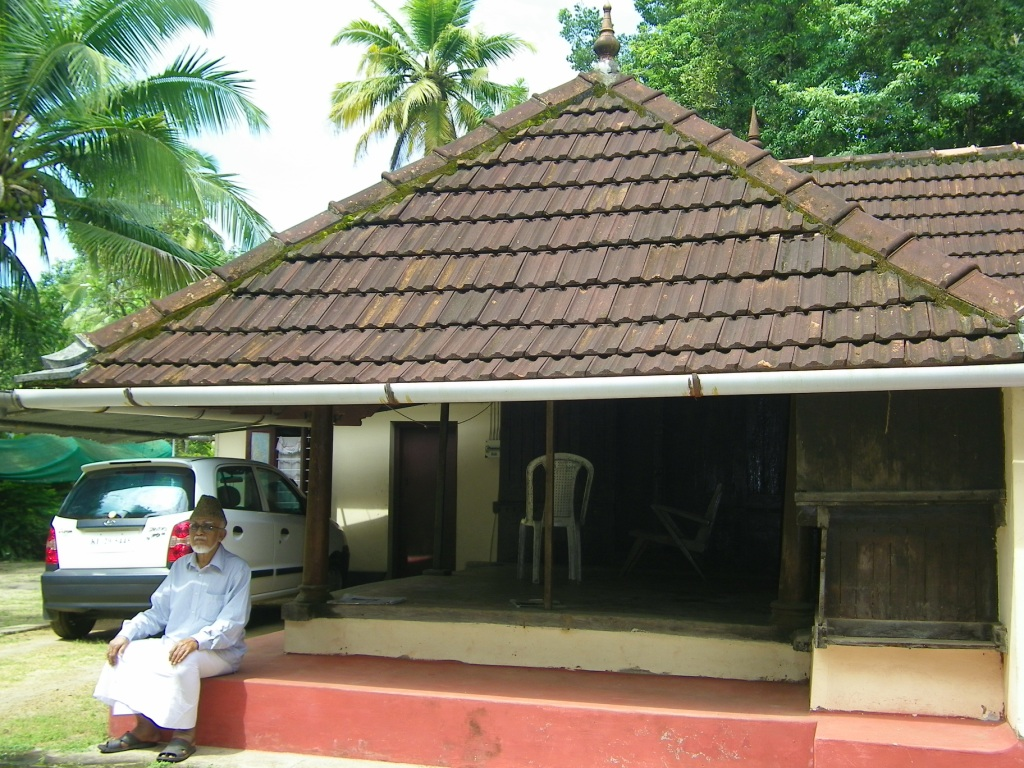
Muttanisseril Koyakutty

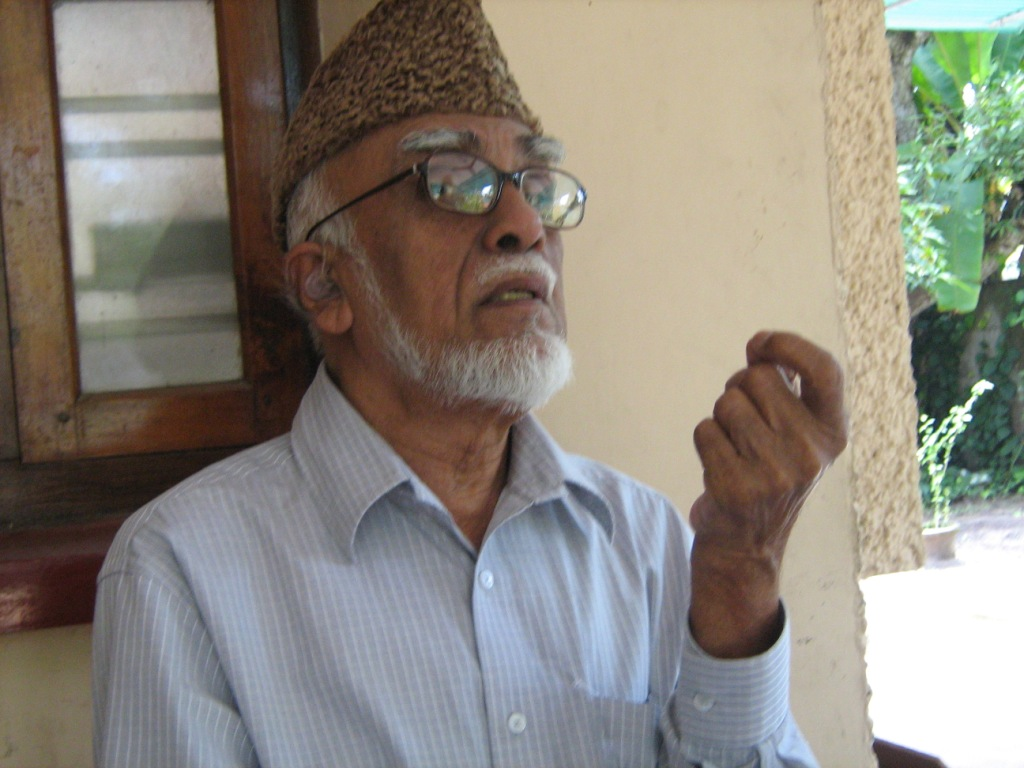
Muttanisseril Koyakutty

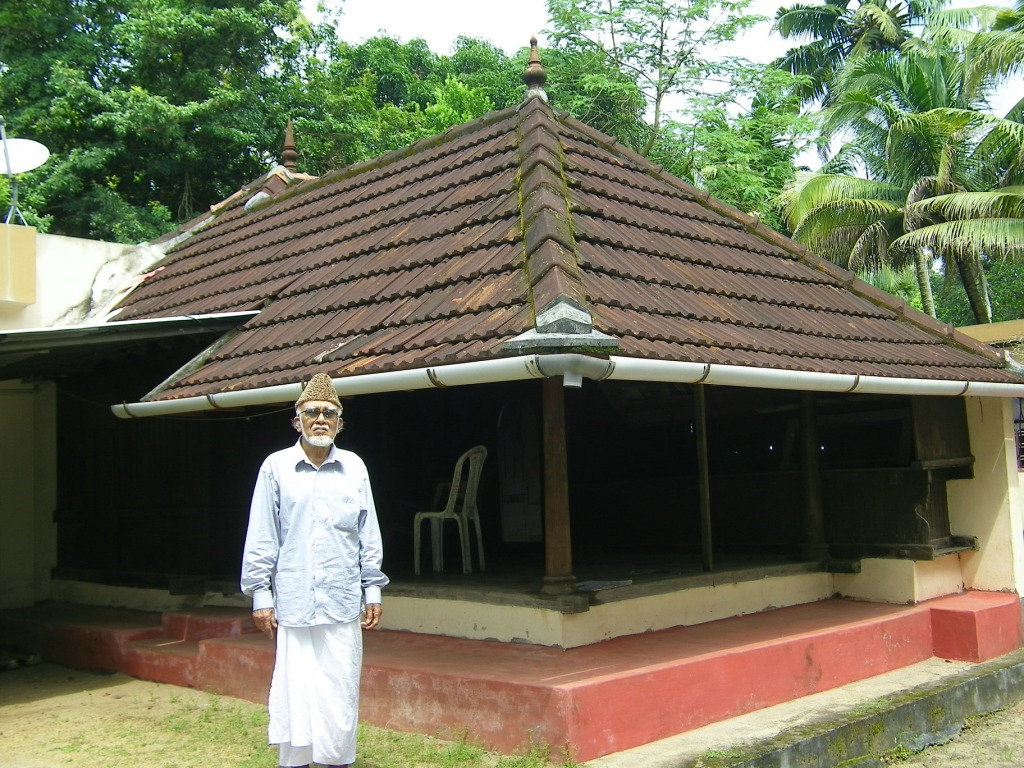
Muttanisseril Koyakutty

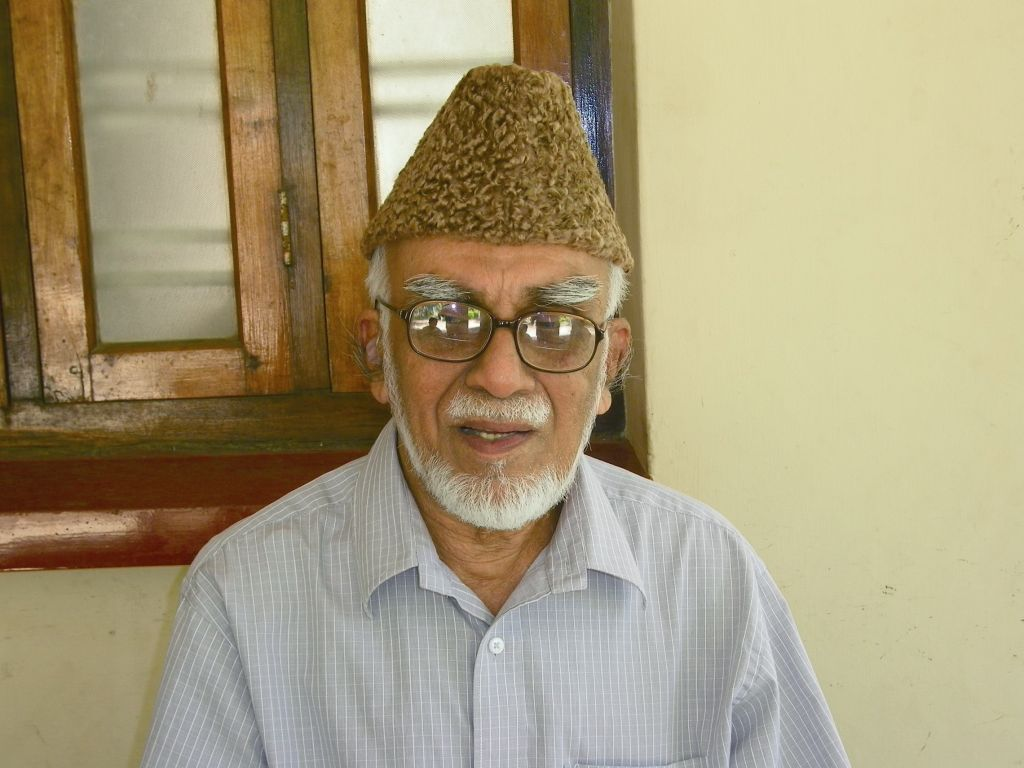
Muttanisseril Koyakutty
