= John Shea Jr. =

American politician (1928–2013)

John F. Shea Jr. (September 11, 1928 – May 10, 2013) was an American businessman, jurist, and politician.

Born in Manchester, Connecticut, Shea graduated from Providence College. He then received his law degree from University of Connecticut School of Law and practiced law in Manchester, Connecticut. He served in the Connecticut House of Representatives 1961-1962 as a Republican. In 1973, Shea was appointed Connecticut Superior Court judge serving until 1980 when he resigned to work for Aetna Life and Casualty.
