= Robert Chalmers (cricketer) =

South African cricketer (1945–2013)

Personal information
- Born: 2 October 1945; Benoni, Gauteng, South Africa
- Died: 28 May 2013 (aged 67)
- Source: ESPNcricinfo, 6 June 2016

Robert Chalmers (2 October 1945 – 28 May 2013) was a South African cricketer. He played seventeen first-class matches for Northerns between 1963 and 1971.
