= Preus Museum =

Museum in Norway

Coordinates: 59°25′33″N 10°29′17″E

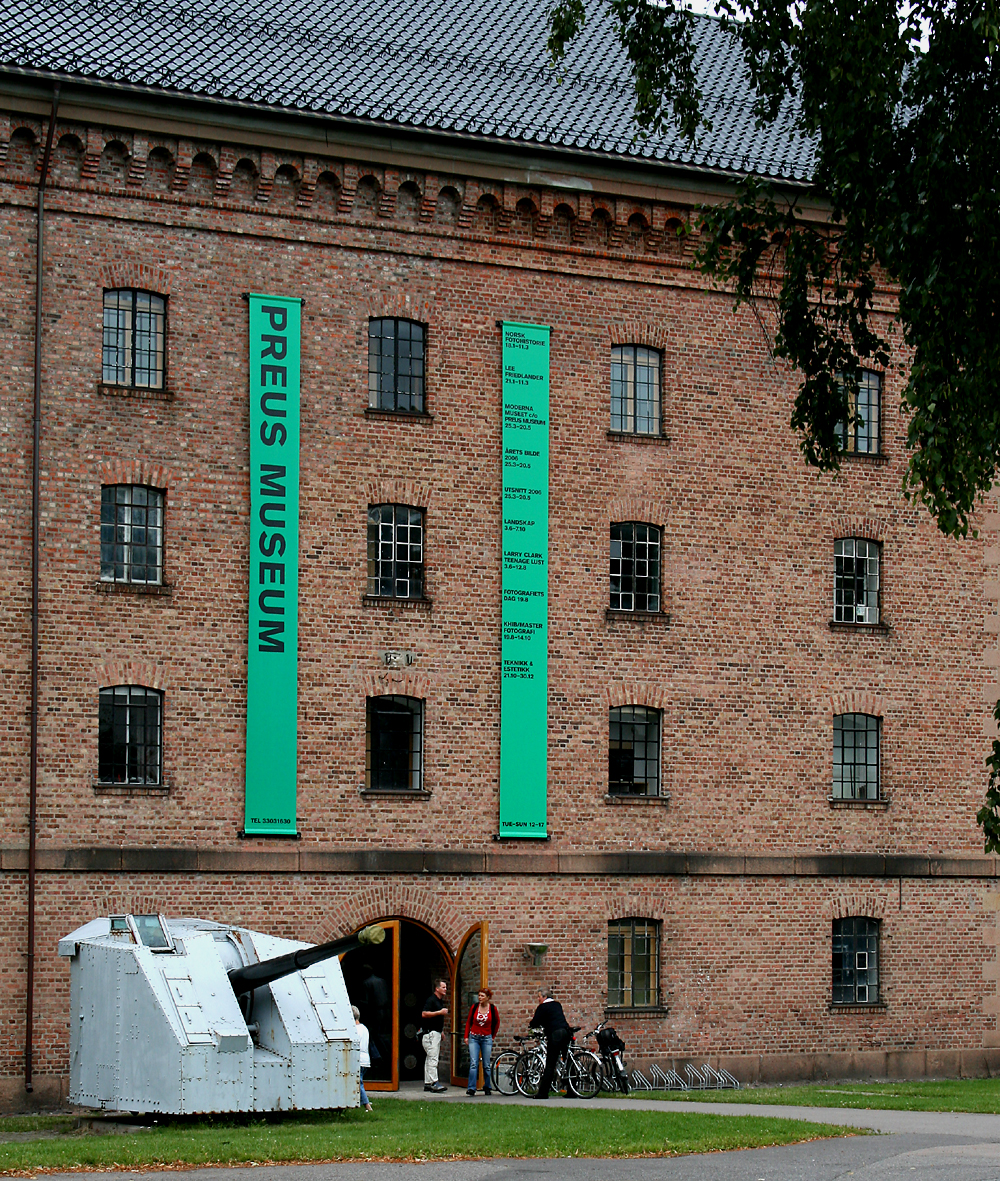
Preus Museum

Preus Museum is the national museum for photography located in Horten, Norway.

Preus Museum was founded in 1976 by Leif Preus and the members of the Preus family as a private museum. The collection was acquired by the Norwegian government in 1995. The museum's collection consists of photos and various other forms of images, together with cameras and related equipment which illustrate the history of photography. In 2001, the museum moved to the former naval facility at Karljohansvern in Vestfold county. The facilities have been adapted for museum use based on the work of architect Sverre Fehn.

== See also ==
- Morten Qvale, Norwegian fashion photographer
