= Willie Birrell =

Scottish footballer

Personal information
- Full name: William Oswald Birrell
- Date of birth: 2 March 1893
- Place of birth: Dunfermline, Scotland
- Date of death: December 1968 (aged 75)
- Place of death: Canada
- Position: Centre half

Senior career*
Years	Team	Apps	(Gls)
–1913	Inverkeithing United		
1913–1925	Cowdenbeath	123	(4)
1925–1927	St Bernard's	30	(0)
- * Club domestic league appearances and goals

William Oswald Birrell (2 March 1893 – December 1968) was a Scottish professional footballer who played in the Scottish League for Cowdenbeath and St Bernard's as a centre half.

== Personal life ==
Birrell served in the Queen's Own Cameron Highlanders during the First World War and later emigrated to Canada, where he worked for Salada tea.

== Career statistics ==
Appearances and goals by club, season and competition
Club	Season	League			Scottish Cup		Total	
Club	Season	Division	Apps	Goals	Apps	Goals	Apps	Goals
Cowdenbeath	1913–14	Scottish Division Two	12	0	6	0	18	0
Cowdenbeath	1914–15	Scottish Division Two	8	0	2	0	10	0
Cowdenbeath	1921–22	Scottish Division Two	35	0	3	0	38	0
Cowdenbeath	1922–23	Scottish Division Two	25	1	2	0	27	1
Cowdenbeath	1923–24	Scottish Division Two	33	2	2	0	35	2
Cowdenbeath	1924–25	Scottish Division One	10	1	0	0	10	1
Cowdenbeath	Total		123	4	15	0	138	4
St Bernard's	1925–26	Scottish Division Two	30	0	1	0	31	0
Career total			153	4	16	0	169	4

== Honours ==
Cowdenbeath

- Scottish League Division Two (2): 1913–14, 1914–15
- Scottish League Division Two second-place promotion (1): 1923–24

Inverkeithing United

- Scottish Junior Cup (1): 1912–13

Individual

- Cowdenbeath Hall of Fame
