= Mufti Abdullah =

Pakistani politician

Mufti Abdullah (1931 – May 31, 2013) was a Pakistani politician. He was the Gilgit-Baltistan MLA for Khaplu.
