= Terezo =

Brazilian footballer

Personal information
- Full name: Antônio da Silva Terezo
- Date of birth: 7 October 1953
- Place of birth: Macaé, Brazil
- Date of death: 7 May 2013 (aged 59)
- Height: 1.69 m (5 ft 7 in)
- Position: Defender

International career
Years	Team	Apps	(Gls)
- Brazil Olympic

Antônio da Silva Terezo (7 October 1953 – 7 May 2013), known as Terezo, was a Brazilian footballer who played as a defender. He competed in the men's tournament at the 1972 Summer Olympics.
