= Ronald Thresher =

English cricketer

Personal information
- Full name: Ronald Stanley Thresher
- Born: 31 December 1930; Tonbridge, Kent, England
- Died: 2 May 2013 (aged 82); Dover, Kent, England
- Batting: Right-handed
- Bowling: Right-arm fast

Domestic team information
- Years: Team
- 1957: Kent
- FC debut: 26 June 1957 Kent v Yorkshire
- Last FC: 9 July 1958 DR Jardine's XI v Cambridge University

Career statistics
Competition	First-class
Matches	5
Runs scored	51
Batting average	10.20
100s/50s	0/0
Top score	19
Balls bowled	848
Wickets	14
Bowling average	29.07
5 wickets in innings	0
10 wickets in match	0
Best bowling	4/29
Catches/stumpings	0/–
- Source: CricInfo, 7 June 2016

Ronald Stanley Thresher (31 December 1930 – 2 May 2013), known as Ron Thresher, was an English cricketer who played five first-class cricket matches between 1957 and 1958.

Thresher was born in Tonbridge, Kent and educated at Maidstone Grammar School where he played cricket. As a fast bowler, Thresher was described as a bowler who "often terrorised schoolboy batsmen". He pursued a career as a banker in Coutts, playing cricket for Private Banks Cricket Club. In 1952 he was selected for the Club Cricket Conference as a result of his performances. He won a CCC cap in 1956.

Thresher made his debut for Kent County Cricket Club's Second XI in 1957 and, after taking eight wickets against Middlesex Seconds XI at Lord's, he made his first-class debut for the county against Yorkshire at Tunbridge Wells later the same season. He played once more for the Kent First XI during the year and made three first-class appearances for DR Jardine's XI, one in 1957 and two in 1958. He continued to play for Kent's Second XI in the Minor Counties Championship and Second XI Championship until 1959 and remained active in club cricket during the 1960s.

As well as playing cricket, Thresher also played rugby union for Harlequins. He died at Dover in 2013 aged 82.
