= Sylvester Sanfilippo =

American pediatrician (1926–2013)

Sylvester J. "Sy" Sanfilippo (January 1, 1926 – May 2, 2013) was an American pediatrician from Edina, Minnesota, who first described a mucopolysaccharide storage disease that bears his name: Sanfilippo syndrome. Sanfilippo was born in Rochester, New York. After graduating from the University of Rochester in 1947, he moved to Salt Lake City to pursue postgraduate studies at the University of Utah. There he received a Master of Science degree in Biochemistry and earned his medical degree in 1955. He did his Pediatrics training at the University of Minnesota, interrupted by a two-year period as a pediatrician in the United States Navy Medical Corps in Portsmouth and Norfolk, Virginia.

In 1960 Sanfilippo was awarded a postdoctoral research fellowship and began a comprehensive study of children with mucopolysaccharide storage disease at the University of Minnesota. The investigative approach combined the chemical measurement and identification of urinary acid mucopolysaccharides with a thorough clinical evaluation of each patient.

The work of Sanfilippo and his colleagues described eight mentally challenged children with mucopolysacchariduria of a single compound, heparitin sulfate. In contrast, their thirteen patients with Hunter–Hurler syndrome showed mucopolysacchariduria of two compounds, heparitin sulfate and chondroitin sulfate B. The majority of the heparitin sulfate excreters had a normal or near-normal facial appearance and displayed mild to slight somatic and radiographic manifestations in comparison with their Hunter–Hurler counterparts, who showed more severe involvement. These observations indicated the existence of a new inborn error of the mucopolysaccharide metabolism.

Sanfilippo presented the results of the study at the annual American Pediatric Society Meeting in May 1963, and published a report later that year.

He entered the private practice of Pediatrics in April 1962, but continued his research at the University of Minnesota for several more years. During his practice years he participated in regional health care planning and published a perinatal mortality review study (1976). Sanfilippo enjoyed his teaching experiences with medical students and physicians-in-training. He retired from private practice in June 1988.

Sanfilippo died on May 2, 2013, aged 87.
