= Anthony Trickett =

Scottish doctor

Anthony Robert Trickett MBE DL (1940 – 17 May 2013) was a Scottish doctor and Lord Lieutenant of Orkney.

Trickett practised in several hospitals in Manchester between 1964 and 1966, then demonstrating Anatomy at University of Manchester between 1966 and 1967. From 1967 to 1973, he was a General Practitioner at Pembroke in Dyfed and from 1973 to 2000 in Hoy and Walls. From 1973, he was Honorary Medical Advisor of Longhope Lifeboat and became its Honorary Secretary in 1995. From 2000 he was chairman of the Longhope Lifeboat Museum Trust. Trickett was a Divisional Medical Advisor. He was a member of the Medical and Survival Committee of the Royal National Lifeboat Institution (RNLI) and received the Institution's Silver Badge in 1994 and the Gold Badge in 2004.

Trickett was a trustee of the Hoy Trust from 1984, becoming its chairman in 1992. From 2003, he was trustee of the Pickaquoy Centre in Kirkwall. Between 2000 and 2006, he was director of Orkney Enterprise. He was a director of the Gable End Theatre in Hoy and chairman of the Hoy Half Marathon, which he had founded with John Eccles. Having been made a Member of the Order of the British Empire (MBE) in 1998, Trickett was appointed a Deputy Lieutenant of Orkney in 1999. In 2005, he was made Vice Lord Lieutenant and on 27 February 2007 he became Lord Lieutenant.

Trickett died in May 2013, leaving a widow.

Honorary titles
Preceded by George Marwick	Lord Lieutenant of Orkney; 2007–2013	Succeeded by James William Spence
