= Marian Jeżak =

Polish ice hockey player and coach

- Born: 26 September 1928 Krynica, Poland
- Died: 14 May 2013 (aged 84) Łapy, Poland
- Height: 5 ft 6 in (168 cm)
- Weight: 150 lb (68 kg; 10 st 10 lb)
- Position: Right wing
- Played for: KTH Krynica; Unia Krynica; Legia Warsaw
- National team: Poland
- Playing career: 1947–1961

Marian Jeżak (26 September 1928 – 14 May 2013) was a Polish ice hockey player. He played for KTH Krynica, Unia Krynica, and Legia Warsaw during his career. He also played for the Polish national team at the 1952 Winter Olympics, and the 1955 World Championships. During his playing career Jeżak won the Polish league championship eight times: in 1950 with Krynica, and seven further times with Legia. After his playing career, he turned to coaching and led the Polish team for a few years.
