= Leif Preus =

Norwegian photographer and museum founder

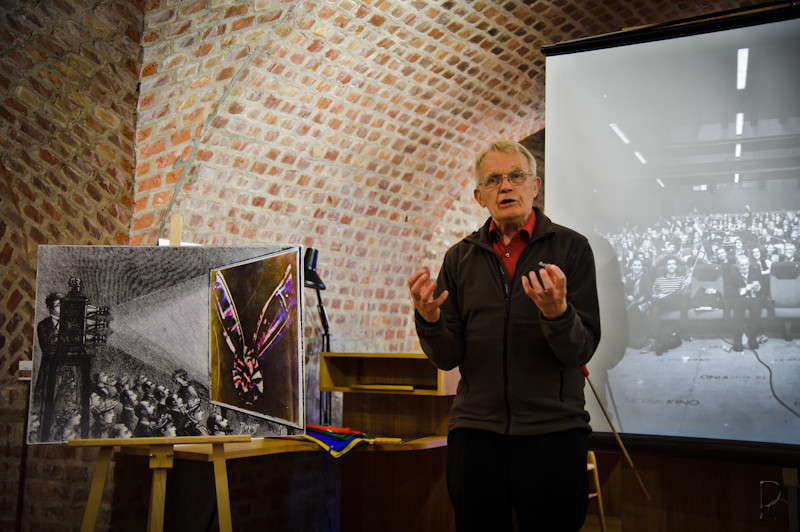
Leif Preus, 2011.

Leif Preus (18 February 1928 – 5 May 2013) was a Norwegian photographer and museum founder.

He was born in Horten as a son of Sverre Preus (1897–1988) and Marian Christoffersen (1901–1972). He was married from 1951.

After eight years in the Royal Norwegian Navy he established his photo company Preus Foto in 1956. He established into a nationwide photo store chain. In 1976 his family founded Preus Photo Museum, from 2005 named Preus Museum in his hometown Horten.
