= Tripura (Telugu author) =

త్రిపుర Tripura
- Born: 2 September 1928; Visakhapatnam, Andhra Pradesh, India
- Died: 24 May 2013 (aged 84); Visakhapatnam, Andhra Pradesh, India
- Occupations: Principal, MBB College of Tripura University, Agartala State, India
- Known for: Telugu language short stories

Rayasam Venkata Tripurantakeswara Rao (2 September 1928 – 24 May 2013), popularly known as Tripura, was an Indian Telugu short story writer of the 1960s and 1970s. He was born on 2 September 1928 in Purushottampur Tehsil of Ganjam District of Orissa state. His father was a surgeon and worked in a Government Hospital in that place.

Tripura had his initial schooling at Visakhapatnam in Andhra Pradesh and completed his M.A. (English) from Banaras Hindu University (BHU) in 1953. He did not complete his doctoral thesis on Graham Greene. Tripura initially worked at various places like Burma, Madanapalli, Visakhapatnam, and Jajpur, before settling down in 1960 at Tripura University, Agartala, in the North Eastern State of Tripura, India.

Tripura lived in Visakhapatnam in the state of Andhra Pradesh. He died on 24 May 2013, at the age of 84.

== Education and career ==
- High School: AVN College High School, Visakhapatnam ( Class of 1943 )
- College: Banaras Hindu University, M.A.(English) in 1953
- Employer: Maharaja Beer Bikramsing College, Agartala, Tripura State, India ( Retired as Principal )

R.V.T.K. Rao wrote only 13 short stories in a decade spanning from 1963 to 1973 under the pen name Tripura. Another two stories between 1990 and 1991 His short stories were first published titled Tripura Kathalu in 1980 ( Reference of Tripura in the book Indian Literature by Dr. Nagendra ). Collection of his poems were published titled " Tripura Kafka Kavithalu "., second edition in 1999(including his latest 2 stories), a third eBook only edition in 2011(with new forward ).

Tripura is one of those writers who gave a new dimension to Telugu Short Story by breaking away from the traditional way of story telling. He has a distinctive style of writing by dwelling on the border of poetic lines, brisk pace & brevity of words ( similar to that of Hemingway's style ), inquisitive exploration into wide range of topics that sweeps the ordinary reader from his feet spinning into diggy heights. ( Review of Tripura Short Stories in Telugu language by Shri Kanaka Prasad )

His short stories have brisk pace, brevity of words, allegorical references to various religious symbols and philosophical thinkings of Zen Buddhism, Christianity.

Tripura brings out various human emotions of the prothagonists, pathos, insecurities, guilt, love, joy. The backdrops of his stories span at various places in India – soldiers life in cantonments and borders; revolutionary's dilemma about his journey; etc.

Tripura's short story Subbarayudu Rahasya Jeevitam though inspired by James Thurber’s short story of The Secret Life of Walter Mitty, retains the originality and nativity of a Telugu short story.

Tripura’s short stories have been acclaimed by many well-known Telugu writers like Palagummi Padma Raju, Bhamidipati Ramagopalam, Vaddera Chandidas, Revolutionary poet Nikhileswar, Abburi Gopala Krishna, Chaganti Tulasi, Vegunta Mohana Prasad, Ismile, Vakati Panduranga Rao, R.S. Sudarshan and many others dissecting his stories in the Short Stories Collection Book.

Collection of his poems was published under the title of Tripura Kafka Kadhalu. Some of his poetry was published in Swakal magazine from Agartala.

Tripura’s fans say that, "Tripura is not a famous figure, nor a popular figure, but more of a cult figure."

Tripura was given The Yagalla Foundation Awards for literature, arts and service in the year 2010 at function held in Hyderabad on 11 March 2010.

== Published works ==
Short stories

- " Paamu " (Telugu: పాము ) published in Bharati magazine (Telugu: భారతి ) in August, 1963
- " Hotel lo " (Telugu: హొటల్లో ) published in Bharati magazine (Telugu:భారతి ) in June, 1963
- " Cheekati Gadulu " (Telugu: చీకటి గదులు ) published in Bharati magazine (Telugu:భారతి ) in January, 1967
- " Bhagavantam Kosam " (Telugu: భగవంతం కోసం ) published in Jyothi magazine (Telugu:జ్యోతి ) in January, 1964
- " Prayaanikulu " (Telugu: ప్రయాణికులు ) published in Bharati magazine (Telugu:భారతి ) in December, 1963
- " Subbaraayudi Rahasya Jeevitam " (Telugu: సుబ్బారాయుడి రహస్య జీవితం ) published in Andhra Prabha magazine (Telugu:అంధ్ర ప్రభ ) in May, 1963
- " Kesari vale Keedu " (Telugu: కేసరి వలె కీడు ) published in Bharati magazine (Telugu:భారతి ) in December, 1967
- " Jarkan " (Telugu: జర్కన్ ) published in Bharati magazine (Telugu:భారతి ) in June, 1968
- " Rabandula Rekkala Chappudu " (Telugu: రాబందుల రెక్కల చప్పుడు ) not published in any magazine
- " Kanipinchani Dwaaram " (Telugu: కనిపించని ద్వారం ) published in Bharati magazine (Telugu:భారతి ) in April, 1970
- " Vantenalu " (Telugu: వంతెనలు ) published in Swathi magazine (Telugu:స్వాతి ) in June, 1970
- " Safar " (Telugu: సఫర్ ) published in Taruna magazine (Telugu:తరుణ ) in April, 1973
- " Abhinishkramana " (Telugu: అభినిష్క్రమణ ) published in Taruna magazine (Telugu:తరుణ ) in June, 1973
- " Golusulu-Chaapam-Vidudala Bhavam " (Telugu: గొలుసులు-చాపం-విడుదల భావం ) published in Swathi magazine (Telugu:స్వాతి ) in July, 1981
- " Valasa Pakshula Gaanam " (Telugu: వలస పక్షుల గానం ) published in Andhra Jyothi magazine (Telugu: అంధ్రజ్యోతి ) in December, 1990

Segments ( Poetry ),

- "Segments", A Semi Autobiographical Long Poem composed by Tripura on his 47th birthday (1977); first published in 'Swakala' magazine July – September, 1979. Published as book by Prof. Pradip Choudary Tripura's student and later Colleague at MBB College, Agartala. Professor Pradip Choudary belongs to Hungry Generation or Hungryalist literary movement in the Bengali language launched during the 1960s.
- "Tripura Kafka Kadhalu" ( collection of Poems ),
- Badhalu ~ Sandarbhalu ( Telugu languagu : బాధలు సందర్భాలూ ) ( collection of Poems ),
