= Len Legault =

Profile
- Positions: defensive tackle, offensive tackle

Personal information
- Born: August 14, 1932; Kirkland Lake, Ontario
- Died: May 4, 2013 (aged 80); Regina, Saskatchewan
- Listed height: 6 ft 4 in (1.93 m)
- Listed weight: 235 lb (107 kg)

Career information
- College: Kansas State University

Career history
- 1957–1965: Saskatchewan Roughriders

Len Legault was a Canadian Football League player of the Saskatchewan Roughriders for 9 years as a defensive tackle and an offensive tackle.

After playing football at Kansas State University, Len Legault joined the Saskatchewan Roughriders in 1957 and played 9 years for them. A particularly alert player, Legault recovered 10 fumbles. He was also durable, having played in at least 15 games out of 16 every year except 1961, when he played 12.

In his final year, the Roughriders lost to the Winnipeg Blue Bombers in the semi-finals of the 1965 CFL season, one year before winning their first championship, the 54th Grey Cup. While with the Riders, he began teaching at Thom Collegiate where he stayed for 29 years until 1992. He died in 2013.
