= Péter Szilágyi (conductor) =

Hungarian conductor and politician (1954–2013)

Member of the National Assembly
- In office 28 June 1994 – 14 May 2002

Personal details
- Born: 28 May 1954 Berettyóújfalu, Hungary
- Died: 30 May 2013 (aged 59)
- Party: MSZP
- Profession: conductor

Péter Szilágyi (28 May 1954 – 30 May 2013) was a Hungarian music conductor and politician, member of the National Assembly (MP) for Berettyóújfalu (Hajdú-Bihar County Constituency V) between 1994 and 2002. He was a member of the Committee on Education and Science.

Szilágyi died on 30 May 2013 at the age of 59.
