= Harold Sossen =

- Born: Harold Samuel Sossen; July 26, 1924; Boston, Massachusetts, U.S.
- Died: May 18, 2013 (aged 88); Peabody, Massachusetts U.S.
- Education: Northeastern University, Boston University
- Occupations: Inventor, Business CEO

Harold Samuel Sossen (July 26, 1924 – May 18, 2013) was an American inventor, businessman, educator and writer. He was the president of Harvard Apparatus, the major US manufacturer of specialized physiological research laboratory equipment, where he worked from 1953 until his retirement in 1994.

== Early life ==
Sossen was born in the Dorchester neighborhood of Boston, Massachusetts, the eldest of three sons born to Henry and Mollie (née Weiss) Sossen. He attended Dorchester High School, graduating in 1942. As a boy, he demonstrated an early aptitude for engineering by disassembling and reassembling clocks, toasters and other household appliances

== Military service ==
Sossen was drafted into the U.S. Navy on his 19th birthday in July 1943. After completing basic training, he attended a series of electronics technical schools in California and Texas and was promoted several times, reaching the rank of Radar Technician, Second Class. He embarked on the USS Quincy (CA-71) at Norfolk, Virginia in March, 1945, following Quincy's presidential cruise to Yalta. After shakedown and training in the Pearl Harbor area, Quincy joined Task Force 58 under Vice Admiral Marc Mitscher for strikes in support of the invasion of Okinawa, followed by later attacks on the Japanese home islands. After 57 days at sea, Quincy anchored at Sangami Wan in August, 1945, and escorted U.S.S. Missouri at the surrender of Japan on August 2, 1945. During the occupation, Sossen was tasked with identifying and demolishing Japanese radio and radar stations. Quincy detached from 5th Fleet and arrived in San Francisco in December 1945. Sossen was honorably discharged from U.S. Navy in April 1946.

== Education ==
After his military service, Sossen enrolled at Northeastern University on the G.I. Bill. He graduated in 1951 with a Bachelor of Science in electrical engineering. He then enrolled at Boston University, where he earned a master's degree in education and began pursuit of a doctorate in education.

== Career ==
While pursuing a Doctorate degree at Boston University in 1952, Sossen was introduced to William T. Porter, founder of Harvard Apparatus, by Sossen's wife's thesis advisor. The company, located at the time in a converted dairy farm on the estate of then-Governor Leverett Saltonstall in Dover, Massachusetts, produced a small product line of equipment used to demonstrate principles of physiology in medical schools. Sossen was hired in 1953 as Assistant to the President and undertook the task of expanding and modernizing the factory. He was promoted to vice president. In 1957, under contract to the Joslin Diabetes Center, Sossen invented the first insulin pump. This led to his invention of the lead screw syringe pump, which enabled for the first time precise and dependable metering of intravenous solutions. Over the following decade, Sossen designed and developed many derivative pumps, all based on the lead screw invention, which were adopted in many clinical, research and educational applications. During this period, the company grew rapidly, selling its products worldwide. The "Harvard pump" became known as the global standard for administering dose sensitive IV solutions. Sossen also invented or designed products in many related areas, including modular polygraphs, animal respirators, peristaltic pumps and pulsatile pumps. Sossen was promoted to president in 1967 and relocated the company in 1968 to a new, expanded facility in Millis, Massachusetts. In 1974, Sossen launched the "Whole Rat Catalog", the first comprehensive catalog of small animal research products. Harvard Apparatus was purchased by the Ealing Company in 1977 and relocated to South Natick, Massachusetts. Following the acquisition, Sossen returned to his roots as technical director. He retired in 1994.

== Retirement and writing ==
After his retirement, Sossen traveled the world, spending twenty years cruising the canals of Europe on a 100-year-old wooden barge. In the 1990s, he and his longtime companion Charlotte Mazonson wrote the book Over the Hill and Still Afloat documenting their adventures.

== Personal life and death ==
Sossen was married to Rhea (née Kovar) Sossen from 1951 until their divorce in 1981 and to Roberta "Bobbie" Elliott from 1982 until their divorce a few years later. He lived and traveled with Charlotte Mazonson from 1987 until his death in 2013 from complications from a stroke. He had three children.
