= Grete Dollitz =

American radio presenter

- Born: June 12, 1924; Kaldenkirchen, North Rhine-Westphalia, Germany
- Died: May 9, 2013 (aged 88); Richmond, Virginia
- Spouse: Hans J. Dollitz (m. 1949)
- Presenting career
- Show: Hour With the Guitar with Grete Dollitz
- Station: WCVE-FM
- Time slot: 7:00 - 8:00 a.m. Sunday
- Show: Classical Music with Grete Dollitz
- Time slot: 6:00 - 8:00 a.m. Saturday; 6:00 - 7:00 a.m. Sunday
- Country: United States

Grete Franke Dollitz (June 12, 1924 – May 9, 2013) was an American classical music radio presenter, classical guitarist, and guitar teacher in Richmond, Virginia. She was born in Germany, and immigrated to the United States with her mother and younger brother in 1935 to reunite with her father, who immigrated five years earlier. As a radio presenter, she had a deep voice, and used the phrase "Won't you join me?" at the end of her promos.

Dollitz's program, "An Hour With the Guitar" aired in Richmond, Virginia and in other areas for over 30 years, originally on WFMV (defunct), and later on WRFK. Until December 2012, it aired weekly on WCVE-FM. She also hosted a weekly classical music program on the same station, and an annual Thanksgiving program that highlighted musicians in the Richmond, Virginia area.

American classical guitarist and composer Andrew York is one of Dollitz's former students. Dollitz herself was a student of classical guitar pedagogue and author, Aaron Shearer. Her personal guitar was crafted by the late Washington D.C. luthier Joseph Wallo (#46, 1963).

Dollitz retired from WCVE Public Radio on September 12, 2012. A book of letters she translated from German was published on February 12, 2013. The book, called Letters from the Depression: Part 1 details the first year of her and her parents' immigration story through their letters. Dollitz died on May 9, 2013, in Richmond, Virginia.
