= José García (Chilean footballer) =

Chilean footballer (1931–2013)

Personal information
- Full name: José García Quesada
- Date of birth: 12 May 1931
- Date of death: 12 May 2013 (aged 82)
- Position: Midfielder

International career
Years	Team	Apps	(Gls)
- Chile

José García Quesada (12 May 1931 – 12 May 2013) was a Chilean footballer. He competed in the men's tournament at the 1952 Summer Olympics.
