= Usha Rani Hooja =

Indian sculptor, (1923–2013)

Usha Rani Hooja (18 May 1923 – 22 May 2013) was a noted sculptor from the Rajasthan state of India. She studied sculpture at the Regent Street Polytechnic in London. She has published a collection of her poems "Song & Sculpture". Her work was the subject of numerous exhibitions.

== Career ==
Usha Rani's career as a sculptor was sparked by a chance encounter soon after her graduation with an MA in philosophy from St. Stephen's. She saw a sculpture class at the Delhi Polytechnic and was immediately seduced. An illness soon afterwards resulted in a long period of rest but this enforced hibernation allowed her to submerge herself in books on sculpture. After the theoretical absorption came the practical – years spent at the Regent Street Polytechnic in London between 1949 and 1954. She frequented Jacob Epstein's Saturday open house and was introduced to the Paris studio of Brancusi.

== Life ==
She married Bhupendra Hooja in 1949. Back in India, the family arrived in Jaipur in 1959 where Usha Rani has devoted her long life to creating works, human and accessible even when in abstract or larger than life-size. Adventurous in the use of new techniques and materials, she has worked in bronze, iron, fibre-glass, concrete, stone, plaster of Paris and scrap metal with initial modeling done in clay, bridging the gap between classical Indian sculpture and modern trends. She was made a Fellow of Rajasthan Lalit Kala Akademi in 1990 and received a National Award from the FIE Foundation of Ichalkaranji for Excellence in Sculpture in 1993. In many Indian cities, and in particular Jaipur, Usha Rani's monumental public works have become familiar landmarks. Examples include the Police Memorial in Jaipur and the Garud (Eagle) in Kota.

== Awards ==
- Rajasthan Lalit Kala Akademi Fellowship. 1990;
- Rajasthan Shree Award 1982;
- Mewar Foundation Sajjan Singh Award 1985:
- Veteran artist AIFACS Award, 1988.
- FIE Foundation for Excellence in Sculpture in 1993.Ichalkaranji
