= Mazin Abu Kalal =

Iraqi politician

Mazin Abu Kalal (died May 5, 2013) was an Iraqi politician.

== Death ==
On May 5, 2013, he was killed by a bomb.
