= Ludwig G. Strauss =

German physician (1949–2013)

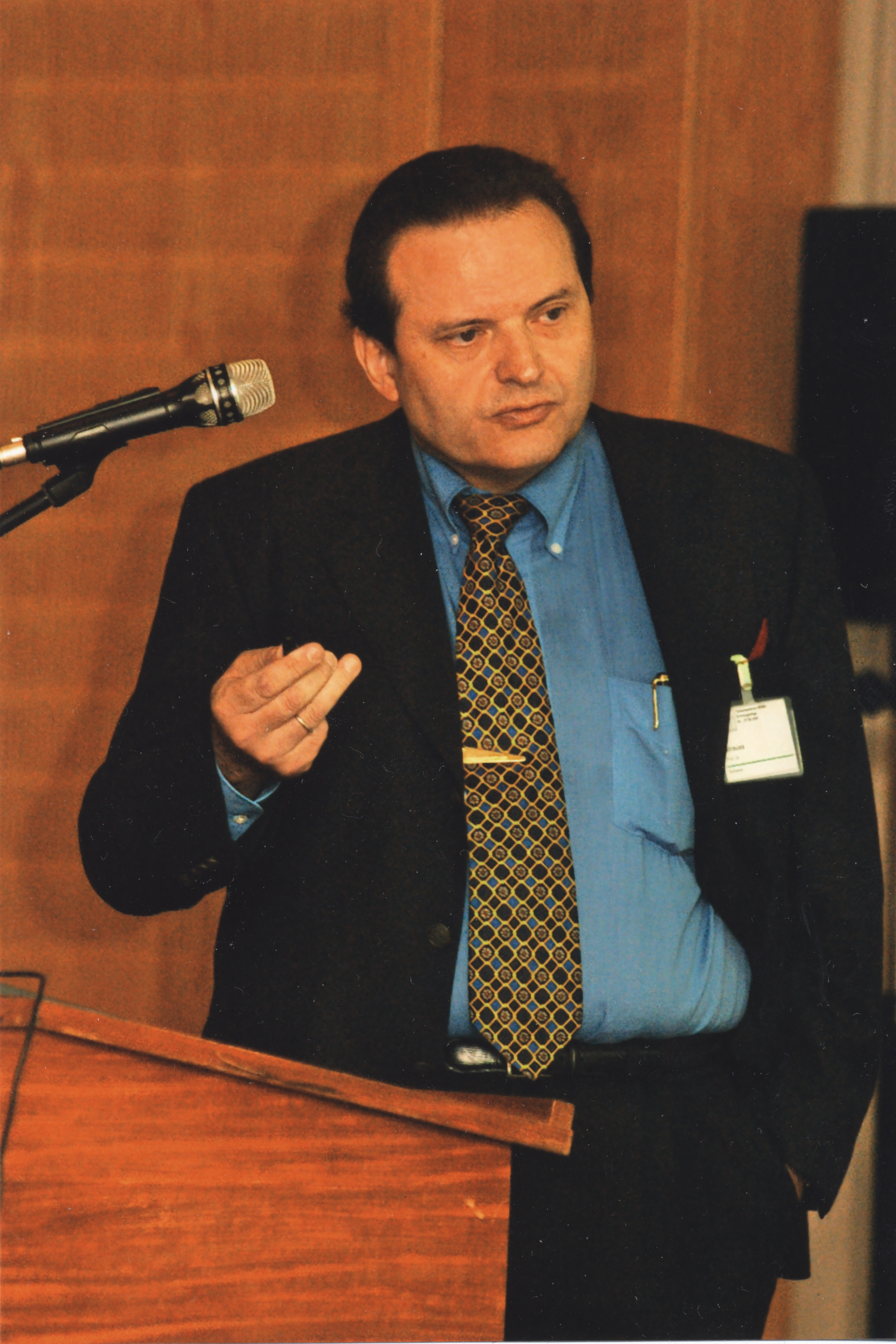
Ludwig Strauss

Ludwig Georg Strauss (5 July 1949 - 29 May 2013) was a German nuclear medicine physician and professor of radiology at the University of Heidelberg.

== Biography ==
Strauss studied medicine from 1969 to 1975 at the Justus Liebig University in Gießen and mathematics from 1973 to 1975 at the same university, receiving his medical degree in 1978. His doctoral thesis was on “Vergleichende Untersuchung verschiedener Radio-in-vitro-Tests zur Beurteilung der Schildrüsenfunktion unter Berücksichtigung mehrerer Parameter”.

Strauss was born in Worms, Germany. He died on 29 May 2013 due to cancer.
