= Tancred Melis =

South African cricketer (1934–2013)

Personal information
- Born: 18 February 1934; Kimberley, South Africa
- Died: 2 May 2013 (aged 79); Margate, KwaZulu-Natal, South Africa
- Source: ESPNcricinfo, 7 June 2016

Tancred Melis (18 February 1934 – 2 May 2013) was a South African cricketer. He played six first-class matches for Orange Free State between 1970 and 1973.
