= Nasser al-Rashed =

Kuwaiti squash player (1992–2013)

Nasser al-Rashed (22 July 1992 – May 15, 2013) was a Kuwaiti squash player. He was a several-time national champion. He died of a heart attack on May 15, 2013, allegedly after drinking four cans of an energy drink. He was 20.
