= John Birrell =

Scottish-Canadian businessman (1815-1875)

John Birrell (6 April 1815 – 12 February 1875) was a Scottish-Canadian businessman.

Born and raised in the Shetland Islands, Birrell emigrated to Canada about 1835 and had his first recorded employment in Hamilton, Ontario. He moved to London, Ontario about 1840 where he became a noted merchant and entrepreneur.

Birrell is noteworthy in Canadian history for his involvement in railways and finance.
