= Lord Lieutenant of Orkney =

Ceremonial officer in Orkney, Scotland

This is a list of people who have served as Lord-Lieutenant of Orkney.

- Patrick Neale Sutherland Graeme 8 April 1948 – 26 September 1958
- Robert Scarth 15 January 1959 – 18 May 1966
- Col Henry William Scarth of Breckness 29 July 1966 – 19 May 1972
- Col Sir Robert Macrae 2 August 1972 – 1990
- Brig Malcolm Dennison 26 April 1990 – 30 August 1996
- George Marwick 28 April 1997 – 2007
- Anthony Trickett 12 March 2007 – 2013
- James William (Bill) Spence 18 Feb 2014 – 20 January 2020
- Elizabeth Elaine Grieve (Elaine) 29 January 2020 – present
