= Gábor Gellért Kis =

Hungarian journalist and politician (1946–2013)

Member of the National Assembly
- In office 28 June 1994 – 17 June 1998

Personal details
- Born: 20 October 1946 Budapest, Hungary
- Died: 15 May 2013 (aged 66)
- Party: MSZMP (1969–1989); MSZP (1989–2001)
- Spouse: Mária Szabó
- Children: Borbála; Dániel
- Profession: journalist, college professor

Gábor Gellért Kis (20 October 1946 – 15 May 2013) was a Hungarian journalist, college professor and politician, member of the National Assembly (MP) for Monor (Pest County Constituency VII) between 1994 and 1998. He served as Chairman of the Committee on Human Rights, Minorities and Religious Affairs.
