= Taronda Spencer =

Taronda Elise Spencer (September 25, 1958 – May 17, 2013) was an American archivist. She worked in archives for over 20 years, most notably as the College Archivist and Historian at Spelman College until her death in 2013. She "was dedicated to, preserving the history of African American education in the United States and mentoring a new generation of archivists."

== Early life and education ==
Spencer was a native of New Orleans. She was born on September 25, 1958, to Albert Spencer Jr. and Emmanuella Julien Spencer, who was herself an archivist. She had three brothers, Rodney (Sandra) Spencer, Royzell (Ivelynn) Spencer, and Russell J. Spencer. She attended and graduated from John McDonogh #35 Senior High School in 1976.

Spencer attended Spelman College for her BA in history in 1980 on a full-ride scholarship. At Spelman, she was influenced by Millicent Dobbs Jordan and studied alongside Ernestine E. Brazeal. She later attended the University of New Orleans for her MA in History and Archives Administration in 1985. After graduating with her masters, she worked at the Amistad Research Center, where her mother was an assistant archivist, and later joined the staff of the New Orleans Historic Collection until 1991.

== Career ==
In 1989, Spencer became a charter member of the Academy of Certified Archivists and a certified archivist herself. In 1991, she left the New Orleans Historic Collection and traveled to Wayne State University to work as an archivist and survey archival and manuscript collections from 99 historically black colleges and universities (HBCUs). In 1994, she joined the Society of American Archivists and served in many capacities, including serving on the Committee on the Status of Women, the Harold T. Pinkett Minority Award Committee, the Nominating Committee, and Chair of the Archivists and Archives of Color Roundtable.

She began working at Spelman College in 1997 where she served as the college's first full-time archivist and was named the College Historian in 2000. She also served as the archivist for the National Alumnae of Spelman College and the Atlanta chapter. Beverly Guy-Sheftall, professor of women's studies and founding director of the Spelman College Women's Research and Resource Center, said of Spencer "Taronda’s job as the college archivist was unique...We were looking for someone who had the qualifications of a college archivist, but who would also work within the Women’s Center unit, because we were also interested in fostering research on African-American women.”

For fifteen years, Spencer was a member of the Society of Georgia Archivists and served in several capacities. She served on the Board of SGA and contributed to many of the Society's scholarship funds. In 2006, she brought the annual meeting to Spelman College.

She also served as an archival consultant for organizations and institutions such as the United Negro College Fund, Andrew W. Mellon Archival Research Institute, Children's Defense Fund, and Bennett College for Women in Greensboro, North Carolina. She was an active member of the HBCU Archives Institute.

In 1999, her article, "The Evolution of the Cooperative Historically Black Colleges and Universities Archival Survey Project," was published through the journal of the Society of Georgia Archivists. She also wrote the entry on Spelman College in the New Georgia Encyclopedia.

Throughout her career, she gave many lectures and presentations on Spelman's history and traditions, helped researchers and students in the archives, and was "known for her lively, passionate" nature in her work.

=== Awards ===
- Storyteller of the Year Awardee, 2013

== Death ==
On May 17, 2013, two days before Spelman's graduation ceremony, Taronda Spencer fell ill while at a Spelman function. Later that night, she suffered a massive heart attack and died at 54. In 2014, after her death, the Society of Georgia Archivists established the Taronda Spencer Award, "to honor her work in encouraging students at HBCUs and students of color to consider careers in the archival profession."
