= Harold A. Carter =

Harold A. Carter (1937-2013) was the senior pastor of New Shiloh Baptist Church in Baltimore, Maryland and a major religious leader in that city. He was also closely involved with Promise Keepers.

Carter was born in Selma, Alabama to Nathan Mitchell Carter a professor of New Testament at Selma University and his wife Lille Belle Hicks Carter, who was a school teacher before her marriage.

Carter went to Alabama State University with plans to go into law. However, after listening to Martin Luther King Jr. he decided to go into the ministry. Carter then studied at Crozer Theological Seminary. He later received doctorates from St. Mary's Seminary and University in Baltimore and Colgate Bexley Hall/Crozer Seminary.

Carter became a pastor at New Shiloh Baptist in Baltimore when he moved there in 1965. He worked as the Baltimore coordinator for the Poor Peoples Campaign.

Carter wrote The Prayer Tradition of Black People, seen as one of the best records of prayers given by African-Americans and their history.

Carter's wife, Weptanomah Bermuda Washington, was very much involved with New Shiloh as well, running the ladies ministry. She wrote nine books including The Black Minister's Wife.

The leadership of New Shiloh was eventually passed on to his son Harold A. Carter, Jr.

Carter used his Church as the basis of establishing educational ventures especially with vocational focuses.

Among the people who have been raised going to New Shiloh Baptist Church was Byron Pitts who spend some time speaking of Carter in his memoir.

== Sources ==
- Baltimore Sun Obituary for Carter
- New Shiloah bio of Carter
- Afro obituary for Carter
- Charles E. Booth, Bridging the Breach: Evangelical Thought and Liberation in the African-American Preaching Tradition
- Byron Pitts, Step Out on Nothing: How Faith and Family Helped Me Conquer Life's Challenges (2009), p. 27.
- CBS article on Carter being honored
