= Harold Whitfield (cricketer) =

South African cricketer (1919–2013)

Personal information
- Born: 2 February 1919; King William's Town, South Africa
- Died: 15 May 2013 (aged 94); East London, Eastern Cape, South Africa
- Source: ESPNcricinfo, 7 June 2016

Harold Whitfield (2 February 1919 – 15 May 2013) was a South African cricketer. He played 24 first-class matches for Border between 1936 and 1954.
