= Chob Yodkaew =

Thai economist and politician

Chob Yodkaew (died 1 May 2013) was a Thai economist and politician appointed Senator for the Southern region of Thailand.

He died of a stroke on May 1, 2013.

== See also ==
- Politics of Thailand
