= Arsen Chilingaryan =

Soviet Armenian footballer

Personal information
- Full name: Arsen Chilingaryan
- Date of birth: 12 October 1965
- Place of birth: Yerevan, USSR
- Date of death: 14 May 2013 (aged 50–51)
- Place of death: Grenoble, France
- Height: 1.78 m (5 ft 10 in)
- Position: Defender

Senior career*
Years	Team	Apps	(Gls)
1983	Olimpia Ashtarak	20	(2)
1984–1987	FC Ararat Yerevan	84	(2)
- * Club domestic league appearances and goals

Arsen Chilingaryan (Armenian: Արսեն Չիլինգարյան, 1965 - 14 May 2013) was a Soviet Armenian football defender.

== Biography ==
Chilingaryan was born in Yerevan. He made his debut in the Soviet Top League in 1984 for FC Ararat Yerevan. He managed Armenian clubs FC Van Yerevan, Gandzasar FC, FC Armavir, FC Kotayk, Ulisses FC and Armenia U-17. He died in Grenoble after a long illness.
