= Huang Yu =

Chinese film director, screenwriter and actor

Huang Yu (黃域)
- Born: November 7, 1916; Shanghai, Republic of China
- Died: May 24, 2013 (aged 96); Hong Kong
- Occupations: Film director; screenwriter; actor
- Spouse: Wu Pei-yung (吳佩蓉)

Chinese name
- Traditional Chinese: 黃域
- Simplified Chinese: 黄域
Transcriptions
Standard Mandarin
- Hanyu Pinyin: Huáng Yù

Huang Yu (7 November 1916 – 24 May 2013) was a Chinese film director, screenwriter and actor. His acting career began in Shanghai in the 1930s. In the 1940s he went to British Hong Kong and became a filmmaker with the left-wing Great Wall Movie Enterprises. He directed 29 films between 1953 and 1981.

His wife Wu Pei-yung (吳佩蓉) frequently worked on his films as script supervisor, screenwriter, actress, make-up artist, assistant director or co-director.

== Filmography ==
=== As actor ===
Year	English title	Original title	Role	Notes
1930	Regrettable Separation	惜紛飛	Xu Nanying	
1940	The West Chamber	西廂記	Yuan Weizhi	
1940	They Have Been Living Here for Generations	秦淮世家	Zhao Si	
1943	Reunion	重逢		
1944	The Wind	凱風		
1944	A Bright Future	鵬程萬里		
1945	Struggle	奮鬥		
1945	My Youthful Head	莫負少年頭		
1945	Modern Girl	摩登女性	Colleague	
1949	Our Husband	春雷	Uncle	also assistant director
1950	Hong Kong Mermaids	香島美人魚		
1951	Miss Du Jin	鍍金小姐		

=== As assistant director ===
- 1949: Our Husband (春雷)
- 1950: The Awful Truth (說謊世界)
- 1951: A Night-Time Wife (禁婚記)
- 1952: Nonya (娘惹)
- 1952: Unknown Father (不知道的父親)
- 1953: A Torn Lily (孽海花)
- 1954: Till We Meet Again (深閨夢裡人)

=== As director ===
Year	English title	Chinese title	Director	Writer	Notes
1953	The Gold-Plated Man	花花世界	Yes		
1955	The Inspector General	視察專員	Yes		
1956	Survivors of Love	大富之家	Yes		
1956	Apartment for Women	女子公寓	Yes		
1956	She Swallowed Her Sorrows	紅顏劫	Yes		
1957	Suspicion	捉鬼記	Yes		
1957	Whither Spring?	春歸何處	Yes		
1957	Princess Hibiscus	芙蓉仙子	Yes		
1958	Borrowed Wife	借親配	Yes		
1958	The Outsider	少年遊	Yes		
1960	A Mermaid's Love	碧波仙侶	Yes		
1960	Come On, Everybody!	飛燕迎春	Yes		
1962	Two Ideal Couples	糊塗姻緣	Yes		
1962	Love on the Edge	甜言蜜語	Yes		
1964	A Happy Reunion	龍鳳呈祥	Yes		
1965	A Pink Dream	粉紅色的夢	Yes		
1965	Emperor Takes a Holiday	皇帝出京	Yes		
1966	Embroidered Scarf	鴛鴦帕	Yes		
1966	A Time to Remember	小忽雷	Yes		
1968	Pillar of Society	社會棟樑	Yes		
1968	Love Song of Twins	雙女情歌	Yes		
1969	The Golden Age	金色年華	Yes		
1969	The Village of Crouching Tigers	臥虎村	Yes		
1970	Red Azalea	映山紅	Yes		
1971	The Younger Generation	小當家	Yes	Yes	
1974	A Silver Dollar	一塊銀元	Yes	Yes	
1976	The Best Friends	至愛親朋	Yes		
1979	The Reporter	鐵腳馬眼神仙肚	Yes		
1981	The Spy in the Palace	飛鳳潛龍	Yes		
