= Ron Weaver (TV producer) =

American television producer and author (1937–2013)

Ron Weaver (June 9, 1937 – May 11, 2013) was an American television producer and author. Weaver was born in Indiana. He was raised in Michigan and attended the Michigan State University. At a young age, he starred on several small-time television shows and radio stations. In the 1950s, he moved to New York and was taught by the actor Lee Strasberg. In New York, he was employed as a photographer and an actor. In 1983, he moved to Los Angeles and later worked for CBS as an associate producer in 1986, mainly working on the CBS soap, The Bold and the Beautiful. For his work, he was awarded three Emmys for Outstanding Drama Series. Weaver's first book is named Soul Mate, which was published in 2010. He is survived by his daughter, son and four grandchildren.
