= Harry Birrell =

Henry Walker Birrell (March 5, 1928 - May 25, 2013) was a news reporter and anchor, best known for his work at the Los Angeles radio station KNX 1070 AM. Birrell was born in Steubenville, Ohio, USA and graduated from Miami University. From a young age he wanted to be a newscaster and finally began his radio career in 1949 in Beaver Falls, Pennsylvania, working for several stations. Birrell joined KNX in 1968 and was shortly promoted to Ventura County correspondent. During his career, he won numerous Southern California Golden Mike awards. He retired in 1999 after being an anchor for 31 years at KNX. His son, Walker Birrell, confirmed that his father died from lung disease at the age of 85.
