= Jack Makari =

Lebanese-American cancer immunologist

- Born: December 23, 1917; Enfeh, Lebanon
- Died: May 4, 2013 (aged 95)
- Citizenship: American
- Education: American University of Beirut
- Occupations: Immunologist and researcher
- Spouse: Odette Tamer

Jack G. Makari (December 23, 1917 – May 4, 2013) was a Lebanese-American cancer immunologist. He is known for the development of several cancer tests, including the Makari Intradermal Cancer Test. During his career, he taught and conducted research at institutions including Harvard University, the University of Texas, and Johns Hopkins, and he was the founder of the Makari Research Laboratories.

== Early life ==
Jack G. Makari was born on December 23, 1917, in Enfeh, Lebanon, and received his medical degree in 1941 from the Medical School of the American University of Beirut, Lebanon, where he served as a professor until 1945. He became a naturalized citizen of the United States in 1959.

== Career ==
Between 1945 and 1947, Makari was a British Council scholar at the Royal College of Physicians & Surgeons in England. Beginning in 1947, Makari served as a senior physician and director of the hospital laboratory to the Trans-Arabian Pipeline Hospital in Beirut, Lebanon, where he pursued research into subject matters including intradermal testing for infectious diseases like malaria and hepatitis. He remained there until 1950, when he became a World Health Organization fellow at Harvard University Medical School until 1951 and received a Masters of Public Health from Harvard in 1953.

Between 1952 and 1953, Makari was a fellow in medicine at the Biological Division of Johns Hopkins Hospital. He continued at Hopkins as a researcher from 1953 to 1954 while simultaneously working as a physician at the Baltimore City Hospital. He then moved to the University of Texas, where from 1954 to 1956 he was an associate professor of immunology, while also working as an immunologist at the M. D. Anderson Hospital & Tumor Institute. From 1957 to 1963, he served as the director of research at the Muhlenberg Hospital in Muhlenberg, New Jersey, earning his license to practice medicine in the State of New Jersey in 1962, before directing a cancer clinic at that hospital in 1963. From that point forward he worked as the director of the Makari Research Laboratories located in New Jersey. Over his career he became a member of the New York Academy of Sciences, the American Association for the Advancement of Science, and the Royal Society of Medicine in London.

== Research ==
In 1955, he presented his research on a cancer test based on a cancer specific antigen used with a modified Schultz-Dale Reaction, at the annual meeting of the American Association of Bacteriologists and Pathologists, and his development of a Tumor Skin Test and cancer blood test were presented in 1958. In 1965, a five-year preliminary study of the Skin Tumor Test was presented at the New York Academy of Sciences. This work led to the development of the Makari Intradermal Cancer Test, which over the next decade was studied by researchers in the United Kingdom, Japan, and Germany, among others, and was approved for licensure in the UK in 1982 after testing. In 1988, he received a US patent on the test.

Makari also pursued research into the possibility that viruses may be associated with cancer, such as the Marek's disease herpes virus in chickens. He published in journals including Nature, the British Medical Journal, and the Annals of the New York Academy of Sciences, among others.

== Personal life ==
Makari was married to Odette Tamer in 1955, with whom he had three children. Makari died on May 4, 2013.
