= José María Pérez Gay =

Mexican academic, writer, translator and diplomat

José María Pérez Gay (February 15, 1944 – May 26, 2013) was a Mexican academic, writer, translator and diplomat. Some of his best known writings include El imperio perdido, La profecia de la memoria: ensayos alemanes and El principe y sus guerrilleros. He also founded Channel 22 (XEIMT-TV) and served as the television station's director. He later became an adviser to Andrés Manuel López Obrador during his time as a presidential candidate.

Pérez Gay was born in 1944 in Mexico City. He received a degree in information science at Universidad Iberoamericana and a doctorate from Free University of Berlin in German literature.

Pérez Gay served as the ambassador of Mexico to Portugal from 2001 to 2003. He had previously served as a cultural attache to Germany, Austria and France.

In 1996, Pérez Gay received the National Journalism Prize for Cultural Reporting. He was also the recipient of the Order of Merit of the Federal Republic of Germany and the Austria Cross of Honour for Science and Art.

José María Pérez Gay died in Mexico City at 2:05 a.m. on May 26, 2013, at the age of 69.
