= List of Aberdeen F.C. players =

Aberdeen F.C. is a Scottish professional football club based in Aberdeen, Scotland. The club was founded in 1903 after an amalgamation of three local clubs; Orion F.C., Victoria United and the original Aberdeen FC. The club has played at Pittodrie Stadium since 1903. They are one of the most successful clubs in Scotland, having won four League championships and thirteen domestic trophies, as well as the European Cup Winners' Cup and UEFA Super Cup in 1983.

More than 200 players have made at least 100 appearances (including substitute appearances); those players are listed here. Other players who have made fewer appearances are also included where they are regarded as having played a significant role for the club, with the reason for their inclusion indicated in the Notes column. The club's record appearance maker is Willie Miller, who played 797 games for Aberdeen between 1972 and his retirement in 1990. Joe Harper is the club's top goalscorer with 199 goals in major competitions.

== Notable players ==
Players are listed according to the date of their first team début for the club. Appearances and goals are for competitive first-team matches in Scottish League, Scottish Cup, Scottish League Cup and European Competition only; minor competitions (i.e. the Aberdeenshire Cup) and wartime matches are excluded. Substitute appearances are included.

Positions key

GK	Goalkeeper	DF	Defender	MF	Midfielder	FW	Forward

Aberdeen Hall of Fame Inductee Player currently contracted at Aberdeen

Statistics correct as of match played on 28 May 2023

List of Aberdeen F.C. players with at least 100 appearances or otherwise stated notability
Name	Nat	Pos	Aberdeen years	League	Scottish Cup	League Cup	Europe	Total	Goals	Notes
Henry Low	(Scotland)	MF	1903–1907	96	7	N/A	N/A	103	23	—
Tom Strang	(Scotland)	DF	1903–1907	96	8	N/A	N/A	104	3	—
Rab Macfarlane	(Scotland)	GK	1904–1908	112	11	N/A	N/A	123	0	—
Alex Halkett	(Scotland)	MF	1904–1909	117	12	N/A	N/A	129	2	—
Wilf Low	(Scotland)	DF	1904–1916	107	12	N/A	N/A	119	3	—
Willie Lennie	(Scotland)	MF	1905–1913	228	24	N/A	N/A	252	67	(Note: First Aberdeen player capped by Scotland)
Stewart Davidson	(Scotland)	DF	1905–1917; 1923–1924	136	17	N/A	N/A	153	1	—
Charles O'Hagan	(Ireland)	FW	1906–1910	99	13	N/A	N/A	112	24	(Note: The first Aberdeen player to win a cap for his country.)
George Wilson	(Scotland)	DF	1907–1914	181	13	N/A	N/A	194	14	—
Donald Colman	(Scotland)	DF	1907–1920	323	23	N/A	N/A	346	1	—
Jock Hume	(Scotland)	DF	1907–1920	282	23	N/A	N/A	305	3	—
Jimmy Soye	(Scotland)	FW	1909–1915	185	14	N/A	N/A	201	25	—
Paddy Travers	(Scotland)	FW	1910–1911; 1912–1914	97	7	N/A	N/A	104	24	—
Jock Wyllie	(Scotland)	DF	1910–1920	169	13	N/A	N/A	182	28	—
Davie Main	(Scotland)	FW	1911–1917	158	8	N/A	N/A	163	58	—
Joseph Walker	(Scotland)	FW	1911–1917	133	6	N/A	N/A	139	25	—
Bobby Hannah	(Scotland)	DF	1911–1921	116	11	N/A	N/A	127	1	—
Dod Brewster	(Scotland)	MF	1913–1920	119	0	N/A	N/A	119	9	—
Alex Wright	(Scotland)	MF	1913–1922	126	16	N/A	N/A	142	11	—
Arthur Robertson	(Scotland)	MF	1913–1923	96	8	N/A	N/A	104	6	—
Bobby Archibald	(Scotland)	MF	1914–1920	109	4	N/A	N/A	113	16	—
Willie Wylie	(Scotland)	FW	1914–1920	119	3	N/A	N/A	122	12	—
George Anderson	(Scotland)	GK	1914–1922	205	8	N/A	N/A	213	0	—
Bert MacLachlan	(Scotland)	DF	1914–1927	315	43	N/A	N/A	358	16	—
Walter Grant	(Scotland)	MF	1915–1924	91	9	N/A	N/A	100	12	—
Jacky Connon	(Scotland)	FW	1919–1923	93	13	N/A	N/A	106	25	—
Jock Hutton	(Scotland)	DF	1919–1927	239	41	N/A	N/A	280	17	—
Billy Middleton	(England)	FW	1920–1923	110	16	N/A	N/A	126	8	—
Vic Milne	(Scotland)	DF	1920–1923	110	12	N/A	N/A	122	7	—
Douglas Thomson	(Scotland)	FW	1920–1923	95	12	N/A	N/A	107	33	—
Andy Rankine	(Scotland)	FW	1920–1925	136	22	N/A	N/A	158	38	—
Matt Forsyth	(Scotland)	DF	1920–1926	161	24	N/A	N/A	185	0	—
Jimmy Smith	(Scotland)	MF	1922–1931	297	39	N/A	N/A	336	64	—
Johnny Miller	(Scotland)	FW	1921–1927	109	15	N/A	N/A	124	61	—
Harry Blackwell	(England)	GK	1921–1930	216	36	N/A	N/A	252	0	—
Duff Bruce	(Scotland)	DF	1923–1928	95	15	N/A	N/A	110	0	—
Robert Bruce	(Scotland)	FW	1924–1928	94	16	N/A	N/A	110	45	—
Jock Edward	(Scotland)	DF	1924–1928	87	16	N/A	N/A	103	3	—
Alec Cheyne	(Scotland)	FW	1925–1930	126	11	N/A	N/A	137	55	—
Willie Jackson	(Scotland)	DF	1925–1932	183	23	N/A	N/A	206	8	—
Bob McDermid	(Scotland)	FW	1925–1932	246	27	N/A	N/A	273	48	—
Andy Love	(Scotland)	FW	1925–1934	216	22	N/A	N/A	238	83	—
Jimmy Black	(Scotland)	DF	1927–1932	155	15	N/A	N/A	170	4	—
Benny Yorston	(Scotland)	FW	1927–1932	143	13	N/A	N/A	156	125	(Note: Record for most goals in one season (46))
Eddie Falloon	(Ireland)	DF	1927–1938	223	26	N/A	N/A	249	6	—
Willie Cooper	(Scotland)	DF	1927–1948 (Note: Made additional appearances in 1939–40 and/or 1945–46 which are counted in normal league tallies in the source.)	328	37	9	N/A	374	3	—
Frank Hill	(Scotland)	DF	1928–1932	98	8	N/A	N/A	106	10	—
Hugh McLaren	(Scotland)	DF	1928–1932	105	10	N/A	N/A	115	5	—
Steve Smith	(Scotland)	GK	1930–1937	234	24	N/A	N/A	258	0	—
Dave Warnock	(Scotland)	FW	1930–1939	133	17	N/A	N/A	150	40	—
Bob Fraser	(Scotland)	MF	1931–1938	194	21	N/A	N/A	215	4	—
Charlie McGill	(Scotland)	DF	1931–1938	218	22	N/A	N/A	240	1	—
Matt Armstrong	(Scotland)	FW	1931–1946**	195	24	N/A	N/A	232	158	—
Jackie Benyon	(Wales)	MF	1932–1937	126	14	N/A	N/A	140	37	—
Willie Mills	(Scotland)	FW	1932–1938	182	28	N/A	N/A	210	114	—
George Thomson	(Scotland)	MF	1932–1939	213	31	N/A	N/A	244	20	—
Johnny McKenzie	(Scotland)	FW	1935–1938	107	12	N/A	N/A	119	21	—
Bill Strauss	(South Africa)	MF	1936–1945	85	14	N/A	N/A	99	56	—
Frank Dunlop	(Scotland)	DF	1936–1948	112	20	N/A	N/A	132	1	—
George Johnstone	(Scotland)	GK	1936–1949	150	25	24	N/A	199	0	—
George Taylor	(Scotland)	MF	1937–1948	63	8	11	N/A	82	6	—
George Hamilton	(Scotland)	FW	1937–1954	200	32	48	N/A	284	153	—
Andy Cowie	(Scotland)	MF	1938–1948	60	8	16	N/A	84	0	—
Stan Williams	(South Africa)	FW	1938–1949	72	19	17	N/A	99	34	—
Pat McKenna	(Scotland)	DF	1944–1952	133	17	28	N/A	178	0	—
Archie Baird	(Scotland)	MF	1946–1953	104	16	23	N/A	144	35	—
Tony Harris	(Scotland)	MF	1946–1953	188	31	54	N/A	273	30	—
Harry Yorston	(Scotland)	FW	1947–1957	202	29	47	N/A	278	141	—
Archie Glen	(Scotland)	MF	1947–1960	203	24	43	N/A	270	27	—
Don Emery	(Wales)	DF	1948–1952	89	11	25	N/A	125	25	—
Chris Anderson	(Scotland)	DF	1948–1953	71	13	19	N/A	103	1	(Note: Anderson went on to become a director at Aberdeen in 1967, and played a significant role in the club's rise to prominence over the following 20 years.)
Tommy Pearson	(Scotland)	MF	1948–1953	85	14	17	N/A	116	16	—
Jack Hather	(England)	FW	1948–1960	264	34	53	N/A	351	105	—
Alec Young	(Scotland)	DF	1950–1958	168	23	30	N/A	221	1	—
Fred Martin	(Scotland)	GK	1950–1959	208	33	52	N/A	293	0	—
Paddy Buckley	(Scotland)	FW	1952–1957	107	20	26	N/A	153	90	—
Jack Allister	(Scotland)	MF	1952–1958	117	21	25	N/A	163	23	—
Jimmy Mitchell	(Scotland)	DF	1952–1958	129	21	34	N/A	184	0	—
Bob Wishart	(Scotland)	FW	1952–1961	177	22	36	N/A	235	62	—
Graham Leggat	(Scotland)	MF	1953–1958	109	16	26	N/A	151	92	—
David Caldwell	(Scotland)	DF	1953–1960	132	16	30	N/A	178	0	—
Jim Clunie	(Scotland)	DF	1953–1960	104	16	21	N/A	141	9	—
George Mulhall	(Scotland)	FW	1953–1962	110	9	31	N/A	150	42	—
Jimmy Hogg	(Scotland)	DF	1953–1965	214	22	43	N/A	279	1	—
Norrie Davidson	(Scotland)	FW	1955–1961	109	14	23	N/A	146	84	—
Ken Brownlee	(Scotland)	MF	1955–1963	109	14	23	N/A	146	39	—
Dickie Ewen	(Scotland)	MF	1957–1961	82	13	11	N/A	106	24	—
John Ogston	(Scotland)	GK	1957–1965	179	17	34	N/A	230	0	—
Ian Burns	(Scotland)	MF	1957–1966	142	16	34	N/A	192	6	—
Billy Little	(Scotland)	FW	1957–1968	237	23	45	1	306	96	—
George Kinnell	(Scotland)	MF	1959–1964	130	12	23	N/A	165	25	—
Ernie Winchester	(Scotland)	FW	1959–1967	123	15	30	N/A	168	93	—
Doug Coutts	(Scotland)	DF	1960–1964	98	10	13	N/A	121	4	—
Charlie Cooke	(Scotland)	MF	1960–1965	125	14	26	N/A	165	30	—
Dave Bennett	(Scotland)	DF	1960–1966	111	12	16	N/A	139	0	—
Ally Shewan	(Scotland)	DF	1960–1969	220	26	46	8	300	9	—
Dave Smith	(Scotland)	MF	1961–1966	133	14	19	N/A	166	13	—
Henning Boel	(Denmark)	DF	1964–1974	105	17	22	6	150	4	—
Jim Whyte	(Scotland)	DF	1965–1970	105	20	24	4	152	8	—
Jimmy Wilson	(Scotland)	FW	1965–1967	75	11	20	4	110	34	—
Jim Smith	(Scotland)	MF	1965–1969	103	14	15	8	140	37	—
Jens Petersen	(Denmark)	DF	1965–1970	141	22	31	7	201	11	—
Tommy McMillan	(Scotland)	DF	1965–1972	172	23	45	8	248	2	—
Jim Hermiston	(Scotland)	DF	1965–1975	195	15	45	15	270	16	—
Davie Robb	(Scotland)	FW	1965–1978	251	27	32	21	345	99	—
Bobby Clark	(Scotland)	GK	1965–1980	424	49	95	23	591	0	—
Martin Buchan	(Scotland)	DF	1966–1972	133	20	23	12	188	11	—
Ian Taylor	(Scotland)	FW	1966–1974	109	9	27	11	156	28	—
George Murray	(Scotland)	DF	1967–1973	89	11	20	7	127	4	—
Jim Forrest	(Scotland)	FW	1968–1973	128	20	27	11	186	62	—
Derek McKay	(Scotland)	FW	1969–1971	15	3	0	1	19	4	(Note: Known as "Cup-tie McKay"; scored four goals in the 1970 Scottish Cup, including two in the final.)
Joe Harper	(Scotland)	FW	1969–1973; 1976–1981	207	24	53	16	300	199	(Note: Club record goalscorer (199 goals))
Alex Willoughby	(Scotland)	MF	1969–1974	103	9	27	10	149	15	—
Billy Williamson	(Scotland)	MF	1969–1976	95	9	23	0	127	23	—
Willie Young	(Scotland)	DF	1969–1976	133	12	32	11	188	14	—
Steve Murray	(Scotland)	MF	1970–1973	101	10	22	7	140	25	—
Arthur Graham	(Scotland)	MF	1970–1977	220	22	44	11	297	45	—
Chic McLelland	(Scotland)	DF	1972–1979	157	17	35	6	212	5	—
Joe Smith	(Scotland)	MF	1972–1979	142	12	34	3	191	11	—
Drew Jarvie	(Scotland)	FW	1972–1982	275	28	66	17	386	130	—
John McMaster	(Scotland)	MF	1972–1986	206	28	54	28	316	12	—
Willie Miller	(Scotland)	DF	1972–1990	561	66	109	61	797	32	(Note: Record appearances (797 in all major competitions, 561 in league))
Eddie Thomson	(Scotland)	DF	1973–1976	91	6	20	4	121	2	—
Duncan Davidson	(Scotland)	FW	1974–1981	78	16	15	3	112	28	—
Willie Garner	(Scotland)	DF	1975–1981	113	11	31	6	161	3	—
Doug Rougvie	(Scotland)	DF	1975–1984	180	26	45	28	279	21	—
Dom Sullivan	(Scotland)	MF	1976–1979	97	12	21	7	137	14	—
Stuart Kennedy	(Scotland)	DF	1976–1983	223	29	55	26	333	9	—
Alex McLeish	(Scotland)	DF	1976–1994	494	68	74	56	692	30	(Note: Record international appearances whilst with Aberdeen (77))
Steve Archibald	(Scotland)	FW	1977–1980	76	10	18	6	110	46	—
Andy Watson	(Scotland)	MF	1977–1983	99	12	13	12	136	17	—
Gordon Strachan	(Scotland)	MF	1977–1984	183	29	43	34	292	90	—
Ian Scanlon	(Scotland)	MF	1978–1981	93	11	18	10	132	20	—
Jim Leighton	(Scotland)	GK	1978–1988; 1997–2000	385	48	54	48	535	0	—
Neil Simpson	(Scotland)	MF	1978–1989	205	34	34	37	310	31	—
Mark McGhee	(Scotland)	FW	1979–1984	164	20	35	31	250	100	—
Dougie Bell	(Scotland)	MF	1979–1985	109	22	29	25	185	14	—
John Hewitt	(Scotland)	FW	1979–1989	241	33	46	43	363	90	—
Eric Black	(Scotland)	FW	1981–1986	115	35	18	22	180	70	—
Neale Cooper	(Scotland)	DF	1980–1986	133	27	27	33	220	10	—
Ian Angus	(Scotland)	MF	1980–1987	84	15	10	11	120	12	—
Peter Weir	(Scotland)	MF	1981–1987	159	19	29	30	237	38	—
Willie Falconer	(Scotland)	FW	1982–1988	78	5	9	10	102	17	—
Stewart McKimmie	(Scotland)	DF	1983–1997	430	45	47	39	561	9	—
Billy Stark	(Scotland)	MF	1983–1987	112	12	14	11	149	59	—
Frank McDougall	(Scotland)	FW	1984–1986	53	6	6	3	69	44	(Note: McDougall was the top-scorer in the Scottish Premier Division in season 1984–85)
Joe Miller	(Scotland)	FW	1984–1987; 1993–1998	206	20	24	14	264	47	—
Brian Grant	(Scotland)	MF	1984–1996	265	27	25	15	332	32	—
Jim Bett	(Scotland)	MF	1985–1994	258	27	32	21	338	48	—
Brian Irvine	(Scotland)	DF	1985–1997	307	30	26	20	383	40	—
David Robertson	(Scotland)	DF	1985–1991	135	10	21	11	177	3	—
Robert Connor	(Scotland)	MF	1986–1994	206	18	22	17	263	22	—
Charlie Nicholas	(Scotland)	FW	1987–1990	77	16	8	3	104	36	—
Stephen Wright	(Scotland)	DF	1987–1995	150	13	12	6	181	2	—
Eoin Jess	(Scotland)	MF	1987–1996; 1997–2001	312	23	34	11	380	94	—
Theo Snelders	(Netherlands)	GK	1988–1996	227	20	29	14	290	0	—
Paul Mason	(England)	MF	1988–1993	158	12	15	8	193	37	—
Hans Gillhaus	(Netherlands)	FW	1989–1992	84	6	5	5	100	31	—
Scott Booth	(Scotland)	FW	1989–1997; 2003–2004	184	20	17	8	229	70	—
Paul Kane	(Scotland)	MF	1991–1995	119	10	7	5	141	13	—
Gary Smith	(Scotland)	DF	1991–1996; 1997–1999	209	18	19	3	249	2	—
Mixu Paatelainen	(Finland)	FW	1992–1994	85	9	6	3	93	28	—
Duncan Shearer	(Scotland)	FW	1992–1997	152	18	15	9	194	79	—
Stephen Glass	(Scotland)	MF	1994–1998	109	9	10	3	131	13	—
John Inglis	(Scotland)	DF	1994–1998	100	6	12	4	121	5	—
Billy Dodds	(Scotland)	FW	1994–1999	141	9	16	8	172	67	—
David Rowson	(Scotland)	MF	1994–2001	133	7	9	7	156	11	—
Paul Bernard	(Scotland)	MF	1995–2001	98	11	10	2	121	8	(Note: Highest transfer fee paid (£1 million))
Darren Young	(Scotland)	MF	1995–2003	132	9	8	10	159	6	—
Ryan Esson	(Scotland)	GK	1996–2006	89	5	4	2	100	0	—
Derek Young	(Scotland)	MF	1996–2003; 2007–2011	205	22	15	11	253	22	—
Russell Anderson	(Scotland)	DF	1996–2007; 2012–2015	343	30	25	9	407	20	—
Michael Hart	(Scotland)	DF	1997–2000; 2003–2008	113	9	7	6	145	0	—
Derek Whyte	(Scotland)	DF	1997–2002	133	12	8	1	154	0	—
Chris Clark	(Scotland)	MF	1997–2008; 2011–2014	233	22	14	9	278	13	—
Robbie Winters	(Scotland)	FW	1998–2002	132	11	7	2	152	45	—
Kevin McNaughton	(Scotland)	DF	1998–2006	175	13	9	5	202	3	—
Darren Mackie	(Scotland)	FW	1998–2012	314	22	19	10	365	69	—
Jamie McAllister	(Scotland)	DF	1999–2003	117	15	8	4	144	1	—
Phil McGuire	(Scotland)	DF	1999–2005	153	14	8	6	181	10	—
David Preece	(England)	GK	1999–2005	89	10	7	0	106	0	—
Ricky Foster	(Scotland)	DF	2001–2012	235	19	11	9	274	9	—
Zander Diamond	(Scotland)	DF	2002–2011	205	23	13	8	249	19	—
Andrew Considine	(Scotland)	DF	2003–2022	444	49	34	44	571	41	—
Scott Severin	(Scotland)	MF	2004–2009	166	13	8	8	195	12	—
Barry Nicholson	(Scotland)	MF	2005–2008	102	9	7	7	125	21	—
Jamie Smith	(Scotland)	MF	2005–2009	85	7	6	4	102	18	—
Chris Maguire	(Scotland)	FW	2005–2011	131	14	7	6	158	22	—
Jamie Langfield	(Scotland)	GK	2005–2015	278	26	16	16	336	0	—
Lee Miller	(Scotland)	FW	2006–2010	120	11	5	9	145	33	—
Sone Aluko	(Nigeria)	MF	2007–2011	102	14	4	7	127	13	—
Peter Pawlett	(Scotland)	MF	2008–2017	172	15	14	12	213	20	—
Josh Magennis	(Northern Ireland)	FW	2010–2014	105	10	8	0	122	12	—
Scott Vernon	(England)	FW	2010–2014	128	15	13	0	158	44	—
Ryan Jack	(Scotland)	MF	2010–2017	199	16	17	18	250	11	—
Jonny Hayes	(Republic of Ireland)	MF	2012–2017; 2020–2024	278	18	23	33	352	38	—
Niall McGinn	(Northern Ireland)	FW	2012–2017; 2018–2022	269	32	20	27	358	87	—
Mark Reynolds	(Scotland)	DF	2012–2019	186	19	16	16	237	7	—
Willo Flood	(Republic of Ireland)	MF	2013–2016	80	4	7	13	104	3	—
Ashton Taylor	(Wales)	DF	2014–2017; 2019–2021	145	11	5	17	178	12	—
Shay Logan	(England)	DF	2014–2021	224	21	17	32	294	15	—
Adam Rooney	(Republic of Ireland)	FW	2014–2018	151	15	11	20	197	88	—
Kenny McLean	(Scotland)	MF	2015–2018	126	10	7	15	158	25	—
Graeme Shinnie	(Scotland)	DF	2015–2019 2023-	194	18	16	24	252	17	—
Joe Lewis	(England)	GK	2016–2023	208	22	14	27	271	0	—
Scott McKenna	(Scotland)	DF	2014–2020	91	12	5	10	118	5	—
Lewis Ferguson	(Scotland)	MF	2018–2022	132	15	5	17	169	37	—
Sam Cosgrove	(England)	FW	2018–2021	79	11	5	8	103	47	—
Connor McLennan	(Scotland)	FW	2016–2023	86	10	5	7	108	8	—
Ross McCrorie	(Scotland)	MF	2020–2023	92	6	8	9	115	8	—
