= List of Aberdeen F.C. seasons =

This is a list of the seasons played by Aberdeen Football Club from 1903 to the present day. It details the club's achievements in major competitions, and the top league goalscorers for each season. Records of minor competitions such as the Aberdeenshire Cup and Northern League are not included.

The club has been crowned Scottish league champions four times, most recently in 1985. In addition, Aberdeen has won eight Scottish Cup titles, the Scottish League Cup six times, and both the European Cup Winners' Cup and European Super Cup once each.

== History ==
The club was formed in 1903 after an amalgamation of three Aberdeen-based football clubs, Orion, Aberdeen and Victoria United. An application to join the Scottish Football League in 1903 was defeated in a vote of member clubs, so the club spent its first season in the Northern League. In 1904, Aberdeen was elected to the Second Division. Despite finishing seventh, they were elected to the First Division in time for the 1905–06 season, where they have remained since, having never been relegated.

Aberdeen have finished bottom of the league on two occasions, in 1916–17 and 1999–2000; in 1917, they withdrew from the league due to World War I before returning in 1919, and in 2000, they avoided a play-off against the second and third-placed teams in the First Division because Falkirk's ground did not comply with SPL regulations and they could thus not compete in a play-off.

In 1983, Aberdeen became the second Scottish club to win the European Cup Winners' Cup, defeating Real Madrid in the final. Later that year, they became the first and so far only Scottish club to win the European Super Cup, after beating Hamburger SV 2–0 over two legs.

== Seasons ==
Season	League									Scottish Cup	League Cup (Note: The League Cup competition did not begin until the 1946–47 season.)	Europe (Note: European club competitions did not begin until the 1955–56 season.)		Top league goalscorer(s)	
Season	Division	Pld	W	D	L	GF	GA	Pts	Pos	Scottish Cup	League Cup	Europe		Player(s)	Goals
1904–05	Sco Div 2	22	7	7	8	36	26	21	7th	R3				Tom Ruddiman	7
1905–06	Sco Div 1 (Note: Despite only finishing 7th, Aberdeen were promoted due to a reordering of the league system.)	30	8	8	14	37	49	24	12th	R2				George McNicol	9
1906–07	Sco Div 1	34	10	10	14	48	55	30	11th	R1				Willie Lennie	9
1907–08	Sco Div 1	34	13	9	12	45	44	35	8th	SF				Thomas Murray	14
1908–09	Sco Div 1	34	15	6	13	61	53	36	7th	R2				Willie Lennie	12
1909–10	Sco Div 1	34	16	8	10	44	29	40	4th	R3				Bobby Simpson	10
1910–11	Sco Div 1	34	19	10	5	53	28	40	2nd	SF				Angus McIntosh	16
1911–12	Sco Div 1	34	14	7	13	44	44	35	9th	R3				Dave Main	12
1912–13	Sco Div 1	34	14	9	11	47	40	37	8th	R2				Dave Main	10
1913–14	Sco Div 1	38	10	10	18	38	55	30	14th	R3				Dave Main	9
1914–15	Sco Div 1	38	11	11	16	39	52	33	14th	(Note: The Scottish Cup was not held between 1914 and 1920 because of the first World War.)				Sam Cail	9
1915–16	Sco Div 1	38	11	12	15	51	64	34	11th	(Note: The Scottish Cup was not held between 1914 and 1920 because of the first World War.)				Davie Main	15
1916–17	Sco Div 1	38	7	7	24	36	68	21	20th	(Note: The Scottish Cup was not held between 1914 and 1920 because of the first World War.)				Harry Ambler	9
1917–19	Aberdeen dropped out of competitive football due to World War I. (Note: Scottish football was still held through the war, but due to a disastrous financial situation, Aberdeen (along with Dundee and Raith Rovers) had no choice but to drop out.)														
1919–20	Sco Div 1	42	11	13	18	46	64	35	17th	QF				Jacky Connon	14
1920–21	Sco Div 1	42	14	14	14	53	54	42	11th	R3				Peter Fisher	14
1921–22	Sco Div 1	42	13	9	20	48	54	35	15th	SF				Johnny Miller	23
1922–23	Sco Div 1	38	15	12	11	46	34	42	5th	QF (Note: In this cup, Aberdeen scored a record 13 goals in one match against Peterhead.)				Andy Rankine	14
1923–24	Sco Div 1	38	13	10	15	37	41	36	13th	SF				Johnny Miller	14
1924–25	Sco Div 1	38	11	10	17	46	56	32	15th	QF				Wattie Jackson	13
1925–26	Sco Div 1	38	13	10	15	49	54	36	11th	SF				Alec Reid	10
1926–27	Sco Div 1	38	13	14	11	73	72	40	8th	R2				Bobbie Bruce	20
1927–28	Sco Div 1	38	19	5	14	71	61	43	7th	R1				Benny Yorston	17
1928–29	Sco Div 1	38	16	8	14	81	68	40	7th	QF				Benny Yorston	23
1929–30	Sco Div 1	38	23	7	8	85	61	53	3rd	R3				Benny Yorston	38
1930–31	Sco Div 1	38	17	7	14	79	63	41	6th	QF				Benny Yorston	16
1931–32	Sco Div 1	38	16	9	13	57	49	41	7th	R1				Andy Love	12
1932–33	Sco Div 1	38	18	6	14	85	58	42	6th	R2				Paddy Moore	27
1933–34	Sco Div 1	38	18	8	12	90	57	44	5th	QF				Willie Mills	28
1934–35	Sco Div 1	38	17	10	11	68	54	44	6th	SF				Matt Armstrong	31
1935–36	Sco Div 1	38	26	9	3	96	50	61	3rd	QF				Matt Armstrong	30
1936–37	Sco Div 1	38	23	8	7	89	44	54	2nd	Final (Note: This was Aberdeen's first Scottish Cup final; they lost out to league champions Celtic 2–1 away from home.)				Matt Armstrong Billy Strauss	24
1937–38	Sco Div 1	38	15	9	14	74	59	39	6th	R3				Matt Armstrong	19
1938–39	Sco Div 1	38	20	6	12	91 (Note: This was the most league goals Aberdeen have ever scored in one season.)	61	46	3rd	SF				George Hamilton	17
1939–46	Competitive football cancelled due to World War II – Aberdeen won several regional competitions in the period.														
1946–47	Sco Div A (Note: The League was renamed to Division A.)	30	16	7	7	58	41	39	3rd	Winners (Note: Aberdeen won the Cup for the first time this season, defeating Hibernian 2–1 in the final at Hampden.)	Final (Note: In the first ever Scottish League Cup final, Aberdeen were comfortably beaten 4–0 at Ibrox Stadium by Rangers.)			George Hamilton	17
1947–48	Sco Div A	30	10	7	13	45	45	27	10th	R3	SF			Archie Kelly	10
1948–49	Sco Div A	30	7	11	12	39	48	25	13th	R1	Group			George Hamilton	10
1949–50	Sco Div A	30	11	4	15	48	56	26	8th	QF	Group			Harry Yorston	10
1950–51	Sco Div A	30	15	5	10	61	50	35	5th	QF	QF			Harry Yorston	18
1951–52	Sco Div A	30	10	7	13	65	58	27	11th	QF	Group			Harry Yorston	19
1952–53	Sco Div A	30	11	5	14	64	68	27	11th	Final	Group			George Hamilton Jack Hather	14
1953–54	Sco Div A	30	15	3	12	66	51	33	9th	Final	Group			Paddy Buckley	17
1954–55 (Note: This season saw Aberdeen's highest home attendance: 45,061 against Heart of Midlothian in March 1955.)	Sco Div A	30	24	1	5	73	26	49	1st (Note: This was Aberdeen's first ever league title, ahead of runners-up Celtic by three points. The European competitions began the following season, but Aberdeen were not given Scotland's place in the tournament, which went to Hibernian by special invitation.)	SF	Group			Paddy Buckley	17
1955–56	Sco Div A	34	18	10	6	87	50	46	2nd	R5 (Note: In 1955, the Scottish Cup was expanded to include amateur football teams as well as professional, expanding the competition to nine rounds.)	Winners (Note: This was Aberdeen's first League Cup win.)			Graham Leggat	19
1956–57	Sco Div 1 (Note: The league was again renamed, this time back to Division One.)	34	18	2	14	79	59	38	6th	R6	Group			Graham Leggat	12
1957–58	Sco Div 1	34	14	2	18	68	76	30	13th	QF (Note: The Cup system was again reorganised, this time to include only professional teams, and containing six rounds.)	QF			Norman Davidson	17
1958–59	Sco Div 1	34	12	5	17	63	66	29	13th	Final	Group			Billy Little	13
1959–60	Sco Div 1	34	11	6	17	54	72	28	15th	R2	Group			Norman Davidson	11
1960–61	Sco Div 1	34	14	8	12	72	72	36	6th	R3	Group			Ken Brownlee	18
1961–62	Sco Div 1	34	10	9	15	60	73	29	12th	R3	Group			Billy Little	17
1962–63	Sco Div 1	34	17	7	10	70	47	41	6th	QF	Group			Bobby Cummings	18
1963–64	Sco Div 1	34	12	8	14	53	53	32	9th	R3	Group			Ernie Winchester	16
1964–65 (Note: During this season, Aberdeen recorded a record 8–0 loss to Celtic in January.)	Sco Div 1	34	12	8	14	59	75	32	12th	R1	Group			Don Kerrigan	14
1965–66	Sco Div 1	34	15	6	13	61	54	36	8th	SF	Group			Ernie Winchester	16
1966–67	Sco Div 1	34	17	8	9	72	38	42	4th	Final	SF			Jimmy Wilson	13
1967–68	Sco Div 1	34	16	5	13	63	48	37	5th	R2	Group	Cup Winners' Cup	R2 (Note: In Aberdeen's first ever European tie, they beat Icelandic club KR Reykjavík 14–1 on aggregate, only to lose to Belgian side Standard Liège 3–2 on aggregate in the next round.)	Davy Johnston	14
1968–69	Sco Div 1	34	9	8	17	50	59	26	15th	SF	Group	Inter-Cities Fairs Cup	R2	Jim Forrest	16
1969–70	Sco Div 1	34	14	7	13	55	45	35	8th	Winners	QF			Davie Robb	16
1970–71	Sco Div 1	34	24	6	4	68	18	54	2nd	QF (Note: The Cup was again expanded, this time to seven rounds.)	Group	Cup Winners' Cup	R1 (Note: Aberdeen's first fixture of the tournament (against Hungarian club Honvéd) resulted in the first-ever penalty shoot-out in the cup's history, which Honvéd won 5–4 in Budapest.)	Joe Harper	19
1971–72	Sco Div 1	34	21	8	5	80	26	50	2nd	QF	Group	UEFA Cup	R2	Joe Harper	33
1972–73	Sco Div 1	34	16	11	7	61	34	43	4th	QF	SF	UEFA Cup	R1	Drew Jarvie	15
1973–74	Sco Div 1	34	13	16	5	46	26	42	4th	R3	QF	UEFA Cup	R2	Drew Jarvie	13
1974–75	Sco Div 1	34	16	9	9	66	43	41	5th	QF	Group	UEFA Cup	R1	Arthur Graham	11
1975–76	Prem (Note: The league was renamed to the Premier Division and reduced to ten teams; clubs faced each other four times in a season for the first time.)	36	11	10	15	49	50	32	7th	R4	Group			Jocky Scott	14
1976–77	Prem	36	16	11	9	56	42	43	3rd	R4	Winners (Note: The Cup format was changed to a straight knock-out competition because of criticism over the length of the original.)			Joe Harper	18
1977–78	Prem	36	22	9	5	68	29	53	2nd	Final	R3			Joe Harper	17
1978–79	Prem	36	13	14	9	59	36	40	4th	SF	Final	Cup Winners' Cup	R2	Joe Harper	19
1979–80	Prem	36	19	10	7	68	36	48	1st	SF	Final	UEFA Cup	R1	Steve Archibald Drew Jarvie	12
1980–81	Prem	36	19	11	6	61	26	49	2nd	R4	QF	European Cup	R2	Mark McGhee	13
1981–82	Prem	36	23	7	6	71	29	53	2nd	Winners	SF	UEFA Cup	R3	John Hewitt	11
1982–83	Prem	36	25	5	6	76	25	55	3rd	Winners (Note: This was Aberdeen's first double, consisting of the Scottish Cup and European Cup Winners' Cup.)	QF	Cup Winners' Cup	Winners (Note: This was Aberdeen's first European trophy, and the most well known; in the final, they beat Real Madrid 2–1 to take the title.)	Mark McGhee	16
1983–84	Prem	36	25	7	4	78	21	57	1st	Winners (Note: This was Aberdeen's first and only treble, consisting of the Scottish League, Scottish Cup and European Super Cup.)	SF	Cup Winners' Cup	SF	Mark McGhee Gordon Strachan	13
1983–84	Prem	36	25	7	4	78	21	57	1st	Winners	SF	Super Cup	Winners (Note: Aberdeen's first European Super Cup final resulted in a 2–0 home win over Hamburger SV after a goalless draw in Germany.)	Mark McGhee Gordon Strachan	13
1984–85	Prem	36	27	5	4	89	26	59	1st	SF	R2	European Cup	R1	Frank McDougall	22
1985–86	Prem	36	16	12	8	62	31	44	4th	Winners	Winners (Note: This was Aberdeen's first domestic double, consisting of the Scottish Cup and Scottish League Cup.)	European Cup	QF	Frank McDougall	14
1986–87	Prem	44	21	16	7	63	29	58	4th	R3	QF	Cup Winners' Cup	R1	Billy Stark	12
1987–88	Prem	44	21	17	6	56	25	59	4th	SF	Final	UEFA Cup	R2	Jim Bett	10
1988–89	Prem	36	18	14	4	51	25	50	2nd	R4	Final	UEFA Cup	R1	Charlie Nicholas	16
1989–90	Prem	36	17	10	9	56	33	44	2nd	Winners (Note: This was Aberdeen's second domestic double, consisting of the Scottish Cup and Scottish League Cup.)	Winners	UEFA Cup	R1	Charlie Nicholas	11
1990–91	Prem	36	22	9	5	62	27	53	2nd	R3	SF	Cup Winners' Cup	R2	Hans Gillhaus	14
1991–92	Prem	44	17	14	13	55	42	48	6th	R3	R3	UEFA Cup	R1	Eoin Jess	12
1992–93	Prem	44	27	10	7	87	36	64	2nd	Final	Final			Duncan Shearer	22
1993–94	Prem	44	17	21	6	58	36	55	2nd	SF	QF	Cup Winners' Cup	R2	Duncan Shearer	17
1994–95	Prem	36	10	11	15	43	46	41	9th	R4	SF	UEFA Cup	PR	Billy Dodds	16
1995–96	Prem	36	16	7	13	52	45	55	3rd	SF	Winners			Scott Booth Joe Miller	9
1996–97	Prem	36	10	14	12	45	54	44	6th	R3	QF	UEFA Cup	R2	Billy Dodds	17
1997–98	Prem	36	9	12	15	39	53	39	6th	R3	SF			Billy Dodds	10
1998–99	SPL (Note: The league was renamed to the Scottish Premier League.)	36	10	7	19	43	71	37	8th	R3	R3			Eoin Jess	14
1999–2000	SPL	36	9	6	21	44	83	33	10th	Final	Final			Arild Stavrum	9
2000–01	SPL	38	11	12	15	45	52	45	7th	R4	R3	UEFA Cup	QR	Arild Stavrum	17
2001–02	SPL	38	16	7	15	51	49	55	4th	QF	R3			Robbie Winters	13
2002–03	SPL	38	13	10	15	41	54	49	8th	R4	R3	UEFA Cup	R1	Paul Sheerin	8
2003–04	SPL	38	9	7	22	39	63	34	11th	QF	QF			Scott Booth	8
2004–05	SPL	38	18	7	13	44	39	61	4th	QF	R3			Darren Mackie	11
2005–06	SPL	38	13	15	10	46	40	54	6th	R4	QF			Steve Lovell Jamie Smith	8
2006–07	SPL	38	19	8	11	55	38	65	3rd	R3	R2			Darren Mackie	13
2007–08	SPL	38	15	8	15	50	58	53	4th	SF	SF	UEFA Cup	Last 32	Lee Miller	12
2008–09	SPL	38	14	11	13	41	40	53	4th	QF	R2			Lee Miller	10
2009–10	SPL	38	10	11	17	36	52	41	9th	R5	R3	Europa League	QR3	Steve MacLean	5
2010–11	SPL	38	11	5	22	39	59	38	9th	SF	SF			Scott Vernon	9
2011–12	SPL	38	9	14	15	36	44	41	9th	SF	R3			Scott Vernon	11
2012–13	SPL	38	11	15	12	41	43	48	8th	R5	R4			Niall McGinn	20
2013–14	Prem (Note: The league was renamed to the Scottish Premiership.)	38	20	8	10	53	38	68	3rd	SF	Winners			Niall McGinn	14
2014–15	Prem	38	23	6	9	57	33	75	2nd	R4	SF	Europa League	QR3	Adam Rooney	17
2015–16	Prem	38	22	5	11	62	48	71	2nd	R4	R3	Europa League	QR3	Adam Rooney	20
2016–17	Prem	38	24	4	10	74	35	76	2nd	Final	Final	Europa League	QR3	Adam Rooney	12
2017–18	Prem	38	22	7	9	56	37	73	2nd	SF	QF	Europa League	QR3	Adam Rooney	9
2018–19	Prem	38	20	7	11	57	44	67	4th	SF	Final	Europa League	QR2	Sam Cosgrove	17
2019–20	Prem (Note: The 2019–20 Scottish Premiership was suspended in March 2020 due to the COVID-19 pandemic in Scotland; the season was curtailed and standings at the time of postponement were declared final on 18 May 2020.)	30	12	9	9	40	36	45	4th	SF	QF	Europa League	QR3	Sam Cosgrove	11
2020–21	Prem	38	15	11	12	36	38	56	4th	QF	R2	Europa League	QR3	Lewis Ferguson	8
2021–22	Prem	38	10	11	17	41	46	41	10th	R5	R2	Europa Conference League	PO	Lewis Ferguson	11
2022–23	Prem	38	18	3	17	56	60	57	3rd	R4	SF			Duk Bojan Miovski	16
2023–24	Prem	38	12	12	14	48	52	48	7th	SF	Final	Europa League Europa Conference League	PO Group	Bojan Miovski	16
2024–25	Prem	38	15	8	15	48	61	53	5th	Winners	SF			Kevin Nisbet	11
2025–26	Prem	38	11	7	20	40	55	40	9th	QF	QF	Europa League Conference League	PO League	Kevin Nisbet	9

== Key ==
Key to league record

- Pld = Matches played
- W = Matches won
- D = Matches drawn
- L = Matches lost
- GF = Goals for
- GA = Goals against
- Pts = Points
- Pos = Final position

Key to rounds

- Group = Group stage
- League = League phase
- PO = Play-off round
- PR = Preliminary round
- PR2 = Second preliminary round
- QR = Qualifying round
- QR2 = Second qualifying round
- QR3 = Third qualifying round
- R1 = Round 1
- R2 = Round 2
- R3 = Round 3
- R4 = Round 4
- R5 = Round 5
- R6 = Round 6
- QF = Quarter-finals
- SF = Semi-finals
- Final = Runners-up

Winners	Runners-up	Third place / semi-finals

== See also ==
- Aberdeen F.C. in European football
- History of Aberdeen F.C.
- List of Aberdeen F.C. records and statistics
