= 1927–28 Aberdeen F.C. season =

Aberdeen F.C.
1927–28 season
- Chairman: William Philip
- Manager: Paddy Travers
- Scottish League Division One: 7th
- Scottish Cup: 1st Round
- Highest home attendance: 35,000 vs. Rangers, 4 September
- Lowest home attendance: 10,000 vs. Clyde 1 February

The 1927–28 season was Aberdeen's 23rd season in the top flight of Scottish football and their 24th season overall. Aberdeen competed in the Scottish League Division One and the Scottish Cup.

== Results ==
=== Division One ===
Match Day	Date	Opponent	H/A	Score	Aberdeen Scorer(s)	Attendance
1	13 August	Rangers	H	2–3	McDermid, Cosgrove	25,000
2	20 August	Raith Rovers	A	3–2	Yorston, Cheyne, McDermid	8,500
3	27 August	Kilmarnock	H	1–2	Bruce	12,000
4	3 September	Queen's Park	A	3–4	Yorston (2), Bruce	11,500
5	10 September	Hibernian	H	4–2	Cheyne (3), Love	10,000
6	17 September	Clyde	A	2–3	Yorston (2)	6,000
7	24 September	Falkirk	H	2–1	Yorston, Smith	10,000
8	26 September	St Johnstone	H	4–0	Yorston (2), Bruce, Cheyne	12,000
9	1 October	Hamilton Academical	A	3–2	Yorston (2), Love	3,000
10	8 October	Dunfermline Athletic	H	2–1	Bruce, Smith	12,000
11	15 October	Dundee	A	2–3	Bruce (2)	10,000
12	22 October	Celtic	H	3–1	Smith (2), Yorston	20,000
13	29 October	St Johnstone	A	0–1		8,000
14	5 November	Partick Thistle	A	0–7		11,000
15	12 November	Bo'ness	H	0–1		9,000
16	19 November	Heart of Midlothian	A	0–3		15,500
17	26 November	St Mirren	A	1–0	McDermid	6,000
18	3 December	Airdrieonians	H	0–0		9,000
19	10 December	Cowdenbeath	A	2–2	McDermid, Smith	3,000
20	17 December	Motherwell	H	2–0	Love, Smith	8,000
21	24 December	Rangers	A	0–5		11,000
22	31 December	Queen's Park	H	2–1	Cheyne, McHale	9,000
23	2 January	Dundee	H	3–1	Love (2 including 1 penalty), Bruce	15,000
24	3 January	Hibernian	A	0–0		12,000
25	7 January	Kilmarnock	A	1–2	Bruce	4,500
26	14 January	Clyde	H	6–0	Bruce (2), Smith, Love, Cheyne	9,000
27	28 January	Dunfermline Athletic	A	3–2	Smith, Bruce, McLeod	4,000
28	8 February	Hamilton Academical	H	2–0	Cosgrove (2)	5,500
29	11 February	Falkirk	A	1–5	Yorston	6,000
30	25 February	Celtic	A	1–1	Smith	8,000
31	3 March	Raith Rovers	H	3–0	Cheyne (2), Yorston	11,000
32	10 March	Celtic	H	3–0	McHale, Yorston, Merrie	9,000
33	17 March	Bo'ness	A	0–0		3,000
34	24 March	Heart of Midlothian	H	2–0	Love (2)	9,500
35	31 March	St Mirren	H	3–2	Love, Yorston, Merrie	10,000
36	7 April	Airdrieonians	A	1–2	Love	2,500
37	14 April	Cowdenbeath	H	3–0	Smith (2), Yorston	8,000
38	16 April	Motherwell	A	1–2	Yorston	4,000

==== Final standings ====
Pos	Team	Pld	W	D	L	GF	GA	GD	Pts
5	St Mirren	38	18	8	12	77	76	+1	44
6	Partick Thistle	38	18	7	13	85	67	+18	43
7	Aberdeen	38	19	5	14	71	61	+10	43
8	Kilmarnock	38	15	10	13	68	78	−10	40
9	Cowdenbeath	38	16	7	15	66	68	−2	39

Source: "1927-1928 Division 1 - SPFL Archive". SPFL.

=== Scottish Cup ===
Round	Date	Opponent	H/A	Score	Aberdeen Scorer(s)	Attendance
R1	21 January	Raith Rovers	A	3–4	Bruce (3)	8,000

== Squad ==
=== Appearances & Goals ===
No.	Pos	Nat	Player	Total		Division One		Scottish Cup	
No.	Pos	Nat	Player	Apps	Goals	Apps	Goals	Apps	Goals
	GK	(England) ENG	Harry Blackwell	27	0	26	0	1	0
	GK	(Scotland) SCO	Peter McSevich	12	0	12	0	0	0
	DF	(Scotland) SCO	Willie Jackson	39	0	38	0	1	0
	DF	(Scotland) SCO	Jimmy Black	30	1	29	1	1	0
	DF	(Scotland) SCO	Doug Livingstone	20	0	19	0	1	0
	DF	(Scotland) SCO	Duff Bruce	9	0	9	0	0	0
	DF	(Scotland) SCO	Malcolm Muir	5	0	5	0	0	0
	DF	(Scotland) SCO	Dod Ritchie	3	0	3	0	0	0
	DF	(Scotland) SCO	Willie Cooper	2	0	2	0	0	0
	DF	(Scotland) SCO	Hugh McLaren	0	0	0	0	0	0
	MF	(Scotland) SCO	Jimmy Smith	36	11	35	11	1	0
	MF	(Scotland) SCO	Jock McHale	23	2	22	2	1	0
	MF	(Scotland) SCO	Hector Lawson	18	0	18	0	0	0
	MF	(Scotland) SCO	Willie Ross	9	0	8	0	1	0
	MF	(Scotland) SCO	Jock Edward	8	0	8	0	0	0
	MF	(Northern Ireland) NIR	Eddie Falloon	2	0	2	0	0	0
	MF	(England) ENG	Sam Spencer	1	0	1	0	0	0
	FW	(Scotland) SCO	Bob McDermid (c)	35	4	34	4	1	0
	FW	(Scotland) SCO	Alec Cheyne	32	9	31	9	1	0
	FW	(Scotland) SCO	Andy Love	31	10	30	10	1	0
	FW	(Scotland) SCO	Benny Yorston	28	17	28	17	0	0
	FW	(Scotland) SCO	Bobby Bruce	26	14	25	11	1	3
	FW	(Scotland) SCO	Mike Cosgrove	10	3	10	3	0	0
	FW	(Scotland) SCO	Alex Merrie	7	2	7	2	0	0
	FW	(Scotland) SCO	Tom McLeod	6	1	6	1	0	0
	FW	(Scotland) SCO	John MacFarlane	5	0	5	0	0	0
	FW	(Scotland) SCO	John Wilson	5	0	5	0	0	0
