= 1926–27 Aberdeen F.C. season =

Aberdeen F.C.
1926–27 season
- Chairman: William Philip
- Manager: Paddy Travers
- Scottish League Division One: 8th
- Scottish Cup: 2nd Round
- Highest home attendance: 35,000 vs. Rangers, 4 September
- Lowest home attendance: 10,000 vs. Clyde 1 February

The 1926–27 season was Aberdeen's 22nd season in the top flight of Scottish football and their 23rd season overall. Aberdeen competed in the Scottish League Division One and the Scottish Cup.

== Results ==
=== Division One ===
Match Day	Date	Opponent	H/A	Score	Aberdeen Scorer(s)	Attendance
1	14 August	Cowdenbeath	H	0–0		5,000
2	21 August	Clyde	H	5–2	Miller (2), Bruce (2), MacLachlan	16,000
3	28 August	Hibernian	A	3–2	Bruce (2), Hutton	16,000
4	4 September	Queen's Park	H	2–0	Miller, Hutton	14,000
5	11 September	Falkirk	A	1–1	Smith	8,000
6	18 September	Morton	H	6–1	Hutton (2 penalties), Cheyne, Reid, Miller, Edward	10,000
7	25 September	Rangers	A	2–3	Miller, McDermid	23,000
8	27 September	Kilmarnock	H	5–1	Bruce (3), Smith (2)	14,000
9	2 October	Hamilton Academical	H	3–3	Smith, MacLachlan, Hutton	15,000
10	9 October	Kilmarnock	A	0–0		4,000
11	16 October	St Johnstone	H	3–1	Bruce, McDermid, Reid	14,000
12	23 October	Celtic	A	2–6	MacLachlan, Reid	12,000
13	30 October	Dundee	H	2–1	Brown, McDermid	18,000
14	6 November	Partick Thistle	H	1–4	McDermid	16,000
15	13 November	Dundee United	A	2–2	McDermid, Bruce	7,000
16	20 November	Heart of Midlothian	H	6–5	MacLachlan (2), Love, Miller, Reid, Bruce	14,000
17	27 November	St Mirren	H	1–0	McDermid	15,000
18	4 December	Airdrieonians	A	1–2	Bruce	6,000
19	11 December	Dunfermline Athletic	H	3–1	McDermid, Miller, Reid	14,000
20	18 December	Motherwell	A	0–1		7,500
21	25 December	Cowdenbeath	H	0–0		10,000
22	1 January	Dundee	A	1–1	Reid	16,500
23	3 January	Hibernian	H	2–5	Miller, Reid	12,000
24	8 January	Queen's Park	A	1–1	Bruce	6,500
25	15 January	Falkirk	H	3–0	Cheyne (2), Love	14,000
26	29 January	Morton	A	4–3	Reid (2), Bruce (2)	1,000
27	12 February	Hamilton Academical	A	0–2		6,000
28	16 February	Rangers	H	2–2	Cheyne, Bruce	16,000
29	26 February	St Johnstone	A	1–1	Bruce	6,000
30	9 March	Celtic	H	0–0		11,000
31	12 March	Clyde	A	1–5	Reid	7,500
32	19 March	Partick Thistle	A	0–4		12,000
33	26 March	Dundee United	H	2–2	Reid (penalty), Cheyne	9,500
34	2 April	Heart of Midlothian	A	2–2	Bruce, Cheyne	13,000
35	9 April	St Mirren	A	3–6	Bruce, Cheyne, Smith	6,000
36	16 April	Airdrieonians	H	1–1	McDermid	10,000
37	23 April	Dunfermline Athletic	A	0–1		4,000
38	30 April	Motherwell	H	2–0	Bruce (2)	8,000

==== Final standings ====
Pos	Team	Pld	W	D	L	GF	GA	GD	Pts
6	Falkirk	38	15	12	11	77	60	+17	42
7	Cowdenbeath	38	18	6	14	74	60	+14	42
8	Aberdeen	38	13	14	11	73	72	+1	40
9	Hibernian	38	16	7	15	62	71	−9	39
10	St Mirren	38	16	5	17	78	76	+2	37

Source: "1926-1927 Division 1 - SPFL Archive". SPFL.

=== Scottish Cup ===
Round	Date	Opponent	H/A	Score	Aberdeen Scorer(s)	Attendance
R1	22 January	Helensburgh	H	4–2	Bruce (3), Cheyne	14,000
R2	5 February	East Fife	A	1–1	Lawson	8,000
R2 R	9 February	East Fife	H	1–2	Bruce	12,000

== Squad ==
=== Appearances & Goals ===
No.	Pos	Nat	Player	Total		Division One		Scottish Cup	
No.	Pos	Nat	Player	Apps	Goals	Apps	Goals	Apps	Goals
	GK	(Scotland) SCO	Peter McSevich	22	0	20	0	2	0
	GK	(England) ENG	Harry Blackwell	19	0	18	0	1	0
	DF	(Scotland) SCO	Duff Bruce	33	0	32	0	1	0
	DF	(Scotland) SCO	Willie Jackson	24	0	21	0	3	0
	DF	(Scotland) SCO	Jock Hutton	10	5	10	5	0	0
	DF	(Scotland) SCO	Dod Ritchie	10	0	8	0	2	0
	DF	(Scotland) SCO	Malcolm Muir	5	0	5	0	0	0
	MF	(Scotland) SCO	Jock Edward	40	1	37	1	3	0
	MF	(Scotland) SCO	Bert MachLachlan (c)	27	5	24	5	3	0
	MF	(Scotland) SCO	Jimmy Smith	26	5	26	5	0	0
	MF	(Scotland) SCO	Jock McHale	13	0	13	0	0	0
	MF	(England) ENG	Sam Spencer	10	0	7	0	3	0
	MF	(Scotland) SCO	Willie Ross	10	0	10	0	0	0
	MF	(Scotland) SCO	Hector Lawson	7	1	6	0	1	1
	MF	??	James John	0	0	0	0	0	0
	FW	(Scotland) SCO	Alec Reid	41	11	38	11	3	0
	FW	(Scotland) SCO	Bob McDermid	40	8	38	8	2	0
	FW	(Scotland) SCO	Bobby Bruce	39	24	36	20	3	4
	FW	(Scotland) SCO	Alec Cheyne	25	8	23	7	2	1
	FW	(Scotland) SCO	John Miller	19	8	18	8	1	0
	FW	(Scotland) SCO	Mike Cosgrove	18	0	18	0	0	0
	FW	(Scotland) SCO	Andy Love	11	2	8	2	3	0
	FW	(Scotland) SCO	Tom McLeod	1	0	1	0	0	0
	FW	(Scotland) SCO	John MacFarlane	1	0	1	0	0	0
	FW	(Scotland) SCO	Benny Yorston	0	0	0	0	0	0
	FW	(Scotland) SCO	James Robertson	0	0	0	0	0	0
