= 1929–30 Aberdeen F.C. season =

Aberdeen F.C.
1929–30 season
- Chairman: William Philip
- Manager: Paddy Travers
- Scottish League Division One: 3rd
- Scottish Cup: 3rd Round
- Top goalscorer: League: Benny Yorston (39); All: Benny Yorston (47)
- Highest home attendance: 32,000 vs. Rangers, 7 September
- Lowest home attendance: 7,000 vs. Nithsdale Wanderers 1 February

The 1929–30 season was Aberdeen's 25th season in the top flight of Scottish football and their 26th season overall. Aberdeen competed in the Scottish League Division One and the Scottish Cup.

== Results ==
=== Division One ===
Match Day	Date	Opponent	H/A	Score	Aberdeen Scorer(s)	Attendance
1	10 August	Falkirk	A	2–3	Yorston (2)	9,000
2	17 August	Motherwell	H	2–2	McDermid (2)	15,000
3	24 August	Celtic	A	4–3	Smith, Love, Cheyne, Yorston	20,000
4	31 August	Airdrieonians	A	2–0	Love (2)	5,000
5	7 September	Rangers	H	1–1	Cheyne	32,000
6	14 September	Clyde	A	3–1	Cheyne, Yorston, Love (penalty)	6,000
7	21 September	Morton	H	5–3	Love (2), Yorston, Cheyne, Smith	14,000
8	23 September	Clyde	H	5–2	Yorston (3), Love, Cheyne	14,000
9	28 September	Partick Thistle	H	2–1	Love (penalty), Yorston	14,000
10	5 October	St Johnstone	A	1–0	Cheyne	7,000
11	12 October	Ayr United	H	4–1	Yorston (2), Cheyne, Love	14,000
12	19 October	Heart of Midlothian	A	2–2	Yorston, McDermid	35,000
13	26 October	Dundee	H	1–0	Yorston	20,000
14	2 November	Kilmarnock	A	2–4	Yorston (2)	9,000
15	9 November	Cowdenbeath	H	2–0	Smith, Yorston	14,000
16	16 November	St Mirren	A	0–1		10,000
17	23 November	Dundee United	A	4–2	Love (2), Yorston, Cheyne	12,000
18	30 November	Hamilton Academical	H	4–3	Yorston (3), Love (penalty)	13,000
19	7 December	Hibernian	H	2–0	Cheyne, Love	10,000
20	14 December	Queen's Park	A	2–2	Love, Cheyne	20,000
21	21 December	Falkirk	H	1–0	Yorston	10,000
22	28 December	Motherwell	A	1–4	Cheyne	8,000
23	1 January	Dundee	A	3–0	Yorston (3)	20,000
24	2 January	Heart of Midlothian	H	2–2	Hill, Dickie	18,000
25	4 January	Celtic	H	3–1	Yorston (2), Love	22,000
26	11 January	Airdrieonians	H	3–1	Cheyne, Love, Yorston	10,000
27	25 January	Rangers	A	1–3	McLaren (penalty)	40,000
28	8 February	Morton	A	2–1	Yorston (2)	3,500
29	19 February	Partick Thistle	A	1–2	Cheyne	4,000
30	22 February	St Johnstone	H	1–0	Black	10,000
31	1 March	Ayr United	A	1–5	Smith	5,000
32	8 March	Kilmarnock	H	4–3	Cheyne (2), Yorston (2)	11,000
33	15 March	Cowdenbeath	A	1–0	McDermid	1,000
34	22 March	St Mirren	H	3–3	Yorston (2), Hickie	14,500
35	29 March	Dundee United	H	2–2	Yorston, Smith	12,000
36	5 April	Hamilton Academical	A	2–4	Yorston, McLaren	4,000
37	12 April	Hibernian	A	1–0	Yorston	4,000
38	19 April	Queen's Park	H	3–0	Yorston (2), Love	12,000

==== Final standings ====
Pos	Team	Pld	W	D	L	GF	GA	GD	Pts
1	Rangers	38	28	4	6	94	32	+62	60
2	Motherwell	38	25	5	8	104	48	+56	55
3	Aberdeen	38	23	7	8	85	61	+24	53
4	Celtic	38	22	5	11	88	46	+42	49
5	St Mirren	38	18	5	15	73	56	+17	41

Source: "1929-1930 Division 1 - SPFL Archive". SPFL.

=== Scottish Cup ===
Round	Date	Opponent	H/A	Score	Aberdeen Scorer(s)	Attendance
R1	18 January	Raith Rovers	A	3–3	Yorston, Love, Cheyne	10,000
R1 R	31 January	Raith Rovers	H	7–0	Yorston (3), Cheyne, McLaren, McDermid, Smith	13,191
R2	1 February	Nithsdale Wanderers	H	5–1	Cheyne (2), Yorston (2), McDermid	7,000
R3	15 February	Partick Thistle	A	2–3	Yorston (2)	38,568

== Squad ==
=== Appearances & Goals ===
No.	Pos	Nat	Player	Total		Division One		Scottish Cup	
No.	Pos	Nat	Player	Apps	Goals	Apps	Goals	Apps	Goals
	GK	(Scotland) SCO	Duncan Yuill	40	0	36	0	4	0
	GK	(England) ENG	Harry Blackwell	2	0	2	0	0	0
	DF	(Scotland) SCO	Jimmy Black	41	1	37	1	4	0
	DF	(Scotland) SCO	Hugh McLaren	37	3	33	2	4	1
	DF	(Scotland) SCO	Ned Legge	25	0	21	0	4	0
	DF	(Scotland) SCO	Doug Livingstone	23	0	23	0	0	0
	DF	(Scotland) SCO	Jimmy Hickie	14	1	14	1	0	0
	DF	(Scotland) SCO	Willie Cooper	14	0	14	0	0	0
	DF	(Scotland) SCO	Willie Jackson	9	0	5	0	4	0
	DF	(Scotland) SCO	Malcolm Muir	0	0	0	0	0	0
	MF	(Scotland) SCO	Jimmy Smith	40	6	36	5	4	1
	MF	(Scotland) SCO	Frank Hill	40	1	37	1	3	0
	MF	(Northern Ireland) NIR	Eddie Falloon	7	0	6	0	1	0
	MF	(Scotland) SCO	Jock McHale	6	0	6	0	0	0
	MF	(Scotland) SCO	Daniel McKenzie	1	0	1	0	0	0
	FW	(Scotland) SCO	Benny Yorston	42	45	38	38	4	7
	FW	(Scotland) SCO	Bob McDermid (c)	39	7	35	4	4	3
	FW	(Scotland) SCO	Alec Cheyne	38	19	34	15	4	4
	FW	(Scotland) SCO	Andy Love	36	18	33	17	3	1
	FW	(Scotland) SCO	Percy Dickie	5	1	4	1	1	0
	FW	(Scotland) SCO	Tom McLeod	2	0	2	0	0	0
	FW	(Scotland) SCO	Alex Merrie	1	0	1	0	0	0
	FW	(Scotland) SCO	Norman David	0	0	0	0	0	0
	FW	(Scotland) SCO	Dick Donald	0	0	0	0	0	0
	FW	(Scotland) SCO	John Wilson	0	0	0	0	0	0
