= 1930–31 Aberdeen F.C. season =

Aberdeen F.C.
1930–31 season
- Chairman: John Robertson
- Manager: Paddy Travers
- Scottish League Division One: 6th
- Scottish Cup: 4th Round
- Top goalscorer: League: Benny Yorston (16); All: Benny Yorston (22)
- Highest home attendance: 28,527 vs. Dundee, 18 February
- Lowest home attendance: 8,000 vs. Rangers 7 March

The 1930–31 season was Aberdeen's 26th season in the top flight of Scottish football and their 27th season overall. Aberdeen competed in the Scottish League Division One and the Scottish Cup.

== Results ==
=== Division One ===
Match Day	Date	Opponent	H/A	Score	Aberdeen Scorer(s)	Attendance
1	9 August	Partick Thistle	A	1–2	Dickie	23,000
2	16 August	Leith Athletic	H	2–1	Love (2)	15,000
3	23 August	Cowdenbeath	A	0–2		5,000
4	30 August	Airdrieonians	H	2–0	McDermid, Merrie	12,500
5	6 September	Celtic	A	0–1		12,000
6	13 September	Motherwell	H	2–4	McDermid, Yorston	11,000
7	20 September	Dundee	A	2–4	Yorston, McDermid	13,000
8	22 September	Hamilton Academical	H	0–2		12,000
9	27 September	Heart of Midlothian	H	2–1	Smith, Hill	13,000
10	4 October	Ayr United	A	1–2	Yorston	5,000
11	11 October	St Mirren	H	0–0		12,000
12	18 October	East Fife	A	3–1	McLaren, Smith, McDermid	6,000
13	25 October	Queen's Park	H	3–1	Yorston (2), McDermid	12,000
14	1 November	Rangers	A	0–4		20,000
15	8 November	Kilmarnock	H	2–0	Yorston, Black	13,000
16	15 November	Hibernian	H	7–0	Merrie (6), McDermid	12,000
17	22 November	Falkirk	A	3–5	Merrie, McLaren, Love	1,500
18	29 November	Morton	H	4–0	Merrie (2), McLean, Yorston	12,000
19	6 December	Clyde	A	5–2	Yorston (3), Merrie, McLean	4,000
20	13 December	Hamilton Academical	A	0–3		4,000
21	20 December	Partick Thistle	H	3–1	Merrie, McDermid, McLean	16,000
22	27 December	Leith Athletic	A	0–0		4,000
23	1 January	Dundee	H	6–1	Yorston (3), McDermid (2), Love (penalty)	22,000
24	3 January	Cowdenbeath	H	1–1	Yorston	15,000
25	5 January	Heart of Midlothian	A	2–3	Love, McLean	10,000
26	10 January	Airdrieonians	A	0–2		4,000
27	24 January	Celtic	H	1–1	McDermid	20,000
28	7 February	Ayr United	H	3–1	McLean (2), McMillan	12,000
29	9 February	Motherwell	A	0–5		3,000
30	21 February	East Fife	H	4–1	McLean (2), Merrie, McDermid	10,000
31	23 February	St Mirren	A	2–2	Hill, McLean	3,000
32	3 March	Queen's Park	A	2–2	David, Dickie	4,000
33	7 March	Rangers	H	1–3	David	8,000
34	18 March	Kilmarnock	A	1–1	David	6,000
35	21 March	Hibernian	A	2–1	David (2)	5,000
36	4 April	Falkirk	H	2–1	McLean, Hill	10,000
37	11 April	Morton	A	2–1	McDermid (2)	3,000
38	18 April	Clyde	H	8–1	Love (3 including 1 penalty), Yorston (2), McLean (2) McDermid	9,000

==== Final standings ====
Pos	Team	Pld	W	D	L	GF	GA	GD	Pts
4	Partick Thistle	38	24	5	9	76	43	+33	53
5	Heart of Midlothian	38	19	6	13	90	63	+27	44
6	Aberdeen	38	17	7	14	79	63	+16	41
7	Cowdenbeath	38	17	7	14	58	65	−7	41
8	Dundee	38	17	5	16	65	63	+2	39

Source: "1930-1931 Division 1 - SPFL Archive". SPFL.

=== Scottish Cup ===
Round	Date	Opponent	H/A	Score	Aberdeen Scorer(s)	Attendance
R1	17 January	Dumbarton	H	6–1	Yorston (2), Love (2), McLean, McDermid	10,570
R2	31 January	Partick Thistle	H	1–1	Yorston	15,053
R2 R	4 February	Partick Thistle	A	3–0	Yorston (2), McMillan	29,000
R3	14 February	Dundee	A	1–1	Hill	38,099
R3 R	18 February	Dundee	H	2–0	Yorston (2), McLean	28,527
R4	28 February	Celtic	A	0–4		64,699

== Squad ==
=== Appearances & Goals ===
No.	Pos	Nat	Player	Total		Division One		Scottish Cup	
No.	Pos	Nat	Player	Apps	Goals	Apps	Goals	Apps	Goals
	GK	(Scotland) SCO	Steve Smith	37	0	31	0	6	0
	GK	(Scotland) SCO	Dave Cumming	7	0	7	0	0	0
	DF	(Scotland) SCO	Hugh McLaren	42	3	36	3	6	0
	DF	(Scotland) SCO	Jimmy Black	41	1	35	1	6	0
	DF	(Scotland) SCO	Willie Jackson	35	0	29	0	6	0
	DF	(Scotland) SCO	Willie Cooper	22	0	20	0	2	0
	DF	(Scotland) SCO	Ned Legge	20	0	20	0	0	0
	DF	??	John Shannon	0	0	0	0	0	0
	DF	(Scotland) SCO	David Robertson	0	0	0	0	0	0
	MF	(Scotland) SCO	Frank Hill	35	4	30	3	5	1
	MF	(Scotland) SCO	Jimmy Smith	25	2	22	2	3	0
	MF	(Northern Ireland) NIR	Eddie Falloon	17	0	13	0	4	0
	MF	(Scotland) SCO	Daniel McKenzie	1	0	1	0	0	0
	MF	??	Tom Dryden	1	0	1	0	0	0
	MF	(Scotland) SCO	Dave Warnock	0	0	0	0	0	0
	MF	(Scotland) SCO	Michael Burke	0	0	0	0	0	0
	FW	(Scotland) SCO	Andy Love	43	10	37	8	6	2
	FW	(Scotland) SCO	Bob McDermid (c)	42	13	36	12	6	1
	FW	(Scotland) SCO	Benny Yorston	33	22	28	16	5	6
	FW	(Scotland) SCO	Adam McLean	30	13	24	11	6	2
	FW	(Scotland) SCO	Percy Dickie	21	2	19	2	2	0
	FW	(Scotland) SCO	Alex Merrie	10	13	10	13	0	0
	FW	(Scotland) SCO	Norman David	8	5	8	5	0	0
	FW	(Scotland) SCO	Dick Donald	6	0	5	0	1	0
	FW	(Scotland) SCO	Tom McLeod	4	0	4	0	0	0
	FW	(Scotland) SCO	Lachlan McMillan	3	2	1	1	2	1
	FW	(Scotland) SCO	Willie Paterson	1	0	1	0	0	0
	FW	(Scotland) SCO	David Galloway	0	0	0	0	0	0
	FW	??	James Stewart	0	0	0	0	0	0
