= 1925–26 Aberdeen F.C. season =

Aberdeen F.C.
1925–26 season
- Chairman: William Philip
- Manager: Paddy Travers
- Scottish League Division One: 11th
- Scottish Cup: Semi-finalists
- Highest home attendance: 35,000 vs. Rangers, 4 September
- Lowest home attendance: 10,000 vs. Clyde 1 February

The 1925–26 season was Aberdeen's 21st season in the top flight of Scottish football and their 22nd season overall. Aberdeen competed in the Scottish League Division One and the Scottish Cup.

== Results ==
=== Division One ===
Match Day	Date	Opponent	H/A	Score	Aberdeen Scorer(s)	Attendance
1	15 August	Hamilton Academical	H	3–3	Wattie Jackson (2), Reid	19,000
2	22 August	Airdrieonians	A	1–4	Reid	7,000
3	29 August	Cowdenbeath	H	2–1	Reid, McDermid	16,000
4	5 September	Queen's Park	A	1–0	Wattie Jackson	12,000
5	12 September	Rangers	H	3–1	Willie Jackson, Wattie Jackson, Reid	26,000
6	19 September	Clydebank	A	0–0		5,000
7	21 September	Heart of Midlothian	A	0–1		25,000
8	26 September	Morton	H	1–2	Hutton (penalty)	10,000
9	28 September	St Mirren	H	1–2	Pirie	12,000
10	3 October	Falkirk	A	1–2	Smith	8,000
11	10 October	Hibernian	H	5–0	Reid (2), McDermid, Smith, Willie Jackson	12,000
12	17 October	Dundee	A	2–3	Wattie Jackson, Smith	14,000
13	24 October	Motherwell	A	1–1	Willie Jackson	9,000
14	31 October	Kilmarnock	H	3–2	Smith (2), McLeod	12,000
15	7 November	Celtic	H	2–4	Willie Jackson, McLeod	21,000
16	14 November	Dundee United	A	0–2		12,000
17	21 November	St Johnstone	H	0–1		12,000
18	28 November	Raith Rovers	A	1–0	Bruce	4,500
19	5 December	Heart of Midlothian	H	0–2		12,000
20	12 December	Partick Thistle	A	2–2	Reid, McDermid	8,000
21	19 December	Clydebank	H	4–1	McDermid (2), Smith, McLachlan	8,000
22	30 December	Morton	A	0–2		1,500
23	1 January	Dundee	H	2–1	Bruce (2)	18,000
24	2 January	Hibernian	A	0–0		17,000
25	4 January	Queen's Park	H	3–1	McDermid, Willie Jackson, Smith	10,000
26	9 January	Cowdenbeath	A	1–2	McDermid	5,000
27	16 January	Falkirk	H	0–0		11,000
28	30 January	Hamilton Academcial	A	1–1	Reid	5,000
29	13 February	St Johnstone	A	1–1	Reid	8,000
30	17 February	Partick Thistle	H	0–0		10,000
31	27 February	Airdrieonians	H	3–1	Willie Jackson, Doolan, Smith	10,000
32	13 March	Motherwell	H	1–0	Reid	12,000
33	17 March	Kilmarnock	A	0–3		4,000
34	27 March	Rangers	A	1–0	Reid	10,000
35	30 March	Celtic	A	1–4	McDermid	5,000
36	3 April	Dundee United	H	1–0	Hutton	10,500
37	17 April	Raith Rovers	A	1–1	Carroll	9,000
38	24 April	St Mirren	A	0–3		10,000

==== Final standings ====
Pos	Team	Pld	W	D	L	GF	GA	GD	Pts
9	Kilmarnock	38	17	7	14	79	77	+2	41
10	Dundee	38	14	9	15	47	59	−12	37
11	Aberdeen	38	13	10	15	49	54	−5	36
12	Hamilton Academical	38	13	9	16	68	79	−11	35
13	Queen's Park	38	15	4	19	70	81	−11	34

Source: "1925-1926 Division 1 - SPFL Archive". SPFL.

=== Scottish Cup ===
Round	Date	Opponent	H/A	Score	Aberdeen Scorer(s)	Attendance
R1	23 January	St Bernard's	H	8–1	Pirie (3), Willie Jackson, Hutton, Birrell, McDermid, Reid	8,076
R2	6 February	Dundee	H	0–0		12,621
R2 R	10 February	Dundee	A	3–0	Pirie (2), Bruce	10,000
R3	22 February	St Johnstone	H	2–2	Pirie, Hutton	21,026
R3 R	24 February	St Johnstone	A	0–0		12.500
R3 2R	1 March	St Johnstone	H	1–0	Bruce	13,750
R4	6 March	Third Lanark	A	1–1	Smith	16,400
R4 R	10 March	Third Lanark	H	3–0	Doolan, own goal, Smith	11,591
SF	20 March	Celtic	A	1–2	Hutton (penalty)	23,000

== Squad ==
=== Appearances & Goals ===
No.	Pos	Nat	Player	Total		Division One		Scottish Cup	
No.	Pos	Nat	Player	Apps	Goals	Apps	Goals	Apps	Goals
	GK	(England) ENG	Harry Blackwell	45	0	36	0	9	0
	GK	(Scotland) SCO	Peter McSevich	2	0	0	0	2	0
	DF	(Scotland) SCO	Jock Hutton	44	5	35	2	9	3
	DF	(Scotland) SCO	Duff Bruce	42	0	34	0	8	0
	DF	(Scotland) SCO	Willie Jackson	40	7	35	6	5	1
	DF	(Scotland) SCO	Dod Ritchie	7	0	6	0	1	0
	DF	(Scotland) SCO	Matt Forsyth	2	0	2	0	0	0
	DF	(Scotland) SCO	Malcolm Muir	1	0	1	0	0	0
	MF	(Scotland) SCO	Jimmy Smith	46	11	37	9	9	2
	MF	(Scotland) SCO	Bert MachLachlan (c)	38	1	30	1	8	0
	MF	(Scotland) SCO	Tom Pirie	34	7	25	1	9	6
	MF	(Scotland) SCO	Jock Edward	26	0	17	0	9	0
	MF	??	John Moore	5	0	5	0	0	0
	MF	(Scotland) SCO	Jock McHale	3	0	3	0	0	0
	MF	(England) ENG	Sam Spencer	1	0	1	0	0	0
	MF	(Scotland) SCO	Stewart Davidson	0	0	0	0	0	0
	MF	(Scotland) SCO	Arthur Robertson	0	0	0	0	0	0
	MF	(Scotland) SCO	James Gordon	0	0	0	0	0	0
	FW	(Scotland) SCO	Bob McDermid	43	9	34	8	9	1
	FW	(Scotland) SCO	Mike Cosgrove	40	0	33	0	7	0
	FW	(Scotland) SCO	Alec Reid	39	11	30	10	9	1
	FW	(Scotland) SCO	Bobby Bruce	23	5	17	3	6	2
	FW	(Scotland) SCO	Wattie Jackson	11	5	11	5	0	0
	FW	(Scotland) SCO	Tom McLeod	8	2	8	2	0	0
	FW	(Northern Ireland) NIR	Edward Carroll	5	1	5	1	0	0
	FW	(Scotland) SCO	Pat Doolan	4	2	3	1	1	1
	FW	(Scotland) SCO	Alec Cheyne	3	0	3	0	0	0
	FW	(Scotland) SCO	Andy Love	3	0	3	0	0	0
	FW	(Scotland) SCO	Charles Forbes	2	0	2	0	0	0
