= 1931–32 Aberdeen F.C. season =

Aberdeen F.C.
1931–32 season
- Chairman: John Robertson
- Manager: Paddy Travers
- Scottish League Division One: 6th
- Scottish Cup: 2nd Round
- Top goalscorer: League: Andy Love (12); All: Andy Love (12)
- Highest home attendance: 28,000 vs. Celtic, 22 August
- Lowest home attendance: 6,000 vs. Leith Athletic 2 September vs. Third Lanark 6 February
Home colours

The 1931–32 season was Aberdeen's 27th season in the top flight of Scottish football and their 28th season overall. Aberdeen competed in the Scottish League Division One and the Scottish Cup.

== Results ==
=== Division One ===
Match Day	Date	Opponent	H/A	Score	Aberdeen Scorer(s)	Attendance
1	8 August	Cowdenbeath	H	2–0	Yorston, Love	15,000
2	15 August	Airdrieonians	A	4–2	Hill (2), Falloon, Yorston	6,000
3	22 August	Celtic	H	1–1	Love	28,000
4	26 August	Clyde	H	1–0	Black	12,000
5	29 August	Motherwell	A	0–3		7,000
6	2 September	Leith Athletic	H	1–0	Love	6,000
7	5 September	Dundee	H	1–1	Love	17,000
8	12 September	Heart of Midlothian	A	0–0		17,000
9	15 September	Rangers	A	1–4	Yorston	10,000
10	19 September	Ayr United	H	5–1	Warnock (2), Yorston (penalty), Love, Beattie	10,500
11	26 September	Third Lanark	A	0–2		10,000
12	28 September	Falkirk	H	3–1	Jackson, Hill, McDermid	10,000
13	3 October	Partick Thistle	H	2–0	Hill, Love	14,000
14	10 October	St Mirren	A	2–4	Love, McLean	8,000
15	17 October	Dundee United	H	5–2	Yorston (2), McLean (2), Love	10,000
16	24 October	Queen's Park	A	3–1	Galloway, McDermid, Yorston	12,000
17	31 October	Morton	H	1–0	Love	10,000
18	7 November	Hamilton Academical	A	1–4	McLean	3,000
19	14 November	Kilmarnock	H	1–1	Yorston	9,000
20	21 November	Falkirk	A	0–3		5,000
21	28 November	Clyde	A	1–0	Adam	4,000
22	5 December	Leith Athletic	A	2–1	Love, Armstrong	1,000
23	12 December	Rangers	H	0–0		23,000
24	19 December	Cowdenbeath	A	1–3	Armstrong	2,000
25	26 December	Airdrieonians	H	2–2	McLean, Love	11,000
26	1 January	Dundee	A	0–0		14,000
27	2 January	Heart of Midlothian	H	1–2	McDermid	12,000
28	9 January	Celtic	A	0–2		7,000
29	23 January	Motherwell	H	0–1		16,000
30	30 January	Ayr United	A	2–3	Falloon (penalty), David	6,500
31	6 February	Third Lanark	H	1–0	David	6,000
32	13 February	Partick Thistle	A	0–1		11,000
33	20 February	St Mirren	H	0–2		10,500
34	27 February	Dundee United	A	4–0	Donald (3), Love	5,500
35	5 March	Queen's Park	H	1–1	Falloon	10,000
36	12 March	Morton	A	1–1	McLean	2,000
37	19 March	Hamilton Academical	H	5–0	Donald (2), McDermid, McLean, Beattie	8,000
38	6 April	Kilmarnock	A	2–0	McLean, Donald	2,000

==== Final standings ====
Pos	Team	Pld	W	D	L	GF	GA	GD	Pts
5	St Mirren	38	20	4	14	77	56	+21	44
6	Partick Thistle	38	19	4	15	58	59	−1	42
7	Aberdeen	38	16	9	13	57	49	+8	41
8	Heart of Midlothian	38	17	5	16	63	61	+2	39
9	Kilmarnock	38	16	7	15	68	70	−2	39

=== Scottish Cup ===
Round	Date	Opponent	H/A	Score	Aberdeen Scorer(s)	Attendance
R1	16 January	Arbroath	A	1–2	Armstrong	5,000

== Squad ==
=== Appearances & Goals ===
No.	Pos	Nat	Player	Total		Division One		Scottish Cup	
No.	Pos	Nat	Player	Apps	Goals	Apps	Goals	Apps	Goals
	GK	(Scotland) SCO	Steve Smith	38	0	37	0	1	0
	GK	(Scotland) SCO	Dave Cumming	1	0	1	0	0	0
	DF	(Scotland) SCO	Willie Cooper	38	0	37	0	1	0
	DF	(Scotland) SCO	Charlie McGill	24	0	23	0	1	0
	DF	(Scotland) SCO	Bob Fraser	22	0	21	0	1	0
	DF	(Scotland) SCO	Hugh McLaren	19	0	19	0	0	0
	DF	(Scotland) SCO	Jimmy Black	16	1	16	1	0	0
	DF	(Scotland) SCO	Willie Jackson	13	1	13	1	0	0
	DF	(Scotland) SCO	Ned Legge	4	0	4	0	0	0
	DF	(Scotland) SCO	Claud Sharp	3	0	3	0	0	0
	DF	??	?? Tosh	0	0	0	0	0	0
	MF	(Northern Ireland) NIR	Eddie Falloon	22	3	21	3	1	0
	MF	(Scotland) SCO	Frank Hill	17	4	17	4	0	0
	MF	(Scotland) SCO	Dave Warnock	15	2	14	2	1	0
	MF	(Scotland) SCO	Robert Ballantyne	11	0	11	0	0	0
	MF	(Scotland) SCO	Hugh Adam	7	1	7	1	0	0
	MF	(Northern Ireland) NIR	Hugh Mooney	6	0	6	0	0	0
	MF	??	?? Cheyne	0	0	0	0	0	0
	FW	(Scotland) SCO	Andy Love	35	12	34	12	1	0
	FW	(Scotland) SCO	Bob McDermid (c)	29	4	28	4	1	0
	FW	(Scotland) SCO	Adam McLean	26	8	25	8	1	0
	FW	(Scotland) SCO	Benny Yorston	18	8	18	8	0	0
	FW	(Scotland) SCO	Jack Beattie	17	2	17	2	0	0
	FW	(Scotland) SCO	David Galloway	14	1	14	1	0	0
	FW	(Scotland) SCO	Matt Armstrong	10	3	9	2	1	1
	FW	(Scotland) SCO	Percy Dickie	7	0	6	0	1	0
	FW	(Scotland) SCO	Dick Donald	6	6	6	6	0	0
	FW	(Scotland) SCO	Norman David	5	2	5	2	0	0
	FW	(Scotland) SCO	Joe McMeekin	5	0	5	0	0	0
	FW	(Scotland) SCO	Willie Paterson	1	0	1	0	0	0
