= 1928–29 Aberdeen F.C. season =

Aberdeen F.C.
1928–29 season
- Chairman: William Philip
- Manager: Paddy Travers
- Scottish League Division One: 7th
- Scottish Cup: 4th Round
- Highest home attendance: 35,000 vs. Rangers, 4 September
- Lowest home attendance: 10,000 vs. Clyde 1 February

The 1928–29 season was Aberdeen's 24th season in the top flight of Scottish football and their 25th season overall. Aberdeen competed in the Scottish League Division One and the Scottish Cup.

== Results ==
=== Division One ===
Match Day	Date	Opponent	H/A	Score	Aberdeen Scorer(s)	Attendance
1	11 August	Cowdenbeath	H	4–2	Cheyne, Yorston, Love, Smith	16,000
2	18 August	Queen's Park	H	3–0	Merrie (2), Yorston	10,000
3	25 August	Hibernian	A	1–4	Cheyne	10,000
4	1 September	St Mirren	A	2–5	Smith, McHale	7,000
5	8 September	St Johnstone	H	2–0	Love, Cheyne	15,000
6	15 September	Kilmarnock	A	1–0	Merrie	7,000
7	22 September	Clyde	H	3–1	Merrie (3)	12,000
8	24 September	Kilmarnock	H	2–1	Love, Merrie	13,000
9	29 September	Raith Rovers	H	3–1	Merrie (2), Cheyne	12,500
10	6 October	Motherwell	A	0–1		5,000
11	13 October	Airdrieonians	H	2–1	Cheyne (2)	12,000
12	20 October	Third Lanark	A	3–1	Cheyne, Merrie, Love	7,000
13	27 October	Heart of Midlothian	H	1–3	Merrie	16,000
14	3 November	Ayr United	A	3–3	Love (2), Smith	7,000
15	10 November	Celtic	H	2–2	Smith, Love (penalty)	15,500
16	17 November	Dundee	A	1–1	Yorston	15,000
17	24 November	Partick Thistle	A	2–3	Yorston, Smith	3,000
18	1 December	Hamilton Academical	H	4–1	Yorston (3), Cheyne	12,000
19	8 December	Rangers	A	0–2		15,000
20	15 December	Falkirk	H	5–3	Smith (2), Love (penalty), Yorston, McDermid	11,000
21	22 December	Queen's Park	A	2–6	Cheyne (2)	8,000
22	29 December	Cowdenbeath	A	1–1	Wilson	400
23	1 January	Third Lanark	H	4–0	Yorston (2), Love, Cheyne	12,000
24	2 January	Heart of Midlothian	A	2–3	Yorston, Falloon	14,000
25	5 January	Hibernian	H	0–1		14,500
26	12 January	St Mirren	H	6–0	Yorston (2), McDermid, Wilson, McLeod, Cheyne	14,000
27	26 January	Falkirk	A	0–2		7,000
28	9 February	Clyde	A	1–2	Yorston	7,000
29	20 February	Raith Rovers	A	2–2	Yorston (2)	1,500
30	23 February	Motherwell	H	1–1	Yorston	12,500
31	9 March	Ayr United	H	2–1	Cheyne (2)	12,000
32	12 March	Airdrieonians	A	0–5		3,000
33	16 March	Celtic	A	2–2	Love, Hill	6,000
34	23 March	Dundee	H	4–0	Cheyne (2), Yorston, McDermid	12,000
35	30 March	Partick Thistle	H	5–0	Yorston (3), Love (2)	12,000
36	6 April	Hamilton Academical	A	2–3	Yorston, Love	4,000
37	20 April	Rangers	H	2–2	Smith, Cheyne	18,000
38	27 April	St Johnstone	A	1–2	Love	4,500

==== Final standings ====
Pos	Team	Pld	W	D	L	GF	GA	GD	Pts
5	Queen's Park	38	18	7	13	100	69	+31	43
6	Partick Thistle	38	17	7	14	91	70	+21	41
7	Aberdeen	38	16	8	14	81	68	+13	40
8	St Mirren	38	16	8	14	78	75	+3	40
9	St Johnstone	38	14	10	14	57	70	−13	38

=== Scottish Cup ===
Round	Date	Opponent	H/A	Score	Aberdeen Scorer(s)	Attendance
R1	19 January	Solway Star	H	5–0	Yorston (2), Cheyne, Smith, McHale	
R2	2 February	Queen's Park	H	4–0	Yorston (3), Smith	
R3	16 February	Falkirk	A	5–3	Yorston (4), Smith	
R4	5 March	St Mirren	A	3–4	Yorston, Cheyne, Smith	

== Squad ==
=== Appearances & Goals ===
No.	Pos	Nat	Player	Total		Division One		Scottish Cup	
No.	Pos	Nat	Player	Apps	Goals	Apps	Goals	Apps	Goals
	GK	(Scotland) SCO	Duncan Yuill	38	0	34	0	4	0
	GK	(England) ENG	Harry Blackwell	4	0	4	0	0	0
	DF	(Scotland) SCO	Jimmy Black	42	0	38	0	4	0
	DF	(Scotland) SCO	Willie Jackson	40	0	36	0	4	0
	DF	(Scotland) SCO	Doug Livingstone	38	0	34	0	4	0
	DF	(Scotland) SCO	Hugh McLaren	17	0	17	0	0	0
	DF	(Scotland) SCO	Willie Cooper	3	0	3	0	0	0
	DF	(Scotland) SCO	Malcolm Muir	3	0	3	0	0	0
	DF	(Scotland) SCO	Ned Legge	1	0	1	0	0	0
	MF	(Scotland) SCO	Jimmy Smith	38	12	34	8	4	4
	MF	(Scotland) SCO	Jock McHale	24	2	20	1	4	1
	MF	(Scotland) SCO	Frank Hill	14	1	14	1	0	0
	MF	(Northern Ireland) NIR	Eddie Falloon	1	1	1	1	0	0
	MF	(Scotland) SCO	John Polland	1	0	0	0	0	0
	MF	(Scotland) SCO	Daniel McKenzie	1	0	1	0	0	0
	FW	(Scotland) SCO	Alec Cheyne	39	20	35	18	4	2
	FW	(Scotland) SCO	Bob McDermid (c)	38	3	34	3	4	0
	FW	(Scotland) SCO	Benny Yorston	35	32	31	22	4	10
	FW	(Scotland) SCO	Andy Love	34	14	30	14	4	0
	FW	(Scotland) SCO	Tom McLeod	27	0	23	0	4	0
	FW	(Scotland) SCO	Alex Merrie	14	11	14	11	0	0
	FW	(Scotland) SCO	John Wilson	9	2	9	2	0	0
	FW	(Scotland) SCO	John MacFarlane	1	0	1	0	0	0
	FW	(Scotland) SCO	Andrew Haughney	0	0	0	0	0	0
	FW	(Scotland) SCO	Norman David	0	0	0	0	0	0
