= Douglas Livingstone =

Douglas Livingstone or Doug Livingstone is the name of:

- Douglas Livingstone (poet) (1932–1996), South African poet born in Malaya
- Douglas Livingstone (actor) (1934–2021), English actor; wrote Boys from the Bush TV series
- Doug Livingstone (1898–1981), Scottish footballer and manager
