= Alec Cheyne =

Scottish footballer

Personal information
- Full name: Alexander George Cheyne
- Date of birth: 28 April 1907
- Place of birth: Glasgow, Scotland
- Date of death: 5 July 1983 (aged 76)
- Place of death: Arbroath, Scotland
- Height: 5 ft 8 in (1.73 m)
- Position: Inside forward

Senior career*
Years	Team	Apps	(Gls)
–	Shettleston Juniors		
1925–1930	Aberdeen	126	(49)
1930–1932	Chelsea	53	(10)
1932–1934	Nîmes	??	(??)
1934–1936	Chelsea	9	(2)
1937–1939	Colchester United	64	(35)
Total		252+	(96+)

International career
1929–1930	Scotland	5	(4)
1929	Scottish League XI	1	(0)

Managerial career
- 1949–1955: Arbroath
- * Club domestic league appearances and goals

Alexander George Cheyne (28 April 1907 – 5 July 1983) was a Scottish footballer who played as an inside forward. He is reputed to have been responsible for the Hampden Roar following his goal in the 'Cheyne International' of 1929.

== Playing career ==
=== Aberdeen ===
Cheyne began as a professional for Aberdeen, signing in 1925 from Shettleston Juniors. During his time at Pittodrie he became an idol of the locals, and his goals helped improve the team from regular mid-table finishes to third place in his final season.

=== Chelsea and Nîmes ===
Cheyne joined David Calderhead's Chelsea in 1930 for a club record fee of £6,000 but, despite playing alongside other talented forwards such as Hughie Gallacher and Alex Jackson, he struggled to settle.

He joined French club Nîmes Olympique in 1932. He returned to Chelsea two years later, finally leaving in 1936.

=== International ===
Cheyne won five caps for Scotland national team, scoring four goals, including a hat-trick against Norway and a goal direct from a corner against England—a feat legalised just the season before. This last goal is credited with starting the 'Hampden Roar': with Scotland down to ten players and less than a minute remaining of the game, over 110,000 fans took up a roar of encouragement, continuing past the final whistle and becoming a tradition at Scotland home games. Cheyne is reported to have made scoring from corners something of a speciality, having performed the feat twice more for his club side the following season.

== Coaching and managerial career ==
Upon retiring Cheyne moved into coaching, initially with Chelmsford City winning trophies in the Southern Football League. He then became manager of Arbroath, though without success.

== Career statistics ==
=== Club ===
Appearances and goals by club, season and competition
Club	Season	League			National Cup		Other		Total	
Club	Season	Division	Apps	Goals	Apps	Goals	Apps	Goals	Apps	Goals
Aberdeen	1925–26	Scottish Division One	3	0	0	0	-	-	3	0
Aberdeen	1926–27	Scottish Division One	23	7	2	1	-	-	25	8
Aberdeen	1927–28	Scottish Division One	31	9	1	0	-	-	32	9
Aberdeen	1928–29	Scottish Division One	35	18	4	2	-	-	39	20
Aberdeen	1929–30	Scottish Division One	34	15	4	4	-	-	38	19
Aberdeen	Total		126	49	11	7	-	-	137	56
Chelsea	1930–31	First Division	34	9	5	1	-	-	39	10
Chelsea	1931–32	First Division	19	1	2	0	-	-	21	1
Chelsea	Total		53	10	7	1	-	-	60	11
Nîmes Olympique	1932–33	Ligue 1	-	-	-	-	-	-	-	-
Nîmes Olympique	1933–34	Ligue 1	-	-	-	-	-	-	-	-
Nîmes Olympique	Total		-	-	-	-	-	-	-	-
Chelsea	1934–35	First Division	3	1	0	0	-	-	3	1
Chelsea	1935–36	First Division	6	1	0	0	-	-	6	1
Chelsea	1936–37	First Division	0	0	0	0	-	-	0	0
Chelsea	Total		9	2	0	0	-	-	9	2
Colchester United	1937–38	Southern Football League	32	19	-	-	22	16	54	35
Colchester United	1938–39	Southern Football League	29	14	2	0	9	7	40	21
Colchester United	1939–40	Southern Football League	3	2	-	-	-	-	3	2
Colchester United	Total		64	35	2	0	31	23	97	58
Career total			252+	96+	20+	8+	31+	23+	303+	127+

=== International ===
Appearances and goals by national team and year
National team	Year	Apps	Goals
Scotland	1929	4	4
Scotland	1930	1	0
Total		5	4

Scores and results list Scotland's goal tally first, score column indicates score after each Cheyne goal

List of international goals scored by Alec Cheyne
No.	Date	Venue	Opponent	Score	Result	Competition
1	13 April 1929	Hampden Park, Glasgow	England	1–0	1–0	1928–29 British Home Championship
2	26 May 1929	Brann Stadion, Bergen	Norway	3–1	7–3	Friendly
3	26 May 1929	Brann Stadion, Bergen	Norway	6–2	7–3	Friendly
4	26 May 1929	Brann Stadion, Bergen	Norway	7–2	7–3	Friendly

=== Managerial record ===
Team	From	To	Record				
Team	From	To	P	W	L	D	Win %
Arbroath	1949	1955	255	58	120	47	25.78%
Total			255	58	120	47	25.78%

== Honours ==
Colchester United

- Southern Football League: 1938–39
- Southern Football League Cup: 1937–38

== See also ==
- List of Scotland national football team hat-tricks
