= Jimmy Smith (footballer, born 1896) =

Scottish footballer

Personal information
- Full name: James Smith
- Date of birth: 25 June 1896
- Place of birth: Loudoun, Scotland
- Date of death: 24 November 1945 (aged 49)
- Place of death: Aberdeen, Scotland
- Height: 5 ft 7 in (1.70 m)
- Position: Outside left

Youth career
- Motherwell Hearts

Senior career*
| Years | Team | Apps | (Gls) |
| – | Wishaw Heather | | |
| – | Larkhall Thistle | | |
| 1919–1922 | Rangers | 17 | (1) |
| 1922–1931 | Aberdeen | 297 | (54) |
| 1931–1934 | Shamrock Rovers | | |
| 1934–1935 | Glentoran | | |
| 1935–1936 | Brora Rangers | | |

Managerial career
- 1936–1938: Dufftown
- * Club domestic league appearances and goals

James Smith (25 June 1896 – 24 November 1945) was a Scottish footballer who played for clubs including Rangers and Aberdeen as an outside left, though he began his career as a left back. He was the son of Nicol Smith, who also played as a defender with great success for Rangers and Scotland.

== Career statistics ==
Appearances and goals by club, season and competition
| Club | Season | League | | | National Cup | | Total | |
| Club | Season | Division | Apps | Goals | Apps | Goals | Apps | Goals |
|---|---|---|---|---|---|---|---|---|
| Rangers | 1919-20 | Scottish Division One | 6 | 0 | 0 | 0 | 6 | 0 |
| Rangers | 1920-21 | Scottish Division One | 9 | 0 | 0 | 0 | 9 | 0 |
| Rangers | 1921-22 | Scottish Division One | 2 | 1 | 0 | 0 | 2 | 1 |
| Rangers | Total | | 17 | 1 | 0 | 0 | 17 | 1 |
| Aberdeen | 1922-23 | Scottish Division One | 35 | 4 | 5 | 3 | 40 | 7 |
| Aberdeen | 1923-24 | Scottish Division One | 35 | 7 | 7 | 0 | 42 | 7 |
| Aberdeen | 1924-25 | Scottish Division One | 37 | 3 | 6 | 0 | 43 | 3 |
| Aberdeen | 1925-26 | Scottish Division One | 37 | 9 | 9 | 2 | 46 | 11 |
| Aberdeen | 1926-27 | Scottish Division One | 26 | 5 | 0 | 0 | 26 | 5 |
| Aberdeen | 1927-28 | Scottish Division One | 35 | 11 | 1 | 0 | 36 | 11 |
| Aberdeen | 1928-29 | Scottish Division One | 34 | 8 | 4 | 4 | 38 | 12 |
| Aberdeen | 1929-30 | Scottish Division One | 36 | 5 | 4 | 1 | 40 | 6 |
| Aberdeen | 1930-31 | Scottish Division One | 22 | 2 | 3 | 0 | 25 | 2 |
| Aberdeen | Total | | 297 | 54 | 39 | 10 | 336 | 64 |
| Shamrock Rovers | 1931-34 | - | - | - | - | - | - | - |
| Glentoran | 1934-35 | - | - | - | - | - | - | - |
| Brora Rangers | 1935-36 | - | - | - | - | - | - | - |
| Career total | | | 314+ | 55+ | 39+ | 10+ | 353+ | 65+ |
