= Jock Edward =

Scottish footballer

Personal information
- Date of birth: 2 February 1901
- Place of birth: Camlachie, Glasgow, Scotland
- Date of death: 30 March 1961 (aged 60)
- Place of death: Aberdeen, Scotland
- Height: 5 ft 0 in (1.52 m)
- Position: Half-back

Senior career*
Years	Team	Apps	(Gls)
1924–1928	Aberdeen	87	(3)
1928–19??	Southampton	0	(0)
- * Club domestic league appearances and goals

John Edward (2 February 1901 – 30 March 1961) was a Scottish professional football half-back who played for Aberdeen and Southampton.

== Career statistics ==
Appearances and goals by club, season and competition
Club	Season	League			National Cup		Total	
Club	Season	Division	Apps	Goals	Apps	Goals	Apps	Goals
Aberdeen	1923-24	Scottish Division One	0	0	0	0	0	0
Aberdeen	1924-25	Scottish Division One	25	2	4	0	29	2
Aberdeen	1925-26	Scottish Division One	17	0	9	0	26	0
Aberdeen	1926-27	Scottish Division One	37	1	3	0	40	1
Aberdeen	1927-28	Scottish Division One	8	0	0	0	8	0
Aberdeen	Total		87	3	16	0	103	3
