= Jimmy Black (footballer) =

Scottish footballer (1899–1933)

Personal information
- Full name: James Sneddon Black
- Date of birth: 22 May 1899
- Place of birth: Newtongrange, Scotland
- Date of death: 13 April 1933 (aged 33)
- Place of death: Edinburgh, Scotland
- Height: 5 ft 8 in (1.73 m)
- Position: Right half

Senior career*
Years	Team	Apps	(Gls)
- Newtongrange Star
1921–1925	Cowdenbeath	96	(3)
1925–1926	Springfield Babes		
1926–1927	Providence Clamdiggers		
1927–1932	Aberdeen	155	(4)

International career
1931	Scottish League XI	1	(0)
- * Club domestic league appearances and goals

James Sneddon Black (22 May 1899 – 13 April 1933) was a Scottish footballer who played as a right half for Aberdeen.

Black began his career with Cowdenbeath and moved to America to play for Providence Clamdiggers and Springfield Babes. Upon returning to Scotland to join Aberdeen, he was suspended by the American Soccer League after a dispute about the ownership of the The suspension was eventually lifted, allowing him to play for Aberdeen.

Black was implicated in the so-called 'Great Mystery' of 1931 which saw five players leave the club amid rumours of match-fixing.

== Career statistics ==
Appearances and goals by club, season and competition
Club	Season	League			Scottish Cup		Total	
Club	Season	Division	Apps	Goals	Apps	Goals	Apps	Goals
Aberdeen	1927–28	Scottish Division One	29	1	1	0	30	1
Aberdeen	1928–29	Scottish Division One	38	0	4	0	42	0
Aberdeen	1929–30	Scottish Division One	37	1	4	0	41	1
Aberdeen	1930–31	Scottish Division One	35	1	6	0	41	1
Aberdeen	1931–32	Scottish Division One	16	1	0	0	16	1
Aberdeen	Total		155	4	15	0	170	4
