= Eddie Falloon =

Irish footballer

Personal information
- Full name: Edward Falloon
- Date of birth: 20 December 1903
- Place of birth: Larne, Ireland
- Date of death: 4 July 1963 (aged 59)
- Place of death: Larne, Northern Ireland
- Height: 5 ft 5 in (1.65 m)
- Position: Defender

Senior career*
Years	Team	Apps	(Gls)
1922–1927	Crusaders	??	(??)
1927–1938	Aberdeen	224	(6)
1938–1939	Clyde	44	(0)
1939–1940	Larne	??	(??)
1940–1941	Crusaders	??	(??)
Total		267+	(6+)

International career
1931–1932	Ireland	2	(0)
- * Club domestic league appearances and goals

Edward Falloon (20 December 1903 – 4 July 1963) was an Irish professional football defender who played for Crusaders, Aberdeen, Clyde and Larne.

== Playing career ==
=== Club career ===
Falloon began his career with Belfast club Crusaders in the 1922/23 season. In 1927, he signed for Scottish club Aberdeen as a forward, before converting to a centre-half. In 1937, he was captain of Aberdeen in their first Scottish Cup final against Celtic, which Aberdeen lost 2–1.

In the following season, 1937–38, he signed for Clyde in a £700 deal. In 1939, he won the Scottish Cup as Clyde beat Motherwell in the final 4–0. That was one of his last games for the club and in Scotland, as he soon moved to his hometown club Larne. After one season there, he rejoined Crusaders and played for one more season before retiring in 1941.

=== International career ===
Falloon won two caps for Ireland, in 1931 and 1932, both against Scotland.

== Career statistics ==
=== Appearances and goals by club, season and competition ===
Club	Season	League			National Cup		Total	
Club	Season	Division	Apps	Goals	Apps	Goals	Apps	Goals
Crusaders	1922-23	Irish Intermediate League	-	-	-	-	-	-
Crusaders	1923-24	Irish Intermediate League	-	-	-	-	-	-
Crusaders	1924-25	Irish Intermediate League	-	-	-	-	-	-
Crusaders	1925-26	Irish Intermediate League	-	-	-	-	-	-
Crusaders	1926-27	Irish Intermediate League	-	-	-	-	-	-
Crusaders	Total		-	-	-	-	-	-
Aberdeen	1927-28	Scottish Division One	2	0	0	0	2	0
Aberdeen	1928-29	Scottish Division One	1	1	0	0	1	1
Aberdeen	1929-30	Scottish Division One	6	0	1	0	7	0
Aberdeen	1930-31	Scottish Division One	13	0	4	0	17	0
Aberdeen	1931-32	Scottish Division One	21	3	1	0	22	3
Aberdeen	1932-33	Scottish Division One	33	1	3	0	36	1
Aberdeen	1933-34	Scottish Division One	31	0	4	0	35	0
Aberdeen	1934-35	Scottish Division One	32	1	4	0	36	1
Aberdeen	1935-36	Scottish Division One	34	0	5	0	39	0
Aberdeen	1936-37	Scottish Division One	34	0	4	0	38	0
Aberdeen	1937-38	Scottish Division One	16	0	0	0	16	0
Aberdeen	Total		223	6	26	0	249	6
Clyde	1937-38	Scottish Division One	-	-	-	-	-	-
Clyde	1938-39	Scottish Division One	-	-	-	-	-	-
Clyde	Total		44	0	-	-	44+	0+
Larne	1939-40	Irish League	-	-	-	-	-	-
Larne	Total		-	-	-	-	-	-
Crusaders	1940-41	Irish Intermediate League	-	-	-	-	-	-
Crusaders	Total		-	-	-	-	-	-
Career total			267+	6+	26+	0+	249+	6+

=== International ===
Appearances and goals by national team and year
National team	Year	Apps	Goals
Ireland	1931	1	0
Ireland	1932	1	0
Total		2	0

== Honours ==
Aberdeen

- Scottish Cup runner up: 1937

Clyde

- Scottish Cup winner: 1939
