= Harry Blackwell =

English footballer (1900–1956)

Personal information
- Full name: Clifford Harold Blackwell
- Date of birth: 1 January 1900
- Place of birth: Sheffield, England
- Date of death: 7 March 1956 (aged 56)
- Place of death: Aberdeen, Scotland
- Height: 5 ft 9 in (1.75 m)
- Position: Goalkeeper

Senior career*
Years	Team	Apps	(Gls)
- Heeley Friends
- Scunthorpe & Lindsey United
1921–1930	Aberdeen	216	(0)
1930–1931	Leyton Orient	15	(0)
1932	Preston North End	0	(0)
- Forfar Athletic
- * Club domestic league appearances and goals

Harry Blackwell was an English professional football goalkeeper who played for Scunthorpe United, Aberdeen, Leyton Orient and Preston North End.

While at Aberdeen, Blackwell played in the club's record 13–0 win over Peterhead, wearing a waterproof coat and an umbrella borrowed from a spectator in the inclement weather.

== Career statistics ==
Appearances and goals by club, season and competition
Club	Season	League			Scottish Cup		Total	
Club	Season	Division	Apps	Goals	Apps	Goals	Apps	Goals
Aberdeen	1921–22	Scottish Division One	17	0	7	0	24	0
Aberdeen	1922–23	Scottish Division One	38	0	5	0	43	0
Aberdeen	1923–24	Scottish Division One	38	0	7	0	45	0
Aberdeen	1924–25	Scottish Division One	37	0	6	0	43	0
Aberdeen	1925–26	Scottish Division One	36	0	9	0	45	0
Aberdeen	1926–27	Scottish Division One	18	0	1	0	19	0
Aberdeen	1927–28	Scottish Division One	26	0	1	0	27	0
Aberdeen	1928–29	Scottish Division One	4	0	0	0	0	0
Aberdeen	1929–30	Scottish Division One	2	0	0	0	2	0
Aberdeen	Total		216	0	36	0	252	0
