= Willie Jackson (footballer) =

Scottish footballer

Personal information
- Full name: William Kennedy Jackson
- Date of birth: 24 December 1900
- Place of birth: Renton, Scotland
- Date of death: 9 February 1986 (aged 85)
- Place of death: Aberdeen, Scotland
- Height: 5 ft 10 in (1.78 m)
- Positions: Inside left; defender

Senior career*
Years	Team	Apps	(Gls)
–	Vale of Leven Juniors		
–	Duntocher Hibernian		
1921–1922	Vale of Leven	28	(9)
1922	Everton		
1922–1924	Wrexham		
1924–1925	Vale of Leven	24	(12)
1925–1932	Aberdeen	183	(7)
1932–1934	Vale of Leven		
1934–1935	Forfar Athletic	10	(1)
1934–1935	St Johnstone	0	(0)
- * Club domestic league appearances and goals

William Kennedy Jackson (24 December 1900 – 9 February 1986) was a Scottish professional football defender who played for clubs including Vale of Leven, Wrexham and Aberdeen.

Jackson began his career at Vale of Leven, with his form there earning him a move to England with Everton in March 1922; however he made little impact and moved on to Wrexham six months later, where he won the Welsh Cup in 1924.

Jackson then returned to Vale of Leven, was made captain, soon again attracted attention from bigger teams, and this time signed for Aberdeen in March 1925. For a brief period he was one of four men of the same surname in the line-up at Pittodrie, along with defender James and the brothers Wattie and Alex (who were from the same district as Willie but not related to him). He remained with the Dons until 1932, making 206 appearances in the Scottish Football League and Scottish Cup, albeit with no major trophies won: he played in a Scottish Cup semi-final defeat to Celtic in 1926, and the club finished third in the 1929–30 season, by which time Jackson, who originally played as a centre forward or inside left, had converted to a defender.

== Career statistics ==
Appearances and goals by club, season and competition
Club	Season	League			Scottish Cup		Total	
Club	Season	Division	Apps	Goals	Apps	Goals	Apps	Goals
Aberdeen	1924–25	Scottish Division One	6	0	0	0	6	0
Aberdeen	1925–26	Scottish Division One	35	6	5	1	40	7
Aberdeen	1926–27	Scottish Division One	21	0	3	0	24	0
Aberdeen	1927–28	Scottish Division One	38	0	1	0	39	0
Aberdeen	1928–29	Scottish Division One	36	0	4	0	40	0
Aberdeen	1929–30	Scottish Division One	5	0	4	0	9	0
Aberdeen	1930–31	Scottish Division One	29	0	6	0	35	0
Aberdeen	1931–32	Scottish Division One	13	1	0	0	13	1
Aberdeen	1932–33	Scottish Division One	0	0	0	0	0	0
Aberdeen	Total		183	7	23	1	206	8

== Honours ==
Wrexham

- Welsh Cup: 1924
