= Lachie McMillan =

Scottish footballer

Personal information
- Full name: Lachlan McMillan
- Date of birth: 1900
- Place of birth: Hamilton, Scotland
- Date of death: 1983 (aged 82–83)
- Place of death: Hamilton, Scotland
- Height: 5 ft 8 in (1.73 m)
- Position: Inside left

Senior career*
Years	Team	Apps	(Gls)
–	Larkhall Thistle		
1919–1920	Petershill		
1920	Rutherglen Glencairn		
1920–1924	Hamilton Academical	111	(33)
1922	→ Royal Albert (loan)		
1924–1934	Heart of Midlothian	163	(50)
1931	→ Aberdeen (loan)	1	(1)
1932–1933	→ Partick Thistle (loan)	22	(4)
1934	Third Lanark	9	(0)
1934–1937	Elgin City		
Total		307	(87)

Managerial career
- 1934–1937: Elgin City
- Armadale Thistle
- * Club domestic league appearances and goals

Lachlan McMillan (1900–1983) was a Scottish footballer who played as an inside left, mainly for Hamilton Academical and Heart of Midlothian.

He made more than 300 appearances in the Scottish Football League's top division across 14 seasons but won no major honours (he won the minor Lanarkshire Cup, Rosebery Charity Cup, Dunedin Cup, East of Scotland Shield and Wilson Cup with his two main clubs, and played on the losing side in the Glasgow Cup final of 1932, while on loan to Partick Thistle). He scored a hat-trick on his Hearts debut in the Wilson Cup final of 1924, an Edinburgh Derby victory over Hibernian.

The closest he came to any representative honours was an appearance in an SFL XI trial in 1925.

As his playing career came to an end, McMillan had a spell at Elgin City (then members of the Highland League) as player-manager, winning the Scottish Qualifying Cup in 1935, and later served in the Royal Air Force during World War II.
