= Hugh McLaren (footballer, born 1901) =

Scottish footballer (1901–1971)

Personal information
- Full name: Hugh McDonald McLaren
- Date of birth: 13 January 1901
- Place of birth: Kilwinning, Scotland
- Date of death: 8 March 1971 (aged 70)
- Place of death: Littleborough, England
- Height: 5 ft 9 in (1.75 m)
- Position: Centre half

Senior career*
Years	Team	Apps	(Gls)
- Dalry Thistle
1924–1928	Nithsdale Wanderers	102	(6)
1928–1932	Aberdeen	105	(5)
1928	→ Nithsdale Wanderers (loan)		
1929	→ Kilmarnock (loan)	0	(0)
1932–1933	Workington		
1933–1935	Bradford City	24	(1)
1935–1936	Tranmere Rovers		
1936–1937	Rochdale		
- Ashley Bridge
Total		231	(12)
- * Club domestic league appearances and goals

Hugh McDonald McLaren (13 January 1901 – 8 March 1971) was a Scottish professional footballer who played as a centre half.

== Career ==
Born in Kilwinning, McLaren played for Dalry Thistle, Nithsdale Wanderers, Aberdeen, Kilmarnock, Workington, Bradford City, Tranmere Rovers, Rochdale and Ashley Bridge.

During a short loan at Kilmarnock from Aberdeen he played only two games: the semi-final and final of the 1928–29 Scottish Cup, returning north with a winner's medal after helping the Killie defence keep clean sheets against the forwards of Celtic at Ibrox followed by Rangers at Hampden. He joined Bradford City in June 1933 from Workington. He made 24 league appearances for the club, scoring once, and also made 1 appearance in the FA Cup. He left the club in July 1935, signing for Tranmere Rovers.

== Career statistics ==
Appearances and goals by club, season and competition
Club	Season	League			Scottish Cup		Total	
Club	Season	Division	Apps	Goals	Apps	Goals	Apps	Goals
Aberdeen	1927–28	Scottish Division One	0	0	0	0	0	0
Aberdeen	1928–29	Scottish Division One	17	0	0	0	17	0
Aberdeen	1929–30	Scottish Division One	33	2	4	1	37	3
Aberdeen	1930–31	Scottish Division One	36	3	6	0	42	3
Aberdeen	1931–32	Scottish Division One	19	0	0	0	19	0
Total			105	5	10	1	115	6

== Sources ==
- Frost, Terry (1988). Bradford City A Complete Record 1903–1988. Breedon Books Sport. ISBN 0-907969-38-0.
