= Bob McDermid =

Scottish footballer

Personal information
- Full name: Robert Forsyth McDermid
- Date of birth: 26 September 1895
- Place of birth: Alexandria, Scotland
- Date of death: 19 August 1952 (aged 56)
- Place of death: Largs, Scotland
- Height: 5 ft 10 in (1.78 m)
- Position: Inside forward

Senior career*
Years	Team	Apps	(Gls)
1916–1917	Queen's Park	29	(11)
1917–1918	Rangers	35	(5)
1918–1921	Dumbarton	95	(28)
1921–1925	Rangers	17	(7)
1923–1925	→ Queen of the South (loan)	58	(25)
1925–1933	Aberdeen	246	(44)
Total		480	(120)
- * Club domestic league appearances and goals

Robert Forsyth McDermid (26 September 1895 – 19 August 1952) was a Scottish professional footballer who played for Rangers, Dumbarton, Queen of the South and Aberdeen.

== Rangers ==
McDermid began his career at Queen's Park, then joined Rangers where he was a regular member of the side in his first season, 1917–18, finishing as champions. By early 1919 he was no longer in the plans of the Rangers management and was transferred to Dumbarton, then returned to Rangers in 1921 only to be subsequently loaned out to Dumfries club Queen of the South two years later.

== Queen of the South ==
Revitalised by the move, McDermid found inspired form at Queens.

Along with Joe Dodds and Bob McDougall, McDermid was with Queen of the South when they first joined the Scottish Football League in 1923–34 at its lowest level, the newly created Scottish Third Division. Queens finished a creditable third, but their biggest achievement that season was in the Scottish Qualifying Cup. Then considerably more prestigious than now, Queens brought the cup to the Southwest for the first time in its 25-year history. In the final replay, a surging run through the opposition half and shot from McDermid opened the scoring. Next, McDermid's 'dummy' let Bert Lister in to hit the second. McDermid's left foot finish sealed the 3–0 win and Queens were crowned cup winners. The train bringing the players and the trophy back to Dumfries were met by crowds of jubilant well-wishers on the platforms and surrounding streets and approaches. The team was then entertained at the Town Hall Buildings on Buccleuch Street.

== Aberdeen ==
Such was McDermid's form at Queens that Aberdeen moved for him in 1925, in what many regarded as the twilight of his career. Aberdonians advocate that it was there McDermid enjoyed the best days of his career – he spent eight years at Pittodrie and became club captain.

After retiring from playing, McDermid became the club trainer.

== Career statistics ==
Appearances and goals by club, season and competition
Club	Season	League			Scottish Cup		Total	
Club	Season	Division	Apps	Goals	Apps	Goals	Apps	Goals
Queens Park	1916–17	Scottish Division One	29	11	–	–	29	11
Rangers	1917–18	Scottish Division One	28	4	–	–	28	4
Rangers	1918–19	Scottish Division One	7	1	–	–	7	1
Rangers	Total		35	5	-	-	35	5
Dumbarton	1918–19	Scottish Division One	16	4	–	–	16	4
Dumbarton	1919–20	Scottish Division One	41	17	2	0	43	17
Dumbarton	1920–21	Scottish Division One	38	7	3	2	41	9
Dumbarton	Total		95	28	5	2	100	30
Rangers	1920–21	Scottish Division One	2	0	0	0	2	0
Rangers	1921–22	Scottish Division One	15	7	3	2	18	9
Rangers	1922–23	Scottish Division One	0	0	0	0	0	0
Rangers	1923–24	Scottish Division One	0	0	0	0	0	0
Rangers	1924–25	Scottish Division One	0	0	0	0	0	0
Rangers	Total		17	7	3	2	20	9
Queen Of The South (loan)	1923–24	Scottish Division Three	–	–	–	–	–	–
Queen Of The South (loan)	1924–25	Scottish Division Three	–	–	–	–	–	–
Queen Of The South (loan)	Total		58	25	-	-	58+	25+
Aberdeen	1925–26	Scottish Division One	34	8	9	1	43	9
Aberdeen	1926–27	Scottish Division One	38	8	2	0	40	8
Aberdeen	1927–28	Scottish Division One	34	4	1	0	35	4
Aberdeen	1928–29	Scottish Division One	34	3	4	0	38	3
Aberdeen	1929–30	Scottish Division One	35	4	4	3	39	7
Aberdeen	1930–31	Scottish Division One	36	12	6	1	42	13
Aberdeen	1931–32	Scottish Division One	28	4	1	0	29	4
Aberdeen	1932–33	Scottish Division One	7	1	0	0	7	1
Aberdeen	Total		246	44	27	5	273	49
Career total			480	120	35+	9+	515+	129+
