= Frank Hill =

Scottish footballer and manager

Personal information
- Full name: Frank Robert Hill
- Date of birth: 21 May 1906
- Place of birth: Forfar, Scotland
- Date of death: 28 August 1993 (aged 87)
- Place of death: Lafayette, California, United States
- Height: 5 ft 8 in (1.73 m)
- Position: Right half

Senior career*
Years	Team	Apps	(Gls)
1924–1928	Forfar Athletic	119	(26)
1928–1932	Aberdeen	98	(9)
1932–1936	Arsenal	76	(4)
1936–1937	Blackpool	45	(8)
1937–1939	Southampton	51	(3)
1944–1948	Crewe Alexandra	20	(0)

International career
1930–1931	Scotland	3	(0)
1930	Scottish League XI	1	(0)

Managerial career
- 1944–1948: Crewe Alexandra (Player-manager)
- 1948–1954: Burnley
- 1954–1956: Preston North End
- 1957: Al-Quwa Al-Jawiya
- 1958–1961: Notts County
- 1961–1965: Charlton Athletic
- * Club domestic league appearances and goals

Frank Robert Hill (21 May 1906 – 28 August 1993) was a Scottish football player and manager.

== Playing career ==
=== Forfar and Aberdeen ===
Hill was born in Forfar and started his career at Forfar Athletic, joining the club in 1924. He moved to Aberdeen in 1928 and played over 100 Scottish Division One matches. A right-half (which was more or less the equivalent of a defensive midfield position), Hill earned the nickname "Tiger" for his "tigerish" tackling. During his four years at Aberdeen, he also won three caps for Scotland (between 1930 and 1931).

Hill left Aberdeen under something of a cloud, being one of five players dropped by manager Paddy Travers in November 1931. At the time, the reasons were not clear, but the club's official history claims that several players had been involved in a betting scandal. No players were ever charged with any offence, but none of them ever played for Aberdeen again. Hill had played a total of 106 times for Aberdeen, scoring 10 goals.

=== Arsenal ===
In 1932, he was signed by Herbert Chapman's Arsenal, who had just finished as runners-up in both the First Division and FA Cup. He made his debut against Blackburn Rovers on 15 October 1932. At the time, Arsenal were spoilt for wing-halves and Hill competed for his place with Charlie Jones, Bob John, Wilf Copping and Jack Crayston. Despite this, Hill featured in all three of Arsenal's 1933, 1934 and 1935 League title campaigns. He also won the 1934 Charity Shield with the Gunners. Hill usually played at right-half but also deputised at left-half or even on the wing.

Hill was squeezed out of the side by Copping and Crayston, and only featured in ten matches in 1935–36, and did not play in Arsenal's FA Cup final victory that season. He requested a transfer and was sold to Second Division Blackpool in the summer of 1936. In all he played 81 games for Arsenal, scoring four goals.

=== Blackpool ===
Hill captained Blackpool in the 1936–37 season, helping them to runners-up spot and thus promotion to the First Division. However, he didn't stay in the top flight for long as in September 1937 he joined Second Division side Southampton.

=== Southampton ===
In May 1937, Hill was recruited by Tom Parker to join Southampton as part of his drive to strengthen the team in an attempt to gain promotion from the Second Division, along with David Affleck (from Clapton Orient), Billy Bevis (from Portsmouth) and Ray Parkin (from Middlesbrough). Southampton paid £2000 for his services and acquired "a half-back with a strong personality and ball-winning abilities". Hill's resolve and leadership helped steer Saints away from relegation during 1937–38, only for him to suffer a series of injuries the following season which sidelined him for long periods.

Hill eventually fell out with the Board of Directors when it was revealed that he had secretly applied for various managerial positions and he left the club in 1939 to take up a position as assistant trainer at Preston North End, although Southampton refused to release his player registration until 1943. He made 53 appearances for Southampton, scoring three goals.

During the Second World War, when football was suspended, Hill served in the Royal Air Force in India.

== Managerial career ==
Hill returned to Britain in 1944 and became player-manager of Crewe Alexandra (making 20 appearances, excluding Football War League games, and playing his last game for Crewe in February 1948) until he was 42. He went on to manage Burnley from September 1948 to 1954 then Preston North End from 1954 to 1956.

He then moved abroad in January 1957, coaching the Iraqi military team as well as Iraqi club Al-Quwa Al-Jawiya, before returning to take over at Notts County in 1958. He helped County to promotion to the Third Division in 1959–60, and moved to Charlton Athletic, who were bottom of the Second Division, in 1961. He saved Charlton from relegation that season and took them to fourth in 1963–64. However, he could not make the good form last and was sacked in the summer of 1965.

Hill finished his career as a scout for Manchester City, before retiring. He moved with his wife Doris and son David to Lafayette, California, USA in 1967 where they owned "Piccadilly Circus Fish'n Chips" and he refereed locally at the college level well into his 70s.

He died in California in August 1993, aged 87.

== Career statistics ==
=== Club ===
Appearances and goals by club, season and competition
Club	Season	League			National Cup		Total	
Club	Season	Division	Apps	Goals	Apps	Goals	Apps	Goals
Forfar Athletic	1924–25	Scottish Division Two	19	0	1	0	20	0
Forfar Athletic	1925–26	Scottish Division Three	25	0	3	0	28	0
Forfar Athletic	1926–27	Scottish Division Two	38	22	2	2	40	24
Forfar Athletic	1927–28	Scottish Division Two	37	4	2	0	39	4
Forfar Athletic	Total		119	26	8	2	127	28
Aberdeen	1928–29	Scottish Division One	14	1	0	0	14	1
Aberdeen	1929–30	Scottish Division One	37	1	3	0	40	1
Aberdeen	1930–31	Scottish Division One	30	3	5	1	35	4
Aberdeen	1931–32	Scottish Division One	17	4	0	0	17	4
Aberdeen	Total		98	9	8	1	106	10
Arsenal	1932–33	First Division	26	1	1	0	27	1
Arsenal	1933–34	First Division	25	0	1	0	26	0
Arsenal	1934–35	First Division	15	3	1	0	16	3
Arsenal	1935–36	First Division	10	0	0	0	10	0
Arsenal	Total		76	4	3	0	79	4
Blackpool	1936–37	Second Division	-	-	-	-	-	-
Blackpool	1937–38	First Division	-	-	-	-	-	-
Blackpool	Total		45	8	-	-	45+	8+
Southampton	1937–38	Second Division	32	1	1	0	33	1
Southampton	1938–39	Second Division	19	2	1	0	20	2
Southampton	Total		51	3	2	0	53	3
Crewe Alexandra	1946–47	Third Division North	15	0	-	-	15	0
Crewe Alexandra	1947–48	Third Division North	5	0	-	-	5	0
Crewe Alexandra	Total		20	0	-	-	20	0
Career total			409	50	21+	3+	430	53

=== International ===
Appearances and goals by national team and year
National team	Year	Apps	Goals
Scotland	1930	2	0
Scotland	1931	1	0
Total		3	0

=== Managerial record ===
Managerial record by team and tenure
Team	From	To	Record				
Team	From	To	P	W	D	L	Win %
Crewe Alexandra	1 July 1944	September 1948	102	45	19	38	44.1
Burnley	October 1948	August 1954	257	102	67	88	39.7
Preston North End	1 August 1954	1 May 1956	88	31	17	40	35.2
Notts County	1 October 1958	1 November 1961	151	61	29	61	40.4
Charlton Athletic	1 November 1961	1 August 1965	172	65	33	74	37.8
Total			770	304	165	301	39.5

== Honours ==
=== As a player ===
Arsenal

- Football League championship: 1932–33, 1933–34 and 1934–35
- Charity Shield: 1933, 1934

Blackpool

- Football League Division 2, runners-up: 1936–37

=== As a manager ===
Notts County

- Football League Division 4, runners-up: 1959–60
