= Hugh Adam =

Scottish football player (1925–2017)

- Born: 20 September 1925; Hamilton, Scotland
- Died: 29 December 2012 (aged 87); East Kilbride, Scotland
- Notable work: Glasgow Rangers F.C.
- Spouse: Jean Adam

Hugh Adam (20 September 1925 – 29 December 2012) was an investor in, and director of, Rangers F.C., working closely with Willie Waddell. He ran the Rangers Pools and later the Rangers Lottery.

His surname is often misspelled as "Adams".

== Career ==
Adam started his involvement with Rangers as a key investor in the Rangers Pools, a pool betting syndicate. He had little knowledge of football but was a good bookmaker. In the United Kingdom, gambling laws are strict but the government has no monopoly on betting, and anything freely traded is allowed under the common law. (Note: The Betting and Gaming Act 1960 was an attempt to restricted betting, and although passed into law, betting continued. The Weights and Measures Act 1968 sneaked in as a subsidiary clause that "cribbage, darts, bar billiards, pool, dominoes and shove-halfpenny" may be played for small stakes on those parts of the premises open to the public.". Which means it is legal to play for 50p for pool but not for snooker. The Act leaves deliberately vague what "small stakes" are. To play any other game in a public house is illegal, so, for example, to play bridge to canasta for small stakes—even matchsticks—is illegal. "Betting and the passing of betting slips" is illegal by the same Act. It is legal to place a mobile phone bet on one's own behalf in a public house but not on behalf of another. I have actually done a test case with magistrates in Hertfordshire to define that.)

=== 1971 ===
The 1971 Ibrox disaster was a crowd crush that led to 66 dead and over 200 severely injured. Adam took charge of the club to ensure that such would never happen again. Unfortunately, a similar disaster occurred many years later in the Hillsborough disaster, and in its aftermath the Taylor Report led to all-seater stadiums in the top tiers of UK soccer.

=== 1990s ===
Adam predicted that Rangers would suffer in the 1990s, but he continued to invest in the club until his death.

== 1998 ==
Sir David Murray bought out the club in 1998 and after that Adam had no financial interest in it. Adam disagreed vigorously with Murray about how the club should be organised.

== See also ==
- History of Rangers F.C.
