= 1934–35 Chelsea F.C. season =

English football club season

Chelsea
1934–35 season
- Chairman: Claude Kirby
- Manager: Leslie Knighton
- Stadium: Stamford Bridge
- First Division: 12th
- FA Cup: Third round
- Top goalscorer: League: Dick Spence (19); All: Dick Spence (19)
- Highest home attendance: 50,687 vs Derby County (29 December 1934)
- Lowest home attendance: 13,016 vs Birmingham City (6 March 1935)
- Average home league attendance: 31,961
- Biggest win: 7–1 v Leeds United (16 March 1935)
- Biggest defeat: 0–6 v Liverpool (20 April 1935)
Home colours	Away colours

The 1934–35 season was Chelsea Football Club's twenty-sixth competitive season.

== Table ==
Pos	Team	Pld	W	D	L	GF	GA	GAv	Pts
10	Stoke City	42	18	6	18	71	70	1.014	42
11	Preston North End	42	15	12	15	62	67	0.925	42
12	Chelsea	42	16	9	17	73	82	0.890	41
13	Aston Villa	42	14	13	15	74	88	0.841	41
14	Portsmouth	42	15	10	17	71	72	0.986	40

Source: World Football
Rules for classification: 1) Points; 2) Goal average; 3) Goals scored
