= Bobbie Bruce =

Scottish footballer and manager

Personal information
- Full name: Robert Frederick Bruce
- Date of birth: 29 January 1906
- Place of birth: Paisley, Scotland
- Date of death: 6 April 1978 (aged 72)
- Place of death: Johnstone, Scotland
- Height: 5 ft 6 in (1.68 m)
- Position: Inside left

Youth career
- St Anthony's

Senior career*
| Years | Team | Apps | (Gls) |
| 1924–1928 | Aberdeen | 94 | (36) |
| 1928–1935 | Middlesbrough | 231 | (65) |
| 1935–1936 | Sheffield Wednesday | 5 | (0) |
| 1936–1938 | Ipswich Town | | |
| 1938–1939 | Mossley | | |

International career
| 1933 | Scotland | 1 | (0) |

Managerial career
- 1938–1939: Mossley
- * Club domestic league appearances and goals

Robert Frederick Bruce (29 January 1906 – 6 April 1978) was a Scottish footballer.

Born in Paisley, Bruce was an inside left who developed with the Glaswegian junior side St. Anthony's. He spent his senior career with Aberdeen (1924–1928), Middlesbrough F.C. (1928–1935), Sheffield Wednesday F.C. (1935–1936), and Ipswich Town F.C. (1936–1938). His last club was Mossley A.F.C., where he held the role of player-manager during the 1938–39 season. He played once for the Scotland national team, against Austria in 1933.

== Career statistics ==
=== Club ===
Appearances and goals by club, season and competition
| Club | Season | League | | | National Cup | | Total | |
| Club | Season | Division | Apps | Goals | Apps | Goals | Apps | Goals |
|---|---|---|---|---|---|---|---|---|
| Aberdeen | 1924–25 | Scottish Division One | 16 | 2 | 6 | 0 | 22 | 2 |
| Aberdeen | 1925–26 | Scottish Division One | 17 | 3 | 6 | 2 | 23 | 5 |
| Aberdeen | 1926–27 | Scottish Division One | 36 | 20 | 3 | 4 | 39 | 24 |
| Aberdeen | 1927–28 | Scottish Division One | 25 | 11 | 1 | 3 | 26 | 14 |
| Aberdeen | Total | | 94 | 36 | 16 | 9 | 110 | 45 |
| Middlesbrough | 1928–29 | Second Division | - | - | - | - | - | - |
| Middlesbrough | 1929–30 | First Division | - | - | - | - | - | - |
| Middlesbrough | 1930–31 | First Division | - | - | - | - | - | - |
| Middlesbrough | 1931–32 | First Division | - | - | - | - | - | - |
| Middlesbrough | 1932–33 | First Division | - | - | - | - | - | - |
| Middlesbrough | 1933–34 | First Division | - | - | - | - | - | - |
| Middlesbrough | 1934–35 | First Division | - | - | - | - | - | - |
| Middlesbrough | 1935–36 | First Division | - | - | - | - | - | - |
| Middlesbrough | Total | | 231 | 65 | 22 | 6 | 253 | 71 |
| Sheffield Wednesday | 1935–36 | First Division | 5 | 0 | 0 | 0 | 5 | 0 |
| Ipswich Town | 1936–37 | Southern League | - | - | - | - | - | - |
| Ipswich Town | 1937–38 | Southern League | - | - | - | - | - | - |
| Ipswich Town | Total | | - | - | - | - | - | - |
| Mossley | 1938–39 | - | - | - | - | - | - | - |
| Career total | | | 330+ | 101+ | 38+ | 15+ | 368+ | 116+ |

=== International ===
Appearances and goals by national team and year
| National team | Year | Apps | Goals |
|---|---|---|---|
| Scotland | 1933 | 1 | 0 |
| Total | | 1 | 0 |

== Honours ==
Sheffield Wednesday

- FA Charity Shield: 1935
