= Benny Yorston =

Scottish footballer

Personal information
- Full name: Benjamin Collard Yorston
- Date of birth: 14 October 1905
- Place of birth: Nigg, Scotland
- Date of death: 1977 (aged 71–72)
- Height: 5 ft 5 in (1.65 m)
- Position: Striker

Senior career*
Years	Team	Apps	(Gls)
1927	Montrose		
1927–1931	Aberdeen	143	(101)
1932–1934	Sunderland	46	(24)
1934–1939	Middlesbrough	151	(54)
1941	Hibernian (guest)	0	(0)
1945	Dundee United	1	(0)
Total		340	(179)

International career
1931	Scotland	1	(0)
- * Club domestic league appearances and goals

Benjamin Collard Yorston (14 October 1905 – 1977) was a Scottish professional footballer who played for Montrose, Aberdeen, Sunderland and Middlesbrough.

== Career ==
Born in Nigg, Kincardineshire, the diminutive (5 ft 5in) forward played for Aberdeen juvenile sides Kittybrewster and Mugiemoss before joining Montrose in 1927. He spent only 3 months with the Gable Endies before returning north to sign for Aberdeen F.C.. Yorston stayed with the Dons for five seasons and remains the club's record goal-scorer for a single season, having notched 38 goals in 1929–30. He won his only cap for Scotland against Ireland in 1931.

Yorston was one of five Aberdeen players dropped after a 1–1 draw with Kilmarnock later that year. At the time, the reasons were not clear, but the club's official history claims that several players had been involved in a betting scandal. No players were ever charged with any offence, but none of them ever played for Aberdeen again.

Yorston joined Sunderland for £2,000 in January 1932 (£121,000 today) then moved to their North-East rivals Middlesbrough for £1,250 in 1934 (£77,000 today). He stayed with Middlesbrough until the outbreak of the Second World War, during which he "guested" for Hibernian, Aldershot, Reading, West Ham United and Lincoln City, featuring once for Dundee United shortly after the war ended. He retired before the cessation of global hostilities.

Yorston's nephew Harry was also a professional footballer who, like his uncle, played for Aberdeen and the Scottish national side.

== Career statistics ==
=== Club ===
Appearances and goals by club, season and competition
Club	Season	League			National Cup		Total	
Club	Season	Division	Apps	Goals	Apps	Goals	Apps	Goals
Aberdeen	1926–27	Scottish Division One	0	0	0	0	0	0
Aberdeen	1927–28	Scottish Division One	28	17	0	0	28	17
Aberdeen	1928–29	Scottish Division One	31	22	4	10	35	32
Aberdeen	1929–30	Scottish Division One	38	38	4	7	42	45
Aberdeen	1930–31	Scottish Division One	28	16	5	6	33	22
Aberdeen	1931–32	Scottish Division One	18	8	0	0	18	8
Aberdeen	Total		143	101	13	23	156	124
Sunderland	1931–32	First Division	14	11	0	0	14	11
Sunderland	1932–33	First Division	18	7	0	0	18	7
Sunderland	1933–34	First Division	14	6	3	1	17	7
Sunderland	Total		46	24	3	1	49	25
Middlesbrough	1933–34	First Division	12	7	-	-	12+	7+
Middlesbrough	1934–35	First Division	19	7	-	-	19+	7+
Middlesbrough	1935–36	First Division	42	13	-	-	42+	13+
Middlesbrough	1936–37	First Division	21	7	-	-	21+	7+
Middlesbrough	1937–38	First Division	25	8	-	-	25+	8+
Middlesbrough	1938–39	First Division	32	12	-	-	32+	12+
Middlesbrough	Total		151	54	-	-	151+	54+
Career total			340	179	16+	24+	342+	203+

=== International ===
Appearances and goals by national team and year
National team	Year	Apps	Goals
Scotland	1931	1	0
Total		1	0
