= Andy Love (Scottish footballer) =

Scottish footballer

Personal information
- Full name: Andrew Robb Love
- Date of birth: 26 March 1905
- Place of birth: Renfrew, Scotland
- Date of death: 3 November 1962 (aged 57)
- Place of death: Peterculter, Aberdeenshire
- Position: Winger

Youth career
- Kirkintilloch Rob Roy

Senior career*
Years	Team	Apps	(Gls)
1925–1935	Aberdeen	216	(79)
1935–1937	Aldershot		
1937–1939	Montrose		

International career
1929	Scottish League XI	1	(0)
1931	Scotland	3	(1)
- * Club domestic league appearances and goals

Andrew Robb Love (26 March 1905 – 3 November 1962) was a Scottish professional football winger who played for Aberdeen, Aldershot and Montrose.

Love began his senior career at Aberdeen in 1925, signing from Kirkintilloch Rob Roy. He played 240 games for Aberdeen, before moving to Aldershot in 1935.

Love won three Scotland caps in 1931, scoring once against Switzerland.

== Career statistics ==
=== Club ===
Appearances and goals by club, season and competition
Club	Season	League			Scottish Cup		Total	
Club	Season	Division	Apps	Goals	Apps	Goals	Apps	Goals
Aberdeen	1925–26	Scottish Division One	3	0	0	0	3	0
Aberdeen	1926–27	Scottish Division One	8	2	3	0	11	2
Aberdeen	1927–28	Scottish Division One	30	10	1	0	31	10
Aberdeen	1928–29	Scottish Division One	30	14	4	0	34	14
Aberdeen	1929–30	Scottish Division One	33	17	3	1	36	18
Aberdeen	1930–31	Scottish Division One	37	8	6	2	43	10
Aberdeen	1931–32	Scottish Division One	34	12	1	0	35	12
Aberdeen	1932–33	Scottish Division One	25	13	1	0	26	13
Aberdeen	1933–34	Scottish Division One	16	3	3	1	19	4
Aberdeen	Total		216	79	22	4	238	83

=== International ===
Appearances and goals by national team and year
National team	Year	Apps	Goals
Scotland	1931	3	1
Total		3	1

=== International goals ===
Scores and results list Scotland's goal tally first, score column indicates score after each Love goal

List of international goals scored by Andy Love
No.	Date	Venue	Opponent	Score	Result	Competition
1	24 May 1931	Stade Des Charmilles, Geneva	Switzerland	3–2	3–2	Friendly match
