= Davie Main =

Scottish footballer

Personal information
- Full name: David Main
- Date of birth: 19 August 1888
- Place of birth: Falkirk, Scotland
- Date of death: 23rd August 1961 (Aged 73)
- Place of death: Falkirk, Scotland
- Height: 5 ft 10 in (1.78 m)
- Position: Forward

Senior career*
| Years | Team | Apps | (Gls) |
| 1909–1910 | Falkirk | ?? | (??) |
| 1910–1911 | Sunderland | 2 | (0) |
| 1911–1917 | Aberdeen | 155 | (54) |
| 1917–19?? | Falkirk | ?? | (??) |
| Total | | 157+ | (54+) |
- * Club domestic league appearances and goals

David Main (1888–1961) was a Scottish professional footballer who played as a forward for Sunderland.

== Career statistics ==
=== Appearances and goals by club, season and competition ===
| Club | Season | League | | | National Cup | | Total | |
| Club | Season | Division | Apps | Goals | Apps | Goals | Apps | Goals |
|---|---|---|---|---|---|---|---|---|
| Falkirk | 1909-10 | Scottish Division One | - | - | - | - | - | - |
| Falkirk | Total | | - | - | - | - | - | - |
| Sunderland | 1910-11 | First Division | 2 | 0 | 0 | 0 | 2 | 0 |
| Sunderland | Total | | 2 | 0 | 0 | 0 | 2 | 0 |
| Aberdeen | 1910-11 | Scottish Division One | 0 | 0 | 0 | 0 | 0 | 0 |
| Aberdeen | 1911-12 | Scottish Division One | 26 | 11 | 5 | 2 | 31 | 13 |
| Aberdeen | 1912-13 | Scottish Division One | 26 | 10 | 1 | 0 | 27 | 10 |
| Aberdeen | 1913-14 | Scottish Division One | 30 | 9 | 2 | 2 | 32 | 11 |
| Aberdeen | 1914-15 | Scottish Division One | 24 | 5 | - | - | 24 | 5 |
| Aberdeen | 1915-16 | Scottish Division One | 32 | 15 | - | - | 32 | 15 |
| Aberdeen | 1916-17 | Scottish Division One | 17 | 4 | - | - | 17 | 4 |
| Aberdeen | Total | | 155 | 54 | 8 | 4 | 163 | 58 |
| Falkirk | 1917-?? | Scottish Division One | - | - | - | - | - | - |
| Falkirk | Total | | - | - | - | - | - | - |
| Career total | | | 157+ | 54+ | 8+ | 4+ | 165+ | 58+ |
