= Mike Cosgrove (footballer) =

Scottish footballer

Personal information
- Full name: Michael Docherty Cosgrove
- Date of birth: 20 May 1901
- Place of birth: Dundee, Scotland
- Date of death: December 1972 (aged 71)
- Place of death: Erie County, New York, USA
- Height: 5 ft 10 1/2 in (1.79 m)
- Positions: Wing half; inside right

Youth career
- Dundee North End

Senior career*
Years	Team	Apps	(Gls)
1920–1921	Dundee Hibernian		
1921–1923	Tottenham Hotspur		
1923	Celtic	0	(0)
1923–1924	Brooklyn Wanderers	24	(9)
1924–1928	Aberdeen	66	(5)
1928–	Bristol Rovers		
- * Club domestic league appearances and goals

Michael Cosgrove was a Scottish footballer who played in Scotland, England and the United States.

== Career ==
In January 1920, Cosgrove signed for Dundee Hibernian from local junior club Dundee North End. In May 1921, he moved to Tottenham Hotspur On 15 February 1923, Cosgrove joined Celtic but did not enter a first-team game. That summer, he moved to the United States and signed with the Brooklyn Wanderers of the American Soccer League. He began the 1924–1925 season with Brooklyn, played one game, then returned to Scotland where he joined Aberdeen F.C. Over four seasons, he played seventy-three games (sixty-five league games), scoring five league goals. In May 1928, Aberdeen sent him to Bristol Rovers F.C. When he retired, he returned to Scotland until 1930 when he moved his wife and family to the United States, becoming an American citizen in 1937.
