= Alec Reid (footballer) =

Scottish footballer

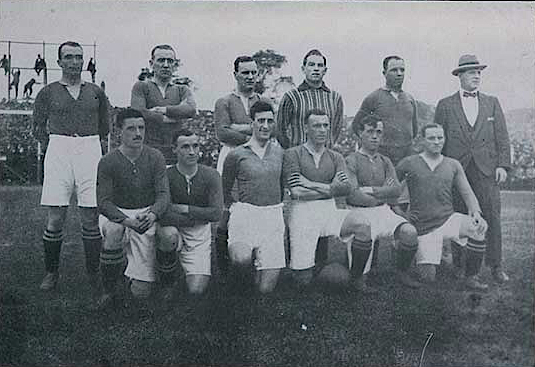
- Third Lanark team during 1923 tour – Reid standing, second from left

Personal information
- Full name: Alexander Laing Reid
- Date of birth: 9 February 1897
- Place of birth: West Calder, Scotland
- Date of death: 3 November 1969 (aged 72)
- Place of death: Preston, England
- Height: 5 ft 6 in (1.68 m)
- Position: Outside right

Senior career*
Years	Team	Apps	(Gls)
–	Ashfield		
1918–1920	Airdrieonians	69	(22)
1920–1925	Third Lanark	162	(44)
1925–1927	Aberdeen	68	(21)
1927–1933	Preston North End	193	(50)
1933	Blackpool	13	(1)
1933–1934	Chorley		
1934–1935	Darwen		
- * Club domestic league appearances and goals

Alexander Laing Reid (9 February 1897 – 3 November 1969) was a Scottish footballer who played as an outside right for teams including Airdrieonians, Third Lanark, Aberdeen and Preston North End.

He was Aberdeen's record signing when he joined in 1925, the club having money to spend from the recent sale of Alex Jackson whilst his previous employers had just been relegated.

At representative level, Reid took part in the Home Scots v Anglo-Scots trial and was subsequently selected as a reserve for the Scotland v England international fixture, and was selected for the Glasgow FA's annual challenge match against Sheffield, all taking place in 1922 while he was playing for Third Lanark, but this never led to a full cap. He also joined the club's tour of South America in the summer of 1923, scoring against the Argentina national team.
