= Sam Spencer =

English footballer

Personal information
- Full name: Samuel Spencer
- Date of birth: 18 January 1902
- Place of birth: Middlesbrough, England
- Date of death: 1987 (aged 84–85)
- Height: 5 ft 10 1/2 in (1.79 m)
- Position: Winger

Senior career*
Years	Team	Apps	(Gls)
- Oakhill
1921–1922	Stoke	1	(0)
1923–1924	New Brighton	8	(0)
- Mid Rhondda
- Aberdeen
1928	Bristol Rovers	2	(0)
- Newry Town
1929–1930	Port Vale	0	(0)
1930–1931	New Brighton	8	(0)
- Winsford United
Total		19	(0)
- * Club domestic league appearances and goals

Samuel Spencer (18 January 1902 – 1987) was an English footballer who played in the English Football League for Bristol Rovers, New Brighton and Stoke.

== Career ==
Spencer was born in Middlesbrough and joined Stoke in September 1921 from amateur side Oakhill. He played once for Stoke in the 1921–22 season, in a 1–0 win against Coventry City on 11 March 1922. He left the Victoria Ground at the end of the season. He went and joined New Brighton. Spencer then went on to play for Mid Rhondda, Aberdeen, Bristol Rovers, Port Vale and Winsford United whilst he also had a second spell with New Brighton.

== Career statistics ==
Appearances and goals by club, season and competition
Club	Season	League			FA Cup		Other		Total	
Club	Season	Division	Apps	Goals	Apps	Goals	Apps	Goals	Apps	Goals
Stoke	1921–22	Second Division	1	0	0	0	0	0	1	0
New Brighton	1923–24	Third Division North	3	0	0	0	0	0	3	0
New Brighton	1924–25	Third Division North	5	0	0	0	0	0	5	0
New Brighton	Total		8	0	0	0	0	0	8	0
Bristol Rovers	1928–29	Third Division South	2	0	0	0	0	0	2	0
Port Vale	1929–30	Third Division North	0	0	0	0	0	0	0	0
New Brighton	1931–32	Third Division North	8	0	0	0	0	0	8	0
