= Percy Dickie =

Scottish footballer

Personal information
- Full name: Percy Dickie
- Date of birth: 11 December 1907
- Place of birth: Aberdeen, Scotland
- Date of death: 1987 (aged 79–80)
- Place of death: Bucksburn, Scotland
- Positions: Inside forward; left half

Youth career
- Sunnybank School

Senior career*
Years	Team	Apps	(Gls)
1927–1929	Mugiemoss		
1929–1932	Aberdeen	33	(3)
1932–1937	St Johnstone	143	(15)
1937–1945	Blackburn Rovers	19	(1)
1945–1946	Buckie Thistle		
1946–1948	Peterhead		
- * Club domestic league appearances and goals

Percy Dickie (11 December 1907 – 1987) was a Scottish footballer who played as an inside forward or left half.

He began his senior career at hometown club Aberdeen in 1929 but was unable to establish himself as a regular, and after starting a fourth season in a backup role at Pittodrie he moved on to fellow top-tier club St Johnstone, helping them to finish high up the table (under manager Tommy Muirhead the Perth side finished fifth in both 1932–33 and 1934–35). His performances drew the attention of English clubs and he signed for Blackburn Rovers in September 1937 for a £1,200 transfer fee.

Never a frequent goalscorer playing as a forward, he was deployed in a more defensive role at Ewood Park, where he spent two 'regular' seasons – he was part of the squad which gained promotion as winners of the 1938–39 Second Division title, though interrupted by injuries – prior to the outbreak of World War II. During the conflict he was a Physical Training Instructor in the British Army and made appearances for the likes of Blackburn, Aberdeen, Clachnacuddin and St Mirren in unofficial competitions. He never played at the professional level again but featured in the Highland Football League and later had a coaching role at Aberdeen where he also ran a business.
