= Doug Livingstone =

Scottish footballer and manager

- Douglas as manager of Belgium in 1953

Personal information
- Full name: Dugald Livingstone
- Date of birth: 25 February 1898
- Place of birth: Alexandria, Scotland
- Date of death: 15 January 1981 (aged 82)
- Place of death: Marlow, England
- Height: 5 ft 9 in (1.75 m)
- Position: Full-back

Youth career
- Parkhead
- Ashfield

Senior career*
Years	Team	Apps	(Gls)
1917–1921	Celtic	47	
1918–1919	Dumbarton (loan)	1	
1921–1926	Everton	95	
1926	Plymouth Argyle	22	(0)
1927–1930	Aberdeen	75	(0)
1930–1933	Tranmere Rovers	88	(0)

Managerial career
- 1949–1950: Sparta Rotterdam
- 1951–1953: Republic of Ireland
- 1953–1954: Belgium
- 1954–1956: Newcastle United
- 1956–1958: Fulham
- 1958–1962: Chesterfield
- * Club domestic league appearances and goals

Dugald Livingstone (25 February 1898 – 15 January 1981) was a Scottish football player and manager.

He played fullback for Parkhead, Ashfield, Celtic, Dumbarton (loan), Everton, Plymouth Argyle, Aberdeen and Tranmere Rovers during his playing career before going into management.

Livingstone managed Dutch side Sparta Rotterdam between 1949 and 1950. During his managerial career, Livingstone took charge of the Republic of Ireland from 1951 to 1953, before managing Belgium, guiding them to the 1954 FIFA World Cup and notably was in charge for the thrilling 4–4 draw with England in the group stages.

After success with Belgium he moved on to manage Newcastle United in 1954. Some supporters and staff were at first concerned that his tactics were in total contrast to those of his predecessor George Martin, but these doubts were laid to rest when he guided the team to FA Cup victory in 1955. The Newcastle board had the final say in which players would be playing during his spell at the club and they notably played Jackie Milburn for this final, against Livingstone's wishes. Incidentally, Milburn scored in the match.

It was largely believed that Livingstone was unhappy with the amount of influence the board had on first team issues (although he never stated this). He left Newcastle in 1956 and went on to manage Fulham between 1956 and 1958 and then Chesterfield until 1962.

== Honours ==
Celtic

- Scottish League: 1918–19

Newcastle United

- FA Cup: 1954–55
