= Alex Merrie =

Scottish footballer (1905–1985)

Personal information
- Full name: Alexander Breckinridge Merrie
- Date of birth: 20 May 1905
- Place of birth: Saltcoats, Scotland
- Date of death: 1985 (aged 79–80)
- Position: Centre forward

Senior career*
Years	Team	Apps	(Gls)
1921–1922	Saltcoats Victoria		
1922–1923	Nithsdale Wanderers		
1923–1924	St Mirren		
1923	→ St Bernard's (loan)		
1923	→ St Johnstone (loan)		
1924	→ Alloa Athletic (loan)		
1924–1925	Stenhousemuir		
1925–1926	Portsmouth	7	(2)
1927	Nithsdale Wanderers		
1927–1930	Aberdeen		
1930–1933	Ayr United		
1933	Hull City	0	(0)
1933	Clyde		
1934–1935	Crewe Alexandra	32	(11)
1935	Brechin City		
1935	Aldershot	4	(2)
1935	Ross County		
1935	Exeter City	4	(2)
1935	Workington		
1936	Cork		
1936	Leith Athletic		
1936	Gloucester City		
1937	Evesham Town		
Total		47	(17)
- * Club domestic league appearances and goals

Alexander Breckinridge Merrie (20 May 1905 – 1985) was a Scottish footballer who played as a forward for 22 clubs.
