= 2013 in Canada =

- Decades: 1990s; 2000s; 2010s; 2020s
- See also: History of Canada; Timeline of Canadian history; List of years in Canada

Events from the year 2013 in Canada.

== Incumbents ==
=== Crown ===
- Monarch – Elizabeth II

=== Federal government ===
- Governor General – David Johnston
- Prime Minister – Stephen Harper
- Chief Justice – Beverley McLachlin (British Columbia)
- Parliament – 41st

=== Provincial governments ===
==== Lieutenant governors ====
- Lieutenant Governor of Alberta – Donald Ethell
- Lieutenant Governor of British Columbia – Judith Guichon
- Lieutenant Governor of Manitoba – Philip S. Lee
- Lieutenant Governor of New Brunswick – Graydon Nicholas
- Lieutenant Governor of Newfoundland and Labrador – John Crosbie (until March 19) then Frank Fagan
- Lieutenant Governor of Nova Scotia – John James Grant
- Lieutenant Governor of Ontario – David Onley
- Lieutenant Governor of Prince Edward Island – Frank Lewis
- Lieutenant Governor of Quebec – Pierre Duchesne
- Lieutenant Governor of Saskatchewan – Vaughn Solomon Schofield

==== Premiers ====
- Premier of Alberta – Alison Redford
- Premier of British Columbia – Christy Clark
- Premier of Manitoba – Greg Selinger
- Premier of New Brunswick – David Alward
- Premier of Newfoundland and Labrador – Kathy Dunderdale
- Premier of Nova Scotia – Darrell Dexter (until October 22) then Stephen McNeil
- Premier of Ontario – Dalton McGuinty (until February 11) then Kathleen Wynne
- Premier of Prince Edward Island – Robert Ghiz
- Premier of Quebec – Pauline Marois
- Premier of Saskatchewan – Brad Wall

=== Territorial governments ===
==== Commissioners ====
- Commissioner of Yukon – Doug Phillips
- Commissioner of Northwest Territories – George Tuccaro
- Commissioner of Nunavut – Edna Elias

==== Premiers ====
- Premier of the Northwest Territories – Bob McLeod
- Premier of Nunavut – Eva Aariak (until November 15) then Peter Taptuna
- Premier of Yukon – Darrell Pasloski

== Events ==
=== January to March ===
- January 1 – Quebec tax law changes from charging a 9.5% Quebec Sales Tax (QST) on a consumer sale plus the goods and services tax (GST), to a 9.975% QST on just the consumer sale, having no effect to the consumer, as the GST is 5%.
- January 21 – The Charbonneau Commission resumes its hearings.
- February 3 – The St. Albert cheese factory in eastern Ontario is ravaged by fire. There were no injuries and the Provincial Police leads to the survey.
- February 4 – The Royal Canadian Mint discontinues distribution of the penny.
- February 11
  - Hundreds of people demonstrated against the reform of the federal Employment Insurance in Tracadie-Sheila, New Brunswick.
  - Kathleen Wynne is sworn in as premier of Ontario, following a leadership election, becoming Ontario's first female premier and Canada's first openly gay premier; the election was also the first time that two women had competed for the leadership of the party, and the first time in Canadian history that six provinces or territories have simultaneously had female premiers.
- February 14 – Pastagate an incident that happens. it starts with an inspector of the Office québécois de la langue française (OQLF) sent a letter of warning to an upscale restaurant, Buonanotte, for using Italian words such as "pasta", "antipasti", "calamari", etc. on its menu instead of their French equivalents. The incident led to the resignation of Louise Marchand, head of the OQLF, on 8 March.
- February 27 – NDP MP of Jonquière—Alma, Claude Patry crosses the floor to the Bloc Québécois.
- February 28 – Seasonal workers protest against reform of federal Employment Insurance in Rivière-du-Loup, Quebec, while Prime Minister Stephen Harper made an appearance there to talk about the reform.
- March 13 – Chris Hadfield became the first Canadian to be the master on board the International Space Station (ISS), to the successor to the American NASA Kevin Ford.
- March 14 – Following controversy over campaign donations made during the 2011 election, Peter Penashue resigns as Minister of Intergovernmental Affairs and as MP for Labrador to contest the seat in a by-election.
- March 19 – Frank Fagan becomes Lieutenant Governor of Newfoundland and Labrador, replacing John Crosbie.
- March 21 – A massive pileup on Alberta Highway 2 during winter storm conditions injures approximately 100 people.

=== April to June ===
- April 4 to 13 – Suicide and funeral of Rehtaeh Parsons
- April 10 – Child killer Allyson McConnell is deported to Australia after serving just 15 months for killing her two young sons by drowning them. The leniency in sentencing provokes outrage, with Alberta Justice Minister Jonathan Denis appealing against the sentence and promising to seek her extradition.
- April 13 – The NDP leader Thomas Mulcair receives 92.3% vote of confidence in the national congress in Montreal.
- April 14 – Justin Trudeau is elected leader of the Liberal Party of Canada.
- April 19 – Opening of Musée Grévin Montreal
- April 26 – Edmonton Remand Centre workers walk off the job, starting a wildcat strike, in a dispute over safety deficiencies. Other union jail and court workers protested in support, in the following days.
- May 5 – The Canadian Forces Naval Jack is renamed the Canadian Naval Ensign, and it swaps roles with the National Flag on Her Majesty's Canadian ships
- May 13 – Liberal candidate Yvonne Jones wins the federal by-election in Labrador.
- May 14 – The British Columbia Liberal Party wins its fourth straight majority in the 2013 British Columbia election. The British Columbia New Democratic Party remains the official opposition, losing two seats, and the Green Party of British Columbia wins its first seat.
- June 2
  - A rail bridge crossing the Wanapitei River in the Sudbury neighbourhood of Wanup collapses, causing a train derailment and resulting in the temporary closure of Highway 537.
  - Denis Coderre resigns as MP for Bourassa to run for Mayor of Montreal.
- June 3 – The provincial government of Quebec places the city of Laval under trusteeship due to the ongoing crisis of corruption allegations against the city council at the Charbonneau Commission hearings. Florent Gagné, a former head of the Sûreté du Québec, will serve as the city's head trustee, with responsibility for reviewing and approving or rejecting all decisions made by city council.
- June 5 – Radio-Canada, the French-language arm of the Canadian Broadcasting Corporation, announces a plan to rebrand its broadcasting services as Ici.
- June 6
  - Edmonton—St. Albert MP Brent Rathgeber voluntarily leaves the Conservative caucus because of what he describes as "the Government's lack of commitment to transparency and open government", one day after tabling a bill on government transparency.
  - Edmonton East MP Peter Goldring rejoins the Conservative caucus after being acquitted of his 2011 charge of refusing to provide a breath sample at a traffic stop.
- June 11 – Quebec's premier Pauline Marois announced her support of the Quebec Soccer Federation's ban on turbans within the federation and suggested that the CSF has no authority over provincial organizations.
- June 17 – Following an investigation into allegations of municipal corruption at Quebec's Charbonneau Commission hearings, the provincial anti-corruption unit arrests and presses charges against three political figures in Montreal, including incumbent mayor Michael Applebaum, former city councillor Saulie Zajdel and a city bureaucrat.
- June 18 – After just seven months in office, Michael Applebaum resigns as Mayor of Montreal after his arrest on corruption charges.
- June 19–25 – Over 100,000 people in major centres in Southern Alberta are displaced due to catastrophic flooding.
- June 25 – Laurent Blanchard is selected as the new Mayor of Montreal in a vote at Montreal City Council.
- June 28 – After just seven months in office, Alexandre Duplessis resigns as mayor of Laval, Quebec, following allegations that he solicited prostitutes while in office.

=== July to September ===
- July 2 – The Royal Canadian Mounted Police Integrated National Security Enforcement Team-led Project Souvenir concludes with the arrests of Amanda Marie Korody and John Stewart Nuttall, both of Surrey, BC, on numerous terrorism-related criminal charges.
- July 3 – Martine Beaugrand is selected as the new mayor of Laval, Quebec, following the resignation of Alexandre Duplessis on June 28.
- July 6 – A 73-car freight train carrying crude oil derails in Lac-Mégantic, Quebec, catching fire and exploding, killing 47.
- July 8 – The Minister of Public Safety Vic Toews resigns as Minister and as MP for Provencher, citing a desire to spend more time with his family.
- July 31 – Former interim Liberal leader and Toronto Centre MP Bob Rae resigns to become First Nations negotiator in the Northern Ontario Ring of Fire mining development.
- August 3 – An African rock python snake escaped a pet store in Campbellton, New Brunswick, went through the HVAC system and eventually suffocated two children sleeping in an adjacent apartment.
- August 22 – For the second anniversary of his death, a bronze life-sized statue of Jack Layton on a tandem bike is unveiled at the Toronto Island ferry terminal in Toronto, simultaneously with the terminal being renamed "Jack Layton Ferry Terminal" in his honour.
- August 31
  - Merv Tweed resigns as MP for Brandon—Souris to become President of OmniTRAX Canada.
  - Jerry Dias is elected the first president of the new Unifor labour union, a merger between the Canadian Auto Workers and the Communications, Energy and Paperworkers Union of Canada.
- September 12 – Maria Mourani, Bloc Québécois MP for Ahuntsic, is expelled from caucus due to comments she made against the Quebec Charter of Values proposed by the Parti Québécois government of Pauline Marois.
- September 18 – Six people are killed in Ottawa in a collision between a Via Rail train and a double-decker OC Transpo bus.
- September 26 – Peterborough MP Dean Del Mastro leaves the Conservative caucus after being charged with breaking campaign rules during the 2008 election.

=== October to December ===
- October 8 – 2013 Nova Scotia general election. Nova Scotia elects a majority Liberal government led by Stephen McNeil. The Progressive Conservatives take second place to form the official opposition and the NDP are relegated to third party from a previous majority government.
- October 9 – Two personnel branches of the Canadian Armed Forces are renamed: Canadian Forces Medical Service to Royal Canadian Medical Service and Canadian Forces Dental Services to Royal Canadian Dental Corps.
- October 13 – Scott Jones, a gay resident of New Glasgow, Nova Scotia, is left paraplegic after being stabbed in an anti-gay attack.
- October 17 – The RCMP enforce an injunction in Rexton, New Brunswick, resulting in a violent confrontation at a blockade site protesting shale gas exploration. At least 40 people were arrested and five police cars caught fire.
- October 18 – The Government of Canada signs a tentative free trade agreement with the European Union.
- October 22 – Stephen McNeil is sworn in as premier of Nova Scotia, following a general election.
- October 28 – 2013 Nunavut general election
- November 5 – Senators Patrick Brazeau, Mike Duffy, and Pamela Wallin's salaries are suspended after accusations of inappropriate expense claims in the Senate expenses scandal.
- November 6 – Conservative MP Ted Menzies resigns as MP for Macleod.
- November 15 – The Legislative Assembly of Nunavut chooses Peter Taptuna as its premier.
- November 25 – Federal by-election in Bourassa, Brandon—Souris, Provencher and Toronto Centre
- November 30 – The oldest airfield in Canada, Edmonton City Centre (Blatchford Field) Airport, closes.
- December 13 – Thunder Bay—Superior North MP Bruce Hyer, who had left the NDP in 2012 to sit as an independent, joins the Green Party of Canada.
- December 20 – The Supreme Court of Canada unanimously strikes down prostitution-related laws.

== Sport ==
- January 6 – The 2012–13 NHL lockout ends, and the regular season starts January 19.
- January 13–20 – 2013 Canadian Figure Skating Championships – Mississauga, Ontario
- February 16–24 – 2013 Scotties Tournament of Hearts – Kingston, Ontario
- March 2–10 – 2013 Tim Hortons Brier – Edmonton, Alberta
- March 10–17 – 2013 World Figure Skating Championships – London, Ontario
- April 2–9 – 2013 IIHF Women's World Championship – Ottawa, Ontario
- May 6 – 2013 CFL draft
- May 26 – The Halifax Mooseheads win their first Memorial Cup by defeating the Portland Winterhawks 6 to 4. The tournament was played at the Credit Union Centre in Saskatoon
- June 9 – 2013 Canadian Grand Prix
- August 2–17 2013 Canada Summer Games – Sherbrooke, Quebec
- August 8–18 – 2013 Men's Pan American Cup, Brampton, Ontario
- August 10–18 – Canada at the 2013 World Championships in Athletics in Moscow, Russia
- November 23 - The Laval Rouge et Or win their eighth Memorial Cup by defeating the Calgary Dinos in the 49th Vanier Cup played at Telus-Université Laval Stadium in Quebec City
- November 24 – The Saskatchewan Roughriders win their fourth Grey Cup by defeating the Hamilton Tiger-Cats 45 to 23 in the 101st Grey Cup played at Mosaic Stadium at Taylor Field in Regina. Regina's own Chris Getzlaf was awarded the game's Most Valuable Canadian
- December 1–8 – 2013 Canadian Olympic Curling Trials – Winnipeg, Manitoba
- December 12 – 2013 CFL Expansion Draft, Ottawa, Ontario

== Deaths in 2013 ==
=== January ===
- January 2 – Wren Blair, 87, hockey coach and manager (Minnesota North Stars, Pittsburgh Penguins) (born 1925).
- January 3 – Ted Godwin, 79, artist (born 1933).
- January 4 – Murray Henderson, 91, hockey player (Boston Bruins) (born 1921).
- January 5
  - Joseph-Aurèle Plourde, 97, Roman Catholic prelate, Archbishop of Ottawa (1967–1989) (born 1915).
  - Claude Préfontaine, 79, actor (born 1933).
- January 6 – Dalia Wood, 88, senator (born 1924)
- January 7
  - Kent Abbott, 32, rock musician (Grade) (born 1980).
  - Louise Laurin, 77, educator and activist (born 1935).
- January 8 – Kenojuak Ashevak, 85, Inuk artist (born 1927).
- January 9 – John Wise, 77, politician, MP for Elgin (1972–1988); Minister of Agriculture (1979–1980; 1984–1988) (born 1935).
- January 10 – Daniel McCarthy, 86, television producer (The Friendly Giant, Mr. Dressup, Sesame Park) (born 1926).
- January 12
  - William Andrew MacKay, 83, academic, President of Dalhousie University (1980–1986) (born 1929).
  - Harold Crowchild, 97, Tsuu T'ina elder and soldier, last Treaty 7 World War II veteran (born 1915).
  - Chuck Dalton, 85, basketball player, member of Olympic team (1952) (born 1927).
- January 14 – Conrad Bain, 89, actor (Maude, Diff'rent Strokes) (born 1923).
- January 15
  - Maurice Camyré, 97, Olympic boxer (born 1915).
  - Robert Gordon Robertson, 95, civil servant and 7th Commissioner of the Northwest Territories (born 1917).
  - Yuli Turovsky, 73, Russian-born conductor and cellist (I Musici de Montréal Chamber Orchestra) (born 1929).
- January 16
  - Gerry Brisson, 75, professional ice hockey (born 1937)
  - Jake Froese, 87, former federal Member of Parliament for Niagara Falls and former Lord Mayor of Niagara-on-the-Lake
  - Kroum Pindoff, 97, Greek-born businessman and philanthropist (born 1915).
- January 19 – Harold Marshall, 94, military (born 1918)
- January 20
  - Richard Garneau, 82, sports journalist (born 1930).
  - John Melville Turner, 90, politician (born 1922).
- January 23
  - Lucien Paiement, 80, politician, Mayor of Laval (born 1932).
  - Susan Douglas Rubeš, 87, Austrian-born actress and producer (born 1925)
  - Frank Zakem, 82, politician and businessman (born 1931).
- January 24 – Jim Wallwork, 93, British-born World War II glider pilot (born 1919).
- January 25
  - Martial Asselin, 88, 25th Lieutenant Governor of Quebec (born 1924).
  - Normand Corbeil, 56, composer (Double Jeopardy, Extreme Ops, The Statement, V) (born 1956).
  - John Wood, 62, Olympic canoeist (born 1950).
- January 26 – Daurene Lewis, 68, politician, nation's first black female mayor (born 1943).
- January 27 – Gérard Dufresne, 95 or 94, politician and military officer (born 1918 or 1919)
- January 30 – Diane Marleau, 69, former Member of Parliament and cabinet minister (born 1943).

=== February ===
- February 2 – Jack Singer, 95, businessman and philanthropist (born 1917).
- February 4 – Achilla Orru, 53, Uganda-born blind musician (born 1950)
- February 6 – Arthé Guimond, 81, Roman Catholic prelate, Archbishop of Grouard-McLennan (2000–2006) (born 1931).
- February 9
  - Gérard Asselin, 62, politician and former MP for Charlevoix and Manicouagan (1993–2011) (born 1950).
  - Bill Irwin, 92, Olympic skier (born 1920).
- February 12 – Marion Bryden, 94, politician (born 1918).
- February 15 – John A. MacNaughton, 67, financier and executive, Hodgkin's lymphoma (born 1945).
- February 16 – Claudette Boyer, 75, politician, member of the Legislative Assembly of Ontario for Ottawa—Vanier (1999–2003), intercranial hemorrhage (born 1938).
- February 17 – André Gingras, 46, dancer and choreographer, cancer (born 1966).
- February 18 – Craig McKinley, 48, physician and aquanaut (NEEMO 7 mission) (born 1964).
- February 19
  - Eugene Whelan, 88, politician, MP for Essex South (1962–1968), for Essex (1968–1984), Senator for SW Ontario (1996–1999), stroke complications (born 1924).
  - Martin Wilk, 90, statistician (born 1922).
- February 20 – Jean Gauthier, 75, ice hockey player (Montreal Canadiens, Philadelphia Flyers, Boston Bruins) (born 1937).
- February 24
  - Roy Brown Jr., 96, car design engineer (Edsel, Ford Consul, Ford Cortina), complications of Parkinson's disease and pneumonia (born 1916).
  - John Driftmier, 30, television director, plane crash (born 1982).
  - Alexis Nihon II, 67, real estate businessman, Olympic wrestler for The Bahamas (1968), cancer (born 1946).
- February 25 – Herb Epp, 78, politician, MPP of the Ontario Legislature for Waterloo North (1977–1990) (born 1934).
- February 26
  - James Ferguson, 86, politician (born 1925).
  - William Perehudoff, 94, painter (born 1919).
- February 27 – Doreen Kimura, 79 or 80, psychologist who was professor at Simon Fraser University (born 1933)

=== March ===
- March 3
  - Nick Ternette, German-born politician and political activist (born 1945)
  - George Wearring, 84, basketball player (born 1928)
- March 4 – Michael D. Moore, 98, film director, second unit director and silent-era child actor, heart failure (born 1914).
- March 5 – Toren Smith, 52, manga publisher and translator (born 1960).
- March 6
  - Stompin' Tom Connors, 77, country singer-songwriter (born 1936).
  - Alan Pfeifer, 86, American-born CFL football player (Toronto Argonauts) (born 1927).
- March 7
  - Max Ferguson, 89, radio broadcaster (born 1924).
  - Elmar Tampõld, 92, Estonian architect (born 1920)
- March 9 – Aasia Begum, 61, Pakistani-born actress (born 1951)
- March 10 – Jim Anderson, 82, ice hockey player (Springfield Indians) and coach (Washington Capitals) (born 1930).
- March 11 – Doug Christie, 66, lawyer and free speech activist, liver cancer (born 1946).
- March 14 –
  - Walter Buck, 82, politician, Alberta MLA for Clover Bar (1967–1989), stomach cancer (born 1921).
  - Paul Rose, 69, political figure, leader of PDS (1996–2002), convicted kidnapper and murderer (October Crisis), stroke (born 1943).
- March 15 – Shannon Larratt, 39, editor and publisher (BMEzine) (born 1973).
- March 17 – Jean-Noël Lavoie, 85, politician (born 1927).
- March 18 – Frank D. Selke, Jr., 83, ice hockey executive (Montreal Canadiens, California Golden Seals) (born 1930).
- March 19 – Larry Gordon, 74, ice hockey general manager (Edmonton Oilers) (born 1939).
- March 21 – Yvan Ducharme, 75, humorist and actor, COPD (born 1937).
- March 23 – Joe Weider, 93, bodybuilder and publisher, co-founder of the International Federation of BodyBuilders, founder of Muscle & Fitness, heart ailment (born 1919).

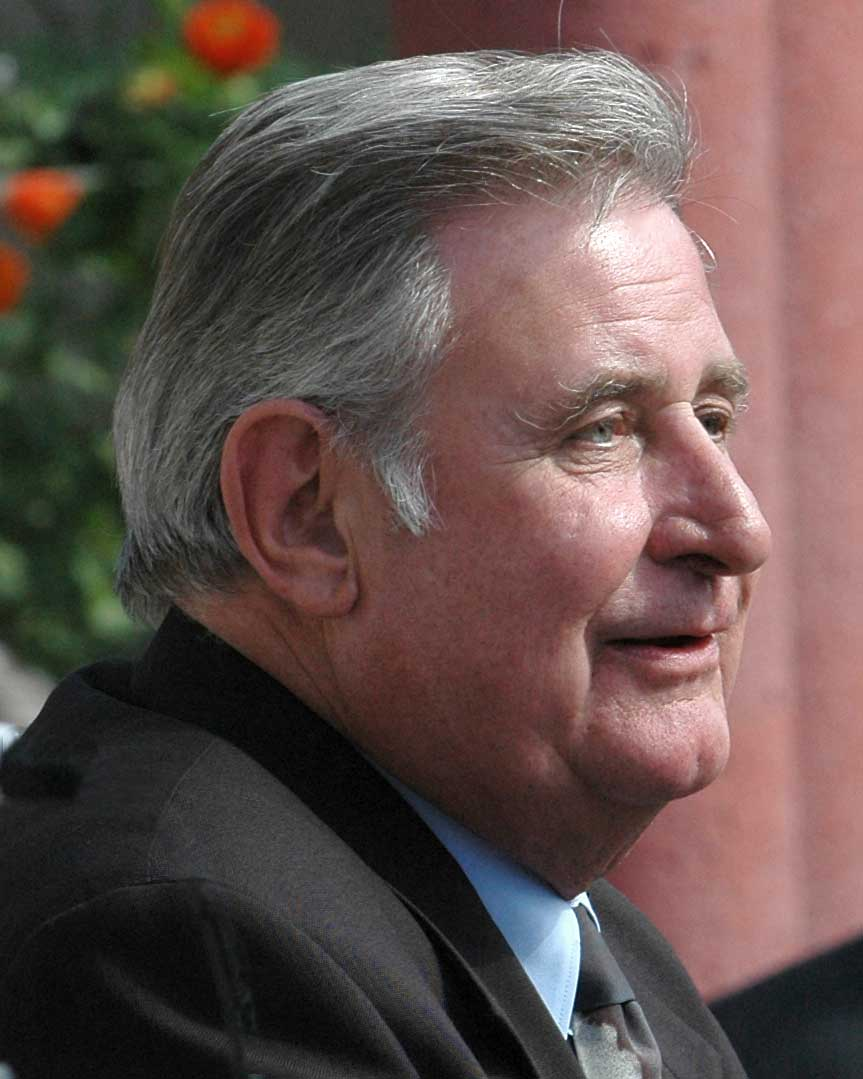
Ralph Klein

- March 26
  - Léonce Bernard, 69, 26th Lieutenant Governor of Prince Edward Island and the third Island Acadian to hold this position (born 1943).
  - Wayne Fleming, 62, ice hockey coach, brain cancer (born 1950).
- March 27
  - Yvonne Brill, 88, aerospace engineer (NASA), National Medal of Technology and Innovation (2011), complications from breast cancer (born 1924).
  - Alfredo De Gasperis, 79, Italian-born developer, and contractor (born 1934)
- March 29
  - Brian Huggins, 81, British-born journalist and actor (Trailer Park Boys) (born 1931).
  - Ralph Klein, 70, politician, 12th Premier of Alberta (1992–2006), MLA for Calgary-Elbow (1989–2007), COPD and dementia (born 1942).
  - Art Phillips, 82, politician, MP for Vancouver Centre (1979–1980), Mayor of Vancouver, British Columbia (1973–1977) (born 1930).
- March 30 – Peter Kormos, 60, former Ontario MPP for Niagara Centre and Welland (born 1952).

=== April ===
- April 1
  - Marjorie Anthony Linden, 77, television producer and media executive (born 1935).
  - Kildare Dobbs, 89, Indian-born short story and travel writer, multiple organ failure (born 1923).
- April 3
  - Robert Elgie, 84, politician, MPP for York East (1977–1985), heart failure (born 1929).
  - Graham Lea, 79, broadcaster and politician, British Columbia MLA for Prince Rupert (1972–1984) (born 1934).
- April 4
  - Fergy Brown, 90, Scottish-born politician, Mayor of York (1988–1994) (born 1923).
- April 6 – Johnny Esaw, 87, sports broadcaster, pulmonary failure (born 1925).
- April 8
  - Greg Kramer, 51, British-born writer (born 1961).
  - Ronald Osborne, 66, British-born businessman, Chairman of Postmedia Network (since 2010), Sun Life Financial (2005–2010), CEO of Maclean-Hunter (1986–1994) (born 1947).

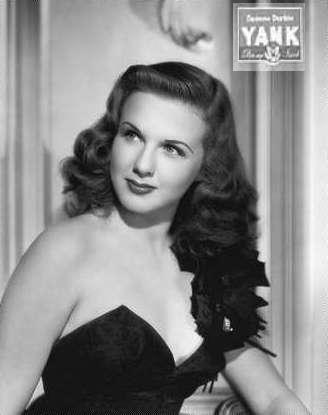
Deanna Durbin on the cover of Yank Magazine, January 1945

- April 10 – George Hunter, 92, documentary photographer (born 1921).
- April 11 – Shorty Jenkins, 77, curling icemaker (born 1935).
- April 13 – Edwin G. Pulleyblank, 90, sinologist and linguist (born 1922).
- April 14 – A. S. A. Harrison, 65, writer and artist, cancer (born 1947).
- April 15 – Richard Collins, 66, actor (Trailer Park Boys), heart attack (born 1947).
- April 16
  - Pentti Lund, 87, Finnish-born ice hockey player, after short illness (born 1925).
  - Rita MacNeil, 68, country and folk singer (born 1944)
  - George Beverly Shea, 104, gospel music singer, after brief illness (born 1909).
- April 17 – Deanna Durbin, singer and actress (born 1921)
- April 21
  - Gerard Amerongen, 98, politician and lawyer (born 1914).
  - Morley Byron Bursey, 101, diplomat (born 1912)
- April 22 – Clément Marchand, 100, poet and journalist (born 1912).
- April 23 – Lawrence Morley, 93, geophysicist (born 1920).
- April 29 – Mike McMahon, Jr., 71, ice hockey player (born 1941).
- April 30 – Shirley Firth, 59, Gwich'in Olympic skier (1972, 1976, 1980, 1984) (born 1953).

=== May ===
- May 1 – Martin Kevan, 66, Kenyan-born film and voice actor (Far Cry 3) and author, cancer (born 1957).
- May 2
  - Roddy Blackjack, 86, Little Salmon/Carmacks First Nation elder and chief, architect of Yukon Land Claims agreement (born 1927). (death announced on this date)
  - Boris Elik, 83, ice hockey player (born 1929).
- May 5 – Greg Quill, 66, Australian-born roots musician and entertainment critic (Toronto Star) (born 1947).
- May 6
  - Michelangelo Spensieri, 64, Italian-born politician and lawyer (born 1949).
  - Tim Bosma, 32, murder victim (born 1980)
- May 7 – Mairuth Sarsfield, 88, broadcaster and author (No Crystal Stair) (born 1925).
- May 8 – Bill Langstroth, 81, country music producer (Singalong Jubilee), inducted into Canadian Country Music Hall of Fame (2011) (born 1932).
- May 9 – Huguette Oligny, 91, theatre actress (born 1922).
- May 11 – Doug Finley, 66, politician, Senator for Ontario (since 2009), Campaign Director during the 2006 and 2008 elections, colorectal cancer (born 1946).
- May 12 – Peter Worthington, 86, journalist (Toronto Telegram) and editor-in-chief (Toronto Sun) (born 1927).
- May 13 – Lynne Woolstencroft, 69, former mayor of Waterloo, Ontario (born 1943)
- May 14
  - Ray Guy, 74, humorist, writer and journalist, cancer (born 1939).
  - Dave Lyon, 74, Olympic track and field coach (1984, 1988, 1992, 2000) (born 1938).
- May 16
  - Geoffrey Gowan, 83, British-born sports broadcaster (CBC) and sport executive (CAC), Parkinson's disease (born 1929).
  - Bryan Illerbrun, 56, football player (Saskatchewan Roughriders) (born 1957).
  - Nora McDermott, 85, basketball player, volleyball player, coach and physical education teacher
- May 17 – Elijah Harper, 64, Cree politician and band chief, Manitoba MLA for Rupertsland (1981–1992); MP for Churchill (1993–1997), heart failure (born 1949).
- May 19
  - Robin Harrison, 80, English-born pianist and composer, heart attack (born 1932).
  - Neil Reynolds, 72, newspaper editor (The Ottawa Citizen), cancer (born 1940).
- May 20 – Billy Dawe, 88, ice hockey player (born 1924)
- May 23 – Epy Guerrero, 71, Dominican-born Major League Baseball scout (Toronto Blue Jays)(born 1942).
- May 29
  - Henry Morgentaler, 90, Polish-born physician, abortion advocate, Holocaust survivor, heart attack (born 1923).
  - William Earl Reid, 78, politician, British Columbia MLA for Surrey (1983–1986) and Surrey-White Rock-Cloverdale (1986–1991), cancer (born 1934).

=== June ===
- June 1
  - Frank Dempsey, 88, American-born football player (born 1925).
  - James Kelleher, 82, politician, MP for Sault Ste. Marie (1984–1988), member of Senate of Canada (1990–2005), heart failure (born 1930).
  - Ian P. Howard, 85, psychologist and researcher in visual perception (born 1927)
  - Jane Purves, 63, politician and newspaper editor (Halifax Chronicle Herald), Nova Scotia MLA for Halifax Citadel (1999–2003), cancer (born 1950 or 1949).
- June 2
  - Mario Bernardi, 82, conductor and composer (born 1930)
  - Marco Frascari, 68, Italian-born architect (born 1945).
- June 3
  - Howard Grief, 60, lawyer (born 1940)
  - Chris Levoir, 31, musician (The Mark Inside) (born 1982 or 1981).
- June 4 – Gaston Isabelle, 92, politician, MP for Hull electoral district (1979–1984) (born 1920)
- June 8
  - Paul Cellucci, 65, American-born politician and diplomat, Ambassador to Canada (2001–2005), amyotrophic lateral sclerosis (born 1948).
  - Kyle Miller, 31, lacrosse player, cancer (born 1981).
  - Philip White, 90, mayor of the borough of York, Ontario (1970–1978) (born 1923)
- June 12 – Laslo Babits, 55, Olympic javelin thrower (1984) (born 1958).
- June 14 – Rod Bushie, 60, Anishinaabe elder, Grand Chief of Assembly of Manitoba Chiefs (1997–2000), lung cancer (born 1953).
- June 16 – D. M. Schurman, 88, historian (born 1924).
- June 17 – Pierre F. Côté, 85, civil servant, Chief Electoral Officer of Quebec (1978–1997) (born 1927).
- June 18
  - Vernon Fougère, 70, Roman Catholic prelate, Bishop of Charlottetown (1991–2009) (born 1943).
  - Garde Gardom, 88, politician, British Columbia MLA for Vancouver-Point Grey (1966–1986), Lieutenant-Governor of British Columbia (1995–2001) (born 1924).
  - Brian P. Goodman, civil servant, Chair of the Immigration and Refugee Board of Canada.
- June 24 – Andy Scott, 58, former federal Member of Parliament (born 1955)
- June 29 – Jack Gotta, 83, American-born CFL and WFL football player, coach and general manager (Calgary Stampeders, Saskatchewan Roughriders, Birmingham Americans) (born 1929).

=== July ===
- July 2
  - Armand Gaudreault, 91, ice hockey player (Boston Bruins) (born 1921).
  - Paul Lorieau, 71, national anthem singer (Edmonton Oilers) and optometrist, cancer (born 1942).
- July 3 – Peter Torokvei, 62, actor, producer and screenwriter (born 1951).
- July 4 – Tony Licari, 92, ice hockey player (born 1921).
- July 5
  - James McCoubrey, 111, supercentenarian (born 1901)
  - Daniel Wegner, 65, social psychologist (born 1948)
- July 9 – Gaétan Soucy, 54, novelist, heart attack (born 1958).
- July 13 – Cory Monteith, 31, actor (born 1982)
- July 16 – Alex Colville, 92, artist (born 1920)
- July 18 – Peter Appleyard, 84, British-born jazz musician and composer, natural causes (born 1918).
- July 19
  - Paul Côté, 69, Olympic sailor (1972) (born 1944).
  - Newton Tattrie, 82, professional wrestler (born 1931).
- July 20 – Augustus Rowe, 92, physician and politician, Newfoundland and Labrador MLA for Carbonear (1971–1975), Health Minister (1972–1975). (born 1920)
- July 25 – Nic Gotham, 53, jazz saxophonist and composer (Nigredo Hotel).
- July 27 – Sammy Yatim, 18, murder victim (born 1995)
- July 29
  - William F. Bell, 74, politician, mayor of Richmond Hill, Ontario (1988–2006) (born 1939).
  - Rocky Jones, 71, social activist, heart attack (born 1941).
- July 30
  - Harry Smith, 94, American-born football player (Detroit Lions) and coach (Saskatchewan Roughriders) (born 1918).
  - Irene Uchida, 96, scientist and Down syndrome researcher (born 1917).

=== August ===
- August 4 – Charles-Omer Valois, 89, Roman Catholic prelate, Bishop of Saint-Jérôme (1977–1997) (born 1924).
- August 5
  - Shawn Burr, 47, ice hockey player (Detroit Red Wings, Tampa Bay Lightning, San Jose Sharks), complications from fall (born 1966).
  - Willie Dunn, 71, Mi'kmaq folk singer, film maker, songwriter and First Nations activist (born 1942).
- August 7
  - Paul Mercier, 89, politician, MP for Blainville—Deux-Montagnes (1993–1997) and Terrebonne—Blainville (1997–2000) (born 1924).
  - Anthony Pawson, 60, British-born genetic researcher, expert in cell communication (born 1952).
- August 8 – Les Ascott, 91, football player (Toronto Argonauts) (born 1921).
- August 10 – Haji, 67, actress (Faster, Pussycat! Kill! Kill!) (born 1946).
- August 13 – Paul O'Neill, 84, actor, writer, historian and broadcaster (CBC) (born 1928).
- August 15 –
  - August Schellenberg, 77, actor (born 1936)
  - Robert R. Taylor, 73, wildlife photographer, cancer (born 1940).
- August 16 – Roy Bonisteel, 83, journalist (born 1930)
- August 23 – Red Burns, 88, academic (born 1925).

=== September ===
- September 4
  - Jules Paivio, 97, cartographer and teacher, last surviving Canadian veteran of the Spanish Civil War (born 1915).
  - Michel Pagé, 63, politician (born 1949).
- September 7 – Barry Smith, 58, ice hockey player (Boston Bruins) (born 1955).
- September 8 – Don Reichert, 81, artist (born 1932).
- September 10
  - Glen Skov, 82, ice hockey player (Detroit Red Wings) (born 1931).
  - Jack Vance, 80, army general (born 1933).
- September 13 – Jimmy Herman, 72, actor (Dances with Wolves, North of 60) (born 1940).
- September 14 – Phil A. Iafrati, 66, English–born Canadian soccer coach, multiple myeloma (born 1947).
- September 16 – Howard Sheppard, 79, politician (born 1933).
- September 17 – Larry Lake, 70, American–born broadcaster and musician (born 1943).
- September 18
  - Arthur Lamothe, 84, French–born film director and producer (born 1928).
  - Donald Low, 68, microbiologist, key figure in Toronto SARS outbreak, brain cancer (born 1945).
- September 20 – Jim Charlton, 102, coin dealer and numismatic publisher (born 1911).
- September 21 – Michel Brault, 85, film director (born 1928).
- September 22
  - David H. Hubel, 87, neurologist, laureate of the Nobel Prize in Physiology or Medicine (1981) (born 1926).
  - Dave Nichol, 73, Loblaws product marketer (born 1940)
  - Howard Riopelle, 91, ice hockey player (born 1922).
- September 25 – Bennet Wong, 83, psychiatrist (born 1930).
- September 26 – Denis Brodeur, 82, Olympic bronze-medalist ice hockey player (1956) and photographer (born 1930).
- September 29 – Roy Peterson, 77, editorial cartoonist (born 1936).

=== October ===
- October 5 – Fred Mifflin, 75, politician and naval officer, MP for Bonavista—Trinity—Conception (1988–2000) (born 1938.
- October 6 – Ulysses Curtis, 87, American-born CFL football player (Toronto Argonauts) (born 1926).
- October 8
  - Paul Desmarais, 86, businessman (born 1927).
  - Metro Prystai, 85, ice hockey player, triple Stanley Cup winner (1952, 1954, 1955) (born 1927).
- October 12 – Michelle Madoff, 85, politician, member of the Pittsburgh City Council (1978–1993) (born 1928).
- October 16 – Bruno Bonamigo, 48, television director (Le Téléjournal Grand Montréal), amyotrophic lateral sclerosis (born 1965).
- October 17
  - Arthur Maxwell House, 87, politician, lieutenant-governor of Newfoundland and Labrador (1997–2002) (born 1926).
  - Rene Simpson, 47, former professional tennis player, brain cancer (born 1966).
- October 18 – Allan Stanley, 87, Hall of Fame ice hockey player (born 1926).
- October 25 – Paul Reichmann, 83, Austria-born businessman and real estate mogul (Olympia and York) (born 1930).
- October 30 – Leo Gravelle, 88, ice hockey player (born 1925).
- October 31 – Murray Cardiff, 79, politician (born 1934).

=== November ===
- November 1 – Eugène Rhéaume, 80, politician, MP for Northwest Territories (1963–1965) (born 1932).
- November 4
  - Betty Hill, 76, politician (born 1937).
  - Ray Willsey, 85, football player and coach (born 1928).
- November 11 – William Fyfe, 86, New Zealand-born geologist (born 1927).
- November 12 – Steve Rexe, 66, ice hockey player (born 1947).
- November 14 – Reg Sinclair, 88, ice hockey player (New York Rangers, Detroit Red Wings) (born 1925).
- November 16 – William McDonough Kelly, 88, politician, Senator (1982–2000 (born 1925).
- November 18 – Peter Wintonick, 60, documentary filmmaker, cholangiocarcinoma (born 1953).
- November 20 – Hellmuth Wolff, 76, Swiss–born organ builder (born 1937).
- November 21 – Maurice Vachon, 84, professional wrestler, best known by his ring name "Mad Dog" Vachon. (1950–1986) (born 1929).
- November 23 – Connie Broden, 81, ice hockey player (Montreal Canadiens) (born 1932).
- November 24 – Lou Hyndman, 78, politician, Alberta provincial minister (born 1935).

=== December ===
- December 5 – John Alan Lee, sociologist
- December 29 or December 30 – Christopher Peloso, husband of former Ontario deputy premier George Smitherman found dead
- December 31 – Jim Coutts, political advisor

== See also ==
- 2013 in Canadian music
- 2013 in Canadian television
- List of Canadian films of 2013
