= Faye Leung (businesswoman) =

Canadian businesswoman (1932–2024)

- Born: Leong Fuey Chell; 27 May 1932; Victoria, British Columbia, Canada
- Died: 1 November 2024 (aged 92); Vancouver, British Columbia, Canada
- Occupation: Businesswoman
- Spouse: Dean Leung

Faye Leung (born Leong Fuell Chew; 27 May 1932 – 1 November 2024) was a Canadian businesswoman, best known for her involvement in the scandal that brought down the British Columbia government of Bill Vander Zalm in 1991 surrounding the sale of Fantasy Gardens. Raised in Vancouver and Victoria Chinatowns, she and her husband Dean were credited with helping to "prevent the destruction of Chinatown when they opposed a freeway going through the historic district."

Faye Leung was born Leong Fuell Chew in Victoria, British Columbia on 27 May 1932.

Leung "brokered the deal in which Vander Zalm, while in office, sold Fantasy Gardens World" to Tan Yu. "That sale led to Vander Zalm's breach of trust criminal trial in 1992."

The "ever-colourful" Leung was noted for "a wardrobe containing several hundred flamboyant hats and a habit of delivering high-speed, high-pitched, high-volume monologues." In her autobiography The Hat Lady Sings, she claimed that Vander Zalm still owed her 1.6 million dollars.

Leung died in Vancouver on 1 November 2024, at the age of 92. A book about Dean and Faye Leung, on which she collaborated with Christopher Best, was published in 2020.
