= At the Hotel =

Canadian television series

- Created by: Ken Finkleman
- Country of origin: Canada
- No. of episodes: 6

Production
- Running time: 42–45 minutes

Original release
- Network: CBC Television
- Release: March 7 – April 18, 2006

At the Hotel is a Canadian comedy drama-musical miniseries concerning the goings-on at an illustrious Montreal hotel, known for its favourable treatment of struggling artists. Created by Ken Finkleman and produced by One Hundred Percent Television, the series aired on CBC Television in 2006. The music was composed by Robert Carli. This is the only Ken Finkleman production in which he did not cast himself as a character. He does however make a very brief on-screen appearance as a member of the crew shooting a music video in the hotel.

== Background ==
At The Hotel is a six-episode miniseries created, co-written, and produced by Ken Finkleman, which aired on CBC Television in 2006. Like Finkleman's The Newsroom, the miniseries was notable for its use of surreal plot devices and unique use of music.

At first glance, the story appears to be a series of unconnected vignettes, woven against a mystery in the past which may be the reason behind a murder in the present day. Each episode opens with a short flashback to that critical night during a party back in 1961, during which a nameless chambermaid died. In the fifth episode, the audience discovers that everything they have just been told may lie solely in the imagination of a writer who is also a character in the miniseries. The end of the miniseries winds up the end of the novel, which pays for the writer's bar tab at the hotel; but the hotel hallways still have closed doors and the audience is left knowing nothing more about the hotel than when the miniseries began.

== Plot ==
A writer arrives at the Chateau Rousseau, an illustrious Montreal hotel known for its favourable treatment of struggling artists. He has been hired by Lucy Knowlton, the alcoholic owner of the hotel, to research and write a book about its history. She will comp his room and board until the book is written. At the same time, Jenny arrives at the hotel and is hired as a chambermaid.

While the writer researches the hotel's past, Jenny hears a gunshot at the hotel pool and arrives to find a body floating in the pool. She also finds herself face to face with the murder suspect, gun in hand; but she cannot identify him because she is near-sighted and can't see him clearly.

The death may be related to events in the past. It may also be related to an attempt by Jacob Knowlton to have his sister Lucy murdered, leaving him with sole ownership of the hotel. He plans to demolish it, partly to support his son's election campaign, but knows that his sister would never allow it. The body is that of Lucy and Jacob's old friend Peter Miflin, whose daughter was killed when Jacob's son got drunk and drove the car into a river. News of her death was hushed up.

In the meantime, guests come and go at the hotel, each with his or her own story like a cross-section of their lives. Some have affairs, one couple tries to sell a baby, there is even a case of spontaneous human combustion. A young girl whose mother dies at the hotel successfully covers up the death by hiring another guest as her "father." The chambermaids and bellhops also have complex relationship problems, which are made worse for Adelaide and Jeremy by Jeremy's constant scheming to turn an additional illicit buck at the expense of the guests. Jenny's uneasiness over what she has witnessed also factors into many of the vignettes.

In the fifth episode, it becomes apparent that many if not all of these stories are actually the novel the writer has written instead of the history he was supposed to write. The writer blames the closed doors of the hotel, which told him nothing, so he had to make things up. Lucy agrees to read the novel. If it is good enough, she will tear up his bar bill, which was not included under the terms of room and board.

With that, the story plunges back into other guest vignettes, while continuing to follow Jenny and the other hotel staff. The novel does not end with the operatic death and funeral of another guest, because the writer thinks that would be too maudlin. A formerly famous opera singer was overcome with emotion and died when a famed tenor came to serenade her. All the staff and guests at the hotel break into operatic song at her funeral.

Jenny has a knack for being in the right place at the right time. When one of the guests learns of his father's death over the telephone, she is present to console him. It turns out that the guest is now the King of Saudi Arabia, and she will become his queen.

It turns out that Jacob's son is not Jacob's son at all. Instead, he was secretly adopted by Jacob after he was born to Lucy out of wedlock to an unknown father. When the young man finds out, he rejects Jacob and his scheming. Jacob is ruthless and reveals the secret of the accident in revenge against his son's betrayal. Jacob's son saves himself from the disclosure by discovering Christianity. Jacob is arrested for his friend's death in the pool, but turns out to be innocent of that death. He was, however, the person at the 1961 party who killed the chambermaid.

The novel finally ends when Jacob is killed in the halls of the hotel he tried so hard to own. The story told by the miniseries ends when the writer receives an envelope with the torn-up bar bill inside. Lucy never tells him that she thinks the novel is rather bad. However, she has a soft spot for artists.

== List of episodes ==
- Episode 1 - "Welcome to the Rousseau"
- Episode 2 - "The Perfect Couple"
- Episode 3 - "I Fucked Lou Reed"
- Episode 4 - "Modern Solutions to Modern Problems"
- Episode 5 - "That's How You Wave a Towel"
- Episode 6 - "Doesn't Anyone Want to Ask Me About My Dress?"

== Cast and characters ==
Chateau Rousseau Staff

- Natalie Lisinska - Jenny
- Benz Antoine - Michael Quenton
- Carlo Rota – Albert
- Walter Alza – Slavic
- Brandon McGibbon – Jeremy
- Robin Brûlé – Adelaide
- Sarah Cornell – Irina
- Matthew Edison - Mr. Wolf
- Hrant Alianak - Zlawko
- Paulino Nunes – Milos
- Salvatore Antonio – Pablo
- Stephanie Morgenstern – Gerta
- Andrew Pifko – Pete
- Daniel Kash - Detective Goldberg
- Rosa Labordé – Carmelita

The Residents

- Martha Henry - Lucy Knowlton
- Samantha Weinstein – Piper
- Linda Kash – Folly
- Raoul Bhaneja - Harry Jindal
- Shawn Campbell - William, Harry's lawyer
- Sandra O'Neill - Mme Boratto
- Nigel Bennett- Jacob Knowlton
- Matthew Bennett - J.J. Knowlton
- Frank Moore - Frank Richards
- Peter MacNeill - Peter Miflin
- Jonas Chernick - Danny Book
- Neil Crone - Tom Deacon
- David Ferry - a political business associate in J.J.'s camp

The Guests

- Maury Chaykin - Jerry Mitchell
- Kathleen Laskey - Anne Silver, Jerry's former partner
- Don McKellar - Woody
- Tom McCamus - Bill DeJour
- Alberta Watson - Lucy's best friend, Camille
- Rosemary Dunsmore - Marcia Bridge
- Shawn Lawrence - David Bridge
- Geri Hall - Piper's concerned teacher, Miss Hudak
- David Keeley - musician Mark Wilson
- Frank Fontaine - Cardinal Facinelli
- Alvaro D'Antonio - Father Segundo, the Cardinal's assistant
- Danny Wells - Marty Kay
- Aron Tager - Norm Walsh, Marty's his long-suffering manager
- Camilla Scott - Rachel Osterman
- Susan Coyne - Donna, Piper's fundamentalist Christian aunt
- Rick Roberts - a nervous man having an affair
- Janine Theriault - the nervous woman having an affair with the nervous man
- Vince Carlin - funeral director
- Sam Kalilieh - a Saudi Prince
- Conrad Dunn - Senor Arioso, the psychic hypnotist
- Tommy Chang - Stevie Chang, a professional poker player
- Zoie Palmer & Cherion Drake - Sarah and Linda
- Mark Caven & Leni Parker - Mr. & Mrs. Fishman
- Karen Racicot & Philip Craig - the Zieglers
- Deborah Odell & Rod Wilson - a publisher and an architect
- Steven McCarthy - Danny Book's lover, Brian McDougal
- John Blackwood - Lucy's doctor

== Awards ==
Maury Chaykin, Gemini Award for best performance by an actor in a guest role ("The Perfect Couple")

== At the Hotel in other media ==
- A mock-up Chateau Rousseau website was launched, with links to staff resumes, J.J.'s fictitious blog, and publicity photos.

=== Soundtrack ===
- The show's main theme and incidental music were written by Robert Carli. The show also features some existing show-tune numbers, notably "Sue Me" from Guys and Dolls, and "Always True To You" from Kiss Me, Kate, and some opera arias. Toronto band The Mark Inside appears, uncredited, in an episode to shoot a video at the hotel.
