= Ernest Hall (British Columbia politician) =

Canadian politician

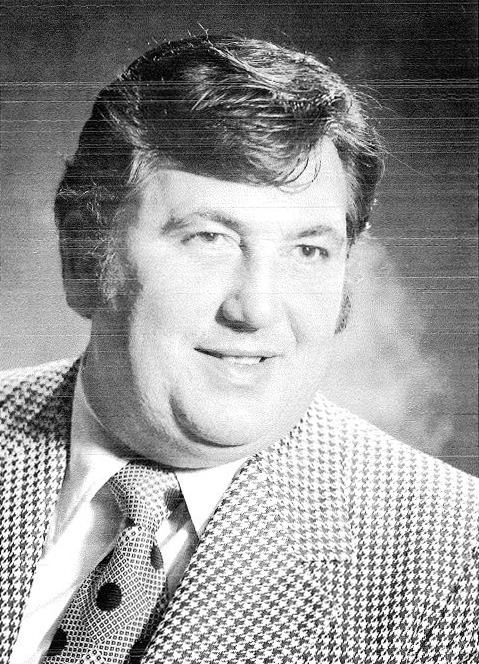
- Hall, c. 1970s

Member of the British Columbia Legislative Assembly for Surrey
- In office 10 May 1979 – 5 May 1983 Serving with Bill Vander Zalm
- Preceded by: Bill Vander Zalm
- Succeeded by: Rita Johnston; William Earl Reid
- In office 12 September 1966 – 11 December 1975
- Preceded by: Riding Established
- Succeeded by: Bill Vander Zalm

Personal details
- Born: 16 September 1929 Stretford, Lancashire, England
- Died: 25 January 1987 (aged 57) Delta, British Columbia
- Cause of death: Heart Attack
- Party: New Democrat
- Occupation: Legal Aid Services; Textile Wholesaler; Teacher

Ernest "Ernie" Hall (16 September 1929 – 25 January 1987) was an English-born merchant and political figure in British Columbia. He represented Surrey in the Legislative Assembly of British Columbia from 1966 to 1975 and from 1979 to 1983 as a New Democratic Party (NDP) member.

He was born in Manchester and worked briefly as a teacher before joining the British Army. Hall came to Canada in 1957 and worked as a textile wholesaler. He later worked for the Hudson's Bay Company wholesale division. In 1963, he was named provincial secretary for the NDP in British Columbia. He lived in Surrey. Hall was defeated when he ran for reelection to the provincial assembly in 1975, when he lost to Bill Vander Zalm, and in 1983. He served in the provincial cabinet as Provincial Secretary and as Minister of Travel Industry. In 1974, Hall introduced a bill to establish British Columbia Day as a public holiday in the province.

He was 57 when he died of a heart attack in 1987.
