= Levoir =

Levoir (or LeVoir) is a French toponymic surname of langue d'oïl origin. According to lexicographer Lorédan Larchey, it means "elevated, having a wide view over surroundings" or alternatively le vrai, 'the true one'. Notable people with the surname include:

- Babe LeVoir (1913–1999), American football player
- Chris Levoir (1981–2013), Canadian musician
- John M. LeVoir (born 1946), American Catholic bishop
- Mark LeVoir (born 1982), American football player
