= Bill Vander Zalm =

Premier of British Columbia from 1986 to 1991

28th Premier of British Columbia
- In office August 6, 1986 – April 2, 1991
- Monarch: Elizabeth II
- Lieutenant Governor: Robert G. Rogers; David Lam
- Deputy: Grace McCarthy; Rita Johnston
- Preceded by: Bill Bennett
- Succeeded by: Rita Johnston

Leader of the British Columbia Social Credit Party
- In office 1986–1991
- Preceded by: Bill Bennett
- Succeeded by: Rita Johnston

Member of the British Columbia Legislative Assembly for Richmond
- In office October 22, 1986 – October 17, 1991 Serving with Nick Loenen
- Preceded by: James Arthur Nielsen
- Succeeded by: Riding Abolished

Member of the British Columbia Legislative Assembly for Surrey
- In office December 11, 1975 – May 5, 1983 Serving with Ernest Hall (1979-1983)
- Preceded by: Ernest Hall
- Succeeded by: Rita Johnston; William Earl Reid

Minister of Education of British Columbia
- In office August 10, 1982 – May 26, 1983
- Premier: Bill Bennett
- Preceded by: Brian Smith
- Succeeded by: Jack Heinrich

Minister of Municipal Affairs of British Columbia
- In office December 5, 1978 – August 10, 1982
- Premier: Bill Bennett
- Preceded by: Hugh Curtis (Municipal Affairs and Housing)
- Succeeded by: Jack Heinrich

Minister of Human Resources of British Columbia
- In office December 22, 1975 – December 5, 1978
- Premier: Bill Bennett
- Preceded by: Norman Levi
- Succeeded by: Grace McCarthy

29th Mayor of Surrey
- In office 1969 – December 11, 1975
- Preceded by: W.E. Stagg
- Succeeded by: Ed McKitka

Personal details
- Born: Wilhelmus Nicholaas Theodore Marie van der Zalm; May 29, 1934 (age 92) Noordwijkerhout, Netherlands
- Party: Social Credit Party
- Other political affiliations: British Columbia Reform Party (1999—2001); Liberal (before 1974)
- Spouse: Lillian Vander Zalm
- Occupation: Businessman, politician

William Nicholas Vander Zalm (born Wilhelmus Nicholaas Theodore Marie van der Zalm; May 29, 1934) is a Dutch-born Canadian businessman and politician who served as the 28th premier of British Columbia and leader of the British Columbia Social Credit Party from 1986 to 1991. He was a member of the Legislative Assembly (MLA) of British Columbia, representing the riding of Surrey from 1975 to 1983, and the riding of Richmond from 1986 to 1991. He is also the oldest lived premier in BC history and the first to reach the age of 92.

== Early life ==
Wilhelmus Nicholaas Theodore Marie van der Zalm was born and raised in Noordwijkerhout, Netherlands. He emigrated to Canada after World War II, settling in the Fraser Valley in 1947. After completing high school, he sold tulip bulbs and ultimately established himself in the gardening business. He moved to Surrey after marrying Lillian Mihalic, and purchased a nursery.

== Early political career ==
Vander Zalm was elected an alderman of Surrey in 1965, and served as the municipality's mayor from 1969 to 1975. His tenure was marked by his crackdown on welfare recipients (until the early 1970s, welfare in BC was a municipal responsibility).

He was originally a supporter of both the Liberal Party of Canada and the BC Liberal Party. He sought election to the House of Commons of Canada in the 1968 federal election as a Liberal in Surrey, but lost by 4,445 votes to New Democratic Party (NDP) candidate Barry Mather. He was a candidate at the 1972 provincial Liberal leadership convention, where he lost to David Anderson. He subsequently ran in the Surrey constituency for the Liberal Party in the 1972 provincial election, but lost to incumbent BC New Democratic Party candidate Ernest Hall.

== Social Credit MLA ==
Vander Zalm joined the BC Social Credit Party (Socred) in 1974, and was first elected to the Legislative Assembly of British Columbia in the 1975 election for the riding of Surrey. The Socreds won back power after a three-year hiatus, and Vander Zalm served in the cabinet of Premier Bill Bennett as minister of human resources from 1975 to 1978, where he continued his crusade against welfare fraud.

On June 22, 1978, the Victoria Daily Times published a political cartoon by Bob Bierman that portrayed the Minister of Human Resources as a grinning sadist, deliberately pulling the wings off flies. Vander Zalm launched legal action for libel, Vander Zalm v. Times Publishers. Justice Craig Munroe of the BC Supreme Court awarded Vander Zalm $3,500 in damages. The decision was overturned by the BC Court of Appeal in 1980, which was praised by journalists as a victory for free speech. The original cartoon was purchased by the National Archives of Canada for $350.

Vander Zalm was re-assigned as Minister of Municipal Affairs in December 1978, and kept the portfolio after winning re-election in 1979, before becoming Minister of Education in August 1982. In 1983, he publicly called on the Smithers school board to suspend teacher Madeleine Sauve without pay. Sauve distributed, without the permission of either parents or the local school board, a questionnaire concerning "mutual masturbation, oral sex, use of pornography and prostitution" to a class of Grade 8 students in Smithers.

He declined to run in the May 1983 provincial election. In 1984, he bought Fantasy Garden World, a theme park in Richmond, British Columbia. The same year, he ran unsuccessfully for mayor of Vancouver as the candidate for the Non-Partisan Association. He lost to the incumbent Mike Harcourt, who was later the provincial NDP leader during most of Vander Zalm's tenure as premier.

== Premier ==
In 1986, Premier Bennett announced he was retiring. Vander Zalm attracted considerable attention as he considered whether he would run for the leadership of the Social Credit Party. He generated more press from the race than the other candidates did. At the party's convention in Whistler, British Columbia, he prevailed over 11 other candidates (including future prime minister Kim Campbell) by winning on the fourth ballot, and was sworn in as premier on August 6, 1986.

During the 1986 provincial election campaign, "Vandermania" swept BC, and the Socreds easily won another term over the opposition BC NDP. Vander Zalm himself re-entered the legislature by winning one of the two seats in Richmond.

Vander Zalm promised a fresh start after the confrontational Bennett years, filling most of the cabinet slots with MLAs who had languished on the backbench under Bennett. He decided to release the normally secret list of cabinet appointments to two Vancouver Sun reporters hours before the official announcement was to be made. Under his watch, the Socred government took a more social conservative hue. This did not sit well with more moderate Socreds, who began drifting to the previously moribund Liberals—a trend that would haunt Vander Zalm's successors later.

On July 7, 1987, during the first session of the 34th Parliament, Vander Zalm's health minister Peter Dueck introduced the Health Statutes Amendment Act (Bill 34). This bill specified quarantine procedures for individuals with "serious reportable communicable disease." The bill was met with serious backlash and protest from HIV/AIDS activism groups like ACT UP, the Vancouver Lesbian Connection, and the Vancouver Persons With AIDS Coalition. The mobilization by activists in protest of the bill led to the formation of the Coalition for Responsible Health Legislation (CRHL) by Vancouver-based AIDS activists that led several actions for protest, but also education like safer sex workshops focused on preventing HIV transmission. The bill received Royal Assent on December 17, 1987, and was passed into law. The protests continued, but effort from the BC Civil Liberties Association shifted to the modification of the bill, rather than discarding it completely.

The government of Premier Bill Vander Zalm refused to fund the 1990 Gay Games in Vancouver and cited inappropriate usage of public resources.

In 1988, after the Supreme Court of Canada decision of R v Morgentaler, the provinces were now expected to cover abortion. Vander Zalm chose not to extend provincial medical coverage to abortion by citing that abortions were an elective procedure and not medically necessary.

Vander Zalm became embroiled in an alleged conflict of interest controversy over the sale of his Fantasy Gardens flower garden and theme park. The conflict of interest arose because the Taiwanese buyer, Tan Yu, was provided VIP treatment by members of the Vander Zalm Government prior to the sale. Adding fuel to the fire, Faye Leung, a Chinese-Canadian entrepreneur and the woman who brokered the deal, claimed that Vander Zalm was a "bad man" since the day she first met him and secretly recorded conversations she had with him, which were subsequently leaked to the media. For her part in the affair, Leung would later be convicted of four counts of secret commissions over 100k, and one count of theft over 45k, and two counts of fraud in 1995 by the BC Court of Appeals.

Vander Zalm resigned in 1991 after a provincial conflict of interest report by Ted Hughes found that he had mixed private business with his public office in the sale of the Gardens. He was charged with criminal breach of trust, but was acquitted in BC Supreme Court in 1992. The judge ruled that Vander Zalm had acted in a manner that was "foolish, ill-advised and in apparent or real conflict of interest or breach of ethics", but that the prosecution had not proved its case beyond a reasonable doubt. It was revealed that during the sale of Fantasy Gardens, Vander Zalm had accepted $20,000 payment in cash from Tan Yu, the buyer of Fantasy Gardens, to which Vander Zalm said he took "for innocent reasons relating to travel and expenses incurred."

Vander Zalm was succeeded as premier by Deputy Premier Rita Johnston, who defeated Grace McCarthy in the race to replace him as Socred leader. Contrary to popular belief that the party would thrive under new leadership, Social Credit collapsed to a distant third in the 1991 election, with the NDP returning to government and the Liberals becoming official opposition. The Social Credit Party were completely shut out of the legislature in the subsequent 1996 election and never again won seats.

== Later career ==
=== Leadership of British Columbia Reform Party ===
Vander Zalm returned to politics in November 1999 when he was acclaimed as leader of the Reform Party of British Columbia. Shortly after, he ran in a December 1999 provincial by-election in Delta South, but finished second with 32.91% of the vote behind BC Liberal Party candidate Val Roddick, who received 59.63%. The BC Green Party came in third place and the governing NDP finished in a distant fourth place with just 2.44%, their worst showing ever.

He attempted to orchestrate a merger of the Reform Party with other right-wing parties, but ran into stiff opposition. Vander Zalm and supporters within the party would later merge with several other small right-wing parties to form the British Columbia Unity Party. The Reform Party was de-registered as a BC political party in 2001 and Vander Zalm retired from politics. He now lives in Ladner.

=== Successful campaign against HST ===
Vander Zalm returned to the political spotlight in 2009, alongside Bill Tieleman, as a recurring critic of the provincial government's conversion of the Provincial Sales Tax to the Harmonized Sales Tax (HST). A series of populist rallies led to him becoming the official proponent, in accordance with the Recall and Initiative Act, of a petition seeking a referendum to cancel the HST. Vander Zalm established a website, FightHST, to promote the initiative. The provincial Liberal government countered Vander Zalm's campaign and devoted a section of their website to the positive aspects of the HST.

For the petition to be certified, there was a requirement to secure the signatures of a minimum of 10% of all registered voters on the provincial voters list in each riding in the province, no later than June 30, 2010. On that date, Vander Zalm delivered 85 boxes containing 705,643 signatures from voters in every riding across the province. Those signatures represented some 45% of votes cast in the 2009 provincial election.

On August 11, 2010, Elections BC verified the official anti-HST petition submitted by the province's Fight HST campaign. Vander Zalm said he was pleased with the result, but "very disappointed" to learn the province's chief electoral officer would not act on the petition until all court proceedings involving the tax were complete. The anti-HST campaign turned its attention to a recall campaign for Liberal MLAs. Vander Zalm told reporters. "We will recall every Liberal MLA in the province, if that's what it takes." However, the initial attempts at recalls were unsuccessful.

On August 20, 2010, Chief Justice Robert J. Bauman ruled that the petition was valid. Bauman said Elections BC was correct when it approved the petition on August 11.

On September 14, 2010, it was announced a referendum would be held September 24, 2011 on repealing the HST. Premier Gordon Campbell stated a simple majority (50%+1) of those eligible and casting ballots would be sufficient for the government to cancel the HST if the referendum went against the government.

The 2011 British Columbia sales tax referendum was conducted by Elections BC via mail-in ballot throughout June and July 2011. The question on the ballot was: Are you in favour of extinguishing the HST (Harmonized Sales Tax) and reinstating the PST (Provincial Sales Tax) in conjunction with the GST (Goods and Services Tax)? Yes or No

On August 26, 2011, Elections BC revealed the results of the referendum: 55% of 1.6 million voters in favour of abolishing the HST. The BC Liberals revealed a plan to re-instate the GST/PST system within 18 months, with a target date of March 31, 2013.

=== 2012 defamation suit ===
In 2012, a BC Supreme Court judge and jury heard a defamation lawsuit lodged against Vander Zalm by retired conflict-of-interest commissioner Ted Hughes. The former judge alleged that he had been defamed in Vander Zalm's 2008 self-published autobiography, For The People. The book suggested that Hughes, then in an interim appointment, may have conducted an unfair inquiry of Vander Zalm in 1991 by the prospect of achieving a permanent employment.

Vander Zalm defended the statements about Hughes, saying they had been fair comments, not facts, and that they had been made as a matter of public interest. Vander Zalm was found liable and ordered to pay $60,000 in damages, with Hughes to pay his own costs.
