= Surrey-Guildford-Whalley =

Defunct provincial electoral district in British Columbia, Canada

Surrey-Guildford-Whalley was a provincial electoral district in the Canadian province of British Columbia in 1986 only. The riding's predecessor was the Surrey riding, which first appeared in the 1933 election.

== Electoral history ==
Note: Winners in each election are in bold.

34th British Columbia election, 1986
Party	Candidate	Votes	%	±	Expenditures
Social Credit	John Marvin Hunt	10,891	41.71%	–	unknown
Liberal	Donald Alvin Ross	4,171	15.97%		unknown
New Democratic	**Joan Smallwood**	**11,049**	**42.32%**		unknown
Total valid votes		26,111	100.00%		
Total rejected ballots		457			
Turnout		%			

The population boom in Surrey saw Surrey further redistributed after 1986.

== See also ==
- List of British Columbia provincial electoral districts
- Canadian provincial electoral districts
- Vancouver (electoral districts)
