= Revisions (Stargate SG-1) =

- Stargate SG-1 episode
- Episode no.: Season 7 Episode 5
- Directed by: Martin Wood
- Written by: Joseph Mallozzi; Paul Mullie
- Cinematography by: Jim Menard
- Editing by: Brad Rines
- Production code: P271
- Original air date: July 11, 2003
- Running time: 44 minutes

Guest appearances
- Christopher Heyerdahl as Pallan; Peter Lacroix as Kendrick; Tiffany Lyndall-Knight as Evalla; Liam Ranger as Nevin

Episode chronology
← Previous "Orpheus"	Next → "Lifeboat"
- Stargate SG-1 (season 7)

"Revisions" is the 5th episode from the seventh season of the science fiction television series Stargate SG-1 and is the 137th episode overall. It was first broadcast on the Sci-Fi Channel on July 11, 2003. The episode was written by Joseph Mallozzi and Paul Mullie and was directed by Martin Wood.

In the episode, Stargate Command discovers a civilization living in a seemingly perfect dome on an otherwise toxic, unliveable planet. After making contact, SG-1 learn that the inhabitants are all neurologically connected to a central computer known as The Link, from which they can access any information, at any time. Believing everything is not as it seems, Major Samantha Carter (Amanda Tapping) learns from one of the inhabitants, Pallan (Christopher Heyerdahl), about their technology, whilst Dr. Daniel Jackson (Michael Shanks) attempts to find out more about planets history and the dome's creation.

The writers pitched the episode as a standalone story, that would not rely on any of the greater mythology of the show, whilst hoping to recapture the team-driven exploration stories found in earlier seasons of Stargate SG-1.

== Plot ==
Stargate Command makes contact with a planet with a toxic atmosphere, on which a strange dome exists. The MALP probe is able to enter the dome, where inside they see a beautiful landscape. SG-1 journey to the planet and after discovering the dome has a breathable landscape soon encounter a young boy named Nevin (Liam Ranger). Nevin takes the team to his town to meet his father, Kendrick (Peter Lacroix) who sends them to their ruling council. There, SG-1 learn that the townspeople are all connected through a neural interface to a large library of knowledge, which they can access at any time, known as the link. Interested to learn more about the inhabitants, the team stay in the town overnight, with Colonel O'Neill (Richard Dean Anderson) and Teal'c (Christopher Judge) staying with Kendrick and Nevin, who becomes enthralled in the idea of becoming an explorer. Meanwhile, Major Carter (Amanda Tapping) and Dr. Jackson (Michael Shanks) stay with Pallan (Christopher Heyerdahl), a technician who maintains the dome and his wife Evalla (Tiffany Lyndall-Knight). They discuss the premise and concept of the Link, even offering Daniel a chance at accessing the huge pool of knowledge. During the night, unbeknownst to SG-1 or the townspeople, a woman from the ruling council awakens and exits the protective dome.

In the morning, Pallan shows Sam the control room for the Link while Evalla takes Daniel to the unused library. While Sam looks at the control interfaces of the Link, the monitors suddenly flash some strange code and every person in the city suddenly stop for a few seconds, staring blankly into space as the council had, then continue on, as if nothing happened. SG-1 offers the council the option of relocation, to which they dismiss. Daniel then inquires about the woman who was on the council when they last met, to which they rebuke the idea of ever having a woman on the council. Afterwards, Sam interfaces with the Link through a laptop and suddenly becomes alarmed with several problems Pallan is unaware of. Yet, after Sam tries to convince of impending danger, Pallan will not believe his instruments lie. After agreeing to take Nevin and Kendrick to another world, Teal'c and O'Neill soon discover that the MALP is missing, with Sam determining that the dome is losing integrity and collapsing in on itself. Evalla suddenly leaves Daniel, who despite following, soon loses track of her.

After going to retrieve the hazmat suits, O'Neill and Teal'c encounter Nevin who brings them to a building, which he claims is his home. Kendrick and Nevin are entirely unaware that they have moved house and also deny having ever asked to go to another world with O'Neill and Teal'c. Daniel makes the discovery that there were once some 100,000 people living in the dome, whilst Sam determines that the power-supply is failing and the Link is killing off inhabitants and altering the memories of those left in order to preserve the rest of the population and dome as long as possible. Unable to convince Pallan, who cannot even remember his wife Evalla, Sam forcefully removes the Link device from him. As the rest of the population, now fully controlled by the link move to surround O'Neill and Teal'c, Pallan is able to reprogram the Link to erase all knowledge of SG-1, causing the inhabitants to stand down. The townspeople remove their links and over the following days are helped to relocate to another world by Stargate Command.

== Production ==
=== Development and casting ===
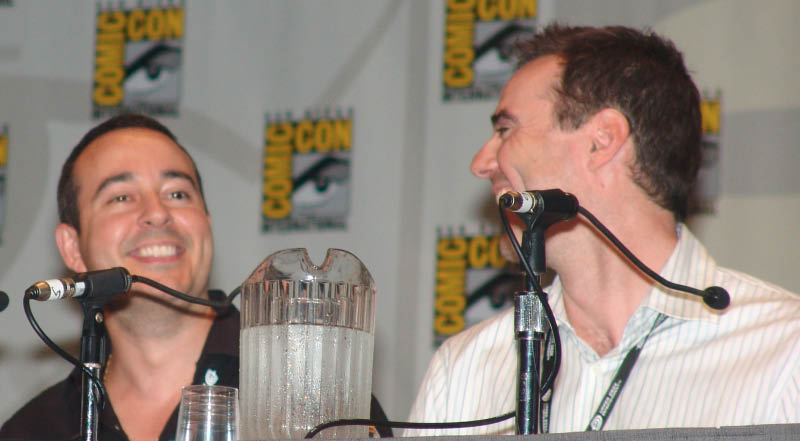
The episode was written by Joseph Mallozzi (left) and Paul Mullie (right).

The episode was written by writing duo & co-executive producers Paul Mullie and Joseph Mallozzi. During the episodes development, it was originally known as "Bubble World" and was pitched as a standalone episode that did not rely on any of the ongoing story arcs or greater mythology of the show. According to Mullie, the genesis of the story had been "kicking around in different versions for a couple of years". The duos original pitch was for a far darker story, however, executive producer Robert C. Cooper steered them in a different direction. After putting the story to the rest of the writing staff, a number of changes were made; the character name Evanna was changed to Evalla, with Mallozzi commenting that "Evanna reminds Paul of Ivana Trump", whilst the young boy, who was originally called Aidan was instead changed to be Nevin and Parlan became Pallan. Writing the script, Mallozzi and Mullie constructed the dialog in their typical manner "throwing out variations on lines, different attacks on the respective scenes", with the complete process taking some 2 weeks to complete, whilst also working on other stories and their responsibilities as producers on the show. As the pair were drafting, Mallozzi commented that a detail regarding the way in which the "computer reboots the system" initially caused their entire story to unravel under scrutiny, but was fixed by giving additional detail on the parameters of the computer in the story. In an earlier draft of the story, Daniel Jackson would have tried on the link and had his memories altered; with the team having to try and get through to him in the episodes climax. Mallozzi explained that this was taken out of the story as "it seemed highly unlikely that they would risk connecting to that alien device before having it thoroughly tested first".

Director Martin Wood noted that a number of changes were made to the story due to budget constraints and Richard Dean Anderson's reduced schedule, with the original intention that the scenes involving O'Neill and Teal'c being perused around the town by the inhabitants would take place at night. Additionally, the final scene of the show would have originally involved the entire team talking to Pallan and the other townspeople, but this was reduced to just Sam and Pallan. Mallozzi later commented that it was a rare script for him, in that he knew exactly where he wanted to the end the episode, with "a final moment in which one of the characters asks Carter to tell him about the wife he no longer remember". Discussing the original, darker concept for the episode, Mallozzi expressed his reluctance to reveal the "shocking conclusion" that he originally envisioned, "because the story we ended up with was so different that I'd love to repurpose it given some future opportunity", later stating that he might adapt the original pitch into an episode of his series Dark Matter.

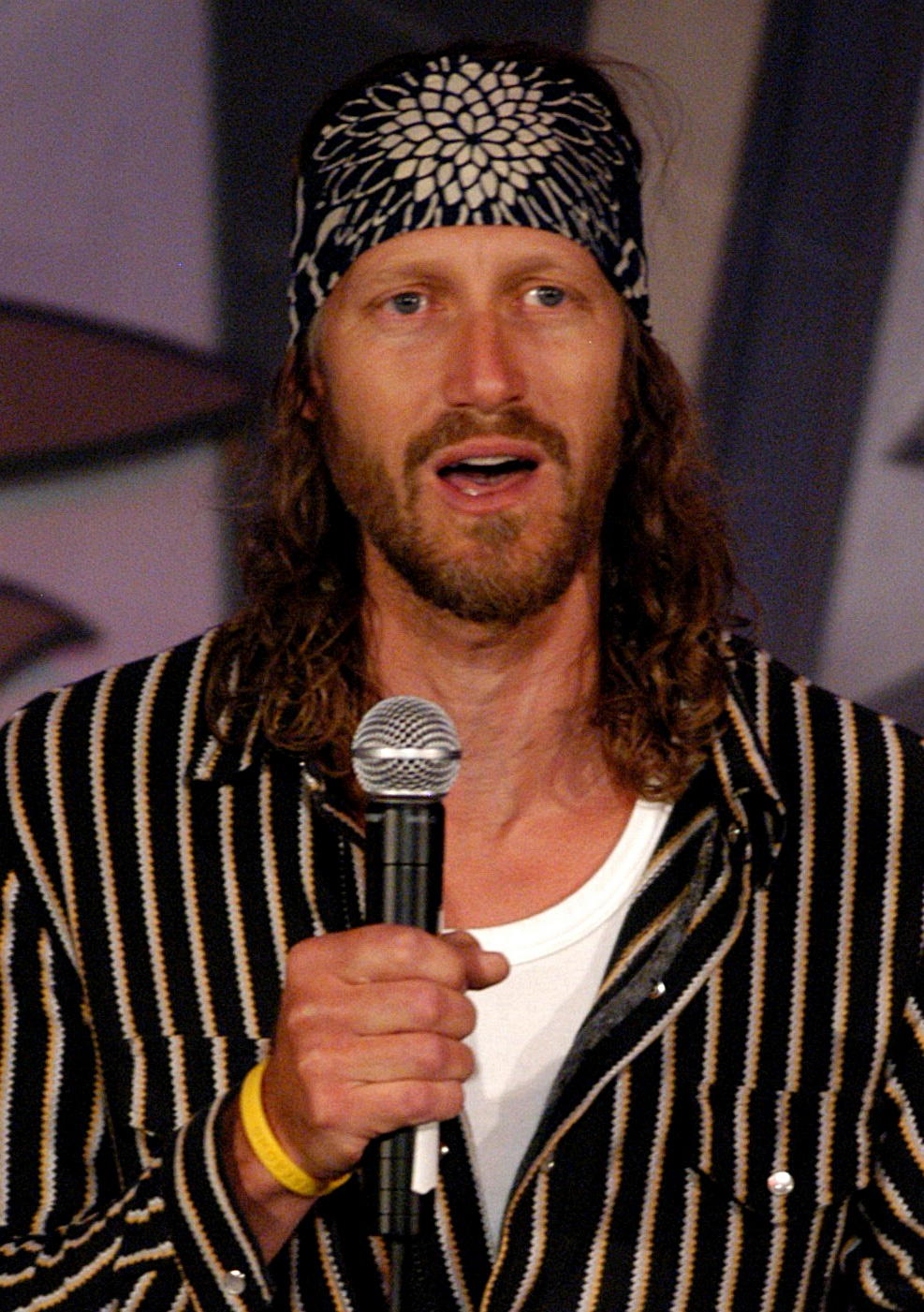
Christopher Heyerdahl makes his first appearance in the franchise

"Revisions" marks the first appearance of Christopher Heyerdahl in the franchise, playing Pallan in this episode. After being cast in the episode, Heyerdahl and director Martin Wood realised they were neighbours and went on to become friends. The following year, Heyerdahl was cast as Halling, a reoccurring character on spinoff Stargate Atlantis and would later play another reoccurring character nicknamed "Todd". Heyerdahl, along with Amanda Tapping also went on to star in Sanctuary together, with Wood producing. Peter LaCroix was cast as Kendrick, with director Martin Wood commenting that he felt enough time had passed since LaCroix previously played the Goa'uld Ashrak in the season 2 episode "In the Line of Duty". Liam Ranger portrays the character of Nevin, whilst Tiffany Knight plays Evalla, having previously portrayed a Jaffa in "Within the Serpent's Grasp" and La Moor in "Touchstone". Gary Jones reprises his role of Walter Harriman. Episode director Martin Wood cameos as a Stargate Command technician, as does writer-director Peter DeLuise. Shank's stand-in Finn Michael portrays both Daniel Jackson and a councilman.

=== Design ===
Location manager Lynn Smith began scouting for locations whilst Mullie and Mollozzi were still writing their script. Mullie commented that they wanted the location to convey an aura that the world was "too good to be true", with Mullie elaborating "we wanted to create a kind of mini-perfect, almost Disneyland-esque little village". The team discovered and secured use of an amusement park, Fantasy Gardens in Richmond, British Columbia for the episode. Mallozzi commented that the location worked perfectly as it "looks like a place that has no reason to exist, but it actually does", going on to note that "it looks so fake. But we wanted it to look fake". When dressing the set, the production team were careful to make sure that there were no photographs or portraits used for decoration in order to further the idea that the inhabitants would have no idea that people were disappearing from the dome. Costume designer Christina McQuarrie dressed the inhabitants of the alien world with very little colour in any of the outfits, as well as making the garments very form-fitting and smart. Wood wanted this to contrast the colourful world and also give the impression that they weren't technologically advanced, as well as making them look creepy and unusual. A big discussion point during production meetings was whether or not to show the Link that was controlling the inhabitants, ultimately opting for a small removable implant that would sit on the side of the subjects face.

The computer core was created back on a soundstage. Director Martin Wood gave production designer Bridget McGuire the brief of creating a space with lots of plexiglass and "things we don't see" in the alien village itself. McGuire continued the red brick aesthetic found at Fantasy Gardens at the entrance of the room, then looked to create a space that contrasted "the quaintness of the village", opting for a "very futuristic, shiny and quite stark" look. Art director Peter Bodnarus explained that they reworked "honey-coomb looking creates and turning them into our idea of a self-replicating building block-type of alien world" for the walls of the structure. New addition to the production design team, Rodrigo Segovia commented that creating the centre console for the room was his "trial by fire" and that they wanted to create a piece that was "a standalone piece, yet had to fully integrate with the rest of the set elements".

When I was handed Revisions, what I ended up doing was taking a direction that the script didn't have it in, which was, I made it creepy. It sort of made your skin crawl a little bit when you went, 'What the hell is going on here?' It wasn't, 'Oh, we're on a planet where there's happy shining people, a "Red Sky" kind of feeling, where these people don't understand, and we have to convince them that this is real.' I wanted it to be a little weirder for SG-1. So when SG-1 got there, there was all this unease that they had. Certainly when Joel added the music to it, he went creepy on it. And that's the sense I got in Revisions.

— Director Martin Wood discussing "Revisions"

The exterior of the alien dome was created on the sound stage at Norco Studio, dressed to look like building ruins. A combination of heavy backlighting and smoke was then used to create the illusion of the world being sulfurous. Wood's intention was the SG-1 to "walk up to the side of a great, blue dome" which would be computer-generated in post-production. Visual effects supervisor James Tichenor noted that the exterior of the dome and subsequent pass-through was one of the trickier effects of the first part of season 7, commenting that "usually, you don't want any smoke in your effects shots -- when you put in the CG, how to you match the smoke levels to the rest of the plate". Tichenor had considered filming the scene without smoke against a greenscreen, however the camera placement for the scene made it prohibitive to do so. As production was running three different main unit crews simultaneously that day, each shooting different episodes, the faces of team were obscured by the hazmat suits, allowing the lead-actors stand-ins to portray the roles of SG-1, including Dan Shea standing in for O'Neill and Finn Michael for Jackson and Herbert Duncanson for Teal'c.

=== Filming and post-production ===
Filming at Fantasy Gardens took place in March 2003 and was 1 of 3 episode being filmed simultaneously by production at the time. Directed by Martin Wood, with director of photography Jim Menard, filming presented a number of challenges for production. The gardens of Fantasy Gardens were surrounded by a highway, which made them mostly unusable due to noise, so a second location, VanDusen Botanical Garden in Vancouver also had to be used for scenes outside of the alien town. Many of the buildings within Fantasy Gardens were only façades, with only a small number of rooms big enough for the productions requirements. As such, many of the rooms were redressed to serve as multiple locations, as were the exterior streets. The location also featured a Christian church, which despite Wood's attempt to obscure from view, ended up briefly appearing in the finished episode.

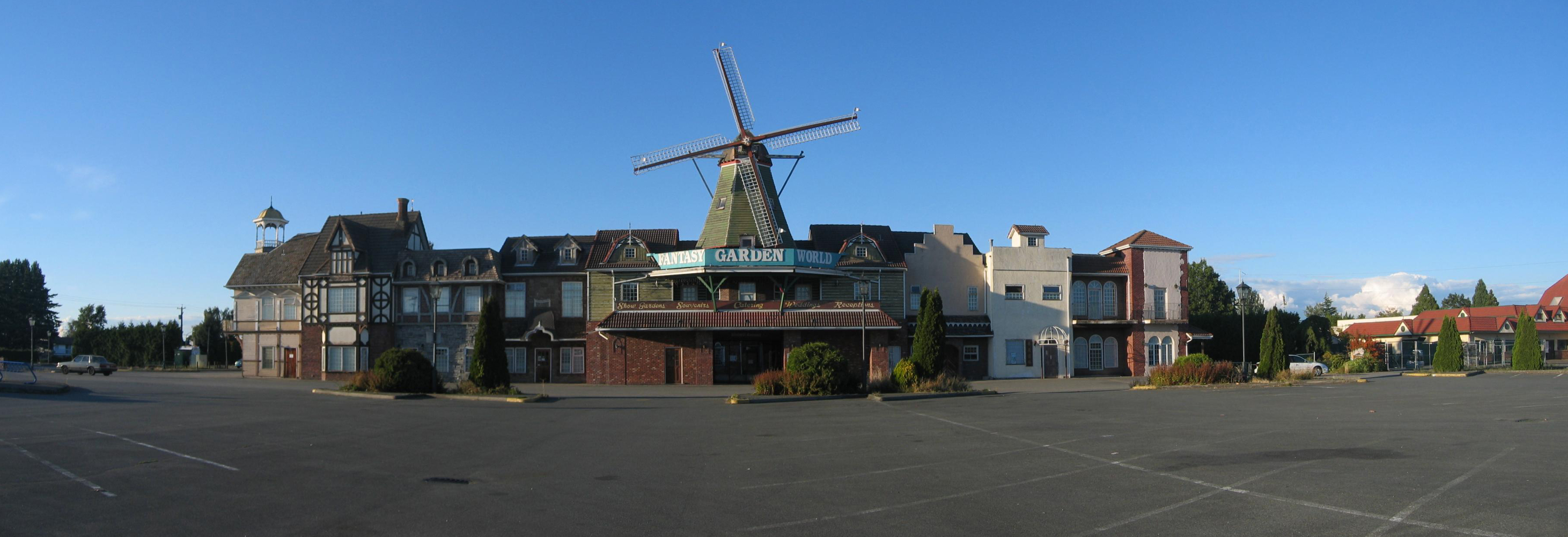
The amusement park, Fantasy Gardens in Richmond, British Columbia served as the primary location of the alien world visited by SG-1.

As the town at Fantasy Gardens was far smaller than the alien world imagined in the script, director Martin Wood wanted to try and make the location appear larger than it actually was in camera. Wood placed an emphasis on using crane shots, often looking down onto the village and the characters, whilst also predominately opting to use wide-angle camera lenses, not using anything longer than 25mm. He hoped this would keep the audience "off-centred" and give the impression the town was far larger. Additionally, Wood tried to keep the camera moving during scenes, using "creeping" movements in an attempt to make the audience feel uncomfortable, as if "something isn't quite right". As the episode would not be spending much time at any of the established locations, Wood gave Menard free rein when deciding on the lighting and use of colour for episode. Menard relied on more bright and saturated colour grading for many of the daytime scenes, whilst noting that particularly for the night shots he "keyed the whole place with primary colours, so that the shadows and the layers are actually three different colours", with the intent of reflecting the fact that the village was surrounded by a projection. Wood noted that the original cut of the story was around 7 minutes too-long.

== Release ==
=== Broadcast and reception ===
"Revisions" was first broadcast on July 11, 2003 on the Sci-Fi Channel in the United States. According to Nielsen ratings, the episode had a 1.5 household rating. In the United Kingdom, the episode was first shown on Sky One on October 27, 2003 and drew an estimated 780,000 viewers, making it Sky One's 8th most popular broadcast that week.

Jan Vincent-Rudzki for TV Zone positively received the episode, awarding it 8/10 in what they described as "what may be the most horrific episode of Stargate SG-1 to date". The reviewer felt that the horror of the episode was well underplayed and appreciated that the computer controlling the population "is just that", rather than a device that "Sam, or perhaps O'Neill has to argue with and make it realize the error of its ways", drawing parallels to the program from Terminator 3: Rise of the Machines. Darren Rea for Sci-fi Online hailed the episode as "one of the most visually stunning episodes of this season to date", praising the episode for revisiting the series earlier format of more standalone "planet and alien race of the week", calling it a "welcome change of pace".

Writing for SFX, Jayne Dearsley awarded the episode 3 out of 5 stars, commenting "this is about as average as an episode of Stargate can get, although that's not necessarily a bad thing". Dearsley praised the effects, locations and costume design but was critical that "O'Neill bonds with a little kid for about the millionth time in the history of Stargate". The reviewer went on to list all the times that members of SG-1 have bonded with children and suggested "having a kid that none of them like, none of them bond with and no-one cares about for once".

Of the reviews featured on fan website GateWorld, one contributor commented that despite the episode seemingly trying to return to the team-based exploration stories found in the earlier years of SG-1, "Revisions" "didn't quite manage to capture the old magic". A lack of any real danger or tension was one of main criticisms, whilst the team dynamic between Jack & Teal'c was highlighted by the author for providing "light-hearted moments" and Sam & Daniel "doing what they do best". Co-writer of the episode, Joseph Mallozzi included the episode amongst a list of what he believed to be the 10 most underrated episodes of the Stargate franchise.

=== Home media ===
"Revisions", along with subsequent episodes "Lifeboat", "Enemy Mine" and "Space Race" were first released on Region 2 DVD on March 8, 2004 as part of the "Volume 33" standalone disc, before being released as part of the Season 7 boxset on October 19, 2004. A "SG-1 Directors Series: Revisions" is included amongst the DVD's special features, providing a behind the scenes look at the film of the episode, whilst the DVD audio commentary was provided by Michael Shanks, director Martin Wood and director of photography Jim Menard.

The episodes along with the rest of season 7 were first made available digitally in January 2008 through iTunes and Amazon Unbox. The episode, along with every other episode of the series, were made available to stream for the first time through Netflix in the USA on August 15, 2010. Along with the rest of the series, the episode has been upscaled for releases on various streaming platforms and the 2020 Blu-ray release.
