= Richard Collins (actor) =

Canadian actor (1947–2013)

- Born: March 19, 1947; St. John's, Newfoundland (now Newfoundland and Labrador, Canada)
- Died: April 15, 2013 (aged 66); Halifax, Nova Scotia, Canada
- Occupation: Actor
- Years active: 1983–2013
- Children: 3

Richard Collins (March 19, 1947 – April 15, 2013) was a Canadian actor. He was best known for playing Philadelphia "Phil" Collins in the comedy series Trailer Park Boys. In 2011, he also appeared as Big Ron in The Drunk and On Drugs Happy Fun Time Hour. Other notable roles include the role of "Uncle Joe" in Snake Eater, "Rosie" in the movie Siege, an appearance in the episode 'Luvliner' of the series Lexx, and various small appearances in movies and tv shows such as Matters of Life and Dating and Shattered City: The Halifax Explosion.

Collins was born in St. John's, Newfoundland (now Newfoundland and Labrador, Canada) (two years before Newfoundland become a province of Canada Newfoundland and Labrador) and lived in Halifax, Nova Scotia, for most of his life. He died of a heart attack in Halifax on April 15, 2013, at the age of 66, during the filming of Trailer Park Boys: Don't Legalize It. The film is dedicated to him, Rita MacNeil (who died the next day), Brian Huggins, Brian Ryan and Bill Parsons.

== Filmography ==
=== Film ===
Year	Title	Role	Notes
1983	Siege	Rosie	
1989	Snake Eater	Uncle Joe	Credited as "Rick Collins"
2004	The Straitjacket Lottery	Peter Flemming	
2004	The Cab Driver	Mr. Dexter	Short film
2006	Trailer Park Boys: The Movie	Philadelphia Collins	
2007	Matters Of Life And Dating	Pizza Man	
2009	Trailer Park Boys: Countdown to Liquor Day	Philadelphia Collins	
2014	Trailer Park Boys: Don't Legalize It	Philadelphia Collins	Final role; posthumous release

=== Television ===
Year	Title	Role	Notes
1999	Lexx	Fat Man	1 episode; credited as "Rick Collins"
2002	Blackfly	Gary	1 episode
2002	All Saints	Dr. Hicks	1 episode
2003	Shattered City: The Halifax Explosion	Mont Blanc Engineer	2 episodes
2004	Snakes & Ladders	Chapman	1 episode
2004–2008	Trailer Park Boys	Phil Collins	14 episodes
2007	Matters of Life and Dating	Pizza Man	Television film
2011	The Drunk and on Drugs Happy Funtime Hour	Big Ron Murphy	1 episode
