= Fantasy Gardens =

Former amusement park in Richmond, British Columbia, Canada

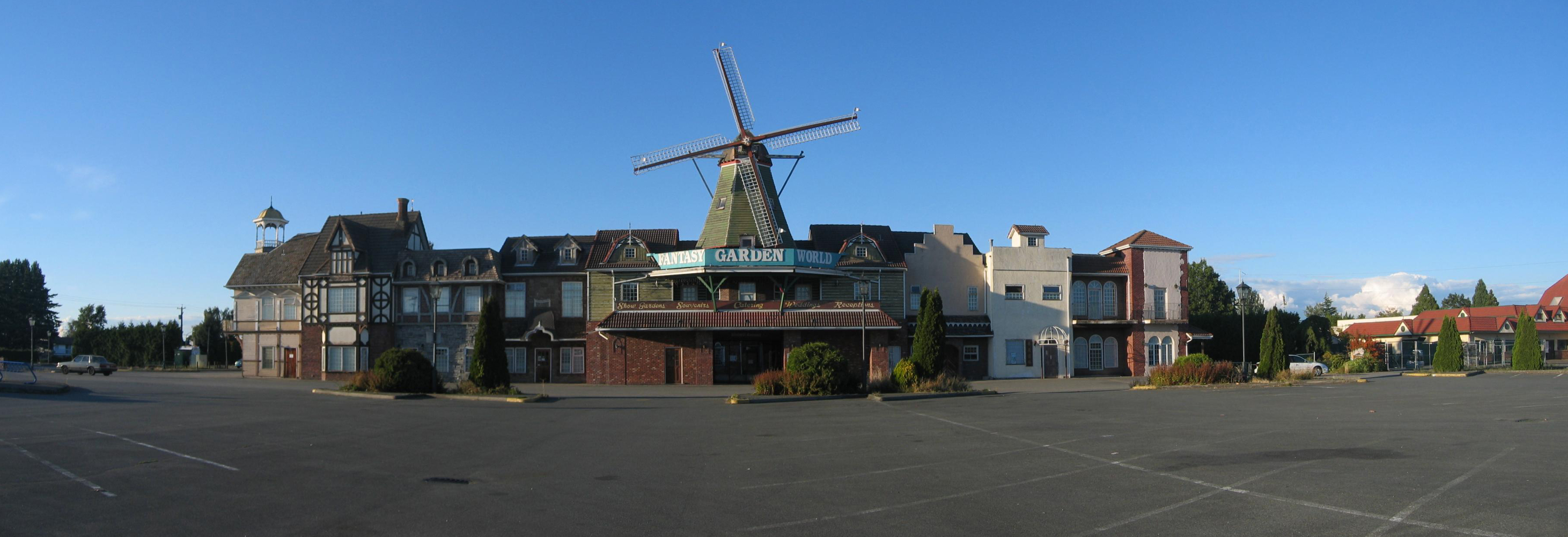
- A panorama of Fantasy Gardens.
- Interactive map of Fantasy Gardens
- Location: Richmond, British Columbia
- Coordinates: 49°08′07″N 123°5′25″W
- Opened: 1970s
- Closed: 2010
- Owner: Bill Vander Zalm 1984-1990; Tan Yu/Asiaworld Internationale Group 1990-2006; Townline Homes 2007-present

Fantasy Gardens, also known as Fantasy Garden World, was an amusement park in Richmond, British Columbia that was located at the corner of Steveston Highway and No. 5 Road. The park was called Fantasy Gardens because it was surrounded by a series of stone buildings that were designed to resemble structures built during the Middle Ages. The buildings had been used as a backdrop in numerous music videos, television productions, and movies (it stood in for Halloweentown in Halloweentown II: Kalabar's Revenge).

Behind the stone buildings were the Biblical Gardens. These gardens were filled with numerous religious icons, including a hedge that had been carved into the shape of a Bible.

== History ==
=== As garden centre ===
Fantasy Gardens was home to a massive plant store in the Art Knapp's chain, owned by Frank Van Hest (1932-2005) in 1965. Bill Vander Zalm's son Wim owned several other stores in the Art Knapp's chain. Many people visited the store to get a glimpse of its turtle-filled pond. This plant store closed its location at Fantasy Gardens, moving to a vacant nursery one mile west along Alderbridge Way and Minoru Boulevard. The Art Knapp's Nursery stores were founded by Arthur William Knapp, a longtime resident of Victoria, British Columbia, Canada.

=== As amusement park ===
During the 1970s and early 1990s, there was a small-scale amusement park at Fantasy Gardens. The biggest attraction was a miniature railroad that visitors could ride throughout the park and the gardens. When the fair closed down, most of the miniature railroad tracks were ripped up. Before being closed, this miniature railroad was filmed and it appeared in The X-Files episode "The Calusari."

In 1984, the gardens were bought by Bill Vander Zalm, who established the Christian theme of much of the park. Then a provincial MLA, Vander Zalm went on to be Premier of British Columbia. His later sale of the park led to charges of conflict of interest, which in turn led to his resignation in 1991 and the defeat of the Social Credit government.

=== Decline, closure and residential re-development ===
Vander Zalm sold the property in the early 1990s to Chinese-born Filipino-Taiwanese businessman Tan Yu for $16 million, whose AsiaWorld then sold it to local developer firm Townline in 2007 that redeveloped into retail property named The Gardens.

On 7 September 2010, Fantasy Gardens was torn down, but the Dutch Castle, now a community landmark, was saved. The castle is a replica of Coevorden Castle, possibly the ancestral home of Captain George Vancouver in the Netherlands. The castle was donated to the people of Vancouver by the city of Coevorden for Expo 86. The castle was used as sales centre for the Gardens, a planned residential development. The southern portion is now a condo complex with a Loblaws supermarket, but the former amusement park will become a 12 acres public park for the further residential buildings. The former Dutch/Coevorden Castle will become a City of Richmond-owned day care centre.

== Filming on site ==
The site was also used as the primary set of the "Revisions" episode of the TV series Stargate SG-1, the "Irresponsible" episode of Stargate Atlantis, the "Monster Movie" episode of Supernatural and in the episodes "Shadows" and "Blackmail" episodes from Highlander: The Series.

It was also featured in the Sliders episode "Into The Mystic", the Psych episode "Christmas Joy" and the movie I'll Be Home for Christmas, Cousins as well as The Boy Who Cried Werewolf.

== Gallery ==
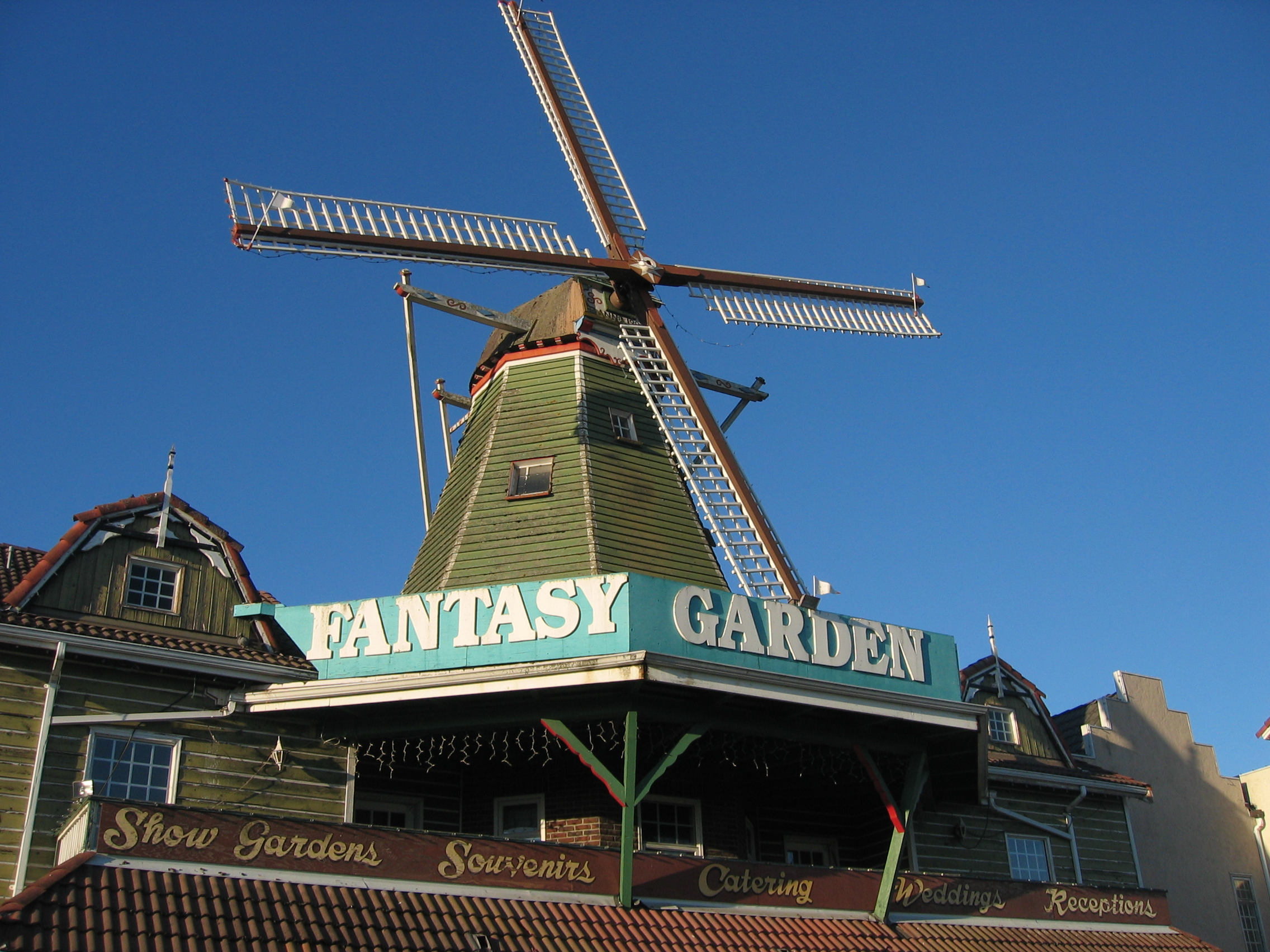
The windmill entrance

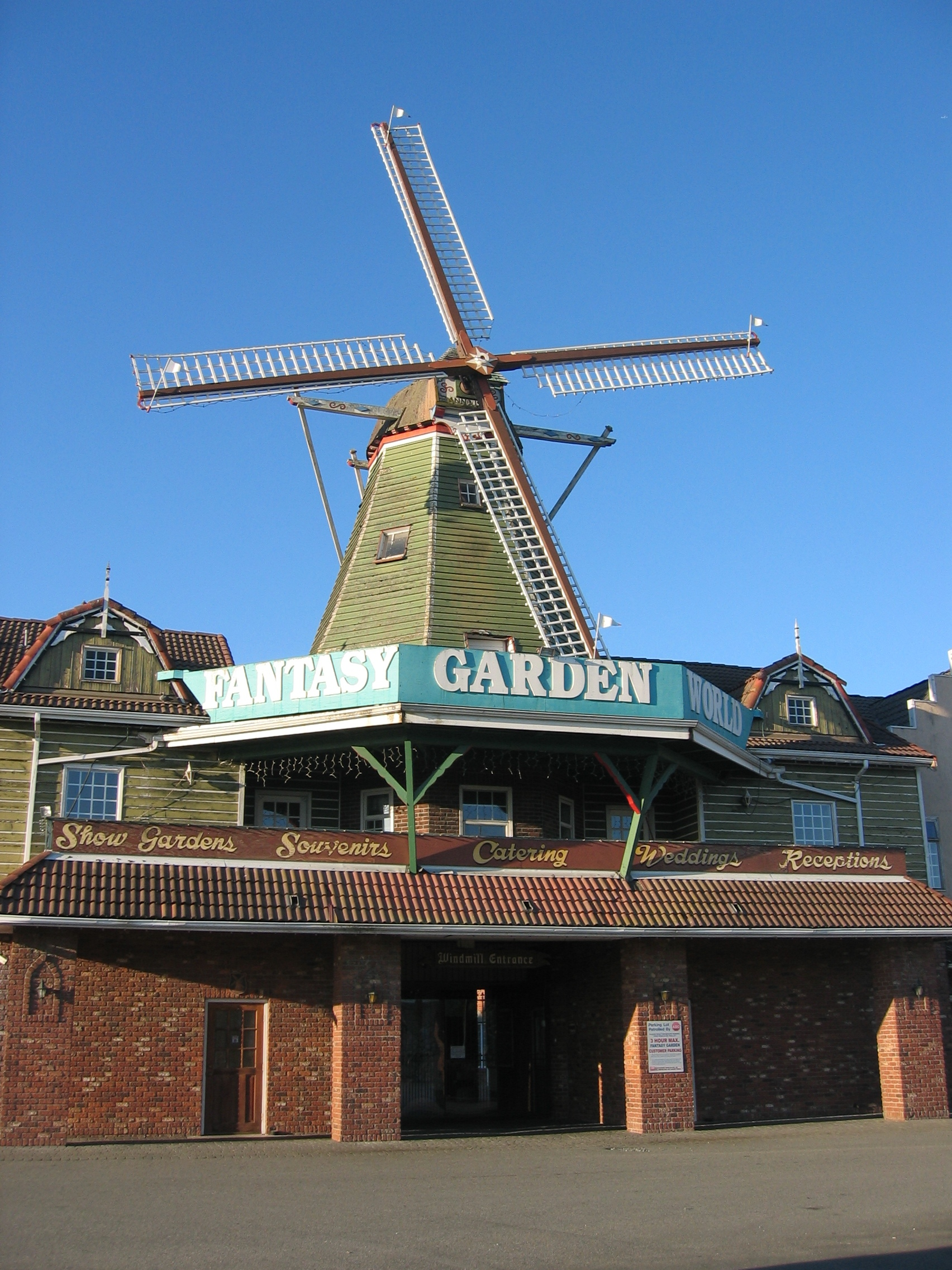
Another angle of the windmill

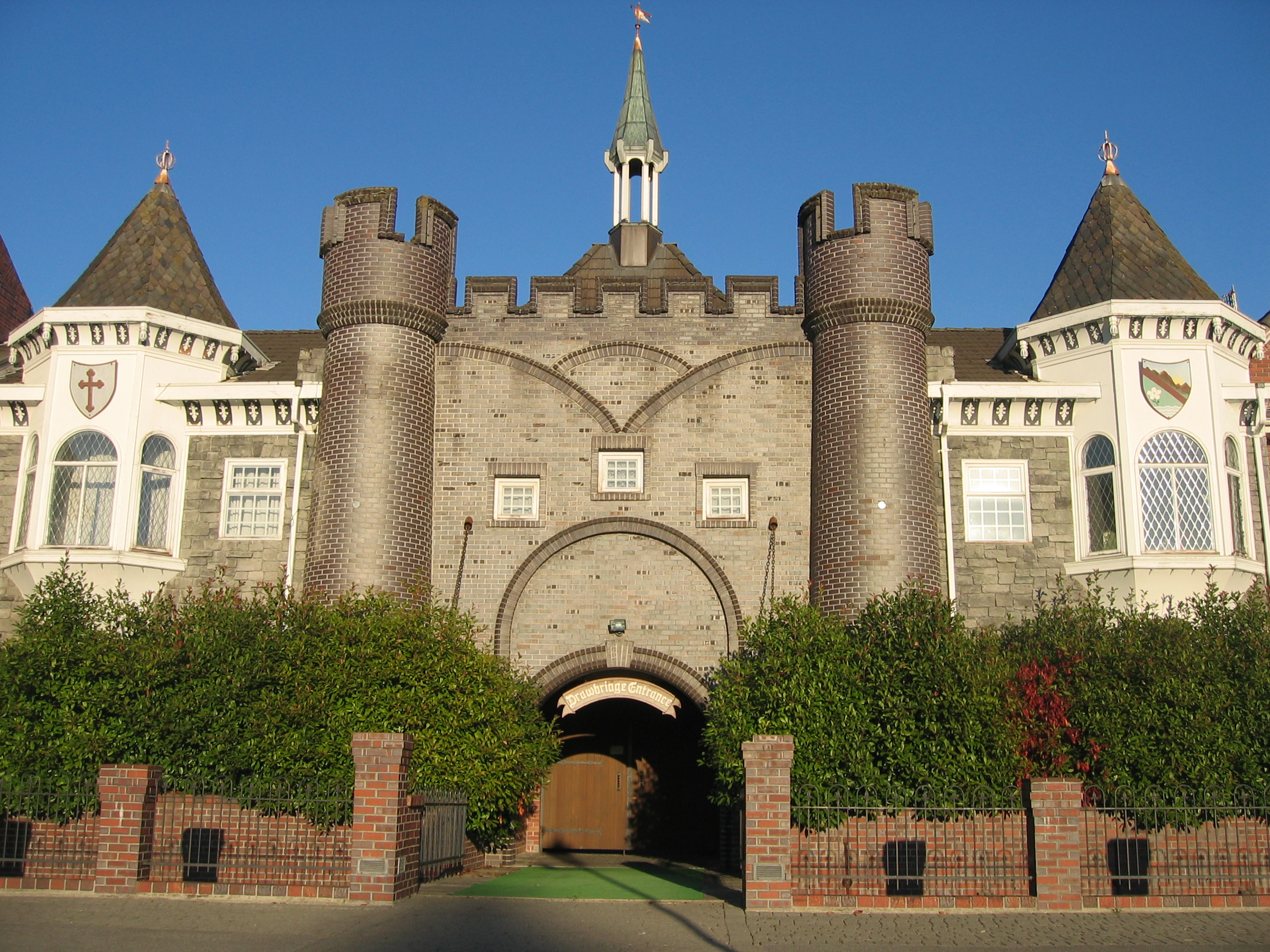
The drawbridge entrance

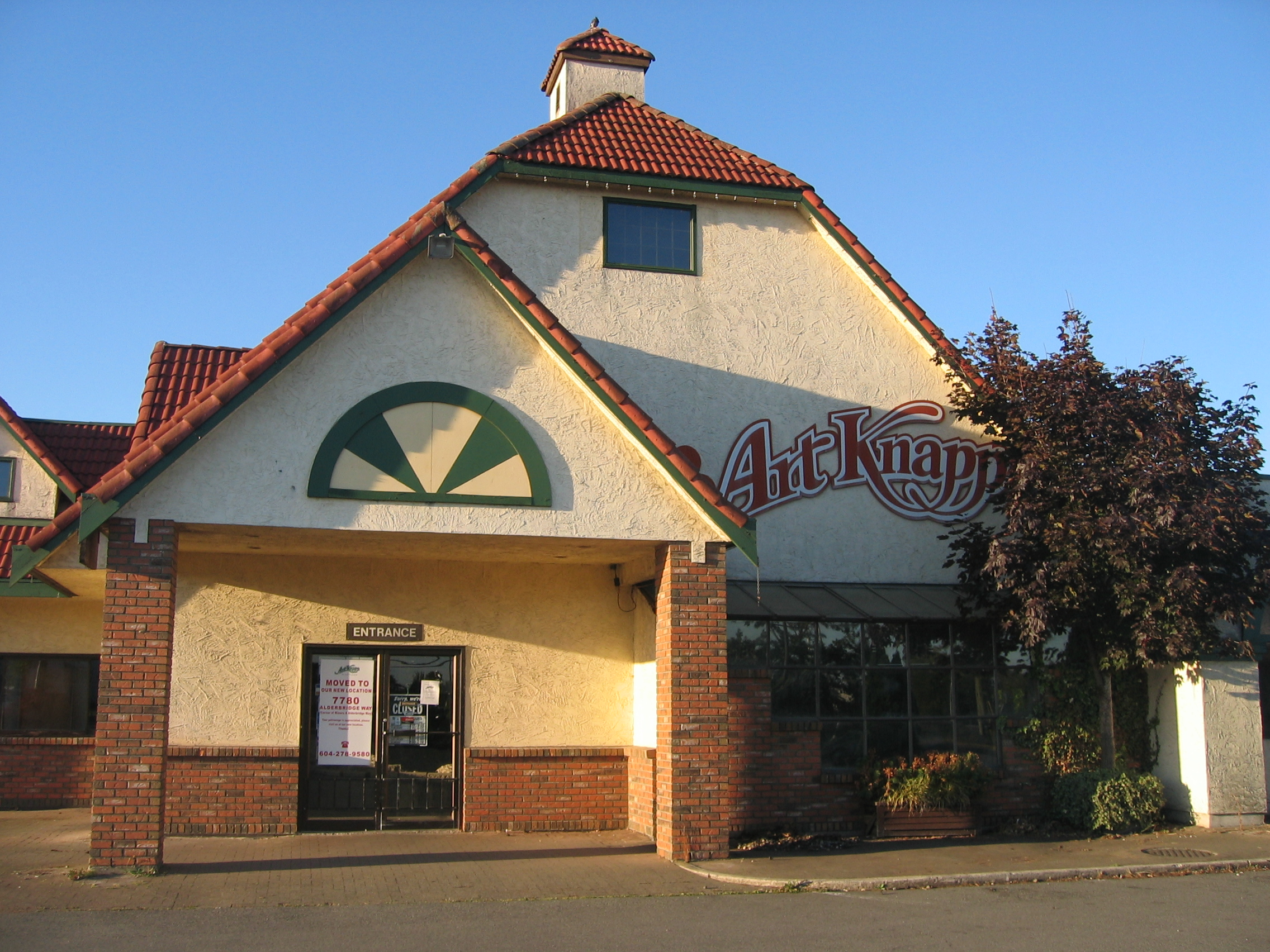
The plant store at Fantasy Gardens
