= 2013 in Canadian music =

This is a summary of the year 2013 in the Canadian music industry.

== Events ==
- January 9 – Adam Gontier, lead singer of the Canadian rock band Three Days Grace, resigns from the band, citing health concerns.
- February 5 – Silverstein releases their first album with Paul Marc Rousseau as an official member.
- March 10 – 2013 East Coast Music Awards
- April 17 – Steve Jocz, drummer for Sum 41, resigns from the band.
- April 21 – Juno Awards of 2013
- May 25 – Online streaming service CBC Music sponsors the first CBC Music Festival at Ontario Place's new Echo Beach music venue.
- June 13 – Preliminary longlist for the 2013 Polaris Music Prize is announced.
- July 10 – Mo Kenney and Keith Kouna are named the English and French winners of the 2013 SOCAN Songwriting Prize.
- July 16 – Shortlist for the Polaris Music Prize is announced.
- September 23 – Godspeed You! Black Emperor's 'Allelujah! Don't Bend! Ascend! is announced as the winner of the Polaris Music Prize.

== Bands reformed ==
- Despistado

== Albums released ==
=== A ===
- Anciients, Heart of Oak
- Arcade Fire, Reflektor – October 28
- Austra, Olympia – June 18

=== B ===
- Jason Bajada, Le résultat de mes bétises
- Alexis Baro, Blue Skin
- Jill Barber, Chansons – January 29
- The Beaches, The Beaches
- Bear Mountain, XO
- Daniel Bélanger, Chic de ville – March 5
- The Besnard Lakes, Until in Excess, Imperceptible UFO
- The Bicycles, Stop Thinking So Much
- Justin Bieber, Believe Acoustic – January 29
- Bleu Jeans Bleu, Haute couture
- Born Ruffians, Birthmarks – April 16
- T. Buckley, Northern Country Soul
- Basia Bulat, Tall Tall Shadow – September 30
- Louise Burns, The Midnight Mass – July 9

=== C ===
- Chic Gamine, Closer
- City and Colour, The Hurry and the Harm, June 4
- Classified, Classified – January 22
- The Cliks, Black Tie Elevator
- Ora Cogan, Ribbon Vine
- Corridor, Un magicien en toi
- Counterparts, The Difference Between Hell and Home – July 24
- The Courtneys, The Courtneys – June 7
- Eliana Cuevas, Espejo

=== D ===
- Thomas D'Arcy, What We Want
- The Deep Dark Woods, Jubilee
- Devours, Dignity
- DIANA, Perpetual Surrender
- Céline Dion, Loved Me Back to Life
- Marc Dupré, Nous sommes les mêmes

=== E ===
- Fred Eaglesmith, Tambourine
- Elephant Stone, Elephant Stone

=== F ===
- Stephen Fearing, Between Hurricanes
- Michael Feuerstack, Tambourine Death Bed – May 7
- Freedom Writers, Now
- Fresh Snow, I
- Front Line Assembly, Echogenetic – July 9
- Fur Trade, Don't Get Heavy

=== G ===
- Ghostkeeper, Horse Chief! War Thief!
- Grand Analog, Modern Thunder, August 20
- The Grapes of Wrath, High Road – March 19
- Jim Guthrie, Takes Time – May 7

=== H ===
- Hayden, Us Alone – February 5
- Headstones, Love + Fury – July 23
- The Hidden Cameras, Age
- Hilotrons, At Least There's Commotion – February 5
- Hollerado, White Paint
- Hooded Fang, Gravez

=== I ===
- Imaginary Cities, Fall of Romance – May 28

=== K ===
- k-os, BLack on BLonde – January 29
- Ian Kelly, All These Lines – November 5
- Koriass, Rue des Saules
- Keith Kouna, Le voyage d’hiver
- Aidan Knight, Telecommunicate
- Nicholas Krgovich, Who Cares?

=== L ===
- Mélissa Laveaux, Dying Is a Wild Night
- Avril Lavigne, Avril Lavigne
- Lee Harvey Osmond, The Folk Sinner – January 15
- Light Fires, Light Fires
- Murray Lightburn, Mass:Light
- Lightning Dust, Fantasy
- Rob Lutes, The Bravest Birds

=== M ===
- Greg MacPherson, Fireball – October 29
- Maestro Fresh Wes, Orchestrated Noise – June 25
- Magneta Lane, Witchrock – February 12
- Majical Cloudz, Impersonator – May 21
- Dylan Menzie, Heather Avenue
- Millimetrik, Remix the Rhymes
- Ruth Moody, These Wilder Things

=== N ===
- Naturally Born Strangers, The LegendsLeague Presents: Naturally Born Strangers
- New Country Rehab, Ghost of Your Charms – March 5
- The New Mendicants, Australia 2013 E.P.

=== O ===
- Odds, the Most Beautiful Place on Earth – February 21

=== P ===
- Dorothea Paas, A Thirst

=== R ===
- Corin Raymond, Paper Nickels
- Lee Reed and John P, Written Large
- Amanda Rheaume, Keep a Fire
- Daniel Romano, Come Cry With Me – January 22
- Justin Rutledge, Valleyheart – February 12

=== S ===
- The Sadies, Internal Sounds – September 17
- Sarahmée, Sans détour
- Ron Sexsmith, Forever Endeavour
- Shad, Flying Colours – October 15
- Shotgun Jimmie, Everything Everything
- Silverstein, This Is How the Wind Shifts – February 5
- Skinny Puppy, Weapon – May 28
- SNFU, Never Trouble Trouble Until Trouble Troubles You – October 24
- Rae Spoon, My Prairie Home
- The Strumbellas, We Still Move on Dance Floors – October 22
- Suuns, Images du futur
- Swollen Members, Beautiful Death Machine – March 19

=== T ===
- Tegan and Sara, Heartthrob – January 29
- Tire le coyote, Mitan
- Maylee Todd, Escapology, April 2
- A Tribe Called Red, Nation II Nation
- Two Hours Traffic, Foolish Blood

=== V ===
- Diyet van Lieshout, When You Were King
- Various Artists, Arts & Crafts: 2003–2013
- Various Artists, Arts & Crafts: X – May 28
- Leif Vollebekk, North Americana
- Lindy Vopnfjörð, Young Waverer

=== W ===
- Martha Wainwright, Trauma: Chansons de la serie tele Saison 4 – February 26
- Wake Owl, Wild Country – January 29
- Dawn Tyler Watson and Paul Deslauriers, Southland
- Whitehorse, The Road to Massey Hall – February 15
- Woodpigeon, Thumbtacks + Glue
- Donovan Woods, Don't Get Too Grand – March 26

=== Y ===
- Yamantaka // Sonic Titan, UZU
- Ken Yates, twenty-three
- Young Galaxy, Ultramarine

== Top hits on record ==
The lists are updated weekly through Nielsen Soundscan.

=== Top 10 Canadian albums ===
Rank	Artist	Album	Peak position	Sales	Certification
1	Celine Dion	Loved Me Back to Life	1	320,000	4× Platinum
2	Arcade Fire	Reflektor	1	240,000	3× Platinum
3	Johnny Reid	A Christmas Gift to You	1	160,000	2× Platinum
4	Michael Bublé	To Be Loved	1	160,000	2× Platinum
5	Drake	Nothing Was the Same	1	108,000	Platinum
6	City and Colour	The Hurry and the Harm	1	80,000	Platinum
7	Gord Bamford	Christmas in Canada	TBA	80,000	Platinum
8	Hedley	Wild Life	4	80,000	Platinum
9	Justin Bieber	Believe Acoustic	1	80,000	Platinum
10	Various Artists	MuchDance 2014	N/A	80,000	Platinum

=== Top 10 International albums ===
Rank	Artist	Album	Peak position	Sales	Certification
1	Eminem	The Marshall Mathers LP 2	1	320,000	4× Platinum
2	Various Artists	Frozen	1	240,000	3× Platinum
3	Justin Timberlake	The 20/20 Experience	1	160,000	2× Platinum
4	Katy Perry	Prism	1	160,000	2× Platinum
5	Lorde	Pure Heroine	2	160,000	2× Platinum
6	Luke Bryan	Crash My Party	1	160,000	2× Platinum
7	Avicii	True	2	80,000	Platinum
8	The Beatles	On Air – Live at the BBC Volume 2	TBA	80,000	Platinum
9	Beyoncé	Beyoncé	1	80,000	Platinum
10	Black Sabbath	13	1	80,000	Platinum

=== Top 10 singles ===
Rank	Artist	Song	Album	Peak position	Sales	Certification
1	Robin Thicke featuring T.I. and Pharrell	"Blurred Lines"	Blurred Lines	1	720,000	9× Platinum
2	Pitbull featuring Kesha	"Timber"	Meltdown	1	560,000	7× Platinum
3	Avicii	"Wake Me Up"	True	2	523,000	Platinum
4	A Great Big World	"Say Something (A Great Big World song)"	Is There Anybody Out There?	1	480,000	6× Platinum
5	Pink featuring Nate Ruess	"Just Give Me a Reason"	The Truth About Love	1	499,000	6× Platinum
6	Lorde	"Royals"	Pure Heroine	1	480,000	6× Platinum
7	OneRepublic	"Counting Stars"	Native	1	480,000	6× Platinum
8	Passenger	"Let Her Go"	All the Little Lights	5	480,000	6× Platinum
9	Pharrell Williams	"Happy"	G I R L	1	480,000	6× Platinum
10	Daft Punk featuring Pharrell Williams	"Get Lucky"	Random Access Memories	1	400,000	5× Platinum

=== Canadian Hot 100 Year-End List ===
No.	Artist(s)	Title
1	Robin Thicke featuring T.I. and Pharrell	"Blurred Lines"
2	Macklemore & Ryan Lewis featuring Wanz	"Thrift Shop"
3	Pink featuring Nate Ruess	"Just Give Me a Reason"
4	The Lumineers	"Ho Hey"
5	Rihanna featuring Mikky Ekko	"Stay"
6	Daft Punk featuring Pharrell Williams	"Get Lucky"
7	Avicii	"Wake Me Up"
8	will.i.am and Britney Spears	"Scream & Shout"
9	Imagine Dragons	"Radioactive"
10	Katy Perry	"Roar"
11	Bruno Mars	"Locked Out of Heaven"
12	Taylor Swift	"I Knew You Were Trouble"
13	Bruno Mars	"When I Was Your Man"
14	Serena Ryder	"Stompa"
15	Macklemore & Ryan Lewis featuring Ray Dalton	"Can't Hold Us"
16	Justin Timberlake	"Mirrors"
17	Classified featuring David Myles	"Inner Ninja"
18	Lorde	"Royals"
19	Armin van Buuren featuring Trevor Guthrie	"This Is What It Feels Like"
20	Pitbull featuring Christina Aguilera	"Feel This Moment"
21	Pink	"Try"
22	Maroon 5	"Daylight"
23	Swedish House Mafia featuring John Martin	"Don't You Worry Child"
24	Walk off the Earth	"Red Hands"
25	Phillip Phillips	"Home"
26	Mumford & Sons	"I Will Wait"
27	Rihanna	"Diamonds"
28	Capital Cities	"Safe and Sound"
29	Icona Pop featuring Charli XCX	"I Love It"
30	Serena Ryder	"What I Wouldn't Do"
31	Macklemore & Ryan Lewis featuring Mary Lambert	"Same Love"
32	Miley Cyrus	"We Can't Stop"
33	Miley Cyrus	"Wrecking Ball"
34	Bruno Mars	"Treasure"
35	Maroon 5	"Love Somebody"
36	Selena Gomez	"Come & Get It"
37	Justin Bieber featuring Nicki Minaj	"Beauty and a Beat"
38	Demi Lovato	"Heart Attack"
39	Anna Kendrick	"Cups"
40	Maroon 5	"One More Night"
41	Olly Murs featuring Flo Rida	"Troublemaker"
42	Drake featuring Majid Jordan	"Hold On, We're Going Home"
43	Jason Derulo	"The Other Side"
44	Alicia Keys featuring Nicki Minaj	"Girl on Fire"
45	Calvin Harris featuring Ellie Goulding	"I Need Your Love"
46	Tegan and Sara	"Closer"
47	Psy	"Gangnam Style"
48	Calvin Harris featuring Florence Welch	"Sweet Nothing"
49	Zedd featuring Foxes	"Clarity"
50	Lady Gaga	"Applause"
51	Jay-Z featuring Justin Timberlake	"Holy Grail"
52	Adele	"Skyfall"
53	fun.	"Some Nights"
54	Imagine Dragons	"Demons"
55	Kesha	"Die Young"
56	Pitbull featuring TJR	"Don't Stop the Party"
57	Tyler Shaw	"Kiss Goodnight"
58	Justin Timberlake featuring Jay-Z	"Suit & Tie"
59	Lana Del Rey and Cedric Gervais	"Summertime Sadness"
60	Eminem	"Berzerk"
61	Passenger	"Let Her Go"
62	Tegan and Sara	"I Was a Fool"
63	Flo Rida	"I Cry"
64	Kelly Clarkson	"Catch My Breath"
65	Phillip Phillips	"Gone, Gone, Gone"
66	Blake Shelton featuring Pistol Annies and friends	"Boys 'Round Here"
67	will.i.am featuring Justin Bieber	"#thatPOWER"
68	Hedley	"Anything"
69	fun.	"Carry On"
70	OneRepublic	"Counting Stars"
71	Artists Against Bullying	"True Colors"
72	Fall Out Boy	"My Songs Know What You Did in the Dark (Light Em Up)"
73	Pink featuring Lily Allen	"True Love"
74	Ne-Yo	"Let Me Love You (Until You Learn to Love Yourself)"
75	Daniel Powter	"Crazy All My Life"
76	David Guetta featuring Sia	"Titanium"
77	Metric	"Breathing Underwater"
78	Taylor Swift	"22"
79	Avril Lavigne	"Here's to Never Growing Up"
80	Darius Rucker	"Wagon Wheel"
81	Tim McGraw with Taylor Swift	"Highway Don't Care"
82	Marianas Trench	"Stutter"
83	Hedley	"Kiss You Inside Out"
84	Down with Webster	"One in a Million"
85	Kesha	"C'Mon"
86	Michael Bublé	"It's a Beautiful Day"
87	Hunter Hayes	"I Want Crazy"
88	Imagine Dragons	"It's Time"
89	Britney Spears	"Work Bitch"
90	Lady Antebellum	"Downtown"
91	Carly Rae Jepsen	"Call Me Maybe"
92	Nicki Minaj	"Va Va Voom"
93	Baauer	"Harlem Shake"
94	Kelly Clarkson	"People Like Us"
95	Blake Shelton	"Sure Be Cool If You Did"
96	Luke Bryan	"Crash My Party"
97	One Direction	"Best Song Ever"
98	Drake	"Started from the Bottom"
99	One Direction	"Little Things"
100	Taylor Swift	"We Are Never Ever Getting Back Together"

== Deaths ==
- January 7 – Kent Abbott, 32, rock musician (Grade)
- January 15 – Yuli Turovsky, 73, Russian-born conductor and cellist (I Musici de Montréal Chamber Orchestra)
- January 25 – Normand Corbeil, 56, composer
- March 6 – Stompin' Tom Connors, 77, country singer-songwriter
- April 16 – Rita MacNeil, 68, country and folk singer-songwriter
- April 17 – George Beverly Shea, 104, gospel musician
- May 5 – Greg Quill, 66, Australian-born musician and music critic for the Toronto Star
- May 8 – Bill Langstroth, 81, country music producer (Singalong Jubilee), inducted into Canadian Country Music Hall of Fame (2011).
- June 2 – Mario Bernardi, 82, conductor of the National Arts Centre Orchestra
- June 3 – Chris Levoir, 31, singer and guitarist for The Mark Inside
- August 18 – Wes Dakus, 75, rock and rockabilly musician

Preceded by 2012 in Canadian music	Canadian music 2013	Succeeded by 2014 in Canadian music
