= Surrey-White Rock-Cloverdale =

Defunct provincial electoral district in British Columbia, Canada

Surrey-White Rock-Cloverdale was a provincial electoral district of British Columbia, Canada, in 1986 only. The riding's predecessor was the Surrey riding, which first appeared in the 1966 election. Its successor ridings were Surrey-Newton, Surrey-White Rock, and Surrey-Cloverdale.

== Electoral history ==
1986 British Columbia general election
Party	Candidate	Votes	%
Social Credit	William Reid	19,200	57.45
New Democratic	Michael James Villeneuve	10,287	30.78
Liberal	Judith Higginbotham	3,791	11.34
Independent	Hartl Dietmar	144	0.43
Total valid votes		33,422	98.80
Total rejected ballots		373	1.10
Turnout		33,795	80.16
Registered voters		42,160	
Source: Canadian Elections Database

The population boom in Surrey saw Surrey further redistributed after 1986.

== See also ==
- List of British Columbia provincial electoral districts
- Canadian provincial electoral districts
- Vancouver (electoral districts)

== Sources ==
- Elections BC Historical Returns
