= Surrey (electoral district) =

Defunct provincial electoral district in British Columbia, Canada

Surrey was a provincial electoral district of British Columbia, Canada, from 1966 to 1983. The area it covered was formerly part of the electoral district of Delta. It returned one member to the Legislative Assembly of BC from 1966 to 1975 and two members thereafter. It was abolished prior to the 1986 election into Surrey-Guildford-Whalley, Surrey-Newton, and Surrey-White Rock-Cloverdale.

== Notable MLAs ==
- Bill Vander Zalm
- Rita Johnston

== Electoral history ==
Surrey elected members to the Legislative Assembly of British Columbia from 1966 to 1983. The members it elected were:

28th British Columbia election, 1966
Party	Candidate	Votes	%	±	Expenditures
New Democratic	Ernest Hall	7,039	48.20%		unknown
Social Credit	Roderick Anthony Archer	6,254	42.82%	–	unknown
Liberal	Renaldo Angelo Masi	1,234	8.45%		unknown
Communist	Jean Maryl MacLaren	77	0.53%		unknown
Total valid votes		14,604	100.00%		
Total rejected ballots		119			
Turnout		%			

29th British Columbia election, 1969
Party	Candidate	Votes	%	±	Expenditures
New Democrat	Ernest Hall	9,398	47.23%		unknown
Social Credit	Anthony (Tony) Hatcher	8,921	44.83%	–	unknown
Liberal	Robert Jacobs	1,581	7.94%		unknown
Total valid votes		19,900	100.00%		
Total rejected ballots		223			
Turnout		%			

30th British Columbia election, 1972
Party	Candidate	Votes	%	±	Expenditures
New Democratic	Ernest Hall	12,574	52.49%		unknown
Social Credit	James B. Wallace	5,877	24.53%	–	unknown
Liberal	William Nick (Bill) Vander Zalm	3,995	16.68%		unknown
Progressive Conservative	William Earl (Bill) Reid	1,415	5.91%		unknown
Communist	Frederick Joseph Bianco	95	0.40%		unknown
Total valid votes		23,956	100.00%		
Total rejected ballots		395			
Turnout		%			

31st British Columbia election, 1975
Party	Candidate	Votes	%	±	Expenditures
Social Credit	William Nick (Bill) Vander Zalm	14,341	53.35%	–	unknown
New Democratic	Ernest Hall	11,214	41.72%		unknown
Liberal	Donald Alvin Ross	1,257	4.68%		unknown
Communist	Frederick Joseph Bianco	67	0.25%		unknown
Total valid votes		26,879	100.00%		
Total rejected ballots		386			
Turnout		%			

32nd British Columbia election, 1979 ^{1}
Party	Candidate	Votes	%	±	Expenditures
Social Credit	William Nick (Bill) Vander Zalm	29,693	24.88%	–	unknown
New Democratic	Ernest Hall	28,644	24.00%		unknown
New Democratic	Michael Garry Watkins	28,497	23.87%		unknown
Social Credit	Dalton O. Jones	26,306	22.04%	–	unknown
Progressive Conservative	Brian Kent Westwood	5,834	4.89%		unknown
Communist	Timothy George Gidora	204	0.17%		unknown
Communist	Josephine P. Arland	183	0.15%		unknown
Total valid votes		119,361	100.00%		
Total rejected ballots		1,368			
Turnout		%			
^{1} Seat increased to two members from one.

33rd British Columbia election, 1983
Party	Candidate	Votes	%	±	Expenditures
Social Credit	Rita Margaret Johnston	38,081	25.24%	–	unknown
Social Credit	William Earl (Bill) Reid	37,370	24.76%	–	unknown
New Democratic	Ernest Hall	34,082	22.59%		unknown
New Democratic	Carol Langford	32,748	21.70%		unknown
Progressive Conservative	Frank Nelson Wright	2,531	1.68%		unknown
Liberal	Judith E. Higginbotham	1,673	1.11%		unknown
Liberal	Donald Peter McKinnon	1,651	1.09%		unknown
Western Canada Concept	David J. Bannister	1,181	1.25%		unknown
Green	Jack Boulogne	692	0.46%	–	unknown
Communist	Viola Swann	185	0.12%		unknown
Total valid votes		150,894	100.00%		
Total rejected ballots		1,018			
Turnout		%			

The riding was reconstituted into three ridings for the 1986 election: Surrey-Newton, Surrey-Guildford-Whalley, and Surrey-White Rock-Cloverdale. These were later reconstituted into the following ridings:

- Surrey-Newton
  - Surrey-Panorama Ridge
  - Surrey-Tynehead
- Surrey-Guildford-Whalley
  - Surrey-Green Timbers
  - Surrey-Whalley
- Surrey-White Rock-Cloverdale
  - Surrey-White Rock
  - Surrey-Cloverdale

== See also ==
- Vancouver (electoral districts)
- List of British Columbia provincial electoral districts
- Canadian provincial electoral districts
