= Vince Carlin =

Vincent A. Carlin is a retired Canadian journalist. He was the ombudsman of the Canadian Broadcasting Corporation from January 2006 to December 2010, serving a five-year term with the corporation. Carlin has since been succeeded by Mr. Kirk Lapointe and Esther Enkin.

Carlin was born in the United States. He graduated from Georgetown University's School of Foreign Service. He began his journalism career in 1965 initially at New York City, then at Washington. In 1970, he moved to Montreal as Bureau Chief of the Time-Life News Service. In 1973 joined the CBC, first as host of CBC Radio's Daybreak. Over the years he moved on to various positions in both radio and television, at various times serving as Head of Television News, Managing Editor of Radio News and head of the CBC's 24hour news channel, Newsworld (now called CBC News Network).

In the late 90s, he was appointed Associate Professor and Chair of Ryerson University's School of Journalism, a position he held for 7 years, before returning to the CBC as Ombudsman.

Upon retiring, he launched another career, as a full-time actor, an avocation over many years. Since 2011, Carlin has appeared in a variety of theatre presentations in the Toronto area, as well as film and TV. He also runs his own theatre production company, Act of Faith Productions (aofproductions.ca),

He is married to Kathleen Carlin (née Mackesy), PhD who teaches in the Philosophy Department at Toronto Metropolitan University (formerly Ryerson). They have six children and 14 grandchildren.
