= Robin Harrison (pianist) =

Robin Keith Harrison (July 28, 1932 – May 19, 2013) was a British-born Canadian musician. Known as a composer and pianist, he served for over 20 years as head of the piano division at the University of Saskatchewan. He recorded several classical music albums, including three solo albums, and was a repeat guest performer with the Saskatoon Symphony Orchestra.

== Music career ==
Harrison was born in North London in 1932 to a city engineer and a homemaker. As a child, he sought out neighbours' pianos to play, by peeking in windows and then requesting to come in and play. At age eight his parents finally bought him a piano of his own, and he started lessons. From age ten he performed publicly, and in 1949 he won teenage talent of the year in a London competition in which he played Piano Sonata No. 32 by Beethoven. He was invited to perform multiple times on BBC's Children's Hour.

A scholarship to the Royal Academy of Music allowed him to study with pianist Harold Craxton. He also studied with Carlo Zecchi in Rome and Salzburg, and Ilona Kabos in London. In the late 1960s, despite having a full schedule teaching and performing in Britain, he took the position at the University of Saskatchewan in order to have a more secure job, and moved with his wife and four children to Saskatoon, Canada. He taught piano, the history of opera, and a particularly popular class, music appreciation.

He continued performing as well, and in 1984 gave a solo performance at Carnegie Hall. He also accepted multiple invitations to perform on CBC Radio broadcasts. His compositions included a Bagatelle for piano, and music to poems by Christina Rossetti.

== Personal life ==
He had four children with his first wife, Eva, who died of cancer in 1977. His second wife, Marilyn, had five children herself, and at one point they had eight children living with them. Following his retirement from the university in 1994, he and Marilyn moved to Margaree Forks, Nova Scotia, and he continued with some teaching and performing. He moved in 2008 to British Columbia to be close to piano teacher Rachel Anderson, and she became his third wife when they married in 2011. He and Anderson performed piano duets at concerts in western Canada and the US.

He died in Burnaby, British Columbia, following a heart attack, age 80, on May 19, 2013.
