= Dave Lyon (track coach) =

David Murray Lyon (November 22, 1938 – May 9, 2013) was a Canadian Olympic track and field coach.
