= Robert R. Taylor (photographer) =

Canadian photographer (1940–2013)

Robert Ross Taylor
- Born: June 16, 1940
- Died: August 15, 2013 (aged 73); Winnipeg, Manitoba
- Known for: photographer

Robert Ross Taylor RCA (June 16, 1940 – August 15, 2013), also known as Bob Taylor, was a Canadian wildlife photographer. He was known for his images of polar bears, great grey owls and bison.

== Life and work ==
Taylor was born June 16, 1940, and grew up in the Toronto area. He earned a degree in 1963 from Ryerson Polytechnical Institute with a major in science photography.

Taylor began his career working with government agencies, museums and universities, first in Saskatchewan and then in Manitoba. Eventually he went out on his own, working as an independent photographer for the remainder of his career. His photographs were published in numerous magazines including LIFE, Canadian Geographic, and Reader's Digest. He published several books, focusing on his work in nature photography. Taylor was also involved in the production of several films, mostly documentary shorts of nature subjects.

I chose to pursue a career of making others aware of their surroundings and helping them to stop and enjoy the beauties of nature. I hoped that if people came to appreciate their environment more, we would become better stewards and want to find ways to live harmoniously with our various ecosystems.

— Robert R. Taylor

Taylor travelled widely and was actively involved in arranging and leading trips so that others could experience photographing wildlife. Some credit his photography for encouraging interest in the destination of Churchill, Manitoba, to view the annual polar bear migration.

Taylor was an accomplished carver who helped launch the Prairie Canada Carvers Association.

== Books ==
- The Edge of the Arctic: Churchill and the Hudson Bay Lowlands Winnipeg, Manitoba: Windemere House Publishing, 1992 ISBN 978-1550561852
- The Manitoba Landscape-A Visual Symphony Altona, Manitoba: D. W. Friesen Sons, Limited, 1993 ISBN 978-1550560213
- The Great Gray Owl: On Silent Wings Winnipeg, Manitoba: Windemere House Publishing, 1997 ISBN 978-1550565027
- Manitoba: Seasons of Beauty Winnipeg, Manitoba: Windemere House Publishing, 2002. ISBN 978-1550568998

== Awards ==
- Bronze Award, Columbus Film Festival for Assiniboine Forest
- Award for Creative Excellence, U.S. Industrial Film Festival, for Prairie Insights

== Honours ==
- Order of the Buffalo Hunt, Government of Manitoba
- Royal Canadian Academy of Arts
- Master of Photographic Arts, Professional Photographers of Canada
- Fellowship, Professional Photographers Association of Manitoba
