= William Earl Reid =

Canadian politician (1934–2013)

Member of the British Columbia Legislative Assembly for Surrey-White Rock-Cloverdale Surrey (1983-1986)
- In office May 5, 1983 – October 17, 1991 Serving with Rita Johnston (1983-1986)
- Preceded by: Bill Vander Zalm
- Succeeded by: Riding Abolished

Minister of Tourism
- In office August 14, 1986 – September 22, 1989
- Premier: Bill Vander Zalm
- Preceded by: Claude Richmond
- Succeeded by: Claude Richmond

Delta Alderman
- In office 1973–1978

Personal details
- Born: August 13, 1934 Nelson, British Columbia
- Died: May 29, 2013 (aged 78)
- Party: Social Credit
- Occupation: municipal and provincial politician
- Profession: politician

William Earl "Bill" Reid (August 13, 1934 – May 28, 2013) was a Canadian politician. He was a political figure in British Columbia, Canada known locally as "Mr. Surrey". He represented Surrey from 1983 to 1986 and Surrey-White Rock-Cloverdale from 1986 to 1991 in the Legislative Assembly of British Columbia as a Social Credit member. "That was the best job I ever had in my whole life," said Reid. "I was the Minister of Tourism from '86 to '91, when Expo 86 was on and we had the best place in the world to visit."

== Early years ==
Reid was born in Nelson, British Columbia, the son of William Earl Reid and Dolly Renwick, and was educated in Chilliwack. Prior to politics, he owned and operated a car dealership in Surrey.

== Local politics ==
He served as an alderman for Delta from 1973 to 1978. Reid also was chairman of the board for the Metro Transit Authority.

== Provincial politics ==
Reid ran in the 1972 provincial elections as a Progressive Conservative candidate for Surrey, but did not win. He later joined the Social Credit Party and won in the Surrey riding in 1983. With only one riding, Reid was responsible for the entire city of Surrey at that time. Reid served as government whip in the provincial assembly. Reid also served in the provincial cabinet as Minister of Tourism, a position that had an especially high-profile during Expo 86. He also served in 1988 and 1989 as the Provincial Secretary of British Columbia.

== Final decades and legacy ==
Reid retired from provincial politics in 1991 and devoted the remainder of his life to his community.

In 2012, Reid was awarded the Queen's Diamond Jubilee award, which was given to Canadians who have made significant contributions to their communities.

The City of Surrey named him Good Citizen of the Year in 2013 due to 50 years of community service including work with societies such as Cloverdale Chamber of Commerce, Surrey Spirit of B.C. committee, Surrey Heritage Society and Cloverdale Rodeo and Exhibition Association. Bill Reid Place, a transitional shelter was constructed in Cloverdale.

Reid died at the age of 78 on May 28, 2013, from a rare cancer.

In 2014, the city planned three legacy projects:

- renaming Cloverdale Millennium Amphitheatre to Bill Reid Millennium Amphitheatre
- naming a portion 62nd Avenue as Bill Reid Way
- a public sculpture (estimated cost $70,000) by artist Paul Slipper.
