= Brian Huggins =

British-Canadian actor and journalist

- Born: 30 August 1931; Leicester, Leicestershire, England
- Died: 29 March 2013 (aged 81); Dartmouth, Nova Scotia, Canada
- Occupation(s): Journalist, writer, actor

Brian Edgar Huggins (30 August 1931 – 29 March 2013) was a British-Canadian journalist and actor.

== Biography ==
Brian Huggins, born August 30, 1931, in Leicester, Leicestershire, England. He started his career in journalism at the Leicester Evening Mail. His work then took him to London, England, where he worked on Fleet St., before moving to Canada at age 25. He worked for The Newspaper Guild in Montreal, and as a journalist with the CBC in Toronto and Ottawa. He was the candidate in the 1963 general elections for the New Democratic Party of Canada in the riding of Ottawa West. In the 1970s he was a broadcast journalist for CBC Ottawa; lived in Paris (1974-75) where he was a freelance writer; and returned to Ottawa where he worked as a Member's Secretary on Parliament Hill, before he joined the Civil Service to work in public relations, a writer and editor for Statistics Canada. He also worked for the Canadian Union of Public Employees.

Following his retirement from journalism and the public service, he took up acting. As a background or character actor he played many small roles in both television and movies filmed for the most part on Canada's East Coast. He is best known for his portrayal of "Shitty" Bill in the hit Canadian mockumentary series Trailer Park Boys.

== Personal life ==
Born to parents Beatrice Pye and Charles Huggins, Brian Huggins was raised in Leicester with his younger sister Joan. Brian Huggins later moved to London to pursue his career in journalism which he had started at the Leicester Evening Mail. After emigrating to Canada, Huggins lived in Montreal, Toronto, and Ottawa. He married Catherine Costello (1943-1984), with whom he had two children, son Paul Charles (b.1967 Montréal) and daughter Piper Elizabeth (b.1969 Ottawa). Once retired, he moved to Nova Scotia, where he divided his time between Chester and Dartmouth. He also spent a good part of the year in his native England, later settling in Hailsham, South of London.

Brian Huggins was a member of the Ottawa Press Club, Canadian Union of Public Employees, Royal St George's Society of Halifax, Chester Yacht Club, Royal Over-Seas League, Alliance of Canadian Cinema, Television and Radio Artists, and the New Democratic Party.

== Death ==
Huggins died on 29 March 2013 in Dartmouth, Nova Scotia, Canada, at the Dartmouth General Hospital. Cause of death is unconfirmed by an autopsy report; clinical prognosis: rapid degenerative brain decease that presented first as Aphasia.
