= Tan Yu =

Chinese businessman (1927–2002)

- 鄭周敏
- Born: 5 April 1927; Shishi, Chinchew, Fukien, China
- Died: 12 March 2002 (aged 74); Houston, Texas, United States
- Citizenship: Filipino

Tan Yu (Chinese: 鄭周敏; Pe̍h-ōe-jī: Tīⁿ Chiu-bín; pinyin: Zhèng Zhōumǐn; 5 April 1927 – 12 March 2002) was a Chinese-Filipino philanthropist and businessman who founded the Asiaworld Internationale Group and established the KTTI Foundation, which provided scholarships to and supported the education of thousands of young students. In 1997, Forbes listed Tan Yu as the 7th wealthiest person in the world, estimating his net worth to be about $7 billion. He was placed amongst the top 10 in the world on the Forbes List of World Billionaires 1997, making him the wealthiest man in the Philippines.

== Early life ==
Originally from Fujian province in China, Yu and his family moved to the Philippines at a young age. He began making a living in the province of Camarines Norte through selling bread buns in the streets and doing some fishing. He graduated from University of St. La Salle in Bacolod, and in 1997, received an honorary doctorate of science degree from the New Jersey Institute of Technology. By the age of 18, he had established a successful textile business.

Tan Yu's early success in the textile industry laid the foundation for his future business empire. His ability to identify market opportunities and his entrepreneurial spirit were evident from a young age, traits that would define his career.

== Business career ==
During his lifetime, he planned to develop his private islands Fuga and Barit, two of the northernmost islands in the Philippines, into a resort in the Pacific for businessmen and tourists. Under the company Asiaworld, he possessed more land in the Philippines than the government, as well as possessing overseas assets in the form of property, hotels and banks.

His key holdings included the Asiaworld Plaza Hotel in Taiwan, which became a landmark property in the country, over 200 Hectares of prime land in Manila Bay and the Islands of Fuga and Barit.

Tan Yu's business interests were diverse, spanning real estate, hospitality, banking, and agriculture. His Asiaworld Internationale Group became a conglomerate with significant influence in the Asian business landscape. Some of his notable achievements include the establishment of Asiaworld Group of Companies, which had interests in real estate, hotels, and banking across Asia.

Tan Yu was known for his shrewd business acumen and his ability to spot lucrative investment opportunities. His business philosophy emphasized diversification and long-term growth strategies.

== Philanthropy ==
In addition to his business ventures, Tan Yu was renowned for his philanthropic efforts. The KTTI Foundation, which he established, provided scholarships and educational support to thousands of young students in the Philippines. His commitment to education stemmed from his belief in its power to transform lives and communities.

Tan Yu's philanthropic work extended beyond education. He was known to support various charitable causes and community development projects in the Philippines and other parts of Asia.

== Personal life and death ==
Tan Yu died of heart failure in Houston, Texas, in 2002 at the age of 74. Jose de Venecia, the Speaker of the House of Representatives in the Philippines, commended his achievements as a great businessman and as a philanthropist, for providing jobs to a number of Philippine people. He was posthumously honored with the Dr. Jose P. Rizal Award for Excellence.

His children continue to live in the Philippines, Taiwan, Hong Kong and the US.
