= The Mark Inside =

Defunct Canadian rock band

- Origin: Whitby, Ontario, Canada
- Genres: Indie rock Garage rock revival
- Years active: 2000–2013
- Labels: MapleMusic; Metal Box
- Members: Geoff Bennett; Gus Harris; Reade Ollivier
- Past members: Chris Levoir; Geordie Dynes
- Website: The Mark Inside

The Mark Inside was a four-piece rock band from Whitby, Ontario, based out of Toronto.

== History ==
The Mark Inside was formed in early 2000 by four friends who attended the same high school. After practising together and performing locally for about three years, the band released their debut album Static/Crash themselves on their own record label Vampire Dance. It was recorded in three separate sessions, two produced by Thom D'Arcy, and one session by the band themselves. The album was picked up and re-released by MapleMusic Recordings. The album was remixed by Ian Blurton. Two singles, "Carousel" and "Sweet Little Sister", achieved underground and mainstream success garnering attention on mainstream radio and regular rotation on MuchMusic during 2004 and 2005.

The band portrayed themselves on Ken Finkleman's CBC mini-series At The Hotel in episode 3 of the show, opposite Don McKellar who played their manager. A performance of "Sweet Little Sister" was spliced throughout. Following the re-release of the record nationally, The Mark Inside toured with C'mon and Magneta Lane across Canada a number of times, including a performance at Toronto's NXNE festival.

In 2007, the band released a single, "Circling The Drain" b/w "Liar", on the Toronto singles-only label Magnificent Sevens while waiting to get on with their second full-length. The band traveled to England in 2008 and recorded their second album with producer Jim Abbiss, after parting company with their former label MapleMusic. Abbiss offered to bring the band over to Chapel Studios in Lincolnshire, England, where the TMI recorded with Abbiss and sound engineer Ewan Davies for a month in the converted 1700s chapel. Shortly afterwards the band signed with Abbiss' label, MetalBox Recordings.

In late 2009, Geordie Dynes, drummer and founding member of the band left for other pursuits. Dynes currently plays for By Divine Right. After his departure, Reade Ollivier was brought in on drums.

On October 26, 2010, the band released a 12" EP, False Flag. Their second album Nothing to Admit was released on November 1, 2011, on vinyl and by digital download.

Singer and guitarist Chris Levoir (born 1981) died in Toronto over the weekend of June 1, 2013. No cause of death has been released. At a celebration of his life, the band premiered their new video for the song "Don't Wake Daniel", filmed by David Waldman. Shortly after, the band's third album, Dark Hearts Can Radiate White Light, was released.

The three remaining members of The Mark Inside continued to play together, and in 2014, calling themselves Old Code, they released a 5 track EP.

== Discography ==
=== Albums ===
- Static/Crash
- Nothing to Admit
- Dark Hearts Can Radiate White Light

=== Singles ===
Year	Song	Chart peak	Album
Year	Song	CAN Alt	Album
2011	"The Bottom Line"	31	Nothing to Admit
"—" denotes a release that did not chart.

== Members ==
Current members

- Geoff Bennett – guitar, bass, and vocals (2000–present)
- Gus Harris – guitar, bass (2000–present)
- Reade Ollivier - drums (2010–present)

Former members

- Chris Levoir – guitar, vocals (2000–2013; died 2013)
- Geordie Dynes - drums (2000–2010)
