= 1924–25 Dumbarton F.C. season =

Dumbarton
1924–1925 season
- Manager: Donald Colman
- Stadium: Boghead Park, Dumbarton
- Scottish League Division Two: 8th
- Scottish Cup: Second Round
- Top goalscorer: League: James Carlow (14); All: James Carlow (15)
Home colours

The 1924–25 season was the 48th Scottish football season in which Dumbarton competed at national level, entering the Scottish Football League and the Scottish Cup. In addition Dumbarton played in the Dumbartonshire Cup and the Dumbartonshire Charity Cup.

== Scottish League ==
Dumbarton's third consecutive season in the Second Division began well with just 4 losses in the first 20 games, and at the turn of the year were a point off the top of the league. However any hopes for promotion were dashed by winning only one of the subsequent 8 games and despite a mini revival in February–March, in the end Dumbarton had to settle for 8th place out of 20, with 40 points - 10 behind champions Dundee United.

16 August 1924 League	Dumbarton	1–1	King's Park	Boghead Park
	Hyslop 17'		Dodds 15'	Attendance: 1,500; Referee: W Gray

23 August 1924 League	East Stirling	2–2	Dumbarton	Firs Park
	Stoddart 13'; McKechnie 30'		Kennedy 10', 40'	Attendance: 3,000; Referee: W Gray

30 August 1924 League	Dumbarton	3–3	Dundee United	Boghead Park
	Kennedy 20'; Russell 43'; Carlow 50' (pen.)		Oswald 15'; O'Kane 55', 60'	Attendance: 3,000; Referee: A Leishman

1 September 1924 League	Dumbarton	1–1	East Stirling	Boghead Park
	Carlow 46' (pen.)		Kelly 5'	Attendance: 2,000; Referee: J Sinclair

6 September 1924 League	Dumbarton	2–0	Forfar Athletic	Boghead Park
	Broadley 5' (pen.); Love 75'			Attendance: 2,000; Referee: J Aitken

13 September 1924 League	East Fife	2–1	Dumbarton	Bayview Park, Methil
	Weir; Duncan		Kennedy	Attendance: 4,500; Referee: R Innes

20 September 1924 League	Dumbarton	2–0	Arthurlie	Boghead Park
	McLardie; Kennedy			Attendance: 2,500; Referee: J Kilbride

27 September 1924 League	Arbroath	0–0	Dumbarton	Gayfield Park
				Attendance: 3,500; Referee: A Martin

4 October 1924 League	Dumbarton	2–1	Johnstone	Boghead Park
	Kennedy 44'; Carlow 46'		Merrie 18'	Attendance: 2,000; Referee: J Kennedy

11 October 1924 League	St Bernard's	2–1	Dumbarton	Tynecastle Stadium
	Young		Kennedy 49'	Attendance: 3,000; Referee: J Divers

18 October 1924 League	Stenhousemuir	1–1	Dumbarton	Ochilview Park
	Jarvie (pen.)		Carlow 16'	Attendance: 1,200; Referee: G Robertson

25 October 1924 League	Dumbarton	2–0	Dunfermline Athletic	Boghead Park
	Mair; Russell			Attendance: 2,000; Referee: A Leishman

1 November 1924 League	Bathgate	1–0	Dumbarton	Mill Park, Bathgate
	Robertson 65'			Attendance: 2,000; Referee: J Divers

8 November 1924 League	Dumbarton	1–0	Clydebank	Boghead Park
	McLardie 12'			Attendance: 5,000

15 November 1924 League	Clyde	3–2	Dumbarton	Shawfield Stadium
	Hood 5'; Johnston; McFadyen		Carlow	Attendance: 6,000

22 November 1924 League	Dumbarton	2–0	Albion Rovers	Boghead Park
	Carlow 15'; Cameron 82'			Attendance: 2,000; Referee: J Kilbride

29 November 1924 League	Broxburn United	1–2	Dumbarton	Sports Park, Broxburn
	Cheetham		Cameron; McLardie	Attendance: 1,500; Referee: J Divers

6 December 1924 League	Dumbarton	1–0	Bo'ness	Boghead Park
	Carlow 55'			Attendance: 2,000; Referee: R Innes

13 December 1924 League	Armadale	0–2	Dumbarton	Volunteer Park, Armadale
			Kennedy; Russell	Referee: W Addison

20 December 1924 League	Dumbarton	1–1	Alloa Athletic	Boghead Park
	Kennedy 47'		Loney 52'	Attendance: 3,000

27 December 1924 League	Forfar Athletic	3–1	Dumbarton	Station Park, Forfar
	Cornock (pen.) 75'		Carlow	Referee: A Leishman

1 January 1925 League	Clydebank	1–0	Dumbarton	Clydeholm Park
	Anderson 30'

3 January 1925 League	Dumbarton	2–1	East Fife	Boghead Park
	McLardie		Hunter 12'	Attendance: 2,000; Referee: W Addison

5 January 1925 League	Arthurlie	2–1	Dumbarton	Dunterlie Park
	Boland; Agnew		Carlow	Attendance: 1,500

10 January 1925 League	King's Park	3–1	Dumbarton	Forthbank Park
	Abrines 20'; Martin		Kennedy	Referee: W Gray

17 January 1925 League	Dumbarton	0–1	Broxburn United	Boghead Park
			Walker 75'	Attendance: 2,000; Referee: A Leishman

31 January 1925 League	Dundee United	0–0	Dumbarton	Tannadice Park
				Attendance: 7,000; Referee: J Kennedy

11 February 1925 League	Dumbarton	0–1	St Bernard's	Boghead Park
			Alston 20'

14 February 1925 League	Dunfermline Athletic	1–2	Dumbarton	East End Park
	Skinner		Russell 10'; McKenzie 15'	Attendance: 600; Referee: W Gray

21 February 1925 League	Dumbarton	1–0	Bathgate	Boghead Park
	Cameron 75'			Attendance: 2,000; Referee: C Bilney

28 February 1925 League	Johnstone	0–1	Dumbarton	Newfield Park, Johnstone
			Cameron 44'

7 March 1925 League	Bo'ness	1–1	Dumbarton	Newtown Park, Bo'ness
	Martin 20'		Russell 89'	Attendance: 2,000; Referee: M McMilligan

14 March 1925 League	Dumbarton	3–2	Stenhousemuir	Boghead Park
	Carlow		Allison; Cunningham	Attendance: 2,000; Referee: J Kennedy

21 March 1925 League	Dumbarton	1–0	Armadale	Boghead Park
	Carlow 20'			Attendance: 2,000; Referee: F Galloway

28 March 1925 League	Alloa Athletic	2–1	Dumbarton	Recreation Park, Alloa
	Merrie; Mason		Kennedy	Attendance: 8,000; Referee: A Leishman

4 April 1925 League	Dumbarton	0–0	Arbroath	Boghead Park
				Attendance: 1,000; Referee: J Kilbride

11 April 1925 League	Albion Rovers	3–1	Dumbarton	Cliftonhill
	Cameron; Brant; Liddell 80'		Kennedy 65'	Attendance: 2,000; Referee: A Leishman

25 April 1925 League	Dumbarton	0–4	Clyde	Boghead Park
			Johnston 25' 55'	Attendance: 3,000

== Scottish Cup ==
Dumbarton reached the second round before being knocked out by First Division Falkirk.

24 January 1925 Cup R1	Newton Stewart	0–2	Dumbarton	Holm Park, Newton Stewart
			Russell; Broadley (pen.)	Attendance: 10,000; Referee: D Lees

7 February 1925 Cup R2	Falkirk	2–0	Dumbarton	Brockville Park
	Campbell 30'; Scott 75' (pen.)			Attendance: 9,000; Referee: R Innes

== Dumbartonshire Cup ==
Dumbarton lost to Helensburgh in the county cup final.

27 August 1924 Semi Final	Dumbarton	3–1	Clydebank	Boghead Park
	Love; Broadley (pen.); Brooke		Warden (OG)	Attendance: 2,000

29 April 1925 Final	Dumbarton	0–1	Helensburgh	Boghead Park
			Kesson 10'	Attendance: 1,500

== Dumbartonshire Charity Cup ==
Dumbarton finished as runners-up losing out to Clydebank in the final.

9 May 1925 Semi Final	Helensburgh	0–1	Dumbarton	Helensburgh
			Carlow	Referee: N McMilligan

16 May 1925 Final	Dumbarton	0–2	Clydebank	Boghead Park
			Fleming 11'; Houston	Attendance: 2,000; Referee: N McMillan

== Player statistics ==
=== Squad ===
No.	Pos	Nat	Player	Total		Second Division		Scottish Cup	
No.	Pos	Nat	Player	Apps	Goals	Apps	Goals	Apps	Goals
	GK	(Scotland) SCO	Albert Ferguson	40	0	38	0	2	0
	DF	(Scotland) SCO	William Gibson	39	0	37	0	2	0
	DF	(Scotland) SCO	James Warden	40	0	38	0	2	0
	MF	(Scotland) SCO	Beattie	2	0	2	0	0	0
	MF	(Scotland) SCO	David Broadley	33	2	31	1	2	1
	MF	(Scotland) SCO	William Hyslop	15	1	15	1	0	0
	MF	(Scotland) SCO	Robert Jones	25	0	23	0	2	0
	MF	(Scotland) SCO	Andrew Mair	40	1	38	1	2	0
	FW	(Scotland) SCO	Thomas Brooks	3	0	3	0	0	0
	FW	(Scotland) SCO	Ronald Cameron	22	4	22	4	0	0
	FW	(Scotland) SCO	Francis Carlow	29	15	27	14	2	1
	FW	(Scotland) SCO	Robert Dennett	5	0	5	0	0	0
	FW	(Scotland) SCO	Philip Kennedy	40	12	38	12	2	0
	FW	(Scotland) SCO	Thomas Love	15	1	13	1	2	0
	FW	(Scotland) SCO	Colin McKenzie	13	1	13	1	0	0
	FW	(Scotland) SCO	Archibald McLardie	34	5	32	5	2	0
	FW	(Scotland) SCO	Billy Middleton	6	0	6	0	0	0
	FW	(Scotland) SCO	John Russell	38	6	36	5	2	1
	FW	(Scotland) SCO	Trialist	1	0	1	0	0	0

=== Transfers ===
==== Players in ====
Player	From	Date
(Scotland) David Broadley	(Scotland) Petershill	2 Jun 1924
(Scotland) Thomas Brooks	(Scotland) Dumbarton Harp	6 Jun 1924
(Scotland) Colin McKenzie	(Scotland) Dumbarton Harp	14 Jun 1924
(Scotland) Albert Ferguson	(Scotland) Partick Thistle	7 Aug 1924
(Scotland) William Gibson	(Scotland) Morton	8 Aug 1924
(Scotland) James Warden	(Scotland) Renfrew	13 Aug 1924
(Scotland) John Russell	(Scotland) Airdrie	15 Aug 1924
(Scotland) Archibald McLardie	(Scotland) Vale of Leven	30 Aug 1924
(Scotland) William Middleton	(England) Brighton	25 Sep 1924
(Scotland) Robert Jones	(Scotland) Celtic (loan)	13 Oct 1924
(Scotland) Ronald Cameron	(Scotland) Morton	7 Nov 1924
(Scotland) Robert Dennett	(Scotland) Paisley Juniors	13 Jan 1925

==== Players out ====
Player	To	Date
(Scotland) Norman Thomson	(Scotland) Hibernian	24 Jun 1924
(Scotland) Joseph Bell	(England) Clapton Orient	8 Jul 1924
(Scotland) Henry Loney	(Scotland) Alloa Athletic	21 Jul 1924
(Scotland) James Stalker	(Scotland) Alloa Athletic	28 Jul 1924
(Scotland) Alex Jackson	(Scotland) Aberdeen	8 Aug 1924
(Scotland) Andrew Miller	(England) Notts Forest	9 Aug 1924
(Scotland) Thomas Brooks	(Scotland) Vale of Leven	18 Feb 1925
(Scotland) Andrew Chalmers	(Scotland) Dumbarton Harp	

In addition Arthur King and Robert Robertson played their last games in Dumbarton 'colours'.
