= 1923–24 Dumbarton F.C. season =

Dumbarton
1923–1924 season
- Manager: Donald Colman
- Stadium: Boghead Park, Dumbarton
- Scottish League Division Two: 10th
- Scottish Cup: First Round
- Top goalscorer: League: Carlow/ Love/ Stalker (9); All: Stalker (10)
Home colours

The 1923–24 season was the 47th Scottish football season in which Dumbarton competed at national level, entering the Scottish Football League and the Scottish Cup. In addition Dumbarton played in the Dumbartonshire Cup.

== Scottish League ==
With a second successive season in the Second Division, Dumbarton looked to push once more for a promotion place but by the turn of the year they were languishing in 17th place and threatened with relegation to the Third Division. Nevertheless, an unbeaten 10 match run took them to 7th - but a promotion was never a reality and a 10th-place finish was achieved, out of 20, with 39 points - 17 behind champions St Johnstone

18 August 1923 League	Dumbarton	0–1	Albion Rovers	Boghead Park
			Fleming 50'	Attendance: 2,500; Referee: W Addison

25 August 1923 League	King's Park	2–0	Dumbarton	Forthbank Park
	McLavin; Lamond			Attendance: 3,000

1 September 1923 League	Dumbarton	2–2	Cowdenbeath	Boghead Park
	Loney; Miller 43'		Sinclair 20' (pen.); Henderson 22'	Referee: J Sinclair

8 September 1923 League	Alloa Athletic	0–2	Dumbarton	Recreation Park, Alloa
			Miller (pen.); Loney

15 September 1923 League	Dumbarton	1–0	Arbroath	Boghead Park
	Hyslop 44'			Attendance: 2,000; Referee: G Grant

22 September 1923 League	Bathgate	2–1	Dumbarton	Mill Park, Bathgate
	Pearson (pen.); Drummond		Love	Attendance: 2,000; Referee: A Weir

29 September 1923 League	Dumbarton	1–1	Bo'ness	Boghead Park
	Kennedy 35'		Kelly 40'	Attendance: 1,500; Referee: J Robertson

6 October 1923 League	East Fife	2–0	Dumbarton	Bayview Park, Methil
	Cahill; Edgar			Attendance: 3,500; Referee: A Weir

13 October 1923 League	Dumbarton	1–0	Vale of Leven	Boghead Park
	Love			Attendance: 3,500; Referee: J Kirkbride

20 October 1923 League	Johnstone	0–1	Dumbarton	Newfield Park, Johnstone
			Loney 20'

27 October 1923 League	Dumbarton	3–0	Dundee United	Boghead Park
	Kennedy 37'; Mair 60'; Love			Attendance: 1,000; Referee: H Dickie

3 November 1923 League	Armadale	4–1	Dumbarton	Volunteer Park, Armadale
	Ramsay 4', 40', 67'; Cullen 69'		Love 84'	Attendance: 2,000; Referee: J Grant

10 November 1923 League	Dumbarton	1–4	St Johnstone	Boghead Park
	Love 5'		Ribchester; Hart; Fleming	Attendance: 2,000; Referee: J Rowe

17 November 1923 League	Dumbarton	2–0	Broxburn United	Boghead Park
	Love 20'; Mair			Attendance: 1,500; Referee: T Robertson

24 November 1923 League	Dunfermline Athletic	2–0	Dumbarton	East End Park
	Dickson 5'; Meikle			Attendance: 3,000; Referee: G Robertson

1 December 1923 League	Forfar Athletic	3–1	Dumbarton	Station Park, Forfar
	Miller 5'; Duncan 50'; Clark 55'		Hyslop (pen.)	Referee: P Craigmyle

8 December 1923 League	Dumbarton	0–1	Stenhousemuir	Boghead Park
			Aitken 70' (pen.)	Attendance: 1,000; Referee: J Martin

15 December 1923 League	Dumbarton	3–0	Lochgelly United	Boghead Park
	Hyslop 15'; Love 55'; Mair 88' (pen.)			Attendance: 1,000; Referee: W Addison

22 December 1923 League	St Bernard's	3–0	Dumbarton	Old Logie Green
	Young (pen.)			Referee: J Martin

29 December 1923 League	Dumbarton	1–0	Dunfermline Athletic	Boghead Park
	Miller 15'			Attendance: 1,000; Referee: J Aitken

1 January 1924 League	Dumbarton	0–5	King's Park	Boghead Park
			McLavin; Mackie 52' 82'; McConnachie 64'	Attendance: 3,000; Referee: T McMillan

2 January 1924 League	Albion Rovers	1–0	Dumbarton	Cliftonhill
	Kirk			Attendance: 4,000

5 January 1924 League	Broxburn United	3–0	Dumbarton	Sports Park, Broxburn
	Angus 40'; Hare 48'; Hendry 55'			Referee: W Gray

19 January 1924 League	Stenhousemuir	1–2	Dumbarton	Ochilview Park
	McCaig 12'		Stalker; Carlow	Referee: J Sinclair

2 February 1924 League	Dumbarton	1–1	East Fife	Boghead Park
	Kennedy		Hunter	Attendance: 2,000; Referee: W Bell

13 February 1924 League	St Johnstone	4–4	Dumbarton	Recreation Grounds, Perth
	Rollo; Walker; Trialist		Carlow 30'; Thomson

16 February 1924 League	Dundee United	0–1	Dumbarton	Tannadice Park
			Carlow 75'	Attendance: 3,000

20 February 1924 League	Dumbarton	5–1	Forfar Athletic	Boghead Park
	Miller 20'; Stalker 30', 85'; Hyslop 45'; Carlow		HcLean 75'	Attendance: 2,000; Referee: D Calder

23 February 1924 League	Dumbarton	5–0	Alloa Athletic	Boghead Park
	Stalker; Kennedy; Love; Miller (pen.)			Attendance: 3,000; Referee: W Gray

1 March 1924 League	Lochgelly United	0–2	Dumbarton	Recreation Park (Lochgelly)
			Stalker	Referee: J Calder

12 March 1924 League	Dumbarton	1–0	St Bernard's	Boghead Park
	Thomson

15 March 1924 League	Vale of Leven	2–2	Dumbarton	Millburn Park
	Donald 30' (pen.); McLardie		Kennedy 57'; Love 80'	Attendance: 2,500; Referee: W Gray

22 March 1924 League	Bo'ness	0–2	Dumbarton	Newtown Park, Bo'ness
			Stalker 20'	Attendance: 1,000; Referee: J Rowe

29 March 1924 League	Dumbarton	0–2	Armadale	Boghead Park
			Cullen 57'; Dale 85'	Attendance: 2,000; Referee: J Aitken

5 April 1924 League	Arbroath	3–0	Dumbarton	Gayfield Park
	McFarlane 25', 35', 80' (pen.)			Attendance: 3,500; Referee: T Small

12 April 1924 League	Cowdenbeath	4–1	Dumbarton	Central Park, Cowdenbeath
	Devlin (pen.); Leonard; Smith; Wilson		Thomson	Attendance: 5,000; Referee: J Martin

19 April 1924 League	Dumbarton	2–1	Johnstone	Boghead Park
	Carlow		Goal	Referee: D Calder

26 April 1924 League	Dumbarton	6–2	Bathgate	Boghead Park
	Kennedy 10'; Thomson; Loney; Hyslop 50'; Miller 85' (pen.)		Drummond; Leadbetter 44'	Referee: W Gray

== Scottish Cup ==
For the third season in a row, Dumbarton were knocked out in the first round, this time by Aberdeen.

26 January 1924 Cup R1	Aberdeen	2–1	Dumbarton	Pittodrie Park
	Jackson 20'; Miller 81'		Stalker	Attendance: 12,000; Referee: W Campbell

== Dumbartonshire Cup ==
The county cup reverted to knock out format and Dumbarton lost in the first round to Clydebank, after a replay.

12 September 1923 First Round	Dumbarton	1–1	Clydebank	Boghead Park
	Hyslop		Devan

16 April 1924 First Round replay	Clydebank	2–0	Dumbarton	Clydeholm Park
	Smith 55', 90'			Attendance: 500; Referee: J Rowe

== Friendlies ==
Three 'friendly' matches were played, winning 1 and losing 2, scoring 4 goals for the loss of 7.

8 March 1924 Friendly	Hamilton	0–2	Dumbarton	Douglas Park
			Goal

30 April 1924 Friendly	Dumbarton	1–4	Celtic	Boghead Park
	McGhee		Gallacher; Jones; Cassidy

3 May 1924 Friendly	Helensburgh	3–1	Dumbarton	Helensburgh
	Goal		Goal

== Player statistics ==
=== Squad ===
No.	Pos	Nat	Player	Total		Second Division		Scottish Cup	
No.	Pos	Nat	Player	Apps	Goals	Apps	Goals	Apps	Goals
	GK	(Scotland) SCO	Andrew Chalmers	18	0	17	0	1	0
	GK	(Scotland) SCO	Harper	1	0	1	0	0	0
	GK	(Scotland) SCO	Arthur King	20	0	20	0	0	0
	DF	(Scotland) SCO	Cairns	4	0	4	0	0	0
	DF	(Scotland) SCO	William Gibson	37	0	36	0	1	0
	DF	(Scotland) SCO	Alex Murray	2	0	2	0	0	0
	DF	(Scotland) SCO	James Warden	1	0	1	0	0	0
	DF	(Scotland) SCO	Robert Robertson	25	0	24	0	1	0
	MF	(Scotland) SCO	Beattie	2	0	2	0	0	0
	MF	(Scotland) SCO	Joseph Bell	16	0	16	0	0	0
	MF	(Scotland) SCO	William Hyslop	34	5	33	5	1	0
	MF	(Scotland) SCO	Henry Loney	38	4	37	4	1	0
	MF	(Scotland) SCO	Andrew Mair	37	3	36	3	1	0
	MF	(Scotland) SCO	James Stalker	33	10	32	9	1	1
	FW	(Scotland) SCO	Duncan Cameron	6	0	6	0	0	0
	FW	(Scotland) SCO	Francis Carlow	14	9	13	9	1	0
	FW	(Scotland) SCO	Donald Colman	1	0	1	0	0	0
	FW	(Scotland) SCO	Alexander Hunter	1	0	1	0	0	0
	FW	(Scotland) SCO	Alex Jackson	2	0	2	0	0	0
	FW	(Scotland) SCO	Philip Kennedy	39	5	38	5	1	0
	FW	(Scotland) SCO	Thomas Love	29	9	29	9	0	0
	FW	(Scotland) SCO	McGoldrick	1	0	1	0	0	0
	FW	(Scotland) SCO	Andrew Miller	39	6	38	6	1	0
	FW	(Scotland) SCO	Norman Thomson	23	5	22	5	1	0
	FW	(Scotland) SCO	Trialist	6	0	6	0	0	0

=== Transfers ===
==== Players in ====
Player	From	Date
(Scotland) Johseph Bell	(Scotland) St Roch's	11 Jun 1923
(Scotland) Thomas Love	(Scotland) Cadder United	6 Jul 1923
(Scotland) Duncan Cameron	(Scotland) Vale of Leven	9 Jul 1923
(Scotland) William Gibson	(Scotland) Morton (loan)	15 Aug 1923
(Scotland) James Stalker	(Scotland) Armadale	27 Sep 1923
(Scotland) Andrew Chalmers	(Scotland)	1 Jan 1924
(Scotland) Francis Carlow	(Scotland) Partick Thistle	2 Jan 1924
(Scotland) Andrew Miller	(Scotland) Celtic	

==== Players out ====
Player	To	Date
(Republic of Ireland) Harry Chatton	(Scotland) Partick Thistle	1 May 1923
(Scotland) Peter Halleron	(Scotland) Alloa Athletic	20 Jun 1923
(Scotland) James Alexander	(Scotland) Alloa Athletic	20 Jun 1923
(Scotland) Duncan Scott	(Scotland) Hamilton (manager)	20 Jul 1923
(Scotland) John Goodwin	(Scotland) Dumbarton Harp	28 Aug 1923
(Scotland) James Campbell	(Scotland) Vale of Leven	4 Sep 1923
(Scotland) Robert McEwan	(Scotland) Freed	19 Nov 1923
(Scotland) Tim Lenathen	(Scotland) Helesburgh	16 Jan 1924
(Scotland) Hugh McBride	(Scotland) East Fife	
(Scotland) William Watson	(Scotland) Galston	
(Scotland) Alexander Henderson	(Scotland) Freed	

In addition McGoldrick and Cairns (St Roch's), Beattie (Vale of Leven), and Alex Murray, James Warden, Harper and Alexander Hunter all played as 'trialists'.
