= 1921–22 Aberdeen F.C. season =

Aberdeen F.C.
1921–22 season
- Chairman: William Philip
- Manager: Jimmy Philip
- Scottish Football League Division One: 15th
- Scottish Cup: Semi final
- Top goalscorer: League: Johnny Miller (23); All: Johnny Miller (27)
- Highest home attendance: 28,000 vs. Dundee, 25 February 1922
- Lowest home attendance: 8,000 vs. Raith Rovers, 3 January 1922

Aberdeen F.C. competed in Scottish Football League Division One and Scottish Cup in season 1921–22.

== Overview ==
Aberdeen finished in 15th place out of 22 clubs in Division One, missing out on relegation by five points. In the Scottish Cup, they made it through to the semi-final stage, but lost 3–1 to Morton at Dens Park, Dundee. New signing Johnny Miller scored a record 27 goals this season.

== Results ==
=== Scottish Division One ===
Match Day	Date	Opponent	H/A	Score	Aberdeen Scorer(s)	Attendance
1	20 August	Ayr United	H	1–0	Miller	16,000
2	27 August	Dumbarton	A	1–1	Miller	4,500
3	30 August	Partick Thistle	A	0–2		16,000
4	3 September	Dundee	H	1–2	Miller	18,000
5	10 September	Celtic	H	1–1	Rankine	21,000
6	14 September	Falkirk	H	1–1	Miller	14,000
7	17 September	Kilmarnock	A	3–2	Connon, Miller (2)	7,000
8	21 September	Clydebank	A	1–1	Miller	5,000
9	24 September	Rangers	A	0–1		26,000
10	26 September	Queen's Park	H	2–1	Miller, Robertson	15,000
11	1 October	Hibernian	H	1–2	Miller	14,500
12	8 October	Raith Rovers	A	1–2	Wright	12,000
13	15 October	Clyde	H	4–2	Thomson, Miller (3)	14,500
14	22 October	Hamilton Academical	A	2–2	Wright, Miller	6,500
15	29 October	Third Lanark	H	3–0	Miller (3)	12,000
16	5 November	Albion Rovers	A	2–0	Thomson, Miller	2,000
17	12 November	Airdrieonians	H	3–0	Middleton, Miller, Bainbridge	15,000
18	19 November	Falkirk	A	1–2	Miller	8,500
19	26 November	Partick Thistle	H	2–1	Thomson, Rankine	16,500
20	3 December	Heart of Midlothian	A	1–2	Rankine	15,000
21	10 December	St Mirren	H	0–1		15,500
22	17 December	Motherwell	H	2–0	Thomson, Rankine	12,500
23	24 December	Morton	A	1–2	Robertson	5,000
24	31 December	Clydebank	H	2–0	Thomson (2)	12,000
25	2 January	Dundee	A	0–1		22,000
26	3 January	Raith Rovers	H	1–2	Thomson	8,000
27	7 January	Airdrieonians	A	0–4		5,500
28	14 January	Dumbarton	H	3–0	Miller, Rankine (2)	12,000
29	21 January	Celtic	A	0–2		12,500
30	4 February	Hamilton Academical	H	0–0		11,000
31	18 February	Morton	H	2–2	Thomson, Miller	11,500
32	21 February	Clyde	A	0–2		2,000
33	1 March	Queen's Park	A	1–3	Miller	10,000
34	4 March	St Mirren	A	1–2	Thomson	12,000
35	22 March	Albion Rovers	H	2–0	Miller, Rankine	10,000
36	25 March	Ayr United	A	1–1	Thomson	5,000
37	5 April	Rangers	H	0–0		19,000
38	8 April	Kilmarnock	H	0–1		11,000
39	12 April	Motherwell	A	0–3		5,000
40	19 April	Third Lanark	A	0–2		4,500
41	22 April	Hibernian	H	1–0	Grant	10,000
42	29 April	Heart of Midlothian	H	0–1		12,000

==== Final standings ====
Pos	Team	Pld	W	D	L	GF	GA	GD	Pts
13	Motherwell	42	16	7	19	63	58	+5	39
14	Ayr United	42	13	12	17	55	63	−8	38
15	Aberdeen	42	13	9	20	48	54	−6	35
16	Airdrieonians	42	12	11	19	46	56	−10	35
17	Kilmarnock	42	13	9	20	56	83	−27	35

Source: "1921-1922 Division 1 - SPFL Archive". SPFL.

=== Scottish Cup ===
Round	Date	Opponent	H/A	Score	Aberdeen Scorer(s)	Attendance
R1	28 January	Dumbarton	H	1–0	Thomson	16,000
R2	11 February	Queen's Park	H	1–1	Thomson	22,000
R2 R	14 February	Queen's Park	A	2–1	Miller (2)	18,000
R3	25 February	Dundee	H	3–0	Wright, Miller, Bainbridge	28,000
R4	11 March	Hamilton Academical	A	0–0		16,000
R4 R	15 March	Hamilton Academical	H	2–0	Miller, Rankine	23,000
SF	1 April	Morton	N	1–3	Milne	23,000

== Squad ==
=== Appearances & Goals ===
No.	Pos	Nat	Player	Total		Division One		Scottish Cup	
No.	Pos	Nat	Player	Apps	Goals	Apps	Goals	Apps	Goals
	FW	(Scotland) SCO	Fred Alexander	9	0	9	0	0	0
	GK	(England) ENG	George Anderson	25	0	25	0	0	0
	FW	(England) ENG	Simpson Bainbridge	29	2	22	1	7	1
	GK	(England) ENG	Harry Blackwell	24	0	17	0	7	0
	FW	(Scotland) SCO	Jacky Connon	13	1	13	1	0	0
	FW	(Scotland) SCO	Peter Fisher	2	0	2	0	0	0
	FW	(Scotland) SCO	Harry Flanagan	4	0	4	0	0	0
	DF	(Scotland) SCO	Matt Forsyth	41	0	35	0	6	0
	FW	(Scotland) SCO	Walter Grant	5	1	5	1	0	0
	DF	(Scotland) SCO	Sandy Grosert	20	0	17	0	3	0
	DF	(Scotland) SCO	Bobby Hannah	3	0	3	0	0	0
	DF	(Scotland) SCO	Jock Hutton	35	0	29	0	6	0
	FW	(Scotland) SCO	James Mackie	1	0	1	0	0	0
	MF	(Scotland) SCO	Bert MacLachlan (c)	45	0	38	0	7	0
	MF	(Scotland) SCO	Fred MacLachlan	6	0	6	0	0	0
	DF	(Scotland) SCO	James McBoyle	1	0	1	0	0	0
	FW	(England) ENG	Billy Middleton	47	1	40	1	7	0
	FW	(Scotland) SCO	Johnny Miller	42	27	35	23	7	4
	MF	(Scotland) SCO	Vic Milne	45	1	38	0	7	1
	FW	(Scotland) SCO	Alec Moir	3	0	3	0	0	0
	FW	(Scotland) SCO	Andy Rankine	40	8	33	7	7	1
	FW	(Scotland) SCO	Arthur Robertson	8	2	8	2	0	0
	FW	(Scotland) SCO	James Stevenson	2	0	2	0	0	0
	FW	(Scotland) SCO	Doug Thomson	38	12	31	10	7	2
	MF	(Scotland) SCO	Alex Wright	46	3	40	2	6	1
	FW	(Scotland) SCO	Bobby Yule	5	0	5	0	0	0
