= 1922–23 Dumbarton F.C. season =

Dumbarton
1922–1923 season
- Manager: Donald Colman
- Stadium: Boghead Park, Dumbarton
- Scottish League Division Two: 4th
- Scottish Cup: First Round
- Top goalscorer: League: James Alexander (17); All: James Alexander (17)
- Highest home attendance: 5,000
- Lowest home attendance: 1,500
- Average home league attendance: 3,200
Home colours

The 1922–23 season was the 46th Scottish football season in which Dumbarton competed at national level, entering the Scottish Football League and the Scottish Cup. In addition Dumbarton entered the Dumbartonshire Cup and the Dumbartonshire Charity Cup.

== Scottish League ==
In their first season back in the Second Division for a decade, Dumbarton finished 4th, out of 18, with 42 points - 15 behind champions Queen's Park. A poor away record and the inability to win against their closest rivals at the top of the league were the main reasons for the promotion challenge failing.

19 August 1922 League	Dumbarton	3–0	Arbroath	Boghead Park
	Kennedy 10'; Alexander 15'; Thomson 48'			Attendance: 3,000; Referee: J Mair

26 August 1922 League	Dunfermline Athletic	3–0	Dumbarton	East End Park
	Smith 15'; Mercer			Attendance: 7,500; Referee: H Forsyth

2 September 1922 League	Dumbarton	3–0	Armadale	Boghead Park
	Kennedy; Miller; Thomson 89'			Attendance: 4,000; Referee: A Weir

9 September 1922 League	Clydebank	1–1	Dumbarton	Clydeholm Park
	Bell 87'		Alexander 75'	Attendance: 4,000; Referee: P McMillan

16 September 1922 League	Dumbarton	3–0	Vale of Leven	Boghead Park
	Thomson 5'; Alexander 70'			Attendance: 5,000; Referee: J Sinclair

23 September 1922 League	St Johnstone	1–0	Dumbarton	Recreation Grounds, Perth
	Gallagher 70'			Attendance: 4,000; Referee: G McKenzie

25 September 1922 League	Dumbarton	2–0	Dunfermline Athletic	Boghead Park
	Alexander; Kennedy			Attendance: 3,000; Referee: M O'Brien

30 September 1922 League	Dumbarton	1–1	Broxburn United	Boghead Park
	Miller 63'		Quinn	Attendance: 3,000; Referee: W Addison

7 October 1922 League	East Fife	2–1	Dumbarton	Bayview Park, Methil
	Weir		Loney 10'	Attendance: 5,000; Referee: A Weir

14 October 1922 League	Dumbarton	2–0	King's Park	Boghead Park
	Mair 60'; Chatton			Attendance: 5,000

21 October 1922 League	Bo'ness	0–2	Dumbarton	Newtown Park, Bo'ness
			Alesander; Kennedy	Attendance: 3,000; Referee: J Grant

28 October 1922 League	Dumbarton	2–1	St Bernard's	Boghead Park
	Chatton; Kennedy 43'		Anderson	Attendance: 4,000

4 November 1922 League	Johnstone	2–0	Dumbarton	Newfield Park, Johnstone
	McDonald; Stewart			Referee: J Sinclair

11 November 1922 League	Queen's Park	3–2	Dumbarton	Hampden Park
	Scott 18'; Dickson 36'; Kelso 60'		Thomson; Alexander 68'	Attendance: 15,000; Referee: J Muir

18 November 1922 League	Dumbarton	2–0	Bathgate	Boghead Park
	Alexander; Miller 90'			Attendance: 3,000; Referee: A Weir

25 November 1922 League	Forfar Athletic	3–0	Dumbarton	Station Park, Forfar
			Loney; Hyslop; Kennedy	Referee: A Weir

2 December 1922 League	Dumbarton	1–0	Stenhousemuir	Boghead Park
	Thomson 75'			Attendance: 3,000; Referee: A Johnston

9 December 1922 League	East Stirling	0–0; VOID	Dumbarton	Firs Park

16 December 1922 League	Dumbarton	1–0	Cowdenbeath	Boghead Park
	Alexander 15'			Attendance: 3,000; Referee: T McMillan

20 December 1922 League	East Stirling	2–1	Dumbarton	Firs Park
	Trialist		Thomson 50' (pen.)	Attendance: 1,500; Referee: L Wynne

23 December 1922 League	Dumbarton	2–0	Bo'ness	Boghead Park
	Alexander 50'; Jackson 60'			Attendance: 3,000; Referee: J Muir

30 December 1922 League	Vale of Leven	0–3	Dumbarton	Millburn Park
			Loney 50'; Alexander 65'; Jackson	Attendance: 4,000; Referee: J Aitken

1 January 1923 League	Dumbarton	1–1	Clydebank	Boghead Park
	Hyslop		Goal	Attendance: 5,000

2 January 1923 League	Lochgelly United	3–2	Dumbarton	Recreation Park (Lochgelly)
	Goal		Miller (o.g.)

6 January 1923 League	Dumbarton	3–0	East Stirling	Boghead Park
	Miller 40' (pen.); Thomson 48'			Attendance: 3,000; Referee: H Russell

20 January 1923 League	Cowdenbeath	1–0	Dumbarton	Central Park, Cowdenbeath
	Devlin			Referee: T Dougray

27 January 1923 League	Arbroath	1–1	Dumbarton	Gayfield Park
	Ritchie 54'		Thomson 43'	Attendance: 2,000; Referee: J Kilbride

29 January 1923 League	Dumbarton	6–1	Johnstone	Boghead Park
	Chatton; Kennedy; Mair		Gillies	Attendance: 1,500

3 February 1923 League	Bathgate	4–1	Dumbarton	Mill Park, Bathgate
	Chalmers 2'; Pearson (pen.); McAllister 65'; Drummond 90'		Chatton	Attendance: 1,500; Referee: A Allan

17 February 1923 League	Broxburn United	1–1	Dumbarton	Sports Park, Broxburn
	Tait		Miller 3'	Attendance: 2,000; Referee: A Weir

24 February 1923 League	Dumbarton	1–1	Forfar Athletic	Boghead Park
	Alexander 90' (pen.)		Langlands 70'	Attendance: 2,000; Referee: W Addison

3 March 1923 League	Armadale	1–0	Dumbarton	Volunteer Park, Armadale
	Muir 20'			Attendance: 2,000; Referee: N MacMillan

10 March 1923 League	Dumbarton	1–2	East Fife	Boghead Park
	Kennedy 40'		Murray 20'; Weir	Attendance: 2,000; Referee: J Aitken

17 March 1923 League	St Bernard's	0–1	Dumbarton	Old Logie Green
			Cunningham

24 March 1923 League	Dumbarton	0–0	St Johnstone	Boghead Park
				Attendance: 2,500

7 April 1923 League	King's Park	2–2	Dumbarton	Forthbank Park
	Goal		Alexander 80' (pen.)	Attendance: 2,500; Referee: J McMillan

9 April 1923 League	Dumbarton	0–2	Queen's Park	Boghead Park
			Moreland 5'; McAlpine 70'	Attendance: 5,000; Referee: A McMahon

21 April 1923 League	Stenhousemuir	4–1	Dumbarton	Ochilview Park
	Campbell, A Campbell, C Lauder; Campbell, M		Alexander	Attendance: 2,500; Referee: J Stevenson

28 April 1923 League	Dumbarton	5–0	Lochgelly United	Boghead Park
	Alexander 80'; Kennedy; Miller; Halleron			Attendance: 1,000

== Scottish Cup ==
In the Scottish Cup, Dumbarton were knocked out in the first round by Dunfermline Athletic.

13 January 1923 Cup R1	Dunfermline Athletic	1–0	Dumbarton	East End Park
	Donald 55'			Attendance: 8,000; Referee: W Hamilton

== Dumbartonshire Cup ==
Dumbarton retained the Dumbartonshire Cup by going through the league phase and the final with a 100% record.

10 February 1923 Group	Dumbarton	3–1; VOID	Helensburgh	Boghead Park
	Jackson; Alexander; Miller		Goal

2 April 1923 Group	Vale of Leven	0–2	Dumbarton	Millburn Park
			Thomson 16'; Halleron 80'	Attendance: 1,000

11 April 1923 Group	Renton	0–2	Dumbarton	Tontine Park
			Kennedy; Miller

14 April 1922 Group	Helensburgh	0–3	Dumbarton	Helensburgh
			Goal

16 April 1923 Group	Dumbarton Harp	2–4	Dumbarton	Meadow Park, Dumbarton
	Ferguson; Allan		Halleron; Kennedy; Jackson	Attendance: 500

18 April 1923 Group	Dumbarton	3–1	Clydebank	Boghead Park
	Kennedy; Miller		Bell	Attendance: 1,000

30 April 1923 Final	Dumbarton	1–0	Dumbarton Harp	Boghead Park
	Alexander 65'

== Dumbartonshire Charity Cup ==
Dumbarton continued the local success by retaining the Dumbartonshire Charity Cup, defeating Clydebank in the final.

6 May 1923 First Rounmd	Dumbarton Harp	0–3	Dumbarton	Meadow Park, Dumbarton
			Hyslop; Halleron; Mair

9 May 1923 Semi Final	Vale of Leven	0–2	Dumbarton	Millburn Park
			Halleron; Alexander

12 May 1923 Final	Dumbarton	2–0	Clydebank	Boghead Park
	Alexander			Attendance: 1,000

== Friendly ==
31 March 1923 Friendly	Queen of the South	2–1	Dumbarton	Palmerston Park
	Goal		Goal

== Player statistics ==
No.	Pos	Nat	Player	Total		Second Division		Scottish Cup	
No.	Pos	Nat	Player	Apps	Goals	Apps	Goals	Apps	Goals
	GK	(Scotland) SCO	John Goodwin	17	0	17	0	0	0
	GK	(Scotland) SCO	Arthur King	22	0	21	0	1	0
	DF	(Scotland) SCO	James Barrie	1	0	1	0	0	0
	DF	(Scotland) SCO	Donald Colman	9	0	9	0	0	0
	DF	(Scotland) SCO	Alex Henderson	22	0	22	0	0	0
	DF	(Scotland) SCO	Tim Lenathen	1	0	1	0	0	0
	DF	(Scotland) SCO	Robert Robertson	34	0	33	0	1	0
	MF	(Ireland) EIR	Harry Chatton	34	5	33	5	1	0
	MF	(Scotland) SCO	William Hyslop	22	2	21	2	1	0
	MF	(Scotland) SCO	Henry Loney	34	3	33	3	1	0
	MF	(Scotland) SCO	Andrew Mair	39	3	38	3	1	0
	MF	(Scotland) SCO	Alex McConnachie	1	0	1	0	0	0
	FW	(Scotland) SCO	James Alexander	23	17	23	17	0	0
	FW	(Scotland) SCO	James Campbell	2	1	2	1	0	0
	FW	(Scotland) SCO	Cunningham	2	1	2	1	0	0
	FW	(Scotland) SCO	Archibald Fotheringham	1	0	1	0	0	0
	FW	(Scotland) SCO	Peter Halleron	5	1	5	1	0	0
	FW	(Scotland) SCO	Alex Jackson	28	2	27	2	1	0
	FW	(Scotland) SCO	Philip Kennedy	36	10	35	10	1	0
	FW	(Scotland) SCO	Hugh McBride	2	0	2	0	0	0
	FW	(Scotland) SCO	Robert McEwan	13	0	13	0	0	0
	FW	(Scotland) SCO	Andrew Miller	38	8	37	8	1	0
	FW	(Scotland) SCO	Norman Thomson	36	8	35	8	1	0
	FW	(Scotland) SCO	William Watson	6	0	6	0	0	0

=== Transfers ===
==== Players in ====
Player	From	Date
(Scotland) Philip Kennedy	(Scotland) Bellshill Athletic	5 Jul 1922
(Scotland) Alex Jackson	(Scotland) Renton Victoria	8 Jul 1922
(Scotland) Tim Lenathen	(Scotland) Falkirk	22 Jul 1922
(Scotland) Andrew Miller	(Scotland) Celtic (loan)	29 Jul 1922
(Scotland) John Goodwin	(Scotland) St Anthony's	16 Aug 1922
(Scotland) William Hyslop	(Scotland) Vale of Leven	19 Oct 1922
(Scotland) James Campbell	(Scotland) St Anthony's	8 Jan 1923
(Scotland) William Watson	(Scotland) Galston	2 Mar 1923
(Scotland) James Barrie	(Scotland) Duntocher Hibs (loan)	9 Mar 1923
(Scotland) Archibald Fotheringham	(Scotland) Dumbarton Juniors (loan)	20 Apr 1923

==== Players out ====
Player	To	Date
(Scotland) Jock Wood	(England) Manchester United	18 May 1922
(Scotland) Robert Godfrey	(Scotland) East Stirling	14 Aug 1922
(Scotland) John Browning	(Scotland) Vale of Leven	23 Aug 1922
(Scotland) Hugh McBride	(Scotland) East Fife	21 Sep 1922
(Scotland) Tim Lenathen	(Scotland) Helensburgh (loan)	28 Oct 1922
(Scotland) Robert McEwan	(Scotland) Vale of Leven (loan)	9 Jan 1923
(Scotland) John Hagan	(Scotland) Dumbarton Harp	11 Apr 1923
(Scotland) Andrew Chalmers	(England) Bradford City	
(Scotland) John Coutts	(Scotland) Alloa Athletic	
(England) Richard Field	(Wales) Aberdare Athletic	
(Scotland) William Fraser	(Scotland) Kirkintilloch Rob Roy	
(Scotland) Douglas Haggo	(Scotland) Johnstone	
(Scotland) James Taylor	(England) Everton	

In addition James Forrest, Charles Gordon, James Robertson and Alexander Shedden all played their final 'first XI' games in Dumbarton colours.
