= Bert McLachlan =

Scottish footballer

Bert MacLachlan
Personal information
- Full name: Albert James MacLachlan
- Date of birth: 18 February 1892
- Place of birth: Kirkcudbright, Scotland
- Date of death: 1956 (aged 63–64)
- Place of death: Edinburgh, Scotland
- Position: Defender

Youth career
- St Cuthbert Wanderers

Senior career*
Years	Team	Apps	(Gls)
1913–1914	Aston Villa	3	(0)
1914–1927	Aberdeen	315	(16)
1927–1929	Heart of Midlothian	0	(0)
1929	Airdrieonians	2	(0)
1929–1939	Elgin City		

International career
1920	Scottish League XI	1	(0)
- * Club domestic league appearances and goals

Albert James McLachlan (18 February 1892 – 1956) was a Scottish professional football defender who played for Aston Villa, Aberdeen and Heart of Midlothian.

McLachlan joined Aston Villa from St Cuthbert Wanderers in 1913, but played only three games for the English club. He moved to Aberdeen in 1914, where he was appointed captain in 1919 having served as a gunner during World War I. He left Aberdeen for Heart of Midlothian in 1927, and joined Elgin City. He died in 1956.

His brothers Fred and John were also footballers.

== Career statistics ==
Appearances and goals by club, season and competition
Club	Season	League			National Cup		Total	
Club	Season	Division	Apps	Goals	Apps	Goals	Apps	Goals
Aston Villa	1913–14	First Division	3	0	0	0	3	0
Aston Villa	Total		3	0	0	0	3	0
Aberdeen	1914–15	Scottish Division One	36	4	–		36	4
Aberdeen	1915–16	Scottish Division One	25	1	–		25	1
Aberdeen	1916–17	Scottish Division One	1	0	–		1	0
Aberdeen	1917–18	Aberdeen Dropped Out of Competitive Football due to WW1						
Aberdeen	1918–19	Aberdeen Dropped Out of Competitive Football due to WW1						
Aberdeen	1919–20	Scottish Division One	30	2	4	0	34	2
Aberdeen	1920–21	Scottish Division One	25	1	4	0	29	1
Aberdeen	1921–22	Scottish Division One	39	0	7	0	46	0
Aberdeen	1922–23	Scottish Division One	32	1	4	0	36	1
Aberdeen	1923–24	Scottish Division One	38	1	7	0	45	1
Aberdeen	1924–25	Scottish Division One	35	0	6	0	41	0
Aberdeen	1925–26	Scottish Division One	30	1	8	0	38	1
Aberdeen	1926–27	Scottish Division One	24	5	3	0	27	0
Aberdeen	Total		315	16	43	0	361	16
Hearts	1926–27	Scottish Division One	0	0	0	0	0	0
Hearts	1927–28	Scottish Division One	0	0	0	0	0	0
Hearts	1928–29	Scottish Division One	0	0	0	0	0	0
Hearts	Total		0	0	0	0	0	0
Airdrieonians	1929–30	Scottish Division One	2	0	–	–	2	0
Airdrieonians	Total		2	0	-	-	2+	0+
Elgin City	1929–1939	–	–	–	–	–	–	–
Elgin City	Total		-	-	-	-	-	-
Career total			319+	16+	43+	0+	365+	16+
