= 1920–21 Aberdeen F.C. season =

Aberdeen F.C.
1920–21 season
- Chairman: William Philip
- Manager: Jimmy Philip
- Scottish Football League: 11th
- Scottish Cup: Third round
- Top goalscorer: League: Peter Fisher (14); All: Peter Fisher (14)
- Highest home attendance: 24,000 vs. Celtic, 28 August 1920
- Lowest home attendance: 8,500 vs. Kilmarnock, 12 March 1921

Aberdeen F.C. competed in the Scottish Football League and Scottish Cup in season 1920–21.

== Overview ==
Aberdeen finished in 11th place out of 22 clubs in the Scottish Football League, an improvement on the previous season's finish of 17th. In the cup, they lost out to local rivals Dundee after a second replay in the third round. Peter Fisher finished as the club's top scorer with 14 goals.

== Results ==
=== Scottish Football League ===
Match Day	Date	Opponent	H/A	Score	Aberdeen Scorer(s)	Attendance
1	21 August	Dundee	A	1–1	Fisher	5,000
2	24 August	Rangers	A	1–2	Thomson	20,000
3	28 August	Celtic	H	1–2	Wright	24,000
4	30 August	Third Lanark	A	1–3	Connon	12,000
5	4 September	Albion Rovers	A	2–0	Fisher, Rankine	8,000
6	8 September	Clyde	H	3–0	Thomson, Fisher, Rankine	14,000
7	11 September	Ayr United	H	0–0		16,000
8	15 September	Hamilton Academical	H	3–1	Wright (2), MacDonald	10,000
9	18 September	Morton	A	1–6	Grant	7,000
10	25 September	Rangers	H	1–1	Fisher	21,800
11	27 September	Queen's Park	H	2–2	Fisher (2)	12,000
12	2 October	Clydebank	A	1–1	Thomson	5,000
13	9 October	Hibernian	H	0–1		13,500
14	16 October	Hamilton Academical	A	2–0	Thomson, Rankine	6,000
15	23 October	Raith Rovers	H	1–0	Connon	13,000
16	30 October	Clyde	A	0–2		6,000
17	6 November	Third Lanark	H	0–1		12,500
18	13 November	Heart of Midlothian	A	0–0		15,000
19	20 November	St Mirren	H	3–1	Rankine (2), Flanagan	14,000
20	27 November	Dumbarton	A	1–0	Middleton	2,500
21	4 December	Airdrieonians	H	1–0	Thomson	12,000
22	11 December	Kilmarnock	A	0–1		6,000
23	18 December	Motherwell	H	1–1	Flanagan	12,500
24	25 December	Partick Thistle	H	0–3		13,000
25	1 January	Dundee	H	0–0		20,000
26	3 January	Ayr United	A	2–2	Connon, Rankine	6,000
27	8 January	Raith Rovers	A	0–1		9,000
28	15 January	Falkirk	H	1–1	Fisher	11,000
29	22 January	Clydebank	H	4–0	Milne, Middleton, Flanagan (2)	10,500
30	29 January	Celtic	A	1–3	Fisher	15,000
31	8 February	St Mirren	A	1–1	MacDonald	7,500
32	26 February	Morton	H	0–1		9,000
33	5 March	Hibernian	A	3–2	Middleton, Mackie, Own goal	6,500
34	9 March	Airdrieonians	A	2–5	Connon, Mackie	3,000
35	12 March	Kilmarnock	H	1–1	Hutton	8,500
36	19 March	Queen's Park	A	2–0	Fisher, Own goal	6,500
37	26 March	Dumbarton	H	2–0	Fisher (2)	10,000
38	2 April	Partick Thistle	A	2–2	Fisher, Flanagan	12,000
39	9 April	Heart of Midlothian	H	5–2	Wright, MacLachlan, Connon, Fisher, Thomson	12,500
40	16 April	Motherwell	A	0–4		8,000
41	23 April	Falkirk	A	0–0		7,000
42	30 April	Albion Rovers	H	1–0	Fisher	11,500

==== Final standings ====
Pos	Team	Pld	W	D	L	GF	GA	GD	Pts
10	Airdrieonians	42	17	9	16	71	64	+7	43
11	Kilmarnock	42	17	8	17	62	68	−6	42
12	Aberdeen	42	14	14	14	53	54	−1	42
13	Hibernian	42	16	9	17	58	57	+1	41
14	Hamilton Academical	42	14	12	16	44	57	−13	40

=== Scottish Cup ===
Round	Date	Opponent	H/A	Score	Aberdeen Scorer(s)	Attendance
R2	5 February	Kilmarnock	A	2–1	Connon, MacDonald	11,000
R3	19 February	Dundee	A	0–0		30,000
R3 R	23 February	Dundee	H	1–1	Grosert	20,000
R3 2R	1 March	Dundee	N	0–2		10,000

== Squad ==
=== Appearances & Goals ===
No.	Pos	Nat	Player	Total		Division One		Scottish Cup	
No.	Pos	Nat	Player	Apps	Goals	Apps	Goals	Apps	Goals
	GK	(England) ENG	George Anderson	42	0	38	0	4	0
	FW	(Scotland) SCO	Jacky Connon	29	6	25	5	4	1
	FW	(Scotland) SCO	Peter Fisher	21	14	21	14	0	0
	FW	(Scotland) SCO	Harry Flanagan	29	4	25	4	4	0
	DF	(Scotland) SCO	Matt Forsyth	23	0	23	0	0	0
	FW	(Scotland) SCO	Walter Grant	2	1	2	1	0	0
	MF	(Scotland) SCO	Sandy Grosert	33	1	29	0	4	1
	DF	(Scotland) SCO	Bobby Hannah	30	0	26	0	4	0
	DF	(Scotland) SCO	Jock Hutton	32	1	28	1	4	0
	MF	(Scotland) SCO	Andy Lees	3	0	3	0	0	0
	FW	(Wales) WAL	Ken MacDonald	11	3	7	2	4	1
	FW	(Scotland) SCO	James Mackie	3	2	3	2	0	0
	MF	(Scotland) SCO	Bert MacLachlan (c)	29	1	25	1	4	0
	MF	(Scotland) SCO	Alec McCombie	2	0	2	0	0	0
	FW	(Scotland) SCO	Jim McLaughlin	5	0	5	0	0	0
	FW	(England) ENG	Billy Middleton	43	3	39	3	4	0
	MF	(Scotland) SCO	Vic Milne	31	1	31	1	0	0
	FW	(Scotland) SCO	Andy Rankine	34	6	30	6	4	0
	FW	(Scotland) SCO	Jim Ritchie	7	0	7	0	0	0
	MF	(Scotland) SCO	Arthur Robertson	16	0	16	0	0	0
	GK	(Scotland) SCO	George Sutherland	4	0	4	0	0	0
	FW	(Scotland) SCO	Doug Thomson	36	7	36	7	0	0
	MF	(Scotland) SCO	Charlie Watt	1	0	1	0	0	0
	FW	(Scotland) SCO	Andy Wilson	1	0	1	0	0	0
	MF	(Scotland) SCO	Alex Wright	30	4	26	4	4	0
	FW	(Scotland) SCO	Bobby Yule	9	0	9	0	0	0
