= 1922–23 Aberdeen F.C. season =

Aberdeen F.C.
1922–23 season
- Chairman: William Philip
- Manager: Jimmy Philip (20th season)
- Scottish Football League Division One: 5th
- Scottish Cup: Quarter final
- Top goalscorer: League: Andy Rankine (14); All: Andy Rankine (17)
- Highest home attendance: 27,000 vs. Rangers, 14 October 1922
- Lowest home attendance: 3,241 vs. Peterhead, 10 February 1923

Aberdeen F.C. competed in the Scottish Football League Division One and Scottish Cup in season 1922–23.

== Overview ==
Aberdeen finished in fifth place out of 20 in Scottish Division One, their highest finish since 1911. A new ground record for Pittodrie Stadium was set in October, when 27,000 spectators attended a game against Rangers which finished 0–0.

During the Scottish Cup, a club record victory was achieved over Peterhead in the third round. Aberdeen won 13–0.

Andy Rankine was the club's top scorer this season with 17; fourteen in the league and three in the cup.

== Results ==
=== Scottish Division One ===
Match Day	Date	Opponent	H/A	Score	Aberdeen Scorer(s)	Attendance
1	16 August	Kilmarnock	A	0–1		8,500
2	19 August	Dundee	A	1–1	Rankine	22,000
3	26 August	Raith Rovers	H	1–0	Miller	16,000
4	2 September	Albion Rovers	A	2–0	Thomson, Miller	4,000
5	9 September	Hibernian	H	2–0	Miller, Rankine	20,000
6	16 September	Morton	A	1–2	Rankine	4,000
7	23 September	Falkirk	H	2–2	Rankine (2)	7,000
8	25 September	Celtic	H	3–1	Milne, Miller, Rankine	23,500
9	30 September	St Mirren	H	4–2	Thomson, Miller (2), Smith	16,000
10	2 October	Alloa Athletic	A	2–0	Middleton, Thomson	5,000
11	7 October	Airdrieonians	A	0–2		8,000
12	14 October	Rangers	H	0–0		27,000
13	21 October	Motherwell	A	1–3	Rankine	7,000
14	28 October	Hamilton Academical	H	1–0	Thomson	11,000
15	4 November	Third Lanark	A	1–2	Thomson	10,000
16	11 November	Heart of Midlothian	H	0–1		15,000
17	18 November	Kilmarnock	H	5–0	MacLachlan, Connon (2), Rankine (2)	10,000
18	25 November	Partick Thistle	A	1–2	Middleton	12,000
19	2 December	Alloa Athletic	H	1–0	Thomson	11,000
20	9 December	Clyde	H	1–0	Middleton	10,000
21	16 December	St Mirren	A	1–0	Smith	11,000
22	23 December	Airdrieonians	H	0–1		13,000
23	30 December	Rangers	A	1–1	Rankine	22,000
24	1 January	Dundee	H	0–0		23,000
25	2 January	Raith Rovers	A	1–1	Smith	6,000
26	6 January	Celtic	A	2–1	Thomson, Rankine	15,000
27	20 January	Morton	H	1–1	Milne	9,000
28	3 February	Ayr United	H	4–1	Robertson, Thomson (2), Grant	13,000
29	17 February	Partick Thistle	H	0–0		11,000
30	28 February	Falkirk	H	1–1	Rankine	3,500
31	3 March	Hibernian	A	0–2		10,000
32	10 March	Ayr United	A	1–2	Thomson	5,500
33	24 March	Third Lanark	H	1–1	Thomson	11,000
34	31 March	Heart of Midlothian	A	0–0		12,500
35	7 April	Hamilton Academical	A	0–0		4,000
36	14 April	Albion Rovers	H	1–2	Smith	12,000
37	21 April	Clyde	A	1–0	Rankine	5,000
38	28 April	Motherwell	H	2–1	Miller (2)	9,500

==== Final standings ====
Pos	Team	Pld	W	D	L	GF	GA	GD	Pts
3	Celtic	38	19	8	11	52	39	+13	46
4	Falkirk	38	14	17	7	44	32	+12	45
5	Aberdeen	38	15	12	11	46	34	+12	42
6	St Mirren	38	15	12	11	54	44	+10	42
7	Dundee	38	17	7	14	51	45	+6	41

Source: "1922-1923 Division 1 - SPFL Archive". SPFL.

=== Scottish Cup ===
Round	Date	Opponent	H/A	Score	Aberdeen Scorer(s)	Attendance
R1	13 January	Forfar Athletic	H	1–0	Rankine	13,000
R2	27 January	Airdrieonians	A	1–1	Smith	12,000
R2 R	31 January	Airdrieonians	H	2–0	Rankine, Smith	14,500
R3	10 February	Peterhead	H	13–0	Milne (3), Middleton, Thomson (3), Grant (4), Rankine, Smith	3,241
QF	24 February	Hibernian	A	0–2		28,000

== Squad ==
=== Appearances & Goals ===
No.	Pos	Nat	Player	Total		Division One		Scottish Cup	
No.	Pos	Nat	Player	Apps	Goals	Apps	Goals	Apps	Goals
	GK	(England) ENG	Harry Blackwell	43	0	38	0	5	0
	DF	(Scotland) SCO	Duff Bruce	1	0	1	0	0	0
	FW	(Scotland) SCO	Jacky Connon	19	2	15	2	4	0
	FW	(Scotland) SCO	Andy Dick	1	0	1	0	0	0
	FW	(Scotland) SCO	Alf Duggins	2	0	2	0	0	0
	DF	(Scotland) SCO	Matt Forsyth	42	0	37	0	5	0
	FW	(Scotland) SCO	Walter Grant	20	5	19	1	1	4
	MF	(Scotland) SCO	Sandy Grosert	22	0	21	0	1	0
	DF	(Scotland) SCO	Jock Hutton	40	0	35	0	5	0
	MF	(Scotland) SCO	Bert MacLachlan (c)	35	1	31	1	4	0
	DF	(Scotland) SCO	James McBoyle	3	0	3	0	0	0
	MF	(Scotland) SCO	Willie McLeod	1	0	1	0	0	0
	FW	(England) ENG	Billy Middleton	36	4	31	3	5	1
	FW	(Scotland) SCO	Johnny Miller	12	7	12	7	0	0
	MF	(Scotland) SCO	Vic Milne	41	5	36	2	5	3
	FW	(Scotland) SCO	Alec Moir	7	0	7	0	0	0
	FW	(Scotland) SCO	Andy Rankine	43	17	38	14	5	3
	MF	(Scotland) SCO	Arthur Robertson	24	1	19	1	5	0
	FW	(Scotland) SCO	Jimmy Smith	40	7	35	4	5	3
	FW	(Scotland) SCO	Eddie Swan	7	0	7	0	0	0
	FW	(Scotland) SCO	Doug Thomson	34	14	29	11	5	3
