= Andy Rankine =

Scottish footballer

Personal information
- Full name: Andrew Douglas Rankine
- Date of birth: 14 March 1895
- Place of birth: Ballater, Scotland
- Date of death: 13 September 1965 (aged 70)
- Place of death: Aberdeen, Scotland
- Positions: Inside left; centre half

Senior career*
Years	Team	Apps	(Gls)
- Strath
- Banks O' Dee
1920–1924	Aberdeen	136	(33)
1924–1925	Cowdenbeath	46	(7)
1925–1926	Indiana Flooring	27	(2)
1926–1927	Bethlehem Steel	15	(0)
1927–1928	Cowdenbeath	1	(0)
- Keith
- * Club domestic league appearances and goals

Andrew Douglas Rankine (14 March 1895 – 13 September 1965) was a Scottish professional footballer who played as an inside left in the Scottish League for Aberdeen and Cowdenbeath.

== Career statistics ==
Appearances and goals by club, season and competition
Club	Season	League			National Cup		Other		Total	
Club	Season	Division	Apps	Goals	Apps	Goals	Apps	Goals	Apps	Goals
Aberdeen	1920–21	Scottish Division One	30	6	4	0	0	0	34	6
Aberdeen	1921–22	Scottish Division One	33	7	7	1	0	0	40	8
Aberdeen	1922–23	Scottish Division One	38	13	5	3	1 (Note: Appearance in Fleming Charity Shield)	0	44	16
Aberdeen	1923–24	Scottish Division One	24	6	6	1	0	0	30	7
Aberdeen	1924–25	Scottish Division One	11	1	—		—		11	1
Aberdeen	Total		136	33	22	5	1	0	159	38
Cowdenbeath	1924–25	Scottish Division One	24	7	1	0	—		25	7
Cowdenbeath	1925–26	Scottish Division One	22	0	0	0	—		22	0
Cowdenbeath	Total		46	7	1	0	—		47	7
Indiana Flooring	1925–26	American Soccer League	27	2	1	0	—		28	2
Bethlehem Steel	1926–27	American Soccer League	15	0	0	0	—		0	0
Cowdenbeath	1927–28	Scottish Division One	1	0	0	0	—		1	0
Cowdenbeath	Cowdenbeath total		47	7	1	0	—		48	7
Career total			225	42	24	5	1	0	250	47

== Honours ==
Aberdeen

- Fleming Charity Shield: 1923

Individual

- Cowdenbeath Hall of Fame
