= Jacky Connon =

Scottish footballer

Personal information
- Full name: John Lewis Connon
- Date of birth: 21 December 1896
- Place of birth: Aberdeen, Scotland
- Date of death: 28 January 1953 (aged 56)
- Place of death: Aberdeen, Scotland
- Position: Forward

Youth career
- Carlton; Richmond

Senior career*
Years	Team	Apps	(Gls)
1919–1924	Aberdeen	93	(22)
1924–1927	Forfar Athletic	73	(19)
- * Club domestic league appearances and goals

Jacky Connon was a Scottish professional footballer who played in the centre- forward position for Aberdeen.

== History ==
Connon started his career playing for the Aberdeenshire junior clubs of Carlton and then Richmond.

He joined Aberdeen just after the First World War.

He played either inside-right or centre-forward.

He played for Aberdeen till about 1924 then had two seasons with Forfar Athletic.

== Outside of football ==
During the First World War he served with the Royal Artillery.

He became an agency superintendent of the Royal Insurance Company.

His son was Bill Connon, a rugby union player who became President of the Scottish Rugby Union.

== Career statistics ==
Appearances and goals by club, season and competition
Club	Season	League			National Cup		Total	
Club	Season	Division	Apps	Goals	Apps	Goals	Apps	Goals
Aberdeen	1918–19	Scottish Division One	Aberdeen Dropped Out of Competitive Football due to WW1					
Aberdeen	1919–20	Scottish Division One	39	14	4	2	43	16
Aberdeen	1920–21	Scottish Division One	25	5	4	1	29	6
Aberdeen	1921–22	Scottish Division One	13	1	0	0	13	1
Aberdeen	1922–23	Scottish Division One	15	2	4	0	19	2
Aberdeen	1923–24	Scottish Division One	1	0	1	0	2	0
Aberdeen	Total		93	22	13	3	106	25
Forfar Athletic	1924–25	Scottish Division Two	20	5	0	0	20	5
Forfar Athletic	1925–26	Scottish Third Division	21	10	2	2	23	12
Forfar Athletic	1926–27	Scottish Division Two	32	4	1	0	33	4
Forfar Athletic	Total		73	19	3	2	76	21
Career total			166	41	16	5	182	46
