= John Miller (footballer, born 1895) =

Scottish footballer (1895–1956)

Personal information
- Full name: John Galloway Miller
- Date of birth: 12 March 1895
- Place of birth: Motherwell, Scotland
- Date of death: 1956 (aged 60–61)
- Place of death: Stonehouse, Scotland
- Height: 5 ft 9 in (1.75 m)
- Position: Forward

Senior career*
Years	Team	Apps	(Gls)
–	Larkhall Thistle		
–	Blantyre Victoria		
1915–1919	Hamilton Academical	8	(4)
1919–1921	Liverpool	8	(0)
1921–1924	Aberdeen	91	(46)
1924–1926	Partick Thistle	53	(30)
1926–1927	Aberdeen	18	(8)
1927–1928	Clyde	8	(4)
1928–1929	Dunfermline Athletic	30	(13)
1929–1930	Prescot Cables		
1930–1931	Barrow		
1931–1932	Carlisle United		
Total		216+	(105+)
- * Club domestic league appearances and goals

John Galloway Miller (12 March 1895 – 1956) was a Scottish footballer who played as a forward.

He counted Hamilton Academical, Liverpool (8 English Football League appearances as well as a full season during wartime), Partick Thistle and Aberdeen among his clubs.

His elder brothers Tom (who also played for Hamilton Accies and Liverpool, as well as the Scotland national team), William and Adam were also footballers.

== Career statistics ==
Appearances and goals by club, season and competition
Club	Season	League			National Cup		Total	
Club	Season	Division	Apps	Goals	Apps	Goals	Apps	Goals
Hamilton Academical	1915–16	Scottish Division One	8	4	0	0	8	4
Liverpool	1919–20	First Division	8	0	0	0	8	0
Liverpool	1920–21	First Division	0	0	0	0	0	0
Liverpool	Total		8	0	0	0	8	0
Aberdeen	1921–22	Scottish Division One	36	23	7	4	43	27
Aberdeen	1922–23	Scottish Division One	12	8	0	0	12	8
Aberdeen	1923–24	Scottish Division One	35	13	7	3	42	16
Aberdeen	1924–25	Scottish Division One	8	2	0	0	8	2
Aberdeen	Total		91	46	14	7	105	53
Partick Thistle	1924–25	Scottish Division One						
Partick Thistle	1925–26	Scottish Division One						
Partick Thistle	Total		53	30	9	6	62	36
Aberdeen	1926–27	Scottish Division One	18	8	1	0	19	8
Clyde	1927–28	Scottish Division One	8	4	–	–	8+	4+
Dunfermline Athletic	1928–29	Scottish Division Two	30	13	–	–	30+	13+
Prescot Cables	1929–30	Lancashire Combination						
Barrow	1930–31	Third Division North						
Carlisle United	1931–32	Third Division North						
Career total			216+	105+	25+	13+	221+	118+
