= Tom Pirie =

Scottish footballer

Personal information
- Full name: Thomas Stuart Pirie
- Date of birth: 9 December 1896
- Place of birth: Gorbals, Scotland
- Date of death: 14 May 1963 (aged 66)
- Place of death: Aberdeen, Scotland
- Height: 5 ft 11 1/2 in (1.82 m)
- Position: Wing half

Senior career*
Years	Team	Apps	(Gls)
–1919	Battlefield Juniors		
1919–1920	Bathgate		
1920–1923	Queen's Park	93	(3)
1923	Manchester United	0	(0)
1924–1926	Aberdeen	37	(6)
1926–1928	Cardiff City	5	(0)
1928–1929	Bristol Rovers	12	(0)
1929	Brighton & Hove Albion	0	(0)
1929–1930	Ross County		

Managerial career
- 1929–1930: Ross County (player-manager)
- * Club domestic league appearances and goals

Thomas Stuart Pirie (9 December 1896 – 14 May 1963) was a Scottish amateur footballer who played as a wing half the Scottish League for Queen's Park and Aberdeen. He also played in the Football League for Bristol Rovers and Cardiff City. He ended his career with a player-manager spell at Ross County.

== Personal life ==
After retiring from football, Pirie worked as a civil engineer.

== Career statistics ==
Appearances and goals by club, season and competition
Club	Season	League			National Cup		Other		Total	
Club	Season	Division	Apps	Goals	Apps	Goals	Apps	Goals	Apps	Goals
Queen's Park	1920–21	Scottish First Division	27	2	1	0	1 (Note: Appearance in Glasgow Merchants Charity Cup)	0	29	2
Queen's Park	1921–22	Scottish First Division	38	1	2	0	4 (Note: 2 appearances in Glasgow Merchants Charity Cup, 1 appearance in Glasgow Cup, 1 appearance in Lord Provost's Unemployment Fund)	0	44	1
Queen's Park	1922–23	Scottish Second Division	26	0	4	0	3 (Note: 2 appearances in Glasgow Merchants Charity Cup, 1 appearance in Glasgow Cup)	0	33	0
Queen's Park	1923–24	Scottish First Division	2	0	0	0	—		2	0
Queen's Park	Total		93	3	7	0	8	0	108	3
Aberdeen	1924–25	Scottish First Division	12	5	6	5	—		18	10
Aberdeen	1925–26	Scottish First Division	25	1	9	6	—		34	7
Aberdeen	Total		37	6	15	11	—		52	17
Bristol Rovers	1928–29	Third Division South	12	0	2	0	—		14	0
Career total			142	9	24	11	8	0	174	20
