= 1927–28 Heart of Midlothian F.C. season =

Heart of Midlothian
1927–28 season
- Manager: Willie McCartney
- Stadium: Tynecastle Park
- Scottish First Division: 4th
- Scottish Cup: 3rd Round

During the 1927–28 season Hearts competed in the Scottish First Division, the Scottish Cup and the East of Scotland Shield.

== Fixtures ==
=== Scottish Cup ===
21 January 1928 Scottish Cup R1	Hearts	2–2	St Johnstone	Tynecastle Park
				Attendance: 28,000

25 January 1928 Scottish Cup R1 Replay	St Johnstone	0–1	Hearts	Muirton Park
				Attendance: 11,400

4 February 1928 Scottish Cup R2	Hearts	7–0	Forres Mechanics	Tynecastle Park
				Attendance: 17,000

18 February 1928 Scottish Cup R3	Hearts	1–2	Motherwell	Tynecastle Park
				Attendance: 42,000

=== Scottish First Division ===
13 August 1927 Scottish First Division	Hearts	0–1	Kilmarnock	Tynecastle Park
				Attendance: 21,500

20 August 1927 Scottish First Division	Rangers	4–1	Hearts	Tynecastle Park
				Attendance: 25,000

27 August 1927 Scottish First Division	Hearts	5–0	Clyde	Tynecastle Park
				Attendance: 17,500

3 September 1927 Scottish First Division	Hamilton Academical	1–6	Hearts	Douglas Park
				Attendance: 5,000

10 September 1927 Scottish First Division	Hearts	6–0	Dunfermline Athletic	Tynecastle Park
				Attendance: 18,000

17 September 1927 Scottish First Division	Queen's Park	0–2	Hearts	Hampden Park
				Attendance: 8,000

24 September 1927 Scottish First Division	Hearts	2–0	Raith Rovers	Tynecastle Park
				Attendance: 21,500

1 October 1927 Scottish First Division	Falkirk	1–3	Hearts	Brockville Park
				Attendance: 8,000

8 October 1927 Scottish First Division	Hearts	1–0	Dundee	Tynecastle Park
				Attendance: 22,500

15 October 1927 Scottish First Division	Hibernian	2–1	Hearts	Easter Road
				Attendance: 31,000

22 October 1927 Scottish First Division	Hearts	0–0	Motherwell	Tynecastle Park
				Attendance: 14,500

29 October 1927 Scottish First Division	Partick Thistle	1–3	Hearts	Firhill Park
				Attendance: 10,000

5 November 1927 Scottish First Division	St Mirren	2–0	Hearts	St Mirren Park, Love Street
				Attendance: 7,000

12 November 1927 Scottish First Division	Hearts	2–2	Celtic	Tynecastle Park
				Attendance: 34,000

19 November 1927 Scottish First Division	Hearts	3–0	Aberdeen	Tynecastle Park
				Attendance: 14,500

26 November 1927 Scottish First Division	St Johnstone	2–3	Hearts	Muirton Park
				Attendance: 7,000

3 December 1927 Scottish First Division	Hearts	5–0	Bo'ness	Tynecastle Park
				Attendance: 17,000

10 December 1927 Scottish First Division	Airdrieonians	2–0	Hearts	Broomfield Park
				Attendance: 4,000

17 December 1927 Scottish First Division	Hearts	2–3	Cowdenbeath	Tynecastle Park
				Attendance: 12,000

24 December 1927 Scottish First Division	Kilmarnock	5–0	Hearts	Rugby Park
				Attendance: 6,000

31 December 1927 Scottish First Division	Hearts	2–1	Hamilton Academical	Tynecastle Park
				Attendance: 15,000

2 January 1928 Scottish First Division	Hearts	2–2	Hibernian	Tynecastle Park
				Attendance: 36,000

3 January 1928 Scottish First Division	Dunfermline Athletic	0–2	Hearts	East End Park
				Attendance: 4,000

7 January 1928 Scottish First Division	Clyde	2–2	Hearts	Shawfield Stadium
				Attendance: 5,000

14 January 1928 Scottish First Division	Hearts	4–2	Queen's Parke	Tynecastle Park
				Attendance: 12,000

28 January 1928 Scottish First Division	Dundee	2–7	Hearts	Dens Park
				Attendance: 6,000

8 February 1928 Scottish First Division	Hearts	9–3	Falkirk	Tynecastle Park
				Attendance: 8,500

11 February 1928 Scottish First Division	Raith Rovers	3–0	Hearts	Tynecastle Park
				Attendance: 15,000

22 February 1928 Scottish First Division	Hearts	1–2	Partick Thistle	Tynecastle Park
				Attendance: 7,000

25 February 1928 Scottish First Division	Motherwell	0–3	Hearts	Fir Park
				Attendance: 6,000

7 March 1928 Scottish First Division	Hearts	0–0	Rangers	Ibrox Park
				Attendance: 6,000

10 March 1928 Scottish First Division	Hearts	2–1	St Mirren	Tynecastle Park
				Attendance: 11,500

17 March 1928 Scottish First Division	Celtic	2–1	Hearts	Celtic Park
				Attendance: 12,000

24 March 1928 Scottish First Division	Aberdeen	2–0	Hearts	Pittodrie Park
				Attendance: 9,500

31 March 1928 Scottish First Division	Hearts	0–2	St Johnstone	Tynecastle Park
				Attendance: 9,500

7 April 1928 Scottish First Division	Bo'ness	2–2	Hearts	Newtown Park
				Attendance: 3,000

14 April 1928 Scottish First Division	Hearts	1–1	Airdrieonians	Tynecastle Park
				Attendance: 7,000

21 April 1928 Scottish First Division	Cowdenbeath	0–1	Hearts	Central Park
				Attendance: 3,000

== See also ==
- List of Heart of Midlothian F.C. seasons
