= Duff Bruce =

Scottish footballer (1898–1972)

Personal information
- Full name: Duff Morrison Bruce
- Date of birth: 27 August 1898
- Place of birth: Aberdeen, Scotland
- Date of death: 1972 (aged 74)
- Place of death: Aberdeen, Scotland
- Height: 5 ft 9 1/2 in (1.77 m)
- Position: Left back

Senior career*
Years	Team	Apps	(Gls)
1920–1922	Charlton Athletic	0	(0)
1922–1928	Aberdeen	96	(0)
1928–1929	Charlton Athletic	0	(0)
1929	Brechin City	5	(0)
1930	Forres Mechanics		
- * Club domestic league appearances and goals

Duff Morrison Bruce MM (27 August 1898 – 1972) was a Scottish professional footballer who played in the Scottish League for Aberdeen and Brechin City as a left back.

== Personal life ==
Bruce was born in Aberdeen and moved to New Cross in 1910. He served in the Royal Horse Artillery during the First World War and saw action at the Somme, Arras, Vimy Ridge and Messines on the Western Front. His unit subsequently moved to the Italian front and he spent two months out of the frontline with scabies in early 1918. Despite a poor disciplinary record, which saw him demoted from lance bombardier to gunner, Bruce won the Military Medal during the course of his service. His career was effectively ended in 1928, when he lost an eye during a brawl at a coffee stall in Aberdeen. After his retirement from football, Bruce lived with his wife in Milltimber and worked as an engineer.

== Career statistics ==
Appearances and goals by club, season and competition
Club	Season	League			National Cup		Other		Total	
Club	Season	Division	Apps	Goals	Apps	Goals	Apps	Goals	Apps	Goals
Aberdeen	1922–23	Scottish First Division	1	0	0	0	0	0	1	0
Aberdeen	1923–24	Scottish First Division	5	0	0	0	0	0	5	0
Aberdeen	1924–25	Scottish First Division	14	0	6	0	0	0	20	0
Aberdeen	1925–26	Scottish First Division	34	0	8	0	0	0	42	0
Aberdeen	1926–27	Scottish First Division	32	0	1	0	2 (Note: Appearances in Dewar Shield)	0	35	0
Aberdeen	1927–28	Scottish First Division	9	0	0	0	0	0	9	0
Aberdeen	Total		95	0	15	0	2	0	112	0
Brechin City	1929–30	Scottish Second Division	5	0	―		―		5	0
Career total			100	0	15	0	2	0	117	0

== Honours ==
Aberdeen

- Dewar Shield: 1926
