= Douglas Thomson (footballer) =

Scottish footballer

Personal information
- Full name: Douglas Thomson
- Date of birth: 10 August 1891
- Place of birth: Dundee, Scotland
- Height: 5 ft 9 in (1.75 m)
- Position: Inside forward

Senior career*
| Years | Team | Apps | (Gls) |
| 1911–1912 | Dundee Violet | | |
| 1912–1913 | Minnedosa | | |
| 1913–1914 | Winnipeg Scottish | | |
| 1914–1919 | Dundee Hibernian | | |
| 1919–1920 | Millwall Athletic | | |
| 1920–1923 | Aberdeen | 95 | (28) |
| 1923–1924 | Grimsby Town | 25 | (3) |
| 1924–192? | Dartford | | |
- * Club domestic league appearances and goals

Douglas Thomson (born 10 August 1891) was a Scottish professional footballer who played as an inside forward.

== Career statistics ==
Appearances and goals by club, season and competition
| Club | Seasons | League | | | National Cup | | Total | |
| Club | Seasons | Division | Apps | Goals | Apps | Goals | Apps | Goals |
|---|---|---|---|---|---|---|---|---|
| Aberdeen | 1920-21 | Scottish Division One | 36 | 7 | 0 | 0 | 36 | 7 |
| Aberdeen | 1921-22 | Scottish Division One | 30 | 10 | 7 | 2 | 37 | 12 |
| Aberdeen | 1922-23 | Scottish Division One | 29 | 11 | 5 | 3 | 34 | 14 |
| Aberdeen | Total | | 95 | 28 | 12 | 5 | 107 | 33 |
