= 1924–25 Aberdeen F.C. season =

Aberdeen F.C.
1924–25 season
- Chairman: William Philip
- Manager: Paddy Travers
- Scottish Football League Division One: 15th
- Scottish Cup: Fourth round
- Top goalscorer: League: Wattie Jackson (13); All: Wattie Jackson (13)
- Highest home attendance: 25,257 vs. Motherwell, 21 February 1925
- Lowest home attendance: 6,000 vs. Hamilton Academical, 1 April 1925

The 1924–25 season was Aberdeen's 20th season in the top flight of Scottish football and their 21st season. The club competed in Scottish Football League Division One and Scottish Cup in season 1924–25.

== Overview ==
Aberdeen began the 1924–25 season with their second manager in charge, after Jimmy Philip resigned in the summer. Former player Paddy Travers was appointed as the new manager. Aberdeen finished 15th in Division One, just two points clear of relegation. In the Scottish Cup, they lost in the fourth round to Hamilton Academical at Pittodrie.

== Results ==
=== Scottish Division One ===
Match Day	Date	Opponent	H/A	Score	Aberdeen Scorer(s)	Attendance
1	16 August	Falkirk	A	0–2		10,000
2	23 August	Rangers	H	0–1		18,000
3	30 August	Ayr United	A	3–3	Alex Jackson, Wattie Jackson (2, 1 pen))	6,000
4	6 September	Celtic	H	0–4		24,000
5	13 September	Hamilton Academical	A	1–2	Wattie Jackson	6,000
6	20 September	Cowdenbeath	H	3–0	Wattie Jackson (3)	10,000
7	22 September	Morton	H	0–1		14,000
8	27 September	Partick Thistle	A	4–1	Alex Jackson (2), Wattie Jackson (2)	12,000
9	29 September	Queen's Park	H	3–1	Paton, Wattie Jackson, Miller	6,000
10	4 October	Airdrieonians	H	1–2	Miller	15,000
11	11 October	Motherwell	A	2–1	Paton, Wattie Jackson	6,500
12	18 October	Dundee	H	0–0		18,000
13	25 October	Third Lanark	A	0–4		6,000
14	1 November	St Johnstone	H	2–1	Alex Jackson, Rankin	12,000
15	8 November	Heart of Midlothian	A	1–1	Paton	18,000
16	15 November	St Mirren	H	2–3	Edward (2)	12,000
17	22 November	Hibernian	A	1–4	Paton	13,000
18	29 November	Kilmarnock	H	0–0		12,000
19	6 December	Raith Rovers	A	2–2	Cosgrove, Wattie Jackson	6,000
20	13 December	Morton	A	1–1	Cosgrove	5,000
21	20 December	Third Lanark	H	3–1	Alex Jackson (2), Smith	12,000
22	27 December	St Johnstone	A	1–1	Bowie	6,000
23	1 January	Dundee	A	0–2		13,000
24	3 January	Falkirk	H	1–1	Bowie	12,000
25	5 January	Hibernian	H	0–1		13,000
26	10 January	Celtic	A	1–3	McStay	6,000
27	17 January	Partick Thistle	H	2–0	Pirie (2)	15,000
28	31 January	Kilmarnock	A	1–0	Pirie	5,500
29	14 February	Airdrieonians	A	0–0		4,000
30	28 February	Raith Rovers	H	2–3	Wattie Jackson, Pirie	9,000
31	3 March	St Mirren	A	3–1	Alex Jackson, Bruce, Pirie	5,000
32	18 March	Ayr United	H	0–1		8,000
33	28 March	Cowdenbeath	A	1–2	Bruce	7,500
34	1 April	Hamilton Academical	H	2–0	Alex Jackson, Smith	6,000
35	4 April	Heart of Midlothian	H	0–0		10,000
36	7 April	Rangers	A	0–2		8,000
37	11 April	Queen's Park	A	1–4	Smith	10,000
38	25 April	Motherwell	H	2–0	Jimmy Jackson, Wattie Jackson	15,000

==== Final standings ====
Pos	Team	Pld	W	D	L	GF	GA	GD	Pts
13	Hamilton Academical	38	15	3	20	50	63	−13	33
14	Morton	38	12	9	17	46	69	−23	33
15	Aberdeen	38	11	10	17	46	56	−10	32
16	Falkirk	38	12	8	18	44	54	−10	32
17	Queen's Park	38	11	9	18	50	72	−22	31

=== Scottish Cup ===
Round	Date	Opponent	H/A	Score	Aberdeen Scorer(s)	Attendance
R1	24 January	Hibernian	A	2–0	Pirie (2)	20,000
R2	7 February	Armadale	A	1–1	Pirie	7,000
R2 R	11 February	Armadale	H	2–0	Pirie (2)	15,000
R3	21 February	Motherwell	H	0–0		25,257
R3 R	25 February	Motherwell	A	2–1	Jimmy Jackson, Craig	12,000
R4	7 March	Hamilton Academical	H	0–2		24,157

== Squad ==
=== Appearances & Goals ===
No.	Pos	Nat	Player	Total		Division One		Scottish Cup	
No.	Pos	Nat	Player	Apps	Goals	Apps	Goals	Apps	Goals
	FW	(Scotland) SCO	Matt Armstrong	2	0	2	0	0	0
	GK	(England) ENG	Harry Blackwell	43	0	37	0	6	0
	FW	(Scotland) SCO	Alec Bowie	6	2	6	2	0	0
	DF	(Scotland) SCO	Duff Bruce	20	0	14	0	6	0
	FW	(Scotland) SCO	Bobbie Bruce	22	2	16	2	6	0
	FW	(Scotland) SCO	Mike Cosgrove	5	2	5	2	0	0
	GK	(Scotland) SCO	Joe Cunningham	1	0	1	0	0	0
	MF	(Scotland) SCO	Stewart Davidson	6	0	6	0	0	0
	MF	(Scotland) SCO	Jock Edward	29	2	25	2	4	0
	FW	(Scotland) SCO	Charles Forbes	1	0	1	0	0	0
	DF	(Scotland) SCO	Matt Forsyth	39	0	33	0	6	0
	FW	(Scotland) SCO	Walter Grant	7	0	7	0	0	0
	DF	(Scotland) SCO	Jock Hutton	38	0	32	0	6	0
	FW	(Scotland) SCO	Alex Jackson	39	8	33	8	6	0
	MF	(Scotland) SCO	Jimmy Jackson	36	2	34	1	2	1
	FW	(Scotland) SCO	Wattie Jackson	43	13	37	13	6	0
	FW	(Scotland) SCO	Willie 'WK' Jackson	6	0	6	0	0	0
	MF	(Scotland) SCO	Bert MacLachlan (c)	41	0	35	0	6	0
	FW	(Scotland) SCO	Robert Main	2	0	2	0	0	0
	FW	(Scotland) SCO	Johnny Miller	8	2	8	2	0	0
	FW	(Scotland) SCO	Johnny Paton	17	4	17	4	0	0
	FW	(Scotland) SCO	Tom Pirie	18	10	12	5	6	5
	FW	(Scotland) SCO	Andy Rankine	11	1	11	1	0	0
	FW	(Scotland) SCO	Jimmy Smith	43	3	37	3	6	0
	DF	(Scotland) SCO	Ken Sutherland	1	0	1	0	0	0
