= 1923–24 Aberdeen F.C. season =

Aberdeen F.C.
1923–24 season
- Chairman: William Philip
- Manager: Jimmy Philip
- Scottish Football League Division One: 13th
- Scottish Cup: Semi final
- Top goalscorer: League: Johnny Miller (14); All: Johnny Miller (17)
- Highest home attendance: 19,000 vs. Dundee, 1 September 1923
- Lowest home attendance: 5,000 vs Airdrieonians, 1 March 1924

Aberdeen F.C. competed in Scottish Football League Division One and Scottish Cup in season 1923–24.

== Overview ==
Aberdeen finished in 13th place in Scottish Division One in 1923–24. The top scorer was Johnny Miller, with 14 goals from 35 league appearances. In the Scottish Cup, Aberdeen reached the semi-finals, only to lose out to Hibernian after two replays.

== Results ==
=== Scottish Division One ===
| Match Day | Date | Opponent | H/A | Score | Aberdeen Scorer(s) | Attendance |
|---|---|---|---|---|---|---|
| 1 | 18 August | Clydebank | H | 3–1 | Miller, Smith (2) | 14,000 |
| 2 | 25 August | Hibernian | A | 1–0 | Thomson | 18,000 |
| 3 | 1 September | Dundee | H | 0–0 | | 19,000 |
| 4 | 8 September | Ayr United | A | 1–1 | Jackson | 5,000 |
| 5 | 15 September | Morton | H | 0–2 | | 14,000 |
| 6 | 22 September | Rangers | A | 0–2 | | 20,000 |
| 7 | 24 September | Queen's Park | H | 1–1 | Moir | 16,000 |
| 8 | 29 September | Celtic | H | 0–2 | | 18,000 |
| 9 | 6 October | Falkirk | A | 0–0 | | 9,000 |
| 10 | 13 October | Hamilton Academical | H | 2–0 | Miller, Rankine | 9,000 |
| 11 | 20 October | Third Lanark | A | 1–2 | Smith | 10,000 |
| 12 | 27 October | Motherwell | H | 3–1 | Miller (3) | 7,000 |
| 13 | 3 November | Kilmarnock | A | 1–2 | Rankine | 5,000 |
| 14 | 10 November | Partick Thistle | H | 2–1 | Mutch, Miller | 14,000 |
| 15 | 17 November | St Mirren | A | 0–2 | | 6,500 |
| 16 | 24 November | Clyde | A | 0–1 | | 8,000 |
| 17 | 1 December | Raith Rovers | H | 1–0 | Rankine | 14,000 |
| 18 | 8 December | Heart of Midlothian | A | 1–0 | Miller | 18,000 |
| 19 | 15 December | Falkirk | H | 0–0 | | 11,000 |
| 20 | 22 December | Airdrieonians | A | 1–2 | Miller | 5,000 |
| 21 | 29 December | Clyde | H | 3–0 | Moir, Smith (2) | 9,000 |
| 22 | 1 January | Dundee | A | 1–1 | Miller | 17,000 |
| 23 | 2 January | Hibernian | H | 1–1 | Grant | 11,000 |
| 24 | 5 January | Heart of Midlothian | H | 2–1 | Miller, Grant | 16,000 |
| 25 | 12 January | Ayr United | H | 1–0 | Paton | 10,500 |
| 26 | 19 January | Celtic | A | 0–4 | | 17,000 |
| 27 | 2 February | St Mirren | H | 2–0 | MacLachlan, Rankine | 11,000 |
| 28 | 13 February | Third Lanark | H | 2–2 | Rankine, Brown | 7,000 |
| 29 | 16 February | Raith Rovers | A | 0–1 | | 6,000 |
| 30 | 27 February | Morton | A | 1–1 | Smith | 1,500 |
| 31 | 1 March | Airdrieonians | H | 1–2 | Miller | 5,000 |
| 32 | 12 March | Hamilton Academical | A | 0–3 | | 2,500 |
| 33 | 19 March | Rangers | H | 1–0 | Rankine | 16,000 |
| 34 | 29 March | Partick Thistle | A | 0–1 | | 8,000 |
| 35 | 2 April | Motherwell | A | 1–1 | Miller | 2,000 |
| 36 | 5 April | Queen's Park | A | 0–1 | | 4,000 |
| 37 | 12 April | Clydebank | A | 1–2 | Grant | 2,500 |
| 38 | 19 April | Kilmarnock | H | 2–0 | Miller, Smith | 10,500 |

==== Final standings ====
| Pos | Team | Pld | W | D | L | GF | GA | GD | Pts |
|---|---|---|---|---|---|---|---|---|---|
| 11 | Morton | 38 | 16 | 5 | 17 | 48 | 54 | −6 | 37 |
| 12 | Hamilton Academical | 38 | 15 | 6 | 17 | 52 | 57 | −5 | 36 |
| 13 | Aberdeen | 38 | 13 | 10 | 15 | 37 | 41 | −4 | 36 |
| 14 | Ayr United | 38 | 12 | 10 | 16 | 38 | 60 | −22 | 34 |
| 15 | Falkirk | 38 | 13 | 6 | 19 | 46 | 53 | −7 | 32 |

Source: "1923-1924 Division 1 - SPFL Archive". SPFL (in Malay).

=== Scottish Cup ===
| Round | Date | Opponent | H/A | Score | Aberdeen Scorer(s) | Attendance |
|---|---|---|---|---|---|---|
| R1 | 26 January | Dumbarton | H | 2–1 | Jackson, Miller | 12,500 |
| R2 | 9 February | Cowdenbeath | A | 2–0 | Jackson, Grant | 17,000 |
| R3 | 23 February | East Stirlingshire | H | 2–0 | Miller (2) | 13,000 |
| QF | 8 March | St Bernard's | H | 3–0 | Jackson (2), Paton | 17,000 |
| SF | 22 March | Hibernian | N | 0–0 | | 20,000 |
| SF R | 26 March | Hibernian | N | 0–0 | | 18,000 |
| SF 2R | 9 April | Hibernian | N | 0–1 | | 12,000 |

== Squad ==
=== Appearances & Goals ===
| No. | Pos | Nat | Player | Total | | Division One | | Scottish Cup | |
| No. | Pos | Nat | Player | Apps | Goals | Apps | Goals | Apps | Goals |
|---|---|---|---|---|---|---|---|---|---|
| | FW | (Scotland) SCO | Matt Armstrong | 5 | 0 | 5 | 0 | 0 | 0 |
| | GK | (England) ENG | Harry Blackwell | 45 | 0 | 38 | 0 | 7 | 0 |
| | DF | (Scotland) SCO | Duff Bruce | 5 | 0 | 5 | 0 | 0 | 0 |
| | FW | (Scotland) SCO | Jacky Connon | 2 | 0 | 1 | 0 | 1 | 0 |
| | MF | (Scotland) SCO | Stewart Davidson | 31 | 0 | 25 | 0 | 6 | 0 |
| | MF | (Scotland) SCO | Andy Dick | 11 | 0 | 10 | 0 | 1 | 0 |
| | FW | (Scotland) SCO | Charles Forbes | 3 | 0 | 3 | 0 | 0 | 0 |
| | DF | (Scotland) SCO | Matt Forsyth | 38 | 0 | 31 | 0 | 7 | 0 |
| | FW | (Scotland) SCO | Walter Grant | 44 | 4 | 37 | 3 | 7 | 1 |
| | DF | (Scotland) SCO | Jock Hutton | 39 | 0 | 32 | 0 | 7 | 0 |
| | MF | (Scotland) SCO | Jimmy Jackson | 40 | 5 | 33 | 1 | 7 | 4 |
| | MF | (Scotland) SCO | Bert MacLachlan (c) | 45 | 1 | 38 | 1 | 7 | 0 |
| | MF | (Scotland) SCO | James Boyle | 8 | 0 | 8 | 0 | 0 | 0 |
| | FW | (Scotland) SCO | Johnny Miller | 42 | 17 | 35 | 14 | 7 | 3 |
| | FW | (Scotland) SCO | Alec Moir | 21 | 2 | 21 | 2 | 0 | 0 |
| | FW | (Scotland) SCO | Allan Mutch | 6 | 1 | 6 | 1 | 0 | 0 |
| | FW | (Scotland) SCO | Johnny Paton | 23 | 2 | 16 | 1 | 7 | 1 |
| | FW | (Scotland) SCO | Andy Rankine | 30 | 7 | 24 | 6 | 6 | 1 |
| | FW | (Scotland) SCO | George Ritchie | 1 | 0 | 1 | 0 | 0 | 0 |
| | FW | (Scotland) SCO | Jimmy Smith | 42 | 7 | 35 | 7 | 7 | 0 |
| | FW | (Scotland) SCO | Tom Spalding | 1 | 0 | 1 | 0 | 0 | 0 |
| | FW | (Scotland) SCO | Ken Sutherland | 2 | 0 | 2 | 0 | 0 | 0 |
| | FW | (Scotland) SCO | Dan Thomson | 11 | 1 | 11 | 1 | 0 | 0 |
