= Walter Grant (Scottish footballer) =

Scottish footballer

Personal information
- Date of birth: 2 August 1893
- Place of birth: Aberdeen
- Date of death: Swanley, Kent, England
- Place of death: 1940 (aged 46 or 47)
- Position: Midfielder

Senior career*
Years	Team	Apps	(Gls)
1915–1925	Aberdeen	91	(7)
1925–1926	Raith Rovers		
1926–1928	Crystal Palace	21	(5)
- * Club domestic league appearances and goals

Walter A. Grant was a Scottish professional football midfielder who played for Scottish clubs Aberdeen and Raith Rovers, and English club Crystal Palace.

Grant joined Aberdeen in 1915. His career was interrupted by the Great War in 1916, but resumed in 1919. He played exactly 100 games for Aberdeen before leaving to join Raith Rovers in 1925. After leaving Raith Rovers, he signed for Crystal Palace in 1926 and spent two seasons there before leaving in 1928.

== Career statistics ==
Club	Season	League			National Cup		Total	
Club	Season	Division	Apps	Goals	Apps	Goals	Apps	Goals
Aberdeen	1915-16	Scottish Division One	15	1	-	-	15	1
Aberdeen	1919-20	Scottish Division One	6	0	1	0	7	0
Aberdeen	1920-21	Scottish Division One	2	1	0	0	2	1
Aberdeen	1921-22	Scottish Division One	5	1	0	0	5	1
Aberdeen	1922-23	Scottish Division One	19	1	1	4	20	5
Aberdeen	1923-24	Scottish Division One	37	3	7	1	44	4
Aberdeen	1924-25	Scottish Division One	7	0	0	0	7	0
Aberdeen	Total		91	7	9	5	100	12
