= Adam Miller (footballer, born 1887) =

Scottish footballer

Personal information
- Full name: Adam Galloway Miller
- Date of birth: 21 October 1887
- Place of birth: Motherwell, Scotland
- Date of death: 1972 (aged 84–85)
- Place of death: Larkhall, Scotland
- Position: Left back

Senior career*
| Years | Team | Apps | (Gls) |
| – | Larkhall United | | |
| 1910–1916 | Hamilton Academical | 166 | (0) |
| 1916 | Royal Albert | | |
| 1916–1920 | Hamilton Academical | 81 | (0) |
| 1920 | → St Mirren (loan) | | |
| 1920–1922 | St Mirren | 10 | (0) |
| 1922–1923 | Johnstone | 10 | (0) |
| Total | | 267 | (0) |
- * Club domestic league appearances and goals

Adam Galloway Miller (21 October 1887 – 1972) was a Scottish footballer who played as a left back, primarily for Hamilton Academical.

He played in the 1911 Scottish Cup Final which Accies lost to Celtic after a replay. He also played in the Scottish Football League for St Mirren and Johnstone. At representative level, he was selected for Lanarkshire at both junior and senior grades, and was twice a reserve for the Scottish Football League XI.

Miller had three brothers who were also footballers, all playing for Hamilton Academical at some point: William had a short career, but John had productive spells with Aberdeen and Partick Thistle, while Tom was a regular with Liverpool and was capped three times for Scotland.
