= Matt Forsyth =

Scottish footballer

Personal information
- Full name: John Matthew Forsyth
- Date of birth: 14 November 1896
- Place of birth: Cathcart, Lanarkshire, Scotland
- Date of death: 28 April 1979 (aged 82)
- Place of death: Aberdeen, Scotland
- Height: 5 ft 8 in (1.73 m)
- Position: Defender

Youth career
- Shotts Battlefield
- Hampden

Senior career*
Years	Team	Apps	(Gls)
- Glasgow Perthshire
1920–1926	Aberdeen	161	(0)
1923	→ Dumbarton Harp (loan)	1	(0)
1926–1928	Forres Mechanics		
1928–1929	Keith		
- * Club domestic league appearances and goals

John Matthew Forsyth (14 November 1896 – 28 April 1979) was a Scottish professional footballer who played as a defender, mainly for Aberdeen.

Forsyth joined Aberdeen in 1920 from Junior club Glasgow Perthshire. After almost 200 appearances, he left the club in 1926. Forsyth was one of Aberdeen's first recipients of a benefit game, a 4–4 draw against a former Aberdeen select in 1926.

He was accused of assault in 1938, though a court found the charge to be not proven.

Forsyth died on 28 April 1979, aged 82, at Woodend Hospital in Aberdeen.

== Career statistics ==
Appearances and goals by club, season and competition
Club	Season	League			Scottish Cup		Total	
Club	Season	Division	Apps	Goals	Apps	Goals	Apps	Goals
Aberdeen	1920–21	Scottish Division One	23	0	0	0	23	0
Aberdeen	1921–22	Scottish Division One	35	0	6	0	41	0
Aberdeen	1922–23	Scottish Division One	37	0	5	0	42	0
Aberdeen	1923–24	Scottish Division One	31	0	7	0	38	0
Aberdeen	1924–25	Scottish Division One	33	0	6	0	39	0
Aberdeen	1925–26	Scottish Division One	2	0	0	0	2	0
Aberdeen	Total		161	0	24	0	185	0
