= Vic Milne =

Scottish-born English footballer

Personal information
- Full name: Victor Edward Milne
- Date of birth: 22 June 1897
- Place of birth: Aberdeen, Scotland
- Date of death: 6 September 1971 (aged 74)
- Place of death: Sutton Coldfield, England
- Height: 6 ft 1 in (1.85 m)
- Position: Defender

Senior career*
Years	Team	Apps	(Gls)
1920–1923	Aberdeen	110	(3)
1923–1929	Aston Villa	156	(1)
Total		266	(4)
- * Club domestic league appearances and goals

Victor Edward Milne M.B., CH.B, D.P.H (22 June 1897 – 6 September 1971), was a professional footballer who is best known for his time with Aston Villa. Before playing for Villa, Milne played for Aberdeen. Milne was the son of the first chairman of Aberdeen and a qualified doctor by the time he joined Villa.

Milne retired from football while still at Villa and went on to be club doctor and a local GP.

== Career statistics ==
Appearances and goals by club, season and competition
Club	Season	League			National Cup		Total	
Club	Season	Division	Apps	Goals	Apps	Goals	Apps	Goals
Aberdeen	1919–20	Scottish Division One	6	0	0	0	6	0
Aberdeen	1920–21	Scottish Division One	31	1	0	0	31	1
Aberdeen	1921–22	Scottish Division One	37	0	7	1	44	1
Aberdeen	1922–23	Scottish Division One	36	2	5	3	41	5
Aberdeen	Total		110	3	12	4	122	7
Aston Villa	1923–24	First Division	24	0	6	0	30	0
Aston Villa	1924–25	First Division	21	0	4	0	25	0
Aston Villa	1925–26	First Division	24	1	4	0	28	1
Aston Villa	1926–27	First Division	34	0	1	0	35	0
Aston Villa	1927–28	First Division	37	0	3	0	40	0
Aston Villa	1928–29	First Division	16	0	0	0	16	0
Aston Villa	Total		156	1	18	0	174	1
Career total			266	4	30	4	296	8

== Honours ==
Aston Villa

- FA Cup runner-up: 1923–24
