= Jock Hutton =

Scottish footballer

Personal information
- Full name: John Douglas Hutton
- Date of birth: 29 October 1898
- Place of birth: Motherwell, Scotland
- Date of death: 2 January 1970 (aged 71)
- Place of death: Belfast, Northern Ireland
- Height: 5 ft 9 in (1.75 m)
- Position: Defender

Youth career
- Motherwell Hearts

Senior career*
Years	Team	Apps	(Gls)
- Larkhall Thistle
- Hall Russell
1918–1919	Bellshill Athletic		
1919–1926	Aberdeen	239	(13)
1926–1933	Blackburn Rovers	128	(4)
Total		367	(17)

International career
1923–1928	Scotland	10	(1)
1923–1925	Scottish League XI	4	(0)

Managerial career
- Linfield
- * Club domestic league appearances and goals

John Douglas Hutton (29 October 1898 – 2 January 1970) was a Scottish footballer who played as a right back for Aberdeen and Blackburn Rovers, and represented the Scotland national team in ten official internationals between 1923 and 1928.

== Career ==
Hutton signed for Aberdeen after the First World War in 1919 and made his debut for the Dons in the same year; originally played at inside forward but switched to full-back. In the 1920s, he was Aberdeen's most-capped player with seven of his ten caps coming while he played for the club.

In October 1926, he joined English club Blackburn Rovers for a then-record £6,000 transfer fee. Hutton won an FA Cup winner's medal in 1928, when Blackburn beat Huddersfield Town 3–1 at Wembley.

Hutton won ten caps for the Scotland national football team and scored one goal, from a penalty kick in a 2–2 draw against Wales in the 1928 British Home Championship. He also represented the Scottish League XI four times.

Hutton managed Belfast club Linfield during the 1940s. During his time in charge, Hutton signed Tommy Dickson for Linfield.

== Career statistics ==
=== Club ===
Appearances and goals by club, season and competition
Club	Season	League			National Cup		Total	
Club	Season	Division	Apps	Goals	Apps	Goals	Apps	Goals
Bellshill Athletic	1918–19	-	-	-	-	-	-	-
Aberdeen	1919–20	Scottish Division One	38	5	4	1	42	6
Aberdeen	1920–21	Scottish Division One	28	1	4	0	32	1
Aberdeen	1921–22	Scottish Division One	29	0	6	0	35	0
Aberdeen	1922–23	Scottish Division One	35	0	5	0	40	0
Aberdeen	1923–24	Scottish Division One	32	0	7	0	39	0
Aberdeen	1924–25	Scottish Division One	32	0	6	0	38	0
Aberdeen	1925–26	Scottish Division One	35	2	9	3	44	5
Aberdeen	1926–27	Scottish Division One	10	5	0	0	10	5
Aberdeen	Total		239	13	41	4	280	17
Blackburn Rovers	1926–27	First Division	17	0	-	-	17+	0+
Blackburn Rovers	1927–28	First Division	37	0	1+	0+	38+	0+
Blackburn Rovers	1928–29	First Division	14	0	-	-	14+	0+
Blackburn Rovers	1929–30	First Division	18	3	-	-	18+	3+
Blackburn Rovers	1930–31	First Division	22	0	-	-	22+	0+
Blackburn Rovers	1931–32	First Division	20	1	-	-	20+	1+
Blackburn Rovers	Total		128	4	1+	0+	129+	4+
Career total			367	17	42+	4+	409+	21+

=== International ===
Appearances and goals by national team and year
National team	Year	Apps	Goals
Scotland	1923	3	0
Scotland	1924	1	0
Scotland	1925	1	0
Scotland	1926	2	0
Scotland	1927	2	1
Scotland	1928	1	0
Total		10	1

Scores and results list Scotland's goal tally first, score column indicates score after each Hutton goal

List of international goals scored by Jock Hutton
No.	Date	Venue	Opponent	Score	Result	Competition
1	29 October 1927	Racecourse Ground, Wrexham, Wales	Wales	2–0	2–2	1928 British Home Championship

== Honours ==
Blackburn Rovers

- FA Cup: 1927–28

== See also ==
- List of Scotland national football team captains
