= David Gibson (footballer, born 1895) =

Scottish footballer (1895-1964)

Personal information
- Date of birth: 29 September 1895
- Place of birth: Kilmarnock, Scotland
- Date of death: 26 September 1964 (aged 68)
- Place of death: Kilmarnock, Scotland
- Position: Left back

Senior career*
| Years | Team | Apps | (Gls) |
- Shawfield
| 1919–1925 | Kilmarnock | 236 | (1) |
| 1925–1926 | Preston North End | 13 | (0) |
| 1926–1927 | Springfield Babes | 13 | (0) |
| 1927 | → Falkirk (loan) | 0 | (0) |
| 1927–1928 | Fall River | 41 | (0) |
| 1928–1931 | Providence | 117 | (0) |
| 1931 | Fall River | 11 | (0) |
| 1932–1934 | Queen of the South | | |
| 1934–1935 | Galston | | |
| Total | | 390 | (1) |
- * Club domestic league appearances and goals

David Gibson (29 September 1895 – 26 September 1964) was a Scottish footballer who played as a left back, initially for hometown team Kilmarnock where he played for seven seasons between 1919 and late 1925 (Joe Nibloe establishing himself in the position thereafter). He had a short spell at Preston North End before moving to the American Soccer League where he featured for Springfield Babes, Fall River and Providence over five years, (Note: Statistics for 1926–27 have been confused with fellow Scottish defender William Gibson and added to the record of a third player, Daniel Gibson).) returning to Scotland in 1932 with Queen of the South and Galston (both then playing in the Scottish Football Alliance league).

He won the Scottish Cup with Kilmarnock in 1920 and the National Challenge Cup with Fall River in 1927.
