= William Watson (footballer, born 1900) =

Scottish footballer

Personal information
- Full name: William Watson
- Date of birth: 4 June 1900
- Place of birth: Catrine, Scotland
- Position: Inside forward

Youth career
- Nithsdale Wanderers

Senior career*
Years	Team	Apps	(Gls)
1920–1922	Kilmarnock		
1922–1923	Dumbarton	6	(0)
1923–1926	Galston		
1926–1927	Beith		
- * Club domestic league appearances and goals

William Watson (born 4 June 1900) was a Scottish footballer who played for Kilmarnock, Dumbarton, Galston and Beith.
