= Simpson Bainbridge =

English footballer (1895–1988)

Personal information
- Full name: Simpson Bainbridge
- Date of birth: 3 April 1895
- Place of birth: Silksworth, England
- Date of death: 12 November 1988 (aged 93)
- Place of death: Sunderland, England
- Height: 5 ft 7 in (1.70 m)
- Position: Outside forward

Senior career*
Years	Team	Apps	(Gls)
- Seaton Delaval
1912–1919	Leeds City	64	(15)
1919–1920	Preston North End	14	(1)
1920–1921	South Shields	13	(3)
1921–1922	Aberdeen	22	(1)
- Wheatley Hill Alliance
- Shildon
- Hylton Colliery

International career
1908	England Schoolboys	1	(2)
- * Club domestic league appearances and goals

Simpson Bainbridge (3 April 1895 – 12 November 1988) was an English professional footballer who played as an outside forward in the Football League for Leeds City, Preston North End and South Shields.

== Personal life ==
Bainbridge served as a private in the Lincolnshire Regiment, the Durham Light Infantry and the Labour Corps during the First World War. He had attested in the army on 9 December 1915 and was discharged due to a knee injury on 21 January 1919.

== Career statistics ==
Appearances and goals by club, season and competition
Club	Season	League			National Cup		Total	
Club	Season	Division	Apps	Goals	Apps	Goals	Apps	Goals
Leeds City	1912–13	Second Division	24	4	1	0	25	4
Leeds City	1913–14	Second Division	15	4	2	0	17	4
Leeds City	1914–15	Second Division	18	4	2	0	20	4
Leeds City	1919–20	Second Division	7	3	—		7	3
Leeds City	Total		64	15	5	0	69	15
Aberdeen	1921–22	Scottish First Division	22	1	7	1	29	2
Career total			86	16	12	1	98	17
