= Archibald McLardie =

Scottish footballer

Personal information
- Positions: Forward; right half

Youth career
- Renfrew Juniors

Senior career*
Years	Team	Apps	(Gls)
1921–1922	St Mirren	3	(0)
1923–1924	Vale of Leven	29	(8)
1924–1926	Dumbarton	68	(16)
1926–1927	Johnstone		
1927	Vale of Leven		
1927–1929	Dumbarton	71	(4)
- * Club domestic league appearances and goals

Archibald McLardie was a Scottish footballer who played in the Scottish League for St Mirren, Vale of Leven and Dumbarton as a forward and right half during the 1910s and 1920s.
