= List of Elgin City F.C. seasons =

This is a list of Elgin City Football Club seasons from 1895 to 1896, when Elgin City were admitted to the Highland League, to the present day. The list details Elgin's record in major league and cup competitions, and the club's top league goal scorer of each season where available. Top scorers in bold were also the top scorers in Elgin's division that season. Records of competitions such as the North of Scotland Cup are not included.

The club was founded in 1893 and originally played in the Highland Football League. In 2000 the club was elected to the Scottish Football League along with Peterhead F.C.

== Key ==
Key to divisions

- Highland League – Highland Football League
- Third Division – Scottish Football League Third Division
- League Two – Scottish League Two

Key to positions and symbols

- 1st – Champions
- 2nd – Runners-up
- 3rd – 3rd place
- ↑ – Promoted
- ↓ – Relegated

Key to rounds

- GS – Group stage
- R1 – Round 1, etc.
- QF – Quarter-finals
- SF – Semi-finals
- RU – Runners-up
- **W** – Winners

== Seasons ==
This list is incomplete; you can help by adding missing items with reliable sources.

Season	League record									Scottish Cup	Highland League Cup Scottish League Cup	Challenge Cup	Other	Top league goalscorer	
Season	Division	P	W	D	L	F	A	Pts	Pos	Scottish Cup	Highland League Cup Scottish League Cup	Challenge Cup	Other	Name	Goals
1895–96	Highland League	10	3	2	5	26	24	8	4th	–	N/A	N/A	North of Scotland Cup Runners-up		
1896–97	–									–	N/A	N/A		–	
1897–98	Highland League	13	8	2	3	44	30	18	3rd	–	N/A	N/A			
1898–99	Highland League	12	7	2	3	44	19	16	3rd	–	N/A	N/A	North of Scotland Cup Winners		
1899–1900	Highland League	10	0	0	10	9	38	0	6th	–	N/A	N/A			
1900–01	Banffshire & District League	10	7	0	3	32	11	14	1st	–	N/A	N/A			
1901–02	Banffshire & District League									–	N/A	N/A			
1902–03	Highland League	10	1	1	8	9	25	3	6th	–	N/A	N/A			
1903–04	Highland League	12	2	2	8	19	44	6	6th	–	N/A	N/A			
1904–05	Highland League	12	0	3	9	8	38	3	7th	–	N/A	N/A			
1905–06	Highland League	12	0	0	12	7	50	0	7th	–	N/A	N/A			
1906–07	Highland League	9	4	1	4	16	21	9	4th	–	N/A	N/A			
1907–08	Highland League	10	1	3	6	15	26	5	6th	R1	N/A	N/A			
1908–09	Highland League	11	3	1	7	16	24	7	6th	R1	N/A	N/A			
1909–10	Highland League	14	9	2	3	41	20	20	2nd (Note: Finished equal on points with Inverness Thistle and lost in the play-offs.)	–	N/A	N/A			
1910–11	Highland League	14	1	1	12	15	38	3	8th	–	N/A	N/A			
1911–12	Highland League	12	5	1	6	25	32	11	5th	–	N/A	N/A			
1912–13	Highland League	16	5	5	6	27	32	15	6th	–	N/A	N/A			
1913–14	Highland League	16	8	2	6	30	23	18	3rd	–	N/A	N/A	North of Scotland Cup Runners-up		
1914–15	Highland League	4	1	1	2	4	12	3	– (Note: League abandoned due to The Great War.)	N/A	N/A	N/A	N/A	–	
1915–16	–									N/A	N/A	N/A	N/A	–	
1916–17	–									N/A	N/A	N/A	N/A	–	
1917–18	–									N/A	N/A	N/A	N/A	–	
1918–19	–									N/A	N/A	N/A	N/A	–	
1919–20	Highland League	18	10	3	5	55	31	23	4th	–	N/A	N/A			
1920–21	Highland League	12	4	3	5	10	21	11	6th	R2	N/A	N/A			
1921–22	Highland League	14	4	2	8	22	25	10	6th	–	N/A	N/A			
1922–23	Highland League	16	10	3	3	33	16	23	2nd	R1	N/A	N/A			
1923–24	Highland League	16	8	4	4	28	20	20	3rd	–	N/A	N/A	North of Scotland Cup Winners		
1924–25	Highland League	20	10	4	6	48	30	24	3rd	–	N/A	N/A			
1925–26	Highland League	18	12	1	5	48	39	25	3rd	–	N/A	N/A			
1926–27	Highland League	18	8	2	8	49	42	18	5th	R2	N/A	N/A			
1927–28	Highland League	18	5	4	9	25	35	14	7th	R1	N/A	N/A			
1928–29	Highland League	22	13	3	6	49	36	29	2nd	–	N/A	N/A			
1929–30	Highland League	22	15	3	4	72	37	33	2nd	–	N/A	N/A	North of Scotland Cup Runners-up		
1930–31	Highland League	21	10	3	8	50	59	23	7th	R1	N/A	N/A			
1931–32	Highland League	26	16	6	4	71	25	38	1st	–	N/A	N/A			
1932–33	Highland League	26	15	4	7	76	59	34	2nd	–	N/A	N/A			
1933–34	Highland League	26	11	6	9	53	58	28	5th	–	N/A	N/A	Nairn & District Cup Winners		
1934–35	Highland League	24	16	4	4	72	33	36	1st	–	N/A	N/A			
1935–36	Highland League	22	11	2	9	63	55	24	5th	R2	N/A	N/A	Scottish Qualifying Cup (North) Winners		
1936–37	Highland League	22	11	5	6	78	47	27	3rd	R1	N/A	N/A	North of Scotland Cup Winners		
1937–38	Highland League	22	16	1	5	93	36	33	3rd	R1	N/A	N/A	Scottish Qualifying Cup (North) Winners Inverness Cup Winners		
1938–39	Highland League	26	14	3	9	75	57	31	3rd	R2	N/A	N/A			
1939–40	Highland League	2	0	1	1	4	5	1	– (Note: League abandoned due to The Second Great War.)	N/A	N/A	N/A		–	
1939–40	Central Highland League First Series	10	7	0	3	38	19	14	2nd	N/A	N/A	N/A			
1939–40	Central Highland League Second Series	4	2	1	1	9	9	5	2nd	N/A	N/A	N/A			
1940–41	–									N/A	N/A	N/A	N/A	–	
1941–42	–									N/A	N/A	N/A	N/A	–	
1942–43	–									N/A	N/A	N/A	N/A	–	
1943–44	–									N/A	N/A	N/A	N/A	–	
1944–45	–									N/A	N/A	N/A	N/A	–	
1945–46	–									N/A	N/A	N/A		–	
1946–47	Highland League	30	9	5	16	59	79	23	11th	–	RU	N/A			
1947–48	Highland League	30	16	6	8	117	78	38	5th	–	R2	N/A	North of Scotland Cup Runners-up		
1948–49	Highland League	30	20	3	7	101	55	43	3rd	R1	RU	N/A	Scottish Qualifying Cup (North) Runners-up North of Scotland Cup Runners-up Campbell Charity Cup Winners		
1949–50	Highland League	30	16	6	8	72	55	38	5th	–	R2	N/A			
1950–51	Highland League	28	14	3	11	72	58	31	6th	R1	SF	N/A			
1951–52	Highland League	28	12	3	13	79	66	27	8th	R2	SF	N/A			
1952–53	Highland League	28	23	1	4	84	37	47	1st	R1	GS	N/A			
1953–54	Highland League	28	17	4	7	77	49	38	2nd	–	GS	N/A			
1954–55	Highland League	27	15	3	9	72	54	33	4th	R2	GS	N/A	North of Scotland Cup Winners		
1955–56	Highland League	28	22	1	5	92	44	45	1st (Note: Finished equal on points with Buckie Thistle and won in the play-offs.)	R2	GS	N/A	North of Scotland Cup Winners		
1956–57	Highland League	28	16	5	7	75	48	37	3rd	R2		N/A			
1957–58	Highland League	28	19	2	7	77	45	40	2nd	–		N/A			
1958–59	Highland League	28	15	6	7	85	49	36	3rd	–	SF	N/A			
1959–60	Highland League	28	19	4	5	90	54	42	1st	R3	W	N/A	Scottish Qualifying Cup (North) Winners North of Scotland Cup Runners-up		
1960–61	Highland League	28	19	6	3	85	39	44	1st (Note: Finished equal on points with Keith and won in the play-offs.)	R1		N/A	North of Scotland Cup Winners		
1961–62	Highland League	28	18	4	6	91	46	40	2nd	R1	SF	N/A	North of Scotland Cup Winners		
1962–63	Highland League	28	22	1	5	105	47	45	1st	–	GS	N/A			
1963–64	Highland League	30	17	3	10	90	59	37	5th	–	GS	N/A			
1964–65	Highland League	30	21	4	5	109	52	46	1st	PR2	GS	N/A	Scottish Qualifying Cup (North) Winners		
1965–66	Highland League	30	24	5	1	96	35	53	1st	PR2	RU	N/A			
1966–67	Highland League	30	19	9	2	111	37	47	2nd	R2	W	N/A	Scottish Qualifying Cup (North) Runners-up		
1967–68	Highland League	30	26	3	1	117	28	55	1st	QF		N/A	Scottish Qualifying Cup (North) Winners North of Scotland Cup Winners		
1968–69	Highland League	30	24	4	2	100	32	52	1st	PR2	R2	N/A	North of Scotland Cup Winners		
1969–70	Highland League	30	24	1	5	101	28	49	1st	–	SF	N/A	North of Scotland Cup Runners-up		
1970–71	Highland League	30	19	6	5	90	37	44	4th	R3	R2	N/A	Scottish Qualifying Cup (North) Winners North of Scotland Cup Winners Inverness Cup Winners Drybrough Cup Winners		
1971–72	Highland League	30	25	1	4	99	32	51	2nd	R4	R1	N/A	Scottish Qualifying Cup (North) Runners-up North of Scotland Cup Runners-up Bells Cup (West) Winners		
1972–73	Highland League	30	18	5	7	75	39	41	4th	R3	SF	N/A	North of Scotland Cup Winners Bells Cup (West) Winners		
1973–74	Highland League	30	19	7	4	71	30	45	1st	–	SF	N/A	Bells Cup (West) Winners		
1974–75	Highland League	30	15	6	9	64	46	36	5th	–	R2	N/A	North of Scotland Cup Runners-up		
1975–76	Highland League	30	11	11	8	57	48	33	7th	R1	SF	N/A	Scottish Qualifying Cup (North) Runners-up North of Scotland Cup Winners		
1976–77	Highland League	30	9	7	14	33	53	25	11th	R4	R1	N/A	Scottish Qualifying Cup (North) Runners-up		
1977–78	Highland League	30	15	8	7	56	44	38	5th	–	R1	N/A			
1978–79	Highland League	30	14	7	9	64	49	35	6th	–	R2	N/A			
1979–80	Highland League	30	11	11	8	39	42	33	9th	–	R2	N/A	North of Scotland Cup Runners-up		
1980–81	Highland League	30	17	6	7	63	32	40	3rd	–	SF	N/A			
1981–82	Highland League	30	15	7	8	55	37	37	4th	R2	R2	N/A	Scottish Qualifying Cup (North) Runners-up		
1982–83	Highland League	30	19	4	7	65	30	61	2nd	R3	W	N/A	North of Scotland Cup Winners		
1983–84	Highland League	30	17	5	8	59	31	56	4th	R1	R2	N/A	Scottish Qualifying Cup (North) Runners-up		
1984–85	Highland League	30	13	8	9	55	37	47	7th	–	R2	N/A			
1985–86	Highland League	32	21	7	4	67	33	70	2nd	–	RU	N/A	Scottish Qualifying Cup (North) Runners-up North of Scotland Cup Runners-up		
1986–87	Highland League	34	21	7	6	93	33	70	3rd	–	PR	N/A			
1987–88	Highland League	34	17	8	9	69	41	59	7th	–	SF	N/A			
1988–89	Highland League	34	19	9	6	70	29	66	5th	R2	R1	N/A	North of Scotland Cup Winners		
1989–90	Highland League	34	26	3	5	103	33	81	1st	R2	R1	N/A	Scottish Qualifying Cup (North) Winners North of Scotland Cup Winners		
1990–91	Highland League	34	17	6	11	84	53	57	7th	–	W	–			
1991–92	Highland League	34	16	6	12	76	51	54	8th	–	R1	–			
1992–93	Highland League	34	24	5	5	110	35	77	– (Note: Stripped of the title due to the use of two ineligible players.)	–	R2	–			
1993–94	Highland League	34	19	6	9	60	33	63	6th	–	SF	–			
1994–95	Highland League	30	15	3	12	52	42	48	8th	–	GS	–			
1995–96	Highland League	30	15	3	12	59	55	48	7th	–	SF	–			
1996–97	Highland League	30	13	4	13	64	66	43	9th	R1	GS	–	Scottish Qualifying Cup Runners-up		
1997–98	Highland League	30	16	7	7	59	33	55	5th	–	W	–	North of Scotland Cup Winners		
1998–99	Highland League	30	21	1	8	71	39	64	4th	–	GS	–	North of Scotland Cup Winners		
1999–2000	Highland League	30	12	6	12	45	44	42	9th	–	RU	–			
2000–01	Third Division	36	5	7	24	29	65	22	10th	R2	R1	R1		Colin Milne; David Ross	6
2001–02	Third Division	36	13	8	15	45	47	47	6th	R1	R1	R1		Ian Gilzean	12
2002–03	Third Division	36	5	13	18	33	63	28	9th	R2	R1	R1		Kevin Steele	6
2003–04	Third Division	36	6	7	23	48	93	25	9th	R1	R1	R1	North of Scotland Cup Winners	Alex Bone	15
2004–05	Third Division	36	12	7	17	39	61	43	6th	R2	R1	R1		Willie Martin	9
2005–06	Third Division	36	15	7	14	55	58	52	5th	R1	R1	R1		**Martin Johnston**	**19**
2006–07	Third Division	36	9	2	25	39	69	29	9th	R3	R2	R2		**Martin Johnston**	**18**
2007–08	Third Division	36	13	8	15	56	68	47	6th	R2	R1	R1	North of Scotland Cup Runners-up	Darren Shallicker	12
2008–09	Third Division	36	7	5	24	31	79	26	10th	R3	R1	R1		Darren Shallicker	7
2009–10	Third Division	36	9	7	20	46	59	34	9th	R3	R1	QF		**Craig Gunn**	**18**
2010–11	Third Division	36	13	6	17	53	63	45	7th	R4	R2	R1		Jason Crooks	13
2011–12	Third Division	36	16	9	11	68	60	57	4th	R3	R1	R2		Craig Gunn	18
2012–13	Third Division	36	13	10	13	67	69	49	5th	R4	R1	R1		Stuart Leslie	14
2013–14	League Two	36	9	9	18	62	73	36	9th	R3	R1	R2		Craig Gunn	15
2014–15	League Two	36	12	9	15	55	58	45	7th	R3	R1	R1	North of Scotland Cup Runners-up	Craig Gunn	13
2015–16	League Two	36	17	8	11	59	46	59	2nd	R3	R1	QF		Craig Gunn	21
2016–17	League Two	36	14	9	13	67	47	51	5th	R4	GS	R3		Shane Sutherland	18
2017–18	League Two	36	14	7	15	54	61	49	6th	R3	GS	R3		Brian Cameron	10
2018–19	League Two	36	13	4	19	52	67	43	8th	R4	GS	R1		Brian Cameron	8
2019–20	League Two	28	12	7	9	48	34	43	3rd	R3	GS	QF		Shane Sutherland	16
2020–21	League Two	22	12	2	8	39	28	38	3rd	R2	GS	N/A		Kane Hester	15
2021–22	League Two	36	9	10	17	33	51	37	9th	R2	GS	R3		Kane Hester	13
2022–23	League Two	36	11	7	18	44	62	40	9th	R5	GS	R4		Kane Hester	18
2023–24	League Two	36	10	10	16	35	59	40	7th	R2	GS	R3		Russell Dingwall	6
2024–25	League Two	36	16	7	13	48	41	55	4th	R4	GS	R3		Russell Dingwall	9

== League performance summary ==
- **115** total seasons (including 2021–22)
- **22** seasons in Scottish Professional Football League / Scottish Football League
- **91** seasons in Highland Football League
- **2** seasons in Banffshire & District Football League
