= Sandy Grosert =

Scottish footballer

Personal information
- Full name: Alexander Ramsay Grosert
- Date of birth: 1 January 1889
- Place of birth: Leith, Scotland
- Date of death: 12 September 1952 (aged 63)
- Place of death: Aberdeen, Scotland
- Position: Right half

Senior career*
Years	Team	Apps	(Gls)
- Newtongrange Star
1911–1912	Leith Athletic	11	(0)
1912–1920	Hibernian	106	(4)
1915	→ Leith Athletic (loan)	3	(0)
1920–1923	Aberdeen	67	(0)
1923	Dunfermline Athletic	7	(0)
- * Club domestic league appearances and goals

Alexander Ramsay Grosert MC (1 January 1889 – 12 September 1952) was a Scottish footballer, who played as a right half in the Scottish League for Hibernian, Aberdeen, Leith Athletic and Dunfermline Athletic.

== Personal life ==
Grosert served in McCrae's Battalion, the Machine Gun Corps and the Gordon Highlanders of the British Army during the First World War. Grosert was serving as a second lieutenant in the Gordon Highlanders in 1918 when he performed an action which was recognised with the Military Cross:

For conspicuous gallantry in charge of a platoon during the operations near Rœux on August 27th, 1918. When the troops on his left flank retired and the enemy made a determined bombing attack on his position, he continued to go over the open under fire from one post to another directing and encouraging the men. He held on till only four of the men were left, and he was almost surrounded. He behaved splendidly.

Grosert was severely gassed and wounded during the war. After his retirement from football, he became an amateur golfer and was also a qualified dentist.

== Career statistics ==
Appearances and goals by club, season and competition
Club	Season	League			National Cup		Total	
Club	Season	Division	Apps	Goals	Apps	Goals	Apps	Goals
Leith Athletic	1911–12	Scottish Second Division	11	0	3	0	14	0
Hibernian	1911–12	Scottish First Division	2	0	0	0	2	0
Hibernian	1912–13	Scottish First Division	29	3	5	0	34	3
Hibernian	1913–14	Scottish First Division	25	0	7	0	32	0
Hibernian	1914–15	Scottish First Division	25	0	—		25	0
Hibernian	1915–16	Scottish First Division	1	0	—		1	0
Hibernian	1917–18	Scottish First Division	2	0	—		2	0
Hibernian	1918–19	Scottish First Division	7	1	—		7	1
Hibernian	1919–20	Scottish First Division	15	0	0	0	15	0
Hibernian	Total		106	4	12	0	118	4
Leith Athletic (loan)	1914–15	Scottish Second Division	3	0	—		3	0
Leith Athletic (loan)	Total		14	0	3	0	17	0
Aberdeen	1920–21	Scottish First Division	29	0	4	1	33	1
Aberdeen	1921–22	Scottish First Division	17	0	3	0	20	0
Aberdeen	1922–23	Scottish First Division	21	0	1	0	22	0
Aberdeen	Total		67	0	8	1	75	1
Dunfermline Athletic	1923–24	Scottish Second Division	7	0	0	0	7	0
Career total			194	4	23	1	217	5
