= 1922–23 Scottish Division Two =

Scottish Division Two
- Season: 1922–23
- Champions: Queen's Park
- Promoted: Queen's Park; Clydebank

The 1922–23 Scottish Division Two was won by Queen's Park who, along with second placed Clydebank, were promoted to the First Division. Arbroath finished bottom.

== Table ==
Pos	Team	Pld	W	D	L	GF	GA	GD	Pts	Promotion or relegation
1	Queen's Park	38	24	9	5	73	31	+42	57	Promotion to the 1923–24 Division One
2	Clydebank	38	21	10	7	69	29	+40	52	Promotion to the 1923–24 Division One
3	St Johnstone	38	19	12	7	60	39	+21	48 (Note: 2 points deducted)	
4	Dumbarton	38	17	8	13	61	40	+21	42	
5	Bathgate	38	16	9	13	67	55	+12	41	
6	Armadale	38	15	11	12	63	52	+11	41	
7	Bo'ness	38	12	17	9	48	46	+2	41	
8	Broxburn United	38	14	12	12	42	45	−3	40	
9	East Fife	38	16	7	15	48	42	+6	39	
10	Lochgelly United	38	16	5	17	41	64	−23	37	
11	Cowdenbeath	38	16	6	16	56	52	+4	36	
12	King's Park	38	14	6	18	46	59	−13	34	
13	Dunfermline Athletic	38	11	11	16	46	44	+2	33	
14	Stenhousemuir	38	13	7	18	53	67	−14	33	
15	Forfar Athletic	38	13	7	18	53	73	−20	33	
16	Johnstone	38	13	6	19	41	62	−21	32	
17	Vale of Leven	38	11	8	19	50	59	−9	30	
18	St Bernard's	38	8	15	15	39	50	−11	29	
19	East Stirlingshire	38	10	8	20	48	69	−21	28	Relegated to the 1923–24 Division Three
20	Arbroath	38	8	12	18	45	71	−26	28	
