= James Warden (footballer) =

Scottish footballer

Personal information
- Position: Defender

Senior career*
Years	Team	Apps	(Gls)
- Renfrew
1923–1927	Dumbarton	96	(3)
1927–1934	Third Lanark	110	(11)
1934	Raith Rovers	1	(0)
1934–1937	Dunfermline Athletic	83	(7)
1937	Alloa Athletic	4	(0)
Total		294	(21)

International career
1933	Scottish League XI	1	(0)
- * Club domestic league appearances and goals

James Warden was a Scottish footballer who played as a defender for Dumbarton, Third Lanark, Dunfermline Athletic and Alloa Athletic during the 1920s and 1930s.

While at Third Lanark, he was selected once for the Scottish Football League XI in September 1933. The SFL lost 3–0 to the Irish League XI in Belfast, and of the 11 picked by the Scots (seven of whom were making their debuts), only one was selected again.
