= 1923–24 Scottish Division Two =

Scottish Division Two
- Season: 1923–24
- Champions: St Johnstone
- Promoted: St Johnstone; Cowdenbeath

The 1923–24 Scottish Division Two was won by St Johnstone who, along with second placed Cowdenbeath, were promoted to Division One. Vale of Leven and Lochgelly United finished 19th and 20th respectively and were relegated to Division Three.

== Table ==
Pos	Team	Pld	W	D	L	GF	GA	GD	Pts	Promotion or relegation
1	St Johnstone	38	22	12	4	79	31	+48	56	Promotion to the 1924–25 Division One
2	Cowdenbeath	38	23	9	6	78	33	+45	55	Promotion to the 1924–25 Division One
3	Bathgate	38	16	12	10	58	49	+9	44	
4	Stenhousemuir	38	16	11	11	58	45	+13	43	
5	Albion Rovers	38	15	12	11	67	53	+14	42	
6	King's Park	38	16	10	12	67	57	+10	42	
7	Dunfermline Athletic	38	14	11	13	52	46	+6	39	
8	Johnstone	38	16	7	15	60	56	+4	39	
9	Dundee United	38	12	15	11	41	41	0	39	
10	Dumbarton	38	17	5	16	55	56	−1	39	
11	Armadale	38	16	6	16	56	63	−7	38	
12	East Fife	38	14	9	15	54	47	+7	37	
13	Bo'ness	38	13	11	14	45	53	−8	37	
14	Forfar Athletic	38	14	7	17	42	67	−25	35	
15	Broxburn United	38	13	8	17	50	56	−6	34	
16	Alloa Athletic	38	14	6	18	44	53	−9	34	
17	Arbroath	38	12	8	18	49	51	−2	32	
18	St Bernard's	38	11	10	17	49	54	−5	32	
19	Vale of Leven	38	11	9	18	41	67	−26	31	Relegated to the 1924–25 Division Three
20	Lochgelly United	38	4	4	30	21	86	−65	12	Relegated to the 1924–25 Division Three
