= William Gibson (1920s footballer) =

Scottish footballer

Personal information
- Date of birth: c. 1900
- Place of birth: Port Glasgow, Scotland
- Date of death: c. 1976 (aged 75–76)
- Height: 6 ft 0 in (1.83 m)
- Position: Full back

Senior career*
Years	Team	Apps	(Gls)
- Port Glasgow Victoria
1920–1923	Morton	55	(10)
1923–1926	Dumbarton	108	(0)
1926–1927	New Bedford Whalers	31	(0)
1927–1929	Boston Soccer Club	70	(0)
1928	→ Dumbarton (loan)	1	(0)
1929–1930	Bethlehem Steel	16	(0)
1930–1932	Glentoran		

International career
1930	Irish League XI	1	(0)
- * Club domestic league appearances and goals

William Gibson was a Scottish footballer who played as a full back for Morton and Dumbarton in his native country during the 1920s, also spending time in the United States where he featured for three American Soccer League clubs, (Note: Statistics for 1926–27 have been confused with fellow Scottish defender David Gibson (which were added to the record of a third player, Daniel Gibson).) and in Northern Ireland, winning the 1930–31 Irish League with Glentoran and also representing the Irish League XI in October 1930.
