= Francis Carlow =

Scottish footballer

Personal information
- Full name: Francis Carlow
- Date of birth: 14 May 1903
- Place of birth: Renton
- Position: Centre forward

Senior career*
Years	Team	Apps	(Gls)
1922–1923	Partick Thistle		
1923–1926	Dumbarton	43	(24)
- * Club domestic league appearances and goals

Francis William Carlow (born 14 May 1903) was a Scottish footballer who played for Partick Thistle and Dumbarton.
