= Fred McLachlan =

Scottish footballer

Fred Maclachlan
Personal information
- Full name: Frederick Maclachlan
- Date of birth: 21 August 1899
- Place of birth: Kirkcudbright, Scotland
- Date of death: 1982 (aged 82–83)
- Height: 5 ft 10 in (1.78 m)
- Position: Wing half

Senior career*
| Years | Team | Apps | (Gls) |
| 1912–1913 | St Cuthbert Wanderers | | |
| 1913–1914 | King's Own Scottish Borderers | | |
| 1914–1918 | Austin Motor Works | | |
| 1918–1919 | Harold Johnson Motor Works | | |
| 1919–1921 | Partick Thistle | 16 | (0) |
| 1920 | → Dalbeattie Star (loan) | | |
| 1921–1922 | Aberdeen | 6 | (0) |
| 1922–1923 | Maidstone United | | |
| 1923–1925 | Coventry City | 67 | (0) |
| 1925–1927 | Grimsby Town | 52 | (0) |
| 1927–1928 | Bury | 2 | (0) |
| 1928–1932 | Halifax Town | 94 | (1) |
- * Club domestic league appearances and goals

Frederick Maclachlan (21 August 1899 – 1982) was a Scottish professional footballer who played as a wing half.
