= Philip Kennedy (footballer) =

Scottish footballer

Personal information
- Full name: Philip Kennedy
- Position: Inside forward

Senior career*
Years	Team	Apps	(Gls)
1922–1926	Dumbarton	115	(27)
1925–1926	Bo'ness (loan)		
1926–1927	Bathgate		
- * Club domestic league appearances and goals

Philip Kennedy was a Scottish football player, who played for Dumbarton and Bathgate during the 1920s. He also had a season on loan with Bo'ness.
