= 1924–25 Scottish Division Two =

Scottish Division Two
- Season: 1924–25
- Champions: Dundee United
- Promoted: Dundee United; Clydebank

The 1924–25 Scottish Division Two was won by Dundee United who, along with second placed Clydebank, were promoted to Division One. Johnstone and Forfar Athletic finished 19th and 20th respectively and were relegated to Division Three.

== Table ==
Pos	Team	Pld	W	D	L	GF	GA	GD	Pts	Promotion or relegation
1	Dundee United	38	20	10	8	58	44	+14	50	Promotion to the 1925–26 Division One
2	Clydebank	38	20	8	10	65	42	+23	48	Promotion to the 1925–26 Division One
3	Clyde	38	20	7	11	72	39	+33	47	
4	Alloa Athletic	38	17	11	10	57	41	+16	45	
5	Arbroath	38	16	10	12	47	46	+1	42	
6	Bo'ness	38	16	9	13	71	48	+23	41	
7	Broxburn United	38	16	9	13	48	54	−6	41	
8	Dumbarton	38	15	10	13	45	44	+1	40	
9	East Fife	38	17	5	16	66	58	+8	39	
10	King's Park	38	15	8	15	54	46	+8	38	
11	Stenhousemuir	38	15	7	16	51	58	−7	37	
12	Arthurlie	38	14	8	16	56	60	−4	36	
13	Dunfermline Athletic	38	14	7	17	62	57	+5	35	
14	Albion Rovers	38	15	5	18	58	64	−6	35	
15	Armadale	38	15	5	18	55	62	−7	35	
16	Bathgate	38	12	10	16	58	74	−16	34	
17	St Bernard's	38	14	4	20	52	71	−19	32	
18	East Stirlingshire	38	11	8	19	58	72	−14	30	
19	Johnstone	38	12	4	22	53	85	−32	28	Relegated to the 1925–26 Division Three
20	Forfar Athletic	38	10	7	21	46	67	−21	27	Relegated to the 1925–26 Division Three
