= Andrew Miller (footballer) =

Scottish footballer

Personal information
- Full name: Andrew Miller
- Date of birth: 27 February 1899
- Place of birth: Bo'ness, Scotland
- Position: Outside left

Youth career
- Croy Celtic

Senior career*
Years	Team	Apps	(Gls)
1920–1923	Celtic	6	(1)
1922	→ Stenhousemuir (loan)	3	(0)
1922–1923	→ Dumbarton (loan)	37	(8)
1923–1924	Dumbarton	38	(5)
1924–1925	Nottingham Forest		
1925–1926	Bo'ness	21	(3)
- Camelon Juniors
- * Club domestic league appearances and goals

Andrew Miller (born 27 February 1899) was a Scottish footballer who played for Celtic, Dumbarton, Nottingham Forest and Bo'ness.
