= Billy Middleton =

English footballer

Personal information
- Full name: William Middleton
- Date of birth: 1893
- Place of birth: Hetton-le-Hole, England
- Height: 5 ft 7 in (1.70 m)
- Position: Forward

Senior career*
Years	Team	Apps	(Gls)
1910–1911	Boldon Colliery Welfare		
1911–1912	Newcastle City		
1912–	Brighton & Hove Albion	10	(1)
	Birmingham	0	(0)
	Crystal Palace	34	(8)
- Folkestone
1913–1920	Ayr United	167	(31)
1920–1923	Aberdeen	110	(7)
1923–1924	Southend United	30	(0)
1924	Dumbarton	6	(0)
- * Club domestic league appearances and goals

William Middleton was an English professional footballer who made over 280 appearances as a forward in the Scottish League for Ayr United, Aberdeen and Dumbarton. He also played in the Football League for Southend United.

== Personal life ==
Middleton served as a private in the Football Battalion of the Middlesex Regiment during the First World War.

== Career statistics ==
Appearances and goals by club, season and competition
Club	Season	League			National cup (Note: Includes Scottish Cup, FA Cup)		Total	
Club	Season	Division	Apps	Goals	Apps	Goals	Apps	Goals
Ayr United	1913–14	Scottish First Division	31	5	1	0	32	2
Ayr United	1914–15	Scottish First Division	32	5	—		32	5
Ayr United	1915–16	Scottish First Division	16	0	—		16	0
Ayr United	1916–17	Scottish First Division	15	4	—		15	4
Ayr United	1917–18	Scottish First Division	23	9	—		23	9
Ayr United	1918–19	Scottish First Division	27	5	—		27	5
Ayr United	1919–20	Scottish First Division	23	3	—		23	3
Ayr United	Total		167	31	1	0	168	31
Aberdeen	1920–21	Scottish First Division	39	3	4	1	43	4
Aberdeen	1921–22	Scottish First Division	40	1	7	0	47	1
Aberdeen	1922–23	Scottish First Division	31	3	5	1	36	4
Aberdeen	Total		110	7	16	2	126	9
Southend United	1923–24	Third Division South	30	0	1	0	31	0
Dumbarton	1924–25	Scottish Second Division	6	0	0	0	6	0
Career total			313	38	18	2	331	40
