= 1927–28 Scottish Division One =

29th season of top-tier football league in Scotland

Scottish Division One
- Season: 1927–28
- Champions: Rangers
- Relegated: Bo'ness; Dunfermline Athletic
- Matches: 380
- Goals: 1,420 (3.74 per match)

The 1927–28 Scottish Division One season was won by Rangers by five points over nearest rival Celtic. Bo'ness and Dunfermline Athletic finished 19th and 20th respectively and were relegated to the 1928–29 Scottish Division Two.

== League table ==
Pos	Team	Pld	W	D	L	GF	GA	GD	Pts
1	Rangers	38	26	8	4	109	36	+73	60
2	Celtic	38	23	9	6	93	39	+54	55
3	Motherwell	38	23	9	6	92	46	+46	55
4	Heart of Midlothian	38	20	7	11	89	50	+39	47
5	St Mirren	38	18	8	12	77	76	+1	44
6	Partick Thistle	38	18	7	13	85	67	+18	43
7	Aberdeen	38	19	5	14	71	61	+10	43
8	Kilmarnock	38	15	10	13	68	78	−10	40
9	Cowdenbeath	38	16	7	15	66	68	−2	39
10	Falkirk	38	16	5	17	76	69	+7	37
11	St Johnstone	38	14	8	16	66	67	−1	36
12	Hibernian	38	13	9	16	73	75	−2	35
13	Airdrieonians	38	12	11	15	59	69	−10	35
14	Dundee	38	14	7	17	65	80	−15	35
15	Clyde	38	10	11	17	46	72	−26	31
16	Queen's Park	38	12	6	20	69	80	−11	30
17	Raith Rovers	38	11	7	20	60	89	−29	29
18	Hamilton Academical	38	11	6	21	67	86	−19	28
19	Bo'ness	38	9	8	21	48	86	−38	26
20	Dunfermline Athletic	38	4	4	30	41	126	−85	12

Source: "1927-1928 Division 1 - SPFL Archive". SPFL.

== Results ==
Home \ Away	ABE	AIR	BON	CEL	CLY	COW	DND	DNF	FAL	HAM	HOM	HIB	KIL	MOT	PAR	QPA	RAI	RAN	STJ	STM
Aberdeen		0–0	0–1	3–1	6–0	3–0	3–1	2–1	2–1	2–0	2–0	4–2	1–2	2–0	3–0	2–1	3–0	2–3	4–0	3–2
Airdrieonians	2–1		4–2	3–1	1–2	1–2	1–1	3–1	0–1	2–0	2–0	2–2	0–2	0–2	2–0	0–0	2–4	2–7	2–0	2–3
Bo'ness	0–0	2–2		0–1	0–0	0–3	2–0	4–2	2–1	2–2	2–2	2–1	2–1	1–1	1–4	2–0	1–1	1–1	1–2	2–3
Celtic	1–1	3–2	4–1		3–0	1–1	3–1	9–0	3–0	4–0	2–1	3–0	6–1	1–2	0–0	3–0	0–3	1–0	3–0	6–0
Clyde	3–2	2–2	3–0	0–1		2–3	0–0	4–0	1–1	3–1	2–2	0–2	1–1	1–2	0–2	2–1	1–1	1–4	1–0	1–0
Cowdenbeath	2–2	2–1	2–3	0–2	1–1		1–0	1–1	0–2	3–1	0–1	3–1	1–1	3–4	2–1	1–0	3–1	1–4	4–2	2–4
Dundee	3–2	3–0	3–2	1–4	4–3	3–1		3–2	1–0	3–1	2–7	4–1	7–0	0–3	4–2	1–3	1–2	0–1	1–2	2–1
Dunfermline Athletic	2–3	1–4	1–2	1–1	2–3	3–2	3–1		1–0	1–2	0–2	0–2	0–4	0–5	1–7	3–1	0–4	0–5	2–3	1–2
Falkirk	5–1	3–1	3–2	1–3	4–2	1–3	5–1	5–1		1–2	1–3	2–2	6–0	2–1	2–1	1–2	4–1	1–2	5–1	3–0
Hamilton Academical	2–3	0–2	7–0	0–0	1–1	5–1	3–3	6–3	3–0		1–6	4–1	3–1	1–3	0–2	2–1	4–1	1–1	2–1	1–2
Heart of Midlothian	3–0	1–1	5–0	2–2	5–0	2–3	1–0	6–0	9–3	2–1		2–2	0–1	0–0	1–2	4–2	2–0	0–0	0–2	2–1
Hibernian	0–0	2–3	3–0	2–2	0–1	3–0	4–0	3–3	3–1	5–1	2–1		3–1	2–2	4–1	6–2	3–2	2–1	2–2	1–1
Kilmarnock	2–1	2–2	3–1	2–2	3–0	2–1	1–2	2–1	1–1	3–1	5–0	2–1		1–3	2–3	1–1	1–0	1–1	1–7	6–2
Motherwell	2–1	1–1	3–2	3–1	5–0	2–1	2–2	4–0	2–3	5–1	0–3	2–1	3–3		1–3	4–1	6–0	1–1	1–0	4–0
Partick Thistle	7–0	0–2	2–1	3–3	2–1	2–4	2–2	2–1	1–1	5–2	1–3	3–0	2–0	1–1		2–0	5–0	0–6	2–2	6–2
Queen's Park	4–3	1–1	1–0	1–3	2–2	1–1	1–2	4–0	0–1	4–1	0–2	6–2	5–3	3–1	4–2		8–1	3–1	1–1	3–4
Raith Rovers	2–3	5–0	3–2	0–3	2–0	0–1	1–1	5–1	2–2	3–3	0–5	3–0	1–3	2–4	4–2	1–0		0–0	0–0	1–2
Rangers	5–0	2–1	3–1	1–0	3–1	2–2	5–1	4–0	4–0	3–1	4–1	4–1	5–1	0–2	2–1	4–0	7–0		5–1	4–2
St Johnstone	1–0	6–1	4–1	3–5	0–0	0–3	5–1	1–1	2–1	2–1	2–3	2–0	1–1	1–4	1–2	5–1	2–1	0–1		0–0
St Mirren	0–1	2–2	5–0	0–2	3–1	3–2	0–0	5–1	3–2	1–0	2–0	3–2	1–1	1–1	2–2	5–1	4–3	3–3	3–2	

Legend: Blue = home team win; Yellow = draw; Red = away team win.
