= 1911–12 Aberdeen F.C. season =

Aberdeen F.C.
1911–12 season
- Chairman: Thomas Duncan
- Manager: Jimmy Philip
- Scottish Football League Division One: 9th
- Scottish Cup: Third round
- Top goalscorer: League: Dave Main (12); All: Dave Main (14)
- Highest home attendance: 22,000 vs. Celtic, 24 February 1912
- Lowest home attendance: 3,000 vs. Morton, 6 April 1912

Aberdeen F.C. competed in Scottish Football League Division One and Scottish Cup in season 1911–12.

== Overview ==
Aberdeen finished in ninth place in Scottish Division One and were knocked out of the Scottish Cup at the third round stage after a replay defeat to Celtic. Dave Main finished as the club's top scorer with 14 goals. In September 1911, Pittodrie Stadium was closed for two weeks after Rangers players were pelted with stones.

== Results ==
=== Scottish Division One ===
Match Day	Date	Opponent	H/A	Score	Aberdeen Scorer(s)	Attendance
1	19 August	Raith Rovers	H	3–1	McIntosh, Main, Wood	10,000
2	26 August	Third Lanark	H	1–2	Lennie	10,000
3	2 September	Hamilton Academical	A	1–1	Soye	6,000
4	16 September	Rangers	H	1–2	Main	14,000
5	23 September	Falkirk	A	0–3		10,000
6	25 September	Queen's Park	H	3–0	Main, Wood, Lennie	8,000
7	30 September	Kilmarnock	H	1–2	Main	4,000
8	7 October	Clyde	A	1–0	Wood	5,000
9	14 October	Celtic	A	0–1		10,500
10	21 October	Partick Thistle	H	3–1	Soye, Walker, Main	6,000
11	28 October	St Mirren	A	3–1	Soye, Main (2)	6,000
12	4 November	Airdrieonians	H	3–0	Main, Wood (2)	6,000
13	11 November	Queen's Park	A	5–2	Soye, Walker, Main (2), Lennie	4,000
14	18 November	Raith Rovers	A	1–1	Lennie	8,000
15	25 November	Heart of Midlothian	A	2–1	Wyllie, Main	12,000
16	2 December	Motherwell	H	0–1		8,000
17	9 December	Partick Thistle	A	1–3	McIntosh	10,000
18	16 December	Dundee	H	2–1	McIntosh, Lennie	10,000
19	23 December	Hibernian	A	1–1	Lennie	6,000
20	30 December	St Mirren	H	2–1	Wyllie, Main	9,000
21	1 January	Morton	A	1–2	Walker	6,000
22	6 January	Hamilton Academical	H	2–0	McIntosh, John Wood	4,000
23	13 January	Dundee	A	0–4		10,500
24	20 January	Rangers	A	0–2		18,000
25	2 March	Hibernian	H	1–1	Wyllie	5,000
26	16 March	Heart of Midlothian	H	1–0	Wood	4,500
27	23 March	Celtic	H	1–1	Wood	6,000
28	30 March	Clyde	H	0–0		4,000
29	6 April	Morton	H	1–1	Soye	3,000
30	8 April	Third Lanark	A	2–0	Hume, McIntosh	2,500
31	13 April	Motherwell	A	0–2		3,000
32	17 April	Falkirk	H	1–0	Soye	3,500
33	20 April	Airdrieonians	A	0–3		1,500
34	27 April	Kilmarnock	A	0–3		4,000

==== Final standings ====
Pos	Team	Pld	W	D	L	GF	GA	GD	Pts
7	Falkirk	34	15	6	13	46	33	+13	36
8	Dundee	34	13	9	12	52	41	+11	35
9	Aberdeen	34	14	7	13	44	44	0	35
10	Airdrieonians	34	12	8	14	40	41	−1	32
11	Third Lanark	34	12	7	15	40	57	−17	31

Source: "1911-1912 Division 1 - SPFL Archive". SPFL.

=== Scottish Cup ===
Round	Date	Opponent	H/A	Score	Aberdeen Scorer(s)	Attendance
R1	27 January	St Mirren	A	3–3	Wyllie, Soye, Wood	16,000
R1 R	10 February	St Mirren	H	4–0	Walker, Main, Wood, Lennie	14,000
R2	17 February	Armadale	H	3–0	Wyllie, Wood, Lennie	7,000
R3	24 February	Celtic	H	2–2	Soye, Main	22,000
R3 R	9 March	Celtic	A	0–2		40,000

== Squad ==
=== Appearances & Goals ===
No.	Pos	Nat	Player	Total		Division One		Scottish Cup	
No.	Pos	Nat	Player	Apps	Goals	Apps	Goals	Apps	Goals
	DF	(Scotland) SCO	Donald Colman (c)	35	0	32	0	3	0
	MF	(Scotland) SCO	Stewart Davidson	28	0	23	0	5	0
	FW	(Scotland) SCO	Willie Dickson	1	0	1	0	0	0
	FW	(Scotland) SCO	Sam Douglas	2	0	2	0	0	0
	FW	(Scotland) SCO	John Edgar	2	0	2	0	0	0
	GK	(Scotland) SCO	Andy Greig	27	0	22	0	5	0
	DF	(Scotland) SCO	Bobby Hannah	4	0	2	0	2	0
	DF	(Scotland) SCO	Archie Harper	2	0	2	0	0	0
	DF	(Scotland) SCO	Jock Hume	37	1	32	1	5	0
	GK	(Scotland) SCO	Arthur King	12	0	12	0	0	0
	FW	(Scotland) SCO	Willie Lennie	33	8	28	6	5	2
	MF	(Scotland) SCO	Willie Low	3	0	3	0	0	0
	FW	(Scotland) SCO	Dave Main	34	14	29	12	5	2
	FW	(Scotland) SCO	Vic McEchern	1	0	1	0	0	0
	FW	(Scotland) SCO	Angus McIntosh	20	5	19	5	1	0
	MF	(Scotland) SCO	James Miller	13	0	13	0	0	0
	FW	(Scotland) SCO	John Neilson	3	0	3	0	0	0
	FW	(Scotland) SCO	Jimmy Soye	37	8	32	6	5	2
	FW	(Scotland) SCO	Joseph Walker	24	4	20	3	4	1
	MF	(Scotland) SCO	George Wilson	35	0	30	0	5	0
	FW	(England) ENG	John Wood	37	10	32	7	5	3
	MF	(Scotland) SCO	Jock Wyllie	39	6	34	4	5	2
