= 1913–14 Aberdeen F.C. season =

Aberdeen F.C.
1913–14 season
- Chairman: Thomas Duncan
- Manager: Jimmy Philip
- Scottish Football League Division One: 14th
- Scottish Cup: Second round
- Top goalscorer: League: Dave Main (9); All: Dave Main (11)
- Highest home attendance: 21,000 vs. St Mirren, 21 February 1914
- Lowest home attendance: 3,500 vs. Third Lanark, 18 March 1914

Aberdeen F.C. competed in Scottish Football League Division One and Scottish Cup in season 1913–14.

== Overview ==
This was Aberdeen's ninth season in the top flight of Scottish football and their tenth overall in League football. The club finished in 14th place out of 20 clubs in Division One. In the Scottish Cup, they lost in the second round to St Mirren in a 1–2 defeat at home. A financial crisis at the club (partly due to falling attendances due to the First World War) meant that the club's best players were put up for sale.

== Results ==
=== Scottish Division One ===
Match Day	Date	Opponent	H/A	Score	Aberdeen Scorer(s)	Attendance
1	16 August	Clyde	H	1–2	Main	10,000
2	23 August	Hibernian	A	0–1		12,000
3	30 August	Airdrieonians	H	0–0		9,000
4	6 September	Rangers	A	1–5	Main	20,000
5	13 September	Falkirk	H	0–0		4,000
6	20 September	Motherwell	A	2–3	J Wyllie, McIntosh	8,000
7	22 September	Rangers	H	0–0		18,000
8	27 September	St Mirren	H	2–1	Travers (2)	9,000
9	4 October	Celtic	A	1–2	Wood	17,000
10	11 October	Celtic	H	0–1		11,000
11	18 October	Raith Rovers	A	1–4	Main	6,000
12	25 October	Ayr United	H	2–2	J. Wyllie, McLeod	6,000
13	1 November	Hamilton Academical	A	0–3		4,000
14	8 November	Morton	A	1–3	McLeod	8,000
15	15 November	Partick Thistle	H	0–0		5,000
16	22 November	Queen's Park	H	2–1	J. Wyllie, McLeod	7,000
17	29 November	Heart of Midlothian	A	0–4		16,000
18	6 December	Kilmarnock	H	1–2	Walker	7,000
19	13 December	Clyde	A	0–1		5,000
20	20 December	Dumbarton	H	2–3	Soye, Main	5,000
21	27 December	Queen's Park	A	2–2	Walker, McLeod	4,000
22	1 January	Dundee	A	1–0	J. Wyllie	8,500
23	3 January	Raith Rovers	H	1–0	J. Wyllie	10,000
24	10 January	Heart of Midlothian	H	0–1		5,000
25	17 January	St Mirren	A	2–0	Main (2)	5,500
26	24 January	Hamilton Academical	H	5–0	Walker, Main (2), Travers, Scorgie	7,000
27	31 January	Dumbarton	A	1–0	Soye	3,000
28	28 February	Partick Thistle	A	1–0	J. Wyllie	9,000
29	7 March	Morton	H	2–1	J. Wyllie, Walker	8,000
30	14 March	Falkirk	A	0–2		4,500
31	18 March	Third Lanark	H	0–0		3,500
32	21 March	Hibernian	H	1–2	McLeod	4,000
33	28 March	Dundee	H	2–2	J. Wyllie, W. Wylie	14,000
34	4 April	Airdrieonians	A	1–4	Travers	3,500
35	11 April	Motherwell	H	0–0		5,000
36	18 April	Ayr United	A	1–2	W. Wylie	7,000
37	22 April	Kilmarnock	A	2–1	Walker, Main	6,500
38	25 April	Third Lanark	A	0–0		4,500

==== Final standings ====
Pos	Team	Pld	W	D	L	GF	GA	GD	Pts
12	Kilmarnock	38	11	9	18	48	68	−20	31
13	Hibernian	38	12	6	20	58	75	−17	30
14	Aberdeen	38	10	10	18	38	55	−17	30
15	Partick Thistle	38	10	9	19	37	51	−14	29
16	Queen's Park	38	10	9	19	52	84	−32	29

Source: "1913-1914 Division 1 - SPFL Archive". SPFL.

=== Scottish Cup ===
Round	Date	Opponent	H/A	Score	Aberdeen Scorer(s)	Attendance
R1	7 February	Albion Rovers	H	4–1	Soye, Main (2), Scorgie	15,000
R2	21 February	St Mirren	H	1–2	Travers	21,000

== Squad ==
=== Appearances & Goals ===
No.	Pos	Nat	Player	Total		Division One		Scottish Cup	
No.	Pos	Nat	Player	Apps	Goals	Apps	Goals	Apps	Goals
	GK	(Scotland) SCO	Ron Barclay	2	0	2	0	0	0
	MF	(Scotland) SCO	Dod Brewster	11	0	11	0	0	0
	MF	(Scotland) SCO	Charlie Chatwin	1	0	1	0	0	0
	DF	(Scotland) SCO	Donald Colman (c)	37	0	35	0	2	0
	FW	(Scotland) SCO	Willie Green	6	0	6	0	0	0
	GK	(Scotland) SCO	Andy Greig	34	0	32	0	2	0
	DF	(Scotland) SCO	Bobby Hannah	27	0	25	0	2	0
	DF	(Scotland) SCO	Jock Hume	16	0	16	0	0	0
	MF	(Scotland) SCO	Willie Low	37	0	35	0	2	0
	FW	(Scotland) SCO	Dave Main	32	11	30	9	2	2
	GK	(Scotland) SCO	John Markey	4	0	4	0	0	0
	FW	(England) ENG	Angus McIntosh	9	1	9	1	0	0
	FW	(Scotland) SCO	Angus McLeod	12	5	12	5	0	0
	FW	(Scotland) SCO	Jim Muir	1	0	1	0	0	0
	FW	(Scotland) SCO	Herbert Murray	2	0	2	0	0	0
	FW	(Scotland) SCO	Arthur Robertson	4	0	4	0	0	0
	FW	(Scotland) SCO	John Scorgie	16	2	15	1	1	1
	FW	(Scotland) SCO	Jimmy Soye	37	3	35	2	2	1
	FW	(Scotland) SCO	Pat Travers	33	5	31	4	2	1
	FW	(Scotland) SCO	Joseph Walker	28	5	26	5	2	0
	MF	(Scotland) SCO	Fred Watson	1	0	1	0	0	0
	MF	(Scotland) SCO	George Wilson	24	0	24	0	0	0
	MF	(England) ENG	John Wood	7	1	7	1	0	0
	MF	(Scotland) SCO	Alex Wright	13	0	11	0	2	0
	MF	(Scotland) SCO	Jock Wyllie	34	8	32	8	2	0
	FW	(England) ENG	Willie Wylie	12	2	11	2	1	0
