= 1912–13 Aberdeen F.C. season =

Aberdeen F.C.
1912–13 season
- Chairman: Thomas Duncan
- Manager: Jimmy Philip
- Scottish Football League Division One: 7th
- Scottish Cup: Second round
- Top goalscorer: League: Dave Main (10); All: Dave Main (11)
- Highest home attendance: 20,000 vs. Rangers, 5 October 1912
- Lowest home attendance: 300 vs. Queen's Park, 30 September 1912

Aberdeen F.C. competed in Scottish Football League First Division and Scottish Cup in season 1912–1913.

== Overview ==
Aberdeen finished in seventh place in Division One in their ninth season in the Scottish league. They were knocked out of the Scottish Cup at the second round stage by Second Division club Dumbarton. Dave Main finished as league top scorer with ten goals. A club record low attendance of 300 was set in a League game against Queen's Park in September 1912.

== Results ==
=== Scottish Division One ===
Match Day	Date	Opponent	H/A	Score	Aberdeen Scorer(s)	Attendance
1	17 August	Raith Rovers	H	2–0	Wilson, Soye	10,000
2	24 August	Dundee	A	3–0	Milne (2), Lennie	20,000
3	31 August	Third Lanark	H	0–0		12,000
4	7 September	Celtic	A	0–2		12,000
5	21 September	Hamilton Academical	H	2–0	Soye, Travers	9,000
6	23 September	Clyde	H	0–1		11,000
7	28 September	Morton	A	1–0	Murray	12,000
8	30 September	Queen's Park	H	4–0	Main, Wood (2), Murray	300
9	5 October	Rangers	H	1–3	Main	20,000
10	12 October	Airdrieonians	A	1–1	Travers	7,000
11	19 October	Heart of Midlothian	H	0–1		9,000
12	26 October	Falkirk	H	2–2	Travers, Main	8,000
13	2 November	Clyde	A	1–0	Lennie	8,000
14	9 November	Kilmarnock	H	0–0		7,000
15	16 November	Partick Thistle	H	3–1	Hannah, Hume, Milne	8,000
16	23 November	Hibernian	A	1–3	Milne	7,000
17	30 November	Motherwell	A	1–1	Milne	5,000
18	7 December	Morton	H	0–0		7,000
19	14 December	Falkirk	A	1–3	Milne	5,000
20	21 December	Hibernian	H	1–3	Milne	4,000
21	28 December	Rangers	A	1–3	Milne	15,000
22	1 January	Dundee	H	1–0	Wood	10,000
23	4 January	Raith Rovers	A	0–0		8,000
24	11 January	St Mirren	A	2–2	Travers, Main	4,000
25	18 January	Airdrieonians	H	4–1	Wilson, Milne, Main, Scorgie	6,000
26	25 January	Queen's Park	A	1–0	Wilson	7,000
27	1 February	Heart of Midlothian	A	1–4	Walker	10,000
28	15 February	Celtic	H	3–1	Wilson, Travers, Scorgie	10,000
29	22 February	Third Lanark	A (Note: This game was played at Aberdeen's Pittodrie Stadium despite Third Lanark being the home team.)	2–0	Main, Wood	9,500
30	1 March	St Mirren	H	4–0	Wilson, Main (2), Wood	7,000
31	8 March	Kilmarnock	A	1–3	Travers	3,500
32	15 March	Hamilton Academical	A	0–3		3,000
33	29 March	Motherwell	H	2–2	Travers, Main	6,500
34	19 April	Partick Thistle	A	1–0	Main	6,000

==== Final standings ====
Pos	Team	Pld	W	D	L	GF	GA	GD	Pts
=6	Hibernian	34	16	5	13	63	54	+9	37
=6	Motherwell	34	12	13	9	47	39	+8	37
=6	Aberdeen	34	14	9	11	47	40	+7	37
9	Clyde	34	13	9	12	41	44	−3	35
10	Hamilton Academical	34	12	8	14	44	47	−3	32

Source: "1912-1913 Division 1 - SPFL Archive". SPFL.

=== Inter City Midweek League ===
Match Day	Date	Opponent	H/A	Score	Hibernian Scorer(s)	Attendance
1	15 October	Rangers	A	2–5	Milne	1,300
2	23 October	Hibernian	H	0–2		
3	30 October	Heart of Midlothian	A	0–1	Main, Walker	2,000
4	6 November	Dundee	H	3–2	Wood, Walker, Wilson	

=== Scottish Cup ===
Round	Date	Opponent	H/A	Score	Aberdeen Scorer(s)	Attendance
R2 (Note: Aberdeen were given a bye into the Second round)	8 February	Dumbarton	A	1–2	Main	8,000

== Squad ==
=== Appearances and goals ===
No.	Pos	Nat	Player	Total		Division One		Scottish Cup	
No.	Pos	Nat	Player	Apps	Goals	Apps	Goals	Apps	Goals
	MF	(Scotland) SCO	Dod Brewster	7	0	7	0	0	0
	DF	(Scotland) SCO	Donald Colman (c)	34	0	33	0	1	0
	MF	(Scotland) SCO	Stewart Davidson	32	0	31	0	1	0
	GK	(Scotland) SCO	Andy Greig	10	0	10	0	0	0
	DF	(Scotland) SCO	Bobby Hannah	21	1	20	1	1	0
	DF	(Scotland) SCO	Jock Hume	22	0	21	0	1	0
	GK	(Scotland) SCO	Arthur King	25	0	24	0	1	0
	FW	(Scotland) SCO	Willie Lennie	23	2	22	2	1	0
	MF	(Scotland) SCO	Willie Low	4	0	4	0	0	0
	FW	(Scotland) SCO	Dave Main	25	11	24	10	1	1
	MF	(Scotland) SCO	John McConnell	20	0	19	0	1	0
	FW	(Scotland) SCO	William Milne	19	9	18	9	1	0
	FW	(Scotland) SCO	Herbert Murray	5	2	5	2	0	0
	FW	(Scotland) SCO	John Scorgie	9	0	7	0	2	0
	FW	(Scotland) SCO	Jimmy Soye	32	2	32	2	0	0
	FW	(Scotland) SCO	Pat Travers	33	7	32	7	1	0
	MF	(Scotland) SCO	Joseph Walker	17	1	17	1	0	0
	MF	(Scotland) SCO	Fred Watson	1	0	1	0	0	0
	MF	(Scotland) SCO	George Wilson	32	5	31	5	1	0
	FW	(England) ENG	John Wood	17	5	16	5	1	0
