= 1910–11 Aberdeen F.C. season =

Aberdeen F.C.
1910–11 season
- Chairman: Thomas Duncan
- Manager: Jimmy Philip
- Scottish Football League Division One: runner-up
- Scottish Cup: Semi-final
- Top goalscorer: League: Angus McIntosh (16); All: Angus McIntosh (17)
- Highest home attendance: 15,000 vs. Clyde, 2 January 1911
- Lowest home attendance: 3,500 vs. Hamilton Academical, 25 March 1911

Aberdeen F.C. competed in Scottish Football League Division One and Scottish Cup in season 1910–11.

== Overview ==
This was Aberdeen's eighth season overall and their sixth successive season in the top flight of Scottish football. The team finished in their highest league position to date, second behind champions Rangers. In the Scottish Cup, they lost in the semi-final to Celtic. New additions to the team included forward Pat Travers, who later went on to manage the club. Angus McIntosh finished as the club's top scorer with 17 goals in both competitions.

== Results ==
=== Scottish Division One ===
Match Day	Date	Opponent	H/A	Score	Aberdeen Scorer(s)	Attendance
1	20 August	Raith Rovers	H	2–0	McIntosh, Lennie	7,000
2	22 August	Third Lanark	A	2–2	Soye, McIntosh	6,000
3	3 September	Hamilton Academical	H	2–2	Murray, Lennie	5,000
4	17 September	Rangers	A	4–2	Wyllie, McIntosh, Murray, Lennie	19,000
5	24 September	Falkirk	H	1–0	Murray	9,000
6	26 September	Queen's Park	H	5–1	McIntosh (3), Murray, Travers	9,000
7	1 October	Clyde	A	0–0		12,000
8	8 October	Motherwell	H	3–0	Soye, Murray, Lennie	10,000
9	15 October	Kilmarnock	A	1–0	Travers	7,000
10	22 October	Airdrieonians	H	1–0	Soye	7,500
11	29 October	Partick Thistle	A	0–1		20,000
12	5 November	Heart of Midlothian	H	3–2	McIntosh, Murray, Travers	8,000
13	12 November	Dundee	A	0–2		18,000
14	19 November	St Mirren	H	2–1	McIntosh, Murray	4,000
15	26 November	Raith Rovers	A	1–0	Travers	5,000
16	3 December	Rangers	H	1–0	McIntosh	11,000
17	10 December	Hibernian	A	1–2	McIntosh	7,000
18	17 December	Heart of Midlothian	A	3–0	Murray, McIntosh, Travers	7,500
19	24 December	Dundee	H	0–0		13,000
20	31 December	St Mirren	A	0–2		7,000
21	2 January	Clyde	H	1–0	Murray	15,000
22	7 January	Falkirk	A	1–1	McIntosh	7,000
23	14 January	Celtic	H	1–0	Soye	13,500
24	21 January	Motherwell	A	1–0	Travers	6,500
25	4 February	Third Lanark	H	3–1	Miller, Soye, Lennie	9,500
26	18 February	Kilmarnock	H	1–1	Travers	10,000
27	4 March	Morton	H	3–1	McIntosh, Nicol, Lennie	8,000
28	18 March	Airdrieonians	A	3–1	McIntosh, Nicol, Travers	4,500
29	25 March	Hamilton Academical	A	0–1		3,500
30	1 April	Partick Thistle	H	1–1	Lennie	9,000
31	8 April	Hibernian	H	1–1	McIntosh	7,000
32	15 April	Morton	A	1–1	McIntosh	7,000
33	22 April	Queen's Park	A	4–2	Wyllie, Travers (2), Lennie	4,000
34	29 April	Celtic	A	0–0		12,500

==== Final standings ====
Pos	Team	Pld	W	D	L	GF	GA	GD	Pts
1	Rangers (C)	34	23	6	5	90	34	+56	52
2	Aberdeen	34	19	10	5	53	28	+25	48
3	Falkirk	34	17	10	7	65	42	+23	44
4	Partick Thistle	34	17	8	9	50	41	+9	42
5	Celtic	34	15	11	8	48	18	+30	41

Rules for classification: Teams finish equal if level on points. Points system: 2 points for a win, 1 point for a draw, 0 points for a loss
(C) Champions

=== Scottish Cup ===
Round	Date	Opponent	H/A	Score	Aberdeen Scorer(s)	Attendance
R1	28 January	Brechin City	H	3–0	Soye, Murray, Travers	6,500
R2	11 February	Airdrieonians	H	1–0	McIntosh	13,000
R3	25 February	Forfar Athletic	H	6–0	Nicol (5), Travers	10,000
SF	11 March	Celtic	A	0–1		45,000

== Squad ==
=== Appearances & Goals ===
No.	Pos	Nat	Player	Total		Division One		Scottish Cup	
No.	Pos	Nat	Player	Apps	Goals	Apps	Goals	Apps	Goals
	DF	(Scotland) SCO	Donald Colman (c)	36	0	32	0	4	0
	DF	(Scotland) SCO	Stewart Davidson	11	0	7	0	4	0
	FW	(Scotland) SCO	John Edgar	1	0	1	0	0	0
	DF	(Scotland) SCO	Bobby Hannah	2	0	2	0	0	0
	DF	(Scotland) SCO	Archie Harper	2	0	2	0	0	0
	DF	(Scotland) SCO	Jock Hume	36	0	32	0	4	0
	GK	(Scotland) SCO	Arthur King	38	0	34	0	4	0
	FW	(Scotland) SCO	Willie Lennie	31	8	27	8	4	0
	MF	(Scotland) SCO	George MacFarlane	2	0	2	0	0	0
	FW	(Scotland) SCO	Angus McIntosh	38	17	34	16	4	1
	MF	(Scotland) SCO	James Miller	34	1	30	1	4	0
	FW	(Scotland) SCO	Tom Murray	30	10	29	9	1	1
	FW	(Scotland) SCO	Charlie Neilson	5	0	5	0	0	0
	FW	(Scotland) SCO	WD Nicol	9	7	7	2	2	5
	MF	(Scotland) SCO	James Robertson	1	0	1	0	0	0
	FW	(Scotland) SCO	Jimmy Soye	37	6	33	5	4	1
	FW	(Scotland) SCO	Pat Travers	38	12	34	10	4	2
	DF	(Scotland) SCO	George Wilson	34	0	32	0	2	0
	MF	(Scotland) SCO	Jock Wyllie	33	2	30	2	3	0
