= 1915–16 Aberdeen F.C. season =

Aberdeen F.C.
1915–16 season
- Chairman: Thomas Duncan
- Manager: Jimmy Philip
- Scottish Football League: 11th
- Top goalscorer: League: Dave Main (15); All: Dave Main (15)
- Highest home attendance: 12,000 vs. Celtic, 5 February 1916
- Lowest home attendance: 1,500 vs. Ayr United, 25 September 1915

Aberdeen F.C. competed in the Scottish Football League in season 1915–16.

== Overview ==
Despite the First World War in Europe continuing, football continued in Scotland, although the Scottish Cup was suspended for the second season in a row. Aberdeen finished 11th out of 20 clubs in the table. Highlights included an eleven-game undefeated run from November to January. Dave Main finished as the club's top scorer with 15 goals in 32 appearances.

== Results ==
=== Scottish Football League ===
| Match Day | Date | Opponent | H/A | Score | Aberdeen Scorer(s) | Attendance |
|---|---|---|---|---|---|---|
| 1 | 21 August | Kilmarnock | A | 0–5 | | 1,500 |
| 2 | 28 August | Dumbarton | H | 2–2 | Walker, Main | 4,500 |
| 3 | 4 September | St Mirren | A | 2–3 | Wright, Robertson | 4,000 |
| 4 | 11 September | Third Lanark | H | 1–1 | J. Wyllie | 6,000 |
| 5 | 18 September | Airdrieonians | A | 1–1 | MacLachlan | 4,000 |
| 6 | 25 September | Ayr United | H | 1–1 | Robertson | 1,500 |
| 7 | 27 September | Queen's Park | H | 5–1 | Walker (2), Jamieson (2), Main | 4,000 |
| 8 | 2 October | Partick Thistle | A | 0–3 | | 5,000 |
| 9 | 9 October | Clyde | H | 1–1 | Main | 5,000 |
| 10 | 16 October | Morton | A | 0–3 | | 5,500 |
| 11 | 23 October | Hibernian | H | 1–1 | Walker | 4,500 |
| 12 | 30 October | Hamilton Academical | H | 1–3 | J. Wyllie | 7,000 |
| 13 | 6 November | Celtic | A | 1–3 | Main | 4,500 |
| 14 | 13 November | Raith Rovers | H | 2–1 | Archibald, Own goal | 4,000 |
| 15 | 20 November | Dundee | H | 2–0 | Walker, Main | 7,000 |
| 16 | 27 November | Motherwell | A | 2–2 | Archibald, Main | 3,000 |
| 17 | 4 December | Heart of Midlothian | A | 2–1 | Archibald, Cail | 6,500 |
| 18 | 11 December | Airdrieonians | H | 2–1 | Main (2) | 5,500 |
| 19 | 18 December | Falkirk | A | 3–0 | Archibald, Cail, W. Wylie | 4,000 |
| 20 | 25 December | St Mirren | H | 2–1 | Archibald, W. Wylie | 2,000 |
| 21 | 1 January | Dundee | A | 1–1 | Cumming | 7,000 |
| 22 | 8 January | Kilmarnock | H | 2–0 | Brewster, Archibald | 6,500 |
| 23 | 15 January | Queen's Park | A | 1–0 | Brewster | 5,000 |
| 24 | 22 January | Partick Thistle | H | 1–1 | Main | 5,500 |
| 25 | 29 January | Third Lanark | A | 2–6 | Brewster, Cumming | 5,000 |
| 26 | 5 February | Celtic | H | 0–4 | | 12,000 |
| 27 | 12 February | Ayr United | A | 1–2 | Main | 2,000 |
| 28 | 19 February | Rangers | A | 0–4 | | 15,000 |
| 29 | 26 February | Falkirk | H | 2–0 | J. Wyllie, Main | 4,000 |
| 30 | 4 March | Clyde | A | 2–3 | Grant, Main | 4,000 |
| 31 | 11 March | Heart of Midlothian | H | 1–1 | Cail | 4,500 |
| 32 | 18 March | Hamilton Academical | A | 0–2 | | 2,500 |
| 33 | 1 April | Motherwell | H | 5–0 | Archibald, Main (2), Cail, W. Wylie | 5,000 |
| 34 | 8 April | Morton F.C. | H | 0–1 | | 4,500 |
| 35 | 15 April | Hibernian | A | 0–0 | | 3,000 |
| 36 | 22 April | Raith Rovers | A | 1–2 | Main | 2,000 |
| 37 | 25 April | Dumbarton | A | 1–2 | Cumming | 2,500 |
| 38 | 29 April | Rangers | H | 0–0 | | 6,000 |

==== Final standings ====
| Pos | Team | Pld | W | D | L | GF | GA | GD | Pts |
|---|---|---|---|---|---|---|---|---|---|
| 9 | Dumbarton | 38 | 13 | 11 | 14 | 54 | 64 | −10 | 37 |
| 10 | Kilmarnock | 38 | 12 | 11 | 15 | 46 | 49 | −3 | 35 |
| 11 | Aberdeen | 38 | 11 | 12 | 15 | 51 | 64 | −13 | 34 |
| 12 | Falkirk | 38 | 12 | 9 | 17 | 45 | 61 | −16 | 33 |
| 13 | St Mirren | 38 | 13 | 4 | 21 | 50 | 67 | −17 | 30 |

Source: "1915-1916 SFL - SPFL Archive". SPFL.

=== Scottish Cup ===
The Scottish Cup was suspended for a second successive season due to the First World War.

== Squad ==
=== Appearances & Goals ===
| No. | Pos | Nat | Player | Total | | División One | |
| No. | Pos | Nat | Player | Apps | Goals | Apps | Goals |
|---|---|---|---|---|---|---|---|
| | GK | (England) ENG | George Anderson | 33 | 0 | 33 | 0 |
| | FW | (Scotland) SCO | Bobby Archibald | 38 | 7 | 38 | 7 |
| | MF | (Scotland) SCO | George Brewster | 33 | 3 | 33 | 3 |
| | FW | (Scotland) SCO | Sam Cail | 22 | 4 | 22 | 4 |
| | DF | (Scotland) SCO | Charlie Calder | 2 | 0 | 2 | 0 |
| | MF | (Scotland) SCO | Charlie Chatwin | 23 | 0 | 23 | 0 |
| | DF | (Scotland) SCO | Donald Colman (c) | 27 | 0 | 27 | 0 |
| | FW | (Scotland) SCO | JF Cumming | 15 | 3 | 15 | 3 |
| | MF | (Scotland) SCO | Bert Ferguson | 1 | 0 | 1 | 0 |
| | MF | (Scotland) SCO | Tom Gallacher | 9 | 0 | 9 | 0 |
| | FW | (Scotland) SCO | Walter Grant | 14 | 1 | 14 | 1 |
| | GK | (Scotland) SCO | Andy Greig | 5 | 0 | 5 | 0 |
| | DF | (Scotland) SCO | Jock Hume | 31 | 0 | 31 | 0 |
| | FW | (Scotland) SCO | Stewart Jamieson | 6 | 2 | 6 | 2 |
| | MF | (Scotland) SCO | Bert MacLachlan | 24 | 1 | 24 | 1 |
| | FW | (Scotland) SCO | Dave Main | 32 | 15 | 32 | 15 |
| | FW | (Scotland) SCO | George McKay | 2 | 0 | 2 | 0 |
| | FW | (Scotland) SCO | Angus McLeod | 4 | 0 | 4 | 0 |
| | MF | (Scotland) SCO | John McNair | 2 | 0 | 2 | 0 |
| | DF | (Scotland) SCO | Allan McRobbie | 2 | 0 | 2 | 0 |
| | DF | (Scotland) SCO | Jock Munro | 1 | 0 | 1 | 0 |
| | FW | (Scotland) SCO | John Paton | 3 | 0 | 3 | 0 |
| | DF | (Scotland) SCO | Alex Perry | 6 | 0 | 6 | 0 |
| | FW | (Scotland) SCO | Arthur Robertson | 5 | 2 | 5 | 2 |
| | FW | (Scotland) SCO | Peter Sloan | 2 | 0 | 2 | 0 |
| | FW | (Scotland) SCO | Joseph Walker | 19 | 5 | 19 | 5 |
| | MF | (Scotland) SCO | Alex Wright | 6 | 1 | 6 | 1 |
| | FW | (England) ENG | Willie Wylie | 31 | 3 | 31 | 3 |
| | MF | (Scotland) SCO | Jock Wyllie | 20 | 3 | 20 | 3 |
