= 1914–15 Aberdeen F.C. season =

Aberdeen F.C.
1914–15 season
- Chairman: Thomas Duncan
- Manager: Jimmy Philip
- Scottish Football League Division One: 14th
- Top goalscorer: League: Sam Cail (9); All: Sam Cail (9)
- Highest home attendance: 15,000 vs. Rangers, 22 August 1914
- Lowest home attendance: 2,000 vs. Morton, 6 February 1915

Aberdeen F.C. competed in the Scottish Football League Division One in 1914–15.

== Overview ==
Aberdeen finished in 14th place out of 20 in Scottish Division One. There was no Scottish Cup in this season due to the First World War, though league football continued. Sam Cail finished as the club's top scorer with nine goals.

== Results ==
=== Scottish Division One ===
| Match Day | Date | Opponent | H/A | Score | Aberdeen Scorer(s) | Attendance |
|---|---|---|---|---|---|---|
| 1 | 15 August | Dundee | A | 3–1 | Soye, Walker, Cail | 10,000 |
| 2 | 22 August | Rangers | H | 0–2 | | 15,000 |
| 3 | 29 August | Morton | A | 1–1 | Cail | 4,500 |
| 4 | 5 September | Clyde | H | 2–0 | MacLachlan, Archibald | 6,000 |
| 5 | 12 September | Ayr United | A | 0–1 | | 2,000 |
| 6 | 19 September | Motherwell | H | 3–1 | J. Wyllie, MacLachlan, Walker | 7,000 |
| 7 | 26 September | Heart of Midlothian | A | 0–2 | | 14,000 |
| 8 | 28 September | Queen's Park | H | 1–1 | Main | 5,000 |
| 9 | 3 October | St Mirren | H | 0–0 | | 6,000 |
| 10 | 10 October | Airdrieonians | A | 0–3 | | 7,000 |
| 11 | 17 October | Third Lanark | H | 1–2 | Archibald | 6,000 |
| 12 | 24 October | Falkirk | A | 1–1 | J. Wyllie | 5,500 |
| 13 | 31 October | Hibernian | A | 2–1 | Chatwin, Main | 4,000 |
| 14 | 7 November | Raith Rovers | H | 1–3 | Main | 6,000 |
| 15 | 14 November | Hamilton Academical | A | 0–3 | | 4,000 |
| 16 | 21 November | Dumbarton | H | 0–0 | | 5,000 |
| 17 | 28 November | Kilmarnock | A | 2–5 | MacLachlan, McLeod | 2,500 |
| 18 | 5 December | Celtic | H | 0–1 | | 7,000 |
| 19 | 12 December | Partick Thistle | A | 0–3 | | 6,000 |
| 20 | 19 December | Kilmarnock | H | 3–0 | MacLachlan, Cail, Main | 4,000 |
| 21 | 26 December | Motherwell | A | 1–1 | Walker | 3,000 |
| 22 | 1 January | Dundee | H | 2–1 | Walker, J. Wyllie | 7,000 |
| 23 | 2 January | Raith Rovers | A | 1–5 | Cail | 6,000 |
| 24 | 9 January | Ayr United | H | 1–1 | Cail | 4,500 |
| 25 | 16 January | Clyde | A | 0–3 | | 3,000 |
| 26 | 23 January | Falkirk | H | 1–2 | Walker | 4,000 |
| 27 | 30 January | Dumbarton | A | 2–3 | Cail, Walker | 3,000 |
| 28 | 6 February | Morton | H | 2–0 | Brewster, Archibald | 2,000 |
| 29 | 13 February | St Mirren | A | 2–0 | Cail, Walker | 3,000 |
| 30 | 20 February | Hibernian | H | 0–0 | | 8,500 |
| 31 | 27 February | Third Lanark | A | 1–0 | Walker | 5,000 |
| 32 | 6 March | Partick Thistle | H | 0–0 | | 6,000 |
| 33 | 13 March | Queen's Park | A | 1–3 | Cail | 6,000 |
| 34 | 20 March | Airdrieonians | H | 3–0 | Brewster, Cail, Main | 5,500 |
| 35 | 27 March | Rangers | A | 1–1 | W. Wylie | 10,000 |
| 36 | 3 April | Heart of Midlothian | H | 0–0 | | 6,000 |
| 37 | 10 April | Celtic | A | 0–1 | | 10,000 |
| 38 | 17 April | Hamilton Academical | H | 1–0 | J. Wyllie | 4,000 |

==== Final standings ====
| Pos | Team | Pld | W | D | L | GF | GA | GD | Pts |
|---|---|---|---|---|---|---|---|---|---|
| 13 | Kilmarnock | 38 | 15 | 4 | 19 | 55 | 59 | −4 | 34 |
| 14 | Dundee | 38 | 12 | 9 | 17 | 43 | 61 | −18 | 33 |
| 15 | Aberdeen | 38 | 11 | 11 | 16 | 39 | 52 | −13 | 33 |
| 16 | Third Lanark | 38 | 10 | 12 | 16 | 51 | 57 | −6 | 32 |
| 17 | Clyde | 38 | 12 | 6 | 20 | 44 | 59 | −15 | 30 |

=== Scottish Cup ===
There was no Scottish Cup this season due to the competition being suspended because of the First World War.

== Squad ==
=== Appearances & Goals ===
| No. | Pos | Nat | Player | Total | | Division One | |
| No. | Pos | Nat | Player | Apps | Goals | Apps | Goals |
|---|---|---|---|---|---|---|---|
| | GK | (England) ENG | George Anderson | 29 | 0 | 29 | 0 |
| | FW | (Scotland) SCO | Bobby Archibald | 31 | 3 | 31 | 3 |
| | MF | (Scotland) SCO | Dod Brewster | 25 | 2 | 25 | 2 |
| | FW | (Scotland) SCO | Sam Cail | 35 | 9 | 35 | 9 |
| | MF | (Scotland) SCO | Charlie Chatwin | 22 | 1 | 22 | 1 |
| | DF | (Scotland) SCO | Donald Colman (c) | 37 | 0 | 37 | 0 |
| | GK | (Scotland) SCO | Andy Greig | 9 | 0 | 9 | 0 |
| | DF | (Scotland) SCO | Bobby Hannah | 1 | 0 | 1 | 0 |
| | DF | (Scotland) SCO | Jock Hume | 23 | 0 | 23 | 0 |
| | MF | (Scotland) SCO | Bert MacLachlan | 36 | 4 | 36 | 4 |
| | FW | (Scotland) SCO | Dave Main | 24 | 5 | 24 | 5 |
| | FW | (Scotland) SCO | Angus McLeod | 6 | 1 | 6 | 1 |
| | DF | (Scotland) SCO | Jock Munro | 14 | 0 | 14 | 0 |
| | FW | (Scotland) SCO | John Scorgie | 1 | 0 | 1 | 0 |
| | FW | (Scotland) SCO | Jimmy Soye | 32 | 1 | 32 | 1 |
| | FW | (Scotland) SCO | Joseph Walker | 34 | 8 | 34 | 8 |
| | MF | (Scotland) SCO | Jock Wyllie | 34 | 4 | 34 | 4 |
| | FW | (England) ENG | Willie Wylie | 25 | 1 | 25 | 1 |
