= Donald Colman =

Scottish footballer and manager

Personal information
- Full name: Donald Cameron Cunningham
- Date of birth: 14 August 1878
- Place of birth: Renton, Scotland
- Date of death: 4 October 1942 (aged 64)
- Place of death: Aberdeen, Scotland
- Height: 1.68 m (5 ft 6 in)
- Position: Right-back

Senior career*
Years	Team	Apps	(Gls)
- Glasgow Perthshire
- Tontine Athletic
- Renton
- Maryhill
1905–1907	Motherwell	41	(0)
1907–1920	Aberdeen	323	(1)
1920–1925	Dumbarton	51	(0)
Total		415	(1)

International career
1911–1913	Scotland	4	(0)
1910–1911	Scottish League XI	2	(0)

Managerial career
- 1922-1931: Dumbarton
- * Club domestic league appearances and goals

Donald Cameron Cunningham (14 August 1878 – 4 October 1942), known as Donald Colman, was a Scottish football player and coach (or trainer) in the early years of the 20th century, most notably for Aberdeen. His career in senior football did not begin until he was in his late twenties, and he was capped by Scotland at the late age of 33. As a coach, he was renowned partly as the inventor of the dugout, a sunken, sheltered area for note taking, which he introduced at Aberdeen's Pittodrie Stadium, making it the first football stadium to feature this innovation.

== Junior career ==
Colman was born and brought up in the Dunbartonshire town of Renton, home of Renton F.C., an early power in the Scottish game. The young Colman was passionate about football, and had helped out at his local club as a boy before signing to play for the Junior club Glasgow Perthshire. Colman feared that his choice of profession would not be favoured by his parents, and signed under his grandmother's name of Colman - by the time he was accepted by his family as a professional footballer, he felt that it was too late to revert, so he was known throughout his football career as Donald Colman.

From Glasgow Perthshire, Colman moved to a number of other junior clubs, including Maryhill and his hometown club, but a career in senior football seemed to have eluded him in spite of interest at various times from Hibs and Sunderland. He was considered to be too small in stature to make a professional, and seemed destined to remain a junior player until he was signed by Motherwell at the late age of 27 in 1905.

== Senior playing career ==
Colman played for Motherwell for only two seasons before being released on a free transfer. At the relatively advanced age of 29, it would have been reasonable for him to consider his senior career over. However, he was signed by Aberdeen manager Jimmy Philip in the summer of 1907 and soon established himself as Aberdeen's first choice right-back; becoming club captain in 1909. In 1911–12, Colman was capped three times for Scotland, winning a fourth cap two years later. His career was interrupted but not ended by the First World War, during which he served in France.

After the war, Colman resumed his Aberdeen career, and was still playing regularly during his final season at the club in 1920, after which he moved to Dumbarton as player-coach. He was reported to have still been an active player in 1925, at the age of 47.

== Coaching career ==
While player-coach at Dumbarton, Colman regularly travelled to Norway in the summer months to coach football at SK Brann of Bergen. He was recalled to Aberdeen as coach in 1931 by Phillips' successor, Paddy Travers. Colman's second spell at Aberdeen was as notable as his first - he was an innovative and influential coach, spending much time and effort on players' footwork and working on ideas such as possession football and using space. He was convinced of the importance of watching his players' feet, and to help with this, devised the dugout - a sheltered area, set below pitch level which allowed him to observe his players' feet as they played, as well as keeping the trainer sheltered from whatever the weather might throw at the park. Donald had his first dugout installed at the halfway line in front to the Pittodrie enclosure in the summer of 1934. It remained virtually unchanged until it was replaced during redevelopment of the Main Stand in the summer of 1968. Before this innovation, trainers usually sat on a bench at the trackside. The idea quickly spread through the game in Britain and further afield, and examples of dugouts at football grounds can still be seen to this day.

== Personal life and death ==
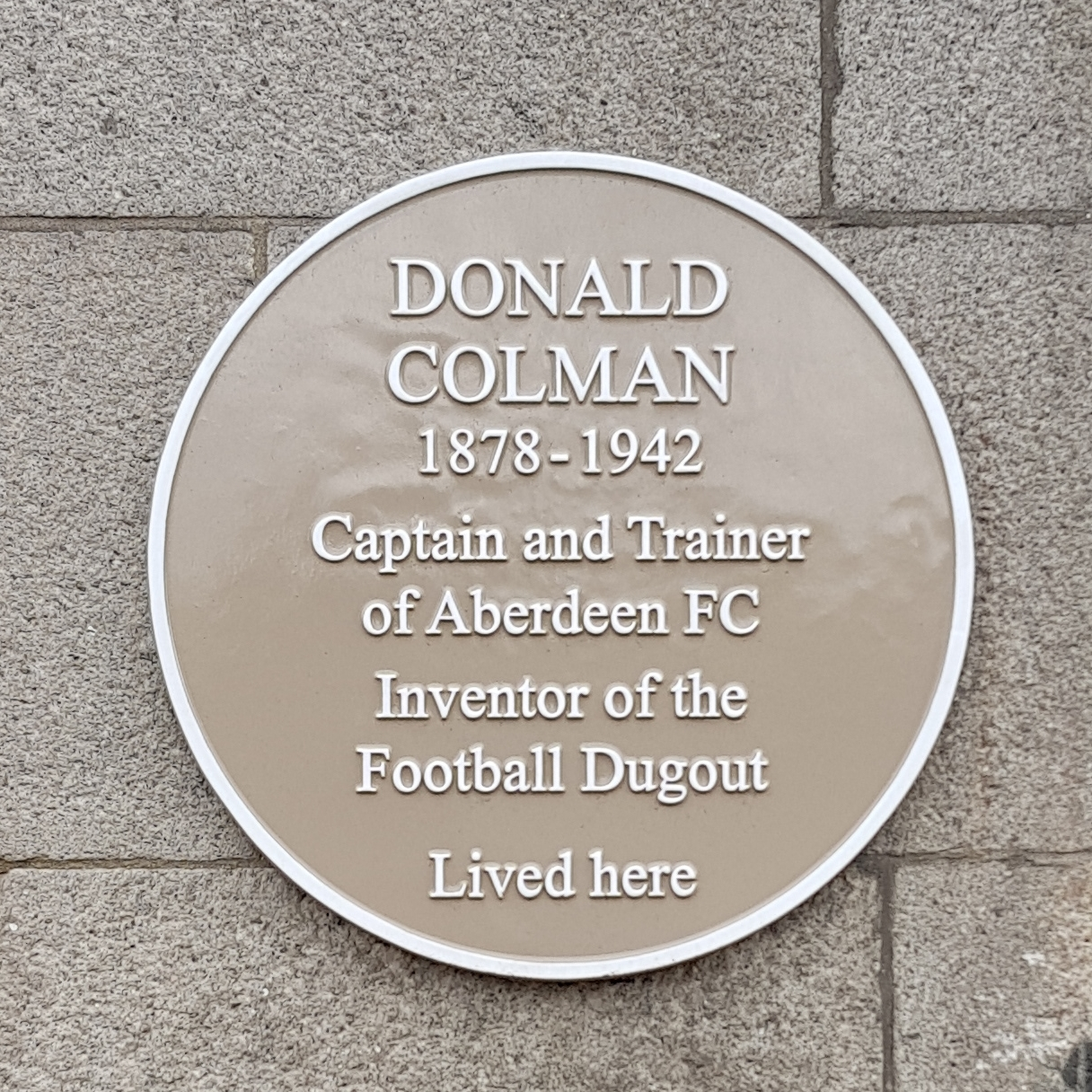
Commemorative plaque to Donald Colman, on King Street, Aberdeen

Colman, as befits his reputation as a late starter, did not marry until he was 46. He fathered two children, Edna and Donald, and lived in Aberdeen until his death from tuberculosis in 1942. His great-granddaughter, Rachel Corsie, is also a footballer and captains the Scotland national team.

In November 2018, he was one of four inductees into the Aberdeen Hall of Fame.

== Career statistics ==
=== Club ===
Appearances and goals by club, season and competition
Club	Season	League			Scottish Cup		Total	
Club	Season	Division	Apps	Goals	Apps	Goals	Apps	Goals
Motherwell	1905–06	Scottish Division One	-	0	0	0	-	0
Motherwell	1906–07	Scottish Division One	-	0	0	0	-	0
Motherwell	Total		41	0	0	0	41	0
Aberdeen	1907–08	Scottish Division One	28	0	6	0	34	0
Aberdeen	1908–09	Scottish Division One	34	0	2	0	36	0
Aberdeen	1909–10	Scottish Division One	34	0	3	0	37	0
Aberdeen	1910–11	Scottish Division One	32	0	4	0	36	0
Aberdeen	1911–12	Scottish Division One	32	0	3	0	35	0
Aberdeen	1912–13	Scottish Division One	33	0	1	0	34	0
Aberdeen	1913–14	Scottish Division One	34	0	2	0	36	0
Aberdeen	1914–15	Scottish Division One	37	0	-	-	37	0
Aberdeen	1915–16	Scottish Division One	26	0	-	-	26	0
Aberdeen	1916–17	Scottish Division One	22	1	-	-	22	0
Aberdeen	1917–18	Scottish Division One	Aberdeen withdrew from competitive football due to the First World War					
Aberdeen	1918–19	Scottish Division One	Aberdeen withdrew from competitive football due to the First World War					
Aberdeen	1919–20	Scottish Division One	11	0	2	0	13	0
Aberdeen	Total		323	1	23	0	346	1
Dumbarton	1920–21	Scottish Division One	17	0	3	0	20	0
Dumbarton	1921–22	Scottish Division Two	24	0	1	0	25	0
Dumbarton	1922–23	Scottish Division Two	9	0	0	0	9	0
Dumbarton	1923–24	Scottish Division Two	1	0	0	0	1	0
Dumbarton	1924–25	Scottish Division Two	0	0	0	0	0	0
Dumbarton	Total		51	0	4	0	55	0
Career stats			415	1	27	0	442	1

=== International ===
Appearances and goals by national team and year
National team	Year	Apps	Goals
Scotland	1911	3	0
Scotland	1912	—	
Scotland	1913	1	0
Total		4	0

=== Managerial record ===
Team	From	To	Record				
Team	From	To	P	W	L	D	Win %
Dumbarton	1922	1931	359	139	65	155	39.71%

== See also ==
- List of Scotland national football team captains

Sporting positions
Preceded by Alex Halkett	Aberdeen FC captain 1909-1914	Succeeded by Bert MacLachlan
