= Jock Hume (footballer) =

Scottish footballer

Personal information
- Full name: John Hume
- Date of birth: 17 August 1885
- Place of birth: Leith, Scotland
- Date of death: 23 October 1962 (aged 77)
- Place of death: Aberdeen, Scotland
- Height: 5 ft 10 1/2 in (1.79 m)
- Position: Defender

Senior career*
| Years | Team | Apps | (Gls) |
- Broxburn
| 1907–1920 | Aberdeen | 282 | (3) |
| 1913 | → Airdrieonians (loan) | 0 | (0) |
| 1920–1922 | Darwen | | |
| 1922–1923 | Arbroath | 5 | (0) |
| 1923 | Peterhead | | |
| Total | | 287 | (3) |
- * Club domestic league appearances and goals

John Hume (17 August 1885 – 23 October 1962) was a Scottish professional footballer who played for Scottish First Division club Aberdeen as a defender.

Hume made over 300 appearances for Aberdeen before leaving in 1920 to go to Darwen in England as a coach. He later emigrated to the United States after brief spells with Arbroath and Peterhead, but eventually returned to Scotland.

In February 1913, he joined Airdrieonians for one game only, a Scottish Cup tie against St Mirren.

== Career statistics ==
=== Club ===
Appearances and goals by club, season and competition
| Club | Season | League | | | Scottish Cup | | Total | |
| Club | Season | Division | Apps | Goals | Apps | Goals | Apps | Goals |
|---|---|---|---|---|---|---|---|---|
| Aberdeen | 1907-08 | Scottish Division One | 33 | 0 | 6 | 0 | 39 | 0 |
| Aberdeen | 1908-09 | Scottish Division One | 30 | 0 | 2 | 0 | 32 | 0 |
| Aberdeen | 1909-10 | Scottish Division One | 32 | 1 | 3 | 0 | 35 | 1 |
| Aberdeen | 1910-11 | Scottish Division One | 32 | 0 | 4 | 0 | 36 | 0 |
| Aberdeen | 1911-12 | Scottish Division One | 32 | 1 | 5 | 0 | 37 | 1 |
| Aberdeen | 1912-13 | Scottish Division One | 21 | 1 | 0 | 0 | 21 | 1 |
| Aberdeen | 1913-14 | Scottish Division One | 16 | 0 | 0 | 0 | 16 | 0 |
| Aberdeen | 1914-15 | Scottish Division One | 23 | 0 | - | | 23 | 0 |
| Aberdeen | 1915-16 | Scottish Division One | 30 | 0 | - | | 30 | 0 |
| Aberdeen | 1916-17 | Scottish Division One | 3 | 0 | - | | 3 | 0 |
| Aberdeen | 1917-18 | Scottish Division One | Aberdeen Dropped Out of Competitive Football due to WW1 | | | | | |
| Aberdeen | 1918-19 | Scottish Division One | Aberdeen Dropped Out of Competitive Football due to WW1 | | | | | |
| Aberdeen | 1919-20 | Scottish Division One | 30 | 0 | 3 | 0 | 33 | 0 |
| Aberdeen | Total | | 282 | 3 | 23 | 0 | 305 | 3 |
| Airdrieonians (loan) | 1912-13 | Scottish Division One | 0 | 0 | 1 | 0 | 1 | 0 |
| Darwen | 1920-21 | Lancashire Combination | - | - | - | - | - | - |
| Darwen | 1921-22 | Lancashire Combination | - | - | - | - | - | - |
| Darwen | Total | | - | - | 1 | - | 1 | - |
| Arbroath | 1922-23 | Scottish Division Two | 5 | 0 | 0 | 0 | 5 | 0 |
| Arbroath | Total | | 5 | 0 | 0 | 0 | 5 | 0 |
| Peterhead | 1922-23 | Aberdeenshire | - | - | - | - | - | - |
| Peterhead | Total | | - | - | - | - | - | - |
| Career total | | | 287+ | 3+ | 24+ | 0+ | 311+ | 3+ |
