= 1909–10 Aberdeen F.C. season =

Aberdeen F.C.
1909–10 season
- Chairman: Thomas Duncan
- Manager: Jimmy Philip
- Scottish Football League Division One: 4th
- Scottish Cup: Third round
- Top goalscorer: League: Bobby Simpson (10); All: Bobby Simpson (11)
- Highest home attendance: 14,000 vs. Celtic, 27 November 1909
- Lowest home attendance: 1,500 vs. Hamilton Academical, 20 April 1910

Aberdeen F.C. competed in Scottish Football League Division One and the Scottish Cup in season 1909–10.

== Overview ==
The 1909–10 season was Aberdeen's 7th season and 5th season in the top flight. This season saw Aberdeen finish fourth out of 18 clubs in the league, their highest league position since joining Division One in 1905. In the Scottish Cup, they were knocked out in the third round by Celtic. New signings included forward Jimmy Soye from Newcastle United, who scored on his debut for the Wasps.

== Results ==
=== Scottish División One ===
Match Day	Date	Opponent	H/A	Score	Aberdeen Scorer(s)	Attendance
1	21 August	Port Glasgow Athletic	A	3–0	H. Murray, Soye, Lennie	4,000
2	28 August	Third Lanark	H	2–1	T. Murray, Lennie	10,000
3	4 September	Heart of Midlothian	A	0–0		12,000
4	18 September	Rangers	A	1–2	Moffat	16,000
5	25 September	Hibernian	H	1–0	Soye	10,500
6	27 September	Queen's Park	H	3–1	Own goal, McEchern, Simpson	10,000
7	2 October	St Mirren	H	2–0	Lennie, Soye	9,500
8	9 October	Airdrieonians	H	1–0	Simpson	10,000
9	16 October	Clyde	A	1–2	Own goal	8,000
10	23 October	Motherwell	H	2–2	Simpson, Soye	6,000
11	30 October	Falkirk	A	0–1		8,500
12	6 November	Port Glasgow Athletic	H	3–0	Simpson (2), Soye	5,500
13	13 November	Hamilton Academical	A	0–1		4,000
14	20 November	Morton	A	1–0	Lennie	6,000
15	27 November	Celtic	H	0–1		14,000
16	4 December	Falkirk	H	0–1		8,000
17	11 December	Partick Thistle	A	1–1	Simpson	7,500
18	25 December	Airdrieonians	A	3–1	Miller, Simpson, Lennie	2,500
19	1 January	Dundee	A	0–0		14,000
20	3 January	Partick Thistle	H	1–1	O'Hagan	4,500
21	8 January	Motherwell	A	1–2	McKay	4,000
22	15 January	Clyde	H	1–1	McKay	4,500
23	26 February	Kilmarnock	A	2–0	Simpson, Lennie	4,000
24	5 March	Rangers	H	1–1	T. Murray	8,000
25	12 March	Heart of Midlothian	H	3–0	Simpson, T. Murray, O'Hagan	3,500
26	19 March	St Mirren	A	2–1	Lennie (2)	4,000
27	26 March	Kilmarnock	H	0–1		6,500
28	2 April	Morton	H	1–0	Simpson	5,000
29	9 April	Celtic	A	0–2		3,000
30	16 April	Third Lanark	A	0–2		1,000
31	18 April	Hibernian	A	2–1	T. Murray, O'Hagan	1,500
32	20 April	Hamilton Academical	H	1–0	O'Hagan	1,500
33	23 April	Dundee	H	3–1	Wilson, T. Murray, O'Hagan	8,000
34	30 April	Queen's Park	A	2–2	Hume, T. Murray	7,000

==== Final standings ====
Pos	Team	Pld	W	D	L	GF	GA	GD	Pts
2	Falkirk	34	22	8	4	71	28	+43	52
3	Rangers	34	20	6	8	70	35	+35	46
4	Aberdeen	34	16	8	10	44	29	+15	40
5	Clyde	34	14	9	11	47	40	+7	37
6	Dundee	34	14	8	12	52	44	+8	36

=== Scottish Cup ===
Round	Date	Opponent	H/A	Score	Aberdeen Scorer(s)	Attendance
R1	5 February	Bo'ness	H	3–0	H. Murray, Wilson, O'Hagan	5,000
R2	12 February	Airdrieonians	H	3–0	Simpson, Soye, Lennie	7,000
R3	19 February	Celtic	A	1–2	Own goal	27,000

== Squad ==
=== Appearances & Goals ===
No.	Pos	Nat	Player	Total		Division One		Scottish Cup	
No.	Pos	Nat	Player	Apps	Goals	Apps	Goals	Apps	Goals
	DF	(Scotland) SCO	Donald Colman (c)	37	0	34	0	3	0
	DF	(Scotland) SCO	Stewart Davidson	20	0	19	0	1	0
	DF	(Scotland) SCO	Archie Harper	2	0	2	0	0	0
	DF	(Scotland) SCO	Jock Hume	34	1	31	1	3	0
	FW	(Scotland) SCO	Willie Lennie	34	9	31	8	3	1
	DF	(Scotland) SCO	Willie Low	1	0	1	0	0	0
	MF	(Scotland) SCO	George MacFarlane	9	0	6	0	3	0
	FW	(Scotland) SCO	Vic McEchern	5	1	5	1	0	0
	FW	(Scotland) SCO	Hector McKay	2	2	2	2	0	0
	FW	(Scotland) SCO	George McKenzie	1	0	1	0	0	0
	MF	(Scotland) SCO	James Miller	37	1	34	1	3	0
	MF	(Scotland) SCO	Joe Moffat	14	1	14	1	0	0
	FW	(Scotland) SCO	Herbert Murray	34	2	31	1	3	1
	FW	(Scotland) SCO	Tom Murray	34	2	31	1	3	1
	GK	(Scotland) SCO	Cody Mutch	37	0	34	0	3	0
	FW	(Scotland) SCO	WD Nicol	2	0	2	0	0	0
	FW	(Ireland) EIR	Charlie O'Hagan	32	6	29	5	3	1
	FW	(Scotland) SCO	Stewart Scott	1	0	1	0	0	0
	FW	(England) ENG	Bobby Simpson	33	11	30	10	3	1
	FW	(Scotland) SCO	Jimmy Soye	25	6	23	5	2	1
	MF	(Scotland) SCO	George Wilson	32	2	29	1	3	1
