= Jimmy Soye =

Scottish footballer (1885–1974)

Personal information
- Full name: James Soye
- Date of birth: 14 April 1885
- Place of birth: Govan, Scotland
- Date of death: 2 January 1974 (aged 88)
- Place of death: Lurgan, Armagh, Northern Ireland
- Height: 5 ft 8 in (1.73 m)
- Position: Inside forward

Senior career*
Years	Team	Apps	(Gls)
- Rutherglen Glencairn
1904–1905	Distillery		
1905–1906	Southampton	18	(5)
1906–1909	Newcastle United	7	(2)
1909–1915	Aberdeen	187	(21)
1915–1917	Distillery		
1917–1919+	Glenavon		

International career
1911	Scottish Football League XI	1	(0)
- * Club domestic league appearances and goals

James Soye (14 April 1885 – 7 October 1974) was a Scottish professional footballer who played as an inside-forward for various clubs in Scotland, Ireland and England in the period prior to World War I.

== Football career ==
Soye was born in the Govan area of Glasgow and trained as an electrical engineer. After playing Junior Football for Rutherglen Glencairn, Soye moved to Belfast where he had a trial with Belfast Celtic before joining Distillery at the end of the 1903–04 season.

In his one season at Distillery, his 14 goals helped the Whites win three trophies, the Irish Cup, the City Cup and the County Antrim Shield when he scored in the Final.

In the summer of 1905, he moved to southern England to join Southampton of the Southern League. The "Saints" were anxious to regain the Southern League title which they had taken six times in the eight years up to 1904, but had finished in a disappointing third place at the end of the 1904–05 season. He made his debut away to Norwich City on 9 September 1905 when he played at inside-right in a 1–1 draw. Although Soye was only 5 ft 8 in tall, he was "muscular and clever enough to avoid the more robust challenges". He soon became an established member of the side, helping the forwards Fred Harrison and Harry Brown to score, as well as contributing the occasional goal himself, including both goals in a 2–1 victory against Queens Park Rangers on 4 November. As the season progressed, his form trailed off and by the end of January, he had lost his place to Frank Jefferis. At the end of the season, Southampton finished as runners-up, five points behind champions Fulham.

In May 1906, he moved to Newcastle United of the Football League First Division, together with his Southampton teammate, Harry Brown. At St James' Park, Soye was unable to break into the first-team on a regular basis, with Scotland international James Howie well settled in the inside-right berth. Although Newcastle won the Football League championship in the 1905–06 season, Soye made only one appearance followed by six appearances, with two goals, in the following season. He spent the entire 1907–08 season in the reserves and, after only seven first-team appearances in three years, he returned to Scotland.

In May 1909, he was part of the deal which brought Wilf Low to St James' Park for a fee of £800 from Aberdeen. At Pittodrie, Soye made his debut scoring in a 3–0 defeat of Port Glasgow Athletic and soon became an established member of the team, settling into the right-wing position. Over the next six seasons, Soye made over 200 league and cup appearances for the "Dons" and was also "capped" by the Scottish Football League against the Southern League on 2 October 1911. The outbreak of the First World War brought his career to a close.

After his football career, Soye remained in Lurgan, Northern Ireland (where his career ended with Glenavon) and worked as a farmer.

== Career statistics ==
Appearances and goals by club, season and competition
Club	Season	League			National Cup		Total	
Club	Season	Division	Apps	Goals	Apps	Goals	Apps	Goals
Southampton	1905–06	Southern Football League	18	5	0	0	18	5
Newcastle United	1906–07	First Division	1	0	0	0	1	0
Newcastle United	1907–08	First Division	6	2	0	0	6	2
Newcastle United	1908–09	First Division	0	0	0	0	0	0
Newcastle United	Total		7	2	0	0	7	2
Aberdeen	1909–10	Scottish Division One	23	6	2	1	25	7
Aberdeen	1910–11	Scottish Division One	33	5	4	1	37	6
Aberdeen	1911–12	Scottish Division One	32	5	5	2	37	7
Aberdeen	1912–13	Scottish Division One	32	2	1	0	33	2
Aberdeen	1913–14	Scottish Division One	35	2	2	1	37	3
Aberdeen	1914–15	Scottish Division One	32	1	0	0	32	1
Aberdeen	Total		187	21	14	5	201	26
Career total			212	28	14	5	226	33

== Honours ==
Distillery

- Irish Cup: 1905
- City Cup: 1905
- County Antrim Shield: 1905

Southampton

- Southern League runners-up: 1905–06

Aberdeen

- Scottish Football League runners-up: 1910–11
