= Alex Wright (footballer, born 1897) =

Scottish footballer (1895–1968)

Personal information
- Full name: Alexander Wright
- Date of birth: 25 May 1895
- Place of birth: Aberdeen, Scotland
- Date of death: 29 July 1968 (aged 73)
- Place of death: Edinburgh, Scotland
- Height: 6 ft 0 in (1.83 m)
- Position: Half-back

Youth career
- Aberdeen Boys Brigade

Senior career*
Years	Team	Apps	(Gls)
1913–1922	Aberdeen East End		
1913–1922	Aberdeen	126	(8)
1922–1927	Heart of Midlothian	128	(3)
1927–1928	Morton	11	(1)
1928–1931	Queen of the South	84	(12)
Total		349	(24)

International career
1922	Scottish League XI	1	(0)

Managerial career
- 1928–1931: Queen of the South
- * Club domestic league appearances and goals

Alexander Wright was a Scottish football player and manager who played as a half back for Aberdeen, Heart of Midlothian, Greenock Morton and Queen of the South.

== Playing career ==
Wright began playing with Aberdeen when he was only 16. He remained at the Dons until 1922, captaining the side in his latter years at the club. He was regarded as one of the best half backs in Scotland and gained representative honours when he played for the Scottish League against the English League. He made 143 appearances and scored 11 goals for the club. During the First World War he served with the Gordon Highlanders and Royal Engineers. When serving in London he also appeared at Millwall.

Wright joined Heart of Midlothian for an estimated fee of £2500 in 1922 – a record fee for an Aberdeen player at the time – and remained a prominent figure in Scottish football. For three successive seasons, he played in the annual East v West trial for the Scotland national team. Wright spent five seasons with Hearts.

Wright joined Morton in 1927 for a fee of £800.

== Managerial career ==
On 1 June 1928 when aged 31, he was interviewed by the Board of Directors from which he was announced as starting immediately as the first Secretary Manager of the Dumfries club, Queen of the South. He filled three roles at the club as he also signed himself as a player. In his first season, he was sent off when playing away in a 2–0 defeat at Albion Rovers on 24 November. He was at Palmerston Park until 1931.

== Career statistics ==
=== Club ===
Appearances and goals by club, season and competition
Club	Season	League			Scottish Cup		Total	
Club	Season	Division	Apps	Goals	Apps	Goals	Apps	Goals
Aberdeen	1913–14	Scottish Division One	11	0	2	0	13	0
Aberdeen	1914–15	Scottish Division One	–	–	–	–	–	–
Aberdeen	1915–16	Scottish Division One	6	1	–	–	6	1
Aberdeen	1916–17	Scottish Division One	1	0	–	–	1	0
Aberdeen	1917–18	Scottish Division One	Aberdeen withdrew from competitive football due to the First World War					
Aberdeen	1918–19	Scottish Division One	Aberdeen withdrew from competitive football due to the First World War					
Aberdeen	1919–20	Scottish Division One	42	2	4	1	46	3
Aberdeen	1920–21	Scottish Division One	26	3	4	0	30	3
Aberdeen	1921–22	Scottish Division One	40	2	6	1	46	3
Aberdeen	Total		126	8	16	2	142	10
Heart of Midlothian	1922–23	Scottish Division One	33	1	2	0	35	1
Heart of Midlothian	1923–24	Scottish Division One	28	0	5	0	33	0
Heart of Midlothian	1924–25	Scottish Division One	24	0	0	0	24	0
Heart of Midlothian	1925–26	Scottish Division One	36	0	5	0	41	0
Heart of Midlothian	1926–27	Scottish Division One	7	2	0	0	7	2
Heart of Midlothian	Total		128	3	12	0	140	3

=== Managerial ===
Managerial record by team and tenure
Team	From	To	Record				
Team	From	To	P	W	L	D	Win %
Queen of the South	1928	1931	119	54	47	18	45.38%
