= Bobby Hannah =

Scottish footballer

Personal information
- Full name: Robert Hannah
- Date of birth: 4 May 1887
- Place of birth: Aberdeen, Scotland
- Date of death: 1 May 1947 (aged 59)
- Place of death: Chicago, Illinois, USA
- Height: 5 ft 7 in (1.70 m)
- Position: Defender

Youth career
- East End

Senior career*
Years	Team	Apps	(Gls)
1911–1921	Aberdeen	116	(1)
- * Club domestic league appearances and goals

Bobby Hannah was a Scottish professional football defender who played for Aberdeen.

Hannah signed for Aberdeen in 1908 from local club East End, but made his debut in 1911. His career was interrupted while he served in the First World War, but he returned to Aberdeen in 1919. He played for Peterhead after leaving Aberdeen in 1921, then went on to play in the USA.

== Career statistics ==
=== Appearances and goals by club, season and competition ===
Club	Season	League			Scottish Cup		Total	
Club	Season	Division	Apps	Goals	Apps	Goals	Apps	Goals
Aberdeen	1908–09	Scottish Division One	0	0	0	0	0	0
Aberdeen	1909–10	Scottish Division One	0	0	0	0	0	0
Aberdeen	1910–11	Scottish Division One	2	0	0	0	2	0
Aberdeen	1911–12	Scottish Division One	2	0	2	0	4	0
Aberdeen	1912–13	Scottish Division One	20	1	1	0	21	1
Aberdeen	1913–14	Scottish Division One	26	0	2	0	28	0
Aberdeen	1914–15	Scottish Division One	1	0	0	0	1	0
Aberdeen	Total		51	1	5	0	56	1
Aberdeen	1918–19	Aberdeen withdrew from competitive football due to the First World War						
Aberdeen	1919–20	Scottish Division One	36	0	2	0	38	0
Aberdeen	1920–21	Scottish Division One	26	0	4	0	30	0
Aberdeen	1921–22	Scottish Division One	3	0	0	0	3	0
Aberdeen	Total		65	0	6	0	71	0
Career total			116	1	11	0	127	1
