= Paddy Travers =

Scottish footballer (1883–1962)

Personal information
- Full name: Patrick Travers
- Date of birth: 28 May 1883
- Place of birth: Beith, Scotland
- Date of death: 5 February 1962 (aged 78)
- Place of death: Dublin, Ireland
- Height: 5 ft 8 in (1.73 m)
- Position: Inside left

Youth career
- Renfrew Victoria

Senior career*
Years	Team	Apps	(Gls)
1900–1901	Thornliebank		
1901–1902	Barnsley	13	(4)
1902–1903	Thornliebank		
1903–1904	Barnsley	8	(0)
1904	Thornliebank		
1904–1907	New Brompton		
1907–1908	Renton		
1908–1910	Clyde	36	(8)
1910–1911	Aberdeen	34	(10)
1911–1912	Celtic	18	(3)
1912–1914	Aberdeen	63	(11)
1914–1917	Dumbarton	92	(10)
1917–1919	Clydebank	61	(12)
1920	Vale of Leven		
1920	Dumbarton Harp		
1920–1922	Dumbarton	17	(0)

Managerial career
- 1920–1922: Dumbarton
- 1923–1938: Aberdeen
- 1938–1956: Clyde
- * Club domestic league appearances and goals

Patrick Travers (28 May 1883 – 5 February 1962) was a Scottish football player and manager in the first half of the 20th century. He played for many clubs in his native Scotland and for Barnsley in England, before becoming involved in coaching, and later, management, winning the Scottish Cup with Clyde on two occasions either side of World War II.

== Playing career ==
Raised in Renfrew, Travers first played for his hometown team Renfrew Victoria around the turn of the century. In 1901 he played 13 games for Barnsley, before returning to Scotland to play for Thornliebank. He had a further spell at Barnsley, then went back to Thornliebank, followed by games for New Brompton and Renton before moving to Clyde.

In 1910, Travers was signed by Jimmy Philip to play for Aberdeen, but only played one season for them before returning to Glasgow, where he had business interests, to play for Celtic. He had one season with the Bhoys, playing regularly after coming in for the injured Jimmy McMenemy until he himself was injured and Patsy Gallacher took the place, resulting in him missing out on the latter stages of the 1911–12 Scottish Cup as the club won the competition. He then returned to Aberdeen, and this time stayed until the end of the 1913–14 season when he moved on to Dumbarton. He spent the remainder of his playing career in the West Dunbartonshire area, also playing for Clydebank, Vale of Leven and Dumbarton Harp.

== Managerial career ==
=== Aberdeen ===
Travers coached in Norway and was trainer then player-manager of Dumbarton before being engaged to coach Aberdeen in 1922. He remained in that position until the retirement of Philip in the summer of 1924. One of his first acts as manager was the signing of Alec Jackson, together with his brother George. Jackson went on to be one of the most renowned players of his generation. In spite of this, however, Travers' first season in charge ended with relegation only avoided on goal difference. In the following seasons, many players came and went – Travers worked hard in the transfer market of the time, and his dealings are credited with improving the club's previously precarious financial situation.

Travers' Aberdeen were the first Scottish club to tour South Africa in 1927. He also oversaw club tours of Norway in 1929, Scandinavia in 1933, and South Africa again in 1937.

In 1931, Travers mysteriously dropped three of the club's regular players before a match against Falkirk. In all, five players never played for the club again, and it was reported in the 1970s that this was the result of an alleged plot to win fixed-odds bets on half-time and full-time scores. No police action was ever taken, and many of those involved protested their innocence for the remainder of their lives. The same year, he brought Donald Colman to the club from Dumbarton to act as a coach.

Between April and September 1936, the team set a club record seven consecutive away league game wins.

In 1937, Travers took his team to the Scottish Cup final, the first time Aberdeen had ever appeared in the event. They were defeated 2–1 by Celtic in front of a record official attendance of 146,433, although many more spectators may have gained illegal entry. That summer, the club were on a tour of South Africa when outside-right Jackie Benyon died suddenly of peritonitis. Travers remained in charge for two more seasons, but feeling that he no longer had the full support of his directors, accepted an offer to manage Clyde in 1938; he was replaced at Aberdeen by Colman.

=== Clyde ===
The success which had eluded him at Pittodrie soon materialised at Shawfield, however, and the Scottish Cup was won by Travers' Clyde team in 1938–39. He was still manager of Clyde in 1954–55, when the Bully Wee beat Celtic in a replay to win their second Cup. He was also a runner up as manager with Clyde in the Scottish Cup in 1948–49 when Clyde lost 4–1 to Rangers in the final.

Also notably in season 1951–52, Travers led Clyde to four trophies in a single season; the Scottish Division B league title, the B Division Supplementary Cup, the Glasgow Cup and the Glasgow Merchants Charity Cup.

His four Scottish Cup finals earned him a reputation as a "Cup specialist" when named as one of Scotland's 50 greatest managers by the Sunday Herald newspaper.

== Career statistics ==
Appearances and goals by club, season and competition
Club	Season	League			National cup		Total	
Club	Season	Division	Apps	Goals	Apps	Goals	Apps	Goals
Aberdeen	1910–11	Scottish Division One	34	10	4	2	38	12
Celtic	1911–12	Scottish Division One	18	3	4	3	22	6
Aberdeen	1912–13	Scottish Division One	32	7	1	0	33	7
Aberdeen	1913–14	Scottish Division One	31	4	2	1	33	5
Aberdeen	Total		63	11	3	1	66	12
Dumbarton	1914–15	Scottish Division One	37	8	–		37	8
Dumbarton	1915–16	Scottish Division One	21	1	–		21	1
Dumbarton	1916–17	Scottish Division One	34	1	–		34	1
Dumbarton	Total		92	10	0	0	92	10
Dumbarton	1920–21	Scottish Division One	16	0	3	0	19	0
Dumbarton	1921–22	Scottish Division One	1	0	0	0	1	0
Dumbarton	Total		17	0	3	0	20	0
Career total			224	34	14	6	238	40

== Managerial statistics ==
(Note: Does not include wartime competitions or regional tournaments such as the Glasgow Cup.)

Team	Nat	From	To	Record				
Team	Nat	From	To	G	W	D	L	Win %
Dumbarton	(Scotland)	1921	1922	43	10	10	23	23.26
Aberdeen	(Scotland)	1924	1938	571	269	128	174	47.11
Clyde	(Scotland)	1938	1956	468	183	89	196	39.10
Total				1,082	462	227	393	42.70

== Honours ==
=== Player ===
Thornliebank

- Renfrewshire Victoria Cup: 1902–03, 1903–04

Renton

- Dumbartonshire Cup: 1907–08

Aberdeen

- Scottish Division One: Runners-up 1910–11
- North East Cup: 1913–14

Celtic

- Scottish Cup: 1911–12
- Scottish Division One: Runners-up 1911–12

Dumbarton

- Dumbartonshire Cup: 1914–15
- Dumbartonshire Charity Cup: 1916–17

Clydebank

- Dunbartonshire Cup: 1917–18
- Clydebank Charity Cup: 1917–18

=== Manager ===
Dumbarton

- Dumbartonshire Cup: 1921–22
- Dumbartonshire Charity Cup: 1921–22

Aberdeen

- Scottish Cup: Runner-up: 1936–37
- Aberdeenshire Cup (10) : 1924–25, 1925–26, 1926–27, 1927–28, 1928–29, 1929–30, 1930–31, 1931–32, 1932–33, 1933–34
- Aberdeenshire League (4): 1925–26, 1926–27, 1927–28, 1928–29
- Dewar Shield (8): 1926–27, 1928–29, 1930–31, 1931–32, 1932–33, 1933–34, 1935–36, 1936–37

Clyde

- Scottish Cup: 1938–39, 1954–55
  - Runner-up: 1948–49
- Scottish B Division: 1951–52
- Supplementary Cup: 1951–52
- Glasgow Cup: 1946–47, 1951–52
- Glasgow Charity Cup: 1939–40, 1951–52
- Paisley Charity Cup: 1938–39, 1939–40

== See also ==
- List of football managers with the most matches

== Sources ==
- Webster, Jack (2003). The First 100 years of The Dons: The official history of Aberdeen Football Club 1903 - 2003. Hodder & Stoughton, London. ISBN 0-340-82344-5.
- Since 1881: the searchable Premiership and Football League player database
