= 1919–20 Aberdeen F.C. season =

Aberdeen F.C.
1919–20 season
- Chairman: Thomas Duncan
- Manager: Jimmy Philip
- Scottish Football League: 17th
- Scottish Cup: Fourth round
- Top goalscorer: League: Jacky Connon (14); All: Jacky Connon (16)
- Highest home attendance: 25,000 vs. Celtic, 29 November 1919
- Lowest home attendance: 6,000 vs. Partick Thistle, 19 April 1920

Aberdeen F.C. competed in the Scottish Football League and Scottish Cup in season 1919–20.

== Overview ==
Aberdeen returned to league football in 1919 after a two-year absence due to the First World War. They were placed in an expanded Division One, where they finished 17th out of 22 clubs. In the Scottish Cup, they were knocked out in the fourth round by Albion Rovers. A new attendance record was set at Pittodrie when 25,000 fans attended a game against Celtic in November 1919.

== Results ==
=== Scottish Football League ===
Match Day	Date	Opponent	H/A	Score	Aberdeen Scorer(s)	Attendance
1	16 August	Albion Rovers	H	2–0	Robertson (2)	9,000
2	23 August	Rangers	A	2–3	MacLachlan, MacDonald	22,000
3	30 August	Clyde	H	1–0	Hutton	12,500
4	6 September	Hibernian	A	1–2	Connon	15,000
5	8 September	Morton	A	1–3	Archibald	5,500
6	13 September	Ayr United	H	2–1	Brewster (2)	12,000
7	20 September	Hamilton Academical	A	1–2	Wilson	3,500
8	22 September	Dundee	H	2–0	Connon, Hutton	11,500
9	27 September	Morton	H	0–0		12,000
10	4 October	Motherwell	A	3–3	Archibald, Connon, Hutton	8,000
11	11 October	Partick Thistle	A	1–0	Connon	16,000
12	18 October	St Mirren	H	0–1		14,000
13	25 October	Heart of Midlothian	A	1–1	MacDonald	18,500
14	1 November	Airdrieonians	H	2–1	J. Wyllie, Archibald	12,000
15	8 November	Clydebank	A	0–3		4,500
16	15 November	Kilmarnock	H	1–0	MacLachlan	10,000
17	22 November	Raith Rovers	A	2–2	Archibald, MacDonald	7,000
18	29 November	Celtic	H	0–1		25,000
19	6 December	Falkirk	H	1–1	Brewster	10,000
20	13 December	Third Lanark	A	2–2	Connon, Hutton	6,000
21	20 December	Hibernian	H	1–1	A. Wright	10,000
22	27 December	Airdrieonians	A	0–2		4,500
23	1 January	Dundee	A	3–1	A. Wright, Connon (2)	16,000
24	3 January	Hamilton Academical	H	2–0	W. Wylie, Archibald	12,500
25	5 January	Queen's Park	H	1–1	W. Wylie	12,000
26	10 January	Dumbarton	A	0–4		3,000
27	17 January	Heart of Midlothian	H	1–1	Connon	14,000
28	31 January	Clyde	A	0–2		6,500
29	14 February	Queen's Park	A	0–3		12,000
30	28 February	Falkirk	A	1–3	Hutton	5,000
31	13 March	Raith Rovers	H	3–1	Connon (3)	10,000
32	20 March	Rangers	H	0–2		24,000
33	27 March	Third Lanark	H	0–1		10,000
34	3 April	Ayr United	A	0–0		4,000
35	5 April	Albion Rovers	A	1–1	Archibald	7,000
36	10 April	Celtic	A	0–5		12,000
37	12 April	St Mirren	A	1–3	Connon	4,500
38	17 April	Clydebank	H	0–2		11,000
39	19 April	Partick Thistle	H	0–0		6,000
40	21 April	Kilmarnock	A	3–0	Yule, McLaughlin, Connon	3,000
41	24 April	Dumbarton	H	3–4	W. Wylie, Connon, McLaughlin	10,000
42	1 May	Motherwell	H	1–1	Wilson	10,000

==== Final standings ====
Pos	Team	Pld	W	D	L	GF	GA	GD	Pts
15	Heart of Midlothian	42	14	9	19	57	72	−15	37
16	Clyde	42	14	9	19	64	71	−7	37
17	Aberdeen	42	11	13	18	46	64	−18	35
18	Hibernian	42	13	7	22	60	79	−19	33
19	Raith Rovers	42	11	10	21	61	83	−22	32

Source: "1919-1920 SFL - SPFL Archive". SPFL.

=== Scottish Cup ===
Round	Date	Opponent	H/A	Score	Aberdeen Scorer(s)	Attendance
R1	24 January	Cowdenbeath	A	1–0	Own goal	6,300
R2	7 February	Gala Fairydean	H	2–0	A. Wright, Connon	15,500
R3	21 February	Heart of Midlothian	H	1–0	Hutton	21,000
R4	6 March	Albion Rovers	A	1–2	Connon	10,000

== Squad ==
=== Appearances & Goals ===
No.	Pos	Nat	Player	Total		Division One		Scottish Cup	
No.	Pos	Nat	Player	Apps	Goals	Apps	Goals	Apps	Goals
	GK	(England) ENG	George Anderson	46	0	42	0	4	0
	FW	(Scotland) SCO	Bobby Archibald	44	6	40	6	4	0
	MF	(Scotland) SCO	Dod Brewster	22	3	22	3	0	0
	FW	(Scotland) SCO	Sam Cail	2	0	2	0	0	0
	DF	(Scotland) SCO	Donald Colman	13	0	11	0	2	0
	FW	(Scotland) SCO	Jacky Connon	43	16	39	14	4	2
	FW	(Scotland) SCO	Walter Grant	7	0	6	0	1	0
	DF	(Scotland) SCO	Bobby Hannah	38	0	36	0	2	0
	DF	(Scotland) SCO	Jock Hume	33	0	30	0	3	0
	FW	(Scotland) SCO	Jock Hutton	42	6	38	5	4	1
	MF	(Scotland) SCO	Bert MacLachlan (c)	34	2	30	2	4	0
	FW	(Scotland) SCO	Jim Massie	4	0	4	0	0	0
	FW	(Wales) WAL	Ken MacDonald	17	3	16	3	1	0
	MF	(Scotland) SCO	Jim McLaughlin	6	2	6	2	0	0
	DF	(Scotland) SCO	Allan McRobbie	6	0	6	0	0	0
	MF	(Scotland) SCO	Vic Milne	6	0	6	0	0	0
	MF	(Scotland) SCO	Arthur Robertson	22	2	19	2	3	0
	FW	(Scotland) SCO	Colin Watson	1	0	1	0	0	0
	FW	(Scotland) SCO	Andy Wilson	24	2	23	2	1	0
	MF	(Scotland) SCO	Alex Wright	46	3	42	2	4	1
	FW	(Scotland) SCO	Jacky Wright	3	0	3	0	0	0
	FW	(England) ENG	Willie Wylie	20	3	18	3	2	0
	MF	(Scotland) SCO	Jock Wyllie	10	1	7	1	3	0
	FW	(Scotland) SCO	Bobby Yule	15	1	13	1	2	0
