= 1916–17 Aberdeen F.C. season =

Aberdeen F.C.
1916–17 season
- Chairman: Thomas Duncan
- Manager: Jimmy Philip
- Scottish Football League: 20th
- Top goalscorer: League: Harry Ambler (9); All: Harry Ambler (9)
- Highest home attendance: 7,000 vs. Celtic, 24 March 1917
- Lowest home attendance: 250 vs. Ayr United, 6 January 1917

Aberdeen F.C. competed in the Scottish Football League in season 1916–17.

== Overview ==
For the first time in the club's history, Aberdeen finished bottom of the league table. Also this season, club records for the lowest attendance at Pittodrie Stadium and heaviest defeat were set. At the conclusion of the season, Aberdeen (along with other clubs) withdrew from football for two years due to the ongoing First World War.

== Results ==
=== Scottish Football League ===
Match Day	Date	Opponent	H/A	Score	Aberdeen Scorer(s)	Attendance
1	19 August	Partick Thistle	H	2–0	Cumming, Ambler	5,000
2	26 August	Third Lanark	A	0–2		2,500
3	2 September	St Mirren	H	1–1	J. Wyllie	5,000
4	9 September	Dundee	A	1–1	Brewster	7,000
5	16 September	Queen's Park	H	2–4	Colman, Ambler	5,000
6	23 September	Morton	H	1–1	W. Wylie	4,500
7	30 September	Ayr United	A	0–1		3,000
8	7 October	Airdrieonians	H	1–2	Cail	4,000
9	14 October	Clyde	A	0–2		5,500
10	21 October	Kilmarnock	H	1–1	Cail	4,000
11	28 October	Dumbarton	A	1–1	W. Wylie	3,000
12	4 November	Hamilton Academical	H	0–1		4,000
13	11 November	Motherwell	A	2–1	Ambler (2)	4,500
14	18 November	Heart of Midlothian	H	2–0	Ambler (2)	5,500
15	25 November	Celtic	A	0–1		3,000
16	2 December	Motherwell	H	0–1		4,000
17	9 December	Hibernian	A	3–3	Jackson, Main (2)	6,500
18	16 December	Falkirk	H	0–1		2,500
19	23 December	Third Lanark	H	0–1		3,000
20	30 December	St Mirren	A	0–1		5,000
21	1 January	Dundee	H	5–1	Paton, Walker, Ambler, Cail (2)	4,000
22	2 January	Raith Rovers	A	0–3		5,000
23	6 January	Ayr United	H	1–0	Cruickshank	250
24	13 January	Queen's Park	A	1–2	Jackson	3,000
25	20 January	Clyde	H	0–1		3,500
26	27 January	Kilmarnock	A	0–7		2,000
27	3 February	Rangers	H	3–1	Ambler, J. Wyllie (2)	6,000
28	10 February	Heart of Midlothian	A	0–2		7,000
29	17 February	Raith Rovers	H	1–2	Walker	3,000
30	24 February	Airdrieonians	A	1–3	Cail	2,500
31	3 March	Rangers	A	0–1		2,000
32	10 March	Dumbarton	H	2–4	J. Wyllie, Own goal	2,500
33	17 March	Hamilton Academical	A	1–4	Paton	3,000
34	24 March	Celtic	H	0–0		7,000
35	31 March	Partick Thistle	A	0–4		5,000
36	7 April	Falkirk	A	2–4	Ambler, Main	3,500
37	21 April	Hibernian	H	2–1	Main, W. Wylie	5,000
38	28 April	Morton	A	0–2		3,000

==== Final standings ====
Pos	Team	Pld	W	D	L	GF	GA	GD	Pts
16	Dundee	38	13	4	21	58	71	−13	30
16	Hibernian	38	10	10	18	57	72	−15	30
18	Queen's Park	38	11	7	20	56	81	−25	29
19	Raith Rovers	38	8	7	23	42	91	−49	23
20	Aberdeen	38	7	7	24	36	68	−32	21

Source: "1916-1917 SFL - SPFL Archive". SPFL.

=== Scottish Cup ===
The Scottish Cup was suspended this season because of the First World War.

== Squad ==
=== Appearances & Goals ===
No.	Pos	Nat	Player	Total		Division One	
No.	Pos	Nat	Player	Apps	Goals	Apps	Goals
	FW	(Scotland) SCO	Harry Ambler	32	9	32	9
	GK	(England) ENG	George Anderson	38	0	38	0
	MF	(Scotland) SCO	George Brewster	20	1	20	1
	FW	(Scotland) SCO	Sam Cail	31	5	31	5
	DF	(Scotland) SCO	Charlie Calder	35	0	35	0
	DF	(Scotland) SCO	Donald Colman (c)	23	1	23	1
	MF	(Scotland) SCO	Willie Cruickshank	13	1	13	1
	FW	(Scotland) SCO	JF Cumming	11	1	11	1
	FW	(Scotland) SCO	Stewart Davidson	3	0	3	0
	FW	(Scotland) SCO	Tom Duff	3	0	3	0
	MF	(Scotland) SCO	Andy Greig	2	0	2	0
	DF	(Scotland) SCO	Jock Wyllie	3	0	3	0
	MF	(Scotland) SCO	Andy Jackson	10	2	10	2
	MF	(Scotland) SCO	Willie Low	1	0	1	0
	MF	(Scotland) SCO	Bert MacLachlan	1	0	1	0
	FW	(Scotland) SCO	Dave Main	17	4	17	4
	FW	(Scotland) SCO	George McKay	10	0	10	0
	FW	(Scotland) SCO	Rab Mitchell	1	0	1	0
	DF	(Scotland) SCO	Jim Moir	16	0	16	0
	FW	(Scotland) SCO	Alex Murray	1	0	1	0
	FW	(Scotland) SCO	S Paterson	1	0	1	0
	FW	(Scotland) SCO	John Paton	28	2	28	2
	DF	(Scotland) SCO	Alex Perry	16	0	16	0
	MF	(Scotland) SCO	Arthur Robertson	26	0	26	0
	MF	(Scotland) SCO	Jack Robertson	1	0	1	0
	MF	(Scotland) SCO	Colin Streathern	1	0	1	0
	FW	(Scotland) SCO	Alex Thomson	11	0	11	0
	FW	(Scotland) SCO	Joseph Walker	16	2	16	2
	MF	(Scotland) SCO	Alex Wright	1	0	1	0
	FW	(England) ENG	Willie Wylie	34	3	34	3
	FW	(Scotland) SCO	Jock Wyllie	12	4	12	4
