= Assistant referee (association football) =

Football official

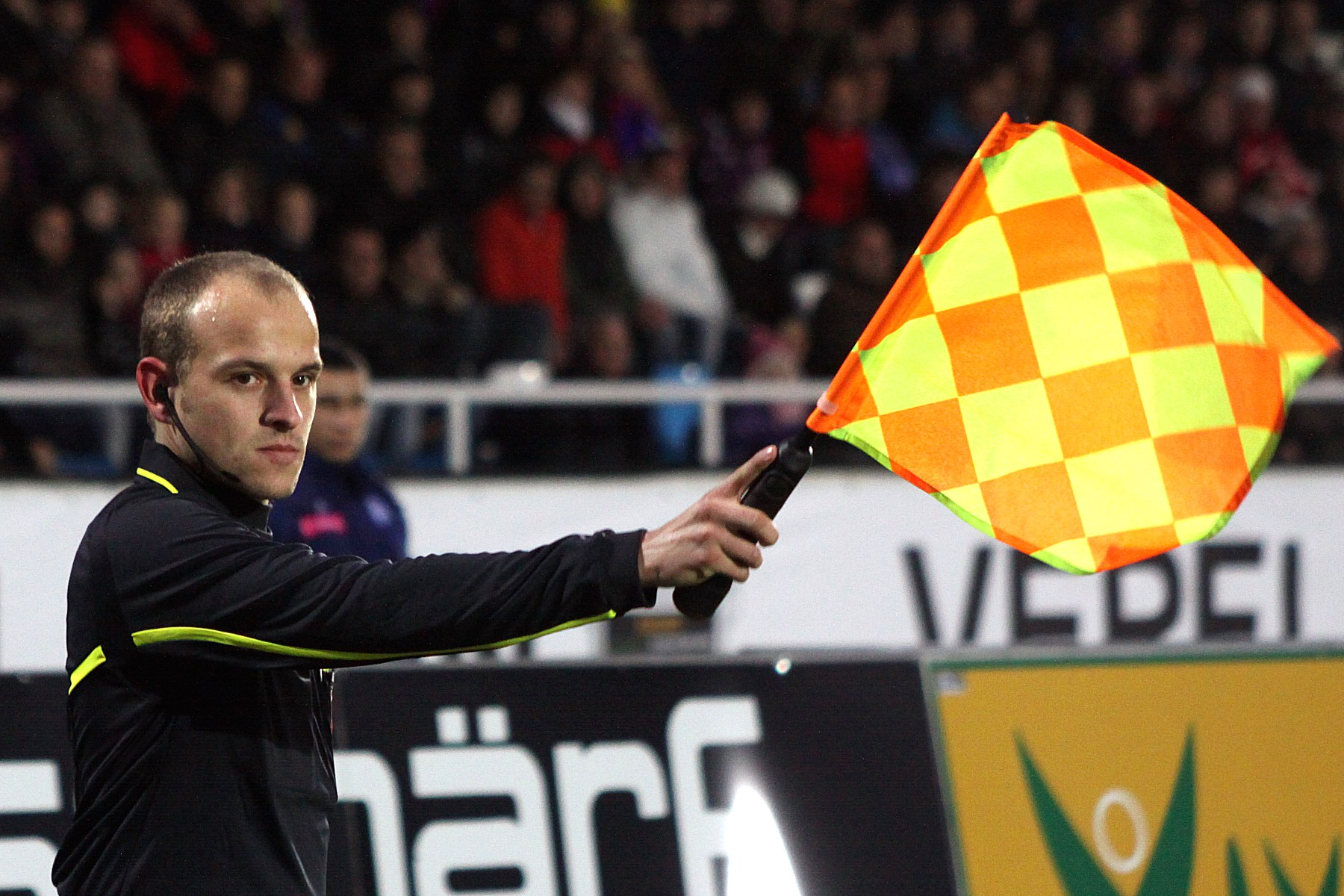
Assistant referee signalling that an offside offence has occurred

In association football, an assistant referee (also known as a linesman) is an official who assists the referee in administering the Laws of the Game during a match. Although assistants are not required under the laws, at most organised levels of football the match officiating crew consists of the referee and at least two assistant referees. The responsibilities of the various assistant referees are listed in Law 6, "The Other Match Officials". In the current laws the term "assistant referee" technically refers only to the two officials who generally patrol the touchlines, with the wider range of assistants to the referee given other titles.

The assistant referees' duties generally consist of judging when the ball has left the field of play – including which team is entitled to return the ball to play, judging when an offside offence has occurred, and advising the referee when an infringement of the laws has occurred out of their view. These two officials are typically positioned on opposite touchlines, and each stay beside different halves of the pitch.

At higher levels of play the referee is also assisted by a fourth official. The fourth official's duties are usually administrative in nature, such as supervising the substitution procedures. The fourth official will generally spend the game in the vicinity of the teams' technical areas.

Competition rules will mandate procedures for replacing officials who are unable to continue. Often, the fourth official will replace the referee or one of the assistant referees if they are unable to continue. The laws also allow for designated reserve assistant referees who have no other responsibilities unless called upon to replace a member of the officiating team who is unable to continue.

At very high-level games there may be further assistant referees. Additional assistant referees are positioned to observe incidents near the two goals. Video assistant referees view footage of the game and can advise the referee to review decisions that may have been incorrect.

The referee is the sole arbiter of the laws during the match. Assistants' calls and judgements are considered to be advisory and can be overruled by the referee.

== General duties ==
As outlined in Law 6 of the Laws of the Game, the officiating team works together to enforce the Laws during a game, though the referee remains the final decision maker in all matters. The assistant referees (including additional assistant referees if present) and the fourth official are expected to advise the referee if they have a clearer view of any particular incident. At the highest levels of play, particularly in matches held in large stadiums, the entire officiating crew may be equipped with wireless microphones and earpieces to facilitate vocal communication across long distances or through loud stadium noise.

A team of assistants allows for the replacement of officials if one or more are unable to continue. The system of who replaces who is a matter for the organising competition.

All officials wear uniforms that match that of the referee, though the fourth official will often wear a tracksuit over the kit in colder weather.

== Roles ==
=== Assistant referee ===
The diagonal system of control. In this the two assistant referees (AR) stay on opposite touchlines in opposite halves.

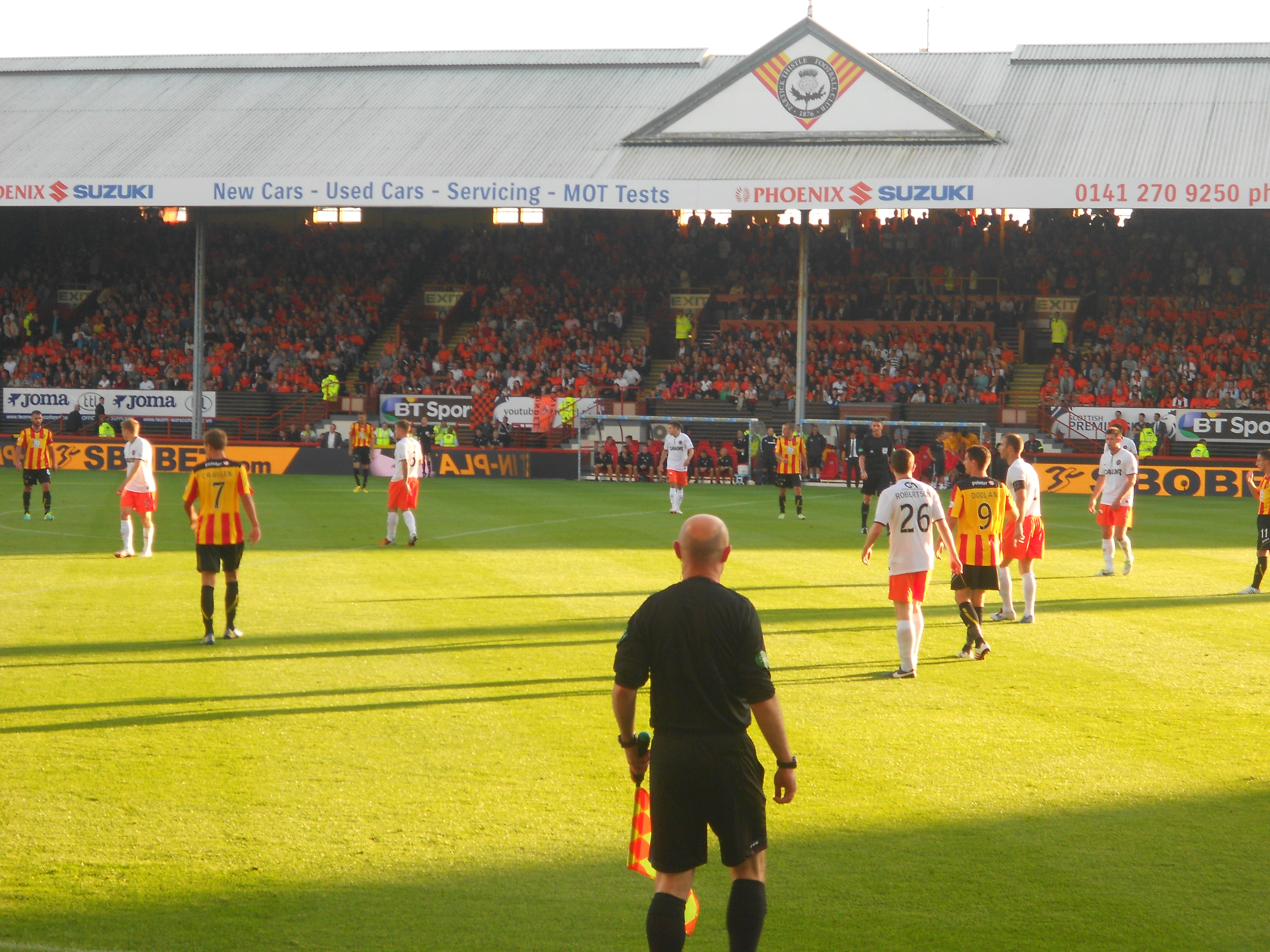
An assistant referee (front, in black) officiates a match between Partick Thistle and Dundee United

Law 6 of the Laws of the Game specifies that "two assistant referees may be appointed". The assistant referees move along the touchlines, each covering their own half of the field of play.

In general, assistant referees are responsible for assisting the referee with:

- whether the whole ball has passed outside the field of play
- which side is entitled to return the ball into the field of play
- offside offence decisions
- managing substitutions (where no fourth official is present)
- identifying offences or other infringements where the referee does not have an adequate view

All decisions by the assistant referees are only advisory to the referee; their decisions are not binding and the referee is allowed to overrule an assistant. An assistant referee may also be called upon by the referee to provide an opinion regarding matters which the referee requires clarification on. Occasionally the assistant referee will assist in player management during free kicks, as well as provide visual assistance during penalty kicks. The assistant referees also usually assist the referee with preparatory and administrative functions.

Assistant referees carry brightly coloured flags (usually red, yellow, or some pattern involving those colours) which are used to indicate their decisions to the referee, players, and spectators. During the game each assistant referee oversees one touch-line and one end of the field using the diagonal system of control. The more senior of the two assistants will normally occupy the side of the field containing the technical areas, to help oversee substitutions. At higher levels of play, the assistant referees' flags may be equipped with buttons that the assistant referee may press to send an audible signal to the referee to get the referee's attention.

Assistant referees were formerly called linesmen. In 1996, the name was changed, primarily to better reflect the modern role of these officials, and secondarily to become non-gender specific, though the term is still in widespread unofficial use. They are also sometimes incorrectly referred to as "referee's assistants".

=== Fourth official ===
The fourth official assists the referee in a variety of tasks, and may be called upon to replace another match official. The practice of having a named replacement referee was introduced in 1966 by English referee and administrator Ken Aston, but the International Football Association Board (IFAB) did not officially create the position until 1991, and listed only areas of responsibility. The fourth official is simply instructed to assist the referee at all times, and their duties are largely at the discretion of the referee.

The fourth official typically has a short distance from the touchline between the two teams' technical areas, however their positioning is not defined by the Laws of the Game.

In general, fourth officials are responsible for assisting the referee with:

- administrative functions before, during and after the match
- assessment of players' equipment;
- managing substitutions, including using a numbered board or electronic display where supplied
- notifying, by means of numbered boards or electronic displays where supplied, the time added on at the end of each half
- acting as the contact point between the match officiating crew and any outside agents (such as stadium managers, security personnel and ball retrievers)
- maintaining decorum in the teams' technical areas
- identifying offences or other infringements where the referee does not have an adequate view

In practice, the fourth official becomes a key member of the officiating team, who can watch the field and players and advise the referee on situations that are going on out of their sight. The fourth official keeps an extra set of records, and helps make sure the referee does not make a serious error such as cautioning the wrong player, or giving two cautions to the same player and forgetting to send off the player.

Where the fourth official is a junior member of the officiating team, they are generally expected to replace an assistant referee where they are unable to continue to perform their duties (either due to injury or replacing the main referee). However, in most high-level competitions, the fourth official is a designated referee (as opposed to assistant) and therefore replaces the referee in cases where they are unable to continue.

=== Additional assistant referee ===
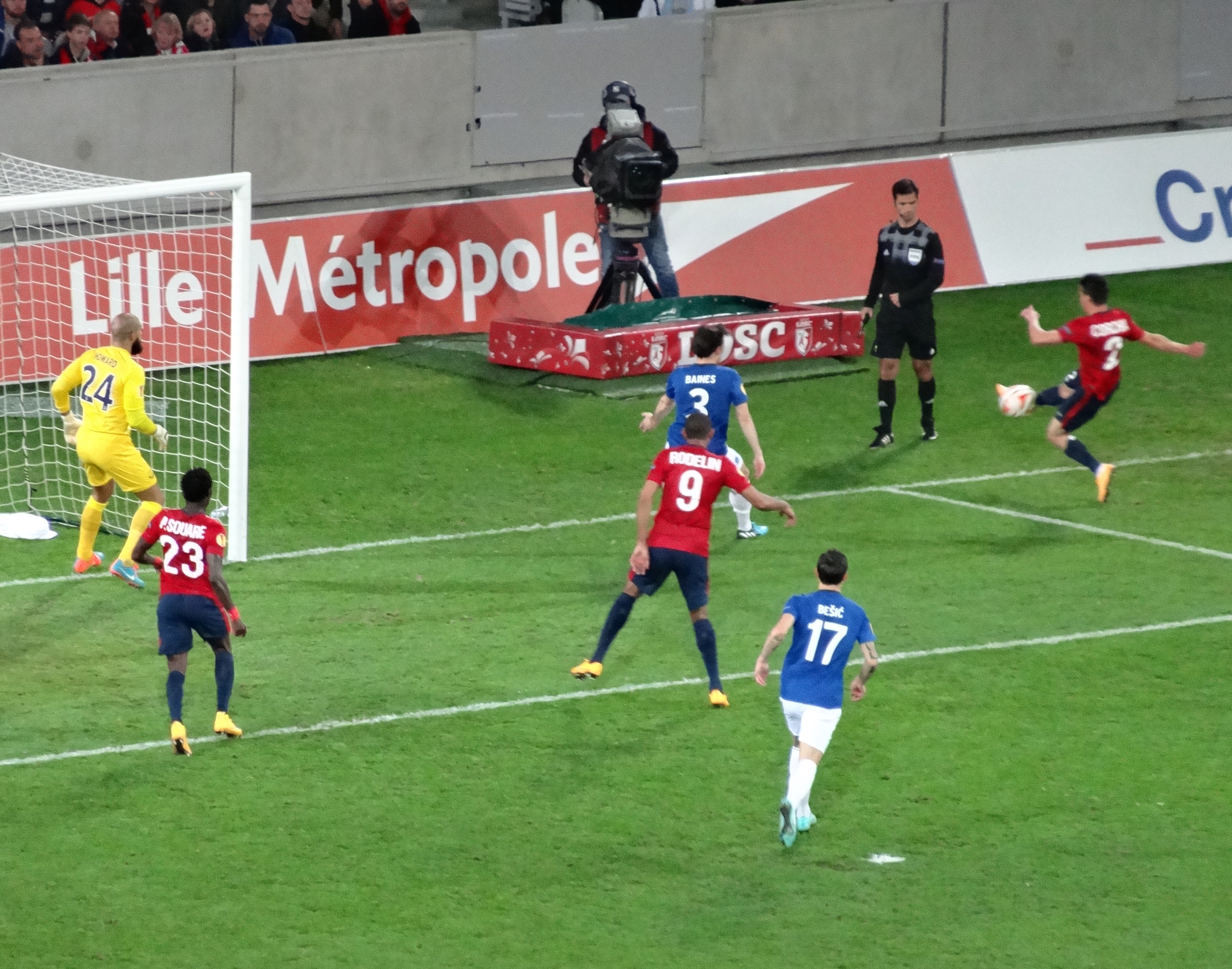
An additional referee for the goal line (in black)

The additional assistant referee (AAR) is an official that assists the referee behind the goal line to assist the referee in observing any incident that may occur near the penalty area. Recent trials, for example at the 2009–10 UEFA Europa League group stage, have been started to make place for an additional two assistant referees to be added to the game, positioned behind the goal lines, to "ensure that the Laws of the Game are upheld, informing the referee of incidents of any kind that they may otherwise have missed, particularly in key areas of the field like the penalty area and its surroundings," but only informing the referee of their observations through a wireless communication system. Their positioning also gives a good view to assist the referee in "ghost goal"-type incidents. The trial was evaluated by International Football Association Board (IFAB) technical experts.

This trial was later extended to the 2011–12 UEFA Champions League and qualifying games and the final tournament for the UEFA Euro 2012. Their reception has been mixed. Following a two-year experiment in the UEFA Champions League, Europa League and Euro 2012, as well as the AFC President's Cup and competitions in Brazil, France, Italy, Morocco and Qatar, the use of additional assistant referees was approved by the IFAB in July 2012. Additional assistant referees were used in the 2013 Scottish Cup final, the first time they had been used in a domestic match in Scottish football.

=== Video assistant referee ===
The video assistant referee (VAR) is an official, who will also have assistants themselves, that reviews decisions made with the use of video footage and a headset for communication with the on-field referee. Their use by competitions is optional.

=== Fifth official and reserve assistant referee ===
The fifth official was an official meant to serve as a replacement for either of the assistant referees in the unlikely event of an injury or incident that would prevent the assistant from continuing the game. For matches in the 2006 World Cup, FIFA assigned five officials. The role of the fifth official was to assist the fourth official in a variety of tasks, and potentially be called upon to replace another match official if necessary, for example in the case of injury. If an assistant referee could not carry on their duties, the fifth official was to be the primary replacement, whereas the fourth official was the referee's primary replacement. This distinction was made to reflect the fact that assistant referees and referees perform different tasks.

The fifth official had access to television coverage of the match, but was not permitted to advise the on-field referees of any incidents they had missed. Speaking after the 2006 FIFA World Cup final, Italy coach Marcello Lippi claimed that the referee had sent off France player Zinedine Zidane after receiving advice from "the fourth and fifth officials looking at the video at the edge of the pitch". These claims were subsequently denied by FIFA.

In the current Laws of the Game the role of the fifth official has been reduced to that of the reserve assistant referee (RAR, also known as the reserve official). They have no duties other than to replace an assistant referee or fourth official who is unable to continue. From July 2023 the RAR was able to replace an additional assistant referee and assist the referee as per other match officials.

== See also ==
- Referee (association football)
