= Dod Brewster =

Scottish footballer

Personal information
- Full name: George Brewster
- Date of birth: 7 October 1891
- Place of birth: Logie Buchan, Aberdeenshire, Scotland
- Date of death: 18 November 1964 (aged 73)
- Place of death: Wigan, England
- Height: 6 ft 0 in (1.83 m)
- Position: Centre half

Youth career
- Mugiemoss

Senior career*
| Years | Team | Apps | (Gls) |
| 1913–1920 | Aberdeen | 119 | (9) |
| 1920–1922 | Everton | 64 | (4) |
| 1922–1923 | Wolverhampton Wanderers | 11 | (0) |
- Lovells Athletic

International career
| 1921 | Scotland | 1 | (0) |
- * Club domestic league appearances and goals

George "Dod" Brewster MM (7 October 1891 – 18 November 1964) was a Scottish former professional football centre-half who played for Aberdeen, Everton, and Wolverhampton Wanderers.

== Club career ==
=== Aberdeen ===
Brewster made his Aberdeen debut in a game against Celtic in 1913. After playing over 100 games for Aberdeen, he moved to Everton in 1920.

=== Everton ===
After signing for Everton for what was said to be a 'record fee', Brewster made 68 appearances for the club before joining Wolverhampton Wanderers.

=== Wolverhampton Wanderers ===
Brewster joined Wolves in 1922 and left after just 13 games.

=== Later career ===
Brewster went on to play for Lovells Athletic in Wales, Wallasey Athletic, Brooklyn Athletic in New York (March–June 1924), and had a spell as player/manager at Caledonian.

== International career ==
Brewster was capped once for Scotland on 9 April 1921 against England.

== Military career ==
Sapper George Brewster served with the Royal Engineers in World War One, and was awarded the Military Medal in 1918.

== Career statistics ==
=== Club ===
Appearances and goals by club, season and competition
| Club | Season | League | | | National Cup | | Total | |
| Club | Season | Division | Apps | Goals | Apps | Goals | Apps | Goals |
|---|---|---|---|---|---|---|---|---|
| Aberdeen | 1912–13 | Scottish Division One | 7 | 0 | 0 | 0 | 7 | 0 |
| Aberdeen | 1913–14 | Scottish Division One | 11 | 0 | 0 | 0 | 11 | 0 |
| Aberdeen | 1914–15 | Scottish Division One | 25 | 2 | - | - | 25 | 2 |
| Aberdeen | 1915–16 | Scottish Division One | 34 | 3 | - | - | 34 | 3 |
| Aberdeen | 1916–17 | Scottish Division One | 20 | 1 | - | - | 20 | 1 |
| Aberdeen | 1917–18 | Aberdeen dropped out of competitive football due to the First World War | | | | | | |
| Aberdeen | 1918–19 | Aberdeen dropped out of competitive football due to the First World War | | | | | | |
| Aberdeen | 1919–20 | Scottish Division One | 22 | 3 | 0 | 0 | 23 | 3 |
| Aberdeen | Total | | 119 | 9 | 0 | 0 | 119 | 9 |
| Everton | 1919–20 | First Division | 5 | 0 | 0 | 0 | 5 | 0 |
| Everton | 1920–21 | First Division | 29 | 0 | 4 | 1 | 33 | 1 |
| Everton | 1921–22 | First Division | 25 | 3 | 0 | 0 | 25 | 3 |
| Everton | 1922–23 | First Division | 5 | 1 | 0 | 0 | 5 | 1 |
| Everton | Total | | 64 | 4 | 4 | 1 | 68 | 5 |
| Wolverhampton Wanderers | 1922–23 | Second Division | 11 | 0 | 2 | 0 | 13 | 0 |
| Career total | | | 194 | 13 | 6 | 1 | 200 | 14 |

=== International ===
Appearances and goals by national team and year
| National team | Year | Apps | Goals |
|---|---|---|---|
| Scotland | 1921 | 1 | 0 |
| Total | | 1 | 0 |
