= Andy Greig =

Scottish footballer

Personal information
- Full name: Andrew John Smith Greig
- Date of birth: 19 October 1893
- Place of birth: Aberdeen, Scotland
- Height: 5 ft 10 in (1.78 m)
- Position: Goalkeeper

Senior career*
Years	Team	Apps	(Gls)
19??–1910	Mugiemoss		
1910–1917	Aberdeen	80	(0)
1917	→ Raith Rovers (loan)		
1918–1924	Darlington	95	(0)
1924–192?	Shildon		
192?–1926	Peterhead		
1926–19??	Montrose		
- * Club domestic league appearances and goals

Andrew John Smith Greig (19 October 1893 – after 1925) was a Scottish footballer who played as a goalkeeper in the Scottish Football League for Aberdeen and in the Football League for Darlington either side of the First World War. He also played for Mugiemoss, Raith Rovers (on loan), Shildon, Peterhead and Montrose. He was deaf.

== Life and career ==
Greig was born in Aberdeen, and played Junior football with Mugiemoss before beginning his senior career with Aberdeen F.C. After playing for the reserve team during the 1910–11 season, he made his first-team debut on 25 September 1911, keeping a clean sheet as Aberdeen beat Queen's Park 3–0. The Scotsman reported that "Greig appeared in goal for the home team, and got an encouraging reception, which ultimate events proved to be well deserved." He played 22 times in the 1911–12 Scottish Division One season, fewer in the next, before returning to first-team duties on a regular basis in 1913–14. He remained with the club, appearing infrequently, until the end of the 1916–17 season, when Aberdeen withdrew from the league because of the First World War. He finished his Aberdeen career with 80 appearances in league competition and 7 in the Scottish Cup. He played on loan to Raith Rovers during the war.

Greig was one of numerous players recruited by English club Darlington Forge Albion, which was established to represent the town of Darlington in the 1919 Northern Victory League after Darlington F.C. had folded during the war. He was ever-present in that competition, and remained with the club as they adopted the Darlington F.C. name and its place in the North Eastern League. He played in the defeat of First Division club Sheffield Wednesday in the 1919–20 FA Cup, in front of 52,388 spectators at Hillsborough – the Daily Express reported that Greig was "tested with all manner of shots, but always emerged triumphant", and that he and his full-backs were "as sound a defence as one could wish for". He contributed to the team's North Eastern League title the following year, which confirmed the club's invitation to join the new Football League Third Division North. He made his debut in the Football League on 5 November 1921 in a 3–0 defeat of Barrow, and retained his place, keeping John Ward out of the team, until April 1922 when he broke his arm during a match. He regained his regular starting place for the next two seasons, taking his appearance totals to 95 Football League matches and 20 in the FA Cup, but the club's financial problems meant they had to let players leave, and Greig spent time with Shildon before returning to Scotland where he played for Peterhead and Montrose.

== Career statistics ==
Appearances and goals by club, season and competition
Club	Season	League			National cup (Note: Includes Scottish Cup, FA Cup. Although the Scottish League continued during the First World War, the Scottish Cup did not.)		Total	
Club	Season	Division	Apps	Goals	Apps	Goals	Apps	Goals
Aberdeen	1911–12	Scottish Division One	22	0	5	0	27	0
Aberdeen	1912–13	Scottish Division One	10	0	0	0	10	0
Aberdeen	1913–14	Scottish Division One	32	0	2	0	34	0
Aberdeen	1914–15	Scottish Division One	9	0	—		9	0
Aberdeen	1915–16	Scottish Division One	5	0	—		5	0
Aberdeen	1916–17	Scottish Division One	2	0	—		2	0
Aberdeen	Total		80	0	7	0	87	0
Darlington (Note: Source does not include appearance data for Darlington's time in the North-Eastern League.)	1919–20	North-Eastern League			7	0	7	0
Darlington	1920–21	North-Eastern League			3	0	3	0
Darlington	1921–22	Football League Third Division North	20	0	4	0	24	0
Darlington	1922–23	Football League Third Division North	36	0	2	0	38	0
Darlington	1923–24	Football League Third Division North	39	0	4	0	43	0
Darlington	Total		95	0	20	0	115	0
Career total			175	0	27	0	202	0
