= George Wilson (footballer, born 1887) =

Scottish footballer

Personal information
- Date of birth: 7 April 1887
- Place of birth: Invergordon, Scotland
- Date of death: 10 January 1970 (aged 82)
- Place of death: Nairn, Scotland
- Height: 5 ft 8 in (1.73 m)
- Position: Half back

Senior career*
Years	Team	Apps	(Gls)
1907–1914	Aberdeen	181	(14)
- * Club domestic league appearances and goals

George Wilson (7 April 1887 – 10 January 1970) was a Scottish footballer who played mainly as a half back (capable of playing on either flank, or in the centre). His only club at the professional level was Aberdeen where he spent eight years, having moved to the city as a teenager to study at its main university; he initially joined the Dons as a centre forward. He was forced to retire after sustaining a serious injury to his kneecap in January 1914.

== Career statistics ==
Appearances and goals by club, season and competition
Club	Season	League			Scottish Cup		Total	
Club	Season	Division	Apps	Goals	Apps	Goals	Apps	Goals
Aberdeen	1906-07	Scottish Division One	11	6	0	0	11	6
Aberdeen	1907–08	Scottish Division One	7	0	0	0	7	0
Aberdeen	1908–09	Scottish Division One	17	2	2	1	19	3
Aberdeen	1909–10	Scottish Division One	29	1	3	1	32	2
Aberdeen	1910–11	Scottish Division One	32	0	2	0	34	0
Aberdeen	1911–12	Scottish Division One	29	0	5	0	34	0
Aberdeen	1912–13	Scottish Division One	31	5	1	0	32	5
Aberdeen	1913–14	Scottish Division One	25	0	0	0	25	0
Aberdeen	Total		181	14	13	2	194	16
