= Arthur Murray (footballer) =

Scottish footballer

Personal information
- Full name: Arthur Farquhar Murray
- Date of birth: 23 July 1880
- Place of birth: Aberdeen, Scotland
- Date of death: 27 July 1930 (aged 50)
- Place of death: Inverness, Scotland
- Position: Centre half

Senior career*
Years	Team	Apps	(Gls)
- Victoria United
1903–1905	Arbroath	36	(0)
- Forfar Athletic
1906–1913	Queen's Park	131	(6)
- * Club domestic league appearances and goals

Arthur Farquhar Murray (23 July 1880 – 27 July 1930) was a Scottish amateur footballer who played as a centre half in the Scottish League for Queen's Park. He was a member of the club's committee and served as club president between 1921 and 1923.

== Personal life ==
Murray's younger brother Herbert was also a footballer. He studied Classics at Aberdeen University and later taught at Allan Glen's School in Glasgow. In June 1916, in the middle of the First World War, Murray enlisted as a private in the Argyll and Sutherland Highlanders. He was commissioned into the Gordon Highlanders as a lieutenant in January 1917 and was captured by the Germans during the German spring offensive in March 1918. Murray was released at the end of the war and was discharged from the army in January 1919. He took up the post of rector of Banff Academy in 1924.

== Honours ==
Forfar Athletic

- Forfarshire Cup: 1905–06

Arbroath

- Scottish Qualifying Cup: 1902–03
