= Herbert Murray (footballer) =

Scottish footballer

Personal information
- Full name: Herbert Murray
- Date of birth: 11 December 1885
- Place of birth: Newhills, Scotland
- Date of death: 20 July 1918 (aged 32)
- Place of death: near Epernay, France
- Position: Forward

Senior career*
Years	Team	Apps	(Gls)
1904–1905	Arbroath	12	(3)
1905–1906	East Stirlingshire	0	(0)
1906–1908	Clyde	47	(5)
1908–1910	Aberdeen	31	(1)
1910–1911	Queen's Park	11	(0)
1911	Motherwell	1	(0)
1911–1912	St Johnstone	15	(1)
1912–1914	Aberdeen	7	(2)
- * Club domestic league appearances and goals

Herbert Murray MC (11 December 1885 – 20 July 1918) was a Scottish professional footballer who played as a forward in the Scottish League for a number of clubs, principally Aberdeen.

== Personal life ==
Murray's brother Arthur was also a footballer. Murray attended Robert Gordon's College, Aberdeen University and taught at Robert Gordon Technical College. In early 1915, with the First World War underway, Murray enlisted in the Gordon Highlanders and received a commission on 9 August 1915. He was severely wounded on the Western Front in mid-1915 and sent back to Britain, where he served as a musketry instructor. He returned to the front in April 1917 and was awarded the Military Cross for bravery in the field during the German spring offensive in March 1918. Murray was serving with the rank of captain when he was killed in the Bois de Courton, near Épernay, on 20 July 1918, during the Second Battle of the Marne. He was buried in Marfaux British Cemetery.

== Career statistics ==
Appearances and goals by club, season and competition
Club	Season	League			Scottish Cup		Other		Total	
Club	Season	Division	Apps	Goals	Apps	Goals	Apps	Goals	Apps	Goals
Arbroath	1904–05	Northern League	12	3	—		—		12	3
East Stirlingshire	1905–06	Scottish Second Division	0	0	3	0	—		3	0
Clyde	1906–07	Scottish First Division	25	3	3	1	—		28	4
Clyde	1907–08	Scottish First Division	22	2	2	0	—		24	2
Clyde	Total		47	5	5	1	—		52	6
Aberdeen	1908–09	Scottish First Division	8	2	1	0	1 (Note: Appearance in North East Cup)	0	10	2
Aberdeen	1909–10	Scottish First Division	31	0	3	1	2 (Note: Appearances in Fleming Charity Shield)	0	36	1
Aberdeen	Total		39	2	4	1	3	0	46	3
Queen's Park	1910–11	Scottish First Division	11	0	0	0	1 (Note: Appearance in Glasgow Cup)	0	12	0
Motherwell	1911–12	Scottish First Division	1	0	—		—		1	0
St Johnstone	1911–12	Scottish Second Division	15	1	2	0	—		17	1
St Johnstone	1912–13	Scottish Second Division	0	0	1	0	—		1	0
St Johnstone	Total		15	1	3	0	—		18	1
Aberdeen	1912–13	Scottish First Division	5	2	—		—		5	2
Aberdeen	1913–14	Scottish First Division	2	0	0	0	—		2	0
Aberdeen	Total		46	2	4	1	3	0	53	3
Career total			132	11	15	2	4	0	151	13

== Honours ==
Aberdeen

- Fleming Charity Cup: 1909–10
