= Technical area =

Area in association football

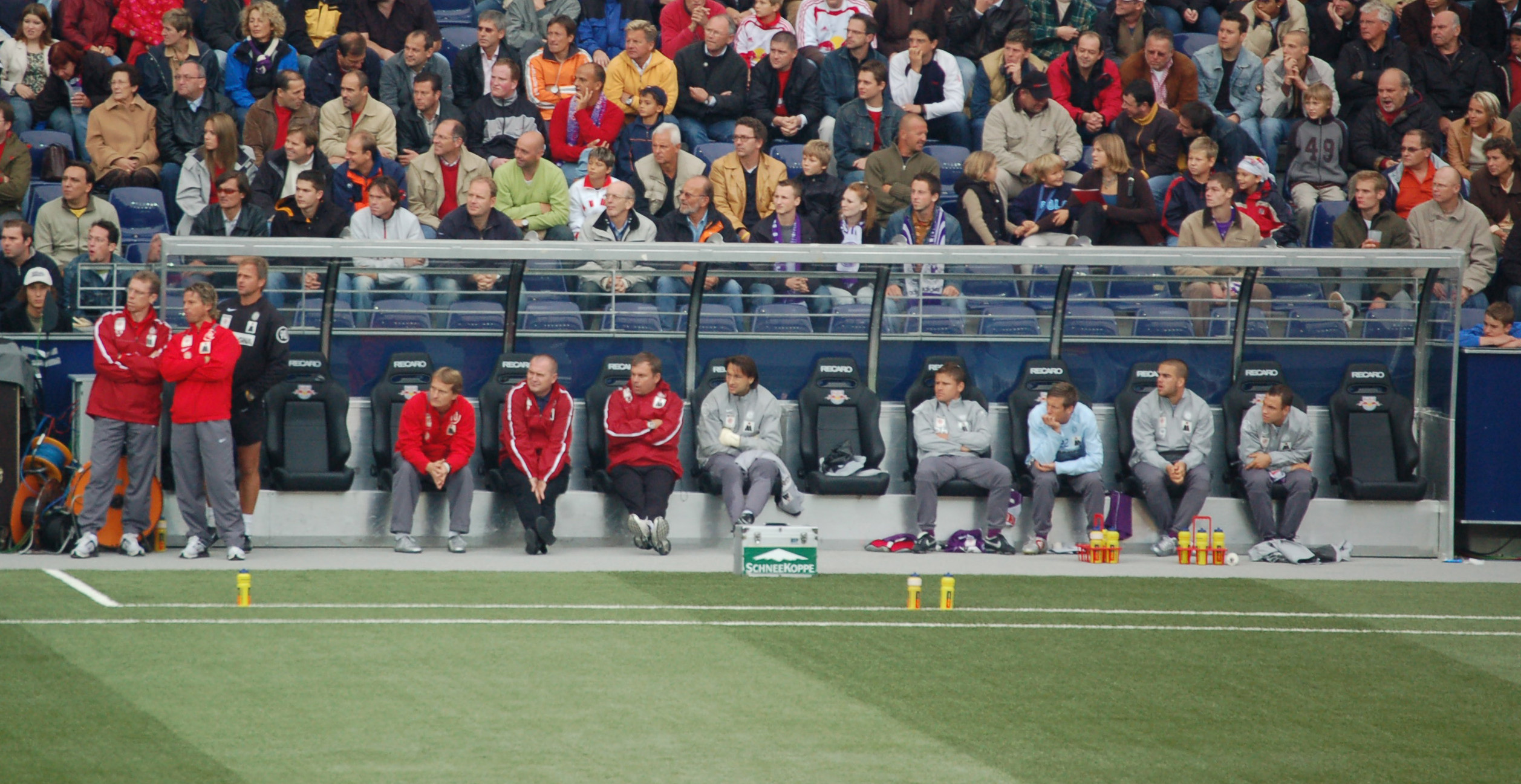
Austria Vienna's bench and technical area during a match in 2005

The technical area in association football is the area at the side of the pitch which the teams' managers, other coaching personnel, and substitutes are allowed to occupy during a match.

The technical area usually includes a seated area referred to as the "dugout" or "bench" as well as a marked zone in front of it and adjacent to the pitch.

== History ==
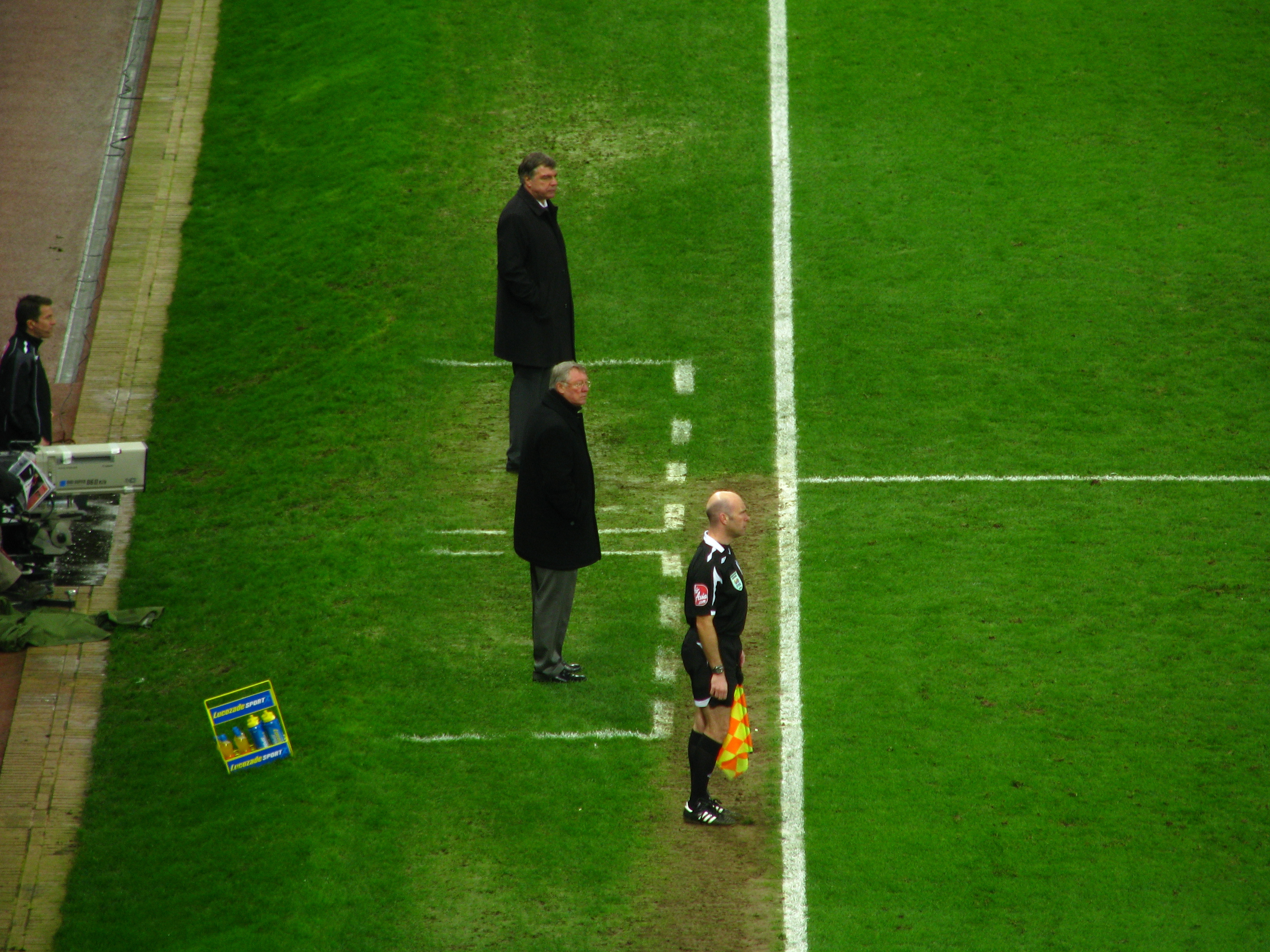
White lines define the limits of each team's technical area at Manchester United's Old Trafford in 2009.

The first football stadium to feature a dugout was Pittodrie Stadium, home of Aberdeen, where dugouts were introduced by trainer Donald Colman in the 1920s. He wanted a place to take notes and observe his players (especially their feet, hence the reason for being set partially below pitch level) without sacrificing the shelter provided by a grandstand.

The defined space of the technical area was established in the notes section of the Laws of the Game in 1993.

== Operation ==
The technical area is marked by a white line, varying in size but always "1m (1yd) on either side of the designated seated area and extend[ing] forward up to a distance of 1m (1yd) from the touch line", according to the Laws of the Game.

Managers may not cross the line during play, which restricts them from approaching the pitch. In 1999, FIFA put the fourth official in charge of enforcing this rule, although substitutes may warm up along the side of the pitch.
