= John Wyllie (footballer) =

Scottish footballer (1884–1940)

Personal information
- Full name: John Stewart Wyllie
- Date of birth: 1884
- Place of birth: Riccarton, Scotland
- Date of death: 1940 (aged 55–56)
- Place of death: Aberdeen, Scotland
- Height: 5 ft 10 in (1.78 m)
- Position: Centre half

Senior career*
Years	Team	Apps	(Gls)
- Kilmarnock Deanpark
1901–1909	Kilmarnock	46	(5)
1905	→ Rangers (loan)	0	(0)
1905–1906	→ Maxwelltown Volunteers (loan)		
1906–1908	→ Ayr Parkhouse (loan)		
1908	Ayr		
1908–1909	Hurlford		
1909–1910	Clyde	13	(3)
1910–1912	Aberdeen	64	(6)
1912–1913	Bradford City	24	(0)
1913–1920	Aberdeen	105	(20)
1918–1919	→ Fraserburgh (loan)		
1920–1921	Fraserburgh		
1921–1922	St Johnstone	28	(1)
1922	Forfar Athletic	23	(2)
Total		303	(37)
- * Club domestic league appearances and goals

John Stewart Wyllie (1884–1940) was a Scottish professional footballer who played as a centre half.

== Career ==
Born in Riccarton, Wyllie spent his early career with Kilmarnock Deanpark, Kilmarnock, Rangers, Maxwelltown Volunteers, Ayr Parkhouse, Ayr, Hurlford, Clyde and Aberdeen. He signed for Bradford City from Aberdeen in May 1912. He made 24 league appearances for the club, before returning to Aberdeen in September 1913. He later played for Fraserburgh, St Johnstone and Forfar Athletic, and later coached in Norway.

== Career statistics ==
Appearances and goals by club, season and competition
Club	Season	League			Cup		Total	
Club	Season	Division	Apps	Goals	Apps	Goals	Apps	Goals
Kilmarnock	1901–02	Scottish Division One	12	2	0	0	12	2
Kilmarnock	1902–03	Scottish Division One	11	1	2	0	13	1
Kilmarnock	1903–04	Scottish Division One	21	1	6	0	27	1
Kilmarnock	1904–05	Scottish Division One	2	2	0	0	2	2
Kilmarnock	Total		46	6	8	0	54	6
Clyde	1909–10	Scottish Division One	13	3	–	–	13+	3+
Aberdeen	1910–11	Scottish Division One	30	2	3	0	33	2
Aberdeen	1911–12	Scottish Division One	34	4	5	2	39	6
Aberdeen	Total		64	6	8	2	72	8
Bradford City	1912–13	First Division	24	0	0	0	24	0
Aberdeen	1913–14	Scottish Division One	32	8	2	0	34	8
Aberdeen	1914–15	Scottish Division One	34	4	–	–	34	4
Aberdeen	1915–16	Scottish Division One	20	3	–	–	20	3
Aberdeen	1916–17	Scottish Division One	12	4	–	–	12	4
Aberdeen	1917–18	Aberdeen withdrew from competitive football due to the First World War						
Aberdeen	1918–19	Aberdeen withdrew from competitive football due to the First World War						
Aberdeen	1919–20	Scottish Division One	7	1	3	0	10	1
Aberdeen	Total		105	20	5	0	110	20
St Johnstone	1921–22	Scottish Division Two	28	1	–	–	28+	1+
Forfar Athletic	1922–23	Scottish Division Two	23	2	1	0	24	2
Career total			303	38	22+	2+	325+	40+

== Sources ==
- Frost, Terry (1988). Bradford City A Complete Record 1903–1988. Breedon Books Sport. ISBN 0-907969-38-0.
