= 1910–11 in Scottish football =

Football in Scotland
- Season: 1910–11

1910–11 in Scottish football

Division One champions
- Rangers

Division Two champions
- Dumbarton

Scottish Cup winners
- Celtic

Junior Cup winners
- Burnbank Athletic

Scotland national team
- 1911 BHC

The 1910–11 season was the 38th season of competitive football in Scotland and the 21st season of the Scottish Football League.

== League competitions ==
=== Scottish League Division One ===
Pos	Team	Pld	W	D	L	GF	GA	GD	Pts
1	Rangers (C)	34	23	6	5	90	34	+56	52
2	Aberdeen	34	19	10	5	53	28	+25	48
3	Falkirk	34	17	10	7	65	42	+23	44
4	Partick Thistle	34	17	8	9	50	41	+9	42
5	Celtic	34	15	11	8	48	18	+30	41
6	Dundee	34	18	5	11	54	42	+12	41
7	Third Lanark	34	16	7	11	59	53	+6	39
8	Clyde	34	14	11	9	45	36	+9	39
9	Hibernian	34	15	6	13	44	48	−4	36
10	Kilmarnock	34	12	10	12	42	45	−3	34
11	Airdrieonians	34	12	9	13	49	53	−4	33
12	St Mirren	34	12	7	15	46	57	−11	31
13	Morton	34	9	11	14	49	51	−2	29
14	Heart of Midlothian	34	8	8	18	42	59	−17	24
15	Raith Rovers	34	7	10	17	36	55	−19	24
16	Hamilton Academical	34	8	5	21	31	60	−29	21
17	Motherwell	34	8	4	22	37	66	−29	20
18	Queen's Park	34	5	4	25	28	80	−52	14

Rules for classification: Teams finish equal if level on points. Points system: 2 points for a win, 1 point for a draw, 0 points for a loss
(C) Champions

Champions: Rangers

=== Scottish League Division Two ===
This season Ayr and Ayr Parkhouse have merged to form Ayr United. The vacant place in Division Two was filled by Dundee Hibernian.

Pos	Team	Pld	W	D	L	GF	GA	GD	Pts	Qualification
1	Dumbarton (C)	22	15	1	6	52	30	+22	31	
2	Ayr United	22	12	3	7	54	36	+18	27	
3	Albion Rovers	22	10	5	7	26	21	+5	25	
4	Leith Athletic	22	9	6	7	42	43	−1	24	
5	Cowdenbeath	22	9	5	8	31	27	+4	23	
6	St Bernard's	22	10	2	10	36	41	−5	22	
7	East Stirlingshire	22	7	6	9	28	34	−6	20	
8	Abercorn	22	9	1	12	39	50	−11	19	
8	Arthurlie	22	7	5	10	26	33	−7	19	
8	Dundee Hibernian	22	7	5	10	29	36	−7	19	
8	Port Glasgow Athletic (R)	22	8	3	11	27	32	−5	19	Did not apply for re-election (Note: Port Glasgow Athletic did not apply for re-election to compete for the next season and were replaced by St Johnstone.)
12	Vale of Leven	22	4	8	10	21	28	−7	16	

Source: statto.com
Rules for classification: Teams finish equal if level on points. Points system: 2 points for a win, 1 point for a draw, 0 points for a loss
(C) Champions; (R) Relegated

== Other honours ==
=== Cup honours ===
==== National ====
Competition	Winner	Score	Runner-up
Scottish Cup	Celtic	2 – 0 (Note: Replay needed.)	Hamilton Academical
Scottish Qualifying Cup	East Stirlingshire	1 – 0	Johnstone
Scottish Consolation Cup	St Johnstone	2 – 1	Dumbarton
Scottish Junior Cup	Burnbank Athletic	1 – 0	Petershill
Scottish Amateur Cup	Civil Service Strollers	1 – 0	Queen's Park Strollers (Note: The Strollers were the second XI of Queen's Park.)

==== County ====
Competition	Winner	Score	Runner-up
Aberdeenshire Cup	Fraserburgh	2 – 0	Buckie Thistle
Ayrshire Cup	Hurlford	3 – 2	Ayr United
Dumbartonshire Cup	Vale of Leven	1 – 1	Dumbarton Harp
East of Scotland Shield	Hibernian	3 – 0	Leith Athletic
Fife Cup	Dunfermline Athletic	2 – 1	Raith Rovers
Forfarshire Cup	Dundee Hibs	1 – 0	Arbroath
Glasgow Cup	Rangers	3 – 1	Celtic
Lanarkshire Cup	Airdrie	5 – 0	Dykehead
Linlithgowshire Cup	Bathgate	2 – 1	Bo'ness
Perthshire Cup	St Johnstone	7 – 0	Morrisonians
Renfrewshire Cup	St Mirren	4 – 2 (Note: Aggregate over two legs.)	Johnstone
Southern Counties Cup	Nithsdale Wanderers	3 – 2	Dumfries
Stirlingshire Cup	King's Park	1 – 0	Alloa

=== Non-league honours ===
Highland League

Top Three
Pos	Team	Pld	W	D	L	GF	GA	GD	Pts
1	Inverness Caledonian	14	8	5	1	38	15	+23	21
2	Buckie Thistle	14	10	0	4	32	19	+13	20
3	Inverness Citadel	14	6	5	3	28	18	+10	17

Source: RSSSF

Other Senior Leagues

Division	Winner
Banffshire League	unfinished
Border Senior League	Vale of Leithen (Division 1)
Border Senior League	Athletic (Division 2)
Central League	Dunfermline Athletic
Midland League	Hearts of Oak
Northern League	Aberdeen 'A'
Perthshire League	Crieff Morrisonians
Scottish Combination	unfinished
Scottish Union	unfinished

== Scotland national team ==
Date	Venue	Opponents	Score	Competition	Scotland scorer(s)
6 March 1911	Ninian Park, Cardiff (A)	Wales	2–2	BHC	Robert Hamilton (2)
18 March 1911	Celtic Park, Glasgow (H)	Ireland	2–0	BHC	Willie Reid, Jimmy McMenemy
1 April 1911	Goodison Park, Liverpool (A)	England	1–1	BHC	Sandy Higgins

Key:

- (H) = Home match
- (A) = Away match
- BHC = British Home Championship

Team	Pld	W	D	L	GF	GA	GD	Pts
England (C)	3	2	1	0	6	2	+4	5
Scotland	3	1	2	0	5	3	+2	4
Wales	3	1	1	1	4	6	−2	3
Ireland	3	0	0	3	2	6	−4	0

Rules for classification: 1) points. The points system worked as follows: 2 points for a win and 1 point for a draw.
(C) Champions

== Other national teams ==
=== Scottish League XI ===
Date	Venue	Opponents	Score (Note: Scottish League XI's score is shown first.)	Scotland scorer(s)
24 October 1910	London (A)	(England) Southern League XI	0–1	
31 October 1910	Belfast (A)	(Northern Ireland) Irish League XI	3–1	
4 March 1911	Ibrox Park, Glasgow (H)	(England) Football League XI	1–1	

== See also ==
- 1910–11 Aberdeen F.C. season
