= Jock Munro =

Scottish footballer

Personal information
- Full name: John Munro
- Date of birth: 14 April 1893
- Place of birth: Tarbat, Scotland
- Date of death: 8 May 1917 (aged 24)
- Place of death: Pas-de-Calais, France
- Position: Full back

Senior career*
Years	Team	Apps	(Gls)
–1913	Aberdeen East End		
1913–1915	Aberdeen	14	(0)
- * Club domestic league appearances and goals

John Munro (14 April 1893 – 8 May 1917) was a Scottish professional footballer who played as a full back in the Scottish League for Aberdeen.

== Personal life ==
Munro served as a gunner in the Royal Field Artillery during the First World War and was killed on the Western Front on 8 May 1917. He was buried in Anzin-Saint Aubin British Cemetery.

== Career statistics ==
Appearances and goals by club, season and competition
Club	Season	League			Scottish Cup		Total	
Club	Season	Division	Apps	Goals	Apps	Goals	Apps	Goals
Aberdeen	1914–15	Scottish First Division	13	0	—		13	0
Aberdeen	1915–16	Scottish First Division	1	0	—		1	0
Career total			14	0	0	0	14	0
