= Angus McIntosh (footballer) =

English footballer

Personal information
- Full name: Angus Munro McIntosh
- Date of birth: 1 July 1884
- Place of birth: Birkenhead, England
- Date of death: 1945 (aged 60–61)
- Place of death: Newcastle upon Tyne, England
- Position: Inside forward

Senior career*
Years	Team	Apps	(Gls)
1904–1905	Inverness Thistle		
1905–1908	Sunderland	40	(9)
1908–1910	Bury	36	(13)
1910–1914	Aberdeen	62	(22)
1914–19??	Buckie Thistle		
- * Club domestic league appearances and goals

Angus Munro McIntosh (1 July 1884 – 1945) was an English professional footballer who played as an inside forward for Sunderland, Bury and Aberdeen.
