= John Wood (footballer, born 1880) =

English footballer (1880–1916)

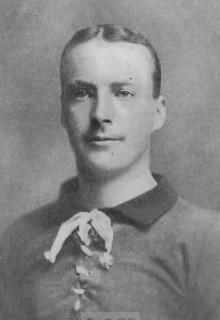

Personal information
- Date of birth: 1880
- Date of death: 1916
- Position: Striker

Senior career*
Years	Team	Apps	(Gls)
1905–1907	Derby County	37	(7)
1907–1909	Manchester City	26	(6)
1909–1910	Plymouth Argyle	25	(3)
1910–1911	Huddersfield Town	10	(0)
1911–1914	Aberdeen	55	(13)
- * Club domestic league appearances and goals

John Wood (1880–1916) was a professional footballer who played for Manchester City, Plymouth Argyle, Huddersfield Town and Aberdeen. He enlisted in the 1st Football Battalion of the Middlesex Regiment during the First World War and died during the Battle of the Somme.
