= Angus McLeod (footballer) =

Scottish footballer

Personal information
- Full name: Angus Cameron McLeod
- Date of birth: 11 January 1890
- Place of birth: Inverness, Scotland
- Date of death: 16 May 1917 (aged 27)
- Place of death: Pas-de-Calais, France
- Position: Forward

Senior career*
Years	Team	Apps	(Gls)
–1913	Caledonian		
1913–1916	Aberdeen	22	(6)
- * Club domestic league appearances and goals

Angus Cameron McLeod (11 January 1890 – 16 May 1917) was a Scottish professional footballer who played as a forward in the Scottish League for Aberdeen.

== Personal life ==
McLeod served in the Gordon Highlanders during the First World War and was holding the rank of acting lance corporal when he was killed in France on 16 May 1917. He is commemorated on the Arras Memorial.

== Career statistics ==
Appearances and goals by club, season and competition
Club	Season	League			National Cup		Total	
Club	Season	Division	Apps	Goals	Apps	Goals	Apps	Goals
Aberdeen	1913–14	Scottish First Division	12	5	0	0	12	5
Aberdeen	1914–15	Scottish First Division	6	1	—		6	1
Aberdeen	1915–16	Scottish First Division	4	0	—		4	0
Career total			22	6	0	0	22	6
