= Arthur King (footballer) =

Scottish footballer

Personal information
- Full name: Arthur King
- Date of birth: 6 August 1887
- Place of birth: Kintore, Scotland
- Position: Goalkeeper

Senior career*
Years	Team	Apps	(Gls)
1908–1913	Aberdeen	71	(0)
1913–1914	Tottenham Hotspur	19	(0)
- Belfast Celtic
1921–24	Dumbarton	60	
- * Club domestic league appearances and goals

Arthur King (6 August 1887–?) was a Scottish professional footballer who played for Aberdeen, Tottenham Hotspur, Belfast Celtic and Dumbarton.

== Football career ==
King joined Tottenham Hotspur in 1913 from Aberdeen. The goalkeeper played a total of 20 matches in all competitions for the Spurs between 1913 and 1914. After leaving White Hart Lane, King signed for Belfast Celtic before joining Dumbarton in December 1929 where he played in 62 matches in all competitions.
