= Willie Low =

English footballer

Personal information
- Full name: William Ross Low
- Date of birth: 21 September 1889
- Place of birth: Aberdeen, Scotland
- Date of death: 1970 (aged 80–81)
- Place of death: Redruth, England
- Position: Wing half

Senior career*
Years	Team	Apps	(Gls)
1908–1909	Aberdeen Shamrock		
1909–1914	Aberdeen	44	(0)
1914–1916	South Shields		
1916–1917	Aberdeen	1	(0)
1919	Grimsby Town	0	(0)
1920	Gainsborough Trinity		
1920–1922	Barnsley	42	(0)
1923–1924	Wombwell		
1924–1925	Truro City		
1925	Mabe		
Total		87	(0)
- * Club domestic league appearances and goals

William Ross Low (21 September 1889 – 1970) was a Scottish footballer who played in the Scottish Football League for Aberdeen, and in the English Football League for Barnsley.

His uncles Wilf and Harry and cousin Norman were all footballers.
