= Jimmy Philip =

Scottish football referee

Jimmy Philip (1863 – 12 October 1930) was the first coach of Scottish football club Aberdeen F.C. He was in charge of the club virtually from its foundation in 1903 until his retirement in 1924.

== Early life ==
Philip was the only son of four children. His father James Philip (born 1833) and mother Jane Philip (born 1830) were both Brass Founders. Their daughters Jane Philip (1861) Eliza Philip (1864) were both Envelope Makers and the youngest Isabella (1872) was a scholar. Philip married Mary Ann Forsyth (1864–1937) and had five children: James, Dot, Lily, Mary and George John (1905–1972).

Philip was a native Aberdonian, he had a wide range of sporting interests, and he had proposed to underwrite the first overseas tour by a Scottish international team. He was also a referee, although by profession he was a wood-turner.

== Aberdeen FC manager ==
Philip was appointed part-time manager for the first competitive game of the new club, a 1–1 draw with Stenhousemuir on 15 August 1903. In that first season, Aberdeen won the Aberdeenshire Cup, and subsequently made a bid to be elected to the Scottish Football League Division One. Philip was despatched to Glasgow to make the club's case, and returned with the promise of enough support. However, the final decision of the existing league members was to elect Aberdeen to the Second Division.

During that second season, the Qualifying Cup was won at Dens Park in Dundee, a 2–0 victory over Renton, former Scottish Cup holders. Progress in the league was not so straightforward, and the club ended the season in seventh place of twelve. However, a proposal by Celtic to expand Division One to 16 clubs meant that places were available for the 1905–06 season, and Aberdeen were duly elected.

Thereafter, progress was steady rather than spectacular, the club finishing in 12th position in the next two seasons, although there was a Scottish Cup semi-final in 1908, in which Celtic prevailed at Pittodrie. For the next few seasons, Aberdeen seem to have been genuine contenders for League honours, topping the table on more than one occasion, but never at season's end. In the 1910–11 season, both Rangers and Celtic were beaten at Pittodrie for the first time, and another Cup semi-final followed. That game, too, was lost to Celtic, but the strength of the side that season led to an invitation to a close season tour of Bohemia, Moravia, and Poland.

After the end of the 1911–12 season, Philip served as a referee at the Olympic Games in Stockholm.

In April 1920, Philip's position became full-time, in spite of the relative penury of the club at this time, but during wartime, the position reverted to part-time. The manager and players struggled on through the early years of the war, the team often made up of locally billeted servicemen, but by early 1917, the strain on finances, and the lack of public enthusiasm was too much, and the club withdrew from competition.

On the resumption of football in 1919, Philip was offered his old, full-time post at a salary of £350 per annum; a move which caused some controversy among the directors at the time. Philip accepted, and prepared to take the club forward into the new decade.

The early 1920s proved no more fruitful for Philip and his team than the prewar era, but one record was set which still stands as of 2020: Aberdeen's record victory of 13–0 over Peterhead in 1923. There were two further unsuccessful Cup semi-finals, in 1922 and 1924, but Philip's reign came to an end with no senior silverware to show for it.

== Final years ==
Philip retired as Aberdeen manager at the end of the 1923–24 season, becoming a director, and was also involved with the Clan MacGregor. His death was unexpected. He met the Aberdeen reserve team on their return from Paisley on the Saturday evening, and on returning home had a fatal seizure shortly after midnight, believed to be related to a road accident he had been involved in three months earlier while in Ireland. There was a very large attendance on the 16 October 1930 for the funeral of Philip. The cortege was over three-quarters of a mile in length, passed through streets lined with spectators. The burial was at Trinity Cemetery.

== Managerial statistics ==
Team	From	To	Record				
Team	From	To	G	W	D	L	Win %
Aberdeen	1903	1924	730	264	191	275	36.16
