= 1906–07 Aberdeen F.C. season =

Aberdeen F.C.
1906–07 season
- Chairman: Thomas Duncan
- Manager: Jimmy Philip
- Scottish Football League Division One: 11th
- Scottish Cup: 1st round
- Top goalscorer: League: Willie Lennie (9); All: Willie Lennie (9)
- Highest home attendance: 8,000 vs. Dundee, 8 December 1906; 8,000 vs. Celtic, 2 March 1907
- Lowest home attendance: 1,200 vs. Queen's Park, 24 September 1906

Aberdeen F.C. competed in the Scottish Football League Division One and the Scottish Cup in season 1906–07.

== Overview ==
This was Aberdeen's fourth season overall and second in the top flight. Aberdeen finished 11th out of 18 clubs in Division One, but were knocked out of the Scottish Cup by Renfrewshire club Johnstone after a replay. New signings included Irish international Charlie O'Hagan from Middlesbrough.

== Results ==
=== Scottish División One ===
Match Day	Date	Opponent	H/A	Score	Aberdeen Scorer(s)	Attendance
1	18 August	Hibernian	A	1–2	Lennie	6,000
2	25 August	Third Lanark	H	0–2		4,500
3	1 September	Rangers	A	2–6	H. Low, Lennie	10,000
4	8 September	St Mirren	H	4–2	Edgar, Haxton, Lennie (2)	5,500
5	15 September	Morton	A	1–2	H. Low	4,000
6	22 September	Airdrieonians	H	0–0		6,000
7	24 September	Queen's Park	H	2–1	Edgar, Lennie	1,200
8	29 September	Motherwell	A	2–3	Ward (2)	4,000
9	6 October	Falkirk	H	0–0		5,000
10	13 October	Celtic	A	1–2	McKinlay	14,000
11	20 October	Partick Thistle	H	0–0		4,000
12	27 October	Kilmarnock	A	3–1	McKinlay, H. Low (2)	1,500
13	3 November	Heart of Midlothian	H	2–3	McKinlay (2)	6,500
14	10 November	Dundee	A	0–0		12,000
15	17 November	Clyde	A	3–1	Ward, McKinlay, McDonald	3,000
16	24 November	Port Glasgow Athletic	H	1–0	Ward	4,000
17	1 December	Hamilton Academical	A	2–4	Lennie, Own goal	2,500
18	8 December	Dundee	H	0–3		8,000
19	22 December	Rangers	H	0–3		7,000
20	1 January	Falkirk	A	2–3	McDonald, Ward	4,000
21	12 January	Port Glasgow Athletic	A	2–2	H. Low, O'Hagan	5,000
22	19 January	Kilmarnock	H	3–0	H. Low (2), Lennie	4,000
23	16 February	Hamilton Academical	H	2–1	McDonald, Ward	3,000
24	23 February	Motherwell	H	2–2	H. Low, Wilson	3,500
25	2 March	Celtic	H	2–2	O'Hagan, Lennie	8,000
26	9 March	Morton	H	2–0	Simpson, Wilson	4,500
27	16 March	St Mirren	A	2–2	Simpson (2)	4,000
28	23 March	Airdrieonians	A	2–0	Wilson, O'Hagan	2,000
29	30 March	Third Lanark	A	0–2		3,500
30	6 April	Partick Thistle	A	0–2		4,000
31	13 April	Clyde	H	3–0	McDonald, Wilson, Lennie	4,500
32	15 April	Heart of Midlothian	A	1–1	O'Hagan	4,000
33	4 May	Queen's Park	A	0–2		2,000
34	6 May	Hibernian	H	1–1	Own goal	5,000

==== Final standings ====
Pos	Team	Pld	W	D	L	GF	GA	GD	Pts
10	Motherwell	34	12	9	13	45	48	−3	33
11	Hibernian	34	10	10	14	40	49	−9	30
12	Aberdeen	34	10	10	14	48	55	−7	30
13	Morton	34	11	6	17	41	50	−9	28
14	Partick Thistle	34	9	8	17	40	60	−20	26

=== Scottish Cup ===
Round	Date	Opponent	H/A	Score	Aberdeen Scorer(s)	Attendance
R1	26 January	Johnstone	H	0–0		3,000
R1 R	9 February	Johnstone	A	1–2	H. Low	2,500

== Squad ==
=== Appearances & Goals ===
No.	Pos	Nat	Player	Total		Division One		Scottish Cup	
No.	Pos	Nat	Player	Apps	Goals	Apps	Goals	Apps	Goals
	DF	(Scotland) SCO	Pat Boyle	34	0	33	0	1	0
	DF	(Scotland) SCO	Willie Brebner	9	0	7	0	2	0
	MF	(Scotland) SCO	Stewart Davidson	4	0	4	0	0	0
	FW	(Scotland) SCO	John Edgar	15	2	15	2	0	0
	FW	(Scotland) SCO	John Ford	6	0	6	0	0	0
	DF	(Scotland) SCO	Jim Gault	23	0	22	0	1	0
	DF	(Scotland) SCO	Alex Halkett	32	0	30	0	2	0
	FW	(Scotland) SCO	Jim Haxton	7	1	7	1	0	0
	FW	(Scotland) SCO	Allan Lawrie	1	0	1	0	0	0
	FW	(Scotland) SCO	Willie Lennie	33	9	31	9	2	0
	FW	(Scotland) SCO	Harry Low	32	9	30	8	2	1
	MF	(Scotland) SCO	Wilf Low	31	0	29	0	2	0
	GK	(Scotland) SCO	Rab Macfarlane (c)	33	0	31	0	2	0
	FW	(Scotland) SCO	John McDonald	21	4	20	4	1	0
	FW	(Scotland) SCO	Dave McKinlay	16	5	14	5	2	0
	FW	(Scotland) SCO	Willie McWhinnie	1	0	1	0	0	0
	GK	(Scotland) SCO	Cody Mutch	3	0	3	0	0	0
	DF	(Scotland) SCO	Jack Newlands	1	0	1	0	0	0
	FW	(Ireland) EIR	Charlie O'Hagan	15	4	13	4	2	0
	MF	(Scotland) SCO	Gowie Robertson	2	0	2	0	0	0
	FW	(Scotland) SCO	Jimmy Robertson	6	0	6	0	0	0
	FW	(Scotland) SCO	Bobby Simpson	10	3	10	3	0	0
	DF	(Scotland) SCO	Tom Strang	27	0	25	0	2	0
	DF	(Scotland) SCO	John Urquhart	3	0	3	0	0	0
	FW	(England) ENG	Alf Ward	19	6	18	6	1	0
	DF	(Scotland) SCO	Sam Willox	1	0	1	0	0	0
	FW	(Scotland) SCO	George Wilson	11	4	11	4	0	0
