= 1905–06 Aberdeen F.C. season =

Aberdeen F.C.
1905–06 season
- Chairman: Alexander Milne / Thomas Duncan
- Manager: Jimmy Philip
- Scottish Football League Division One: 12th
- Scottish Cup: 2nd round
- Top goalscorer: League: George McNicol (9); All: George McNicol (9)
- Highest home attendance: 10,500 vs. Celtic, 3 March 1906
- Lowest home attendance: 4,500 (three times)

Aberdeen F.C. competed in Scottish Football League Division One and the Scottish Cup in season 1905–06.

== Overview ==
This was Aberdeen's third season overall and their first season in the top flight of Scottish football. The club were elected to the Division One despite finishing seventh in the Division Two the previous season. The Wasps struggled in Division One, finishing 12th out of 18 clubs and suffered an early exit from the Scottish Cup to Rangers.

== Results ==
=== Scottish Division One ===
Match Day	Date	Opponent	H/A	Score	Aberdeen Scorer(s)	Attendance
1	19 August	Partick Thistle	H	0–1		8,000
2	28 August	Rangers	A	0–1		10,000
3	2 September	Kilmarnock	H	2–0	McNicol (2)	6,000
4	9 September	Falkirk	A	2–2	H. Low, McNicol	3,500
5	16 September	Hibernian	H	2–1	J. Robertson (2)	7,000
6	23 September	Airdrieonians	A	0–2		5,000
7	25 September	Queen's Park	H	2–2	Ward, Lennie	8,000
8	30 September	St Mirren	A	2–4	Ward (2)	3,000
9	7 October	St Mirren	H	1–0	MacAulay	7,000
10	14 October	Third Lanark	A	0–1		5,000
11	21 October	Port Glasgow Athletic	H	2–2	McNicol, Lennie	5,000
12	28 October	Heart of Midlothian	A	1–1	McNicol	5,500
13	4 November	Morton	H	3–0	Edgar, McNicol, MacAulay	4,500
14	18 November	Dundee	A	0–6		12,000
15	25 November	Third Lanark	H	1–2	Edgar	4,500
16	2 December	Heart of Midlothian	H	2–1	McNicol, Lennie	7,000
17	9 December	Celtic	A	0–1		12,000
18	16 December	Rangers	H	1–1	McNicol	10,000
19	23 December	Falkirk	H	2–0	Boyle, Lennie	6,000
20	30 December	Kilmarnock	A	1–2	Edgar	3,000
21	2 January	Hibernian	A	0–1		4,000
22	6 January	Dundee	H	1–2	McNicol	4,500
23	13 January	Motherwell	A	3–3	H. Low, MacAulay, Lennie	4,000
24	20 January	Queen's Park	A	0–3		3,000
25	3 February	Morton	A	2–2	Strang, H. Low	4,000
26	17 February	Airdrieonians	H	1–2	C. Mackie	8,000
27	24 February	Motherwell	H	2–2	MacAulay, Edgar	6,000
28	3 March	Celtic	H	1–0	Ward	10,500
29	10 March	Partick Thistle	A	2–1	H. Low, Lennie	4,000
30	17 March	Port Glasgow Athletic	A	1–3	Boyle	2,000

==== Final standings ====
Pos	Team	Pld	W	D	L	GF	GA	GD	Pts
10	Motherwell	30	9	8	13	50	64	−14	26
11	Hibernian	30	10	5	15	35	40	−5	25
12	Aberdeen	30	8	8	14	37	49	−12	24
13	Falkirk	30	9	5	16	53	69	−16	23
14	Port Glasgow Athletic	30	6	8	16	38	68	−30	20

Source: "1905-1906 Division 1 - SPFL Archive". SPFL.

=== Scottish Cup ===
Round	Date	Opponent	H/A	Score	Aberdeen Scorer(s)	Attendance
R1	27 January	Dunfermline Athletic	H	3–0	Strang, C. Mackie, H. Low	6,000
R2	10 February	Rangers	A	2–3	C. Mackie (2)	11,023

== Squad ==
=== Appearances & Goals ===
No.	Pos	Nat	Player	Total		Division One		Scottish Cup	
No.	Pos	Nat	Player	Apps	Goals	Apps	Goals	Apps	Goals
	DF	(Scotland) SCO	Pat Boyle	22	2	20	2	2	0
	DF	(Scotland) SCO	Willie Brebner	1	0	1	0	0	0
	FW	(Scotland) SCO	Jim Bridges	1	0	1	0	0	0
	FW	(Scotland) SCO	Stewart Davidson	1	0	1	0	0	0
	FW	(Scotland) SCO	John Edgar	25	4	23	4	2	0
	DF	(Scotland) SCO	Jimmy Gault	30	0	28	0	2	0
	DF	(Scotland) SCO	Alex Halkett	24	0	22	0	2	0
	FW	(Scotland) SCO	Andy Hamilton	1	0	1	0	0	0
	FW	(Scotland) SCO	John Harvey	1	0	1	0	0	0
	FW	(Scotland) SCO	Peem Henderson	8	0	8	0	0	0
	FW	(Scotland) SCO	Sid Hilton	1	0	1	0	0	0
	FW	(Scotland) SCO	Willie Lennie	31	6	29	6	2	0
	FW	(Scotland) SCO	Harry Low	29	5	27	4	2	1
	DF	(Scotland) SCO	Wilf Low	14	0	13	0	1	0
	FW	(Scotland) SCO	Willie McAulay	25	4	24	4	1	0
	GK	(Scotland) SCO	Rab Macfarlane	32	0	30	0	2	0
	FW	(Scotland) SCO	Charles Mackie	8	4	6	1	2	3
	FW	(Scotland) SCO	George McNicol	12	9	12	9	0	0
	DF	(Scotland) SCO	Robert Murray	6	0	6	0	0	0
	DF	(Scotland) SCO	Gowie Robertson	4	0	4	0	0	0
	FW	(Scotland) SCO	Jimmy Robertson	31	2	29	2	2	0
	DF	(Scotland) SCO	Tom Strang (c)	31	2	30	1	1	1
	FW	(England) ENG	Alf Ward	8	4	8	4	0	0
	DF	(Scotland) SCO	Sam Willox	5	0	5	0	0	0
