= 1907–08 Aberdeen F.C. season =

Aberdeen F.C.
1907–08 season
- Chairman: Thomas Duncan
- Manager: Jimmy Philip
- Scottish Football League Division One: 8th
- Scottish Cup: Semi-final
- Top goalscorer: League: Tom Murray (14); All: Tom Murray (19)
- Highest home attendance: 20,000 vs. Celtic, 21 March 1908
- Lowest home attendance: 3,000 vs. Queen's Park, 20 April 1908

Aberdeen F.C. competed in Scottish Football League Division One and the Scottish Cup in season 1907–08.

== Overview ==
This was Aberdeen's fifth season and their third in the top flight of Scottish football. Aberdeen improved on their league finish from the previous season, finishing eighth place out of 18 clubs. They also had their best season to date in the Scottish Cup, going all the way to the semi-final but losing 0–1 to Celtic. Notable new signings included Donald Colman from Motherwell. In this season, Willie Lennie became the first Aberdeen player to be capped for Scotland when he played against Wales in March 1908.

== Results ==
=== Scottish Division One ===
Match Day	Date	Opponent	H/A	Score	Aberdeen Scorer(s)	Attendance
1	17 August	Clyde	H	3–1	Halkett, McDonald, Lennie	8,000
2	24 August	Rangers	A	0–4		20,000
3	31 August	Morton	H	1–2	Lennie	4,000
4	7 September	Hibernian	A	0–1		8,000
5	14 September	St Mirren	H	1–3	B. Simpson	6,000
6	21 September	Dundee	A	0–1		8,500
7	23 September	Celtic	H	2–1	McDonald (2)	9,500
8	28 September	Partick Thistle	H	1–0	Lennie	7,500
9	5 October	Kilmarnock	H	1–0	Murray	7,000
10	12 October	Falkirk	A	0–4		5,500
11	19 October	Third Lanark	H	1–1	Murray	7,000
12	26 October	Heart of Midlothian	A	1–3	McDonald	8,000
13	2 November	Hamilton Academical	H	3–0	B. Simpson (2), O'Hagan	4,500
14	9 November	Queen's Park	A	2–2	Murray, Lennie	3,500
15	16 November	Motherwell	A	3–2	McDonald, Murray, Lennie	4,000
16	23 November	Port Glasgow Athletic	H	3–1	Murray, O'Hagan, Lennie	7,000
17	30 November	St Mirren	A	3–0	Simpson, Murray, Lennie	3,500
18	7 December	Dundee	H	1–1	Murray	16,000
19	14 December	Third Lanark	A	1–1	Murray	4,000
20	21 December	Heart of Midlothian	H	1–0	Murray	5,500
21	28 December	Morton	A	0–2		3,000
22	1 January	Airdrieonians	A	1–0	Murray	3,000
23	2 January	Celtic	A	0–2		6,000
24	11 January	Falkirk	H	1–1	Lennie	11,000
25	18 January	Rangers	H	0–0		10,000
26	1 February	Hamilton Academical	A	0–3		3,000
27	29 February	Kilmarnock	A	0–1		4,000
28	7 March	Motherwell	H	2–1	Murray, O'Hagan	4,500
29	14 March	Port Glasgow Athletic	A	1–1	B. Simpson	2,000
30	28 March	Airdrieonians	H	0–1		5,500
31	4 April	Partick Thistle	A (Note: This game was played at Aberdeen's ground (Pittodrie), despite Partick Thistle being the home team.)	6–0	Davidson, W. Low, Muir, Murray, O'Hagan, Lennie	1,000
32	18 April	Hibernian	H	1–1	O'Hagan	4,000
33	20 April	Queen's Park	H	3–0	B. Simpson, Murray (2)	3,000
34	25 April	Clyde	A	2–2	Muir, Lennie	3,000

==== Final standings ====
Pos	Team	Pld	W	D	L	GF	GA	GD	Pts
6	Airdrieonians	34	18	5	11	58	41	+17	41
7	St Mirren	34	13	10	11	50	59	−9	36
8	Aberdeen	34	13	9	12	45	44	+1	35
9	Third Lanark	34	13	7	14	45	50	−5	33
10	Motherwell	34	12	7	15	61	53	+8	31

=== Scottish Cup ===
Round	Date	Opponent	H/A	Score	Aberdeen Scorer(s)	Attendance
R1	25 January	Albion Rovers	H	3–0	Muir 2, McDonald	5,000
R2	8 February	Dundee	H	0–0		18,000
R2 R	15 February	Dundee	A	2–2	Murray, O'Hagan	23,000
R2 2R	19 February	Dundee	N	3–1	Own goal, Murray, Lennie	24,000
QF	22 February	Queen's Park	H	3–1	Murray (3)	17,000
SF	21 March	Celtic	H	0–1		20,000

== Squad ==
=== Appearances & Goals ===
No.	Pos	Nat	Player	Total		Division One		Scottish Cup	
No.	Pos	Nat	Player	Apps	Goals	Apps	Goals	Apps	Goals
	DF	(Scotland) SCO	Willie Brebner	1	0	1	0	0	0
	DF	(Scotland) SCO	Donald Colman	34	0	28	0	6	0
	DF	(Scotland) SCO	Stewart Davidson	7	1	7	1	0	0
	MF	(Scotland) SCO	Tom Drain	7	0	7	0	0	0
	DF	(Scotland) SCO	Alex Halkett (c)	35	1	29	1	6	0
	DF	(Scotland) SCO	Jock Hume	39	0	33	0	6	0
	FW	(Scotland) SCO	Willie Lennie	37	11	31	10	6	1
	MF	(Scotland) SCO	Wilf Low	35	1	29	1	6	0
	GK	(Scotland) SCO	Rab Macfarlane	33	0	29	0	4	0
	FW	(Scotland) SCO	John McDonald	30	6	24	5	6	1
	FW	(Scotland) SCO	Vic McEchern	6	0	6	0	0	0
	MF	(Scotland) SCO	Jim Mcintosh	38	0	32	0	6	0
	FW	(Scotland) SCO	Dave McKinlay	4	0	4	0	0	0
	FW	(Scotland) SCO	Jim Muir	23	4	17	2	6	2
	FW	(Scotland) SCO	Tom Murray	38	19	32	14	6	5
	GK	(Scotland) SCO	Cody Mutch	7	0	5	0	2	0
	FW	(Ireland) EIR	Charlie O'Hagan	35	6	29	5	6	1
	DF	(Scotland) SCO	Ken Ross	1	0	1	0	0	0
	MF	(England) ENG	J.J. Simpson	1	0	1	0	0	0
	FW	(England) ENG	Bobby Simpson	22	6	22	6	0	0
	MF	(Scotland) SCO	George Wilson	7	0	7	0	0	0

== Notes ==
- Kevin Stirling. Aberdeen A Centenary History 1903-2003. Desert Island Books 2002. ISBN 1-874287-49-X.
