= 1903–04 Dundee F.C. season =

Dundee
1903–04 season
- Manager: William Wallace
- Stadium: Dens Park
- Division One: 5th
- Scottish Cup: Quarter-finals
- Top goalscorer: League: Jimmy Dickson (13); All: Jimmy Dickson (13)
Home colours

The 1903–04 season was the eleventh season in which Dundee competed at a Scottish national level, playing in Division One, where they would finish in 5th place. Dundee would also compete in the Scottish Cup, where they would progress to the quarter-finals and take eventual champions Celtic to two replays before being defeated. This would be the first season where Dundee would wear their now common look of navy shirts, white shorts and navy socks.

== Scottish Division One ==
Statistics provided by Dee Archive

Match day	Date	Opponent	H/A	Score	Dundee scorer(s)	Attendance
1	15 August	Greenock Morton	H	6–0	Wilson (2), MacFarlane (2), Dickson, Lennie	10,200
2	22 August	Queen's Park	H	3–0	MacFarlane (2), Lennie	10,640
3	29 August	Heart of Midlothian	A	2–4	Wilson, Bell	10,000
4	5 September	Kilmarnock	H	4–0	Lennie, Wilson, Dickson, Sharp	8,740
5	12 September	Port Glasgow Athletic	A	3–1	Wilson (2), Lennie	6,000
6	19 September	Motherwell	A	3–1	Dickson (2), Lennie	5,000
7	26 September	St Mirren	H	0–2		8,000
8	3 October	Third Lanark	H	0–1		11,480
9	10 October	Celtic	A	2–4	Horne, MacFarlane	8,000
10	17 October	Heart of Midlothian	H	2–1	Morgan, Wilson	11,720
11	24 October	St Mirren	A	1–1	Dickson	9,560
12	31 October	Rangers	A	1–6	Lennie	10,300
13	7 November	Kilmarnock	A	1–0	Dickson	
14	14 November	Airdrieonians	H	4–3	Sharp (2), Wilson, Horne	7,500
15	21 November	Rangers	H	3–1	Boyle, Dickson, Robertson	14,400
16	28 November	Hibernian	A	1–0	Dickson	1,500
17	5 December	Motherwell	H	7–1	Horne, Dickson (3), Bell, Morgan, MacFarlane	6,260
18	12 December	Hibernian	H	1–2	Morgan	10,000
19	19 December	Airdrieonians	A	1–2	Dickson	
20	2 January	Greenock Morton	A	1–1	McDiarmid	3,000
21	9 January	Queen's Park	A	1–2	Dickson	6,500
22	16 January	Partick Thistle	H	3–0	Morgan, MacFarlane, Lennie	7,500
23	30 January	Celtic	H	2–1	MacFarlane, Boyle	17,700
24	6 February	Partick Thistle	A	1–6	MacFarlane	
25	26 March	Port Glasgow Athletic	H	0–1		
26	23 April	Third Lanark	A	1–4	Cowie	7,000

=== League table ===
Pos	Team	Pld	W	D	L	GF	GA	GD	Pts
=3	Celtic	26	18	2	6	68	27	+41	38
=3	Rangers	26	16	6	4	80	33	+47	38
5	Dundee	26	13	2	11	54	45	+9	28
=6	St Mirren	26	11	5	10	45	38	+7	27
=6	Partick Thistle	26	10	7	9	46	41	+5	27

Source: nozdrul.plus.com

== Scottish Cup ==
Statistics provided by Dee Archive

Match day	Date	Opponent	H/A	Score	Dundee scorer(s)	Attendance
1st round	23 January	Queen's Park	H	3–0	Bell, Jeffray, Morgan	15,000
2nd round	13 February	Abercorn	H	4–0	Morgan, Boyle, Lennie, Waldron (o.g.)	5,000
Quarter-finals	20 February	Celtic	A	1–1	McAulay	19,000
QF replay	27 February	Celtic	H	0–0		21,000
QF 2nd replay	5 March	Celtic	A	0–5		39,000

== Player statistics ==
Statistics provided by Dee Archive

No.	Pos	Nat	Player	Total		First Division		Scottish Cup	
No.	Pos	Nat	Player	Apps	Goals	Apps	Goals	Apps	Goals
	FW	(Scotland) SCO	Alan Bell	26	3	21	2	5	1
	DF	(Scotland) SCO	Dickie Boyle	31	3	26	2	5	1
	FW	(Scotland) SCO	Arthur Brand	1	0	1	0	0	0
	DF	(Scotland) SCO	John Chaplin	2	0	2	0	0	0
	FW	(Scotland) SCO	Dave Cowie	1	1	1	1	0	0
	DF	(Scotland) SCO	Johnny Darroch	10	0	8	0	2	0
	FW	(Scotland) SCO	Jimmy Dickson	20	13	20	13	0	0
	GK	(Scotland) SCO	David Foster	3	0	3	0	0	0
	FW	(Scotland) SCO	Sam Gilligan	1	0	1	0	0	0
	MF	(Scotland) SCO	Alick Halkett	16	0	13	0	3	0
	FW	(Scotland) SCO	Andy Horne	11	3	11	3	0	0
	MF	(Scotland) SCO	Jimmy Jeffray	30	1	25	0	5	1
	FW	(Scotland) SCO	Willie Lennie	21	8	16	7	5	1
	FW	(Scotland) SCO	Sandy MacFarlane	31	9	26	9	5	0
	FW	(Scotland) SCO	William McAulay	7	1	2	0	5	1
	FW	(Scotland) SCO	Fred McDiarmid	31	1	26	1	5	0
	FW	(Scotland) SCO	Hugh Morgan	23	6	18	4	5	2
	MF	(Scotland) SCO	Charlie Morris	1	0	1	0	0	0
	GK	(Scotland) SCO	Willie Muir	28	0	23	0	5	0
	MF	(Scotland) SCO	Peter Robertson	13	1	13	1	0	0
	DF	(Scotland) SCO	Jimmy Sharp	21	3	16	3	5	0
	FW	(England) ENG	David Wilson	13	8	13	8	0	0

== See also ==
- List of Dundee F.C. seasons
