= William Jaffray (footballer) =

Scottish football player (1885–1968)

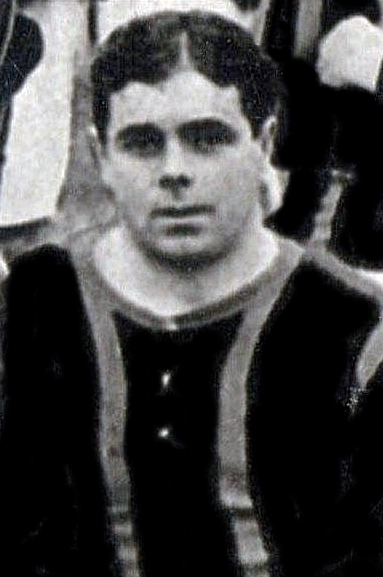
- Jaffray while with Brentford in 1908.

Personal information
- Full name: William Frederick Jaffray
- Date of birth: 25 March 1885
- Place of birth: Aberdeen, Scotland
- Date of death: 7 May 1968 (aged 83)
- Place of death: Lake County, Ohio, United States
- Position: Outside left

Senior career*
Years	Team	Apps	(Gls)
–1905	Peterhead		
1905–1908	Aberdeen	1	(0)
1907–1908	→ Leith Athletic (loan)	16	(2)
1908	Raith Rovers	0	(0)
1908–1909	Brentford	4	(0)
1909–1911	Aberdeen	0	(0)
1911	Brechin City		
- * Club domestic league appearances and goals

William Frederick Jaffray (25 March 1885 – 7 May 1968) was a Scottish professional footballer who played in the Scottish League for Aberdeen as an outside left.

== Career statistics ==
Appearances and goals by club, season and competition
Club	Season	League			National Cup		Other		Total	
Club	Season	Division	Apps	Goals	Apps	Goals	Apps	Goals	Apps	Goals
Aberdeen	1904–05	Scottish League Second Division	1	0	0	0	—		1	0
Aberdeen	1907–08	Scottish League First Division	0	0	0	0	1 (Note: Appearance in Fleming Charity Shield)	0	1	0
Aberdeen	1908–09	Scottish League First Division	0	0	0	0	1	0	1	0
Aberdeen	Total		1	0	0	0	2	0	3	0
Leith Athletic (loan)	1907–08	Scottish League Second Division	16	2	6	0	—		22	2
Brentford	1908–09	Southern League First Division	4	0	0	0	—		4	0
Career total			21	2	6	0	2	0	29	2
