= 1904–05 Rangers F.C. season =

Rangers
1904–05 season
- Chairman: James Henderson
- Manager: William Wilton
- Ground: Ibrox Park
- Scottish League Division One: 2nd P26 W19 D3 L4 F83 A28 Pts41
- Scottish Cup: Runners-up
- Top goalscorer: League: Robert Hamilton (19); All: Robert Hamilton (19)

The 1904–05 season was the 31st season of competitive football by Rangers.

== Overview ==
Rangers played a total of 33 competitive matches during the 1904–05 season. The team finished joint top of the league with Celtic, equal on points but with better goal difference. Since the concept of goal difference was not considered both teams played a Championship play-off which Celtic won 1–2.

The Scottish Cup campaign saw the team reach the final where they played Third Lanark. The final ended in a draw and Rangers lost the replay 1–3 at Hampden Park.

== Results ==
All results are written with Rangers' score first.

=== Scottish League Division One ===
Date	Opponent	Venue	Result	Attendance	Scorers
20 August 1904	Third Lanark	A	1–2	20,000	Mackie
27 August 1904	Hibernian	H	4–0	12,000	Hamilton (2), Mackie, Kyle
3 September 1904	Partick Thistle	H	8–1	7,000	Speedie (3), Kyle (2), Hamilton (2), Stark
10 September 1904	Dundee	A	3–0	14,760	Hamilton (2), Chaplin (og)
17 September 1904	Queen's Park	A	4–0	30,231	Kyle (2), A.Smith, Hamilton
19 September 1904	Hibernian	A	2–1		Hamilton, McColl
26 September 1904	Heart of Midlothian	H	1–1	20,188	Speedie
1 October 1904	St Mirren	H	2–3	10,000	Mackie, Turnbull
15 October 1904	Celtic	A	2–2	25,000	Hamilton, Mackie
22 October 1904	Queen's Park	H	5–0	15,000	Mackie (2), Walker, McColl, Hamilton
29 October 1904	Dundee	H	2–1	13,000	McColl, Mackie
5 November 1904	Heart of Midlothian	A	5–0	10,000	Walker (2), A.Smith, Speedie, Hamilton
12 November 1904	St Mirren	A	0–3		
19 November 1904	Third Lanark	H	3–1		Kyle (2), A.Smith
3 December 1904	Kilmarnock	A	4–0	6,500	Kyle (2), Hamilton, Robertson
10 December 1904	Motherwell	A	2–0	5,000	McLean (og), Hamilton
17 December 1904	Airdrieonians	H	4–1	4,000	Speedie, Hamilton, Kyle, Mackie
31 December 1904	Airdrieonians	A	2–2	8,000	May, Speedie (pen)
3 January 1905	Partick Thistle	A	4–1	11,000	Hamilton (2), Kyle, Robertson
14 January 1905	Motherwell	H	3–2	6,000	Speedie (2, 1 pen), McColl
21 January 1905	Kilmarnock	H	6–2		Speedie (2), May, Walker, McColl, Mackie
4 February 1905	Port Glasgow	A	3–0	7,000	McColl (2), Walker
18 February 1905	Celtic	H	1–4	30,000	Kyle
18 March 1905	Port Glasgow	H	5–1	5,000	A.Smith (2), Hamilton, Speedie, Low
1 April 1905	Greenock Morton	H	5–0	5,000	Hamilton (2), A.Smith (2), Kyle
29 April 1905	Greenock Morton	A	2–0	3,000	Speedie, Kyle

==== Championship play-off ====
Date	Opponent	Venue	Result	Attendance	Scorers
6 May 1905	Celtic	N	1–2	30,000	Robertson

=== Scottish Cup ===
Date	Round	Opponent	Venue	Result	Attendance	Scorers
28 January 1905	R1	Ayr Parkhouse	H	2–1	7,000	Robertson, Chalmers
11 February 1905	R2	Greenock Morton	A	6–0	9,000	McColl (2), Speedie (2, 1 pen), Kyle, Walker
25 February 1905	QF	Beith	H	5–1	4,000	Kyle (2), Speedie (2), Chalmers
25 March 1905	SF	Celtic	A	2–0	36,000	Speedie, Robertson
8 April 1905	F	Third Lanark	N	0–0	55,000	
15 April 1905	F	Third Lanark	N	1–3	40,000	A.Smith

== Appearances ==
Player	Position	Appearances	Goals
(Scotland) William Allan	GK	8	0
(Scotland) Alex Fraser	DF	17	0
(Scotland) George Gilchrist	DF	1	0
(Scotland) George Henderson	DF	17	0
(Scotland) John May	DF	26	2
(Scotland) John Tait Robertson	DF	27	5
(Scotland) Archie Kyle	FW	28	17
(Scotland) Alec Mackie	FW	21	8
(Scotland) RC Hamilton	FW	18	19
(Scotland) Finlay Speedie	FW	33	18
(Scotland) Alec Smith	FW	33	8
(Scotland) Nicol Smith	DF	12	0
(Scotland) James Stark	DF	20	1
(Scotland) Andrew Easton	DF	9	0
(Scotland) RS McColl	FW	17	9
(Scotland) Charles Donaghy	FW	3	0
(Scotland) John Walker	FW	14	6
(Scotland) James Turnbull	FW	1	1
(Scotland) John Watson	GK	2	0
(Scotland) Adam Gourlay	DF	4	0
(Scotland) Tom Sinclair	GK	23	0
(Scotland) Bob McEwan	DF	12	0
(Scotland) Robert Campbell	DF	5	0
(Ireland) Alex Craig	DF	7	0
(Scotland) Tommy Low	MF	2	1
(Scotland) John Chalmers	MF	3	2

== See also ==
- 1904–05 in Scottish football
- 1904–05 Scottish Cup
