= 1902–03 Rangers F.C. season =

Rangers
1902–03 season
- Chairman: James Henderson
- Manager: William Wilton
- Ground: Ibrox Park
- Scottish League Division One: 3rd P22 W12 D5 L5 F56 A24 Pts29
- Scottish Cup: Winners
- Top goalscorer: League: Robert Hamilton (13); All: Robert Hamilton (18)

The 1902–03 season was the 29th season of competitive football by Rangers.

== Overview ==
Rangers played a total of 29 competitive matches during the 1902–03 season. The team finished third in Scottish League Division One, eight points behind champions Hibernian. The team managed twelve wins from the twenty-two league matches.

The Scottish Cup campaign ended in success as the team defeated Hearts 2–0 in the second final replay. The two previous final matches were a 1–1 and 0–0 draw and all were played at Celtic Park, Glasgow.

== Results ==
All results are written with Rangers' score first.

=== Scottish League Division One ===
Date	Opponent	Venue	Result	Attendance	Scorers
16 August 1902	Third Lanark	A	2–4	13,000	Hamilton (2)
23 August 1902	Partick Thistle	H	9–0	7,000	Hamilton (4), Neil (2), Lennie (2), Mackie
30 August 1902	Port Glasgow	A	3–0	7,000	Stark, Neil (pen), Hamilton
6 September 1902	Heart of Midlothian	A	1–2	14,000	Neil (pen)
15 September 1902	Hibernian	A	0–1	6,500	
20 September 1902	Greenock Morton	H	4–1	6,500	Fraser, Hamilton, McDonald, Smith
4 October 1902	Heart of Midlothian	H	2–1	11,000	Speedie (2)
11 October 1902	Greenock Morton	A	4–0	7,000	McDonald (2), Robertson, Hamilton
18 October 1902	Celtic	A	1–1	25,000	Smith
27 October 1902	Queen's Park	A	2–0	12,000	Mackie, Hamilton
29 October 1902	Hibernian	H	2–5	15,000	Walker, Stark
1 November 1902	Third Lanark	H	2–0	12,000	Mackie (2)
8 November 1902	Partick Thistle	A	4–2	7,000	Smith (2), Neil (pen), Walker
15 November 1902	Queen's Park	H	3–2	10,000	Speedie, Robertson, Neil
22 November 1902	St Mirren	A	1–0	4,000	Smith
29 November 1902	Kilmarnock	H	5–0	4,500	Walker (2), Smith, Hamilton, McDonald
6 December 1902	Dundee	A	1–3	12,000	Neil
13 December 1902	Port Glasgow	H	4–2	3,000	Hamilton (2), Brodie, Speedie
20 December 1902	Kilmarnock	A	0–0	4,000	
1 January 1903	Celtic	H	3–3	25,000	Walker (2), Neil
3 February 1903	St Mirren	H	2–2	6,000	McDonald, Walker
17 February 1903	Dundee	H	1–1	10,000	Gibson

=== Scottish Cup ===
Date	Round	Opponent	Venue	Result	Attendance	Scorers
10 January 1903	R1	Auchterarder Thistle	H	7–0	2,000	Speedie (3), McDonald (2), Hamilton, Gibson
24 February 1903	R2	Kilmarnock	H	4–0	7,500	Walker (2), Robertson, McDonald
28 February 1903	QF	Celtic	A	3–0	40,000	A.Smith, Walker, Hamilton
7 March 1903	SF	Stenhousemuir	A	4–1	8,000	Robertson (2), Hamilton (2)
11 April 1903	F	Heart of Midlothian	N	1–1	28,000	Stark
18 April 1903	F R	Heart of Midlothian	N	0–0	16,000	
25 April 1903	F 2R	Heart of Midlothian	N	2–0	32,000	Mackie, Hamilton

== Appearances ==
Player	Position	Appearances	Goals
(Scotland) Matthew Dickie	GK	28	0
(Scotland) David Crawford	DF	5	0
(Scotland) Jock Drummond	DF	25	0
(Scotland) Neilly Gibson	MF	23	2
(Scotland) Robert Neil	DF	17	8
(Scotland) John Tait Robertson	DF	27	5
(Scotland) James Graham	MF	2	0
(Scotland) John Walker	FW	22	10
(Scotland) Robert Hamilton	FW	26	18
(Scotland) Alec Mackie	FW	9	5
(Scotland) Alex Smith	FW	29	7
(Scotland) William Lennie	MF	5	2
(Scotland) Nicol Smith	DF	7	0
(Scotland) James Stark	DF	19	3
(Scotland) William Walker	MF	2	0
(Scotland) Finlay Speedie	FW	25	7
(Scotland) Alex Fraser	DF	22	1
(Scotland) Angus McDonald	MF	20	8
(Scotland) William Wallace	GK	1	0
(Scotland) George Henderson	DF	3	0
(Scotland) Alexander Brodie	MF	1	1
(Scotland) Alexander McMurray	MF	2	0

== See also ==
- 1902–03 in Scottish football
- 1902–03 Scottish Cup
