= 1904–05 Manchester United F.C. season =

English football club season

Manchester United
1904–05 season
- Chairman: John Henry Davies
- Manager: Ernest Mangnall
- Stadium: Bank Street Ground
- Second Division: 3rd
- FA Cup: Intermediate Round
- Top goalscorer: League: Jack Peddie (17); All: Jack Peddie (17)
- Highest home attendance: 40,000 vs Liverpool (24 December 1904)
- Lowest home attendance: 4,000 vs Blackpool (24 April 1905)
- Average home league attendance: 15,000
Home colours	Away colours

The 1904–05 season was Manchester United's 13th season in the Football League. United finished 3rd in the Second Division. The Reds also competed in the FA Cup, but failed to get past the Intermediate Round stage, losing to Fulham.

== Second Division ==
Date	Opponents	H / A	Result F–A	Scorers	Attendance
3 September 1904	Port Vale	A	2–2	Allan (2)	4,000
10 September 1904	Bristol City	H	4–1	Peddie, S. Robertson, A. Schofield, Williams	20,000
17 September 1904	Bolton Wanderers	H	1–2	Mackie	25,000
24 September 1904	Glossop	A	2–1	Allan, Roberts	6,000
8 October 1904	Bradford City	A	1–1	Arkesden	12,000
15 October 1904	Lincoln City	H	2–0	Arkesden, A. Schofield	15,000
22 October 1904	Leicester Fosse	A	3–0	Arkesden, Peddie, A. Schofield	7,000
29 October 1904	Barnsley	H	4–0	Allan, Downie, Peddie, A. Schofield	15,000
5 November 1904	West Bromwich Albion	A	2–0	Arkesden, Williams	5,000
12 November 1904	Burnley	H	1–0	Arkesden	15,000
19 November 1904	Grimsby Town	A	1–0	Bell	4,000
3 December 1904	Doncaster Rovers	A	1–0	Peddie	10,000
10 December 1904	Gainsborough Trinity	H	3–1	Arkesden (2), Allan	12,000
17 December 1904	Burton United	A	3–2	Peddie (3)	3,000
24 December 1904	Liverpool	H	3–1	Arkesden, Roberts, Williams	40,000
26 December 1904	Chesterfield	H	3–0	Allan (2), Williams	20,000
31 December 1904	Port Vale	H	6–1	Allan (3), Arkesden, Hayes, Roberts	8,000
2 January 1905	Bradford City	H	7–0	Arkesden (2), Roberts (2), Allan, Peddie, own goal	10,000
3 January 1905	Bolton Wanderers	A	4–2	Allan (2), Peddie, Williams	35,000
7 January 1905	Bristol City	A	1–1	Arkesden	12,000
21 January 1905	Glossop	H	4–1	Mackie (2), Arkesden, Grassam	20,000
11 February 1905	Lincoln City	A	0–3		2,000
18 February 1905	Leicester Fosse	H	4–1	Peddie (3), Allan	7,000
25 February 1905	Barnsley	A	0–0		5,000
4 March 1905	West Bromwich Albion	H	2–0	Peddie, Williams	8,000
11 March 1905	Burnley	A	0–2		7,000
18 March 1905	Grimsby Town	H	2–1	Allan, Duckworth	12,000
25 March 1905	Blackpool	A	1–0	Grassam	6,000
1 April 1905	Doncaster Rovers	H	6–0	Duckworth (3), Beddow, Peddie, Wombwell	6000
8 April 1905	Gainsborough Trinity	A	0–0		6,000
15 April 1905	Burton United	H	5–0	Duckworth (2), Peddie (2), Arkesden	16,000
21 April 1905	Chesterfield	A	0–2		10,000
22 April 1905	Liverpool	A	0–4		28,000
24 April 1905	Blackpool	H	3–1	Allan, Arkesden, Peddie	4,000

Pos	Team	Pld	W	D	L	GF	GA	GAv	Pts	Promotion or relegation
1	Liverpool (C, P)	34	27	4	3	93	25	3.720	58	Promotion to the First Division
2	Bolton Wanderers (P)	34	27	2	5	87	32	2.719	56	Promotion to the First Division
3	Manchester United	34	24	5	5	81	30	2.700	53	
4	Bristol City	34	19	4	11	66	45	1.467	42	
5	Chesterfield Town	34	14	11	9	44	35	1.257	39	

(C) Champions; (P) Promoted

== FA Cup ==
Manchester United entered the 1904–05 FA Cup at the Intermediate Round stage and were drawn at home to Fulham on 14 January 1905. The match finished 2–2, with goals from Tommy Arkesden and Charles Mackie. The replay was played four days later away at Craven Cottage, and ended scoreless. On 23 January, Fulham and United played a second replay at the neutral venue of Villa Park, which Fulham won by a single goal.

Date	Round	Opponents	H / A	Result F–A	Scorers	Attendance
14 January 1905	Intermediate Round	Fulham	H	2–2	Arkesden, Mackie	17,000
18 January 1905	Intermediate Round; Replay	Fulham	A	0–0		15,000
23 January 1905	Intermediate Round; 2nd Replay	Fulham	N	0–1		6,000

== Squad statistics ==
Pos.	Name	League		FA Cup		Total	
Pos.	Name	Apps	Goals	Apps	Goals	Apps	Goals
GK	(England) Harry Moger	32	0	3	0	35	0
GK	(England) Bob Valentine	2	0	0	0	2	0
FB	(Scotland) Tommy Blackstock	3	0	0	0	3	0
FB	(Scotland) Bob Bonthron	32	0	3	0	35	0
FB	(England) John Fitchett	11	0	2	0	13	0
FB	(England) Vince Hayes	22	1	3	0	25	1
FB	(England) Dick Holden	1	0	0	0	1	0
HB	(Scotland) Alex Bell	29	1	3	0	32	1
HB	(Scotland) Alex Downie	32	1	3	0	35	1
HB	(England) Dick Duckworth	8	6	0	0	8	6
HB	(England) Billy Griffiths	2	0	0	0	2	0
HB	(England) Charlie Roberts	28	5	0	0	28	5
HB	(Scotland) Sandy Robertson	8	1	0	0	8	1
FW	(England) Jack Allan	27	16	0	0	27	16
FW	(England) Tommy Arkesden	28	15	3	1	31	16
FW	(England) Clem Beddow	9	1	0	0	9	1
FW	(Scotland) Billy Grassam	6	2	3	0	9	2
FW	(England) William Hartwell	2	0	1	0	3	0
FW	(England) George Lyons	0	0	1	0	1	0
FW	(Scotland) Charles Mackie	5	3	2	1	7	4
FW	(Scotland) Jack Peddie (c)	32	17	0	0	32	17
FW	(Scotland) Alex Robertson	1	0	1	0	2	0
FW	(England) Alf Schofield	24	4	3	0	27	4
FW	(England) Harry Williams	22	6	2	0	24	6
FW	(England) Dick Wombwell	8	1	0	0	8	1
