= 1904–05 Aberdeen F.C. season =

Aberdeen F.C.
1904–05 season
- Chairman: Alexander Milne
- Manager: Jimmy Philip
- Scottish Football League Division Two: 7th
- Scottish Cup: Third round
- Top goalscorer: League: Tom Ruddiman (7); All: Tom Ruddiman (10)
- Highest home attendance: 16,000 vs. Queen's Park, 28 January 1905
- Lowest home attendance: 1,000 vs. Hamilton Academical, 10 December 1904

Aberdeen F.C. competed in the Scottish Football League Division Two and the Scottish Cup in season 1904–05.

== Overview ==
Season 1904–05 was Aberdeen's second season and their first in Scottish League football. They failed to gain election to Division One in 1904, but successfully applied to join Division Two. The team abandoned their white jerseys for a new black and gold strip this season. The Pittodrie attendance record was broken in January when 16,000 spectators watched as Glasgow club Queen's Park visited Aberdeen in the Scottish Cup. In the league, Aberdeen finished seventh out of twelve clubs. In the cup, they won through to round three after wins over Queen's Park and Bathgate, but lost to Third Lanark at Cathkin Park. Tom Ruddiman finished as the club's top scorer with ten goals from 15 appearances.

== Results ==
=== Scottish Division Two ===
Match Day	Date	Opponent	H/A	Score	Aberdeen Scorer(s)	Attendance
1	20 August	Falkirk	H	1–2	Knowles	6,000
2	27 August	Clyde	H	0–1		5,000
3	10 September	Hamilton Academical	A	3–3	H. Low, G. McNicol (2)	3,000
4	24 September	Abercorn	H	3–1	Ellis, MacAulay, Ritchie	2,000
5	22 October	Raith Rovers	H	3–1	Own goal, G. McNicol, Mackie	5,000
6	5 November	East Stirlingshire	A	4–1	A. Lowe (4)	2,000
7	19 November	Ayr	A	3–3	G. McNicol, A. Lowe (2)	1,000
8	10 December	Hamilton Academical	H	1–2	Ritchie	1,000
9	17 December	Clyde	A	0–1		1,000
10	24 December	St Bernard's	A	3–0	Ruddiman (2), MacAulay	2,000
11	31 December	East Stirlingshire	H	3–0	Ruddiman (3)	3,000
12	7 January	Raith Rovers	A	0–1		1,000
13	14 January	Albion Rovers	A	0–1		3,000
14	21 January	St Bernard's	H	1–1	Edgar	3,000
15	4 February	Abercorn	A	1–3	H. Low	2,000
16	4 March	Albion Rovers	H	7–2	Halkett, Harvey, G. McNicol, Ruddiman (2), MacAulay (2)	5,500
17	11 March	Arthurlie	A	0–2		1,000
18	18 March	Leith Athletic	A	1–1	J. Robertson	1,500
19	25 March	Ayr	H	2–0	Harvey, Edgar	2,500
20	1 April	Falkirk	A	0–0		1,000
21	8 April	Arthurlie	H	0–0		3,000
22	15 April	Leith Athletic	H	0–0		2,000

==== Final standings ====
Pos	Team	Pld	W	D	L	GF	GA	GD	Pts	Promotion or relegation
5	Arthurlie	22	9	5	8	37	41	−4	23	
5	Ayr	22	11	1	10	46	37	+9	23	
7	Aberdeen (P)	22	7	7	8	36	26	+10	21	Promoted to the 1905–06 Scottish Division One
8	Albion Rovers	22	8	4	10	38	53	−15	20	
9	East Stirlingshire	22	7	5	10	37	38	−1	19	

Source: statto.com
Rules for classification: Teams finish equal if level on points. Points system: 2 points for a win, 1 point for a draw, 0 points for a loss
(P) Promoted

=== Scottish Cup ===
Round	Date	Opponent	H/A	Score	Aberdeen Scorer(s)	Attendance
R1	28 January	Queen's Park	H	2–1	W. Low, J. Robertson	16,000
R2	11 February	Bathgate	H	1–1 (abandoned)	Edgar	3,000
R2 R	18 February	Bathgate	H	6–1	J. Robertson (2), Ruddiman (2), MacAulay, Ritchie	7,000
R3	25 February	Third Lanark	A	1–4	Ruddiman	10,000

== Squad ==
=== Appearances & Goals ===
No.	Pos	Nat	Player	Total		División Two		Scottish Cup	
No.	Pos	Nat	Player	Apps	Goals	Apps	Goals	Apps	Goals
	GK	(Scotland) SCO	Frank Barrett	1	0	1	0	0	0
	DF	(Scotland) SCO	Willie Brebner	3	0	1	0	2	0
	FW	(Scotland) SCO	John Edgar	17	3	14	2	3	1
	FW	(Scotland) SCO	John Ellis	3	1	3	1	0	0
	DF	(Scotland) SCO	Alex Halkett	19	1	16	1	3	0
	FW	(Scotland) SCO	John Harvey	8	2	8	2	0	0
	FW	(Scotland) SCO	William Jaffrey	1	0	1	0	0	0
	FW	(Scotland) SCO	WG Johnston	2	0	2	0	0	0
	FW	(Scotland) SCO	John Knowles	2	1	2	1	0	0
	MF	(Scotland) SCO	Harry Low	24	2	21	2	3	0
	DF	(Scotland) SCO	Wilf Low	5	1	4	0	1	1
	FW	(Scotland) SCO	Augustus Lowe	3	6	3	6	0	0
	FW	(Scotland) SCO	Willie McAulay	23	5	19	4	4	1
	GK	(Scotland) SCO	Rab Macfarlane	25	0	21	0	4	0
	FW	(Scotland) SCO	Roddy McKay	1	0	1	0	0	0
	DF	(Scotland) SCO	Jimmy Mackie	5	1	5	1	0	0
	DF	(Scotland) SCO	Duncan McNichol (c)	22	0	19	0	3	0
	FW	(Scotland) SCO	George McNicol	15	5	14	5	1	0
	DF	(Scotland) SCO	Robert Murray	23	0	20	0	3	0
	FW	(Scotland) SCO	George Ritchie (c)	17	3	13	2	4	1
	MF	(Scotland) SCO	Gowie Robertson	2	0	1	0	1	0
	FW	(Scotland) SCO	Jimmy Robertson	22	4	18	1	4	3
	FW	(Scotland) SCO	Tom Ruddiman	15	10	11	7	4	3
	MF	(Scotland) SCO	John Sangster	2	0	2	0	0	0
	DF	(Scotland) SCO	Tom Strang	24	1	20	0	4	1
	DF	(Scotland) SCO	Sam Willox	2	0	2	0	0	0
