= 1903–04 Aberdeen F.C. season =

Aberdeen F.C.
1903–04 season
- Chairman: Alexander Milne
- Manager: Jimmy Philip
- Northern League: 3rd
- Scottish Cup: First Round
- Top goalscorer: League: Willie McAulay (13); All: Willie McAulay (13)
- Highest home attendance: 8,000 vs. Stenhousemuir, 15 August 1903
- Lowest home attendance: 2,000 vs. Dundee 'A', 30 January 1904
Home colours

Aberdeen F.C. competed in the Northern League and Scottish Cup in the 1903–04 season.

== Overview ==
It was Aberdeen's first season in Scottish football, the club having been established in April 1903 following a merger of three local clubs, Orion, Victoria United and the original Aberdeen F.C. The new club failed to gain election to Division One of the Scottish Football League and did not apply to join Division Two. They were placed in the Northern League along with eleven other clubs from the north of Scotland. The club finished third in the league, but lost their first Scottish Cup tie to Alloa Athletic.

== Results ==
=== Northern League ===
Match Day	Date	Opponent	H/A	Score	Aberdeen Scorer(s)	Attendance
1	15 August	Stenhousemuir	H	1–1	MacAulay	8,000
2	22 August	Dunfermline Athletic	A	2–4	Own goal, D. MacKay	3,500
3	29 August	St Johnstone	H	5–1	Shinner (2), D. MacKay (2), MacAulay	7,000
4	12 September	Stenhousemuir	A	1–1	Shinner	4,000
5	26 September	Arbroath	H	1–2	Shinner	6,000
6	10 October	Dundee Wanderers	A	2–0	Johnston, C. Mackie	2,000
7	24 October	Cowdenbeath	A	1–3	MacAulay	3,000
8	31 October	Forfar Athletic	H	3–1	MacAulay, D. MacKay, C. Mackie	4,000
9	7 November	Dundee Wanderers	H	2–2	D. MacKay, Johnston	2,500
10	14 November	Montrose	H	4–2	Low (2), MacAulay (2)	4,500
11	21 November	Montrose	A	1–4	D. MacKay	1,000
12	28 November	Lochgelly United	H	8–1	Low, Barron, C. Mackie (3), MacAulay, Johnston (2)	5,000
13	5 December	Dunfermline Athletic	A	0–1		5,500
14	12 December	Forfar Athletic	A	6–2	Shinner, Wishart, C. Mackie, MacAulay (2), Johnston	2,000
15	26 December	Lochee United	A	3–0	Sangster, MacAulay, Johnston	1,000
16	2 January	Dundee 'A'	A	1–1	MacAulay	3,500
17	30 January	Dundee 'A'	H	2–1	Low, MacAulay	2,000
18	6 February	Cowdenbeath	H	3–2	Low, D. MacKay, Barron	2,500
19	20 February	Lochee United	H	4–0	C. Mackie (2), D. MacKay, Shinner	2,000
20	19 March	Arbroath	A	1–4	Strang	1,500
21	22 April	St Johnstone	A	3–1	C. Mackie, MacAulay, Shiach	2,000
22	23 April	Lochgelly United	A	1–3	D. MacKay	1,000

==== Final league table ====
Pos	Team	Pld	W	D	L	GF	GA	GD	Pts
1	Montrose	22	16	0	6	54	25	+29	32
2	Arbroath	22	11	6	5	43	45	−2	28
3	Aberdeen	22	11	4	7	55	37	+18	26
4	Dundee Wanderers	22	10	5	7	45	35	+10	25

=== Scottish Cup ===
Round	Date	Opponent	H/A	Score	Aberdeen Scorer(s)	Attendance
R1	23 January	Alloa Athletic	A	1–2	C. Mackie	2,500

== Squad ==
=== Appearances and goals ===
No.	Pos	Nat	Player	Total		Northern League		Scottish Cup	
No.	Pos	Nat	Player	Apps	Goals	Apps	Goals	Apps	Goals
	GK	(Scotland) SCO	Frank Barrett	20	0	19	0	1	0
	FW	(Scotland) SCO	John Barron	6	2	5	2	1	0
	FW	(Scotland) SCO	John Bonnar	5	0	4	0	1	0
	FW	(Scotland) SCO	Martin Dorward	1	0	1	0	0	0
	DF	(Scotland) SCO	John Hannah	1	0	1	0	0	0
	FW	(Scotland) SCO	WG Johnston	20	6	19	6	1	0
	DF	(Scotland) SCO	Harry Low	18	5	17	5	1	0
	FW	(Scotland) SCO	Dave MacKay	15	9	15	9	0	0
	FW	(Scotland) SCO	Roddy McKay	1	0	1	0	0	0
	FW	(Scotland) SCO	Charlie Mackie	22	10	21	9	1	1
	FW	(Scotland) SCO	Jimmy Mackie	10	0	9	0	1	0
	FW	(Scotland) SCO	Willie McAulay (c)	21	13	20	13	1	0
	DF	(Scotland) SCO	Frank McGregor	14	0	14	0	0	0
	DF	(Scotland) SCO	Duncan McNichol	17	0	16	0	1	0
	DF	(Scotland) SCO	Jack Murphy	1	0	1	0	0	0
	FW	(Scotland) SCO	Tom Owen	2	0	2	0	0	0
	DF	(Scotland) SCO	Robert Ritchie	12	0	12	0	0	0
	GK	(Scotland) SCO	Willie Ritchie	3	0	3	0	0	0
	DF	(Scotland) SCO	Gowie Robertson	4	0	4	0	0	0
	DF	(Scotland) SCO	John Sangster	12	1	11	1	1	0
	FW	(Scotland) SCO	Alex Shiach	4	1	4	1	0	0
	FW	(England) ENG	Bert Shinner	14	6	14	6	0	0
	FW	(Scotland) SCO	Tom Strang	21	1	20	1	1	0
	DF	(Scotland) SCO	Johnny Thomson	1	0	1	0	0	0
	DF	(Scotland) SCO	Sam Willox	6	0	6	0	0	0
	FW	(Scotland) SCO	John Wishart	2	1	2	1	0	0

== Transfers ==
=== Players in ===
Date	Pos	Player	From	Fee	DOB	DOD
4 May 1903	FW	(Scotland) Willie McAulay	(England) Middlesbrough	N/A	1 November 1879	1935 (aged 55-56)
8 June 1903	DF	(Scotland) Frank McGregor	N/A	N/A	N/A	N/A
9 June 1903	DF	(Scotland) Tom Strang	(England) Bolton Wanderers	N/A	20 October 1881	17 August 1947 (aged 65)
10 June 1903	GK	(Scotland) Willie Ritchie	N/A	N/A	N/A	N/A
10 June 1903	DF	(Scotland) Robert Ritchie	N/A	N/A	24 March 1876	26 April 1950 (aged 74)
13 June 1903	FW	(Scotland) Charlie Mackie	(Scotland) Aberdeen F.C.	N/A	9 May 1880	N/A
17 June 1903	DF	(Scotland) Jack Murphy	(Scotland) Aberdeen F.C.	N/A	N/A	N/A
18 June 1903	DF	(Scotland) Sam Willox	(Scotland) Orion F.C.	N/A	12 August 1881	1 April 1950 (aged 68)
18 June 1903	FW	(Scotland) Dave Mackay	N/A	N/A	N/A	N/A
18 June 1903	FW	(Scotland) Alex Shiach	(Scotland) Aberdeen F.C.	N/A	26 December 1879	1921 (aged 41 or 42)
20 June 1903	DF	(Scotland) John Sangster	(Scotland) Aberdeen F.C.	N/A	4 May 1880	N/A
28 June 1903	FW	(Scotland) WG Johnston	N/A	N/A	N/A	N/A
2 July 1903	DF	(Scotland) Harry Low	(Scotland) Orion F.C.	N/A	15 August 1882	26 September 1920 (aged 38)
15 July 1903	GK	(Scotland) Frank Barrett	(Scotland) Dundee	N/A	2 August 1872	22 March 1907 (aged 34)
30 July 1903	FW	(Scotland) Jimmy Mackie	(Scotland) Aberdeen F.C.	N/A	19 August 1878	8 February 1913 (aged 34)
26 August 1903	FW	(England) Bert Shinner	(England) Middlesbrough	N/A	9 September 1877	10 November 1921 (aged 44)
22 September 1903	DF	(Scotland) Johnny Thomson	N/A	N/A	N/A	N/A
23 September 1903	DF	(Scotland) William Brebner	(Scotland) Aberdeen F.C.	N/A	3 November 1881	September 1942 (aged 60)
28 September 1903	DF	(Scotland) Duncan McNicol	(England) Woolwich Arsenal	N/A	16 January 1874	5 March 1949 (aged 75)
6 October 1903	FW	(Scotland) John Barron	(Scotland) Aberdeen F.C.	N/A	17 February 1879	24 July 1908 (aged 29)
30 October 1903	FW	(Scotland) Roddy McKay	(Scotland) Aberdeen F.C.	N/A	16 May 1885	N/A
12 November 1903	DF	(Scotland) Gowie Robertson	(Scotland) Aberdeen F.C.	£5	19 November 1879	27 July 1929 (aged 49)
4 December 1903	FW	(Scotland) Martin Dorward	N/A	N/A	N/A	N/A
18 December 1903	FW	(Scotland) Tom Owen	N/A	N/A	30 July 1881	N/A
December 1903	FW	(Scotland) John Wishart	N/A	N/A	N/A	N/A
16 January 1904	FW	(Scotland) John Bonnar	N/A	N/A	N/A	N/A
2 March 1904	DF	(Scotland) John Hannah	N/A	N/A	N/A	N/A
