= Alfred Ward =

Alfred or Alf Ward may refer to:

- Dudley Ward (British Army officer) (Alfred Dudley Ward, 1905–1991), British Army officer, governor of Gibraltar
- Alfred G. Ward (1908–1982), U.S. Navy admiral
- Alf Ward (1885–1926), English footballer
