= Wilf Low =

Scottish footballer

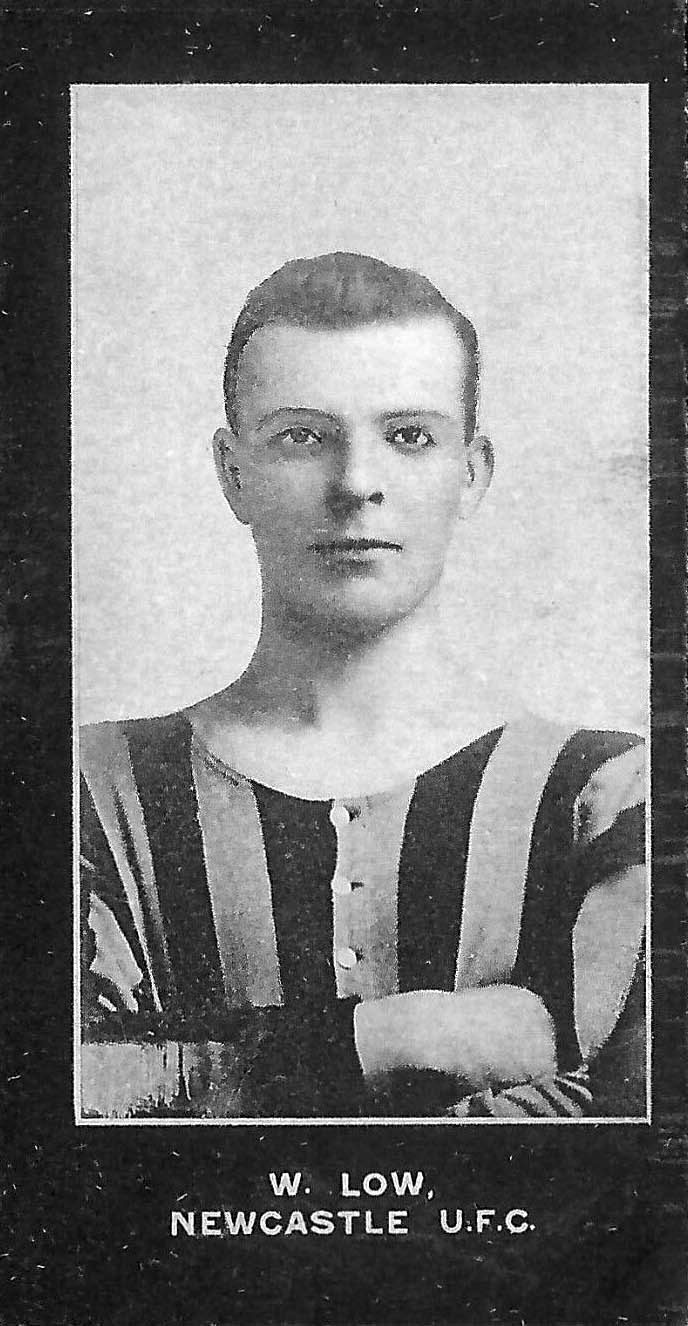

Personal information
- Full name: Wilfrid Lawson Low
- Date of birth: 8 December 1884
- Place of birth: Fraserburgh, Scotland
- Date of death: 30 April 1933 (aged 48)
- Place of death: Newcastle upon Tyne, England
- Height: 5 ft 11 in (1.80 m)
- Position: Centre half

Senior career*
Years	Team	Apps	(Gls)
- Abergeldie
- Montrose
1904–1909	Aberdeen	107	(3)
1909–1924	Newcastle United	324	(9)
Total		431	(12)

International career
1911–1920	Scotland	5	(0)
- * Club domestic league appearances and goals

Wilfrid Lawson Low (8 December 1884 – 30 April 1933) was a Scottish footballer who played as a centre-half for Aberdeen and Newcastle United.

Low was nicknamed the "Laughing Cavalier", although opposition forwards may have disagreed with this as he was a typical hard defender of that time. He played 367 games for Newcastle scoring 8 goals. He also played for the Scotland national team, winning five caps between 1911 and 1920.

Low remained with Newcastle after his playing retirement, firstly as a coach for the Swifts junior side, then latterly as the club's groundsman.

== Personal life ==
Low's brother Harry, nephew Willie and son Norman were also professional footballers. He served as a sergeant in the Royal Engineers at home during the First World War. He was killed in 1933 when a car knocked him over.

== Career statistics ==
=== Appearances and goals by club, season and competition ===
Club	Season	League			National Cup		Total	
Club	Season	Division	Apps	Goals	Apps	Goals	Apps	Goals
Aberdeen	1904-05	Scottish Division Two	4	0	1	0	5	0
Aberdeen	1905-06	Scottish Division One	13	0	1	0	14	0
Aberdeen	1906-07	Scottish Division One	29	0	2	0	31	0
Aberdeen	1907-08	Scottish Division One	29	1	6	0	35	1
Aberdeen	1908-09	Scottish Division One	32	2	2	0	34	2
Aberdeen	Total		107	3	12	0	119	3
Newcastle United	1909-10	First Division	23	0	8	0	31	0
Newcastle United	1910-11	First Division	31	1	8	0	39	1
Newcastle United	1911-12	First Division	35	3	1	0	36	3
Newcastle United	1912-13	First Division	31	2	8	0	39	2
Newcastle United	1913-14	First Division	34	2	1	0	35	2
Newcastle United	1914-15	First Division	35	0	7	0	42	0
Newcastle United	1915-16	Official English football disrupted by the First World War						
Newcastle United	1916-17	Official English football disrupted by the First World War						
Newcastle United	1917-18	Official English football disrupted by the First World War						
Newcastle United	1918-19	Official English football disrupted by the First World War						
Newcastle United	1919-20	First Division	38	0	2	0	40	0
Newcastle United	1920-21	First Division	34	0	4	0	38	0
Newcastle United	1921-22	First Division	29	1	2	0	31	1
Newcastle United	1922-23	First Division	24	0	2	0	26	0
Newcastle United	1923-24	First Division	10	0	0	0	10	0
Newcastle United	Total		324	9	43	0	367	9
Career total			431	12	55	0	486	12

=== International ===
Appearances and goals by national team and year
National team	Year	Apps	Goals
Scotland	1911	2	0
Scotland	1912	1	0
Scotland	1913	—	
Scotland	1914	—	
Scotland	1915	—	
Scotland	1916	—	
Scotland	1917	—	
Scotland	1918	—	
Scotland	1919	—	
Scotland	1920	2	0
Total		5	0

== Honours ==
Newcastle United

- FA Cup: 1909–10

== See also ==
- List of Newcastle United F.C. players
- List of Scottish football families

== Resources ==
- A Complete Who's Who of Newcastle United, by Paul Joannou
- Haway The Lads, The Illustrated Story of Newcastle United, by Paul Joannou, Tommy Canning/Patrick Canning
