= William Hartwell =

English footballer

Personal information
- Full name: William Hartwell
- Date of birth: 1885
- Place of birth: Northampton, Northamptonshire, England
- Height: 5 ft 6 in (1.68 m)
- Position: Forward

Senior career*
Years	Team	Apps	(Gls)
- Kettering Town
1904–1905	Manchester United	3	(0)
1905–?	Northampton Town		
- Peterborough United
- * Club domestic league appearances and goals

William Hartwell (born 1885) was an English footballer who played as a forward. Born in Northampton, Northamptonshire, he played for Kettering Town, Manchester United, Northampton Town and Peterborough United.

== Career ==
Hartwell joined Manchester United from Kettering Town in April 1904 at the age of 19, and made his debut in the final league game of the 1903–04 season against Leicester Fosse; however, he was injured during the match, which finished in a 5–2 win for United, and had to withdraw. He was injured again in pre-season ahead of the 1904–05 campaign, and did not make another appearance until December 1904, deputising for Harry Williams at outside left in a league game against Burton United. His final appearance for the club was in a 7–0 win over Bradford City, United's biggest win of the season. He was released at the end of the season and returned to his family home in Kettering. Despite failing to score for the club, United took maximum points from the matches Hartwell appeared in, with an aggregate score of 15–4. He later played for Northampton Town and Peterborough United.

== Career statistics ==
Appearances and goals by club, season and competition
Club	Season	League			Cup		Total	
Club	Season	Division	Apps	Goals	Apps	Goals	Apps	Goals
Manchester United	1903–04	Football League Second Division	1	0	—		1	0
Manchester United	1904–05	Football League Second Division	2	0	1	0	3	0
Total			3	0	1	0	4	0
