= Bobby Simpson (footballer, born 1888) =

English footballer

Personal information
- Full name: Robert Albert Simpson
- Date of birth: 1886
- Place of birth: Chorlton-cum-Hardy, England
- Date of death: 6 June 1948 (aged 61 or 62)
- Place of death: Aberdeen, Scotland
- Height: 5 ft 7 in (1.70 m)
- Position: Inside right

Senior career*
Years	Team	Apps	(Gls)
- Westburn (Aberdeen)
19??–1906	Victoria Wednesday		
1906–1910	Aberdeen	86	(28)
1910–1912	Bradford Park Avenue	53	(8)
1912–1913	Brighton & Hove Albion	30	(11)
- * Club domestic league appearances and goals

Robert Albert Simpson (1886 – 6 June 1948) was an English professional footballer, born in Chorlton-cum-Hardy, Lancashire, who played as a forward in the Scottish League for Aberdeen, in the Football League for Bradford Park Avenue, and in the Southern League for Brighton & Hove Albion.

His brother, J.J. Simpson, also played league football for Aberdeen.

== Career statistics ==
Club	Season	League			Scottish Cup		Total	
Club	Season	Division	Apps	Goals	Apps	Goals	Apps	Goals
Aberdeen	1905-06	Scottish Division One	0	0	0	0	0	0
Aberdeen	1906-07	Scottish Division One	10	1	0	0	10	1
Aberdeen	1907-08	Scottish Division One	22	7	0	0	22	7
Aberdeen	1908-09	Scottish Division One	24	10	1	1	25	11
Aberdeen	1909-10	Scottish Division One	30	10	3	1	33	11
Aberdeen	Total		86	28	4	2	90	30
