= Charles O'Hagan =

Irish association football player

Charlie O'Hagan
Personal information
- Full name: Charles O'Hagan
- Date of birth: 28 July 1881
- Place of birth: Buncrana, Ireland
- Date of death: 1 July 1931 (aged 49)
- Place of death: New York City, United States
- Height: 5 ft 9 in (1.75 m)
- Position: Inside left

Senior career*
Years	Team	Apps	(Gls)
1901–1902	St Columb's Court		
1902–1903	Derry Celtic		
1903–1904	Everton	0	(0)
1904–1906	Tottenham Hotspur	21	(5)
1906	Middlesbrough	5	(1)
1906–1910	Aberdeen	99	(22)
1910–1912	Morton	55	(22)
1912–1913	Third Lanark	5	(0)
Total		185	(50)

International career
1905–1909	Ireland	11	(2)

Managerial career
- 1920–1921: Norwich City
- 1923–1924: Sevilla
- * Club domestic league appearances and goals

Charles O'Hagan (28 July 1881 – 1 July 1931) was an Irish professional football player (an inside left) and manager.

He was the first Aberdeen player to be capped at international level for any team, making an appearance for Ireland in April 1907 (his sixth cap overall at that stage), a year before teammate Willie Lennie made his Scotland debut. He later served with the Leinster Regiment and Highland Light Infantry during the First World War.

O'Hagan was Norwich City's sixth manager, and was in charge for 21 matches between 1920 and 1921; his sides won 4 games, lost 8 and drew 9.

His nephew Willie O'Hagan, a goalkeeper, was also an Irish international.

== Career statistics ==
=== Club ===
Appearances and goals by club, season and competition
Club	Season	League			National Cup		Total	
Club	Season	Division	Apps	Goals	Apps	Goals	Apps	Goals
Everton	1903–04	First Division	0	0	0	0	0	0
Tottenham Hotspur	1904–05	Southern League	14	5	3	1	17	6
Tottenham Hotspur	1905–06	Southern League	7	0	–	–	–	–
Tottenham Hotspur	Total		21	5	-	-	36	7
Middlesbrough	1905–06	First Division	5	1	–	–	5+	1+
Aberdeen	1906–07	Scottish Division One	13	4	2	0	15	4
Aberdeen	1907–08	Scottish Division One	29	5	6	1	35	6
Aberdeen	1908–09	Scottish Division One	28	8	2	0	30	8
Aberdeen	1909–10	Scottish Division One	29	5	3	1	32	6
Aberdeen	Total		99	22	13	2	112	24
Greenock Morton	1910–11	Scottish Division One	–	–	–	–	–	–
Greenock Morton	1911–12	Scottish Division One	–	–	–	–	–	–
Greenock Morton	Total		55	22	-	-	55+	22+
Third Lanark	1912–13	Scottish Division One	5	0	–	–	5+	0+
Career total			185	50	13+	2+	198+	52+

=== International ===
Appearances and goals by national team and year
National team	Year	Apps	Goals
Ireland	1905	2	1
Ireland	1906	3	0
Ireland	1907	3	1
Ireland	1908	2	0
Ireland	1909	1	0
Total		11	2

Wales score listed first, score column indicates score after each O'Hagan goal

List of international goals scored by Charles O'Hagan
No.	Date	Venue	Cap	Opponent	Score	Result	Competition	Ref.
1	8 April 1905	Solitude, Belfast, Northern Ireland	2	Wales	2–2	2–2	1904–05 British Home Championship	
2	23 February 1907	Solitude, Belfast, Northern Ireland	7	Wales	1–0	3–2	1906–07 British Home Championship	

=== Managerial record ===
Team	From	To	Record				
Team	From	To	P	W	L	D	Win %
Norwich City	1920	1921	21	4	8	9	19.00%
Sevilla	1922	1923	–	–	–	–	–
