= Shinner =

Shinner may refer to:

- A pejorative term for a supporter of Sinn Féin, a political party in Ireland
  - Sometimes erroneously used as a term for the Irish Volunteers, due to their association with Sinn Féin
- Emily Shinner (1862–1901), English violinist
- James Shinner (1877–1921), English footballer
