= Stewart Davidson =

Scottish footballer

Personal information
- Full name: Stewart Davidson
- Date of birth: 1 June 1889
- Place of birth: Aberdeen, Scotland
- Date of death: 26 December 1960 (aged 71)
- Place of death: East Ham, England
- Height: 5 ft 10 in (1.78 m)
- Positions: Right half; outside right

Youth career
- Shamrock

Senior career*
Years	Team	Apps	(Gls)
1905–1913	Aberdeen	101	(1)
1913–1923	Middlesbrough	208	(4)
1917	→ Aberdeen (loan)	3	(0)
1923–1926	Aberdeen	32	(0)
1926–1927	Forres Mechanics		
Total		344	(5)

International career
1921	Scotland	1	(0)

Managerial career
- 1926–1931: Forres Mechanics
- 1932–1939: Kent F.A.
- * Club domestic league appearances and goals

Stewart Davidson (1 June 1889 – 26 December 1960) was a Scottish professional footballer who played as a right half for Aberdeen and Middlesbrough.

== Early and personal life ==
Davidson was born in Aberdeen on 1 April 1889. He worked as a legal clerk.

== Career ==
After playing for Aberdeen, Davidson was signed by Middlesbrough manager Tom Mcintosh on 17 April 1913 for a fee of £675. He played 76 league games across two seasons prior to the outbreak of World War One. During the war, Davidson played as a wartime guest player for Manchester City, and although wounded during the war, was able to continue his football career after the end of the war in 1918. He became Middlesbrough club captain in 1920, and earned his first and only cap for Scotland against England in 1921.

In summer 1923, Davidson was deemed surplus to requirements at Middlesbrough and returned to his former club Aberdeen. He was later player-manager of Forres Mechanics and coached for the Kent F.A., before became assistant manager to ex-teammate Billy Birrell at Chelsea from 1939 to 1957.

== Career statistics ==
=== Club ===
Appearances and goals by club, season and competition
Club	Season	League			Scottish Cup		Total	
Club	Season	Division	Apps	Goals	Apps	Goals	Apps	Goals
Aberdeen	1905–06	Scottish Division One	1	0	0	0	1	0
Aberdeen	1906–07	Scottish Division One	4	0	0	0	4	0
Aberdeen	1907–08	Scottish Division One	7	1	0	0	7	1
Aberdeen	1908–09	Scottish Division One	8	0	0	0	8	0
Aberdeen	1909–10	Scottish Division One	19	0	1	0	20	0
Aberdeen	1910–11	Scottish Division One	7	0	4	0	11	0
Aberdeen	1911–12	Scottish Division One	24	0	5	0	29	0
Aberdeen	1912–13	Scottish Division One	31	0	1	0	32	0
Aberdeen	Total		101	1	11	0	112	1
Middlesbrough	1913–14	First Division	30	1	1	0	31	1
Middlesbrough	1914–15	First Division	36	0	1	0	37	0
Middlesbrough	1915–16	Official English football disrupted by the First World War						
Middlesbrough	Total		66	1	2	0	68	1
Aberdeen (loan)	1916–17	Scottish Division One	3	0	-	-	3	0
Middlesbrough	1917–18	Official English football disrupted by the First World War						
Middlesbrough	1918–19	Official English football disrupted by the First World War						
Middlesbrough	1919–20	First Division	42	1	2	0	44	1
Middlesbrough	1920–21	First Division	37	0	1	0	38	0
Middlesbrough	1921–22	First Division	41	2	1	0	42	2
Middlesbrough	1922–23	First Division	22	0	2	0	24	0
Middlesbrough	Total		142	3	6	0	148	3
Aberdeen	1923–24	Scottish Division One	26	0	6	0	32	0
Aberdeen	1924–25	Scottish Division One	6	0	0	0	6	0
Aberdeen	1925–26	Scottish Division One	0	0	0	0	0	0
Aberdeen	Total		32	0	6	0	38	0
Aberdeen total			136	1	17	0	153	1
Middlesbrough total			208	4	8	0	216	4
Career total			344	5	25	0	369	5

=== International ===
Appearances and goals by national team and year
National team	Year	Apps	Goals
Scotland	1921	1	0
Total		1	0
