= 1908–09 Aberdeen F.C. season =

Aberdeen F.C.
1908–09 season
- Chairman: Thomas Duncan
- Manager: Jimmy Philip
- Scottish Football League Division One: 8th
- Scottish Cup: Second round
- Top goalscorer: League: Willie Lennie (12); All: Willie Lennie (14)
- Highest home attendance: 15,000 vs. Dundee, 24 October 1908
- Lowest home attendance: 4,000 vs. Hibernian, 3 April 1909

Aberdeen F.C. competed in the Scottish Football League Division One and the Scottish Cup in season 1908–09.

== Overview ==
This was Aberdeen's sixth season overall and fourth in the top flight. Aberdeen finished in eighth place in Division One and scored a club record 61 goals in 34 league games. In the Scottish Cup, they were knocked out in the second round by Third Lanark. Willie Lennie finished as top scorer with 14 goals in both competitions.

== Results ==
=== Scottish Division One ===
Match Day	Date	Opponent	H/A	Score	Aberdeen Scorer(s)	Attendance
1	15 August	St Mirren	H	4–2	Blackburn (2), Muir, McNair	8,000
2	22 August	Morton	H	2–0	O'Hagan, Lennie	7,500
3	29 August	Clyde	A	1–2	Muir	10,000
4	5 September	Rangers	H	0–2		9,000
5	12 September	Airdrieonians	H	2–0	McIntosh, Lennie	8,000
6	19 September	Hamilton Academical	A	2–1	McNair, Lennie	5,500
7	26 September	Kilmarnock	H	2–0	Simpson (2)	7,000
8	28 September	Queen's Park	H	1–1	Simpson	10,000
9	3 October	Falkirk	A	1–0	Low	7,000
10	10 October	Partick Thistle	A (Note: This game was played at Aberdeen's Pittodrie Stadium, despite Partick Thistle being the home team.)	3–2	Blackburn, Muir, Lennie	5,500
11	17 October	Hamilton Academical	H	4–2	Simpson, Muir, O'Hagan, Lennie	7,000
12	24 October	Dundee	H	1–1	Muir	15,000
13	31 October	Heart of Midlothian	A	1–1	O'Hagan	5,000
14	7 November	Falkirk	H	3–1	Simpson, O'Hagan, Lennie	8,000
15	14 November	Hibernian	A	1–2	O'Hagan	6,500
16	21 November	Port Glasgow Athletic	A	1–1	Blackburn	2,500
17	28 November	Motherwell	H	1–3	Lennie	6,000
18	5 December	Airdrieonians	A	2–4	Simpson, McNair	2,000
19	12 December	Dundee	A	2–2	McEchern, Lennie	14,000
20	19 December	Celtic	H	0–2		10,000
21	26 December	Queen's Park	A	2–2	Lennie (2)	10,000
22	1 January	Clyde	H	2–4	Wilson, Blackburn	8,000
23	2 January	Port Glasgow Athletic	H	3–1	T. Murray, Dalgarno (2)	7,000
24	9 January	Partick Thistle	H	1–0	Wilson	4,500
25	30 January	Third Lanark	H	6–1	Blackburn (2), T. Murray, O'Hagan (2), Lennie	5,500
26	13 February	Heart of Midlothian	H	1–0	Blackburn	6,000
27	20 February	Morton	A	3–2	Low, O'Hagan, Lennie	3,500
28	24 February	Celtic	A	0–2		6,000
29	27 February	Motherwell	A	2–3	Blackburn (2)	3,000
30	6 March	St Mirren	A	0–1		2,500
31	13 March	Kilmarnock	A	2–3	McEchern, Niblo	4,000
32	20 March	Third Lanark	A	0–2		2,500
33	27 March	Rangers	A	1–3	Simpson	10,500
34	3 April	Hibernian	H	4–0	Simpson (3), Niblo	4,000

==== Final standings ====
Pos	Team	Pld	W	D	L	GF	GA	GD	Pts
6	Hibernian	34	16	7	11	40	32	+8	39
7	St Mirren	34	15	6	13	53	45	+8	36
8	Aberdeen	34	15	6	13	61	53	+8	36
9	Kilmarnock	34	13	7	14	47	61	−14	33
10	Falkirk	34	13	7	14	58	56	+2	33

Source: "1908-1909 Division 1 - SPFL Archive". SPFL.

=== Scottish Cup ===
Round	Date	Opponent	H/A	Score	Aberdeen Scorer(s)	Attendance
R1	23 January	Morton	A	4–0	Wilson, Simpson, Niblo, Lennie	4,500
R2	6 February	Third Lanark	A	1–4	Lennie	13,300

== Squad ==
=== Appearances and goals ===
No.	Pos	Nat	Player	Total		Division One		Scottish Cup	
No.	Pos	Nat	Player	Apps	Goals	Apps	Goals	Apps	Goals
	FW	(Scotland) SCO	Rob Blackburn	24	10	22	10	2	0
	DF	(Scotland) SCO	Donald Colman (c)	36	0	34	0	2	0
	FW	(Scotland) SCO	Jimmy Dalgarno	5	2	5	2	0	0
	DF	(Scotland) SCO	Stewart Davidson	8	0	8	0	0	0
	DF	(Scotland) SCO	Alex Halkett (c)	19	0	19	0	0	0
	DF	(Scotland) SCO	Jock Hume	32	0	30	0	2	0
	GK	(Scotland) SCO	Arthur King	1	0	1	0	0	0
	FW	(Scotland) SCO	Willie Lennie	31	14	29	12	2	2
	MF	(Scotland) SCO	Wilf Low	34	2	32	2	2	0
	DF	(Scotland) SCO	JF Lyon	2	0	2	0	0	0
	FW	(Scotland) SCO	George MacFarlane	3	0	3	0	0	0
	FW	(Scotland) SCO	Vic McEchern	9	2	9	2	0	0
	MF	(Scotland) SCO	Jim Mcintosh	33	1	31	1	2	0
	FW	(Scotland) SCO	Willie McNair	15	3	15	3	0	0
	FW	(Scotland) SCO	Jim Muir	11	5	11	5	0	0
	FW	(Scotland) SCO	Herbert Murray	2	0	2	0	0	0
	FW	(Scotland) SCO	Tom Murray	7	2	6	2	1	0
	GK	(Scotland) SCO	Cody Mutch	33	2	33	2	0	0
	FW	(Scotland) SCO	Tom Niblo	15	3	13	2	2	1
	FW	(Ireland) EIR	Charlie O'Hagan	30	8	28	8	2	0
	FW	(Scotland) SCO	Bobby Simpson	25	11	24	10	1	1
	DF	(Scotland) SCO	George Wilson	19	3	17	2	2	1
