= 1904–05 in Scottish football =

Football in Scotland
- Season: 1904–05

1904–05 in Scottish football

Division One champions
- Celtic

Division Two champions
- Clyde

Scottish Cup winners
- Third Lanark

Junior Cup winners
- Ashfield

Scotland national team
- 1905 BHC

The 1904–05 season was the 32nd season of competitive football in Scotland and the 15th season of the Scottish Football League.

== League competitions ==
=== Scottish League Division One ===
Pos	Team	Pld	W	D	L	GF	GA	GD	Pts	Qualification or relegation
=1	Celtic (C)	26	18	5	3	68	31	+37	41	Champions
=1	Rangers	26	19	3	4	83	28	+55	41	
3	Third Lanark	26	14	7	5	60	28	+32	35	
4	Airdrieonians	26	11	5	10	38	45	−7	27	
5	Hibernian	26	9	8	9	39	39	0	26	
6	Partick Thistle	26	12	2	12	36	56	−20	26	
7	Heart of Midlothian	26	11	3	12	46	44	+2	25	
8	Dundee	26	10	5	11	38	32	+6	25	
9	Kilmarnock	26	9	5	12	29	45	−16	23	
10	St Mirren	26	9	4	13	33	36	−3	22	
11	Port Glasgow Athletic	26	8	5	13	30	51	−21	21	
12	Queen's Park	26	6	8	12	28	45	−17	20	
13	Morton	26	7	4	15	27	50	−23	18	
14	Motherwell	26	6	2	18	28	53	−25	14	

Source: SPFL Archive
(C) Champions

Celtic became the champions after a playoff victory against Rangers after the two teams finished level on points.

Champions: Celtic

The above table was slightly incorrect. Most reference books have the score for the game 19 November 1904 as Hearts 2 Port Glasgow Athletic 0. The actual score was 5–0. Report Therefore, Hearts should have 3 more goals and Port Glasgow 3 more in the against Column. Incorrect version that appears in most reference books.

Pos	Team	Pld	W	D	L	GF	GA	GD	Pts	Qualification or relegation
=1	Celtic (C)	26	18	5	3	68	31	+37	41	Champions
=1	Rangers	26	19	3	4	83	28	+55	41	
3	Third Lanark	26	14	7	5	60	28	+32	35	
4	Airdrieonians	26	11	5	10	38	45	−7	27	
5	Hibernian	26	9	8	9	39	39	0	26	
6	Partick Thistle	26	12	2	12	36	56	−20	26	
7	Heart of Midlothian	26	11	3	12	46	44	+2	25	
8	Dundee	26	10	5	11	38	32	+6	25	
9	Kilmarnock	26	9	5	12	29	45	−16	23	
10	St Mirren	26	9	4	13	33	36	−3	22	
11	Port Glasgow Athletic	26	8	5	13	30	51	−21	21	
12	Queen's Park	26	6	8	12	28	45	−17	20	
13	Morton	26	7	4	15	27	50	−23	18	
14	Motherwell	26	6	2	18	28	53	−25	14	

Source: SPFL Archive
(C) Champions

League Table from April 1905

=== Scottish League Division Two ===
Pos	Team	Pld	W	D	L	GF	GA	GD	Pts	Promotion or relegation
1	Clyde (C)	22	13	6	3	38	22	+16	32	
2	Falkirk (P)	22	12	4	6	32	25	+7	28	Promoted to the 1905–06 Scottish Division One
3	Hamilton Academical	22	12	3	7	40	24	+16	27	
4	Leith Athletic	22	10	4	8	36	26	+10	24	
5	Arthurlie	22	9	5	8	37	41	−4	23	
5	Ayr	22	11	1	10	46	37	+9	23	
7	Aberdeen (P)	22	7	7	8	36	26	+10	21	Promoted to the 1905–06 Scottish Division One
8	Albion Rovers	22	8	4	10	38	53	−15	20	
9	East Stirlingshire	22	7	5	10	37	38	−1	19	
9	Raith Rovers	22	9	1	12	30	34	−4	19	
11	Abercorn	22	8	1	13	31	45	−14	17	
12	St Bernard's	22	3	5	14	23	53	−30	11	

Source: statto.com
Rules for classification: Teams finish equal if level on points. Points system: 2 points for a win, 1 point for a draw, 0 points for a loss
(C) Champions; (P) Promoted

Two teams were promoted from Division Two this season, as next season's Division One capacity increased to sixteen teams.

== Other honours ==
=== Cup honours ===
==== National ====
Competition	Winner	Score	Runner-up
Scottish Cup	Third Lanark	3 – 1	Rangers
Scottish Qualifying Cup	Aberdeen	2 – 0	Renton
Scottish Junior Cup	Ashfield	2 – 1	Renfrew Victoria

==== County ====
Competition	Winner	Score	Runner-up
Aberdeenshire Cup	Aberdeen	3 – 2	Aberdeen Harp
Ayrshire Cup	Ayr	1 – 0	Kilmarnock
Border Cup	Peebles Rovers	3 – 2	Vale of Leithen
Dumbartonshire Cup	Vale of Leven	4 – 1	Renton
East of Scotland Shield	Hibernian	1 – 0 (Note: Second replay needed.)	Hearts
Fife Cup	Cowdenbeath	RR (Note: Group stage - round robin format.)	Raith Rovers
Forfarshire Cup	Dundee	w.o. (Note: Match awarded via walkover.)	Arbroath
Glasgow Cup	Celtic	2 – 1	Rangers
Lanarkshire Cup	Hamilton	3 – 0	Dykehead
Linlithgowshire Cup	Bathgate	3 – 2 (Note: Replay needed.)	Broxburn
North of Scotland Cup	Inverness Citadel	2 – 0	Clachnacuddin
Perthshire Cup	St Johnstone	3 – 1	Dunblane
Renfrewshire Cup	Morton	4 – 1 (Note: Aggregate over two legs.)	Arthurlie
Southern Counties Cup	Maxwelltown Volunteers	2 – 1	6th GRV
Stirlingshire Cup	Alloa Athletic	1 – 0	East Stirling

=== Non-league honours ===
Highland League

Top Three
Pos	Team	Pld	W	D	L	GF	GA	GD	Pts
1	Clachnacuddin	12	8	1	3	41	16	+25	17
2	Black Watch	12	6	5	1	19	10	+9	17
3	Inverness Thistle	12	7	2	3	19	12	+7	16

Source: SFHA

Other Senior Leagues

Division	Winner
Border Senior League	Peebles Rovers
Central League	King's Park
Eastern League	Hearts 'A'
Northern League	Dundee 'A'
Perthshire League	Scone
Scottish Combination	Beith

== Scotland national team ==
Date	Venue	Opponents	Score (Note: Scotland's score is shown first.)	Competition	Scotland scorer(s)
6 March 1905	Racecourse Ground, Wrexham (A)	Wales	1–3	BHC	John Tait Robertson
18 March 1905	Celtic Park, Glasgow (H)	Ireland	4–0	BHC	Charles Thomson (2), Bobby Walker, Jimmy Quinn
1 April 1905	Crystal Palace, London (A)	England	0–1	BHC	

Key:

- (H) = Home match
- (A) = Away match
- BHC = British Home Championship

Team	Pld	W	D	L	GF	GA	GD	Pts
England (C)	3	2	1	0	5	2	+3	5
Wales	3	1	1	1	6	6	0	3
Scotland	3	1	0	2	5	4	+1	2
Ireland	3	0	2	1	3	7	−4	2

Rules for classification: 1) points. The points system worked as follows: 2 points for a win and 1 point for a draw.
(C) Champions

== Other national teams ==
=== Scottish League XI ===
Date	Venue	Opponents	Score (Note: Scottish League XI's score is shown first.)	Scotland scorer(s)
11 March 1905	Hampden Park, Glasgow (H)	(England) Football League XI	2–3	Jimmy Quinn, Charles Thomson

== See also ==
- 1904–05 Aberdeen F.C. season
- 1904–05 Rangers F.C. season
