= Tom Strang =

Scottish footballer

Personal information
- Date of birth: 20 October 1881
- Place of birth: West Calder, Scotland
- Date of death: 17 August 1947 (aged 65)
- Place of death: Edinburgh, Scotland
- Position: Centre-half

Senior career*
Years	Team	Apps	(Gls)
- Celtic
1902–1903	Bolton Wanderers	3	(0)
1903–1907	Aberdeen	95	(3)
- * Club domestic league appearances and goals

Tom Strang (20 October 1881 – 17 August 1947) was a Scottish professional football who played as a Centre-half for Celtic, Bolton Wanderers and Aberdeen.

Strang was the first Aberdeen player to surpass 100 appearances and was the captain during the 1905–06 season. After retiring from football, Strang moved to Penicuik where he worked as a miner before he founded Strangs Football Pools around 1922. He later moved his business to Edinburgh where he would die in his home on 17 August 1947.

== Career statistics ==
Appearances and goals by club, season and competition
Club	Season	League			National Cup		Total	
Club	Season	Division	Apps	Goals	Apps	Goals	Apps	Goals
Bolton Wanderers	1902–03	First Division	3	0	0	0	3	0
Aberdeen	1903–04	Northern League	20	2	1	0	21	2
Aberdeen	1904–05	Scottish Division Two	20	0	3	0	23	0
Aberdeen	1905–06	Scottish Division One	30	1	2	1	32	2
Aberdeen	1906–07	Scottish Division One	25	0	2	0	27	0
Aberdeen	Total		95	3	8	1	103	4
