= Rab Macfarlane =

Scottish footballer (1876–1943)

Personal information
- Date of birth: 14 May 1876
- Place of birth: Greenock, Scotland
- Date of death: 27 July 1943 (aged 67)
- Position: Goalkeeper

Senior career*
Years	Team	Apps	(Gls)
–	Greenock Rosebery		
1894–1896	Morton	27	(0)
1896–1897	Third Lanark	14	(0)
1897–1898	Everton	9	(0)
1898–1899	Bristol St George's		
1899–1900	East Stirlingshire		
1900	New Brampton		
1900–1901	Grimsby Town	18	(0)
1901–1902	Celtic	17	(0)
1902–1904	Middlesbrough	18	(0)
1904–1909	Aberdeen	111	(0)
1909	Motherwell	4	(0)

International career
1896	Scotland	1	(0)
1897	Scottish League XI	1	(0)
- * Club domestic league appearances and goals

Robert Macfarlane (14 May 1876 – 27 July 1943) was a Scottish footballer who played as a goalkeeper for Morton, Third Lanark, Everton, East Stirlingshire, Bristol St George's, Grimsby Town, Celtic, Middlesbrough, Aberdeen, Motherwell and Scotland.

== Career statistics ==
=== Club ===
Appearances and goals by club, season and competition
Club	Season	League			Scottish Cup		Total	
Club	Season	Division	Apps	Goals	Apps	Goals	Apps	Goals
Greenock Morton	1894–95	Scottish Second Division	13	0	0	0	13	0
Greenock Morton	1895–96	Scottish Second Division	14	0	1	0	15	0
Greenock Morton	Total		27	0	1	0	28	0
Third Lanark	1896–97	Scottish Division One	14	0	1	0	15	0
Everton	1897–98	First Division	9	0	0	0	9	0
Bristol St George's	1898–99	Bristol and District League	-	-	-	-	-	-
East Stirlingshire	1899–00	Unelected	-	-	-	-	-	-
New Brompton	1899–00	Southern League / TMC	0	0	0	0	0	0
Grimsby Town	1900–01	Second Division	18	0	1	0	19	0
Celtic	1901–02	Scottish Division One	17	0	6	0	23	0
Middlesbrough	1902–03	First Division	18	0	1	0	19	0
Middlesbrough	1903–04	First Division	0	0	0	0	0	0
Middlesbrough	Total		18	0	1	0	19	0
Aberdeen	1904–05	Scottish Division One	21	0	3	0	24	0
Aberdeen	1905–06	Scottish Division One	30	0	2	0	32	0
Aberdeen	1906–07	Scottish Division One	31	0	2	0	33	0
Aberdeen	1907–08	Scottish Division One	29	0	4	0	33	0
Aberdeen	Total		111	0	11	0	122	0
Motherwell	1908–09	Scottish Division One	4	0	0	0	4	0
Career total			218+	0+	21+	0+	239+	0+

=== International ===
Appearances and goals by national team and year
National team	Year	Apps	Goals
Scotland	1896	1	0
Total		1	0
