= Harry Low =

Scottish footballer (1882–1920)

Personal information
- Full name: Henry Forbes Low
- Date of birth: 15 August 1882
- Place of birth: Oldmachar, Scotland
- Date of death: 26 September 1920 (aged 38)
- Place of death: Sunderland, England
- Height: 5 ft 8 in (1.73 m)
- Positions: Wing half; forward

Senior career*
Years	Team	Apps	(Gls)
1901–1903	Orion		
1903–1907	Aberdeen	95	(19)
1907–1919	Sunderland	202	(33)
Total		297	(52)
- * Club domestic league appearances and goals

Henry Forbes Low (15 August 1882 – 26 September 1920) was a Scottish professional footballer who made over 200 appearances in the Football League for Sunderland as a left half. He also played in the Scottish League for Aberdeen.

== Club career ==
A left half, Low began his senior career with newly-formed Northern League club Aberdeen and was a part of their rise from the Northern League to Scottish League Division One during the early years of the 20th century. He made 114 appearances and scored 30 goals during four seasons at Pittodrie and transferred to English First Division club Sunderland for a £400 fee in May 1907. Low played eight seasons for Sunderland, before the suspension of league football in 1915 (following the outbreak of the First World War) ended his competitive career with the club. During his time at Roker Park, Low made 228 appearances, scored 38 goals and was a part of the squad which won the 1912–13 First Division championship and reached the 1913 FA Cup Final.

== International career ==
Low played in the Home Scots v Anglo-Scots annual international trial matches in 1909 and 1911 and was called up by Scotland for a friendly match versus Ireland in 1913, but he pulled out of the squad in order to play in a 1912–13 FA Cup semi-final. He was not capped at international level.

== Personal life ==
Low was the elder brother of footballer Wilf Low and the uncle of Willie Low and Norman Low. In February 1917, 2 1/2 years after the outbreak of the First World War, Low enlisted in the Royal Navy as an able seaman. He served on HMS Dido and was honourably discharged after being wounded. Low became the landlord of a pub in Monkwearmouth in 1919 and died of pneumonia in September 1920. He was married with four children.

== Career statistics ==
Appearances and goals by club, season and competition
Club	Season	League			National cup (Note: Includes Scottish Cup, FA Cup)		Other		Total	
Club	Season	Division	Apps	Goals	Apps	Goals	Apps	Goals	Apps	Goals
Aberdeen	1903–04	Northern League	17	5	1	0	4 (Note: 3 appearances and 1 goal in Scottish Qualifying Cup, 1 appearance in Aberdeenshire Cup)	1	22	6
Aberdeen	1904–05	Scottish Division Two	21	2	2	1	4 (Note: 3 appearances and 3 goals in Scottish Qualifying Cup, 1 appearance in Fleming Charity Shield)	3	27	6
Aberdeen	1905–06	Scottish Division One	27	4	2	1	2 (Note: 1 appearance and 3 goals in Fleming Charity Shield, 1 appearance in High Cup)	3	31	8
Aberdeen	1906–07	Scottish Division One	30	8	2	1	2 (Note: 1 appearance in Fleming Charity Shield, 1 appearance in High Cup)	0	34	9
Aberdeen	Total		95	19	7	3	12	7	114	29
Sunderland	1907–08	First Division	30	2	1	0	0	0	31	2
Sunderland	1908–09	First Division	31	2	4	0	0	0	35	2
Sunderland	1909–10	First Division	24	12	3	2	0	0	27	14
Sunderland	1910–11	First Division	36	7	1	0	0	0	37	7
Sunderland	1911–12	First Division	8	5	2	1	0	0	10	6
Sunderland	1912–13	First Division	37	4	9	0	1 (Note: Appearance in Newcastle & Sunderland Hospitals Cup)	0	47	4
Sunderland	1913–14	First Division	22	1	5	0	0	0	27	1
Sunderland	1914–15	First Division	14	0	0	0	1	0	15	0
Sunderland	Total		202	33	25	3	2	0	229	36
Career total			297	52	32	6	14	7	343	65

== Honours ==
Aberdeen

- Aberdeenshire Cup: 1903–04
- Fleming Charity Cup: 1905–06, 1906–07

Sunderland

- Football League First Division: 1912–13
- Newcastle & Sunderland Hospitals Cup: 1912–13, 1914–15

== See also ==
- List of Scottish football families
- List of Sunderland A.F.C. players
