= Soldier Wilson =

Scottish footballer

- Wilson in 1905 with Leeds City F.C.

Personal information
- Full name: David Wilson
- Date of birth: 23 July 1883
- Place of birth: Musselburgh, Scotland
- Date of death: 27 October 1906 (aged 23)
- Place of death: Leeds, England
- Height: 5 ft 8 in (1.73 m)
- Position: Centre-forward

Senior career*
| Years | Team | Apps | (Gls) |
| 1902–1903 | Raith Rovers | 6 | (4) |
| 1903–1905 | Dundee | 23 | (11) |
| 1905 | Heart of Midlothian | 4 | (3) |
| 1905 | Hull City | 10 | (3) |
| 1905–1906 | Leeds City | 21 | (13) |
| Total | | 64 | (34) |
- * Club domestic league appearances and goals

David "Soldier" Wilson (also known as David Wood, David Wilson Wood and David Wood Wilson; 23 July 1883 – 27 October 1906) was a Scottish professional footballer who played as a centre forward. Born in Musselburgh, he earned his nickname as a teenager while serving with the Cameron Highlanders and the 1st Battalion, Black Watch. He also served in South Africa during the Boer War. After drawing attention with strong performances for the Black Watch F.C., he turned professional with Raith Rovers and went on to play for five professional clubs. Frequently the victim of injury during his short career, in October 1906 he suffered a heart attack while playing for Leeds City, and died in the West Stand at Elland Road.

== Confusion around identity ==
Due to the difficulty of accessing records of the late 19th century, and the ubiquity of the name David Wilson in this period, 20th-century histories of football often gave contrasting and inaccurate information about Soldier Wilson's biography. In Jarred and MacDonald's 1986 work Leeds United: A complete record, Wilson's place of birth is given as Hebburn in Northumberland, due to conflation with another David Wilson. This led to a confusion around his date of birth, which in some accounts of his life had him joining the army as an eight-year-old.

However, the advent of digitally-searchable records allowed Daniel Chapman, historian of Leeds United, to clarify the details of Wilson's life in his 2024 monograph, The Death and Life of David 'Soldier' Wilson. Based on the birth certificates of Wilson and Wood family members, contemporary press reports and UK census records, Chapman managed to conclusively identify Soldier Wilson as the David Wilson born in Musselburgh in 1883.

The confusion around Wilson's identity was compounded by Wilson's informal use of his adoptive father's surname, Wood. Contemporary documents exist referring to him as David Wilson, David Wood Wilson and David Wilson Wood. He may also have referred to himself on occasions as David Wood.

== Early life ==
Wilson was born at Hamilton Place, Musselburgh in 1883 to parents from Hawick; David Wilson, a gardener, and his wife Margaret Wilson (née Hardie). Wilson was one of five children, and upon the death of his mother in 1885, he was sent to live with his maternal aunt Agnes Wood and her husband David in Leith. According to an Edinburgh Evening News article published at the time of Wilson's death, he started Yardlands Public School in Leith in 1890. He went on as a teenager to represent the school successfully at football (playing as a back) and swimming. Chapman suggests it is likely that Wilson left school in 1898 at the age of 14.

Within a few years of leaving school, Wilson joined the Cameron Highlanders, playing for their football team while stationed in Gibraltar. He was later transferred to the Black Watch, and served in the Second Boer War. Wilson's regiment left South Africa at the end of hostilities in 1902, and he was stationed in Edinburgh.

== Career ==
Following an impressive performance playing at centre forward for the Black Watch against Kirkcaldy Amateurs, Wilson was signed by Raith Rovers, making his debut for them against St Bernard's in December 1902. In April 1903, Wilson left the Army and Raith to play as a professional with Scottish Football League Division One side Dundee. While playing for Dundee against Third Lanark in October 1903, he suffered a serious knee injury, which would require an operation to remove damaged cartilage the following February.

In February 1905, Wilson began a spell with Edinburgh club Heart of Midlothian. It was here that he gained the nickname "Soldier", which was employed to distinguish him from another player at the club, also named David Wilson. At Hearts, he played 16 times in all competitions, scoring 10.

At the start of the 1905–06 season, Wilson moved to England to join Football League Second Division side Hull City, for a fee of around £100. After scoring three goals in ten league matches, he was signed by Leeds City for a transfer fee of £150 in December 1905. During his first season at Leeds, Wilson made 15 league appearances and scored 13 goals, making him the club's top scorer in the 1905–06 campaign despite missing a large part of the season due to ankle and knee injuries. At the start of the 1906 season, Wilson went 5 games without a goal, provoking some criticism from fans who questioned the quality of the ambitious new Leeds club's transfer policy.

== Death ==
While playing for Leeds City against Burnley on 27 October 1906, Wilson left the pitch during the second half after suffering chest pains. When two of his teammates sustained injuries at the same time, he returned to the field of play against medical advice. However, he was unable to complete the match and had already departed the pitch when Burnley inside forward Arthur Bell scored a late winner for the visitors. Wilson collapsed and had to be carried to the Leeds dressing room where he died despite efforts to resuscitate him. A subsequent post mortem found that Wilson, a heavy smoker, had died from a heart attack.

The board of Leeds City paid for Wilson's funeral, which took place at Seafield Cemetery in Leith. His coffin was carried from the Griffin Hotel to Leeds New Station by six Leeds players.

Wilson's death provoked a debate in the press over violent play and professionalism on the football pitch.

== Personal life ==
Wilson married Sarah Nimmo, a childhood neighbour from Leith, on 31 October 1904. Their first daughter Annie was born in 1905, and another daughter, Davidina Wood Wilson, was born posthumously in March 1907.

Following Soldier Wilson's death, a series of collections and benefits at Leeds, and across England and Scotland, raised a substantial sum for Sarah and Annie.

== See also ==
- List of association footballers who died while playing
