= James Shinner =

English footballer

Personal information
- Full name: James Herbert Shinner
- Date of birth: 9 September 1877
- Place of birth: Dudley, England
- Date of death: 10 November 1921 (aged 44)
- Place of death: Spennymoor, England
- Positions: Centre forward; full back

Senior career*
Years	Team	Apps	(Gls)
- Dudley
1902–1903	Middlesbrough	0	(0)
1903–1904	Aberdeen	14	(6)
1904	Bradford City	4	(4)
1904–1905	Doncaster Rovers	12	(3)
1905	Brentford	7	(2)
1906–1907	Barrow		
1907–1908	Bristol City	0	(0)
1908–1909	Southend United	1	(0)
1909–1910	Watford	18	(0)
1910	Bristol City	0	(0)
1910–1912	Spennymoor United		
1912–1913	Spennymoor Wednesday		
- * Club domestic league appearances and goals

James Herbert Shinner (9 September 1877 – 10 November 1921), sometimes known as Bert Shinner, was an English professional footballer who played in the Football League for Doncaster Rovers and Bradford City as a centre forward and full back.

== Personal life ==
Shinner had three spells serving in the Royal Navy (1894–1902, 1903–1908), with a final spell as a minelayer between 2 August and 6 December 1916, during the First World War. He was later invalided out of the military, suffering from tuberculosis. Shinner worked as a poultry farmer during the last years of his life.

== Career statistics ==
Appearances and goals by club, season and competition
Club	Season	League			National cup (Note: Includes Scottish Cup, FA Cup)		Other		Total	
Club	Season	Division	Apps	Goals	Apps	Goals	Apps	Goals	Apps	Goals
Aberdeen	1903–04	Northern League	14	6	0	0	—		14	6
Brentford	1904–05	Southern League First Division	7	2	0	0	—		7	2
Watford	1909–10	Southern League First Division	18	0	0	0	4 (Note: Appearances in Southern Professional Charity Cup)	0	22	0
Career total			39	8	0	0	4	0	43	8
