= Tom Drain =

Scottish footballer

Personal information
- Date of birth: unknown
- Place of birth: Scotland
- Date of death: unknown
- Position: Centre half

Senior career*
Years	Team	Apps	(Gls)
1907–1908	Aberdeen	7	(0)
- Vale of Leven
1909	Blackpool	4	(0)
- * Club domestic league appearances and goals

Thomas Drain was a Scottish professional footballer. A centre half, he played in the Football League for Blackpool.
