= Willie Lennie =

Scottish footballer

Personal information
- Full name: William Lennie
- Date of birth: 26 January 1882
- Place of birth: Glasgow, Scotland
- Date of death: 23 August 1954 (aged 72)
- Place of death: Aberdeen, Scotland
- Position: Winger

Senior career*
Years	Team	Apps	(Gls)
- Maryhill
1901–1902	Queen's Park	6	(0)
1902–1903	Rangers	5	(2)
1903–1904	Dundee	16	(7)
1904–1905	Fulham	17	(3)
1905–1913	Aberdeen	228	(61)
1913–1914	Falkirk	15	(2)
1914–1915	St Johnstone	5	(2)
Total		292	(77)

International career
1908	Scotland	2	(1)
1910	Scottish League XI	1	(0)
- * Club domestic league appearances and goals

Willie Lennie (26 January 1882 – 23 August 1954) was a Scottish professional footballer who played for Queen's Park, Rangers, Dundee, Fulham and Aberdeen.

Lennie joined Aberdeen from Fulham in 1905 and spent eight years with the club, becoming the first Aberdeen player to play for Scotland in 1908.

== Career statistics ==
=== Club ===
Appearances and goals by club, season and competition
Club	Season	League			National Cup		Total	
Club	Season	Division	Apps	Goals	Apps	Goals	Apps	Goals
Queens Park	1901–02	Scottish Division One	6	0	3	1	9	1
Rangers	1901–02	Scottish Division One	0	0	0	0	0	0
Rangers	1902–03	Scottish Division One	5	2	0	0	5	2
Rangers	Total		5	2	0	0	5	2
Dundee	1903–04	Scottish Division One	16	7	5	1	21	8
Fulham	1904–05	SFL / WFL	17	3	0	0	17+	3+
Aberdeen	1905–06	Scottish Division One	29	6	2	0	31	6
Aberdeen	1906–07	Scottish Division One	31	9	2	0	33	9
Aberdeen	1907–08	Scottish Division One	31	10	6	1	37	11
Aberdeen	1908–09	Scottish Division One	29	12	2	1	31	13
Aberdeen	1909–10	Scottish Division One	31	8	3	1	34	9
Aberdeen	1910–11	Scottish Division One	27	7	4	0	31	7
Aberdeen	1911–12	Scottish Division One	28	7	5	2	33	9
Aberdeen	1912–13	Scottish Division One	22	2	0	0	22	2
Aberdeen	Total		228	61	24	5	252	66
Falkirk	1913–14	Scottish Division One	15	2	-	-	15+	2+
St Johnstone	1914–15	Scottish Division Two	5	2	-	-	5+	2+
Career total			292	77	32+	7+	324+	84+

=== International ===
Appearances and goals by national team and year
National team	Year	Apps	Goals
Scotland	1908	2	1
Total		2	1

=== International goals ===
Scores and results list Scotland's goal tally first, score column indicates score after each Lennie goal

List of international goals scored by Willie Lennie
No.	Date	Venue	Opponent	Score	Result	Competition	Ref
1	7 March 1908	Dens Park, Dundee	Wales	2–1	2–1	1907–08 British Home Championship	
