= Allan Lawrie =

Scottish footballer

Personal information
- Full name: Gordon Allan Lawrie
- Date of birth: 24 May 1885
- Place of birth: Aberdeen, Scotland
- Date of death: 10 May 1915 (aged 29)
- Place of death: Ypres, Belgium
- Position: Forward

Senior career*
Years	Team	Apps	(Gls)
- Orion
1903–	Bon Accord Amateurs		
–1906	Shamrock		
1906–1908	Aberdeen	1	(0)
- → Harp
- * Club domestic league appearances and goals

Gordon Allan Lawrie (24 May 1885 – 10 May 1915) was a Scottish professional footballer who played in the Scottish League for Aberdeen as a forward.

== Personal life ==
Lawrie was born in Aberdeen, the son of John Lawrie and Jane Allan Lawrie. Soon after the outbreak of the First World War in August 1914, Lawrie enlisted as a private in the Queen's Own Cameron Highlanders. He was serving in 'D' Company, 2nd Battalion when he was killed in Flanders on 10 May 1915. He is commemorated on the Menin Gate.

== Career statistics ==
Appearances and goals by club, season and competition
Club	Season	League			Scottish Cup		Total	
Club	Season	Division	Apps	Goals	Apps	Goals	Apps	Goals
Aberdeen	1906–07	Scottish First Division	1	0	0	0	1	0
Career total			1	0	0	0	1	0
