= Alec Mackie (Scottish footballer) =

Scottish footballer

Personal information
- Positions: Inside right; centre forward

Senior career*
Years	Team	Apps	(Gls)
1899–1902	Raith Rovers		
1902–1905	Rangers	51	(24)
- * Club domestic league appearances and goals

Alexander Mackie was a Scottish footballer who played as an inside right or centre forward and featured for Rangers between 1902 and 1905.

== Career ==
Mackie was employed by HM Customs and this sometimes took precedence over his football career, which began at senior level in 1899 with Raith Rovers (initially with their Junior side, Raith Athletic). Though registered on amateur terms due to his business-related absences, he became an important member of the squad which won the Northern League to solidify the Kirkcaldy club's credentials for admission to the Scottish Football League in the summer of 1902, by which time Mackie had agreed to move on to join Rangers.

Mackie began the 1902–03 Scottish Division One campaign as a regular starter (usually at inside right as R.C. Hamilton was established in the centre forward role) but dropped out of the team in the December after a defeat by Dundee, and only played in two minor Inter-City League fixtures before returning to the line-up for the second replay of the 1903 Scottish Cup Final as a replacement for Johnny Walker, scoring in the victory over Heart of Midlothian.

Back in the side for the following campaign, with Hamilton missing through injury he played in a second Scottish Cup final in 1904, a defeat to Celtic Some revenge was gained when Mackie scored in a win over the same opponents in the final of the Glasgow Merchants Charity Cup a month later, but he ended up on the losing side in an Old Firm final again five months after that, this time in the Glasgow Cup (this was a period when the competitive rivalry between the two well-supported Glasgow clubs grew intensity due to the frequency of important matches between them).

Mackie kept his place for some months after the arrival of Archie Kyle and Bob McColl added further options for a Rangers forward line that already included the internationals Finlay Speedie, Alec Smith and Hamilton; his final appearance came in February 1905 when he suffered a fractured nose in a match against Port Glasgow Athletic – the injury was predicted to keep him out for a month, but he had no involvement in the 1905 Scottish Cup Final in April or the League Championship play-off in May (both were lost).

In August 1905 he was reinstated as an amateur but no further involvement at senior level was recorded for him after that fairly prominent spell at Ibrox, and in November 1906 he contacted the press to dispel rumours that he would return to football and confirmed that he would be concentrating fully on his business interests (a teammate, the defender Alex Fraser, made a similarly inconspicuous departure from the game around the same time).

Mackie took part in the annual Home Scots v Anglo-Scots international trial match in 1904, but is not recorded as having received any other representative honours.
