= Harry Williams (footballer, born 1883) =

English footballer

Harry Williams (born 1883) was an English footballer. His regular position was as a forward. He was born in Farnworth. He played for Bolton Wanderers, Burnley, Leeds City, and Manchester United.
