= Alex Fraser (Scottish footballer) =

Scottish footballer (1882–1950)

Personal information
- Full name: Alexander Currie Fraser
- Date of birth: 14 June 1882
- Place of birth: Dumbarton, Scotland
- Date of death: 25 January 1950 (aged 67)
- Place of death: Roodepoort, South Africa
- Position: Defender

Senior career*
Years	Team	Apps	(Gls)
- Clydebank Juniors
1902–1906	Rangers	43	(1)
- * Club domestic league appearances and goals

Alexander Currie Fraser (14 June 1882 – 25 January 1950) was a Scottish footballer who played mainly as a defender and featured for Rangers between 1902 and 1906.

== Career ==
A short time after joining Rangers from Clydebank Juniors, Fraser scored on his Scottish Football League debut against Morton in September 1902 as a makeshift right half (his only goal in the major competitions). At the end of that season the club won the Scottish Cup in 1903, in which Heart of Midlothian were defeated after two replays.

A frequent but not constant starter (he was involved in two-thirds of the league fixtures in the three campaigns he featured regularly), Fraser missed out on a place in the 1904 Scottish Cup Final, a defeat to Celtic, but did take part in a win over the same opponents in the final of the Glasgow Merchants Charity Cup a month later, only to finish on the losing side in an Old Firm final again five months after that, this time in the Glasgow Cup in the period when the competitive rivalry between the two clubs was intensifying.

More disappointment was to follow for Rangers at the end of that season as they lost the 1905 Scottish Cup Final to Third Lanark after a replay, then suffered another defeat to Celtic in a play-off for the 1904–05 Scottish Division One title, both having finished level on points.

At the start of the next season Fraser was injured against Kilmarnock and did not feature again until January 1906 in a defeat to St Mirren – this appears to have been an unsuccessful comeback attempt as it was reported that he "got injured somehow, and had to retire". That proved to be his final appearance for Rangers; in June 1906, it was stated that he had "almost completely recovered from the rather severe knee injury which troubled him so much last season" but a few days earlier it had been confirmed that his contract was not being renewed, and as with teammate Alec Mackie, it appears that he did not play for any senior club after that fairly prominent spell at Ibrox. He later emigrated to South Africa.
