= James McIntosh (footballer, born 1886) =

Scottish footballer

Personal information
- Full name: James Boyd McIntosh
- Date of birth: 25 May 1886
- Place of birth: Glasgow, Scotland
- Date of death: 18 April 1963 (aged 76)
- Place of death: Glasgow, Scotland
- Height: 5 ft 9 in (1.75 m)
- Position: Centre half

Senior career*
Years	Team	Apps	(Gls)
- Petershill
1904–1907	Glasgow Perthshire		
1907	Third Lanark	0	(0)
1907–1909	Aberdeen	63	(0)
1909–1910	Celtic	8	(0)
1910–1914	Hull City	94	(2)
1916–1918	Heart of Midlothian	23	(0)
1918–1919	Dumbarton	5	(0)
- * Club domestic league appearances and goals

James Boyd McIntosh (25 May 1886 – 18 April 1963) was a Scottish footballer who played for Third Lanark, Aberdeen, Celtic, Hull City, Hearts and Dumbarton.
