= 1917–18 in English football =

Football in England
- Season: 1917–18

The 1917–18 season was the third season of special wartime football in England during the First World War.

== Overview ==
Between 1915 and 1919 competitive football was suspended in England. Many footballers signed up to fight in the war and as a result many teams were depleted, and fielded guest players instead. The Football League and FA Cup were suspended and in their place regional league competitions were set up; appearances in these tournaments do not count in players' official records.

== Honours ==
There were four regional leagues. The Football League Lancashire and Midland sections were split into a principal tournament, consisting of a single league, and then a subsidiary tournament of four groups.

Competition	Principal Tournament winner	Subsidiary Tournament winner(s)
Football League (Lancashire Section)	Stoke	Liverpool (Group A); Manchester City (Group B); Preston North End (Group C); Bolton Wanderers (Group D)
Football League (Midland Section)	Leeds City	Grimsby Town (Group A); Notts County (Group B); The Wednesday (Group C); Leeds City (Group D)
London Combination	Chelsea	n/a
Bristol County Combination	Bristol City	n/a

A championship playoff was held between Stoke and Leeds City, which Leeds won 2–1 on aggregate.

== See also ==
- England national football team results (unofficial matches)
