= Charles Mackie (Scottish footballer) =

Scottish footballer

Personal information
- Full name: Charles Mackie
- Date of birth: 1882
- Place of birth: Peterhead, Scotland
- Date of death: Unknown
- Height: 5 ft 11 in (1.80 m)
- Position: Centre forward

Senior career*
Years	Team	Apps	(Gls)
- Peterhead
1903–1904	Aberdeen	21	(9)
1904–1905	Manchester United	5	(3)
1905	West Ham United	10	(3)
1905–1906	Aberdeen	6	(1)
1906–?	Lochgelly United		
- * Club domestic league appearances and goals

Charles Mackie (1882 – ?) was a Scottish footballer who played as a forward. Born in Peterhead, he played for Aberdeen, where he had two spells, and in England with Manchester United of the English Football League and West Ham United of the Southern League.
