= Alf Ward =

English footballer

Personal information
- Full name: Alfred Ward
- Date of birth: 1885
- Place of birth: Eastwood, Nottinghamshire, England
- Date of death: August 1926 (aged 40–41)
- Place of death: Burton-on-Trent, England
- Height: 5 ft 10 in (1.78 m)
- Position: Outside forward

Youth career
- Clowne White Star

Senior career*
Years	Team	Apps	(Gls)
1903–1904	Notts County	7	(0)
1904–1905	Brighton & Hove Albion	3	(0)
1905–1907	Aberdeen	26	(10)
1907–1908	Bradford Park Avenue		
1908–1909	Southampton	4	(2)
- * Club domestic league appearances and goals

Alfred Ward (1885 – August 1926) was an English footballer who played as an outside-forward for various clubs in the 1900s.

== Football career ==
Ward was born in Eastwood, Nottinghamshire and played as a youth for the village team at nearby Clowne, from where he joined Notts County of the Football League First Division in October 1903.

He made eight first-team appearances for Notts County before moving to the south coast to join Brighton & Hove Albion of the Southern League in May 1904. The following summer, he moved to Scotland to join Aberdeen, who had just been elected to join an expanded Scottish Football League First Division.

Ward spent two seasons at Pittodrie, in both of which the "Dons" finished 12th in the league. He then returned to England in 1907, to join Bradford Park Avenue who, despite being based in Yorkshire, had been elected to join the Southern League. The following summer, he returned to the south coast to join another Southern League club, Southampton.

He joined the "Saints" 1908 summer tour of Europe; at Leipzig, in the final match of the tour, Ward displaced the cartilage of his right knee. On his return to England, he underwent three operations on his knee in an effort to repair the injury. By January 1909, he had recovered sufficiently to make his league debut in place of Frank Jefferis, when he scored the only goal in a 1–0 victory over Brentford. Still troubled with his knee, he only managed three further first-team matches before deciding to retire in the summer of 1909.

Ward died in Burton-on-Trent, Staffordshire, in August 1926.
