= Alex Halkett =

Scottish footballer

Personal information
- Full name: Alexander Laing Halkett
- Date of birth: 25 September 1881
- Place of birth: Dunfermline, Scotland
- Date of death: 21 February 1917 (aged 35)
- Place of death: Pas-de-Calais, France
- Height: 5 ft 6 in (1.68 m)
- Position: Right half

Senior career*
Years	Team	Apps	(Gls)
- Parkmore
–1899	Dundee Violet		
1899–1904	Dundee	16	(0)
1904–1909	Aberdeen	116	(2)
- Reading
1909–1910	Portsmouth		
1910–1911	Forfar Athletic		
1911–1913	St Johnstone	41	(3)
1913	Breadalbane		
- * Club domestic league appearances and goals

Alexander Laing Halkett (25 September 1881 – 21 February 1917), sometimes known as Ecky Halkett or Alick Halkett, was a Scottish professional footballer who played in the Scottish League for Aberdeen, Dundee and St Johnstone as a right half.

== Personal life ==
Halkett's older brother John was also a footballer. Prior to his enlistment as a gunner in the Royal Field Artillery during the First World War, he worked as a wheelwright at Royal Naval Dockyard Rosyth. Halkett was killed in action in Pas-de-Calais, France on 21 February 1917 and was buried in Sailly-au-Bois Military Cemetery.

== Career statistics ==
Appearances and goals by club, season and competition
Club	Season	League			Scottish Cup		Other		Total	
Club	Season	Division	Apps	Goals	Apps	Goals	Apps	Goals	Apps	Goals
Dundee	1901–02	Scottish Division One	1	0	0	0	—		1	0
Dundee	1902–03	Scottish Division One	2	0	2	0	—		4	0
Dundee	1903–04	Scottish Division One	13	0	3	0	—		16	0
Dundee	Total		16	0	5	0	—		21	0
Aberdeen	1904–05	Scottish Division Two	16	1	2	0	8 (Note: Appearances in Scottish Qualifying Cup)	0	26	1
Aberdeen	1905–06	Scottish Division One	22	0	2	0	1 (Note: Appearance in Inter City Cup)	0	25	0
Aberdeen	1906–07	Scottish Division One	30	0	2	0	1 (Note: Appearance in Fleming Charity Shield)	0	33	0
Aberdeen	1907–08	Scottish Division One	29	1	6	0	1 (Note: Appearance in High Cup)	0	36	1
Aberdeen	1908–09	Scottish Division One	19	0	0	0	5 (Note: 4 appearances in North East Cup, 1 appearance in Robertson Cup)	0	24	0
Aberdeen	Total		116	2	12	0	16	0	144	2
St Johnstone	1911–12	Scottish Division Two	18	0	5	0	—		23	0
St Johnstone	1912–13	Scottish Division Two	23	3	7	0	—		30	3
St Johnstone	Total		41	3	12	0	—		53	3
Career total			173	5	29	0	16	0	218	5

== Honours ==
Aberdeen

- Scottish Qualifying Cup: 1904–05
- Fleming Charity Shield: 1906–07
