= 1949–50 Aberdeen F.C. season =

Aberdeen F.C.
1949–50 season
- Chairman: William Mitchell
- Manager: Dave Halliday
- Scottish League Division One: 11th place
- Scottish Cup: Finalist
- Scottish League Cup: Group Stage
- Top goalscorer: League: Harry Yorston (10 goals); All: Harry Yorston (17 goals)
- Highest home attendance: 43,000 vs. Rangers, 3 September
- Lowest home attendance: 8,000 vs. Partick Thistle, 12 November vs. Stirling Albion, 22 April
Home colours

The 1949–50 season was Aberdeen's 38th season in the top flight of Scottish football and their 39th season overall. Aberdeen competed in the Scottish League Division One, Scottish League Cup, and the Scottish Cup.

== Results ==
=== Division A ===
Match Day	Date	Opponent	H/A	Score	Aberdeen Scorer(s)	Attendance
1	10 September	St Mirren	H	2–3	Emery, Kelly (penalty)	17,000
2	17 September	Clyde	H	1–1	Stenhouse	18,000
3	24 September	Dundee	H	2–2	Kelly (2)	23,000
4	1 October	Hibernian	A	0–2		25,000
5	8 October	Third Lanark	H	2–1	Yorston (2)	18,000
6	15 October	Celtic	A	2–4	Kelly, Rice	30,000
7	22 October	Clyde	A	1–0	Kelly	14,500
8	29 October	Rangers	H	1–3	Hamilton	40,000
9	5 November	Falkirk	A	0–1		12,000
10	12 November	Partick Thistle	H	3–1	Yorston (2), Baird	8,000
11	19 November	Stirling Albion	A	1–0	Hamilton	15,000
12	26 November	Raith Rovers	H	3–0	Hamilton (2), Hather	16,000
13	3 December	Heart of Midlothian	A	1–4	Hather	23,000
14	10 December	Queen of the South	A	0–1		7,000
15	17 December	Motherwell	H	5–0	Yorston (2), Kiddie, Harris	15,000
16	24 December	St Mirren	A	0–4		7,000
17	31 December	East Fife	H	1–2	Yorston	17,000
18	2 January	Dundee	A	1–1	Pearson	23,000
19	3 January	Hibernian	H	0–3		15,000
20	7 January	Third Lanark	A	1–3	Emery	12,000
21	14 January	Cetic	H	4–0	Baird, Pearson, Hather, Emery (penalty)	25,000
22	4 February	Rangers	A	2–2	Hamilton, Yorston	50,000
23	18 February	Partick Thistle	A	2–0	Yorston, Hamilton	25,000
24	4 March	Raith Rovers	A	2–1	Baird, Hamilton	10,000
25	18 March	Queen of the South	H	2–0	Hamilton, Baird	12,000
26	25 March	Motherwell	A	1–5	Emery	7,000
27	1 April	Falkirk	H	1–2	Pearson	12,000
28	8 April	Heart of Midlothian	H	0–5	Hamilton	16,500
29	14 April	East Fife	A	1–4	Hather	5,500
30	22 April	Stirling Albion	H	6–2	Hather (2), Emery (penalty), Yorston, Baird	8,000

==== Final standings ====
Pos	Team	Pld	W	D	L	GF	GA	GD	Pts
6	Dundee	30	12	7	11	49	46	+3	31
7	Partick Thistle	30	13	3	14	55	45	+10	29
8	Aberdeen	30	11	4	15	48	56	−8	26
9	Raith Rovers	30	9	8	13	45	54	−9	26
10	Motherwell	30	10	5	15	53	58	−5	25

Source: RSSSF

=== Scottish League Cup ===
==== Group 1 ====
Round	Date	Opponent	H/A	Score	Aberdeen Scorer(s)	Attendance
1	13 August	St Mirren	A	1–3	Kelly	25,000
2	17 August	Celtic	H	4–5	Emery, Yorston, Kelly, Harris	40,000
3	20 August	Rangers	A	2–4	Harris, Emery	50,000
4	27 August	St Mirren	H	1–0	Yorston	22,000
5	31 August	Celtic	H	3–1	Pearson, Kelly, Yorston	15,000
6	3 September	Rangers	H	1–1	Emery	43,000

==== Group 1 final table ====
Team	Pld	W	D	L	GF	GA	GR	Pts
Rangers	6	3	2	1	15	8	1.875	8
Celtic	6	3	0	3	13	13	1.000	6
Aberdeen	6	2	1	3	12	14	0.857	5
St Mirren	6	2	1	3	7	12	0.583	5

=== Scottish Cup ===
Round	Date	Opponent	H/A	Score	Aberdeen Scorer(s)	Attendance
R1	28 January	St Mirren	A	2–1	Yorston (2), Baird, Delaney	20,000
R2	11 February	Heart of Midlothian	H	3–1	Emery, Pearson, Hamilton	42,000
R3	25 February	Celtic	A	1–0	Anderson	65,000
QF	11 March	Queen of the South	A	3–3	Yorston (2), Pearson	12,000
QF R	15 March	Queen of the South	H	1–2	Hamilton	32,000

== Squad ==
=== Appearances & Goals ===
No.	Pos	Nat	Player	Total		Division One		Scottish Cup		League Cup	
No.	Pos	Nat	Player	Apps	Goals	Apps	Goals	Apps	Goals	Apps	Goals
	GK	(Scotland) SCO	Frank Watson	23	0	18	0	5	0	0	0
	GK	(Scotland) SCO	Johnny Curran	16	0	10	0	0	0	6	0
	GK	(Scotland) SCO	Fred Martin	2	0	2	0	0	0	0	0
	DF	(Wales) WAL	Don Emery (c)	40	9	29	5	5	1	6	3
	DF	(Scotland) SCO	Pat McKenna	39	0	28	0	5	0	6	0
	DF	(Scotland) SCO	Ralph McKenzie	18	0	10	0	5	0	3	0
	DF	(Scotland) SCO	Willie Waddell	13	0	11	0	0	0	2	0
	DF	(Scotland) SCO	Willie Roy	7	0	4	0	0	0	3	0
	DF	(Republic of Ireland) IRL	Tony McKeown	2	0	2	0	0	0	0	0
	DF	??	Johnny Bruce	2	0	2	0	0	0	0	0
	DF	(Scotland) SCO	Armour Ashe	1	0	1	0	0	0	0	0
	DF	??	Sid Pacione	0	0	0	0	0	0	0	0
	MF	(Scotland) SCO	Chris Anderson	40	1	29	0	5	1	6	0
	MF	(Scotland) SCO	Tony Harris	39	3	28	1	5	0	6	2
	MF	(Scotland) SCO	Tommy Pearson	31	6	20	3	5	2	6	1
	MF	(Scotland) SCO	Jimmy Stenhouse	14	1	9	1	5	0	0	0
	MF	(Scotland) SCO	Peter Rice	10	1	7	1	0	0	3	0
	MF	(Scotland) SCO	Alex Kiddie	8	1	5	1	0	0	3	0
	MF	(Scotland) SCO	Willie Rob	4	0	4	0	0	0	0	0
	MF	(Scotland) SCO	Archie Glen	3	0	1	0	0	0	2	0
	MF	(Scotland) SCO	Willie Millar	3	0	3	0	0	0	0	0
	MF	(Scotland) SCO	Eric Bakie	2	0	2	0	0	0	0	0
	MF	(Scotland) SCO	Jim Chalmers	2	0	2	0	0	0	0	0
	MF	(Scotland) SCO	Kenny Thomson	2	0	2	0	0	0	0	0
	MF	(England) ENG	Ken Findlay	0	0	0	0	0	0	0	0
	MF	(Scotland) SCO	George Merchant	0	0	0	0	0	0	0	0
	MF	(Scotland) SCO	Jimmy Gauld	0	0	0	0	0	0	0	0
	MF	??	Willie Lamont	0	0	0	0	0	0	0	0
	FW	(Scotland) SCO	Harry Yorston	36	17	26	10	5	4	5	3
	FW	(Scotland) SCO	George Hamilton	32	11	26	9	5	2	1	0
	FW	(Scotland) SCO	Archie Baird	23	6	18	6	5	0	0	0
	FW	(England) ENG	Jack Hather	17	6	17	6	0	0	0	0
	FW	(Scotland) SCO	Archie Kelly	15	8	9	5	0	0	6	3
	FW	(Scotland) SCO	Freddie Smith	3	0	1	0	0	0	2	0
	FW	(Scotland) SCO	Jimmy McIntyre	2	0	2	0	0	0	0	0
	FW	??	Ian Rodger	2	0	2	0	0	0	0	0
	FW	??	John McLaren	0	0	0	0	0	0	0	0
	FW	??	Jimmy Muir	0	0	0	0	0	0	0	0
