= Ethel Bidwell =

British research scientist in blood coagulation (1919–2003)

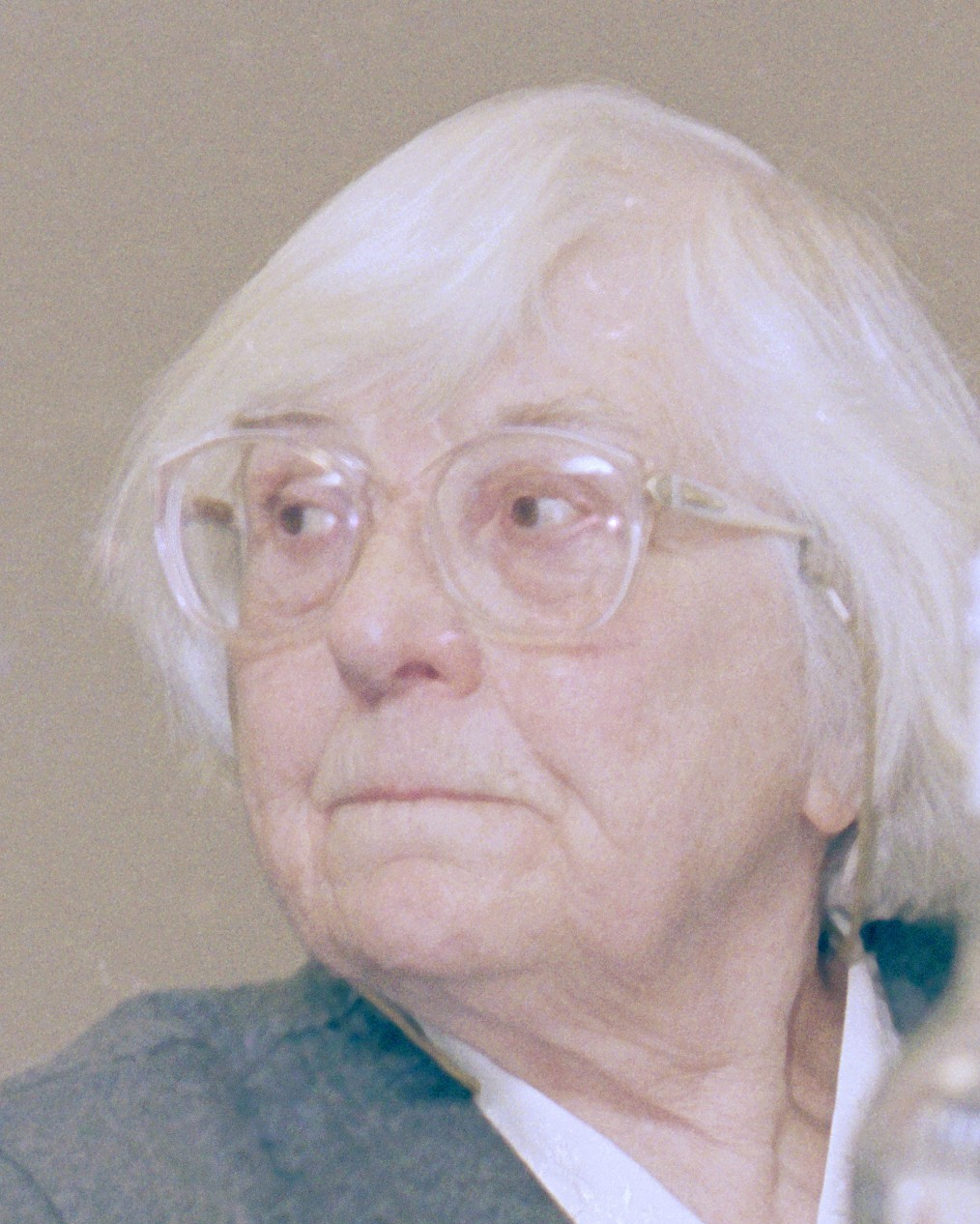
- Bidwell in February 1998
- Born: 12 July 1919; Haslingden, Lancashire, England
- Died: 23 October 2003 (aged 84); Durham, England
- Occupation: Research scientist

Ethel Bidwell PhD (12 July 1919 – 23 October 2003) was a British research scientist who investigated blood coagulation and whose discoveries have been used to successfully perform major surgery on patients with severe haemophilia.

== Biography ==
Bidwell was born on 12 July 1919 in Haslingden, Lancashire. She studied to become an enzyme chemist.

During World War II, Bidwell worked at the Wellcome Foundation on the toxins of anaerobic bacteria involved in gas gangrene.

In 1950, Bidwell joined the University of Oxford team headed by Gwyn Macfarlane. Two years later, she began to study ox and pig plasma concentration and selective extraction of the blood-clotting protein factor VIII. For her research, she would collect the animal blood from local slaughterhouses, which she transported in large glass containers.

By 1953, she had devised a technique to extract and concentrate bovine factor VIII that was 8000 times stronger than human blood plasma. This was a major clinical advance because could be stored frozen. The research was published in 1954.

In 1959 Bidwell was working on the preparation of human coagulation factors at the Medical Research Council Blood Coagulation Research Unit at Churchill Hospital, Headington, Oxford, assisted by Ross Dike.

Bidwell's research was used to successfully perform major surgery on patients with severe haemophilia through intravenous therapeutic use, with the first patient (after clinical trials) recorded in 1961.

Bidwell retired in 1981. She died in 2003 in Durham, England, aged 84.

== Legacy ==
In 1999, British neurochemist and head of the History of Modern Biomedicine Research Group (from 2012 to 2017) Tilli Tansey wrote of inviting Bidwell to participate in a witness seminar convened by the Makers of Modern Biomedicine: Testimonies and Legacy project at the Wellcome Collection and chaired by Christine Lee:

"She was extremely reluctant to attend, telling me over the phone when I invited her that she had nothing to contribute. But I knew, from reading the journals of the time and from a casual conversation with a haematologist friend that she was the person who, in the 1950s, had discovered factor VIII, the first reliable treatment for haemophilia, and I wanted to hear her story."
