= Mick Norcross =

English businessman and television personality (1963–2021)

- Born: Michael John Norcross; 11 May 1963; Haslingden, Lancashire, England
- Died: 21 January 2021 (aged 57); Bulphan, Essex, England
- Occupations: Businessman, television personality
- Years active: 1998–2021
- Television: The Only Way Is Essex
- Spouses: Julie Lloyd (m. 1984, divorced) Kerry Bright (m. 2000, divorced)
- Partner: Samantha Keahey
- Children: 4, including Kirk

Michael John Norcross (11 May 1963 – 21 January 2021) was an English businessman and television personality. He was best known as a recurring cast member on the ITV2 reality television series The Only Way Is Essex (2011–2013).

== Early life ==
Michael John Norcross was born in Haslingden, Lancashire, England on 11 May 1963, as the second child. He had an elder brother, Mark Anthony Norcross and a younger sister, Anita Margaret Bandar.

== Career ==
Norcross was a businessman.

Norcross joined the second series of the ITV2 reality television series The Only Way Is Essex on 20 March 2011. On 8 March 2013, it was reported that he had quit the series and had banned production from filming in his nightclub, Sugar Hut, following his departure; feeling the show had given the club a negative reputation. He only appeared in episode one of the eighth series before departing following the airing of the fourth episode on 6 March 2013. He appeared on 53 episodes. He made a cameo appearance on The Only Way Is Essex: All Back to Essex in 2014.

Norcross appeared on an episode of the ITV talk show Loose Women, which was broadcast on 16 September 2011.

Norcross appeared on the first episode in the first series of the ITV4 celebrity fishing series The Big Fish Off on 11 February 2015.

== Personal life ==
Norcross married his first wife, Julie Nyanda Lloyd, in Thurrock, Essex, in May 1984. They had two sons together: Daniel Michael Norcross and Kirk John Norcross. The couple separated in 1992—and later divorced—when Norcross left Lloyd for his second wife, Kerry Bright, who he married in Brentwood in June 2000. They had two children together. The couple separated in 2008 and later divorced.

Norcross dated several co-stars during his time on The Only Way Is Essex, including Gemma Collins, Chloe Sims and Maria Fowler.

Norcross was in a relationship with Samantha Sian Keahey, a model and former Sugar Hut Honey and later business administrator, from 2019 until his death.

== Death ==
Norcross was found dead at his home in Bulphan, Essex, on 21 January 2021. He was 57. An Essex Police spokesman said officers "were called to an address in Brentwood Road, Bulphan shortly before 15:15 on Thursday" and "sadly, a man inside was pronounced dead". The police spokesman also said the death was "not being treated as suspicious and a file will be prepared for the coroner". The inquest into his death opened in July 2021 and concluded that he died by suicide. Essex's senior coroner Lincoln Brookes told the hearing: "He had been under a great deal of pressure and I accept the evidence of his family that he was a very proud man who saw himself as a provider."

Norcross sent his final tweet at 7:17 AM on the day he died, writing: "At the end remind yourself that you did the best you could. And that is good enough."

== Filmography ==
Year	Title	Notes
2011–2013	The Only Way Is Essex	53 episodes
2011	Loose Women	1 episode
2014	The Only Way Is Essex: All Back to Essex	1 episode
2015	The Big Fish Off	1 episode
