= Calf Hey Reservoir =

Reservoir in Lancashire, England

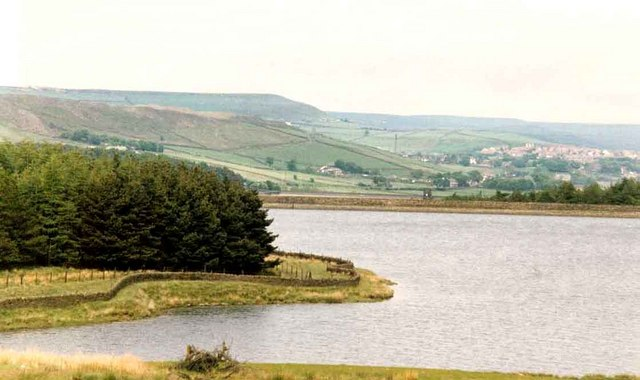
- Calf Hey Reservoir at Haslingden

- Location in Lancashire Location in Rossendale
- Location: Lancashire, England
- Coordinates: 53°41′51″N 2°22′33″W
- Built: 1860

Calf Hey Reservoir is a reservoir in Haslingden Grane, close to the town of Haslingden, in the Borough of Rossendale, England. It was the first of three reservoirs in the valley, the others being Ogden Reservoir and Holden Wood Reservoir.

Not to be confused with the upper of the two Ogden Reservoirs 11 miles to the north, near Nelson.
