= Joe Pattison =

English footballer

Personal information
- Full name: Joseph Pattison
- Date of birth: 3 June 1912
- Place of birth: Haslingden, England
- Date of death: 1988
- Place of death: Haslingden, England
- Position: Goalkeeper

Senior career*
Years	Team	Apps	(Gls)
1931–1932	Burnley	0	(0)
1932–1935	Accrington Stanley	16	(0)
1935–1936	Burnley	0	(0)
- * Club domestic league appearances and goals

Joseph Pattison was an English professional footballer who played as a goalkeeper although, by 1939, he worked as a wool finisher in Haslingden.
