= Haslingden Grane =

Coordinates: 53.701°N 2.365°W

Haslingden Grane: Grane
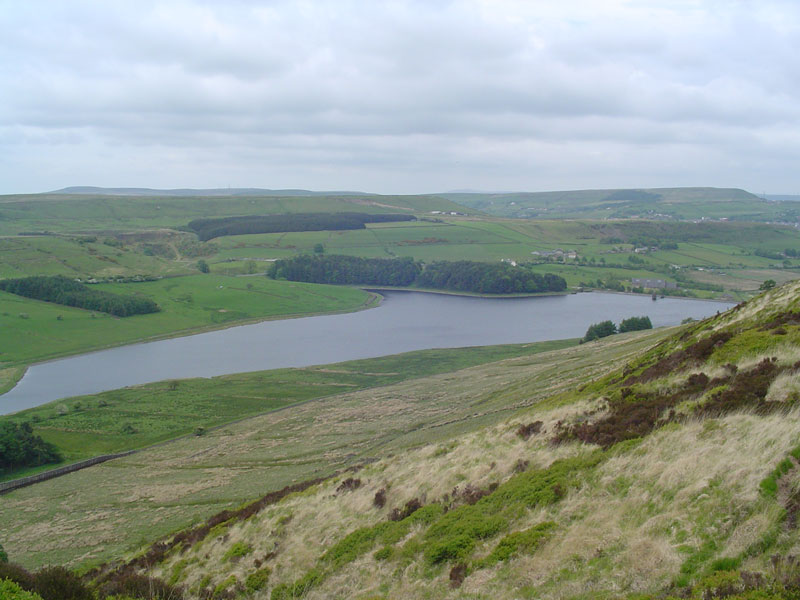
- A view of Ogden reservoir

- Shown within Rossendale Location within Lancashire
- OS grid reference: SD755225
- District: Rossendale
- Shire county: Lancashire
- Region: North West
- Country: England
- Sovereign state: United Kingdom
- Post town: ROSSENDALE
- Postcode district: BB4
- Dialling code: 01706
- Police: Lancashire
- Fire: Lancashire
- Ambulance: North West

Haslingden Grane is the glaciated upper portion of the valley of the River Ogden, which lies west of Haslingden and is in the north east section of the West Pennine Moors. To the north is Oswaldtwistle Moor, and to the south Musbury Heights. It was once the home of Grane village, and is easily accessible via the B6232/A6077 Grane Road which links to the M65 motorway and the A56. Grane valley is dominated by its three reservoirs, Holden Wood, Calf Hey and Ogden.

== The village ==
Almost nothing now remains of Grane village. Yet before the construction of the reservoirs in the 19th century, the settlement of Haslingden Grane had a population of over 1,300. It had a church, a Methodist chapel, three mills and a school. Many of the inhabitants combined mill-work with small-scale farming. Quarrying was also an important activity, with the village being situated immediately to the north of the workings on Musbury Heights. There was also a brickworks in the village. The people were considered locally to be independent and frugal, and spoke with a strong, distinctive accent. Grane produced many local 'characters', such as the headmaster of Grane School, J.T. Pilling, who left the school to go gold prospecting in the Yukon. Grane was strongly Church of England, whereas most neighbouring communities were nonconformist in their religious beliefs. Haslingden stone was used as a building and paving material, and a lot of it was quarried above Grane from Musbury Heights quarry. A special narrow-gauge railway connected the quarry to Grane.

The historian Chris Aspin notes in his book 'Haslingden', co-authored with Derek Pilkington, that the Grane community would 'almost certainly have objected' to being included under the Haslingden banner, and would have preferred to be considered as an independent community.

== Whisky distilling ==
Grane was notorious as the centre of an illegal whisky distilling industry. Locally this was known as 'whisky spinning'. Great ingenuity was displayed in covering traces of the distilling operations, and many of the successful prosecutions appear to be the result of 'tip-offs' after village disputes. Excise officers, police and Inland Revenue raided Grane on 3 April 1857. At first they found nothing, but eventually - after three days - they uncovered hidden rooms and underground chambers and pipework dedicated to the distilling. There is a story that the daughter of a weaving family often delivered Grane whisky to a Haslingden hotel by donkey. She would fill a hollow metal saddle with three or four gallons of the liquid concealed beneath bales of woven cloth. Something similar was used by a man at Haslingden Fair, where he wore a metal waist coat containing a quantity of Grane whisky. In spite of the prosecutions, whisky distilling continued until the early 20th century.

== Reservoirs and depopulation ==
The valley now contains three reservoirs: (west to east) Calf Hey Reservoir, constructed 1860; Ogden Reservoir, 1912; and Holden Wood Reservoir, 1842. The construction of Ogden Reservoir to provide a reliable water supply to the rapidly expanding industrial populations by the Bury & District Joint Water Board in 1900, which required the purchase of land, mills and homes began the virtual depopulation of the village. At first, despite the village being deserted, St. Stephen's Church remained in use. In 1925 it was decided to move the church stone by stone to Three Lanes End on the outskirts of Haslingden, where a temporary church had already been erected. Most of the community had moved to Haslingden, and in March 1926, a crowd of 400 attended the stone-laying for the new site of the church.

== Grane today ==
The Grane area with its moorland scenery has made it a popular place for walking. There is an information centre, parking and cafe at Clough Head, from which several walking routes radiate. Remains of some buildings in the area can still be seen, including a small graveyard. The walk around Ogden Reservoir is particularly popular, with a dedicated car-park, a surfaced path and information boards explaining the existing ruins. One example of this is the ruined Hartley House, about three hundred yards west of the village, and on the circular footpath. A 1798 survey indicates that it was made up of two farmhouses and four cottages. Three of the cottages were occupied by weavers. The farm had about 40 acres of land, which included 30 acres of pasture, six acres of meadow, three acres of woodland, and one and a half acres of arable land. By 1827 there were four farms at Hartley House along with six other dwellings. Space had been made to accommodate weaving by adding loom shops to two of the farmhouses.

Jamestone Quarry, below Clough Head, is tightly secured, but still draws young people to it in the summer, to swim in its water despite this being dangerous. Troy Quarry, nearby, is popular with climbers and has been used as a location for the filming of Peaky Blinders.

St. Stephen's Church is now a Grade II listed building, and the home of Holden Wood Antiques, with a cafe and large antique shopping area.

== Wildlife ==
Reptiles and amphibians recorded on Grane are Common Frog, Common Toad, Palmate Newt and Adder.

Grane is a good place to see butterflies. Peacock, Red Admiral, Painted Lady and Small Tortoiseshell are common, but there also Gatekeeper, Comma, Common Blue, Wall Brown. One of the rarest species is the Green Hairstreak, which feeds on the crowberry, which is abundant on the nearby moorland. 44 species of moths have also been recorded.

Grane is also rich in birdlife, with at least 78 breeding species. A bird hide with disabled access is situated at the Clough Head parking and cafe area.
