= Lavinia Loughridge =

Northern Irish physician

Lavinia Winifred Loughridge (20 May 1930 – 22 March 2014) was a Northern Irish physician who specialised in nephrology. She was one of the pioneers of kidney transplantation, working with Sir Roy Yorke Calne on Britain's first transplantation programme to use cadaveric kidneys.

== Early life and education ==
Loughridge was born in 1930 in Templepatrick to John Carson Loughridge, a general practitioner, and Winifred Elizabeth Loughridge, a pianist. She attended Victoria College in Belfast and received her medical degree from Queen's University Belfast in 1954.

== Career ==
She began her career with house posts at Belfast's Royal Victoria Hospital before moving to London in 1955 to work at Hammersmith Hospital as a house physician. She returned to the Royal Belfast as a registrar in 1956 before moving back to Hammersmith in 1957.

Loughridge was later appointed consultant at Westminster Hospital, making her the first female consultant at the hospital. She became a lecturer at Westminster Hospital Medical School in 1961; there, she and Malcolm Milne founded an academic department of nephrology. She worked with Sir Roy Yorke Calne in Britain's first kidney transplantation programme using cadaveric organs, and she co-authored an important article published in the BMJ in 1963 which showed that double immunosuppressant therapy—which later became the standard—reduced the risk of transplant rejection and improved the odds of survival after kidney transplants. She was also among the first physicians to begin using dialysis machines in patients with kidney failure. She was elected Fellow of the Royal College of Physicians in 1973 and served as the college's censor in 1988 and senior vice president in 1993–95.

== Personal life ==
Loughridge was married twice: first to Sir Christopher Booth, with whom she had two children, and later to the American anaesthetist John Bunker. She retired in 1995 and died in 2014 after a long illness.
