= Robert Gwyn Macfarlane =

English hematologist (1907-1987)

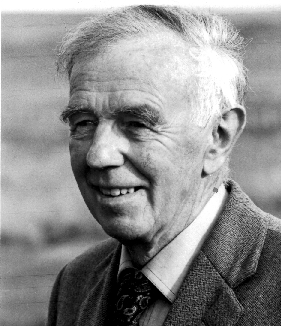
- Born: 26 June 1907; Worthing, West Sussex, England, United Kingdom
- Died: 26 March 1987 (aged 79); Opinan, Scottish Highlands, Scotland, United Kingdom
- Education: University of London
- Known for: Haematology, science, biography
- Awards: Cameron Prize for Therapeutics of the University of Edinburgh (1968)

Robert Gwyn Macfarlane CBE FRS (26 June 1907 – 26 March 1987) was an English hematologist.

== Life ==
Born in Worthing, Sussex, Gwyn Macfarlane left Cheltenham College in 1924 and a year later entered the Medical School of St Bartholomew's Hospital, London. In 1936 he married Hilary Carson MD and over the next 11 years had five children, a girl followed by four boys. Hilary practised as a GP, whilst always offering Gwyn great academic support. She died in 2010 aged 100 years. During Macfarlane's clinical years he was exposed to the sufferings of haemophiliacs and this subject became the core for his lifelong study into the processes of blood clotting.

He examined the venom of many different snakes and isolated the poison of the Russell's viper to have the strongest blood coagulant powers see video. He found that when a compound that included venom at dilutions of 1 in 100,000 was applied to a wound, bleeding diminished. This medicine was later marketed as Stypven by Burroughs Welcome Ltd.. Stypven Time is now a standard measure for coagulation efficiency. This research was the basis for his London M.D. thesis for which he was awarded the University Gold Medal, in 1938.

In 1940 Macfarlane took the position of Clinical Pathologist at the Radcliffe Infirmary in Oxford. With a year as a Major in the Royal Army Medical Corps in 1944, where he was involved trying to treat the complications of gas gangrene on the war front, he continued to work in Oxford for the rest of his professional life. He led a team that included Rosemary Biggs and Ethel Bidwell, to investigate congenital coagulation defects, the treatment of bleeding disorders and to develop replacement therapies that enabled haemophiliacs to enjoy an almost normal life.

Perhaps his greatest contribution to modern medicine was his deciphering of the Enzyme cascade process of blood coagulation. Working in 1951 with Prof Alexander Stuart Douglas at the Blood Coagulation Research Unit in Oxford they jointly discovered a second strain of haemophilia, now known as Haemophilia B, but then known as Christmas disease after its first known sufferer, Stephen Christmas.

In 1956 he was elected to the fellowship of The Royal Society, in 1963 he was elected a Fellow of All Souls College and in 1965 was appointed Professor of Clinical Pathology at Oxford University. In 1966, he was awarded the Cameron Prize for Therapeutics of the University of Edinburgh.

Gwyn Macfarlane was a close associate of Howard Florey during the development of a process to extract penicillin from culture grown in the Dunn School of Medicine. Baron Florey went on to be President of the Royal Society and Macfarlane developed an enormous respect for the capabilities of a man, held by many to be one of the greatest scientists of the twentieth century. Macfarlane considered that the role Florey had played in the development of Penicillin had been overshadowed, so when he retired to Scotland in 1967 he commenced his first authoritative biography Howard Florey, The Making of a Great Scientist which was published in 1979. Later, Macfarlane's second book Alexander Fleming, The Man and the Myth examined the life of the other great contributor to the age of anti-bacterial engineering. In later life Macfarlane felt that his close personal exposure to these developments left him as a conduit to modern science education, and his contributions both written and in BBC TV programs etc. will always be valuable.

In 1988, following Macfarlane's death in the previous year, The Macfarlane Trust (named after him) was established to help British haemophiliacs affected by the Tainted Blood Scandal.

== Selected works ==
1934 (with B. Barnett) The haemostatic possibilities of snake venom. Lancet, ii,985

1938 The normal haemostatic mechanism and its failure in the haemorrhagic states. Thesis for Doctor of Medicine, University of London.

1953 (with R. Biggs) Human Blood Coagulation and its Disorders. Blackwell Scientific Publications, Oxford.

1961 (with A.H.T.Robb-Smith) (ed) Functions of the Blood. Academic Press, New York.

1964 An enzyme cascade in the blood clotting mechanism, and its function as a biochemical amplifier. Nature, Lond. 202,221

1979 Howard Florey, The Making of a Great Scientist, Oxford University Press

1984 Alexander Fleming, The Man and the Myth, Chatto and Windus,

== See also ==
- John Richard O'Brien

== Interest factor ==
Video, Russell's Viper Venom, Blood clotting
