= History of Modern Biomedicine Research Group =

Academic organization

- Abbreviation: HoMBRG
- Formation: 1990
- Type: Historical research body
- Parent organization: Queen Mary University of London
- Website: www.histmodbiomed.org
- Formerly called: History of Twentieth Century Medicine Group

The History of Modern Biomedicine Research Group (HoMBRG) is an academic organisation specialising in recording and publishing the oral history of twentieth and twenty-first century biomedicine. It was established in 1990 as the Wellcome Trust's History of Twentieth Century Medicine Group, and reconstituted in October 2010 as part of the School of History at Queen Mary University of London.

== History ==
The project originated as The Wellcome Trust's History of Twentieth Century Medicine Group, and later functioned as the Academic Unit of the Wellcome Institute for the History of Medicine. It was originally established at the Royal College of Physicians in 1990 and comprised Sir Christopher Booth (the Harveian Librarian) and Professor Tilli Tansey. Its purpose was to devise ways of stimulating historians, scientists & clinicians to discuss, preserve and write the history of recent biomedicine. The Group's activities were originally overseen by a Programme Committee, which included professional historians of medicine, practising scientists and clinicians. From 2000 to 2010 it was a constituent part of the Wellcome Trust Centre for the History of Medicine at University College London. In October 2010 it moved to the School of History, Queen Mary's University, London. In 2011 the Group received a Strategic Award from the Wellcome Trust to embark upon a new project, "Makers of Modern Biomedicine".

== Outputs ==
An archive of oral and written history, plus videoed interviews, has been compiled by the HoMBRG and consists of three projects: Witness Seminars, Today's Neuroscience, Tomorrow's History and SAD at 30. All material and documentation related to the project is deposited with the Wellcome Library. The resultant publications are open access, and made freely available online via the HoMBRG website, a partnership with the Medical Heritage Library, and iTunes.

The topics covered by the archive fall broadly into five themes: clinical genetics, neuroscience, global health and infectious diseases, medical technologies and ethics of research and practice.

Resources from the archive are online at The History of Modern Biomedicine Archive and the internet archive

=== Today's Neuroscience, Tomorrow's History ===
The Group's 'Today's Neuroscience, Tomorrow's History' initiative (2006–2008) was funded by a Wellcome Trust Public Engagement grant. It recorded interviews on three themes, neuropharmacology, psychiatry/neuropsychology, and neuroimaging, with twelve neuroscientists, including Geoffrey Burnstock, Salvador Moncada, Michael Rutter and Uta Frith.

=== The Witness Seminars ===
A series of witness seminars began in 1993, with regular meetings being held, about four per year. These recorded the voices of those who have contributed, in diverse ways, to the development of modern biomedicine, using oral history methodology. The aim is to make the series widely available for education, research and outreach purposes. The results are published online, with most edited transcripts appearing within 18 months.

Witness Seminar participants have included Usama Abdulla, Thomas Brown, Professor Dugald Cameron, Professor Stuart Campbell, John Fleming, Professor John MacVicar, Professor Peter Wells, Dr James Willocks, Sir Douglas Black, Sir John Gray, Sir Raymond Hoffenberg, Dr Sheila Howarth, Professor Peter Lachmann, Sir Patrick Nairne, Professor Sir Stanley Peart, Dr Peter Williams and Professor Anthony PM Coxon.

Each witness seminar is transcribed and published by HoMBRG. Recent volumes have been edited by E M Jones, C Overy and E M Tansey. As of May 2017 there are 62 Volumes. Titles include The Development of Brain Banks, Narrative Medicine; Migraine; The National Survey of Sexual Attitudes and Lifestyles; and The Avon Longitudinal Study of Parents and Children (ALSPAC) The publication of these works are often referred to by specialists in their fields of medical practice.

The first two volumes were reviewed in Journal of the Royal Society of Medicine in 1999, with the comment, "Few books are so intellectually stimulating or uplifting." Reviewing the series in the British Medical Journal in 2002, medical historian Irvine Loudon wrote, "This is oral history at its best...all the volumes make compulsive reading...they are, primarily, important historical records

In 2014 a seminar, chaired by Professor Sir Brian Follett, with Norman Rosenthal and Alfred Lewy, entitled 'The Recent History of Seasonal Affective Disorder (SAD): 30 Years of SAD' was undertaken on the topic of Seasonal Affective Disorder. This resulted in a number of podcasts, and Volume 51 of the Witness Seminar publications.

=== Clips and Conversations ===
In 2015 the Group began producing oral history interviews with notable scientists and clinicians. This material is made freely available on YouTube (in the case of video interviews) and the Group's website, as are the transcripts of both audio and video interviews.

=== Wikidata ===
As the HoMBRG project came to an end, a Wikimedian in Residence was engaged, to create Wikidata records for the publications and those people interviewed in them.
