= Eugenie Cheesmond =

Psychiatrist and Lifeline founder (1919-2007)

Dr Eugenie Hilda Dorothy Cheesmond (13 June 1919 – 11 October 2007) was a psychiatrist with a particular interest in drug addiction who formed the Lifeline charity in 1971.

== Early life in South Africa ==
Eugenie Cheesmond was born in Hove, Brighton, UK, to Dorothy Helene Emma Cheesmond, of Bloemfontein, South Africa. Three months later both returned to South Africa. Despite coming from a relatively wealthy white family, Cheesmond became politically active early in her life. She campaigned against the Apartheid regime, and gave money to the African National Congress. After completing her education her first job was as a house-doctor in Pietermaritzburg, Natal.

In 1944 she married her first husband, Archibald Park-Ross and had her first child. She married for a second time to a Mr. Rutavitz in 1952, and had two further children. Then she left South Africa in 1956 at the age of 37, going on to study at Cambridge, England, Berkeley, California and Manchester Universities. Shortly after completing her studies, Cheesmond left to work in Kenya for 18 months as a 'government general practitioner' in Nairobi which she enjoyed, describing it as 'an entirely non-racial practice'.

== Medical work in England ==
Returning to the UK, Cheesmond then worked as a Registrar Psychiatrist at Parkside Hospital, Macclesfield for the Manchester Regional Hospital Board. Her approach was often unconventional and she clashed with the Hospital Board after she set up a residential facility for treating 12 drug-dependent young people at her home in the hospital grounds. The hospital wished the young people to become in-patients and Cheesmond refused their request. In 1969, after an interview with Ministry of Health inspectors, Cheesmond's contract with the Health Board was not renewed. Cheesmond eventually moved to Rossendale, and worked as a Liaison Medical Organiser for NHS/Social Services at Burnley, Pendle and Rossendale NHS.

== Lifeline charity ==
After the experience of conflict with the Macclesfield hospital, Cheesmond formed EROS, a charitable organisation working with drug addiction, and in 1971 this became the Lifeline Trust, with support from the Bishop of Manchester and the On The 8th Day Collective. Despite the problems with the Manchester Hospital Board, Cheesman gained support from local Members of Parliament and local churches to set up a drug-addiction centre. Cheesmond felt that the prevailing orthodoxy in the treatment of drug addiction was wrong. She was "incensed at official methods of handling the drug problem, particularly among young people. She believes that when they aren't punitive, they're incompetent..."

Lifeline in its early days was described by Rowdy Yates, co-founder and himself a former drug user, as 'a therapeutic soup kitchen' and a 'place to crash' for drug users. Yates is now Senior Research Fellow at Stirling University. In his Therapeutic Communities Archive tribute to Cheesmond, Yates writes 'she was...a powerful force at a time when many in the medical profession felt that addiction was simply incurable'. Lifeline referred people on to residential therapeutic communities, and developed programmes such as the Bail Release Scheme. The Lifeline project was wound up in 2017 after Charity Commissioners reacted to claims about weak financial controls. At that point it employed 1,300 workers and provided services for 80,000 people a year, including prisoners in 22 jails and other institutions.

== Later life ==
Cheesmond retired from medical practice at 65. She joined the ANC, and opened an Oxfam shop at her home in Haslingden. She was an active member of the Labour Party, and party meetings were frequently held at her home. In 1993 she set up a wholefood shop at her home, and named it Zobiluke. Cheesmond continued with her political activism until her death in 2007.
