= John Richard O'Brien =

John Richard O'Brien (6 November 1915 - 27 October 2002), was a British haematologist, who worked on platelets, which he recognised the importance of in coronary thrombosis. Along with R. G. Macfarlane he gave the first description of Haemophilia B, then known as Christmas disease.
