= Don Emery =

Welsh footballer

Personal information
- Full name: Donald Kenneth James Emery
- Date of birth: 11 June 1920
- Place of birth: Cardiff, Wales
- Date of death: 19 November 1993 (aged 73)
- Place of death: Aberdeen, Scotland
- Position: Left-back

Senior career*
Years	Team	Apps	(Gls)
1937–1948	Swindon Town	69	(3)
1948–1952	Aberdeen	89	(17)
1952–1956	East Fife	92	(5)
Total		250	(25)

Managerial career
- Fraserburgh
- * Club domestic league appearances and goals

Don Emery (11 June 1920 – 19 November 1993) was a Welsh footballer. He played for Swindon Town, Aberdeen and East Fife, and in the late 1950s managed Scottish Highland Football League Club, Fraserburgh FC. In 1969 he was part of a consortium that failed in an attempt to unseat and replace the board of Aberdeen FC.

== Career statistics ==
=== Appearances and goals by club, season and competition ===
Club	Season	League			National Cup		League Cup		Europe		Total	
Club	Season	Division	Apps	Goals	Apps	Goals	Apps	Goals	Apps	Goals	Apps	Goals
Swindon Town	1937–38	Third Division South	1	0	0	0	0	0	-	-	1	0
Swindon Town	1938–39	Third Division South	8	1	1	0	0	0	-	-	9	1
Swindon Town	1939–40	Competitive Football Cancelled Due to WW2										
Swindon Town	1940–41	Competitive Football Cancelled Due to WW2										
Swindon Town	1941–42	Competitive Football Cancelled Due to WW2										
Swindon Town	1942–43	Competitive Football Cancelled Due to WW2										
Swindon Town	1943–44	Competitive Football Cancelled Due to WW2										
Swindon Town	1944–45	Competitive Football Cancelled Due to WW2										
Swindon Town	1945–46	Competitive Football Cancelled Due to WW2										
Swindon Town	1946–47	Third Division South	23	2	2	0	0	0	-	-	25	2
Swindon Town	1947–48	Third Division South	37	0	5	0	0	0	-	-	42	0
Swindon Town	Total		69	3	8	0	0	0	-	-	77	3
Aberdeen	1948–49	Scottish Division One	15	5	0	0	3	0	0	0	18	5
Aberdeen	1949–50	Scottish Division One	29	5	5	1	6	3	0	0	40	9
Aberdeen	1950–51	Scottish Division One	25	4	2	1	10	2	0	0	37	7
Aberdeen	1951–52	Scottish Division One	20	3	4	0	6	1	0	0	30	4
Aberdeen	Total		89	17	11	2	25	6	0	0	125	25
East Fife	1952–53	-	-	-	-	-	-	-	-	-	-	-
East Fife	1953–54	-	-	-	-	-	-	-	-	-	-	-
East Fife	1954–55	-	-	-	-	-	-	-	-	-	-	-
East Fife	1955–56	-	-	-	-	-	-	-	-	-	-	-
East Fife	Total		92	5	-	-	-	-	-	-	92+	5+
Career total			250	25	19+	2+	25+	6+	0	0	294+	27+
