= Solomon Commercials =

British manufacturing company

Factory in Haslingden, 2008

Solomon Commercials is a British company that manufactures refrigerated trailers, based in Bacup, Lancashire with a factory in Haslingden. It was founded in 1976. As of 2024 it was owned by the Solomon family and employed around 400 people.

Refrigerated vehicle made by Solomon, 2022 (logo at top right)
