= Christopher Booth =

English physician

Sir Christopher Charles Booth (22 June 1924 – 13 July 2012) was an English clinician and medical historian, characterised as "one of the great characters of British medicine".

Booth was born in 1924 in Farnham, Surrey. His father Lionel Booth is credited as the inventor of the telephoto lens. He was brought up in Wensleydale, Yorkshire and attended Sedbergh School.

He served as a frogman in the Royal Navy from 1942. A Navy doctor encouraged him to study medicine, so he enrolled at the Bute Medical School of the University of St. Andrews on demobilisation and graduated in 1951, serving as a houseman in Dundee before moving to the postgraduate medical school at Hammersmith hospital in London. His MD was awarded in 1958 for work showing that Vitamin B12 is absorbed at the far end of the small intestine, work for which he also received the Rutherford gold medal.

His medical speciality was gastroenterology and he was a founder of Coeliac UK. He was also director of the Medical Research Council Clinical Research Centre at Northwick Park and research director at the Wellcome Institute for the History of Medicine. He was president of the British Medical Association from 1986 to 1987 and president of the Royal Society of Medicine from 1988 to 1990.

Booth defended Chris Pallis, a neurologist working under him at Hammersmith Hospital, when he was attacked for his left-wing views. He was also an outspoken, on one occasion noting that taking the doctors' pay demand to the then prime minister, Margaret Thatcher, would be not a red rag to a bull, as a colleague suggested, but "a red rag to an old cow".

He published four books and 50 papers on the history of medicine, and played a leading role in the founding of the History of Modern Biomedicine Research Group.

A ward at the Hammersmith Hospital is named after him and looks after gastroenterology patients.

He married three times; firstly Lavinia Loughridge, with whom he had a son and daughter, secondly Professor Soad Tabaqchali, with whom he had another daughter and lastly Joyce Singleton, who survived him.

== Awards and honours ==
- Honorary Fellow, American College of Physicians, 1973
- Chevalier de l’Ordre National du Mérite, 1977
- Honorary LLD, University of Dundee, 1982
- International member, American Philosophical Society, 1981
- Honorary Fellow, Royal Society of Medicine, 1991
- Knighted for services to medicine in 1982
