= George Yates (Lancashire cricketer) =

English cricketer

Personal information
- Full name: George Yates
- Born: 6 June 1856; Haslingden, Lancashire, England
- Died: 21 August 1925 (aged 69); Marple, Cheshire, England
- Batting: Right-handed
- Bowling: Right-arm roundarm fast

Domestic team information
- Years: Team
- 1885–1894: Lancashire

Career statistics
Competition	First-class
Matches	92
Runs scored	1,632
Batting average	13.60
100s/50s	–/4
Top score	74
Balls bowled	1,840
Wickets	30
Bowling average	31.13
5 wickets in innings	–
10 wickets in match	–
Best bowling	4/112
Catches/stumpings	41/–
- Source: CricketArchive, 12 August 2012

George Yates (6 June 1856 – 21 August 1925) was an English cricketer who represented Lancashire from 1885 to 1894

Yates was born in Haslingden, Lancashire. He played cricket for Werneth in 1880, and in 1881 was living with his wife Annie at the pavilion of Werneth Cricket Club, in Chamber Road, Oldham, Lancashire. He made his debut for Lancashire in July 1885 against Surrey when he made 10 runs in his only innings and took a catch. Yates was a right-hand batsman and played 135 innings in 92 first-class matches with an average of 13.60 and a top score of 74. He was a round arm right-arm fast bowler and took 30 first-class wickets at an average of 31.13 and a best performance of 4 for 112.

Yates died in Marple, Cheshire, at the age of 69.
