= Tilli Tansey =

British medical historian

Tilli Tansey CBE FMedSci FRCP
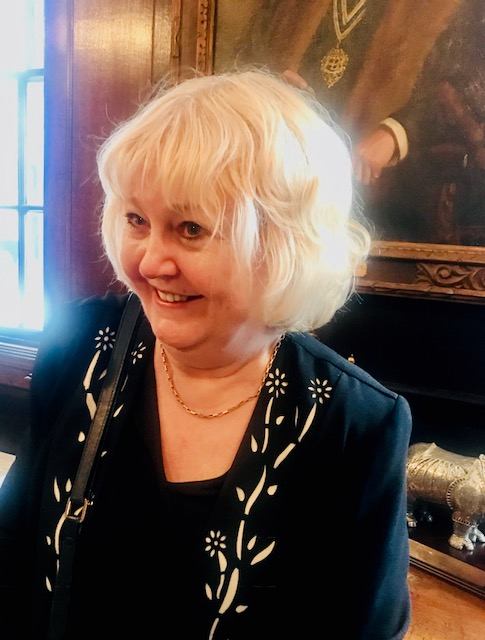
- Tansey in 2018
- Born: Elizabeth Matilda Tansey
- Education: University of Sheffield; University of London
- Known for: Witness seminars
- Scientific career
- Fields: Neuroscience; History of science History of medicine
- Workplaces: Queen Mary University of London; University College London
- Theses: The early scientific career of Sir Henry Dale FRS (1875–1968) (1990); A histochemical study of the cephalopod brain (1978)
- Tansey's voice recorded June 2017
- Website: iris.ucl.ac.uk/iris/browse/profile?upi=EMTTA57

Elizabeth Matilda "Tilli" Tansey is a British neurochemist who is an Emerita Professor of the history of medicine and former neurochemist, best known for her role in the Wellcome Trust's witness seminars. She previously worked at Queen Mary University of London (QMUL).

== Education ==
Tansey was educated at the University of Sheffield where she was awarded a PhD in 1978 for histochemical studies of the brain in cephalopods. After switching fields from neuroscience to the history of science, she was awarded a second PhD in the history of science for her research on the early career of the nobel laureate Henry Hallett Dale.

== Career and research ==
Between 2012 and 2017, she was head of the History of Modern Biomedicine Research Group, on a five-year research project funded by the Wellcome Trust titled The Makers of Modern Biomedicine: Testimonies and Legacy, to record oral testimonies from those who have contributed significantly to modern medical sciences.

Tansey's Witness Seminar series, held at the Wellcome Trust Centre, had the aim of bringing together medical professionals, scientists and technicians in group discussions, with the purpose of learning about significant periods in the history recent medicine. Topics covered have included oral contraceptives, genetic testing, and post-penicillin antibiotics.

=== Selected publications ===
- She co-edited a book with Susan Wray celebrating one hundred years of women physiologists.
- The History of Toxicology: the Long and Short of it
- Rudolf Magnus; Physiologist and Pharmacologist (1873–1927): A Biography concerning Rudolf Magnus

=== Awards and honours ===
Tansey is an honorary member of The Physiological Society. In 2015, at the centenary of women's membership of the Physiological Society, Tansey received the Paton prize and presented her prize lecture entitled Maude, Nettie, Ghetel and George, a study of some women married to early nineteenth century Physiological Society members. She was elected a Fellow of the Academy of Medical Sciences in 2007.

In 2017 she was elected an honorary fellow of the Royal Society of Medicine.
