= Coeliac UK =

UK charity

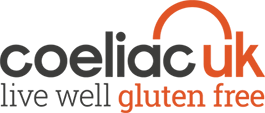
- Formation: 1968
- Founder: Peter Benenson, Elisabeth Seagall
- Legal status: Registered charity
- Location: 3rd Floor, Artisan, Hillbottom Road, High Wycombe, Buckinghamshire, HP12 4HJ
- Members: 67,000
- CEO: Saskia Konynenburg
- Key people: Caroline Quentin
- Website: www.coeliac.org.uk

Coeliac UK is a UK charity for people with coeliac disease, an autoimmune condition which the charity estimates affects 1 in 100 people in the UK, and the skin manifestation of the condition, dermatitis herpetiformis (DH).

== History ==
Founded in 1968 by Amnesty International founder Peter Benenson, a coeliac, and Elizabeth Segall, the mother of a coeliac daughter, Coeliac UK (originally called The Coeliac Society) launched the first symbol that acknowledged and advertised that a product contained no gluten, namely the Crossed Grain symbol. Noted clinician Sir Christopher Booth was a founding member.

The charity renamed itself Coeliac UK in 2001 and has since established the All Party Parliamentary Group on coeliac disease and DH and worked with the Food Standards Agency to introduce a new law that governed the labelling of gluten-free food.

in 2015, English actress Caroline Quentin became the current patron of the charity.

== Activities ==
=== Research ===
Coeliac UK is one of the largest funders of research into coeliac disease in the UK, having committed over £3.5 million since 2005. The charity funds research to help recognise, diagnose, treat and cure coeliac disease, driving measurable national impact.

=== Campaigns and Advocacy ===
Coeliac UK runs several national campaigns to improve diagnosis and support. A major initiative is the "Is it coeliac disease?" campaign, which includes a free online self-assessment symptom checker designed to help identify the estimated 500,000 undiagnosed individuals in the UK. The charity also actively campaigns on the cost of living, highlighting the significant financial burden of maintaining a gluten free diet and advocating for the protection of gluten free prescriptions on the NHS. Additionally, Coeliac UK works with professional bodies and policymakers to improve healthcare pathways and has showcased its research priorities in the House of Commons.

=== Accreditation scheme ===
In 2013, the charity launched its accreditation scheme, a framework for hospitality providers including restaurants and hotels. In order to earn this accreditation, establishments must undergo training, initial and ongoing compliance checks to ensure that their meals meet safety standards of no more than 20mg/kg gluten.

As of 2025, over 3,000 establishments across the UK had received this accreditation.

=== Food Information Service ===
The charity also runs a Food Information Service which offers information on the suitability of over 200,000 dedicated gluten free and mainstream foods.

=== Education and Training ===
Coeliac UK develops comprehensive educational resources for various sectors. For healthcare professionals, the charity offers continued professional development (CPD) opportunities, including an annual research conference and access to up-to-date clinical guidelines. In the education sector, Coeliac UK provides specific guidance documents, legal overviews, and catering resources to help schools and childcare settings safely support children with coeliac disease. The charity also operates the "Gluten Free Academy," an online training platform designed for catering professionals in hospitality, healthcare, and education to ensure safe food handling practices.
