= Medical Heritage Library =

Digital medical library

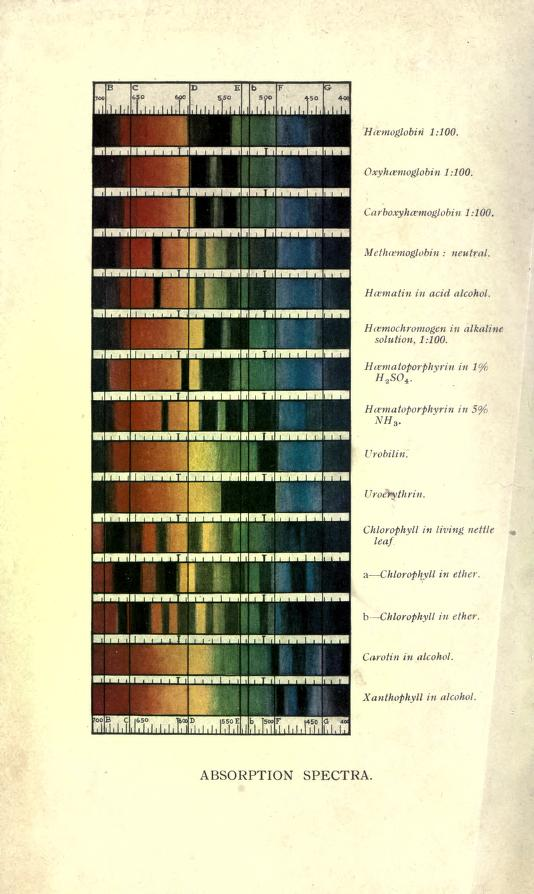
Absorption spectra chart from "Practical Organic and Biochemistry"

The Medical Heritage Library (MHL) was a digital curation collaborative among several medical libraries which promoted free and open access to quality historical resources in medicine. The MHL is digitized books and journals and worked to expand to the digitization of archival materials and still images. In 2010, the MHL began digitizing titles, mainly monographs, in a variety of medical history and related fields including chemistry, nursing, dentistry, audiology, physiology, psychology, psychiatry, biological science, hydrotherapy, weather, veterinary medicine, gardening, physical culture, and alternative medicine chosen for their scholarly, educational, and research value. Since the inception of the project, materials in audio and video formats have been added to the collection.

The Medical Heritage Library closed in 2024.

== Goals ==
The MHL goals were:

1. Develop an organizational structure that will ensure sustainability of MHL activities
2. Increase institutional membership to ensure rich content contributions and international coverage
3. Seek and exploit collaborative opportunities with users, creators, contributors, and peer digital libraries that further the MHL’s work
4. Develop methodologies and projects that measure the impact and evaluate the benefits of the Medical Heritage Library to the communities it serves
5. Develop and promote tools to enhance discovery and use of content by exposing linkages among the content across partner repositories and across formats
6. Develop means to match archaic medical terminology to current terminology in order to expose the relevance of medical historical content to current medical practice, teaching, and research
7. Develop access and content management strategies that align with one or more existing large-scale digital projects such as HathiTrust, the Digital Public Library of America and the Biodiversity Heritage Library
8. Incorporate preservation as a requirement for future content development
9. Continue to improve access to the collection
10. Provide leadership regarding access and privacy issues unique to medical content in order to enable access in compliance with applicable ethical, legal, and regulatory codes

== Library scope and history ==
The MHL maintained a blog, Twitter account, and Facebook page to interact with researchers, librarians, archivists, students, and the interested general public about the MHL collections, the history of medicine, digital humanities, and related topics.

The MHL began digitization of monographs in 2010 with an initial grant from the Sloan Foundation. Work on the MHL project has continued with funding support from collaborating institutions, the National Endowment for the Humanities (announcement), and the Mellon Foundation via a program administered by the Council on Library and Information Resources (announcement). All digitized works are located at the Internet Archive.

The collection includes books, pamphlets, journals, and video and audio recordings in the history of medicine and related fields. A working list of subject headings is available here. Titles have been chosen for their scholarly, educational, and research value. The MHL consults with a volunteer group of scholars in the history of medicine and related fields and surveys its users regularly. As of August 2014, the collection consists of nearly 60,000 items including monographs, journals, audio and video on topics including surgery, public health, infectious diseases, gynecology, psychology, anatomy, neuroscience, tobacco, and homeopathy.

The MHL created a full-text search tool for use by researchers. The tool allowed users to search the full-text of one or more items simultaneously.

The UK Medical Heritage Library started in 2014 with nine digitisation partners in England and Scotland, including [UCL] (University College London), the [University of Leeds], the [University of Glasgow], the [London School of Hygiene & Tropical Medicine], [King's College London], and the [University of Bristol] - along with the libraries of the [Royal College of Physicians of London], the [Royal College of Physicians of Edinburgh], and the [Royal College of Surgeons of England]. The original partnership is between the [Wellcome Library] and [Jisc]. Material digitized by the UK MHL project is also available through the MHL portal at the Internet Archive and searchable through the full-text search tool described above.

=== Members ===
Original members of the collaborative formed in 2010 are:

- Augustus C. Long Health Sciences Library at Columbia University
- College of Physicians of Philadelphia
- Cushing/Whitney Medical Library at Yale University
- Francis A. Countway Library of Medicine at Harvard University
- National Library of Medicine
- New York Academy of Medicine
- New York Public Library
- Open Knowledge Commons
- Welch Medical Library, Library of the Institute of the History of Medicine, and the Alan Mason Chesney Medical Archives of the Johns Hopkins Medical Institutions
- Wellcome Library

Content contributors have joined the project regularly since 2011; the MHL continues to seek additional content contributors.

- University of Toronto, Dentistry Library (Harry R. Abbott) (2014)
- University of Illinois at Chicago, Library of the Health Sciences, Special Collections (2014)
- Medical Center Archives of New York-Presbyterian/Weill-Cornell (2013)
- History of Modern Biomedicine Research Group (2013)
- Robert W. Woodruff Health Sciences Center Library at Emory University (2013)
- Robert D. Farber University Archives & Special Collections Department, Brandeis University (2012)
- National Institutes of Health Library (2012)
- University of California, San Francisco Legacy Tobacco Documents Library (2012)
- Wellcome Films (2012)
- Health Sciences and Human Services Library, University of Maryland, the Founding Campus (2012)
- Otis Historical Archives, National Museum of Health and Medicine (2012)
- Rudolph Matas Health Sciences Library, Tulane University (2012)
- University of Toronto Gerstein Science Information Centre (2012)
- Lamar Soutter Library, University of Massachusetts Medical School (2011)
- Ruth Lilly Medical Library, Indiana University School of Medicine (2022)

=== Timeline of the project ===
- 2010: MHL founded with grant (Medical Heritage Library Phase I) from the Sloan Foundation; initial digitization of medical history texts begins.
- 2011: MHL awarded a National Endowment for the Humanities Digital Humanities Level One Start-up Grant.
- 2012: MHL awarded a National Endowment for the Humanities grant (Expanding the Medical Heritage Library) for digitizing historic American medical journals received from National Endowment for the Humanities.
- 2012: MHL awarded a Mellon Foundation grant (Private Practices, Public Health) for processing archival collections via the Council on Library and Information Science.
