= Lifeline project =

British drug and alcohol abuse charity

Lifeline project was a British drug and alcohol abuse charity based in Manchester, established in 1971 by Eugenie Cheesmond and Rowdy Yates, with support from the Bishop of Manchester and the 8th Day Collective. Cheesmond had argued with the Board at Parkside Hospital in Macclesfield about rehabilitation for drug users when she was its Registrar Psychiatrist. Yates was an ex-addict cured by Cheesmond. Lifeline ran services across Yorkshire, the North East, the North West, London and the Midlands.

The charity supported 900 people in York with a staff of 50 recovery workers, criminal justice workers, young people's workers, nurses, doctors and volunteers. They were involved in Thames Valley Police’s initiative for Alcohol Harm Reduction Week in Oxford, aiming to keep students leaving home for the first time away from alcohol-related crime. It helped provide a safe haven for drunks and vulnerable people in Middlesbrough, designed to relieve pressure on the casualty department at James Cook University Hospital, freeing up A&E professionals to deal with emergencies. In December 2014, Manchester Mental Health and Social Care Trust won a contract to lead health services at HM Prison Manchester and HM Prison Buckley Hall in Rochdale. It worked with Lifeline to reduce drug and alcohol problems among prisoners.

Paul Flowers chaired Lifeline until 2014, when asked to resign over excessive expenses claims. On 19 May 2017, the charity collapsed, just after the Charity Commission for England and Wales launched an investigation into its financial controls. At that time it employed almost 1,500 people. CGL was expected to take over some of the staff and projects.
