= Armour Ashe =

Scottish footballer

Personal information
- Full name: Armour Donald Ashe
- Date of birth: 14 October 1925
- Place of birth: Paisley, Scotland
- Date of death: 15 June 1968 (aged 42)
- Place of death: Haslingden, England
- Position: Full back

Youth career
- 19xx–1949: Dalry Thistle

Senior career*
| Years | Team | Apps | (Gls) |
| 1949–1950 | Aberdeen | 1 | (0) |
| 1950–1953 | St Mirren | 21 | (0) |
| 1953 | Stockport County | 2 | (0) |
| 1953–1958 | Accrington Stanley | 162 | (0) |
| 1957–1959 | Gateshead | 54 | (1) |
| 1959–1960 | Southport | 14 | (2) |
| 1960– ? | Horwich RMI | ? | (?) |
| Total | | 254 | (3) |
- * Club domestic league appearances and goals

Armour Donald Ashe (14 October 1925 – 15 June 1968) was a Scottish professional footballer who played as a full back, making over 250 league appearances in both Scotland and England.

== Career ==
Born in Paisley, Ashe began his career with Dalry Thistle, before turning professional with Aberdeen in 1949. He also played for St Mirren, Stockport County, Accrington Stanley, Gateshead and Southport, and later played non-league football with Horwich RMI.
