= List of The Only Way Is Essex episodes =

The following is a list of episodes for the British reality series The Only Way Is Essex that first aired on ITV2 on 10 October 2010. From 2014 to 2025, the series aired on ITVBe, before moving back to ITV2 following the closure of the channel.

== Series overview ==
Series	Episodes	Originally aired	
Series	Episodes	First aired	Last aired
1	10	10 October 2010	10 November 2010
2	14	20 March 2011	4 May 2011
3	14	25 September 2011	9 November 2011
4	10	29 January 2012	29 February 2012
5	10	15 April 2012	27 May 2012
6	10	22 July 2012	22 August 2012
7	10	30 September 2012	30 October 2012
8	12	24 February 2013	3 April 2013
9	12	2 June 2013	10 July 2013
10	12	6 October 2013	13 November 2013
11	12	23 February 2014	2 April 2014
12	12	22 June 2014	30 July 2014
13	11	8 October 2014	12 November 2014
14	13	22 February 2015	5 April 2015
15	12	14 June 2015	22 July 2015
16	12	4 October 2015	11 November 2015
17	14	28 February 2016	13 April 2016
18	10	17 July 2016	17 August 2016
19	10	9 October 2016	9 November 2016
20	18	5 March 2017	3 May 2017
21	18	10 September 2017	8 November 2017
22	10	25 March 2018	27 May 2018
23	11	2 September 2018	11 November 2018
24	11	17 March 2019	19 May 2019
25	11	1 September 2019	10 November 2019
26	18	13 September 2020	11 November 2020
27	11	14 March 2021	23 May 2021
28	12	12 September 2021	14 November 2021
29	11	21 August 2022	30 October 2022
30	10	29 March 2023	28 May 2023
31	11	3 September 2023	12 November 2023
32	11	24 March 2024	2 June 2024
33	11	25 August 2024	3 November 2024
34	11	23 February 2025	4 May 2025
35	12	17 August 2025	22 September 2025
36	10	26 April 2026	25 May 2026
37	12	2 August 2026	7 September 2026

== Episodes ==
=== Series 1 (2010) ===
No. overall	No. in series	Title	Original release date	Duration	UK viewers
1	1	"Episode 1"	10 October 2010	60 minutes	1,144,000
2	2	"Episode 2"	13 October 2010	30 minutes	781,000
3	3	"Episode 3"	17 October 2010	30 minutes	896,000
4	4	"Episode 4"	20 October 2010	30 minutes	N/A
5	5	"Episode 5"	24 October 2010	30 minutes	675,000*
6	6	"Episode 6"	27 October 2010	30 minutes	954,000
7	7	"Episode 7"	31 October 2010	30 minutes	1,015,000
8	8	"Episode 8"	3 November 2010	30 minutes	852,000
9	9	"Episode 9"	7 November 2010	30 minutes	1,009,000
10	10	"Episode 10"	10 November 2010	60 minutes	975,000
11	11	"The Only Way Is Essexmas"	24 December 2010	60 minutes	973,000

=== Series 2 (2011) ===
No. overall	No. in series	Title	Original release date	Duration	UK viewers
12	1	"Episode 1"	20 March 2011	45 minutes	1,547,000
13	2	"Episode 2"	23 March 2011	45 minutes	807,000
14	3	"Episode 3"	27 March 2011	45 minutes	1,404,000
15	4	"Episode 4"	30 March 2011	45 minutes	1,219,000
16	5	"Episode 5"	3 April 2011	45 minutes	1,344,000
17	6	"Episode 6"	6 April 2011	45 minutes	1,352,000
18	7	"Episode 7"	10 April 2011	45 minutes	1,385,000
19	8	"Episode 8"	13 April 2011	45 minutes	1,686,000
20	9	"Episode 9"	17 April 2011	45 minutes	1,401,000
21	10	"Episode 10"	20 April 2011	45 minutes	1,755,000
22	11	"Episode 11"	24 April 2011	45 minutes	1,481,000
23	12	"Episode 12"	27 April 2011	45 minutes	1,759,000
24	13	"Episode 13"	1 May 2011	45 minutes	1,607,000
25	14	"Episode 14"	4 May 2011	60 minutes	1,858,000

=== Series 3 (2011) ===
No. overall	No. in series	Title	Original release date	Duration	UK viewers
26	1	"Episode 1"	25 September 2011	45 minutes	2,102,000
27	2	"Episode 2"	28 September 2011	45 minutes	1,474,000
28	3	"Episode 3"	2 October 2011	45 minutes	1,631,000
29	4	"Episode 4"	5 October 2011	45 minutes	1,646,000
30	5	"Episode 5"	9 October 2011	45 minutes	1,869,000
31	6	"Episode 6"	12 October 2011	45 minutes	1,576,000
32	7	"Episode 7"	16 October 2011	45 minutes	1,686,000
33	8	"Episode 8"	19 October 2011	45 minutes	1,676,000
34	9	"Episode 9"	23 October 2011	45 minutes	1,749,000
35	10	"Episode 10"	26 October 2011	45 minutes	1,680,000
36	11	"Episode 11"	30 October 2011	45 minutes	1,739,000
37	12	"Episode 12"	2 November 2011	45 minutes	1,910,000
38	13	"Episode 13"	6 November 2011	45 minutes	1,853,000
39	14	"Episode 14"	9 November 2011	60 minutes	2,210,000
40	15	"The Only Way Is Essexmas"	20 December 2011	60 minutes	1,893,000

=== Series 4 (2012) ===
No. overall	No. in series	Title	Original release date	Duration	UK viewers
41	1	"Episode 1"	29 January 2012	45 minutes	1,502,000
42	2	"Episode 2"	1 February 2012	45 minutes	1,492,000
43	3	"Episode 3"	5 February 2012	45 minutes	1,506,000
44	4	"Episode 4"	8 February 2012	45 minutes	1,478,000
45	5	"Episode 5"	12 February 2012	45 minutes	1,328,000
46	6	"Episode 6"	15 February 2012	45 minutes	1,576,000
47	7	"Episode 7"	19 February 2012	45 minutes	1,447,000
48	8	"Episode 8"	22 February 2012	45 minutes	1,488,000
49	9	"Episode 9"	26 February 2012	45 minutes	1,593,000
50	10	"Episode 10"	29 February 2012	45 minutes	1,768,000

=== Series 5 (2012) ===
No. overall	No. in series	Title	Original release date	Duration	UK viewers
51	1	"Episode 1"	15 April 2012	45 minutes	1,658,000
52	2	"Episode 2"	18 April 2012	45 minutes	1,571,000
53	3	"Episode 3"	22 April 2012	45 minutes	1,599,000
54	4	"Episode 4"	25 April 2012	45 minutes	1,686,000
55	5	"Episode 5"	29 April 2012	45 minutes	1,600,000
56	6	"Episode 6"	13 May 2012	45 minutes	1,738,000
57	7	"Episode 7"	16 May 2012	45 minutes	1,430,000
58	8	"Episode 8"	20 May 2012	45 minutes	1,456,000
59	9	"Episode 9"	23 May 2012	45 minutes	1,514,000
60	10	"Episode 10"	27 May 2012	45 minutes	1,506,000
61	11	"The Only Way Is Marbs"	13 June 2012	60 minutes	1,498,000

=== Series 6 (2012) ===
No. overall	No. in series	Title	Original release date	Duration	UK viewers
62	1	"Episode 1"	22 July 2012	45 minutes	1,484,000
63	2	"Episode 2"	25 July 2012	45 minutes	1,078,000
64	3	"Episode 3"	29 July 2012	45 minutes	1,115,000
65	4	"Episode 4"	1 August 2012	45 minutes	1,258,000
66	5	"Episode 5"	5 August 2012	45 minutes	1,515,000
67	6	"Episode 6"	8 August 2012	45 minutes	1,304,000
68	7	"Episode 7"	12 August 2012	45 minutes	958,000
69	8	"Episode 8"	15 August 2012	45 minutes	1,298,000
70	9	"Episode 9"	19 August 2012	45 minutes	1,564,000
71	10	"Episode 10"	22 August 2012	45 minutes	1,092,000

=== Series 7 (2012) ===
No. overall	No. in series	Title	Original release date	Duration	UK viewers
72	1	"Episode 1"	30 September 2012	45 minutes	1,397,000
73	2	"Episode 2"	3 October 2012	45 minutes	1,271,000
74	3	"Episode 3"	7 October 2012	45 minutes	1,672.000
75	4	"Episode 4"	10 October 2012	45 minutes	1,388,000
76	5	"Episode 5"	14 October 2012	45 minutes	1,457,000
77	6	"Episode 6"	17 October 2012	45 minutes	1,444,000
78	7	"Episode 7"	21 October 2012	45 minutes	1,606,000
79	8	"Episode 8"	24 October 2012	45 minutes	1,341,000
80	9	"Episode 9"	28 October 2012	45 minutes	1,527,000
81	10	"Episode 10"	31 October 2012	45 minutes	1,308,000
82	11	"Episode 11"	2 December 2012	50 minutes	1,564,000
83	12	"TOWIE Live"	3 December 2012	50 minutes	1,291,000
84	13	"The Only Way Is Essexmas"	19 December 2012	60 minutes	1,153,000

=== Series 8 (2013) ===
No. overall	No. in series	Title	Original release date	Duration	UK viewers
85	1	"Episode 1"	24 February 2013	50 minutes	1,470,000
86	2	"Episode 2"	27 February 2013	50 minutes	1,128,000*
87	3	"Episode 3"	3 March 2013	50 minutes	1,189,000*
88	4	"Episode 4"	6 March 2013	50 minutes	1,370,000
89	5	"Episode 5"	10 March 2013	50 minutes	1,274,000*
90	6	"Episode 6"	13 March 2013	50 minutes	1,234,000
91	7	"Episode 7"	17 March 2013	50 minutes	1,239,000
92	8	"Episode 8"	20 March 2013	50 minutes	1,276,000
93	9	"Episode 9"	24 March 2013	50 minutes	949,000*
94	10	"Episode 10"	27 March 2013	50 minutes	1,366,000
95	11	"Episode 11"	31 March 2013	50 minutes	1,526,000
96	12	"Episode 12"	3 April 2013	50 minutes	1,547,000

=== Series 9 (2013) ===
No. overall	No. in series	Title	Original release date	Duration	UK viewers
97	1	"The Only Way Is Marbs, Part 1"	2 June 2013	50 minutes	1,510,000*
98	2	"The Only Way Is Marbs, Part 2"	5 June 2013	50 minutes	1,527,000
99	3	"Episode 3"	9 June 2013	50 minutes	1,483,000
100	4	"Episode 4"	12 June 2013	50 minutes	1,148,000*
101	5	"Episode 5"	16 June 2013	50 minutes	1,152,000*
102	6	"Episode 6"	19 June 2013	50 minutes	1,355,000
103	7	"Episode 7"	23 June 2013	50 minutes	1,556,000
104	8	"Episode 8"	26 June 2013	50 minutes	1,207,000
105	9	"Episode 9"	30 June 2013	50 minutes	1,282,000*
106	10	"Episode 10"	3 July 2013	50 minutes	1,357,000
107	11	"Episode 11"	7 July 2013	50 minutes	1,276,000
108	12	"Episode 12"	10 July 2013	50 minutes	1,325,000

=== Series 10 (2013) ===
No. overall	No. in series	Title	Original release date	Duration	UK viewers
109	1	"The Only Way Is Vegas, Part 1"	6 October 2013	60 minutes	1,450,000
110	2	"The Only Way Is Vegas, Part 2"	9 October 2013	60 minutes	1,202,000
111	3	"Episode 3"	13 October 2013	50 minutes	1,339,000*
112	4	"Episode 4"	16 October 2013	50 minutes	1,379,000
113	5	"Episode 5"	20 October 2013	50 minutes	1,394,000
114	6	"Episode 6"	23 October 2013	50 minutes	1,338,000
115	7	"Episode 7"	27 October 2013	50 minutes	1,482,000
116	8	"Episode 8"	30 October 2013	50 minutes	1,330,000
117	9	"Episode 9"	3 November 2013	50 minutes	1,334,000
118	10	"Episode 10"	6 November 2013	50 minutes	1,365,000
119	11	"Episode 11"	10 November 2013	50 minutes	1,469,000
120	12	"Episode 12"	13 November 2013	50 minutes	1,424,000
121	13	"The Only Way Is Essexmas"	11 December 2013	60 minutes	1,271,000

=== Series 11 (2014) ===
No. overall	No. in series	Title	Original release date	Duration	UK viewers
122	1	"Episode 1"	23 February 2014	60 minutes	1,459,000
123	2	"Episode 2"	26 February 2014	50 minutes	1,191,000*
124	3	"Episode 3"	2 March 2014	50 minutes	1,474,000
125	4	"Episode 4"	5 March 2014	50 minutes	1,155,000*
126	5	"Episode 5"	9 March 2014	50 minutes	1,263,000*
127	6	"Episode 6"	12 March 2014	50 minutes	1,203,000
128	7	"Episode 7"	16 March 2014	50 minutes	1,558,000
129	8	"Episode 8"	19 March 2014	50 minutes	1,171,000*
130	9	"Episode 9"	23 March 2014	50 minutes	1,552,000
131	10	"Episode 10"	26 March 2014	50 minutes	1,524,000
132	11	"Episode 11"	30 March 2014	50 minutes	1,591,000
133	12	"Episode 12"	2 April 2014	50 minutes	1,568,000

=== Series 12 (2014) ===
No. overall	No. in series	Title	Original release date	Duration	UK viewers
134	1	"The Only Way Is Marbs, Part 1"	22 June 2014	60 minutes	1,582,000
135	2	"The Only Way Is Marbs, Part 2"	25 June 2014	60 minutes	1,433,000
136	3	"Episode 3"	29 June 2014	50 minutes	1,608,000
137	4	"Episode 4"	2 July 2014	50 minutes	1,454,000
138	5	"Episode 5"	6 July 2014	50 minutes	1,556,000
139	6	"Episode 6"	9 July 2014	50 minutes	1,515,000
140	7	"Episode 7"	13 July 2014	50 minutes	1,580,000
141	8	"Episode 8"	16 July 2014	50 minutes	1,427,000
142	9	"Episode 9"	20 July 2014	50 minutes	1,722,000
143	10	"Episode 10"	23 July 2014	50 minutes	1,542,000
144	11	"Episode 11"	27 July 2014	50 minutes	1,873,000
145	12	"Episode 12"	30 July 2014	50 minutes	1,684,000

=== Series 13 (2014) ===
No. overall	No. in series	Title	Original release date	Duration	UK viewers
146	1	"The Only Way Is Ibiza, Part 1"	8 October 2014	60 minutes	924,000
–	–	"TOWIE: All Back to Essex"	8 October 2014	60 minutes	513,000
147	2	"The Only Way Is Ibiza, Part 2"	12 October 2014	60 minutes	1,093,000
148	3	"Episode 3"	15 October 2014	50 minutes	916,000
149	4	"Episode 4"	19 October 2014	50 minutes	1,180,000
150	5	"Episode 5"	22 October 2014	50 minutes	1,027,000
151	6	"Episode 6"	26 October 2014	50 minutes	1,118,000
152	7	"Episode 7"	29 October 2014	50 minutes	1,077,000
153	8	"Episode 8"	2 November 2014	50 minutes	1,169,000
154	9	"Episode 9"	5 November 2014	50 minutes	1,071,000
155	10	"Episode 10"	9 November 2014	50 minutes	1,359,000
156	11	"Episode 11"	12 November 2014	50 minutes	1,103,000
156	11	"Episode 11"	12 November 2014	50 minutes	1,103,000
157	12	"The Only Way Is Essexmas"	10 December 2014	60 minutes	1,061,000

=== Series 14 (2015) ===
No. overall	No. in series	Title	Original release date	Duration	UK viewers
158	1	"Episode 1"	22 February 2015	60 minutes	1,025,000
–	–	"TOWIE: All Back to Essex"	22 February 2015	60 minutes	342,000
159	2	"Episode 2"	25 February 2015	50 minutes	815,000
160	3	"Episode 3"	1 March 2015	50 minutes	1,053,000
161	4	"Episode 4"	4 March 2015	50 minutes	853,000
162	5	"Episode 5"	8 March 2015	50 minutes	1,028,000
163	6	"Episode 6"	11 March 2015	50 minutes	953,000
164	7	"Episode 7"	15 March 2015	50 minutes	1,143,000
165	8	"Episode 8"	18 March 2015	50 minutes	948,000
166	9	"Episode 9"	22 March 2015	50 minutes	1,057,000
167	10	"Episode 10"	25 March 2015	50 minutes	957,000
168	11	"Episode 11"	29 March 2015	50 minutes	1,054,000
169	12	"Episode 12"	1 April 2015	50 minutes	1,007,000
170	13	"Episode 13"	5 April 2015	50 minutes	1,008,000

=== Series 15 (2015) ===
No. overall	No. in series	Title	Original release date	Duration	UK viewers
171	1	"The Only Way Is Marbs, Part 1"	14 June 2015	50 minutes	945,000
–	–	"TOWIE: All Back to Essex"	14 June 2015	60 minutes	–
172	2	"The Only Way Is Marbs, Part 2"	17 June 2015	50 minutes	840,000
173	3	"Episode 3"	21 June 2015	50 minutes	981,000
174	4	"Episode 4"	24 June 2015	50 minutes	820,000
175	5	"Episode 5"	28 June 2015	50 minutes	1,023,000
176	6	"Episode 6"	1 July 2015	50 minutes	979,000
177	7	"Episode 7"	5 July 2015	50 minutes	792,000
178	8	"Episode 8"	8 July 2015	50 minutes	963,000
179	9	"Episode 9"	12 July 2015	50 minutes	776,000
180	10	"Episode 10"	15 July 2015	50 minutes	1,014,000
181	11	"Episode 11"	19 July 2015	50 minutes	833,000
182	12	"Episode 12"	22 July 2015	50 minutes	951,000

=== Series 16 (2015) ===
No. overall	No. in series	Title	Original release date	Duration	UK viewers
183	1	"The Only Way Is Marbs, Part 1"	4 October 2015	50 minutes	941,000
–	–	"TOWIE: All Back to Essex"	4 October 2015	60 minutes	–
184	2	"The Only Way Is Marbs, Part 2"	7 October 2015	50 minutes	1,048,000
185	3	"Episode 3"	11 October 2015	50 minutes	1,176,000
186	4	"Episode 4"	14 October 2015	50 minutes	1,052,000
187	5	"Episode 5"	18 October 2015	50 minutes	1,122,000
188	6	"Episode 6"	21 October 2015	50 minutes	978,000
189	7	"Episode 7"	25 October 2015	50 minutes	1,166,000
190	8	"Episode 8"	28 October 2015	50 minutes	932,000
191	9	"Episode 9"	1 November 2015	50 minutes	1,029,000
192	10	"Episode 10"	4 November 2015	50 minutes	927,000
193	11	"Episode 11"	8 November 2015	50 minutes	1,181,000
194	12	"Episode 12"	11 November 2015	50 minutes	1,183,000
195	13	"The Only Way Is Essexmas"	16 December 2015	60 minutes	1,159,000

=== Series 17 (2016) ===
No. overall	No. in series	Title	Original release date	Duration	UK viewers
196	1	"Episode 1"	28 February 2016	50 minutes	982,000
197	2	"Episode 2"	2 March 2016	50 minutes	911,000
198	3	"Episode 3"	6 March 2016	50 minutes	1,107,000
199	4	"Episode 4"	9 March 2016	50 minutes	1,158,000
–	–	"The Power of TOWIE"	13 March 2016	60 minutes	482,000
200	5	"TOWIE: The 200th episode"	13 March 2016	60 minutes	1,121,000
201	6	"Episode 6"	16 March 2016	50 minutes	1,135,000
202	7	"Episode 7"	20 March 2016	50 minutes	1,115,000
203	8	"Episode 8"	23 March 2016	50 minutes	1,070,000
204	9	"Episode 9"	27 March 2016	50 minutes	1,095,000
205	10	"Episode 10"	30 March 2016	50 minutes	1,033,000
206	11	"Episode 11"	3 April 2016	50 minutes	1,242,000
207	12	"Episode 12"	6 April 2016	50 minutes	1,197,000
208	13	"Episode 13"	10 April 2016	50 minutes	1,261,000
209	14	"Episode 14"	13 April 2016	50 minutes	1,292,000

=== Series 18 (2016) ===
No. overall	No. in series	Title	Original release date	Duration	UK viewers
210	1	"The Only Way Is Mallorca, Part 1"	17 July 2016	60 minutes	1,114,000
211	2	"The Only Way Is Mallorca, Part 2"	20 July 2016	60 minutes	1,045,000
212	3	"Episode 3"	24 July 2016	50 minutes	1,110,000
213	4	"Episode 4"	27 July 2016	50 minutes	1,004,000
214	5	"Episode 5"	31 July 2016	50 minutes	1,037,000
215	6	"Episode 6"	3 August 2016	50 minutes	1,190,000
216	7	"Episode 7"	7 August 2016	50 minutes	1,012,000
217	8	"Episode 8"	10 August 2016	50 minutes	1,031,000
218	9	"Episode 9"	14 August 2016	50 minutes	988,000
219	10	"Episode 10"	17 August 2016	50 minutes	1,024,000

=== Series 19 (2016) ===
No. overall	No. in series	Title	Original release date	Duration	UK viewers
220	1	"The Only Way Is Marbs, Part 1"	9 October 2016	60 minutes	1,051,000
221	2	"The Only Way Is Marbs, Part 2"	12 October 2016	50 minutes	1,154,000
222	3	"Episode 3"	16 October 2016	50 minutes	1,036,000*
223	4	"Episode 4"	19 October 2016	50 minutes	1,105,000
224	5	"Episode 5"	23 October 2016	50 minutes	1,049,000
225	6	"Episode 6"	26 October 2016	50 minutes	1,062,000
226	7	"Episode 7"	30 October 2016	50 minutes	1,180,000
227	8	"Episode 8"	2 November 2016	50 minutes	1,103,000
228	9	"Episode 9"	6 November 2016	50 minutes	1,019,000
229	10	"Episode 10"	9 November 2016	50 minutes	1,084,000
230	11	"The Only Way is Essexmas, Part 1"	18 December 2016	60 minutes	967,000
231	12	"The Only Way Is Essexmas, Part 2"	19 December 2016	60 minutes	714,000

=== Series 20 (2017) ===
No. overall	No. in series	Title	Original release date	Duration	UK viewers
232	1	"Episode 1"	5 March 2017	60 minutes	1,107,000
233	2	"Episode 2"	8 March 2017	50 minutes	1,055,000
234	3	"Episode 3"	12 March 2017	50 minutes	1,166,000
235	4	"Episode 4"	15 March 2017	50 minutes	1,102,000
236	5	"Episode 5"	19 March 2017	60 minutes	1,087,000
237	6	"Episode 6"	22 March 2017	50 minutes	968,000
238	7	"Episode 7"	26 March 2017	60 minutes	1,022,000
239	8	"Episode 8"	29 March 2017	50 minutes	929,000
240	9	"Episode 9"	2 April 2017	50 minutes	1,017,000
241	10	"Episode 10"	5 April 2017	50 minutes	1,000,000
242	11	"Episode 11"	9 April 2017	50 minutes	1,139,000
243	12	"Episode 12"	12 April 2017	50 minutes	1,039,000
244	13	"Episode 13"	16 April 2017	50 minutes	994,000
245	14	"Episode 14"	19 April 2017	50 minutes	967,000
246	15	"Episode 15"	23 April 2017	50 minutes	1,041,000
247	16	"Episode 16"	26 April 2017	50 minutes	1,080,000
248	17	"Episode 17"	30 April 2017	50 minutes	1,125,000
249	18	"Episode 18"	3 May 2017	50 minutes	1,003,000

=== Series 21 (2017) ===
No. overall	No. in series	Title	Original release date	Duration	UK viewers
250	1	"The Only Way Is Marbs, Part 1"	10 September 2017	60 minutes	844,000
251	2	"The Only Way Is Marbs, Part 2"	13 September 2017	50 minutes	778,000
252	3	"Episode 3"	17 September 2017	50 minutes	921,000
253	4	"Episode 4"	20 September 2017	50 minutes	752,000
254	5	"Episode 5"	24 September 2017	50 minutes	826,000
255	6	"Episode 6"	27 September 2017	50 minutes	656,000
256	7	"Episode 7"	1 October 2017	60 minutes	928,000
257	8	"Episode 8"	4 October 2017	50 minutes	817,000
258	9	"Episode 9"	8 October 2017	50 minutes	868,000
259	10	"Episode 10"	11 October 2017	50 minutes	907,000
260	11	"Episode 11"	15 October 2017	50 minutes	945,000
261	12	"Episode 12"	18 October 2017	50 minutes	837,000
262	13	"Episode 13"	22 October 2017	50 minutes	989,000
263	14	"Episode 14"	25 October 2017	50 minutes	820,000
264	15	"Episode 15"	29 October 2017	60 minutes	910,000
265	16	"Episode 16"	1 November 2017	50 minutes	869,000
266	17	"Episode 17"	5 November 2017	50 minutes	970,000
267	18	"The Only Way Is Essexmas"	17 December 2017	60 minutes	768,000

=== Series 22 (2018) ===
No. overall	No. in series	Title	Original release date	Duration	UK viewers
268	1	"The Only Way Is Barcelona"	25 March 2018	60 minutes	986,000
269	2	"Episode 2"	1 April 2018	60 minutes	976,000
270	3	"Episode 3"	8 April 2018	60 minutes	1,087,000
271	4	"Episode 4"	15 April 2018	60 minutes	971,000
272	5	"Episode 5"	22 April 2018	60 minutes	1,021,000
273	6	"Episode 6"	29 April 2018	60 minutes	1,036,000
274	7	"Episode 7"	6 May 2018	60 minutes	1,014,000
275	8	"Episode 8"	13 May 2018	60 minutes	1,000,000
276	9	"Episode 9"	20 May 2018	60 minutes	1,030,000
277	10	"Episode 10"	27 May 2018	60 minutes	841,000

=== Series 23 (2018) ===
No. overall	No. in series	Title	Original release date	Duration	UK viewers
278	1	"TOWIE: Italia"	2 September 2018	60 minutes	993,000
279	2	"Episode 2"	9 September 2018	60 minutes	1,027,000
280	3	"Episode 3"	16 September 2018	60 minutes	1,091,000
281	4	"Episode 4"	23 September 2018	60 minutes	1,214,000
282	5	"Episode 5"	30 September 2018	60 minutes	1,133,000
283	6	"Episode 6"	7 October 2018	60 minutes	1,088,000
284	7	"Episode 7"	14 October 2018	60 minutes	1,229,000
285	8	"Episode 8"	21 October 2018	60 minutes	1,016,000
286	9	"Episode 9"	28 October 2018	60 minutes	1,152,000
287	10	"Episode 10"	4 November 2018	60 minutes	1,128,000
288	11	"Episode 11"	11 November 2018	60 minutes	1,166,000

=== Series 24 (2019) ===
No. overall	No. in series	Title	Original release date	Duration	UK viewers
289	1	"TOWIE: Thailand Part 1"	17 March 2019	60 minutes	913,000
290	2	"TOWIE: Thailand Part 2"	24 March 2019	60 minutes	938,000
291	3	"Episode 3"	31 March 2019	60 minutes	919,000
292	4	"Episode 4"	7 April 2019	60 minutes	1,067,000
293	5	"Episode 5"	14 April 2019	60 minutes	1,032,000
294	6	"Episode 6"	21 April 2019	60 minutes	1,058,000
295	7	"Episode 7"	28 April 2019	60 minutes	1,031,000
296	8	"Episode 8"	5 May 2019	60 minutes	960,000
297	9	"Episode 9"	12 May 2019	60 minutes	879,000
298	10	"Episode 10"	19 May 2019	60 minutes	835,000
299	11	"Episode 11"	26 May 2019	60 minutes	879,000

=== Series 25 (2019) ===
No. overall	No. in series	Title	Original release date	Duration	UK viewers
300	1	"Episode 1"	1 September 2019	60 minutes	1,009,000
301	2	"Episode 2"	8 September 2019	60 minutes	983,000
302	3	"Episode 3"	15 September 2019	60 minutes	913,000
303	4	"Episode 4"	22 September 2019	60 minutes	967,000
304	5	"Episode 5: Marbella"	29 September 2019	60 minutes	1,099,000
305	6	"Episode 6: Marbella"	6 October 2019	60 minutes	977,000
306	7	"Episode 7"	13 October 2019	60 minutes	990,000
307	8	"Episode 8"	20 October 2019	60 minutes	980,000
308	9	"Episode 9"	27 October 2019	60 minutes	926,000
309	10	"Episode 10"	3 November 2019	60 minutes	1,058,934
310	11	"Episode 11"	10 November 2019	60 minutes	996,000
311	12	"The Only Way Is Essexmas"	15 December 2019	60 minutes	610,000

=== Series 26 (2020) ===
No. overall	No. in series	Title	Original release date	Duration	UK viewers
–	–	"TOWIE Turns 10: All Back to Essex"	6 September 2020	60 minutes	389,000
312	1	"Episode 1"	13 September 2020	60 minutes	821,000
313	2	"Episode 2"	16 September 2020	60 minutes	693,000
314	3	"Episode 3"	20 September 2020	60 minutes	790,000
315	4	"Episode 4"	23 September 2020	60 minutes	831,000
316	5	"Episode 5"	27 September 2020	60 minutes	798,000
317	6	"Episode 6"	30 September 2020	60 minutes	848,000
318	7	"Episode 7"	4 October 2020	60 minutes	885,000
319	8	"Episode 8"	7 October 2020	60 minutes	759,000
320	9	"Episode 9"	11 October 2020	75 minutes	727,000
321	10	"Episode 10"	14 October 2020	60 minutes	683,000
322	11	"Episode 11"	18 October 2020	60 minutes	716,000
323	12	"Episode 12"	21 October 2020	60 minutes	830,000
324	13	"Episode 13"	25 October 2020	60 minutes	781,000
325	14	"Episode 14"	28 October 2020	60 minutes	677,000
326	15	"Episode 15"	1 November 2020	60 minutes	726,000
327	16	"Episode 16"	4 November 2020	60 minutes	614,000
328	17	"Episode 17"	8 November 2020	60 minutes	659,000
329	18	"Episode 18"	11 November 2020	60 minutes	590,000
330	19	"The Only Way Is Essexmas"	11 November 2020	80 minutes	781,000

=== Series 27 (2021) ===
No. overall	No. in series	Title	Original release date	Duration	UK viewers
331	1	"Episode 1"	14 March 2021	60 minutes	592,000
332	2	"Episode 2"	21 March 2021	60 minutes	524,000
333	3	"Episode 3"	28 March 2021	60 minutes	595,000
334	4	"Episode 4"	4 April 2021	60 minutes	618,000
335	5	"Episode 5"	11 April 2021	60 minutes	607,000
336	6	"Episode 6"	18 April 2021	60 minutes	606,000
337	7	"Episode 7"	25 April 2021	60 minutes	541,000
338	8	"Episode 8"	2 May 2021	60 minutes	538,000
339	9	"Episode 9"	9 May 2021	60 minutes	570,000
340	10	"Episode 10"	16 May 2021	60 minutes	591,000
341	11	"Episode 11"	23 May 2021	60 minutes	539,000

=== Series 28 (2021) ===
No. overall	No. in series	Title	Original release date	Duration	UK viewers
342	1	"Episode 1"	12 September 2021	60 minutes	394,000
343	2	"Episode 2"	19 September 2021	60 minutes	422,000
344	3	"Episode 3"	26 September 2021	60 minutes	447,000
345	4	"Episode 4"	3 October 2021	60 minutes	424,000
346	5	"Episode 5"	10 October 2021	60 minutes	355,000
347	6	"Episode 6"	17 October 2021	60 minutes	430,000
348	7	"Episode 7"	24 October 2021	60 minutes	490,000
349	8	"Episode 8"	31 October 2021	60 minutes	434,000
350	9	"Episode 9"	7 November 2021	60 minutes	411,000
351	10	"Episode 10"	14 November 2021	60 minutes	431,000
352	11	"The Only Way is Essexmas, Part 1"	15 December 2021	60 minutes	305,000
353	12	"The Only Way is Essexmas, Part 2"	16 December 2021	60 minutes	265,000

=== Series 29 (2022) ===
No. overall	No. in series	Title	Original release date	Duration
354	1	"Episode 1"	21 August 2022	60 minutes
355	2	"Episode 2"	28 August 2022	60 minutes
356	3	"Episode 3"	4 September 2022	60 minutes
357	4	"Episode 4"	11 September 2022	60 minutes
358	5	"Episode 5"	18 September 2022	60 minutes
359	6	"Episode 6"	25 September 2022	60 minutes
360	7	"Episode 7"	2 October 2022	60 minutes
361	8	"Episode 8"	9 October 2022	60 minutes
362	9	"Episode 9"	16 October 2022	60 minutes
363	10	"Episode 10"	23 October 2022	60 minutes
364	11	"Episode 11"	30 October 2022	60 minutes

=== Series 30 (2023) ===
No. overall	No. in series	Title	Original release date	Duration
365	1	"Episode 1"	26 March 2023	60 minutes
366	2	"Episode 2"	2 April 2023	60 minutes
367	3	"Episode 3"	9 April 2023	60 minutes
368	4	"Episode 4"	16 April 2023	60 minutes
369	5	"Episode 5"	23 April 2023	60 minutes
370	6	"Episode 6"	30 April 2023	60 minutes
371	7	"Episode 7"	7 May 2023	60 minutes
372	8	"Episode 8"	14 May 2023	60 minutes
373	9	"Episode 9"	21 May 2023	60 minutes
374	10	"Episode 10"	28 May 2023	60 minutes

=== Series 31 (2023) ===
No. overall	No. in series	Title	Original release date	Duration
375	1	"Episode 1"	3 September 2023	60 minutes
376	2	"Episode 2"	10 September 2023	60 minutes
377	3	"Episode 3"	17 September 2023	60 minutes
378	4	"Episode 4"	24 September 2023	60 minutes
379	5	"Episode 5"	1 October 2023	60 minutes
380	6	"Episode 6"	8 October 2023	60 minutes
381	7	"Episode 7"	15 October 2023	60 minutes
382	8	"Episode 8"	22 October 2023	60 minutes
383	9	"Episode 9"	29 October 2023	60 minutes
384	10	"Episode 10"	5 November 2023	60 minutes
385	11	"Episode 11"	12 November 2023	60 minutes

=== Series 32 (2024) ===
No. overall	No. in series	Title	Original release date	Duration
386	1	"Episode 1"	24 March 2024	60 minutes
387	2	"Episode 2"	31 March 2024	60 minutes
388	3	"Episode 3"	7 April 2024	60 minutes
389	4	"Episode 4"	14 April 2024	60 minutes
390	5	"Episode 5"	21 April 2024	60 minutes
391	6	"Episode 6"	28 April 2024	60 minutes
392	7	"Episode 7"	5 May 2024	60 minutes
393	8	"Episode 8"	12 May 2024	60 minutes
394	9	"Episode 9"	19 May 2024	60 minutes
395	10	"Episode 10"	26 May 2024	60 minutes
396	11	"Episode 11"	2 June 2024	60 minutes

=== Series 33 (2024) ===
No. overall	No. in series	Title	Original release date	Duration
397	1	"Episode 1"	25 August 2024	60 minutes
398	2	"Episode 2"	1 September 2024	60 minutes
399	3	"Episode 3"	8 September 2024	60 minutes
400	4	"Episode 4"	15 September 2024	60 minutes
401	5	"Episode 5"	22 September 2024	60 minutes
402	6	"Episode 6"	29 September 2024	60 minutes
403	7	"Episode 7"	6 October 2024	60 minutes
404	8	"Episode 8"	13 October 2024	60 minutes
405	9	"Episode 9"	20 October 2024	60 minutes
406	10	"Episode 10"	27 October 2024	60 minutes
407	11	"Episode 11"	3 November 2024	60 minutes

=== Series 34 (2025) ===
No. overall	No. in series	Title	Original release date	Duration
408	1	"Episode 1"	23 February 2025	60 minutes
409	2	"Episode 2"	2 March 2025	60 minutes
410	3	"Episode 3"	9 March 2025	60 minutes
411	4	"Episode 4"	16 March 2025	60 minutes
412	5	"Episode 5"	23 March 2025	60 minutes
413	6	"Episode 6"	30 March 2025	60 minutes
414	7	"Episode 7"	6 April 2025	60 minutes
415	8	"Episode 8"	13 April 2025	60 minutes
416	9	"Episode 9"	20 April 2025	60 minutes
417	10	"Episode 10"	27 April 2025	60 minutes
418	11	"Episode 11"	4 May 2025	60 minutes

=== Series 35 (2025) ===
No. overall	No. in series	Title	Original release date	Duration
419	1	"Episode 1"	17 August 2025	60 minutes
420	2	"Episode 2"	18 August 2025	60 minutes
421	3	"Episode 3"	24 August 2025	60 minutes
422	4	"Episode 4"	25 August 2025	60 minutes
423	5	"Episode 5"	31 August 2025	60 minutes
424	6	"Episode 6"	1 September 2025	60 minutes
425	7	"Episode 7"	7 September 2025	60 minutes
426	8	"Episode 8"	8 September 2025	60 minutes
427	9	"Episode 9"	14 September 2025	60 minutes
428	10	"Episode 10"	15 September 2025	60 minutes
429	11	"Episode 11"	21 September 2025	60 minutes
430	12	"Episode 12"	22 September 2025	60 minutes

=== Series 36 (2026) ===
No. overall	No. in series	Title	Original release date	Duration
434	1	"Episode 1"	26 April 2026	60 minutes
435	2	"Episode 2"	27 April 2026	60 minutes
436	3	"Episode 3"	3 May 2026	60 minutes
437	4	"Episode 4"	4 May 2026	60 minutes
438	5	"Episode 5"	10 May 2026	60 minutes
439	6	"Episode 6"	11 May 2026	60 minutes
440	7	"Episode 7"	17 May 2026	60 minutes
441	8	"Episode 8"	18 May 2026	60 minutes
442	9	"Episode 9"	24 May 2026	60 minutes
443	10	"Episode 10"	25 May 2026	60 minutes

=== Series 37 (2026) ===
No. overall	No. in series	Title	Original release date	Duration
444	1	"Episode 1"	2 August 2026	60 minutes
445	2	"Episode 2"	3 August 2026	60 minutes
446	3	"Episode 3"	9 August 2026	60 minutes
447	4	"Episode 4"	10 August 2026	60 minutes
448	5	"Episode 5"	16 August 2026	60 minutes
449	6	"Episode 6"	17 August 2026	60 minutes
450	7	"Episode 7"	23 August 2026	60 minutes
451	8	"Episode 8"	24 August 2026	60 minutes
452	9	"Episode 9"	30 August 2026	60 minutes
453	10	"Episode 10"	31 August 2026	60 minutes
454	11	"Episode 11"	6 September 2026	60 minutes
455	12	"Episode 12"	7 September 2026	60 minutes

== Specials ==
No.	Title	Original release date	UK viewers (millions)	Duration
1	"Totally Vajazzled"	8 December 2010	N/A	60 minutes
The best bits of the first series also with previously unseen footage.
2	"Ghosthunting With... The Only Way Is Essex"	14 September 2011	593,000	90 minutes
It was announced on 31 August 2011 that some of the cast from The Only Way Is Essex will join Yvette Fielding in a revived version of the series exploring Essex's Coalhouse Fort, Joining Yvette are Harry Derbidge, Sam Faiers, Joey Essex, Amy Childs, Mark Wright and James "Arg" Argent.
3	"TOWIE: Reem All About It"	21 September 2011	683,000	60 minutes
A special look back at Series 1 and Series 2 of The Only Way Is Essex, including interviews with the cast who explain the show's impact on their lives and its impact on the viewing public.
