= Chris Aspin =

English author and historian (1933–2024)

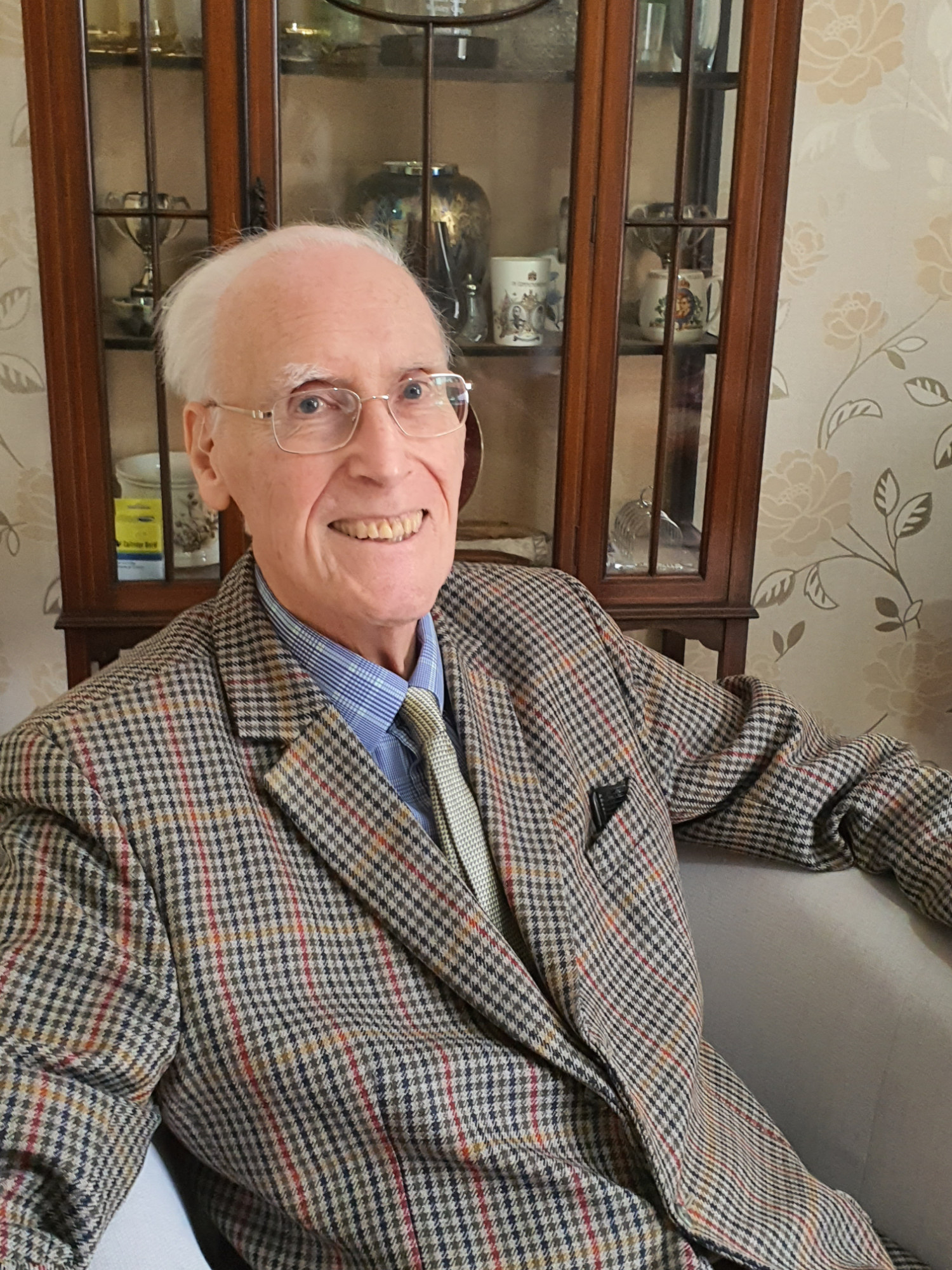
- Born: 1 February 1933; Rossendale, Lancashire, England
- Died: 2 February 2024 (aged 91); Blackburn, Lancashire, England
- Occupations: Historian, author, journalist
- Known for: Writings on the textile industry
- Notable work: The Water-Spinners; A New Look at the Early Cotton Trade; The First Industrial Society: Social History of Lancashire, 1750–1850

Christopher Aspin (1 February 1933 – 2 February 2024) was an English author, historian, and journalist. Among his published works are a biography of James Hargreaves, inventor of the spinning jenny, and The First Industrial Society: Social History of Lancashire, 1750–1850, a study of the social aspects of the Industrial Revolution. Aspin had a lifelong interest in local history and the history of the Lancashire textile industry in particular.

== Life and career ==
Aspin spent his life in Helmshore, a small mill-town immediately south of Haslingden, Rossendale. In his 2003 memoir Just A Few Words: A Helmshore Boyhood he describes a friendly, polite, thrifty and hard-working community "...one half of the village being church and Tory, the other half chapel and Liberal". He writes warmly of his childhood memories, and how his family, friends and relatives were closely integrated into the discipline of the textile mills that provided most of the population with employment.

Aspin attended Helmshore Council School and, after a period during the war when he was often seriously ill, he passed a scholarship examination and started at Haslingden Grammar School in 1944. At school his passion for cricket developed, and Haslingden Cricket Club's ground was just a short walk away. Here he was able to see the international professionals who played for the club as part of the Lancashire Cricket League, which gradually became an important part of his life. He wrote on league cricket for Wisden for the past 40 years, and acted as the Secretary of Haslingden Cricket Club for more than 40 years; he has a suite named after him at the club.

After school Aspin undertook National Service in the RAF and, on completing this, he formed Helmshore Local History Society with his friend Derek Pilkington. In 1949 Aspin started work as a journalist, including the Lancashire Telegraph. Most of his working life was spent at the Manchester Evening News where he wrote on business, finance and music. He also acted as local correspondent for The Times, The Guardian, and The Daily Telegraph. He retired from journalism in 1993, but continued to research and write books. During the 1960s, with Derek Pilkington and others, he helped with the transition of Higher Mill, Helmshore, into its role as Higher Mill Textile Museum.

Aspin died after a short illness in Blackburn, Lancashire on 2 February 2024.

== Writings ==
Throughout his writing Aspin returned over and over to the ways in which Haslingden and Helmshore have changed and developed over the last century. Both places grew enormously during the Industrial Revolution, and were famous for the production of woollen and cotton goods. Many of his books record the rise and fall of the mills, which once dominated the skyline; the move away from railways to motorways; and the overall changes of the last half century, in which time Haslingden and Helmshore have become large residential areas for people commuting to Manchester and other nearby towns. His The Water-Spinners, A New Look at the Early Cotton Trade, records his search for the sites of mills that used Sir Richard Arkwright's machines. The Golden Valley describes Rossendale's most important years. Aspin was also concerned with the civic and spiritual life of the community, as well as with sports (especially cricket) and other pastimes. His second book was a history of Haslingden Cricket Club in the Victorian Era, which was reviewed by John Arlott in Wisden. Aspin also wrote the popular Shire Publications guides to both the woollen and the cotton industries.

Aspin's research in the 1970s on poverty in working-class Salford, Manchester and elsewhere in Lancashire led to the journalist Stanley Graham's writings on cholera and sanitation in the slums. Aspin contributed articles on cotton pioneers James Hargreaves, James Thomson and John Bullough, to the Oxford Dictionary of National Biography.

At the age of 70 Aspin wrote, Just a Few Words: A Helmshore Boyhood, remembering 50 years of thoughts and feelings of living in Helmshore throughout the 30s and 40s. He also authored, sometimes in partnership with another local historian, John Simpson, several books of historic photographs of the district. After retiring Aspin wrote over a thousand light verses, published by Royd Publications and Carnegie Scotforth.

As well as his writings on local and textile history and heritage, Aspin wrote a number of short books for children and young people. During his later years he also wrote booklets of ghosts and hauntings (typically taking place within Rossendale), and was a member of the Society for Psychical Research.

== Bibliography ==
- Haslingden 1800 – 1900, 1962, Helmshore Local History Society (HLHS)
- James Hargreaves & the Spinning Jenny, 1964, Helmshore Local History Society ISBN 978-0950072548
- The First Industrial Society: Social History of Lancashire 1750–1850, 1969, Helmshore Local History Society
- The Turners of Helmshore and Higher Mill, 1970, Higher Mill Museum Trust
- Gone Cricket Mad: The Haslingden Club in the Victorian Era, 1976, HLHS ISBN 978-0950072586
- Helmshore: 1977, with Derek Pilkington, Helmshore Local History Society
- Haslingden, 1979, with Derek Pilkington, Helmshore Local History Society, ISBN 0906881005, 9780906881002
- Mr. Pilling's Short Cut to China and Other Stories of Rossendale Enterprise, 1983, HLHS ISBN 978-0-906881-02-6
- Surprising Rossendale, 1986, HLHS ISBN 978-0906881033
- Dizzy Heights: Story of Lancashire's First Flying Men, 1988, HLHS ISBN 0-906881-04-8
- Surprising Lancashire, 1988, HLHS ISBN 0-906881-05-6
- Memories of Village Life, 1992, with John Simpson, HLHS ISBN 978-0906881064
- Haslingden and District in Old Picture Postcards, 1992, with John Simpson, Europese Bibliotheek ISBN 9028853596
- Rawtenstall and District in Old Picture Postcards, 1993, with John Simpson, Europese Bibliotheek
- The First Industrial Society: Social History of Lancashire 1750–1850, revised and expanded edition 1998, Carnegie ISBN 1-85936-016-5
- Helmshore, revised and expanded edition 2000, with Derek Pilkington and John Simpson, HLHS ISBN 9780906881071
- The Spirit of Haslingden and Helmshore: The 20th Century in Photographs, 2002, with John Simpson, (hardback), Landmark ISBN 184306071X
- Just a Few Words: A Helmshore Boyhood, 2003. HLHS, ISBN 0906881129
- The Cotton Industry, 2003, Shire Library, Bloomsbury ISBN 9780852635452 originally published 1981 (list ref 63)
- Smile Please, 2004, Tor Press ISBN 9780906881149
- The Spirit of Haslingden and Helmshore: The 20th Century in Photographs, 2004, with John Simpson, (softback) Landmark ISBN 1843061570, 9781843061571
- How Now Brown Cow, 2005, Tor Press
- The Woollen Industry, 2006, Shire Library, Bloomsbury ISBN 9780852635988 originally published 1982, (list ref 81)
- The War of the Roses, 2006, Tor Press ISBN 978-0906881163
- Fabrics, Filth and Fairy Tents Angus Bethune Reach, Ed. Chris Aspin 2007, Royd Press ISBN 0-9556204-0-6
- What Happened to the Iceberg, 2007, Tor Press ISBN 0-906881-18-8
- The Jingle Book: Nonsense Verse and a Diabolical Story, 2007, Royd Press ISBN 9780955620454
- A Cotton-Fibre Halo: Manchester and the Textile Districts in 1849, Angus Bethune Reach, Ed. Chris Aspin 2007, Royd Press ISBN 0-9556204-4-9
- A Load of New Rubbish, 2008, Royd Press ISBN 9780955620492
- The Fastest Man: Steeple Jack's Adventures in Lancashire, 2009, HLHS ISBN 9780906881200
- Albert, the Lion and the Monkey, 2009, Royd Press ISBN 9781907197017
- The Owl and the Pussy-cat: New Light on an Old Legend, 2010, Royd Press ISBN 9781907197031
- Haslingden and Helmshore Through Time, 2010, with John Simpson, Amberley ISBN 9781848686564
- The Unfortunate Philanthropists, 2010, HLHS ISBN 9780906881217
- The Pied Pipe Man of Haslingden, 2011, Royd Press ISBN 9781907197048
- The Decoy: How the Portuguese Learned to Spin Like Arkwright, 2012, HLHS ISBN 9780906881224
- The Stair Lift Olympics: A Farrago of Nonsense, 2012, Royd Press ISBN 9781907197086
- The Tuneful Foghorns: Light Verse for Lighthouse Keepers, 2012, Royd Press ISBN 9781907197093
- The Water-spinners: A New Look at the Early Cotton Trade, 2013, HLHS ISBN 0906881137 originally published 2003
- Treasure Island – the Sequel: and Other Ludicrous Lines, 2013, Royd Press ISBN 9781907197123
- Strange Stories from a Lancashire Village, 2014, HLHS
- More Flights of Fancy, 2014, Royd Press ISBN 9781907197130
- Out of This World – Cricket as You've Never Known it, 2015, Royd Press ISBN 9781907197147
- A Nosegay of Nonsense, 2015, Royd Press ISBN 9781907197154
- True Stories of Our Local Ghosts, 2015, HLHS
- Strange, but True: More Stories of Curious Encounters, 2016
- What the Butler Saw, 2016
- Brush up Your Shakespeare, 2017, Carnegie Scotforth
- More Strange Encounters, 2018
- Nessie in Wonderland, 2018
- The Golden Valley: When Rossendale Led the World, 2018, Carnegie Pub. ISBN 9781910837153
- Just a Few Extras: A Few No-balls and Wides, 2018, Carnegie Scotforth
- A Day at the Races, 2018 Carnegie Scotforth
- Who Burnt The Cakes, 2019 Tor Press
- The Road to Ruin, 2020 Tor Press
- Lockdown Lyrics, 2020 Tor Press
- Virus Verses, 2020 Tor Press
- Strange Things Happen, 2021 Helmshore Local History Society ISBN 9780906881316
- A Lighter Look at Life, 2021 Tor Press
