= Johnny Curran =

Scottish footballer (1924–1985)

Personal information
- Full name: John Curran
- Date of birth: 22 June 1924
- Place of birth: Glasgow, Scotland
- Date of death: 24 March 1985 (aged 60)
- Place of death: Milltimber, Scotland
- Position: Goalkeeper

Senior career*
Years	Team	Apps	(Gls)
1947–1948	Queen's Park	8	(0)
1948–1951	Aberdeen	27	(0)
1951–1956	East Fife	156	(0)
1956–1957	Shrewsbury Town	24	(0)
1957–1958	Watford	30	(0)
Total		245	(0)
- * Club domestic league appearances and goals

Johnny Curran (22 June 1924 – 24 March 1985) was a Scottish football goalkeeper. He played for Queen's Park, Aberdeen, East Fife, Shrewsbury Town and Watford. From Watford, Curran moved into the Scottish Highland Football to Keith FC, the Banffshire Club
