= Eric Bakie =

Scottish footballer and civil servant

Personal information
- Date of birth: 6 January 1928
- Place of birth: Edinburgh, Scotland
- Date of death: 13 May 2015 (aged 87)
- Place of death: Edinburgh, Scotland
- Position: Left half

Youth career
- North Merchiston Boys Club

Senior career*
Years	Team	Apps	(Gls)
- Hutchinson Vale
1949–1951	Aberdeen	3	(0)
1951–1957	Dunfermline Athletic	90	(3)
1957–1958	St Johnstone	28	(0)
1958–1963	Duns		
Total		121	(3)
- * Club domestic league appearances and goals

Eric Bakie (6 January 1928 – 13 May 2015) was a Scottish footballer and civil servant.

== Early life ==
Bakie was born in Edinburgh and grew up supporting local club Heart of Midlothian. One of his neighbours as a child was Lawrie Reilly, who later played for Scotland; the two remained lifelong friends. He attended North Merchiston Primary School before winning a bursary to the Royal High School. During his childhood he played for North Merchiston Boys Club, and he represented Scotland's Boys Clubs in matches against Wales and England. After leaving school he joined the Ministry of Labour as a civil servant. Bakie completed his national service in Cairo as a staff sergeant.

== Football career ==
After completing his national service Bakie joined Hutchinson Vale in Edinburgh. He combined his football career with his job in the Ministry of Labour; in 1949 he was close to moving to London for work, and received interest from Arsenal. However, he remained in Scotland and instead signed for Aberdeen. He continued to live in Edinburgh, where he trained in the evenings at Hibernian's ground, and travelled to Aberdeen on Saturdays, the only time he saw his teammates. His debut for Aberdeen came in a 5–0 victory against Motherwell on 17 December 1949. Bakie struggled to secure a first-team place at Aberdeen due to his part-time status, and he was released on a free transfer in 1951. He made only three appearances for Aberdeen in the Scottish Football League during his two years with the club.

Bakie then signed for Dunfermline Athletic, still combining his football career with his civil service job. His contract at Dunfermline in the 1950s was "a minimum of £4 per week." He spent 6 seasons at Dunfermline and was their joint longest-serving player, alongside Ron Mailer. During his time with Dunfermline he scored 3 goals in 90 appearances in the league. After a season with St Johnstone, with whom he made 28 league appearances, he then dropped out of the league system to play for Duns, winning the Scottish Qualifying Cup on two occasions with them. He finally retired in 1963. He made a total of 121 league appearances for Aberdeen, Dunfermline Athletic and St Johnstone, and over 160 appearances for them in all competitions.

== Later life and death ==
Bakie remained at the Ministry of Labour throughout his working life. After retiring, he played golf and bowls. He died in Edinburgh on 13 May 2015, at the age of 87. He left behind his wife and two children.
