= Haslingden =

Town in Rossendale, Lancashire, England

Coordinates: 53.705°N 2.328°W

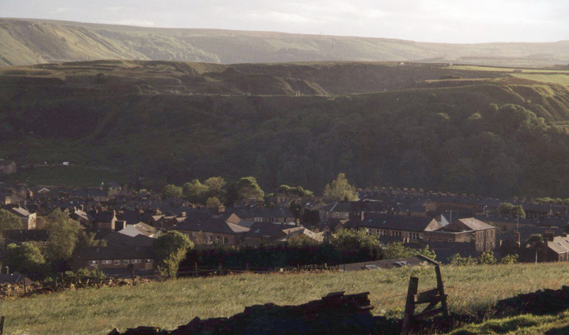
- A view of Haslingden in 2004

- Shown within Rossendale Location within Lancashire
- Population: 16,849 (2001 Census)
- OS grid reference: SD783232
- District: Rossendale
- Shire county: Lancashire
- Region: North West
- Country: England
- Sovereign state: United Kingdom
- Post town: ROSSENDALE
- Postcode district: BB4
- Dialling code: 01706
- Police: Lancashire
- Fire: Lancashire
- Ambulance: North West
- UK Parliament: Hyndburn; Rossendale and Darwen

Haslingden /ˈhæzlɪŋdən/ is a town in the borough of Rossendale, Lancashire, England. It lies 16 miles (26 km) north of Manchester. At the time of the 2021 census, the town (including Helmshore) had a population of 15,969. The town is surrounded by high moorland: 370 metres (1,210 ft) to the north; 396 metres (1,299 ft) Cribden to the east; and 418 metres (1,371 ft) Bull Hill to the south.

The town is the birthplace of the industrialist John Cockerill (1790–1840) and the composer Alan Rawsthorne (1905–1971); it was the home for many years of the Irish Republican leader, Michael Davitt (1846–1906). Haslingden Cricket Club is a member of the Lancashire League.

== Toponymy ==
The name Hadlingden means 'valley of the hazels' or 'valley growing with hazels'.

== History ==
Arms of the former Haslingden Borough Council

There is some evidence of Bronze Age human presence in the area of Haslingden. Thirteen Stones Hill is 2 km (1.2 mi) west of the town and probably dates from about 3000BC. There is now just one stone visible.

Part of what is now Haslingden, along with the neighbouring towns of Rawtenstall and Bacup, were part of the Forest of Rossendale, itself part of the Forest of Blackburnshire. During the late 13th and 14th centuries, the forest was a hunting park; the term 'Forest' referred to it being parkland rather than being heavily wooded, as the forest declined much earlier during the Neolithic period. The Forest of Rossendale contained eleven vaccaries (cow pastures) and was poorly populated, with Haslingden being the only town of significance and possessed of a church.

Haslingden appears to have held markets during the 16th century, with the first reference in a Court Roll of 1555 where it records a John Radcliffe being fined for being a 'forestaller of the lords market of Haslyngden'. There are later references to markets and fairs in The Shuttleworth Accounts (1582-1621) and the map-maker Richard Blome writing in 1673 describes Haslingden as originally having 'a small Market-town on Wednesdays', and later, at the time of Charles I, the market had been moved to Saturday. The market continued to grow and Haslingden was designated a market town in 1676. It became a coaching station and a significant industrial borough during the Industrial Revolution. Haslingden benefitted in particular with the mechanisation of the wool and cotton spinning and weaving industries from the 18th to the 19th centuries, and the development of watermills, and later steam power. By the latter half of the nineteenth century, the diversity and wealth of industry earned the area the name 'The Golden Valley'.

In the 20th century, the population declined from 19,000 in the 1911 census to 15,000 in 1971. The 2001 census recorded a population of 16,849 living in the town.

=== Railway ===
Haslingden was once connected to Accrington and Bury Bolton Street by railway (Rush, 1983). The East Lancashire Railway built a station here, which remained open to passengers under British Railways until 7 November 1960 and to goods until 2 November 1964. The Bury–Accrington line itself remained in use until December 1966.

Much of the trackbed of the railway is no longer visible, with the A56 by-pass built over it between Grane Road and Blackburn Road; however, the line can still be traced through Helmshore towards Stubbins, where several magnificent viaducts still remain. The East Lancashire Railway Preservation Society was originally established at Helmshore station in the mid 1960s, with the aim of reopening the railway line to Stubbins. The project was abandoned with the organisation relocating to Bury in the 1970s and eventually reopening the Rawtenstall to Bury line.

== Industrial ==
=== Quarrying ===
Haslingden is notable for its stone quarrying and Haslingden Flag (a quartz-based sandstone) was distributed throughout the country in the 19th century with the opening up of the rail network. This stone was used in the paving of London, including Trafalgar Square. Flagstone is a type of sedimentary rock, relatively easy to split or quarry in slabs, and hence ideal for paving. Locally it is also used for making fences and roofing. Geologists have found that it has a hardness and silica content not unlike granite, and its presence was the main reason for the growth of quarrying in Rossendale. Haslingden Flag is unique; two other, common types of flagstone ('rough rocks') are found throughout the Pennines, but a third type is found only in the local Haslingden Flags.

=== Textiles ===
Like much of East Lancashire, Haslingden has a long association with the textile industry. From the 16th century, after the old Forest of Rossendale was opened up to settlement, farmers raised sheep on the moorlands and made woollen cloth. Initially this was small-scale and local but towards the end of the 18th century cloth workers came together to work in small groups of houses. At the same time advances in technology meant that the first mills were appearing in the area. Most of these were small, water-powered buildings; Haslingden, with its elevated situation, was not a natural place for the development of these early mills. Locally they were situated lower down in the river valleys, such as at nearby Helmshore.

The long association with wool meant that Haslingden and the other Rossendale towns had expertise with the processes of cloth production, and so were able to switch easily to cotton weaving. Cotton was better suited than wool to industrialised spinning as its fibres were less likely to break than wool. Cotton cloth manufacture quickly became a highly successful industry, and its development was closely associated with its role in the expansion of the slave trade. African slaves being bartered for cotton goods, and cotton being picked by slaves in the Deep South of the U.S.

The growth of mills also had an enormous impact on the landscape and on the lives of its workforce. Cotton weaving in the new factories was largely unregulated and the workforce kept almost at starvation levels. Hunger drove men and women to fight back, and mobs attacked the power-looms that were seen to be the cause of the decline in status of the workforce. In 1826, almost 3,000 people were reported as 'attacking machinery' in Haslingden. A troop of cavalry was stationed in the vicinity, and ring-leaders were arrested. It was reported from Haslingden in the same year that 'a great majority of the unemployed must literally perish from extreme want'. By the 1850 steam power began to supersede water power and mills grew in size. Grudgingly a minimum wage was introduced, and through the efforts of reformers, the churches and a few enlightened mill-owners, conditions for factory workers slowly improved. Conditions were still harsh, despite the whole Rossendale area being known as the 'Golden Valley'. No longer dependent on the rivers as a source of energy, the mill owners were freed to build elsewhere, and Haslingden began to find that successful mills, such as Hargreaves Street Mill, could be built on its higher land.

The long decline of the cotton industry began in the early years of the 20th century. During the First World War, India and Japan were able to develop their own industries and, after the Second World War, immigration – mainly from Pakistan – was encouraged to help bolster a failing industry. By the 1950s, mills were closing at an ever-faster rate. The old buildings were later often reoccupied by small businesses specialising in other occupations.

=== The Cockerill family ===
William Cockerill (1759-1832) and his son John Cockerill (1790-1840), along with other family members, both sons and daughters, are worth a footnote to the industrial history of Haslingden. Both were born in Haslingden and, as a young man, William showed great skill as an inventor of machinery. The Slubbing Billy, a roving or slubbing machine which twists and draws out yarn, is named after him. Slubbing Billy is also the name of a North West Morris Team. Father and son eventually left Haslingden and settled in Belgium, where they built the John Cockerill company, one of the largest industrial and machinery complexes in mainland Europe. It is said that they instituted the spread of the Industrial Revolution in continental Europe.

William's beginning are obscure, although it is likely that he worked as a blacksmith in Haslingden before travelling to St. Petersburg, Sweden, and finally to Verviers, near Liège, in Belgium. Here he set up spinning and carding machines with his sons Willam, Charles James, and John. John had also been born in Haslingden but moved to Vervier at the age of 12. He was eventually offered a Chateau in Seraing, which then became the heart of Belgium's iron, steel and machine-building industries. He is considered to be the founder of Belgian manufacturing and was known as a humanitarian employer.

=== Immigration and community ===
In the 19th century, when the cotton industry was thriving, the town became a magnet for immigrants to Britain. In particular, the port of Liverpool was a gateway for waves of immigrants and many of these were attracted by work in the mills. From the late 1840s, a large influx of Irish immigrants forced out of Ireland by the Great Famine of 1846–1852, came to Lancashire and some ended up in Haslingden. At almost the same time, as a result of the political instability in Italy, Italians came to Liverpool and Manchester and a few families moved on to Haslingden. Similarly, in the 1930s, various eastern European refugees fleeing Nazi persecution settled in the area. Immediately after World War II young women from Germany were brought over to work in the mills, and a few came to Haslingden and stayed.

From 1950 onwards, migrants were encouraged to travel from Commonwealth countries to work in the post-war textile industry. Initially this tended to mean young men who travelled from Pakistan, and later Bangladesh, fully expecting to return home after building up their savings. By the 1970s, many were joined by wives and families, settling permanently in Haslingden. As a result, the town is now home to a substantial and vibrant community of people with a South Asian heritage, mainly Bangladeshi and Pakistani. Many of the families come from just a few villages: from the Attock and Mirpur areas of north-west Pakistan, and from Patli Union in the Sylhet region of Bangladesh.

The town now houses two mosques and a considerable number of Asian grocers and other shops. In the 2011 census, almost 4% of the Rossendale population identify as Muslim, with the majority of these living in Haslingden.

== Governance ==
A civil parish was created in 1866 from the township of Haslingden in the ancient parish of Whalley. A local board was formed for the town in 1875 and the district it governed was extended to cover parts of the townships of Henheads, Higher and Lower Booths in the parish of Whalley, and Musbury and part of Tottington in the ancient parish of Bury. Subsequently, Haslingden was incorporated as a municipal borough in 1891 and, in 1894, the civil parish was extended to match the borders of the borough. Following the local government reorganisation; in 1974, Haslingden became part of the Borough of Rossendale.

In 2005, the Audit Commission rated Rossendale District Council performance as 'poor' and, in the Commission's Comprehensive Performance Assessment, it was listed as the worst performing district council in the country. By 2009, Rossendale Council was described as 'performing well' by the Audit Commission, with a rating of three out of four stars.

== Education ==
=== Schools ===
The Wesleyan School, formerly on the site of the current health centre, was the site of the first experiment in the world at a standardised intelligence test. It followed from a suggestion by the industrialist and Liberal politician Sir William Mather in 1900, given after a prize-giving to students to members of the Haslingden Technical Instruction Committee. The test was set by Henry Holman, a schools inspector and educationalist, in 1903. It included questions like 'is there a good reason for making a pie crust ornamental instead of plan?'. Mather introduced apprentice schemes at his factories which used testing as part of the selection method. He also introduced a 48-hour working week for employees.

Haslingden High School is a specialist arts, maths and computing college.

=== Library ===
Originally Haslingden Mechanics' Institute and opened in 1860, the building became the public library in 1905. A blue plaque commemorates Michael Davitt. The young Davitt migrated to Haslingden with his family in 1840 as a result of the family being evicted from their tenant farm by a British Landlord. He began working in a cotton mill but at the age of 11 his right arm was entangled in a cogwheel and mangled so badly it had to be amputated. When he recovered from his operation a local benefactor, John Dean, helped to give him an education. He also started night classes at the Mechanics' Institute and used its library.

Davitt's family home from 1867 to 1870 on Wilkinson Street is now marked by a memorial plaque. Amongst the library's collection is an early photograph (c. 1892) of Thomas Frederick Worrall labelled Tom Worrall, artist, whose watercolours included a depiction of the Old White Horse Inn (long demolished).

== Transport ==
Following the closure of Haslingden station, the nearest National Rail station is now 4 miles (6.4 km) miles away at Accrington, on the East Lancashire Line. Northern Trains operates regular services between Blackpool North, Preston, Burnley, Colne, Leeds and York.

Local bus services are operated by Blackburn Bus Company, Burnley Bus Company and Vision Bus; routes connect the town with Accrington, Blackburn, Burnley, Bury, Rawtenstall and Manchester.

== Landmarks ==
=== St James's Church and the 'Top of the Town' ===
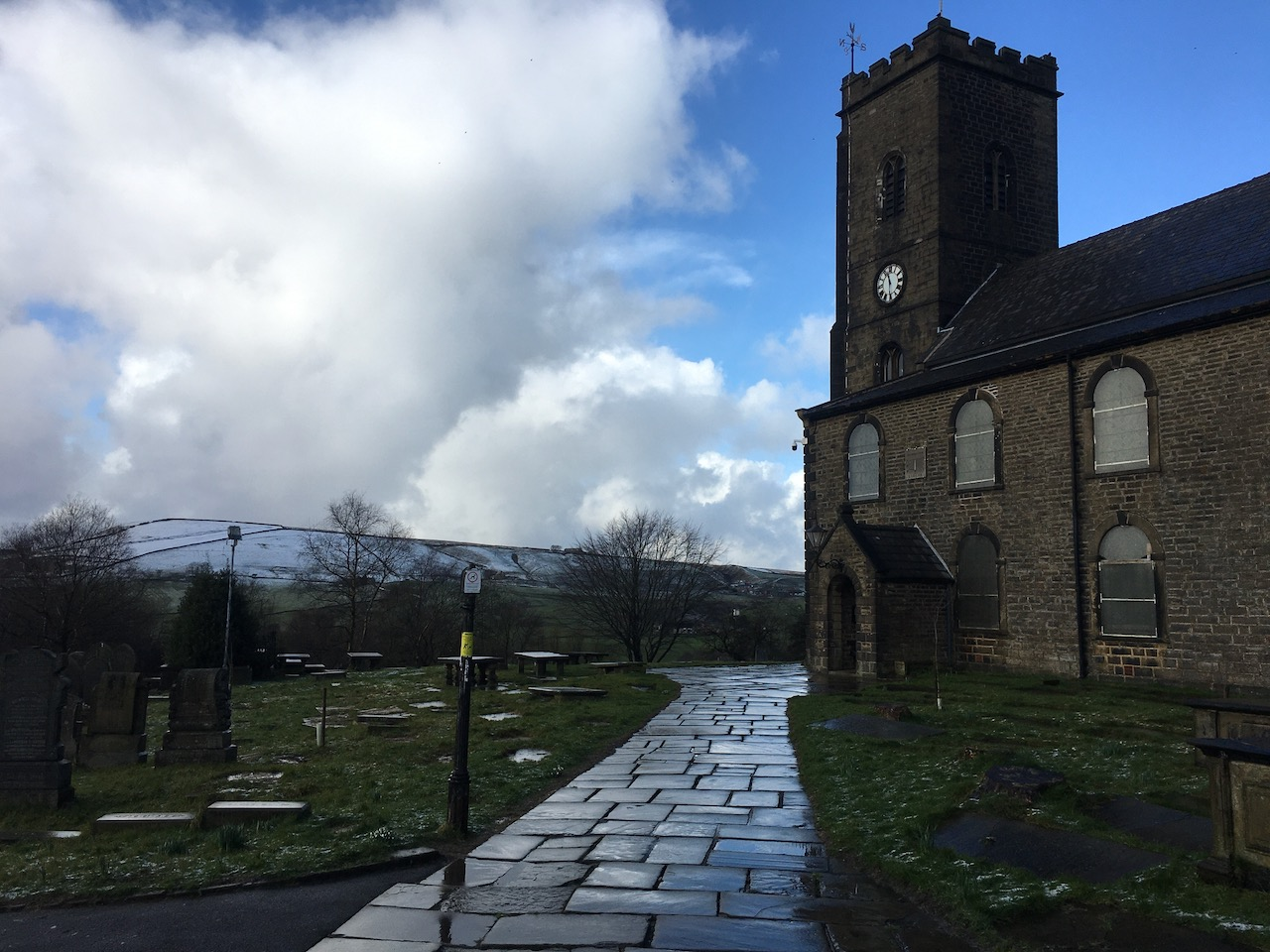
St James's Church

Haslingden's Anglican parish church, dedicated to St James the Great, was rebuilt in 1780 on a site occupied by a church building since at least 1284. The church is locally known as the 'Top Church' by reason of its dominating position. Murray's 1955 Guide says "it stands well and is plain Georgian, dully Gothicised inside". In 1296, a deed of gift of the Earl of Lincoln to the monks of Stanlaw granted them the parish of Whalley. Haslingden was recorded as being one of Whalley's seven independent chapelries and was served by two priests.

St James's Church is now located well to the north of the present town centre, but until the 1930s it stood adjacent to the area known as the 'Top of the Town' - the area between Town Gate and Church Street, and the old centre of Haslingden. This location embraced several public house drinking places, along with the original market, the town stocks, and Marsden Square, where travelling shows pitched their tents. Clearance began in 1932 and the area is now largely occupied by recently built housing.

By the west side of the parish church entrance is a large plague stone, with two carved holes. There is some uncertainty about its exact purpose, but most opinion is that such stones were used in times of plague to enable food (or other alms) to be offered to plague victims while avoiding direct contact. A Saxon Cross is mentioned in the Clitheroe court rolls of 1547, and the plague stone may have been placed at the base of the cross, which would date the stone to the 16th century at the latest.

=== Other churches ===
Beside the Memorial Gardens, the Manchester Road Methodist Church is a classic building with an Italian-inspired interior. Murray's Guide also mentions St Thomas, Helmshore (1851); St Stephen, Grane (1867); St John the Baptist, Stonefold (1885); St Peter, Laneside (1893) and the Roman Catholic Church of the Immaculate Conception (1859) and 'various other nonconformist churches', largely built in the early 19th century.

St Stephen's, Grane, has a particularly interesting history. Construction started in 1863 and finished four years later, designed by James Maxwell of Haslingden. The church was not consecrated until 1883. The construction of the Ogden Reservoir (which opened in 1912); however, led to almost total depopulation of the community of Grane. St Stephen's remained in use, with most of the villagers having moved to Haslingden. In 1925, they decided to move the church stone by stone to a new site, 2 miles (3.2 km) away at Three Lanes End, near Holden Cemetery. The church building is now a Holden Wood antiques centre and cafe.

=== The Public Hall ===
The Public Hall was opened in 1868 and built by a private company, formed by 'gentlemen representing the working classes and temperance movement'. It was bought by the town council in 1898 but, by the 1990s, it was largely unused except for occasional entertainments. The hall had been used for 50 or more years by Rossendale Amateur Operatic Society and other local community groups, but it was finally closed by Rossendale Council in 2005. The hall was sold by the council to a group representing the Asian heritage community and is now a mosque.

The hall was once a venue of Winston Churchill during his early political career. Emmeline Pankhurst once addressed the people of Haslingden from the stage and, after the Battle of the Somme in 1916, it was a temporary hospital for the survivors of the Accrington Pals who were sent home for treatment.

=== Other notable places ===
The town centre is home to the famous Big Lamp, originally erected in 1841 and is from where all distances in Haslingden are measured, although the original lamp has been replaced by a replica; the original was lost after being taken to America. Cissy Green's Bakery can be found on Deardengate; their handmade pies are still made to the original 1920s recipe. To the north of the town is the Holland's Pies factory and Winfield's, a large warehouse-style retail development promotes itself as a family day out. Solomon Commercials has a factory in the town. Haslingden's War Memorial is unusual in that it has no names recorded on it.

Chris Aspin writes of the haunting of Tor View, a house no longer standing that was situated behind the Rose & Crown pub on Manchester Road. Young Emma Walton died in the 1840s after a tragic love affair; this story was reported in 1956 by Joseph Braddock in his book Haunted Houses, where the author claimed to have had first-hand experiences of the ghost.

=== Beauty spots ===
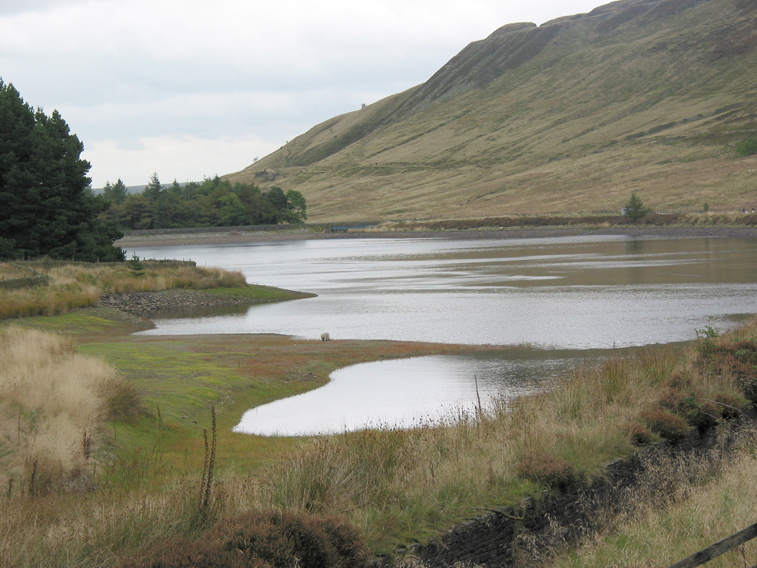
Calf Hey Reservoir in Grane Valley

There is an extensive area of moorland to the west of Haslingden. These moors are divided into Oswaldtwistle Moor and Haslingden Moor. The area forms part of the West Pennine Moors. Plans were made in 2007 to build a wind farm consisting of twelve wind turbines on the moors. This attracted both support and opposition, but the plan was approved by councillors in 2010. Further developments have yet to take place, and the plan remains controversial.

The Snighole (eel-hole) in Helmshore is a well-known beauty spot. The Grane Valley, which includes three reservoirs to the west of the town, is popular with walkers.

Victoria Park has a bowling green, children's playground, skateboard park and ball court. The top of the park affords views of Musbury Hill.

=== The Halo ===
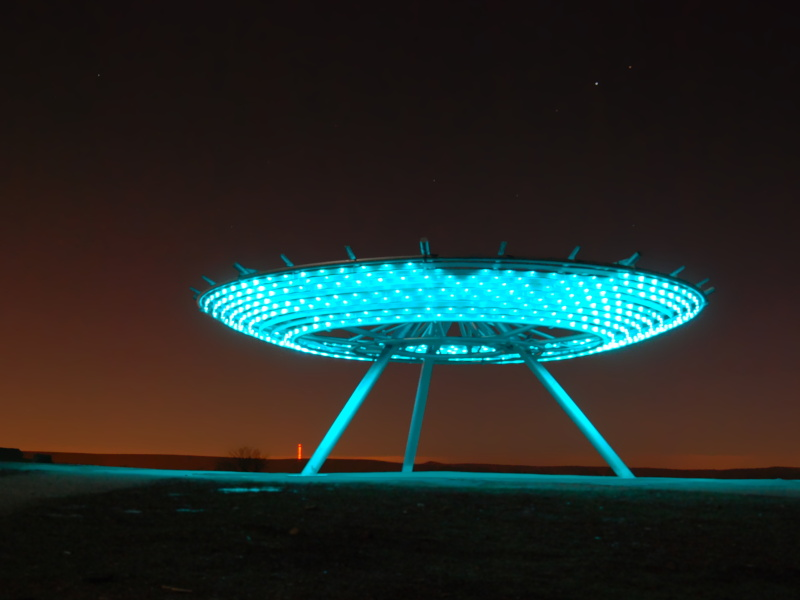
Haslingden Halo

The Panopticons competition was launched in May 2003 by RIBA Competitions organised by Mid-Pennine Arts. The Halo artwork, designed by John Kennedy, was selected and opened in 2007 and is sited in the hills above Haslingden as the centrepiece of a reclaimed landscape. It glows at night with an impressive viewpoint.

== Notable residents ==
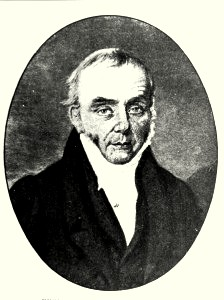
William Cockerill, pre-1830

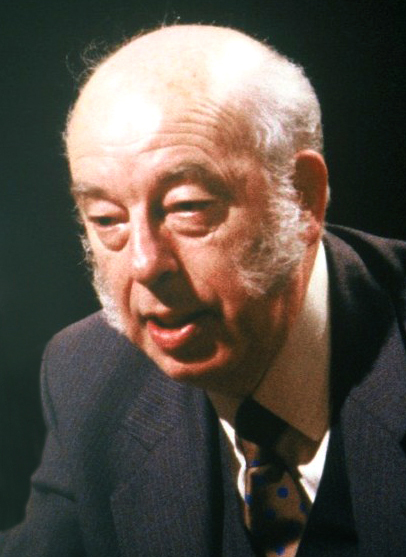
Rhodes Boyson, 1989

- William Cockerill (1759–1832) inventor, entrepreneur and industrialist
- John Cockerill (1790–1840) industrialist and businessman in Belgium
- Sir James Duckworth (1840–1915) businessman, founded a large chain a grocery shops; he was mayor of Rochdale three times and a Liberal MP twice
- Michael Davitt (1846–1906), Irish Republican and Westminster MP. In 2006, a revamped memorial to Davitt was unveiled by the Irish president Mary McAleese in Wilkinson Street
- Robert Scott (1874–1961), recipient of the Victoria Cross during the Second Boer War
- Whit Cunliffe (1875–1966), comic singer, "the epitome of what made Music Hall"
- Beryl Ingham (1901–1960), clog dancer and wife and manager of George Formby
- Alan Rawsthorne (1905–1971), British composer.
- Eugenie Cheesmond (1919–2007), psychiatrist, founded Lifeline project, a charity for drug addiction
- Ethel Bidwell (1919–2003), research scientist, investigated blood coagulation, enabled surgery for haemophilia.
- Sir Rhodes Boyson (1925–2012), head teacher of Lea Bank County Secondary Modern School in Cloughfold, councillor on Haslingden Borough Council, Conservative MP for Brent North, and government minister
- Chris Aspin (1933–2024), journalist, historian and author on the local textile industry; Helmshore resident
- Dave Pearson (1937–2008), painter and educator, studio in Haslingden
- Andie Brown (born 1955), an Anglican priest, the Archdeacon of Man from 2011 to July 2021
- Sophie Lancaster (1986-2007), murder victim
- Antony Higginbotham (born 1989), politician, MP for Burnley from 2019 to 2024.

=== Sport ===
- Choppy Warburton (1845–1897) born in Coal Hey, just off Lower Deardengate, was a record-breaking runner and a cycling coach Painted by Toulouse-Lautrec
- George Yates (1856–1925), cricketer who played 92 first-class cricket matches
- William Foster (1890–1963), swimmer, team gold medallist at the 1908 Summer Olympics
- Armour Ashe (1925–1968), footballer with 254 club caps, played 162 games for Accrington Stanley
- Clive Lloyd (born 1944), West Indies and Lancashire C.C.C. cricketer, also played for Haslingden
- Ian Austin (born 1966), cricketer, played 124 first-class cricket matches.

== See also ==
- Listed buildings in Haslingden
