= Witness seminar =

A witness seminar is a method of collecting oral history material, whereby a number of people connected to an event or topic meet to share recollections of their involvement. The results may be recorded or videotaped and an edited transcript published.

The concept was conceived and formalised by the Institute of Contemporary British History (now the Centre for Contemporary British History) and was subsequently adopted by The History of Modern Biomedicine Group, and published as volumes in the Wellcome Witnesses to Contemporary Medicine series.
