= Helmshore Mills Textile Museum =

Wool and cotton mills in Lancashire, England

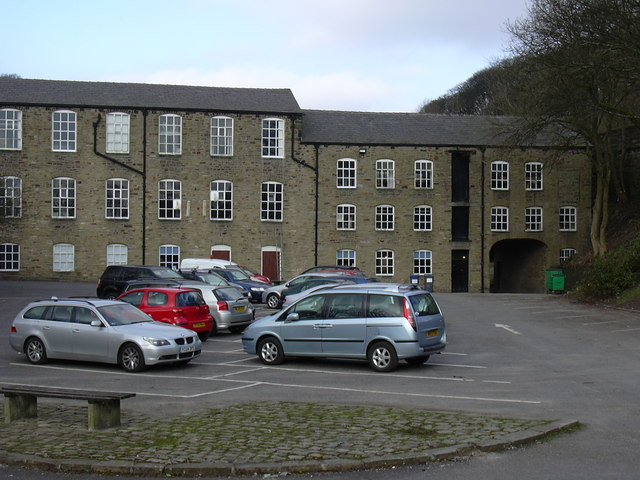
- Helmshore Mills Textile Museum

- Location within the Borough of Rossendale
- Alternative names: Higher Mill, Whitakerś Mill
- Architectural style: Stone built 3 storey
- Structural system: Stone
- Location: Helmshore, Rossendale, Lancashire, England
- Owner: William Turner
- Further ownership: Higher Mill Trust (1967)
- Current owners: Lancashire Museums
- Coordinates: 53.6890°N 2.3362°W

Construction
- Built: 1789
- Floor count: 3

Water Power
- Wheels: 2 Pitch back

Equipment
- Cotton count: 20
- Mule Frames: 4 per floor, Taylor Lang, Stalybridge
- Doublers: 1

Helmshore Mills are two mills built on the River Ogden in Helmshore, Lancashire. Higher Mill was built in 1789 for William Turner, and Whitaker's Mill was built in the 1820s by the Turner family. In their early life they alternated between working wool and cotton. By 1920 they were working shoddy as condensor mule mills; and equipment has been preserved and is still used. The mills closed in 1967 and they were taken over by the Higher Mills Trust, whose trustees included historian and author Chris Aspin and politician Dr Rhodes Boyson, who maintained it as a museum. The mills are said to the most original and best-preserved examples of both cotton spinning and woollen fulling left in the country that are still operational.

Following the withdrawal of its grant from Lancashire County Council, the museum closed to the public on 30 September 2016 for an indefinite period. However, the museum remained open for pre-booked school visits. In April 2018 the council announced that the museums would reopen to the general public for three days a week between April and November.

== Location ==
Helmshore Mills lie within Helmshore, a village in the Rossendale Valley, Lancashire. The village is 2 miles (3.2 km) south of Haslingden, broadly between the A56 and the B6235, approximately 16 miles (26 km) north of Manchester, and 3 miles (4.8 km) from the M65 motorway. Helmshore straddles the River Ogden, a tributary of the River Irwell. The village developed around the seven cotton and wool mills.

== History ==
The Turner family had already been involved in textiles before the mills were built. Three of the six family members made their living from wool in Martholme, and three brothers from cotton in Blackburn. In February 1789, they paid £725 for land for a mill. The family built Higher Mill on a greenfield site in the parish of Musbury as a woollen fulling mill, but by 1789, three members of the family had dropped out of the enterprise. It was the son of one of these original six, a William Turner (1793–1852), who built the larger wool carding and spinning mill in the 1820s. The wool went to Middle Mill on Holcombe Road for weaving, then returned to Higher Mill for fulling and finishing. Turner instructed in his will that the mill should be sold on his death, which occurred in 1852. This mill was destroyed by fire in 1857, and was rebuilt in 1860 by Edward Turner.

At some point after the end of the American Civil War and the return of cotton imports to Lancashire, the rebuilt mill started spinning cotton. When the mill was rebuilt, it was equipped almost but not completely by Messrs Walker & Hacking of Bury with machinery for processing raw cotton through to fine cotton spinning and (unlike in later years) weaving with power looms built by Dickenson of Blackburn. Due to later reconfigurations of the site, it is almost impossible now to see any evidence of this layout.

In the 1920s, the mill was bought by L.Whitaker & Sons who installed cotton condensing equipment and the mill continued in that business until November 1978. Higher Mill came to be operated by Lawrence Whittaker in 1875 still using Turner's machinery, and his descendants continued to run it as a fulling mill until June 1967. The two families may have been distantly related, but by the 1920s the Whittakers were a well-known local family while the L. Whitaker & Sons group no longer had any Whitakers working for them and were owned and run by the Hardman family. The freehold of both mills in the Helmshore Mills Estate was bought by Lawrence Whittaker's family.

=== The Museum ===
When Rossall Whittaker died in 1971 leaving no male heirs, Higher Mill was saved by local enthusiasts who recognised its significance and had it scheduled as an Ancient monument, and bought it through a trust. Platt International, whose site was also in Helmshore, owned a significant collection of historic textile machines and agreed that they should be located in Higher Mill. The task of running a museum and maintaining the buildings put pressure on the trust, so in 1975 Lancashire County Council stepped in, taking a 99-year lease. Whitaker's Mill became vacant in 1978 and Lancashire County Council, seeing the advantages of having control of the two mills, bought the condensor mill. This allowed them to also purchase the Platt collection in 1985, keeping the site intact and forming a comprehensive museum of the Lancashire textile industry. The expertise, knowledge and experience of the site staff and Lancashire Museums Service is used by other sites including NT Quarry Bank Mill at Styal and the Science and Industry Museum in Manchester.

==== Exhibits ====
The museum divides its collections into three themed areas, representing the wool story, the cotton story and the spinning floor.

The wool story shows the water wheel and fulling stocks and clay pots used to collect urine from the local cottages, which produced the ammonia needed for fulling. It goes on to show the later box system. There is a tenter frame, with the tenterhooks to show how the cloth was dried without shrinking and how teasels were used to lift up the nap. This was of course later mechanised and there is a teasel-holding frame known as the teasel raising gig.

The cotton story illustrates firstly the hand weavers' cottage, with a frame loom with a hand-thrown shuttle; mannakins represent the weaver and two women spinning the yarn on different types of wheel. A child is shown hand-carding. It is here we see a 16-spindle spinning jenny that would have dated from about 1760, and a 50-spindle improved jenny. There is an original Arkwrights first carding machine. There is a complete sequence of machines that would have taken the bolls from the bales: opener, scutcher, breaker card, finisher card, draw frame and finally a complete Arkwright water frame dating from 1790. Sharing the floor at Whitaker's Mill is the equipment needed to prepare the waste cotton for the cards in the room above. There is a single cylinder picker for soft waste and a six cylinder devil for the hard waste.

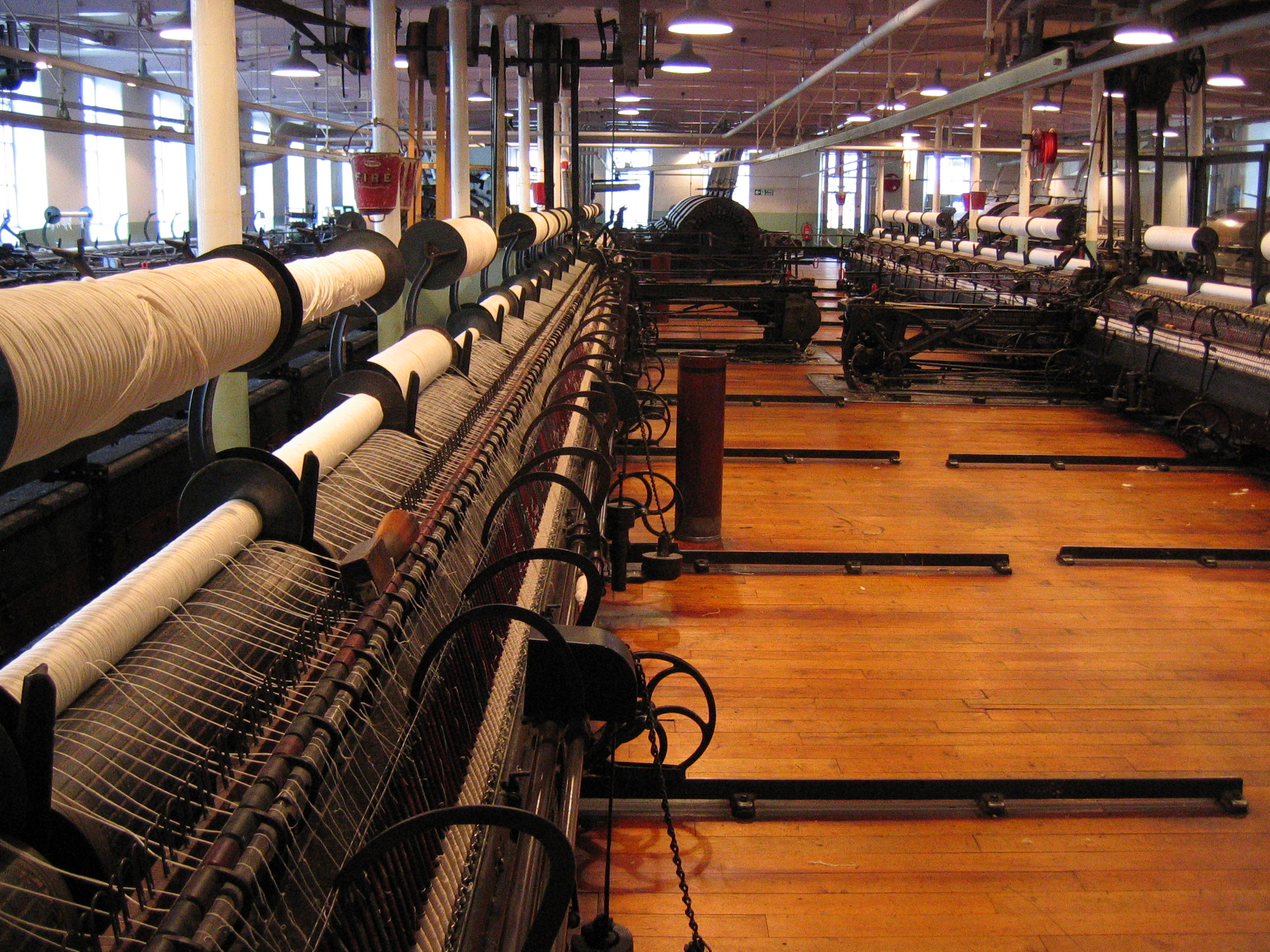
Spinning floor

The spinning floor was one of two at this mill, and has all the equipment to breaker card the shoddy (recycled cotton) and to finisher card the slivers into rovings. These go onto the 714-spindle Taylor Lang spinning mules. Opening, scutching and mixing happened on the floor below. This is the only original and complete floor of its type left.

Spun yarn is sent to sister museum Queen Street Mill on the outskirts of Burnley to be woven.

==== Closure ====
In November 2015 Lancashire County Council announced that it would withdraw funding from five of its museums: Fleetwood Museum, Helmshore Mills Textile Museum, Judges' Lodgings, Museum of Lancashire and Queen Street Mill because of what the leader of the council described as "the financial challenges facing the county council as we deal with relentless cuts to central government funding combined with rising demand for our services." They were initially to close at the end of March 2016 but that month were reprieved until 30 September 2016.

The museum closed on 30 September 2016, along with the other four Lancashire museums mentioned above, except for pre-booked school groups. As of 3 June 2017 Lancashire County Council's website stated that "Negotiations are underway to identify a new operator."

Re-Opening

In April 2018 it was announced the museum would reopen on Fridays, Saturdays and Sundays 12:00 - 16:00 during the summer season from the end of March until early November each year. From November 2022 the Museum has opened its Community Café every Thursday as a warm space throughout the winter season from 11:00 to 16:00.

== The mills ==
The whole site is a Scheduled Ancient Monument; Higher Mill is also a Grade II listed building. The associated chimney stack on the other side of Holcombe Road is also separately Grade II listed.

== Condenser spinning ==
The condenser spinning process (1920)
Hard Waste
Jumbo
Six cylinder devil
Breaker Scutcher
Breaker Carding
Derby Doubler
Finisher Carding
Drawing
Mule Spinning
Yarn

Soft Waste
Single cylinder devil
Lap (Scutcher lap)
Sliver
Lap (Sliver lap)
Roving

Comber waste	-
Hopper opener	Blowing Room
42lbs a time
Carding Room
Takes 88 slivers
On bobbins or a beam

Fine spinning produced a lot of waste, so naturally this was recycled. This waste was the raw material of a condensor spinning mill. It came in three forms: loose staple, unspun rovings and spun thread (hard waste) that had been pirned but rejected. No matter its source, it had to be devilled (broken down) to staple, then scutched and carded in the normal way. After these processes the staple was very short, and the processing of the lap was different – a Derby Doubler was used to mix slivers into sliver lap. A notable feature of the mule was that the rovings were on a beam rather than on individual bobbins. As the fine spinning of cotton contracted, so did the need for condensing.

== Boilers and chimney ==
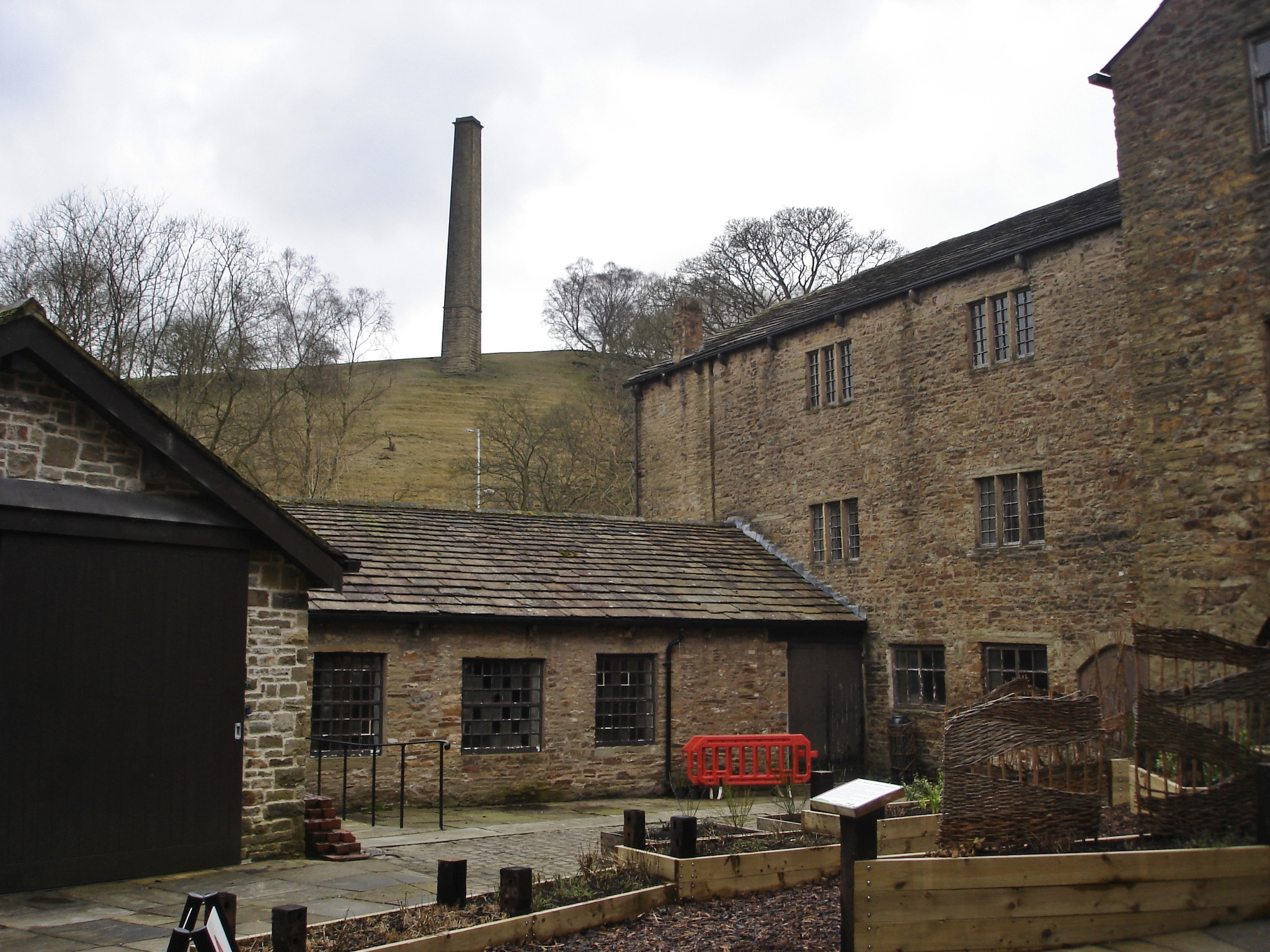
Higher Mill and remote Whitaker Mill chimney

When the steam engine was installed in Whitaker Mill, Lancashire boilers were ubiquitous. For maximum efficiency they required air to be drawn over the coals, and this was the function of the mill chimney. As these mills are set in a valley the airflow was irregular, so the chimney was built on the hill opposite and the flue passed over the river and underground to reach the chimney, providing the required updraught. The first boilers in Whitaker Mill were built by B. Hick and Son of Bolton and were installed around 1855; at the 1868 auction the mill was equipped for fine cotton spinning with a number of power looms also on site. The later Lancashire boilers in Whitaker Mill, built by Yates and Thom of Blackburn, were taken out in the 1950s. The boiler for heating Higher Mill was of the Cornish type installed where the hub is now.

== Water ==
Clean water was needed for processing the cloth. This was captured from field drainage on the hillside opposite and stored in a lodge on the farther side of the river, piped across when required. The water wheel, and later the engine condenser, could use the then highly polluted water from the River Ogden: a weir was placed 800m upstream and the water diverted into a long canal-like lodge that finished at the mill. Having passed over the pitch-back wheel, the water passed through a culverted tail goit back into the Ogden.

== See also ==
- List of mills in Lancashire
- Listed buildings in Haslingden
- Cotton mill
