= Listed buildings in Haslingden =

Haslingden is a town in Rossendale, Lancashire, England, and close to it are the communities of Helmshore, Ewood Bridge, and Irwell Vale. The area contains 48 buildings that are recorded in the National Heritage List for England as designated listed buildings. Of these, three are listed at Grade II*, the middle grade, and the others are at Grade II, the lowest grade. Until the coming of the Industrial Revolution the area was agricultural, and almost all the earliest listed buildings are farmhouses and farm buildings. With the arrival of industry, first came weavers' cottages and then mills, some of which are listed. As the population grew, buildings to serve the community were constructed. Listed examples of these include churches and associated structures, and a public house. The East Lancashire Railway passes through the area, and viaducts built to carry it are listed. In addition the gateway to a public park and two war memorials are listed.

== Key ==
Grade	Criteria
II*	Particularly important buildings of more than special interest
II	Buildings of national importance and special interest

== Buildings ==
Name and location	Photograph	Date	Notes	Grade
Ewood Hall; 53.68373°N 2.31208°W		1641	Originally a farmhouse, it is in sandstone with a stone-slate roof, and has three storeys. It has a shallow U-shaped plan with a main three-bay range and two shallow cross wings. There is a full-height porch that has a Tudor arched doorway, a hood mould that continues over the window to the right, and a datestone. The windows are mullioned or mullioned and transomed.	II*
Tor End Farmhouse; 53.68424°N 2.33951°W	—	Mid 17th century	The farmhouse is in ruins. It is in sandstone with two storeys and originally had two bays with an extension added in the 18th century. The windows are mullioned.	II
Lower Cockham Farmhouse and barn 53.68175°N 2.31859°W	—	1717	The farmhouse and attached barn are in sandstone with stone-slate roofs. The house has two storeys and two-bays, and a single-storey outshut. Most of the windows are mullioned, or mullioned and transomed. One of the windows, converted from a doorway, has an inscribed lintel. On the east side is a barn that has a front outshut, opposing segmental-headed wagon entrances, and three doorways.	II
Carter Place Farmhouse; 53.71968°N 2.32777°W	—	Early 18th century	A sandstone farmhouse with a slate roof in two storeys. It has three bays, with an outshut and a dairy extension at the rear. On the front is a two-storey porch, the upper storey being jettied. The doorway has a plain surround, there is one blocked mullioned window, and the other windows are sashes.	II
Carter Place Cottages; 53.71938°N 2.32787°W	—	1744	A house and cottage in sandstone with stone-slate roofs, in two storeys. The house has quoins, and ball finials on the left gable. It has a symmetrical front of three bays that contains a doorway with pilaster jambs and a moulded cornice, above which is a decorated datestone. The original windows have been replaced with casements. The cottage to the right has a doorway with a plain surround and windows, some of which are mullioned, and others have been altered.	II
14 Stone Fold; 53.72977°N 2.32387°W		18th century	A sandstone house with a stone-slate roof, in two storeys with an attic and in two bays with an outshut. The windows on the front have two lights and mullions, and in the gable end is a similar attic window. The doorway has a plain surround, and there is also a similar first floor doorway.	II
Clod Farmhouse; 53.70502°N 2.35184°W	—	18th century	A farmhouse, later converted into a house called Cloud Hill, in sandstone with a stone-slate roof. There are two storeys and three bays. The original windows have been replaced with casements.	II
Kiln Field Farmhouse; 53.69009°N 2.34549°W	—	18th century	The farmhouse is in sandstone with a roof of stone-slate with some slate. It is in two storeys, with an L-shaped plan consisting of two ranges at right angles. There is a two-storey gabled porch that has a rectangular lintel and contains a stone bench. The windows are in various types, including sashes, a mullioned window, and casements.	II
Barn, Kiln Field Farm; 53.68985°N 2.34576°W	—	18th century	A sandstone barn with a stone-slate roof and in a rectangular plan. It has two storeys and three bays, and contains a wagon entrance with a segmental head, doors, and windows. In the left gable wall is a bull's eye window, and a small owl hole and perching stone.	II
Hen Heads Farmhouse; 53.73745°N 2.32036°W		18th century	The farmhouse and adjoining barn are in sandstone with a stone-slate roof. The house has two storeys, quoins, and a symmetrical two-bay front. In the centre of the front is a single-storey lean-to porch. Some of the windows are mullioned, and others have been replaced. The barn to the left contains a segmental-headed wagon entrance, a loading door, and an outshut.	II
The Lindens; 53.70654°N 2.32540°W		18th century	A sandstone house with a slate roof containing skylights. It has two storeys and three bays, with three three-light stepped windows in the ground floor and seven vertical rectangular windows above. The doorway has a pedimented architrave. On the right return is a flight of steps leading to the first floor, and at the rear are mullioned windows. Inside the house are vaulted cellars.	II
Duckworth Monument; 53.70825°N 2.32570°W	—	1754	The monument is in the churchyard of St James' Church. It is a stone tomb chest with panelled sides. On the lid are incised letters and decorations, including winged faces and verses.	II
Mansion House Farmhouse; 53.72952°N 2.32378°W		1755	A sandstone house with quoins and a tiled roof in two storeys. It has a symmetrical two-bay front and an outshut at the rear. The central two-storey porch has a doorway with plain jambs and a large rectangular inscribed lintel. Above it is a casement window and a datestone containing initials, the date, and a shield with a child's head. Most of the other windows are mullioned.	II
16 and 18 Stone Fold, garden wall and barn 53.72991°N 2.32401°W		1767	Originally a farmhouse, later converted into two dwellings, it is in sandstone with a stone-slate roof. There are three storeys and three bays. The main doorway has a moulded surround and a pediment, and above it is a datestone. There is another doorway to the right with a plain surround. The windows are casements with mullions. To the right is a three-bay barn with a slate roof, containing a segmental-headed wagon entry, a window, and slit ventilators. The garden wall has rounded coping and it contains a central gateway.	II
Three linked monuments 53.70817°N 2.32572°W	—	1770	The monuments are in the churchyard of St James' Church, and commemorate members of the Lonsdale family who died respectively in 1770, 1776, and 1816. They are stone tomb chests, with panelled sides and inscribed and decorated lids.	II
Fold House; 53.68968°N 2.33015°W	—	1772	Originally a farmhouse, later extended on both sides, and converted into a house and a cottage. It is in sandstone with a stone-slate roof, and has two storeys. The original part has two bays, with a bay added on each side. In the centre is a doorway with a pedimented surround, a datestone above, and a modern bay window to the right. Most of the windows are mullioned. The right bay contains a doorway with a slab canopy and a stepped three-light window.	II
6 and 8 Church Street; 53.70705°N 2.32536°W		Late 18th century	A sandstone house, later converted into two shops, with a slate roof. There are three storeys and three bays. In the ground floor are shop fronts, and above some of the windows are sashes, and others have been altered. At the rear is a two-storey extension.	II
4–14 Coal Hey; 53.70424°N 2.32689°W		Late 18th century	Six back-to-back houses in sandstone with a slate roof in three storeys and three bays. The doorways have plain surrounds, and some have slab canopies on shaped brackets. Some of the windows have retained their mullions and others have been altered.	II
Carter Place Hall; 53.71953°N 2.32765°W		Late 18th century	The house, extended in the 19th century, is in sandstone with a hipped slate roof, and is in three storeys. There are five bays, with three bays added later to the left. The front is symmetrical, the central three bays projecting forward and pedimented. There is a porch that has a doorway with an egg-and-dart surround, paired fluted Corinthian pilasters, an entablature, a cornice, and a balustrade. Most of the windows are sashes with architraves. On the right return is a 19th-century two-storey bay window.	II*
Causeway Head Farmhouse; 53.69395°N 2.32973°W	—	Late 18th century	Originally a house and a cottage, later combined into one dwelling, it is in sandstone with a stone-slate roof. There are two storeys and three bays. The doorway has a plain surround, and the windows are mullioned.	II
Barn, Gregory Fold; 53.68974°N 2.32982°W	—	Late 18th century (probable)	The barn is in sandstone with a stone-slate roof, and has two bays. In the gable end facing the road are a round-headed wagon entrance, ventilation slits, a blocked oculus, and an owl hole. On the left side are a single-storey lean-to and a two-storey extension, and on the right side are a window and a stable door. (Note: Street View in June 2011 shows that the barn has been converted for domestic use.)	II
Hey Meadow Farmhouse; 53.67436°N 2.29926°W	—	Late 18th century	The farmhouse was later extended by one bay to the right. It is in sandstone with a stone-slate roof and is in two storeys. The original part has two bays with a central single-storey gabled porch that contains a doorway with a plain surround. To the left of the porch the windows are mullioned, and to the right they are sashes.	II
Snig Hole Cottages; 53.68293°N 2.32890°W		Late 18th century	Originally a row of back-to-back cottages, later converted into five dwellings. They are in sandstone with a slate roof, in two storeys, and each cottage has one bay. The doorways have slab canopies, and most of the windows have three lights and are stepped.	II
St James' Church; 53.70836°N 2.32586°W		1780	The church was enlarged and the tower substantially rebuilt in 1827, and the roof was replaced in 1857. It is in sandstone with rusticated quoins, and a slate roof. The church consists of a nave, a chancel, full length aisles, north and south porches, and a west tower. The tower has three stages, small buttresses, a round-headed west doorway, three clock faces, and an embattled parapet. Along the sides are two tiers of round-headed windows. Inside the church are galleries on three sides.	II
Higher Mill Museum; 53.68984°N 2.33731°W		1789	Originally a woollen fulling mill, it is in sandstone with a stone-slate roof in three storeys. The former mill has an L-shaped plan, the shorter arm containing offices. The windows are mullioned, most with three lights, and there is a porch with an arched doorway and a wagon doorway, also arched. At the east end is a working backshot water wheel. The mill is now part of the Helmshore Mills Textile Museum.	II
241–247 Holcombe Road; 53.69058°N 2.33864°W	—	Early 19th century (probable)	Two pairs of adjoining cottages in sandstone with stone-slate roofs. Each cottage has one bay, a doorway with a plain surround, and sash windows. Nos. 241 and 243 have three storeys, and Nos. 245 and 247 have two. The cottages are built on a steep slope, and at the rear are doorways in the top floors.	II
Elton Banks; 53.67683°N 2.30508°W		Early 19th century	A sandstone house with a slate roof in two storeys and four bays. The doorway has a round head and a Tuscan doorcase with an open pediment. The windows are sashes.	II
Museum of the Lancashire Textile Industry; 53.68944°N 2.33752°W		Early 19th century	This originated as a cotton spinning mill and warehouse that were damaged by fire and rebuilt in 1859–60, later becoming part of the Helmshore Mills Textile Museum. It is in three storeys, and consists of a rectangular spinning block in 14 bays with a three-span roof, and a warehouse block of seven bays. All the windows have segmental heads, and there are also loading bays and a wagon tunnel.	II
250–264 Holcombe Road; 53.69177°N 2.33833°W		1829	A row of millworkers' cottages in pebbledashed sandstone with a stone-slate roof. They have two storeys at the front and three at the rear. The doorways have plain surrounds, and the windows are casements imitating sashes. In the first floor of No. 262 is a datestone.	II
1–21 Bowker Street and 1-5 Aitken Street; 53.67835°N 2.31733°W		1833	Rows of eleven millworkers' cottages on Bowker Street and four on Aitken Street. They are in sandstone with slate roofs in two storeys, and each house has a doorway with a plain surround. The windows in Bowker Street are sashes, and those in Aitken street are top-hung casement windows resembling sashes. No. 1 Bowker Street is a shop with a larger ground floor window, top-hung casements, and a datestone.	II
2–24 Bowker Street and 7-11 Aitken Street; 53.67822°N 2.31719°W		c. 1833	Rows of twelve millworkers' cottages on Bowker Street and three on Aitken Street. They are in sandstone with slate roofs in two storeys, and each house has a doorway with a plain surround. Most of the cottages have one top-hung casement window imitating a sash window.	II
Syke House; 53.69586°N 2.31490°W		c. 1840	A stone house with a slate roof in Neoclassical style, later used as a public house. It has two storeys and a symmetrical three-bay front with angle pilasters. There is a central doorway that has a doorcase with unfluted Ionic columns and a cornice. The windows are sashess.	II
Woolpack Inn; 53.69346°N 2.31255°W		1841	A public house in sandstone with a stone-slate roof. It has two storeys, five bays, corner pilasters, and a plain frieze. The middle three bays project forward, and are pedimented. The doorway has a moulded cornice on moulded consoles. In the pediment is a square blank panel, above which is an inscription.	II
Ravenshore Viaduct; 53.68146°N 2.32328°W		1848	The viaduct formerly carried the Accrington Branch of the East Lancashire Railway over the River Ogden. It is in stone, and consists of three skew arches. The piers have impost bands, and parts of the parapet have been lost.	II
Viaducts and revetment 53.69149°N 2.33775°W		1848	The two viaducts and connecting embankment with its revetment were built for the East Lancashire Railway. The viaduct crosses the River Ogden and passes to the east of Higher Mill. The structure is in stone and consists of two viaducts, each with seven segmental arches carried on tapering piers, with a battlemented parapet that continues along the revetment.	II
St Thomas' Church; 53.68720°N 2.33022°W		1850–51	The church, a commissioners' church designed by E. H. Shellard in Decorated style, is in sandstone with a slate roof. It consists of a nave, a matching north aisle, a chancel, and a west steeple. The steeple has a three-stage tower with angle buttresses and an arched west doorway, and a broach spire with clock faces and lucarnes.	II
Britannia Mill; 53.7124°N 2.3268°W		1855–56	A weaving mill that was expanded in 1895 and 1916. It is built mainly in sandstone, with some brick, and has Welsh slate roofs. It consists of a three-storey preparation block with a chimney, a boiler house and an engine house, a weaving shed, and a later three-storey extension block.	II
Methodist Church; 53.70324°N 2.32400°W		1857	The church was extended in 1883 with the addition of a chancel. It is in sandstone with a slate roof, and consists of a nave, a chancel, and transepts. The east gable end faces the road and has an openwork parapet. It contains a pair of turrets, square at the base and octagonal above, that have embattled bell stages and crocketed pinnacles. Between the turrets are a doorway and a five-light Perpendicular window. Inside the church is a gallery on three sides, and an altar and reredos, both in alabaster.	II
29 Manchester Road; 53.70338°N 2.32455°W	—	c. 1858	Originally the caretaker's house for the Methodist Church, later a private house, it is in sandstone with quoins and a slate roof. It has two storeys, three bays, and a projecting two-storey porch, and is in Tudor style. The doorway has a chamfered surround and a three-light mullioned fanlight. Most of the windows have arched heads.	II
Chimney, Higher Mill; 53.69014°N 2.33889°W		c. 1860	The chimney to Higher Mill stands on a hillside overlooking the mill and connects to it by an underground flue. It is in sandstone and has a square plan.	II
St Stephen's Church; 53.69904°N 2.34382°W		1868	The church was designed by Maxwell and Tuke in Gothic style, and was originally on a different site, being moved to its present site in 1927, and has subsequently been converted for other uses. It is in sandstone with a slate roof, and consists of a nave, a polygonal chancel with a vestry and organ house, and a northwest steeple. The steeple has a three-stage tower incorporating a porch, an arched north doorway, and a broach spire with lucarnes. Inside the church are hammerbeam roofs.	II
31 Manchester Road; 53.70348°N 2.32420°W	—	1873	A Methodist manse in sandstone with slate roofs, in Gothic style, with three bays and two storeys with an attic. There is a single-storey gabled porch with a doorway that is flanked by shafts with foliated caps. Most of the windows are sashes, there is a canted bay window, and gabled dormers.	II
Church of St John the Evangelist; 53.72485°N 2.32929°W		1885–86	The church was designed by Basil Champneys in Decorated style, and has since been converted for domestic use. It is in sandstone with a slate roof, and consists of a nave, a south aisle, a south west porch, and a chancel with a southeast organ house and vestry. On the west gable is a bellcote with a weathervane. In the north wall of the chancel is a niche containing a statue of John the Evangelist.	II
St Peter's Church; 53.70085°N 2.32154°W		1890	The church, designed by Basil Champneys in Decorated style, was never completed. It is built in sandstone with slate roofs, and consists of a nave and chancel in one cell, a lean-to south aisle, a gabled north porch, and an octagonal embattled east turret.	II
Gateway, Victoria Park; 53.69847°N 2.32597°W		1901	The gateway consists of two pairs of stone gate piers and wrought iron gates. The gate piers have a square plan, panelled sides, and pyramidal caps, the central pair being about 3 metres (9.8 ft) high and slightly taller than the outer pair. The gates are elaborate with scrolls, a spear finial, a coat of arms, and a cartouche.	II
Grane Mill; 53.70179°N 2.31958°W		1906	A cotton weaving mill that was extended in 1913, with later alterations. It is built in sandstone, partly rendered, with blue slate roofs. The building consists of a single-storey warehouse, an office block with a two-storey extension, a boiler house containing two Lancashire boilers, an economiser house with a chimney, and an engine house with a cross compound engine. The chimney is round, slightly tapering, in brick, about 45 metres (148 ft) high, with a collar and crown in terracotta.	II*
War Memorial, Helmshore; 53.68366°N 2.33163°W		1922	The memorial stands in the Memorial Gardens, and consists of a clock tower in sandstone. The tower tapers slightly and is about 11 metres (36 ft) tall, and on each side is a lattice window and a cornice. Above the cornice is a square clock face on each side, above which is another cornice and a pyramidal roof. In the lower part of the tower is a string course and a panel with an inscription and the names of those lost in the two World Wars. At the base of the tower are three steps on which is a plinth and a doorway.	II
War Memorial, Haslingden; 53.70290°N 2.32349°W		1924	The war memorial was designed by L. F. Roslyn. It consists of a granite panelled pedestal about 2.5 metres (8 ft 2 in) high on two steps. Standing on the pedestal is a bronze statue of a soldier with a rifle protecting a wounded comrade. There are inscriptions on the base of the pedestal.	II

== Notes and references ==
=== Sources ===
- Hartwell, Clare; Pevsner, Nikolaus (2009) [1969], Lancashire: North, The Buildings of England, New Haven and London: Yale University Press, ISBN 978-0-300-12667-9
- Historic England, "Ewood Hall, Haslingden (1072806)", National Heritage List for England
- Historic England, "Tor End Farm, Haslingden (1254272)", National Heritage List for England
- Historic England, "Lower Cockham Farmhouse and attached barn, Haslingden (1072815)", National Heritage List for England
- Historic England, "Carter Place Farmhouse, Haslingden (1072845)", National Heritage List for England
- Historic England, "Carter Place Cottages, Haslingden (1163492)", National Heritage List for England
- Historic England, "No. 14 Stone Fold, Haslingden (1163624)", National Heritage List for England
- Historic England, "Clod Farmhouse, Haslingden (1072807)", National Heritage List for England
- Historic England, "Kiln Field Farmhouse, Haslingden (1072818)", National Heritage List for England
- Historic England, "Barn circa 20 metres south of Kiln Field Farmhouse, Haslingden (1163618)", National Heritage List for England
- Historic England, "Hen Heads Farmhouse, Haslingden (1163574)", National Heritage List for England
- Historic England, "The Lindens, Haslingden (1163615)", National Heritage List for England
- Historic England, "Duckworth monument circa 10 metres south of Church of St. James, Haslingden (1072847)", National Heritage List for England
- Historic England, "Mansion House Farmhouse, Haslingden (1072819)", National Heritage List for England
- Historic England, "Nos. 16 and 18 Stone Fold with garden wall to front and attached barn to right, Haslingden (1361968)", National Heritage List for England
- Historic England, "Three linked monuments to members of Lonsdale family, circa 12 metres south of Church of St. James, Haslingden (1163505)", National Heritage List for England
- Historic England, "Fold House, Haslingden (1361963)", National Heritage List for England
- Historic England, "Nos. 6 and 8 Church Street, Haslingden (1361944)", National Heritage List for England
- Historic England, "Nos. 4 to 14 Coal Hey, Haslingden (1072805)", National Heritage List for England
- Historic England, "Carter Place Hall, Haslingden (1163485)", National Heritage List for England
- Historic England, "Causeway Head Farmhouse, Haslingden (1361964)", National Heritage List for England
- Historic England, "Barn circa 15 metres east of No.1 Gregory Fold, Haslingden (1072808)", National Heritage List for England
- Historic England, "Hey Meadow Farmhouse, Haslingden (1072821)", National Heritage List for England
- Historic England, "Snig Hole Cottages, Haslingden (1318179)", National Heritage List for England
- Historic England, "Church of St. James, Haslingden (1361943)", National Heritage List for England
- Historic England, "Higher Mill Museum, Haslingden (1072811)", National Heritage List for England
- Historic England, "Nos. 241 to 247 Holcombe Road, Haslingden (1072814)", National Heritage List for England
- Historic England, "Elton Banks, Haslingden (1072820)", National Heritage List for England
- Historic England, "Museum of the Lancashire Textile Industry, Haslingden (1163545)", National Heritage List for England
- Historic England, "Nos. 250–264 Holcombe Road, Haslingden (1163554)", National Heritage List for England
- Historic England, "Nos. 1–21 Bowker Street and 1-5 Aitken Street, Haslingden (1072846)", National Heritage List for England
- Historic England, "Nos. 2–24 Bowker Street and 7–11 Aitken Street, Haslingden (1318229)", National Heritage List for England
- Historic England, "Syke House, Haslingden (1361967)", National Heritage List for England
- Historic England, "The Woolpack Inn, Haslingden (1361966)", National Heritage List for England
- Historic England, "Ravenshore Viaduct, Haslingden (1361642)", National Heritage List for England
- Historic England, "Two railway viaducts and linking revetment, Haslingden (1072813)", National Heritage List for England
- Historic England, "Church of St. Thomas, Haslingden (1072810)", National Heritage List for England
- Historic England, "Britannia Mill, Haslingden (1428080)", National Heritage List for England
- Historic England, "Methodist Church, Haslingden (1163587)", National Heritage List for England
- Historic England, "No. 29 Manchester Road, Haslingden (1361965)", National Heritage List for England
- Historic England, "Chimney to Higher Mill, Haslingden (1072812)", National Heritage List for England
- Historic England, "Church of St. Stephen, Haslingden (1361962)", National Heritage List for England
- Historic England, "No. 31 Manchester Road, Haslingden (1072817)", National Heritage List for England
- Historic England, "Church of St. John the Evangelist, Haslingden (1361942)", National Heritage List for England
- Historic England, "Church of St. Peter, Haslingden (1072816)", National Heritage List for England
- Historic England, "Gateway to Victoria Park, Haslingden (1072809)", National Heritage List for England
- Historic England, "Grane Mill, Haslingden including boundary walls and north yard (1429217)", National Heritage List for England
- Historic England, "Helmshore War Memorial clock tower, Haslingden (1463395)", National Heritage List for England
- Historic England, "War Memorial in Memorial Gardens, Haslingden (1163597)", National Heritage List for England
- Historic England, Listed Buildings
