= Snighole =

Tourist spot, Lancashire, England

Snighole or Snig Hole is a local beauty spot situated in the valley of the River Ogden in the Lancashire village of Helmshore, near Haslingden in the Rossendale Valley, Lancashire, England.

The word snig is a local dialect term for eel. (Snig can also be a word for grass snake in parts of Lancashire.)

The Ravenshore viaduct by Snighole is locally known as 'Little Blackpool', and was particularly popular in the late nineteenth and early twentieth century as a bathing place when people had neither the time or resources to travel far for their leisure. In the later part of the twentieth century the river suffered from serious pollution from local industry, although this is now very much improved. In the river close to the viaduct there are scratched drawings in the rocks dating back to the time when the area was much used by local bathers.
