= Alden Valley =

Valley in Lancashire, England

Coordinates: 53.673°N 2.347°W

Alden Valley, Helmshore: Alden
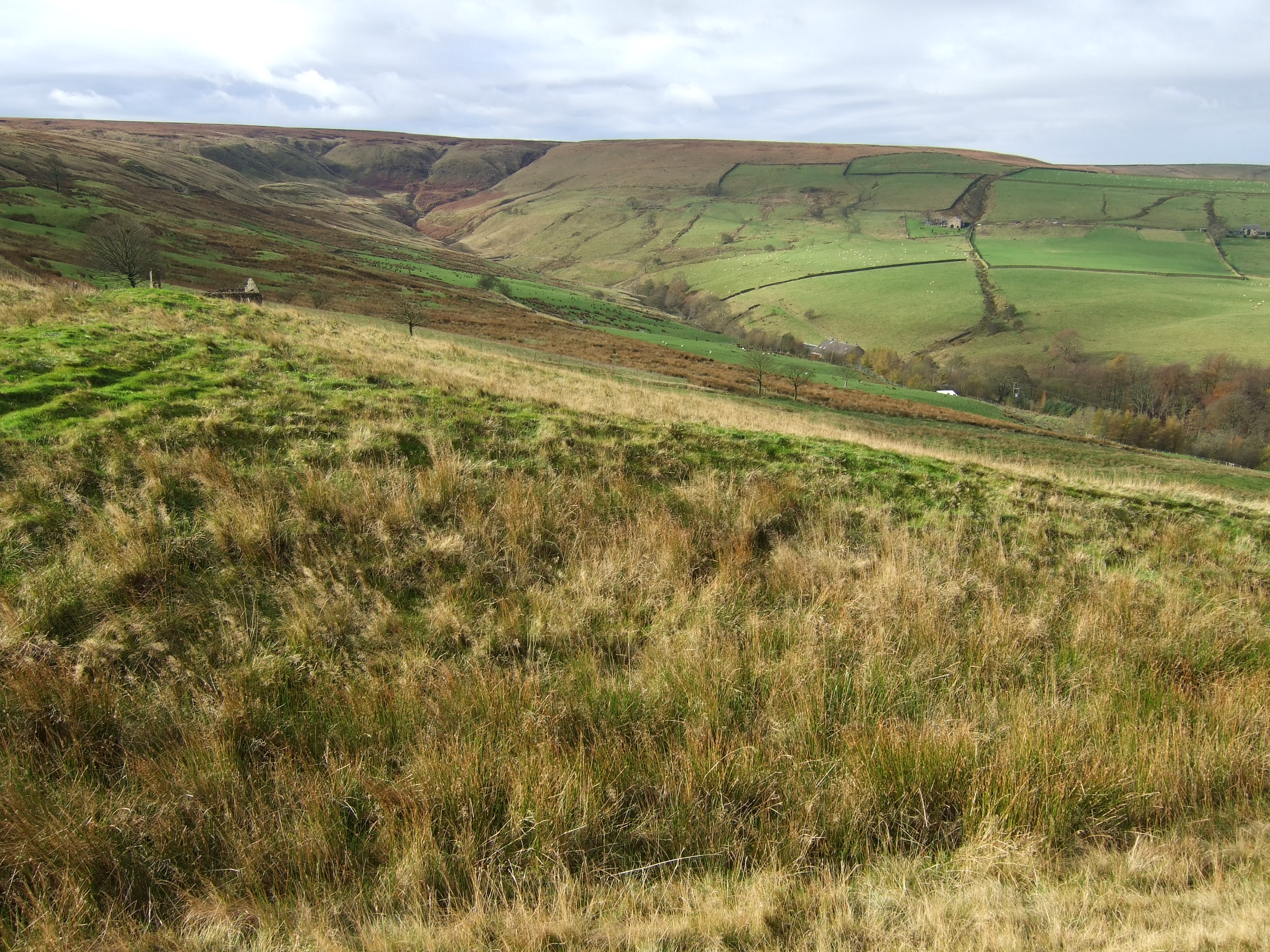
- Alden from Stake Lane in 2007

- Shown within Rossendale Location within Lancashire
- OS grid reference: SD772197
- District: Rossendale
- Shire county: Lancashire
- Region: North West
- Country: England
- Sovereign state: United Kingdom
- Post town: ROSSENDALE
- Postcode district: BB4
- Dialling code: 01706
- Police: Lancashire
- Fire: Lancashire
- Ambulance: North West
- UK Parliament: Rossendale and Darwen

The Alden Valley is a small valley on the eastern edge of the West Pennine Moors, west of Helmshore in Rossendale, Lancashire, England. In the 14th century it was part of the Earl of Lincoln's hunting park. By 1840 it was home to about twenty farms, largely involved in cattle rearing, although most inhabitants were also involved with the production of textiles, which quickly developed during the Industrial Revolution into the building of textile mills. These have now been demolished and the valley is dominated by sheep grazing, with three working farms and a number of smallholdings.

To the north and north-west is Musbury Tor, to the south-west at the head of the valley is Scholes Height, to the west is Musden Head Moor and Burnt Hill. To the south is Bull Hill and the Holcombe Moor, to the south-east is Beetle Hill. Alden Brook forms from several streams draining Wet Moss on the north-western slopes of Scholes Height, which join after flowing through several gullies at an area known as Alden Ratchers. It is the last of the River Ogden's tributaries to join before it joins the River Irwell.

== Etymology of name ==
It has been suggested the name Alden derives from Old English ælf ('elf') + denu ('valley'), thus meaning 'elf-valley'. although the Old English root alor (alder tree) seems an equally likely element.

== Ellen Strange Memorial ==
A story is told of the murder of a young woman by her lover on the footpath to Edgworth above and to the south of Alden Valley. Above Robin Hood's Well, the site is marked by an old cairn, and a stone carved by Rossendale-based artist Don McKinlay was erected by Horse and Bamboo Theatre at a special performance in 1978. The story was also commemorated by a Victorian ballad written by John Fawcett Skelton. The memorial is on Beetle Hill that overlooks the Valley, south of Alden Farm. It can reached by following the track to Robin Hood's Well and continuing onto the moorland.

== Deer Park ==
In 1304–05 Henry de Lacy, 3rd Earl of Lincoln, nominated a large area of land from Grane to Alden Valley as a deer park. There's some uncertainty about the exact size of the park as there are no contemporary records, but it appears to have been between 900 and 1100 acres. A huge ditch was created encircling the area, which included the Alden and Musbury Valleys. £22 10s was paid "to carpenters...for felling timber and making a paling in part of the park". This was a hunting area that fell into disuse over the next few hundred years, although the boundary earthworks can still be clearly seen between Alden Reservoir and Fall Bank. Such hunting parks were status symbols of the period; there were 3,200 of them, covering roughly 2% of the English countryside.

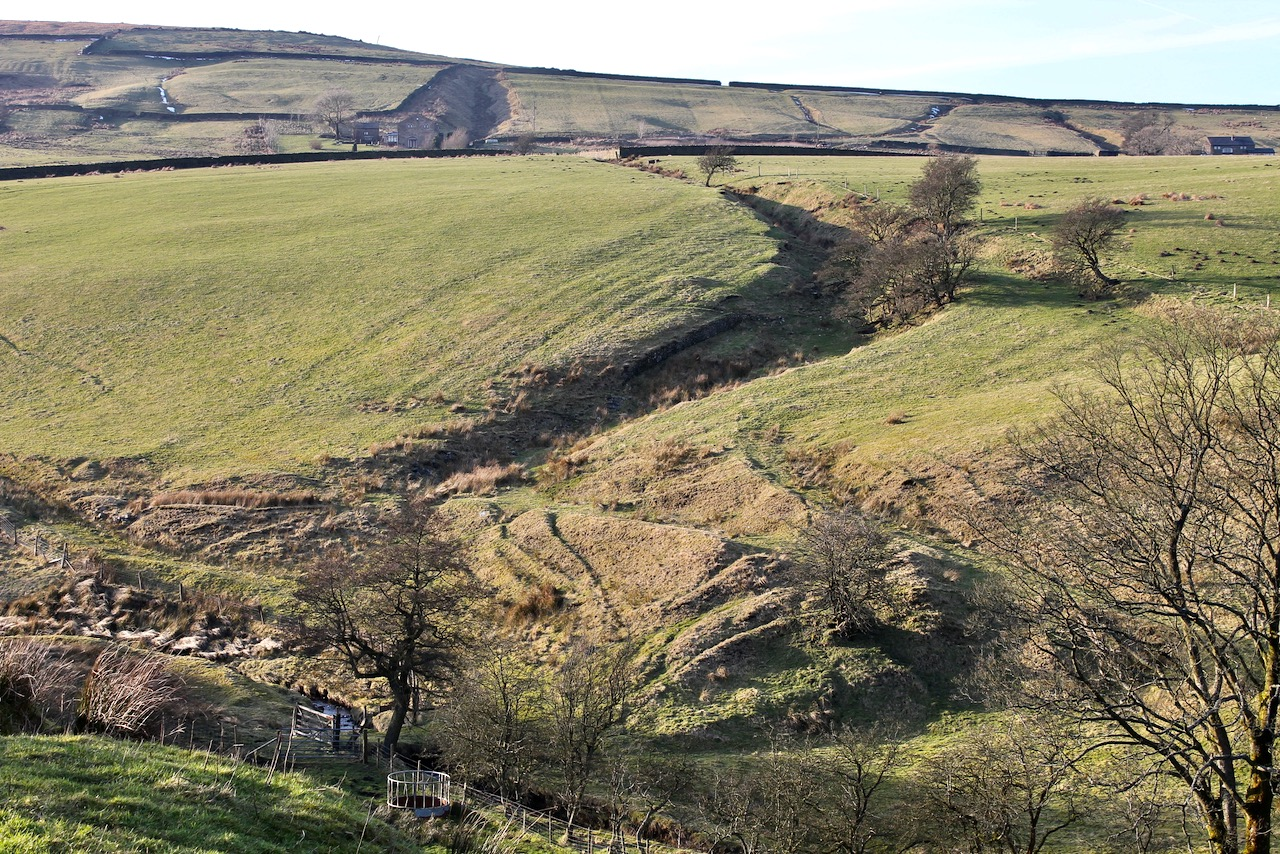
Alden Valley showing the boundary ditch that encircled the medieval deer park.

The boundary would have been close to the old White Horse (Anacapri) along Alden Road to the lodge below Alden Farm. From there it is still recognisable as it climbs the hill. It then crosses Green Height into Musbury and runs down to Musbury Brook, eventually appearing in Grane and close to the Holden Arms. From this point there are no more signs of the earthworks, but it emerged in Station Road, Helmshore, and from there led back to the White Horse.

It would have been stocked with fallow deer. There was at least one gate through the pale in Alden Valley. In 1323 a park-keeper (a parker) was employed and earned 45s 6d (£2.31) a year. By 1480 no park-keepers were employed, and in 1507 parcels of the land that made up the Park were rented out. The site of the original manor house was believed by the historian Thomas Hayhurst to be where Great House Farm cottages are, backing onto Musbury Tor, although this is disputed. Nevertheless, the parcel of land including the Alden section of the old game park was rented to Adam Haworth in 1527. His estate centred on Great House.

== Great House and Tor Side House ==
The first Great House was built at the same time as the Deer Park was laid out. A date stone from a second Great House is built into the nearby farm building with the date 1600 and the initials RHAH (probably Ralph and Alice Haworth, who owned the house at that date). Below Great House, surrounded by trees and south of Musbury Tor, is Tor Side House. This was built about 1868 by Joseph Porritt for his own occupation. The relative tranquility of Alden Valley (and the fact that it was to the west, and protected by the prevailing wind from the smoke from his own mills) provided a suitable place for his son, William John Porritt, to create a house for himself, sufficiently distant from his own mills and the associated poverty. Porritt bought up most of the farmhouses in the valley, making his family the largest landowner. The Porritts were great tree-planters and planted most of the wooded areas seen today in the lower valley. Later, in the early 1900s, it was remodelled and extended by the Porritt family. From 1949 until 1982 it housed the offices of Great House Experimental Farm. In 2010 it was the setting for the BBC drama series Survivors.

== Other farms ==
In the 17th century it became possible to buy up parcels of land outside of the old park boundary, and thus create new farm holdings. There are still remaining ridge and furrow rows visible under certain conditions, demonstrating past land cultivation. The majority of these farmsteads are situated on the spring line. Christopher Cronkshaw did this and built Cronkshawfold Farm in 1631. Top o' th' Rake was built immediately afterwards, at the site of the present Alden Farm. In the early 19th century the last of the Alden valley farms was built at Spring Bank, on the south-facing slopes of the valley. These farms had access to Holcombe Moor, which enabled them to supplement the resources of their direct landholdings. Many of them had rights to graze animals, but also the right of turbary. This meant the right to cut peat to use as fuel, as well as to make turf embankments. There was also the right to dig stone on their land.

== Early mills ==
Most of the farms built in the 17th century would have combined farming with textile making, with a loom or two in one of the farmhouse rooms. By the end of the 18th century the first small water-powered mills were built in Alden. Midge Hole Mill was built in 1794 and the original Sunnybank Mill in 1798. The first purpose-built cotton mill was Higher Alden Mill, built in 1810, near the small bridge below Alden Farm (then known as Top o' th' Rake). Its output was estimated as being just two and a half horse-power. In the 1820s a larger mill with a reservoir was built just downstream, in what is now Alden Wood. These small mills were to disappear by the second half of the 19th century, as the large mills of Turner and Porritt and others and associated housing grew up in Helmshore around the turnpikes and railway. The outlying mills in Alden were no longer practical, and the valley reverted to farming.

== Sunnybank Mill (site of) ==
The estate built in the late 1990s above Wood Bank in Helmshore is the site of Sunny Bank Mill, built by Joseph Porritt at the end of the 19th century on the site of his smaller and older mills. For a time it had the longest loom in the world and was one of the world's largest producers of industrial felt (mainly for papermaking). His quarries in the Alden Valley provided stone for his buildings in St Annes on Sea. In the 1970s the mill was sold to developers and was eventually demolished in 1977, including the chimney which had been one of Helmshore's dominant landmarks. There is still the base of a wall of one of the mill buildings in the woods close by, and a large cutting into the hillside. These are some of the only remnants of the mill to survive.

== Robin Hoods Well ==
On Stake Lane, the moor road south from Dowry Head, is a well associated with the legend of Robin Hood. Legend has it that a depression in a stone above a spring there was where Robin Hood put his foot while stopping for a drink. The road was believed to be a pilgrims' route to Whalley Abbey, but more recently it has been identified as a drove road. The well was likely to have been a resting place on this route. There was an annual Robin Hood festival celebrated in Bury until 1810. The route today is a popular recreation site for walkers and cyclists, and is the way from the valley to the cairn of Ellen Strange.

A view from near the top of Robin Hood's Well. Pendle Hill is just visible in the background.

== Township of Pilkington ==
Deep into Alden Valley, on the north side of the brook, can be found the ruins of Alden Old Mill, an old bleach works built by Robert 'Rough Robin' Pilkington. He acquired his name because of his invariable habit of claiming the weather was 'a bit rough'. Still known as the Township of Pilkington, the ruins of his farm (Spring Bank Farm) can be found above the ruined mill. He enclosed common land and would not pay his rates and was therefore refused poor relief during the depression in the 1820s.

== During WWII ==
The local historian Chris Aspin remembers that "four Home Guardsmen armed with one old rifle and six rounds of ammunition" climbed to the top of Musbury Tor each evening to keep watch. They had a small hut for shelter, but there was no telephone and in the event of an invasion one of the guards would have had to run down to their HQ in Musbury School. He also reports that GIs held exercises in Alden with live ammunition, and remembers discovering a live shell. According to the West Pennine Way guide, American GIs set up camp on the flat top of Musbury Tor to practise paratroop drops and field exercises in the area with live ammunition before D-Day.

== Moorland management ==
In December 2019 work started at Alden Ratchers, the high moorland at the head of Alden valley. This work continued until April 2020. The area is blanket bog that was formed over 6,000 years, and this has led to a peat layer of up to three metres deep. Over the past century, much of this bog has been badly damaged, mostly by attempts to drain the land believing it would improve grazing. The effect of the drainage has caused a number of environmental problems. The land is no longer as suitable for breeding moorland birds and it has increased the likelihood of flooding downstream, which has become an increasing problem affecting the village of Helmshore and downstream. The peat is also no longer able to store carbon, something which makes it such a valuable resource in reducing the carbon in our atmosphere.

A number of agencies including Natural England and the local Commoners' Association have supported this work. It has a number of aims, including creating permeable dams to restrict the flow of flood water. This work was carried out by transporting stones by helicopter from a quarry a kilometre away. Pools were also excavated in some areas to reduce the free flow of water across the moorland surface. Sphagnum moss has been introduced in the newly rewetted areas, which will help to make the top layers of the peat more permeable, and thus able to retain water, rather than it flowing freely as it does currently.

== Gallery ==
A waterfall in the Alden Ratchers tributary

Snowdrift on Wet Moss at the end of the valley between Helmshore and Edgeworth, during February 2009.
