= Musbury Valley =

Valley in Lancashire, England

Coordinates: 53.686°N 2.353°W

Musbury Valley, Helmshore: Musbury
- Trees by Musbury Brook

- Shown within Rossendale Location within Lancashire
- OS grid reference: SD772212
- District: Rossendale
- Shire county: Lancashire
- Region: North West
- Country: England
- Sovereign state: United Kingdom
- Post town: ROSSENDALE
- Postcode district: BB4
- Dialling code: 01706
- Police: Lancashire
- Fire: Lancashire
- Ambulance: North West
- UK Parliament: Rossendale and Darwen

The Musbury Valley is a small valley in the Helmshore area of Rossendale Valley, Lancashire. Musbury Brook flows through its length, and its south side is flanked and dominated by Musbury Tor. In the 14th century it was part of the Earl of Lincoln's hunting park. Most of the Musbury valley is now sheep grazing pasture. To the south is Musbury Tor and Alden Valley; to the north-west is Musbury Heights and, beyond, the Grane Valley. Beginning as Long Grain Water on Musden Head Moor, the stream becomes Musbury Brook after its confluence with Short Grain Water. It flows in a north-westerly direction to join the River Ogden, a tributary of the River Irwell.

== Musbury Park ==
In 1305 a huge ditch and earth bank were dug to enclose a large area that included most of the west side of Musbury township (later becoming Helmshore). A palisade of oak stakes created a fence on the outside of the ditch which extended from Grane Valley in the north to Alden Valley in the south. This created an enclosure to keep in fallow deer for the estate of Hugh de Lacy, and supplying venison for his table. Musbury Valley was at the heart of the deer park, which covered 1,713 acres, and the area was known as Musbury Park.

Although deer parks were very fashionable at the beginning of the 14th century, by the middle of the century many parks were in decline, hastened by the introduction of the Black Death. From 1480 no park-keepers were employed, and in 1507 a survey reported that the park was closed down. The old park area was then divided into eight different holdings, four of which included sections of Musbury valley. The process of enclosing parts of the old park and Musdenhead, at the head of the valley and which had been outside the boundaries of the park, continued through the 16th and 17th centuries. By the first detailed map in the 1840s there were well over 20 farms in the valley.

== Farming ==
During the period after the decline of the hunting park most people in the valley made a living combining farming and textile making. Raising cattle, sheep, pigs and poultry, and growing a few cereal crops on their land. Inventories in the 17th/early 18th centuries show corn, oats and barley being grown. There is a tradition of illegal Musbury whisky distilling too. In 1881 James Barlow, known as "Musbury Jim" was caught at Hare Clough with a whisky still. He was fined £10. Several farms near Hare Clough were raided by excise men in the 1880s and there are stories of distilling in Musbury throughout the 19th century. The moorland also gave the farming community turbary rights, this being the ability to take peat from the upper moorland peat beds for fuel. Sods of peat could also be used for repairing banks, although stone quarrying meant that walls could be built from the stone taken from the moorland. These dry stone walls are still characteristic of the area.

== Textiles ==
From the 16th to the 18th century, textile production was small-scale and complemented the farming work. Tannery work also developed, tanning leather, and Tan Pits is a name still given to the Helmshore end of the valley. But in the 18th century, the textile industry developed rapidly, with the brook providing a source of water-power. In 1790 the first mill was built at Tan Pits, and others soon joined them. The first mills were used for carding wool, or fulling and finishing woollen cloth, but a change from wool to cotton started soon after 1800. This developed first in Alden Valley, but soon the Turner family began building much larger mills in the Musbury area and by the early 19th century they were one of the largest textile firms, and had several mills in the township of Musbury. William Turner died in 1852, while the Porritt family were developing Sunnybank and for a while, during the cotton famine, things were less secure in the Musbury mills. However, the new owners, the Ashworths, expanded Turner's Middle Mill and were soon employing 200 workers in their mills.

The older mills in Musbury began to disappear after 1850, as production switched from the outlying districts to the new village that was growing up in Helmshore, and this pattern continued to be the case. In 1883 the unit of local government known as Musbury was abolished and it became known as Helmshore. During the 20th century the textile industry declined severely, and most of the mills were closed. After WWII the remaining companies pooled resources and opened a research centre which, in 1956 moved across Holcombe Road into a new building, but this finally closed in 1981.

== Water Board ==
The farms at the head of the valley fell in to disuse relatively early, and the Porritt family, who had rights to shoot in the surrounding moorland, built kennels in the garden of Longfield House, which had been built about 1800 by the Worsick family. But in 1929 the Porritts left Helmshore and in 1934 they sold their land – 806 acres – in Musbury valley to the Irwell Valley Water Board. A plan to flood the valley and create a reservoir was developed throughout the 1950s. During this period much of the valley was abandoned and fell into disrepair, but access remained available and so it became a popular picnic and walking area. The reservoir was never built.

Heavy rain in July 1964 caused a flood which destroyed much of the brook-side footpath at the bottom of the valley.

== Musbury Heights ==
On the north-west side of the valley is Musbury Heights. Between 1850 and 1931, this area was an extensive quarry working the Lower Haslingden Flag. It is now disused but has been tidied by the Rossendale Groundwork Valley of Stone project. The ruins of several buildings and a (rebuilt) Scrubbing Mill chimney remain, along with a number of spoil heaps and old workings, including an extensive tramway system, including an incline. The quarry produced mainly road setts (cobbles), kerbstones and flagstones.

== Gallery ==
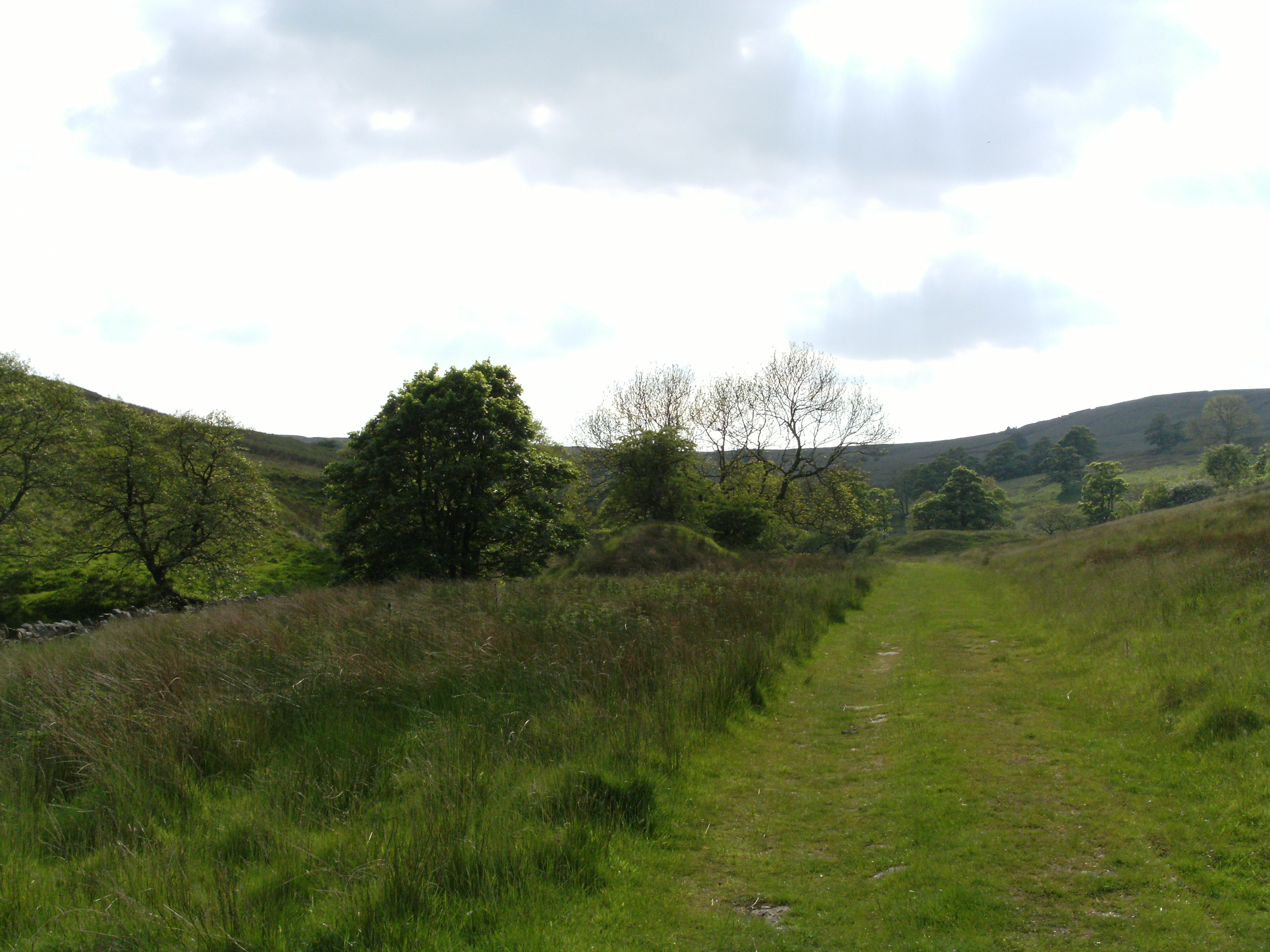
Looking into the valley from the path following the brook.

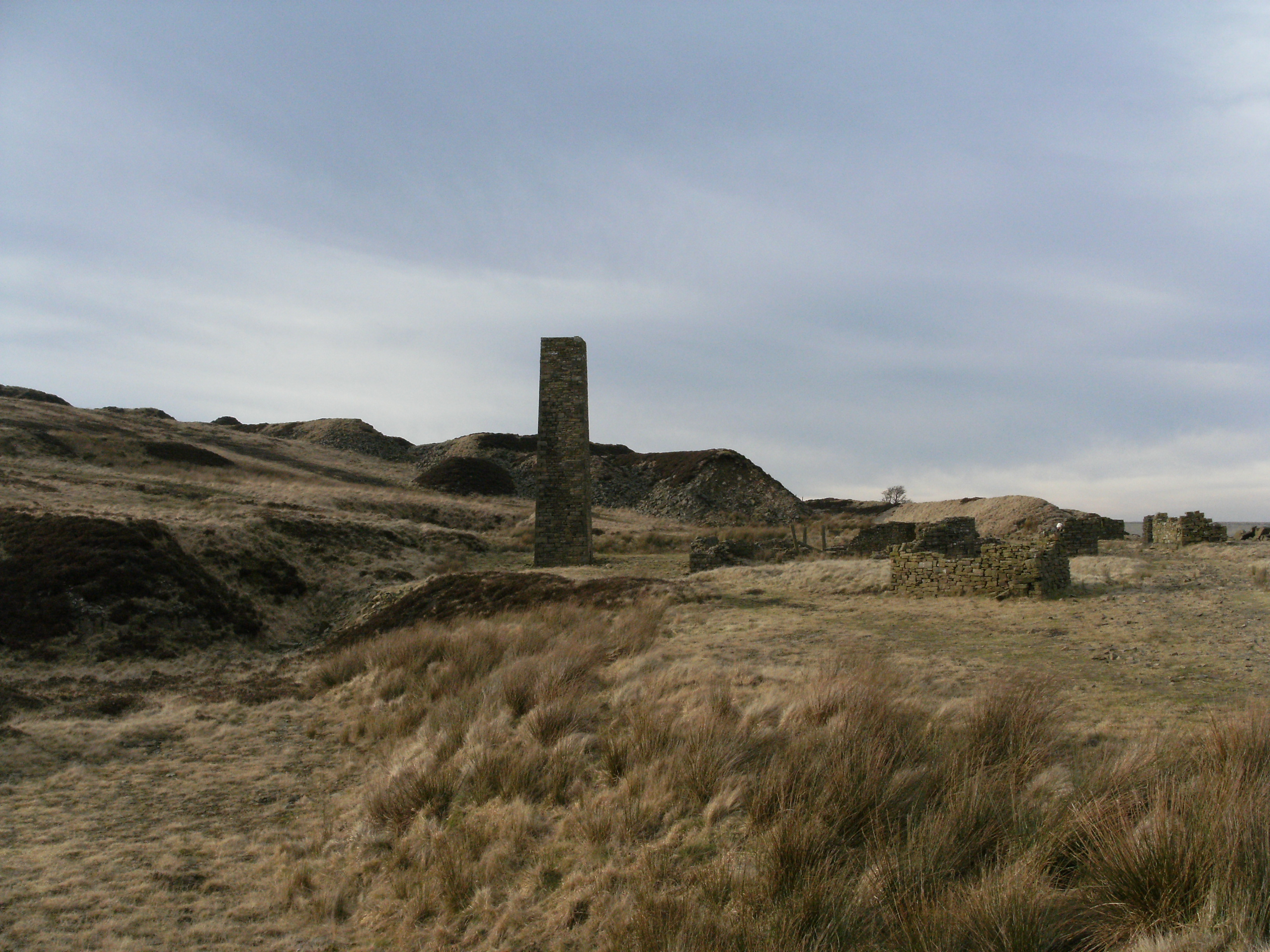
A view of the chimney, ruined buildings and spoil heaps of Musbury heights.
