= Musbury Tor =

Hill in Lancashire, England

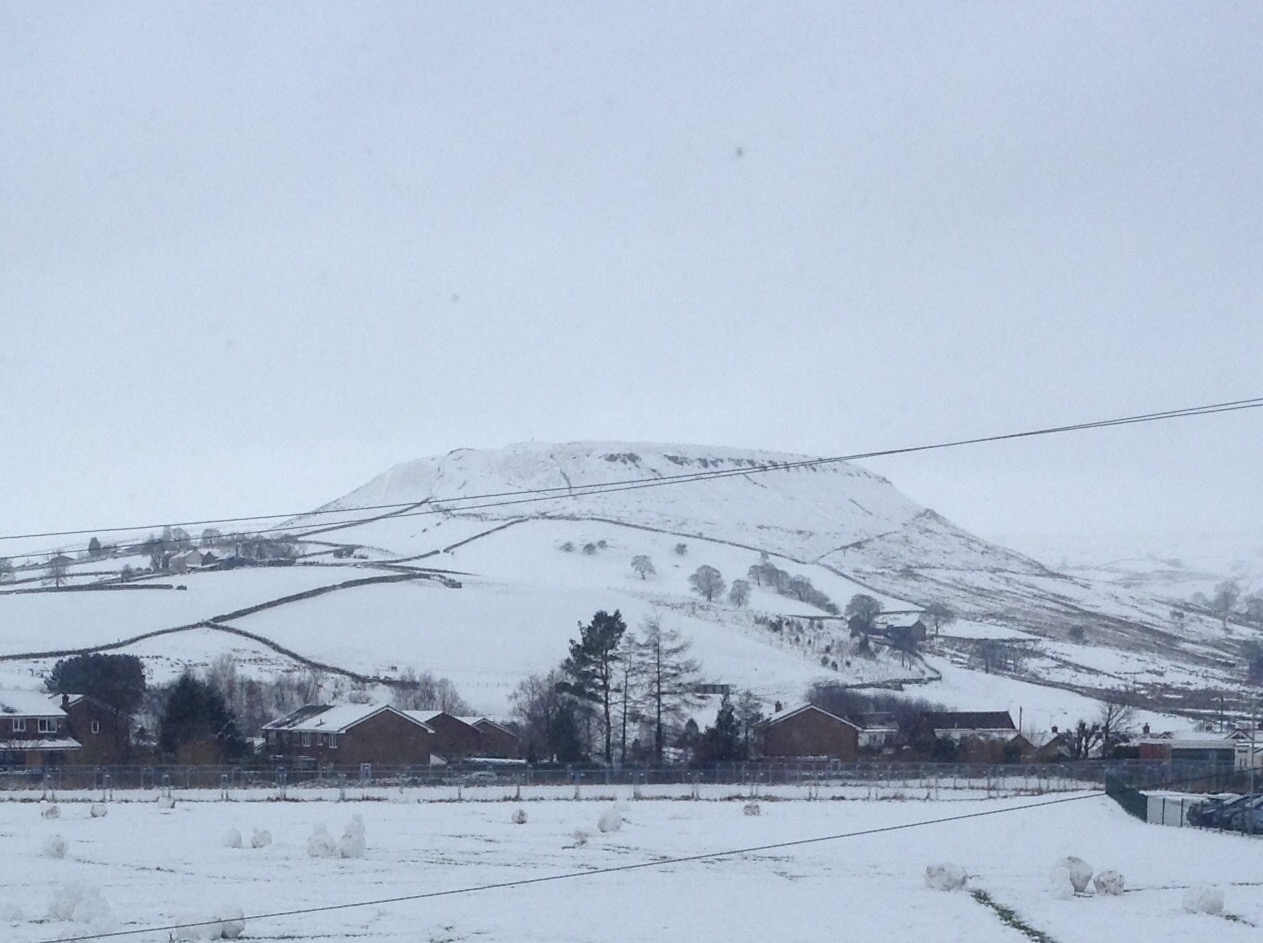
- Musbury Tor in the winter of 2015

Highest point
- Elevation: 340.1 m (1,116 ft)
- Coordinates: 53°40′56″N 2°20′59″W

Geography
- Location within Lancashire Location within the Borough of Rossendale
- Location: Lancashire, England
- OS grid: SD 7699 2068
- Topo map: OS Explorer 287

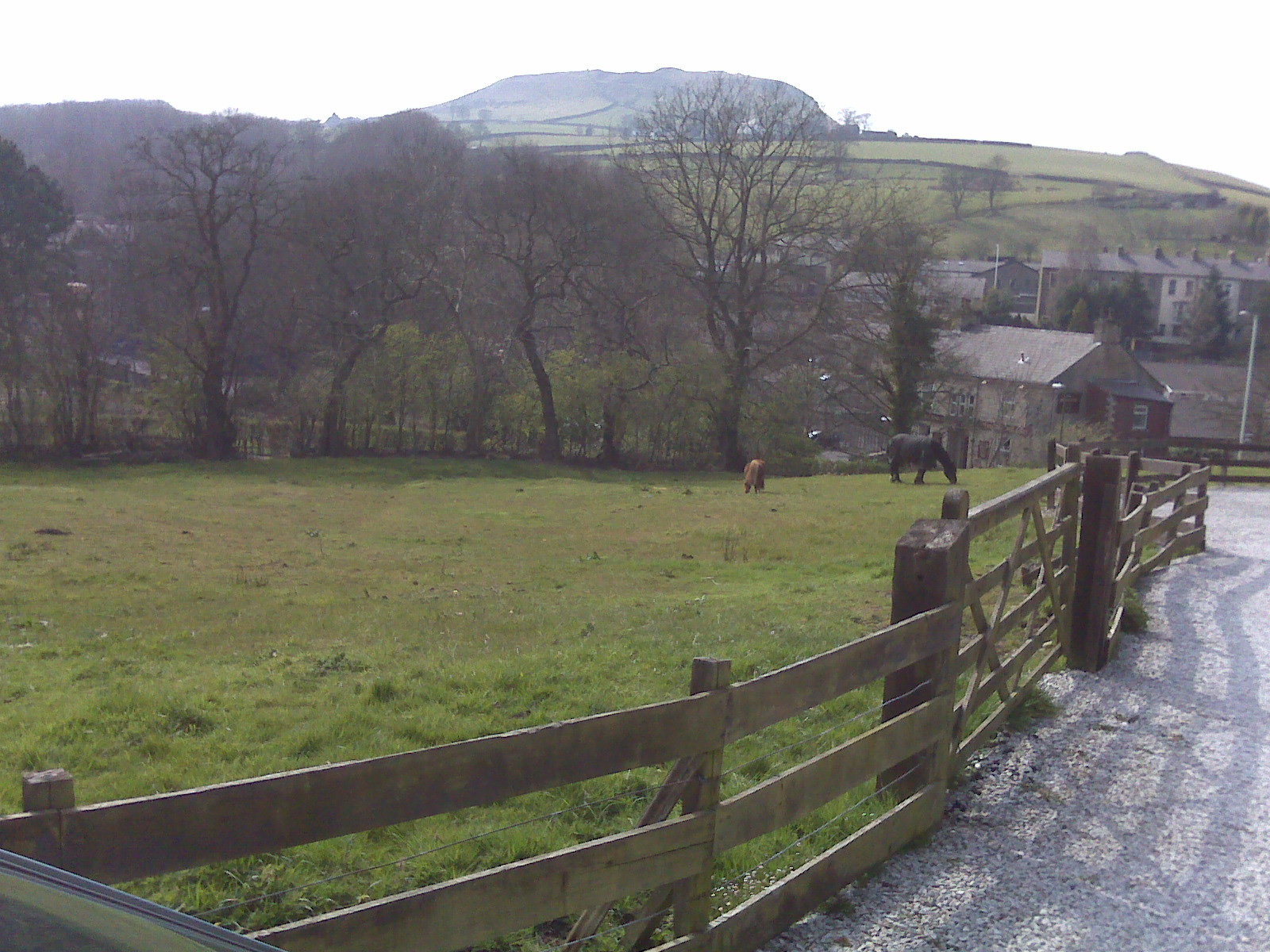
Musbury Tor

Musbury Tor or Tor Hill is a flat-topped hill in south-east Lancashire, England. It overlooks the village of Helmshore and separates Alden Valley to its south and Musbury Valley to its north. Mainly consisting of farmland and pastures, its summit is 340.1 metres (1,116 ft) above sea level. The hill is a prominent landmark and can be seen from much of Helmshore and is often colloquially referred to as ‘the Tor’ by the local population. 'Tor View' is a name shared by several houses and a local Special School.

== Geology ==
The underlying solid geology of the Rossendale fells is largely formed by the Lower coal measures comprising bedded sandstones, shales and mudstones. Rocks of the Millstone Grit series outcrop above the valley of the River Irwell and cap the hills. Musbury Tor is a perfect example of peneplanation leaving an almost isolated flat-topped hill where the harder Millstone Grit protects the softer underlying shales, leaving the distinctive sharp topography of edges and ledges characteristic of the uplands above the Irwell Valley.

The other small-scale topographic variations such as the undulating hummocky landforms are generally due to the former workings and stone quarries.

== History ==
=== Deer park ===
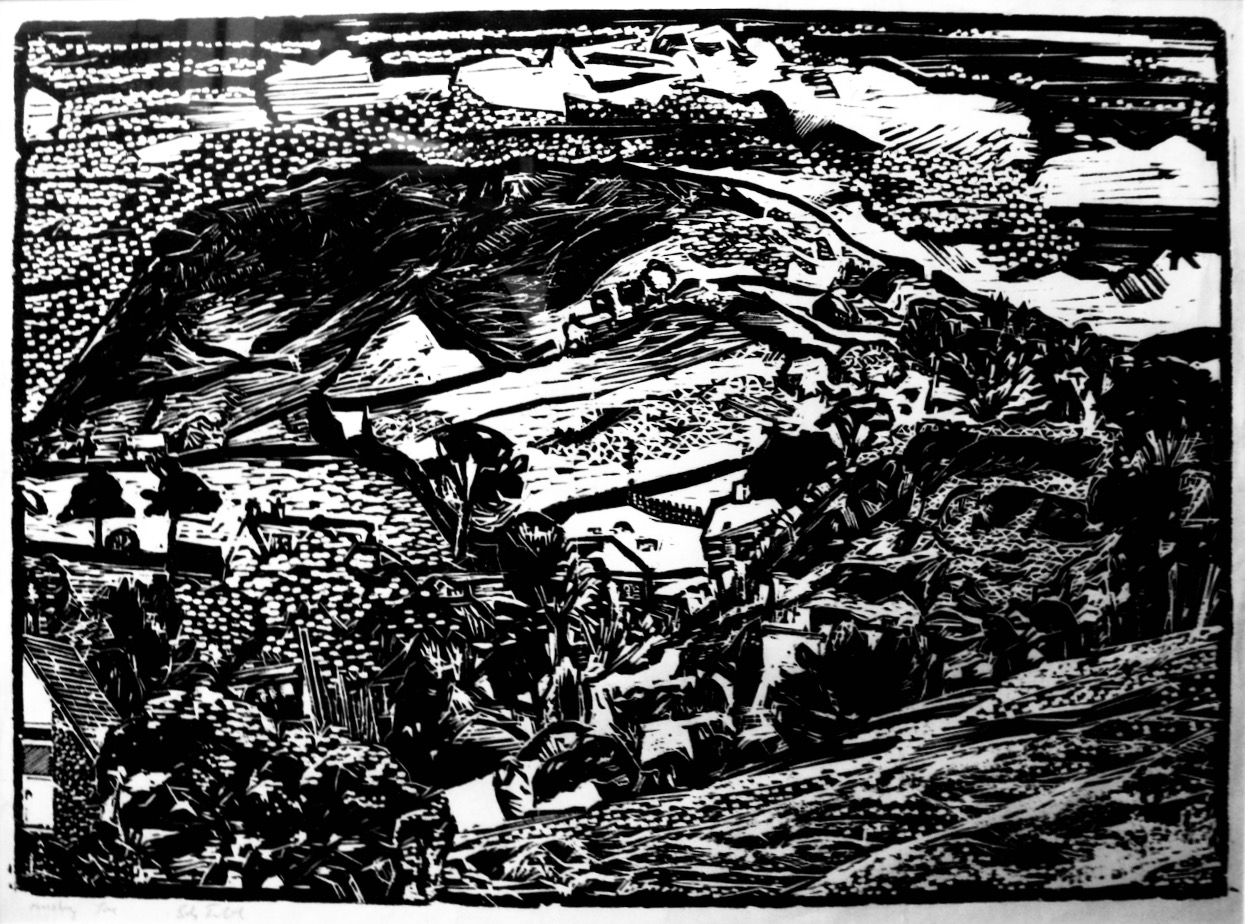
Woodcut of Musbury Tor by Bob Frith

In the 13th century, Musbury was recorded as part of the manor of Tottington. The Rossendale area, as part of the Honour of Clitheroe had been under the control of the de Lacy family since not long after the Norman conquest, and John de Lacy, the Earl of Lincoln acquired the Tottington fee in 1235. John's grandson, Henry de Lacy obtained a grant of free warren in Tottington in 1296, and shortly after created a deer park here, and although detached from the Forest of Rossendale this led to it being included in it. Tor Hill was the dominant feature of the park, with the River Ogden and the surrounding ridges of Musbury Heights, Musden Head, and Alden Moor forming the other boundaries. The costs of constructing the 4.5-mile (7.2 km) paling which surrounded the park are listed in the de Lacy accounts for 1304-05. The wood came from the surrounding area, felled and shaped by carpenters on site, with eighteen oxen specially purchased to cart the pales to Musbury. Almost £83 was spent on the construction, enough to cover the park-keeper or parker's 45 shilling annual payment for over 36 years.

After Henry de Lacy's death in 1311, both Tottington and Clitheroe passed to Thomas, 2nd Earl of Lancaster who had been married to his daughter and heiress Alice. After Lancaster's execution in 1322, control reverted to the crown. The next year a new deer-leap was added at a cost of 18 shillings to allow animals to enter the park, but prevent them from leaving. In 1327 the honour was among the lands granted to Queen Isabella, the mother of Edward III. During her control of the park there are a number of records of trespass, including in 1334 when a large group including the rector of Bury broke in and carried away the venison. As the attainder of Thomas of Lancaster had been annulled, upon the death of Alice de Lacy in 1348, the honour was reincorporated into the Earldom of Lancaster, later becoming part of the Duchy of Lancaster.

Before 1361 grazing rights within the park were leased out, initially to the park-keeper, and the practice continued through the 15th century. A decree issued in 1480 ordered the payments stopped to officers of the park as there was no game to keep, however is doesn't seem to have been enforced. And the rights and privileges of several officers including the park-keeper, the constable and porter of Clitheroe Castle, and the bailiff of Salford Hundred were confirmed in a 1485 act. The commissioners of Henry VII, who surveyed the crown lands in Lancashire in 1507, reported that the "closure is downe" and although the deer still had recourse within the park it was used as a pasture. Authorised to grant forest land as copyhold leases, they divided the park into eight 60 acre parcels and it was subsequently developed as farmland. The closest farms to the Tor were also granted rights to take turf and stone from the hill.

The precise area of the park is somewhat uncertain as although stretches of the ditches from the enclosure still remain in the Alden and Musbury valleys, along Ogden Brook the boundary is only suggested to have been a little west of Holcombe Road. Conversion from the customary acre of the Middle Ages to imperial units is complicated because of the range of rod-lengths in use in Lancashire, however the area still known as Musbury Park in the 19th century was recorded to be 904 acres (366 ha). In the latter half of the century most of Musbury had become part of the mill-owning Porritt Estate. In the 1880s William John Porritt began to farm the shelf of land at the back of the Tor, building shippons and other animal housing. The is area became known as The Exe.

=== Musbury township ===
The old township was divided into three portions: Musbury Park, Musden Head (to the southwest), and the Trippet of Ogden (in the northwest). Although it remained part of Bury's ancient parish (in Salford Hundred), it had become part of the Hundred of Blackburn by the 1500s. Musbury became a civil parish in 1866. In 1894 it became part of the Municipal borough of Haslingden.

=== WWII ===
During the war most of the remaining farms around the Tor farmed dairy cows and poultry. By early 1943 Great House had converted from milking their cows by hand to using electricity.

During World War II a Home Guard unit of just four men armed with a single old rifle and six rounds of ammunition climbed each evening to the top of the Tor to man a tiny observation post, often stumbling into bogs and old quarry workings. Headquarters were in Musbury School, in Helmshore village and should there have been an invasion, the only way to have alerted anyone was to race on foot from the top of Tor to into the village. American GIs also practised paratroop drops, and field exercises with live ammunition, before D-Day, setting up tents and a cookhouse by Great House on the Tor.

=== Post-war ===
Oliver Porritt had sold most of his property to Porritts and Spencer Ltd in 1932, and they in turn sold it to the Ministry of Agriculture in 1951. In 1952 the Great House Experimental Farm in Helmshore was established by the Ministry on the flat top and southern slopes of Musbury Tor. The 350-acre site was an ideal acquisition for trialling high-level farming techniques, including many on grain planting and animal husbandry. Analyses of the effects of acidity in rain were carried out, air quality was measured, and even the effect of sonic bangs on livestock was monitored. The offices and accommodation were sited in Tor Side House, and the farm eventually employed over 30 personnel. Great House Experimental Farm was closed in 1982, broken up and sold off to private farmers and others.
