= Helmshore =

Village in Lancashire, England

Coordinates: 53.687°N 2.329°W

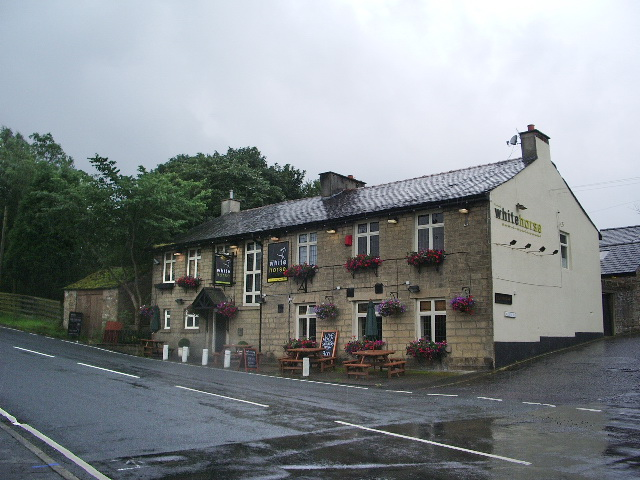
- The former White Horse public house (now private housing)

- Location within Rossendale Location within Lancashire
- Population: 5,805 (2011.Ward)
- OS grid reference: SD782212
- District: Rossendale
- Shire county: Lancashire
- Region: North West
- Country: England
- Sovereign state: United Kingdom
- Post town: ROSSENDALE
- Postcode district: BB4
- Dialling code: 01706
- Police: Lancashire
- Fire: Lancashire
- Ambulance: North West
- UK Parliament: Hyndburn, Rossendale and Darwen

Helmshore (/hɛlmˈʃɔːr/) is a village in the Rossendale Valley, Lancashire, England, south of Haslingden between the A56 and the B6235, 16 miles (26 km) north of Manchester. The population at the 2011 census was 5,805. The housing in Helmshore is mixed, with some two-up, two-down terraces, top-and-bottom houses and a few surviving back-to-back cottages. Between the 1970s and 2020 new housing estates have proliferated.

== History ==
=== Early history ===
The area around Helmshore is moorland. Post-Ice Age this would have been forested, and bog oak can still be found on the flat peatland tops over 250 metres high. The forest declined in the Neolithic period, and largely disappeared during the Bronze Age, mainly as a result of climatic change although hastened by human activity. There is some evidence of human habitation in the area during the Neolithic period: stone implements found on Bull Hill and in the Musbury valley, and the stones at Thirteen Stone Hill near Grane, and there are a relatively complex network of both local and long-distance old tracks crossing the area.

=== The Park ===
The village is dominated by the spectacular flat-topped Musbury Tor, once the centre of the medieval hunting park, or Forest. Either side of the Tor are two valleys: Alden Valley in the south-west and Musbury Valley to the north-west. The 'whole land of Musbury' was granted to John de Lacy (before 1241) by Lewis de Bernavill. A licence for a 'free warren' was granted to the Earl of Lincoln in 1294. Work on fencing the Park was completed by 1304–05, with palings being erected. The park, with its 'herbage and agistments' was said to be worth 13s. 4d. in 1311. In 1329 and 1330 it is described as 'Queen Isabel's park of Musbury', and fines were being applied for trespass to, among others, the rector of Bury. Stretches of the ditch enclosure are clearly visible at Grane and Alden valleys, and deer are still occasionally seen in the area. There are several current placenames identifying the Park.

=== The pilgrims' route ===
One of the main early tracks that passed through Helmshore was a route from the south (by the Pilgrim's Cross which was in existence in AD 1176) on Holcombe Moor, and then goes through Haslingden on its way to Whalley. This also connected with Watling Street at Affetside, and a well-established way from Bolton to Rossendale. In Anglo-Saxon times, Whalley church was an important Minster and the mother church of an enormous parish. Later, in the medieval period, several chapels-of-ease were attached to Whalley church for the 'ease' of the scattered population providing access to the Mass and the sacraments. After the move made by the Cistercian monks of Stanlow to Whalley at the end of the 13th century, traffic would have increased along this route. In April 2020 the historian Mark Fletcher, in an article 'So Who Were the Medieval Pilgrims?' questioned this theory, and suggested the perhaps rather more plausible alternative that these 'pilgrims routes' were actually used by drovers, moving livestock from grazing areas to markets.

To the south on the old pilgrim road is Robin Hood's Well, and above that is a cairn and memorial stone in memory of Ellen Strange, generally believed to be a young girl murdered by her lover – an event recorded in a Victorian ballad by John Fawcett Skelton but now known to be a murder of a wife by a husband in 1761 that has become replaced by a colourful, but fictional, story. The ballad was commemorated by Bob Frith and Horse and Bamboo Theatre by an event at the site in June 1978, during which a memorial stone carved by Liverpool artist Don McKinlay was unveiled. These routes fell into disuse for anything other than foot traffic after the turnpike improvements of the 19th century.

=== The Industrial Revolution ===
Helmshore owes its development to a damp climate that was ideally suited to the development of the wool, cotton and linen industries. During the early part of the Industrial Revolution, from the 1790s on, small mills were built on the river valleys, such as Alden Valley where there are still ruins, close to the farming areas – indeed most mill-owners were also farmers. But by the latter half of the 19th century these mills became redundant and industry expanded enormously as mill owners such as the Turner family built terraced dwellings to house the workforce necessary to run their cotton mills close to the roads and railways. During this period Helmshore gradually superseded Musbury as the main name for the community.

Helmshore became a mill workers' settlement, comprising an extensive area of woollen and cotton mills and associated workers' housing built along the valley of the River Ogden. The Turner family first established the settlement, buying land in 1789 and building Higher Mill as a woollen fulling mill powered by two water wheels; later replaced by the one still in existence (now part of the museum). One of the next generation of the family, William Turner (1793-1852) added a larger wool carding and spinning mill, which was steam-powered, in the 1820s. Its chimney is still standing on the opposite hill-side. After a fire in the 1860s the mill was rebuilt, and was later sold to Lawrence Whitaker and his sons in the 1920s. Flaxmoss House on Campion Drive was built as the Turners' residence. Turners also built Tan Pits, a dye works, and the seven-storey, steam-powered Hollin Bank (or Middle Mill) which was built for power looms

The area expanded with the opening of the railway in 1848, and new buildings included the Station Hotel and St Thomas's Church (1851/2). One of the new mill owners who contributed to this expansion was William John Porritt (1820-1896), who was born in Ramsbottom. Porritt worked as a young man at Dearden Clough Mill as a hand-loom weaver and eventually became a cotton merchant. By the standards of the day the Porritts were considered to be good employers. Porritt invested heavily in the new seaside resort of St. Annes, and some of the houses there were built using stone from his Helmshore quarries. He sent workers to see the opening of St. Anne's Pier, organising special trains that ran from Helmshore Station. Porritt mills included the water-powered Bridge End Mill and the huge Sunnybank Mill, which at one time was reputed to have the longest loom in the world. Their mills were famous for industrial felts, some of which were used in the production of bank notes. In 1922 Porritt donated the Memorial Gardens with its clock-tower to the village.

Holden Wood Manufacturing Company, know locally as the Bleach Works, and earlier as Nobels, produced a top secret propellent for aircraft as part of the World War II effort. It was situated at the north of the village, below the reservoirs, on a site that spread across both sides of Holcombe Road. It closed in 1997 and at the time of closure it manufactured cellulose paper, some of which was used in the production of bank notes. The factory was a major contributor to the pollution at that time entering the River Ogden. Despite this the area at the eastern end of the works was a wetland known as The Flash, and was a breeding area for Little Ringed Plover.

=== 1860 rail crash ===
Helmshore rail accident

Details
- Date: 4 September 1860
- Location: Helmshore, Lancashire
- Country: England
- Line: Lancashire and Yorkshire Railway
- Cause: split train

Statistics
- Trains: 2
- Deaths: 11
- Injured: 77

There was a major railway accident in Helmshore in September 1860. There were eleven lives lost and 77 people were injured. The accident happened on the line between Snig Hole and the Ogden Viaduct, both local beauty spots, 400 yards (370 m) from Helmshore station. About 3,000 people had gone from East Lancashire on three excursion trains to Salford to visit the attractions at Belle Vue Gardens.

The second train with about 1,000 passengers and 31 carriages got to Helmshore Station where it stopped to let out some passengers. "When the guard released the brakes there was a jerk and 16 carriages broke away from the train and started sliding down the line between Helmshore and Ramsbottom. Mr Shaw, the superintendent, saw what had happened and unhooked the engine from the train in order to go down the other line to warn the third train, but unfortunately he was too late. The carriages had already run 400 yards (370 m) down the line and collided with the oncoming train."

=== Early bus service ===
One of the world's first municipal bus services linked Helmshore to Haslingden in 1907. The 18-seat Leyland bus was operated by Haslingden Council. It made 14 daily trips with a top speed of 16 mph (26 km/h). In 1919 the Council introduced a 12-seater 'Whippet', which turned round at Woodbank. The driver issued the tickets, making it one of the world's earliest one-man operated bus services.

=== First World War ===
On 25 September 1916 a 179m-long German military Zeppelin airship flew over Helmshore on a bombing mission. It was probably following the railway, attempting to inflict damage on the transport system. One bomb dropped near Clod Lane, Haslingden, where there was a gun cotton factory. Ewood Bridge station was destroyed by bombs and, after passing over Helmshore, the Zeppelin flew on to Holcombe where it did further damage.

=== Second World War ===
The biggest poultry supplier in Britain during the war was Rodwells, who had a large poultry operation between Irongate and Kenyon Clough off Holcombe Road, to the south of Helmshore. By post-war standards it was fairly small, but large-scale poultry production only started elsewhere in the UK during the 1960s. The West Pennine Way guide mentions that American GIs set up camp on the flat top of Musbury Tor to practice paratroop drops and field exercises with live ammunition before D-Day. In 'The Helmshore Historian', published by Helmshore Local History Society during the 1960s, Aspin mentions American paratroopers landing on Bull Hill in the autumn of 1941. He also mentions seeing, as a boy, GIs camped near the bullock sheds above Great House, just before D-Day, and the practicing with live ammunition in Alden Valley.

=== Local ghosts ===
Local historian Chris Aspin mentions a number of ghost stories relating to Helmshore. The 1860 rail accident (see above) has led to stories of a ghost train whose whistle has been heard in the Snig Hole area. There's another railway story, relating to a murder in a trackside hut on the disused line between Helmshore and Ramsbottom, close to Irwell Vale.

=== The old railway line ===
The railway that ran through Helmshore was closed in 1966 as part of the Beeching Axe, but relics of the old railway routes remain in and around the village. The Helmshore viaduct, close to the textile museum, is now a footpath. The Ravenshore viaduct has been vandalised but remains a considerable monument to the railway heritage. Remedial work has been done during 2018/19 to the viaducts relating to Sustrans cycle route, known as 'The Scenic Route Branch Line', part the National Cycle Network Route 6. It links Accrington down through Rossendale via Haslingden and Helmshore to Ramsbottom. As part of this work the Snig Hole/Ravenshore footpath has been upgraded.

=== Recent ===
Helmshore has had a second major expansion since the 1970s with the building of a large number of new estates, and infill, often for commuters to Manchester.

Helmshore was the site of the 2016 murder of businesswoman Sadie Hartley.

== Culture ==
=== Music ===
In 2001 the American musical group The Factory Incident released an EP entitled Helmshore. Karl Hill, one of the guitarists, named it as a tribute to his late mother, Joyce Bargh Hill, who was born in Haslingden and raised in Helmshore.

== Helmshore Mills Textile Museum ==
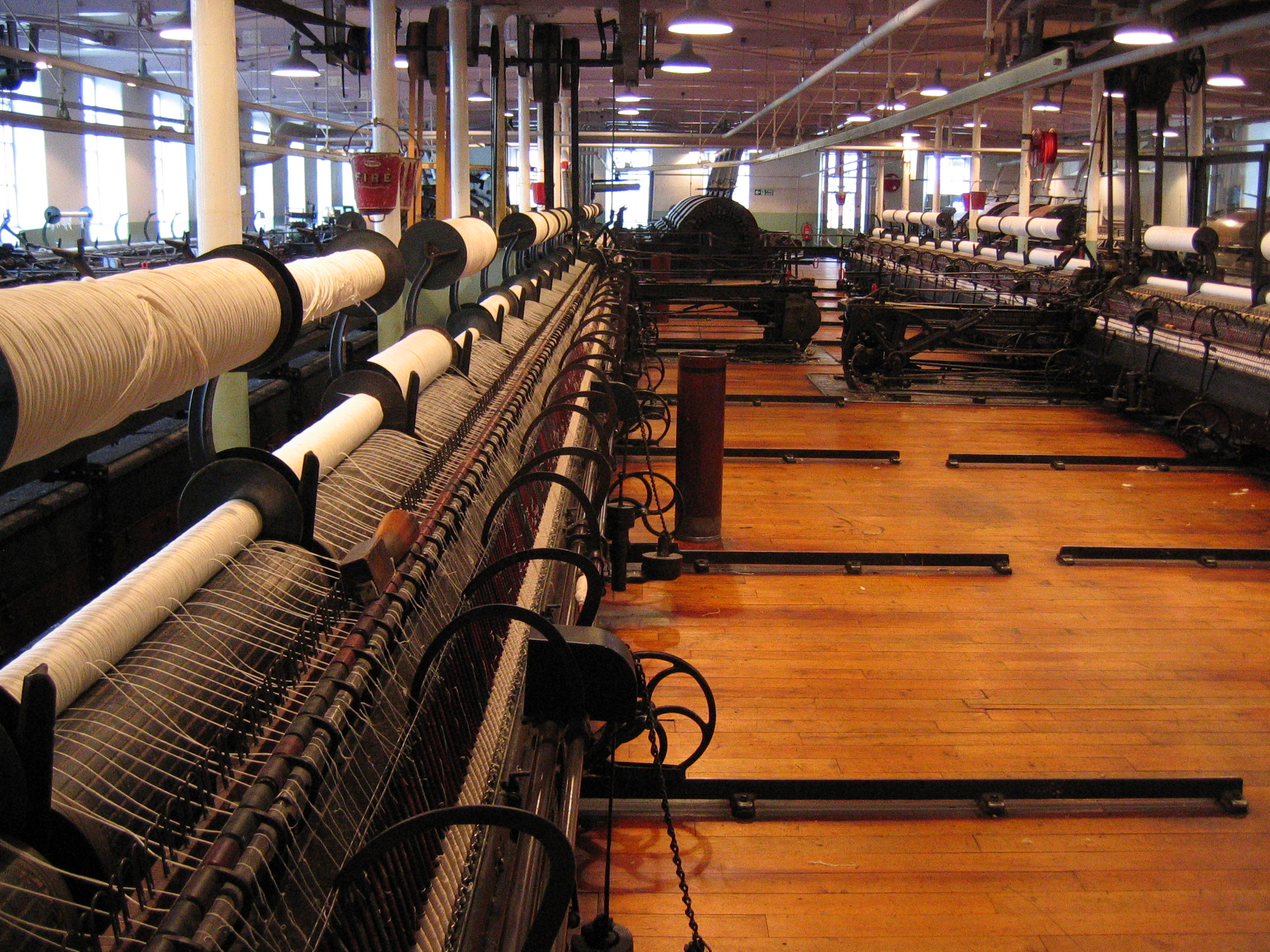
A spinning room in the Helmshore Mills Textile Museum.

Originally Higher Mill, Helmshore Mills Textile Museum is a water-powered fulling mill and a 19th-century condenser cotton spinning mill, with working machinery. Built by the Turners in 1789, and rescued from dereliction by Derek Pilkington and Chris Aspin in the 1960s, it is now managed by Lancashire County Council Museums Service and details the changes made in textile technology over the last three hundred years through the use of interactive displays. Mill ponds, weirs, sluice gates and an aqueduct are also part of the museum as well as a 19th-century working waterwheel, fulling stocks and other machinery associated with the finishing of woollen cloth, an original Arkwright water frame, and a Hargreaves Spinning Jenny. It also houses a museum and bookshop selling, among other things, books on local textile history.

In 1856 Joseph Porritt established Sunnybank Mill, an enormous mill that once housed the world's largest spinning mules. The other main Helmshore mill dynasty were the Whittakers, one of whose mills makes up part of the Textile Museum.

== The Tor Mile Race ==
Every year, an athletics race takes place in Helmshore – The Musbury Tor Mile. The race was first run in 1911, and may have an even older ancestry. Originally the runners ran to, and around, Big Nor, a large stone at the tip of Musbury Tor, and back, but it was stopped after the farmer withdrew permission to use his land. The route was altered to make all parties happy, and it now actually measures two kilometres – 1.2 miles. Since 2004 the race has been taking place again and is part of the fell running tradition of the area.

== Gallery ==
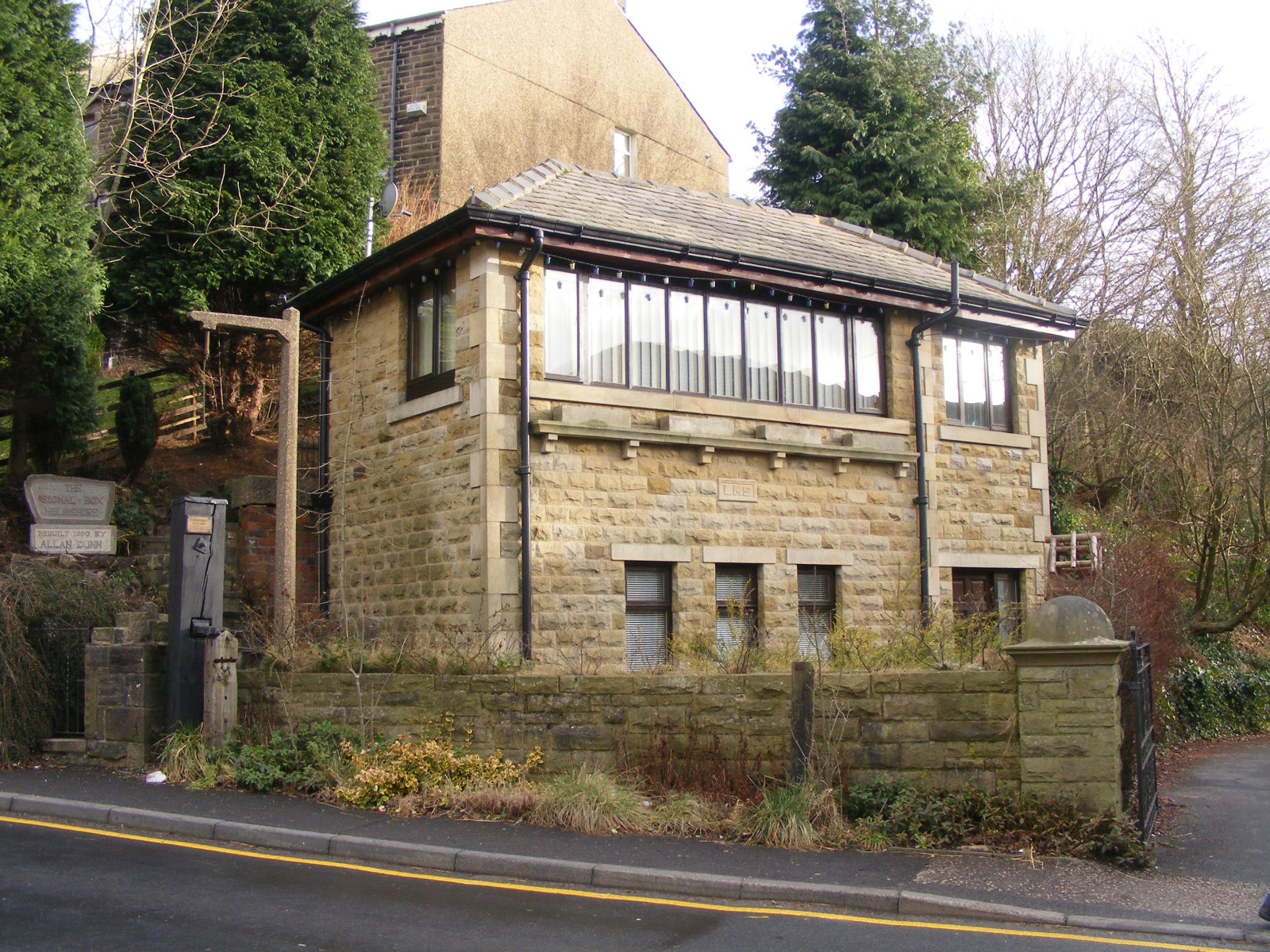
Helmshore Signal Box. Rebuilt as private housing by Alan Dunn in 1990

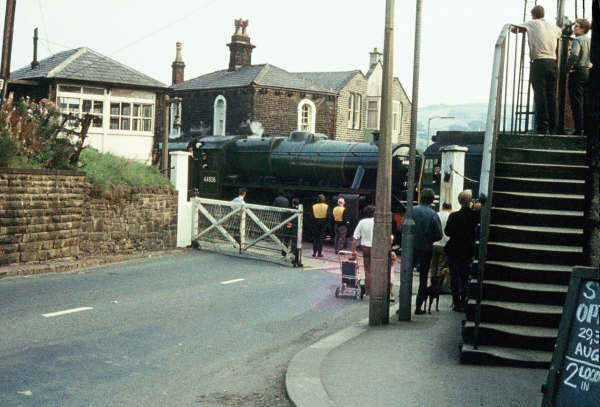
Helmshore railway station in 1970, looking west along Helmshore Road with the signal box (left)

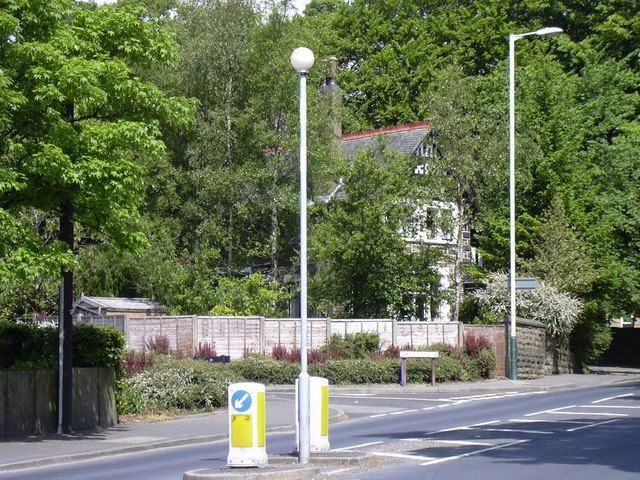
Helmshore Road

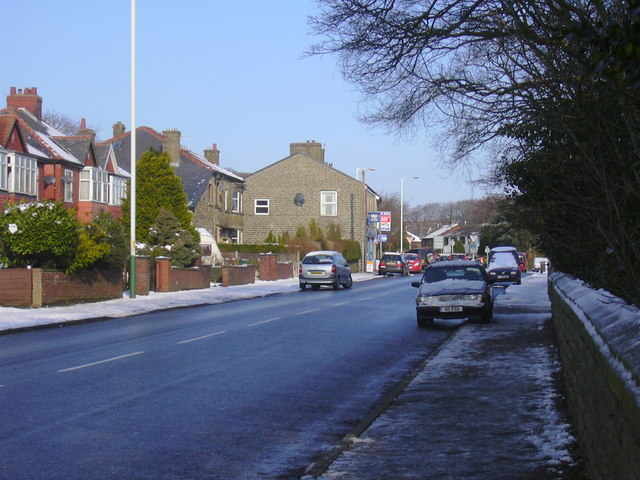
Helmshore Road

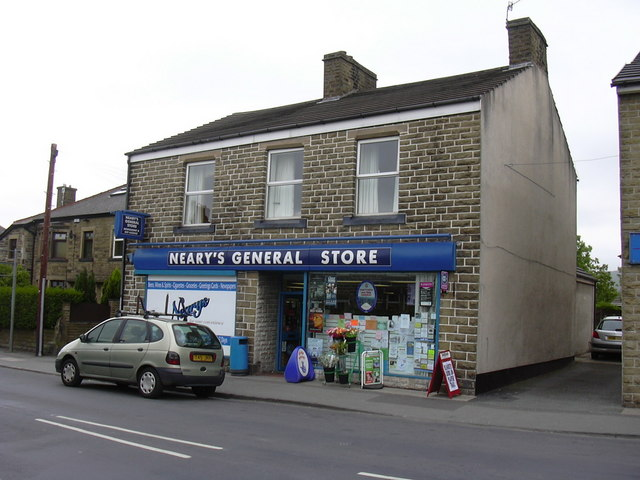
Helmshore Store

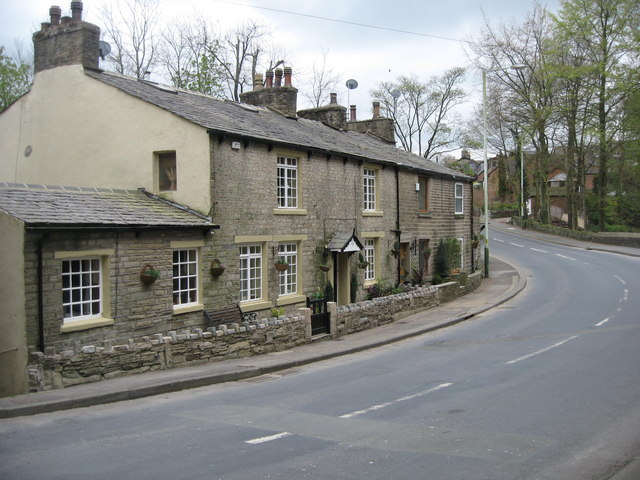
These cottages on the B6214 Helmshore Road were built in 1783

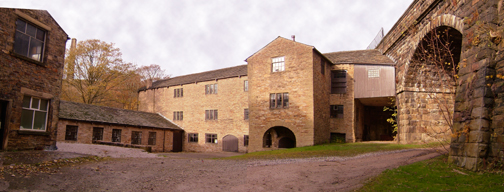
Helmshore Mill Museum

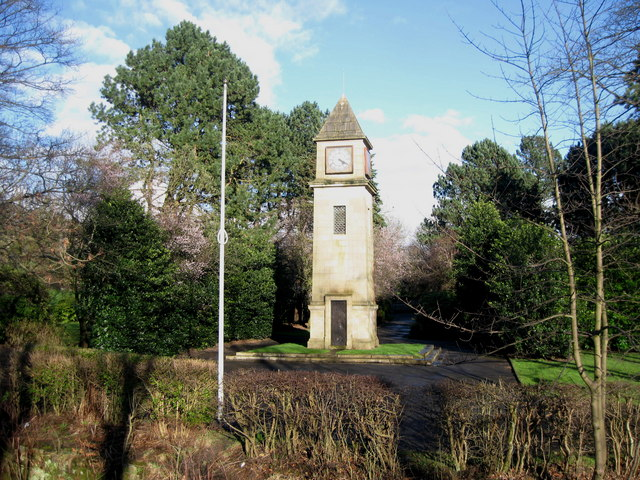
Memorial Gardens

== See also ==
- Listed buildings in Haslingden
