= River Ogden =

River in Lancashire, England

Coordinates: 53.67785°N 2.31636°W

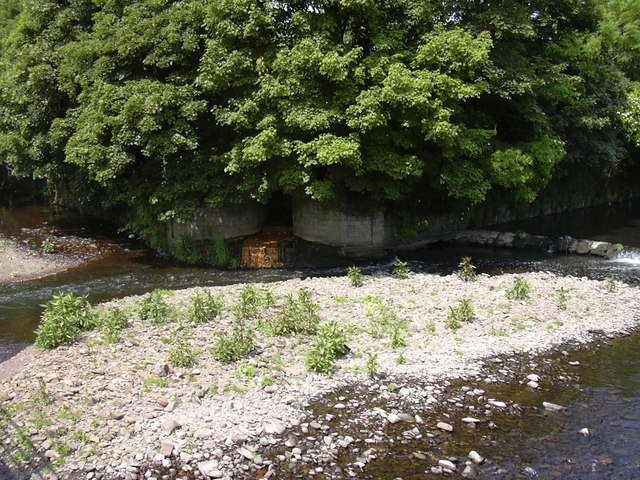
The confluence of the Rivers Ogden and Irwell at Irwell Vale

The River Ogden is a minor river in Lancashire, England. It is approximately 4.4 miles (7.1 km) long and has a catchment area of 9.77 square miles (25.298 km^{2}). (Note: Measured using mapping website.)

Beginning on the moors of Haslingden Grane as Ogden Brook, it heads east, feeding Ogden and Calf Hey Reservoirs. It then passes through the Holden Wood Reservoir and collects Swinnel Brook in an area historically known as the Trippet of Ogden, becoming the River Ogden. Turning to the south, it passes through the Helmshore part of Haslingden where it is met by Musbury Brook and then Alden Brook, overlooked by Musbury Tor. Heading southeast it joins the River Irwell at Irwell Vale, between Rawtenstall and Ramsbottom near grid reference SD792202.

== Tributaries ==
- Alden Brook
- Musbury Brook
  - Hare Brook
  - Long Grain Water
- Swinnel Brook
  - Sunny Field Brook ?
  - Duckworth Brook
  - Sherfin Brook
- Deep Brook
- Hog Lowe Brook

Next confluence upstream	River Irwell	Next confluence downstream
Limy Water (North)	River Ogden	Woodhill / Kirklees Brook (West)
