= John McQuade (footballer) =

Scottish footballer

Personal information
- Full name: John McQuade
- Date of birth: 8 July 1970 (age 56)
- Place of birth: Glasgow, Scotland
- Height: 5 ft 8 in (1.73 m)
- Position: Midfielder

Senior career*
Years	Team	Apps	(Gls)
1987–1993	Dumbarton	165	(50)
1993–1998	Hamilton Academical	82	(3)
1998–1999	Port Vale	3	(0)
1999	Raith Rovers	6	(1)
1999–2000	Stirling Albion	34	(15)
2000–2002	Ross County	21	(1)
2002	Peterhead	4	(0)
Total		335	(69)
- * Club domestic league appearances and goals

John McQuade (born 8 July 1970) is a Scottish former footballer. A midfielder, he scored 69 goals in 335 league games in a 15-year professional career in the Scottish and English leagues. His daughter, Jasmine McQuade, is also a footballer.

He began his career with Dumbarton in 1987, helping the club to the Second Division title in 1991–92, before winning a £80,000 move to Hamilton Academical in 1993. He helped the "Accies" to win promotion out of the Second Division in 1996–97. In June 1998, he was signed by the English club Port Vale before he returned to Scotland in April 1999 to sign with Raith Rovers. He moved on to Ross County in July 2000 before switching to Peterhead for one month in January 2002.

== Career ==
McQuade started his career with Dumbarton in 1987, just before the Boghead Park club suffered relegation out of the First Division in 1987–88 under the stewardship of Mark Clougherty and Bertie Auld. They fell down to 12th in 1988–89, with only Berwick Rangers and Stenhousemuir finishing lower in the Scottish Football League. The "Sons" rose to sixth in 1989–90 and seventh in 1990–91, before manager Billy Lamont led them to the Second Division title in 1991–92. They retained their second-tier status with a ninth-place finish in 1992–93.

McQuade was bought by Hamilton Academical manager Iain Munro for a fee of £80,000 in 1993. His new side finished fourth in the First Division in 1993–94 and sixth in 1994–95 before dropping out of the division with a ninth-place finish in 1995–96. The Douglas Park club bounced straight back under new boss Sandy Clark, securing promotion out of the Second Division with the runners-up spot in 1996–97, a whole ten points clear of third-placed Livingston. The "Accies" finished eighth in 1997–98, just two points ahead of relegated Partick Thistle; he made 30 appearances throughout the campaign.

He was signed by John Rudge at English First Division club Port Vale in June 1998. He made just three substitute appearances in the 1998–99 season. He departed Vale Park after new manager Brian Horton rejected the opportunity to extend his contract.

He joined Raith Rovers on a free transfer in April 1999 and made six appearances before the end of the season. After just a four-month stay at Stark's Park, he moved on to Stirling Albion. John Philliben's "Binos" finished seventh in the Second Division in 1999–2000; during the campaign, McQuade scored a total of 16 goals in 41 games. He then left Forthbank Stadium and joined Ross County in July 2000. Neale Cooper's "Staggies" finished sixth in the First Division in 2000–01, as McQuade played 25 games. Having fallen out of the first-team at Victoria Park, he moved on to Ian Wilson's Third Division side Peterhead in January 2002, before leaving Balmoor the following month.

== Personal life ==
McQuade married Melanie. Their daughter, Jasmine, is a professional footballer.

== Career statistics ==
Appearances and goals by club, season and competition
Club	Season	League			National cup (Note: Includes FA Cup, Scottish Cup)		League cup (Note: Includes Football League Cup, Scottish League Cup, Scottish Challenge Cup)		Total	
Club	Season	Division	Apps	Goals	Apps	Goals	Apps	Goals	Apps	Goals
Hamilton Academical	1997–98	Scottish First Division	26	3	1	0	3	0	30	3
Port Vale	1998–99	First Division	3	0	—		1	0	4	0
Raith Rovers	1998–99	Scottish First Division	6	1	0	0	0	0	6	1
Stirling Albion	1999–2000	Scottish Second Division	34	15	2	0	6	1	41	16
Ross County	2000–01	Scottish First Division	24	1	0	0	1	0	25	1
Ross County	2001–02	Scottish First Division	6	0	0	0	3	1	9	1
Ross County	Total		30	1	0	0	4	1	34	2
Peterhead	2001–02	Scottish Third Division	4	0	0	0	0	0	4	0

== Honours ==
Dumbarton

- Scottish Football League Second Division: 1991–92

Hamilton Academical

- Scottish Football League Second Division second-place promotion: 1996–97
