= Craig Moore =

Australian soccer player (born 1975)

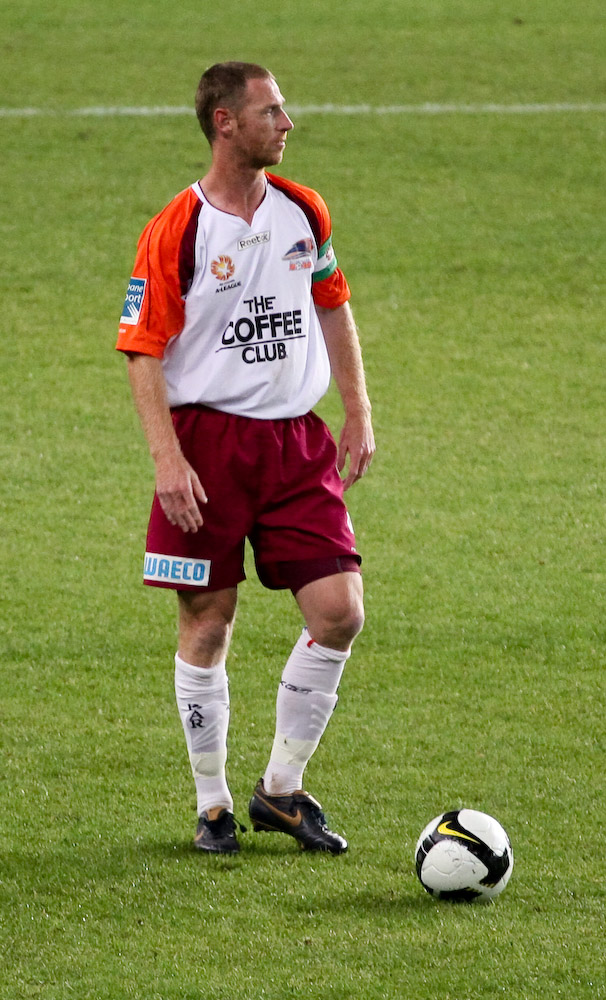
- Moore in 2008 playing for Queensland Roar

Personal information
- Full name: Craig Andrew Moore
- Date of birth: 12 December 1975 (age 50)
- Place of birth: Sydney, Australia
- Height: 1.85 m (6 ft 1 in)
- Position: Centre-back

Youth career
- 1991: North Star
- 1992–1993: AIS
- 1993–1994: Rangers

Senior career*
Years	Team	Apps	(Gls)
1994–1998	Rangers	74	(5)
1998–1999	Crystal Palace	23	(3)
1999–2005	Rangers	100	(9)
2005	Borussia Mönchengladbach	13	(1)
2005–2007	Newcastle United	25	(0)
2007–2009	Brisbane Roar	57	(3)
2010	Kavala	11	(1)
2010	Brisbane Strikers	0	(0)
2011	Werribee City		
Total		303	(22)

International career
1991	Australia U17	8	(0)
1992–1993	Australia U20	24	(0)
1996–1998	Australia U23	8	(1)
2004	Australia Olympic (O.P.)	3	(0)
1995–2010	Australia	52	(3)
Medal record
Representing Australia
Men's Association football
FIFA Confederations Cup
Bronze medal – third place	2001 Yokohama
OFC U-23 Championship
Winner	1996 Adelaide
OFC U-17 Championship
Winner	1991 Napier
- * Club domestic league appearances and goals

Craig Andrew Moore (born 12 December 1975) is an Australian former professional soccer player who played as a centre-back. His 2006 FIFA World Cup profile describes him as being "tough-tackling and uncompromising but also calm and composed under pressure."

Moore is best known for his two spells with Scottish Premier Division / Scottish Premier League club Rangers. Having graduated through their youth system, Moore made 252 appearances for the Glasgow based club from 1993 to 2005, punctuated with a season in England with Crystal Palace in the 1998–99 First Division. In his time at Rangers, he became team captain and won numerous domestic league and cup honours, including making 44 appearances and scoring four goals in their 2002–03 Treble-winning season. Moore became an important player at the centre of Rangers defence up until 2004 over two spells.

After leaving Rangers on a free transfer in January 2005, Moore spent a half-season at German Bundesliga club Borussia Mönchengladbach, before moving to English Premier League club Newcastle United. Released by Newcastle after an injury hit two seasons, Moore returned to Australia signing with Queensland Roar (later renamed Brisbane Roar) in the Australian A-League, as their captain and Marquee player. After three seasons with the Roar, in January 2010 Moore moved to Greek Super League side Kavala, only to leave in March.

In international football, Moore has made over 50 appearances for the Australia national team, including at the 2006 and 2010 World Cups in Germany and South Africa. Having made his debut in 1995, he has been Australia national team captain a number of times.

== Early life ==
Moore was born in Canterbury, New South Wales and raised in Doonside, New South Wales. He played junior football with Brisbane club North Star after his family relocated north when he was thirteen, before a scholarship with the Australian Institute of Sport. While progressing through the Australian Institute of Sport, Moore was friends with Mark Viduka, having known each other since they were teenagers.

While making his way to become a professional footballer, Moore was taught and mentored by Eddie Thomson and was responsible for helping him play in the centre–back position, a position he played throughout his whole career. Manager Walter Smith agreed on playing Moore in the centre–back position, saying: "Centre half is his natural position, although I have used him mostly at full back and in midfield. He is mobile and clever, although his aggressive style of play tends to earn him more bookings than any of us would wish."

== Club career ==
=== Rangers (first spell) ===
Moore joined Rangers youth system from the Australian Institute of Sport in 1993 and was assigned to the development squad for a year. He made his Rangers debut, starting the whole game in a 0–0 draw against Dundee United on 5 April 1994. Local newspaper The Herald said: "Most of the Rangers supporters among the 11,048 crowd were unaware of the existence of Moore."

Moore was included in the first team by manager Walter Smith in the 1994–95 season and successfully dispatched a right–back position from Gary Stevens, who left the club. He provided two goals, including one for Duncan Ferguson, who scored a hat–trick, in a 6–1 win against Arbroath on 17 August 1994. Moore then scored his first goal for Rangers, in a 2–2 draw against Aberdeen on 24 September 1994. However, he was sent–off on two occasions by the end of the year, coming against Motherwell on 22 October 1994 and Hearts on 9 November 1994 that saw him served a combination of three matches. Moore’s contributions at the club saw Rangers win the league for the seventh-consecutive time, as well as, the Glasgow Cup. After scoring an own goal in a 3–0 loss against rivals, Celtic on 8 May 1996, he scored on a last game of the season, in a 1–1 draw against Partick Thistle. Despite facing being sidelined due to the league’s three-foreigner rule and injuries in the 1994–95 season, Moore finished his first full season at the club, making twenty–five appearances and scoring two times in all competitions.

At the start of the 1995–96 season, Moore continued to make himself available in the first team under the management of Walter Smith. He scored the only goal of the game, in a 1–0 win against Aberdeen on 7 October 1995. Despite losing 4–1 against Juventus on 18 October 1995, Moore’s performance was praised, having stepped in the starting line–up for the suspended Alan McLaren. During a 4–1 win against Hearts on 21 October 1995, he was elbowed in the face by Alan Lawrence in an off-the-ball incident but was not noticed by the referee. After the incident, Lawrence was eventually suspended for one match and the linesman, who did not see the incident, was demoted by the Scottish Football Association. By March, Moore made history by becoming the first victim of an on-field offence to give evidence to the SFA disciplinary committee. During a 1–1 draw against Celtic on 17 March 1996, he suffered a foot injury and had to be substituted after just 34 minutes. After the match, it was announced that Moore was out for the rest of the 1995–96 season. However, his season was already marred by injuries and international commitment with Australia, resulting in him making sixteen appearances and scoring once in all competitions. Despite this, his contributions at the club saw Rangers win the league for the eighth-consecutive time and the Scottish Cup.

The start of the 1996–97 season saw Moore continue to recover from a foot injury. On 18 September 1996, he made his return from a foot injury, starting a match and played 67 minutes before being substituted, in a 4–0 win against Hibernian in the quarter–finals of the Scottish League Cup. Since returning from injury, he regained his first team place and began rotating in playing either the centre–back position and midfield position. Moore started in the Scottish League Cup final against Hearts and helped Rangers win 4–3 to win the final. After suffering a hamstring injury during a 3–1 win against Dunfermline Athletic on 14 December 1996, he returned to the starting line–up and played 75 minutes before being substituted, in a 3–1 win against Celtic on 2 January 1997. After being sidelined throughout February, Moore scored his first goal of the season, in a 2–2 draw against Aberdeen on 1 March 1997. Despite an injury during a 2–0 loss against Motherwell on 5 May 1997, he recovered and helped the club win the league for the ninth-consecutive time. At the end of the 1996–97 season, Moore went on to make thirty–one appearances and scoring once in all competitions.

Ahead of the start of the 1997–98 season, Moore spent the pre–season, recovering from his rib injury. He continued to make himself available in the first team under the management of Walter Smith. However, Moore suffered an injury that saw sidelined for a month. On 31 January 1998, he made his return to the starting line–up and played the whole game, in a 2–0 loss against St Johnstone. In the last game of the season against Hearts, Moore received a straight red card in the 82nd minute for a tackle on Neil McCann, in a 3–1 win. At the end of the 1997–98 season, he made seventeen appearances in all competitions.

In the 1998–99 season, Moore was featured in Rangers’ first team for the first eight league matches of the season. By the time he left the club in September, Moore made nine appearances in all competitions.

=== Crystal Palace ===
On 29 September 1998, Moore joined Crystal Palace for a transfer fee of £750, 000. Upon joining the club, he was reunited with former Socceroos manager Terry Venables.

Moore made his Crystal Palace debut, starting the whole game, in a 5–1 win against Norwich City on 17 October 1998. In a follow–up match, he scored his first goal for the club, in a 3–2 win against Wolverhampton Wanderers. However, Moore was sent–off in the 49th minute for a second bookable offence, in a 2–0 loss against Grimsby Town on 31 October 1998. Despite this, he scored two goals in the next two matches against West Bromwich Albion and Portsmouth. However, Moore suffered an injury when Crystal Palace lost 4–0 against Huddersfield Town. Following this, he returned and spent most of the 1998–99 season at Crystal Palace, helping the club fought relegation and was regarded as a success in London despite facing administration by March. By the time Moore left Crystal Palace, he made twenty–four appearances and scoring three times in all competitions.

=== Rangers (second spell) ===
On 31 March 1999, Moore returned to Rangers after the South London club defaulted on transfer payments. Prior to the move, he was linked with a move to Birmingham City and Leeds United, but the wage issues prevented his move to Birmingham City. Moore scored on his return, in a 3–1 loss against St. Johnstone on 4 April 1999. However, his return was short–lived when he suffered a knee injury after colliding a teammate and was out for the rest of the 1998–99 season. With his return to Rangers, Moore went on to make twelve appearances and scoring once in all competitions.

Ahead of the 1999–00 season, Moore recovered from his injury and was featured in a number of friendly matches for Rangers. He helped the club qualify for the UEFA Champions League group stage by beating FC Haka and Parma. Moore continued to regain his first team place under the management of Dick Advocaat, forming a partnership with Lorenzo Amoruso. On 15 September 1999, he scored an own goal, in a 2–0 loss against Valencia in the UEFA Champions League group stage. A month later on 26 October 1999, Moore scored his first goal of the season in the club’s return leg against Valencia, losing 2–1. His performance was praised by manager Advocaat, who believed to be "the only Rangers player who performed anywhere close to personal equilibrium" and justified his action on choosing him over Colin Hendry. He scored his second goal of the season, in a 5–0 win against Aberdeen on 22 January 2000. A month later on 19 February 2000, Moore scored his third goal of the season, in a 1–0 win against Greenock Morton. However, he suffered a knee injury that saw him out for two months. Prior to this, Moore faced injury and suspension setbacks halfway through the 1999–00 season. While on the sidelines, he was nominated for the PFA Scotland Players' Player of the Year, but lost out to Viduka. But Moore made his return to the starting line–up in the Scottish Cup final against Aberdeen and played 71 minutes before being substituted, in a 4–0 win to add a double. At the end of the 1999–00 season, he went on to make thirty–nine appearances and scoring three times in all competitions.

Ahead of the 2000–01 season, Moore was emerged as the favourite to take over the captain armband at Rangers after the injuries of Amoruso and Arthur Numan, as well as, the first choice centre–back with Bert Konterman. He captained his first match for the club against Žalgiris Kaunas in the second round qualifier of the UEFA Champions League, in a 4–1 win on 26 July 2000. However, Moore suffered a knee injury once again and was eventually sidelined for seven months. Due to his injury, this was considered "as a contributory factor" to Rangers’ struggles throughout the 2000–01 season. He spent months at training in order to regain his fitness while recovering from a knee injury. Moore made his first appearances for the club in seven months, playing in the right–back and setting up a goal for Tore André Flo, who scored twice, in a 2–0 win on 3 March 2001. However, his return was short–lived when he was sent–off for a second bookable offence, in a 2–0 loss against Dundee on 14 March 2001. After not playing for a month due to his international commitment, Moore returned to the starting line–up against Celtic on 29 April 2001 and played the whole game, in a 3–0 loss. At the end of the 2000–01 season, he made six appearances in all competitions.

Ahead of the 2001–02 season, Moore began a contract negotiation with Rangers, while also maintaining his fitness in hopes of regaining his first team place. He started in the club’s first five matches of the season, including a victories against NK Maribor in the second round of the UEFA Champions League qualifier that send Rangers through to the next round. After not playing for a month, he made his return to the starting line–up and helped the club keep a clean sheet, in a 3–0 win against Motherwell on 16 September 2001. Moore regained his first team place, reuniting with his centre–back partner, Amoruso despite facing injuries and international commitment along the way. However, he received a red card for a second bookable offence, in a 2–2 draw against Motherwell on 15 December 2001. After serving a one match suspension, Moore made amends for his return when he scored a header, in a 3–0 win against Hibernian on 26 December 2001. On 2 February 2002, Moore scored his second goal of the season with another header, which turned out to be a winning goal, in a 2–1 win against Dundee. However, his joy was short–lived when he suffered a hamstring injury after colliding with Stefan Klos and was substituted at half time, in a 2–1 win against Celtic in the semi–final of the Scottish Cup. After the match, Moore was eventually sidelined for two months. On 27 April 2002, he made return from injury, starting the whole game, in a 2–0 win against Aberdeen. Moore started in the Scottish Cup final against Celtic and helped Rangers win 3–2. On 12 May 2002, he scored his third goal of the season, in a 1–1 draw against Dunfermline Athletic. At the end of the 2001–02 season, Moore went on to make twenty–nine appearances and scoring three times in all competitions.

In the 2002–03 season, Moore regained his first team place at Rangers, reuniting with his centre–back partner, Amoruso once again. He helped the club’s defence keep six consecutive clean sheets in the league between 25 August 2002 and 28 September 2002. However during that time, Moore found himself in an injury on two occasions in the first two months in the season, but managed to recovery quickly. He then scored two goals in two matches between 27 October 2002 and 2 November 2002 against Kilmarnock and Dundee. Moore started every match in the 2002–03 season until he suffered an injury that saw him miss two matches. Moore then returned to the starting line–up against Dunfermline Athletic on 23 November 2002 and helped Rangers win 3–2. Two weeks later on 7 December 2002, he scored his third goal of the season, in another 3–2 win against rivals, Celtic. Moore scored his fourth goal of the season, in a 3–0 win against Arbroath in a third round of the Scottish Cup on 25 January 2003. He played a significant role in the Scottish League Cup final against rivals, Celtic by setting up the club’s second goal of the game for Peter Løvenkrands, in a 2–1 win to win the tournament. In the last game of the season, Moore helped Rangers win the league after beating Dunfermline Athletic 6–1. Six days later on 31 May 2003, he helped the club win the Scottish Cup final by beating Dundee 1–0, achieving a domestic treble. Reviewing his performance, The Herald said: "Moore often an unsung hero but he was sorely missed in defence when he was out injured. A consistent and powerful defender, he always tries to do the simple things well." At the end of the 2002–03 season, Moore went on to make forty–four appearances and scoring four times in all competitions.

Ahead of the 2003–04 season, Moore was expecting to make himself available in the first team under the management of Alex McLeish and also appointed as a new captain following the departure of Barry Ferguson. However, he suffered a hamstring injury during a 1–1 draw against Copenhagen in the first leg of the UEFA Champions League third round, and was sidelined for a month. On 27 September 2003, Moore made his return from injury, coming on as a second half substitute, in a 3–1 win against Dundee. He captained his first match for Rangers against Panathinaikos in the UEFA Champions League match and helped the club draw 1–1. However, Moore, once again, suffered another hamstring injury and was substituted in the 68th minute; in a 3–0 loss against Manchester United on 5 November 2003. On 28 December 2003, he made his return from injury, coming on as a second half substitute, in a 3–1 win against Dundee. Having been suspended twice in the beginning of 2004, Moore then scored his first goal of the season, in a 2–0 win against Kilmarnock on 11 February 2004. His second goal of the season then came on 13 March 2004, in a 1–1 draw against Hearts. However, he suffered a knee injury that saw him sidelined for the rest of the 2003–04 season. Despite this, Moore went on to make twenty–five appearances and scoring two times in all competitions.

Ahead of the 2004–05 season, Moore’s future at Rangers was in doubt after McLeish stated that he "may leave the club if the player’s ambition didn't match the manager" and still maintain that he need to fight for his first team place. This came after his contract negotiation have been stalled with the club, to the point that his relationship with McLeish to "have deteriorated, perhaps beyond repair". However, his involvement in the "Olyroos", the Australian Olympic Football team, angered Rangers manager McLeish as it forced him to miss the start of the Scottish league season, resulting in Moore being stripped of the club’s captaincy and was placed on a transfer list. Following, he was linked with a move away from Rangers in the summer transfer window, with Real Sociedad and Blackburn Rovers interested in signing Moore. His move to Blackburn Rovers collapsed after failing a medical. He ended up staying at the club and made his first appearance of the season, starting the whole game, in a 1–1 draw against CSKA Moscow in the UEFA Champions League play–offs that saw Rangers eliminated from the tournament. Following this, Moore was forced to the fringes of the team and never played for Rangers again. It was reported on 22 December 2004 that he’s expecting to leave the club, with Everton and Borussia Mönchengladbach interested in signing him. By the time Moore left Rangers, he made six appearances in all competitions in the 2004–05 season.

Moore won twelve major honours with Rangers including five league championships and a domestic treble in 2003.

=== Borussia Mönchengladbach ===
Moore was given a free transfer and joined Borussia Mönchengladbach on 3 January 2005, where he teamed up with former Rangers manager Dick Advocaat.

Moore made an impact on debut for the club when he scored a header, in a 1–0 win against Arminia Bielefeld on 21 January 2005. Since joining Borussia Mönchengladbach, Moore became a first team regular, playing in the centre–back position. However, he received a red card for a second bookable offence, in a 2–1 loss against Bayern Munich on 9 April 2005. When Advocaat was sacked after a short time in charge, Moore left the German club after falling out with the club management. By the time he left Borussia Mönchengladbach, Moore made thirteen appearances and scoring once in all competitions.

Shortly after his sacking, it was emerged that the club sacked him after he attended training drunk, a claimed that was denied by Moore. This also led Moore to take legal action against Borussia Mönchengladbach.

=== Newcastle United ===
On 30 July 2005, Moore signed a two-year deal at Newcastle United to play for the first time in the Premier League.

Moore made his competitive Newcastle United debut on 22 March 2006 against Chelsea in the FA Cup quarter-final, becoming the second Australian to play for the Magpies after Dave Mitchell who had a loan spell at St James' Park in the 1990–91 season. Moore's actual first game came at home to Yeading in which he scored one of five goals. Following this, he started in the remaining matches of the 2005–06 season, playing in the centre–back position. However, Injuries ruined Moore's Newcastle career, and he only made eight premiership appearances in the 2005–06 season. Due to injuries when Moore started out at the club, newspaper The Northern Echo branded him as the 'Invisible Man'.

Ahead of the 2006–07season, Moore was placed on a transfer list by manager Glenn Roeder and was linked with a move to A-League club, but the move did not happen. He’s also stated about regaining his fitness in order to win his first team place at Newcastle United. Since the start of the 2006–07 season, Moore became a first team regular, forming a centre–back partnership with Titus Bramble. He then captained his first match at Newcastle United, helping the club win 1–0 against Palermo in the UEFA Cup match on 2 November 2006. However, Moore was then injured with a torn hamstring in November 2006 and was ruled out for several months. He previously suffered a knee injury earlier in the 2006–07 season, but recovered quickly. Moore returned but he struggled to get back into the team, with Peter Ramage, Steven Taylor, and Bramble keeping him out. After Bramble's dip in form, Moore returned to the first team, appearing four times. However, his return was short–lived when he suffered another injury that eventually saw him sidelined for the rest of the 2006–07 season. Moore made 17 premiership appearances in the 2006–07 season.

On 16 May 2007, it was announced that Moore's contract would not be renewed, and he was released by the club. He made 31 appearances for Newcastle.

=== Brisbane Roar ===
It was rumoured on 25 July 2007 that Moore had signed with Queensland Roar (now Brisbane Roar), to become the Roar's Marquee signing for the 2007–08 Hyundai A-League Season and the 2008–2009 season. This was confirmed with an announcement by Queensland and Moore on 25 July 2007 with Moore signing to be Queensland's marquee player for two years. Upon joining the club, he was given a captain ahead of the new season.

Moore's career with the Queensland Roar did not start well when he was sent off in the 69th minute in the first game of the season against Adelaide United for a second yellow card. Although Queensland Roar were trailing 2–1 at the time, they came back to level the score at 2–2 and hold on for a draw. After serving a one match suspension, Moore made his return to the starting line–up for the club, in a 1–0 loss against Central Coast Mariners on 6 September 2007. He helped Queensland Roar finish fourth place in the league to qualify for the Final series. However, the club lost in the Preliminary Final, in a 3–2 defeat against Newcastle Jets after extra time. At the end of the 2007–08 season, Moore went on to make twenty–one appearances in all competitions. For his performance, he was awarded the Gary Wilkins Medal (Player of the Year).

After missing the start of the 2008–09 season due to injury, Moore scored his first goal for the Queensland Roar in their 2008–09 season round four clash with Perth Glory, as the club went on to win 3–0. However, his season was interrupted after being diagnosed with testicular cancer. In his first match since the announcement, he started the whole game against Perth Glory on 22 November 2008 and helped Queensland Roar win 4–1. After being given all clear, he then scored his second goal of the season, in a 2–1 win against Melbourne Victory on 2 January 2009. Moore helped the club finish third place to qualify for the Final series once again. However, Queensland Roar lost in the Preliminary Final, in a 1–0 defeat against Adelaide United. At the end of the 2008–09 season, he made twenty–three appearances and scoring two times in all competitions. For his performance, Moore won both the Gary Wilkins Medal (Player of the Year) and Member's Player of the Year.

At the start of the 2009–10 season, Moore scored his first goal of the season, in a 1–0 win against Central Coast Mariners. He began to regain his first team place for the club, playing in the centre–back position until his departure. Moore left the Roar in December 2009, after falling out with the coach Ange Postecoglou and wanting a move to Europe to increase his chances of 2010 FIFA World Cup selection. Following his release, a European club was keen to sign Moore, which turns out to be Scottish Premier League side St Johnstone, where he could rejoin his former teammate Derek McInnes.

Despite leaving Brisbane Roar on bad terms, Moore’s time at the club was remembered fondly by players and the club, who even selected him in Brisbane Roar Ultimate Eleven.

=== Kavala ===
In January 2010, he moved to Greek side Kavala on an eighteen-month contract. He debuted for Kavala on 10 January 2010 in a 1–0 loss against Asteras Tripolis.

It was reported on 31 March 2010 that his contract with Kavala had been terminated after an off-field incident. Moore later denied there had been an off-field incident, stating he had left over fears that he could experience burnout or serious injury, endangering his 2010 World Cup place, had he stayed at the Greek side, having played 15 games in all, 13 of those in just five weeks, on top of his games at the Roar earlier in the season.

=== Later career ===
Moore signed for Queensland State League club Brisbane Strikers to maintain match fitness ahead of the 2010 World Cup, but Football Federation Australia requested his attendance in Socceroos camp just before he was set to make his Strikers debut.

Moore put on the red jersey of Sydney United in a farewell testimonial for former Socceroos and AC Milan goalkeeper Zeljko Kalac in July 2010 against Newcastle Jets. The game ended in a 2–0 win for Newcastle Jets.

Moore spent the 2011 season, playing for Werribee City before quietly announcing his retirement from professional football.

== Post-Playing career ==
Following his retirement from professional football, Moore was appointed as advisor by the Football Australia in May 2013. A year later, he was appointed as a football adviser and team ambassador for Australia's World Cup campaign. On 23 June 2015, Moore re–joined Brisbane Roars as the club’s Football Operations Manager. Under his role, he contributed to making new signings for the club, including Tommy Oar, who he mentored.

After losing 2–1 against Adelaide United on 19 March 2017, Moore and Brisbane Roar’s assistant manager Ross Aloisi were in an altercation with Adelaide United’s assistant manager Jacobo Ramallo. Three days later on 23 March 2017, both Moore and Aloisi received a punishment for their misconduct. However on 16 January 2018, Moore left Brisbane Roar.

Moore then pursued a new career by becoming a football agent.

== International career ==
Having represented the Socceroos levels, Moore made his debut for the Australia national team and started the whole game, in a 1–0 win against Ghana on 21 June 1995. He played in both legs of the FIFA World Cup qualification against Iran, as the Socceroos failed to qualify for the FIFA World Cup after drawing 3–3 on aggregate through away goal.

On 23 February 2000, Moore made his first appearances for Socceroos in three years and scored his first goal for the national team, as well as, setting up the first goal of the game, in a 3–0 win against Hungary. A year later on 28 March 2001, he and his then Rangers teammate, Tony Vidmar were called up to the Socceroos squad for the World Cup qualifying matches. The decision to call-up both players angered manager Advocaat before and during Australia’s World Cup qualifying matches. Moore played all four matches for the national team, including a 22–0 win against Tonga and a 31–0 win against American Samoa. A month later, he was called up to the Socceroos squad for the FIFA Confederations Cup. Moore played three matches in the tournament until he was sent–off for a second bookable offence, in a 1–0 loss against Japan in the semi–finals of the FIFA Confederations Cup. He, once again, played in both legs of the FIFA World Cup qualification against Uruguay, as the Socceroos failed to qualify for the FIFA World Cup after losing 3–1 on aggregate.

Following this, Moore did not get a Socceroos call–up until 30 January 2003 for the match against England, starting the whole game, in a 3–1 win on 12 February 2003. He didn’t receive another call up from the national team until on 28 January 2004 and captained the Socceroos for the first time, in a 1–1 draw against Venezuela on 18 February 2004.

Moore was called up to the "Olyroos" squad, the Australian Olympic Football team at the 2004 Olympics at Athens, Greece and was named the captain for the tournament. With his leadership, he helped the Aussie Olympic team to advance to the quarter–finals after finishing second place in the group stage. In the quarter–finals, the "Olyroos" was eliminated after losing 1–0 against Iraq.

A year later, Moore was called up to the national team squad for the FIFA Confederations Cup. Around this time, he was planning to retire from playing international football. Moore played all three matches for the Socceroos, as the national team were eliminated in the group stage.

In May 2006, Moore represented the Socceroos in the FIFA World Cup, which was the first time since 1974 that the national team last played in the tournament. Prior to the start of the tournament, he said: "You look at our squad, there's going to be competition for all places. That's a good thing, a nice headache for the manager, but I'm confident if I'm fit that I can get back into the team." Moore made his World Cup debut, forming a centre–back partnership with Lucas Neill and Scott Chipperfield, and played 61 minutes before being substituted, in a 3–1 win against Japan. He then scored a penalty kick against Croatia in the 39th minute of the game, in a 2–2 draw enabling Australia to progress to the round of 16. However, Moore started the whole game, as Socceroos lost 1–0 against Italy in the knockout stage and saw Australia eliminated from the tournament.

Following the World Cup, Moore spoke about on choosing to represent club over country should he received a call–up. However, he was in a row with Football Federation Australia after arriving late for the Socceroos’ assembly in Brisbane in time for training and other commitments, therefore breaching the National Team Players Agreement and Code of Conduct. This led manager Graham Arnold to suspend him. A month later on 14 November 2006, Moore’s suspension was lifted and played 45 minutes before being substituted, in a 1–1 draw against Ghana. He announced his international retirement on 6 February 2008 after Australia's 3–0 win over Qatar in their first FIFA World Cup Qualifier at Telstra Dome.

In September that year, Moore announced his return to come out of retirement for the Socceroos’ International call ups. On 1 October 2008, Australian coach Pim Verbeek announced that he was part of the 35-man squad for the upcoming World Cup Qualifiers. On 14 October 2008, Moore made his first appearance for the national team, coming against Qatar, the last team he played against, and helped Socceroos win 4–0. In May 2010, he represented the Socceroos in the FIFA World Cup in South Africa. Moore played two matches in the World Cup against Germany and Ghana. However like Harry Kewell, he was suspended for the next match against Serbia after picking up two yellow cards in the tournament and the national team were eliminated from the tournament despite winning the last game.

Moore retired from international football after the 2010 World Cup.

== Personal life ==
In November 2008, Moore was diagnosed with, and underwent surgery for, testicular cancer. Six weeks later, he was given the all-clear to resume his playing career, having caught it early. After being given the all-clear, Moore said that he undergoes tests every three to four months.

In January 2005, Moore was questioned by police on an accusation on racially abusing a taxi driver on New Year’s Day but he did not face charges after questioning. On 16 September 2010, Moore was arrested in Dubai after being in alterations with a taxi driver. After making a court appearance, he was fined for 1,000 dirhams (about $283) on Sunday for consuming alcohol.

Moore is married to his wife, Heather. Together, they have two children.

In December 2008, Moore was fined for lodging bets totalling $600 on two matches involving A-League teams with betting exchange Betfair. These matches did not include his own side, and because of this, it was deemed a fine was a satisfactory punishment, with the Roar labelling it as an "honest mistake". In response to the fine, he said: "That's been dealt with and it was an honest mistake. I put my hand up and I accepted the punishment, so for me, it's been dealt with and we move on."

== Career statistics ==
=== Club ===
Appearances and goals by club, season and competition
Club	Season	League			National cup (Note: Includes Scottish Cup, FA Cup, DFB-Pokal)		League cup (Note: Includes Scottish League Cup, Football League Cup)		Continental		Other		Total	
Club	Season	Division	Apps	Goals	Apps	Goals	Apps	Goals	Apps	Goals	Apps	Goals	Apps	Goals
Rangers	1993–94	Scottish Premier League	1	0										
Rangers	1994–95	Scottish Premier League	21	2	2	0	1	1	4	0			28	3
Rangers	1995–96	Scottish Premier League	11	1	1	0	1	0	2	0			15	1
Rangers	1996–97	Scottish Premier League	23	1	2	0	3	0	4	0			32	1
Rangers	1997–98	Scottish Premier League	10	0	1	0	2	0	2	1			15	1
Rangers	1998–99	Scottish Premier League	8	1	0	0	2	0	2	0	–		12	1
Rangers	Total		74	5	6	0	9	1	14	1	0	0	103	7
Crystal Palace	1998–99	First Division	23	3	1	0	0	0	–		–		24	3
Rangers	1999–2000	Scottish Premier League	22	1	4	1	1	0	12	1	–		39	3
Rangers	2000–01	Scottish Premier League	5	0	1	0	0	0	1	0	–		7	0
Rangers	2001–02	Scottish Premier League	18	3	2	0	2	0	7	0	–		29	3
Rangers	2002–03	Scottish Premier League	35	3	5	1	2	0	2	0	–		44	4
Rangers	2003–04	Scottish Premier League	17	2	2	0	2	0	4	0	–		25	2
Rangers	2004–05	Scottish Premier League	3	0	0	0	1	0	2	0	–		6	0
Rangers	Total		100	9	14	2	8	0	28	1	0	0	150	12
Borussia Mönchengladbach	2004–05	Bundesliga	13	1	0	0	–		–		–		13	1
Newcastle United	2005–06	Premier League	8	0	1	0	0	0	0	0	–		9	0
Newcastle United	2006–07	Premier League	17	0	0	0	1	0	4	0	–		22	0
Newcastle United	Total		25	0	1	0	1	0	4	0	0	0	31	0
Brisbane Roar (Note: "Queensland Roar" until 2009)	2007–08	A-League	18	0							3	0	21	0
Brisbane Roar	2008–09	A-League	20	2							3	0	23	2
Brisbane Roar	2009–10	A-League	19	1									19	1
Brisbane Roar	Total		57	3							6	0	63	3
Kavala	2009–10	Super League Greece	11	1	2	0	–		–		–		13	1
Career total			303	22	24	2	18	1	46	2	6	0	397	27

=== International ===
Appearances and goals by national team and year
National team	Year	Apps	Goals
Australia	1995	1	0
Australia	1996	1	0
Australia	1997	6	0
Australia	1998	0	0
Australia	1999	0	0
Australia	2000	1	1
Australia	2001	11	1
Australia	2002	0	0
Australia	2003	1	0
Australia	2004	2	0
Australia	2005	7	0
Australia	2006	8	1
Australia	2007	0	0
Australia	2008	2	0
Australia	2009	6	0
Australia	2010	6	0
Total		52	3

Scores and results list Australia's goal tally first, score column indicates score after each Moore goal.

List of international goals scored by Craig Moore
No.	Date	Venue	Opponent	Score	Result	Competition
1	23 February 2000	Üllői úti Stadion, Budapest, Hungary	Hungary	3–0	3–0	Friendly
2	13 November 2001	Melbourne Cricket Ground, Melbourne, Australia	France	1–0	1–1	Friendly
3	22 June 2006	Gottlieb-Daimler-Stadion, Stuttgart, Germany	Croatia	1–1	2–2	2006 FIFA World Cup

== Honours ==
Rangers

- Scottish Professional Football League: 1994–95, 1995–96, 1996–97, 1998–99, 1999–2000, 2002–03
- Scottish Cup: 1995–96, 1999–2000, 2001–02, 2002–03
- Scottish League Cup: 1996–97, 2001–02, 2002–03

Newcastle United

- UEFA Intertoto Cup: 2006

Australia

- Queensland Roar Gary Wilkins Medal: 2007–08, 2008–09
- Football Federation Australia Hall of Fame: 2011
- FFA Team of the Decade: 2000–13
- FFA Team of the Century
