= Kenny Arthur =

Scottish footballer & coach (born 1978)

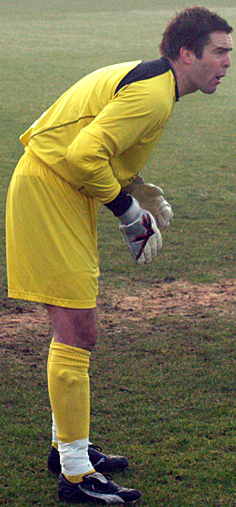
- Arthur playing for Accrington Stanley in 2008

Personal information
- Full name: Kenneth James Arthur
- Date of birth: 7 December 1978 (age 47)
- Place of birth: Bellshill, Scotland
- Position: Goalkeeper

Team information
- Current team: Partick Thistle (Goalkeeping Coach)

Youth career
- Partick Thistle

Senior career*
Years	Team	Apps	(Gls)
1996–2007	Partick Thistle	242	(0)
2007–2009	Accrington Stanley	66	(0)
2009–2010	Rochdale	15	(0)
2010–2012	Grimsby Town	28	(0)
2011–2012	→ Gainsborough Trinity (loan)	5	(0)
2012–2013	Airdrie United	18	(0)
2013–2014	Annan Athletic	33	(0)
2014–2015	Queen of the South	0	(0)
Total		407	(0)

International career
2003	Scotland B	1	(0)
- * Club domestic league appearances and goals

Kenneth James Arthur (born 7 December 1978) is a Scottish former professional footballer and is currently goalkeeping coach of Partick Thistle.

He played from 1996 to 2015 and represented Partick Thistle, Accrington Stanley, Rochdale, Grimsby Town, Gainsborough Trinity, Airdrie United and Annan Athletic. He also part owns the sporting brand Kaliaaer, which designs and manufactures goalkeeping equipment.

== Career ==
=== Partick Thistle ===
Arthur came through the youth ranks with Partick Thistle in 1996. During Partick Thistle's spell in the Scottish Premier League between 2002 and 2004, Arthur was recognised by the Scotland national team manager of the time Berti Vogts. He was in the squad for the home game against Iceland and for the away game in Lithuania.

In the 2003–04 season, Arthur found his first team place in danger, with the signing of Jákup Mikkelsen. Eventually, Arthur would retain his first team place, leading to Mikkelsen's departure In March 2004, Arthur was dropped from the Partick Thistle first team, when he was placed on the bench, against Aberdeen.

2006–07 was Arthur's testimonial year at Partick Thistle and it was marked by a golf day and a match at Firhill Stadium versus Celtic in which Thistle hero Chic Charnley equalised from 25 yards in the last minute. Arthur played more than 275 games for Partick Thistle. However, during the season, Arthur was more often second choice, behind Northern Irish goalkeeper Jonathan Tuffey. At the end of the season, Arthur was released by the club, ending an eleven-year stay.

Five years on, Arthur revealed he did not get to say goodbye to the club when he left.

=== Accrington Stanley ===
Arthur joined Accrington Stanley in 2007, where he remained for two years. On the opening game of the season, Arthur made his debut in a 1–0 win over Wycombe Wanderers. Having retained his first team place at Stanley, Arthur soon suffered a broken leg in a 3–0 win over Bradford City. After four months out, Arthur made his return in a 1–0 win over Rotherham United. After returning from injury, Arthur continued to keep his first team place and at the end of the season, signed a new one-year after the club exercised their option to extend his stay.

The next season, Arthur continued to keep his first team place until injuring his kidney in a match against Lincoln City after clashing with a Lincoln player and was expected to be out for four-six weeks. Arthur made his return in a 1–1 draw against Bradford on 17 January 2009. At the end of the season Arthur left the club, although this was at a time of financial difficulties for Accrington who were nearly wound up by HMRC for failing to pay tax bills which were reported to total over £300,000. At the time of his departure it was reported by local press that the financial problems the club were experiencing played a part in convincing Arthur that he had to leave. Accrington supporters were sorry to see Kenny go and many still regard him as one of the best goalkeepers that the club has ever had.

=== Rochdale ===
In 2009, he joined Rochdale, playing 15 times in the club's campaign which eventually saw them promoted to Football League One. In the first three-months of the season, Arthur was the first choice goalkeeper but soon lost his first team place to loan signing's Tom Heaton and Frank Fielding. At the end of the season, Arthur was placed on the transfer list.

=== Grimsby Town ===
Arthur signed a two-year deal with Grimsby Town on 8 June 2010 taking the number one spot from Nick Colgan. Grimsby who had suffered a goalkeeping crisis in both the past two seasons saw the new seasons preparations stall when Arthur injured his hamstring in the club's defeat against Rushden & Diamonds. Incidentally an injury to his understudy Colgan meant that goalkeeping coach Steve Croudson was called up to replace Arthur for at least one game before Sheffield Wednesday's Richard O'Donnell was signed. Arthur returned to action on 20 September, against Fleetwood Town only to injure his thumb in the warm up, meaning O'Donnell was forced to fill in once again.

Throughout his first year at the club, several injury problems meant he missed small chunks of the season. In the summer of 2011, Grimsby signed James McKeown as back-up keeper to Arthur but following the pre-season, McKeown became the favoured shot stopper at Blundell Park. On 3 November 2011, Arthur was loaned to Conference North side Gainsborough Trinity on an initial one-month loan, following injuries to Trinity's keepers Phil Barnes and Andrew Pettinger. After one month, his loan spell was extended once again. In January 2012, Arthur's loan spell at the club was ended and he returned to Grimsby Town.

In January 2012, Arthur was told he could leave Blundell Park if a Scottish club wanted to sign him on a free transfer. Arthur had his contract cancelled by mutual consent on 18 April 2012.

=== Airdrie United ===
Kenny Arthur signed for Airdrie United on 20 June 2012 on an initial one-year deal. On the opening game of the season, Arthur made his debut in a 4–1 win over Dumbarton and on 20 October 2012, Arthur conceded all of the goals in a 7–0 loss against his former club Partick Thistle. He left Airdrie United in May 2013.

=== Annan Athletic ===
In July 2013, Arthur signed for Annan Athletic and made his debut in the club's pre-season victory over Carlisle United. In July 2014, Arthur announced his retirement from football.

=== Queen of the South ===
Arthur joined Dumfries club Queen of the South as goalkeeping coach in the 2014/15 season. He was named as a substitute for the game at Livingston on 25 October 2014 when the reserve goalkeeper was injured and the age group goalkeepers were unavailable.

== Career statistics ==
Club	Season	Division	League		FA Cup		League Cup		Other		Total	
Club	Season	Division	Apps	Goals	Apps	Goals	Apps	Goals	Apps	Goals	Apps	Goals
Partick Thistle	1997–98	Scottish First Division	19	0	1	0	0	0	0	0	20	0
Partick Thistle	1998–99	Scottish Second Division	26	0	3	0	1	0	0	0	30	0
Partick Thistle	1999–2000	Scottish Second Division	4	0	0	0	1	0	0	0	5	0
Partick Thistle	2000–01	Scottish Second Division	34	0	2	0	0	0	0	0	36	0
Partick Thistle	2001–02	Scottish First Division	23	0	6	0	0	0	0	0	29	0
Partick Thistle	2002–03	Scottish Premier League	35	0	4	0	0	0	0	0	39	0
Partick Thistle	2003–04	Scottish Premier League	22	0	3	0	2	0	0	0	27	0
Partick Thistle	2004–05	Scottish First Division	34	0	2	0	2	0	2 (Note: Appearance(s) in Scottish Challenge Cup)	0	40	0
Partick Thistle	2005–06	Scottish Second Division	24	0	4	0	2	0	6 (Note: 2 appearance(s) in Scottish Challenge Cup) (Note: 4 appearance(s) in Scottish Second Division play-offs)	0	36	0
Partick Thistle	2006–07	Scottish First Division	21	0	2	0	2	0	1	0	26	0
Partick Thistle total			242	0	27	0	10	0	9	0	288	0
Accrington Stanley	2007–08	League Two	24	0	0	0	1	0	0	0	25	0
Accrington Stanley	2008–09	League Two	42	0	2	0	1	0	1 (Note: Appearance(s) in Football League Trophy)	0	46	0
Accrington Stanley total			66	0	2	0	2	0	1	0	71	0
Rochdale	2009–10	League Two	15	0	1	0	1	0	1	0	18	0
Rochdale total			15	0	1	0	1	0	1	0	18	0
Grimsby Town	2010–11	Conference Premier	28	0	0	0	0	0	2 (Note: Appearance(s) in FA Trophy)	0	30	0
Grimsby Town	2011–12	Conference Premier	0	0	0	0	0	0	0	0	0	0
Grimsby Town total			28	0	0	0	0	0	2	0	30	0
→ Gainsborough Trinity (loan)	2011–12	Conference North	5	0	0	0	0	0	0	0	5	0
Airdrie United	2012–13	Scottish First Division	18	0	2	0	1	0	1	0	22	0
Airdrie United total			18	0	2	0	1	0	1	0	22	0
Annan Athletic	2013–14	Scottish League Two	33	0	3	0	0	0	2 (Note: 2 appearance(s) in Scottish League Two play-offs)	0	38	0
Annan Athletic total			33	0	3	0	0	0	2	0	38	0
Queen of the South	2014–15	Scottish Championship	0	0	0	0	0	0	0	0	0	0
Career total			407	0	35	0	14	0	16	0	472	0

== International career ==
Arthur received a late call-up to the Scotland national team alongside Maurice Ross of Rangers in April 2003 for a friendly against Austria after an injury forced Rab Douglas and Paul Lambert to withdraw, but he didn't feature.

He was capped for the Scotland B team against the Northern Ireland B team at Firhill, coming on as a substitute.

== Personal life ==
In January 2008, Arthur launched KA Goalkeeping, a website which sold KA goalkeeper gloves. As of 2016, KA goalkeeping and The brand Kaliaaer merged to continue as one entity (Kaliaaer) which he is partner.

== Honours ==
=== Partick Thistle ===
- Scottish Football League First Division: 2001–02
- Scottish Football League Second Division: 2000–01

=== Rochdale ===
- Football League Two: Promotion, 2009–10

=== Grimsby Town ===
- Lincolnshire Senior Cup: Winner, 2011–12
