= 1994–95 in Scottish football =

Premier Division champions
- Rangers

Division One champions
- Raith Rovers

Division Two champions
- Greenock Morton

Division Three champions
- Forfar Athletic

Scottish Cup winners
- Celtic

League Cup winners
- Raith Rovers

Challenge Cup winners
- Airdrieonians

Junior Cup winners
- Camelon Juniors

Teams in Europe
- Aberdeen, Celtic, Dundee United, Motherwell, Rangers

Scotland national team
- UEFA Euro 1996 qualifying, Kirin Cup
- ← 1993–94 1995–96 →

The 1994–95 season was the 98th season of competitive football in Scotland. This season saw the introduction of a fourth tier of league football (the Scottish 3rd Division) and also three points for a win being awarded instead of just two.

== Notable events ==
- Caledonian Thistle and Ross County make their debuts after being elected to the Scottish Football League, becoming the first Highland teams in the League's 104-year history.
- Raith Rovers winning the first Scottish League Cup of their history with a shock win over Celtic in the final.
- Celtic winning the Scottish Cup to end their six-year trophy drought.
- Rangers winning the Scottish Premier Division title for the seventh year running – their 45th top division title overall.
- Brian Laudrup, the Danish international forward, joining Rangers at the start of the season for £2.3million.
- Duncan Ferguson ending his 18-month spell at Rangers and signing for Everton in December after two months on loan at the English club.
- French international defender Basile Boli joining Rangers from Marseille in the pre-season for £2million and returning to his homeland with AS Monaco at the end of the season after picking up a league title medal.
- At the same time as signing Basile Boli, Rangers paid a further £2million for Hearts defender Alan McLaren.
- Legendary former Rangers, Motherwell and Scotland winger Davie Cooper dying suddenly in March at the age of 39 while on the books of Clydebank, where he was due to retire as a player at the end of the season.
- Celtic spending the season playing their home games at national stadium Hampden Park while Parkhead was being rebuilt as an all-seater stadium.
- Forfar Athletic becoming the very first champions of the Scottish Third Division.

== Scottish Premier Division ==
Pos	Team	Pld	W	D	L	GF	GA	GD	Pts	Qualification or relegation
1	Rangers (C)	36	20	9	7	60	35	+25	69	Qualification for the Champions League qualifying round
2	Motherwell	36	14	12	10	50	50	0	54	Qualification for the UEFA Cup preliminary round
3	Hibernian	36	12	17	7	49	37	+12	53	
4	Celtic	36	11	18	7	39	33	+6	51	Qualification for the Cup Winners' Cup first round (Note: Celtic qualified for the 1995–96 UEFA Cup Winners' Cup by winning the 1994–95 Scottish Cup.)
5	Falkirk	36	12	12	12	48	47	+1	48	
6	Heart of Midlothian	36	12	7	17	44	51	−7	43	
7	Kilmarnock	36	11	10	15	40	48	−8	43	
8	Partick Thistle	36	10	13	13	40	50	−10	43	Qualification for the Intertoto Cup group stage (Note: Partick Thistle qualified for the 1995 UEFA Intertoto Cup as the highest ranked Scottish club to apply for a place in the competition.)
9	Aberdeen (O)	36	10	11	15	43	46	−3	41	Qualification for the Play-off
10	Dundee United (R)	36	9	9	18	40	56	−16	36	Relegation to the 1995–96 Scottish First Division

Updated to match(es) played on end of season. Source: Soccerbase
Rules for classification: 1) Points; 2) Goal difference; 3) Goals scored
(C) Champions; (O) Play-off winners; (R) Relegated
Notes:

Champions: Rangers
Relegated: Dundee United

== Scottish League Division One ==
Pos	Team	Pld	W	D	L	GF	GA	GD	Pts	Promotion or relegation
1	Raith Rovers (C, P)	36	19	12	5	54	32	+22	69	Promotion to the Premier Division and qualification for UEFA Cup Preliminary round (Note: Raith Rovers qualified for the UEFA Cup as League Cup winners)
2	Dunfermline Athletic	36	18	14	4	73	37	+36	68	Qualification for the Play-off
3	Dundee	36	20	8	8	65	36	+29	68	
4	Airdrieonians	36	17	10	9	50	33	+17	61	
5	St Johnstone	36	14	14	8	59	39	+20	56	
6	Hamilton Academical	36	14	7	15	42	48	−6	49	
7	St Mirren	36	8	12	16	34	50	−16	36	
8	Clydebank	36	8	11	17	33	47	−14	35	
9	Ayr United (R)	36	6	11	19	31	58	−27	29	Relegation to the Second Division
10	Stranraer (R)	36	4	5	27	25	81	−56	17	Relegation to the Second Division

Source: RSSSF and statto
Rules for classification: 1) points; 2) goal difference; 3) number of goals scored.
(C) Champions; (P) Promoted; (R) Relegated
Notes:

Promoted: Raith Rovers
Relegated: Ayr United, Stranraer

== Scottish League Division Two ==
Pos	Team	Pld	W	D	L	GF	GA	GD	Pts	Promotion or relegation
1	Greenock Morton (C, P)	36	18	10	8	55	33	+22	64	Promotion to the First Division
2	Dumbarton (P)	36	17	9	10	57	35	+22	60	Promotion to the First Division
3	Stirling Albion	36	17	7	12	54	43	+11	58	
4	Stenhousemuir	36	14	14	8	46	39	+7	56	
5	Berwick Rangers	36	15	10	11	52	46	+6	55	
6	Clyde	36	14	10	12	53	48	+5	52	
7	Queen of the South	36	11	11	14	46	51	−5	44	
8	East Fife	36	11	10	15	48	56	−8	43	
9	Meadowbank Thistle (R)	36	11	5	20	32	54	−22	35 (Note: 3 points deducted)	Relegation to the Third Division
10	Brechin City (R)	36	6	6	24	22	60	−38	24	Relegation to the Third Division

Rules for classification: 1) points; 2) goal difference; 3) number of goals scored.
(C) Champions; (P) Promoted; (R) Relegated
Notes:

Promoted: Greenock Morton, Dumbarton
Relegated: Meadowbank Thistle, Brechin City

== Scottish League Division Three ==
Pos	Team	Pld	W	D	L	GF	GA	GD	Pts	Promotion
1	Forfar Athletic (C, P)	36	25	5	6	67	33	+34	80	Promotion to the Second Division
2	Montrose (P)	36	20	7	9	69	32	+37	67	Promotion to the Second Division
3	Ross County	36	18	6	12	59	44	+15	60	
4	East Stirlingshire	36	18	5	13	61	50	+11	59	
5	Alloa Athletic	36	15	9	12	50	45	+5	54	
6	Caledonian Thistle	36	12	9	15	48	61	−13	45	
7	Arbroath	36	13	5	18	51	62	−11	44	
8	Queen's Park	36	12	6	18	46	57	−11	42	
9	Cowdenbeath	36	11	7	18	48	60	−12	40	
10	Albion Rovers	36	5	3	28	27	82	−55	18	

Source: Soccerway
Rules for classification: 1) points; 2) goal difference; 3) number of goals scored.
(C) Champions; (P) Promoted

Promoted: Forfar Athletic, Montrose

== Other honours ==
=== Cup honours ===
Competition	Winner	Score	Runner-up
Scottish Cup 1994–95	Celtic	1 – 0	Airdrieonians
League Cup 1994–95	Raith Rovers	2 – 2 (a.e.t.) (6 – 5 pen.)	Celtic
Challenge Cup 1994–95	Airdrieonians	3 – 2 (a.e.t.)	Dundee
Youth Cup	Rangers	2 – 0	St Johnstone
Junior Cup	Camelon Juniors	2 – 0	Whitburn

== Individual honours ==
=== SPFA awards ===
Award	Winner	Club
Players' Player of the Year	(Denmark) Brian Laudrup	Rangers
Young Player of the Year	(Scotland) Charlie Miller	Rangers

=== SFWA awards ===
Award	Winner	Club
Footballer of the Year	(Denmark) Brian Laudrup	Rangers
Manager of the year	(Scotland) Walter Smith	Rangers

== Scottish clubs in Europe ==
Club	Competition(s)	Final round	Coef.
Rangers	UEFA Champions League	Qualifying round	0.00
Dundee United	UEFA Cup Winners' Cup	First round	2.00
Motherwell	UEFA Europa League	First round	2.00
Aberdeen	UEFA Europa League	Preliminary round	1.00

Average coefficient – 1.250

== Scotland national team ==
Date	Venue	Opponents	Score	Competition	Scotland scorer(s)
7 September 1994	Olympic Stadium, Helsinki (A)	Finland	2–0	ECQG8	Duncan Shearer, John Collins
12 October 1994	Hampden Park, Glasgow (H)	Faroe Islands	5–1	ECQG8	John Collins (2), Scott Booth, Billy McKinlay
16 November 1994	Hampden Park, Glasgow (H)	Russia	1–1	ECQG8	Scott Booth
18 December 1994	Olympic Stadium, Athens (A)	Greece	0–1	ECQG8	
29 March 1995	Luzhniki Stadium, Moscow (A)	Russia	0–0	ECQG8	
26 April 1995	Stadio Olimpico, Serravalle (A)	San Marino	2–0	ECQG8	John Collins, Colin Calderwood
21 May 1995	Big Arch Stadium, Hiroshima (A)	Japan	0–0	Kirin Cup	
24 May 1995	Toyama Park Stadium, Toyama (A)	Ecuador	2–1	Kirin Cup	John Robertson, Stevie Crawford
7 June 1995	Svangaskarð, Toftir (A)	Faroe Islands	2–0	ECQG8	Billy McKinlay, John McGinlay

Key:

- (H) = Home match
- (A) = Away match
- ECQG8 = European Championship qualifying – Group 8
