= Craig Smart (footballer, born 1975) =

Scottish footballer

Personal information
- Date of birth: 23 March 1975 (age 51)
- Place of birth: Dunfermline, Scotland
- Position: Midfielder

Youth career
- 1991–1993: Dunfermline

Senior career*
Years	Team	Apps	(Gls)
1993- 1995	Dunfermline Livingston		(3)
1995–1997	Livingston	48	(3)
1997–1998	Newry City		
1998-1999	Brechin City	30	(2)
- * Club domestic league appearances and goals

Craig Smart (born 23 March 1975) is a Scottish footballer who played as a midfielder for Livingston.

== Club career ==
He started his career in the youth ranks of Dunfermline, but left the club after 4 years to pursue regular 1st team starts.

In 1995, Smart signed for Livingston who had just renamed and relocated to West Lothian. He was part of the side that won the 1995–96 Scottish Third Division. The midfielder appeared 48 times for Livi before leaving the club in 1997.

Smart left Scotland in 1997 to sign for Newry City F.C. in Northern Ireland. The spell lasted just a season before he returned to Scotland to sign for Brechin City F.C.

After leaving the City, Smart signed for Hill of Beath Hawthorn.

== International career ==
Smart received an offer of a call up to the India national football team in 1996. He was eligible to represent the Blue Tigers as his grandfather was born in India. He did not accept the offer to represent India.

== Honours ==
Livingston

- Scottish Third Division: 1995–96

== External link ==
- Craig Smart at Soccerbase
