= 1994–95 Scottish Football League =

Scottish football season

Statistics of the Scottish Football League in season 1994–95.

== Scottish Premier Division ==
Pos	Team	Pld	W	D	L	GF	GA	GD	Pts	Qualification or relegation
1	Rangers (C)	36	20	9	7	60	35	+25	69	Qualification for the Champions League qualifying round
2	Motherwell	36	14	12	10	50	50	0	54	Qualification for the UEFA Cup preliminary round
3	Hibernian	36	12	17	7	49	37	+12	53	
4	Celtic	36	11	18	7	39	33	+6	51	Qualification for the Cup Winners' Cup first round (Note: Celtic qualified for the 1995–96 UEFA Cup Winners' Cup by winning the 1994–95 Scottish Cup.)
5	Falkirk	36	12	12	12	48	47	+1	48	
6	Heart of Midlothian	36	12	7	17	44	51	−7	43	
7	Kilmarnock	36	11	10	15	40	48	−8	43	
8	Partick Thistle	36	10	13	13	40	50	−10	43	Qualification for the Intertoto Cup group stage (Note: Partick Thistle qualified for the 1995 UEFA Intertoto Cup as the highest ranked Scottish club to apply for a place in the competition.)
9	Aberdeen (O)	36	10	11	15	43	46	−3	41	Qualification for the Play-off
10	Dundee United (R)	36	9	9	18	40	56	−16	36	Relegation to the 1995–96 Scottish First Division

Updated to match(es) played on end of season. Source: Soccerbase
Rules for classification: 1) Points; 2) Goal difference; 3) Goals scored
(C) Champions; (O) Play-off winners; (R) Relegated

== Scottish League Division One ==
Pos	Team	Pld	W	D	L	GF	GA	GD	Pts	Promotion or relegation
1	Raith Rovers (C, P)	36	19	12	5	54	32	+22	69	Promotion to the Premier Division
2	Dunfermline Athletic	36	18	14	4	73	37	+36	68	Qualification for the Play-off
3	Dundee	36	20	8	8	65	36	+29	68	
4	Airdrieonians	36	17	10	9	50	33	+17	61	
5	St Johnstone	36	14	14	8	59	39	+20	56	
6	Hamilton Academical	36	14	7	15	42	48	−6	49	
7	St Mirren	36	8	12	16	34	50	−16	36	
8	Clydebank	36	8	11	17	33	47	−14	35	
9	Ayr United (R)	36	6	11	19	31	58	−27	29	Relegation to the Second Division
10	Stranraer (R)	36	4	5	27	25	81	−56	17	Relegation to the Second Division

Source: RSSSF and statto
Rules for classification: 1) points; 2) goal difference; 3) number of goals scored.
(C) Champions; (P) Promoted; (R) Relegated

== Scottish League Division Two ==
Pos	Team	Pld	W	D	L	GF	GA	GD	Pts	Promotion or relegation
1	Greenock Morton (C, P)	36	18	10	8	55	33	+22	64	Promotion to the First Division
2	Dumbarton (P)	36	17	9	10	57	35	+22	60	Promotion to the First Division
3	Stirling Albion	36	17	7	12	54	43	+11	58	
4	Stenhousemuir	36	14	14	8	46	39	+7	56	
5	Berwick Rangers	36	15	10	11	52	46	+6	55	
6	Clyde	36	14	10	12	53	48	+5	52	
7	Queen of the South	36	11	11	14	46	51	−5	44	
8	East Fife	36	11	10	15	48	56	−8	43	
9	Meadowbank Thistle (R)	36	11	5	20	32	54	−22	35 (Note: 3 points deducted)	Relegation to the Third Division
10	Brechin City (R)	36	6	6	24	22	60	−38	24	Relegation to the Third Division

Rules for classification: 1) points; 2) goal difference; 3) number of goals scored.
(C) Champions; (P) Promoted; (R) Relegated

== Scottish League Division Three ==
Pos	Team	Pld	W	D	L	GF	GA	GD	Pts	Promotion
1	Forfar Athletic (C, P)	36	25	5	6	67	33	+34	80	Promotion to the Second Division
2	Montrose (P)	36	20	7	9	69	32	+37	67	Promotion to the Second Division
3	Ross County	36	18	6	12	59	44	+15	60	
4	East Stirlingshire	36	18	5	13	61	50	+11	59	
5	Alloa Athletic	36	15	9	12	50	45	+5	54	
6	Caledonian Thistle	36	12	9	15	48	61	−13	45	
7	Arbroath	36	13	5	18	51	62	−11	44	
8	Queen's Park	36	12	6	18	46	57	−11	42	
9	Cowdenbeath	36	11	7	18	48	60	−12	40	
10	Albion Rovers	36	5	3	28	27	82	−55	18	

Source: Soccerway
Rules for classification: 1) points; 2) goal difference; 3) number of goals scored.
(C) Champions; (P) Promoted

== See also ==
- 1994–95 in Scottish football
