= 1991–92 Scottish Football League =

Scottish football season

Statistics of the Scottish Football League in season 1991–92.

== Scottish Premier Division ==
Pos	Team	Pld	W	D	L	GF	GA	GD	Pts	Qualification or relegation
1	Rangers (C)	44	33	6	5	101	31	+70	72	Qualification for the Champions League first round
2	Heart of Midlothian	44	27	9	8	60	37	+23	63	Qualification for the UEFA Cup first round
3	Celtic	44	26	10	8	88	42	+46	62	Qualification for the UEFA Cup first round
4	Dundee United	44	19	13	12	66	50	+16	51	
5	Hibernian	44	16	17	11	53	45	+8	49	Qualification for the UEFA Cup first round
6	Aberdeen	44	17	14	13	55	42	+13	48	
7	Airdrieonians	44	13	10	21	50	70	−20	36	Qualification for the Cup Winners' Cup first round
8	St Johnstone	44	13	10	21	52	73	−21	36	
9	Falkirk	44	12	11	21	54	73	−19	35	
10	Motherwell	44	10	14	20	43	61	−18	34	
11	St Mirren (R)	44	6	12	26	33	73	−40	24	Relegation to the 1992–93 Scottish First Division
12	Dunfermline Athletic (R)	44	4	10	30	22	80	−58	18	Relegation to the 1992–93 Scottish First Division

Rules for classification: 1) points; 2) goal difference; 3) number of goals scored.
(C) Champions; (R) Relegated

== Scottish First Division ==
Pos	Team	Pld	W	D	L	GF	GA	GD	Pts	Promotion or relegation
1	Dundee (C, P)	44	23	12	9	80	48	+32	58	Promotion to the Premier Division
2	Partick Thistle (P)	44	23	11	10	62	36	+26	57	Promotion to the Premier Division
3	Hamilton Academical	44	22	13	9	72	48	+24	57	
4	Kilmarnock	44	21	12	11	59	37	+22	54	
5	Raith Rovers	44	21	11	12	59	42	+17	53	
6	Ayr United	44	18	11	15	63	55	+8	47	
7	Morton	44	17	12	15	66	59	+7	46	
8	Stirling Albion	44	14	13	17	50	57	−7	41	
9	Clydebank	44	12	12	20	59	77	−18	36	
10	Meadowbank Thistle	44	7	16	21	37	59	−22	30	
11	Montrose (R)	44	5	17	22	45	85	−40	27	Relegation to the Second Division
12	Forfar Athletic (R)	44	5	12	27	36	85	−49	22	Relegation to the Second Division

Source: RSSSF and statto
Rules for classification: 1) points; 2) goal difference; 3) number of goals scored.
(C) Champions; (P) Promoted; (R) Relegated

== Scottish Second Division ==
Pos	Team	Pld	W	D	L	GF	GA	GD	Pts	Promotion
1	Dumbarton (C, P)	39	20	12	7	65	37	+28	52	Promotion to the First Division
2	Cowdenbeath (P)	39	22	7	10	74	52	+22	51	Promotion to the First Division
3	Alloa Athletic	39	20	10	9	58	38	+20	50	
4	East Fife	39	19	11	9	72	57	+15	49	
5	Clyde	39	18	7	14	61	43	+18	43	
6	East Stirlingshire	39	15	11	13	61	70	−9	41	
7	Arbroath	39	12	14	13	49	48	+1	38	
8	Brechin City	39	13	12	14	54	55	−1	38	
9	Queen's Park	39	14	7	18	59	63	−4	35	
10	Stranraer	39	13	9	17	46	56	−10	35	
11	Queen of the South	39	14	5	20	71	86	−15	33	
12	Berwick Rangers	39	10	11	18	50	65	−15	31	
13	Stenhousemuir	39	11	8	20	46	57	−11	30	
14	Albion Rovers	39	5	10	24	42	81	−39	20	

Source: "1991-1992 Second Division - SPFL Archive". SPFL.
Rules for classification: 1) points; 2) goal difference; 3) number of goals scored.
(C) Champions; (P) Promoted

== See also ==
- 1991–92 in Scottish football
