= 1987–88 Scottish Football League =

Scottish football season

Statistics of the Scottish Football League in season 1987–88.

== Scottish Premier Division ==
Pos	Team	Pld	W	D	L	GF	GA	GD	Pts	Qualification or relegation
1	Celtic (C)	44	31	10	3	79	23	+56	72	Qualification for the European Cup first round
2	Heart of Midlothian	44	23	16	5	74	32	+42	62	Qualification for the UEFA Cup first round
3	Rangers	44	26	8	10	85	34	+51	60	Qualification for the UEFA Cup first round
4	Aberdeen	44	21	17	6	56	25	+31	59	Qualification for the UEFA Cup first round
5	Dundee United	44	16	15	13	54	47	+7	47	Qualification for the Cup Winners' Cup first round
6	Hibernian	44	12	19	13	41	42	−1	43	
7	Dundee	44	17	7	20	70	64	+6	41	
8	Motherwell	44	13	10	21	37	56	−19	36	
9	St Mirren	44	10	15	19	41	64	−23	35	
10	Falkirk (R)	44	10	11	23	41	75	−34	31	Relegation to the 1988–89 Scottish First Division
11	Dunfermline Athletic (R)	44	8	10	26	41	84	−43	26	Relegation to the 1988–89 Scottish First Division
12	Morton (R)	44	3	10	31	27	100	−73	16	Relegation to the 1988–89 Scottish First Division

Source: Statto
Rules for classification: 1) points; 2) goal difference; 3) number of goals scored.
(C) Champions; (R) Relegated

== Scottish First Division ==
Pos	Team	Pld	W	D	L	GF	GA	GD	Pts	Promotion or relegation
1	Hamilton Academical (C, P)	44	22	12	10	67	39	+28	56	Promotion to the Premier Division
2	Meadowbank Thistle	44	20	12	12	71	37	+34	52	
3	Clydebank	44	21	7	16	59	61	−2	49	
4	Forfar Athletic	44	16	16	12	67	58	+9	48	
5	Raith Rovers	44	19	7	18	81	76	+5	45	
6	Airdrieonians	44	16	13	15	65	68	−3	45	
7	Queen of the South	44	14	15	15	56	67	−11	43	
8	Partick Thistle	44	16	9	19	60	64	−4	41	
9	Clyde	44	16	6	22	73	75	−2	38	
10	Kilmarnock	44	13	11	20	55	60	−5	37	
11	East Fife (R)	44	13	10	21	61	76	−15	36	Relegation to the Second Division
12	Dumbarton (R)	44	12	12	20	51	70	−19	36	Relegation to the Second Division

Source: RSSSF and statto
Rules for classification: 1) points; 2) goal difference; 3) number of goals scored.
(C) Champions; (P) Promoted; (R) Relegated

== Scottish Second Division ==
Pos	Team	Pld	W	D	L	GF	GA	GD	Pts	Promotion
1	Ayr United (C, P)	39	27	7	5	95	31	+64	61	Promotion to the First Division
2	St Johnstone (P)	39	26	9	4	75	23	+52	61	Promotion to the First Division
3	Queen's Park	39	21	9	9	64	44	+20	51	
4	Brechin City	39	20	8	11	56	40	+16	48	
5	Stirling Albion	39	18	10	11	60	51	+9	46	
6	East Stirlingshire	39	15	13	11	52	48	+4	43	
7	Alloa Athletic	39	16	8	15	50	46	+4	40	
8	Montrose	39	12	11	16	45	51	−6	35	
9	Arbroath	39	10	14	15	54	66	−12	34	
10	Stenhousemuir	39	12	9	18	49	58	−9	33	
11	Cowdenbeath	39	9	13	17	50	67	−17	31	
12	Albion Rovers	39	10	11	18	45	75	−30	31	
13	Berwick Rangers	39	6	4	29	33	78	−45	16	
14	Stranraer	39	4	8	27	34	84	−50	16	

Source: "1987-1988 Second Division - SPFL Archive". SPFL.
Rules for classification: 1) points; 2) goal difference; 3) number of goals scored.
(C) Champions; (P) Promoted
