= 2012–13 Scottish Football League =

Irn-Bru Football League
- Season: 2012–13

Statistics of the Scottish Football League in season 2012–13.

== Scottish First Division ==
Pos	Team	Pld	W	D	L	GF	GA	GD	Pts	Promotion or relegation
1	Partick Thistle (C, P)	36	23	9	4	76	28	+48	78	Promotion to the Premiership
2	Greenock Morton	36	20	7	9	73	47	+26	67	
3	Falkirk	36	15	8	13	52	48	+4	53	
4	Livingston	36	14	10	12	58	56	+2	52	
5	Hamilton Academical	36	14	9	13	52	45	+7	51	
6	Raith Rovers	36	11	13	12	45	48	−3	46	
7	Dumbarton	36	13	4	19	58	83	−25	43	
8	Cowdenbeath	36	8	12	16	51	65	−14	36	
9	Dunfermline Athletic (R)	36	14	7	15	62	59	+3	34 (Note: Dunfermline Athletic were deducted 15 points for entering administration.)	Qualification for the First Division Play-offs
10	Airdrie United (R)	36	5	7	24	41	89	−48	22	Relegation to League One

Source: SPFL Archive
Rules for classification: 1) points; 2) goal difference; 3) number of goals scored.
(C) Champions; (P) Promoted; (R) Relegated

== Scottish Second Division ==
Pos	Team	Pld	W	D	L	GF	GA	GD	Pts	Promotion, qualification or relegation
1	Queen of the South (C, P)	36	29	5	2	92	23	+69	92	Promotion to the Championship
2	Alloa Athletic (O, P)	36	20	7	9	62	35	+27	67	Qualification for the First Division play-offs
3	Brechin City	36	19	4	13	72	59	+13	61	Qualification for the First Division play-offs
4	Forfar Athletic	36	17	3	16	67	74	−7	54	Qualification for the First Division play-offs
5	Arbroath	36	15	7	14	47	57	−10	52	
6	Stenhousemuir	36	12	13	11	59	59	0	49	
7	Ayr United	36	12	5	19	53	65	−12	41	
8	Stranraer	36	10	7	19	43	71	−28	37	
9	East Fife (O)	36	8	8	20	50	65	−15	32	Qualification for the Second Division play-offs
10	Albion Rovers (R)	36	7	3	26	45	82	−37	24	Relegation to the League Two

Source: SPFL Archive
Rules for classification: 1) points; 2) goal difference; 3) number of goals scored.
(C) Champions; (O) Play-off winners; (P) Promoted; (R) Relegated

== Scottish Third Division ==
Pos	Team	Pld	W	D	L	GF	GA	GD	Pts	Promotion or qualification
1	Rangers (C, P)	36	25	8	3	87	29	+58	83	Promotion to League One
2	Peterhead	36	17	8	11	52	28	+24	59	Qualification for the Second Division Play-offs
3	Queen's Park	36	16	8	12	60	54	+6	56	Qualification for the Second Division Play-offs
4	Berwick Rangers	36	14	7	15	59	55	+4	49	Qualification for the Second Division Play-offs
5	Elgin City	36	13	10	13	67	69	−2	49	
6	Montrose	36	12	11	13	60	68	−8	47	
7	Stirling Albion	36	12	9	15	59	58	+1	45	
8	Annan Athletic	36	11	10	15	54	65	−11	43	
9	Clyde	36	12	4	20	42	66	−24	40	
10	East Stirlingshire	36	8	5	23	49	97	−48	29	

Source: SPFL archive
Rules for classification: 1) points; 2) goal difference; 3) number of goals scored.
(C) Champions; (P) Promoted

== See also ==
- 2012–13 in Scottish football
