= 2002–03 Scottish Football League =

Scottish football season

Statistics of the Scottish Football League in season 2002–03. The season saw two new teams, as Airdrie United and Gretna replaced Clydebank and Airdrieonians.

== Scottish First Division ==
Pos	Team	Pld	W	D	L	GF	GA	GD	Pts	Promotion or relegation
1	Falkirk (C)	36	25	6	5	80	32	+48	81	
2	Clyde	36	21	9	6	66	37	+29	72	
3	St Johnstone	36	20	7	9	49	29	+20	67	
4	Inverness CT	36	20	5	11	74	45	+29	65	
5	Queen of the South	36	12	12	12	45	48	−3	48	
6	Ayr United	36	12	9	15	34	44	−10	45	
7	St Mirren	36	9	10	17	42	71	−29	37	
8	Ross County	36	9	8	19	42	46	−4	35	
9	Alloa Athletic (R)	36	9	8	19	39	72	−33	35	Relegation to the Second Division
10	Arbroath (R)	36	3	6	27	30	77	−47	15	Relegation to the Second Division

Source: "2002-2003 First Division - SPFL Archive". SPFL.
Rules for classification: 1) points; 2) goal difference; 3) number of goals scored.
(C) Champions; (R) Relegated

== Scottish Second Division ==
Pos	Team	Pld	W	D	L	GF	GA	GD	Pts	Promotion or relegation
1	Raith Rovers (C, P)	36	16	11	9	53	36	+17	59	Promotion to the First Division
2	Brechin City (P)	36	16	7	13	63	59	+4	55	Promotion to the First Division
3	Airdrie United	36	14	12	10	51	44	+7	54	
4	Forfar Athletic	36	14	9	13	55	53	+2	51	
5	Berwick Rangers	36	13	10	13	43	48	−5	49	
6	Dumbarton	36	13	9	14	48	47	+1	48	
7	Stenhousemuir	36	12	11	13	49	51	−2	47	
8	Hamilton Academical	36	12	11	13	43	48	−5	47	
9	Stranraer (R)	36	12	8	16	49	57	−8	44	Relegation to the Third Division
10	Cowdenbeath (R)	36	8	12	16	46	57	−11	36	Relegation to the Third Division

Rules for classification: 1) points; 2) goal difference; 3) number of goals scored.
(C) Champions; (P) Promoted; (R) Relegated

== Scottish Third Division ==
Pos	Team	Pld	W	D	L	GF	GA	GD	Pts	Promotion
1	Greenock Morton (C, P)	36	21	9	6	67	33	+34	72	Promotion to the Second Division
2	East Fife (P)	36	20	11	5	73	37	+36	71	Promotion to the Second Division
3	Albion Rovers	36	20	10	6	62	36	+26	70	
4	Peterhead	36	20	8	8	76	37	+39	68	
5	Stirling Albion	36	15	11	10	50	44	+6	56	
6	Gretna	36	11	12	13	50	50	0	45	
7	Montrose	36	7	12	17	35	61	−26	33	
8	Queen's Park	36	7	11	18	39	51	−12	32	
9	Elgin City	36	5	13	18	33	63	−30	28	
10	East Stirlingshire	36	2	7	27	32	105	−73	13	

Source: "2002-2003 Third Division - SPFL Archive". SPFL (in Polish).
Rules for classification: 1) points; 2) goal difference; 3) number of goals scored.
(C) Champions; (P) Promoted

== See also ==
- 2002–03 in Scottish football
