= 1992–93 Scottish Football League =

Scottish football season

Statistics of the Scottish Football League in season 1992–93.

== Scottish Premier Division ==
Pos	Team	Pld	W	D	L	GF	GA	GD	Pts	Qualification or relegation
1	Rangers (C)	44	33	7	4	97	35	+62	73	Qualification for the Champions League first round
2	Aberdeen	44	27	10	7	87	36	+51	64	Qualification for the Cup Winners' Cup first round
3	Celtic	44	24	12	8	68	41	+27	60	Qualification for the UEFA Cup first round
4	Dundee United	44	19	9	16	56	49	+7	47	Qualification for the UEFA Cup first round
5	Heart of Midlothian	44	15	14	15	46	51	−5	44	Qualification for the UEFA Cup first round
6	St Johnstone	44	10	20	14	52	66	−14	40	
7	Hibernian	44	12	13	19	54	64	−10	37	
8	Partick Thistle	44	12	12	20	50	71	−21	36	
9	Motherwell	44	11	13	20	46	62	−16	35	
10	Dundee	44	11	12	21	48	68	−20	34	
11	Falkirk (R)	44	11	7	26	60	86	−26	29	Relegation to the 1993–94 Scottish First Division
12	Airdrieonians (R)	44	6	17	21	35	70	−35	29	Relegation to the 1993–94 Scottish First Division

Source: RSSSF
Rules for classification: 1) points; 2) goal difference; 3) number of goals scored.
(C) Champions; (R) Relegated

== Scottish First Division ==
Pos	Team	Pld	W	D	L	GF	GA	GD	Pts	Promotion or relegation
1	Raith Rovers (C, P)	44	25	15	4	85	41	+44	65	Promotion to the Premier Division
2	Kilmarnock (P)	44	21	12	11	67	40	+27	54	Promotion to the Premier Division
3	Dunfermline Athletic	44	22	8	14	64	47	+17	52	
4	St Mirren	44	21	9	14	62	52	+10	51	
5	Hamilton Academical	44	19	12	13	65	45	+20	50	
6	Morton	44	19	10	15	65	56	+9	48	
7	Ayr United	44	14	18	12	49	44	+5	46	
8	Clydebank	44	16	13	15	71	66	+5	45	
9	Dumbarton	44	15	7	22	56	71	−15	37	
10	Stirling Albion	44	11	13	20	44	61	−17	35	
11	Meadowbank Thistle (R)	44	11	10	23	51	80	−29	32	Relegation to the Second Division
12	Cowdenbeath (R)	44	3	7	34	32	109	−77	13	Relegation to the Second Division

Source: RSSSF and statto
Rules for classification: 1) points; 2) goal difference; 3) number of goals scored.
(C) Champions; (P) Promoted; (R) Relegated

== Scottish Second Division ==
Pos	Team	Pld	W	D	L	GF	GA	GD	Pts	Promotion
1	Clyde (C, P)	39	22	10	7	77	42	+35	54	Promotion to the First Division
2	Brechin City (P)	39	23	7	9	62	32	+30	53	Promotion to the First Division
3	Stranraer	39	19	15	5	69	44	+25	53	
4	Forfar Athletic	39	18	10	11	74	54	+20	46	
5	Alloa Athletic	39	16	12	11	63	54	+9	44	
6	Arbroath	39	18	8	13	59	50	+9	44	
7	Stenhousemuir	39	15	10	14	59	48	+11	40	
8	Berwick Rangers	39	16	7	16	56	64	−8	39	
9	East Fife	39	14	10	15	70	64	+6	38	
10	Queen of the South	39	12	9	18	57	72	−15	33	
11	Queen's Park	39	8	12	19	51	73	−22	28	
12	Montrose	39	10	7	22	46	71	−25	27	
13	East Stirlingshire	39	8	9	22	50	85	−35	25	
14	Albion Rovers	39	6	10	23	36	76	−40	22	

Source: "1992-1993 Second Division - SPFL Archive". SPFL.
Rules for classification: 1) points; 2) goal difference; 3) number of goals scored.
(C) Champions; (P) Promoted

== See also ==
- 1992–93 in Scottish football
