= Scottish Football League =

Defunct association football league in Scotland

Scottish Football League (SFL)
- Founded: 1890
- Folded: 2013
- Country: Scotland
- Confederation: UEFA
- Last champions: Partick Thistle (2012–13)
- Most championships: Rangers (47 titles) (Note: The Scottish Football League existed between 1890 and 2013, and did not contain the top division of Scottish league football between 1998 and 2013 (Scottish Premier League). For a complete record of clubs that have won Scottish league championships, see list of Scottish football champions.)

The Scottish Football League (SFL) was a football league featuring professional and semi-professional football clubs mostly from Scotland. (Note: One club, Berwick Rangers, is based in the town of Berwick-upon-Tweed, which is located approximately 4 km south of the Anglo-Scottish border.) From its foundation in 1890 until the breakaway Scottish Premier League (SPL) was formed in 1998, the SFL was the top level of football in Scotland. After 1998, the SFL represented levels 2 to 4 of the Scottish football league system. In June 2013, the SFL merged with the SPL to form the Scottish Professional Football League.

The SFL was associated with a title sponsor from the 1985–86 season. As this sponsor changed over the years the league was known in turn as the Fine Fare League, B&Q League, Bell's Scottish Football League and finally as the Irn-Bru Scottish Football League. The SFL also organised two knock-out cup competitions, the Scottish League Cup and the Scottish Challenge Cup.

== History ==
=== Formation ===
Organised football in Scotland began in 1873 with the formation of the Scottish Football Association (SFA). During the next 15 years or so, clubs would play friendly matches, Scottish Cup ties and local cup (e.g. Glasgow Cup or East of Scotland Shield) ties. The Football League, initially containing clubs from the North West and Midlands of England, was formed in 1888. This had been done in response to the professionalisation of football in England in 1885, with the regular diet of league fixtures replacing the haphazard arrangement of friendlies. Many Scottish players, known as the Scotch Professors, moved to the English league clubs to receive the relatively high salaries on offer.

This prompted Scottish clubs into thinking about forming their own league. In March 1890, the secretary of Renton wrote to thirteen other clubs inviting them to discuss the organisation of a league. All of the clubs accepted the invitation, except Queen's Park and Clyde. Amateur club Queen's Park, who were the oldest organised club in Scotland and had played a key role in the development of football, were opposed to the league because it would lead to professionalism and eliminate many of the smaller clubs. These concerns were to prove well-founded, as six of the founder members would leave the league before 1900.

The Scottish Football League (SFL) was inaugurated on 30 April 1890. The first season of competition, 1890–91, commenced with 11 clubs because St Bernard's were not elected. The eleven original clubs in membership were Abercorn, Cambuslang, Celtic, Cowlairs, Dumbarton, Heart of Midlothian, Rangers, Renton, St Mirren, Third Lanark and Vale of Leven. Renton were expelled after five games of the 1890–91 season for playing against St Bernard's, who had been found guilty of concealed professionalism. Renton raised an action against the SFA in the Court of Session and won, which meant that their SFA and SFL memberships were restored.

In the 1890–91 season, Rangers and Dumbarton were level at the top of the league on 29 points. The teams drew 2–2 in a play-off match, but no further thought had been given to separating teams by another method and the championship was shared. Goal average was introduced for the 1921–22 season and replaced by goal difference for the 1971–72 season.

=== Split into divisions ===
The league proved to be highly successful, and in 1893, a second tier was formed by the inclusion of a number of clubs previously in the Scottish Football Alliance. Promotion was initially based on a ballot of clubs; automatic promotion was not introduced until 1922.

The onset of World War I saw Division Two but not Division One being suspended, not restarting again until 1921 when the Central Football League was absorbed as a new division with automatic promotion.

=== Division Three ===
In 1923, the League decided to introduce a third tier. The Western League was used as its backbone but the new set-up lasted only three years before it collapsed under heavy financial losses. From 1926 until 1946, the League reverted to two divisions with many of the third tier clubs joining the second iteration of Scottish Football Alliance.

Post-World War II reforms saw the League resume with three divisions, renamed 'A', 'B' and 'C' with the last section also including reserve sides. In 1947, league championship trophies were introduced for the first time for the top two divisions, until then only flags had been presented to the winners. The new trophies were engraved with the names of all previous winners.

In 1949, the 'C' Division was expanded to two sections – South-East (North-East from 1950) and South-West. The withdrawal of the reserves from 'C' Division in 1955 saw a return to two divisions with the 5 first teams in Division C being given automatic promotion. There were then 18 clubs in Division A and 19 in Division B. In 1956 the divisions were renamed Division 1 and Division 2.

Clydebank were elected to Division Two as the 20th club in 1966, but following the demise of Third Lanark in 1967, Division Two kept operating with just 19 clubs; the situation would not be corrected until the next change of format, which happened in 1975.

This change of structure split the league into three divisions, Premier, First, and Second Divisions. This permitted more frequent fixtures between the top clubs; the expectation was that meant greater revenue for them, and it was hoped it would stimulate greater interest, at a time when attendance at league matches had dropped alarmingly. One year before the restructuring, a new club entered the league, Meadowbank Thistle (which would eventually become Livingston). This three-divisional structure of 38 clubs continued until 1994.

=== Four-division period and SPL split ===
After a couple of decades, in 1994 the league again reorganised (following an attempted 'Super League' breakaway by the top clubs in 1992) with four divisions of 10 teams, as Highland League clubs Inverness Caledonian Thistle (a merger of two existing clubs in the city) and Ross County were elected to round out the league. At the same time, the SFL adopted the system of three points for a win. In 1998 the Premier Division clubs split from the league to form the Scottish Premier League (SPL). The remaining leagues, of ten clubs each, kept their names and the Premier Division was not reconstituted, leaving First, Second and Third Divisions. Part of the agreement was that the SPL would expand to 12 clubs in 2000. The SFL then took in two new members to replace the two clubs lost to the SPL; Highland League clubs Elgin City and Peterhead were admitted, increasing the total number of clubs in the Scottish football league system to 42.

From 2005, the SFL determined a promotion and relegation place between each division according to playoffs between four clubs. The playoffs were contested between the ninth placed (second bottom) club in the higher division and the second, third and fourth placed clubs in the lower division. It was therefore possible for a team finishing fourth in the Second Division or Third Division to be promoted, rather than the clubs finishing immediately above them in the standings. It was also possible for the ninth placed club to retain their position in the higher division.

Our review of non-financial matters indicate an organisation which is not wholly suited to the modern-day business environment, or the size of the league.

— Pannell Kerr Foster, BBC Sport website

In March 2007, a self-conducted review found the league to be three times more expensive to run than equivalent leagues in England, with a report stating the league structure was "outdated": the report found that the Football Conference had four employees looking after 68 clubs, while the SFL had 14 people running leagues with just 30 clubs.

=== Merger ===
No clubs were relegated from the bottom end of the Scottish Football League, although there were changes of membership due to clubs going out of business. The Scottish Football Association were keen for a pyramid system to be instituted. SFL First Division clubs wanted to gain a greater share of the media revenue generated by the SPL. In 2013, both the SPL and SFL voted in favour of merging to form the new Scottish Professional Football League. The number of divisions and clubs in each division remained the same, but there were changes to the financial distribution model. The first club to be promoted to the SPFL from the new Lowland League via playoffs was Edinburgh City in 2016 at the expense of East Stirlingshire, while in 2019 Cove Rangers were the first Highland League champions to go up, replacing Berwick Rangers.

== Cup competitions ==
The Scottish Football League organised two knock-out cup competitions: the Scottish League Cup and the Scottish Challenge Cup. The League Cup was established in 1946, succeeding the wartime Southern League Cup. Unlike the Scottish Cup, organised by the Scottish Football Association, the League Cup was only open to Scottish Football League clubs. Scottish Premier League clubs continued to participate in the League Cup after the top tier clubs broke away in 1998. Until the mid-1990s, the competition winner was eligible to participate in the UEFA Cup, but this was discontinued due to a loss of European places.

The Scottish Challenge Cup was instituted in 1990, to celebrate the League's centenary. The Challenge Cup was only open to Scottish Football League clubs outside the top division of the Scottish football league system. From 2011, two Highland Football League clubs were allowed to participate each year in the Challenge Cup, to give a round number of 32 clubs participating. Both the League Cup and the Challenge Cup continued under the auspices of the Scottish Professional Football League.

== League sponsorship and media rights ==
From 1985, the League accepted sponsorships for its main competition. Below is a list of sponsors and the League's name under their sponsorship:

- 1985–1988: Fine Fare (Fine Fare League)
- 1988–1992: B&Q (B&Q League)
- 1992–1994: No sponsor
- 1994–1998: Bell's whisky (Bell's League)
- 1998–1999: No sponsor
- 1999–2006: Bell's whisky (Bell's League)
- 2006–2007: No sponsor
- 2007–2013: Irn-Bru (Irn-Bru League)

The League's cup competitions have had different sponsors, with the Scottish League Cup first attracting sponsorship in 1979. The competition was revamped in 1984, adopting a straight knock-out format, when Skol Lager began its sponsorship. The Co-operative Insurance company sponsored the League Cup for 12 seasons, until the 2010–11 competition. It has since been sponsored by the Scottish Government, under the name of the Scottish Communities League Cup. The Scottish Challenge Cup was created by League sponsor B&Q in 1990, but it was cancelled in 1998–99 due to a lack of sponsorship. Since 2008, the Challenge Cup has attracted its own sponsor, with BBC Alba and Ramsdens providing support.

Before 1979, the major source of revenue to Scottish Football League clubs, apart from their attendances, was from the football pools. In the year ended 31 March 1983, the pools generated £1.08 million out of a total of £1.46 million. By 1990, this source of income had been overtaken by revenue from sponsorships and television rights. As of 1990, 75% of these central revenues were split equally between the 38 member clubs, with the remaining 25% allocated according to each club's position in the league ladder. During the 1970s and 1980s, the main terrestrial television companies (STV and BBC Scotland) produced shows (Scotsport and Sportscene respectively) containing highlights of league matches. The revenues from these broadcasts were relatively small, with the companies paying less than £1000 per match in the mid-1970s. BBC Radio Scotland had exclusive rights for live radio coverage of matches at this time, with independent stations such as Radio Clyde providing coverage via score updates and analysis.

The first live television broadcast of a Scottish league match was not until April 1986. Earlier in the 1985–86 season, there had been no television coverage at all due to a dispute between the League and the broadcasters. The birth of satellite broadcaster British Sky Broadcasting (Sky TV) changed the situation significantly. As ITV had an exclusive contract for live coverage of games in the English league, the first match shown on Sky was a Scottish Premier Division match between Rangers and Dundee United in April 1991. A year later, the top division English clubs formed a breakaway Premier League, signing an exclusive television contract with Sky. Live Scottish Premier Division games were shown on STV during the 1990s, but the top division clubs formed the breakaway Scottish Premier League in 1998 and signed an exclusive broadcast contract with Sky.

This left the remaining Scottish Football League clubs without live coverage, although STV continued to show highlights of First Division games in their Football First show. Scots Gaelic channel BBC Alba provided coverage of Scottish Football League games, including the Challenge Cup, from its launch in 2008. Live coverage on English language channels returned to Scottish Football League games in the 2012–13 season, as Sky and ESPN agreed contracts to show Third Division matches involving Rangers. These arrangements secured revenues that had been under threat due to the financial collapse of Rangers.

== Member clubs ==
Of the original SFL clubs, Celtic, Dumbarton, Heart of Midlothian, Rangers and St Mirren are the only clubs today playing in the successor Scottish Professional Football League. Every other club is either defunct or out of the League.

Club	First season in SFL	Last season in SFL	Last national title
Abercorn	1890–91	1914–15	—
Aberdeen	1904–05	1997–98	1984–85
Airdrieonians (1878)	1894–95	2001–02	—
Airdrieonians (2002)	2002–03	2012–13	—
Albion Rovers	1903–04	2012–13	—
Alloa Athletic	1921–22	2012–13	—
Annan Athletic	2008–09	2012–13	—
Arbroath	1921–22	2012–13	—
Armadale	1921–22	1931–32	—
Arthurlie	1901–02	1928–29	—
Ayr	1897–98	1909–10	—
Ayr Parkhouse	1902–03	1909–10	—
Ayr United	1910–11	2012–13	—
Bathgate	1921–22	1928–29	—
Beith	1923–24	1925–26	—
Berwick Rangers	1951–52	2012–13	—
Bo'ness	1921–22	1931–32	—
Brechin City	1923–24	2012–13	—
Broxburn United	1921–22	1925–26	—
Cambuslang	1890–91	1891–92	—
Celtic	1890–91	1997–98	1997–98
Clackmannan	1921–22	1925–26	—
Clyde	1891–92	2012–13	—
Clydebank (1914)	1914–15	1930–31	—
Clydebank (1965)	1965–66	2001–02	—
Cowdenbeath	1905–06	2012–13	—
Cowlairs	1890–91	1894–95	—
Dumbarton	1890–91	2012–13	1891–92
Dumbarton Harp	1923–24	1924–25	—
Dundee	1893–94	2011–12	1961–62
Dundee United	1910–11	1997–98	1982–83
Dundee Wanderers	1894–95	1894–95	—
Dunfermline Athletic	1912–13	2012–13	—
Dykehead	1923–24	1925–26	—
East Fife	1921–22	2012–13	—
East Stirlingshire	1900–01	2012–13	—
Edinburgh City (1928)	1931–32	1948–49	—
Elgin City	2000–01	2012–13	—
Falkirk	1902–03	2012–13	—
Forfar Athletic	1921–22	2012–13	—
Galston	1923–24	1925–26	—
Greenock Morton	1893–94	2012–13	—
Gretna	2002–03	2006–07	—
Hamilton Academical	1897–98	2012–13	—
Heart of Midlothian	1890–91	1997–98	1959–60
Helensburgh	1923–24	1925–26	—
Hibernian	1893–94	1998–99	1951–52
Inverness Caledonian Thistle	1994–95	2009–10	—
Johnstone	1912–13	1925–26	—
Kilmarnock	1895–96	1997–98	1964–65
King's Park	1921–22	1938–39	—
Leith Athletic	1891–92	1952–53	—
Linthouse	1895–96	1899–1900	—
Livingston	1995–96	2012–13	—
Lochgelly United	1914–15	1925–26	—
Meadowbank Thistle	1974–75	1994–95	—
Mid-Annandale	1923–24	1925–26	—
Montrose	1923–24	2012–13	—
Motherwell	1893–94	1997–98	1931–32
Nithsdale Wanderers (1897)	1923–24	1926–27	—
Northern	1893–94	1893–94	—
Partick Thistle	1893–94	2012–13	—
Peebles Rovers	1923–24	1925–26	—
Peterhead	2000–01	2012–13	—
Port Glasgow Athletic	1893–94	1910–11	—
Queen of the South	1923–24	2012–13	—
Queen's Park	1900–01	2012–13	—
Raith Rovers	1902–03	2012–13	—
Rangers	1890–91	2012–13	1996–97
Renton	1890–91	1897–98	—
Ross County	1994–95	2011–12	—
Royal Albert	1923–24	1925–26	—
St Bernard's	1893–94	1938–39	—
St Johnstone	1897–98	2008–09	—
St Mirren	1890–91	2005–06	—
Solway Star	1923–24	1925–26	—
Stenhousemuir	1921–22	2012–13	—
Stirling Albion	1946–47	2012–13	—
Stranraer	1949–50	2012–13	—
Third Lanark	1890–91	1966–67	1903–04
Thistle	1893–94	1893–94	—
Vale of Leven	1890–91	1925–26	—

== Past winners ==
When the Scottish Football League was established in 1890, all of the clubs played in just one division. In 1893 the Scottish Football League absorbed many clubs from the Scottish Football Alliance and had enough clubs to form another division. The existing division was renamed Division One and the new division was called Division Two. Nevertheless, promotion and relegation between the top two divisions was not automatic until 1921–22 when Division Two was brought back after a hiatus provoked by World War I which affected only that division; hence some teams of the era winning Division Two twice in a row before being promoted, and some Division Two winners being never promoted at all.

A third tier of Scottish league football was first established in the 1923–24 season, but it only lasted for two full seasons due to financial difficulties. A third tier league (called Division C) was reintroduced in 1946–47. Division C, which also included reserve teams of higher division clubs, operated as a national competition for the first three seasons but thereafter it was split into two regional sections. During this period only full-strength clubs (not reserve teams) were promoted if they finished as champions. The two-division tier was abolished after the 1954–55 season.

Since the 1975–76 season there has been a third tier, known as the Second Division. The top tier became the Premier Division and the second tier became known as the First Division. A fourth tier, known as the Third Division, was introduced in 1994. The last major change within the Scottish football league system was in 1998–99, when the Premier Division clubs broke away from the Scottish Football League to form the Scottish Premier League. The remaining Scottish Football League divisions continued as before.

No.	Season	1st tier	2nd tier	3rd tier	4th tier
1.	1890–91	Dumbarton (share); Rangers (share)	—	—	—
2.	1891–92	Dumbarton	—	—	—
3.	1892–93	Celtic	—	—	—
4.	1893–94	Celtic	Hibernian	—	—
5.	1894–95	Heart of Midlothian	Hibernian	—	—
6.	1895–96	Celtic	Abercorn	—	—
7.	1896–97	Heart of Midlothian	Partick Thistle	—	—
8.	1897–98	Celtic	Kilmarnock	—	—
9.	1898–99	Rangers	Kilmarnock	—	—
10.	1899–1900	Rangers	Partick Thistle	—	—
11.	1900–01	Rangers	St Bernard's	—	—
12.	1901–02	Rangers	Port Glasgow Athletic	—	—
13.	1902–03	Hibernian	Airdrieonians	—	—
14.	1903–04	Third Lanark	Hamilton Academical	—	—
15.	1904–05	Celtic	Clyde	—	—
16.	1905–06	Celtic	Leith Athletic	—	—
17.	1906–07	Celtic	St Bernard's	—	—
18.	1907–08	Celtic	Raith Rovers	—	—
19.	1908–09	Celtic	Abercorn	—	—
20.	1909–10	Celtic	Leith Athletic (share); Raith Rovers (share)	—	—
21.	1910–11	Rangers	Dumbarton	—	—
22.	1911–12	Rangers	Ayr United	—	—
23.	1912–13	Rangers	Ayr United	—	—
24.	1913–14	Celtic	Cowdenbeath	—	—
25.	1914–15	Celtic	Cowdenbeath	—	—
26.	1915–16	Celtic	—	—	—
27.	1916–17	Celtic	—	—	—
28.	1917–18	Rangers	—	—	—
29.	1918–19	Celtic	—	—	—
30.	1919–20	Rangers	—	—	—
31.	1920–21	Rangers	—	—	—
32.	1921–22	Celtic	Alloa Athletic	—	—
33.	1922–23	Rangers	Queen's Park	—	—
34.	1923–24	Rangers	St Johnstone	Arthurlie	—
35.	1924–25	Rangers	Dundee United	Nithsdale Wanderers	—
36.	1925–26	Celtic	Dunfermline Athletic	Not awarded (Note: Helensburgh gained the most points, but no title was awarded as they were the only club to complete their fixtures.)	—
37.	1926–27	Rangers	Bo'ness United	—	—
38.	1927–28	Rangers	Ayr United	—	—
39.	1928–29	Rangers	Dundee United	—	—
40.	1929–30	Rangers	Leith Athletic	—	—
41.	1930–31	Rangers	Third Lanark	—	—
42.	1931–32	Motherwell	East Stirlingshire	—	—
43.	1932–33	Rangers	Hibernian	—	—
44.	1933–34	Rangers	Albion Rovers	—	—
45.	1934–35	Rangers	Third Lanark	—	—
46.	1935–36	Celtic	Falkirk	—	—
47.	1936–37	Rangers	Ayr United	—	—
48.	1937–38	Celtic	Raith Rovers	—	—
49.	1938–39	Rangers	Cowdenbeath	—	—
50.	1939–40	League abandoned after five matches due to the commencement of World War II.			
—	1940–46	League suspended due to World War II.			
51.	1946–47	Rangers	Dundee	Stirling Albion	—
52.	1947–48	Hibernian	East Fife	East Stirlingshire	—
53.	1948–49	Rangers	Raith Rovers	Forfar Athletic	—
54.	1949–50	Rangers	Morton	Hibernian A	—
54.	1949–50	Rangers	Morton	Clyde A	—
55.	1950–51	Hibernian	Queen of the South	Heart of Midlothian A	—
55.	1950–51	Hibernian	Queen of the South	Clyde A	—
56.	1951–52	Hibernian	Clyde	Dundee A	—
56.	1951–52	Hibernian	Clyde	Rangers A	—
57.	1952–53	Rangers	Stirling Albion	Aberdeen A	—
57.	1952–53	Rangers	Stirling Albion	Rangers A	—
58.	1953–54	Celtic	Motherwell	Brechin City	—
58.	1953–54	Celtic	Motherwell	Rangers A	—
59.	1954–55	Aberdeen	Airdrieonians	Aberdeen A	—
59.	1954–55	Aberdeen	Airdrieonians	Partick Thistle A	—
60.	1955–56	Rangers	Queen's Park	—	—
61.	1956–57	Rangers	Clyde	—	—
62.	1957–58	Heart of Midlothian	Stirling Albion	—	—
63.	1958–59	Rangers	Ayr United	—	—
64.	1959–60	Heart of Midlothian	St Johnstone	—	—
65.	1960–61	Rangers	Stirling Albion	—	—
66.	1961–62	Dundee	Clyde	—	—
67.	1962–63	Rangers	St Johnstone	—	—
68.	1963–64	Rangers	Morton	—	—
69.	1964–65	Kilmarnock	Stirling Albion	—	—
70.	1965–66	Celtic	Ayr United	—	—
71.	1966–67	Celtic	Morton	—	—
72.	1967–68	Celtic	St Mirren	—	—
73.	1968–69	Celtic	Motherwell	—	—
74.	1969–70	Celtic	Falkirk	—	—
75.	1970–71	Celtic	Partick Thistle	—	—
76.	1971–72	Celtic	Dumbarton	—	—
77.	1972–73	Celtic	Clyde	—	—
78.	1973–74	Celtic	Airdrieonians	—	—
79.	1974–75	Rangers	Falkirk	—	—
80.	1975–76	Rangers	Partick Thistle	Clydebank	—
81.	1976–77	Celtic	St Mirren	Stirling Albion	—
82.	1977–78	Rangers	Morton	Clyde	—
83.	1978–79	Celtic	Dundee	Berwick Rangers	—
84.	1979–80	Aberdeen	Heart of Midlothian	Falkirk	—
85.	1980–81	Celtic	Hibernian	Queen's Park	—
86.	1981–82	Celtic	Motherwell	Clyde	—
87.	1982–83	Dundee United	St Johnstone	Brechin City	—
88.	1983–84	Aberdeen	Morton	Forfar Athletic	—
89.	1984–85	Aberdeen	Motherwell	Montrose	—
90.	1985–86	Celtic	Hamilton Academical	Dunfermline Athletic	—
91.	1986–87	Rangers	Morton	Meadowbank Thistle	—
92.	1987–88	Celtic	Hamilton Academical	Ayr United	—
93.	1988–89	Rangers	Dunfermline Athletic	Albion Rovers	—
94.	1989–90	Rangers	St Johnstone	Brechin City	—
95.	1990–91	Rangers	Falkirk	Stirling Albion	—
96.	1991–92	Rangers	Dundee	Dumbarton	—
97.	1992–93	Rangers	Raith Rovers	Clyde	—
98.	1993–94	Rangers	Falkirk	Stranraer	—
99.	1994–95	Rangers	Raith Rovers	Morton	Forfar Athletic
100.	1995–96	Rangers	Dunfermline Athletic	Stirling Albion	Livingston
101.	1996–97	Rangers	St Johnstone	Ayr United	Inverness Caledonian Thistle
102.	1997–98	Celtic	Dundee	Stranraer	Alloa Athletic
103.	1998–99	—	Hibernian	Livingston	Ross County
104.	1999–2000	—	St Mirren	Clyde	Queen's Park
105.	2000–01	—	Livingston	Partick Thistle	Hamilton Academical
106.	2001–02	—	Partick Thistle	Queen of the South	Brechin City
107.	2002–03	—	Falkirk	Raith Rovers	Morton
108.	2003–04	—	Inverness Caledonian Thistle	Airdrie United	Stranraer
109.	2004–05	—	Falkirk	Brechin City	Gretna
110.	2005–06	—	St. Mirren	Gretna	Cowdenbeath
111.	2006–07	—	Gretna	Morton	Berwick Rangers
112.	2007–08	—	Hamilton Academical	Ross County	East Fife
113.	2008–09	—	St Johnstone	Raith Rovers	Dumbarton
114.	2009–10	—	Inverness Caledonian Thistle	Stirling Albion	Livingston
115.	2010–11	—	Dunfermline Athletic	Livingston	Arbroath
116.	2011–12	—	Ross County	Cowdenbeath	Alloa Athletic
117.	2012–13	—	Partick Thistle	Queen of the South	Rangers

== Scottish Football League XI ==
The SFL was the organising body of the Scottish Football League XI, a select side which represented the SFL in matches against other leagues, including the English Football League, the League of Ireland, the Northern Irish league and the Italian Serie A. These matches began in 1892, soon after the foundation of the SFL. Before the Second World War, inter-league matches were only second in importance to Scotland international matches. After the war, however, the inter-league matches became less important as European club football was instituted and clubs withdrew players due to fixture congestion. The last inter-league match was played in 1980, while a Scottish Football League XI was last selected in 1990 for a match against the Scotland national team to mark the centenary of the SFL.

== See also ==
- List of footballers in Scotland by number of league appearances (also includes successor league systems)
- List of footballers in Scotland by number of league goals (also includes successor league systems)
- List of Scottish Football League stadiums
- Scottish Women's Football League
