= 2001–02 Scottish Football League =

Scottish football season

Statistics of the Scottish Football League in season 2001–02.

== Scottish First Division ==
Pos	Team	Pld	W	D	L	GF	GA	GD	Pts	Promotion or relegation
1	Partick Thistle (C, P)	36	19	9	8	61	38	+23	66	Promotion to the Premier League
2	Airdrieonians (R)	36	15	11	10	59	40	+19	56	Club folded after the season
3	Ayr United	36	13	13	10	53	44	+9	52	
4	Ross County	36	14	10	12	51	43	+8	52	
5	Clyde	36	13	10	13	51	56	−5	49	
6	Inverness CT	36	13	9	14	60	51	+9	48	
7	Arbroath	36	14	6	16	42	59	−17	48	
8	St Mirren	36	11	12	13	43	53	−10	45	
9	Falkirk (Note: Falkirk were reprieved from relegation due to Airdrieonians folding.)	36	10	9	17	49	73	−24	39	
10	Raith Rovers (R)	36	8	11	17	50	62	−12	35	Relegation to the Second Division

Source: "2001-2002 First Division - SPFL Archive". SPFL.
Rules for classification: 1) points; 2) goal difference; 3) number of goals scored.
(C) Champions; (P) Promoted; (R) Relegated

== Scottish Second Division ==
Pos	Team	Pld	W	D	L	GF	GA	GD	Pts	Promotion or relegation
1	Queen of the South (C, P)	36	20	7	9	64	42	+22	67	Promotion to the First Division
2	Alloa Athletic (P)	36	15	14	7	55	33	+22	59	Promotion to the First Division
3	Forfar Athletic	36	15	8	13	51	47	+4	53	
4	Clydebank (Note: Clydebank folded at the end of the season; their place in the Scottish Football League was subsequently purchased by Airdrie United for the following season.)	36	14	9	13	44	45	−1	51	Club folded after the season
5	Hamilton Academical	36	13	9	14	49	44	+5	48	
6	Berwick Rangers	36	12	11	13	44	52	−8	47	
7	Stranraer	36	10	15	11	48	51	−3	45	
8	Cowdenbeath	36	11	11	14	49	51	−2	44	
9	Stenhousemuir (Note: Stenhousemuir were reprieved from relegation due to Aidrieonians folding.)	36	8	12	16	33	57	−24	36	
10	Greenock Morton (R)	36	7	14	15	48	63	−15	35	Relegation to the Third Division

Source: "2001-2002 Second Division - SPFL Archive". SPFL.
Rules for classification: 1) points; 2) goal difference; 3) number of goals scored.
(C) Champions; (P) Promoted; (R) Relegated

== Scottish Third Division ==
Pos	Team	Pld	W	D	L	GF	GA	GD	Pts	Promotion
1	Brechin City (C, P)	36	22	7	7	67	38	+29	73	Promotion to the Second Division
2	Dumbarton (P)	36	18	7	11	59	48	+11	61	Promotion to the Second Division
3	Albion Rovers	36	16	11	9	51	32	+19	59	
4	Peterhead	36	17	5	14	63	52	+11	56	
5	Montrose	36	16	7	13	43	39	+4	55	
6	Elgin City	36	13	8	15	45	47	−2	47	
7	East Stirlingshire	36	12	4	20	51	58	−7	40	
8	East Fife	36	11	7	18	39	56	−17	40	
9	Stirling Albion	36	9	10	17	45	68	−23	37	
10	Queen's Park	36	9	8	19	38	53	−15	35	

Source: "2001-2002 Third Division - SPFL Archive". SPFL.
Rules for classification: 1) points; 2) goal difference; 3) number of goals scored.
(C) Champions; (P) Promoted

== See also ==
- 2001–02 in Scottish football
