= 1989–90 Scottish Football League =

Scottish football season

Statistics of the Scottish Football League in season 1989–90.

== Scottish Premier Division ==
Pos	Team	Pld	W	D	L	GF	GA	GD	Pts	Qualification or relegation
1	Rangers (C)	36	20	11	5	48	19	+29	51	Qualification for the European Cup first round
2	Aberdeen	36	17	10	9	56	33	+23	44	Qualification for the Cup Winners' Cup first round
3	Heart of Midlothian	36	16	12	8	54	35	+19	44	Qualification for the UEFA Cup first round
4	Dundee United	36	11	13	12	36	39	−3	35	Qualification for the UEFA Cup first round
5	Celtic	36	10	14	12	37	37	0	34	
6	Motherwell	36	11	12	13	43	47	−4	34	
7	Hibernian	36	12	10	14	34	41	−7	34	
8	Dunfermline Athletic	36	11	8	17	37	50	−13	30	
9	St Mirren	36	10	10	16	28	48	−20	30	
10	Dundee (R)	36	5	14	17	41	65	−24	24	Relegation to the 1990–91 Scottish First Division

Source: RSSSF
Rules for classification: 1) points; 2) goal difference; 3) number of goals scored.
(C) Champions; (R) Relegated

== Scottish First Division ==
Pos	Team	Pld	W	D	L	GF	GA	GD	Pts	Promotion or relegation
1	St Johnstone (C, P)	39	25	8	6	81	39	+42	58	Promotion to the Premier Division
2	Airdrieonians	39	23	8	8	77	45	+32	54	
3	Clydebank	39	17	10	12	74	64	+10	44	
4	Falkirk	39	14	15	10	59	46	+13	43	
5	Raith Rovers	39	15	12	12	57	50	+7	42	
6	Hamilton Academical	39	14	13	12	52	53	−1	41	
7	Meadowbank Thistle	39	13	13	13	41	46	−5	39	
8	Partick Thistle	39	12	14	13	62	53	+9	38	
9	Clyde	39	10	15	14	39	46	−7	35	
10	Ayr United	39	11	13	15	41	62	−21	35	
11	Morton	39	9	16	14	38	46	−8	34	
12	Forfar Athletic	39	8	15	16	51	65	−14	29 (Note: 2 points deducted)	
13	Albion Rovers (R)	39	8	11	20	50	78	−28	27	Relegation to the Second Division
14	Alloa Athletic (R)	39	6	13	20	41	70	−29	25	Relegation to the Second Division

Source: RSSSF and statto
Rules for classification: 1) points; 2) goal difference; 3) number of goals scored.
(C) Champions; (P) Promoted; (R) Relegated

== Scottish Second Division ==
Pos	Team	Pld	W	D	L	GF	GA	GD	Pts	Promotion
1	Brechin City (C, P)	39	19	11	9	59	44	+15	49	Promotion to the First Division
2	Kilmarnock (P)	39	21	5	13	67	41	+26	47	Promotion to the First Division
3	Stirling Albion	39	20	7	12	73	50	+23	47	
4	Stenhousemuir	39	18	9	12	62	53	+9	45	
5	Berwick Rangers	39	18	5	16	66	57	+9	41	
6	Dumbarton	39	15	10	14	70	73	−3	40	
7	Cowdenbeath	39	13	13	13	58	54	+4	39	
8	Stranraer	39	15	8	16	57	59	−2	38	
9	East Fife	39	12	12	15	60	63	−3	36	
10	Queen of the South	39	11	14	14	58	69	−11	36	
11	Queen's Park	39	13	10	16	40	51	−11	36	
12	Arbroath	39	12	10	17	47	61	−14	34	
13	Montrose	39	10	12	17	53	63	−10	32	
14	East Stirlingshire	39	8	10	21	34	66	−32	26	

Source: "1989-1990 Second Division - SPFL Archive". SPFL.
Rules for classification: 1) points; 2) goal difference; 3) number of goals scored.
(C) Champions; (P) Promoted

== See also ==
- 1989–90 in Scottish football
