= 1995–96 Scottish Third Division =

Scottish Third Division
- Season: 1995–96
- Champions: Livingston
- Promoted: Livingston; Brechin City
- Relegated: n/a
- Matches: 180
- Goals: 459 (2.55 per match)
- Biggest home win: Caledonian Thistle 6–1 Albion Rovers (21 October 1995)
- Biggest away win: Alloa Athletic 0–5 Caledonian Thistle (23 September 1995); East Stirlingshire 0–5 Caledonian Thistle (7 October 1995)
- Highest scoring: (7 goals); Caledonian Thistle 6–1 Albion Rovers (21 October 1995); Albion Rovers 3–4 Ross County (4 November 1995)
- Longest winning run: 7 games Livingston
- Longest unbeaten run: 15 games Livingston; Ross County
- Longest winless run: 15 games Alloa Athletic
- Longest losing run: 5 games Alloa Athletic; East Stirlingshire

The 1995–96 Scottish Football League Third Division was the 2nd season in the format of ten teams in the fourth-tier of Scottish football. The season started on 11 August 1995 and ended on 3 May 1996. Livingston F.C. finished top and were promoted alongside runners-up Brechin City. Both teams were promoted straight back to the Second Division having both been relegated the previous season. Albion Rovers finished bottom for a second consecutive season.

== Teams for 1995–96 ==
Location of teams in 1995–96 Scottish Third Division

Forfar Athletic as champions of the previous season were directly promoted to the 1995–96 Scottish Second Division alongside runners-up Montrose. They were replaced by Meadowbank Thistle and Brechin City who finished second bottom and bottom of the 1994–95 Scottish Second Division respectively. During the change of season Meadowbank Thistle relocated to and changed their name to Livingston for the 1995–96 season.

=== Overview ===
Relegated from Second Division to the Third Division

- Meadowbank Thistle (became Livingston)
- Brechin City

== Stadia and locations ==
| Team | Location | Stadium |
|---|---|---|
| Albion Rovers | Coatbridge | Cliftonhill |
| Alloa Athletic | Alloa | Recreation Park |
| Arbroath | Arbroath | Gayfield Park |
| Brechin City | Brechin | Glebe Park |
| Caledonian Thistle | Inverness | Telford Street Park |
| Cowdenbeath | Cowdenbeath | Central Park |
| East Stirlingshire | Falkirk | Firs Park |
| Livingston | Livingston | Almondvale Stadium |
| Queen's Park | Glasgow | Hampden Park |
| Ross County | Dingwall | Victoria Park |

== Table ==
| Pos | Team | Pld | W | D | L | GF | GA | GD | Pts | Promotion |
|---|---|---|---|---|---|---|---|---|---|---|
| 1 | Livingston (C, P) | 36 | 21 | 9 | 6 | 51 | 24 | +27 | 72 | Promotion to the Second Division |
| 2 | Brechin City (P) | 36 | 18 | 9 | 9 | 41 | 21 | +20 | 63 | Promotion to the Second Division |
| 3 | Caledonian Thistle | 36 | 15 | 12 | 9 | 64 | 38 | +26 | 57 | |
| 4 | Ross County | 36 | 12 | 17 | 7 | 56 | 39 | +17 | 53 | |
| 5 | Arbroath | 36 | 13 | 13 | 10 | 41 | 41 | 0 | 52 | |
| 6 | Queen's Park | 36 | 12 | 12 | 12 | 40 | 43 | −3 | 48 | |
| 7 | East Stirlingshire | 36 | 11 | 11 | 14 | 58 | 62 | −4 | 44 | |
| 8 | Cowdenbeath | 36 | 10 | 8 | 18 | 45 | 59 | −14 | 38 | |
| 9 | Alloa Athletic | 36 | 6 | 11 | 19 | 26 | 58 | −32 | 29 | |
| 10 | Albion Rovers | 36 | 7 | 8 | 21 | 37 | 74 | −37 | 29 | |

Source: Soccerway
Rules for classification: 1) points; 2) goal difference; 3) number of goals scored.
(C) Champions; (P) Promoted
