= 1993–94 Scottish Football League =

Scottish football season

Statistics of the Scottish Football League in season 1993–94.

== Scottish Premier Division ==
Pos	Team	Pld	W	D	L	GF	GA	GD	Pts	Qualification or relegation
1	Rangers (C)	44	22	14	8	74	41	+33	58	Qualification for the Champions League qualifying round
2	Aberdeen	44	17	21	6	58	36	+22	55	Qualification for the UEFA Cup preliminary round
3	Motherwell	44	20	14	10	58	43	+15	54	Qualification for the UEFA Cup preliminary round
4	Celtic	44	15	20	9	51	38	+13	50	
5	Hibernian	44	16	15	13	53	48	+5	47	
6	Dundee United	44	11	20	13	47	48	−1	42	Qualification for the Cup Winners' Cup first round
7	Heart of Midlothian	44	11	20	13	37	43	−6	42	
8	Kilmarnock	44	12	16	16	36	45	−9	40	
9	Partick Thistle	44	12	16	16	46	57	−11	40	
10	St Johnstone (R)	44	10	20	14	35	47	−12	40	Relegation to the 1994–95 Scottish First Division
11	Raith Rovers (R)	44	6	19	19	46	80	−34	31	Relegation to the 1994–95 Scottish First Division
12	Dundee (R)	44	8	13	23	42	57	−15	29	Relegation to the 1994–95 Scottish First Division

Source: RSSSF
Rules for classification: 1) points; 2) goal difference; 3) number of goals scored.
(C) Champions; (R) Relegated

== Scottish First Division ==
Pos	Team	Pld	W	D	L	GF	GA	GD	Pts	Promotion or relegation
1	Falkirk (C, P)	44	26	14	4	81	32	+49	66	Promotion to the Premier Division
2	Dunfermline Athletic	44	29	7	8	93	35	+58	65	
3	Airdrieonians	44	20	14	10	58	38	+20	54	
4	Hamilton Academical	44	19	12	13	66	54	+12	50	
5	Clydebank	44	18	14	12	56	48	+8	50	
6	St Mirren	44	21	8	15	42	48	−6	50	
7	Ayr United	44	14	14	16	42	52	−10	42	
8	Dumbarton (R)	44	11	14	19	48	59	−11	36	Relegation to the Second Division
9	Stirling Albion (R)	44	13	9	22	41	68	−27	35	Relegation to the Second Division
10	Clyde (R)	44	10	12	22	35	58	−23	32	Relegation to the Second Division
11	Morton (R)	44	6	17	21	44	75	−31	29	Relegation to the Second Division
12	Brechin City (R)	44	6	7	31	30	81	−51	19	Relegation to the Second Division

Source: RSSSF and statto
Rules for classification: 1) points; 2) goal difference; 3) number of goals scored.
(C) Champions; (P) Promoted; (R) Relegated

== Scottish Second Division ==
Pos	Team	Pld	W	D	L	GF	GA	GD	Pts	Promotion or relegation
1	Stranraer (C, P)	39	23	10	6	63	35	+28	56	Promotion to the First Division
2	Berwick Rangers	39	18	12	9	75	46	+29	48	
3	Stenhousemuir	39	19	9	11	62	44	+18	47	
4	Meadowbank Thistle	39	17	13	9	62	48	+14	47	
5	Queen of the South	39	17	9	13	69	48	+21	43	
6	East Fife	39	15	11	13	58	52	+6	41	
7	Alloa Athletic (R)	39	12	17	10	41	39	+2	41	Relegation to the Third Division
8	Forfar Athletic (R)	39	14	11	14	58	58	0	39	Relegation to the Third Division
9	East Stirlingshire (R)	39	13	11	15	54	57	−3	37	Relegation to the Third Division
10	Montrose (R)	39	14	8	17	56	61	−5	36	Relegation to the Third Division
11	Queen's Park (R)	39	12	10	17	52	76	−24	34	Relegation to the Third Division
12	Arbroath (R)	39	12	9	18	42	67	−25	33	Relegation to the Third Division
13	Albion Rovers (R)	39	7	10	22	37	66	−29	24	Relegation to the Third Division
14	Cowdenbeath (R)	39	6	8	25	40	72	−32	20	Relegation to the Third Division

Rules for classification: 1) points; 2) goal difference; 3) number of goals scored.
(C) Champions; (P) Promoted; (R) Relegated

== See also ==
- 1993–94 in Scottish football
