= 1998–99 Scottish Football League =

Scottish football season

Statistics of the Scottish Football League in season 1998–99.

== Scottish First Division ==
Pos	Team	Pld	W	D	L	GF	GA	GD	Pts	Promotion or relegation
1	Hibernian (C, P)	36	28	5	3	84	33	+51	89	Promotion to the Premier League
2	Falkirk	36	20	6	10	60	38	+22	66	
3	Ayr United	36	19	5	12	66	42	+24	62	
4	Airdrieonians	36	18	5	13	42	43	−1	59	
5	St Mirren	36	14	10	12	42	43	−1	52	
6	Morton	36	14	7	15	45	41	+4	49	
7	Clydebank	36	11	13	12	36	38	−2	46	
8	Raith Rovers	36	8	11	17	37	57	−20	35	
9	Hamilton Academical (R)	36	6	10	20	30	62	−32	28	Relegation to the Second Division
10	Stranraer (R)	36	5	2	29	29	74	−45	17	Relegation to the Second Division

Source: "1998-1999 First Division - SPFL Archive". SPFL.
Rules for classification: 1) points; 2) goal difference; 3) number of goals scored.
(C) Champions; (P) Promoted; (R) Relegated

== Scottish Second Division ==
Pos	Team	Pld	W	D	L	GF	GA	GD	Pts	Promotion or relegation
1	Livingston (C, P)	36	22	11	3	64	35	+29	77	Promotion to the First Division
2	Inverness CT (P)	36	21	9	6	80	48	+32	72	Promotion to the First Division
3	Clyde	36	15	8	13	46	42	+4	53	
4	Queen of the South	36	13	9	14	50	45	+5	48	
5	Alloa Athletic	36	13	7	16	65	56	+9	46	
6	Stirling Albion	36	12	8	16	50	63	−13	44	
7	Arbroath	36	12	8	16	37	52	−15	44	
8	Partick Thistle	36	12	7	17	36	45	−9	43	
9	East Fife (R)	36	12	6	18	42	64	−22	42	Relegation to the Third Division
10	Forfar Athletic (R)	36	8	7	21	48	68	−20	31	Relegation to the Third Division

Source: "1998-1999 Second Division - SPFL Archive". SPFL.
Rules for classification: 1) points; 2) goal difference; 3) number of goals scored.
(C) Champions; (P) Promoted; (R) Relegated

== Scottish Third Division ==
Pos	Team	Pld	W	D	L	GF	GA	GD	Pts	Promotion
1	Ross County (C, P)	36	24	5	7	87	42	+45	77	Promotion to the Second Division
2	Stenhousemuir (P)	36	19	7	10	62	42	+20	64	Promotion to the Second Division
3	Brechin City	36	17	7	12	47	44	+3	58	
4	Dumbarton	36	16	9	11	53	40	+13	57	
5	Berwick Rangers	36	12	14	10	53	49	+4	50	
6	Queen's Park	36	11	11	14	41	46	−5	44	
7	Albion Rovers	36	12	8	16	43	63	−20	44	
8	East Stirlingshire	36	9	13	14	50	48	+2	40	
9	Cowdenbeath	36	9	6	21	35	65	−30	33	
10	Montrose	36	8	6	22	42	74	−32	30	

Source: "1998-1999 Third Division - SPFL Archive". SPFL.
Rules for classification: 1) points; 2) goal difference; 3) number of goals scored.
(C) Champions; (P) Promoted

== See also ==
- 1998–99 in Scottish football
