= 1995–96 Scottish Football League =

Scottish football season

Statistics of the Scottish Football League in season 1995–96.

== Scottish Premier Division ==
Pos	Team	Pld	W	D	L	GF	GA	GD	Pts	Qualification or relegation
1	Rangers (C)	36	27	6	3	85	25	+60	87	Qualification for the Champions League qualifying round
2	Celtic	36	24	11	1	74	25	+49	83	Qualification for the UEFA Cup qualifying round (Note: Aberdeen qualified for the UEFA Cup by winning the League Cup.)
3	Aberdeen	36	16	7	13	52	45	+7	55	Qualification for the UEFA Cup qualifying round
4	Heart of Midlothian	36	16	7	13	55	53	+2	55	Qualification for the Cup Winners' Cup qualifying round (Note: As Rangers, the winners of the Scottish Cup, qualified for the Champions League via their league position, the place in the Cup Winners' Cup was passed to the cup runner-up, Heart of Midlothian.)
5	Hibernian	36	11	10	15	43	57	−14	43	
6	Raith Rovers	36	12	7	17	41	57	−16	43	
7	Kilmarnock	36	11	8	17	39	54	−15	41	
8	Motherwell	36	9	12	15	28	39	−11	39	
9	Partick Thistle (R)	36	8	6	22	29	62	−33	30	Qualification for the Play-off
10	Falkirk (R)	36	6	6	24	31	60	−29	24	Relegation to the First Division

Source: Soccerbase
Rules for classification: 1) Points; 2) Goal difference; 3) Goals scored
(C) Champions; (R) Relegated

== Scottish League Division One ==
Pos	Team	Pld	W	D	L	GF	GA	GD	Pts	Promotion or relegation
1	Dunfermline Athletic (C, P)	36	21	8	7	73	41	+32	71	Promotion to the Premier Division
2	Dundee United (P)	36	19	10	7	73	37	+36	67	Qualification for the Play-off
3	Greenock Morton	36	20	7	9	57	39	+18	67	
4	St Johnstone	36	19	8	9	60	36	+24	65	
5	Dundee	36	15	12	9	53	40	+13	57	
6	St Mirren	36	13	8	15	46	51	−5	47	
7	Clydebank	36	10	10	16	39	58	−19	40	
8	Airdrieonians	36	9	11	16	43	54	−11	38	
9	Hamilton Academical (R)	36	10	6	20	40	57	−17	36	Relegation to the Second Division
10	Dumbarton (R)	36	3	2	31	23	94	−71	11	Relegation to the Second Division

Source: RSSSF
Rules for classification: 1) points; 2) goal difference; 3) number of goals scored.
(C) Champions; (P) Promoted; (R) Relegated

== Scottish League Division Two ==
Pos	Team	Pld	W	D	L	GF	GA	GD	Pts	Promotion or relegation
1	Stirling Albion (C, P)	36	24	9	3	83	30	+53	81	Promotion to the First Division
2	East Fife (P)	36	19	10	7	50	29	+21	67	Promotion to the First Division
3	Berwick Rangers	36	18	6	12	64	47	+17	60	
4	Stenhousemuir	36	14	7	15	51	49	+2	49	
5	Clyde	36	11	12	13	47	45	+2	45	
6	Ayr United	36	11	12	13	40	40	0	45	
7	Queen of the South	36	11	10	15	54	67	−13	43	
8	Stranraer	36	8	18	10	38	43	−5	42	
9	Forfar Athletic (R)	36	11	7	18	37	61	−24	40	Relegation to the Third Division
10	Montrose (R)	36	5	5	26	33	86	−53	20	Relegation to the Third Division

Rules for classification: 1) points; 2) goal difference; 3) number of goals scored.
(C) Champions; (P) Promoted; (R) Relegated

== Scottish League Division Three ==
Pos	Team	Pld	W	D	L	GF	GA	GD	Pts	Promotion
1	Livingston (C, P)	36	21	9	6	51	24	+27	72	Promotion to the Second Division
2	Brechin City (P)	36	18	9	9	41	21	+20	63	Promotion to the Second Division
3	Caledonian Thistle	36	15	12	9	64	38	+26	57	
4	Ross County	36	12	17	7	56	39	+17	53	
5	Arbroath	36	13	13	10	41	41	0	52	
6	Queen's Park	36	12	12	12	40	43	−3	48	
7	East Stirlingshire	36	11	11	14	58	62	−4	44	
8	Cowdenbeath	36	10	8	18	45	59	−14	38	
9	Alloa Athletic	36	6	11	19	26	58	−32	29	
10	Albion Rovers	36	7	8	21	37	74	−37	29	

Source: Soccerway
Rules for classification: 1) points; 2) goal difference; 3) number of goals scored.
(C) Champions; (P) Promoted

== See also ==
- 1995–96 in Scottish football
