= 1996–97 Scottish Football League =

Scottish football season

Statistics of the Scottish Football League in season 1996–97.

== Scottish Premier Division ==
| Pos | Team | Pld | W | D | L | GF | GA | GD | Pts | Qualification or relegation |
|---|---|---|---|---|---|---|---|---|---|---|
| 1 | Rangers (C) | 36 | 25 | 5 | 6 | 85 | 33 | +52 | 80 | Qualification for the Champions League first qualifying round |
| 2 | Celtic | 36 | 23 | 6 | 7 | 78 | 32 | +46 | 75 | Qualification for the UEFA Cup first qualifying round (Note: As the League Cup winners Rangers had qualified for European competition via their league position, the place in the UEFA Cup was passed to the next highest placed team in the league, Dundee United.) |
| 3 | Dundee United | 36 | 17 | 9 | 10 | 46 | 33 | +13 | 60 | Qualification for the UEFA Cup first qualifying round |
| 4 | Heart of Midlothian | 36 | 14 | 10 | 12 | 46 | 43 | +3 | 52 | |
| 5 | Dunfermline Athletic | 36 | 12 | 9 | 15 | 52 | 65 | −13 | 45 | |
| 6 | Aberdeen | 36 | 10 | 14 | 12 | 45 | 54 | −9 | 44 | |
| 7 | Kilmarnock | 36 | 11 | 6 | 19 | 41 | 61 | −20 | 39 | Qualification for the Cup Winners' Cup qualifying round (Note: Kilmarnock qualified for the Cup Winners' Cup as the winners of the Scottish Cup.) |
| 8 | Motherwell | 36 | 9 | 11 | 16 | 44 | 55 | −11 | 38 | |
| 9 | Hibernian (O) | 36 | 9 | 11 | 16 | 38 | 55 | −17 | 38 | Qualification for the Play-off |
| 10 | Raith Rovers (R) | 36 | 6 | 7 | 23 | 29 | 73 | −44 | 25 | Relegation to the First Division |

Source: Soccerbase
Rules for classification: 1) Points; 2) Goal difference; 3) Goals scored
(C) Champions; (O) Play-off winners; (R) Relegated

== Scottish League Division One ==
| Pos | Team | Pld | W | D | L | GF | GA | GD | Pts | Promotion or relegation |
|---|---|---|---|---|---|---|---|---|---|---|
| 1 | St Johnstone (C, P) | 36 | 24 | 8 | 4 | 74 | 23 | +51 | 80 | Promotion to the Premier Division |
| 2 | Airdrieonians | 36 | 15 | 15 | 6 | 56 | 34 | +22 | 60 | Qualification for the Play-off |
| 3 | Dundee | 36 | 15 | 13 | 8 | 47 | 33 | +14 | 58 | |
| 4 | St Mirren | 36 | 17 | 7 | 12 | 48 | 41 | +7 | 58 | |
| 5 | Falkirk | 36 | 15 | 9 | 12 | 42 | 39 | +3 | 54 | |
| 6 | Partick Thistle | 36 | 12 | 12 | 12 | 49 | 48 | +1 | 48 | |
| 7 | Stirling Albion | 36 | 12 | 10 | 14 | 54 | 61 | −7 | 46 | |
| 8 | Morton | 36 | 12 | 9 | 15 | 42 | 41 | +1 | 45 | |
| 9 | Clydebank (R) | 36 | 7 | 7 | 22 | 31 | 59 | −28 | 28 | Relegation to the Second Division |
| 10 | East Fife (R) | 36 | 2 | 8 | 26 | 28 | 92 | −64 | 14 | Relegation to the Second Division |

Source: RSSSF
Rules for classification: 1) points; 2) goal difference; 3) number of goals scored.
(C) Champions; (P) Promoted; (R) Relegated

== Scottish League Division Two ==
| Pos | Team | Pld | W | D | L | GF | GA | GD | Pts | Promotion or relegation |
|---|---|---|---|---|---|---|---|---|---|---|
| 1 | Ayr United (C, P) | 36 | 23 | 8 | 5 | 61 | 33 | +28 | 77 | Promotion to the First Division |
| 2 | Hamilton Academical (P) | 36 | 22 | 8 | 6 | 75 | 28 | +47 | 74 | Promotion to the First Division |
| 3 | Livingston | 36 | 18 | 10 | 8 | 56 | 38 | +18 | 64 | |
| 4 | Clyde | 36 | 14 | 10 | 12 | 42 | 39 | +3 | 52 | |
| 5 | Queen of the South | 36 | 13 | 8 | 15 | 55 | 57 | −2 | 47 | |
| 6 | Stenhousemuir | 36 | 11 | 11 | 14 | 49 | 43 | +6 | 44 | |
| 7 | Brechin City | 36 | 10 | 11 | 15 | 36 | 49 | −13 | 41 | |
| 8 | Stranraer | 36 | 9 | 9 | 18 | 29 | 51 | −22 | 36 | |
| 9 | Dumbarton (R) | 36 | 9 | 8 | 19 | 44 | 66 | −22 | 35 | Relegation to the Third Division |
| 10 | Berwick Rangers (R) | 36 | 4 | 11 | 21 | 32 | 75 | −43 | 23 | Relegation to the Third Division |

Source: "1996-1997 Second Division - SPFL Archive". SPFL.
Rules for classification: 1) points; 2) goal difference; 3) number of goals scored.
(C) Champions; (P) Promoted; (R) Relegated

== Scottish League Division Three ==
| Pos | Team | Pld | W | D | L | GF | GA | GD | Pts | Promotion |
|---|---|---|---|---|---|---|---|---|---|---|
| 1 | Inverness Caledonian Thistle (C, P) | 36 | 23 | 7 | 6 | 70 | 37 | +33 | 76 | Promotion to the Second Division |
| 2 | Forfar Athletic (P) | 36 | 19 | 10 | 7 | 74 | 45 | +29 | 67 | Promotion to the Second Division |
| 3 | Ross County | 36 | 20 | 7 | 9 | 58 | 41 | +17 | 67 | |
| 4 | Alloa Athletic | 36 | 16 | 7 | 13 | 50 | 47 | +3 | 55 | |
| 5 | Albion Rovers | 36 | 13 | 10 | 13 | 50 | 47 | +3 | 49 | |
| 6 | Montrose | 36 | 12 | 7 | 17 | 46 | 62 | −16 | 43 | |
| 7 | Cowdenbeath | 36 | 10 | 9 | 17 | 38 | 51 | −13 | 39 | |
| 8 | Queen's Park | 36 | 9 | 9 | 18 | 46 | 59 | −13 | 36 | |
| 9 | East Stirlingshire | 36 | 8 | 9 | 19 | 36 | 58 | −22 | 33 | |
| 10 | Arbroath | 36 | 6 | 13 | 17 | 31 | 52 | −21 | 31 | |

Source: Soccerway
Rules for classification: 1) points; 2) goal difference; 3) number of goals scored.
(C) Champions; (P) Promoted

== See also ==
- 1996–97 in Scottish football
