= 1999–2000 Scottish Football League =

Football statistics

Statistics of the Scottish Football League in season 1999–2000.

== Scottish First Division ==
=== League table ===
Pos	Team	Pld	W	D	L	GF	GA	GD	Pts	Promotion or relegation
1	St Mirren (C, P)	36	23	7	6	75	39	+36	76	Promotion to the Premier League
2	Dunfermline Athletic (P)	36	20	11	5	66	33	+33	71	Promotion to the Premier League
3	Falkirk	36	20	8	8	67	40	+27	68	
4	Livingston	36	19	7	10	60	45	+15	64	
5	Raith Rovers	36	17	8	11	55	40	+15	59	
6	Inverness CT	36	13	10	13	60	55	+5	49	
7	Ayr United	36	10	8	18	42	52	−10	38	
8	Morton	36	10	6	20	45	61	−16	36	
9	Airdrieonians	36	7	8	21	29	69	−40	29	
10	Clydebank (R)	36	1	7	28	17	82	−65	10	Relegation to the Second Division

Source: "1999-2000 First Division - SPFL Archive". SPFL.
Rules for classification: 1) points; 2) goal difference; 3) number of goals scored.
(C) Champions; (P) Promoted; (R) Relegated

=== Top scorers ===
Player	Club	Goals
(Scotland) Mark Yardley	St Mirren	19
(Scotland) Stevie Crawford	Dunfermline Athletic	16
(Scotland) Barry Lavety	St Mirren	16
(Scotland) Brian McPhee	Livingston	15
(Scotland) David Bingham	Livingston	15
(South Africa) Glynn Hurst	Ayr United	14
(Scotland) Scott Crabbe	Falkirk	14
(Scotland) Barry Wilson	Inverness CT	12
(Scotland) Craig Dargo	Raith Rovers	12
(Scotland) David Nicholls	Falkirk	11

== Scottish Second Division ==
=== League table ===
Pos	Team	Pld	W	D	L	GF	GA	GD	Pts	Promotion or relegation
1	Clyde (C, P)	36	18	11	7	65	37	+28	65	Promotion to the First Division
2	Alloa Athletic (P)	36	17	13	6	58	38	+20	64	Promotion to the First Division
3	Ross County (P)	36	18	8	10	57	39	+18	62	Promotion to the First Division
4	Arbroath	36	11	14	11	52	55	−3	47	
5	Partick Thistle	36	12	10	14	42	44	−2	46	
6	Stranraer	36	9	18	9	47	46	+1	45	
7	Stirling Albion	36	11	7	18	60	72	−12	40	
8	Stenhousemuir	36	10	8	18	44	59	−15	38	
9	Queen of the South	36	8	9	19	45	75	−30	33	
10	Hamilton Academical (R)	36	10	14	12	39	44	−5	29 (Note: 15 points deducted)	Relegation to the Third Division

Source: SPFL Archive
Rules for classification: 1) points; 2) goal difference; 3) number of goals scored.
(C) Champions; (P) Promoted; (R) Relegated

=== Top scorers ===
Scorer	Team	Goals
(Scotland) Brian Carrigan	Clyde	19
(Scotland) Ally Graham	Stirling Albion	17
(Scotland) Martin Cameron	Alloa Athletic	16
(Scotland) Colin McGlashan	Arbroath	15
(Scotland) John McQuade	Stirling Albion	15
(Scotland) Willie Irvine	Alloa Athletic	13
(Scotland) Stevie Mallan	Queen of the South	13
(Scotland) George Shaw	Ross County	13
(Scotland) Pat Keogh	Clyde	11
(Scotland) Paul McGrillen	Stirling Albion	11

== Scottish Third Division ==
Pos	Team	Pld	W	D	L	GF	GA	GD	Pts	Promotion
1	Queen's Park (C, P)	36	20	9	7	54	37	+17	69	Promotion to the Second Division
2	Berwick Rangers (P)	36	19	9	8	53	30	+23	66	Promotion to the Second Division
3	Forfar Athletic (P)	36	17	10	9	64	40	+24	61	Promotion to the Second Division
4	East Fife	36	17	8	11	45	39	+6	59	
5	Cowdenbeath	36	15	9	12	59	43	+16	54	
6	Dumbarton	36	15	8	13	53	51	+2	53	
7	East Stirlingshire	36	11	7	18	28	50	−22	40	
8	Brechin City	36	10	8	18	42	51	−9	38	
9	Montrose	36	10	7	19	39	54	−15	37	
10	Albion Rovers	36	5	7	24	33	75	−42	22	

Source: "1999-2000 Third Division - SPFL Archive". SPFL (in Malay).
Rules for classification: 1) points; 2) goal difference; 3) number of goals scored.
(C) Champions; (P) Promoted

== See also ==
- 1999–00 in Scottish football
