= 1997–98 Scottish Football League =

Scottish football season

Statistics of the Scottish Football League in season 1997–98.

== Scottish Premier Division ==
=== Table ===
| Pos | Team | Pld | W | D | L | GF | GA | GD | Pts | Qualification or relegation |
|---|---|---|---|---|---|---|---|---|---|---|
| 1 | Celtic (C) | 36 | 22 | 8 | 6 | 64 | 24 | +40 | 74 | Qualification for the Champions League first qualifying round |
| 2 | Rangers | 36 | 21 | 9 | 6 | 76 | 38 | +38 | 72 | Qualification for the UEFA Cup first qualifying round |
| 3 | Heart of Midlothian | 36 | 19 | 10 | 7 | 70 | 46 | +24 | 67 | Qualification for the Cup Winners' Cup qualifying round |
| 4 | Kilmarnock | 36 | 13 | 11 | 12 | 40 | 52 | −12 | 50 | Qualification for the UEFA Cup first qualifying round |
| 5 | St Johnstone | 36 | 13 | 9 | 14 | 38 | 42 | −4 | 48 | |
| 6 | Aberdeen | 36 | 9 | 12 | 15 | 39 | 53 | −14 | 39 | |
| 7 | Dundee United | 36 | 8 | 13 | 15 | 43 | 51 | −8 | 37 | |
| 8 | Dunfermline Athletic | 36 | 8 | 13 | 15 | 43 | 68 | −25 | 37 | |
| 9 | Motherwell | 36 | 9 | 7 | 20 | 46 | 64 | −18 | 34 | |
| 10 | Hibernian (R) | 36 | 6 | 12 | 18 | 38 | 59 | −21 | 30 | Relegation to the First Division |

Source: Rec.Sport.Soccer Statistics Foundation
Rules for classification: 1) Points; 2) Goal difference; 3) Goals scored
(C) Champions; (R) Relegated

=== Top scorers ===
| Player | Goals | Team |
|---|---|---|
| (Italy) Marco Negri | 32 | Rangers |
| (Sweden) Kjell Olofsson | 18 | Dundee United |
| (Sweden) Henrik Larsson | 16 | Celtic |
| (Scotland) Andy Smith | 16 | Dunfermline Athletic |
| (Republic of Ireland) Tommy Coyne | 14 | Motherwell |
| (Scotland) Jim Hamilton | 14 | Heart of Midlothian |
| (Republic of Ireland) Owen Coyle | 11 | Motherwell |
| (Germany) Jörg Albertz | 10 | Rangers |
| (Scotland) Craig Burley | 10 | Celtic |
| (Scotland) Billy Dodds | 10 | Aberdeen |
| (Scotland) Simon Donnelly | 10 | Celtic |
| (Scotland) Neil McCann | 10 | Heart of Midlothian |
| (Northern Ireland) George O'Boyle | 10 | St Johnstone |
| (Scotland) Paul Wright | 10 | Kilmarnock |

Source: Soccerbot

== Scottish League Division One ==
=== Table ===
| Pos | Team | Pld | W | D | L | GF | GA | GD | Pts | Promotion or relegation |
|---|---|---|---|---|---|---|---|---|---|---|
| 1 | Dundee (C, P) | 36 | 20 | 10 | 6 | 52 | 24 | +28 | 70 | Promotion to the Premier League |
| 2 | Falkirk | 36 | 19 | 8 | 9 | 56 | 41 | +15 | 65 | |
| 3 | Raith Rovers | 36 | 17 | 9 | 10 | 51 | 33 | +18 | 60 | |
| 4 | Airdrieonians | 36 | 16 | 12 | 8 | 42 | 35 | +7 | 60 | |
| 5 | Greenock Morton | 36 | 12 | 10 | 14 | 40 | 47 | −7 | 46 | |
| 6 | St Mirren | 36 | 11 | 8 | 17 | 41 | 53 | −12 | 41 | |
| 7 | Ayr United | 36 | 10 | 10 | 16 | 40 | 56 | −16 | 40 | |
| 8 | Hamilton Academical | 36 | 9 | 11 | 16 | 43 | 56 | −13 | 38 | |
| 9 | Partick Thistle (R) | 36 | 8 | 12 | 16 | 45 | 55 | −10 | 36 | Relegation to the Second Division |
| 10 | Stirling Albion (R) | 36 | 8 | 10 | 18 | 40 | 56 | −16 | 34 | Relegation to the Second Division |

Source: RSSSF
Rules for classification: 1) points; 2) goal difference; 3) number of goals scored.
(C) Champions; (P) Promoted; (R) Relegated

=== Top scorers ===
| P | Name | Goals |
|---|---|---|
| 1 | (Scotland) James Grady (Dundee) | 15 |
| 2 | (Scotland) Alex Bone (Stirling Albion) | 13 |
| 3 | (Scotland) Eddie Annand (Dundee) | 12 |
| = | (Scotland) Brian McPhee (Airdrieonians) | 12 |
| = | (England) David Moss (Falkirk) | 12 |
| 6 | (England) Stephen Cooper (Airdrieonians) | 11 |
| 7 | (Benin) Laurent D'Jaffo (Ayr United) | 10 |
| = | (Scotland) Paul Hartley (Raith Rovers) | 10 |
| = | (England) Warren Hawke (Morton) | 10 |
| = | (Scotland) Marino Keith (Falkirk) | 10 |

== Scottish League Division Two ==
=== Table ===
| Pos | Team | Pld | W | D | L | GF | GA | GD | Pts | Promotion or relegation |
|---|---|---|---|---|---|---|---|---|---|---|
| 1 | Stranraer (C, P) | 36 | 18 | 7 | 11 | 62 | 44 | +18 | 61 | Promotion to the First Division |
| 2 | Clydebank (P) | 36 | 16 | 12 | 8 | 48 | 31 | +17 | 60 | Promotion to the First Division |
| 3 | Livingston | 36 | 16 | 11 | 9 | 56 | 40 | +16 | 59 | |
| 4 | Queen of the South | 36 | 15 | 9 | 12 | 57 | 51 | +6 | 54 | |
| 5 | Inverness CT | 36 | 13 | 10 | 13 | 65 | 51 | +14 | 49 | |
| 6 | East Fife | 36 | 14 | 6 | 16 | 51 | 59 | −8 | 48 | |
| 7 | Forfar Athletic | 36 | 12 | 10 | 14 | 51 | 61 | −10 | 46 | |
| 8 | Clyde | 36 | 10 | 12 | 14 | 40 | 53 | −13 | 42 | |
| 9 | Stenhousemuir (R) | 36 | 10 | 10 | 16 | 44 | 53 | −9 | 40 | Relegation to the Third Division |
| 10 | Brechin City (R) | 36 | 7 | 11 | 18 | 42 | 73 | −31 | 32 | Relegation to the Third Division |

Source: "1997-1998 Second Division - SPFL Archive". SPFL (in Malay).
Rules for classification: 1) points; 2) goal difference; 3) number of goals scored.
(C) Champions; (P) Promoted; (R) Relegated

=== Top scorers ===
| P | Name | Goals |
|---|---|---|
| 1 | (Scotland) Iain Stewart (Inverness CT) | 16 |
| 2 | (Scotland) Graham Harvey (Livingston) | 15 |
| = | (Scotland) Ian Little (Stenhousemuir) | 15 |
| 4 | (Scotland) Martin McLauchan (Forfar Athletic) | 14 |
| 5 | (Scotland) Colin McDonald (Clydebank) | 13 |
| = | (Scotland) B Thomson (Inverness CT) | 13 |
| 7 | (Australia) Ben Honeyman (Forfar Athletic) | 12 |
| 8 | (Scotland) Tommy Bryce (Queen of the South) | 11 |
| = | (Scotland) Matthew Dyer (East Fife) | 11 |
| = | (Scotland) Gordon Young (Stranraer) | 11 |

== Scottish League Division Three ==
| Pos | Team | Pld | W | D | L | GF | GA | GD | Pts | Promotion |
|---|---|---|---|---|---|---|---|---|---|---|
| 1 | Alloa Athletic (C, P) | 36 | 24 | 4 | 8 | 78 | 39 | +39 | 76 | Promotion to the Second Division |
| 2 | Arbroath (P) | 36 | 20 | 8 | 8 | 67 | 39 | +28 | 68 | Promotion to the Second Division |
| 3 | Ross County | 36 | 19 | 10 | 7 | 71 | 36 | +35 | 67 | |
| 4 | East Stirlingshire | 36 | 17 | 6 | 13 | 50 | 48 | +2 | 57 | |
| 5 | Albion Rovers | 36 | 13 | 5 | 18 | 60 | 73 | −13 | 44 | |
| 6 | Berwick Rangers | 36 | 10 | 12 | 14 | 47 | 55 | −8 | 42 | |
| 7 | Queen's Park | 36 | 10 | 11 | 15 | 42 | 55 | −13 | 41 | |
| 8 | Cowdenbeath | 36 | 12 | 2 | 22 | 33 | 57 | −24 | 38 | |
| 9 | Montrose | 36 | 10 | 8 | 18 | 53 | 80 | −27 | 38 | |
| 10 | Dumbarton | 36 | 7 | 10 | 19 | 42 | 61 | −19 | 31 | |

Source: Soccerway
Rules for classification: 1) points; 2) goal difference; 3) number of goals scored.
(C) Champions; (P) Promoted

== See also ==
- 1997–98 in Scottish football
