= 1995–96 Scottish Second Division =

Scottish Second Division
- Season: 1995–96
- Champions: Stirling Albion
- Promoted: Stirling Albion; East Fife
- Relegated: Forfar Athletic; Montrose

The 1995–96 Scottish Second Division was won by Stirling Albion who, along with second placed East Fife, were promoted to the First Division. Forfar Athletic and Montrose were relegated to the Third Division.

== Table ==
Pos	Team	Pld	W	D	L	GF	GA	GD	Pts	Promotion or relegation
1	Stirling Albion (C, P)	36	24	9	3	83	30	+53	81	Promotion to the First Division
2	East Fife (P)	36	19	10	7	50	29	+21	67	Promotion to the First Division
3	Berwick Rangers	36	18	6	12	64	47	+17	60	
4	Stenhousemuir	36	14	7	15	51	49	+2	49	
5	Clyde	36	11	12	13	47	45	+2	45	
6	Ayr United	36	11	12	13	40	40	0	45	
7	Queen of the South	36	11	10	15	54	67	−13	43	
8	Stranraer	36	8	18	10	38	43	−5	42	
9	Forfar Athletic (R)	36	11	7	18	37	61	−24	40	Relegation to the Third Division
10	Montrose (R)	36	5	5	26	33	86	−53	20	Relegation to the Third Division

Rules for classification: 1) points; 2) goal difference; 3) number of goals scored.
(C) Champions; (P) Promoted; (R) Relegated
