= 2023–24 Scottish Professional Football League =

Scottish Professional Football League
- Season: 2023–24

Statistics of the Scottish Professional Football League (SPFL) in season 2023–24.

== Scottish Premiership ==
Pos	Team	Pld	W	D	L	GF	GA	GD	Pts	Qualification or relegation (Note: Teams play each other three times (33 matches), before the league is split into two groups (the top six and the bottom six).)
1	Celtic (C)	38	29	6	3	95	30	+65	93	Qualification for the Champions League league stage
2	Rangers	38	27	4	7	87	32	+55	85	Qualification for the Champions League third qualifying round
3	Heart of Midlothian	38	20	8	10	54	42	+12	68	Qualification for the Europa League play-off round (Note: As the winners of the 2023–24 Scottish Cup, Celtic, qualified for the Champions League, the berth reserved for the cup winners (Europa League play-off round) passed to the third-placed team. The berths for the Europa League second qualifying round and the Conference League second qualifying round were passed down to the fourth- and fifth-placed teams.)
4	Kilmarnock	38	14	14	10	46	44	+2	56	Qualification for the Europa League second qualifying round
5	St Mirren	38	13	8	17	46	52	−6	47	Qualification for the Conference League second qualifying round
6	Dundee	38	10	12	16	49	68	−19	42	
7	Aberdeen	38	12	12	14	48	52	−4	48	
8	Hibernian	38	11	13	14	52	59	−7	46	
9	Motherwell	38	10	13	15	56	59	−3	43	
10	St Johnstone	38	8	11	19	29	54	−25	35	
11	Ross County (O)	38	8	11	19	38	67	−29	35	Qualification for the Premiership play-off final
12	Livingston (R)	38	5	10	23	29	70	−41	25	Relegation to Championship

Rules for classification: 1) Points; 2) Goal difference; 3) Goals scored; 4) Head-to-Head points; 5) Head-to-Head goal difference; 6) Play-off (only if deciding champion, UEFA competitions qualification, second stage group allocation or relegation).
(C) Champions; (O) Play-off winners; (R) Relegated

== Scottish Championship ==
Pos	Team	Pld	W	D	L	GF	GA	GD	Pts	Promotion, qualification or relegation
1	Dundee United (C, P)	36	22	9	5	73	23	+50	75	Promotion to the Premiership
2	Raith Rovers	36	20	9	7	58	42	+16	69	Qualification for the Premiership play-off semi-final
3	Partick Thistle	36	14	13	9	63	54	+9	55	Qualification for the Premiership play-off quarter-final
4	Airdrieonians	36	15	7	14	44	44	0	52	Qualification for the Premiership play-off quarter-final
5	Greenock Morton	36	12	9	15	43	46	−3	45	
6	Dunfermline Athletic	36	11	12	13	43	48	−5	45	
7	Ayr United	36	12	8	16	53	61	−8	44	
8	Queen's Park	36	11	10	15	50	56	−6	43	
9	Inverness Caledonian Thistle (R)	36	10	12	14	41	40	+1	42	Qualification for the Championship play-offs
10	Arbroath (R)	36	6	5	25	35	89	−54	23	Relegation to League One

Rules for classification: 1) Points; 2) Goal difference; 3) Goals scored; 4) Head-to-to head points; 5) Head-to-head goal difference; 6) Play-off (only for deciding promotion, play-off participation and relegation).
(C) Champions; (P) Promoted; (R) Relegated

== Scottish League One ==
Pos	Team	Pld	W	D	L	GF	GA	GD	Pts	Promotion, qualification or relegation
1	Falkirk (C, P)	36	27	9	0	96	28	+68	90	Promotion to the Championship
2	Hamilton Academical (O, P)	36	22	8	6	73	28	+45	74	Qualification for the Championship play-offs
3	Alloa Athletic	36	16	8	12	60	55	+5	56	Qualification for the Championship play-offs
4	Montrose	36	15	8	13	58	57	+1	53	Qualification for the Championship play-offs
5	Cove Rangers	36	14	7	15	58	63	−5	49	
6	Kelty Hearts	36	12	8	16	48	63	−15	44	
7	Queen of the South	36	11	8	17	46	53	−7	41	
8	Annan Athletic	36	9	12	15	55	68	−13	39	
9	Stirling Albion (R)	36	10	9	17	39	58	−19	39	Qualification for the League One play-offs
10	Edinburgh City (R)	36	3	5	28	38	98	−60	8 (Note: On 25 January 2024, Edinburgh City were deducted 6 points, having failed to pay its players’ wages on time and defaulting its tax obligations to HMRC, as well as not engaging fully in the disciplinary process leading to further breaches of SPFL Rules.)	Relegation to League Two

Rules for classification: 1) Points; 2) Goal difference; 3) Goals scored; 4) Head-to-to head points; 5) Head-to-head goal difference; 6) Play-off (only for deciding promotion, play-off participation and relegation).
(C) Champions; (O) Play-off winners; (P) Promoted; (R) Relegated

== Scottish League Two ==
Pos	Team	Pld	W	D	L	GF	GA	GD	Pts	Promotion, qualification or relegation
1	Stenhousemuir (C, P)	36	18	14	4	50	31	+19	68	Promotion to League One
2	Peterhead	36	16	12	8	58	39	+19	60	Qualification for the League One play-offs
3	The Spartans	36	15	13	8	53	43	+10	58	Qualification for the League One play-offs
4	Dumbarton (O, P)	36	16	9	11	56	44	+12	57	Qualification for the League One play-offs
5	East Fife	36	11	11	14	46	47	−1	44	
6	Forfar Athletic	36	9	15	12	38	45	−7	42	
7	Elgin City	36	10	10	16	35	59	−24	40	
8	Bonnyrigg Rose	36	9	12	15	47	48	−1	39	
9	Clyde	36	9	11	16	46	58	−12	38	
10	Stranraer (O)	36	9	9	18	38	53	−15	36	Qualification for the League Two play-off final

Rules for classification: 1) Points; 2) Goal difference; 3) Goals scored; 4) Head-to-to head points; 5) Head-to-head goal difference; 6) Play-off (only for deciding promotion, play-off participation and relegation).
(C) Champions; (O) Play-off winners; (P) Promoted

== Award winners ==
=== Monthly ===
Month	Premiership player	Championship player	League One player	League Two player	Premiership manager	Championship manager	League One manager	League Two manager	Ref
August	Ryan Strain (St Mirren)	Ruari Paton (Queen's Park)	Jamie Smith (Hamilton Academical)	Jamie Dishington (The Spartans)	Stephen Robinson (St Mirren)	Robin Veldman (Queen's Park)	John Rankin (Hamilton Academical)	Douglas Samuel (The Spartans)	
September	Matt O'Riley (Celtic)	Jermaine Hylton (Arbroath)	Callumn Morrison (Falkirk)	Gregor Buchanan (Stenhousemuir)	Brendan Rodgers (Celtic)	Jim Goodwin (Dundee United)	John McGlynn (Falkirk)	Gary Naysmith (Stenhousemuir)	
October	Abdallah Sima (Rangers)	Kai Fotheringham (Dundee United)	Kyle Macdonald (Hamilton Accies)	Bradley Whyte (Spartans)	Derek McInnes (Kilmarnock)	Jim Goodwin (Dundee United)	John McGlynn (Falkirk)	Douglas Samuel (Spartans)	
November	Lawrence Shankland (Heart of Midlothian)	David Wotherspoon (Inverness CT)	Rumarn Burrell (Cove Rangers)	Matthew Aitken (Stenhousemuir)	Steven Naismith (Heart of Midlothian)	Duncan Ferguson (Inverness CT)	Paul Hartley (Cove Rangers)	Gary Naysmith (Stenhousemuir)	
December	Lawrence Shankland (Heart of Midlothian)	Lewis Vaughan (Raith Rovers)	Rumarn Burrell (Cove Rangers)	Matthew Aitken (Stenhousemuir)	Derek McInnes (Kilmarnock)	Ian Murray (Raith Rovers)	John McGlynn (Falkirk)	Gary Naysmith (Stenhousemuir)	
January	Alan Forrest (Heart of Midlothian)	George Oakley (Greenock Morton)	Calvin Miller (Falkirk)	Blair Henderson (The Spartans)	Philippe Clement (Rangers)	Dougie Imrie (Greenock Morton)	John McGlynn (Falkirk)	Gary Naysmith (Stenhousemuir)	
February	Blair Spittal (Motherwell)	Dom Thomas (Queens Park)	Taylor Steven (Alloa Athletic)	Martin Rennie (Clyde)	Philippe Clement (Rangers)	Dougie Imrie (Greenock Morton)	Andy Graham (Alloa Athletic)	Ray McKinnon (Forfar)	
March	Myziane Maolida (Hibernian)	Louis Moult (Dundee United)	Callumn Morrison (Falkirk)	Alan Trouten (East Fife)	Tony Docherty (Dundee)	James McPake (Dunfermline Athletic)	John McGlynn (Falkirk)	Dick Campbell (East Fife)	
April	Luke McCowan (Dundee)	Brian Graham (Partick Thistle)	Aiden Smith (Annan)	Bradley Barrett (Bonnyrigg Rose)	Brendan Rodgers (Celtic)	Jim Goodwin (Dundee Utd)	John McGlynn (Falkirk)	Stevie Farrell (Dumbarton)	

== See also ==
- 2023–24 in Scottish football
