= 2021–22 Scottish Professional Football League =

Scottish Professional Football League
- Season: 2021–22

Statistics of the Scottish Professional Football League (SPFL) in season 2021–22.

== Scottish Premiership ==
Pos	Team	Pld	W	D	L	GF	GA	GD	Pts	Qualification or relegation (Note: Teams play each other three times (33 matches), before the league is split into two groups (the top six and the bottom six).)
1	Celtic (C)	38	29	6	3	92	22	+70	93	Qualification for the Champions League group stage
2	Rangers	38	27	8	3	80	31	+49	89	Qualification for the Champions League third qualifying round
3	Heart of Midlothian	38	17	10	11	54	44	+10	61	Qualification for the Europa League play-off round
4	Dundee United	38	12	12	14	37	44	−7	48	Qualification for the Europa Conference League third qualifying round
5	Motherwell	38	12	10	16	42	61	−19	46	Qualification for the Europa Conference League second qualifying round
6	Ross County	38	10	11	17	47	61	−14	41	
7	Livingston	38	13	10	15	41	46	−5	49	
8	Hibernian	38	11	12	15	38	42	−4	45	
9	St Mirren	38	10	14	14	33	51	−18	44	
10	Aberdeen	38	10	11	17	41	46	−5	41	
11	St Johnstone (O)	38	8	11	19	24	51	−27	35	Qualification for the Premiership play-off final
12	Dundee (R)	38	6	11	21	34	64	−30	29	Relegation to Championship

Rules for classification: 1) Points; 2) Goal difference; 3) Goals scored; 4) Head-to-head points; 5) Head-to-Head goal difference; 6) Play-off (only if deciding champion, UEFA competitions qualification, second stage group allocation or relegation).
(C) Champions; (O) Play-off winners; (R) Relegated

== Scottish Championship ==
Pos	Team	Pld	W	D	L	GF	GA	GD	Pts	Promotion, qualification or relegation
1	Kilmarnock (C, P)	36	20	7	9	50	27	+23	67	Promotion to the Premiership
2	Arbroath	36	17	14	5	54	28	+26	65	Qualification for the Premiership play-off semi-final
3	Inverness Caledonian Thistle	36	16	11	9	53	34	+19	59	Qualification for the Premiership play-off quarter-final
4	Partick Thistle	36	14	10	12	46	40	+6	52	Qualification for the Premiership play-off quarter-final
5	Raith Rovers	36	12	14	10	44	44	0	50	
6	Hamilton Academical	36	10	12	14	38	53	−15	42	
7	Greenock Morton	36	9	13	14	36	47	−11	40	
8	Ayr United	36	9	12	15	39	52	−13	39	
9	Dunfermline Athletic (R)	36	7	14	15	36	53	−17	35	Qualification for the Championship play-offs
10	Queen of the South (R)	36	8	9	19	36	54	−18	33	Relegation to League One

Rules for classification: 1) Points; 2) Goal difference; 3) Goals scored; 4) Head-to-to head points; 5) Head-to-head goal difference; 6) Play-off (only for deciding promotion, play-off participation and relegation).
(C) Champions; (P) Promoted; (R) Relegated

== Scottish League One ==
Pos	Team	Pld	W	D	L	GF	GA	GD	Pts	Promotion, qualification or relegation
1	Cove Rangers (C, P)	36	23	10	3	73	32	+41	79	Promotion to the Championship
2	Airdrieonians	36	21	9	6	68	37	+31	72	Qualification for the Championship play-offs
3	Montrose	36	15	14	7	53	36	+17	59	Qualification for the Championship play-offs
4	Queen's Park (O, P)	36	11	18	7	51	36	+15	51	Qualification for the Championship play-offs
5	Alloa Athletic	36	12	9	15	49	57	−8	45	
6	Falkirk	36	12	8	16	49	55	−6	44	
7	Peterhead	36	11	9	16	46	51	−5	42	
8	Clyde	36	9	12	15	39	62	−23	39	
9	Dumbarton (R)	36	9	7	20	48	71	−23	34	Qualification for the League One play-offs
10	East Fife (R)	36	5	8	23	31	70	−39	23	Relegation to League Two

Rules for classification: 1) Points; 2) Goal difference; 3) Goals scored; 4) Head-to-to head points; 5) Head-to-head goal difference; 6) Play-off (only for deciding promotion, play-off participation and relegation).
(C) Champions; (O) Play-off winners; (P) Promoted; (R) Relegated

== Scottish League Two ==
Pos	Team	Pld	W	D	L	GF	GA	GD	Pts	Promotion, qualification or relegation
1	Kelty Hearts (C, P)	36	24	9	3	68	28	+40	81	Promotion to League One
2	Forfar Athletic	36	16	12	8	57	36	+21	60	Qualification for the League One play-offs
3	Annan Athletic	36	18	5	13	64	51	+13	59	Qualification for the League One play-offs
4	Edinburgh City (O, P)	36	14	10	12	43	49	−6	52	Qualification for the League One play-offs
5	Stenhousemuir	36	13	10	13	47	46	+1	49	
6	Stranraer	36	13	8	15	50	54	−4	47	
7	Stirling Albion	36	11	9	16	41	46	−5	42	
8	Albion Rovers	36	10	9	17	37	58	−21	39	
9	Elgin City	36	9	10	17	33	51	−18	37	
10	Cowdenbeath (R)	36	7	8	21	28	49	−21	29	Qualification for the League Two play-off final

Rules for classification: 1) Points; 2) Goal difference; 3) Goals scored; 4) Head-to-to head points; 5) Head-to-head goal difference; 6) Play-off (only for deciding promotion, play-off participation and relegation).
(C) Champions; (O) Play-off winners; (P) Promoted; (R) Relegated

== Award winners ==
Month	Premiership player	Championship player	League One player	League Two player	Premiership manager	Championship manager	League One manager	League Two manager	Ref
August	Martin Boyle (Hibernian)	Michael McKenna (Arbroath)	Simon Murray (Queens Park)	Joe Cardle (Kelty Hearts)	Robbie Neilson (Heart of Midlothian)	Billy Dodds (Inverness Caledonian Thistle)	Laurie Ellis (Queen's Park)	Kevin Thomson (Kelty Hearts)	
September	Ian Harkes (Dundee United)	Joel Nouble (Arbroath)	Callum Wilson (Dumbarton)	Nathan Austin (Kelty Hearts)	Graham Alexander (Motherwell)	Dick Campbell (Arbroath)	Stephen Farrell (Dumbarton)	Kevin Rutkiewicz (Stirling Albion)	
October	Jota (Celtic)	Oli Shaw (Kilmarnock)	Rory McAllister (Cove Rangers)	Craig Thomson (Forfar Athletic)	Ange Postecoglou (Celtic)	John McGlynn (Scottish footballer) (Raith Rovers)	Stewart Petrie (Montrose)	Gary Irvine (Forfar Athletic)	
November	Jota (Celtic)	Ethan Ross (Raith Rovers)	Mitchel Megginson (Cove Rangers)	John Robertson (Edinburg City)	Graham Alexander (Motherwell)	Ian McCall (Partick Thistle)	Paul Hartley (Cove Rangers)	Kevin Thomson (Kelty Hearts)	
December	Alfredo Morelos (Rangers)	Anton Dowds (Arbroath)	Blair Yule (Cove Rangers)	Dominic Docherty (Annan Athletic)	Giovanni Van Bronckhorst (Rangers)	Dick Campbell (Arbroath)	Paul Hartley (Cove Rangers)	Peter Murphy (Annan Athletic)	
January	Regan Charles-Cook (Ross County)	Gavin Reilly (Greenock Morton)	Dylan Easton (Airdrieonians)	Tam Orr (Stenhousemuir)	Ange Postecoglou (Celtic)	Dougie Imrie (Greenock Morton)	Ian Murray (Airdrieonians)	Gavin Price (Elgin City)	
February	Bruce Anderson (Livingston)	Kyle Lafferty (Kilmarnock)	Rhys McCabe (Airdrieonians)	Nicky Jamieson (Stenhousemuir)	Ange Postecoglou (Celtic)	Dougie Imrie (Greenock Morton)	Ian Murray (Airdrieonians)	Stephen Swift (Stenhousemuir)	
March	Giorgos Giakoumakis (Celtic)	Kyle Lafferty (Kilmarnock)	Callum Smith (Airdrieonians)	Tommy Goss (Annan Athletic)	Ange Postecoglou (Celtic)	Derek McInnes (Kilmarnock)	Paul Hartley (Cove Rangers)	Kevin Thomson (Kelty Hearts)	

== See also ==
- 2021–22 in Scottish football
