= 2019–20 Scottish Professional Football League =

Scottish Professional Football League
- Season: 2019–20

Statistics of the Scottish Professional Football League (SPFL) in season 2019–20.

== Scottish Premiership ==
Pos	Team	Pld	W	D	L	GF	GA	GD	Pts	PPG	Qualification or relegation (Note: All play-off matches were cancelled, as clubs voted to curtail the season due to the COVID-19 pandemic.)
1	Celtic (C)	30	26	2	2	89	19	+70	80	2.67	Qualification for the Champions League first qualifying round
2	Rangers	29	21	4	4	64	19	+45	67	2.31	Qualification for the Europa League second qualifying round (Note: Since the 2019–20 Scottish Cup was postponed and could not be completed by the UEFA registration deadline of 3 August 2020, the spot awarded to the Scottish Cup winners (Europa League second qualifying round) was passed to the second-placed team, while the fourth-placed team also qualified for European competition.)
3	Motherwell	30	14	4	12	41	38	+3	46	1.53	Qualification for the Europa League first qualifying round
4	Aberdeen	30	12	9	9	40	36	+4	45	1.50	Qualification for the Europa League first qualifying round
5	Livingston	30	10	9	11	41	39	+2	39	1.30	
6	St Johnstone	29	8	12	9	28	46	−18	36	1.24	
7	Hibernian	30	9	10	11	42	49	−7	37	1.23	
8	Kilmarnock	30	9	6	15	31	41	−10	33	1.10	
9	St Mirren	30	7	8	15	24	41	−17	29	0.97	
10	Ross County	30	7	8	15	29	60	−31	29	0.97	
11	Hamilton Academical	30	6	9	15	30	50	−20	27	0.90	
12	Heart of Midlothian (R)	30	4	11	15	31	52	−21	23	0.77	Demotion to the Championship

Source: BBC SPFL
Rules for classification: 1) Points per game; 2) Goal difference; 3) Goals scored; 4) Head-to-head points; 5) Head-to-Head goal difference; 6) Play-off (only if deciding champion, UEFA competitions qualification, second stage group allocation or relegation).
(C) Champions; (R) Relegated

== Scottish Championship ==
Pos	Team	Pld	W	D	L	GF	GA	GD	Pts	PPG	Promotion, qualification or relegation (Note: All play-off matches were cancelled, as clubs voted to curtail the season due to the COVID-19 pandemic in Scotland.)
1	Dundee United (C, P)	28	18	5	5	52	22	+30	59	2.11	Promotion to the Premiership
2	Inverness Caledonian Thistle	27	14	3	10	39	32	+7	45	1.67	
3	Dundee	27	11	8	8	32	31	+1	41	1.52	
4	Ayr United	27	12	4	11	38	35	+3	40	1.48	
5	Arbroath	26	10	6	10	24	26	−2	36	1.38	
6	Dunfermline Athletic	28	10	7	11	41	36	+5	37	1.32	
7	Greenock Morton	28	10	6	12	45	52	−7	36	1.29	
8	Alloa Athletic	28	7	10	11	33	43	−10	31	1.11	
9	Queen of the South	28	7	7	14	28	40	−12	28	1.00	
10	Partick Thistle (R)	27	6	8	13	32	47	−15	26	0.96	Relegation to League One

Source: SPFL
Rules for classification: 1) Points per game.
(C) Champions; (P) Promoted; (R) Relegated

== Scottish League One ==
Pos	Team	Pld	W	D	L	GF	GA	GD	Pts	PPG	Promotion, qualification or relegation (Note: All play-off matches were cancelled, as clubs voted to curtail the season due to the COVID-19 pandemic.)
1	Raith Rovers (C, P)	28	15	8	5	49	33	+16	53	1.89	Promotion to the Championship
2	Falkirk	28	14	10	4	54	18	+36	52	1.86	
3	Airdrieonians	28	14	6	8	38	27	+11	48	1.71	
4	Montrose	28	15	2	11	48	38	+10	47	1.68	
5	East Fife	28	12	9	7	44	36	+8	45	1.61	
6	Dumbarton	28	11	5	12	35	44	−9	38	1.36	
7	Clyde	28	9	7	12	35	43	−8	34	1.21	
8	Peterhead	27	7	5	15	30	44	−14	26	0.96	
9	Forfar Athletic	28	6	6	16	26	47	−21	24	0.86	
10	Stranraer (R)	27	2	10	15	28	57	−29	16	0.59	Relegation to League Two

Source: SPFL
Rules for classification: 1) Points per game.
(C) Champions; (P) Promoted; (R) Relegated

== Scottish League Two ==
Pos	Team	Pld	W	D	L	GF	GA	GD	Pts	PPG	Promotion (Note: All play-off matches were cancelled, as clubs voted to curtail the season due to the COVID-19 pandemic.)
1	Cove Rangers (C, P)	28	22	2	4	76	34	+42	68	2.43	Promotion to League One
2	Edinburgh City	27	17	4	6	49	28	+21	55	2.04	
3	Elgin City	28	12	7	9	48	34	+14	43	1.54	
4	Cowdenbeath	27	12	5	10	37	35	+2	41	1.52	
5	Queen's Park	28	11	7	10	37	35	+2	40	1.43	
6	Stirling Albion	28	10	6	12	34	35	−1	36	1.29	
7	Annan Athletic	27	9	4	14	33	54	−21	31	1.15	
8	Stenhousemuir	28	7	8	13	32	48	−16	29	1.04	
9	Albion Rovers	26	6	6	14	37	51	−14	24	0.92	
10	Brechin City	27	4	5	18	31	60	−29	17	0.63	

Source: SPFL
Rules for classification: 1) Points per game.
(C) Champions; (P) Promoted

== Award winners ==
Month	Premiership player	Championship player	League One player	League Two player	Premiership manager	Championship manager	League One manager	League Two manager	Ref
August	Odsonne Édouard (Celtic)	Lawrence Shankland (Dundee United)	Marc McCallum (Forfar Athletic)	Declan Glass (Cove Rangers)	Neil Lennon (Celtic)	Robbie Neilson (Dundee United)	Darren Young (East Fife)	Paul Hartley (Cove Rangers)	
September	Alfredo Morelos (Rangers)	Alan Forrest (Ayr United)	Steven Anderson (Raith Rovers)	Craig Barr (Cowdenbeath)	Steven Gerrard (Rangers)	Ian McCall (Ayr United and Partick Thistle)	John McGlynn (Raith Rovers)	Gary Bollan (Cowdenbeath)	
October	Mohamed Elyounoussi (Celtic)	Declan McDaid (Dundee)	Graham Webster (Montrose)	Shane Sutherland (Elgin City)	Angelo Alessio (Kilmarnock)	James McPake (Dundee)	Stewart Petrie (Montrose)	Gavin Price (Elgin City)	
November	Christian Doidge (Hibernian)	Kevin Nisbet (Dunfermline Athletic)	Dale Carrick (Airdrieonians)	Salim Kouider-Aïssa (Queen's Park)	Neil Lennon (Celtic)	Robbie Neilson (Dundee United)	Ian Murray (Airdrieonians)	Mark Roberts (Queen's Park)	
December	Martin Boyle (Hibernian)	Calum Butcher (Dundee United)	Andrew Steeves (Montrose)	Liam Henderson (Edinburgh City)	Steven Gerrard (Rangers)	Robbie Neilson (Dundee United)	Stewart Petrie (Montrose)	James McDonaugh (Edinburgh City)	
January	Odsonne Édouard (Celtic)	Kevin O'Hara (Alloa Athletic)	Declan McManus (Falkirk)	Mitch Megginson (Cove Rangers)	Gary Holt (Livingston)	Peter Grant (Alloa Athletic)	David McCracken & Lee Miller (Falkirk)	Paul Hartley (Cove Rangers)	
February	Billy Mckay (Ross County)	Nicky Cadden (Greenock Morton)	Scott Agnew (East Fife)	Dylan Bikey (Stirling Albion)	Neil Lennon (Celtic)	David Hopkin (Greenock Morton)	Darren Young (East Fife)	Ray McKinnon (Queen's Park)	

== See also ==
- 2019–20 in Scottish football
