= 2024–25 Scottish Professional Football League =

Scottish Professional Football League
- Season: 2024–25

Statistics of the Scottish Professional Football League (SPFL) in season 2024–25.

== Scottish Premiership ==
Pos	Team	Pld	W	D	L	GF	GA	GD	Pts	Qualification or relegation (Note: Teams play each other three times (33 matches), before the league is split into two groups (the top six and the bottom six).)
1	Celtic (C)	38	29	5	4	112	26	+86	92	Qualification for the Champions League play-off round
2	Rangers	38	22	9	7	80	41	+39	75	Qualification for the Champions League second qualifying round
3	Hibernian	38	15	13	10	62	50	+12	58	Qualification for the Europa League second qualifying round
4	Dundee United	38	15	8	15	45	54	−9	53	Qualification for the Conference League second qualifying round
5	Aberdeen	38	15	8	15	48	61	−13	53	Qualification for the Europa League play-off round (Note: Aberdeen qualified for the Europa League play-off round as the 2024–25 Scottish Cup winners.)
6	St Mirren	38	14	8	16	53	59	−6	50	
7	Heart of Midlothian	38	15	7	16	52	47	+5	52	
8	Motherwell	38	14	7	17	46	63	−17	49	
9	Kilmarnock	38	12	8	18	45	64	−19	44	
10	Dundee	38	11	8	19	57	77	−20	41	
11	Ross County (R)	38	9	10	19	37	65	−28	37	Qualification for the Premiership play-off final
12	St Johnstone (R)	38	9	5	24	38	68	−30	32	Relegation to Championship

Rules for classification: 1) Points; 2) Goal difference; 3) Goals scored; 4) Head-to-head points; 5) Head-to-head goal difference; 6) Play-off (only if deciding champion, UEFA competitions qualification, second stage group allocation or relegation).
(C) Champions; (R) Relegated

== Scottish Championship ==
Pos	Team	Pld	W	D	L	GF	GA	GD	Pts	Promotion, qualification or relegation
1	Falkirk (C, P)	36	22	7	7	72	33	+39	73	Promotion to the Premiership
2	Livingston (O, P)	36	20	10	6	55	27	+28	70	Qualification for the Premiership play-off semi-final
3	Ayr United	36	18	9	9	57	39	+18	63	Qualification for the Premiership play-off quarter-final
4	Partick Thistle	36	15	10	11	43	38	+5	55	Qualification for the Premiership play-off quarter-final
5	Raith Rovers	36	15	8	13	47	43	+4	53	
6	Greenock Morton	36	12	12	12	42	48	−6	48	
7	Dunfermline Athletic	36	9	8	19	28	43	−15	35	
8	Queen's Park	36	9	8	19	36	55	−19	35	
9	Airdrieonians (O)	36	7	8	21	34	62	−28	29	Qualification for the Championship play-offs
10	Hamilton Academical (R)	36	10	6	20	38	64	−26	21 (Note: Hamilton Academical were deducted 15 points for breaching multiple SPFL Rules.)	Relegation to League One

Rules for classification: 1) Points; 2) Goal difference; 3) Goals scored; 4) Head-to-to head points; 5) Head-to-head goal difference; 6) Play-off (only for deciding promotion, play-off participation and relegation).
(C) Champions; (O) Play-off winners; (P) Promoted; (R) Relegated

== Scottish League One ==
Pos	Team	Pld	W	D	L	GF	GA	GD	Pts	Promotion, qualification or relegation
1	Arbroath (C, P)	36	19	7	10	58	42	+16	64	Promotion to the Championship
2	Cove Rangers	36	16	9	11	62	44	+18	57	Qualification for the Championship play-offs
3	Queen of the South	36	16	7	13	46	41	+5	55	Qualification for the Championship play-offs
4	Stenhousemuir	36	15	8	13	48	45	+3	53	Qualification for the Championship play-offs
5	Alloa Athletic	36	13	12	11	55	47	+8	51	
6	Kelty Hearts	36	11	11	14	40	46	−6	44	
7	Inverness Caledonian Thistle	36	16	10	10	45	38	+7	43 (Note: Inverness Caledonian Thistle were deducted 15 points for entering administration.)	
8	Montrose	36	9	13	14	40	49	−9	40	
9	Annan Athletic (R)	36	10	6	20	41	68	−27	36	Qualification for the League One play-offs
10	Dumbarton (R)	36	8	11	17	51	66	−15	20 (Note: Dumbarton were deducted 15 points for entering administration.)	Relegation to League Two

Rules for classification: 1) Points; 2) Goal difference; 3) Goals scored; 4) Head-to-to head points; 5) Head-to-head goal difference; 6) Play-off (only for deciding promotion, play-off participation and relegation).
(C) Champions; (P) Promoted; (R) Relegated

== Scottish League Two ==
Pos	Team	Pld	W	D	L	GF	GA	GD	Pts	Promotion, qualification or relegation
1	Peterhead (C, P)	36	19	9	8	52	40	+12	66	Promotion to League One
2	East Fife (O, P)	36	20	5	11	65	37	+28	65	Qualification for the League One play-offs
3	Edinburgh City	36	17	5	14	54	47	+7	56	Qualification for the League One play-offs
4	Elgin City	36	16	7	13	48	41	+7	55	Qualification for the League One play-offs
5	The Spartans	36	15	7	14	48	47	+1	52	
6	Stirling Albion	36	14	6	16	50	57	−7	48	
7	Clyde	36	11	10	15	49	54	−5	43	
8	Stranraer	36	11	7	18	34	42	−8	40	
9	Forfar Athletic	36	8	12	16	29	42	−13	36	
10	Bonnyrigg Rose (R)	36	12	6	18	40	62	−22	36 (Note: Bonnyrigg Rose were deducted 6 points for failing to maintain a Bronze level licence.)	Qualification for the League Two play-off final

Rules for classification: 1) Points; 2) Goal difference; 3) Goals scored; 4) Head-to-to head points; 5) Head-to-head goal difference; 6) Play-off (only for deciding promotion, play-off participation and relegation).
(C) Champions; (O) Play-off winners; (P) Promoted; (R) Relegated

== Award winners ==
Month	Premiership player	Championship player	League One player	League Two player	Premiership manager	Championship manager	League One manager	League Two manager	Ref
August	Callum McGregor (Celtic)	Anton Dowds (Falkirk)	Ross Cunningham (Kelty Hearts)	Nathan Austin (East Fife)	Jimmy Thelin (Aberdeen)	John McGlynn (Falkirk)	Michael Tidser (Kelty Hearts)	Jordon Brown and Ryan Strachan (Peterhead)	
September	Lennon Miller (Motherwell)	Cammy Kerr (Queen's Park)	Reece Lyon (Queen of the South)	Alan Trouten (East Fife)	Brendan Rodgers (Celtic)	Callum Davidson (Queen's Park)	Stewart Petrie (Montrose)	Dick Campbell (East Fife)	
October	Nicky Devlin (Aberdeen)	Ethan Ross (Falkirk)	Mitch Megginson (Cove Rangers)	Jack Murray (Elgin City)	Jimmy Thelin (Aberdeen)	John McGlynn (Falkirk)	Paul Hartley (Cove Rangers)	Allan Hale (Elgin City)	
November	Sam Dalby (Dundee United)	Scott Robinson (Partick Thistle)	Scott Williamson (Kelty Hearts)	Connor Young (Edinburgh City)	Brendan Rodgers (Celtic)	David Martindale (Livingston)	Scott Kellacher (Inverness CT)	Michael McIndoe (Edinburgh City)	
December	Nicky Cadden (Hibernian)	Cameron Blues (Greenock Morton)	Gavin Reilly (Arbroath)	Liam Scullion (Clyde)	David Gray (Hibernian)	Dougie Imrie (Greenock Morton)	David Gold and Colin Hamilton (Arbroath)	Michael McIndoe (Edinburgh City)	
January	Hamza Igamane (Rangers)	George Oakley (Ayr United)	Adam Brooks (Queen of the South)	Alan Trouten (East Fife)	Neil Critchley (Heart of Midlothian)	Scott Brown (Ayr United)	Peter Murphy (Queen of the South)	Dick Campbell (East Fife)	
February	Daizen Maeda (Celtic)	Scott Arfield (Falkirk)	Owen Stirton (Montrose)	Ouzy See (Edinburgh City)	David Gray (Hibernian)	David Martindale (Livingston)	Gary Naysmith (Stenhousemuir)	Michael McIndoe (Edinburgh City)	
March	Daizen Maeda (Celtic)	Calvin Miller (Falkirk)	Blair Lyons (Montrose)	Martin Rennie (Clyde)	David Gray (Hibernian)	Brian Graham and Mark Wilson (Partick Thistle)	David Gold and Colin Hamilton (Arbroath)	Jordon Brown and Ryan Strachan (Peterhead)	
April	Simon Murray (Dundee)	Robbie Muirhead (Livingston)	Jordan Allan (Queen of the South)	Cammy Smith (Peterhead)	Jimmy Thelin (Aberdeen)	David Martindale (Livingston)	Peter Murphy (Queen of the South)	Jordon Brown and Ryan Strachan (Peterhead)	

== See also ==
- 2024–25 in Scottish football
