= 2016–17 Scottish Professional Football League =

Scottish Professional Football League
- Season: 2016–17

Statistics of the Scottish Professional Football League in season 2016–17.

== Scottish Premiership ==
Pos	Team	Pld	W	D	L	GF	GA	GD	Pts	Qualification or relegation (Note: Teams played each other three times (33 matches), before the league split into two groups (the top six and the bottom six) for the last five matches.)
1	Celtic (C)	38	34	4	0	106	25	+81	106	Qualification for the Champions League second qualifying round (Note: Since the winners of the 2016–17 Scottish Cup, Celtic, qualified for European competition based on league position, the spot awarded to the Scottish cup winners (Europa League second qualifying round) was passed to the second-placed team and the spot awarded to the second-placed team (Europa League first qualifying round) was passed to the fourth-placed team.)
2	Aberdeen	38	24	4	10	74	35	+39	76	Qualification for the Europa League second qualifying round
3	Rangers	38	19	10	9	56	44	+12	67	Qualification for the Europa League first qualifying round
4	St Johnstone	38	17	7	14	50	46	+4	58	Qualification for the Europa League first qualifying round
5	Heart of Midlothian	38	12	10	16	55	52	+3	46	
6	Partick Thistle	38	10	12	16	38	54	−16	42	
7	Ross County	38	11	13	14	48	58	−10	46	
8	Kilmarnock	38	9	14	15	36	56	−20	41	
9	Motherwell	38	10	8	20	46	69	−23	38	
10	Dundee	38	10	7	21	38	62	−24	37	
11	Hamilton Academical (O)	38	7	14	17	37	56	−19	35	Qualification for the Premiership play-off final
12	Inverness Caledonian Thistle (R)	38	7	13	18	44	71	−27	34	Relegation to the Scottish Championship

Source: Scottish Premiership, Soccerway
Rules for classification: 1) Points; 2) Goal difference; 3) Goals scored; 4) Play-off (only if deciding champion, UEFA competitions qualification and second stage group allocation).
(C) Champions; (O) Play-off winners; (R) Relegated

== Scottish Championship ==
Pos	Team	Pld	W	D	L	GF	GA	GD	Pts	Promotion, qualification or relegation
1	Hibernian (C, P)	36	19	14	3	59	25	+34	71	Promotion to Premiership
2	Falkirk	36	16	12	8	58	40	+18	60	Qualification for the Premiership play-off semi-finals
3	Dundee United	36	15	12	9	50	42	+8	57	Qualification for the Premiership play-off quarter-finals
4	Greenock Morton	36	13	13	10	44	41	+3	52	Qualification for the Premiership play-off quarter-finals
5	Dunfermline Athletic	36	12	12	12	46	43	+3	48	
6	Queen of the South	36	11	10	15	46	52	−6	43	
7	St Mirren	36	9	12	15	52	56	−4	39	
8	Dumbarton	36	9	12	15	46	56	−10	39	
9	Raith Rovers (R)	36	10	9	17	35	52	−17	39	Qualification for the Championship play-offs
10	Ayr United (R)	36	7	12	17	33	62	−29	33	Relegation to League One

Source: Soccerway
Rules for classification: 1) Points; 2) Goal difference; 3) Number of goals scored
(C) Champions; (P) Promoted; (R) Relegated

== Scottish League One ==
Pos	Team	Pld	W	D	L	GF	GA	GD	Pts	Promotion, qualification or relegation
1	Livingston (C, P)	36	26	3	7	80	32	+48	81	Promotion to Scottish Championship
2	Alloa Athletic	36	17	11	8	69	44	+25	62	Qualification to Championship play-offs
3	Airdrieonians	36	16	4	16	61	66	−5	52	Qualification to Championship play-offs
4	Brechin City (O, P)	36	15	5	16	43	49	−6	50	Qualification to Championship play-offs
5	East Fife	36	12	10	14	41	44	−3	46	
6	Queen's Park	36	12	10	14	37	51	−14	46	
7	Stranraer	36	12	8	16	46	50	−4	44	
8	Albion Rovers	36	11	9	16	41	48	−7	42	
9	Peterhead (R)	36	10	10	16	44	59	−15	40	Qualification to League One play-offs
10	Stenhousemuir (R)	36	11	6	19	45	64	−19	39	Relegation to Scottish League Two

Updated to match(es) played on 6 May 2017. Source: Soccerway
Rules for classification: 1) Points; 2) Goal difference; 3) Number of goals scored
(C) Champions; (O) Play-off winners; (P) Promoted; (R) Relegated

== Scottish League Two ==
Pos	Team	Pld	W	D	L	GF	GA	GD	Pts	Promotion, qualification or relegation
1	Arbroath (C, P)	36	18	12	6	63	36	+27	66	Promotion to League One
2	Forfar Athletic (O, P)	36	18	10	8	69	49	+20	64	Qualification to League One play-offs
3	Annan Athletic	36	18	4	14	61	58	+3	58	Qualification to League One play-offs
4	Montrose	36	14	10	12	44	53	−9	52	Qualification to League One play-offs
5	Elgin City	36	14	9	13	67	47	+20	51	
6	Stirling Albion	36	12	11	13	50	59	−9	47	
7	Edinburgh City	36	11	10	15	38	45	−7	43	
8	Berwick Rangers	36	10	10	16	50	65	−15	40	
9	Clyde	36	10	8	18	49	64	−15	38	
10	Cowdenbeath (O)	36	9	8	19	40	55	−15	35	Qualification to League Two play-off finals

Source: BBC Sport
Rules for classification: 1) Points; 2) Goal difference; 3) Number of goals scored
(C) Champions; (O) Play-off winners; (P) Promoted

== Award winners ==
=== Yearly ===
Division	Manager of Season		Player of Season	
Division	Winner	Club	Winner	Club
Premiership	Brendan Rodgers	Celtic	Scott Brown	Celtic
Championship	Jim Duffy	Greenock Morton	John McGinn	Hibernian
League One	not awarded			
League Two	Dick Campbell	Arbroath	Shane Sutherland	Elgin City

=== Monthly ===
Month	Premiership player	Championship player	League One player	League Two player	Premiership manager	Championship manager	League One manager	League Two manager	Ref
August	Liam Boyce (Ross County)	Jason Cummings (Hibernian)	Jordan Kirkpatrick (Alloa Athletic)	Josh Peters (Forfar Athletic)	Brendan Rodgers (Celtic)	Neil Lennon (Hibernian)	Jack Ross (Alloa Athletic)	Gary Bollan (Forfar Athletic)	
September	Moussa Dembélé (Celtic)	Cammy Bell (Dundee United)	Jamie Insall (East Fife)	Thomas O'Brien (Forfar Athletic)	Richie Foran (Inverness CT)	Peter Houston (Falkirk)	Gary Naysmith (East Fife)	Gary Bollan (Forfar Athletic)	
October	Adam Barton (Partick Thistle)	Thomas O'Ware (Greenock Morton)	Liam Buchanan (Livingston)	Shane Sutherland (Elgin City)	Brendan Rodgers (Celtic)	Jim Duffy (Greenock Morton)	David Hopkin (Livingston)	Jim Weir (Elgin City)	
November	Bjørn Johnsen (Heart of Midlothian)	John McGinn (Hibernian)	Rohan Ferguson (Airdrieonians)	Marc Laird (Edinburgh City)	Robbie Neilson (Heart of Midlothian)	Ray McKinnon (Dundee United)	Mark Wilson (Airdrieonians)	Gary Jardine (Edinburgh City)	
December	Stuart Armstrong (Celtic)	Mark Docherty (Dumbarton)	Jonathan Page (East Fife)	Andrew Stobie (Edinburgh City)	Brendan Rodgers (Celtic)	Stephen Aitken (Dumbarton)	Barry Smith (East Fife)	Gary Jardine (Edinburgh City)	
January	No award, due to winter break	Ross Forbes (Greenock Morton)	Michael Dunlop (Albion Rovers)	Shane Sutherland (Elgin City)	No award, due to winter break	Neil Lennon (Hibernian)	Jim McInally (Peterhead)	Gary Bollan (Forfar Athletic)	
February	Moussa Dembélé (Celtic)	Jason Cummings (Hibernian)	Willie Gibson (Stranraer)	Gavin Skelton (Annan Athletic)	Paul Hartley (Dundee)	Peter Houston (Falkirk)	Jim Goodwin (Alloa Athletic)	Jim Chapman (Annan Athletic)	
March	Stuart Armstrong (Celtic)	Efe Ambrose (Hibernian)	Andy Jackson (Brechin City)	Greg Rutherford (Berwick Rangers)	Derek McInnes (Aberdeen)	Jack Ross (St Mirren)	David Hopkin (Livingston)	Dave Mackay (Stirling Albion)	
April	Liam Boyce (Ross County)	Stevie Mallan (St Mirren)	Liam Buchanan (Livingston)	Ryan McCord (Arbroath)	Brendan Rodgers (Celtic)	Jack Ross (St Mirren)	David Hopkin (Livingston)	Dick Campbell (Arbroath)	

== See also ==
- 2016–17 in Scottish football
