= 2013–14 Scottish Professional Football League =

Scottish Professional Football League
- Season: 2013–14

Statistics of the Scottish Professional Football League in season 2013–14. It was the first season of the competition, which had been formed in the summer of 2013 by the merger of the Scottish Premier League and the Scottish Football League.

== Scottish Premiership ==
Pos	Team	Pld	W	D	L	GF	GA	GD	Pts	Qualification or relegation
1	Celtic (C)	38	31	6	1	102	25	+77	99	Qualification for the Champions League second qualifying round
2	Motherwell	38	22	4	12	64	60	+4	70	Qualification for the Europa League second qualifying round
3	Aberdeen	38	20	8	10	53	38	+15	68	Qualification for the Europa League first qualifying round
4	Dundee United	38	16	10	12	65	50	+15	58	
5	Inverness Caledonian Thistle	38	16	9	13	44	44	0	57	
6	St Johnstone	38	15	8	15	48	42	+6	53	Qualification for the Europa League second qualifying round (Note: St Johnstone, as winners of the 2013–14 Scottish Cup, qualified for the Europa League second qualifying round.)
7	Ross County	38	11	7	20	44	62	−18	40	
8	St Mirren	38	10	9	19	39	58	−19	39	
9	Kilmarnock	38	11	6	21	45	66	−21	39	
10	Partick Thistle	38	8	14	16	46	65	−19	38	
11	Hibernian (R)	38	8	11	19	31	51	−20	35	Qualification for the Premiership play-off final
12	Heart of Midlothian (R)	38	10	8	20	45	65	−20	23 (Note: Heart of Midlothian were deducted 15 points for entering administration)	Relegation to the Championship

Source: SPFL Archive
Rules for classification: 1) points; 2) goal difference; 3) number of goals scored.
(C) Champions; (R) Relegated

== Scottish Championship ==
Pos	Team	Pld	W	D	L	GF	GA	GD	Pts	Promotion, qualification or relegation
1	Dundee (C, P)	36	21	6	9	54	26	+28	69	Promotion to the Premiership
2	Hamilton Academical (O, P)	36	19	10	7	68	41	+27	67	Qualification for the Premiership play-off semi-final
3	Falkirk	36	19	9	8	59	33	+26	66	Qualification for the Premiership play-off quarter-final
4	Queen of the South	36	16	7	13	53	39	+14	55	Qualification for the Premiership play-off quarter-final
5	Dumbarton	36	15	6	15	65	64	+1	51	
6	Livingston	36	13	7	16	51	56	−5	46	
7	Raith Rovers	36	11	9	16	48	61	−13	42	
8	Alloa Athletic	36	11	7	18	34	51	−17	40	
9	Cowdenbeath (O)	36	11	7	18	50	72	−22	40	Qualification for the Championship play-offs
10	Greenock Morton (R)	36	6	8	22	32	71	−39	26	Relegation to League One

Source: Soccerway
Rules for classification: 1) points; 2) goal difference; 3) number of goals scored.
(C) Champions; (O) Play-off winners; (P) Promoted; (R) Relegated

== Scottish League One ==
Pos	Team	Pld	W	D	L	GF	GA	GD	Pts	Qualification or relegation
1	Rangers (C, P)	36	33	3	0	106	18	+88	102	Promotion to the Championship
2	Dunfermline Athletic	36	19	6	11	68	54	+14	63	Qualification for the Championship play-offs
3	Stranraer	36	14	9	13	57	57	0	51	Qualification for the Championship play-offs
4	Ayr United	36	14	7	15	65	66	−1	49	Qualification for the Championship play-offs
5	Stenhousemuir	36	12	12	12	57	66	−9	48	
6	Airdrieonians	36	12	9	15	47	57	−10	45	
7	Forfar Athletic	36	12	7	17	55	62	−7	43	
8	Brechin City	36	12	6	18	57	71	−14	42	
9	East Fife (R)	36	9	5	22	31	69	−38	32	Qualification for the League One play-offs
10	Arbroath (R)	36	9	4	23	52	75	−23	31	Relegation to League Two

Source: SPFL
Rules for classification: 1) points; 2) goal difference; 3) number of goals scored.
(C) Champions; (P) Promoted; (R) Relegated

== Scottish League Two ==
Pos	Team	Pld	W	D	L	GF	GA	GD	Pts	Promotion or qualification
1	Peterhead (C, P)	36	23	7	6	74	38	+36	76	Promotion to League One
2	Annan Athletic	36	19	6	11	69	49	+20	63	Qualification for the League One play-offs
3	Stirling Albion (O, P)	36	16	10	10	60	50	+10	58	Qualification for the League One play-offs
4	Clyde	36	17	6	13	50	48	+2	57	Qualification for the League One play-offs
5	Berwick Rangers	36	15	7	14	63	49	+14	52	
6	Montrose	36	12	10	14	44	56	−12	46	
7	Albion Rovers	36	12	8	16	41	54	−13	44	
8	East Stirlingshire	36	12	8	16	45	59	−14	44	
9	Elgin City	36	9	9	18	62	73	−11	36	
10	Queen's Park	36	5	9	22	36	68	−32	24	

Source: SPFL
Rules for classification: 1) points; 2) goal difference; 3) number of goals scored.
(C) Champions; (O) Play-off winners; (P) Promoted

== Award winners ==
Month	SPFL player	SPFL young player	Premiership manager	Championship manager	League One manager	League Two manager	Ref
August	Richie Foran (Inverness CT)	Stuart Bannigan (Partick Thistle)	Terry Butcher (Inverness CT)	Alex Neil (Hamilton Academical)	Martyn Corrigan (Stenhousemuir)	John Coughlin (East Stirlingshire)	
September	Billy McKay (Inverness CT)	Andrew Robertson	Derek McInnes (Aberdeen)	Grant Murray (Raith Rovers)	Ally McCoist (Rangers)	Stuart Garden (Montrose)	
October	Stevie May (St Johnstone)	Blair Spittal (Queen's Park)	Tommy Wright (St Johnstone)	Grant Murray (Raith Rovers)	Stephen Aitken (Stranraer)	Jim Duffy (Clyde)	
November	Andrew Robertson (Dundee United)	Ryan Gauld (Dundee United)	Jackie McNamara (Dundee United)	Gary Holt (Falkirk)	Stephen Aitken (Stranraer)	Jim McInally (Peterhead)	
December	Kris Commons (Celtic)	John McGinn (St Mirren)	Neil Lennon (Celtic)	John McGlynn (Livingston)	Stephen Aitken (Stranraer)	James Ward (Albion Rovers)	
January	Fraser Forster (Celtic)	Craig Slater (Kilmarnock)	Neil Lennon (Celtic)	Ian Murray (Dumbarton)	Ally McCoist (Rangers)	Colin Cameron (Berwick Rangers)	
February	Adam Rooney (Aberdeen)	Sam Stanton (Hibernian)	Derek McInnes (Aberdeen)	Jimmy Nicholl (Cowdenbeath)	Jim Jefferies (Dunfermline Athletic)	Jim Chapman {Annan Athletic)	
March	Rory McAllister (Peterhead)	Liam Henderson (Celtic)	Neil Lennon (Celtic)	Alex Neil (Hamilton Academical)	Gary Bollan (Airdrieonians)	Jim McInally (Peterhead)	
April	Kenny McLean (St Mirren)	Callum Paterson (Heart of Midlothian)	Gary Locke (Heart of Midlothian)	Gary Holt (Falkirk)	Gary Bollan (Airdrieonians)	Greig McDonald (Stirling Albion)	

== See also ==
- 2013–14 in Scottish football
