= 2015–16 Scottish Professional Football League =

Scottish Professional Football League
- Season: 2015–16

Statistics of the Scottish Professional Football League in season 2015–16.

== Scottish Premiership ==
| Pos | Team | Pld | W | D | L | GF | GA | GD | Pts | Qualification or relegation (Note: Teams play each other three times (33 matches), before the league is split into two groups (the top six and the bottom six).) |
|---|---|---|---|---|---|---|---|---|---|---|
| 1 | Celtic (C) | 38 | 26 | 8 | 4 | 93 | 31 | +62 | 86 | Qualification for the Champions League second qualifying round |
| 2 | Aberdeen | 38 | 22 | 5 | 11 | 62 | 48 | +14 | 71 | Qualification for the Europa League first qualifying round |
| 3 | Heart of Midlothian | 38 | 18 | 11 | 9 | 59 | 40 | +19 | 65 | Qualification for the Europa League first qualifying round |
| 4 | St Johnstone | 38 | 16 | 8 | 14 | 58 | 55 | +3 | 56 | |
| 5 | Motherwell | 38 | 15 | 5 | 18 | 47 | 63 | −16 | 50 | |
| 6 | Ross County | 38 | 14 | 6 | 18 | 55 | 61 | −6 | 48 | |
| 7 | Inverness Caledonian Thistle | 38 | 14 | 10 | 14 | 54 | 48 | +6 | 52 | |
| 8 | Dundee | 38 | 11 | 15 | 12 | 53 | 57 | −4 | 48 | |
| 9 | Partick Thistle | 38 | 12 | 10 | 16 | 41 | 50 | −9 | 46 | |
| 10 | Hamilton Academical | 38 | 11 | 10 | 17 | 42 | 63 | −21 | 43 | |
| 11 | Kilmarnock (O) | 38 | 9 | 9 | 20 | 41 | 64 | −23 | 36 | Qualification for the Premiership play-off final |
| 12 | Dundee United (Note: Dundee United were deducted three points for fielding an ineligible player in their win over Inverness Caledonian Thistle on 6 May 2016.) (R) | 38 | 8 | 7 | 23 | 45 | 70 | −25 | 28 | Relegation to the Scottish Championship |

Source: Scottish Premiership, Soccerway (first phase), Soccerway (second phase)
Rules for classification: 1) Points; 2) Goal difference; 3) Goals scored; 4) Play-off (only if deciding champion, UEFA competitions qualification and second stage group allocation).
(C) Champions; (O) Play-off winners; (R) Relegated

== Scottish Championship ==
| Pos | Team | Pld | W | D | L | GF | GA | GD | Pts | Promotion, qualification or relegation |
|---|---|---|---|---|---|---|---|---|---|---|
| 1 | Rangers (C, P) | 36 | 25 | 6 | 5 | 88 | 34 | +54 | 81 | Promotion to the Premiership |
| 2 | Falkirk | 36 | 19 | 13 | 4 | 61 | 34 | +27 | 70 | Qualification for the Premiership play-off semi-finals |
| 3 | Hibernian | 36 | 21 | 7 | 8 | 59 | 34 | +25 | 70 | Qualification for the Europa League second qualifying round and for the Premiership play-off quarter-finals (Note: Hibernian qualified for the Europa League second qualifying round by winning the 2015–16 Scottish Cup.) |
| 4 | Raith Rovers | 36 | 18 | 8 | 10 | 52 | 46 | +6 | 62 | Qualification for the Premiership play-off quarter-finals |
| 5 | Greenock Morton | 36 | 11 | 10 | 15 | 39 | 42 | −3 | 43 | |
| 6 | St Mirren | 36 | 11 | 9 | 16 | 44 | 53 | −9 | 42 | |
| 7 | Queen of the South | 36 | 12 | 6 | 18 | 46 | 56 | −10 | 42 | |
| 8 | Dumbarton | 36 | 10 | 7 | 19 | 35 | 66 | −31 | 37 | |
| 9 | Livingston (R) | 36 | 8 | 7 | 21 | 37 | 51 | −14 | 31 | Qualification for the Championship play-offs |
| 10 | Alloa Athletic (R) | 36 | 4 | 9 | 23 | 22 | 67 | −45 | 21 | Relegation to League One |

Source: Soccerway
Rules for classification: 1) Points; 2) Goal difference; 3) Number of goals scored
(C) Champions; (P) Promoted; (R) Relegated

== Scottish League One ==
| Pos | Team | Pld | W | D | L | GF | GA | GD | Pts | Promotion, qualification or relegation |
|---|---|---|---|---|---|---|---|---|---|---|
| 1 | Dunfermline Athletic (C, P) | 36 | 24 | 7 | 5 | 83 | 30 | +53 | 79 | Promotion to Scottish Championship |
| 2 | Ayr United (O, P) | 36 | 19 | 4 | 13 | 65 | 47 | +18 | 61 | Qualification to Championship play-offs |
| 3 | Peterhead | 36 | 16 | 11 | 9 | 72 | 47 | +25 | 59 | Qualification to Championship play-offs |
| 4 | Stranraer | 36 | 15 | 6 | 15 | 43 | 49 | −6 | 51 | Qualification to Championship play-offs |
| 5 | Airdrieonians | 36 | 14 | 7 | 15 | 48 | 50 | −2 | 49 | |
| 6 | Albion Rovers | 36 | 13 | 10 | 13 | 40 | 44 | −4 | 49 | |
| 7 | Brechin City | 36 | 12 | 6 | 18 | 47 | 59 | −12 | 42 | |
| 8 | Stenhousemuir | 36 | 11 | 7 | 18 | 46 | 80 | −34 | 40 | |
| 9 | Cowdenbeath (R) | 36 | 11 | 6 | 19 | 46 | 72 | −26 | 39 | Qualification to League One play-offs |
| 10 | Forfar Athletic (R) | 36 | 8 | 10 | 18 | 48 | 60 | −12 | 34 | Relegation to Scottish League Two |

Source: BBC Sport
Rules for classification: 1) Points; 2) Goal difference; 3) Number of goals scored
(C) Champions; (O) Play-off winners; (P) Promoted; (R) Relegated

== Scottish League Two ==
| Pos | Team | Pld | W | D | L | GF | GA | GD | Pts | Promotion, qualification or relegation |
|---|---|---|---|---|---|---|---|---|---|---|
| 1 | East Fife (C, P) | 36 | 18 | 8 | 10 | 62 | 41 | +21 | 62 | Promotion to Scottish League One |
| 2 | Elgin City | 36 | 17 | 8 | 11 | 59 | 46 | +13 | 59 | Qualification to League One play-offs |
| 3 | Clyde | 36 | 17 | 6 | 13 | 56 | 45 | +11 | 57 | Qualification to League One play-offs |
| 4 | Queen's Park (O, P) | 36 | 15 | 11 | 10 | 46 | 32 | +14 | 56 | Qualification to League One play-offs |
| 5 | Annan Athletic | 36 | 16 | 8 | 12 | 69 | 57 | +12 | 56 | |
| 6 | Berwick Rangers | 36 | 14 | 7 | 15 | 45 | 50 | −5 | 49 | |
| 7 | Stirling Albion | 36 | 13 | 9 | 14 | 47 | 46 | +1 | 48 | |
| 8 | Montrose | 36 | 11 | 10 | 15 | 50 | 70 | −20 | 43 | |
| 9 | Arbroath | 36 | 11 | 6 | 19 | 42 | 51 | −9 | 39 | |
| 10 | East Stirlingshire (R) | 36 | 9 | 5 | 22 | 41 | 79 | −38 | 32 | Qualification for the League Two play-off final |

Source: BBC Sport
Rules for classification: 1) Points; 2) Goal difference; 3) Number of goals scored
(C) Champions; (O) Play-off winners; (P) Promoted; (R) Relegated

== Award winners ==
=== Yearly ===
| Division | Manager of Season | | Player of Season | |
| Division | Winner | Club | Winner | Club |
|---|---|---|---|---|
| Premiership | Tommy Wright | St Johnstone | Leigh Griffiths | Celtic |
| Championship | Peter Houston | Falkirk | John McGinn | Hibernian |
| League One | Ian McCall | Ayr United | not awarded | |
| League Two | Gary Naysmith | East Fife | not awarded | |

=== Monthly ===
| Month | Premiership player | Championship player | League One player | League Two player | Premiership manager | Championship manager | League One manager | League Two manager | Ref |
|---|---|---|---|---|---|---|---|---|---|
| August | Leigh Griffiths (Celtic) | James Tavernier (Rangers) | Faissal El Bakhtaoui (Dunfermline Athletic) | Smart Osadolor (Annan Athletic) | Derek McInnes (Aberdeen) | Mark Warburton (Rangers) | Dick Campbell (Forfar Athletic) | Gary Naysmith (East Fife) | |
| September | Niall McGinn (Aberdeen) | Martyn Waghorn (Rangers) | Nicky Devlin (Ayr United) | Bobby Linn (Arbroath) | Derek McInnes (Aberdeen) | Mark Warburton (Rangers) | Ian McCall (Ayr United) | Gus MacPherson (Queen's Park) | |
| October | Leigh Griffiths (Celtic) | Jason Cummings (Hibernian) | Sean Murdoch (Dunfermline Athletic) | Matty Flynn (Annan Athletic) | Ronny Deila (Celtic) | Alan Stubbs (Hibernian) | Darren Young (Albion Rovers) | Paul Hegarty (Montrose) | |
| November | Michael O'Halloran (St Johnstone) | John McGinn (Hibernian) | Leighton McIntosh (Peterhead) | David Gormley (Clyde) | Alan Archibald (Partick Thistle) | Alan Stubbs (Hibernian) | Brown Ferguson (Stenhousemuir) | Barry Ferguson (Clyde) | |
| December | Liam Boyce (Ross County) | Danny Rogers (Falkirk) | Greig Spence (Cowdenbeath) | Darren Smith (Stirling Albion) | Mark McGhee (Motherwell) | Peter Houston (Falkirk) | Allan Johnston (Dunfermline Athletic) | Stuart McLaren (Stirling Albion) | |
| January | Kane Hemmings (Dundee) | Kenny Miller (Rangers) | Shane Sutherland (Peterhead) | Nathan Austin (East Fife) | Ronny Deila (Celtic) | Mark Warburton (Rangers) | Jim McInally (Peterhead) | Jim Weir (Elgin City) | |
| February | Paul Paton (Dundee United) | Declan McManus (Greenock Morton) | Rory McAllister (Peterhead) | Steven Doris (Stirling Albion) | Mixu Paatelainen (Dundee United) | Peter Houston (Falkirk) | Jim McInally (Peterhead) | Barry Ferguson (Clyde) | |
| March | Jackson Irvine (Ross County) | Christian Nadé (Dumbarton) | Faissal El Bakhtaoui (Dunfermline Athletic) | Kyle Wilkie (East Fife) | Mark McGhee (Motherwell) | Ray McKinnon (Raith Rovers) | Allan Johnston (Dunfermline Athletic) | Gary Naysmith (East Fife) | |
| April | Patrick Roberts (Celtic) | Will Vaulks (Falkirk) | Robert Thomson (Brechin City) | Brian Cameron (Elgin City) | John Hughes (Inverness CT) | Ray McKinnon (Raith Rovers) | Darren Dods (Brechin City) | John Coughlin (Berwick Rangers) | |

== See also ==
- 2015–16 in Scottish football
