= 2014–15 Scottish Professional Football League =

Scottish Professional Football League
- Season: 2014–15

Statistics of the Scottish Professional Football League in season 2014–15.

== Scottish Premiership ==
Pos	Team	Pld	W	D	L	GF	GA	GD	Pts	Qualification or relegation
1	Celtic (C)	38	29	5	4	84	17	+67	92	Qualification for the Champions League second qualifying round
2	Aberdeen	38	23	6	9	57	33	+24	75	Qualification for the Europa League first qualifying round
3	Inverness Caledonian Thistle	38	19	8	11	52	42	+10	65	Qualification for the Europa League second qualifying round (Note: Inverness Caledonian Thistle qualified for the second qualifying round of the UEFA Europa League by winning the 2014–15 Scottish Cup.)
4	St Johnstone	38	16	9	13	34	34	0	57	Qualification for the Europa League first qualifying round
5	Dundee United	38	17	5	16	58	56	+2	56	
6	Dundee (Note: Teams in the bottom six at the time of the split (33 games) cannot pass teams in the top six)	38	11	12	15	46	57	−11	45	
7	Hamilton Academical	38	15	8	15	50	53	−3	53	
8	Partick Thistle	38	12	10	16	48	44	+4	46	
9	Ross County	38	12	8	18	46	63	−17	44	
10	Kilmarnock	38	11	8	19	44	59	−15	41	
11	Motherwell (O)	38	10	6	22	38	63	−25	36	Qualification for the Premiership play-off final
12	St Mirren (R)	38	9	3	26	30	66	−36	30	Relegation to the Championship

Source: SPFL
Rules for classification: 1) points; 2) goal difference; 3) number of goals scored
(C) Champions; (O) Play-off winners; (R) Relegated

== Scottish Championship ==
Pos	Team	Pld	W	D	L	GF	GA	GD	Pts	Promotion, qualification or relegation
1	Heart of Midlothian (C, P)	36	29	4	3	96	26	+70	91	Promotion to the Premiership
2	Hibernian	36	21	7	8	70	32	+38	70	Qualification for the Premiership play-off semi-final
3	Rangers	36	19	10	7	69	39	+30	67	Qualification for the Premiership play-off quarter-final
4	Queen of the South	36	17	9	10	58	41	+17	60	Qualification for the Premiership play-off quarter-final
5	Falkirk	36	14	11	11	48	48	0	53	
6	Raith Rovers	36	12	7	17	42	65	−23	43	
7	Dumbarton	36	9	7	20	36	79	−43	34	
8	Livingston (Note: Livingston were deducted 5 points due to failure of tax payments.)	36	8	8	20	41	53	−12	27	
9	Alloa Athletic (O)	36	6	9	21	34	56	−22	27	Qualification for the Championship play-offs
10	Cowdenbeath (R)	36	7	4	25	31	86	−55	25	Relegation to League One

Source: Soccerway
Rules for classification: 1) Points; 2) Goal difference; 3) Number of goals scored
(C) Champions; (O) Play-off winners; (P) Promoted; (R) Relegated

== Scottish League One ==
Pos	Team	Pld	W	D	L	GF	GA	GD	Pts	Promotion or relegation
1	Greenock Morton (C, P)	36	22	3	11	65	40	+25	69	Promotion to the Championship
2	Stranraer	36	20	7	9	59	38	+21	67	Qualification for the Championship play-offs
3	Forfar Athletic	36	20	6	10	59	43	+16	66	Qualification for the Championship play-offs
4	Brechin City	36	15	14	7	58	46	+12	59	Qualification for the Championship play-offs
5	Airdrieonians	36	16	10	10	53	39	+14	58	
6	Peterhead	36	14	9	13	51	54	−3	51	
7	Dunfermline Athletic	36	13	9	14	46	48	−2	48	
8	Ayr United	36	9	7	20	45	60	−15	34	
9	Stenhousemuir (O)	36	8	5	23	42	63	−21	29	Qualification for the League One play-offs
10	Stirling Albion (R)	36	4	8	24	35	84	−49	20	Relegation to League Two

Source: SPFL
Rules for classification: 1) points; 2) goal difference; 3) number of goals scored.
(C) Champions; (O) Play-off winners; (P) Promoted; (R) Relegated

== Scottish League Two ==
Pos	Team	Pld	W	D	L	GF	GA	GD	Pts	Promotion or relegation
1	Albion Rovers (C, P)	36	22	5	9	61	33	+28	71	Promotion to League One
2	Queen's Park	36	17	10	9	51	34	+17	61	Qualification for the League One play-offs
3	Arbroath	36	16	8	12	65	46	+19	56	Qualification for the League One play-offs
4	East Fife	36	15	8	13	56	48	+8	53	Qualification for the League One play-offs
5	Annan Athletic	36	14	8	14	56	56	0	50	
6	Clyde	36	13	8	15	40	50	−10	47	
7	Elgin City	36	12	9	15	55	58	−3	45	
8	Berwick Rangers	36	11	10	15	60	57	+3	43	
9	East Stirlingshire	36	13	4	19	40	66	−26	43	
10	Montrose (O)	36	9	6	21	42	78	−36	33	Qualification for the League Two play-off final

Source: SPFL
Rules for classification: 1) points; 2) goal difference; 3) number of goals scored.
(C) Champions; (O) Play-off winners; (P) Promoted

== Award winners ==
Month	SPFL Player	SPFL Young Player	Premiership Manager	Championship Manager	League One Manager	League Two Manager	Ref
August	Ross Draper (Inverness CT)	Ryan Christie (Inverness CT)	John Hughes (Inverness CT)	Robbie Neilson (Heart of Midlothian)	Mark Roberts (Ayr United)	Allan Moore (Arbroath)	
September	Paul Paton (Dundee United)	Jason Cummings (Hibernian)	Allan Johnston (Kilmarnock)	Alan Stubbs (Hibernian)	Stephen Aitken (Stranraer)	Gary Naysmith (East Fife)	
October	John Guidetti (Celtic)	Lewis Macleod (Rangers)	Alex Neil (Hamilton Academical)	Robbie Neilson (Heart of Midlothian)	Dick Campbell (Forfar Athletic)	Gus MacPherson (Queen's Park)	
November	David Clarkson (Dundee)	Charlie Telfer (Dundee United)	Ronny Deila (Celtic)	Robbie Neilson (Heart of Midlothian)	Jim Duffy (Greenock Morton)	Darren Young (Albion Rovers)	
December	Ryan Jack (Aberdeen)	Stevie Mallan (St Mirren)	Derek McInnes (Aberdeen)	Peter Houston (Falkirk)	Gary Bollan (Airdrieonians)	Allan Moore (Arbroath)	
January	Greg Stewart (Dundee)	Chris Kane (St Johnstone)	John Hughes (Inverness CT)	Peter Houston (Falkirk)	Ray McKinnon (Brechin City)	Jim Weir (Elgin City)	
February	Stefan Johansen (Celtic)	Ryan Christie (Inverness CT)	Jim McIntyre (Ross County)	Alan Stubbs (Hibernian)	Ray McKinnon (Brechin City)	Gary Naysmith (East Fife)	
March	Raffaelle De Vita (Ross County)	Jason Denayer (Celtic)	Jim McIntyre (Ross County)	Robbie Neilson (Heart of Midlothian)	Dick Campbell (Forfar Athletic)	Craig Tully (East Stirlingshire)	
April	Leigh Griffiths (Celtic)	Jason Cummings (Hibernian)	Ronny Deila (Celtic)	James Fowler (Queen of the South)	Ray McKinnon (Brechin City)	Paul Hegarty (Montrose)	

== See also ==
- 2014–15 in Scottish football
