= 2022–23 Scottish Professional Football League =

Scottish Professional Football League
- Season: 2022–23

Statistics of the Scottish Professional Football League (SPFL) in season 2022–23.

== Scottish Premiership ==
Pos	Team	Pld	W	D	L	GF	GA	GD	Pts	Qualification or relegation (Note: Teams play each other three times (33 matches), before the league is split into two groups (the top six and the bottom six).)
1	Celtic (C)	38	32	3	3	114	34	+80	99	Qualification for the Champions League group stage
2	Rangers	38	29	5	4	93	37	+56	92	Qualification for the Champions League third qualifying round
3	Aberdeen	38	18	3	17	56	60	−4	57	Qualification for the Europa League play-off round
4	Heart of Midlothian	38	15	9	14	63	57	+6	54	Qualification for the Europa Conference League third qualifying round
5	Hibernian	38	15	7	16	57	59	−2	52	Qualification for the Europa Conference League second qualifying round
6	St Mirren	38	12	10	16	43	61	−18	46	
7	Motherwell	38	14	8	16	53	51	+2	50	
8	Livingston	38	13	7	18	36	60	−24	46	
9	St Johnstone	38	12	7	19	41	59	−18	43	
10	Kilmarnock	38	11	7	20	37	62	−25	40	
11	Ross County (O)	38	9	7	22	37	60	−23	34	Qualification for the Premiership play-off final
12	Dundee United (R)	38	8	7	23	40	70	−30	31	Relegation to Championship

Rules for classification: 1) Points; 2) Goal difference; 3) Goals scored; 4) Head-to-Head points; 5) Head-to-Head goal difference; 6) Play-off (only if deciding champion, UEFA competitions qualification, second stage group allocation or relegation).
(C) Champions; (O) Play-off winners; (R) Relegated

== Scottish Championship ==
Pos	Team	Pld	W	D	L	GF	GA	GD	Pts	Promotion, qualification or relegation
1	Dundee (C, P)	36	17	12	7	66	40	+26	63	Promotion to the Premiership
2	Ayr United	36	16	10	10	61	43	+18	58	Qualification for the Premiership play-off semi-final
3	Queen's Park	36	17	7	12	63	52	+11	58	Qualification for the Premiership play-off quarter-final
4	Partick Thistle	36	16	9	11	65	45	+20	57	Qualification for the Premiership play-off quarter-final
5	Greenock Morton	36	15	12	9	53	43	+10	57	
6	Inverness Caledonian Thistle	36	15	10	11	52	47	+5	55	
7	Raith Rovers	36	11	10	15	46	49	−3	43	
8	Arbroath	36	6	16	14	29	47	−18	34	
9	Hamilton Academical (R)	36	7	10	19	31	63	−32	31	Qualification for the Championship play-offs
10	Cove Rangers (R)	36	7	10	19	38	75	−37	31	Relegation to League One

Rules for classification: 1) Points; 2) Goal difference; 3) Goals scored; 4) Head-to-to head points; 5) Head-to-head goal difference; 6) Play-off (only for deciding promotion, play-off participation and relegation).
(C) Champions; (P) Promoted; (R) Relegated

== Scottish League One ==
Pos	Team	Pld	W	D	L	GF	GA	GD	Pts	Promotion, qualification or relegation
1	Dunfermline Athletic (C, P)	36	23	12	1	63	21	+42	81	Promotion to the Championship
2	Falkirk	36	19	10	7	70	39	+31	67	Qualification for the Championship play-offs
3	Airdrieonians (O, P)	36	17	9	10	82	51	+31	60	Qualification for the Championship play-offs
4	Alloa Athletic	36	17	6	13	56	47	+9	57	Qualification for the Championship play-offs
5	Queen of the South	36	16	6	14	59	59	0	54	
6	Edinburgh	36	15	6	15	60	55	+5	51	
7	Montrose	36	13	9	14	50	55	−5	48	
8	Kelty Hearts	36	10	10	16	39	54	−15	40	
9	Clyde (R)	36	5	9	22	35	68	−33	24	Qualification for the League One play-offs
10	Peterhead (R)	36	3	7	26	19	84	−65	16	Relegation to League Two

Rules for classification: 1) Points; 2) Goal difference; 3) Goals scored; 4) Head-to-to head points; 5) Head-to-head goal difference; 6) Play-off (only for deciding promotion, play-off participation and relegation).
(C) Champions; (O) Play-off winners; (P) Promoted; (R) Relegated

== Scottish League Two ==
Pos	Team	Pld	W	D	L	GF	GA	GD	Pts	Promotion, qualification or relegation
1	Stirling Albion (C, P)	36	21	10	5	67	37	+30	73	Promotion to League One
2	Dumbarton	36	18	8	10	49	39	+10	62	Qualification for the League One play-offs
3	Annan Athletic (O, P)	36	14	9	13	61	51	+10	51	Qualification for the League One play-offs
4	East Fife	36	14	8	14	54	50	+4	50	Qualification for the League One play-offs
5	Forfar Athletic	36	13	9	14	37	43	−6	48	
6	Stenhousemuir	36	12	11	13	51	55	−4	47	
7	Stranraer	36	12	9	15	43	57	−14	45	
8	Bonnyrigg Rose	36	11	9	16	36	47	−11	42	
9	Elgin City	36	11	7	18	44	62	−18	40	
10	Albion Rovers (R)	36	11	6	19	47	48	−1	39	Qualification for the League Two play-off final

Rules for classification: 1) Points; 2) Goal difference; 3) Goals scored; 4) Head-to-to head points; 5) Head-to-head goal difference; 6) Play-off (only for deciding promotion, play-off participation and relegation).
(C) Champions; (O) Play-off winners; (P) Promoted; (R) Relegated

== Award winners ==
=== Monthly ===
Month	Premiership player	Championship player	League One player	League Two player	Premiership manager	Championship manager	League One manager	League Two manager	Ref
August	Kyogo Furuhashi (Celtic)	Dipo Akinyemi (Ayr United)	Calum Gallagher (Airdrieonians)	Declan Byrne (Dumbarton)	Ange Postecoglou (Celtic)	Lee Bullen (Ayr United)	Rhys McCabe (Airdrieonians)	Stevie Farrell (Dumbarton)	
September / October	Antonio Čolak (Rangers)	Robbie Muirhead (Greenock Morton)	Danny Handling (Edinburgh)	Kane Hester (Elgin City)	Ange Postecoglou (Celtic)	Dougie Imrie (Greenock Morton)	James McPake (Dunfermline Athletic)	Darren Young (Stirling Albion)	
November	Sead Hakšabanović (Celtic)	Paul McMullan (Dundee)	Jordan Allan (Clyde)	Charlie Reilly (Albion Rovers)	David Martindale (Livingston)	Gary Bowyer (Dundee)	James McPake (Dunfermline Athletic)	Stevie Farrell (Dumbarton)	
December	Kyogo Furuhashi (Celtic)	Grant Savoury (Queen's Park)	John Robertson (Edinburgh)	Chris Johnston (Annan Athletic)	Michael Beale (Rangers)	Owen Coyle (Queen's Park)	Alan Maybury (Edinburgh)	Stevie Farrell (Dumbarton)	
January	Kevin Nisbet (Hibernian)	Billy Mckay (Inverness CT)	Callumn Morrison (Falkirk)	Charlie Reilly (Albion Rovers)	Robbie Neilson (Heart of Midlothian)	Billy Dodds (Inverness CT)	John McGlynn (Falkirk)	Ray McKinnon (Forfar Athletic)	
February	Reo Hatate (Celtic)	Connor Shields (Queen's Park)	Kyle Benedictus (Dunfermline Athletic)	Matty Yates (Stenhousemuir)	Stuart Kettlewell (Motherwell)	Dougie Imrie (Greenock Morton)	John McGlynn (Falkirk)	Gary Naysmith (Stenhousemuir)	
March	Duk (Aberdeen)	Dipo Akinyemi (Ayr United)	Gabby McGill (Airdrieonians)	Tommy Goss (Annan Athletic)	Barry Robson (Aberdeen)	Gary Bowyer (Dundee)	Marvin Bartley; Queen of the South	Greig McDonald (East Fife)	
April	Kevin van Veen (Motherwell)	Kyle Turner (Partick Thistle)	Craig Wighton (Dunfermline Athletic)	Dale Carrick (Stirling Albion)	Barry Robson (Aberdeen)	Billy Dodds (Inverness CT)	James McPake (Dunfermline Athletic)	Darren Young (Stirling Albion)	

== See also ==
- 2022–23 in Scottish football
