= 2020–21 Scottish Professional Football League =

Scottish Professional Football League
- Season: 2020–21

Statistics of the Scottish Professional Football League (SPFL) in season 2020–21.

== Scottish Premiership ==
Pos	Team	Pld	W	D	L	GF	GA	GD	Pts	Qualification or relegation (Note: Teams play each other three times (33 matches), before the league is split into two groups (the top six and the bottom six).)
1	Rangers (C)	38	32	6	0	92	13	+79	102	Qualification for the Champions League third qualifying round
2	Celtic	38	22	11	5	78	29	+49	77	Qualification for the Champions League second qualifying round
3	Hibernian	38	18	9	11	48	35	+13	63	Qualification for the Europa Conference League second qualifying round
4	Aberdeen	38	15	11	12	36	38	−2	56	Qualification for the Europa Conference League second qualifying round
5	St Johnstone	38	11	12	15	36	46	−10	45	Qualification for the Europa League third qualifying round (Note: St Johnstone qualified as the 2020–21 Scottish Cup winners.)
6	Livingston	38	12	9	17	42	54	−12	45	
7	St Mirren	38	11	12	15	37	45	−8	45	
8	Motherwell	38	12	9	17	39	55	−16	45	
9	Dundee United	38	10	14	14	32	50	−18	44	
10	Ross County	38	11	6	21	35	66	−31	39	
11	Kilmarnock (R)	38	10	6	22	43	54	−11	36	Qualification for the Premiership play-off final
12	Hamilton Academical (R)	38	7	9	22	34	67	−33	30	Relegation to Championship

Rules for classification: 1) Points; 2) Goal difference; 3) Goals scored; 4) Head-to-head points; 5) Head-to-Head goal difference; 6) Play-off (only if deciding champion, UEFA competitions qualification, second stage group allocation or relegation).
(C) Champions; (R) Relegated

== Scottish Championship ==
Pos	Team	Pld	W	D	L	GF	GA	GD	Pts	Promotion, qualification or relegation
1	Heart of Midlothian (C, P)	27	17	6	4	63	24	+39	57	Promotion to the Premiership
2	Dundee (O, P)	27	12	9	6	49	40	+9	45	Qualification for the Premiership play-off semi-final
3	Raith Rovers	27	12	7	8	45	36	+9	43	Qualification for the Premiership play-off quarter-final
4	Dunfermline Athletic	27	10	9	8	38	34	+4	39	Qualification for the Premiership play-off quarter-final
5	Inverness Caledonian Thistle	27	8	12	7	36	31	+5	36	
6	Queen of the South	27	9	5	13	38	51	−13	32	
7	Arbroath	27	7	9	11	28	34	−6	30	
8	Ayr United	27	6	11	10	31	37	−6	29	
9	Greenock Morton (O)	27	6	11	10	22	33	−11	29	Qualification for the Championship play-offs
10	Alloa Athletic (R)	27	5	7	15	30	60	−30	22	Relegation to League One

Source: SPFL
Rules for classification: 1) Points; 2) Goal difference; 3) Goals scored; 4) Head-to-to head points; 5) Head-to-head goal difference; 6) Play-off (only for deciding promotion, play-off participation and relegation).
(C) Champions; (O) Play-off winners; (P) Promoted; (R) Relegated

== Scottish League One ==
Pos	Team	Pld	W	D	L	GF	GA	GD	Pts	Promotion, qualification or relegation
1	Partick Thistle (C, P)	22	11	7	4	40	18	+22	40	Promotion to the Championship
2	Airdrieonians	22	12	2	8	35	24	+11	38	Qualification for the Championship play-offs
3	Cove Rangers	22	10	6	6	28	18	+10	36	Qualification for the Championship play-offs
4	Montrose	22	9	6	7	33	33	0	33	Qualification for the Championship play-offs
5	Falkirk	22	9	5	8	29	26	+3	32	
6	East Fife	22	10	3	9	30	33	−3	33	
7	Peterhead	22	9	2	11	24	27	−3	29	
8	Clyde	22	8	2	12	27	38	−11	26	
9	Dumbarton (O)	22	7	4	11	14	24	−10	25	Qualification for the League One play-offs
10	Forfar Athletic (R)	22	4	5	13	18	37	−19	17	Relegation to League Two

Source: SPFL
Rules for classification: 1) Points; 2) Goal difference; 3) Goals scored; 4) Head-to-to head points; 5) Head-to-head goal difference; 6) Play-off (only for deciding promotion, play-off participation and relegation).
(C) Champions; (O) Play-off winners; (P) Promoted; (R) Relegated

== Scottish League Two ==
Pos	Team	Pld	W	D	L	GF	GA	GD	Pts	Promotion, qualification or relegation
1	Queen's Park (C, P)	22	17	3	2	43	13	+30	54	Promotion to League One
2	Edinburgh City	22	12	2	8	40	27	+13	38	Qualification for the League One play-offs
3	Elgin City	22	12	2	8	39	28	+11	38	Qualification for the League One play-offs
4	Stranraer	22	11	5	6	36	25	+11	38	Qualification for the League One play-offs
5	Stirling Albion	22	10	6	6	32	22	+10	36	
6	Stenhousemuir	22	7	5	10	25	35	−10	26	
7	Albion Rovers	22	7	4	11	25	38	−13	25	
8	Annan Athletic	22	5	7	10	25	27	−2	22	
9	Cowdenbeath	22	5	6	11	15	32	−17	21	
10	Brechin City (R)	22	2	4	16	13	46	−33	10	Qualification for the League Two play-off final

Source: SPFL
Rules for classification: 1) Points; 2) Goal difference; 3) Goals scored; 4) Head-to-to head points; 5) Head-to-head goal difference; 6) Play-off (only for deciding promotion, play-off participation and relegation).
(C) Champions; (P) Promoted; (R) Relegated

== Award winners ==
=== Yearly ===
Division	Manager of Season		Player of Season	
Division	Winner	Club	Winner	Club
Premiership	Steven Gerrard	Rangers	Allan McGregor	Rangers
Championship	James McPake	Dundee	Charlie Adam	Dundee
League One	Ian McCall	Partick Thistle	not awarded	
League Two	Ray McKinnon	Queen's Park	Michael Doyle	Queen's Park

=== Monthly ===
Month	Premiership player	Championship player	League One player	League Two player	Premiership manager	Championship manager	League One manager	League Two manager	Ref
August	Ryan Kent (Rangers)	—	—	—	Steven Gerrard (Rangers)	—	—	—	
September	James Tavernier (Rangers)	—	—	—	Neil Lennon (Celtic)	—	—	—	
October	Connor Goldson (Rangers)	Euan Murray (Dunfermline Athletic)	Stuart McKenzie (Cove Rangers)	Willie Muir (Queen's Park)	Steven Gerrard (Rangers)	Stevie Crawford (Dunfermline Athletic)	Paul Hartley (Cove Rangers)	Ray McKinnon (Queen's Park)	
November	James Tavernier (Rangers)	Kyle Turner (Dunfermline Athletic)	Thomas Robert (Airdrieonians)	Darryl Duffy (Stranraer)	Steven Gerrard (Rangers)	Stevie Crawford (Dunfermline Athletic)	Lee Miller & David McCracken (Falkirk)	Stephen Farrell (Stranraer)	
December	David Turnbull (Celtic)	Charlie Adam (Dundee)	Jack Hamilton (East Fife)	Andy Ryan (Stirling Albion)	David Martindale (Livingston)	Robbie Neilson (Heart of Midlothian)	Stewart Petrie (Montrose)	Kevin Rutkiewicz (Stirling Albion)	
January	Scott Robinson (Livingston)	Connor Shields (Queen of the South)	—	—	David Martindale (Livingston)	Allan Johnston (Queen of the South)	—	—	
February	Odsonne Édouard (Celtic)	Willie Gibson (Queen of the South)	—	—	Steven Gerrard (Rangers)	Dick Campbell (Arbroath)	—	—	
March	Alfredo Morelos (Rangers)	David Carson (Inverness CT)	Graham Webster (Montrose)	Raffaele De Vita (Edinburgh City)	Callum Davidson (St Johnstone)	James McPake (Dundee)	Lee Miller & David McCracken (Falkirk)	Gary Naysmith (Edinburgh City)	
April	Kyle Lafferty (Kilmarnock)	Jack Hamilton (Arbroath)	Scott Tiffoney (Partick Thistle)	Matthew Aitken (Albion Rovers)	Graham Alexander ( Motherwell)	Robbie Neilson (Heart of Midlothian)	Ian McCall (Partick Thistle)	Brian Reid (Albion Rovers)	

== See also ==
- 2020–21 in Scottish football
