= Longmuir =

Longmuir is a surname. Notable people with the surname include:

- Alan Longmuir (1948–2018), Scottish bass guitarist
- Bill Longmuir (born 1953), British golfer
- David Longmuir, head of the Scottish Football League
- Derek Longmuir (born 1951), Scottish drummer
- James Longmuir, Church of Scotland minister
- John Longmuir (poet) (1803–1883), Scottish minister, antiquary, poet and lexicographer
- John Longmuir (tenor), Scottish-born Australian tenor
- Justin Longmuir (born 1981), Australian rules footballer
- Troy Longmuir (born 1979), Australian rules footballer
