= 2017–18 Scottish Professional Football League =

Scottish Professional Football League
- Season: 2017–18

Statistics of the Scottish Professional Football League (SPFL) in season 2017–18.

== Scottish Premiership ==
Pos	Team	Pld	W	D	L	GF	GA	GD	Pts	Qualification or relegation (Note: Teams play each other three times (33 matches) before the league is split into two groups (the top six and the bottom six).)
1	Celtic (C)	38	24	10	4	73	25	+48	82	Qualification for the Champions League first qualifying round (Note: Since the winners of the 2017–18 Scottish Cup, Celtic, qualified for European competition based on league position, the spot awarded to the Scottish Cup winners (Europa League second qualifying round) was passed to the second-placed team and the spot awarded to the second-placed team (Europa League first qualifying round) was passed to the fourth-placed team.)
2	Aberdeen	38	22	7	9	56	37	+19	73	Qualification for the Europa League second qualifying round
3	Rangers	38	21	7	10	76	50	+26	70	Qualification for the Europa League first qualifying round
4	Hibernian	38	18	13	7	62	46	+16	67	Qualification for the Europa League first qualifying round
5	Kilmarnock	38	16	11	11	49	47	+2	59	
6	Heart of Midlothian	38	12	13	13	39	39	0	49	
7	Motherwell	38	13	9	16	43	49	−6	48	
8	St Johnstone	38	12	10	16	42	53	−11	46	
9	Dundee	38	11	6	21	36	57	−21	39	
10	Hamilton Academical	38	9	6	23	47	68	−21	33	
11	Partick Thistle (R)	38	8	9	21	31	61	−30	33	Qualification for the Premiership play-off final
12	Ross County (R)	38	6	11	21	40	62	−22	29	Relegation to the Championship

Source: Soccerway BBC
Rules for classification: 1) Points; 2) Goal difference; 3) Goals scored; 4) Play-off (only if deciding champion, UEFA competitions qualification and second-stage group allocation).
(C) Champions; (R) Relegated

== Scottish Championship ==
Pos	Team	Pld	W	D	L	GF	GA	GD	Pts	Promotion, qualification or relegation
1	St Mirren (C, P)	36	23	5	8	63	36	+27	74	Promotion to the Premiership
2	Livingston (O, P)	36	17	11	8	56	37	+19	62	Qualification for the Premiership play-off semi-final
3	Dundee United	36	18	7	11	52	42	+10	61	Qualification for the Premiership play-off quarter-final
4	Dunfermline Athletic	36	16	11	9	60	35	+25	59	Qualification for the Premiership play-off quarter-final
5	Inverness Caledonian Thistle	36	16	9	11	53	37	+16	57	
6	Queen of the South	36	14	10	12	59	53	+6	52	
7	Greenock Morton	36	13	11	12	47	40	+7	50	
8	Falkirk	36	12	11	13	45	49	−4	47	
9	Dumbarton (R)	36	7	9	20	27	63	−36	30	Qualification for the Championship play-offs
10	Brechin City (R)	36	0	4	32	20	90	−70	4	Relegation to League One

Source: Soccerway
Rules for classification: 1) Points; 2) Goal difference; 3) Goals scored; 4) Points in head-to-head matches; 5) Goal difference in hth matches; 6). Goals scored in hth matches; 7). Play-off (only for deciding promotion, play-off participation and relegation).
(C) Champions; (O) Play-off winners; (P) Promoted; (R) Relegated

== Scottish League One ==
Pos	Team	Pld	W	D	L	GF	GA	GD	Pts	Promotion, qualification or relegation
1	Ayr United (C, P)	36	24	4	8	92	42	+50	76	Promotion to the Championship
2	Raith Rovers	36	22	9	5	68	32	+36	75	Qualification for the Championship play-offs
3	Alloa Athletic (O, P)	36	17	9	10	56	43	+13	60	Qualification for the Championship play-offs
4	Arbroath	36	17	8	11	70	51	+19	59	Qualification for the Championship play-offs
5	Stranraer	36	16	5	15	58	66	−8	53	
6	East Fife	36	13	3	20	49	67	−18	42	
7	Airdrieonians	36	10	11	15	46	60	−14	41	
8	Forfar Athletic	36	11	5	20	40	65	−25	38	
9	Queen's Park (R)	36	7	10	19	42	72	−30	31	Qualification for the League One play-offs
10	Albion Rovers (R)	36	8	6	22	57	80	−23	30	Relegation to League Two

Source: SPFL
Rules for classification: 1) Points; 2) Goal difference; 3) Number of goals scored
(C) Champions; (O) Play-off winners; (P) Promoted; (R) Relegated

== Scottish League Two ==
Pos	Team	Pld	W	D	L	GF	GA	GD	Pts	Promotion, qualification or relegation
1	Montrose (C, P)	36	23	8	5	60	35	+25	77	Promotion to League One
2	Peterhead	36	24	4	8	79	39	+40	76	Qualification for the League One play-offs
3	Stirling Albion	36	16	7	13	61	52	+9	55	Qualification for the League One play-offs
4	Stenhousemuir (O, P)	36	15	9	12	56	47	+9	54	Qualification for the League One play-offs
5	Clyde	36	14	9	13	52	50	+2	51	
6	Elgin City	36	14	7	15	54	61	−7	49	
7	Annan Athletic	36	12	11	13	49	41	+8	47	
8	Berwick Rangers	36	9	10	17	31	59	−28	37	
9	Edinburgh City	36	7	9	20	37	62	−25	30	
10	Cowdenbeath (O)	36	4	10	22	23	56	−33	22	Qualification for the League Two play-off final

Source: SPFL
Rules for classification: 1) Points; 2) Goal difference; 3) Number of goals scored
(C) Champions; (O) Play-off winners; (P) Promoted

== Award winners ==
=== Yearly ===
Division	Manager of Season		Player of Season	
Division	Winner	Club	Winner	Club
Premiership	Brendan Rodgers	Celtic	Scott Brown	Celtic
Championship	Jack Ross	St Mirren	Lewis Morgan	St Mirren
League One	Ian McCall	Ayr United	Lawrence Shankland	Ayr United
League Two	Stewart Petrie	Montrose	Seán Dillon	Montrose

=== Monthly ===
Month	Premiership player	Championship player	League One player	League Two player	Premiership manager	Championship manager	League One manager	League Two manager	Ref
August	Michael O'Halloran (St Johnstone)	Joe Cardle (Dunfermline Athletic)	Lewis Vaughan (Raith Rovers)	Darren Smith (Stirling Albion)	Tommy Wright (St Johnstone)	Allan Johnston (Dunfermline Athletic)	Barry Smith (Raith Rovers)	Dave Mackay (Stirling Albion)	
September	Louis Moult (Motherwell)	Lewis Morgan (St Mirren)	Ryan McCord (Arbroath)	Mark McGuigan (Stenhousemuir)	Brendan Rodgers (Celtic)	David Hopkin (Livingston)	Brian Kerr (Albion Rovers)	Brown Ferguson (Stenhousemuir)	
October	Kieran Tierney (Celtic)	Carl Tremarco (Inverness CT)	Michael Moffat (Ayr United)	Craig Johnston (Montrose)	Neil Lennon (Hibernian)	John Robertson (Inverness CT)	Ian McCall (Ayr United)	Gavin Price (Elgin City)	
November	David Templeton (Hamilton Academical)	Scott Fraser (Dundee United)	Lawrence Shankland (Ayr United)	Cammy Ballantyne (Montrose)	Martin Canning (Hamilton Academical)	Stephen Aitken (Dumbarton)	Ian McCall (Ayr United)	Stewart Petrie (Montrose)	
December	Kris Boyd (Kilmarnock)	Stephen Dobbie (Queen of the South)	Alan Trouten (Albion Rovers)	Rory McAllister (Peterhead)	Steve Clarke (Kilmarnock)	Jack Ross (St Mirren)	Barry Smith (Raith Rovers)	Jim McInally (Peterhead)	
January	No award, due to winter break	Stephen McGinn (St Mirren)	Angus Beith (Stranraer)	Darren Smith (Stirling Albion)	No award, due to winter break	Jack Ross (St Mirren)	Dick Campbell (Arbroath)	Jim McInally (Peterhead)	
February	Josh Windass (Rangers)	Ryan Hardie (Livingston)	Willis Furtado (Raith Rovers)	Peter MacDonald (Stirling Albion)	Steve Clarke (Kilmarnock)	David Hopkin (Livingston)	Dick Campbell (Arbroath)	Dave Mackay (Stirling Albion)	
March	Stephen O'Donnell (Kilmarnock)	Nicky Clark (Dunfermline Athletic)	Lawrence Shankland (Ayr United)	Chris McStay (Clyde)	Steve Clarke (Kilmarnock)	Jack Ross (St Mirren)	Ian McCall (Ayr United)	Danny Lennon (Clyde)	

== See also ==
- 2017–18 in Scottish football
