= Ray McKinnon =

Ray McKinnon may refer to:

- Ray McKinnon (actor) (born 1957), American actor
- Ray McKinnon (footballer) (born 1970), Scottish football manager and former player
