= 2018–19 Scottish Professional Football League =

Scottish Professional Football League
- Season: 2018–19

Statistics of the Scottish Professional Football League (SPFL) in season 2018–19.

== Scottish Premiership ==
Pos	Team	Pld	W	D	L	GF	GA	GD	Pts	Qualification or relegation (Note: Teams play each other three times (33 matches), before the league is split into two groups (the top six and the bottom six).)
1	Celtic (C)	38	27	6	5	77	20	+57	87	Qualification for the Champions League first qualifying round
2	Rangers	38	23	9	6	82	27	+55	78	Qualification for the Europa League first qualifying round
3	Kilmarnock	38	19	10	9	50	31	+19	67	Qualification for the Europa League first qualifying round
4	Aberdeen	38	20	7	11	57	44	+13	67	Qualification for the Europa League first qualifying round
5	Hibernian	38	14	12	12	51	39	+12	54	
6	Heart of Midlothian	38	15	6	17	42	50	−8	51	
7	St Johnstone	38	15	7	16	38	48	−10	52	
8	Motherwell	38	15	6	17	46	56	−10	51	
9	Livingston	38	11	11	16	42	44	−2	44	
10	Hamilton Academical	38	9	6	23	28	75	−47	33	
11	St Mirren (O)	38	8	8	22	34	66	−32	32	Qualification for the Premiership play-off final
12	Dundee (R)	38	5	6	27	31	78	−47	21	Relegation to the Championship

Source: Soccerway BBC SPFL
Rules for classification: 1) Points; 2) Goal difference; 3) Goals scored; 4) Play-off (only if deciding champion, UEFA competitions qualification and second stage group allocation).
(C) Champions; (O) Play-off winners; (R) Relegated

== Scottish Championship ==
Pos	Team	Pld	W	D	L	GF	GA	GD	Pts	Promotion, qualification or relegation
1	Ross County (C, P)	36	21	8	7	63	34	+29	71	Promotion to the Premiership
2	Dundee United	36	19	8	9	49	40	+9	65	Qualification for the Premiership play-off semi-final
3	Inverness Caledonian Thistle	36	14	14	8	48	40	+8	56	Qualification for the Premiership play-off quarter-final
4	Ayr United	36	15	9	12	50	38	+12	54	Qualification for the Premiership play-off quarter-final
5	Greenock Morton	36	11	13	12	36	45	−9	46	
6	Partick Thistle	36	12	7	17	43	52	−9	43	
7	Dunfermline Athletic	36	11	8	17	33	40	−7	41	
8	Alloa Athletic	36	10	9	17	39	53	−14	39	
9	Queen of the South (O)	36	9	11	16	41	48	−7	38	Qualification for the Championship play-offs
10	Falkirk (R)	36	9	11	16	37	49	−12	38	Relegation to League One

Source: SPFL
Rules for classification: 1) Points; 2) Goal difference; 3) Goals scored; 4) Points in head-to-head matches; 5) Goal difference in hth matches; 6). Goals scored in hth matches; 7). Play-off (only for deciding promotion, play-off participation and relegation).
(C) Champions; (O) Play-off winners; (P) Promoted; (R) Relegated

== Scottish League One ==
Pos	Team	Pld	W	D	L	GF	GA	GD	Pts	Promotion, qualification or relegation
1	Arbroath (C, P)	36	20	10	6	63	38	+25	70	Promotion to the Championship
2	Forfar Athletic	36	19	6	11	54	47	+7	63	Qualification for the Championship play-offs
3	Raith Rovers	36	16	12	8	74	48	+26	60	Qualification for the Championship play-offs
4	Montrose	36	15	6	15	49	50	−1	51	Qualification for the Championship play-offs
5	Airdrieonians	36	14	6	16	51	44	+7	48	
6	Dumbarton	36	12	10	14	60	60	0	46	
7	East Fife	36	13	7	16	49	56	−7	46	
8	Stranraer	36	11	9	16	45	57	−12	42	
9	Stenhousemuir (R)	36	10	7	19	35	61	−26	37	Qualification for the League One play-offs
10	Brechin City (R)	36	9	9	18	42	61	−19	36	Relegation to League Two

Source: SPFL
Rules for classification: 1) Points; 2) Goal difference; 3) Number of goals scored
(C) Champions; (P) Promoted; (R) Relegated

== Scottish League Two ==
Pos	Team	Pld	W	D	L	GF	GA	GD	Pts	Promotion, qualification or relegation
1	Peterhead (C, P)	36	24	7	5	65	29	+36	79	Promotion to League One
2	Clyde (Note: Albion Rovers and Queen's Park were awarded 3–0 technical victories against Clyde in February 2019 after Clyde fielded an ineligible player. The original matches had finished 1–0 to Clyde and 1–1 respectively.) (O, P)	36	23	5	8	63	35	+28	74	Qualification for the League One play-offs
3	Edinburgh City	36	20	7	9	58	31	+27	67	Qualification for the League One play-offs
4	Annan Athletic	36	20	6	10	70	39	+31	66	Qualification for the League One play-offs
5	Stirling Albion	36	13	8	15	44	45	−1	47	
6	Cowdenbeath	36	12	7	17	46	46	0	43	
7	Queen's Park	36	11	10	15	44	47	−3	43	
8	Elgin City	36	13	4	19	52	67	−15	43	
9	Albion Rovers	36	7	6	23	32	71	−39	27	
10	Berwick Rangers (R)	36	5	4	27	27	91	−64	19	Qualification for the League Two play-off final

Source: SPFL
Rules for classification: 1) Points; 2) Goal difference; 3) Number of goals scored
(C) Champions; (O) Play-off winners; (P) Promoted; (R) Relegated

== Award winners ==
=== Yearly ===
Division	Manager of Season		Player of Season		Tartan Ball Winner	
Division	Winner	Club	Winner	Club	Winner	Club
Premiership	Steve Clarke	Kilmarnock	James Forrest	Celtic	Alfredo Morelos	Rangers
Championship	Steve Ferguson & Stuart Kettlewell	Ross County	Stephen Dobbie	Queen of the South	Lawrence Shankland	Ayr United
League One	Dick Campbell	Arbroath	Bobby Linn	Arbroath	Kevin Nisbet	Raith Rovers
League Two	Danny Lennon	Clyde	Blair Henderson	Edinburgh City	Blair Henderson	Edinburgh City

- Tarton Boot winner: Kevin Nisbet and Blair Henderson (shared as joint-highest goalscorers in the SPFL)
- The Tartan Ball was awarded to highest scorer in each division of the SPFL.

=== Monthly ===
Month	Premiership player	Championship player	League One player	League Two player	Premiership manager	Championship manager	League One manager	League Two manager	Ref
August	Tony Watt (St Johnstone)	Lawrence Shankland (Ayr United)	Ryan Wallace (Arbroath)	Rory McAllister (Peterhead)	Craig Levein (Heart of Midlothian)	Ian McCall (Ayr United)	Dick Campbell (Arbroath)	Peter Murphy (Annan Athletic)	
September	Steven Naismith (Heart of Midlothian)	Stephen Dobbie (Queen of the South)	Bobby Linn (Arbroath)	Conrad Balatoni (Edinburgh City)	Gary Holt (Livingston)	Steve Ferguson & Stuart Kettlewell (Ross County)	Darren Young (East Fife)	James McDonaugh (Edinburgh City)	
October	James Forrest (Celtic)	Billy Mckay (Ross County)	Kevin Nisbet (Raith Rovers)	Blair Henderson (Edinburgh City)	Brendan Rodgers (Celtic)	Steve Ferguson & Stuart Kettlewell (Ross County)	Dick Campbell (Arbroath)	Mark Roberts (Queen's Park)	
November	Ryan Christie (Celtic)	Fraser Aird (Dundee United)	Ricky Little (Arbroath)	Dylan Cogill (Clyde)	Tommy Wright (St Johnstone)	Robbie Neilson (Dundee United)	Dick Campbell (Arbroath)	Danny Lennon (Clyde)	
December	Sam Cosgrove (Aberdeen)	Dario Zanatta (Alloa Athletic)	Martin Rennie (Montrose)	Blair Henderson (Edinburgh City)	Derek McInnes (Aberdeen)	Jim Goodwin (Alloa Athletic)	Stewart Petrie (Montrose)	Jim McInally (Peterhead)	
January	No award, due to winter break	Stephen Dobbie (Queen of the South)	Anton Dowds (East Fife)	Peter MacDonald (Stirling Albion)	No award, due to winter break	Gary Naysmith (Queen of the South)	Jim Weir (Forfar Athletic)	Danny Lennon (Clyde)	
February	Jake Hastie (Motherwell)	Billy Mckay (Ross County)	Dom Thomas (Dumbarton)	Chris Johnston (Annan Athletic)	Stephen Robinson (Motherwell)	Stevie Crawford (Dunfermline Athletic)	Jim Duffy (Dumbarton)	Peter Murphy (Annan Athletic)	
March	Odsonne Édouard (Celtic)	Aaron Doran (Inverness CT)	Dale Hilson (Forfar Athletic)	Peter Morrison (Albion Rovers)	Paul Heckingbottom (Hibernian)	John Robertson (Inverness CT)	Jim Weir (Forfar Athletic)	Kevin Harper (Albion Rovers)	
April	Scott Arfield (Rangers)	Brian Graham (Ross County)	Calum Gallagher (Dumbarton)	Smart Osadolor (Albion Rovers)	Steven Gerrard (Rangers)	Steve Ferguson & Stuart Kettlewell (Ross County)	Jim Duffy (Dumbarton)	Danny Lennon (Clyde)	

== See also ==
- 2018–19 in Scottish football
