= 2025–26 Scottish Professional Football League =

Scottish Professional Football League
- Season: 2025–26

Statistics of the Scottish Professional Football League (SPFL) in season 2025–26.

== Scottish Premiership ==
Pos	Team	Pld	W	D	L	GF	GA	GD	Pts	Qualification or relegation (Note: Teams played each other three times (33 matches), before the league was split into two groups (the top six and the bottom six).)
1	Celtic (C)	38	26	4	8	73	41	+32	82	Qualification for the Champions League play-off round
2	Heart of Midlothian	38	24	8	6	67	34	+33	80	Qualification for the Champions League second qualifying round
3	Rangers	38	20	12	6	76	43	+33	72	Qualification for the Europa League third qualifying round (Note: Since the 2025–26 Scottish Cup winners, Celtic, qualified for the Champions League via league position, the spot reserved for the cup winners (Europa League third qualifying round) was passed to the third-placed team, and the spots for the Conference League second qualifying round were moved down one league position.)
4	Motherwell	38	16	13	9	59	36	+23	61	Qualification for the Conference League second qualifying round
5	Hibernian	38	15	12	11	58	44	+14	57	Qualification for the Conference League second qualifying round
6	Falkirk	38	14	7	17	50	62	−12	49	
7	Dundee United	38	10	15	13	49	60	−11	45	
8	Dundee	38	11	9	18	42	61	−19	42	
9	Aberdeen	38	11	7	20	40	55	−15	40	
10	Kilmarnock	38	10	10	18	50	68	−18	40	
11	St Mirren (O)	38	8	10	20	30	55	−25	34	Qualification for the Premiership play-off final
12	Livingston (R)	38	2	15	21	40	75	−35	21	Relegation to Championship

Rules for classification: 1) Points; 2) Goal difference; 3) Goals scored; 4) Head-to-head points; 5) Head-to-head goal difference; 6) Play-off (only if deciding champion, UEFA competition qualification, second stage group allocation, or relegation).
(C) Champions; (O) Play-off winners; (R) Relegated

== Scottish Championship ==
Pos	Team	Pld	W	D	L	GF	GA	GD	Pts	Promotion, qualification or relegation
1	St Johnstone (C, P)	36	22	11	3	67	25	+42	77	Promotion to the Premiership
2	Partick Thistle	36	17	15	4	53	36	+17	66	Qualification for the Premiership play-off semi-final
3	Arbroath	36	13	13	10	43	41	+2	52	Qualification for the Premiership play-off quarter-final
4	Dunfermline Athletic	36	14	9	13	52	41	+11	51	Qualification for the Premiership play-off quarter-final
5	Raith Rovers	36	12	9	15	43	42	+1	45	
6	Queen's Park	36	9	14	13	35	48	−13	41	
7	Ayr United	36	8	15	13	38	47	−9	39	
8	Greenock Morton	36	8	14	14	36	52	−16	38	
9	Airdrieonians (R)	36	8	12	16	35	49	−14	36	Qualification for the Championship play-offs
10	Ross County (R)	36	8	10	18	36	57	−21	34	Relegation to League One

Rules for classification: 1) Points; 2) Goal difference; 3) Goals scored; 4) Head-to head points; 5) Head-to-head goal difference; 6) Play-off (only for deciding promotion, play-off participation and relegation).
(C) Champions; (P) Promoted; (R) Relegated

== Scottish League One ==
Pos	Team	Pld	W	D	L	GF	GA	GD	Pts	Promotion, qualification or relegation
1	Inverness Caledonian Thistle (C, P)	36	21	11	4	60	24	+36	69 (Note: Inverness Caledonian Thistle were deducted five points for entering administration during the previous season.)	Promotion to the Championship
2	Stenhousemuir (O, P)	36	18	13	5	50	27	+23	67	Qualification for the Championship play-offs
3	Queen of the South	36	14	12	10	58	47	+11	54	Qualification for the Championship play-offs
4	Alloa Athletic	36	15	8	13	50	38	+12	53	Qualification for the Championship play-offs
5	Peterhead	36	12	7	17	48	64	−16	43	
6	Montrose	36	11	9	16	48	67	−19	42	
7	Cove Rangers	36	9	11	16	41	44	−3	38	
8	East Fife	36	9	9	18	34	61	−27	36	
9	Hamilton Academical (O)	36	16	7	13	54	42	+12	34 (Note: Hamilton Academical were deducted six points for breaching SPFL rules regarding amateur players, a further nine points for failing to hold at least a bronze level licence and then six more points for failing to pay players' wages on time.)	Qualification for the League One play-offs
10	Kelty Hearts (R)	36	6	11	19	33	62	−29	29	Relegation to League Two

Rules for classification: 1) Points; 2) Goal difference; 3) Goals scored; 4) Head-to-head points; 5) Head-to-head goal difference; 6) Play-off (only for deciding promotion, play-off participation and relegation).
(C) Champions; (O) Play-off winners; (P) Promoted; (R) Relegated

== Scottish League Two ==
Pos	Team	Pld	W	D	L	GF	GA	GD	Pts	Promotion, qualification or relegation
1	East Kilbride (C, P)	36	21	6	9	77	46	+31	69	Promotion to League One
2	The Spartans	36	18	10	8	60	39	+21	64	Qualification for the League One play-offs
3	Clyde	36	14	14	8	58	41	+17	56	Qualification for the League One play-offs
4	Forfar Athletic	36	13	11	12	51	47	+4	50	Qualification for the League One play-offs
5	Stranraer	36	12	11	13	46	46	0	47	
6	Elgin City	36	11	11	14	51	55	−4	44	
7	Annan Athletic	36	10	11	15	47	58	−11	41	
8	Stirling Albion	36	9	11	16	46	63	−17	38	
9	Dumbarton	36	10	10	16	47	61	−14	35 (Note: Dumbarton were deducted five points for entering administration during the previous season.)	
10	Edinburgh City (O)	36	10	9	17	45	72	−27	24 (Note: Edinburgh City were deducted 15 points due to an insolvency event.)	Qualification for the League Two play-off final

Rules for classification: 1) Points; 2) Goal difference; 3) Goals scored; 4) Head-to-head points; 5) Head-to-head goal difference; 6) Play-off (only for deciding promotion, play-off participation and relegation).
(C) Champions; (O) Play-off winners; (P) Promoted

== Award winners ==
Month	Premiership player	Championship player	League One player	League Two player	Premiership manager	Championship manager	League One manager	League Two manager	Ref
August	Ivan Dolček (Dundee United)	Josh McPake (St Johnstone)	Ross Munro (Inverness CT)	Robbie Mahon (Edinburgh City)	Derek McInnes (Heart of Midlothian)	Simo Valakari (St Johnstone)	Scott Kellacher (Inverness CT)	Mick Kennedy (East Kilbride)	
September	Lawrence Shankland (Heart of Midlothian)	Josh McPake (St Johnstone)	Oli Shaw (Hamilton Academical)	Marley Redfern (Clyde)	Derek McInnes (Heart of Midlothian)	Simo Valakari (St Johnstone)	Scott Kellacher (Inverness CT)	Darren Young (Clyde)	
October	Cláudio Braga (Heart of Midlothian)	Findlay Marshall (Arbroath)	Kieran Millar (East Fife)	Keith Watson (Annan Athletic)	Derek McInnes (Heart of Midlothian)	Mark Wilson (Partick Thistle)	Gary Naysmith (Stenhousemuir)	Willie Gibson (Annan Athletic)	
November	Tawanda Maswanhise (Motherwell)				Martin O'Neill (Celtic)	Mark Wilson (Partick Thistle)	Scott Kellacher (Inverness CT)	Allan Hale (Elgin City)	
December	Elliot Watt (Motherwell)				Jens Berthel Askou (Motherwell)				
January	Tawanda Maswanhise (Motherwell)				Danny Röhl (Rangers)				
February	Youssef Chermiti (Rangers)				Jens Berthel Askou (Motherwell)				
March	Barney Stewart (Falkirk)				Jim Goodwin (Dundee United)				
April	Will Ferry (Dundee United)				Martin O'Neill (Celtic)				

== See also ==
- 2025–26 in Scottish football
