= Scottish Professional Football League =

Association football league in Scotland

Scottish Professional Football League (SPFL)
- Founded: 2013
- Country: Scotland
- Confederation: UEFA
- Chairman: Murdoch MacLennan
- Chief Executive Officer: Neil Doncaster
- Divisions: Scottish Premiership; Scottish Championship; Scottish League One; Scottish League Two
- Number of clubs: 42
- Level on pyramid: 1–4
- Relegation to: Highland Football League; Lowland Football League
- Domestic cup(s): Scottish Cup; Scottish League Cup; Scottish Challenge Cup
- International cup(s): UEFA Champions League; UEFA Europa League; UEFA Europa Conference League
- Current champions: Celtic (2025–26)
- Most championships: Celtic (12 titles) (Note: The SPFL has only existed since 2013. For a complete record of clubs that have won Scottish league championships, see List of Scottish football champions.)
- Broadcasters: Sky Sports; Premier Sports; BBC Scotland; BBC Alba; CBS Sports/Paramount+(US)
- Website: spfl.co.uk
- Current: 2026–27 Scottish Professional Football League

The Scottish Professional Football League (SPFL) is the national men's association football league in Scotland. The league was formed in June 2013 following a merger between the Scottish Premier League and the Scottish Football League. As well as operating its league competition, which consists of the top four levels of the Scottish football league system, the SPFL also operates two domestic cup competitions, the Scottish League Cup and the Scottish Challenge Cup. While the Scottish Cup includes all the teams within the SPFL, the competition is run and organised by the Scottish Football Association.

== Background ==
A Scottish football league system was first created in 1890, when the Scottish Football League (SFL) was formed. Traditionally the league had a two divisional structure (Divisions One and Two) between which clubs were promoted and relegated at the end of each season. By the mid-1970s, this organisation was perceived to be stagnant, and it was decided to split into a three divisional structure: Premier Division (formerly Division One), First Division (formerly Division Two) and a newly added Second Division. This system came into force for the 1975–76 season. This setup continued until the 1994–95 season when a four divisional structure was introduced, along with a new Third Division, with all four divisions consisting of ten clubs.

On 8 September 1997, the Premier Division clubs decided to split from the Scottish Football League and form the Scottish Premier League (SPL), following the example of the English Premier League. This decision was fuelled by a desire by the top clubs in Scotland to control more of the revenue generated by the game and to negotiate its contracts with sponsors and broadcasters. SFL revenues had been divided proportionally between clubs in all four divisions. The SPL clubs retained all of its commercial revenues, except for an annual payment to the SFL and a parachute payment to any relegated clubs.

Scottish football began to think about changing its structures again in the late 2000s, as Scottish clubs and national teams were struggling in international competition and revenues were being greatly outgrown by the neighbouring English Premier League. A review, led by former First Minister of Scotland Henry McLeish, was conducted by the Scottish Football Association and its report was published in December 2010. McLeish recommended that Scottish football should have a single league body and that the top flight should be reduced to 10 clubs. The proposal to change the top flight numbers did not proceed because of opposition from four SPL clubs, with only two needed to block any change of that nature.

Talks continued about the proposed league merger. A proposal for a merged league body with a 12–12–18 structure was advanced in April 2013. This plan failed when two SPL clubs (Ross County and St Mirren) voted against. The SPL clubs unanimously agreed a revised merger plan a few weeks later, which would retain the same league structure and redistribute more revenues to second tier clubs. The SFL submitted a counter-proposal allowing for more revenues to be given to third and fourth tier clubs, but this was rejected by the SPL, who stuck with the plan agreed by their clubs. An indicative vote of SFL clubs in May suggested that the SPL plan would be formally rejected. Some of the First Division (second tier) clubs threatened to break away from the SFL and form an "SPL2" (SPL second division). The SPL suggested it would welcome the First Division clubs if they decided to leave the SFL. A formal vote of SFL clubs was taken on 12 June. 23 clubs voted in favour, one more than was needed for the proposal to succeed. The merger was formally agreed on 28 June and football was first played under the new structure in the 2013–14 season.

== League and corporate structure ==
On 24 July 2013 the names of the four SPFL divisions were announced – Scottish Premiership, Scottish Championship, Scottish League One and Scottish League Two. The merger was criticised by Alex Anderson of When Saturday Comes as bringing further uncertainty to Scottish football, holding the belief that the semi-professional clubs in the lower divisions will be put into a future regional structure.

The SPFL is operated as a corporation and is owned by the 42 member clubs. Each club is a shareholder, with each having a vote on issues such as rule changes and contracts. The clubs elect a six-man board of directors to oversee the daily operations of the league. The board of directors in turn appoint a Chief Executive. Neil Doncaster became the SPFL's first Chief Executive in July 2013, after beating David Longmuir to the role. The board of directors is composed of eight members, who are elected at the company's annual general meeting.

== Clubs ==
Locations of the SPFL clubs by division:
Premiership; Championship; League One; League Two

Listed below are the 42 member clubs of the SPFL for the 2026–27 season.

Scottish Premiership

- Aberdeen
- Celtic
- Dundee
- Dundee United
- Falkirk
- Heart of Midlothian
- Hibernian
- Kilmarnock
- Motherwell
- Rangers
- St. Johnstone
- St Mirren

Scottish Championship

- Arbroath
- Ayr United
- Dunfermline Athletic
- Greenock Morton
- Inverness Caledonian Thistle
- Livingston
- Partick Thistle
- Queen's Park
- Raith Rovers
- Stenhousemuir

Scottish League One

- Airdrieonians
- Alloa Athletic
- Cove Rangers
- East Fife
- East Kilbride
- Hamilton Academical
- Montrose
- Peterhead
- Queen of the South
- Ross County

Scottish League Two

- Annan Athletic
- Clyde
- Dumbarton
- Edinburgh City
- Elgin City
- Forfar Athletic
- Kelty Hearts
- Stirling Albion
- Stranraer
- The Spartans

== Champions ==
No.	Season	Premiership	Championship	League One	League Two
1	2013–14	Celtic	Dundee	Rangers	Peterhead
2	2014–15	Celtic (2)	Heart of Midlothian	Greenock Morton	Albion Rovers
3	2015–16	Celtic (3)	Rangers	Dunfermline Athletic	East Fife
4	2016–17	Celtic (4)	Hibernian	Livingston	Arbroath
5	2017–18	Celtic (5)	St Mirren	Ayr United	Montrose
6	2018–19	Celtic (6)	Ross County	Arbroath	Peterhead (2)
7	2019–20 (Note: The 2019–20 season was suspended in March 2020 due to the COVID-19 pandemic in Scotland. The season was subsequently curtailed, and points per game averages were used to calculate final tables.)	Celtic (7)	Dundee United	Raith Rovers	Cove Rangers
8	2020–21	Rangers	Heart of Midlothian (2)	Partick Thistle	Queen's Park
9	2021–22	Celtic (8)	Kilmarnock	Cove Rangers	Kelty Hearts
10	2022–23	Celtic (9)	Dundee (2)	Dunfermline Athletic	Stirling Albion
11	2023–24	Celtic (10)	Dundee United (2)	Falkirk	Stenhousemuir
12	2024–25	Celtic (11)	Falkirk	Arbroath (2)	Peterhead (3)
13	2025–26	Celtic (12)	St Johnstone	Inverness Caledonian Thistle	East Kilbride
14	2026–27				

== Promotion/relegation play-off winners ==
The SPFL retained the promotion/relegation play-off format between Scottish Football League divisions introduced in 2005, whilst adding a play-off tournament to the Premiership, then later a play-off between League Two and the Highland Football League and Lowland Football League in the 2014–15 season. Clubs in bold are those who were promoted from the lower to the higher tier.

Season	Premiership / Championship	Championship / League One	League One / League Two	League Two / Regional Leagues
2013–14	**Hamilton Academical**	Cowdenbeath	**Stirling Albion**	—N/a
2014–15	Motherwell	Alloa Athletic	Stenhousemuir	Montrose
2015–16	Kilmarnock	**Ayr United**	**Queen's Park**	**Edinburgh City** ^{L}
2016–17	Hamilton Academical	**Brechin City**	**Forfar Athletic**	Cowdenbeath
2017–18	**Livingston**	**Alloa Athletic**	**Stenhousemuir**	Cowdenbeath
2018–19	St Mirren	Queen of the South	**Clyde**	**Cove Rangers** ^{H}
2019–20 (Note: The 2019–20 season was suspended in March 2020 due to the COVID-19 pandemic in Scotland. The season was subsequently curtailed, and no playoff matches were played.)	—N/a	—N/a	—N/a	—N/a
2020–21	**Dundee**	Greenock Morton	Dumbarton	**Kelty Hearts** ^{L}
2021–22	St Johnstone	**Queen's Park**	**Edinburgh City**	**Bonnyrigg Rose Athletic** ^{L}
2022–23	Ross County	**Airdrieonians**	**Annan Athletic**	**The Spartans** ^{L}
2023–24	Ross County	**Hamilton Academical**	**Dumbarton**	Stranraer
2024–25	**Livingston**	Airdrieonians	**East Fife**	**East Kilbride** ^{L}
2025–26	St Mirren	**Stenhousemuir**	Hamilton Academical	Edinburgh City

^{H} Club promoted from the Highland Football League
^{L} Club promoted from the Lowland Football League

== League sponsorship and media rights ==
One of the reasons given for the merger of the SPL and SFL was the belief that it would help to attract title sponsorship to Scottish league football; contracts between the SPL and Clydesdale Bank and the SFL and Irn-Bru expired in 2013. In October 2013, the SPFL announced a partnership with Irn-Bru, making it the league's official soft drink. Neil Doncaster stated that the SPFL would continue to seek sponsorship for the league and the Scottish League Cup. After two seasons without a main sponsor, a two-year agreement was reached with bookmaker Ladbrokes in May 2015. This was later extended until June 2020. After a year without a title sponsor, the SPFL reached a five-year deal with used car marketplace company Cinch. In October 2023 Cinch exercised its right to walk away from the deal after three years. William Hill took over as sponsors from the 2024–25 season.

The SPFL inherited media rights arrangements with Sky Sports and BT Sport. It emerged in May 2014 that the SPFL had repaid part of the agreed contract due to the additional costs incurred by the broadcasters in covering Rangers matches at lower division grounds. In September 2015, the SPFL announced that it had extended its agreements with Sky and BT to the end of the 2019–20 season on "improved terms". In 2018, it was announced that Sky Sports would take over exclusive live rights for the Premiership from the 2020–21 season.

On 2 November 2013 the SPFL agreed a £20 million deal with sports media rights firm MP & Silva to show games internationally, but this agreement was rescinded in August 2018 when MP & Silva defaulted on its payments.

== Member clubs ==
Club	First season in SPFL	Latest season in SPFL	Last national title
Aberdeen	2013–14	–	–
Airdrieonians	2013–14	–	–
Albion Rovers	2013–14	2022–23	–
Alloa Athletic	2013–14	–	–
Annan Athletic	2013–14	–	–
Arbroath	2013–14	–	–
Ayr United	2013–14	–	–
(England) Berwick Rangers	2013–14	2018–19	–
Bonnyrigg Rose	2022–23	2024–25	
Brechin City	2013–14	2020–21	–
Celtic	2013–14	–	2025–26
Clyde	2013–14	–	–
Cove Rangers	2019–20	–	–
Cowdenbeath	2013–14	2021–22	–
Dumbarton	2013–14	–	–
Dundee	2013–14	–	–
Dundee United	2013–14	–	–
Dunfermline Athletic	2013–14	–	–
East Fife	2013–14	–	–
East Kilbride	2025–26	–	–
East Stirlingshire	2013–14	2015–16	–
Edinburgh City	2016–17	–	–
Elgin City	2013–14	–	–
Falkirk	2013–14	–	–
Forfar Athletic	2013–14	–	–
Greenock Morton	2013–14	–	–
Hamilton Academical	2013–14	–	–
Heart of Midlothian	2013–14	–	–
Hibernian	2013–14	–	–
Inverness Caledonian Thistle	2013–14	–	–
Kelty Hearts	2021–22	–	–
Kilmarnock	2013–14	–	–
Livingston	2013–14	–	–
Montrose	2013–14	–	–
Motherwell	2013–14	–	–
Partick Thistle	2013–14	–	–
Peterhead	2013–14	–	–
Queen of the South	2013–14	–	–
Queen's Park	2013–14	–	–
Raith Rovers	2013–14	–	–
Rangers	2013–14	–	2020–21
Ross County	2013–14	–	–
St Johnstone	2013–14	–	–
St Mirren	2013–14	–	–
Stenhousemuir	2013–14	–	–
Stirling Albion	2013–14	–	–
Stranraer	2013–14	–	–
The Spartans	2023–24	–	–

== Women's football ==
In February 2022, a majority of clubs in the Scottish Women's Premier League (SWPL) voted to accept an offer from the SPFL to run their competitions. The SWPL had previously been operated by Scottish Women's Football.
