= David Longmuir =

Scottish football executive

David Longmuir was the head of the Scottish Football League (SFL) from 2007 until it was dissolved at the end of the 2012/13 season. He currently represents The Professional Golfers' Association of Great Britain and Ireland (PGA) in a sponsorship and commercial development role.

He was one of two candidates for the post of Chief Executive of the newly formed Scottish Professional Football League (SPFL), the result of the SFL's merger with the Scottish Premier League (SPL), but the position was taken by outgoing SPL Chief Executive Neil Doncaster. In May 2014 Longmuir joined Airdrieonians FC on a part-time commercial consultancy basis.

In October 2015 he was appointed by the PGA in a new role.
