= James Ward (football manager) =

Scottish football manager

Personal information
- Date of birth: 25 April 1972 (age 54)
- Place of birth: Scotland

Managerial career
- Years: Team
- 2006–2011: Alloa Athletic (assistant coach)
- 2011–2012: Fulham (scout)
- 2012–2013: Albion Rovers (assistant coach)
- 2013–2014: Albion Rovers

James Ward (born 25 April 1972) is a football manager.

== Career ==
Ward was a coach at Clyde, Hamilton Academical and Alloa Athletic, working for Allan Maitland. He was then assistant manager under Todd Lumsden at Albion Rovers. In May 2013, Ward was promoted to the position of manager at Albion Rovers. He guided the club to the quarter-finals of the 2013–14 Scottish Cup, where they took Rangers to a replay. Ward signed a contract with Albion Rovers in April 2014, but then left the club in June. Albion Rovers had finished seventh in the 2013–14 Scottish League Two.

== Manager statistics ==
As of 3 May 2014

| Team | Nat | From | To | Record | | | | |
| Team | Nat | From | To | G | W | D | L | Win % |
|---|---|---|---|---|---|---|---|---|
| Albion Rovers | (Scotland) | May 2013 | June 2014 | 44 | 16 | 9 | 19 | 36.36 |
