= John McGlynn (Scottish footballer) =

Scottish footballer and manager

Personal information
- Date of birth: 19 December 1961 (age 64)
- Place of birth: Musselburgh, East Lothian, Scotland
- Position: Midfielder

Team information
- Current team: Falkirk (manager)

Youth career
- 1979–1980: Bolton Wanderers

Senior career*
Years	Team	Apps	(Gls)
1980–1983	Berwick Rangers	56	(2)
1983–1984	Musselburgh Athletic		
1984–1987	Whitehill Welfare		
1995–1997	Musselburgh Athletic		

Managerial career
- 2005: Heart of Midlothian (interim)
- 2006–2012: Raith Rovers
- 2012–2013: Heart of Midlothian
- 2013–2014: Livingston
- 2018–2022: Raith Rovers
- 2022–: Falkirk
- * Club domestic league appearances and goals

John McGlynn (born 19 December 1961) is a Scottish football coach and former player who manages Scottish Premiership club Falkirk. He has previously managed Scottish clubs Raith Rovers, Heart of Midlothian and Livingston. McGlynn has won PFA Scotland Manager of the Year a record number of times, with three manager of the year awards spanning two clubs.

== Playing career ==
Musselburgh-born McGlynn enjoyed a brief senior playing career with Berwick Rangers, having been a youth player with Bolton Wanderers. After three years with The Borderers, McGlynn dropped out of the senior game into junior football, firstly with Musselburgh Athletic then Whitehill Welfare.

During his time at Ferguson Park, McGlynn started coaching youth sides and gradually coaching rather than playing became his primary function.

== Coaching and managerial career ==
=== Early career ===
McGlynn was appointed co-manager at Easthouses Lily before returning to Musselburgh as manager in his own right.

=== Hearts (coach) ===
In 1996, McGlynn was invited to assist with coaching the youth sides at Heart of Midlothian by newly appointed manager Jim Jefferies, initially on a part-time basis. Within two years he had earned a permanent position, eventually working his way up to the position of first-team coach. He was the manager when Hearts won the Scottish Youth Cup in 2000 with a 5–3 win over Rangers.

He was twice appointed manager on a caretaker basis in 2005, after the departures of John Robertson and George Burley.

=== Raith Rovers ===
McGlynn ended his ten-year association with Hearts when he was appointed Raith Rovers manager on 20 November 2006. Rovers' second season in the Scottish Second Division ended in disappointment, finishing third and beaten in the promotion play-off semi-finals against Stirling Albion. In 2007–08, McGlynn's first full season, Raith again finished third and fell at the first play-off hurdle, losing to Airdrie United. In 2008–09, however, McGlynn guided Raith to the Second Division title and subsequent promotion back to the First Division.

McGlynn won his first manager of the month award as a Division One manager in March 2010. McGlynn led Raith to a comfortable seventh place and took the club into their first Scottish Cup semi-final for 47 years, beating Peterhead, Airdrie, Aberdeen and Dundee. Raith were eliminated by eventual Cup winners Dundee United.

McGlynn then led Raith to a First Division championship challenge in 2010–11. Despite losing out to Fife derby rivals Dunfermline Athletic in the final weeks of the season, McGlynn won the PFA Scotland Manager of the Year award. In the 2011–12 season, however, Raith struggled against relegation from the First Division.

=== Hearts (manager) ===
McGlynn was appointed manager of Hearts on 26 June 2012. With the restricted budget imposed by the club's financial situation he was only able to bring in two new signings and he put his faith in many young players coming through the youth ranks.

Hearts started the SPL season badly under McGlynn, with only one win in the first six games, and lost in the Europa League play-off against Liverpool 2–1 on aggregate, drawing at Anfield. In the League Cup they defeated Livingston and Dundee United to reach the semi-final, but they lost 1–0 to city rivals Hibernian in the fourth round of the Scottish Cup.

Hearts progressed to the 2013 League Cup Final, but poor league results led to McGlynn departing the cash strapped club by mutual consent on 28 February 2013.

=== Livingston ===
On 12 September 2013, McGlynn was appointed manager of Livingston, replacing the departing Richie Burke. He was initially given a contract until the end of the 2013–14 season. After overseeing good results that improved Livingston's league position, McGlynn agreed an extended rolling contract with the club. McGlynn left Livingston by mutual consent in December 2014.

=== Celtic (scout) ===
Celtic hired McGlynn as a first team scout in January 2015, under the management of Ronny Deila. He continued in this position after the appointment of Brendan Rodgers as Celtic manager in 2016.

=== Raith Rovers (second spell) ===
McGlynn returned to Raith Rovers, now in the Scottish League One, in September 2018. He left the club at the end of the 2021–22 season.

=== Falkirk ===
A day after leaving Raith, McGlynn was appointed manager of Scottish League One club Falkirk. McGlynn led Falkirk to the 2023–24 Scottish League One title, as the club remained undefeated for the whole league campaign and McGlynn won the players' Manager of the Year award. On the back of this success, he then guided the club to the 2024-25 Scottish Championship title, seeing the club return to the top flight for the first time in 15 years. He also picked up a second Manager of the Year award. In his first season in the Scottish Premiership he led Falkirk to a top half finish missing out on a European place by only one position and reached the semi-final of the Scottish Cup losing to rivals Dunfermline 4–2 on penalties after a 0–0 draw.

== Managerial statistics ==
As of match played 21 November 2026

Team	Nat	From	To	Record				
Team	Nat	From	To	G	W	D	L	Win %
Raith Rovers	(Scotland)	20 November 2006	26 June 2012	249	106	64	79	42.57
Heart of Midlothian	(Scotland)	26 June 2012	28 February 2013	34	10	10	14	29.41
Livingston	(Scotland)	12 September 2013	16 December 2014	58	22	9	27	37.93
Raith Rovers	(Scotland)	25 September 2018	3 May 2022	161	75	44	42	46.58
Falkirk	(Scotland)	4 May 2022	Present	204	112	44	48	54.90
Total				706	325	171	210	46.03

- SPFL clubs only (Caretaker spells not included)

== Honours ==
=== As a manager ===
Raith Rovers

- Scottish League One: 2008–09, 2019–20
- Scottish Challenge Cup: 2019–20, 2021–22
- Fife Cup: 2011–12

Hearts

- Scottish League Cup runner up: 2012-13

Falkirk

- Scottish Championship: 2024–25
- Scottish League One: 2023–24

=== As an individual ===
- PFA Scotland Manager of the Year (3): 2010–11, 2023–24, 2024–25 (Record)
- Raith Rovers: Hall of Fame
