= Ray McKinnon (footballer) =

Scottish footballer & manager (born 1970)

Personal information
- Full name: Raymond McKinnon
- Date of birth: 5 August 1970 (age 56)
- Place of birth: Dundee, Scotland
- Position: Midfielder

Team information
- Current team: Brechin City (manager)

Youth career
- 1986–1988: Dundee United

Senior career*
Years	Team	Apps	(Gls)
1988–1992	Dundee United	53	(6)
1992–1994	Nottingham Forest	6	(1)
1994–1995	Aberdeen	26	(0)
1995–1998	Dundee United	43	(6)
1998–1999	Luton Town	30	(2)
1999–2000	Livingston	22	(2)
2000	Raith Rovers	3	(1)
2000	Portadown	1	(0)
2000	Stirling Albion	1	(0)
2000–2001	East Fife	3	(0)
2001	Torquay United	0	(0)
2001–2003	Montrose	32	(2)
2003	Raith Rovers	12	(2)
2004–2005	Lochee United		
2005–2006	Broughty Athletic		

International career
1990–1992	Scotland U21	6	(1)

Managerial career
- 2004–2005: Lochee United (player-manager)
- 2006–2008: Lochee United
- 2012–2015: Brechin City
- 2015–2016: Raith Rovers
- 2016–2017: Dundee United
- 2018: Greenock Morton
- 2018–2019: Falkirk
- 2020–2021: Queen's Park
- 2022–2024: Forfar Athletic
- 2025–: Brechin City
- * Club domestic league appearances and goals

Raymond McKinnon (born 5 August 1970) is a Scottish football player and coach who is currently manager of Highland Football League side Brechin City.

An alumnus of St Saviour's Roman Catholic High School, as a player McKinnon was a midfielder for such clubs as Dundee United, Nottingham Forest, Aberdeen, Livingston, Raith Rovers and Montrose. He also played for the Scotland under-21 team.

McKinnon began his managerial career in junior football with Lochee United before managing senior clubs Brechin City, Raith Rovers, Dundee United, Morton, Falkirk, Queen's Park and Forfar Athletic.

== Playing career ==
McKinnon was born in Dundee on 5 August 1970. He started his career with Dundee United, turning professional on 12 August 1986. He soon gained attention as one of the most promising young midfielders in Scottish football. He impressed Brian Clough enough to win a £750,000 move to Nottingham Forest in July 1992, but almost as quickly as he had arrived found himself out of first team contention, Clough deciding that his skilful passing was not what he wanted for his midfield. He left to join Aberdeen on 8 February 1994, costing the Dons £300,000.

He returned to Dundee United on 3 November 1995, for a fee of £200,000, where he famously scored a hat-trick of free-kicks in a 3–2 win over Kilmarnock at Rugby Park in February 1997. He remained at Tannadice Park until being released at the end of the 1997–98 season during which he had struggled to gain a first team place. In the close-season he attracted interest from Crystal Palace, as well as French sides Auxerre and Bordeaux, but joined Luton Town on 6 August. He left to join Livingston on 12 September 1999, and after an injury hit season and a trial with Wolverhampton Wanderers under Colin Lee, joined Raith Rovers on a short-term contract on 28 July 2000.

Raith were unable to meet his wage demands, so he left and began training with Ayr United. He joined Portadown in October 2000, playing one game. In need of first team football to regain his match fitness he joined Stirling Albion on trial on 27 October, playing in the match against Queen's Park at Hampden Park. He joined East Fife, originally as a triallist on 17 November, leaving on 25 January.

On 15 March 2001 he joined Torquay United on non-contract terms, but left just five days later without appearing in the first team after the re-emergence of a groin injury. He returned to Torquay as a trialist on 30 July 2001, but along with most of the many players Roy McFarland considered during the round of pre-season friendlies was released without earning a contract.

In November 2001 he joined Montrose as a trialist, making his debut in the 1–1 draw with Stirling Albion at Forthbank on 10 November and scoring two weeks later in the 2–1 win over East Fife. Although linked with a return to England to have another attempt at breaking back into full-time football, he signed a deal to stay with Montrose until the end of the season in December 2001. He remained with Montrose until joining Raith Rovers for a second time in January 2003.

== Coaching career ==
=== Junior football and Brechin City ===
McKinnon moved to Lochee United in 2004, before leaving in July 2005 to take up a player/coach position with Broughty Athletic. McKinnon returned as Lochee manager in 2006.

He was linked with the managerial posts at both Brechin City and Montrose in December 2008, with Lochee stating their desire that he stay until at least the end of their run in the Scottish FA Cup.

On 16 July, McKinnon was appointed the new Technical Development Officer of the Scottish Football Association. He replaced Mark McNally, who became assistant manager at Scottish First Division club Morton.

McKinnon was appointed manager of Scottish Second Division club Brechin City on 9 October 2012. They finished in third, eighth and fourth place in the third tier in his three seasons at the club.

=== Raith Rovers ===
On 23 May 2015, it was confirmed that McKinnon had been appointed manager of Raith Rovers. McKinnon guided Raith to fourth place in the 2015–16 Scottish Championship, qualifying for the promotion playoffs. He resigned on 11 May, after entering discussions with Dundee United about their managerial vacancy.

=== Dundee United ===
On 12 May 2016, Dundee United announced that they had appointed McKinnon as their manager on a three-year contract. In his first season in charge, United won the 2017 Scottish Challenge Cup Final, beating St Mirren 2–1. They went on to finish third in the Championship and qualified for the promotion playoffs. They progressed to the final by beating Morton and Falkirk, but lost 1–0 to Hamilton in the final. United sacked McKinnon in October 2017, after losses to Livingston and Inverness left them in fourth place.

=== Morton ===
McKinnon was appointed manager of Scottish Championship club Greenock Morton on 30 May 2018, and he appointed long-term deputy Darren Taylor as his 'first team coach'. The first match of his reign as Morton manager was a 0–0 draw in a friendly away to Forfar Athletic.

On 31 August 2018, after holding a Morton training session in the morning, McKinnon agreed to take over at their Championship rivals Falkirk. Falkirk were later fined by the SPFL for breaching league rules in their recruitment of McKinnon and his assistant Darren Taylor. In the following October, on Falkirk's first visit to Cappielow with McKinnon in charge, Morton fans greeted McKinnon with "Judas" branded red card posters provided by the Greenock Telegraph newspaper.

=== Falkirk ===
McKinnon was appointed Falkirk manager on 31 August 2018. Under his management, Falkirk were relegated to the third tier of the Scottish leagues for the first time since 1980. McKinnon was sacked on 16 November 2019, with the team sitting fourth in League One.

=== Queen's Park ===
McKinnon became manager of Queen's Park in January 2020. He became the first manager of Queen's Park since the 1980s to secure two wins in his first two matches in charge, and the team won 2020–21 Scottish League Two (and promotion to League One) under his management. McKinnon left the club after the 2020–21 season had ended.

=== Forfar Athletic ===
On 10 November 2022, McKinnon was named as the new manager of Scottish League Two club Forfar Athletic on a rolling contract until 2025. In July 2023, he was given permission to speak to EFL League Two club Forest Green Rovers, with a view to becoming assistant manager to his former Dundee United team mate, Duncan Ferguson. The move fell through when Ferguson was sacked as Forest Green manager, and McKinnon resumed his role at Forfar. He left the club in November 2024 following a 3-0 home defeat by The Spartans with the club sitting bottom of League Two.

=== Brechin City (second spell) ===
McKinnon returned to Brechin City, now in the Highland League, in March 2025, when he was appointed as interim manager for the last nine games of the 2024–25 season. Despite winning eight of these matches, Brechin narrowly missed out on the league title to Brora Rangers. McKinnon was then confirmed as Brechin manager on a permanent basis in June 2025.

== Career statistics ==
=== Playing ===
Club performance			League		Cup		League Cup		Continental		Total	
Season	Club	League	Apps	Goals	Apps	Goals	Apps	Goals	Apps	Goals	Apps	Goals
Scotland			League		Scottish Cup		League Cup		Europe		Total	
1988–89	Dundee United	Scottish Premier Division	1	0	-		-		-		1	0
1989–90	Dundee United	Scottish Premier Division	10	0	1	0	-		-		11	0
1990–91	Dundee United	Scottish Premier Division	17	2	4	1	2	0	1	0	24	3
1991–92	Dundee United	Scottish Premier Division	25	4	-		-		-		25	4
England			League		FA Cup		League Cup		Europe		Total	
1992–93	Nottingham Forest	Premier League	6	1	N/A		N/A		N/A		6	1
1993–94	Nottingham Forest	Football League First Division	6	1	N/A		N/A		N/A		6	1
Scotland			League		Scottish Cup		League Cup		Europe		Total	
1993–94	Aberdeen	Scottish Premier Division	26	0	N/A		N/A		N/A		26	0
1994–95	Aberdeen	Scottish Premier Division	26	0	N/A		N/A		N/A		26	0
1995–96	Aberdeen	Scottish Premier Division	26	0							26	0
1995–96	Dundee United	Scottish First Division	24	0	3	0	-		-		27	0
1996–97	Dundee United	Scottish Premier Division	24	6	5	0	2	0	-		31	6
1997–98	Dundee United	Scottish Premier Division	9	0	2	0	1	0	-		12	0
England			League		FA Cup		League Cup		Europe		Total	
1998–99	Luton Town	Football League Second Division	30	2	2	0	5	0	-		37	2
1999–00	Luton Town	Football League Second Division	3	0	-		1	0	-		4	0
Scotland			League		Scottish Cup		League Cup		Europe		Total	
1999–00	Livingston	Scottish First Division	22	2	2	2	1	0	-		25	4
2000–01	Raith Rovers	Scottish First Division	3	1	-		2	0	-		5	1
2000–01	Stirling Albion	Scottish Second Division	1	0	-		-		-		1	0
2000–01	East Fife	Scottish Third Division	3	0	2	0	-		-		5	0
2001–02	Montrose	Scottish Third Division	19	2	-		-		-		19	2
2002–03	Montrose	Scottish Third Division	11	0	1	0	-		-		12	0
2002–03	Raith Rovers	Scottish Second Division	12	2	-		-		-		12	2

=== Managerial ===
As of match played 9 November 2024

Team	From	To	Record				
Team	From	To	G	W	D	L	Win %
Brechin City	9 October 2012	23 May 2015	116	50	26	40	43.10
Raith Rovers	23 May 2015	11 May 2016	43	23	7	13	53.49
Dundee United	12 May 2016	24 October 2017	72	37	19	16	51.39
Greenock Morton	30 May 2018	31 August 2018	8	4	1	3	50.00
Falkirk	31 August 2018	16 November 2019	55	17	18	20	30.91
Queen's Park	2 January 2020	10 May 2021	39	24	6	9	61.54
Forfar Athletic	10 November 2022	9 November 2024	86	27	28	31	31.40
Total			419	182	105	132	43.44

== Honours ==
=== Player ===
Scotland U21

- UEFA under-21 Euros: Bronze 1992
- Toulon Tournament: Bronze 1991

=== Manager ===
Lochee United

- East Region Super League : 2004–05, 2007–08
- Redwood Leisure Cup. : 2007–08
- DJ Laing League Cup : 2007–08

Dundee United

- Scottish Challenge Cup : 2016–17

Queen's Park

- Scottish League Two : 2020–21

== Personal life ==
McKinnon opened a restaurant in Dundee in 2004.
