= Dick Campbell (footballer, born 1953) =

Scottish footballer and manager (born 1953)

Dick Campbell BEM
Personal information
- Full name: Richard Menzies Campbell
- Date of birth: 22 November 1953 (age 72)
- Place of birth: Dunfermline, Scotland

Senior career*
Years	Team	Apps	(Gls)
1970–1971	Dundee United	0	(0)
1971–1974	Cowdenbeath	55	(11)
1974–1975	Dunfermline Athletic	14	(0)
1975–1977	Ross County		
1977–1983	Brechin City	157	(7)
1983	East Stirlingshire	17	(3)
Total		243	(21)

Managerial career
- 1987: Cowdenbeath
- 1999: Dunfermline Athletic
- 2000–2005: Brechin City
- 2005–2007: Partick Thistle
- 2007: Ross County
- 2008–2015: Forfar Athletic
- 2016–2023: Arbroath
- 2024–2026: East Fife
- * Club domestic league appearances and goals

Richard Menzies Campbell BEM (born 22 November 1953) is a Scottish football manager and former player, who most recently managed East Fife.

Campbell's playing career was low-profile and he is more known for his management career which includes successful lengthy spells at Brechin City, Forfar Athletic and Arbroath. Campbell has also managed Cowdenbeath, Dunfermline Athletic, Partick Thistle and Ross County. He has achieved seven promotions at five clubs with the highlights taking Brechin from the fourth tier to the second tier and repeated the feat with Arbroath many years later. He was appointed manager of East Fife in February 2024 and left the role on October 14, 2026, after two and a half years in charge.

== Playing career ==
Campbell's playing career was mainly spent in the lower leagues of Scottish football. Having started out with Dundee United's youth system he then played for Cowdenbeath, Dunfermline Athletic, Ross County (then in the Highland League), Brechin City and East Stirlingshire.

== Coaching career ==
Campbell has accrued more than 1,300 games in the dugout either as an assistant manager or manager in Scottish football. He has won four separate Manager of the year awards and over 40 manager of the month awards in a career spanning decades.

=== Cowdenbeath ===
Campbell's first managerial experience was a short spell at the helm of Cowdenbeath in 1987, after which he returned to coaching at Brechin City.

=== Dunfermline Athletic ===
He moved to Dunfermline Athletic to become Bert Paton's assistant. Paton and Campbell guided Dunfermline to promotion in the 1995–96 Scottish First Division season, and also achieved their highest league position in the new format, (pars had previously finished 3rd in the top league) finishing fifth in the 1996–97 Scottish Premier Division season. Paton and Campbell's team were known for their adventurous attacking style of play. They were also praised for their handling of the club during the time of legendary captain Norrie McCathie's tragic death. When Paton resigned in early 1999, Campbell was given temporary control of the team. After a three-month probationary period, Campbell was made permanent manager at East End Park. However, he left before the end of the year, despite Dunfermline sitting top of the First Division; the club was taken over by new owners who decided Campbell wasn't their man.

=== Brechin City ===
After several months out of the game, Campbell was appointed manager of Brechin City in 2000, with Paton this time acting as his assistant. Over the following five seasons he helped Brechin rise from the Third Division to the First Division, despite their status as a part-time club. The chance to work with full-time players again tempted him to move to Partick Thistle in 2005.

=== Partick Thistle ===
Campbell took over as Thistle manager after the end of Gerry Britton's and Derek Whyte's reign as joint player managers. Initial success was gained, and he won a Manager of the Month award within a month of taking over at the club. Despite this early success, Thistle finished ninth at the end of the 2004–05 season, and were therefore relegated to the Second Division. In the 2005–06 season, he guided the Partick Thistle team to promotion through the play-offs into the First Division, after finishing fourth in the Second Division.

Campbell has been praised in recent times for his negotiation skills, with particular reference to the signing of Simon Donnelly at the start of the 2006–07 season. However, despite a decent start, a string of poor results saw Thistle languishing in the bottom half of the table and his tenure was ended on 27 March 2007.

=== Ross County ===
In the summer of 2007, Campbell was appointed manager of just-relegated Ross County, with the proviso that he would have only one chance at earning the club promotion, and would be sacked if he was unsuccessful. Ultimately, Campbell was not even given a full season in charge, and despite leading the club to the top of Division Two he was sacked on 2 October, allegedly for the team not playing a certain style of football.

=== Forfar Athletic ===
On 8 May 2008, Campbell was appointed manager of Scottish Third Division side Forfar Athletic. On 17 May 2010, he led the club to promotion to the Second Division after defeating local rivals Arbroath in the play-offs, a result which relegated the Red Lichties. Forfar went on to finish in the promotion play off positions in three of the four seasons in League One, missing out on the league championship on the last day to Greenock Morton in the 2014–15 campaign. Following an overhaul of the Forfar squad and a poor run of form midway through the 2015–16 campaign Campbell was sacked on Saturday 12 December 2015, after seven years in charge.

=== Arbroath ===
After leaving Forfar, Campbell made it clear that it was his intention to return to football management at the earliest opportunity. After less than three months out of management, Campbell returned to Angus after being appointed manager of Scottish League Two side Arbroath in March 2016. When appointed manager Arbroath were 8th in League Two and the immediate priority for Campbell was to steer the team clear of the relegation play-off spot. Though the end to the season was largely lacklustre with several disappointing results, Campbell did achieve his immediate remit as Arbroath avoided a bottom place finish and finished 9th.

Before the 2016–17 season, kicked off confidence was starting to grow that Arbroath could mount a serious title challenge. Campbell was keen to construct his own side and was active in the summer transfer window, with signings including Ryan McCord and Colin Hamilton. These acquisitions helped to bolster a squad which many felt had sufficient quality, mainly provided through star-man Bobby Linn, but lacked the confidence required to succeed. However, Campbell was able to guide the "Red Lichties" to the Scottish League Two title in his first full season.

In his second season, Arbroath finished 3rd and were narrowly beaten in the Championship play off semi final against Dumbarton. He then led Arbroath to the Scottish League One title in the 2018–19 season. In the 2019–20 season, a season curtailed by the COVID-19 pandemic, Campbell guided Arbroath to a historic league finish of 5th – the club's highest in many decades. Gayfield Park quickly became a notoriously difficult venue for away teams to visit as The Lichties became effective at using the bitterly cold and gusty wind conditions to their advantage. Campbell helped to provide the biggest upset of the entire Championship season as Arbroath became the only team to defeat eventual champions Dundee United at Tannadice.

Arbroath improved on this performance in the 2021–22 season, as they challenged for promotion to the Premiership. With two games remaining they were within one point of league leaders Kilmarnock, and the one automatic promotion place. They then lost 2–1 at Kilmarnock in the penultimate match, despite having led for most of the game. That result sealed the league title for Kilmarnock and meant Arbroath went into the playoffs, where they lost on penalties to Inverness CT.

Campbell struggled to build on this near-miss, however, as the team finished 8th in the 2022–23 season and narrowly avoided relegation. He left Arbroath on 25 November 2023, following a Scottish Cup defeat by The Spartans.

=== East Fife ===
On February 6, 2024, Campbell was announced as the new manager of East Fife, replacing Greig McDonald who had resigned earlier that week.

== Personal life ==
Campbell was brought up in Hill of Beath. He has a twin brother, Ian, who is also a former football player and manager. They worked together for many years at both Dunfermline, where Ian was a coach, and Brechin City, where Ian was Dick's joint-assistant. When Dick left to manage Partick Thistle, Ian took over the Brechin managerial reins. The brothers were reunited at Forfar, where Ian was assistant manager. The pair worked together once again at Arbroath.

Campbell's son, Iain, is also involved in football, with the left-back leaving Alloa Athletic during the 2009 close season to join his father at Forfar, and so joining his brother Ross, who was already at the club.

Campbell was awarded the British Empire Medal (BEM) in the 2023 Birthday Honours for services to association football and the community in Angus.

== Honours ==
Brechin City

- Scottish Third Division: 2001–02
- Scottish Second Division promotion: 2002–03

Partick Thistle

- Scottish Second Division play–offs: 2005–06

Forfar Athletic

- Scottish Second Division play–offs: 2009–10

Arbroath

- Scottish League Two: 2016–17
- Scottish League One: 2018–19

East Fife

- Scottish League One play-offs 2024-25

=== Individual ===
- Forfar Athletic
  - SPFL League One Manager of the Month: October 2014; March 2015;
- Arbroath
  - Scottish League Two Manager of the Year: 2016–17
  - Scottish League One Manager of the Year: 2018–19
  - Scottish Championship Manager of the Year: 2021–22
  - SPFL Championship Manager of the Month: February 2021

== Managerial statistics ==
As of match played 13 October 2026

Team	From	To	Record				
Team	From	To	G	W	D	L	Win %
Cowdenbeath	1987	1987	12	5	4	3	41.67
Dunfermline Athletic	January 1999	November 1999	31	9	11	11	29.03
Brechin City	2000	January 2005	171	77	32	62	45.03
Partick Thistle	January 2005	March 2007	103	40	26	37	38.83
Ross County	June 2007	November 2007	12	6	3	3	50.00
Forfar Athletic	8 May 2008	12 December 2015	346	141	72	133	40.75
Arbroath	8 March 2016	25 November 2023	322	130	89	103	40.37
East Fife	6 February 2024	14 October 2026	131	51	31	49	38.93
Total			1,128	459	269	400	40.69

== See also ==
- List of football managers with the most matches
