= List of Scottish Professional Football League monthly award winners =

This article lists the winners of the monthly awards in the Scottish Professional Football League.

== 2013–14 season ==
Month	SPFL player	SPFL young player	Premiership manager	Championship manager	League One manager	League Two manager	Ref
August	Richie Foran (Inverness CT)	Stuart Bannigan (Partick Thistle)	Terry Butcher (Inverness CT)	Alex Neil (Hamilton Academical)	Martyn Corrigan (Stenhousemuir)	John Coughlin (East Stirlingshire)	
September	Billy Mckay (Inverness CT)	Andy Robertson (Dundee United)	Derek McInnes (Aberdeen)	Grant Murray (Raith Rovers)	Ally McCoist (Rangers)	Stuart Garden (Montrose)	
October	Stevie May (St Johnstone)	Blair Spittal (Queen's Park)	Tommy Wright (St Johnstone)	Grant Murray (Raith Rovers)	Stephen Aitken (Stranraer)	Jim Duffy (Clyde)	
November	Andy Robertson (Dundee United)	Ryan Gauld (Dundee United)	Jackie McNamara (Dundee United)	Gary Holt (Falkirk)	Stephen Aitken (Stranraer)	Jim McInally (Peterhead)	
December	Kris Commons (Celtic)	John McGinn (St Mirren)	Neil Lennon (Celtic)	John McGlynn (Livingston)	Stephen Aitken (Stranraer)	James Ward (Albion Rovers)	
January	Fraser Forster (Celtic)	Craig Slater (Kilmarnock)	Neil Lennon (Celtic)	Ian Murray (Dumbarton)	Ally McCoist (Rangers)	Colin Cameron (Berwick Rangers)	
February	Adam Rooney (Aberdeen)	Sam Stanton (Hibernian)	Derek McInnes (Aberdeen)	Jimmy Nicholl (Cowdenbeath)	Jim Jefferies (Dunfermline Athletic)	Jim Chapman (Annan Athletic)	
March	Rory McAllister (Peterhead)	Liam Henderson (Celtic)	Neil Lennon (Celtic)	Alex Neil (Hamilton Academical)	Gary Bollan (Airdrieonians)	Jim McInally (Peterhead)	
April	Kenny McLean (St Mirren)	Callum Paterson (Heart of Midlothian)	Gary Locke (Heart of Midlothian)	Gary Holt (Falkirk)	Gary Bollan (Airdrieonians)	Greig McDonald (Stirling Albion)	

== 2014–15 season ==
Month	SPFL player	SPFL young player	Premiership manager	Championship manager	League One manager	League Two manager	Ref
August	Ross Draper (Inverness CT)	Ryan Christie (Inverness CT)	John Hughes (Inverness CT)	Robbie Neilson (Heart of Midlothian)	Mark Roberts (Ayr United)	Allan Moore (Arbroath)	
September	Paul Paton (Dundee United)	Jason Cummings (Hibernian)	Allan Johnston (Kilmarnock)	Alan Stubbs (Hibernian)	Stephen Aitken (Stranraer)	Gary Naysmith (East Fife)	
October	John Guidetti (Celtic)	Lewis Macleod (Rangers)	Alex Neil (Hamilton Academical)	Robbie Neilson (Heart of Midlothian)	Dick Campbell (Forfar Athletic)	Gus MacPherson (Queen's Park)	
November	David Clarkson (Dundee)	Charlie Telfer (Dundee United)	Ronny Deila (Celtic)	Robbie Neilson (Heart of Midlothian)	Jim Duffy (Greenock Morton)	Darren Young (Albion Rovers)	
December	Ryan Jack (Aberdeen)	Stevie Mallan (St Mirren)	Derek McInnes (Aberdeen)	Peter Houston (Falkirk)	Gary Bollan (Airdrieonians)	Allan Moore (Arbroath)	
January	Greg Stewart (Dundee)	Chris Kane (St Johnstone)	John Hughes (Inverness CT)	Peter Houston (Falkirk)	Ray McKinnon (Brechin City)	Jim Weir (Elgin City)	
February	Stefan Johansen (Celtic)	Ryan Christie (Inverness CT)	Jim McIntyre (Ross County)	Alan Stubbs (Hibernian)	Ray McKinnon (Brechin City)	Gary Naysmith (East Fife)	
March	Raffaelle De Vita (Ross County)	Jason Denayer (Celtic)	Jim McIntyre (Ross County)	Robbie Neilson (Heart of Midlothian)	Dick Campbell (Forfar Athletic)	Craig Tully (East Stirlingshire)	
April	Leigh Griffiths (Celtic)	Jason Cummings (Hibernian)	Ronny Deila (Celtic)	James Fowler (Queen of the South)	Ray McKinnon (Brechin City)	Paul Hegarty (Montrose)	

== 2015–16 season ==
Month	Premiership player	Championship player	League One player	League Two player	Premiership manager	Championship manager	League One manager	League Two manager	Ref
August	Leigh Griffiths (Celtic)	James Tavernier (Rangers)	Faissal El Bakhtaoui (Dunfermline Athletic)	Smart Osadolor (Annan Athletic)	Derek McInnes (Aberdeen)	Mark Warburton (Rangers)	Dick Campbell (Forfar Athletic)	Gary Naysmith (East Fife)	
September	Niall McGinn (Aberdeen)	Martyn Waghorn (Rangers)	Nicky Devlin (Ayr United)	Bobby Linn (Arbroath)	Derek McInnes (Aberdeen)	Mark Warburton (Rangers)	Ian McCall (Ayr United)	Gus MacPherson (Queen's Park)	
October	Leigh Griffiths (Celtic)	Jason Cummings (Hibernian)	Sean Murdoch (Dunfermline Athletic)	Matty Flynn (Annan Athletic)	Ronny Deila (Celtic)	Alan Stubbs (Hibernian)	Darren Young (Albion Rovers)	Paul Hegarty (Montrose)	
November	Michael O'Halloran (St Johnstone)	John McGinn (Hibernian)	Leighton McIntosh (Peterhead)	David Gormley (Clyde)	Alan Archibald (Partick Thistle)	Alan Stubbs (Hibernian)	Brown Ferguson (Stenhousemuir)	Barry Ferguson (Clyde)	
December	Liam Boyce (Ross County)	Danny Rogers (Falkirk)	Greig Spence (Cowdenbeath)	Darren Smith (Stirling Albion)	Mark McGhee (Motherwell)	Peter Houston (Falkirk)	Allan Johnston (Dunfermline Athletic)	Stuart McLaren (Stirling Albion)	
January	Kane Hemmings (Dundee)	Kenny Miller (Rangers)	Shane Sutherland (Peterhead)	Nathan Austin (East Fife)	Ronny Deila (Celtic)	Mark Warburton (Rangers)	Jim McInally (Peterhead)	Jim Weir (Elgin City)	
February	Paul Paton (Dundee United)	Declan McManus (Greenock Morton)	Rory McAllister (Peterhead)	Steven Doris (Stirling Albion)	Mixu Paatelainen (Dundee United)	Peter Houston (Falkirk)	Jim McInally (Peterhead)	Barry Ferguson (Clyde)	
March	Jackson Irvine (Ross County)	Christian Nadé (Dumbarton)	Faissal El Bakhtaoui (Dunfermline Athletic)	Kyle Wilkie (East Fife)	Mark McGhee (Motherwell)	Ray McKinnon (Raith Rovers)	Allan Johnston (Dunfermline Athletic)	Gary Naysmith (East Fife)	
April	Patrick Roberts (Celtic)	Will Vaulks (Falkirk)	Robert Thomson (Brechin City)	Brian Cameron (Elgin City)	John Hughes (Inverness CT)	Ray McKinnon (Raith Rovers)	Darren Dods (Brechin City)	John Coughlin (Berwick Rangers)	

== 2016–17 season ==
Month	Premiership player	Championship player	League One player	League Two player	Premiership manager	Championship manager	League One manager	League Two manager	Ref
August	Liam Boyce (Ross County)	Jason Cummings (Hibernian)	Jordan Kirkpatrick (Alloa Athletic)	Josh Peters (Forfar Athletic)	Brendan Rodgers (Celtic)	Neil Lennon (Hibernian)	Jack Ross (Alloa Athletic)	Gary Bollan (Forfar Athletic)	
September	Moussa Dembélé (Celtic)	Cammy Bell (Dundee United)	Jamie Insall (East Fife)	Thomas O'Brien (Forfar Athletic)	Richie Foran (Inverness CT)	Peter Houston (Falkirk)	Gary Naysmith (East Fife)	Gary Bollan (Forfar Athletic)	
October	Adam Barton (Partick Thistle)	Thomas O'Ware (Greenock Morton)	Liam Buchanan (Livingston)	Shane Sutherland (Elgin City)	Brendan Rodgers (Celtic)	Jim Duffy (Greenock Morton)	David Hopkin (Livingston)	Jim Weir (Elgin City)	
November	Bjørn Johnsen (Heart of Midlothian)	John McGinn (Hibernian)	Rohan Ferguson (Airdrieonians)	Marc Laird (Edinburgh City)	Robbie Neilson (Heart of Midlothian)	Ray McKinnon (Dundee United)	Mark Wilson (Airdrieonians)	Gary Jardine (Edinburgh City)	
December	Stuart Armstrong (Celtic)	Mark Docherty (Dumbarton)	Jonathan Page (East Fife)	Andrew Stobie (Edinburgh City)	Brendan Rodgers (Celtic)	Stephen Aitken (Dumbarton)	Barry Smith (East Fife)	Gary Jardine (Edinburgh City)	
January	No award, due to winter break	Ross Forbes (Greenock Morton)	Michael Dunlop (Albion Rovers)	Shane Sutherland (Elgin City)	No award, due to winter break	Neil Lennon (Hibernian)	Jim McInally (Peterhead)	Gary Bollan (Forfar Athletic)	
February	Moussa Dembélé (Celtic)	Jason Cummings (Hibernian)	Willie Gibson (Stranraer)	Gavin Skelton (Annan Athletic)	Paul Hartley (Dundee)	Peter Houston (Falkirk)	Jim Goodwin (Alloa Athletic)	Jim Chapman (Annan Athletic)	
March	Stuart Armstrong (Celtic)	Efe Ambrose (Hibernian)	Andy Jackson (Brechin City)	Greg Rutherford (Berwick Rangers)	Derek McInnes (Aberdeen)	Jack Ross (St Mirren)	David Hopkin (Livingston)	Dave Mackay (Stirling Albion)	
April	Liam Boyce (Ross County)	Stevie Mallan (St Mirren)	Liam Buchanan (Livingston)	Ryan McCord (Arbroath)	Brendan Rodgers (Celtic)	Jack Ross (St Mirren)	David Hopkin (Livingston)	Dick Campbell (Arbroath)	

== 2017–18 season ==
Month	Premiership player	Championship player	League One player	League Two player	Premiership manager	Championship manager	League One manager	League Two manager	Ref
August	Michael O'Halloran (St Johnstone)	Joe Cardle (Dunfermline Athletic)	Lewis Vaughan (Raith Rovers)	Darren Smith (Stirling Albion)	Tommy Wright (St Johnstone)	Allan Johnston (Dunfermline Athletic)	Barry Smith (Raith Rovers)	Dave Mackay (Stirling Albion)	
September	Louis Moult (Motherwell)	Lewis Morgan (St Mirren)	Ryan McCord (Arbroath)	Mark McGuigan (Stenhousemuir)	Brendan Rodgers (Celtic)	David Hopkin (Livingston)	Brian Kerr (Albion Rovers)	Brown Ferguson (Stenhousemuir)	
October	Kieran Tierney (Celtic)	Carl Tremarco (Inverness CT)	Michael Moffat (Ayr United)	Craig Johnston (Montrose)	Neil Lennon (Hibernian)	John Robertson (Inverness CT)	Ian McCall (Ayr United)	Gavin Price (Elgin City)	
November	David Templeton (Hamilton Academical)	Scott Fraser (Dundee United)	Lawrence Shankland (Ayr United)	Cammy Ballantyne (Montrose)	Martin Canning (Hamilton Academical)	Stephen Aitken (Dumbarton)	Ian McCall (Ayr United)	Stewart Petrie (Montrose)	
December	Kris Boyd (Kilmarnock)	Stephen Dobbie (Queen of the South)	Alan Trouten (Albion Rovers)	Rory McAllister (Peterhead)	Steve Clarke (Kilmarnock)	Jack Ross (St Mirren)	Barry Smith (Raith Rovers)	Jim McInally (Peterhead)	
January	No award, due to winter break	Stephen McGinn (St Mirren)	Angus Beith (Stranraer)	Darren Smith (Stirling Albion)	No award, due to winter break	Jack Ross (St Mirren)	Dick Campbell (Arbroath)	Jim McInally (Peterhead)	
February	Josh Windass (Rangers)	Ryan Hardie (Livingston)	Willis Furtado (Raith Rovers)	Peter MacDonald (Stirling Albion)	Steve Clarke (Kilmarnock)	David Hopkin (Livingston)	Dick Campbell (Arbroath)	Dave Mackay (Stirling Albion)	
March	Stephen O'Donnell (Kilmarnock)	Nicky Clark (Dunfermline Athletic)	Lawrence Shankland (Ayr United)	Chris McStay (Clyde)	Steve Clarke (Kilmarnock)	Jack Ross (St Mirren)	Ian McCall (Ayr United)	Danny Lennon (Clyde)	

== 2018–19 season ==
Month	Premiership player	Championship player	League One player	League Two player	Premiership manager	Championship manager	League One manager	League Two manager	Ref
August	Tony Watt (St Johnstone)	Lawrence Shankland (Ayr United)	Ryan Wallace (Arbroath)	Rory McAllister (Peterhead)	Craig Levein (Heart of Midlothian)	Ian McCall (Ayr United)	Dick Campbell (Arbroath)	Peter Murphy (Annan Athletic)	
September	Steven Naismith (Heart of Midlothian)	Stephen Dobbie (Queen of the South)	Bobby Linn (Arbroath)	Conrad Balatoni (Edinburgh City)	Gary Holt (Livingston)	Steve Ferguson & Stuart Kettlewell (Ross County)	Darren Young (East Fife)	James McDonaugh (Edinburgh City)	
October	James Forrest (Celtic)	Billy Mckay (Ross County)	Kevin Nisbet (Raith Rovers)	Blair Henderson (Edinburgh City)	Brendan Rodgers (Celtic)	Steve Ferguson & Stuart Kettlewell (Ross County)	Dick Campbell (Arbroath)	Mark Roberts (Queen's Park)	
November	Ryan Christie (Celtic)	Fraser Aird (Dundee United)	Ricky Little (Arbroath)	Dylan Cogill (Clyde)	Tommy Wright (St Johnstone)	Robbie Neilson (Dundee United)	Dick Campbell (Arbroath)	Danny Lennon (Clyde)	
December	Sam Cosgrove (Aberdeen)	Dario Zanatta (Alloa Athletic)	Martin Rennie (Montrose)	Blair Henderson (Edinburgh City)	Derek McInnes (Aberdeen)	Jim Goodwin (Alloa Athletic)	Stewart Petrie (Montrose)	Jim McInally (Peterhead)	
January	No award, due to winter break	Stephen Dobbie (Queen of the South)	Anton Dowds (East Fife)	Peter MacDonald (Stirling Albion)	No award, due to winter break	Gary Naysmith (Queen of the South)	Jim Weir (Forfar Athletic)	Danny Lennon (Clyde)	
February	Jake Hastie (Motherwell)	Billy Mckay (Ross County)	Dom Thomas (Dumbarton)	Chris Johnston (Annan Athletic)	Stephen Robinson (Motherwell)	Stevie Crawford (Dunfermline Athletic)	Jim Duffy (Dumbarton)	Peter Murphy (Annan Athletic)	
March	Odsonne Edouard (Celtic)	Aaron Doran (Inverness CT)	Dale Hilson (Forfar Athletic)	Peter Morrison (Albion Rovers)	Paul Heckingbottom (Hibernian)	John Robertson (Inverness CT)	Jim Weir (Forfar Athletic)	Kevin Harper (Albion Rovers)	
April	Scott Arfield (Rangers)	Brian Graham (Ross County)	Calum Gallagher (Dumbarton)	Smart Osadolor (Albion Rovers)	Steven Gerrard (Rangers)	Steve Ferguson & Stuart Kettlewell (Ross County)	Jim Duffy (Dumbarton)	Danny Lennon (Clyde)	

== 2019–20 season ==
Month	Premiership player	Championship player	League One player	League Two player	Premiership manager	Championship manager	League One manager	League Two manager	Ref
August	Odsonne Édouard (Celtic)	Lawrence Shankland (Dundee United)	Marc McCallum (Forfar Athletic)	Declan Glass (Cove Rangers)	Neil Lennon (Celtic)	Robbie Neilson (Dundee United)	Darren Young (East Fife)	Paul Hartley (Cove Rangers)	
September	Alfredo Morelos (Rangers)	Alan Forrest (Ayr United)	Steven Anderson (Raith Rovers)	Craig Barr (Cowdenbeath)	Steven Gerrard (Rangers)	Ian McCall (Ayr United and Partick Thistle)	John McGlynn (Raith Rovers)	Gary Bollan (Cowdenbeath)	
October	Mohamed Elyounoussi (Celtic)	Declan McDaid (Dundee)	Graham Webster (Montrose)	Shane Sutherland (Elgin City)	Angelo Alessio (Kilmarnock)	James McPake (Dundee)	Stewart Petrie (Montrose)	Gavin Price (Elgin City)	
November	Christian Doidge (Hibernian)	Kevin Nisbet (Dunfermline Athletic)	Dale Carrick (Airdrieonians)	Salim Kouider-Aïssa (Queen's Park)	Neil Lennon (Celtic)	Robbie Neilson (Dundee United)	Ian Murray (Airdrieonians)	Mark Roberts (Queen's Park)	
December	Martin Boyle (Hibernian)	Calum Butcher (Dundee United)	Andrew Steeves (Montrose)	Liam Henderson (Edinburgh City)	Steven Gerrard (Rangers)	Robbie Neilson (Dundee United)	Stewart Petrie (Montrose)	James McDonaugh (Edinburgh City)	
January	Odsonne Édouard (Celtic)	Kevin O'Hara (Alloa Athletic)	Declan McManus (Falkirk)	Mitch Megginson (Cove Rangers)	Gary Holt (Livingston)	Peter Grant (Alloa Athletic)	David McCracken & Lee Miller (Falkirk)	Paul Hartley (Cove Rangers)	
February	Billy Mckay (Ross County)	Nicky Cadden (Greenock Morton)	Scott Agnew (East Fife)	Dylan Bikey (Stirling Albion)	Neil Lennon (Celtic)	David Hopkin (Greenock Morton)	Darren Young (East Fife)	Ray McKinnon (Queen's Park)	

== 2020–21 season ==
Month	Premiership player	Championship player	League One player	League Two player	Premiership manager	Championship manager	League One manager	League Two manager	Ref
August	Ryan Kent (Rangers)	—N/a	—N/a	—N/a	Steven Gerrard (Rangers)	—N/a	—N/a	—N/a	
September	James Tavernier (Rangers)	—N/a	—N/a	—N/a	Neil Lennon (Celtic)	—N/a	—N/a	—N/a	
October	Connor Goldson (Rangers)	Euan Murray (Dunfermline Athletic)	Stuart McKenzie (Cove Rangers)	Willie Muir (Queen's Park)	Steven Gerrard (Rangers)	Stevie Crawford (Dunfermline Athletic)	Paul Hartley (Cove Rangers)	Ray McKinnon (Queen's Park)	
November	James Tavernier (Rangers)	Kyle Turner (Dunfermline Athletic)	Thomas Robert (Airdrieonians)	Darryl Duffy (Stranraer)	Steven Gerrard (Rangers)	Stevie Crawford (Dunfermline Athletic)	Lee Miller & David McCracken (Falkirk)	Stephen Farrell (Stranraer)	
December	David Turnbull (Celtic)	Charlie Adam (Dundee)	Jack Hamilton (East Fife)	Andy Ryan (Stirling Albion)	David Martindale (Livingston)	Robbie Neilson (Heart of Midlothian)	Stewart Petrie (Montrose)	Kevin Rutkiewicz (Stirling Albion)	
January	Scott Robinson (Livingston)	Connor Shields (Queen of the South)	—N/a	—N/a	David Martindale (Livingston)	Allan Johnston (Queen of the South)	—N/a	—N/a	
February	Odsonne Édouard (Celtic)	Willie Gibson (Queen of the South)	—N/a	—N/a	Steven Gerrard (Rangers)	Dick Campbell (Arbroath)	—N/a	—N/a	
March	Alfredo Morelos (Rangers)	David Carson (Inverness Caledonian Thistle)	Graham Webster (Montrose)	Raffaele De Vita (Edinburgh City)	Callum Davidson (St Johnstone)	James McPake (Dundee)	Lee Miller & David McCracken (Falkirk)	Gary Naysmith (Edinburgh City)	
April	Kyle Lafferty (Kilmarnock)	Jack Hamilton (Arbroath)	Scott Tiffoney (Partick Thistle)	Matthew Aitken (Albion Rovers)	Graham Alexander (Motherwell)	Robbie Neilson (Heart of Midlothian)	Ian McCall (Partick Thistle)	Brian Reid (Albion Rovers)	

== 2021–22 season ==
Month	Premiership player	Championship player	League One player	League Two player	Premiership manager	Championship manager	League One manager	League Two manager	Ref
August	Martin Boyle (Hibernian)	Michael McKenna (Arbroath)	Simon Murray (Queens Park)	Joe Cardle (Kelty Hearts)	Robbie Neilson (Heart of Midlothian)	Billy Dodds (Inverness Caledonian Thistle)	Laurie Ellis (Queen's Park)	Kevin Thomson (Kelty Hearts)	
September	Ian Harkes (Dundee United)	Joel Nouble (Arbroath)	Callum Wilson (Dumbarton)	Nathan Austin (Kelty Hearts)	Graham Alexander (Motherwell)	Dick Campbell (Arbroath)	Stephen Farrell (Dumbarton)	Kevin Rutkiewicz (Stirling Albion)	
October	Jota (Celtic)	Oli Shaw (Kilmarnock)	Rory McAllister (Cove Rangers)	Craig Thomson (Forfar Athletic)	Ange Postecoglou (Celtic)	John McGlynn (Scottish footballer) (Raith Rovers)	Stewart Petrie (Montrose)	Gary Irvine (Forfar Athletic)	
November	Jota (Celtic)	Ethan Ross (Raith Rovers)	Mitchel Megginson (Cove Rangers)	John Robertson (Edinburg City)	Graham Alexander (Motherwell)	Ian McCall (Partick Thistle)	Paul Hartley (Cove Rangers)	Kevin Thomson (Kelty Hearts)	
December	Alfredo Morelos (Rangers)	Anton Dowds (Arbroath)	Blair Yule (Cove Rangers)	Dominic Docherty (Annan Athletic)	Giovanni Van Bronckhorst (Rangers)	Dick Campbell (Arbroath)	Paul Hartley (Cove Rangers)	Peter Murphy (Annan Athletic)	
January	Regan Charles-Cook (Ross County)	Gavin Reilly (Greenock Morton)	Dylan Easton (Airdrieonians)	Tam Orr (Stenhousemuir)	Ange Postecoglou (Celtic)	Dougie Imrie (Greenock Morton)	Ian Murray (Airdrieonians)	Gavin Price (Elgin City)	
February	Bruce Anderson (Livingston)	Kyle Lafferty (Kilmarnock)	Rhys McCabe (Airdrieonians)	Nicky Jamieson (Stenhousemuir)	Ange Postecoglou (Celtic)	Dougie Imrie (Greenock Morton)	Ian Murray (Airdrieonians)	Stephen Swift (Stenhousemuir)	
March	Giorgos Giakoumakis (Celtic)	Kyle Lafferty (Kilmarnock)	Callum Smith (Airdrieonians)	Tommy Goss (Annan Athletic)	Ange Postecoglou (Celtic)	Derek McInnes (Kilmarnock)	Paul Hartley (Cove Rangers)	Kevin Thomson (Kelty Hearts)	

== 2022–23 season ==
Month	Premiership player	Championship player	League One player	League Two player	Premiership manager	Championship manager	League One manager	League Two manager	Ref
August	Kyogo Furuhashi (Celtic)	Dipo Akinyemi (Ayr United)	Calum Gallagher (Airdrieonians)	Declan Byrne (Dumbarton)	Ange Postecoglou (Celtic)	Lee Bullen (Ayr United)	Rhys McCabe (Airdrieonians)	Stevie Farrell (Dumbarton)	
September / October	Antonio Čolak (Rangers)	Robbie Muirhead (Greenock Morton)	Danny Handling (Edinburgh)	Kane Hester (Elgin City)	Ange Postecoglou (Celtic)	Dougie Imrie (Greenock Morton)	James McPake (Dunfermline Athletic)	Darren Young (Stirling Albion)	
November	Sead Hakšabanović (Celtic)	Paul McMullan (Dundee)	Jordan Allan (Clyde)	Charlie Reilly (Albion Rovers)	David Martindale (Livingston)	Gary Bowyer (Dundee)	James McPake (Dunfermline Athletic)	Stevie Farrell (Dumbarton)	
December	Kyogo Furuhashi (Celtic)	Grant Savoury (Queen's Park)	John Robertson (Edinburgh)	Chris Johnston (Annan Athletic)	Michael Beale (Rangers)	Owen Coyle (Queen's Park)	Alan Maybury (Edinburgh)	Stevie Farrell (Dumbarton)	
January	Kevin Nisbet (Hibernian)	Billy Mckay (Inverness CT)	Callumn Morrison (Falkirk)	Charlie Reilly (Albion Rovers)	Robbie Neilson (Heart of Midlothian)	Billy Dodds (Inverness CT)	John McGlynn (Falkirk)	Ray McKinnon (Forfar Athletic)	
February	Reo Hatate (Celtic)	Connor Shields (Queen's Park)	Kyle Benedictus (Dunfermline Athletic)	Matty Yates (Stenhousemuir)	Stuart Kettlewell (Motherwell)	Dougie Imrie (Greenock Morton)	John McGlynn (Falkirk)	Gary Naysmith (Stenhousemuir)	
March	Duk (Aberdeen)	Dipo Akinyemi (Ayr United)	Gabby McGill (Airdrieonians)	Tommy Goss (Annan Athletic)	Barry Robson (Aberdeen)	Gary Bowyer (Dundee)	Marvin Bartley; Queen of the South	Greig McDonald (East Fife)	
April	Kevin van Veen (Motherwell)	Kyle Turner (Partick Thistle)	Craig Wighton (Dunfermline Athletic)	Dale Carrick (Stirling Albion)	Barry Robson (Aberdeen)	Billy Dodds (Inverness CT)	James McPake (Dunfermline Athletic)	Darren Young (Stirling Albion)	

== 2023–24 season ==
Month	Premiership player	Championship player	League One player	League Two player	Premiership manager	Championship manager	League One manager	League Two manager	Ref
August	Ryan Strain (St Mirren)	Ruari Paton (Queen's Park)	Jamie Smith (Hamilton Academical)	Jamie Dishington (The Spartans)	Stephen Robinson (St Mirren)	Robin Veldman (Queen's Park)	John Rankin (Hamilton Academical)	Douglas Samuel (The Spartans)	
September	Matt O'Riley (Celtic)	Jermaine Hylton (Arbroath)	Callumn Morrison (Falkirk)	Gregor Buchanan (Stenhousemuir)	Brendan Rodgers (Celtic)	Jim Goodwin (Dundee United)	John McGlynn (Falkirk)	Gary Naysmith (Stenhousemuir)	
October	Abdallah Sima (Rangers)	Kai Fotheringham (Dundee United)	Kyle Macdonald (Hamilton Accies)	Bradley Whyte (Spartans)	Derek McInnes (Kilmarnock)	Jim Goodwin (Dundee United)	John McGlynn (Falkirk)	Douglas Samuel (Spartans)	
November	Lawrence Shankland (Heart of Midlothian)	David Wotherspoon (Inverness CT)	Rumarn Burrell (Cove Rangers)	Matthew Aitken (Stenhousemuir)	Steven Naismith (Heart of Midlothian)	Duncan Ferguson (Inverness CT)	Paul Hartley (Cove Rangers)	Gary Naysmith (Stenhousemuir)	
December	Lawrence Shankland (Heart of Midlothian)	Lewis Vaughan (Raith Rovers)	Rumarn Burrell (Cove Rangers)	Matthew Aitken (Stenhousemuir)	Derek McInnes (Kilmarnock)	Ian Murray (Raith Rovers)	John McGlynn (Falkirk)	Gary Naysmith (Stenhousemuir)	
January	Alan Forrest (Heart of Midlothian)	George Oakley (Greenock Morton)	Calvin Miller (Falkirk)	Blair Henderson (The Spartans)	Philippe Clement (Rangers)	Dougie Imrie (Greenock Morton)	John McGlynn (Falkirk)	Gary Naysmith (Stenhousemuir)	
February	Blair Spittal (Motherwell)	Dom Thomas (Queens Park)	Taylor Steven (Alloa Athletic)	Martin Rennie (Clyde)	Philippe Clement (Rangers)	Dougie Imrie (Greenock Morton)	Andy Graham (Alloa Athletic)	Ray McKinnon (Forfar)	
March	Myziane Maolida (Hibernian)	Louis Moult (Dundee United)	Callumn Morrison (Falkirk)	Alan Trouten (East Fife)	Tony Docherty (Dundee)	James McPake (Dunfermline Athletic)	John McGlynn (Falkirk)	Dick Campbell (East Fife)	
April	Luke McCowan (Dundee)	Brian Graham (Partick Thistle)	Aiden Smith (Annan)	Bradley Barrett (Bonnyrigg Rose)	Brendan Rodgers (Celtic)	Jim Goodwin (Dundee Utd)	John McGlynn (Falkirk)	Stevie Farrell (Dumbarton)	

== 2024–25 season ==
Month	Premiership player	Championship player	League One player	League Two player	Premiership manager	Championship manager	League One manager	League Two manager	Ref
August	Callum McGregor (Celtic)	Anton Dowds (Falkirk)	Ross Cunningham (Kelty Hearts)	Nathan Austin (East Fife)	Jimmy Thelin (Aberdeen)	John McGlynn (Falkirk)	Michael Tidser (Kelty Hearts)	Jordon Brown and Ryan Strachan (Peterhead)	
September	Lennon Miller (Motherwell)	Cammy Kerr (Queen's Park)	Reece Lyon (Queen of the South)	Alan Trouten (East Fife)	Brendan Rodgers (Celtic)	Callum Davidson (Queen's Park)	Stewart Petrie (Montrose)	Dick Campbell (East Fife)	
October	Nicky Devlin (Aberdeen)	Ethan Ross (Falkirk)	Mitch Megginson (Cove Rangers)	Jack Murray (Elgin City)	Jimmy Thelin (Aberdeen)	John McGlynn (Falkirk)	Paul Hartley (Cove Rangers)	Allan Hale (Elgin City)	
November	Sam Dalby (Dundee United)	Scott Robinson (Partick Thistle)	Scott Williamson (Kelty Hearts)	Connor Young (Edinburgh City)	Brendan Rodgers (Celtic)	David Martindale (Livingston)	Scott Kellacher (Inverness CT)	Michael McIndoe (Edinburgh City)	
December	Nicky Cadden (Hibernian)	Cameron Blues (Greenock Morton)	Gavin Reilly (Arbroath)	Liam Scullion (Clyde)	David Gray (Hibernian)	Dougie Imrie (Greenock Morton)	David Gold and Colin Hamilton (Arbroath)	Michael McIndoe (Edinburgh City)	
January	Hamza Igamane (Rangers)	George Oakley (Ayr United)	Adam Brooks (Queen of the South)	Alan Trouten (East Fife)	Neil Critchley (Heart of Midlothian)	Scott Brown (Ayr United)	Peter Murphy (Queen of the South)	Dick Campbell (East Fife)	
February	Daizen Maeda (Celtic)	Scott Arfield (Falkirk)	Owen Stirton (Montrose)	Ouzy See (Edinburgh City)	David Gray (Hibernian)	David Martindale (Livingston)	Gary Naysmith (Stenhousemuir)	Michael McIndoe (Edinburgh City)	
March	Daizen Maeda (Celtic)	Calvin Miller (Falkirk)	Blair Lyons (Montrose)	Martin Rennie (Clyde)	David Gray (Hibernian)	Brian Graham and Mark Wilson (Partick Thistle)	David Gold and Colin Hamilton (Arbroath)	Jordon Brown and Ryan Strachan (Peterhead)	
April	Simon Murray (Dundee)	Robbie Muirhead (Livingston)	Jordan Allan (Queen of the South)	Cammy Smith (Peterhead)	Jimmy Thelin (Aberdeen)	David Martindale (Livingston)	Peter Murphy (Queen of the South)	Jordon Brown and Ryan Strachan (Peterhead)	

== 2025–26 season ==
Month	Premiership player	Championship player	League One player	League Two player	Premiership manager	Championship manager	League One manager	League Two manager	Ref
August	Ivan Dolček (Dundee United)	Josh McPake (St Johnstone)	Ross Munro (Inverness CT)	Robbie Mahon (Edinburgh City)	Derek McInnes (Heart of Midlothian)	Simo Valakari (St Johnstone)	Scott Kellacher (Inverness CT)	Mick Kennedy (East Kilbride)	
September	Lawrence Shankland (Heart of Midlothian)	Josh McPake (St Johnstone)	Oli Shaw (Hamilton Academical)	Marley Redfern (Clyde)	Derek McInnes (Heart of Midlothian)	Simo Valakari (St Johnstone)	Scott Kellacher (Inverness CT)	Darren Young (Clyde)	
October	Cláudio Braga (Heart of Midlothian)	Findlay Marshall (Arbroath)	Kieran Millar (East Fife)	Keith Watson (Annan Athletic)	Derek McInnes (Heart of Midlothian)	Mark Wilson (Partick Thistle)	Gary Naysmith (Stenhousemuir)	Willie Gibson (Annan Athletic)	
November	Tawanda Maswanhise (Motherwell)				Martin O'Neill (Celtic)	Mark Wilson (Partick Thistle)	Scott Kellacher (Inverness CT)	Allan Hale (Elgin City)	
December	Elliot Watt (Motherwell)				Jens Berthel Askou (Motherwell)				
January	Tawanda Maswanhise (Motherwell)				Danny Röhl (Rangers)				
February	Youssef Chermiti (Rangers)				Jens Berthel Askou (Motherwell)				
March	Barney Stewart (Falkirk)				Jim Goodwin (Dundee United)				
April	Will Ferry (Dundee United)				Martin O'Neill (Celtic)				

== See also ==
- Scottish Football League monthly awards
- Scottish Premier League monthly awards
- Scottish Professional Football League yearly awards
