= 2020–21 Scottish League Two =

Scottish League Two
- Season: 2020–21
- Dates: 17 October 2020 – 4 May 2021
- Champions: Queen's Park
- Promoted: Queen's Park
- Relegated: Brechin City
- Matches: 110
- Goals: 293 (2.66 per match)
- Top goalscorer: Kane Hester (15 goals)

The 2020–21 Scottish League Two was the 27th season in the current format of 10 teams in the fourth-tier of Scottish football. The season commenced later than usual on 17 October, being played over a shortened 27-game period due to the Coronavirus pandemic.

The bottom team entered a two-legged play-off against the winners of the Pyramid play-off between the Highland League and Lowland League champions, determine which team competes in League Two in the 2021–22 season.

Ten teams contested the league: Albion Rovers, Annan Athletic, Brechin City, Cowdenbeath, Edinburgh City, Elgin City, Queen's Park, Stenhousemuir, Stirling Albion and Stranraer.

On 11 January 2021, the league was suspended for three weeks due to the COVID-19 pandemic. On 29 January 2021, the suspension was extended until at least 14 February. In March 2021, the Scottish Government gave permission for the league to resume. On 4 March, League One and Two clubs proposed shortening the season to 22 matches, with each team playing all other teams twice, followed by a split in the table to determine the final four matches. The clubs suggested a restart date of 20 March, which was approved by the SPFL.

== Teams ==
The following teams changed division after the 2019–20 season.

=== To League Two ===
Relegated from League One

- Stranraer

=== From League Two ===
Promoted to League One

- Cove Rangers

=== Stadia and locations ===
Albion Rovers	Annan Athletic	Brechin City	Cowdenbeath
Cliftonhill	Galabank	Glebe Park	Central Park
Capacity: 1,238	Capacity: 2,504	Capacity: 4,123	Capacity: 4,309
Edinburgh City	Location of teams in 2020–21 Scottish League Two		Elgin City
Ainslie Park	Location of teams in 2020–21 Scottish League Two		Borough Briggs
Capacity: 3,534	Location of teams in 2020–21 Scottish League Two		Capacity: 4,520
Queen's Park	Stenhousemuir	Stirling Albion	Stranraer
Hampden Park	Ochilview Park	Forthbank Stadium	Stair Park
Capacity: 51,866	Capacity: 3,746	Capacity: 3,808	Capacity: 4,178

=== Personnel and kits ===
Team	Manager	Captain	Kit manufacturer	Shirt sponsor
Albion Rovers	(Scotland) Brian Reid	(Scotland) Aron Lynas	Joma	CompliancePath
Annan Athletic	(Republic of Ireland) Peter Murphy	(England) Steven Swinglehurst	Halbro	M & S Engineering
Brechin City	(Scotland) Michael Paton	(England) Jonathan Page	Pendle	Glencadam distillery
Cowdenbeath	(Scotland) Gary Bollan	(Scotland) Craig Barr	Erreà	Collier Haulage, Quarrying and Recycling
Edinburgh City	(Scotland) Gary Naysmith	(Scotland) Craig Thomson	Macron	Forth Capital
Elgin City	(Scotland) Gavin Price	(Scotland) Euan Spark	Joma	McDonald & Munro
Queen's Park	(Scotland) Ray McKinnon	(Scotland) David Galt	Admiral	Irn-Bru
Stenhousemuir	(Scotland) Stephen Swift	(Scotland) Callum Tapping	Uhlsport	LOC Hire
Stirling Albion	(Scotland) Kevin Rutkiewicz	(Scotland) Ross McGeachie	Macron	Prudential
Stranraer	(Scotland) Stephen Farrell	(Scotland) Jamie Hamill	Joma	Stena Line

=== Managerial changes ===
Team	Outgoing manager	Manner of departure	Date of vacancy	Position in table	Incoming manager	Date of appointment
Albion Rovers	(Scotland) Kevin Harper	Resigned	8 May 2020	Pre-season	(Scotland) Brian Reid	5 June 2020
Brechin City	(Scotland) Mark Wilson	Sacked	27 October 2020	10th	(Scotland) Michael Paton	6 November 2020
Edinburgh City	(Scotland) James McDonaugh	Promoted to Sporting Director	7 March 2021	5th	(Scotland) Gary Naysmith	9 March 2021
Stenhousemuir	(Scotland) Davie Irons	Mutual consent	20 April 2021	6th	(Scotland) Stephen Swift	27 April 2021

== League summary ==
=== League table ===
Pos	Team	Pld	W	D	L	GF	GA	GD	Pts	Promotion, qualification or relegation
1	Queen's Park (C, P)	22	17	3	2	43	13	+30	54	Promotion to League One
2	Edinburgh City	22	12	2	8	40	27	+13	38	Qualification for the League One play-offs
3	Elgin City	22	12	2	8	39	28	+11	38	Qualification for the League One play-offs
4	Stranraer	22	11	5	6	36	25	+11	38	Qualification for the League One play-offs
5	Stirling Albion	22	10	6	6	32	22	+10	36	
6	Stenhousemuir	22	7	5	10	25	35	−10	26	
7	Albion Rovers	22	7	4	11	25	38	−13	25	
8	Annan Athletic	22	5	7	10	25	27	−2	22	
9	Cowdenbeath	22	5	6	11	15	32	−17	21	
10	Brechin City (R)	22	2	4	16	13	46	−33	10	Qualification for the League Two play-off final

Source: SPFL
Rules for classification: 1) Points; 2) Goal difference; 3) Goals scored; 4) Head-to-to head points; 5) Head-to-head goal difference; 6) Play-off (only for deciding promotion, play-off participation and relegation).
(C) Champions; (P) Promoted; (R) Relegated

== Results ==
Teams play each other two times, making a total of 90 games, with each team playing 18, the league then splits in half for a further 4 matches. This was reduced from the normal 36 due to the coronavirus pandemic.

=== Matches 1–18 ===
Home \ Away	ALB	ANN	BRE	COW	EDC	ELG	QPA	STE	STI	STR
Albion Rovers	—	1–1	0–2	0–0	1–2	3–1	0–3	1–3	0–1	0–2
Annan Athletic	2–3	—	3–0	0–0	0–4	0–3	1–2	5–1	1–2	1–1
Brechin City	2–4	0–0	—	0–0	1–5	1–2	0–2	1–1	0–5	1–4
Cowdenbeath	0–1	0–3	2–0	—	1–3	1–0	0–3	1–1	1–5	1–1
Edinburgh City	5–2	1–1	2–1	0–1	—	1–0	2–3	3–1	2–3	0–1
Elgin City	2–5	1–0	3–0	5–2	1–2	—	0–1	2–0	1–1	2–1
Queen's Park	2–0	1–0	3–0	3–0	3–3	0–0	—	3–1	1–0	3–0
Stenhousemuir	2–0	1–2	2–1	1–0	2–0	2–0	1–3	—	2–2	2–2
Stirling Albion	1–1	1–0	1–0	1–0	0–1	1–2	0–0	1–0	—	0–1
Stranraer	4–0	2–0	2–0	2–0	0–1	1–4	0–1	4–0	2–2	—

Source: SPFL
Legend: Blue = home team win; Yellow = draw; Red = away team win.
For upcoming matches, an "a" indicates there is an article about the rivalry between the two participants.

=== Post-Split Fixtures (Matches 19–22) ===
==== Top half ====
Home \ Away	EDI	ELG	QPA	STI	STR
Edinburgh City	—	2–0	—	0–1	—
Elgin City	—	—	3–2	3–1	—
Queen's Park	2–0	—	—	—	0–1
Stirling Albion	—	—	1–2	—	2–2
Stranraer	2–1	1–4	—	—	—

Source: SPFL
Legend: Blue = home team win; Yellow = draw; Red = away team win.
For upcoming matches, an "a" indicates there is an article about the rivalry between the two participants.

==== Bottom half ====
Home \ Away	ALB	ANN	BRE	COW	STE
Albion Rovers	—	1–0	1–1	—	—
Annan Athletic	—	—	—	1–1	1–1
Brechin City	—	0–3	—	—	0–1
Cowdenbeath	2–0	—	0–2	—	—
Stenhousemuir	0–1	—	—	0–2	—

Source: SPFL
Legend: Blue = home team win; Yellow = draw; Red = away team win.
For upcoming matches, an "a" indicates there is an article about the rivalry between the two participants.

== Season statistics ==
=== Top scorers ===
As of 4 May 2021

Rank	Player	Club	Goals
1	(Scotland) Kane Hester	Elgin City	15
2	(Scotland) Matthew Aitken	Albion Rovers	10
2	(Scotland) Andy Ryan	Stirling Albion	10
4	(Scotland) Thomas Orr	Stranraer	8
5	(Scotland) Josh Campbell	Edinburgh City	7
6	(Scotland) Bob McHugh	Queen's Park	6
6	(Scotland) Simon Murray	Queen's Park	6
6	(Scotland) Botti Biabi	Stenhousemuir	6
6	(Scotland) Mark McGuigan	Stenhousemuir	6
6	(Republic of Ireland) Ruari Paton	Stranraer	6

=== Hat-tricks ===
Player	For	Against	Score	Date
(Scotland) Kane Hester	Elgin City	Cowdenbeath	5–2 (H)	28 November 2020
(Scotland) Liam Henderson	Edinburgh City	Albion Rovers	5–2 (H)	5 December 2020
(Scotland) Kane Hester	Elgin City	Queen's Park	3–2 (H)	4 May 2021

=== Attendances ===
Games were mostly played behind closed doors due to the COVID-19 pandemic. Limited attendance was allowed at some grounds with strict conditions under the Scottish Government Tier system, dependent on the club's geographical location.

== Awards ==
Month	Manager of the Month		Player of the Month	
Month	Manager	Club	Player	Club
October	(Scotland) Ray McKinnon	Queen's Park	(Scotland) Willie Muir	Queen's Park
November	(Scotland) Stephen Farrell	Stranraer	(Scotland) Darryl Duffy	Stranraer
December	(Scotland) Kevin Rutkiewicz	Stirling Albion	(Scotland) Andy Ryan	Stirling Albion
January	N/A	N/A	N/A	N/A
February	N/A	N/A	N/A	N/A
March	(Scotland) Gary Naysmith	Edinburgh City	(Italy) Raffaele De Vita	Edinburgh City
April	(Scotland) Brian Reid	Albion Rovers	(Scotland) Matthew Aitken	Albion Rovers

== League Two play-offs ==
On 9 April the SPFL announced that a decision on whether the 2020–21 play-offs would proceed would be taken on 19 April. Brechin City chairman Ken Ferguson resigned from the SPFL board on 9 April and was replaced by Clyde representative Gordon Thomson, as Brechin sat bottom of the League Two table and would potentially be affected by the decision on whether the play-offs should proceed. The SPFL said on 9 April it would have to determine whether Brora and Kelty met league membership criteria, and noted that they had been declared champions based on curtailed seasons while it was not yet certain that League Two would complete its season. The SPFL confirmed on 29 April that the play-offs would proceed.

The Pyramid play-off was contested between the champions of the 2020–21 Highland Football League (Brora Rangers) and the 2020–21 Lowland Football League (Kelty Hearts). Both clubs were also crowned their regional league champions in the 2019–20 season, but the promotion/relegation playoff was cancelled due to the COVID-19 pandemic.

Kelty won 6–1 on aggregate and then faced the bottom club (Brechin City) in the League Two play-off final, being promoted to League Two for the 2021–22 season after a 3–1 aggregate win. As Brechin City lost the play-off, they were relegated to the Highland League since they were north of 56.4513N latitude (middle of the Tay Road Bridge).

=== Pyramid play-off ===
==== First leg ====
4 May 2021	Brora Rangers	0–2	Kelty Hearts	Brora
19:00		Report	Easton 22'; Higginbotham 56' (pen.)	Stadium: Dudgeon Park; Attendance: 0 Referee: Grant Irvine

==== Second leg ====
8 May 2021	Kelty Hearts	4–1 (6–1 agg.)	Brora Rangers	Kelty
15:00	Austin 29', 58', 62'; Easton 90+3'	Report	Morrison 22'	Stadium: New Central Park; Attendance: 0 Referee: Euan Anderson

=== Final ===
==== First leg ====
18 May 2021	Kelty Hearts	2–1	Brechin City	Kelty
19:45	Higginbotham 16'; Russell 45'	Report	Page 23'	Stadium: New Central Park; Attendance: 250; Referee: Gavin Duncan

==== Second leg ====
23 May 2021	Brechin City	0–1 (1–3 agg.)	Kelty Hearts	Brechin
15:00		Report	Tidser 88'	Stadium: Glebe Park; Attendance: 250; Referee: Craig Napier
