= 2017–18 Scottish League Two =

Scottish League Two
- Season: 2017–18
- Champions: Montrose
- Promoted: Montrose; Stenhousemuir
- Matches: 180
- Goals: 500 (2.78 per match)
- Top goalscorer: David Goodwillie (25 goals)
- Biggest home win: Peterhead 7–0 Elgin City (2 January 2018)
- Biggest away win: Stirling Albion 0–5 Montrose (7 April 2018)
- Highest scoring: Montrose 2–6 Peterhead (30 December 2017)
- Longest winning run: 7 matches: Peterhead
- Longest unbeaten run: 10 matches: Montrose
- Longest winless run: 24 matches: Cowdenbeath
- Longest losing run: 5 matches: Cowdenbeath; Edinburgh City
- Highest attendance: 2,380; Montrose 1–1 Elgin City (28 April 2018)
- Lowest attendance: 216; Cowdenbeath 0–2 Peterhead (24 February 2018)
- Total attendance: 88,681
- Average attendance: 492
- All statistics correct as of 12 May 2018.

The 2017–18 Scottish League Two (known as Ladbrokes League Two for sponsorship reasons) was the 24th season in the current format of 10 teams in the fourth-tier of Scottish football. The last placed team entered a play-off with a team nominated by the Scottish Football Association from outside the SPFL determining which team enters League Two in the 2018–19 season. The fixtures were published on 23 June 2017.

Ten teams contested the league: Annan Athletic, Berwick Rangers, Clyde, Cowdenbeath, Edinburgh City, Elgin City, Montrose, Peterhead, Stenhousemuir and Stirling Albion.

== Prize money ==
In April 2018, the SPFL confirmed the prize money to be allocated to the league members at the conclusion of the competitions. The League Two winners would receive £64,000 with a total pot of £24.5 million to be distributed across the four divisions.

== Teams ==
The following teams changed division since the 2016–17 season.

=== To League Two ===
Relegated from Scottish League One

- Peterhead
- Stenhousemuir

=== From League Two ===
Promoted to Scottish League One

- Arbroath
- Forfar Athletic

=== Stadia and locations ===
Annan Athletic	Berwick Rangers	Clyde	Cowdenbeath
Galabank	Shielfield Park	Broadwood Stadium	Central Park
Capacity: 2,504	Capacity: 4,099	Capacity: 8,086	Capacity: 4,309
Edinburgh City	2017–18 Scottish League Two (Scotland)		Elgin City
Ainslie Park	2017–18 Scottish League Two (Scotland)		Borough Briggs
Capacity: 3,000	2017–18 Scottish League Two (Scotland)		Capacity: 4,520
Montrose	Peterhead	Stenhousemuir	Stirling Albion
Links Park	Balmoor	Ochilview Park	Forthbank Stadium
Capacity: 4,936	Capacity: 3,150	Capacity: 3,746	Capacity: 3,808

=== Personnel and kits ===
Team	Manager	Captain	Kit manufacturer	Shirt sponsor
Annan Athletic	(Republic of Ireland) Peter Murphy	(Scotland) Peter Watson	Stanno	M&S Engineering Ltd
Berwick Rangers	(Scotland) Robbie Horn	(Scotland) Steven Notman	Mitre	JMS Harkin (H); P J Brown (A)
Clyde	(Scotland) Danny Lennon	(Scotland) Kevin Nicoll	Hummel	Advance Construction Group (H); Rock Regen (A)
Cowdenbeath	(Scotland) Gary Bollan	(Scotland) Scott Rumsby	Uhlsport	Subsea Pressure Controls
Edinburgh City	(Scotland) James McDonaugh	(England) Josh Walker	Joma	CMC Property
Elgin City	(Scotland) Gavin Price	(Scotland) Jon Paul McGovern	EC 1893	McDonald & Munro
Montrose	(Scotland) Stewart Petrie	(Scotland) Paul Watson	Nike	Carnegie Fuels Ltd
Peterhead	(Scotland) Jim McInally	(Scotland) David McCracken	Adidas	Independent Oilfield Services
Stenhousemuir	(Scotland) Brown Ferguson	(Scotland) Michael Dunlop	Mitre	Warriors in the Community
Stirling Albion	(Scotland) Dave Mackay	(Scotland) Willie Robertson	Macron	Prudential

=== Managerial changes ===
Team	Outgoing manager	Manner of departure	Date of vacancy	Position in table	Incoming manager	Date of appointment
Clyde	(Scotland) Jon-Paul McGovern & (Scotland) Peter MacDonald (joint interim)	End of interim	6 May 2017	Pre-season	(Scotland) Jim Chapman	20 May 2017
Annan Athletic	(Scotland) Jim Chapman	Signed by Clyde	20 May 2017	Pre-season	(Republic of Ireland) Peter Murphy	2 June 2017
Cowdenbeath	(Scotland) Gary Locke	Signed by Heart of Midlothian	1 July 2017	Pre-season	(Scotland) Billy Brown	1 July 2017
Berwick Rangers	(United States) John Coughlin	Sacked	22 August 2017	9th	(Scotland) Robbie Horn	29 August 2017
Edinburgh City	(Scotland) Gary Jardine	Resigned	30 September 2017	9th	(Scotland) James McDonaugh	10 October 2017
Elgin City	(Scotland) Jim Weir	Signed by Forfar Athletic	1 October 2017	6th	(Scotland) Gavin Price	12 October 2017
Cowdenbeath	(Scotland) Billy Brown	Resigned	31 October 2017	10th	(Scotland) Gary Bollan	14 November 2017
Clyde	(Scotland) Jim Chapman	Sacked	31 October 2017	8th	(Scotland) Danny Lennon	13 November 2017

== League summary ==
=== League table ===
Pos	Team	Pld	W	D	L	GF	GA	GD	Pts	Promotion, qualification or relegation
1	Montrose (C, P)	36	23	8	5	60	35	+25	77	Promotion to League One
2	Peterhead	36	24	4	8	79	39	+40	76	Qualification for the League One play-offs
3	Stirling Albion	36	16	7	13	61	52	+9	55	Qualification for the League One play-offs
4	Stenhousemuir (O, P)	36	15	9	12	56	47	+9	54	Qualification for the League One play-offs
5	Clyde	36	14	9	13	52	50	+2	51	
6	Elgin City	36	14	7	15	54	61	−7	49	
7	Annan Athletic	36	12	11	13	49	41	+8	47	
8	Berwick Rangers	36	9	10	17	31	59	−28	37	
9	Edinburgh City	36	7	9	20	37	62	−25	30	
10	Cowdenbeath (O)	36	4	10	22	23	56	−33	22	Qualification for the League Two play-off final

Source: SPFL
Rules for classification: 1) Points; 2) Goal difference; 3) Number of goals scored
(C) Champions; (O) Play-off winners; (P) Promoted

=== Positions by round ===
The table lists the positions of teams after each week of matches. In order to preserve chronological progress, any postponed matches are not included in the round at which they were originally scheduled, but added to the full round they were played immediately afterwards. For example, if a match is scheduled for matchday 13, but then postponed and played between days 16 and 17, it will be added to the standings for day 16.

Leader - Promotion to 2018–19 Scottish League One
Qualification to League One play-offs
Qualification to League Two play-offs

Team \ Round	1	2	3	4	5	6	7	8	9	10	11	12	13	14	15	16	17	18	19	20	21	22	23	24	25	26	27	28	29	30	31	32	33	34	35	36
Montrose	2	3	2	2	2	2	4	3	2	2	2	2	1	2	1	1	1	1	1	1	1	1	1	1	1	1	2	2	2	1	2	2	1	1	1	1
Peterhead	4	2	3	4	4	3	2	4	3	3	3	3	4	1	2	2	2	2	2	2	2	2	2	2	2	2	1	1	1	2	1	1	2	2	2	2
Stirling Albion	3	1	1	1	1	1	1	1	1	1	1	1	2	3	3	3	4	4	5	4	5	5	4	4	3	3	3	3	3	3	3	3	3	3	3	3
Stenhousemuir	7	7	4	6	3	4	3	2	4	4	4	4	5	5	6	4	3	3	3	3	3	3	3	3	4	4	4	4	4	4	5	5	4	4	4	4
Clyde	9	5	8	8	6	8	7	8	8	8	8	8	8	8	8	8	8	8	8	9	9	8	8	8	7	7	7	7	7	6	4	6	6	5	5	5
Elgin City	6	8	6	3	5	7	5	6	5	5	5	5	3	4	4	6	6	6	6	6	6	6	5	5	5	5	5	5	5	5	6	4	5	6	6	6
Annan Athletic	8	9	7	9	7	6	8	7	6	7	7	7	6	6	5	5	5	5	4	5	4	4	6	6	6	6	6	6	6	7	7	7	7	7	7	7
Berwick Rangers	1	6	9	5	8	5	6	5	7	6	6	6	7	7	7	7	7	7	7	7	7	7	7	7	8	8	8	9	9	9	9	9	9	9	8	8
Edinburgh City	10	10	10	10	10	9	9	9	9	9	9	9	9	9	9	9	9	9	9	8	8	9	9	9	9	9	9	8	8	8	8	8	8	8	9	9
Cowdenbeath	5	4	5	7	9	10	10	10	10	10	10	10	10	10	10	10	10	10	10	10	10	10	10	10	10	10	10	10	10	10	10	10	10	10	10	10

Updated: 28 April 2018

== Results ==
Teams play each other four times, twice in the first half of the season (home and away) and twice in the second half of the season (home and away), making a total of 180 games, with each team playing 36.

=== First half of season ===
Home \ Away	ANN	BER	CLY	COW	EDC	ELG	MON	PET	STE	STI
Annan Athletic	—	0–0	0–0	1–0	2–1	2–0	0–1	1–2	1–1	1–1
Berwick Rangers	1–5	—	3–1	1–0	1–1	3–2	0–1	2–3	0–0	1–0
Clyde	2–1	0–0	—	1–1	2–3	2–4	0–0	1–4	1–1	1–1
Cowdenbeath	1–1	0–1	0–3	—	1–0	1–3	1–3	0–4	1–1	0–3
Edinburgh City	0–1	1–0	0–3	0–0	—	0–3	1–3	0–3	1–2	1–2
Elgin City	0–1	5–1	3–2	1–1	1–1	—	3–0	0–2	2–0	0–2
Montrose	1–1	3–0	3–2	1–0	1–0	3–0	—	2–6	1–1	1–3
Peterhead	1–0	0–2	2–1	3–2	3–0	3–0	1–1	—	2–3	2–4
Stenhousemuir	1–3	3–0	1–1	1–0	3–0	4–1	0–1	3–1	—	2–3
Stirling Albion	3–2	4–0	2–3	1–0	2–0	2–2	0–1	0–1	1–2	—

Source: Scottish League Two
Legend: Blue = home team win; Yellow = draw; Red = away team win.

=== Second half of season ===
Home \ Away	ANN	BER	CLY	COW	EDC	ELG	MON	PET	STE	STI
Annan Athletic	—	0–0	1–1	1–1	2–3	4–1	0–1	3–3	2–0	3–1
Berwick Rangers	0–2	—	0–1	1–0	1–1	2–2	2–2	1–3	2–2	0–1
Clyde	0–0	1–2	—	2–0	3–2	1–0	3–0	1–0	0–3	2–1
Cowdenbeath	0–2	1–3	1–0	—	0–2	3–1	0–3	0–2	1–1	1–2
Edinburgh City	3–2	3–0	1–3	1–1	—	4–0	0–2	0–0	1–4	2–2
Elgin City	2–1	3–0	2–1	1–0	1–1	—	2–2	0–1	2–0	3–0
Montrose	2–1	1–0	1–3	1–1	3–0	1–1	—	3–2	1–0	2–1
Peterhead	1–0	1–1	3–0	1–0	2–1	7–0	0–1	—	1–2	4–3
Stenhousemuir	3–2	4–0	2–3	1–2	1–0	0–2	0–2	1–4	—	2–1
Stirling Albion	3–0	2–0	2–1	2–2	2–2	3–1	0–5	0–1	1–1	—

Source: Scottish League Two
Legend: Blue = home team win; Yellow = draw; Red = away team win.

== Season statistics ==
=== Scoring ===
==== Top scorers ====
As of matches played on 28 April 2018

Rank	Player	Club	Goals
1	(Scotland) David Goodwillie	Clyde	25
2	(Scotland) Darren L. Smith	Stirling Albion	22
3	(Scotland) Rory McAllister	Peterhead	20
3	(Scotland) Mark McGuigan	Stenhousemuir	20
5	(Scotland) Blair Henderson	Annan Athletic	16
6	(Scotland) Russell McLean	Peterhead	15
7	(Scotland) Aidan Smith	Annan Athletic	12
8	(Scotland) Lewis Milne	Montrose	11
8	(Scotland) Chris Templeman	Montrose	11
10	(Scotland) Brian Cameron	Elgin City	10

==== Hat-tricks ====
Player	For	Against	Result	Date	Ref
(Scotland) Blair Henderson	Annan Athletic	Stenhousemuir	3–1	9 December 2017	
(Scotland) Russell McLean	Peterhead	Annan Athletic	3–3	20 February 2018	
(Scotland) Lewis Milne	Montrose	Stirling Albion	5–0	7 April 2018	
(Scotland) Blair Henderson	Annan Athletic	Stirling Albion	3–1	21 April 2018	

=== Discipline ===
==== Player ====
===== Yellow cards =====
As of matches played on 28 April 2018

Rank	Player	Club	Cards
1	(Scotland) Kevin Nicoll	Clyde	13
2	(Scotland) Peter Watson	Annan Athletic	12
2	(Scotland) Fraser Mullen	Cowdenbeath	12
4	(England) Steven Swinglehurst	Annan Athletic	11
4	(Scotland) Craig Thomson	Edinburgh City	11
6	(Scotland) Robbie Buchanan	Cowdenbeath	10
6	(Scotland) Kyle Miller	Cowdenbeath	10
6	(Scotland) Darryl McHardy	Elgin City	10
6	(Scotland) Thomas Reilly	Elgin City	10

===== Red cards =====
As of matches played on 28 April 2018

Rank	Player	Club	Cards
1	(Scotland) Kevin Nicoll	Clyde	2
2	24 players		1

==== Club ====
===== Yellow cards =====
As of matches played on 28 April 2018

Rank	Club	Cards
1	Annan Athletic	74
2	Cowdenbeath	72
3	Berwick Rangers	67

===== Red cards =====
As of matches played on 28 April 2018

Rank	Club	Cards
1	Clyde	5
1	Cowdenbeath	5
3	Annan Athletic	4
3	Edinburgh City	4

=== Attendances ===
Pos	Team	Total	High	Low	Average	Change
1	Montrose	13,023	2,380	353	723	+19.5%
2	Stirling Albion	11,839	1,012	395	657	+2.8%
3	Peterhead	11,013	1,049	394	611	+21.2%
4	Elgin City	10,933	883	393	607	−11.6%
5	Clyde	8,865	804	402	492	−6.5%
6	Berwick Rangers	7,807	596	295	433	+1.6%
7	Stenhousemuir	6,598	976	220	420	−1.9%
8	Annan Athletic	6,236	507	248	346	−10.4%
9	Edinburgh City	5,794	464	223	321	−19.7%
10	Cowdenbeath	5,751	406	216	319	−7.5%
	League total	88,681	2,380	216	492	−8.4%

Updated to games played on 28 April 2018

== Awards ==
=== Monthly awards ===
Month	Manager of the Month		Player of the Month		Ref.
Month	Manager	Club	Player	Club	Ref.
August	(Scotland) Dave Mackay	Stirling Albion	(Scotland) Darren L. Smith	Stirling Albion	
September	(Scotland) Brown Ferguson	Stenhousemuir	(Scotland) Mark McGuigan	Stenhousemuir	
October	(Scotland) Gavin Price	Elgin City	(Scotland) Craig Johnston	Montrose	
November	(Scotland) Stewart Petrie	Montrose	(Scotland) Cammy Ballantyne	Montrose	
December	(Scotland) Jim McInally	Peterhead	(Scotland) Rory McAllister	Peterhead	
January	(Scotland) Jim McInally	Peterhead	(Scotland) Darren L. Smith	Stirling Albion	
February	(Scotland) Dave Mackay	Stirling Albion	(Scotland) Peter MacDonald	Stirling Albion	
March	(Northern Ireland) Danny Lennon	Clyde	(Scotland) Chris McStay	Clyde	

== League Two play-offs ==
The first round was contested between the winners of the 2017–18 Highland Football League (Cove Rangers) and the 2017–18 Lowland Football League (Spartans). The winners then played against the bottom club in League Two, and would have been promoted to League Two for the 2018–19 season if they had won.

Due to fixture congestion in the Highland League preventing a champion being crowned in time, the dates for the first round were pushed back a week.

=== First round ===
==== First leg ====
28 April 2018	Cove Rangers	4–0	Spartans	Inverurie
15:00	Megginson 42'; McManus 49' (pen.), 67'; Watson 52'	The Scotsman		Stadium: Harlaw Park; Referee: David Munro

==== Second leg ====
1 May 2018	Spartans	2–1 (2–5 agg.)	Cove Rangers	Edinburgh
19:45	Dishington 78'; Atkinson 87'	Edinburgh Evening News	McManus 67'	Stadium: Ainslie Park; Attendance: 655; Referee: Steven Reid

=== Second round ===
==== First leg ====
5 May 2018	Cove Rangers	0–0	Cowdenbeath	Inverurie
15:00		Report		Stadium: Harlaw Park; Attendance: 650; Referee: John McKendrick

==== Second leg ====
12 May 2018	Cowdenbeath	3–2 (3–2 agg.)	Cove Rangers	Cowdenbeath
14:00	Swann 7' (pen.), 50'; Smith 70'	Report	Megginson 9', 22'	Stadium: Central Park; Attendance: 1762; Referee: Steven Kirkland
