= 2019–20 Scottish League Two =

Scottish League Two
- Season: 2019–20
- Dates: 3 August 2019 – 15 April 2020
- Champions: Cove Rangers
- Promoted: Cove Rangers
- Matches: 137
- Goals: 414 (3.02 per match)
- Top goalscorer: Mitch Megginson (24 goals)
- Biggest home win: Cove Rangers 5–0 Edinburgh City (3 August 2019); Annan Athletic 6–1 Cove Rangers (30 November 2019)
- Biggest away win: Stirling Albion 1–7 Cove Rangers (10 March 2020)
- Highest scoring: Albion Rovers 4–4 Cove Rangers (10 August 2019); Stirling Albion 1–7 Cove Rangers (10 March 2020)
- Longest winning run: 6 matches: Cove Rangers; Cowdenbeath
- Longest unbeaten run: 8 matches: Cove Rangers
- Longest winless run: 11 matches: Brechin City
- Longest losing run: 6 matches: Annan Athletic
- Highest attendance: 1,264; Cove Rangers 2–0 Elgin City (28 December 2019)
- Lowest attendance: 194; Edinburgh City 4–0 Stenhousemuir (29 October 2019)
- Total attendance: 66,675
- Average attendance: 486(18)
- All statistics correct as of 1 May 2020.

The 2019–20 Scottish League Two (known as Ladbrokes League Two for sponsorship reasons) was the 26th season in the current format of 10 teams in the fourth-tier of Scottish football. Ten teams contested the league: Albion Rovers, Annan Athletic, Brechin City, Cove Rangers, Cowdenbeath, Edinburgh City, Elgin City, Queen's Park, Stenhousemuir and Stirling Albion.

The season began on 3 August 2019 and was scheduled to end on 2 May 2020. On 13 March 2020 all SPFL leagues were indefinitely suspended due to the COVID-19 coronavirus outbreak. On 8 April, with the pandemic continuing, the SPFL board proposed to curtail the 2019–20 League Two season and use the points per game earned by each team to date as the final standings. The plan was approved on 15 April, meaning the league was declared over and Cove Rangers were crowned champions.

== Teams ==
The following teams have changed division since the 2018–19 season.

=== To League Two ===
Promoted from Highland Football League

- Cove Rangers

Relegated from League One

- Stenhousemuir
- Brechin City

=== From League Two ===
Relegated to Lowland Football League

- Berwick Rangers

Promoted to League One

- Peterhead
- Clyde

=== Stadia and locations ===
Albion Rovers	Annan Athletic	Brechin City	Cove Rangers
Cliftonhill	Galabank	Glebe Park	Balmoral Stadium
Capacity: 1,238	Capacity: 2,504	Capacity: 4,123	Capacity: 2,602
Cowdenbeath	Location of teams in 2019–20 Scottish League Two		Edinburgh City
Central Park	Location of teams in 2019–20 Scottish League Two		Ainslie Park
Capacity: 4,309	Location of teams in 2019–20 Scottish League Two		Capacity: 3,534
Elgin City	Queen's Park	Stenhousemuir	Stirling Albion
Borough Briggs	Hampden Park	Ochilview Park	Forthbank Stadium
Capacity: 4,520	Capacity: 51,866	Capacity: 3,746	Capacity: 3,808

=== Personnel and kits ===
Team	Manager	Captain	Kit manufacturer	Shirt sponsor
Albion Rovers	(Scotland) Kevin Harper	(Scotland) Aron Lynas	Joma	K & T Plant Hire Ltd
Annan Athletic	(Republic of Ireland) Peter Murphy	(England) Steven Swinglehurst	Halbro	M & S Engineering
Brechin City	(Scotland) Mark Wilson	(Scotland) Paul McManus	Pendle	Glencadam distillery
Cove Rangers	(Scotland) Paul Hartley	(Scotland) Mitch Megginson	Adidas	ACE Group
Cowdenbeath	(Scotland) Gary Bollan	(Scotland) Craig Barr	Errea	Delta 70 Mfg Ltd
Edinburgh City	(Scotland) James McDonaugh	(Scotland) Craig Thomson	Macron	Forth Capital
Elgin City	(Scotland) Gavin Price	(Scotland) Shane Sutherland	EV2 Sportswear	McDonald & Munro
Queen's Park	(Scotland) Ray McKinnon	(Scotland) David Galt	Under Armour	Irn-Bru
Stenhousemuir	(Scotland) Davie Irons	(Scotland) Andy Munro	Uhlsport	LOC Hire
Stirling Albion	(Scotland) Kevin Rutkiewicz	(Scotland) Ross McGeachie	Macron	Prudential

=== Managerial changes ===
Team	Outgoing manager	Manner of departure	Date of vacancy	Position in table	Incoming manager	Date of appointment
Brechin City	(Scotland) Barry Smith	Sacked	19 August 2019	10th	(Scotland) Mark Wilson	4 September 2019
Stenhousemuir	(Scotland) Colin McMenamin	Sacked	17 September 2019	8th	(Scotland) Davie Irons	25 September 2019
Queen's Park	(Scotland) Mark Roberts	Sacked	31 December 2019	7th	(Scotland) Ray McKinnon	2 January 2020

== League summary ==
=== League table ===
Pos	Team	Pld	W	D	L	GF	GA	GD	Pts	PPG	Promotion (Note: All play-off matches were cancelled, as clubs voted to curtail the season due to the COVID-19 pandemic.)
1	Cove Rangers (C, P)	28	22	2	4	76	34	+42	68	2.43	Promotion to League One
2	Edinburgh City	27	17	4	6	49	28	+21	55	2.04	
3	Elgin City	28	12	7	9	48	34	+14	43	1.54	
4	Cowdenbeath	27	12	5	10	37	35	+2	41	1.52	
5	Queen's Park	28	11	7	10	37	35	+2	40	1.43	
6	Stirling Albion	28	10	6	12	34	35	−1	36	1.29	
7	Annan Athletic	27	9	4	14	33	54	−21	31	1.15	
8	Stenhousemuir	28	7	8	13	32	48	−16	29	1.04	
9	Albion Rovers	26	6	6	14	37	51	−14	24	0.92	
10	Brechin City	27	4	5	18	31	60	−29	17	0.63	

Source: SPFL
Rules for classification: 1) Points per game.
(C) Champions; (P) Promoted

== Results ==
Teams play each other four times, twice in the first half of the season (home and away) and twice in the second half of the season (home and away), making a total of 180 games, with each team playing 36.

=== First half of season ===
Home \ Away	ALB	ANN	BRE	COV	COW	EDC	ELG	QPA	STE	STI
Albion Rovers	—	4–2	0–1	4–4	N/A	1–3	1–3	2–0	2–1	2–1
Annan Athletic	3–2	—	5–2	6–1	1–0	0–2	1–1	3–2	1–1	0–0
Brechin City	0–0	0–1	—	2–4	2–1	2–3	2–1	0–3	1–2	1–1
Cove Rangers	3–0	3–0	3–0	—	3–2	5–0	2–0	3–0	2–1	1–0
Cowdenbeath	1–0	3–1	2–1	1–3	—	1–0	0–0	1–0	3–1	1–0
Edinburgh City	3–2	4–0	2–1	2–1	2–0	—	1–1	2–1	4–0	1–0
Elgin City	2–2	4–0	3–1	0–2	3–0	3–3	—	3–1	0–1	1–2
Queen's Park	1–1	1–2	5–2	1–3	0–3	2–1	0–0	—	1–1	1–1
Stenhousemuir	2–3	1–2	1–0	3–2	0–3	1–3	2–2	0–3	—	0–2
Stirling Albion	3–0	2–0	2–4	1–2	0–0	0–1	1–0	0–1	1–1	—

Source: Scottish League Two
Legend: Blue = home team win; Yellow = draw; Red = away team win.

=== Second half of season ===
Home \ Away	ALB	ANN	BRE	COV	COW	EDC	ELG	QPA	STE	STI
Albion Rovers	—	N/A	4–1	2–2	N/A	N/A	1–2	N/A	N/A	0–3
Annan Athletic	2–1	—	N/A	0–0	N/A	N/A	0–4	N/A	0–3	2–3
Brechin City	N/A	N/A	—	1–5	N/A	N/A	1–2	0–0	N/A	0–2
Cove Rangers	N/A	2–0	3–2	—	3–1	2–1	N/A	2–0	N/A	N/A
Cowdenbeath	2–1	3–1	3–2	N/A	—	1–1	N/A	N/A	N/A	1–4
Edinburgh City	3–0	3–0	0–0	N/A	N/A	—	N/A	1–2	N/A	0–1
Elgin City	N/A	N/A	N/A	3–0	3–2	0–1	—	N/A	2–3	3–1
Queen's Park	2–2	2–0	N/A	N/A	1–0	2–0	N/A	—	2–1	N/A
Stenhousemuir	1–0	N/A	2–2	0–3	2–2	1–2	N/A	0–0	—	N/A
Stirling Albion	N/A	N/A	N/A	1–7	N/A	N/A	1–2	1–3	0–0	—

Source: Scottish League Two
Legend: Blue = home team win; Yellow = draw; Red = away team win.

== Season statistics ==
=== Scoring ===
==== Top scorers ====
Rank	Player	Club	Goals
1	(Scotland) Mitch Megginson	Cove Rangers	24
2	(Scotland) Shane Sutherland	Elgin City	16
3	(Scotland) Jamie Masson	Cove Rangers	15
4	(Scotland) Salim Kouider-Aïssa	Queen's Park	13
5	(Scotland) Declan Byrne	Albion Rovers	11

==== Hat-tricks ====
Player	For	Against	Score	Date	Ref
(Scotland) Tommy Muir	Annan Athletic	Cove Rangers	6–1 (H)	30 November 2019	
(Scotland) Darryl Duffy	Stirling Albion	Albion Rovers	3–0 (A)	4 January 2020	

=== Attendances ===
Pos	Team	Total	High	Low	Average	Change
1	Cove Rangers (Note: Club was playing in the Highland League during the previous season.)	10,709	1,264	391	764	n/a
2	Elgin City	8,902	1,002	453	635	+2.1%
3	Queen's Park	8,159	837	449	582	−4.7%
4	Stirling Albion	7,324	741	423	563	−4.1%
5	Stenhousemuir (Note: Club was playing in League One during the previous season.)	8,134	824	336	542	−5.1%
6	Brechin City	5,535	705	338	425	−26.7%
7	Cowdenbeath	4,904	448	221	350	−1.1%
8	Annan Athletic	4,858	459	211	347	−12.8%
9	Edinburgh City	4,541	494	194	324	−19.2%
10	Albion Rovers	3,609	484	209	300	+4.9%
	League total	66,675	1,264	194	486	−3.6%

== Awards ==
=== Monthly awards ===
Month	Manager of the Month		Player of the Month		Ref.
Month	Manager	Club	Player	Club	Ref.
August	(Scotland) Paul Hartley	Cove Rangers	(Scotland) Declan Glass	Cove Rangers	
September	(Scotland) Gary Bollan	Cowdenbeath	(Scotland) Craig Barr	Cowdenbeath	
October	(Scotland) Gavin Price	Elgin City	(Scotland) Shane Sutherland	Elgin City	
November	(Scotland) Mark Roberts	Queen's Park	(Scotland) Salim Kouider Aïssa	Queen's Park	
December	(Scotland) James McDonaugh	Edinburgh City	(Scotland) Liam Henderson	Edinburgh City	
January	(Scotland) Paul Hartley	Cove Rangers	(Scotland) Mitch Megginson	Cove Rangers	
February	(Scotland) Ray McKinnon	Queen's Park	(France) Dylan Bikey	Stirling Albion	
