= Shane Sutherland =

Scottish footballer (born 1990)

Personal information
- Date of birth: 23 October 1990 (age 36)
- Place of birth: Wick, Scotland
- Position: Striker

Team information
- Current team: Brora Rangers

Senior career*
Years	Team	Apps	(Gls)
2010–2013	Inverness Caledonian Thistle	77	(3)
2010	→ Elgin City (loan)	17	(5)
2013–2015	Elgin City	70	(23)
2015–2016	Peterhead	35	(13)
2016–2019	Elgin City	54	(34)
2019	Peterhead	13	(2)
2019–2020	Elgin City	26	(16)
2020–2023	Inverness Caledonian Thistle	54	(13)
2024–	Brora Rangers	0	(0)
- * Club domestic league appearances and goals as of 18:48, 17 December 2023 (UTC)

Shane Sutherland (born 23 October 1990) is a Scottish professional footballer who plays as a striker for Brora Rangers.

Sutherland has previously played for Inverness Caledonian Thistle, Elgin City and Peterhead.

== Career ==
Sutherland made his senior début for Elgin City in the Third Division on 23 January 2010, while on loan from Inverness Caledonian Thistle.

He was released by Inverness Caledonian Thistle at the end of the 2012–13 season, and signed for Elgin City in July 2013. After two season with Elgin, Sutherland moved to Scottish League One side Peterhead in June 2015, signing a one-year contract. At the end of his contract Sutherland returned to Borough Briggs for his third spell with Elgin. In January 2019 he returned to Peterhead.

On 16 January 2020, Elgin announced that Sutherland would be leaving at the conclusion of the 2019–20 season to rejoin his first club, Inverness Caledonian Thistle.

However, due to an extensive ACL injury, Sutherland was released by the club, which ignited controversy after Sutherland claimed to have been released by email and was having to fund the surgeries himself, which Inverness denied by claiming they had adhered to employment law and that the club was paying for specialist medical support.

He returned to football in 2024 signing for Highland League side Brora Rangers, signing a three-year contract.

== Career statistics ==
As of match played 23 October 2021

Appearances and goals by club, season and competition
Club	Season	League			FA Cup		League Cup		Other		Total	
Club	Season	Division	Apps	Goals	Apps	Goals	Apps	Goals	Apps	Goals	Apps	Goals
Inverness Caledonian Thistle	2009–10	Scottish First Division	0	0	0	0	0	0	0	0	0	0
Inverness Caledonian Thistle	2010–11	Scottish Premier League	29	2	2	0	1	0	0	0	32	2
Inverness Caledonian Thistle	2011–12	Scottish Premier League	27	1	1	0	1	0	0	0	29	1
Inverness Caledonian Thistle	2012–13	Scottish Premier League	21	0	1	0	3	0	0	0	25	0
Inverness Caledonian Thistle	Total		77	3	4	0	5	0	0	0	86	3
Elgin City (loan)	2009–10	Scottish Third Division	17	5	0	0	0	0	0	0	17	5
Elgin City	2013–14	Scottish League Two	36	14	2	0	1	0	1 (Note: Appearances in the Scottish Challenge Cup)	1	40	15
Elgin City	2014–15	Scottish League Two	34	9	4	3	1	0	1	0	40	12
Elgin City	Total		70	23	6	3	2	0	2	1	80	27
Peterhead	2015–16	Scottish League One	35	13	1	0	1	0	6 (Note: Four appearances in the Scottish Challenge Cup and two in the Championship play-offs)	0	43	13
Elgin City	2016–17	Scottish League Two	24	18	3	5	4	0	2	1	33	24
Elgin City	2017–18	Scottish League Two	9	5	0	0	0	0	0	0	9	5
Elgin City	2018–19	Scottish League Two	21	11	3	0	4	0	1	0	29	11
Elgin City	Total		54	34	6	5	8	0	3	1	71	40
Peterhead	2018–19	Scottish League Two	13	2	0	0	0	0	0	0	13	2
Elgin City	2019–20	Scottish League Two	26	16	2	1	4	4	5	5	37	26
Inverness Caledonian Thistle	2020–21	Scottish Championship	24	3	3	1	3	2	0	0	30	6
Inverness Caledonian Thistle	2021–22	Scottish Championship	9	2	0	0	4	1	1	0	14	3
Inverness Caledonian Thistle	Total		33	5	3	1	7	3	1	0	44	9
Career total			325	101	22	10	27	6	17	7	391	125

== Honours ==
=== Individual ===
- PFA Scotland League Two Team of the Year (1): 2014–15
- Scottish League One Player of the Month (1): January 2016
- Scottish League Two Player of the Month (1): October 2016
