= Scottish Junior Football East Region Central Division =

- Founded: 2002
- Folded: 2013
- Country: Scotland
- Promotion to: East Premier League
- Relegation to: no relegation
- Domestic cup(s): Scottish Junior Cup
- Last champions: Kinnoull (2012–13)
- Website: East Region SJFA

The Scottish Junior Football East Region Central Division was a third-tier division of the East Region of the Scottish Junior Football Association.

The league came into existence under the 'Central' name for the 2006–07 season, although a 'Fife District league' had been in place below the East Super League since 2002–03, using the structure of a common 'East Region' top tier and lower regional divisions in place of the old structure of three separate regional leagues in that part of Scotland, with the Fife Junior Football League the historic local competition.

The Central Division was dissolved for the start of the 2013–14 season and member clubs were split between two expanded North and South divisions as part of a wider East Region league restructuring.

== Final Members ==
| Club | Location | Home Ground | Finishing position 2012–13 |
|---|---|---|---|
| Bankfoot Athletic | Bankfoot | Coronation Park | 12th |
| Crossgates Primrose | Crossgates | Humbug Park | 10th |
| Dundonald Bluebell | Cardenden | Moorside Park | 3rd |
| Kinnoull | Perth | Tulloch Park | 1st |
| Kirkcaldy YM | Kirkcaldy | Denfield Park | 2nd |
| Lochgelly Albert | Lochgelly | Gardiners Park | 8th |
| Lochore Welfare | Crosshill | Central Park | 5th |
| Luncarty | Luncarty | Brownlands Park | 13th |
| Newburgh | Newburgh | East Shore Park | 4th |
| Rosyth Recreation | Rosyth | New Recreation Park | 6th |
| Scone Thistle | Scone | Farquharson Park | 11th |
| Steelend Victoria | Steelend | Woodside Park | 9th |
| Thornton Hibs | Thornton | Memorial Park | 7th |

== Winners ==
- As Fife District, one of three third-tier divisions:
  - 2002–03: Kelty Hearts
  - 2003–04: Thornton Hibs
  - 2004–05: Hill of Beath Hawthorn
  - 2005–06: Oakley United (Note: Oakley United were promoted to the Super League. Runners-up St Andrews United were promoted to the new Premier League, along with Rosyth (3rd) and Kelty Hearts (4th).)
- As East Region Central, one of three third-tier divisions:
  - 2006–07: Dundonald Bluebell
  - 2007–08: Ballingry Rovers
  - 2008–09: St Andrews United
  - 2009–10: Thornton Hibs (2)
  - 2010–11: Oakley United (2)
  - 2011–12: Jeanfield Swifts
  - 2012–13: Kinnoull
