= Bankfoot Athletic F.C. =

Former association football club in Scotland

Bankfoot Athletic
- Full name: Bankfoot Athletic Football Club
- Nickname(s): Bankies
- Founded: 1919
- Dissolved: 2014
- Ground: Coronation Park; Newhall Street; Bankfoot
- Capacity: 1000

Bankfoot Athletic Football Club were a Scottish junior football club based in Bankfoot, near Perth.

The SJFA restructured prior to the 2006–07 season, and Athletic found themselves in the twelve-team East Region, Central Division. They finished twelfth (bottom) in their first season in the division.

The club spent the 2013–14 season in abeyance owing to a lack of committee members and at the Scottish Junior Football Association's AGM on 21 June 2014 it was announced that Bankfoot had withdrawn as members of the SJFA.

== Notable former players ==
- Paul Sturrock
- Jim Weir
- Billy Bunter
