= Barry Smith (footballer, born 1974) =

Scottish footballer (born 1974)

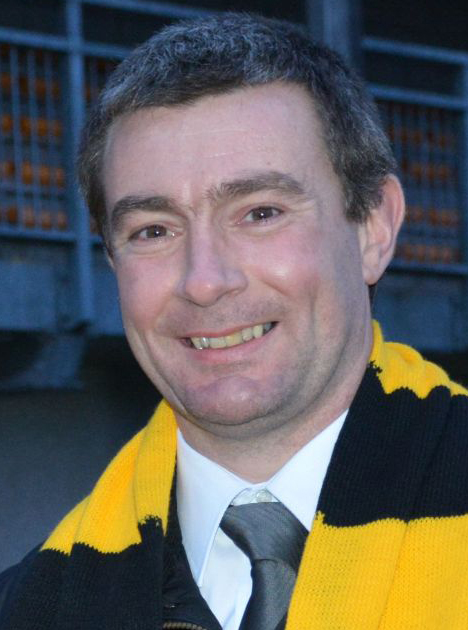
- Smith with Alloa Athletic in 2014

Personal information
- Full name: Barry Martin Smith
- Date of birth: 19 February 1974 (age 52)
- Place of birth: Paisley, Scotland
- Position: Defender

Senior career*
Years	Team	Apps	(Gls)
1991–1995	Celtic	19	(0)
1995–2006	Dundee	368	(4)
2006–2008	Valur	41	(1)
2007	→ Partick Thistle (loan)	12	(1)
2008	→ Greenock Morton (loan)	5	(0)
2009–2010	Dundee	0	(0)
2009–2010	→ Brechin City (loan)	53	(0)
2019	Brechin City	0	(0)
Total		499	(6)

International career
1992	Scotland U21	5	(0)

Managerial career
- 2010–2013: Dundee
- 2014–2015: Alloa Athletic
- 2015–2016: Aldershot Town
- 2016–2017: East Fife
- 2017–2018: Raith Rovers
- 2018–2019: Brechin City
- 2021: Pittsburgh City United
- 2023: Elgin City
- * Club domestic league appearances and goals

Barry Smith (born 19 February 1974) is a Scottish football coach and former player, who was most recently the manager of Scottish League Two club Elgin City. As a player, Smith played in the right back, centre back, and defensive midfielder roles for Celtic, Dundee, Valur, Partick Thistle, Greenock Morton and Brechin City. Smith was admitted into Dundee's Hall of Fame having made 400 appearances for the club.

Smith played on loan for Brechin City while managing the Dundee under-19 side. He became Dundee first team manager in October 2010, when the club had entered financial administration. During this period, Smith led the team to a club record 23-game unbeaten streak in the league. He has since managed Alloa Athletic, Aldershot Town, East Fife, Raith Rovers, Brechin City and Elgin City.

== Club career ==
=== Celtic ===
Smith began his career with Scottish Premier League side Celtic. He made his début aged 17 and played 22 games, including two Old Firm matches, between 1991 and 1995.

=== Dundee ===
Smith never gained a regular place at Celtic Park and joined fellow Scottish side Dundee in December 1995. He quickly established himself in the team at right-back and was made club captain in 1997, the same year Dundee achieved promotion to the Premier Division. After playing with the Dens Park side for ten-and-a-half seasons, Smith reached his testimonial year. He also took on the role of joint caretaker manager (with Bobby Mann) for the final two games of the 2005–06 season following the dismissal of Alan Kernaghan.

=== Valur ===
At the end of the 2005–06 season, Smith transferred to Icelandic outfit Valur, helping them to third place (in 2006) and winning (in 2007) the Icelandic Premier Division, their first championship in 20 years.

=== Partick Thistle and Greenock Morton ===
During the Icelandic close season, Smith was loaned back to Scottish clubs. In January 2007, he joined Partick Thistle, making 18 appearances and scoring one goal, while in January 2008 he joined Greenock Morton, making 5 appearances until he underwent a cartilage operation which kept him out for the rest of the season.

=== Return to Dundee ===
On 4 November 2008, Smith returned to Dundee as U19 coach, with his registration as a player following in January, whereupon he was loaned out to neighbours Brechin City, with the ability to be recalled at any time. Brechin City's status as a part-time team enabled Smith to continue in his role as U19 Coach at Dens Park.

== Coaching career ==
=== Dundee ===
On 15 October 2010, Smith was appointed manager of Dundee. He succeeded Gordon Chisholm, who had been made redundant after the club entered administration. Smith led the team to a club record unbeaten league streak of 23 games, guiding Dundee to safety despite the team receiving a 25-point deduction for entering administration for the second time in seven years (confirmed after a 0–1 win away to Ross County). This was rewarded, on 10 May 2011, when Smith signed a new three-year deal at Dundee, contracting him as manager until the end of the 2013–14 season.

Despite finishing second in the 2011–12 Scottish First Division, Dundee were admitted to the Scottish Premier League due to the liquidation of Rangers. Dundee struggled in the early part of the 2012–13 Scottish Premier League, winning three out of 22 matches. Despite this, the Dundee board restated their backing for Smith, citing the difficulty in adjusting to the SPL in unusual circumstances. However, just 47 days later, Smith and Dundee parted company. His sacking was criticised by St Johnstone manager Steve Lomas, believing Smith deserved another chance.

=== Alloa ===
On 1 July 2013, Smith joined Ross County as the club's Under-20s coach. In January 2014, Smith was appointed manager of Scottish Championship club Alloa Athletic. He guided Alloa to the final of the 2014–15 Scottish Challenge Cup. Alloa defeated Rangers in the semi-final, with Smith noting the fact he had become the first Alloa manager to win a match against Rangers. Smith said in December 2014 that he hoped to return to a full-time management job. After a run of one win in 13 matches, he resigned as Alloa manager in March 2015.

=== Aldershot ===
On 27 April 2015, Aldershot Town appointed Barry Smith as their manager. He resigned a year later due to family issues.

=== East Fife ===
Smith was appointed manager of Scottish League One club East Fife in December 2016. He left the club on 30 May 2017.

=== Raith Rovers ===
After leaving East Fife, Smith took over as manager of recently relegated Scottish League One side Raith Rovers on 30 May 2017. Rovers finished second in 2017–18 Scottish League One, narrowly missing out on automatic promotion and then losing in the playoffs to Alloa. Smith resigned from his position on 4 September 2018, with the team sitting in second place.

=== Brechin City ===
Smith was appointed Brechin City manager in November 2018.

On 13 July 2019, Smith was forced to play himself in a League Cup game against Forfar Athletic due to a shortage of players, nine years after retiring from playing. Smith left Brechin on 19 August 2019, after they had lost their first three matches of the 2019–20 Scottish League Two season.

=== Forfar and Dundee return ===
Smith was made assistant manager for Forfar Athletic underneath manager Jim Weir in October 2019. During Smith's short tenure with the Loons, Weir was recovering from a car crash, and eventually had to resign due to complications caused by the crash. As part of a new change in management, Smith left Forfar shortly after. Smith made his return to Dundee a couple of weeks later, taking up a role in the club's academy headed by Gordon Strachan and Stephen Wright.

=== Dumbarton ===
Smith was appointed Jim Duffy's assistant at Scottish League One side Dumbarton in January 2020 after the departure of Craig McPherson.

=== York United ===
On 23 February 2022, Smith joined Canadian Premier League side York United as an assistant coach under former Canadian international Martin Nash.

=== Elgin City ===
Smith was appointed manager of Scottish League Two club Elgin City in September 2023. He left the club two months later due to increased work commitments in another employment.

== Managerial statistics ==
As of 11 November 2023

Team	From	To	Record				
Team	From	To	G	W	D	L	Win %
Dundee	15 October 2010	20 February 2013	102	39	27	36	38.24
Alloa Athletic	20 January 2014	7 March 2015	54	13	10	31	24.07
Aldershot Town	27 April 2015	30 April 2016	50	17	9	24	34.00
East Fife	12 December 2016	30 May 2017	23	9	6	8	39.13
Raith Rovers	30 May 2017	4 September 2018	56	31	12	13	55.36
Brechin City	7 November 2018	19 August 2019	33	6	6	21	18.18
Elgin City	6 September 2023	13 November 2023	8	2	1	5	25.00
Total			326	117	71	138	35.89

== Honours ==
=== Player ===
Dundee

- Scottish First Division: Champions 1997–98

Valur

- Icelandic Premier Division : Champions 2007

=== Manager ===
Dundee

- Scottish First Division: promotion 2011–12
