= Dylan Bikey =

French footballer (born 1995)

Dylan Nguene Bikey
Personal information
- Full name: Dylan Julien Nguene Bikey
- Date of birth: 18 February 1995 (age 31)
- Place of birth: Nantes, France
- Height: 1.80 m (5 ft 11 in)
- Position: Forward

Youth career
- 2005–2012: Nantes

Senior career*
Years	Team	Apps	(Gls)
2013–2014	Nantes	0	(0)
2014–2015	Nantes B	7	(0)
2015–2016	Dieppe	4	(2)
2016–2017	Stirling Albion	7	(6)
2017	Heart of Midlothian	2	(0)
2017	→ Stirling Albion (loan)	6	(1)
2017–2019	Doxa Katokopias	6	(0)
2018–2019	→ Drancy (loan)	5	(0)
2019–2022	Stirling Albion	41	(7)
- * Club domestic league appearances and goals as of 21:33, 11 January 2022 (UTC)

Dylan Nguene Bikey (born 18 February 1995) is a French professional footballer who plays as a striker or winger. He has previously played for Nantes, Dieppe, Stirling Albion, Heart of Midlothian, Doxa Katokopias and Drancy.

== Career ==
In August 2013, Bikey signed a two-year contract with Nantes, after being the subject of interest from English club Everton.

On 25 November 2016, Scottish League Two club Stirling Albion signed Bikey on an amateur contract. During his time at the club, Bikey scored nine goals in nine games in all competitions.

On 27 January 2017, Bikey signed for Heart of Midlothian after leaving Stirling Albion a day prior. Bikey had been training at city rivals Hibernian ahead of a possible transfer. Hearts signed Bikey on amateur forms to avoid paying a compensation fee to Dieppe, one of his former clubs. After two months with Hearts, Bikey returned to Forthbank, joining Stirling Albion on loan until the end of the season. After just four months with Hearts, Bikey was released from the club at the end of his contract in May 2017.

After three months without a club, Bikey signed for Cypriot First Division side Doxa Katokopias in August 2017.

After spending time on loan at Drancy, Bikey signed for Stirling Albion for a third time in August 2019, agreeing a contract until the end of the 2019–20 season. On 11 January 2022, Bikey was released from his contract at Stirling Albion for personal reasons.

== Personal life ==
Born in France, Bikey is of Cameroonian and Ivorian descent.

== Career statistics ==
As of match played 8 February 2020

Appearances and goals by club, season and competition
Club	Season	League			National cup		League cup		Other		Total	
Club	Season	Division	Apps	Goals	Apps	Goals	Apps	Goals	Apps	Goals	Apps	Goals
Nantes B	2014–15	CFA	7	0	—		—		—		7	0
Dieppe	2015–16	CFA	4	2	0	0	0	0	—		4	2
Stirling Albion	2016–17	Scottish League Two	7	6	2	3	0	0	0	0	9	9
Heart of Midlothian	2016–17	Scottish Premiership	2	0	0	0	0	0	0	0	2	0
Stirling Albion (loan)	2016–17	Scottish League Two	6	1	0	0	0	0	0	0	6	1
Doxa Katokopias	2017–18	Cypriot First Division	6	0	2	0	—		—		8	0
Doxa Katokopias	2018–19	Cypriot First Division	0	0	0	0	—		—		0	0
Doxa Katokopias	Total		6	0	2	0	0	0	0	0	8	0
JA Drancy (loan)	2018–19	Championnat National	5	0	1	0	—		—		6	0
Stirling Albion	2019–20	Scottish League Two	14	2	1	0	0	0	1 (Note: Appearance in the Scottish Challenge Cup)	0	16	2
Career total			51	11	6	3	0	0	1	0	58	13
