= Edinburgh City F.C. =

Association football club based in Edinburgh, Scotland

Edinburgh City
- Full name: Edinburgh City Football Club
- Nickname: The Citizens
- Short name: City
- Founded: 1966; 60 years ago as Postal United F.C. 1986; 40 years ago as Edinburgh City F.C.
- Ground: Meadowbank Stadium, Edinburgh
- Capacity: 1,280 (500 seated)
- Coordinates: 55.957046°N 3.158572°W
- Chairman: John Dickson
- Manager: Michael McIndoe
- League: Scottish League Two
- 2025–26: Scottish League Two, 10th of 10
- Website: edinburghcityfc.com
Home colours	Away colours

Edinburgh City Football Club is a semi-professional senior Scottish football club which plays in Scottish League Two, the fourth tier of the Scottish Professional Football League. The club play at Meadowbank Stadium.

A club known as Edinburgh City was first formed in 1928. It participated in the Scottish Football League in the 1930s and 1940s, but ceased fielding a football team in the 1950s continuing as a social club only. The present club received consent from the original business to adopt the Edinburgh City name in 1986. It applied to join the Scottish Football League in 2002 and 2008 but failed to win election on both occasions with Gretna and Annan Athletic being favoured at the time. Edinburgh City became members of the new Lowland League in 2013 and went on to win the Lowland League championship in 2015 and 2016, and won promotion to Scottish Professional Football League in 2016. In 2022, Edinburgh City were promoted to Scottish League One for the first time in the club's history after winning 3–2 in the play-off final against Annan Athletic.

== History ==
=== Foundation and early history (1928–2016) ===
The original Edinburgh City was founded in 1928 and the club adopted amateur status, with the aim of becoming the Edinburgh equivalent of Glasgow club Queen's Park. Edinburgh City joined the Scottish Football League in 1931. The club played in the Lothian Amateur League during the Second World War and were only admitted to the C Division in 1946; by then the club had adopted professional status. After three more years of struggle, the club left the Scottish Football League in 1949. It switched to junior status and played in the Edinburgh & District Junior League. The club ceased activity completely in 1955 when the local council refused to renew its lease on its home ground, City Park.

A club called Postal United F.C. was founded in 1966 and joined the East of Scotland League. Their best league finish was third in 1985–86, having won the Qualifying Cup in 1982–83 and King Cup in 1984–85.

The Edinburgh City Football Club Ltd continued trading as a social club and Alan Day, who was a player with Postal United and also a member of the social club, approached the board to adopt their name. Approval was then granted in 1986 for Postal United to become Edinburgh City F.C..

Edinburgh City has participated in the Scottish Cup since the mid-1990s, when it became a full member of the Scottish Football Association. In the 1997–98 Scottish Cup they defeated SFL club East Stirlingshire, before losing 7–2 to Dunfermline Athletic, then of the Premier Division.

The club applied to join the Scottish Football League in 2002 after Airdrieonians had gone bankrupt, but Gretna won the vote instead. Edinburgh City applied again following Gretna's liquidation in 2008, but this time lost out to Annan Athletic.

Edinburgh City won the East of Scotland Football League Premier Division title for the first time in the 2005–06 season and became members of the new Lowland League in 2013. They went on to win the Lowland League title in 2014–15 and 2015–16 under the management of Gary Jardine. They then gained promotion to the Scottish Professional Football League by defeating East Stirlingshire in the play-offs with a penalty four minutes from time, converted by Dougie Gair.

=== Promotion to SPFL (2016–2022) ===
The victory over East Stirling meant it was the first time a non-league club had been promoted to the professional league using the newly established pyramid system below the SPFL.

Edinburgh City finished in seventh place during their first Scottish League Two season in 2016–17. Ross Allum scored City's first ever goal as an SPFL club in a cup defeat to Hamilton Academical at Meadowbank. Their first SPFL league goal was scored by Craig Beattie.

Under James McDonaugh they avoided the relegation play-offs in 2018, finishing eight points ahead of bottom placed Cowdenbeath. They fared better in 2018–19 following investment from Tom Tracy, finishing third and qualifying for the League One promotion play-offs. However, they were knocked out by Clyde in the play-off semi-finals, losing 4–0 over two legs.

Edinburgh City sat second in the table after 27 games when the truncated 2019–20 season was brought to an early finish in April 2020. In the 2020–21 Scottish League Two season, a limited number of fixtures were played due to the COVID-19 pandemic. City again found themselves in the play-offs after a second place league finish on goal difference. In the play-off final against League One opponents Dumbarton, City would experience play-off disappointment again, losing 3–2 on aggregate.

Finally, after finishing 4th in the 2021–22 season following the appointment of Alan Maybury, Edinburgh City navigated the League One play-offs and earned promotion to Scottish League One after victory against Annan Athletic. It meant the club would play in the 3rd tier of Scottish football for the first time in its history. They won the tie on aggregate 3–2 with Innes Murray scoring the winner.

=== League One, 'FC Edinburgh' and financial troubles (2022–2024) ===
Within weeks of Edinburgh City's successful promotion, club owner Tom Tracy and the board changed their name to FC Edinburgh in June 2022. They no longer felt the 1986 permission from the Edinburgh City social club to use the name was sufficient, and wished to own the club name outright.

When the social club refused to surrender the name, Edinburgh City became "Football Club of Edinburgh". The change was made with no prior consultation with supporters and was a deeply unpopular decision. The club clarified in October 2022 that it should be known as Edinburgh, rather than the full name of 'FC Edinburgh', in an attempt to ease frustration. The club would go on to finish a respectable 6th place in League One despite the off pitch turmoil.

City also faced criticism throughout the 2022–23 season following their move back to the redeveloped Meadowbank which was designed as a multi-purpose stadium favouring track and field facilities. This hindered the view for supporters due to the distance the main stand was from the pitch and lack of elevation.

In June 2023 it was announced that ownership would be transferred from Tom Tracy to a fan based consortium led by John Dickson. It was also announced the club would revert to being Edinburgh City pending SFA approval. With the supporters playing their part in influencing the SFA decision, in June 2023 approval was confirmed.

Due to limited time and resources available following the takeover, Edinburgh City would endure a challenging 2023–24 campaign and would encounter financial difficulties midway through the season. Michael McIndoe was appointed head coach following the departure of Alan Maybury. However, the club were soon penalised six points for failing to pay their players on time and many moved on as a consequence. This left a squad made up of youth players and loan signings to play out the remainder of the season. City were relegated back to League Two after a 5–2 defeat to Alloa Athletic on 16 March 2024.

=== League Two, licensing issues and insolvency event (2024–present) ===
Following City's relegation back to League Two, the club faced more off-field challenges. This time the issue was obtaining its 'bronze licence' due to new and more strict SFA criteria with additional mandatory requirements. This led to intense speculation the club may lose its SPFL status altogether for the season ahead.

On 29 June 2024, Edinburgh City were granted the required licence and subsequently announced the signing of 16 players for the new season within the space of three days on a very limited budget. City were immediately installed as favourites to be relegated from the SPFL and back to the Lowland League.

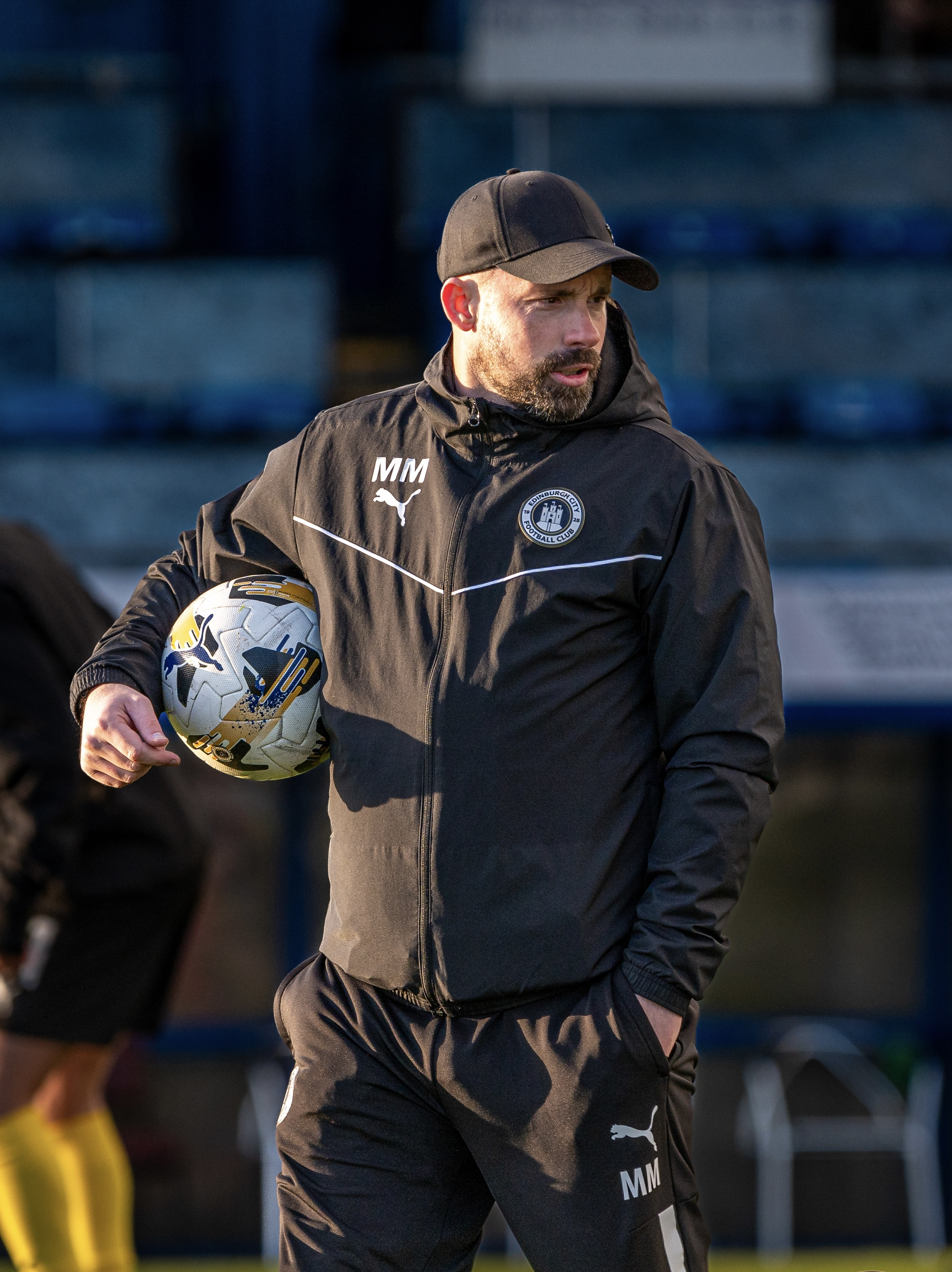
Michael McIndoe took over as City boss in October 2023.

However, the club went on to have an impressive season with a focus on attacking football. City finished third in the 2024–25 season which exceeded expectations and gave them the opportunity to bounce straight back to League One via the play-offs. However they fell short against East Fife with a 3–1 aggregate loss which confirmed League Two football again for the 2025–26 season.

Shortly after the start of the 2025–26 season, the SPFL announced a fifteen-point deduction against Edinburgh City due to the club suffering an insolvency event. This was due to the appointment of a provisional liquidator in a winding up order. The club confirmed it would appeal against the deduction as the appointment was quickly terminated with the petitioning debt being paid in full. However, the SPFL rejected the appeal and the -15 deduction stood, as well as a -5 penalty for the following season.

Within two months of the -15 deduction, City had clawed back the points. However, following a poor run of form thereafter, McIndoe made many changes to his squad in January. Results did not improve, and following a 2–0 loss at home to Clyde on 11 April 2026, City were confirmed as 'Club 42'. This meant they would face Highland League Champions, Brora Rangers to retain their SPFL place. City overcame Brora, winning the tie 3–1 on aggregate to retain their SPFL status for the 2026–27 season.

City started the 2026–27 season with a 5 point deduction following the financial issues the previous season.

== Badge and colours ==
The club crest has always contained a castle in reference to the historic Edinburgh Castle in the City centre. There have been four iterations of the club crest during their time in the SPFL.

The club colours are white shirts and black shorts, although there have been variations. There have been previous seasons where City have played in all white, although most associated with the club prefer the traditional black shorts to be included.

Postal United F.C. played in all-red, but switched to the traditional black and white colours of Edinburgh City when it adopted the City identity in 1986. From 2019 to 2022, the club wore a red and black striped "Heritage Kit" which paid tribute to the original colours of Postal United.

In recent seasons, the club has adopted all black as an alternative and launched an all black limited edition strip trimmed with gold for the 2024–25 season.

== Stadium ==
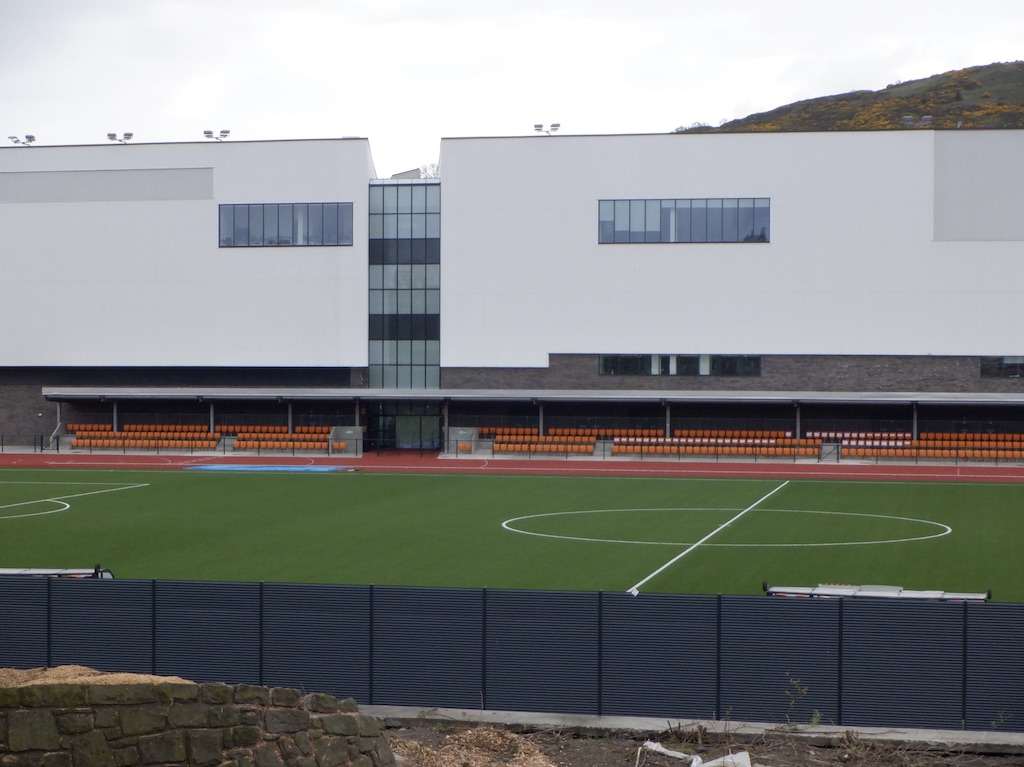
The re-developed Meadowbank Stadium. City moved back here in 2022.

Edinburgh City have played at several grounds throughout their history and currently play their home fixtures at Meadowbank Stadium.

The original club played its home matches at Powderhall Stadium and City Park during its time in the Scottish Football League.

The present club initially played their home fixtures at the Saughton Enclosure, before switching to Paties Road, where Edinburgh United currently play.

Edinburgh City moved on to City Park and then Fernieside. Eventually they moved to Meadowbank Stadium, which had been vacated by the move of Meadowbank Thistle to Livingston in 1996. The club gained some additional supporters at this time due to many Meadowbank Thistle fans opting to support a local team instead of the relocated club.

In February 2013, the City of Edinburgh Council started a new consultation process about the future of Meadowbank Stadium. Three options for redeveloping Meadowbank were put forward for consideration by Edinburgh Council in December 2013. A planned design was made public in November 2016 and work began after the 2016–17 season ended.

Edinburgh City reached an agreement with Spartans to use their Ainslie Park ground for three seasons while Meadowbank was redeveloped. The club announced in March 2021 that they would return to Meadowbank for the 2021–22 season, with the ground now having a 4G artificial playing surface and a 500-seat stand. Due to construction delays because of the COVID-19 pandemic, the club remained at Ainslie Park for the 2021–22 season.

City eventually returned to the re-developed Meadowbank Stadium in July 2022 in a League Cup match against Arbroath.

== Rivalry ==
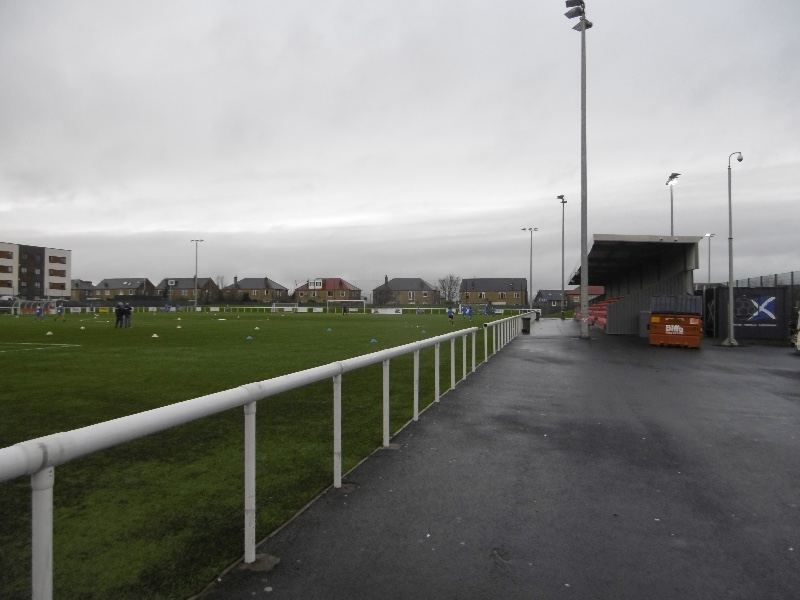
Ainslie Park, the home of Spartans, Edinburgh City played home games here from 2017 to 2022

In the 1990s Edinburgh City supporters regarded Whitehill Welfare as their closest rivals. The games were always competitive and not without incident. However the sides have rarely met in recent years due to being at different levels within the pyramid system.

Edinburgh City's main rivals are north Edinburgh club, Spartans. The two sides compete in the Edinburgh derby which became closely contested during their time in the East of Scotland Football League and continued following the formation of the Lowland League in 2013. When City won the 2015–16 Lowland Football League and gained promotion, Spartans finished runners-up.

Between 2017 and 2022, Edinburgh City became tenants of Spartans at Ainslie Park following the re-development of Meadowbank Stadium. Some tensions began to surface between the clubs during this period.

After Edinburgh City's change of ownership in June 2023, previous owner Tom Tracy claimed a proposed merger was close to being agreed between the clubs which would see the merged entity play at Ainslie Park. This increased tensions further with comparisons being drawn to Spartans attempt to buy Cowdenbeath's shareholding in 2010 to try and gain SFL entry.

With Spartans gaining promotion from the Lowland League, and a subsequent relegation for City to follow, the derby was revived for the 2024–25 season. Edinburgh City won the first ever SPFL meeting between the sides 2–0 at Meadowbank Stadium in October 2024, with a Connor Young brace sealing the win.

Edinburgh City also recorded the first away SPFL derby win at Ainslie Park, 1–0 in October 2025, following a second half goal scored by Jack Duncan.

== First-team squad ==
As of 1 July 2026

Note: Flags indicate national team as defined under FIFA eligibility rules; some limited exceptions apply. Players may hold more than one non-FIFA nationality.

No.	Pos.	Nation	Player
1	GK	SCO	Mark Weir
2	DF	SCO	Chris McGinn
3	DF	SCO	Jamie Walker
4	DF	SCO	Callum Pitt
5	DF	SCO	Josh Grigor
6	MF	SCO	Jack Leitch
7	FW	SCO	Lennon Walker
8	FW	SCO	Robbie Leitch
9	FW	SCO	Cameron McKinley
10	MF	SCO	Jason Jarvis
11	MF	SCO	Innes Lawson
14	DF	SCO	Ricky Waugh

No.	Pos.	Nation	Player
15	MF	SCO	Callum Brodie
16	DF	SCO	Greig Allen
17	FW	SCO	Casey Bunker
18	MF	SCO	Murray Aiken
19	MF	SCO	Stanley Wilson (co-operation loan with Hearts)
20	FW	SCO	Tommy North (co-operation loan with Hearts)
21	MF	SCO	Freddie Rowe (on loan from Dunfermline Athletic)
22	GK	SCO	Shea Dowie
23	DF	SCO	Jordan McGregor (captain)
24	FW	SCO	Keir Foster
25	DF	SCO	Euan Glasgow (co-operation loan with Hearts)

== Coaching staff ==
Position	Name
Manager	(Scotland) Michael McIndoe
Assistant manager Head of youth development	(Scotland) Kirk Crichton
Goalkeeping coach	(Scotland) Sean Coyle
Physiotherapist	(England) Zara Kara
U20 head coach	(Scotland) Andrew Jamieson

== Managerial history (SPFL era) ==
Key

- M = matches played; W = matches won; D = matches drawn; L = matches lost; Win % = percentage of total matches won
- Competitions: SPFL league fixtures, play-offs, Scottish Cup, League Cup, Challenge Cup and East of Scotland Cup.

Name	From	To	M	W	D	L	Win %
(Scotland) Gary Jardine*	20/07/2016	30/09/2017	60	15	13	32	25.00
(Scotland) James McDonaugh	10/10/2017	07/03/2021	131	59	26	46	45.04
(Scotland) Gary Naysmith	09/03/2021	17/03/2022	55	25	12	18	45.45
(Republic of Ireland) Alan Maybury	24/03/2022	03/10/2023	67	21	12	34	31.34
(Scotland) Michael McIndoe	09/10/2023	Present	154	49	27	78	31.81

*Gary Jardine was manager from 2010 and gained promotion with the club to the SPFL in 2016

*Info updated as at 15/11/2026

== Hall of Fame ==
In 2024, Edinburgh City opened a Hall of Fame to honour those who have cemented their place as part of the club's history. Those inducted are:

- Alick Milne (Director and programme editor)
- James Lumsden (Former Chairman)
- Dougie Gair (Record Holder for Appearances, Goals Scored, Assists)
- Andy McDonald (former Director and Administrator) - Inducted 2025

== Notable players ==
Willie Bauld was sent on loan to Edinburgh City for the 1946–47 season from Heart of Midlothian. Bauld went on to cement himself as a Hearts legend in the years ahead and won three caps for Scotland.

Former Scotland internationalists Craig Beattie and Derek Riordan both played for Edinburgh City in the twilight of their careers. Riordan scored City's last goal at the old Meadowbank Stadium prior to its re-development, in a 1–0 over Stirling Albion on 29 April 2017.

Current Scotland international defender Ryan Porteous was loaned to the club at the start of his playing career from Hibernian for the 2016–17 season. His goal on 12 November 2016 against Annan Athletic gave Edinburgh City their first ever home league win in the SPFL.

== Honours ==
- Scottish League Two
  - Runners-up: 2019–20, 2020–21
- Lowland Football League
  - Winners (2): 2014–15, 2015–16
- East of Scotland Football League
  - Winners: 2005–06
  - Runners-up: 2003–04
- East of Scotland Football League First Division
  - Winners: 1995–96
  - Runners-up: 1989–90
- SFA South Region Challenge Cup
  - Runners-up: 2007–08, 2010–11, 2015–16
- East of Scotland League Cup
  - Winners (3): 1992–93, 2001–02, 2012–13
  - Runners-up: 2000–01, 2003–04, 2004–05, 2011–12
- King Cup
  - Winners (2): 1998–99, 1999–2000
  - Runners-up: 2004–05
