= Halbro =

Halbro Sportswear Limited is a British manufacturer of sportswear and equipment for both codes of Rugby.

The company was established in Wigan in 1919, but is now based in the town of Horwich, Greater Manchester. The name Halbro is a portmanteau of its two original founders, Hallet, a coal merchant, and Broughton, a sports retailer.

Clubs using Halbro jerseys include the RAF Rugby League Team and many northern rugby union clubs, and also at football in the Scottish League Two supplying Annan Athletic.
