= Jim Chapman (footballer) =

Scottish footballer and coach

Personal information
- Full name: James McMillan Chapman
- Date of birth: 26 July 1965 (age 61)
- Place of birth: Coatbridge, Scotland
- Position: Forward

Team information
- Current team: Kilmarnock Women (Manager)

Senior career*
Years	Team	Apps	(Gls)
- Thorniewood United
1986–1990	Albion Rovers	123	(31)
1990–1991	Dumbarton	11	(4)
Total		134	(35)

Managerial career
- 2001–2004: FC Kilmarnock Ladies
- 2005–2007: Albion Rovers
- 2007–2010: Dumbarton
- 2013–2017: Annan Athletic
- 2017: Clyde
- 2022–: Kilmarnock Women
- * Club domestic league appearances and goals

James McMillan Chapman (born 26 July 1965) is a Scottish football player and coach who is currently in his second spell as manager of Kilmarnock FC Women. Chapman played for Albion Rovers and Dumbarton as a forward. He has previously managed Annan Athletic, Albion Rovers, Dumbarton and Clyde.

== Player ==
Chapman played as a forward for Albion Rovers and Dumbarton. A knee injury ended his career aged 25.

== Manager ==
=== Kilmarnock Ladies ===
Chapman began his managerial career with a successful stint at Kilmarnock Ladies between 2001 and 2004. He won two Scottish Women's Premier League championships, 1 Scottish Women's Cup, 2 Scottish Women's Premier League Cup and 1 Scottish Women's Football League First Division Cup.

=== Albion Rovers ===
Chapman moved into men's football with Albion Rovers, but he was sacked in May 2007 after a dispute with the board.

=== Dumbarton ===
Chapman was then appointed Dumbarton manager in December 2007. He led the Sons to the Scottish Third Division championship and promotion the following season. Chapman resigned as Dumbarton manager in October 2010, with the team struggling in the Second Division and took a football development role with the club.

=== Annan Athletic ===
He was appointed manager of Third Division club Annan Athletic in January 2013. Chapman won his first game on his eighth attempt with a shock 2–1 win over Rangers at Ibrox on Saturday 9 March 2013. Almost three years later in January 2016, he led the club to a Scottish Cup shock win over Scottish Premiership side Hamilton Academical with an emphatic 4–1 home win.

=== Clyde ===
On 20 May 2017, after over four years with Annan Athletic, Chapman left the club to manager fellow Scottish League Two side Clyde. Chapman left Clyde on 31 October 2017, with the club saying that "league results, performances and overall standards" had fallen short of their expectations.

== Managerial statistics ==
As of match played 28 October 2017

Team	From	To	Record				
Team	From	To	G	W	D	L	Win %
Kilmarnock Ladies	2001	2004					
Albion Rovers	2005	2007					
Dumbarton	2007	2010	126	40	40	46	31.75
Annan Athletic	2013	2017	193	82	37	74	42.49
Clyde	2017	2017	16	5	2	9	31.25
Total			335	127	79	129	37.91

- No statistics available for Kilmarnock Ladies or Albion Rovers.

== Honours and achievements ==
Kilmarnock Ladies

- Scottish Women's Premier League (2): 2001–02, 2002–03
- Scottish Women's Cup: 2001–02
- Scottish Women's Premier League Cup (2): 2002–03, 2003–04
- Scottish Women's Football League First Division Cup: 2001–02

Dumbarton

- Scottish Third Division: 2008–09
- Stirlingshire Cup: 2009-10
