= Mitch Megginson =

Scottish footballer

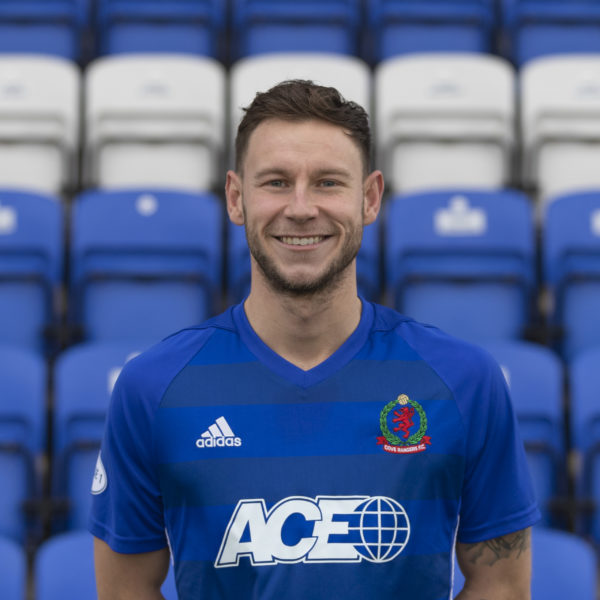

Personal information
- Full name: Mitchel William Megginson
- Date of birth: 27 July 1992 (age 34)
- Place of birth: Aberdeen, Scotland
- Position: Striker

Senior career*
| Years | Team | Apps | (Gls) |
| 2009–2013 | Aberdeen | 27 | (0) |
| 2010 | → Arbroath (loan) | 5 | (3) |
| 2011 | → Brechin City (loan) | 11 | (3) |
| 2012–2013 | → Alloa Athletic (loan) | 14 | (3) |
| 2013–2015 | Dumbarton | 72 | (17) |
| 2015–2016 | Raith Rovers | 17 | (1) |
| 2016 | Alloa Athletic | 15 | (1) |
| 2016–2026 | Cove Rangers | 214 | (129) |
| 2026– | Peterhead | 0 | (0) |

International career
| 2009 | Scotland U17 | 6 | (3) |
| 2010 | Scotland U19 | 1 | (1) |
- * Club domestic league appearances and goals as of 5 March 2025 (UTC)

Mitch Megginson (born 27 July 1992) is a Scottish footballer who plays as a striker for Scottish League One club Peterhead.

== Club career ==
Megginson made his debut for Aberdeen in August 2009, playing against Czech Republic opponents Sigma Olomouc in the Europa League.

In April 2010, Megginson joined Second Division club Arbroath on loan until the end of the season. In all he played nine games, scoring four goals for the club in all competitions.

In March 2011, Megginson joined Brechin City on a one-month emergency loan deal. He was again loaned in October 2012, to Alloa Athletic on an emergency loan deal. This was then extended in January 2013 until the end of the season. It was announced on 13 May 2013 that Megginson's contract along with another six players would not be extended.

On 28 June 2013, it was announced that Megginson had signed for Dumbarton on a one-year contract.

On 21 June 2014, Mitch signed a new one-year deal with 'The Sons'. He left the club in May 2015 having featured in every game since joining the team. In total he made 83 appearances for the club, scoring 16 times.

On 5 June 2015, Mitch signed for Scottish Championship side Raith Rovers.

On 27 January 2016, he left Rovers for rival Scottish Championship side Alloa Athletic.

=== Cove Rangers ===
In June 2016, Megginson signed a three-year contract with Highland League champions Cove Rangers, a team for whom his father Mike had played in the 1990s and early 2000s. He has scored nearly 250 goals for Cove Rangers and has been a part of three title winning squads. In June 2026, Megginson departed the club after rejecting a new contract. Megginson was awarded a testimonial year in January 2026, and had his testimonial match on 12 July 2026 where he captained a team of Cove Rangers Legends in a 6-3 defeat to Aberdeen Legends, he scored Cove's third goal.

== International career ==
Megginson won six caps and has scored three goals for the Scotland under-17 team. He also won one cap and scored one goal for the under-19 team.

== Career statistics ==
Appearances and goals by club, season and competition
| Club | Season | League | | | Scottish Cup | | League Cup | | Other | | Total | |
| Club | Season | Division | Apps | Goals | Apps | Goals | Apps | Goals | Apps | Goals | Apps | Goals |
|---|---|---|---|---|---|---|---|---|---|---|---|---|
| Aberdeen | 2009–10 | Scottish Premier League | 2 | 0 | 0 | 0 | 0 | 0 | 1 | 0 | 3 | 0 |
| Aberdeen | 2010–11 | Scottish Premier League | 6 | 0 | 0 | 0 | 2 | 0 | 0 | 0 | 8 | 0 |
| Aberdeen | 2011–12 | Scottish Premier League | 16 | 0 | 4 | 1 | 0 | 0 | 0 | 0 | 20 | 1 |
| Aberdeen | 2012–13 | Scottish Premier League | 3 | 0 | 0 | 0 | 0 | 0 | 0 | 0 | 3 | 0 |
| Aberdeen | Total | | 27 | 0 | 4 | 1 | 2 | 0 | 1 | 0 | 34 | 1 |
| Arbroath (loan) | 2009–10 | Scottish Second Division | 5 | 3 | 0 | 0 | 0 | 0 | 4 | 1 | 9 | 4 |
| Brechin City (loan) | 2010–11 | Scottish Second Division | 13 | 2 | 0 | 0 | 0 | 0 | 4 | 1 | 17 | 3 |
| Alloa Athletic (loan) | 2012–13 | Scottish Second Division | 12 | 3 | 0 | 0 | 0 | 0 | 0 | 0 | 12 | 3 |
| Dumbarton | 2013–14 | Scottish Championship | 36 | 10 | 4 | 1 | 2 | 1 | 1 | 0 | 43 | 12 |
| Dumbarton | 2014–15 | Scottish Championship | 36 | 3 | 1 | 0 | 2 | 1 | 1 | 0 | 40 | 4 |
| Dumbarton | Total | | 72 | 13 | 5 | 1 | 4 | 2 | 2 | 0 | 83 | 16 |
| Raith Rovers | 2015–16 | Scottish Championship | 16 | 1 | 1 | 0 | 3 | 0 | 1 | 0 | 21 | 1 |
| Alloa Athletic | 2015–16 | Scottish Championship | 15 | 1 | 0 | 0 | 0 | 0 | 0 | 0 | 15 | 1 |
| Cove Rangers | 2016–17 | Highland League | — | — | 1 | 0 | 4 | 1 | — | — | — | 29 |
| Cove Rangers | 2017–18 | Highland League | — | — | 4 | 3 | 0 | 0 | — | — | — | 52 |
| Cove Rangers | 2018–19 | Highland League | 30 | 36 | 2 | 2 | 3 | 0 | — | — | — | 49 |
| Cove Rangers | 2019–20 | Scottish League Two | 25 | 24 | 1 | 0 | 2 | 2 | 1 | 0 | 31 | 27 |
| Cove Rangers | 2020–21 | Scottish League One | 19 | 14 | 2 | 0 | 3 | 0 | 2 | 1 | 26 | 15 |
| Cove Rangers | 2021–22 | Scottish League One | 33 | 18 | 3 | 2 | 4 | 2 | 4 | 2 | 44 | 24 |
| Cove Rangers | 2022–23 | Scottish Championship | 32 | 7 | 2 | 0 | 4 | 1 | 1 | 0 | 39 | 8 |
| Cove Rangers | 2023–24 | Scottish League One | 25 | 10 | 2 | 2 | 2 | 1 | 1 | 0 | 30 | 13 |
| Cove Rangers | 2024–25 | Scottish League One | 27 | 13 | 3 | 0 | 0 | 0 | 5 | 2 | 35 | 15 |
| Cove Rangers | 2025–26 | Scottish League One | 30 | 12 | 2 | 2 | 4 | 2 | 3 | 1 | 39 | 17 |
| Cove Rangers | Total | | 214 | 129 | 22 | 11 | 26 | 9 | 17 | 4 | 382 | 249 |
| Career total | | | 380 | 156 | 31 | 12 | 35 | 13 | 27 | 6 | 573 | 278 |

== Honours ==
=== Club ===
Cove Rangers

- Highland League (2): 2017–18, 2018–19
- Scottish League Two: 2019–20
- Scottish League One: 2021–22

=== Individual ===
- Scottish League One top goalscorer (3): 2020–21, 2021–22, 2024-25
- Scottish League Two top goalscorer: 2019–20
- Scottish League One Player of the Month (2): October 2024, November 2021
- Scottish League Two Player of the Month: January 2020
- SPFL Top goalscorer: 2019-20 (shared with Lawrence Shankland)
