= Elgin City F.C. =

Association football club in Scotland

Elgin City
- Full name: Elgin City Football Club
- Nicknames: The Black and Whites
- Short name: City
- Founded: 1893; 133 years ago
- Ground: Borough Briggs, Elgin
- Capacity: 4,520 (478 seated)
- Coordinates: 57.651825°N 3.320802°W
- Chairman: Alan Murray
- Manager: Stefan Laird
- League: Scottish League Two
- 2025–26: Scottish League Two, 6th of 10
- Website: www.elgincity.net
Home colours	Away colours

Elgin City Football Club (also known as City or The Black and Whites) is a professional senior football club based in Elgin, Moray.

Elgin was founded in 1893 and originally played their football in the Highland Football League. The club was granted league status in 2000. They currently compete in the Scottish Professional Football League in Scottish League Two.

== History ==
The present Elgin City club was formed on 10 August 1893 by the amalgamation of two Elgin sides, Rovers (Formed 1887) and Vale of Lossie (Founded 1888). However the name Elgin City was used by two clubs prior to this. The first was formed in October 1879, but lasted for only a short time. The second Elgin City was formed in October 1884 and lasted until early 1887.

The present club's first major honour came in the 1898–99 season when they became the first team outside Inverness to win the North of Scotland Cup, beating Clachnacuddin 2–1. However, they failed to record any more success aside from the Elgin District Cup until 1924 when they again won the North of Scotland Cup a second time. Since then they have won honours with relative frequency.

In 1968 the club reached the quarter-finals of the Scottish Cup, the furthest into the tournament that a Highland League club has ever progressed.

The club was granted league status in 2000 when the SPL was expanded to twelve clubs leaving two places to be filled. Peterhead joined them in the Third Division from the Highland League. Since joining the SFL, Elgin have struggled with consistency, and to this date have neither been promoted nor relegated, but in season 2003–04 they recaptured the North of Scotland Cup.

In December 2005, assistant manager Kenny Black saw a takeover bid thwarted at the eleventh hour. Many fans saw his bid as the best chance to move upward through the leagues, but a controversial sale of shares in the club meant Black's bid was defeated. David Robertson, manager at the time, also chose to leave the club. Former Lossiemouth manager Graham Tatters was subsequently named as Elgin's new chairman. Club captain at the time Jamie McKenzie was appointed caretaker manager and a run of good results was rewarded with the Manager of the Month award for December 2005; at the time he was the youngest serving manager in the UK.

Early in 2006, former Aberdeen, Ross County and Scotland international, Brian Irvine was appointed manager. However, following a very poor start to the 2006–07 season, he left the club despite having forged a good relationship with the fans.

After a brief spell under interim manager Graham Tatters (during which they lost to Highland League Deveronvale in the Scottish Cup Third round), former Clachnacuddin manager Robbie Williamson was appointed in January 2007. Williamson quit on 20 December 2008, before a game with Berwick Rangers. He left the team bottom of the Third Division after just two wins from 15 matches.

On 23 January 2009, former player of Everton, Norwich City, Dundee, Dunfermline Athletic and Kilmarnock, Ross Jack was named as the club's new manager, signing a three-and-a-half-year contract. He was a former player-manager of Montrose and former assistant coach at Ross County. On 5 January 2013, Elgin City became the first club to take a point from Rangers at Ibrox in the season, with the game finishing 1–1. Ross Jack left the club on 22 January 2014 after five years in charge, with the club lying in second bottom position of the division. In his time at the club, the high point was reaching the divisional play-offs at the end of season 2011–12.

Former player and assistant manager Barry Wilson was appointed as manager on 28 January 2014 and announced his intention to have a squad of north-based players. Barry Wilson resigned as manager on 17 November 2014 and was replaced by Jim Weir 10 days later. On 30 April 2016, they sealed the runners up spot in Scottish League Two and entered the promotion Play-offs. However, they lost 5–1 on aggregate to Clyde and remained in League Two. The club finished fifth in 2017, missing out on a play off spot by one point. 2018 saw another mid-table finish, as the club ended the campaign in sixth place on 49 points. In 2019, the club finished in eighth place, 24 points clear of the playoff spot.

== Ground ==
Elgin City have played at Borough Briggs since 1921 when it replaced Cooper Park. The ground currently has a capacity of 4,520 (478 seated) and is the most northerly football league ground in the United Kingdom.

== Kit history ==
Years	Kit Manufacturer	Kit Sponsor
1895–1986	Unknown	None
1986–1988	(England) Umbro	(Scotland) Bitoben
1989–1990	(England) Umbro	(Scotland) William Wilson Plumbing
1990–1991	Unknown	(Scotland) William Wilson Plumbing
1991–1992	GO Wear	Norco
1992–1993	Unknown	Sportscoup
1993–1994	Unknown	None
1994–1998	No Records	
1998–1999	(Germany) Uhlsport	(Scotland) Gordon Williamson
1999–2000	Prostar	(Scotland) Gordon Williamson
2000–2003	(Italy) Erreà	(Scotland) Gordon Williamson
2003–2005	(Italy) Erreà	(Scotland) John Fleming
2005–2006	(Italy) Erreà	(Scotland) Robertson Homes
2006–2007	(Italy) Diadora	(Scotland) Robertson Homes
2007–2008	(Denmark) Hummel	(Scotland) GSH
2008–2009	(Denmark) Hummel	(Scotland) H&R Insurance
2009–2010	(Denmark) Hummel	Unknown
2010–2011	(Denmark) Hummel	(Scotland) Edgar Road Properties
2011–2012	(Denmark) Hummel	(Scotland) Clark Thomson Insurance
2012–2013	(Denmark) Hummel	(Scotland) Robertson Homes
2013–2018	(Scotland) EC 1893 (own brand)	(Scotland) McDonald & Munro Ltd
2018–2020	(England) EV2 Sportswear	(Scotland) McDonald & Munro Ltd
2020–2026	(Spain) Joma	(Scotland) McDonald & Munro Ltd
2026–	(Germany) Adidas	(Scotland) McDonald & Munro Ltd

== First-team squad ==
As of 4 September 2026

Note: Flags indicate national team as defined under FIFA eligibility rules; some limited exceptions apply. Players may hold more than one non-FIFA nationality.

No.	Pos.	Nation	Player
1	GK	SCO	Tom Ritchie
2	DF	SCO	Morgyn Neill
3	DF	SCO	Evan Towler
4	MF	FIN	Miko Virtanen
5	DF	SCO	Kyle Girvan
6	DF	SCO	Jack Murray (vice-captain)
7	MF	SCO	Russell Dingwall (captain)
8	MF	SCO	Brian Cameron
9	FW	SCO	Kane Hester
10	MF	SCO	Mark Gallagher
11	FW	NZL	Oliver Colloty
12	DF	SCO	Owen Cairns

No.	Pos.	Nation	Player
16	MF	SCO	Lewis Hyde
17	MF	SCO	Kieron Willox
18	MF	SCO	Aaron Cummings (on loan from Aberdeen)
22	MF	SCO	Jack MacIver
23	DF	SCO	Matty Grant
24	MF	SCO	Lewis Mackay (co-operation loan with Ross County)
25	FW	SCO	Calum Brown (co-operation loan with Ross County)
26	DF	SCO	Lyall Booth
27	GK	SCO	Joe Morrison
30	MF	SCO	Daniel Fraser
40	DF	SCO	Darryl McHardy (on loan from Buckie Thistle)
77	MF	SCO	Liam Scullion

=== On loan ===
Note: Flags indicate national team as defined under FIFA eligibility rules; some limited exceptions apply. Players may hold more than one non-FIFA nationality.

No.	Pos.	Nation	Player
14	MF	BRA	Matheus Machado (on loan at Strathspey Thistle)
20	MF	SCO	Liam MacDonald (on loan at Buckie Thistle)

No.	Pos.	Nation	Player
21	GK	SCO	Cole Taylor (on loan at Rothes)
32	MF	SCO	Sam Rothnie (on loan at Buckie Thistle)

== Club officials ==
=== Board ===
- Chairman: Alan Murray
- Directors: Chris Foot, Stephen Hopes, Cecil Jack, Kenny Stewart

=== Staff ===
- Manager: Stefan Laird
- Assistant manager: Alex Thoirs
- First team coach: Connor Yeats
- Goalkeeping coach: Wayne Urquhart
- Performance analyst: John Walker
- Club doctor: Duff Bruce
- Physiotherapists: Andrew Jones, Catherine Graham
- Joint heads of youth academy: Darren Main, Steven Rattray

== Honours ==
- Highland League
  - Champions: 1931–32, 1934–35, 1952–53, 1955–56 (After Play-off), 1959–60, 1960–61 (After Play-off), 1962–63, 1964–65, 1965–66, 1967–68, 1968–69, 1969–70, 1973–74, 1989–90 (14)

Elgin City had won the 1992–93 season but were stripped of title for bringing forward their final match of the season, so that two players due to serve a suspension could play.

- Highland League Cup
  - Winners: 1959–60, 1966–67, 1982–83, 1990–91, 1997–98 (5)
- Scottish Qualifying Cup (North)
  - Winners: 1935–36, 1937–38, 1959–60, 1964–65, 1967–68, 1970–71, 1989–90 (7)
- North of Scotland Cup
  - Winners: 1898–99, 1923–24, 1936–37, 1954–55, 1955–56, 1960–61, 1961–62, 1967–68, 1968–69, 1970–71, 1972–73, 1975–76, 1982–83, 1988–89, 1989–90, 1997–98, 1998–99, 2003–04 (18)

== Club records ==
Win: 18–1 v Brora Rangers on 6 February 1960 (North of Scotland Cup)

Defeat: 1–14 v Heart of Midlothian on 4 February 1939 (1938–39 Scottish Cup)

Home attendance: 12,608 v Arbroath on 17 February 1968 (1967–68 Scottish Cup)

Away attendance: 46,406 v Rangers on 5 January 2013 (Scottish League, Third Division)

Most Scottish League Appearances: Brian Cameron 342 (39) (2008–)

Most Individual Goals in a Scottish League Match: 4 by Craig Gunn v Berwick Rangers, 6 August 2011 at Borough Briggs (Won 4–1)

Most Individual Goals in a Scottish Cup Match: 4 by Shane Sutherland v Hawick Royal Albert, 26 November 2016 at Borough Briggs (Won 8–1)

Most Scottish League Goals in a Season: Craig Gunn 21 (2015–16)

Most Scottish League Goals: Craig Gunn 114 (2009–2017)

Most Highland League Appearances: Neil MacLennan 438 (1979–1980, 1983–2000)

Most Individual Goals in a Highland League Match: 8 by Charlie Cormack v Nairn County, 29 August 1936 at Borough Briggs (Won 12–2)

Most Highland League Goals in a Season: Matt Armstrong 52 in 30 Appearances (1947–48)

Most Highland League Goals: Gerry Graham 259 in 257 Appearances (1965–1974)

Most Goals in a Season: Willie Grant 66 in 40 Appearances (1960–61)

Record Goalscorer: Gerry Graham (371) (1965–1974)

== Managers since entry to the SFL ==
Since 2000, Elgin have had 12 permanent managers:

- (Scotland) Alex Caldwell (24 February 2000 – 9 December 2002)
- (Scotland) David Robertson (2003 – 2 December 2005)
- (Scotland) Brian Irvine (26 January 2006 – December 2006)
- (Scotland) Robbie Williamson (11 January 2007 – 21 December 2008)
- (Scotland) Ross Jack (23 January 2009 – 22 January 2014)
- (Scotland) Barry Wilson (28 January 2014 – 17 November 2014)
- (Scotland) Jim Weir (27 November 2014 – 1 October 2017)
- (Scotland) Gavin Price (1 October 2017 – 8 April 2023)
- (England) Ross Draper (9 April 2023 – 5 September 2023)
- (Scotland) Barry Smith (6 September 2023 – 13 November 2023)
- (Scotland) Allan Hale (5 December 2023 – 11 May 2026)
- (Scotland) Stefan Laird (26 May 2026 – present)
