= Gavin Price =

Scottish footballer and coach

Personal information
- Date of birth: 29 January 1974 (age 52)
- Place of birth: Perth, Scotland
- Position: Forward

Youth career
- North Muirton U18s, Breadalbane U14s

Senior career*
Years	Team	Apps	(Gls)
1991–1992	Forfar Athletic	21	(1)
1992–1993	Kinnoull		
1993–1994	Meadowbank Thistle	15	(1)
1994–1995	Brechin City	24	(8)
1995–1997	ADO Den Haag	44	(17)
1997	St Johnstone	0	(0)
1997–1999	Stirling Albion	43	(9)
1999	Brechin City	6	(0)
1999–2000	Altrincham		
Total		153	(36)

Managerial career
- 2010–2013: Kinnoull
- 2013–2017: Jeanfield Swifts
- 2017–2023: Elgin City
- 2023–2024: Brechin City
- * Club domestic league appearances and goals

Gavin Gilbert Price MBE (born 29 January 1974 in Perth) is a Scottish professional football coach and former player, who most recently managed Scottish Highland Football League club Brechin City.

He played as a forward for Forfar Athletic, Kinnoull, Meadowbank Thistle, Brechin City, ADO Den Haag, St Johnstone, Stirling Albion and Altrincham.

After retiring as a player, Price managed junior clubs Kinnoull and Jeanfield Swifts. Elgin City manager Jim Weir, who had played with Price at St Johnstone, appointed him as his assistant in November 2014. After Weir left Elgin during the 2017–18 season, Price was appointed caretaker manager, and was given the position permanently on 12 October 2017. Price remained manager for six seasons, and was sacked in April 2023.

Price was appointed a Member of the Order of the British Empire (MBE) in the 2020 Birthday Honours for his services to the community in Aberfeldy during the COVID-19 pandemic in Scotland.

== Managerial statistics ==
As of match played 20 April 2024

Team	From	To	Record				
Team	From	To	G	W	D	L	Win %
Elgin City	1 October 2017	8 April 2023	232	87	40	105	37.50
Brechin City	20 November 2023	20 May 2024	23	16	2	5	69.57
Total			255	103	42	110	40.39

- Statistics for Kinnoull and Jeanfield Swifts are unavailable
