= Mark McGuigan (footballer) =

Scottish footballer (born 1988)

Personal information
- Date of birth: 7 November 1988 (age 38)
- Place of birth: East Kilbride, Scotland
- Height: 1.93 m (6 ft 4 in)
- Position: Forward

Youth career
- –2007: Celtic

Senior career*
Years	Team	Apps	(Gls)
2007–2008	Blantyre Victoria		
2008–2009	St Andrews United		
2009	Forfar Athletic		
2009–2011	St Andrews United		
2009–2012	Abertay University		
2012–2014	Partick Thistle	19	(2)
2012	→ Albion Rovers (loan)	6	(3)
2013–2014	→ Albion Rovers (loan)	31	(3)
2014–2015	Albion Rovers	32	(11)
2015–2017	Stranraer	62	(10)
2017–2021	Stenhousemuir	111	(47)
- * Club domestic league appearances and goals

Mark McGuigan (born 7 November 1988) is a Scottish former professional footballer who played as a forward.

== Career ==
McGuigan was given a chance by Partick Thistle manager Jackie McNamara after a closed-doors friendly between Partick Thistle and a Scottish Universities side. McGuigan scored for the Universities during the match, and was brought to Thistle on trial. He signed a deal with Thistle in March 2012. It took him until the next month to score his first goal, late on in a 3–1 win against Ayr United. He scored his only other Thistle goal against Falkirk on 28 April 2012, the penultimate game of the season.

McGuigan failed to earn a place in the Partick team at the start of the 2012–13 season, and had to be sent on loan to Second Division strugglers Albion Rovers in order to get game time. He was part of the side relegated to the bottom division, where he rejoined Rovers on loan the following season, until January, when he was released by Partick Thistle and was signed permanently by Albion Rovers.

In May 2015, Albion Rovers won the League Two title. Mere days later McGuigan left Rovers to sign for rival Scottish League One side Stranraer. McGuigan spent two years with Stranraer, before signing for Scottish League Two side Stenhousemuir on 16 May 2017.
