= James McDonaugh =

Scottish coach

Personal information
- Date of birth: 16 November 1977 (age 48)
- Place of birth: Scotland

James is a UEFA Pro Licence holder and is currently Hibernian FC Academy Head of Professional Phase. He is also a Scottish football coach, who was manager of Scottish League Two club Edinburgh City.

McDonaugh was Head of Academy Coaching at Hibernian. Whilst at Hibernian James coached the u19 team along with Alistair Stevenson who won the SPFL League and Scottish Youth Cup in 2009. Hibs also won two Foyle Cups, the East of Scotland League Cup and finished third in three consecutive years in the Development League. He was then assistant manager to Peter Houston at Falkirk. They led Falkirk to the 2015 Scottish Cup Final, and second place in SPFL Championship for two consecutive years in 2016 and 2017.

McDonaugh was appointed to first managerial job at Edinburgh City on 10 October 2017, succeeding Gary Jardine. He was awarded SPFL League 2 Manager of the Month in September 2018. In July 2019 his Edinburgh City team won the East of Scotland Cup beating East Kilbride in the final, the club's first win since 1948. McDonaugh again won the SPFL League 2 Manager of the Month award in December 2019, winning all four games and keeping three clean sheets. McDonaugh left the management position in March 2021 and became Edinburgh City's sporting director.

== Managerial statistics ==
As of match played 10 January 2021

Team	Nat	From	To	Record				
Team	Nat	From	To	G	W	D	L	Win %
Edinburgh City	(Scotland)	10 October 2017	7 March 2021	143	79	26	38	55.24
