= Jim Weir =

Scottish footballer (born 1969)

Personal information
- Full name: James McIntosh Weir
- Date of birth: 15 June 1969 (age 57)
- Place of birth: Motherwell, Scotland
- Position: Defender

Team information
- Current team: Forfar Athletic (manager)

Youth career
- –1987: Motherwell Orbiston B.C.

Senior career*
Years	Team	Apps	(Gls)
1987–1993	Hamilton Academical	186	(5)
1993–1994	Hearts	28	(0)
1994–2007	St. Johnstone	205	(7)
2008–2009	Bankfoot Athletic		
2009–2010	Arbroath	1	(0)
2012–2013	Luncarty		
- Kinnoull
Total		420	(12)

Managerial career
- 2007–2008: Montrose
- 2009–2010: Arbroath
- 2010–2012: Brechin City
- 2014–2017: Elgin City
- 2017–2019: Forfar Athletic
- 2024–: Forfar Athletic
- * Club domestic league appearances and goals

James McIntosh Weir (born 15 June 1969) is a Scottish professional football player and coach who manages Scottish League Two club Forfar Athletic. Weir played in the senior Scottish leagues for Hamilton Academical, Hearts and St. Johnstone. He has also worked as manager of Montrose, Arbroath, Brechin City and Elgin City.

== Playing career ==
After starting in youth football with his hometown boys club, Motherwell Orbiston, Weir signed professionally with Hamilton Accies in 1987. He spent six years at Douglas Park, making close to 200 league appearances for the club, before joining Premier League Hearts, then under the guidance of Sandy Clark. Weir's stay at Tynecastle was brief and he moved to St. Johnstone within a year, signed by Paul Sturrock in a swap deal that saw Colin Miller move in the other direction.

He ruptured his Achilles tendon during the final game of the 1997–98 season, which ruled him out of most of the following season. He returned to the starting line-up, as a right-back, on 4 April 1999, against Rangers, and scored the first of Saints' three goals in a 3–1 victory. Following a knee operation, Weir was preparing to return to first-team action against Aberdeen when he broke his nose (for the sixth time) in a training-ground collision with teammate Paddy Connolly. After getting back into the team, he was again injured in training (a broken jaw and cheekbone) which meant he missed more of the campaign.

A serious knee guard injury put Weir out of action until January 2004. He managed seven appearances before being injured again, but was able to play against Newcastle United in his own testimonial match in May, featuring as a young Newcastle side won 2–1 in front of just under 3,000 spectators.

Despite his numerous injuries, Weir, club captain for the majority of his time at St. Johnstone, made over 200 appearances for the Perth club, and received an award when he achieved the 200 mark in August 2001. With his playing days near an end, Weir became assistant manager, firstly, to John Connolly and then Owen Coyle.

After his senior career, Perth-based Weir played Junior football for local sides Bankfoot Athletic, Luncarty and Kinnoull in between managerial appointments.

== Managerial career ==
After thirteen years with St. Johnstone, Weir became the manager of Montrose on 8 February 2007. In his first game in charge, on 10 February, the Gable Endies lost 1–0 at Berwick Rangers. Just over a year after signing a contract extension, Weir was sacked towards the end of September 2008 with Montrose third in the league.

After the resignation of John McGlashan, Weir became the manager of Arbroath on 1 November 2009. Weir failed to save Arbroath from relegation in the 2009–10 Scottish Second Division, as they finished ninth and were beaten by Forfar Athletic in the play-offs. The Lichties also lost to junior club Irvine Meadow in the 2009–10 Scottish Cup.

Weir joined Brechin City on 24 May 2010. Brechin finished fourth in the 2010–11 Scottish Second Division, qualifying for the promotion play-offs, but lost in the final to Ayr United. Weir was sacked by Brechin in September 2012 after the club had made a bad start to the 2012–13 Scottish Second Division.

Weir was appointed manager of Scottish League Two club Elgin City in November 2014. After nearly three years in charge, Weir moved to Forfar Athletic in October 2017. Weir was involved in a car crash after a training session in September 2019. He left the club on 3 November, as he struggled to combine his work commitments and recovery from the car crash.

== Managerial statistics ==
As of match played 14 November 2026

Managerial record by team and tenure
Team	Nat	From	To	Record				
Team	Nat	From	To	G	W	D	L	Win %
Montrose	(Scotland)	8 February 2007	29 September 2008	67	27	15	25	40.30
Arbroath	(Scotland)	1 November 2009	24 May 2010	29	8	10	11	27.59
Brechin City	(Scotland)	24 May 2010	30 September 2012	99	33	28	38	33.33
Elgin City	(Scotland)	27 November 2014	1 October 2017	126	53	24	49	42.06
Forfar Athletic	(Scotland)	2 October 2017	3 November 2019	91	37	14	40	40.66
Forfar Athletic	(Scotland)	20 November 2024	present	100	34	25	41	34.00
Total				513	191	118	204	37.23
