= List of Scottish football championship–winning managers =

The following is a list of football managers and head coaches who have won the Scottish league championship, currently known as the Scottish Premiership.

Some managers have also won the other two major competitions in Scottish football, which are the Scottish Cup and the Scottish League Cup. This results in a manager winning a "double" (two competitions in one season) or a "treble" (all three in one season). There are also three national lower league championships and a national cup competition for lower league clubs, called the Scottish Challenge Cup.

== League ==
=== Scottish League Championship ===
Season	Manager	Club	Ref.
1897–98	(Scotland) Willie Maley (1/16)	Celtic	
1898–99	— (Note: In the early years of organised football, many clubs did not appoint a manager. A management committee or board of directors (if the club had been incorporated) would pick the team instead.)	Rangers	
1899–1900	(Scotland) William Wilton (1/8)	Rangers	
1900–01	(Scotland) William Wilton (2/8)	Rangers	
1901–02	(Scotland) William Wilton (3/8)	Rangers	
1902–03	(Ireland) Dan McMichael	Hibernian	
1903–04	(England) Frank Heaven	Third Lanark	
1904–05	(Scotland) Willie Maley (2/16)	Celtic	
1905–06	(Scotland) Willie Maley (3/16)	Celtic	
1906–07	(Scotland) Willie Maley (4/16)	Celtic	
1907–08	(Scotland) Willie Maley (5/16)	Celtic	
1908–09	(Scotland) Willie Maley (6/16)	Celtic	
1909–10	(Scotland) Willie Maley (7/16)	Celtic	
1910–11	(Scotland) William Wilton (4/8)	Rangers	
1911–12	(Scotland) William Wilton (5/8)	Rangers	
1912–13	(Scotland) William Wilton (6/8)	Rangers	
1913–14	(Scotland) Willie Maley (8/16)	Celtic	
1914–15	(Scotland) Willie Maley (9/16)	Celtic	
1915–16	(Scotland) Willie Maley (10/16)	Celtic	
1916–17	(Scotland) Willie Maley (11/16)	Celtic	
1917–18	(Scotland) William Wilton (7/8)	Rangers	
1918–19	(Scotland) Willie Maley (12/16)	Celtic	
1919–20	(Scotland) William Wilton (8/8)	Rangers	
1920–21	(Scotland) Bill Struth (1/18)	Rangers	
1921–22	(Scotland) Willie Maley (13/16)	Celtic	
1922–23	(Scotland) Bill Struth (2/18)	Rangers	
1923–24	(Scotland) Bill Struth (3/18)	Rangers	
1924–25	(Scotland) Bill Struth (4/18)	Rangers	
1925–26	(Scotland) Willie Maley (14/16)	Celtic	
1926–27	(Scotland) Bill Struth (5/18)	Rangers	
1927–28	(Scotland) Bill Struth (6/18)	Rangers	
1928–29	(Scotland) Bill Struth (7/18)	Rangers	
1929–30	(Scotland) Bill Struth (8/18)	Rangers	
1930–31	(Scotland) Bill Struth (9/18)	Rangers	
1931–32	(Scotland) John Hunter	Motherwell	
1932–33	(Scotland) Bill Struth (10/18)	Rangers	
1933–34	(Scotland) Bill Struth (11/18)	Rangers	
1934–35	(Scotland) Bill Struth (12/18)	Rangers	
1935–36	(Scotland) Willie Maley (15/16)	Celtic	
1936–37	(Scotland) Bill Struth (13/18)	Rangers	
1937–38	(Scotland) Willie Maley (16/16)	Celtic	
1938–39	(Scotland) Bill Struth (14/18)	Rangers	
1946–47	(Scotland) Bill Struth (15/18)	Rangers	
1947–48	(Scotland) Willie McCartney / (Scotland) Hugh Shaw (1/3) (Note: Willie McCartney died in January 1948. Hugh Shaw, who had been the trainer, was appointed as his successor.)	Hibernian	
1948–49	(Scotland) Bill Struth (16/18)	Rangers	
1949–50	(Scotland) Bill Struth (17/18)	Rangers	
1950–51	(Scotland) Hugh Shaw (2/3)	Hibernian	
1951–52	(Scotland) Hugh Shaw (3/3)	Hibernian	
1952–53	(Scotland) Bill Struth (18/18)	Rangers	
1953–54	(Scotland) Jimmy McGrory	Celtic	
1954–55	(Scotland) Dave Halliday	Aberdeen	
1955–56	(Scotland) Scot Symon (1/6)	Rangers	
1956–57	(Scotland) Scot Symon (2/6)	Rangers	
1957–58	(Scotland) Tommy Walker (1/2)	Heart of Midlothian	
1958–59	(Scotland) Scot Symon (3/6)	Rangers	
1959–60	(Scotland) Tommy Walker (2/2)	Heart of Midlothian	
1960–61	(Scotland) Scot Symon (4/6)	Rangers	
1961–62	(Scotland) Bob Shankly	Dundee	
1962–63	(Scotland) Scot Symon (5/6)	Rangers	
1963–64	(Scotland) Scot Symon (6/6)	Rangers	
1964–65	(Scotland) Willie Waddell	Kilmarnock	

Season	Manager	Club	Ref.
1965–66	(Scotland) Jock Stein (1/10)	Celtic	
1966–67	(Scotland) Jock Stein (2/10)	Celtic	
1967–68	(Scotland) Jock Stein (3/10)	Celtic	
1968–69	(Scotland) Jock Stein (4/10)	Celtic	
1969–70	(Scotland) Jock Stein (5/10)	Celtic	
1970–71	(Scotland) Jock Stein (6/10)	Celtic	
1971–72	(Scotland) Jock Stein (7/10)	Celtic	
1972–73	(Scotland) Jock Stein (8/10)	Celtic	
1973–74	(Scotland) Jock Stein (9/10)	Celtic	
1974–75	(Scotland) Jock Wallace (1/3)	Rangers	
1975–76	(Scotland) Jock Wallace (2/3)	Rangers	
1976–77	(Scotland) Jock Stein (10/10)	Celtic	
1977–78	(Scotland) Jock Wallace (3/3)	Rangers	
1978–79	(Scotland) Billy McNeill (1/4)	Celtic	
1979–80	(Scotland) Alex Ferguson (1/3)	Aberdeen	
1980–81	(Scotland) Billy McNeill (2/4)	Celtic	
1981–82	(Scotland) Billy McNeill (3/4)	Celtic	
1982–83	(Scotland) Jim McLean	Dundee United	
1983–84	(Scotland) Alex Ferguson (2/3)	Aberdeen	
1984–85	(Scotland) Alex Ferguson (3/3)	Aberdeen	
1985–86	(Scotland) David Hay	Celtic	
1986–87	(Scotland) Graeme Souness (1/4)	Rangers	
1987–88	(Scotland) Billy McNeill (4/4)	Celtic	
1988–89	(Scotland) Graeme Souness (2/4)	Rangers	
1989–90	(Scotland) Graeme Souness (3/4)	Rangers	
1990–91	(Scotland) Graeme Souness (4/4)/ (Scotland) Walter Smith (1/10) (Note: Graeme Souness left Rangers to become manager of Liverpool in April of the 1990–91 season. Walter Smith who was the assistant manager to Souness at the time at the club was appointed interim manager, before being given the job permanently in May 1991.)	Rangers	
1991–92	(Scotland) Walter Smith (2/10)	Rangers	
1992–93	(Scotland) Walter Smith (3/10)	Rangers	
1993–94	(Scotland) Walter Smith (4/10)	Rangers	
1994–95	(Scotland) Walter Smith (5/10)	Rangers	
1995–96	(Scotland) Walter Smith (6/10)	Rangers	
1996–97	(Scotland) Walter Smith (7/10)	Rangers	
1997–98	(Netherlands) Wim Jansen	Celtic	
1998–99	(Netherlands) Dick Advocaat (1/2)	Rangers	
1999–2000	(Netherlands) Dick Advocaat (2/2)	Rangers	
2000–01	(Northern Ireland) Martin O'Neill (1/4)	Celtic	
2001–02	(Northern Ireland) Martin O'Neill (2/4)	Celtic	
2002–03	(Scotland) Alex McLeish (1/2)	Rangers	
2003–04	(Northern Ireland) Martin O'Neill (3/4)	Celtic	
2004–05	(Scotland) Alex McLeish (2/2)	Rangers	
2005–06	(Scotland) Gordon Strachan (1/3)	Celtic	
2006–07	(Scotland) Gordon Strachan (2/3)	Celtic	
2007–08	(Scotland) Gordon Strachan (3/3)	Celtic	
2008–09	(Scotland) Walter Smith (8/10)	Rangers	
2009–10	(Scotland) Walter Smith (9/10)	Rangers	
2010–11	(Scotland) Walter Smith (10/10)	Rangers	
2011–12	(Northern Ireland) Neil Lennon (1/5)	Celtic	
2012–13	(Northern Ireland) Neil Lennon (2/5)	Celtic	
2013–14	(Northern Ireland) Neil Lennon (3/5)	Celtic	
2014–15	(Norway) Ronny Deila (1/2)	Celtic	
2015–16	(Norway) Ronny Deila (2/2)	Celtic	
2016–17	(Northern Ireland) Brendan Rodgers (1/4)	Celtic	
2017–18	(Northern Ireland) Brendan Rodgers (2/4)	Celtic	
2018–19	(Northern Ireland) Neil Lennon (4/5)	Celtic	
2019–20	(Northern Ireland) Neil Lennon (5/5)	Celtic	
2020–21	(England) Steven Gerrard	Rangers	
2021–22	(Australia) Ange Postecoglou (1/2)	Celtic	
2022–23	(Australia) Ange Postecoglou (2/2)	Celtic	
2023–24	(Northern Ireland) Brendan Rodgers (3/4)	Celtic	
2024–25	(Northern Ireland) Brendan Rodgers (4/4)	Celtic	
2025–26	(Northern Ireland) Martin O'Neill (4/4) (Note: Brendan Rodgers resigned in October 2025. O'Neill then had two spells as interim manager, either side of the month-long tenure of Wilfried Nancy.)	Celtic	

==== By individual ====
Rank	Name	Wins	Club(s)	Winning seasons
1	Bill Struth	18	Rangers	1920–21, 1922–23, 1923–24, 1924–25, 1926–27, 1927–28, 1928–29, 1929–30, 1930–31, 1932–33, 1933–34, 1934–35, 1936–37, 1938–39, 1946–47, 1948–49, 1949–50, 1952–53
2	Willie Maley	16	Celtic	1897–98, 1904–05, 1905–06, 1906–07, 1907–08, 1908–09, 1909–10, 1913–14, 1914–15, 1915–16, 1916–17, 1918–19, 1921–22, 1925–26, 1935–36, 1937–38
3	Jock Stein	10	Celtic	1965–66, 1966–67, 1967–68, 1968–69, 1969–70, 1970–71, 1971–72, 1972–73, 1973–74, 1976–77
3	Walter Smith	10	Rangers	1990–91, 1991–92, 1992–93, 1993–94, 1994–95, 1995–96, 1996–97, 2008–09, 2009–10, 2010–11
4	William Wilton	8	Rangers	1899–1900, 1900–01, 1901–02, 1910–11, 1911–12, 1912–13, 1917–18, 1919–20
5	Scot Symon	6	Rangers	1955–56, 1956–57, 1958–59, 1960–61, 1962–63, 1963–64
6	Neil Lennon	5	Celtic	2011–12, 2012–13, 2013–14, 2018–19, (Note: Brendan Rodgers left Celtic to become manager of Leicester City in February of the 2018–19 season. Neil Lennon was appointed interim manager, before being given the job permanently in May 2019.) 2019–20
7	Martin O'Neill	4	Celtic	2000–01, 2001–02, 2003–04, 2025–26
7	Brendan Rodgers	4	Celtic	2016–17, 2017–18, 2023–24, 2024–25
7	Billy McNeill	4	Celtic	1978–79, 1980–81, 1981–82, 1987–88
11	Graeme Souness	3	Rangers	1986–87, 1988–89, 1989–90
11	Alex Ferguson	3	Aberdeen	1979–80, 1983–84, 1984–85
11	Gordon Strachan	3	Celtic	2005–06, 2006–07, 2007–08
11	Hugh Shaw	3	Hibernian	1947–48, 1950–51, 1951–52
11	Jock Wallace, Jr.	3	Rangers	1974–75, 1975–76, 1977–78
16	Alex McLeish	2	Rangers	2002–03, 2004–05
16	Ange Postecoglou	2	Celtic	2021–22, 2022–23
16	Dick Advocaat	2	Rangers	1998–99, 1999–2000
16	Ronny Deila	2	Celtic	2014–15, 2015–16
16	Tommy Walker	2	Heart of Midlothian	1957–58, 1959–60

==== By nationality ====
Country	Managers	Total
Scotland	22	100
Northern Ireland	3	13
Netherlands	2	3
England	2	2
Norway	1	2
Australia	1	2
Ireland	1	1

=== Lower Leagues (Tiers 2–4) ===
Season	Second tier		Third tier		Fourth tier	
Season	Manager	Club	Manager	Club	Manager	Club
1899–1900		Partick Thistle	division was not founded		division was not founded	
1900–01		St Bernard's	division was not founded		division was not founded	
1901–02		Port Glasgow Athletic	division was not founded		division was not founded	
1902–03		Airdrieonians	division was not founded		division was not founded	
1903–04		Hamilton Academical	division was not founded		division was not founded	
1904–05		Clyde	division was not founded		division was not founded	
1905–06		Leith Athletic	division was not founded		division was not founded	
1906–07		St Bernard's	division was not founded		division was not founded	
1907–08		Raith Rovers	division was not founded		division was not founded	
1908–09		Abercorn	division was not founded		division was not founded	
1909–10		Leith Athletic	division was not founded		division was not founded	
1910–11		Dumbarton	division was not founded		division was not founded	
1911–12		Ayr United	division was not founded		division was not founded	
1912–13		Ayr United	division was not founded		division was not founded	
1913–14	(Scotland) Sandy Paterson (1/3)	Cowdenbeath	division was not founded		division was not founded	
1914–15	(Scotland) Sandy Paterson (2/3)	Cowdenbeath	division was not founded		division was not founded	
1915–16	division did not exist		division was not founded		division was not founded	
1916–17	division did not exist		division was not founded		division was not founded	
1917–18	division did not exist		division was not founded		division was not founded	
1918–19	division did not exist		division was not founded		division was not founded	
1919–20	division did not exist		division was not founded		division was not founded	
1920–21	division did not exist		division was not founded		division was not founded	
1921–22		Alloa Athletic	division was not founded		division was not founded	
1922–23		Queen's Park	division was not founded		division was not founded	
1923–24		St Johnstone		Arthurlie	division was not founded	
1924–25	(Scotland) Jimmy Brownlie (1/2)	Dundee United		Nithsdale Wanderers	division was not founded	
1925–26	(Scotland) Sandy Paterson (3/3)	Dunfermline Athletic	season not completed		division was not founded	
1926–27		Bo'ness United	division did not exist		division was not founded	
1927–28		Ayr United	division did not exist		division was not founded	
1928–29	(Scotland) Jimmy Brownlie (2/2)	Dundee United	division did not exist		division was not founded	
1929–30		Leith Athletic	division did not exist		division was not founded	
1930–31	(Scotland) Russell Moreland	Third Lanark	division did not exist		division was not founded	
1931–32		East Stirlingshire	division did not exist		division was not founded	
1932–33	(Scotland) Bobby Templeton	Hibernian	division did not exist		division was not founded	
1933–34		Albion Rovers	division did not exist		division was not founded	
1934–35	(Scotland) Tom Jennings	Third Lanark	division did not exist		division was not founded	
1935–36	(Scotland) Tully Craig	Falkirk	division did not exist		division was not founded	
1936–37		Ayr United	division did not exist		division was not founded	
1937–38		Raith Rovers	division did not exist		division was not founded	
1938–39	(Scotland) Bill Hodge	Cowdenbeath	division did not exist		division was not founded	
1946–47	(Scotland) George Anderson	Dundee	(Scotland) Tom Fergusson	Stirling Albion	division was not founded	
1947–48	(Scotland) Scot Symon	East Fife	Alex McLuckie	East Stirlingshire	division was not founded	
1948–49	Bert Herdman	Raith Rovers		Forfar Athletic	division was not founded	
1949–50	(Scotland) Jimmy Davies	Greenock Morton		NE: Hibernian 'A'	division was not founded	
1949–50	(Scotland) Jimmy Davies	Greenock Morton		SW: Clyde 'A'	division was not founded	
1950–51	Jimmy McKinnell Jr	Queen of the South		NE: Heart of Midlothian 'A'	division was not founded	
1950–51	Jimmy McKinnell Jr	Queen of the South		SW: Clyde 'A'	division was not founded	
1951–52	(Scotland) Paddy Travers	Clyde		NE: Dundee 'A'	division was not founded	
1951–52	(Scotland) Paddy Travers	Clyde		SW: Rangers 'A'	division was not founded	
1952–53	(Scotland) Tom Fergusson (1/2)	Stirling Albion		NE: Aberdeen 'A'	division was not founded	
1952–53	(Scotland) Tom Fergusson (1/2)	Stirling Albion		SW: Rangers 'A'	division was not founded	
1953–54	(Scotland) George Stevenson	Motherwell		NE: Brechin City	division was not founded	
1953–54	(Scotland) George Stevenson	Motherwell		SW: Rangers 'A'	division was not founded	
1954–55	(Scotland) Willie Steel	Airdrieonians		NE: Aberdeen 'A'	division was not founded	
1954–55	(Scotland) Willie Steel	Airdrieonians		SW: Partick Thistle 'A'	division was not founded	
1955–56	(Scotland) Willie Gibson	Queen's Park	division did not exist		division was not founded	
1956–57	(Scotland) Johnny Haddow (1/2)	Clyde	division did not exist		division was not founded	
1957–58	(Scotland) Tom Fergusson (2/2)	Stirling Albion	division did not exist		division was not founded	
1958–59	(Scotland) Jackie Cox	Ayr United	division did not exist		division was not founded	
1959–60	(Scotland) Bobby Brown	St Johnstone	division did not exist		division was not founded	
1960–61	(Scotland) Danny McLennan	Stirling Albion	division did not exist		division was not founded	
1961–62	(Scotland) Johnny Haddow (2/2)	Clyde	division did not exist		division was not founded	
1962–63	(Scotland) Bobby Brown	St Johnstone	division did not exist		division was not founded	
1963–64	(Scotland) Hal Stewart (1/2)	Greenock Morton	division did not exist		division was not founded	
1964–65	(Scotland) Sammy Baird	Stirling Albion	division did not exist		division was not founded	
1965–66	(Scotland) Ally MacLeod	Ayr United	division did not exist		division was not founded	
1966–67	(Scotland) Hal Stewart (2/2)	Greenock Morton	division did not exist		division was not founded	
1967–68	(Scotland) Alex Wright	St Mirren	division did not exist		division was not founded	
1968–69	(Scotland) Bobby Howitt	Motherwell	division did not exist		division was not founded	
1969–70	(Northern Ireland) Willie Cunningham	Falkirk	division did not exist		division was not founded	
1970–71	(Scotland) Davie McParland	Partick Thistle	division did not exist		division was not founded	
1971–72	(Scotland) Jackie Stewart	Dumbarton	division did not exist		division was not founded	
1972–73	(Scotland) Archie Robertson	Clyde	division did not exist		division was not founded	
1973–74	(Scotland) Ian McMillan	Airdrieonians	division did not exist		division was not founded	
1974–75	(Scotland) John Prentice	Falkirk	division did not exist		division was not founded	
1975–76	(Scotland) Bertie Auld (1/2)	Partick Thistle	(Scotland) Bill Munro	Clydebank	division was not founded	
1976–77	(Scotland) Alex Ferguson	St Mirren	(Scotland) Alex Smith	Stirling Albion	division was not founded	
1977–78	(Scotland) Benny Rooney	Greenock Morton	(Scotland) Craig Brown (1/2)	Clyde	division was not founded	
1978–79	(Scotland) Tommy Gemmell	Dundee	(Scotland) Dave Smith	Berwick Rangers	division was not founded	
1979–80	(Scotland) Bobby Moncur	Heart of Midlothian	(Scotland) John Hagart	Falkirk	division was not founded	
1980–81	(Scotland) Bertie Auld (2/2)	Hibernian	(Scotland) Eddie Hunter	Queen's Park	division was not founded	
1981–82	(Scotland) David Hay	Motherwell	(Scotland) Craig Brown (2/2)	Clyde	division was not founded	
1982–83	(Scotland) Alex Rennie	St Johnstone	(Scotland) Ian Fleming	Brechin City	division was not founded	
1983–84	(Scotland) Tommy McLean (1/2)	Greenock Morton	(Scotland) Doug Houston	Forfar Athletic	division was not founded	
1984–85	(Scotland) Tommy McLean (2/2)	Motherwell	(Scotland) Ian Stewart	Montrose	division was not founded	
1985–86	(Scotland) John Lambie (1/3)	Hamilton Academical	(Scotland) Jim Leishman	Dunfermline Athletic	division was not founded	
1986–87	(Scotland) Allan McGraw	Greenock Morton	(Scotland) Terry Christie	Meadowbank Thistle	division was not founded	
1987–88	(Scotland) John Lambie (2/3)	Hamilton Academical	(Scotland) Ally MacLeod	Ayr United	division was not founded	
1988–89	(Scotland) Jim Leishman (1/2)	Dunfermline Athletic	(Scotland) David Provan	Albion Rovers	division was not founded	
1989–90	(Scotland) Alex Totten	St Johnstone	(Scotland) John Ritchie	Brechin City	division was not founded	
1990–91	(Scotland) Jim Jeffries (1/2)	Falkirk	(Scotland) John Brogan	Stirling Albion	division was not founded	
1991–92	(Scotland) Iain Munro	Dundee	(Scotland) Billy Lamont	Dumbarton	division was not founded	
1992–93	(Northern Ireland) Jimmy Nicholl (1/2)	Raith Rovers	(Scotland) Alex Smith	Clyde	division was not founded	
1993–94	(Scotland) Jim Jeffries (2/2)	Falkirk	(Scotland) Alex McAnespie	Stranraer	division was not founded	
1994–95	(Northern Ireland) Jimmy Nicholl (2/2)	Raith Rovers	(Scotland) Allan McGraw	Greenock Morton	(Scotland) Tommy Campbell	Forfar Athletic
1995–96	(Scotland) Bert Paton	Dunfermline Athletic	(England) Kevin Drinkell	Stirling Albion	(Scotland) Jim Leishman	Livingston
1996–97	(Scotland) Paul Sturrock	St Johnstone	(Scotland) Gordon Dalziel	Ayr United	(Scotland) Steve Paterson	Inverness CT
1997–98	(Scotland) Jocky Scott	Dundee	(Scotland) Campbell Money	Stranraer	(Scotland) Tom Hendrie	Alloa Athletic
1998–99	(Scotland) Alex McLeish	Hibernian	(Scotland) Ray Stewart	Livingston	(Scotland) Neale Cooper	Ross County
1999–2000	(Scotland) Tom Hendrie	St Mirren	(Scotland) Allan Maitland	Clyde	(Scotland) John McCormack (1/2)	Queen's Park
2000–01	(Scotland) Jim Leishman (2/2)	Livingston	(Scotland) John Lambie	Partick Thistle	(Scotland) Ally Dawson	Hamilton Academical
2001–02	(Scotland) John Lambie (3/3)	Partick Thistle	(Scotland) John Connolly	Queen of the South	(Scotland) Dick Campbell (1/2)	Brechin City
2002–03	(Republic of Ireland) Owen Coyle and (Scotland) John Hughes (1/2)	Falkirk	(Spain) Antonio Calderon	Raith Rovers	(Scotland) John McCormack (2/2)	Greenock Morton
2003–04	(Scotland) John Robertson	Inverness CT	(Scotland) Sandy Stewart	Airdrie United	(Scotland) Neil Watt	Stranarer
2004–05	(Scotland) John Hughes (2/2)	Falkirk	(Scotland) Ian Campbell	Brechin City	(Scotland) Rowan Alexander	Gretna
2005–06	(Scotland) Gus McPherson	St Mirren	(Scotland) Rowan Alexander	Gretna	(Finland) Mixu Paatelainen	Cowdenbeath
2006–07	(Scotland) Davie Irons	Gretna	(Scotland) Jim McInally	Greenock Morton	(United States) John Coughlin	Berwick Rangers
2007–08	(Scotland) Billy Reid	Hamilton Academical	(Scotland) Derek Adams	Ross County	(Scotland) David Baikie	East Fife
2008–09	(Scotland) Derek McInnes (1/2)	St Johnstone	(Scotland) John McGlynn (1/3)	Raith Rovers	(Scotland) Jim Chapman	Dumbarton
2009–10	(England) Terry Butcher	Inverness CT	(Scotland) Allan Moore	Stirling Albion	(Scotland) Gary Bollan	Livingston
2010–11	(Scotland) Jim McIntyre	Dunfermline Athletic	(Scotland) Gary Bollan	Livingston	(Scotland) Paul Sheerin	Arbroath
2011–12	(Scotland) Derek Adams	Ross County	(Scotland) Colin Cameron	Cowdenbeath	(Scotland) Paul Hartley (1/2)	Alloa Athletic
2012–13	(Scotland) Alan Archibald	Partick Thistle	(Scotland) Allan Johnston (1/2)	Queen of the South	(Scotland) Ally McCoist	Rangers
2013–14	(Scotland) Paul Hartley	Dundee	(Scotland) Ally McCoist	Rangers	(Scotland) Jim McInally (1/2)	Peterhead
2014–15	(Scotland) Robbie Neilson (1/3)	Heart of Midlothian	(Scotland) Jim Duffy	Greenock Morton	(Scotland) Darren Young (1/2)	Albion Rovers
2015–16	(England) Mark Warburton	Rangers	(Scotland) Allan Johnston (2/2)	Dunfermline Athletic	(Scotland) Gary Naysmith (1/2)	East Fife
2016–17	(Northern Ireland) Neil Lennon	Hibernian	(Scotland) David Hopkin	Livingston	(Scotland) Dick Campbell (2/2)	Arbroath
2017–18	(Scotland) Jack Ross	St Mirren	(Scotland) Ian McCall (1/2)	Ayr United	(Scotland) Stewart Petrie	Montrose
2018–19	(Scotland) Stuart Kettlewell / (Scotland) Steven Ferguson	Ross County	(Scotland) Dick Campbell	Arbroath	(Scotland) Jim McInally (2/2)	Peterhead
2019–20	(Scotland) Robbie Neilson (2/3)	Dundee United	(Scotland) John McGlynn (2/3)	Raith Rovers	(Scotland) Paul Hartley (2/2)	Cove Rangers
2020–21	(Scotland) Robbie Neilson (3/3)	Heart of Midlothian	(Scotland) Ian McCall (2/2)	Partick Thistle	(Scotland) Ray McKinnon	Queen's Park
2021–22	(Scotland) Derek McInnes (2/2)	Kilmarnock	(Scotland) Paul Hartley	Cove Rangers	(Scotland) Kevin Thomson	Kelty Hearts
2022–23	(England) Gary Bowyer	Dundee	(Scotland) James McPake	Dunfermline Athletic	(Scotland) Darren Young (2/2)	Stirling Albion
2023–24	(Republic of Ireland) Jim Goodwin	Dundee United	(Scotland) John McGlynn (3/3)	Falkirk	(Scotland) Gary Naysmith (2/2)	Stenhousemuir
2024–25	(Scotland) John McGlynn	Falkirk	(Scotland) David Gold (Scotland) Colin Hamilton	Arbroath	(Scotland) Jordon Brown (Scotland) Ryan Strachan	Peterhead
2025–26	(Finland) Simo Valakari	St Johnstone	(Scotland) Scott Kellacher	Inverness Caledonian Thistle	(Scotland) Mick Kennedy	East Kilbride

== Treble and Double winning managers ==
=== League, Scottish Cup and League Cup "domestic" treble ===
Rank	Name	Wins	Club(s)	Winning seasons
1	Brendan Rodgers	2	Celtic	2016–17, 2017–18
1	Jock Stein	2	Celtic	1966–67, 1968–69
1	Jock Wallace, Jr	2	Rangers	1975–76, 1977–78
4	Bill Struth	1	Rangers	1948–49
4	Scot Symon	1	Rangers	1963–64
4	Walter Smith	1	Rangers	1992–93
4	Dick Advocaat	1	Rangers	1998–99
4	Martin O'Neill	1	Celtic	2000–01
4	Alex McLeish	1	Rangers	2002–03
4	Neil Lennon	1	Celtic	2019–20
4	Ange Postecoglou	1	Celtic	2022–23

=== League and Scottish Cup double ===
Rank	Name	Wins	Club(s)	Winning seasons
1	Bill Struth	6	Rangers	1927–28, 1929–30, 1933–34, 1934–35, 1949–50, 1952–53
2	Jock Stein	4	Celtic	1970–71, 1971–72, 1973–74, 1976–77
3	Willie Maley	3	Celtic	1906–07, 1907–08, 1913–14
3	Walter Smith	3	Rangers	1991–92, 1995–96, 2008–09
5	Neil Lennon	2	Celtic	2012–13, 2018–19
5	Martin O'Neill	2	Celtic	2003–04, 2025–26
7	Alex Ferguson	1	Aberdeen	1983–84
7	Billy McNeil	1	Celtic	1987–88
7	Brendan Rodgers	1	Celtic	2023–24
7	Dick Advocaat	1	Rangers	1999–2000
7	Gordon Strachan	1	Celtic	2006–07
7	Jimmy McGrory	1	Celtic	1953–54
7	Scot Symon	1	Rangers	1962–63

=== League and League Cup double ===
Rank	Name	Wins	Club(s)	Winning seasons
1	Walter Smith	4	Rangers	1993–94, 1996–97, 2009–10, 2010–11
2	Jock Stein	3	Celtic	1965–66, 1967–68, 1969–70
2	Graeme Souness	3	Rangers	1986–87, 1988–89, 1990–91
4	Brendan Rodgers	1	Celtic	2024–25
5	Bill Struth	1	Rangers	1946–47
5	Tommy Walker	1	Heart of Midlothian	1959–60
5	Scot Symon	1	Rangers	1960–61
5	Wim Jansen	1	Celtic	1997–98
5	Alex McLeish	1	Rangers	2004–05
5	Gordon Strachan	1	Celtic	2005–06
5	Ronny Deila	1	Celtic	2014–15
5	Ange Postecoglou	1	Celtic	2021–22

=== Scottish Cup and League Cup double ===
Rank	Name	Wins	Club(s)	Winning seasons
1	Scot Symon	1	Rangers	1961–62
1	Jock Stein	1	Celtic	1974–75
1	John Greig	1	Rangers	1978–79
1	Alex Ferguson	1	Aberdeen	1985–86
1	Alex Smith and Jocky Scott	1	Aberdeen	1989–90
1	Alex McLeish	1	Rangers	2001–02
1	Walter Smith	1	Rangers	2007–08
1	Callum Davidson	1	St Johnstone	2020–21
