= 1937–38 Scottish Football League =

Scottish football season

Statistics of the Scottish Football League in season 1937–38.

== Scottish League Division One ==
Pos	Team	Pld	W	D	L	GF	GA	GD	Pts
1	Celtic	38	27	7	4	114	42	+72	61
2	Heart of Midlothian	38	26	6	6	90	50	+40	58
3	Rangers	38	18	13	7	75	49	+26	49
4	Falkirk	38	19	9	10	82	52	+30	47
5	Motherwell	38	17	10	11	78	69	+9	44
6	Aberdeen	38	15	9	14	74	59	+15	39
7	Partick Thistle	38	15	9	14	68	70	−2	39
8	St Johnstone	38	16	7	15	78	81	−3	39
9	Third Lanark	38	11	13	14	68	73	−5	35
10	Hibernian	38	11	13	14	57	65	−8	35
11	Arbroath	38	11	13	14	58	79	−21	35
12	Queen's Park	38	11	12	15	59	74	−15	34
13	Hamilton Academical	38	13	7	18	81	76	+5	33
14	St Mirren	38	14	5	19	58	66	−8	33
15	Clyde	38	10	13	15	68	78	−10	33
16	Queen of the South	38	11	11	16	58	71	−13	33
17	Ayr United	38	9	15	14	66	85	−19	33
18	Kilmarnock	38	12	9	17	65	91	−26	33
19	Dundee	38	13	6	19	70	74	−4	32
20	Morton	38	6	3	29	64	127	−63	15

Source: RSSSF

== Scottish League Division Two ==
Pos	Team	Pld	W	D	L	GF	GA	GD	Pts	Promotion or relegation
1	Raith Rovers	34	27	5	2	142	54	+88	59	Promotion to the 1938–39 First Division
2	Albion Rovers	34	20	8	6	97	50	+47	48	Promotion to the 1938–39 First Division
3	Airdrieonians	34	21	5	8	100	53	+47	47	
4	St Bernard's	34	20	5	9	75	49	+26	45	
5	Cowdenbeath	34	17	9	8	115	71	+44	43	
6	East Fife	34	19	5	10	94	61	+33	43	
7	Dumbarton	34	17	5	12	85	66	+19	39	
8	Stenhousemuir	34	17	5	12	87	78	+9	39	
9	Dunfermline Athletic	34	17	5	12	82	76	+6	39	
10	Leith Athletic	34	16	5	13	71	56	+15	37	
11	Alloa Athletic	34	11	4	19	78	106	−28	26	
12	King's Park	34	11	4	19	64	96	−32	26	
13	East Stirlingshire	34	9	7	18	55	95	−40	25	
14	Dundee United	34	9	5	20	69	104	−35	23	
15	Forfar Athletic	34	8	6	20	67	100	−33	22	
16	Montrose	34	7	8	19	56	88	−32	22	
17	Edinburgh City	34	7	3	24	77	125	−48	17	
18	Brechin City	34	5	2	27	53	139	−86	12	

Source: "1937-1938 Division 2 - SPFL Archive". SPFL.

== See also ==
- 1937–38 in Scottish football
