= 1982–83 Scottish Football League =

Scottish football season

Statistics of the Scottish Football League in season 1982–83.

== Scottish Premier Division ==
Pos	Team	Pld	W	D	L	GF	GA	GD	Pts	Qualification or relegation
1	Dundee United (C)	36	24	8	4	90	35	+55	56	Qualification for the European Cup first round
2	Celtic	36	25	5	6	90	36	+54	55	Qualification for the UEFA Cup first round
3	Aberdeen	36	25	5	6	76	25	+51	55	Qualification for the Cup Winners' Cup first round
4	Rangers	36	13	12	11	53	41	+12	38	Qualification for the Cup Winners' Cup first round
5	St Mirren	36	11	12	13	47	51	−4	34	Qualification for the UEFA Cup first round
6	Dundee	36	9	11	16	42	53	−11	29	
7	Hibernian	36	7	15	14	35	51	−16	29	
8	Motherwell	36	11	5	20	39	73	−34	27	
9	Morton (R)	36	6	8	22	36	81	−45	20	Relegation to the 1983–84 Scottish First Division
10	Kilmarnock (R)	36	3	11	22	28	91	−63	17	Relegation to the 1983–84 Scottish First Division

Source: Statto
Rules for classification: 1) points; 2) goal difference; 3) number of goals scored.
(C) Champions; (R) Relegated

== Scottish First Division ==
Pos	Team	Pld	W	D	L	GF	GA	GD	Pts	Promotion or relegation
1	St Johnstone (C, P)	39	25	5	9	59	37	+22	55	Promotion to the Premier Division
2	Heart of Midlothian (P)	39	22	10	7	79	38	+41	54	Promotion to the Premier Division
3	Clydebank	39	20	10	9	72	49	+23	50	
4	Partick Thistle	39	20	9	10	66	45	+21	49	
5	Airdrieonians	39	16	7	16	62	46	+16	39	
6	Alloa Athletic	39	14	11	14	52	52	0	39	
7	Dumbarton	39	13	10	16	50	59	−9	36	
8	Falkirk	39	15	6	18	45	55	−10	36	
9	Raith Rovers	39	13	8	18	64	63	+1	34	
10	Clyde	39	14	6	19	55	66	−11	34	
11	Hamilton Academical	39	11	12	16	54	66	−12	34	
12	Ayr United	39	12	8	19	45	61	−16	32	
13	Dunfermline Athletic (R)	39	7	17	15	39	69	−30	31	Relegation to the Second Division
14	Queen's Park (R)	39	6	11	22	44	80	−36	23	Relegation to the Second Division

Source: RSSSF
Rules for classification: 1) points; 2) goal difference; 3) number of goals scored.
(C) Champions; (P) Promoted; (R) Relegated

== Scottish Second Division ==
Pos	Team	Pld	W	D	L	GF	GA	GD	Pts	Promotion
1	Brechin City (C, P)	39	21	13	5	77	38	+39	55	Promotion to the First Division
2	Meadowbank Thistle (P)	39	23	8	8	64	45	+19	54	Promotion to the First Division
3	Arbroath	39	21	7	11	78	51	+27	49	
4	Forfar Athletic	39	18	12	9	58	38	+20	48	
5	Stirling Albion	39	18	10	11	57	41	+16	46	
6	East Fife	39	16	11	12	68	43	+25	43	
7	Queen of the South	39	17	8	14	75	55	+20	42	
8	Cowdenbeath	39	13	12	14	54	53	+1	38	
9	Berwick Rangers	39	13	10	16	47	60	−13	36	
10	Albion Rovers	39	14	6	19	55	66	−11	34	
11	Stenhousemuir	39	7	15	17	43	66	−23	29	
12	Stranraer	39	10	7	22	46	79	−33	27	
13	East Stirlingshire	39	7	9	23	41	79	−38	23	
14	Montrose	39	8	6	25	37	86	−49	22	

Source: "1982-1983 Second Division - SPFL Archive". SPFL.
Rules for classification: 1) points; 2) goal difference; 3) number of goals scored.
(C) Champions; (P) Promoted

== See also ==
- 1982–83 in Scottish football
