= 1936–37 Scottish Football League =

Scottish football season

Statistics of the Scottish Football League in season 1936–37.

== Scottish League Division One ==
Pos	Team	Pld	W	D	L	GF	GA	GD	Pts
1	Rangers	38	26	9	3	88	32	+56	61
2	Aberdeen	38	23	8	7	89	44	+45	54
3	Celtic	38	22	8	8	89	58	+31	52
4	Motherwell	38	22	7	9	96	54	+42	51
5	Heart of Midlothian	38	24	3	11	99	60	+39	51
6	Third Lanark	38	20	6	12	79	61	+18	46
7	Falkirk	38	19	6	13	98	66	+32	44
8	Hamilton Academical	38	18	5	15	91	96	−5	41
9	Dundee	38	12	15	11	58	69	−11	39
10	Clyde	38	16	6	16	59	70	−11	38
11	Kilmarnock	38	14	9	15	60	70	−10	37
12	St Johnstone	38	14	8	16	74	68	+6	36
13	Partick Thistle	38	11	12	15	73	68	+5	34
14	Arbroath	38	13	5	20	57	84	−27	31
15	Queen's Park	38	9	12	17	51	77	−26	30
16	St Mirren	38	11	7	20	68	81	−13	29
17	Hibernian	38	6	13	19	54	83	−29	25
18	Queen of the South	38	8	8	22	49	95	−46	24
19	Dunfermline Athletic	38	5	11	22	65	98	−33	21
20	Albion Rovers	38	5	6	27	53	116	−63	16

Source: RSSSF

== Scottish League Division Two ==
Pos	Team	Pld	W	D	L	GF	GA	GD	Pts	Promotion or relegation
1	Ayr United	34	25	4	5	122	49	+73	54	Promotion to the 1937–38 First Division
2	Morton	34	23	5	6	110	42	+68	51	Promotion to the 1937–38 First Division
3	St Bernard's	34	22	4	8	100	51	+49	48	
4	Airdrieonians	34	18	8	8	85	60	+25	44	
5	East Fife	34	15	8	11	76	51	+25	38	
6	Cowdenbeath	34	14	10	10	75	59	+16	38	
7	East Stirlingshire	34	18	2	14	81	78	+3	38	
8	Raith Rovers	34	16	4	14	72	66	+6	36	
9	Alloa Athletic	34	13	7	14	64	65	−1	33	
10	Stenhousemuir	34	14	4	16	82	86	−4	32	
11	Leith Athletic	34	13	5	16	62	65	−3	31	
12	Forfar Athletic	34	11	8	15	73	89	−16	30	
13	Montrose	34	11	6	17	65	98	−33	28	
14	Dundee United	34	9	9	16	72	97	−25	27	
15	Dumbarton	34	11	5	18	57	83	−26	27	
16	Brechin City	34	8	9	17	64	98	−34	25	
17	King's Park	34	11	3	20	61	106	−45	25	
18	Edinburgh City	34	2	3	29	42	120	−78	7	

Source: "1936-1937 Division 2 - SPFL Archive". SPFL.
