= 1934–35 Scottish Football League =

Scottish football season

Statistics of the Scottish Football League in season 1934–35.

== Scottish League Division One ==
Pos	Team	Pld	W	D	L	GF	GA	GD	Pts
1	Rangers	38	25	5	8	96	46	+50	55
2	Celtic	38	24	4	10	92	45	+47	52
3	Hearts	38	20	10	8	87	51	+36	50
4	Hamilton Academical	38	19	10	9	87	67	+20	48
5	St Johnstone	38	18	10	10	66	46	+20	46
6	Aberdeen	38	17	10	11	68	54	+14	44
7	Motherwell	38	15	10	13	83	64	+19	40
8	Dundee	38	16	8	14	63	63	0	40
9	Kilmarnock	38	16	6	16	76	68	+8	38
10	Clyde	38	14	10	14	71	69	+2	38
11	Hibernian	38	14	8	16	59	70	−11	36
12	Queen's Park	38	13	10	15	61	80	−19	36
13	Partick Thistle	38	15	5	18	61	68	−7	35
14	Airdrieonians	38	13	7	18	64	72	−8	33
15	Dunfermline Athletic	38	13	5	20	56	96	−40	31
16	Albion Rovers	38	10	9	19	62	77	−15	29
17	Queen of the South	38	11	7	20	52	72	−20	29
18	Ayr United	38	12	5	21	61	112	−51	29
19	St Mirren	38	11	5	22	49	70	−21	27
20	Falkirk	38	9	6	23	58	82	−24	24

Source: RSSSF

== Scottish League Division Two ==
Pos	Team	Pld	W	D	L	GF	GA	GD	Pts	Promotion or relegation
1	Third Lanark	34	23	6	5	94	43	+51	52	Promotion to the 1935–36 First Division
2	Arbroath	34	23	4	7	78	42	+36	50	Promotion to the 1935–36 First Division
3	St Bernard's	34	20	7	7	103	47	+56	47	
4	Dundee United	34	18	6	10	105	65	+40	42	
5	Stenhousemuir	34	17	5	12	86	80	+6	39	
6	Morton	34	17	4	13	88	64	+24	38	
7	King's Park	34	18	2	14	86	71	+15	38	
8	Leith Athletic	34	16	5	13	69	71	−2	37	
9	East Fife	34	16	3	15	79	73	+6	35	
10	Alloa Athletic	34	12	10	12	67	60	+7	34	
11	Forfar Athletic	34	13	8	13	77	73	+4	34	
12	Cowdenbeath	34	13	6	15	84	75	+9	32	
13	Raith Rovers	34	13	3	18	68	73	−5	29	
14	East Stirlingshire	34	11	7	16	57	76	−19	29	
15	Brechin City	34	10	6	18	51	98	−47	26	
16	Dumbarton	34	9	4	21	60	105	−45	22	
17	Montrose	34	7	6	21	58	105	−47	20	
18	Edinburgh City	34	3	2	29	44	133	−89	8	

Source: "1934-1935 Division 2 - SPFL Archive". SPFL (in Malay).
