= 1978–79 Scottish Football League =

Scottish football season

Statistics of the Scottish Football League in season 1978–79.

== Scottish Premier Division ==
Pos	Team	Pld	W	D	L	GF	GA	GD	Pts	Qualification or relegation
1	Celtic (C)	36	21	6	9	61	37	+24	48	Qualification for the European Cup first round
2	Rangers	36	18	9	9	52	35	+17	45	Qualification for the Cup Winners' Cup first round
3	Dundee United	36	18	8	10	56	37	+19	44	Qualification for the UEFA Cup first round
4	Aberdeen	36	13	14	9	59	36	+23	40	Qualification for the UEFA Cup first round
5	Hibernian	36	12	13	11	44	48	−4	37	
6	St Mirren	36	15	6	15	45	41	+4	36	
7	Morton	36	12	12	12	52	53	−1	36	
8	Partick Thistle	36	13	8	15	42	39	+3	34	
9	Heart of Midlothian (R)	36	8	7	21	39	71	−32	23	Relegation to the 1979–80 Scottish First Division
10	Motherwell (R)	36	5	7	24	33	86	−53	17	Relegation to the 1979–80 Scottish First Division

Source: Statto and RSSSF
Rules for classification: 1) points; 2) goal difference; 3) number of goals scored.
(C) Champions; (R) Relegated

== Scottish First Division ==
Pos	Team	Pld	W	D	L	GF	GA	GD	Pts	Promotion or relegation
1	Dundee (C, P)	39	24	7	8	69	36	+33	55	Promotion to the Premier Division
2	Kilmarnock (P)	39	22	10	7	72	36	+36	54	Promotion to the Premier Division
3	Clydebank	39	24	6	9	78	50	+28	54	
4	Ayr United	39	21	5	13	73	54	+19	47	
5	Hamilton Academical	39	17	9	13	63	61	+2	43	
6	Airdrieonians	39	16	8	15	72	61	+11	40	
7	Dumbarton	39	14	11	14	58	50	+8	39	
8	Stirling Albion	39	13	9	17	43	55	−12	35	
9	Clyde	39	13	8	18	54	65	−11	34	
10	Arbroath	39	11	11	17	50	61	−11	33	
11	Raith Rovers	39	12	8	19	48	55	−7	32	
12	St Johnstone	39	10	11	18	57	66	−9	31	
13	Montrose (R)	39	8	9	22	55	92	−37	25	Relegation to the Second Division
14	Queen of the South (R)	39	8	8	23	43	93	−50	24	Relegation to the Second Division

Source: RSSSF and statto
Rules for classification: 1) points; 2) goal difference; 3) number of goals scored.
(C) Champions; (P) Promoted; (R) Relegated

== Scottish Second Division ==
Pos	Team	Pld	W	D	L	GF	GA	GD	Pts	Promotion
1	Berwick Rangers (C, P)	39	22	10	7	82	44	+38	54	Promotion to the First Division
2	Dunfermline Athletic (P)	39	19	14	6	66	40	+26	52	Promotion to the First Division
3	Falkirk	39	19	12	8	66	37	+29	50	
4	East Fife	39	17	9	13	64	53	+11	43	
5	Cowdenbeath	39	16	10	13	63	58	+5	42	
6	Alloa Athletic	39	16	9	14	57	62	−5	41	
7	Albion Rovers	39	15	10	14	57	56	+1	40	
8	Forfar Athletic	39	13	12	14	55	52	+3	38	
9	Stranraer	39	18	2	19	52	66	−14	38	
10	Stenhousemuir	39	12	8	19	54	58	−4	32	
11	Brechin City	39	9	14	16	49	65	−16	32	
12	East Stirlingshire	39	12	8	19	61	87	−26	32	
13	Queen's Park	39	8	12	19	46	57	−11	28	
14	Meadowbank Thistle	39	8	8	23	37	74	−37	24	

Source: "1978-1979 Second Division - SPFL Archive". SPFL.
Rules for classification: 1) points; 2) goal difference; 3) number of goals scored.
(C) Champions; (P) Promoted

== See also ==
- 1978–79 in Scottish football
