= 1903–04 Scottish Football League =

Scottish football season

Statistics of the Scottish Football League in season 1903–04.

== Scottish League Division One ==
| Pos | Team | Pld | W | D | L | GF | GA | GD | Pts | Qualification or relegation |
|---|---|---|---|---|---|---|---|---|---|---|
| 1 | Third Lanark (C) | 26 | 20 | 3 | 3 | 61 | 26 | +35 | 43 | Champions |
| 2 | Heart of Midlothian | 26 | 18 | 3 | 5 | 63 | 35 | +28 | 39 | |
| =3 | Celtic | 26 | 18 | 2 | 6 | 68 | 27 | +41 | 38 | |
| =3 | Rangers | 26 | 16 | 6 | 4 | 80 | 33 | +47 | 38 | |
| 5 | Dundee | 26 | 13 | 2 | 11 | 54 | 45 | +9 | 28 | |
| =6 | St Mirren | 26 | 11 | 5 | 10 | 45 | 38 | +7 | 27 | |
| =6 | Partick Thistle | 26 | 10 | 7 | 9 | 46 | 41 | +5 | 27 | |
| 8 | Queen's Park | 26 | 6 | 9 | 11 | 28 | 47 | −19 | 21 | |
| 9 | Port Glasgow Athletic | 26 | 8 | 4 | 14 | 32 | 49 | −17 | 20 | |
| 10 | Hibernian | 26 | 7 | 5 | 14 | 29 | 40 | −11 | 19 | |
| =11 | Morton | 26 | 7 | 4 | 15 | 32 | 53 | −21 | 18 | |
| =11 | Airdrieonians | 26 | 7 | 4 | 15 | 32 | 62 | −30 | 18 | |
| 13 | Motherwell | 26 | 6 | 3 | 17 | 26 | 61 | −35 | 15 | |
| 14 | Kilmarnock | 26 | 4 | 5 | 17 | 24 | 63 | −39 | 13 | |

Source: nozdrul.plus.com
(C) Champions

== Scottish League Division Two ==
| Pos | Team | Pld | W | D | L | GF | GA | GD | Pts | Qualification |
|---|---|---|---|---|---|---|---|---|---|---|
| 1 | Hamilton Academical (C) | 22 | 16 | 5 | 1 | 56 | 19 | +37 | 37 | |
| 2 | Clyde | 22 | 12 | 5 | 5 | 51 | 36 | +15 | 29 | |
| 3 | Ayr | 22 | 11 | 6 | 5 | 34 | 31 | +3 | 28 | |
| 4 | Falkirk | 22 | 11 | 4 | 7 | 50 | 36 | +14 | 26 | |
| 5 | East Stirlingshire | 22 | 8 | 5 | 9 | 35 | 40 | −5 | 21 | |
| 5 | Raith Rovers | 22 | 8 | 5 | 9 | 40 | 38 | +2 | 21 | |
| 7 | Leith Athletic | 22 | 8 | 4 | 10 | 42 | 40 | +2 | 20 | |
| 7 | St Bernard's | 22 | 9 | 2 | 11 | 31 | 43 | −12 | 20 | |
| 9 | Albion Rovers | 22 | 8 | 5 | 9 | 47 | 37 | +10 | 19 (Note: Albion Rovers were docked two points.) | |
| 10 | Abercorn | 22 | 6 | 4 | 12 | 40 | 55 | −15 | 16 | |
| 11 | Arthurlie | 22 | 5 | 5 | 12 | 37 | 50 | −13 | 15 | |
| 12 | Ayr Parkhouse (R) | 22 | 3 | 4 | 15 | 24 | 62 | −38 | 10 | Did not apply for re-election (Note: Ayr Parkhouse did not apply for re-election to compete for the next season and were replaced by Aberdeen.) |

Source: statto.com
Rules for classification: Teams finish equal if level on points. Points system: 2 points for a win, 1 point for a draw, 0 points for a loss
(C) Champions; (R) Relegated

== See also ==
- 1903–04 in Scottish football
