= 1986–87 Scottish Football League =

Scottish football season

Statistics of the Scottish Football League in season 1986–87.

== Scottish Premier Division ==
Pos	Team	Pld	W	D	L	GF	GA	GD	Pts	Qualification or relegation
1	Rangers (C)	44	31	7	6	85	23	+62	69	Qualification for the European Cup first round
2	Celtic	44	27	9	8	90	41	+49	63	Qualification for the UEFA Cup first round
3	Dundee United	44	24	12	8	85	34	+51	60	Qualification for the UEFA Cup first round
4	Aberdeen	44	21	16	7	63	29	+34	58	Qualification for the UEFA Cup first round
5	Heart of Midlothian	44	21	14	9	64	43	+21	56	
6	Dundee	44	18	12	14	74	57	+17	48	
7	St Mirren	44	12	12	20	36	51	−15	36	Qualification for the Cup Winners' Cup first round
8	Motherwell	44	11	12	21	43	64	−21	34	
9	Hibernian	44	10	13	21	44	70	−26	33	
10	Falkirk	44	8	10	26	31	70	−39	26	
11	Clydebank (R)	44	6	12	26	35	93	−58	24	Relegation to the 1987–88 Scottish First Division
12	Hamilton Academical (R)	44	6	9	29	39	93	−54	21	Relegation to the 1987–88 Scottish First Division

Source: Statto
Rules for classification: 1) points; 2) goal difference; 3) number of goals scored.
(C) Champions; (R) Relegated

== Scottish First Division ==
Pos	Team	Pld	W	D	L	GF	GA	GD	Pts	Promotion or relegation
1	Morton (C, P)	44	24	9	11	88	56	+32	57	Promotion to the Premier Division
2	Dunfermline Athletic (P)	44	23	10	11	61	41	+20	56	Promotion to the Premier Division
3	Dumbarton	44	23	7	14	67	52	+15	53	
4	East Fife	44	15	21	8	68	55	+13	51	
5	Airdrieonians	44	20	11	13	58	46	+12	51	
6	Kilmarnock	44	17	11	16	62	53	+9	45	
7	Forfar Athletic	44	14	15	15	61	63	−2	43	
8	Partick Thistle	44	12	15	17	49	54	−5	39	
9	Clyde	44	11	16	17	48	56	−8	38	
10	Queen of the South	44	11	12	21	50	71	−21	34	
11	Brechin City (R)	44	11	10	23	44	72	−28	32	Relegation to the Second Division
12	Montrose (R)	44	9	11	24	37	74	−37	29	Relegation to the Second Division

Source: RSSSF and statto
Rules for classification: 1) points; 2) goal difference; 3) number of goals scored.
(C) Champions; (P) Promoted; (R) Relegated

== Scottish Second Division ==
Pos	Team	Pld	W	D	L	GF	GA	GD	Pts	Promotion
1	Meadowbank Thistle (C, P)	39	23	9	7	69	38	+31	55	Promotion to the First Division
2	Raith Rovers (P)	39	16	20	3	73	44	+29	52	Promotion to the First Division
3	Stirling Albion	39	20	12	7	55	33	+22	52	
4	Ayr United	39	22	8	9	70	49	+21	52	
5	St Johnstone	39	16	13	10	59	49	+10	45	
6	Alloa Athletic	39	17	7	15	48	50	−2	41	
7	Cowdenbeath	39	16	8	15	59	55	+4	40	
8	Albion Rovers	39	15	9	15	48	51	−3	39	
9	Queen's Park	39	9	19	11	48	49	−1	37	
10	Stranraer	39	9	11	19	41	59	−18	29	
11	Arbroath	39	11	7	21	46	66	−20	29	
12	Stenhousemuir	39	10	9	20	37	58	−21	29	
13	East Stirlingshire	39	6	11	22	33	56	−23	23	
14	Berwick Rangers	39	8	7	24	40	69	−29	23	

Source: "1986-1987 Second Division - SPFL Archive". SPFL.
Rules for classification: 1) points; 2) goal difference; 3) number of goals scored.
(C) Champions; (P) Promoted

== See also ==
- 1986–87 in Scottish football
