= 1976–77 Scottish Football League =

Statistics of Scottish Football League in season 1976/1977.

== Scottish Premier Division ==
Pos	Team	Pld	W	D	L	GF	GA	GD	Pts	Qualification or relegation
1	Celtic (C)	36	23	9	4	79	39	+40	55	Qualification for the European Cup first round
2	Rangers	36	18	10	8	62	37	+25	46	Qualification for the Cup Winners' Cup first round
3	Aberdeen	36	16	11	9	56	42	+14	43	Qualification for the UEFA Cup first round
4	Dundee United	36	16	9	11	54	45	+9	41	Qualification for the UEFA Cup first round
5	Partick Thistle	36	11	13	12	40	44	−4	35	
6	Hibernian	36	8	18	10	34	35	−1	34	
7	Motherwell	36	10	12	14	57	60	−3	32	
8	Ayr United	36	11	8	17	44	68	−24	30	
9	Heart of Midlothian (R)	36	7	13	16	49	66	−17	27	Relegation to the 1977–78 Scottish First Division
10	Kilmarnock (R)	36	4	9	23	32	71	−39	17	Relegation to the 1977–78 Scottish First Division

Source: Statto
Rules for classification: 1) points; 2) goal difference; 3) number of goals scored.
(C) Champions; (R) Relegated

== Scottish First Division ==
Pos	Team	Pld	W	D	L	GF	GA	GD	Pts	Promotion or relegation
1	St Mirren (C, P)	39	25	12	2	91	38	+53	62	Promotion to the Premier Division
2	Clydebank (P)	39	24	10	5	89	38	+51	58	Promotion to the Premier Division
3	Dundee	39	21	9	9	90	55	+35	51	
4	Morton	39	20	10	9	77	52	+25	50	
5	Montrose	39	16	9	14	61	62	−1	41	
6	Airdrieonians	39	13	12	14	63	58	+5	38	
7	Dumbarton	39	14	9	16	63	68	−5	37	
8	Arbroath	39	17	3	19	46	62	−16	37	
9	Queen of the South	39	11	13	15	58	65	−7	35	
10	Hamilton Academical	39	11	10	18	44	59	−15	32	
11	St Johnstone	39	8	13	18	42	64	−22	29	
12	East Fife	39	8	13	18	40	71	−31	29	
13	Raith Rovers (R)	39	8	11	20	45	68	−23	27	Relegation to the Second Division
14	Falkirk (R)	39	6	8	25	36	85	−49	20	Relegation to the Second Division

Source: RSSSF and statto
Rules for classification: 1) points; 2) goal difference; 3) number of goals scored.
(C) Champions; (P) Promoted; (R) Relegated

== Scottish Second Division ==
Pos	Team	Pld	W	D	L	GF	GA	GD	Pts	Promotion
1	Stirling Albion (C, P)	39	22	11	6	59	29	+30	55	Promotion to the First Division
2	Alloa Athletic (P)	39	19	13	7	73	45	+28	51	Promotion to the First Division
3	Dunfermline Athletic	39	20	10	9	52	36	+16	50	
4	Stranraer	39	20	6	13	74	53	+21	46	
5	Queen's Park	39	17	11	11	65	51	+14	45	
6	Albion Rovers	39	15	12	12	74	61	+13	42	
7	Clyde	39	15	11	13	68	64	+4	41	
8	Berwick Rangers	39	13	10	16	37	51	−14	36	
9	Stenhousemuir	39	15	5	19	38	49	−11	35	
10	East Stirlingshire	39	12	8	19	47	63	−16	32	
11	Meadowbank Thistle	39	8	16	15	41	57	−16	32	
12	Cowdenbeath	39	13	5	21	46	64	−18	31	
13	Brechin City	39	7	12	20	51	77	−26	26	
14	Forfar Athletic	39	7	10	22	43	68	−25	24	

Source: "1976-1977 Second Division - SPFL Archive". SPFL.
Rules for classification: 1) points; 2) goal difference; 3) number of goals scored.
(C) Champions; (P) Promoted

== See also ==
- 1976–77 in Scottish football
