= 1977–78 Scottish Football League =

Scottish football season

Statistics of the Scottish Football League in season 1977–78.

== Scottish Premier Division ==
Pos	Team	Pld	W	D	L	GF	GA	GD	Pts	Qualification or relegation
1	Rangers (C)	36	24	7	5	76	39	+37	55	Qualification for the European Cup first round
2	Aberdeen	36	22	9	5	68	29	+39	53	Qualification for the Cup Winners' Cup first round
3	Dundee United	36	16	8	12	42	32	+10	40	Qualification for the UEFA Cup first round
4	Hibernian	36	15	7	14	51	43	+8	37	Qualification for the UEFA Cup first round
5	Celtic	36	15	6	15	63	54	+9	36	
6	Motherwell	36	13	7	16	45	52	−7	33	
7	Partick Thistle	36	14	5	17	52	62	−10	33	
8	St Mirren	36	11	8	17	52	63	−11	30	
9	Ayr United (R)	36	9	6	21	36	68	−32	24	Relegation to the 1978–79 Scottish First Division
10	Clydebank (R)	36	6	7	23	23	64	−41	19	Relegation to the 1978–79 Scottish First Division

Source: Statto
Rules for classification: 1) points; 2) goal difference; 3) number of goals scored.
(C) Champions; (R) Relegated

== Scottish First Division ==
Pos	Team	Pld	W	D	L	GF	GA	GD	Pts	Promotion or relegation
1	Morton (C, P)	39	25	8	6	85	42	+43	58	Promotion to the Premier Division
2	Heart of Midlothian (P)	39	24	10	5	77	42	+35	58	Promotion to the Premier Division
3	Dundee	39	25	7	7	91	44	+47	57	
4	Dumbarton	39	16	17	6	65	48	+17	49	
5	Stirling Albion	39	15	12	12	60	52	+8	42	
6	Kilmarnock	39	14	12	13	52	46	+6	40	
7	Hamilton Academical	39	12	12	15	54	56	−2	36	
8	St Johnstone	39	15	6	18	52	64	−12	36	
9	Arbroath	39	11	13	15	42	55	−13	35	
10	Airdrieonians	39	12	10	17	50	64	−14	34	
11	Montrose	39	10	9	20	55	71	−16	29	
12	Queen of the South	39	8	13	18	44	68	−24	29	
13	Alloa Athletic (R)	39	8	8	23	44	84	−40	24	Relegation to the Second Division
14	East Fife (R)	39	4	11	24	39	74	−35	19	Relegation to the Second Division

Source: RSSSF and statto
Rules for classification: 1) points; 2) goal difference; 3) number of goals scored.
(C) Champions; (P) Promoted; (R) Relegated

== Scottish Second Division ==
Pos	Team	Pld	W	D	L	GF	GA	GD	Pts	Promotion
1	Clyde (C, P)	39	21	11	7	71	32	+39	53	Promotion to the First Division
2	Raith Rovers (P)	39	19	15	5	63	34	+29	53	Promotion to the First Division
3	Dunfermline Ath	39	18	12	9	64	41	+23	48	
4	Berwick Rangers	39	16	16	7	68	51	+17	48	
5	Falkirk	39	15	14	10	51	46	+5	44	
6	Forfar Athletic	39	17	8	14	61	55	+6	42	
7	Queen's Park	39	13	15	11	52	51	+1	41	
8	Albion Rovers	39	16	8	15	68	68	0	40	
9	East Stirlingshire	39	15	8	16	55	65	−10	38	
10	Cowdenbeath	39	13	8	18	75	78	−3	34	
11	Stranraer	39	13	7	19	54	63	−9	33	
12	Stenhousemuir	39	10	10	19	43	67	−24	30	
13	Meadowbank Thistle	39	6	10	23	43	89	−46	22	
14	Brechin City	39	7	6	26	45	73	−28	20	

Source: "1977-1978 Second Division - SPFL Archive". SPFL.
Rules for classification: 1) points; 2) goal difference; 3) number of goals scored.
(C) Champions; (P) Promoted

== See also ==
- 1977–78 in Scottish football
