= 1981–82 Scottish Football League =

Scottish football season

Statistics of the Scottish Football League in season 1981–82.

== Scottish Premier Division ==
Pos	Team	Pld	W	D	L	GF	GA	GD	Pts	Qualification or relegation
1	Celtic (C)	36	24	7	5	79	33	+46	55	Qualification for the European Cup first round
2	Aberdeen	36	23	7	6	71	29	+42	53	Qualification for the Cup Winners' Cup first round
3	Rangers	36	16	11	9	57	45	+12	43	Qualification for the UEFA Cup first round
4	Dundee United	36	15	10	11	61	38	+23	40	Qualification for the UEFA Cup first round
5	St Mirren	36	14	9	13	49	52	−3	37	
6	Hibernian	36	11	14	11	38	40	−2	36	
7	Morton	36	9	12	15	31	54	−23	30	
8	Dundee	36	11	4	21	46	72	−26	26	
9	Partick Thistle (R)	36	6	10	20	35	59	−24	22	Relegation to the 1982–83 Scottish First Division
10	Airdrieonians (R)	36	5	8	23	31	76	−45	18	Relegation to the 1982–83 Scottish First Division

Source: Statto
Rules for classification: 1) points; 2) goal difference; 3) number of goals scored.
(C) Champions; (R) Relegated

== Scottish First Division ==
Pos	Team	Pld	W	D	L	GF	GA	GD	Pts	Promotion or relegation
1	Motherwell (C, P)	39	26	9	4	92	36	+56	61	Promotion to the Premier Division
2	Kilmarnock (P)	39	17	17	5	60	29	+31	51	Promotion to the Premier Division
3	Heart of Midlothian	39	21	8	10	65	37	+28	50	
4	Clydebank	39	19	8	12	61	53	+8	46	
5	St Johnstone	39	17	8	14	69	60	+9	42	
6	Ayr United	39	15	12	12	56	50	+6	42	
7	Hamilton Academical	39	16	8	15	52	49	+3	40	
8	Queen's Park	39	13	10	16	41	41	0	36	
9	Falkirk	39	11	14	14	49	52	−3	36	
10	Dunfermline Athletic	39	11	14	14	46	56	−10	36	
11	Dumbarton	39	13	9	17	49	61	−12	35	
12	Raith Rovers	39	11	7	21	31	59	−28	29	
13	East Stirlingshire (R)	39	7	10	22	38	77	−39	24	Relegation to the Second Division
14	Queen of the South (R)	39	4	10	25	44	93	−49	18	Relegation to the Second Division

Source: RSSSF
Rules for classification: 1) points; 2) goal difference; 3) number of goals scored.
(C) Champions; (P) Promoted; (R) Relegated

== Scottish Second Division ==
Pos	Team	Pld	W	D	L	GF	GA	GD	Pts	Promotion
1	Clyde (C, P)	39	24	11	4	79	38	+41	59	Promotion to the First Division
2	Alloa Athletic (P)	39	19	12	8	66	42	+24	50	Promotion to the First Division
3	Arbroath	39	20	10	9	62	50	+12	50	
4	Berwick Rangers	39	20	8	11	66	38	+28	48	
5	Brechin City	39	18	10	11	61	43	+18	46	
6	Forfar Athletic	39	15	15	9	59	35	+24	45	
7	East Fife	39	14	9	16	48	51	−3	37	
8	Stirling Albion	39	12	11	16	39	44	−5	35	
9	Cowdenbeath	39	11	13	15	51	57	−6	35	
10	Montrose	39	12	8	19	49	74	−25	32	
11	Albion Rovers	39	13	5	21	52	74	−22	31	
12	Meadowbank Thistle	39	10	10	19	49	62	−13	30	
13	Stenhousemuir	39	11	6	22	41	65	−24	28	
14	Stranraer	39	7	6	26	36	85	−49	20	

Source: "1981-1982 Second Division - SPFL Archive". SPFL.
Rules for classification: 1) points; 2) goal difference; 3) number of goals scored.
(C) Champions; (P) Promoted

== See also ==
- 1981–82 in Scottish football
