= 1962–63 Scottish Football League =

Scottish Football League Division One
- Season: 1962-63
- Champions: Rangers
- Relegated: Clyde, Raith Rovers
- 1963–64 European Cup: Rangers
- Matches played: 306
- Goals scored: 1,101 (3.6 per match)

Statistics of the Scottish Football League in season 1962–63.

== Scottish League Division One ==
| Pos | Team | Pld | W | D | L | GF | GA | GR | Pts |
|---|---|---|---|---|---|---|---|---|---|
| 1 | Rangers (C) | 34 | 25 | 7 | 2 | 94 | 28 | 3.357 | 57 |
| 2 | Kilmarnock | 34 | 20 | 8 | 6 | 92 | 40 | 2.300 | 48 |
| 3 | Partick Thistle | 34 | 20 | 6 | 8 | 66 | 44 | 1.500 | 46 |
| 4 | Celtic | 34 | 19 | 6 | 9 | 76 | 44 | 1.727 | 44 |
| 5 | Hearts | 34 | 17 | 9 | 8 | 85 | 59 | 1.441 | 43 |
| 6 | Aberdeen | 34 | 17 | 7 | 10 | 70 | 47 | 1.489 | 41 |
| 7 | Dundee United | 34 | 15 | 11 | 8 | 67 | 52 | 1.288 | 41 |
| 8 | Dunfermline | 34 | 13 | 8 | 13 | 50 | 47 | 1.064 | 34 |
| 9 | Dundee | 34 | 12 | 9 | 13 | 60 | 49 | 1.224 | 33 |
| 10 | Motherwell | 34 | 10 | 11 | 13 | 60 | 63 | 0.952 | 31 |
| 11 | Airdrieonians | 34 | 14 | 2 | 18 | 52 | 76 | 0.684 | 30 |
| 12 | St Mirren | 34 | 10 | 8 | 16 | 52 | 72 | 0.722 | 28 |
| 13 | Falkirk | 34 | 12 | 3 | 19 | 54 | 69 | 0.783 | 27 |
| 14 | Third Lanark | 34 | 9 | 8 | 17 | 56 | 68 | 0.824 | 26 |
| 15 | Queen of the South | 34 | 10 | 6 | 18 | 36 | 75 | 0.480 | 26 |
| 16 | Hibernian | 34 | 8 | 9 | 17 | 47 | 67 | 0.701 | 25 |
| 17 | Clyde (R) | 34 | 9 | 5 | 20 | 49 | 83 | 0.590 | 23 |
| 18 | Raith Rovers (R) | 34 | 2 | 5 | 27 | 35 | 118 | 0.297 | 9 |

Source: RSSSF
(C) Champions; (R) Relegated

Scottish Football League Division Two
- Season: 1962-63
- Champions: St Johnstone
- Promoted: St Johnstone, East Stirlingshire
- Matches played: 342
- Goals scored: 1,300 (3.8 per match)

== Scottish League Division Two ==
| Pos | Team | Pld | W | D | L | GF | GA | GR | Pts | Promotion or relegation |
|---|---|---|---|---|---|---|---|---|---|---|
| 1 | St Johnstone (C, P) | 36 | 25 | 5 | 6 | 83 | 37 | 2.243 | 55 | Promotion to 1963–64 Scottish First Division |
| 2 | East Stirlingshire (P) | 36 | 20 | 9 | 7 | 80 | 50 | 1.600 | 49 | Promotion to 1963–64 Scottish First Division |
| 3 | Morton | 36 | 23 | 2 | 11 | 100 | 49 | 2.041 | 48 | |
| 4 | Hamilton Academical | 36 | 18 | 8 | 10 | 69 | 56 | 1.232 | 44 | |
| 5 | Stranraer | 36 | 16 | 10 | 10 | 81 | 70 | 1.157 | 42 | |
| 6 | Arbroath | 36 | 18 | 4 | 14 | 74 | 51 | 1.451 | 40 | |
| 7 | Albion Rovers | 36 | 18 | 2 | 16 | 72 | 79 | 0.911 | 38 | |
| 8 | Cowdenbeath | 36 | 15 | 7 | 14 | 72 | 61 | 1.180 | 37 | |
| 9 | Alloa Athletic | 36 | 15 | 6 | 15 | 57 | 56 | 1.018 | 36 | |
| 10 | Stirling Albion | 36 | 16 | 4 | 16 | 74 | 75 | 0.987 | 36 | |
| 11 | East Fife | 36 | 15 | 6 | 15 | 60 | 69 | 0.870 | 36 | |
| 12 | Dumbarton | 36 | 15 | 4 | 17 | 64 | 64 | 1.000 | 34 | |
| 13 | Ayr United | 36 | 13 | 8 | 15 | 68 | 77 | 0.883 | 34 | |
| 14 | Queen's Park | 36 | 13 | 6 | 17 | 66 | 72 | 0.917 | 32 | |
| 15 | Montrose | 36 | 13 | 5 | 18 | 57 | 70 | 0.814 | 31 | |
| 16 | Stenhousemuir | 36 | 13 | 5 | 18 | 54 | 75 | 0.720 | 31 | |
| 17 | Berwick Rangers | 36 | 11 | 7 | 18 | 57 | 77 | 0.740 | 29 | |
| 18 | Forfar Athletic | 36 | 9 | 5 | 22 | 73 | 99 | 0.737 | 23 | |
| 19 | Brechin City | 36 | 3 | 3 | 30 | 39 | 113 | 0.345 | 9 | |

Source: statto.com
Rules for classification: 1) points; 2) goal ratio.
(C) Champions; (P) Promoted
