= 1929–30 Scottish Football League =

Scottish football season

Statistics of the Scottish Football League in season 1929–30.

== Scottish League Division One ==
Pos	Team	Pld	W	D	L	GF	GA	GD	Pts
1	Rangers	38	28	4	6	94	32	+62	60
2	Motherwell	38	25	5	8	104	48	+56	55
3	Aberdeen	38	23	7	8	85	61	+24	53
4	Celtic	38	22	5	11	88	46	+42	49
5	St Mirren	38	18	5	15	73	56	+17	41
6	Partick Thistle	38	16	9	13	72	61	+11	41
7	Falkirk	38	16	9	13	62	64	−2	41
8	Kilmarnock	38	15	9	14	77	73	+4	39
9	Ayr United	38	16	6	16	70	92	−22	38
10	Heart of Midlothian	38	14	9	15	69	69	0	37
11	Clyde	38	13	11	14	64	69	−5	37
12	Airdrieonians	38	16	4	18	60	66	−6	36
13	Hamilton Academical	38	14	7	17	76	81	−5	35
14	Dundee	38	14	6	18	51	58	−7	34
15	Queen's Park	38	15	4	19	67	80	−13	34
16	Cowdenbeath	38	13	7	18	64	74	−10	33
17	Hibernian	38	9	11	18	45	62	−17	29
18	Morton	38	10	7	21	67	95	−28	27
19	Dundee United	38	7	8	23	56	109	−53	22
20	St Johnstone	38	6	7	25	48	96	−48	19

Source: "1929-1930 Division 1 - SPFL Archive". SPFL.

== Scottish League Division Two ==
Pos	Team	Pld	W	D	L	GF	GA	GD	Pts	Promotion or relegation
1	Leith Athletic	38	23	11	4	92	42	+50	57	Promotion to the 1930–31 First Division
2	East Fife	38	26	5	7	114	58	+56	57	Promotion to the 1930–31 First Division
3	Albion Rovers	38	24	6	8	101	60	+41	54	
4	Third Lanark	38	23	6	9	92	53	+39	52	
5	Raith Rovers	38	18	8	12	94	67	+27	44	
6	King's Park	38	17	8	13	109	80	+29	42	
7	Queen of the South	38	18	6	14	65	63	+2	42	
8	Forfar Athletic	38	18	5	15	98	95	+3	41	
9	Arbroath	38	16	7	15	83	87	−4	39	
10	Dunfermline Athletic	38	16	6	16	99	85	+14	38	
11	Montrose	38	14	10	14	79	87	−8	38	
12	East Stirlingshire	38	16	4	18	83	75	+8	36	
13	Bo'ness	38	15	4	19	67	95	−28	34	
14	St Bernard's	38	13	6	19	65	65	0	32	
15	Armadale	38	13	5	20	56	91	−35	31	
16	Dumbarton	38	14	2	22	77	95	−18	30	
17	Stenhousemuir	38	11	5	22	75	108	−33	27	
18	Clydebank	38	7	10	21	66	92	−26	24	
19	Alloa Athletic	38	9	6	23	55	104	−49	24	
20	Brechin City	38	7	4	27	57	125	−68	18	

== See also ==
- 1929–30 in Scottish football
