= 1966–67 Scottish Football League =

Scottish football season

Statistics of the Scottish Football League in season 1966–67.

== Scottish League Division One ==
Pos	Team	Pld	W	D	L	GF	GA	GD	Pts
1	Celtic	34	26	6	2	111	33	+78	58
2	Rangers	34	24	7	3	92	31	+61	55
3	Clyde	34	20	6	8	64	48	+16	46
4	Aberdeen	34	17	8	9	72	38	+34	42
5	Hibernian	34	19	4	11	72	49	+23	42
6	Dundee	34	16	9	9	74	51	+23	41
7	Kilmarnock	34	16	8	10	59	46	+13	40
8	Dunfermline Athletic	34	14	10	10	72	52	+20	38
9	Dundee United	34	14	9	11	68	62	+6	37
10	Motherwell	34	10	11	13	59	60	−1	31
11	Hearts	34	11	8	15	39	48	−9	30
12	Partick Thistle	34	9	12	13	49	68	−19	30
13	Airdrieonians	34	11	6	17	41	53	−12	28
14	Falkirk	34	11	4	19	33	70	−37	26
15	St Johnstone	34	10	5	19	53	73	−20	25
16	Stirling Albion	34	5	9	20	31	85	−54	19
17	St Mirren (R)	34	4	7	23	25	81	−56	15
18	Ayr United (R)	34	1	7	26	20	86	−66	9

Source: RSSSF
(R) Relegated

== Scottish League Division Two ==
Pos	Team	Pld	W	D	L	GF	GA	GD	Pts	Promotion or relegation
1	Morton	38	33	3	2	113	20	+93	69	Promotion to the 1967–68 First Division
2	Raith Rovers	38	27	4	7	95	44	+51	58	Promotion to the 1967–68 First Division
3	Arbroath	38	25	7	6	75	32	+43	57	
4	Hamilton Academical	38	18	8	12	74	60	+14	44	
5	East Fife	38	19	4	15	70	63	+7	42	
6	Cowdenbeath	38	16	8	14	70	55	+15	40	
7	Queen's Park	38	15	10	13	78	68	+10	40	
8	Albion Rovers	38	17	6	15	66	62	+4	40	
9	Queen of the South	38	15	9	14	84	76	+8	39	
10	Berwick Rangers	38	16	6	16	63	55	+8	38	
11	Third Lanark	38	13	8	17	67	78	−11	34	Club folded
12	Montrose	38	13	8	17	63	77	−14	34	
13	Alloa	38	15	4	19	55	74	−19	34	
14	Dumbarton	38	12	9	17	56	64	−8	33	
15	Stranraer	38	13	7	18	57	73	−16	33	
16	Forfar Athletic	38	12	3	23	74	106	−32	27	
17	Stenhousemuir	38	9	9	20	62	104	−42	27	
18	Clydebank	38	8	8	22	59	92	−33	24	
19	East Stirlingshire	38	7	10	21	44	87	−43	24	
20	Brechin City	38	8	7	23	58	93	−35	23	

Source: "1966-1967 Second Division - SPFL Archive". SPFL (in Malay).

== See also ==
- 1966–67 in Scottish football
