= 1983–84 Scottish Football League =

Scottish football season

Statistics of the Scottish Football League in season 1983–84.

== Scottish Premier Division ==
Pos	Team	Pld	W	D	L	GF	GA	GD	Pts	Qualification or relegation
1	Aberdeen (C)	36	25	7	4	78	21	+57	57	Qualification for the European Cup first round
2	Celtic	36	21	8	7	80	41	+39	50	Qualification for the Cup Winners' Cup first round
3	Dundee United	36	18	11	7	67	39	+28	47	Qualification for the UEFA Cup first round
4	Rangers	36	15	12	9	53	41	+12	42	Qualification for the UEFA Cup first round
5	Heart of Midlothian	36	10	16	10	38	47	−9	36	Qualification for the UEFA Cup first round
6	St Mirren	36	9	14	13	55	59	−4	32	
7	Hibernian	36	12	7	17	45	55	−10	31	
8	Dundee	36	11	5	20	50	74	−24	27	
9	St Johnstone (R)	36	10	3	23	36	81	−45	23	Relegation to the 1984–85 Scottish First Division
10	Motherwell (R)	36	4	7	25	31	75	−44	15	Relegation to the 1984–85 Scottish First Division

Source: Statto
Rules for classification: 1) points; 2) goal difference; 3) number of goals scored.
(C) Champions; (R) Relegated

== Scottish First Division ==
Pos	Team	Pld	W	D	L	GF	GA	GD	Pts	Promotion or relegation
1	Morton (C, P)	39	21	12	6	75	46	+29	54	Promotion to the Premier Division
2	Dumbarton (P)	39	20	11	8	66	44	+22	51	Promotion to the Premier Division
3	Partick Thistle	39	19	8	12	67	50	+17	46	
4	Clydebank	39	16	13	10	62	50	+12	45	
5	Brechin City	39	14	14	11	56	58	−2	42	
6	Kilmarnock	39	16	6	17	57	53	+4	38	
7	Falkirk	39	16	6	17	46	54	−8	38	
8	Clyde	39	12	13	14	53	50	+3	37	
9	Hamilton Academical	39	11	14	14	43	46	−3	36	
10	Airdrieonians	39	13	10	16	45	53	−8	36	
11	Meadowbank Thistle	39	12	10	17	49	69	−20	34	
12	Ayr United	39	10	12	17	56	70	−14	32	
13	Raith Rovers (R)	39	10	11	18	53	62	−9	31	Relegation to the Second Division
14	Alloa Athletic (R)	39	8	10	21	41	64	−23	26	Relegation to the Second Division

Source: RSSSF and statto
Rules for classification: 1) points; 2) goal difference; 3) number of goals scored.
(C) Champions; (P) Promoted; (R) Relegated

== Scottish Second Division ==
Pos	Team	Pld	W	D	L	GF	GA	GD	Pts	Promotion
1	Forfar Athletic (C, P)	39	27	9	3	73	31	+42	63	Promotion to the First Division
2	East Fife (P)	39	20	7	12	57	43	+14	47	Promotion to the First Division
3	Berwick Rangers	39	16	11	12	56	38	+18	43	
4	Stirling Albion	39	14	14	11	51	41	+10	42	
5	Arbroath	39	18	6	15	51	46	+5	42	
6	Queen of the South	39	16	10	13	51	46	+5	42	
7	Stenhousemuir	39	14	11	14	47	57	−10	39	
8	Stranraer	39	13	12	14	47	47	0	38	
9	Dunfermline Athletic	39	13	10	16	44	45	−1	36	
10	Queen's Park	39	14	8	17	58	63	−5	36	
11	East Stirlingshire	39	10	11	18	52	66	−14	31	
12	Montrose	39	12	7	20	36	56	−20	31	
13	Cowdenbeath	39	10	9	20	44	58	−14	29	
14	Albion Rovers	39	8	11	20	46	76	−30	27	

Source: "1983-1984 Second Division - SPFL Archive". SPFL.
Rules for classification: 1) points; 2) goal difference; 3) number of goals scored.
(C) Champions; (P) Promoted

== See also ==
- 1983–84 in Scottish football
