= 1969–70 Scottish Football League =

Scottish football season

Statistics of Scottish Football League in season 1969/1970.

== Scottish League Division One ==
Pos	Team	Pld	W	D	L	GF	GA	GD	Pts
1	Celtic	34	27	3	4	96	33	+63	57
2	Rangers	34	19	7	8	67	40	+27	45
3	Hibernian	34	19	6	9	65	40	+25	44
4	Heart of Midlothian	34	13	12	9	50	36	+14	38
5	Dundee United	34	16	6	12	62	64	−2	38
6	Dundee	34	15	6	13	49	44	+5	36
7	Kilmarnock	34	13	10	11	62	57	+5	36
8	Aberdeen	34	14	7	13	55	45	+10	35
9	Morton	34	13	9	12	52	52	0	35
10	Dunfermline Athletic	34	15	5	14	45	45	0	35
11	Motherwell	34	11	10	13	49	51	−2	32
12	Airdrieonians	34	12	8	14	59	64	−5	32
13	St Johnstone	34	11	9	14	50	62	−12	31
14	Ayr United	34	12	6	16	37	52	−15	30
15	St Mirren	34	8	9	17	39	54	−15	25
16	Clyde	34	9	7	18	34	56	−22	25
17	Raith Rovers	34	5	11	18	32	67	−35	21
18	Partick Thistle	34	5	7	22	41	82	−41	17

Source: "1969-1970 First Division - SPFL Archive". SPFL.

== Scottish League Division Two ==
Pos	Team	Pld	W	D	L	GF	GA	GD	Pts	Promotion or relegation
1	Falkirk	36	25	6	5	94	34	+60	56	Promotion to the 1970–71 First Division
2	Cowdenbeath	36	24	7	5	81	35	+46	55	Promotion to the 1970–71 First Division
3	Queen of the South	36	22	6	8	72	49	+23	50	
4	Stirling Albion	36	18	10	8	70	40	+30	46	
5	Arbroath	36	20	4	12	76	39	+37	44	
6	Alloa Athletic	36	19	5	12	62	41	+21	43	
7	Dumbarton	36	17	6	13	55	46	+9	40	
8	Montrose	36	15	7	14	57	55	+2	37	
9	Berwick Rangers	36	15	5	16	67	55	+12	35	
10	East Fife	36	15	4	17	59	63	−4	34	
11	Albion Rovers	36	14	5	17	53	64	−11	33	
12	East Stirlingshire	36	14	5	17	58	75	−17	33	
13	Clydebank	36	10	10	16	47	65	−18	30	
14	Brechin City	36	11	6	19	47	74	−27	28	
15	Queen's Park	36	10	6	20	38	62	−24	26	
16	Stenhousemuir	36	10	6	20	47	89	−42	26	
17	Stranraer	36	9	7	20	56	75	−19	25	
18	Forfar Athletic	36	11	1	24	55	83	−28	23	
19	Hamilton Academical	36	8	4	24	42	92	−50	20	

Source: "1969-1970 Second Division - SPFL Archive". SPFL.

== See also ==
- 1969–70 in Scottish football
