= 1974–75 Scottish Football League =

Scottish football season

Statistics of Scottish Football League in season 1974–75. At the end of this season, the leagues were reconstructed into three divisions of 10, 14 and 14. This meant that the top ten teams in Division One entered the new Premier Division, while the rest of the Division One clubs entered the new First Division.

== Scottish League Division One ==
Pos	Team	Pld	W	D	L	GF	GA	GD	Pts	Qualification
1	Rangers (C)	34	25	6	3	86	33	+53	56	Qualification to European Cup first round
2	Hibernian	34	20	9	5	69	37	+32	49	Qualification to UEFA Cup First round
3	Celtic	34	20	5	9	81	41	+40	45	Qualification to European Cup Winners' Cup First round
4	Dundee United	34	19	7	8	72	43	+29	45	Qualification to UEFA Cup First round
5	Aberdeen	34	16	9	9	66	43	+23	41	
6	Dundee	34	16	6	12	48	42	+6	38	
7	Ayr United	34	14	8	12	50	61	−11	36	
8	Hearts	34	11	13	10	47	52	−5	35	
9	St Johnstone	34	11	12	11	41	44	−3	34	
10	Motherwell	34	14	5	15	52	57	−5	33	
11	Airdrieonians	34	11	9	14	43	55	−12	31	Relegation to Scottish First Division
12	Kilmarnock	34	8	15	11	52	68	−16	31	Relegation to Scottish First Division
13	Partick Thistle	34	10	10	14	48	62	−14	30	Relegation to Scottish First Division
14	Dumbarton	34	7	10	17	44	55	−11	24	Relegation to Scottish First Division
15	Dunfermline Athletic	34	7	9	18	46	66	−20	23	Relegation to Scottish First Division
16	Clyde	34	6	10	18	40	63	−23	22	Relegation to Scottish First Division
17	Morton	34	6	10	18	31	62	−31	22	Relegation to Scottish First Division
18	Arbroath	34	5	7	22	34	66	−32	17	Relegation to Scottish First Division

Source: Soccerbase and League Tables
(C) Champions

== Scottish League Division Two ==
Pos	Team	Pld	W	D	L	GF	GA	GD	Pts	Promotion or relegation
1	Falkirk (C)	38	26	2	10	76	29	+47	54	Promotion to the 1975–76 First Division with restructuring
2	Queen of the South	38	23	7	8	77	33	+44	53	Promotion to the 1975–76 First Division with restructuring
3	Montrose	38	23	7	8	70	37	+33	53	Promotion to the 1975–76 First Division with restructuring
4	Hamilton Academical	38	21	7	10	69	30	+39	49	Promotion to the 1975–76 First Division with restructuring
5	East Fife	38	20	7	11	57	42	+15	47	Promotion to the 1975–76 First Division with restructuring
6	St Mirren	38	19	8	11	74	52	+22	46	Promotion to the 1975–76 First Division with restructuring
7	Clydebank	38	18	8	12	50	40	+10	44	
8	Stirling Albion	38	17	9	12	67	55	+12	43	
9	Berwick Rangers	38	17	6	15	53	49	+4	40	
10	East Stirlingshire	38	16	8	14	56	52	+4	40	
11	Stenhousemuir	38	14	11	13	52	42	+10	39	
12	Albion Rovers	38	16	7	15	72	64	+8	39	
13	Raith Rovers	38	14	9	15	48	44	+4	37	
14	Stranraer	38	12	11	15	47	65	−18	35	
15	Alloa Athletic	38	11	11	16	49	56	−7	33	
16	Queen’s Park	38	10	10	18	41	54	−13	30	
17	Brechin City	38	9	7	22	44	85	−41	25	
18	Meadowbank Thistle	38	9	5	24	26	87	−61	23	
19	Cowdenbeath	38	5	11	22	39	76	−37	21	
20	Forfar Athletic	38	1	7	30	27	102	−75	9	

Source: "1974-1975 Second Division - SPFL Archive". SPFL.
(C) Champions
