= 1904–05 Scottish Football League =

Scottish football season

Statistics of the Scottish Football League in season 1904–05.

== Scottish League Division One ==
Pos	Team	Pld	W	D	L	GF	GA	GD	Pts	Qualification or relegation
=1	Celtic (C)	26	18	5	3	68	31	+37	41	Champions
=1	Rangers	26	19	3	4	83	28	+55	41	
3	Third Lanark	26	14	7	5	60	28	+32	35	
4	Airdrieonians	26	11	5	10	38	45	−7	27	
5	Hibernian	26	9	8	9	39	39	0	26	
6	Partick Thistle	26	12	2	12	36	56	−20	26	
7	Heart of Midlothian	26	11	3	12	46	44	+2	25	
8	Dundee	26	10	5	11	38	32	+6	25	
9	Kilmarnock	26	9	5	12	29	45	−16	23	
10	St Mirren	26	9	4	13	33	36	−3	22	
11	Port Glasgow Athletic	26	8	5	13	30	51	−21	21	
12	Queen's Park	26	6	8	12	28	45	−17	20	
13	Morton	26	7	4	15	27	50	−23	18	
14	Motherwell	26	6	2	18	28	53	−25	14	

Source: SPFL Archive
(C) Champions

== Scottish League Division Two ==
Pos	Team	Pld	W	D	L	GF	GA	GD	Pts	Promotion or relegation
1	Clyde (C)	22	13	6	3	38	22	+16	32	
2	Falkirk (P)	22	12	4	6	32	25	+7	28	Promoted to the 1905–06 Scottish Division One
3	Hamilton Academical	22	12	3	7	40	24	+16	27	
4	Leith Athletic	22	10	4	8	36	26	+10	24	
5	Arthurlie	22	9	5	8	37	41	−4	23	
5	Ayr	22	11	1	10	46	37	+9	23	
7	Aberdeen (P)	22	7	7	8	36	26	+10	21	Promoted to the 1905–06 Scottish Division One
8	Albion Rovers	22	8	4	10	38	53	−15	20	
9	East Stirlingshire	22	7	5	10	37	38	−1	19	
9	Raith Rovers	22	9	1	12	30	34	−4	19	
11	Abercorn	22	8	1	13	31	45	−14	17	
12	St Bernard's	22	3	5	14	23	53	−30	11	

Source: statto.com
Rules for classification: Teams finish equal if level on points. Points system: 2 points for a win, 1 point for a draw, 0 points for a loss
(C) Champions; (P) Promoted

== See also ==
- 1904–05 in Scottish football
