= 1905–06 Scottish Football League =

Scottish football season

Statistics of the Scottish Football League in season 1905–06.

== Scottish League Division One ==
Pos	Team	Pld	W	D	L	GF	GA	GD	Pts	Qualification or relegation
1	Celtic (C)	30	24	1	5	76	19	+57	49	Champions
2	Heart of Midlothian	30	18	7	5	64	27	+37	43	
3	Airdrieonians	30	15	8	7	53	31	+22	38	
4	Rangers	30	15	7	8	58	48	+10	37	
5	Partick Thistle	30	15	6	9	44	40	+4	36	
6	Third Lanark	30	16	2	12	62	38	+24	34	
7	Dundee	30	11	12	7	40	33	+7	34	
8	St Mirren	30	13	5	12	41	37	+4	31	
9	Morton	30	10	6	14	35	54	−19	26	
10	Motherwell	30	9	8	13	50	64	−14	26	
11	Hibernian	30	10	5	15	35	40	−5	25	
12	Aberdeen	30	8	8	14	37	49	−12	24	
13	Falkirk	30	9	5	16	53	69	−16	23	
14	Port Glasgow Athletic	30	6	8	16	38	68	−30	20	
15	Kilmarnock	30	8	4	18	46	68	−22	20	
16	Queen's Park	30	5	4	21	41	88	−47	14	

Source: "1905-1906 Division 1 - SPFL Archive". SPFL.
(C) Champions

== Scottish League Division Two ==
Pos	Team	Pld	W	D	L	GF	GA	GD	Pts	Promotion or relegation
1	Leith Athletic (C)	22	15	4	3	46	22	+24	34	
2	Clyde (P)	22	11	9	2	37	21	+16	31	Promoted to the 1906–07 Scottish Division One
3	Albion Rovers	22	12	3	7	48	31	+17	27	
4	Hamilton Academical (P)	22	12	2	8	45	33	+12	26	Promoted to the 1906–07 Scottish Division One
5	Arthurlie	22	10	2	10	46	46	0	22	
5	St Bernard's	22	9	4	9	42	34	+8	22	
7	Ayr	22	9	3	10	44	51	−7	21	
8	Raith Rovers	22	6	7	9	36	42	−6	19	
9	Abercorn	22	6	5	11	31	46	−15	17	
9	Cowdenbeath	22	7	3	12	28	40	−12	17	
11	Vale of Leven	22	6	4	12	33	49	−16	16	
12	East Stirlingshire	22	1	10	11	26	47	−21	12	

Source: statto.com
Rules for classification: Teams finish equal if level on points. Points system: 2 points for a win, 1 point for a draw, 0 points for a loss
(C) Champions; (P) Promoted

== See also ==
- 1905–06 in Scottish football
