= 1965–66 Scottish Football League =

Scottish football season

Statistics of the Scottish Football League in season 1965–66.

== Scottish League Division One ==
Pos	Team	Pld	W	D	L	GF	GA	GD	Pts
1	Celtic	34	27	3	4	106	30	+76	57
2	Rangers	34	25	5	4	91	29	+62	55
3	Kilmarnock	34	20	5	9	73	46	+27	45
4	Dunfermline	34	19	6	9	94	55	+39	44
5	Dundee United	34	19	5	10	79	51	+28	43
6	Hibernian	34	16	6	12	81	55	+26	38
7	Hearts	34	13	12	9	56	48	+8	38
8	Aberdeen	34	15	6	13	61	54	+7	36
9	Dundee	34	14	6	14	61	61	0	34
10	Falkirk	34	15	1	18	48	72	−24	31
11	Clyde	34	13	4	17	62	64	−2	30
12	Partick Thistle	34	10	10	14	55	64	−9	30
13	Motherwell	34	12	4	18	52	69	−17	28
14	St Johnstone	34	9	8	17	58	81	−23	26
15	Stirling Albion	34	9	8	17	40	68	−28	26
16	St Mirren	34	9	4	21	44	82	−38	22
17	Morton (R)	34	8	5	21	42	84	−42	21
18	Hamilton Academical (R)	34	3	2	29	27	117	−90	8

Source: RSSSF
(R) Relegated

== Scottish League Division Two ==
Pos	Team	Pld	W	D	L	GF	GA	GD	Pts	Promotion or relegation
1	Ayr United	36	22	9	5	78	37	+41	53	Promotion to the 1966–67 First Division
2	Airdrieonians	36	22	6	8	107	56	+51	50	Promotion to the 1966–67 First Division
3	Queen of the South	36	18	11	7	73	46	+27	47	
4	East Fife	36	20	4	12	72	55	+17	44	
5	Raith Rovers	36	16	11	9	71	43	+28	43	
6	Arbroath	36	15	13	8	72	52	+20	43	
7	Albion Rovers	36	18	7	11	58	54	+4	43	
8	Alloa Athletic	36	14	10	12	65	65	0	38	
9	Montrose	36	15	7	14	67	63	+4	37	
10	Cowdenbeath	36	15	7	14	69	68	+1	37	
11	Berwick Rangers	36	12	11	13	69	58	+11	35	
12	Dumbarton	36	14	7	15	63	61	+2	35	
13	Queen's Park	36	13	7	16	62	65	−3	33	
14	Third Lanark	36	12	8	16	55	65	−10	32	
15	Stranraer	36	9	10	17	64	83	−19	28	
16	Brechin City	36	10	7	19	52	92	−40	27	
17	East Stirlingshire	36	9	5	22	59	91	−32	23	
18	Stenhousemuir	36	6	7	23	47	93	−46	19	
19	Forfar Athletic	36	7	3	26	61	120	−59	17	

== See also ==
- 1965–66 in Scottish football
