= 1930–31 Scottish Football League =

Scottish football season

Statistics of the Scottish Football League in season 1930–31.

== Scottish League Division One ==
Pos	Team	Pld	W	D	L	GF	GA	GD	Pts
1	Rangers	38	27	6	5	96	29	+67	60
2	Celtic	38	24	10	4	101	34	+67	58
3	Motherwell	38	24	8	6	102	42	+60	56
4	Partick Thistle	38	24	5	9	76	43	+33	53
5	Heart of Midlothian	38	19	6	13	90	63	+27	44
6	Aberdeen	38	17	7	14	79	63	+16	41
7	Cowdenbeath	38	17	7	14	58	65	−7	41
8	Dundee	38	17	5	16	65	63	+2	39
9	Airdrieonians	38	17	5	16	59	66	−7	39
10	Hamilton Academical	38	16	5	17	59	57	+2	37
11	Kilmarnock	38	15	5	18	59	60	−1	35
12	Clyde	38	15	4	19	60	87	−27	34
13	Queen's Park	38	13	7	18	71	72	−1	33
14	Falkirk	38	14	4	20	77	87	−10	32
15	St Mirren	38	11	8	19	49	72	−23	30
16	Morton	38	11	7	20	58	83	−25	29
17	Leith Athletic	38	8	11	19	51	85	−34	27
18	Ayr United	38	8	11	19	53	92	−39	27
19	Hibernian	38	9	7	22	49	81	−32	25
20	East Fife	38	8	4	26	45	113	−68	20

Source: "1930-1931 Division 1 - SPFL Archive". SPFL.

== Scottish League Division Two ==
Pos	Team	Pld	W	D	L	GF	GA	GD	Pts	Promotion or relegation
1	Third Lanark	38	27	7	4	107	42	+65	61	Promotion to the 1931–32 First Division
2	Dundee United	38	21	8	9	93	54	+39	50	Promotion to the 1931–32 First Division
3	Dunfermline Athletic	38	20	7	11	83	50	+33	47	
4	Raith Rovers	38	20	6	12	93	72	+21	46	
5	St Johnstone	38	19	6	13	76	61	+15	44	
6	Queen of the South	38	18	6	14	83	66	+17	42	
7	East Stirlingshire	38	17	7	14	85	74	+11	41	
8	Montrose	38	19	3	16	75	90	−15	41	
9	Albion Rovers	38	14	11	13	83	84	−1	39	
10	Dumbarton	38	15	8	15	73	72	+1	38	
11	St Bernard's	38	14	9	15	85	66	+19	37	
12	Forfar Athletic	38	15	6	17	80	84	−4	36	
13	Alloa Athletic	38	15	5	18	65	87	−22	35	
14	King's Park	38	14	6	18	78	70	+8	34	
15	Arbroath	38	15	4	19	83	94	−11	34	
16	Brechin City	38	13	7	18	52	84	−32	33	
17	Stenhousemuir	38	12	6	20	75	101	−26	30	
18	Armadale	38	13	2	23	74	99	−25	28	
19	Clydebank	38	10	2	26	61	108	−47	22	
20	Bo'ness	38	9	4	25	54	100	−46	22	

== See also ==
- 1930–31 in Scottish football
