= 1967–68 Scottish Football League =

Scottish football season

Statistics of the Scottish Football League in season 1967–68.

== Scottish League Division One ==
Pos	Team	Pld	W	D	L	GF	GA	GD	Pts	Qualification or relegation
1	Celtic	34	30	3	1	106	24	+82	63	1968-69 European Cup
2	Rangers	34	28	5	1	93	34	+59	61	
3	Hibernian	34	20	5	9	67	49	+18	45	
4	Dunfermline Athletic	34	17	5	12	64	41	+23	39	
5	Aberdeen	34	16	5	13	63	48	+15	37	
6	Morton	34	15	6	13	57	53	+4	36	
7	Kilmarnock	34	13	8	13	59	57	+2	34	
8	Clyde	34	15	4	15	55	55	0	34	
9	Dundee	34	13	7	14	62	59	+3	33	
10	Partick Thistle	34	12	7	15	51	67	−16	31	
11	Dundee United	34	10	11	13	53	72	−19	31	
12	Heart of Midlothian	34	13	4	17	56	61	−5	30	
13	Airdrieonians	34	10	9	15	45	58	−13	29	
14	St Johnstone	34	10	7	17	43	52	−9	27	
15	Falkirk	34	7	12	15	36	50	−14	26	
16	Raith Rovers	34	9	7	18	58	86	−28	25	
17	Motherwell	34	6	7	21	40	66	−26	19	
18	Stirling Albion	34	4	4	26	29	105	−76	12	

Source: "1967-1968 First Division - SPFL Archive". SPFL.

== Scottish League Division Two ==
Pos	Team	Pld	W	D	L	GF	GA	GD	Pts	Promotion or relegation
1	St Mirren	36	27	8	1	100	23	+77	62	Promotion to the 1968–69 First Division
2	Arbroath	36	24	5	7	87	34	+53	53	Promotion to the 1968–69 First Division
3	East Fife	36	21	7	8	71	47	+24	49	
4	Queen's Park	36	20	8	8	76	47	+29	48	
5	Ayr United	36	18	6	12	69	48	+21	42	
6	Queen of the South	36	16	6	14	73	57	+16	38	
7	Forfar Athletic	36	14	10	12	57	63	−6	38	
8	Albion Rovers	36	14	9	13	62	55	+7	37	
9	Clydebank	36	13	8	15	62	73	−11	34	
10	Dumbarton	36	11	11	14	63	74	−11	33	
11	Hamilton Academical	36	13	7	16	49	58	−9	33	
12	Cowdenbeath	36	12	8	16	57	62	−5	32	
13	Montrose	36	10	11	15	54	64	−10	31	
14	Berwick Rangers	36	13	4	19	34	54	−20	30	
15	East Stirlingshire	36	9	10	17	61	74	−13	28	
16	Brechin City	36	8	12	16	45	62	−17	28	
17	Alloa Athletic	36	11	6	19	42	69	−27	28	
18	Stranraer	36	8	4	24	41	80	−39	20	
19	Stenhousemuir	36	7	6	23	34	93	−59	20	

Source: "1967-1968 Second Division - SPFL Archive". SPFL.

== See also ==
- 1967–68 in Scottish football
