= 1972–73 Scottish Football League =

Scottish football season

Statistics of Scottish Football League in season 1972/1973.

== Scottish League Division One ==
Pos	Team	Pld	W	D	L	GF	GA	GD	Pts	Qualification or relegation
1	Celtic	34	26	5	3	93	28	+65	57	Champion
2	Rangers	34	26	4	4	74	30	+44	56	
3	Hibernian	34	19	7	8	74	33	+41	45	
4	Aberdeen	34	16	11	7	61	34	+27	43	
5	Dundee	34	17	9	8	68	43	+25	43	
6	Ayr United	34	16	8	10	50	51	−1	40	
7	Dundee United	34	17	5	12	56	51	+5	39	
8	Motherwell	34	11	9	14	38	48	−10	31	
9	East Fife	34	11	8	15	46	54	−8	30	
10	Heart of Midlothian	34	12	6	16	39	50	−11	30	
11	St Johnstone	34	10	9	15	52	67	−15	29	
12	Morton	34	10	8	16	47	53	−6	28	
13	Partick Thistle	34	10	8	16	40	53	−13	28	
14	Falkirk	34	7	12	15	38	56	−18	26	
15	Arbroath	34	9	8	17	39	63	−24	26	
16	Dumbarton	34	6	11	17	43	72	−29	23	
17	Kilmarnock	34	7	8	19	40	71	−31	22	Relegated to 1973–74 Second Division
18	Airdrieonians	34	4	8	22	34	75	−41	16	Relegated to 1973–74 Second Division

Source: Soccerbase and League Tables

== Scottish League Division Two ==
Pos	Team	Pld	W	D	L	GF	GA	GD	Pts	Promotion or relegation
1	Clyde	36	23	10	3	68	28	+40	56	Promotion to the 1973–74 First Division
2	Dunfermline Athletic	36	23	6	7	95	32	+63	52	Promotion to the 1973–74 First Division
3	Stirling Albion	36	19	9	8	70	39	+31	47	
4	Raith Rovers	36	19	9	8	73	42	+31	47	
5	St Mirren	36	19	7	10	79	50	+29	45	
6	Montrose	36	18	8	10	82	58	+24	44	
7	Cowdenbeath	36	14	10	12	57	53	+4	38	
8	Hamilton Academical	36	16	6	14	67	63	+4	38	
9	Berwick Rangers	36	16	5	15	45	54	−9	37	
10	Stenhousemuir	36	14	8	14	44	41	+3	36	
11	Queen of the South	36	13	8	15	45	52	−7	34	
12	Alloa Athletic	36	11	11	14	45	49	−4	33	
13	East Stirlingshire	36	12	8	16	52	69	−17	32	
14	Queen's Park	36	9	12	15	44	61	−17	30	
15	Stranraer	36	13	4	19	56	78	−22	30	
16	Forfar Athletic	36	10	9	17	38	66	−28	29	
17	Clydebank	36	9	6	21	48	72	−24	24	
18	Albion Rovers	36	5	8	23	35	83	−48	18	
19	Brechin City	36	5	4	27	46	99	−53	14	

Source: "1972-1973 Second Division - SPFL Archive". SPFL (in Malay).

== See also ==
- 1972–73 in Scottish football
