= 1902–03 Scottish Football League =

Scottish football season

Statistics of the Scottish Football League in season 1902–03.

== Scottish League Division One ==
Pos	Team	Pld	W	D	L	GF	GA	GD	Pts	Qualification or relegation
1	Hibernian (C)	22	16	5	1	48	18	+30	37	Champions
2	Dundee	22	13	5	4	31	12	+19	31	
3	Rangers	22	12	5	5	56	24	+32	29	
4	Heart of Midlothian	22	11	6	5	46	27	+19	28	
5	Celtic	22	8	10	4	36	30	+6	26	
6	St Mirren	22	7	8	7	39	40	−1	22	
7	Third Lanark	22	8	5	9	34	27	+7	21	
8	Partick Thistle	22	6	7	9	34	50	−16	19	
9	Kilmarnock	22	6	4	12	24	43	−19	16	
10	Queen's Park	22	5	5	12	33	48	−15	15	
11	Port Glasgow Athletic	22	3	5	14	26	49	−23	11	
12	Morton	22	2	5	15	22	55	−33	9	

Source: nozdrul.plus.com
(C) Champions

== Scottish League Division Two ==
Pos	Team	Pld	W	D	L	GF	GA	GD	Pts	Promotion or relegation
1	Airdrieonians (C, P)	22	15	5	2	43	19	+24	35	Promoted to the 1903–04 Scottish Division One
2	Motherwell (P)	22	12	4	6	44	35	+9	28	Promoted to the 1903–04 Scottish Division One
3	Ayr	22	12	3	7	34	34	0	27	
3	Leith Athletic	22	11	5	6	43	42	+1	27	
5	St Bernard's	22	12	2	8	45	32	+13	26	
6	Falkirk	22	8	7	7	39	37	+2	23	
6	Hamilton Academical	22	11	1	10	45	35	+10	23	
8	East Stirlingshire	22	9	3	10	46	41	+5	21	
9	Arthurlie	22	6	8	8	34	46	−12	20	
10	Abercorn	22	5	2	15	35	58	−23	12	
11	Clyde	22	2	7	13	22	40	−18	11	
11	Raith Rovers	22	3	5	14	34	55	−21	11	

Source: statto.com
Rules for classification: Teams finish equal if level on points. Points system: 2 points for a win, 1 point for a draw, 0 points for a loss
(C) Champions; (P) Promoted

== See also ==
- 1902–03 in Scottish football
