= 1963–64 Scottish Football League =

Scottish football season

Statistics of the Scottish Football League in season 1963–64.

== Scottish League Division One ==
Pos	Team	Pld	W	D	L	GF	GA	GR	Pts
1	Rangers (C)	34	25	5	4	85	31	2.742	55
2	Kilmarnock	34	22	5	7	77	40	1.925	49
3	Celtic	34	19	9	6	89	34	2.618	47
4	Hearts	34	19	9	6	74	40	1.850	47
5	Dunfermline	34	18	9	7	64	33	1.939	45
6	Dundee	34	20	5	9	94	50	1.880	45
7	Partick Thistle	34	15	5	14	55	54	1.019	35
8	Dundee United	34	13	8	13	65	49	1.327	34
9	Aberdeen	34	12	8	14	53	53	1.000	32
10	Hibernian	34	12	6	16	59	66	0.894	30
11	Motherwell	34	9	11	14	51	62	0.823	29
12	St Mirren	34	12	5	17	44	74	0.595	29
13	St Johnstone	34	11	6	17	54	70	0.771	28
14	Falkirk	34	11	6	17	54	84	0.643	28
15	Airdrieonians	34	11	4	19	52	97	0.536	26
16	Third Lanark	34	9	7	18	47	74	0.635	25
17	Queen of the South (R)	34	5	6	23	40	92	0.435	16
18	East Stirlingshire (R)	34	5	2	27	37	91	0.407	12

Source: RSSSF
(C) Champions; (R) Relegated

== Scottish League Division Two ==
Pos	Team	Pld	W	D	L	GF	GA	GD	Pts	Promotion or relegation
1	Morton	36	32	3	1	135	37	+98	67	Promotion to the 1964–65 First Division
2	Clyde	36	22	9	5	81	44	+37	53	Promotion to the 1964–65 First Division
3	Arbroath	36	20	6	10	79	46	+33	46	
4	East Fife	36	16	13	7	92	57	+35	45	
5	Montrose	36	19	6	11	79	57	+22	44	
6	Dumbarton	36	16	6	14	67	59	+8	38	
7	Queen's Park	36	17	4	15	57	54	+3	38	
8	Stranraer	36	16	6	14	71	73	−2	38	
9	Albion Rovers	36	12	12	12	67	71	−4	36	
10	Raith Rovers	36	15	5	16	70	61	+9	35	
11	Stenhousemuir	36	15	5	16	83	75	+8	35	
12	Berwick Rangers	36	10	10	16	68	84	−16	30	
13	Hamilton Academical	36	12	6	18	65	81	−16	30	
14	Ayr United	36	12	5	19	58	83	−25	29	
15	Brechin City	36	10	8	18	61	98	−37	28	
16	Alloa Athletic	36	11	5	20	64	92	−28	27	
17	Cowdenbeath	36	7	11	18	46	72	−26	25	
18	Forfar Athletic	36	6	8	22	57	104	−47	20	
19	Stirling Albion	36	6	8	22	47	99	−52	20	

== See also ==
- 1963–64 in Scottish football
