= 1913–14 Scottish Football League =

Scottish football season

Statistics of the Scottish Football League in season 1913–14.

== Scottish League Division One ==
| Pos | Team | Pld | W | D | L | GF | GA | GD | Pts |
|---|---|---|---|---|---|---|---|---|---|
| 1 | Celtic (C) | 38 | 30 | 5 | 3 | 81 | 14 | +67 | 65 |
| 2 | Rangers | 38 | 27 | 5 | 6 | 79 | 31 | +48 | 59 |
| 3 | Heart of Midlothian | 38 | 23 | 8 | 7 | 70 | 29 | +41 | 54 |
| 4 | Morton | 38 | 26 | 2 | 10 | 76 | 51 | +25 | 54 |
| 5 | Falkirk | 38 | 20 | 9 | 9 | 69 | 51 | +18 | 49 |
| 6 | Airdrieonians | 38 | 18 | 12 | 8 | 72 | 43 | +29 | 48 |
| 7 | Dundee | 38 | 19 | 5 | 14 | 64 | 53 | +11 | 43 |
| 8 | Third Lanark | 38 | 13 | 10 | 15 | 42 | 51 | −9 | 36 |
| 9 | Clyde | 38 | 11 | 11 | 16 | 44 | 44 | 0 | 33 |
| 10 | Ayr United | 38 | 13 | 7 | 18 | 56 | 72 | −16 | 33 |
| 11 | Raith Rovers | 38 | 13 | 6 | 19 | 56 | 57 | −1 | 32 |
| 12 | Kilmarnock | 38 | 11 | 9 | 18 | 48 | 68 | −20 | 31 |
| 13 | Hibernian | 38 | 12 | 6 | 20 | 58 | 75 | −17 | 30 |
| 14 | Aberdeen | 38 | 10 | 10 | 18 | 38 | 55 | −17 | 30 |
| 15 | Partick Thistle | 38 | 10 | 9 | 19 | 37 | 51 | −14 | 29 |
| 16 | Queen's Park | 38 | 10 | 9 | 19 | 52 | 84 | −32 | 29 |
| 17 | Motherwell | 38 | 11 | 6 | 21 | 46 | 65 | −19 | 28 |
| 18 | Hamilton Academical | 38 | 11 | 6 | 21 | 49 | 66 | −17 | 28 |
| 19 | Dumbarton | 38 | 10 | 7 | 21 | 45 | 87 | −42 | 27 |
| 20 | St Mirren | 38 | 8 | 6 | 24 | 38 | 73 | −35 | 22 |

Source: "1913-1914 Division 1 - SPFL Archive". SPFL.
(C) Champions

== Scottish League Division Two ==
| Pos | Team | Pld | W | D | L | GF | GA | GD | Pts |
|---|---|---|---|---|---|---|---|---|---|
| 1 | Cowdenbeath (C) | 22 | 13 | 5 | 4 | 34 | 17 | +17 | 31 |
| 2 | Albion Rovers | 22 | 10 | 7 | 5 | 38 | 33 | +5 | 27 |
| 3 | Dundee Hibernian | 22 | 11 | 4 | 7 | 36 | 31 | +5 | 26 |
| 3 | Dunfermline Athletic | 22 | 11 | 4 | 7 | 46 | 28 | +18 | 26 |
| 5 | Abercorn | 22 | 10 | 3 | 9 | 32 | 32 | 0 | 23 |
| 5 | St Johnstone | 22 | 9 | 5 | 8 | 48 | 38 | +10 | 23 |
| 7 | East Stirlingshire | 22 | 7 | 8 | 7 | 40 | 36 | +4 | 22 |
| 7 | St Bernard's | 22 | 8 | 6 | 8 | 39 | 31 | +8 | 22 |
| 9 | Arthurlie | 22 | 8 | 4 | 10 | 35 | 38 | −3 | 20 |
| 10 | Leith Athletic | 22 | 5 | 9 | 8 | 31 | 37 | −6 | 19 |
| 11 | Vale of Leven | 22 | 5 | 3 | 14 | 23 | 47 | −24 | 13 |
| 12 | Johnstone | 22 | 4 | 4 | 14 | 21 | 55 | −34 | 12 |

Source: statto.com
Rules for classification: Teams finish equal if level on points. Points system: 2 points for a win, 1 point for a draw, 0 points for a loss
(C) Champions

== See also ==
- 1913–14 in Scottish football
