= 1961–62 Scottish Football League =

Scottish football season

Statistics of the Scottish Football League in season 1961–62.

== Scottish League Division One ==
Pos	Team	Pld	W	D	L	GF	GA	GR	Pts	Qualification or relegation
1	Dundee (C)	34	25	4	5	80	46	1.739	54	Qualified for the European Cup
2	Rangers	34	22	7	5	84	31	2.710	51	Qualified for the Cup Winners' Cup
3	Celtic	34	19	8	7	81	37	2.189	46	Invited for the Inter-Cities Fairs Cup
4	Dunfermline Athletic	34	19	5	10	77	46	1.674	43	Invited for the Inter-Cities Fairs Cup
5	Kilmarnock	34	16	10	8	74	58	1.276	42	
6	Hearts	34	16	6	12	55	49	1.122	38	
7	Partick Thistle	34	16	3	15	60	55	1.091	35	
8	Hibernian	34	14	5	15	58	72	0.806	33	Invited for the Inter-Cities Fairs Cup
9	Motherwell	34	13	6	15	65	62	1.048	32	
10	Dundee United	34	13	6	15	70	71	0.986	32	
11	Third Lanark	34	13	5	16	59	60	0.983	31	
12	Aberdeen	34	10	9	15	60	73	0.822	29	
13	Raith Rovers	34	10	7	17	51	73	0.699	27	
14	Falkirk	34	11	4	19	45	68	0.662	26	
15	Airdrieonians	34	9	7	18	57	78	0.731	25	
16	St Mirren	34	10	5	19	52	80	0.650	25	
17	St Johnstone (R)	34	9	7	18	35	61	0.574	25	Relegated to the Second Division
18	Stirling Albion (R)	34	6	6	22	34	76	0.447	18	Relegated to the Second Division

Source: RSSSF
(C) Champions; (R) Relegated

== Scottish League Division Two ==
Pos	Team	Pld	W	D	L	GF	GA	GD	Pts	Promotion or relegation
1	Clyde	36	25	4	7	108	47	+61	54	Promotion to the 1962–63 First Division
2	Queen of the South	36	24	5	7	78	33	+45	53	Promotion to the 1962–63 First Division
3	Morton	36	19	6	11	78	64	+14	44	
4	Alloa Athletic	36	17	8	11	92	78	+14	42	
5	Montrose	36	15	11	10	63	50	+13	41	
6	Arbroath	36	17	7	12	66	59	+7	41	
7	Stranraer	36	14	11	11	61	62	−1	39	
8	Berwick Rangers	36	16	6	14	83	70	+13	38	
9	Ayr United	36	15	8	13	71	63	+8	38	
10	East Fife	36	15	7	14	60	59	+1	37	
11	East Stirlingshire	36	15	4	17	70	81	−11	34	
12	Queen's Park	36	12	9	15	64	62	+2	33	
13	Hamilton Academical	36	14	5	17	78	79	−1	33	
14	Cowdenbeath	36	11	9	16	65	77	−12	31	
15	Stenhousemuir	36	13	5	18	69	86	−17	31	
16	Forfar Athletic	36	11	8	17	68	76	−8	30	
17	Dumbarton	36	9	10	17	49	66	−17	28	
18	Albion Rovers	36	10	5	21	42	74	−32	25	
19	Brechin City	36	5	2	29	44	123	−79	12	

Source: "1961-1962 Second Division - SPFL Archive". SPFL.
