= 1933–34 Scottish Football League =

Scottish football season

Statistics of the Scottish Football League in season 1933–34.

== Scottish League Division One ==
Pos	Team	Pld	W	D	L	GF	GA	GD	Pts	Qualification or relegation
1	Rangers	38	30	6	2	118	41	+77	66	Champions
2	Motherwell	38	29	4	5	97	45	+52	62	
3	Celtic	38	18	11	9	78	53	+25	47	
4	Queen of the South	38	21	3	14	75	48	+27	45	
5	Aberdeen	38	18	8	12	90	57	+33	44	
6	Heart of Midlothian	38	17	10	11	86	59	+27	44	
7	Kilmarnock	38	17	9	12	73	64	+9	43	
8	Ayr United	38	16	10	12	87	92	−5	42	
9	St Johnstone	38	17	6	15	74	53	+21	40	
10	Falkirk	38	16	6	16	73	68	+5	38	
11	Hamilton Academical	38	15	8	15	65	79	−14	38	
12	Dundee	38	15	6	17	68	64	+4	36	
13	Partick Thistle	38	14	5	19	73	78	−5	33	
14	Clyde	38	10	11	17	56	70	−14	31	
15	Queen's Park	38	13	5	20	65	85	−20	31	
16	Hibernian	38	12	3	23	51	69	−18	27	
17	St Mirren	38	9	9	20	46	75	−29	27	
18	Airdrieonians	38	10	6	22	59	103	−44	26	
19	Third Lanark	38	8	9	21	62	103	−41	25	Relegated to Second Division
20	Cowdenbeath	38	5	5	28	58	118	−60	15	Relegated to Second Division

Source: RSSSF

== Scottish League Division Two ==
Pos	Team	Pld	W	D	L	GF	GA	GD	Pts	Promotion or relegation
1	Albion Rovers	34	20	5	9	74	47	+27	45	Promotion to the 1934–35 First Division
2	Dunfermline Athletic	34	20	4	10	90	52	+38	44	Promotion to the 1934–35 First Division
3	Arbroath	34	20	4	10	83	53	+30	44	
4	Stenhousemir	34	18	4	12	70	73	−3	40	
5	Morton	34	17	5	12	67	64	+3	39	
6	Dumbarton	34	17	3	14	67	68	−1	37	
7	King's Park	34	14	8	12	78	70	+8	36	
8	Raith Rovers	34	15	5	14	71	55	+16	35	
9	East Stirlingshire	34	14	7	13	65	74	−9	35	
10	St Bernard's	34	15	4	15	75	56	+19	34	
11	Forfar Athletic	34	13	7	14	77	71	+6	33	
12	Leith Athletic	34	12	8	14	63	60	+3	32	
13	East Fife	34	12	8	14	71	76	−5	32	
14	Brechin City	34	13	5	16	60	70	−10	31	
15	Alloa Athletic	34	11	9	14	55	68	−13	31	
16	Montrose	34	11	4	19	53	81	−28	26	
17	Dundee United	34	10	4	20	81	88	−7	24	
18	Edinburgh City	34	4	6	24	37	111	−74	14	

Source: "1933-1934 Division 2 - SPFL Archive". SPFL (in Malay).

== See also ==
- 1933–34 in Scottish football
