= 1957–58 Scottish Football League =

Scottish football season

Statistics of the Scottish Football League in season 1957–58.

== Scottish League Division One ==
Pos	Team	Pld	W	D	L	GF	GA	GR	Pts
1	Heart of Midlothian	34	29	4	1	132	29	4.552	62
2	Rangers	34	22	5	7	89	49	1.816	49
3	Celtic	34	19	8	7	84	47	1.787	46
4	Clyde	34	18	6	10	84	61	1.377	42
5	Kilmarnock	34	14	9	11	60	55	1.091	37
6	Partick Thistle	34	17	3	14	69	71	0.972	37
7	Raith Rovers	34	14	7	13	66	56	1.179	35
8	Motherwell	34	12	8	14	68	67	1.015	32
9	Hibernian	34	13	5	16	59	60	0.983	31
10	Falkirk	34	11	9	14	64	82	0.780	31
11	Dundee	34	13	5	16	49	65	0.754	31
12	Aberdeen	34	14	2	18	68	76	0.895	30
13	St Mirren	34	11	8	15	59	66	0.894	30
14	Third Lanark	34	13	4	17	69	88	0.784	30
15	Queen of the South	34	12	5	17	61	72	0.847	29
16	Airdrieonians	34	13	2	19	71	92	0.772	28
17	East Fife	34	10	3	21	45	88	0.511	23
18	Queen's Park	34	4	1	29	41	114	0.360	9

Source: RSSSF

== Scottish League Division Two ==
Pos	Team	Pld	W	D	L	GF	GA	GD	Pts	Promotion or relegation
1	Stirling Albion	36	25	5	6	105	48	+57	55	Promotion to the 1958–59 First Division
2	Dunfermline Athletic	36	24	5	7	120	42	+78	53	Promotion to the 1958–59 First Division
3	Arbroath	36	21	5	10	89	72	+17	47	
4	Dumbarton	36	20	4	12	92	57	+35	44	
5	Ayr United	36	18	6	12	98	81	+17	42	
6	Cowdenbeath	36	17	8	11	100	85	+15	42	
7	Brechin City	36	16	8	12	80	81	−1	40	
8	Alloa Athletic	36	15	9	12	88	78	+10	39	
9	Dundee United	36	12	9	15	81	77	+4	33	
10	Hamilton Academical	36	12	9	15	70	79	−9	33	
11	St Johnstone	36	12	9	15	67	85	−18	33	
12	Forfar Athletic	36	13	6	17	70	71	−1	32	
13	Morton	36	12	8	16	77	83	−6	32	
14	Montrose	36	13	6	17	55	72	−17	32	
15	East Stirlingshire	36	12	5	19	55	79	−24	29	
16	Stenhousemuir	36	12	5	19	68	98	−30	29	
17	Albion Rovers	36	12	5	19	53	79	−26	29	
18	Stranraer	36	9	7	20	54	83	−29	25	
19	Berwick Rangers	36	5	5	26	37	109	−72	15	

Source: "1957-1958 Second Division - SPFL Archive". SPFL.
