= 1964–65 Scottish Football League =

Scottish football season

Statistics of the Scottish Football League in season 1964–65.

== Scottish League Division One ==
Pos	Team	Pld	W	D	L	GF	GA	GAv	Pts	Qualification or relegation
1	Kilmarnock	34	22	6	6	62	33	1.879	50	Division Champions
2	Hearts	34	22	6	6	90	49	1.837	50	
3	Dunfermline Athletic	34	22	5	7	83	36	2.306	49	
4	Hibernian	34	21	4	9	75	47	1.596	46	
5	Rangers	34	18	8	8	78	35	2.229	44	
6	Dundee	34	15	10	9	86	63	1.365	40	
7	Clyde	34	17	6	11	64	58	1.103	40	
8	Celtic	34	16	5	13	76	57	1.333	37	
9	Dundee United	34	15	6	13	59	51	1.157	36	
10	Morton	34	13	7	14	54	54	1.000	33	
11	Partick Thistle	34	11	10	13	57	58	0.983	32	
12	Aberdeen	34	12	8	14	59	75	0.787	32	
13	St Johnstone	34	9	11	14	57	62	0.919	29	
14	Motherwell	34	10	8	16	45	54	0.833	28	
15	St Mirren	34	9	6	19	38	70	0.543	24	
16	Falkirk	34	7	7	20	43	85	0.506	21	
17	Airdrieonians	34	5	4	25	48	110	0.436	14	Relegated to the 1965–66 Second Division
18	Third Lanark	34	3	1	30	22	99	0.222	7	Relegated to the 1965–66 Second Division

Source: RSSSF

== Scottish League Division Two ==
Pos	Team	Pld	W	D	L	GF	GA	GD	Pts	Promotion or relegation
1	Stirling Albion	36	26	7	3	84	31	+53	59	Promotion to the 1965–66 First Division
2	Hamilton Academical	36	21	8	7	86	53	+33	50	Promotion to the 1965–66 First Division
3	Queen of the South	36	16	13	7	84	50	+34	45	
4	Queen's Park	36	17	9	10	57	41	+16	43	
5	E. S. Clydebank	36	15	10	11	64	50	+14	40	
6	Stranraer	36	17	6	13	74	64	+10	40	
7	Arbroath	36	13	13	10	56	51	+5	39	
8	Berwick Rangers	36	15	9	12	73	70	+3	39	
9	East Fife	36	15	7	14	78	77	+1	37	
10	Alloa Athletic	36	14	8	14	71	81	−10	36	
11	Albion Rovers	36	14	5	17	56	60	−4	33	
12	Cowdenbeath	36	11	10	15	55	62	−7	32	
13	Raith Rovers	36	9	14	13	54	61	−7	32	
14	Dumbarton	36	13	6	17	55	67	−12	32	
15	Stenhousemuir	36	11	8	17	49	74	−25	30	
16	Montrose	36	10	9	17	80	91	−11	29	
17	Forfar Athletic	36	9	7	20	63	89	−26	25	
18	Ayr United	36	9	6	21	49	67	−18	24	
19	Brechin City	36	6	7	23	53	102	−49	19	

== See also ==
- 1964–65 in Scottish football
