= 1968–69 Scottish Football League =

Scottish football season

Statistics of Scottish Football League in season 1968/1969.

== Scottish League Division One ==
Pos	Team	Pld	W	D	L	GF	GA	GD	Pts
1	Celtic	34	23	8	3	89	32	+57	54
2	Rangers	34	21	7	6	81	32	+49	49
3	Dunfermline Athletic	34	19	7	8	63	45	+18	45
4	Kilmarnock	34	15	14	5	50	32	+18	44
5	Dundee United	34	17	9	8	61	49	+12	43
6	St Johnstone	34	16	5	13	66	59	+7	37
7	Airdrieonians	34	13	11	10	46	44	+2	37
8	Heart of Midlothian	34	14	8	12	52	54	−2	36
9	Dundee	34	10	12	12	47	48	−1	32
10	Morton	34	12	8	14	58	68	−10	32
11	St Mirren	34	11	10	13	40	54	−14	32
12	Hibernian	34	12	7	15	60	59	+1	31
13	Clyde	34	9	13	12	35	50	−15	31
14	Partick Thistle	34	9	10	15	39	53	−14	28
15	Aberdeen	34	9	8	17	50	59	−9	26
16	Raith Rovers	34	8	5	21	45	67	−22	21
17	Falkirk	34	5	8	21	33	69	−36	18
18	Arbroath	34	5	6	23	41	82	−41	16

Source: "1968-1969 First Division - SPFL Archive". SPFL.

== Scottish League Division Two ==
Pos	Team	Pld	W	D	L	GF	GA	GD	Pts	Promotion or relegation
1	Motherwell	36	30	4	2	112	23	+89	64	Promotion to the 1969–70 First Division
2	Ayr United	36	23	7	6	82	31	+51	53	Promotion to the 1969–70 First Division
3	East Fife	36	21	6	9	82	45	+37	48	
4	Stirling Albion	36	21	6	9	67	40	+27	48	
5	Queen of the South	36	20	7	9	75	41	+34	47	
6	Forfar Athletic	36	18	7	11	71	56	+15	43	
7	Albion Rovers	36	19	5	12	60	56	+4	43	
8	Stranraer	36	17	7	12	57	45	+12	41	
9	East Stirlingshire	36	17	5	14	70	62	+8	39	
10	Montrose	36	15	4	17	59	71	−12	34	
11	Queen's Park	36	13	7	16	50	59	−9	33	
12	Cowdenbeath	36	12	5	19	54	67	−13	29	
13	Clydebank	36	6	15	15	52	67	−15	27	
14	Dumbarton	36	11	5	20	46	69	−23	27	
15	Hamilton Academical	36	8	8	20	37	72	−35	24	
16	Berwick Rangers	36	7	9	20	42	70	−28	23	
17	Brechin City	36	8	6	22	40	78	−38	22	
18	Alloa Athletic	36	7	7	22	45	79	−34	21	
19	Stenhousemuir	36	6	6	24	55	125	−70	18	

Source: "1968-1969 Second Division - SPFL Archive". SPFL.
