= 1984–85 Scottish Football League =

Scottish football season

Statistics of the Scottish Football League in season 1984–85.

== Scottish Premier Division ==
Pos	Team	Pld	W	D	L	GF	GA	GD	Pts	Qualification or relegation
1	Aberdeen (C)	36	27	5	4	89	26	+63	59	Qualification for the European Cup first round
2	Celtic	36	22	8	6	77	30	+47	52	Qualification for the Cup Winners' Cup first round
3	Dundee United	36	20	7	9	67	33	+34	47	Qualification for the UEFA Cup first round
4	Rangers	36	13	12	11	47	38	+9	38	Qualification for the UEFA Cup first round
5	St Mirren	36	17	4	15	51	56	−5	38	Qualification for the UEFA Cup first round
6	Dundee	36	15	7	14	48	50	−2	37	
7	Heart of Midlothian	36	13	5	18	47	64	−17	31	
8	Hibernian	36	10	7	19	38	61	−23	27	
9	Dumbarton (R)	36	6	7	23	29	64	−35	19	Relegation to the 1985–86 Scottish First Division
10	Morton (R)	36	5	2	29	29	100	−71	12	Relegation to the 1985–86 Scottish First Division

Source: Statto
Rules for classification: 1) points; 2) goal difference; 3) number of goals scored.
(C) Champions; (R) Relegated

== Scottish First Division ==
Pos	Team	Pld	W	D	L	GF	GA	GD	Pts	Promotion or relegation
1	Motherwell (C, P)	39	21	8	10	62	26	+36	50	Promotion to the Premier Division
2	Clydebank (P)	39	17	14	8	57	37	+20	48	Promotion to the Premier Division
3	Falkirk	39	19	7	13	65	54	+11	45	
4	Hamilton Academical	39	16	11	12	48	49	−1	43	
5	Airdrieonians	39	17	8	14	70	59	+11	42	
6	Forfar Athletic	39	14	13	12	54	49	+5	41	
7	Ayr United	39	15	9	15	57	52	+5	39	
8	Clyde	39	14	11	14	47	48	−1	39	
9	Brechin City	39	14	9	16	49	57	−8	37	
10	East Fife	39	12	12	15	55	56	−1	36	
11	Partick Thistle	39	13	9	17	50	55	−5	35	
12	Kilmarnock	39	12	10	17	42	61	−19	34	
13	Meadowbank Thistle (R)	39	11	10	18	50	66	−16	32	Relegation to the Second Division
14	St Johnstone (R)	39	10	5	24	51	79	−28	25	Relegation to the Second Division

Source: RSSSF and statto
Rules for classification: 1) points; 2) goal difference; 3) number of goals scored.
(C) Champions; (P) Promoted; (R) Relegated

== Scottish Second Division ==
Pos	Team	Pld	W	D	L	GF	GA	GD	Pts	Promotion
1	Montrose (C, P)	39	22	9	8	57	40	+17	53	Promotion to the First Division
2	Alloa Athletic (P)	39	20	10	9	58	40	+18	50	Promotion to the First Division
3	Dunfermline Athletic	39	17	15	7	61	36	+25	49	
4	Cowdenbeath	39	18	11	10	68	39	+29	47	
5	Stenhousemuir	39	15	15	9	45	43	+2	45	
6	Stirling Albion	39	15	13	11	62	47	+15	43	
7	Raith Rovers	39	18	6	15	69	57	+12	42	
8	Queen of the South	39	10	14	15	42	56	−14	34	
9	Albion Rovers	39	13	8	18	49	72	−23	34	
10	Queen's Park	39	12	9	18	48	55	−7	33	
11	Stranraer	39	13	6	20	52	67	−15	32	
12	East Stirlingshire	39	8	15	16	38	53	−15	31	
13	Berwick Rangers	39	8	12	19	36	49	−13	28	
14	Arbroath	39	9	7	23	35	66	−31	25	

Source: "1984-1985 Second Division - SPFL Archive". SPFL (in Malay).
Rules for classification: 1) points; 2) goal difference; 3) number of goals scored.
(C) Champions; (P) Promoted

== See also ==
- 1984–85 in Scottish football
