= 1901–02 Scottish Football League =

Scottish football season

Statistics of the Scottish Football League in season 1901–02.

== Scottish League Division One ==
Pos	Team	Pld	W	D	L	GF	GA	GD	Pts	Qualification or relegation
1	Rangers (C)	18	13	2	3	43	29	+14	28	Champions
2	Celtic	18	11	4	3	38	28	+10	26	
3	Heart of Midlothian	18	10	2	6	32	21	+11	22	
4	Third Lanark	18	7	5	6	30	26	+4	19	
5	St Mirren	18	8	3	7	29	28	+1	19	
6	Hibernian	18	6	4	8	36	24	+12	16	
7	Kilmarnock	18	5	6	7	21	25	−4	16	
8	Queen's Park	18	5	4	9	21	32	−11	14	
9	Dundee	18	4	5	9	16	31	−15	13	
10	Morton	18	1	5	12	18	40	−22	7	

Source: nozdrul.plus.com
(C) Champions

== Scottish League Division Two ==
Pos	Team	Pld	W	D	L	GF	GA	GD	Pts	Promotion or relegation
1	Port Glasgow Athletic (C, P)	22	14	4	4	75	31	+44	32	Promoted to the 1902–03 Scottish Division One
2	Partick Thistle (P)	22	13	4	5	50	29	+21	30	Promoted to the 1902–03 Scottish Division One
3	Motherwell	22	12	2	8	50	44	+6	26	
4	Airdrieonians	22	10	5	7	41	32	+9	25	
4	Hamilton Academical	22	11	3	8	45	40	+5	25	
6	St Bernard's	22	10	2	10	30	31	−1	22	
7	Ayr	22	8	5	9	27	33	−6	21	
7	Leith Athletic	22	9	3	10	34	38	−4	21	
9	East Stirlingshire	22	8	3	11	38	46	−8	19	
10	Arthurlie	22	6	5	11	32	42	−10	17	
11	Abercorn	22	4	5	13	27	59	−32	13	
11	Clyde	22	5	3	14	21	45	−24	13	

Source: statto.com
Rules for classification: Teams finish equal if level on points. Points system: 2 points for a win, 1 point for a draw, 0 points for a loss
(C) Champions; (P) Promoted

== See also ==
- 1901–02 in Scottish football
