= 1971–72 Scottish Football League =

Scottish football season

Statistics of Scottish Football League in season 1971/1972.

== Scottish League Division One ==
Pos	Team	Pld	W	D	L	GF	GA	GD	Pts	Qualification or relegation
1	Celtic	34	28	4	2	96	28	+68	60	Champion
2	Aberdeen	34	21	8	5	80	26	+54	50	
3	Rangers	34	21	2	11	71	38	+33	44	
4	Hibernian	34	19	6	9	62	34	+28	44	
5	Dundee	34	14	13	7	59	38	+21	41	
6	Heart of Midlothian	34	13	13	8	53	49	+4	39	
7	Partick Thistle	34	12	10	12	53	54	−1	34	
8	St Johnstone	34	12	8	14	52	58	−6	32	
9	Dundee United	34	12	7	15	55	70	−15	31	
10	Motherwell	34	11	7	16	49	69	−20	29	
11	Kilmarnock	34	11	6	17	49	64	−15	28	
12	Ayr United	34	9	10	15	40	58	−18	28	
13	Morton	34	10	7	17	46	52	−6	27	
14	Falkirk	34	10	7	17	44	60	−16	27	
15	Airdrieonians	34	7	12	15	44	76	−32	26	
16	East Fife	34	5	15	14	34	61	−27	25	
17	Clyde	34	7	10	17	33	66	−33	24	Relegated to 1972–73 Second Division
18	Dunfermline Athletic	34	7	9	18	31	50	−19	23	Relegated to 1972–73 Second Division

Source: Soccerbase and League Tables

== Scottish League Division Two ==
Pos	Team	Pld	W	D	L	GF	GA	GD	Pts	Promotion or relegation
1	Dumbarton	36	24	4	8	89	51	+38	52	Promotion to the 1972–73 First Division
2	Arbroath	36	22	8	6	71	41	+30	52	Promotion to the 1972–73 First Division
3	Stirling Albion	36	21	8	7	75	37	+38	50	
4	St Mirren	36	24	2	10	84	47	+37	50	
5	Cowdenbeath	36	19	10	7	69	28	+41	48	
6	Stranraer	36	18	8	10	70	62	+8	44	
7	Queen of the South	36	17	9	10	56	38	+18	43	
8	East Stirlingshire	36	17	7	12	60	58	+2	41	
9	Clydebank	36	14	11	11	60	52	+8	39	
10	Montrose	36	15	6	15	73	54	+19	36	
11	Raith Rovers	36	13	8	15	56	56	0	34	
12	Queen's Park	36	12	9	15	47	61	−14	33	
13	Berwick Rangers	36	14	4	18	53	50	+3	32	
14	Stenhousemuir	36	10	8	18	41	58	−17	28	
15	Brechin City	36	8	7	21	41	79	−38	23	
16	Alloa Athletic	36	9	4	23	41	75	−34	22	
17	Forfar Athletic	36	6	9	21	32	84	−52	21	
18	Albion Rovers	36	7	6	23	36	61	−25	20	
19	Hamilton Academical	36	4	8	24	31	93	−62	16	

Source: "1971-1972 Second Division - SPFL Archive". SPFL.

== See also ==
- 1971–72 in Scottish football
