= 1932–33 Scottish Football League =

Scottish football season

Statistics of the Scottish Football League in season 1932–33.

== Scottish League Division One ==
Pos	Team	Pld	W	D	L	GF	GA	GD	Pts
1	Rangers	38	26	10	2	113	43	+70	62
2	Motherwell	38	27	5	6	114	53	+61	59
3	Heart of Midlothian	38	21	8	9	84	51	+33	50
4	Celtic	38	20	8	10	75	44	+31	48
5	St Johnstone	38	17	10	11	70	55	+15	44
6	Aberdeen	38	18	6	14	85	58	+27	42
7	St Mirren	38	18	6	14	73	60	+13	42
8	Hamilton Academical	38	18	6	14	90	78	+12	42
9	Queen's Park	38	17	7	14	78	79	−1	41
10	Partick Thistle	38	17	6	15	75	55	+20	40
11	Falkirk	38	15	6	17	70	70	0	36
12	Clyde	38	15	5	18	69	75	−6	35
13	Third Lanark	38	14	7	17	70	80	−10	35
14	Kilmarnock	38	13	9	16	72	86	−14	35
15	Dundee	38	12	9	17	60	77	−17	33
16	Ayr United	38	13	4	21	62	95	−33	30
17	Cowdenbeath	38	10	5	23	65	111	−46	25
18	Airdrieonians	38	10	3	25	55	102	−47	23
19	Morton	38	6	9	23	49	97	−48	21
20	East Stirlingshire	38	7	3	28	55	115	−60	17

Source: RSSSF

== Scottish League Division Two ==
Pos	Team	Pld	W	D	L	GF	GA	GD	Pts	Promotion or relegation
1	Hibernian	37	28	4	5	99	33	+66	60	Promotion to the 1933–34 First Division
2	Queen of the South	35	21	9	5	103	59	+44	51	Promotion to the 1933–34 First Division
3	Dunfermline Athletic	35	21	7	7	98	45	+53	49	
4	Stenhousemir	36	20	6	10	74	62	+12	46	
5	Albion Rovers	35	20	2	13	85	59	+26	42	
6	Raith Rovers	36	18	4	14	90	69	+21	40	
7	Alloa Athletic	37	16	6	15	70	60	+10	38	
8	Dumbarton	36	16	6	14	77	69	+8	38	
9	East Fife	35	16	4	15	93	72	+21	36	
10	St Bernard's	35	14	6	15	73	67	+6	34	
11	King's Park	34	13	8	13	85	80	+5	34	
12	Arbroath	34	14	5	15	65	62	+3	33	
13	Dundee United	35	14	4	17	68	72	−4	32	
14	Forfar Athletic	35	13	4	18	71	89	−18	30	
15	Brechin City	36	12	4	20	71	101	−30	28	
16	Leith Athletic	36	10	6	20	46	85	−39	26	
17	Montrose	35	9	5	21	66	90	−24	23	
18	Edinburgh City	36	5	4	27	44	138	−94	14	
19	Armadale	0	0	0	0	0	0	0	0	Expelled (Note: Armadale & Bo'ness were expelled for failing to meet match guarantees; their records were expunged.)
20	Bo'ness	0	0	0	0	0	0	0	0	Expelled

== See also ==
- 1932–33 in Scottish football
