= 1900–01 Scottish Football League =

Scottish football season

Statistics of the Scottish Football League in season 1900–01.

== Scottish League Division One ==
Pos	Team	Pld	W	D	L	GF	GA	GD	Pts	Qualification or relegation
1	Rangers (C)	20	17	1	2	60	25	+35	35	Champions
2	Celtic	20	13	3	4	49	28	+21	29	
3	Hibernian	20	9	7	4	29	22	+7	25	
4	Morton	20	9	3	8	40	40	0	21	
5	Kilmarnock	20	7	4	9	35	47	−12	18	
5	Third Lanark	20	6	6	8	20	29	−9	18	
7	Dundee	20	6	5	9	36	35	+1	17	
7	Queen's Park	20	7	3	10	33	37	−4	17	
9	St Mirren	20	5	6	9	33	43	−10	16	
10	Heart of Midlothian	20	5	4	11	22	30	−8	14	
11	Partick Thistle (R)	20	4	2	14	28	49	−21	10	Relegated to the 1901–02 Scottish Division Two

Source: "1900-1901 Division 1 - SPFL Archive". SPFL.
Rules for classification: Teams finish equal if level on points. Points system: 2 points for a win, 1 point for a draw, 0 points for a loss
(C) Champions; (R) Relegated

== Scottish League Division Two ==
Pos	Team	Pld	W	D	L	GF	GA	GD	Pts
1	St Bernard's (C)	18	11	4	3	42	26	+16	26
2	Airdrieonians	18	11	1	6	43	32	+11	23
3	Abercorn	18	9	3	6	37	33	+4	21
4	Clyde	18	9	2	7	43	35	+8	20
4	Port Glasgow Athletic	18	10	0	8	45	43	+2	20
6	Ayr	18	9	0	9	32	34	−2	18
7	East Stirlingshire	18	7	3	8	34	39	−5	17
8	Hamilton Academical	18	4	4	10	41	49	−8	12
8	Leith Athletic	18	5	2	11	22	32	−10	12
10	Motherwell	18	4	3	11	26	42	−16	11

Source: statto.com
Rules for classification: Teams finish equal if level on points. Points system: 2 points for a win, 1 point for a draw, 0 points for a loss
(C) Champions

== See also ==
- 1900–01 in Scottish football
