= 1925–26 Dumbarton F.C. season =

Dumbarton
1925–1926 season
- Manager: Donald Colman
- Stadium: Boghead Park, Dumbarton
- Scottish League Division Two: 11th
- Scottish Cup: Fourth Round
- Top goalscorer: League: McLardie (11); All: Cameron/ McLardie (11)

The 1925–26 season was the 49th Scottish football season in which Dumbarton competed at national level, entering the Scottish Football League and the Scottish Cup. In addition Dumbarton played in the Dumbartonshire Cup and the Dumbartonshire Charity Cup.

== Scottish League ==
The fourth season in a row in the Second Division did not start well, and with only 3 wins recorded by the beginning of December any hopes of promotion had long gone. In the end however Dumbarton finished 11th out of 20 with 38 points - 21 behind champions Dunfermline Athletic.

15 August 1925 League	Dumbarton	3–0	Bo'ness	Boghead Park
	Russell 8'; Sharp 21'; Travers 70'			Attendance: 3,000; Referee: W Addison

22 August 1925 League	King's Park	1–1	Dumbarton	Forthbank Park
	Lamond		Sharp	Attendance: 3,000; Referee: J Aitken

29 August 1925 League	Dumbarton	1–1	Clyde	Boghead Park
	McLardie 84'		Malone 44'	Attendance: 4,000; Referee: R Morrison

5 September 1925 League	Nithsdale Wanderers	5–1	Dumbarton	Crawick Holm
	McConnel; McManus 70'; Wilson		Travers 5'	Referee: W Holborn

12 September 1925 League	Dumbarton	0–0	Arthurlie	Boghead Park
				Attendance: 3,000

19 September 1925 League	Arbroath	6–0	Dumbarton	Gayfield Park
	Hardie 43', 85'; Slavin 61'; Black 65'; Farquhar 67'; Kane 77'			Attendance: 3,500; Referee: J Archer

26 September 1925 League	Dumbarton	1–1	Ayr United	Boghead Park
	McLardie 80'		Paton 65'	Attendance: 3,000

3 October 1925 League	St Bernard's	3–2	Dumbarton	Royal Gymnasium Ground
	Simpson; Main		McLardie; Russell	Attendance: 3,000; Referee: W Addison

10 October 1925 League	Bathgate	1–4	Dumbarton	Mill Park, Bathgate
	Brunton 8'		Russell 1'; Swan 20'; Broadley 44'; McGrath 50'	Attendance: 3,000; Referee: A Scott

17 October 1925 League	East Fife	6–1	Dumbarton	Bayview Park, Methil
	Wright; Wilson (pen.); Nairn; Weir		McGrath	Attendance: 3,000; Referee: J Kilbride

24 October 1925 League	Dumbarton	3–0	East Stirling	Boghead Park
	McGrath 15', 25'; McLardie 48'			Attendance: 2,000; Referee: G Robertson

31 October 1925 League	Armadale	6–2	Dumbarton	Volunteer Park, Armadale
	Grove 17' 88'; Trialist 39'; Morgan		McDonald; McGrath	Attendance: 2,000; Referee: F Galloway

7 November 1925 League	Dumbarton	1–1	Third Lanark	Boghead Park
	McLardie 80'		Rutherford	Attendance: 3,000

14 November 1925 League	Broxburn United	1–1	Dumbarton	Sports Park
	Wardrope 75'		Russell 48'	Attendance: 1,000; Referee: J Roberts

21 November 1925 League	Dumbarton	1–1	Stenhousemuir	Boghead Park
	McDonald, W 40'		Taylor 75'	Attendance: 2,000; Referee: A Scott

28 November 1925 League	Dunfermline Athletic	1–0	Dumbarton	East End Park
	Sutton 47'			Attendance: 3,000; Referee: A Leishman

5 December 1925 League	Dumbarton	0–1	Albion Rovers	Boghead Park
			Brant 65'	Attendance: 2,000; Referee: G Robertson

12 December 1925 League	Alloa Athletic	0–2	Dumbarton	Recreation Park, Alloa
			Swan 15'; McLardie 65'

19 December 1925 League	Dumbarton	4–1	King's Park	Boghead Park
	Mair mcLardie 44'; McGrath		Banks	Referee: W Addison

26 December 1925 League	Ayr United	1–2	Dumbarton	Somerset Park
	Fleming		Harvie 83'

1 January 1926 League	Dumbarton	1–0	Arbroath	Boghead Park
	Russell 65'			Attendance: 2,000; Referee: A Leishman

2 January 1926 League	Arthurlie	1–2	Dumbarton	Dunterlie Park
	Fyfe		Cameron; McLardie 50'	Referee: J Kilbride

4 January 1926 League	Dumbarton	2–2	Nithsdale Wanderers	Boghead Park
	McLardie (o.g.)		Goal	Attendance: 3,000

9 January 1926 League	Third Lanark	1–2	Dumbarton	Cathkin Park
	Blair 44'		Harvie 5'; Swan 55'	Attendance: 5,000

16 January 1926 League	Dumbarton	2–1	East Fife	Boghead Park
	Cameron 12', 47'		Wright 2'	Attendance: 2,000; Referee: W Morrison

30 January 1926 League	Albion Rovers	11–1	Dumbarton	Cliftonhill
	McKenna 5'; Brant; Walker; Geddes; Hutcheson		Swan	Attendance: 3,000; Referee: N McMillan

13 February 1926 League	Queen of the South	1–3	Dumbarton	Palmerston Park
	Gilmour 44' (pen.)		Russell 14'; Cameron 15'

17 February 1926 League	Dumbarton	2–0	Armadale	Boghead Park
	Carlow 44'; Harvey 57'			Attendance: 1,000

24 February 1926 League	Dumbarton	5–1	Broxburn United	Boghead Park
	Cameron 8'; McLardie 35' (pen.)		Davies 10'	Referee: J Archer

27 February 1926 League	Bo'ness	1–0	Dumbarton	Newtown Park, Bo'ness
	Kennedy 77'			Attendance: 2,000; Referee: C Ritchie

10 March 1926 League	Dumbarton	1–3	Dunfermline Athletic	Boghead Park
	Murray 86'		Skinner 5', 10'; Stein 57'

13 March 1926 League	Dumbarton	1–3	East Stirling	Boghead Park
	McGrath 17'		Bickerstaffe 18'; McKay 35'; Docherty 60'	Attendance: 3,000; Referee: A Williamson

20 March 1926 League	Dumbarton	1–0	St Bernard's	Boghead Park
	Russell			Referee: A Scott

27 March 1926 League	Dumbarton	0–5	Bathgate	Boghead Park
			Scoular 1', 22', 75', 89'; McKinlay 49'	Referee: J Archer

3 April 1926 League	Dumbarton	1–1	Queen of the South	Boghead Park
	Hosie		Wilson

10 April 1926 League	Stenhousemuir	4–0	Dumbarton	Ochilview Park
	Henderson 8'; McCaig 59'; Taylor 60'			Attendance: 1,000; Referee: N McMillan

17 April 1926 League	Clyde	6–0	Dumbarton	Shawfield
	Hood; Gibson (pen.); Crawford; Ballantyne; Wallace			Attendance: 8,000

24 April 1926 League	Dumbarton	0–0	Alloa Athletic	Boghead Park

== Scottish Cup ==
In the Scottish Cup, Dumbarton reached the fourth round before losing out to Celtic.

23 January 1926 Cup R1	Dumbarton	1–1	Buckie Thistle	Boghead Park
	Harvey		McIntosh 44'	Attendance: 1,200; Referee: W Addison

26 January 1926 Cup R1r	Buckie Thistle	1–2 (a.e.t.)	Dumbarton	Victoria Park, Buckie
	Cowie		Swan	Attendance: 2,500; Referee: P Craigmyle

6 February 1926 Cup R2	Forfar Athletic	2–2 (a.e.t.)	Dumbarton	Station Park, Forfar
	Osborne 80'; Connon 85'		Swan; Russell	Attendance: 1,500

10 February 1926 Cup R2r	Dumbarton	4–1	Forfar Athletic	Boghead Park
	Harvie 46'; Peters 52'; Swan 60'; Cameron 80'		Gilmour 44' (pen.)	Attendance: 2,000; Referee: J Rowe

20 February 1926 Cup R3	Dumbarton	3–0	Clyde	Boghead Park
	Harvie 5'; Cameron 20'; Swan 43'			Attendance: 8,500; Referee: J Martin

6 March 1926 Cup R4	Celtic	6–1	Dumbarton	Celtic Park
	McLean 15', 70'; McStay 35' (pen.); McGrory 60', 86'; Thomson 83'		Cameron 75'	Attendance: 19,000; Referee: T Small

== Dumbartonshire Cup ==
Dumbarton were runners-up in the Dumbartonshire Cup, losing to Helesburgh in the final.

Semi Final	Vale of Leven	Walk Over	Dumbarton	Millburn Park

28 April 1926 Final	Helensburgh	3–1	Dumbarton	Helensburgh
	Wilson; Turner; Smillie		Murray	Attendance: 1,500

== Dumbartonshire Charity Cup ==
Dumbarton were also runners-up in the Charity Cup, losing to Clydebank in the final.

9 May 1926 Semi Final	Helensburgh	0–1	Dumbarton	Helensburgh
			Goal

16 May 1926 Final	Clydebank	4–1	Dumbarton	Clydeholm Park
	Goal		Goal

== Friendly ==
A benefit match was played at the beginning of the season against Clydebank.

26 August 1925 Benefit	Clydebank	8–1	Dumbarton	Clydeholm Park
	Goal		Malloy

== Player statistics ==
=== Squad ===
No.	Pos	Nat	Player	Total		Second Division		Scottish Cup	
No.	Pos	Nat	Player	Apps	Goals	Apps	Goals	Apps	Goals
	GK	(Scotland) SCO	Harry Britton	18	0	15	0	3	0
	GK	(Scotland) SCO	Albert Ferguson	23	0	20	0	3	0
	GK	(Scotland) SCO	Archibald McNish	3	0	3	0	0	0
	DF	(Scotland) SCO	John Anderson	2	0	2	0	0	0
	DF	(Scotland) SCO	William Gibson	40	0	34	0	6	0
	DF	(Scotland) SCO	Sandy Hunter	1	0	0	0	1	0
	DF	(Scotland) SCO	Joseph McDonald	3	0	0	0	3	0
	DF	(Scotland) SCO	William Murray	20	1	20	1	0	0
	DF	(Scotland) SCO	Adam Swanson	1	0	0	0	1	0
	DF	(Scotland) SCO	James Warden	30	0	29	0	1	0
	MF	(Scotland) SCO	David Broadley	36	1	31	1	5	0
	MF	(Scotland) SCO	Robert Hosie	19	1	18	1	1	0
	MF	(Scotland) SCO	Andrew Mair	33	1	27	1	6	0
	MF	(Scotland) SCO	Thomas McKinney	4	0	4	0	0	0
	FW	(Scotland) SCO	Ronald Cameron	18	11	13	8	5	3
	FW	(Scotland) SCO	Francis Carlow	4	1	3	1	1	0
	FW	(Scotland) SCO	Robert Dennett	35	0	29	0	6	0
	FW	(Scotland) SCO	John Harvie	28	7	22	4	6	3
	FW	(Scotland) SCO	William McDonald	18	2	18	2	0	0
	FW	(Scotland) SCO	John McGrath	23	7	21	7	2	0
	FW	(Scotland) SCO	Archibald McLardie	42	11	36	11	6	0
	FW	(Scotland) SCO	Martin Peters	1	1	0	0	1	1
	FW	(Scotland) SCO	John Russell	36	9	32	8	4	1
	FW	(Scotland) SCO	Robert Sharp	6	2	6	2	0	0
	FW	(Scotland) SCO	John Swan	33	9	28	4	5	5
	FW	(Scotland) SCO	Martin Travers	5	2	5	2	0	0
	FW	(Scotland) SCO	Trialist	2	0	2	0	0	0

=== Transfers ===
==== Players in ====
Player	From	Date
(Scotland) Martin Travers	(Scotland) Chryston Ahthletic	4 Aug 1925
(Scotland) William McDonald	(Scotland) Dumbarton Academy	6 Aug 1925
(Scotland) Robert Sharp	(Scotland) Vale of Leven Juniors	7 Aug 1925
(Scotland) William Murray	(Scotland) Dumbarton Academy	12 Aug 1925
(Scotland) Robert Hosie	(Scotland) Vale of Leven	14 Aug 1925
(Scotland) John Swan	(Scotland) Clydebank	22 Sep 1925
(Scotland) John McGrath	(Scotland) Motherwell	8 Oct 1925
(Scotland) John Anderson	(England) Barnsley	17 Nov 1925
(Scotland) Ronald Cameron	(United States) Bethlehem Steel	1 Dec 1925
(Scotland) John Harvie	(Scotland) Johnstone	1 Dec 1925
(Scotland) Adam Swanson	(Scotland) Clydebank (loan)	25 Jan 1926
(Scotland) Harry Britton	(Scotland) Vale of Leven	8 Feb 1926
(Scotland) Joseph McDonald	(Scotland) Cowdenbeath	1 Feb 1926
(Scotland) Martin Peters	(Scotland) Helensburgh (loan)	5 Feb 1926
(Scotland) Alex Hunter	(Scotland) Hamilton (loan)	5 Mar 1926
(Scotland) Thomas McKinney	(Scotland) Dumbarton Harp	1 Apr 1926

==== Players out ====
Player	To	Date
(Scotland) William Hyslop	(Scotland) Vale of Leven	14 May 1925
(Scotland) Ronald Cameron	(United States) Bethlehem Steel	24 Aug 1925
(Scotland) Philip Kennedy	(Scotland) Bo'ness	8 Sep 1925
(Scotland) Ronald Cameron	(England) Huddersfield Town	13 Mar 1926
(Scotland) Thomas Love	(England) Luton	
(Scotland) Colin McKenzie	(Scotland) Vale of Leven	

In addition William Middleton played his last game in Dumbarton 'colours'.
