= 1921–22 Dundee Hibernian F.C. season =

Dundee Hibernian
1921–22 season
- Manager: Pat Reilly
- Stadium: Tannadice Park
- Scottish Football League Second Division: 19th W10 D8 L20 F47 A65 P28
- Scottish Cup: Round 1

The 1920–21 Dundee Hibernian F.C. season was the 13th edition of Dundee Hibernian F.C. annual football play in Scottish Football League Second Division from 1 July 1921 to 30 June 1922.

== Match results ==
Dundee Hibernian played a total of 39 matches during the 1921–22 season, ranked 19th.

=== Legend ===
Win
Draw
Loss

All results are written with Dundee Hibernian's score first. Own goals in italics

=== Second Division ===
| Date | Opponent | Venue | Result | Attendance | Scorers |
|---|---|---|---|---|---|
| 20 August 1921 | Bo'ness | H | 2-2 | 4,000 | |
| 27 August 1921 | Johnstone | A | 2-2 | 2,000 | |
| 3 September 1921 | East Stirlingshire | H | 2-0 | 5,000 | |
| 10 September 1921 | St Johnstone | H | 3-1 | 6,000 | |
| 17 September 1921 | Armadale | A | 1-3 | 2,000 | |
| 24 September 1921 | Bathgate | A | 2-4 | 3,000 | |
| 1 October 1921 | Clackmannan | H | 7-1 | 6,000 | |
| 8 October 1921 | Dunfermline Athletic | A | 4-1 | 5,000 | |
| 15 October 1921 | Forfar Athletic | H | 1-0 | 4,000 | |
| 22 October 1921 | Broxburn United | A | 0-3 | 3,000 | |
| 29 October 1921 | King's Park | H | 0-1 | 4,000 | |
| 5 November 1921 | East Fife | A | 0-0 | 3,000 | |
| 12 November 1921 | Arbroath | H | 1-2 | 5,500 | |
| 19 November 1921 | St Bernard's | A | 0-2 | 1,000 | |
| 26 November 1921 | Lochgelly United | H | 4-0 | 1,500 | |
| 3 December 1921 | King's Park | A | 2-0 | 3,000 | |
| 10 December 1921 | Alloa Athletic | H | 0-4 | 6,000 | |
| 17 December 1921 | Stenhousemuir | H | 1-1 | 3,000 | |
| 24 December 1921 | Lochgelly United | A | 1-1 | 1,000 | |
| 31 December 1921 | Vale of Leven | H | 0-2 | 2,000 | |
| 2 January 1922 | St Johnstone | A | 1-3 | 6,000 | |
| 3 January 1922 | Arbroath | A | 0-2 | 4,000 | |
| 7 January 1922 | Cowdenbeath | H | 2-6 | 4,000 | |
| 14 January 1922 | Bo'ness | A | 0-1 | 2,000 | |
| 4 February 1922 | Vale of Leven | A | 2-2 | 1,000 | |
| 11 February 1922 | Johnstone | H | 0-1 | 2,000 | |
| 15 February 1922 | Bathgate | H | 1-2 | 1,000 | |
| 18 February 1922 | Cowdenbeath | A | 0-3 | 2,000 | |
| 25 February 1922 | Forfar Athletic | A | 0-0 | 2,000 | |
| 4 March 1922 | St Bernard's | H | 2-0 | 2,000 | |
| 11 March 1922 | Stenhousemuir | A | 0-3 | 2,000 | |
| 18 March 1922 | Alloa Athletic | A | 0-3 | 4,000 | |
| 25 March 1922 | Broxburn United | H | 1-0 | 3,000 | |
| 1 April 1922 | East Stirlingshire | A | 2-3 | 2,000 | |
| 8 April 1922 | Dunfermline Athletic | H | 1-0 | 1,000 | |
| 10 April 1922 | East Fife | H | 0-1 | 500 | |
| 22 April 1922 | Clackmannan | A | 1-2 | 9,000 | |
| 29 April 1922 | Armadale | H | 4-1 | 500 | |

=== Scottish Cup ===
| Date | Rd | Opponent | Venue | Result | Attendance | Scorers |
|---|---|---|---|---|---|---|
| 28 January 1922 | R1 | Broxburn United | H | 0-2 | 5,000 | |
