= List of Dundee United F.C. results by opponent =

Dundee United are a Scottish professional association football club based in the city of Dundee. The club compete in the Scottish Championship, the second tier of the SPFL structure. The club was formed in 1909.

== Key ==
- The records include the results of matches played in the SPFL, Scottish Cup, Scottish League Cup and Scottish Challenge Cup.
- The records exclude European matches. All records are from domestic competitions only.
- The records do not include matches played in regional tournaments, such as the Forfarshire Cup.
- Wartime matches are regarded as unofficial and are excluded.
- Matches played at neutral venues are included in the 'Total' section only
- The season given as the "last" designates the most recent season to have included a match between Dundee United and that side.
- P = matches played; W = matches won; D = matches drawn; L = matches lost; F = goals for; A = goals conceded; Winning% = percentage of total matches won; Unbeaten% = percentage of total matches not lost
- Denotes clubs in the same division as Dundee United in the 2025–26 season.
- Denotes current SPFL clubs not in the same division as United.
- Denotes current non league clubs.
- Denotes clubs which are now defunct.

== All–time statistics ==
As of 27 April 2026^{[a]}^{[b]}^{[c]}

Club	P	W	D	L	P	W	D	L	P	W	D	L	F	A	Winning%	Unbeaten%	Last	Notes
Club	(Tannadice)				(Away)				(Total)						Winning%	Unbeaten%	Last	Notes
Abercorn	5	4	1	0	5	1	0	4	10	5	1	4	17	16	50.00	60.00	1914–15	
Aberdeen	123	44	37	42	118	32	31	55	257	83	73	101	318	357	32.30	60.70	2025–26	
Aberdeen University	1	1	0	0	0	0	0	0	1	1	0	0	5	1	100.00	100.00	1924–25	
Airdrieonians (1878)	42	23	8	11	41	9	12	20	83	32	20	31	163	151	38.55	62.65	1999–00	(Note: Airdrieonians were liquidated in 2002. A new club known as Airdrie United was formed in 2002 and reverted to Airdrionians name in 2013.)
Airdrieonians	4	3	0	1	6	5	1	0	10	8	1	1	18	5	80.00	90.00	2023–24	
Albion Rovers	30	19	4	7	29	6	4	19	59	25	8	26	123	107	42.37	55.93	1977–78	
Alloa	36	23	7	6	40	14	11	15	77	38	18	21	171	123	49.35	72.73	2019–20	
Arbroath	38	23	8	7	37	18	5	14	75	41	13	21	180	124	54.67	72.00	2023–24	
Arbroath Athletic	0	0	0	0	1	1	0	0	1	1	0	0	7	0	100.00	100.00	1926–27	
Armadale	6	5	1	0	7	3	1	3	13	8	2	3	35	14	61.53	76.92	1932–33	
Arthurlie	8	6	2	0	8	2	1	5	16	8	3	5	38	28	50.00	68.75	1928–29	
Ayr Utd	54	35	7	12	52	13	14	25	106	48	21	37	197	182	45.28	65.09	2025–26	
Bathgate	4	3	0	1	4	1	1	2	8	4	1	3	15	15	50.00	62.50	1927–28	(Note: Would re-emerge in junior football as Bathgate Thistle.)
Beith	1	1	0	0	0	0	0	0	1	1	0	0	3	1	100.00	100.00	1922–23	(Note: Would re-emerge in junior football as Beith Juniors.)
Berwick Rangers	8	6	1	1	5	5	1	2	16	11	2	3	55	24	68.75	81.25	1995–96	(Note: Berwick are the only English-based team to play United in domestic competition.)
Bo'ness	5	1	3	1	5	1	2	2	10	2	5	3	12	10	20.00	70.00	1930–31	(Note: Was merged with Bo'ness Cadora to become junior team Bo'ness United.)
Brechin	18	10	2	6	23	10	6	7	41	20	8	13	105	63	48.78	68.29	2020-21	
Broxburn Utd	4	1	1	2	3	2	0	1	7	3	1	3	6	10	42.85	57.14	1924–25	
Buckie Thistle	0	0	0	0	2	2	0	0	2	2	0	0	8	2	100.00	100.00	2024-25	
Caledonian	1	1	0	0	1	0	1	0	2	1	1	0	7	3	50.00	100.00	1951–52	
Celtic	122	34	26	62	117	9	30	78	253	44	58	151	243	511	17.39	40.32	2025–26	
Clackmannan	1	1	0	0	1	0	1	0	2	1	1	0	8	2	50.00	100.00	1921–22	
Clyde	23	12	6	5	23	8	3	12	46	20	9	17	88	92	43.47	63.04	2007–08	
Clydebank (1965)	12	11	1	0	12	5	5	2	24	16	6	2	52	15	66.66	91.66	1998–99	(Note: The 1965 Clydebank were liquidated in 2002. A new club under the same name was formed in 2002l3.)
Clydebank F.C. (1914)	6	4	1	1	6	2	0	4	12	6	1	5	24	28	50.00	58.33	1930–31	(Note: The first club to represent Clydebank between 1914 and 1931 when they disbanded.)
Cowdenbeath	41	18	10	13	40	6	9	25	81	24	21	36	145	186	29.63	55.56	2019-20	
Dumbarton	47	28	11	8	47	14	6	27	94	42	17	35	202	162	44.68	62.77	2017-18	
Dundee	91	42	25	24	90	41	21	28	182	84	46	52	302	234	46.15	71.43	2025–26	
Dunfermline	91	49	21	21	87	25	24	38	178	74	45	59	264	255	41.57	66.85	2023–24	
East Fife	24	11	7	6	25	9	6	10	49	20	13	16	87	89	40.82	67.35	2021-22	
East Stirlingshire	25	16	5	4	25	6	8	11	51	23	13	15	131	81	45.09	70.58	2008–09	
Edinburgh City (1928)	7	5	1	1	7	4	1	2	14	9	2	3	58	30	64.28	78.57	1938–39	
Elgin City	1	1	0	0	1	1	0	0	2	2	0	0	10	1	100.00	100.00	2021-22	
Falkirk	55	34	10	11	56	22	11	23	111	56	21	34	181	167	50.45	69.37	2025–26	
Forfar	28	20	2	6	28	12	10	6	56	32	12	12	141	77	57.14	78.57	2020-21	
Forres Mechanics	1	1	0	0	0	0	0	0	1	1	0	0	3	0	100.00	100.00	2001–02	
Fraserburgh	0	0	0	0	1	1	0	0	1	1	0	0	6	2	100.00	100.00	1934–35	
Gretna	1	0	0	1	3	2	0	1	4	2	0	2	10	8	50.00	50.00	2007–08	(Note: Gretna were liquidated in 2008.)
Hamilton	40	21	7	12	44	19	9	16	85	41	16	28	168	127	48.24	67.06	2020-21	
Hearts	103	45	26	32	102	24	27	51	208	70	54	84	269	291	33.65	59.62	2025-26	
Hibernian	111	48	31	32	109	27	36	46	224	76	68	80	289	305	33.93	64.29	2025–26	
Huntly	0	0	0	0	1	1	0	0	1	1	0	0	3	1	100.00	100.00	1994–95	
Inverness CT	30	11	12	7	35	15	10	10	65	26	22	17	89	73	40.00	73.85	2023-24	
Johnstone	6	4	1	1	6	1	1	4	12	5	2	5	26	15	41.66	58.33	1924–25	
Kelty Hearts	1	1	0	0	1	1	0	0	2	2	0	0	2	0	100.00	100.00	2021-22	
Kilmarnock	85	34	29	22	88	25	19	44	175	59	49	67	272	270	33.71	61.71	2025–26	
King's Park	13	8	4	1	13	6	2	5	26	14	6	6	61	42	53.84	76.92	1938–39	
Leith Athletic	17	10	4	3	18	5	3	10	35	15	7	13	80	68	42.85	62.85	1951–52	
Livingston	20	10	3	7	21	6	6	9	41	16	9	16	54	47	39.02	60.98	2025-26	(Note: Livingston record includes the match played as Meadowbank Thistle.)
Lochgelly Utd	3	3	0	0	3	0	2	1	6	3	2	1	11	6	50.00	83.33	1923–24	
Montrose	15	9	2	4	17	7	4	6	32	16	6	10	77	60	48.38	67.74	2018-19	
Morton	66	40	13	13	62	19	11	32	128	59	24	45	253	224	46.09	64.84	2023–24	
Motherwell	118	53	39	26	116	45	19	52	235	98	58	79	359	334	41.70	66.38	2025–26	
Nithsdale Wanderers	2	1	0	1	0	0	0	0	2	1	0	1	14	1	50.00	50.00	1930–31	
Partick Thistle	63	36	17	10	65	25	17	23	128	61	34	33	207	162	47.66	74.23	2023–24	
Peterhead	3	2	0	1	1	1	0	0	4	3	0	1	8	3	75.00	75.00	2023-24	
Port Glasgow Ath	1	1	0	0	1	1	0	0	2	2	0	0	6	2	100.00	100.00	1910–11	
Queen of the South	20	12	5	3	25	12	8	5	47	26	13	8	102	63	55.32	82.98	2023-24	
Queen's Park	23	17	3	3	22	7	6	9	45	24	9	11	102	64	53.33	73.33	2023–24	
Raith Rovers	28	17	5	6	29	13	7	9	58	31	12	15	127	90	53.45	74.14	2023-24	
Rangers	105	24	30	51	109	16	19	74	225	41	51	133	204	418	18.22	40.89	2025–26	
Ross County	18	11	3	4	24	12	5	7	43	24	8	11	62	51	55.81	74.42	2024–25	
St Bernard's	18	10	4	4	18	2	2	14	36	12	6	18	63	86	33.33	50.00	1938–39	
St Johnstone	88	42	20	26	93	32	26	35	183	75	46	62	276	253	40.98	66.12	2024–25	
St Mirren	89	53	16	20	88	33	22	33	179	87	38	54	268	215	48.60	69.83	2025–26	
Spartans	1	1	0	0	1	0	0	1	2	1	0	1	2	2	50.00	50.00	2025-26	
Stenhousemuir	37	26	5	6	36	8	5	23	74	34	11	29	170	136	45.95	60.81	2024-25	
Stirling Albion	13	4	2	7	14	6	1	7	27	10	3	14	52	57	37.03	48.18	1998–99	
Stranraer	8	5	3	0	11	8	0	3	19	13	3	3	40	16	68.42	84.21	2016–17	
Third Lanark	16	10	1	5	14	4	2	8	30	14	3	13	49	71	46.66	56.66	1964–65	(Note: Third Lanark were liquidated in 1967.)
Vale of Leven	8	4	1	3	7	1	4	2	15	5	5	5	23	20	33.33	66.66	1926–27	

a All matches are either League or Cup matches played either home or away, matches played at neutral venues are also included in the total section.
b Results in all competitions until July 2012 are sourced to Arab Archive. Results in all competitions post July 2012 are sourced to BBC Sport.
c Type in a team to get all head-to-head results against that team.

== European matches ==
For Dundee United matches in Europe, see Dundee United F.C. in European football
