= 1924–25 Dundee United F.C. season =

Dundee United
1924–25 season
- Manager: Jimmy Brownlie
- Stadium: Tannadice Park
- Scottish Football League Second Division: 1st W20 D10 L8 F58 A44 P50
- Scottish Cup: Round 2

The 1924–25 Dundee United F.C. season was the 16th edition of Dundee United F.C. annual football play in Scottish Football League Second Division from 1 July 1924 to 30 June 1925.

== Match results ==
Dundee United played a total of 40 matches during the 1924–25 season, ranked 1st.

=== Legend ===
Win
Draw
Loss

All results are written with Dundee United's score first. Own goals in italics

=== Second Division ===
Date	Opponent	Venue	Result	Attendance	Scorers
16 August 1924	Bo'ness	A	2–2	3,000	
23 August 1924	Clyde	H	1–0	3,500	
30 August 1924	Dumbarton	A	3–3	2,000	
6 September 1924	Johnstone	H	3–1	3,000	
13 September 1924	King's Park	A	1–1	3,500	
20 September 1924	East Fife	H	1–0	4,000	
27 September 1924	Bathgate	A	2–2	2,000	
4 October 1924	St Bernard's	H	3–0	3,000	
11 October 1924	Arbroath	A	1–0	4,500	
18 October 1924	Arthurlie	H	4–1	6,000	
25 October 1924	Alloa Athletic	H	1–2	4,000	
1 November 1924	East Stirlingshire	A	3–2	3,000	
8 November 1924	Forfar Athletic	H	2–1	8,000	
15 November 1924	Dunfermline Athletic	A	0–0	5,000	
22 November 1924	Armadale	H	5–2	5,000	
29 November 1924	Albion Rovers	A	0–1	4,000	
13 December 1924	Clydebank	A	0–5	6,000	
20 December 1924	Broxburn United	A	1–0	1,500	
25 December 1924	Stenhousemuir	H	3–0	4,000	
27 December 1924	Bathgate	H	2–1	5,000	
1 January 1925	Forfar Athletic	A	0–0	3,000	
3 January 1925	Clyde	A	0–3	6,000	
5 January 1925	Clydebank	H	1–0	10,000	
10 January 1925	Bo'ness	H	0–0	8,000	
17 January 1925	Arthurlie	A	2–1	2,500	
31 January 1925	Dumbarton	H	0–0	6,000	
11 February 1925	Albion Rovers	H	3–2	3,000	
14 February 1925	East Fife	A	1–0	1,000	
21 February 1925	St Bernard's	A	2–1	3,000	
28 February 1925	King's Park	H	2–0	4,000	
7 March 1925	Alloa Athletic	A	0–2	4,000	
14 March 1925	Arbroath	H	1–1	10,000	
21 March 1925	Dunfermline Athletic	H	2–3	4,000	
28 March 1925	Armadale	A	0–1	2,000	
3 April 1925	Johnstone	A	2–0	2,000	
11 April 1925	East Stirlingshire	H	2–1	7,000	
18 April 1925	Broxburn United	H	2–2	3,000	
25 April 1925	Stenhousemuir	A	0–3	3,000	

=== Scottish Cup ===
Date	Rd	Opponent	Venue	Result	Attendance	Scorers
24 January 1925	R1	Aberdeen University	H	5–1	3,000	
7 February 1925	R2	Partick Thistle	A	1–5	22,000	
