= 1928–29 Dundee United F.C. season =

Dundee United
1928–29 season
- Manager: Jimmy Brownlie
- Stadium: Tannadice Park
- Scottish Football League Second Division: 1st W24 D3 L9 F99 A55 P51
- Scottish Cup: Round 4

The 1928–29 Dundee United F.C. season was the 24th edition of Dundee United F.C. annual football play in Scottish Football League Second Division from 1 July 1928 to 30 June 1929.

== Match results ==
Dundee United played a total of 44 matches during the 1928–29 season, ranked 1st.

=== Legend ===
Win
Draw
Loss

All results are written with Dundee United's score first. Own goals in italics

=== Second Division ===
Date	Opponent	Venue	Result	Attendance	Scorers
11 August 1928	Bathgate	A	4–0		
18 August 1928	Bo'ness	H	4–1	7,000	
25 August 1928	Clydebank	A	1–4	5,000	
1 September 1928	Dunfermline Athletic	H	1–0	7,000	
8 September 1928	St Bernard's	A	2–2	3,000	
15 September 1928	East Fife	A	5–4	3,000	
22 September 1928	Queen of the South	H	3–2	5,000	
29 September 1928	Armadale	A	2–0	1,000	
1 October 1928	St Bernard's	H	3–1	2,000	
6 October 1928	Greenock Morton	H	3–0	1,000	
13 October 1928	Albion Rovers	A	0–2	4,000	
20 October 1928	Alloa Athletic	H	5–0	3,000	
27 October 1928	King's Park	A	2–0	3,000	
3 November 1928	Leith Athletic	H	5–3	2,000	
10 November 1928	Stenhousemuir	H	8–0	6,000	
17 November 1928	Arthurlie	A	1–3	1,000	
24 November 1928	Arbroath	H	4–3	20,000	
1 December 1928	Dumbarton	H	3–1	3,000	
8 December 1928	Forfar Athletic	A	1–2	3,000	
15 December 1928	East Stirlingshire	A	3–2	3,000	
22 December 1928	Bo'ness	A	0–1	1,500	
29 December 1928	Bathgate	H	6–1	6,000	
2 January 1929	King's Park	H	4–0	6,000	
5 January 1929	Clydebank	H	2–1	5,000	
12 January 1929	Dunfermline Athletic	A	1–1	5,000	
9 February 1929	Queen of the South	A	3–2	3,000	
23 February 1929	Greenock Morton	A	0–2	10,000	
27 February 1929	Armadale	H	5–0	3,000	
6 March 1929	Albion Rovers	H	8–1	3,000	
9 March 1929	Leith Athletic	A	2–3	4,000	
16 March 1929	Stenhousemuir	A	4–1	2,000	
23 March 1929	Arthurlie	H	4–3	1,000	
30 March 1929	Arbroath	A	2–1	12,092	
6 April 1929	Dumbarton	A	1–1	1,000	
8 April 1929	East Fife	H	4–3	2,000	
13 April 1929	Alloa Athletic	A	0–3	2,000	
20 April 1929	Forfar Athletic	H	0–1	8,000	
27 April 1929	East Stirlingshire	H	3–1	5,000	

=== Scottish Cup ===
Date	Rd	Opponent	Venue	Result	Attendance	Scorers
19 January 1929	R1	Greenock Morton	H	3–1	15,000	
2 February 1929	R2	Stenhousemuir	A	1–1	3,700	
6 February 1929	R2 R	Stenhousemuir	H	2–0	8,800	
16 February 1929	R3	Dundee	A	1–1	24,000	
20 February 1929	R3 R	Dundee	H	1–0	14,000	
2 March 1929	R4	Rangers	A	1–3	49,000	
