= 1927–28 Dundee United F.C. season =

Dundee United
1927–28 season
- Manager: Jimmy Brownlie
- Stadium: Tannadice Park
- Scottish Football League Second Division: 6th W17 D9 L12 F81 A73 P43
- Scottish Cup: Round 2

The 1927–28 Dundee United F.C. season was the 23rd edition of Dundee United F.C. annual football played in Scottish Football League Second Division from 1 July 1927 to 30 June 1928.

== Match results ==
Dundee United played a total of 42 matches during the 1927–28 season, ranked 6th.

=== Legend ===
Win
Draw
Loss

All results are written with Dundee United's score first. Own goals in italics

=== Second Division ===
| Date | Opponent | Venue | Result | Attendance | Scorers |
|---|---|---|---|---|---|
| 13 August 1927 | Bathgate | H | 4–2 | 8,000 | |
| 20 August 1927 | Clydebank | A | 1–2 | 4,000 | |
| 27 August 1927 | Queen of the South | H | 1–1 | 8,000 | |
| 3 September 1927 | Forfar Athletic | A | 0–0 | 5,000 | |
| 10 September 1927 | King's Park | H | 1–1 | 4,000 | |
| 17 September 1927 | Arthurlie | A | 3–1 | 2,000 | |
| 24 September 1927 | Albion Rovers | H | 3–2 | 2,500 | |
| 1 October 1927 | Greenock Morton | A | 1–1 | 4,000 | |
| 8 October 1927 | St Bernard's | H | 5–3 | 5,000 | |
| 15 October 1927 | Alloa Athletic | A | 0–0 | 2,000 | |
| 22 October 1927 | Leith Athletic | A | 2–0 | 600 | |
| 29 October 1927 | Stenhousemuir | H | 5–3 | 5,000 | |
| 5 November 1927 | East Stirlingshire | H | 3–1 | 6,000 | |
| 12 November 1927 | Third Lanark | A | 1–5 | 6,000 | |
| 19 November 1927 | East Fife | A | 1–2 | 2,000 | |
| 26 November 1927 | Dumbarton | H | 3–1 | 5,000 | |
| 3 December 1927 | Arbroath | A | 2–3 | 6,000 | |
| 10 December 1927 | Ayr United | H | 1–3 | 10,000 | |
| 17 December 1927 | Armadale | A | 2–4 | 1,500 | |
| 24 December 1927 | Bathgate | A | 2–1 | 500 | |
| 31 December 1927 | Forfar Athletic | H | 4–0 | 7,000 | |
| 2 January 1928 | Alloa Athletic | H | 2–1 | 4,000 | |
| 3 January 1928 | King's Park | A | 1–0 | 4,000 | |
| 7 January 1928 | Queen of the South | A | 2–2 | 2,000 | |
| 14 January 1928 | Arthurlie | H | 9–2 | 3,000 | |
| 28 January 1928 | St Bernard's | A | 2–3 | 4,000 | |
| 11 February 1928 | Albion Rovers | A | 0–2 | 2,000 | |
| 15 February 1928 | Greenock Morton | H | 3–2 | 2,000 | |
| 18 February 1928 | Stenhousemuir | A | 2–2 | 1,000 | |
| 25 February 1928 | Leith Athletic | H | 3–1 | 4,000 | |
| 3 March 1928 | Clydebank | H | 2–2 | 4,000 | |
| 10 March 1928 | East Stirlingshire | A | 1–3 | 2,000 | |
| 17 March 1928 | Third Lanark | H | 4–3 | 10,000 | |
| 24 March 1928 | East Fife | H | 2–3 | 6,000 | |
| 31 March 1928 | Dumbarton | A | 0–3 | 1,000 | |
| 7 April 1928 | Arbroath | H | 1–0 | 8,000 | |
| 14 April 1928 | Ayr United | A | 1–7 | 5,000 | |
| 21 April 1928 | Armadale | H | 1–1 | 500 | |

=== Scottish Cup ===
| Date | Rd | Opponent | Venue | Result | Attendance | Scorers |
|---|---|---|---|---|---|---|
| 21 January 1928 | R1 | East Fife | A | 1–1 | 7,000 | |
| 25 January 1928 | R1 R | East Fife | H | 2–1 | 8,000 | |
| 4 February 1928 | R2 | Dundee | H | 3–3 | 20,365 | |
| 8 February 1928 | R2 R | Dundee | A | 0–1 | 12,839 | |
