= 1923–24 Scottish Division Three =

Scottish Division Three
- Season: 1923–24
- Champions: Arthurlie
- Promoted: Arthurlie and East Stirlingshire
- Matches played: 240
- Goals scored: 784 (3.27 per match)
- Biggest home win: 10 games by 5 goals^{[note 1]}
- Biggest away win: Brechin City 2–8 Galston (10 November 1923)
- Highest scoring: Brechin City 2–8 Galston (10 November 1923)
- Longest winning run: 6 games by Arthurlie
- Longest unbeaten run: 10 games by Solway Star
- Longest winless run: 13 games by Brechin City and Helensburgh
- Longest losing run: 6 games by Brechin City

The 1923–24 Scottish Division Three was the first season of the Scottish Division Three, the third-tier of Scottish football. It began on 18 August 1923 and ended on 28 April 1924. It was won by Arthurlie who, along with second placed East Stirlingshire, gained promotion to Division Two. Brechin City finished bottom.

== Clubs ==
Location of teams in 1923–24 Scottish Division Three

Club	Home town	Home ground
Arthurlie	Barrhead	Dunterlie Park
Beith	Beith	Bellsdale Park
Brechin City	Brechin	Glebe Park
Clackmannan	Clackmannan	Chapelhill Park
Dumbarton Harp	Dumbarton	Meadow Park
Dykehead	Shotts	Parkside
East Stirlingshire	Falkirk	Firs Park
Galston	Galston	Portland Park
Helensburgh	Helensburgh	Ardencaple Park
Mid-Annandale	Lockerbie	Kintail Park
Montrose	Montrose	Links Park
Nithsdale Wanderers	Sanquhar	Crawick Holm
Peebles Rovers	Peebles	Whitestone Park
Queen of the South	Dumfries	Palmerston Park
Royal Albert	Larkhall	Raploch Park
Solway Star	Annan	Kimmeter Park Green

== Table ==
Pos	Team	Pld	W	D	L	GF	GA	GR	Pts	Promotion or relegation
1	Arthurlie (C, P)	30	21	5	4	59	24	2.458	47	Promoted to the 1924–25 Scottish Division Two
2	East Stirlingshire (P)	30	17	8	5	63	36	1.750	42	Promoted to the 1924–25 Scottish Division Two
3	Queen of the South	30	14	10	6	64	31	2.065	38	
4	Montrose	30	15	6	9	60	48	1.250	36	
5	Dykehead	30	16	1	13	55	41	1.341	33	
6	Nithsdale Wanderers	30	13	7	10	42	35	1.200	33	
7	Beith	30	14	4	12	49	41	1.195	32	
8	Mid-Annandale	30	13	5	12	59	48	1.229	31	
9	Royal Albert	30	12	4	14	44	53	0.830	28	
10	Dumbarton Harp	30	10	8	12	40	51	0.784	28	
11	Solway Star	30	9	9	12	42	48	0.875	27	
12	Clackmannan	30	10	7	13	37	54	0.685	27	
13	Galston	30	11	3	16	53	70	0.757	25	
14	Peebles Rovers	30	7	8	15	43	56	0.768	22	
15	Helensburgh	30	5	7	18	46	72	0.639	17	
16	Brechin City	30	4	6	20	28	76	0.368	14	

Source: statto.com
Rules for classification: Teams are ranked by points then goal average. Points system: 2 points for a win, 1 point for a draw, 0 points for a loss
(C) Champions; (P) Promoted

== Results ==
Home \ Away	ART	BEI	BRE	CLK	DBH	DYK	EST	GAL	HEL	MAN	MON	NIT	PRO	QOS	ROY	SOL
Arthurlie		0–1	4–0	2–0	3–0	3–0	2–3	3–2	5–0	3–2	3–0	2–1	1–1	3–2	2–0	3–2
Beith	0–1		2–1	3–2	6–2	0–3	2–0	4–1	3–4	2–1	1–1	3–0	2–0	4–0	1–0	4–0
Brechin City	2–0	1–0		0–1	1–3	1–0	1–1	2–8	1–1	2–3	0–4	3–3	1–1	0–0	0–1	0–2
Clackmannan	0–1	2–2	2–1		1–1	3–0	5–1	1–1	3–0	1–0	1–2	1–3	0–0	0–1	3–2	2–1
Dumbarton Harp	0–2	0–0	0–2	2–3		1–0	0–0	4–1	1–1	0–0	4–3	1–0	1–0	0–5	2–0	3–1
Dykehead	1–2	5–1	4–0	3–0	3–2		4–0	3–1	1–0	3–2	1–0	2–0	4–1	2–2	4–0	1–0
East Stirlingshire	1–1	2–1	4–1	5–0	4–1	1–0		3–1	2–0	2–0	3–0	4–0	2–1	2–1	1–1	1–1
Galston	0–3	3–0	2–0	1–1	3–1	2–3	1–4		1–0	1–4	3–1	2–3	5–3	2–0	2–0	2–0
Helensburgh	0–2	1–2	3–2	1–2	1–3	2–4	3–3	2–1		3–3	4–0	0–0	2–4	2–2	6–1	1–1
Mid-Annandale	2–2	2–3	6–1	6–1	2–1	1–0	0–1	4–1	4–3		1–1	2–0	3–2	1–3	4–1	0–1
Montrose	1–1	2–1	4–2	1–0	1–1	6–2	2–1	5–0	4–1	2–0		2–1	1–0	1–1	2–1	5–1
Nithsdale Wanderers	0–1	2–0	5–0	1–1	0–4	1–0	0–0	4–0	2–0	2–0	3–0		3–2	1–1	3–1	2–1
Peebles Rovers	1–3	0–0	2–0	4–0	0–0	2–1	2–6	1–3	5–2	1–2	3–1	0–0		1–1	3–0	2–2
Queen of the South	0–0	2–0	7–2	5–0	5–2	2–0	1–0	6–1	4–0	3–0	3–3	0–0	4–0		0–1	1–1
Royal Albert	0–1	2–1	2–0	3–0	3–0	2–1	1–3	1–1	4–2	1–1	2–4	2–1	4–0	2–0		3–3
Solway Star	2–0	1–0	1–1	1–1	0–0	3–0	3–3	4–1	2–1	1–3	3–1	0–1	2–1	0–2	2–3	

Source: statto.com
Legend: Blue = home team win; Yellow = draw; Red = away team win.

== Notes ==
^1. Nithsdale Wanderers 5–0 Brechin City (25 August 1923); East Stirlingshire 5–0 Clackmannan (1 September 1923); Queen of the South 6–1 Galston (15 November 1923); Mid-Annandale 6–1 Clackmannan (17 November 1923); Queen of the South 7–2 Brechin City (15 December 1923); Arthurlie 5–0 Helensburgh (2 January 1924); Queen of the South 5–0 Clackmannan (8 March 1924); Helensburgh 6–1 Royal Albert (29 March 1924); Montrose 5–0 Galston (12 April 1924); Mid-Annandale 6–1 Brechin City (26 April 1924).
