= 1924–25 Scottish Division Three =

Season of the Scottish Football League

Scottish Division Three
- Season: 1924–25
- Champions: Nithsdale Wanderers
- Promoted: Nithsdale Wanderers; Queen of the South

The 1924–25 Scottish Division Three was won by Nithsdale Wanderers who, along with second placed Queen of the South, gained promotion to Division Two. Montrose finished bottom.

== Table ==
Pos	Team	Pld	W	D	L	GF	GA	GR	Pts	Promotion or relegation
1	Nithsdale Wanderers (C, P)	30	18	7	5	81	40	2.025	43	Promoted to the 1925–26 Scottish Division Two
2	Queen of the South (P)	30	17	6	7	67	32	2.094	40	Promoted to the 1925–26 Scottish Division Two
3	Solway Star	30	15	10	5	41	28	1.464	40	
4	Vale of Leven	30	17	4	9	61	43	1.419	38	
5	Lochgelly United	30	15	4	11	59	41	1.439	34	
6	Leith Athletic	30	13	5	12	48	42	1.143	31	
7	Helensburgh	30	12	7	11	68	60	1.133	31	
8	Peebles Rovers	30	12	7	11	64	57	1.123	31	
9	Royal Albert	30	9	8	13	48	61	0.787	26	
10	Clackmannan	30	10	6	14	35	48	0.729	26	
11	Galston	30	10	6	14	39	70	0.557	26	
12	Dykehead	29	7	11	11	30	47	0.638	25 (Note: A fixture between Dykehead and Brechin City was not played.)	
13	Beith	30	9	6	15	62	74	0.838	24	
14	Brechin City	29	9	4	16	51	61	0.836	22	
15	Mid-Annandale	30	7	7	16	47	70	0.671	21	
16	Montrose	30	8	4	18	39	66	0.591	20	
-	Dumbarton Harp	0	0	0	0	0	0	—	0	Resigned mid-season (Note: Dumbarton Harp resigned from the league after 17 matches and their record was expunged.)

Source: statto.com
Rules for classification: Teams are ranked by points then goal average. Points system: 2 points for a win, 1 point for a draw, 0 points for a loss
(C) Champions; (P) Promoted
Notes:
Location of teams in 1924–25 Scottish Division Three
