= 1924–25 Scottish Football League =

Scottish football season

Statistics of the Scottish Football League in season 1924–25.

== Scottish League Division One ==
Pos	Team	Pld	W	D	L	GF	GA	GD	Pts
1	Rangers	38	25	10	3	76	26	+50	60
2	Airdrieonians	38	25	7	6	85	31	+54	57
3	Hibernian	38	22	8	8	78	43	+35	52
4	Celtic	38	18	8	12	77	44	+33	44
5	Cowdenbeath	38	16	10	12	76	65	+11	42
6	St Mirren	38	18	5	15	66	63	+3	41
7	Partick Thistle	38	14	10	14	60	61	−1	38
8	Dundee	38	14	8	16	47	54	−7	36
9	Raith Rovers	38	14	8	16	53	61	−8	36
10	Heart of Midlothian	38	12	11	15	64	68	−4	35
11	St Johnstone	38	12	11	15	57	72	−15	35
12	Kilmarnock	38	12	9	17	53	64	−11	33
13	Hamilton Academical	38	15	3	20	50	63	−13	33
14	Morton	38	12	9	17	46	69	−23	33
15	Aberdeen	38	11	10	17	46	56	−10	32
16	Falkirk	38	12	8	18	44	54	−10	32
17	Queen's Park	38	11	9	18	50	72	−22	31
18	Motherwell	38	10	10	18	54	63	−9	30
19	Ayr United	38	11	8	19	43	65	−22	30
20	Third Lanark	38	11	8	19	53	84	−31	30

== Scottish League Division Two ==
Pos	Team	Pld	W	D	L	GF	GA	GD	Pts	Promotion or relegation
1	Dundee United	38	20	10	8	58	44	+14	50	Promotion to the 1925–26 Division One
2	Clydebank	38	20	8	10	65	42	+23	48	Promotion to the 1925–26 Division One
3	Clyde	38	20	7	11	72	39	+33	47	
4	Alloa Athletic	38	17	11	10	57	41	+16	45	
5	Arbroath	38	16	10	12	47	46	+1	42	
6	Bo'ness	38	16	9	13	71	48	+23	41	
7	Broxburn United	38	16	9	13	48	54	−6	41	
8	Dumbarton	38	15	10	13	45	44	+1	40	
9	East Fife	38	17	5	16	66	58	+8	39	
10	King's Park	38	15	8	15	54	46	+8	38	
11	Stenhousemuir	38	15	7	16	51	58	−7	37	
12	Arthurlie	38	14	8	16	56	60	−4	36	
13	Dunfermline Athletic	38	14	7	17	62	57	+5	35	
14	Albion Rovers	38	15	5	18	58	64	−6	35	
15	Armadale	38	15	5	18	55	62	−7	35	
16	Bathgate	38	12	10	16	58	74	−16	34	
17	St Bernard's	38	14	4	20	52	71	−19	32	
18	East Stirlingshire	38	11	8	19	58	72	−14	30	
19	Johnstone	38	12	4	22	53	85	−32	28	Relegated to the 1925–26 Division Three
20	Forfar Athletic	38	10	7	21	46	67	−21	27	Relegated to the 1925–26 Division Three

== Scottish League Division Three ==
Pos	Team	Pld	W	D	L	GF	GA	GR	Pts	Promotion or relegation
1	Nithsdale Wanderers (C, P)	30	18	7	5	81	40	2.025	43	Promoted to the 1925–26 Scottish Division Two
2	Queen of the South (P)	30	17	6	7	67	32	2.094	40	Promoted to the 1925–26 Scottish Division Two
3	Solway Star	30	15	10	5	41	28	1.464	40	
4	Vale of Leven	30	17	4	9	61	43	1.419	38	
5	Lochgelly United	30	15	4	11	59	41	1.439	34	
6	Leith Athletic	30	13	5	12	48	42	1.143	31	
7	Helensburgh	30	12	7	11	68	60	1.133	31	
8	Peebles Rovers	30	12	7	11	64	57	1.123	31	
9	Royal Albert	30	9	8	13	48	61	0.787	26	
10	Clackmannan	30	10	6	14	35	48	0.729	26	
11	Galston	30	10	6	14	39	70	0.557	26	
12	Dykehead	29	7	11	11	30	47	0.638	25 (Note: A fixture between Dykehead and Brechin City was not played.)	
13	Beith	30	9	6	15	62	74	0.838	24	
14	Brechin City	29	9	4	16	51	61	0.836	22	
15	Mid-Annandale	30	7	7	16	47	70	0.671	21	
16	Montrose	30	8	4	18	39	66	0.591	20	
-	Dumbarton Harp	0	0	0	0	0	0	—	0	Resigned mid-season (Note: Dumbarton Harp resigned from the league after 17 matches and their record was expunged.)

Source: statto.com
Rules for classification: Teams are ranked by points then goal average. Points system: 2 points for a win, 1 point for a draw, 0 points for a loss
(C) Champions; (P) Promoted

== See also ==
- 1924–25 in Scottish football
