= 1924–25 in Scottish football =

Football in Scotland
- Season: 1924–25

1924–25 in Scottish football

Division One champions
- Rangers

Division Two champions
- Dundee United

Division Three champions
- Nithsdale Wanderers

Scottish Cup winners
- Celtic

Junior Cup winners
- Saltcoats Victoria

Scotland national team
- 1925 BHC

The 1924–25 season was the 52nd season of competitive football in Scotland and the 35th season of the Scottish Football League.

== League competitions ==
=== Scottish League Division One ===
Pos	Team	Pld	W	D	L	GF	GA	GD	Pts
1	Rangers	38	25	10	3	76	26	+50	60
2	Airdrieonians	38	25	7	6	85	31	+54	57
3	Hibernian	38	22	8	8	78	43	+35	52
4	Celtic	38	18	8	12	77	44	+33	44
5	Cowdenbeath	38	16	10	12	76	65	+11	42
6	St Mirren	38	18	5	15	66	63	+3	41
7	Partick Thistle	38	14	10	14	60	61	−1	38
8	Dundee	38	14	8	16	47	54	−7	36
9	Raith Rovers	38	14	8	16	53	61	−8	36
10	Heart of Midlothian	38	12	11	15	64	68	−4	35
11	St Johnstone	38	12	11	15	57	72	−15	35
12	Kilmarnock	38	12	9	17	53	64	−11	33
13	Hamilton Academical	38	15	3	20	50	63	−13	33
14	Morton	38	12	9	17	46	69	−23	33
15	Aberdeen	38	11	10	17	46	56	−10	32
16	Falkirk	38	12	8	18	44	54	−10	32
17	Queen's Park	38	11	9	18	50	72	−22	31
18	Motherwell	38	10	10	18	54	63	−9	30
19	Ayr United	38	11	8	19	43	65	−22	30
20	Third Lanark	38	11	8	19	53	84	−31	30

Champions: Rangers
Relegated: Ayr United, Third Lanark

=== Scottish League Division Two ===
Pos	Team	Pld	W	D	L	GF	GA	GD	Pts	Promotion or relegation
1	Dundee United	38	20	10	8	58	44	+14	50	Promotion to the 1925–26 Division One
2	Clydebank	38	20	8	10	65	42	+23	48	Promotion to the 1925–26 Division One
3	Clyde	38	20	7	11	72	39	+33	47	
4	Alloa Athletic	38	17	11	10	57	41	+16	45	
5	Arbroath	38	16	10	12	47	46	+1	42	
6	Bo'ness	38	16	9	13	71	48	+23	41	
7	Broxburn United	38	16	9	13	48	54	−6	41	
8	Dumbarton	38	15	10	13	45	44	+1	40	
9	East Fife	38	17	5	16	66	58	+8	39	
10	King's Park	38	15	8	15	54	46	+8	38	
11	Stenhousemuir	38	15	7	16	51	58	−7	37	
12	Arthurlie	38	14	8	16	56	60	−4	36	
13	Dunfermline Athletic	38	14	7	17	62	57	+5	35	
14	Albion Rovers	38	15	5	18	58	64	−6	35	
15	Armadale	38	15	5	18	55	62	−7	35	
16	Bathgate	38	12	10	16	58	74	−16	34	
17	St Bernard's	38	14	4	20	52	71	−19	32	
18	East Stirlingshire	38	11	8	19	58	72	−14	30	
19	Johnstone	38	12	4	22	53	85	−32	28	Relegated to the 1925–26 Division Three
20	Forfar Athletic	38	10	7	21	46	67	−21	27	Relegated to the 1925–26 Division Three

Promoted: Dundee United, Clydebank
Relegated: Johnstone, Forfar Athletic

=== Scottish League Division Three ===
Pos	Team	Pld	W	D	L	GF	GA	GR	Pts	Promotion or relegation
1	Nithsdale Wanderers (C, P)	30	18	7	5	81	40	2.025	43	Promoted to the 1925–26 Scottish Division Two
2	Queen of the South (P)	30	17	6	7	67	32	2.094	40	Promoted to the 1925–26 Scottish Division Two
3	Solway Star	30	15	10	5	41	28	1.464	40	
4	Vale of Leven	30	17	4	9	61	43	1.419	38	
5	Lochgelly United	30	15	4	11	59	41	1.439	34	
6	Leith Athletic	30	13	5	12	48	42	1.143	31	
7	Helensburgh	30	12	7	11	68	60	1.133	31	
8	Peebles Rovers	30	12	7	11	64	57	1.123	31	
9	Royal Albert	30	9	8	13	48	61	0.787	26	
10	Clackmannan	30	10	6	14	35	48	0.729	26	
11	Galston	30	10	6	14	39	70	0.557	26	
12	Dykehead	29	7	11	11	30	47	0.638	25 (Note: A fixture between Dykehead and Brechin City was not played.)	
13	Beith	30	9	6	15	62	74	0.838	24	
14	Brechin City	29	9	4	16	51	61	0.836	22	
15	Mid-Annandale	30	7	7	16	47	70	0.671	21	
16	Montrose	30	8	4	18	39	66	0.591	20	
-	Dumbarton Harp	0	0	0	0	0	0	—	0	Resigned mid-season (Note: Dumbarton Harp resigned from the league after 17 matches and their record was expunged.)

Source: statto.com
Rules for classification: Teams are ranked by points then goal average. Points system: 2 points for a win, 1 point for a draw, 0 points for a loss
(C) Champions; (P) Promoted
Notes:

Promoted: Nithsdale Wanderers, Queen of the South

NOTE: Leith replace Dumbarton Harp who withdrew, fixtures expunged, Brechin awarded 2 pts when Dykehead failed to play return match.

== Other honours ==
=== National ===
Competition	Winner	Score	Runner-up
Scottish Cup	Celtic	2 – 1	Dundee
Scottish Qualifying Cup	Royal Albert	3 – 1	Clachnacuddin
Scottish Junior Cup	Saltcoats Victoria	2 – 1	St Anthony's
Scottish Amateur Cup	Coldstream	2 – 0	Larbert Amateurs
Queen's Park Shield	St Andrews University		

=== County ===
Competition	Winner	Score	Runner-up
Aberdeenshire Cup	Aberdeen	2 – 1 (Note: Aggregate score over two legs.)	Peterhead
Ayrshire Cup	Galston	4 – 1	Kilmarnock
Dumbartonshire Cup	Helensburgh	1 – 0	Dumbarton
East of Scotland Shield	Hibernian	3 – 1	Leith Athletic
Fife Cup	Raith Rovers	1 – 0	East Fife
Forfarshire Cup	Dundee	1 – 0	Arbroath
Glasgow Cup	Rangers	4 – 1	Celtic
Lanarkshire Cup	Airdrie	2 – 1	Albion Rovers
Linlithgowshire Cup	Bo'ness	4 – 1	Armadale
North of Scotland Cup	Caledonian	2 – 1 (Note: Third replay needed.)	Clachnacuddin
Perthshire Cup	Dunkeld & Birnam	3 – 2	Breadalbane
Renfrewshire Cup	St Mirren	2 – 1	Johnstone
Southern Counties Cup	Dalbeattie Star		
Stirlingshire Cup	Alloa Athletic	1 – 0	East Stirling

=== Non-league honours ===
Highland League

Top Three
Pos	Team	Pld	W	D	L	GF	GA	GD	Pts
1	Aberdeen 'A'	20	16	3	1	57	11	+46	35
2	Inverness Caledonian	20	12	3	5	41	18	+23	27
3	Elgin City	20	10	4	6	48	30	+18	24

East of Scotland League

Top Three
Pos	Team	Pld	W	D	L	GF	GA	GD	Pts
1	Vale of Leithen	12	8	3	1	49	17	+32	19
2	Civil Service Strollers	12	8	1	3	23	15	+8	17
3	Berwick Rangers	12	4	4	4	26	25	+1	12

Source: SFHA

== Scotland national team ==
Date	Venue	Opponents	Score	Competition	Scotland scorer(s)
14 February 1925	Tynecastle Park, Edinburgh (H)	Wales	3–1	BHC	Hugh Gallacher (2), David Meiklejohn
28 February 1925	Windsor Park, Belfast (A)	Ireland	3–0	BHC	David Meiklejohn, Hugh Gallacher, James Dunn
4 April 1925	Hampden Park, Glasgow (H)	England	2–0	BHC	Hugh Gallacher (2)

Scotland was winner of the 1924–25 British Home Championship.

Key:

- (H) = Home match
- (A) = Away match
- BHC = British Home Championship

== Other national teams ==
=== Scottish League XI ===
Date	Venue	Opponents	Score (Note: Scottish League XI's score is shown first.)	Scotland scorer(s)
29 October 1924	Tynecastle, Edinburgh (H)	(Northern Ireland) Irish League XI	3–0	
14 March 1925	Goodison Park, Liverpool (A)	(England) Football League XI	3–4	
