= 1923–24 Scottish Football League =

Scottish football season

Statistics of the Scottish Football League in season 1923–24.

== Scottish League Division One ==
Pos	Team	Pld	W	D	L	GF	GA	GD	Pts
1	Rangers	38	25	9	4	72	22	+50	59
2	Airdrieonians	38	20	10	8	72	46	+26	50
3	Celtic	38	17	12	9	56	33	+23	46
4	Raith Rovers	38	18	7	13	56	38	+18	43
5	Dundee	38	15	13	10	70	57	+13	43
6	St Mirren	38	15	12	11	53	45	+8	42
7	Hibernian	38	15	11	12	66	52	+14	41
8	Partick Thistle	38	15	9	14	58	55	+3	39
9	Heart of Midlothian	38	14	10	14	61	50	+11	38
10	Motherwell	38	15	7	16	58	63	−5	37
11	Morton	38	16	5	17	48	54	−6	37
12	Hamilton Academical	38	15	6	17	52	57	−5	36
13	Aberdeen	38	13	10	15	37	41	−4	36
14	Ayr United	38	12	10	16	38	60	−22	34
15	Falkirk	38	13	6	19	46	53	−7	32
16	Kilmarnock	38	12	8	18	48	65	−17	32
17	Queen's Park	38	11	9	18	43	60	−17	31
18	Third Lanark	38	11	8	19	54	78	−24	30
19	Clyde	38	10	9	19	40	70	−30	29
20	Clydebank	38	10	5	23	42	71	−29	25

Source: "1923-1924 Division 1 - SPFL Archive". SPFL (in Malay).

== Scottish League Division Two ==
Pos	Team	Pld	W	D	L	GF	GA	GD	Pts	Promotion or relegation
1	St Johnstone	38	22	12	4	79	31	+48	56	Promotion to the 1924–25 Division One
2	Cowdenbeath	38	23	9	6	78	33	+45	55	Promotion to the 1924–25 Division One
3	Bathgate	38	16	12	10	58	49	+9	44	
4	Stenhousemuir	38	16	11	11	58	45	+13	43	
5	Albion Rovers	38	15	12	11	67	53	+14	42	
6	King's Park	38	16	10	12	67	57	+10	42	
7	Dunfermline Athletic	38	14	11	13	52	46	+6	39	
8	Johnstone	38	16	7	15	60	56	+4	39	
9	Dundee United	38	12	15	11	41	41	0	39	
10	Dumbarton	38	17	5	16	55	56	−1	39	
11	Armadale	38	16	6	16	56	63	−7	38	
12	East Fife	38	14	9	15	54	47	+7	37	
13	Bo'ness	38	13	11	14	45	53	−8	37	
14	Forfar Athletic	38	14	7	17	42	67	−25	35	
15	Broxburn United	38	13	8	17	50	56	−6	34	
16	Alloa Athletic	38	14	6	18	44	53	−9	34	
17	Arbroath	38	12	8	18	49	51	−2	32	
18	St Bernard's	38	11	10	17	49	54	−5	32	
19	Vale of Leven	38	11	9	18	41	67	−26	31	Relegated to the 1924–25 Division Three
20	Lochgelly United	38	4	4	30	21	86	−65	12	Relegated to the 1924–25 Division Three

== Scottish League Division Three ==
Pos	Team	Pld	W	D	L	GF	GA	GR	Pts	Promotion or relegation
1	Arthurlie (C, P)	30	21	5	4	59	24	2.458	47	Promoted to the 1924–25 Scottish Division Two
2	East Stirlingshire (P)	30	17	8	5	63	36	1.750	42	Promoted to the 1924–25 Scottish Division Two
3	Queen of the South	30	14	10	6	64	31	2.065	38	
4	Montrose	30	15	6	9	60	48	1.250	36	
5	Dykehead	30	16	1	13	55	41	1.341	33	
6	Nithsdale Wanderers	30	13	7	10	42	35	1.200	33	
7	Beith	30	14	4	12	49	41	1.195	32	
8	Mid-Annandale	30	13	5	12	59	48	1.229	31	
9	Royal Albert	30	12	4	14	44	53	0.830	28	
10	Dumbarton Harp	30	10	8	12	40	51	0.784	28	
11	Solway Star	30	9	9	12	42	48	0.875	27	
12	Clackmannan	30	10	7	13	37	54	0.685	27	
13	Galston	30	11	3	16	53	70	0.757	25	
14	Peebles Rovers	30	7	8	15	43	56	0.768	22	
15	Helensburgh	30	5	7	18	46	72	0.639	17	
16	Brechin City	30	4	6	20	28	76	0.368	14	

Source: statto.com
Rules for classification: Teams are ranked by points then goal average. Points system: 2 points for a win, 1 point for a draw, 0 points for a loss
(C) Champions; (P) Promoted
