= 1921–22 in Scottish football =

Football in Scotland
- Season: 1921–22

1921–22 in Scottish football

Division One champions
- Celtic

Division Two champions
- Alloa Athletic

Scottish Cup winners
- Morton

Junior Cup winners
- St Roch's

Scotland national team
- 1922 BHC

The 1921–22 season was the 49th season of competitive football in Scotland and the 32nd season of the Scottish Football League. Division Two was reintroduced after having been abandoned due to World War I. Automatic promotion and relegation was introduced this season, as well as goal difference to divide teams who are level on points. Between next season and the 1974–75 season, goal average became the decider between teams equal on points.

The Queen's Park Shield, the national championship for the four ancient universities, started this season too.

== League competitions ==
=== Scottish League Division One ===
Pos	Team	Pld	W	D	L	GF	GA	GD	Pts	Qualification or relegation
1	Celtic (C)	42	27	13	2	83	20	+63	67	
2	Rangers	42	28	10	4	83	26	+57	66	
3	Raith Rovers	42	19	13	10	66	43	+23	51	
4	Dundee	42	19	11	12	57	40	+17	49	
5	Falkirk	42	16	17	9	48	38	+10	49	
6	Partick Thistle	42	20	8	14	57	53	+4	48	
7	Hibernian	42	16	14	12	55	44	+11	46	
8	St Mirren	42	17	12	13	71	61	+10	46	
9	Third Lanark	42	17	12	13	58	52	+6	46	
10	Clyde	42	16	12	14	60	51	+9	44	
11	Albion Rovers	42	17	10	15	55	51	+4	44	
12	Morton	42	16	10	16	58	57	+1	42	
13	Motherwell	42	16	7	19	63	58	+5	39	
14	Ayr United	42	13	12	17	55	63	−8	38	
15	Aberdeen	42	13	9	20	48	54	−6	35	
16	Airdrieonians	42	12	11	19	46	56	−10	35	
17	Kilmarnock	42	13	9	20	56	83	−27	35	
18	Hamilton Academical	42	9	16	17	51	62	−11	34	
19	Hearts	42	11	10	21	50	60	−10	32	
20	Dumbarton (R)	42	10	10	22	46	81	−35	30	Relegation to the 1922–23 Second Division
21	Queen's Park (R)	42	9	10	23	38	82	−44	28	Relegation to the 1922–23 Second Division
22	Clydebank (R)	42	6	8	28	34	103	−69	20	Relegation to the 1922–23 Second Division

Source: "1921-1922 Division 1 - SPFL Archive". SPFL.
(C) Champions; (R) Relegated

Champions: Celtic
Relegated: Dumbarton, Queen's Park, Clydebank

=== Scottish League Division Two ===
Pos	Team	Pld	W	D	L	GF	GA	GR	Pts	Promotion or relegation
1	Alloa Athletic (C, P)	38	26	8	4	81	32	2.531	60	Promoted to the 1922–23 Scottish Division One
2	Cowdenbeath	38	19	9	10	57	30	1.900	47	
3	Armadale	38	20	5	13	64	48	1.333	45	
4	Vale of Leven	38	17	10	11	54	43	1.256	44	
5	Bathgate	38	16	11	11	56	41	1.366	43	
6	Bo'ness	38	16	7	15	56	49	1.143	39	
7	Broxburn United	38	14	11	13	43	43	1.000	39	
8	Dunfermline Athletic	38	14	10	14	56	42	1.333	38	
9	St Bernard's	38	15	8	15	50	49	1.020	38	
10	East Fife	38	15	8	15	54	54	1.000	38	
11	Stenhousemuir	38	14	10	14	50	51	0.980	38	
12	Johnstone	38	14	10	14	46	59	0.780	38	
13	St Johnstone	38	12	11	15	41	52	0.788	35	
14	Forfar Athletic	38	11	12	15	43	51	0.843	34	
15	East Stirlingshire	38	12	10	16	43	60	0.717	34	
16	Arbroath	38	11	11	16	45	56	0.804	33	
17	King's Park	38	10	12	16	47	65	0.723	32	
18	Lochgelly United	38	11	9	18	46	54	0.852	31	
19	Dundee Hibernian	38	10	8	20	47	65	0.723	28	Left the League
20	Clackmannan	38	9	8	21	40	75	0.533	26	Left the League

Source: statto.com
Rules for classification: Teams are ranked by points then goal average. Points system: 2 points for a win, 1 point for a draw, 0 points for a loss
(C) Champions; (P) Promoted

Promoted: Alloa Athletic

== Other honours ==
=== National ===
Competition	Winner	Score	Runner-up
Scottish Cup	Morton	1 – 0	Rangers
Scottish Qualifying Cup	Montrose	2 – 1 (Note: Second replay needed.)	Nithsdale Wanderers
Scottish Junior Cup	St Roch's	2 – 1 (Note: Replay needed.)	Kilwinning Rangers
Scottish Amateur Cup	Greenock HSFP	3 – 1	Bo'ness
Queen's Park Shield	Aberdeen University		

=== County ===
Competition	Winner	Score	Runner-up
Aberdeenshire Cup	Aberdeen	5 – 0	Buckie Thistle
Ayrshire Cup	Kilmarnock	5 – 2	Stevenston United
Dumbartonshire Cup	Dumbarton	2 – 0	Dumbarton Harp
East of Scotland Shield	Hibernian	3 – 2	St Bernard's
Fife Cup	Raith Rovers	2 – 0	East Fife
Forfarshire Cup	Montrose	1 – 0	Forfar Athletic
Glasgow Cup	Rangers	1 – 0	Celtic
Lanarkshire Cup	Airdrie	3 – 0	Albion Rovers
Linlithgowshire Cup	Armadale	1 – 0	Bo'ness
North of Scotland Cup	Caledonian	3 – 0	Nairn County
Perthshire Cup	Vale of Atholl	2 – 0	Blairgowrie Amateurs
Renfrewshire Cup	Morton	2 – 0 (Note: Aggregate score over two legs.)	St Mirren
Southern Counties Cup	Nithsdale Wanderers	2 – 0 (Note: Replay needed.)	Queen of the South
Stirlingshire Cup	Stenhousemuir	2 – 0	Alloa Athletic

=== Non-league honours ===
Highland League

Top Three
Pos	Team	Pld	W	D	L	GF	GA	GD	Pts
1	Clachnacuddin	14	10	3	1	29	11	+18	23
2	Buckie Thistle	14	8	3	3	26	18	+8	19
3	Inverness Citadel	14	6	3	5	30	26	+4	15

Source: SFHA

== Scotland national team ==
Date	Venue	Opponents	Score	Competition	Scotland scorer(s)
4 February 1922	Racecourse Ground, Wrexham (A)	Wales	1–2	BHC	Sandy Archibald
4 March 1922	Celtic Park, Glasgow (H)	Northern Ireland	2–1	BHC	Andrew Wilson (2)
8 April 1922	Villa Park, Birmingham (A)	England	1–0	BHC	Andrew Wilson

Scotland were winners of the 1922 British Home Championship.

Key:

- (H) = Home match
- (A) = Away match
- BHC = British Home Championship

== Other national teams ==
=== Scottish League XI ===
Date	Venue	Opponents	Score (Note: Scottish League XI's score is shown first.)	Scotland scorer(s)
26 October 1921	Glasgow (H)	(Northern Ireland) Irish League XI	3–0	
18 March 1922	Ibrox, Glasgow (H)	(England) Football League XI	0–3	

== See also ==
- 1921–22 Aberdeen F.C. season
- Lord Provost's Rent Relief Cup
