= 1926–27 Scottish Football League =

Football league season

Statistics of the Scottish Football League in season 1926–27.

== Scottish League Division One ==
Pos	Team	Pld	W	D	L	GF	GA	GD	Pts
1	Rangers	38	23	10	5	85	41	+44	56
2	Motherwell	38	23	5	10	81	52	+29	51
3	Celtic	38	21	7	10	101	55	+46	49
4	Airdrieonians	38	18	9	11	97	64	+33	45
5	Dundee	38	17	9	12	77	51	+26	43
6	Falkirk	38	15	12	11	77	60	+17	42
7	Cowdenbeath	38	18	6	14	74	60	+14	42
8	Aberdeen	38	13	14	11	73	72	+1	40
9	Hibernian	38	16	7	15	62	71	−9	39
10	St Mirren	38	16	5	17	78	76	+2	37
11	Partick Thistle	38	15	6	17	89	74	+15	36
12	Queen's Park	38	15	6	17	74	84	−10	36
13	Heart of Midlothian	38	12	11	15	65	64	+1	35
14	St Johnstone	38	13	9	16	55	69	−14	35
15	Hamilton Academical	38	13	9	16	60	85	−25	35
16	Kilmarnock	38	12	8	18	54	71	−17	32
17	Clyde	38	10	9	19	54	85	−31	29
18	Dunfermline Athletic	38	10	8	20	53	85	−32	28
19	Morton	38	12	4	22	56	101	−45	28
20	Dundee United	38	7	8	23	56	101	−45	22

Source: "1926-1927 Division 1 - SPFL Archive". SPFL.

== Scottish League Division Two ==
Pos	Team	Pld	W	D	L	GF	GA	GD	Pts	Promotion or relegation
1	Bo'ness	38	23	10	5	86	41	+45	56	Promotion to the 1927–28 First Division
2	Raith Rovers	38	21	7	10	92	52	+40	49	Promotion to the 1927–28 First Division
3	Clydebank	38	18	9	11	94	75	+19	45	
4	Third Lanark	38	17	10	11	67	48	+19	44	
5	East Stirlingshire	38	18	8	12	93	75	+18	44	
6	East Fife	38	19	3	16	103	91	+12	41	
7	Arthurlie	38	18	5	15	90	83	+7	41	
8	Ayr United	38	13	15	10	67	68	−1	41	
9	Forfar Athletic	38	15	7	16	66	79	−13	37	
10	Stenhousemuir	38	12	12	14	69	76	−7	36	
11	Queen of the South	38	16	4	18	72	80	−8	36	
12	King's Park	38	13	9	16	76	75	+1	35	
13	St Bernard's	38	14	6	18	70	77	−7	34	
14	Alloa Athletic	38	12	10	16	70	77	−7	34	
15	Armadale	38	12	10	16	70	78	−8	34	
16	Albion Rovers	38	11	11	16	74	87	−13	33	
17	Bathgate	38	13	7	18	76	98	−22	33	
18	Dumbarton	38	13	6	19	69	84	−15	32	
19	Arbroath	38	13	6	19	64	83	−19	32	
20	Nithsdale Wanderers	38	7	9	22	59	100	−41	23	

== See also ==
- 1926–27 in Scottish football
