= 1922–23 Scottish Football League =

Scottish football season

Statistics of the Scottish Football League in season 1922–23.

== Scottish League Division One ==
Pos	Team	Pld	W	D	L	GF	GA	GD	Pts
1	Rangers	38	23	9	6	67	29	+38	55
2	Airdrieonians	38	20	10	8	58	38	+20	50
3	Celtic	38	19	8	11	52	39	+13	46
4	Falkirk	38	14	17	7	44	32	+12	45
5	Aberdeen	38	15	12	11	46	34	+12	42
6	St Mirren	38	15	12	11	54	44	+10	42
7	Dundee	38	17	7	14	51	45	+6	41
8	Hibernian	38	17	7	14	45	40	+5	41
9	Raith Rovers	38	13	13	12	31	43	−12	39
10	Ayr United	38	13	12	13	43	44	−1	38
11	Partick Thistle	38	14	9	15	51	48	+3	37
12	Heart of Midlothian	38	11	15	12	51	50	+1	37
13	Motherwell	38	13	10	15	59	60	−1	36
14	Morton	38	12	11	15	44	47	−3	35
15	Kilmarnock	38	14	7	17	57	66	−9	35
16	Clyde	38	12	9	17	36	44	−8	33
17	Third Lanark	38	11	8	19	40	59	−19	30
18	Hamilton Academical	38	11	7	20	43	59	−16	29
19	Albion Rovers	38	8	10	20	38	64	−26	26
20	Alloa Athletic	38	6	11	21	27	52	−25	23

Source: "1922-1923 Division 1 - SPFL Archive". SPFL.

== Scottish League Division Two ==
Pos	Team	Pld	W	D	L	GF	GA	GD	Pts	Promotion or relegation
1	Queen's Park	38	24	9	5	73	31	+42	57	Promotion to the 1923–24 Division One
2	Clydebank	38	21	10	7	69	29	+40	52	Promotion to the 1923–24 Division One
3	St Johnstone	38	19	12	7	60	39	+21	48 (Note: 2 points deducted)	
4	Dumbarton	38	17	8	13	61	40	+21	42	
5	Bathgate	38	16	9	13	67	55	+12	41	
6	Armadale	38	15	11	12	63	52	+11	41	
7	Bo'ness	38	12	17	9	48	46	+2	41	
8	Broxburn United	38	14	12	12	42	45	−3	40	
9	East Fife	38	16	7	15	48	42	+6	39	
10	Lochgelly United	38	16	5	17	41	64	−23	37	
11	Cowdenbeath	38	16	6	16	56	52	+4	36	
12	King's Park	38	14	6	18	46	59	−13	34	
13	Dunfermline Athletic	38	11	11	16	46	44	+2	33	
14	Stenhousemuir	38	13	7	18	53	67	−14	33	
15	Forfar Athletic	38	13	7	18	53	73	−20	33	
16	Johnstone	38	13	6	19	41	62	−21	32	
17	Vale of Leven	38	11	8	19	50	59	−9	30	
18	St Bernard's	38	8	15	15	39	50	−11	29	
19	East Stirlingshire	38	10	8	20	48	69	−21	28	Relegated to the 1923–24 Division Three
20	Arbroath	38	8	12	18	45	71	−26	28	

== See also ==
- 1922–23 in Scottish football
