= 1927–28 Scottish Football League =

Scottish football season

Statistics of the Scottish Football League in season 1927–28.

== Scottish League Division One ==
Pos	Team	Pld	W	D	L	GF	GA	GD	Pts
1	Rangers	38	26	8	4	109	36	+73	60
2	Celtic	38	23	9	6	93	39	+54	55
3	Motherwell	38	23	9	6	92	46	+46	55
4	Heart of Midlothian	38	20	7	11	89	50	+39	47
5	St Mirren	38	18	8	12	77	76	+1	44
6	Partick Thistle	38	18	7	13	85	67	+18	43
7	Aberdeen	38	19	5	14	71	61	+10	43
8	Kilmarnock	38	15	10	13	68	78	−10	40
9	Cowdenbeath	38	16	7	15	66	68	−2	39
10	Falkirk	38	16	5	17	76	69	+7	37
11	St Johnstone	38	14	8	16	66	67	−1	36
12	Hibernian	38	13	9	16	73	75	−2	35
13	Airdrieonians	38	12	11	15	59	69	−10	35
14	Dundee	38	14	7	17	65	80	−15	35
15	Clyde	38	10	11	17	46	72	−26	31
16	Queen's Park	38	12	6	20	69	80	−11	30
17	Raith Rovers	38	11	7	20	60	89	−29	29
18	Hamilton Academical	38	11	6	21	67	86	−19	28
19	Bo'ness	38	9	8	21	48	86	−38	26
20	Dunfermline Athletic	38	4	4	30	41	126	−85	12

Source: "1927-1928 Division 1 - SPFL Archive". SPFL.

== Scottish League Division Two ==
Pos	Team	Pld	W	D	L	GF	GA	GD	Pts	Promotion or relegation
1	Ayr United (P)	38	24	6	8	117	60	+57	54	Promotion to the 1928–29 First Division
2	Third Lanark (P)	38	18	9	11	101	66	+35	45	Promotion to the 1928–29 First Division
3	King's Park	38	16	12	10	84	68	+16	44	
4	East Fife	38	18	7	13	87	73	+14	43	
5	Forfar Athletic	38	18	7	13	83	73	+10	43	
6	Dundee United	38	17	9	12	81	73	+8	43	
7	Arthurlie	38	18	4	16	85	90	−5	40	
8	Albion Rovers	38	17	4	17	79	69	+10	38	
9	East Stirlingshire	38	14	10	14	84	76	+8	38	
10	Arbroath	38	16	4	18	84	86	−2	36	
11	Dumbarton	38	16	4	18	66	72	−6	36	
12	Queen of the South	38	15	6	17	92	106	−14	36	
13	Leith Athletic	38	13	9	16	76	71	+5	35	
14	Clydebank	38	16	3	19	78	80	−2	35	
15	Alloa Athletic	38	12	11	15	72	76	−4	35	
16	Stenhousemuir	38	15	5	18	75	82	−7	35	
17	St Bernard's	38	15	5	18	75	103	−28	35	
18	Morton	38	13	8	17	65	82	−17	34	
19	Bathgate	38	10	11	17	62	81	−19	31	
20	Armadale	38	8	8	22	53	112	−59	24	

(P) Promoted

== See also ==
- 1927–28 in Scottish football
