= 1909–10 Heart of Midlothian F.C. season =

Heart of Midlothian
1909–10 season
- Manager: James McGhee (to December); John McCartney (from January)
- Stadium: Tynecastle Park
- Scottish First Division: 12th
- Scottish Cup: 3rd Round

During the 1909–10 season Hearts competed in the Scottish First Division, the Scottish Cup and the East of Scotland Shield.

== Fixtures ==
=== Dunedin Cup ===
16 August 1909 Dunedin Cup R1	Raith Rovers	1–0	Hearts	Stark's Park

=== North Eastern Cup ===
11 September 1909 North Eastern Cup 1st Round	Hearts	3–0	Hibernian	Tynecastle Park

25 September 1909 North Eastern Cup SF	Hearts	0–0	Dundee	Tynecastle Park

4 October 1909 North Eastern Cup SF Replay	Dundee	2–3	Hearts	Dens Park

25 April 1910 North Eastern Cup SF	Hearts	3–0	Leith Athletic	Tynecastle Park

=== East of Scotland Cup ===
15 April 1912 East of Scotland Cup SF	Hearts	7–0	St Bernard's	Tynecastle Park

22 April 1911 East of Scotland Cup Final	Hearts	4–1	Broxburn	Tynecastle Park

=== Rosebery Charity Cup ===
7 May 1910 Rosebery Charity Cup SF	Hearts	0–1	Hibernian	Tynecastle Park

=== Scottish Cup ===
22 January 1910 Scottish Cup R1	Bathgate	0–4	Hearts	Mill Park
				Attendance: 4,000

5 February 1910 Scottish Cup R2	St Mirren	2–2	Hearts	St Mirren Park, Love Street
				Attendance: 12,000

12 February 1910 Scottish Cup R2 Replay	Hearts	0–0	St Mirren	Tynecastle Park
				Attendance: 25,000

16 February 1910 Scottish Cup R2 Replay	Hearts	4–0	St Mirren	Ibrox Park
				Attendance: 10,000

26 February 1910 Scottish Cup R3	Hearts	0–1	Hibernian	Tynecastle Park
				Attendance: 25,000

=== Scottish First Division ===
21 August 1909 Scottish First Division	Hearts	2–0	Clyde	Tynecastle Park
				Attendance: 13,500

28 August 1909 Scottish First Division	Queen's Park	2–2	Hearts	Hampden Park
				Attendance: 10,000

4 September 1909 Scottish First Division	Hearts	0–0	Aberdeen	Tynecastle Park
				Attendance: 13,500

18 September 1909 Scottish First Division	Port Glasgow Athletic	0–2	Hearts	Clune Park
				Attendance: 3,000

20 September 1909 Scottish First Division	Hearts	1–2	Celtic	Tynecastle Park
				Attendance: 16,500

2 October 1909 Scottish First Division	Hearts	3–0	Kilmarnock	Tynecastle Park
				Attendance: 6,000

9 October 1909 Scottish First Division	St Mirren	1–0	Hearts	St Mirren Park, Love Street
				Attendance: 6,000

16 October 1909 Scottish First Division	Hearts	5–1	Morton	Tynecastle Park
				Attendance: 8,000

23 October 1909 Scottish First Division	Hibernian	1–4	Hearts	Easter Road
				Attendance: 14,000

30 October 1909 Scottish First Division	Hearts	2–2	Partick Thistle	Celtic Park
				Attendance: 9,500

6 November 1909 Scottish First Division	Celtic	1–0	Hearts	Celtic Park
				Attendance: 16,000

13 November 1909 Scottish First Division	Dundee	4–1	Hearts	Dens Park
				Attendance: 12,000

20 November 1909 Scottish First Division	Hearts	1–2	Hamilton Academical	Tynecastle Park
				Attendance: 5,500

27 November 1909 Scottish First Division	Hearts	0–1	St Mirren	Tynecastle Park
				Attendance: 2,500

11 December 1909 Scottish First Division	Hearts	5–1	Motherwell	Tynecastle Park
				Attendance: 2,000

18 December 1909 Scottish First Division	Morton	3–3	Hearts	Cappielow Park
				Attendance: 3,000

25 December 1909 Scottish First Division	Hearts	3–2	Queen's Park	Tynecastle Park
				Attendance: 6,500

1 January 1910 Scottish First Division	Hearts	1–0	Hibernian	Tynecastle Park
				Attendance: 14,000

3 January 1910 Scottish First Division	Hearts	1–0	Dundee	Tynecastle Park
				Attendance: 12,000

8 January 1910 Scottish First Division	Rangers	1–0	Hearts	Ibrox Park
				Attendance: 3,000

15 January 1910 Scottish First Division	Hearts	0–1	Airdrieonians	Tynecastle Park
				Attendance: 6,500

29 January 1910 Scottish First Division	Falkirk	2–1	Hearts	Brockville Park
				Attendance: 8,000

5 March 1910 Scottish First Division	Partick Thistle	1–3	Hearts	Firhill Park
				Attendance: 10,000

12 March 1910 Scottish First Division	Aberdeen	3–0	Hearts	Pittodrie Park
				Attendance: 3,500

19 March 1910 Scottish First Division	Hearts	6–0	Port Glasgow Athletic	Tynecastle Park
				Attendance: 3,500

26 March 1910 Scottish First Division	Airdrieonians	3–1	Hearts	Broomfield Park
				Attendance: 4,000

2 April 1910 Scottish First Division	Hearts	2–2	Third Lanark	Tynecastle Park
				Attendance: 4,500

9 April 1910 Scottish First Division	Motherwell	1–0	Hearts	Fir Park
				Attendance: 2,000

13 April 1910 Scottish First Division	Clyde	2–2	Hearts	Shawfield Stadium
				Attendance: 500

16 April 1910 Scottish First Division	Hearts	4–2	Falkirk	Tynecastle Park
				Attendance: 2,500

18 April 1910 Scottish First Division	Hearts	1–3	Rangers	Tynecastle Park
				Attendance: 7,000

20 April 1910 Scottish First Division	Third Lanark	3–1	Hearts	Cathkin Park
				Attendance: 1,500

23 April 1910 Scottish First Division	Hamilton Academical	2–1	Hearts	Douglas Park
				Attendance: 2,000

30 April 1910 Scottish First Division	Kilmarnock	1–1	Hearts	Rugby Park
				Attendance: 4,000

== See also ==
- List of Heart of Midlothian F.C. seasons
