= 1926–27 in Scottish football =

Football in Scotland
- Season: 1926–27

1926–27 in Scottish football

Division One champions
- Rangers

Division Two champions
- Bo'ness

Scottish Cup winners
- Celtic

Junior Cup winners
- Rutherglen Glencairn

Scotland national team
- 1927 BHC

The 1926–27 season was the 54th season of competitive football in Scotland and the 37th season of the Scottish Football League.

In addition, the Scotland national amateur team (under the auspices of the SFA) played its first international match.

== League competitions ==
=== Scottish League Division One ===
Pos	Team	Pld	W	D	L	GF	GA	GD	Pts
1	Rangers	38	23	10	5	85	41	+44	56
2	Motherwell	38	23	5	10	81	52	+29	51
3	Celtic	38	21	7	10	101	55	+46	49
4	Airdrieonians	38	18	9	11	97	64	+33	45
5	Dundee	38	17	9	12	77	51	+26	43
6	Falkirk	38	15	12	11	77	60	+17	42
7	Cowdenbeath	38	18	6	14	74	60	+14	42
8	Aberdeen	38	13	14	11	73	72	+1	40
9	Hibernian	38	16	7	15	62	71	−9	39
10	St Mirren	38	16	5	17	78	76	+2	37
11	Partick Thistle	38	15	6	17	89	74	+15	36
12	Queen's Park	38	15	6	17	74	84	−10	36
13	Heart of Midlothian	38	12	11	15	65	64	+1	35
14	St Johnstone	38	13	9	16	55	69	−14	35
15	Hamilton Academical	38	13	9	16	60	85	−25	35
16	Kilmarnock	38	12	8	18	54	71	−17	32
17	Clyde	38	10	9	19	54	85	−31	29
18	Dunfermline Athletic	38	10	8	20	53	85	−32	28
19	Morton	38	12	4	22	56	101	−45	28
20	Dundee United	38	7	8	23	56	101	−45	22

Source: "1926-1927 Division 1 - SPFL Archive". SPFL.

Champions: Rangers
Relegated: Greenock Morton, Dundee United

=== Scottish League Division Two ===
Pos	Team	Pld	W	D	L	GF	GA	GD	Pts	Promotion or relegation
1	Bo'ness	38	23	10	5	86	41	+45	56	Promotion to the 1927–28 First Division
2	Raith Rovers	38	21	7	10	92	52	+40	49	Promotion to the 1927–28 First Division
3	Clydebank	38	18	9	11	94	75	+19	45	
4	Third Lanark	38	17	10	11	67	48	+19	44	
5	East Stirlingshire	38	18	8	12	93	75	+18	44	
6	East Fife	38	19	3	16	103	91	+12	41	
7	Arthurlie	38	18	5	15	90	83	+7	41	
8	Ayr United	38	13	15	10	67	68	−1	41	
9	Forfar Athletic	38	15	7	16	66	79	−13	37	
10	Stenhousemuir	38	12	12	14	69	76	−7	36	
11	Queen of the South	38	16	4	18	72	80	−8	36	
12	King's Park	38	13	9	16	76	75	+1	35	
13	St Bernard's	38	14	6	18	70	77	−7	34	
14	Alloa Athletic	38	12	10	16	70	77	−7	34	
15	Armadale	38	12	10	16	70	78	−8	34	
16	Albion Rovers	38	11	11	16	74	87	−13	33	
17	Bathgate	38	13	7	18	76	98	−22	33	
18	Dumbarton	38	13	6	19	69	84	−15	32	
19	Arbroath	38	13	6	19	64	83	−19	32	
20	Nithsdale Wanderers	38	7	9	22	59	100	−41	23	Left the League

Promoted: Bo'ness United, Raith Rovers
Relegated: Nithsdale Wanderers

== Other honours ==
=== National ===
Competition	Winner	Score	Runner-up
Scottish Cup	Celtic	3 – 1	East Fife
Scottish Qualifying Cup	Mid Annandale	4 – 1	Brechin City
Scottish Junior Cup	Rutherglen Glencairn	2 – 1	Cambuslang Rangers
Scottish Amateur Cup	Glasgow University	2 – 1	Greenock HSFP
Queen's Park Shield	Glasgow University		

=== County ===
Competition	Winner	Score	Runner-up
Aberdeenshire Cup	Aberdeen	8 – 1 (Note: Aggregate score over two legs.)	Fraserburgh
Ayrshire Cup	Beith	3 – 0	Kilmarnock
Dumbartonshire Cup	Helensburgh	6 – 0	Dumbarton
East of Scotland Shield	Hearts	5 – 1	Hibernian
Fife Cup	Dunfermline Athletic	6 – 2	Lochgelly United
Forfarshire Cup	Brechin City	4 – 3	Montrose
Glasgow Cup	Celtic	1 – 0	Rangers
Lanarkshire Cup	Motherwell	2 – 0 (Note: Replay needed.)	Albion Rovers
North of Scotland Cup	Forres Mechanics	3 – 2	Inverness Thistle
Perthshire Cup	St Johnstone	6 – 2	Breadalbane
Renfrewshire Cup	St Mirren	8 – 1	Arthurlie
Southern Counties Cup	Stranraer	3 – 2	Thornhill
Stirlingshire Cup	Falkirk	3 – 1	Bo'ness

=== Non-league honours ===
Highland League

Top Three
Pos	Team	Pld	W	D	L	GF	GA	GD	Pts
1	Buckie Thistle	18	13	1	4	50	35	+15	27
2	Clachnacuddin	18	12	2	4	57	26	+31	26
3	Inverness Caledonian	18	11	3	4	42	36	+6	25

Source: SFHA

East of Scotland League

Top Three
Pos	Team	Pld	W	D	L	GF	GA	GD	Pts
1	Civil Service Strollers	16	8	5	3	49	24	+25	21
2	Selkirk	16	8	3	5	33	24	+9	19
3	Gala Fairydean	16	9	1	6	55	48	+7	19

Source: SFHA

== Scotland national team ==
Date	Venue	Opponents	Score	Competition	Scotland scorer(s)
30 October 1926	Ibrox Park, Glasgow (H)	Wales	3–0	BHC	Alex Jackson (2), Hughie Gallacher
26 February 1927	Windsor Park, Belfast (A)	Ireland	2–0	BHC	Alan Morton (2)
2 April 1927	Hampden Park, Glasgow (H)	England	1–2	BHC	Alan Morton

Scotland were joint winners with England in the 1926–27 British Home Championship.

Key:

- (H) = Home match
- (A) = Away match
- BHC = British Home Championship

== Other national teams ==
=== Scottish League XI ===
Date	Venue	Opponents	Score (Note: Scottish League XI's score is shown first.)	Scotland scorer(s)
27 October 1926	Tynecastle, Edinburgh (H)	(Northern Ireland) Irish League XI	5–2	
19 March 1927	Filbert Street, Leicester (A)	(England) Football League XI	2–2	

=== Scottish national amateur team ===
Date	Venue	Opponents	Score (Note: Scotland amateur team's score is shown first.)	Competition	Scotland scorer(s)
18 December 1926	Filbert Street, Leicester (A)	England	1–4	Friendly	
