= 1921–22 Scottish Football League =

Scottish football season

Statistics of the Scottish Football League in season 1921–22.

== Scottish League Division One ==
Pos	Team	Pld	W	D	L	GF	GA	GD	Pts	Qualification or relegation
1	Celtic	42	27	13	2	83	20	+63	67	
2	Rangers	42	28	10	4	83	26	+57	66	
3	Raith Rovers	42	19	13	10	66	43	+23	51	
4	Dundee	42	19	11	12	57	40	+17	49	
5	Falkirk	42	16	17	9	48	38	+10	49	
6	Partick Thistle	42	20	8	14	57	53	+4	48	
7	Hibernian	42	16	14	12	55	44	+11	46	
8	St Mirren	42	17	12	13	71	61	+10	46	
9	Third Lanark	42	17	12	13	58	52	+6	46	
10	Clyde	42	16	12	14	60	51	+9	44	
11	Albion Rovers	42	17	10	15	55	51	+4	44	
12	Morton	42	16	10	16	58	57	+1	42	
13	Motherwell	42	16	7	19	63	58	+5	39	
14	Ayr United	42	13	12	17	55	63	−8	38	
15	Aberdeen	42	13	9	20	48	54	−6	35	
16	Airdrieonians	42	12	11	19	46	56	−10	35	
17	Kilmarnock	42	13	9	20	56	83	−27	35	
18	Hamilton Academical	42	9	16	17	51	62	−11	34	
19	Hearts	42	11	10	21	50	60	−10	32	
20	Dumbarton	42	10	10	22	46	81	−35	30	Relegation to the 1922–23 Second Division
21	Queen's Park	42	9	10	23	38	82	−44	28	Relegation to the 1922–23 Second Division
22	Clydebank	42	6	8	28	34	103	−69	20	Relegation to the 1922–23 Second Division

Source: "1921-1922 Division 1 - SPFL Archive". SPFL.

== Scottish League Division Two ==
Pos	Team	Pld	W	D	L	GF	GA	GR	Pts	Promotion or relegation
1	Alloa Athletic (C, P)	38	26	8	4	81	32	2.531	60	Promoted to the 1922–23 Scottish Division One
2	Cowdenbeath	38	19	9	10	57	30	1.900	47	
3	Armadale	38	20	5	13	64	48	1.333	45	
4	Vale of Leven	38	17	10	11	54	43	1.256	44	
5	Bathgate	38	16	11	11	56	41	1.366	43	
6	Bo'ness	38	16	7	15	56	49	1.143	39	
7	Broxburn United	38	14	11	13	43	43	1.000	39	
8	Dunfermline Athletic	38	14	10	14	56	42	1.333	38	
9	St Bernard's	38	15	8	15	50	49	1.020	38	
10	East Fife	38	15	8	15	54	54	1.000	38	
11	Stenhousemuir	38	14	10	14	50	51	0.980	38	
12	Johnstone	38	14	10	14	46	59	0.780	38	
13	St Johnstone	38	12	11	15	41	52	0.788	35	
14	Forfar Athletic	38	11	12	15	43	51	0.843	34	
15	East Stirlingshire	38	12	10	16	43	60	0.717	34	
16	Arbroath	38	11	11	16	45	56	0.804	33	
17	King's Park	38	10	12	16	47	65	0.723	32	
18	Lochgelly United	38	11	9	18	46	54	0.852	31	
19	Dundee Hibernian	38	10	8	20	47	65	0.723	28	
20	Clackmannan	38	9	8	21	40	75	0.533	26	

Source: statto.com
Rules for classification: Teams are ranked by points then goal average. Points system: 2 points for a win, 1 point for a draw, 0 points for a loss
(C) Champions; (P) Promoted

== See also ==
- 1921–22 in Scottish football
