= Christy Martin (footballer) =

Irish footballer

Personal information
- Place of birth: Athlone, County Westmeath, Ireland
- Height: 5 ft 6 in (1.68 m)
- Position: Outside right

Youth career
- St. Anthony's

Senior career*
Years	Team	Apps	(Gls)
1924–1928	Bo'ness		
1928–1929	Falkirk		
1929–1931	Brooklyn Wanderers	1	(0)
1931–1932	Bo'ness		

International career
1925	Ireland (IFA)	1	(0)
1927	Irish Free State (FAI)	1	(0)
- * Club domestic league appearances and goals

Christy Martin was an Irish footballer who played in the Scottish League with both Bo'ness and Falkirk. Martin was also a dual international and played for both Ireland teams – the IFA XI and the FAI XI.

== Club career ==
Martin first came to prominence as a goalscorer with Bo'ness, scoring 34 goals during the 1924–25 season. His 29 goals during the in 1926–27 season helped Bo'ness win the Scottish Second Division title and gain promotion to the First Division. The Saturday before he made his debut for the FAI XI, he scored a hat-trick for Bo'ness against Clydebank. Bo'ness lasted just a single season in the First Division. With Martin limited to just seven goals from 37 games, they finished 19th and were relegated back to Second Division. Martin also briefly played with Falkirk and had a spell with Brooklyn Wanderers, playing only one game, in the American Soccer League before returning to finish career at Bo'ness.

== Irish international ==
When Martin began his international career in 1925 there were, in effect, two Ireland teams, chosen by two rival associations. Both associations, the Northern Ireland–based IFA and the Irish Free State–based FAI claimed jurisdiction over the whole of Ireland and selected players from the whole island. As a result, several notable Irish players from this era, including Martin, played for both teams.

=== IFA XI ===
Martin made his one and only appearances for the IFA XI on 28 February 1925 in a 3–0 defeat against Scotland at Windsor Park.

=== FAI XI ===
Martin made his only appearance for the FAI XI on 23 April 1927 in a 2–1 defeat against Italy B at Lansdowne Road. He was the first player from a Scottish League club to play for an FAI XI.

== Honours ==
Bo'ness F.C.

- Scottish Second Division winners: 1926–27
