= Ardencaple Park =

Former stadium in Argyll and Bute, Scotland

- Location within Argyll and Bute
- Location: Helensburgh, Scotland
- Coordinates: 56.0126°N 4.7518°W
- Surface: Grass
- Record attendance: 1,500

Tenant
- Helensburgh F.C.

Ardencaple Park was a football ground in Helensburgh, Scotland. It was the home ground of Helensburgh F.C. during their time in the Scottish Football League.

== History ==
Helensburgh were elected to the new Third Division of the Scottish Football League in 1923, and the first SFL match played at Ardencaple on 18 August 1923 saw Helensburgh lose 1–0 to Arthurlie in front of 1,000 spectators. The probable record attendance of 1,500 was set during the following season when Helensburgh played Bo'ness in the first round of the Scottish Cup.

Helensburgh left the SFL in 1926 when the Third Division was disbanded, and folded in 1928. The last SFL match at the ground was played on 17 April 1926, with Helensburgh beating Montrose 5–1. Ardencaple Park is now part of the grounds of Helensburgh Cricket and Rugby Football Club.
