= 1928–29 Scottish Football League =

Scottish football season

Statistics of the Scottish Football League in season 1928–29.

== Scottish League Division One ==
Pos	Team	Pld	W	D	L	GF	GA	GD	Pts
1	Rangers	38	30	7	1	107	32	+75	67
2	Celtic	38	22	7	9	67	44	+23	51
3	Motherwell	38	20	10	8	85	66	+19	50
4	Heart of Midlothian	38	19	9	10	91	57	+34	47
5	Queen's Park	38	18	7	13	100	69	+31	43
6	Partick Thistle	38	17	7	14	91	70	+21	41
7	Aberdeen	38	16	8	14	81	68	+13	40
8	St Mirren	38	16	8	14	78	75	+3	40
9	St Johnstone	38	14	10	14	57	70	−13	38
10	Kilmarnock	38	14	8	16	79	74	+5	36
11	Falkirk	38	14	8	16	68	86	−18	36
12	Hamilton Academical	38	13	9	16	58	83	−25	35
13	Cowdenbeath	38	14	5	19	55	69	−14	33
14	Hibernian	38	13	6	19	54	62	−8	32
15	Airdrieonians	38	12	7	19	56	65	−9	31
16	Ayr United	38	12	7	19	65	84	−19	31
17	Clyde	38	12	6	20	47	71	−24	30
18	Dundee	38	9	11	18	59	59	0	29
19	Third Lanark	38	10	6	22	71	102	−31	26
20	Raith Rovers	38	9	6	23	52	105	−53	24

== Scottish League Division Two ==
Pos	Team	Pld	W	D	L	GF	GA	GD	Pts	Promotion or relegation
1	Dundee United	36	24	3	9	99	55	+44	51	Promotion to the 1929–30 First Division
2	Morton	36	21	8	7	85	49	+36	50	Promotion to the 1929–30 First Division
3	Arbroath	36	19	9	8	90	60	+30	47	
4	Albion Rovers	36	18	8	10	95	67	+28	44	
5	Leith Athletic	36	18	7	11	78	56	+22	43	
6	St Bernard's	36	16	9	11	77	55	+22	41	
7	Forfar Athletic	35	14	10	11	69	75	−6	38	
8	East Fife	35	15	6	14	88	77	+11	36	
9	Queen of the South	36	16	4	16	86	79	+7	36	
10	Bo'ness	35	15	5	15	62	62	0	35	
11	Dunfermline Athletic	36	13	7	16	66	72	−6	33	
12	East Stirlingshire	36	14	4	18	71	75	−4	32	
13	Alloa Athletic	36	12	7	17	64	77	−13	31	
14	Dumbarton	36	11	9	16	59	78	−19	31	
15	King's Park	36	8	13	15	60	84	−24	29	
16	Clydebank	36	11	5	20	70	85	−15	27	
17	Arthurlie	32	9	7	16	51	73	−22	25	Resigned, fixtures stand
18	Stenhousemuir	35	9	6	20	51	90	−39	24	
19	Armadale	36	8	7	21	47	99	−52	23	
20	Bathgate	0	0	0	0	0	0	0	0	Resigned, fixtures expunged

== See also ==
- 1928–29 in Scottish football
