= 1925–26 Scottish Division Two =

Scottish Second Division
- Season: 1925–26
- Champions: Dunfermline Athletic
- Promoted: Dunfermline Athletic; Clyde

The 1925–26 Scottish Second Division was won by Dunfermline Athletic who, along with second placed Clyde, were promoted to the First Division. Broxburn United finished bottom.

== Table ==
Pos	Team	Pld	W	D	L	GF	GA	GD	Pts	Promotion or relegation
1	Dunfermline Athletic	38	26	7	5	109	43	+66	59	Promotion to the 1926–27 First Division
2	Clyde	38	24	5	9	87	50	+37	53	Promotion to the 1926–27 First Division
3	Ayr United	38	20	12	6	77	39	+38	52	
4	East Fife	38	20	9	9	98	73	+25	49	
5	Stenhousemuir	38	19	10	9	74	52	+22	48	
6	Third Lanark	38	19	8	11	72	47	+25	46	
7	Arthurlie	38	17	5	16	81	75	+6	39	
8	Bo'ness	38	17	5	16	66	70	−4	39	
9	Albion Rovers	38	16	6	16	78	71	+7	38	
10	Arbroath	38	17	4	17	80	73	+7	38	
11	Dumbarton	38	14	10	14	54	78	−24	38	
12	Nithsdale Wanderers	38	15	7	16	78	82	−4	37	
13	King's Park	38	14	9	15	67	73	−6	37	
14	St Bernard's	38	15	5	18	86	82	+4	35	
15	Armadale	38	14	5	19	82	101	−19	33	
16	Alloa Athletic	38	11	8	19	54	63	−9	30	
17	Queen Of The South	38	10	8	20	64	88	−24	28	
18	East Stirlingshire	38	10	7	21	59	89	−30	27	
19	Bathgate	38	7	6	25	60	105	−45	20	
20	Broxburn United	38	4	6	28	55	127	−72	14	Left the League
