= 1925–26 Scottish Football League =

Scottish football season

Statistics of the Scottish Football League in season 1925–26.

== Scottish League Division One ==
Pos	Team	Pld	W	D	L	GF	GA	GD	Pts
1	Celtic	38	25	8	5	97	40	+57	58
2	Airdrieonians	38	23	4	11	95	54	+41	50
3	Heart of Midlothian	38	21	8	9	87	56	+31	50
4	St Mirren	38	20	7	11	63	52	+11	47
5	Motherwell	38	19	8	11	67	46	+21	46
6	Rangers	38	19	6	13	79	55	+24	44
7	Cowdenbeath	38	18	6	14	87	68	+19	42
8	Falkirk	38	14	14	10	61	57	+4	42
9	Kilmarnock	38	17	7	14	79	77	+2	41
10	Dundee	38	14	9	15	47	59	−12	37
11	Aberdeen	38	13	10	15	49	54	−5	36
12	Hamilton Academical	38	13	9	16	68	79	−11	35
13	Queen's Park	38	15	4	19	70	81	−11	34
14	Partick Thistle	38	10	13	15	64	73	−9	33
15	Morton	38	12	7	19	57	84	−27	31
16	Hibernian	38	12	6	20	72	77	−5	30
17	Dundee United	38	11	6	21	52	74	−22	28
18	St Johnstone	38	9	10	19	43	78	−35	28
19	Raith Rovers	38	11	4	23	46	81	−35	26
20	Clydebank	38	7	8	23	55	92	−37	22

Source: "1925-1926 Division 1 - SPFL Archive". SPFL.

== Scottish League Division Two ==
Pos	Team	Pld	W	D	L	GF	GA	GD	Pts	Promotion or relegation
1	Dunfermline Athletic	38	26	7	5	109	43	+66	59	Promotion to the 1926–27 First Division
2	Clyde	38	24	5	9	87	50	+37	53	Promotion to the 1926–27 First Division
3	Ayr United	38	20	12	6	77	39	+38	52	
4	East Fife	38	20	9	9	98	73	+25	49	
5	Stenhousemuir	38	19	10	9	74	52	+22	48	
6	Third Lanark	38	19	8	11	72	47	+25	46	
7	Arthurlie	38	17	5	16	81	75	+6	39	
8	Bo'ness	38	17	5	16	66	70	−4	39	
9	Albion Rovers	38	16	6	16	78	71	+7	38	
10	Arbroath	38	17	4	17	80	73	+7	38	
11	Dumbarton	38	14	10	14	54	78	−24	38	
12	Nithsdale Wanderers	38	15	7	16	78	82	−4	37	
13	King's Park	38	14	9	15	67	73	−6	37	
14	St Bernard's	38	15	5	18	86	82	+4	35	
15	Armadale	38	14	5	19	82	101	−19	33	
16	Alloa Athletic	38	11	8	19	54	63	−9	30	
17	Queen Of The South	38	10	8	20	64	88	−24	28	
18	East Stirlingshire	38	10	7	21	59	89	−30	27	
19	Bathgate	38	7	6	25	60	105	−45	20	
20	Broxburn United	38	4	6	28	55	127	−72	14	

== Scottish League Division Three ==
Pos	Team	Pld	W	D	L	GF	GA	GR	Pts	Promotion or relegation
1	Helensburgh	30	16	6	8	66	47	1.404	38	
2	Leith Athletic	29	16	5	8	73	41	1.780	37	
3	Forfar Athletic (P)	28	16	3	9	61	42	1.452	35	Elected to the 1926–27 Scottish Division Two
4	Dykehead	28	14	5	9	62	47	1.319	33	
5	Royal Albert	28	16	1	11	75	61	1.230	33	
6	Mid-Annandale	29	14	3	12	50	54	0.926	31	
7	Vale of Leven	26	14	2	10	78	55	1.418	30	
8	Montrose	26	12	3	11	56	58	0.966	27	
9	Lochgelly United	29	9	9	11	58	63	0.921	27	
10	Brechin City	28	12	3	13	67	73	0.918	27	
11	Solway Star	29	9	6	14	50	62	0.806	24	
12	Beith	27	9	4	14	58	68	0.853	22	
13	Johnstone	29	7	6	16	55	74	0.743	20	
14	Peebles Rovers	26	9	0	17	52	76	0.684	18	
15	Clackmannan	25	5	8	12	42	74	0.568	18	
16	Galston	15	4	4	7	38	46	0.826	12	

Source: statto.com
Rules for classification: Teams are ranked by points then goal average. Points system: 2 points for a win, 1 point for a draw, 0 points for a loss
(P) Promoted

== See also ==
- 1925–26 in Scottish football
