= Chapelhill Park =

Association football pitch in Clackmannan, Scotland

- Location within Clackmannanshire
- Location: Clackmannan, Scotland
- Coordinates: 56.1034°N 3.7489°W
- Surface: Grass

Construction
- Opened: 1886

Tenant
- Clackmannan F.C. (1886–1931)

Chapelhill Park was a football ground in Clackmannan, Scotland. It was the home ground of Clackmannan F.C. from 1886 until the club folded in 1931.

== History ==
Clackmannan F.C. moved to Chapelhill Park in 1886, and built a pavilion in the south-west corner of the ground in 1892. In 1921 the club were elected to Division Two of the Scottish Football League, and subsequently erected a 400-seat stand.

The first SFL match at Chapelhill Park was played on 27 August 1921, with Clackmannan beaten 2–1 by Alloa Athletic in front of 3,500 spectators, which remained the club's highest recorded home attendance during their time in the league. After dropping out of the SFL at the end of the 1921–22 season, the club returned to the SFL when they joined Division Three in 1923. In 1925 Chapelhill Park was closed by the authorities following crowd trouble at a Scottish Qualifying Cup match between Clackmannan and Peebles Rovers, which had been played at Central Park in Cowdenbeath. As a result, Clackmannan's home match against Brechin City on 15 November was played at Recreation Park in nearby Alloa.

When the division was disbanded at the end of the 1925–26 season the club left the league for a second time. The final SFL match at Chapelhill Park was played on 24 April 1926, a 3–3 draw with Leith Athletic. Clackmannan folded in 1931, but the ground remained in use until after World War II, before the site was used for housing. A road through the estate was named Chapelhill.
