= John Harvie (footballer) =

Scottish footballer

Personal information
- Place of birth: Duntocher, Scotland
- Position: Wing half

Senior career*
Years	Team	Apps	(Gls)
- Benburb
1915–1920	Falkirk	137	(23)
1920–1925	Clydebank	48	(3)
1922	→ Kilmarnock (loan)	6	(0)
1923–1924	→ Johnstone (loan)	41	(15)
1925	Johnstone	10	(3)
1925–1929	Dumbarton	116	(11)
1929–1931	Clydebank	47	(7)
Total		405	(62)
- * Club domestic league appearances and goals

John Harvie was a Scottish footballer who played for Falkirk, Clydebank, Johnstone and Dumbarton during the 1910s and 1920s, mainly as a wing half. He also had a short loan spell with Kilmarnock.
