= Mill Park, Bathgate =

Football ground in Bathgate, Scotland

Mill Park
- Location within West Lothian
- Location: Bathgate, Scotland
- Coordinates: 55.9043°N 3.6462°W
- Record attendance: 8,000
- Surface: Grass
- Opened: 1902

Tenants
- Bathgate F.C. (1902–1938)

Mill Park was a football ground in Bathgate, Scotland. It was the home ground of Bathgate Football Club from 1902 until they folded in 1938.

== History ==
Bathgate Football Club moved to Mill Park in 1902. The ground was initially an enclosed field with embankments on either side of the pitch, but a grandstand was later erected.

In 1921 Bathgate were elected into Division Two of the Scottish Football League, and the first SFL match was played at Mill Park on 27 August 1921, a 0–0 draw with local rivals Armadale in front of 4,000 spectators. The club's highest recorded league attendance occurred later in the season when 5,000 watched a 0–0 draw with Alloa Athletic on 2 January 1922. Just over a month later the ground's probable record attendance was set when 8,000 attended a 1–0 win against Falkirk in the second round of the Scottish Cup on 11 February 1922.

The record league attendance was equalled the following season when a crowd of 5,000 watched a 4–2 win over Armadale on 1 January 1923. The overall record of 8,000 was equalled for a Scottish Cup third round match against Airdrieonians on 20 February 1926, with the visitors winning 5–2.

Midway through the 1928–29 season the club resigned from the SFL; their last home match was a 3–1 defeat by King's Park on 16 February 1929; the attendance of 200 was the club's lowest recorded attendance during their time in the SFL. The club was dissolved in 1938 and the site was subsequently used for housing.
