= Crawick Holm =

Football ground in Sanquhar, Scotland

- Location within Dumfries and Galloway
- Location: Sanquhar, Scotland
- Coordinates: 55.3740°N 3.9364°W
- Surface: Grass
- Record attendance: 4,200

Construction
- Opened: 1920

Tenant
- Nithsdale Wanderers

Crawick Holm was a football ground in Sanquhar, Scotland. It was the home ground of Nithsdale Wanderers.

== History ==
Nithsdale Wanderers moved to Crawick Holm in 1920, the ground being located next to Crawick Water.

The club were elected into the new Third Division of the Scottish Football League in 1923, and the first SFL match at Crawick Holm was played on 25 August 1923, a 5–0 win over Brechin City in front of 1,100 spectators. The ground's probable record attendance was set a few weeks later when a crowd of 4,200 watched a 3–2 defeat by Queen of the South in a Scottish Qualifying Cup second-round game. The club's highest recorded league attendance of 1,500 was set the following week for another match against Queen of the South on 23 September, with the match ending in a 1–1 draw.

The club left the SFL at the end of the 1926–27 season after finishing bottom of Division Two; the final SFL match at the ground was played on 30 April 1927, a 4–3 defeat by Clydebank with 1,000 in attendance. The site was still used for football in the 1990s, but was subsequently used to build an industrial warehouse.
