= Sports Park, Broxburn =

Former football ground

Sports Park
- Location within West Lothian
- Location: Broxburn, Scotland
- Coordinates: 55.9364°N 3.4676°W
- Record attendance: 9,000
- Surface: Grass
- Opened: 1914
- Closed: 1932

Tenants
- Broxburn United

Sports Park was a football ground in Broxburn, West Lothian in Scotland. It was the home ground of Broxburn United.

== History ==
Broxburn United moved to Sports Park in 1914. The club were admitted to Division Two of the Scottish Football League in 1921, and the first SFL match was played at the ground on 20 August 1921, a 3–2 win over Dunfermline Athletic watched by 3,500 spectators.

In 1922 a 400-seat grandstand was erected at the ground. The probable record attendance of 7,000 was set for a Scottish Cup third round match against Falkirk on 21 February 1925. The highest league attendance Broxburn recorded was 4,000 for a 0–0 draw against Stenhousemuir on 3 September 1921 and again for another 0–0 draw with Queen's Park on 6 October 1922.

The club's lowest recorded SFL attendance was 500 for a 4–3 defeat against Armadale on 24 April 1926, a game which also turned out to be the club's final match in the SFL, as the Third Division was disbanded at the end of the 1925–26 season.

In 1932 the club folded and most of the site was later used for the car park for the adjacent sports centre.
