= Dunterlie Park =

Football ground in Barrhead, Scotland

- Location within East Renfrewshire
- Location: Barrhead, Scotland
- Coordinates: 55.8035°N 4.3952°W
- Capacity: 3,000
- Surface: Grass
- Record attendance: 10,500

Construction
- Opened: 1919

Tenant
- Arthurlie

Dunterlie Park is a football ground in Barrhead, Scotland. The third stadium to bear the name, it is the home ground of Arthurlie.

== History ==
Arthurlie moved to Dunterlie Park in 1919, naming it after their former ground, where they had been based since 1906, having previously been based at the original Dunterlie Park. Located on the south-eastern side of Barrhead railway station line, the ground originally had a pavilion in the northern corner of the pitch and banking behind the southern goal and on the western side of the pitch. As the club was excluded from the restart of the Scottish Football League following World War I, they were unable to rejoin until 1923, and the first SFL match was not played at the new Dunterlie Park until 25 August 1923, a 3–2 defeat to East Stirlingshire.

Following crowd trouble during the 2–1 defeat by Third Lanark on 22 August, the ground was closed for a month, with Arthurlie having to play home matches at Beith's Bellsdale Park. On 1 October 1927 Arthurlie's Owen McNally set a SFL record at the ground by scoring eight goals in a 10–1 win over Armadale.

Towards the end of the 1928–29 season the club dropped out of the SFL due to financial difficulties. The last SFL game was played at Dunterlie Park on 30 March 1929, a 1–1 draw with St Bernard's. The club later folded later in the year, reforming as Arthurlie Amateurs, and again as Arthurlie in 1930, with the new club continuing to play at Dunterlie Park in Junior football. The ground's record attendance of 10,500 was set on 18 March 1939 for a Scottish Junior Cup sixth round match with Cambuslang Rangers, which Arthurlie lost 2–1.
