= Volunteer Park, Armadale =

Football ground in Armadale, Scotland

Volunteer Park
- Location within West Lothian
- Location: Armadale, Scotland
- Coordinates: 55.9002°N 3.7002°W
- Capacity: 3,000
- Surface: Grass
- Record attendance: 12,600

Construction
- Opened: 1881

Tenants
- Armadale Volunteers (1887–1900) first Armadale (1889–1894) second Armadale (1910–1935); Armadale Thistle (1936–)

Volunteer Park is a football ground in Armadale, West Lothian, Scotland. It is the home ground of Armadale Thistle, and was used by several of the town's previous clubs, including Armadale F.C., who played Scottish Football League matches there between 1921 and 1933. The ground also hosted greyhound racing during the 1930s.

== History ==
Around 1880, C Company of the Royal Scots Volunteer Battalion moved to Armadale from Torphichen, and began training at Volunteer field on North Street. In 1881 Armadale Stars requested to use the site as a football pitch, and were allowed to do so on the condition that they joined the Volunteers. As a result, the club was renamed Armadale Volunteers. There is however no record of the club playing before 1887.

Volunteer field subsequently became Volunteer Park. In 1889 the original Armadale club also adopted the ground, playing there until their disbandment in 1894.

In 1910 a new Armadale F.C. were formed, and took over Volunteer Park. Over the next five years a pavilion with a small stand was built on the eastern side of the pitch and a 200-seat grandstand erected on the western side. Embankments were also built around the pitch. On 19 February 1921 the ground's probable record attendance of 12,600 was set for a Scottish Cup third round match against Albion Rovers. The west stand was demolished and replaced with a new 700-capacity stand in the same year. This later burnt down in the mid-1930s.

Later in 1921 the club were admitted to Division Two of the Scottish Football League. The first SFL match was played at Volunteer Park on 20 August, a 3–0 win against St Bernard's. The crowd of 4,000 remained Armadale's highest recorded league attendance. In the 1930s the ground was used for whippet racing. By then the Volunteer Park pitch had become known as one of the worst in the SFL. Financial problems led to the club being expelled from the SFL during the 1933–34 season, their last home match in the league being a 5–1 defeat to Raith Rovers on 19 November 1933. The crowd of just 300 (the same as that for the 2–0 defeat to Alloa Athletic on 5 November) was their lowest recorded league attendance.

The club folded in 1935, and a new club, Armadale Thistle, was formed in 1936, taking over Volunteer Park. A covered seated stand was built in 1950, and the club installed floodlights at the ground in 1954; the first Scottish Junior Football Association match was played under floodlights at Volunteer Park in 1956 when Thistle played Rosewell Rosedale.

The ground has also been used to host several schoolboy internationals.

== Greyhound racing ==
Racing first took place around the Volunteer Park football pitch on 3 October 1936 but only lasted until 16 February 1939. The racing was independent (unlicensed) and the track distances consisted of 225 yards and 380 yards. The greyhound operation moved to Armadale Stadium just four days later on 20 February 1939. TD Heffernan was involved in both tracks.
