= Forthbank Park =

Stadium in Stirling, Scotland

- Location within Stirling
- Location: Stirling, Scotland
- Coordinates: 56.114°N 3.929°W
- Owner: King's Park F.C.
- Operator: King's Park F.C.
- Surface: Natural Grass

Construction
- Demolished: 1940

Tenant
- King's Park F.C.

Forthbank Park was a sports venue in Stirling, Scotland until 1940. Forthbank park was home to King's Park F.C. until the beginning of World War II. During the war Forthbank was destroyed by the Luftwaffe. The ground was victim to the only German bomb strike on the town during the conflict. The majority of the stadium was damaged beyond financial repair by King's Park and was demolished. Shortly after the war King's Park closed down permanently.

== History ==
=== King's Park F.C. ===
Forthbank was the home ground of King's Park F.C. since the late 19th century until 1940 when the ground was destroyed. King's Park also hosted other sporting events at the ground, mostly animal racing. Crowd trouble at a home match against St Johnstone in October 1921 led to King's Park playing a home match against Vale of Leven at Dunblane's Duckburn Park.

=== Animal racing ===
Forthbank was one of a number of stadiums at the time to host animal racing. Greyhound racing started at Forthbank Park on 11 March 1932 and the track was independent (unlicensed). It was the only track in Scotland that also attempted Cheetah racing. The Scottish Football Association at the time was keen to put an end to this practice as, although the racing provided a financial lifeline to many smaller clubs including King's Park, they feared that it would lead to football becoming too reliant on gambling just like the races. An SFA inspection team deemed that the greyhound track at Forthbank encroached on to the pitch and as such it was removed, along with the source of income.

=== World War II end of an era ===
On 20 July 1940, the Luftwaffe dropped a bomb on the town of Stirling. The bomb fell on Forthbank partially destroying the stadium. King's Park made temporary repairs to the stadium and played two more games at the ground before the club was closed down. The club was finally given compensation from the War Office in 1953.

=== Stirling's future stadiums ===
This was not the end to football in Stirling as local business man Thomas Ferguson started up Stirling Albion F.C. in 1945 and shortly after purchased the Annfield estate to construct Annfield. Annfield remained the main football stadium in Stirling until 1993 when Stirling Council constructed Forthbank Stadium, on the outskirts of the town but situated about two-thirds of a mile (1 km) from the location of the original King's Park's old ground Forthbank Park.
