= Dumbarton Harp F.C. =

Association football club in West Dunbartonshire, Scotland

Dumbarton Harp
- Full name: Dumbarton Harp Football Club
- Founded: 1894
- Dissolved: 1925
- Ground: Meadow Park, Dumbarton
- 1924–25: Scottish Football League Division Three, Record expunged
Home colours

Dumbarton Harp Football Club was a football club based in the town of Dumbarton in the west of Scotland. They were formed in 1894 by Irish Catholic immigrants to the area in a similar way to the formation of Celtic in Glasgow and Hibernian in Edinburgh.

There was also a junior club at the same time as Dumbarton Harp, formed in 1906. Their first game was against "Corinthians" (probably the local "Dumbarton Corinthians" that were around at this time) on 22 August 1906, losing 2–1.

== History ==
Dumbarton Harp played the majority of their existence in local football leagues, such as the Glasgow and District Junior League, which they joined in their inaugural season, or the Inter County Football League in season 1916–17. In 1910 they were champions of the Scottish Football Union which they left in 1912 to participate in the Scottish Reserve Football League. They did play for a short spell in the Scottish Football League when it expanded to a three division set up in the 1920s. They finished tenth (out of 16 clubs) in the inaugural Division Three in the 1923–24 season, but withdrew midway through the 1924–25 season when it became clear they could not meet their financial commitments, and were disbanded.

== Ground ==
Dumbarton Harp played at Meadow Park in the centre of the town, close to Dumbarton Central railway station. The site of Meadow Park is now occupied by industrial buildings.

== Colours ==
- 1894?–1909: Green shirts, white shorts, green socks
- 1909–1910: Green and white hooped shirts, white shorts, green socks
- 1910–1919: Green shirts, white shorts, green socks
- 1919–1925: Green shirts with a white hoop, green shorts, black socks

== Legacy ==
The name Dumbarton Harp lives on as a Celtic Supporters Club, and also as a local amateur football club of the same name.

== Honours ==
- Scottish Union:
  - Champions: 1909–10
- Inter County League:
  - Champions: 1916–17
- Dumbartonshire Cup:
  - Winners: 1909–10, 1911–12, 1912–13
- Dumbartonshire Charity Cup:
  - Winners: 1918–19
