= Helensburgh F.C. =

Former association football club in Scotland

Helensburgh
- Full name: Helensburgh Football Club
- Nickname: The Burgh
- Founded: 1896
- Dissolved: 1928
- Ground: Ardencaple Park, Helensburgh
Home colours

Helensburgh Football Club was a Scottish football club based in Helensburgh. They were members of the Scottish Football League Third Division between 1923 and 1926.

== History ==
The first club of the name first appeared in 1874 but it disappeared in 1882; Helensburgh Victoria, founded in 1880, were renamed Helensburgh FC on 31 July 1885 but had disbanded by the end of the season. A third incarnation was born in 1896 and eventually took up residence at the town's Ardencaple Park.

Helensburgh eventually joined the Western League, which was incorporated by the Scottish Football League as its new Third Division for the 1923–24 season. Helensburgh competed in each of the Division's three seasons, finishing fifteenth in 1923–24, seventh in 1924–25 and first in 1925–26, although no championship was awarded because Helensburgh were the only club to complete their fixtures. In a normal year Helensburgh may have gained promotion to the Second Division, but the club's application for election to the League was unsuccessful. A brief stopover in the Scottish Football Alliance preceded their demise in 1928.

== Stadium ==
- 1896–1928: Ardencaple Park

== Colours ==
The club originally played in navy shirts and white shorts, changing in 1907 to red shirts with navy shorts and socks. Apart from a brief change to red and white stripes in 1910, these remained the club's colours for the rest of its existence.
