= Clackmannan F.C. =

Association football club in Scotland

Clackmannan
- Full name: Clackmannan Football Club
- Nickname(s): the Wee County, the County Lads
- Founded: 1885
- Dissolved: 1931
- Ground: Chapelhill Park, Clackmannan
Home colours

Clackmannan Football Club was a football club based in Clackmannan, Scotland. They were members of the Scottish Football League in two spells, both during the 1920s, and played at Chapelhill Park. Players wore blue and white hoops.

== History ==
The club was formed in 1885, initially playing at Tower Park and Glebe Park, before settling at Chapelhill Park in 1886. They joined the Midland Football League in 1891. Later that year they inflicted Dunfermline Athletic's record defeat, 17–2. They won the league in 1896–97, but left to join the Central Football Combination in 1898, where they played until 1901. After folding in 1904, the club was reformed in 1907, and rejoined the Midland League in 1908. Between 1912 and 1914 they played in the Eastern League, before joining the Central League in 1914.

In 1921 the club were elected to Division Two of the Scottish Football League, when the Central League clubs formed most of the division. However, it was unrealistic for a town of only 3,000 people to sustain a league club, and after finishing bottom of the table in the 1921–22 season, left to rejoin the Eastern League. The club attempted to rejoin Division Two for the 1923–24 season, but an overly optimistic campaign for election to the division was unsuccessful. Clackmannan instead gained admission to the new Third Division.

The club would have finished bottom of Division Three in the 1925–26 season, had Galston not withdrawn halfway through the season. The division was disbanded at the end of the season, having proved unsustainable due to financial difficulties, ending the club's SFL membership. They subsequently folded in 1931.

Between 1962 and 1995, another club called Clackmannan F.C. played Junior football in the Fife League.
