= Nithsdale Wanderers F.C. =

Association football club in Scotland

Nithsdale Wanderers
- Full name: Nithsdale Wanderers Football Club
- Founded: 2001
- Ground: Lorimer Park, Sanquhar
- Capacity: 1,000
- Coordinates: 55°22′12″N 3°55′54″W
- Manager: Danny Naismith
- League: South of Scotland League
- 2025–26: South of Scotland League, 9th of 11
Home colours	Away colours

Nithsdale Wanderers Football Club are a Scottish football club based in Sanquhar, Dumfries and Galloway. Their home ground is Lorimer Park and they currently play in the South of Scotland Football League. It was also the name of a previous club from the town, who were in membership of the Scottish Football League from 1923 to 1927.

== History ==
=== Original club ===
Nithsdale Wanderers originally formed in 1897 and enjoyed a measure of local success in their early years. The 1920s would see them achieve their highest level of national prominence. The decade began with them moving to a new ground at Crawick Holm. In the 1923–24 season, they were one of the clubs invited to join the Scottish League's new Third Division. Although this competition would exist only for three seasons and would have terrible economic consequences for many of its clubs, Nithsdale Wanderers were to thrive, albeit briefly, on their newfound status.

In 1924–25, Wanderers won the Third Division championship, clinching the title with an 8–0 victory over Montrose in the final match of the season. Although they finished comfortably mid-table in their début season in the Second Division, the 1926–27 season saw them finish bottom and they had to seek re-election to the league (by this time Division Three was no more). They were unsuccessful and the brief league career of Nithsdale Wanderers was at an end. They continued to compete in local senior competitions, including the Southern Counties League and the South of Scotland League, and occasionally qualified for the Scottish Cup (suffering a 14–0 defeat against Dundee United in the 1930–31 competition).

In 1951, the club dropped down to the junior grades, but continued to struggle, finally going out of existence in 1964.

=== Modern club ===
After a gap of 37 years, the name of Nithsdale Wanderers was revived when the new club successfully applied for membership of the South of Scotland Football League in 2001. Their biggest impact on the competition to date was finishing in second place in the 2006–07 season. As they are only associate members of the SFA, they are only eligible to compete in the Scottish Cup in the event of them winning the league. The team's home colours are blue and white.

== Honours ==
=== Original club ===
- Scottish Football League
  - Division Three champions 1924–25
- Scottish Football Combination
  - Champions 1909–10
- Southern Counties Challenge Cup
  - Winners 1903–04, 1906–07, 1910–11, 1911–12, 1913–14, 1919–20, 1921–22, 1922–23, 1927–28, 1945–46
- Potts Cup
  - Winners 1902–03, 1905–06, 1908–09, 1909–10, 1913–14, 1919–20, 1922–23
- Southern Counties Charity Cup
  - Winners 1910–11, 1912–13
- South of Scotland Cup
  - Winners 1912–13

=== Modern club ===
- South of Scotland League
  - Runners-up: 2006–07
- Haig Gordon Memorial Trophy
  - Winners: 2008–09
- Wigtownshire & District FA Tweedie Cup
  - Winners: 2016–17
- Southern Counties FA Alba Cup
  - Winners: 2021–22, 2023–24
