= Bo'ness F.C. =

Former association football club in Scotland

Bo'ness
- Full name: Bo'ness Football Club
- Nickname(s): the Half Nabs, the Blues
- Founded: 1878
- Dissolved: 1945
- Ground: Newtown Park, Bo'ness
Home colours

Bo'ness Football Club was a football club based in Bo'ness, Scotland. The club was a member of the Scottish Football League from 1921 to November 1932, and played at Newtown Park. Their home kit consisted of royal blue shirts and white shorts.

== History ==
The club claimed a foundation date of 1881, although there is reference to a Bo'ness Football Club existing in 1878. The earliest record of a match is of a pair of fixtures against the Grasshoppers club's second XI of Bonnybridge in late 1881. The club moved to Newtown Park in 1886, opening the ground with a fixture against Dumbarton F.C., losing 4–0.

It joined the Eastern Football Alliance in 1891, but the league failed to complete its first season. After winning the East of Scotland Shield in 1894–95, Bo'ness returned to competitive league football in 1901 as a member of the Central Football Combination and eventually ended up in the Central Football League. Along with much of the membership of the group, Bo'ness were admitted to the newly expanded Scottish Football League Second Division in 1921. After five seasons of mid-table finishes, the club won the Second Division championship in 1927 and were promoted to the First Division.

The club was relegated back to the Second Division after just one season. Bo'ness then struggled financially, like many other clubs in the region, due to the decline of the local coal and shale oil industries. Bo'ness offered free admission to local unemployed people after 30 minutes of play. The club struggled to raise the £50 match guarantee to visiting clubs in 1931, but was surprisingly re-elected. The failure to pay the match guarantees to Stenhousemuir F.C. and Brechin City F.C. in October 1932 meant that the club was expelled from the League; the blame was put on "industrial depression and the opposition of dog racing in neighbouring towns". The club had an overdraft at the time of £500 and the club's record of 4 wins, 2 draws, and 8 defeats was expunged.

Bo'ness continued as a non-league side until 1939, appearing in the Scottish Football Alliance, Edinburgh and District League, Scottish Football Combination and the East of Scotland Football League. Future Scotland international Alex Munro also came through the ranks at this time. The club survived World War II but merged with local side Bo'ness Cadora to form junior club Bo'ness United in 1945.

== Stadium ==
- 1881–1885: Field at site of Parish church
- 1885–1886: Soo Cra Park
- 1886–1945: Newtown Park.

== Scottish Football League record ==
Season	Division	P	W	D	L	F	A	Pts	Pos
1921–22	Division Two	38	16	7	15	56	49	39	6th
1922–23	Division Two	38	12	17	9	48	46	41	7th
1923–24	Division Two	38	13	11	14	45	53	37	13th
1924–25	Division Two	38	16	9	13	71	48	41	6th
1925–26	Division Two	38	17	5	16	66	70	39	8th
1926–27	Division Two ↑	38	23	10	5	86	41	55	1st
1927–28	Division One ↓	38	9	8	21	48	86	26	19th
1928–29	Division Two	35	15	5	15	62	62	35	10th
1929–30	Division Two	38	15	4	19	67	95	34	13th
1930–31	Division Two	38	9	4	25	54	100	22	20th
1931–32	Division Two	38	15	4	19	70	103	34	14th
1932–33	Division Two	0	0	0	0	0	0	0	— (Note: Bo'ness did not complete the 1932–33 season and their results were expunged from the records.)

== Notable former players ==
Players at the club who were also full internationals:

- (Scotland) George Allan
- (Scotland) Willie MacFadyen
- (Scotland) Alex Munro
- (Republic of Ireland) Christy Martin
