= Bathgate F.C. =

Former association football club in Scotland

Bathgate
- Full name: Bathgate Football Club
- Nickname(s): the Maroons
- Founded: 1893
- Dissolved: 1938
- Ground: Mill Park, Bathgate
Home colours

Bathgate Football Club was a football club based at Mill Park in Bathgate, Scotland. The club was a member of the Scottish Football League from 1921 until 1929.

== History ==
The club was formed in 1893, as the result of a merger of Bathgate Rovers F.C. and Bathgate Athletic F.C., the latter club having split out of the former club at the start of the 1892–93 season, and as a result crippling both clubs. Rovers, who played at Boghead Park, allowed its lease over to expire at the end of the 1892–93 season. Consequently, a meeting was held at the Bathgate Institute, with a view to forming a new club for the town, and it was agreed to set up a fresh club, under the name Bathgate, which would endeavour (successfully) to re-gain use of Boghead, and which was made up of Rovers and Athletic players.

The new club joined the Central Football League and other minor leagues, and moved to Mill Park in 1902. Bathgate returned to the Central League in 1919 and were one of several clubs incorporated into the Scottish Football League Division Two in 1921. The club initially performed well in Division Two, coming close to promotion in 1923–24.

Bathgate soon found themselves dogged by financial problems, however. In 1924, junior club Larkhall Thistle brought a case against Bathgate for poaching their players, as the junior clubs resented the fact senior clubs could take their players without adequate compensation. Finances were further damaged by the severe downturn in gates during the 1926 miners strike. All of the West Lothian league clubs were made unsustainable by the decline of the local coal and shale oil industries. Bathgate resigned from the league in March 1929.

The club continued in the East of Scotland Football League, playing their final fixture on 16 April 1932. The club was formally dissolved in October 1938. Bathgate has since been represented in junior football by Bathgate Thistle.

== Colours ==
- 1893–1904 Red & white striped shirts, white shorts.
- 1904–1938 Maroon shirts, white shorts.

== League record ==
Season	Pl	W	D	L	F	A	Pts	Pos
1921–22	38	16	11	11	56	41	43	5th
1922–23	38	16	9	13	67	55	41	5th
1923–24	38	16	12	10	58	49	44	3rd
1924–25	38	12	10	16	58	74	34	16th
1925–26	38	7	6	25	60	105	20	19th
1926–27	38	13	7	18	76	98	33	17th
1927–28	38	10	11	17	62	81	31	19th
1928–29	N/A	N/A	N/A	N/A	N/A	N/A	N/A	N/A

Bathgate did not complete the 1928–29 season and their results were expunged from the records.

== Players ==
- Category:Bathgate F.C. players
