= King's Park F.C. =

Scottish football club, 1875-1945

King's Park
- Full name: King's Park Football Club
- Nickname: K.P.
- Founded: 1875
- Dissolved: 1945
- Ground: Forthbank Park, Stirling
Home colours

King's Park Football Club were a football club who played in the Scottish Football League (SFL) before the Second World War. Based in Stirling, they joined the League in the 1921–22 season, following the reintroduction of the Second Division and were one of 11 new members for that season.

== History ==
The club was established in 1875 in the King's Park area of Stirling, although they did not stay long in this locality. They first entered the Scottish Cup in the 1879–80 season. Their best performance in that competition was in 1894–95 when they reached the quarter finals, losing 4–2 to Hearts.

King's Park were founder members of the Scottish Football Alliance, a rival of sorts of the SFL, in 1891 but left after one season. They moved between various more minor leagues for several seasons before entering the re-established Central Football League in 1909, retaining their membership of this division until 1921 (barring a brief hiatus during the First World War when they did not compete). At this point King's Park, along with most of their fellow Central league clubs, were invited to join the newly established Second Division of the SFL.

Their finest season came in 1927–28, when they just missed promotion by one point. Their record victory was in a 12–2 league victory against Forfar Athletic on 2 January 1930. In this game Jim Dyet scored eight of the club's goals, a feat made all the more remarkable by the fact that it was his debut for the club. Indeed, Dyet's feat stands as the British record for goals on a debut to this day. The club's other great goalscorer of the 1930s was Alex Haddow, who hit five consecutive league hat-tricks in January and February 1932. Although overall they failed to make much impact on the league, they were four times winners of the Stirlingshire Cup.

Although a middle-ranking Second Division club King's Park did at times make the headlines. Their league game against Dundee Hibernian on 20 October 1923 would be the last game that club would play under that name, they were renamed Dundee United two days later. The club became the centre of controversy in 1927 when a newspaper report suggested that their next opponents Clydebank were about to go out of business and as a consequence the attendance at the match was minimal. As a consequence, King's Park held back Clydebank's cut of the gate until the Scottish League intervened. Although the issue was resolved it helped to increase support amongst the League administrators for cutting the number of clubs due to their volatile status.

=== The death of King's Park and the birth of Stirling Albion ===
When World War II started King's Park, largely as a consequence of their geographical location, dropped out of competitive football. Nonetheless, the club continued to play friendlies and, like a number of Scottish clubs who could offer higher war-time wages than their English counterparts, welcomed a number of high-profile guest players including Andy Black and Bill Shankly. The club was persuaded in 1940 to join a new Midland League for the coming season although local powerhouses Dundee declined to compete and so the league did not happen. As a consequence, managing director Tom Fergusson put the club on hiatus in what was intended to be a temporary measure.

The fortunes of the club were hit further in 1940 when Forthbank was bombed by the Luftwaffe. The club did not play again after this, even though they applied to join the Northeastern League in 1944 (a request rejected due to their lack of a ground).

Amid allegations of financial impropriety with regards to payment of guest players, the club folded before the end of the war, on the pretext of the damage done by the bomb. Football in the town did not disappear for long however as they were replaced by Stirling Albion, with ex managing director Tom Fergusson taking a leading role in the new club.

Although they had not played since 1940 King's Park were not officially wound up until 1953 when the War Office finally settled their claim for the bomb damage.

== Colours ==
The club's traditional colours were maroon and white striped shirts, with shorts varying between black and white. The club adopted maroon and white for the first time in 1883 (as maroon jerseys and white knickers); beforehand the club mostly wore dark blue jerseys and knickers, with a red stripe on the latter.

== Stadium ==
The club's Forthbank Park was one of a number of stadiums at the time to host animal racing, usually greyhounds but also cheetahs. The Scottish Football Association at the time was keen to put an end to this practice as, although the racing provided a financial lifeline to many smaller clubs including King's Park, they feared that it would lead to football becoming too reliant on gambling just like the races. An SFA inspection team deemed that the greyhound track at Forthbank encroached on to the pitch and as such it was removed, along with the source of income.

Crowd trouble at a home match against St Johnstone in October 1921 led to King's Park playing a home match against Vale of Leven at Dunblane's Duckburn Park.

Forthbank suffered from a Luftwaffe bombing on 20 July 1940 and although temporary repairs were made to the partially destroyed stadium, only two further games were played there before both Forthbank and King's Park F.C. were closed down. There was compensation given eventually from the War Office in 1953, but it was paid to Stirling Albion F.C.

Local businessman Thomas Ferguson started Stirling Albion F.C in 1945 and shortly purchased the Annfield estate to construct Annfield Stadium, which has now made way for housing once more.

In 1992 they moved to Forthbank Stadium, sited about two-thirds of a mile (1 km) from the location of the original stadium Forthbank Park.

== League history ==
- Scottish Football Alliance, 1891–92
- Midland Football League in Scotland, 1892–1897
- Central Football Combination, 1897–1904
- Scottish Football Alliance, 1905–06
- Scottish Football Union, 1906–1909
- Central Football League, 1909–1915
- Scottish Football League, 1921–1939

=== Full Scottish Football League Second Division record ===
Season	Pl	W	D	L	F	A	Pts	Pos
1921–22	38	10	12	16	47	65	32	17th
1922–23	38	14	6	18	46	60	34	12th
1923–24	38	16	10	12	67	56	42	6th
1924–25	38	15	8	15	54	46	38	10th
1925–26	38	14	9	15	67	73	37	13th
1926–27	38	13	9	16	76	75	35	12th
1927–28	38	16	12	10	84	68	44	3rd
1928–29	36	8	13	15	60	84	29	15th
1929–30	38	17	8	13	109	80	42	6th
1930–31	38	14	6	18	78	70	34	14th
1931–32	38	14	5	19	97	93	33	15th
1932–33	34	13	8	13	85	80	34	8th
1933–34	34	14	8	12	78	70	36	7th
1934–35	34	18	2	14	86	71	38	7th
1935–36	34	11	5	18	55	109	27	14th
1936–37	34	11	3	20	61	106	25	17th
1937–38	34	11	4	19	64	96	26	12th
1938–39	34	12	2	20	87	92	26	13th

Key: Pl = Games played; W = games won; D = games drew; L = games lost; F = goals scored (for); A = goals conceded (against); Pts = points (2 for a win, 1 for a draw); Pos = final position in the table.

== Club records ==
Records refer to the club's time as members of the Scottish Football League.

- Record Victory: 12–2 v Forfar Athletic League Match 2 January 1930
- Most goals scored in a season: 109, 1929–30
- Fewest goals scored in a season: 46, 1922–23
- Most goals conceded in a season: 109, 1935–36
- Fewest goals conceded in a season: 46, 1924–25
- Most wins in a season: 18, 1934–35
- Fewest wins in a season: 8, 1928–29
- Most defeats in a season: 20, 1936–37 and 1938–39
- Fewest defeats in a season: 10, 1927–28
- Most draws in a season: 13, 1928–29
- Fewest draws in a season: 2, 1938–39
- Most points in a season: 44, 1927–28
- Fewest points in a season: 25, 1936–37
- Highest finish: 3rd place, Second Division, 1927–28
- Lowest finish: 17th place (out of 18), 1936–37
- Highest attendance: 8,911 v Airdrieonians, 1924–25 Scottish Cup.

== Honours ==
=== League ===
- Midland League
  - Champions: 1892–93
- Central League
  - Champions: 1904–05
- Falkirk & District League
  - Winners: 1900–01

=== Cup ===
- Stirlingshire Cup
  - Winners: 1898–99, 1910–11, 1911–12, 1914–15, 1933–34
- Stirlingshire Consolation Cup
  - Winners: 1905–06, 1919–20, 1920–21, 1923–24
- Stirling Charity Cup
  - Winners: 1885–86, 1887–88, 1888–89, 1889–90, 1890–91, 1892–93, 1893–94, 1894–95, 1896–97, 1897–98, 1925–26, 1927–28, 1930–31, 1933–34
- Camelon Sports Tournament
  - Winners: 1889
