= Armadale F.C. =

Scottish football club, 1910–1935

Armadale
- Full name: Armadale Football Club
- Nickname: Dale
- Founded: 1910
- Dissolved: 1935
- Ground: Volunteer Park, Armadale
Home colours

Armadale Football Club were a football club based in Armadale, West Lothian in Scotland. The club was a member of the Scottish Football League from 1921 to 1932 and played at Volunteer Park.

== History ==
The club was formed on 5 August 1910 and played in the Eastern Football Alliance before joining the Central Football League in 1911. It became one of the strongest teams in this competition, winning the Central League in both 1913–14 and 1914–15. The club went on to play in the Eastern Football League, winning that competition in 1915–16, before returning to the Central League.

Football became very popular in the West Lothian mining towns in the period after the First World War. Armadale was established as a strong side: having lost narrowly to eventual winners Kilmarnock at the quarter-final stage of the Scottish Cup in 1919–20, they took the runners-up of that year, Albion Rovers, to a third replay in the 1920–21 competition.

Armadale was admitted to the newly expanded Second Division in 1921, following the absorption of the Central League. The club performed well in its first season, finishing in third place. This was not to last and Armadale consistently finished in the bottom three positions. Struggling for income at a time of high unemployment, the club suggested allowing a reduced rate of 6d for the unemployed to enter matches, but the plan was vetoed by the League. The club's form on the pitch was weak as well, with a league game against Arthurlie on 1 October 1927 seeing Owen McNally set a Scottish League record (since equalled) of scoring eight goals in a match.

To generate revenue, Armadale used Volunteer Park for greyhound racing. The League management committee issued guidance that greyhound racing tracks should not interfere with the football pitch. League officials found that the racing track covered all of the Volunteer Park pitch. The League ordered the club to cease greyhound racing, which had become their greatest source of income.

In November 1932, with the club owing Raith Rovers F.C. the compulsory £50 guarantee for the 19 November fixture (which only attracted a crowd of 300), Armadale proposed issuing I.O.U. notes for each visiting club, redeemed against the guarantees in turn owed to Armadale. This did not meet with any sympathy and the club told that, unless it paid the £50 to Raith by 4pm on 24 November, it would be expelled. The club did not do so and, despite an offer of £30 to Raith, was duly thrown out of the League; an appeal against expulsion did not proceed. The club's record of 1 win, 2 draws, and 14 defeats in the 1932–33 season - which left the club six points adrift at the bottom of the League - was expunged. Armadale was the second club expelled that season, after Bo'ness F.C. The club soon disappeared, replaced in the town by junior club Armadale Thistle.

== Colours ==
The club wore blue shirts, white shorts, and dark blue stockings for its entire existence, the shirt colour being navy blue until 1915.

== Ground ==
The club's ground was Volunteer Park, the ground of the two predecessor clubs. The club's highest reported attendance was 12,600, for a Cup tie with Albion Rovers on 19 February 1921.

== Full league record ==
Season	Pld	W	D	L	GF	GA	Pts	Pos
1921–22	38	20	5	13	64	48	45	3rd
1922–23	38	15	11	12	63	52	41	6th
1923–24	38	16	6	16	56	63	38	11th
1924–25	38	15	5	18	55	62	35	15th
1925–26	38	14	5	19	82	101	33	15th
1926–27	38	12	10	16	70	78	34	15th
1927–28	38	8	8	22	53	112	24	20th
1928–29	36	8	7	21	47	99	23	19th
1929–30	38	13	5	20	56	91	31	15th
1930–31	38	13	2	23	74	99	28	18th
1931–32	38	10	5	23	68	102	25	18th
1932–33	N/A	N/A	N/A	N/A	N/A	N/A	N/A	N/A

Key: Pld = Games played; W = games won; D = games drew; L = games lost; F = goals scored (for); A = goals conceded (against); Pts = points (2 for a win, 1 for a draw); Pos = final position in the table.

Note: Armadale did not complete the 1932–33 season and their results were expunged from the records.

== Honours ==
King Cup:

- Winners: 1929–30

Penman Cup:

- Winners: 1912–13
- Runners-up: 1917–18
