= 1912–13 Dumbarton F.C. season =

Dumbarton
1912–1913 season
- Stadium: Boghead Park, Dumbarton
- Scottish League Division Two: 6th
- Scottish Cup: Fourth round
- Top goalscorer: League: John Rowan (12); All: John Rowan (20)
Home colours

The 1912–13 season was the 36th Scottish football season in which Dumbarton competed at national level, entering the Scottish Football League, the Scottish Cup and the Scottish Qualifying Cup.

== Scottish League ==
Dumbarton's seventh successive season in the Second Division saw their worst performance since their return to league football in 1906, but still managed a 6th place finish with 29 points, 5 behind champions Ayr United.

An expansion of the First Division from 18 to 20 clubs meant that there would be at least 2 places available to Second Division clubs in the end of season election. As it was both the bottom 'top flight' clubs - Partick Thistle and Queen's Park – were to retain their places, and in addition to Ayr United, the Second Division champions, it was Dumbarton that would step up to the First Division – beating Cowdenbeath with the chairman's casting vote.

17 August 1912 Scottish League	Dumbarton	1–1	Vale of Leven	Boghead Park
	Rowan 40'		Ballantyne	Attendance: 6,000

24 August 1912 Scottish League	Johnstone	2–1	Dumbarton	Newfield Park, Johnstone
	Goal		Rowan

31 August 1912 Scottish League	Dumbarton	2–1	Dunfermline Ath	Boghead Park
	Main; Rowan		Crichton	Referee: W Johnstone

28 September 1912 Scottish League	St Bernard's	1–3	Dumbarton	Royal Gymnasium Ground
	Albert		Rowan 2'; Potter	Attendance: 1,600; Referee: A Edward

9 November 1912 Scottish League	Dumbarton	1–1	Johnstone	Boghead Park
	Rowan		McInnes	Attendance: 4,000; Referee: A Park

16 November 1912 Scottish League	Vale of Leven	0–2	Dumbarton	Millburn Park
			Potter 63'; Speedie 66'	Attendance: 4,000

23 November 1912 Scottish League	Dumbarton	0–1	E Stirling	Boghead Park
			Cooper

30 November 1912 Scottish League	Dumbarton	2–0	Dundee Hibs	Boghead Park
	Lithgow 18'			Attendance: 2,000; Referee: J Dunn

7 December 1912 Scottish League	E Stirling	3–1	Dumbarton	Merchiston Park
	Cooper; Henderson		Speedie	Attendance: 1,500; Referee: Mr Pettigrew

21 December 1912 Scottish League	Dumbarton	3–2	Albion Rovers	Boghead Park
	Ferguson, J 20'; Pender 47'; Wilson, J		Tobin 17'	Referee: Mr Kirk

28 December 1912 Scottish League	Albion Rovers	1–0	Dumbarton	Meadow Park, Coatbridge
	Tobin 25'			Referee: Mr Bloomer

1 January 1913 Scottish League	Dundee Hibs	3–3	Dumbarton	Tannadice Park
	Linn; Gallacher		Stewart 57'; Pender	Attendance: 2,000

4 January 1913 Scottish League	Dumbarton	4–0	Arthurlie	Boghead Park
	Pender; Wilson, J Rowan			Referee: Mr Kirk

11 January 1913 Scottish League	Dunfermline Ath	3–0	Dumbarton	East End Park
	Hall; Drummond

18 January 1913 Scottish League	Leith Athletic	2–2	Dumbarton	Old Logie Green
	Meaney; Kemp		Pender	Attendance: 500; Referee: Mr McBryde

25 January 1913 Scottish League	Dumbarton	1–0	St Johnstone	Boghead Park
	Pender

1 February 1913 Scottish League	Ayr United	1–1	Dumbarton	Somerset Park
	Campbell		Rowan

15 February 1913 Scottish League	Abercorn	1–2	Dumbarton	New Ralston Park
	McAulay		Blyth; Rowan	Attendance: 2,000; Referee: A Edwards

1 March 1913 Scottish League	Dumbarton	2–1	Leith Athletic	Boghead Park
	Wilson, J 40'; Pender 45'		Parkhouse 20'	Attendance: 2,000

15 March 1913 Scottish League	Dumbarton	0–2	St Bernard's	Boghead Park
			Murray

22 March 1913 Scottish League	Arthurlie	0–2	Dumbarton	Dunterlie Park (1906–1919)
			Pender 46'; Rowan	Referee: J Muir

29 March 1913 Scottish League	Dumbarton	0–1	Cowdenbeath	Boghead Park
			Lancaster 68'

5 April 1913 Scottish League	St Johnstone	1–0	Dumbarton	Recreation Grounds (Perth)
	Brown

12 April 1913 Scottish League	Dumbarton	1–0	Ayr United	Boghead Park
	Pender 10'

16 April 1913 Scottish League	Dumbarton	3–0	Abercorn	Boghead Park
	Rowan; Pender

19 April 1913 Scottish League	Cowdenbeath	2–1	Dumbarton	North End Park, Cowdenbeath
	Thomson 45'; Brownlie		Ferguson, J

== Scottish Cup ==
The Scottish Cup campaign saw Dumbarton disposing of First Division opponents before losing to eventual champions Falkirk in the fourth round.

8 February 1913 Cup R2	Dumbarton	2–1	Aberdeen	Boghead Park
	Rowan 3'		Scorgie	Attendance: 10,000; Referee: T Robertson

22 February 1913 Cup R3	Dumbarton	1–0	St Johnstone	Boghead Park
	Rowan			Attendance: 8,000; Referee: T Stark

8 March 1913 Cup R4	Falkirk	1–0	Dumbarton	Brockville Park
	McNaught 80'			Attendance: 10,000; Referee: J Bell

== Scottish Qualifying Cup ==
Dumbarton qualified for the Scottish Cup by reaching the semi-final of the Scottish Qualifying Cup before losing to non-league Nithsdale Wanderers.

7 September 1912 QualifyCup R2	Arthurlie	2–2	Dumbarton	Dunterlie Park (1906–1919)
	McMillan 35'; Stewart 50'		Lawns (OG); Pender	Referee: G McKenzie

14 September 1912 QualifyCup R2r	Dumbarton	0–0	Arthurlie	Boghead Park
				Referee: J Weir

21 September 1912 QualifyCup R2r	Arthurlie	1–2	Dumbarton	Cathkin Park
	McDonald		Rowan	Attendance: 4,000; Referee: J Weir

5 October 1912 QualifyCup R3	Dumbarton Harp	0–0	Dumbarton	Meadow Park, Dumbarton
				Attendance: 10,000; Referee: A Allan

12 October 1912 QualifyCup R3r	Dumbarton	3–1	Dumbarton Harp	Boghead Park
	Potter; McGillivray; Rowan		Hill	Attendance: 7,000; Referee: A Allan

19 October 1912 QualifyCup R4	E Stirling	1–1	Dumbarton	Merchiston Park
	Cooper		Rowan	Referee: J Stark

26 October 1912 QualifyCup R4r	Dumbarton	1–0	E Stirling	Boghead Park
	Rowan			Attendance: 5,000; Referee: J Stark

2 November 1912 QualifyCup SF	Nithsdale Wanderers	4–1	Dumbarton	Castleholm Park, Nithsdale
	Hill; Brown 40'; Morrison 47'		Speedie	Referee: A Jackson

== Friendlies ==
During the season, 3 'friendly' matches were played, winning 1, drawing 1 and losing 1, scoring 4 goals and conceding 4.

15 August 1912 Friendly	Renton	2–2	Dumbarton	Tontine Park
	Goal		Pender; Hunter	Attendance: 2,000

26 April 1913 Friendly	Dumbarton	0–1	Aberdeen	Boghead Park
			Scorgie

30 April 1913 Friendly	Dumbarton	2–1	Vale of Leven	Boghead Park
	Ferguson		Goal

== Player statistics ==
No.	Pos	Nat	Player	Total		Second Division		Scottish Cup		Qualifying Cup	
No.	Pos	Nat	Player	Apps	Goals	Apps	Goals	Apps	Goals	Apps	Goals
	GK	(Scotland) SCO	Douglas Forbes	1	0	1	0	0	0	0	0
	GK	(Scotland) SCO	John B Miller	36	0	25	0	3	0	8	0
	DF	(Scotland) SCO	Thomas Howat	4	0	3	0	0	0	1	0
	DF	(Scotland) SCO	George Hunter	17	0	14	0	3	0	0	0
	DF	(Scotland) SCO	Charles Keir	14	0	11	0	3	0	0	0
	DF	(Scotland) SCO	Willie Lithgow	28	2	18	2	3	0	7	0
	DF	(Scotland) SCO	Robert Muirhead	4	0	1	0	0	0	3	0
	DF	(Scotland) SCO	Walter Wilson	19	0	14	0	0	0	5	0
	MF	(Scotland) SCO	George Bennett	5	0	3	0	0	0	2	0
	MF	(Scotland) SCO	Jack Brown	11	0	11	0	0	0	0	0
	MF	(Scotland) SCO	John Brown	2	0	2	0	0	0	0	0
	MF	(Scotland) SCO	Andrew Potter	26	3	15	2	3	0	8	1
	MF	(Scotland) SCO	John Stewart	19	2	13	2	0	0	6	0
	MF	(Scotland) SCO	John Wilson	11	3	11	3	0	0	0	0
	FW	(Scotland) SCO	Jim Blyth	24	1	21	1	3	0	0	0
	FW	(Scotland) SCO	Andrew Brown	1	0	0	0	1	0	0	0
	FW	(Scotland) SCO	William Duncan	1	0	1	0	0	0	0	0
	FW	(Scotland) SCO	Ferguson	1	0	1	0	0	0	0	0
	FW	(Scotland) SCO	James Ferguson	35	2	24	2	3	0	8	0
	FW	(Scotland) SCO	John Hart	1	0	1	0	0	0	0	0
	FW	(Scotland) SCO	Samuel Hendry	13	0	5	0	0	0	8	0
	FW	(Scotland) SCO	William Main	16	1	8	1	0	0	8	0
	FW	(Scotland) SCO	John MacAuley	2	0	2	0	0	0	0	0
	FW	(Scotland) SCO	Alex McGillivray	11	1	5	0	0	0	6	1
	FW	(Scotland) SCO	Robert Pender	35	12	24	11	3	0	8	1
	FW	(Scotland) SCO	Andy Robertson	3	0	2	0	0	0	1	0
	FW	(Scotland) SCO	Ebenezer Rodger	2	0	2	0	0	0	0	0
	FW	(Scotland) SCO	John Rowan	32	20	22	12	3	3	7	5
	FW	(Scotland) SCO	Finlay Speedie	21	3	16	2	3	0	2	1
	FW	(Scotland) SCO	John Stalker	12	0	10	0	2	0	0	0

=== Transfers ===
==== Players in ====
Player	From	Date
(Scotland) William Main	(England) Preeston NE	3 Jun 1912
(Scotland) John Brown	(Scotland) Vale of Grange	10 Jun 1912
(Scotland) Robert Pender	(Scotland) Kirkintilloch Harp	14 Jun 1912
(Scotland) John MacAulay	(Scotland) Airdrie	15 Jun 1912
(Scotland) Thomas Howat	(Scotland) Airdrie	29 Jun 1912
(Scotland) George Bennett	(Scotland) Parkhead Juniors	10 Jul 1912
(Scotland) George Hunter	(Scotland) Kirkintilloch Rob Roy	14 Sep 1912
(Scotland) John Wilson	(Scotland) Campsie Black Watch	21 Sep 1912
(Scotland) John Stewart	(Scotland) Vale of Leven	24 Sep 1912
(Scotland) Walter Wilson	(England) Aston Villa	24 Sep 1912
(Scotland) Jim Blyth	(Scotland) Pollok	15 Nov 1912
(Scotland) John Stalker	(Scotland) Renton	28 Nov 1912
(Scotland) William Duncan	(Scotland) St Johnstone	10 Dec 1912
(Scotland) John Hart	(Scotland) Campsie Black Watch (trialist)	15 Jan 1913
(Scotland) Andrew Brown	(Scotland) Rangers (loan)	8 Mar 1913
(Scotland) Ebenezer Rodger	(Scotland) Abercorn	20 Mar 1913

==== Players out ====
Player	To	Date
(Scotland) Matthew Haggerty	(Scotland) Third Lanark	29 May 1912
(Scotland) William Brown	(Scotland) Albion Rovers	
(Scotland) George Fyfe	(Scotland) Dundee Hibs	
(Scotland) Johnny Hill	(Scotland) Dumbarton Harp (loan)	

In addition John Brown, George Hunter, Thomas Howat, John MacAulay, William Main, Robert Muirhead, Ebennezer Rodger, John Stalker, John Stewart and John Wilson all played their final 'first XI' games in Dumbarton colours.

== Reserve Team ==
Dumbarton lost in the second round of the Scottish Second XI Cup to Kilmarnock.
