= 1914–15 Dundee Hibernian F.C. season =

Dundee Hibernian
1914–15 season
- Manager: Pat Reilly
- Stadium: Tannadice Park
- Scottish Football League Second Division: 11th W8 D3 L15 F48 A61 P19

The 1914–15 Dundee Hibernian F.C. season was the sixth edition of Dundee Hibernian F.C. annual football played in Scottish Football League Second Division, from 1 July 1914 to 30 June 1915.

== Match results ==
Dundee Hibernian played a total of 26 matches during the 1914–15 season and ranked 11th.

=== Legend ===
Win
Draw
Loss

All results are written with Dundee Hibernian's score first. Own goals in italics

=== Second Division ===
Date	Opponent	Venue	Result	Attendance	Scorers
15 August 1914	Dunfermline Athletic	A	1-3	3,000	
22 August 1914	Arthurlie	H	3-3	2,000	
29 August 1914	St Johnstone	A	1-3	3,000	
12 September 1914	Cowdenbeath	A	0-3	3,000	
19 September 1914	Clydebank	H	1-3	2,000	
26 September 1914	Leith Athletic	A	2-4	2,000	
3 October 1914	Lochgelly United	H	4-3	1,000	
10 October 1914	St Bernard's	H	1-0	500	
17 October 1914	Abercorn	A	2-4	1,000	
24 October 1914	East Stirlingshire	H	1-3	500	
31 October 1914	Albion Rovers	A	0-3	2,000	
7 November 1914	Dunfermline Athletic	H	0-2	400	
14 November 1914	Clydebank	A	3-2	4,000	
21 November 1914	Leith Athletic	H	1-3	500	
28 November 1914	Cowdenbeath	H	2-2	500	
5 December 1914	Johnstone	A	1-2	500	
12 December 1914	Vale of Leven	A	1-1	500	
19 December 1914	Albion Rovers	H	6-1	200	
26 December 1914	Lochgelly United	A	1-2	300	
1 January 1915	Johnstone	H	3-0	500	
2 January 1915	St Johnstone	H	3-1	1,000	
9 January 1915	Arthurlie	A	1-2	1,000	
16 January 1915	Abercorn	H	2-1	1,000	
23 January 1915	St Bernard's	A	1-5	1,000	
6 February 1915	East Stirlingshire	A	3-4	1,000	
13 February 1915	Vale Of Leven	H	4-1	1,500	
