= 1912–13 Dundee Hibernian F.C. season =

Dundee Hibernian
1912–13 season
- Manager: Pat Reilly
- Stadium: Tannadice Park
- Scottish Football League Second Division: 10th W6 D10 L10 F34 A43 P22
- Scottish Cup: Round 2

The 1912–13 Dundee Hibernian F.C. season was the fourth edition of Dundee Hibernian F.C. annual football played in Scottish Football League Second Division, from 1 July 1912 to 30 June 1913.

== Match results ==
Dundee Hibernian played a total of 23 matches during the 1912–13 season and ranked 10th.

=== Legend ===
Win
Draw
Loss

All results are written with Dundee Hibernian's score first. Own goals in italics

=== Second Division ===
Date	Opponent	Venue	Result	Attendance	Scorers
17 August 1912	East Stirlingshire	H	2-3	2,000	
24 August 1912	Leith Athletic	A	0-2	2,000	
31 August 1912	Arthurlie	H	3-1	1,500	
14 September 1912	Vale of Leven	H	1-2	2,000	
28 September 1912	Arthurlie	A	1-4	1,000	
12 October 1912	St Johnstone	A	0-2	1,400	
26 October 1912	Albion Rovers	A	1-5	200	
16 November 1912	Ayr United	A	0-0	1,000	
23 November 1912	Leith Athletic	H	2-1	400	
30 November 1912	Dumbarton	A	0-2	3,000	
7 December 1912	St Johnstone	H	1-1	600	
14 December 1912	St Bernard's	A	0-3	1,000	
21 December 1912	Cowdenbeath	H	0-0	600	
1 January 1913	Dumbarton	H	3-3	500	
2 January 1913	St Bernard's	H	1-1	1,000	
11 January 1913	Johnstone	A	1-4	500	
18 January 1913	Ayr United	H	1-0	350	
25 January 1913	Johnstone	H	7-1	500	
1 February 1913	Vale of Leven	A	2-2	2,000	
15 February 1913	Cowdenbeath	A	1-1	3,000	
22 February 1913	Abercorn	H	3-0	2,000	
1 March 1913	Dunfermline Athletic	A	0-0	1,500	
8 March 1913	East Stirlingshire	A	1-1	500	
15 March 1913	Albion Rovers	H	2-1	600	
22 March 1913	Dunfermline Athletic	H	1-1	1,500	
29 March 1913	Abercorn	A	0-2	2,000	

=== Scottish Cup ===
Date	Rd	Opponent	Venue	Result	Attendance	Scorers
8 February 1913	R2	Queen's Park	A	2-4	10,000	
