= 1909–10 Dumbarton F.C. season =

Dumbarton
1909–1910 season
- Stadium: Boghead Park, Dumbarton
- Scottish League Division Two: 4th
- Scottish Cup: First Round
- Top goalscorer: League: Johnny Hill (13); All: Johnny Hill (16)
Home colours

The 1909–10 season was the 33rd Scottish football season in which Dumbarton competed at national level, entering the Scottish Football League, the Scottish Cup and the Scottish Qualifying Cup. In addition Dumbarton played in the Dumbartonshire Cup.

== Story of the season ==
=== August ===
On 16 August Dumbarton opened the season at Boghead with a friendly against county champions Renton. The team lined up as follows: Forrester (goal); Muirhead and Gordon (full backs); Hynds, Lipton and Kane (half backs) and Ritchie, Brander, Gibson, NcNee and Hill (forwards). Two Brander goals were enough to see the home side began the season with a win.

The opening league tie of the season was played at Boghead on 21 August against Vale of Leven. Hill came in to replace Gibson at centre forward and new signing Spence took over at inside left. The new man scored the opener, but Vale equalised. Dumbarton had the chance to win late on from a penalty and while Ritchie scored, the kick was ordered to be retaken, and he was unable to repeat the task. The game finished 1–1.

The second league fixture was against Raith Rovers a week later at Kirkcaldy. Gordon replaced Kane at left half and O’Neill stepped in at left back, while Hill went to the left wing and Gibson returned at centre forward. Both teams played attacking football, but Raith scored first after a Forrester blunder in goals. Brander equalised before half time but it was the home side who snatched both points with the winning goal in the second half.

=== September ===
On 4 September Dumbarton commenced their Qualifying Cup campaign at Millburn Park against the current holders Vale of Leven. An unchanged side took to the field and began strongly with Hill scoring after 20 minutes. Ritchie scored a second in the second half, and despite the Vale replying with a goal five minutes from time the Sons held on to win 2–1.

It was back to league business a week later as Arthurlie were the visitors to Boghead. For the third week running the same team was fielded and despite having the better of the opening play it was Arthurlie who scored first. Hill however replied within five minutes, and at the interval the scores were level. Spence gave Dumbarton back the lead and then Arthurlie equalised once more. However, the Sons had the last word as Ritchie scored the winner in a 3–2 victory.

On 18 September Johnstone were the opponents at Boghead in the second round of the Qualifying Cup. Again no changes were made to the team. The teams met at the same stage of the competition last season when Dumbarton ran out 4–1 winners and this time they went one better. Hill was first to find the mark and although Johnstone equalised it was one way traffic thereafter with Hill again, Ritchie, Brander and Gibson all scoring in a 5–1 win. Johnstone's task was not helped by one of their backs being hampered by an injury throughout the second half.

During the week Dumbarton signed former internationalist Finlay Speedie (ex Bradford Park Avenue) and goalkeeper Jim McCormick (ex Arthurlie) and both featured in the league match against St Bernards on 25 September at the Gymnasium. Hynds made way for Speedie, while Gordon replaced Muirhead in the back line with Kane taking over at left half. The home side went into the lead within two minutes, but Gibson equalised and that was all the scoring at half time. The Sons continued to press for a winner in the second half but were unable to break the Saints defence and were caught by a breakaway goal and lost by 2–1.

After four games Dumbarton found themselves down in 9th place in the league with just 3 points – Cowdenbeath led with 9 points from 5 played.

=== October ===
On 2 October Dykehead were Dumbarton's opponents in the third round of the Qualifying Cup at Boghead. Muirhead and Hynds returned to the team. New boy Speedie netted his first of the season followed by a second from Gibson. Although the visitors got a goal back before the interval, Brander scored Dumbarton's third just a minute into the second half, and with no further goals the Sons won 3–1.

The following week Dumbarton commenced their county cup programme with a home game against Lennox Amateurs. A couple of squad changes were made with Gordon replacing O’Neil in the back line and McNee coming back in place of Gibson at centre forward. The match was a one-sided affair with Dumbarton handing out a 8–0 thrashing. McNee scored four of the goals, Brander had a hat trick, and Spence got the other.

Dumbarton were drawn away to play Bo’ness in the fourth round of the Qualifying Cup on 16 October. An unchanged side was selected. The game was a closely contested affair with only a single goal separating the teams – Ritchie (under the pseudonym Murray) scoring just before half time. McNee was injured and retired with ten minutes of the match to go and Bo’ness missed a penalty.

On 23 October it was back to league business with a home match against Abercorn. During the week Dumbarton had signed half back Willie Lithgow (ex Glasgow Perthshire) and forward David Anderson (ex Ayr). Lithgow replaced Gordon at left back with Gordon being played at right half and Anderson took the place of the injured McNee. In another tough tussle, the goals came in a five-minute spell just after the interval with Hill opening for the Sons and Abercorn equalising – the match ending in a 1–1 draw.

Ayr were next up on 30 October in the last eight of the Qualifying Cup. A number of changes were made to the team – Hynds and Gibson returned in place of Lithgow and Spence respectively. Returnee Gibson struck the only goal which took Dumbarton through to the semi-final.

As October came to a close Dumbarton found themselves at the foot of the league table with 4 points from five matches played – but with games in hand over their nearest challengers. Raith Rovers led the way with 11 points.

=== November ===
Albion Rovers were the hosts in a league fixture on 6 November. Three changes were made to the team, Lithgow in the defence, Lipton in the half back line and Spence in the attack all returned. The match turned out to be a disappointing one for Dumbarton as the Rovers left wing was in sparking form scoring a hat trick. Brander got a goal back but the game finished in a 3–1 defeat.

On 13 October Dumbarton travelled to line up against Bathgate in the semi-final of the Qualifying Cup. More changes were made by the selection committee with the return of O’Neil, Gordon and Anderson. As expected the match was a close contest but the Sons found the Bathgate defence in their best form. Bathgate scored late in the first half but despite chances at both ends this was to be the only score.

Dumbarton resumed league duty on 20 October with the return fixture against Vale of Leven at Millburn Park. Arthur Urquhart had joined the Sons from Johnstone and he was added to the team on the right wing. In the first half Speedie then Brander had Dumbarton two goals to the good, but Vale rallied and had equalised before half time. Vale continued to pressurise the Sons defence in the second half and took the lead, only for Speedie to equalise from a penalty kick. Vale lost their keeper to injury ten minutes from time but held out for a 3–3 draw.

A week later Dumbarton were at home to play Ayr in the league. Kane replacing Anderson at left half was the only team change. The visitors began brightly but rarely tested McCormick in goals. Play switched to the other end and Lipton scored for Dumbarton but Ayr came back to equalise just before half time. This was the state of affairs with 20 minutes to go but a change in the attack by Dumbarton with Hill switching to centre forward had the desired effect as first Brander and then Hill scored for a 3–1 win.

At the end of the month Dumbarton had lifted themselves off the bottom of the league table with 7 points from 8 games played – Raith maintained the lead with 16 points.

=== December ===
It was another league match on 4 December as Dumbarton travelled to take on Arthurlie. Lithgow replaced Kane and Gibson took over the centre forward's position from Lipton. The home side were quickly into their stride and scored within five minutes, although Anderson then Brander had the Sons in the lead before half time. No further scoring took place, and Dumbarton took the win 2–1 and both points.

On 11 December Albion Rovers came to Boghead to fulfil their return league fixture. Lipton was the only change coming back in place of Hill. Both teams played well on a difficult surface and had chances with no scoring taking place at half time. Rovers lost a player due to injury and played the whole of the second half with 10 men, but Dumbarton failed to find a way through and the game ended in a 0–0 draw.

A week later it was a trip to Falkirk to play East Stirling in the league. O’Neil returned to the defence as did captain Hill to the attack. The game started in favour of the Sons with Gibson scoring twice to give Dumbarton an early 2–0 lead. The Shire came back to score their first goal and shortly thereafter Brander was injured and could take no further part in the game. Just before the interval East Stirling equalised. The ten-man Dumbarton side could not prevent a further shire goal and the game was lost by 3–2.

On Christmas Day Dumbarton were in Fife to play their league fixture against Cowdenbeath. The only change to the team was Lipton returning at centre half. The first goal was a strange one as a Cowdenbeath player was charged and the whistle went. Everyone stopped apart from Hill who ran on and scored easily. Despite protests the score stood. Then before the interval Brander scored. Although the Fifers came back with a goal Speedie wrapped things up from a penalty for a 3–1 win.

The final game of the year was a benefit for long-serving player Bob Gordon against Vale of Leven on 31 December. The game was won by the Vale by 1–0.

As 1909 came to an end Dumbarton had improved another place in the league to 10th with 12 points from 12 games – Raith were still top with 23 points.

=== January ===
On New Year's Day Dumbarton welcomed league leaders Raith Rovers to Boghead. Gordon replaced Lipton in an otherwise unchanged team. The Sons had an easy time of it and were 4–0 up by half time – captain Hill adding another 2 to his season's total. Due to injury Raith played all of the second half with 10 men, but despite continued pressure their defence held firm, and late in the game scored a consolation goal from the penalty spot.

Two days later Dumbarton Harp were the visitors to Boghead in a county cup tie. On the day goals by Hill and Speedie were sufficient for a 2–1 win.

On 5 January Dumbarton played at Renton in a benefit match for one of the Renton players and with both sides playing under strength teams the home side came out on top 4–3.

After their New Year games, Dumbarton's next competitive match was at home on 15 January in the league against Leith Athletic. New signing Alister Gordon (ex Hearts) was introduced on the right wing. Dumbarton started the better and were a goal ahead at the interval. The pressure from the Sons continued until 15 minutes from the end when both Ritchie and Urquhart had to retire injured. Leith took full advantage and scored late on for a 1–1 draw.

A week later Dumbarton faced their toughest challenge for a number of years as Celtic were the visitors in the first round of the Scottish Cup. A team reshuffle was required to accommodate the cup-tied Urquhart with Muirhead returning. The Sons showed up well in the early stages and only a goalkeeping mistake by McCormick had the Celts a goal ahead at the interval. In the second half Dumbarton pushed forward, and new boy Alister Gordon pulled them level. But just as a draw seemed likely Celtic scored a late winner.

Dumbarton's league match against Ayr on 29 January was postponed due to bad weather.

So at the end of January Dumbarton continued to climb the league table – now in 7th place with 15 points from 14 matches played. Raith remained leaders with 23 points.

=== February ===
On 5 February Ayr Parkhouse were at Boghead to fulfil their first league fixture of the season against Dumbarton. Forrester and Urquhart took the places of injured McCormick and Hill. The game turned out to be an easy one for the Sons who were two ahead within 6 minutes. A penalty just before half time was followed by two more in the second half for a comprehensive 5–0 victory.

A week later Dumbarton travelled to Paisley to play Abercorn in the league. Speedie made way for the returning Hill. In the first half the play was fairly even, but the Sons managed to reach the interval with a 2–1 lead. The second half however was all Abercorn as they added four goals for a 5–2 win.

St Bernards were the visitors to Boghead on 19 February for their return league match. After the previous week's showing changes were made with McCormick, Speedie and Kane returning to the team. During the game, a howling gale blew down the pitch. It was not until 15 minutes from the end that Dumbarton, playing with the wind, scored the winner.

On 26 February the return fixture against Ayr Parkhouse was played. Lipton and Ritchie returned to the team. Only three weeks previously the Sons had easily disposed of the Parkies at Boghead, but nevertheless Parkhouse produced the performance of their season so far. Despite going a goal down early on, they played confidently throughout and went on to win 4–2.

February ended with Dumbarton improving to 6th place in the league with 19 points from 18 games played. Still it was Raith at the top with 26 points.

=== March ===
Dumbarton played their third county cup fixture on 5 March at Boghead against cup holders Renton. Bob Gordon and Speedie returned to the team. The match was a tough encounter with the referee having a busy time. Half time arrived goalless but Hill put the Sons ahead after 65 minutes. Shortly thereafter the Sons were awarded a penalty, and so infuriated was the Renton half back that he kicked the ball away. When he refused to retrieve it he was ordered from the field. The penalty kick was scored, and a third late in the game gave Dumbarton a 3–0 win.

On 12 March Dumbarton travelled to Edinburgh to play Leith Athletic in the league. The only change to the team was Urquhart taking Brander's place at inside right. A bright start by the Sons was rewarded by an Alister Gordon goal and this lead was held till just before half time when Leith equalised. The home team opened the second half strongly and went ahead early on. Dumbarton's problems were increased when Ritchie retired from the field injured, and despite chances at both ends the game finished at 2–1 in favour of Leith.

A week later Dumbarton were on their travels again this time to play Ayr in their return league fixture. The selectors refreshed the attack line with Brander, Urquhart and Gibson coming back into the team. The Sons had already beaten Ayr twice during the season, but it was to be third time lucky for Ayr, and with an early goal the home side dominated the play to run out 3–1 winners.

Dumbarton played their first away tie in the county cup competition on 26 March with a game against Vale of Leven. Bob Gordon returned to left back whilst Ritchie came back on the left wing. The game was a close contest from start to finish, but Dumbarton found the Vale keeper unbeatable, and the game ended in a 0–0 draw.

The league at the end of the month showed new leaders with Leith Athletic taking over at the top with 30 points. Dumbarton had slipped to 7th with 19 points from the 20 matches played.

=== April ===
Dumbarton played their penultimate league match at home against Cowdenbeath on 2 April. Lipton and Urquhart were back in the team in place of Lithgow and Alister Gordon. Speedie scored in the first half for the Sons but later had to retire injured. In the second half Dumbarton also lost Ritchie to injury, but the nine men held out for a 1–0 win, with Cowdenbeath missing a late penalty.

After a free weekend, Dumbarton returned to county cup qualification with the return tie against Vale of Leven at Boghead. Alister Gordon took injured Ritchie's place in the team. The Sons led twice in the first half only for the Vale to equalise both times but in the second half a further two goals for Dumbarton settled the issue for a 4–2 win.

The following Tuesday evening Dumbarton visited Meadow Park for the return county cup fixture against Dumbarton Harp. Lithgow and Gibson returned to the team that fought out a goalless draw.

Then two days later the final qualifying tie of the county cup was played against Renton at Tontine Park. Having already booked their place in the final Dumbarton played a couple of trialists and in the end lost their first game of the competition.

On 23 April the final league game of the season was played at Boghead against East Stirling. Ritchie returned from injury and Gibson was also brought back into the team. While the Shire equalised an early Hill goal, from then on it was all Dumbarton as they piled on four more goals before East Stirling scored a late consolation – the game ending in a 5–2 win. The result raised Dumbarton to finish in 4th place with 23 points from their 22 games.

The final game of the season took place on 30 April at Tontine Park. Dumbarton Harp were the opponents in the county cup final. The Harp had been having a great season doing well in both the Qualifying and Consolation Cups while at the same time had won the Union league. Dumbarton fielded a full strength team. No goals were scored by half time, despite numerous chances for both sides. Hill opened the scoring for Dumbarton but the Harp came back and scored twice before the final whistle and so for the fifth successive season Dumbarton were runners up.

=== May ===
Leith Athletic won the Second Division title but decided not to put their names forward for election to the top fight. Dumbarton, along with runners up Raith Rovers, Ayr and Abercorn went into the election together with Morton having finished second to bottom of the First Division. Port Glasgow Athletic had finished at the bottom and resigned from the league with Raith taking their place – full results as follows:

Team	Votes	Result
Morton	16	Re-elected to First Division
Port Glasgow Athletic		Resigned from the League
Raith Rovers	13	Promoted to First Division
Ayr	2	Not promoted to First Division
Abercorn	1	Not promoted to First Division
Dumbarton	0	Not promoted to First Division

== Match results ==
=== Scottish League ===
21 August 1909 Scottish League	Dumbarton	1–1	Vale of Leven	Boghead Park
	Spence		Robertson	Attendance: 3,500; Referee: Mr McInnes

28 August 1909 Scottish League	Raith Rovers	2–1	Dumbarton	Starks Park
	Bain		Brander	Attendance: 3,000; Referee: H Bloomer

11 September 1909 Scottish League	Dumbarton	3–2	Arthurlie	Boghead Park
	Hill; Spence 60'; Ritchie 90'		McKee; Kennedy	Attendance: 3,000; Referee: A Rodger

25 September 1909 Scottish League	St Bernard's	2–1	Dumbarton	Royal Gymnasium Ground
	Graham 2'		Gibson	Attendance: 1,000; Referee: A McGregor

23 October 1909 Scottish League	Dumbarton	1–1	Abercorn	Boghead Park
	Hill 50'		Curran 54'	Attendance: 4,000; Referee: J Kilbride

6 November 1909 Scottish League	Albion Rovers	3–1	Dumbarton	Meadow Park, Coatbridge
	Hemphill		Brander	Referee: Mr Reid

20 November 1909 Scottish League	Vale of Leven	3–3	Dumbarton	Millburn Park
	Howat		Speedie 15' (pen.); Brander 30'	Attendance: 4,000; Referee: J Deans

27 November 1909 Scottish League	Dumbarton	3–1	Ayr	Boghead Park
	Lipton; Brander 70'; Hill		Clark 44'	Attendance: 2,000; Referee: J Mack

4 December 1909 Scottish League	Arthurlie	1–2	Dumbarton	Dunterlie Park (1906–1919)
	Grant		Anderson 5'; Brander	Attendance: 1,500; Referee: J Rorrison

11 December 1909 Scottish League	Dumbarton	0–0	Albion Rovers	Boghead Park
				Attendance: 1,500; Referee: J McKnight

18 December 1909 Scottish League	E Stirling	3–2	Dumbarton	Merchiston Park
	Ivory; Allan		Gibson 5'	Referee: Mr Murray

25 December 1909 Scottish League	Cowdenbeath	1–3	Dumbarton	North End Park, Cowdenbeath
	Dewar		Hill; Brander; Speedie (pen.)	Referee: A Galloway

1 January 1910 Scottish League	Dumbarton	4–1	Raith Rovers	Boghead Park
	Brander 15'; Hill 25', 28'; Speedie 45'		Niblo 90' (pen.)	Referee: J Rorrison

15 January 1910 Scottish League	Dumbarton	1–1	Leith Athletic	Boghead Park
	Urquhart 37'		Young	Referee: J Mason

5 February 1910 Scottish League	Dumbarton	5–0	Ayr Parkhouse	Boghead Park
	Speedie 5' (pen.); Anderson 6'; Brander; Ritchie			Referee: R Lithgow

12 February 1910 Scottish League	Abercorn	5–2	Dumbarton	New Ralston Park
	Curran 20'; Allan; McMillan		Urquhart (pen.); Hill	Referee: J Dickson

19 February 1910 Scottish League	Dumbarton	1–0	St Bernard's	Boghead Park
	Hill 75'			Attendance: 2,000; Referee: J Mack

26 February 1910 Scottish League	Ayr Parkhouse	4–2	Dumbarton	Beresford Park
	Goodwin; Fleming; Cameron		Hill

12 March 1910 Scottish League	Leith Athletic	2–1	Dumbarton	Old Logie Green
	Meaney 44'		Gordon	Referee: A Johnston

19 March 1910 Scottish League	Ayr	3–1	Dumbarton	Somerset Park
	Graham; McLean		Gibson	Referee: Mr Murray

2 April 1910 Scottish League	Dumbarton	1–0	Cowdenbeath	Boghead Park
	Speedie 20'			Attendance: 1,500; Referee: J Murray

23 April 1910 Scottish League	Dumbarton	5–2	E Stirling	Boghead Park
	Brander 10'; Hill 22'; Gordon 40'		Cairney 12'	Referee: Mr Johnstone

=== Scottish Cup ===
22 January 1910 Cup R1	Dumbarton	1–2	Celtic	Boghead Park
	Gordon 65'		Loney 20'; McMenemy 70'	Attendance: 10,000; Referee: J Kelso

=== Scottish Qualifying Cup ===
4 September 1909 QualifyCup R1	Vale of Leven	1–2	Dumbarton	Millburn Park
	Richmond 85'		Hill 20'; Ritchie	Attendance: 4,000; Referee: J Kelso

18 September 1909 QualifyCup R2	Dumbarton	5–1	Johnstone	Boghead Park
	Ritchie; Hill; Brander; Gibson		Urquhart	Attendance: 5,000; Referee: W Guthrie

2 October 1909 QualifyCup R3	Dumbarton	3–1	Dykehead	Boghead Park
	Speedie; Gibson; Brander 46'		Hannah 40'	Attendance: 4,000; Referee: J Stark

16 October 1909 QualifyCup R4	Bo'ness	0–1	Dumbarton	Newtown Park, Bo'ness
			Ritchie 20'	Attendance: 5,000; Referee: W Grieve

30 October 1909 QualifyCup R5	Dumbarton	1–0	Ayr	Boghead Park
	Gibson 25'			Attendance: 5,000; Referee: A Jackson

13 November 1909 QualifyCup SF	Bathgate	1–0	Dumbarton	Mill Park, Bathgate
	Farr 20'			Attendance: 4,000; Referee: Mr Dougary

=== Dumbartonshire Cup ===
9 October 1909 League	Dumbarton	8–0	Lennox	Boghead Park
	McNee; Brander; Spence			Referee: Mr Bloomer

3 January 1910 League	Dumbarton	2–1	Dumbarton Harp	Boghead Park
	Hill; Speedie		Goal	Attendance: 3,000

5 March 1910 League	Dumbarton	3–0	Renton	Boghead Park
	Hill 65'; Brander (pen.); Speedie 90'			Attendance: 2,000

26 March 1910 League	Vale of Leven	0–0	Dumbarton	Millburn Park
				Attendance: 3,000; Referee: D Liddell

16 April 1910 League	Dumbarton	4–2	Vale of Leven	Boghead Park
	Hill 20'; Speedie (pen.); Brander		Caulfield 30'; Robertson 60'	Attendance: 1,000; Referee: Mr Rodgers

19 April 1910 League	Dumbarton Harp	0–0	Dumbarton	Meadow Park, Dumbarton

21 April 1910 League	Renton	1–0	Dumbarton	Boghead Park
	Goal			Attendance: 1,500

30 April 1910 Final	Dumbarton	2–1	Dumbarton Harp	Tontine Park
	Hill		Lucas; Gallagher	Attendance: 5,000; Referee: J Muir

==== League table ====
Pos	Team	Pld	W	D	L	GF	GA	GD	Pts
1	Dumbarton Harp	8	5	2	1	18	7	+11	12
2	Dumbarton	7	4	2	1	17	4	+13	10 (Note: There is no record of Lennox's home matches against Renton and Dumbarton. It is likely as they had no bearing on the finalists that they were never played.)
3	Renton	7	2	2	3	6	10	−4	6
4	Vale of Leven	8	2	2	4	10	14	−4	6
5	Lennox	6	1	0	5	5	21	−16	2

=== Friendlies and other matches ===
16 August 1909 Friendly	Dumbarton	2–0	Renton	Boghead Park
	Brander			Attendance: 1,000

31 December 1909 Friendly	Dumbarton	0–1	Vale of Leven	Boghead Park
			Goal	Attendance: 1,000

5 January 1910 Benefit	Renton	4–3	Dumbarton	Tontine Park
	Goal		Brander; Hill; Gibson

== Player statistics ==
No.	Pos	Nat	Player	Total		Second Division		Scottish Cup		Qualifying Cup	
No.	Pos	Nat	Player	Apps	Goals	Apps	Goals	Apps	Goals	Apps	Goals
	GK	(Scotland) SCO	Daniel Forrester	7	0	5	0	0	0	2	0
	GK	(Scotland) SCO	Joe McCormick	22	0	17	0	1	0	4	0
	DF	(Scotland) SCO	Bob Gordon	22	0	16	0	1	0	5	0
	DF	(Scotland) SCO	Robert Muirhead	27	0	20	0	1	0	6	0
	DF	(Scotland) SCO	John O'Neil	8	0	4	0	0	0	4	0
	MF	(Scotland) SCO	David Hynds	28	0	21	0	1	0	6	0
	MF	(Scotland) SCO	John Lipton	13	1	11	1	0	0	2	0
	MF	(Scotland) SCO	Willie Lithgow	16	0	15	0	1	0	0	0
	FW	(Scotland) SCO	David Anderson	21	2	18	2	1	0	2	0
	FW	(Scotland) SCO	John Brander	28	11	21	9	1	0	6	2
	FW	(Scotland) SCO	William Gibson	16	7	11	4	0	0	5	3
	FW	(Scotland) SCO	Allister Gordon	9	3	8	2	1	1	0	0
	FW	(Scotland) SCO	Johnny Hill	27	16	20	13	1	0	6	3
	FW	(Scotland) SCO	Edward Kane	9	0	6	0	0	0	3	0
	FW	(Scotland) SCO	John McNee	2	0	1	0	0	0	1	0
	FW	(Scotland) SCO	Duncan Ritchie	19	5	12	2	1	0	6	3
	FW	(Scotland) SCO	Finlay Speedie	20	8	15	7	1	0	4	1
	FW	(Scotland) SCO	Alexander Spence	11	2	7	2	0	0	4	0
	FW	(Scotland) SCO	Arthur Urquhart	14	2	14	2	0	0	0	0

=== Transfers ===
==== Players in ====
Player	From	Date
(Scotland) Daniel Forrester	(Scotland) Bellshill Ath	4 Jun 1909
(Scotland) Robert Muirhead	(Scotland) Glasgow Perthshire	22 Jun 1909
(Scotland) Duncan Ritchie	(Scotland) Hibernian (loan)	20 Jul 1909
(Scotland) Alexander Spence	(Scotland) Hearts (loan)	10 Aug 1910
(Scotland) Finlay Speedie	(England) Bradford Park Avenue	15 Sep 1909
(Scotland) Joe McCormick	(Scotland) Arthurlie (loan)	22 Sep 1909
(Scotland) Willie Lithgow	(Scotland) Glasgow Perthshire	14 Oct 1909
(Scotland) David Anderson	(Scotland) Ayr	19 Oct 1909
(Scotland) Arthur Urquhart	(Scotland) Johnstone	16 Nov 1909
(Scotland) David Hamill	(Scotland) Vale of Leven	17 Dec 1909
(Scotland) Allister Gordon	(Scotland) Hearts	11 Jan 1910

==== Players out ====
Player	To	Date
(Scotland) Alexander Fraser	(Scotland) Abercorn	24 Feb 1910
(Scotland) William Monteith	(Scotland) Airdrie	1 Apr 1910
(Scotland) Joe McCormick	(Scotland) Arthurlie	30 Apr 1910
(Scotland) Charles O'Neill	(Scotland) Dumbarton Harp	

In addition Edward Kane, John O'Neill and Daniel Forrester played their final 'first XI' games in Dumbarton colours.
