= 1913–14 Dundee Hibernian F.C. season =

Dundee Hibernian
1913–14 season
- Manager: Pat Reilly
- Stadium: Tannadice Park
- Scottish Football League Second Division: 3rd W11 D4 L7 F36 A31 P26
- Scottish Cup: Round 2

The 1913–14 Dundee Hibernian F.C. season was the fifth edition of Dundee Hibernian F.C. annual football played in Scottish Football League Second Division, from 1 July 1913 to 30 June 1914.

== Match results ==
Dundee Hibernian played a total of 23 matches during the 1913–14 season and ranked 3rd.

=== Legend ===
Win
Draw
Loss

All results are written with Dundee Hibernian's score first. Own goals in italics

=== Second Division ===
Date	Opponent	Venue	Result	Attendance	Scorers
16 August 1913	St Johnstone	A	0-0	2,000	
23 August 1913	Arthurlie	H	1-0	2,000	
30 August 1913	Leith Athletic	A	1-1	5,000	
13 September 1913	Abercorn	A	0-2	500	
20 September 1913	Vale of Leven	H	2-0	2,000	
4 October 1913	Johnstone	H	5-0	1,500	
11 October 1913	Albion Rovers	A	1-2	2,000	
8 November 1913	East Stirlingshire	H	3-1	2,000	
15 November 1913	Dunfermline Athletic	A	0-1	2,000	
22 November 1913	Arthurlie	A	2-3	1,500	
3 January 1914	St Bernard's	H	1-3	15,000	
10 January 1914	Leith Athletic	H	1-1	1,000	
17 January 1914	East Stirlingshire	A	3-1	1,500	
24 January 1914	Abercorn	H	2-1	500	
31 January 1914	Johnstone	A	0-1	300	
14 February 1914	Albion Rovers	H	2-2	1,500	
21 February 1914	Dunfermline Athletic	H	2-1	1,500	
7 March 1914	Cowdenbeath	H	3-0	3,000	
14 March 1914	Cowdenbeath	A	0-7	3,000	
4 April 1914	Vale of Leven	A	2-1	1,000	
11 April 1914	St Bernard's	A	2-1	2,000	
27 April 1914	St Johnstone	H	3-2	1,500	

=== Scottish Cup ===
Date	Rd	Opponent	Venue	Result	Attendance	Scorers
7 February 1914	R2	Airdrieonians	A	0-5	5,000	
