= 1912–13 Ayr United F.C. season =

Ayr United
1912–13 season
- Manager: Selection Committee
- Stadium: Somerset Park
- Scottish Second Division: 1st
- Scottish Cup: Second Round (lost to Airdrieonians)
Home colours

The 1912–13 season was the third season of competitive football by Ayr United.

== Competitions ==
Win Draw Loss

=== Friendly and benefit matches ===
15 August 1912 Friendly	Kilwinning Rangers	1–3	Ayr United	Abbey Park, Kilwinning

21 August 1912 Friendly (Note: Bert Tickle's Testimonial)	Ayr United	1–2	Queens Park	Somerset Park, Ayr

5 April 1913 Friendly	Ayr United	2–1	Dumbarton Harp	Somerset Park, Ayr

7 May 1913 Friendly (Note: Charity match for St Francis Xavier Mission, Waterside.)	Ayr United	0–0	Celtic	Somerset Park, Ayr

Last updated: 2011.
Source: ayr-united.co.uk

=== Scottish Second Division ===
==== Matches ====
17 August 1912 Match 1	Ayr United	0–2	Abercorn	Somerset Park, Ayr

24 August 1912 Match 2	Cowdenbeath	1–1	Ayr United	North End Park, Cowdenbeath

31 August 1912 Match 3	Ayr United	6–0	Vale of Leven	Somerset Park, Ayr

19 October 1912 Match 4	Albion Rovers	0–1	Ayr United	Meadow Park, Coatbridge

2 November 1912 Match 5	Ayr United	3–0	Albion Rovers	Somerset Park, Ayr

9 November 1912 Match 6	Arthurlie	1–2	Ayr United	Dunterlie Park, Barrhead

16 November 1912 Match 7	Ayr United	0–0	Dundee Hibernian	Somerset Park, Ayr

23 November 1912 Match 8	Ayr United	1–0	Cowdenbeath	Somerset Park, Ayr

30 November 1912 Match 9	Dunfermline Athletic	0–0	Ayr United	East End Park, Dunfermline

7 December 1912 Match 10	Ayr United	3–0	Leith Athletic	Somerset Park, Ayr

14 December 1912 Match 11	Abercorn	0–0	Ayr United	New Ralston Park

21 December 1912 Match 12	East Stirlingshire	0–0	Ayr United	Merchiston Park, Bainsford

28 December 1912 Match 13	Ayr United	5–0	Johnstone	Somerset Park, Ayr

1 January 1913 Match 14	Ayr United	3–0	St Bernard's	Somerset Park, Ayr

4 January 1913 Match 15	St Johnstone	3–3	Ayr United	Recreation Grounds, Perth

11 January 1913 Match 16	Ayr United	3–0	East Stirlingshire	Somerset Park, Ayr

18 January 1913 Match 17	Dundee Hibernian	1–0	Ayr United	Tannadice Park, Dundee

25 January 1913 Match 18	Ayr United	1–1	Arthurlie	Somerset Park, Ayr

1 February 1913 Match 19	Ayr United	1–1	Dumbarton	Somerset Park, Ayr

22 February 1913 Match 20	Leith Athletic	1–4	Ayr United	Old Logie Green, Leith

1 March 1913 Match 21	Vale of Leven	1–3	Ayr United	Millburn Park, Alexandria

8 March 1913 Match 22	Ayr United	3–1	St Johnstone	Somerset Park, Ayr

15 March 1913 Match 23	Johnstone	2–1	Ayr United	Newfield Park, Johnstone

22 March 1913 Match 24	St Bernard's	3–0	Ayr United	Royal Gymnasium Ground, Edinburgh

29 March 1913 Match 25	Ayr United	1–0	Dunfermline Athletic	Somerset Park, Ayr

5 April 1913 Match 26	Dumbarton	1–0	Ayr United	Boghead Park, Dumbarton

Last updated: 2011.
Source: ayr-united.co.uk

=== Scottish Qualifying Cup ===
7 September 1912 1st Round	Galston	2–2	Ayr United	Portland Park, Galston

14 September 1912 1st Round (replay)	Ayr United	1–1	Galston	Somerset Park, Ayr

21 September 1912 1st Round (2nd replay)	Ayr United	0–0 (a.e.t.)	Galston	Somerset Park, Ayr

25 September 1912 1st Round (3rd replay)	Ayr United	3–0	Galston	Somerset Park, Ayr

28 September 1912 2nd Round	Hurlford United	3–3	Ayr United

5 October 1912 2nd Round (replay)	Ayr United	4–2	Hurlford United	Somerset Park, Ayr

12 October 1912 3rd Round	Ayr United	3–0	Girvan Athletic	Somerset Park, Ayr

26 October 1912 4th Round	Abercorn	2–1	Ayr United	New Ralston Park

Last updated: 2011.
Source: ayr-united.co.uk

=== Scottish Cup ===
8 February 1913 2nd Round	Ayr United	0–2	Airdrieonians	Somerset Park, Ayr

Last updated: 2011.
Source: ayr-united.co.uk

=== Ayrshire Cup ===
15 February 1913 2nd Round	Ayr United	5–2	Annbank United	Somerset Park, Ayr

19 April 1913 Semi Final	Beith	1–1	Ayr United

26 April 1913 Semi Final (Replay)	Ayr United	3–0	Beith	Somerset Park, Ayr

Last updated: 2011.
Source: ayr-united.co.uk

=== Ayr Charity Cup ===
3 May 1913 Semi Final	Ayr United	5–0	Annbank United	Somerset Park, Ayr

10 May 1913 Final	Ayr United	3–0	Hurlford United	Somerset Park, Ayr

Last updated: 2011.
Source: ayr-united.co.uk

== Statistics ==
=== League table ===
Pos	Team	Pld	W	D	L	GF	GA	GD	Pts	Promotion or relegation
1	Ayr United (C, P)	26	13	8	5	45	19	+26	34	Promoted to the 1913–14 Scottish Division One
2	Dunfermline Athletic	26	13	7	6	45	27	+18	33	
3	East Stirlingshire	26	12	8	6	43	27	+16	32	
4	Abercorn	26	12	7	7	33	31	+2	31	
5	Cowdenbeath	26	12	6	8	36	27	+9	30	

Source: statto.com
Rules for classification: Teams finish equal if level on points. Points system: 2 points for a win, 1 point for a draw, 0 points for a loss
(C) Champions; (P) Promoted

==== Results by round ====
Round	1	2	3	4	5	6	7	8	9	10	11	12	13	14	15	16	17	18	19	20	21	22	23	24	25	26
Ground	H	A	H	A	H	A	H	H	A	H	A	A	H	H	A	H	A	H	H	A	A	H	A	A	H	A
Result	L	D	W	W	W	W	D	W	D	W	D	D	W	W	D	W	L	D	D	W	W	W	L	L	W	L
Position	10	10	5	8	7	5	5	3	3	1	1	1	1	1	1	1	1	1	1	1	1	1	1	1	1	1

Source: Statto.com
A = Away; H = Home; W = Win; D = Draw; L = Loss
