= 1910–11 Dumbarton F.C. season =

Dumbarton
1910–1911 season
- Stadium: Boghead Park, Dumbarton
- Scottish League Division Two: 1st
- Top goalscorer: League: John Rowan (13); All: John Rowan (15)
Home colours

The 1910–11 season was the 34th Scottish football season in which Dumbarton competed at national level, entering the Scottish Football League, the Scottish Qualifying Cup and the Scottish Consolation Cup.

== Story of the Season ==
=== August ===
Dumbarton began the season at Boghead with a benefit match for long serving player John Brander against Abercorn on 15 August. Hill and triallist McCallum scored the goals in a 2–0 win.

Two days later a pre-season friendly was played at Boghead against county champions Dumbarton Harp. Hill, Brander returnee Greer and an own goal were enough for a comfortable 4–1 win.

On 20 August Dumbarton opened the competitive season at Millburn Park with a league game against Vale of Leven. The team lined up as follows: McCormick (goal); Muirhead and Gordon (full backs); Hynds, Crawford and Hendry (half backs) and Watson, Rowan, Sneddon, Greer and Hill (forwards). The game opened brightly with Vale opening the scoring within the first ten minutes. The Sons were quick to respond as Rowan equalised five minutes later. No further scoring took place and the game ended in a1-1 draw..

During the week that followed Dumbarton played a further two ‘trial’ matches against Shettleston on 23 August and Vale of Leven on 25 August to try out new players. The match at Shettleston finished 2–2 with Watson scoring both goals and at Millburn Park the Vale took the honours 1–0. On 27 August the first league fixture against last season's relegated side Port Glasgow Athletic was played. William Clark (ex Lennox) was tried at right half in place of Hynds who had picked up an injury against Vale of Leven. The game was a poor one from the Sons perspective as a goal in each half handed Port Glasgow a 2–0 win, although the loss of Brander to injury was a factor.

=== September ===
The first round of the Qualifying Cup draw saw Dumbarton come up against Dykehead and this was played out on 3 September. Hynds returned, and Speedie came in at left back. In addition new signing Andrew Potter (ex Ayr) came in on the left wing. The game had plenty of excitement but no goals so went to a replay. This match marked Bob Gordon's 100th appearance for the club in national competitions

The replay was played a week later at Boghead. Another new face was introduced at inside left – Herbert MacPherson (ex Liverpool). Dumbarton opened strongly and Watson opened the scoring which is how things stood at half time. Things got a little rough in the second half with Muirhead and a Dykehead player being ordered from the field but no further scoring took place.

On 17 September Dumbarton played their away league fixture against early league leaders St Bernards. Yet another new signing took the field being former Rangers back Andrew Cochrane taking suspended Muirhead's place with Clark returning in place of Hynds. The Saints were first to the attack and scored early on, only for Crawford to equalise shortly thereafter. St Bernards went ahead again before half time and though the Sons played the entire second half with 10 men – losing Brander to injury – they had most of the game but were unable to score again. The match finished in a 2–1 defeat.

Dumbarton's first home league fixture was played against Vale of Leven on 24 September. Hynds returned to the half back line and Greer took the place of injured Brander. A tough match was expected and no quarter was given by either side. Speedie and a Vale player were ordered from the field for rough play in the first half and shortly thereafter the Vale right back was carried off with a broken collar bone. So the 10 men of Dumbarton resumed against the nine of the Vale, but it was not until the last minutes of the game that Hill struck for the winner and the Sons first league win of the season.

=== October ===
On 1 October the second round of the Qualifying Cup was played with an away tie against Galston. Suspended Speedie was replaced by Bob Gordon, Lithgow took Hynds place in the half back line while Duncan Ritchie, who had been signed from Hibernian, was preferred to Greer in the attack. The Ayrshire side quickly took the lead but goals from Hill and then Ritchie gave the Sons the lead before half time. The home side had the better of the play in the second half and equalised before full time for a 2–2 draw.

The following Saturday the replay was played at Boghead with an unchanged side taking the field. Cochrane missed an early penalty kick and Galston took full advantage by taking the lead before half time. Watson got the equaliser for Dumbarton with 15 minutes left but no further scoring took place with the tie still undecided after the 1–1 draw.

Neutral Ibrox Park was the venue for the second replay on 15 October. Greer came in at inside left to replace MacPherson. Both teams had a number of goal chances throughout the 90 minutes but neither side could find an opening, although Galston missed a penalty. Extra time was played and again in the first 15 minutes there was no breakthrough. However Galston scored early in the second half of extra time and this was followed by another. In the closing minutes McCormick was sent off with Galston scoring a third from the resultant penalty.

A week later it was back to league business with an away tie against Albion Rovers. Muirhead returned from his suspension and Brander came back from injury. In addition ex Rangers John Dickie was tried out on the right wing. On the day Rovers outclassed the Sons with two goals in the first half and another in the second for a comfortable 3–0 win. However were it not for McCormick in goal the defeat may have been worse.

On 29 October Dumbarton played their home league fixture against Port Glasgow Athletic. Winless for the past four weeks changes were made to the squad. Wallace got his first game in goal to replace suspended McCormick, Hendry returned to the half back line while Speedie took Hill's place up front. The Sons started brightly and Rowan (under the pseudonym ‘Robertson’) scored before Port Glasgow equalised before half time. This time however Dumbarton were not to be denied and Brander scored the winner just before the final whistle. This match marked John Brander's 100th appearance for the club in national competitions.

October ended with Dumbarton holding 8th place in the league after 6 games, with Albion Rovers on top with 12 points having played 8.

=== November ===
The newly formed Ayr United (Ayr and Ayr Parkhouse having amalgamated) were the visitors to Boghead on 5 November in the league. Clark was the only change to the team in place of Lithgow. The Sons started off the better and two goals from Rowan had hem comfortably ahead at the interval. Brander scored a third early in the second half but then Dumbarton slackened off. Ayr came back with two goals but Dumbarton held on for a 3–2 win.

The following week Dumbarton travelled to Arthurlie to play the away league fixture. One change was made with Crawford returning in place of Clark. The home side were first to score after 15 minutes but Ritchie got the equaliser within a minute. Just before half time Rowan pounced to score and in a scrappy second half he managed another for a 3–1 win.

On 19 November Dumbarton played their first ever match against Dundee Hibernian at Tannadice. Watson and MacPherson came into the attack in place of Dickie and Brander. The Sons pushed forward immediately and goals from Rowan and Ritchie had them two ahead by half time. Another from MacPherson wrapped up a fine 3–0 win.

The county cup competition began for Dumbarton on 26 November with a home fixture against town rivals and cup holders Dumbarton Harp. The Harp began well and scored after 20 minutes but Potter responded for the Sons before the interval, Fifteen minutes into the second half saw the Harp retake the lead and despite a number of near misses by Dumbarton the game finished 2–1 for the visitors.

The three successive victories in the league during the month had raised Dumbarton to 6th with 11 points from 9 games. Albion Rovers still led with 16 points from 12 matches.

=== December ===
Dumbarton played their away league fixture against Abercorn on 3 December, The only change to the team saw Brander return in place of MacPherson. The Sons started strongly and had a number of chances before, against the run of play, Abercorn scored, a shot coming off Muirhead into his own goal. After a Rowan effort was ruled offside, Abercorn scored again and despite further pressure it was the home team that scored a third. Just before half time Speedie got the goal that rewarded the Dumbarton play. Brander notched a second after 65 minutes but all further efforts were dealt with by the home defence – resulting in a 3–2 defeat for the Sons.

League leaders Albion Rovers were next up a week later at Boghead. Ritchie switched wings to make way for Hill with Watson dropping out. The game was a fast and exciting one with the Rovers showing up better in the first half though no goals were scored at half time. The second half had just started when Rowan scored the Sons opener and this spurred on the home team, it being no surprise that Rowan scored again to wrap up a 2–0 win.

The opponents from two weeks ago, Abercorn, came to Boghead to play off the return league fixture on 17 December. MacPherson returned to the team and replaced Potter in the half back line. For a time it looked as if the Sons would have the same luck as in the previous match as in the first half they had most of the play but Abercorn scored the only goal. The second half however was a different story – with Brander levelling within five minutes of the restart. Further goals from Brander, Rowan and Hill put the result beyond doubt and a fine 4–1 win was recorded.

On Christmas Eve, Dumbarton entertained Renton for the second qualifying match in the county championship. Muirhead and Rowan were rested with Cochrane and Potter returning to the team. The game opened well for the Sons with MacPherson scoring within two minutes. Renton equalised soon thereafter but Speedie scored to retake the lead with MacPherson scoring again before half time. Another goal for Dumbarton settled the tie with the home team winning 4–1.

On the last day of 1910 Dumbarton played their home league fixture against Arthurlie. Muirhead took Cochrane's place in the defence. Hill was first to score after 20 minutes but then Ritchie had to leave the field injured. The 10 man Sons however continued to pressurise the Arthurlie defence and Brander scored a second before half time. Arthurlie scored early in the second half but the Sosn replied through goals by MacPherson and Hill again for a third successive 4–1 win.

So at the end of 1910 Dumbarton had improved to 3rd place in the league with 17 points from 13 games played. Albion Rovers still headed the table with 21 points from their 16 matches.

=== January ===
The first game of 1911 on 7 January saw Dumbarton play their fifth successive home match this time in the league against Leith Athletic. New signing former internationalist Alex Menzies (ex Port Glasgow Athletic) took injured Ritchie's place. The Sons played well from the start but it was not until early in the second half that Hill opened the scoring from a penalty. Brander scored a second and Dumbarton gained another two league points in a comfortable 2–0 win.

Dumbarton opened their Consolation Cup campaign on 14 January with a first round home tie against Wishaw Thistle. Rowan returned at centre forward in an otherwise unchanged team. Again it was a confident display by the Sons but the front line unfortunately were unable to convert the numerous chances that were presented to them. Ultimately MacPherson scored but Wishaw were able to equalise quite soon afterwards. Hill missed a penalty and in the end Dumbarton had to settle for a 1–1 draw and a replay. This match marked Johnny Hill's 100th appearance for the club in national competitions

And so a week later Dumbarton travelled to Wishaw with an unchanged side. Due to a late train Speedie arrived late and the Sons played with 10 men for the first ten minutes. Notwithstanding, Dumbarton were the better team but it was Wishaw that led at half time with a goal scored against the run of play. The second half began with a lot of rough play, so much so that the referee called both teams together for a stern lecture. The score was unchanged until the 80th minute when MacPherson then Speedie scored. Wishaw quickly equalised but with 2 minutes remaining MacPherson scored what proved to be the winner.

On 28 January Dumbarton were drawn in the second round of the Consolation Cup to play Dykehead at Boghead. Ritchie replaced Rowan in the attack. Dykehead started well and one of their early attacks resulted in Speedie heading past his own keeper. Hill however equalised before half time. In the second half the Sons played the better but it was not until the 83rd minute that Speedie made up for his earlier blunder with a goal at the right end. MacPherson and Hill again completed the scoring for a 4–1 win.

The league at the end of January had Dumbarton well placed in 3rd with 19 points from 14 games, while Albion Rovers were still ahead with 21 points from 17 matches played.

=== February ===
It was an away league fixture against Cowdenbeath that was played on 4 February. One change was made to the team with Menzies replacing Brander. And it was Menzies who opened the scoring after 5 minutes. Shortly afterwards the Cowdenbeath captain was ordered off but despite the handicap the Fifers equalised before half time. Speedie gave the Sons back the lead early in the second half but again 10 man Cowdenbeath replied with their second. However Dumbarton had the last word as MacPherson scored the winner in a 3–2 victory. The result took Dumbarton to the top of the league for the first time this season.

On 11 February St Bernards were the visitors to Boghead on league business. An unchanged side took to the field. As it was the new league leaders had no difficulty in accounting for the Saints. Certainly St Bernards were a man short for the first 15 minutes but even with a full team they were no match for the Sons who piled on four goals before half time. The second half started with a Saints goal but this rallied the Sons to score a further four goals to win in the end 8–2 – Menzies scoring four himself. This match marked Bob Gordon's 118th competitive game for the club – overtaking Alex Miller's record set in 1897.

East Stirling were the visitors to Boghead on 18 February for the home league fixture but the pitch was declared unplayable. Nonetheless, the teams resolved to play a friendly fixture which Dumbarton duly won by 4–0.

The following week Dumbarton headed to Edinburgh to play Leith Athletic in their away league fixture. Rowan was the only change replacing Menzies. Dumbarton continued with their fine vein of form and were two ahead at the interval. MacPherson scored a third before Leith scored a consolation goal at the end for a 3–1 win.

So February ended with Dumbarton at the top of the league with 25 points from 17 games – two ahead of Albion Rovers and with two games in hand.

=== March ===
On 4 March Dumbarton faced stiff opposition in their third round tie of the Consolation Cup at Boghead against Abercorn. The team was unchanged and started out strongly although at half time in the game they had no goals to show for their efforts. The second half had however barely started when Speedie put Dumbarton ahead and with a second from Rowan the Sons moved into the next round with a 2–0 win.

Dumbarton were favoured with another home tie in the fourth round of the Consolation Cup against Ayrshire side Hurlford on 11 March. Brander replacing Rowan was the only change made to the team. The Sons were in sparkling form and were four in front by the interval. Another two in the second half counted towards an easy 6–1 win. The only black spot being Ritchie and the Hurlford left back being sent off in the dying minutes of the game.

The following week Dumbarton faced a long journey to play Forres Mechanics in the semi-final of the Consolation Cup. Lithgow was included in the team in place of Bob Gordon. The Sons had offered Forres a financial incentive to have the game played at Boghead but they needn’t have worried as Potter and MacPherson had the visitors two in front by half time. A further three goals countered by a home penalty gave Dumbarton a fine 5–1 win and a second Consolation Cup final appearance.

On 25 March Dumbarton played Cowdenbeath in their home league fixture knowing that a win would almost certainly guarantee them the Second Division title. An unchanged side took to the field and within five minutes of the start Ritchie put the Sons into the lead. Hill scored a second after 57 minutes but these goals were enough for a 2–0 win and the two vital points.

So with 4 games to play Dumbarton led with 27 points. Albion Rovers were two behind with only one game to play and a vastly inferior goal average.

=== April ===
On 1 April Dumbarton hoped to confirm their league championship with an away match against Ayr United. Gordon replaced Lithgow in the defence while Brander came in for Speedie in the attack. The game was a disappointment as Dumbarton fell to their first league defeat since 3 December and also a surprise in the size of the defeat – by 5–1. This would be Bob Gordon's final game for the club – during his six seasons with the club he set a new record of 122 appearances in all national competitive matches.

A week later Dumbarton travelled to Falkirk to make amends against East Stirling. Lithgow was back in at left back as was Speedie at inside left. Still requiring a point to make the league title official the Sons began positively but could find no way past the Shire defence. The home team took the lead midway through the first half and scored again early in the second for a 2–0 win.

At a meeting of the Dumbartonshire Association on 14 April, Dumbarton intimated that due to their league and cup commitments they could take no further part in this season's county cup competition.

Dumbarton's penultimate league fixture took place on 15 April against Dundee Hibs at Boghead. The only change was Rowan playing in place of Brander. And so it was at the third time of asking the Sons managed to gain the all-important points to confirm the championship. MacPherson and Rowan scored in the first half and Ritchie scored another in the second for a comfortable 3–1 win.

Two days later Dumbarton played a benefit for long-serving full back Bob Muirhead against Glasgow Perthshire, the junior side where he began his career. The game finished in a 1–1 draw with Muirhead scoring the Sons goal.

Ibrox Park was the venue of the Consolation Cup final on 22 April. No changes were made to the team that lifted the Second Division title. The Sons began in spectacular style and the only surprise at half time was that they only led by a single Rowan goal. As poor as St Johnstone were in the first half, they came out in the second a different team. The Dumbarton goal came under severe pressure and ultimately the Perthshire team equalised. Before the Sons had time to reform they were behind and despite a number of raids on the St Johnstone goal it was to be runners up spot once again.

The final game of the season took place at Boghead on 29 April with the final league game against East Stirling. With the league won, a number of changes were made to the team with Cochrane and new face George Thomas taking over at full backs, with Lithgow and Menzies coming into the half back line and attack respectively. The game was to have taken place in February but because of an unplayable pitch a friendly was played which Dumbarton won 4–0. As it was history repeated itself as far as the result was concerned as doubles in each half gave the Sons a 4–0 victory. The win ensured that Dumbarton maintained a 100% home record during the league campaign.

=== May ===
Dumbarton were the only applicants from the Second Division for promotion. Nevertheless, it was the bottom two First Division clubs – Motherwell and Queen's Park – that maintained their' top flight' status in the end-of-season elections. In addition for the second year in succession a vote to apply automatic promotion and relegation failed.

== Match Results ==
=== Scottish League ===
20 August 1910 Scottish League	Vale of Leven	1–1	Dumbarton	Millburn Park
	Wilkinson 10'		Rowan 13'	Attendance: 4,000; Referee: T Faichney

27 August 1910 Scottish League	Port Glasgow Athletic	2–0	Dumbarton	Clune Park
	Sneddon; Findlay, R			Attendance: 3,000; Referee: R Lithgow

17 September 1910 Scottish League	St Bernard's	2–1	Dumbarton	Royal Gymnasium Ground
	Wilkie; Ferguson		Crawford	Attendance: 1,500; Referee: W McInnes

24 September 1910 Scottish League	Dumbarton	1–0	Vale of Leven	Boghead Park
	Hill 85'			Attendance: 4,000; Referee: J Winters

22 October 1910 Scottish League	Albion Rovers	3–0	Dumbarton	Meadow Park, Coatbridge
	Chalmers; Duncan 45'; Hemphill			Referee: J Murray

29 October 1910 Scottish League	Dumbarton	2–1	Port Glasgow Athletic	Boghead Park
	Rowan; Brander		Sneddon	Attendance: 2,000; Referee: Mr Preston

5 November 1910 Scottish League	Dumbarton	3–2	Ayr United	Boghead Park
	Rowan; Brander 55'		Campbell 75'; Tickle	Attendance: 2,500; Referee: J Dudgeon

12 November 1910 Scottish League	Arthurlie	1–3	Dumbarton	Dunterlie Park (1906–1919)
	McConnell 15'		Ritchie 16'; Rowan	Referee: D Liddell

19 November 1910 Scottish League	Dundee Hibs	0–3	Dumbarton	Tannadice Park
			Rowan; MacPherson; Ritchie	Attendance: 1,000

3 December 1910 Scottish League	Abercorn	3–2	Dumbarton	New Ralston Park
	Muirhead (o.g.); Horn; McMillan		Speedie; Brander 65'	Referee: S Feggans

10 December 1910 Scottish League	Dumbarton	2–0	Albion Rovers	Boghead Park
	Rowan 46'			Referee: J Dudgeon

17 December 1910 Scottish League	Dumbarton	4–1	Abercorn	Boghead Park
	Brander 50', 75'; Rowan; Hill		Horn 10'	Attendance: 2,000

31 December 1910 Scottish League	Dumbarton	4–1	Arthurlie	Boghead Park
	Hill 20', 90'; Brander; MacPherson		Stevenson 52'	Attendance: 3,000

7 January 1911 Scottish League	Dumbarton	2–0	Leith Athletic	Boghead Park
	Speedie (pen.); Brander			Attendance: 1,500

4 February 1911 Scottish League	Cowdenbeath	2–3	Dumbarton	North End Park, Cowdenbeath
	Curle		Menzies; Speedie; Brander 65'	Referee: G Moon

11 February 1911 Scottish League	Dumbarton	8–2	St Bernard's	Boghead Park
	Speedie; Menzies; Potter; Ritchie		Morton 55'	Attendance: 3,000; Referee: D Liddell

25 February 1911 Scottish League	Leith Athletic	1–3	Dumbarton	Old Logie Green
	O'Brien		MacPherson 65'	Attendance: 3,000; Referee: Mr Penman

25 February 1911 Scottish League	Dumbarton	2–0	Cowdenbeath	Boghead Park
	Ritchie 5'; Hill 57'			Attendance: 2,500; Referee: A Johnstone

1 April 1911 Scottish League	Ayr United	5–1	Dumbarton	Somerset Park
	Goodwin		Hill

8 April 1911 Scottish League	E Stirling	2–0	Dumbarton	Merchiston Park
	Thomson; Gray			Attendance: 2,000

15 April 1911 Scottish League	Dumbarton	3–1	Dundee Hibs	Boghead Park
	MacPherson 30'; Rowan 31'; Ritchie		Dunnison	Attendance: 3,000; Referee: H Bloomer

29 April 1911 Scottish League	Dumbarton	4–0	E Stirling	Boghead Park
	Rowan 15'; MacPherson; Hill			Attendance: 2,000

=== Scottish Qualifying Cup ===
3 September 1910 QualifyCup R2	Dykehead	0–0	Dumbarton	Parkside, Shotts
				Referee: D Liddell

10 September 1910 QualifyCup R2r	Dumbarton	1–0	Dykehead	Boghead Park
	Watson 35'			Attendance: 3,000; Referee: D Liddell

1 October 1910 QualifyCup R3	Galston	2–2	Dumbarton	Riverside Park, Galston
	Barrowman; Fullarton		Hill; Ritchie	Attendance: 3,000; Referee: T Robertson

8 October 1910 QualifyCup R3r	Dumbarton	1–1	Galston	Boghead Park
	Watson 75'		Morrison 30'	Attendance: 4,000; Referee: R Stark

15 October 1910 QualifyCup R3r	Dumbarton	0–3 (a.e.t.)	Galston	Ibrox Park
			Brown; Morrison; Richmond (pen.)	Attendance: 3,000; Referee: R Stark

=== Scottish Consolation Cup ===
14 January 1911 ConsolCup R1	Wishaw Thistle	1–1	Dumbarton	Recreation Park, Wishaw
	Plunkett		MacPherson	Referee: A Allan

21 January 1911 ConsolCup R1r	Dumbarton	3–2	Wishaw Thistle	Boghead Park
	MacPherson; Speedie		Laughlan; Plunkett	Attendance: 1,200; Referee: A Allan

28 January 1911 ConsolCup R2	Dumbarton	4–1	Dykehead	Boghead Park
	Hill 87'; Speedie 83'; MacPherson 88'		Speedie (o.g.)	Attendance: 3,000

4 March 1911 ConsolCup R3	Dumbarton	2–0	Abercorn	Boghead Park
	Speedie 46'; Rowan 85'			Attendance: 4,000; Referee: G McKenzie

11 March 1911 ConsolCup R4	Dumbarton	6–1	Hurlford	Boghead Park
	Brander 15'; Speedie 25', 40'; Hill 45', 60'; MacPherson		Goal	Attendance: 3,000

18 March 1911 ConsolCup SF	Forres Mechanics	1–5	Dumbarton	Mosset Park, Forres
	Murray (pen.)		Potter; MacPherson; Brander; Ritchie; Crawford

22 March 1911 ConsolCup Final	Dumbarton	1–2	St Johnstone	Ibrox Park
	Rowan 30'		McKay 60'; Cunningham 65'	Attendance: 6,000; Referee: R Murray

=== Dumbartonshire Cup ===
26 November 1910 League	Dumbarton	1–2	Dumbarton Harp	Boghead Park
	Potter 30'		McLeish 20'; O'Neill 60'	Attendance: 3,000

24 December 1910 League	Dumbarton	4–1	Renton	Boghead Park
	MacPherson 2'; Speedie		Carroll 7'	Attendance: 2,000

- – Due to league and national cup commitments, it was decided that the club would be unable to fulfil their obligations in the Dumbartonshire Cup competition, and Dumbarton withdrew having played two games.

=== Friendlies/Other Matches ===
15 August 1910 Benefit	Dumbarton	2–0	Abercorn	Boghead Park
	Hill; McCallum			Attendance: 1,500

17 August 1910 Friendly	Dumbarton	4–1	Dumbarton Harp	Boghead Park
	Brander; Greer; Hill (o.g.)		Goal	Attendance: 2,000

23 August 1910 Friendly	Shettleston	2–2	Dumbarton	Shettleston
	Watson		Goal

25 August 1910 Friendly	Vale of Leven	1–0	Dumbarton	Millburn Park
	Goal

18 February 1911 Friendly	Dumbarton	4–0	E Stirling	Boghead Park
	Ritchie 12', 15'; Menzies 22'; Crawford

15 April 1911 Friendly	Dumbarton	1–1	Glasgow Perthshire	Boghead Park
	Muirhead		Goal

== Player statistics ==
No.	Pos	Nat	Player	Total		Second Division		Qualifying Cup		Consolation Cup	
No.	Pos	Nat	Player	Apps	Goals	Apps	Goals	Apps	Goals	Apps	Goals
	GK	(Scotland) SCO	Joe McCormick	10	0	5	0	5	0	0	0
	GK	(Scotland) SCO	Hugh Wallace	24	0	17	0	0	0	7	0
	DF	(Scotland) SCO	Andrew Cochrane	14	0	7	0	4	0	3	0
	DF	(Scotland) SCO	Bob Gordon	25	0	16	0	4	0	5	0
	DF	(Scotland) SCO	Willie Lithgow	11	0	6	0	3	0	2	0
	DF	(Scotland) SCO	Robert Muirhead	29	0	20	0	2	0	7	0
	DF	(Scotland) SCO	George Thomas	1	0	1	0	0	0	0	0
	MF	(Scotland) SCO	William Clark	3	0	3	0	0	0	0	0
	MF	(Scotland) SCO	John Crawford	31	2	19	1	5	0	7	1
	MF	(Scotland) SCO	Samuel Hendry	26	0	18	0	1	0	7	0
	MF	(Scotland) SCO	David Hynds	4	0	2	0	2	0	0	0
	MF	(Scotland) SCO	Andrew Potter	30	2	18	1	5	0	7	1
	FW	(Scotland) SCO	John Brander	18	9	14	7	0	0	4	2
	FW	(Scotland) SCO	John Dickie	4	0	4	0	0	0	0	0
	FW	(Scotland) SCO	William Greer	4	0	3	0	1	0	0	0
	FW	(Scotland) SCO	Johnny Hill	28	12	17	7	4	1	7	4
	FW	(Scotland) SCO	Herbert MacPherson	24	14	14	8	3	0	7	6
	FW	(Scotland) SCO	Alex Menzies	4	5	4	5	0	0	0	0
	FW	(Scotland) SCO	Duncan Ritchie	24	7	16	5	3	1	5	1
	FW	(Scotland) SCO	John Rowan	25	15	15	13	5	0	5	2
	FW	(Scotland) SCO	George Sneddon	4	0	2	0	2	0	0	0
	FW	(Scotland) SCO	Finlay Speedie	27	10	18	5	2	0	7	5
	FW	(Scotland) SCO	John Watson	11	2	6	0	5	2	0	0

=== Transfers ===
==== Players in ====
Player	From	Date
(Scotland) John Watson	(Scotland) Albion Rovers	19 May 1910
(Scotland) George Sneddon	(Scotland) Dykehead	24 May 1910
(Scotland) John Rowan	(Scotland) Glasgow Perthshire	26 May 1910
(Scotland) William Clark	(Scotland) Lennox Amateurs	28 May 1910
(Scotland) John Crawford	(Scotland) Renton	1 Jun 1910
(Scotland) William Greer	(England) QPR	14 Jul 1910
(Scotland) Joe McCormick	(Scotland) Arthurlie (loan)	17 Aug 1910
(Scotland) Samuel Hendry	(Scotland) Renfrew Victoria	17 Aug 1910
(Scotland) Hugh Wallace	(Scotland) Glasgow Perthshire	17 Aug 1910
(Scotland) Herbert MacPherson	(England) Liverpool	1 Sep 1910
(Scotland) Andrew Potter	(Scotland) Ayr Parkhouse	1 Sep 1910
(Scotland) Andrew Cochrane	(Scotland) Rangers	15 Sep 1910
(Scotland) Duncan Ritchie	(Scotland) Hibernian (loan)	7 Oct 1910
(Scotland) John Dickie	(Scotland) Rangers	20 Oct 1910
(Scotland) Alex Menzies	(Scotland) Port Glasgow Ath	14 Dec 1910
(Scotland) George Thomas	(Scotland)	26 Jan 1911

==== Players out ====
Player	To	Date
(Scotland) David Anderson	(Scotland) Hibernian	12 Aug 1910
(Scotland) John Lipton	(Scotland) Dumbarton Harp	12 Aug 1910
(Scotland) Arthur Urquhart	(Scotland) Beith	14 Oct 1910
(Scotland) Allister Gordon	(Scotland) Abercorn	6 Jan 1911
(Scotland) William Clark	(Scotland) Vale of Leven	10 May 1911
(Scotland) William Gibson	(Scotland) Renton	
(Scotland) William Greer	(Scotland) Dumbarton Harp	
(Scotland) George Sneddon	(Scotland) Dykehead	
(Scotland) Bob Gordon	(Scotland) Freed	
(Scotland) John Watson	(Scotland) Freed	

In addition John Crawford and George Thomas played their final 'first XI' games in Dumbarton colours.

== Reserve Team ==
Dumbarton lost in the second round of the Scottish Second XI Cup to Rangers.
