= 1910–11 Dundee Hibernian F.C. season =

Dundee Hibernian
1910–11 season
- Manager: Pat Reilly
- Stadium: Tannadice Park
- Scottish Football League Second Division: 8th W7 D5 L10 F29 A36 P19

The 1910–11 Dundee Hibernian F.C. season was the 2nd edition of Dundee Hibernian annual football play and their first season in the Scottish Football League Second Division. It covers the period from 1 July 1910 to 30 June 1911.

== Match results ==
Dundee Hibernian played a total of 22 matches during the 1910–11 season and ranked 8th.

=== Legend ===
Win
Draw
Loss

All results are written with Dundee Hibernian's score first. Own goals in italics

=== Second Division ===
Date	Opponent	Venue	Result	Attendance	Scorers
20 August 1910	Leith Athletic	H	2-3	2,000	
10 September 1910	St Bernard's	A	3-4	2,000	
17 September 1910	Abercorn	H	4-1	1,500	
24 September 1910	Albion Rovers	A	0-0	1,500	
1 October 1910	Cowdenbeath	H	2-0	2,000	
8 October 1910	Vale of Leven	H	1-1	1,500	
22 October 1910	Port Glasgow Athletic	A	2-1	700	
29 October 1910	Arthurlie	H	2-0	1,000	
5 November 1910	Abercorn	A	2-1	1,500	
12 November 1910	Ayr United	A	0-3	1,000	
19 November 1910	Dumbarton	H	0-3	1,000	
26 November 1910	Vale of Leven	A	0-2	1,500	
3 December 1910	Ayr United	H	1-1	1,000	
10 December 1910	Leith Athletic	A	1-1	1,500	
17 December 1910	Arthurlie	A	1-3	1,500	
24 December 1910	St Bernard's	H	1-2	1,500	
31 December 1910	Cowdenbeath	A	0-3	2,000	
2 January 1911	East Stirlingshire	A	1-3	2,500	
7 January 1911	Albion Rovers	H	1-0	1,000	
18 March 1911	Port Glasgow Athletic	H	4-1	1,000	
1 April 1911	East Stirlingshire	H	0-0	1,000	
15 April 1911	Dumbarton	A	1-3	1,000	
