= 1911–12 Dundee Hibernian F.C. season =

Dundee Hibernian
1911–12 season
- Manager: Pat Reilly
- Stadium: Tannadice Park
- Scottish Football League Second Division: 10th W5 D5 L12 F21 A41 P15

The 1911–12 Dundee Hibernian F.C. season was the third edition of Dundee Hibernian annual football play in the Scottish Football League Second Division, from 1 July 1911 to 30 June 1912.

== Match results ==
Dundee Hibernian played a total of 22 matches during the 1911–12 season.

=== Legend ===
Win
Draw
Loss

All results are written with Dundee Hibernian's score first. Own goals in italics

=== Second Division ===
Date	Opponent	Venue	Result	Attendance	Scorers
19 August 1911	East Stirlingshire	A	1-3	3,000	
26 August 1911	Leith Athletic	H	1-0	4,000	
16 September 1911	Albion Rovers	A	0-1	2,000	
23 September 1911	St Johnstone	A	0-1	4,000	
30 September 1911	Arthurlie	A	1-1	1,000	
7 October 1911	Albion Rovers	H	0-1	2,000	
14 October 1911	St Bernard's	H	2-2	2,000	
21 October 1911	Ayr United	A	0-6	3,000	
28 October 1911	Abercorn	H	1-1	2,000	
4 November 1911	St Bernard's	A	1-7	1,500	
11 November 1911	St Johnstone	H	1-0	2,000	
18 November 1911	Cowdenbeath	A	0-2	3,000	
25 November 1911	Arthurilie	H	0-0	2,000	
2 December 1911	Vale of Leven	A	0-2	500	
9 December 1911	Leith Athletic	A	0-3	3,500	
16 December 1911	Ayr United	H	2-2	2,000	
30 December 1911	Vale of Leven	H	0-1	1,500	
2 January 1912	Dumbarton	A	0-1	3,000	
6 January 1912	East Stirlingshire	H	1-0	1,000	
10 February 1912	Abercorn	A	1-3	2,000	
17 February 1912	Dumbarton	H	4-2	2,500	
8 April 1912	Cowdenbeath	H	5-2	1,000	
