= 1923–24 Dundee United F.C. season =

Dundee United
1923–24 season
- Manager: Jimmy Brownlie
- Stadium: Tannadice Park
- Scottish Football League Second Division: 9th W12 D15 L11 F41 A41 P39
- Scottish Cup: Round 1

The 1923–24 Dundee United F.C. season was the 15th edition of Dundee United F.C. annual football play Scottish Football League Second Division from 1 July 1923 to 30 June 1924.

== Match results ==
Dundee United played a total of 39 matches during the 1923–24 season, ranked 9th.

=== Legend ===
Win
Draw
Loss

All results are written with Dundee United's score first. Own goals in italics

=== Second Division ===
Date	Opponent	Venue	Result	Attendance	Scorers
18 August 1923	Cowdenbeath	H	0-0	10,000	
25 August 1923	Alloa Athletic	A	1-0	3,000	
1 September 1923	Albion Rovers	H	2-0	8,000	
8 September 1923	Stenhousemuir	A	0-3	2,000	
15 September 1923	Johnstone	H	1-1	8,000	
22 September 1923	Arbroath	A	1-2	4,000	
29 September 1923	Vale of Leven	H	3-1	5,000	
6 October 1923	Dunfermline Athletic	A	0-1	3,500	
13 October 1923	East Fife	H	0-0	5,000	
20 October 1923	King's Park	A	3-2	5,000	
27 October 1923	Dumbarton	A	0-3	2,000	
3 November 1923	St Bernard's	H	3-2	3,000	
10 November 1923	Forfar Athletic	A	0-0	2,500	
17 November 1923	Lochgelly United	H	1-0	4,000	
24 November 1923	Broxburn United	A	2-1	1,500	
1 December 1923	Armadale	A	1-1	1,500	
8 December 1923	Bathgate	A	0-3	2,000	
15 December 1923	Bo'ness	H	0-0	3,000	
22 December 1923	Johnstone	A	1-2	1,000	
31 December 1923	Cowdenbeath	A	4-4	5,000	
2 January 1924	Alloa Athletic	H	0-1	4,000	
5 January 1924	Lochgelly United	A	0-0	1,000	
12 January 1924	Armadale	H	4-0	2,000	
19 January 1924	East Fife	A	0-0	3,000	
2 February 1924	St Johnstone	H	1-1	12,682	
6 February 1924	King's Park	H	0-0	2,000	
16 February 1924	Dumbarton	H	0-1	1,500	
23 February 1924	Arbroath	H	2-0	4,500	
1 March 1924	Vale of Leven	A	1-1	1,000	
5 March 1924	St Bernard's	A	0-0	1,500	
8 March 1924	St Johnstone	A	1-4	8,000	
15 March 1924	Bo'ness	A	1-1	1,500	
22 March 1924	Broxburn United	H	0-2	3,000	
5 April 1924	Albion Rovers	A	2-1	1,500	
12 April 1924	Bathgate	H	2-0	400	
16 April 1924	Stenhousemuir	H	0-1	400	
19 April 1924	Dunfermline Athletic	H	2-2	1,000	
26 April 1924	Forfar Athletic	H	2-0	1,000	

=== Scottish Cup ===
Date	Rd	Opponent	Venue	Result	Attendance	Scorers
26 January 1924	R1	Hibernian	A	0-1	16,000	
