= John Young (footballer, born 1888) =

Scottish footballer

Personal information
- Full name: John Young
- Date of birth: 1888
- Place of birth: Glasgow, Scotland
- Date of death: 25 September 1915 (aged 28)
- Place of death: near Hohenzollern Redoubt, France
- Position: Inside right

Senior career*
Years	Team	Apps	(Gls)
–1908	Strathclyde		
1908–1913	Celtic	4	(0)
1908–1909	→ Morton (loan)	16	(3)
1910	→ Ayr (loan)	4	(0)
1911–1912	→ Dundee Hibernian (loan)	3	(0)
1912–1913	→ Dundee Hibernian (loan)	0	(0)
- * Club domestic league appearances and goals

John Young (1888 – 25 September 1915) was a Scottish professional footballer who played as an inside right in the Scottish League for Morton, Celtic, Ayr and Dundee Hibernian.

== Personal life ==
Young worked as a foundry labourer and was married with one child. During the early months of the First World War, he enlisted as a private in the Queen's Own Cameron Highlanders and arrived on the Western Front, in trenches at Locon, France, on 30 June 1915.

== Death ==
Young was killed on 25 September 1915, during a frontal attack on Little Willie Trench, north of the Hohenzollern Redoubt, during the Battle of Loos. He is commemorated on the Loos Memorial.

== Career statistics ==
Appearances and goals by club, season and competition
Club	Season	League			Scottish Cup		Total	
Club	Season	Division	Apps	Goals	Apps	Goals	Apps	Goals
Celtic	1908–09	Scottish First Division	1	0	—		1	0
Celtic	1909–10	Scottish First Division	2	0	—		2	0
Celtic	1910–11	Scottish First Division	1	0	0	0	1	0
Celtic	Total		4	0	0	0	4	0
Morton (loan)	1908–09	Scottish First Division	16	3	1	0	17	3
Ayr (loan)	1909–10	Scottish Second Division	4	0	2	1	6	1
Dundee Hibernian (loan)	1911–12	Scottish Second Division	3	0	1	0	4	0
Career total			27	3	4	1	31	4

== See also ==
- List of people who disappeared
