= Dan Munro =

Scottish footballer

Personal information
- Full name: Daniel Munro
- Date of birth: 2 March 1887
- Place of birth: Peterhead, Scotland
- Date of death: Unknown
- Position: Winger

Youth career
- 1906–1907: Forres Mechanics

Senior career*
| Years | Team | Apps | (Gls) |
| 1907–1910 | Celtic | 30 | (5) |
| 1910–1914 | Bradford Park Avenue | 85 | (3) |
| 1914–1915 | Port Vale | 11 | (2) |
| 1918–1919 | Clydebank | 1 | (0) |
| Total | | 96 | (5) |
- * Club domestic league appearances and goals

Daniel Munro (2 March 1887 – ?) was a Scottish footballer who played as a winger for Celtic, Bradford Park Avenue, Port Vale, and Clydebank.

== Career ==
Munro began his career at Forres Mechanics before he joined Celtic in 1907. He signed with Bradford Park Avenue in October 1910, and became a first-team regular for the Second Division side. He joined Port Vale in the summer of 1914. He made his debut at outside-right in a 3–1 win over Everton Reserves in a Central League match at the Athletic Ground on 1 September 1914. He was released at the end of the 1914–15 season as the club went into abeyance due to World War I. He later played for Clydebank.

== Career statistics ==
Appearances and goals by club, season and competition
| Club | Season | League | | | National cup (Note: Includes Scottish Cup, FA Cup) | | Total | |
| Club | Season | Division | Apps | Goals | Apps | Goals | Apps | Goals |
|---|---|---|---|---|---|---|---|---|
| Celtic | 1908–09 | Scottish Division One | 18 | 5 | 4 | 0 | 23 | 5 |
| Celtic | 1909–10 | Scottish Division One | 7 | 0 | 2 | 0 | 9 | 0 |
| Celtic | 1910–11 | Scottish Division One | 5 | 0 | 0 | 0 | 5 | 0 |
| Celtic | Total | | 30 | 5 | 6 | 0 | 36 | 5 |
| Bradford Park Avenue | 1910–11 | Second Division | 27 | 1 | 2 | 0 | 29 | 1 |
| Bradford Park Avenue | 1911–12 | Second Division | 21 | 1 | 3 | 0 | 24 | 1 |
| Bradford Park Avenue | 1912–13 | Second Division | 31 | 1 | 5 | 0 | 36 | 1 |
| Bradford Park Avenue | 1913–14 | Second Division | 6 | 0 | 0 | 0 | 6 | 0 |
| Bradford Park Avenue | Total | | 85 | 3 | 10 | 0 | 95 | 3 |
| Port Vale | 1914–15 | Central League | 11 | 2 | 1 | 1 | 12 | 3 |
| Career total | | | 96 | 5 | 11 | 1 | 107 | 6 |
