= Meadow Park =

Meadow Park may refer to:

- Meadow Park (Borehamwood), home ground of Boreham Wood F.C. and Arsenal youth teams
- Meadow Park, Coatbridge, former home ground of Albion Rovers
- Meadow Park, Dumbarton, home ground of Dumbarton Harp
- Meadow Park, Gloucester, former home ground of Gloucester City A.F.C.
