= 1920–21 Dundee Hibernian F.C. season =

Dundee Hibernian
1920–21 season
- Manager: Pat Reilly
- Stadium: Tannadice Park
- Scottish Cup: Lost in Scottish Qualifying Cup

The 1920–21 Dundee Hibernian F.C. season was the 12th edition of Dundee Hibs annual football play in the Central League. There had been only one division in the Scottish Football League since the suspension of the Second Division during the Great War. Due to the failure of a proposal to restore the Second Division, which Dundee Hibs had expected inclusion, many of its prospective teams joined the Central as a rival competition.

Dundee Hibs failed to qualify for the Scottish Cup, losing in the Qualifying Cup to local rivals Arbroath after two replays.

== Match results ==
Dundee Hibernian played a total of matches during the 1920–21 season.

=== Legend ===
Win
Draw
Loss

All results are written with Dundee Hibernian's score first. Own goals in italics

=== Scottish Qualifying Cup ===
Date	Rd	Opponent	Venue	Result	Attendance	Scorers
4 September 1920	R1	Arbroath	A	1-1	3,000	
11 September 1920	R1 R	Arbroath	H	1-1	8,000	
18 September 1920	R1 2R	Arbroath	A	0-3	5,000	
