= Robert Pender (footballer) =

Scottish footballer

Personal information
- Full name: Robert Pender
- Date of birth: 5 November 1891
- Place of birth: Coatbridge, Scotland
- Height: 5 ft 8 in (1.73 m)

Youth career
- Kirkintilloch Harp

Senior career*
Years	Team	Apps	(Gls)
1912–1914	Dumbarton	30	(13)
1914	St Mirren	1	(0)
1914–1916	Johnstone	14	(7)
1916–1919	Raith Rovers	13	(0)
1919–1920	Middlesbrough		
1924–1927	St Johnstone	36	(0)
- * Club domestic league appearances and goals

Robert Pender (born 5 November 1891) was a Scottish footballer who played for Dumbarton, St Mirren, Johnstone, Raith Rovers, Middlesbrough and St Johnstone.
