= Johnstone Harp F.C. =

Former association football club in Scotland

Johnstone Harp
- Full name: Johnstone Harp Football Club
- Nickname: the Harp
- Founded: 1886
- Dissolved: 1890
- Ground: Castle Park
- Match Secretary: Henry M'Glynn
| 1886–88 colours | 1888–90 colours |

Johnstone Harp Football Club was a football club based in Johnstone, Renfrewshire, in Scotland.

== History ==
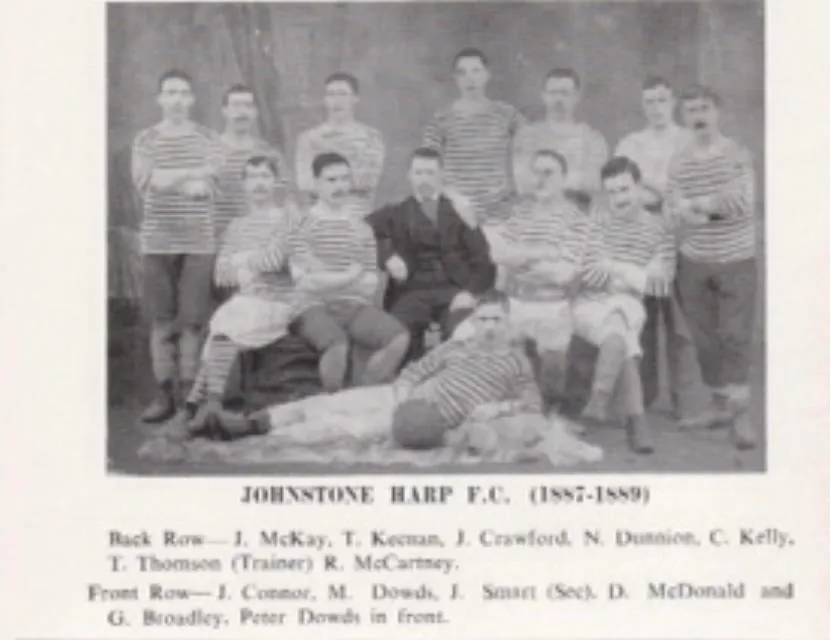
Johnstone Harp F.C., 1889

During the 1884–85 season, the two senior clubs in Johnstone, Johnstone F.C. and Johnstone Rovers, agreed to merge. Rovers had a number of players with Irish roots, and, given the merged club had taken on Johnstone's colours and ground, there may have been some dissatisfaction, as for the 1886–87 the Irish community in Johnstone formed a new club, the Harp. Whereas the merged Johnstone club only had 82 to 86 members in 1886, the Harp started out with 100.

Despite this size advantage, the development of football had already passed the town by, with the merger of clubs happening too late for sustained success, and the split between Johnstone and Harp further diluting the available resources. On top of this, the rise of Celtic F.C. in nearby Glasgow further attracted attention away from the side.

As a consequence, the club was entirely unsuccessful. It entered the Scottish Cup and Renfrewshire Cup three times, and never won through to the second round in either. In the first round of the 1886–87 Scottish Cup, the club's first reported match, the Harp took the lead at Port Glasgow Athletic, but then conceded 10 goals without further reply. The club lost in the first round of the Renfrewshire Cup in the same season, by the same score, but this time at home to the mediocre Renfrew side.

The 1887–88 season was nearly as bad; once more the club was eliminated from the national competition by a 9-goal margin, this time by Abercorn; the Harp kept the score down to 2 in the first half, but only drew two saves out of the Abercorn goalkeeper Clark. In the Renfrewshire the club lost 5–0 at St Mirren.

The club did pick up towards the end of the season, which saw the club win seven matches in a row, including a 10–1 win over the small Howwood club in the Johnstone & District Cup. Indeed, the Harp reached the final of the competition for the only time, but was out-passed by Lochwinnoch in the final and lost 1–0.

The Harp's final season in competitive football, 1888–89, saw it lose much more narrowly in the Scottish Cup, 5–4 at home to Woodvale, but it suffered another humiliating defeat in the first round of the Renfrewshire, 8–0 at the 1st Renfrewshire Rifle Volunteers of Greenock.

The final record for the club is in relation to its tie against Thornliebank in the 1889–90 Scottish Cup. The Harp scratched from the tie, expecting to play the match as a friendly, but, as Thornliebank did not turn up, the Harp protested to the Scottish Football Association, and got an order against Thornliebank for it to pay the 10s 10½d which the Harp had spent on bills and posting. There is however no record of the club playing any senior club again and in August 1890 the club was struck from the SFA membership roll.

== Colours ==
The club originally played in green jerseys and white knickers. In 1888 it changed to black and white jerseys with white knickers.

== Ground ==
The club started playing at Castle Park, 200 yards from Elderslie railway station, and the former ground of Glenpatrick. In 1888 it moved to Newfield Park.

== Notable players ==
- Peter Dowds, future Celtic forward, played for the Harp in 1888
- Willie Dunning, future Celtic goalkeeper, played for the Harp in 1888 (NB listed as N. Dunnion in the picture above)
