= John L. Ritchie =

Scottish footballer (1876–1943)

John Ritchie
Personal information
- Full name: John Lindsay Ritchie
- Date of birth: 1875
- Place of birth: Cardross, Scotland
- Date of death: 1943 (aged 67–68)
- Place of death: Old Kilpatrick, Scotland
- Height: 6 ft 0 in (1.83 m)
- Position: Right back

Youth career
- Tontine Juveniles

Senior career*
Years	Team	Apps	(Gls)
1894–1896	Renton	36	(0)
1896–1898	Queen's Park	0	(0)
1898–1899	Hibernian	3	(0)
1899–1900	St Mirren	1	(0)
–	Renton		
Total		40	(0)

International career
1897	Scotland	1	(1)
- * Club domestic league appearances and goals

John Lindsay Ritchie (1875 – 1943) was a Scottish footballer who played as a full back for Renton, Queen's Park, Hibernian and St Mirren.

He started his senior career with Renton, playing in the 1895 Scottish Cup Final which ended in a 2–1 defeat to St Bernard's; he joined Queen's Park (who were not members of the Scottish Football League at the time) in 1896, and won the Glasgow Football League in 1896–97. After short spells with Hibs and St Mirren he returned to Renton (by now no longer SFL members), and was in the side that performed strongly in the 1906–07 Scottish Cup – alongside his younger cousin Duncan Ritchie whose career was just beginning – beating St Bernard's then Dundee before going out to Queen's Park in the quarter-finals.

Ritchie played once for the Scotland national football team, in a British Home Championship match against Wales in March 1897. Ritchie captained the Scotland team and scored a goal from a penalty kick in the match, which ended in a 2–2 draw. At the end of that year he represented the Glasgow FA in their annual challenge match against Sheffield.

== See also ==
- List of Scotland national football team captains
- List of Scottish football families
