= 1912–13 Scottish Football League =

Football competition

Statistics of the Scottish Football League in season 1912–13.

== Scottish League Division One ==
Pos	Team	Pld	W	D	L	GF	GA	GD	Pts
1	Rangers (C)	34	24	5	5	76	41	+35	53
2	Celtic	34	22	5	7	53	28	+25	49
=3	Heart of Midlothian	34	17	7	10	71	43	+28	41
=3	Airdrieonians	34	15	11	8	64	46	+18	41
5	Falkirk	34	14	12	8	56	38	+18	40
=6	Hibernian	34	16	5	13	63	54	+9	37
=6	Motherwell	34	12	13	9	47	39	+8	37
=6	Aberdeen	34	14	9	11	47	40	+7	37
9	Clyde	34	13	9	12	41	44	−3	35
10	Hamilton Academical	34	12	8	14	44	47	−3	32
11	Kilmarnock	34	10	11	13	37	54	−17	31
12	St Mirren	34	10	10	14	50	60	−10	30
=13	Dundee	34	8	13	13	33	46	−13	29
=13	Morton	34	11	7	16	50	59	−9	29
15	Third Lanark	34	8	12	14	31	41	−10	28
16	Raith Rovers	34	8	10	16	46	60	−14	26
17	Partick Thistle	34	10	4	20	40	55	−15	24
18	Queen's Park	34	5	3	26	34	88	−54	13

Source: "1912-1913 Division 1 - SPFL Archive". SPFL.
(C) Champions

== Scottish League Division Two ==
Pos	Team	Pld	W	D	L	GF	GA	GD	Pts	Promotion or relegation
1	Ayr United (C, P)	26	13	8	5	45	19	+26	34	Promoted to the 1913–14 Scottish Division One
2	Dunfermline Athletic	26	13	7	6	45	27	+18	33	
3	East Stirlingshire	26	12	8	6	43	27	+16	32	
4	Abercorn	26	12	7	7	33	31	+2	31	
5	Cowdenbeath	26	12	6	8	36	27	+9	30	
6	Dumbarton (P)	26	12	5	9	38	30	+8	29	Promoted to the 1913–14 Scottish Division One
7	St Bernard's	26	12	3	11	36	34	+2	27	
8	Johnstone	26	9	6	11	31	43	−12	24	
9	Albion Rovers	26	10	3	13	38	40	−2	23	
10	Dundee Hibernian	26	6	10	10	34	43	−9	22	
11	St Johnstone	26	7	7	12	29	38	−9	21	
11	Vale of Leven	26	8	5	13	28	44	−16	21	
13	Arthurlie	26	7	5	14	37	49	−12	19	
14	Leith Athletic	26	5	8	13	26	47	−21	18	

Source: statto.com
Rules for classification: Teams finish equal if level on points. Points system: 2 points for a win, 1 point for a draw, 0 points for a loss
(C) Champions; (P) Promoted

== See also ==
- 1912–13 in Scottish football
