= Jim Blyth (footballer, born 1890) =

Scottish footballer

James Cameron Blyth
Personal information
- Full name: James Cameron Blyth
- Date of birth: 27 November 1890
- Place of birth: Govanhill, Scotland

Youth career
- Pollok

Senior career*
Years	Team	Apps	(Gls)
1912–1914	Dumbarton	36	(3)
- * Club domestic league appearances and goals

James Cameron Blyth (born 27 November 1890) was a Scottish footballer who played for Dumbarton.
