= Scottish Football Union =

The Scottish Football Union was a football league competition that existed from 1906 till the outbreak of the First World War. It was formed after the collapse of the Scottish Football Alliance.

Initial membership of the Union was: Alloa Athletic, Bathgate, Bo'ness, Broxburn, Heart of Midlothian 'A', Kilmarnock 'A', King's Park, Rangers 'A', Renton, Royal Albert, St Mirren 'A' and Stenhousemuir. Renton withdrew from the league with seven games to play and Rangers 'A' were declared inaugural champions after Bathgate indicated their unwillingness to participate in a play-off game with them, despite finishing level on points. The following season, Stenhousemuir withdrew after six games played and were replaced by Wishaw Thistle.

The Union was initially viewed as the strongest "non-league" competition in Scotland for a while, but its status began to diminish when clubs departed to play in other leagues, such as in 1912 when Dumbarton Harp left to join the Scottish Reserve Football League. The last full season of the Scottish Union was 1913–14 as the following season's competition was left uncompleted.

== List of champions ==
- 1906–07: Rangers 'A'
- 1907–08: Bathgate
- 1908–09: Falkirk 'A'
- 1909–10: Dumbarton Harp
- 1910–11: Peebles Rovers
- 1911–12: Galston
- 1912–13: Dykehead
- 1913–14: Queen's Park Victoria XI
- 1914–15: Incomplete

== See also ==
- Defunct leagues in Scottish football
