= 1909–10 Scottish Football League =

Scottish football season

Statistics of the Scottish Football League in season 1909–10.

== Scottish League Division One ==
Pos	Team	Pld	W	D	L	GF	GA	GD	Pts	Relegation
1	Celtic (C)	34	24	6	4	63	22	+41	54	Champions
2	Falkirk	34	22	8	4	71	28	+43	52	
3	Rangers	34	20	6	8	70	35	+35	46	
4	Aberdeen	34	16	8	10	44	29	+15	40	
5	Clyde	34	14	9	11	47	40	+7	37	
6	Dundee	34	14	8	12	52	44	+8	36	
7	Third Lanark	34	13	8	13	62	44	+18	34	
8	Hibernian	34	14	6	14	33	40	−7	34	
9	Airdrieonians	34	12	9	13	46	57	−11	33	
10	Motherwell	34	12	8	14	59	60	−1	32	
11	Kilmarnock	34	12	8	14	53	59	−6	32	
12	Heart of Midlothian	34	12	7	15	59	50	+9	31	
13	St Mirren	34	13	5	16	48	58	−10	31	
14	Queen's Park	34	12	6	16	54	74	−20	30	
15	Hamilton Academical	34	11	6	17	50	67	−17	28	
16	Partick Thistle	34	8	10	16	45	59	−14	26	
17	Morton	34	11	3	20	38	60	−22	25	
18	Port Glasgow Athletic (R)	34	3	5	26	25	93	−68	11	Relegated to the 1910–11 Scottish Division Two

(C) Champions; (R) Relegated

== Scottish League Division Two ==
Pos	Team	Pld	W	D	L	GF	GA	GD	Pts	Promotion or relegation
1	Leith Athletic (C)	22	13	7	2	44	19	+25	33 (Note: Leith Athletic and Raith Rovers finished level on points but did not contest a play-off match for the championship so were declared joint winners.)	
1	Raith Rovers (C, P)	22	14	5	3	36	21	+15	33	Promoted to the 1910–11 Scottish Division One
3	St Bernard's	22	12	3	7	43	31	+12	27	
4	Dumbarton	22	9	5	8	44	38	+6	23	
5	Abercorn	22	7	8	7	38	40	−2	22	
6	Ayr	22	9	3	10	37	40	−3	21	
6	Vale of Leven	22	8	5	9	36	38	−2	21	
8	East Stirlingshire	22	9	2	11	38	43	−5	20	
9	Albion Rovers	22	7	5	10	34	39	−5	19	
10	Arthurlie	22	6	5	11	34	47	−13	17	
10	Cowdenbeath	22	7	3	12	22	34	−12	17	
12	Ayr Parkhouse	22	4	3	15	27	43	−16	11	

Source: statto.com
Rules for classification: Teams finish equal if level on points. Points system: 2 points for a win, 1 point for a draw, 0 points for a loss
(C) Champions; (P) Promoted

== See also ==
- 1909–10 in Scottish football
