= 1910–11 Scottish Football League =

Scottish football season

Statistics of the Scottish Football League in season 1910–11.

== Scottish League Division One ==
Pos	Team	Pld	W	D	L	GF	GA	GD	Pts
1	Rangers (C)	34	23	6	5	90	34	+56	52
2	Aberdeen	34	19	10	5	53	28	+25	48
3	Falkirk	34	17	10	7	65	42	+23	44
4	Partick Thistle	34	17	8	9	50	41	+9	42
5	Celtic	34	15	11	8	48	18	+30	41
6	Dundee	34	18	5	11	54	42	+12	41
7	Third Lanark	34	16	7	11	59	53	+6	39
8	Clyde	34	14	11	9	45	36	+9	39
9	Hibernian	34	15	6	13	44	48	−4	36
10	Kilmarnock	34	12	10	12	42	45	−3	34
11	Airdrieonians	34	12	9	13	49	53	−4	33
12	St Mirren	34	12	7	15	46	57	−11	31
13	Morton	34	9	11	14	49	51	−2	29
14	Heart of Midlothian	34	8	8	18	42	59	−17	24
15	Raith Rovers	34	7	10	17	36	55	−19	24
16	Hamilton Academical	34	8	5	21	31	60	−29	21
17	Motherwell	34	8	4	22	37	66	−29	20
18	Queen's Park	34	5	4	25	28	80	−52	14

Rules for classification: Teams finish equal if level on points. Points system: 2 points for a win, 1 point for a draw, 0 points for a loss
(C) Champions

== Scottish League Division Two ==
Pos	Team	Pld	W	D	L	GF	GA	GD	Pts	Qualification
1	Dumbarton (C)	22	15	1	6	52	30	+22	31	
2	Ayr United	22	12	3	7	54	36	+18	27	
3	Albion Rovers	22	10	5	7	26	21	+5	25	
4	Leith Athletic	22	9	6	7	42	43	−1	24	
5	Cowdenbeath	22	9	5	8	31	27	+4	23	
6	St Bernard's	22	10	2	10	36	41	−5	22	
7	East Stirlingshire	22	7	6	9	28	34	−6	20	
8	Abercorn	22	9	1	12	39	50	−11	19	
8	Arthurlie	22	7	5	10	26	33	−7	19	
8	Dundee Hibernian	22	7	5	10	29	36	−7	19	
8	Port Glasgow Athletic (R)	22	8	3	11	27	32	−5	19	Did not apply for re-election (Note: Port Glasgow Athletic did not apply for re-election to compete for the next season and were replaced by St Johnstone.)
12	Vale of Leven	22	4	8	10	21	28	−7	16	

Source: statto.com
Rules for classification: Teams finish equal if level on points. Points system: 2 points for a win, 1 point for a draw, 0 points for a loss
(C) Champions; (R) Relegated

== See also ==
- 1910–11 in Scottish football
