= 1909–10 Celtic F.C. season =

Scottish first division football club season results

Celtic
1909–10 season
- Manager: Willie Maley
- Stadium: Celtic Park
- Scottish Division One: 1st
- Scottish Cup: Semi-finalists

The 1909–10 Scottish football season was Celtic's 22nd season of competitive football, in which they competed in Scottish Division One. They won the League for the sixth time in a row, which was a record at the time and would remain so until Celtic itself beat it by winning nine league championships in a row from 1966 to 1974.

After having reached the final of the Scottish Cup for the previous three seasons, Celtic fell short of it losing 3-1 to Clyde in the semi-final.

Celtic won the Glasgow Cup, defeating Rangers 1-0 in the final.

== Competitions ==
=== Scottish Division One ===
==== League table ====
Pos	Team	Pld	W	D	L	GF	GA	GD	Pts	Relegation
1	Celtic (C)	34	24	6	4	63	22	+41	54	Champions
2	Falkirk	34	22	8	4	71	28	+43	52	
3	Rangers	34	20	6	8	70	35	+35	46	
4	Aberdeen	34	16	8	10	44	29	+15	40	
5	Clyde	34	14	9	11	47	40	+7	37	

(C) Champions

==== Matches ====
17 August 1909	Celtic	3–1	Hamilton Academical	Glasgow
				Stadium: Celtic Park; Attendance: 10,000

21 August 1909	Celtic	2–0	Falkirk	Glasgow
				Stadium: Celtic Park; Attendance: 22,000

28 August 1909	Hibernian	1–0	Celtic	Edinburgh
				Stadium: Easter Road; Attendance: 18,000

4 September 1909	Celtic	2–2	Motherwell	Glasgow
				Stadium: Celtic Park; Attendance: 4,000

11 September 1909	Morton	2–1	Celtic	Greenock
				Stadium: Cappielow Park; Attendance: 8,000

18 September 1909	Hamilton Academical	1–5	Celtic	Hamilton
				Stadium: Douglas Park; Attendance: 8,000

20 September 1909	Hearts	1–2	Celtic	Edinburgh
				Stadium: Tynecastle Park; Attendance: 16,500

27 September 1909	Third Lanark	0–1	Celtic	Glasgow
				Stadium: Cathkin Park; Attendance: 15,000

2 October 1909	Celtic	1–0	Dundee	Glasgow
				Stadium: Celtic Park; Attendance: 32,000

16 October 1909	Port Glasgow Athletic	2–3	Celtic	Port Glasgow
				Stadium: Clune Park; Attendance: 6,000

23 October 1909	Celtic	6–0	Queen's Park	Glasgow
				Stadium: Celtic Park; Attendance: 15,000

30 October 1909	Rangers	0–0	Celtic	Glasgow
				Stadium: Ibrox Park; Attendance: 45,000

6 November 1909	Celtic	1–0	Hearts	Glasgow
				Stadium: Celtic Park; Attendance: 16,000

13 November 1909	Partick Thistle	1–3	Celtic	Glasgow
				Stadium: Firhill Park; Attendance: 18,000

20 November 1909	Celtic	3–1	Airdrieonians	Glasgow
				Stadium: Celtic Park; Attendance: 6,000

27 November 1909	Aberdeen	0–1	Celtic	Aberdeen
				Stadium: Pittodrie Park; Attendance: 14,000

4 December 1909	Celtic	2–1	Kilmarnock	Glasgow
				Stadium: Celtic Park; Attendance: 6,000

11 December 1909	Celtic	1–1	St Mirren	Glasgow
				Stadium: Celtic Park; Attendance: 10,000

18 December 1909	Motherwell	1–3	Celtic	Motherwell
				Stadium: Fir Park; Attendance: 14,000

25 December 1909	Kilmarnock	0–1	Celtic	Kilmarnock
				Stadium: Rugby Park; Attendance: 10,000

1 January 1910	Celtic	1–1	Rangers	Glasgow
				Stadium: Celtic Park; Attendance: 47,000

3 January 1910	Clyde	0–1	Celtic	Rutherglen
				Stadium: Shawfield Stadium; Attendance: 20,000

8 January 1910	Airdrieonians	0–2	Celtic	Airdrie
				Stadium: Broomfield Park; Attendance: 4,000

15 January 1910	Celtic	4–0	Port Glasgow Athletic	Glasgow
				Stadium: Celtic Park; Attendance: 5,000

29 January 1910	St Mirren	2–1	Celtic	Paisley
				Stadium: St Mirren Park, Love Street; Attendance: 12,000

16 March 1910	Celtic	2–0	Third Lanark	Glasgow
				Stadium: Celtic Park; Attendance: 50,000

19 March 1910	Queen's Park	0–1	Celtic	Glasgow
				Stadium: Hampden Park; Attendance: 8,000

26 March 1910	Celtic	3–1	Partick Thistle	Glasgow
				Stadium: Celtic Park; Attendance: 10,000

28 March 1910	Celtic	2–1	Clyde	Glasgow
				Stadium: Celtic Park; Attendance: 6,000

6 April 1910	Celtic	3–0	Morton	Glasgow
				Stadium: Celtic Park; Attendance: 4,000

9 April 1910	Celtic	2–0	Aberdeen	Glasgow
				Stadium: Celtic Park; Attendance: 3,000

23 April 1910	Falkirk	2–0	Celtic	Falkirk
				Stadium: Brockville Park; Attendance: 10,000

25 April 1910	Celtic	0–0	Hibernian	Glasgow
				Stadium: Celtic Park; Attendance: 4,000

30 April 1910	Dundee	0–0	Celtic	Dundee
				Stadium: Dens Park; Attendance: 10,000

=== Scottish Cup ===
22 January 1910 First round	Dumbarton	1–2	Celtic	Dumbarton
				Stadium: Boghead Park; Attendance: 10,000

12 February 1910 Second round	Celtic	3–1	Third Lanark	Glasgow
				Stadium: Celtic Park; Attendance: 50,000

19 February 1910 Third round	Celtic	2–1	Aberdeen	Glasgow
				Stadium: Celtic Park; Attendance: 21,000

12 March 1910 Semi-final	Clyde	3–1	Celtic	Glasgow
				Stadium: Shawfield Stadium; Attendance: 38,000
