= Duncan Ritchie (footballer, born 1886) =

Scottish footballer (1886–1968)

Personal information
- Date of birth: 17 February 1886
- Place of birth: Renton, Scotland
- Date of death: 21 February 1968 (aged 82)
- Place of death: Alexandria, Scotland
- Position: Outside right

Senior career*
Years	Team	Apps	(Gls)
–	Renton		
1907–1911	Hibernian	41	(2)
1909–1911	→ Dumbarton (loan)	28	(7)
1911–1912	Raith Rovers	32	(4)
1912–1913	Sheffield United	13	(1)
1913–1914	Derby County	2	(0)
1914–1918	Renton		
- * Club domestic league appearances and goals

Duncan Ritchie (17 February 1886 – 21 February 1968) was a Scottish footballer who played as an outside right for Hibernian, Dumbarton, Raith Rovers, Sheffield United and Derby County, bookended by spells at non-league hometown club Renton.

Having been part of Renton's surprise run in the 1906–07 Scottish Cup (beating St Bernard's then Dundee before going out to Queen's Park in the quarter-finals), alongside his cousin, the veteran international John L. Ritchie, as well as Paddy Travers, he signed for Hibs and won the minor East of Scotland Shield in 1908 but fell out of favour and spent two seasons on loan at lower-division Dumbarton.

His most productive spell was with Raith, which led him to be considered for an international cap – he played and scored in the 1912 Home Scots v Anglo-Scots trial match – and brought him to the attention of English clubs, though after moving south of the border he appears to have made little impact in two Football League seasons. He served with the Black Watch during World War I and was wounded in France in 1915.
