= 1910–11 Celtic F.C. season =

Celtic
1910–11 season
- Manager: Willie Maley
- Stadium: Celtic Park
- Scottish First Division: 5th
- Scottish Cup: Winners

The 1910–11 Scottish football season, was Celtic's 23rd season of competitive football, in which they competed in the Scottish First Division. The Glasgow club had a disappointing League campaign as after winning six championships in a row, they would only manage to end up 5th, 11 points behind champions Rangers.

Celtic did, however, win the Scottish Cup for the 7th time, the 17th major domestic trophy ever in the club, as they defeated Hamilton Academical 2–0 in a replay on 15 April 1911, about a week after the originally scheduled final had ended in a 0–0 draw.

== Competitions ==
=== Scottish First Division ===
==== League table ====
Pos	Team	Pld	W	D	L	GF	GA	GD	Pts
3	Falkirk	34	17	10	7	65	42	+23	44
4	Partick Thistle	34	17	8	9	50	41	+9	42
5	Celtic	34	15	11	8	48	18	+30	41
6	Dundee	34	18	5	11	54	42	+12	41
7	Third Lanark	34	16	7	11	59	53	+6	39

Rules for classification: Teams finish equal if level on points. Points system: 2 points for a win, 1 point for a draw, 0 points for a loss

==== Matches ====
17 August 1910 First Division	Celtic	3–0	Airdrieonains	Glasgow
				Stadium: Celtic Park; Attendance: 8,000

20 August 1910 First Division	Falkirk	2–1	Celtic	Falkirk
				Stadium: Brockville Park; Attendance: 12,000

27 August 1910 First Division	Celtic	0–1	Morton	Glasgow
				Stadium: Celtic Park; Attendance: 5,000

3 September 1910 First Division	Kilmarnock	1–0	Celtic	Kilmarnock
				Stadium: Rugby Park; Attendance: 8,500

17 September 1910 First Division	Celtic	2–1	Dundee	Glasgow
				Stadium: Celtic Park; Attendance: 25,000

19 September 1910 First Division	Hibernian	0–4	Celtic	Edinburgh
				Stadium: Easter Road; Attendance: 12,000

26 September 1910 First Division	Partick Thistle	1–1	Celtic	Glasgow
				Stadium: Firhill Park; Attendance: 18,000

1 October 1910 First Division	Queen's Park	0–1	Celtic	Glasgow
				Stadium: Hampden Park; Attendance: 12,000

3 October 1910 First Division	Raith Rovers	2–1	Celtic	Kirkcaldy
				Stadium: Stark's Park; Attendance: 7,000

15 October 1910 First Division	Celtic	0–0	Hearts	Glasgow
				Stadium: Celtic Park; Attendance: 9,000

22 October 1910 First Division	Hamilton Academical	0–1	Celtic	Hamilton
				Stadium: Douglas Park; Attendance: 10,000

29 October 1910 First Division	Celtic	0–1	Rangers	Glasgow
				Stadium: Celtic Park; Attendance: 32,000

5 November 1910 First Division	Celtic	5–0	St Mirren	Glasgow
				Stadium: Celtic Park; Attendance: 7,000

12 November 1910 First Division	Airdrieonians	0–0	Celtic	Airdrie
				Stadium: Broomfield Park; Attendance: 8,000

19 November 1910 First Division	Celtic	0–0	Third Lanark	Glasgow
				Stadium: Celtic Park; Attendance: 8,000

26 November 1910 First Division	Dundee	1–0	Celtic	Dundee
				Stadium: Dens Park; Attendance: 18,000

3 December 1910 First Division	Celtic	3–0	Motherwell	Glasgow
				Stadium: Celtic Park; Attendance: 3,000

10 December 1910 First Division	Clyde	0–2	Celtic	Glasgow
				Stadium: Shawfield Stadium; Attendance: 15,000

17 December 1910 First Division	Celtic	2–0	Kilmarnock	Glasgow
				Stadium: Hampden Park; Attendance: 8,000

24 December 1910 First Division	Morton	1–1	Celtic	Greenock
				Stadium: Cappielow Park; Attendance: 7,000

31 December 1910 First Division	Celtic	5–0	Raith Rovers	Glasgow
				Stadium: Celtic Park; Attendance: 8,000

2 January 1911 First Division	Rangers	1–1	Celtic	Glasgow
				Stadium: Ibrox Park; Attendance: 71,500

3 January 1911 First Division	Celtic	2–0	Clyde	Glasgow
				Stadium: Celtic Park; Attendance: 15,000

7 January 1911 First Division	Celtic	2–0	Partick Thistle	Glasgow
				Stadium: Celtic Park; Attendance: 12,000

14 January 1911 First Division	Aberdeen	1–0	Celtic	Aberdeen
				Stadium: Pittodrie Park; Attendance: 13,500

21 January 1911 First Division	Celtic	0–0	Falkirk	Glasgow
				Stadium: Celtic Park; Attendance: 7,000

4 February 1911 First Division	Motherwell	2–1	Celtic	Motherwell
				Stadium: Fir Park; Attendance: 10,500

18 February 1911 First Division	Celtic	2–0	Queen's Park	Glasgow
				Stadium: Celtic Park; Attendance: 2,500

18 March 1911 First Division	St Mirren	1–1	Celtic	Paisley
				Stadium: St Mirren Park, Love Street; Attendance: 8,000

25 March 1911 First Division	Celtic	2–0	Hibernian	Glasgow
				Stadium: Celtic Park; Attendance: 4,000

1 April 1911 First Division	Hearts	1–1	Celtic	Edinburgh
				Stadium: Tynecastle Park; Attendance: 12,000

17 April 1911 First Division	Third Lanark	1–1	Celtic	Glasgow
				Stadium: Cathkin Park; Attendance: 8,000

26 April 1911 First Division	Celtic	3–0	Hamilton Academical	Glasgow
				Stadium: Celtic Park; Attendance: 2,000

29 April 1911 First Division	Celtic	0–0	Aberdeen	Glasgow
				Stadium: Celtic Park; Attendance: 3,000

=== Scottish Cup ===
28 January 1911 First round	Celtic	2–0	St Mirren	Glasgow
				Stadium: Celtic Park; Attendance: 15,000

11 February 1911 Second round	Celtic	1–0	Galston	Glasgow
				Stadium: Celtic Park; Attendance: 5,000

25 February 1911 Third round	Celtic	1–0	Clyde	Glasgow
				Stadium: Celtic Park; Attendance: 40,000

11 March 1911 Semi-final	Celtic	1–0	Aberdeen	Glasgow
				Stadium: Celtic Park; Attendance: 48,000

8 April 1911 Final	Celtic	0–0	Hamilton Academical	Glasgow
				Stadium: Ibrox Park; Attendance: 45,000

15 April 1911 Final Replay	Celtic	2–0	Hamilton Academical	Glasgow
				Stadium: Ibrox Park; Attendance: 25,000
