= Meadow Park, Dumbarton =

Scottish football ground

Meadow Park
- Location within West Dunbartonshire
- Location: Dumbarton, Scotland
- Coordinates: 55.9486°N 4.5679°W
- Record attendance: 3,000
- Surface: Grass
- Closed: 1950

Tenants
- Dumbarton (–1879); Dumbarton Harp (1894–1925)

Meadow Park was a football ground in Dumbarton, Scotland. Located next to Dumbarton Central railway station, it was the home ground of Dumbarton and Dumbarton Harp during its history.

== History ==
Meadow Park was the second ground used by Dumbarton after they relocated from Townend. Dumbarton remained at Meadow Park until moving to Boghead Park in 1879. Dumbarton Harp played at Meadow Park from their foundation in 1894. By World War I a pavilion had been built in the south-east corner of the ground. In 1923 the club were elected into the Scottish Football League (SFL), and around the same time, a stand was erected on the western side of the pitch. The first SFL match played at Meadow Park was on 25 August 1923, when Harp lost 3–2 to Clackmannan. The ground's probable record attendance of 3,000 was set later in the season for a Scottish Qualifying Cup match against Queen of the South in October 1923.

Harp folded in 1925; their last league match at the ground was played on 25 January 1925, a 3–1 defeat to Dykehead in front of only 140 spectators, their lowest recorded attendance during their time in the SFL. Meadow Park remained in use as a football ground until 1950, when the pavilion and stand were demolished and it was left as an open playing field. The site is now an industrial estate.
