= Newfield Park, Johnstone =

Football ground in Scotland

Newfield Park
- Location within Renfrewshire
- Location: Johnstone, Scotland
- Coordinates: 55.8398°N 4.5171°W
- Surface: Grass
- Record attendance: 7,000

Construction
- Opened: 1894

Tenant
- Johnstone F.C. (1894–1927)

Newfield Park was a football ground in Johnstone, Scotland. It was the home ground of Johnstone F.C. from 1894 until the club folded in 1927.

== History ==
Johnstone moved to Newfield Park in 1894, a site located directly to the north of Newfield railway station; the ground had previously been used by the Johnstone Harp club. The facilities initially consisted of a pavilion at the eastern end of the ground, but by 1912 a stand had been erected on the southern side of the pitch and a new pavilion in the south-west corner of the ground. In 1912 the club were admitted to Division Two of the Scottish Football League, and the first SFL match was played at the ground on 24 August 1912, a 2–1 win over Dumbarton. The pavilion was burned down in 1919.

The probable record attendance of 7,000 was set for a Scottish Cup second round match against Falkirk on 27 January 1923, with the visitors winning 1–0. The club dropped out of the SFL when Division Three was disbanded at the end of the 1925–26 season, with the final SFL match at Newfield Park being a 3–2 defeat to Brechin City on 10 April 1926.

Although Johnstone folded the following year, the ground continued to be used until it was eventually demolished to make way for the A737 bypass.
