= Pat Reilly =

Scottish football manager (1873-1937)

Personal information
- Full name: Patrick Reilly
- Date of birth: 11 February 1873
- Place of birth: Dundee, Scotland
- Date of death: 6 April 1937 (age 64)
- Place of death: Dundee, Scotland

Managerial career
- Years: Team
- 1909–15: Dundee Hibernian
- 1917–22: Dundee Hibernian

Patrick Reilly (11 February 1873 – 6 April 1937) was a Scottish football manager, who was the first ever manager of Dundee Hibernian, forerunner of Dundee United.

== Early life and business career ==
Reilly was born to Irish parents in Dundee, the eldest of five children. He was a bicycle trader and manufacturer together with his father and his two younger brothers. The family lived in the West End of the city, where Reilly had a cycle shop on Perth Road.

== Career ==
He became manager-secretary from the initial forming of Dundee Hibernian in 1909. A two-year spell aside, when he remained club secretary, Reilly was in charge for the first thirteen years of Dundee Hibs' existence, leaving just before the name change to Dundee United. It is widely acknowledged that Reilly was instrumental in forming the club, and that without him, there would have been no Dundee United.

He donated a bicycle to the player who scored the first goal at Tannadice Park, John O'Hara of Hibernian.

In February 2015 Reilly was inducted into the Dundee United Hall of Fame, the first non-player to be inducted along with manager Jim McLean.
