= Recreation Grounds, Perth =

Stadium in Perth, Scotland

Recreation Grounds
- Location within Perth and Kinross
- Location: Perth, Scotland
- Coordinates: 56.402°N 3.461°W
- Owner: St Johnstone F.C.
- Record attendance: 12,000 (approx.)
- Opened: 15 August 1885
- Closed: 1924

The Recreation Grounds, opened in 1885, was the first home of St Johnstone F.C., a football club based in Perth, Scotland. It met their requirements for almost forty years, until the club moved to the other side of the town, opening Muirton Park in 1924.

== History ==
The St Johnstone football club was formed by members of the town's cricket club, who were seeking a suitable sport to occupy them during the months when cricket was not in season. Well-known local curler George Valentine was the football club's first President.

The twenty members of the newly formed football club contributed one Scottish pound each to lease suitable land at Craigie Haugh, near the South Inch park and across from where Perth Prison stands today. The land, leased from Sir Robert Moncrieffe, became known as the Recreation Grounds. The football ground was typical of its era but very basic by today's standard. A small grandstand and pavilion (described as "dilapidated" in the minutes of a 1924 meeting) was the only shelter for spectators; the rest of the crowd watched matches while standing on a grassy banking around the remainder of the pitch. The grandstand had not been built new in 1885 - it had previously housed spectators watching horse racing on the North Inch.

The Recreation Grounds were officially opened on 15 August 1885; however, somewhat unusually, the home club didn't participate in the match. The now-defunct Our Boys, from the city of Dundee down the River Tay, were beaten 6-0 by Queen's Park from Glasgow. Gate receipts were £50.

It was at the Recreation Grounds that St Johnstone played its first match in the Scottish Football League. On Saturday, 19 August 1911, Arthurlie from East Renfrewshire were defeated 4–1 in a Division Two match. Ticket sales netted a profit of £40. The club was also involved in some high-scoring matches in the early years of its existence. They achieved their record victory of 15-0 twice during their first decade. The club also suffered all of its record defeats at the Recreation Grounds.

At a meeting in February 1924, during which shareholders met to discuss the club's options for a new football ground, the following is recorded in the minutes:

"Regarding the old or present site. Not being conversant with the history of the club, nor of the reasons why such a situation was selected, it is unnecessary for me to deal, beyond expressing some surprise that cramped area with unprepossing surroundings along with an extremely bad access - specially for vehicles should have been laid out as a football field by an outstanding club."

At the end of the meeting, it was agreed unanimously to choose the Muirton Park site for the club's future.

The club moved to its current location, McDiarmid Park, after selling the Muirton Park site to the Asda supermarket chain in the late 1980s.

== Facts and figures ==
- Highest attendance: 12,000 (approx.) v. Clydebank, 14 April 1923
- First match: Queen's Park (6) v. Our Boys (Dundee) (0)
- Last match: St Johnstone (4) v. Kilmarnock (2)
