= Johnstone F.C. =

Former association football club in Scotland

Johnstone
- Full name: Johnstone Football Club
- Nickname: the Johnstonians
- Founded: 1878
- Dissolved: 1927
- Ground: Newfield Park, Johnstone
1880–96 colours	1909–20 colours

Johnstone Football Club was a football club based at Newfield Park in Johnstone, Renfrewshire in Scotland. The club was a member of the Scottish Football League in two spells between 1912 and 1915, then 1921 and 1926.

== History ==
The club was formed in 1878. By 1880 there were four senior clubs in the town, and in 1881 the Johnstone chairman, Bailie Love, made tentative suggestions of combining the Johnstone and Johnstone Athletic sides. Athletic folded in 1884, but in 1885 Johnstone merged with Johnstone Rovers; despite Rovers being the bigger side (its 200 members being double that of Johnstone's membership), the merged club used the simple Johnstone name, Johnstone's navy colours, and Johnstone's Cartbank Park. This may have been because Johnstone had been the most successful side in the town, having won the first three Johnstone & District Cups. The merger may not have received unanimous support, as the Johnstone Harp club was founded in 1886 (many of the figures involved in the Rovers had Irish roots); however Harp did not survive into the 1890s.

The club had reached the fourth round of the Scottish Cup in 1881–82 and 1882–83 (one of the last 22 clubs in both seasons); it lost 3–1 at Queen's Park in the former year, albeit aided by the Q.P. losing Harry McNeil to injury early in the game, and at home to Pollokshields Athletic by the same score in the latter, the Johnstonians conceding the decisive goal when disputing the award of a throw-in. It did not renew its subscription after the 1886–87 season. It rejoined in 1891, after Harp folded,

After spending time in minor leagues, Johnstone joined the Scottish Football Alliance in 1894 after most of its membership had moved to the new Scottish League Division Two. In the same year the club moved to Newfield Park. During this time the club demonstrated its potential in the Scottish Cup by beating Greenock Abstainers 20–0 in a first round tie on 5 September 1891. In subsequent seasons they would play in the North Ayrshire Football League and, from 1898 until 1905, the Scottish Football Combination. It was also a regular entrant into the Renfrewshire Cup and the Renfrewshire Victoria Cup (the latter originally for smaller sides); it reached the final of the former in 1906–07, 1910–11, and 1924–25, but won the latter in 1899–1900, 1908–09, 1910–11, 1914–15, and 1919–20. In 1914–15, Johnstone and Morton reached the final of both tournaments, and instead of separate finals, a two-legged tie was used as the final for both. Johnstone won the first leg 3–0, and at half-time at Cappielow Park, the second leg was still goalless; however Morton scored four goals in a second-half burst - one a penalty - to take both titles.

Johnstone joined the Scottish Football Union in 1908 and from this league, one of the strongest leagues outside the Scottish League at the time, the club were admitted to the Scottish Football League when Division Two was expanded for the 1912–13 season. When the league was reduced to a single division in 1915, due to World War I, Johnstone played in the Western League. Johnstone returned to the Scottish League when the second division was reinstated in 1921. Johnstone were relegated to the new Third Division at the end of the 1924–25 season. When this division was disbanded at the end of the following season, Johnstone returned to the Football Alliance. They remained in this league until 1927 when they were wound up.

== Colours ==
The club never had a consistent colour scheme, although it mostly wore shades of blue until 1904, and black & amber from 1909 to 1923.

- 1877?–1880? Navy blue shirts, navy blue shorts, navy blue & white hooped socks.
- 1880–1896 Navy blue shirts, white shorts, navy blue socks.
- 1896–1902 Royal blue shirts, white shorts, royal blue socks.
- 1902–1903 Maroon shirts, white shorts, maroon socks.
- 1903–1904 Royal blue shirts, white shorts, royal blue socks.
- 1907–1909 Black & white striped shirts, white shorts, black socks.
- 1909–1920 Black & gold striped shirts, white shorts, black socks with 2 gold bands on top.
- 1921–1923 Black & gold striped shirts, black shorts, black socks with 2 gold bands on top.
- 1923–1927 White shirts with black collar & cuffs, white shorts, black socks with 2 white bands on top.

== Ground ==
The club lost its Cartbank ground in 1886 after the landlords, Finlayson Boutsfield & Co, required it for business purposes; the club had to move temporarily to the old Glenpatrick ground, not an ideal solution as the ground was in Elderslie, a slight distance from the town. By 1891 it was playing at Mossbank Park (the former Athletic ground), but at the end of the 1891–92 season faced an interdict after a Mr J. B. Stirling, living nearby, complained about the crowd noise. In 1893 it moved to Newfield Park, the former Harp ground.

== Former players ==
- Notable players ( 32 )
