= New Ralston Park =

Former football ground in Paisley, Scotland

- Location within Renfrewshire
- Location: Paisley, Scotland
- Coordinates: 55.8457°N 4.4035°W
- Owner: Paisley Town Council
- Surface: Grass
- Record attendance: 7,000

Construction
- Opened: 1909
- Closed: 1920

Tenant
- Abercorn (1909–1920)

New Ralston Park was a football ground in Paisley, Scotland. It was the home ground of Abercorn during their third decade in the Scottish Football League.

== History ==
Abercorn moved to the ground in 1909 from the Old Ralston Park, which was located directly to the east on the other side of the Lady Burn. A 520-capacity wooden stand was built on the north-western side of the pitch, and the pavilion that had been part of Old Ralston Park (and now in the north-east corner of the new ground) continued to be used.

The first league match at New Ralston Park was played on 11 September 1909, with 2,000 spectators watching Abercorn winning 2–1 against Ayr Parkhouse, who had also been their final opponents at Old Ralston Park. The ground's record attendance of 7,000 was set for a Scottish Qualifying Cup game against Nithsdale Wanderers on 30 November 1912, with Abercorn winning 1–0.

Abercorn remained at the ground until 1920, although the final SFL game at New Ralston Park was played on 6 March 1915 with Abercorn drawing 1–1 against Leith Athletic; the league was subsequently suspended due to World War I. In 1920 the club's lease on the ground was ended at the behest of Paisley Town Council. This was ostensibly in order to build an ice rink, which did not happen for another four years. It was long accused that Paisley rivals St Mirren had used their connections with the town council to kill off their rivals. Unable to secure another ground within the town, this effectively spelled the end of Abercorn. The site was later used for a skating rink and is now a car park.
