= North End Park =

Former football ground in Scotland

- Colliers Den
- Location within Fife
- Location: Cowdenbeath, Scotland
- Coordinates: 56.1144°N 3.3428°W
- Surface: Grass

Construction
- Opened: 1888
- Closed: 2013

Tenants
- Cowdenbeath F.C. (1888–1917); Hearts of Beath

North End Park, also known as Colliers Den, is a disused playing field in Cowdenbeath. Between 1888 and 1917 the site was a football ground and the home venue of Cowdenbeath F.C. It was later the home ground of Fife amateur club Hearts of Beath and was also used as a greyhound racing stadium from the 1930s until the 1970s, before the site was sold for development.

== History ==
Cowdenbeath moved to North End Park from their previous ground, Jubilee Park, in 1888. A stand was built on the northern side of the pitch, but the pitch was later rotated 45º to allow for the creation of a whippet racing track. The original stand remained in place and an open seated stand was later built on the south-eastern side of the pitch.

Cowdenbeath joined the Division Two of the Scottish Football League (SFL) in 1905, and the first SFL match was played at North End Park on 19 August 1905, a 1–0 win over Leith Athletic. In 1917 the club moved to Central Park. As the SFL had been suspended since 1915 due to World War I, the final league match at the ground had been played on 20 February 1915, a 2–1 win over Clydebank. After Cowdenbeath left the site, it became a playing field and continued to be used for football.

It later became known as the North End Greyhound Stadium for a number of years starting in 1938. The track was independent (unlicensed) and was in direct competition with Central Park until the latter closed to greyhound racing in 1965. North End Park continued to host the racing on Tuesday and Friday evenings at 7.15pm until the 1970s. The circumference was 400 yards with race distances of 289 and 489 yards.

In 2013 Fife Council gave permission for a supermarket to be built on the site, with a replacement football facility being built in nearby Lumphinnans. Although the new facility was built and Hearts of Beath moved to the new site, Tesco pulled out of building the supermarket, selling the site to a property developer in August 2015.
