= Dunterlie Park (1906–1919) =

Former football ground in Barrhead, Scotland

- Location within East Renfrewshire
- Location: Barrhead, Scotland
- Coordinates: 55.8077°N 4.3919°W
- Surface: Grass

Construction
- Opened: 1906
- Closed: 1919

Tenant
- Arthurlie

Dunterlie Park was a football ground in Barrhead, Scotland. It was the home ground of Arthurlie between 1906 and 1919, and was the second of three grounds to bear the same name.

== History ==
Arthurlie moved to Dunterlie Park in 1906, naming it after their former ground, where they had been based since 1882. Located next to the Glasgow, Barrhead and Kilmarnock Joint Railway line, the only spectator facility was a small open stand in front of the pavilion located in the southern corner of the pitch. The first league match was played at the new Dunterlie Park on 25 August 1906, a 5–4 win over Vale of Leven.

In 1919 the club moved to the current Dunterlie Park. Their final league match at the ground had been played early in World War I prior to the suspension of the Scottish Football League, a 5–3 win over Lochgelly United on 3 April 1915. The site was later used for industrial purposes, and is now part of Shanks Industrial Park.
