= Meadow Park, Coatbridge =

Football ground in Coatbridge, Scotland

Meadow Park
- Location within North Lanarkshire
- Location: Coatbridge, Scotland
- Coordinates: 55.8518°N 4.0142°W
- Surface: Grass

Construction
- Opened: 1882

Tenants
- Albion Rovers

Meadow Park was a football ground in the Whifflet area of Coatbridge, Scotland. It was the home ground of Albion Rovers from 1882 until 1919.

== History ==
Albion Rovers moved to Meadow Park from their previous ground, Cowheath Park, in 1882. The new ground was sandwiched between two railway lines, and a grandstand and pavilion were erected on the western side of the pitch. During the club's tenure at the ground the roof of the grandstand was blown off twice.

Albion joined the Scottish Football League (SFL) in 1903, and the first SFL match was played at the ground on 15 August 1903, a 2–2 draw with Leith Athletic in front of 2,000 spectators. The club's highest recorded league attendance at the ground was 4,000 for a 3–1 win over Cowdenbeath on 3 January 1914.

In 1919 the club moved to Cliftonhill. As the SFL had been suspended during World War I, the club's final league match at the ground had been on 6 March 1915, a 4–1 win over Vale of Leven. The pavilion was moved to the new ground, but it was not ready in time for the start of the 1919–20 season, resulting in the club playing home matches at Broomfield Park in nearby Airdrie until late December.

Football continued to be played at the ground following Albion's departure, as it was used by a junior club. However, the site was later turned into an electrical substation.
