= 1920–21 Dumbarton F.C. season =

Dumbarton
1920–1921 season
- Manager: James Collins
- Stadium: Boghead Park, Dumbarton
- Scottish League: 21st
- Scottish Cup: Fourth round
- Top goalscorer: League: Duncan Walker (15); All: Duncan Walker (21)
- Highest home attendance: 10,000
- Lowest home attendance: 2,000
- Average home league attendance: 4,000
Home colours

The 1920–21 season was the 44th Scottish football season in which Dumbarton competed at national level, entering the Scottish Football League and the Scottish Cup. In addition Dumbarton entered the Dumbartonshire Cup and the Dumbartonshire Charity Cup.

== Scottish League ==
Dumbarton witnessed a slump in form finishing in 21st-place out of 22, with 24 points, well behind champions Rangers. In addition to an outflow of some of the team's talent, the inability to score was also a problem, and with just 41 goals to their credit, Dumbarton finishing up as lowest scorers in the league.

| 19 August 1920 League | Partick Thistle | 1–0 | Dumbarton | Firhill Park |
| | Kinloch 22' | | | Attendance: 15,000; Referee: H Humphreys |

| 21 August 1920 League | Dumbarton | 1–0 | Clydebank | Boghead Park |
| | Scott 89' | | | Attendance: 4,000; Referee: T McMillan |

| 25 August 1920 League | Dumbarton | 1–2 | Morton | Boghead Park |
| | McDiarmid 70' | | Gourlay 80'; French | Attendance: 3,000 |

| 28 August 1920 League | Dumbarton | 1–1 | Dundee | Boghead Park |
| | Marshall 81' | | Bell 30' | Attendance: 3,000; Referee: J Binnie |

| 31 August 1920 League | Clyde | 2–1 | Dumbarton | Shawfield Stadium |
| | Marshall 12'; Thomson 75' (pen.) | | Walker 30' | Attendance: 7,000; Referee: R Kelso |

| 4 September 1920 League | Hamilton | 1–1 | Dumbarton | Douglas Park |
| | Pollock 35' | | McDonald 5' | Attendance: 5,000; Referee: L Wynne |

| 7 September 1920 League | Queen's Park | 3–0 | Dumbarton | Hampden Park |
| | Gillespie 35'; Fyfe 55' (pen.) | | | Attendance: 6,000; Referee: A Jackson |

| 11 September 1920 League | Dumbarton | 0–4 | Albion Rovers | Boghead Park |
| | | | White 55'; Duncan 80' (pen.); Blue | Attendance: 3,000; Referee: W Bell |

| 16 September 1920 League | Ayr United | 3–0 | Dumbarton | Somerset Park |
| | Stevenson 25', 90'; Richardson | | | Attendance: 3,000; Referee: J Stevenson |

| 18 September 1920 League | Hibernian | 2–0 | Dumbarton | Easter Road Stadium |
| | Anderson 1'; Templeton 75' (pen.) | | | Attendance: 10,000; Referee: W Bell |

| 25 September 1920 League | Dumbarton | 0–2 | Clyde | Boghead Park |
| | | | Duncan 10', 65' | Attendance: 4,000; Referee: A McMahon |

| 2 October 1920 League | Morton | 4–1 | Dumbarton | Cappielow Park |
| | Stevenson 8', 89'; French 13'; Miller 14' | | Browning | Attendance: 10,000; Referee: W Bell |

| 9 October 1920 League | Dumbarton | 2–5 | Rangers | Boghead Park |
| | McDiarmid 45'; Fraser 60' | | Meiklejohn 20'; Morton; Cairns 50'; Cunningham 55' | Attendance: 10,000; Referee: J Lyons |

| 16 October 1920 League | Raith Rovers | 3–1 | Dumbarton | Starks Park |
| | Birrell; Waitt | | Raeside 70' | Attendance: 3,000; Referee: W Campbell |

| 23 October 1920 League | Dumbarton | 4–0 | Queen's Park | Boghead Park |
| | McDiarmid 30' 82'; Walker 35'; Browning 80' | | | Attendance: 3,000; Referee: J Kelso |

| 30 October 1920 League | Airdrie | 1–1 | Dumbarton | Broomfield Park |
| | McLean | | Walker | Attendance: 5,000; Referee: W Stevenson |

| 6 November 1920 League | Dumbarton | 1–3 | Celtic | Boghead Park |
| | Walker 45' | | Cringan 30'; Cassidy 65'; McLean 85' | Attendance: 10,000; Referee: W Bell |

| 13 November 1920 League | Third Lanark | 4–0 | Dumbarton | Cathkin Park |
| | Orr 15' (pen.); Welsh 42'; Walker, F 46' 75' | | | Attendance: 4,000; Referee: J Howden |

| 20 November 1920 League | Motherwell | 8–2 | Dumbarton | Fir Park |
| | Lennie 76'; Robertson 30'; Ferguson 35', 75', 80', 89'; Rankine 45' | | Walker 2' | Attendance: 5,000; Referee: T Dougray |

| 27 November 1920 League | Dumbarton | 0–1 | Aberdeen | Boghead Park |
| | | | Middleton 30' | Attendance: 2,000; Referee: J Stevenson |

| 4 December 1920 League | Dumbarton | 0–1 | Partick Thistle | Boghead Park |
| | | | McMullan 60' | Attendance: 3,000; Referee: A Edward |

| 11 December 1920 League | St Mirren | 4–1 | Dumbarton | Love Street (stadium) |
| | Love 5', 50'; Anderson; Lawson | | Walker | Attendance: 6,000; Referee: H Humphreys |

| 18 December 1920 League | Dumbarton | 1–0 | Kilmarnock | Boghead Park |
| | Walker 5' | | | Attendance: 3,000; Referee: J Lyons |

| 25 December 1920 League | Hearts | 6–2 | Dumbarton | Tynecastle Stadium |
| | Forbes 3'; Murphy; Wilson; Sharp | | McDiarmid 47'; McTavish (pen.) | Attendance: 12,500; Referee: W Bell |

| 1 January 1921 League | Dumbarton | 0–1 | Ayr United | Boghead Park |
| | | | Stevenson | Attendance: 8,000; Referee: J Binnie |

| 5 January 1921 League | Clydebank | 1–2 | Dumbarton | Clydeholm Park |
| | Paton 85' | | Somerville 7'; Walker 30' | Attendance: 6,000; Referee: A Allan |

| 8 January 1921 League | Falkirk | 5–1 | Dumbarton | Brockville Park |
| | Glancy; Kane; Gowdy | | Walker | Attendance: 7,000; Referee: J Martin |

| 15 January 1921 League | Dumbarton | 2–0 | Raith Rovers | Boghead Park |
| | Walker 5'; Browning 75' | | | Attendance: 3,000; Referee: G McKenzie |

| 22 January 1921 League | Rangers | 2–0 | Dumbarton | Ibrox Park |
| | Cunningham 44'; Cairns 85' | | | Attendance: 15,000; Referee: G McKenzie |

| 29 January 1921 League | Dundee | 2–1 | Dumbarton | Dens Park |
| | Thomas (pen.); Bell | | Walker | Attendance: 16,000; Referee: J Stevenson |

| 12 February 1921 League | Dumbarton | 1–2 | Airdrie | Boghead Park |
| | Mannion | | Henderson | Attendance: 4,000; Referee: A Jackson |

| 23 February 1921 League | Kilmarnock | 4–1 | Dumbarton | Rugby Park |
| | Culley; Gibson; Smith, M Smith, J | | Walker | Attendance: 1,500; Referee: J Black |

| 26 February 1921 League | Dumbarton | 2–0 | Motherwell | Boghead Park |
| | Somerville; McDiarmid 80' | | | Attendance: 3,000; Referee: T McMillan |

| 7 March 1921 League | Dumbarton | 4–1 | Falkirk | Boghead Park |
| | Early 35'; McDiarmid 40'; Mctavish; Chalmers 78' | | Glancy 5' | Attendance: 2,000 |

| 12 March 1921 League | Dumbarton | 1–0 | Hibernian | Boghead Park |
| | McTavish 22' | | | Attendance: 3,000; Referee: J Stevenson |

| 19 March 1921 League | Dumbarton | 0–1 | Third Lanark | Boghead Park |
| | | | Walker, F | Attendance: 3,000; Referee: A McMahon |

| 26 March 1921 League | Aberdeen | 2–0 | Dumbarton | Pittodrie Stadium |
| | Fisher | | | Attendance: 12,000; Referee: W Bell |

| 2 April 1921 League | Celtic | 1–1 | Dumbarton | Celtic Park |
| | McStay 25' (pen.) | | Walker 30' | Attendance: 10,000; Referee: T McMillan |

| 8 April 1921 League | Dumbarton | 1–0 | St Mirren | Boghead Park |
| | Walker 42' | | | Attendance: 3,000; Referee: J Binnie |

| 11 April 1921 League | Dumbarton | 0–3 | Hearts | Boghead Park |
| | | | Wilson 20'; Meikle 25', 75' | Attendance: 3,000; Referee: J Sinclair |

| 16 April 1921 League | Dumbarton | 3–0 | Hamilton | Boghead Park |
| | Mannion; Fraser | | | Attendance: 3,000; Referee: G Robertson |

| 23 April 1921 League | Albion Rovers | 3–0 | Dumbarton | Cliftonhill Stadium |
| | Kiernan 10', 53'; Greenshields | | | Attendance: 6,000; Referee: A Edward |

=== Promotion/relegation Election ===
The bottom two clubs - Dumbarton and St Mirren - retained their places in the Scottish League. Although the Scottish Second Division had not yet reformed, there was one applicant for promotion - Central League champions, Dunfermline Athletic. However they failed to find a proposer and seconder in the vote.

== Scottish Cup ==
Dumbarton reached the fourth round before losing out to Rangers.

| 5 February 1921 Cup R2 | Dumbarton | 3–0 | Elgin City | Boghead Park |
| | Walker 20'; McDiarmid | | | Attendance: 4,000; Referee: A McMahon |

| 19 February 1921 Cup R3 | Nithsdale Wanderers | 5–0 | Elgin City | Boghead Park |
| | Walker 25' 75' 76'; McDiarmid 30' | | | Attendance: 4,500; Referee: H Humphreys |

| 5 March 1921 Cup R4 | Dumbarton | 0–3 | Rangers | Boghead Park |
| | | | Bowie 10'; Cunningham 48'; Henderson | Attendance: 6,000; Referee: T McMillan |

== Dumbartonshire Cup ==
Dumbarton again failed to progress from the sectional stage of the Dumbartonshire Cup.

| 6 January 1921 Group | Dumbarton | 3–2 | Dumbarton Harp | Boghead Park |
| | Rae; Mannion; Walker | | Goal | Attendance: 4,000 |

| 13 April 1921 Group | Dumbarton | 2–2 | Renton | Boghead Park |
| | Chalmers | | Lyle; Haddow | Attendance: 2,000 |

| 20 April 1921 Group | Vale of Leven | 2–1 | Dumbarton | Millburn Park |
| | Robertson 9'; Johnstone 65' | | Fraser 44' | Attendance: 2,000 |

| 25 April 1921 Group | Clydebank | 2–2 | Dumbarton | Clydeholm Park |
| | McLavin 65'; Fulton | | McDiarmid 25'; McTavish 70' | Attendance: 2,000 |

=== Final league table ===
| Pos | Team | Pld | W | D | L | GF | GA | GD | Pts |
|---|---|---|---|---|---|---|---|---|---|
| 1 | Vale of Leven | 4 | 3 | 0 | 1 | 5 | 3 | +2 | 6 |
| 2 | Clydebank | 4 | 2 | 1 | 1 | 7 | 5 | +2 | 5 |
| 3 | Dumbarton | 4 | 1 | 2 | 1 | 8 | 8 | 0 | 4 |
| 4 | Renton | 3 | 1 | 1 | 1 | 4 | 7 | −3 | 3 |
| 5 | Dumbarton Harp | 3 | 1 | 0 | 2 | 4 | 5 | −1 | 2 |

== Dumbartonshire Charity Cup ==
Following a draw with Vale of Leven in the semi-final, a replay date could not be arranged and Dumbarton agreed to scratch from the competition.

| 11 May 1921 Semi-final | Vale of Leven | 1–1 (a.e.t.) | Dumbarton | Millburn Park |
| | Goal | | Grainger | Attendance: 2,000 |

== Friendlies ==
| 11 August 1920 Friendly | Rothesay Juniors | 0–1 | Dumbarton | Rothesay, Bute |
| | | | Marshall | Attendance: 2,000 |

== Player statistics ==
=== Squad ===
| No. | Pos | Nat | Player | Total | | First Division | | Scottish Cup | |
| No. | Pos | Nat | Player | Apps | Goals | Apps | Goals | Apps | Goals |
|---|---|---|---|---|---|---|---|---|---|
| | GK | (Scotland) SCO | John Hagen | 1 | 0 | 1 | 0 | 0 | 0 |
| | GK | (Scotland) SCO | John Miller | 29 | 0 | 27 | 0 | 2 | 0 |
| | GK | (Scotland) SCO | Percy Wharrier | 15 | 0 | 14 | 0 | 1 | 0 |
| | DF | (Scotland) SCO | Peter Brown | 20 | 0 | 20 | 0 | 0 | 0 |
| | DF | (Scotland) SCO | Donald Colman | 20 | 0 | 17 | 0 | 3 | 0 |
| | DF | (Scotland) SCO | Alex Marshall | 5 | 1 | 5 | 1 | 0 | 0 |
| | DF | (Scotland) SCO | Ernest Somerville | 15 | 2 | 14 | 2 | 1 | 0 |
| | DF | (England) ENG | Joseph Till | 38 | 0 | 35 | 0 | 3 | 0 |
| | MF | (Ireland) EIR | Harry Chatton | 13 | 0 | 13 | 0 | 0 | 0 |
| | MF | (Scotland) SCO | Eli Cotterill | 1 | 0 | 1 | 0 | 0 | 0 |
| | MF | (Scotland) SCO | Archibald Mackie | 11 | 0 | 11 | 0 | 0 | 0 |
| | MF | (Scotland) SCO | James McDonald | 17 | 1 | 17 | 1 | 0 | 0 |
| | MF | (Scotland) SCO | Thomas Raeside | 36 | 1 | 33 | 1 | 3 | 0 |
| | MF | (Scotland) SCO | James Scott | 37 | 1 | 34 | 1 | 3 | 0 |
| | MF | (Scotland) SCO | Pat Travers | 19 | 0 | 16 | 0 | 3 | 0 |
| | FW | (Scotland) SCO | John Browning | 35 | 3 | 32 | 3 | 3 | 0 |
| | FW | (Scotland) SCO | Andrew Chalmers | 8 | 1 | 8 | 1 | 0 | 0 |
| | FW | (Scotland) SCO | Peter Currie | 4 | 0 | 4 | 0 | 0 | 0 |
| | FW | (Scotland) SCO | Arthur Early | 12 | 1 | 10 | 1 | 2 | 0 |
| | FW | (Scotland) SCO | William Fraser | 8 | 2 | 8 | 2 | 0 | 0 |
| | FW | (Scotland) SCO | Charles Gordon | 5 | 0 | 5 | 0 | 0 | 0 |
| | FW | (Scotland) SCO | Thomas Mannion | 23 | 3 | 20 | 3 | 3 | 0 |
| | FW | (Scotland) SCO | Thomas Maxwell | 7 | 0 | 7 | 0 | 0 | 0 |
| | FW | (Scotland) SCO | Bob McDermid | 41 | 9 | 38 | 7 | 3 | 2 |
| | FW | (Scotland) SCO | John McMillan | 4 | 0 | 4 | 0 | 0 | 0 |
| | FW | (Scotland) SCO | John McTavish | 22 | 3 | 22 | 3 | 0 | 0 |
| | FW | (Scotland) SCO | George Rae | 12 | 0 | 12 | 0 | 0 | 0 |
| | FW | (Scotland) SCO | Smith | 1 | 0 | 1 | 0 | 0 | 0 |
| | FW | (Scotland) SCO | Duncan Walker | 36 | 21 | 33 | 15 | 3 | 6 |

=== Transfers ===
==== Players in ====
| Player | From | Date |
|---|---|---|
| (Scotland) Peter Brown | (Scotland) Renton | 2 May 1920 |
| (Scotland) John Browning | (Scotland) Vale of Leven | 2 May 1920 |
| (Scotland) Thomas Maxwell | (Scotland) Dumbarton Harp | 28 May 1920 |
| (Scotland) Peter Currie | (Scotland) Clyde | 15 Jun 1920 |
| (Scotland) Percy Wharrier | (Scotland) Dumbarton Harp | 23 Jun 1920 |
| (Scotland) George Rae | (Scotland) Dunfermline Athletic | 7 Aug 1920 |
| (Scotland) Archibald Mackie | (Scotland) Kilmarnock | 14 Aug 1920 |
| (Scotland) Thomas Mannion | (Scotland) Duntocher Hibs | 8 Sep 1920 |
| (Scotland) William Fraser | (Scotland) Kirkintilloch Rob Roy | 9 Sep 1920 |
| (Republic of Ireland) Harry Chatton | (Scotland) Kirkintilloch Rob Roy | 22 Sep 1920 |
| (Scotland) John McTavish | (Scotland) East Fife (loan) | 22 Oct 1920 |
| (Scotland) Ernest Somerville | (Scotland) Clydebank | 24 Oct 1920 |
| (Scotland) Eli Cotterill | (Scotland) Chesterton (loan) | 18 Nov 1920 |
| (Scotland) John McMillan | (Scotland) Duntocher Hibs | 3 Dec 1920 |
| (Scotland) Arthur Early | (Scotland) Third Lanark | 14 Dec 1920 |
| (Scotland) Donald Colman | (Scotland) Aberdeen | 28 Dec 1920 |
| (Scotland) Andrew Chalmers | (Scotland) Girvan | 15 Feb 1921 |

==== Players out ====
| Player | To | Date |
|---|---|---|
| (Scotland) Alexander Thom | (Scotland) Morton | 25 May 1920 |
| (Scotland) Alex Bennett | (Scotland) Albion Rovers | 19 Jul 1920 |
| (Scotland) George Rae | (Scotland) Dunfermline Athletic | 23 Oct 1920 |
| (Scotland) Archibald Mackie | (Scotland) Clydebank | 5 Jan 1921 |
| (Scotland) Peter Currie | (Scotland) East Stirling | 28 Jan 1921 |
| (Scotland) Peter Brown | (Scotland) Renton | 29 Jan 1921 |
| (Scotland) Duncan Walker | (Scotland) St Mirren | 8 Apr 1921 |
| (Scotland) James Scott | (Scotland) Third Lanark | 29 Apr 1921 |
| (Scotland) John Duffus | (England) Millwall | 20 May 1921 |
| (Scotland) Scott Duncan | (Scotland) Cowdenbeath (loan) | |
| (Scotland) Alfred Gettins | (Scotland) Kings Park | |
| (Scotland) Charles Gordon | (Scotland) Johnstone | |
| (Scotland) John Hagan | (Scotland) Dumbarton Harp | |
| (Scotland) James Martin | (Scotland) Bo'ness | |
| (Scotland) Thomas Maxwell | (Scotland) Dunfermline Athletic | |
| (Scotland) Bob McGrory | (England) Burnley | |
| (Republic of Ireland) Patrick O'Connell | (England) Ashington | |
| (Scotland) John McMillan | (Scotland) Renton | |
| (Scotland) Patrick O'Connell | (England) Ashington | |
| (Scotland) John Rowan | (Scotland) Hamilton | |
| (Scotland) Finlay Speedie | (Scotland) Dumbarton Harp | |
