= 1919–20 Dumbarton F.C. season =

Dumbarton
1919–1920 season
- Manager: George Livingstone
- Stadium: Boghead Park, Dumbarton
- League: 11th
- Scottish Cup: First Round
- Top goalscorer: League: Duncan Walker (20); All: Duncan Walker (20)
- Highest home attendance: 12,000
- Lowest home attendance: 2,000
- Average home league attendance: 4,025
Home colours

The 1919–20 season was the 43rd Scottish football season in which Dumbarton competed at national level, entering the Scottish Football League and the Scottish Cup. In addition Dumbarton entered the Dumbartonshire Cup and the Dumbartonshire Charity Cup.

== Scottish League ==
There was an improvement from the previous season with an 11th-place finish out of 22, with 39 points, 32 behind champions Rangers.

16 August 1919 League	Dumbarton	1–1	Ayr United	Boghead Park
	Martin 88'		McLaughlin 85'	Attendance: 3,000; Referee: J Stevenson

18 August 1919 League	Celtic	3–1	Dumbarton	Celtic Park
	McInally 42', 78'; McMenemy 89'		Rowan	Attendance: 6,000; Referee: A Allan

23 August 1919 League	Queen's Park	2–1	Dumbarton	Hampden Park
	Duffus 35' (o.g.); Kinloch 50'		Thom 30'	Attendance: 6,000; Referee: W Johnstone

30 August 1919 League	Dumbarton	1–0	Clydebank	Boghead Park
	Duffus, J 78'			Attendance: 8,000; Referee: J Sinclair

1 September 1919 League	Dumbarton	2–2	Kilmarnock	Boghead Park
	McDiarmid 15'		Clark 48'; Higgins	Attendance: 2,000; Referee: C Roche

6 September 1919 League	Dumbarton	0–0	Third Lanark	Boghead Park
				Attendance: 4,000; Referee: W Bell

10 September 1919 League	Dumbarton	1–1	Airdrie	Boghead Park
	Gordon 35'		Miller 15'	Attendance: 3,000

13 September 1919 League	Kilmarnock	3–1	Dumbarton	Rugby Park
	McHallum 30', 70'; Clark		Gordon	Attendance: 5,000; Referee: H Dickie

20 September 1919 League	Rangers	4–0	Dumbarton	Ibrox Park
	Gordon 5' 43'; Muirhead 65'			Attendance: 10,000; Referee: B Humphreys

27 September 1919 League	Dumbarton	4–1	Hamilton	Boghead Park
	Black 6'; Thom 55'; McDiarmid (pen.), 85'		Thornley	Attendance: 3,500; Referee: H Lorimer

4 October 1919 League	Hibernian	3–3	Dumbarton	Easter Road Stadium
	Williamson; Stage; Wood (pen.)		Bennett; McDiarmid (pen.)	Attendance: 9,000; Referee: J Grant

11 October 1919 League	Dumbarton	0–3	Dundee	Boghead Park
			Brown; McLaughlin	Attendance: 4,000; Referee: A Allan

18 October 1919 League	Morton	4–0	Dumbarton	Cappielow Park
	French 10', 80'; Brown 52'; Stevenson 75'			Attendance: 8,000; Referee: A McBeth

25 October 1919 League	Dumbarton	1–1	Raith Rovers	Boghead Park
	McDiarmid		Anderson	Attendance: 4,000; Referee: J Muir

1 November 1919 League	Clyde	1–2	Dumbarton	Shawfield Stadium
	Quinn		Bennett 25'; Duncan	Attendance: 3,000; Referee: G Hamilton

8 November 1919 League	Motherwell	1–1	Dumbarton	Fir Park
	Robertson 11'		Walker 7'	Attendance: 8,000; Referee: A Jackson

15 November 1919 League	Dumbarton	1–1; VOID	Partick Thistle	Boghead Park
	Walker		Comrie 20'	Attendance: 2,000; Referee: J Robertson

22 November 1919 League	Airdrie	1–1	Dumbarton	Broomfield Park
	Reid, J 61'		McDiarmid 60'	Attendance: 5,000; Referee: W Johnstone

29 November 1919 League	Dumbarton	2–0	Hearts	Boghead Park
	Walker 80'; Thom 82'			Attendance: 3,000; Referee: A Edward

6 December 1919 League	Dumbarton	2–1	Albion Rovers	Boghead Park
	Walker 55'		Melville 90'	Attendance: 4,000; Referee: H Lorimer

13 December 1919 League	St Mirren	1–5	Dumbarton	Love Street (stadium)
	Thomson		Thom; Walker 40'	Attendance: 5,000; Referee: J Stevenson

20 December 1919 League	Dumbarton	0–0	Celtic	Boghead Park
				Attendance: 12,000; Referee: T McMillan

27 December 1919 League	Falkirk	3–2	Dumbarton	Brockville Park
	Main; Hickie 52'; Rennie		Walker 10'	Attendance: 6,000

31 December 1919 League	Clydebank	1–1	Dumbarton	Clydeholm Park
	Fulton 11'		Walker 10'	Attendance: 10,000; Referee: W Bell

1 January 1920 League	Ayr United	2–1	Dumbarton	Somerset Park
	Agnew 7'; Smith		Walker 47'	Attendance: 7,000; Referee: A Edward

10 January 1920 League	Dumbarton	4–0	Aberdeen	Boghead Park
	Walker 5', 20', 75'; McDiarmid 30'			Attendance: 3,000; Referee: J Grant

17 January 1920 League	Third Lanark	1–0	Dumbarton	Cathkin Park
	Orr 75' (pen.)			Attendance: 8,000; Referee: J Lewis

31 January 1920 League	Dumbarton	2–3	Motherwell	Boghead Park
	Bennett 60', 68'		Ferrier 4', 26'; Ferguson 29'	Attendance: 3,000; Referee: A Allan

7 February 1920 League	Albion Rovers	1–2	Dumbarton	Cliftonhill Stadium
	White		Bennett mcDiarmid	Attendance: 6,000; Referee: J B Stevenson

14 February 1920 League	Dumbarton	2–0	Hibernian	Boghead Park
	McDiarmid 44', 80'			Attendance: 3,000; Referee: A Edward

21 February 1920 League	Dumbarton	1–0	Clyde	Boghead Park
	Duncan 25'			Attendance: 3,000; Referee: J Bennie

28 February 1920 League	Dumbarton	1–5	Queen's Park	Boghead Park
	McDiarmid 51'		Fyfe 47' 82'; Bell; McKenzie	Attendance: 5,000; Referee: J Muir

6 March 1920 League	Raith Rovers	2–0	Dumbarton	Starks Park
	Rattray; Anderson			Attendance: 8,000; Referee: H Humphreys

13 March 1920 League	Dumbarton	1–3	St Mirren	Boghead Park
	McDiarmid 52'		Grainger 7'; Buchanan	Attendance: 3,000; Referee: A Allan

20 March 1920 League	Dundee	3–1	Dumbarton	Dens Park
	Bell; Cowan; Rawlings		Walker	Attendance: 10,000; Referee: A Johnstone

27 March 1920 League	Hamilton	1–3	Dumbarton	Douglas Park
	Little (pen.)		Duffus, J Scott; McDiarmid	Attendance: 4,000; Referee: J Howden

3 April 1920 League	Dumbarton	0–0	Falkirk	Boghead Park
				Attendance: 3,000; Referee: J Dickson

10 April 1920 League	Partick Thistle	1–0	Dumbarton	Firhill Park
	Bowie 80'			Attendance: 6,000; Referee: C Rocks

12 April 1920 League	Dumbarton	0–1	Morton	Boghead Park
			French	Attendance: 2,000

17 April 1920 League	Hearts	1–2	Dumbarton	Tynecastle Stadium
	Sinclair 86'		Walker 2'; McDiarmid 80'	Attendance: 14,000; Referee: W Campbell

24 April 1920 League	Aberdeen	3–4	Dumbarton	Pittodrie Stadium
	Connon 6'; Wylie 10'; McLauchlin		McDiarmid 30'Gordon 31' Walker	Attendance: 12,000; Referee: H Lorimer

28 April 1920 League	Dumbarton	0–0	Rangers	Boghead Park
				Attendance: 6,000

1 May 1920 League	Dumbarton	1–1	Partick Thistle	Boghead Park
	Walker 2'		Lauder	Attendance: 3,000; Referee: T Dougray

== Scottish Cup ==
With the resumption of the Scottish Cup, Dumbarton were perhaps unfortunate to come up against Rangers in the first round. However they gave a good account of themselves, and lost a very close encounter by the only goal, after a 0–0 draw.

24 January 1920 Cup R1	Rangers	0–0	Dumbarton	Ibrox Park
				Attendance: 28,000; Referee: J Barclay

27 January 1920 Cup R1r	Rangers	1–0	Dumbarton	Ibrox Park
	Cairns 8'			Attendance: 28,000; Referee: W Bell

== Dumbartonshire Cup ==
For the second successive season Dumbarton failed to progress from the sectional stage of the Dumbartonshire Cup.

7 April 1919 Group	Dumbarton	3–0	Dumbarton Harp	Boghead Park
	Goal

14 April 1920 Group	Renton	3–2	Dumbarton	Tontine Park
	Haddow; Murray; Brown		Duffus; Duncan	Attendance: 3,000

21 April 1920 Group	Vale of Leven	2–1	Dumbarton	Millburn Park
	Donald		McDiarmid	Attendance: 3,000

3 May 1920 Group	Clydebank	3–2	Dumbarton	Clydeholm Park
	57'; Walker; McLavin 87'		McDiarmid 30'; Duffus 82'	Referee: J Martin

=== Final league table ===
Pos	Team	Pld	W	D	L	GF	GA	GD	Pts
1	Renton	4	3	1	0	10	5	+5	7
2	Clydebank	4	3	0	1	10	5	+5	6
3	Vale of Leven	4	2	1	1	7	6	+1	5
4	Dumbarton	4	1	0	3	8	8	0	2
5	Dumbarton Harp	4	0	0	4	1	12	−11	0

== Dumbartonshire Charity Cup ==
Dumbarton won the Dumbartonshire Charity Cup by defeating Vale of Leven in the final.

12 May 1920 First Round	Dumbarton	3–0	Dumbarton Harp	Boghead Park
	Gordon; Duffus

15 May 1920 Semi Final	Renton	1–3	Dumbarton	Millburn Park
	Ritchie		McDiarmid; Horsburgh; Thom	Attendance: 3,000

22 May 1920 Final	Dumbarton	3–1	Vale of Leven	Boghead Park
	Horsburgh 25'; Thom		Johnston 30'	Attendance: 3,000

== Player statistics ==
No.	Pos	Nat	Player	Total		First Division		Scottish Cup	
No.	Pos	Nat	Player	Apps	Goals	Apps	Goals	Apps	Goals
	GK	(Scotland) SCO	John Hagen	2	0	2	0	0	0
	GK	(Scotland) SCO	John Miller	42	0	40	0	2	0
	DF	(Scotland) SCO	Alex Marshall	6	0	6	0	0	0
	DF	(Scotland) SCO	Bob McGrory	40	0	38	0	2	0
	DF	(Scotland) SCO	Finlay Speedie	1	0	1	0	0	0
	DF	(England) ENG	Joseph Till	41	0	39	0	2	0
	MF	(Scotland) SCO	Robert Duffus	36	2	34	2	2	0
	MF	(Scotland) SCO	James Martin	15	1	15	1	0	0
	MF	(Scotland) SCO	James McDonald	5	0	5	0	0	0
	MF	(Ireland) EIR	Patrick O'Connell	33	0	31	0	2	0
	MF	(Scotland) SCO	Thomas Raeside	11	0	11	0	0	0
	MF	(Scotland) SCO	James Scott	31	1	29	1	2	0
	FW	(Scotland) SCO	Alex Bennett	39	6	37	6	2	0
	FW	(Scotland) SCO	John Black	15	1	15	1	0	0
	FW	(Scotland) SCO	John Clark	1	0	1	0	0	0
	FW	(Scotland) SCO	John Duffus	6	0	5	0	1	0
	FW	(Scotland) SCO	Scott Duncan	29	2	27	2	2	0
	FW	(Scotland) SCO	Charles Gordon	24	3	24	3	0	0
	FW	(Scotland) SCO	Bob McDermid	43	17	41	17	2	0
	FW	(Scotland) SCO	John Robertson	1	0	0	0	1	0
	FW	(Scotland) SCO	John Rowan	5	1	5	1	0	0
	FW	(Scotland) SCO	Alexander Thom	30	4	28	4	2	0
	FW	(Scotland) SCO	Duncan Walker	26	19	26	19	0	0
	FW	(Scotland) SCO	Joseph Willis	2	0	2	0	0	0

=== Transfers ===
==== Players in ====
Player	From	Date
(Scotland) James McDonald		1 May 1919
(Scotland) James Scott	(England) Liverpool	30 May 1919
(Scotland) Robert Duffus	(Scotland) Dundee	31 May 1919
(Scotland) John Black	(Scotland) Dumbarton Harp	10 Jun 1919
(Scotland) James Martin	(Scotland) Rangers	5 Jul 1919
(Scotland) Scott Duncan	(Scotland) Rangers	15 Jul 1919
(Republic of Ireland) Patrick O'Connell	(England) Manchester United	7 Aug 1919
(England) Joseph Till	(England) Wellington Town	19 Aug 1919
(Scotland) Charles Gordon	(Scotland) Queen's Park	20 Aug 1919
(Scotland) John Hagan	(Scotland) Dumbarton Harp	20 Sep 1919
(Scotland) John Duffus	(Scotland) Bo'ness	21 Sep 1919
(Scotland) John Robertson	(Scotland) Motherwell (loan)	1 Jan 1920
(Scotland) Joseph Willis	(Scotland) Bo'ness (loan)	11 Mar 1920
(Scotland) John Clark	(Scotland) (loan)	10 Apr 1920

==== Players out ====
Player	To	Date
(Scotland) Archibald Ritchie	(Scotland) Rangers	20 May 1919
(Scotland) John Rowan	(Scotland) Hamilton	20 Oct 1919
(Scotland) Alex Marshall	(Scotland) Dumbarton Harp (loan)	12 Dec 1919
(Scotland) Thomas Raeside	(Scotland) Bo'ness (loan)	2 Jan 1920
(Scotland) John Black	(Scotland) Albion Rovers	28 Jan 1920
(Scotland) Hugh Burns	(Scotland) Renton	
(Scotland) James Cumming	(England) West Ham	
(Scotland) James Dawson	(Scotland) St Bernards	
(Scotland) John Durnin	(Wales) Swansea Town	
(Scotland) Joseph Hendry	(Scotland) Third Lanark	
(Scotland) John McKim	(Scotland) Hamilton	
(Scotland) William Ritchie	(England) Bury	
(Scotland) Duncan Walker	(Scotland) Bo'ness (loan)	
(Scotland) Herbert Yarnell	(England) Reading	

In addition Robert Carmichael, David Finnie, Val Lawrence, John McEwan, James McGregor, James McIntosh, James Neil, william Wilson and James Young all played their final 'first XI' games in Dumbarton colours.

=== Representative Match ===
Robert McGrory and James Scott were selected to play in the Home Scots team which played an Anglo Scot select on 30 March 1920. The Home Scots won 2-1.
