= 1921–22 Dumbarton F.C. season =

Dumbarton
1921–1922 season
- Manager: Paddy Travers
- Stadium: Boghead Park, Dumbarton
- Scottish League Division One: 20th
- Scottish Cup: First Round
- Top goalscorer: League: Jock Wood (25); All: Jock Wood (25)
- Highest home attendance: 10,000
- Lowest home attendance: 2,000
- Average home league attendance: 4,200
Home colours

The 1921–22 season was the 45th Scottish football season in which Dumbarton competed at national level, entering the Scottish Football League and the Scottish Cup. In addition Dumbarton entered the Dumbartonshire Cup and the Dumbartonshire Charity Cup.

== Scottish League ==
Dumbarton's league performance showed a slight improvement on the previous season by finishing 20th out of 22 with 30 points, some way behind champions Celtic.

20 August 1921 League	Kilmarnock	1–0	Dumbarton	Rugby Park
	Culley 3'			Attendance: 10,000; Referee: H Dickie

27 August 1921 League	Dumbarton	1–1	Aberdeen	Boghead Park
	Alexander 25'		Miller 30'	Attendance: 5,000; Referee: J Sinclair

31 August 1921 League	Dumbarton	1–2	Hamilton	Boghead Park
	Wood 53'		McMillan; Cullan 15'	Attendance: 3,000; Referee: J Howden

3 September 1921 League	Partick Thistle	4–2	Dumbarton	Firhill Park
	Blair 85'; Johnston; Kinloch		Chalmers 25'; Wood 50'	Attendance: 15,000; Referee: H Humphrey

6 September 1921 League	Celtic	4–0	Dumbarton	Celtic Park
	McNally 1', 75'; Gallagher 44'; Cassidy 80'			Attendance: 10,000; Referee: T Dougray

10 September 1921 League	Dumbarton	3–3	Third Lanark	Boghead Park
	McEwan; Wood; Chalmers		Walker, F McAndrew; Hillhouse	Attendance: 4,000; Referee: T McMillan

17 September 1921 League	Dumbarton	2–0	Clydebank	Boghead Park
	Wood 40'			Attendance: 6,000; Referee: J Lyons

24 September 1921 League	Dumbarton	0–5	Celtic	Boghead Park
			McNally 35'; McLean; Gallagher	Attendance: 10,000; Referee: A McMahon

1 October 1921 League	Dumbarton	2–3	Queen's Park	Boghead Park
	Wood 10' (pen.)		Fyfe	Attendance: 4,000; Referee: J Sinclair

4 October 1921 League	Third Lanark	1–1	Dumbarton	Cathkin Park
	Allan		Taylor	Attendance: 1,000; Referee: J Jackson

8 October 1921 League	Dumbarton	1–0	Airdrie	Boghead Park
	Wood 14'			Attendance: 3,000; Referee: A Allan

15 October 1921 League	Motherwell	5–0	Dumbarton	Fir Park
	Lennie; Ferguson 14' 83'; Reid			Attendance: 9,000; Referee: H Dickie

22 October 1921 League	Dumbarton	2–1	Morton	Boghead Park
	Browning; Wood		French	Attendance: 3,000; Referee: A Allan

29 October 1921 League	Hearts	2–0	Dumbarton	Tynecastle Stadium
	Miller, T 3'; Wilson 85'			Attendance: 15,500; Referee: J Bell

5 November 1921 League	Dumbarton	1–2	Raith Rovers	Boghead Park
	Wood (pen.)		Bauld 30'; Jennings	Attendance: 3,500; Referee: J Muir

12 November 1921 League	Rangers	1–1	Dumbarton	Ibrox Park
	Cairns 35'		Wood 65'	Attendance: 16,000; Referee: J Howden

19 November 1921 League	Dumbarton	4–1	Clyde	Boghead Park
	Wood 50'; Chalmers; Robertson, J		Rae 65'	Attendance: 4,000; Referee: A McMahon

26 November 1921 League	Hibernian	0–0	Dumbarton	Easter Road Stadium
				Attendance: 12,000; Referee: J Dickson

3 December 1921 League	St Mirren	4–2	Dumbarton	Love Street (stadium)
	Thomson 5'; Gillies; Walker 89'		Wood 10', 83' (pen.)	Attendance: 10,000; Referee: W Bell

10 December 1921 League	Dumbarton	0–0	Falkirk	Boghead Park
				Attendance: 3,000; Referee: W Bell

17 December 1921 League	Dumbarton	2–0	Dundee	Boghead Park
	Browning 10'; Wood 55' (pen.)			Attendance: 4,000; Referee: A Allan

24 December 1921 League	Albion Rovers	1–0	Dumbarton	Cliftonhill Stadium
	Young 5'			Attendance: 4,000

31 December 1921 League	Dumbarton	1–4	Partick Thistle	Boghead Park
	Wood (pen.)		McColl; Kinloch; Harris	Attendance: 5,000; Referee: H Dickie

2 January 1922 League	Ayr United	2–0	Dumbarton	Somerset Park
	Muir			Attendance: 5,000; Referee: W Campbell

3 January 1922 League	Hamilton	1–1	Dumbarton	Douglas Park
	Wall 60'		Wood	Attendance: 5,000; Referee: W Campbell

7 January 1922 League	Dumbarton	5–3	Kilmarnock	Boghead Park
	Wood; Alexander; Robertson, J		Culley 75'; Smith; Gray	Attendance: 5,000; Referee: J Binnie

14 January 1922 League	Aberdeen	3–0	Dumbarton	Pittodrie Stadium
	Miller 60'; Rankin			Attendance: 12,000; Referee: J Bell

4 February 1922 League	Airdrie	3–1	Dumbarton	Broomfield Park
	McDougall 70'; Howieson; Murdoch		Chalmers	Attendance: 4,000; Referee: H Humphrey

11 February 1922 League	Raith Rovers	1–1	Dumbarton	Starks Park
	Jennings 30'		Wood 25' (pen.)	Attendance: 6,000; Referee: H Dickie

13 February 1922 League	Dumbarton	3–1	Ayr United	Boghead Park
	Wood		Slade 50'	Attendance: 2,500; Referee: J Stevenson

18 February 1922 League	Dundee	2–0	Dumbarton	Dens Park
	Halliday 30'; Ross			Attendance: 15,000; Referee: W Bell

25 February 1922 League	Queen's Park	1–0	Dumbarton	Hampden Park
	Templeton 20'			Attendance: 12,000; Referee: J Binnie

27 February 1922 League	Dumbarton	0–2	St Mirren	Boghead Park
			Stevenson; Walker	Attendance: 2,000; Referee: J Martin

4 March 1922 League	Dumbarton	1–1	Hibernian	Boghead Park
	Halleron		Young 30'	Attendance: 4,000; Referee: W Campbell

18 March 1922 League	Morton	1–0	Dumbarton	Cappielow Park
	Brown 56'			Attendance: 6,000

25 March 1922 League	Dumbarton	1–2	Albion Rovers	Boghead Park
	Halleron		Walls 55'	Attendance: 3,000; Referee: J Bell

1 April 1922 League	Clyde	5–0	Dumbarton	Shawfield Stadium
	Duncan 48' 58' (pen.); Brown			Attendance: 4,000; Referee: J Martin

8 April 1922 League	Dumbarton	0–4	Rangers	Boghead Park
			Meiklejohn 70'; McCandless (pen.); Henderson; McDermid	Attendance: 7,000; Referee: J Martin

19 April 1922 League	Dumbarton	3–2	Motherwell	Boghead Park
	Henderson 40'; Wood (pen.); Thomson		Hart ferguson 20'	Attendance: 2,000; Referee: J Dickson

22 April 1922 League	Dumbarton	3–2	Hearts	Boghead Park
	Alexander 30'; Halleron 43'; Wood 60' (pen.)		Crossan 25' (pen.), 89' (pen.)	Attendance: 5,000; Referee: J Stevenson

26 April 1922 League	Clydebank	0–1	Dumbarton	Clydeholm Park
			Thomson 50'	Attendance: 2,000; Referee: J Stevenson

29 January 1922 League	Falkirk	0–0	Dumbarton	Brockville Park
				Attendance: 10,000; Referee: H Dickie

=== Promotion/Relegation ===
Unfortunately the re-forming of the Second Division coincided with the introduction of automatic promotion/relegation, and Dumbarton were relegated for the following season.

== Scottish Cup ==
In the Scottish Cup, Dumbarton were knocked out in the first round by Aberdeen.

28 January 1922 Cup R1	Aberdeen	1–0	Dumbarton	Pittodrie Park
	Thomson 41'			Attendance: 15,000; Referee: W Campbell

== Dumbartonshire Cup ==
Dumbarton won the Dumbartonshire Cup by topping the league and defeating Dumbarton Harp in the final after a replay.

5 January 1922 Group	Dumbarton	0–0	Dumbarton Harp	Boghead Park

1 April 1922 Group	Dumbarton	4–2	Helensburgh	Boghead Park
	Alexander; Robertson, J		Goal

3 April 1922 Group	Vale of Leven	0–1	Dumbarton	Millburn Park
			Wood 30'	Attendance: 2,000

5 April 1922 Group	Dumbarton	3–0	Clydebank	Boghead Park
	Gordon; Wood

21 April 1922 Group	Dumbarton	1–0	Renton	Boghead Park
	Coutts			Attendance: 2,000

28 April 1922 Final	Dumbarton	1–1	Dumbarton Harp	Boghead Park
	Sheddan		Goal

29 April 1922 Final replay	Dumbarton	2–0	Dumbarton Harp	Boghead Park
	Robertson; Coutts

=== League table ===
Pos	Team	Pld	W	D	L	GF	GA	GD	Pts
1	Dumbarton	5	4	1	0	9	2	+7	9
2	Dumbarton Harp	5	3	2	0	9	2	+7	8
3	Clydebank	5	2	0	3	8	8	0	4
4	Vale of Leven	3	1	0	2	2	2	0	2
5	Renton	3	0	1	2	1	7	−6	1
6	Helensburgh	3	0	0	3	3	11	−8	0

== Dumbartonshire Charity Cup ==
Dumbarton retained the Dumbartonshire Charity Cup by defeating Clydebank (on corners) in the final.

1 May 1922 First Round	Dumbarton	4–0	Vale of Leven	Boghead Park
	Alexander; Gordon; Wood			Attendance: 2,000

6 May 1922 Semi Final	Dumbarton	1–0	Renton	Boghead Park
	Alexander 55'			Referee: H Dickie

13 May 1922 Final	Dumbarton	1–1 (won on corners)	Clydebank	Boghead Park
	Alexander 22'		Frame 50'

== Friendlies ==
At the end of the season Dumbarton embarked on their first 'official' foreign tour, playing 11 matches in Norway and Sweden, winning 7, drawing 2 and losing 2, scoring 24 goals for the loss of 12. Two other friendlies were played against Vale of Leven and Leith Athletic.

17 August 1921 Benefit	Vale of Leven	0–0	Dumbarton	Millburn Park
				Attendance: 2,000

11 March 1922 Friendly	Dumbarton	4–2	Leith Athletic	Boghead Park
	Robertson, J Taylor; Wood		Drysdale; Meaney	Attendance: 2,000

May 1922 Friendly	(Norway) Viking FK	0–2	Dumbarton	Stavanger
			Goal

May 1922 Friendly	(Norway) Viking FK	1–7	Dumbarton	Stavanger
	Goal		Goal

16 May 1922 Friendly	(Norway) SK Brann	0–2	Dumbarton	Bergen
			Browning; Thomson	Attendance: 3,500

19 May 1922 Friendly	(Norway) SK Brann	3–4	Dumbarton	Bergen
	Browning; Thomson		Browning; Thomson	Attendance: 3,000

22 May 1922 Friendly	(Norway) Drammen	2–1	Dumbarton	Drammen
	Goal		Goal

May 1922 Friendly	(Norway) Frigg Oslo FK	0–0	Dumbarton	Oslo

25 May 1922 Friendly	(Sweden) Örgryte IS	1–2	Dumbarton	Gothenburg
	Goal		Goal

26 May 1922 Friendly	(Sweden) IFK Göteborg	0–1	Dumbarton	Gothenburg
			Goal

28 May 1922 Friendly	(Sweden) Gothenberg Select	4–0	Dumbarton	Gothenburg
	Goal

7 June 1922 Friendly	(Norway) SK Brann	0–4	Dumbarton	Bergen
			Goal

9 June 1922 Friendly	(Norway) SK Brann	1–1	Dumbarton	Bergen
	Goal		Goal

== Player statistics ==
No.	Pos	Nat	Player	Total		First Division		Scottish Cup	
No.	Pos	Nat	Player	Apps	Goals	Apps	Goals	Apps	Goals
	GK	(Scotland) SCO	Douglas Haggo	7	0	7	0	0	0
	GK	(Scotland) SCO	Arthur King	20	0	19	0	1	0
	GK	(Scotland) SCO	Joshua Wilkinson	16	0	16	0	0	0
	DF	(Scotland) SCO	William Aitken	1	0	1	0	0	0
	DF	(Scotland) SCO	Donald Colman	25	0	24	0	1	0
	DF	(Scotland) SCO	Alex Henderson	37	0	36	0	1	0
	DF	(Scotland) SCO	Hugh McBride	11	0	11	0	0	0
	DF	(Scotland) SCO	Robert Robertson	14	0	14	0	0	0
	MF	(Ireland) EIR	Harry Chatton	28	0	27	0	1	0
	MF	(Scotland) SCO	John Coutts	15	0	15	0	0	0
	MF	(England) ENG	Richard Field	8	0	8	0	0	0
	MF	(Scotland) SCO	James Forrest	1	0	1	0	0	0
	MF	(Scotland) SCO	Robert Godfrey	16	0	16	0	0	0
	MF	(Scotland) SCO	Henry Loney	41	0	40	0	1	0
	MF	(Scotland) SCO	Andrew Mair	5	0	5	0	0	0
	MF	(Scotland) SCO	James Taylor	8	1	7	1	1	0
	MF	(Scotland) SCO	Martin Travers	1	0	1	0	0	0
	FW	(Scotland) SCO	James Alexander	12	5	11	5	1	0
	FW	(Scotland) SCO	John Bowie	7	0	7	0	0	0
	FW	(Scotland) SCO	John Browning	40	2	39	2	1	0
	FW	(Scotland) SCO	Andrew Chalmers	28	4	27	4	1	0
	FW	(Scotland) SCO	Charles Gordon	6	0	6	0	0	0
	FW	(Scotland) SCO	John Granger	4	0	4	0	0	0
	FW	(Scotland) SCO	Peter Halleron	10	4	10	4	0	0
	FW	(Scotland) SCO	Robert McEwan	30	1	30	1	0	0
	FW	(Scotland) SCO	James Robertson	31	2	30	2	1	0
	FW	(Scotland) SCO	Alexander Shedden	1	0	1	0	0	0
	FW	(Scotland) SCO	Norman Thomson	7	2	7	2	0	0
	FW	(Scotland) SCO	Jock Wood	43	25	42	25	1	0

=== Transfers ===
==== Players in ====
Player	From	Date
(Scotland) John Coutts	(Scotland) Alloa Athletic	8 May 1921
(Scotland) John Granger	(Scotland) St Mirren	9 May 1921
(Scotland) Robert McEwan	(Scotland) Kilsyth Rangers	9 May 1921
(Scotland) Joshua Wilkinson	(Scotland) Renton	9 May 1921
(Scotland) Henry Loney	(Scotland) Alloa Athletic	10 May 1921
(Scotland) Alex Henderson	(Scotland) Falkirk	11 May 1921
(Scotland) James Robertson	(Scotland) Falkirk	14 May 1921
(England) Richard Field	(England) Sunderland	21 May 1921
(Scotland) Roberd Godfrey	(Scotland) Ayr United	11 Jun 1921
(Scotland) Robert Robertson	(Scotland) Hamilton	22 Jun 1921
(Scotland) Jock Wood	(Scotland) Hibernian	23 Jun 1921
(Scotland) James Taylor		30 Jun 1921
(Scotland) Douglas Haggo	(Scotland) Kirkintilloch Rob Roy	9 Aug 1921
(Scotland) Andrew Mair		18 Aug 1921
(Scotland) William Aitken	(Scotland) Yoker	3 Sep 1921
(Scotland) Hugh McBride	(England) Plymouth Argyle	5 Sep 1921
(Scotland) Peter Halleron		2 Dec 1921
(Scotland) Arthur King	(Scotland) Dunfermline Athletic	19 Dec 1921
(Scotland) Martin Travers	(Scotland) Bedlay Juniors	9 Jan 1922
(Scotland) Charles Gordon	(Scotland) Dumbarton Harp	19 Jan 1922
(Scotland) Alexander Shedden	(Scotland) Bridge of Weir	20 Feb 1922
(Scotland) James Forrest	(Scotland) Royal Albert	3 Mar 1922
(Scotland) John Bowie	(Scotland) Partick Thistle (loan)	15 Mar 1922
(Scotland) Norman Thomson	(Scotland) St Anthonys	23 Mar 1922
(Scotland) James Alexander	(Scotland) Queen's Park	

==== Players out ====
Player	To	Date
(Scotland) Bob McDermid	(Scotland) Rangers	1 May 1921
(Scotland) Scott Duncan	(Scotland) Cowdenbeath (loan)	14 Jun 1921
(Scotland) John Miller	(Scotland) Bo'ness	15 Aug 1921
(Scotland) John Granger	(Scotland) Vale of Leven	3 Sep 1921
(Scotland) Thomas Raeside	(Scotland) King's Park	7 Sep 1921
(Scotland) Arthur Early	(Scotland) Nithsdale Wanderers	
(Scotland) Thomas Mannion	(Scotland) King's Park	
(Scotland) John McMillan	(Scotland) Vale of Leven	
(Scotland) John McTavish	(Scotland) East Stirling	
(England) Joseph Till	(Scotland) St Mirren	
(Scotland) Percy Wharrier	(Scotland) Helensburgh	
(Scotland) Scott Duncan	(Scotland) Cowdenbeath (loan)	

In addition William Aitken, Alex Marshall, James McDonald and George Rae all played their final 'first XI' games in Dumbarton colours.

== Reserve Team ==
Dumbarton Reserves played in the Scottish Alliance League and also in the Scottish Second XI Cup.
