= 1918–19 Dumbarton F.C. season =

Dumbarton
1918–1919 season
- Manager: James Collins
- Stadium: Boghead Park, Dumbarton
- Scottish League: 15th
- Top goalscorer: League: Herbert Yarnell (5); All: Herbert Yarnell (5)
- Highest home attendance: 10,000
- Lowest home attendance: 2,000
- Average home league attendance: 3,600
Home colours

The 1918–19 season was the 42nd Scottish football season in which Dumbarton competed at national level, entering the Scottish Football League and the Victory Cup, marking the end of the Great War. In addition Dumbarton entered the Dumbartonshire Cup, the Dumbartonshire Charity Cup and the Clydebank Charity Cup.

== Scottish League ==
This was the fifth (and last) season of war-time football, where the playing of all national competitions, other than the Scottish League, was suspended. Membership of the League was increased from 18 to 22, with the re-admission of Aberdeen, Dundee and Raith Rovers, together with the addition of Albion Rovers.

Dumbarton finished 15th out of 18, in the League with 22 points, well behind champions Celtic. This was their worst performance in a number of years, perhaps not unsurprising given the large turnover in playing staff. Most concerning during the season was the inability to score goals, as in 17 of the 34 league matches, Dumbarton failed to 'find the net'.

17 August 1918 League	Clyde	4–1	Dumbarton	Shawfield Stadium
	Watson; Heard		Yarnell	Attendance: 6,000

24 August 1918 League	Dumbarton	2–0	Motherwell	Boghead Park
	Yarnell 25'; Murphy			Attendance: 3,000; Referee: T Dougray

31 August 1918 League	Morton	3–1	Dumbarton	Cappielow Park
	Robertson 24'; Broad 40'		Yarnell 20'	Attendance: 6,000

14 September 1918 League	Clydebank	3–1	Dumbarton	Clydeholm Park
	Goldie 2' Travers		Yarnell	Attendance: 8,000

21 September 1918 League	Dumbarton	1–2	Hearts	Boghead Park
	Murphy 47'		Sinclair	Attendance: 2,000; Referee: J Howden

28 September 1918 League	Kilmarnock	0–0	Dumbarton	Rugby Park
				Attendance: 3,000

5 October 1918 League	Dumbarton	0–0	Queen's Park	Boghead Park
				Attendance: 2,000

12 October 1918 League	Rangers	3–0	Dumbarton	Ibrox Park
	McLean 45'; Aitken 65'			Attendance: 12,000

19 October 1918 League	Airdrie	1–1	Dumbarton	Broomfield Park
	Bennett 48'		Yarnell 50'	Attendance: 2,000

26 October 1918 League	Dumbarton	0–5	Celtic	Boghead Park
			Cringan 20'; Burns 25'; McLean	Attendance: 6,000

2 November 1918 League	Dumbarton	1–2	Falkirk	Boghead Park
	Durnin		Martin 13'; McCulloch	Attendance: 2,000

9 November 1918 League	Dumbarton	1–2	Hamilton	Boghead Park
	McGregor 30'		Thomson; Kelly	Attendance: 2,500

23 November 1918 League	Dumbarton	4–0	Hibernian	Boghead Park
	Carmichael; Yarnell; Bell			Attendance: 1,500

7 December 1918 League	Dumbarton	0–0	Ayr United	Boghead Park
				Attendance: 2,000

14 December 1918 League	Celtic	2–0	Dumbarton	Celtic Park
	McColl 38'; McMenemy 42'			Attendance: 6,000

21 December 1918 League	Dumbarton	1–1	Partick Thistle	Boghead Park
	Thom 30'		Henderson 40'	Attendance: 2,000

28 December 1918 League	Ayr United	5–0	Dumbarton	Somerset Park
	Richardson 5'; McLachlan (pen.)			Attendance: 4,000

31 December 1918 League	Dumbarton	1–1	Clydebank	Boghead Park
	Rowan		Goal	Attendance: 6,000

4 January 1919 League	Falkirk	5–1	Dumbarton	Brockville Park
	Puddefoot 45'; McCallum; Martin; Thomson		McDiarmid 30'	Attendance: 4,000

11 January 1919 League	Dumbarton	0–0	St Mirren	Boghead Park
				Attendance: 6,000

18 January 1919 League	Dumbarton	0–1	Morton	Boghead Park
			McNab 20'	Attendance: 5,000

25 January 1919 League	Partick Thistle	1–3	Dumbarton	Firhill Park
	Bowie		McDairmid 20', 30'	Attendance: 15,000; Referee: H Humphreys

1 February 1919 League	Dumbarton	0–2	Rangers	Boghead Park
			Cairns 35'; Cunningham 55'	Attendance: 10,000; Referee: T Robertson

8 February 1919 League	Hibernian	1–0	Dumbarton	Easter Road Stadium
	Williams 83'			Attendance: 8,000

15 February 1919 League	Dumbarton	0–0	Airdrie	Boghead Park
				Attendance: 4,000

22 February 1919 League	Dumbarton	1–0	Clyde	Boghead Park
	Bates 83'			Attendance: 3,000

8 March 1919 League	Dumbarton	0–1	Kilmarnock	Boghead Park
			Culley 65'	Attendance: 3,000

22 March 1919 League	St Mirren	2–0	Dumbarton	Love Street (stadium)
	Clark 56', 61'			Attendance: 7,000; Referee: Mr Stevenson

29 March 1919 League	Hamilton	0–3	Dumbarton	Douglas Park
			Thom; Bennett; Ritchie, W	Attendance: 4,000

5 April 1919 League	Dumbarton	4–3	Third Lanark	Boghead Park
	Bennett 12'; Rowan 25', 50', 55'		Paterson 15'; Allan 45'; McConnachie 47'	Attendance: 3,000

12 April 1919 League	Third Lanark	2–4	Dumbarton	Cathkin Park
	Allan 8'; Bennie		Ritchie, W 15'; Hendry 48'; Thom	Attendance: 8,000

19 April 1919 League	Queen's Park	1–0	Dumbarton	Hampden Park
	Bell 80'			Attendance: 12,000

26 April 1919 League	Motherwell	3–0	Dumbarton	Fir Park
	Robertson 20', 55'; Gardiner			Attendance: 6,000; Referee: M Dickie

3 May 1919 League	Hearts	2–0	Dumbarton	Tynecastle Stadium
	Wilson 10'; Miller, G 65'			Attendance: 10,500; Referee: A Edwards

== Victory Cup ==
To mark the end of the Great War, a Victory Cup was played for - but Dumbarton were beaten in the first round by the eventual winners, St Mirren, after a 0–0 draw.

1 March 1919 First Round	St Mirren	0–0	Dumbarton	Love Street (stadium)
				Attendance: 9,000

5 March 1919 First Round Replay	Dumbarton	0–1	St Mirren	Boghead Park
			Duncan 55'	Attendance: 6,000

== Dumbartonshire Cup ==
The Dumbartonshire Cup returned to a 'round robin' qualifying process, but by winning only one tie, failed to qualify for the final.

2 January 1919 Group	Dumbarton	2–1	Renton	Boghead Park
	Thom; Reid		Goal	Attendance: 1,000

15 March 1919 Group	Dumbarton Harp	2–0	Dumbarton	Meadow Park, Dumbarton
	Anderson 52'			Attendance: 5,000

12 April 1919 Group	Clydebank	1–0	Dumbarton	Clydeholm Park
	Riddell 55' (o.g.)			Attendance: 5,000

30 April 1919 Group	Vale of Leven	4–2	Dumbarton	Millburn Park
	Lawson 60'; Gray; Burns; Moir		Riddell 62'; Bennett	Attendance: 3,000

=== Final league table ===
Pos	Team	Pld	W	D	L	GF	GA	GD	Pts
1	Dumbarton Harp	4	3	1	0	8	3	+5	7
2	Clydebank	4	2	1	1	5	4	+1	5
3	Vale of Leven	4	1	1	2	7	8	−1	3
4	Renton	4	1	1	2	6	7	−1	3
5	Dumbarton	4	1	0	3	4	8	−4	2

== Dumbartonshire Charity Cup ==
Dumabrton lost out in the final of the Dumbartonshire Charity Cup to Dumbarton Harp.

17 May 1919 Semi Final	Dumbarton	1–0	Vale of Leven	Boghead Park
	Riddell 82'			Attendance: 6,000

24 May 1919 Final	Dumbarton Harp	2–0	Dumbarton	Meadow Park, Dumbarton
	Black, J			Attendance: 5,000

== Clydebank Charity Cup ==
Dumbarton lost out in the final of the inaugural Clydebank Charity Cup to hosts Clydebank.

31 May 1919 Final	Clydebank	1–0	Dumbarton	Clydeholm Park
	McLaughlin 65'			Attendance: 4,000

== Player statistics ==
=== Squad ===
No.	Pos	Nat	Player	Total		Scottish League		Victory Cup	
No.	Pos	Nat	Player	Apps	Goals	Apps	Goals	Apps	Goals
	GK	(Scotland) SCO	John Eadon	2	0	1	0	1	0
	GK	(Scotland) SCO	Hart	1	0	1	0	0	0
	GK	(Scotland) SCO	Roger Henderson	1	0	1	0	0	0
	GK	(Scotland) SCO	John Miller	32	0	31	0	1	0
	DF	(Scotland) SCO	Tommy Kelso	2	0	2	0	0	0
	DF	(Scotland) SCO	Duggie Livingstone	1	0	1	0	0	0
	DF	(Scotland) SCO	Alex Marshall	10	0	10	0	0	0
	DF	(Scotland) SCO	Bob McGrory	36	0	34	0	2	0
	DF	(Scotland) SCO	Archibald McLachlan	12	0	12	0	0	0
	DF	(Scotland) SCO	Patrick	1	0	1	0	0	0
	DF	(Scotland) SCO	Archibald Ritchie	1	0	1	0	0	0
	MF	(Scotland) SCO	Hugh Burns	9	0	9	0	0	0
	MF	(Scotland) SCO	John Durnin	23	1	21	1	2	0
	MF	(Scotland) SCO	Joe Hendry	25	2	23	2	2	0
	MF	(Scotland) SCO	Val Lawrence	11	0	11	0	0	0
	MF	(Scotland) SCO	James McGregor	20	1	18	1	2	0
	MF	(Scotland) SCO	James McIntosh	5	0	5	0	0	0
	MF	(Scotland) SCO	James Riddell	13	0	11	0	2	0
	MF	(Scotland) SCO	William Wilson	7	0	7	0	0	0
	FW	(Scotland) SCO	Bobby Archibald	6	0	4	0	2	0
	FW	(Scotland) SCO	Walter Bate	2	1	1	1	1	0
	FW	(Scotland) SCO	Richard Bell	6	2	6	2	0	0
	FW	(Scotland) SCO	Alex Bennett	6	2	6	2	0	0
	FW	(Scotland) SCO	Robert Carmichael	6	2	6	2	0	0
	FW	(Scotland) SCO	James Cumming	2	0	2	0	0	0
	FW	(Scotland) SCO	James Dawson	7	0	6	0	1	0
	FW	(Scotland) SCO	Scott Duncan	1	0	1	0	0	0
	FW	(Scotland) SCO	David Finnie	7	0	7	0	0	0
	FW	(Scotland) SCO	Bob McDermid	18	4	16	4	2	0
	FW	(Scotland) SCO	John McDowell	1	0	1	0	0	0
	FW	(Scotland) SCO	John McEwan	10	0	10	0	0	0
	FW	(Scotland) SCO	John McKim	7	0	7	0	0	0
	FW	(Scotland) SCO	William Mitchell	7	0	5	0	2	0
	FW	(Scotland) SCO	Hugh Murphy	8	2	8	2	0	0
	FW	(Scotland) SCO	James Neil	3	0	3	0	0	0
	FW	(Scotland) SCO	Rowland Ogden	2	0	2	0	0	0
	FW	(Scotland) SCO	Jack Rattray	1	0	1	0	0	0
	FW	(Scotland) SCO	James Reid	1	0	1	0	0	0
	FW	(Scotland) SCO	William Ritchie	25	2	23	2	2	0
	FW	(Scotland) SCO	John Rowan	6	4	6	4	0	0
	FW	(Scotland) SCO	Alexander Thom	29	3	29	3	0	0
	FW	(Scotland) SCO	Duncan Walker	4	0	4	0	0	0
	FW	(Scotland) SCO	Herbert Yarnall	14	5	14	5	0	0
	FW	(Scotland) SCO	James Young	5	0	5	0	0	0

=== Transfers ===
==== Players in ====
Player	From	Date
(Scotland) David Finnie	(Scotland) Clyde	31 July 1918
(Scotland) James Neill	(Scotland) Old Kilpartick	31 July 1918
(Scotland) Herbert Yarnell	(Scotland) Clydebank	1 Aug 1918
(Scotland) Hugh Burns	(Scotland) Renton	13 Aug 1918
(Scotland) Hugh Murphy	(Scotland) Falkirk (loan)	13 Aug 1918
(Scotland) John McEwan	(Scotland) Hearts	19 Aug 1918
(Scotland) Archie McLachlan	(Scotland) Partick Thistle	23 Aug 1918
(Scotland) Joe Hendry	(Scotland) Rangers (loan)	31 Aug 1918
(Scotland) Duggie Livingstone	(Scotland) Celtic (loan)	1 Oct 1918
(Scotland) Val Lawrence	(Scotland) Morton	30 Oct 1918
(Scotland) Roger Henderson	(Scotland) Renton (loan)	1 Nov 1918
(Scotland) Robdert Carmichael	(Scotland) Clyde	7 Nov 1918
(Scotland) Thomas Kelso	(Scotland) Rangers (loan)	7 Nov 1918
(Scotland) Richard Bell	(Scotland) Rangers (loan)	29 Nov 1918
(Scotland) James Reid	(Scotland) Queen's Park (loan)	2 Jan 1919
(Scotland) Bob McDermid	(Scotland) Rangers	10 Jan 1919
(Scotland) Jack Rattray	(Scotland) Falkirk (loan)	17 Jan 1919
(Scotland) James Dawson	(Scotland) Hearts	18 Jan 1918
(Scotland) James Young	(Scotland) Rangers	18 Jan 1919
(Scotland) James Riddell	(Scotland) Kilmarnock (loan)	23 Jan 1919
(Scotland) Bobby Archibald	(Scotland) Aberdeen (loan)	24 Jan 1919
(Scotland) Michael Mitchell	(Scotland) Celtic (loan)	24 Jan 1919
(Scotland) Ogden Rowland	(England) Blackburn Rovers	31 Jan 1919
(Scotland) James Cumming	(England) Manchester City	14 Feb 1919
(Scotland) Walter Bate	(England) Royal Worcesters (loan)	21 Feb 1919
(Scotland) John Eadon	(England) Tottenham Hotspur (loan)	4 Mar 1919
(Scotland) John McDowell	(Scotland) Vale of Leven (loan)	7 Mar 1919
(Scotland) Duncan Walker	(Scotland) Kilsyth Rangers	10 Mar 1919
(Scotland) Alex Bennett	(Scotland) Rangers	11 Mar 1919
(Scotland) James McIntosh	(England) Hull City	14 Mar 1919
(Scotland) Bob Duffus	(Scotland) Dundee (loan)	23 May 1919
(Scotland) Scott Duncan	(Scotland) Rangers (loan)	30 May 1919

==== Players out ====
Player	To	Date
(Scotland) William Gallacher	(Scotland) Renton	
(Scotland) Felix Gunn	(Scotland) Dumbarton Harp	
(Scotland) James Stewart	(Scotland) Hamilton	
(Scotland) Alex Trotter	(Scotland) Renton	
(Scotland) James McGregor	(Scotland) Kilmarnock (loan)	
(Scotland) Alexander Thom	(Scotland) Ayr United (loan)	
(Scotland) Alexander Thom	(Scotland) Motherwell (loan)	

In addition Hugh Cairney, Joh McMeekin and Fred Williams all played their final 'first XI' games in Dumbarton colours.
