= 1926–27 Dumbarton F.C. season =

Dumbarton
1926–1927 season
- Manager: Donald Colman
- Stadium: Boghead Park, Dumbarton
- Scottish League Division Two: 18th
- Scottish Cup: Second Round
- Top goalscorer: League: H Reid (16); All: H Reid (17)

The 1926–27 season was the 50th Scottish football season in which Dumbarton competed at national level, entering the Scottish Football League and the Scottish Cup. In addition Dumbarton played in the Dumbartonshire Cup.

== Scottish League ==
Dumbarton's fifth successive season in the Second Division saw a further decline in performances, and with 5 defeats coming in their first 7 games it was clear that the team would struggle. In the end a miserable 18th place out of 20 was achieved with 32 points - a distant 34 behind champions Bo'ness. Indeed, going into the last league game, Dumbarton were lying in 19th place and favourites to go through the election process for relegation to the Third Division, but an unbelievable 5–0 away win at Ayr would save their Second Division status.

14 August 1926 League	Albion Rovers	4–0	Dumbarton	Cliftonhill
	Whyte 37', 47', 59'; McKenna 75'			Attendance: 3,000; Referee: A Williamson

21 August 1926 League	Dumbarton	1–1	Clydebank	Boghead Park
	Black 65'		Thomson, G 44'	Attendance: 3,000; Referee: J Holborn

28 August 1926 League	Bathgate	2–1	Dumbarton	Mill Park, Bathgate
	Wales 10'; McInulty 74'		Harvie 87'	Referee: C Ritchie

4 September 1926 League	Dumbarton	1–3	East Fife	Boghead Park
	Main 37'		Grainger 20' (o.g.); Neish 35'; Wood 70'	Attendance: 2,000; Referee: A Scott

11 September 1926 League	Arthurlie	2–1	Dumbarton	Dunterlie Park
	Clark 8'; Semple 89'		Main	Referee: W Jameson

18 September 1926 League	Dumbarton	1–0	Bo'ness	Boghead Park
	Russell 67'			Attendance: 3,000; Referee: A Jamieson

25 September 1926 League	Nithsdale Wanderers	3–0	Dumbarton	Crawick Holm
	Ballantyne; Houston; Price			Referee: W Watson

2 October 1926 League	Dumbarton	3–0	St Bernard's	Boghead Park
	Reid, H Wardern 75' (pen.)			Attendance: 1,500; Referee: W Jamieson

9 October 1926 League	Arbroath	1–3	Dumbarton	Gayfield Park
	Farquhar 37'		Russell 42', 54'; Mair 55'	Attendance: 1,800; Referee: J Hudson

16 October 1926 League	Dumbarton	0–1	King's Park	Boghead Park
			Hunter	Attendance: 1,500; Referee: J McKay

23 October 1926 League	Dumbarton	2–1	Stenhousemuir	Boghead Park
	Harvie 63'; Reid, H 75'		McCaig 33'	Referee: A Jennings

30 October 1926 League	Forfar Athletic	4–2	Dumbarton	Station Park, Forfar
	Hill 25', 27', 30'; Connon		Reid, H	Referee: A Williamson

6 November 1926 League	Armadale	3–4	Dumbarton	Volunteer Park, Armadale
	Morgan 35'; Grove 51'		Reid, H Swan 50'; Main 76'	Attendance: 1,500; Referee: C Ritchie

13 November 1926 League	Dumbarton	1–1	Third Lanark	Boghead Park
	Reid, H 43'		McCulley 48'	Attendance: 2,000; Referee: H Watson

20 November 1926 League	Raith Rovers	4–2	Dumbarton	Starks Park
	Ritchie (pen.); Reay 45'; Dorrans; Allison		Russell 2'	Attendance: 3,500; Referee: J Kilbride

27 November 1926 League	Dumbarton	3–2	East Stirling	Boghead Park
	Main 50', 88'; Warden 51' (pen.)		Russell 80', 81'	Attendance: 2,000; Referee: J Hudson

4 December 1926 League	Alloa Athletic	1–1	Dumbarton	Recreation Park, Alloa
	Swanson 80'		Warden (pen.)	Attendance: 2,000; Referee: H McLachlan

11 December 1926 League	Queen of the South	3–2	Dumbarton	Palmerston Park
	Gilmour; Sheddan; Halliday 40'		Reid, H 80'; Main

18 December 1926 League	Dumbarton	3–5	Ayr United	Boghead Park
	Reid, H 19'; Davin 20'; Muir 65'		Walters 4', 88'; Tollard 35'; Bray	Attendance: 2,000; Referee: C Ritchie

25 December 1926 League	Dumbarton	3–0	Albion Rovers	Boghead Park
	Muir 38'; Cameron 70'; Davin			Referee: J Kilbride

31 December 1926 League	Clydebank	6–2	Dumbarton	Clydeholm Park
	Thomson, G 20'; Evans 25'		Reid, H 90'	Attendance: 4,000; Referee: J Prior

3 January 1927 League	Dumbarton	1–1	Bathgate	Boghead Park
	Muir 35'		Houston 80'	Referee: C MacDonald

8 January 1927 League	East Fife	5–3	Dumbarton	Bayview Park, Methil
	Paterson 46', 89'; Nairn; Wood; Weir		Main; Harvie	Referee: J McLaughlin

15 January 1927 League	Dumbarton	4–1	Arthurlie	Boghead Park
	Mair 13'; Muir 20'; Davin 34' 71' (pen.)		Malloy 73'	Attendance: 2,000; Referee: J McKay

29 January 1927 League	Bo'ness	3–1	Dumbarton	Newtown Park, Bo'ness
	Martin 4'; Gribben 22'; Oswald 42'		Reid, H 60'	Attendance: 1,500; Referee: M Hutton

12 February 1927 League	St Bernard's	1–1	Dumbarton	Royal Gymnasium Ground
	Duke 45'		Reid, H 70'	Referee: W Jamieson

16 February 1927 League	Dumbarton	6–2	Nithsdale Wanderers	Boghead Park
	McHugh 10'; Davin 12'; Mair; Main; Muir		Ballantyne; Allan	Referee: J Kilbride

19 February 1927 League	Dumbarton	1–0	Arbroath	Boghead Park
	Reid, J 74'			Attendance: 1,000; Referee: J Archer

26 February 1927 League	King's Park	2–0	Dumbarton	Forthbank Park
	Scoullar 47'; Gall 67'			Referee: H McLachlan

5 March 1927 League	Stenhousemuir	7–0	Dumbarton	Ochilview Park
	Kemp 5', 8'; Reid 20'; Simpson 47'; McCaig 52'; Lauderdale			Referee: H Watson

12 March 1927 League	Dumbarton	1–3	Forfar Athletic	Boghead Park
	Swanson 90'		Fox 12'; Connon 16'; Hill 78'	Referee: H McLaughlin

19 March 1927 League	Dumbarton	2–0	Armadale	Boghead Park
	Reid, H 42'; Mair 89'			Referee: C McDonald

26 March 1927 League	Third Lanark	2–2	Dumbarton	Cathkin Park
	Brown 30' (pen.); McCurley 85'		Muir 32', 90'	Attendance: 3,000; Referee: J Grant

2 April 1927 League	Raith Rovers	3–1	Dumbarton	Starks Park
	Deuchars 44'; McNeill 54', 76'		Harvie 15'	Referee: J Kilbride

9 April 1927 League	East Stirling	3–2	Dumbarton	Firs Park
	Docherty 40'; Stoddart 48'; McKay 55'		Reid, H 23'; Davin 30'	Referee: J Whitley

16 April 1927 League	Dumbarton	3–1	Alloa Athletic	Boghead Park
	Russell 20'; Reid, H 41'		Lindsay 30'	Referee: W Jamieson

23 April 1927 League	Dumbarton	0–3	Queen of the South	Boghead Park
			Gilmour 40'; Parker 60', 65'	Referee: H McLachlan

30 April 1927 League	Ayr United	0–5	Dumbarton	Somerset Park
			Muir 30'; Russell; Reid, H Main	Referee: H McLachlan

== Scottish Cup ==
Dumbarton reached the second round before losing out to Alloa after a replay.

22 January 1927 Cup R1	East Stirling	0–1	Dumbarton	Firs Park
			Reid, H 67'	Attendance: 2,000; Referee: A Williamson

5 February 1927 Cup R2	Alloa Athletic	1–1	Dumbarton	Recreation Park, Alloa
	McMillan 63'		Russell 3'	Attendance: 3,400; Referee: J Bilney

9 February 1927 Cup R2r	Dumbarton	0–4 (a.e.t.)	Alloa Athletic	Boghead Park
			Cumming 94'; Ferguson 110'; McMillan; O'Shea 120'	Attendance: 3,500; Referee: J Bilney

== Dumbartonshire Cup ==
Dumbarton were again runners-up in the Dumbartonshire Cup. A fortunate 'toss of the coin' win over Clydebank in the replayed semifinal was followed by a heavy defeat to non-league Helesburgh in the final.

27 September 1926 Semi Final	Clydebank	1–1	Dumbarton	Clydeholm Park
	Thomson, D 60'		Grainger 30'	Referee: A Williamson

18 April 1927 Semi Final Replay	Dumbarton	1–1	Clydebank	Boghead Park
	Muir 80'		Paton	Referee: A Williamson

28 April 1927 Final	Helensburgh	6–0	Dumbarton	Helensburgh
	Goal			Attendance: 1,000

== Player statistics ==
=== Squad ===
No.	Pos	Nat	Player	Total		Second Division		Scottish Cup	
No.	Pos	Nat	Player	Apps	Goals	Apps	Goals	Apps	Goals
	GK	(Scotland) SCO	Harry Britton	1	0	1	0	0	0
	GK	(Scotland) SCO	Duncan Yuill	40	0	37	0	3	0
	DF	(Scotland) SCO	John Granger	25	0	22	0	3	0
	DF	(Scotland) SCO	Adam Swanson	28	1	27	1	1	0
	DF	(Scotland) SCO	James Warden	30	3	28	3	2	0
	MF	(Scotland) SCO	David Broadley	4	0	4	0	0	0
	MF	(Scotland) SCO	George Greenshields	7	0	7	0	0	0
	MF	(Scotland) SCO	Andrew Mair	27	4	24	4	3	0
	MF	(Scotland) SCO	Hugh Reid	33	17	30	16	3	1
	MF	(Scotland) SCO	James Reid	11	3	11	3	0	0
	FW	(Scotland) SCO	John Black	4	1	4	1	0	0
	FW	(Scotland) SCO	John Cameron	41	1	38	1	3	0
	FW	(Scotland) SCO	Martin Davin	35	6	32	6	3	0
	FW	(Scotland) SCO	Robert Dennett	10	0	10	0	0	0
	FW	(Scotland) SCO	John Harvie	34	4	31	4	3	0
	FW	(Scotland) SCO	Johnstone	1	0	1	0	0	0
	FW	(Scotland) SCO	David Kyle	4	0	4	0	0	0
	FW	(Scotland) SCO	Robert Main	39	14	36	14	3	0
	FW	(Scotland) SCO	McCabe	1	0	1	0	0	0
	FW	(Scotland) SCO	McHugh	3	1	3	1	0	0
	FW	(Scotland) SCO	Archibald Muir	30	7	27	7	3	0
	FW	(Scotland) SCO	John Russell	19	8	17	7	2	1
	FW	(Scotland) SCO	John Swan	19	1	18	1	1	0
	FW	(Scotland) SCO	Talisman	1	0	1	0	0	0
	FW	(Scotland) SCO	Trialist	4	0	4	0	0	0

=== Transfers ===
==== Players in ====
Player	From	Date
(Scotland) Martin Davin	(Scotland) Vale of Clyde	31 May 1926
(Scotland) Robert Main	(Scotland) St Bernard's	9 Jun 1926
(Scotland) James Reid	(Scotland) Vale of Leven	28 Jul 1926
(Scotland) John Granger	(Scotland) Vale of Leven	29 Jul 1926
(Scotland) John Cameron	(Scotland) Johnstone	9 Aug 1926
(Scotland) David Yuill	(Scotland) St Mirren	19 Aug 1926
(Scotland) George Greenshields	(Scotland) Motherwell	9 Sep 1926
(Scotland) David Kyle	(Scotland) Airdrie	9 Sep 1926
(Scotland) Archibald Muir	(Scotland) Bathgate	21 Oct 1926
(Scotland) Hugh Reid	(Scotland) Stenhousemuir	10 Feb 1927
(Scotland) John Black	(Scotland) Gartsherrie Athletic	

==== Players out ====
Player	To	Date
(Scotland) Archibald McLardie	(Scotland) Johnstone	20 Jul 1926
(Scotland) William Gibson	(United States) emigrated	11 Aug 1926
(Scotland) Harry Britton	(Scotland) Arbroath	23 Sep 1926
(Scotland) David Broadley	(Scotland) Arbroath	23 Sep 1926
(Scotland) Philip Kennedy	(Scotland) Bathgate	6 Oct 1926
(Scotland) David Kyle	(Scotland) Bathgate	30 Nov 1926
(Scotland) John Anderson	(Scotland) Armadale	23 Dec 1926
(Scotland) John McGrath	(Scotland) St Bernard's	21 Jan 1927
(Scotland) Robert Hosie	(United States) Fall River F.C.	
(Scotland) Joseph McDonald	(Scotland) Cowdenbeath	

In addition Francis Carlow, Albert Ferguson, William McDonald, Thomas McKinney, Archibald McNish and Martin Travers all played their last games in Dumbarton 'colours'.
