= Eadon =

Eadon is a surname and male given name. Notable people with this name include:

- John Eadon (1889–1961), Scottish football player
- Robert Eadon Leader (1839–1922), English journalist and historian
- Wilfred Eadon (1915–1999), English cricket player

== See also ==
- Eadon Green Black Cuillin
- Eadon Green Zeclat
