= Duffus (surname) =

Duffus is a surname of Scottish and English origins. In England it originated from terms meaning someone connected to a dovehouse. In Scotland, it originated as a habitational surname for the parish of Duffus.

Notable people with the surname include:

- Carol M. Duffus, British professor
- Chester Stairs Duffus (1891–1981), Canadian military pilot
- Courtney Duffus (born 1995), English-born Irish-Jamaican soccer player
- Dwight Duffus, Canadian-American mathematician
- Herbert Duffus (1908–2002), Jamaican judge
- John Duffus (1901–1975), Scottish soccer player
- Joseph James Duffus (1876–1957), Canadian merchant and parliamentarian
- Joshua Duffus (born 2005), English soccer player
- Louis Duffus (1904–1984), South African cricketer
- Mark Anthony Duffus, British rapper
- Parris Duffus (born 1970), American ice hockey player
- Paul Duffus (born 1969), birth name of British artist Faisal Abdu'Allah
- Robert Duffus (1891–1949), Scottish soccer player

== See also ==
- Lord Duffus
