= Peter Currie =

Peter Currie may refer to:

- Peter Currie (businessman), American executive
- Peter Currie (footballer), Scottish footballer
- Peter Currie (scientist), Australian scientist
