= Joshua Wilkinson =

Joshua Wilkinson may refer to:

- Joshua Marie Wilkinson (born 1977), American poet, editor, publisher, and filmmaker
- Joshua Wilkinson (footballer) (1897–1921), Scottish footballer
