= Joe Willis =

Joe or Joseph Willis may refer to:

- Joe Willis (baseball) (1890–1966), Major League Baseball pitcher
- Joe Willis (American soccer) (born 1988), American soccer player
- Joe Willis (English footballer) (born 2001), English footballer
- Joseph Willis (minister), 19th-century Baptist minister in Louisiana
- Joseph Willis (footballer) (1896–1953), Scottish footballer
- Joe Willis, character in The Faculty
