= James Cumming (footballer) =

Scottish footballer

Personal information
- Full name: James Ferguson Cumming
- Date of birth: 22 April 1886
- Place of birth: Alexandria, Scotland
- Date of death: 8 December 1964 (aged 78)
- Height: 5 ft 6 in (1.68 m)
- Position: Outside right

Senior career*
Years	Team	Apps	(Gls)
- Clydebank Juniors
- Benburb
- Maryhill
1913–1915	Manchester City	35	(3)
1915–1916	Aberdeen	26	(4)
1919	Dumbarton	2	(0)
1920	West Ham United	15	(0)
- * Club domestic league appearances and goals

James Ferguson Cumming (22 April 1886 – 8 December 1964) was a Scottish professional footballer who played as an outside right in the Football League for Manchester City and West Ham United. He also played in the Scottish League for Aberdeen and Dumbarton.

== Personal life ==
In December 1915, late in the second year of the First World War, Cumming attested in the British Army and was transferred to the Army Reserve. He was mobilised in April 1916 and transferred to the Gordon Highlanders. Cumming was transferred to the Royal Engineers in December 1916 and was serving as a sapper when he suffered a gunshot wound to the left foot in June 1917. He was wounded again in June 1918 and was discharged in February 1919.

== Career statistics ==
Appearances and goals by club, season and competition
Club	Season	League			National cup (Note: Includes FA Cup, Scottish Cup)		Other		Total	
Club	Season	Division	Apps	Goals	Apps	Goals	Apps	Goals	Apps	Goals
Manchester City	1913–14	First Division	9	3	5	0	—		14	3
Manchester City	1914–15	First Division	12	0	1	0	—		13	0
Manchester City	Total		35	3	6	0	—		41	3
Aberdeen	1915–16	Scottish First Division	15	3	—		2 (Note: Appearances in Robertson Cup)	0	17	3
Aberdeen	1916–17	Scottish First Division	11	1	—		0	0	11	1
Aberdeen	Total		26	4	—		2	0	28	4
Dumbarton	1918–19	Scottish First Division	2	0	0	0	—		2	0
West Ham United	1919–20	Second Division	10	0	0	0	—		10	0
West Ham United	1920–21	Second Division	5	0	0	0	—		5	0
West Ham United	Total		15	0	0	0	—		15	0
Career total			78	7	6	0	2	0	86	7
