= Order (journal) =

- Discipline: Order theory
- Language: English
- Edited by: Ryan R. Martin

Publication details
- History: 1984–present
- Publisher: Springer Science+Business Media
- Frequency: Quarterly
- Impact factor: 0.353 (2017)

Standard abbreviations
- ISO 4: Order

Indexing
- ISSN: 0167-8094 (print); 1572-9273 (web)
- LCCN: 90650004
- OCLC no.: 1039459749

Links
- Journal homepage; Online archive

Order (subtitled A Journal on the Theory of Ordered Sets and its Applications) is a quarterly peer-reviewed academic journal on order theory and its applications, published by Springer Science+Business Media. It was established in 1984 by Ivan Rival (University of Calgary). From 2010 to 2018, its editor-in-chief was Dwight Duffus (Emory University). He was succeeded in 2019 by Ryan R. Martin (Iowa State University).

== Abstracting and indexing ==
The journal is abstracted and indexed in:

- EBSCO databases
- Mathematical Reviews
- ProQuest databases
- Referativny Zhurnal
- Science Citation Index Expanded
- Scopus
- Zentralblatt Math

According to the Journal Citation Reports, the journal has a 2017 impact factor of 0.353.
