= Nadia Rosenthal =

American scientist

- Born: Nadia A. Rosenthal; 21 February 1953 (age 73); USA
- Father: Laurence Rosenthal
- Scientific career
- Institutions: European Molecular Biology Laboratory, Imperial College, London, Jackson Laboratory

Nadia A. Rosenthal FMedSci is a scientist who specializes in heart development related research. Rosenthal began her undergraduate degree at the University of Wales and then transferred to Harvard. She received her PhD from Harvard Medical School and was an associate professor of biochemistry at Boston University and an associate professor of medicine at Harvard Medical School before transferring to the European Molecular Biology Laboratory where she replaced Klaus Rajewsky who had just gone to work at Harvard Medical School. In 2006, she presented the Howard Hughes Medical Institute's Holiday Lectures together with Douglas A. Melton. She is the editor-in-chief of Differentiation.

Since 2005 Rosenthal has been chair in Cardiovascular Science at Imperial College London. In 2008, Rosenthal was appointed as founding director of the Australian Regenerative Medicine Institute, based at Monash University in Melbourne. Since 2014, she has served as scientific director of the Jackson Laboratory.

Rosenthal is the daughter of Laurence Rosenthal, and she is married to Alan Sawyer, who also worked at EMBL and the Jackson Laboratory.

== Awards ==
- 2010: Honorary degree, Université Pierre et Marie Curie (UPMC), Paris
- 2014: Fellow of the Academy of Medical Sciences
- 2015: Overseas Fellow of the Australian Academy of Health and Medical Sciences
