= Martin Davin =

Scottish footballer

Personal information
- Full name: Martin Davin
- Date of birth: 5 May 1905
- Place of birth: Dumbarton, Scotland
- Date of death: 9 November 1957 (aged 52)
- Place of death: Romford, England
- Height: 5 ft 8 1/2 in (1.74 m)
- Position: Inside right

Youth career
- –1925: Old Kilpatrick
- 1925–1926: Vale of Clyde

Senior career*
Years	Team	Apps	(Gls)
1926–1927	Dumbarton	32	(6)
1927–1930	Bury	38	(8)
1930	Bolton Wanderers	3	(0)
1930–1931	Hull City	8	(1)
1931–1932	Yeovil and Petters United		
1932–1933	Airdrieonians		
1933–1934	Clapton Orient	15	(2)
1934–1935	Ashford		
- * Club domestic league appearances and goals

Martin Davin (5 May 1905 – 9 November 1957) was a Scottish footballer who played in the Scottish Football League for Dumbarton and Airdrieonians, and in the English Football League for Bury, Bolton Wanderers, Hull City and Clapton Orient.

== Career ==
Davin played at Scottish junior league level for Old Kilpatrick of the Scottish Junior League Western Section and then Vale of Clyde of the Glasgow Junior League before, in the summer of 1926 signing with senior level club Dumbarton of the Scottish League Second Division. A year later in August 1927 Davin was transferred to English League First Division club Bury for a £300 fee plus £200 performance related fee. Dumbarton had previously agreed with the Vale of Clyde club to pay them £50 of the transfer fee but this was blocked by the Scottish Football Association which gave rise to legal proceedings, subsequently settled by an agreement.

In Davin's first two seasons with Bury he made 15 appearances scoring four goals; in the third 1929–30 season, following the team's relegation to the Second Division, he played in 23 matches notching four goals. In May 1930 Davin signed for First Division club Bolton Wanderers but three months into the season he was transferred to Third Division North club Hull City where he played for the remainder of the 1930–31 season.

Following the part-season with Hull, Davin signed with Yeovil and Petters United who had just been elected (after a season's absence) back into the Southern League. That season, 1931–32, Yeovil and Petters United were winners of the Southern League Western Division and additionally were runners-up in the supplementary league in which they competed, the Western League. During the summer of 1932 Davin, for whom Hull City had retained his Football League registration, endeavoured to get them to reduce the transfer fee they were asking for him – with partial success. In October 1932, two months after the start of the season Davin moved back to Scotland when he joined Airdrieonians of the Scottish League First Division for the rest of the 1932–33 season.

Airdrieonians placed Davin on their open-to-transfer list at the end of the campaign and after a single season in Scotland he returned to England and signed with Third Division South team Clapton Orient. He played in 15 matches, scoring twice, for "The Os" during the 1933–34 season following which he played with Clapton's nursery team, Ashford, for the 1934–35 Kent League season.
