= Ivan Rival =

Canadian mathematician and computer scientist

Ivan Rival (March 15, 1947 – January 22, 2002 in Ottawa, Ontario, Canada) was a Canadian mathematician and computer scientist, a professor of mathematics at the University of Calgary and of computer science at the University of Ottawa.

Rival's Ph.D. thesis concerned lattice theory. After moving to Calgary he began to work more generally with partially ordered sets, and to study fixed point theorems for partially ordered structures. He was a frequent organizer of conferences in order theory, and in 1984 he founded the journal Order. As a computer scientist at Ottawa, he shifted research topics, applying his expertise in order theory to the study of data structures, computational geometry, and graph drawing.

Rival grew up in Hamilton, Ontario. He earned a bachelor's degree at McMaster University in 1969, and received his Ph.D. from the University of Manitoba in 1974 under the supervision of George Gratzer. After postdoctoral stints visiting Robert Dilworth at Caltech and Rudolf Wille at the Technische Hochschule Darmstadt, he took a faculty position at Calgary in 1975, and was promoted to full professor in 1981. In 1986, he moved to the University of Ottawa, where he became chair of the computer science department.

Rival's doctoral students included Dwight Duffus, the Goodrich C. White Professor of Mathematics & Computer Science at Emory University. Duffus took over the editorship of Order after the retirement (as editor) of William T. Trotter, who took over the editorship from Rival.
