= Australian Regenerative Medicine Institute =

Australian medical research institute

- Founders: Nadia Rosenthal (Founding Director)
- Established: April 2009
- Mission: To transform health through scientific excellence and world-leading research, education and innovation in regenerative medicine.
- Focus: Regenerative medicine; Stem cell research
- Director: Peter Currie
- Faculty: Monash University
- Address: Building 75, Level 1, 15 Innovation Walk, Monash University
- Location: Clayton, Melbourne, Victoria, Australia
- Coordinates: 37°54′38″S 145°7′45″E
- Interactive map of Australian Regenerative Medicine Institute
- Website: www.armi.org.au

The Australian Regenerative Medicine Institute (ARMI) is an Australian medical research institute focused on the discovery, development and translation of regenerative medicines and advanced therapies. Opened in April 2009, the institute is based at the Clayton campus of Monash University, in the Monash Science Technology Research and Innovation Precinct.

ARMI is one of the world's largest regenerative medicine and stem cell research hubs. Its research focuses on heart and muscle development, immunity, neural and stem cell regeneration, organ engineering and synthetic biology to treat inherited rare diseases, neurodegenerative disorders, cardiovascular conditions, cancers and age‑related decline.

Facilities at the institute include AquaCore, one of the Southern Hemisphere's largest aquatic preclinical research facilities.

ARMI has strategic partnerships with the European Molecular Biology Laboratory, EMBL Australia and the University of Osaka, and was a founding member of the Centre for Commercialization of Regenerative Medicine Australia.

== History ==
The institute was established through an A$153 million joint venture between Monash University and the Victorian Government to deliver the next generation of discoveries in regenerative medicine. The Australian Regenerative Medicine Institute was officially opened on 8 April 2009 by Anna Burke MP and Tony Lupton MP in the presence of the Governor of Victoria Dr David de Kretser. Its foundation director was Professor Nadia Rosenthal. Professor Peter Currie was appointed Director in February 2016, following Rosenthal's return to the US.

In 2014, the Currie group (with collaborators) published research describing the process of hematopoietic stem cell (HSC) formation in zebrafish, furthering efforts to produce HSCs in vitro.

== Research groups ==
As of September 2026, there are 16 research groups at the institute.

- Chow Group (founded 2023). Led by Dr Renee Chow, this group uses the zebrafish as a model for developing new treatments for heart valve disease.
- Currie Group (founded 2009). Led by institute director Professor Peter Currie, this group studies zebrafish biology to better understand human diseases. In particular, it investigates how muscle cell types are determined within the developing embryo, how they grow and how they regenerate after injury.
- Enyon Group (founded 2023). Led by Professor Nir Eynon, this group has a focus on the molecular basis of exercise adaptation and ageing. It is working to define how ageing unfolds at a systems level.
- Jaffré Group (founded 2024). This group is led by Associate Professor Fabrice Jaffré and focuses on deciphering the molecular mechanisms underlying congenital heart defects and cardiomyopathies in children with rare genetic disorders, including Noonan syndrome.
- Kaslin Group
- Lieschke Group
- Martino Group
- McGlinn Group (founded 2011). This group is led by Professor Edwina McGlinn and uses mouse genetics to study critical developmental regulators during formation of the vertebral column and spinal cord.
- del Monte-Nieto Group (founded 2018)
- Nilsson Group (founded 2013)
- Polo Group
- Ramialison Group
- Roman Group (founded 2023)
- Rosello-Diez Group (founded 2017)
- Saurat Group (founded 2025). Led by Dr Nathalie Saurat, this team focuses on understanding the cellular mechanisms that regulate ageing in the brain and how these processes contribute to the progression of neurodegenerative diseases such as Alzheimer's.
- Zenker Group (founded 2018)

== See also ==
- Australian Stem Cell Centre
- Health in Australia
