= Valentine Lawrence =

Scottish footballer

Personal information
- Full name: Valentine Lawrence
- Date of birth: 5 May 1889
- Place of birth: Arbroath, Scotland
- Date of death: 1961 (aged 71–72)
- Place of death: Camberwell, England
- Position: Half back

Youth career
- Dundee Violet

Senior career*
Years	Team	Apps	(Gls)
1910–1911	Forfar Athletic		
1911–1912	Manchester City		
1913–1914	Oldham Athletic		
1914–1915	Leeds City		
1915–1916	Dundee Hibernian		
1917–1919	Morton	8	(0)
1918–1919	Dumbarton	11	(0)
- * Club domestic league appearances and goals

Valentine Lawrence (5 May 1889 – 1961) was a Scottish footballer who played for Forfar Athletic, Manchester City, Oldham Athletic, Leeds City, Dundee Hibernian, Morton and Dumbarton.
