= Archibald Mackie =

Scottish footballer

Personal information
- Full name: Archibald S Mackie
- Date of birth: 7 January 1888
- Place of birth: Hutchesontown (Glasgow)
- Date of death: 1975 (aged 86–87)
- Place of death: Fort William, Scotland
- Position: Half back

Youth career
- Rutherglen Glencairn

Senior career*
Years	Team	Apps	(Gls)
1913–1920	Kilmarnock		
1920–1921	Dumbarton	11	(0)
1921	Clydebank		
1921–1923	East Stirlingshire		
- * Club domestic league appearances and goals

Archibald S Mackie (7 January 1888 - 1975) was a Scottish footballer who played for Kilmarnock, Dumbarton, Clydebank and East Stirlingshire.
