= Henry Loney =

Scottish footballer

Personal information
- Full name: Henry Loney
- Date of birth: 26 April 1893
- Place of birth: Denny, Scotland
- Date of death: 2 September 1974
- Place of death: Denny, Scotland
- Position: Half back

Youth career
- Denny Hibernian

Senior career*
Years	Team	Apps	(Gls)
1919–1920	Falkirk	25	(0)
1920–1921	Alloa Athletic		
1921–1924	Dumbarton	110	(7)
1924–1927	Alloa Athletic	89	(3)
- * Club domestic league appearances and goals

Henry Loney (26 April 1893 – 2 September 1974) was a Scottish footballer who played for Falkirk, Alloa Athletic (two spells, the first while the club was in the Central League) and Dumbarton during the 1920s. He was the cousin of Scotland international Willie Loney.
