= Dwight Duffus =

Canadian-American mathematician

Dwight Albert Duffus is a Canadian-American mathematician, the Goodrich C. White Professor of Mathematics & Computer Science at Emory University and editor-in-chief of the journal Order.

Duffus did his undergraduate studies at the University of Regina, graduating in 1974; he received his Ph.D. in 1978 from the University of Calgary under the supervision of Ivan Rival.

In 1986 Duffus received Emory University's Emory Williams Teaching Award, its highest award for teaching excellence. He served as chair of the Mathematics & Computer Science Department at Emory for many years, beginning in 1991.
