= Carol M. Duffus =

Crop scientist professor

Carol M. Duffus PhD, DIC, FRSA, FRSE is a British professor who specialised in crop science and technology. She worked in the Scotland's Rural College (SRUC) at King's Buildings, Edinburgh, when in 1995, she was made a Fellow of the Royal Society of Edinburgh.

Duffus was first female president of the Association of Applied Biologists, and wrote a cameo piece The Influence of the Association on Public Opinion in the centenary newsletter, about the (lack) of opportunity to use the influence of biological scientists on UK government policy development, whilst recognising that some consultations during her tenure, have penetrated, though not perhaps into the wider public eye.

Her research interests have include plant growth regulation and growth biochemistry in cereals, including her doctoral thesis on carbohydrate synthesis.

She co-authored a book on seeds (1980), and co-edited another on toxic substances in crop plants (1991), as well as monographs on carbohydrate synthesis (1984,1986).

Her work has included research on amyloplasts and further biochemical research in the development of barley. She has also investigated the development of starch production for industrial use.
