= Old Kilpatrick F.C. =

Association football club in Dunbartonshire, Scotland

Old Kilpatrick
- Full name: Old Kilpatrick Football Club
- Nickname: the O.K.s
- Founded: 1888
- Dissolved: 1893
- Ground: High Lusset Park
- Hon. Secretary: J. M'Arthur, A. Wood
- Match Secretary: G. M. Goudie, P. Coulter
Home colours

Old Kilpatrick Football Club was an association football club based in the Scottish village of Old Kilpatrick, Dunbartonshire.

== History ==
The first football match played in Old Kilpatrick took place in a field at Erskine in May 1877, when an Old Kilpatrick club lost to a club from the nearby village of Bowling by two goals, plus one disputed, to nil.

The game revived in the village with the formation of the Old Kilpatrick club a decade later, and it entered the Dunbartonshire Cup for the first time in 1888–89. Not daunted by a defeat to the new Clydebank club in the first round, Old Kilpatrick joined the Scottish Football Association in August 1889, and entered the Scottish Cup for the first time that month. However the club suffered a 7–1 defeat at home to Union in the first round; in the Dunbartonshire Cup, the club was drawn to face Vale of Leven, and, facing certain defeat, had an offer from the Vale to scratch from the tie. The O.K.s refused, which meant the Vale had to turn down a more lucrative friendly with St Mirren, and the Vale showed no mercy, taking a 14–1 lead after an hour, when the match was stopped out of sheer mercy.

The club entered the Dunbartonshire Cup until 1891–92, and the Scottish Cup until 1892–93, but lost every tie it played. The club also had a similar lack of success in the Buchanan Charity Cup, which it entered in 1888–89, 1889–90, and 1891–92, conceding 7, 7, and 8 goals in its three ties, albeit, by being given a bye to the final in 1889–90, the club was at least counted as runner-up to Clydebank.

Old Kilpatrick was never a frequent participant in friendlies, and its last record is its scratching from the first preliminary round of the 1892–93 Scottish Cup.

The name was revived in 1898 for a Junior club, which also played at High Lusset Park.

== Colours ==
The club wore dark blue.

== Ground ==
The club played at High Lusset Park.

== Notable players ==
- Thomas Campbell, formerly of Abercorn and Partick Thistle, joined the club in 1891
