= Eadon Green Zeclat =

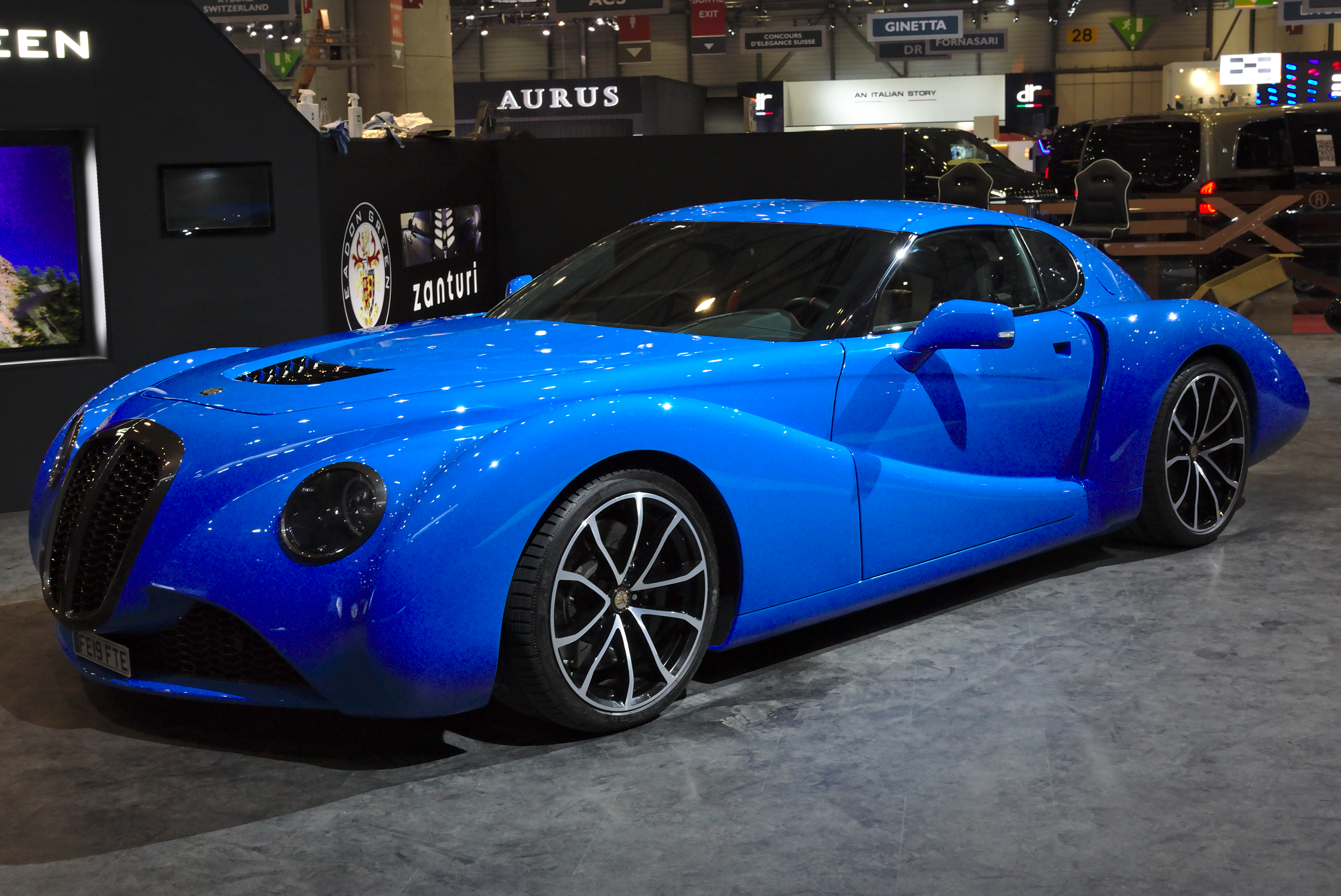

Overview
- Manufacturer: Eadon Green
- Model years: 2018-present
- Designer: Eadon Green

Body and chassis
- Class: Sports car (S)
- Body style: 2-door coupe
- Layout: FR layout
- Doors: Two
- Related: Chevrolet Corvette (C7)

Powertrain
- Engine: 6.2 L LT1 V8
- Transmission: 7-speed Tremec TR-6070 manual with Active ReV Match; 8-speed 8L90 Hydra-Matic Automatic

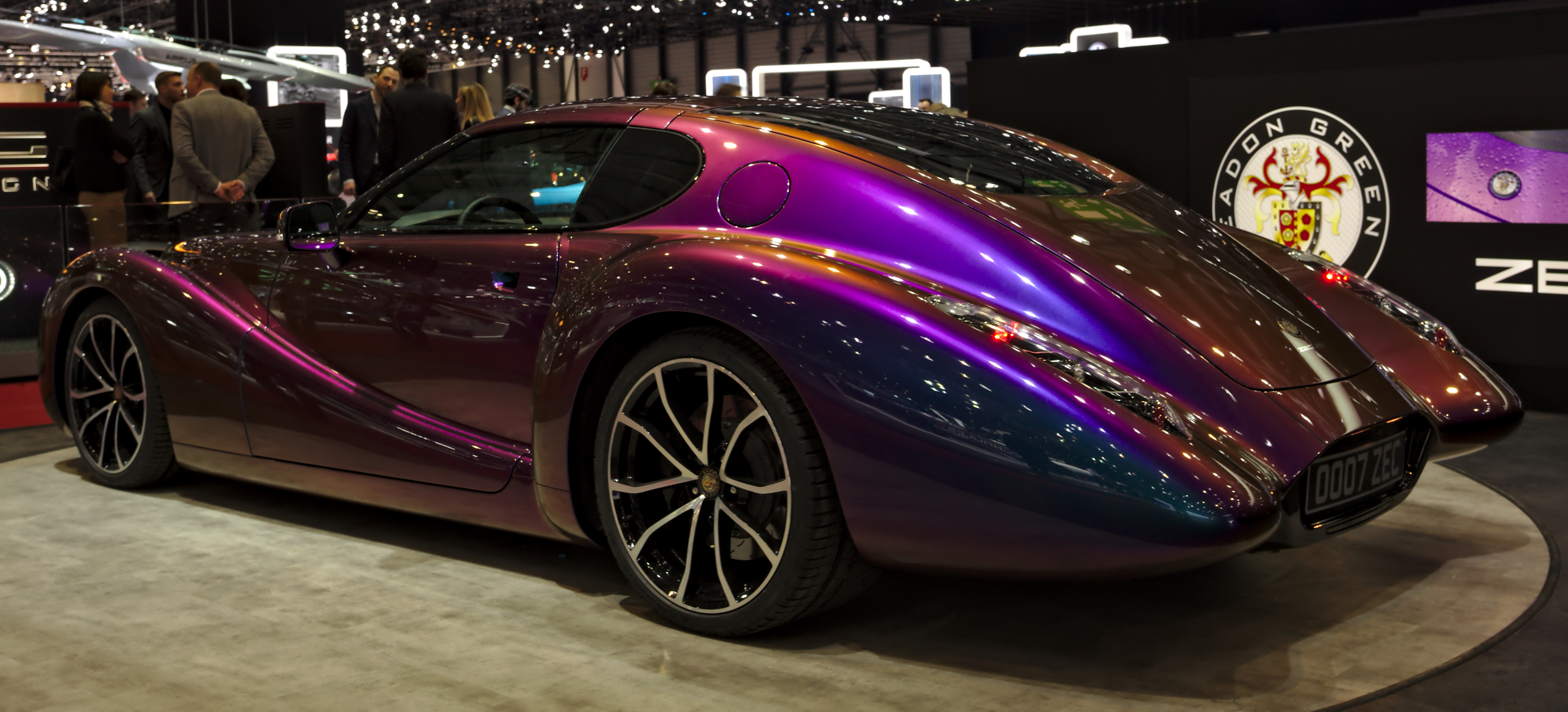
Rear view of the Eadon Green Zeclat

The Eadon Green Zeclat is a retro-styled British sports car introduced in 2018. It is the second model in the Eadon Green range alongside the bigger Black Cuillin.

== Model information ==
The Zeclat is produced by Eadon Green, a boutique British sports car maker who also built the Black Cuillin concept in 2017. The Zeclat features a retro-styled, 1930s-inspired body designed by Eadon Green. Eadon Green aims to build 25 Zeclats per year and says if they were to build 25 units the price would be around £550,000, but if they built fewer it would be closer to £1,000,000.

== Performance ==
The Zeclat is based on the Chevrolet Corvette (C7) platform and is powered by the 6.2 L GM LT1 V8 engine from the Corvette. It produces the same 460 hp (340 kW) and 465 lb-ft (630 Nm) of torque as the Corvette and power goes through either a seven-speed manual with Active ReV Match or an optional Hydra-Matic eight-speed automatic. The retro styled body is made of carbon fiber and the interior is mostly shared with the Corvette, although it features some hand stitched leather, and carbon fiber trim.

== See also ==
- Eadon Green Black Cuillin
