= James Martin (footballer, born 1893) =

Scottish footballer

Personal information
- Full name: James Martin
- Date of birth: 21 August 1892
- Place of birth: Bo'ness, Scotland
- Date of death: 9 February 1958 (aged 64)
- Place of death: Portsmouth, England
- Position: Left half

Youth career
- Bo'ness

Senior career*
Years	Team	Apps	(Gls)
1915–1916	Heart of Midlothian	33	(0)
1916–1919	Rangers	39	(5)
1917	→ Airdrieonians (loan)	2	(1)
1918	→ Morton (loan)	3	(1)
1918–1919	→ Falkirk (loan)	28	(5)
1919–1920	Dumbarton	15	(1)
1920	Bo'ness		
1921–1927	Portsmouth	209	(27)
1927	Montrose		
1927–1928	Aldershot		
- * Club domestic league appearances and goals

James Martin (21 August 1892 – 9 February 1940) was a Scottish footballer who played for Hearts, Dumbarton, Rangers and Portsmouth, mainly as a left half. He won the Scottish Football League championship with Rangers in the 1917–18 season, making 18 appearances (although he also spent time on loan with both Airdrieonians and Morton during that campaign, and the whole of the next at Falkirk). He moved to English football with Portsmouth in 1921 and became a regular and eventually captain at Fratton Park, making over 200 appearances and winning the Football League Third Division South title in 1923–24. After leaving Pompey in 1927, he had short spells at Montrose and Aldershot.
