= Peter Currie (scientist) =

Australian biologist

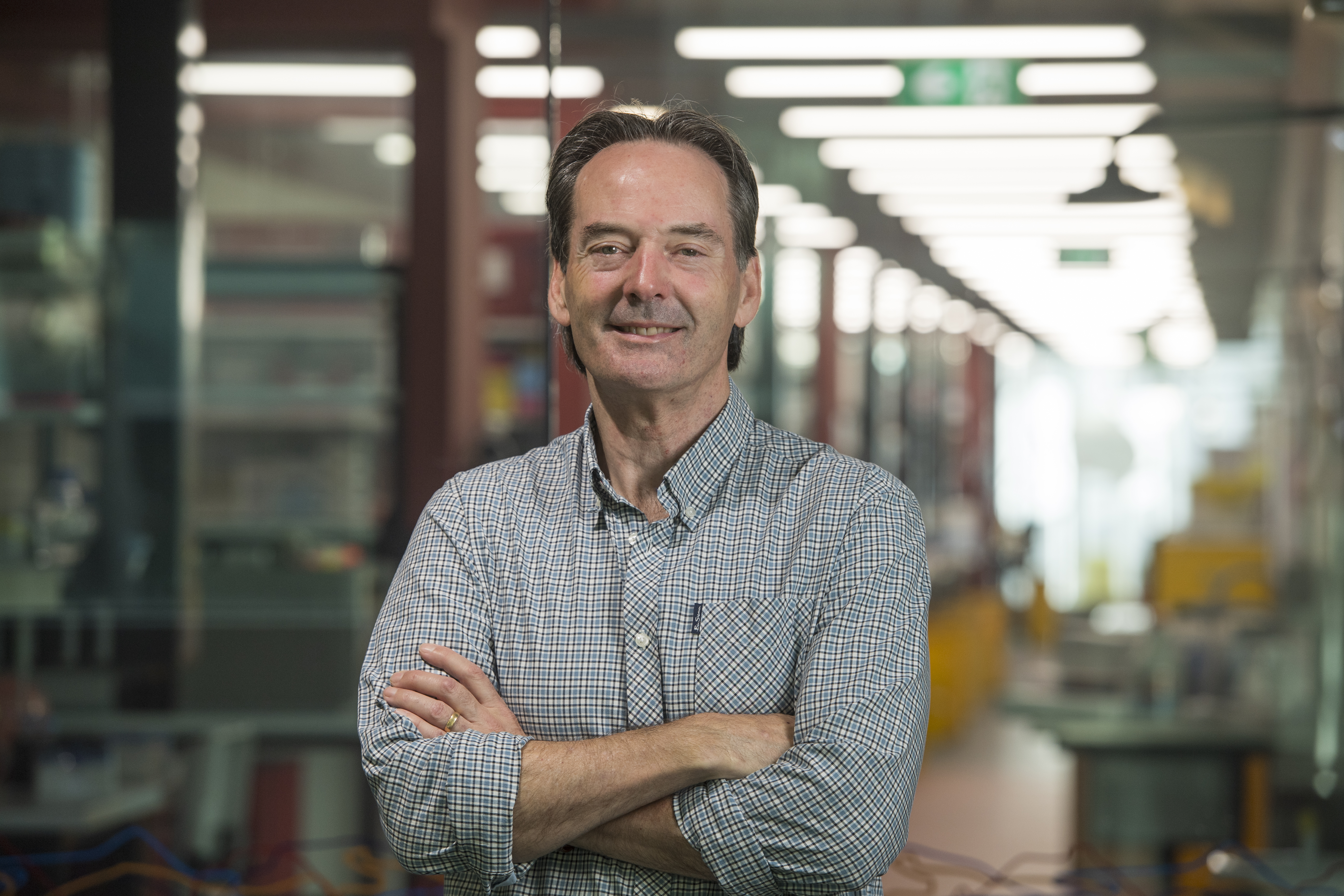
- Currie in 2024
- Awards: Australian Museum Eureka Prize (2016) Elected as an International Fellow of the Royal Society of Edinburgh (2019-) Fellow of the Australian Academy of Science (FAA) (2020-)
- Scientific career
- Fields: Developmental biology, Zebrafish biology
- Institutions: Australian Regenerative Medicine Institute

Peter D. Currie is an Australian developmental and stem cell biologist. He is a professor and director of the Australian Regenerative Medicine Institute at Monash University.

== Research and career ==
Currie studied at The University of Melbourne. He received his PhD in Drosophila genetics from Syracuse University, New York, USA, in 1993. He undertook postdoctoral training in zebrafish development at the Imperial Cancer Research Fund (now Cancer Research UK) in London, UK. Currie worked as an independent laboratory head at the UK Medical Research Council Human Genetics Unit in Edinburgh, UK and from 2003 onwards at the Victor Chang Cardiac Research Institute in Sydney, Australia where he headed a research programme focused on skeletal muscle development and regeneration.

In 2008 Currie became Deputy Director of the Australian Regenerative Medicine Institute (ARMI) at Monash University in Melbourne, Australia, and was appointed Director of Research in 2016. He currently is group leader and also an Australian EMBL partnership laboratory head. He is a recipient of a European Molecular Biology Organization Young Investigators Award and a Wellcome Trust International Research Fellowship and currently is a Senior Principal Research Fellow with the National Health and Medical Research Council in Australia.

Currie investigates the genetic basis of skeletal muscle stem cell action during development, evolution, regeneration and disease. His key discoveries utilise several models, chiefly the zebrafish, to define the genetic and evolutionary basis for muscle formation and growth throughout vertebrate phylogeny. He has played a key role globally in developing zebrafish as a disease model for human muscle disease and regeneration biology. He has also been instrumental in establishing shark embryology as a modern evolutionary paradigm to understand the evolutionary origins of the vertebrate body plan.

== Awards and honours ==
- Australian Museum Eureka Prize 2015 (with Phong Nguyen and Georgina Hollway)
- President's Medal of the Australian and New Zealand Society of Cell and Developmental Biology 2017
- Fellow of the Australian Academy of Science (FAA) since 2020
- EMBO Associate Member 2025
