= James Young (footballer, born 1891) =

Scottish footballer

Personal information
- Full name: James Young
- Date of birth: 1 March 1891
- Position: Outside forward

Senior career*
Years	Team	Apps	(Gls)
- Glencraig Celtic
1917–1918	Lochgelly United		
1917	→ Raith Rovers (loan)		
1918	→ Kilmarnock (loan)	2	(1)
1918	→ Celtic (loan)	1	(0)
1918–1919	Rangers	4	(0)
1919–1920	Dumbarton	5	(0)
- * Club domestic league appearances and goals

James Young (born 1 March 1891) was a Scottish footballer who played for Lochgelly United, Raith Rovers, Kilmarnock, Celtic, Rangers and Dumbarton.

Young played one game for Celtic on 9 February 1918 while on loan from Lochgelly United against Hearts at Celtic Park, as the Bhoys ran out 3–0 victors; however Celtic were unwilling to meet Lochgelly's £250 asking price for the player so he did not stay with the club. He signed for Rangers the following week and played in four matches before the end of the season as the Gers won the Scottish Football League title by a point over their Glasgow rivals, but did not feature again, moving on to Dumbarton in January 1919.

== See also ==
- Played for Celtic and Rangers
