= Eadon Green Black Cuillin =

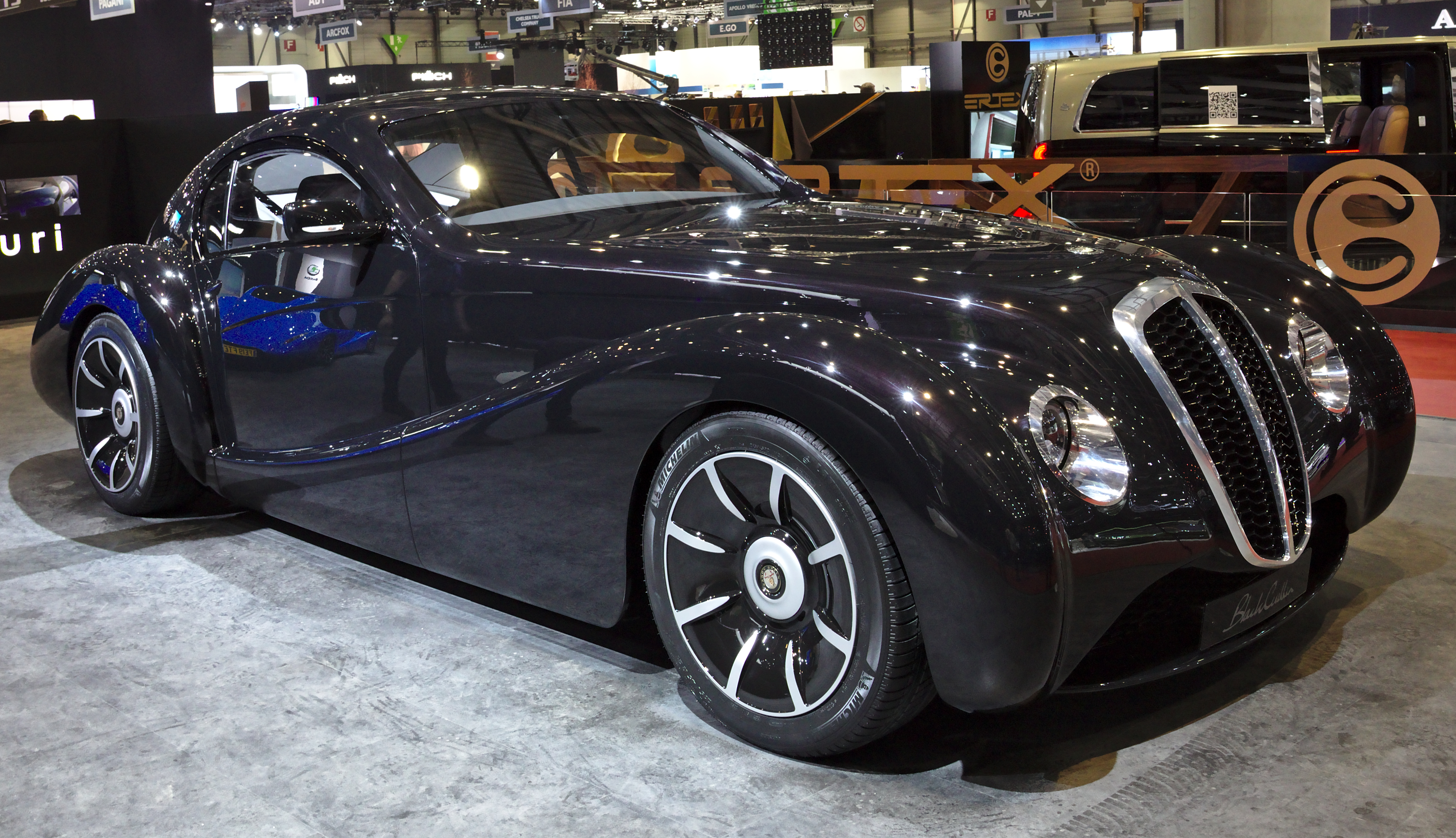

Overview
- Type: Concept car
- Manufacturer: Eadon Green
- Production: 2017

Body and chassis
- Body style: 2-door coupe
- Layout: FR layout

Powertrain
- Engine: 6.0L V12
- Transmission: 6-speed ZF 6HP automatic

The Eadon Green Black Cuillin is a British concept car built by Eadon Green and introduced at the 2017 Geneva Motor Show.

== Design ==
The design of the Black Cuillin is inspired by that of the 1937 Alfa Romeo 8C 2900 and was designed with CAD.

== Specifications ==
The concept Black Cuillin features a full carbon fibre body, but Eadon Green founder Felix Eaton says a production model would use an aluminum body. It is powered by a modern V12 engine that reportedly comes from a "high-end European manufacturer", the identity of which has not been revealed, though some sources speculate the engine may be a BMW N73B60.

== See also ==
- Eadon Green Zeclat
