= Wilfred Eadon =

English cricketer

Personal information
- Full name: Wilfred Myles Eadon
- Born: 19 June 1915; Torry Hill, Kent, England
- Died: November 1999 (aged 84); Westminster, London, England
- Batting: Right-handed
- Bowling: Leg break googly

Domestic team information
- Years: Team
- 1934: Oxford University

Career statistics
Competition	First-class
Matches	1
Runs scored	17
Batting average	8.50
100s/50s	–/–
Top score	14
Balls bowled	102
Wickets	3
Bowling average	29.33
5 wickets in innings	–
10 wickets in match	–
Best bowling	2/61
Catches/stumpings	–/–
- Source: Cricinfo, 29 February 2020

Wilfred Myles Eadon (19 June 1915 – November 1999) was an English first-class cricketer.

Eadon was born in June 1915 at Torry Hill, Kent. He later studied at Trinity College, Oxford. While studying at Oxford, he made a single appearance in first-class cricket for Oxford University against the Free Foresters at Oxford in 1934. Batting twice in the match, he was dismissed for 3 runs by Raymond Robertson-Glasgow in the Oxford first-innings, while in their second-innings he was dismissed for 14 runs by the same bowler. With his leg break googly bowling, he took the wickets of Robert Scott and Joseph Comber in the Free Foresters first-innings, in addition to taking the wicket of Guy Jackson in their second-innings to finish with match figures of 3 for 88. Eadon later served in the British Army during the Second World War, being commissioned as a second lieutenant in the Dorset Regiment in April 1940, with the service number of 126959. He died at Westminster in November 1999.
