= Richard Field (footballer) =

English footballer

Personal information
- Date of birth: 2 August 1891
- Place of birth: Sunderland, England
- Date of death: 15 July 1965 (aged 73)
- Place of death: Sunderland, England
- Height: 5 ft 10 in (1.78 m)
- Position: Half back

Youth career
- Willington

Senior career*
Years	Team	Apps	(Gls)
1914–1915	Sunderland		
1921–1922	Dumbarton	8	(0)
1923–1924	Norwich City		
1924–1925	Grimsby Town		
- * Club domestic league appearances and goals

Richard Field (2 August 1891 – 15 July 1965) was an English footballer who played for Sunderland, Dumbarton, Norwich City and Grimsby Town.
