= 1926–27 Scottish Division Two =

Scottish Second Division
- Season: 1926–27
- Champions: Bo'ness
- Promoted: Bo'ness; Raith Rovers

The 1926–27 Scottish Second Division was won by Bo'ness who, along with second placed Raith Rovers, were promoted to the First Division. Nithsdale Wanderers finished bottom.

== Table ==
Pos	Team	Pld	W	D	L	GF	GA	GD	Pts	Promotion or relegation
1	Bo'ness	38	23	10	5	86	41	+45	56	Promotion to the 1927–28 First Division
2	Raith Rovers	38	21	7	10	92	52	+40	49	Promotion to the 1927–28 First Division
3	Clydebank	38	18	9	11	94	75	+19	45	
4	Third Lanark	38	17	10	11	67	48	+19	44	
5	East Stirlingshire	38	18	8	12	93	75	+18	44	
6	East Fife	38	19	3	16	103	91	+12	41	
7	Arthurlie	38	18	5	15	90	83	+7	41	
8	Ayr United	38	13	15	10	67	68	−1	41	
9	Forfar Athletic	38	15	7	16	66	79	−13	37	
10	Stenhousemuir	38	12	12	14	69	76	−7	36	
11	Queen of the South	38	16	4	18	72	80	−8	36	
12	King's Park	38	13	9	16	76	75	+1	35	
13	St Bernard's	38	14	6	18	70	77	−7	34	
14	Alloa Athletic	38	12	10	16	70	77	−7	34	
15	Armadale	38	12	10	16	70	78	−8	34	
16	Albion Rovers	38	11	11	16	74	87	−13	33	
17	Bathgate	38	13	7	18	76	98	−22	33	
18	Dumbarton	38	13	6	19	69	84	−15	32	
19	Arbroath	38	13	6	19	64	83	−19	32	
20	Nithsdale Wanderers	38	7	9	22	59	100	−41	23	Left the League
