= Joseph Willis (footballer) =

Scottish footballer

Personal information
- Full name: Joseph Dawson Willis
- Date of birth: 21 April 1896
- Place of birth: Canongate, Scotland
- Date of death: 10 August 1953 (aged 57)
- Place of death: Broxburn
- Position: Half back

Senior career*
Years	Team	Apps	(Gls)
1919–1920	Dumbarton	2	(0)
1920–1921	Bo'ness		
1921–1922	East Fife		
1923–1926	Kilmarnock		
- * Club domestic league appearances and goals

Joseph Dawson Willis (21 April 1896 – 10 August 1953) was a Scottish footballer who played for Dumbarton, Bo'ness, East Fife and Kilmarnock.
