= John Granger (footballer) =

Scottish footballer

Personal information
- Full name: John Granger
- Date of birth: 16 July 1899
- Place of birth: Dumbarton, Scotland

Youth career
- Vale of Leven Juniors

Senior career*
| Years | Team | Apps | (Gls) |
| 1918–1921 | St Mirren | | |
| 1921–1922 | Dumbarton | 4 | (0) |
| 1922–1924 | Celtic | | |
| 1924–1925 | Forfar Athletic | | |
| 1926–1931 | Dumbarton | 32 | (0) |
- * Club domestic league appearances and goals

John Granger (born 16 July 1899) was a Scottish footballer who played for St Mirren, Dumbarton, Celtic and Forfar Athletic.
