= Joshua Wilkinson (footballer) =

Scottish footballer

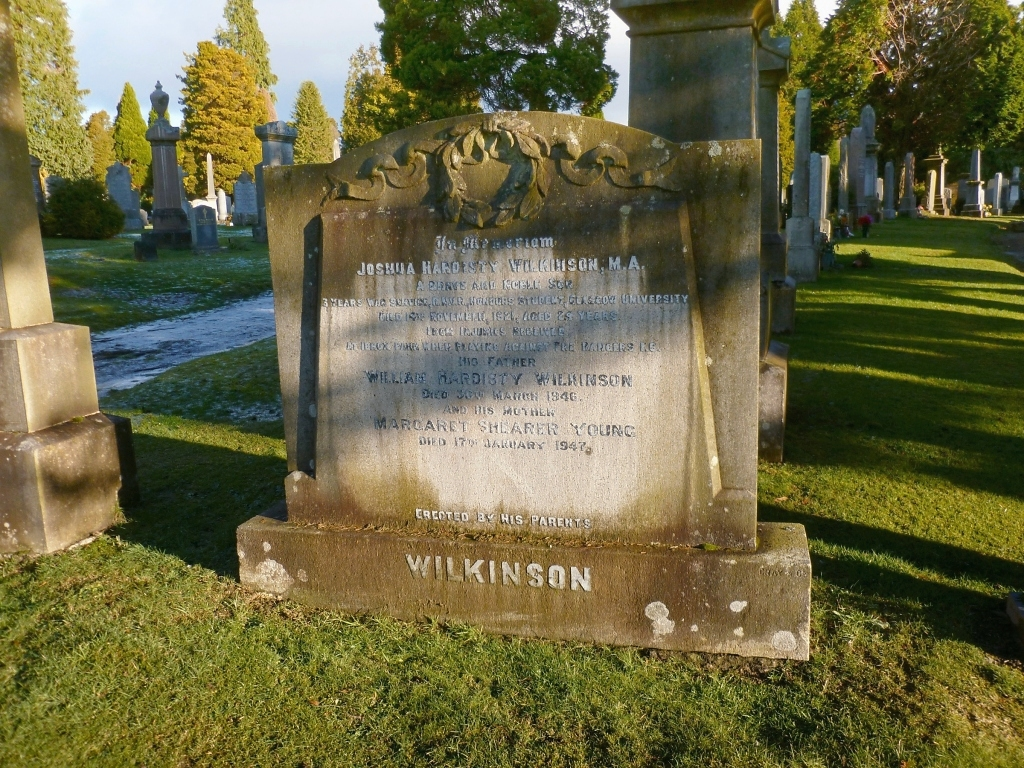
- Wilkinson's headstone in Dumbarton cemetery

Personal information
- Full name: Joshua Hardisty Wilkinson
- Date of birth: 14 September 1897
- Place of birth: Anderston, Scotland
- Date of death: 14 November 1921 (aged 24)
- Place of death: Glasgow, Scotland
- Position: Goalkeeper

Youth career
- Dumbarton Academy

Senior career*
| Years | Team | Apps | (Gls) |
| 1919–1920 | Rangers | 0 | (0) |
| 1920–1921 | Renton | | |
| 1921 | Dumbarton | 16 | (0) |
- * Club domestic league appearances and goals

Joshua Hardisty Wilkinson (14 September 1897 – 14 November 1921) was a Scottish footballer who played as a goalkeeper for Dumbarton and Rangers. He died from peritonitis at the age of 24, two days after keeping goal for Dumbarton in a "particularly rough" match against his former club Rangers in 1921.

== See also ==
- List of association footballers who died while playing
