= John Eadon =

Scottish footballer

Personal information
- Full name: John Pollock Eadon
- Date of birth: 3 September 1889
- Place of birth: Coatbridge, Scotland
- Date of death: 1961 (aged 71–72)
- Position: Goalkeeper

Senior career*
Years	Team	Apps	(Gls)
1909–1915	Maryhill	104	(0)
1915	Tottenham Hotspur	5	(0)
1915–1916	Albion Rovers		
1918–1919	Ayr United	14	(0)
1918–1919	Dumbarton	1	(0)
1920–1921	Morton	1	(0)
1921–1923	Johnstone	7	(0)
- * Club domestic league appearances and goals

John Pollock Eadon (3 September 1889 – 1961) was a Scottish professional footballer who played for Maryhill, Tottenham Hotspur, Albion Rovers, Ayr United, Dumbarton, Morton, and Johnstone.

== Football career ==
Eadon began his career with local club Maryhill. The goalkeeper joined Tottenham Hotspur and played five matches in 1915.
