= Andrew Mair =

Scottish footballer

Personal information
- Full name: Andrew Mair
- Position: Midfielder

Senior career*
| Years | Team | Apps | (Gls) |
| 1921–1928 | Dumbarton | 174 | (12) |
- * Club domestic league appearances and goals

Andrew Mair was a Scottish football player, who played for Dumbarton during the 1920s.
