= Peter Currie (footballer) =

Scottish footballer

Personal information
- Position: Outside left

Senior career*
Years	Team	Apps	(Gls)
- Armadale
1913–1919	Bradford City	17	(2)
1920–1921	Dumbarton	4	
- Broxburn
- * Club domestic league appearances and goals

Peter Currie was a Scottish professional footballer who played as an outside left.

== Career ==
Currie played for Armadale, Bradford City, Dumbarton and Broxburn. For Bradford City he made 17 appearances in the Football League, scoring 2 goals.

== Sources ==
- Frost, Terry (1988). Bradford City A Complete Record 1903-1988. Breedon Books Sport. ISBN 0-907969-38-0.
