= Andrew Chalmers (footballer) =

Scottish footballer

Personal information
- Date of birth: 1899
- Place of birth: Girvan, Scotland
- Height: 5 ft 9 in (1.75 m)
- Position: Inside left

Senior career*
Years	Team	Apps	(Gls)
1920–1922	Dumbarton	35	(5)
1922–1926	Bradford City	118	(19)
- Kettering Town
- * Club domestic league appearances and goals

Andrew Chalmers (born 1899) was a Scottish professional footballer who played as an inside left.

== Career ==
Born in Girvan, Chalmers played for Dumbarton, Bradford City and Kettering Town. For Bradford City, he made 118 appearances in the Football League, scoring 19 goals. He also made 7 FA Cup appearances.

== Sources ==
- Frost, Terry (1988). Bradford City A Complete Record 1903-1988. Breedon Books Sport. ISBN 0-907969-38-0.
- McAllister, Jim (2002). The Sons of the Rock - The Official History of Dumbarton Football Club. Dumbarton: J&J Robertson Printers.
