= James Scott (footballer, born 1882) =

Scottish footballer

Personal information
- Full name: James Scott
- Date of birth: 1882
- Place of birth: Stevenston, Scotland
- Position: Right half

Senior career*
| Years | Team | Apps | (Gls) |
- Stevenston United
- Ardeer Thistle
| 1911–1912 | Liverpool | 10 | (0) |
| 1919–1921 | Dumbarton | 63 | (1) |
| 1921–1925 | Third Lanark | 2 | (0) |
| 1923–1925 | New York Giants | 36 | (1) |
- * Club domestic league appearances and goals

James Scott (born 1882) was a Scottish footballer who played for Liverpool, Dumbarton, Third Lanark and New York Giants.
