= Duncan Walker =

Scottish footballer

Personal information
- Full name: Duncan Campbell Walker
- Date of birth: 24 November 1896
- Place of birth: Garscube Road, Glasgow, Scotland
- Date of death: 20 September 1961 (aged 64)
- Place of death: Hairmyres Hospital, East Kilbride
- Height: 5 ft 8 1/2 in (1.74 m)
- Position: Centre forward

Senior career*
Years	Team	Apps	(Gls)
- Kilsyth Rangers
1918–1921	Dumbarton	61	(35)
1920–1923	St Mirren	75	(65)
1923–1927	Nottingham Forest	82	(29)
1927–1928	Bo'ness	4	(0)
- * Club domestic league appearances and goals

Duncan Campbell Walker (12 October 1899 – 9 September 1963) was a Scottish association football player for clubs including Dumbarton, St Mirren and Nottingham Forest. He finished as the top scorer in the Scottish Football League Division One in the 1921–22 season.

== Career ==
=== Nottingham Forest ===
Walker made his debut for Nottingham Forest on 25 August 1923 away at Everton and scored his first goal in his second game on 27 August 1923 at home to West Bromwich Albion. He finished as Forest's top scorer in the 1923–24 season with 17 league goals. In 1924–25 he again finished top scorer with eight goals, but the team was relegated to the Second Division. His last game for the club was on 15 April 1927.
