= Joseph Till =

English footballer

Personal information
- Full name: Joseph Henry Till
- Date of birth: 21 August 1892
- Place of birth: Stoke-on-Trent, England
- Date of death: 1955 (aged 62–63)
- Position: Full-back

Senior career*
Years	Team	Apps	(Gls)
1914–1919	Wellington Town		
1919–1921	Dumbarton	74	(0)
1921–1923	St Mirren		
1923–1928	Luton Town	138	(1)
1928–1929	Crewe Alexandra	0	(0)
- * Club domestic league appearances and goals

Joseph Henry Till (21 August 1892 – 1955) was an English footballer who played as a full-back for Dumbarton, St Mirren, Luton Town and Crewe Alexandra.
