= Alexander Thom (footballer) =

Scottish footballer

Personal information
- Full name: Alexander Thom
- Date of birth: 10 October 1894
- Place of birth: Stevenston, Scotland
- Date of death: 1 October 1973 (aged 78)
- Place of death: Old Kilpatrick, Scotland
- Height: 5 ft 7 1/2 in (1.71 m)
- Position: Outside left

Youth career
- Yoker Athletic

Senior career*
Years	Team	Apps	(Gls)
1913–1920	Dumbarton	222	(41)
1917–1918	Kilmarnock (loan)		
1917–1918	Ayr United (loan)		
1918–1919	Motherwell (loan)		
1920–1921	Morton		
1921–1922	Airdrieonians		
1922–1923	Hull City	138	(18)
1926–1927	Swindon Town	101	(24)
- * Club domestic league appearances and goals

Alexander Thom (10 October 1894 – 1 October 1973) was a Scottish footballer who played for Dumbarton, Kilmarnock, Ayr United, Motherwell, Morton, Airdrieonians, Hull City and Swindon Town.
