= John Rowan (footballer) =

Scottish footballer

Personal information
- Full name: John Rowan
- Date of birth: 16 August 1890
- Place of birth: Hill of Beath, Scotland
- Date of death: 4 December 1963 (aged 73)
- Place of death: Coatbridge, Scotland
- Position: Centre forward

Youth career
- Glasgow Perthshire

Senior career*
Years	Team	Apps	(Gls)
1910–1920	Dumbarton	114	(59)
1919–1921	Hamilton Academical		
1921–1922	Dunfermline Athletic		
- * Club domestic league appearances and goals

John G Rowan (16 August 1890 – 4 December 1963) was a Scottish footballer who played for Dumbarton, Hamilton Academical, and Dunfermline Athletic.
