= John Duffus =

Scottish footballer

Personal information
- Full name: John Murison Duffus
- Date of birth: 10 May 1901
- Place of birth: Aberdeen, Scotland
- Date of death: 18 September 1975 (aged 74)
- Place of death: Stockport, England
- Position: Forward

Youth career
- Aberdeen Richmond

Senior career*
Years	Team	Apps	(Gls)
1919–1920	Dumbarton	5	(0)
1921–1922	Millwall		
1922–1923	Clapton Orient		
1923–1924	Tottenham Hotspur		
1924–1925	Norwich City		
1927–1928	Stockport County		
- * Club domestic league appearances and goals

John Murison Duffus (10 May 1901 – 18 September 1975) was a Scottish footballer who played for Dumbarton, Millwall, Clapton Orient, Tottenham Hotspur, Norwich City and Stockport County.
