= John Miller (footballer, born 1890) =

Scottish footballer

John Blackstock Miller
Personal information
- Full name: John Blackstock Miller
- Date of birth: 1890
- Place of birth: Dumbarton, Scotland
- Date of death: 24 November 1932 (aged 41–42)
- Place of death: Glasgow, Scotland
- Position: Goalkeeper

Senior career*
Years	Team	Apps	(Gls)
1911–1921	Dumbarton	207	(0)
- → Renton (loan)
1916	→ Airdrieonians (loan)	5	(0)
- → St Mirren (loan)
1919	→ Rangers (loan)	1	(0)
1921–1922	Bo'ness	24	(0)
- * Club domestic league appearances and goals

John Blackstock Miller (1890 – 24 November 1932) was a Scottish footballer who played as a goalkeeper for Dumbarton. He also had a short spell with St Mirren in 1918-19 and loan spells with Renton (1914–15), Airdrieonians (16) and Rangers (1919).
