= Suzanne Urverg-Ratsimamanga =

French-Malagasy Ashkenazi Jews physician and biochemist (1928–2016)

Professor Suzanne Urverg-Ratsimamanga FAAS FTWAS
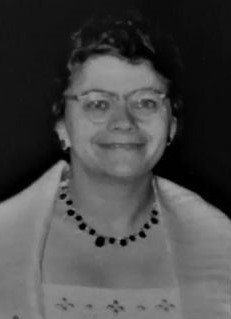
- Suzanne Urverg in 1972
- Born: 18 June 1928; Paris, France
- Died: March 16, 2016 (aged 87); Cimetière parisien de Bagneux, Paris, France
- Citizenship: France; Madagascar
- Spouse: Albert Rakoto Ratsimamanga
- Scientific career
- Fields: Nutraceutical; Pharmacopoeia; Herbal medicine
- Workplaces: Malagasy Institute of Applied Research

Suzanne Urverg-Ratsimamanga (18 June 1928 – 16 March 2016) was a French-Malagasy Ashkenazi Jewish physician and biochemist. She was married to Albert Rakoto Ratsimamanga, with whom she founded the Malagasy Institute of Applied Research.

== Early life and education ==
Suzanne Urverg was born in Paris on 18 June 1928. She received her Bachelor of Science in 1953, Doctor of Medicine in 1954, and Diploma and Master of Science in Industrial Hygiene and Medicine in 1955, all from the University of Paris.

== Research and career ==
Urverg married Albert Rakoto Ratsimamanga on 23 March 1963, and was his closest scientific collaborator. Together they founded the Malagasy Institute of Applied Research (IMRA) in 1957 (today's Albert and Suzanne Rakoto Ratsimamanga Foundation). She was IMRA's Chair and Professor of Medicine. IMRA focused on Phytotherapy to use local plants and traditional practices to cure diseases, i.e., traditional pharmacopoeia. IMRA succeeded in using the Syzygium cumini tree as an anti-diabetic agent, and creating alternative medicines against malaria, leprosy, asthma, lithiasis, blood pressure, hepatitis and other common conditions. This has established IMRA as a research centre; however, IMRA's reputation was all but ruined due to the Covid-Organics controversy.

== Awards and honours ==
She was made a Knight of the Legion of Honour on the 12 of July 1996, a Fellow of The World Academy of Sciences (1989), and the African Academy of Sciences (1987). She was the African Academy of Sciences' President of the Scientific Committee in 1992. She was awarded the National Order of Malagasy.

== Death ==
Suzanne died on 16 March 2016 and was buried at Cimetière Parisien de Bagneux.

== See also ==
- Rajaona Andriamananjara
