= Rajaona Andriamananjara =

Malagasy professor of social and economic sciences

Professor Rajaona Andriamananjara FAAS FTWAS
- Born: 1 December 1943; Ambatomena, Madagascar
- Died: September 30, 2016 (aged 72)
- Education: Princeton University; George Washington University; University of Michigan
- Awards: Knight of the National Order of Madagascar
- Scientific career
- Fields: Cultural Sciences, Humanities & Social Sciences
- Institutions: International Monetary Fund

Rajaona Andriamananjara (1 December 1943 – 30 September 2016) was a Malagasy professor of social and economic sciences. He was the founder and director-general of Malagasy Institute of Planning Techniques and also the President of Madagascar's National Academy of Arts, Letters and Sciences (AcNALS).

== Education ==
Andriamananjara was born on 1 December 1943 in Ambatomena, Madagascar. After his bachelor's degree from Princeton University in 1966, Andriamananjara obtained two master's degrees in International Affairs and Economics from George Washington University and University of Michigan in 1967 and 1969 respectively. He received his doctorate from the latter institution in 1971.

== Career ==
Andriamananjara worked as an economist with the International Monetary Fund. He also worked with Madagascar's government as the adviser in the Directorate of Planning, director general of planning in the Ministry of Finance and Planning, and founding director general of the Institute of Madagascar for Techniques of Planning. He was a member of Malagasy Ethics Committee for Science and Technology (CMEST) and the president of Madagascar's National Academy of Arts, Letters and Sciences.

== Death ==
Andriamananjara died of pancreatic cancer on 30 September 2016.

== Awards and honours ==
Andriamananjara was elected as a fellow of African Academy of Sciences in 2006, and the World Academy of Sciences in 2010. He was a member of the Malagasy Ethics Committee for Science and Technology (CMEST) and was the president of Madagascar's National Academy of Arts, Letters and Sciences (2002–2016).

Andriamananjara was awarded the Madagascar Knight of the Order of Merit, and AFGRAD Alumni Awards presented by America Institute of the USA.

== Selected publications ==
- Andriamananjara, R. (1973). Labour Mobilisation in Morocco. The Journal of Modern African Studies, 11(1), 145–151.
- Andriamanerasoa, Nirina, and Rajaona Andriamananjara. "POUR UN DÉVELOPPEMENT AU SERVICE DES MASSES DES PAYS SOUS-DÉVELOPPÉS". Revue Tiers Monde, vol. 18, no. 71, 1977, pp. 481–92. JSTOR
- Rajaona Andriamananjara: Economic Development Cycles In Madagascar, 1950–1990.
