= Romain Bruno Légaré =

Canadian missionary (1925–2020)

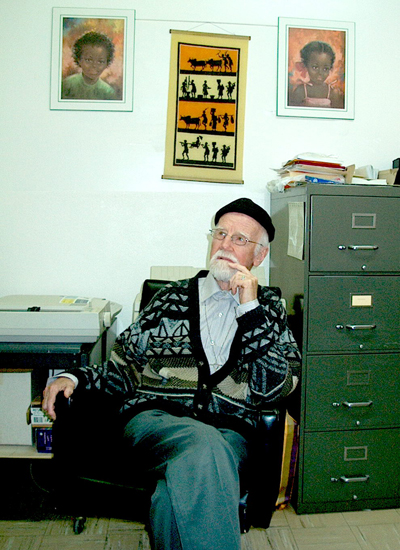
- Légaré in 2009
- Born: 4 June 1925; Princeville, Quebec, Canada
- Died: 30 September 2020 (aged 95); Sherbrooke, Quebec, Canada
- Occupation: Missionary

Romain Bruno Légaré (4 June 1925 – 30 September 2020) was a Canadian missionary. He founded many educational centers in Madagascar.

== Biography ==
Légaré was born in Princeville, Quebec on 4 June 1925, the fifth of nine children of Rosaire Légaré and Alphonsine Perreault. He lived in a peasant farming family. He attended primary school in his rural environment. At the age of 14, he entered the Brothers of the Sacred Heart to help prepare for his entry into normal school. He obtained his diploma in the 1940s and became a religion teacher.

Légaré became a full-time teacher at the age of 20. He then became a missionary, choosing the name "Brother Romain" and decided to "become a missionary, for the kingdom of God, to serve without borders!".

Légaré left for Madagascar in 1950. He settled in Ambalavao, 400 km from Antananarivo. The following year, his superiors brought him to the École Européenne Sacré-Cœur. As head of the school, he opened it to Malagasy students. Also in 1951 after only one year spent in Ambalavao, his superiors brought him back to a school called "École Européenne Sacré-Cœur" (EESC). As head, he opened the doors of the school wide to Malagasy students, which made the EESC, the ESCA, (the Sacré-Cœur School of Antanimena).

Living in a nation ill-prepared for independence, the École du Sacré-Cœur provided a gateway to a university education for many young students. In 1980, Brother Romain was moved to Toliara to do similar work to Ambalavao. He founded the Collège du Sacré-Cœur de Tsianaloky, similar to the École du Sacré-Cœur and contained approximately 3000 students. The Association SacréCœur Omnisports was highly successful in multiple sports, including handball, judo, and others.

Légaré once again moved to Ambatolampy in 2000 at the age of 75. He aided with the village's workshops, the orphanage, farming school, boarding school, and general education college.

Romain Bruno Légaré died on 30 September 2020 in Sherbrooke at the age of 95.

== Distinctions ==
- Grand Cross of the National Order of Madagascar
- Member of the Order of Canada
- Pro Ecclesia et Pontifice
- Officer of the Ordre des Palmes académiques
- Knight of the Legion of Honour
