= Cimetière parisien de Bagneux =

Cemetery in Bagneux, France

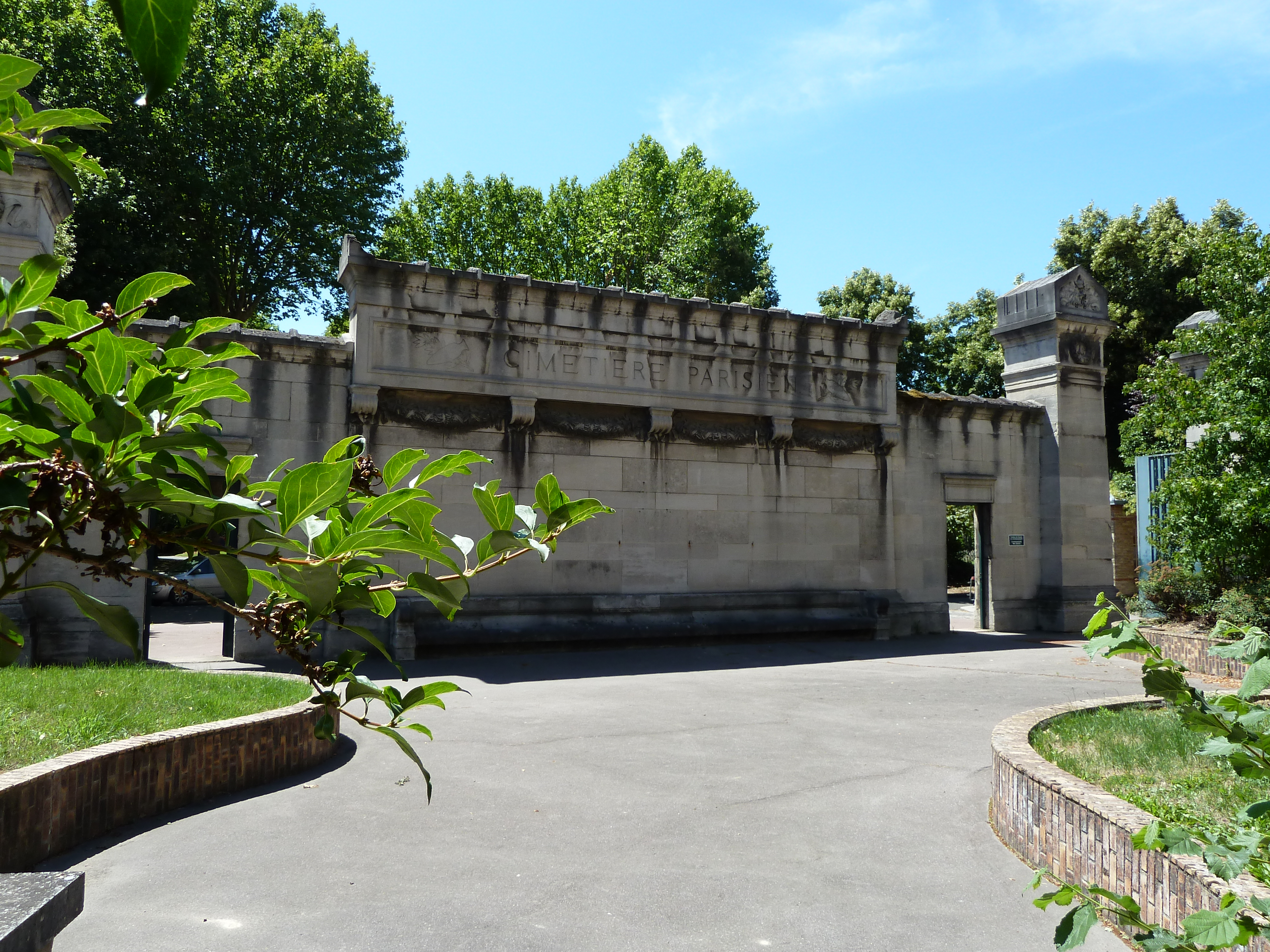
- Entrance of the Cimetière Parisien de Bagneux
- Interactive map of Cimetière parisien de Bagneux

Details
- Established: 1886
- Location: Bagneux
- Country: France
- Coordinates: 48.806°N 2.309°E
- Type: Public (non-denominational)
- Style: Rural
- Owned by: Mairie de Paris
- Size: 61.5 hectares (152 acres)
- No. of graves: 83,000+

Cimetière parisien de Bagneux is one of the three Parisien cemeteries extra muros, located in Bagneux. The cemetery has a large Jewish section (many of the divisions have exclusively Jewish graves) and is sometimes known as the Jewish cemetery.

== History ==
Before the site became a cemetery, it was the scene of heavy fighting in May 1871, in the war between the Versailles and the Fédérés.

The cemetery was opened on 15 November 1886 and is one of the three Parisien Cemeteries extra muros, the others being Cimetière Parisien de Thiais (opened in 1929) and Cimetière Parisien de Pantin. It was opened at the same time as Pantin, (which is northeast of Paris). Both have similar entrances. Bagneux is the smallest of the three cemeteries serving Paris, but the most active.

== Notes ==
The cemetery is still open and there are about 10 burials a day. The cemetery is divided into 115 divisions. It is estimated that there are around 83,000 graves.

The cemetery was the burial place of Oscar Wilde until his remains were moved to Père Lachaise Cemetery in Paris. Similarly, Jeanne Hébuterne, the model and artist who was Amedeo Modigliani's lover and mother of his only child, was originally buried here. Despondent over his death, Jeanne Hébuterne committed suicide and her family interred her at Cimetière de Bagneux until finally relenting and allowing her remains to be transferred to the Père Lachaise Cemetery in 1930 to rest beside Modigliani.

There are nearly 5,500 trees (about 20 different species). It is home to many birds (35 different species have already been counted) and squirrels.

== Notable burials ==
=== Monuments ===
There are monuments for:

- Jews who died in the Second World War (division 1)
- The Warsaw Ghetto (division 115)
- The victims of concentration camps and those who died as a result of "Nazi barbarism". There are many of these monuments in the Jewish divisions.

=== Military graves ===
The cemetery has a number of military sections.

There are two divisions dedicated to the French Military who died in the First and Second World War.

Division 19 contains two sections dedicated to British Commonwealth dead and which are maintained by the Commonwealth War Graves Commission. These plots contain around 35 Commonwealth service war graves of the First World War (mostly British soldiers who died in 1914), and a few from the Second. A notable example was John Wilson (1889–1914), who was a peacetime Scottish professional footballer and died of wounds.

=== Individual burials ===
- Albert Rubin (1887–1956), French/Jewish Painter and Sculptor.
- Yury Annenkov (1889–1974), Russian and French artist known for his book illustrations and portraits.
- Junie Astor (1911–1967), singer
- Eugène Atget (1857–1927), photographer
- Barbara (Monique Serf) (1930–1997), singer
- Claude Berri (1934–2009), French actor, writer, producer, director, and distributor
- María Blanchard (1881–1932), Spanish cubist painter
- Frida Boccara (1940–1996), singer
- Lucienne Boyer (1903–1983), singer
- Martial Brigouleix (1903–1943), military hero
- Charles Bruneau (1883–1969) linguist and philologist
- Francis Carco (1886–1958), writer
- Demetre Chiparus (1886–1947), Romanian sculptor
- Marcel Dalio (1900–1983), actor
- Bella Darvi (1928–1971), French/Polish actress
- Léon Deubel (1879–1913), poet
- Jean-Jacques Gautier (1908–1986), author
- Michèle Girardon (1938–1975), French film actress
- Maadi Gobrait (1904–1980), French Polynesian nurse and resistance fighter
- Gribouille (Marie-France Gaîté) (1941–1968), singer
- Marcelle Henry (1895–1945), one of only six women who were awarded the Compagnon de la Libération
- Alfred Jarry (1873–1907), writer
- Jules Laforgue (1860–1887), poet
- Rose Laurens (1953–2018), singer
- André Leducq (1904–1980), cyclist
- Helene Rytmann (1908–1980), wife of Louis Althusser, a resistance fighter during the second world war, and French communist activist
- Corinne Luchaire (1921–1950), actress
- Georges Madon (1892–1924), French World War I ace
- Jacqueline Maillan (1923–1992), actress
- Alexander Marmorek (1865–1923), bacteriologist
- Jacques Monod (1918–1985), actor
- Mela Muter (Maria Melania Mutermilch) (1876–1967), French/Polish artist
- Jean Paulhan (1884–1968), writer, critic
- Jehan Rictus (1867–1933), poet
- Jules Rimet (1875–1956), founder of the World Cup
- Alexander Salkind (1921–1997), film producer
- Stéphane Sirchis (1959–1999), musician, founder member of French band Indochine
- Pehr Ambjörn Sparre (1828-1921), Swedish inventor and producer of first Swedish postage stamps
- Albert Stopford (1860–1939), an antique dealer who rescued Romanov jewels
- John Wilson (1889–1914), Scottish footballer
- Jean Vigo (1905–1934), film director

== Location ==
Located to the southwest of the city of Paris, France, the main entrance to the Cimetière de Bagneux is located at 43–45, Avenue Marx-Dormoy, in Bagneux, Hauts-de-Seine. There are two smaller entrances: Porte de Fontenay on Avenue Jean-Jaurès (near the junction with Avenue Marx-Dormoy) and Porte de Bagneux on Rue de l'Égalité (near the junction with Avenue de Garlande).

The cemetery is located next to the small local (communal) cemetery.

== Public transport ==
The Cimetière de Bagneux is a short walk from the Châtillon – Montrouge station, which can be reached by taking line 13.

The Cimetière de Bagneux is also served by bus lines 68, 128, and 323.

There is a Vélib' station at Rue Molière (21209).

== Gallery ==
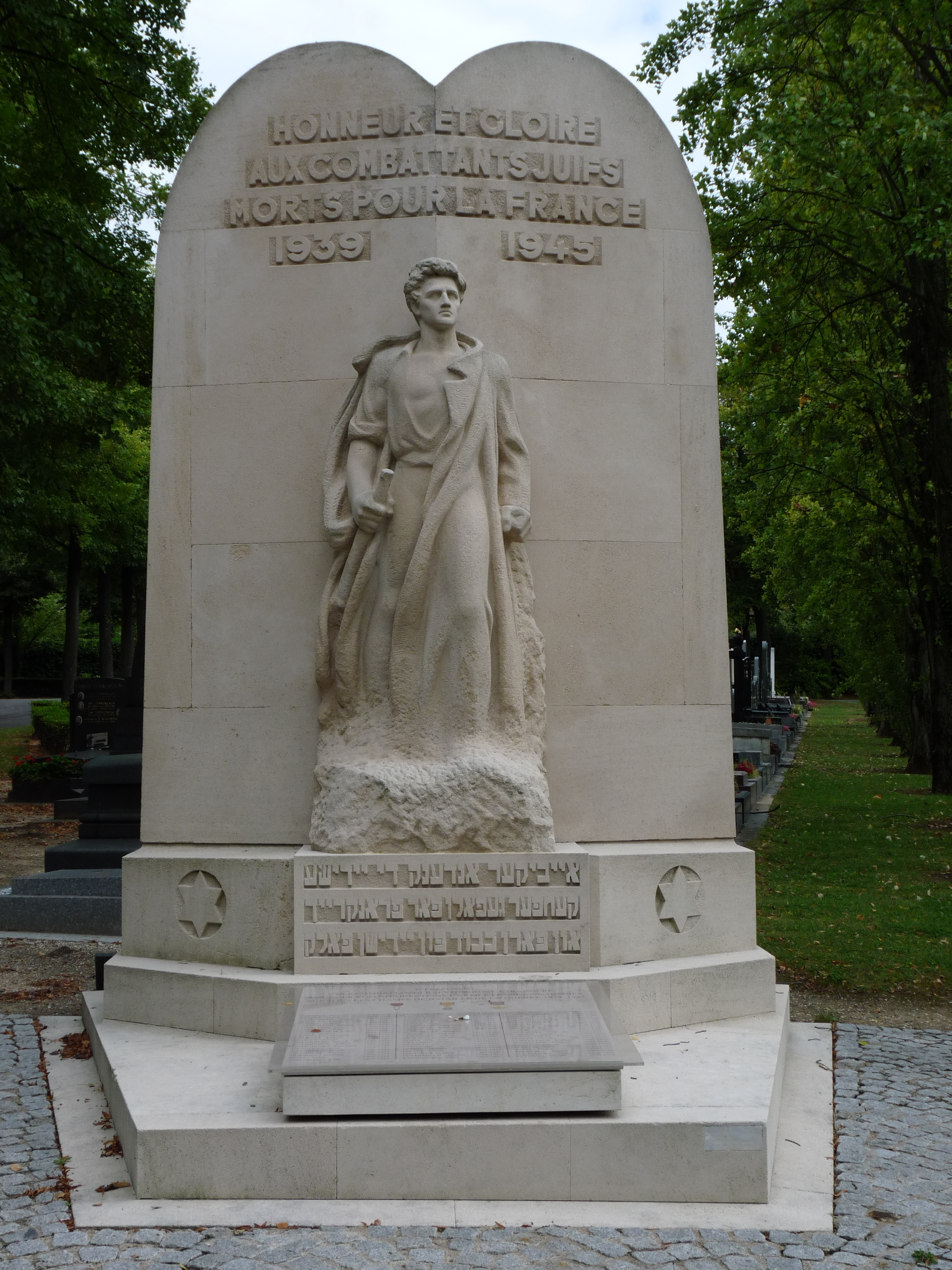
The Jewish War Memorial

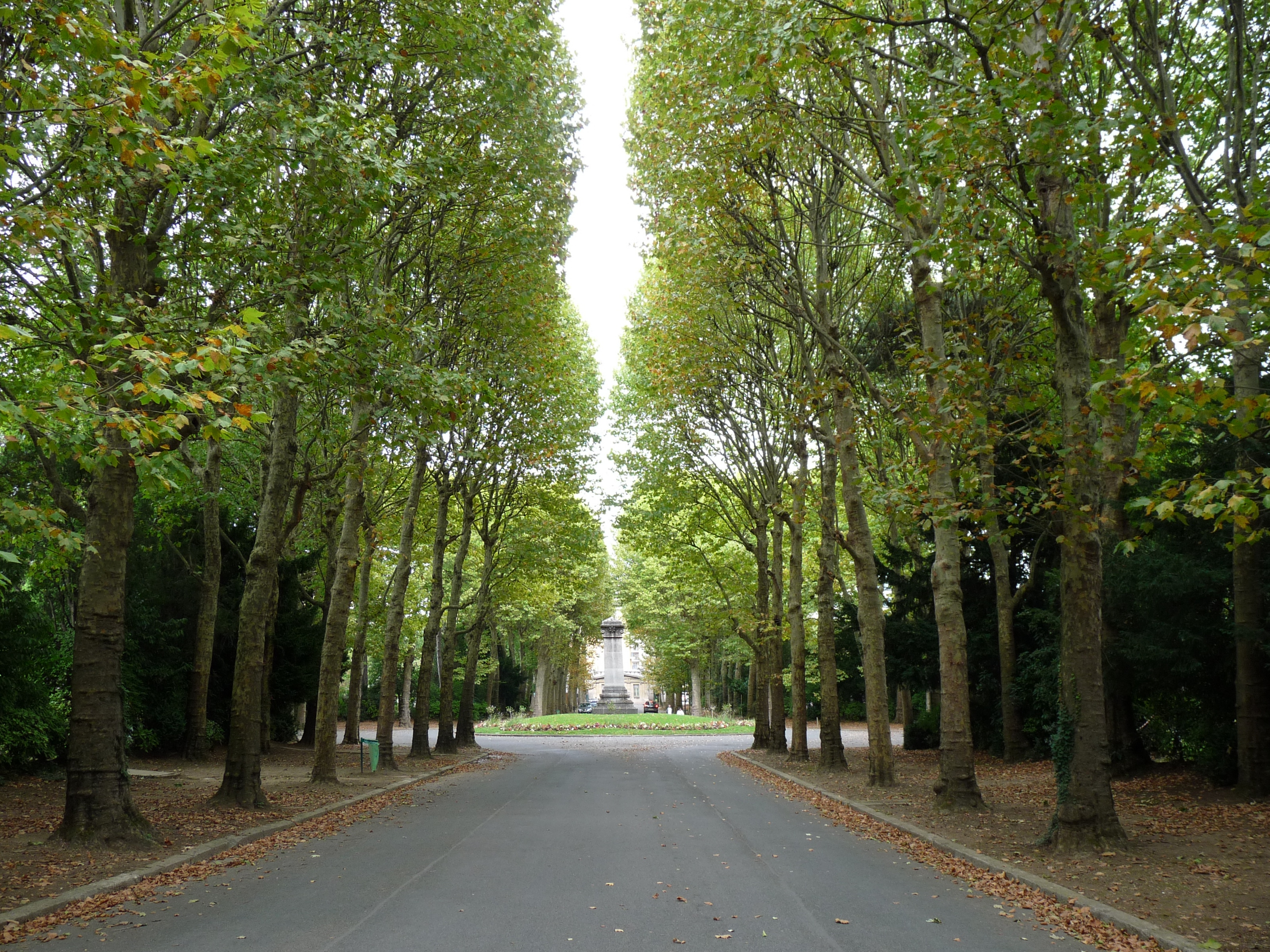
View of the central avenue

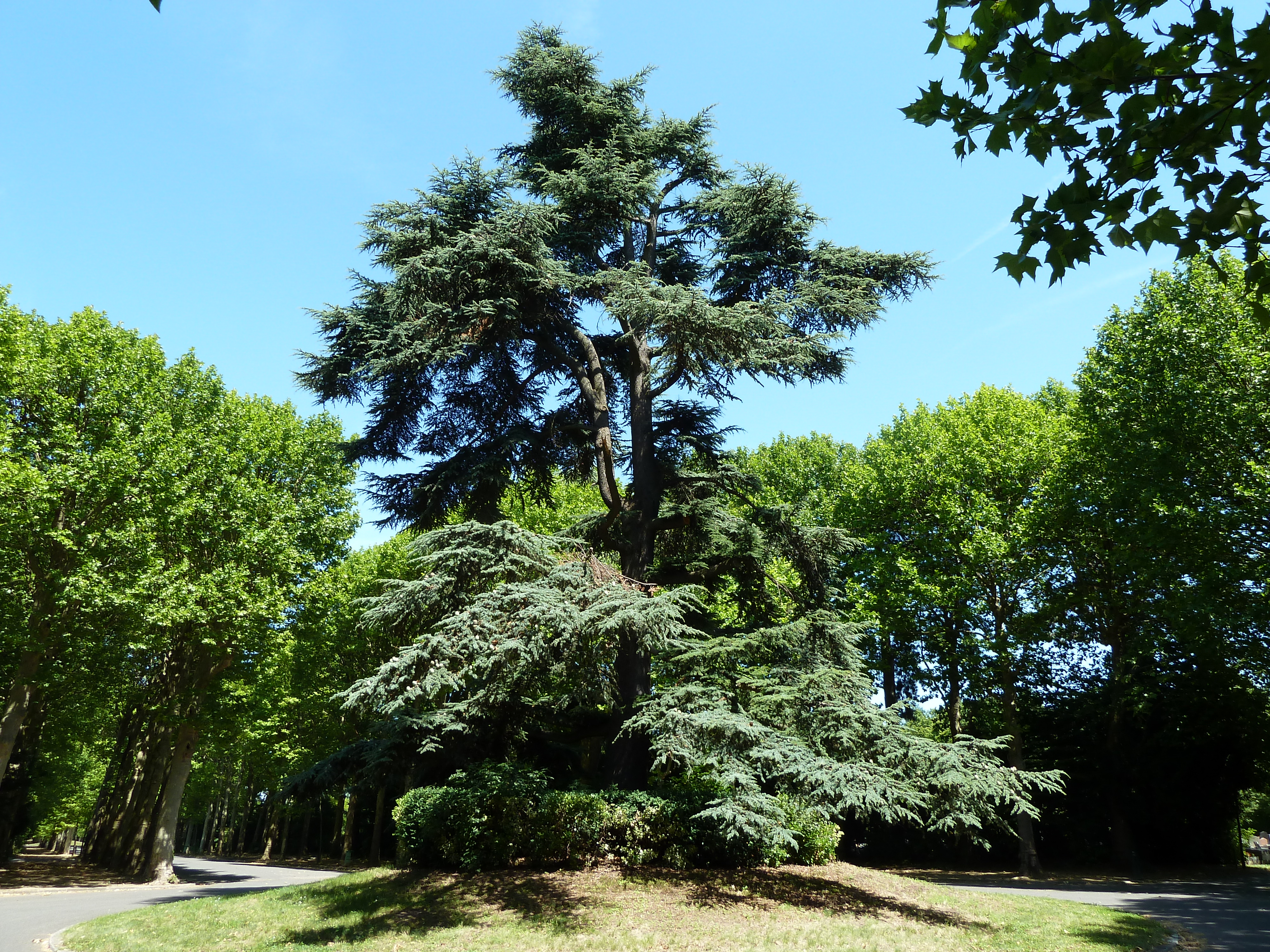
A cedar of Lebanon

== External sources ==
- Adapted (in part) from the article Cimetière de Bagneux, from Wikinfo, licensed under the GNU Free Documentation License.
