= Maadi Gobrait =

French Nurse and Resistance Fighter

Maadi Gobrait (7 August 1904 — 9 September 1980) was a French Polynesian nurse and a resistance fighter.

Gobrait was born in Papeete and studied in New Zealand, before returning to Tahiti. It was the place where she heard the call of 18 June 1940 and, refusing the armistice, became one of the first people to enlist in the Free French Forces. Incorporated into the health corps, she was a part of its campaigns in North Africa, Italy and France. She ended the war at the rank of second lieutenant, being decorated with the Croix de Guerre.

On her return to Polynesia, she became a nurse major at the hospital in Papeete, and later the head of social services. A very close friend of the de Gaulle couple, she suggested Charles de Gaulle his trip to the Pacific in 1956, a trip during which he was welcomed by Walter Grand, a veteran of the Pacific Battalion who had become the president of the Territorial Assembly.

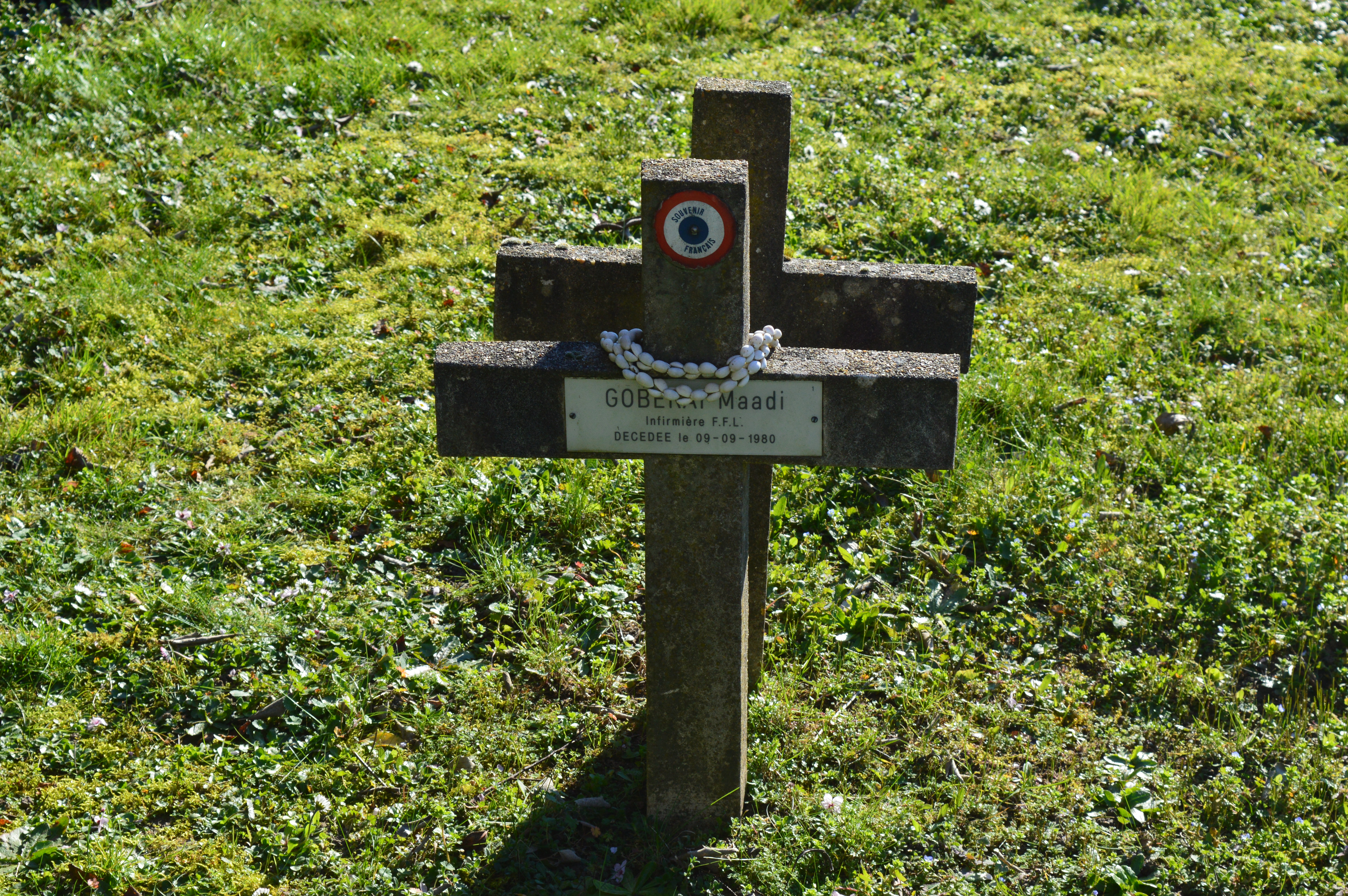
Grave of Maadi Gobrait in the Cimetière parisien de Bagneux.

At the end of her life, when her health was declining, she was hospitalized in Val-de-Grâce where she died on 9 September 1980 in the same bed as Yvonne de Gaulle did (who died a year earlier), fulfilling her wishes. She is buried in the cemetery of Bagneux, in the 40th division (a military square dedicated to the dead and veterans of the two world wars).

She remains a respected figure in French Polynesia to this day.

== Decorations and distinctions ==
- Officer of the Legion of Honor (1967; Knight in 1956)
- Croix de guerre (1939–1945)
- Resistance Medal

A street in Papeete is named after her, not far from the High Commission of the Republic. On 6 March 2020, the OPT of French Polynesia issued a stamp bearing her image.
