= Albert Rubin =

Israeli artist (1887–1956)

- אלברט רובין
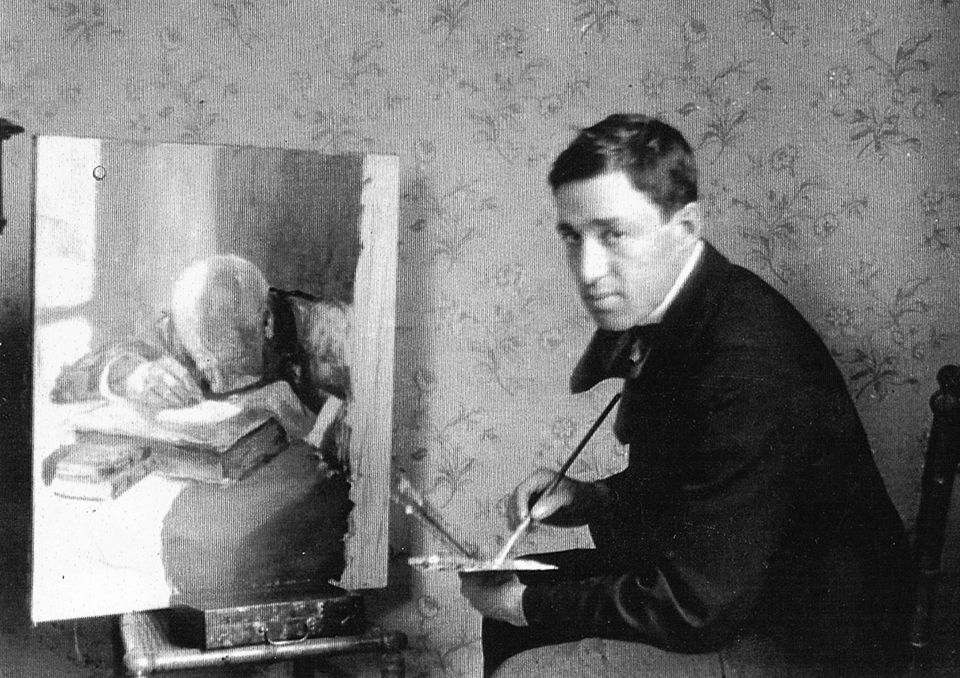
- Albert Rubin Painting James Sanua 1910
- Born: Avraham Rubin; 10 July 1887; Sofia, Bulgaria
- Died: 31 May 1956 (aged 68); Paris, France
- Resting place: Cimetière parisien de Bagneux
- Education: The Bezalel Academy of Art and Design in Jerusalem, Ecole des Beaux-Arts
- Occupations: painter, Sculptor and artist
- Website: www.albertrubin.com

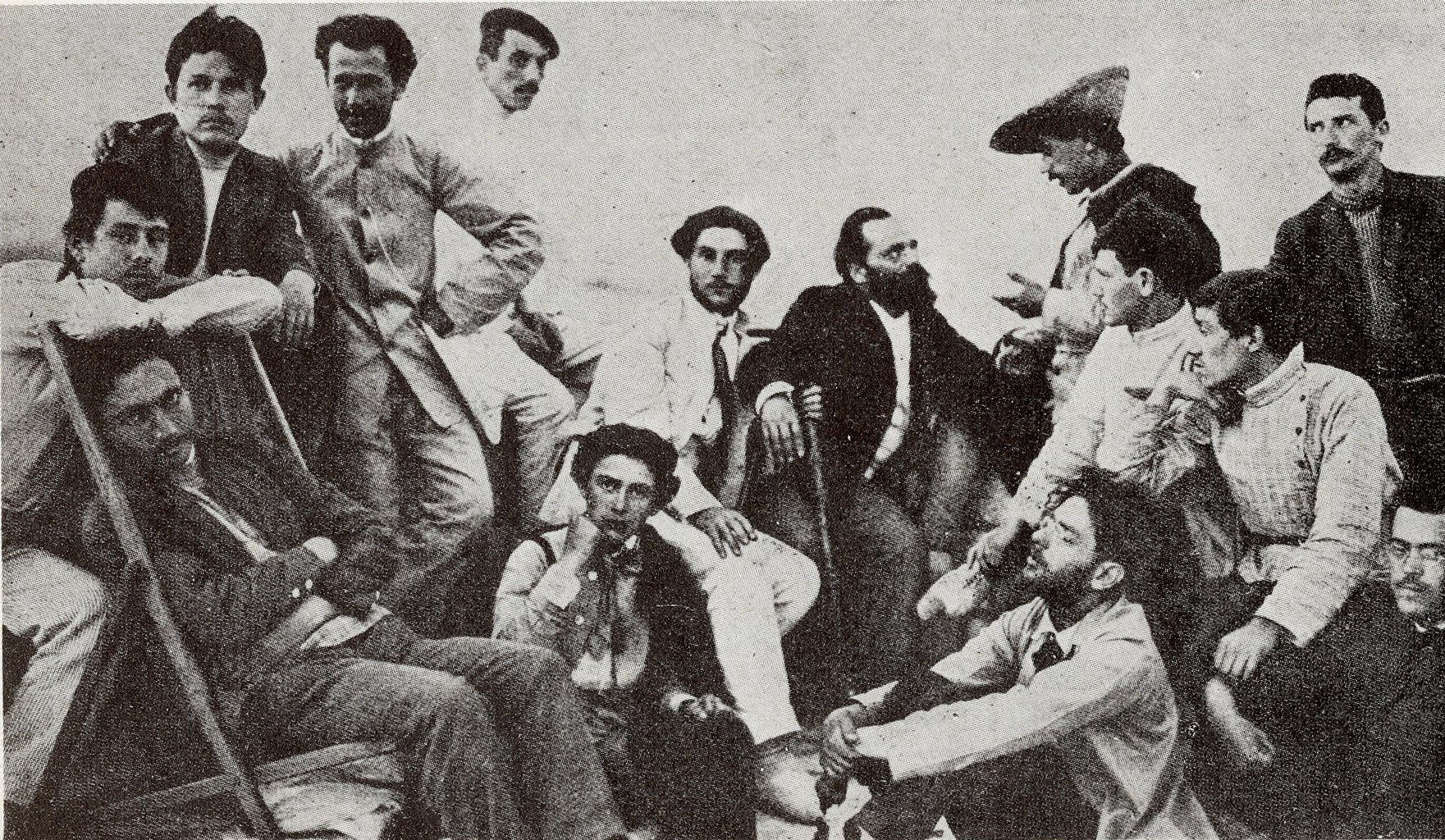
Class of Bezale, 1906 (Albert Rubin sitting second from the right)

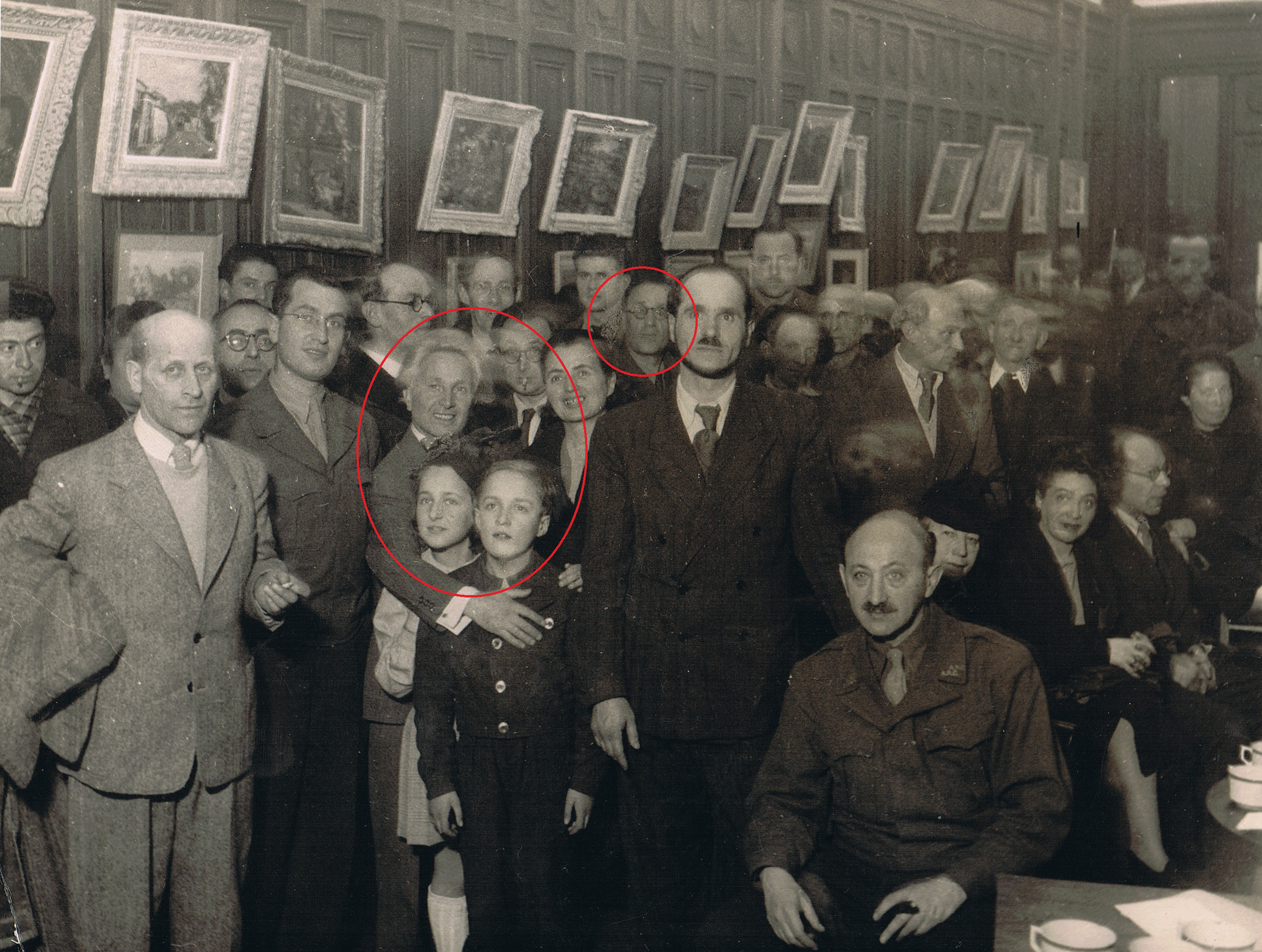
Albert Rubin (in circle on the right), with Emmanuel Mane-Katz (on the left circle, hugging Rubin's children)

Albert Rubin (Hebrew: אלברט רובין; 10 July 1887 – 31 May 1956) was a Bulgarian-born Jewish painter, sculptor, graphic artist and illustrator. He was selected for the first class of Bezalel Art School, and later established his artistic career in Paris, where he lived and presented his work.

== Biography ==
Albert (Avraham) Rubin was born in Sofia, the capital of Bulgaria. His father, Nissim Rubin, who mastered several languages, worked as an interpreter for tourists and diplomats. He had two brothers and three sisters. To help support the family, Rubin left school to become a carpenter's apprentice. In his free time, he sculpted in wood. In 1903, urged by Boris Schatz, a family friend and the "father of Israeli art", he began studying painting and sculpture at the National Academy of Art in Sofia. When Theodor Herzl visited Sofia, Rubin was commissioned to paint his portrait.

In 1905, the Seventh Zionist Congress in Basel reached a decision to establish an art school in Palestine. A group of thirty young artists from all over Europe were to be selected to form the first class. Rubin, then 19 years old, applied and was immediately accepted.

Rubin attended Bezalel for three years, 1906–1909, returned briefly to Bulgaria, and then moved to Paris, where he studied at the Ecole des Beaux-Arts until 1917. Meanwhile, his mother died, and the family joined him in Paris. His father, who worked as night watchman, died in a work accident in January 1914, leaving Rubin to care for his five siblings.

During World War I, he served in the French army, teaching art to Belgian and French soldiers. In 1931, he was accidentally blinded in one eye but continued to paint.

In 1933, he married and had two children, a daughter, Sylvia, and a son, Claude. During World War II, when the Nazis invaded France, he was forced to go into hiding for long periods of time. After the war, Rubin helped found the Association of Jewish Artists and Sculptors in France.

in May 1956, when he was 68, Rubin was hit by a car in Paris and died of his injuries. He was buried in Cimetiere parisien de Bagneux in a family plot beside his father. His daughter Sylvia Chetrit immigrated to Israel in 1969.

== Art career ==
In early 1906, Rubin and his family arrived to Jerusalem. He began his studies in Bezalel Art School on 1 March 1906. He was placed in an advanced class. [ Among his teachers were Ephraim Moses Lilien and Samuel Hirszenberg. He painted and sculpted the landscapes of the land of Israel, especially the ones of Jerusalem. Several of his sculptures remained at Bezalel, among them two busts of children for which he used his younger brothers as models.

In the fall of 1909, he left for Paris to continue his art education. To make ends meet he sold all the paintings he had brought with him and began to work as a street artist, creating sidewalk drawings in chalk. He was accepted at the Ecole des Beaux Arts in Paris and received a scholarship, thanks to the intervention of Baron Rothschild. One of his first teachers was Fernand Cormon. He was a candidate for the Prix de Rome, but turned out to be ineligible because he was not a French citizen. He was invited to join the staff of Athenee de France, a respected art magazine, after exhibiting his dual portrait of Sheikh Abu-Nadra (pen name of Yaqub Sanu, an Egyptian Jewish playwright and journalist).

After serving in the French army in World War I, he received French citizenship. He was accepted to the Societe des Artistes Francais in 1914. From then on, he exhibited his work at its annual exhibition, Salon des Artistes Francais, and was lauded in the newspapers for his pastels and oils. Later, he became a sought-after portrait painter, noted for his unique style.

== Gallery ==
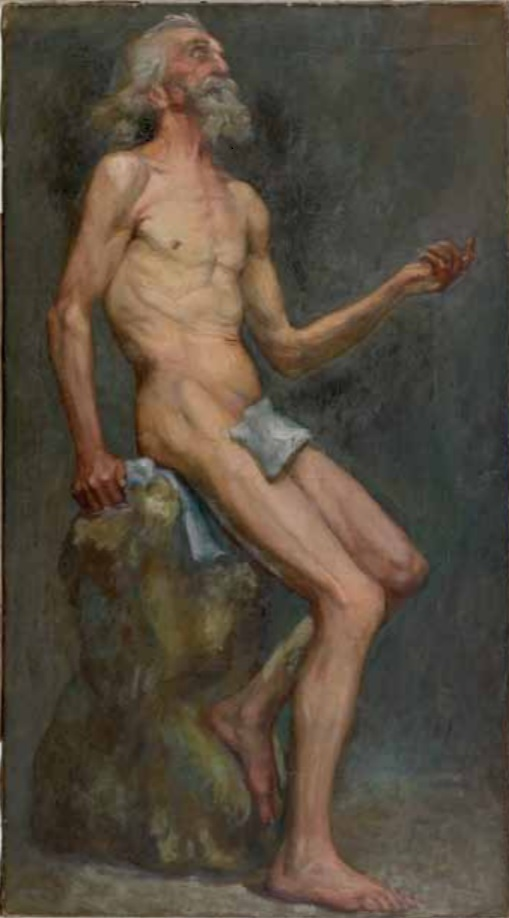
Job,
oil on canvas,
45X81,
purchased by the Tel Aviv Museum

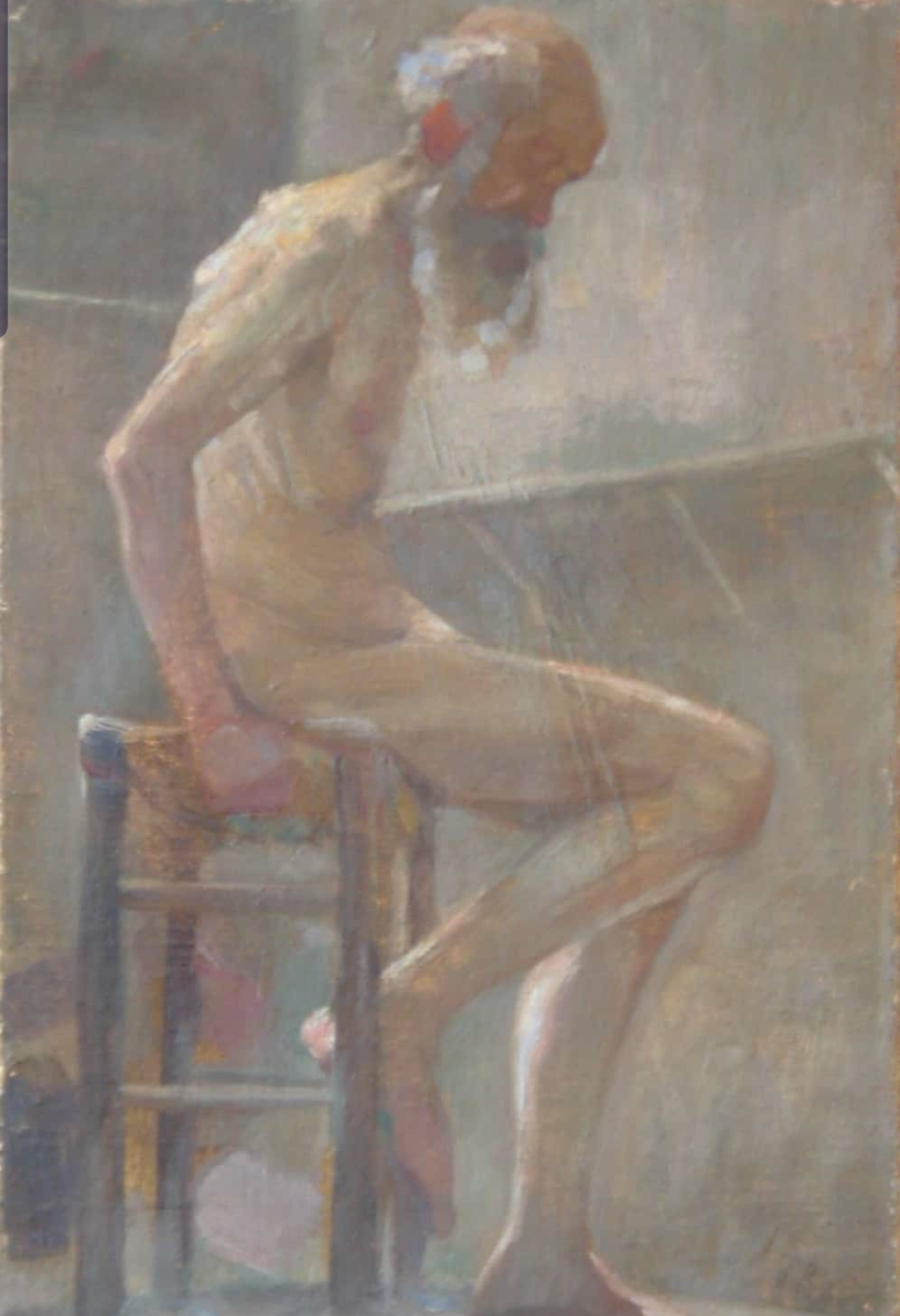
Nude model,
oil on canvas,
32X21

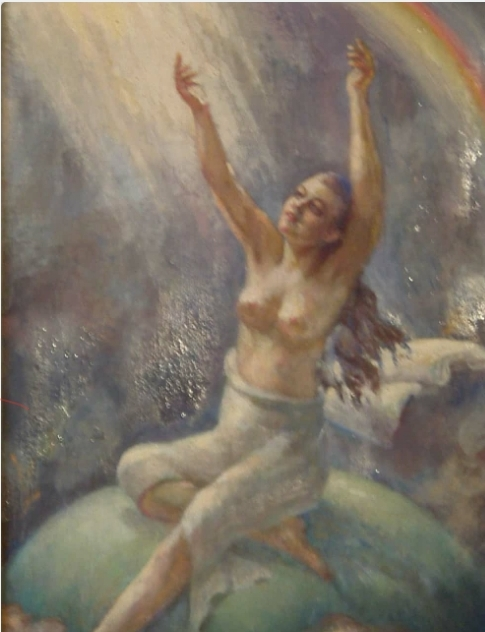
Peace of Mankind, 1940,
oil on wood,
46.5X30

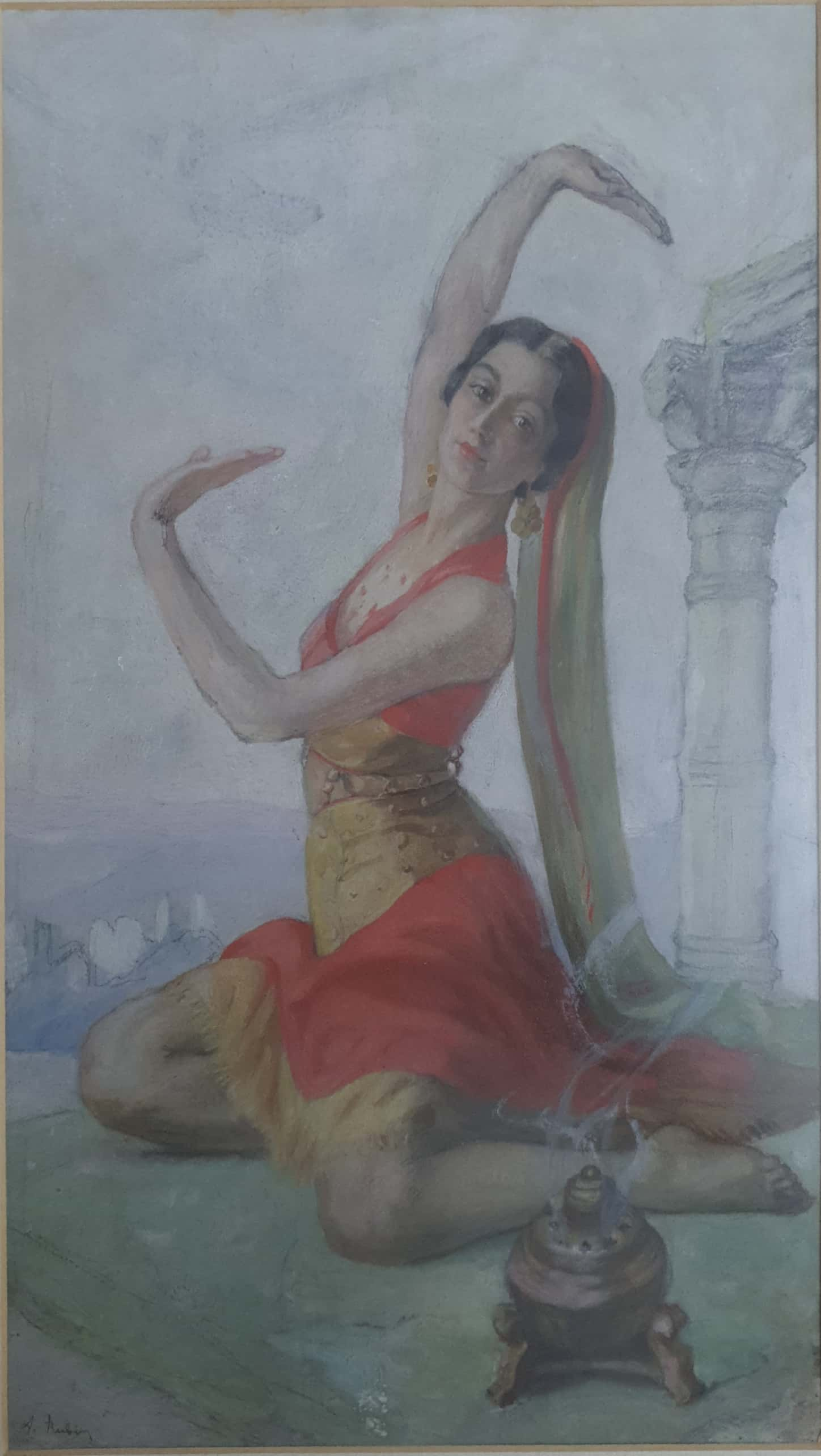
The Indian dancer,
watercolor on cardboard,
43X26
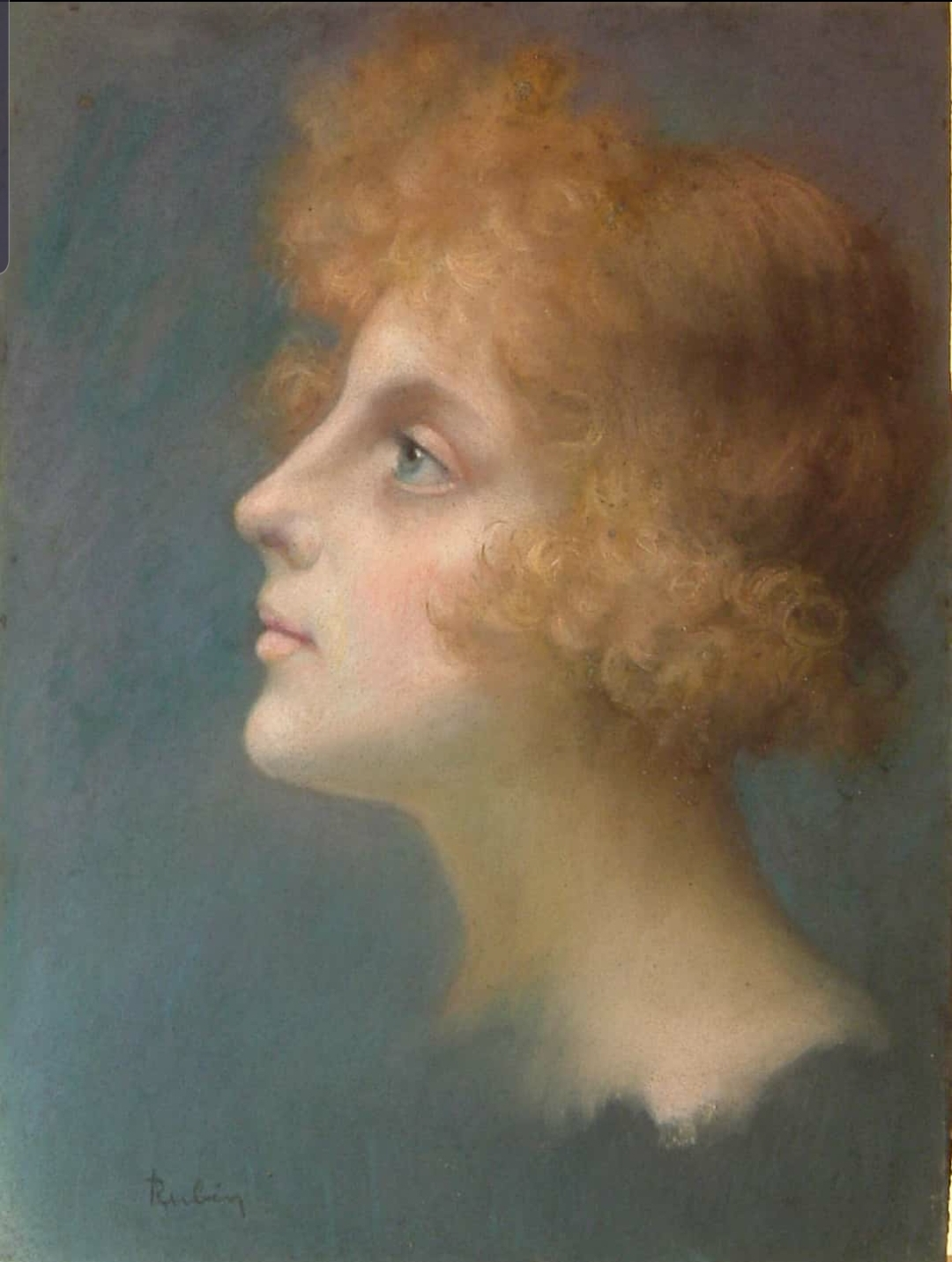
Portrait of a redheaded woman in profile, 1935,
Pastel on cardboard,
39.5X30

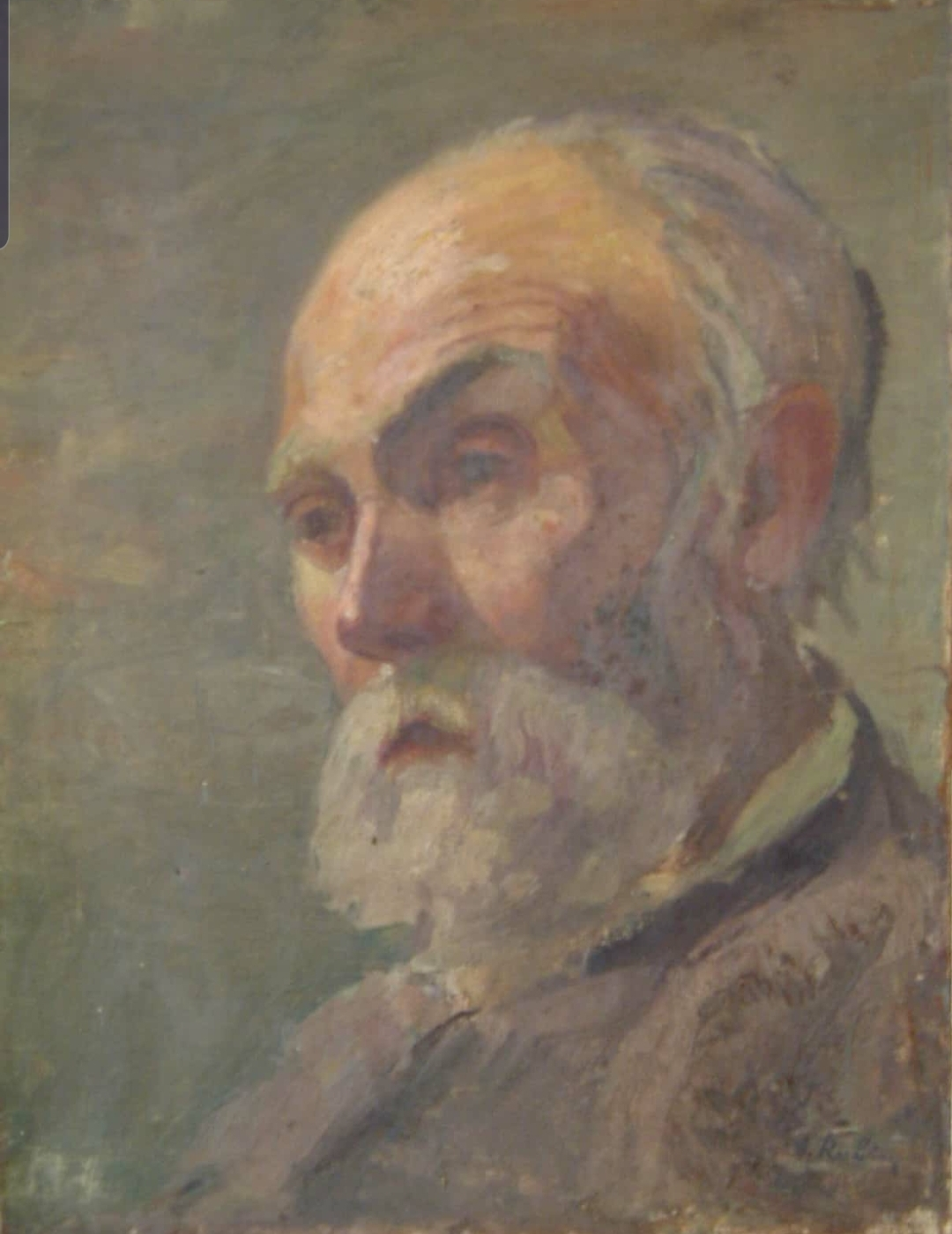
Portrait of an older man,
oil on canvas,
35X27

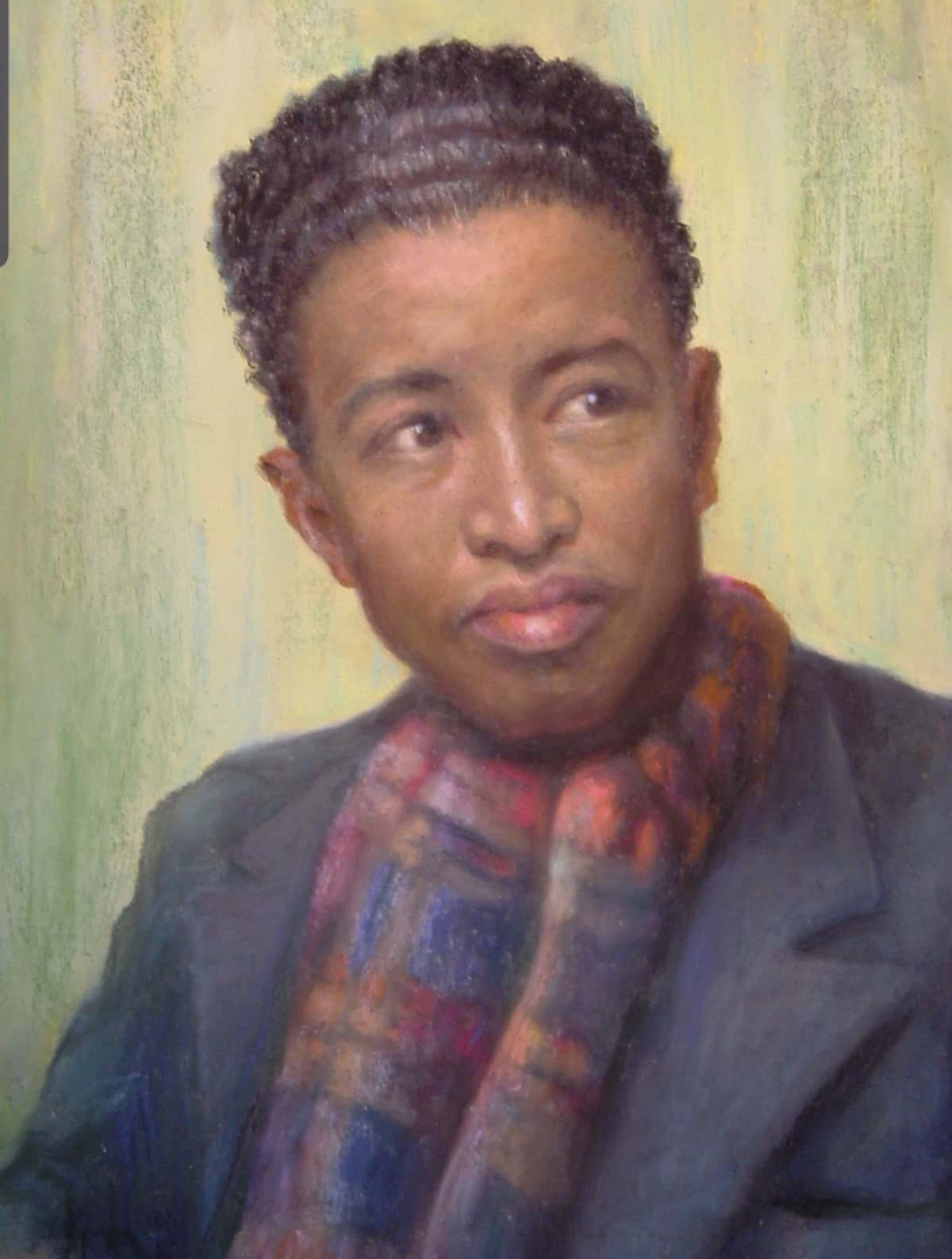
Portrait of Mr. R from Madagascar, 1951,
watercolor on cardboard,
56.5X47

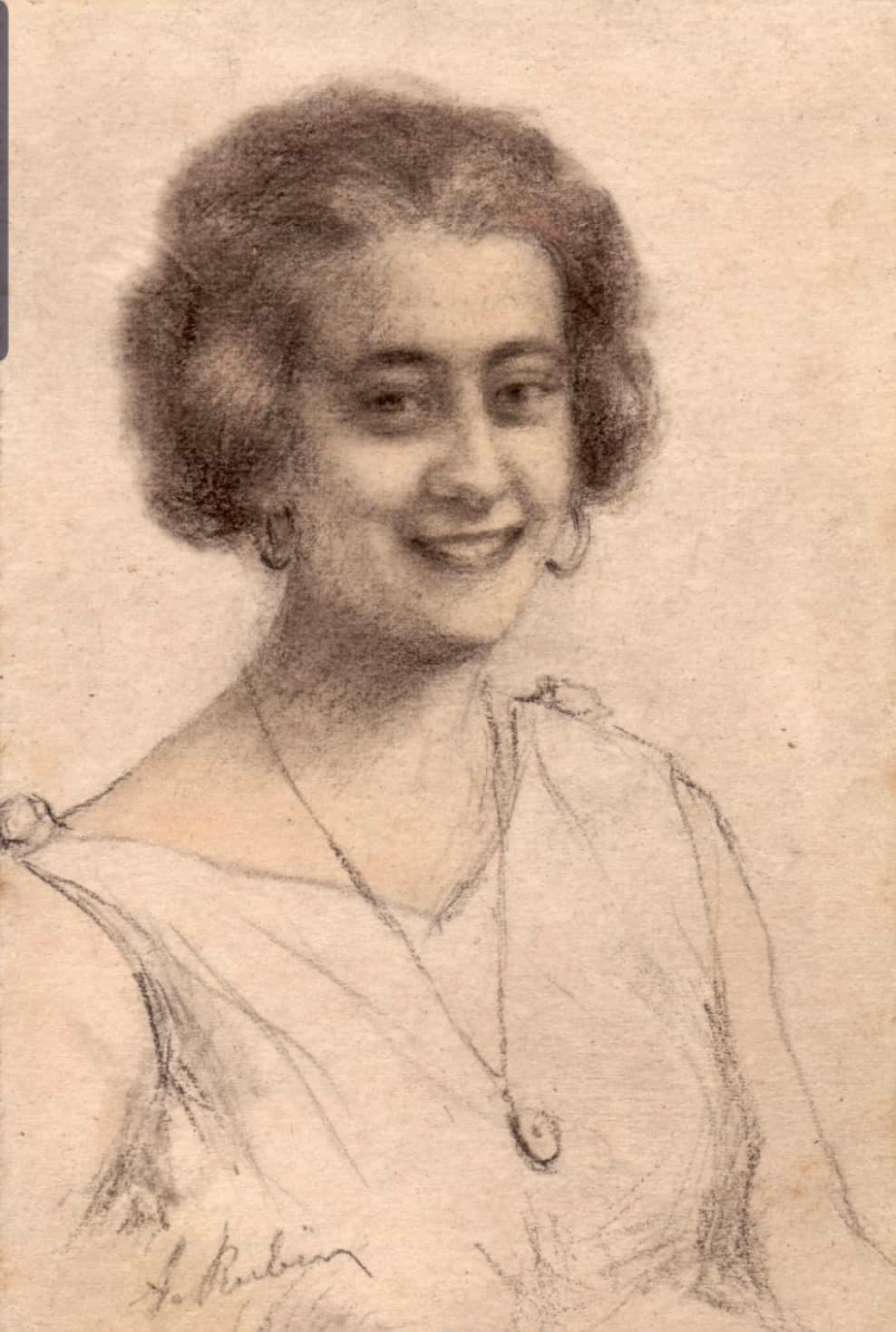
The woman with the pendant,
Crayons on paper,
13.5X8.5
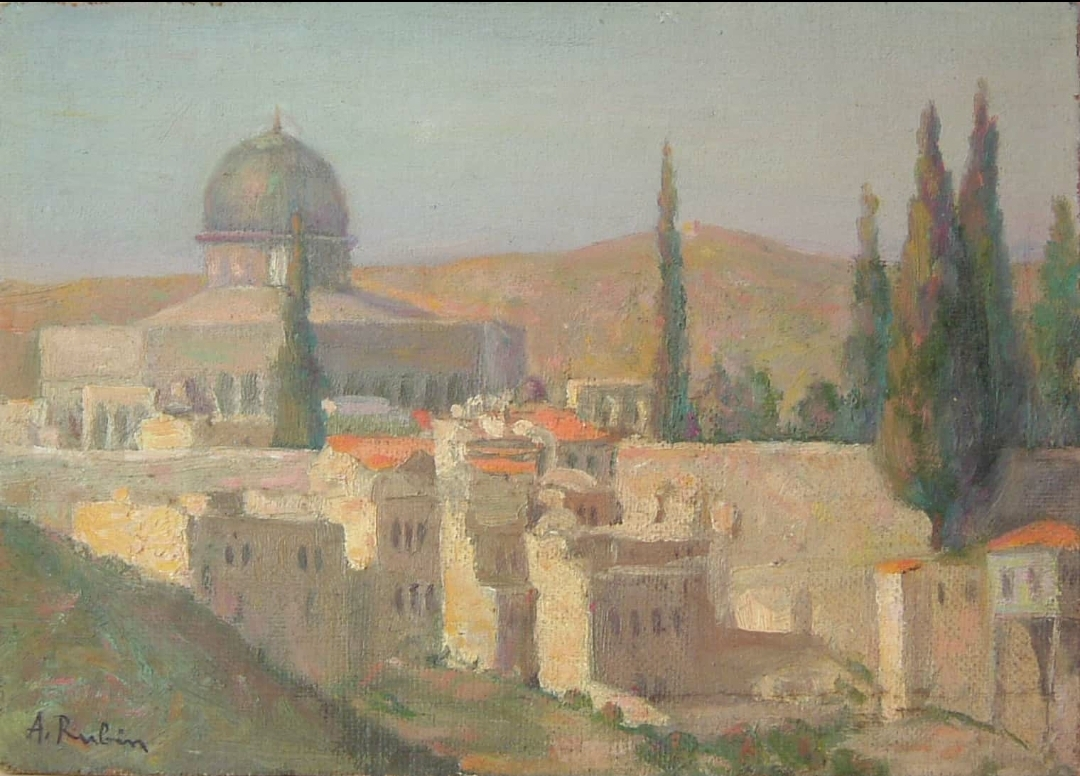
Al-Aqsa Mosque, 1906,
oil on wood,
61X46

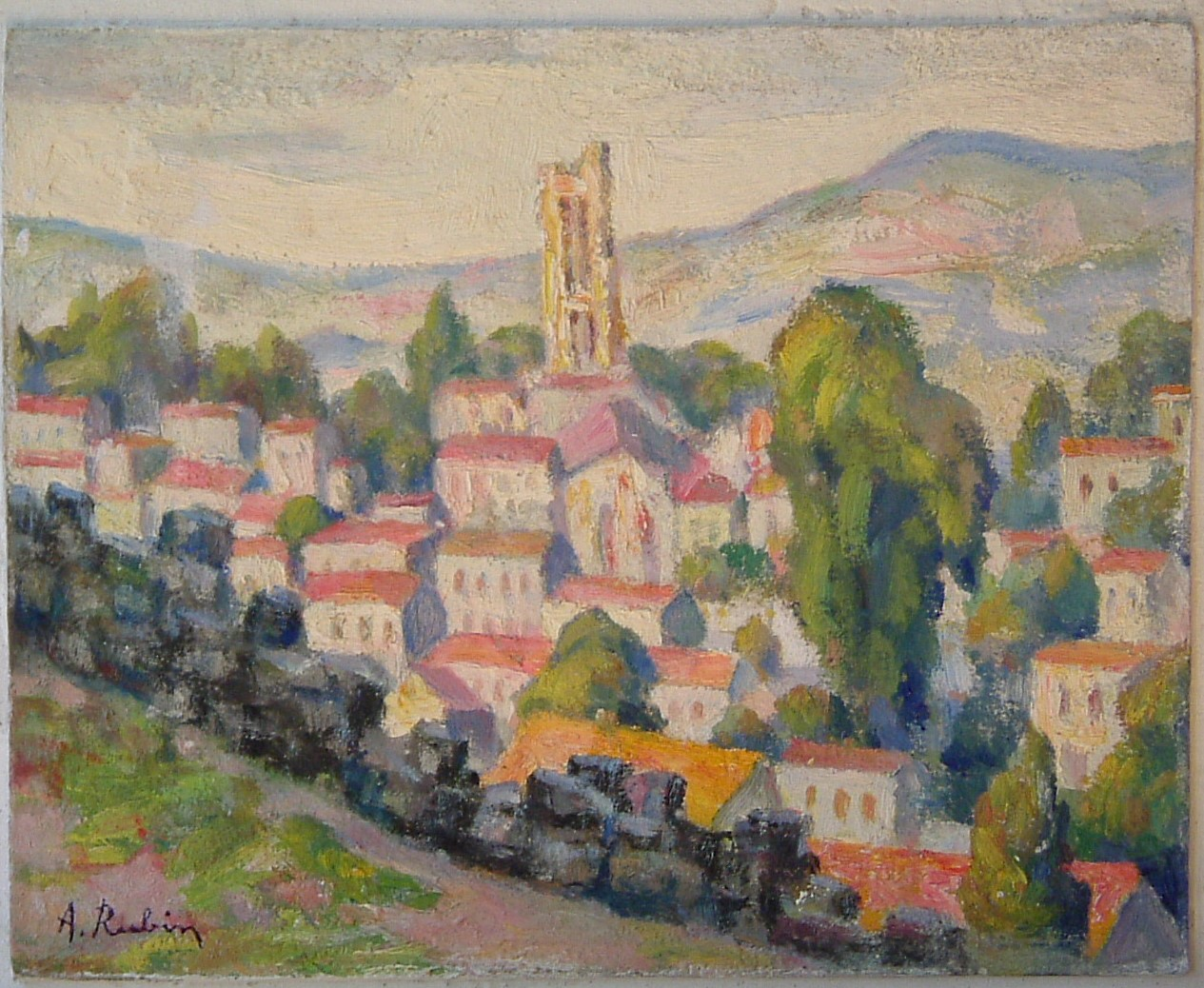
French village, 1936,
oil on cardboard,
24X19

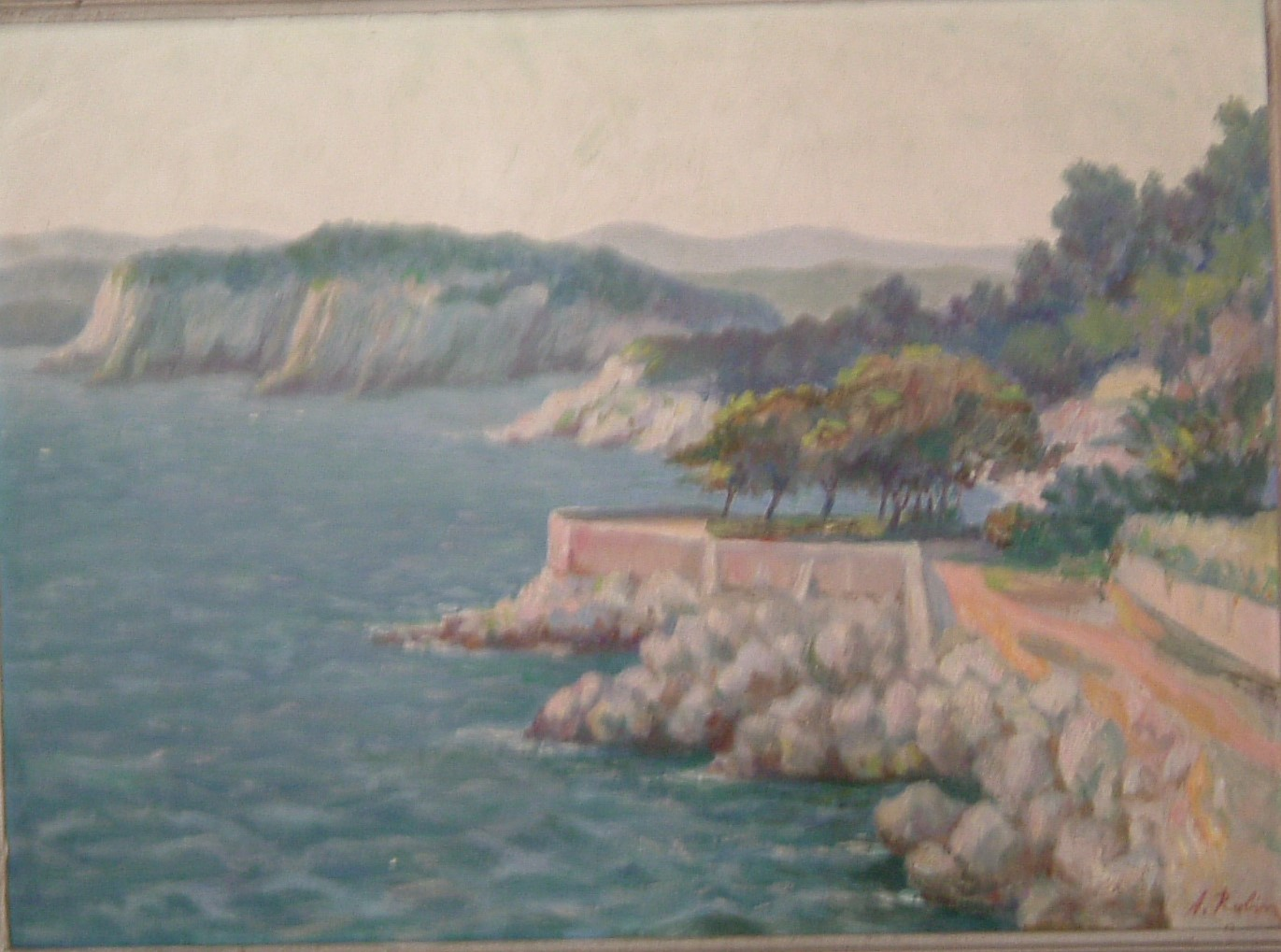
Port in Nice France, 1930,
oil on cardboard,
76X56

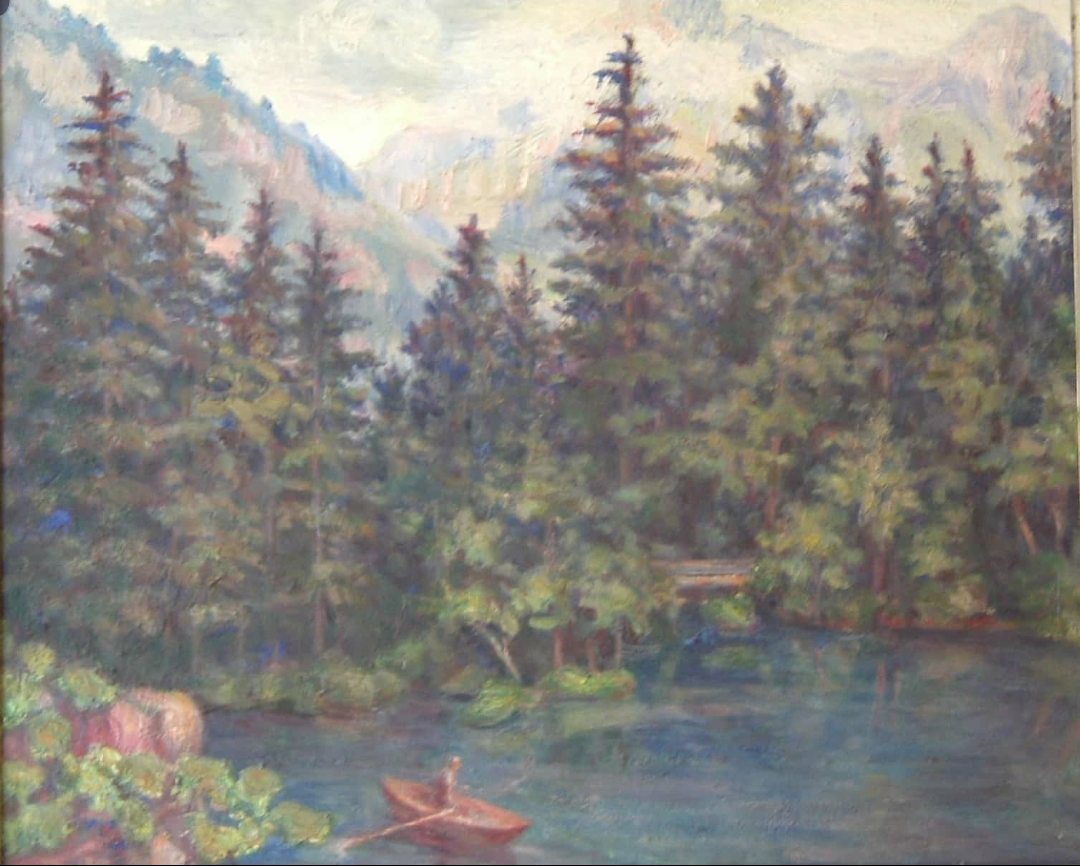
The Blue Lake in Switzerland, 1936,
oil on cardboard,
61.5X50.5

== Awards and recognition ==
In 1933 and 1950, Rubin was awarded prizes at the Salon des Artistes Francais, an annual exhibition of French artists in Paris. A retrospective of his work was held at the Mishkan Museum of Art at Kibbutz Ein Harod in June–August 2010.

== See also ==
- Visual arts in Israel
