= Marcelle Henry =

French civil servant

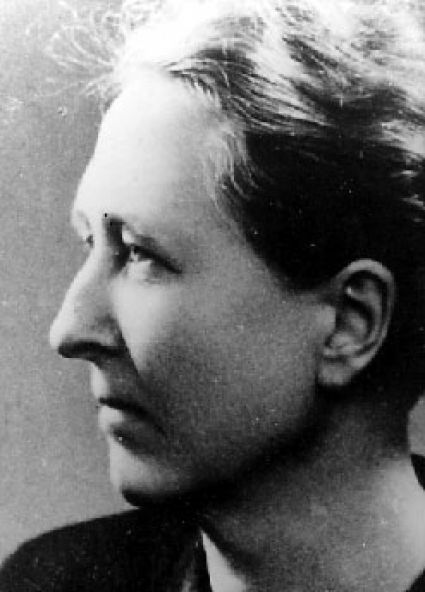
- Marcelle Henry
- Born: 7 September 1895; Angers, France
- Died: 24 April 1945 (aged 49); Paris, France
- Burial place: Bagneux, France
- Military career
- Allegiance: France
- Branch: French Resistance
- Service years: 1940–1945
- Rank: Sous-lieutenant
- Unit: Bureau central de renseignements et d'action
- Conflicts: Second World War
- Awards: Chevalier de la Légion d'honneur Compagnon de la Libération. Croix de guerre 1939-1945

Marcelle Marguerite Henry (7 September 1895 – 24 April 1945) was a French civil servant and a member of the French Resistance during the Second World War.

== Early life ==
Marcelle Henry was born at Angers. Her father was the local Inspector of Public Works who died before the First World War. She went to school in Limoges, before later attending the Lycée Victor-Duruy collage in Paris, where she obtained her baccalauréat. During the First World War, she taught at a boys' school in Châtillon-sur-Seine and later at Langres.

== Career ==
In 1919, Marcelle Henry went to work at the Ministry of Labour, as her father had done before her. Her mother died in 1925, leaving Marcelle to look after her brother Victor, who was chronically ill and unable to work. By 1931 she was deputy head of a department, and in 1937 she was put in charge of the office that dealt with the health and safety of workers, still within the Ministry of Labour.

In June 1940, she began organising resistance to the German occupation from within her workplace. At her home in Athis-Mons, she produced and stored pamphlets for distribution to workers; she also sheltered refugees. In 1943 she entered the "Forces Françaises Combattantes", joining the Bureau Central de Renseignements et d'Action (B.C.R.A), where she worked under Henri Levin.

In 1942, while working at the ministry, she wrote a short book on the subject of unemployment, focusing largely on female workers.

On 4 July 1944, she was arrested by the Gestapo at her Paris home for questioning as to the whereabouts of one of her political contacts, Jacques Mitterrand. While an inmate at Fresnes Prison, she was awarded the rank of Sous-lieutenant within the Forces Françaises Combattantes.

She was sentenced to death but was sent instead to Ravensbrück concentration camp in August. From then she was sent to Torgau, a subsidiary of Buchenwald concentration camp. Although repatriated in April 1945, she died shortly afterwards as a result of the ill-treatment she had received while in captivity. She was one of only six women recognised among the "Compagnons of the Liberation", and one of four of that group that were posthumously recognised. She is buried at the cemetery of Bagneux, Paris.
