= John Wilson (footballer, born 1889) =

Scottish footballer

Personal information
- Date of birth: 1889
- Place of birth: Blackford, Scotland
- Date of death: 20 September 1914 (aged 25)
- Place of death: Paris, France
- Position: Half back

Senior career*
Years	Team	Apps	(Gls)
1912–1913	Dumbarton	11	(3)
1913–1914	Vale of Leven	13	(1)
- * Club domestic league appearances and goals

John Wilson (1889 – 20 September 1914) was a Scottish professional footballer who played in the Scottish League for Vale of Leven and Dumbarton as a half back.

== Personal life ==
Wilson was married. After the outbreak of the First World War in August 1914, he enlisted as a private in The Black Watch (Royal Highlanders) in Auchterarder. Wilson died of wounds at the Hotel Majestic Military Hospital in Paris on 20 September 1914 and was buried in the Cimetière parisien de Bagneux.

== Career statistics ==
Appearances and goals by club, season and competition
Club	Season	League			Scottish Cup		Total	
Club	Season	Division	Apps	Goals	Apps	Goals	Apps	Goals
Dumbarton	1912–13	Scottish Second Division	11	3	0	0	11	3
Vale of Leven	1913–14	Scottish Second Division	13	1	3	0	16	1
Career total			24	4	3	0	27	4
