= Albert Rakoto Ratsimamanga =

Malagasy physician and biochemist and diplomat (1907-2001)

Professor Albert Rakoto Ratsimamanga FAAS FTWAS
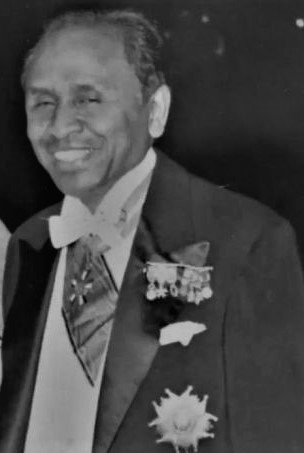
- Ratsimamanga in 1972

Malagasy ambassador to France
- In office 1960–1972

Malagasy ambassador to China and USSR
- In office 1972–1974

Personal details
- Born: 28 December 1907 Antananarivo, French Madagascar
- Died: 16 September 2001 (aged 93) Antananarivo, Madagascar
- Citizenship: Madagascar, France
- Spouse: Suzanne Urverg-Ratsimamanga
- Scientific career
- Education: University of Antananarivo; University of Paris; Pasteur Institute
- Awards: Man of the Century, Madagascar; Grand Cross, Madagascar; Order of Merit of the Federal Republic of Germany; Legion of Honour, France; National Order of the Lion, Senegal; Ordre des Palmes académiques Order of Merit, Congo - Brazzaville; Ordre national du Mérite, France; Grand Prize, Royal Academy for Overseas Sciences
- Fields: Nutraceutical; Pharmacopoeia; Herbal medicine
- Workplaces: French National Centre for Scientific Research; Malagasy Institute of Applied Research; UNESCO; FAO

Albert Rakoto Ratsimamanga (28 December 1907 – 16 September 2001) was a Malagasy physician, biochemist and diplomat. Born into a disgraced royal family; Ratsimamanga trained as a doctor of exotic medicine in French Madagascar and France, where he pioneered modern nutraceuticals. Ratsimamanga returned to Madagascar and, with his wife, Suzanne Urverg-Ratsimamanga, in 1957, established the Malagasy Institute of Applied Research which specialised in herbal medicine.

While in France, Ratsimamanga was involved in Madagascar's independence efforts, and after independence, he became the Malagasy Republic's first ambassador to France and helped shape its foreign affairs. Ratsimamanga is considered one of Madagascar's most renowned scholars and bestowed upon him the highest orders of merits nationally and internationally. He was also one of the founders of The World Academy of Sciences (1983) and the African Academy of Sciences (1985), and was selected Madagascar's Man of the Century.

== Early life and education ==
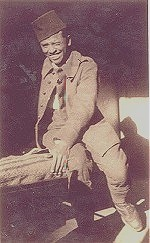
Young Ratsimamanga ca. 1924

Albert Rakoto Ratsimamanga was born on 28 December 1907, in Antananarivo, Madagascar, to Razanadrakoto Ratsimamanga and Lala Ralisoa. He was the grandson of Prince Ratsimamanga, uncle and advisor to Queen Ranavalona III, who was executed in 1897 at the beginning of the French colonisation of Madagascar. When Albert was only eleven years old, his father died in 1918 from heavy drinking.

He received his early education at the Faculty of Medicine, University of Antananarivo, until he became a doctor of Indigenous Medicine in 1924. Ratsimamanga was a member of the Malagasy delegation to the 1930 Colonial Exhibition in Paris, during which he decided to join the University of Paris to become a Doctor of Science (MS) and a Doctor of Medicine (MD). He also graduated from the Institute of Exotic Medicine and the Pasteur Institut, and founded the association of Malagasy Students in France.

== Career ==
=== Research ===
Ratsimamanga started working at the French National Centre for Scientific Research (CNRS) in 1945 after he was approached by Frédéric Joliot-Curie, CNRS's research director and Nobel prize laureate in Chemistry (1935). At CNRS, he pioneered the study of Human blood group systems, and treatments for leprosy and tuberculosis. Ratsimamanga work showed the presence of hormones in the diet and their role in the development of the body, while eliminating the factors of cellular detoxification, especially in the liver.

Ratsimamanga was the founding director of the Malagasy Institute of Applied Research (IMRA) in 1957. IMRA was focused on Phytotherapy to use local plants and traditional practices to cure diseases, i.e., traditional pharmacopoeia. IMRA succeeded in using the Syzygium cumini tree as an anti-diabetic agent, and creating alternative medicines against malaria, leprosy, asthma, lithiasis, blood pressure, hepatitis and other common conditions.

Ratsimamanga was the head of Malagasy National Academy, and a Professor Emeritus of the Faculty of Medicine, University of Antananarivo. He was one of the founders of the World Academy of Sciences in 1983, and the African Academy of Sciences in 1985. He was a member of the Royal Academy for Overseas Sciences, Institut de France (1966), and the Académie Nationale de Médecine (1967).

=== Politics ===
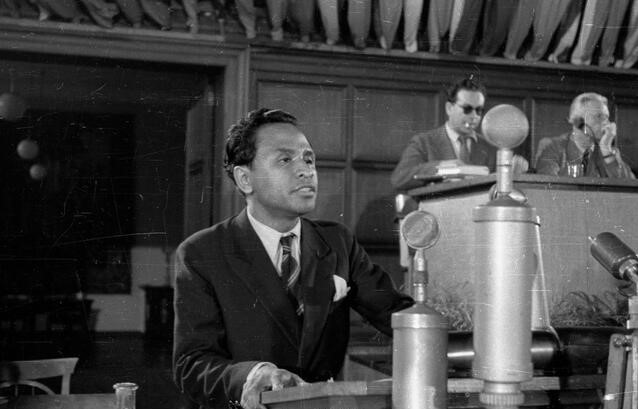
Ratsimamanga speaking at the 1948 World Congress of Intellectuals in Defence of Peace

Ratsimamanga was a pacifist and politically active, and during his years of study, he forged close relationships with French intellectual and political circles. While in France, he co-founded the association of Malagasy Students in France and the Democratic Movement for Malagasy Renovation (MDRM) in 1946 with Jacques Rabemananjara, Joseph Raseta and Joseph Ravoahangy Andrianavalona. MDRM led the protests against the bloody repression of the Malagasy Uprising of 1947. However, MDRM was known to be dominated by Hova elites, who had been politically prominent in the former Merina royal court and wanted to regain the political dominance of the Merina upon independence. Jacques Rabemananjara, Joseph Raseta and Joseph Ravoahangy Andrianavalona were later sentenced to life in prison but were granted amnesty in 1958. Ratsimamanga claimed that he was unaware of the uprising and, thus, was not involved. Later in 1949, Ratsimamanga created the Malagasy National Council, a Government in exile. It was a failure.

On 26 August 1948, Ratsimamanga represented Madagascar at the World Congress of Intellectuals in Defence of Peace, which took place between the 25 to 28 August 1948 of August at Wrocław University of Science and Technology, Poland, and played a role in the framing of the communist powers as supporters of peace, and on the opposite side, portraying the West as a threat to peace.

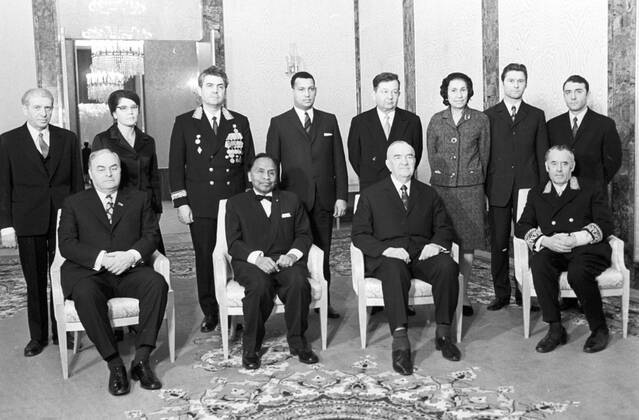
Ratsimamanga after presenting his credentials on 14 December 1972 to the USSR

Ratsimamanga was a member of the delegation that negotiated Madagascar's independence from France. 77% of Malagasy voted for independence in the 1958 referendum, and after the independence, Ratsimamanga was appointed the Malagasy Republic ambassador to France from 1960 to 1972. After the 1972 Coup d'état, on 14 December 1972, he was appointed the first Ambassador of the Malagasy Republic to China and the Soviet Union. He later established embassies in West Germany, North Korea, and Sierra Leone.

Furthermore, Ratsimamanga represents the Malagasy Republic at the European Economic Community, UNESCO, and Food and Agriculture Organization. He also became UNESCO Vice-chairman of the Executive Council.

== Personal life and death ==
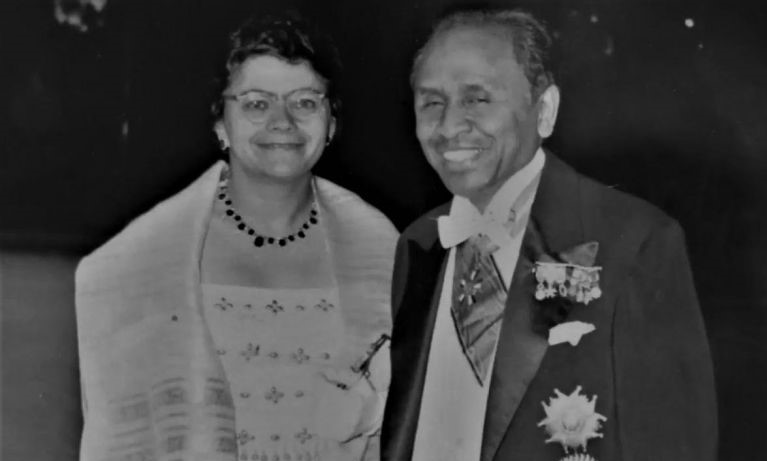
Albert and Suzanne Urverg-Ratsimamanga in China in 1972

Ratsimamanga married Suzanne Urverg-Ratsimamanga on 23 March 1963. She was a French Ashkenazi Jewish biochemist, a Fellow of the World Academy of Sciences (1989), and the African Academy of Sciences (1987), and IMRA's Chair and Albert's closest collaborator. With Albert, she co-founded "Albert and Suzanne Rakoto Ratsimamanga Foundation" within IMRA.

Ratsimamanga died on 16 September 2001, aged 93, in Antananarivo, Madagascar. A state funeral was held for him.

== Awards and honours ==
Ratsimamanga was awarded the Grand Cross of the Malagasy National Order, First Class Grand Cross of the Order of Merit of the Federal Republic of Germany, Grand Officer of the Legion of Honor of France, Grand Officer of the National Order of Scientific Merit of France, National Order of the Lion of Senegal, Commander of the Ordre des Palmes académiques, Commander of the Order of Merit of Congo - Brazzaville, Commander of the Ordre national du Mérite of France, and Grand Prize from the Royal Academy for Overseas Sciences. He was selected Madagascar's Man of the Century in 1999.

Ratsimamanga was a Founder Fellow of the World Academy of Sciences (FTWAS) in 1983, and the African Academy of Sciences in 1985 (FAAS). He was awarded an Honorary Doctorate from the Cheikh Anta Diop University in 1973.

== Legacy ==
Albert Rakoto Ratsimamanga is considered one of Madagascar's most renowned scholars. A commemorative stamp was issued in his memory in 2002, and the Institut de France minted a coin tribute to Ratsimamanga. Ratsimamanga's legacy can be seen as a

Chronological straddling of this diasporic projection with political independence and loyalty to an aristocratic ethos with a progressive rallying to a republican conception of citizenship

— Didier Galibert, Imperial Cosmopolitanism and Nationalism: The Circular Life of Albert Rakoto Ratsimamanga (1907-2001) (French: Cosmopolitisme impérial et nationalisme: La vie circulaire d'Albert Rakoto Ratsimamanga (1907-2001)), French Colonial History, 2012, Vol. 13, pp. 175
