= National Order of Madagascar =

Highest order of Madagascar

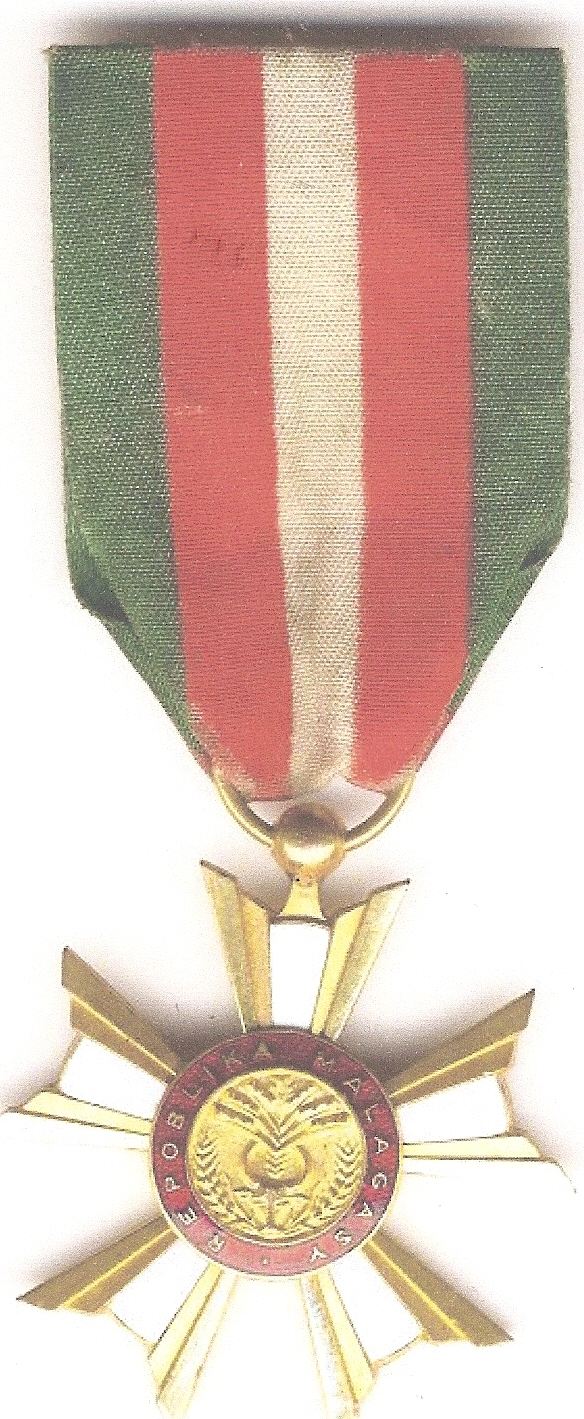
- National Order of Madagascar.

Awarded by President of Madagascar
- Type: Order
- Established: 23 September 1959
- Motto: Repoblika Malagasy
- Awarded for: Services to the state of Madagascar
- Founder: Philibert Tsiranana

Precedence
- Next (higher): None
- Next (lower): National Order of Merit
- Ribbon of the order

The National Order of Madagascar is the highest of honorific orders of Madagascar.

== History ==
The National Order was created on 23 September 1959, after the Malagasy Republic was proclaimed.

== Classes ==
The Order consists of the following classes of merit:

- Grand Cordon
- Grand Cross
  - First class
  - Second class
- Grand Officer
- Commander
- Officer
- Knight

Bars
Knight	Officer	Commander	Grand Officer	Grand Cross, Class II	Grand Cross, Class I	Grand Cordon

== Recipients ==
- Al-Waleed bin Talal
- Alison Jolly
- Anne, Princess Royal
- Haile Selassie
- Konrad Adenauer
- Levi Eshkol
- Mohammed VI of Morocco
- Mufaddal Saifuddin
- Ram Nath Kovind
- Recep Tayyip Erdoğan
- Romain Bruno Légaré
- Sitraka Andrinivo, among the youngest recipients
- Kim Il Sung
- Albert Rakoto Ratsimamanga
- Joseph Boayue, former Liberian Secretary of Public Works
