= Ambatomena, Manjakandriana =

Ambatomena
- Location in Madagascar
- Coordinates: 18°47′S 47°46′E
- Country: Madagascar
- Region: Analamanga
- District: Manjakandriana
- Elevation: 1,434 m (4,705 ft)

Population (2001)
  - Total: 8,000
- Time zone: UTC3 (EAT)

Ambatomena is a town and commune in Madagascar. It belongs to the district of Manjakandriana, which is a part of Analamanga Region. The population of the commune was estimated to be approximately 8,000 in 2001 commune census.

In addition to primary schooling the town offers secondary education at both junior and senior levels. The majority 90% of the population of the commune are farmers. The most important crop is rice, while other important products are beans, cassava and potatoes. Services provide employment for 10% of the population.
