= Léon Deubel =

French poet (1879–1913)

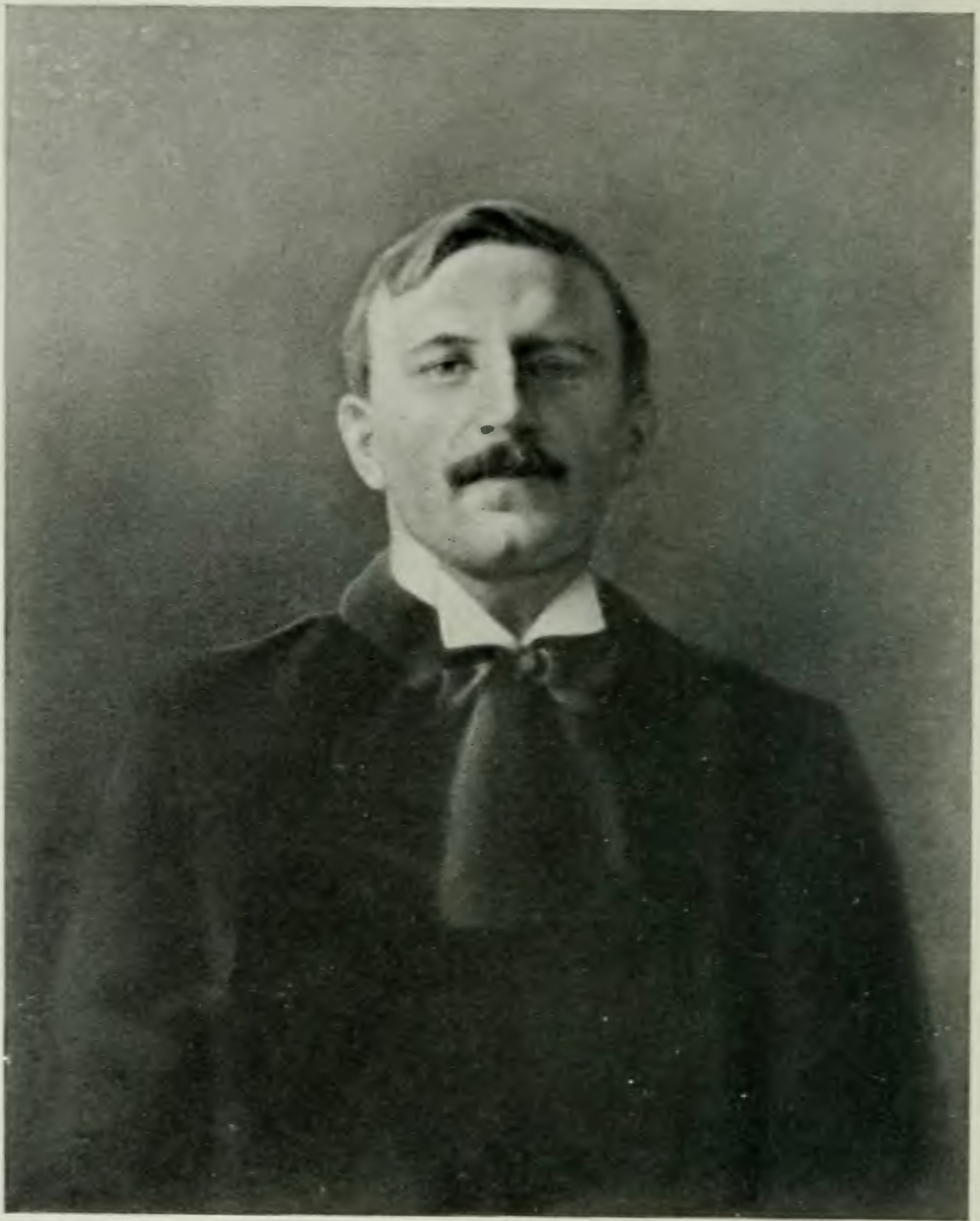
- Born: 22 March 1879; Belfort, France
- Died: 12 June 1913 (aged 34); Maisons-Alfort, France
- Occupation: Poet
- Writing career
- Notable works: Demain , Détresse, Tombeau du Poète
- Literary movement: Poète Maudit

Léon Deubel (22 March 1879 – 12 June 1913) was a French poet.

== Biography ==
Poor, misfit, he killed himself by plunging into the Marne after he burned his manuscripts. Deubel is considered to have been the last poète maudit. He was associated with the syndicalist Pierre Monatte.

== Bibliography ==
- Maurice Favone, Le Poète Léon Deubel, Paris, R. Debresse, Bibliothèque de l’artistocratie, 1939, 63 pages.
