= 1917–18 Dumbarton F.C. season =

Dumbarton
1917–1918 season
- Manager: James Collins
- Stadium: Boghead Park, Dumbarton
- Scottish League: 8th
- Top goalscorer: League: John McCulloch (13); All: John McCulloch (13)
- Highest home attendance: 8,000
- Lowest home attendance: 2,000
- Average home league attendance: 3,260
Home colours

The 1917–18 season was the 41st Scottish football season in which Dumbarton competed at national level, entering the Scottish Football League. in addition Dumbarton played in the Dumbartonshire Cup and the Dumbartonshire Charity Cup.

== Scottish League ==
This was the fourth season of war-time football, where the playing of all national competitions, other than the Scottish League, was suspended. Membership of the League was reduced from 20 to 18, with Aberdeen, Dundee and Raith Rovers withdrawing and Clydebank being admitted. Dumbarton's 8th-place finish with 34 points (22 behind champions Rangers) was their best performance since the 1893–94 season.

18 August 1917 League	Dumbarton	4–1	Falkirk	Boghead Park
	McKim; Finnie; Stewart		Shearer 3'	Attendance: 3,000; Referee: A Edward

25 August 1917 League	Motherwell	0–0	Dumbarton	Fir Park
				Attendance: 6,000; Referee: T Dougray

1 September 1917 League	Dumbarton	0–3	Morton	Boghead Park
			Broad 40'; McNab	Attendance: 3,000

8 September 1917 League	Partick Thistle	0–0	Dumbarton	Firhill Park
				Attendance: 7,000; Referee: J Dickson

15 September 1917 League	Dumbarton	2–1	Queen's Park	Boghead Park
	Finnie; Ritchie, W 45'		Walker	Attendance: 3,000; Referee: J Binnie

22 September 1917 League	St Mirren	2–1	Dumbarton	Love Street (stadium)
	Harris 50'; Lindsay 53'		Cairney 80'	Attendance: 5,000

29 September 1917 League	Dumbarton	2–4	Rangers	Boghead Park
	Stewart (pen.)		Muirhead; Cairns	Attendance: 8,000

6 October 1917 League	Hibernian	0–3	Dumbarton	Easter Road Stadium
			McCulloch 5'; Stewart (pen.)	Attendance: 4,000

13 October 1917 League	Dumbarton	2–3	Clydebank	Boghead Park
	McCulloch 30', 46'		Brander 5'; Neish; O'Kane	Attendance: 7,000

20 October 1917 League	Hamilton	2–0	Dumbarton	Douglas Park
	Faulds; Kelly			Attendance: 4,000

27 October 1917 League	Dumbarton	1–4	Kilmarnock	Boghead Park
	McCulloch 44'		Goldie 5'; Culley; Hamilton, T (pen.)	Attendance: 3,000

3 November 1917 League	Clyde	0–4	Dumbarton	Shawfield Stadium
			Ritchie, W McCulloch	Attendance: 3,000

10 November 1917 League	Ayr United	0–1	Dumbarton	Somerset Park
			Ritchie, W 10'	Attendance: 3,000

17 November 1917 League	Dumbarton	0–2	Celtic	Boghead Park
			Gallagher 7'; Browning 52'	Attendance: 7,000; Referee: Mr Kelso

24 November 1917 League	Dumbarton	4–3	Motherwell	Boghead Park
	McCulloch 2', 5'; Thom 45'		Morgan; Ferguson 90' (pen.)	Attendance: 2,000

1 December 1917 League	Rangers	2–1	Dumbarton	Ibrox Park
	Cairns		McCulloch	Attendance: 15,000

8 December 1917 League	Dumbarton	1–0	Hibernian	Boghead Park
	Raeside			Attendance: 4,000

15 December 1917 League	Dumbarton	2–0	Airdrie	Boghead Park
	McCulloch 65'; Thom 85'			Attendance: 2,500

22 December 1917 League	Celtic	3–0	Dumbarton	Celtic Park
	McMenemy 47'; Gallagher			Attendance: 8,000

29 December 1917 League	Dumbarton	1–1	Hearts	Boghead Park
	Thom 85'		Sharpe 20'	Attendance: 3,000; Referee: J Howden

31 December 1917 League	Clydebank	1–2	Dumbarton	Clydeholm Park
	Travers 17'		Thom 14'; Gunn 40' (pen.)	Attendance: 10,000

5 January 1918 League	Third Lanark	4–1	Dumbarton	Cathkin Park
	McLean 20' 83'; Duncan 90'		McCulloch 53'	Attendance: 4,000

26 January 1918 League	Dumbarton	3–1	Clyde	Boghead Park
	Raeside; Durnin; Thom		McGowan	Attendance: 1,500

2 February 1918 League	Kilmarnock	0–0	Dumbarton	Rugby Park
				Attendance: 5,000

9 February 1918 League	Dumbarton	0–1	Third Lanark	Boghead Park
			Duncan	Attendance: 1,500

16 February 1918 League	Morton	2–2	Dumbarton	Cappielow Park
	Stevenson, R Seymour		McKim 5'; Stewart	Attendance: 4,000

23 February 1918 League	Dumbarton	1–0	Ayr United	Boghead Park
	Stewart			Attendance: 2,000

2 March 1918 League	Dumbarton	5–2	St Mirren	Boghead Park
	Thom; Stewart; Ritchie, W		Higginbotham; Durward	Attendance: 2,000

9 March 1918 League	Queen's Park	2–0	Dumbarton	Hampden Park
	Aitken 20'; Morton, R			Attendance: 5,000

16 March 1918 League	Airdrie	0–0	Dumbarton	Broomfield Park
				Attendance: 2,000

23 March 1918 League	Dumbarton	1–2	Hamilton	Boghead Park
	Stewart		Crawford 45'; Murphy	Attendance: 2,000

6 April 1918 League	Dumbarton	1–1	Partick Thistle	Boghead Park
	Stewart 47'		Bowie 46'	Attendance: 2,000

13 April 1918 League	Hearts	1–2	Dumbarton	Tynecastle Stadium
	Gibson 15' (pen.)		McKim; Durnin	Attendance: 4,500; Referee: A Allan

20 April 1918 League	Falkirk	1–1	Dumbarton	Brockville Park
	Simpson		Finnie	Attendance: 2,000

== Dumbartonshire Cup ==
Dumbarton re-entered the Dumbartonshire Cup for the first time in three seasons, but lost out to Clydebank in the final, which was held over until the beginning of the 1918–19 season.

30 March 1918 Semi Final	Dumbarton	2–1	Dumbarton Harp	Boghead Park
	Durnin; Stewart		Goal

7 September 1918 Final	Dumbarton	0–1	Clydebank	Boghead Park
			Travers	Attendance: 6,000

== Dumbartonshire Charity Cup ==
Dumbarton retained the Dumbartonshire Charity Cup for the second successive year by beating Renton in the final.

4 May 1918 First Round	Dumbarton	2–0	Dumbarton Harp	Boghead Park
	Finnie; Ritchie, W			Attendance: 4,000

18 May 1918 Semi Final	Clydebank	2–3 (a.e.t.)	Dumbarton	Clydholm Park
	Sutherland		Durnin; Thom 45'; McGregor (pen.)	Attendance: 6,000

28 May 1918 Final	Dumbarton	2–1 (a.e.t.)	Renton	Boghead Park
	Finnie 50', 115'		Harris	Attendance: 1,500

== Charity matches ==
During the season two charity matches were played for the benefit of the Red Cross War Fund, both being won, scoring 8 goals for the loss of 4.

4 August 1917 Charity Match	Dumbarton Harp	0–3	Dumbarton	Meadow Park, Dumbarton
			Trialist; Finnie

11 August 1917 Charity Match	Dumbarton Harp	4–5	Dumbarton	Meadow Park, Dumbarton
	Trialist; Gunn (o.g.); McDonald		Finnie; Ritchie, W Stewart	Attendance: 1,500

== Player statistics ==
=== Squad ===
No.	Pos	Nat	Player	Total		Scottish League	
No.	Pos	Nat	Player	Apps	Goals	Apps	Goals
	GK	(Scotland) SCO	John Miller	34	0	34	0
	DF	(Scotland) SCO	Felix Gunn	12	1	12	1
	DF	(Scotland) SCO	Alex Marshall	24	0	24	0
	DF	(Scotland) SCO	Bob McGrory	34	0	34	0
	DF	(Scotland) SCO	Archibald Ritchie	3	0	3	0
	DF	(Scotland) SCO	John Semple	1	0	1	0
	MF	(Scotland) SCO	John Durnin	21	2	21	2
	MF	(Scotland) SCO	James McGregor	19	1	19	1
	MF	(Scotland) SCO	John McMeekin	1	0	1	0
	MF	(Scotland) SCO	Thomas Raeside	29	2	29	2
	MF	(Scotland) SCO	Alex Trotter	17	0	17	0
	MF	(Scotland) SCO	William Wilson	25	0	25	0
	FW	(Scotland) SCO	Richard Bell	1	0	1	0
	FW	(Scotland) SCO	John Brodie	1	0	1	0
	FW	(Scotland) SCO	Hugh Cairney	6	1	6	1
	FW	(Scotland) SCO	David Finnie	31	3	31	3
	FW	(Scotland) SCO	William Gallacher	1	0	1	0
	FW	(Scotland) SCO	John McCulloch	18	13	18	13
	FW	(Scotland) SCO	John McKim	20	4	20	4
	FW	(Scotland) SCO	Arthur Murphy	1	0	1	0
	FW	(Scotland) SCO	William Ritchie	27	4	27	4
	FW	(Scotland) SCO	Finlay Speedie	2	0	2	0
	FW	(Scotland) SCO	James Stewart	13	9	13	9
	FW	(Scotland) SCO	Alexander Thom	33	9	33	9
	FW	(Scotland) SCO	Fred Williams	1	0	1	0

=== Transfers ===
==== Players in ====
Player	From	Date
(Scotland) David Finnie	(Scotland) Cambuslang R	7 Jul 1917
(Scotland) James McGregor	(Scotland) Cambuslang R	7 Jul 1917
(Scotland) William Wilson	(Scotland) Cambuslang R	7 Jul 1917
(Scotland) James Stewart	(Scotland) Hamilton (loan)	17 Jul 1917
(Scotland) John McMeekin	(Scotland) Glasgow Perthshire	18 Jul 1917
(Scotland) Alex Marshall	(Scotland) Ashfield	24 Aug 1917
(Scotland) Alex Trotter	(Scotland) Rangers	25 Aug 1917
(Scotland) Richard Bell	(Scotland) Rangers (loan)	14 Sep 1917
(Scotland) John McCulloch	(Scotland) Vale of Clyde	29 Sep 1917
(Scotland) John Durnin	(Scotland) Partick Thistle	1 Nov 1917
(Scotland) John Brodie	(Scotland) Celtic (loan)	1 Jan 1918
(Scotland) Fred Williams	(England) Bradford PA	14 Feb 1918
(Scotland) William Gallacher	(Scotland) Vale of Leven (loan)	27 Feb 1918

==== Players out ====
Player	To	Date
(Scotland) James Lister	(Scotland) Morton	31 Jul 1917
(Scotland) John Semple	(Scotland) Ayr United	7 Aug 1917
(Scotland) Pat Travers	(Scotland) Clydebank	14 Aug 1917
(Scotland) George Baird	(Scotland) Rangers	17 Dec 1917
(Scotland) John McCulloch	(Scotland) St Mirren	12 Apr 1918
(Scotland) Hugh Cairney	(Scotland) Airdrie (loan)	31 Jan 1918
(Scotland) Alexander Thom	(Scotland) Kilmarnock (loan)	

In addition Robert Catterson, Thomas Hamilton and Joseph Tait all played their final 'first XI' games in Dumbarton colours.
