= 1916–17 Dumbarton F.C. season =

Dumbarton
1916–1917 season
- Manager: James Collins
- Stadium: Boghead Park, Dumbarton
- Scottish League: 10th
- Top goalscorer: League: Cairney/ Lister (13); All: Cairney/ Lister (13)
- Highest home attendance: 8,000
- Lowest home attendance: 2,000
- Average home league attendance: 3,160
Home colours

The 1916–17 season was the 40th Scottish football season in which Dumbarton competed at national level, entering the Scottish Football League. In addition Dumbarton played in the Dumbartonshire Charity Cup.

== Scottish League ==
This was the third season of war-time football, where the playing of all other national competitions, including the Scottish Cup, were suspended. Dumbarton finished 10th out of 20 in the league, with 35 points, 29 behind champions Celtic.

19 August 1916 League	Queen's Park	1–0	Dumbarton	Hampden Park
	Cowan 70' (pen.)			Attendance: 4,000; Referee: J Stevenson

26 August 1916 League	Dumbarton	2–1	St Mirren	Boghead Park
	Travers; Catterson		Pringle	Attendance: 2,000; Referee: T Robertson

2 September 1916 League	Rangers	6–0	Dumbarton	Ibrox Park
	Duncan, C Duncan, S (pen.); Cairns; Logan			Attendance: 10,000; Referee: T Robertson

9 September 1916 League	Dumbarton	2–1	Hibernian	Boghead Park
	Thom; Lister 35'		Muirhead 50'	Attendance: 2,000; Referee: P Grant

16 September 1916 League	Airdrie	2–1	Dumbarton	Broomfield Park
	Yarnell		Thom	Attendance: 2,000; Referee: J Binnie

23 September 1916 League	Dumbarton	3–1	Motherwell	Boghead Park
	Lister; Thom 35'		Finlayson 44'	Attendance: 3,000; Referee: J Dryburgh

30 September 1916 League	Falkirk	2–3	Dumbarton	Brockville Park
	Simpson 37'; McCulloch		Lister 35'; Garry 50' (pen.)	Attendance: 4,000; Referee: T Robertson

7 October 1916 League	Dumbarton	1–4	Morton	Boghead Park
	Lister 4'		Parker 20', 35'; McNab 75'	Attendance: 4,000; Referee: P Grant

14 October 1916 League	Raith Rovers	0–3	Dumbarton	Starks Park
			Lister; Thom	Attendance: 1,500; Referee: T Dougray

21 October 1916 League	Partick Thistle	6–0	Dumbarton	Firhill Park
	Harris 7'; McMullen; Branscombe; Morgan; Bowie			Attendance: 8,000; Referee: J Dickson

28 October 1916 League	Dumbarton	1–1	Aberdeen	Boghead Park
	Garry 57' (pen.)		Wylie 88'	Attendance: 2,000; Referee: M Dickie

4 November 1916 League	Ayr United	3–1	Dumbarton	Somerset Park
	Middleton 15'; Marshall 30'; Crombie 60'		Ritchie, W 44'	Attendance: 2,000; Referee: G McKenzie

11 November 1916 League	Dumbarton	4–3	Dundee	Boghead Park
	Lister 15', 33'; Ritchie, W 52', 88'		Brown 3', 59'; Troupe 13'	Attendance: 3,000

18 November 1916 League	Hamilton	3–1	Dumbarton	Douglas Park
	McLennan 5'; McNeil; McNamee		Raeside	Attendance: 2,000; Referee: A Kirkland

25 November 1916 League	Dumbarton	1–1	Kilmarnock	Boghead Park
	Thom 88'		McPhail 35'	Attendance: 3,000; Referee: A Jackson

2 December 1916 League	Hearts	0–1	Dumbarton	Tynecastle Stadium
			Ritchie, W 20'	Attendance: 4,000; Referee: A Kirkland

9 December 1916 League	Dumbarton	2–3	Third Lanark	Boghead Park
	Semple 60'; Lister 82'		McLean 7', 31'; Bisset 12'	Attendance: 2,000; Referee: J Stevenson

16 December 1916 League	Dumbarton	2–1	Partick Thistle	Boghead Park
	Thom 18'; Lister 90'		Harris, N 58'	Attendance: 3,000; Referee: A Allan

23 December 1916 League	Clyde	2–2	Dumbarton	Shawfield Stadium
	McGowan 87'		McKim; Reid	Attendance: 2,000; Referee: T McMillan

30 December 1916 League	Dumbarton	0–2	Queen's Park	Boghead Park
			McDiarmid 30', 35'	Attendance: 3,000; Referee: R Kelso

1 January 1917 League	Dumbarton	2–2	Raith Rovers	Boghead Park
	Lister; Thom		Abbot; Lindsay	Attendance: 2,000; Referee: A Edward

2 January 1917 League	Third Lanark	1–1	Dumbarton	Cathkin Park
	McLean		Thom	Attendance: 3,000; Referee: T Dougray

6 January 1917 League	Dumbarton	5–1	Clyde	Boghead Park
	Cairney 8', 11', 30', 65'; McKim		Jackson 49'	Attendance: 3,000; Referee: T Dougray

20 January 1917 League	Celtic	1–1	Dumbarton	Celtic Park
	McCall 80'		Cairney 60'	Attendance: 5,000; Referee: T McMillan

27 January 1917 League	Hibernian	3–1	Dumbarton	Easter Road Stadium
	Kilpatrick; Campbell		Cairney	Attendance: 4,000; Referee: J Dickson

3 February 1917 League	Dumbarton	4–1	Hearts	Boghead Park
	Cairney 40', 60'; Ritchie, W 44'; Thom 49'		Gallacher 25'	Attendance: 3,000; Referee: A Allan

10 February 1917 League	Motherwell	3–0	Dumbarton	Fir Park
	Ferguson (pen.)			Referee: A Kirkland

17 February 1917 League	Dumbarton	0–3	Rangers	Boghead Park
			Cairns; Bell; Cross	Attendance: 5,000; Referee: T Dougray

24 February 1917 League	Dumbarton	3–1	Ayr United	Boghead Park
	Cairney 10'; Garry 61'; Thom 65'		Crigan, W 42'	Attendance: 2,000; Referee: A Edward

3 March 1917 League	Dumbarton	0–0	Hamilton	Boghead Park
				Attendance: 2,000; Referee: M Dickie

10 March 1917 League	Aberdeen	2–4	Dumbarton	Pittodrie Stadium
	Wylie, J 2'; Miller (o.g.)		Cairney 30' 50'; Reid	Attendance: 2,000; Referee: T Robertson

17 March 1917 League	Dundee	4–1	Dumbarton	Dens Park
	Brown; Fisher		Gunn	Attendance: 3,000

24 March 1917 League	Kilmarnock	0–0	Dumbarton	Rugby Park
				Attendance: 2,000

31 March 1917 League	Dumbarton	1–1	Falkirk	Boghead Park
	Cairney 55'		Reid 60' (o.g.)	Attendance: 2,000

7 April 1917 League	Dumbarton	1–3	Celtic	Boghead Park
	Ritchie, W 6'		Brown 13'; McColl 35'; Dodds 80' (pen.)	Attendance: 8,000

14 April 1917 League	Morton	3–1	Dumbarton	Cappielow Park
	Stevenson; McNab		Stewart	Attendance: 5,000

21 April 1917 League	Dumbarton	1–1	Airdrie	Boghead Park
	McKim 8'		Kennedy 44'	Attendance: 4,000

28 April 1917 League	St Mirren	0–0	Dumbarton	Love Street (stadium)
				Attendance: 4,000; Referee: Mr Jackson

== Dumbartonshire Charity Cup ==
Dumbarton won the trophy for the first time by beating Dumbarton Harp in the final.

12 May 1917 Semi Final	Dumbarton	3–1	Clydebank	Boghead Park
	Thom 13'; Ritchie 30'; Stewart 54'		Yarnell 52'	Attendance: 5,000

19 May 1917 Final	Dumbarton	3–0	Dumbarton Harp	Boghead Park
	Reid 18'; Stewart 80'; Cairney 83'			Attendance: 4,000

== Player statistics ==
No.	Pos	Nat	Player	Total		Scottish League	
No.	Pos	Nat	Player	Apps	Goals	Apps	Goals
	GK	(Scotland) SCO	Thomas Hamilton	10	0	10	0
	GK	(Scotland) SCO	John Miller	28	0	28	0
	DF	(Scotland) SCO	Felix Gunn	13	1	13	1
	DF	(Scotland) SCO	Bob McGrory	37	0	37	0
	DF	(Scotland) SCO	Archibald Ritchie	1	0	1	0
	DF	(Scotland) SCO	John Semple	34	1	34	1
	MF	(Scotland) SCO	George Baird	14	0	14	0
	MF	(Scotland) SCO	Fraser	1	0	1	0
	MF	(Scotland) SCO	Thomas Raeside	34	1	34	1
	FW	(Scotland) SCO	Hugh Cairney	24	13	24	13
	FW	(Scotland) SCO	Robert Catterson	5	1	5	1
	FW	(Scotland) SCO	Ted Garry	21	3	21	3
	FW	(Scotland) SCO	James Lister	23	13	23	13
	FW	(Scotland) SCO	John McKim	36	3	36	3
	FW	(Scotland) SCO	Robert Reid	21	2	21	2
	FW	(Scotland) SCO	William Ritchie	36	6	36	6
	FW	(Scotland) SCO	James Stewart	7	1	7	1
	FW	(Scotland) SCO	Joseph Tait	3	0	3	0
	FW	(Scotland) SCO	Alexander Thom	36	10	36	10
	FW	(Scotland) SCO	Pat Travers	34	1	34	1

=== Transfers ===
==== Players in ====
Player	From	Date
(Scotland) John McKim	(Scotland) Petershill	17 Jun 1916
(Scotland) Robert Catterson	(Scotland) Strathclyde	1 Jul 1916
(Scotland) James Lister	(Scotland) Rangers	5 Aug 1916
(Scotland) George Baird	(Scotland) Rangers	5 Aug 1916
(Scotland) Hugh Cairney	(Scotland) Bellshill Ath	15 Aug 1916
(Scotland) Joseph Tait	(Scotland) Pollok	15 Aug 1916
(Scotland) John Semple	(Scotland) Ayr United (loan)	30 Aug 1916
(Scotland) Thomas Raeside	(Scotland) Ashfield	7 Sep 1916
(Scotland) Robert Reid	(Scotland) St Mirren (loan)	23 Nov 1916
(Scotland) James Stewart	(Scotland) Hamilton (loan)	5 Apr 1917

==== Players out ====
Player	To	Date
(Scotland) James Riddell	(Scotland) Rangers	29 Aug 1916
(Scotland) Thomas Gilchrist	(Scotland) Celtic	
(Scotland) Thomas Hamilton	(Scotland) Renton	
(Scotland) Alex McGregor	(Scotland) Vale of Leven	
(Scotland) Patrick O'Neill	(Scotland) Dumbarton Harp	

In addition James Arnott, John Chalmers, Alfred Gettins, Peter McFie and Arthur Murphy all played their final 'first XI' games in Dumbarton colours.
