= 1915–16 Dumbarton F.C. season =

Dumbarton
1915–1916 season
- Manager: James Collins
- Stadium: Boghead Park, Dumbarton
- Scottish League: 9th
- Top goalscorer: League: Patrick O'Neill (14); All: Patrick O'Neill (14)
- Highest home attendance: 7,000
- Lowest home attendance: 2,000
- Average home league attendance: 3,420
Home colours

The 1915–16 season was the 39th Scottish football season in which Dumbarton competed at national level, entering the Scottish Football League. In addition Dumbarton played in the Dumbartonshire Charity Cup.

== Scottish League ==
In the second season of war-time football, where the Scottish League was the only national competition which was played, Dumbarton achieved their best league performance in over 20 years by finishing 9th out of 20, with 37 points, 30 behind champions Celtic.

21 August 1915 League	Dumbarton	1–3	Rangers	Boghead Park
	Gettins (pen.)		Reid 10', 40'; Cunningham	Attendance: 6,000; Referee: J Weir

28 August 1915 League	Aberdeen	2–2	Dumbarton	Pittodrie Stadium
	Walker 13'; Main		McGregor 60'; O'Neill 62'	Attendance: 4,000; Referee: A Allan

4 September 1915 League	Dumbarton	0–3	Ayr United	Boghead Park
			Crombie; Richardson; Ingram	Attendance: 4,000; Referee: M Dickie

11 September 1915 League	Motherwell	4–1	Dumbarton	Fir Park
	Neil; Waugh; Gray 45'		Farrell 55'	Attendance: 5,000; Referee: A Edward

18 September 1915 League	Dumbarton	3–1	Falkirk	Boghead Park
	Ritchie, W 48', 65'; O'Neill 68'		Gibbons 87'	Attendance: 4,000; Referee: A Edward

25 September 1915 League	Kilmarnock	5–1	Dumbarton	Rugby Park
	Short 20'; Murray; Armour; Culley		Ritchie, W 20'	Attendance: 3,000; Referee: A Jackson

2 October 1915 League	Dumbarton	1–1	Dundee	Boghead Park
	McGregor 60'		Fisher 15'	Attendance: 3,000; Referee: A Edward

9 October 1915 League	Dumbarton	2–4	Queen's Park	Boghead Park
	O'Neill		Sibbald; Morton, R	Attendance: 3,000; Referee: J Binnie

16 October 1915 League	St Mirren	1–2	Dumbarton	Love Street (stadium)
	Bruce 5'		Ritchie 2'; Travers 10'	Attendance: 5,000; Referee: L Wynne

23 October 1915 League	Dumbarton	3–1	Airdrie	Boghead Park
	McGregor		Williams (pen.)	Attendance: 5,000; Referee: T Robertson

30 October 1915 League	Hibernian	1–1	Dumbarton	Easter Road Stadium
	Meagher		O'Neill 30'	Attendance: 3,000; Referee: A Jackson

6 November 1915 League	Dumbarton	2–1	Clyde	Boghead Park
	McGregor 13'; Ritchie, W 50'		Scouller 34'	Attendance: 3,000; Referee: A Jackson

13 November 1915 League	Morton	3–1	Dumbarton	Cappielow Park
	Buchanan 10'; Stevenson		Ritchie, W	Attendance: 3,000; Referee: J Stevenson

20 November 1915 League	Dumbarton	1–1	Third Lanark	Boghead Park
	Rowan 10'		Anderson 25'	Attendance: 2,000; Referee: R Kelso

27 November 1915 League	Hearts	3–1	Dumbarton	Tynecastle Stadium
	Millar 20'; Welsh 21'; Graham		Ritchie, W	Attendance: 4,500; Referee: H Humphrey

4 December 1915 League	Dumbarton	1–0	Raith Rovers	Boghead Park
	Ritchie, W 40'			Attendance: 3,000; Referee: G McKenzie

11 December 1915 League	Dumbarton	2–0	Partick Thistle	Boghead Park
	McGregor 20'; Thom 89'			Attendance: 2,000; Referee: R Murray

18 December 1915 League	Hamilton	1–1	Dumbarton	Douglas Park
	Kelly		Ritchie, W	Attendance: 3,000; Referee: H Humphrey

25 December 1915 League	Dumbarton	0–0	Motherwell	Boghead Park
				Attendance: 2,000; Referee: H Dickie

1 January 1916 League	Raith Rovers	1–0	Dumbarton	Starks Park
	Turner			Attendance: 4,000; Referee: J Weir

3 January 1916 League	Ayr United	3–1	Dumbarton	Somerset Park
	Gray; McLaughlin; Rattray		Miller	Attendance: 3,000; Referee: A Allan

8 January 1916 League	Dumbarton	1–2	Celtic	Boghead Park
	Riddell 13'		Brown 60'; Johnstone 72'	Attendance: 7,000; Referee: R Kelso

15 January 1916 League	Partick Thistle	0–0	Dumbarton	Firhill Park
				Attendance: 10,000; Referee: J Matthews

22 January 1916 League	Dumbarton	1–1	Morton	Boghead Park
	Thom		Pickering	Attendance: 4,000; Referee: T Robertson

29 January 1916 League	Airdrie	2–1	Dumbarton	Broomfield Park
	Anderson; Reid		McGregor	Attendance: 2,000; Referee: J Kirkland

5 February 1916 League	Dumbarton	1–1	Hearts	Boghead Park
	O'Neill 53'		Welsh 35'	Attendance: 6,000; Referee: A Jackson

12 February 1916 League	Celtic	6–0	Dumbarton	Celtic Park
	McAtee 37', 75', 83' (pen.); McMaster 76', 86'; Gallacher 79'			Attendance: 6,000; Referee: R Murray

19 February 1916 League	Falkirk	1–2	Dumbarton	Brockville Park
	Harvie		O'Neill 40'	Attendance: 4,000; Referee: J Weir

26 February 1916 League	Dumbarton	7–0	Hamilton	Boghead Park
	Thom; O'Neill; Gilchrist; Robertson (o.g.)			Attendance: 2,000; Referee: A Allan

4 March 1916 League	Dumbarton	2–0	St Mirren	Boghead Park
	O'Neill; Thom			Attendance: 4,000; Referee: J Lyons

11 March 1916 League	Third Lanark	4–0	Dumbarton	Cathkin Park
	McLean			Attendance: 3,000; Referee: J Weir

18 March 1916 League	Dundee	0–1	Dumbarton	Dens Park
			Riddell (pen.)	Attendance: 6,000; Referee: T Robertson

1 April 1916 League	Queen's Park	0–2	Dumbarton	Hampden Park
			Gilchrist 50'; Thom 80'	Attendance: 10,000; Referee: J Lyons

8 April 1916 League	Dumbarton	2–1	Hibernian	Boghead Park
	O'Neill; McGregor		Hutchison	Attendance: 3,000; Referee: A Edward

15 April 1916 League	Clyde	3–1	Dumbarton	Shawfield Stadium
	Watson, C Watson, G Thomson		O'Neill	Attendance: 3,000; Referee: H Humphreys

20 April 1916 League	Rangers	2–2	Dumbarton	Ibrox Park
	Branscombe 50'; Duncan 53'		Ritchie, W 30'; O'Neill 75'	Attendance: 3,000; Referee: T Robertson

25 April 1916 League	Dumbarton	2–1	Aberdeen	Boghead Park
	McGregor 7'; Riddell 85'		Cumming 2'	Attendance: 2,000; Referee: T Dongary

29 April 1916 League	Dumbarton	1–1	Kilmarnock	Boghead Park
	O'Neill 88'		Goldie, G 35'	Attendance: 3,000; Referee: A Kirkland

== Dumbartonshire Charity Cup ==
While Dumbarton did not enter the Dumbartonshire Cup, the Dumbartonshire Charity Cup was played for the first time but Dumbarton were knocked out in the first round by Clydebank.

6 May 1916 First round	Clydebank	5–1	Dumbarton	Clydeholm Park
	Michie; Philips; Welsh		Ritchie

== Friendlies ==
During the season two 'friendlies' were played, both being won, scoring 7 goals for the loss of none.

22 April 1916 Friendly	Dumbarton	1–0	Vale of Leven	Boghead Park
	Thom

20 May 1916 Friendly	Dumbarton	6–0	Clydebank	Boghead Park
	Arnott; Thom; O'Neill; Gilchrist; Ritchie			Attendance: 1,000

== Player statistics ==
No.	Pos	Nat	Player	Total		Scottish League	
No.	Pos	Nat	Player	Apps	Goals	Apps	Goals
	GK	(Scotland) SCO	Thomas Hamilton	38	0	38	0
	DF	(Scotland) SCO	Felix Gunn	33	0	33	0
	DF	(Scotland) SCO	Tommy Kelso	10	0	10	0
	DF	(Scotland) SCO	Bob McGrory	37	0	37	0
	DF	(Scotland) SCO	Archibald Ritchie	1	0	1	0
	MF	(Scotland) SCO	John Chalmers	9	0	9	0
	MF	(Scotland) SCO	Ted Garry	18	0	18	0
	MF	(Scotland) SCO	Peter McFie	8	0	8	0
	MF	(Scotland) SCO	Arthur Murphy	16	0	16	0
	MF	(Scotland) SCO	James Riddell	31	3	31	3
	FW	(Scotland) SCO	James Arnott	1	0	1	0
	FW	(Scotland) SCO	William Farrell	21	1	21	1
	FW	(England) ENG	Alfred Gettins	16	1	16	1
	FW	(Scotland) SCO	Thomas Gilchrist	19	2	19	2
	FW	(Scotland) SCO	Alex McGregor	35	10	35	10
	FW	(Scotland) SCO	John Miller	3	1	3	1
	FW	(Scotland) SCO	Patrick O'Neill	26	14	26	14
	FW	(Scotland) SCO	William Ritchie	35	10	35	10
	FW	(Scotland) SCO	John Rowan	2	1	2	1
	FW	(Scotland) SCO	Alexander Thom	38	8	38	8
	FW	(Scotland) SCO	Pat Travers	21	1	21	1

=== Transfers ===
==== Players in ====
Player	From	Date
(Scotland) William Ritchie	(Scotland) Renton	28 Jul 1915
(Scotland) John Chalmers	(Scotland) Croy Celtic	12 Aug 1915
(Scotland) Felix Gunn	(Scotland) Parkhead	14 Aug 1915
(Scotland) Patrick O'Neill	(Scotland) Burnbank Athletic	14 Aug 1915
(Scotland) Thomas Gilchrist	(Scotland) Rangers	16 Aug 1915
(Scotland) Alex McGregor	(Scotland) Celtic (loan)	21 Aug 1915
(Scotland) William Farrell	(Scotland) Stevenston United (loan)	31 Aug 1915
(Scotland) Arthur Murphy	(Scotland) Airdrie	2 Sep 1915
(Scotland) Tommy Kelso	(Scotland) Rangers (loan)	20 Oct 1915
(Scotland) Ted Garry	(England) Derby County	16 Nov 1915
(Scotland) John Miller	(England) QPR	1 Jan 1916
(Scotland) James Arnott	(England) Leicester City	22 Apr 1916

==== Players out ====
Player	To	Date
(Scotland) John Miller	(Scotland) Airdrie (loan)	23 Mar 1916
(Scotland) James Ferguson	(Scotland) Cowdenbeath	

In addition James Brown, Alexander Davidson, William McAlpine, John Murray, James Thomson, William Watson and Andrew Wilson all played their final 'first XI' games in Dumbarton colours.
