= John McCulloch =

John McCulloch may refer to:

- John McCulloch (congressman) (1806–1879), U.S. congressman from Pennsylvania
- John McCulloch (footballer, born 1896) (1896–?), Scottish footballer
- John McCulloch (Scottish footballer), Scottish footballer
- John Ramsay McCulloch (1789–1864), Scottish Ricardian economist
- John McCulloch (MP) (1842–1912), British Member of Parliament for Glasgow St Rollox, 1885–1886
- John McCulloch (cricketer) (1894–1915), English cricketer

== See also ==
- John McCullough (disambiguation)
- John MacCulloch
