= John Semple =

John Semple may refer to:

- John Semple (minister) (c. 1602–c. 1677), Ulster-Scots Presbyterian minister and Scots Worthy
- John Semple (architect) (1801–1882), Irish architect
- John Semple (footballer) (1889–?), Scottish footballer
- Jock Semple (1903–1988), Scots-American sports official and trainer
- John Greenlees Semple (1904–1985), British mathematician
- John Semple (civil servant) (born 1940), former head of the Northern Ireland Civil Service
- John W. Semple (born 1959), Canadian medical researcher
- John C. Semple, American botanist
