= 1914–15 Dumbarton F.C. season =

Dumbarton
1914–1915 season
- Manager: James Collins
- Stadium: Boghead Park, Dumbarton
- Scottish League Division One: 13th
- Top goalscorer: League: Gettins/ Travers (8); All: Gettins/ Travers (8)
- Highest home attendance: 10,000
- Lowest home attendance: 2,000
- Average home league attendance: 4,210
Home colours

The 1914–15 season was the 38th Scottish football season in which Dumbarton competed at national level, entering the Scottish Football League. All national cup competitions were suspended for the duration of the First World War. In addition Dumbarton played in the Dumbartonshire Cup.

== Scottish First Division ==
Dumbarton's second successive season in the First Division saw an improved performance by finishing 13th out of 20, with 34 points, 31 behind champions Celtic.

15 August 1914 Scottish Division 1	Falkirk	1–3	Dumbarton	Brockville Park
	Reilly 52'		McFie 55'; Rowan; Gettins	Attendance: 6,000; Referee: H Humphreys

22 August 1914 Scottish Division 1	Dumbarton	2–4	St Mirren	Boghead Park
	Travers; Steel		Page; Brown; Clark; Brannick	Attendance: 6,000; Referee: T Dougray

29 August 1914 Scottish Division 1	Queen's Park	2–2	Dumbarton	Hampden Park
	Walker 2', 70'		Rowan 25', 65'	Attendance: 10,000; Referee: J Binnie

5 September 1914 Scottish Division 1	Dumbarton	1–2	Ayr United	Boghead Park
	Thom 42'		Richardson 48', 80'	Attendance: 4,000; Referee: J Matthews

12 September 1914 Scottish Division 1	Morton	3–2	Dumbarton	Cappielow Park
	Buchanan 9'; Seymour		Rowan	Attendance: 2,000; Referee: J Stevenson

19 September 1914 Scottish Division 1	Dumbarton	1–1	Dundee	Boghead Park
	Watson 70'		Steven	Attendance: 5,000; Referee: J Lyons

26 September 1914 Scottish Division 1	Motherwell	2–3	Dumbarton	Fir Park
	Bond; Waugh		Watson 45'; McFie; Travers	Attendance: 5,000; Referee: A Allan

3 October 1914 Scottish Division 1	Dumbarton	3–2	Hearts	Boghead Park
	Travers 27'; Riddell 48' (pen.); Rowan 85'		Davidson 16' (o.g.); Thomson 24' (o.g.)	Attendance: 6,000; Referee: A Jackson

5 October 1914 Scottish Division 1	Dundee	0–0	Dumbarton	Dens Park
				Attendance: 5,000

10 October 1914 Scottish Division 1	Hamilton	4–1	Dumbarton	Dens Park
	Stewart; Miller, J Rankin		Rowan	Attendance: 6,000; Referee: T Robertson

17 October 1914 Scottish Division 1	Dumbarton	1–4	Airdrie	Boghead Park
	Riddell (pen.)		Reid (pen.); Donaldson; Paterson; Thomson	Attendance: 6,000; Referee: W Shanks

24 October 1914 Scottish Division 1	Clyde	2–1	Dumbarton	Shawfield Stadium
	Allan; Milligan		McGregor	Attendance: 3,000; Referee: J Weir

31 October 1914 Scottish Division 1	Dumbarton	2–1	Third Lanark	Boghead Park
	Watson 75'; Thom		Smith, J	Attendance: 4,000; Referee: T Robertson

7 November 1914 Scottish Division 1	Hibernian	2–2	Dumbarton	Easter Road Stadium
	McGregor (o.g.); Reid		Gettins; Davidson	Attendance: 3,000; Referee: J Binnie

14 November 1914 Scottish Division 1	Dumbarton	1–1	Rangers	Boghead Park
	Travers		Reid	Attendance: 10,000; Referee: A Allan

21 November 1914 Scottish Division 1	Aberdeen	0–0	Dumbarton	Pittodrie Stadium
				Attendance: 6,000; Referee: J Matthews

28 November 1914 Scottish Division 1	Dumbarton	1–4	Celtic	Boghead Park
	Brown 31'		McAtee 10'; McColl 23', 59'; McMenemy 70'	Attendance: 4,000; Referee: L Wynne

5 December 1914 Scottish Division 1	Dumbarton	0–2	Partick Thistle	Boghead Park
			Branscombe 35'; Whittle 47'	Attendance: 2,000; Referee: R Murray

12 December 1914 Scottish Division 1	Raith Rovers	1–2	Dumbarton	Starks Park
	Gibson (pen.)		Brown 40'; Gettins	Attendance: 1,000; Referee: J Lyons

19 December 1914 Scottish Division 1	Ayr United	2–1	Dumbarton	Somerset Park
	McLaughlin 5' (pen.); Richardson		Travers 30'	Attendance: 4,000; Referee: J Weir

26 December 1914 Scottish Division 1	Dumbarton	2–1	Clyde	Boghead Park
	Thom 7'; Gettins		Barr	Attendance: 4,000; Referee: T Robertson

1 January 1915 Scottish Division 1	Dumbarton	3–1	Raith Rovers	Boghead Park
	Travers; Steel; McGregor		Martin	Attendance: 2,000; Referee: J Dickson

2 January 1915 Scottish Division 1	St Mirren	1–1	Dumbarton	Love Street (stadium)
	Reid, R		Gettins	Attendance: 4,000; Referee: R Murray

9 January 1915 Scottish Division 1	Dumbarton	3–0	Queen's Park	Boghead Park
	McGregor; Brown; Riddell			Attendance: 3,000; Referee: T Dougray

16 January 1915 Scottish Division 1	Dumbarton	0–4	Kilmarnock	Boghead Park
			West 6'	Attendance: 3,000; Referee: J Stevenson

23 January 1915 Scottish Division 1	Rangers	1–0	Dumbarton	Ibrox Park
	Cairns			Attendance: 8,000; Referee: A Allan

30 January 1915 Scottish Division 1	Dumbarton	3–2	Aberdeen	Boghead Park
	Thom; Travers; Gettins		Walker; Cail	Attendance: 3,000; Referee: J Stevenson

6 February 1915 Scottish Division 1	Airdrie	4–1	Dumbarton	Broomfield Park
	Donaldson; Thomson; Paton		Wilson	Attendance: 2,000; Referee: J Dickson

13 February 1915 Scottish Division 1	Dumbarton	0–1	Hamilton	Boghead Park
			Stewart	Attendance: 4,000; Referee: J Weir

20 February 1915 Scottish Division 1	Celtic	1–0	Dumbarton	Celtic Park
	McColl 12'			Attendance: 7,000; Referee: A Jackson

27 February 1915 Scottish Division 1	Dumbarton	3–2	Morton	Boghead Park
	Ferguson; Thom; Travers		Gourlay	Attendance: 5,000; Referee: J Lyons

6 March 1915 Scottish Division 1	Hearts	4–1	Dumbarton	Tynecastle Stadium
	Gracie 5', 44' (pen.); Graham		Murray 20'	Attendance: 10,500; Referee: J Stevenson

13 March 1915 Scottish Division 1	Partick Thistle	1–2	Dumbarton	Firhill Park
	Whittle 80'		McGregor 53'; Gettins	Attendance: 8,000; Referee: H Humphreys

20 March 1915 Scottish Division 1	Dumbarton	1–0	Hibernian	Boghead Park
	Gettins			Attendance: 3,000; Referee: A Edwards

3 April 1915 Scottish Division 1	Kilmarnock	0–1	Dumbarton	Rugby Park
			McGregor 80'	Attendance: 3,000; Referee: G McKenzie

10 April 1915 Scottish Division 1	Dumbarton	1–1	Motherwell	Boghead Park
	Thom		Nicol	Attendance: 3,000; Referee: J Weir

13 April 1915 Scottish Division 1	Third Lanark	1–0	Dumbarton	Cathkin Park
	Orr 35'			Attendance: 2,000; Referee: A Kirkland

24 April 1915 Scottish Division 1	Dumbarton	0–1	Falkirk	Boghead Park
			Ramsay	Attendance: 4,000; Referee: H Dickie

== Dumbartonshire Cup ==
The Dumbartonshire Cup returned to being played on a league basis followed by a final between the top two, and for the first time since the 1898–99 season Dumbarton were successful by beating Vale of Leven in the final.

19 August 1914 Section	Dumbarton	0–0	Vale of Leven	Boghead Park
				Attendance: 3,000

27 March 1915 Section	Vale of Leven	0–0	Dumbarton	Millburn Park
				Attendance: 4,000

5 April 1915 Section	Dumbarton	3–1	Dumbarton Harp	Boghead Park
	Murray; Gettins; Travers		Goal	Attendance: 2,000

6 April 1915 Section	Dumbarton	6–2	Clydebank	Boghead Park
	Thomson; Gettins; Travers; Riddell		Goal	Attendance: 1,000

17 April 1915 Section	Dumbarton	0–2	Renton	Boghead Park
			Miller; Thomson	Attendance: 2,000

19 April 1915 Section	Dumbarton Harp	0–2	Dumbarton	Meadow Park, Dumbarton
			Harris; Thomson

21 April 1915 Section	Clydebank	0–2	Dumbarton	Clydeholm Park
			Gettins; Thomson	Attendance: 2,000

28 April 1915 Section	Renton	3–1	Dumbarton	Tontine Park
	Goal		Goal

1 May 1915 Final	Dumbarton	4–3	Vale of Leven	Boghead Park
	Thom; McGregor; Gettins		Goal

=== Final league table ===
Pos	Team	Pld	W	D	L	GF	GA	GD	Pts
1	Vale of Leven	8	4	3	1	16	7	+9	11
2	Dumbarton	8	4	2	2	14	8	+6	10
3	Clydebank	8	4	0	4	13	12	+1	8
4	Renton	8	4	0	4	15	15	0	8
5	Dumbarton Harp	8	1	1	6	5	21	−16	3

== Friendlies/Benefit Matches ==
During the season, a friendly, a benefit and a charity match were also played, drawing 2 and losing the other, scoring 6 goals and conceding 7.

25 August 1914 Friendly	Dumbarton Harp	1–1	Dumbarton	Meadow Park, Dumbarton
	Goal		Hamill

9 September 1914 Benefit	Dumbarton	3–4	Third Lanark	Boghead Park
	Goal		Goal

15 May 1915 Charity Match	Dumbarton	2–2	Dumbartonshire XI	Boghead Park
	Thom; O'Neill		Goal	Attendance: 1,000

== Player statistics ==
=== Squad ===
No.	Pos	Nat	Player	Total		First Division	
No.	Pos	Nat	Player	Apps	Goals	Apps	Goals
	GK	(Scotland) SCO	Thomas Hamilton	38	0	38	0
	DF	(Scotland) SCO	William McAlpine	4	0	4	0
	DF	(Scotland) SCO	Bob McGrory	33	0	33	0
	DF	(Scotland) SCO	Archibald Ritchie	30	0	30	0
	DF	(Scotland) SCO	James Thomson	22	0	22	0
	MF	(Scotland) SCO	Alex Davidson	22	1	22	1
	MF	(Scotland) SCO	Peter McFie	22	2	22	2
	MF	(Scotland) SCO	Alex McGregor	32	5	32	5
	MF	(Scotland) SCO	James Riddell	36	3	36	3
	FW	(Scotland) SCO	John Brown	5	3	5	3
	FW	(Scotland) SCO	James Ferguson	21	1	21	1
	FW	(England) ENG	Alfred Gettins	30	8	30	8
	FW	(Scotland) SCO	John Murray	6	1	6	1
	FW	(Scotland) SCO	John Rowan	17	7	17	7
	FW	(Scotland) SCO	James Steel	16	2	16	2
	FW	(Scotland) SCO	Alexander Thom	35	6	35	6
	FW	(Scotland) SCO	Pat Travers	37	8	37	8
	FW	(Scotland) SCO	William Watson	11	3	11	3
	FW	(Scotland) SCO	Andrew Wilson	1	0	1	0

=== Transfers ===
==== Players in ====
Player	From	Date
(Scotland) Alex McGregor	(Scotland) Celtic (loan)	19 May 1914
(Scotland) Alexander Davidson	(Scotland) Partick Thistle	20 May 1914
(Scotland) Archibald Ritchie	(Scotland) Stenhousemuir	12 Jun 1914
(Scotland) William Watson	(Scotland) Motherwell (loan)	12 Jun 1914
(Scotland) Pat Travers	(Scotland) Aberdeen	24 Jun 1914
(Scotland) James Steel	(Scotland) Partick Thistle (loan)	28 Jun 1914
(Scotland) Thomas Hamilton	(Scotland) Hamilton	8 Aug 1914
(Scotland) Bob McGrory		8 Aug 1914
(Scotland) Andrew Wilson	(Scotland) Stenhousemuir	6 Jan 1915
(Scotland) Joseph Harris	(Scotland) Partick Thistle (loan)	

==== Players out ====
Player	To	Date
(Scotland) Raeburn McLay	(Scotland) Johnstone	8 Aug 1914
(Scotland) Robert Bryson	(Scotland) Vale of Leven	20 Aug 1914
(Scotland) Thomas McConnell	(Scotland) Airdrie (loan)	30 Dec 1914
(Scotland) Charles Keir	(Scotland) Armadale	
(Scotland) James McDade	(Scotland) Dumbarton Harp	
(Scotland) Alex McGillivray	(Scotland) Johnstone	
(Scotland) David Slimmon	(Scotland) Kilmarnock	8 Aug 1914
(Scotland) John B Miller	(Scotland) Renton (loan)	

In addition James Blyth, Jack Brown, James Chalk, Alexander Clarkson, John Davie, Alex Forsyth, Archibald Frew, Harry Gildea, Samuel Hendry, Thomas Lawrie, William Murray, John Plank, Andrew Potter, John Robertson and Walter Wilson all played their final 'first XI' games in Dumbarton colours.

== Reserve Team ==
Dumbarton scratched from the competition at the second round stage of the Scottish Second XI Cup.
