= James Lister =

James Lister may refer to:

- Jim Lister (born 1981), Scottish footballer
- James Lister (basketball) (1951–2010), American basketball player
- James Lister (footballer, born 1895) (1895–?), Scottish footballer
- James Lister (politician) (born 1976), Australian politician
- James Frederick Lister (1843–1902), Canadian lawyer, judge, and politician
