= Raeside =

Raeside is a surname. Notable people with the surname include:

- Adrian Raeside (born 1957), cartoonist
- Jimmy Raeside (1880–1946), Scottish footballer
- Robbie Raeside (born 1972), Scottish footballer
- Thomas Raeside, Scottish footballer
- William Raeside (1892–1964), Scottish footballer and coach
