= John Brodie (disambiguation) =

John Brodie (1935–2026) was an American NFL quarterback.

John Brodie may also refer to:

- John Brodie (footballer, born 1862) (1862–1925), English International footballer
- John Brodie (footballer, born 1896) (1896–?), Scottish footballer
- John Brodie (footballer, born 1947), English footballer
- John Brodie (footballer, died 1901), Scottish footballer (Burnley FC, Nottingham Forest)
- John Alexander Brodie (1858–1934), British civil engineer
- John H. Brodie (1970–2006), theoretical physicist
- John Brodie (1905–1955), New Zealand writer who wrote as John Guthrie
