= John McCullough =

John McCullough is the name of:

- J. J. McCullough (John James McCullough), Canadian YouTuber
- John McCullough (actor) (1837–1885), American actor
- John McCullough (rugby union) (born 1936), New Zealand rugby football player
- John Alexander McCullough (1860–1947), New Zealand politician
- John G. McCullough (1835–1915), American politician and governor of Vermont
- John McCullough (basketball) (born 1956), American basketball player and coach
- John McCullough (poet) (born 1978), English poet
- John McCullough (c. 1949–2019), English murder victim

== See also ==
- John McCulloch (disambiguation)
