= John McCulloch (Scottish footballer) =

Scottish footballer

Personal information
- Full name: John McCulloch
- Place of birth: Scotland
- Position: Left back

Senior career*
Years	Team	Apps	(Gls)
- Vale of Clyde
1945–1954	Queen's Park	44	(0)
1956	Hibernian	0	(0)

International career
1952	Scotland Amateurs	1	(0)
- * Club domestic league appearances and goals

John McCulloch was a Scottish amateur football left back who played in the Scottish League for Queen's Park. He was capped by Scotland at amateur level.
