= John Durnin (Scottish footballer) =

Scottish footballer

Personal information
- Full name: John Durnin
- Date of birth: 11 October 1894
- Place of birth: Campbeltown, Scotland
- Position: Half back

Youth career
- Campbeltown A

Senior career*
Years	Team	Apps	(Gls)
1916–1917	Partick Thistle	23	(0)
1917–1919	Dumbarton	42	(3)
- * Club domestic league appearances and goals

John Durnin (born 10 November 1894) was a Scottish footballer who played for Partick Thistle and Dumbarton.
