= John McCulloch (cricketer) =

English cricketer

John Wyndham Hamilton McCulloch (4 December 1894 – 21 October 1915) was an English first-class cricketer active 1913–14 who played for Middlesex. He was born in Calcutta; died in Bailleul, Nord, France during World War I.
