= John W. Semple =

Canadian immunologist

John W. Semple is a Canadian/Swedish Scientist formally at St. Michael's Hospital and a Professor of Pharmacology at the University of Toronto. He is currently a Professor of Transfusion Medicine at Lund University in Sweden. He was born in Windsor, Ontario in 1959 and received his PhD in Immunology at Queen's University at Kingston, Ontario. In 1991, Semple, along with John Freedman, discovered a T helper cell defect in patients with the bleeding disorder called immune thrombocytopenia (ITP). ITP is a condition of having a low platelet count (thrombocytopenia) and most causes appear to be related to antibodies and T cells against platelets. Very low platelet counts can lead to a bleeding diathesis and purpura. The T cell defect was initially shown to be an exaggerated interleukin-2 response when T cells were cultured with platelets in vitro. Subsequently, this cytokine abnormality was shown by others to be responsible for many of the autoimmune mechanisms causing the disorder.). The importance of understanding the T cell defects in ITP is that novel therapies aimed at these cells may significantly benefit patients with ITP.
