= John McCulloch (footballer, born 1896) =

Scottish footballer

Personal information
- Full name: John Gray McCulloch
- Date of birth: 15 July 1896
- Place of birth: Rutherglen
- Date of death: 1935 (aged 38–39)
- Place of death: Motherwell, Scotland
- Position: Centre forward

Senior career*
Years	Team	Apps	(Gls)
- Vale of Clyde
1917–1918	Dumbarton	18	(13)
1918	Rangers	2	(1)
1921	Airdrieonians	1	(0)
- * Club domestic league appearances and goals

John Gray McCulloch (15 July 1896 – 1935) was a Scottish footballer who played for Dumbarton, Rangers and Airdrieonians.
