= John Brodie (footballer, born 1896) =

Scottish footballer

Personal information
- Date of birth: 5 January 1896
- Place of birth: Dumbarton, Scotland
- Position: Forward

Youth career
- Maryhill Juniors

Senior career*
Years	Team	Apps	(Gls)
1917–1919	Celtic	2	(1)
1917–1918	Ayr United (loan)	1	(0)
1917–1918	Dumbarton (loan)	1	(0)
1919–1920	Chelsea		
- * Club domestic league appearances and goals

John Brodie (born 5 January 1896) was a Scottish footballer who played for Celtic, Dumbarton, Ayr United and Chelsea.
