= Ted Garry =

Scottish footballer and manager

Personal information
- Full name: Edward Garry
- Date of birth: 7 March 1885
- Place of birth: Renton, Scotland
- Date of death: 28 May 1955 (aged 70)
- Place of death: Derby, England
- Position: Midfielder

Youth career
- Dumbarton Hibs

Senior career*
Years	Team	Apps	(Gls)
–1905	Galston		
1905–1907	Celtic	6	(1)
1905–1906	→ Ayr (loan)	17	(15)
1906–1907	→ Stenhousemuir (loan)		
1907–1917	Derby County		
1913–1914	→ Bradford (Park Avenue) A.F.C. (loan)		
1915–1917	Dumbarton (loan)	39	(3)

Managerial career
- 1922–1924: Espanyol
- * Club domestic league appearances and goals

Edward Garry (7 March 1885 – 28 May 1955) was a Scottish footballer and football manager.

He played for Galston, Celtic, and Derby County. He also had loan spells with Ayr, Stenhousemuir, Bradford (Park Avenue) A.F.C. and Dumbarton.

Garry later coached Espanyol of Spain.
