= Thomas Raeside =

Scottish footballer

Personal information
- Full name: Thomas Raeside
- Place of birth: Old Kilpatrick
- Position: Half back

Senior career*
Years	Team	Apps	(Gls)
1916–1921	Dumbarton	107	(4)
1920–1921	Bo'ness (loan)		
1921–1928	King's Park		
- * Club domestic league appearances and goals

Thomas Raeside was a Scottish football player, who played for Dumbarton and King's Park during the 1910s and 1920s. He also had a short loan spell with Bo'ness.
