= William Ritchie (footballer) =

Scottish footballer (born 1895)

Personal information
- Date of birth: 1895
- Place of birth: Renton, Scotland
- Position: Outside right

Senior career*
Years	Team	Apps	(Gls)
1915–1919	Dumbarton	121	(22)
1919–1920	Bury		
1922–1923	Grimsby Town		
- * Club domestic league appearances and goals

William M Ritchie (born 1895) was a Scottish footballer who played for Dumbarton, Bury and Grimsby Town.

His career was brought to an end in 1923 when he was implicated in a match fixing scandal from three years earlier when it was found Bury had accepted payments from Coventry City to prevent the latter's relegation, and Ritchie was banned for life along with several others.
