= John Semple (footballer) =

Scottish footballer

Personal information
- Full name: John Semple
- Date of birth: 28 May 1889
- Place of birth: Kirkintilloch, Scotland
- Position: Full back

Youth career
- Kirkintilloch Rob Roy

Senior career*
| Years | Team | Apps | (Gls) |
| 1914–1916 | Ayr United | 24 | (2) |
| 1916–1918 | Dumbarton | 35 | (1) |
| 1917–1920 | Ayr United | 87 | (0) |
| 1920–1921 | Luton Town | | |
- * Club domestic league appearances and goals

John Semple (born 28 May 1889) was a Scottish footballer who played for Ayr United, Dumbarton and Luton Town.
