= James Lister (footballer, born 1895) =

Scottish footballer

Jimmy Lister
Personal information
- Date of birth: 1895
- Place of birth: Glasgow, Scotland
- Date of death: ?
- Position: Centre forward

Senior career*
Years	Team	Apps	(Gls)
1915–1916	Rangers	5	(1)
1915	→ Renton (loan)		
1915–1916	→ Armadale (loan)		
1916–1917	Dumbarton	23	(13)
1917–1918	Morton	16	(8)
1918–1919	Rangers	0	(0)
1918–1919	→ Renton (loan)		
1919–1920	Bury		
1921–1922	Hartlepools United		
1923–1924	Bournemouth FC		
- * Club domestic league appearances and goals

James S. Lister (1895–?) is a Scottish former footballer who played for Rangers, Dumbarton, Morton, Bury, Hartlepools United and Bournemouth. He was a centre forward.
