= Alex McGregor (footballer, born 1896) =

Scottish footballer (1896–?)

Personal information
- Full name: Alexander McGregor
- Date of birth: 9 May 1896
- Place of birth: Renfrew, Scotland

Youth career
- Clydebank Juniors

Senior career*
Years	Team	Apps	(Gls)
1913–1915	Celtic	1	(0)
1914–1915	St Mirren	13	(0)
1914–1915	Dumbarton (loan)	32	(5)
1915–1918	Dumbarton	35	(10)
1917–1918	Clydebank (loan)	1	(0)
- * Club domestic league appearances and goals

Alexander McGregor (born 9 May 1896) was a Scottish footballer who played for Celtic, Dumbarton, St Mirren and Clydebank.
