= Archibald Ritchie (footballer, born 1894) =

Scottish footballer (1894–1973)

Personal information
- Full name: Archibald Ritchie
- Date of birth: 11 May 1894
- Place of birth: Stenhousemuir, Scotland
- Date of death: 24 November 1973 (aged 79)
- Place of death: Guildford, England
- Height: 5 ft 10 in (1.78 m)
- Position: Full back

Youth career
- Denny Hibernian

Senior career*
| Years | Team | Apps | (Gls) |
| 1912–1913 | Stenhousemuir | | |
| 1914–1919 | Dumbarton | 36 | (0) |
| 1919–1920 | Rangers | 21 | (0) |
| 1920–1921 | Derby County | | |
- * Club domestic league appearances and goals

Archibald Ritchie (11 May 1894 – 24 November 1973) was a Scottish footballer who played for Stenhousemuir, Dumbarton, Rangers and Derby County.
