= Johnstone Wanderers F.C. =

Former association football club in Scotland

Johnstone Wanderers
- Full name: Johnstone Wanderers Football Club
- Nickname(s): the Forkies, the Maroons
- Founded: 1885
- Dissolved: 1894
- Ground: Morgan Park
- Match secretary: Alex. Langlands
- President: Councillor Storrie
Home colours

Johnstone Wanderers Football Club, originally called Wanderers before 1891, was an association football club from Dundee, Scotland.

== History ==
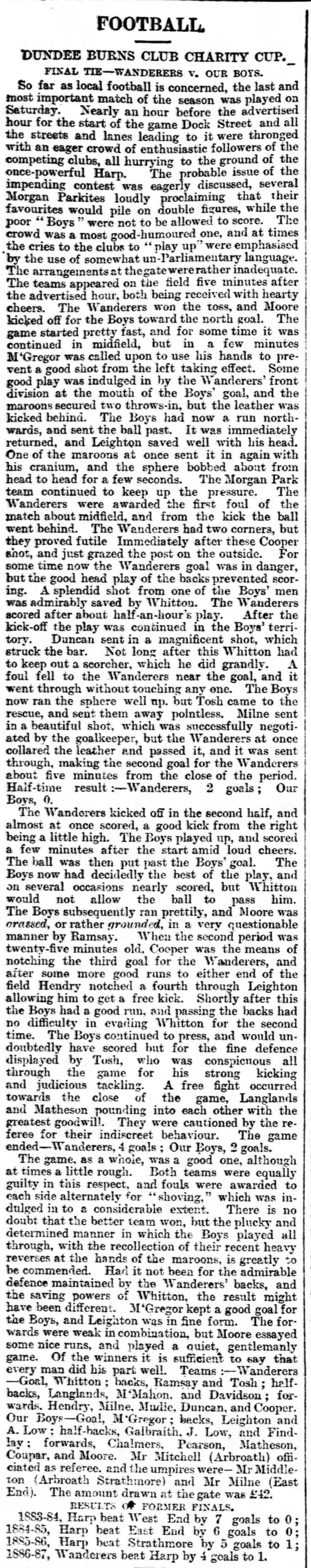
1887–88 Burns Cup Final, Wanderers 4–2 Our Boys (Dundee), Dundee Courier, May 14 1888

A dispute between the players and committee of the Dundee Our Boys club in 1885 resulted in a number of players deciding to quit the Our Boys club, and set up a new club, named Wanderers. The new club, having "forked off" the Our Boys, was nicknamed the Forkies as a result. Within a season it had 150 members, which made it equal in size with the long-established Strathmore.

=== First season and first silverware ===
The club joined the Scottish Football Association in August 1886, the name being recorded as Dundee Wanderers, although the club was officially called simply Wanderers. It played in the Scottish Cup and Forfarshire Cup from the 1886–87 season, being given an ostensibly easy tie in the national competition at home to Broughty, a club one-third of the Wanderers' size; the consequent "wholly unexpected" 7–2 defeat being such a shock to the crowd that it turned violent, and the referee walked off with 10 minutes to go (with the score 5–1) for his own safety. Christie of Forfar Athletic (who happened to be watching) retrieved the thrown-away whistle to complete the game. The club recovered quickly to beat East End 5–1 in the Forfarshire Cup the following week, but lost 3–2 to Forfar Athletic in the next round, having been two up at half time.

The Wanderers even finished the season with silverware, winning the Dundee Burns Club Charity Cup - a competition for the senior clubs in Dundee - by beating Harp, who had won the competition for the previous three seasons. 4,000 people (paying a gate of £27) watched the 9–1 win over East End in the semi-final, Over twice that number watched the final at West Craigie Park, which Wanderers won 4–1 after a "splendid game".

=== 1887–88: Scottish Cup quarter-finalists ===
The club's best run in the Scottish Cup came in the following season. In the first round it defeated Lochee 7–0. In the second round, the club was drawn to play at Aberdeen Rovers, but a financial inducement caused the Rovers to visit Morgan Park instead. Wanderers scored 7 goals in the first half and declared at 10; the Rovers were described as "a strong, heavy team" but lacking "combination" (teamwork). A 5–2 fifth-round win over Carfin Shamrock, despite being reduced to 10 men for the last half-an-hour through injury, put the club into the quarter-finals. The club received the worst draw possible, being drawn away to the Renton club which at the time was nigh-on unbeatable, and the Wanderers also lost half-back Stewart to injury before the game. Nevertheless, the Wanderers took the game to Renton and took the lead after four minutes, before the home side fought back with five unanswered goals. Wanderers' goalkeeper Whitton in particular drew admiration.

The club's run in the Forfarshire ended in a semi-final at Arbroath, which attracted a record crowd for Gayfield of over 4,000, and Arbroath - wearing a change kit of white - dominated, winning 6–1, despite losing Jocky Petrie to injury for the second half.

The club at least had ample consolation by retaining the Burns Charity Cup with a 4–2 win over Our Boys in the final, and a run to the semi-final of the Forfarshire, which included a 12–1 win over Broughty in the quarter-final; double figures were reached early in the second half, after which the Wanderers "seemed content to amuse themselves like a cat with a mouse". The club however lost 6–1 against Arbroath at Gayfield, in front of a record home crowd of 4,000, the home side (playing in its change kit of white) even withstanding the loss of Jocky Petrie through injury for the second half.

Wanderers finished the season by winning the Storrie Cup, the reward for a one-off match against Strathmore for a "handsome cup" presented by Wanderers' President Councillor Storrie; the Wanderers won 5–2 and nearly £15 gate money was given to charity.

The club reached the final of the Burns Cup again in 1888–89, but after playing off a draw against Harp, the clubs refused to turn up to the replay unless guaranteed a third of the gate money each. As the Forfarshire Association refused, the clubs played out a friendly at East Dock Street, which Wanderers won 3–0, to claim the Cup unofficially.

=== Johnstone Wanderers ===
In March 1891, the club changed its name to Johnstone Wanderers, and moved to Clepington Park. The club reached the Forfarshire Cup semi-final in 1892–93 and 1893–94, but lost in the semi-final both times.

It was originally one of the 12 founder members of the Northern League in 1891, but at a subsequent meeting the members reduced the number of clubs for the first season to 8, of which 3 were to come from Dundee; Our Boys and East End were unanimously acclaimed as members, and Harp defeated Wanderers 14–6 in a ballot for the final place.

The Scottish FA introduced preliminary rounds for the Scottish Cup from 1891–92, but the club was unable to win through the qualifying rounds to the first round proper. The formation of the Scottish League and the legalization of professionalism made it very difficult for the other clubs in Dundee to survive, although there was still a local appetite for the game.

=== Merger with Strathmore ===
The club finally joined the Northern League in 1892–93, and finished seventh out of ten. After six matches in the 1893–94 season, both Wanderers and Strathmore announced their resignations from the Northern League, on the basis that the gate money for matches at Montrose and Victoria United of Aberdeen was not worth the candle; the Strathie was facing eviction as the Dundee F.C. committee had bought out its ground, and had been looking to share Clepington Park which led to an assumption that the Wanderers and Strathmore were effectively acting as one club. That suspicion was confirmed in January 1894 when a new club, Dundonians, was formed by merger between the Wanderers and Strathmore, and played its first match under that name against Hibernian that month. As the media often referred to the Dundee club as "the Dundonians", Dundee made a formal objection, and the new club instead used the Wanderers name, usually referred to as Dundee Wanderers.

== Colours ==
The club originally played in maroon jerseys with a royal blue sash, and dark blue knickers with a red stripe. In 1892, the club changed to maroon and white hoops, and the newly merged club changed again to red and white jerseys with blue knickers.

== Grounds ==
The club originally played at Morgan Park, off Mains Loan. In 1891 it moved to Clepington Park after a rent dispute with Morgan Park's owner Alexander Batchelor.

== Honours ==
Burns Charity Cup

- 1886–87, 1887–88, (unofficially) 1888–89

Storrie Cup

- 1887–88
