= Stonehaven F.C. (1890) =

Former association football club in Scotland

Stonehaven
- Full name: Stonehaven F.C.
- Founded: 1890
- Dissolved: 1899
- Ground: Urie Ground
- President: J. S. Crawford
- Match Secretary: John Leslie, D. Shireffs
Home colours

Stonehaven Football Club was an association football club from Stonehaven in Kincardineshire, active in the 1890s.

== History ==
The club was founded in around 1890; its earliest recorded fixture is a 2–1 win over Caledonian (Aberdeen) in August 1890. The club played in the Aberdeenshire Cup for the first time in 1890–91, beating Aberdeen Thistle in its first tie by 8 goals to 1, described as "a surprise to the spectators, to the Thistle, and above all to the winning team". In the semi-final, Caledonian exacted a brutal revenge for the season-opening friendly, winning 11–0 on an ice-bound Aberdeen pitch; Stonehaven rather desperately put in a protest about the state of the ground.

Despite this sobering defeat, the club joined the Scottish Football Association in 1891 and made its Scottish Cup debut in the first qualifying round in 1891–92, at home to Bon Accord, which was (in)famous for its world record defeat to Arbroath six years before. The Bons outclassed the home side, turning around at half-time 4–0 up and finishing with a 9–0 win.

The blame was put in part on some of its players preferring to play in the closing cricket season fixtures, hence having a goal difference of –17 after two matches, and the club recovered enough to lose only by 4 goals to 2 to Aberdeen in the Aberdeenshire Cup in October. However the club's true status was emphasized with a 15–0 defeat at Montrose the following month.

The following season the club was not ready for the first qualifying round in the Scottish Cup, and so scratched to Peterhead. The club's opening match of the season was a 13–2 defeat at home to Victoria United and in November it lost 13–0 to Orion in the first round of the Aberdeenshire Cup; while the Orion had been preparing by going for three mile runs twice per week, Stonehaven had not trained at all.

Faced with such apathy from players and spectators alike, the club did not play senior football after 1892–93. After moving to Glenury in 1899, it only seems to have played one match, before dissolving.

== Colours ==
The club played in white shirts, with blue (serge) knickers in 1892–93 and white knickers in 1893–94.

== Ground ==
The club's ground was described as "Urie" or "the Urie Ground", perhaps referring to Urie Crescent, on the northern outskirts of the town. In 1899 the club moved to a new ground, Glenury, opened with a match against Melrose of Aberdeen. The ground became the home of the Stonehaven F.C. junior club.
