= 1885–86 Scottish Cup =

Scottish Cup
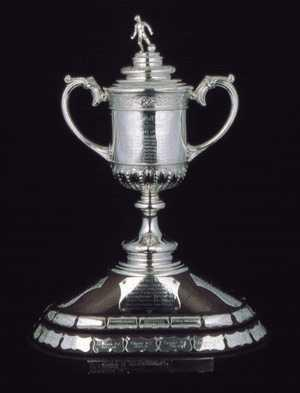
- The Scottish Cup trophy

Tournament details
- Country: Scotland
- Teams: 134

Final positions
- Champions: Queen's Park (Eighth title)
- Runners-up: Renton

Tournament statistics
- Matches played: 146
- Goals scored: 881 (6.03 per match)

The 1885–86 Scottish Cup was the 13th season of Scotland's most prestigious football knockout competition. Queen's Park won the competition for the eighth time after they beat defending champions Renton 3–1 in the final.

Arbroath set a world record in the first round when they defeated Bon Accord 36–0 on 12 September 1885. The score remains a record in British senior football and globally for a match that was not fixed or thrown. Coincidentally, on the same day, Dundee Harp recorded an equally one-sided victory as they beat Aberdeen Rovers 35–0.

== Calendar ==
Round	First match date	Fixtures			Clubs
Round	First match date	Original	Byes	Replays	Clubs
First Round	5 September 1885	65	4	11	134 → 70
Second Round	3 October 1885	33	4	9	70 → 37
Third Round	24 October 1885	17	1	1	37 → 19
Fourth Round	14 November 1885	9	1	2	19 → 10
Fifth Round	5 December 1885	5	0	4	10 → 5
Quarter-finals	16 January 1886	1	3	0	5 → 4
Semi-finals	16 January 1886	2	0	0	4 → 2
Final	13 February 1886	1	0	0	2 → 1

- Two teams qualified for the second round after drawing their first round replay.

== Teams ==
All 134 teams entered the competition in the first round.

Ayrshire	Dunbartonshire	Glasgow and Suburbs	Lanarkshire	Renfrewshire
Annbank; Ayr; Ayr Rovers; Cumnock; Dalry; Hurlford; Kilmarnock; Lanemark; Lugar Boswell; Mauchline; Maybole; Monkcastle	Albion; Bonhill; Dumbarton; Dumbarton Athletic; Dumbarton Union; Dunbritton; Helensburgh; Jamestown; Kirkintilloch Athletic; Lenzie; Levendale; Renton; Rock; Vale of Leven; Vale of Leven Wanderers; Yoker	Battlefield; Cambridge; Clyde; Cowlairs; Dennistoun Athletic; Eastern; Glasgow United YMCA; Granton; Linthouse; Northern; Partick; Partick Thistle; Pilgrims; Pollokshields Athletic; Queen's Park; Rangers; St Andrew's; St Peter's; Shawlands; Southern Athletic; Thistle; Westbourne; Whitefield; 3rd Lanark RV; 10th Lanark RV	Airdrieonians; Albion Rovers; Alpha; Cambuslang; Cambuslang Hibernian; Clydesdale; Drumpellier; Dykehead; Hamilton Academical; Royal Albert; Rutherglen; Shettleston; Tollcross; West Benhar; Wishaw Swifts	Abercorn; Arthurlie; Cartvale; Greenock Northern; Greenock Rangers; Greenock Southern; Johnstone; Mearns Athletic; Morton; Neilston; Olympic; Paisley Hibernian; Port Glasgow Athletic; Renfrew; St Mirren; Thornliebank; Woodvale; 1st Renfrew RV
Edinburghshire	Fife and Perthshire	Northern Counties	Southern Counties	Stirlingshire
Bo'ness; Broxburn Shamrock; Edina; Glencairn; Heart of Midlothian; Hibernian; Newcastleton; Norton Park; St Bernard's; West Calder	Breadalbane; Cowdenbeath; Crieff; Dunblane; Dunfermline; Dunfermline Athletic; Oban; Vale of Teith	Aberdeen; Aberdeen Rovers; Angus; Arbroath; Bon Accord; Broughty; Coupar Angus; Dundee East End; Dundee Harp; Dundee Our Boys; Dundee West End; Forfar Athletic; Strathmore (Arbroath); Strathmore (Dundee)	Moffat; Queen of the South Wanderers; Thornhill; Vale of Nith; 5th Kirkcudbrightshire RV	Alloa Athletic; Avondale; Camelon; Campsie; Campsie Central; Dunipace; East Stirlingshire; Falkirk; Grahamston; Grasshoppers; King's Park

== First round ==
=== Matches ===
==== Glasgow and Suburbs ====
Pilgrims received a bye to the second round.

29 August 1885	Queen's Park	16–0	St Peter's	Crosshill
				Stadium: Hampden Park

12 September 1885	Cambridge	3–1 (Void)	Southern Athletic	Glasgow

12 September 1885	Clyde	1–0	Rangers	Glasgow
				Stadium: Barrowfield Park; Attendance: 1,500

12 September 1885	Whitefield	3–1	Dennistoun Athletic	Govan
				Stadium: Whitefield Park

12 September 1885	3rd Lanark RV	9–1	Shawlands	Crosshill
				Stadium: Cathkin Park

12 September 1885	Thistle	11–1	Westbourne	Glasgow
				Stadium: Beechwood Park

12 September 1885	Battlefield	0–2	Cowlairs	Kinning Park
				Stadium: Kinning Park

12 September 1885	Partick Thistle	11–0	Granton	Partick
				Stadium: Inchview

12 September 1885	Northern	4–1	Linthouse	Glasgow
				Stadium: Hyde Park

Glasgow United YMCA	w/o	Eastern Athletic

Pollokshields Athletic	w/o	Partick

St Andrew's	w/o	10th Lanark RV

==== Renfrewshire district ====
12 September 1885	Johnstone	5–1	Greenock Rangers	Johnstone
				Stadium: Cartbank Park

12 September 1885	Mearns Athletic	2–3	Woodvale	Newton Mearns

12 September 1885	Cartvale	2–1	Morton	Busby
				Stadium: Cartbridge Park

12 September 1885	Renfrew	1–0	Greenock Northern	Renfrew
				Stadium: Glebe Park

12 September 1885	Greenock Southern	1–11	Neilston	Greenock
				Stadium: Berrylands Park

12 September 1885	Port Glasgow Athletic	4–1	1st Renfrew RV	Port Glasgow
	McMinn; McKerrol			Stadium: Clune Park

12 September 1885	Paisley Hibernian	2–2	Thornliebank	Paisley
				Stadium: Murray Street

19 September 1885	Abercorn	2–0	St Mirren	Paisley
				Stadium: Blackstoun Park

Arthurlie	w/o	Olympic

==== Ayrshire district ====
12 September 1885	Ayr	7–0	Maybole	Ayr
				Stadium: Beresford Park

12 September 1885	Lanemark	4–1 (Void)	Monkcastle	New Cumnock
				Stadium: Connell Park

12 September 1885	Ayr Rovers	0–8	Dalry	Ayr
				Stadium: Ayr Racecourse

12 September 1885	Hurlford	5–1	Cumnock	Hurlford
				Stadium: Drumbiehill Park

12 September 1885	Kilmarnock	7–1	Annbank	Kilmarnock
				Stadium: Rugby Park

12 September 1885	Mauchline	2–3	Lugar Boswell	Mauchline
				Stadium: Connel Park

==== Dunbartonshire district ====
12 September 1885	Lenzie	1–1	Bonhill	Lenzie
				Stadium: Lenzie Football Field

12 September 1885	Albion	4–4	Jamestown	Dumbarton
				Stadium: Victoria Park

12 September 1885	Yoker	5–1 (Void)	Dumbarton Union	Dalmuir
				Stadium: Castle Park

12 September 1885	Kirkintilloch Athletic	0–14	Renton	Kirkintilloch
				Stadium: Townhead Park

12 September 1885	Helensburgh	Not played	Dumbarton Athletic	Helensburgh
				Stadium: Ardencaple Park

19 September 1885	Dumbarton	3–1	Vale of Leven Wanderers	Dumbarton
	Wilson; Lindsay; Hartley			Stadium: Boghead Park; Attendance: 500

Vale of Leven	w/o	Dunbritton

Levendale	w/o	Rock

==== Edinburghshire district ====
5 September 1885	Hibernian	9–0	Edina	Edinburgh
				Stadium: Hibernian Park

12 September 1885	Broxburn Shamrock	1–1	Bo'ness	Broxburn
				Stadium: Easter Park

12 September 1885	Norton Park	6–2	Glencairn	Edinburgh
				Stadium: Norton Park

12 September 1885	Heart of Midlothian	5–2 (Void)	St Bernard's	Edinburgh
				Stadium: Tyncastle Fields

West Calder	w/o	Newcastleton

==== Stirlingshire district ====
Alloa Athletic received a bye to the second round.

12 September 1885	East Stirlingshire	6–1	Campsie	Falkirk
				Stadium: Randyford Park

12 September 1885	Camelon	1–3	Falkirk	Camelon
				Stadium: Victoria Park

12 September 1885	King's Park	3–1	Avondale	Stirling
				Stadium: Forthbank Park

12 September 1885	Grasshoppers	2–2	Grahamston	Bonnybridge
				Stadium: Peathill Park

12 September 1885	Dunipace	4–2	Campsie Central	Denny
				Stadium: Broomhill Farm

==== Lanarkshire district ====
Dykehead received a bye to the second round.

12 September 1885	Alpha	6–8	Cambuslang Hibernian	Motherwell
				Stadium: Roman Road Park

12 September 1885	Clydesdale	2–4	Tollcross	Rutherglen
				Stadium: South Croft Park

12 September 1885	Rutherglen	0–2	Wishaw Swifts	Rutherglen
				Stadium: Phoenix Park

12 September 1885	Shettleston	1–7	Cambuslang	Glasgow

12 September 1885	Albion Rovers	6–2	Drumpellier	Coatbridge
				Stadium: Meadow Park

26 September 1885	Airdrieonians	4–2	Royal Albert	Airdrie
				Stadium: Mavisbank Park

Hamilton Academical	w/o	West Benhar

==== Northern Counties ====
12 September 1885	Forfar Athletic	3–1	Angus	Forfar
				Stadium: Station Park

12 September 1885	Arbroath	36–0	Bon Accord	Arbroath
	Petrie (x13); Munro (x7); Robertson (x6); Crawford (x6); Marshall (x2); Tackett (x2)			Stadium: Gayfield Park; Referee: Dave Stormont

12 September 1885	Dundee Harp	35–0	Aberdeen Rovers	Dundee
	D'Arcy Jr. (x10); McGirl (x6); Murphy (x5); Murray (x4); Rock (x3); Lees (x3); Neil (x3); D'Arcy Sr.			Stadium: East Dock Street

12 September 1885	Strathmore (Arbroath)	7–0	Aberdeen	Arbroath
				Stadium: Darnley Park

12 September 1885	Dundee West End	3–3	Broughty	Dundee
				Stadium: Boghead

12 September 1885	Dundee East End	3–3	Strathmore (Dundee)	Dundee
				Stadium: Madeira Park

12 September 1885	Dundee Our Boys	4–2	Coupar Angus	Dundee
				Stadium: West Craigie Park

==== Fife and Perthshire district ====
12 September 1885	Vale of Teith	9–1	Oban	Doune
				Stadium: Tullochan Knowe

12 September 1885	Crieff	0–7	Dunfermline Athletic	Crieff
				Stadium: Market Park

Cowdenbeath	w/o	Breadalbane

Dunblane	w/o	Dunfermline

==== Southern Counties ====
Queen of the South Wanderers received a bye to the second round.

12 September 1885	5th Kirkcudbrightshire RV	4–0	Vale of Nith	Dumfries
				Stadium: Palmerston Park

Thornhill	w/o	Moffat

=== Replays ===
==== Glasgow and Suburbs ====
26 September 1885	Southern Athletic	1–2	Cambridge	Strathbungo
				Stadium: Moray Park

==== Renfrewshire district ====
19 September 1885	Thornliebank	2–0	Paisley Hibernian	Thornliebank
				Stadium: Deacon's Bank Park

==== Ayrshire district ====
26 September 1885	Monkcastle	2–0	Lanemark	Kilwinning
				Stadium: Claremont Park

==== Dunbartonshire district ====
19 September 1885	Bonhill	6–0	Lenzie	Bonhill
				Stadium: Croft Loan Park

19 September 1885	Jamestown	0–1	Albion	Jamestown
				Stadium: Balloch Road

26 September 1885	Dumbarton Union	1–0	Yoker	Dumbarton
				Stadium: Burnside Park

26 September 1885	Helensburgh	2–3	Dumbarton Athletic	Helensburgh
				Stadium: Ardencaple Park

==== Edinburghshire district ====
19 September 1885	Bo'ness	5–1	Broxburn Shamrock	Bo'ness
				Stadium: Soocrae Park

26 September 1885	Heart of Midlothian	1–0	St Bernard's	Edinburgh
				Stadium: Tyncastle Field

==== Stirlingshire district ====
19 September 1885	Grahamston	2–4	Grasshoppers	Grahamston
				Stadium: Crichton Park

==== Northern Counties ====
19 September 1885	Broughty	3–3	Dundee West End	Broughty Ferry
				Stadium: Forthill Park

19 September 1885	Strathmore (Dundee)	1–4	Dundee East End	Dundee
				Stadium: Rollo's Pier

Notes

1. A-A protest by Southern Athletic was upheld and a replay was ordered.
2. B-A protest by Monkcastle was upheld and a replay was ordered.
3. C-A protest by Dumbarton Union was upheld and a replay was ordered.
4. D-A protest by Dumbarton Athletic over the height of the goal posts was upheld and a replay was ordered.
5. E-A protest by St Bernard's was upheld and a replay was ordered.
6. F-Both teams qualified for the second round.

== Second round ==
=== Matches ===
==== Glasgow and Suburbs ====
Partick Thistle received a bye to the third round.

3 October 1885	Queen's Park	1–0	Pilgrims	Crosshill
				Stadium: Hampden Park

3 October 1885	Cowlairs	3–2	Pollokshields Athletic	Glasgow
				Stadium: Gourlay Park

3 October 1885	Clyde	2–3	Thistle	Glasgow
				Stadium: Barrowfield Park

3 October 1885	St Andrew's	6–0	Cambridge	Pollokshields
				Stadium: Lorne Park

3 October 1885	Northern	7–2	Whitefield	Glasgow
				Stadium: Hyde Park

3 October 1885	Glasgow United YMCA	1–8	3rd Lanark RV	Glasgow
				Stadium: Kelburne Street

==== Renfrewshire district ====
Cartvale received a bye to the third round.

3 October 1885	Renfrew	0–3	Abercorn	Renfrew
				Stadium: Glebe Park

3 October 1885	Johnstone	1–2	Thornliebank	Johnstone
				Stadium: Cartbank Park

3 October 1885	Arthurlie	2–0	Woodvale	Barrhead
				Stadium: Dunterlie Park

3 October 1885	Port Glasgow Athletic	1–1	Neilston	Port Glasgow
	McKerrol			Stadium: Clune Park

==== Ayrshire district ====
3 October 1885	Monkcastle	2–4	Ayr	Kilwinning
				Stadium: Claremont Park

3 October 1885	Dalry	6–2	Lugar Boswell	Dalry
				Stadium: Bleezepark

3 October 1885	Kilmarnock	3–4 (Void)	Hurlford	Kilmarnock
				Stadium: Rugby Park

==== Dunbartonshire district ====
3 October 1885	Dumbarton	7–0	Dumbarton Union	Dumbarton
				Stadium: Boghead Park

3 October 1885	Dumbarton Athletic	2–7	Renton	Dumbarton
				Stadium: Burnside Park

3 October 1885	Vale of Leven	10–0	Bonhill	Alexandria
				Stadium: North Street Park

Dumbarton Rock	w/o	Albion

==== Edinburghshire district ====
West Calder received a bye to the third round.

3 October 1885	Bo'ness	7–1	Norton Park	Bo'ness
				Stadium: Soocrae Park

3 October 1885	Hibernian	2–1	Heart of Midlothian	Edinburgh
	McGhee (x2)			Stadium: Hibernian Park; Attendance: 4,000

==== Stirlingshire district ====
3 October 1885	Grasshoppers	1–6	East Stirlingshire	Bonnybridge
				Stadium: Peathill Park

3 October 1885	King's Park	7–1	Dunipace	Stirling
				Stadium: Forthbank Park

3 October 1885	Falkirk	0–4	Alloa Athletic	Falkirk
				Stadium: Brockville Park

==== Lanarkshire district ====
3 October 1885	Albion Rovers	2–2	Wishaw Swifts	Coatbridge
				Stadium: Meadow Park

3 October 1885	Airdrieonians	15–2	Cambuslang Hibernian	Airdrie
				Stadium: Mavisbank Park

3 October 1885	Dykehead	3–1	Tollcross	Shotts
				Stadium: Youngson's Park

Hamilton Academical	w/o	Cambuslang

==== Northern Counties ====
3 October 1885	Dundee West End	4–5	Strathmore (Arbroath)	Dundee
				Stadium: Boghead

3 October 1885	Arbroath	9–1	Forfar Athletic	Arbroath
				Stadium: Gayfield Park

3 October 1885	Dundee Harp	4–1	Dundee Our Boys	Dundee
				Stadium: East Dock Street

3 October 1885	Dundee East End	2–2	Broughty	Dundee
				Stadium: Madeira Park

==== Fife and Perthshire ====
3 October 1885	Dunblane	10–0	Dunfermline Athletic	Dunblane
				Stadium: Kippencross Park

Vale of Teith	w/o	Cowdenbeath

==== Southern Counties ====
Thornhill received a bye to the third round.

3 October 1885	5th Kirkcudbrightshire RV	3–1 (Void)	Queen of the South Wanderers	Dumfries
				Stadium: Palmerston Park

=== Replays ===
==== Renfrewshire district ====
10 October 1885	Neilston	0–2	Port Glasgow Athletic	Neilston
			McKerrol	Stadium: Nether Kirton Park

==== Ayrshire district ====
17 October 1885	Kilmarnock	1–1	Hurlford	Kilmarnock
				Stadium: Rugby Park

==== Lanarkshire district ====
10 October 1885	Wishaw Swifts	5–0	Albion Rovers	Wishaw
				Stadium: Academy Park

==== Northern Counties ====
10 October 1885	Broughty	3–8 (Void)	Dundee East End	Broughty Ferry
				Stadium: Forthill Park

==== Southern Counties ====
17 October 1885	Queen of the South Wanderers	4–3	5th Kirkcudbrightshire RV	Dumfries
				Stadium: Nunholm

=== Second Replays ===
==== Ayrshire district ====
24 October 1885	Kilmarnock	Not played	Hurlford	Kilmarnock
				Stadium: Rugby Park

==== Northern Counties ====
17 October 1885	Broughty	1–2	Dundee East End	Broughty Ferry
				Stadium: Forthill Park

=== Third replay ===
==== Ayrshire district ====
31 October 1885	Kilmarnock	1–1	Hurlford	Ayr
				Stadium: Springvale Park

=== Fourth Replay ===
==== Ayrshire district ====
7 November 1885	Hurlford	2–2 (a.e.t.)	Kilmarnock	Hurlford
				Stadium: Drumbiehill Park; Attendance: 2,000

=== Fifth Replay ===
==== Ayrshire district ====
14 November 1885	Kilmarnock	1–5	Hurlford	Kilmarnock
				Stadium: Rugby Park

Notes

1. G-A protest by Kilmarnock was upheld and a replay was ordered.
2. H-Dykehead were disqualified and Tollcross re-instated.
3. I-A protest by Queen of the South Wanderers was upheld and a replay was ordered.
4. J-A protest by Broughty was upheld and a further replay was ordered.
5. K-Kilmarnock failed to appear and a further replay was ordered.

== Third round ==
=== Matches ===
==== Glasgow, Dunbartonshire and Stirlingshire district ====
24 October 1885	Alloa Athletic	0–12	Partick Thistle	Alloa
				Stadium: Gaberston Park

24 October 1885	Cowlairs	2–1	Northern	Glasgow
				Stadium: Gourlay Park

24 October 1885	East Stirlingshire	0–3	Queen's Park	Falkirk
				Stadium: Randyford Park

24 October 1885	Dumbarton	3–0	Thistle	Dumbarton
	Tait; Liddell; Brown			Stadium: Boghead Park

24 October 1885	Albion	0–1	Renton	Dumbarton
				Stadium: Victoria Park

31 October 1885	3rd Lanark RV	11–0	St Andrew's	Crosshill
				Stadium: Cathkin Park

Vale of Leven	w/o	King's Park

==== Renfrewshire and Ayrshire district ====
24 October 1885	Cartvale	1–1	Port Glasgow Athletic	Busby
				Stadium: Cartbridge Park

24 October 1885	Dalry	1–6	Ayr	Dalry
				Stadium: Bleezepark

24 October 1885	Thornliebank	1–5	Abercorn	Thornliebank
				Stadium: Deacon's Bank Park

21 November 1885	Arthurlie	5–0	Hurlford	Barrhead
				Stadium: Dunterlie Park

==== Lanarkshire and Edinburghshire district ====
Cambuslang received a bye to the fourth round.

24 October 1885	Wishaw Swifts	3–0	West Calder	Wishaw
				Stadium: Academy Park

24 October 1885	Hibernian	6–0	Bo'ness	Edinburgh
				Stadium: Hibernian Park; Attendance: 2,000

24 October 1885	Airdrieonians	8–2	Tollcross	Airdrie
				Stadium: Mavisbank Park

==== Northern Counties, Fife and Perthshire district ====
24 October 1885	Strathmore (Arbroath)	3–1	Dunblane	Arbroath
				Stadium: Darnley Park

24 October 1885	Arbroath	7–1	Dundee East End	Arbroath
				Stadium: Gayfield Park

24 October 1885	Dundee Harp	8–1	Vale of Teith	Dundee
				Stadium: East Dock Street

==== Southern Counties ====
24 October 1885	Queen of the South Wanderers	8–0	Thornhill	Dumfries
				Stadium: Nunholm

=== Replay ===
==== Renfrewshire and Ayrshire district ====
31 October 1885	Port Glasgow	4–2	Cartvale	Port Glasgow
	Hunter (x2); Ruiglan			Stadium: Clune Park

== Fourth round ==
Port Glasgow Athletic received a bye to the fifth round.

=== Matches ===
14 November 1885	Dumbarton	3–0	Partick Thistle	Dumbarton
	Lindsay; Aitken (x2)			Stadium: Boghead Park

14 November 1885	Cambuslang	9–0	Wishaw Swifts	Cambuslang
				Stadium: Westburn Park

14 November 1885	Hibernian	5–3	Arbroath	Edinburgh
	McGinn; McGhee (x2); Cox; Philbin			Stadium: Hibernian Park; Attendance: 1,500

14 November 1885	Renton	4–0	Cowlairs	Renton
				Stadium: Tontine Park

14 November 1885	Queen's Park	1–0	Airdrieonians	Crosshill
				Stadium: Hampden Park

14 November 1885	3rd Lanark RV	3–2 (Void)	Ayr	Crosshill
				Stadium: Cathkin Park

14 November 1885	Abercorn	7–2	Strathmore (Arbroath)	Paisley
				Stadium: Blackstoun Park

14 November 1885	Vale of Leven	6–0	Dundee Harp	Alexandria
				Stadium: North Street Park

28 November 1885	Queen of the South Wanderers	1–3	Arthurlie	Dumfries
				Stadium: Nunholm

=== Replay ===
28 November 1885	Ayr	3–3	3rd Lanark RV	Ayr
				Stadium: Beresford Park

=== Second replay ===
5 December 1885	3rd Lanark RV	5–1	Ayr	Crosshill
				Stadium: Cathkin Park

Notes

1. L-A protest by Ayr was upheld and a replay was ordered.

== Fifth round ==
=== Matches ===
5 December 1885	Renton	2–2	Vale of Leven	Renton
				Stadium: Tontine Park

5 December 1885	Arthurlie	1–2	Queen's Park	Barrhead
				Stadium: Dunterlie Park

5 December 1885	Abercorn	0–1	Cambuslang	Paisley
				Stadium: Blackstoun Park

5 December 1885	Dumbarton	2–2	Hibernian	Dumbarton
	Brown; Own goal		McGhee; Smith	Stadium: Boghead Park; Attendance: 2,000

12 December 1885	3rd Lanark RV	1–1	Port Glasgow Athletic	Crosshill
				Stadium: Cathkin Park

=== Replays ===
12 December 1885	Vale of Leven	0–3	Renton	Alexandria
				Stadium: North Street Park

12 December 1885	Hibernian	4–3	Dumbarton	Edinburgh
	Preston; Clarke; McGhee (x2)		Hartley (x2); Brown	Stadium: Hibernian Park; Attendance: 5,500

19 December 1885	Port Glasgow Athletic	1–1	3rd Lanark RV	Port Glasgow
	Hunter			Stadium: Clune Park

=== Second replay ===
26 December 1885	3rd Lanark RV	4–1	Port Glasgow Athletic	Crosshill
				Stadium: Cathkin Park

== Quarter-finals ==
Queen's Park, Renton and 3rd Lanark RV received a bye to the semi-finals.

=== Match ===
16 January 1886	Hibernian	3–2	Cambuslang	Edinburgh
	McLaren; Lafferty; McGhee			Stadium: Hibernian Park; Attendance: 4,000

== Semi-finals ==
=== Matches ===
16 January 1886	3rd Lanark RV	0–3	Queen's Park	Crosshill
				Stadium: Cathkin Park

23 January 1886	Hibernian	0–2	Renton	Edinburgh
				Stadium: Hibernian Park; Attendance: 5,000

== Final ==
13 February 1886
15:00

Queens Park	3–1	Renton
Lambie 10'; Harrower; Christie	Report	Kelso

Cathkin Park, Crosshill
Attendance: 7,000

== See also ==
- 1885–86 in Scottish football
