= 1898–99 in Scottish football =

Football in Scotland
- Season: 1898–99

1898–99 in Scottish football

Division One champions
- Rangers

Division Two champions
- Kilmarnock

Scottish Cup winners
- Celtic

Junior Cup winners
- Parkhead

Scotland national team
- 1899 BHC

1898–99 in Scottish football was the 26th season of competitive football in Scotland and the ninth season of the Scottish Football League.

== League competitions ==
=== Scottish Division One ===
Rangers were champions of the Scottish Division One.

Pos	Team	Pld	W	D	L	GF	GA	GD	Pts	Qualification or relegation
1	Rangers (C)	18	18	0	0	79	18	+61	36	Champions
2	Heart of Midlothian	18	12	2	4	56	30	+26	26	
3	Celtic	18	11	2	5	51	33	+18	24	
4	Hibernian	18	10	3	5	42	43	−1	23	
5	St Mirren	18	8	4	6	46	32	+14	20	
6	Third Lanark	18	7	3	8	33	38	−5	17	
7	Clyde	18	4	4	10	23	48	−25	12	
7	St Bernard's	18	4	4	10	30	37	−7	12	
9	Partick Thistle (R)	18	2	2	14	19	58	−39	6	Relegated to the 1899–1900 Scottish Division Two
10	Dundee	18	1	2	15	23	65	−42	4	

Source: statto.com
Rules for classification: Teams finish equal if level on points. Points system: 2 points for a win, 1 point for a draw, 0 points for a loss
(C) Champions; (R) Relegated

=== Scottish Division Two ===
Kilmarnock won the Scottish Division Two for the second season in a row.

Pos	Team	Pld	W	D	L	GF	GA	GD	Pts	Promotion or relegation
1	Kilmarnock (C, P)	18	14	4	0	73	24	+49	32	Elected to the 1899–1900 Scottish First Division
2	Leith Athletic	18	12	3	3	63	38	+25	27	
3	Port Glasgow Athletic	18	12	1	5	75	51	+24	25	
4	Motherwell	18	7	6	5	41	40	+1	20	
5	Airdrieonians	18	6	3	9	36	46	−10	15	
5	Hamilton Academical	18	7	1	10	48	58	−10	15	
7	Ayr	18	5	3	10	35	51	−16	13	
7	Morton	18	6	1	11	36	42	−6	13	
9	Linthouse	18	5	1	12	29	62	−33	11	
10	Abercorn	18	4	1	13	41	65	−24	9	

Rules for classification: Teams finish equal if level on points. Points system: 2 points for a win, 1 point for a draw, 0 points for a loss.
(C) Champions; (P) Promoted

== Other honours ==
=== Cup honours ===
==== National ====
Competition	Winner	Score	Runner-up
Scottish Cup	Celtic	2 – 0	Rangers
Scottish Qualifying Cup	East Stirlingshire	4 – 1	Arthurlie
Scottish Junior Cup	Parkhead	4 – 1	Westmarch XI

==== County ====
Competition	Winner	Score	Runner-up
Aberdeenshire Cup	Orion	5 – 1 (Note: Replay needed.)	Victoria United
Ayrshire Cup	Kilmarnock	6 – 3	Galston
Border Cup	Vale of Leithen	3 – 1 (Note: Second replay needed.)	Selkirk
Dumbartonshire Cup	Dumbarton	6 – 3	Renton
East of Scotland Shield	Hearts	1 – 0	Hibernian
Fife Cup	Raith Rovers	2 – 0	Lochgelly United
Forfarshire Cup	Arbroath	4 – 2	Dundee Wanderers
Glasgow Cup	Queen's Park	1 – 0	Rangers
Lanarkshire Cup	Motherwell	3 – 0	Albion Rovers
Linlithgowshire Cup	Bo'ness	2 – 1	Bathgate
North of Scotland Cup	Elgin City	2 – 1	Clachnacuddin
Perthshire Cup	Fair City Athletic	5 – 2	Vale of Atholl
Renfrewshire Cup	Morton	2 – 0	St Mirren
Southern Counties Cup	Dumfries	4 – 1	Newton Stewart Athletic
Stirlingshire Cup	King's Park	4 – 2	Camelon

=== Non-league honours ===
Highland League

Top three
Pos	Team	Pld	W	D	L	GF	GA	GD	Pts
1	Inverness Caledonian	14	11	2	1	39	14	+25	24
2	Clachnacuddin	14	9	3	2	48	25	+23	21
3	Elgin City	12	7	2	3	44	19	+25	16

Source: RSSSF

Other Senior Leagues

Division	Winner
Ayrshire League	Annbank
Midland League	King's Park
Northern League	Arbroath
Scottish Alliance	Cowlairs
Scottish Federation	Royal Albert
South of Scotland League	unfinished

== Scotland national team ==
Date	Venue	Opponents	Score (Note: Scotland's score is shown first.)	Competition	Scotland scorer(s)
18 March	The Racecourse, Wrexham (A)	Wales	6–0	BHC	Robert Smyth McColl (3), John W. Campbell (2), Harry Marshall
25 March	Celtic Park, Glasgow (H)	Ireland	9–1	BHC	Robert Smyth McColl (3), Robert Hamilton (2), John W. Campbell, Jack Bell, Alex Christie, Davidson Berry
8 April	Villa Park, Birmingham (A)	England	1–2	BHC	Robert Hamilton

Key:

- (H) = Home match
- (A) = Away match
- BHC = British Home Championship

Team	Pld	W	D	L	GF	GA	GD	Pts
England (C)	3	3	0	0	19	3	+16	6
Scotland	3	2	0	1	16	3	+13	4
Ireland	3	1	0	2	4	22	−18	2
Wales	3	0	0	3	0	11	−11	0

Rules for classification: 1) points. The points system worked as follows: 2 points for a win and 1 point for a draw.
(C) Champions

== Other national teams ==
=== Scottish League XI ===
Date	Venue	Opponents	Score (Note: Scottish League XI's score is shown first.)	Scotland scorer(s)
11 February	Solitude, Belfast (A)	(Northern Ireland) Irish League XI	1–3	William Michael
1 April	Celtic Park, Glasgow (H)	(England) Football League XI	1–4	John Campbell

== See also ==
- 1898–99 Rangers F.C. season
