= 1894–95 in Scottish football =

Football in Scotland
- Season: 1894–95

1894–95 in Scottish football

Division One champions
- Heart of Midlothian

Division Two champions
- Hibernian

Scottish Cup winners
- St Bernard's

Junior Cup winners
- Ashfield

Scotland national team
- 1895 BHC

The 1894–95 season in Scottish football was the 22nd season of competitive football in Scotland and the fifth season of the Scottish Football League.

== League competitions ==
=== Scottish Division One ===
Hearts won the Scottish Division One.

Pos	Team	Pld	W	D	L	GF	GA	GD	Pts	Qualification or relegation
1	Heart of Midlothian (C)	18	15	1	2	50	18	+32	31	Champions
2	Celtic	18	11	4	3	50	29	+21	26	
3	Rangers	18	10	2	6	41	26	+15	22	
4	Third Lanark	18	10	1	7	51	39	+12	21	
5	St Mirren	18	9	1	8	34	34	0	19	
6	St Bernard's	18	8	1	9	37	40	−3	17	
7	Clyde	18	8	0	10	38	47	−9	16	
8	Dundee	18	6	2	10	28	33	−5	14	
9	Dumbarton	18	3	1	14	27	58	−31	7	
10	Leith Athletic (R)	18	3	1	14	32	64	−32	7	Relegated to the 1895–96 Scottish Division Two

Source: "1894-1895 Division 1 - SPFL Archive". SPFL.
Rules for classification: Teams finish equal if level on points. Points system: 2 points for a win, 1 point for a draw, 0 points for a loss
(C) Champions; (R) Relegated

=== Scottish Division Two ===
Hibernian topped the Scottish Division Two for the second successive year. Renton failed to show for their fixture at Dundee Wanderers, hence only 17 games played for both clubs. Dundee Wanderers were awarded the two points for the game.

Pos	Team	Pld	W	D	L	GF	GA	GD	Pts	Promotion or relegation
1	Hibernian (C, P)	18	14	2	2	92	28	+64	30	Promoted to the 1895–96 Scottish First Division
2	Motherwell	18	10	2	6	56	39	+17	22	
3	Port Glasgow Athletic	18	8	4	6	62	56	+6	20	
3	Renton	17	10	0	7	46	44	+2	20	
5	Morton	18	9	1	8	59	63	−4	19	
6	Abercorn	18	7	4	7	51	65	−14	18	
6	Airdrieonians	18	8	2	8	68	45	+23	18	
8	Partick Thistle	18	7	3	8	50	62	−12	17	
9	Dundee Wanderers (R)	17	3	1	13	44	86	−42	9 (Note: Renton failed to turn up for a fixture against Dundee Wanderers. Two points were awarded to Dundee Wanderers.)	Resigned (Note: Both Dundee Wanderers and Cowlairs resigned from the league at the end of the season.)
10	Cowlairs (R)	18	2	3	13	37	77	−40	7	Resigned

Source: statto.com
Rules for classification: Teams finish equal if level on points. Points system: 2 points for a win, 1 point for a draw, 0 points for a loss
(C) Champions; (P) Promoted; (R) Relegated

== Other honours ==
=== Cup honours ===
==== National ====
Competition	Winner	Score	Runner-up
Scottish Cup	St Bernard's	2 – 1	Renton
Scottish Junior Cup	Ashfield	2 – 1	West Calder Wanderers

==== County ====
Competition	Winner	Score	Runner-up
Aberdeenshire Cup	Orion	5 – 0	Aberdeen
Ayrshire Cup	Annbank	4 – 2 (Note: Replay needed.)	Kilmarnock
Border Cup	Selkirk	5 – 0	Vale of Leithen
Dumbartonshire Cup	Dumbarton	2 – 1	Renton
East of Scotland Shield	Bo'ness	4 – 0	Adventurers
Fife Cup	Clackmannan	1 –0	Cowdenbeath
Forfarshire Cup	Dundee	1 – 0	Lochee United
Glasgow Cup	Celtic	2 – 0	Rangers
Lanarkshire Cup	Motherwell	7 – 3	Albion Rovers
Linlithgowshire Cup	Bathgate	5 – 4	Bo'ness
North of Scotland Cup	Clachnacuddin	6 – 3	Inverness Citadel
Perthshire Cup	St Johnstone	6 – 3	Dunblane
Renfrewshire Cup	Port Glasgow Ath	6 – 1	Arthurlie
Southern Counties Cup	Maxwelltown Thistle	3 – 2	5th KRV
Stirlingshire Cup	Falkirk	5 – 2	Stenhousemuir

=== Non-league honours ===
Highland League

Top Three
Pos	Team	Pld	W	D	L	GF	GA	GD	Pts
1	Clachnacuddin	10	8	2	0	44	20	+24	18
2	Inverness Thistle	10	5	4	1	31	25	+6	14
3	Inverness Caledonian	9	4	4	1	23	16	+7	12

Source: RSSSF

Other Senior Leagues

Division	Winner
Ayrshire Combination	Ayr
Ayrshire League	Dalry
Midland League	Falkirk
Scottish Alliance	Wishaw Thistle

== Scotland national team ==
Date	Venue	Opponents	Score (Note: Scotland's score is shown first.)	Competition	Scotland scorer(s)
23 March 1895	Racecourse Ground, Wrexham (A)	Wales	2–2	BHC	John Madden, John Divers
30 March 1895	Celtic Park, Glasgow (H)	Ireland	3–1	BHC	John Walker (2), William Lambie
6 April 1895	Goodison Park, Liverpool (A)	England	0–3	BHC	

Key:

- (H) = Home match
- (A) = Away match
- BHC = British Home Championship

Team	Pld	W	D	L	GF	GA	GD	Pts
England (C)	3	2	1	0	13	1	+12	5
Wales	3	0	3	0	5	5	0	3
Scotland	3	1	1	1	5	6	−1	3
Ireland	3	0	1	2	3	14	−11	1

Rules for classification: 1) points. The points system worked as follows: 2 points for a win and 1 point for a draw.
(C) Champions

== Other national teams ==
=== Scottish League XI ===
Date	Venue	Opponents	Score (Note: Scottish League XI's score is shown first.)	Scotland scorer(s)
2 February	Grosvenor Park, Belfast (A)	(Northern Ireland) Irish League XI	4–1	John Taylor (2), John Connolly, Laurie Bell
13 April	Celtic Park, Glasgow (H)	(England) Football League XI	1–4	John Madden

== See also ==
- 1894–95 Rangers F.C. season
