= Strathmore F.C. =

Strathmore F.C. or Strathmore Football Club may refer to:

- Strathmore F.C. (Arbroath), a defunct Scottish association football club from Arbroath, Angus
- Strathmore F.C. (Dundee), a defunct Scottish association football club from Dundee, Angus
- Strathmore Football Club, an Australian rules football club from Strathmore, Victoria, Australia
