= Strathmore F.C. (Dundee) =

Former association football club in Scotland

Strathmore
- Full name: Strathmore Football Club
- Nicknames: the Strathie, the Stripes
- Founded: 1876
- Dissolved: 1894
- Ground: Rollo's Pier
to 1881 colours	1884–92 colours

Strathmore Football Club was a Scottish association football club based in the city of Dundee. The club was founded in 1876 and dissolved in 1894. It reached the final of the Forfarshire Cup in 1886–87 and 1887–88.

== History ==
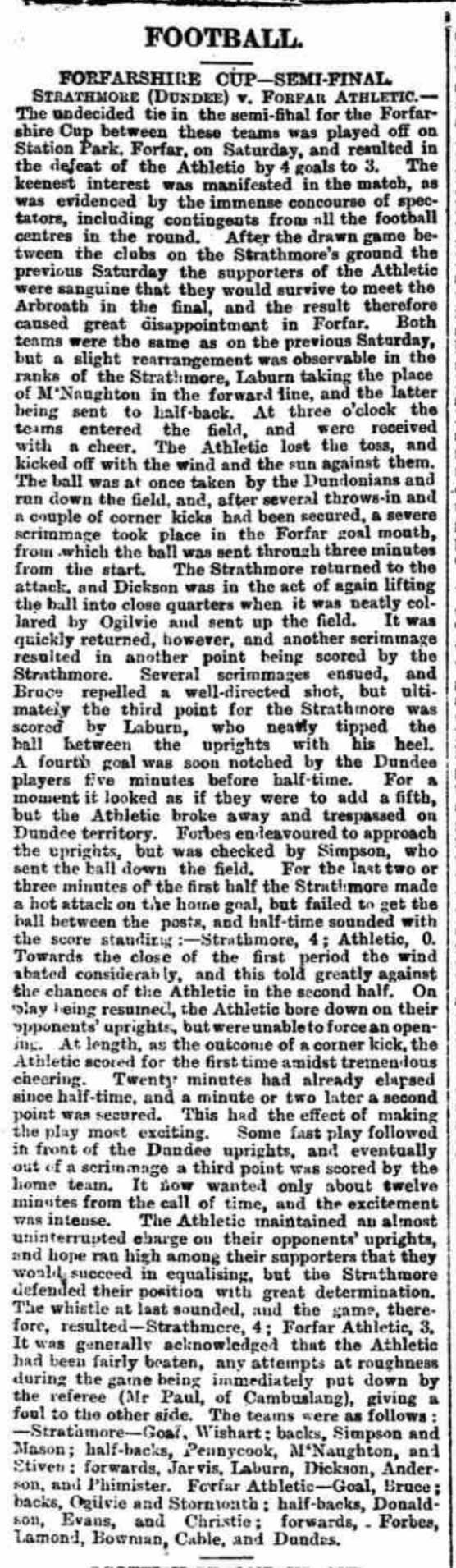
1887–88 Forfarshire Cup Semi-final, Forfar Athletic 3–4 Strathmore (Dundee), Dundee Courier, 31 October 1887

The club was founded in 1876, although it later claimed an earlier foundation date, and the earliest recorded match for the club is a 5–0 defeat to Dunmore on Magdalen Green in March 1877. The club took its name from its patron, the Earl of Strathmore.

Into the early 1880s, there were few clubs in Dundee, and in 1880–81 the Strathie only played 6 matches, winning 2 and losing 4. By 1883 however there had been something of an explosion, with clubs such as Balgay, East End, Perseverance, and West End having started up, and the Strathie, as one of the oldest and best established, was also one of the largest.

=== Scottish Cup record ===
It was not however quite of the first tier locally. In the regionalized Scottish Cup, the club could never get past the third round, three times falling to the biggest Dundee club, Our Boys, at that stage; the closest the club came to the fourth round was in 1883–84, twice taking the lead in front of a 2,000 crowd at Rollo's Pier thanks to a Taylor screw-shot from the by-line and Petrie finishing off a cross; Our Boys made the score 2–2 thanks to a freak goal as goalkeeper Jarvis accidentally carried the ball over the goal-line. In the replay at West Craigie, the Strathie took the lead through a Wilkie shot, before losing 5–1 - the cause not helped by an injury to full-back Christie taking him out of the game.

=== Forfarshire Cup ===
It faced similar difficulties in the leading local tournament, the Forfarshire Cup, almost always coming up short against the very top local sides; in 1887–88, the club reached the final after some considerable luck with the draw, but lost 10–2 to Arbroath at East Dock Street, in front of a crowd of 10,000. Its best season had come the season before, in 1886–87, when it surprised Arbroath with a 4–2 first round win, and beat Arbroathian namesakes Strathmore (Arbroath) in the second - the Dundee side winning 5–4, after losing a three-goal lead, and ending the game having to shelter the referee from angry home fans. In the final the club lost 4–2 to the reigning champions Harp of Dundee.

=== Burns Charity Cup ===
The club was similarly ill-starred in the local charity cups. Twice it reached the final of the Dundee Burns Club Charity Cup, in 1885–86 and 1889–90, but lost heavily both times - 5–1 to Harp in the first and 9–1 to East End in the second, spectators being said to have lost count in the latter final, but there was considerable mitigation for the Strathie, as it played much of the match with 10 men, inside-left Anderson retiring injured when the score was 2–0. The one consolation to the club in the 1890–91 tournament was beating Our Boys for the only time in a competitive match in the semi-final, 3–0 at East Dock Street.

=== Trying to join the Northern League ===
The club's status was demonstrated by it not being accepted as a member of the new Northern League on its foundation in 1891–92, with only three clubs from Dundee being allowed in, and the voting being in favour of East End, Our Boys, and Harp; the Strathie was not even on the initial short-list of 12. The club applied to join in 1892–93, but only obtained 2 votes, five short of what was required; another Dundee also-ran club, Johnstone Wanderers, was elected.

Strathie tried again in 1893–94, by which time Our Boys and East End had merged to play in the Scottish League as Dundee. Although the club lost in the vote to Victoria United, Aberdeen, and the re-elected St Johnstone, the club had a second chance as the cash-strapped Harp - faced with "rampant" professionalism and having to pay as much as £3 to secure players - withdrew in protest at the abandoning of minimum admission prices, which left a vacancy.

=== Merger with Johnstone Wanderers ===
After six matches in the 1893–94 season, both Johnstone Wanderers and Strathmore announced their resignations from the Northern League, on the basis that the gate money for matches at Montrose and Victoria United of Aberdeen was not worth the candle; the Strathie was facing eviction as the Dundee F.C. committee had bought out its ground, and had been looking to share Clepington Park which led to an assumption that the Wanderers and Strathmore were effectively acting as one club.

That suspicion was confirmed in January 1894 when a new club, Dundonians, was formed by merger between the Wanderers and Strathmore, and played its first match under that name against Hibernian that month. As the media often referred to the Dundee club as "the Dundonians", Dundee made a formal objection, and the new club instead used the Wanderers name, usually referred to as Dundee Wanderers.

== Colours ==
The club wore the following:

- 1880–81: scarlet and blue 1" hoops
- 1881–82: scarlet and navy blue 1½" hoops
- 1882–84: light blue jerseys and hose, and white knickers
- 1884–92: 1" black and white hooped jerseys and hose, and navy knickers
- 1892–94: royal blue shirts, dark blue knickers

== Ground ==
In common with many other clubs from the city, Strathmore originally played on the public area at Magdalen Green. In 1882 the club moved to Rollo's Pier. The club spent the 189192 and 1892–93 seasons at Logie Park, only securing the ground one week before the club's 1891–92 Scottish Cup tie with Kirriemuir, and in 1893 beat the new Dundee F.C. to the punch by securing Carolina Port.
