= Dundee Our Boys F.C. =

Former association football club in Scotland

Dundee Our Boys
- Full name: Dundee Our Boys Football Club
- Nickname: Light Blues
- Founded: 1877
- Dissolved: 1893
- Ground: Baxter Park, Dundee; West Craigie Park, Dundee
1877–83 colours	1887–93 colours

Dundee Our Boys Football Club were a football club from Dundee, Scotland.

== History ==
Founded in 1877, the club officially recorded its name as Our Boys (Dundee). Our Boys' first appearance in the Scottish Cup came in the 1878–79 season, losing 3–0 away to Arbroath in the first round. Some records state that their first Scottish Cup appearance was against South Western the previous season, but this Our Boys club was actually a Glasgow side of the same name. The next two seasons would also see first round exits; 5–1 again, against Arbroath in 1879–80 and 2–1 against Rob Roy of Callander in 1880–81.

In 1881–82 Our Boys reached the fourth round of the cup, defeating Arbroath 2–1 in the first round, Dundee Harp 5–3 in the second round and Strathmore (of Dundee) 4–1 in the third round. Our Boys were eventually defeated 9–2 by Kilmarnock away from home in the fourth round. The 1882–83 season saw further success when Our Boys defeated Dundee Hibernian 2–1 in the first round, Balgay 5–3 in the second round before being defeated 6–4 by Vale of Teith in the third round.

In 1883–84 they drew a local rival in the first round, this time winning 3–2 at home to Dundee West End. A second round 2–0 home win over Strathmore (of Arbroath) saw them face Strathmore (of Dundee) in the third round. A 2–2 away draw was followed by a 5–1 home win to secure their place in the fourth round for the second time. However, they lost 11–0 away to Pollokshields Athletic in the fourth round.

Strathmore (of Arbroath) were again their opponents in the first round of the 1884–85 tournament, with Our Boys winning 4–1 away from home. They thrashed Dundee West End 8–1 in the second round and Strathmore (of Dundee) 5–1 in the third, leading to a fourth round tie at home to West Benhar. They drew the first game 2–2, but then lost the replay 8–3. In 1885, an offshoot of Our Boys left to form Dundee Wanderers.

The 1885–86 tournament began with an 8–2 away win against Coupar Angus in the first round. However, Our Boys lost 4–1 away to Dundee Harp in the second round to end their participation for that year. The following season was even more disappointing, a 5–2 defeat at home to Forfar Athletic in the first round.

The first round of the 1887–88 tournament saw them win 9–4 away to a club named Aberdeen. They followed this with a 5–3 win at home to Montrose and a 5–0 win away to Fair City Athletic in the third round. They received a bye in the fourth round and won 4–2 at home to Albion Rovers in the fifth to give them a place in the quarter-finals, where they lost 6–0 to a Cambuslang side that would go on to reach the final.

The following season saw a 5–4 win at home to local rivals Dundee East End in the first round, a 4–2 home win against Lochee United in the second and a 2–1 win at home to Dundee Harp in the third before an 11–1 defeat away to Abercorn in the fourth round. The 1889–90 tournament began for Our Boys with a 6–3 win at home to Strathmore. A 6–5 win away to Dundee Harp followed in the second round, before losing 3–2 at home to another Dundee side, East End, in the third round. However, the club did win the Forfarshire Cup that season, retaining the following season.

With the advent of the Scottish Football League in 1890, the 1890–91 Cup included league and non-league sides for the first time. Our Boys beat fellow non-league side Forfar Athletic in the first round and received a bye in the second, before beating Dundee East End 4–0 in the third round. The fourth round saw their first and only encounter with a league side in a competitive game, losing 3–1 at home to Celtic. The match drew Dundee Our Boy's record crowd of 6,000.

The club joined the Northern League in 1891 and shared the first league title with city rivals East End. In the 1891–92 Cup they lost 2–0 in the first preliminary round to Dundee Harp after a 4–4 draw. The 1892–93 campaign saw a first preliminary round victory over Lochee United, a second preliminary round bye and a third preliminary round defeat to Dunblane after a replay.

=== Merger with East End ===
In June 1893, a proposal was made for Our Boys to merge with East End, with six members from each club to form a committee to create a new club. The committee met for the first time on 23 June 1893, at Mathers' Hotel in Dundee, with J. Petrie of East End being appointed chairman. The final match for the two clubs was against each other, six days later; a benefit match for the widow and family of a deceased member of both clubs, played at the Dundee Harp ground. The new club was called Dundee F.C. and it joined the Scottish League shortly afterwards.

== Colours ==
The club originally played in red and black stripes with white shorts, changing the shirts to dark blue in 1882, the shorts to dark blue in 1886, and the shirts to a lighter blue from 1887.

== Grounds ==
Our Boys played at West Craigie Park from 1882 to the time of the merger with East End in 1893. The new Dundee side initially played at West Craigie Park, before moving East End's former ground, Carolina Port, midway through the 1893–94 season.

== Honours ==
- Northern League: 1891–92
- Forfarshire Cup: 1889–90, 1890–91
- Burns Charity Cup: 1890–91

== See also ==
Category:Dundee Our Boys F.C. players
