= Bon Accord F.C. =

Former Scottish football club

Bon Accord
- Full name: Bon Accord Football Club
- Nickname: the Bons
- Founded: 1884
- Dissolved: 1892
- Ground: Recreation Grounds
- Secretary: William M'Lean, Arthur Jaffray
Home colours

Bon Accord Football Club was a football team from Aberdeen, Scotland who suffered the worst defeat in any Scottish senior football match, losing 36–0 to Arbroath on 12 September 1885 in a first round match of the 1885–86 Scottish Cup. Thirteen goals were scored by centre-forward John Petrie, a Scottish Cup and joint world record.

This record stood until 2023, when St Machar Thistle were defeated 51–0 by AC Mill Inn Academy in the Scottish Amateur Cup. It remains a record for a competitive first-class fixture.

== History ==
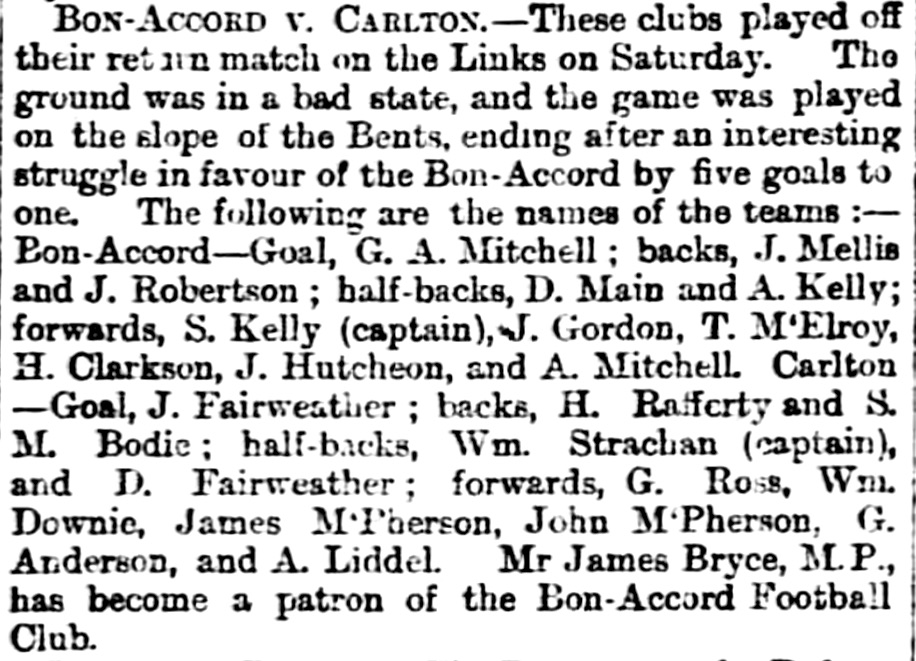
Going nap against Carlton, Aberdeen Evening Express, 25 January 1886. There is no presently available record of the Bons' side for the Cup tie, but this line-up may have included some of the players - Mellis, A. Kelly, Main, A. Mitchell, Jones, and Gordon all featured for a combined Bons-Rovers side a month after the tie.

The club was founded in 1884. Bon Accord (French "good agreement") is a motto of Aberdeen, also used metonymically for the city itself.

Contrary to urban myth, the club did have experience before the 1885–86 Scottish Cup tie against Arbroath; its first match was a 5–3 win against Aberdeen Rovers, and it had had two matches in the 1884–85 season before the Cup tie, losing to the original Aberdeen club and beating Rovers.

=== Game v Arbroath in the Scottish Cup ===
Bon Accord was drawn at home, but conceded the right to host the game to Arbroath. Arbroath were 15–0 up by half time, and scored another 21 goals past stand-in goalkeeper Andrew Lornie in the second half. The Scottish Athletic Journal at the time wrote "The leather was landed between the posts 41 times, but five of the times were disallowed. Here and there, enthusiasts would be seen scoring sheet and pencil in hand, taking note of the goals as one would score runs at a cricket match."

=== Later history ===
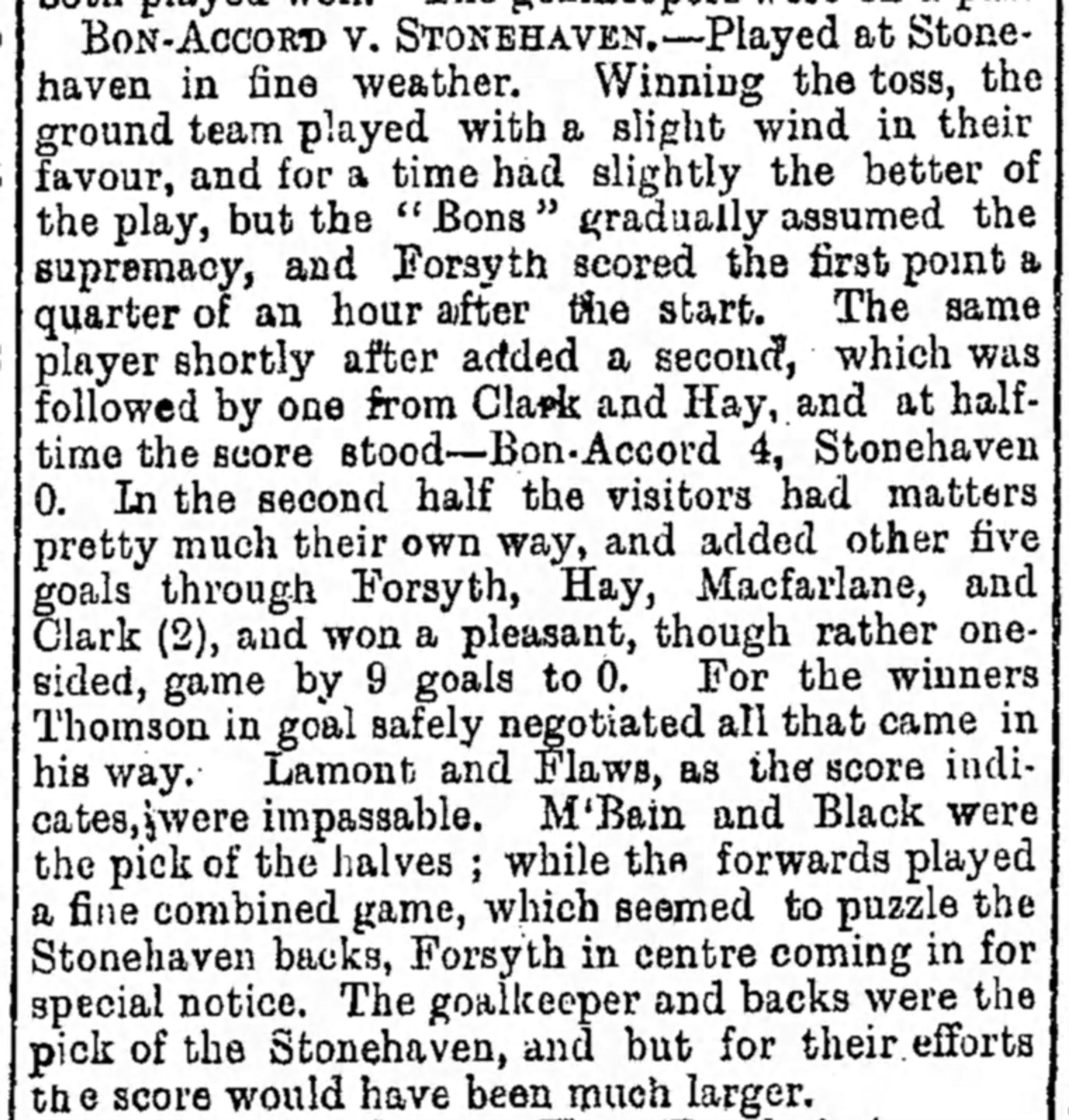
Happier times for the Bons, beating Stonehaven 9–0 in the first qualifying round of the Scottish Cup in 1891–92

Although the club continued to play into 1886, the club appears to have wound up in February 1886, only to be re-founded in March by the Good Templars Male Festival Choir; the "new" members however included previous players, such as captain G. A. Mitchell, and Robertson took on the role of treasurer.

Bon Accord was a founder member of the Aberdeenshire and District Football Association. The club played in the Aberdeenshire Cup from 1889 to 1892, its best performance being winning through two rounds (including a 10–0 away win at Aberdeen Harp) before losing to the original Aberdeen.

The club entered the Scottish Cup in 1891–92, by which time the Scottish Football Association had brought in preliminary rounds. In the 1st preliminary round (5 September 1891), Bon Accord won 9–0 at Stonehaven, with goals from Forsyth (3), Hay (2), Clark (3), and Macfarlane, but it lost 5–2 at home to the original Aberdeen in the 2nd round (26 September 1891), a tie notable for having the first penalty-kick in Aberdeenshire football, scored for Aberdeen by Key past Thomson. The penalty had been awarded for handball by captain Henry Flaws, who had a reputation for using his hands to prevent attacks, given the preceding lack of effective punishment.

The club's final match was in aid of the Scottish Junior Football Association, against a team of select junior players; the club's dissolution may have been down to a 4–1 victory over Victoria United, as in the aftermath seven of its players were recruited by Aberdeen, and another three emigrated. A Junior side – founded as Junior Bon Accord in 1890 – soon adopted the name.

== Colours ==
The club's original colours were black and white striped shirts (in the context of the time, this refers to hoops) and white knickers. There is a reference to players wearing plain white shirts for the tie with Arbroath, taken from their cricket whites, but this is probably apocryphal and based on the erroneous belief that Bon Accord was a renamed Orion Cricket Club.

From 1890 to 1892 the club wore dark blue.

== Ground ==
The club's home was the Recreation Grounds in Aberdeen. In 1891 the Bons replaced Caledonian F.C. (Aberdeen) at the Holburn Grounds.
