= Caledonian F.C. (Aberdeen) =

Former association football club in Scotland

Caledonian
- Full name: Caledonian F.C.
- Nicknames: the Caley, the Stripes
- Founded: 1886
- Dissolved: 1891
- Ground: Holburn Grounds
- Match Secretary: Alex. Love, Joseph Ross
- Captain: Joseph Ross
Home colours

Caledonian F.C. was an association football club from Aberdeen, Scotland, which played in the Scottish Cup, and reached the Aberdeenshire Cup final, in 1890–91.

== History ==
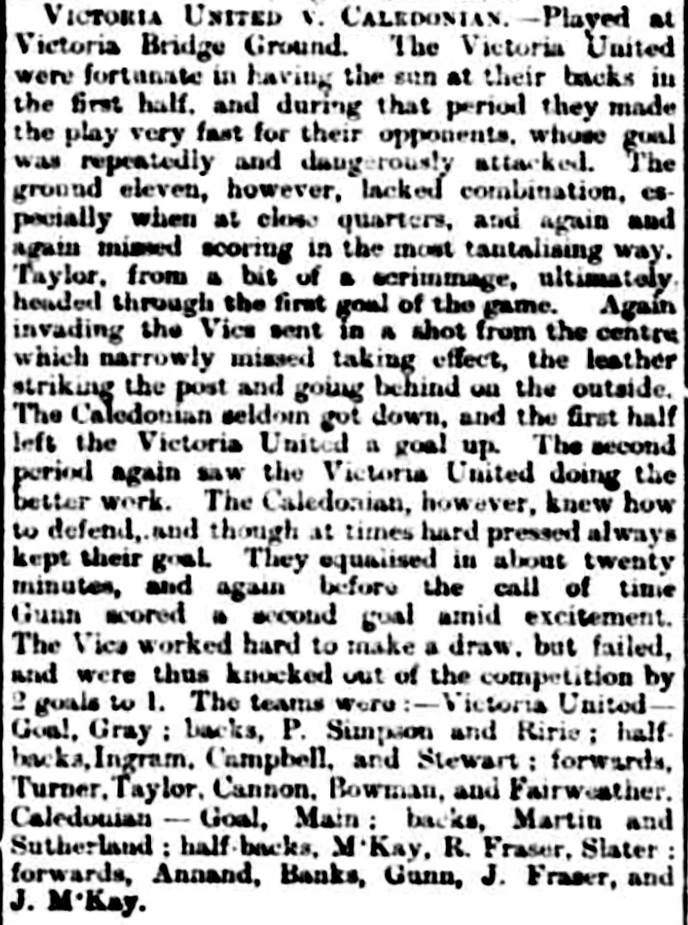
1890–91 Scottish Cup 1st Round, Victoria United 1–2 Caledonian (Aberdeen), Aberdeen Journal, 8 September 1890

The Caledonian football club was formed by the Caledonian Cricket Club, at a meeting in The Café in Aberdeen on 3 September 1886, Joseph Ross being chosen as first football captain. The club did not finish the cricket season until October, so its first association match did not take place until 23 October 1886, a 3–2 defeat to an Aberdeen scratch side.

Caledonian was one of the founder members of the Aberdeenshire Football Association in August 1887. The organization set up the Aberdeenshire Cup to be played from that season, which allowed the Caledonian its first taste of competitive football, although it lost its first ties in its first three entries. The 1889–90 tie with Orion - the fourth round of the competition, thanks to a run of byes - originally ended a remarkable 8–6 to Orion, but a Caledonian protest on the basis that the game finished in the dark was upheld. The protest was to no avail as Orion won the replay 8–4.

Caledonian joined the Scottish Football Association in August 1890. It made its national debut at Victoria United in the 1890–91 Scottish Cup and withstood a siege in the first half, to turn around only 1–0 down; the siege continued in the second half, but Caledonian unexpectedly scored two breakaway goals to pull off a shock. There was no shock in the second round, as Aberdeen put 8 past Caledonian without reply.

Caledonian enjoyed a belated, if controversial, revenge in the Aberdeenshire Cup. Held to a draw by Inverurie at its "rough ground", Caledonian brushed the country club aside in the replay with an 8–0 win. Caledonian drew Aberdeen at home in the quarter-final, and, in front of a big crowd, Aberdeen won 6–4. However the Caley had complained about two of the goals being offside, as well as having a goal from a free-kick disallowed, and made a formal protest to the Aberdeenshire association; notably, the referee, Mr Curran, was a late replacement for the engaged official, and he had some recent history with the Caledonian, which had protested about his expenses claims for the Inverurie tie. The Aberdeenshire FA upheld the protest, and ordered a replay of the tie on Boxing Day. The Caley turned up, but Aberdeen had already resolved not to turn up on the basis that the protest was not merely improper, but was not heard under the Association rules; and the Caley was awarded the tie. Despite there being no opposition, one of the Caledonian players was ordered off the field, having turned up wearing his "tacketed" (i.e. nailed) work boots, assuming there would be no game; referee Harper, noting that the footwear was illegal, told him to change. In the aftermath, Aberdeen withdrew from the Aberdeen Association, but there was enough bonhomie between the two clubs for a friendly to take place in February, Aberdeen winning thanks to a late goal.

Caledonian hammered Stonehaven 11–0 in the semi-final, Stonehaven's desperate protest about frost on the Holburn ground not being entertained. In the final against Orion at Victoria Bridge, Annand gave Caledonian the lead after 8 minutes, but by half-time Orion was 2–1 to the good, and "one of the dullest - and, at times, even depressing - exhibitions of football" ended 4–1 to the favourites. The match was overshadowed by Aberdeen arranging a home friendly with Arbroath as a direct snub to the local association, and which drew a 25% bigger gate.

Despite what appeared to be a promising start to a senior football career, the Caledonian did not survive to the 1891–92 season, scratching to Aberdeen in the Scottish Cup that season and not entering the Aberdeen Cup; players had already decamped elsewhere for the season, such as Annand and Fraser joining Orion and Forsyth joining Bon Accord. The club's final appearances had been a 3–1 defeat to Victoria United in the first round of the Charity Cup and an 8–0 defeat to Orion in a friendly. The club was formally removed from the register in August 1892.

== Colours ==
The club wore vertical blue and black striped shirts.

== Ground ==
The club played at the Holburn Grounds, which were owned by the Aberdeenshire Cricket Club, although at times the relationship between the A.C.C. and football was somewhat testy. For 1891–92 the ground was taken over by Bon Accord.
