= Arbroath F.C. 36–0 Bon Accord F.C. =

1885 football match

- Event: 1885–86 Scottish Cup
Arbroath	Bon Accord
36	0
- Date: 12 September 1885
- Venue: Gayfield Park
- Referee: Dave Stormont

Arbroath F.C. 36–0 Bon Accord F.C. is the result of a football match between Arbroath and Bon Accord which took place on 12 September 1885.

It holds the largest margin of victory in an unrigged first-class football match. A match between AS Adema and SO l'Emyrne, a thrown game where SO l'Emyrne scored 149 deliberate own goals in a protest against prior officiating decisions, took the title of most goals in a professional football match in 2002.

== Background ==
Arbroath were drawn against Bon Accord in the first round of the Scottish Cup which was played on 12 September 1885. The lot gave Bon Accord home advantage, but the club decided to switch the tie to Gayfield.

Although Arbroath was only founded seven years earlier in 1878, they were already vastly more experienced than Bon Accord which was only a year old. Some sources state that Bon Accord were really Orion Cricket Club, who had received the entry confirmation from the Scottish FA instead of Orion FC. However, in reality Bon Accord had been formed in 1884 as a bona fide football club, while Orion F.C. was not formed until October 1885, well after the opening rounds of the Scottish Cup had been played. The Bons' first recorded match had taken place in February 1885, and was a 5–3 win over Aberdeen Rovers, also taking part in its first match, at the Aberdeen Recreation Grounds.

Bon Accord opened the 1885–86 season season on 29 August 1885, with a 4–0 defeat at the original Aberdeen club; on 5 September the Bons fought to a 1–0 win over Aberdeen Rovers at the Recreation Grounds. Arbroath meanwhile had a tougher warm-up match, at home to Clyde on 5 September, which ended 3–2 to the visitors, Arbroath's task made harder by some of the Red Lichties playing for the Forfarshire FA select on the same day.

== A record-breaking game ==
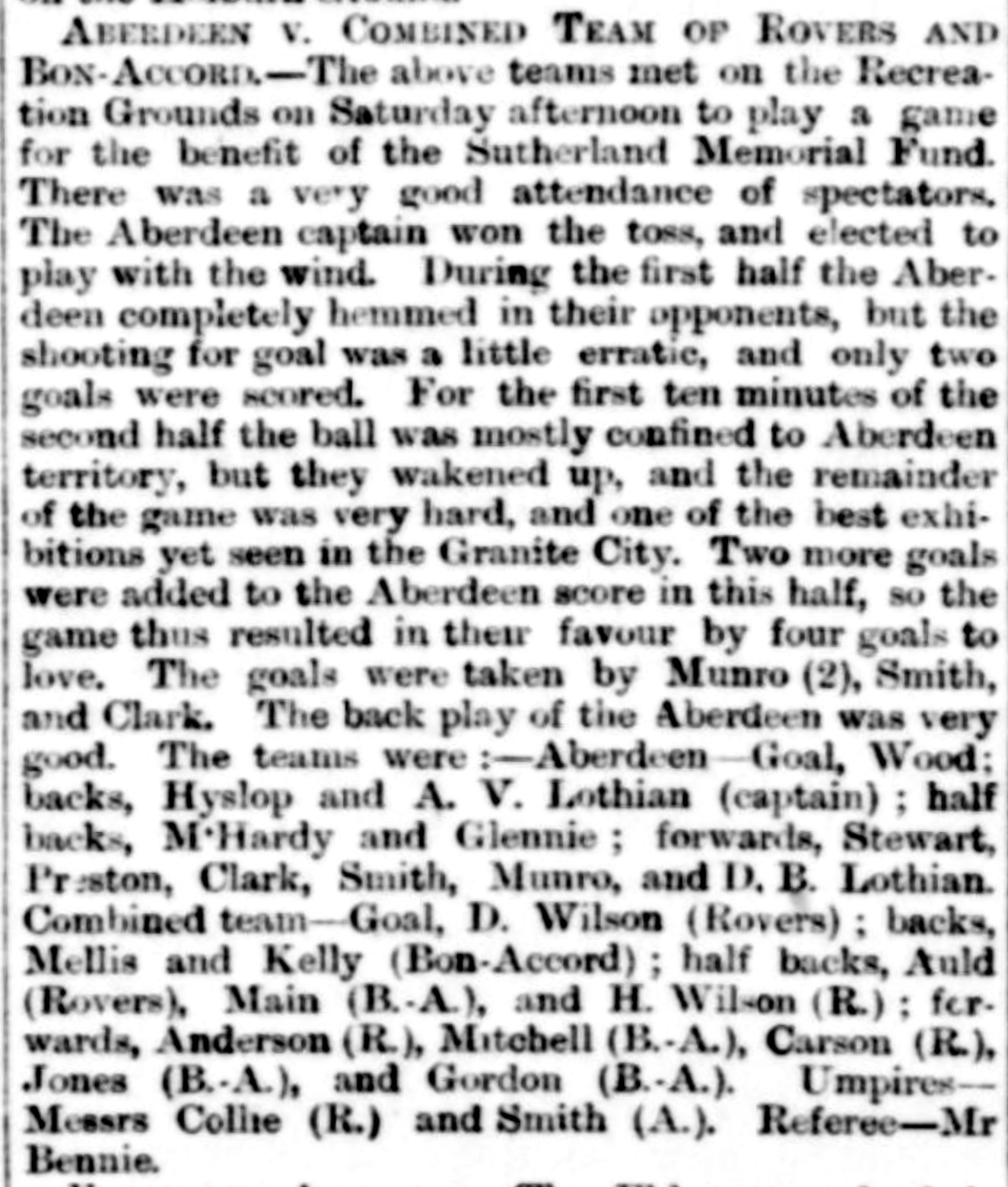
Although no full record of the Bons' line-up for the match has yet emerged, a number of its players teamed with fellow Cup sufferers Aberdeen Rovers the following month, for a charity match against the original Aberdeen club. (Aberdeen Press & Journal, 26 October 1885)

Bon Accord's designated goalkeeper, Jimmie Grant, had declared himself injured the day before the game, so right-half Andrew Lornie took over between the sticks. With the teams being so mismatched, it was likely that Arbroath would win easily, but even in a period where high scoring games were common, this result was unprecedented.

Arbroath was 15–0 up by half time, and scored another 21 goals in the second half. The Scottish Athletic Journal wrote, "The leather was landed between the posts 41 times, but five of the times were disallowed. Here and there, enthusiasts would be seen scoring sheet and pencil in hand, taking note of the goals as one would score runs at a cricket match." Lornie reportedly suffered a serious arm injury during the game but carried on in goal.

Referee Dave Stormont later claimed that had he taken a harder line with the Aberdeen team, Arbroath could have won 43–0. Stormont said, "My only regret was that I chalked off seven goals, for while they may have looked doubtful from an offside point of view, so quickly did the Maroons carry the ball from midfield, and so close and rapid was their passing, that it was very doubtful whether they could be offside." Other reports claim only four goals were chalked off. One contemporary report stated that Arbroath goalkeeper Jim Milne Sr did not touch the ball in the entire game and spent the whole of the match sheltering from the rain under a spectator's umbrella.

The 18-year-old John Petrie scored 13 goals, still the record for most goals scored in a senior tournament, although it was equalled by Archie Thompson when Australia beat American Samoa 31–0 on 11 April 2001 in a qualifier for the 2002 World Cup.

== Concurrent Dundee Harp match ==
On the same day, 18 miles (29 kilometres) away in Dundee, Dundee Harp were also playing in the first round of the Scottish Cup against Aberdeen Rovers. Dundee Harp beat Aberdeen Rovers 35–0. The referee is said to have noted 37 goals, but Harp's secretary suggested a miscount must have occurred as he had recorded only 35. The match official, acknowledging it was difficult for him to keep accurate details during such a deluge of goals, accepted the lower tally and wired the official score of 35–0 to the Scottish Football Association headquarters. However, unlike in the Arbroath-Bon Accord match, contemporary reports do not refer to any disallowed goals.

== Aftermath ==
In the following rounds of the Scottish Cup, Arbroath beat local rivals Forfar Athletic 9–1 in the second round and Dundee East End 7–1 in the third round before losing 5–3 to Hibernian in the fourth round, scoring a total of 55 goals in that season's Scottish Cup. Bon Accord did win a Cup tie in 1891–92, beating Stonehaven 8–0 away in the first preliminary round, but wound up at the end of the season.

Jim Lornie, grandson of the hapless Bons goalkeeper Andrew, played in goal for Arbroath in 1952, before joining St Mirren.

To celebrate the historic achievement of the scoreline, Angus MSP Andrew Welsh tabled a motion in the Scottish Parliament in 2000.

In December 2000, Romanian side Carpați Mârșa beat Avântul Dârlos 41–0, but the result was not ratified as it was not in a professional competition, so Arbroath maintained their record. (Note: This is despite the fact that Arbroath's win was also not in a professional competition, as professionalism was not permitted in Scottish football until 1893.) A similar situation arose in May 2016, when Pelileo SC beat Indi Native 44–1 in an Ecuadorian third division match.

On 31 October 2002, Malagasy side AS Adema beat SO l'Emyrne 149–0 in the national championship; while this has been claimed as the record for highest victory margin in a senior football competition, SOE intentionally scored own goals throughout the match as a protest to a refereeing decision in their previous match, meaning Arbroath still holds the record margin of victory for a contested match in senior football.

In March 2012, amateur side Wheel Power FC won 58–0 against Nova 2010 FC, eclipsing the Illogan Reserves' 55–0 victory against Madron FC in the Cornish Mining League in November 2010 to become the biggest win in British football history.

On 2 August 2020, TPS II Winogrady beat Big Show FC 46–0 in a Polish Cup regional tie in Poznań.

== Match details ==
12 September 1885

Arbroath	36–0	Bon Accord
Petrie (x13); Munro (x7); Robertson (x6); Crawford (x6); Marshall (x2); Tackett (x2)

Arbroath
Referee: Dave Stormont (Keith)

Arbroath	Bon Accord

GK	Jim Milne Sr.
DF	Bill Collie
DF	Tom Salmond
MF	Hen Rennie
MF	Jim Milne Jr.
FW	John Robertson
FW	John Petrie
FW	Johnny Tackett
FW	Jim Marshall
FW	David Crawford
FW	"Munro" (Jim Buick)
Match secretary: D. A. Duncan

GK	Andrew Lornie
DF
DF
DF
DF
MF
MF
MF
MF
MF
FW
Secretary:	William M'Lean
