= Aberdeen Rovers F.C. =

Former association football club in Scotland

Aberdeen Rovers
- Full name: Aberdeen Rovers Football Club
- Nickname: the Cleeks
- Founded: 1884
- Dissolved: 1890
- Ground: Recreation Grounds
Home colours

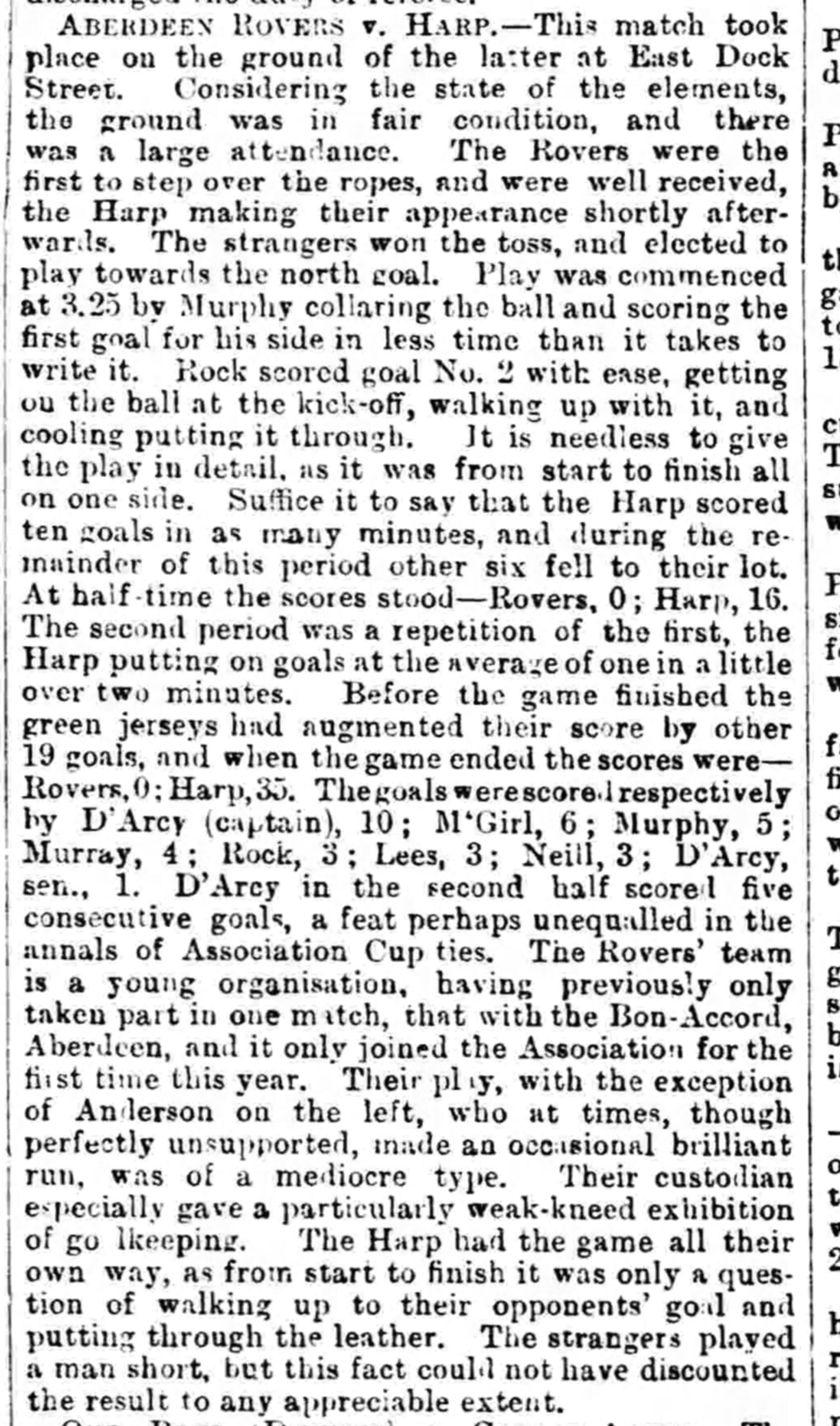
Match report for Dundee Harp 35–0 Aberdeen Rovers, The Courier and Argus, 15 September 1885

Aberdeen Rovers Football Club was a football team from Aberdeen, Scotland who suffered the second-worst defeat in any Scottish senior football match, losing 35–0 to Dundee Harp on 12 September 1885 in a first round match of the Scottish Cup. The match was the same day as the biggest-ever win, as Arbroath beat fellow Aberdonians Bon Accord 36–0.

== History ==
The club was formed in 1884, its earliest reported match being a 5–3 defeat at Bon Accord in February 1885. The Aberdeen media habitually referred to the club simply as Rovers.

=== Game v Dundee Harp in the Scottish Cup ===
The club had only played 5 matches before entering the Scottish Cup, and had lost them all; 4 in the first half of 1885, and one match at the start of the season, a one goal defeat to Bon Accord. The Cup tie was played at Harp's East Dock Street ground with admission costing 3d. Rovers were handicapped by only playing with ten men. Allegedly the referee in the Harp-Aberdeen Rovers game had noted 37 goals, but Harp's secretary suggested a miscount must have occurred as he had recorded only 35. The match official, acknowledging that it was difficult for him to keep accurate details during such a deluge of goals, accepted the lower tally and wired the official score of 35–0 to SFA headquarters. The contemporary reports however do not mention any disallowed goals, unlike for the Arbroath v Bon Accord match.

Dundee Harp full back Tom O'Kane was an ex-Arbroath player, and persuaded the Dundee club's officials to send a telegram to his former colleagues at Gayfield Park boasting of his team's record breaking achievement. The Harp players and officials were not to know that Arbroath had actually gone one better against another unfortunate Aberdeen side on that same afternoon. On receiving the Harp telegram, Arbroath officials took great delight in sending a reply boasting of the Angus side's superior achievement. It was only when O'Kane arrived back in Arbroath on the late Saturday evening train that he discovered the truth. Locals were quick to tell him that the Arbroath result was no joke and Harp's record-breaking claim was about to be lost.

=== Later history ===
The club entered the Scottish FA Cup twice more. In 1887–88, it received a bye to the second round, and was drawn to play Wanderers of Dundee (later Johnstone/Dundee Wanderers), with the choice of ground; the Rovers accepted an inducement from the Wanderers to switch the tie to Morgan Park. It may have been a mistake as Rovers lost 10–0, seven goals coming in the first half; the Rovers described as "a strong, heavy team" but lacking "combination" (teamwork). The next season, it was drawn away to Wanderers again, and decided to withdraw from the competition. The Rovers record of 0 goals for and 45 conceded in two ties, i.e. an average result of a 22.5 goals defeat per tie, means that the Rovers have the worst Scottish FA Cup record of any team.

The club was a founder member of the Aberdeenshire and District Football Association and played in the first Aberdeenshire Cup in 1887–88, reaching the semi-finals; the first round tie at Port Elphinstone saw the club's first and biggest competitive win, scoring six in the first half and winning 10–1. In 1888–89 it reached the third round, losing 4–0 to Orion.

Although the club was exempted to the third round for the following year's competition, and given a bye into the fourth, the club appears to have dissolved before being able to participate. At the start of the 1890–91 season, the club was struck off the Scottish Football Association membership list.

== Colours ==
The club originally played in blue shirts and white shorts, and wore white shirts from 1888.

== Ground ==
The club played at the Recreation Grounds, a mile from Aberdeen railway station - Aberdeen F.C. (1881) and Bon Accord also used the same grounds, but both had pitches nearer the station.
