= John Young (footballer, born 1951) =

Scottish footballer and manager

Personal information
- Date of birth: 22 October 1951 (age 75)
- Place of birth: Edinburgh, Scotland
- Position: Defender

Youth career
- Musselburgh Athletic

Senior career*
Years	Team	Apps	(Gls)
1970–1971	Hibernian	1	(0)
1971–1972	Broxburn Athletic		
1972–1974	Falkirk	45	(6)
1974–1982	St Mirren	214	(3)
1982	Hong Kong Rangers		
1982–1983	Queen of the South	3	(0)
1983–1985	Brechin City	65	(0)
1985–1987	Arbroath	45	(1)
Total		373	(10)

Managerial career
- 1987–1990: Arbroath
- 1994–2000: Brechin City
- * Club domestic league appearances and goals

John Young (born 22 October 1951) is a Scottish former association football player and manager now first team coach at East Fife.

Young was appointed assistant manager of Arbroath in March 2016.
