= Orion F.C. =

Former association football club in Scotland

Orion
- Full name: Orion Football Club
- Nickname: the Cocks o' the North
- Founded: 1885
- Dissolved: 1903
- Ground: Cattofield; Aberdeen
| Original colours | 1890s colours |

Orion Football Club was a Scottish football team that played in the city of Aberdeen between 1885 and 1903.

== History ==
The club came out of the Orion Cricket Club, and was founded at a club meeting on 3 October 1885, after the last cricket match of the season; J. D. Crow was named captain and James Dunn secretary and treasurer. The club's first known match was a 2–0 defeat to Bon Accord F.C., in which the Orion club was said to have been "very good for a new club".

The club made its Scottish Cup debut in 1886, and the luck of the first round draw sent the Orionians to the same Arbroath which had scored 36 against the Bons the previous season. Only 500 turned up to the match, following 5 hours of rain before kick-off, and although Orion kept the score down to 5 at half-time, the heaviness of the pitch and wind told against the Orion players' fitness, and Arbroath scored another 15 in the second half. The clubs met again in the first round in the 1887–88 Scottish Cup, Arbroath this time scoring 18 without reply, the Orion goalkeeper - praised for keeping the score down - declaring it a "grand exhibition game". Orion never beat a non-northern side in the Scottish Cup proper. Its best run came in 1899–1900, when it won through the Scottish Qualifying Cup and beat Forres Mechanics in the first round proper, going down to Kilmarnock in the second.

The club's first success came in the Aberdeenshire Cup in 1890–91; the original Aberdeen club had won the first three instalments, but, after a controversial quarter-final tie against Aberdeen Caledonian, the Caley ended up as Orion's final opponent. Orion came from behind to take an easy 4–1 win, although the attendance was affected by Aberdeen playing a "spoiler" friendly against Arbroath the same day.

Orion won two Northern League championships, in 1897 and 1899. The club also won the Rhodesia Cup in 1898–99 (contested with the other two senior Aberdeen clubs, Aberdeen and Victoria United).

At the end of the 1901–02 season, the local council wrote to the three main town clubs in relation to the unsafe conditions of their grounds. The financial difficulties led to Aberdeen looking to lease out the Pittodrie ground to Hibernian, which was facing eviction from Easter Road, and the shock of the proposal led to local discussions about forming a single Aberdeen club to join the Scottish Football League, led by Orion's George Alexander. Following discussions between the clubs and the Crescent Cricket Club (which owned Pittodrie), a deal was signed on 10 April 1903 to merge the three clubs under the Aberdeen name.

== Colours ==
The club's original colours Bismarck brown jerseys and hose; by 1889 it had adopted its normal colours of maroon and white vertical stripes. For its last season it wore white jerseys and knickers with navy hose.

== Grounds ==
The club's first match was at the Recreation Grounds in Aberdeen, moving to Cattofield by 1893.

== Scottish Cup Record ==
=== 1886–87 ===
| Round | Date | Opponent | H/A | Score | Orion Scorer(s) | Attendance |
|---|---|---|---|---|---|---|
| R1 | 11 September | Arbroath | A | 0–20 | | |

=== 1887–88 ===
| Round | Date | Opponent | H/A | Score | Orion Scorer(s) | Attendance |
|---|---|---|---|---|---|---|
| R1 | 6 September | Arbroath | A | 0–18 | | |

=== 1889–90 ===
| Round | Date | Opponent | H/A | Score | Orion Scorer(s) | Attendance |
|---|---|---|---|---|---|---|
| R1 | 7 September | Victoria United | H | 3–1 | | |
| R2 | 28 September | Aberdeen | A | 1–2 | | |

=== 1890–91 ===
| Round | Date | Opponent | H/A | Score | Orion Scorer(s) | Attendance |
|---|---|---|---|---|---|---|
| R1 | 6 September | Aberdeen | H | 1–5 | | |

=== 1893–94 ===
| Round | Date | Opponent | H/A | Score | Orion Scorer(s) | Attendance |
|---|---|---|---|---|---|---|
| R1 | 25 November | Leith Athletic | H | 2–11 | | |

=== 1894–95 ===
| Round | Date | Opponent | H/A | Score | Orion Scorer(s) | Attendance |
|---|---|---|---|---|---|---|
| R1 | 24 November | Dundee | A | 1–5 | | 3,000 |

=== 1896–97 ===
| Round | Date | Opponent | H/A | Score | Orion Scorer(s) | Attendance |
|---|---|---|---|---|---|---|
| R1 | 24 January | Falkirk | A | 0–2 | | |

=== 1897–98 ===
| Round | Date | Opponent | H/A | Score | Orion Scorer(s) | Attendance |
|---|---|---|---|---|---|---|
| R1 | 8 January | Dundee Wanderers | A | 2–3 | | 5,000 |

=== 1898–99 ===
| Round | Date | Opponent | H/A | Score | Orion Scorer(s) | Attendance |
|---|---|---|---|---|---|---|
| R1 | 14 January | Kilmarnock | H | 0–2 | | 5,000 |

=== 1899–1900 ===
| Round | Date | Opponent | H/A | Score | Orion Scorer(s) | Attendance |
|---|---|---|---|---|---|---|
| R1 | 13 January | Forres Mechanics | A | 1–1 | | 1,000 |
| R1 R | 20 January | Forres Mechanics | H | 4–1 | | 2,000 |
| R2 | 27 January | Kilmarnock | A | 1–10 | | 3,000 |

=== 1900–01 ===
| Round | Date | Opponent | H/A | Score | Orion Scorer(s) | Attendance |
|---|---|---|---|---|---|---|
| R1 | 23 January | Ayr | A | 2–2 | | 2,000 |
| R1 R | 23 January | Ayr | H | 1–3 | | 1,000 |

=== 1902–03 ===
| Round | Date | Opponent | H/A | Score | Orion Scorer(s) | Attendance |
|---|---|---|---|---|---|---|
| R1 | 24 January | Nithsdale Wanderers | A | 0–1 | | 500 |

== Honours ==
Northern League

- 1896–97, 1898–99

Aberdeenshire Cup

- 1890–91, 1894–95, 1896–97, 1898–99, 1900–01

Aberdeenshire Charity Cup

- 1893–94,1895–96, 1897–98

Aberdeen Charity Cup

- 1888–89, 1890–91

Gershon Cup

- 1893–94, 1894–95, 1896–97

Rhodesia Cup

- 1898–99, 1901–02

ADFA Hospital Tournament

- 1887–88
