= Mickey Lawson =

Scottish footballer and manager

Personal information
- Full name: Michael Alexander Lawson
- Date of birth: 23 May 1949 (age 77)
- Place of birth: Edinburgh, Scotland
- Position: Forward

Youth career
- Musselburgh Athletic

Senior career*
Years	Team	Apps	(Gls)
1971–1976	Stirling Albion	168	(94)
1976–1980	St Johnstone	98	(24)
1980–1981	Raith Rovers	25	(2)
1981–1982	Berwick Rangers	39	(16)
1982–1988	Meadowbank Thistle	169	(14)
Total		499	(150)

Managerial career
- 1991–1992: Arbroath
- 1994–1995: Meadowbank Thistle
- –2001: Whitehill Welfare
- 2001–2012: Spartans
- 2012–2015: Whitehill Welfare
- 2015–2016: Vale of Leithen
- * Club domestic league appearances and goals

Mickey Lawson (born 23 May 1949) is a Scottish former association football player and manager. He played for Stirling Albion, St Johnstone, Raith Rovers, Berwick Rangers and Meadowbank Thistle, and has since managed league sides Arbroath and Meadowbank Thistle. He has also managed non-league sides Whitehill Welfare and Spartans.

Lawson was appointed Spartans manager in 2001, and won six trophies in his first two seasons with the club. He has since guided the club to significant Scottish Cup runs, and was in charge when they (unsuccessfully) applied for membership of the Scottish Football League in 2008.

== Career statistics ==
Information sourced from Meadowbank Thistle Facts & Figures.

Appearances and goals by club, season and competition
Club	Season	League			Scottish Cup		League Cup		Spring Cup		Total	
Club	Season	Division	Apps	Goals	Apps	Goals	Apps	Goals	Apps	Goals	Apps	Goals
Stirling Albion	1971-72	Second Division	35	15	1	0	8	8	-	-	44	23
Stirling Albion	1972-73	Second Division	35	17	3	2	6	1	-	-	44	20
Stirling Albion	1973-74	Second Division	34	19	3	1	7	5	-	-	44	25
Stirling Albion	1974-75	Second Division	38	24	1	1	5	3	-	-	44	28
Stirling Albion	1975-76	Second Division	26	19	3	3	6	2	6	2	41	26
Stirling Albion	Total		168	94	11	7	32	19	6	2	217	122
St Johnstone	1976-77	First Division	29	6	2	0	1	0	-	-	32	6
St Johnstone	1977-78	First Division	24	3	1	0	2	0	-	-	27	3
St Johnstone	1978-79	First Division	24	11	2	1	1	0	-	-	27	12
St Johnstone	1979-80	First Division	21	4	0	0	4	1	-	-	25	5
St Johnstone	Total		98	24	5	1	8	1	-	-	111	26
Raith Rovers	1980-81	First Division	25	2	1	0	6	1	-	-	32	3
Raith Rovers	Total		25	2	1	0	6	1	-	-	32	3
Berwick Rangers	1981-82	Second Division	38	16	3	1	8	4	-	-	49	21
Berwick Rangers	1982-83	Second Division	1	0	0	0	5	1	-	-	6	1
Berwick Rangers	Total		39	16	3	1	13	5	-	-	55	22
Meadowbank Thistle	1982-83	Second Division	37	9	1	0	0	0	-	-	38	9
Meadowbank Thistle	1983-84	First Division	38	5	2	0	8	0	-	-	48	5
Meadowbank Thistle	1984-85	First Division	28	0	2	0	5	1	-	-	35	1
Meadowbank Thistle	1985-86	Second Division	32	0	1	0	0	0	-	-	33	0
Meadowbank Thistle	1986-87	Second Division	20	0	5	0	0	0	-	-	25	0
Meadowbank Thistle	1987-88	First Division	14	0	0	0	2	0	-	-	16	0
Meadowbank Thistle	Total		169	14	11	0	15	1	-	-	195	15
Career total			499	150	31	9	74	27	6	2	610	188
