= Lybster F.C. =

Association football club in Scotland

Lybster
- Full name: Lybster Football Club
- Founded: 1887
- Ground: Cow Park
- League: Caithness Amateur Football Association
Traditional colours	2024 colours

Lybster Football Club is a football club from Lybster in Caithness, Scotland.

== History ==
The club was founded in 1887 under the name Portland, often rendered as Portland Lybster, taking the name from the Duke of Portland, who owned an estate at Lybster, and who donated £1 to the club in 1891. Its first match was a defeat to local rivals Dunbeath in the Black Park in March 1887. William Alexander Mackay, the founder of Recreativo F.C., was a native of Lybster.

The club joined the Scottish Football Association as a senior club in 1889. This entitled the club to enter the Scottish Cup, which caused immediate problems because of its geographical isolation; its first round opponents in the 1889–90 Scottish Cup, the original Aberdeen club, protested to the Scottish FA because of the distance it would have to travel. Portland instead scratched from the competition, allegedly in return for a "consideration".

The club entered the competition again in 1890–91 and was given a bye in the first round. The club was drawn to visit Inverness Caledonian in the second and again scratched, unable to afford the journey. Understandably, the club did not enter the competition again.

Despite the club's seniority, it was not allowed into the first Caithness County League in 1927 because the club's pitch was in too poor a state. It did however join the League after World War 2 and won the title in 1954–55, 1955–56, and 1957–58. It has been known simply as Lybster since at least 2009.

== Colours ==
The club's original colours were blue and white striped shirts with white knickers, which were its colours in the early 2020s. Its other colours over the years include white shirts, navy shorts, and black socks in the 1950s, claret and light blue in the 1970s and 1980s, and lilac in the 2000s. As at 2024 the club was wearing all black with red trim.

== Ground ==
The club's original ground was at Back Park, until in 1925 it was developed into a golf course, and the club moved into Cow Park on the other side of Village Street.
