= Northern Football League (Scotland) =

Association football league in Scotland

Northern League
- Sport: Football
- Founded: 1891
- Folded: 1920
- No. of teams: Various
- Country: Scotland
- Last champion: Montrose
- Most titles: Dundee 'A' (5)

The Northern League was a regional Scottish football competition held between 1891 and 1920.

In 1908–09, six clubs left to form the Central Football League and the league shut down for the First World War, returning for a final season in 1919–20.

Dundee 'A' won the title five times, also sharing it on a sixth occasion.

== Details ==
=== History ===
Season	Winners
1891–92	Dundee East End & Dundee Our Boys
1892–93	Arbroath
1893–94	Unfinished
1894–95	Not held
1895–96	Forfar Athletic
1896–97	Orion
1897–98	Victoria United
1898–99	Orion
1899–1900	Dundee Wanderers
1900–01	Dundee 'A'
1901–02	Raith Rovers
1902–03	Dundee 'A'
1903–04	Montrose
1904–05	Dundee 'A'
1905–06	Aberdeen 'A'
1906–07	Kirkcaldy United & Dundee 'A'
1907–08	Brechin City
1908–09	Dundee 'A'
1909–10	Dundee 'A'
1910–11	Aberdeen 'A'
1911–12	Unfinished
1912–13	Brechin City
1913–14	Unfinished
1914–15	Forfar Athletic
1915–16	No competition due to war
1916–17	No competition due to war
1917–18	No competition due to war
1918–19	No competition due to war
1919–20	Montrose

=== Number of titles ===
Winners	Titles
Dundee 'A'	5
Aberdeen 'A'	2
Brechin City	2
Forfar Athletic	2
Montrose	2
Orion	2
Arbroath	1
Dundee Wanderers	1
Raith Rovers	1
Victoria United	1

Note: Two titles were also shared: the 1891–92 title between Dundee East End and Dundee Our Boys, and the 1906–07 title between Kirkcaldy United and Dundee 'A'. As neither title was won outright, they are not included in the above record.
