= Strathmore F.C. (Arbroath) =

Association football club in Angus, Scotland

Strathmore
- Full name: Strathmore Football Club
- Nickname(s): the Strathie
- Founded: 1879
- Dissolved: 1888
- Ground: Damley Park
1880–84 colours	1886–88 colours

Strathmore Football Club, usually referred to as Strathmore (Arbroath) to distinguish from Dundee Strathmore, was a Scottish association football club based in the town of Arbroath, Angus.

== History ==
The club was founded in 1879 and joined the Scottish Football Association in August 1883, playing in the Scottish Cup for five seasons between 1883 and 1888. Its best run was in 1885–86, reaching the fourth round, made up that season of 19 clubs. In the fourth round, the club put up a struggle at Abercorn F.C., equalising an early Abercorn goal and having another disallowed; at half-time, the Strathie was still in the game, 2–1 down, but Abercorn scored another five goals before Strathmore concluded the scoring with a late consolation.

The club's biggest competitive win came in its first tie in the first Forfarshire Cup in 1883, beating the Clydesdale (Dundee) club 13–0. In the 1884–85 edition of the Forfarshire Cup, the club reached the final against Dundee Harp. The original match, at Rollo's Pier, the home of the Strathmore (Dundee) club, saw the Arbroath side take a goal lead early on, but they visibly tired and were lucky to hang on to a draw. The replay at the same venue, like the original match, attracted a crowd of 8,000. Strathmore was unlucky to lose the toss, and had to play in the first half into the wind and with the sun shining in the goalkeeper's face, but even those factors could not explain going in at half-time 8–0 down. The match ended 15–1.

In reality, the club had never been much more than a "feeder" club to Arbroath, and its last Scottish Cup tie was a 13–1 defeat to Dundee East End F.C. at Damley Park in 1887, before a "rather small attendance", the result "being a foregone conclusion"; the final recorded match for the club was a 6–2 defeat at Montrose in March 1888. The club was formally struck from the Scottish FA register in August 1888, although there was a one-off resuscitation of the name for a defeat at Brechin in April 1889.

== Colours ==
From 1880 to 1884, the club wore navy blue shirts and white shorts, and reversed the colours from 1884 to 1886. In 1886, the club changed to black and gold striped shirts with navy blue shorts.

== Ground ==
The club originally played on the Low Common in Arbroath. From 1883 the club played at Damley Park.

== Notable players ==
- John Petrie played for the club before joining Arbroath.
