= Jocky Petrie (footballer) =

Scottish footballer (1867–1932)

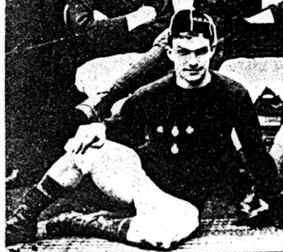
- Petrie pictured in 1885

Personal information
- Full name: John Hosie Petrie
- Date of birth: 21 June 1867
- Place of birth: Arbroath, Scotland
- Date of death: 13 July 1932 (aged 65)
- Place of death: Arbroath, Scotland
- Position: Right winger

Youth career
- Alpine and Crown

Senior career*
Years	Team	Apps	(Gls)
- Strathmore
1885–1891	Arbroath		
1891–1892	Distillery		
1892–1900	Arbroath		
- * Club domestic league appearances and goals

John Hosie "Jocky" Petrie (21 June 1867 – 13 July 1932) was a Scottish footballer who played for Arbroath as a forward. He holds the record for the most goals ever scored in a senior British football game with 13 goals.

== Career ==
Petrie signed for Arbroath from local club Strathmore. On 12 September 1885, Petrie, at the age of 18, scored 13 times for Arbroath in a record 36–0 win over Bon Accord. In 1891, Petrie signed for Distillery, playing in the Irish League for a season, before returning to Arbroath. After retiring from football, Petrie later held roles as a kitman, trainer and groundsman for Arbroath until his retirement in 1920, where his career was commemorated with a benefit match against rivals Forfar Athletic, held on his behalf.

=== Aftermath ===
At an international level, his record was not equaled until 2001 by Archie Thompson who scored 13 goals for Australia in a 31–0 win over American Samoa.

A street in Arbroath, Petrie Way, is named in his honour.

In 2017, Petrie was inducted into Arbroath's hall of fame.
