= Victoria United F.C. (Scotland) =

Former association football club in Scotland

Victoria United
- Full name: Victoria United Football Club
- Nicknames: the Vics, the Iron Dukes
- Founded: 1889
- Dissolved: 1903
- Ground: Central Park; Aberdeen
- Hon. Secretary: Peter Bissett
- Match Secretary: W. F. Davidson
Home colours

Victoria United Football Club was a Scottish football team that played in the city of Aberdeen. Along with Orion and Aberdeen (1881), it is one of the three clubs which merged to form the current Aberdeen F.C.

== History ==
The club was formed on 25 June 1889, at a meeting in the Victoria Bridge Recreation Ground Rooms. The club was able instantly to call upon several Aberdeen Rovers players, plus Morrison, the captain of Orion. The prime mover for the new club was Joseph Edwards, a former manager of Derby County, who had moved to Aberdeen to manage the Recreation Ground.

It entered the Scottish Cup for the first time in 1889–90, but lost in the first round in its first two entries - the second time dominating the game against Caledonian of Aberdeen, but conceding two breakaway goals for a shock elimination. Qualifying rounds were then brought in and the Vics, alone amongst the three senior clubs, never made it to the first round proper.

Its first triumph of note was winning the Aberdeenshire Cup in 1891–92, the last of the senior Aberdeen sides to do so. It also won the trophy in three of the next four seasons. The Vics also won one Northern League championship, in 1897–98, and the Rhodesia Cup (contested between the three senior Aberdeen clubs) in 1899–1900 and 1902–03 .

At the end of the 1901–02 season, the local council wrote to the three main town clubs in relation to the unsafe conditions of their grounds. The financial difficulties led to Aberdeen looking to lease out the Pittodrie ground to Hibernian, which was facing eviction from Easter Road, and the shock of the proposal led to local discussions about forming a single Aberdeen club to join the Scottish Football League, led by Orion's George Alexander. Following discussions between the clubs and the Crescent Cricket Club (which owned Pittodrie), a deal was signed on 10 April 1903 to merge the three clubs under the Aberdeen name. Not all of the Vics' players and fans moved over to the new combine, six of the players joining the newly-senior Bon Accord, and some of the supporters followed suit.

The club's final triumph was securing the Rhodesia Cup round-robin tournament with a 2–2 draw with Aberdeen at Central Park in May 1903, coming from two goals down. Its final game was also a 2–2 draw, at home to Arbroath in the Northern League.

== Colours ==
The club resolved to play in light blue shirts and dark blue knickers at its initial meeting, and retained the light blue jerseys for its existence, other than dallying with dark blue in 1896–97.

== Ground ==
The club originally played at the Victoria Bridge Recreation Grounds in Aberdeen. In 1892, the club took a lease over land reclaimed from the River Don, close to the Wellington Bridge, hence the club being nicknamed the Iron Dukes; the ground was duly known as the Wellington Grounds. In September 1894 the club returned to its original home, the first match back being an 8–1 Scottish Cup Preliminary Round win over Peterhead, and in 1900 the club moved to Central Park in Kittybrewster, the now-vacant former home of the original Aberdeen club.

== Former players ==
1. Players that have played/managed in the Scottish Football League or any foreign equivalent to this level (i.e. fully professional league).
2. Players with full international caps.
3. Players that hold a club record or have captained the club.

- (Scotland) Alex Caie

== Honours ==
- Northern League
  - Winner: 1897–98
- Aberdeenshire Cup
  - Winner: 1891–92, 1892–93, 1893–94, 1895–96, 1899–1900, 1902–03
  - Runner-up: 1896–97, 1898–99, 1900–01, 1901–02
- Rhodesia Cup
  - Winner: 1899–1900, 1902–03

== Scottish Cup Record ==
=== 1889–90 ===
Round	Date	Opponent	H/A	Score	Victoria United Scorer(s)	Attendance
R1	7 September	Orion	A	1–3		

=== 1890–91 ===
Round	Date	Opponent	H/A	Score	Victoria United Scorer(s)	Attendance
R1	6 September	Caledonian (Aberdeen)	A	1–2		
