= Aberdeen F.C. (1881) =

Former association football club in Scotland

Aberdeen
- Full name: Aberdeen Football Club
- Nickname: the Whites
- Founded: 1881
- Dissolved: 1903
- Ground: Pittodrie Park; Aberdeen
Home colours

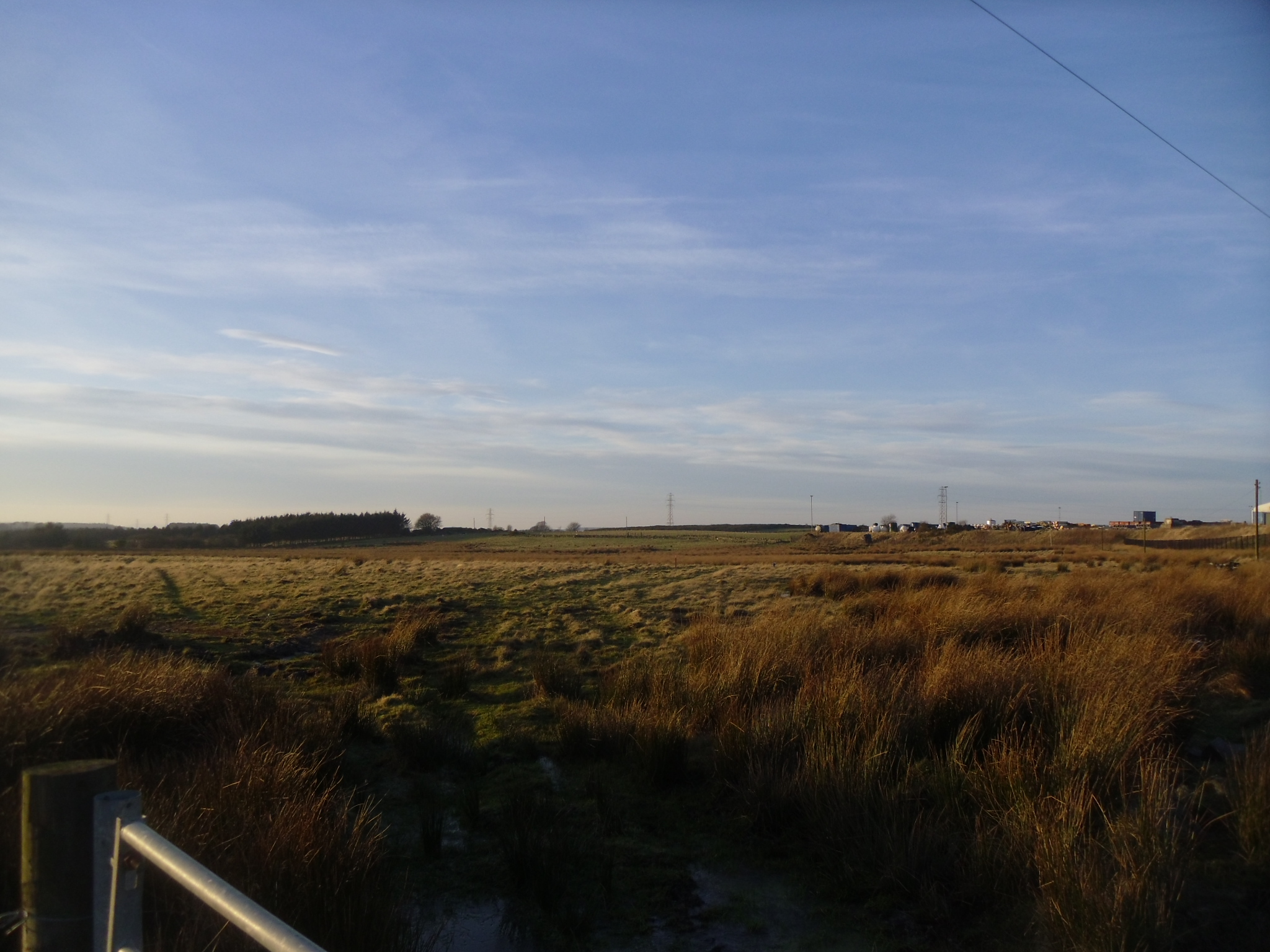
The site for Aberdeen FC’s new stadium.

Aberdeen Football Club was a Scottish football team formed in 1881. On 14 April 1903 it merged with the two other Aberdeen clubs Victoria United and Orion to form the current Aberdeen Football Club.

== History ==
The club's first-ever game was a 1–4 defeat at Coupar Angus. The club was the first from the Granite City to play in the Scottish FA Cup, its first Scottish Cup tie being against Harp in 1882. It was also the first Aberdeen side to win a Scottish Cup tie, beating Lindertis in the first round in 1884–85, turning a one goal deficit at half-time into a 4–1 win; and its run to the fourth round in 1889–90 (last 24) was the best of any Aberdonian side before the merger. The fourth round tie with Queen's Park at the Chanonry was considered such an event that other matches due that day were postponed, but, as expected, Aberdeen was outclassed, scoring its only goal (through Thompson) when already 8–0 down, Queen's Park finally settling for 13. With no hard feelings the clubs supped together afterwards in Hay's Café.

The club won the first edition of the Aberdeenshire Cup in 1887–88, and retained the title for the next two seasons. It finally lost its grip in 1890–91 in controversial circumstances. At the quarter-final stage, Aberdeen was drawn at home to fellow Aberdeen side Caledonian, and, in front of a big crowd, won 6–4. However the Caley protested on several grounds, blaming the referee, Mr Curran (a late replacement for the engaged official) for allowing Aberdeen 2 goals which should have been disallowed, and costing Caley one goal which should have been given; Curran had some recent history with the Caledonian, which had protested about his expenses claims for an earlier tie. The Aberdeenshire FA upheld the protest, and ordered a replay of the tie on Boxing Day. The Caley turned up, but Aberdeen had already resolved not to turn up on the basis that the protest was not merely improper, but was not heard under the Association rules; and the Caley was awarded the tie. Aberdeen gained a revenge over the local association by hosting a lucrative friendly with Arbroath on the day of the final, and duly drew a 25% bigger gate.

In 1891, Aberdeen became a founder member of the newly formed Northern League. Although it beat the two other major sides in the town (Orion and Victoria United) as a member by some years, unlike its two rivals, it never won the title; its best finish was 4th in 1899–1900.

At the end of the 1901–02 season, the local council wrote to the three main town clubs in relation to the unsafe conditions of their grounds. The financial difficulties led to Aberdeen looking to lease out the Pittodrie ground to Hibernian, which was facing eviction from Easter Road, and the shock of the proposal led to local discussions about forming a single Aberdeen club to join the Scottish Football League, led by Orion's George Alexander. Following discussions between the club and the Crescent Cricket Club (which owned Pittodrie), a deal was signed on 10 April 1903 to merge the three clubs under the Aberdeen name.

== Stadium ==
On 1 February 1899, the club moved into Pittodrie Stadium which had previously been a dung hill for the city's police horses. They had previously played at Holburn Cricket Ground, the Aberdeen Grammar School grounds and The Chanonry.

== Playing colours ==
The club's first adopted schema was maroon jerseys with blue (serge) knickers. For most of its history (1888 to 1903), the club's colours were white shirt, blue (serge) knickers, and blue socks.

== Scottish Cup Record ==
=== 1882–83 ===
| Round | Date | Opponent | H/A | Score | Aberdeen Scorer(s) | Attendance |
|---|---|---|---|---|---|---|
| R2 | 30 September | Dundee Harp | A | 2–2 | | |
| R2 R | 7 October | Dundee Harp | A | 1–7 | | |

=== 1883–84 ===
| Round | Date | Opponent | H/A | Score | Aberdeen Scorer(s) | Attendance |
|---|---|---|---|---|---|---|
| R1 | 8 September | Arbroath | A | 2–2 | | |
| R1 R | 15 September | Arbroath | A | 0–7 | | |

=== 1884–85 ===
| Round | Date | Opponent | H/A | Score | Aberdeen Scorer(s) | Attendance |
|---|---|---|---|---|---|---|
| R1 | 13 September | Lindertis | A | 4–1 | | |
| R2 | 4 October | Arbroath | H | 1–7 | | |

=== 1885–86 ===
| Round | Date | Opponent | H/A | Score | Aberdeen Scorer(s) | Attendance |
|---|---|---|---|---|---|---|
| R1 | 12 September | Strathmore | A | 0–7 | | |

=== 1886–87 ===
| Round | Date | Opponent | H/A | Score | Aberdeen Scorer(s) | Attendance |
|---|---|---|---|---|---|---|
| R1 | 11 September | Dundee East End | A | W/O | | |

=== 1887–88 ===
| Round | Date | Opponent | H/A | Score | Aberdeen Scorer(s) | Attendance |
|---|---|---|---|---|---|---|
| R1 | 3 September | Dundee Our Boys | H | 4–9 | | |

=== 1888–89 ===
| Round | Date | Opponent | H/A | Score | Aberdeen Scorer(s) | Attendance |
|---|---|---|---|---|---|---|
| R1 | 1 September | Arbroath | H | 3–4 | | |

=== 1889–90 ===
| Round | Date | Opponent | H/A | Score | Aberdeen Scorer(s) | Attendance |
|---|---|---|---|---|---|---|
| R1 | 31 August | Portland Lybster | H | W/O | | |
| R2 | 28 September | Orion | H | 2–1 | | |
| R3 | 19 October | Forfar Athletic | H | 5–3 | | |
| R4 | 9 November | Queen's Park | H | 1–13 | | |

=== 1890–91 ===
| Round | Date | Opponent | H/A | Score | Aberdeen Scorer(s) | Attendance |
|---|---|---|---|---|---|---|
| R1 | 6 September | Orion | A | 5–1 | | |
| R2 | 27 September | Caledonian Rangers | H | 8–0 | | |
| R3 | 18 October | Inverness Caledonian | A | 2–6 | | |

=== 1891–92 ===
| Round | Date | Opponent | H/A | Score | Aberdeen Scorer(s) | Attendance |
|---|---|---|---|---|---|---|
| R1 | 5 December | Mid Annandale | H | 2–6 | | |

=== 1892–93 ===
| Round | Date | Opponent | H/A | Score | Aberdeen Scorer(s) | Attendance |
|---|---|---|---|---|---|---|
| R1 | 26 November | St Mirren | H | 4–6 | | 12,000 |

== Aberdeen F.C. Sevens ==
The football club ran a Sports Day from 1887 at its Chanonry Ground. In 1889 it introduced rugby sevens as one of the various sports in its Sports Day. The Sports Day concept proved so popular that it often was spread over a week, resulting in a Finals day on the Saturday with prizes awarded.

Thus Aberdeen was the first place outside of the Scottish Borders to host a Sevens tournament, barring a few isolated sevens matches in England.

The club ran its Sports Day with a rugby sevens tournament included to 1893; with Aberdeen University RFC winning all but one tournament. From 1894 the rugby sevens tournament was dropped from its Sports Day.

== Honours ==
Aberdeenshire Cup

- 1887–88, 1888–89, 1889–90, 1897–98, 1901–02

Aberdeen Charity Cup

- 1892–93
