= Gayfield Park =

Football stadium in Arbroath, Scotland

- Gayfield
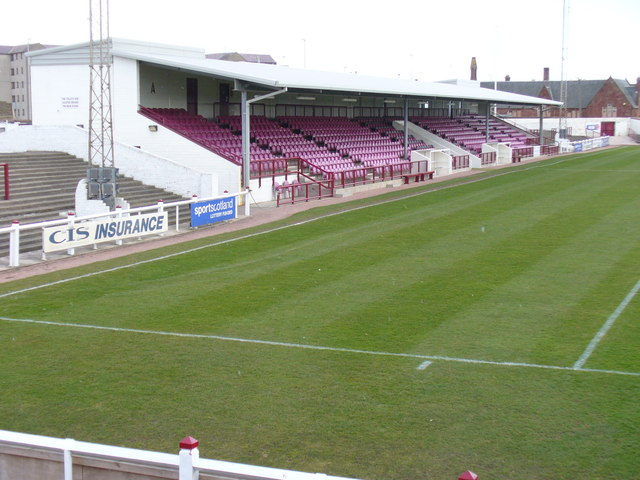
- The main stand at Gayfield

- Location in Angus
- Location: Arbroath, Angus, Scotland
- Coordinates: 56°33′08″N 2°35′29″W
- Owner: Arbroath F.C.
- Capacity: 6,600 (861 seated)
- Surface: Grass
- Record attendance: 13,510 (23 February 1952, Arbroath v Rangers)
- Field size: 115 yd × 71 yd (105 m × 65 m)
- Public transit: Arbroath railway station

Construction
- Opened: 1880
- Renovated: 1925

Tenant
- Arbroath F.C. (1880–Present)

Gayfield Park, commonly known as Gayfield, is a football stadium in Arbroath, Angus, Scotland. It is the home ground of Scottish Professional Football League team Arbroath F.C. The club have played at Gayfield since 1880, although the pitch has only been on its current alignment since the ground was redeveloped in 1925. The ground has a capacity of 6,600, including 861 seats.

== History ==
Arbroath F.C. was formed in 1878 and played at Woodville Park and Hospitalfield before acquiring a former rubbish tip on the seafront to build Gayfield. The new ground was opened in 1880, with the first match being a Scottish Cup tie against Rob Roy. The original site was very cramped, with no room for spectators on the Dundee Road side; when Rangers lost to Arbroath in the Scottish Cup they complained that the pitch wasn't playable due to its size, saying they had been "beaten on a back green", and won the rematch. In September 1885, Arbroath played Bon Accord in the Scottish Cup at Gayfield and won 36–0, which remains a British record score for a senior football match.

Arbroath joined the Scottish Football League in 1921, with the first League match at Gayfield being against Johnstone. The club's plans to construct a "Greater Gayfield" led to the pitch being moved 60 yards, so that the original halfway line became the goal line and a stand could be constructed along Dundee Road. The new ground was opened on 29 August 1925 against East Fife. Gayfield's record attendance of 13,510 was set against Rangers in February 1952. Floodlights were first installed in 1955. The main stand had to be rebuilt following a fire in 1958. This stand was replaced in 2002 by the present main stand, which was extended in 2010.

Upgrades to the stadium exterior (main front wall, club shop, turnstiles and main entrance) were carried out in 2022, replacing structures which had been largely unchanged since 1925.

== Structure and facilities ==
Gayfield is situated on the sea front, to the west of Arbroath harbour, on the southern edge of the town. Due to its position next to the North Sea, in winter spectators can be exposed to severe cold and winds.

The ground has a capacity of 6,600. The only seating area is the single tier, covered, Gayfield Stand. The stand was opened in 2002 and seats 861 spectators. The stadium has standing terracing around the entire pitch with covered pleasureland stand (South End), the East Terrace and the bellrock buffet stand (North End). When segregation is required, the away support is allocated the pleasureland stand End and half of the East Terrace, but this can be reduced to just the pleasureland end if required. The pitch size is 115 by 71 yards (105 m × 65 m).

== Records ==
- Record attendance: 13,510 v Rangers, Scottish Cup 3rd round, 23 February 1952
