= Aberdeenshire Cup =

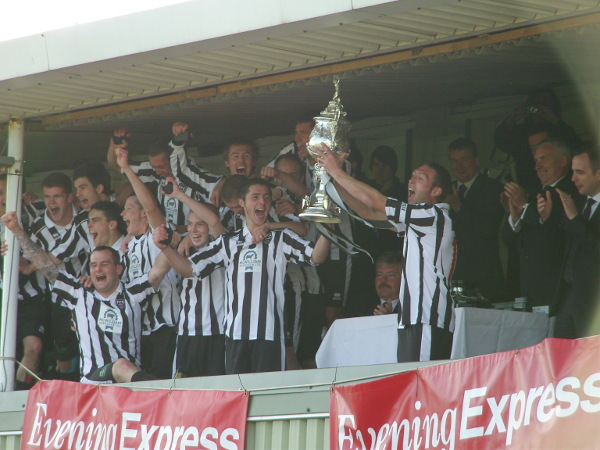
- Fraserburgh lifting the 2012–13 cup
- Founded: 1887
- Region: Aberdeenshire & District
- Current champions: Aberdeen
- Most championships: Aberdeen (36 titles)

The Aberdeenshire Cup is a Scottish football tournament for all senior clubs affiliated to the Aberdeenshire and District Football Association (ADFA), being clubs from the historic counties of Aberdeenshire and Banffshire. The Aberdeenshire Cup is currently sponsored by the Evening Express newspaper.

Aberdeen are the most successful team in the competition, having won the cup thirty-six times. They are also the current holders, having defeated Formartine United on penalties after a 2–2 draw in the 2025–26 final at Harlaw Park in Inverurie.

== Origin ==
The competition was first held in 1887 and was organised by the ADFA which formed the same year. The first members were Aberdeen, Orion, Caledonian, Aberdeen Athletic, Aberdeen Rovers, Aberdeen Rangers, Bon Accord, Black Diamond, Turriff Our Boys, Albert, Rosebery, Britannia, Granite City, Aberdeen City Wanderers and Balmoral. Dr Maitland Moir, honorary president, presented the ADFA with a cup which ultimately became the property of Aberdeen after their second win in 1889. After this the ADFA bought a new trophy which was first presented after the final in 1890. The whereabouts of the original trophy is currently unknown.

== Winners ==
Season	Winner
1887–88	Aberdeen FC (1881)
1888–89	Aberdeen FC (1881)
1889–90	Aberdeen FC (1881)
1890–91	Orion
1891–92	Victoria United
1892–93	Victoria United
1893–94	Victoria United
1894–95	Orion
1895–96	Victoria United
1896–97	Orion
1897–98	Aberdeen FC (1881)
1898–99	Orion
1899–1900	Victoria United
1900–01	Orion
1901–02	Aberdeen FC (1881)
1902–03	Victoria United
1903–04	Aberdeen
1904–05	Aberdeen
1905–06	Peterhead
1906–07	Aberdeen
1907–08	Aberdeen
1908–09	Aberdeen
1909–10	Aberdeen
1910–11	Fraserburgh
1911–12	Aberdeen
1912–13	Aberdeen
1913–14	Aberdeen
1914–15	Aberdeen
1915–16	No competition due to First World War
1916–17	No competition due to First World War
1917–18	No competition due to First World War
1918–19	No competition due to First World War
1919–20	Aberdeen
1920–21	Aberdeen University
1921–22	Aberdeen
1922–23	Aberdeen
1923–24	Aberdeen
1924–25	Aberdeen
1925–26	Aberdeen
1926–27	Aberdeen
1927–28	Aberdeen
1928–29	Aberdeen
1929–30	Aberdeen
1930–31	Aberdeen
1931–32	Aberdeen
1932–33	Aberdeen
1933–34	Aberdeen
1934–35	Peterhead
1935–36	Peterhead
1936–37	Buckie Thistle
1937–38	Fraserburgh
1938–39	Buckie Thistle
1939–40	No competition due to Second World War
1940–41	No competition due to Second World War
1941–42	No competition due to Second World War
1942–43	No competition due to Second World War
1943–44	No competition due to Second World War
1944–45	No competition due to Second World War
1945–46	Buckie Thistle
1946–47	Peterhead
1947–48	Deveronvale
1948–49	Peterhead
1949–50	Peterhead
1950–51	Deveronvale
1951–52	Deveronvale
1952–53	Buckie Thistle
1953–54	Buckie Thistle
1954–55	Buckie Thistle
1955–56	Fraserburgh
1956–57	Buckie Thistle
1957–58	Keith
1958–59	Peterhead
1959–60	Keith
1960–61	Huntly
1961–62	Deveronvale
1962–63	Peterhead
1963–64	Fraserburgh
1964–65	Peterhead
1965–66	Deveronvale
1966–67	Keith
1967–68	Peterhead
1968–69	Peterhead
1969–70	Peterhead
1970–71	Peterhead
1971–72	Peterhead
1972–73	Fraserburgh
1973–74	Keith
1974–75	Peterhead
1975–76	Fraserburgh
1976–77	Peterhead
1977–78	Keith
1978–79	Peterhead
1979–80	Keith
1980–81	Aberdeen
1981–82	Aberdeen
1982–83	Aberdeen
1983–84	Peterhead
1984–85	Buckie Thistle
1985–86	Huntly
1986–87	Buckie Thistle
1987–88	Aberdeen
1988–89	Peterhead
1989–90	Aberdeen
1990–91	Aberdeen
1991–92	Huntly
1992–93	Aberdeen
1993–94	Huntly
1994–95	Huntly
1995–96	Huntly
1996–97	Fraserburgh
1997–98	Aberdeen
1998–99	Peterhead
1999–2000	Huntly
2000–01	Deveronvale
2001–02	Cove Rangers
2002–03	Aberdeen
2003–04	Aberdeen
2004–05	Aberdeen
2005–06	Buckie Thistle
2006–07	Deveronvale
2007–08	Buckie Thistle
2008–09	Keith
2009–10	Buckie Thistle
2010–11	Cove Rangers
2011–12	Deveronvale
2012–13	Fraserburgh
2013–14	Formartine United
2014–15	Fraserburgh
2015–16	Fraserburgh
2016–17	Buckie Thistle
2017–18	Formartine United
2018–19	Cove Rangers
2019–20	Fraserburgh
2020–21	Fraserburgh
2021–22	Banks o' Dee
2022–23	Fraserburgh
2023–24	Inverurie Loco Works
2024–25	Banks o' Dee
2025–26	Aberdeen

== List of winners ==
Club	Wins	Last win
Aberdeen	36	2025–26
Peterhead	20	1998–99
Fraserburgh	13	2022–23
Buckie Thistle	13	2016–17
Deveronvale	8	2011–12
Keith	7	2008–09
Huntly	7	1999–00
Victoria United	6	1902–03
Aberdeen FC (1881)	5	1901–02
Orion	5	1900–01
Cove Rangers	3	2018–19
Banks o' Dee	2	2024–25
Formartine United	2	2017–18
Inverurie Loco Works	1	2023–24
Aberdeen University	1	1920–21
