= Arbroath F.C. =

Scottish football club

Arbroath
- Full name: Arbroath Football Club
- Nicknames: The Red Lichties; The Smokies
- Founded: 1 July 1878; 148 years ago
- Ground: Gayfield Park, Arbroath
- Capacity: 6,056 (861 Seated)
- Chairman: Brian Cargill
- Co-managers: David Gold; Colin Hamilton
- League: Scottish Championship
- 2025–26: Scottish Championship, 3rd of 10
- Website: www.arbroathfc.co.uk
Home colours

Arbroath Football Club is a semi-professional Scottish football club based in the town of Arbroath, Angus. They currently play in the Scottish Championship. The club was founded in 1878 and plays home matches at Gayfield Park. They play in maroon strips and are nicknamed "The Red Lichties" due to the red light that used to guide fishing boats back from the North Sea to the Burgh's harbour. The Red Lichties share a long-standing and fierce rivalry with local neighbours Montrose, as well as with fellow local sides Forfar Athletic and Brechin City.

== History ==
=== Record score ===
The Red Lichties most notable and lasting accomplishment is to hold the world record for the biggest victory in World senior football, set on 12 September 1885 when they beat Bon Accord 36–0 in a Scottish Cup match, with a further five to seven goals disallowed for offside. Jocky Petrie scored 13 goals in that game, a record for the most goals by a single player in a British senior match.

=== Recent history ===
The Red Lichties have had mixed success in recent years. In the 1996–97 season they hit the bottom of Scottish senior football as they finished last in the Third Division. However, the following season they were promoted back to the Second Division. They spent three years at this level before winning promotion to the First Division. They finished 7th in their first season in the First Division, 13 points clear of relegation troubles. However, in the 2002–03 season, the Red Lichties struggled badly, and finished bottom of the table, 20 points adrift of penultimate side Alloa Athletic. In the 2003–04 season, the Red Lichties narrowly avoided back-to-back relegations, as they escaped the drop on the last day of the season. In 2004–05, however, there was no escaping a 3–0 defeat at Dumbarton on 30 April 2005, which consigned the Red Lichties to the Third Division for the following season. The club rose from the depths of the Third Division to the heights of the First Division, then fell back down to the basement league in the next few seasons. However, under manager John McGlashan, the Red Lichties competed at the top of Division 3, finishing 4th in their first season and second in the next, reaching both divisional play-offs in seasons 2005–06 and 2006–07, although failing to gain promotion. They finished fourth in Division 3 and disposed of Cowdenbeath 2–1 on aggregate thanks to a late extra time winner from Robbie Raeside in the semifinal. Stranraer were the opponents in the play-off final and the Red Lichties ran out 2–0 winners in the home tie first leg at Gayfield Park thanks to a Robbie Raeside header and a Barry Sellars strike. At Stranraer, the Red Lichties goal was pummelled for much of the match and they spent much of the second half down to 10 men after Craig Tully had been red-carded. Although one goal was conceded, a resolute defence saw the Red Lichties hold on for a 2–1 aggregate win and promotion.

The Red Lichties managed to consolidate their position in Division 2 in 2008–09. The season had started well but a narrow defeat in the Scottish League Cup at Gayfield Park on penalties to Scottish Premiership side Inverness Caledonian Thistle FC, triggered a sequence of losses and the club found themselves in the bottom half of the table. The performances were boosted by loan additions such as Steven Doris, Craig Forsyth, ex-Scotland international Colin Cameron and they got results when it mattered. Safety was all but assured with a narrow 1–0 win over Queens Park at Hampden Park, courtesy of a fine Robbie Ross strike and a 2–0 victory over Stranraer at Gayfield Park with goals from Ross and Forsyth. A 2–2 draw against Peterhead and a 0–0 draw against Raith Rovers in May was enough to seal 7th spot.

During season 2009–10, results seemed to go into freefall after a 6–0 home defeat to St Johnstone in the Scottish League Cup early in the season. John McGlashan resigned to be replaced by Jim Weir who after a mixed start eventually rallied the Red Lichties to a spirited last few weeks of the season. With a win needed against East Fife to avoid the play-offs, the side threw everything they had in the last 20 minutes to find a winner but to no avail. After beating Queens Park in the play-off semifinal, their season ended with a 2–0 loss to Forfar Athletic in the final. Weir resigned to take up the vacant position at Brechin City and was replaced, on 27 May, by Paul Sheerin.

On 23 April 2011, the Red Lichties defeated local rivals Montrose 4–1 to win the 2010–11 Third Division title, securing the club's first senior honours in their 133-year history and a return to Second Division at their first attempt. The next few seasons in the third tier (renamed League One) were mixed. A tremendous first season playing lively attacking football saw them run champions Cowdenbeath closely, more than matching them in head-to-head encounters but lacking the professional edge to grind out other results and losing the final three. The Red Lichties finished on 60 points and went out in the playoff semifinal. In 2012–13, a fairly mediocre season saw them end up in 5th spot, on 52 points just pipped for the final playoff spot. One highlight was a 3rd Round Scottish Cup tie at Celtic Park, drawing 1–1 and then exiting in the replay after an equaliser was controversially ruled out.

Season 2013–14 was disastrous. After an average start, a run of 14 games without a win saw the Red Lichties end up bottom of the pile on 31 points and automatically relegated. The attack-minded and purist emphasis of manager Sheerin, who continued as player-manager, meant most fans stayed supportive. Some poor signings were costly. The Red Lichties thus experienced their fourth relegation in 11 years. Sheerin left Gayfield Park in June 2014 to take up a post with the Under-20 side at Aberdeen. Allan Moore was subsequently appointed with Todd Lumsden as assistant. On Sunday, 12 April 2015, after a string of poor results in which the side only won once in 16 games, Moore was relieved of his duties as Manager and Lumsden took the helm. The team had been sitting at the top of the table by eight points in December but ended up finishing third and subsequently lost 3–2 on aggregate to Queens Park in the play-off semi-final.

The team performed poorly under the management of Todd Lumsden in season 2015–16 which was reflected by a lowly league position. With relegation into the Highland League a real threat, Lumsden was sacked in March 2016. Dick Campbell was then appointed and was able to steer the team to safety, finishing 9th and ahead of East Stirlingshire who were subsequently relegated after losing the play off to Lowland League champions Edinburgh City.

The 2016–17 season saw a massive turnaround under the helm of Campbell. They spent much of the season in second place behind Forfar Athletic and in early February were 11 points behind their Angus neighbours after a 1–0 defeat by the Loons at Gayfield Park. The Red Lichties however clawed that difference back and after the penultimate game of the season's 3–2 win against Elgin City, found themselves a point ahead at the top of the table with an away match against Stirling Albion remaining. An astonishing 1200 fans travelled to Forthbank to witness a 1–1 draw but with Forfar unexpectedly losing at home to Annan 4–2, the title was secured.

The 2018–19 season saw Arbroath line-up alongside the three other Angus sides in the same League for the first time in 25 years. Despite having to compete with full-time Raith Rovers, the club led from the opening day to win a second promotion in three years and a first league title win in the third tier. The Championship was secured on 13 April with a 1–1 draw at local rivals Brechin.

Returning to the second tier for the first time since being relegated in the 2002–03 season, Arbroath were never in any real danger of an immediate return to League One and spent most of the season on the fringe of the promotion playoff positions. Highlights of the League campaign included two victories against Inverness Caledonian Thistle and a 1–0 win against Dundee United, which made Arbroath the only side to defeat the eventual champions at Tannadice in the League that season. When the season was brought to an early conclusion, Campbell had led Arbroath to an impressive 5th-place finish.

Arbroath's good form continued into the first half of the 2021–22 season; as of the beginning of 2022 they were sitting close to the top of the Championship, and in with a serious chance of gaining promotion to the top flight for the first time since the 1974–75 season. The club went on to finish in second place where they had found themselves "minutes from immortality" having led against Kilmarnock thanks to a James Craigen goal. The promotion playoffs loomed but the club missed out on promotion having lost to Inverness Caledonian Thistle in a penalty shootout at Gayfield.

The 2022–23 season saw the club retain their place in the Championship on the final day of the season, securing a point against Hamilton Academical at Gayfield Park.

Midway through the 2023–24 season, after losing to The Spartans in the Scottish Cup, manager Dick Campbell and his coaching team resigned from their positions. The club recruited former Ross County, Dunfermline and Cove Rangers manager Jim McIntyre before going on to suffer the worst injury crisis in the clubs recent history culminating in relegation back to League One after losing 5–0 to Ayr United on 13 April 2024.

The beginning of 2024–25 saw the poor run continue with Manager Jim McIntyre being replaced by co-player-managers Colin Hamilton and David Gold after losing 3–0 to Kelty Hearts on 17 August 2024.

On 12 April 2025 Arbroath became champions of Scottish League 1 after defeating Stenhousemuir 4–0.

== Stadium ==
The Red Lichties Gayfield Park is not the club's original ground, which was nearby and was known as Lesser Gayfield. The current ground is the closest to the sea in Britain, a traditional style ground exposed to the elements, where opposition fans mixing as they change ends at half time to stand behind the goal their side is attacking was observed until only a few years ago. There is terracing on three sides and enclosed stands on all four sides. On stormy winter days, waves beat on the walls surrounding the ground.

== Rivalries ==
Arbroath's main rivalry is with Montrose. The first meeting of the sides was in 1888 and Arbroath ran out 6–2 winners. They also have lesser rivalries with fellow senior Angus clubs Brechin City and Forfar Athletic. In the 2018–2019 season, all four senior Angus teams competed in Scottish League One.

== First-team squad ==
As of 3 October 2026

Note: Flags indicate national team as defined under FIFA eligibility rules; some limited exceptions apply. Players may hold more than one non-FIFA nationality.

No.	Pos.	Nation	Player
1	GK	SCO	Aidan McAdams
2	DF	SCO	Stuart Morrison
3	DF	SCO	Colin Hamilton
4	DF	SCO	Brody Paterson
5	DF	SCO	Thomas O'Brien (captain)
6	MF	AUS	Tom Beadling
7	MF	SCO	David Gold
8	MF	SCO	Ryan Flynn
9	FW	SCO	Andy Winter
10	FW	SCO	Gavin Reilly
11	MF	SCO	Ryan Dow
12	MF	SCO	Scott Stewart
14	FW	SCO	Michael McKenna

No.	Pos.	Nation	Player
15	MF	SCO	Scott McGill
16	DF	SCO	Craig Watson
17	MF	SCO	Dylan Reid
19	MF	SCO	Cormac Daly (on loan from Hearts)
20	MF	SCO	Scott Constable (on loan from Dundee United)
21	GK	SCO	Jordan Pettigrew
22	DF	ENG	Charlie Dewar (on loan from Dundee United)
23	MF	SCO	Jude Bonnar (on loan from Celtic)
24	MF	SCO	Rudi Molotnikov (on loan from Hibernian)
25	MF	SCO	Jacob MacIntyre (on loan from Hibernian)
26	DF	SCO	Sean Mackie
27	MF	SCO	Kyle Magennis

=== On loan ===
Note: Flags indicate national team as defined under FIFA eligibility rules; some limited exceptions apply. Players may hold more than one non-FIFA nationality.

No.	Pos.	Nation	Player
18	MF	SCO	Calvin Beattie (on loan at East Fife)

== Club officials ==
=== Coaching staff ===
- Co-managers: David Gold and Colin Hamilton
- First team coach: Colin Jack
- Goalkeeping coach: Alan Combe
- Club doctor: Callum Innes
- Physiotherapist: Mark Dryden
- Sports scientist: Lewis Grant

=== Executive ===
- Chairman: Brian Cargill
- Chief executive officer: Paul Reid
- Secretary: Gary Callon
- Directors: Jon Bruce, Scott Milne, Barclay Scott, Neil Smyth
- Finance director: Robert Sim
- Club ambassadors: Bobby Linn, Alan Soutar

== Managers ==
- (Scotland) Bob McGlashan (1927–1946)
- (Scotland) Archie Anderson (1946–1949)
- (Scotland) Alec Cheyne (1949–1955)
- (Scotland) Tommy Gray (1955–1957)
- (Scotland) Chris Anderson (1957–1960)
- (Scotland) John Prentice (1960–1962)
- (Scotland) Bert Henderson (1962–1980)
- (Scotland) Ian Stewart (1980–82)
- (Scotland) George Fleming (1982–1985)
- (Scotland) Jimmy Bone (1985–1987)
- (Scotland) John Young (1987–1990)
- (Scotland) Ian Gibson (1990–1991)
- (Scotland) Walter Borthwick (1991)
- (Scotland) Mickey Lawson (1991–1992)
- (Scotland) Danny McGrain (1992–1994)
- (Scotland) Jocky Scott (1994)
- (Scotland) George Mackie (1994–1995) with (Scotland) Donald Park (1994)
- (Scotland) John Brogan (1995–1996)
- (Scotland) Tommy Campbell (1996–1997)
- (Scotland) David Baikie (1997–2000)
- (Scotland) John Brownlie (2000–2003)
- (Scotland) Steve Kirk (2003–2004)
- (Scotland) Harry Cairney (2004–2005)
- (Scotland) John McGlashan (2005–2009)
- (Scotland) Jim Weir (2009–2010)
- (Scotland) Paul Sheerin (2010–2014)
- (Scotland) Allan Moore (2014–2015)
- (England) Todd Lumsden (2015–2016)
- (Scotland) Dick Campbell (2016–2023)
- (Scotland) Jim McIntyre (2023–2024)
- (Scotland) David Gold and (Scotland) Colin Hamilton (2024–)

== Honours ==
=== League ===
Level 2 (Scottish Division Two, Scottish B Division, Scottish First Division, Scottish Championship): Runners-up: 1934–35, 1958–59, 1967–68, 1971–72, 2021–22

Level 3 (Scottish Division Three, Scottish C Division, Scottish Second Division, Scottish League One): Winners: 2018–19, 2024–25 Runners-up: 2000–01, 2011–12

Level 4 (Scottish Third Division, Scottish League Two): Winners 2010–11, 2016–17 Runners-up: 1997–98, 2006–07 Play-off winners 2007–08

=== National cup competitions ===
Scottish Cup Semi-finalists: 1946–47

Scottish League Cup Semi-finalists: 1959–60

Scottish Youth Cup Semi-finalists: 2001–02

Scottish Challenge Cup Semi-finalists: 2012–13

Scottish Qualifying Cup: Winners 1903 Runners-up: 1899, 1912

=== Minor ===
Reserve League Cup 2003, Combined Reserve League 1964, Northern League 1891–92, Forfarshire County League (joint) 1908–09, Dewar Shield 1937–38

Arbroath were the first winners of the Forfarshire Cup in 1883 and have won the trophy 17 times since then. Winners in 1883–84, 1887–88, 1889–90, 1892–93, 1895–96, 1896–97, 1906–07, 1913–14, 1920–21, 1923–24, 1933–34, 1935–36, 1938–39, 1939–40, 1957–58, 1993–94, 1995–96

== Club records ==
- Biggest win: 36–0 vs Bon Accord, 12 September 1885, Scottish Cup (World record)
- Biggest defeat: 1–9 vs Celtic, 25 August 1993, League Cup
- Highest home attendance: 13,510 vs Rangers, 23 February 1952, Scottish Cup
- Highest average home attendance: 4,780, 1959–60 season (17 games)
- Most capped player: Ned Doig, 5 (2 whilst with Arbroath), Scotland
- Most league appearances: 426, Tom Cargill, 1966–80
- Most league goals in a season by a player: 45, David Easson, 1958–59
