= List of Scottish Professional Football League clubs =

The Scottish Professional Football League (SPFL) is an association football league in Scotland. It comprises the top four divisions of the Scottish football league system. The league was established in 2013, following a merger of the Scottish Premier League (SPL; tier one) and the Scottish Football League (SFL; tiers two to four). The Scottish Premier League itself had been formed in 1998 as a breakaway from the Scottish Football League, which had been established in 1890.

== Clubs ==
=== Current members of the Scottish Professional Football League ===
Club	First SFL season	First SPFL season	Division	2025–26 position	Refs.
Aberdeen	1904–05	2013–14	Premiership	Premiership, 9th	
Airdrieonians (Note: A previous club known as Airdrieonians played in the Scottish Football League between 1894 and 2002. The name was revived in 2013 when Airdrie United were renamed. The present Airdrieonians club is formally a continuation of Clydebank, who relocated in 2002 to the stadium of the defunct Airdrieonians and were renamed "Airdrie United" at that time.)	2002–03	2013–14	Championship	Championship, 9th	
Alloa Athletic	1921–22	2013–14	League One	League One, 4th	
Annan Athletic	2008–09	2013–14	League Two	League Two, 7th	
Arbroath	1921–22	2013–14	Championship	League One, 1st	
Ayr United	1910–11	2013–14	Championship	Championship, 7th	
Celtic	1890–91	2013–14	Premiership	Premiership, 1st	
Clyde	1891–92	2013–14	League Two	League Two, 3rd	
Cove Rangers	—	2019–20	League One	League One, 7th	
Dumbarton	1890–91	2013–14	League Two	League Two, 9th	
Dundee	1893–94	2013–14	Premiership	Premiership, 8th	
Dundee United	1910–11	2013–14	Premiership	Premiership, 7th	
Dunfermline Athletic	1912–13	2013–14	Championship	Championship, 4th	
East Fife	1921–22	2013–14	League One	League One, 8th	
East Kilbride	—	2025–26	League Two	League Two, 1st	
Edinburgh City (Note: The club was known as "F.C. Edinburgh" during the 2022–23 season. A previous club known as Edinburgh City played in the Scottish Football League between 1931 and 1949. That name was revived in 1986 when Postal United were renamed.)	—	2016–17	League Two	League Two, 10th	
Elgin City	2000–01	2013–14	League Two	League Two, 6th	
Falkirk	1902–03	2013–14	Premiership	Championship, 1st	
Forfar Athletic	1921–22	2013–14	League Two	League Two, 4th	
Greenock Morton	1893–94	2013–14	Championship	Championship, 8th	
Hamilton Academical	1897–98	2013–14	League One	League One, 9th	
Heart of Midlothian	1890–91	2013–14	Premiership	Premiership, 2nd	
Hibernian	1893–94	2013–14	Premiership	Premiership, 5th	
Inverness Caledonian Thistle (Note: Formed from merger of Caledonian and Inverness Thistle in 1994. Changed name from Caledonian Thistle to Inverness Caledonian Thistle in 1996.)	1994–95	2013–14	League One	League One, 1st	
Kelty Hearts	—	2021–22	League One	League One, 10th	
Kilmarnock	1895–96	2013–14	Premiership	Premiership, 10th	
Livingston (Note: Changed name from Meadowbank Thistle to Livingston in 1995.)	1974–75	2013–14	Premiership	Premiership, 12th	
Montrose	1923–24	2013–14	League One	League One, 6th	
Motherwell	1893–94	2013–14	Premiership	Premiership, 4th	
Partick Thistle	1893–94	2013–14	Championship	Championship, 2nd	
Peterhead	2000–01	2013–14	League One	League One, 5th	
Queen of the South	1923–24	2013–14	League One	League One, 3rd	
Queen's Park	1900–01	2013–14	Championship	Championship, 6th	
Raith Rovers	1902–03	2013–14	Championship	Championship, 5th	
Rangers	1890–91	2013–14	Premiership	Premiership, 3rd	
Ross County	1994–95	2013–14	Championship	Championship, 10th	
St Johnstone	1911–12	2013–14	Championship	Championship, 1st	
St Mirren	1890–91	2013–14	Premiership	Premiership, 11th	
Stenhousemuir	1921–22	2013–14	League One	League One, 2nd	
Stirling Albion	1946–47	2013–14	League Two	League Two, 8th	
Stranraer	1949–50	2013–14	League Two	League Two, 5th	
The Spartans	—	2023–24	League Two	League Two, 2nd	

=== Former member clubs ===
Club	First SFL season	First SPFL season	Last SPFL season	Relegated from SPFL in	Now play in	Refs.
Albion Rovers	1903–04	2013–14	2022–23	2023	Lowland League West	
Berwick Rangers	1951–52	2013–14	2018–19	2019	Lowland League East	
Bonnyrigg Rose (Note: The club was known as "Bonnyrigg Rose Athletic" until 2022.)	—	2022–23	2024–25	2025	Lowland League East	
Brechin City	1923–24	2013–14	2020–21	2021	Lowland League East	
Cowdenbeath	1905–06	2013–14	2021–22	2022	Lowland League East	
East Stirlingshire	1900–01	2013–14	2015–16	2016	Lowland League East	

== See also ==
- List of Scottish Football League clubs
- List of Scottish Premier League clubs
- Timeline of Scottish football
