= List of Scottish Football League clubs =

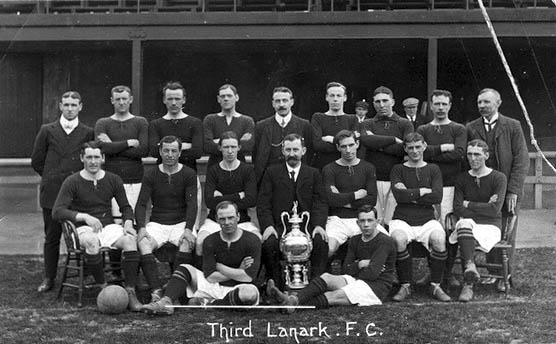
Third Lanark enjoyed great success in the early days of Scottish football but disbanded in the 1960s.

The Scottish Football League ("SFL") was established in 1890, initially as an amateur league as professionalism had not been legalised in Scottish football. In 1893 a Second Division was formed, with the existing single division renamed the First Division. The Second Division was discontinued during the First World War but revived in 1921. A Third Division was added in 1923 but collapsed three years later as a number of its member clubs found themselves unable to complete their fixtures for financial reasons, with many folding altogether. After the Second World War the divisions were rebranded as Division A and Division B and a Division C was added. This included a mixture of new member clubs and the reserve teams of clubs from the higher divisions, but this division was dropped in 1955.

A major re-organisation of the SFL in 1975 led to the existing two divisions being split into three smaller divisions, with a new Premier Division at the highest level. This structure remained in place until 1998, when the teams then in the Premier Division broke away to form the Scottish Premier League, which supplanted the Premier Division as the highest level of football in Scotland. In 2013 the two leagues merged to form the new Scottish Professional Football League, ending the 123-year existence of the SFL.

For the whole history of the SFL, there was no mechanism in place for club(s) at the bottom of the league to be relegated. A number of clubs who resigned or were expelled from the SFL went on to play in non-league football, either in senior leagues such as the East of Scotland Football League or in leagues governed by the Scottish Junior Football Association (SJFA). Whenever a club left the league (for example, when Gretna was liquidated in 2008), a new club was elected in its place. This closed-shop system was changed soon after the leagues merged, when a play-off between the bottom-placed SPFL club and the winner of a play-off between the Highland League and Lowland League champions was introduced in 2015. Edinburgh City became the first club to be promoted to the SPFL when they won a playoff against East Stirlingshire in 2016.

== Clubs ==
The tables show the first and last seasons in which each club competed in the league. Some clubs' membership was intermittent between their first and last seasons. Clubs shown in bold were among the founder members of the league. Where a former club has become defunct, any phoenix club formed as a successor side is noted.

=== Former member clubs currently playing in the SPFL ===
Club	First SFL season	Last SFL season	Notes
Aberdeen	1904–05	1997–98	
Airdrieonians (Note: Formally a continuation of Clydebank, who relocated to Airdrie in 2002 and were renamed Airdrie United. The name was changed in 2013 to Airdrieonians, the same name as the original Airdrieonians club that was liquidated in 2002.)	2002–03	2012–13	
Albion Rovers	1903–04	2012–13	
Alloa Athletic	1921–22	2012–13	
Annan Athletic	2008–09	2012–13	
Arbroath	1921–22	2012–13	
Ayr United	1910–11	2012–13	
**Celtic**	1890–91	1997–98	
Clyde	1891–92	2012–13	
Cowdenbeath	1905–06	2012–13	
**Dumbarton**	1890–91	2012–13	
Dundee	1893–94	2011–12	
Dundee United	1910–11	1997–98	
Dunfermline Athletic	1912–13	2012–13	
East Fife	1921–22	2012–13	
Elgin City	2000–01	2012–13	
Falkirk	1902–03	2012–13	
Forfar Athletic	1921–22	2012–13	
Hamilton Academical	1897–98	2012–13	
**Heart of Midlothian**	1890–91	1997–98	
Hibernian	1893–94	1998–99	
Inverness Caledonian Thistle	1994–95	2009–10	
Kilmarnock	1895–96	1997–98	
Livingston	1995–96	2012–13	
Montrose	1923–24	2012–13	
Morton	1893–94	2012–13	
Motherwell	1893–94	1997–98	
Partick Thistle	1893–94	2012–13	
Peterhead	2000–01	2012–13	
Queen of the South	1923–24	2012–13	
Queen's Park	1900–01	2012–13	
Raith Rovers	1902–03	2012–13	
**Rangers**	1890–91	2012–13	
Ross County	1994–95	2011–12	
St Johnstone	1897–98	2008–09	
**St Mirren**	1890–91	2005–06	
Stenhousemuir	1921–22	2012–13	
Stirling Albion	1946–47	2012–13	
Stranraer	1949–50	2012–13	

=== Other former member clubs ===
Club	First SFL season	Last SFL season	Current status	Notes
**Abercorn**	1890–91	1914–15	Defunct effectively from 1920 due to being unable to secure a new ground, officially in 1922 (an annual club dinner however was held until 1939).	
Airdrieonians	1894–95	2001–02	Officially defunct, but former owners took over the Clydebank club and renamed it as Airdrie United, before re-adopting the name Airdrieonians in 2013.	
Armadale	1921–22	1931–32	Defunct, reconstituted as Armadale Thistle currently playing in the East of Scotland League First Division	
Arthurlie	1901–02	1928–29	Reformed in 1931, currently competing in the West of Scotland League Premier Division	
Ayr	1897–98	1909–10	Merged with Ayr Parkhouse to form Ayr United	
Ayr Parkhouse	1902–03	1909–10	Merged with Ayr to form Ayr United	
Bathgate	1921–22	1928–29 (Note: Bathgate resigned during the 1928–29 season and the club's record was expunged from the table.)	Defunct	
Beith	1923–24	1925–26	Reformed as Beith Juniors and currently competing in the West of Scotland League Premier Division	
Berwick Rangers	1951–52	2012–13	Playing in the Lowland League	
Bo'ness	1921–22	1931–32	Merged with Bo'ness Cadora to form Bo'ness United and currently competing in the Lowland League	
Brechin City	1923–24	2012–13	Playing in Highland Football League	
Broxburn United	1921–22	1925–26	Defunct	
**Cambuslang**	1890–91	1891–92	Defunct	
Clackmannan	1921–22	1925–26	Defunct	
Clydebank (original club)	1914–15	1930–31	Defunct	
Clydebank (second club)	1965–66	2001–02	Taken over by the former owners of the defunct Airdrieonians, who renamed the club as Airdrie United whilst selling the rights to the name Clydebank FC to that side's supporters club, which currently competes in the Lowland League	
**Cowlairs**	1890–91	1894–95	Defunct	
Dumbarton Harp	1923–24	1924–25	Defunct - although amateur side continues	
Dundee Wanderers	1894–95	1894–95	Defunct	
Dykehead	1923–24	1925–26	Defunct	
East Stirlingshire	1900–01	2012–13	Playing in the Lowland League	
Edinburgh City	1931–32	1948–49	Defunct. The name was revived in 1986 when Postal United were renamed Edinburgh City; this club gained promotion from the Lowland League to the SPFL in 2016	
Galston	1923–24	1925–26	Defunct	
Gretna	2002–03	2006–07 (Note: Gretna officially returned to the Scottish League upon being relegated from the Scottish Premier League at the conclusion of the 2007–08 season, but resigned from the league before the start of the subsequent season.)	Defunct, though a 'new' club set up by its supporters, Gretna 2008, play in the Lowland League at the same ground	
Helensburgh	1923–24	1925–26	Defunct	
Johnstone	1912–13	1925–26	Defunct	
King's Park	1921–22	1938–39	Technically defunct - but see Stirling Albion	
Leith Athletic	1891–92	1952–53	Defunct - revived version of the club currently competing in the East of Scotland League First Division	
Linthouse	1895–96	1899–1900	Defunct	
Lochgelly United	1914–15	1925–26	Defunct	
Meadowbank Thistle	1974–75	1994–95	Relocated and became Livingston. The current club considers its founding date to be 1995.	
Mid-Annandale	1923–24	1925–26	Defunct, revived version of the club currently competing in the South of Scotland League	
Nithsdale Wanderers	1923–24	1926–27	Defunct, revived version of the club currently competing in the South of Scotland League	
Northern	1893–94	1893–94	Defunct	
Peebles Rovers	1923–24	1925–26	Competing in the East of Scotland League Second Division	
Port Glasgow Athletic	1893–94	1910–11	Officially defunct, however the current Port Glasgow Juniors celebrated their "centenary" in 1993.	
**Renton**	1890–91	1897–98	Defunct in 1922. Resurrected several times, most recently in 2008	
Royal Albert	1923–24	1925–26	Reformed in 1928, currently competing in the West of Scotland League Fourth Division	
Solway Star	1923–24	1925–26	Defunct	
St Bernard's	1893–94	1938–39	Defunct, revived version of the club joined local Edinburgh & District Amateur League	
**Third Lanark**	1890–91	1966–67	Defunct 1967, however amateur side has continued haphazardly in Glasgow amateur leagues	
Thistle	1893–94	1893–94	Defunct	
**Vale of Leven**	1890–91	1925–26	Reformed in 1939, currently competing in the West of Scotland League Fourth Division	

== See also ==
- List of Scottish Professional Football League clubs
- Timeline of Scottish football
