= Celtic F.C. league record by opponent =

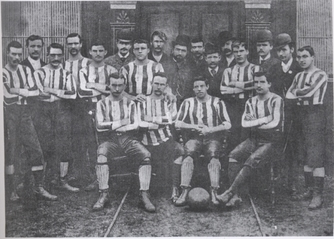
An early team photo of Celtic, before the adoption of the now-famous hooped jerseys.

Celtic Football Club is a professional association football club based Glasgow, Scotland. The club was founded in 1887 and began playing league football in 1890 as founder members of the Scottish Football League. Since their first season Celtic have remained in the top division of the Scottish football league system: the Scottish Football League (1890–93), Scottish Football League Division One (1893–1975), Scottish Football League Premier Division (1975–98), Scottish Premier League (1998–2013) and Scottish Premiership (2013–present). As of 2022–23 the club has completed 134 seasons of competitive football and have been Scottish football champions 54 times.

Celtic played their inaugural league fixture as part of the 1890–91 Scottish Football League on 23 August 1890 against Heart of Midlothian. Since that game they have faced 45 different sides in league football with their most regular opponent having been their Old Firm rivals Rangers, whom they have played on 330 occasions since their first league meeting on 21 March 1891. They met their most recent different league opponent, Ross County, for the first time in the 2012–13 Scottish Premier League season. The club has won 180 of the league matches against Motherwell which represents the most Celtic have won against any club. They have drawn more matches with Rangers than with any other club with 90 of their meetings finishing without a winner. Rangers are also the side that has defeated Celtic in more league games than any other club, having won 127 of their encounters.

== Key ==
- The table includes results of matches played by Celtic in the Scottish Football League, Scottish First Division, Scottish Premier League and Scottish Premiership.
- † Teams with this background and symbol in the "Club" column are competing in the 2023–24 Scottish Premiership alongside Celtic.
- ‡ Clubs with this background and symbol in the "Club" column are defunct
- Pld = matches played; W = matches won; D = matches drawn; L = matches lost; GF = goals for; GA = goals against; Win% = percentage of total matches won
- The columns headed "First" and "Last" contain the first and most recent seasons in which Celtic played league matches against each opponent

== All-time league record ==
Statistics correct as of match played on 16 December 2023.

Celtic F.C. league record by opponent
Club	Home				Away				Total						Win%	First	Last
Club	Pld	W	D	L	Pld	W	D	L	Pld	W	D	L	GF	GA	Win%	First	Last
Abercorn ‡	4	4	0	0	4	3	0	1	8	7	0	1	31	10	87.50	1890–91	1896–97
Aberdeen †	155	106	26	23	153	69	38	46	308	175	64	69	584	331	56.82	1905–06	2023–24
Airdrieonians ‡	64	47	12	5	64	41	10	13	128	88	22	18	311	118	68.75	1903–04	1992–93
Albion Rovers	9	7	1	1	9	7	1	1	18	14	2	2	56	15	77.78	1919–20	1948–49
Alloa Athletic	1	1	0	0	1	1	0	0	2	2	0	0	4	2	100.00	1922–23	1922–23
Arbroath	9	9	0	0	9	7	1	1	18	16	1	1	56	10	88.89	1935–36	1974–75
Ayr United	38	32	2	4	38	27	4	7	76	59	6	11	211	72	77.63	1913–14	1977–78
Bo'ness ‡	1	1	0	0	1	1	0	0	2	2	0	0	5	1	100.00	1927–28	1927–28
Cambuslang ‡	2	2	0	0	2	1	0	1	4	3	0	1	13	6	75.00	1890–91	1891–92
Clyde	63	48	10	5	63	46	13	4	126	94	23	9	360	107	74.60	1891–92	1974–75
Clydebank (1914–1931) ‡	7	4	2	1	7	5	1	1	14	9	3	2	28	10	64.29	1917–18	1925–26
Clydebank (1965–2002) ‡	6	6	0	0	6	3	2	1	12	9	2	1	31	7	75.00	1977–78	1986–87
Cowdenbeath	11	10	1	0	11	7	2	2	22	17	3	2	62	15	77.27	1924–25	1970–71
Cowlairs ‡	1	1	0	0	1	1	0	0	2	2	0	0	7	0	100.00	1890–91	1890–91
Dumbarton	20	15	5	0	20	16	3	1	40	31	8	1	113	25	77.50	1890–91	1984–85
Dundee †	123	87	24	12	119	63	25	31	242	150	49	43	505	239	61.98	1893–94	2023–24
Dundee United	100	64	28	8	101	53	21	27	201	117	49	35	410	200	58.21	1925–26	2022–23
Dunfermline Athletic	52	45	1	6	49	30	11	8	101	75	12	14	258	95	74.26	1926–27	2011–12
East Fife	14	10	3	1	14	5	1	8	28	15	4	9	75	48	53.57	1930–31	1973–74
East Stirlingshire	2	2	0	0	2	2	0	0	4	4	0	0	16	4	100.00	1932–33	1963–64
Falkirk	76	59	10	7	77	41	19	17	153	100	29	24	340	148	65.36	1905–06	2009–10
Gretna ‡	1	1	0	0	2	2	0	0	3	3	0	0	8	1	100.00	2007–08	2007–08
Hamilton Academical	56	49	3	4	54	38	11	5	110	87	14	9	278	92	79.09	1906–07	2020–21
Heart of Midlothian †	162	105	37	20	160	75	31	54	322	180	68	74	613	350	55.90	1890–91	2023–24
Hibernian †	152	101	33	18	154	75	43	36	306	176	76	54	633	304	57.52	1895–96	2023–24
Inverness Caledonian Thistle	20	17	2	1	19	11	5	3	39	28	7	4	92	30	71.79	2004–05	2016–17
Kilmarnock †	118	94	18	6	123	69	30	24	241	163	48	30	583	219	67.63	1899–1900	2023–24
Leith Athletic	6	6	0	0	6	4	0	2	12	10	0	2	37	14	83.33	1891–92	1931–32
Livingston †	17	14	3	0	16	10	4	2	33	24	7	2	82	23	72.73	2001–02	2023–24
Morton	61	44	12	5	61	39	14	8	122	83	26	13	275	98	68.03	1900–01	1987–88
Motherwell †	146	104	23	19	145	77	38	30	291	181	61	49	642	298	62.20	1903–04	2023–24
Partick Thistle	97	67	17	13	101	68	18	15	198	135	35	28	458	187	68.18	1897–98	2017–18
Port Glasgow Athletic ‡	8	7	0	1	8	6	2	0	16	13	2	1	45	11	81.25	1902–03	1909–10
Queen of the South	20	10	5	5	20	7	3	10	40	17	8	15	86	60	42.50	1933–34	1963–64
Queen's Park	42	34	5	3	42	31	2	9	84	65	7	12	220	75	77.38	1900–01	1957–58
Raith Rovers	40	28	7	5	40	22	9	9	80	50	16	14	178	70	62.50	1910–11	1996–97
Rangers †	165	72	47	46	166	42	43	81	331	114	90	127	447	466	34.44	1890–91	2023–24
Renton ‡	3	3	0	0	3	3	0	0	6	6	0	0	19	5	100.00	1891–92	1892–93
Ross County †	17	14	3	0	18	13	3	2	35	27	6	2	91	19	77.14	2012–13	2023–24
St Bernard's ‡	7	7	0	0	7	5	1	1	14	12	1	1	37	14	85.71	1893–94	1899–1900
St Johnstone †	73	54	14	5	73	45	12	16	146	99	26	21	346	121	67.81	1924–25	2023–24
St Mirren †	126	93	22	11	125	84	20	21	251	177	42	32	595	212	70.52	1891–92	2023–24
Stirling Albion	11	10	1	0	11	4	2	5	22	14	3	5	64	23	63.64	1949–50	1967–68
Third Lanark ‡	58	42	8	8	58	31	13	14	116	73	21	22	270	132	62.93	1890–91	1964–65
Vale of Leven	2	2	0	0	2	0	1	1	4	2	1	1	18	7	50.00	1890–91	1891–92
