= Timeline of Scottish football =

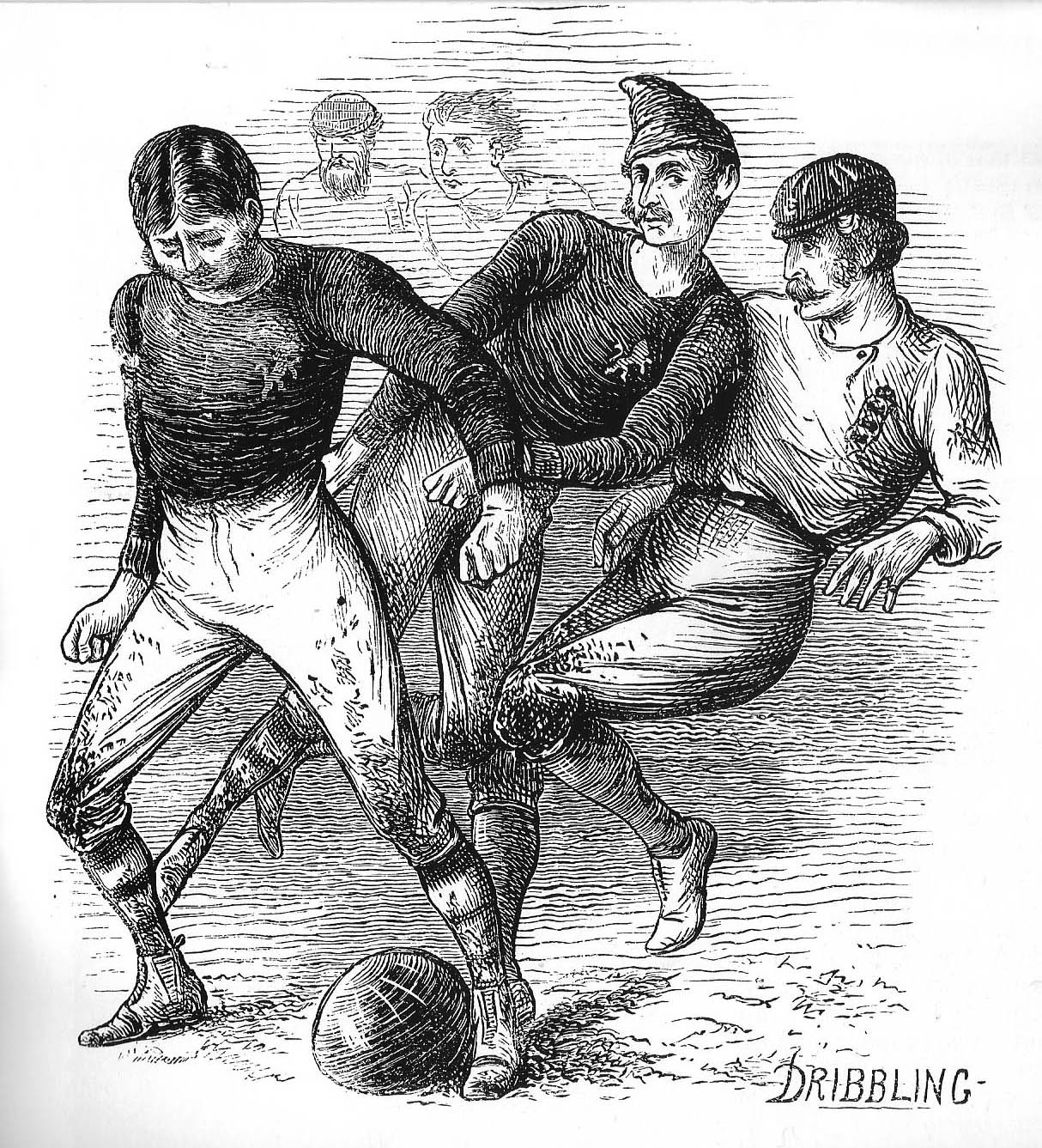
The first ever international football match was contested between Scotland and England.

Scotland was one of the earliest modern footballing nations, with Glasgow club Queen's Park early pioneers of the game throughout the UK. More clubs formed in Scotland, resulting in the commencement of the first major competition in 1873, the Scottish Cup, then the founding of the Scottish Football League in 1890. With the official sanctioning of professionalism, the Old Firm of Celtic and Rangers became dominant in Scotland, and remain so, although other clubs have enjoyed brief periods of success too.

The first officially recognized international football match took place between Scotland and England in 1872. Over time, Scotland began to play regularly against the other home nations too, and then on a yearly basis with the establishment of the British Home Championship in 1883. Scotland didn't compete against a nation from outside the British Isles until 1929 when they played Norway in Bergen, following which they began to contest regular friendly matches against other European sides. Scotland first competed in a major tournament when they qualified for the 1954 FIFA World Cup. They have qualified for a further seven World Cups since, although have exited at the group stage each time. Scotland have also qualified three times for the UEFA European Championships, in 1992, 1996 and the COVID-19 delayed 2020 tournament; failing to progress past the group stage each time.

The Scottish Football Association (SFA) were prominent in the administration of football since the early days of the game, and in 1882 agreed with the other home-nation associations on a uniform set of rules. They continue to play a role in this, with the SFA currently forming part of the International Football Association Board along with each of the other home-nation associations and four representatives from FIFA.

== History ==
The game started to become popular in Scotland following the development in London in 1863 of the first ever rules of association football, established by The Football Association. Scottish football clubs started to be formed towards the end of the 1860s and 1870s, notably Queen's Park who were early pioneers of the game throughout the UK. The first officially recognised international football match took place in 1872 between Scotland and England at the West of Scotland Cricket Club's ground in Glasgow. The Scottish Football Association was formed in 1873, and the first official competition in Scotland commenced that same year, the Scottish Cup. The game in Scotland progressed further with the founding of the Scottish Football League in 1890, and the official sanctioning of professionalism in 1893.

Queens Park's insistence on remaining amateur saw their early prominence in Scottish football fade, and the Old Firm of Celtic and Rangers became the dominant clubs. Celtic won six successive league titles during the first decade of the 20th century, during which time they also became the first club to win the league and Scottish Cup in the same season (the "double"). They also won four successive titles the following decade. In the inter-war years, Rangers won 14 of the 20 league titles competed for, and a few years after the end of the Second World War were the first club to win all three major domestic competitions in the same season in Scotland (the "treble"). Both Old Firm clubs have since won nine successive league titles; Celtic from 1966 to 1974 and then again from 2012 to 2020, and Rangers from 1989 to 1997. Rangers have won the league championship a total of 55 times, a joint world record. Other clubs have enjoyed brief periods of success: Heart of Midlothian and Hibernian during the late 1940s and 1950s and Aberdeen, and to a lesser extent Dundee United, in the early 1980s.

Following the first international in 1872 between Scotland and England, over the next 50 years the national side played exclusively against the other three Home Nations – England, Wales and Ireland. The British Home Championship was established in 1883, making these games competitive. Scotland won the first ever championship, and won outright on ten occasions up to the First World War and shared the title on a further 6 times with at least one other team. Scotland played their first match outside the British Isles in 1929, beating Norway 7–3 in Bergen. Scotland then contested regular friendly matches against European opposition and enjoyed wins against Germany and France before losing to the Austrian "Wunderteam" and Italy in 1931.

Scotland took part in their first major international tournament when they qualified for the 1954 FIFA World Cup in Switzerland, and then again in 1958 for the World Cup in Sweden, failing to progress from the first round in both tournaments. After a barren spell in the 1960s, Scotland qualified for the 1974 FIFA World Cup in West Germany, where the team was unbeaten but failed to progress due to inferior goal difference. The national side also qualified for the 1978 FIFA World Cup in Argentina, amidst unprecedented publicity and optimism. They failed to win either of their first two games, and a win over the Netherlands wasn't enough to prevent another first round exit. The national side qualified for the next three World Cups in 1982, 1986 and 1990, but also exited at the first round in each. Scotland qualified for the finals of UEFA European Championship for the first time in 1992, and repeated the feat for the 1996 Euros in England. A further major tournament was reached when they took part in the 1998 FIFA World Cup in France, but then went over 20 years without qualifying for a major tournament. Scotland finally ended this barren run when they qualified for the COVID-19 delayed Euro 2020 tournament.

The Scottish Football Association (SFA) were prominent in the administration of football since the early days of the game. In 1882 they met up with other home-nation associations and agreed on a uniform set of rules for football. The home-nation associations went on to form the International Football Association Board (IFAB) to approve any changes to the rules. It was a proposal by the SFA that led to the offside rule being changed in 1925, where a player would now be onside if a minimum of two (instead of three) opposing players are between him and the goal line. IFAB continues to meet twice a year, once to decide on possible changes to the rules governing football and once to deliberate on its internal affairs. The organisation is now made up of representatives from the SFA, the other three home-nation associations, and the Fédération Internationale de Football Association (FIFA). Each home-nation association has one vote and FIFA has four. IFAB deliberations must be approved by three-quarters of the vote, which translates to at least six votes. Thus, FIFA's approval is necessary for any IFAB decision, but FIFA alone cannot change the Laws of the Game – they need to be agreed by at least two of the home-nation members. As of 2016, all members must be present for a binding vote to proceed.

== Pre-1860 ==
=== 1824 ===
- The first documented club in the world dedicated to football, Foot-Ball Club, is formed in Edinburgh.

== 1860s ==
=== 1867 ===
- Scotland's oldest club in continuous existence and longest established club Queen's Park is formed.
- Queen's Park compile "The Rules of the Field", a set of rules based on the common Association rules of the time, but with notable changes to the offside rule.

=== 1868 ===
- Queen's Park play their first match against another club, the newly formed Glasgow-based team Thistle.

== 1870s ==
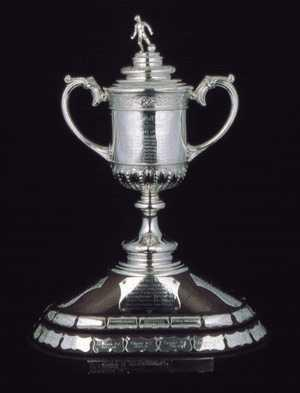
The Scottish Cup trophy is the oldest trophy in association football.

=== 1870 ===
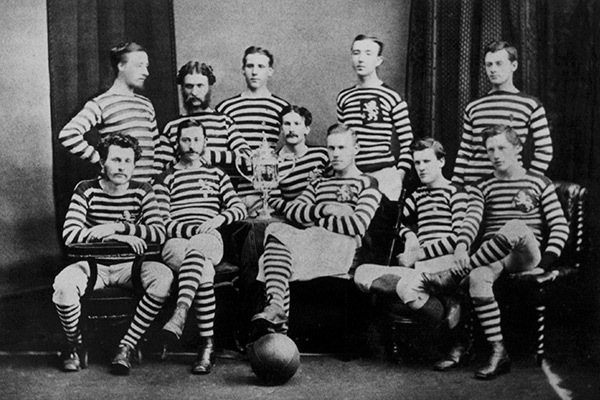
The Queen's Park team of 1874. The club were early pioneers of association football throughout the UK.

- The first representative match is played between England and Scotland, although this is not considered to be an official international match.
- In the absence of an organising body for football in Scotland, Queen's Park join the English Football Association.

=== 1872 ===
- Queen's Park become the first ever Scottish football team to participate in official competition when they play in the 1871–72 FA Cup semi-final against Wanderers, the match ends goalless. Queen's, however, can not afford to extend their stay long enough for the tie to be replayed and are forced to withdraw.
- Rangers are formed in March. In May, Rangers play their first ever match, a friendly against Callander, drawing 0-0, played at Fleshers' Haugh (now known as Glasgow Green).
- Scotland and England draw 0–0, played at the West of Scotland Cricket Club. This is recognised by FIFA as the first official international match.

=== 1873 ===
- The Scottish Football Association (SFA) is formed.
- The first Scottish Cup competition begins.

=== 1874 ===
- Queen's Park defeat Clydesdale 2–0 to win the inaugural Scottish Cup.

=== 1876 ===
- Scotland defeat Wales 4–0 in the first international between the two countries.

=== 1877 ===
- Vale of Leven win the Scottish Cup for the first time after beating Rangers 3–2 in a second replay – thereby becoming the first team other than Queen's Park to win the trophy.

== 1880s ==
=== 1881 ===
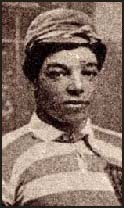
Andrew Watson is widely considered to be the first black person to play football at international level.

- Dr. John Smith becomes the first player to score a hat-trick in a Scottish Cup Final, netting all three of Queen's Park's goals in a 3–1 win over Dumbarton. The final is a replay after the first match was won 2–1 by Queen's Park but declared void due to a protest from Dumbarton.
- Andrew Watson wins his first cap for Scotland, becoming what is widely considered to be the world's first black person to play football at international level.
- The first known women's match to be played under football association rules takes place at Easter Road. A team representing Scotland beat England 3–0, with Lily St Clare becoming the first ever recorded female goalscorer.

=== 1882 ===
- The Scottish Football Association, the Football Association (England), the Football Association of Wales and the Irish Football Association meet on 6 December and agree on one uniform set of rules for football. They also establish the International Football Association Board (IFAB) to approve changes to the rules (a task that they still perform to this day).

=== 1883 ===
- Dumbarton win the Scottish Cup for the first time, defeating Vale of Leven 2–1 in the 1883 Scottish Cup Final.

=== 1884 ===
- The British Home Championship (also known as the Home International Championship) becomes an annual competition contested between the UK's four national teams, Scotland, England, Wales and Ireland. Scotland go on to win the first championship after winning all three of their matches.
- Scotland defeat Ireland 5–0 in Belfast in the first international between the two countries.
- Queen's Park reach the 1884 FA Cup Final, but lose 2–1 against Blackburn Rovers.

=== 1885 ===
- Renton win the Scottish Cup for the first time, defeating Vale of Leven 3–1 in the 1885 Scottish Cup Final.
- Arbroath defeat Bon Accord 36–0 in the first round of the Scottish Cup, a record scoreline in a major competition in British football. Jock Petrie scores 13 goals in the game, the highest number of goals by a player in a single game in competitive British football. This scoreline narrowly beats out another Scottish Cup match on the same day where Dundee Harp beat Aberdeen Rovers 35–0, with the referee noting a 37–0 win, but accepting the lower tally from a Dundee Harp secretary after acknowledging he may have miscounted.

=== 1886 ===
- The Scottish Junior Football Association is formed. The term "junior" refers to the level of football played, not the age of the players.
- The first Scottish Junior Cup competition begins.

=== 1887 ===
- Hibernian win the Scottish Cup for the first time, defeating Dumbarton 2–1 in the 1887 Scottish Cup Final.
- The SFA instructs all its member clubs to withdraw from the FA Cup and to cease any further participation in that competition.
- Fairfield Govan defeat Edinburgh Woodburn 3–1 in the first Scottish Junior Cup final.

=== 1888 ===
- Renton defeat West Bromwich Albion 4–1 in a challenge match between the holders of the FA Cup and Scottish Cup. The winners are declared "Champions of the United Kingdom and the World".
- Celtic play their first ever match, a friendly against Rangers, winning 5–2.

=== 1889 ===
- Third Lanark win the Scottish Cup for the first time, defeating Celtic 2–1 in the 1889 Scottish Cup Final.

== 1890s ==
=== 1890 ===
- The Scottish Football League is formed.

=== 1891 ===
- Dumbarton and Rangers share the inaugural Scottish league championship after both finish with 29 points and a play-off match is drawn. Had either Goal Difference or Goal Average been applied at that time, Dumbarton F.C. would have been sole League Champions.
- Heart of Midlothian win the Scottish Cup for the first time after beating Dumbarton 1–0 in the final.

=== 1892 ===
- Celtic win the Scottish Cup for the first time after beating Queen's Park 5–1 in a replayed final. Dumbarton F.C. become first outright winners and champions of the Scottish League in the 1891-92 season.

=== 1893 ===
- Celtic win the league title for the first time.
- Professionalism is formally approved by the SFA.
- The Highland Football League is founded.

=== 1894 ===
- Rangers win the Scottish Cup for the first time, defeating Celtic 3–1 in the first cup final between the two teams who would become known as the Old Firm.
- Celtic build the first ever press box at a football stadium in Britain, located high up on the main stand at Celtic Park.

=== 1895 ===
- Heart of Midlothian win the league title for the first time.
- St Bernard's win the Scottish Cup for the first time, defeating Renton 2–1 in the final.

=== 1896 ===
- The Scotland national team decides to select England-based players for the first time to improve their chances of winning the 1895–96 British Home Championship fixture against England, holding a selection trial between their 'Home' and 'Anglo' players Scotland win the match and the championship, and the trial becomes an annual event for the next 30 years.
- Hearts defeat Hibernian in the first Edinburgh derby Scottish Cup final, and the only one to be held outside Glasgow.

=== 1899 ===
- Rangers win the league title after winning all 18 of their league matches for a perfect season.

== 1900s ==
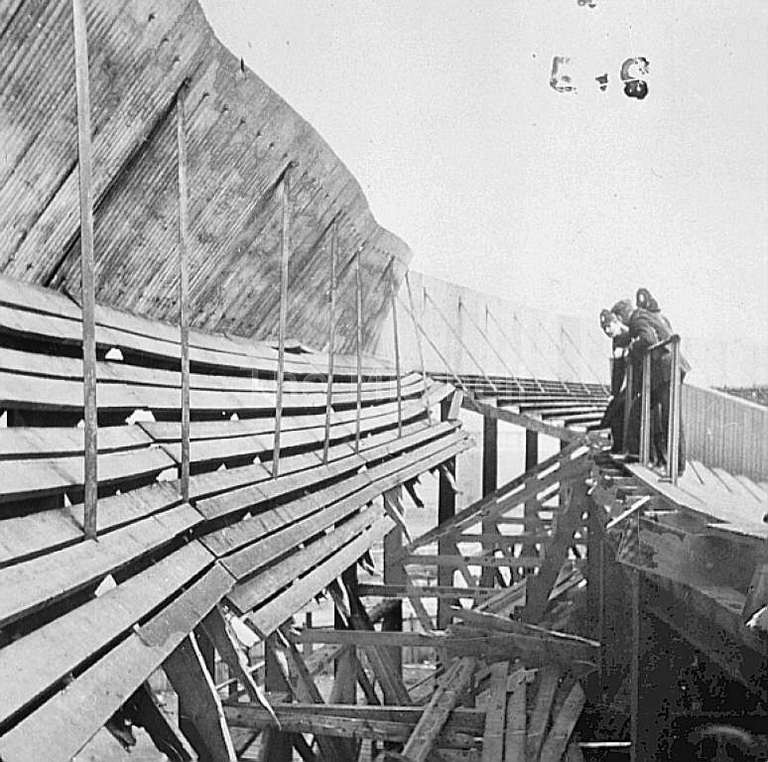
The damage caused at Ibrox Park by the 1902 disaster, which resulted in the deaths of 25 people

=== 1902 ===
- 25 people are killed and 517 are injured after a stand collapses at Ibrox Park during a British Home Championship match between Scotland and England.

=== 1903 ===
- Hibernian win the league title for the first time.

=== 1904 ===
- Third Lanark win the league title for the first time.
- Jimmy Quinn scores a hat-trick as Celtic win the 1904 Scottish Cup Final 3–2 against Rangers.

=== 1905 ===
- Celtic and Rangers finish the league level on 41 points, and a play-off at Hampden Park is arranged to decide the championship. Celtic win 2–1, clinching the first of what transpired to be six successive league titles.

=== 1907 ===
- Celtic win both the league title and the Scottish Cup in the same season, becoming the first club to win the double in Scotland.

=== 1909 ===
- The Scottish Cup is withheld by the SFA after a riot in the final replay between Celtic and Rangers.
- The Scottish Amateur Football Association (SAFA), the organising body for amateur football across Scotland, is formed.

== 1910s ==
=== 1910 ===
- Dundee win the Scottish Cup for the first time after beating Clyde 2–1 in the twice-replayed final.
- The SFA joins the Fédération Internationale de Football Association (FIFA), the international governing body for association football.

=== 1913 ===
- Falkirk beat Raith Rovers 2–0 in the final of the Scottish Cup to win the trophy for the first time.

=== 1914 ===
- Thirteen players from Heart of Midlothian sign-up en-masse with the McCrae's Battalion to fight in the First World War, in addition to their three players who had earlier enlisted in the services.

=== 1917 ===
- Celtic complete a 62 match unbeaten run, a record in British football that stood for over 100 years.

== 1920s ==
=== 1920 ===
- The SFA, along with the other three home-nation associations, withdraw from FIFA, primarily due to issues over playing ex-enemy countries from the First World War.

=== 1921 ===
- Goal average is brought in by the Scottish League to separate teams tied on the same number of points.

=== 1922 ===
- Morton win the Scottish Cup for the first time, defeating Rangers 1–0 in the final.
- Falkirk sign Syd Puddefoot from West Ham United for a transfer fee of £5,000 – a world record at the time.

=== 1924 ===
- Airdrieonians win the Scottish Cup for the first (and only) time, defeating Hibernian 2–0 in the final.
- The SFA and the three other home-nation associations rejoin FIFA.

=== 1925 ===
- Following a proposal by the SFA, the offside rule is changed: a player is now onside if a minimum of two (instead of three) opposing players are between him and the goal line.

=== 1926 ===
- St Mirren win the Scottish Cup for the first time, defeating Celtic 2–0 in the final.

=== 1928 ===
- Scotland defeat England 5–1 at Wembley, during which Alex Jackson scores the first ever hat-trick at Wembley. The Scotland team become popularly known as the Wembley Wizards.
- The SFA, along with the other three home-nation associations, once again withdraw from FIFA, due to the home nations reluctance to cede ultimate authority on football matters to FIFA.

=== 1929 ===
- Scotland play against opposition outside of England, Wales and Ireland for the first time, defeating Norway 7–3 in Bergen.

== 1930s ==
=== 1931 ===
- Celtic goalkeeper John Thomson dies after suffering a fractured skull after an accidental on-pitch collision with Rangers striker Sam English during a match at Ibrox Park. A reported 30,000 mourners attend his funeral in Fife.

=== 1932 ===
- Motherwell win the league title for the first time.
- Willie MacFadyen scores 52 league goals for Motherwell, a record goals total for a single season in Scottish League history.

=== 1934 ===
- Aberdeen's Pittodrie Stadium becomes the first football ground to feature a dugout, a sunken, sheltered area for note taking.

=== 1937 ===
- The Scotland v England match at Hampden Park is attended by 149,415, a European record.
- The 1937 Scottish Cup Final between Celtic and Aberdeen is attended by 147,365, a world record for a national cup final.
- Jimmy McGrory retires from playing football. He scored 550 goals in competitive matches for Celtic, Clydebank, Scotland and the Scottish League XI. He remains the highest goalscorer in British football.

=== 1939 ===
- Rangers defeat Celtic 2–1 in front of a crowd of 118,567 at Ibrox, a record attendance for a league match in Britain.
- Competitive football is suspended due to the outbreak of the Second World War in Europe, during the early stages of the 1939–40 season.

== 1940s ==
=== 1944 ===
- Scotland's 3–2 defeat at Hampden Park in the wartime international against England is watched by 133,000 fans, the largest attendance at any match in Britain during wartime.

=== 1946 ===
- Official competitive football resumes after the Second World War.
- The SFA, along with the other three home-nation associations, rejoin FIFA, paving the way for Scotland to play in World Cup matches.

=== 1947 ===
- Rangers win the first League Cup, as they defeat Aberdeen 4–0 at Hampden Park to win the 1946–47 competition.
- Hampden Park hosts a friendly match between a UK representative team and a Rest of the World XI. The game is dubbed "Match of the Century", with the UK winning 6–1 in front of 135,000 spectators. The gate receipts of £35,000 are donated to FIFA to help assist with the financial losses incurred as a result of the Second World War.
- East Fife are the second winners of the League Cup, after defeating Falkirk 4–1 in the replayed final of the 1947–48 competition.

=== 1948 ===
- The Great Britain Olympic football team, managed by Matt Busby, finish in fourth place at the 1948 Olympics football tournament in London. The squad includes five Scots, all from Queens Park (one of whom is goalkeeper Ronnie Simpson, who will go on to play in Celtic's 1967 European Cup Final winning team).

=== 1949 ===
- Rangers win the league title, League Cup and the Scottish Cup in season 1948–49, thereby becoming the first club to win the domestic treble in Scotland.

== 1950s ==
=== 1950 ===
- Scotland qualify for the 1950 FIFA World Cup by finishing second in the 1949–50 British Home Championship (which had doubled up as a qualifying group), but the SFA reject the offer of a place in the World Cup finals because they had not won the tournament.
- Motherwell win the League Cup for the first time after a 3–0 win over Hibernian in the final.

=== 1951 ===
- Dundee win the League Cup for the first time after defeating Rangers 3–2 in the final.
- Petershill beat Irvine Meadow in the Scottish Junior Cup final. The attendance of 77,650 is a record for the competition.
- Jamaican born Gil Heron signs for Celtic, and becomes the first black footballer to play professionally in Scotland.
- The first match played under modern floodlights in Scotland takes place, a friendly at Ochilview Park between Stenhousemuir and Hibernian.

=== 1953 ===
- Celtic win the Coronation Cup, defeating Hibernian 2–0 in the final.

=== 1954 ===
- After qualifying for the World Cup, Scotland are knocked-out after a 1–0 defeat by Austria and a 7–0 defeat by Uruguay. Andy Beattie, appointed manager for the World Cup campaign, is Scotland's first manager but resigns after the loss to Austria.
- Bill Struth stands down as manager of Rangers after 34 years in the role, having won 18 league titles. He is succeeded by Scot Symon.
- Heart of Midlothian win the League Cup for the first time, as they defeat Motherwell 4–2 in the final.
- The SFA joins the Union of European Football Associations (UEFA), the administrative body for association football in Europe.

=== 1955 ===
- The 1955 Scottish Cup Final between Celtic and Clyde is the first final in Scotland to be televised live, and ends in a 1–1 draw. Clyde win the replay 1–0.
- Aberdeen win the league title for the first time.
- Hibernian become the first British club to participate in European competition. They go on to reach the semi-final of the inaugural European Cup, where they were knocked out by Stade Reims.
- Aberdeen win the League Cup for the first time, defeating St Mirren 2–1 in the final.

=== 1956 ===
- The first Scottish league match played under floodlights takes place, between Rangers and Queen of the South at Ibrox.
- Celtic win the League Cup for the first time, after a 3–0 win over Partick Thistle in the replayed final.

=== 1957 ===
- Scotland qualify for the 1958 FIFA World Cup, after finishing top of their qualifying group.
- Celtic defeat Rangers 7–1 in the League Cup final, a record scoreline in a major cup final in British football.

=== 1958 ===
- Heart of Midlothian score a record 132 goals, while conceding only 29, in winning the Scottish league championship.
- Jimmy Murray scores Scotland's first ever goal in a World Cup finals match.
- Scotland are eliminated from the 1958 FIFA World Cup at the group stage, having taken one point from three games, in a 1–1 draw with Yugoslavia.

== 1960s ==
=== 1960 ===
- Rangers reach the semi-final of the European Cup, where they are knocked out by Eintracht Frankfurt.
- Hampden Park hosts the 1960 European Cup Final between Real Madrid and Eintracht Frankfurt. Real Madrid win 7–3 in one of the best known European finals, and regarded by many observers as one of the greatest matches of all time. The crowd of 127,621 is a record for a European final.

=== 1961 ===
- Rangers lose 4–1 on aggregate to ACF Fiorentina in the final of the inaugural European Cup Winners' Cup.
- Dunfermline Athletic under manager Jock Stein reach the final of the Scottish Cup for the first time and win the trophy beating Celtic 2–0 in a replay after a 0–0 draw.

=== 1962 ===
- Dundee win the league title for the first time.
- Hampden Park hosts the 1962 European Cup Winners' Cup final between Atlético Madrid and Fiorentina. The match ended 1–1 in front of a crowd of 29,066; the replay four months later played in West Germany was won 3–0 by Atlético Madrid.
- A Scottish Cup First Round tie between Airdrieonians and Stranraer is postponed a record 33 times (due to poor weather); Airdrieonians win the tie 4–0 before losing 6–0 to eventual champions, Rangers.

=== 1963 ===
- Dundee reach the semi-final of the European Cup, losing 5–2 on aggregate to AC Milan.

=== 1964 ===
- Celtic reach the semi-finals of the European Cup Winners' Cup, where they lose 4–3 on aggregate to MTK Budapest.
- Rangers win the domestic treble.

=== 1965 ===
- Kilmarnock win the league title for the first time, defeating Heart of Midlothian 2–0 on the final day of the season to win the league on goal average ahead of Heart of Midlothian.

=== 1966 ===
- The Scottish Football League authorise the use of substitutes in competitive games. Archie Gemmill of St Mirren becomes the first substitute in Scotland, coming for the injured Jim Clunie in a League Cup tie against Clyde.
- Hampden Park hosts the 1966 European Cup Winners' Cup final between Borussia Dortmund and Liverpool. The West German side win 2–1 after extra time, in front of a crowd of 41,657.

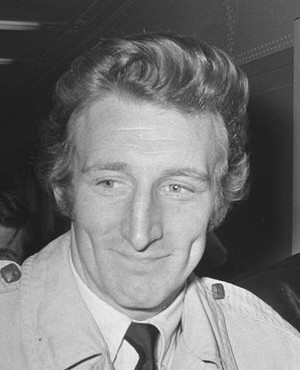
Tommy Gemmell (pictured in 1971) scored one of the goals as Celtic won the 1967 European Cup Final.

=== 1967 ===
- Berwick Rangers defeat Rangers 1–0 in the first round of the Scottish Cup, one of the biggest all-time shocks in the Cup, and described by Rangers' captain John Greig as "probably the worst result in the history of our club".
- Scotland defeat 1966 FIFA World Cup winners England 3–2 at Wembley.
- Celtic win the European Cup, defeating Inter Milan 2–1 in the 1967 European Cup Final. Celtic also win the domestic treble for their first time.
- Rangers reach the 1967 European Cup Winners' Cup Final, but lose 1–0 after extra time against Bayern Munich.
- Third Lanark go out of business after becoming bankrupt.

=== 1968 ===
- Rangers sign Colin Stein from Hibernian for a then Scottish record transfer fee of £100,000.

=== 1969 ===
- Dunfermline Athletic reach the semi-finals of the European Cup Winners' Cup, where they lose 2–1 on aggregate to Slovan Bratislava.
- Celtic win the domestic treble.

== 1970s ==
=== 1970 ===
- Celtic reach the final of the European Cup, knocking out Benfica and Leeds United en route, but lose 2–1 to Feyenoord in the final.
- The introduction of penalty shootouts was sanctioned at the Caledonian Hotel in Inverness. Airdrieonians vs Nottingham Forest in the Texaco Cup was the first game in Scotland to be decided by penalties, with Airdrieonians progressing to the quarter finals.

=== 1971 ===
- 66 people die and over 200 are injured after a crush during a match between Rangers and Celtic at Ibrox Park, after a stairway gave way.
- Partick Thistle win the League Cup for the first time, defeating Celtic 4–1 in the final.
- Goal difference replaces goal average as the means of separating teams tied on the same number of points in the Scottish League.

=== 1972 ===
- Dixie Deans scores a hat-trick in Celtic's 6–1 win over Hibernian in the 1972 Scottish Cup Final, the first hat-trick in a Scottish Cup Final since 1904.
- Rangers beat Dynamo Moscow 3–2 to win the European Cup Winners' Cup. Rangers are beaten 6–3 on aggregate by European Cup winners Ajax in the UEFA Super Cup.
- Hibernian win the League Cup for the first time, defeating Celtic 2–1 in the final.
- The Scottish Women’s Football Association is formed, and Scotland play their first ever official women's international, losing 3–2 to England in Greenock.

=== 1973 ===
- Rose Reilly signs for Stade de Reims, becoming the first Scots woman to play football professionally.
- The crowd of 122,714 that watches Rangers win over Celtic in the 1973 Scottish Cup Final is the last attendance in excess of 100,000 at any match in Britain.
- A 2–1 win over Czechoslovakia at Hampden Park guarantees Scotland a place at the 1974 World Cup after finishing 1st in their qualifying group.

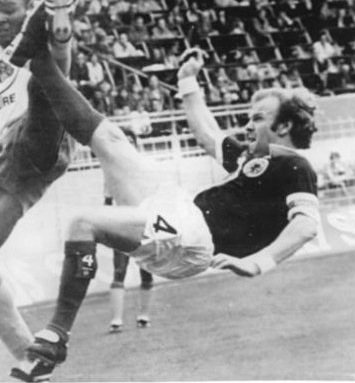
Billy Bremner playing for Scotland in the 1974 World Cup

=== 1974 ===
- Celtic win their ninth consecutive league championship, equalling the world record jointly held at the time by CSKA Sofia and MTK Budapest.
- Scotland are eliminated from the 1974 World Cup at the group stages on goal difference, despite not having lost a match.
- Dixie Deans and Joe Harper both score hat-tricks in the 1974 Scottish League Cup Final. Deans became the first (and so far, only) player to score hat-tricks in Scottish Cup and League Cup finals.
- Ferranti Thistle are voted into the league, narrowly beating Inverness Thistle, as well as teams such as Gala Fairydean Rovers, Hawick Royal Albert, and a Newcastle-upon-Tyne based Gateshead United, and are forced to change their name to Meadowbank Thistle due to the SFL's strict sponsorship rules

=== 1975 ===
- The Scottish Football League is reconstructed, producing a Premier Division of 10 clubs.

=== 1976 ===
- Rangers win the domestic treble.
- Hampden Park hosts the 1976 European Cup final between Bayern Munich and Saint-Étienne. Holders Bayern Munich win 1–0 in front of a crowd of 54,864.

=== 1977 ===
- Scotland clinch qualification for the following year's World Cup in Argentina with a controversial 2–0 win over Wales at Anfield.
- Hibernian become the first professional club in Britain to bear sponsorship on their shirts.
- Clydebank bolt wooden bench seating to their ground's terraces (reducing its capacity under 10,000 to avoid having to comply with expensive safety legislation), and thus Kilbowie Park accommodating 9,950 becomes the first all-seater stadium in Britain.

=== 1978 ===
- Rangers win the domestic treble.
- Scotland are knocked out of the 1978 FIFA World Cup at the group stage, having taken three points (one win, one draw) from three matches.
- Jock Stein leaves Celtic, having won 25 trophies including the European Cup in 1967, for a brief spell as manager of Leeds United, before returning north to take over from Ally MacLeod as manager of Scotland.
- Alex Ferguson becomes manager of Aberdeen, who he goes on to lead to what several sources describe as "unprecedented success", taking over from Billy McNeill who moved to Celtic as their manager.

=== 1979 ===
- Dundee United win the League Cup for the first time, defeating Aberdeen 3–0 in the replayed final.

== 1980s ==
=== 1980 ===
- Aberdeen win the league title, the first side outwith the Old Firm to do so since Kilmarnock in 1965.
- Celtic beat Rangers in the Scottish Cup Final. Thousands of fans from both sides take to the field afterwards and engage in a pitched battle with one another. The aftermath sees both clubs fined £20,000 and various legislation implemented, including the prohibition of the sale of alcohol at football matches in Scotland.
- Hibernian are the first Scottish club to install undersoil heating, at a cost of £60,000, and which is used later in the season to enable their home game against Falkirk to be played despite the wintry weather conditions.
- Ian Wallace becomes the first Scottish footballer to be transferred for over a million pounds, joining Nottingham Forest from Coventry City for £1.25 million.

=== 1982 ===
- The Scotland under-18 side win the 1982 UEFA European Under-18 Championship, defeating Czechoslovakia 3–1 in the final. It remains Scotland's only major tournament win at any level.
- Scotland are knocked out of the 1982 FIFA World Cup at the group stage, having taken three points (one win, one draw) from three matches.

=== 1983 ===
- Aberdeen beat Real Madrid 2–1 after extra time to win the European Cup Winners' Cup. Aberdeen also win the UEFA Super Cup after a 2–0 aggregate win over Hamburger SV.
- Dundee United win the league title for the first time.

=== 1984 ===
- Rangers defeat Celtic 3–2 in the 1983–84 League Cup Final, with Ally McCoist scoring a hat-trick.
- Dundee United reach the semi-final of the European Cup, losing 3–2 on aggregate to AS Roma.

=== 1985 ===
- Scotland qualify for the 1986 World Cup, but manager Jock Stein suffers a heart attack and dies during a qualifying match with Wales. Alex Ferguson takes charge of the side for their playoff game against Australia and for the World Cup.
- Aberdeen win their second league title in a row, and, as of 2026, remain the last non-Old Firm side to win the title, in a record spanning 41 years.

=== 1986 ===
- Kenny Dalglish wins his 100th cap for Scotland, in a friendly match against Romania. He eventually goes on to win 102 caps, a record.
- Graeme Souness is appointed player/manager of Rangers. This marks the start of a significant change at Rangers, as they spend significant amounts of money in attracting star players to the club from England.
- Celtic win the league championship on goal difference, ahead of Heart of Midlothian. Two late goals scored by Dundee forward Albert Kidd cost Heart of Midlothian the championship.
- Scotland are knocked out of the 1986 FIFA World Cup at the group stage, having taken one point from three matches.
- Alex Ferguson leaves Aberdeen, having won ten trophies in eight years including the European Cup Winners' Cup in 1983, to become manager of Manchester United.

=== 1987 ===
- Dundee United reach the 1987 UEFA Cup final, but lose 2–1 on aggregate to IFK Göteborg.
- Rangers win their first league title in nine years.
- Richard Gough becomes the first million pound transfer in Scottish football, joining Rangers from Tottenham Hotspur for around £1.5 million.
- Rangers defeat Aberdeen on penalty kicks in the 1987–88 League Cup Final, after the sides tied at 3–3 after extra time.

=== 1988 ===
- Celtic win the league and cup double in their centenary season.

=== 1989 ===
- Scotland host the FIFA Under 16 World Championship, reaching the final where they lose on penalty kicks against Saudi Arabia after the match finished 2–2 at the end of extra time.
- Former Celtic player Mo Johnston signs for Rangers, ending the club's long-term policy of not signing Roman Catholics.
- St Johnstone open McDiarmid Park, the first purpose-built all-seater football stadium in the United Kingdom.

== 1990s ==
=== 1990 ===
- Scotland are knocked out of the 1990 FIFA World Cup at the group stage, having taken two points (one win) from three matches.

=== 1991 ===
- Graeme Souness leaves Rangers to become manager of Liverpool. His assistant, Walter Smith, takes over at Ibrox, and six years later would lead the club to their ninth successive league title.
- Rangers win the league championship thanks to a decisive win against Aberdeen on the final day of the season.

=== 1992 ===
- Having qualified for the first time, Scotland take part in the finals of the UEFA European Championship. They are knocked out at the group stage of UEFA Euro 1992, having taken two points (one win) from three matches.
- Rangers become the first British club to compete in the group stages of the revamped UEFA Champions League, where they went undefeated but eventually finished second in their group behind eventual (controversial) winners Marseille.
- Top clubs attempt a 'Super League' breakaway following a similar event in England; the move fails but prompts some reconstruction of the League setup which takes effect two years later.

=== 1993 ===
- Rangers win the domestic treble.

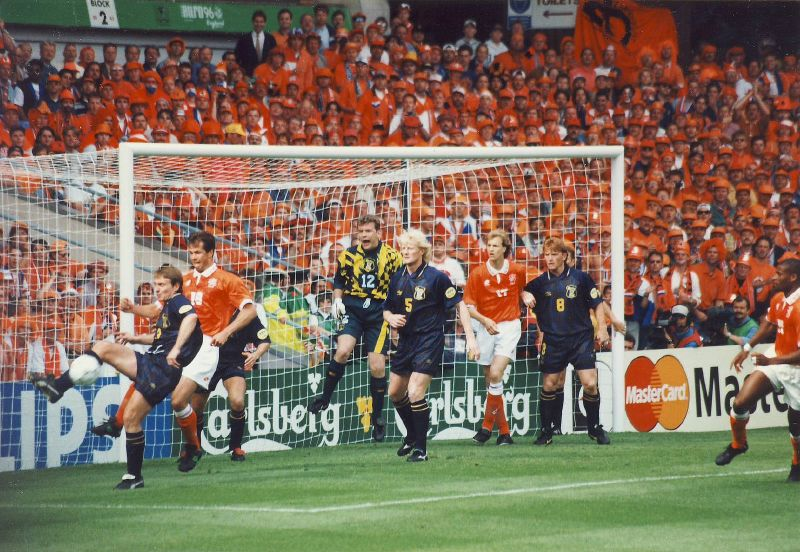
Scotland (in blue) in action against the Netherlands at UEFA Euro 1996

=== 1994 ===
- Fergus McCann takes over as owner of Celtic, rescuing the club from financial ruin. He goes on to reconstitute the club as a PLC, which in turn leads to the most successful share-issue in the history of British football.
- Dundee United win the Scottish Cup for the first time, defeating Rangers 1–0 in the final.
- Caledonian Thistle, later Inverness Caledonian Thistle, and Ross County are admitted to the Scottish Football League.
- Raith Rovers win the League Cup for the first time, defeating Celtic 6–5 on penalties after a 2–2 draw in the final.

=== 1995 ===
- Meadowbank Thistle relocate to Livingston, West Lothian and are renamed Livingston.

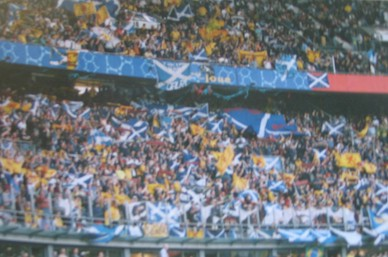
The Tartan Army at the opening match of the 1998 FIFA World Cup, a tournament at which the Scots supporters won an award for good behaviour

=== 1996 ===
- Scotland are knocked out of UEFA Euro 1996 at the group stage on goal difference, having taken four points from three games.

=== 1997 ===
- Rangers win their ninth league championship in a row, equalling the record set by Celtic.
- Paul Lambert becomes the first Scottish (and British) player to win the European Cup/ Champions League with a non-UK club, playing for Borussia Dortmund

=== 1998 ===
- Celtic stop Rangers from winning a record 10 league titles in a row by winning the Scottish league championship.
- Scotland are knocked out of the 1998 FIFA World Cup at the group stage, with 1 point from 3 matches played.
- The Scottish Premier League is formed, as the Premier Division clubs break away from the Scottish Football League.

=== 1999 ===
- Rangers win the domestic treble.
- Scotland fail to qualify for UEFA Euro 2000, losing a two match play-off 2–1 on aggregate to England.

== 2000s ==
=== 2000 ===
- Inverness Caledonian Thistle defeat Celtic 3–1 in the third round of the Scottish Cup. The result, one of the biggest ever upsets in Scottish football, leads to the famous newspaper headline "Super Caley Go Ballistic Celtic Are Atrocious" by The Sun.
- Elgin City and Peterhead are admitted to the Scottish Football League.
- Tore André Flo joins Rangers from Chelsea for a transfer fee of £12 million, a Scottish record.

=== 2001 ===
- Celtic win the domestic treble, their first since 1969.
- Henrik Larsson scores 35 league goals for Celtic, winning him the European Golden Shoe.
- Ally McCoist retires from playing football. He is the highest post-war goalscorer in the Scottish league, with 282 goals.

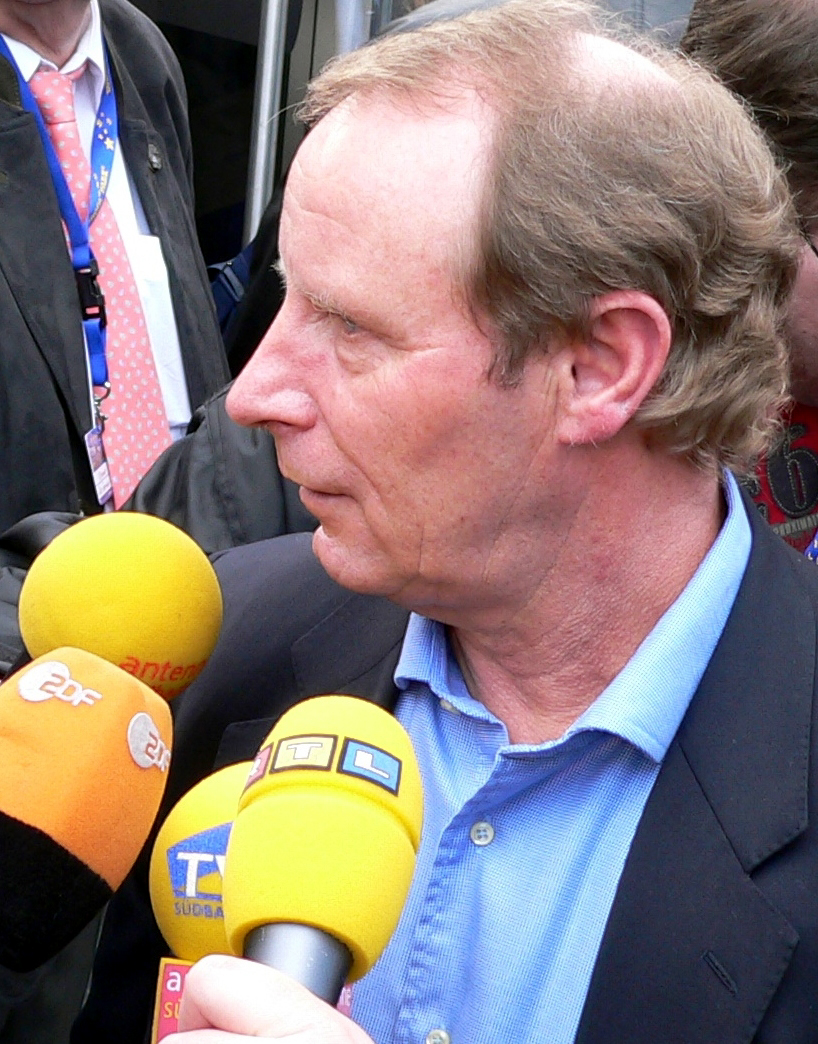
Berti Vogts was appointed manager of the Scotland national team in 2002.

=== 2002 ===
- Berti Vogts is appointed the Scotland national team manager, the first non-Scot to hold the post.
- Airdrieonians are liquidated. Gretna are admitted to the Scottish Football League in their place.
- Hampden Park hosts the 2002 UEFA Champions League final between Real Madrid and Bayer Leverkusen. Real Madrid win 2–1 with Zinedine Zidane scoring the winning goal, a left-footed volley into the top corner, in front of a crowd of 50,499.
- A consortium buys out the few remaining assets of Clydebank, in order to bring Airdrie United into the league.

=== 2003 ===
- Celtic reach the 2003 UEFA Cup Final, but lose 3–2 to F.C. Porto after extra time.
- Rangers win the domestic treble.

=== 2004 ===
- Livingston win the League Cup for the first time, defeating Hibernian 2–0 in the 2004 Scottish League Cup Final.
- Inverness Caledonian Thistle win the Scottish First Division, and are made to groundshare at Aberdeen's Pittodrie Stadium due to the Caledonian Stadium not meeting the SPL's 10,000 capacity threshold, at the behest of Falkirk, who were denied the privilege the season prior. This is eventually reduced to 6,000 seats for the 2005–06 season, and Inverness return to the Caledonian Stadium.

=== 2005 ===
- Rangers win the league championship on the last day of the season, as Celtic concede two late goals against Motherwell.
- Rangers become the first Scottish club to progress from the group stages of the UEFA Champions League to the knockout phase of the tournament.
- The Island Games are held in Shetland, with the hosts taking home the gold medal with a 2–0 win over Guernsey at Gilbertson Park in Lerwick, and the Western Isles finishing 3rd after a 4–0 win over the Isle of Man.

=== 2006 ===
- Scotland reach the final of the UEFA European Under-19 Championship, but lose 2–1 to Spain.
- Gretna become the first team from the third tier to reach the Scottish Cup Final, and draw 1–1 with Hearts after extra time, before losing on penalty kicks.

=== 2007 ===
- Motherwell captain Phil O'Donnell, 35, collapses on the pitch during a Scottish league match against Dundee United, and dies shortly afterwards.
- Celtic sign Scott Brown from Hibernian for £4.4 million, a record transfer fee paid between two Scottish clubs.
- Hampden Park hosts the all-Spanish 2007 UEFA Cup final between Sevilla and Espanyol. Holders Sevilla win 3–1 on penalties after drawing 2–2 at the end of extra-time, in front of a crowd of 47,602.
- The SFA implement changes to qualifying rules for the Scottish Cup, including the allowing of four Scottish Junior Football Association clubs to enter each year.

=== 2008 ===
- A new record low attendance is set in the Scottish Premier League, with only 431 fans turning out to see Gretna lose 2–1 to Inverness Caledonian Thistle at Fir Park in Motherwell.
- Gretna enter administration. Unable to fulfil fixtures, Gretna resign from the Scottish Football League and are subsequently liquidated. Gretna fans set up a new club, Gretna 2008, in its place. Annan Athletic are admitted to the Scottish Football League to fill the vacancy.
- Rangers reach the 2008 UEFA Cup Final, but lose 2–0 to Zenit St. Petersburg.

=== 2009 ===
- Livingston are demoted two divisions for breaching Scottish Football League rules.

== 2010s ==
=== 2010 ===
- Referees go on strike in Scotland over the course of a weekend in November 2010 following a series of controversial incidents and criticism.

=== 2011 ===
- Celtic manager Neil Lennon and two high-profile supporters of the club are sent parcel bombs. The device sent to Lennon is intercepted by the Royal Mail, whilst the two other devices are delivered but treated as suspicious packages and not opened.

=== 2012 ===
- Kilmarnock win the League Cup for the first time, defeating Celtic 1–0 in the final.
- In the first Edinburgh derby Scottish Cup final since 1896, Heart of Midlothian defeat Hibernian by a 5–1 scoreline.
- Rangers enter administration with debts attaining several tens of millions of pounds, including amounts due to HM Revenue & Customs (HMRC). Rangers FC plc is liquidated after HMRC rejects a CVA offer from Charles Green, the preferred bidder. Green instead buys the business and assets of Rangers from the administrator for £1, and forms a new Rangers company, which is denied entry to the Scottish Premier League and is instead admitted into the Scottish Football League Third Division.

=== 2013 ===
- St Mirren win the League Cup for the first time, defeating Hearts 3–2 in the final.
- Heart of Midlothian enter administration, with most of its debts owed to companies connected to Lithuanian owner Vladimir Romanov.
- The Scottish Professional Football League is formed by a merger of the Scottish Premier League and Scottish Football League.
- A new Lowland Football League is formed, as part of wider league reconstruction.
- Celtic sell Victor Wanyama to Southampton for £12.5 million, a record at the time for a fee received by a Scottish club.

=== 2014 ===
- St Johnstone win the Scottish Cup for the first time, defeating Dundee United 2–0 in the final.

=== 2015 ===
- Inverness Caledonian Thistle win the Scottish Cup for the first time, defeating Falkirk 2–1 in the final.

=== 2016 ===
- Ross County win the League Cup for the first time, defeating Hibernian 2–1 in the final.
- Edinburgh City become the first club to be promoted to the SPFL, under the pyramid system instituted in 2013.
- Hibernian win the Scottish Cup for the first time since 1902, defeating Rangers 3–2 in the final.
- Oliver Burke joins RB Leipzig from Nottingham Forest for a transfer fee of around £13 million, a record fee at the time for a transfer involving a Scottish player.

=== 2017 ===
- Celtic win the domestic treble, while going unbeaten in domestic competitive matches for the whole of the 2016–17 season.
- The Scotland women's national team qualify for their first major tournament, the UEFA Women's Euro 2017. Despite a win against Spain in their third match, the team is eliminated on head-to-head record in the group stage.
- Celtic complete a run of 69 matches unbeaten in domestic competitions, breaking their own record of 62 games from over 100 years earlier.

=== 2018 ===
- Dumbarton reach the final of the Scottish Challenge Cup, the club's first major cup final appearance since the 1896–97 Scottish Cup, 121 years earlier. They are beaten 1–0 by Inverness Caledonian Thistle.
- Brechin City fail to win a game in the 2017–18 Scottish Championship, becoming the first Scottish club since Vale of Leven in 1891–92 to go a full season without winning a league game. Brechin also equal the Scottish record for the fewest points scored in a season (four).
- Celtic win the domestic treble for a second consecutive season (the "double treble"), the first Scottish club to do so.
- Celtic sell Moussa Dembélé to Lyon for €22 million (about £19.7 million), at the time a record transfer fee received by a Scottish club.
- Scotland women qualify for their first World Cup finals, by winning UEFA Group 2 with a 2–1 win over Albania in their last group match.
- The Scottish Premiership's 6000 seated capacity rule is scrapped, alternatively making the criteria being a minimum of 500 covered seats.

=== 2019 ===
- Cove Rangers become the first club to gain promotion from the Highland League to the SPFL. They replaced Berwick Rangers, meaning all 42 SPFL clubs are now based in Scotland.
- Celtic win all three domestic trophies for the third consecutive season (the "treble treble").
- Scotland are knocked out of the 2019 FIFA Women's World Cup at the group stage, with one point from three matches played.
- Oli McBurnie moves to Sheffield United from Swansea City for a transfer fee of around £20 million, a record fee for a transfer involving a Scottish player. This record is broken less than a week later, when Kieran Tierney joins Arsenal from Celtic for £25 million.
- Queen's Park, Scotland's oldest club, vote to go professional after 152 years as amateurs

== 2020s ==
=== 2020 ===
- Due to the spread of the COVID-19 pandemic within the United Kingdom, all football in Scotland is suspended on 13 March 2020.
- A new West of Scotland Football League is formed below the Lowland League as part of the senior pyramid system, which sees all 63 clubs join from the West Region of Junior football.
- Scottish Premiership clubs resume training on 11 June 2020, with a view to starting the 2020–21 Premiership season on the first weekend of August 2020, albeit still behind closed doors due to the ongoing COVID-19 pandemic.
- Scotland qualify for UEFA Euro 2020, delayed until 2021 due to the COVID-19 pandemic, by winning a play-off against Serbia on penalties, their first major tournament since 1998.
- Celtic win all three domestic trophies for a fourth consecutive season (the "quadruple treble"), with their league title being their ninth consecutive championship.

=== 2021 ===
- St Johnstone win the Scottish League Cup for the first time, defeating Livingston 1–0 in the final. They go on to complete a cup double by winning the Scottish Cup for the second time, defeating Hibernian 1–0 in the final, becoming the first team outside the Old Firm to win both domestic cup competitions since Aberdeen in 1989–90.
- Rangers prevent Celtic from winning a record 10 league titles in a row by winning the Scottish Premiership and their 55th league title.
- Brechin City become the first club to be relegated from the SPFL into the Highland League after defeat to Kelty Hearts in the League Two play-off, their third relegation in four seasons.
- Scotland are knocked out of the COVID-19 delayed UEFA Euro 2020 at the group stage, with 1 point from 3 matches played.
- All leagues above amateur level are connected for the first time as part of the senior pyramid system, after the SJFA East Region (Midlands League), SJFA North Region, and North Caledonian League join as feeders to the Highland League, with the winners of each of these leagues able to participate in the Scottish Cup regardless of licence. Carnoustie Panmure and Invergordon are the first teams from the Midlands League and North Caledonian League, respectively, under this system, with none from the SJFA North as Banks O' Dee won the league and the Scottish Cup place does not get passed down to the runner up should the winner already qualify through an SFA Licence. Banks O' Dee become the first side to take advantage of this, getting promoted into the Highland League at the expense of Fort William who were forced to forfeit their ties due to being unable to field a team.

=== 2022 ===
- Rangers reach the 2022 UEFA Europa League final, but they lose on penalties to Eintracht Frankfurt.
- The Video Assistant Referee (VAR) is introduced to the Scottish Premiership on matchday 12 in October, having previously been used in Scotland for games at UEFA Euro 2020, as well as Champions League group stage, and Europa League knockout stage matches.

=== 2023 ===
- West of Scotland Premier Division side, Darvel beat Premiership side, Aberdeen 1–0 in the biggest cup shock in the Scottish Cup's history. Darvel become the first non league side to knock out a top flight team since Elgin City knocked out Ayr United in 1966.
- Inverness Caledonian Thistle become the first Scottish Cup finalists to have been eliminated in the same tournament, after they lost 2–0 to Queen's Park, but were reinstated after it was found out Queen's Park fielded an ineligible player. They lost 3–1 to Celtic in the final.
- Albion Rovers are relegated out of the SPFL, losing 2–1 on aggregate to The Spartans, after 120 years in the league setup.
- Celtic win a World Record 8th domestic treble.
- Scotland are confirmed as a co-host in a successful UK and Ireland bid for UEFA Euro 2028, with Hampden being Scotland's sole venue.
- Scotland qualify for UEFA Euro 2024 in Germany, after a 1–0 win for Spain over Norway left them 5 points clear with a game in hand.

=== 2024 ===
- At a summit at Loch Lomond, the IFAB discuss the controversial implementation of Blue Cards, where it is decided that trials of the cards will not be implemented further than grassroots level. Following the conclusion of the meeting, FIFA President, Gianni Infantino, is spotted at St Mirren's 2–1 home win over Aberdeen.
- Buckie Thistle are controversially denied a spot in the League Two playoffs despite having SPFL licences being deferred by the SFA until after the playoffs were due to end. East Kilbride were given a bye to face Stranraer in the final, losing 5–3 on aggregate.
- Celtic become the first club in Scotland to win the men's (Scottish Premiership) and women's (Scottish Women's Premier League) league titles in the same season.
- Scotland are knocked out of UEFA Euro 2024 at the group stage, having taken one point from three games.
- Inverness Caledonian Thistle are relegated to League One and enter administration despite talks with multiple investors, including Danish Billionaire and FC Midtjylland owner, Anders Povlsen. They are the first side to enter administration since Heart of Midlothian in 2013 and first to have points deducted in season due to administration since Dunfermline in 2012–13.
- Bonnyrigg Rose are controversially deducted 6 points by an SPFL Tribunal due to the gradient of the pitch at New Dundas Park. The club had been downgraded from a Bronze to an Entry Level licence in September, despite giving the league and the FA notice that they intend to implement a synthetic turf at the end of the 2024–25 season.
- Dumbarton enter administration over "non receipt of funds owed from the sale of land in 2021". Like Inverness, they are deducted 15 points, and move to the bottom of the League One table.

=== 2025 ===
- Queen's Park defeat Rangers 1–0 in the fifth round of the Scottish Cup; the win away at Ibrox Stadium by the second-tier side being described by the BBC as "one of the biggest upsets in Scottish Cup history".
- Bonnyrigg Rose have their Bronze licence reinstated upon review after it being controversially downgraded the previous October, however, the six point deduction was not overturned.
- Police Scotland say they are open to talks with the SPFL and the Scottish FA over overturning the Alcohol Ban at matches in Scotland, which came into effect following the 1980 Scottish Cup final riot, and has remained in place ever since. However, First Minister John Swinney stated that "the ban would not be lifted any time soon", with critics pointing out the financial benefits for clubs at the lower end of the pyramid, as well as being branded a "Classist Snob" owing to the fact fans have to pay high prices for hospitality, and aren't allowed to drink in view of the pitch, but rugby fans are fully entrusted.
- Queen's Park reach the final of the Scottish Challenge Cup, their first since the 1899–1900 Scottish Cup Final, 125 years prior. They are beaten 5–0 by Livingston in the most one sided final in the tournament's history, and the highest scoring final since the 1999–2000 edition where Alloa Athletic and Inverness Caledonian Thistle drew 4–4.
- Scotland are confirmed as co-host for the 2035 FIFA Women's World Cup, with the UK and Ireland bid being the only one declared valid. In November, the venue shortlist is published, with Hampden Park and Hibernian's Easter Road being the Scottish FA's venue selections.
- Hamilton Academical are deducted 15 points for breaching multiple SPFL rules which ultimately leads to the club being relegated to League One. The club lodges an appeal, but is rejected.
- Falkirk win back to back league titles to earn promotion into the Scottish Premiership, the first time they have been in the top flight since being relegated at the end of the 2009–10 Scottish Premier League season.
- Aberdeen beat Celtic 4–3 on penalties to win the Scottish Cup, their first since the 1989–90 tournament, in which they also beat Celtic on penalties.
- Dumbarton become the first side since Rangers in 2012, and the first side in the SPFL era, to be liquidated, with the newco being waived through by the SPFL and Dumbarton taking their place in League Two with a 5 point deduction for entering administration the season prior.
- Inverness Caledonian Thistle exit administration with former chairman, Alan Savage, purchasing all the shares to the club.
- The Lowland League votes to reconstruct into two different leagues with an East/West format for the 2026–27 season, with the Midlands League becoming a feeder to the Lowland League East instead of the Highland League. Should Brechin City fail to win the Highland League or the League Two playoff, Brechin will transfer into the Lowland League East.
- The Island Games are hosted in Orkney. Jersey are the defending champions. Bermuda U23 won the tournament, beating Ynys Môn 3–1 in the final, Bermuda also win the women's tournament, beating Isle of Man 4–2 on penalties. Hosts, Orkney finished 5th, beating Shetland 3–2 in the 5th place playoff, whilst Western Isles finished in 8th, losing on penalties to Maltese island, Gozo. In the Women's tournament, Western Isles claimed the Bronze medal, whilst Shetland and Orkney finished 7th and 10th, respectively.
- Hamilton Academical are handed a transfer embargo until the end of the 2025–26 season due to further SPFL Rule breaches. In October, they are handed a six point deduction and a £22,000 fine for further SPFL Rule breaches, including evading the embargo by paying players whilst playing them on amateur and trialist contracts. Hamilton are dealt another blow in November, and are left directorless, after the SPFL declares that neither Seref Zengin and Gerry Strain are fit and proper to hold roles as directors. Police Scotland also investigate allegations of fraud taking place at the club. On 31 December, Zengin announces he sold his 97.5% share in the club to Rob Edwards, however, the director left in charge by Strain, Jonny Towers, refuses to leave unless he is paid £300,000, and threatens to liquidate the club should players take strike action over unpaid wages ahead of their League One clash against East Fife, the following Saturday.
- Scotland qualify for the 2026 World Cup hosted by the USA, Canada and Mexico; the first time they have qualified for a World Cup since 1998.

=== 2026 ===
- Inverness Caledonian Thistle win Scottish League One for the first time, becoming the first side in Scottish football league history to win a league title whilst having started on a points deduction.
- Celtic win a record breaking 56th top flight title, having beaten Heart of Midlothian 3–1 in a final day title decider between the two sides at Celtic Park. However, the game is marred in controversy, with Celtic fans invading the field of play upon the third goal being scored, with Hearts players reportedly being assaulted, and being advised by the police to leave the stadium instead of proceeding with media duties and dressing down. The aftermath of the game raised questions of whether the match was abandoned, due to both sides being forced to return to the dressing rooms with 30 seconds of additional time to play, and further gratuity time due to the Celtic goal.
- Similar to Buckie Thistle two seasons prior, Lowland League winners, Linlithgow Rose are controversially denied entry to the SPFL Play-offs due to licencing issues. Brora Rangers receive a bye to the final, and lose 3–1 to Edinburgh City.
- Scotland are knocked out in the Group stage of the World Cup, with a 1–0 win over Haiti, and losing 1–0 to Morocco and 3–0 to Brazil.

== See also ==
- Football in Scotland
