= Minerva F.C. (Scotland) =

Association football club in Glasgow City, Scotland

- Full name: Minerva Football Club
- Founded: 1887
- Dissolved: 1893
- Ground: Temple Park
Home colours

Minerva Football Club was an association football club from Glasgow, which won the Scottish Junior Cup in 1892.

== History ==
The club was formed on 3 March 1887 and quickly became one of Glasgow's leading Junior clubs; by 1891 the club was considered better than many senior XIs. The club finished the 1890–91 season by winning the Glasgow Junior Cup for the only time, with a win over Elderslie. The following season Minerva took the national competition, thanks to a 5–2 win over West Benhar Violet in the final at Cathkin Park, the visitors protesting that rough play saw them reduced to 10 men in the first five minutes.

The triumph however was the club's swansong. It had lost the right to play at Temple Park, and, unable to find a new ground, in March 1892 tried to merge (unsuccessfully) with Partick Thistle. At the end of the season, the club resolved to join the Scottish Football Association, in an effort to demonstrate a more serious approach. However, the move did not work, and the club disbanded at the end of the 1892–93 season; 8 of its players promptly signed up with the Jags and others joined Queen's Park.

== Colours ==
The club played in white.

== Ground ==
The club originally played at Overnewton, moving to Temple Park in Anniesland during its first season.
