= List of Scottish Premier League clubs =

This is a list of all teams that played in the Scottish Premier League from its formation in 1998, through its 2013 merger with the Scottish Football League (forming the Scottish Professional Football League, with the Scottish Premiership becoming the league system's top tier). Founder members are in italics.

== List of clubs ==
Club	Town or city	Total seasons	Total spells	Longest spell	First SPL season	Last SPL season	Seasons	2012–13 finish	Highest finish
Aberdeen	Aberdeen	15	1	15	1998–99	2012–13	1998–2013	8th	3rd
Celtic	Glasgow	15	1	15	1998–99	2012–13	1998–2013	1st	1st
Dundee	Dundee	8	2	7	1998–99	2012–13	1998–2005; 2012–13	12th (relegated)	5th
Dundee United	Dundee	15	1	15	1998–99	2012–13	1998–2013	6th	3rd
Dunfermline Athletic	Dunfermline	9	3	7	1998–99	2011–12	1998–99; 2000–07; 2011–12	9th First Division	4th
Falkirk	Falkirk	5	1	5	2005–06	2009–10	2005–10	3rd First Division	7th
Gretna	Gretna	1	1	1	2007–08	2007–08	2007–08	n/a	12th
Hamilton Academical	Hamilton	3	1	3	2008–09	2010–11	2008–11	5th First Division	9th
Heart of Midlothian	Edinburgh	15	1	15	1998–99	2012–13	1998–2013	10th	2nd
Hibernian	Edinburgh	14	1	14	1999–2000	2012–13	1999–2013	7th	3rd
Inverness CT	Inverness	8	2	5	2004–05	2012–13	2004–09; 2010–2013	4th	4th
Kilmarnock	Kilmarnock	15	1	15	1998–99	2012–13	1998–2013	9th	4th
Livingston	Livingston	5	1	5	2001–02	2005–06	2001–06	4th First Division	3rd
Motherwell	Motherwell	15	1	15	1998–99	2012–13	1998–2013	2nd	2nd
Partick Thistle	Glasgow	2	1	2	2002–03	2003–04	2002–04	1st First Division	10th
Rangers	Glasgow	14	1	14	1998–99	2011–12	1998–2012	1st Third Division	1st
Ross County	Dingwall	1	1	1	2012–13	2012–13	2012–13	5th	5th
St Johnstone	Perth	8	2	4	1998–99	2012–13	1998–02; 2009–2013	3rd	3rd
St Mirren	Paisley	8	2	7	2000–01	2012–13	2000–01; 2006–2013	11th	8th
