= 1891–92 in Scottish football =

Football in Scotland
- Season: 1891–92

1891–92 in Scottish football

Scottish Football League champions
- Dumbarton

Scottish Cup winners
- Celtic

Junior Cup winners
- Minerva

Scotland national team
- 1892 BHC

1891–92 in Scottish football was the 19th season of competitive football in Scotland and the second season of Scottish league football.

== League competitions ==
=== Scottish Football League ===
Dumbarton were crowned Scottish Football League champions after sharing the title the previous season.

Pos	Team	Pld	W	D	L	GF	GA	GD	Pts	Qualification or relegation
1	Dumbarton (C)	22	18	1	3	79	28	+51	37	Champions
2	Celtic	22	16	3	3	62	21	+41	35	
3	Heart of Midlothian	22	15	4	3	65	35	+30	34	
4	Leith Athletic	22	12	1	9	51	40	+11	25	
5	Rangers	22	11	2	9	59	46	+13	24	
6	Renton	22	8	5	9	38	44	−6	21	
6	3rd LRV	22	8	5	9	44	47	−3	21	
8	Clyde	22	8	4	10	63	62	+1	20	
9	Abercorn	22	6	5	11	45	59	−14	17	
10	St Mirren	22	5	5	12	43	60	−17	15	Re-elected
11	Cambuslang	22	2	6	14	21	53	−32	10	Not re-elected
12	Vale of Leven	22	0	5	17	24	99	−75	5	Not re-elected

Rules for classification: 1) Points;
(C) Champions

== Other honours ==
=== Cup honours ===
==== National ====
Competition	Winner	Score	Runner-up
Scottish Cup	Celtic	5 – 1 (Note: Replay needed.)	Queen's Park
Scottish Junior Cup	Minerva	5 – 2	W Benhar Violet

==== County ====
Competition	Winner	Score	Runner-up
Aberdeenshire Cup	Victoria United	2 – 0	Aberdeen
Ayrshire Cup	Annbank	3 – 0	Hurlford
Banffshire Cup	Keith	4 – 1	Portsoy Thistle
Border Cup	Duns	1 – 0	Vale of Gala
Buteshire Cup	Bute Rangers	7 – 1	Bute Thistle
Dumbartonshire Cup	Dumbarton	2 – 0	Vale of Leven
East of Scotland Shield	Hearts	2 – 0	St Bernard's
Fife Cup	Raith Rovers	3 –1	Cowdenbeath
Forfarshire Cup	Montrose	5 – 3	Dundee East End
Glasgow Cup	Celtic	7 – 1	Clyde
Lanarkshire Cup	Airdrie	4 – 3	Wishaw Thistle
Linlithgowshire Cup	Bathgate Rovers	4 – 0	Broxburn Shamrock
North of Scotland Cup	Inverness Caledonian	3 – 1	Inverness Thistle
Perthshire Cup	Dunblane	6 – 1	Vale of Athole
Renfrewshire Cup	Abercorn	2 – 1	St Mirren
Southern Counties Cup	5th KRV	9 – 1	Mid Annandale
Stirlingshire Cup	Campsie	4 – 1	Falkirk

=== Non-league honours ===
==== Senior ====
Division	Winner
Ayrshire League	Annbank
Eastern Alliance	unfinished
Midland League	Raith Rovers
Northern League	Dundee East End / Dundee Our Boys
Scottish Alliance	Linthouse
Scottish Federation	Arthurlie

== Scotland national team ==
Date	Venue	Opponents	Score (Note: Scotland's score is shown first.)	Competition	Scotland scorer(s)
19 March 1892	Solitude, Belfast (A)	Ireland	3–2	BHC	Alex Keillor, William Lambie, David McPherson
26 March 1892	Tynecastle Park, Edinburgh (H)	Wales	6–1	BHC	James Hamilton (2), John McPherson (2), William Thomson, David Baird
2 April 1892	Ibrox Park, Glasgow (H)	England	1–4	BHC	John Bell

Key:

- (H) = Home match
- (A) = Away match
- BHC = British Home Championship

Team	Pld	W	D	L	GF	GA	GD	Pts
England (C)	3	3	0	0	8	1	+7	6
Scotland	3	2	0	1	10	7	+3	4
Ireland	3	0	1	2	3	6	−3	1
Wales	3	0	1	2	2	9	−7	1

Rules for classification: 1) points. The points system worked as follows: 2 points for a win and 1 point for a draw.
(C) Champions

== Other national teams ==
=== Scottish League XI ===
Date	Venue	Opponents	Score (Note: Scottish League XI's score is shown first.)	Scotland scorer(s)
11 April	Pike's Lane, Bolton (A)	(England) Football League XI	2–2	Sandy McMahon, Jack Bell

== See also ==
1891–92 Rangers F.C. season
