= 1893–94 in Scottish football =

Football in Scotland
- Season: 1893–94

1893–94 in Scottish football

Division One champions
- Celtic

Division Two champions
- Hibernian

Scottish Cup winners
- Rangers

Junior Cup winners
- Ashfield

Scotland national team
- 1894 BHC

1893–94 in Scottish football was the 21st season of competitive football in Scotland and the fourth season of Scottish league football. For the first time there were two divisions in the Scottish Football League, there was no automatic promotion and relegation but the bottom three clubs in Division One and the top three clubs in Division Two were subject to a vote of the remaining First Division clubs. This season also saw the introduction of the Highland Football League.

== League competitions ==
=== Scottish Division One ===
Celtic became Scottish Division One champions for the second year in a row, after defeating Rangers 3–2 at Celtic Park on 24 February 1894. Renton were relegated, Dundee and Leith Athletic re-elected to Division One.

| Pos | Team | Pld | W | D | L | GF | GA | GD | Pts | Relegation |
|---|---|---|---|---|---|---|---|---|---|---|
| 1 | Celtic (C) | 18 | 14 | 1 | 3 | 53 | 32 | +21 | 29 | Champions |
| 2 | Heart of Midlothian | 18 | 11 | 4 | 3 | 46 | 32 | +14 | 26 | |
| 3 | St Bernard's | 18 | 11 | 1 | 6 | 53 | 39 | +14 | 23 | |
| 4 | Rangers | 18 | 8 | 4 | 6 | 44 | 30 | +14 | 20 | |
| 5 | Dumbarton | 18 | 7 | 5 | 6 | 32 | 35 | −3 | 19 | |
| 6 | St Mirren | 18 | 7 | 3 | 8 | 49 | 47 | +2 | 17 | |
| 7 | Third Lanark | 18 | 7 | 3 | 8 | 38 | 44 | −6 | 17 | |
| 8 | Dundee | 18 | 6 | 3 | 9 | 47 | 59 | −12 | 15 | |
| 9 | Leith Athletic | 18 | 4 | 2 | 12 | 36 | 46 | −10 | 10 | |
| 10 | Renton (R) | 18 | 1 | 2 | 15 | 23 | 57 | −34 | 4 | Relegated to the 1894–95 Scottish Division Two |

Source: worldfootball.net, Scottish Professional Football League
Rules for classification: Points system: 2 points for a win, 1 point for a draw, 0 points for a loss.
(C) Champions; (R) Relegated

=== Scottish Division Two ===
Clyde were elected to Division One, Hibernian and Cowlairs remained in the Scottish Division Two. Port Glasgow Athletic were docked seven points for fielding an ineligible player.

| Pos | Team | Pld | W | D | L | GF | GA | GD | Pts | Qualification or relegation |
|---|---|---|---|---|---|---|---|---|---|---|
| 1 | Hibernian (C) | 18 | 13 | 3 | 2 | 83 | 29 | +54 | 29 | |
| 2 | Cowlairs | 18 | 13 | 1 | 4 | 72 | 32 | +40 | 27 | |
| 3 | Clyde (P) | 18 | 11 | 2 | 5 | 51 | 36 | +15 | 24 | Elected to 1894–95 Scottish Division One |
| 4 | Motherwell | 18 | 11 | 1 | 6 | 61 | 46 | +15 | 23 | |
| 5 | Partick Thistle | 18 | 10 | 0 | 8 | 56 | 58 | −2 | 20 | |
| 6 | Port Glasgow Athletic | 18 | 9 | 2 | 7 | 52 | 52 | 0 | 13 (Note: Port Glasgow Athletic were deducted 7 points for fielding an ineligible player.) | |
| 7 | Abercorn | 18 | 5 | 2 | 11 | 42 | 60 | −18 | 12 | |
| 8 | Morton | 18 | 4 | 1 | 13 | 36 | 62 | −26 | 9 | Re-elected |
| 8 | Northern | 18 | 3 | 3 | 12 | 29 | 66 | −37 | 9 | Not re-elected (Note: Northern were not re-elected and Thistle did not apply for re-election. Dundee Wanderers and Airdrieonians were elected in their place.) |
| 10 | Thistle | 18 | 2 | 3 | 13 | 31 | 72 | −41 | 7 | Did not apply for re-election |

Updated to match(es) played on May 2013. Source: statto.com, SFHA
Rules for classification: Teams finish equal if level on points. Points system: 2 points for a win, 1 point for a draw, 0 points for a loss.
(C) Champions; (P) Promoted

== Other honours ==
=== Cup honours ===
==== National ====
| Competition | Winner | Score | Runner-up |
|---|---|---|---|
| Scottish Cup | Rangers | 3 – 1 | Celtic |
| Scottish Junior Cup | Ashfield | 3 – 0 | Renfrew Victoria |

==== County ====
| Competition | Winner | Score | Runner-up |
|---|---|---|---|
| Aberdeenshire Cup | Victoria United | 6 – 3 | Orion |
| Ayrshire Cup | Hurlford | 2 – 1 | Saltcoats Victoria |
| Dumbartonshire Cup | Dumbarton | 4 – 1 | Duntocher Harp |
| East of Scotland Shield | Hearts | 4 – 2 | Leith Athletic |
| Fife Cup | Raith Rovers | 6 –2 | Lochgelly United |
| Forfarshire Cup | Dundee | 4 – 0 | Dundee Harp |
| Glasgow Cup | Rangers | 1 – 0 | Cowlairs |
| Lanarkshire Cup | Royal Albert | 2 – 1 (Note: Replay needed.) | Motherwell |
| Linlithgowshire Cup | Broxburn Shamrock | 4 – 0 | Linlithgow Athletic |
| North of Scotland Cup | Inverness Thistle | 2 – 0 (Note: Replay ordered. First match null and void.) | Clachnacuddin |
| Perthshire Cup | Fair City Athletic | 1 – 0 | St Johnstone |
| Renfrewshire Cup | St Mirren | 5 – 4 | Port Glasgow Athletic |
| Southern Counties Cup | 5th KRV | 4 – 1 | Queen of the South Wanderers |
| Stirlingshire Cup | East Stirlingshire | 5 – 0 | Gairdoch |

=== Non-league honours ===
==== Senior ====
Highland League

Top three
| Pos | Team | Pld | W | D | L | GF | GA | GD | Pts |
|---|---|---|---|---|---|---|---|---|---|
| 1 | Inverness Thistle | 12 | 10 | 1 | 1 | 59 | 16 | +43 | 21 |
| 2 | Inverness Caledonian | 12 | 7 | 3 | 2 | 39 | 20 | +19 | 17 |
| 3 | Clachnacuddin | 12 | 7 | 1 | 4 | 26 | 22 | +4 | 15 |

Source: RSSSF

Other Leagues

| Division | Winner |
|---|---|
| Ayrshire Combination | Annbank |
| Ayrshire League | Saltcoats Victoria |
| Border League | |
| East of Scotland League | unfinished |
| Midland League | East Stirlingshire |
| Northern League | unfinished |
| Scottish Alliance | Royal Albert |
| Stirlingshire League | Gairdoch |

== Scotland national team ==
| Date | Venue | Opponents | Score (Note: Scotland's score is shown first.) | Competition | Scotland scorer(s) |
|---|---|---|---|---|---|
| 24 March 1894 | Rugby Park, Kilmarnock (H) | Wales | 5–2 | BHC | Davidson Berry, John Barker, Thomas Chambers, David Alexander, John Johnstone |
| 31 March 1894 | Solitude, Belfast (A) | Ireland | 2–1 | BHC | John Taylor (o.g.) |
| 7 April 1894 | Celtic Park, Glasgow (H) | England | 2–2 | BHC | William Lambie, Sandy McMahon |

Scotland were winners of the British Home Championship in 1894 after pipping England to the trophy.

Key:

- (H) = Home match
- (A) = Away match
- BHC = British Home Championship

| Team | Pld | W | D | L | GF | GA | GD | Pts |
|---|---|---|---|---|---|---|---|---|
| Scotland (C) | 3 | 2 | 1 | 0 | 9 | 5 | +4 | 5 |
| England | 3 | 1 | 2 | 0 | 9 | 5 | +4 | 4 |
| Wales | 3 | 1 | 0 | 2 | 7 | 11 | −4 | 2 |
| Ireland | 3 | 0 | 1 | 2 | 4 | 8 | −4 | 1 |

Rules for classification: 1) points. The points system worked as follows: 2 points for a win and 1 point for a draw.
(C) Champions

== Other national teams ==
=== Scottish League XI ===
| Date | Venue | Opponents | Score (Note: Scottish League XI's score is shown first.) | Scotland scorer(s) |
|---|---|---|---|---|
| 27 January | Celtic Park, Glasgow (H) | (Northern Ireland) Irish League XI | 6–0 | John Taylor, James Blessington, Sandy McMahon (2), Davie Baird, Henry Boyd |
| 21 April | Goodison Park, Liverpool (A) | (England) Football League XI | 1–1 | James Oswald |

== See also ==
- 1893–94 Rangers F.C. season
