= 1890–91 in Scottish football =

Football in Scotland
- Season: 1890–91

1890–91 in Scottish football

Scottish Football League champions
- Dumbarton / Rangers

Scottish Cup winners
- Hearts

Scottish League Charity Cup winners
- Dumbarton

Junior Cup winners
- Vale of Clyde

Scotland national team
- 1891 BHC

1890–91 in Scottish football was the 18th season of competitive football in Scotland. This season saw the introduction of the Scottish Football League with ten teams competing.

== League competitions ==
=== Scottish Football League ===
Dumbarton and Rangers were declared joint champions after drawing a play-off game 2–2 at Cathkin Park, Glasgow on 21 May 1891. Renton started the season as members of the Scottish Football League, but were expelled for professionalism (the game was still officially amateur at this stage). Also, Celtic, Third Lanark and Cowlairs were all docked four points for fielding ineligible players.

Pos	Team	Pld	W	D	L	GF	GA	GD	Pts	Qualification or relegation
1	Dumbarton (Note: Dumbarton and Rangers finished equal on points, and a play-off to determine the winner ended in a 2−2 draw so both teams were declared joint champions.) (C)	18	13	3	2	61	21	+40	29	Joint Champions
1	Rangers (C)	18	13	3	2	58	25	+33	29	Joint Champions
3	Celtic	18	11	3	4	48	21	+27	21 (Note: Celtic, 3rd LRV and Cowlairs were deducted four points each for fielding ineligible players.)	
4	Cambuslang	18	8	4	6	47	42	+5	20	
5	3rd LRV	18	8	3	7	38	39	−1	15	
6	Heart of Midlothian	18	6	2	10	31	37	−6	14	
7	Abercorn	18	5	2	11	36	47	−11	12	
8	St Mirren	18	5	1	12	39	62	−23	11	Re-elected
8	Vale of Leven	18	5	1	12	27	65	−38	11	Re-elected
10	Cowlairs (Note: Cowlairs failed re-election to compete in the league for the next season.) (R)	18	3	4	11	24	50	−26	6	Not re-elected
11	Renton (Note: Renton were expelled from the league in September 1890 for professionalism and their record was expunged.)	0	0	0	0	0	0	0	0	Expelled, record expunged

Rules for classification: 1) Points;
(C) Champions; (R) Relegated

== Other honours ==
=== Cup honours ===
==== National ====
Competition	Winner	Score	Runner-up
Scottish Cup	Hearts	1 – 0	Dumbarton
SFL Charity Cup	Dumbarton	3 – 0	Celtic
Scottish Junior Cup	Vale of Clyde	2 – 0	Chryston Athletic

==== County ====
Competition	Winner	Score	Runner-up
Aberdeenshire Cup	Orion	4 – 1	Caledonian
Ayrshire Cup	Kilmarnock	7 – 1	Hurlford
Border Cup	Selkirk	4 – 3	Hawick Rangers
Buteshire Cup	Bute Rangers	6 – 1	St Blane's
Dumbartonshire Cup	Dumbarton	4 – 1	Vale of Leven
East of Scotland Shield	Hearts	3 – 0	Armadale
Fife Cup	Cowdenbeath	2 –1	Lassodie
Forfarshire Cup	Dundee Our Boys	6 – 2	Dundee East End
Glasgow Cup	Celtic	4 – 0	3rd LRV
Lanarkshire Cup	Airdrie	2 – 1	Albion Rovers
Linlithgowshire Cup	Armadale	2 – 0	Bo'ness
North of Scotland Cup	Camerons	4 – 2	Inverness Union
Perthshire Cup	Dunblane	4 – 2 (Note: Replay needed)	St Johnstone
Renfrewshire Cup	St Mirren	4 – 0	Port Glasgow Athletic
Stirlingshire Cup	East Stirlingshire	4 – 1	Grangemouth

== Edinburgh Exhibition ==
The Edinburgh Exhibition Contest was held to coincide with the 112th International Exhibition held at Meggetland, Edinburgh.

Rather than a one-off tournament, a series of nine games were arranged. The Edinburgh Evening Dispatch newspaper awarded silver cups to the winners of each match.

All matches were played at the exhibition's sports grounds at Meggetland.

== Scotland national team ==
Date	Venue	Opponents	Score (Note: Scotland's score is shown first.)	Competition	Scotland scorer(s)
21 March	The Racecourse, Wrexham (A)	Wales	4–3	BHC	Bob Boyd (2), James Logan, Robert Buchanan
28 March	Celtic Park, Glasgow (H)	Ireland	2–1	BHC	James Low, Tom Waddell
4 April	Ewood Park, Blackburn (A)	England	1–2	BHC	Frank Watt

Key:

- (H) = Home match
- (A) = Away match
- BHC = British Home Championship

Team	Pld	W	D	L	GF	GA	GD	Pts
England (C)	3	3	0	0	12	3	+9	6
Scotland	3	2	0	1	7	6	+1	4
Ireland	3	1	0	2	9	10	−1	2
Wales	3	0	0	3	6	15	−9	0

Rules for classification: 1) points. The points system worked as follows: 2 points for a win and 1 point for a draw.
(C) Champions

== See also ==
- 1890–91 Rangers F.C. season
