= Scottish Premier League =

Professional association football league, contested by clubs from Scotland

- Founded: 1998
- Folded: 2013
- Country: Scotland
- Confederation: UEFA
- Number of clubs: 12 (2000–2013); 10 (1998–2000)
- Level on pyramid: 1
- Most championships: Celtic (8) (Note: The Scottish Premier League only existed between 1998 and 2013. For a complete record of clubs that have won Scottish league championships, see list of Scottish football champions.)

The Scottish Premier League (SPL) was the top-level league competition for professional football clubs in Scotland. The league was founded in 1998, when it broke away from the Scottish Football League (SFL). It was abolished in 2013, when the SPL and SFL merged to form the new Scottish Professional Football League, with its top division being known as the Scottish Premiership. A total of 19 clubs competed in the SPL, but only the Old Firm clubs of Glasgow—Celtic and Rangers— won the league championship.

== Background ==
For most of its history, the Scottish Football League had a two divisional structure (Divisions One and Two) between which clubs were promoted and relegated at the end of each season. However, by the mid-1970s, this organisation was perceived to be stagnant, and it was decided to split into a three divisional structure: Premier Division (formerly Division One), First Division (formerly Division Two) and a newly added Second Division. This system came into force for the 1975–76 season. This setup continued until the 1994–95 season, when – in response to an attempt by the biggest clubs to form a breakaway 'Super League' in 1992 – a four divisional structure was introduced. This involved the creation of a Third Division, with all four divisions consisting of ten clubs.

On 8 September 1997, the clubs in the Premier Division decided to split from the Scottish Football League and form a Scottish Premier League. This followed an earlier example in England, which came into force during the 1992–93 season. This decision was fuelled by a desire by the top clubs in Scotland to retain more of the revenue generated by the game. Originally, league sponsorship money was divided proportionally between clubs in all four divisions. After the SPL was formed, its clubs retained all of its commercial revenues except for an annual payment to the SFL and a parachute payment to recently relegated clubs.

== Competition format ==
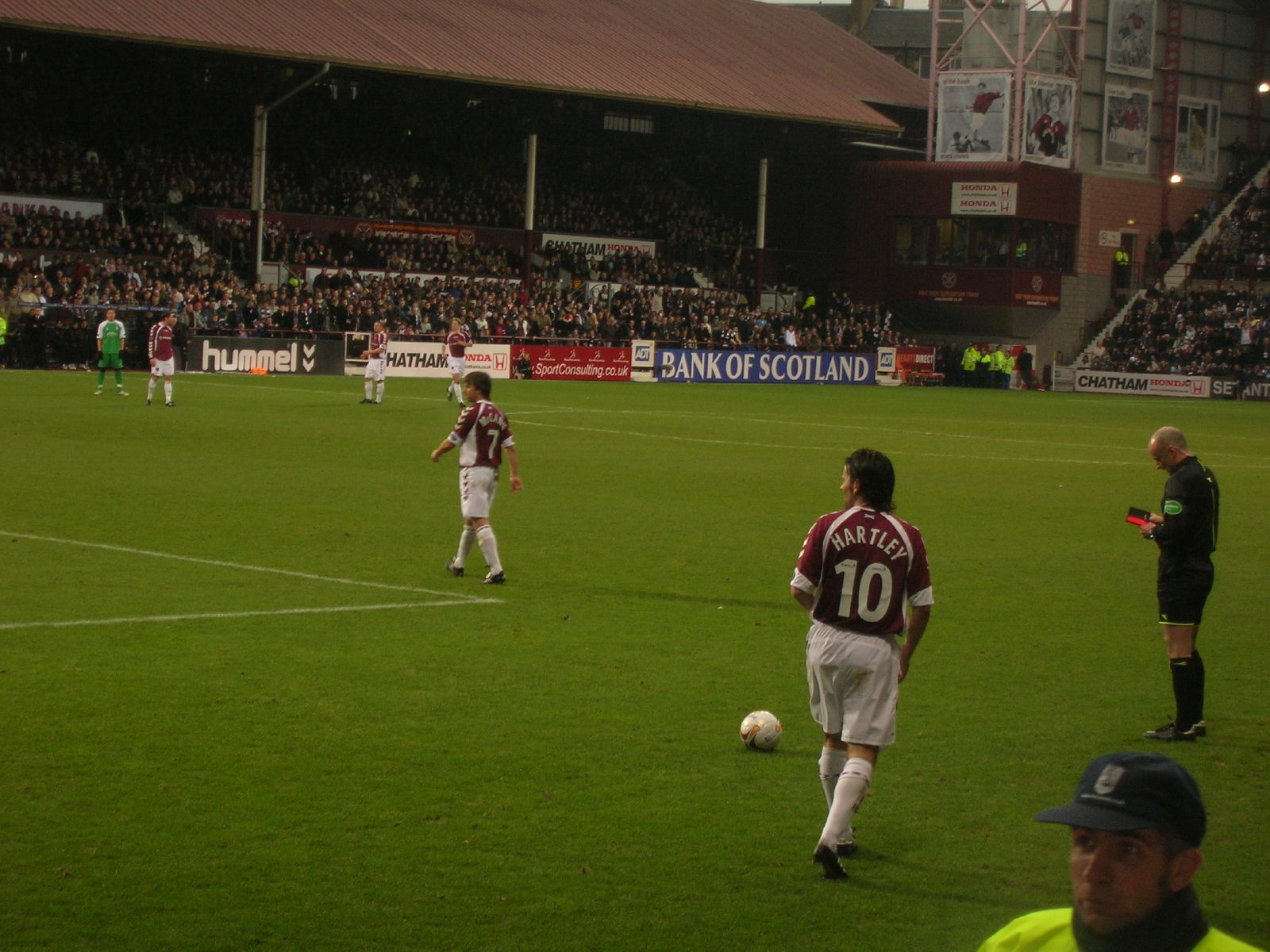
Hearts take on Hibernian in an Edinburgh Derby played at Tynecastle in December 2006

Teams received three points for a win and one point for a draw. No points were awarded for a loss. Teams were ranked by total points, then goal difference, and then goals scored. At the end of each season, the club with the most points was crowned league champion. If points were equal, the goal difference and then goals scored determine the winner.

=== Split ===
Originally the SPL contained 10 clubs, but it subsequently enlarged to 12 for the 2000–01 season and retained this structure until 2013. The increase from 10 clubs to 12 was part of the deal offered to obtain approval from SFL member clubs. After the expansion to 12 clubs, the SPL operated a "split" format. This was done to prevent the need for a 44-match schedule, based on playing each other four times. That format had been used in the Scottish Premier Division but was considered to be too high a number of matches in a league season.

A season, which runs from August (except in 2011–12, when that season began in July) until May, was divided into two phases. During the first phase, each club played three matches against every other team, either once at home and twice away, or vice versa. After this first phase of matches, by which time all clubs had played 33 matches, the league split into a "top six" and a "bottom six". Each club then played a further five matches against the other five teams in their own section. Points achieved during the first phase of 33 matches were carried forward to the second phase, but the teams competed only within their own sections during the second phase. After the first phase was completed, clubs could not move out of their own section in the league, even if they achieved more or fewer points than a higher or lower ranked team, respectively.

At the beginning of each season, the SPL "predicted" the likely positions of each club in order to produce a fixture schedule that ensured the best possible chance of all clubs playing each other twice at home and twice away. This was known as the league seeding and was based on clubs' performance in previous years. If a club did not finish in the half where it was predicted to finish, it faced the possibility of playing an unequal number of home and away matches. For example, one club would sometimes play another three times at home and once away.

There was criticism of the split season format. However, the SPL defended the split format, dismissing the possibility of expanding the league due to a lack of strong enough clubs within the Scottish Football League. In March 2008, Kilmarnock manager Jim Jefferies was the latest to call for a league revamp, claiming the potential for four matches per season against the same opponent was too many.

=== Promotion and relegation ===
The bottom placed SPL club at the end of the season was relegated, and swapped places with the winner of the Scottish First Division, provided that the winner satisfied the SPL entry criteria. These promotion criteria sometimes caused controversy. In 2003, the chairmen of the member clubs voted against Falkirk's proposed ground share with Airdrie United and stopped the club from having the 10,000 capacity stadium it required, therefore saving Motherwell from relegation.

The same situation nearly materialised in 2004. After several votes and discussion, including threats of court cases from Partick Thistle, the team threatened with relegation, Inverness Caledonian Thistle were promoted on the basis that they would ground share with Aberdeen at Pittodrie. In 2005, the stadium size criterion for entry to the SPL was reduced to 6,000, thereby allowing Inverness Caledonian Thistle to return to their home stadium during the 2005–06 season.

=== Old Firm dominance ===
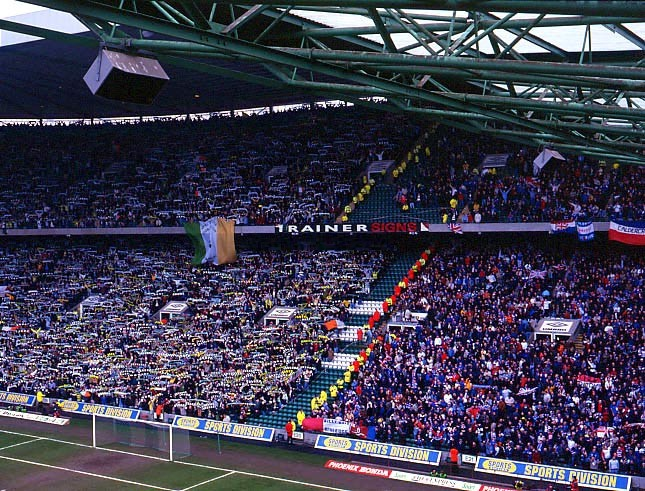
Both sets of fans at an Old Firm match at Celtic Park

One of the main criticisms of the SPL was the dominance of the two Old Firm clubs, Celtic and Rangers. No team outside the Old Firm has won the Scottish league championship since 1985. Until Rangers were ejected from the SPL due to their liquidation, there was only one SPL season (2005–06) where both clubs failed to occupy first and second positions, with Hearts finishing second behind Celtic. While other European leagues were dominated by a few clubs in the 2000s, the Old Firm dominance in Scotland dated back to the beginning of Scottish league football, with a few exceptional periods. The average home attendances of both clubs is significantly higher than the other Scottish clubs, which resulted in the Old Firm having far greater revenues and therefore more money to spend on players. Both clubs also received significant revenues from participation in the UEFA Champions League and the UEFA Europa League.

Despite having more resources than other Scottish clubs, the Old Firm experienced difficulty in competing with big clubs from other leagues in terms of transfer fees and player wages due to the SPL's relatively low television revenue. A recurring theme during the existence of the SPL was the prospect of the two clubs leaving the Scottish football set-up to join the English football league system, an Atlantic League with clubs from countries such as the Netherlands, Belgium and Portugal, or forming a new European Super League. While some observers believed the departure of the Old Firm from the Scottish football setup would be detrimental to Scottish football as a whole, others, such as Craig Levein, believed it would benefit Scottish football due to increased competition among the remaining clubs for the SPL title. World football's governing body FIFA ruled out the prospect of any Old Firm move to the English set-up. The duopoly was effectively broken when Rangers entered administration in 2012 and was liquidated after it failed to reach an agreement with creditors. Rangers was relaunched by a new company and were voted into the Scottish Football League Third Division.

In March 2013, Rangers chief executive Charles Green suggested that Rangers could join the Football Conference and that EU competition law banning restraints of trade could be used to overcome any legal barriers to such a plan. Green also suggested that Rangers and Celtic would not be playing in the Scottish league system in ten years time. Scotland manager Gordon Strachan said he believed the Old Firm clubs would join a future new 38-club two-division European Super League.

=== Winter break ===
The SPL instituted a "winter break" during the January of each season, beginning with the 1998–99 season. However, this practice was removed beginning in the 2000–01 season, forcing clubs to play throughout January and sometimes resulting in postponement of matches and significant damage to clubs' pitches. Managers Martin O'Neill, Jim Duffy and Walter Smith were among those who called for the winter break to be reinstated. Alex McLeish accused the SPL of taking Scottish football "back to the Dark Ages" after its decision to scrap the mid-season hiatus.

=== European qualification ===
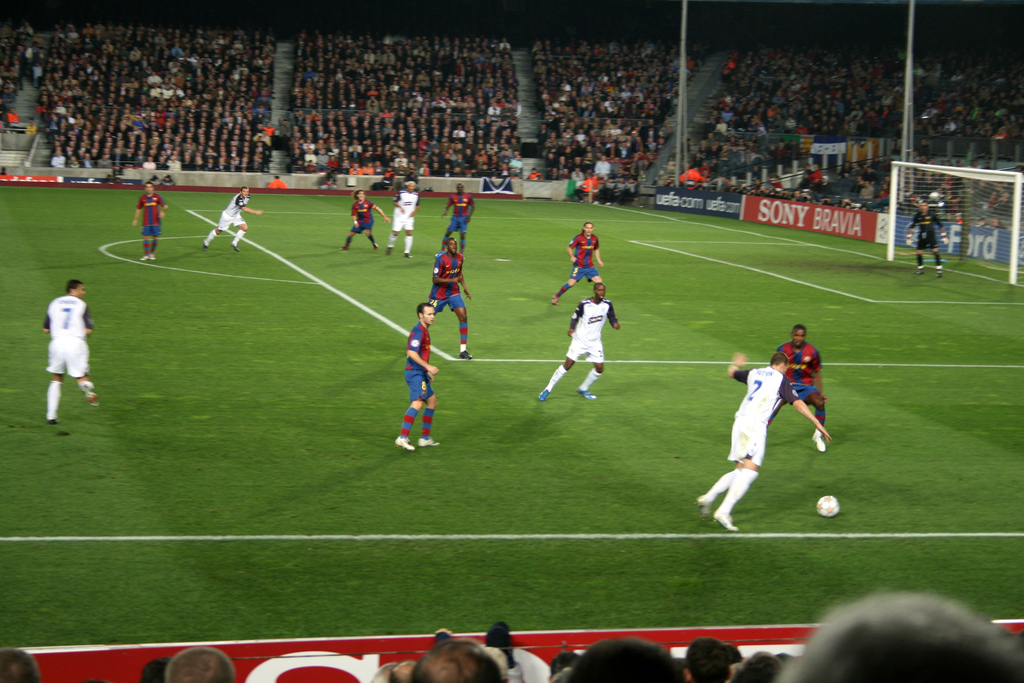
Rangers playing Barcelona at the Camp Nou in the 2007–08 Champions League

In the seasons after the SPL's inception, Scotland's UEFA coefficient improved significantly, having been ranked 26th in 1998–99, they reached a high of 10th at the end of the 2007–08 season. The SPL ranking thereafter declined, the league falling back to the 24th position at the end of 2012–13.

In 2003, Celtic became the first Scottish club since Dundee United in 1987 to reach a European final, eventually losing 3–2 to Porto after extra time in the UEFA Cup final. In 2003–04, two Scottish clubs, Celtic and Rangers, qualified for the UEFA Champions League for the first time. In 2005–06, Rangers became the first Scottish club to reach the knockout stage of the Champions League, a feat repeated by Celtic the following two seasons. In the 2007–08 season, three Scottish clubs were competing in Europe after Christmas for the first time since 1970, while in the same season, Rangers reached the 2008 UEFA Cup final, but lost 2–0 to Russian club Zenit Saint Petersburg. During the season, Scotland's European representatives collected the most coefficient points since the 1982–83 season.

== Players ==
Scottish Premier League clubs had almost complete freedom to sign whatever number and category of players they wish. There was no team or individual salary cap, no squad size limit, no age restrictions other than those applied by general employment law, no restrictions on the overall number of foreign players and few restrictions on individual foreign players. All players with EU nationality, including those able to claim an EU passport through a parent or grandparent, were eligible to play, and top players from outside the EU were able to obtain UK work permits.

The only restriction on selection was the "Under-21 rule". This rule stated that each club must include at least three players under the age of 21 in its matchday squad. Opinions on this rule were divided among SPL managers. Walter Smith, Gus MacPherson and Jim Jefferies expressed their disapproval of the policy. John Collins approved of the ruling, claiming it is healthy for Scottish football and encouraged the development of young players.

A decline in television revenue resulted in relatively little spending among SPL clubs, with major transfer spending mostly limited to the Old Firm clubs. As a result, most clubs became reliant on developing their own young players and selling them on for profit. This also resulted in a large proportion of SPL clubs' squads being made up of Scottish players (73% in the 2004–05 season).

== Finances ==
=== Attendance ===
Due to its relatively low income from television and commercial partners, Scottish clubs were highly dependent on revenues from fans attending matches. More people in Scotland per head of population watched their domestic top-level league than any other European nation. All ten of the clubs that played in the 1998–99 Scottish Premier League also participated in the 2011–12 Scottish Premier League. Nine of those ten clubs recorded lower average attendance. Celtic had a 14% decline in attendance since a peak season of 2000–01, when the club won the domestic treble. Dunfermline, who were newly promoted to the SPL in 2011–12, only saw an increase of 939 in average attendance from the 2010–11 Scottish First Division season. They also attracted a bigger crowd for a Fife derby game in the First Division against Raith Rovers than any game in the SPL.

=== Sponsorship ===
The Bank of Scotland, which had sponsored the league since March 1999 (the League was unsponsored for most of the inaugural season), did not renew its sponsorship at the end of the 2006–07 season. Talks began with Clydesdale Bank, and a four-year contract worth £8 million came into effect from July 2007; in 2010, the contract was extended until 2013.

=== Insolvency events ===
During the SPL era, six of its member clubs entered administration. Serious financial difficulties first arose in 2002 when broadcaster Sky Sports withdrew its interest in the League's television rights when the SPL rejected its offer of £45 million, hoping a better deal would arise from another broadcaster. However, a superior deal failed to arise, adding to the clubs' already delicate financial position. Total debt among SPL clubs was estimated during 2001–02 to be around £132m, having been barely into double figures two years previously. Motherwell became the first SPL club to enter administration in April 2002, with debts of £11 million and a wage bill totalling 97% of the club's annual turnover. Dundee were next to follow, when in November 2003 it sacked 25 staff after debts of £20 million.

The severity of the SPL's financial problems were revealed in September 2003 when combined losses for SPL clubs during 2001–02 was estimated to have been £60 million. A report by PricewaterhouseCoopers (PWC) in 2003 described five SPL clubs – Dundee, Dunfermline Athletic, Hearts, Hibernian and Livingston – as "technically insolvent". Livingston became the third SPL club to enter administration in February 2004 with debts of £3.5 million. Dunfermline Athletic's financial position also looked bleak, with several players asked to take wage-cuts, while Rangers chairman David Murray announced in September 2004 a plan to raise £57 million via a rights issue in an attempt to eliminate a large proportion of the club's debts.

After widespread cost-cutting measures, the finances of SPL clubs began to show signs of improvement. Both Motherwell and Dundee came out of administration in April and August 2004 respectively, while Livingston ended its 15-month spell in administration in May 2005. The 2006 report on SPL finances by PWC revealed operating profits of £2.8 million among SPL clubs, the first collective operating profit made by Scotland's top-flight clubs in over a decade. Seven of the SPL's 12 clubs had a wage turnover ratio of less than 60%.

The 2007 report by PWC revealed a collective loss of £9 million for 2005–06, although six clubs – Falkirk, Hibernian, Inverness CT, Kilmarnock, Motherwell and Rangers – made a profit. The report highlighted the increasingly precarious financial position of Hearts, describing its current finances as "unsustainable" with debt rising by £7 million to £28 million and a wage bill which represents 97% of its turnover. The figures for 2006–07 showed a collective profit of £3 million, with eight clubs making a profit.

In March 2008, Gretna became the fourth SPL club to enter administration. The club's main benefactor, Brooks Mileson, was forced to withdraw his financial support due to failing health. The club was liquidated after it had been relegated to the Scottish Football League at the end of the 2007–08 Scottish Premier League. Gretna fans formed a new club, Gretna 2008, which entered the East of Scotland Football League.

SPL clubs were badly affected by the Great Recession in Europe. The 21st PWC annual review found that SPL clubs made a collective loss of £22 million during the 2008–09 season, although this loss was almost entirely due to problems at two clubs. Rangers incurred a £14 million loss after losing most of their European revenues due to an early defeat by FBK Kaunas, while Hearts lost £8 million. In 2010, Hearts was described by The Scotsman as the only true financial "basket case" in the SPL, with the club having a wages-to-turnover ratio of 126% and debt of over three times turnover. Rangers stabilised financially in the next two seasons, thanks to income generated from Champions League participation. Rangers entered administration on 14 February 2012, owing an approximate £9 million in unpaid taxes and with an ongoing tribunal with HMRC. HMRC blocked a proposed Company Voluntary Arrangement in June 2012, forcing preferred bidder Charles Green to use a new company to buy out the business and assets of Rangers. Weeks before the SPL merged into the Scottish Professional Football League, Hearts became the sixth SPL club to enter administration.

== Media coverage ==
=== Television ===
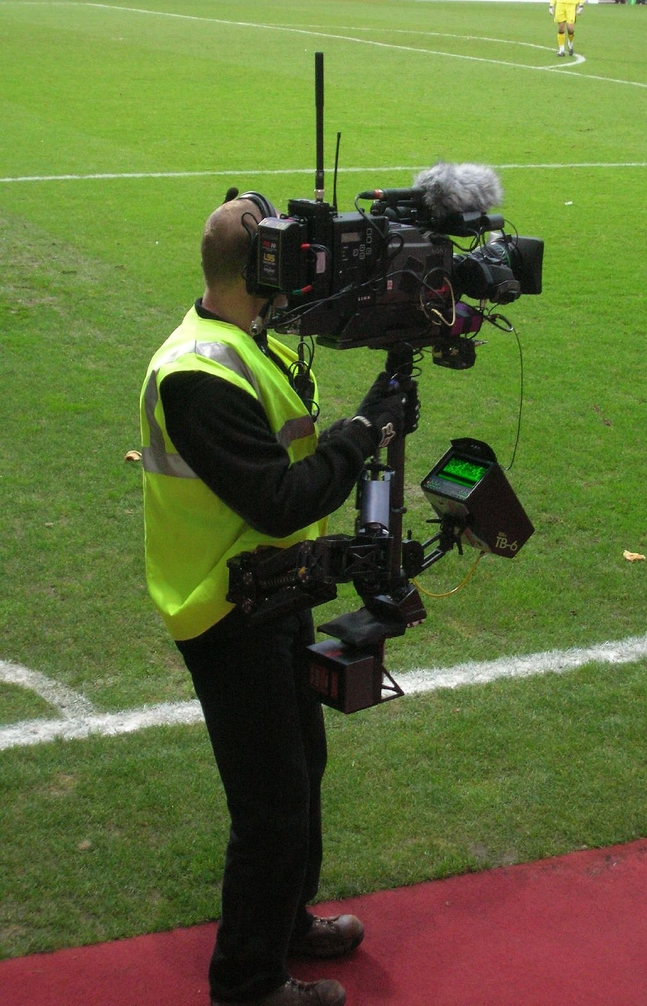
A cameraman pitchside at Tynecastle Stadium

Between 1998–99 and 2001–02, exclusive television rights for live Scottish Premier League matches were held by Sky Sports. In January 2002, the SPL rejected a £45 million offer from Sky Sports and began considering setting up its own pay-per-view channel, dubbed "SPL TV". However, these plans broke down in April 2002 when the Old Firm clubs – Rangers and Celtic – utilised the 11–1 voting system to veto the proposals. This caused discontent among the remaining ten SPL clubs, which subsequently announced their intention to resign from the league.

Despite a two-year television deal being agreed with BBC Scotland in July 2002 for a significant amount less than previously offered by Sky Sports, the ten non-Old Firm clubs confirmed their resignation from the SPL in August 2002, citing discontent with the voting system. The ten clubs withdrew their resignations in January 2003 after an agreement was reached to change some of the voting procedures and to change the distribution of TV revenue.

The SPL agreed a television rights deal with Irish broadcaster Setanta Sports in February 2004 in a four-year deal worth £35 million. This deal was revised in 2006, with a two-year extension to the original deal agreed, the new four-year deal now being worth £54.5 million and running to 2010. In June 2008, it was announced that a further four-year deal would commence for the 2010–11 season, worth £125 million. Setanta lost the rights to show live SPL matches in the United Kingdom as it was unable to pay the £3 million it owed to the SPL. The SPL then agreed a deal with ESPN and Sky Sports worth £13 million per season to the clubs. This was comparable to the deal which was in place with Setanta, but it was around half the amount Setanta was due to pay from 2010. The Old Firm criticised the decision of nine of the other SPL clubs to accept that offer from Setanta, instead of taking an alternative package from Sky that would have been worth significantly more than the deal signed after Setanta went into administration.

In 2009, Sky and ESPN agreed a five-year deal with the SPL where they would pay a total of £65 million for the rights to show 30 matches each per season. In November 2011, it was announced that a five-year extension to the contract would commence from the 2012–13 season. This deal was amended after Rangers entered insolvency and was not allowed to transfer its SPL membership to a new company. The rights held by ESPN were acquired by BT Sport in February 2013.

BBC Scotland's Sportscene held the rights to broadcast highlights of each match first on terrestrial TV. The BBC also held the rights to show online Internet highlights to UK users for one week after each match. BBC Alba, launched in September 2008, showed one full SPL match per week in delayed coverage. BBC Alba also showed some live matches in the 2012–13 season. The SPL was broadcast in Australia by Setanta Sports Australia, in Canada by Sportsnet World and in the United States by Fox Soccer Channel and Fox Soccer Plus.

=== Radio ===
Radio broadcasting rights were held by BBC Radio Scotland. BBC Radio Scotland also provided internet webcasts to all Scottish Premier League matches, having become the first broadcaster to introduce such a service in June 2000. Old Firm matches were also broadcast on BBC Radio 5 Live and 102.5 Clyde 1.

== Member clubs ==
The clubs listed below competed in the Scottish Premier League. Teams in italics were founder members, who played in the 1998–99 competition.

Club	City/Town
Aberdeen	Aberdeen
Celtic	Glasgow
Dundee	Dundee
Dundee United	Dundee
Dunfermline Athletic	Dunfermline
Falkirk	Falkirk
Gretna	Gretna
Hamilton Academical	Hamilton
Heart of Midlothian	Edinburgh
Hibernian	Edinburgh
Inverness CT	Inverness
Kilmarnock	Kilmarnock
Livingston	Livingston
Motherwell	Motherwell
Partick Thistle	Glasgow
Rangers	Glasgow
Ross County	Dingwall
St Johnstone	Perth
St Mirren	Paisley

== Stadia ==
The following stadia were used by clubs in the Scottish Premier League.

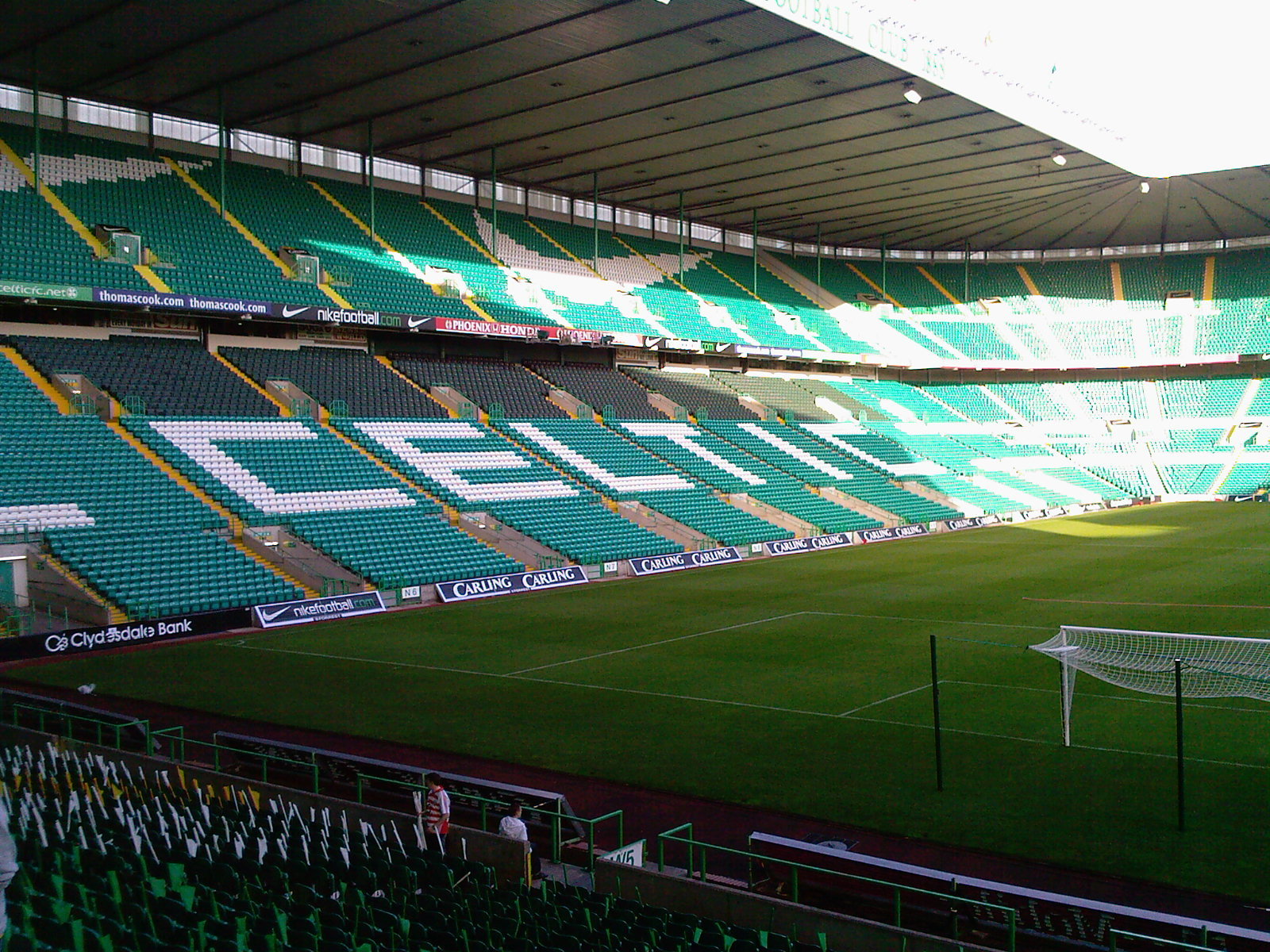
Celtic Park, the biggest stadium by capacity used in the SPL.

Stadium	Club(s)	Notes
Almondvale Stadium	Livingston and Gretna	Gretna played one home game at Almondvale during the 2007–08 season due to the bad condition of the Fir Park pitch.
Caledonian Stadium	Inverness Caledonian Thistle	
Celtic Park	Celtic	The biggest club stadium in Scotland by seating capacity.
Dens Park	Dundee	
East End Park	Dunfermline Athletic	
Easter Road	Hibernian	
Falkirk Stadium	Falkirk	
Fir Park	Motherwell and Gretna	Gretna used Fir Park for most of the 2007–08 season because their normal home ground, Raydale Park, did not meet SPL requirements.
Firhill Stadium	Partick Thistle	
Ibrox Stadium	Rangers	
Love Street	St Mirren	Love Street was closed in January 2009.
McDiarmid Park	St Johnstone	First purpose-built all-seater stadium in Scotland.
New Douglas Park	Hamilton Academical	
Pittodrie Stadium	Aberdeen and Inverness C.T.	Inverness C.T. moved to Aberdeen's Pittodrie Stadium for part of the 2004–05 season while the Caledonian Stadium was upgraded to meet capacity regulations.
Rugby Park	Kilmarnock	
St Mirren Park	St Mirren	Opened in January 2009.
Tannadice Park	Dundee United	
Tynecastle Stadium	Heart of Midlothian	
Victoria Park	Ross County	

== Statistics ==
=== Championships ===
Season	Winner	Runner-up	Relegated	Top scorer	Players' Player of the Year	Writers' Player of the Year
1998–99	Rangers (1)	Celtic (1)	Dunfermline Athletic	Henrik Larsson 29 (Celtic)	Henrik Larsson (Celtic)	Henrik Larsson (Celtic)
1999–2000	Rangers (2)	Celtic (2)	No relegation (Note: The SPL was expanded from 10 teams in 1999–2000 to 12 teams in 2000–01. There was due to be a play-off involving the team that finished bottom of the SPL (Aberdeen) and the teams finishing second and third in the First Division (Dunfermline Athletic and Falkirk) for two places in the SPL, but this was cancelled because Falkirk did not meet the stadium criteria for SPL membership.)	Mark Viduka 25 (Celtic)	Mark Viduka (Celtic)	Barry Ferguson (Rangers)
2000–01	Celtic (1)	Rangers (1)	St Mirren	Henrik Larsson 35 (Celtic)	Henrik Larsson (Celtic)	Henrik Larsson (Celtic)
2001–02	Celtic (2)	Rangers (2)	St Johnstone	Henrik Larsson 29 (Celtic)	Lorenzo Amoruso (Rangers)	Paul Lambert (Celtic)
2002–03	Rangers (3)	Celtic (3)	No relegation (Note: Motherwell finished bottom of the SPL but avoided relegation because the team that finished top of the First Division (Falkirk) did not meet the stadium criteria for SPL membership.)	Henrik Larsson 28 (Celtic)	Barry Ferguson (Rangers)	Barry Ferguson (Rangers)
2003–04	Celtic (3)	Rangers (3)	Partick Thistle	Henrik Larsson 30 (Celtic)	Chris Sutton (Celtic)	Jackie McNamara (Celtic)
2004–05	Rangers (4)	Celtic (4)	Dundee	John Hartson 25 (Celtic)	John Hartson (Celtic); Fernando Ricksen (Rangers)	John Hartson (Celtic)
2005–06	Celtic (4)	Heart of Midlothian (1)	Livingston	Kris Boyd 32 (15 – Kilmarnock, 17 – Rangers)	Shaun Maloney (Celtic)	Craig Gordon (Hearts)
2006–07	Celtic (5)	Rangers (4)	Dunfermline Athletic	Kris Boyd 20 (Rangers)	Shunsuke Nakamura (Celtic)	Shunsuke Nakamura (Celtic)
2007–08	Celtic (6)	Rangers (5)	Gretna	Scott McDonald 25 (Celtic)	Aiden McGeady (Celtic)	Carlos Cuéllar (Rangers)
2008–09	Rangers (5)	Celtic (5)	Inverness CT	Kris Boyd 27 (Rangers)	Scott Brown (Celtic)	Gary Caldwell (Celtic)
2009–10	Rangers (6)	Celtic (6)	Falkirk	Kris Boyd 23 (Rangers)	Steven Davis (Rangers)	David Weir (Rangers)
2010–11	Rangers (7)	Celtic (7)	Hamilton Academical	Kenny Miller 21 (Rangers)	Emilio Izaguirre (Celtic)	Emilio Izaguirre (Celtic)
2011–12	Celtic (7)	Rangers (6)	Dunfermline Athletic	Gary Hooper 24 (Celtic)	Charlie Mulgrew (Celtic)	Charlie Mulgrew (Celtic)
2012–13	Celtic (8)	Motherwell (1)	Dundee	Michael Higdon 26 (Motherwell)	Michael Higdon (Motherwell)	Leigh Griffiths (Hibernian)

=== All-time SPL table ===
This table is a cumulative record of all SPL matches played. The table is accurate from the 1998–99 season to the end of the 2012–13 season, inclusive.

P	Club	Ssn	Pld	W	D	L	F	A	GD	Pts	PPG	1st	2nd	3rd	4th
1	Celtic	15	566	412	82	72	1304	453	+851	1318	2.329	8	7		
2	Rangers (Note: Rangers were deducted 10 points for going into administration in the 2011–12 season.)	14	528	364	93	71	1150	418	+732	1175	2.225	7	6	1	
3	Heart of Midlothian	15	566	229	139	198	733	670	+63	826	1.459		1	5	1
4	Motherwell	15	566	195	132	239	708	839	−131	717	1.267		1	2	1
5	Kilmarnock	15	566	189	145	232	685	811	−126	712	1.258				3
6	Aberdeen	15	566	188	143	235	651	785	−134	707	1.249			1	4
7	Hibernian	14	530	183	134	213	712	761	−49	683	1.289			2	2
8	Dundee United	15	566	173	162	231	674	845	−171	681	1.203			1	2
9	Inverness CT	8	304	97	83	124	380	417	−37	374	1.23				1
10	St Johnstone	8	300	90	87	123	307	398	−91	357	1.19			2	
11	Dunfermline Athletic	9	340	83	89	168	335	565	−230	338	0.994				1
12	Dundee	8	300	87	70	143	336	478	−142	331	1.103				
13	St Mirren	8	304	68	91	145	277	446	−169	295	0.97				
14	Falkirk	5	190	51	48	91	197	277	−80	201	1.058				
15	Livingston	5	190	48	45	97	205	306	−101	189	0.995			1	
16	Hamilton Academical	3	114	30	26	58	93	158	−65	116	1.018				
17	Partick Thistle	2	76	14	19	43	76	125	−49	61	0.803				
18	Ross County	1	38	13	14	11	47	48	−1	53	1.395				
19	Gretna (Note: Gretna were deducted 10 points for going into administration in the 2007–08 season.)	1	38	5	8	25	32	83	−51	13	0.342				

P = Position; Ssn = Number of seasons; Pld = Matches played; W = Matches won; D = Matches drawn; L = Matches lost; GF = Goals for; GA = Goals against; GD = Goal difference; Pts = Points; Ppg = Points per game

=== Top goalscorers ===
Kilmarnock and Rangers player Kris Boyd scored the most goals in the SPL, with 167 goals. He broke the previous record of 158, set by Henrik Larsson, by scoring five goals for Rangers in a 7–1 win against Dundee United on 30 December 2009. Boyd and Larsson were the only players who scored more than 100 goals in the SPL era. There are players who scored far more goals in the predecessor Scottish Football League competition, with Jimmy McGrory holding the overall record with 408 goals in the top flight of Scottish football.

==== Top 10 SPL goalscorers ====
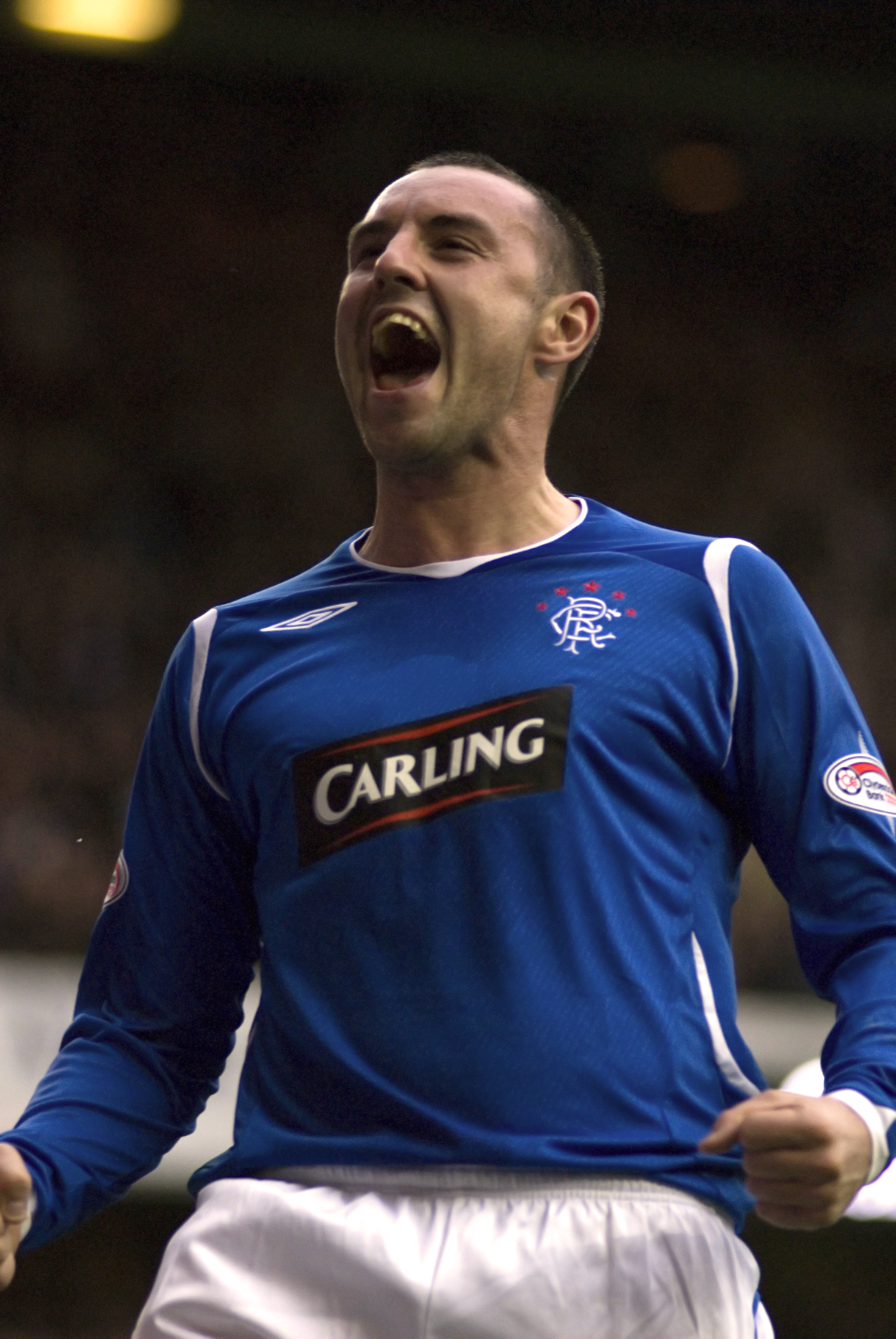
Kris Boyd, the SPL's all-time top goalscorer

Rank	Player	Club(s) (Note: Clubs only include those where players scored goals in the Scottish Premier League.)	Goals
1	Kris Boyd	Kilmarnock (2001–2006); Rangers (2006–2010); Kilmarnock (2013)	167
2	Henrik Larsson (Note: Player also scored goal(s) in the Scottish Football League.)	Celtic (1998–2004)	158
3	Derek Riordan	Hibernian (2001–2006); Celtic (2006–2008); Hibernian (2008–2011); St Johnstone (2012)	95
4	Scott McDonald	Motherwell (2004–2007); Celtic (2007–2010)	93
5	John Hartson	Celtic (2001–2006)	88
6	Kenny Miller	Hibernian (1999–2000); Rangers (2000–2001); Celtic (2006–2007); Rangers (2008–2011)	75
7	Michael Higdon	Falkirk (2007–2009); St Mirren (2009–2011); Motherwell (2011–2013)	73
7	Nacho Novo	Dundee (2002–2004); Rangers (2004–2010)	73
9	Anthony Stokes	Falkirk (2006–2007); Hibernian (2009–2010); Celtic (2010–2013)	67
10	Colin Nish	Dunfermline Athletic (1999–2003); Kilmarnock (2003–2008); Hibernian (2008–2011); Dundee (2012–2013)	64

=== Records and awards ===
Biggest home win
Celtic 9–0 Aberdeen (2010–11)
Biggest away win
Dunfermline Athletic 1–8 Celtic (2005–06)
Most goals in a game
Motherwell 6–6 Hibernian (2009–10)
Most consecutive wins
Celtic, 25, 2003–04
Most consecutive games unbeaten
Celtic, 32, 2003–04
Most consecutive defeats
Partick Thistle, 10, 2003–04
Most consecutive games without a win
Hamilton Academical, 22, 2010–11
Most consecutive games without scoring a goal
Dunfermline Athletic, 9, 2006–07
Most points in a season
Celtic, 103 points, 2001–02
Fewest points in a season
Gretna, 13 points, 2007–08 (Note: Gretna's points total would have been 23 points without a 10-point administration penalty they received. The lowest points total without such a penalty is 18 points, which was recorded by Livingston in 2005–06.)
Most goals scored in a season
Celtic, 105 goals, 2003–04
Fewest goals scored in a season
St Johnstone, 23 goals, 2010–11
Most goals conceded in a season
Aberdeen, 83 goals, 1999–00
Gretna, 83 goals, 2007–08
Fewest goals conceded in a season
Celtic, 18 goals, 2001–02
Most wins in a season
Celtic, 33, 2001–02
Fewest wins in a season
Dunfermline Athletic, 4, 1998–99
Livingston, 4, 2005–06
Fewest defeats in a season
Celtic, 1, 2001–02
Most defeats in a season
Livingston, 28, 2005–06
Most draws in a season
Dunfermline Athletic, 16, 1998–99
St Mirren, 16, 2011–12
Fewest home defeats in a season
Celtic, 0, 2001–02 and 2002–03
Rangers, 0, 2009–10
Fewest away defeats in a season
Celtic, 0, 2003–04
Fewest home wins in a season
Hamilton Academical, 1, 2010–11
Dunfermline Athletic, 1, 2011–12
Fewest away wins in a season
Dunfermline Athletic, 0, 1998–99
Youngest player
Scott Robinson, for Hearts vs Inverness CT, 16 years, 45 days
Youngest goalscorer
Fraser Fyvie, for Aberdeen vs Heart of Midlothian, 16 years, 306 days
Oldest player
Andy Millen, for St Mirren vs Hearts, 42 years 279 days, 15 March 2008
Most goals in a season
Henrik Larsson (Celtic), 35 goals, 2000–01
Fastest goal
Kris Commons, 12.2 seconds, Celtic 4 - 3 Aberdeen, 16 March 2013
All-time top scorer
Kris Boyd (Kilmarnock and Rangers), 164 goals
Most hat-tricks
Henrik Larsson (Celtic), 12
Hat-tricks in consecutive games
Henrik Larsson (Celtic), 2000–01
Anthony Stokes (Falkirk), 2006–07
Most goals in a game
Kenny Miller, 5, Rangers v St Mirren, 4 November 2000
Kris Boyd, 5, Kilmarnock v Dundee United, 25 September 2004
Kris Boyd, 5, Rangers v Dundee United, 30 December 2009
Gary Hooper, 5, Celtic v Heart of Midlothian, 13 May 2012
Most consecutive clean sheets
Robert Douglas, Celtic, 7 games, 2000–01
Most clean sheets in a season
Fraser Forster and Łukasz Załuska, Celtic, 25 games, 2011–12
Most SPL appearances
James Fowler, 401 (correct to the end of the 2012–13 season)
Highest attendance
60,440, Celtic v St Mirren, 7 April 2001
Lowest attendance
431, Gretna v Inverness CT, 5 April 2008
Highest average attendance
59,369, Celtic, 2000–01
Lowest average attendance
2,283, Gretna, 2007–08
Highest transfer fee paid
Tore André Flo, from Chelsea to Rangers, £12 million, 23 November 2000
Highest transfer fee received
Aiden McGeady, from Celtic to Spartak Moscow, £9.5 million, 13 August 2010
Highest transfer fee between two SPL clubs
Scott Brown, from Hibernian to Celtic, £4.4 million, 1 June 2007

== See also ==
- List of attendance figures at domestic professional sports leagues
- Scottish Premier League monthly awards
