= 1893–94 Dundee F.C. season =

Dundee
1893–94 season
- Stadium: West Craigie Park (1893); Carolina Port (1894)
- Division One: 8th
- Top goalscorer: James Dundas (12)
Home colours	Alternate colours

Season 1893–94 was the first season in which Dundee competed at a Scottish national level, playing in Division One for the first time. Throughout the season, Dundee would alternate between the two kits of their merger clubs, Dundee East End (sky blue stripes) and Dundee Our Boys (all navy blue). Dundee would play the first half of their debut season at Our Boys' former ground, West Craigie Park, before moving to Carolina Port for the second half in 1894.

== Scottish Division One ==
Statistics provided by Dee Archive

Match Day	Date	Opponent	H/A	Score	Dundee Scorer(s)	Attendance
1	12 August	Rangers	H	3–3	Gilligan, Keillor, Dundas	5,000
2	19 August	Celtic	H	1–4	Longair	9,000
3	26 August	Renton	A	3–2	Dundas, Reid (2)	1,000
4	9 September	Leith Athletic	A	5–3	Dundas (2), Keillor, Reid, Gilligan	4,000
5	16 September	Dumbarton	A	1–1	Dundas	2,000
6	23 September	St Mirren	H	0–3		3,000
7	30 September	St Bernard's	H	1–3	Gilligan	2,000
8	14 October	Third Lanark	H	3–4	Ritchie (2), Gilligan	3,000
9	21 October	Heart of Midlothian	H	2–5	George, Petrie	5,000
10	1 November	Celtic	A	1–3	McInroy	3,000
11	11 November	Leith Athletic	H	4–3	McInroy, Craig, Dundas (2)	5,000
12	9 December	Dumbarton	H	4–0	Dundas (2), Keillor, Thomson	5,000
13	16 December	Heart of Midlothian	A	0–3		3,000
14	27 January	St Bernard's	A	5–3	Buttar, Thomson (2), Dundas, McInroy	
15	10 February	Renton	H	8–1	Dundas, Thomson, McInroy (2), Matthew, Keillor (2), Gilligan	4,000
16	17 February	St Mirren	A	3–10	McInroy, Matthew, Maxwell	
17	24 February	Third Lanark	H	1–1	Dundas	3,000
18	10 May	Rangers	A	2–7	Gilligan, Keillor	3,000

=== League table ===
Pos	Team	Pld	W	D	L	GF	GA	GD	Pts	Relegation
6	St Mirren	18	7	3	8	49	47	+2	17	
7	Third Lanark	18	7	3	8	38	44	−6	17	
8	Dundee	18	6	3	9	47	59	−12	15	
9	Leith Athletic	18	4	2	12	36	46	−10	10	
10	Renton (R)	18	1	2	15	23	57	−34	4	Relegated to the 1894–95 Scottish Division Two

Source: worldfootball.net, Scottish Professional Football League
Rules for classification: Points system: 2 points for a win, 1 point for a draw, 0 points for a loss.
(R) Relegated

== Player statistics ==
Only showing players with confirmed appearances

No.	Pos	Nat	Player	Total		First Division	
No.	Pos	Nat	Player	Apps	Goals	Apps	Goals
	GK	(Scotland) SCO	Frank Barrett	6	0	6	0
	DF	(Scotland) SCO	James Brown	13	0	13	0
	FW	(Scotland) SCO	Jim Buttar	1	1	1	1
	MF	(Scotland) SCO	George Campbell	5	0	5	0
	DF	(Scotland) SCO	Alex Craig	13	1	13	1
	MF	(Scotland) SCO	William Craik	1	0	1	0
	DF	(Scotland) SCO	John Dow	2	0	2	0
	MF	(Scotland) SCO	James Dundas	17	12	17	12
	DF	(Scotland) SCO	Bill Ferrier	17	0	17	0
	MF	(Scotland) SCO	Frank George	1	1	1	1
	FW	(Scotland) SCO	Sandy Gilligan	16	6	16	6
	MF	(Scotland) SCO	Bill Graham	1	0	1	0
	MF	(Scotland) SCO	Sandy Keillor	18	6	18	6
	MF	(Scotland) SCO	William Longair	17	1	17	1
	MF	(Scotland) SCO	Harry Matthew	8	2	8	2
	FW	(Scotland) SCO	William Maxwell	1	1	1	1
	FW	(Scotland) SCO	David McInroy	9	6	9	6
	GK	(Scotland) SCO	Bill McKie	10	0	10	0
	MF	(Scotland) SCO	George McNaughton	2	0	2	0
	MF	(Scotland) SCO	Bob Petrie	13	1	13	1
	GK	(Scotland) SCO	George Ramsay	2	0	2	0
	FW	(Scotland) SCO	George Reid	6	3	6	3
	FW	(Scotland) SCO	John Ritchie	2	2	2	2
	FW	(Scotland) SCO	Bill Thomson	17	4	17	4

== See also ==
- List of Dundee F.C. seasons
