= 1895–96 Dundee F.C. season =

Dundee
1895–96 season
- Stadium: Carolina Port
- Division One: 5th
- Scottish Cup: 2nd round
- Top goalscorer: League: Dave McDonald & Tom Lonie (6); All: McDonald, Lonie & Keillor (6)
Home colours

The 1895–96 season was the third season that Dundee competed at a Scotland national level, playing in Division One, finishing in 5th place. Dundee would also compete in the Scottish Cup.

== Scottish Division One ==
Statistics provided by Dee Archive

Match day	Date	Opponent	H/A	Score	Dundee scorer(s)	Attendance
1	10 August	Celtic	H	1–2	McDonald	10,000
2	17 August	St Bernard's	A	2–4	Dundas, Lonie	2,500
3	24 August	Dumbarton	H	4–1	Gilligan (2), Dundas (2)	2,000
4	31 August	Hibernian	H	2–2	Keillor, McGinn (o.g.)	6,000
5	7 September	Clyde	A	1–0	McDonald	5,000
6	14 September	Third Lanark	A	4–3	Lonie (4)	
7	21 September	St Mirren	H	1–1	Richardson	5,500
8	28 September	St Mirren	A	1–3	Lonie	5,000
9	5 October	St Bernard's	H	4–1	Vail, Dundas, McDonald, Sawers	6,000
10	12 October	Heart of Midlothian	H	5–0	McDonald (2), Thomson, Vail, Sawers	8,000
11	26 October	Celtic	A	0–11		10,000
12	2 November	Heart of Midlothian	A	0–2		7,000
13	23 November	Third Lanark	H	2–0	Longair, McDonald	2,000
14	16 March	Rangers	H	1–3	Keillor	2,000
15	7 December	Dumbarton	A	2–1	Vail, Thomson	500
16	14 December	Clyde	H	1–2	Gilligan	2,000
17	18 January	Hibernian	H	1–3	Vail	5,000
18	29 February	Rangers	A	1–3	Keillor	3,000

=== League table ===
Pos	Team	Pld	W	D	L	GF	GA	GD	Pts
3	Hibernian	18	11	2	5	58	39	+19	24
4	Heart of Midlothian	18	11	0	7	68	36	+32	22
5	Dundee	18	7	2	9	33	42	−9	16
6	St Bernard's	18	7	1	10	36	53	−17	15
6	Third Lanark	18	7	1	10	47	51	−4	15

Source: "1895-1896 Division 1 - SPFL Archive". SPFL.
Rules for classification: Teams finish equal if level on points. Points system: 2 points for a win, 1 point for a draw, 0 points for a loss

== Scottish Cup ==
Statistics provided by Dee Archive

Round	Date	Opponent	H/A	Score	Dundee scorer(s)	Attendance
1st round	11 January	Greenock Morton	A	3–2	Keillor (2), Richardson	3,000
2nd round	25 January	Third Lanark	A	1–4	Keillor	5,000

== Player statistics ==
Statistics provided by Dee Archive

No.	Pos	Nat	Player	Total		First Division		Scottish Cup	
No.	Pos	Nat	Player	Apps	Goals	Apps	Goals	Apps	Goals
	GK	(Scotland) SCO	Frank Barrett	19	0	17	0	2	0
	FW	(Scotland) SCO	Alex Black	1	0	1	0	0	0
	DF	(Scotland) SCO	Charlie Burgess	18	0	17	0	1	0
	GK	(Scotland) SCO	Bill Coventry	1	0	1	0	0	0
	DF	(Scotland) SCO	Charlie Craig	2	0	1	0	1	0
	DF	(Scotland) SCO	Johnny Darroch	20	0	18	0	2	0
	FW	(Scotland) SCO	Charles Dickson	5	1	5	1	0	0
	MF	(Scotland) SCO	James Dundas	20	4	18	4	2	0
	MF	(Scotland) SCO	Frank Ferrier	1	0	1	0	0	0
	FW	(Scotland) SCO	Willie Ford	2	0	2	0	0	0
	FW	(Scotland) SCO	Sandy Gilligan	14	4	12	3	2	1
	DF	(Scotland) SCO	Bill Hendry	18	0	16	0	2	0
	MF	(Scotland) SCO	Sandy Keillor	18	4	16	2	2	2
	MF	(Scotland) SCO	William Longair	18	1	16	1	2	0
	MF	(Scotland) SCO	Tom Lonie	7	5	7	5	0	0
	MF	(Scotland) SCO	John Low	1	0	1	0	0	0
	FW	(Scotland) SCO	David McDonald	14	6	12	6	2	0
	MF	(Scotland) SCO	George Philip	1	0	1	0	0	0
	FW	(Scotland) SCO	George Reid	1	0	1	0	0	0
	FW	(Scotland) SCO	William Richardson	5	2	3	1	2	1
	FW	(Scotland) SCO	Bill Sawers	9	3	9	3	0	0
	FW	(England) ENG	Wilf Toman	1	0	1	0	0	0
	FW	(Scotland) SCO	Tommy Vail	9	5	9	5	0	0

== See also ==
- List of Dundee F.C. seasons
