= 1894–95 Dundee F.C. season =

Dundee
1894–95 season
- Stadium: Carolina Port
- Division One: 8th
- Scottish Cup: Semi-finals
- Top goalscorer: League: Bill Sawers (7); All: Bill Sawers (8)
Home colours

The 1894–95 season was the second season in which Dundee competed at a Scottish national level, playing in Division One, finishing 8th place for the 2nd consecutive season. Dundee would also compete in the Scottish Cup for the first time in their history, making it to the semi-finals of the competition.

== Scottish Division One ==
Statistics provided by Dee Archive

Match day	Date	Opponent	H/A	Score	Dundee scorer(s)	Attendance
1	11 August	Celtic	H	1–1	Dickson	10,000
2	18 August	Clyde	H	4–1	Gilligan (2), Sawers (2)	5,000
3	1 September	Rangers	A	0–1		3,500
4	8 September	Dumbarton	H	3–0	Sawers, Gilligan, Fleming	5,000
5	15 September	St Mirren	A	1–5	Sawers	4,500
6	29 September	St Bernard's	H	2–2	Thomson	6,000
7	13 October	Dumbarton	A	4–2	Sawers, Fleming (2), Thomson	700
8	20 October	Leith Athletic	A	2–3	Sawers, McInroy	1,000
9	3 November	Third Lanark	H	1–2	Gilligan	3,000
10	1 December	Leith Athletic	H	4–1	Richardson, Keillor (2), Buttar	3,000
11	8 December	St Bernard's	A	0–2		1,000
12	22 December	Heart of Midlothian	H	0–2		4,000
13	26 January	Rangers	H	2–1	Gilligan, Sawers	6,000
14	16 March	St Mirren	H	0–1		3,000
15	30 March	Heart of Midlothian	A	0–4		4,000
16	27 April	Third Lanark	A	3–1	Smith (o.g.), Richardson, Lonie	2,000
17	4 May	Celtic	A	1–2	Lonie	5,000
18	18 May	Clyde	A	0–2		3,000

=== League table ===
Pos	Team	Pld	W	D	L	GF	GA	GD	Pts	Qualification or relegation
6	St Bernard's	18	8	1	9	37	40	−3	17	
7	Clyde	18	8	0	10	38	47	−9	16	
8	Dundee	18	6	2	10	28	33	−5	14	
9	Dumbarton	18	3	1	14	27	58	−31	7	
10	Leith Athletic (R)	18	3	1	14	32	64	−32	7	Relegated to the 1895–96 Scottish Division Two

Source: "1894-1895 Division 1 - SPFL Archive". SPFL.
Rules for classification: Teams finish equal if level on points. Points system: 2 points for a win, 1 point for a draw, 0 points for a loss
(R) Relegated

== Scottish Cup ==
Statistics provided by Dee Archive

Round	Date	Opponent	H/A	Score	Dundee scorer(s)	Attendance
1st round	24 November	Orion	H	5–1	Fleming, Thomson, Maxwell (3)	3,000
2nd round	15 December	St Mirren	H	2–0	Maxwell, Gilligan	3,000
3rd round	19 January	Celtic	H	1–0	Sawers	12,000
Semi-Final	16 February	Renton	H	1–1	Ritchie (o.g.)	7,500
SF Replay	23 February	Renton	N	3–3	Maxwell, Gilligan, McInroy	25,000
SF 2nd Replay	9 March	Renton	N	0–3		32,000

== Player statistics ==
No.	Pos	Nat	Player	Total		First Division		Scottish Cup	
No.	Pos	Nat	Player	Apps	Goals	Apps	Goals	Apps	Goals
	GK	(Scotland) SCO	Frank Barrett	24	0	18	0	6	0
	FW	(Scotland) SCO	Jim Buttar	6	1	6	1	0	0
	MF	(Scotland) SCO	George Campbell	16	0	13	0	3	0
	DF	(Scotland) SCO	Johnny Darroch	24	0	18	0	6	0
	FW	(Scotland) SCO	Charles Dickson	5	1	5	1	0	0
	DF	(Scotland) SCO	Sandy Drummond	2	0	2	0	0	0
	MF	(Scotland) SCO	James Dundas	22	1	16	1	6	0
	DF	(Scotland) SCO	Harry Erentz	1	0	0	0	1	0
	DF	(Scotland) SCO	Bill Ferrier	8	0	5	0	3	0
	MF	(Scotland) SCO	Billy Fleming	17	4	14	3	3	1
	FW	(Scotland) SCO	Sandy Gilligan	17	6	12	4	5	2
	MF	(Scotland) SCO	Sandy Keillor	24	2	18	2	6	0
	FW	(Scotland) SCO	James Logan	2	0	2	0	0	0
	MF	(Scotland) SCO	William Longair	23	0	17	0	6	0
	MF	(Scotland) SCO	Tom Lonie	3	2	3	2	0	0
	FW	(Scotland) SCO	William Maxwell	5	5	0	0	5	5
	FW	(Scotland) SCO	David McInroy	12	2	6	1	6	1
	MF	(Scotland) SCO	George Philip	2	0	2	0	0	0
	FW	(Scotland) SCO	William Richardson	11	2	11	2	0	0
	FW	(Scotland) SCO	Bill Sawers	19	8	14	7	5	1
	FW	(Scotland) SCO	Bert Shepard	1	0	1	0	0	0
	FW	(Scotland) SCO	Bill Thomson	20	4	15	3	5	1

== See also ==
- List of Dundee F.C. seasons
