= Gilligan (surname) =

Gilligan is a surname, and may refer to:

- Amy Archer-Gilligan (1873–1962), American serial killer and poisoner
- Andrew Gilligan, British journalist
- Arthur Gilligan, English cricketer
- Billy Gilligan, Scottish footballer
- Carol Gilligan, American feminist ethicist and psychologist
- Harold Gilligan, English cricketer
- James Gilligan, American psychiatrist and author
- Jim Gilligan (born 1946), American college baseball coach
- Jimmy Gilligan, former English footballer
- John Gilligan, several people
- Mo Gilligan, British comedian
- Ruth Gilligan (born 1988), Irish writer and actress
- Ryan Gilligan, English footballer
- Sam Gilligan, Scottish footballer
- Sandy Gilligan, Scottish footballer
- Shannon Gilligan, author of interactive fiction and computer games
- Sheri Gilligan (born 1963), American politician
- Thomas W. Gilligan, dean of the McCombs School of Business at the University of Texas—Austin
- Tim Gilligan, American football player
- Tom Gilligan (footballer, born 1978), Australian footballer
- Vince Gilligan, screenwriter, director and producer

Fictional characters named Gilligan include:

- Gilligan, a fictional character in the TV series Gilligan's Island
- Stewie Griffin, a fictional character in the TV series Family Guy, whose middle name is Gilligan
