= 1893–94 Celtic F.C. season =

Celtic
1893–94 season
- Stadium: Celtic Park
- Scottish First Division: 1st
- Scottish Cup: Finalists

1893–94 was the sixth season of football season for Celtic Football Club, which competed in the Scottish First Division.

They retained the league title they had won the previous year, their third major domestic honour ever. They also repeated as runners-up of the Scottish Cup, this time losing the final 3-1 to Rangers. It was the first time Celtic and Rangers, who would later go on to dominate Scottish football and be collectively known as the Old Firm, met in a Scottish Cup final.

== Competitions ==
=== Scottish First Division ===
==== League table ====
Pos	Team	Pld	W	D	L	GF	GA	GD	Pts	Relegation
1	Celtic (C)	18	14	1	3	53	32	+21	29	Champions
2	Heart of Midlothian	18	11	4	3	46	32	+14	26	
3	St Bernard's	18	11	1	6	53	39	+14	23	
4	Rangers	18	8	4	6	44	30	+14	20	
5	Dumbarton	18	7	5	6	32	35	−3	19	

Source: worldfootball.net, Scottish Professional Football League
Rules for classification: Points system: 2 points for a win, 1 point for a draw, 0 points for a loss.
(C) Champions

==== Matches ====
12 August 1893 First Division	Celtic	5–0	Third Lanark	Glasgow
				Stadium: Celtic Park; Attendance: 8,000

19 August 1893 First Division	Dundee	1–4	Celtic	Dundee
				Stadium: West Craigie Park; Attendance: 8,000

26 August 1893 First Division	Celtic	0–0	Dumbarton	Glasgow
				Stadium: Celtic Park; Attendance: 10,000

2 September 1893 First Division	Rangers	5–0	Celtic	Glasgow
				Stadium: Ibrox Park; Attendance: 15,500

9 September 1893 First Division	Hearts	2–4	Celtic	Edinburgh
				Stadium: Tynecastle Park; Attendance: 14,000

23 September 1893 First Division	Celtic	4–1	Leith Athletic	Glasgow
				Stadium: Celtic Park; Attendance: 6,500

30 September 1893 First Division	St Mirren	1–2	Celtic	Paisley
				Stadium: Westmarch; Attendance: 7,000

14 October 1893 First Division	Celtic	5–2	St Bernard's	Glasgow
				Stadium: Celtic Park; Attendance: 8,000

4 November 1893 First Division	Celtic	3–1	Dundee	Glasgow
				Stadium: Celtic Park; Attendance: 3,000

11 November 1893 First Division	Renton	0–3	Celtic	Renton
				Stadium: Tontine Park; Attendance: 4,000

2 December 1893 First Division	Celtic	3–2	Renton	Glasgow
				Stadium: Celtic Park; Attendance: 3,000

23 December 1893 First Division	Dumbarton	4–5	Celtic	Glasgow
				Stadium: Boghead Park; Attendance: 6,000

30 December 1893 First Division	Third Lanark	1–3	Celtic	Glasgow
				Stadium: Cathkin Park; Attendance: 12,000

20 January 1894 First Division	St Bernard's	1–2	Celtic	Edinburgh
				Stadium: New Logie Green; Attendance: 4,000

10 February 1894 First Division	Celtic	5–1	St Mirren	Glasgow
				Stadium: Celtic Park

24 February 1894 First Division	Celtic	3–2	Rangers	Glasgow
				Stadium: Celtic Park; Attendance: 8,000

10 March 1894 First Division	Celtic	2–3	Hearts	Glasgow
				Stadium: Celtic Park; Attendance: 7,000

17 March 1894 First Division	Leith Athletic	5–0	Celtic	Leith
				Stadium: Bank Park; Attendance: 6,500

=== Scottish Cup ===
25 November 1893 First round	Celtic	6–0	Hurlford	Glasgow
				Stadium: Celtic Park; Attendance: 2,000

16 December 1893 Second round	Celtic	7–0	Albion Rovers	Glasgow
				Stadium: Celtic Park; Attendance: 1,500

13 January 1894 Third round	Celtic	8–1	St Bernard's	Glasgow
				Stadium: Celtic Park; Attendance: 2,500

3 February 1894 Semi-final	Third Lanark	3–5	Celtic	Glasgow
				Stadium: Cathkin Park; Attendance: 12,000

17 February 1894 Final	Rangers	3–1	Celtic	Glasgow
				Stadium: Hampden Park; Attendance: 17,000
