= Gilligan (disambiguation) =

Gilligan is a fictional character played by Bob Denver on the 1960s TV show Gilligan's Island.

Gilligan may also refer to:

- USS Gilligan, a John C. Butler-class destroyer escort
- Gilligan (surname)
- "Gilligan" (Space Ghost Coast to Coast), an episode of Space Ghost Coast to Coast
- Gilligan, a variation of a mulligan in golf

== See also ==
- Gillig, American bus manufacturer
