= 1893–94 Heart of Midlothian F.C. season =

Heart of Midlothian
1893–94 season
- Stadium: Tynecastle Park
- Scottish First Division: 2nd
- Scottish Cup: 1st Round
- East of Scotland Shield: Winners

During the 1893–94 season Hearts competed in the Scottish First Division, the Scottish Cup and the East of Scotland Shield.

== Fixtures ==
=== East of Scotland Shield ===
30 December 1893 East of Scotland Shield R1	Hibernian	2–2	Hearts	Easter Road

6 January 1894 East of Scotland Shield R1 Replay	Hearts	3–2	Hibernian	Tynecastle Park

20 January 1894 East of Scotland Shield SF	Mossend Swifts	0–2	Hearts	Mossend Park

12 May 1894 East of Scotland Shield Final	Hearts	4–2	Leith Athletic	Tynecastle Park

=== Rosebery Charity Cup ===
30 April 1894 Rosebery Charity Cup SF	Hearts	2–2	Leith Athletic	New Logie Green

21 May 1894 Rosebery Charity Cup SF Replay	Leith Athletic	1–2	Hearts	Bank Park

31 May 1894 Rosebery Charity Cup Final	Hibernian	4–2	Hearts	Easter Road

=== Scottish Cup ===
24 November 1893 Scottish Cup R1	St Mirren	1–0	Hearts	Westmarch Park
				Attendance: 6,000

=== Scottish First Division ===
19 August 1893 Scottish First Division	Hearts	0–2	Leith Athletic	Tynecastle Park
				Attendance: 7,000

26 August 1893 Scottish First Division	St Mirren	2–3	Hearts	Westmarch Park
				Attendance: 4,000

2 September 1893 Scottish First Division	Third Lanark	1–2	Hearts	Cathkin Park
				Attendance: 5,000

9 September 1893 Scottish First Division	Hearts	2–4	Celtic	Tynecastle Park
				Attendance: 14,000

23 September 1893 Scottish First Division	Hearts	2–2	Third Lanark	Tynecastle Park
				Attendance: 3,500

30 September 1893 Scottish First Division	Dumbarton	2–2	Hearts	Boghead Park
				Attendance: 1,000

7 October 1893 Scottish First Division	St Bernard's	1–2	Hearts	New Logie Green
				Attendance: 12,000

14 October 1893 Scottish First Division	Hearts	4–2	Rangers	Tynecastle Park
				Attendance: 7,500

21 October 1893 Scottish First Division	Dundee	2–5	Hearts	West Craigie Park
				Attendance: 5,500

4 November 1893 Scottish First Division	Renton	2–3	Hearts	Tontine Park
				Attendance: 2,000

18 November 1893 Scottish First Division	Hearts	1–1	St Mirren	Tynecastle Park
				Attendance: 3,000

2 December 1893 Scottish First Division	Leith Athletic	2–2	Hearts	Bank Park
				Attendance: 4,000

16 December 1893 Scottish First Division	Hearts	3–0	Dundee	Tynecastle Park
				Attendance: 3,000

3 March 1894 Scottish First Division	Hearts	5–1	Renton	Tynecastle Park
				Attendance: 2,500

10 March 1894 Scottish First Division	Celtic	2–3	Hearts	Celtic Park
				Attendance: 7,000

7 April 1894 Scottish First Division	Hearts	2–4	St Bernard's	Tynecastle Park
				Attendance: 4,500

14 April 1894 Scottish First Division	Rangers	1–2	Hearts	Ibrox Park
				Attendance: 4,000

28 April 1894 Scottish First Division	Hearts	2–1	Dumbarton	Tynecastle Park
				Attendance: 4,000

== See also ==
- List of Heart of Midlothian F.C. seasons
