= Montrose F.C. =

Association football club in Montrose, Angus, Scotland

Montrose
- Full name: Montrose Football Club
- Nicknames: The Gable Endies; Links Park Dynamo; The Mo
- Founded: 13 October 1879; 147 years ago
- Ground: Links Park, Montrose
- Capacity: 4,936
- Coordinates: 56.714003°N 2.458956°W
- Chairman: Peter Stuart
- Manager: Stewart Petrie
- League: Scottish League One
- 2025–26: Scottish League One, 6th of 10
- Website: montrosefc.co.uk
Home colours	Away colours

Montrose Football Club is a Scottish semi-professional football team, based in the town of Montrose, Angus. The club was founded in 1879. They are members of the Scottish Professional Football League and currently play in Scottish League One, the third tier of football in Scotland.

== History ==
=== Early years ===
The first Montrose Football Club was formed on 25 February 1871 after a meeting of local young men seeking to organise the practice of the 'national game of football' on the Links of Montrose. The variety of football played at the time did not resemble the modern game and was more akin to rugby. Friendly matches amongst club members and townsfolk, Montrose Academical, Arbroath and Aberdeen University were played over the next few years before the club was dissolved. On 8 September 1877, a new football club was formed at a meeting at Montrose Academy.

During the new club's annual meeting on 13 October 1879 at the Town's Buildings, the committee unanimously resolved to change the rules of the club to those of General Association, with an association rules match amongst club members played later that week on 18 October 1879.

The club played their first external association rules match against Arbroath Wanderers on 8 November 1879. Given the fact that the Montrose side were unfamiliar with new rules of the game, the team unsurprisingly lost 4–0. They are the 18th oldest association football team in Scotland still in existence.

Montrose first played on the Links before eventually moving to the first Links Park, which was situated to the east of Dorward House. The original Links Park was not considered to be suitable for football and the club moved to the present-day Links Park in 1887 on land rented from the 'Auld Kirk'.

Montrose made their Scottish Cup debut in 1887 with a 5–7 win away to Broughty. By 1890, Montrose had one of the stronger teams in the Scottish game. In the intervening years since the club's formation, they had beaten Aberdeen and played several teams from the West of Scotland such as Dumbarton, Third Lanark Volunteers and Glasgow Thistle.

In 1891, Alex 'Sandy' Keillor became the first Montrose player to receive a Scotland cap in a call-up for their win against Wales in Wrexham. Keillor received one more cap during his time at Montrose, scoring the opening goal in a 3–2 victory over Ireland in Belfast during the 1891–92 British Home Championship. Fellow 'Gable Endie' George Bowman was also capped in that match. To this day, Bowman and Keillor remain the only players to be selected for Scotland whilst playing for Montrose.

George Bowman also captained Montrose to their first piece of silverware, the Forfarshire Cup, with a 5–3 win over Dundee East End in the 1892 final at West Craigie Park.

In 1921, Montrose won the Scottish Qualifying Cup after defeating Nithsdale Wanderers 2–1 in the second replay of the final at Ibrox.

They joined the Scottish Football League in 1923, along with near-neighbours Brechin City, in the newly founded Third Division. In 1923–24 they achieved a creditable fourth-placed finish. However, the following season Montrose finished at the bottom of the table, and despite signs of a recovery in 1925–26, lost their league place when the Third Division was scrapped owing to the financial difficulties experienced by many of the member clubs. Montrose are one of only two teams from the sixteen teams in the 1925–26 Third Division who are still competing today in the SPFL.

The club was re-admitted to the Second Division in 1929–30. In the 1930s, the first few league seasons after re-admission were difficult, with the club regularly finishing in the bottom four of the table. Montrose did however reach the quarter-finals of the 1929–30 Scottish Cup, drawn away to eventual winners Rangers. Perhaps the best result of that difficult decade came in the 1938–39 Scottish Cup, when in the first round, Montrose sensationally knocked out holders East Fife by a 2–1 scoreline at Bayview Park.

=== Post-war period ===
In the immediate postwar period, Montrose spent time playing in the newly formed Division C, consisting of provincial clubs and some first division reserve sides. In the 1947–48 Scottish Cup Montrose played Celtic at Celtic Park in the quarter-finals, losing 4–0. With the re-formation of the Second Division in 1955–56, the club once again joined that league.

=== Halcyon days ===
Chart of yearly table positions of Montrose. (Note: Break in graph between 1925–26 and 1929–30 due to the dissolving of Scottish Division Three and between 1938–39 and 1946–47 due to World War II.)

The club's halcyon period was the mid-1970s when, under player-manager Alex Stuart, Montrose reached third place in the old First Division, and were a feared and respected cup side, notably reaching the semi-final of the 1975–76 Scottish League Cup and the quarter-finals of the Scottish Cup in 1972–73 and 1975–76 - to this day their best performances in both respective cups. In the second round of 1974–75 Scottish Cup, Montrose recorded their largest victory in modern times when they beat Vale of Leithen 12–0. Although this was an "away" fixture, due to a fire at their opposition's ground this tie was played at Links Park. In the 1975–76 Scottish Cup quarter-final, Montrose were only 90 seconds away from a famous victory in front of over 8,000 spectators at Links Park against Hearts, until an injury time equaliser from Graham Shaw sent the match to a replay. If Montrose had beaten Hearts, they would have potentially earned a match-up against Lokomotive Leipzig in the 1976–77 European Cup Winners' Cup as probable Scottish Cup runners-up.

Montrose won their first championship under the guidance of Iain Stewart in 1984–85, as they triumphed in the old Second Division. Relegation followed in 1987 as the part-time club found themselves outgunned in a league largely consisting of full-time teams.

=== The 1990s ===
Under co-managers Doug Rougvie and Chic McLelland, Montrose won promotion to Division One in 1991, after finishing as runners-up to Stirling Albion, but were relegated after one further season in the higher league.

Montrose have spent the vast majority of their recent history in the relative obscurity of the Third Division. At the end of the 1994–95 season, they were promoted to the Second Division after finishing second behind champions Forfar Athletic. However, the team's first attempt at this higher level was not successful, as they finished bottom of the table in 1995–96.

=== 21st century ===
In the second round of the 2003–04 League Cup, Montrose were drawn away to SPL side Hibernian where they were crushed 9–0.

Following a disappointing beginning to 2005–06 season, manager Henry Hall left the club by mutual consent, shortly followed by assistant Ian Gilzean. Former Montrose player Eddie Wolecki was appointed new manager of the team on 12 December 2005. In July 2006 Aberdeen businessman Kenny Black invested money in the club and was offered a place on the board which he accepted. David Robertson (ex Aberdeen, Rangers and Leeds United player) became co-manager with Wolecki, but the latter parted company with the club in September 2006. Following a very poor run of results David Robertson left the club in early 2007, replaced in time by ex-St Johnstone stalwart Jim Weir, assisted by experienced defender Kevin McGowne.

Links Park underwent a transformation ahead of the 2007–08 campaign. A new artificial pitch was laid, so the game on 21 April 2007 was the last game on grass for the foreseeable future. A smaller training pitch was installed beside the main stand. New state of the art catering facilities and changing rooms were also installed. The fortunes of the club on the pitch also improved with several big name signings and a great start to the season propelled Montrose into the top four for the majority of the season. Montrose came in third in the league and were pitted against Stranraer in the Second Division playoffs. A 1–1 draw in the first leg at Links Park, was followed by a second leg in which Montrose went down 3–0. They were thus confined to the Third Division for yet another season.

The 2008–09 pre-season was very quiet and few new signings were made; rumblings of discontent and rumours of behind the scenes fighting were proved to be true as boss Jim Weir was sacked by the Board after a 2–1 defeat to Cowdenbeath with six months still to run on his contract. U17's boss Steve Adam took the reins before ex-Dundee United and Celtic defender David Hannah became caretaker boss. Hannah left the club in mid-December after a poor defeat to Cowdenbeath. During this game, fans made their feelings felt after Hannah threatened a fan and criticised the away support from the previous week after the dreadful 5–0 defeat away at East Stirlingshire. Director of Football Kenny Black took the reins over the Christmas period until Montrose appointed Steven Tweed as player-manager. During January many of the players from Jim Weir's reign were shipped out and a number of new loanees appeared. Things began to gel and Montrose won six out of their last nine games with a smaller, much younger squad who narrowly missed out on the playoffs.

The 2009–10 season began terribly for the Montrose faithful, with the team failing to win any Division Three matches at all up to 16 January. However, the club reached the 2009–10 Scottish Cup fifth round, where they were defeated by Hibernian at Easter Road. On 10 April, Brian Winton stepped down as chairman. The club finished bottom of the Third Division for the first time in eleven years.

2011 saw Steven Tweed finally step down due to work commitments with the RBS. Ray Farningham & Stuart Garden were given the job of leading the team till the end of the season however the board moved quickly to secure the pair on two year contracts. In the final game of the season popular player Hugh Davidson chose to retire from the game.

During the 2012–13 season, Montrose faced Rangers four times in the league due to the latter's financial troubles and subsequent placement into the Scottish Third Division. Montrose managed to draw both home and away matches against the Glasgow team but lost the other two encounters. The home games attracted crowds of over 4,500 at Links Park. Notably, Montrose's 4–2 home defeat against Rangers was televised on ESPN, marking the first live televised match for Montrose.

At the end of the 2014–15 season, Montrose came last in League Two, and, due to the reform of the Scottish football league system, they had to play against Highland Football League champions Brora Rangers (who were the winner in the semi-final) in the League Two play-off. They maintained their status in the SPFL after a 3–2 aggregate win, with two goals in the second half of the home leg by Marvin Andrews and Gary Wood saved the club from dropping into non-league football.

=== Stewart Petrie era ===
Stewart Petrie was appointed manager in December 2016 after the sacking of Paul Hegarty a month earlier due to a run of poor performances, which led to the club sitting bottom of League Two. The appointment of Petrie vastly improved the fortunes of the team, achieving a 4th-place finish at the end of season and qualification for the League One playoffs for the first time in nine years. Montrose ended up losing 4–1 on aggregate to Peterhead in the playoff semi-final.

The 2017–18 season was more notable for altogether happier reasons. Montrose were promoted as League Two champions finishing one point ahead of Peterhead, who had pushed them all the way to the last game. This saw Montrose end 22 consecutive seasons in Scotland's fourth tier.

After promotion, Petrie continued to steer the club in a favourable direction in League One, achieving top four finishes and Championship playoff spots for four consecutive seasons. Montrose also reached the round of 16 of the 2020–21 Scottish Cup, their best performance in over a decade, losing to Kilmarnock 3–1 at Rugby Park in the fourth round. Their third-place finish in the 2021–22 League One season was the highest for the club in the Scottish football league system since their 12th-place finish in the 1985–86 old First Division.

During the 2023–24 season, Montrose had three matches televised live on BBC Alba, including a 3–2 win over Queen of the South at Palmerston Park.

== Rivalries ==
Montrose share a strong rivalry with local side Arbroath, and matches between the two are usually intense and widely anticipated by both sides. Montrose also share local rivalries with fellow Angus sides Brechin City and Forfar Athletic, with games played by two of any of these teams (including Arbroath) being known as Angus derbies.

== First-team squad ==
As of 4 September 2026

Note: Flags indicate national team as defined under FIFA eligibility rules; some limited exceptions apply. Players may hold more than one non-FIFA nationality.

No.	Pos.	Nation	Player
1	GK	SCO	Cammy Gill
2	DF	SCO	Ryan Williamson
3	DF	SCO	Flynn Duffy
4	DF	SCO	Aidan Quinn (captain)
5	DF	IRL	Sean McGinty
6	MF	SCO	Shaun Byrne
7	MF	SCO	Graham Webster (vice-captain)
8	MF	SCO	Jamie Barjonas
9	FW	SCO	Ewan Loudon
10	MF	SCO	Declan Glass
11	MF	SCO	Blair Lyons

No.	Pos.	Nation	Player
12	DF	SCO	Kieran Freeman
14	DF	IRL	Seán Dillon
15	DF	SCO	Charley Oosenbrugh (co-operation loan with Dundee)
16	FW	SCO	Jake Sutherland (on loan from Dunfermline Athletic)
18	MF	SCO	Andrew Mochrie
19	FW	SCO	Gary Oliver
20	DF	SCO	Keir Bertie
21	GK	SCO	Campbell Millar
22	MF	SCO	Harry Craig
24	DF	SCO	Archie Clelland

=== On loan ===
Note: Flags indicate national team as defined under FIFA eligibility rules; some limited exceptions apply. Players may hold more than one non-FIFA nationality.

No.	Pos.	Nation	Player
—	DF	SCO	Fraser Donaldson (co-operation loan with Lochee United)
—	MF	SCO	Rory Barclay (on loan at Montrose Roselea)

No.	Pos.	Nation	Player
—	FW	SCO	Kyle McClements (co-operation loan with Lochee United)

== Club officials ==
=== Executive ===
- Chairman: Peter Stuart
- Vice-chairman: Michael Fotheringham
- Club secretary: Brian Petrie
- Finance director: Iain Bridges
- Directors: Mark Clark, John Crawford, Barry O'Neill, Andy Stirling
- Associate directors: Andrew Stephen, Tracy Park, Ross Thomson
- Honorary president: John F. Paton
- Honorary vice-president: Malcolm Watters
- Honorary treasurer: Tom Murray

=== Coaching staff ===
- Manager: Stewart Petrie
- Assistant manager: Ross Campbell
- First-team coach: Seán Dillon
- Goalkeeping coach: David Larter
- Club doctor: Gareth Strachan
- Chartered physiotherapist: Gemma Collier
- Sports scientist: Chris Simpson
- Sports therapist: Scott Shepherd
- Kitmen: Robert Ogg, Neill McIntosh

== Honours ==
=== League ===
- Scottish Football League Second Division (third tier):
  - Winners: 1984–85
  - Runners-up: 1990–91
- Scottish Football League Third Division / Scottish League Two (fourth tier):
  - Winners: 2017–18
  - Runners-up: 1994–95
- Northern League
  - Winners: 1903–04
  - Runners-up: 1891–92
- Forfarshire County League (Carry Cup)
  - Winners: 1894–95, 1910–11
  - Runners-up: 1897–98

=== Cup ===
- Scottish Qualifying Cup:
  - Winners: 1921
- Scottish Qualifying Cup Midlands:
  - Winners: 1947
- Scottish Qualifying Cup South:
  - Runners-up: 1948
- Forfarshire Cup:
  - Winners (10): 1891–92, 1921–22, 1926–27, 1931–32, 1932–33, 1951–52, 1961–62, 1972–73, 1991–92, 2001–02
  - Runners-up: 1902–03, 1903–04, 1907–08, 1912–13, 1929–30, 1935–36, 1954–55, 1986–87, 2002–03, 2007–08
- Forfarshire Charity Cup:
  - Winners: 1892–93, 1894–95, 1896–97
  - Runners-up: 1888–89, 1889–90

== Club records ==
- Best league position: 3rd in First Division, 1975–76
- Best Scottish Cup performance: Quarter-finals, 1929–30, 1947–48, 1972–73, 1975–76
- Best League Cup performance: Semi-finals, 1975–76
- Record home attendance: 8,983 v Dundee, Scottish Cup Quarter-final, 17 March 1973.
- Biggest victory: 18–2 v Dundee Hibernian, Forfar County League, 11 May 1895
- Heaviest defeat: 13–0 v Aberdeen 'A', Scottish Division C, 17 March 1951
- Most appearances: 503, Terry Masson, 2010–2026
- Most goals: 165, Bobby Livingstone
- Most goals in a single season: 33, Brian Third, 1972–73
- Most capped player: Alex Keillor, 2 caps for Scotland
- Record transfer fee paid: £25,000 to Elgin City for Kane Hester, May 2023
- Record transfer fee received: £50,000 from Hibernian for Gary Murray, December 1980

=== International club friendlies ===
1 Aug 1970 Friendly	Scunthorpe United (England)	2–0	(Scotland) Montrose	Scunthorpe, England
				Stadium: Old Show Ground

3 Aug 1970 Friendly	Halifax Town (England)	2–0	(Scotland) Montrose	Halifax, England
				Stadium: The Shay

4 Aug 1970 Friendly	Barnsley (England)	2–2	(Scotland) Montrose	Barnsley, England
				Stadium: Oakwell

5 Aug 1977 Friendly	Montrose (Scotland)	0–1	(Socialist Federal Republic of Yugoslavia) OFK Kikinda	Montrose, Scotland
			Plenic 88'	Stadium: Links Park
Note: OFK Kikinda Scottish Tour; First and only continental side to play at Links Park

26 Sep 1979 Friendly	Montrose (Scotland)	4–1	(England) Bristol Rovers	Montrose, Scotland
	Oliver 17'; England OG' 28'; Murray 32', 59'		Dennehy 22'	Stadium: Links Park; Attendance: 800; Referee: A.C. Harris
Note: Centenary Match

1 Aug 1979 Friendly	Montrose (Scotland)	1–1	(England) Wigan Athletic	Montrose, Scotland
				Stadium: Links Park

29 July 1980 Friendly	Montrose (Scotland)	0–1	(Wales) Cardiff City	Montrose, Scotland
				Stadium: Links Park

27 July 1990 Friendly	Altrincham (England)	1–2	(Scotland) Montrose	Altrincham, England
			Rougvie 27'; Trialist	Stadium: Moss Lane
Note: North England Tour

28 July 1990 Friendly	Northwich Victoria (England)	2–0	(Scotland) Montrose	Northwich, England
				Stadium: Drill Field
Note: North England Tour

4 Sept 1990 Friendly	Montrose (Scotland)	0–1	(United States) Dartmouth Big Green	Montrose, Scotland
			Clark	Stadium: Links Park
Note: Dartmouth 1990 Scottish Tour

24 July 1992 Friendly	Rochdale (England)	0–0	(Scotland) Montrose	Durham, England
				Stadium: Ferens Park
Note: English Tour

25 July 1992 Friendly	Whitley Bay (England)	1–2	(Scotland) Montrose	Durham, England
	Carver		Taylor OG'; Craib	Stadium: Ferens Park
Note: English Tour

24 July 1993 Friendly	Barrow (England)	1–3	(Scotland) Montrose	Barrow-in-Furness, England
				Stadium: Holker Street

22 July 1994 Friendly	Harrogate Town (England)	4–3	(Scotland) Montrose	Harrogate, England
			Kennedy; Harrogate Player OG'	Stadium: Wetherby Road
Note: Yorkshire Tour

24 July 1994 Friendly	Farsley Celtic (England)	1–4	(Scotland) Montrose	Farsley, England
			McGlashan; Masson; Kennedy	Stadium: Throstle Nest
Note: Yorkshire Tour

31 July 1995 Friendly	Montrose (Scotland)	0–3	(England) Portsmouth	Montrose, Scotland
			Burton; Creaney	Stadium: Links Park

18 July 1998 Friendly	Montrose (Scotland)	0–3	(England) Preston North End	Montrose, Scotland
				Stadium: Links Park
Note: Montrose FC Tournament Semi-Final

21 July 2001 Friendly	Montrose (Scotland)	0–1	(England) Plymouth Argyle	Montrose, Scotland
		Report	Wills	Stadium: Links Park
Note: 2001 Plymouth Argyle Scottish Pre-Season Tour

22 July 2002 Friendly	Montrose (Scotland)	1–2	(England) Plymouth Argyle	Montrose, Scotland
		Report	Lowndes; Taylor	Stadium: Links Park; Attendance: 374
Note: 2002 Plymouth Argyle Scottish Pre-Season Tour

== Notable players ==
=== International capped players ===
Bold denotes player still actively playing international football.

Player	Country	Caps whilst at Montrose
Aaron Taylor-Sinclair	Antigua and Barbuda	0
**Martin Boyle**	Australia	0
John McDonald	Australia	0
Jimmy Rooney	Australia	0
Kangana Ndiwa	(Democratic Republic of the Congo) DR Congo	0
Billy Hogg	England	0
**Jesse Curran**	Philippines	0
Cammy Bell	Scotland	0
George Bowman	Scotland	1
Jimmy Campbell	Scotland	0
Ned Doig	Scotland	0
Craig Forsyth	Scotland	0
Ian Gardiner	Scotland	0
John Gilmour	Scotland	0
**Luke Graham**	Scotland	0
Alex Keillor	Scotland	2
Andy Love	Scotland	0
Wilf Low	Scotland	0
Allan McClory	Scotland	0
David Robertson	Scotland	0
Doug Rougvie	Scotland	0
Benny Yorston	Scotland	0
Marvin Andrews	Trinidad and Tobago	0

In November 2022, former Montrose forward Martin Boyle was named in the Australia squad for the 2022 FIFA World Cup. He is the third former Montrose player to have been included in a World Cup squad, after Jimmy Rooney (Australia, 1974) and Marvin Andrews (Trinidad and Tobago, 2006). However, both Boyle and Andrews sustained injuries prior to their respective tournaments, meaning Rooney remains the only former Montrose player to have played in a FIFA World Cup. Rooney featured in all three of Australia's matches at the 1974 tournament in West Germany.

The most recent former Montrose player to receive an international call-up is Luke Graham, who made his Scotland debut in October 2026 in a UEFA Nations League match against North Macedonia, just over two years after his loan spell at Links Park.

=== Other notable players ===
Bold denotes player still actively playing with the club. Those in italics are inductees in the Montrose Hall of Fame.

- (Scotland) Martin Allan
- (Scotland) Les Barr
- (Netherlands) Ivo den Bieman
- (Scotland) Dennis D'Arcy
- (Scotland) Hugh Davidson
- (Republic of Ireland) **Seán Dillon**
- (Scotland) Neil Forbes
- (Scotland) Charlie Guthrie
- (Scotland) Harry Johnston
- (Scotland) Jimmy Kemp
- (Scotland) Steve King
- (Scotland) David Larter
- (Scotland) Bobby Livingstone
- (Scotland) Innes MacDonald
- (Scotland) Terry Masson
- (Scotland) Colin Maver
- (Scotland) Colin McGlashan
- (Scotland) Chic McLelland
- (Scotland) Bruce Morrison
- (Scotland) Willie Nicoll
- (Scotland) Gary Murray
- (Scotland) John Sheran
- (Scotland) Andrew Steeves
- (Scotland) Ian Stewart
- (Scotland) Alex Stuart
- (Scotland) Brian Third
- (Scotland) Gordon Wallace
- (Scotland) Paul Watson
- (Scotland) **Graham Webster**
- (Scotland) Garry Wood
