= John Gilligan =

John or Jack Gilligan may refer to:

- John Gilligan (criminal) (born 1952), Irish criminal
- John J. Gilligan (1921–2013), Governor of Ohio
- John Gilligan (footballer, born 1957), footballer for Swindon Town and Sligo
- John Gilligan (footballer, born 1884) (1884–1946), Scottish footballer for Clyde
- John Gilligan (mayor), independent councilor and former mayor of Limerick, 2008–2009
- John Gilligan (hurler), Irish hurler and footballer
- John Joseph Gilligan Jr. (1923–1942), United States Marine
- Jack Gilligan (baseball) (1885–1980), Major League Baseball pitcher
