= George Bowman =

George Bowman may refer to:

- George Bowman (Australian politician) (1795–1878), pastoralist and politician in the colony of New South Wales
- George Bowman (footballer) (1872–?), Scottish footballer
- George Bowman (pioneer) (1699–1768), American pioneer, landowner and Indian fighter
- George Bowman (Zen master), Zen Buddhist monk and psychotherapist
- George Bowman (baseball) (1883–1958), American baseball player
- George A. Bowman (1890–1957), Wisconsin State Assemblyman
- George S. Bowman Jr. (1911–2005), United States Marine Corps aviator
- George Bowman, 2nd Baronet (1923–1990) of the Bowman baronets of the United Kingdom

== See also ==
- Bowman (disambiguation)
