= Alex Keillor =

Scottish footballer

Sandy Keillor
Personal information
- Full name: Alexander Lowson Keillor
- Date of birth: 20 October 1869
- Place of birth: Dundee, Scotland
- Date of death: 16 June 1960 (aged 90)
- Position: Outside left

Youth career
- 1881–1884: Montrose Academy

Senior career*
Years	Team	Apps	(Gls)
1884–1893	Montrose		
1893–1902	Dundee	140	(13)
1902–1906	Montrose		

International career
1891–1897	Scotland	6	(2)
1897	Scottish League XI	1	(0)
- * Club domestic league appearances and goals

Alexander Lowson Keillor (20 October 1869 – 16 June 1960) was a Scottish footballer, who played for Montrose, Dundee and Scotland, being capped six times between 1891 and 1897.

Born in Dundee, Keillor is one of only two men to be selected for Scotland while playing for Montrose, alongside George Bowman who was a teammate in 1892. Keillor joined Dundee at the club's inception in 1893, and would set a number of firsts for the club during his lengthy stint there. He would play in Dundee's first ever competitive match in a league game against Rangers on 12 August 1893, was among the first Dundee players (alongside fellow Dees Frank Barrett and William Longair) to be capped by Scotland in 1894, and was the first Dundee player to score for Scotland in 1896.
