= Bobby Livingstone =

Scottish footballer and manager

Bobby Livingstone is a Scottish former association football player and manager, who is mainly associated with Montrose F.C. He made 351 appearances and scored 130 goals in the Scottish Football League for Montrose, and managed the club between 1979 and 1982. He resigned in April 1982 and was replaced by Stevie Murray.
