= USS Valor (AMc-108) =

Minesweeper of the United States Navy

Coordinates: 41°28′N 70°57′W

History

United States
- Name: USS Valor
- Builder: Snow Shipyards, Inc.
- Laid down: 27 May 1941
- Launched: 8 November 1941
- Commissioned: 24 March 1942
- Fate: Accidentally rammed and sunk, 29 June 1944
- Stricken: 14 October 1944

General characteristics
- Class & type: Accentor-class minesweeper
- Displacement: 303 long tons (308 t)
- Length: 98 ft 5 in (30.00 m)
- Beam: 23 ft 6 in (7.16 m)
- Draft: 10 ft 8 in (3.25 m)
- Propulsion: 1 × Fairbanks-Morse 35F14 diesel engine, 450 bhp (336 kW), 1 shaft
- Speed: 10 knots (19 km/h; 12 mph)
- Complement: 17 officers and enlisted men
- Armament: 2 × .50 cal (12.7 mm) machine guns

USS Valor (AMc-108) was an Accentor-class minesweeper built for the United States Navy during World War II. She was the first U.S. Naval vessel to bear the name.

Valor was laid down on 27 May 1941 at Rockland, Maine by the Snow Shipyards, Inc.; launched on 8 November 1941; co-sponsored by Misses Jane and Noreen Brannan; and placed in service on 24 March 1942 at the Boston Navy Yard.

Although records are sketchy and inconclusive, the coastal minesweeper appears to have operated in the waters of the 1st Naval District, primarily out of Boston, throughout her brief career. She also served for some time out of the Woods Hole Section Base.

She was attached to the Northern Group, Eastern Sea Frontier, at the time of her loss on 29 June 1944. Late that day, she was patrolling the southern approaches to the Cape Cod Canal, alert to the possible presence of enemy intruders on this highly traveled coastal route. Minutes before 22:00, as she patrolled north of Cuttyhunk Island in Buzzards Bay, Valor was struck by USS Richard W. Suesens. Within three minutes, the small ship sank in the shallow waters off Mishaum Point at the western entrance of Buzzard's Bay. The destroyer escort rescued seven survivors; but, although five other vessels joined in the search which continued until sunrise, the seven remaining men on board were never found. The following day, the survivors were transferred to facilities at the Naval Operating Base, Newport, Rhode Island.

Salvage operations began the day after the collision. On 14 October, her name was struck from the Naval Vessel Register. In January 1945 her hull was sold to the Newport Shipyard, Inc.

== See also ==
- List of United States Navy losses in World War II
