= USS Richard W. Suesens =

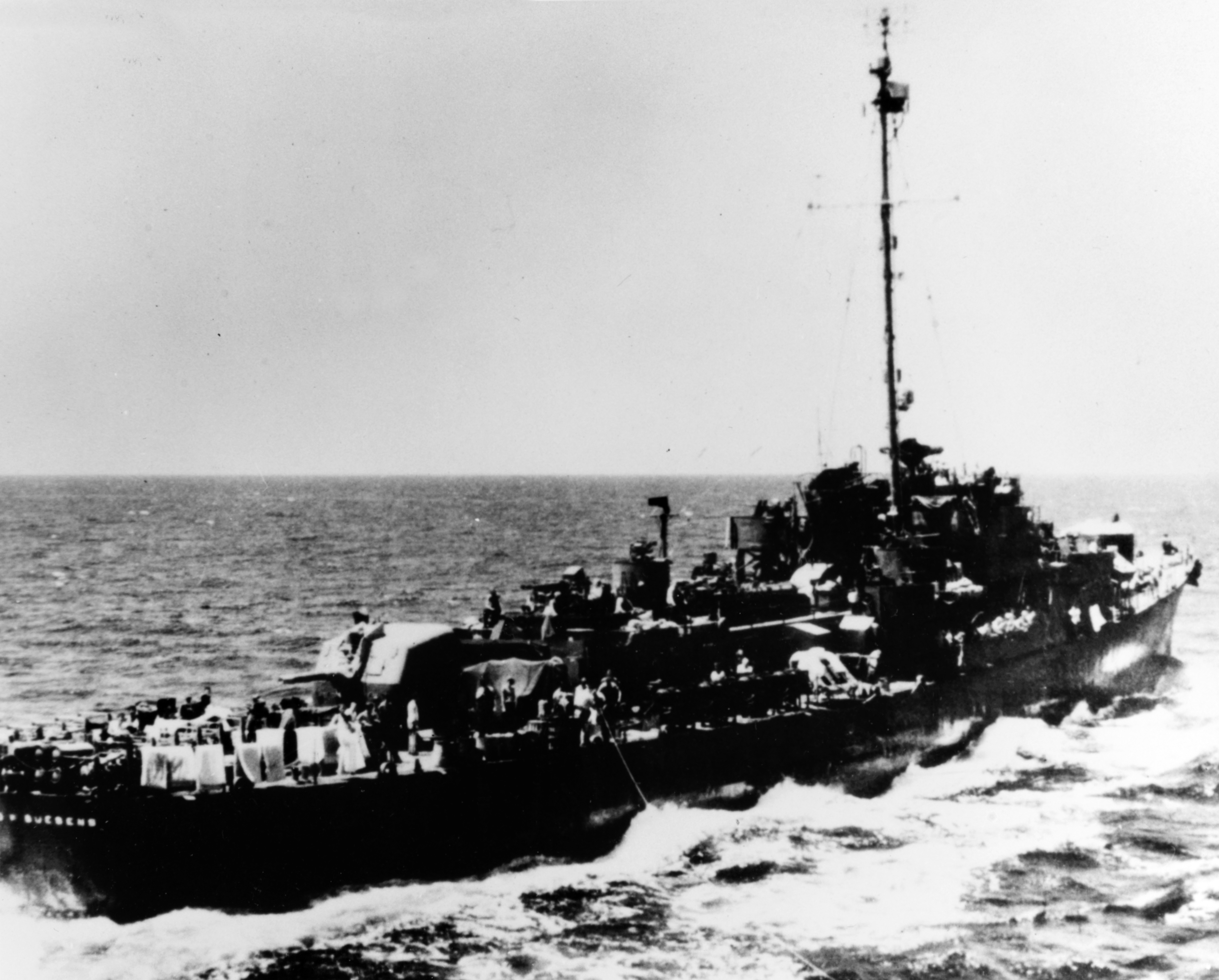
- USS Richard W. Suesens underway c. 1945

History

United States
- Name: Richard W. Suesens
- Namesake: Richard Wayne Suesens
- Builder: Consolidated Steel Corporation, Orange, Texas
- Laid down: 1 November 1943
- Launched: 11 January 1944
- Commissioned: 26 April 1944
- Decommissioned: 15 January 1947
- Stricken: 15 March 1972
- Identification: DE-342
- Fate: Sold for scrap 13 June 1973

General characteristics
- Class & type: John C. Butler-class destroyer escort
- Displacement: 1,350 long tons (1,372 t)
- Length: 306 ft (93 m)
- Beam: 36 ft 8 in (11.18 m)
- Draft: 9 ft 5 in (2.87 m)
- Propulsion: 2 boilers, 2 geared turbine engines, 12,000 shp (8,900 kW); 2 propellers
- Speed: 24 knots (44 km/h; 28 mph)
- Range: 6,000 nmi (11,000 km; 6,900 mi) at 12 kn (22 km/h; 14 mph)
- Complement: 222
- Armament: 2 × single 5 in (127 mm) guns; 2 × twin 40 mm (1.6 in) AA guns; 10 × single 20 mm (0.79 in) AA guns; 1 × triple 21 in (533 mm) torpedo tubes; 8 × depth charge throwers; 1 × Hedgehog ASW mortar; 2 × depth charge racks

USS Richard W. Suesens (DE-342) was a John C. Butler-class destroyer escort in service with the United States Navy from 1944 to 1947. She was finally sold for scrap in 1973.

== Namesake ==
Richard Wayne Suesens was born 30 April 1915 at Burlington, Iowa. He enlisted in the Naval Reserve on 31 May 1938. Appointed Aviation Cadet on 4 October 1938 and commissioned ensign on 15 October 1939, he reported for duty with Torpedo Squadron 3, on board USS Saratoga on 20 November 1939.

Promoted to lieutenant (junior grade) on 1 November 1941, he was killed in action during the Battle of Midway, June 1942. He was posthumously awarded the Navy Cross.

== History ==
Richard W. Suesens's keel was laid down 1 November 1943 by the Consolidated Steel Corporation of Orange, Texas. The destroyer escort was launched on 11 January 1944, sponsored by Mrs. R. W. Suesens, widow of the ship's namesake; and commissioned on 26 April 1944.

Completing shakedown off Bermuda and post-shakedown availability at Boston, Richard W. Suesens sailed for Long Island Sound on 29 June 1944. That night, in Buzzard's Bay, she collided with the minesweeper USS Valor. The coastal minesweeper sank and the destroyer escort transported survivors to Newport, Rhode Island. Then she continued on, reported for duty at New York City, thence, on 4 July, proceeded south. A unit of CortDiv 69, she served as escort for ships en route to Mayport, then steamed on through the Panama Canal, reporting to the Pacific Fleet 23 July. On 2 August she arrived at San Diego, whence she sailed with TransDiv 10 to Hawaii. Arriving on 19 August, she trained there until mid-September, then headed west with convoy PD-89-T, bound for Eniwetok. There, on 22 September, she joined TF 33 and 8 days later sailed for Manus and duty with the 7th Fleet.

Assigned to TU 77.4.24, an escort carrier unit, Richard W. Suesens sailed for the Philippines 14 October. On 16 October, TG 77.4 rendezvoused with TG 78.6 to provide air coverage for transports en route from Hollandia to Leyte. Through the landings on 20 October and the covering operations which followed, the DE, alternating plane guard and screening duties continued to operate with the "jeep" carriers. On 22 October TU 77.4.24 was dissolved. Richard W. Suesens with six escort carriers, three destroyers, and four other destroyer escorts formed TU 77.4.2 and with TU 77.4.1 and TU 77.4.3 took up patrol duties to the east of Leyte Gulf whence their planes could provide air support for the amphibious forces, fly CAP and ASP for the Leyte areas, interdict Japanese supply movements, and drop supplies to Army units inland. Called "Taffy 1", "Taffy 2", and "Taffy 3" from the radio call sign used by each unit commander, the units proceeded to their operational areas: Taffy 1 off northern Mindanao, Taffy 2 off the entrance to Leyte Gulf, Taffy 3 off Samar.

During the early morning hours of 25 October, the Battle of Surigao Strait was fought and daybreak searches were ordered flown to hunt down the retiring Japanese ships. Planes from Taffy 1 were designated to fly the searches while other units continued air support and patrol operations. At dawn the planes were launched on their missions. At 0645 Richard W. Suesens intercepted ship plane traffic on VHF reporting an enemy battleship and cruiser force closing on Taffy 3 as its carriers made every effort to get torpedo planes airborne along with fighters to drive off the enemy ships. All available planes from Taffy 2 were dispatched to join those of Taffy 3. The Battle off Samar had begun. By 0720 the enemy force had closed to within 20 miles (32 km) of Taffy 2. The destroyers formed a line between the carriers' circular disposition and the approaching enemy. The escorts remained with the carriers as they continued to rearm returning planes and send them northward into the now visible gunsmoke clouds over Taffy 3.

Through the morning Richard W. Suesens, screening Taffy 2, listened as torpedo planes and fighters conducted aerial attacks and Taffy 3's destroyers and escorts challenged the enemy's larger ships on the surface. By 0920 the latter were only 12 miles (19 km) from Taffy 2 and their shells splashed among the destroyers, but the battle was turning. The Japanese now so close to their objective-entrance into Leyte Gulf-were no longer on the offensive. TG 77.4, despite staggering losses while protecting shipping in the Gulf, now commenced the pursuit, which, taken up by others, continued until 29 October. Rescue operations and logistic resupply followed on 26 October. On the night of 27 – 28 October, Richard W. Suesens resumed screening and plane guard duties and at the end of the month she headed south.

Arriving at Manus 3 November, Richard W. Suesens spent the next 3 weeks undergoing upkeep and maintenance, then reported for duty in TF 79, the force staging for the invasion of Luzon. On 31 December the force sortied from Seeadler Harbor and headed for the Philippines. On 8 January 1945, the Japanese attacked. USS Kitkun Bay and HMAS Westralia were damaged by kamikazes, but the force continued on to arrive in Lingayen Gulf in the early hours of 9 January. During the assault, and after, Richard W. Suesens patrolled off the transport area. On 12 January as she rescued survivors from USS Gilligan, she was closed by a kamikaze in a steep, full-power dive. Anti-aircraft fire apparently killed the pilot, but the plane kept its momentum and, after skimming the after 40 mm gun, crashed into the sea. The subsequent explosion injured 11 of the destroyer escort's crew and caused minor damage to the hull.

Richard W. Suesens then retired to Leyte, whence she sailed on 27 January to screen landing craft to Nasugbu. There, on 31 January, she covered the assault forces as they began their fight to Manila. Retiring to Mindoro on 2 February, she screened resupply runs to Nasugbu and brought out casualties through 23 February, witnessing on 16 February the paratroop landing on Corregidor.

Returning to Leyte, she prepared for Operation Iceberg, the invasion of the Ryukyus, and on 21 March sailed with the Western Islands Attack Force. Arriving off Kerama Retto on 26 March she screened the transport area there during the initial assault, then remained on patrol off that anchorage into mid-April when she shifted to the Hagushi Beach anchorage. Employed as a picket ship in the antisubmarine and antiaircraft ring around the Kerama Retto-Okinawa area, she survived the nightly air raids and numerous kamikaze attacks, splashing four planes and assisting in the destruction of two more before retiring to Ulithi on 26 April.

In early May she underwent availability at Ulithi, then served as radar picket ship north of that base. On 27 May she returned to Okinawa where, until 28 June, she alternated escort duty with picket ship responsibilities. She then returned to Leyte, joined TG 32.1 and between 1 July and 6 August covered minesweeping operations in the East China Sea in support of the blockade of the Japanese home islands. On 7 August she returned to Okinawa where she was employed in escort work for the remainder of the war. From the mid-August cessation of hostilities until late September, she continued escort runs, including one to Jinsen, Korea. Then, on 22 September, she sailed for Japan. There she supported occupation forces in the Wakayama-Wakanoura area through October. On 1 November, she was en route home.

== Fate ==
On 21 November Richard W. Suesens arrived at San Diego for inactivation. In commission, in reserve, from March 1946, she decommissioned on 15 January 1947 and was berthed with the San Diego Group, Pacific Reserve Fleet. Although she was later moved to Stockton, California, she remained a unit of the Reserve Fleet until struck from the Navy List on 15 March 1972. She was sold 13 June 1973 to the National Metal and Steel Corporation, Terminal Island, California for scrapping.

== Honors ==
Richard W. Suesens earned five battle stars during World War II.
