= Bill Sawers =

Scottish footballer

Personal information
- Full name: William Sawers
- Date of birth: 13 June 1871
- Place of birth: Glasgow, Scotland
- Date of death: 20 October 1960 (aged 89)
- Position: Inside forward

Senior career*
Years	Team	Apps	(Gls)
1888–1892	Clyde		
1892–1893	Blackburn Rovers	24	(11)
1893–1894	Stoke	17	(5)
1894–1895	Dundee	14	(7)
1895	Stoke	1	(0)
1895	Dundee	9	(3)
1896	Kilmarnock		
1896	Abercorn		
1897	Clyde		

International career
1895	Scotland	1	(0)
- * Club domestic league appearances and goals

William Sawers (13 June 1871 – 20 October 1960) was a Scottish footballer who played in the Football League for Blackburn Rovers and Stoke, as well as with Scottish Division One side Dundee.

== Career ==
Sawers was born in Glasgow and began his career with Clyde before joining English side Blackburn Rovers in 1892. He spent the 1892–93 season at Blackburn where he played in 28 matches scoring 14 goals before leaving for Stoke. He scored five goals in 18 matches for the "Potters" before returning north to Dundee, where he would score 8 goals in 19 matches for the "Dark Blues". He did make one more appearance for Stoke in September 1895 but returned to Dundee that same month, scoring a further 3 goals in 9 matches, before moving to fellow Scottish side Kilmarnock at the turn of the year.

Sawers was capped once by Scotland, in a 2–2 draw against Wales in March 1895.

== Career statistics ==
=== Club ===
Club	Season	League			FA Cup		Total	
Club	Season	Division	Apps	Goals	Apps	Goals	Apps	Goals
Blackburn Rovers	1892–93	First Division	24	11	4	3	28	14
Stoke	1893–94	First Division	17	5	1	0	18	5
Stoke	1895–96	First Division	1	0	0	0	1	0
Stoke	Stoke total		18	5	1	0	19	5
Dundee	1894–95	Scottish Division One	14	7	5	1	19	8
Dundee	1895–96	Scottish Division One	9	3	0	0	9	3
Dundee	Dundee total		23	10	5	1	28	11
Career Total			65	26	10	4	75	30

=== International ===
National team	Year	Apps	Goals
Scotland	1895	1	0
Total		1	0
