= Tom Lonie =

Scottish footballer

Personal information
- Full name: Thomas Lonie
- Date of birth: 26 November 1874
- Place of birth: Dundee, Scotland
- Date of death: 1941 (aged 66–67)
- Position: Forward

Senior career*
Years	Team	Apps	(Gls)
1892	Dundee Harp		
1893	Johnstone Wanderers		
1893	Notts County	0	(0)
1894	Darwen	8	(2)
1894	Dundee Wanderers		
1895	Dundee	10	(7)
1895–1896	Stoke	9	(4)
1896	Leicester Fosse	7	(3)
- * Club domestic league appearances and goals

Thomas Lonie (26 November 1874 – 1941) was a Scottish footballer who played in the Football League for Darwen, Leicester Fosse and Stoke.

== Career ==
Lonie was born in Dundee and played for local sides Dundee Harp and Johnstone Wanderers before moving to England with Notts County. He failed to get a match at County and left for Darwen before moving back to Dundee. Stoke brought him back down south and he scored four goals in nine matches during the 1895–96 season. He left at the end of the season to play for Leicester Fosse.

== Career statistics ==
Appearances and goals by club, season and competition
Club	Season	League			FA Cup		Total	
Club	Season	Division	Apps	Goals	Apps	Goals	Apps	Goals
Darwen	1894–95	Second Division	8	2	0	0	8	2
Dundee	1894–95	Scottish Division One	3	2	0	0	3	2
Dundee	1895–96	Scottish Division One	7	5	0	0	7	5
Dundee	Total		10	7	0	0	10	7
Stoke	1895–96	First Division	9	4	0	0	9	4
Leicester Fosse	1896–97	Second Division	7	3	0	0	7	3
Career total			34	16	0	0	34	16
