= Tannadice Park =

Football stadium in Scotland

- Tannadice
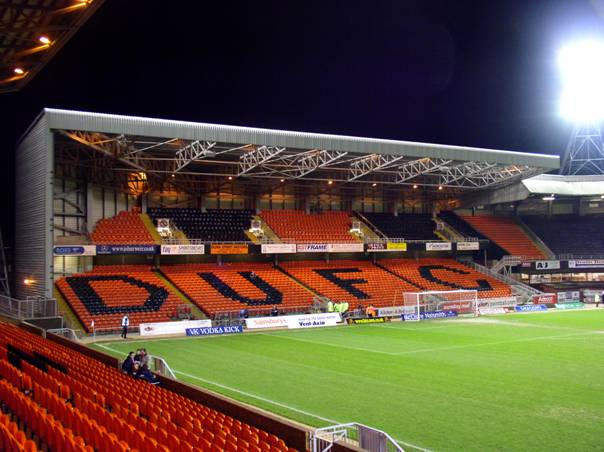
- The Eddie Thompson Stand at Tannadice

- Location in Dundee
- Full name: CalForth Construction Arena at Tannadice Park
- Former names: Clepington Park (1882–1909)
- Location: Tannadice Street, Dundee, Scotland
- Coordinates: 56°28′29″N 2°58′08″W
- Owner: Dundee United
- Capacity: 14,223
- Surface: Grass
- Scoreboard: Yes
- Record attendance: 28,000 (16 November 1966, Dundee United v Barcelona)
- Field size: 110 x 72 yards (100.6 x 65.8 metres)

Construction
- Renovated: 1891, 1909, 1962, 1992–1997
- Architect: James Paul Associates (1992–1997)

Tenants
- Dundee East End Dundee Violet Johnstone Wanderers Dundee Wanderers Dundee United Dundee United Juniors: 1882–1883, 1887–1891; 1883–1884; 1891–1894; 1894–1909; 1909–present 1940–1944

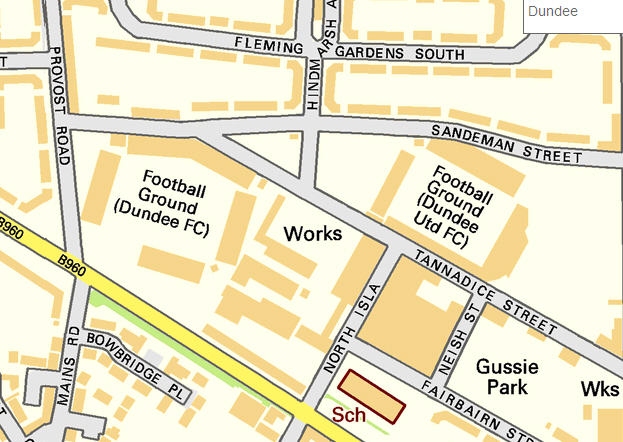
Map showing the proximity of Tannadice Park (right) to Dundee FC's stadium Dens Park (left)

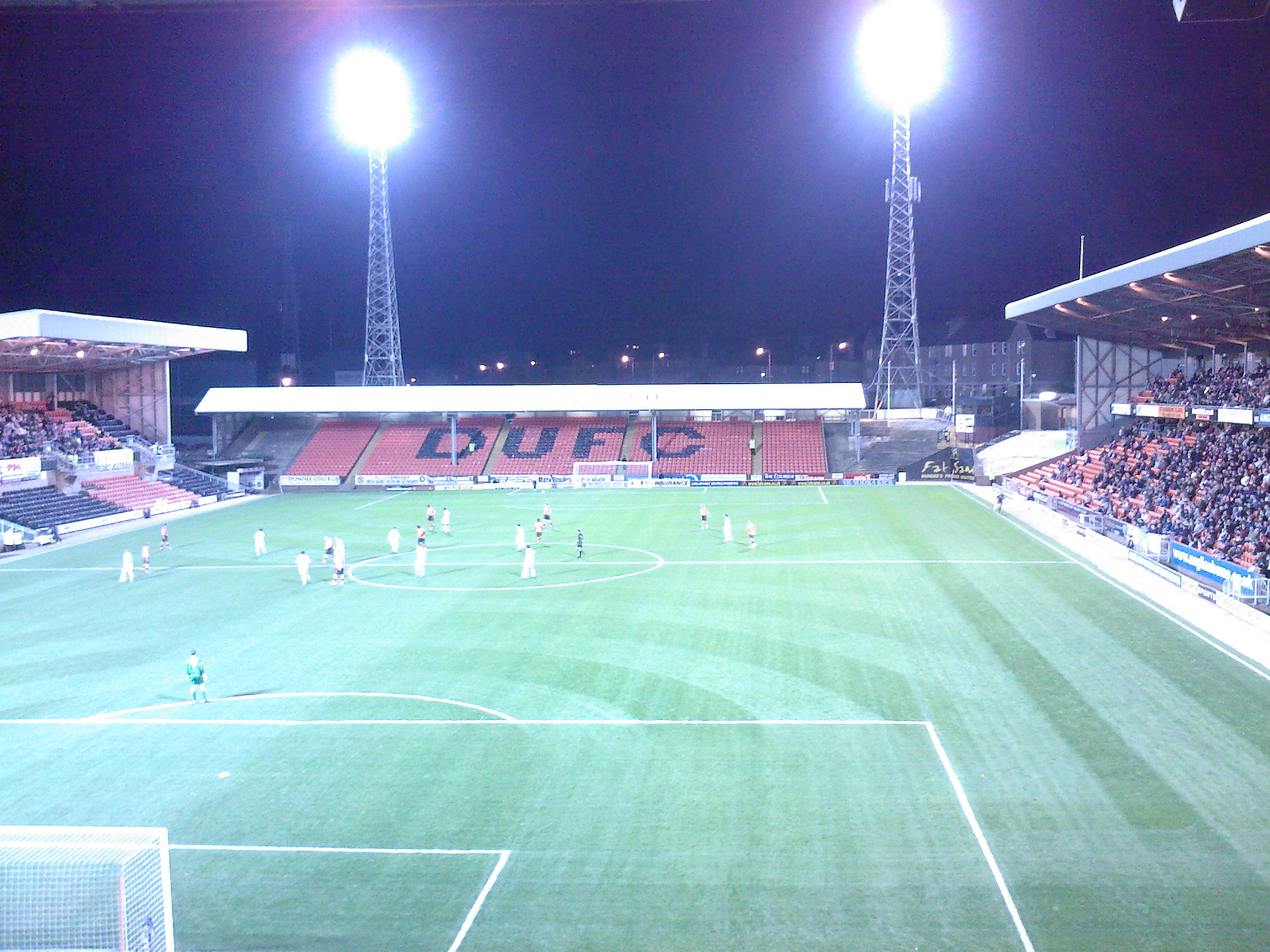
View of 'The Shed', with the George Fox Stand on the right and Jim McLean Fair Play stand on the left

Tannadice Park, officially known as The CalForth Construction Arena for sponsorship reasons, is a football stadium in Dundee, Scotland. It is the home ground of Dundee United, who have played at Tannadice since the club was founded as Dundee Hibernian in 1909. The stadium has been all-seated since 1994 and has a capacity of 14,223. It is located only 200 yards (183 metres) from Dundee F.C.'s stadium, Dens Park; the two are the closest senior football grounds in the UK.

The ground was previously known as Clepington Park, and was used by a number of local teams in the 19th century. It was the home of Dundee Wanderers from 1894 until 1909, including their single season in membership of the Scottish Football League (1894–95). The name of the ground was changed to Tannadice when Dundee Hibernian took over the lease in 1909.

== History ==
=== Early days (1870s–1919) ===
The ground that is now Tannadice (then called Clepington Park) was first used for football in the 1870s, when the surrounding area of Dundee was still largely open countryside. In July 1882, Dundee East End secured the use of Clepington Park for the coming season, remaining there until the following year, when they moved to Madeira Park. Clepington was also used by newly formed junior club Dundee Violet during the 1883–84 season.

Both clubs vacated Clepington in 1884; Violet relocated to Fairmuir, while East End had spells at Madeira Park and Pitkero Park before returning to Clepington in 1887. They remained there until moving to Carolina Port, the most developed ground in Dundee at the time, in 1891. East End would subsequently amalgamate with Dundee Our Boys to form Dundee F.C. in 1893. Clepington Park was subsequently taken over by Johnstone Wanderers, who had begun as an offshoot of Our Boys.

By this time, the surrounding modern street pattern had begun to emerge, with Provost Road, Arklay Street, and Clepington Road all having been laid out. West of Arklay Street remained open land while the east was being developed. By 1890, one of the new streets leading off Arklay Street had been given the name Tannadice Street. The Tannadice name comes from the fact that the Clepington lands had belonged to Neish family of Tannadice and Clepington, who are also commemorated in the name of the adjacent Neish Street.

In 1891, Johnstone Wanderers decided to enclose Clepington to enable them to charge for admission. In conjunction, it was decided to utilise the natural slope roughly a hundred yards to the west (below what is now Sandeman Street) in order to provide better views for spectators. As well as enclosing the new pitch, now situated on approximately its modern alignment, the club built a modest grandstand, a simple uncovered wooden structure with bench seating. It probably housed no more than 500 spectators.

In January 1894 Johnstone Wanderers merged with another local club, Strathmore, to form Dundee Wanderers. The new combination successfully applied for Scottish Football League membership and Clepington Park staged its first Scottish League fixture against Motherwell on 25 August 1894.

Wanderers struggled at national level, however, and were not re-elected at the end of the season, dropping down to the Northern League. From 1899, Wanderers had to contend with considerable competition for local support with the opening of Dens Park, the new Dundee F.C. ground. This was situated almost opposite Clepington, where the extended Tannadice Street met Sandeman Street at an angle. The two grounds are approximately 200 yards apart, which is the shortest distance between two senior football grounds in Britain. Only the grounds of two clubs in Budapest, MTK and BKV Elore, are closer together than Dens and Tannadice in the whole of Europe, as their grounds back onto each other.

=== New owners (1909) ===
1909 saw the formation of Dundee Hibernian, a new club representing the city's Irish community, which had previously supported Dundee Harp. As much of the local Irish population was concentrated in the Lochee district, it was assumed the Hibs would seek to set up home in that area. However, rather than building a new ground from scratch, the new club's secretary Pat Reilly took the controversial step of approaching the landlord of Clepington Park to secure a ready-made venue. The Hibs committee made an offer to the landlords which exceeded what Wanderers were paying; as a result, the established tenants were informed that their lease would not be renewed for the coming season.

The extent of Wanderers' anger at this development is evident from their decision to effectively dismantle Clepington's fixtures and fittings. The grandstand, changing rooms, fencing and even the goalposts were removed, leaving Hibs with an open field rather than the ready-made ground they had envisaged. Nevertheless, the new club took over the lease, and a decision was taken to emphasise the new era by changing the name of the ground, Tannadice Park being adopted from the name of the street on which the ground's main entrance would be situated.

Hibs' first priority was to re-equip Tannadice for the new season and a new grandstand and fencing were soon provided. A cricket-style pavilion housing dressing rooms was constructed in the south east corner of the ground, where the players' tunnel is today; this survived until 1961. An indication of the rapid development of the new Tannadice is contained in a report from the city's Evening Telegraph, 21 July 1909:

The pavilion is a splendid two-storey structure built of brick, containing two large dressing-rooms, two committee rooms, press box and referee's room. The pavilion will be lit by electricity. The stand on the road side will be the whole length of the field and will seat about 1,000 people.

=== Hibs and United (1909–1959) ===
The club's and the ground's inaugural match was against Hibernian on 18 August 1909, in front of a crowd of 7,000. The original capacity of Tannadice Park was around 10,000, the terracings were specially extended and additional temporary seating erected for a Qualifying Cup-tie against Forfar Athletic in 1913; all of this was necessary to allow a record crowd to be accommodated, and the reported attendance was 15,000.

Dundee Hibs was renamed Dundee United in 1923, after a consortium had taken over the club and obtained re-election to the Scottish Football League.

No improvements to the ground were made until Dundee United won promotion to Division One for the first time in 1925. The Scottish League Management Committee informed the club that Tannadice would be subject to an inspection during the close season to ensure that it was up to the standard required for the higher level, and this clearly concentrated the directors' minds. Since 1909, Tannadice had been leased, but the board now decided to buy the ground, paying £2,500. Extensive renovations were then begun, the first to the pitch. There was a steep upwards slope towards the corner where the George Fox and East Stands now meet, and this necessitated solid rock being blasted to enable it to be levelled. There is still a slope of approximately 2 metres from north-west to south-east today. For the first time, proper terracings were constructed, while the pavilion was given a facelift and new turnstiles were built.

During the Second World War, United were forced to close down temporarily in 1940 due to there being no senior league operating in the area. As a result, an associated junior club, Dundee United Juniors, was formed to play at Tannadice. Although United returned to senior football in 1941, United Juniors continued to share the ground until they closed down in 1944.

The various financial crises which beset the club in the 1930s and its general lack of success on the pitch prevented any further ground improvements until 1953. At that time, the north terracing was concreted and four years later the same was done at both ends. During the close season of 1957, an important development took place with the construction of the Shed, which was opened in September of that year.

=== The Kerr and McLean eras (1959–1992) ===
The new Main Stand, opened in August 1962, was the first in Scotland to be constructed with a cantilever roof to provide column-free viewing for spectators. It was intended at the time that the whole ground would be re-built in a similar manner, but due to lack of finance no further building took place. This meant that the stand, which had a very tight spacing between the rows of seats, is an unusual L-shape around the south-eastern corner of the ground. The stand was also the first in Scotland to have a glass fronted lounge for the benefit of sponsors. This was opened in 1971 and overlooked the pitch, something that is now a common sight in football grounds across the country.

Much of the stadium's development in the 1950s and 60s was funded by the introduction of 'Taypools' a football pool run by a separate development club known as the 'Dundee United Sportsmen's Club' all profits of which went to the football club. The scheme was introduced in 1955 by directors Johnstone Grant and George Fox having seen a similar scheme in operation at Nottingham Forest

The stadium celebrated its centenary in 1983 – the year that Dundee United won their first and to date only league title. Under-soil heating was installed during the close season of 1985 at a reported cost of £100,000, United were the fourth Scottish club to have the facility, following Queen's Park, Rangers and Hibernian. The first time the under-soil heating was called into action was when a fairly heavy snowfall started during the UEFA Cup 3rd round first leg tie against Neuchâtel Xamax on 27 November 1985 and the system failed.

1988 saw the covering of the small enclosure adjacent to the Main Stand. This was named the Fair Play enclosure as it was financed by a cash award made by UEFA following the sporting behaviour of United fans following the 1987 UEFA Cup Final 2nd leg. The funds were awarded to the club with a clear stipulation from UEFA that it should be used to improve spectator facilities.

=== Modern Tannadice (1992–present) ===
At the time of the Taylor Report on football ground safety, which was published in January 1990, Tannadice had a capacity of 22,310, but only 2,252 seats (all in the 1962 Main Stand). For a period in 1990, Dundee United considering sharing a new stadium with Dundee, but decided to redevelop Tannadice in 1991.

Many modifications were made at Tannadice in order to bring the stadium up to modern standards. Two new grandstands were constructed in the early nineties. The two tiered George Fox stand, was built in 1992 and is named after a former chairman of the club. The East Stand, a similar two tiered construction was built in 1994, and was renamed the Eddie Thompson stand in 2008. The latest stand to be constructed was the Fair Play stand in 1997. This stand form an extension to the Jerry Kerr stand along one side of the pitch, and now houses away fans on match day. Tangerine plastic seating was installed in the West Stand at the same time, with black seats spelling out 'DUFC'. This development made Tannadice an all seater stadium. Several lesser modifications have taken place since the start of the 21st century, namely to allow participation in European competition. In 2009, the traditional flood lights were removed and replaced with a brighter roof mounted lighting system, and in 2010 the original wooden seats in the Jerry Kerr stand were removed and replaced with tangerine plastic seating.

The roof of the Jerry Kerr Stand was damaged in November 2021 by Storm Arwen, which forced the stand to be closed for a league match against Celtic.

== Stadium layout ==
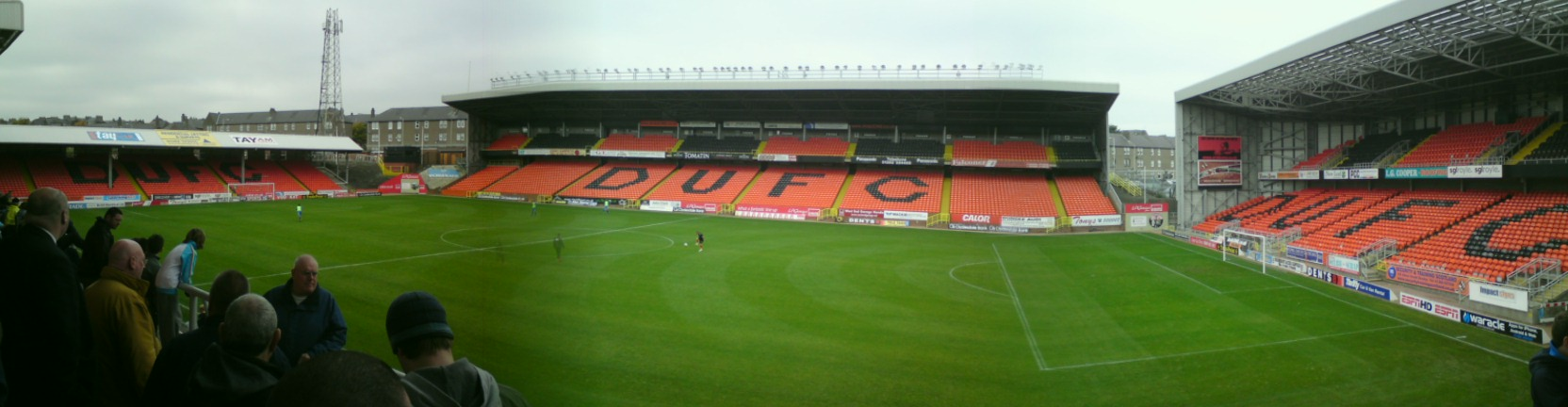
A panoramic view of 'The Shed', The George Fox Stand and the Eddie Thompson Stand

Tannadice is an all-seater stadium and has been so since 1994. The various stands are as follows:

The Jerry Kerr Stand: Originally built in 1962, it was the first cantilevered stand at a football ground in Scotland and only the third in the UK (after Sheffield Wednesday and Scunthorpe).

Particularly notable for its unusual L-shaped construction, the stand runs from the halfway line on the south (Tannadice Street) side of the pitch, bending around the ground's south east corner, to end slightly along the east goal-line. The only seated accommodation at the ground prior to the post-Taylor Report redevelopment, it was known simply as the Main Stand until 2003, when it was renamed in honour of Jerry Kerr, the manager who had overseen its construction. The development of other parts of Tannadice has meant that this stand is now normally reserved for away supporters.

The Jim McLean Fair Play Stand: The most recent addition to the stadium, opened in 1997. Although separately named, it is effectively an extension of the old Main Stand to cover the entirety of the ground's south side. The name derives from the Fair Play Enclosure, a small enclosed terrace which previously occupied this corner of Tannadice, and itself named for the award given to United and their fans by FIFA following the club's run to the 1987 UEFA Cup Final. This stand is also reserved for visiting supporters. It was renamed after the club's most successful manager Jim McLean in 2011.

The West Stand: Invariably referred to by its historic nickname, The Shed, it retains its original roof construction dating from 1957; between then and 1980, it was the only covered standing area at Tannadice, therefore becoming the most popular and atmospheric part of the ground. Since 1994, seats have been installed on the original terracing, parts of which are still visible at the corners. With season ticket holders now accommodated in the more modern parts of the stadium, the Shed can be allocated to either home or away supporters as demand dictates.

The George Fox Stand: Named after a long serving club director, this two-tier stand was built in 1991–92 along the north side of the ground and was the first phase in the conversion of Tannadice to meet all-seater requirements. It is allocated to home supporters.

The Eddie Thompson Stand: Opened in 1994 as the East Stand, and with a similar design to the adjacent George Fox Stand, it also has two tiers of seating. The East Stand now houses the loudest and most passionate elements of the United support, whereas George Fox patrons have the reputation of being somewhat more restrained in their behaviour. As such, this end of Tannadice is the spiritual heir of the old "Shed". In March 2008, the stand was renamed after the then terminally ill club chairman, Eddie Thompson.

== Attendance records ==
Official attendance figures are largely unavailable in Scottish football prior to the 1980s, other than for Scottish Cup ties, but the following figures as reported in the media give a guide to the progressive record attendance figures at Tannadice down the years.

Dundee Hibs' first match at Tannadice, a friendly against Hibernian of Edinburgh on 18 August 1909, was watched by a crowd of 7,000. This figure appears to be in excess of any crowd to watch a league fixture at the ground prior to the First World War. Cup ties tended to attract higher attendances in this era, and after the terraces were specially extended to accommodate the expected large crowd, 15,000 watched a Scottish Qualifying Cup tie against Forfar Athletic on 1 November 1913.

Promotion to the top flight in 1925 saw further ground improvements and two new records set, firstly when 20,000 were estimated to have watched Celtic's visit on 19 September 1925. Then a much larger than anticipated crowd of 23,517 packed in to watch an important late season Tayside derby against St Johnstone on 17 April 1926, with both clubs fighting relegation.

The largest crowd to have watched a League fixture at Tannadice was 25,000 in the derby against Dundee on 3 January 1927. This remained the overall record until 23 February 1952, when 26,407 saw a Scottish Cup tie against Aberdeen, the all-time record for any domestic fixture on the ground. To date, the official record attendance at Tannadice remains the 28,000 who watched the club's home European debut, an Inter-Cities Fairs Cup match against FC Barcelona on 16 November 1966. Since then, in common with many other grounds, safety legislation and conversion to all-seating has drastically reduced Tannadice's capacity, with the modern stadium holding little over half that number.

== Other uses ==
=== Football ===
Tannadice staged a B international match between Scotland and Turkey in December 2003.

=== Greyhound racing ===
Tannadice was the first venue in Dundee to stage greyhound racing when it came to the city in 1928. The first meeting took place on 18 May 1928. The track was independent (unlicensed) and meetings were held regularly on Saturdays and Wednesdays during the summer. Despite reasonable crowds the layout of the venue was not particularly suited to racing and it ended during the same year. Dens Park would become Dundee's regular greyhound venue from 1932.

=== Boxing ===
On 1 January 1941, during a season when Dundee United were inactive due to the Second World War, a boxing match was staged at Tannadice. Local boxer Jim Brady defeated Kid Tanner of British Guiana to win the British Empire bantamweight title in front of 3,500 spectators.
