= Westmarch =

Westmarch may refer to:

- Westmarch, Paisley, a defunct football stadium in Paisley, Scotland
- Westmarch, an area of The Shire in J. R. R. Tolkien's fictional Middle-earth
