= Billy Fleming =

Scottish footballer (1871–1934)

Personal information
- Date of birth: 11 December 1871
- Place of birth: Renton, Scotland
- Date of death: 17 September 1934 (aged 62)
- Place of death: Glasgow, Scotland
- Height: 5 ft 7 in (1.70 m)
- Position: Inside forward

Senior career*
Years	Team	Apps	(Gls)
18??–1892	Partick Thistle	5	(2)
1892–1893	Darlington		
1893–189?	Sheffield United	21	(7)
1894–1895	Dundee	14	(3)
1895–1896	Abercorn		
1896	Bury	2	(1)
1896	Tottenham Hotspur	2	(1)
- * Club domestic league appearances and goals

William Thomas Fleming (11 December 1871 – 17 September 1934) was a Scottish footballer who played as an inside forward in the English Football League for Sheffield United and Bury and in the Scottish League for Dundee and Abercorn. He also played for Scottish Alliance club Partick Thistle and in England for Darlington of the Northern League and Tottenham Hotspur of the Southern League.

== Life and career ==
William Thomas Fleming was born on 11 December 1871 in Renton, West Dunbartonshire. By January 1891, he was playing football for Partick Thistle, and in the 1891–92 season he scored twice from five appearances in Thistle's first season in the Scottish Alliance.

Fleming and team-mate Watty Keay moved to English football when they signed for Darlington of the Northern League in the 1892 close season. Both attracted interest from a higher level, and "a promising forward from Darlington named W. Fleming" became Sheffield United's first signing after their promotion to the Football League First Division. He promised enough to go straight into the team for the club's first match of the season, and six matches into the campaign he had four goals and the team sat top of the league. He finished the season with seven goals from 21 league matches – only Bob Hill, with eleven, scored more – and his team dropped into the bottom half of the table.

He returned to Scotland and signed for Division One club Dundee, for which he scored three goals from 14 appearances as his team finished eighth out of ten in the league. At the end of the season, he moved on to Division Two club Abercorn, for whom he played on the right wing. According to the Courier, he played well in a Qualifying Cup match in mid-November, "and it was generally remarked round the ropes that Dundee made a great mistake in dispensing with his services."

In January 1896, well known football agents Messrs Lucas and McGregor expedited Fleming's return to England. Having reportedly rejected several prior offers, he signed for Bury; a fee of £30 went to Abercorn and a further fee to Sheffield United, who had retained his Football League registration. He played twice in the First Division for Bury, scoring once, on his debut away to Sheffield Wednesday, and remained with them into the new season.

In October 1896, Fleming was reported to be back in Scotland and seeking work, but he joined Tottenham Hotspur in November 1896. Ahead of his first appearance, the Daily Telegraph highlighted the high level at which he had previously played. He scored twice against Gravesend United in the Wellingborough Charity Cup, scored again on his Southern League debut in a 3–1 defeat at home to Millwall Athletic, but was suspended by the club in December, reportedly for insubordination, and did not play again.

Fleming's older brother James, known as Jock Fleming, played League football for Aston Villa and Lincoln City.

Fleming died on 17 September 1934 in Glasgow at the age of 62.

== Sources ==
- Goodwin, Bob (2017). The Spurs Alphabet. Robwin. ISBN 978-0-9540434-2-1.
- Joyce, Michael (2004). Football League Players' Records 1888 to 1939. Nottingham: SoccerData. ISBN 978-1-899468-67-6.
- Tweddle, Frank (2000). The Definitive Darlington F.C. Nottingham: SoccerData. ISBN 978-1-899468-15-7.
