= James Brown (1890s footballer) =

Scottish footballer

James Brown was a Scottish footballer. His regular position was as a defender. He played for Manchester United, Dundee Our Boys, and Dundee.
