= Tommy Vail =

Scottish footballer (1873–1940)

Personal information
- Full name: Thomas Naismith Vail
- Date of birth: 1873
- Place of birth: Auchterderran, Fife, Scotland
- Date of death: 3 July 1940 ~67 years old
- Place of death: Buckhaven, Fife, Scotland
- Position: Centre forward

Senior career*
Years	Team	Apps	(Gls)
- Lochgelly United
1895–1896	Dundee	9	(5)
1896	Bolton Wanderers	4	(1)
1896–1898	Chatham United		
1898–1899	Walsall	31	(16)
1899	Bristol Rovers	2	(0)
1899–1900	Gainsborough Trinity		
1900–1901	Doncaster Rovers		(20)
1901–1903	Lochgelly United		
1903–1905	Dunfermline Athletic		
- * Club domestic league appearances and goals

Tommy Vail (born 1873) was a Scottish footballer who played as a centre forward with Lochgelly United, Dundee, Bolton Wanderers, Chatham United, Walsall, Bristol Rovers, Gainsborough Trinity, Doncaster Rovers and Dunfermline Athletic.

== Playing career ==
Born in Auchterderran, Fife, he is first known to have played for his local club Lochgelly United, and then was signed by Dundee before moving to Division 1 team Bolton Wanderers after the start of the 1895–96 season where he scored once in 4 games.

After a failed trial at Oldham Athletic, in 1896 Vail moved south to Chatham United for two seasons in the Southern League.

The next season he was with Walsall of Division 2. In March, Small Heath unsuccessfully tried to get him on a loan. He ended the season as joint top scorer with 16 League goals as Walsall finished in 6th place.

The following season he moved to fellow Division 2 club Gainsborough Trinity.

For the 1900–01 season Vail went to play for Midland League side Doncaster Rovers, scoring 26 League and Cup goals, plus 5 in friendlies. He was also used as a trainer.

He then moved back to Scotland and played for his old club Lochgelly United, before a move in March 1903 to Dunfermline Athletic. He retired in 1905.

== Personal life ==
Vail was born in 1873 in Auchterderran, Fife to Michael Vail and Ann Naysmith. He married Betsy Watson on 26 Oct 1898 in Auchterderran. Around 1901, whilst playing for Doncaster he also worked as a railway labourer. He died on 3 July 1940 in Buckhaven, Fife.
