= Carolina Port =

Football stadium in Dundee, Scotland

- Location within Dundee City council area
- Location: Dundee, Scotland
- Coordinates: 56.466°N 2.934°W
- Surface: Grass

Construction
- Opened: 1891
- Closed: 1899

Tenants
- Dundee East End F.C. (1891–1893); Strathmore F.C. (1893–1894); Dundee F.C. (1894–1899)

Carolina Port was a multi-sport stadium in Dundee, Scotland. It staged Scottish national championships in cycling and athletics, and as a football stadium it was an early home of Dundee F.C. and staged Dundee's first international match in 1896. It was the first sports stadium in Scotland to be wholly built and operated by a publicly owned company.

== History ==
In the early part of the eighteenth century there was a regular trade between Dundee and different ports in North America, particularly with Charleston, South Carolina, which was at that time still a British colony. When ships from foreign ports arrived in Dundee they were required to quarantine for a period and had to anchor in the river at a place that came to be called Carolina Roads. In 1788, the Dundee Glassworks Company was founded on a site approximately one mile to the east of the City of Dundee on the banks of the River Tay, and nearby a house and six workmen's cottages were built on around seven acres of land overlooking Carolina Roads. By 1801 the glassworks had closed down and William Lindsay, a corn merchant originally from Edinburgh with a business premises in Dundee High Street, had moved into the main house and let the cottages to tenants, and the property seems to have been called Carolina Port from that time. The first definite mention of the name is when a child was born there in January 1812, to Mrs William Lindsay, a son.

In 1816 there were corn riots in Dundee, Aberdeen, and Montrose protesting at the combination of the high price of corn and low wages. On the evening of Wednesday 4 December 1816 a mob assembled in Hawkhill, to the west of the city, and burned an effigy of Mr Thomson, a local corn dealer. Next they attacked the properties of corn merchants in other parts of the city, in Scouringburn, Overgate, Hilltown, King Street, St Andrew Street, and Murraygate, breaking windows and stealing corn. The mob next went to Carolina Port where they broke into the main house, broke furniture, tore down curtains, stole quantities of food and plate and also seized the grain Lindsay had in store.

In 1838 the Dundee and Arbroath Railway Company laid a line from the Trades Lane station in Dundee to Broughty Ferry that passed through the Carolina Port property, and this section of the line was known at the time as the Trades Lane and Carolina Port Railway. William Lindsay, Provost of Dundee from 1831 to 1833, sought damages from the railway company for their incursion onto his property and interference with his business but ultimately lost his case.

In 1837 Lindsay had, in company with his business partner John Peter of Broughty Ferry, borrowed the sum of £5,000 sterling with the Carolina Port property as security. The loan was from a charitable trust known as Morton Mortification which rendered relief to the poor of the city, and was operated by a board of trustees. In 1849 Lindsay died without the loan having been repaid. In 1853 the trustees of Morton Mortification took an action to recover their debt against the eldest surviving son, Martin Lindsay, who was at that time believed to be in Italy. Unknown to the trustees, however, Martin had been disinherited by his father and had no interest in the property, did not defend the action, and in due course Morton Mortification were granted an assign in the Carolina Port property. In 1866 they brought the property up for public auction and at that time the true heirs realised their position and after a hearing before Lord Barcaple at the Court of Session in Edinburgh the two parties agreed that the property would revert to the executors of the estate of William Lindsay on payment of the debt owed to Morton Mortification, which by that time totalled £12,000 sterling. The property, approximately seven acres in extent, was at that time described as, "perhaps the most valuable piece of ground within a like distance of the High Street in the town of Dundee."

The name of Carolina Port had by this time extended beyond the grounds and by 1850 there was a street called Carolina Port and Carolina Port Pier, which was a commercial pier rather than an entertainment and amusement facility. In 1864 the anchorage off Carolina Port Pier was still being referred to as Carolina Roads but was now being used by sealers waiting their turn to offload their cargo, and maps start to refer to the area generally as Carolina Port. In July 1876 William Cooper opened the Carolina Port Saw Mill in Camperdown Dock, on land adjoining Carolina Port and operated by the Dundee Harbour Trust.

In May 1872 it was announced that the Carolina Port property had been purchased by the City of Dundee who intended to develop a cattle market there to replace, modernise, and enlarge the existing market at Dudhope Crescent. The council paid £17,000 sterling for the property, and estimated that a further £20,000 sterling would be required to construct the pens, slaughter house, stabling, offices and auction lots that would be required according to the plans drawn up by William Mackison, the town surveyor. There would also need to be a hotel to accommodate the cattle agents, sellers, auctioneers and buyers that make a market function, and a railway siding to bring the livestock to market. The final plan also included a house for the Market Keeper and a Porter's lodge.

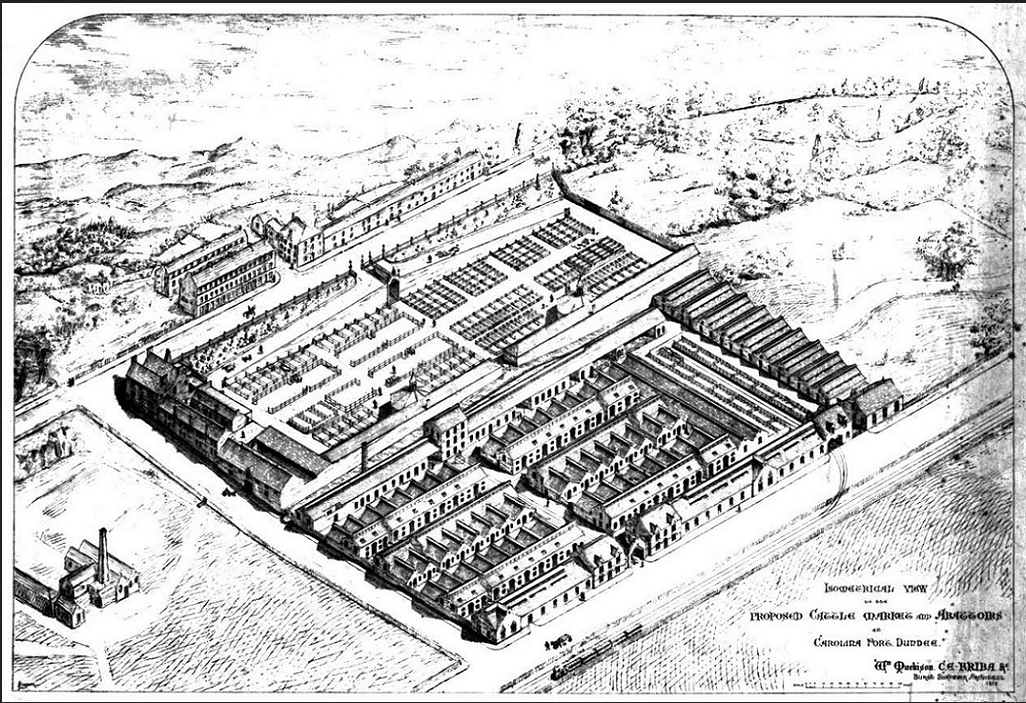
William Mackison's 1872 proposal for the Cattle Market

In November 1874 advertisements appeared for men to start work on the construction of the cattle market, and on the 11 November some of these workmen found a cache of nine silver coins dating from 1575. These were described as being "about the size of a florin" (approx. 30mm in diameter) and were donated to Dundee Free Library. The cattle market eventually opened, with very little fanfare, on Tuesday 26 December 1876, and from that time there would be a weekly auction every Tuesday. The Cattle Market, however, was not a commercial success and as early as October 1881, on the retirement of Provost William Brownlee, he was openly mocked in the newspapers for the "Carolina Port Bungle." In April 1889 a Royal Commission on Market Rights was told that the annual income from the market averaged £960 sterling per year, while the costs averaged £1,336 sterling per year with the deficit made up from the general rates of the burgh, and that at the current rate of repayment the loan and interest would not be paid off until 1937.

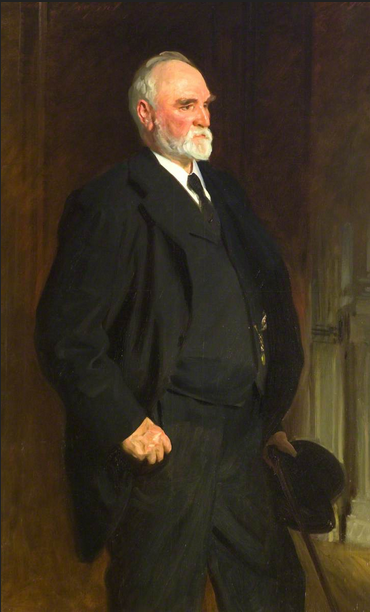
William Brownlee, Provost of Dundee (1878-1881)

By 1878 cricket was played in Baxter Park, on what was described as a "wretched wicket," and also in "a park near Belmont House." In September 1880 twenty-year-old Miss Gillespie, from Glasgow, swam from the Tay Bridge to Broughty Castle, a distance of four and a quarter miles in one hour and eighteen minutes. Four years later Ye Amphibious Ancients Bathing Association was founded in Dundee to promote open water swimming. Dundee Bicycle Club had been formed by 1880, and there was a lawn tennis club with four courts at Camphill, Broughty Ferry, by 1883. In 1884 Quoits clubs opened at Balgillo and Clepington Park, and there was a Bowling club at Baxter Park. Around the same time there were various amateur football teams in the city and the genesis of a league. From 1877 Dundee Our Boys FC played at Baxter Park and Strathmore FC were playing at Magdalen Green where they were joined in 1879 by Dundee Harp FC, while Balgay FC (founded 1881) played at Blackness Park. The Forfarshire Football Association was founded in 1883 with eighteen clubs, twelve of them from Dundee.

Football was played at Carolina Port from the beginning of March 1884. The first known match occurred on Saturday 8 March when Viewforth XI beat Johnstone Rovers 3 goals to nil. The following Saturday Taybank FC beat Eastern Athletic by 7 goals to nil, and Carolina Port is described as, "the ground of the former," making Taybank the first club to call Carolina Port their home. Taybank also had a second team known as the Taybank Swifts. The first athletics club in Dundee was Dundee Harriers, formed in October 1887, who also had a swimming section. The first cinder track in Dundee was the Victoria Athletic Grounds, a cycle track laid in 1887 in James' Park, which no longer exists. The park stretched from Erskine Street to Maitland Street, which was not there in 1887, and from Dura Street down to Lyon Street. The first event there was the sixth East of Scotland Cyclists meet on Saturday 16 July when they had three races over 1 mile, 2 miles, and 3 miles. Cyclists came from as far away as Edinburgh, Glasgow, Perth, and Arbroath to compete, there was a lone New Zealander and thirty eight entrants from two different cycle clubs in Dundee. On the same day Our Boys FC held an athletic sports in West Craigie Park where the 1 mile handicap was won by Charles Pennycook of Strathmore FC. In June 1889 as a member of Clydesdale Harriers he will win the Scottish 1 mile championship at Hampden Park, Glasgow. There was plenty of sport going on in Dundee, but there were not yet any sports facilities within the city with changing rooms, grand stands, or spectator facilitues, except possibly Kinnaird Hall where there were boxing tournaments and gymnastics matches.

In August 1889 it was announced that the Highland and Agricultural Society show was coming to Dundee. A deputation from the City Council led by Provost Hugh Ballingall had approached the society as long ago as 1885 with a view to bringing the show to Dundee for the first time since 1843, but nothing came of it on that occasion. The proposed location of the show was described at that time as, "Carolina Port, to the eastward of the shipbuilding yards," and was given as 25 to 27 acres in extent, so clearly much more than the original 7 acres of William Lindsay's Carolina Port property. The land for the show had been reclaimed naturally from the river by silt and mud gradually accumulating to extend the foreshore and narrow the river to the south and east of the original Carolina Port property. The Harbour Board, who effectively owned all this land through a grant from the Crown, then covered this with ash before laying out the grounds for the show. But this is not where football was being played because there was not and never had been any grass on the showground. The exact location of the Carolina Port football pitch, or pitches, being used before 1891 is not known.

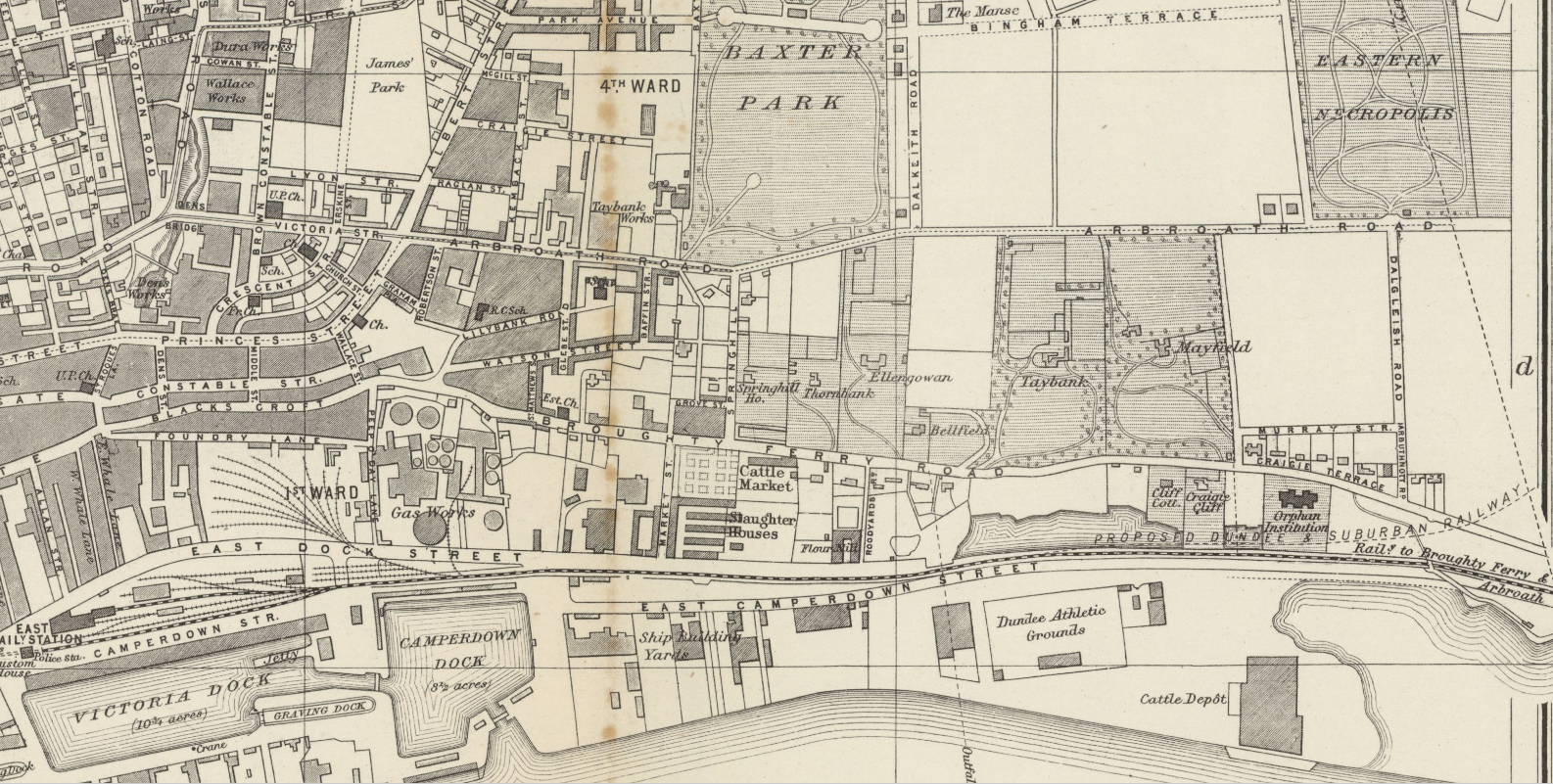
1892 Plan of Dundee

On Saturday 11 January 1890 at the third annual dinner of the Dundee Advertiser Cycling Club in the Queen's Hotel, Dundee, John Leng, Member of Parliament for Dundee and the Honorary vice-President of the cycling club, announced that Dundee City Council had been approached with a view to appropriating the Agricultural Show grounds after the show and converting them into a public sports facility. Leng, who was also the editor of the Dundee Advertiser, was principally interested in creating a cycling track for the city but the suggestion was made that it could be for more than one purpose. Unfortunately the city didn't own the site of the show ground and this came to nothing, but the announcement inspired the Scottish Cyclists' Union to approach the Harbour Board with a proposal to lease the showground from them for five years where they would lay out a cycle track, running track, and football pitch, to be operated by a limited liability company. In April 1891 the Harbour Board replied to this proposal by stating, "in view of the probable extension of the harbour, it would be inexpedient for the Board to grant the application."

The Harbour Board were sympathetic to the scheme, but extending the harbour was not the real problem. In August 1890 the Harbour Board had opened at the eastern end of the reclaimed land a new cattle dock for importing cattle from abroad, and in October 1890 they had granted a lease for a local confectionary company called Lindsay & Low to build a jam factory, known as the Preserve Works, to be constructed at the western end, closer to the shipbuilding yards. It had also been suggested that a new railway station be constructed in the East of the city and the Harbour Board were keen for this to be as close as possible to the new cattle dock, but through a complex regulatory framework even though the land was owned by the Harbour Board the railway company had to construct the railway station, and city officials were also involved in these discussions and the location of this station and the route of any line or siding that might be required were not yet known. The Harbour Board did not want to grant any more leases until they knew how much land they had to play with. After discussion with the railway company it became clear that the railway station was not going to be as close to the cattle dock as the Harbour Board had hoped, so they went back to the cyclists and said they were not prepared to offer a lease, but a two year tenancy agreement for four acres at a cost of £40 sterling per acre. This was almost half the price charged for the jam factory. (Note: Lindsay & Low were offered a rate of 9 shillings per pole for the jam factory, while the athletic grounds were let at 5 shillings per pole. There are 160 pole in one acre.)

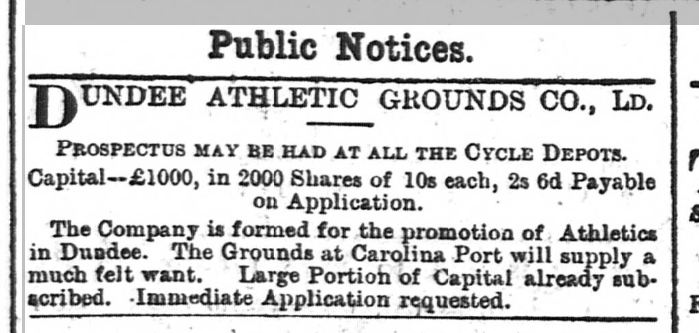
Newspaper advertisement for the Dundee Athletic Grounds Company

At a public meeting in the Queen's Hotel, Dundee on Thursday 23 April 1891 the Dundee Athletic Grounds Company was formed and took possession of four acres of windswept mud on the banks of the River Tay. They offered 2000 shares at 10 shillings each to raise the capital required to develop their athletic grounds and sent a deputation to Ibrox Park, Glasgow, which they used as the model for their cycle track. Bain & Company of Hill Street, Dundee were contracted to build the cycle track, the running track, and to lay out the grounds, while Mackie & How of Caldrum Street, Dundee were engaged to build the grandstand and fencing, at a total cost, estimated in advance, of £450 sterling. It was the first sports stadium in Scotland to be wholly built and operated by a publicly owned company.

The grounds opened on Saturday 18 July 1891. Several hundred cyclists assembled in Albert Square, and at three o'clock in the afternoon they cycled in procession to the grounds where John Leng, Member of Parliament for Dundee and the man whose suggestion had started the whole thing off declared the grounds open. There were separate handicap races for bicycles with solid or pneumatic tyres, two foot-race handicaps, and a five-a-side football tournament with six teams won by Celtic FC who beat Renton FC 2-0 in the final. The very first event was the Scottish 10 mile Bicycle Championship, won by R. A. Vogt of Glasgow in 31:53. The Dundee Trades Band played musical selections throughout the afternoon and the prizes were presented by Miss Vina Mathewson, a granddaughter of Alexander Mathewson, the Lord Provost of Dundee.

On Saturday 26 June 1892 the tenth annual Scottish Amateur Athletic Championships were held at Carolina Port. The weather was not conducive to good performance with rain starting about two hours before the meeting and it fell almost continuously throughout, so no records were established and only a few hundred spectators turned out to watch. For the first time at the championship cups were presented to the winners of the track events. Douglas McCulloch (Helensburgh AC) won the 100 yards and 440 yards, and Norman MacLeod (Glasgow Academicals) was the first winner of the 220 yards with McCulloch in second place. Macleod also won the 120 yard hurdles. Robert Mitchell (St Mirren FC) won the 880 yards for the fourth consecutive year, Henry Munro (London AC) won the 1 mile and was second in the 4 miles, won by George Pollard (Edinburgh Un.). Reginald Williams (Edinburgh Un.) won the high jump, the long jump went to Andrew Graham (1st Lanarkshire Rifle Volunteers), and local boy James MacIntosh (West End Rowing Club) won both the shot put and hammer.

== Non-sports uses ==
On 17 July 1884 the House of Lords blocked the passage of a Bill that would have extended to men who lived in the countryside the same voting rights as men who lived in towns. In the following months there were demonstrations throughout the country to protest this measure and on just one day, Saturday 20 September, there were protests in Hawick, Pontefract, Oldham, Northampton, Consett (County Durham), Pembroke, and Dundee. Workers assembled by trade or guild at various locations throughout the city and marched to Ladybank where 10,000 strong they heard speeches from Hon Preston Bruce, MP, Mr Stephen Williamson MP, Mr Dick Peddie MP, and others. The butchers and fleshers of Dundee assembled at Carolina Port for their two mile march to Ladybank.

== Football ==
East End, one of the leading Dundee clubs, were based at Carolina Port from 1891. When they merged with local rivals Our Boys to form Dundee F.C. in 1893, it was generally assumed that the new club – which had immediately secured election to the Scottish Football League – would base themselves at Carolina Port, which was the most developed ground in Dundee at that time. They were, however, surprisingly beaten to the punch by a comparatively modest local outfit, Strathmore, who secured the lease for themselves. As a result, Dundee began their campaign in the less imposing surroundings of Our Boys' former home, West Craigie Park. Strathmore's audacious move failed to pay off, and within a year they had merged with Johnstone Wanderers to form Dundee Wanderers, playing at Clepington Park. This left Carolina Port available for Dundee to move in midway through their debut season.

Having now become a regular venue for matches in Scotland's top flight, Carolina Port's prestige was further enhanced on 21 March 1896 when it hosted the Home International fixture between Scotland and Wales. Two Dundee players, Alex Keillor and William Thomson, were in the Scottish side. Keillor became the first Dundee player to score a goal for Scotland, as the home side ran out 4–0 winners.

Despite this, it was recognised that Carolina Port's location posed problems. Hemmed in amongst Dundee's harbour and overlooked by a huge pile of shale nicknamed the "burning mountain", future development of the stadium would be difficult. After a major reorganisation of the club in 1898, Dundee F.C. took the decision to relocate to a new site at Dens Park in the less built-up Clepington district. The club moved to their new ground in 1899 (where they are still playing well over 100 years later), and Carolina Port was rapidly consumed by the expansion of the harbour.
