= Harry Matthew =

Scottish footballer

Personal information
- Full name: Henry Moram Matthew
- Date of birth: 16 April 1870
- Place of birth: Dundee, Scotland
- Date of death: 19 February 1956 (aged 85)
- Place of death: Lochee, Scotland
- Position: Wing half

Senior career*
Years	Team	Apps	(Gls)
18??–1892	Darlington		
1892–1893	Bolton Wanderers	8	(0)
1893–1894	Dundee	8	(2)
1894–1897	Millwall Athletic	49	(5)
1897–1898	Preston North End	18	(0)
1898–1899	Gravesend United		
1899–1903	Distillery		
1903	Watford	10	(0)
- * Club domestic league appearances and goals

Henry Moram Matthew (16 April 1870 – 19 February 1956) was a Scottish footballer who played as a wing half in the English Football League for Bolton Wanderers and Preston North End. He also played in the Scottish League for Dundee, in the Southern League for Millwall Athletic and Watford, in the Irish League for Distillery, and in English non-league football for Darlington and Gravesend United. He played representative football for both the Southern League and Irish League teams.
