= Billy Gilligan =

Scottish footballer

Personal information
- Full name: William Anderson Gilligan
- Date of birth: 1876
- Place of birth: Dundee, Scotland
- Date of death: 1914 (aged 37–38)
- Position: Wing half

Senior career*
Years	Team	Apps	(Gls)
–	East Craigie		
1898	Dundee	4	(0)
1898	Derby County		
1898–1899	Bolton Wanderers	3	(0)
Total		7	(0)
- * Club domestic league appearances and goals

William Anderson Gilligan (1876–1914) was a Scottish footballer who played in the Scottish Football League for Dundee and in the Football League for Bolton Wanderers.

He was one of four brothers who were professional footballers, the others being Sandy, Sam and John.
