= Sam Gilligan =

Scottish footballer and manager (1882–1965)

- Gilligan pictured in 1907

Personal information
- Full name: Samuel Anderson Gilligan
- Date of birth: 18 January 1882
- Place of birth: Dundee, Scotland
- Date of death: 17 June 1965 (aged 83)
- Place of death: Youngstown, Ohio, U.S.
- Height: 5 ft 9 1/2 in (1.77 m)
- Position: Centre forward

Youth career
- Dalry

Senior career*
Years	Team	Apps	(Gls)
1898–1901	Belmont Athletic		
1901–1902	Dundee Violet		
1902–1903	Dundee	9	(3)
1903–1904	Celtic	14	(15)
1904–1910	Bristol City	188	(78)
1910–1913	Liverpool	40	(16)
1913–1915	Gillingham	65	(15)
1917	Dundee Hibernian	0	(0)
- Forfar Athletic
1921	Dundee Hibernian	1	(0)
Total		317	(127)

Managerial career
- 1913–1915: Gillingham
- * Club domestic league appearances and goals

Samuel Anderson Gilligan (18 January 1882 – 17 June 1965) was a Scottish professional association football player in the years prior to the First World War who played as a forward. He made over 200 appearances in The Football League for Bristol City and Liverpool, and a smaller number of appearances in the Scottish Football League with Dundee and Celtic.

== Career ==
Born in Dundee, Gilligan was initially an apprentice shipyard riveter, switching skills to become a professional footballer. He began his career at Belmont Athletic and then Dundee Violet before moving up to Dundee FC in 1902. He played in only nine matches, scoring three times and played in three Scottish FA Cup matches. He signed for Celtic for the 1903-04 season and again his appearances were sporadic. Gilligan losing out to the preferred forward and future star Jimmy Quinn, despite his 15 goals in 14 league appearances including a hat-trick against Port Glasgow Athletic. He also played in the Glasgow Cup Final and the replay which Celtic lost against Third Lanark.

Gilligan moved south to play for English second division side Bristol City, becoming a huge success and a fans favourite. In six years at the club he made 188 league appearances scoring 78 goals for City and played in the 1909 FA Cup Final. His first season saw him score 14 in 30 league games and then scored 20 in 37 league matches as City won the second division. The 1906-07 season in division 1 saw newcomers Bristol City finish runners-up, three points behind Newcastle United, Gilligan chipping in with 15 goals. He also scored 9 goals in 23 FA Cup matches. Three of those goals helping the Robins reach the 1908-09 FA Cup Final, that they lost 1-0 against Manchester United.

He joined Liverpool in 1910, scoring the goal which saved the club from being relegated from the top tier in the 1911–12 season. After three years at Anfield, he joined Gillingham of the Southern Football League as player-manager. In his first season in charge, Gillingham secured their best position in the league for three years. He scored 15 goals in 65 appearances for the Kent club, his last goal coming in a 2-1 defeat against Bristol Rovers. The outbreak of the First World War ended his UK football career; although some records show a Gilligan played for Dundee Hibernians and Forfar, later reports make no mention of these clubs as it seems unlikely to be the same player. After the First World War Gilligan returned to Scotland, working at a shipbuilders in Dundee.

In October 1923, he embarked on the start of a new life in America, sailing from Glasgow to Boston, settling in Youngstown, Ohio. Gilligan worked as an attendant at the Butler Institute of American Art while waiting for his wife and children to join him. During this period he became player manager of Mahoning Valleys, a Youngstown based football team. He would later become a foreman at the Republic Iron and Steel Company until his retirement. He continued playing football until 1932, aged 50 and was still involved in the game until the outbreak of the Second World War. In 1942, at the age of 60, he registered for the US Draft but was never called up.

Gilligan died in June 1965, aged 83.

== Playing style ==
A matchday programme from 1910 described him as: "a player who can adapt himself to any position on the field".

== Personal life ==
He was one of four brothers who were professional footballers, the others being Sandy, Billy and John. Sam was the only brother not to play for East Craigie, opting for Dundee Violet instead. His elder brothers Sandy and Billy both played in England for Bolton Wanderers, Billy also played for Derby County. Sandy later became the manager of East Craigie.

== Honours ==
Bristol City

- Football League Second Division champion: 1905–06
- Football League First Division runner-up: 1906–07
- FA Cup runner-up: 1909
