= John Gilligan (footballer, born 1884) =

Scottish footballer

Personal information
- Full name: John Ross Gilligan
- Date of birth: 1884
- Place of birth: Dundee, Scotland
- Date of death: 1946 (aged 61–62)
- Place of death: Dundee, Scotland
- Position: Defender

Senior career*
Years	Team	Apps	(Gls)
- East Craigie
- Dundee Wanderers
1904	Partick Thistle	1	(0)
1904–1918	Clyde	269	(0)
- * Club domestic league appearances and goals

John Ross Gilligan (1884–1946) was a Scottish footballer who played as a defender, almost solely for Clyde.

In his first season with the club (having quickly moved on from his first professional appointment on the other side of Glasgow at Partick Thistle), he won the 1904–05 Scottish Division Two title. The team was relegated, but gained promotion again in 1906 and retained their place in the top tier for the rest of his time there, including two third-place finishes which equal their all-time highest placings. He also played in the 1912 Scottish Cup Final which Clyde lost to Celtic.

The sole representative honour Gilligan received was a selection for the Glasgow Football Association's annual challenge match against Sheffield in 1909. In 1911 he was granted a benefit match against his hometown club Dundee.

He was the youngest of four brothers who were professional footballers, the others being Sandy, Billy and Sam.
