= USS Gilligan =

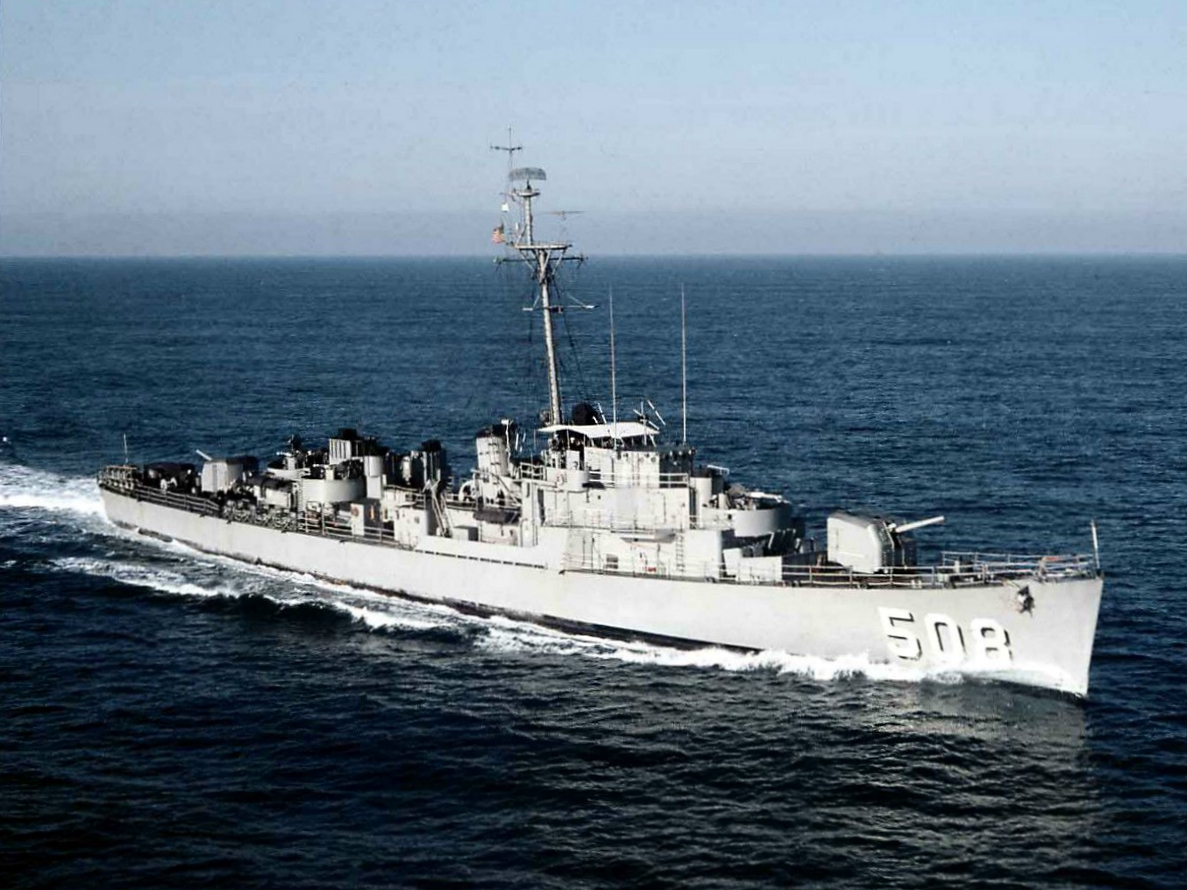

History

United States
- Laid down: 18 November 1943
- Launched: 22 February 1944
- Commissioned: 12 May 1944
- Decommissioned: 2 July 1946
- In service: NRT, 13th Naval District, August 1950
- Out of service: 31 March 1959
- Stricken: 1 March 1972
- Fate: Sold for scrapping 20 November 1973

General characteristics
- Displacement: 1,350 long tons (1,372 t)
- Length: 306 ft (93 m) overall
- Beam: 36 ft 10 in (11.23 m)
- Draught: 13 ft 4 in (4.06 m) maximum
- Propulsion: 2 boilers, 2 geared steam turbines, 12,000 shp, 2 screws
- Speed: 24 knots (44 km/h)
- Range: 6,000 nm @ 12 knots (22 km/h)
- Complement: 14 officers, 201 enlisted
- Armament: 2-5 in (130 mm), 4 (2 × 2) 40 mm AA, 10-20 mm guns AA, 3-21 inch (533 mm) torpedo tubes, 1 Hedgehog, 8 depth charge projectors, 2 depth charge tracks

USS Gilligan (DE-508) was a John C. Butler-class destroyer escort acquired by the U.S. Navy during World War II. The primary purpose of the destroyer escort was to escort and protect ships in convoy, in addition to other tasks as assigned, such as patrol or radar picket. After the war, she returned home with one battle star to her credit.

Gilligan (DE-508) was named in honor of John Joseph Gilligan Jr., who was awarded the Silver Star for his bravery on Tulagi, in the Solomon Islands.

== Namesake ==
John Joseph Gilligan Jr. was born on 17 June 1923 in Newark, New Jersey. He enlisted in the Marine Corps Reserve on 8 January 1942 and served at Parris Island, South Carolina, and Quantico, Virginia. Gilligan was mortally wounded in action while serving with the First Marine Raider Battalion at Tulagi, Solomon Islands, on 7 August 1942 and died the next day. For his heroism under fire, he was posthumously awarded the Silver Star.

== Service history ==
Gilligan was launched 22 February 1944 by the Federal Shipbuilding & Drydock Co., Newark, New Jersey; sponsored by Mrs. John J. Gilligan, the namesake's mother; and commissioned 12 May 1944. Following shakedown off Bermuda, Gilligan escorted a troopship from New York to Maine and sailed from Norfolk, Virginia, 5 August 1944 to escort an LSD to Pearl Harbor, arriving 30 August. Underway 29 September to escort merchantmen to Eniwetok, she put in at Majuro 13 October and from 16 to 27 October 1944 escorted merchantmen to Kwajalein, bombarded Mille Atoll and Jaluit Island, and sank a 50-foot (15 m) Japanese schooner, before returning to Majuro the latter date.

Gilligan sailed 1 November to escort merchantmen to Eniwetok and Saipan, subsequently mooring at Ulithi 17 November. Three days later, on 20 November, fleet oiler Mississinewa (AO-59)—loaded with more than 400,000 gallons of aviation gasoline—was torpedoed inside Ulithi lagoon with a loss of 50 officers and men. Seconds later, Gilligan saw a miniature Japanese submarine pass close alongside. Her crew dropped depth charges within the lagoon and possibly damaged one midget submarine. Destroyer Case (DD-370) rammed and sank another outside the harbor, and Marine planes finished off a third the same day. Gilligan sailed 4 December as a steamship escort to Manus and conducted patrols off Bougainville from that port until 31 December 1944 when she departed Manus to escort troopships bound for Lingayen Gulf, arriving in time for D-Day, 9 January 1945. Although in constant danger from enemy air attacks, the destroyer escort supported the assault, screened for Attack Group Able of VADM Wilkinson's Task Force 79, and made smoke.

Gilligan came under kamikaze attack 12 January. A sailor under fire from the attacking plane leaped from his post onto the main battery director and threw it off target, a mistake which prevented the 5-inch guns from getting off more than 1 round although it was able to fire an additional 13 rounds thirty minutes later at a second plane that dived into the USS Suesens (DE-342). The kamikaze crashed directly into the muzzles of Gilligan's No. 2 40 mm gun, killing 12 men (10 missing in action, 1 killed in action, and 1 who died of his injuries shortly after the attack) and wounding 13, and started raging fires. One of the survivor of the attack William Stewart was awarded a Silver Star, a Medal awarded primarily to members of the United States Armed Forces for gallantry in action against an enemy of the United States. The day after the attack Commander of the U.S.S. Gilligan Carl E. Bull wrote to William Stewart wife, Virginia : "You can be very proud of your husband. He knew he was facing almost certain death and yet remained at his post and continued to direct the fire of his battery until the enemy was destroyed. By some miracle, perhaps your prayers in love, he was the only survivor of all his men. Even after it was over he talked cooly and calmly of getting well and back to the ship. It was a privilege and a pleasure to have been his commanding officer. I am recommending him for the Silver Star award for bravery in action. His conduct was in keeping with the highest traditions of the U.S. Naval Service." Outstanding damage control kept the ship seaworthy; she put in at Leyte 17 January for repairs, subsequently reaching Pearl Harbor 21 February for overhaul.

Gilligan sailed again 29 March 1945 as an antisubmarine convoy escort and closed the western beaches of Okinawa 17 April to commence antiaircraft and antisubmarine screening around the transport anchorage. The Japanese were at this time using every conceivable means—kamikazes, submarines, swimmers, and motor boats—to destroy the assembled ships. In spite of heavy air attacks she engaged in screening and escort duties for transports, splashed at least five attacking planes, and possibly damaged a submarine. On 27 May her luck almost ran out; a torpedo bomber hit her solidly with a torpedo, but it was a dud. Gilligan returned to Ulithi 25 June and sailed again 6 July on merchantmen escort duty to Leyte and Hollandia and subsequently closed Manila where she was attached to the Philippine Sea Frontier.

On 16 August she sailed to escort merchantmen to Okinawa, returning to Manila 27 August, and repeated this voyage 29 August – 25 September 1945. Underway from Manila 5 November, Gilligan reached San Pedro, Los Angeles, 26 November for overhaul. She was towed to San Diego 14 April 1946 and was placed out of commission in reserve at that port 2 July 1946. Gilligan recommissioned in reserve 15 July 1950 at Seattle, Washington, and conducting reserve cruises in Pacific Northwest waters, and voyages thence to the Fleet Sonar School at San Diego. She made two training cruises to Hawaii, and one each to Acapulco, Mexico, the Panama Canal Zone and Alaska. She was also used for training in Portland, Oregon in 1958. She was decommissioned 31 March 1959 at Point Astoria, Oregon. Gilligan remained out of commission in reserve at Bremerton, Washington. On 1 March 1972, she was struck from the Navy list and, on 20 November 1973, she was sold for scrapping.

== Military awards ==
Gilligan earned one battle star for World War II service.
