= George Bowman (footballer) =

Scottish footballer (born 1872)

George Alexander Bowman (born 27 June 1872 in Montrose) was a Scottish footballer, who played for Montrose, Third Lanark and Scotland.
