= Dundee East End F.C. =

Former association football club in Scotland

Dundee East End
- Full name: Dundee East End Football Club
- Nicknames: The Wise Men, the Whites (after 1888)
- Founded: 1877
- Dissolved: 1893
- Ground: 1877–1882: Havecroft Park; 1882–1883: Clepington Park; 1883–1886: Madeira Park; 1886–1887: Pitkerro Park; 1887–1891: Clepington Park; 1891–1893: Carolina Port
Home colours

Dundee East End Football Club were a football club from Dundee, Scotland. The club were founded in 1877 but merged with Dundee Our Boys in 1893 to form Dundee.

== History ==
They joined the Northern League in 1891 and in January 1892 lost 5–3 to Montrose in the Forfarshire Cup Final. Initially the cup was withheld after Dundee East End protested concerning Montrose's late arrival at the game. However, the protest was not upheld and Montrose were declared winners. At the end of their first season in the Northern League they shared the title with their city rivals Dundee Our Boys.

Other honours included the Dundee Charity Cup (Burns Charity Cup) in 1889–90, 1891–92 and 1892–93. The club also managed to reach the quarter finals of the Scottish Cup in 1889–90. Incredibly, East End lost 4 Forfarshire Cup finals in a row between 1888–89 to 1891–92.

In October 1892, East End played English side Sunderland in a friendly.

=== Scottish Cup history ===
East End's first appearance in the Scottish Cup came in the 1882–83 season, losing 4–3 away to Arbroath in the first round. In 1883–84 they again lost in the first round, this time 1–0 away to local rivals Strathmore. Their first success in the Scottish Cup came in September 1884, an 8–1 home win against Coupar Angus. The following round saw them drawn again against Strathmore, where a 1–1 draw away from home was followed by a 5–2 home defeat.

In 1885–86 the first round saw them drawn at home to Strathmore. A 3–3 draw on 12 September 1885 was followed by a 4–1 away victory a week later. In the second round they drew 2–2 at home to Broughty, initially winning the replay 8–2, although the match was declared void. East End won the replayed game 2–1 and progressed to a third round tie away to Arbroath. Arbroath were too strong for East End, who bowed out with a 7–1 away defeat.

The first round of the 1886–87 tournament saw them drawn against Aberdeen, although East End were awarded the game as a walkover. A 5–4 home win against Broughty was followed by a 3–3 draw in the third round at home to Dunblane. East End withdrew from the replay.

In the first round of the 1887–88 tournament, East End won 13–1 away to Strathmore in the first round, but subsequently went out with a 3–2 defeat away to Lindertis Kirriemuir in the next round. The following season saw a 5–4 defeat away to local rivals Our Boys in the first round.

The 1889–90 cup run began with a 6–1 win away to Broughty in the first round, followed by a 2–0 win away to Dundee Wanderers in the second. They were drawn away to Our Boys in the third round and won 3–2. The fourth round saw them drawn at home to Cambuslang. They won 3–2, but the game was declared void. However, East End won again by the same scoreline two weeks later to book their place in the fifth round for the first time. They drew 2–2 away to Moffat, winning the replay 5–1 to earn a quarter-final tie away to Vale of Leven. East End lost 4–0 and Vale of Leven went on to reach the final, where they lost in a replay to Queen's Park.

The following season saw East End start in the second round, their first round opponents Strathmore having withdrawn. A 4–2 win at home to St Johnstone was followed by a 4–0 defeat away to Our Boys in the third round. This was their final appearance in the Scottish Cup under their own name.

=== Merger with Our Boys ===
In June 1893, a proposal was made for Our Boys to merge with East End, with six members from each club to form a committee to create a new club. The committee met for the first time on 23 June 1893, at Mathers' Hotel in Dundee, with J. Petrie of East End being appointed chairman. The final match for the two clubs was against each other, six days later; a benefit match for the widow and family of a deceased member of both clubs, played at the Dundee Harp ground. The new club was called Dundee F.C. and it joined the Scottish League shortly afterwards.

== Colours ==
The club originally played in blue and white hooped shirts and stockings with white shorts, which Dundee sometimes adapts in honour of East End. From 1886 to 1888 the club played in chocolate and claret halves with black shorts, and thereafter wore white shirts, with black shorts until 1890 and blue shorts thereafter.

== Grounds ==
When East End were formed in 1877 they played at Havecroft Park. In July 1882 they secured the use of Clepington Park for the coming season. They moved again the following year, to Madeira Park, which was first used for a Scottish Cup match against Strathmore on 8 September 1883. In 1886 they moved to Pitkerro Park, returning to Clepington Park in 1887, where they remained until gaining entry into the Northern League in 1891 and moving to Carolina Port. In 1893 the newly formed Dundee F.C., upon their immediate election to the Scottish Football League, initially played on Our Boys' West Craigie Park ground; this lasted for only one season before they moved to Carolina Port. In 1899 Dundee moved to Dens Park where they remain to the present day. Another local side, Dundee Wanderers, played on East End's old Clepington Park ground from 1891 onwards; it later became Tannadice Park, home of Dundee United.

== See also ==
- Category:Dundee East End F.C. players
