= William Longair =

Scottish footballer

Personal information
- Full name: William Longair
- Date of birth: 19 July 1870
- Place of birth: Dundee, Scotland
- Date of death: 16 June 1926 (aged 55)
- Position: Half back

Youth career
- –1887: Rockwell High School

Senior career*
Years	Team	Apps	(Gls)
1887–1893	Dundee East End		
1893–1895	Dundee	34	(1)
1895	Newton Heath	1	(0)
1895–1896	Dundee	16	(1)
1896	Sunderland	2	(0)
1896–1897	Burnley	2	(0)
1897–1898	Dundee	11	(0)
1898	Brighton United		
1899–1902	Dundee	53	(1)
Total		119+	(3+)

International career
1894	Scotland	1	(0)
- * Club domestic league appearances and goals

William "Plum" Longair (19 July 1870 – 28 November 1926) was a Scottish footballer who played as a half-back for Dundee in the 1890s. When he retired from playing, he became the club's trainer for over two decades, and remained an influential figure at the club.

Born in Dundee, Longair began his football career with Dundee F.C. in the early 1890s. He made his debut for Scotland in March 1894, and signed for Newton Heath in February 1895. He played for Newton Heath for four months, making one appearance, before returning to Dundee in June 1895. Short spells at Sunderland and Burnley followed in the 1896–97 season, before he moved to Brighton United in 1898 after a brief return up north. He returned to Dundee once again in May 1899, retiring from football in 1902.

Longair would later go on to become the club's trainer and perform the role for over 20 years, including training the eventual 1910 Scottish Cup winners. Longair would also become Dundee's groundsman in 1924. Upon his death in 1926, a crowd of approximately 20,000 lined the streets as his coffin passed to honour his services to the club and the city.

His uncle, also named William Longair, was Lord Provost of the Burgh of Dundee from 1905 to 1908.

On 3 April 2009, Longair was inducted into Dundee's Hall of Fame (Heritage Award).
