= Sandy Gilligan =

Scottish footballer

Personal information
- Full name: Alexander Patterson Gilligan
- Date of birth: 1872
- Place of birth: Dundee, Scotland
- Date of death: 1952 (aged 79–80)
- Position: Inside forward

Senior career*
Years	Team	Apps	(Gls)
- East Craigie
1892–1893	Dundee East End		
1893–1895	Dundee	40	(13)
1894	→ Bolton Wanderers (loan)	1	(0)
1895–1900	Bolton Wanderers	98	(17)
Total		131	(29)
- * Club domestic league appearances and goals

Alexander Patterson Gilligan (1872 – 1952) was a Scottish footballer who played in the Scottish Football League for Dundee (being among the first players to play for the club following its formation in 1893, and the scorer of the first league goal) and in the English Football League for Bolton Wanderers.

He was the eldest of four brothers who were professional footballers, the others being Billy, Sam and John.
