= William Thomson (Dundee footballer) =

Scottish footballer

Personal information
- Full name: William Thomson
- Date of birth: 29 April 1874
- Place of birth: Dundee, Scotland
- Date of death: 12 December 1917 (aged 43)
- Place of death: Greenock, Scotland
- Position: Right winger

Youth career
- 1891–1892: Clydemore

Senior career*
Years	Team	Apps	(Gls)
1892–1893	Dundee Our Boys		
1893–1896	Dundee	50	(9)
1896–1899	Bolton Wanderers	45	(5)
1899	Victoria United		
1899–1900	Bristol City		
Total		95	(14)

International career
1896	Scotland	1	(0)
- * Club domestic league appearances and goals

William Thomson (29 April 1874 – 12 December 1917) was a Scottish footballer who played as a right winger.

== Career ==
Born in Dundee, Thomson played club football in the Scottish Football League for Dundee, and in the English Football League for Bolton Wanderers. He made one appearance for Scotland in 1896.

He died in an accident while working as a shipyard engineer during World War I.
