= West Craigie Park =

Former sports venue in Dundee, Scotland

- Location within Dundee City council area
- Location: Dundee, Scotland
- Coordinates: 56.4703°N 2.9560°W
- Surface: Grass

Construction
- Opened: 1882

Tenants
- Dundee Our Boys (1882–1893); Dundee (1893)

West Craigie Park was a football ground in Dundee, Scotland. It was the home ground of Dundee Our Boys from 1882 until they merged with Dundee East End to form Dundee F.C. in 1893. It was used as the home ground of the new club until the end of 1893.

== History ==
Dundee Our Boys moved to West Craigie Park in 1882 after buying some farmland directly to the west of their previous Baxter Park ground. A stand was built, but burnt down in 1892. Until a replacement was built, a wooden hut was used as the changing rooms. It was used to host the final of the Forfarshire Cup in 1885–86 and 1886–87.

In 1893 Dundee Our Boys merged with Dundee East End to form Dundee, with the new club playing at West Craigie Park. Dundee joined the Scottish Football League later in the year, and the first SFL match was played at the ground on 12 August 1893 with 5,000 watching a 3–3 draw with Rangers. However, the club only played six more games at the ground before moving to Carolina Port at the end of the year. The last match was played on 9 December, with 5,000 watching a 4–0 win over Dumbarton. Dundee's highest league attendance at the ground was 8,000 for a 4–1 defeat by Celtic on 19 August.

A few years after Dundee left the ground, the site was redeveloped for housing.
