= Frank Barrett (footballer) =

Scottish footballer

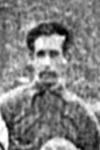

Personal information
- Full name: Francis Barrett
- Date of birth: 2 August 1872
- Place of birth: Dundee, Scotland
- Date of death: 22 March 1907 (aged 34)
- Position: Goalkeeper

Youth career
- ?–1893: Dundee Harp

Senior career*
| Years | Team | Apps | (Gls) |
| 1893–1896 | Dundee | 41 | (0) |
| 1896–1900 | Newton Heath | 118 | (0) |
| 1900–1901 | New Brighton Tower | 34 | (0) |
| 1901 | Arbroath | | |
| 1901–1902 | Manchester City | 5 | (0) |
| 1902–1903 | Dundee | 0 | (0) |
| 1903–1905 | Aberdeen | 20 | (0) |

International career
| 1894–1895 | Scotland | 2 | (0) |
- * Club domestic league appearances and goals

Francis Barrett (2 August 1872 – 22 March 1907) was a Scottish footballer, who played as a goalkeeper. He was born in Dundee.

== Club career ==
Barrett played for Dundee Harp before joining Dundee Football Club upon its foundation in 1893. While with the Dark Blues, he would make 49 total appearances for the club in their first three seasons, and would win two caps for Scotland in 1894 and 1895.

In September 1896, he signed with Newton Heath (now Manchester United). He made 132 appearances for the club, scoring no goals. In May 1900, he left for New Brighton Tower. In 1901, he briefly returned to Manchester, making eight appearances for Manchester City. In 1903, he became one of the founding players of Aberdeen Football Club.

== Death ==
He died in 1907, aged 35. After Barrett's death, Manchester United gifted £35 to his widow.
