= 1893–94 Scottish Division One =

1st season of top-tier football league in Scotland

Scottish Football League Division One
- Season: 1893–94
- Champions: Celtic; 2nd title
- Relegated: Renton
- Matches: 90
- Goals: 421 (4.68 per match)
- Top goalscorer: Sandy McMahon (16 goals)

The 1893–94 Scottish Division One season was the first season in which the Scottish Football League had been split between two divisions. The league championship was won by Celtic, three points ahead of nearest rival Heart of Midlothian.

== League table ==
Pos	Team	Pld	W	D	L	GF	GA	GD	Pts	Relegation
1	Celtic (C)	18	14	1	3	53	32	+21	29	Champions
2	Heart of Midlothian	18	11	4	3	46	32	+14	26	
3	St Bernard's	18	11	1	6	53	39	+14	23	
4	Rangers	18	8	4	6	44	30	+14	20	
5	Dumbarton	18	7	5	6	32	35	−3	19	
6	St Mirren	18	7	3	8	49	47	+2	17	
7	Third Lanark	18	7	3	8	38	44	−6	17	
8	Dundee	18	6	3	9	47	59	−12	15	
9	Leith Athletic	18	4	2	12	36	46	−10	10	
10	Renton (R)	18	1	2	15	23	57	−34	4	Relegated to the 1894–95 Scottish Division Two

Source: worldfootball.net, Scottish Professional Football League
Rules for classification: Points system: 2 points for a win, 1 point for a draw, 0 points for a loss.
(C) Champions; (R) Relegated

== Results ==
Home \ Away	CEL	DUM	DND	HOM	LEI	RAN	REN	STB	STM	THI
Celtic		0–0	3–1	2–3	4–1	3–2	3–2	5–2	5–1	5–0
Dumbarton	4–5		1–1	2–2	3–1	2–0	2–0	1–5	3–3	2–1
Dundee	1–4	4–0		2–5	4–3	3–3	8–1	1–3	0–3	1–1
Heart of Midlothian	2–4	2–1	3–0		0–2	4–2	5–1	2–4	1–1	2–2
Leith Athletic	5–0	2–4	3–5	2–2		2–2	2–1	4–2	2–5	2–3
Rangers	5–0	4–0	7–2	1–2	1–0		5–3	1–2	5–0	0–3
Renton	0–3	1–1	2–3	2–3	2–1	1–2		0–1	0–4	0–3
St Bernard's	1–2	2–1	3–5	1–2	3–2	0–0	4–2		8–3	6–2
St Mirren	1–2	1–2	10–3	2–3	3–1	2–2	4–2	1–3		4–2
Third Lanark	1–3	1–3	4–3	1–3	2–1	1–2	3–3	5–3	3–1	

Legend: Blue = home team win; Yellow = draw; Red = away team win.
