= 1897–98 Dundee F.C. season =

Dundee
1897–98 season
- Stadium: Carolina Port
- Division One: 7th
- Scottish Cup: Semi-finals
- Top goalscorer: League: Malcolm McVean & Davie Willocks (7); All: Davie Willocks (9)
Home colours

The 1897–98 season was the fifth season in which Dundee competed at a Scottish national level, playing in Division One and finishing in 7th place. Dundee would also compete in the Scottish Cup, where they would reach the semi-finals.

== Scottish Division One ==
Statistics provided by Dee Archive

| Match day | Date | Opponent | H/A | Score | Dundee scorer(s) | Attendance |
|---|---|---|---|---|---|---|
| 1 | 4 September | Clyde | H | 6–0 | McVean (3), Blyth, Devlin, Keillor | 3,000 |
| 2 | 11 September | St Bernard's | H | 0–0 | | 7,500 |
| 3 | 25 September | Partick Thistle | A | 1–3 | Willocks | 2,500 |
| 4 | 2 October | Third Lanark | H | 4–2 | Willocks, Devlin, McVean (2) | 4,000 |
| 5 | 9 October | St Mirren | A | 1–2 | Devlin | 5,000 |
| 6 | 16 October | Heart of Midlothian | H | 1–6 | Malloch | 4,000 |
| 7 | 23 October | Partick Thistle | H | 5–0 | Keillor, Willocks (2), McVean, Devlin | 4,000 |
| 8 | 30 October | Heart of Midlothian | A | 0–2 | | 7,000 |
| 9 | 6 November | Celtic | H | 1–2 | Blyth | 11,000 |
| 10 | 13 November | Hibernian | A | 0–2 | | 5,000 |
| 11 | 20 November | St Mirren | H | 0–0 | | 3,800 |
| 12 | 27 November | Clyde | A | 5–1 | Willocks (3), Findlay (o.g.), Clark | |
| 13 | 4 December | Hibernian | H | 1–1 | Pollock | 4,000 |
| 14 | 11 December | St Bernard's | A | 1–4 | McArthur | |
| 15 | 25 December | Rangers | A | 0–5 | | 6,000 |
| 16 | 15 January | Celtic | A | 1–2 | Battles | 6,000 |
| 17 | 22 January | Third Lanark | A | 0–3 | | 6,000 |
| 18 | 12 February | Rangers | H | 2–1 | Battles, McVean | 10,000 |

Having finished level on points with Partick Thistle, Dundee played them in a play-off match to determine ranking positions.

| Round | Date | Opponent | H/A | Score | Dundee scorer(s) | Attendance |
|---|---|---|---|---|---|---|
| 7th place play-off | 26 March | Partick Thistle | A | 2–0 | McArthur, Malloch | 3,000 |

=== League table ===
| Pos | Team | Pld | W | D | L | GF | GA | GD | Pts |
|---|---|---|---|---|---|---|---|---|---|
| 5 | St Mirren | 18 | 8 | 2 | 8 | 30 | 36 | −6 | 18 |
| 5 | Third Lanark | 18 | 8 | 2 | 8 | 37 | 38 | −1 | 18 |
| 7 | Dundee | 18 | 5 | 3 | 10 | 29 | 36 | −7 | 13 (Note: Dundee and Partick Thistle finished level on points but Dundee won a play-off match to determine ranking positions.) |
| 8 | Partick Thistle | 18 | 6 | 1 | 11 | 34 | 64 | −30 | 13 |
| 9 | St Bernard's | 18 | 4 | 1 | 13 | 35 | 67 | −32 | 9 |

Source: statto.com
Rules for classification: Teams finish equal if level on points. Points system: 2 points for a win, 1 point for a draw, 0 points for a loss

== Scottish Cup ==
Statistics provided by Dee Archive

| Round | Date | Opponent | H/A | Score | Dundee scorer(s) | Attendance |
|---|---|---|---|---|---|---|
| 1st round | 8 January | Partick Thistle | H | 2–1 | Malloch, Willocks | 3,000 |
| 2nd round | 29 January | St Mirren | H | 2–0 | Kelso, McArthur | 5,000 |
| Quarter-finals | 5 February | Heart of Midlothian | H | 3–0 | Willocks, McArthur, Malloch | 8,000 |
| Semi-finals | 19 February | Kilmarnock | N | 2–3 | McVean, Malloch | 11,000 |

== Player statistics ==
Statistics provided by Dee Archive

| No. | Pos | Nat | Player | Total | | First Division | | Scottish Cup | |
| No. | Pos | Nat | Player | Apps | Goals | Apps | Goals | Apps | Goals |
|---|---|---|---|---|---|---|---|---|---|
| | DF | (Scotland) SCO | Barney Battles | 19 | 2 | 15 | 2 | 4 | 0 |
| | MF | (Scotland) SCO | Bob Blyth | 9 | 2 | 9 | 2 | 0 | 0 |
| | DF | (Scotland) SCO | Charlie Burgess | 17 | 0 | 13 | 0 | 4 | 0 |
| | FW | (Scotland) SCO | Joe Clark | 16 | 1 | 12 | 1 | 4 | 0 |
| | FW | (Scotland) SCO | Joe Devlin | 8 | 4 | 8 | 4 | 0 | 0 |
| | FW | (Scotland) SCO | George Ferguson | 2 | 0 | 2 | 0 | 0 | 0 |
| | MF | (Scotland) SCO | Robert Fleming | 3 | 0 | 3 | 0 | 0 | 0 |
| | FW | (Scotland) SCO | Bill Fullerton | 2 | 0 | 2 | 0 | 0 | 0 |
| | MF | (Scotland) SCO | Billy Gilligan | 7 | 0 | 4 | 0 | 3 | 0 |
| | FW | (Ireland) EIR | David Hannah | 2 | 0 | 2 | 0 | 0 | 0 |
| | GK | (England) ENG | Jack Hillman | 22 | 0 | 18 | 0 | 4 | 0 |
| | MF | (Scotland) SCO | Sandy Keillor | 18 | 2 | 17 | 2 | 1 | 0 |
| | DF | (Scotland) SCO | Bob Kelso | 21 | 1 | 17 | 0 | 4 | 1 |
| | MF | (Scotland) SCO | William Longair | 15 | 0 | 11 | 0 | 4 | 0 |
| | MF | (Scotland) SCO | John Low | 1 | 0 | 1 | 0 | 0 | 0 |
| | MF | (Scotland) SCO | John Madden | 4 | 0 | 4 | 0 | 0 | 0 |
| | FW | (Scotland) SCO | John Malloch | 17 | 5 | 13 | 2 | 4 | 3 |
| | FW | (Scotland) SCO | Bill McArthur | 19 | 4 | 15 | 2 | 4 | 2 |
| | DF | (Scotland) SCO | Bob McCulloch | 1 | 0 | 1 | 0 | 0 | 0 |
| | FW | (Scotland) SCO | Malcolm McVean | 21 | 8 | 17 | 7 | 4 | 1 |
| | FW | (Scotland) SCO | Jake Pollock | 6 | 1 | 6 | 1 | 0 | 0 |
| | GK | (Scotland) SCO | Tom Stewart | 1 | 0 | 1 | 0 | 0 | 0 |
| | FW | (Scotland) SCO | Davie Willocks | 22 | 9 | 18 | 7 | 4 | 2 |

== See also ==
- List of Dundee F.C. seasons
