= 1896–97 Dundee F.C. season =

Dundee
1896–97 season
- Stadium: Carolina Port
- Division One: 5th
- Scottish Cup: Quarter-finals
- Top goalscorer: League: Joe Clark (10); All: Davie Willocks (12)
Home colours

The 1896–97 season was the fourth season in which Dundee competed at a Scottish national level, playing in Division One, finishing in 5th place for the 2nd consecutive season. Dundee would also compete in the Scottish Cup. Dundee would switch their main kit colours from sky blue and white stripes to a white shirt and black shorts.

== Scottish Division One ==
Statistics provided by Dee Archive

Match day	Date	Opponent	H/A	Score	Dundee scorer(s)	Attendance
1	15 August	Heart of Midlothian	H	0–5		8,500
2	22 August	Hibernian	H	3–0	Clark (3)	6,000
3	29 August	Rangers	A	1–3	Smith	13,000
4	5 September	St Mirren	A	1–4	Willocks	4,000
5	12 September	Third Lanark	H	2–0	Clark, Willocks	3,500
6	19 September	Heart of Midlothian	A	2–2	McArthur, Smith	8,000
7	26 September	St Bernard's	H	4–1	Devlin (2), Kelso, McArthur	5,000
8	3 October	Celtic	H	2–2	Robertson, Willocks	17,000
9	10 October	Third Lanark	A	1–3	Smith	1,500
10	17 October	Abercorn	H	3–0	Willocks, Smith, McArthur	3,500
11	24 October	Clyde	A	2–0	Willocks, Clark	2,500
12	31 October	Hibernian	A	1–3	Clark	6,000
13	7 November	Clyde	H	1–0	Willocks	4,000
14	14 November	St Bernard's	A	1–2	McArthur	
15	28 November	Rangers	H	3–2	Devlin (2), Clark	8,000
16	12 December	St Mirren	H	3–2	Clark, Robertson (o.g.), Smith	5,000
17	16 January	Abercorn	A	7–1	Devlin (2), Smith, Willocks (2), Clark, Allan	2,000
18	29 February	Celtic	A	1–0	Clark	8,000

=== League table ===
Pos	Team	Pld	W	D	L	GF	GA	GD	Pts
3	Rangers	18	11	3	4	64	30	+34	25
4	Celtic	18	10	4	4	42	18	+24	24
5	Dundee	18	10	2	6	38	30	+8	22
6	St Mirren	18	9	1	8	38	29	+9	19
7	St Bernard's	18	7	0	11	32	40	−8	14

Source: statto.com
Rules for classification: Teams finish equal if level on points. Points system: 2 points for a win, 1 point for a draw, 0 points for a loss

== Scottish Cup ==
Statistics provided by Dee Archive

Round	Date	Opponent	H/A	Score	Dundee scorer(s)	Attendance
1st round	9 January	Inverness Thistle	H	7–1	Willocks (3), Smith, Devlin (2), Dundas	
2nd round	30 January	King's Park	H	5–0	Allan (3), Willocks, Devlin	2,000
Quarter-finals	13 February	Rangers	H	0–4		15,000

== Player statistics ==
Statistics provided by Dee Archive

No.	Pos	Nat	Player	Total		First Division		Scottish Cup	
No.	Pos	Nat	Player	Apps	Goals	Apps	Goals	Apps	Goals
	FW	(Scotland) SCO	Dicky Allan	11	4	8	1	3	3
	DF	(Scotland) SCO	Charlie Burgess	17	0	14	0	3	0
	FW	(Scotland) SCO	Joe Clark	19	10	16	10	3	0
	FW	(Scotland) SCO	Joe Devlin	21	9	18	6	3	3
	MF	(Scotland) SCO	James Dundas	11	1	9	0	2	1
	MF	(Scotland) SCO	Alex Epsie	2	0	2	0	0	0
	DF	(Scotland) SCO	Stuart Hall	20	0	17	0	3	0
	DF	(Scotland) SCO	Edward Hamilton	6	0	6	0	0	0
	GK	(England) ENG	Jack Hillman	20	0	18	0	2	0
	MF	(Scotland) SCO	Sandy Keillor	20	0	17	0	3	0
	DF	(Scotland) SCO	Bob Kelso	19	1	16	1	3	0
	FW	(Scotland) SCO	Bill McArthur	13	4	11	4	2	0
	FW	(Scotland) SCO	James Robertson	4	1	4	1	0	0
	FW	(Scotland) SCO	Jim Smith	20	7	17	6	3	1
	MF	(Scotland) SCO	Tom Stormont	8	0	8	0	0	0
	FW	(Scotland) SCO	Davie Willocks	20	12	17	8	3	4

== See also ==
- List of Dundee F.C. seasons
