= 1950–51 Yorkshire Football League =

Yorkshire Football League
- Season: 1950–51

The 1950–51 Yorkshire Football League was the 25th season in the history of the Yorkshire Football League.

== Division One ==
Yorkshire Football League Division One
- Season: 1950–51
- Champions: Sheffield Wednesday 'A'
- Relegated: Brodsworth Main; Halifax Town 'A'; Huddersfield Town 'A'

The division featured 4 new teams:

- Beighton Miners Welfare, promoted from Division Two
- Dinnington Athletic, promoted from Division Two
- Retford Town, promoted from Division Two
- Scarborough reserves, promoted from Division Two

=== Map ===
Location of the clubs in the 1950–51 Yorkshire League Division One on a map of Yorkshire and the Humber

=== League table ===
Pos	Team	Pld	W	D	L	GF	GA	GD	Pts	Qualification or relegation
1	Sheffield Wednesday 'A' (C)	34	24	4	6	101	47	+54	52	
2	Selby Town	34	22	2	10	103	68	+35	46	
3	Beighton Miners Welfare	34	21	3	10	95	58	+37	45	
4	Scarborough reserves	34	20	4	10	86	57	+29	44	
5	Goole Town reserves	34	19	4	11	77	51	+26	42	
6	Ossett Town	34	20	2	12	93	65	+28	42	
7	Gainsborough Trinity reserves	34	13	10	11	87	86	+1	36	
8	Retford Town	34	15	5	14	60	44	+16	35	
9	Yorkshire Amateur	34	15	4	15	67	68	−1	34	
10	Barnsley 'A'	34	13	7	14	56	44	+12	33	
11	Wombwell Athletic	34	12	8	14	71	82	−11	32	
12	Rotherham United 'A'	34	13	5	16	72	61	+11	31	
13	Sheffield United 'A'	34	10	10	14	61	64	−3	30	
14	Leeds United 'A'	34	12	2	20	68	104	−36	26	
15	Huddersfield Town 'A' (R)	34	11	3	20	61	87	−26	25	Relegation to Division Two
16	Dinnington Athletic	34	7	9	18	55	107	−52	23	Resigned
17	Brodsworth Main (R)	34	6	8	20	52	96	−44	20	Relegation to Division Two
18	Halifax Town 'A' (R)	34	6	4	24	44	120	−76	16	Relegation to Division Two

Rules for classification: 1) points; 2) goal difference; 3) number of goals scored.
The points system until the 1990–91 season: 2 points for a win, 1 point for a draw and 0 points for losing.
(C) Champions; (R) Relegated

== Division Two ==
Yorkshire Football League Division Two
- Season: 1950-51
- Champions: Retford Town
- Promoted: Beighton Miners Welfare; Dinnington Athletic; Retford Town; Scarborough reserves

The division featured 3 new teams:

- Bradford United, joined from ??
- Chesterfield 'A', relegated from Division One
- Thorne Colliery, relegated from Division One

=== Map ===
Location of the clubs in the 1950–51 Yorkshire League Division Two on a map of Yorkshire and the Humber

=== League table ===
Pos	Team	Pld	W	D	L	GF	GA	GD	Pts	Qualification or relegation
1	Stocksbridge Works (C, P)	32	23	5	4	106	30	+76	51	Promotion to Division One
2	Worksop Town reserves (P)	32	22	5	5	94	51	+43	49	Promotion to Division One
3	Hull City 'A' (P)	32	20	5	7	77	50	+27	45	Promotion to Division One
4	Norton Woodseats (P)	32	19	5	8	75	33	+42	43	Promotion to Division One
5	Bentley Colliery	32	20	3	9	105	63	+42	43	
6	Chesterfield 'A'	32	17	7	8	102	51	+51	41	
7	Sheffield	32	16	5	11	85	55	+30	37	
8	Farsley Celtic	32	16	4	12	77	67	+10	36	
9	Bradford United	32	15	3	14	78	58	+20	33	Resigned
10	Doncaster Rovers 'A'	32	13	7	12	66	58	+8	33	
11	Thorne Colliery	32	15	3	14	74	89	−15	33	
12	Frickley Colliery reserves	32	10	8	14	50	60	−10	28	
13	Bradford Park Avenue 'A'	32	8	2	22	39	99	−60	18	
14	South Kirkby Colliery	32	7	3	22	49	84	−35	17	
15	Kiveton Park Colliery	32	5	3	24	48	109	−61	13	Resigned
16	York City 'A'	32	5	3	24	43	125	−82	13	Resigned
17	Maltby Main	32	3	5	24	32	118	−86	11	

Rules for classification: 1) points; 2) goal difference; 3) number of goals scored.
The points system until the 1990–91 season: 2 points for a win, 1 point for a draw and 0 points for losing.
(C) Champions; (P) Promoted

== League Cup ==
1950–51 Yorkshire Football League League Cup
Tournament details
- Country: England

=== Third Round ===
3 March 1951	Norton Woodseats	3–1	Scarborough reserves

26 March 1951	Sheffield Wednesday 'A'	2–0	Doncaster Rovers 'A'

–

–

=== Semi-finals ===
16 April 1951	Norton Woodseats	0–3	Sheffield Wednesday 'A'

21 April 1951	Farsley Celtic	4–2	Selby Town

=== Final ===
7 May 1951	Sheffield Wednesday 'A'	3–0	Farsley Celtic	Hillsborough
