= Barney Battles =

Barney Battles may refer to:

- Barney Battles Sr. (1875–1905), Scottish international football player
- Barney Battles Jr. (1905–1979), his son, also a football player, who represented the national teams of both Scotland and the United States
