= George Ferguson =

George Ferguson may refer to:

- George Ferguson (colonial administrator) (1748–1820), 4th Laird of Pitfour
- George Ferguson (Royal Navy officer) (1788–1867), Scottish admiral and Member of Parliament
- G. E. Ferguson (1864–1897), Fante government official in the British colony Gold Coast
- George Howard Ferguson (1870–1946), Canadian politician
- George Ferguson (actor) (1890–1961), American stage and silent film actor
- George Ferguson (cricketer) (1912–1995), Argentine cricketer
- George Ferguson (politician) (born 1947), British architect and first elected mayor of Bristol
- George Ferguson (ice hockey) (1952–2019), Canadian ice hockey player
- George Ferguson (footballer, fl. 1946–1954), Scottish footballer
- George Ferguson (footballer, born 1872) (1872–1898), Scottish footballer
- George Ferguson (bowls), Scottish bowls player

== See also ==
- George Fergusson (disambiguation)
