= 1993–94 Carlisle United F.C. season =

Carlisle United F.C.
1993–94 season
- Chairman: Michael Knighton
- Manager: Mick Wadsworth
- Stadium: Brunton Park
- Third Division: 7th
- FA Cup: Third round
- League Cup: First round
- Football League Trophy: Area final

For the 1993–94 season, Carlisle United F.C. competed in Football League Division Three.

== Results & fixtures ==
=== Football League Third Division ===
==== League table ====
Pos	Team	Pld	W	D	L	GF	GA	GD	Pts	Promotion or relegation
5	Preston North End	42	18	13	11	79	60	+19	67	Qualification for the Third Division play-offs
6	Torquay United	42	17	16	9	64	56	+8	67	Qualification for the Third Division play-offs
7	Carlisle United	42	18	10	14	57	42	+15	64	Qualification for the Third Division play-offs
8	Chesterfield	42	16	14	12	55	48	+7	62	
9	Rochdale	42	16	12	14	63	51	+12	60	

==== Matches ====
Match Day	Date	Opponent	H/A	Score	Carlisle United Scorer(s)	Attendance
1	14 August	Wycombe Wanderers	H	2–2		
2	17 August	Doncaster Rovers	A	0–0		
3	28 August	Rochdale	H	0–1		
4	31 August	Torquay United	A	1–1		
5	4 September	Scarborough	A	3–0		
6	11 September	Chesterfield	H	3–0		
7	18 September	Scunthorpe United	A	1–2		
8	25 September	Chester City	A	0–0		
9	2 October	Gillingham	H	1–2		
10	9 October	Shrewsbury Town	A	0–1		
11	16 October	Mansfield Town	H	1–1		
12	23 October	Northampton Town	A	1–1		
13	30 October	Walsall	H	2–1		
14	2 November	Lincoln City	H	3–3		
15	6 November	Wigan Athletic	A	2–0		
16	20 November	Preston North End	H	0–1		
17	27 November	Colchester United	A	1–2		
18	11 December	Doncaster Rovers	H	4–2		
19	18 December	Wycombe Wanderers	A	0–2		
20	27 December	Darlington	A	3–1		
21	28 December	Crewe Alexandra	H	1–2		
22	1 January	Hereford United	A	0–0		
23	3 January	Torquay United	H	1–1		
24	15 January	Mansfield Town	A	1–0		
25	25 January	Bury	H	1–2		
26	29 January	Walsall	A	1–0		4,883
27	5 February	Northampton Town	H	0–1		
28	12 February	Bury	A	1–2		
29	19 February	Rochdale	A	1–0		
30	26 February	Scarborough	H	2–0		
31	5 March	Chesterfield	A	0–3		
32	12 March	Scunthorpe United	H	3–1		
33	19 March	Chester City	H	1–0		
34	26 March	Gillingham	A	0–2		
35	2 April	Darlington	H	2–0		
36	4 April	Crewe Alexandra	A	3–2		
37	9 April	Hereford United	H	1–2		
38	16 April	Lincoln City	A	0–0		
39	23 April	Wigan Athletic	H	3–0		
40	30 April	Preston North End	A	3–0		
41	3 May	Shrewsbury Town	H	2–1		
42	7 May	Colchester United	H	2–0		

==== Football League play-offs ====
Round	Date	Opponent	H/A	Score	Carlisle United Scorer(s)	Attendance
SF L1	15 May	Wycombe Wanderers	H	0–2		10,862
SF L2	18 May	Wycombe Wanderers	A	1–2		5,265

=== Football League Cup ===
Round	Date	Opponent	H/A	Score	Carlisle United Scorer(s)	Attendance
R1 L1	17 August	Chesterfield	A	1–3		
R1 L2	24 August	Chesterfield	H	1–1		

=== FA Cup ===
Round	Date	Opponent	H/A	Score	Carlisle United Scorer(s)	Attendance
R1	13 November	Knowsley United	A	4–1		
R2	4 December	Stalybridge Celtic	H	3–1		
R3	8 January	Sunderland	A	1–1		
R3R	18 January	Sunderland	H	0–1		

=== Football League Trophy ===
Round	Date	Opponent	H/A	Score	Carlisle United Scorer(s)	Attendance
GS	28 September	Preston North End	H	1–2		
GS	9 November	Burnley	A	2–1		
R2	30 November	Bury	H	2–1		
QF	11 January	Mansfield Town	H	2–1 (aet)		
SF	8 February	Lincoln City	H	2–1 (aet)		
F L1 (North)	8 March	Huddersfield Town	A	1–4		
F L2 (North)	22 March	Huddersfield Town	H	2–0		
