= 1998–99 Carlisle United F.C. season =

Carlisle United F.C.
1998–99 season
- Chairman: Michael Knighton
- Manager: Michael Knighton; Nigel Pearson
- Stadium: Brunton Park
- Third Division: 23rd
- FA Cup: First round
- League Cup: First round
- Football League Trophy: Quarter-final

For the 1998–99 season, Carlisle United F.C. competed in Football League Division Three. This season for Carlisle is known for the final day of the season for when Jimmy Glass a goalkeeper signed on an emergency loan from Swindon Town FC (Due to the current goalkeeper being sold) scored on the final day of the season which kept Carlisle in the Football League.

== Results & fixtures ==
=== Football League Third Division ===
==== League table ====
Pos	Team	Pld	W	D	L	GF	GA	GD	Pts	Promotion or relegation
20	Torquay United	46	12	17	17	47	58	−11	53	
21	Hull City	46	14	11	21	44	62	−18	53	
22	Hartlepool United	46	13	12	21	52	65	−13	51	
23	Carlisle United	46	11	16	19	43	53	−10	49	
24	Scarborough (R)	46	14	6	26	50	77	−27	48	Relegation to Football Conference

Rules for classification: 1) Points; 2) Goals scored; 3) Goal difference
(R) Relegated

==== Matches ====
Match Day	Date	Opponent	H/A	Score	Carlisle United Scorer(s)	Attendance	Report
1	8 August	Brighton and Hove Albion	H	1–0		5,184	
2	15 August	Scunthorpe United	A	1–3		2,810	
3	22 August	Rochdale	H	0–1		3,627	
4	29 August	Exeter City	A	0–2		2,661	
5	1 September	Southend United	H	3–0		2,638	
6	5 September	Leyton Orient	A	1–2		3,730	
7	8 September	Swansea City	H	1–2		2,816	
8	12 September	Mansfield Town	A	1–1		2,292	
9	19 September	Chester City	H	1–1		2,971	
10	26 September	Shrewsbury Town	A	1–1		2,180	
11	3 October	Barnet	H	2–1		2,834	
12	9 October	Scarborough	H	1–0		3,502	
13	17 October	Torquay United	A	2–2		2,211	
14	20 October	Peterborough United	A	1–0		3,785	
15	7 November	Halifax Town	H	0–1		3,636	
16	21 November	Rotherham United	H	0–0		3,281	
17	28 November	Hull City	A	0–1		4,452	
18	1 December	Cardiff City	H	0–1		2,700	
19	12 December	Hartlepool United	H	2–1		3,025	
20	19 December	Plymouth Argyle	A	0–2		4,236	
21	26 December	Rochdale	A	1–1		2,900	
22	28 December	Cambridge United	H	1–1		4,419	
23	2 January	Exeter City	H	1–3		3,340	
24	9 January	Brighton and Hove Albion	A	3–1		4,163	
25	16 January	Scunthorpe United	H	0–1		3,044	
26	23 January	Southend United	A	1–0		4,120	
27	30 January	Cambridge United	A	0–1		4,128	
28	2 February	Brentford	A	1–1		3,674	
29	6 February	Leyton Orient	H	1–1		2,794	
30	13 February	Swansea City	A	1–1		4,753	
31	20 February	Mansfield Town	H	0–0		2,273	
32	27 February	Chester City	A	1–2		2,450	
33	6 March	Shrewsbury Town	H	2–1		2,501	
34	9 March	Barnet	A	0–1		1,428	
35	13 March	Halifax Town	A	0–1		2,432	
36	20 March	Brentford	H	0–1		2,564	
37	23 March	Darlington	A	1–1		3,028	
38	27 March	Cardiff City	A	1–2		7,094	
39	3 April	Torquay United	H	3–0		3,765	
40	5 April	Scarborough	A	0–3		3,604	
41	10 April	Peterborough United	H	1–1		3,064	
42	13 April	Hull City	H	0–0		3,743	
43	17 April	Rotherham United	A	1–3		4,267	
44	24 April	Darlington	H	3–3		3,808	
45	1 May	Hartlepool United	A	0–0		4,468	
46	8 May	Plymouth Argyle	H	2–1		7,599	

=== Football League Cup ===
Round	Date	Opponent	H/A	Score	Carlisle United Scorer(s)	Attendance	Report
R1 L1	11 August	Tranmere Rovers	A	0–3		5,116	
R1 L2	18 August	Tranmere Rovers	H	0–1		2,106	

=== FA Cup ===
Round	Date	Opponent	H/A	Score	Carlisle United Scorer(s)	Attendance	Report
R1	14 November	Hartlepool United	A	1–2		2,845	

=== Football League Trophy ===
Round	Date	Opponent	H/A	Score	Carlisle United Scorer(s)	Attendance	Report
R2	19 January	Scunthorpe United	A	1–1 (Carlisle win 4-3 on penalties)		1,507	
QF	26 January	Wigan Athletic	H	0–3		2,383	
