= West Riding County Cup =

- Organiser(s): West Riding County FA
- Founded: 1927; 99 years ago
- Region: West Riding of Yorkshire
- Current champions: Tadcaster Albion (1st title)
- Most championships: Goole Town (13 titles)
- Website: West Riding County FA

The West Riding County Cup is an annual football competition held between the clubs of the West Riding County Football Association which was first competed in 1927. It is the senior county cup for the historic West Riding of Yorkshire since the demise of the Senior Cup in 1999. The first winners were Leeds United Reserves in 1927.

According to the Rules of the County FA, entry to the competition is by invite from the Council or an authorised committee assigned to run the competition.

The competition was not held between 1933 and 1950.

== Finals ==
This section lists every final of the competition played since 1893, the winners, the runners-up, and the result.

=== Key ===
Match went to a replay
Match went to extra time
Match decided by a penalty shootout after extra time
Shared trophy

=== List of finals ===
Season	Winners	Result	Runner-up	Venue	Notes
1927	Leeds United reserves				
1928	Selby Town				
1929	Bradford (Park Avenue) reserves				
1930	Bradford City reserves				
1931	Huddersfield Town reserves				
1932	Not held.				
1933	Huddersfield Town reserves				
1933–49	Not held.				
1949–50	Bradford United Amateurs				
1950–51	Goole Town				
1951–52	Goole Town				
1952–53	Swillington Miners Welfare				
1953–54	Yorkshire Amateur				
1954–55	Salts				
1955–56	Salts				
1956–57	Goole Town				
1957–58	Farsley Celtic				
1958–59	Ossett Town				
1959–60	Farsley Celtic				
1960–61	Yorkshire Amateur				
1961–62	Hatfield Main				
1962–63	Harrogate Town				
1963–64	Hatfield Main				
1964–65	Ossett Albion				
1965–66	Ossett Albion				
1966–67	Farsley Celtic				
1967–68	Ossett Albion				
1968–69	Goole Town				
1969–70	Goole Town				
1970–71	Farsley Celtic				
1971–72	Yorkshire Amateur				
1972–73	Harrogate Town				
1973–74	Thackley				
1974–75	Thackley				
1975–76	Goole Town				
1976–77	Goole Town				
1977–78	Goole Town				
1978–79	Guiseley				
1979–80	Guiseley				
1989–81	Guiseley				
1981–82	Ossett Town				
1982–83	Guiseley	3–2	Farsley Celtic	Thackley Stadium	
1983–84	Farsley Celtic	1–0	Guiseley	Thackley Stadium	First matched ended 1–1.
1984–85	Goole Town	1–0	Harrogate Town	Wetherby Road	
1985–86	Harrogate Town	1–0	Goole Town	Victoria Pleasure Grounds	
1986–87	Goole Town	1–0	Harrogate Railway Athletic	Victoria Pleasure Grounds	
1987–88	Farsley Celtic	1–0	Pontefract Collieries	The Citadel	
1988–89	Goole Town	4–1	Guiseley	Nethermoor Park	
1989–90	Liversedge	3–2	Bradley Rangers		
1990–91	Bradford (Park Avenue)	5–1	Pontefract Collieries	Valley Parade	
1991–92	Goole Town	3–2	Bradley Rangers	Elland Road	
1992–93	Glasshoughton Welfare	4–0	Selby Town	Leeds Road	
1993–94	Goole Town	3–1	Armthorpe Welfare		
1994–95	Farsley Celtic	2–1	Thackley		
1995–96	Guiseley	3–1	Harrogate Railway Athletic		
1996–97	Farsley Celtic	3–0	Armthorpe Welfare	Fleet Lane	
1997–98	Garforth Town	2–0	Liversedge	Fleet Lane	
1998–99	Ossett Albion	2–0	Bradford (Park Avenue)	Fleet Lane	
1999–00	Garforth Town	2–0	Eccleshill United	Fleet Lane	
2000–01	Farsley Celtic	3–2	Ossett Town	Fleet Lane	After extra-time.
2001–02	Harrogate Town	4–0	Farsley Celtic	Fleet Lane	
2002–03	Harrogate Town	3–1	Farsley Celtic	Fleet Lane	
2003–04	Halifax Town	2–1	Farsley Celtic	Fleet Lane	
2004–05	Guiseley	1–0	Halifax Town	Fleet Lane	
2005–06	Farsley Celtic	2–1	Harrogate Town	Fleet Lane	
2006–07	Goole	3–1	Guiseley	Fleet Lane	
2007–08	Harrogate Town	6–0	Bradford (Park Avenue)	Fleet Lane	
2008–09	Garforth Town	1–1	Bradford (Park Avenue)	Fleet Lane	Garforth won 5–4 on penalties.
2009–10	Garforth Town	5–4	Barnoldswick Town	Fleet Lane	After extra-time.
2010–11	Guiseley	4–2	Thackley	Valley Parade	After extra-time.
2011–12	Guiseley	1–0	Bradford (Park Avenue)	Valley Parade	
2012–13	FC Halifax Town	1–0	Guiseley	Valley Parade	After extra-time.
2013–14	Eccleshill United	1–0	Harrogate Town	Valley Parade	
2014–15	Bradford (Park Avenue)	1–0	Garforth Town	Valley Parade	
2015–16	Bradford (Park Avenue)	3–2	Harrogate Town	Valley Parade	
2016–17	Farsley Celtic	1–1	Tadcaster Albion	Ings Lane	Farsley won 4–2 on penalties.
2017–18	Farsley Celtic	4–1	Selby Town	Fleet Lane	
2018–19	Ossett United	2–1	Guiseley	Ingfield	
2019–20	Competition abandoned due to COVID-19 pandemic.				
2020–21	Competition not held due to COVID-19 pandemic.				
2021–22	Liversedge	3–1	Brighouse Town	Dual Seal Stadium	
2022–23	Campion	2–1	Liversedge	Clayborn	
2023–24	Pontefract Collieries	4–1	Knaresborough Town	Ingfield	
2024–25	Route One Rovers	2–2	Golcar United	Fleet Lane	Route One Rovers won 4–3 on penalties.
2025–26	Tadcaster Albion	1–1	Route One Rovers	Fleet Lane	Tadcaster Albion won 5–4 on penalties.

=== Wins by teams ===
Club	Wins	First win	Last win	Notes
Goole Town	13	1950–51	1993–94	Dissolved in 1996.
Farsley Celtic	12	1957–58	2017–18	
Guiseley	8	1977–78	2011–12	
Harrogate Town	6	1962–63	2007–08	
Bradford (Park Avenue)	4	1929–30	2015–16	Won 1 title with reserves team.
Garforth Town	4	1997–98	2009–10	
Ossett Albion	4	1964–65	1998–99	
Yorkshire Amateur	3	1953–54	1960–61	
Hatfield Main	2	1961–62	1963–64	
Huddersfield Town reserves	2	1931–32	1933–34	
Liversedge	2	1989–90	2021–22	
Ossett Town	2	1958–59	1981–82	Dissolved in 2018. Merged with Ossett Albion to form Ossett United
Salts	2	1954–55	1955–56	
Thackley	2	1973–74	1974–75	
Bradford City reserves	1	1930–31	1930–31	
Bradford United Amateurs	1	1949–50	1949–50	Dissolved in 2007.
Campion	1	2022–23	2022–23	
Eccleshill United	1	2013–14	2013–14	
FC Halifax Town	1	2012–13	2012–13	
Glasshoughton Welfare	1	1992–93	1992–93	
Goole	1	2006–07	2006–07	
Halifax Town	1	2003–04	2003–04	
Leeds United reserves	1	1927–28	1927–28	
Ossett United	1	2018–19	2018–19	
Pontefract Collieries	1	2023–24	2023–24	
Route One Rovers	1	2024–25	2024–25	
Selby Town	1	1928–29	1928–29	
Swillington Miners Welfare	1	1952–53	1952–53	Dissolved in 2011.
Tadcaster Albion	1	2025–26	2025–26	

== Recent finals ==
=== 2013 Final ===
14 May 2013	FC Halifax Town	1 – 0 (a.e.t.)	Guiseley AFC	Valley Parade
19:45 BST	Gareth Seddon 105'

=== 2014 Final ===
9 April 2014	Harrogate Town	0 – 1	Eccleshill United	Valley Parade
19:45 BST		Report	Edwards 90' (pen.)

=== 2015 Final ===
15 April 2015	Bradford (Park Avenue)	1–0	Garforth Town	Valley Parade, Bradford
23:45 BST

=== 2016 Final ===
19 April 2016	Bradford (Park Avenue)	3–2	Harrogate Town	Valley Parade, Bradford
23:45 BST

=== 2017 Final ===
11 April 2017	Tadcaster Albion	1–1 (a.e.t.) (2–4 p)	Farsley Celtic	Ings Lane, Tadcaster
23:45 BST

=== 2018 Final ===
17 April 2018	Selby Town	1–4	Farsley Celtic	Fleet Lane, Leeds
23:45 BST	Tom Greaves 31'; Aidan Chippendale 60'		Will Thornton 89'	Attendance: 1,118; Referee: Garreth Rhodes

=== 2019 Final ===
9 April 2019	Ossett United	2–1	Guiseley AFC	Ingfield, Ossett
19:45 BST	Tom Greaves 31'; Aidan Chippendale 60'		Will Thornton 89'	Attendance: 1,118; Referee: Garreth Rhodes

=== 2022 Final ===
6 May 2022	Liversedge	3 – 1	Brighouse Town	Yorkshire Payments Stadium
19:45 BST	Ben Atkinson 20'; Nicky Walker 66'; Lewis Whitham 75'	Report	Laurence Sorhaindo 18'	Attendance: 1,087

=== 2023 Final ===
28 April 2023	Liversedge	1–2	Campion	Clayborn
19:45 BST	Jack Carr 50'		Patrick Sykes 66'; Aidan Day 70'	Attendance: 1,265

=== 2024 Final ===
6 May 2024	Knaresborough Town	0–4	Pontefract Collieries	Ingfield
19:45 BST			Adam Haw 16'; Jack Steers 45'; Bailey Thompson 69'; Michael Dunn 78'	Attendance: 885
