= Biggins =

Biggins is a surname of English origin. People with the name include:

- Bob Biggins (born 1946), American politician from Illinois
- Brian Biggins (1940–2006), English football player
- Christopher Biggins (born 1948), English actor and television personality
- Francis Joseph Biggins (1884–1962), English football player
- Jonathan Biggins (born 1960), Australian actor, singer, writer, and comedian
- Patrick Biggins, American politician
- Steve Biggins (born 1954), English football player and coach
- Wayne Biggins (born 1961), English football player
