= Wayne Benn =

English footballer, manager, and coach

Personal information
- Full name: Wayne Benn
- Date of birth: 7 August 1976 (age 50)
- Place of birth: Pontefract, England
- Height: 5 ft 9 in (1.75 m)
- Position: Midfielder

Youth career
- Bradford City

Senior career*
Years	Team	Apps	(Gls)
1994–1996	Bradford City	11	(0)
1996–2004	Bradford Park Avenue		
2004	→ Halifax Town (loan)		
2004	Frickley Athletic		
- Emley
- Ossett Town
- * Club domestic league appearances and goals

Wayne Benn (born 7 August 1976) is an English football manager/coach and a former professional footballer.

== Playing career ==
Benn began his career at Bradford City before he signed for local rivals Bradford Park Avenue in 1995, upon his release from City. He played in over 400 games for the club, as a sweeper or in central midfield. He briefly played on loan at Halifax Town before returning to Avenue in September 1996. He was player of the season in 1998–99. He left on a permanent basis in January 2004, signing for Frickley Athletic. In November 2004, he left for Emley before moving to Ossett Town in the Northern Premier League.

== Managerial career ==
Benn took over as manager of South Kirkby Colliery in July 2010. He had previously worked as the assistant manager at Guiseley and Bradford Park Avenue. He left South Kirkby Colliery at the end of the 2010–11 seasons and became the manager of Hemsworth Miners Welfare, of the Northern Counties East Football League. Benn left to become the manager at Goole in the Northern Premier League but later returned to manage Hemsworth.

In 2019, Benn was appointed Ossett United manager, but both the 2019–20 and 2020–21 seasons were terminated due to the COVID-19 pandemic. Playing in Division One East in 2021–22, Ossett United were in the top half of the table, but after only one win in three months, he was dismissed just before Christmas 2021.
