= 1994–95 Carlisle United F.C. season =

Carlisle United F.C.
1994–95 season
- Chairman: Michael Knighton
- Manager: Mick Wadsworth
- Stadium: Brunton Park
- Third Division: 1st (promoted)
- FA Cup: Third round
- League Cup: Second round
- Football League Trophy: Runners-up

For the 1994–95 season, Carlisle United F.C. competed in Football League Division Three.

== Results & fixtures ==
=== Football League Third Division ===
==== League table ====
Pos	Team	Pld	W	D	L	GF	GA	GD	Pts	Promotion or relegation
1	Carlisle United (C, P)	42	27	10	5	67	31	+36	91	Promotion to the Second Division
2	Walsall (P)	42	24	11	7	75	40	+35	83	Promotion to the Second Division
3	Chesterfield (O, P)	42	23	12	7	62	37	+25	81	Qualification for the Third Division play-offs
4	Bury	42	23	11	8	73	36	+37	80	Qualification for the Third Division play-offs
5	Preston North End	42	19	10	13	58	41	+17	67	Qualification for the Third Division play-offs

(C) Champions; (O) Play-off winners; (P) Promoted

==== Matches ====
Match Day	Date	Opponent	H/A	Score	Carlisle United Scorer(s)	Attendance
1	13 August	Wigan Athletic	H	2–1		
2	20 August	Torquay United	A	1–1		
3	27 August	Scarborough	H	2–0		
4	30 August	Walsall	A	2–1		
5	3 September	Scunthorpe United	A	3–2		
6	10 September	Exeter City	H	1–0		
7	13 September	Mansfield Town	H	2–1		
8	17 September	Wigan Athletic	A	2–0		
9	24 September	Northampton Town	A	1–2		
10	1 October	Darlington	H	2–1		
11	8 October	Lincoln City	A	1–1		
12	15 October	Colchester United	H	0–0		
13	22 October	Barnet	H	4–0		
14	29 October	Fulham	A	3–1		
15	5 November	Rochdale	H	4–1		
16	19 November	Hereford United	A	1–0		
17	26 November	Doncaster Rovers	H	1–1		
18	10 December	Torquay United	H	1–0		
19	17 December	Scarborough	A	2–1		
20	26 December	Hartlepool United	A	5–1		
21	27 December	Bury	H	3–0		
22	31 December	Gillingham	A	1–0		
23	14 January	Preston North End	H	0–0		
24	21 January	Rochdale	A	1–1		
25	24 January	Barnet	A	2–0		
26	28 January	Fulham	H	1–1		
27	4 February	Doncaster Rovers	A	0–0		
28	11 February	Hereford United	H	1–0		
29	18 February	Preston North End	A	0–1		
30	25 February	Darlington	A	2–0		
31	4 March	Northampton Town	H	2–1		
32	11 March	Exeter City	A	1–1		
33	18 March	Walsall	H	2–1		
34	25 March	Scunthorpe United	H	2–1		
35	1 April	Mansfield Town	A	2–1		
36	4 April	Chesterfield	H	1–1		
37	8 April	Gillingham	H	2–0		
38	15 April	Bury	A	0–2		
39	17 April	Hartlepool United	H	0–1		
40	29 April	Colchester United	A	1–0		
41	2 May	Chesterfield	A	2–1		
42	6 May	Lincoln City	H	1–3		

=== Football League Cup ===
Round	Date	Opponent	H/A	Score	Carlisle United Scorer(s)	Attendance
R1 L1	16 August	Rotherham United	A	0–1		
R1 L2	23 August	Rotherham United	H	3–1		
R2 L1	20 September	Queen's Park Rangers	H	0–1		
R2 L2	5 October	Queen's Park Rangers	A	0–2		

=== FA Cup ===
Round	Date	Opponent	H/A	Score	Carlisle United Scorer(s)	Attendance
R1	13 November	Guiseley	A	4–1		
R2	4 December	Darlington	H	2–0		
R3	7 January	Sunderland	A	1–1		
R3R	17 January	Sunderland	H	1–3		

=== Football League Trophy ===
Round	Date	Opponent	H/A	Score	Carlisle United Scorer(s)	Attendance
GS	27 September	Darlington	A	3–2		
GS	18 October	Hartlepool United	H	2–0		
R2	29 November	Chesterfield	H	1–0		
QF	10 January	Wrexham	H	2–1		
SF	14 February	Crewe Alexandra	A	1–0		
F L1 (North)	28 February	Rochdale	H	4–1		
F L2 (North)	14 March	Rochdale	A	1–2		
F	23 April	Birmingham City	A	0–1 (aet)		76,663
