= James Picken =

James Picken may refer to:

- James Picken (footballer), English footballer
- James Thomson Picken, better known as J. T. Picken, Scottish-Australian businessman

== See also ==
- James Pickens Jr. (born 1954), American actor
