= Albert Coleman =

English footballer

Personal information
- Full name: Albert Coleman
- Place of birth: England
- Position: Half back

Senior career*
Years	Team	Apps	(Gls)
- South Kirkby
- Frickley Colliery
1926–1929	Rotherham United	4	
1929–1931	Scarborough		
1931–?	Frickley Colliery		
- * Club domestic league appearances and goals

Albert Coleman was an English footballer who played as a half back for South Kirkby and Rotherham United.

== Playing career ==
Coleman began his football career with South Kirkby before moving to Frickley then Scarborough before joining Rotherham United, where he spent three seasons. In November 1931 he returned to Frickley from Rotherham.
