= Robert Stormont =

Scottish footballer

Bob Stormont
Personal information
- Full name: Robert Stormont
- Date of birth: 12 April 1872
- Place of birth: Dundee, Scotland
- Date of death: 5 March 1943 (aged 70)
- Place of death: Leven, Scotland
- Height: 5 ft 7 in (1.70 m)
- Positions: Half back; inside forward

Senior career*
Years	Team	Apps	(Gls)
1893	Johnstone Wanderers		
1893–1896	Preston North End	9	(0)
1896–1897	Dundee	8	(0)
1897–1901	Tottenham Hotspur	86	(8)
1901–1902	Brentford	22	(1)
–1909	Maidstone United		
- * Club domestic league appearances and goals

Robert Stormont (12 April 1872 – 5 March 1943) was a Scottish professional footballer who played as a half back or inside forward for a number of clubs in the English, Scottish and Southern leagues.

== Career ==
A half back or inside forward, Stormont transferred from Johnstone Wanderers to Football League First Division club Preston North End in 1893.He was 21 years at the time, he wore the jersey number 45 and made just 9 league appearances in three years at Deepdale and transferred to hometown Scottish First Division club Dundee in May 1896. He made just eight appearances during the 1896–97 season, before returning to England and finding a home with Southern League First Division club Tottenham Hotspur. Over the course of four seasons at White Hart Lane, Stormont made 232 appearances in all competitions and scored 24 goals. He was a member of the 1899–1900 Southern League First Division title-winning squad and he played in the first round of the club's victorious 1900–01 FA Cup campaign. Following the 1901–02 Southern League season, which he played with First Division club Brentford, Stormont became a referee. He later made a return to playing with Maidstone United, before retiring due to injury in 1909.

== Career statistics ==
Appearances and goals by club, season and competition
Club	Season	League			National cup (Note: Includes FA Cup, Scottish Cup)		Total	
Club	Season	Division	Apps	Goals	Apps	Goals	Apps	Goals
Preston North End	1893–94	First Division	9	0	0	0	9	0
Dundee	1896–97	Scottish League First Division	8	0	0	0	8	0
Tottenham Hotspur	1897–98	Southern League First Division	22	2	2	1	24	3
Tottenham Hotspur	1898–99	Southern League First Division	21	0	10	0	31	0
Tottenham Hotspur	1899–1900	Southern League First Division	22	1	1	0	23	1
Tottenham Hotspur	1900–01	Southern League First Division	21	5	1	0	22	5
Tottenham Hotspur	Total		86	8	14	1	100	9
Brentford	1901–02	Southern League First Division	22	1	3	0	25	1
Career total			119	9	17	1	136	10

== Honours ==
Tottenham Hotspur

- Southern League First Division: 1899–1900
