= Jock Malloch =

British footballer

Personal information
- Full name: John Napier Malloch
- Date of birth: 3 November 1877
- Place of birth: Dundee, Scotland
- Date of death: 26 December 1935 (aged 58)
- Place of death: Moorthorpe, England
- Position: Outside left

Senior career*
Years	Team	Apps	(Gls)
- East Craigie
1896–1899	Dundee	12	(2)
1899–1900	Brighton United		
1900–1908	The Wednesday	144	(12)
1908–1909	Barnsley		
1909–1912	South Kirkby		
- * Club domestic league appearances and goals

John Napier Malloch (2 November 1877 – 26 December 1935) was an English footballer who played as an outside left for Dundee, The Wednesday, Barnsley and South Kirkby.

== Playing career ==
Malloch left Dundee for Sheffield Wednesday in 1900 for a fee of £50. In April 1900 Malloch and fellow Dundee player John Low had been playing together in England and joined The Wednesday (Sheffield) on trial, with their prospective club, Brighton United in financial difficulties. Malloch officially joined Sheffield Wednesday in May. Whilst at the club he won the Football League in the 1902–03 and 1903–04 seasons and was still in the squad in the 1906–07 season when the Owls won the FA Cup, though he did not play in the competition that season.

In September 1907 Wednesday were given permission to give Malloch a benefit match. Following this Malloch found himself confined to the reserves, and on New Year's Eve 1908 he transferred to local rivals Barnsley. His time at Barnsley began with a series of poor performances and by September he had moved on to South Kirkby.

At South Kirkby, Malloch once again found form and was instrumental in helping the club to the semi-final of the Sheffield Challenge Cup and the final of the Wharncliffe Charity Cup in the 1911–12 season. The final of the Wharncliffe Cup saw Malloch return to familiar territory at Owlerton Stadium, where South Kirkby met his old rivals Sheffield United. He also was a pivotal player in the club's run in the FA Cup that season.

== See also ==
- List of Sheffield Wednesday F.C. players
