= W. Edmund Livingstone =

English footballer

Personal information
- Place of birth: England
- Position: Full back

Senior career*
Years	Team	Apps	(Gls)
?–1910	South Kirkby		
1910–?	Sheffield United		
- * Club domestic league appearances and goals

W. Edmund Livingstone was an English footballer who played as a full back for South Kirkby and Sheffield United.

== Playing career ==
Livingstone began his football career with South Kirkby before joining Sheffield United in August 1910 after a successful trial. In signing Livingstone, Sheffield United beat off interest from many clubs, most notably from Huddersfield Town.
