= Robert Caldwell (footballer) =

English footballer

Personal information
- Full name: Robert Caldwell
- Date of birth: July 1909
- Place of birth: Hemsworth, England
- Height: 5 ft 9 in (1.75 m)
- Position: Inside right

Senior career*
Years	Team	Apps	(Gls)
?–1933	South Kirkby		
1933–1936	Doncaster Rovers		
1936–?	Bristol City		
- * Club domestic league appearances and goals

Robert Caldwell was an English footballer who played as a centre forward for South Kirkby, Doncaster Rovers and Bristol City.

== Playing career ==
Caldwell began his football career at South Kirkby in the Sheffield Association before moving to Doncaster Rovers in August 1933. In May 1936 he moved to Bristol City.
