= William Capstick =

English footballer

Personal information
- Full name: William Capstick
- Place of birth: England
- Position: Goalkeeper

Senior career*
Years	Team	Apps	(Gls)
1924–1928	South Kirkby		
1928–?	Frickley Colliery		
?–1931	South Kirkby		
1931–?	Frickley Colliery		
1932–1932	Barnsley		
1932–1933	Mexborough Athletic		
1933–1933	Sheffield Wednesday		
1933–?	South Kirkby		
- * Club domestic league appearances and goals

William Capstick was an English footballer who played as a goalkeeper for South Kirkby, Sheffield Wednesday and Barnsley

== Playing career ==
Capstick began his football career with South Kirkby, where he spent three seasons before joining Frickley Colliery in November 1928. He returned to South Kirkby for a short period where he was given a trial by an unnamed Cheshire League club, before yet again switching to Frickley in March 1931. In 1932 Capstick was signed by Barnsley, but moved to Mexborough Athletic in the same season. Next Capstick was plucked from Mexborough by Sheffield Wednesday but his time at the club was short, he returned to South Kirkby in February 1933.
