= Walter Coulston =

English footballer

Personal information
- Full name: Walter Coulston
- Date of birth: 31 January 1912
- Place of birth: Wombwell, Yorkshire, England
- Date of death: June 1990 (age 88)
- Place of death: Barnsley, Yorkshire
- Position: Winger

Senior career*
Years	Team	Apps	(Gls)
?–1932	South Kirkby		
1933–1936	Manchester City		
1936–1937	Crystal Palace	12	(1)
1937–1938	Exeter City		
1938–1939	Barnsley		
1939–?	Notts County		
- * Club domestic league appearances and goals

Walter Coulston (31 January 1912 – June 1990) was an English footballer who played as an outside right for South Kirkby, Manchester City, Crystal Palace, Exeter City, Barnlsey and Notts County.

== Playing career ==
Coulston began his football career with South Kirkby before joining Crystal Palace in 1936 where he went on to make 12 appearances for the club, scoring one goal. In July 1937 he left Crystal Palace for Exeter City. and in June 1938 he returned north to Barnsley. In March 1939 Bradford City sent their manager, David Steele, to assess Coulston but in May 1939 he joined Notts County.
