= Frank McAvoy =

Scottish footballer

Personal information
- Full name: Francis McAvoy
- Date of birth: 16 November 1875
- Place of birth: Ayr, Scotland
- Positions: Left half; outside left

Senior career*
Years	Team	Apps	(Gls)
- Ayr
1895–1898	Woolwich Arsenal	44	(8)
1898–1900	Brighton United		
1900–1901	Gravesend United		
1901–1902	Brighton & Hove Albion	11	(6)
1902–1903	Watford	23	(2)
1903–1904	Ayr	10	(4)
- * Club domestic league appearances and goals

Francis McAvoy (born 16 November 1875 in Ayr, deceased) was a Scottish professional footballer who made 44 appearances in the Football League for Woolwich Arsenal. He also played for Scottish Football League club Ayr at the start and end of his career, and for Southern League clubs Brighton United, Gravesend United, Brighton & Hove Albion and Watford. He played as a left half or outside left. McAvoy played 69 games in all competitions, scoring once, for Brighton United, and was Brighton & Hove Albion's captain and top scorer in the club's first season, 1901–02, with nine goals in all competitions. At Watford he played 24 competitive matches, scoring twice.

== Controversy ==
In December 1901 McAvoy had a confrontation with Brighton & Hove Albion's manager, John Jackson which didn't calm down. This culminated in McAvoy assaulting Jackson and knocking him to the ground the following February. McAvoy was sacked from the club as a result. In August, McAvoy, along with fellow former player, Clem Barker, went to the Farm Tavern (which Jackson ran) looking for him. He was away and the pair told his wife; "We are going to the station to meet your husband, and you must consider yourself lucky if he is brought home alive!". They were found guilty of threatening behaviour and bound to keep the peace for 6 months.
