= Christopher Crapper =

English footballer

Personal information
- Full name: Christopher Crapper
- Date of birth: 5 July 1884
- Place of birth: Rotherham, England
- Date of death: 1933 (aged 48–49)
- Height: 5 ft 10 in (1.78 m)
- Position: Full-back

Senior career*
Years	Team	Apps	(Gls)
1904–1905	South Kirkby		
1905–1907	The Wednesday	1	(0)
1907–1908	Grimsby Town	3	(0)
1908–19??	South Kirkby		
- * Club domestic league appearances and goals

Christopher Crapper (5 July 1884 – 1933) was an English professional footballer who played as a full-back. He played in the Football League for The Wednesday and Grimsby Town. After football he became a prominent member of South Kirkby Parish Council, Hemsworth Rural Council and died in South Elmsall in June 1933.

== Playing career ==
Crapper began his career at South Kirkby, joining Sheffield Wednesday in May 1905. In July 1907 he left the Owls, signing for Grimsby Town. His career at Grimsby was halted by a broken leg and he returned to his first club South Kirkby.
