= Frederick Martin (footballer) =

English footballer

Fred Martin
Personal information
- Full name: Frederick Martin
- Place of birth: England
- Date of death: January 1932
- Place of death: Derby
- Position: Inside right

Senior career*
Years	Team	Apps	(Gls)
?–1909	South Kirkby		
1909–1912	Barnsley		
1912–1913	Sunderland		
1913–?	Raith Rovers		
- * Club domestic league appearances and goals

Frederick Martin (died 1932) was an English footballer who played as an inside right for South Kirkby, Barnsley, Sunderland, and Raith Rovers

== Playing career ==
Martin began his football career with South Kirkby before being signed by Barnsley in May 1909. He played at either inside right or centre forward for Barnsley. After three seasons at Oakwell, he next moved to Sunderland in February 1913 and then to Raith Rovers. By April, Martin found himself in the final of the Scottish Cup with Raith but ended up on the losing side. In 1914, Martin scored two goals for Raith Rovers in a Scottish Cup win over the then mighty Hearts, where he broke a tooth in doing so. His exploits for Raith led to him being heavily linked to a return to Sunderland or a transfer to Hearts or Celtic.

Martin died in January 1932 at the age of 43.
