= Frank Wildman =

English footballer

Personal information
- Full name: Frank Reginald Wildman
- Date of birth: 11 June 1908
- Place of birth: South Kirkby, Yorkshire
- Date of death: 1994 (aged 85–86)
- Height: 5 ft 11 1/2 in (1.82 m)
- Position: Goalkeeper

Senior career*
Years	Team	Apps	(Gls)
?–1932	South Kirkby		
1932–1935	Wolverhampton Wanderers	54	(0)
1935–1936	Reading	14	(0)
1936–1945	Swindon Town	94	(0)
- Frickley Colliery
- * Club domestic league appearances and goals

Frank Reginald Wildman (11 June 1908 – 1994) was an English footballer who played as a goalkeeper for South Kirkby, Wolverhampton Wanderers, Reading and Swindon Town.

== Playing career ==
Wildman began his football career at South Kirkby in the Sheffield Association League, before moving to Wolves in November 1932. Wildman secured a first team position at Wolves until the arrival of Utterson and in February 1935 he transferred to Reading. He was the second South Kirkby player within a year to join Wolves, the first being teammate and future England international Tom Smalley.

== Other sport ==
Wildman was also a prominent member of the South Kirkby Colliery Cricket Club.
