= George Fergusson =

George Fergusson may refer to:

- George Fergusson (diplomat) (born 1955), British diplomat
- George Fergusson, Lord Hermand (1743–1827), Scottish judge

== See also ==
- George Ferguson (disambiguation)
