= Willie Layton =

English footballer

Personal information
- Full name: William Layton
- Date of birth: 1875
- Place of birth: Gornal, Staffordshire
- Date of death: 1944 (aged 68–69)
- Position: Full back

Senior career*
Years	Team	Apps	(Gls)
- Blackwell Colliery
- Chesterfield Town
1898–1909	The Wednesday	331	(4)
- Whitwell St Lawrence
- * Club domestic league appearances and goals

William Layton (1875–1944) was an English footballer who played as a full back in the late 1890s and early 1900s. Born in Gornal, Staffordshire, he played for Blackwell Colliery and Chesterfield Town before joining The Wednesday (later known as Sheffield Wednesday) during the 1897–98 season. In almost 12 years with The Wednesday, Layton made more than 300 appearances in The Football League and was part of the team that won the First Division title in 1902–03 and 1903–04. He was also in the team that won the FA Cup in 1906–07 and was once selected to play in a Football League XI. He made his final appearance for the club early in the 1909–10 season and later left to join Whitwell St Lawrence.

== Family ==
William was the brother of footballer Edward Arthur Layton, who played for Sheffield United, Aston Villa and Middlesbrough. In 1912 the brothers left England to travel across Australia, where they played for a number of clubs. Whilst there Edward was 'capped' in a match between New South Wales and Queensland. Edward returned to England after 8 years but Willie stayed, after remarrying bigamously in 1914 and brought up a second family. He never played football again, and never allowed his sons in Australia to play or even mention the game. Willie died in 1944 and is buried in Lithgow, New South Wales. On the English family side, William is the great grandfather to Michael Knighton (Michael's mother, Barbara Layton, was William's granddaughter.) Michael Knighton was on the books of Coventry City as a 15/16 year old but was seriously injured after just one season with Coventry so returned to finish his education. Michael Knighton became one of football's best known football directors via his involvement with Manchester United (1989-92) and as owner and CEO of Carlisle United (1992-2002).

== Honours ==
=== Club ===
The Wednesday

- Football League First Division: 1902–03, 1903–04
- Football League Second Division: 1899–1900
- FA Cup: 1906–07
