= John Willie Sutcliffe =

English soccer, rugby union & league player

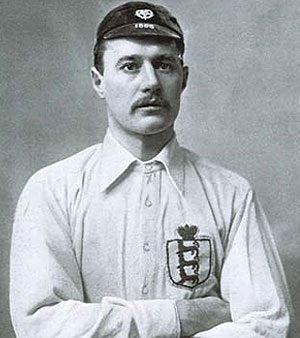
- Sutcliffe in 1895 with England
- Born: John William Sutcliffe; 14 April 1868; Shibden, Yorkshire, England
- Died: 7 July 1947 (aged 79); Bradford, Yorkshire, England

Rugby union career
- Position(s): Fullback, Centre
Senior career
Years	Team	Apps	(Points)
1886	Bradford		
≤1889	Heckmondwike		
International career
Years	Team	Apps	(Points)
1889	England	1	(3)
Association football career
- Height: 6 ft 0 in (1.83 m)
- Position: Goalkeeper
Senior career*
Years	Team	Apps	(Gls)
1889–1902	Bolton Wanderers	332	(0)
1902–1903	Millwall Athletic		
1903–1905	Manchester United	21	(0)
1905–1912	Plymouth Argyle	214	(0)
1912–1913	Southend United		
1913–1914	South Kirkby		
Total		567+	(0)
International career
	Football League	5	(0)
1893–1903	England	5	(0)
Managerial career
- 1914–1915: Vitesse Arnhem
- * Club domestic league appearances and goals

John William Sutcliffe (14 April 1868 – 7 July 1947), commonly known as John Willie Sutcliffe and J.W. Sutcliffe, was an English football and rugby union player. He was the last person to represent England at full international level in both sports.

== Life and career ==
Born in Shibden, he started his career in 1886 at Bradford Rugby Club playing at either full back or centre three quarter before moving to the club from Heckmondwike where he gained his only cap for England against the New Zealand Natives in 1889, scoring one try, and one conversion for five points.

Heckmondwike was suspended by the Rugby Football Union over allegations of professionalism and he switched codes to play football for Bolton Wanderers, finally playing in the first team as a goalkeeper. Here he gained his first of five England caps against Wales in a 6–0 win in 1893. 1894 saw him on the losing side in the FA Cup final.

1902 saw Sutcliffe at Southern League Millwall Athletic before moving on in 1903 to Manchester United where he played 28 games. He joined Plymouth Argyle in January 1905 and by the end of the season had become the club's first choice goalkeeper. The Argyle handbook for the 1905–06 season describes Sutcliffe as "a marvel for his years." In more than seven years with the club, he made 214 appearances in league competition and four in the FA Cup. He left the club at the end of the 1911–12 campaign and became a player-coach at Southend United. His last known club was South Kirkby Colliery, who he joined in 1913.

Sutcliffe was appointed manager of Dutch club Vitesse Arnhem in 1914. He returned to England after the First World War to work for Bradford City as a coach. Sutcliffe died on 7 July 1947 at the age of 79 in Bradford.

Sporting positions
Preceded by Harry Stafford	Manchester United captain 1903–1904	Succeeded by Jack Peddie
