= John Low (footballer) =

Scottish footballer

Personal information
- Full name: John Hamilton Low
- Date of birth: 29 October 1874
- Place of birth: Dundee, Scotland
- Position: Wing half

Senior career*
Years	Team	Apps	(Gls)
1895–1899	Dundee	2	(0)
1899–1900	Brighton United		
1900–1901	Bolton Wanderers	1	(0)
Total		3	(0)
- * Club domestic league appearances and goals

John Hamilton Low (29 October 1874 – ?) was a Scottish footballer who played in the Football League for Bolton Wanderers. He had moved south from Scottish club Dundee with teammate Jock Malloch, but their first club Brighton United had financial difficulties and the two men went their separate ways.

John Low
Personal information
- Full name: John Hamilton Low
- Date of birth: 29 October 1874
- Place of birth: Dundee, Scotland
- Position: Wing half

Senior career*
Years	Team	Apps	(Gls)
1895–1899	Dundee	2	(0)
1899–1900	Brighton United		
1900–1901	Bolton Wanderers	1	(0)
Total		3	(0)
- * Club domestic league appearances and goals

John Hamilton Low (29 October 1874 – ?) was a Scottish footballer who played as a wing half in the English Football League for Bolton Wanderers.

== Career ==
Low began his career in his native Scotland with Dundee, making two appearances over four seasons. In 1899, he moved to England alongside teammate Jock Malloch to join Brighton United of the Southern Football League. However, the club soon suffered from severe financial difficulties and folded in 1900.

Following the collapse of Brighton United, Low joined Bolton Wanderers. He made one appearance in the English Football League First Division during the 1900–01 season before leaving the club.
