= Jock Caldwell =

Scottish footballer

Personal information
- Full name: John Caldwell
- Date of birth: 28 November 1874
- Place of birth: Shawwood, Ayrshire, Scotland
- Height: 5 ft 9 in (1.75 m)
- Position: Left back

Senior career*
Years	Team	Apps	(Gls)
1892–1893	Newmilns		
1893–1894	Hibernian		
1894–1896	Woolwich Arsenal	59	(1)
1896	Third Lanark	15	(0)
1896–1898	Woolwich Arsenal	34	(1)
1898–1899	Brighton United		
1899–1901	Galston		
1901–1905	Brighton & Hove Albion	37	(10)
- * Club domestic league appearances and goals

John Caldwell (28 November 1874 – after 1904) was a Scottish professional footballer who played as a left back in the English Football League for Woolwich Arsenal and in the Scottish League for Third Lanark.

== Life and career ==
Caldwell was born in Shawwood, Ayrshire. He was on the books of Hibernian before going south to join Woolwich Arsenal of the English Second Division in 1894. On the evidence of practice matches, the Kentish Mercury wrote that Caldwell appeared to be just the left back Arsenal needed: "a safe tackler, can keep the forwards off his goalkeeper, has a good pace, and is very clever at overhead kicking." He must have justified the opinion, because he was ever-present through the 1894–95 season and missed only one match in the next, in partnership with regular right-back Joe Powell. At the end of the season, he returned to Scotland and joined Third Lanark. He was reported to have been willing to stay, but his wife-to-be was reluctant to move south.

Caldwell continued his good form with Third Lanark. He was selected for the Glasgow Association team to face Sheffield, and was touted for full international honours. At the end of November 1896, Joe Powell died of blood poisoning and tetanus after breaking his arm during a match. Caldwell was reportedly anxious to return to his former club, and within weeks, he was back. He played in most matches of what remained of the season and the start of the next, but Alex McConnell also came into consideration at left back. Caldwell was suspended sine die in the second half of the season, but reinstated on reduced wages around the time that manager Thomas Mitchell resigned, and he finished the campaign playing at right back.

He began the 1898–99 season with the newly formed Brighton United of the Southern League, and played 45 of a possible 49 competitive matches, but then returned to Scotland with junior club Galston. In 1901, when a new professional club was founded in Brighton, Caldwell returned to English football with Brighton & Hove Albion. He was a regular in the side for three seasons, and captained the team as they gained promotion to the Southern League First Division in 1902–03, but played only reserve-team football in 1904–05, after which he left the club.
