= Ossett United F.C. =

English football club

Coordinates: 53°40′53.51″N 1°34′39.13″W

Ossett United
- Full name: Ossett United Football Club
- Nickname: The Sheepicorns
- Founded: 2018; 8 years ago
- Ground: Ingfield, Ossett
- Capacity: 3,280
- Chairman: Phil Smith
- Manager: James Walshaw
- League: Northern Premier League Division One East
- 2025–26: Northern Premier League Division One East, 18th of 22
- Website: https://www.ossettutd.com/
Home colours	Away colours

Ossett United Football Club is a football club based in Ossett, West Yorkshire, England. They are currently members of the Northern Premier League Division One East.

== History ==
Ossett United was created on 1 June 2018 following the merger of Ossett Town A.F.C. (est. 1936) and Ossett Albion A.F.C. (est. 1944). Both predecessors had managed to gain and retain Northern Premier League status for long periods. The new club made its new home at Ingfield, the previous home of Ossett Town, and used Dimple Wells, the previous home of Ossett Albion, as its ladies and academy team base.

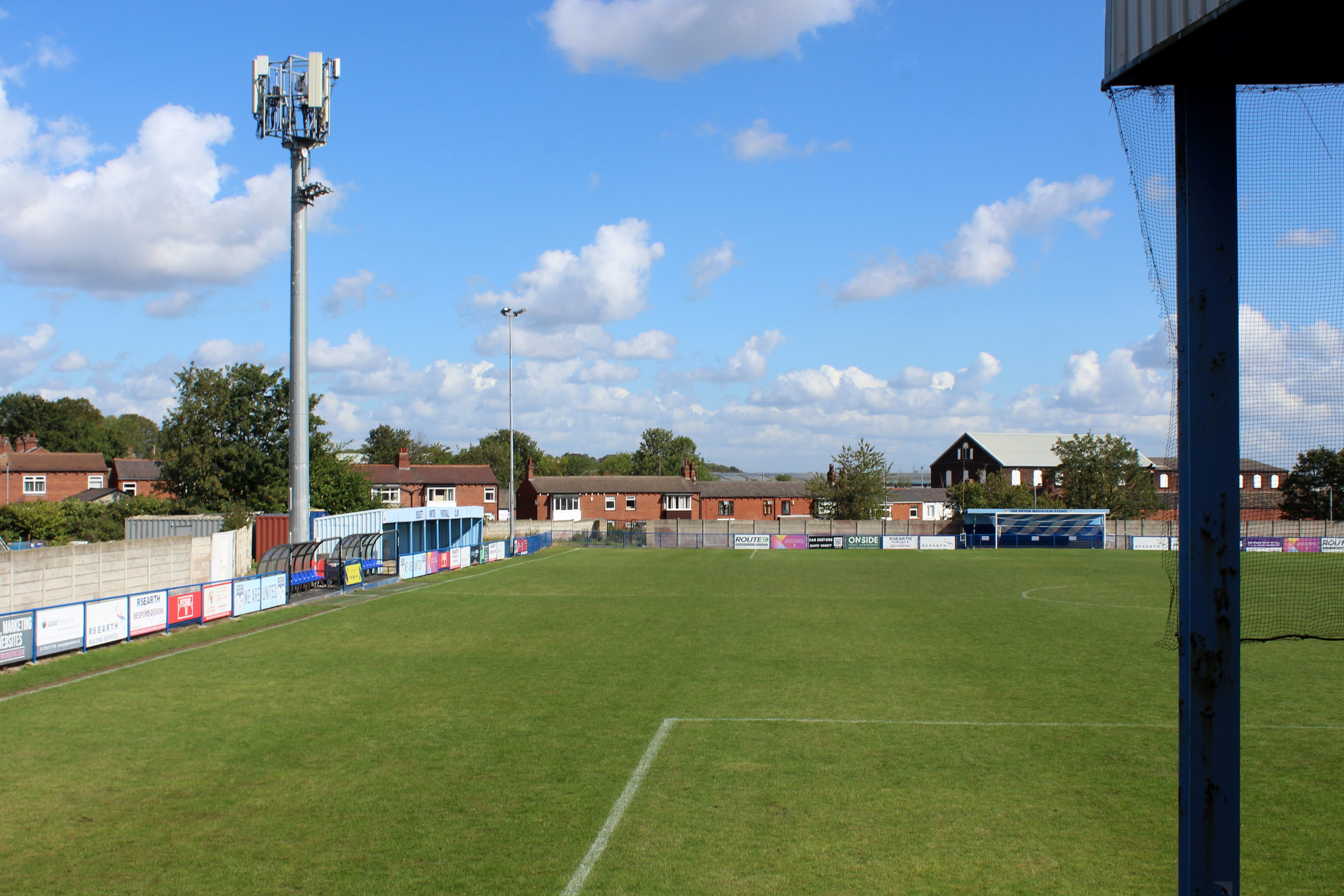
Ingfield

Despite a successful first season on the pitch (reaching the play-off semi-final and winning the County Cup, under manager Andy Welsh), the club suffered several board resignations and some challenging financial issues. By the end of the 2018–19 season, Phil Smith had become club chairman with Stuart Garside, Steve Hanks, Paul Billing, Neil Spofforth and Joe Hanks joining the board.

Welsh left Ossett early the following season. In November 2019, the club lost a court case, relating to a match in 2015 when Ossett Town played Radcliffe Borough, leaving United facing legal and damages costs of £135,000. A loan from two supporters helped the club avoid going into liquidation (at worst) or selling the Ingfield ground (at best). The 2019–20 and 2020–21 seasons were terminated due to the COVID-19 pandemic.

In 2020, James Rogers became chairman, a role he had previously held at Ossett Town. Also in 2020, the club declared Dimple Wells surplus to requirements and made arrangements to surrender the lease making Ingfield the single home of the united club. Various ground improvements at Ingfield followed, including replacement of the pitch-side barrier and installation of LED floodlights in 2021, and changing room improvements in 2023 supported by Football Foundation grants. The improvements added a match official room, two offices and a medical room (a larger changing room will become fully operational by the summer of 2024).

Wayne Benn, assisted by Chick Hayward, had succeeded Welsh as Ossett United manager. Playing in Division One East in 2021–22, Ossett United were in the top half of the table, but a run of only one win in three months saw a change in the dugout before Christmas 2021, with Jas Colliver and Mark Ward taking a joint managerial role. The season ended well with the pair unbeaten at Ingfield with seven wins and two draws but away from home inconsistent performances and results saw a ninth-place finish in only the club's second completed season.

Colliver and Ward strengthened the squad before the 2022–23 season but results did not match expectations. Ward resigned in September 2022 with Colliver taking sole charge before leaving the club by mutual consent the following month. Grant Black became the club's fourth permanent manager in October 2022, winning his first game in charge, 2–0 at the eventual play-off champions Long Eaton United and only tasting defeat twice in his first 16 games. Results tailed off, however, and the club finished 15th.

In summer 2023, the boardroom was strengthened by the appointments of Dawn Rogers and Kate Hennighan. After a 4–1 defeat to Sheffield FC, Black was sacked on Christmas Eve 2023. For the remainder of the 23/24 season assistant manager David Brown stepped in as interim manager seeing an upturn in performances on the pitch and in his 20 league games at the helm the side claimed 19 points including five wins to avoid relegation with a game to spare, and ending the season in 16th place.

On 9 May 2024, Ossett United appointed 36-year-old Dave Wild as new manager for the 2024–25 season, but the former Mossley and Runcorn Linnets manager left the club in October 2024 with the side at the foot of the table. James Walshaw was appointed manager on 27 October 2024. Following a significant turnaround in results including six wins in 11 games, Walshaw was given a contract until the end of the 2025/26 season.

== Honours ==
- West Riding County Cup: Winners, 2018-19

== Current squad ==
As of 21 August 2026

Note: Flags indicate national team as defined under FIFA eligibility rules; some limited exceptions apply. Players may hold more than one non-FIFA nationality.

No.	Pos.	Nation	Player
—	GK	ENG	Aleks Petrovic
—	DF	FRA	Ferdinand Annor
—	DF	ENG	Josh Burns
—	DF	ENG	Ty Duane
—	DF	ENG	Tom Jamieson
—	DF	ENG	Conor Qualter (vice-captain)
—	DF	ENG	Will Thompson
—	DF	WAL	Ethen Vaughan
—	DF	ENG	Tyrell Dawes
—	MF	ENG	Josh Askew (captain)

No.	Pos.	Nation	Player
—	MF	ENG	Jack Crook
—	MF	ENG	Jacob Johnson
—	MF	ENG	Jean-Claude Makiessi
—	MF	ENG	Fionn Murphy
—	MF	ENG	Joe Poxon
—	MF	ENG	Mohamed Wassa
—	FW	ENG	Youssef Chentouf
—	FW	ENG	Joe Crosby
—	FW	ENG	Jaanai Gordon
—	FW	ENG	Devonte Morton

== Club officials ==
Position	Staff
Manager	James Walshaw
Assistant Manager	Luke Potter
Goalkeeper Coach	Matt Brooke
Performance Analyst	Vacancy
Sports Therapist	Vacancy
Chairman	Phil Smith
Finance Director	Joe Hanks

== Records ==
- Best League Position: 5th in Northern Premier League Division One East, 2018-19
- Best FA Cup Performance: Second qualifying round, 2019-20, 2026-27
- Best FA Trophy Performance: First round, 2024–25
- Record League Attendance: 1005 vs Liversedge, 15 October 2021
- Record Cup Attendance: 1,118 vs AFC Guiseley, West Riding County Cup Final, 9 April 2019
