= Patrick Farrell (footballer) =

Irish footballer

Pat Farrell
Personal information
- Full name: Patrick Farrell
- Date of birth: 3 April 1872
- Place of birth: Ligoniel, Ireland
- Date of death: 1950 (aged 77–78)
- Place of death: Hove, England
- Height: 5 ft 9 in (1.75 m)
- Position: Right half

Senior career*
Years	Team	Apps	(Gls)
189?–1894	Ligoniel		
1894–1895	Belfast Celtic		
1895–1896	Distillery		
1896–1897	Celtic	0	(0)
1897–1898	Woolwich Arsenal	19	(2)
1898–1900	Brighton United		
1900–1901	Distillery		
1901–1904	Brighton & Hove Albion	27	(0)

International career
1901	Ireland	2	(0)
- * Club domestic league appearances and goals

Patrick Farrell (3 April 1872 – 1950) was an Ireland international footballer. He played as a right half in the Football League for Woolwich Arsenal, in the Irish League for Ligoniel, Belfast Celtic and Distillery, in the Scottish Cup for Celtic, and in the English Southern League for Brighton United and Brighton & Hove Albion. He won two Irish League titles with Distillery, in 1895–96 and 1900–01.
