= Edward Layton (footballer) =

English footballer

Personal information
- Full name: Edward Arthur Layton
- Date of birth: q1 1883
- Place of birth: Gornal, West Midlands, England
- Date of death: 1955 (aged 71–72)
- Position: Full back

Youth career
- Royston United

Senior career*
Years	Team	Apps	(Gls)
?–1904	Sheffield United		
- South Kirkby
?–1908	Rotherham Town		
1908–?	Aston Villa		
?–1912	Middlesbrough		
1914–?	Cardiff City		
- Stockport County
- * Club domestic league appearances and goals

Edward Layton was an English footballer who played as a left and right full back for Sheffield United, South Kirkby, Aston Villa, Middlesbrough and Cardiff City.

== Playing career ==
Layton began his football career at Royston United in the Barnsley Junior and Sheffield Association leagues, before moving to Sheffield United, where he helped the reserves to the Midland League title. Injury in the 1903/04 season meant he missed much of the season and he eventually left to join South Kirkby, where he became club captain. He later moved to Rotherham Town before being signed by Aston Villa in January 1908, moving next to Middlesbrough. In 1912 he left Middlesbrough for Australia, along with his brother William. In 1914 he returned to England, where he had been playing football for two years, with Middlesbrough still holding his registration. Cardiff City eventually acquired his registration and later he joined Stockport County.

== International career ==
Between 1912 and 1914 Layton travelled across Australia, playing football for various small clubs. During this time he was 'capped' by Australia in a match between New South Wales and Queensland. Even though his normal position was full back he played the game as centre forward, scoring the only goal.

== Family ==
Edward was the brother of William Layton, a footballer with Sheffield Wednesday.
