= Jack Hillman =

English footballer

Personal information
- Full name: John William Hillman
- Date of birth: 30 October 1871
- Place of birth: Tavistock, England
- Date of death: 16 December 1952 (aged 81)
- Position: Goalkeeper

Senior career*
Years	Team	Apps	(Gls)
1890–1895	Burnley	100	(0)
1895–1896	Everton	35	(0)
1896–1898	Dundee	36	(0)
1898–1902	Burnley	75	(0)
1902–1906	Manchester City	116	(0)
1907–1908	Millwall		

International career
1899	England	1	(0)
- * Club domestic league appearances and goals

John William John Hillman (30 October 1871 – 16 December 1952) was an English football goalkeeper who played for Burnley, Everton, Dundee, Manchester City and Millwall.

== Career ==
Jack Hillman was born in Tavistock, Devon, but it was in Lancashire that he made his reputation. In 1890 Hillman was playing for the Young Pilgrims, a junior side affiliated with Plymouth Argyle. An impressive performance against Burnley reserves prompted the Football League club to sign him, and he made his first team debut in 1891. He played for the club for the majority of the next decade, aside from two years at Everton, and a brief spell at Dundee.

Hillman was known throughout his career as "Happy Jack" and spent four years at Turf Moor before being sold to Everton for £150 in February 1895. He was unable to settle at Goodison Park and in June 1896 he moved on to Dundee. His time at Dundee was not a great success, and midway through the 1897–98 season he was suspended by the club for "not trying", although at the time the club was bankrupt and unable to pay Hillman's wages. He returned to Burnley in March 1898.

On 18 February 1899, Hillman made his only international appearance against Ireland. The match was played at Roker Park, Sunderland's new ground and ended in a 13–2 victory for England, with four goals from Gilbert Smith and three from Jimmy Settle. The scoreline in this match is the record number of goals scored by England in a single match, and also the highest aggregate goals (15) in a game involving England.

In the 1899–1900 season Burnley were struggling to avoid relegation from the First Division. Going into their final match of the season, against Nottingham Forest, Burnley needed to win to stand a chance of survival. Hillman attempted to bribe the Forest players, offering them £2 each to "take it easy". At half-time he increased his offer to £5, but Burnley lost 4–0 and were relegated. After the game, the Forest secretary wrote to the F.A. to complain about Hillman's activities. Hillman was summoned to a joint F.A.-Football League commission in Manchester. Hillman's defence was that the whole thing had been a joke, apparently inspired by suspicions around Forest's 8–0 defeat against West Bromwich Albion a few weeks previously. Hillman claimed that he was only asking for a similar favour. The Football Association were not convinced by Hillman's explanation and banned him for a season for his actions. The incident is the earliest recorded case of match fixing in the sport. Once his ban had expired, he returned to the Burnley team.

In January 1902 Hillman was transferred to Manchester City. He made his Manchester City debut on 1 February 1902 in a First Division match against Notts County at Hyde Road. He subsequently played in all 13 remaining league fixtures that season, but was unable to prevent City being relegated at the end of the season. City only spent one season in the Second Division and were promoted as champions in 1903, going on to take second place in the First Division in 1904. Hillman was also part of the Manchester City team which won the FA Cup in 1904, the club's first major trophy, remaining as first choice keeper until 1906.

During the 1905–06 season he was supplanted as first choice goalkeeper by John Edmondson. In the 1906 close season the Football Association investigated Manchester City's accounts for bonuses, which though commonplace among leading football clubs, were not permitted under FA rules. The FA chose to make an example of City, and Hillman was one of seventeen players suspended until 1 January 1907, and banned from representing the club again. Hillman was also fined £50. The ban on playing for Manchester City was rescinded in 1908, but Hillman never played for the club again.

He joined Millwall Athletic in January 1907, although his playing career soon came to an end with an elbow injury.

When he retired as a footballer he returned to live in Burnley and became a confectioner although, after the First World War, he returned to Turf Moor as a trainer for a year. Hillman died at home on 16 December 1952, and was buried at Burnley Cemetery.

== Honours ==
Manchester City

- FA Cup winner: 1904
- Football League Division Two champions: 1902–03
- Football League Division One runners-up: 1903–04
