= Barney Battles Sr. =

Scottish footballer

Barney Battles
Personal information
- Full name: Bernard Battles
- Date of birth: 13 January 1875
- Place of birth: Springburn, Scotland
- Date of death: 9 February 1905 (aged 30)
- Place of death: Glasgow, Scotland
- Height: 5 ft 11 in (1.80 m)
- Positions: Full-back; wing half

Youth career
- Linlithgow Juniors
- Broxburn

Senior career*
Years	Team	Apps	(Gls)
1893–1894	Bathgate		
1894–1895	Heart of Midlothian	16	(0)
1895–1897	Celtic	28	(3)
1896	→ Liverpool (loan)	2	(0)
1897–1898	Dundee	15	(2)
1898	→ Liverpool (loan)	1	(0)
1898–1904	Celtic	81	(3)
1904–1905	Kilmarnock	23	(0)

International career
1899–1902	Scottish League XI	2	(0)
1901	Scotland	3	(0)
- * Club domestic league appearances and goals

Bernard Battles (13 January 1875 – 9 February 1905) was a Scottish footballer, whose clubs included Heart of Midlothian, Celtic, Liverpool, Dundee and Kilmarnock before his death aged 30.

== Career ==
=== Club ===
Battles was born in Springburn, Glasgow, he moved to Midlothian when still a boy and played his early football with Broxburn and Bathgate, before joining Hearts in 1894, winning the Scottish Football League title the following year and then moving on to Celtic. He made his Celtic debut in the 2–1 away league win over Dundee on 10 August 1895 and won a League championship badge plus the Glasgow Cup in his maiden campaign.

Late in the 1895–96 season, after Celtic had won the championship, he left on loan for English club Liverpool, where he played in two league fixtures and three 'test' matches (effectively promotion/relegation playoffs) for them. Back at Celtic, he was suspended by the club in November 1896 and did not feature again during 1896–97, after he – plus Peter Meechan and John Divers – refused to take the field for a game due to being insulted by the presence of a journalist who had been highly critical of the team in their previous match (a loss to Rangers in the Glasgow Cup final).

Battles joined Dundee in April 1897 and would make 19 total appearances with 2 goals during the 1897–98 season, then played another League match for Liverpool in March 1898. He rejoined Celtic the following October, shortly after John Divers also returned; despite the pair's past indiscretion, the team's results had noticeably worsened in their absence. He remained in Glasgow for the next six years, with no further League titles but four consecutive appearances in Scottish Cup Finals, winning the first two in 1899 and 1900, and losing the others in 1901 (to former employers Hearts) and 1902.

=== International ===
He impressed Scottish selectors with his consistent performances and in 1901 he started all three Home International matches, his only full caps. Battles had already played for the Scottish League XI in 1899 and was selected again in 1902, and also turned out for the Glasgow Association against Sheffield in the same year.

=== Death ===
After leaving Celtic he subsequently moved to Kilmarnock before his death from pneumonia on 9 February 1905, at the age of 30, two weeks after falling ill following a match on 21 January. A reported 40,000 people lined the route to Dalbeth Cemetery in Glasgow's East End on the day of Battles' funeral. The monies taken from the stand at the 1905 Scotland v Ireland match at Celtic Park were donated by host club Celtic to the grieving Battles family in tribute to their former player.

Battles died before the birth of his son, Barney Battles Jr., who was named in his memory and would also go on to be a Scottish international, playing as a forward.
