= South Kirkby Colliery F.C. =

Association football club in England

South Kirkby Colliery
- Full name: South Kirkby Colliery Football Club
- Nicknames: The Kirkbyites, Kirkby
- Short name: SKCFC
- Founded: 1894; 132 years ago as South Kirkby
- Ground: Miners Welfare Ground, Millar's Walk, South Kirkby
- Manager: Richard Millward
- League: Sheffield & Hallamshire County Senior League Premier Division
- 2023–24: Sheffield & Hallamshire County Senior League Premier Division, 14th of 14
- Website: www.pitchero.com/clubs/southkirkbycolliery
Home colours

South Kirkby Colliery Football Club was a football club based in South Kirkby, West Yorkshire, England. The team played in the Sheffield & Hallamshire County Senior League Premier Division, the eleventh tier of the English football league system. Formed as South Kirkby the club were later adopted by the nearby colliery and eventually changed their name to South Kirkby Colliery.

In 1929-30 and 1940-41 the club won the Sheffield & Hallamshire Senior Cup, the oldest county cup in England. They are former members of the Yorkshire Football League and have played in the FA Cup on numerous occasions.

The club play at the Miners Welfare Ground, Millar's Walk, South Kirkby.

== History ==
=== Early years ===
The club were formed at least as early as 1894 as South Kirkby and went on to become the works team of South Kirkby Colliery. The earliest known fixture for the club is a postponed match in 1894, though it is not clear which competition this was. The club initially competed in the Minor Cup Division Two of the Barnsley Association Football Union in the 1894–95 season, before joining the Barnsley Association Football Union League Division A for the 1896–97 season, winning the Minor Cup that season. By the end of the 1898–99 season the club had suffered two successive relegations in the Barnsley Association Football Union league structure and spent the 1899–1900 and 1900–01 seasons outside that league system, returning to the Barnsley Association Football Union Minor Cup league for the 1901–02 season. The 1901–02 season was a successful one but due to the Barnsley Association Football Union altering its league system the Minor Cup league became the top division and the Junior Cup became the second division and despite being promoted the club remained in the Minor Cup league. What had been the top division, the Challenge Cup league, became a knockout competition. In the 1902–03 season the club joined the Sheffield Association League and used their place in the Barnsley Association Minor Cup league for the reserves. The club were well supported by the workers of the colliery, who donated a small sum from their wages per week, making the club quite well off, though the club were known as South Kirkby and not known as South Kirkby Colliery until later in their history, the first known use of the name was in the 1904–05 season.

=== Professionalism ===
In 1905–06 the club won the Sheffield Association League, the South Yorkshire League, the Hemsworth and District League, the Hemsworth and District Challenge Cup and narrowly missed out on a fifth title that season when they lost in the final of the Montague Hospital Cup for the second season in succession, in front of a crowd of over 5,000. The same season the club had a remarkable run in the FA Cup, eventually losing to Bishop Auckland in the fourth qualifying round (a club record). The season was one of the most successful in the club's history and led to a period of professionalism. By 1905 the club had signed James Aston formerly of Woolwich Arsenal and Small Heath and Edward Layton of Sheffield United, amongst a number of current and former professionals playing for the club in this era and moved into a new purpose built stadium of very high quality. In the 1911–12 season the club reached the semi-final of the Sheffield Challenge Cup and the final of the Wharncliffe Charity Cup. The final of the Wharncliffe Cup saw former Sheffield Wednesday outside left Jock Malloch return to familiar territory at Owlerton Stadium, where he faced his old rivals Sheffield United. Malloch also was a pivotal player in the club's run in the FA Cup that season. The club later joined the Sheffield Association League before moving into the Yorkshire League, later dropping down to the Doncaster and District Senior League in the late 1960s. The club now plays in the Sheffield and Hallamshire County Senior League.

=== Season-by-season record ===
Season	Division	Level	Position	FA Cup	Notes
1894–95	Barnsley & District Minor League	-		–	
1895–96	Barnsley & District Minor League	-		–	
1896–97	Barnsley & District Minor League	-	1st/5	–	League champions (won play-off)
1896–97	Barnsley Challenge Cup League	-		–	
1898–99	Barnsley & District Minor League	-	11th/11	–	
1899–00	Club did not enter any competitions				
1900–01	Club did not enter any competitions				
1901–02	Barnsley & District Minor League	-	1st/11	–	League champions (won play-off)
1902–03	Barnsley & District Minor League	-	8th/12	–	
1903–04	Sheffield Association League	-	12th/14	–	
1904–05	Sheffield Association League	-	3rd/7	–	
1905–06	Sheffield Association League	-	1st/13	–	League champions
1906–07	Sheffield Association League	-	1st/13	–	League champions
1907–08	Sheffield Association League	-	2nd/16	–	
1908–09	Sheffield Association League	-	2nd/15	–	
1909–10	Sheffield Association League	-	4th/14	–	
1910–11	Sheffield Association League	-		–	
1911–12	Sheffield Association League	-	3rd/16	–	
1912–13	Sheffield Association League	-	2nd/15	–	
1913–14	Sheffield Association League	-	1st/16	–	League champions
1914–15	Sheffield Association League	-		–	
1915–16	Sheffield Association League	-		–	
1919–20	Sheffield Association League	-		–	
1920–21	Sheffield Association League	-		–	
1921–22	Sheffield Association League	-		–	
1922–23	Sheffield Association League	-	13th/16	–	
1923–24	Sheffield Association League	-	17th/18	–	
1924–25	Sheffield Association League	-	4th/15	–	
1925–26	Doncaster & District Senior League	-		–	
1926–27	Doncaster & District Senior League	-		–	
1927–28	Doncaster & District Senior League	-	1st/12	–	League champions
1928–29	Doncaster & District Senior League	-	2nd/11	–	
1929–30	Sheffield Association League	-	3rd/15	–	League champions (won play-off)
1930–31	Sheffield Association League	-	1st/16	–	League champions (won play-off)
1931–32	Sheffield Association League	-	1st/13	–	Lost league play-off
1932–33	Sheffield Association League	-	2nd/12	–	
1933–34	Yorkshire League	-	2nd/13	–	
1934–35	Yorkshire League	-	8th/18	–	
1935–36	Yorkshire League	-	9th/20	–	
1936–37	Yorkshire League	-	4th/19	–	
1937–38	Yorkshire League	-	17th/20	–	
1938–39	Yorkshire League	-	14th/20	–	
1939–40	Sheffield Association League	-		–	
1940–41	Sheffield Association League	-		–	
1941–42	Sheffield Association League	-		–	
1942–43	Sheffield Association League	-		–	
1943–44	Sheffield Association League	-		–	
1944–45	Sheffield Association League	-		–	
1945–46	Yorkshire League	-	14th/15	2QR	
1946–47	Yorkshire League	-	14th/20	3QR	
1947–48	Yorkshire League	-	14th/20	1QR	
1948–49	Yorkshire League	-	19th/20	1QR	Relegated
1949–50	Yorkshire League Division 2	-	14th/18	PR	
1950–51	Yorkshire League Division 2	-	14th/17	PR	
1951–52	Yorkshire League Division 2	-	8th/13	2QR	
1952–53	Yorkshire League Division 2	-	4th/14	2QR	Promoted
1953–54	Yorkshire League Division 1	-	18th/18	1QR	Relegated
1954–55	Yorkshire League Division 2	-	5th/16	1QR	
1955–56	Yorkshire League Division 2	-	9th/16	–	
1956–57	Yorkshire League Division 2	-	5th/17	–	
1957–58	Yorkshire League Division 2	-	6th/14	–	
1958–59	Yorkshire League Division 2	-	5th/13	–	
1959–60	Yorkshire League Division 2	-	6th/15	–	
1960–61	Yorkshire League Division 2	-	7th/19	–	
1961–62	Yorkshire League Division 2	-	14th/14	–	
1962–63	Yorkshire League Division 2	-	14th/15	–	
1963–64	Yorkshire League Division 2	-	15th/15	–	
1964–65	Doncaster & District Senior League Division 3	-	2nd/13	–	Promoted
1965–66	Doncaster & District Senior League Division 2	-	4th/13	–	Promoted
1966–67	Doncaster & District Senior League Premier Division	-	4th/13	–	
1967–68	Doncaster & District Senior League Premier Division	-	3rd/14	–	
1968–69	Doncaster & District Senior League Premier Division	-	1st/12	–	League champions
1969–70	Doncaster & District Senior League Premier Division	-		–	
1970–71	Doncaster & District Senior League Premier Division	-		–	
1971–72	Doncaster & District Senior League Premier Division	-		–	
1972–73	Doncaster & District Senior League Premier Division	-		–	
1973–74	Doncaster & District Senior League Premier Division	-		–	
1974–75	Doncaster & District Senior League Premier Division	-		–	
1975–76	Doncaster & District Senior League Premier Division	-		–	
1976–77	Doncaster & District Senior League Premier Division	-		–	
1977–78	Doncaster & District Senior League Premier Division	-		–	
1978–79	Doncaster & District Senior League Premier Division	-		–	
1979–80	Doncaster & District Senior League Premier Division	-		–	
1980–81	Doncaster & District Senior League Premier Division	-		–	
1981–82	Doncaster & District Senior League Premier Division	-		–	
1982–83	Doncaster & District Senior League Premier Division	-		–	Relegated
1983–84	Doncaster & District Senior League Division 1	-		–	Relegated
1984–85	Doncaster & District Senior League Division 2	-		–	
1985–86	Doncaster & District Senior League Division 2	-	3rd/12	–	Promoted
1986–87	Doncaster & District Senior League Division 1	-	7th/11	–	
1987–88	Doncaster & District Senior League Division 1	-	8th/12	–	
1988–89	Doncaster & District Senior League Division 1	-	8th/12	–	
1989–90	Doncaster & District Senior League Division 1	-	1st/16	–	League champions, promoted
1990–91	Doncaster & District Senior League Premier Division	-	3rd/14	–	
1991–92	Doncaster & District Senior League Premier Division	-	8th/13	–	
1992–93	Doncaster & District Senior League Premier Division	-	6th/15	–	
1993–94	Doncaster & District Senior League Premier Division	-	4th/14	–	
1994–95	Doncaster & District Senior League Premier Division	-	6th/11	–	
1995–96	Doncaster & District Senior League Premier Division	-	1st/13	–	League champions
1996–97	Doncaster & District Senior League Premier Division	-	1st/14	–	League champions
1997–98	Doncaster & District Senior League Premier Division	-	1st/14	–	League champions
1998–99	Sheffield and Hallamshire County Senior League Division 2	-	6th/12	–	
1999–00	Sheffield and Hallamshire County Senior League Division 2	-	4th/10	–	
2000–01	Sheffield and Hallamshire County Senior League Division 2	-	1st/8	–	League champions, promoted
2001–02	Sheffield and Hallamshire County Senior League Division 1	-	2nd/14	–	Promoted
2002–03	Sheffield and Hallamshire County Senior League Premier Division	-	6th/13	–	
2003–04	Sheffield and Hallamshire County Senior League Premier Division	-	8th/14	–	
2004–05	Sheffield and Hallamshire County Senior League Premier Division	11	8th/14	–	
2005–06	Sheffield and Hallamshire County Senior League Premier Division	11	13th/14	–	Relegated
2006–07	Sheffield and Hallamshire County Senior League Division 1	12	11th/14	–	
2007–08	Sheffield and Hallamshire County Senior League Division 1	12	12th/13	–	
2009–09	Sheffield and Hallamshire County Senior League Division 1	12	11th/14	–	
2009–10	Sheffield and Hallamshire County Senior League Division 1	12	3rd/13	–	Promoted
2010–11	Sheffield and Hallamshire County Senior League Premier Division	11	6th/14	–	
2011–12	Sheffield and Hallamshire County Senior League Premier Division	11	10th/14	–	
2012–13	Sheffield and Hallamshire County Senior League Premier Division	11	15th/15	–	Relegated
2013–14	Sheffield and Hallamshire County Senior League Division 1	12	11th/14	–	
2014–15	Sheffield and Hallamshire County Senior League Division 1	12	8th/12	–	
2015–16	Sheffield and Hallamshire County Senior League Division 1	12	7th/13	–	
2016–17	Sheffield and Hallamshire County Senior League Division 1	12	2nd/14	–	Promoted
2017–18	Sheffield and Hallamshire County Senior League Premier Division	11	9th/15	–	
2018–19	Sheffield and Hallamshire County Senior League Premier Division	11	15th/15	–	
2019–20	Sheffield and Hallamshire County Senior League Premier Division	11	–	–	Season abandoned owing to COVID-19 pandemic
2020–21	Sheffield and Hallamshire County Senior League Premier Division	11	–	–	Season abandoned owing to COVID-19 pandemic
2021–22	Sheffield and Hallamshire County Senior League Premier Division	11	3rd/14	–	
2022–23	Sheffield and Hallamshire County Senior League Premier Division	11	12th/14	–	
2023–24	Sheffield and Hallamshire County Senior League Premier Division	11	TBD	–	
Season	Division	Level	Position	FA Cup	Notes
Source: Football Club History Database

== Nickname and kits ==
=== Nickname ===
By 1905, as the club grew, they were nicknamed The Kirkbyites. In later years, when the club was strongly connected to the colliery, the regional press often informally referred to the club as The Collierymen and similar variations.

=== Kits ===
South Kirkby's assumed original colours worn by the team.

It is believed that when the club was formed the shirts worn were red and green halves but over the years many different colours have been worn.

In modern history the club colours are traditionally blue and white, though many different designs of shirt have been worn vertical stripes and horizontal hoops are most often worn.

The team's away kit has changed in colour and design many times, no traditional design or colours have been used.

== Ground ==
=== Past grounds ===
It is not exactly known where the club played prior to 1904, though evidence exists that the club played at The Victoria Grounds. Not much is known about The Victoria Grounds other than that it was used by various clubs and sports as early as 1896. The earliest use of the ground by the club appears to have been an athletics meeting promoted by the club in 1898. The ground appears to have been located near to the Victoria Club on Carr Lane, South Kirkby, but its exact location has been lost.

The rising fortunes of the club and the signing of a number of professional players coincided with a move by the club to a new purpose built stadium near the colliery around 1904. No evidence of a formal name of the stadium exists other than The Colliery Athletic Ground, though one side of the stadium was called The Town End. The stadium was of such a high quality that it was said that the facilities "...excels those of many and English League club" and was said to "compare favourably with any club ground in Yorkshire".

=== Current ground ===
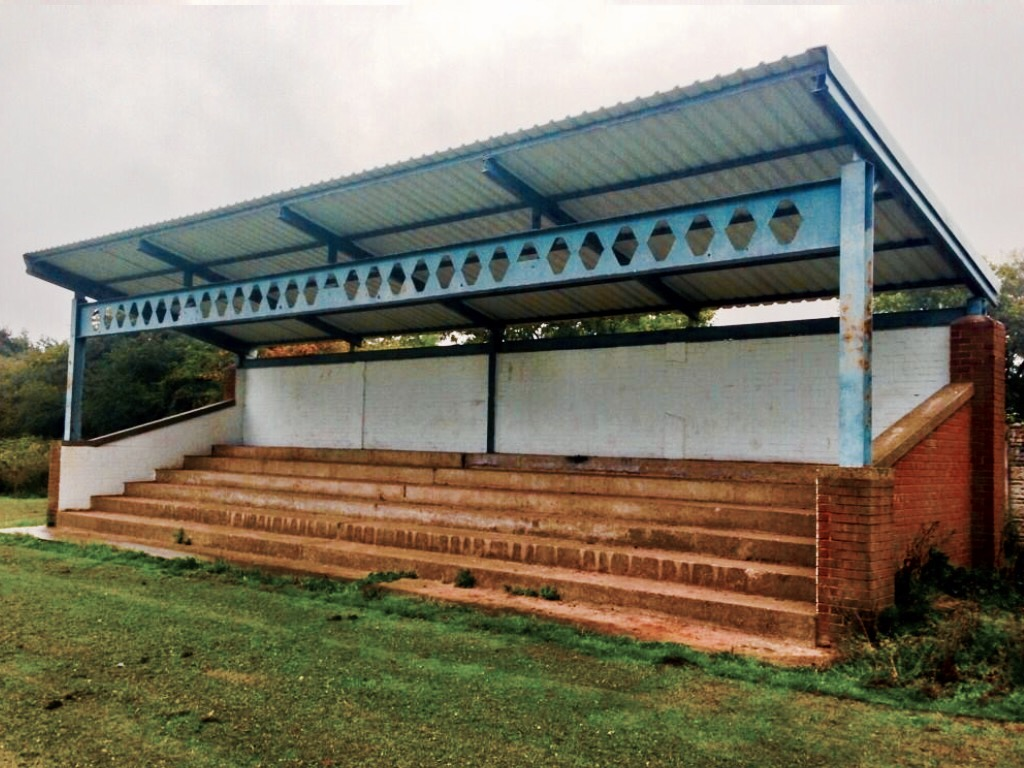
The main stand at the Miners Welfare Ground, home of South Kirkby Colliery Football Club.

The club play at the Miners Welfare Ground, Millar's Walk, in the village of South Kirkby, West Yorkshire. The area around the ground was formerly the site of the village windmill, which explains the occasional use of the name 'Millar's Walk' and 'Old Mill Ground' for the ground. The ground is also home to South Kirkby Cricket Club, whose cricket ground forms part of the facilities. In 1926 South Kirkby Colliery Company bought a new ground for use by all teams under the banner of the collieries athletics club, including South Kirkby Colliery and South Kirkby Cricket Club, they immediately made plans to build a pavilion on the ground. The football club immediately made the move to the new ground in time for the 1926/27 season. In May 1929 a new pavilion was officially opened by Herbert Sutcliffe. In 1932 the Miners Welfare Committee agreed to grant £1,000 for improvements to the ground. New floodlights were erected in the mid-1990s.

== Rivalry ==
South Kirkby Colliery's local rivals are nearby Frickley Athletic and Hemsworth Miners Welfare. Former South Kirkby Colliery manager Wayne Benn later became manager of Hemsworth Miners Welfare. In the early years of the club's existence there was a fierce rivalry with Rotherham County and Rotherham Town, with whom they notably battled in the FA Cup.

== Honours ==
League

- Barnsley Association Football Union Minor Cup
  - Winners 1896–97, 1901–02
- South Yorkshire League
  - Winners 1905–06
- Hemsworth and District League
  - Winners 1905–06
- Sheffield Association League
  - Winners 1905–06, 1906–07, 1913–14, 1929–30, 1930–31
- Doncaster and District Senior League Premier Division
  - Winners 1927–28, 1930–31, 1968–69, 1995–96, 1996–97, 1997–98
- Yorkshire Football League
  - Runners-up 1933–34
- Doncaster and District Senior League Division Two
  - Winners 1988–89, 1996/97
- Doncaster and District Senior League Division One
  - Winners 1989–90
- Sheffield and Hallamshire County Senior Football League Division Two
  - Winners 2000–01

Cup

- Mexborough Montagu Charity Cup
  - Runners-up 1904–05, 1905–06
- Barnsley Challenge Cup
  - Runners-up 1904-05
- Hemsworth and District Challenge Cup
  - Winners 1905–06
- Yorkshire Pit Boys League
  - Winners 1908–09
- Wharncliffe Charity Cup
  - Runners-up 1911–12
- Hemsworth Hospital Cup
  - Runners-up 1924–25
- Sheffield and Hallamshire Senior Cup
  - Winners 1929–30, 1940–41
- Doncaster and District Senior League D.D.F.A. Challenge Cup
  - Winners 2008–09, 2009–10

== Records ==
- Record FA Cup appearance: Fourth qualifying round 1905–06, 1912–13, 1929–30

== Former players and managers ==
=== Former players ===
Notable players to have played for the club include:

- James Aston
- Frank Biggins
- Jack Bradley
- Martin Bradley
- Robert Caldwell
- William Capstick
- Robert Carlin
- Jack Cartright
- Albert Coleman
- Walter Coulston
- Christopher Crapper
- Stephen Ford
- Dennis Grainger
- Edward Layton
- W. Edmund Livingstone
- Jock Malloch
- Fred Martin
- Jimmy Massey
- Albert Milton
- James Picken
- Tom Smalley
- Clement Smith
- John Willie Sutcliffe
- Frank Wildman

=== Internationals ===
Players to have played for the club and have earned full international caps include England goalkeeper John Willie Sutcliffe, who joined the club in 1913 and right-half Tom Smalley, who began his career with the club before being capped by England in 1936.

=== Managers ===
Notable former managers include:

- Wayne Benn

== FA Cup ==
The club first played in the FA Cup in the 1905–06 season, reaching the fourth qualifying round where they lost to Bishop Auckland. The game was such a draw for locals that special services were run from Moorthorpe Railway Station for fans wanting to travel up to the game. The club once again reached the fourth qualifying round in 1912–1913 and 1929–1930.

=== FA Cup results ===
Season	Round	Opponent	Result	Replay
1905–06	First qualifying round	(England) Rotherham Main	2–2	4–0
1905–06	Second qualifying round	(England) Rotherham County	2–1	
1905–06	Third qualifying round	(England) Rotherham Town	2–2	1–0
1905–06	Fourth qualifying round	(England) Bishop Auckland	1–0	
1906–07	Preliminary round	(England) Rotherham County	2–4	
1907–08	Preliminary round	(England) Darfield United	6–1	
1907–08	First qualifying round	(England) Mexborough Town	1–0	
1907–08	Second qualifying round	(England) Rotherham Town	3–0	
1908–08	Preliminary round	(England) Bradford Park Avenue	8–1	
1909–10	First qualifying round	(England) Stourton United	1–1	5–0
1909–10	Second qualifying round	(England) Clayton West	1–5	
1909–10	Third qualifying round	(England) Huddersfield Town	5–2	
