= Francis Joseph Biggins =

English footballer

Frank Biggins
Personal information
- Full name: Francis Joseph Biggins
- Date of birth: 24 June 1884
- Place of birth: Brownhills, Staffordshire, England
- Date of death: 1962 (age 77)
- Position: Forward

Senior career*
Years	Team	Apps	(Gls)
?–1908	South Kirkby		
1908–1911	Barnsley		
1911–?	Castleford Town		
- * Club domestic league appearances and goals

Frank Biggins (24 June 1884 – 1962) was an English footballer who played as an outside right for South Kirkby, Barnsley and Castleford Town.

== Early life ==
Biggins was born and raised in Brownhills, Staffordshire, the eldest of nine children born to John Biggins, a coal miner, and Elizabeth Biggins (née Wilton). By 1901, the teenaged Biggins was also working as a coal miner in Brownhills before moving to Yorkshire, where he boarded with Yorkshire footballer Harry Ness.

== Playing career ==
Biggins began his football career with South Kirkby before being signed by Barnsley in May 1908. In August 1911, he left Oakwell for Castleford Town.
