= James Picken (footballer) =

English footballer

Personal information
- Place of birth: England
- Position: Goalkeeper

Youth career
- South Kirkby Common Road

Senior career*
Years	Team	Apps	(Gls)
?–1934	South Kirkby		
1934–1935	Doncaster Rovers		
1935–1935	Frickley Colliery		
1935–?	Denaby United		
?–1939	South Kirkby		
1939–?	Frickley Colliery		
- South Kirkby
- * Club domestic league appearances and goals

James Picken was an English footballer who played as a goalkeeper for South Kirkby and Doncaster Rovers.

== Playing career ==
Picken began his football career as a junior with South Kirkby Common Road before joining South Kirkby, where he was taken on trial by Doncaster Rovers, who signed him in August 1934. In April 1935 he joined Frickley Colliery then in August 1935 he moved to Denaby United. He later returned to South Kirkby, where he played in the Yorkshire League, before re-joining local rivals Frickley on trial in February 1939 but returned to South Kirkby to end his career.
