= Bob Allan =

Scottish footballer (1872–1918)

Personal information
- Date of birth: 10 February 1872
- Place of birth: Lesmahagow, Scotland
- Date of death: 14 November 1918 (aged 46)
- Place of death: Newton, Scotland
- Position: Outside right

Senior career*
Years	Team	Apps	(Gls)
1896–1897	Dundee	8	(1)
1899–1900	Thames Ironworks	21	(1)
1900–1903	West Ham United	52	(1)
Total		81	(3)
- * Club domestic league appearances and goals

Robert Allan (10 February 1872 – 14 November 1918) was a Scottish footballer who played as an outside-right for West Ham United and its predecessor club Thames Ironworks. He had previously played for Dundee.

Allan started his career at Dundee, making 11 total appearances and scoring 4 goals, including a hat-trick in a Scottish Cup match against King's Park in January 1897. Finding first-team opportunities limited, he joined Thames Ironworks in 1899. There, he made 22 consecutive appearances in the Southern League Division One, between his debut against Southampton on 16 December and the end-of-season test match against Fulham on 30 April. Usually occupying the outside-right position, he was also played at inside-left and at right-half. His only goal came in a 4–1 victory over Southampton on 9 April 1900. He also made seven consecutive appearances in the Thames & Medway Combination. After the winding up of Thames Ironworks and the formation of West Ham United, Allan continued to play for the new club, making 57 appearances over three seasons. His only goal for United came against Wellingborough Town on 27 December 1901.

The club handbook from 1900 to 1901 featured the following description of Allan:

Shows excellant judgement in everything he does, and can take hard knocks and play on as game as ever. Centres on the run, and occasionally contributes a long shot with plenty of steam behind it. Doesn't neglect his inside man and, although weighty, can show a rare turn of speed when necessary.

== Bibliography ==
- Hogg, Tony (2005). Who's Who of West Ham United. Profile Sports Media. p. 15. ISBN 1-903135-50-8.
- Northcutt, John; Marsh, Steve (2015). West Ham United: The Complete Record. deCoubertin Books. ISBN 978-1-909245-27-3.
- Powles, John (2005). Iron in the Blood. Nottingham: SoccerData. ISBN 1-899468-22-6.
