= Davie Willocks =

Scottish footballer

Personal information
- Full name: David King Willocks
- Date of birth: 6 January 1871
- Place of birth: Arbroath, Scotland
- Date of death: 1950 (aged 78–79)
- Position: Inside forward

Senior career*
Years	Team	Apps	(Gls)
1891–1892	Arbroath		
1892–1894	Bolton Wanderers	32	(8)
1894–1896	Burton Swifts	58	(25)
1896–1898	Dundee	35	(15)
1898–1900	Brighton United		
1900	Arbroath		
Total		125	(48)
- * Club domestic league appearances and goals

David King Willocks (6 January 1871 – 1950) was a Scottish footballer who played in the Football League for Bolton Wanderers and Burton Swifts, and in the Scottish Football League for Dundee.
