= Ossett Town A.F.C. =

Coordinates: 53°40′53.51″N 1°34′39.13″W

Ossett Town Juniors FC
- Full name: Ossett Town Association Football & Social Club
- Nicknames: The Town, The Reds, Ingfielders
- Founded: 1936
- Dissolved: 2018 (merged with Ossett Albion to form Ossett United)
- Ground: Ingfield, Ossett
- Capacity: 1,950
- Website: https://ossetttownjnr.com/
| Home colours | Away colours |

Ossett Town Association Football Club was an English football club based in Ossett in West Yorkshire.

== History ==
Ossett Town AFC were formed in 1936 when, during a public meeting, the Mayor of the Borough of Ossett charged John Carter, a former Yorkshire League Referee, with bringing Ossett a football team.

In 2003–04 the club won promotion to the NPL Premier Division and competed for seven seasons before a relegation at the end of the 2010–11 season, and the first since 1980.

=== 1936–1969: the early years ===
The club started out in the Leeds League, which was renamed The West Yorkshire League in 1939, before switching to the Heavy Woollen League, so called due to the heavyweight cloth manufactured in the area during the Second World War.

After the war, in 1945, Ossett Town joined the Yorkshire League. In 1948–49 the club recorded a record victory in the Extra Preliminary Round of the FA Cup, beating David Brown Athletic 11–0 away from home. In 1949–50 the club won the West Riding County Senior Cup, its first honour, and finished the season in a club high third place, scoring 120 goals in the process.

During this period, and through into the 1950s the Yorkshire League contained the 'A' teams of Leeds United, Huddersfield Town as well as both Sheffield sides, Doncaster Rovers and Barnsley, at this time often topped the 1000 mark.

With these sides came players including John Charles, Denis Law, Ray Wilson, Peter Swan, Tommy Taylor and Jack Charlton.

Derrick Blackburn was sold to Swansea Town (now Swansea City), in 1957 for £1,350 and with this newfound wealth the club bought the Ingfield site, where the club still play to this day. Previously the team had played on a pitch behind the Fern House Working Men's Club on Wakefield Road as well as a pitch on Back Lance after the Army had commandeered Fern House during the Second World War.

The club moved to the new Ingfield ground in 1959, just after being relegated from Division One and celebrated the first season at Ingfield with a 3rd-place finish and promotion straight back to the First Division of the Yorkshire League, as well as a first West Riding County Cup success but had a second relegation in 1960–61.

=== 1970–1982: the Yorkshire League ===
Following a restructure of the Yorkshire League the club found itself in the third division in 1970, by which time long=serving player Frank Lloyd, who would spend 50 years with Ossett Town, became manager. He signed two former Newcastle United and Huddersfield Town strikers Len White (who scored 153 goals for Newcastle) and Jim Kerray.

During this period Graham Firth joined the playing staff as a teenager and would go on to become the club's first commercial manager as well as groundsman, barman and long-serving chairman. Frank Lloyd relinquished the managerial role and became club secretary.

Through the '70s the club climbed from the third division to the first division before returning to the second Division in 1980, where they finished as runners up during the final season of the Yorkshire League.

=== 1982–1999: Northern Counties East League ===
Following the merger with the Midlands League the North East Counties League (NCEL) was formed. 1982 also saw Town collect its final County Cup win in a 2–0 victory over Bradley Rangers at Huddersfield Town's Leeds Road.

Graham Firth began his 28-year stint as chairman in the mid-1980s. In 1987, floodlights were erected for the first time, new dressing rooms built, the clubhouse extended and the pitch re-laid at considerable cost.

Micky Bullock was appointed as manager and the club hosted Manchester United in a pre-season friendly where Lee Sharpe made his debut. A club record attendance of 2,600 was also set. Local businessman Peter Wilkinson joined the committee as football chairman, as Graham Firth ran the off-field side of the club.

The club won the NCEL second division title that season before a second promotion saw them start the 1990–91 season in the NCEL Premier Division. The 1989–90 season was the last time the club won a trophy, lifting the NCEL League Cup thanks to a shock victory over FA Vase finalist Bridlington Town, who were managed by future Town boss John Reed.

The club had nine consecutive seasons in the Premier Division as they slowly prepared for the next step up in the pyramid. They achieved this at the end of the 1998–99 season when promotion to the Northern Premier League (NPL) was gained thanks to a second-place finish. Ossett Albion came first that season, but due to ground grading issues, something that was to affect Ossett Town a few years later, promotion was denied, and Town took the opportunity handed to them.

However, founder John Carter did not see the club reach the NPL, dying in 1994 age 88 after having performed every off-field role at the club including chairman, secretary and manager.

=== 1999–2004: the Northern Premier League First Division ===
Gary Brook was player manager at this time, and following promotion guided the club to two eighth-place finishes in the NPL First Division, a mention in The Sun as their team of the week after a 7–1 away win at Whitley Bay, and also a run to the second round of the FA Trophy when 1,100 people came to Ingfield to see former League side Doncaster Rovers sneak away with a 1–0 victory.

Ossett Town's third season in the NPL, 2001–02, saw Town win their opening four games scoring 12 times. The season ended with a second-place finish, an automatic promotion place, as ground improvements were delayed twelve hours due to inclement weather and promotion denied.

Gary Brook remained at the club, but a number of players moved on. The Reds ended the following season in 20th place, ten points above the relegation places.

The 2003–04 season saw a league re-structure with the introduction of the conference North and South, and the club were promoted to the NPL Premier Division. Scott Cooper replaced Brook but was soon replaced by Steve Richards.

=== 2004–2011: the Northern Premier League Premier Division ===
Richards took Town to the fourth qualifying round of the FA Cup in 2005–06, the club's best run to date. They beat Stocksbridge Park Steels, Consett and Matlock Town to set up a home tie with Leamington Spa, with the winners earning a place in the FA Cup first round.

In front of 900 people Leamington Spa progressed to earn a trip to Colchester United, where the League side progressed thanks to a 9–1 win. Despite the Cup run the league form deserted Town. Richards was replaced by Steve Kittrick.

The Reds ended the season in 11th place and topped that in 2006–07 with a tenth-place finish, the club's highest league position in the Football Pyramid.

Things took a downward turn the following year. Despite a positive start to the season relegation was only avoided on goal difference as Kittrick left the club for Guiseley and a number of players followed him. Simon Collins took the helm and despite being favourites for relegation ended the season in 12th.

During that year, Frank Lloyd died at age 81. In honour of his 50 years at the club the Directors room was renamed the Frank Lloyd Hospitality Suite in his memory.

There were more managerial changes as Collins left the club to be replaced by Mick Couzens and Paul Lines. The duo clashed, and Couzens left the club. Lines remained in control until the appointment of former Wolves player Peter Daniels. He left before the end of the 2009–10 season and Lines took over again. The club finished fourth bottom.

Phil Sharpe oversaw the 2010–11 season, assisted by two former Town players, Paul Sykes and Mark Wilson. But with money tight, the club were relegated from the Premier Division.

=== 2011–2018: the Northern Premier League First Division North ===
Sharpe retained the manager's role for the return to the NPL First Division North and was assisted by the experienced Eric Gilchrist, the latter ending the season in charge after Sharpe stood down.

2012–13 started with the appointment of an eleventh manager in ten seasons as Craig Elliott joined the club from NCEL side Glasshoughton Welfare, there was a large turnover of players in Elliott's 18 months at the club, 2012–13 ended with a 12th-place finish, a run to the first round of the FA Trophy and were a missed penalty away from taking FC Halifax Town to extra time in the Semi Final of the West Riding County Cup.

The Club started the following season more positive than any other in recent seasons, then at the club AGM Graham Firth stood down as chairman after 28 years in the role, taking up the position of Honorary President. The members of the club unanimously voted the club's Junior chairman, James Rogers, as Firth's replacement.

Under Elliott the side performed well in the League, going on a run of only three defeats in 23 games. Elliott decided he could not take the club any further and resigned his position of manager just 24 hours before a key game, taking up a position at a club in the NCEL First Division. The committee appointed captain Steven Jeff as caretaker manager, and he oversaw two games for the club.

Under Jeff the side took four points; it could easily have been six but for two penalties conceded in injury time in a 3–3 draw with New Mills.

The experienced John Reed was appointed as manager, assisted by Clive Freeman as the club ended the season in eighth place despite changes to the squad that were forced with only three months of the season remaining.

On 2 June 2015, former chairman Graham Firth died following a short illness.

The side continued to struggle in the First Division North and in September Reed left the club by mutual consent, his replacement, Graham Nicholas from NCEL side Garforth Town could not halt the slide, winning just one point from his eleven games. The club's committee acted and he was relieved of his position as the club looked to be heading to the NCEL for the first time in almost 20 years.

The committee, led by Rogers, took the bold step of appointing untried Grant Black in his first managerial role. With him Black brought Steve Ridley, who would combine playing duties with that of Assistant Manager. Mick Norbury, who began his playing career with the club in 1987, came in as coach.

Danny Frost signed from Ossett Albion and former Doncaster Rovers striker Alex Peterson joined him upfront. Both players scored on their debuts as Town recorded their first win in five months, a victory that started an excellent run, Black led Town to a higher league position than the previous season.

Black strengthened the side considerably over the summer. Ossett Town finished in 4th place, earning a play-off place.

Town shocked Scarborough Athletic on their own ground in the semi-final with a 3–1 victory for The Reds, that set up a final with Farsley Celtic. However, despite taking the lead in the final during the 87th minute, the home side drew level during seven minutes of time added on. That late goal gave Farsley Celtic the momentum going into extra time and they took advantage to win the game.

In 2018, it was announced that Ossett Town and Ossett Albion would merge to form Ossett United.

== Stadium ==
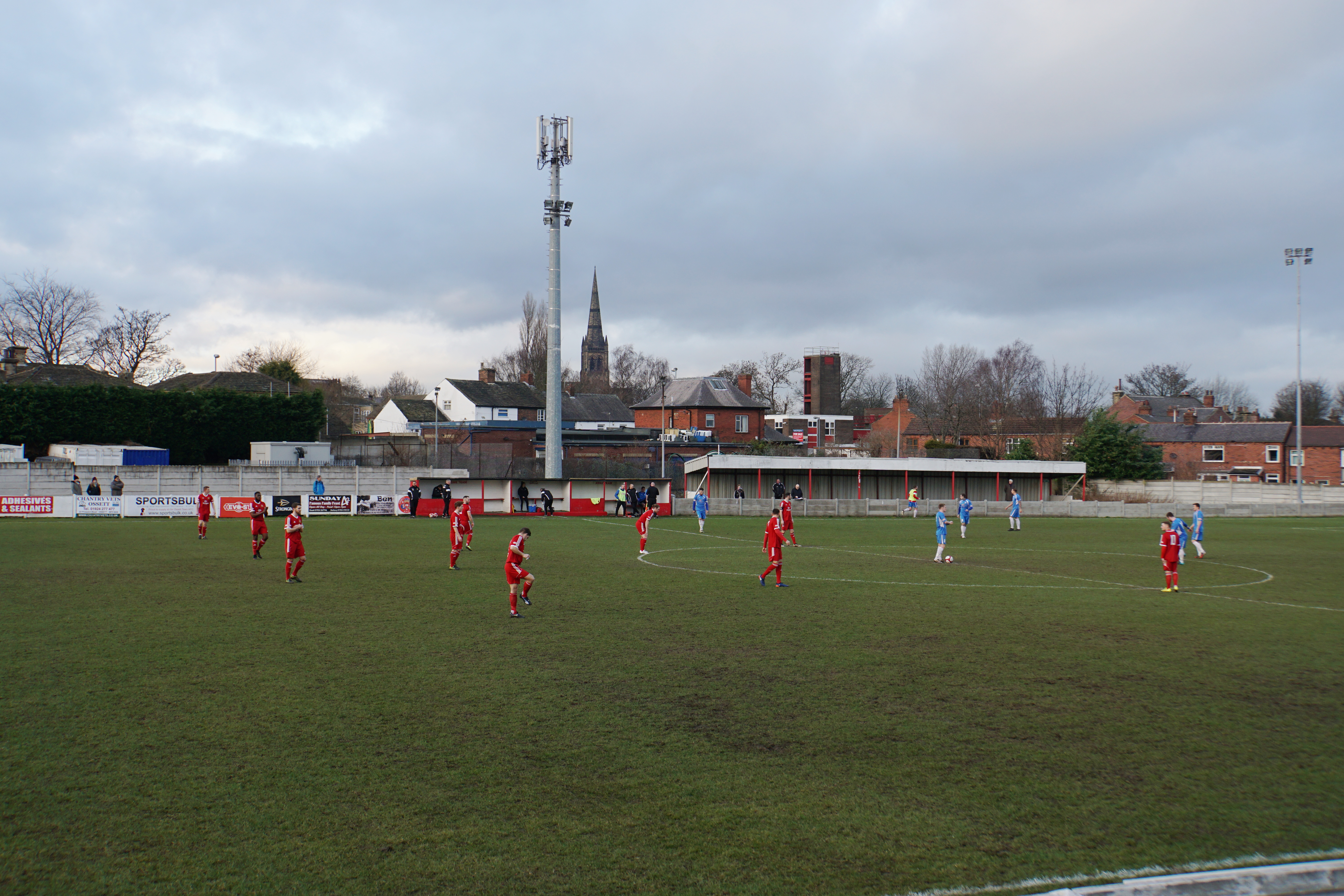
Ossett Town playing at Ingfield in 2017.

Ossett Town played at Ingfield on Prospect Road in Ossett. The site was bought in 1957 after the sale of Derrick Blackburn to Swansea Town. The first season at Ingfield saw Ossett Town win promotion from the Yorkshire League Division Two.

A new stand was built at the Prospect Road end which was eventually seated, new changing rooms as well as additional terracing and covered areas.

The Club House has been expanded on two occasions, the main room as renovated in 2014 and the old member's room is being modernised in 2017.

During the 1980s the club were in discussion with the West Riding FA for Ingfield to be the new headquarters. However, talks fell through, and the County eventually developed their own ground in Woodlesford.

There was also talk of Dewsbury RLFC moving to Ingfield when their previous ground was sold; however, they moved to a purpose build site in Shaw Cross. Ingfield has played host to many cup finals and representative games, including the NCEL cup finals 1991, 1993 and 1994, many West Riding County Cup finals, Wakefield Sunday League finals, Garforth Junior League finals and Heavy Woollen FA finals.

In 1995 a match between the British Army and the All England Fire Service was held at Ingfield and in 1999 the Women's FA Cup Semi-final between Croydon and Leeds United. Ingfield has also been used for many charity events, most recently in May 2017 when £17,000 was raised by Darren Powell for Macmillan Cancer Research and the Bradley Lowery Fund, for a game contested by various celebrities.

The current capacity is 1,950 with the record attendance of 2,600 being set in 1988 during a friendly with Manchester United.

Ingfield has been subject to a number of offers to buy the ground for development. These offers have been considered in the past and a potential new site sought out, but the sale did not go through as the members voted against it in 2006.

Another offer was made, and Ossett Town considered ground sharing with Dewsbury Rams RLFC but again members voted against the plan.

== Honours ==
- West Riding County Senior Cup
  - Winners: 1949–50
- West Riding County Cup
  - Winners: 1958–59, 1981–82
  - Runners Up: 2000–01
- West Yorkshire Association Football League Division Two
  - 3rd Place: 1959–60 (Promoted)
  - Promoted: 1977–78
  - Runners-up: 1981–82
- West Yorkshire Association Football League Division Three
  - Promoted: 1972–73, 1975–76
- Northern Counties East Football League Division Two:
  - Champions: 1988–89
- Northern Counties East Football League Division One:
  - Runners Up: 1998–99
- Northern Counties East Football League League Cup
  - Winners: 1989–90
- Northern Premier League First Division:
  - Runners-up: 2001–02
- Northern Premier League Chairman's Cup
  - Runners-up: 2005–06
- Northern Premier League First Division North Play-offs
  - Runners-up: 2016–17

== Records ==
- Best FA Cup performance: fourth qualifying round replay – 2017–18
- Best FA Trophy performance: Second round – 1999–2000
- Best FA Vase performance: Last 16 – 1988–89
- Highest League Finish: Tenth in the Northern Premier League Premier Division – 2006–07
- Record attendance: 2600 v Manchester United (Friendly) 1988–89
