= Bradford United F.C. =

Bradford United
- Full name: Bradford United Football Club

Bradford United F.C. was an English football club based in Bradford, West Yorkshire.

== History ==
The club was a member of the Yorkshire Football League from 1945 to 1948 and from 1950 to 1951.
