= George Ferguson (footballer, born 1872) =

Scottish footballer

Personal information
- Full name: George Ferguson
- Date of birth: 5 January 1872
- Place of birth: Dundee, Scotland
- Date of death: 1898 (aged 25–26)
- Position: Inside forward

Senior career*
Years	Team	Apps	(Gls)
1892–1893	Dundee Harp		
1893–1896	Bolton Wanderers	16	(3)
1896–1897	Rochdale		
1897–1898	Dundee	2	(0)
Total		18	(3)
- * Club domestic league appearances and goals

George Ferguson (5 January 1872 – 1898) was a Scottish footballer who played in the Football League for Bolton Wanderers and in the Scottish Football League for Dundee.
