= Charles Burgess (footballer) =

Scottish footballer

Personal information
- Full name: Charles Millar Burgess
- Date of birth: 20 November 1873
- Place of birth: Montrose, Scotland
- Date of death: 1960 (aged 86–87)
- Position: Full back

Senior career*
Years	Team	Apps	(Gls)
1894–1895	Montrose		
1895–1896	Dundee	17	(0)
1896	Sunderland	0	(0)
1896–1898	Dundee	27	(0)
1898–1900	Millwall Athletic		
1900–1901	Newcastle United	30	(0)
1901–1903	Portsmouth		
1903	Montrose		
Total		74	(0)
- * Club domestic league appearances and goals

Charles Millar Burgess (20 November 1873 – 1960) was a Scottish footballer who played in the Football League for Newcastle United, and in the Scottish Division One for Dundee.
