= Joe Clark (footballer, born 1874) =

Scottish footballer

Joseph Carter Clark (1874 – unknown) was a Scottish footballer. His regular position was as an inside forward. He was born in Dundee.

He played for Dundee, Brighton United, Newton Heath, Dunfermline Athletic and East Fife.
