= Willie McArthur =

Scottish footballer

Personal information
- Full name: William McArthur
- Date of birth: 17 August 1870
- Place of birth: Neilston, Scotland
- Date of death: 1948 (aged 77–78)
- Position: Centre forward

Senior career*
Years	Team	Apps	(Gls)
1890–1891	Renton Union		
1891–1892	Sunderland Albion		
1892–1893	Middlesbrough Ironopolis		
1893–1894	Bolton Wanderers	19	(6)
1894–1896	Leicester Fosse	55	(27)
1896–1897	Dundee	11	(4)
1898–1900	Brighton United		
1900	Worthing		
Total		85	(37)
- * Club domestic league appearances and goals

William McArthur (17 August 1870 – 1948) was a Scottish footballer who played in the Football League for Bolton Wanderers and Leicester Fosse, and in the Scottish Football League with Dundee.
