= Brighton United F.C. =

Brighton United
- Full name: Brighton United Football Club
- Founded: pre 1898
- Dissolved: 1900
- Ground: County Cricket Ground
- 1899–1900: 16th, Southern Football League – Record expunged
Home colours

Brighton United F.C. were an association football club based in Brighton, Sussex who were active for a few years at the end of the 19th century.

== History ==
The club joined the Southern League in 1898. Their first match was at Southampton where they played the inaugural match at the hosts' new stadium, The Dell, on 3 September 1898. In their first match Brighton fielded a team including nine Scottish players, several of whom had played in the Football League, including the scorer of their consolation goal in a 4–1 defeat, Roddy McLeod.

Former Football League or Scottish Football League players included:

- Jock Caldwell, full back formerly with Woolwich Arsenal
- Joe Clark, inside forward formerly with Dundee
- Patrick Farrell, centre half formerly with Woolwich Arsenal
- Billy Hendry, full back formerly with West Bromwich Albion, Stoke, Preston North End and Sheffield United
- William Longair, centre half formerly with Newton Heath, Sunderland and Burnley
- Willie McArthur, forward, formerly with Bolton Wanderers, Leicester Fosse and Dundee
- Francis McAvoy, wing half formerly with Woolwich Arsenal
- Roddy McLeod, forward, formerly with West Bromwich Albion and Leicester Fosse

Maurice Parry played for Brighton United in the 1899–1900 season, before having a long career with Liverpool and making 16 appearances for Wales.

Brighton were moderately successful in their first season in the Southern League finishing in tenth place (out of 13), but they had over-reached themselves financially and were forced to release McLeod and several other players before the end of the season. They started the 1899–1900 season but resigned in March 1900 with four games left to play, with their record then being expunged.

== Colours ==
The club's colours were green and white, originally as green shirts and white shorts, and later as stripes.

== Ground ==
The club played at the County Cricket Ground, Hove.
