= Michael Knighton =

English businessman (born 1951)

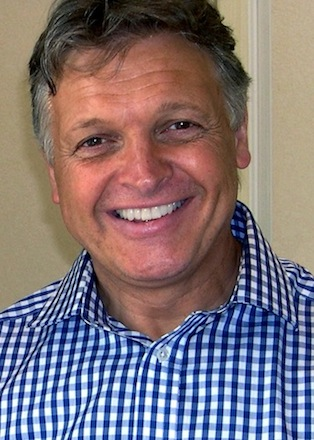
- Born: 4 October 1951 (age 75); Derbyshire, England
- Education: St Cuthbert's Society, Durham
- Occupation: Entrepreneur
- Years active: 1980–present
- Website: www.michaelknighton.co.uk

Michael Knighton
Youth career
- Years: Team
- 1965–1967: Derby County
- 1967: Everton
- 1967–1969: Coventry City

Managerial career
- 1997–1998: Carlisle United

Michael Knighton (born 4 October 1951) is an English businessman, best known for his involvement in Manchester United and Carlisle United football clubs. Knighton first came to prominence in 1989 for his aborted £20 million bid to buy Manchester United, which resulted in him taking a seat on the club's board.

== Early life ==
The son of a baker, Knighton grew up in Derbyshire and was a footballer in his youth. His great-grandfather, Willie Layton, was part of Sheffield Wednesday's 1903 and 1904 league championship-winning teams, and also the FA Cup-winning team of 1907. While still a schoolboy, Knighton trained with Derby County, and later spent a few months as an apprentice at Everton before leaving due to homesickness, and then spent over a year as an apprentice at Coventry City. However, his football career was cut short due to a thigh injury. He studied at Durham University's Bede College, where he gained a degree in physical education, before returning to St Cuthbert's College, Durham, to study philosophy, politics, and Mandarin Chinese. He became a teacher in physical education and geography, and took a position at St. David's School (now Huddersfield Grammar School) in 1976. He was appointed headmaster in 1980, and bought the school in 1983. He stopped teaching in 1984 to focus on property interests.

== Manchester United takeover ==
Knighton first came to the attention of the public in August 1989, when he made a takeover bid of £20 million for Manchester United. At the time, this was a record figure for a British football club and the offer was accepted by chief executive Martin Edwards. Knighton promised to invest £10 million in the team's stadium, Old Trafford, as well as re-establish the club as England's top side. Knighton appeared on the pitch at Old Trafford before the opening game of the 1989–90 season against Arsenal, dressed in a full Manchester United football kit as a public relations exercise intended to convince the club's supporters that he was a genuine football fan. Famously, he showed off his football skills by completing a long series of "keepie uppies". United beat Arsenal 4–1 on the day. The vehicle for the takeover was a Knighton-controlled company, MK Trafford Holdings, based in the Isle of Man and set up specifically for the purpose. A £10m contract for Edwards' 50.06% stake was signed, subject to an audit of the club's accounts, with a £20 per share offer submitted to the club's other shareholders. The MK Trafford investors comprised Knighton, former Debenhams executive Bob Thornton and Stanley Cohen of the Betterware home shopping company. However, Thornton and Cohen pulled out in mid-September. Knighton sought other backers, with David Murray and Owen Oyston among those approached. Knighton proved to Martin Edwards and his legal team that he had secured funds to complete the deal, but as the deadline to complete the takeover loomed, Knighton abandoned his bid for control in exchange for a seat on the board.

== Carlisle United ==
In 1992, Knighton left his job on the Manchester United board after buying out Carlisle United, a football club based in the Cumbrian city of Carlisle. At the time, Carlisle United were in the bottom division of the Football League and Knighton set about building up the club who he claimed he could return to the top league of English football, the Premier League (Carlisle had previously played at that level in the 1974–75 season).

Initial success saw Carlisle win Division Three and achieve promotion in 1995 with a record number of 91 points, which remains a club record today, as well as reaching the final of the Football League Trophy; they were relegated the following season but promoted back again to Division Two in 1997. In 1997 they also reached a second Football League Trophy final, beating Colchester United on penalties.

In 1996, Knighton threatened to sue the local newspaper, the Evening News and Star, and resign from the football club after being "publicly humiliated" over claims he and his wife Rosemary had seen a UFO in 1976.

After a poor start to the 1997–98 season, Knighton dismissed popular manager Mervyn Day and took over the management and coaching of the team himself. The move proved unsuccessful, and Carlisle were relegated back to Division Three. He kept himself as head coach until December 1998, when he handed the job over to Nigel Pearson. Knighton remained chairman of the club, but no longer had the financial resources to achieve another promotion. Carlisle struggled in the bottom division, only avoiding relegation to the Football Conference with a last-minute goal by goalkeeper Jimmy Glass, in what is one of football's most famous comebacks.

Knighton became increasingly unpopular with fans, a group of whom formed an independent supporters' trust, known initially as CCUIST and today as The United Trust, to protest against his control and lobby for more fan involvement in the club. Brooks Mileson twice attempted to buy Knighton's stake in Carlisle, in 1999 and 2001, but the two were unable to reach an agreement. Irishman John Courtenay was later backed to take over, but negotiations were protracted and Knighton fired manager Roddy Collins for his comments over the deal. Eventually, after Carlisle were put into voluntary administration, Courtenay purchased the club from Knighton in July 2002 and reinstated Collins.

On 25 June 2015, Knighton commented on the Carlisle United takeover bid from a reputed billionaire. Knighton was quoted as saying "If this person is a genuine billionaire, or even if he’s just extremely wealthy, and if he’s legitimately interested, then this has now been going on too long. He needs to be transparent, to say that this is who I am and this is where the club will be at the end of my ownership. At the end of the day, the club is a community asset, and any owner should respect that"

Since leaving Carlisle United in 2002, Knighton has not returned to the city. However Knighton stated he would return if invited.

== After football ==
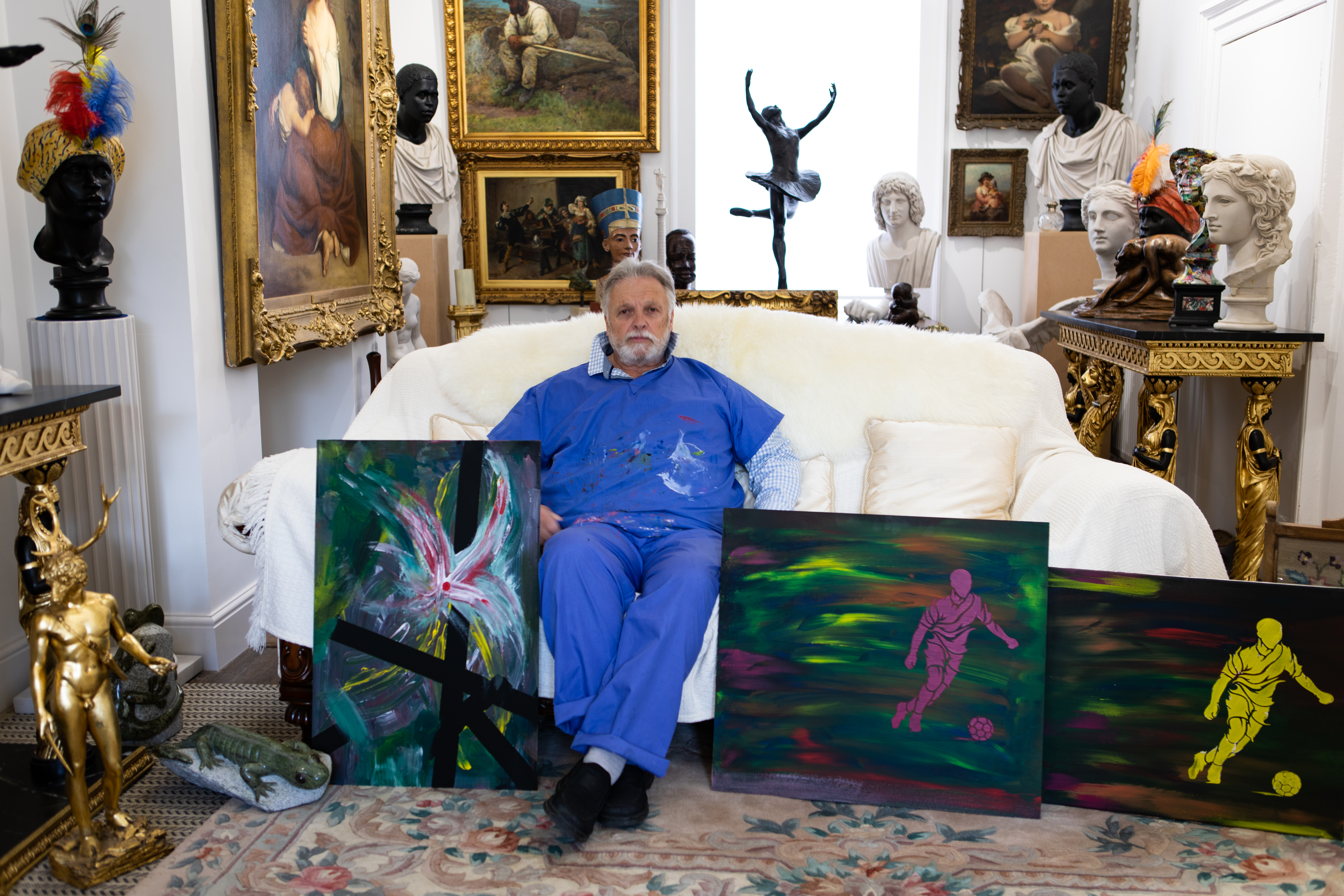
Knighton with some of his artwork in 2020

Knighton is now retired from football and currently spends his time painting, sculpting and writing poetry.

In 2008, Knighton exhibited some of his artworks, a mix of sculpture and painting, at King's College Chapel in Cambridge. The work consisted of three contrasting depictions of the crucifixion of Jesus Christ. At the time, Knighton used the pseudonym and near-anagram of his name "Kongthin Pearlmich", as he did not want to attach his past links with his football career. Some coverage of the exhibition appeared in The Daily Telegraph newspaper stating "Canterbury Cathedral offered Christ sculpture 'worth £70 million". However, the value of the sculpture was unable to be verified as experts at Sotheby's and Christie's stated they did not recognise the artist's name.

== Managerial statistics ==
Managerial record by team and tenure
Team	From	To	Record					Ref
Team	From	To	P	W	D	L	Win %	Ref
Carlisle United	11 September 1997	17 December 1998	68	19	12	37	27.9	
Total			68	19	12	37	27.9	—
