= List of minor Scottish Cup entrants (1873–1894) =

This is a list of association football clubs which entered the Scottish Cup between 1873 and 1894, when the Scottish Qualifying Cup was introduced, and which lack the prominence for their Wikipedia pages.

== 1st Dumfries Rifle Volunteers F.C. ==
1st D.R.V.
- Founded: 1881
- Dissolved: 1883
- Ground: Noblehill Park
- Hon. President: Lt.-Col. W. E. Malcolm
- Match Secretary: Pte Thomas Cairns
- Hon. Secretary: Sgt Major James Kennedy
Home colours

=== History ===
The club was founded on 10 December 1881, out of the 1st Dumfriesshire Rifle Volunteers, a company in the Volunteer movement of the British Army. The Volunteers included sporting activities within their purview and newspapers often carried reports of such activities. The growth of football in Scotland, especially thanks to Queen's Park F.C., and the success of army teams in England such as the Royal Engineers A.F.C., encouraged regiments to form football clubs as part of the physical regimen. The 1st D.R.V. was re-organized under the Royal Scots Fusiliers in July 1881 and the football side seems to have emerged as a result of a larger pool of players, with 50 from which to choose.

The club tried to join the Scottish Football Association in June 1882, but was turned down for not having a private ground. It was finally admitted two months later, in time to enter the 1882–83 Scottish Cup. It had a lucky draw in the first round, as scheduled opponents Dumfries Academicals scratched. In the second, it was drawn to play one of the two strongest sides in the region, Queen of the South Wanderers, at Nunholm, and was 3–2 up at half-time, but lost 5–3.

The club did not enter the Churchill Cup for local sides, and seems to have given up the game, not renewing its Scottish FA membership at the end of the season. The Volunteer movement was already catered for by the 5th K.R.V. which had attracted a much greater membership – notably the 5th K.R.V.'s second XI had beaten the 1st D.R.V.'s first XI 5–1 in November 1882.

=== Colours ===
The club's colours were black and yellow.

=== Ground ===
The club played at Noblehill Park, near Dumfries.

== 10th Lanarkshire Rifle Volunteers F.C. ==
10th L.R.V.
- Founded: 1884
- Dissolved: 1885
- Ground: Braehead Park
- Secretary: Alexander Stewart
Home colours

=== History ===
The 10th L.R.V. was a volunteer regiment football club, based in south-west Glasgow. It was founded in 1884, after most of the volunteer sides in Glasgow had ceased playing senior football. The 10th was formed out of the Glasgow Highlanders, which had been founded in 1868. The regiment had briefly played football when called the 105th Lanarkshire Rifle Volunteers in the mid-1870s.

The club optimistically joined the Scottish Football Association in 1885, but scratched from its Scottish Cup entry when drawn to face St Andrew's. Perhaps accepting it was out of its depth in a nearly-professional age, the club did not renew its Scottish FA membership; indeed there are no records that the club ever played senior football outside a military environment.

=== Colours ===
The club wore navy blue jerseys, 42nd tartan knickers, and red stockings.

=== Ground ===
The club played at Braehead Park on the Rutherglen Road, later the home of Thistle.

== Annfield F.C. ==
Annfield
- Dissolved: 1881

The Annfield club was drawn in the Glasgow section of the 1881–82 Scottish Cup against Eastern Athletic; the club had no prior history, and there is no record of it joining the Scottish Football Association, so its entry was surprising. The result of the tie is unclear, as the North British Daily Mail had two reports - one saying that Annfield had won 2–1 at home, the other that it had drawn 1–1 away - and the Glasgow Herald had that the tie was a draw, but at Annfield's ground.

Whatever the score was, the tie was due to be replayed, but the club dissolved before it could take place. An Annfield Thistle is recorded as playing in Glasgow in 1880, and this may be the same club.

== Ardrossan F.C. ==
Ardrossan
- Founded: 1874
- Dissolved: 1876
- Ground: Paisley Street
- Match Secretary: Robert M'Cubbin
- Captain: H. Barclay

=== History ===
The first match in the town was played in September 1870, and featured the Ardrossan Castle club demonstrating the sport at the head of Glasgow Street; on 24 September 1870, the Castle club beat the Ardrossan club 1–0, although it is not clear whether the match was under rugby or Association rules - the match featured touchdowns, which were part of the out-dated association set of laws which Queen's Park had been using. The match appears to have been a one-off, as the formal foundation of the club took place in September 1874, the first reported match being a defeat to Kilmarnock the following week. M'Auslane, who had played for the Castle in the 1870 match, was vice-captain for the Ardrossan, and Hughes, who had played for Ardrossan in the match, was also a member of the new club.

The club's correspondence address was care of Barclay & Son Shipyards, suggesting its members were shipbuilders.

It entered the Scottish Cup on two occasions, in 1875–76 and 1876–77, but withdrew from the competition both times before playing. Its final reported match was a win over the Kilbirnie in April 1876.

=== Ground ===
The club played at a ground between Glasgow Street and Paisley Street.

=== External links ===
- Ardrossan Football Clubs from 1870 onwards

== Blairadam F.C. ==
Blairadam
- Founded: 1882
- Dissolved: 1891
- Ground: Kelty
- Hon. Secretary: James Stewart
- Match Secretary: T. Hunter
- Captain: David Rennie
Home colours

=== History ===
The club was founded in Kelty, in Fifeshire, 1882 as Blairadam Swifts, taking its name from Blairadam House, and it was one of the founder members of the Fifeshire Football Association. It played in the Fife Cup for most seasons from the competition's start in 1882–83 to 1890–91, but never won a tie. It did reach the last 4 in the competition's first iteration, but only after the team to which it lost in the first round, St Leonard's, fielded ineligible players, and, rather than re-playing the tie, ceded it to Blairadam; with 8 entrants the club was automatically advanced to the semi-final.

The club dropped the Swifts epithet in 1883, and the club's official name became simply Blairadam, but it was sometimes stylized as Blair Adam. Blairadam was admitted to the Scottish Football Association in August 1890 and it entered the 1890–91 Scottish Cup. It was drawn away to Bo'ness F.C. but scratched. It also scratched from the Fife Cup that year, when drawn to face Cowdenbeath, and appears to have been one of the 18 clubs struck from the roll in 1891.

=== Colours ===
The club's colours were navy and light blue.

=== Ground ===
The club's ground was never given with any greater precision than "Kelty". All traces had gone by the 1892 Ordnance Survey.

== Blairgowrie F.C. ==
Blairgowrie
- Founded: 1878
- Dissolved: 1882
- Ground: Games Park
- Match Secretary: Wm. MacDonald
Home colours

=== History ===
The Blairgowrie Football Club from Blairgowrie and Rattray was formed on 2 December 1878, in the aftermath of a friendly played in the town by Coupar Angus and Alyth. In 1880 the club suffered a blow when captain Christie broke his collarbone in training.

After playing five matches in its second season - with a record of 2 wins, 1 draw, 2 defeats, scoring 4 goals and conceding 9 - it joined the Scottish Football Association in 1881. The club played one tie in the Scottish Cup, a 4–0 defeat to Coupar Angus in the first round in 1881–82. The final recorded game for the club was a 5–0 defeat at neighbours Rattray in February 1882, considered more "a series of tripping and foul charging", and the club was removed from the Scottish FA membership roll in 1882.

=== Colours ===
The club wore navy and white 1" hooped jerseys and hose, with white knickers, and anachronistcally included a navy and white striped cap.

=== Ground ===
The club's ground was Games Park, adjoining Blairgowrie House, at the west end of Blairgowrie, about half a mile from Blairgowrie railway station, thanks to the generosity of Mr Macpherson of Blairgowrie.

== Blairvaddick F.C. ==
Blairvaddick
- Founded: 1886
- Dissolved: 1887
- Ground: Ibrox

=== History ===
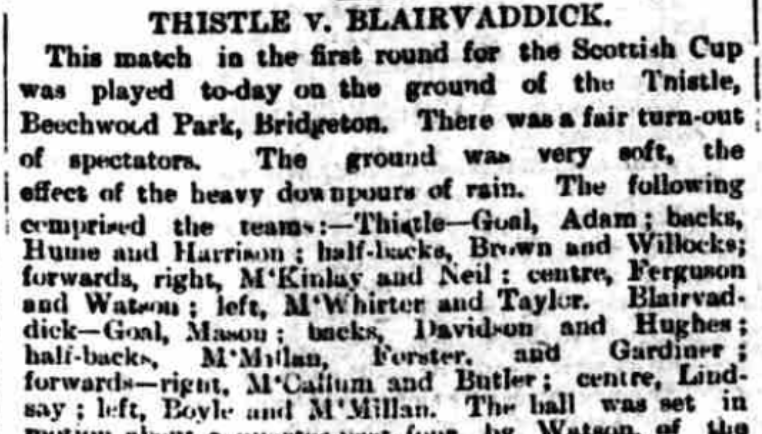
1886–87 Scottish Cup 1st Round, Thistle 13–0 Blairvaddick, line-ups, Glasgow Evening News, 11 September 1886

Blairvaddick F.C. was a short-lived association football club from Govan, in Glasgow. It was admitted as a member of the Scottish Football Association in 1886. The club appears to have been the footballing section of a cricket club

The club's first match was a 5–0 defeat to Rutherglen on 4 September 1886, four of the goals coming in the last 15 minutes, A week later the club played in the Scottish Cup at Thistle, and was hammered 13–0; the score was only 1–0 in the 43rd minute and 2–0 at half-time.

The club's friendly matches included a home defeat to a 9-man Dykebar and a 9–2 loss to the Hamilton Academical second XI, shortly after which the club was the victim of a burglary after one Donald M'Millan, on two days, stole a football, three guernseys, a pair of boots, three hair-combs, and 48 pieces for a draughts board, for which he was sentenced to 3 months in prison. Blairvaddick finally picked up a win over Clydesdale in November, by 1 goal to 0.

Blairvaddick at least finished the season on something of a high; although it lost to Govan Athletic in the Govan Charity Cup, it beat Yoker in the Govan Jubilee Cup, a trophy for which just those two clubs originally competed, The original match, at Summerton Athletic's Victoria Park, was a six-goal thriller which Yoker came from 2–0 down to 3–2 up, and Blairvaddick rescued the game with "a combined rush" just before time. The replay, at the same venue, was won for Blairvaddick thanks to a late winner from Hughes. However, the success was Blairvaddick's last match; it was struck from the Scottish FA membership in 1887, and it gave up on football, although continued with the cricket.

=== Ground ===
The club played at Ibrox.

== Bridgend Athletic F.C. ==
Bridgend Athletic
- Nicknames: the Bridgenders, the Athletics
- Founded: 1885
- Dissolved: 1889
- Ground: Recreation Ground
- Match Secretary: William Miller
- Hon. Secretary: William Douglas
Home colours	Change colours

=== History ===
The earliest match recorded for the Perth club is in March 1885, against the Perth Swifts. At the end of the month, the club resolved to join the Perthshire Association for the following season; its first appearance in the Perthshire Cup, in 1885–86, ended in a 10–1 defeat in the first round to the Vale of Teith.

The club entered the county cup until 1888–89, although the club never won a tie; its only "success" coming in its final entry, when Guildtown Wanderers scratched to it in the first round.

The club joined the Scottish Football Association in August 1888, its name styled as Bridge-End Athletic (Perth). This entitled the club to enter the 1888–89 Scottish Cup, but it lost in the first round 6–1 at home to Coupar Angus, the Athletics scoring its goal in the first half, but conceding three in each.

Its run as a senior club was brief - in 1889 the club was struck from the Scottish FA register and the club gave up football owing to "want of support".

=== Colours ===
The club originally registered alternate sets of colours with the Scottish FA - maroon or white. In 1889 it registered a combination of the two.

=== Ground ===
It played at the Bridgend Recreation Ground.

== Burnside (Partick) F.C. ==
Burnside (Partick)
- Founded: 1878
- Dissolved: 1879
- Ground: Clarendon Park
- Hon. Secretary: F. Mackay
Home colours

=== History ===
Burnside (Partick) F.C. was formed in Partick, Glasgow, in 1878, out of a cricket club. It entered the 1878–79 Scottish Cup and was the lucky club in the Glasgow section to receive a bye into the second round, where it was drawn to visit Alexandra Athletic; the A.A.C. won 3–0, Burnside not even managing a shot.

The club does not seem to have played another senior match; drawn to face Ailsa in the 1879–80 Scottish Cup, the Scottish FA recorded that the club had dissolved. There was one more recorded match for a Burnside (Partick) club, being a defeat at Moffat in January 1881, although this probably refers to a separate club. The club was not related to a club from Paisley of the same name which existed in the 1880s.

=== Colours ===
The club wore royal blue and scarlet jerseys, blue serge knickers, and stockings of any colour.

=== Ground ===
The club's home was Clarendon Park, opposite the Gas Works tram station.

== Caledonia F.C. (Greenock) ==
Caledonia
- Founded: 1880
- Dissolved: 1884
- Ground: Wellington Park
- Chairman: Mr J. Orr
- Hon. Secretary: Neil Galbraith
- Match Secretary: Donald Crawford
Home colours

=== History ===
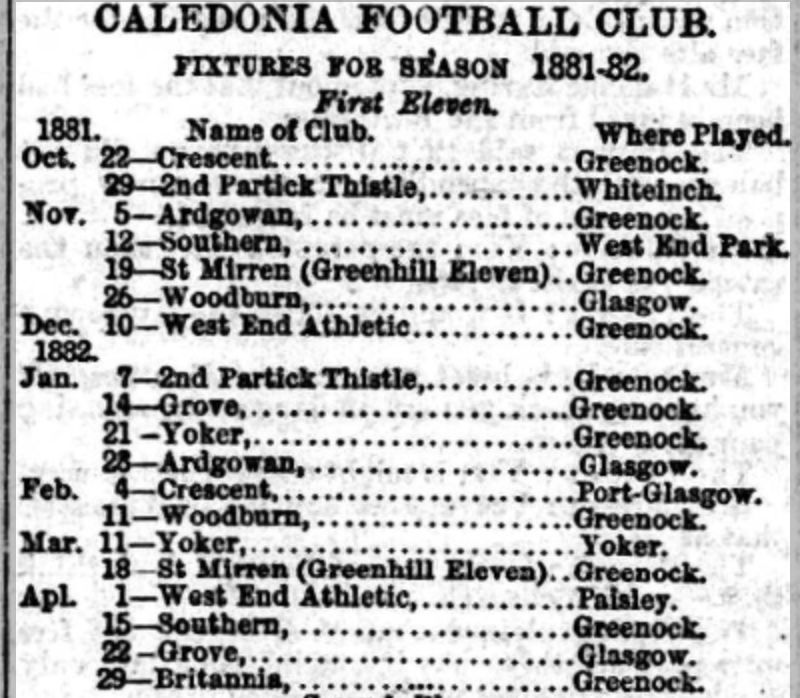
1881–82 Caledonia Football Club fixtures, Greenock Telegraph, 11 October 1881

The short-lived Renfrewshire club was founded in 1880. It joined the Scottish Football Association in August 1883 and entered the 1883–84 Scottish Cup; given the club had only played 10 matches in 1882–83, winning only four, this was an ambitious move.

Caledonia had a friendly relationship with the Paisley side West-End, providing it with 5 of its players for a second XI fixture in November 1881.

In the first round it lost 6–0 at St Mirren. The next month, Caledonia lost 4–0 at Northern (Greenock) in its only Renfrewshire Cup tie.

Caledonia was plainly out of its depth, with only 35 members making it the smallest side in the county, and having St Mirren, Northern, and Southern as bigger sides in Greenock itself. After one season as a senior club, Caledonia did not renew its subscription to the Scottish FA, and did not play again.

=== Colours ===
The club played in all white.

=== Ground ===
The club played at Wellington Park, formerly the home ground of a club of the same name, and later the home of Greenock Rangers.

== Cambridge F.C. ==
Cambridge
- Founded: 1885?
- Dissolved: 1886
- Ground: Moray Park

Although there is no evidence as to when the club was admitted to the Scottish Football Association, or indeed that it played more than a couple of matches before the 1885–86 season, the club entered the 1885–86 Scottish Cup. It beat Southern Athletic 2–1 in the first round of the competition, having to play the tie twice after Athletics protested about the non-registration of several players. The club played St Andrew's in the second round, at Moray Park, but lost 6–0.

There was only one other match for the club which gained any major attention, against Tollcross, and that was to announce the match had been called off. The club's final recorded match was a 12–0 defeat at the Thistle 2nd XI in the Glasgow North Eastern Cup in January 1886. The club was struck from the Scottish FA membership roll in August 1886.

== Cartha A.C. ==
Cartha
- Nickname: the Athletic
- Founded: 1890
- Dissolved: 1891
- Ground: Pollok Park
- Hon. Secretary: William Allan
- Match Secretary: James Kirkland
Home colours

=== History ===
The Cartha club from the Pollok area of Glasgow was founded in 1890 out of a cricket club which was based in Pollok Park. The club's secretary, James Kirkland, had previously held the role at Southern Athletic, so may have been recruited for the role in order to ensure fixtures for the new club. The club was properly the Cartha Athletic Club, and was often referred to as Cartha Athletic, but the registered football name was Cartha.

The club's flirtation with football was a short one. It ambitiously joined the Scottish Football Association in August 1890, but scratched from its 1890–91 Scottish Cup tie with Carfin Shamrock. Despite a startling 7–1 win at the United Abstainers in November 1890, the club does not appear to have played football at all in 1891.

=== Colours ===
The club wore white jerseys with a maroon sash, and "dark" knickers (probably navy serge, which was available at 2/6 per pair).

=== Ground ===
The club played at Pollok Park, which had previously been used by, among others, Pollokshields Athletic.

== Catrine Thistle F.C. ==
Catrine Thistle
- Nickname: the Thistle
- Founded: 1890
- Dissolved: 1892
- Ground: Alexandria Park
- Match Secretary: D. J. Manson
Home colours

=== History ===
The Thistle was from the town of Catrine, Ayrshire; an earlier club of the same name played in the 1880–81 season, but this particular club is first recorded in 1890. By May 1891 the club had won 28 of its 36 matches and in August 1891 it joined the Scottish Football Association.

Catrine only played three competitive matches as a senior club. Its 1891–92 Scottish Cup first preliminary round tie at Dalry was abortive as the official referee did not turn up, so the clubs played out a friendly, which the Thistle won 4–3. Dalry had evidently learnt its lesson because when the tie was properly played off, it won 5–0. The other two matches were against Stewarton Cunninghame in the Ayrshire Cup; after a 4–4 draw, Stewarton won the replay 7–5. The club left the Scottish FA in August 1892.

The club played out the 1891–92 season, finishing with an 8–0 win against Kilmarnock Strollers, but after being struck from the Scottish FA roll in August, never seems to have played again.

=== Colours ===
The club played in dark blue jerseys and knickers.

=== Ground ===
The club's ground was Alexandria Park. The largest recorded crowd was 1,500, for a friendly with a Celtic reserve side.

== Cathcart Volunteers F.C. ==
Cathcart Volunteers
- Founded: 1893
- Dissolved: 1895
- Ground: Hazelwood Park
- Match Secretary: H. G. Hunter
Home colours

=== History ===
The Renfrewshire club was formed in 1893, shortly after the demise of Cathcart F.C., and played its first match against a Helensburgh side at home that March. The Volunteers enjoyed an 8–1 victory, with 8 different scorers; M'Culloch, J. Campbell, Gardiner, Brass, Harley, Gairey, R. Campbell, and an own goal.

The club joined the Scottish Football Association five months later and lost narrowly to Lanemark in the first preliminary round of the Scottish Cup, 4–3 in a replay; in the original tie, the Volunteers came from 3–1 down to draw 3–3 despite losing a man to injury. However in the Renfrewshire Cup the club lost 13–2 at Abercorn.

The club entered the Scottish Cup in 1894–95, but scratched when paired with a strong Hurlford side in the first preliminary round, and the club's last reported match was a 4–3 home defeat to a touring Bohemians F.C. in October 1894. At the end of the season it was struck from the membership roll.

=== Colours ===
The club wore maroon jerseys.

=== Ground ===
The club's ground was Hazelwood Park.

== Chryston F.C. ==
Chryston
- Founded: 1881
- Dissolved: 1886
- Ground: Millbrae Park
- Hon. Secretary: James Angus
- Match Secretary: Thomas M'Isaac
- Captain: Thomas Calder
Home colours

=== History ===
The club was from the village of Chryston in Lanarkshire. It was founded in 1881.

In August 1884, having won 16 of 22 matches the previous season, and with the club in a "highly prosperous condition", it joined the Scottish Football Association. It entered the 1884–85 Scottish Cup, but lost 8–1 at home to West Benhar.

The club's senior run only lasted one season, it not paying its subscription to the Scottish FA for 1885–86, although the club did play in the Lanarkshire Cup for the only time. In the first round, the club came close to pulling off a shock, holding Hamilton Academical to a 1–1 draw away from home, and tried unsuccessfully to claim the tie via protest. The replay - also held at South Street - saw the Acas re-assert their superiority, winning 11–1.

The final scheduled game known for the club was at Union in Dumbarton on Boxing Day 1885, although the name was later revived for Junior sides.

=== Colours ===
The club wore navy and red hooped jerseys and hose, and navy knickers.

=== Ground ===
The club's ground was Millbrae Park, a 10 minute walk from Garnkirk railway station.

== Coatbridge F.C. ==
Coatbridge
- Founded: 1885
- Dissolved: 1889
- Ground: Blair Lodge Park
- Match Secretary: James Ross
- Hon. Secretary: A. Brock
Home colours

=== History ===
Although an earlier Coatbridge F.C. had existed briefly in the mid-1870s, the earliest match recorded for this club is a win over the Waverley club by 2–0 in September 1885.

Despite bearing the name of the Lanarkshire town, the club kept a low profile, and did not even enter the Lanarkshire Cup. However, the Drumpellier club stopped playing football at the end of the 1887–88 season, and Coatbridge accepted the chance to take over its place as the third senior club in Coatbridge, for the start of the 1888–89 season.

The club therefore entered both the 1888–89 Scottish Cup and the Lanarkshire Cup for the first time. The club lost 5–0 at Cambuslang Hibs to such general indifference that even the Coatbridge Express did not mention the score, and the club did not turn up for its county cup first round tie at Carfin Shamrock. Unsurprisingly, given such apathy from and about the club, it ceased operations before the next season.

=== Colours ===
The club wore 1" black and white hoops.

=== Ground ===
The club played at Blair Lodge Park, replacing Drumpellier. After the club's end, the ground was taken over fully by Junior side Coatbridge Hibernians, who had been sharing the ground previously.

== Cyrus F.C. ==
Cyrus
- Founded: 1882
- Dissolved: 1885
- Ground: Cyrus Park
- Match Secretary: John Campbell
Home colours

=== History ===
The short-lived Glaswegian club claimed to have been founded in 1882. In 1884, after playing one match in the 1883–84 season (a 3–3 draw), it joined the Scottish Football Association, and entered the 1884–85 Scottish Cup. After a 7–0 defeat at Possilpark, no more is heard of the club until its removal from the Scottish FA register the next season.

=== Colours ===
The club wore dark blue jerseys and knickers.

=== Ground ===
The club played on a private ground at Cyrus Park, on the Cumbernauld Road, 3 minutes' walk from Alexandra Park railway station. The ground was probably part of Alexandra Park itself, or one of the two open areas between the park and the Cumbernauld Road.

== Dumfries Academicals F.C. ==
Dumfries Academicals
- Founded: 1881
- Dissolved: 1883
- Ground: Nunholm
- Hon. Secretary: David Wyper
- Match Secretary: J. M. Tennent
Home colours

=== History ===
Although a one-off rugby union match is recorded for a Dumfries Academicals side in 1879, the first match for a properly formed Dumfries Academicals club - also to rugby rules - was against the former pupils of Grosvenor College, Carlisle in October 1881. The Academicals side was made up mostly (but not exclusively) of former pupils of the Dumfries Academy. The only goal of the game was scored by Tennant, who was the secretary of the association side.

The Academicals hosted an association match at Nunholm between Queen's Park and a Dumfries select in February 1882, and, perhaps seeing the success of this (the crowd was estimated at 2,000), joined the Scottish Football Association in June 1882. Its only appearance of note was in the draw for the 1882–83 Scottish Cup, withdrawing when paired with fellow new members the 1st Dumfries Rifle Volunteers.

The club did play a handful of matches in 1882–83, including a creditale 7–4 defeat to the 5th K.R.V. in March, but left the Scottish FA at the end of the season.

=== Colours ===
The club played in dark blue.

=== Ground ===
The club's ground, Nunholm, would be used by Queen of the South Wanderers from 1883.

== Dumfries Harp F.C. ==
Dumfries Harp
- Founded: 1889
- Dissolved: 1890
- Ground: Mildamhead
- Hon. Secretary: Michael M'Gill
- Match Secretary: James King
Home colours

=== History ===
The first references to the club are from August 1889, when the new club took part in a five-a-side football contest at the Dumfries recreation grounds. The new club ambitiously joined the Scottish Football Association the same month and entered the 1889–90 Scottish Cup.

The club drew a bye in the first round, but faced Queen of the South Wanderers in the second round at the latter's Cresswell Park. The match was considered a foregone conclusion, as the Wanderers' junior side had beaten the Harp 6–3 in September. However, the Harp, with the wind and sun behind them, took a surprise early lead, and the score was still 1–1 at half-time. The Wanderers' superior experience told, but only towards the end of the game, when it ran up late goals for a flattering 5–1 win.

The only other competitive match the club played was in the Churchill Cup for southern counties sides in November, a 7–1 defeat against Dumfries, with left-wing M'Kinnon scoring the Harp goal when two down. The club was invited to take part in the Southern Counties Charity Cup, but its 12–1 defeat at the 5th K.R.V., to "very little interest", and two of the Harp only turning up 20 minutes into the game, seems to have been so crushing as to finish the club. It was duly struck from the SFA register in 1890.

=== Colours ===
The club wore green jerseys and white knickers.

=== Ground ===
The club played at Mildamhead, also the ground of Dumfries.

== Dunach F.C. ==
Dunach
- Founded: 1889
- Dissolved: 1894
- Ground: Kilmore
- Secretary: Peter Fletcher
Home colours

=== History ===
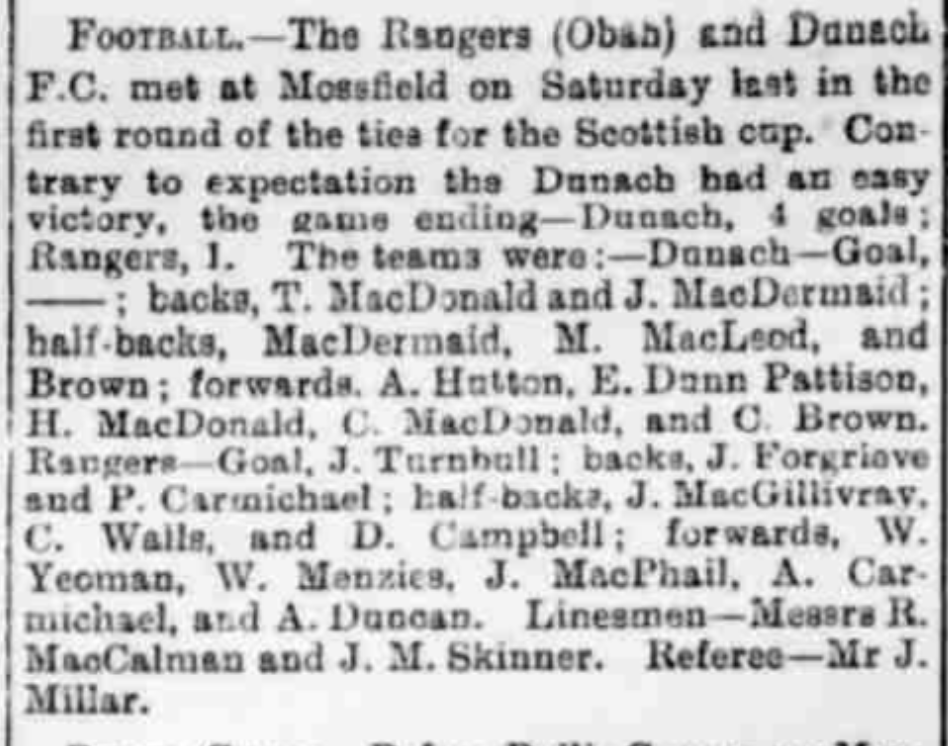
1893–94 Scottish Cup 1st preliminary round, Oban Rangers 1–4 Dunach, Oban Times, 6 September 1893

The club, from Oban in Argyllshire, took its name from a nearby clan estate. The first reference is of a home match with the Oban F.C. second XI in January 1889; despite Oban bolstering its side with three first-teamers, and F. Edmondson and C. N. MacDonald of the home side only being 14, the game ended 1–0 to Dunach.

Dunach made the ambitious decision to join the Scottish Football Association in 1893, and won its first qualifying round match in the 1893–94 Scottish Cup 4–1 at Oban Rangers. In the second round, the club lost 3–1 to Inveraray, the match being played at the Rangers' Mossfield Park. The score was 1–1 at half-time, but Inveraray scored a freak crucial second goal, when a parry from goalkeeper Smith hit the shoulder of half-back MacDiarmid and ricocheted back through the goal.

At the end of the season, the club was struck off the Scottish FA roll, along with neighbours Oban Rangers and the 1st Argyll Rifle Volunteers, the difficulties in keeping up senior football with few fixtures in a remote area proving too great.

=== Colours ===
The club wore red shirts and white knickers.

=== Ground ===
The club's first ground was at Glenfeochan. As a senior club, its ground was Kilmore, near Oban.

== Dunkeld F.C. ==
Dunkeld
- Founded: 1879
- Dissolved: 1881
- Ground: Inver Road
- Match Secretary: David Meek Boath, Thomas Christie
Home colours

=== History ===
The club was formed in Dunkeld in 1879, and by 1880 was the biggest club in Perthshire, with 50 members. Its first recorded match was a draw against the Killin club of Weem.

In 1880–81 the club played 7 matches, with 5 wins, 1 draw, and 1 defeat. The defeat was in the second round of the 1880–81 Scottish Cup, the club having been overlooked in the draw for the first round, so allowed to take part from the second, where Dunkeld lost 4–0 at home to Rob Roy of Callander; indeed those goals were the only ones the club conceded all season. The clubs were drawn together in the first round in the 1881–82 Scottish Cup, but Dunkeld scratched. The issue may have been the availability of players; four of its first-choice members could not play in a friendly against Perseverance of Blairgowrie and Rattray in November 1881 (although the club scored the only goal), and that seems to have been the club's final match.

=== Colours ===
The club wore 1" hooped navy blue and white jerseys and hose, and, originally, blue and white caps and white trousers, with a black and yellow badge.

=== Ground ===
The Duchess Dowager of Athole allowed the club to use a park on Inver Road, half-a-mile from Dunkeld railway station, known as Little Dunkeld.

== Dunmore F.C. ==
Dunmore
- Founded: 1876
- Dissolved: 1877
- Ground: Magdalen Green
- Hon. Secretary: T. B. Cuthbert
- Captain: J. Gorthy

=== History ===
The club was founded in 1876, as the second club in Dundee, the year after St Clement's.

The club's earliest reported match was a 5–0 win over the new Strathmore side, although it was still behind St Clement's, losing 2–1 in April 1877 and to the same club in its one Scottish Cup appearance, in the second round in 1877–78, with Dunmore having to recruit players from elsewhere in the district to form a side.

The Dunmore appears to have been taken over by St Clement's after that match, as there are no further Dunmore matches recorded. St Clement's had gradually been attracting players from Dunmore; Robertson had swapped sides before the April 1877 fixture, and Gourlay and Swan before the Scottish Cup tie, with J. M'Lennan joining St Clement's soon afterwards, and them joining Lawson at Our Boys in 1878.

=== Ground ===
In common with many of the early clubs in the town, Dunmore played at Magdalen Green.

== Duntocher F.C. ==
Duntocher
- Founded: 1886
- Dissolved: 1887
- Ground: Clydebank

The short-lived Clydebank club made next to no impact on the game. It only lasted one season, joining the Scottish Football Association in 1886 and leaving it in 1887.

The club had only two matches of note. In the first round of the 1886–87 Scottish Cup, when, with the club 8–0 down to Dumbarton Athletic, and the rain teeming down, the Duntocher players walked off and abandoned the game. It reached the third round of the 1886–87 Dunbartonshire Cup, thanks to a bye and second round opponents Dumbarton Hibernians not turning up to the club's Clydebank ground, so Duntocher kicked off and claimed the tie. There had been some confusion over the venue as the Hibernians had choice of ground, but could not host it themselves, because their ground was not private. In the third round, the club was easily beaten 3–0 at Union, all three goals coming in a brief first-half burst.

== Eastern F.C. (1884) ==
Eastern
- Founded: 1884?
- Dissolved: 1886
- Ground: Springfield Park
- Match Secretary: John Robson/Robertson
Home colours

=== History ===
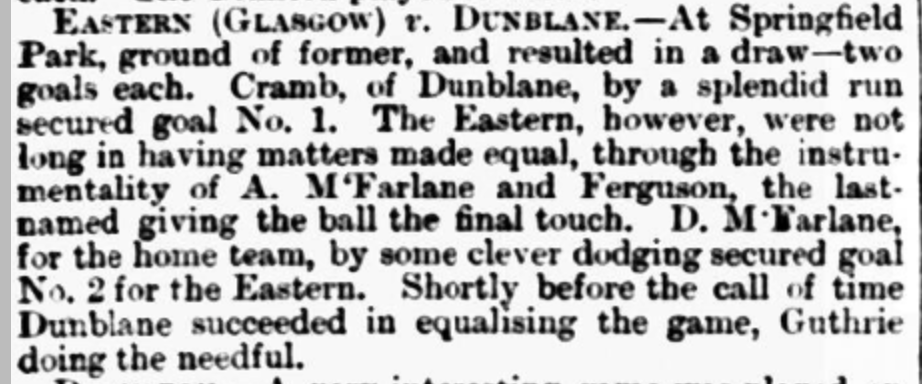
1884–85 friendly, Eastern (Glasgow) v Dunblane, Stirling Observer, 27 November 1884

The Glasgow club was said to have formed in 1875, but the first recorded match for the club is a 4–0 defeat to Orchard in 1879, and there is then a gap until November 1884, when it played Dunblane at home. Confusingly, the club emerged at the same time as two revivals of the Eastern Athletic name, in the same area of north-eastern Glasgow.

In January 1885, the club entered the North-Eastern Cup (alongside Eastern Athletic), In the first round it beat Tollcross 5–2, but lost narrowly to the well-established Northern 1–0 in the second.

The club joined the Scottish FA in February 1885, unusually being admitted mid-season. It entered the 1885–86 Scottish Cup, but scratched after being drawn at G.U.Y.M.C.A.A.C.

Eastern played regular friendlies through the year, and, with a membership of 50, had enough members to play three XIs.

Eastern was noted as having been removed from the membership list in 1886, this time there being no reference to Athletic, suggesting both clubs had left at the same time. The name was used in 1886 by a junior club.

=== Colours ===
The club wore navy jerseys with white knickers.

=== Ground ===
The club played at Springfield Park in Dalmarnock Road.

== Eastern Athletic F.C. (1879) ==
Eastern Athletic (1)
- Founded: 1879
- Dissolved: 1882
- Ground: Carntyne Park
- President: J. G. Hendry
- Match Secretary: J. C. Millar, Thos Cameron
- Hon. Secretary: Colin MacFarlane
Home colours

=== History ===
The club from the Parkhead area of Glasgow was founded in February 1879; the club's captain was one A. M'Gregor. Its earliest recorded match was a 2–0 win over the Strathclyde club at the start of the 1879–80 season.

The club was an entrant to the first Royal Standard and Grand National Hall competition in 1879–80, for clubs in the Gorbals area of Glasgow. However the club's one tie in the competition was a disastrous 11–0 defeat to Oxford.

Despite having a weak record as a junior club, having obtained the use of a private ground, it joined the Scottish Football Association in 1881. Its 36 members meant it was almost the smallest senior club in Glasgow; only Battlefield was smaller, and then only by one member. The club had a single season of senior football, being struck from the roll in 1882.

Its one entry to the Scottish Cup, in 1881–82, saw it walk over the Annfield club - after a match which is reported as ending in a draw or an Annfield win, but a replay being ordered - in the first round, and withdraw when faced with South Western in the second.

=== Colours ===
The club wore navy shirts, white knickers, and blue stockings.

=== Ground ===
The club moved to a new ground at Lower Carntyne Park in September 1880, the first match being a game against Albany that ended 2–2, one of the Albany goals being disputed. currently the site of the ground of Glasgow United.

== Eastern Athletic F.C. (1884) ==
Eastern Athletic (2)
- Nickname: Athletic
- Founded: 1884
- Dissolved: 1886
- Ground: Carntyne/Dalmarnock Park
- Match Secretary: Robert Connell, Alex. Cuthbert
1884–85 colours	1885–86 colours

=== History ===
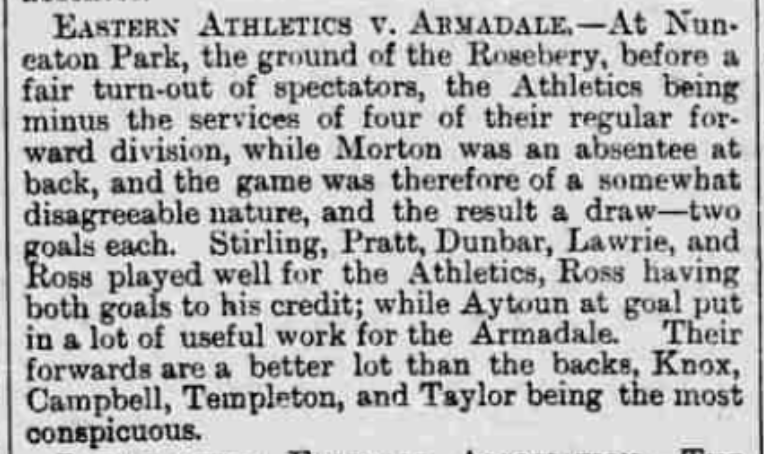
Friendly match, Eastern Athletic 2–2 Armadale, Rutherglen Reformer, 20 March 1885

The club was founded in 1884, with 42 members, confusingly at the same time as the foundation of Eastern F.C., in the same area of north-east Glasgow. Its first secretary, Robert Connell, was the former secretary of Pollokshields Athletic.

Eastern Athletic was admitted to the Scottish Football Association in 1884. It entered the 1884–85 Scottish Cup, but lost 9–1 to Partick in the first round, 7 goals coming in the second half. The result came hot on the heels of an 11–0 defeat to Whitefield of Govan.

The club entered the North-Eastern Association in January 1885, at the same time as Eastern. Its one tie in the competition ended with a 2–0 to Springburn Hibernian in a second replay. The club was at least prominent enough to host Rangers at its new Dalmarnock ground at the end of the 1884–85 season, and had played 31 matches, albeit only winning 10. However, towards the end of the season, the club was finding it difficult to field its first XI and in 1885–86 it only played friendly matches.

Eastern Athletic is shown as joining but not leaving the Scottish FA; the Eastern club left in 1886. The similarity of geography and name of the two sides perhaps indicates that Athletic left at the same time. Certainly Eastern Athletic was playing senior football as late as April 1886, but there is no record of it doing so afterwards, and at least two of its players (Stirling and Lawrie) are recorded as playing for Shettleston in 1886–87. A one-off record of a junior side in December 1886 is probably not the same club.

=== Colours ===
The club wore slightly different colours in its two seasons - in 1884–85, navy and white jerseys and hose, with navy trousers, and in 1885–86, changed the hoops to black.

=== Ground ===
In 1884–85, the club played at the same Carntyne Park as the previous Eastern Athletic club. In 1885–86, the club moved a ground it called Dalmarnock Park, but which was actually Beechwood Park, home of Thistle.

=== Notable player ===
- Phil Clark, who joined the club from Orchard, and who later played for Hibernian

== Fort William F.C. (1883) ==
Fort William
- Founded: 1883
- Dissolved: 1913
- Ground: Victoria Park
- Hon. President: Ewen Cameron
- Match secretary: D. M'Gillivray, James A. Wilson
- Captain: Alexander Jamieson
colours

=== History ===
The first reference to a football match in Fort William, Invernessshire, was a match between "Shopkeepers" and "Scribes" in January 1880. The Fort William club however was formed in summer 1883 by young lads who wanted "to promote a healthy and manly amusement for themselves", and the earliest reference to a match is a defeat in May 1884 to a scratch team of Mr C. Young.

The remoteness of the town meant it was difficult to find matches and the club was refused entry to the Inverness Charity Cup in 1887; when the club played a friendly at Inverness Caledonian in April 1891, the club had to undertake a 12 hour steamer journey, and the match had to be cut short by 30 minutes so the club could catch the return steamer.

Nevertheless, the club entered the Scottish Cup in 1891–92 and 1893–94, but to no avail, as it did not play a tie - a series of mutual scratchings following. The club continued its activities on a low-key level until at least 1913, playing over the summer rather than a traditional winter season, but it does not seem to have re-emerged after the First World War.

=== Colour ===
The club originally wore red and white jerseys and hose, and blue knickers. In 1893 it changed its shirts to white.

=== Ground ===
The club first played on land near the market stance given to the club by Mr D. P. McDonald; the club had previously practised on fields near Glen Nevis. By 1887 it was playing at Victoria Park, provided by Mrs Cameron Campbell of Monzie, who even paid for the fences.

== Fraserburgh Wanderers F.C. ==
Fraserburgh Wanderers
- Nickname: the Wanderers
- Founded: 1890
- Dissolved: 1905
- Ground: Bellslea Park
- President: William Mackie
- Secretary: Robert Guthrie
colours

=== History ===
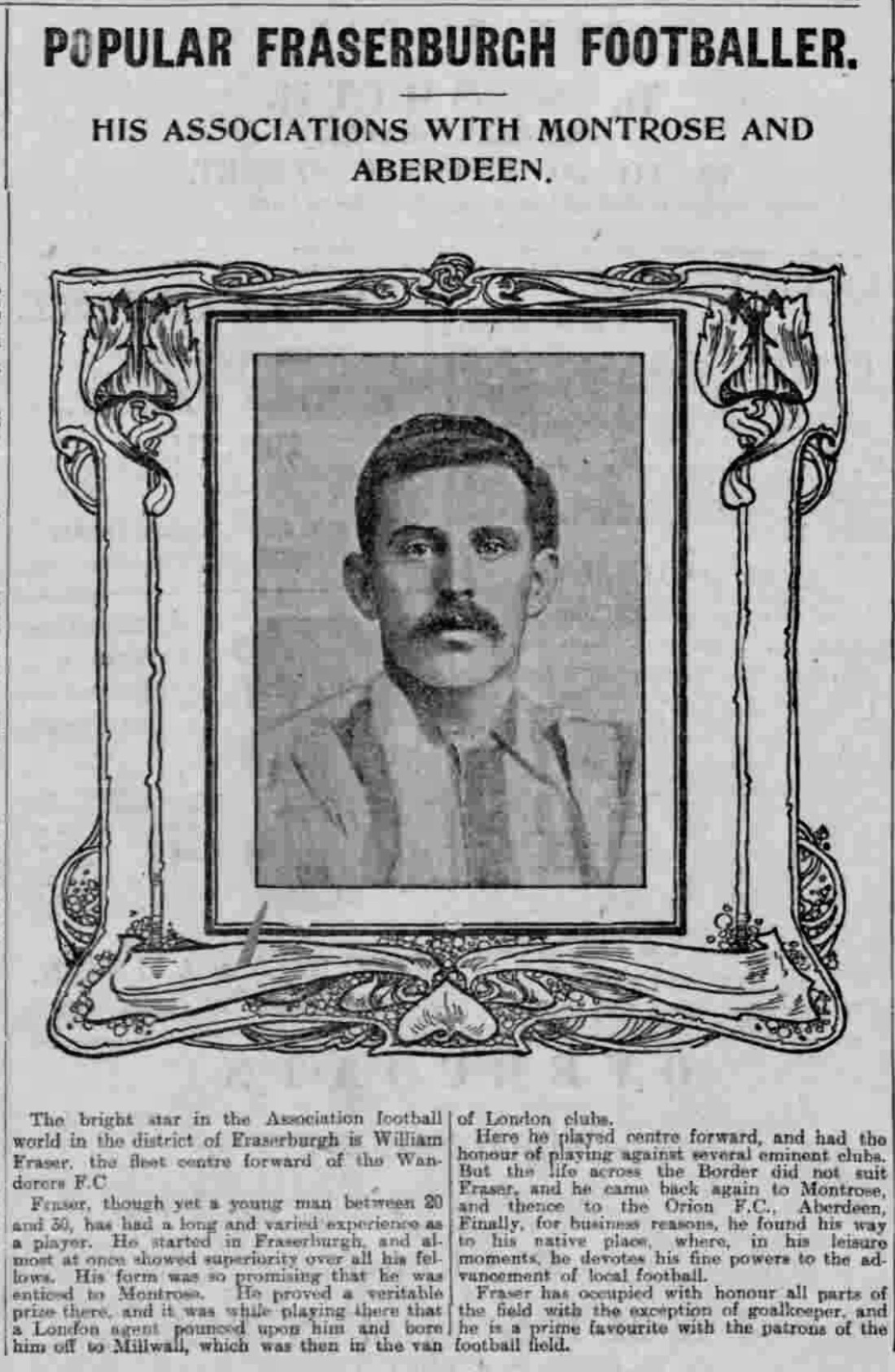
Wanderers' William Fraser, Football Post, 24 September 1904

The club was formed in October 1890 under the name Buchan Wanderers, made up of "some of the best players of two leading clubs" (one of which was Faithlie Thistle), William Burnett being appiinted as captain and Alex Byth as vice-captain. The club's first match was against fellow Fraserburgh side Hawthorn, which ended contentiously as the Wanderers walked off when the referee refused to allow what would have been an equalizing goal.

Over the next couple of years, the club was variously referred to as Buchan Wanderers, Wanderers, or Fraserburgh Wanderers, the last reference to the Buchan name in the form of "Fraserburgh Buchan Wanderers" in October 1892, and Fraserburgh Wanderers was the name under which the club registered itself with the Scottish Football Association in 1893.

The Fraserburgh FA was set up in February 1890 and the club was a founder member. It won the Fraserburgh Cup for the first time in 1892–93, and every season from 1894–95 until 1903–04. The club also took part in the Aberdeenshire Cup from 1892–93 to 1904–05, but found the standard far higher, either losing by big margins every time it played, or scratching from its remaining entries.

Despite this dispiriting record at county level, the club entered the Scottish Cup in 1893–94, being drawn at Aberdeen in the first preliminary round. Aberdeen scored straight from the kick-off and, 6–0 up at half-time, were so dominant that Tom Smyth in goal swapped out with left-back Ritchie; this allowed William Noble to score the only Wanderers goal with a "soft shot". However Aberdeen scored five more without reply for an 11–1 victory.

Plainly outgunned, the Wanderers did not enter the competition again, and reverted to county and local football. Its long hold on the Fraserburgh Cup was ended in 1905 by Fraserburgh Thistle, who beat Wanderers 3–2 in the final, and the club disbanded afterwards, supposedly for one season, but it never re-emerged.

=== Colours ===
The club played in light blue.

=== Ground ===
The club originally played its matches on the Fraserburgh Links. It played its most important matches, such as Aberdeen Cup matches, on Bellslea Park, as did the Hawthorn side.

== Gladstonians F.C. ==
Gladstonians
- Nickname: the Glads
- Founded: 1889
- Dissolved: 1895
- Ground: Kingholm Park
- President: R. C. Hastings
- Match Secretary: George Hume
Home colours

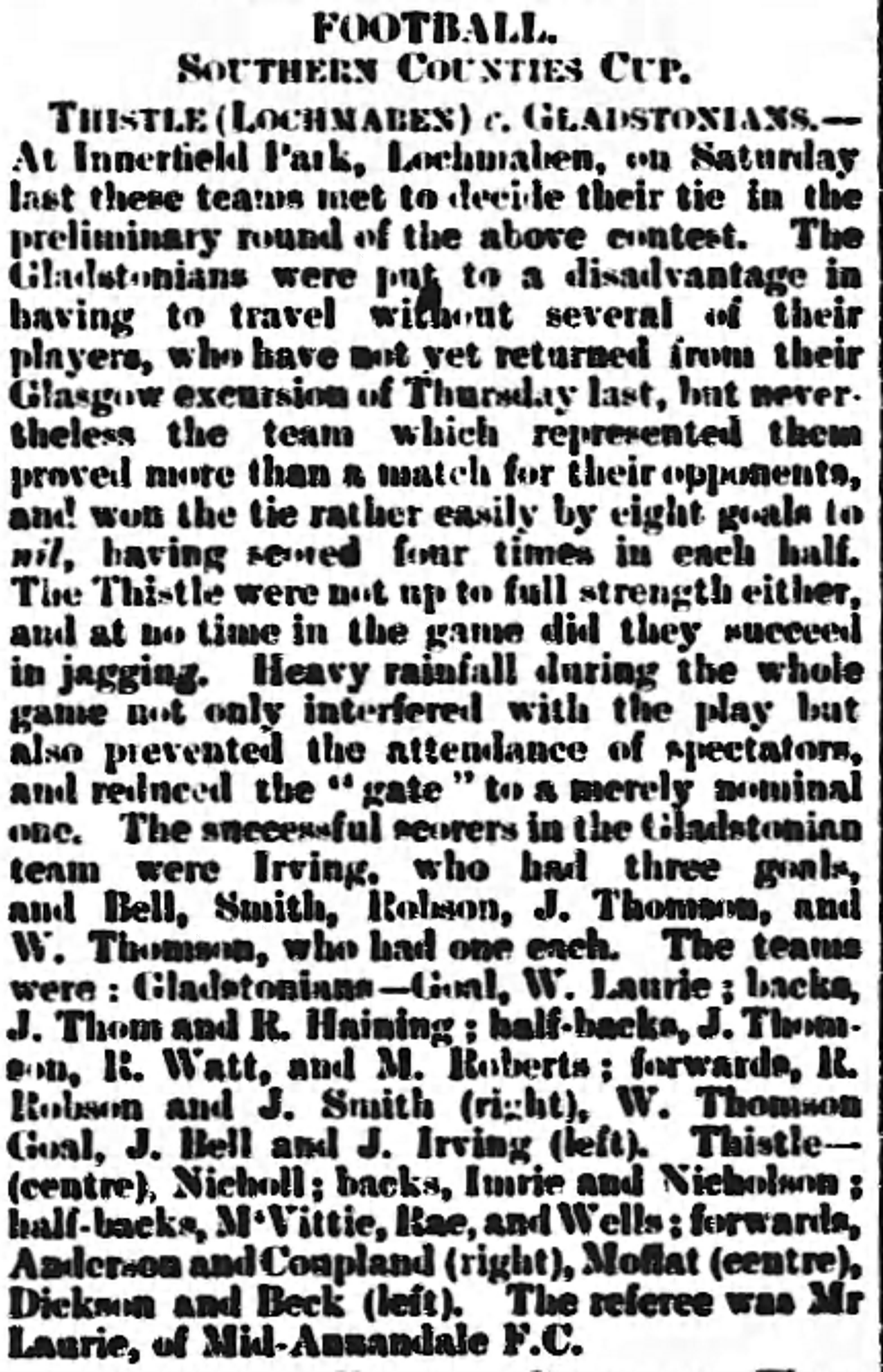
1892–93 Southern Counties Cup, Thistle (Lochmaben) 0–8 Gladstonians, Dumfries & Galloway Advertiser, 5 October 1892

=== History ===
The Dumfries club was founded in 1889, by adherents to Gladstonian liberalism. Its earliest recorded match is a 19–0 hammering by St John's in September, but recovered enough to beat the Dumfries Swifts 4–3 the next month, the game ending early as the Swifts walked off in protest at a refereeing decision.

The club made its debut in competitive football in the 1891–92 season, by entering the Southern Counties Cup and the Churchill Cup. However the club suffered heavy defeats in its first ties in both - 11–3 to St Cuthbert Wanderers in the former and 14–2 at Queen of the South Wanderers in the latter. The club did successfully protest its defeat against St Cuthbert on the basis that one of the Kirkcudbright club's players was wearing iron heelplates; even though the protest was considered "paltry" the Southern Counties FA considered it had no alternative given the regulations but to uphold it. However the replay never seems to have taken place, the Gladstonians withdrawing.

The club was the subject of some notoriety when one of its members, John William Brown, a painter of North Queensbury Street, was sentenced to three months' imprisonment after drunkenly assaulting a woman and stealing 4s from her.

The club however joined the Scottish Football Association in August 1892, despite not having a private ground of its own, which was normally a minimum requirement. This enabled the club to enter the preliminary rounds of the 1892–93 Scottish Cup, apparently without the knowledge of the club's members, so, when drawn to play Queen of the South Wanderers in its first tie, it scratched on arrival, and the clubs played out a friendly. As with the Churchill Cup tie the year before, the Wanderers won 14–2, Gladstonians playing the second half with ten men. It turned out to be the club's only entry in the competition, as it did not renew its Scottish FA membership at the end of the season.

Gladstonians did at least win a competitive match in the Southern Counties Cup that season, 8–0 at Rising Thistle, but the club was 6–1 down at Newton Stewart in the quarter-final when the tie was stopped for bad light; rather than replay the tie, the Glads scratched.

The club had not entered the Churchill Cup that season, and did not enter any senior-level competition again; it continued to play until at least the end of 1894, but seems to have disbanded by the start of the 1895–96 season.

The name was revived in 1896, when the Dumfries and Maxwelltown Junior Liberal Association resolved to form a new football club, adopting a familiar name.

=== Colours ===
The club wore pink jerseys.

=== Ground ===
The club played at the public Kingsholm Park.

== Glencairn F.C. (Edinburgh) ==
Glencairn
- Founded: 1880
- Dissolved: 1888
- Ground: Merchiston Park (North)
- Match Secretary: John Cundill
Home colours

=== History ===
The club was founded in 1880 and played low-level football until joining the Scottish Football Association in 1885.

As a senior club, it claimed a membership of 150, which, although well behind the Edinburgh behemoths of Heart of Midlothian and Hibernian, should have made it close to St Bernard's.

However the club's move to seniority may have cost it some of its following, as it was now a competitor to the other Edinburgh senior clubs, rather than a complement. The club did not renew its membership at the end of the 1885–86 season. Its only competitive matches as a senior club included a 6–2 defeat in the 1885–86 Scottish Cup to Norton Park - a club which had never won a Scottish Cup tie before - and a 3–1 defeat to the junior Vale of Midlothian in the first round of the Edinburgh Shield.

The club did continue after leaving the Scottish FA, entering the Edinburgh Shield until 1887–88 and entering the new King Cup twice, in 1886–87 and 1887–88.

=== Colours ===
The club wore black jerseys, white knickers, and black and white hose.

=== Ground ===
The club played at the north end of Merchiston Park, on Slateford Road, 10 minutes from Merchiston railway station.

== Glencairn F.C. (Glasgow) ==
Glencairn
- Founded: 1877
- Dissolved: 1884
- Ground: Strathclyde Park
- Hon. Secretary: Robert Lang
- Match Secretary: John Graham
Home colours

=== History ===
The east Glasgow club was formed in 1877, out of a cricket club. Its earliest recorded football fixture was a 5–0 win against the Saracen Youths on Glasgow Green in 1880.

After a record of 13 wins, 2 draws, and just 1 defeat in 1882–83, the club decided to turn senior in 1883. It lost 3–1 in the first round of the 1883–84 Scottish Cup to Granton.

The club had one season as a senior club, and seems to have dissolved after the season, although its matches were scarcely ever reported, so it may have continued on a low-key basis afterwards.

=== Colours ===
The club wore royal and navy blue striped jerseys, and white knickers.

=== Ground ===
The club started out at Glasgow Green. As a senior club Glencairn obtained the use of Strathclyde Park, on the east end of Dalmarnock Road, a minute from the tram terminus.

== Greenock Rovers F.C. ==
Greenock Rovers
- Founded: 1883
- Dissolved: 1885
- Ground: Bogston Park
- Secretary: James Cunningham
Home colours

=== History ===
Greenock Rovers was one of a number of clubs which emerged in Greenock, Renfrewshire, in the 1880s. It joined the Scottish Football Association in August 1884, at the same time as Rangers, and after other clubs such as Morton and Southern.

The club was therefore joining a saturated market, and, despite claiming a foundation date of 1883, there are no matches recorded from before May 1884. Its first match as a senior took place on 30 August 1884, and was an 11–0 hammering at home to Southern; a week later, as a practice match for its opponent, a Rovers XI took on a ten-man Morton, and lost 4–0.

Rovers would only ever play one competitive match, a 3–1 defeat at Clippens in the 1884–85 Scottish Cup. In the aftermath of the match there were rumours that Rovers had already disbanded. Rovers did last long enough to register a 2–1 revenge win over Clippens in October 1884, but at the end of the month it not turn up to Bogston Park for its first round Renfrewshire Cup tie with Northern (Greenock), and it fell off the Scottish FA register after only one season.

=== Colours ===
The club wore navy blue jerseys and knickers, and red hose.

=== Ground ===
The club's ground, Bogston Park, was shared with Northern and Lyle Athletic.

== Hamilton Hibernians F.C. ==
Hamilton Hibernians
- Nickname: the Hibs
- Founded: 1887
- Dissolved: 1888
- Ground: N. B. Park
- Hon. Secretary: John Duffy
- Match Secretary: J. McGeechan
Home colours

=== History ===
The Hamilton, Lanarkshire club was first recorded in June 1887 as an entrant to a four-a-side football tournament. Two months later the Hibernians joined the Scottish Football Association and entered the 1887–88 Scottish Cup. The club was drawn against fellow Irish-origin side Cambuslang Hibernians in the first round and lost 6–4. The two sides were again drawn together in the first round of the Lanarkshire Cup a month later, again at Cambuslang, and again Cambuslang won a high-scoring game, this time 9–3.

The club was active through the season, and started the 1888–89 season with a friendly against Hamilton West-End. The Hibs almost became the top club in Hamilton at the same time, as it appeared that Hamilton Academical was on the verge of dissolving, a meeting to confirm the decision being postponed because (ironically) of a lack of interest, with the Hibs poised to take over the Acas' ground and plant at South Haugh, but the Hibs turned down the chance to do so, and the Acas decided to continue.

The Hibs' failure to take over South Haugh was a fateful, and fatal, step. Before the season could get properly underway, Glasgow Hibernian took away Duffy, and the Acas took away M'Queen; by the end of August the Hibs were struck off the Scottish FA roll for non-payment of subscription, and the club disappeared. A new club, Hamilton Harp, started up in 1890 to represent the Hamilton Irish.

=== Colours ===
The club wore green jerseys and blue knickers.

=== Ground ===
The ground, called N. B. (North British) Park, was behind the North British Railway station, with an entrance off Windmill Road.

=== Notable player ===
One Hibernian player represented the Lanarkshire representative side - the half-back M'Queen, who featured against the Edinburgh side.

== Hawthorn F.C. ==
Hawthorn
- Nickname: the Haws
- Founded: 1888
- Dissolved: 1896
- Ground: the Links
- President: David Watt
- Secretary: Peter Buchan, John M'Kay
- Captain: William Sinclair, G. Cumming
colours

=== History ===
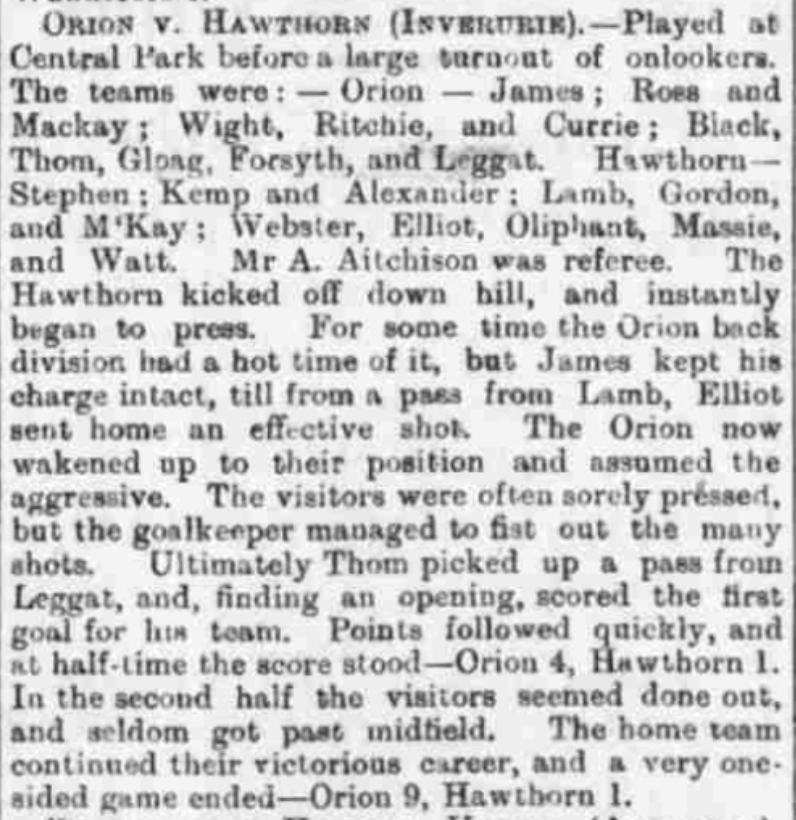
1893–94 Scottish Cup 1st preliminary round, Orion 9–1 Hawthorn (Fraserburgh), Aberdeen Press, 4 September 1893

The Hawthorn club was formed in Fraserburgh, Aberdeenshire, in October 1888. The club was made up primarily of tradesmen and shopkeepers. At the time, association football in the town was considered a distinct second to rugby, a rugby match at the start of 1889 being considered the "more important match" than the Hawthorn friendly on the same day.

The Fraserburgh FA was set up in February 1890 and the club was a founder member. It won the Fraserburgh Cup in its first instalment in 1889–90, and also took the trophy in 1891–92 and 1893–94.

In the latter season, the club played in the Scottish Cup for the only time, being drawn at Orion in the first preliminary round. Hawthorn put in special practice for the tie, and, kicking off with the slope, took an early lead. However the nettled Orion scored nine goals without further reply. The clubs met again in a friendly at the Links three weeks later; this time Orion won 9–2.

Hawthorn tried its luck in the Aberdeenshire Cup in 1894–95, beating Aberdeen University F.C. 6–4 at Bellslea Park in the first round, coming from 4–2 down, despite having a "somewhat scratchy team"; but scratched to Orion in the second.

The last recorded fixtures known for the club was a pair of ill-tempered 4–2 fixtures with Peterhead, the match at Bellslea leaving "two, or three, of the Hawthorn players incapacitated", and the return ending 7–2 to Peterhead. References to a Hawthorn club afterwards appear to refer to an Aberdeen side, and a new club using the Hawthorn name was formed in Fraserburgh in 1898.

=== Colours ===
The club played in white.

=== Ground ===
The club originally played its matches on the Fraserburgh Links. In 1894 it moved to Bellslea Park, sharing with Fraserburgh Wanderers.

== Holytown F.C. ==
Holytown
- Nickname: the Holytonians
- Founded: 1879
- Dissolved: 1883
- Ground: Townhead Park
- Match Secretary: John Coffey, Hugh Miller
- Captain: P. S. Carmichael
Home colours

=== History ===
The club was formed in Holytown, Lanarkshire, in 1879. It was considered the winners of "the championship of the district" after a win over New Stevenston Rangers in August 1881 and in the following months entered the 1881–82 Lanarkshire Cup, debuting in the competition with a startling 7–0 win over Mosside. The club lost 5–1 in the second at Airdrie.

After winning 8 of 15 matches in 1881–82, the club joined the Scottish Football Association for the 1882–83 season and entered the Scottish Cup. The club was drawn at home to fellow new boys Wishaw, and Wishaw won 2–0; Holytown's protest about rough play was not considered, although the Scottish FA warned Wishaw "to be more careful in the future" and returned the 10/- deposit to Holytown.

The club lasted to the start of the 1883–84 season, entering a four-a-side tournament in August 1883 hosted by Hamilton Academical, although it did not renew its subscription to the Scottish FA, and seems to have disbanded soon afterwards.

=== Colours ===
The club wore white jerseys and blue knickers.

=== Ground ===
The club's first ground was Thankerton Park. On turning senior, it moved to Townhead Park, 15 minutes' walk from Holytown railway station.

== Ingram F.C. ==
Ingram
- Founded: 1876
- Dissolved: 1881
- Ground: Argyle Park
- Secretary: Joseph Adams
Home colours

=== History ===
The Govan club claimed a foundation date of 1876, with its earliest reported matches coming from the 1877–78 season, and, although never particularly active (it only played 10 matches in 1879–80), in 1880 joined the Scottish Football Association. Its one tie in the Scottish Cup, at South Western in September 1880, was a 7–0 defeat, Ingram conceding the first goal after 2 minutes, although Ingram's passing game was praised for its neatness.

The club entered the 1881–82 Scottish Cup and was drawn to play Athole, but both clubs had dissolved before the tie could take place.

=== Colours ===
The club described its colours as blue and white, without giving any more specific detail.

=== Ground ===
Ingram played at Argyle Park, near Paisley Road toll. It later became the ground of Fairfield.

== Kilmarnock Thistle F.C. ==
Kilmarnock Thistle
- Founded: 1885
- Dissolved: 1889
- Ground: Public Ground
- Match Secretary: J. Bowie
Home colours

=== History ===
The first reference to the Ayrshire club is of a New Year's Day fixture against "Ashbank" in 1886; however there is no record of the club playing a match until New Year's Day 1887, when the Thistle beat Paisley Anchor 4–2.

The club played at a junior level in 1887–88, including a 15–0 win over Avonhaugh, and at the close of the season the Thistle was invited to play in the Kilmarnock Charity Cup. Thistle beat Kilmarnock Rangers 5–2 at Hurlford, and, after Kilbirnie cried off a semi-final against Hurlford, the Thistle sent a last-minute scratch team to play instead, losing 4–1, but earning some funds for charity. In the "official" semi-final, Thistle held Kilmarnock to a 0–0 draw at Rugby Park. Kilmarnock won the replay 5–1, but ended up playing in an impromptu final - again against Hurlford - after Kilmarnock was unable to form an XI. Hurlford won 2–0 but Thistle received praise for its willingness to help at the last moment for a second time.

Given its good showings in a difficult environment, the Athletic joined the Scottish Football Association in August, and entered the 1888–89 Scottish Cup. However the club scratched from its first round tie with Maybole, key player Andrew Campbell having been recruited by Kilmarnock, and indeed does not seem ever to have played as a senior club. The club was duly struck off the Scottish FA roll at the end of the season.

=== Colours ===
The club wore blue and black hooped shirts and white knickers.

=== Ground ===
The club's ground was simply given out as being the Public Ground.

== Kilsyth Standard F.C. ==
Kilsyth Standard
- Founded: 1890
- Dissolved: 1893
- Ground: Balmallock Park
- Hon. Secretary: D. Brown
- Match Secretary: T. Inglis
Home colours

=== History ===
The short-lived club from Kilsyth was formed in April 1890, signing up 22 members inside one week at the start of the 1890–91 season. The club affiliated to the Stirlingshire Association, so played in the Stirlingshire Cup from 1890–91 to 1892–93, and also entered the Scottish Qualifying Cup for the latter two seasons; it lost every tie it played, usually heavily, the nadir being a 12–2 defeat by Dunipace in the 1891–92 Stirlingshire, a month after only losing to the same club 4–3 in the Qualifying. The club's second and last Qualifying Cup tie, a 6–0 defeat to Camelon, got worse after the match, as Camelon complained about being overcharged its share of expenses for the tie by 13s 6d.

The club did get revenge over Dunipace in the Kilsyth Charity Cup in 1892–93, with a 3–0 win; the club had reached the final the previous year, losing 4–1 to Smithstone Hibs.

Given that Kilsyth already had the Kilsyth Wanderers F.C. as well as Smithstone, there was little chance of the Standard succeeding, and it was wound up in August 1893. The name was later used by a juvenile club.

=== Colours ===
The club wore dark blue.

=== Ground ===
The club played at Balmallock Park.

== Kirkintilloch Harp F.C. ==
Kirkintilloch Harp
- Founded: 1885
- Dissolved: 1889
- Ground: Bellfield Road
- Hon. Secretary: A. Corcoran
- Match Secretary: Thomas Mochan
Home colours

=== History ===
The club was founded in 1885, the same year as two other clubs in Kirkintilloch, namely Athletic and Central. The club's earliest recorded match was at home to Falkirk Harp at the start of 1886, but was ill-omened on two accounts - firstly, the only goal of the game (scored by Falkirk) was disputed and never resolved, and secondly, a storm ended the game after an hour.

Athletic got the jump on the other sides by joining the Scottish Football Association almost immediately, while Central and Harp waited until 1886. Although by 1886 the Harp was the biggest of the three sides, it was further restricted by its being a club for the Irish diaspora, rather than the wider constituency available to the other clubs; indeed its friendly matches were often against other "Celtic" clubs, such as Glasgow Harp, Springburn Harp, and Lambhill Harp.

The other major problem for the club progressing in the senior game was its location in Dunbartonshire, which had three of the strongest teams in the world in the county. With the Scottish Cup being drawn on a regional basis, the Harp was particularly unlucky with its two entries; in the 1886–87 Scottish Cup it was drawn to visit Renton, and in the 1887–88 Scottish Cup it was drawn to face the previous year's semi-finalists Vale of Leven.

The club therefore scratched from both ties, only 7 of the side turning up to the Vale of Leven tie, so the clubs played out a friendly instead. The club nearly fell apart completely in the aftermath of the Vale of Leven fiasco, two of its best players (Keenan and Friel) joining Athletic.

It also never entered the Dunbartonshire Cup, so never took part in a competitive match at a national or county level. Its only competitive football came in the Kirkintilloch Jubilee Cup, for the first and second XIs in the town itself, and first held in 1886–87 to commemorate the Golden Jubilee of Queen Victoria in 1887. Even in that the club proved to be behind Central and Athletic; its only win came against Kirkintilloch Rob Roy in 1888–89, and it lost the final to Athletic 10–0.

The club withdrew from senior football when not renewing its Scottish FA membership in August 1888, and the defeat to the Athletic in the Jubilee Cup final seems to have been the club's last match. An unrelated Junior club started up in 1894.

=== Colours ===
The club wore green jerseys with a heart on the left breast, green hose, and "dark" knickers.

=== Ground ===
The club's home ground was Bellfield Park, 8 minutes from Kirkintilloch railway station.

== Lanark F.C. (1878) ==
Lanark
- Founded: 1878
- Dissolved: 1882
- Ground: Peesweep Meadows
- Secretary: John Meikle, Andrew Frood
Home colours

=== History ===
The club from the county town of Lanarkshire was founded in 1878. Its earliest recorded match is a 1–0 win over Wishaw in November 1879.

Lanark's first competitive football was in the first Lanarkshire Cup in 1879–80, losing 1–0 at home to eventual winners Stonelaw in the first round. The club had the benefit of a "handsome donation" from Sir Windham Carmichael-Anstruther, 8th Baronet in December 1879, and it joined the Scottish Football Association in 1880, after a season of even form (6 wins, 6 draws, and 3 defeats). The club therefore played in the 1880–81 Scottish Cup and lost in the first round to Shotts.

Lanark entered the 1881–82 Scottish Cup and Lanarkshire Cup, but scratched from both competitions to Clarkston. Lanark did eventually visit Clarkston for a friendly in January 1882, but lost 6–0.

Never an active or large club - in 1880–81 it only had 29 members and played 10 matches - it was struck from the Scottish FA roll in August 1882. It was still active in the months afterwards, the first two XIs playing a practice match on the Racecourse in October, but it did not play competitive football again.

=== Colours ===
Lanark wore navy blue jerseys, white knickers with a blue stripe, and red hose.

=== Ground ===
The club's original ground on the Peesweep Meadows was one mile from Lanark railway station. By May 1880 it moved to Lanark Racecourse.

== Lochmaben F.C. (1881) ==
Lochmaben
- Founded: 1881
- Dissolved: 1885
- Ground: Stairdyke Park
- President: James Wright
- Match Secretary: James Affleck
Home colours

=== History ===
The club, from Lochmaben village in Dumfriesshire, was founded in 1881, and joined the Scottish Football Association in 1882, having won 3 and lost 4 of its first season's matches. One of the wins had been against Queen of the South Wanderers, although owing to a mix-up as to which side had been invited to Lochmaben, the Wanderers sent its third XI, much to the dismay of the Lochmaben players, who threatened to walk off unless the first XI attended; which persuaded the Wanderers thirds to masquerade as the firsts, in order to get a game.

Lochmaben entered the 1882–83 Scottish Cup, and was drawn against the Wanderers, but by now the players had realized that the first XI was much too strong for the Lochmaben side, and scratched. The club had not been helped by a number of players from its first season having left the village before 1882–83, as was demonstrated by an 11–1 at home Moffat in the first round of the Churchill Cup, conceding 8 in the first half.

It did not renew its Scottish FA subscription and it withdrew from the 1883–84 Churchill Cup. The club did continue playing into the 1884–85 season, albeit at a very minor level. The next senior club in the town - Rising Thistle - would be even more unsuccessful for longer.

=== Colours ===
The club's colours were blue and white.

=== Ground ===
The club played at Stairdyke Park, adjoining the High Street.

== Maybole Thistle F.C. ==
Maybole Thistle
- Founded: 1876
- Dissolved: 1878
- Ground: Spring Garden Park
- Match Secretary: Samuel M'Call
Home colours

=== History ===
The Ayrshire club was the second club founded in Maybole, after Carrick. The earliest recorded match for the club is a 6–1 win over the obscure Ayr Bonnie Doon club in February 1877.

Thistle joined the Scottish Football Association in September 1877 and entered the 1877–78 Scottish Cup, but lost 4–0 to Kilmarnock Cricket & Football Club.

The club continued to the end of the 1877–78 season, but did not enter the first Ayrshire Cup that season, and seems to have disbanded afterwards. The Maybole Thistle name was revived in 1884 for a junior club.

=== Colours ===
The club wore "light navy blue" jerseys, white knickers, and blue and white hose.

=== Ground ===
The club played at Spring Garden Park, a mile from Maybole railway station.

== Newton Stewart F.C. ==
Newton Stewart (Clerks)
- Founded: 1889
- Dissolved: 1891
- Ground: Minniegaff
- Hon. Secretary: J. H. Cooper-Dashwood, Esq.
- Match Secretary: Allan M Nicholson
Home colours

=== History ===
The club, from Newton Stewart in Wigtownshire, is first recorded in 1889, under the name Newton Stewart Clerks, entering the Churchill Cup. Match secretary Allan Nicholson was a chemist.

The Clerks entered the three local competitions - including the Law Cup and Wigtownshire Cup - in 1890–91, and in 1891–92 tried its luck in the Scottish Cup, under the shorter name Newton Stewart. The only recorded victory in any of its competitive matches was over Wigtown in the 1890–91 county competition; in the Scottish Cup, it was drawn to host Annan, and the game ended 2–2, despite rumours that the Clerks had scratched. However the club did indeed scratch from the replay, as it was being absorbed into Newton Stewart Athletic.

=== Colours ===
The club wore chocolate and grey 1" vertical stripes, with white knickers. The colours were adopted by the Athletic the following season.

=== Ground ===
The club played at Minniegaff.

== Oakfield F.C. ==
Oakfield
- Founded: 1877
- Dissolved: 1880
- Ground: Hill End Park
- Secretary: James Barbour
Home colours

=== History ===
The unfortunate Oakfield club was one of many which emerged in Greenock, Renfrewshire, in the 1870s and 1880s. Oakfield was earlier than most, founded in 1877, and playing its first match in October that year, albeit fielding 13 players against 11 of the East End club of Greenock.

Oakfield joined the Scottish Football Association in 1880, having won 6 and lost 5 of its 11 matches in 1879–80; however, before playing its 1880–81 Scottish Cup first round tie against Netherlee, the club was forced to scratch, having just lost use of its ground, and therefore had to lie dormant for the season. However the club never re-started, players having found berths elsewhere - Gregg, Millar, Aitken, Barbour, and Fleming in particular to Morton, mostly in the second XI.

=== Colours ===
The club wore navy jerseys, white knickers, and red stockings.

=== Ground ===
Oakfield's home ground was Hill End Park, a minute from Cartsdyke railway station.

== Orchard F.C. ==
Orchard
- Founded: 1881
- Dissolved: 1885
- Ground: Albert Park
- Hon. Secretary: Hugh M'Whinnie
- Match Secretary: James Lawrie
Home colours

=== History ===
The Orchard club was from Oatlands, Glasgow to the south-east of the city centre. It was founded in 1881, and joined the Scottish Football Association in August 1883. Orchard won its first Scottish Cup tie 4–2 at Possilpark in September 1883, but lost 8–1 to Partick Thistle in the second round, although the tie was closer than the score suggested, with the Orchard having a lot of late pressure. On the same day as the second round tie, the Orchard second XI lost 15–0 at the 3rd Lanarkshire Rifle Volunteers in the Second XI Cup.

With only 30 members in 1884, the club was the smallest in Glasgow, but it had quite a successful first season as a senior club, with 9 wins in 15 matches. However it scratched from its entry to the 1884–85 Scottish Cup and in August 1885 it was struck off the Scottish FA roll.

=== Colours ===
The club wore red and black jerseys with white knickers.

=== Ground ===
The club played at Albert Park in Braehead Street, a 2 minute walk from the Rutherglen Road car terminus.

== Our Boys F.C. (Glasgow) ==
Our Boys
- Founded: 1875
- Dissolved: 1878
- Ground: Belvidere
- Hon. Secretary: W. P. Stewart
Home colours

=== History ===
The Our Boys club was formed in Parkhead, north-east Glasgow, in 1875. It was one of the first clubs to play on the Isle of Bute, playing a representative club at Ardbeg Point in August 1876, winning 2–1.

Our Boys joined the Scottish Football Association in September 1877 and entered the 1877–78 Scottish Cup.

With a membership of 40, the club was one of the better-resourced sides in Glasgow, but in the first round of the Cup it was drawn to visit South Western, one of the few sides with a significantly larger membership, and South Western had an easy 8–0 win, despite Our Boys having "played hard". The club never played another competitive match again, the last fixture recorded being at Shaughraun at the end of the year.

=== Colours ===
The club wore blue jerseys, white knickers, and grey and white hose.

=== Ground ===
The club played at the Belvidere ground in Parkhead, shared with Blackfriars.

== Rangers (Sanquhar) F.C. ==
Rangers (Sanquhar)
- Founded: 1892
- Dissolved: 1892
- Ground: none
- Secretary: John Murphy

The club from the village of Sanquhar, in Dumfriesshire, whose name was registered as Rangers (Sanquhar) but often given as Sanquhar Rangers, seems to have played only in 1892. It was admitted to the Scottish Football Association in August 1892 despite not having its own ground, on the understanding that it would play all its competitive matches away from home, and it did not register any colours with the Scottish FA. In the first preliminary round of the 1892–93 Scottish Cup, it was drawn against St Cuthbert's Wanderers, but it scratched before the tie.

Its only recorded matches come in October 1892: a 4–4 draw with Kirkton Rangers in the Southern Counties Cup, both clubs being put through to the second round but Sanquhar scratching to the Gladstonians of Dumfries there; and against Annan in the Churchill Cup, the Rangers going down 7–0. Goalkeeper Hannay was found between the posts for the Gladstonians the following season, while half-back Jeff and forwards Little and M'Kinnell were with Maxwelltown Thistle.

== Shettleston Swifts F.C. ==
Shettleston Swifts
- Nickname: the Swifts
- Founded: 1890
- Dissolved: 1894
- Ground: Cyprus Park
- Hon. Secretary: J. Marshall
- Match Secretary: W. Carmichael
Home colours

=== History ===
Although a Shettleston Swifts club played in the mid-1880s, this particular club, from Shettleston, Lanarkshire, is first recorded in 1890, as "one of the youngest recruits to the county". It entered the Lanarkshire Cup that season, losing its first tie to Uddingston 4–1.

Undaunted, it entered the qualifying rounds of the 1891–92 Scottish Cup, but lost 5–1 at Thistle. The club's four Lanarkshire Cup entries all ended in defeats in the club's first ties, as did its three entries to the Scottish Cup.

Outgunned in the professional era, the club was struck from the Scottish FA membership list in 1894.

=== Colours ===
The club played in all white.

=== Ground ===
The Swifts' home ground was Cyprus Park.

== Springburn Hibernians F.C. ==
Springburn Hibernians
- Founded: 1884
- Dissolved: 1886
- Ground: Blenheim Park
- Secretary: John Higgins
Home colours

=== History ===
The club from Springburn in north-east Glasgow was founded in 1884; after playing just 2 matches (albeit winning both), the club joined the Scottish Football Association in August 1884.

The Hibernians thereby entered the 1884–85 Scottish Cup, and gained a walkover in the first round, as opponents Orchard scratched. In the second round, the club lost 2–0 against Dean Park, the match held at Rangers' Kinning Park, and the Hibernians conceding in the first minute.

In the second half of the season, the club entered the Glasgow North Eastern Cup for the only time, gaining a creditable 2–2 draw with Northern before the campaign got under way. In the competition itself, the Hibernians got past Eastern Athletic in the first round after the Athletic protested a 6–3 win for the Hibernians, but went down 6–1 to Cowlairs in the semi-final.

The club's last recorded match was a 3–1 win over Airdrie after the Cowlairs defeat, with praise for Nash, M'Laughlin, and Gallacher. However, with the north-east football landscape being increasingly dominated by Cowlairs and Northern, the club was struck off the Scottish FA roll in August 1885, along with neighbours Springburn and Petershill.

=== Colours ===
The club wore dark green jerseys and hose, and white knickers.

=== Ground ===
The club played at Blenheim Park in Springburn, 2 minutes' walk from the Springburn 'bus.

== Vale of Annan F.C. ==
Vale of Annan
- Founded: 1886
- Dissolved: 1886
- Ground: Crooks Meadow
- Secretary: William Harland
Home colours

=== History ===
There is no evidence that the Vale of Annan ever played a single match. Formed in 1886 in Moffat, Dumfriesshire, and taking the name of a side which had existed in 1882–83, it had come into existence seven years after the Moffat F.C., which was an established club with a hundred members.

The club had an ambitious start; with 50 claimed members, it joined the Scottish Football Association almost on formation, and entered the 1886–87 Scottish Cup. Before the season opened, the club sent three 5-a-side teams to a tournament at the Moffat Games, and the first choice selection carried off the medals, by beating a 5th K.R.V. select 3–0 in the final.

The club was drawn to play Vale o' Nith in the Cup, but scratched before the tie, enabling Vale o' Nith to play the 5th K.R.V., similarly without a tie because of a scratching opponent.

The next note of the club is of its removal from the Scottish FA register in August 1887. At least three of the club's successful 5-a-side team - John Smith, James McBryde, and William Robertson - were playing for Moffat later in the season, and another (John Richardson) also became a Moffat player.

=== Colours ===
The club's registered colours were white jerseys, with an undefined red badge, and white knickers. Club secretary Harland was the son of a tailor, which may have helped in having badges sewn on.

=== Ground ===
The club's ground was Crooks Meadow, half-a-mile from Moffat railway station.

== Vale of Calder F.C. ==
Vale of Calder
- Founded: 1877
- Dissolved: 1877
- Ground: Hole Farm
- Hon. Secretary: John Barr
Home colours

=== History ===
The Lochwinnoch, Ayrshire club was founded in 1877 and joined the Scottish Football Association in September. It entered the 1877–78 Scottish Cup, and lost 3–2 at Ayr Academicals in the first round, its second XI drawing with the Glengarnock second XI at home on the same day.

The following month the club won 2–0 at St Mirren, but it never seems to have played again.

=== Colours ===
The club wore blue jerseys and hose, and white knickers.

=== Ground ===
The club's ground was at Hole Farm, near Lochwinnoch railway station, and it used the Temperance Hotel for changing facilities.

== Waverley F.C. (Kirkintilloch) ==
Waverley
- Founded: 1876
- Dissolved: 1877
- Ground: Green's Farm
- Hon. Secretary: Andrew Lawrie
Home colours

=== History ===
The club was founded in Kirkintilloch, Dunbartonshire, in 1876, the year after the first senior club in the town (the 10th D.R.V.), and named after a local park. Its first recorded match was a 2–0 win over Milton of Campsie, thanks to goals from Gourlay and Lawrie.

Waverley entered the 1877–78 Scottish Cup, and lost 4–0 at Dumbarton in the first round, only threatening the home side's goal twice, and demonstrating that they had "much to learn in the way of passing and backing up". However the club barely played again; its final recorded fixture was against Petershill in December 1877. The club had no relation to the Edinburgh club of the same name.

=== Colours ===
The club described its colours as red, white, and blue, without being more specific.

=== Ground ===
The club's ground at Green's Farm was just outside the town, about half a mile from Lenzie.

== West-End Athletic F.C. ==
West-End Athletic
- Founded: 1879
- Dissolved: 1884
- Ground: Williamsburgh Park
- President: J. W. Birnland
- Match Secretary: James Cumming, George Wilson Jr
- Captain: J. B. Walker, James Greer
Home colours

=== History ===
The Paisley, Renfrewshire club was formed in 1879, with matches reported from January 1880. Its name was always rendered as West-end or West-End, i.e. with the hyphen.

West-End joined the Scottish Football Association in August 1883. This was probably not misguided optimism as, in the 1882–83 season, the club had shown potential to prosper as a senior club. It had beaten St Mirren's second XI 3–1, and beat the senior Sir John Maxwell in its first match in the Renfrewshire Cup, "contrary to expectation", Brannan scoring the only goal of the game in the first five minutes. In the quarter-final the club narrowly lost 3–2 to Johnstone Rovers in the quarter-final, the Athletics' protest against one of the Rovers being cup-tied being dismissed. At the end of the season, it made its debut in the first Paisley Charity Cup, and beat another senior side, Woodside, with whom the West-End had developed a keen rivalry, 4–1. In the semi-final it lost at Paisley Athletic, but reportedly "showed up remarkably well".

There may therefore have been hopes that the club would not be outgunned in its first Scottish Cup entry in 1883–84. In the first round, the Athletics visited Busby to play Cartvale, were 3–0 down at half-time, and, despite having wind and slope in their favour for the second half, finished up losing 8–0.

With other clubs in Paisley including St Mirren, Abercorn, and Paisley Athletic, there was no room for the club at senior level. The momentum had run out; West-End did not appear at Clippens in the first round of the Renfrewshire - indeed, the club did not play at all until the Paisley Charity Cup committee selected the club to play in the competition, and the club committee decided to revive the club once more. West-End drew 1–1 in a warm-up match against Glenpatrick but, in the cup tie, the club was hammered 12–0 by St Mirren. West-End was duly struck off the Scottish FA's roll in August 1884.

=== Colours ===
The club wore white jerseys and blue knickers.

=== Ground ===
The club's first ground was Westmarch, later the home of St Mirren. In 1881 it moved to Williamsburgh Park, a 5 minute walk from Paisley railway station.

== Wick Rovers F.C. ==
Rovers (Wick)
- Founded: 1888
- Dissolved: 1895
- Ground: Harrow Park
- Secretary: W. Davidson
Home colours

=== History ===
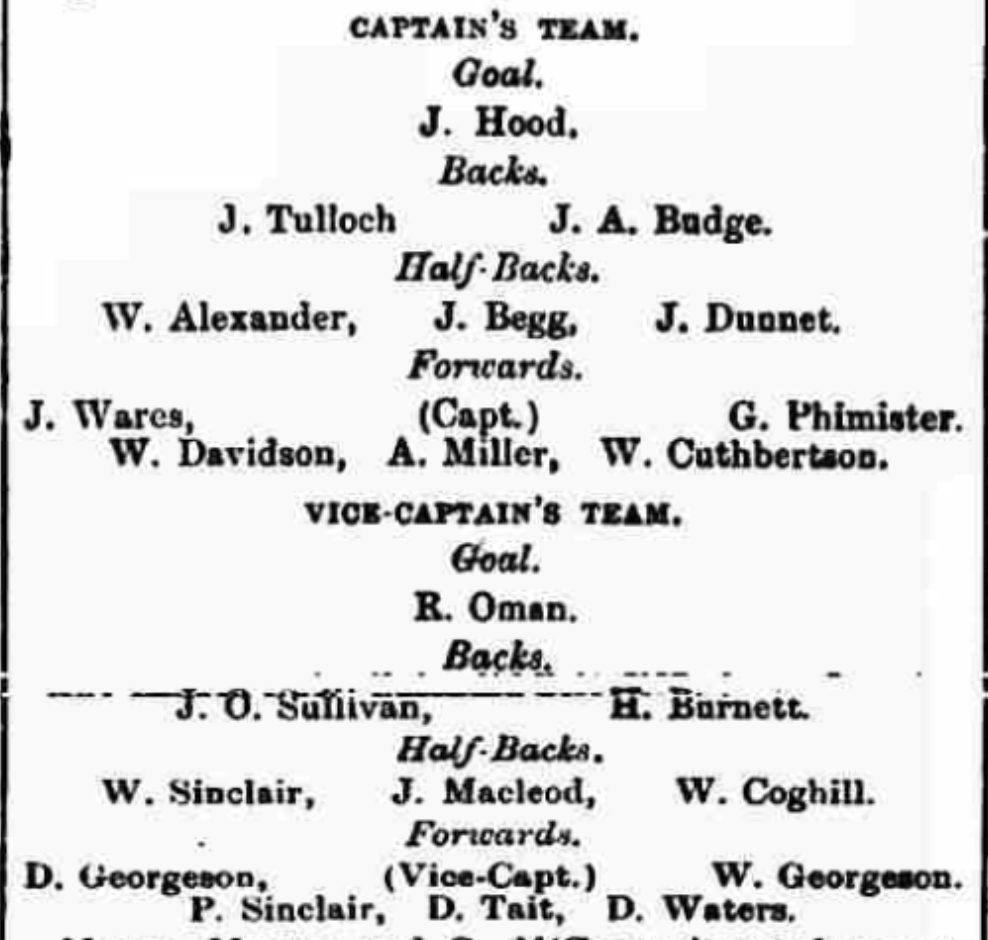
Wick Rovers F.C.'s first and second XIs, John o'Groat Journal, 3 January 1889

The Caithness club was the first senior football club in Wick. Its name was formally registered as Rovers (Wick) but almost invariably known as Wick Rovers.

The earliest record for the club date is of its raising funds in November 1888 Its first recorded match was a home game against Thurso Thistle in aid of charity; it was cut down to 70 minutes because of bad weather and the Rovers won 1–0.

Despite - or perhaps because - the club had very few options in the region for matches (more or less limited to clubs from Thurso and Lybster), in August 1891, Rovers joined the Scottish Football Association and entered the 1891–92 Scottish Cup. In the first qualifying round, the club was paired with Inverness Thistle, and, in accordance with Rule 10 of the competition rules, as the distance between the clubs was more than 100 miles, the tie was to take place at a neutral ground between the two. As Thistle was the nominal home club, it had to make the arrangements, and hired a ground in Golspie; however, the night before the match, Rovers scratched. As this was within the four day notice period required by the rules, the Scottish FA ordered the Rovers to pay the Thistle's expenses. This led to an argument about whether the Rovers had to pay the £2 2/ preaching fee of one of the Thistle players, who had arranged to stand down on the Sunday after the match, and this was deducted from the bill, the Rovers having to pay £2 13/ 9d.

Perhaps unsurprisingly, the Rovers did not renew its subscription for 1892–93. The club's demise was hastened by a weather disaster; the costs of staging a Highland Games event in August 1893 could not be recouped after heavy rains reduced crowds. The club continued until October 1895, when it was taken over by the John o'Groat club, which had already taken a number of Rovers players.

=== Colours ===
The club wore brown and yellow hooped (described as striped) jerseys with black knickers.

=== Ground ===
The club played at Harrow Park, granted for the club's use by Mr Wm. Clyne, flesher, of Pulteneytown. The ground is now known as Harmsworth Park and is the home of Wick Academy.

== Woodside F.C. ==
Woodside
- Founded: 1880
- Dissolved: 1883
- Ground: Regent Park
- President: William Lang, David Murray
- Hon. Secretary: George Orr
- Match Secretary: Alex Richmond, Archibald Adam
Home colours

=== History ===
Woodside F.C. was founded in Paisley, Renfrewshire on 7 June 1880. In its first season it had a record of 6 wins, 8 defeats, and 2 draws. The 1881–82 showed some improvement, in that the club's first XI had won 8 out of 14 matches and only lost 2, but one of the club's defeats had been in its first Renfrewshire Cup match, and the 15–1 shellacking from Cartvale meant the club finished the season with a negative goal difference.

Nevertheless the club joined the Scottish Football Association in June 1882. Woodside's only Scottish Cup entry followed three months later, with the club losing 6–0 at home to Kilbarchan. The month after the tie, it lost heavily again in the first round of the Renfrewshire, this time 11–2 at Port Glasgow Athletic, and even one of the Woodside goals was an own goal.

Although the club started 1883 in a financially "prosperous" state, it left the Scottish FA at the end of the season, and does not seem to have played again. The final competitive match for the club (apart from a defeat in a four-a-side tournament) had come in March 1883, a 4–1 defeat to West End Athletic, the club's closest rival, in the first Paisley Charity Cup; and the final match of all a 4–0 defeat the following month at Southern (Greenock).

=== Colours ===
The club wore white jerseys and knickers, with black and white hose.

=== Ground ===
The club's Regent Park ground was 1 mile from Paisley railway station.
