= Douglas Rovers F.C. =

Former association football club in Scotland

Douglas Rovers
- Full name: Douglas Rovers Football Club
- Nickname(s): the Rovers
- Founded: 1883
- Dissolved: 1894
- Ground: Balmoral Park
- Hon. Presidents: Mr M. J. Stewart MP, A. Young, J. W. Hutchison, W. K. Thornhill, and Major Spurgin
- President: Mr J. Dunn
- Secretary: William M Haugh
Home colours

Douglas Rovers F.C. was an association football club from Castle Douglas in Dumfriesshire.

== History ==
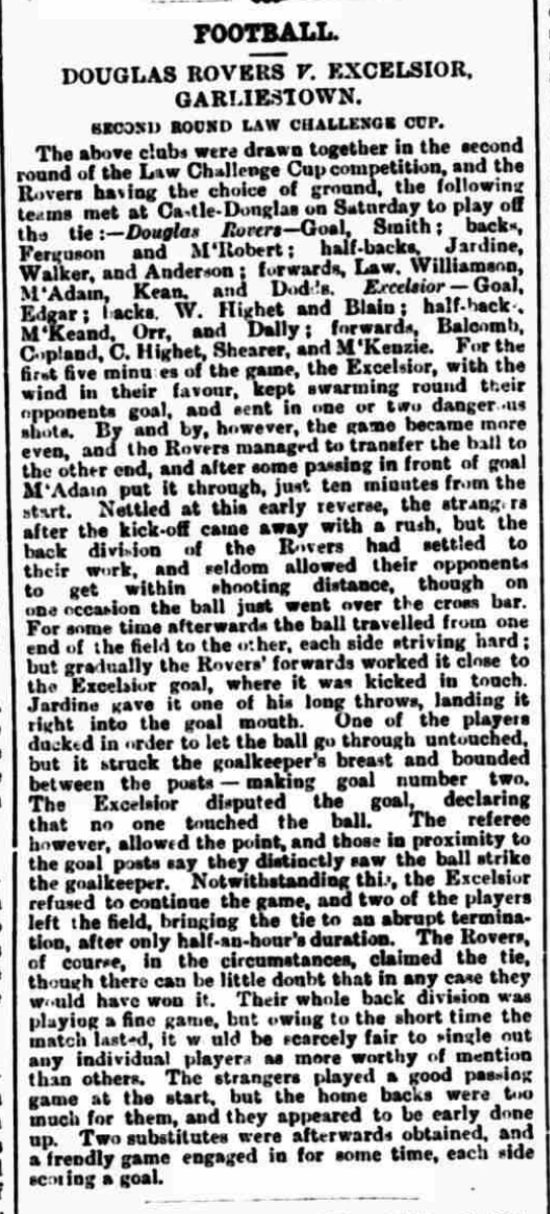
1889–90 Law Cup 2nd Round, Douglas Rovers 2a0 Excelsior, Kirkcudbrightshire Advertiser, 7 February 1890

The first reported matches for the club after from 1883.

After playing only low-key friendlies for a number of years, the club's activities became more serious in 1889–90. It rented a private ground in Balmoral Park and entered the Churchill Cup, the leading local competition, for the first time. In the first round the club was drawn at home to Garliestown Excelsior, and, despite consideration that the clubs were "well-matched", the Rovers had a surprisingly dominant 9–0 victory. The experienced Newton Stewart Athletic proved too strong in the second round, winning 7–4 at Balmoral Park,

The Rovers also entered the first Law Cup in 1889–90, a second-tier tournament for clubs in Wigtownshire and Kirkcudbrightshire, which did not include the top clubs in Dumfries. The club entered the competition four times, losing in the semi-final in its first three entries. The club protested its semi-final defeat to Wigtown in 1889–90 on the basis that a Wigtown player had struck a Rover, but, the evidence of blame being of "so contradictory a nature", the protest was dismissed.

The club's momentum continued with patronage from its local MP and its admission to the Scottish Football Association in August 1890 and entry to the 1890–91 Scottish Cup. However momentum was sharply checked as the club lost Williamson, Anderson, Law, and M'Morrine to the professional game in England, and, in the club's season-opening friendly at Dumfries, the Rovers went down 14–1. In the circumstances, a 5–0 defeat in the Cup at home to the 5th K.R.V., one of the strongest sides in the south of Scotland, was not a disgrace.

The club did at least win through two rounds of the Churchill Cup for the only time, facing down a protest by Barholm Rovers who alleged that Douglas had played professionals in the first round. losing in the quarter-final to Newton Stewart, again by a 7–4 scoreline, but this time away from home. At the close of the season, Balmoral Park hosted an inter-counties match between Kirkcudbrightshire and Wigtownshire, which ended 3–3; a veiled comment on the abilities of the current Rovers side was that "some ill-natured critics had prophesied a heavy defeat for the Stewartry [of Kirkcudbright] team, owing to the fact that it was mainly composed of Douglas Rovers".

The Scottish FA introduced qualifying rounds for the Scottish Cup from 1891–92, and the Rovers were drawn to visit Queen of the South Wanderers, the former Dumfries Wanderers which had changed its name to that of the previous dominant side in Dumfries. The score at half-time was 3–0 to the home side, who had had the benefit of playing in the wind; however a switchover of Craven from half-back to left-wing spurred the Wanderers on to a scoring spree, ending up with a 14–0 scoreline, 8 of which came in the final 15 minutes.

A new competition, the Southern Counties Cup, had started in 1891–92, and Rovers entered for the only time; after a win over Dumfries St John's (which St John's unsuccessfully protested on the grounds of darkness), the club had the misfortune to be drawn against Queen of the South Wanderers again, albeit this time "only" losing 10–2.

By now, the direction of travel was towards professionalism, and smaller clubs across the country were closing down. The Rovers would only win one more competitive match again - in the first qualifying round of the 1892–93 Scottish Cup, 6–2 at Thistle (Lochmaben), whose protest that the Rovers had turned up too late (because of a train problem) was dismissed. Rovers conceded a late equalizer in the second preliminary round at home to Annan but withdrew before the replay, with a schedule too full of local cup matches - Annan took advantage of the empty replay date to play in the Southern Counties Cup, while the Rovers gained its biggest competitive win, 14–1 over Carsluith Wanderers in the St Cuthbert's Cup for clubs in the Stewartry.

In a sign of the general decline in local football, despite the failings in the larger competitions, the Rovers had its most successful season on the pitch in 1892–93. The club finally won a Law Cup semi-final at the fourth time of asking, beating Stranraer 4–2 at Newton Stewart, coming from 2–1 behind, although it lost to Newton Stewart in the final. However the club did finish the season with its only trophy, the Stewartry Challenge Cup for second XIs, the Douglas Rovers second string beating the 5th K.R.V. reserves - the Kirkcudbright Scorpions - at Creetown, the side being greeted with a torchlight procession, "and were made the centre of a series of demonstrations peculiar to football optimists".

In its final full season, the club barely played; it scratched to Annan in its final Scottish Cup entry in 1893–94, and was thrown of the Scottish FA register in August 1894. The very final game recorded for the club was a 4–1 defeat to Vale of Fleet in the St Cuthbert's Cup in November 1894. A new club in town, Douglas Wanderers, which had started up the previous year, wearing the same colours, had effectively usurped the role of the Rovers, which quietly petered out.

== Colours ==
The club's colours were black and white vertical striped shirts.

== Ground ==
The club originally played at "Mr Rankin's field", and in 1888–89 at a field near Leigh House. From 1889, the club played at Balmoral Park.
