= Southern Counties Cup =

- Founded: 1891
- Region: Dumfries and Galloway
- Current champions: Caledonian Braves
- Most championships: Stranraer (20 wins)

The Southern Counties Cup is an association football cup competition for clubs in the historic counties of Dumfriesshire, Wigtownshire, and Kirkcudbrightshire, Scotland. The competition was founded in 1891.

== Format ==
The competition is a knock-out tournament contested by the member clubs of the Southern Counties Football Association, which was formed at the end of the 1890–91 season, with J. J. Cook of the 5th K.R.V. as initial president. The competition soon became the most prestigious competition in the region, supplanting the Churchill Cup.

== Initial entrants ==
- 5th K.R.V.
- Annan
- Dalbeattie
- Dumfries St John's
- Garliestown
- Gladstonians
- Mid-Annandale
- Moffat
- Newton Stewart Athletic
- Queen of the South Wanderers
- Rising Thistle
- St Cuthbert's Wanderers
- Thornhill

== History ==
The first competition, in 1891–92, was won by the 5th K.R.V., who beat Mid-Annandale 9–1 in the final. The score remains the highest margin of victory in the final. The two clubs had met in the final of the Churchill Cup two months before with the Mids winning 3–0; however, in the Southern Counties, one Mids player was sent off, three others walked off in sympathy, and the Volunteers scored three times from the penalty mark.

From 1898 there was also a Consolation Cup, for clubs eliminated before the final of the main competition. The last edition was in 1926–27, replaced by the short-lived South of Scotland Cup, the winners being awarded to Consolation Cup trophy.

The current (2023–24) holders are Caledonian Braves, who beat Dalbeattie Star 3–1 in the final at Galabank thanks to two late goals.

== Finals (incomplete) ==
Year	Winner	Score	Runner-up
1891–92	5th K.R.V.	9–1	Mid-Annandale
1892–93	Queen of the South Wanderers	2–1	Newton Stewart
1893–94	5th K.R.V.	4–1	Queen of the South Wanderers
1894–95	Maxwelltown Thistle	1–1, 3–2	5th K.R.V.
1895–96	St Cuthbert's Wanderers	4–1	Douglas Wanderers
1896–97	6th G.R.V.	8–0	St Cuthbert's Wanderers
1897–98	Dumfries	2–1	Dumfries Hibernians
1898–99	6th G.R.V.	4–1	Douglas Wanderers
1899–1900	Dumfries	4–2	6th G.R.V.
1900–01	Dumfries	4–3	6th G.R.V.
1901–02	Dumfries	3–0	Maxwelltown Volunteers
1902–03	Dumfries	3–1	Douglas Wanderers
1903–04	Nithsdale Wanderers	4–1	Vale of Dryfe
1904–05	Maxwelltown Volunteers	2–1	6th G.R.V.
1905–06	Dumfries	2–0	Nithsdale Wanderers
1906–07	Nithsdale Wanderers	1–0	Douglas Wanderers
1907–08	Maxwelltown Volunteers	5–1	Dalbeattie Star
1908–09	Dalbeattie Star	2–1	Nithsdale Wanderers
1909–10	Dumfries	1–0	Nithsdale Wanderers
1910–11	Nithsdale Wanderers	3–2	Dumfries
1912–13	Solway Star	3–3, 2–2, 1–0	Dumfries
1913–14	Nithsdale Wanderers	4–3	Whithorn
1924–25	5th K.O.S.B.	2–1	St Cuthbert's Wanderers
1919–20	Nithsdale Wanderers	2–0	St Cuthbert's Wanderers
1920–21	Queen of the South	1–0	Nithsdale Wanderers
1921–22	Nithsdale Wanderers	2–2, 2–0	Queen of the South
2022–23	Caledonian Braves	3–1	Dalbeattie Star
2023–24	Caledonian Braves	7–0	Newton Stewart

== Wins by club ==
Team	Wins	First win	Last win
5th K.O.S.B.	1	1914–15	-
5th K.R.V.	3	1891–92	1896–97
Annan Athletic	5	1989–90	2010–11
Bonnyton Thistle	1	2018–19	-
Caledonian Braves	2	2022–23	2023–24
Creetown	1	1984–85	-
Dalbeattie Star	13	1908–09	2021–22
Dumfries	8	1897–98	1909–10
Gretna	1	2004–05	-
Greystone Rovers	1	1957–58	-
Lincluden Swifts	2	1977–78	1978–79
Maxwelltown Thistle	1	1894–95	-
Maxwelltown Volunteers	2	1904–05	1907–08
Newton Stewart	6	1948–49	1983–84
Nithsdale Wanderers	10	1903–04	1945–46
Queen of the South Wanderers	1	1892–93	-
Queen of the South	19	1920–21	2015–16
St Cuthbert's Wanderers	6	1895–96	2009–10
Solway Star	2	1912–13	1937–38
Stranraer	20	1925–26	1994–95
Tarff Rovers	6	1949–50	2001–02
Threave Rovers	6	1964–65	2007–08
Whithorn	1	1954–55	-
Wigtown & Bladnoch	1	2013–14	-

The most successful club in the Consolation Cup was the second Mid-Annandale club, with four wins between 1909–10 and 1922–23. The only other club which won the Consolation Cup without ever winning the Southern Counties Cup was Vale of Dryfe, which won the Consolation Cup in 1901–02 and 1902–03.
