= Annan F.C. =

Former association football club in Scotland

Annan
- Full name: Annan F.C.
- Nickname(s): the Boys
- Founded: 1885
- Dissolved: 1895
- Ground: Cricket Field
- Hon. Secretary: W. S. Hughes
- Match Secretary: James Stewart, John Wright
1886–91 colours	1892–95 colours

Annan F.C. was an association football club from Annan, Dumfries and Galloway, active in the late 19th century.

== History ==
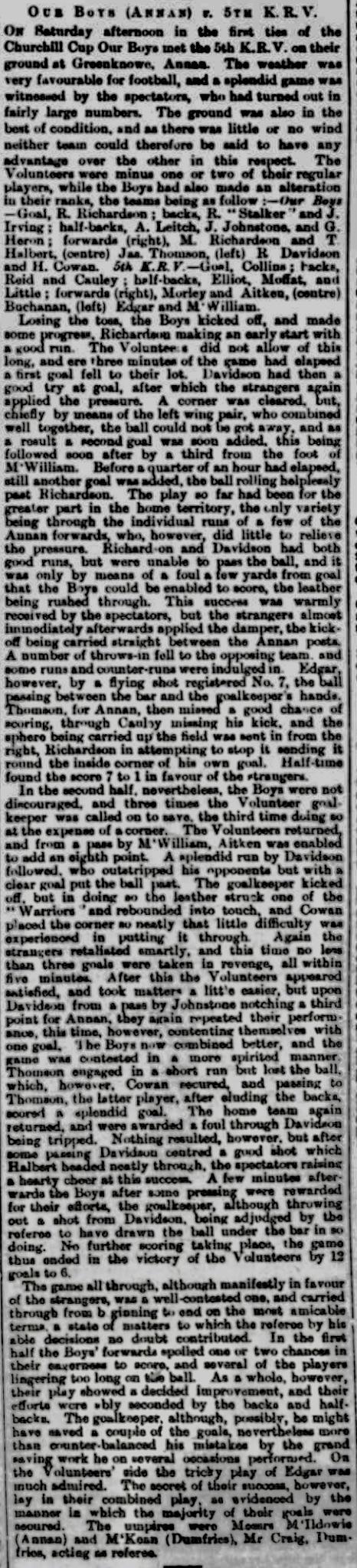
1889–90 Churchill Cup, Our Boys 6–12 5th K.R.V., Annandale Observer, 15 November 1889

The club was formed in 1885 under the name of Our Boys. Its first competitive football came in the Churchill Cup, for clubs in the south-west counties, in 1889–90; its first tie was a 12–6 defeat to the 5th K.R.V., and the club did not enter the competition again until 1892–93.

It also played in the Dumfries Charity Cup at the end of the season, but, this time, the 5th K.R.V. inflicted a 19–0 defeat. Perhaps to get rid of the stigma, on 1 May 1890 the club shortened its name to Annan, and in August joined the Scottish Football Association.

This enabled the club to enter the Scottish Cup, and its first game, in the first round of the 1890–91 tournament, it lost 8–2 at home to the new Dumfries Wanderers club, going in at half-time 6–0 down, and the blame being put on Annan's weak passing. From 1891 to 1892, the Scottish FA introduced qualifying rounds, and Annan did not make the first round proper again. Indeed, it never won a tie, although in 1892–93 it did get past Douglas Rovers after holding the Rovers to a draw, as Rovers scratched before the replay. Its last entry, in 1894–95, saw it lose 4–2 to the 5th K.R.V. in the first qualifying round.

Annan had a little more success in the Southern Counties Cup, which started to replace the Churchill Cup from 1891 to 1892. The club's first appearance in the competition was a 15–0 defeat at Mid-Annandale, which was so traumatic that the club scratched to the Mids in the forthcoming Scottish Cup preliminary round tie. Its best performance, to the semi-final in 1893–94, was down to the decline in the local game, as it walked over Thistle (Lochmaben), and gained a bye, with only one win, against the 3rd Galloway Rifle Volunteers in Stranraer. It lost the semi-final to its traditional nemesis, the 5th K.R.V., who won the competition.

The rise of professionalism in the game made it more difficult for clubs in smaller towns, especially near the Scottish borders, as it was easier for English clubs to persuade players to migrate; indeed Annan regularly played friendlies against English clubs - the largest crowd at Greenknowe was against the Moss Bay Exchange from Workington. A further distraction was the formation of a second side in Annan, Solway Rovers, which, although short-lived, proved a thorn in Annan's side; the first match between the two ended with the Annan players walking off in protest at an offside decision after 73 minutes, with Rovers ostensibly having gone 4–2 ahead, and in the 1892–93 Charity Cup, Rovers beat Annan 3–2.

In February 1895, the club bowed to the circumstances, and folded. On Annan's demise there were but five clubs remaining in the southern counties.

== Colours ==
The club's earliest recorded colours are blue and white striped shirts and white knickers, the knickers changing to blue (serge) in 1891. In 1892 the club changed its schema entirely to maroon jerseys with blue knickers.

== Ground ==
The club's home was originally the Cricket Field at Greenknowe. In 1894 it moved to a new cricket field at Closehead Park.
