= Maxwelltown Thistle F.C. =

Former association football club in Scotland

Maxwelltown Thistle
- Full name: Maxwelltown Thistle Football Club
- Nickname(s): the Thistle
- Founded: 1891
- Dissolved: 1895
- Ground: Recreation Grounds
- Secretary: William Henderson

Maxwelltown Thistle F.C. was an association football club from Dumfries in Scotland.

== History ==
The first reference to the club is losing against the obscure Maxwelltonians club in March 1891. The club played at a junior level for its first few seasons, and in 1892–93 was runner-up in the first Dumfries Junior Cup, losing 5–1 to the 5th K.R.V. reserves.

The club took a major step forward when Queen of the South Wanderers dissolved before the start of the 1894–95 season; a number of players, including Grierson, Charteris, Craven, Kennedy, Shankland, Glendenning, M'Cloy, and Little all turned out for the Thistle, having previously turned out for Queens. The club however did not seek senior status and continued on a junior basis.

The Thistle thereupon had a banner season in 1894–95, finishing as runner-up in the Churchill Cup to the 5th K.R.V. first XI, Thistle's protest that the Volunteers' Alexander Ireland had played for money in the United States was dismissed. The Thistle gained revenge in the Southern Counties Cup, beating 5th K.R.V. in a replay; the original final ended 1–1 after a thunderstorm ruined the second half, but Thistle took the trophy with a 3–2 win in the replay at Palmerston.

However it was the club's final match. It could not secure a ground for 1895–96, despite its "great hopes" of being able to do so, and six of its players were soon found playing for the 5th K.R.V. in the 1895–96 Scottish Cup.

== Ground ==
The club first played at Kingholm Park, and in 1894 inherited the Recreation Grounds from Queen of the South Wanderers. The club found, to its chagrin, that the owner of the field where it played had ploughed the pitch up before the 1894–95 season ended, so it decamped to Palmerston Park for its final fixtures.
