= Rising Thistle F.C. =

Rising Thistle
- Nickname: Young Mids
- Founded: 1890
- Dissolved: 1894
- Ground: West Croft
- Match Secretary: J. Thomson, George Copeland
- Hon. Secretary: W. Wells
Home colours

Rising Thistle Football Club was a 19th-century association football club based in Lochmaben, Dumfriesshire, Scotland.

== History ==
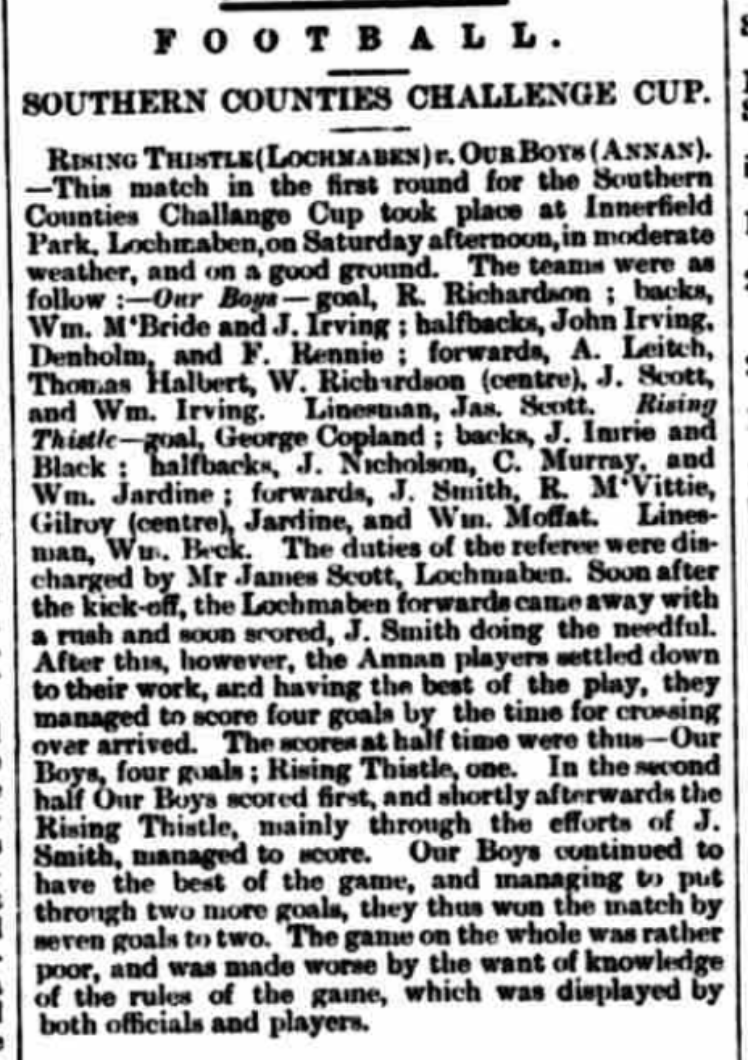
1891–92 Southern Counties Cup 1st Round, Rising Thistle 2–8 Annan, Annandale Herald, 17 September 1891

The club was founded as Rising Thistle; from 1891, the club registered its name as Thistle (Lochmaben). The media often continued to refer to the club as Rising Thistle.

It joined the Scottish Football Association in 1890, despite having no record of which to speak before doing so. It was, statistically, one of the least successful in Scottish senior football, mirroring the few results of the previous senior club in the village Lochmaben. Its results in competitive ties were:

- 1890–91 Scottish Cup first round: lost 16–1 to Mid-Annandale
- 1890–91 Churchill Cup first round: lost 17–0 to Dumfries
- 1891–92 Churchill Cup first round: lost 13–0 at home to the 5th K.R.V.
- 1891–92 Southern Counties Cup first round: lost 7–2 at home to Annan
- 1892–93 Scottish Cup first qualifying round: lost 6–2 at home to Douglas Rovers
- 1892–93 Churchill Cup first round: lost 14–0 at home to Mid-Annandale
- 1892–93 Southern Counties Cup first round: lost 8–0 at home to Gladstonians
- 1893–94 Scottish Cup first qualifying round: lost 9–0 at home to the 5th K.R.V.

Thistle protested its 1892 defeat to Douglas Rovers, on the basis that the Rovers did not turn up on time for the tie; however, as this was down to a delay on the trains, the protest was not entertained. It also protested its defeat to Mid-Annandale later that year on the basis that the Steel brothers had played for Moffat in the Churchill Cup, so were therefore Cup-tied - the club presented the protest to the referee at half-time, when the score was a mere 5, the Mids thereafter showing no mercy.

The club scratched from the 1891–92 Scottish Cup when drawn to visit Newton Stewart, putting it down to "the distance to be travelled and the unsuitable tram arrangements", and also from its last entry in competitive football, in the 1893–94 Southern Counties Cup against Annan; indeed the Annan reserve XI was strong enough to beat Thistle 3–0 in October 1893.

The club did at least win in its final season, 3–1 against Dumfries Thistle in September 1893. However a new Lochmaben club had started up, and, with several players (Robert M'Vittie, William Moffat, Brown, and Scott) having switched allegiances, the new club was already capable of holding the older one to a draw. The return at Innerfield in October 1893 ended in a way that summed up the club's tragicomic existence; with the game goalless, the ball burst, and Thistle did not have a replacement.

Thistle was struck from the Scottish FA register in August 1894, and the Thistle players re-joined with their former team-mates at Lochmaben, to play as Lochmaben Thistle, albeit not as a senior club.

== Colours ==
The club's original colours were black and yellow. In 1891 it changed to 1" dark blue and white "parallel" (i.e. vertical) striped shirts.

== Ground ==
The club originally played at West Croft. In 1892 it moved to Innerfield Park, which was provided free by a Mr Gass, who owned Innerfield Farm; the club presented him with a handsome timepiece in gratitude.
