= Churchill Cup (Scotland) =

- Founded: 1881
- Abolished: 1895
- Region: Dumfries and Galloway
- Most championships: 5th K.R.V. (6 titles)

The Churchill Cup was an association football cup competition for clubs in the historic counties of Dumfriesshire, Wigtownshire, and Kirkcudbrightshire, Scotland. The competition was founded in 1881 and was last competed for in the 1894–95 season. Before the emergence of the Southern Counties Cup, it was the most prestigious local tournament for clubs in the south of Scotland.

== Format ==
The competition was a knock-out tournament contested by the member clubs of the South of Scotland Football Association. The competition was the inspiration of the Rev. W. H. Churchill, who had played for Cambridge University A.F.C. in the 1870s, and after he had taken up a post in Moffat, set up a football club there. On his leaving for a new post in Reigate, the Reverend proposed a trophy for the clubs of the three southern counties to play for, and the competition which ensued was named after him.

== Initial entrants ==
- 5th K.R.V.
- Bladnoch
- Drumlanrig Rangers
- Dumfries Herald
- Dumfries Thistle
- Gatehouse
- Glenluce
- Kirkcudbright Athletic
- Moffat
- Newton Stewart Athletic
- Queen of the South Wanderers
- Stranraer
- Thornhill
- Vale o' Nith

== History ==
The first competition, in 1881–82, ended in an unusual tie. After the 5th K.R.V. and Newton Stewart drew twice, and with employers of the players of both teams threatening players with dismissal because of the full day needed to travel and play, the competition committee declared the competition to be shared by both sides.

The first winner outright, in 1882–83, was the Dumfries side Vale o' Nith, to the surprise of even the Vale players themselves. The local association expressed some concern that the supporters of other Dumfries clubs had been too vigorous in their support of the Vale against the out-of-towners Newton Stewart.

The competition was affected by a professionalism scandal in 1889–90. Members of the Queen of the South Wanderers had been involved in an acrimonious legal dispute with regard to the payment of off-book expenses. The evidence presented in court suggested that the Wanderers had been paying players in breach of Scottish Football Association rules. After the Wanderers beat Moffat 3–1 in the first round of the Churchill Cup on 16 November 1889, Moffat raised a protest that the club was employing professionals; after three secret sittings inside a week, the Scottish FA expelled the Wanderers for professionalism, along with the entire committee and two players.

The region was known for extravagant scoring; the 5th K.R.V. and the QoS Wanderers shared a 7–7 draw in the Scottish Cup in 1883. The Churchill was in this tradition, with some extraordinary scores in finals. The record win in the tournament was from Mid-Annandale beating a moribund Vale o' Nith 19–1 in 1888–89, but other outlandish scores include the 5th K.R.V. winning 12–6 at Annan Our Boys in 1889–90, and Dumfries beating Rising Thistle of Lochmaben 17–0 in 1890–91. Rising Thistle played twice more in the tournament, losing 13–0 at home to the 5th K.R.V. in 1891–92 and 14–0 at home to Mid-Annandale in 1892–93.

The introduction of the Southern Counties Cup in 1891 involved many of the same teams, and it gradually took over from the Churchill Cup as the primary local tournament. At the start of the 1895–96 season, the Rev. Churchill, advised that the amateur game was "practically dead" in the region, withdrew the Cup from competition.

== Finals ==
Year	Winner	Score	Runner-up
1881–82	Newton Stewart/5th K.R.V.	3–3, 1–1	n/a
1882–83	Vale o' Nith	1–0	Newton Stewart
1883–84	5th K.R.V.	3–3, 1–0	Stranraer
1884–85	Queen of the South Wanderers (1)	6–1	Stranraer
1885–86	Queen of the South Wanderers (1)	4–4, 11–1	Moffat
1886–87	Mid-Annandale	4–3	Vale o' Nith
1887–88	Moffat	4-4, 7–6	Mid-Annandale
1888–89	5th K.R.V.	2–2, 4–2	Mid-Annandale
1889–90	Moffat	1–0	Newton Stewart
1890–91	5th K.R.V.	13–0	Newton Stewart
1891–92	Mid-Annandale	3–0	5th K.R.V.
1892–93	Queen of the South Wanderers (2)	6–0	Newton Stewart
1893–94	5th K.R.V.	7–0	Garliestown
1894–95	5th K.R.V.	3–2	Maxwelltown Thistle

The second Queen of the South Wanderers was a club founded as Dumfries Wanderers in 1890, which changed its name to that of the now-defunct original club in 1891.
