= Wishaw F.C. (1879) =

Former association football club in Scotland

Wishaw
- Full name: Wishaw F.C.
- Founded: 1879
- Dissolved: 1883
- Ground: Road End Park
- Match Secretary: William Campbell Rodger
Home colours

Wishaw Football Club was an association football club from Wishaw, Lanarkshire, active in the 19th century. It was the first senior football club from the town.

== History ==
The club was formed in 1879 and its earliest recorded match was a 4–0 defeat at home to the Queens Park F.C.'s "Hampden XI" of third-choice players in November that year. It generally kept a low key in its early years, only entering the Lanarkshire Cup once, in 1881–82, and scratching when drawn to face Cambuslang.

However, having won nearly half of its matches in 1881–82, the club joined the Scottish Football Association for the 1882–83 season and entered the Scottish Cup; this may have been a last gamble to keep the club alive, as it had next to no practice before the season started. A kindly first round draw put the club against fellow competition debutants Holytown and Wishaw won 2–0 with a goal in each half; Holytown's protest about rough play was not considered, although the Scottish FA warned Wishaw "to be more careful in the future" and Holytown at least got its deposit back.

In the second round the club faced Airdrie, a smaller club but one with much more experience, and Airdrie recorded a 6–2 victory, before a "meagre" crowd, Wishaw being given too much to do when playing with the slope in the second half, as Airdrie had rattled into a 5–0 lead by the turnaround.

With another club, Wishaw Swifts, rising in the town, Wishaw left the Scottish FA at the end of the season, with no recorded matches played after January 1883.

== Colours ==
The club wore navy jerseys and white knickers.

== Ground ==
The club originally played at Houldsworth Park. In order to turn senior, the club needed a private ground, and found one at Road End Park on Coltness Road, a 15-minute walk from Wishaw railway station.
