= Moffat F.C. =

Former association football club in Scotland

Moffat
- Full name: Moffat Football Club
- Nicknames: the Moffatonians, the Villagers, the Stripes
- Founded: 1880
- Dissolved: 1897
- Ground: Ballplay Road
- Secretary: G. S. Young
1880–87 colours	1891–97 colours

Moffat F.C. was an association football club from Moffat in Dumfriesshire.

== History ==
The club was founded in 1880 and entered the Scottish Cup for the first time in 1881–82, losing to the 5th Kirkcudbrightshire Rifle Volunteers F.C. in a first round replay. The club had strong links with local churches; the club presidents included the Rev. A. R. McEwen of the United Presbyterian Church and office-holders included the Rev. W. H. Churchill of Reigate and Rev. G. S. Ponsonby of Cambridge as honorary vice-presidents, the Rev. W. Pulsford as a representative of the club at the local association, and the Rev J. W. Randall as vice-captain of the side. The Rev. Churchill was from Moffat and after his move to England he donated a trophy, the Churchill Cup, which became the premier prize for clubs in Dumfriesshire.

=== Local competitions ===
The club became one of the strongest in the region, even having a feeder side (the Swifts) briefly in the 1880s. The club's local honours included winning the Churchill Cup in 1888 and 1890, and the Southern Counties Charity Cup in 1888.

The club played in the first-ever Charity Cup tie in 1884, against Queen of the South Wanderers F.C. of Dumfries, at the Vale o' Nith F.C. ground at Mildamhall. The game did not finish as Moffat walked off in protest at the refereeing; Moffat complaining that "a committee, composed mainly of Dumfries gentlemen, appointed a Dumfries referee for a match between a Dumfries club and strangers",

Oddly, the same situation arose in the final of the same competition against the same club in 1887, when the referee disallowed a claim for a foul by Moffat that the ball had been pulled out of goalkeeper J. Kirk's hands during a scrimmage on the goal-line. The Moffat players walked off the pitch, "loudly hooted" by the crowd, and the referee awarded the Cup to Queen of the South Wanderers; the latter agreed to a re-play of the final, which the Wanderers won.

The club's first Churchill Cup win in 1888 was as a result of beating Mid-Annandale in a final that saw 21 goals; eight in the original match (said to be the "roughest on record") and 13 in the replay, which ended 7–6 to Moffat. The 1890 triumph was considered a particular honour, as the 5th KRV, semi-final opponents, were allowed to bring in players from the Queen of the South Wanderers, and final opponents Newton Stewart F.C. had guest players from two other clubs.

=== Scottish Cup ===
The nature of the regionalized draws in the Scottish Cup in the 1880s was problematic for Moffat as the club was continually drawn against the 5th KRV in the earliest rounds, the Volunteers knocking the club out every season until 1886–87, bar one season in which the club withdrew.

Moffat finally beat the Volunteers in the second round in 1889–90, the Moffatonians having "a uniform excellence about their play on Saturday not often to be met with in a provincial team", and being notable for the size of the team, with several players standing over 6 feet tall. The club drew twice with Queen of the South Wanderers in the third round, which, under the rules in place at the time, meant both teams went through, and after beating Carfin Shamrock F.C. in the fourth, the club was drawn against Dundee East End F.C. in the fifth round; that season the round had 12 clubs, and Moffat was unlucky in not receiving a bye.

In the original match with East End, played at home, Moffat was handicapped by an illness to top scorer Easton, but took a two-goal lead within the first ten minutes; the Dundee side equalized with ten minutes to go, and Moffat was denied the win late on by East End goalkeeper M'Intosh "saving miraculously". The replay was at Dock Park, the home of Dundee Harp F.C., and attracted a crowd of over 5,000. Moffat went behind early, and equalized through an own goal, but, in a game criticized for its physicality, with M'Hardy of East End allowed to stay on the pitch despite being repeatedly warned by the referee for rough play, the Dundee side won through with some ease.

=== Decline ===
The East End replay was the club's final match in the competition proper; indeed, in the next four years, the club twice scratched from the competition, and twice lost in its first Preliminary Round tie. With professionalism legalized, and the rise of the Scottish League, the club remained staunch in its amateurism. For example, after losing 3–1 in the first round of the Churchill Cup to the Wanderers on 16 November 1889, Moffat raised a protest that the Wanderers were employing professionals, based on evidence in a Court case that ultimately led to the extinction of the Dumfries club.

One record the club set was simultaneously an indication of the slip in its status; on 15 March 1890, the club took part in the highest draw in club football, 10–10, in a friendly. That it was against the students of Edinburgh University who lived in Dumfries and Galloway demonstrated the calibre of opponent the club was now seeking out.

At the club's annual meeting in 1893, the Rev. Randall, by now club president, stated that "the club did not exist merely for the winning of matches - if it did, nothing could be easier to pay people to win them - but it existed for the purpose of carrying out the spirit of an idea that they were in a certain sense a band of brothers, of maintaining the spirit that animated the founder of the club, and which was expressed in the words of the poet, "A man's a man for a' that".

However, although the club's finances had been "in a favourable state" in the 1880s the club's approach meant it could not compete at higher levels. The club's last Scottish Cup tie was a 15–1 hammering at the revived Queen of the South Wanderers in 1893–94, the club's only goal being scored by Steel after about ten minutes to make the score 2–1, but by half-time Moffat had conceded 7. By the end of that season the club was "practically defunct", with the committee "finding it impossible to carry on its affairs".

The club did revive for the 1896–97 season, and reached the semi-final of the Southern Counties Cup. The club was also due to be a founder member of the Southern Counties League for 1897–98, but the club was dissolved before the season started.

== Colours ==
The club's colours were:

Moffat F.C. colours
Years	Shirts	Shorts
1880–87	Navy & white hoops	White
1887–89	Black & white 1-inch hoops	White
1889–91	Black & white 1-inch vertical stripes	Blue
1891–97	Maroon & white halves	Blue

== Ground ==
The club played at the Well Village Cricket Field on Ballplay Road in Moffat.

== Honours ==
Churchill Cup

- Winners: 1887–88, 1889–90

Southern Counties Charity Cup

- Winners: 1887–88
- Runners-up: 1886–87

== Notable players ==
- Jimmy Niven, full-back, who won a cap for Scotland while a Moffat player, in the 8–2 win over Ireland in 1885; Niven was also in the Moffat side for its final Scottish Cup tie in 1893.
- James Fraser, forward, who won a cap for Scotland while a Moffat player, in the 2–1 win over Ireland in 1891.
