= 5th King's Own Scottish Borderers F.C. =

Former association football club in Scotland

5th K.O.S.B. Football Club
- Full name: 5th King's Own Scottish Borderers Football Club
- Nicknames: the Borderers, the Terriers
- Founded: 1908
- Dissolved: 1919
- Ground: Palmerston Park, Dumfries
Home colours

The 5th King's Own Scottish Borderers Football Club was a football team based in Dumfries, Scotland.

== History ==
The club's origin is from volunteer regiments (i.e. part-time soldiers) being raised in response to increasing unrest within Continental Europe and the British Empire in the Victorian era. 5th K.O.S.B. came out of the disbanded Maxwelltown Volunteers F.C. side, after a reorganization of volunteer regiments saw a new regiment, the 5th Battalion King's Own Scottish Borderers, formed out of battalions from Dumfriesshire and Galloway.

The club entered the Scottish Cup from 1908 to 1915. The club won its way through the qualifying rounds to the competition proper on one occasion, in 1910–11, losing at Forfar Athletic in the first round proper before a crowd of 3,000.

The club inherited the Maxwelltown Volunteers position in local tournaments. It took part in the Scottish Combination from 1908 to 1910 to little effect. The club's only major success was winning the Southern Counties Cup, for teams in the south-west of Scotland, in 1915, beating St Cuthbert's Wanderers F.C. 2–1 in a replay at Dumfries F.C.'s Eastfield Park, the winner being scored by Potter with ten minutes to go.

=== Formation of Queen of the South ===
At the outbreak of the First World War, the rival Dumfries F.C. club was in financial difficulties. One of the Dumfries directors suggested amalgamating with the 5th K.O.S.B. in order to raise crowd levels.

During the war, the 5th K.O.S.B. was given permission to change its name to Palmerston F.C., suggesting the club was looking to widen its catchment, but it does not seem to have played under this name. The merger suggestion came back to life after the war concluded. On 21 March 1919, a public meeting was held in Dumfries Town Hall, with a view to forming a single club to represent the town, perhaps with a view to applying to join the Scottish League. At the meeting, representatives of three clubs in the town - the 5th KOSB, Dumfries, and the works side of the Arrol-Johnston car factory - agreed to merge into a new club, eventually named Queen of the South F.C., and the new club's first meeting took place a week later.

== Colours ==
The club played in blue shirts and white shorts.

== Ground ==
The club played at Palmerston Park.

== Honours ==
Southern Counties Cup

- Winners: 1914–15
