= Mid-Annandale F.C. (1877) =

Former association football club in Scotland

Mid-Annandale
- Full name: Mid-Annandale Football Club
- Nickname(s): the Mids, the Light Blues
- Founded: 1877
- Dissolved: 1894
- Ground: Livingston Place Park
- President: A. Rogerson
| 1877–87 colours | 1887–95 colours | Change colours |

Mid-Annandale F.C. was an association football club from Lockerbie in Dumfriesshire. The club was one of the more successful in the county in the 1880s and early 1890s, once reaching the final 16 of the Scottish Cup, but was wound up in December 1894.

== History ==
The club was founded in 1877. Its early years were played on the local stage, with its first competitive matches coming in the Churchill Cup, a competition aimed at clubs in Dumfriesshire, for a trophy donated by a Rev. Churchill of the Moffat club. The club entered for the first time in 1882–83, its first tie being a 2–1 win over East End Rovers of Dumfries. In 1883–84 the club was also invited to enter the Southern Counties Charity Cup, which was for a more select group of clubs.

=== First Churchill Cup success ===
The club's first success came in the Churchill Cup in 1886–87. In the first round, the club was drawn to play the 5th K.R.V., one of the two strongest sides in the region, and who had beaten the Mids 10–1 in the competition two years earlier. Mid-Annandale won 3–2. The Volunteers protested, but, after a 4–4 draw in the re-played tie on neutral territory at Milldamhead (the ground of Vale o' Nith), they failed to turn up for a replay, and the Mids were put through to the second round. In the semi-final, the club unexpectedly beat Queen of the South Wanderers 4–2, the match affected by a heavy wind which disturbed the Wanderers' passing game more than the Mids' dribbling game; a protest about the "partiality" of the referee (from Moffat) was dismissed. In the final, the Mids edged Vale o' Nith 4–3 in "magnificent" weather at Milldamhead, the Mids conceding two late goals to bring the score close.

It was the first of three successive Churchill Cup finals for the Mids. In 1887–88 the club lost to Moffat in a final that saw 21 goals; eight in the original match (said to be the "roughest on record") and 13 in the replay, which ended 7–6 to Moffat. In 1888–89 the club lost 4–2 to the 5th K.R.V. after a replay.

=== Suffering against the 5th K.R.V. ===
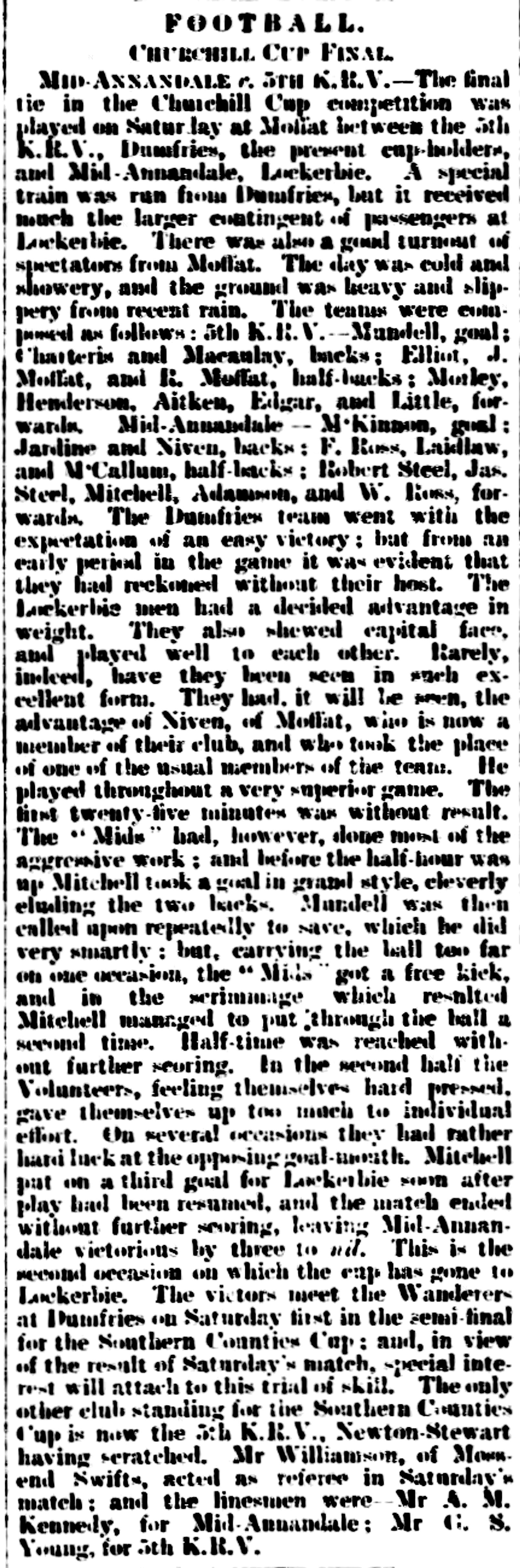
Churchill Cup Final 1892, Dumfries and Galloway Standard and Advertiser, 10 February 1892

The success encouraged the club to enter the Scottish Cup for the first time in 1888–89. In its first tie the club lost 3–1 at Vale o' Nith, after its best player James Mitchell had to leave the field through injury; in its second tie, in 1889–90, the club had the chance to gain revenge for its cup final defeat when drawn at home to the 5th K.R.V., but only two players (D.J. and F. Jardine) remained from the 1888–89 side. Reflecting the Lockerbie fans' hopes for success, there was greater support at the match for the visiting Volunteers; the "indifferently represented" Mids took a two-goal lead early on, but the 5th scored 5 goals before half-time, and ultimately won 11–3. The 5th also dealt a heavy defeat to the Mids in the final of the Charity Cup at the end of the season at Cresswell Park in Dumfries, this time 8–2, although by this time the Mids had recovered the previous season's players Ross, Laidlaw, Gardiner, and James Mitchell to their ranks; blame for the defeat was put on the "feeble resistance" offered by inexperienced goalkeeper M'Kinnon.

The Mids met the 5th again in the second round of the 1890–91 Scottish Cup; Mid-Annandale had recorded its record victory in the first round, hammering Rising Thistle of Lochmaben 16–1, but the Volunteers again came out on top, the game ending after 75 minutes with the score at 9–1 after Mundell left the pitch in protest at the refereeing; W. Mitchell, Robert Steel, and Ross having already done so, thus leaving the Mids with 7 men.

=== Second Churchill Cup success ===
1891–92 was arguably the club's greatest season, as the Scottish Football Association had introduced preliminary rounds in the Scottish Cup, and the Mids won through them for the only time to get to the first round proper - albeit the club only won one tie, as it was helped by two sides scratching and receiving a bye. The club's tie at that stage with the original Aberdeen club in 1891–92 was scheduled to be played at Duckburn Park in Dunblane but the referee postponed the tie because of a frozen pitch; the Mids, being "working fellows" and a "sturdy lot", offered to play regardless, which was declined by the "genteel" Aberdeen side of "clerks, teachers &c", and the sides nearly came to blows over the issue, much to the amusement of the locals. The rescheduled tie was eventually played at Stirling, a piqued Mid-Annandale won 6–2, Aberdeen protesting about "the rough play" of the Mids.

The second round proper, made up of 16 clubs, and the furthest the club would ever reach, saw Mid-Annandale drawn to play the Scottish League side Cowlairs away from home, and suffer an 11–2 defeat; the home side missed a penalty, but scored seven goals without reply in the second half, and one of the two Ross brothers was sent off with 10 minutes to go, his brother also leaving the pitch in sympathy. The club however had ample consolation in February when it won the Churchill Cup for a second time, finally gaining revenge over the 5th K.R.V. in the final with a 3–0 win, Mitchell scoring a hat-trick.

=== Collapse, re-start, and final end ===
It was the club's high point. Two months after the Churchill Cup final, the Mids met the 5th again in the Southern Counties Cup final; but this time, with centre-half Laidlaw replaced by the inexperienced Barnett, the Mids went down heavily to the Volunteers, with the first goal coming in under a minute, and the second from the penalty mark after 2. Yet again the Mids saw players leaving the pitch as a protest against the refereeing, this time after Mitchell was sent off for "kicking an opponent while lying on the ground", joined by the two Rosses and Richardson. The Volunteers also scored three times from penalties and ended up winning 9–1.

The club was in fact in serious financial difficulties. It did enter the 1892–93 Scottish Cup, but disbanded before the season started. However, at a "largely-attended" meeting at the Eastern Institute in Lockerbie on 2 September 1892, it was resolved to re-start the club, with the previous committee undertaking to clear the debts, and a new committee under honorary president James Jardine-Paterson was formed.

It was too late for the club to play in the Scottish Cup, but it did enter the Churchill Cup, reaching the semi-final. However the club retained its rough play and objections to refereeing decisions. When beating whipping boys Rising Thistle 14–0 at their Innerfield Park in the first round match, "the latter portion of the game was characterised by a display of roughness on the part of the visitors", with Mitchell being singled out for violence. In the semi-final, against Newton Stewart Athletic at Castle Douglas, and the score 3–2 to Athletic, Mitchell was sent off for rough play, and 6 of his team-mates walked off in sympathy. Despite the Mids being down to 4 men, the referee re-started the match, and Newton Stewart scored a fourth goal, with the four Mids players claiming offside.

The club did play out the 1892–93 season with friendlies, and only played friendlies in 1893–94. It returned to competitive football in the 1894–95 season, but lost in its first ties in the Scottish Cup (losing 2–1 at St Cuthbert Wanderers after Adamson of the Mids and Crossan of the Wanderers were sent off after a "too warm interchange of physical compliments"), and the Churchill Cup. The club's defeat to Maxwelltown Thistle - a club which would only play senior football that season - in the latter is the club's last recorded competitive match; in December 1894, after a scratch side beat Templand Wanderers, the club was disbanded. The coup de grâce was the Scottish FA striking the club from membership for non-payment of subscriptions before the 1895–96 season.

== Colours ==
The club's colours were light blue until 1887, and yellow (originally described as orange) and black striped shirts afterwards, with navy knickers. The club's change kit was dark blue and white stripes.

== Ground ==
The club played at Livingstone Place Park.

== Honours ==
- Churchill Cup:
  - Winners: 1886–87, 1891–92
  - Runners-up: 1887–88, 1888–89
- Southern Counties Cup:
  - Runners-up: 1891–92
- Southern Counties Charity Cup:
  - Runners-up: 1889–90
