= Dumfries Wanderers F.C. =

Former association football club in Scotland

Dumfries Wanderers
- Full name: Dumfries Wanderers Football Club
- Nickname(s): Queen's
- Founded: 1890
- Dissolved: 1894
- Ground: Cresswell Park
Home colours

Dumfries Wanderers F.C. was an association football club from Dumfries in Scotland.

== History ==
The club was founded under the name Leafield Swifts F.C. as a revival of the Queen of the South Wanderers F.C., which the Scottish Football Association had expelled for professionalism. At the start of the 1890–91 season, the club changed its name to Dumfries Wanderers F.C., and at the start of the 1891–92 season the Scottish FA allowed the club to revive Queen of the South Wanderers F.C. name.

The club's greatest national honour came as Dumfries Wanderers, reaching the 4th round (last 24) of the Scottish Cup in 1890–91.

The club was the first Scottish club to play Liverpool at Anfield in September 1892. That season, the Wanderers secured a treble of local cups, with victories in the Churchill Cup, the Southern Counties Challenge, and Charity Cups.

The team lost both finals of the Southern Counties' Cups in its last season of competition in 1893–94.

The club's final competitive match was a defeat to the 5th KRV in the Charity Cup final in May 1894. On 13 August 1894, the committee voted to dissolve the club. The reason was a combination of professionalism and difficulty in arranging fixtures since League football had been introduced.

The club has no connection to the modern football team called Queen of the South.

== Colours ==
The club's colours were navy and white stripes, with navy shorts.

== Ground ==
The club played originally at Cresswell Park, moving to the Recreation Grounds for the final seasons.

== Honours ==
Churchill Cup

- Winners: 1892–93

Southern Counties Charity Cup

- Winners: 1891–92, 1892–93
- Runners-up: 1893–94

Southern Counties Cup

- Winners: 1892–93
