= 5th Kirkcudbrightshire Rifle Volunteers F.C. =

Former association football club in Scotland

5th Kirkcudbrightshire Rifle Volunteers Football Club
- Full name: 5th Kirkcudbrightshire Rifle Volunteers Football Club
- Nicknames: the Warriors, the Volunteers
- Founded: 1879
- Dissolved: 1897
- Ground: Palmerston Park, Dumfries; 1879–1896
- League: South of Scotland Football League 1892–93
Home colours

The 5th Kirkcudbrightshire Rifle Volunteers Football Club was a football team based in Dumfries, Scotland.

== History ==
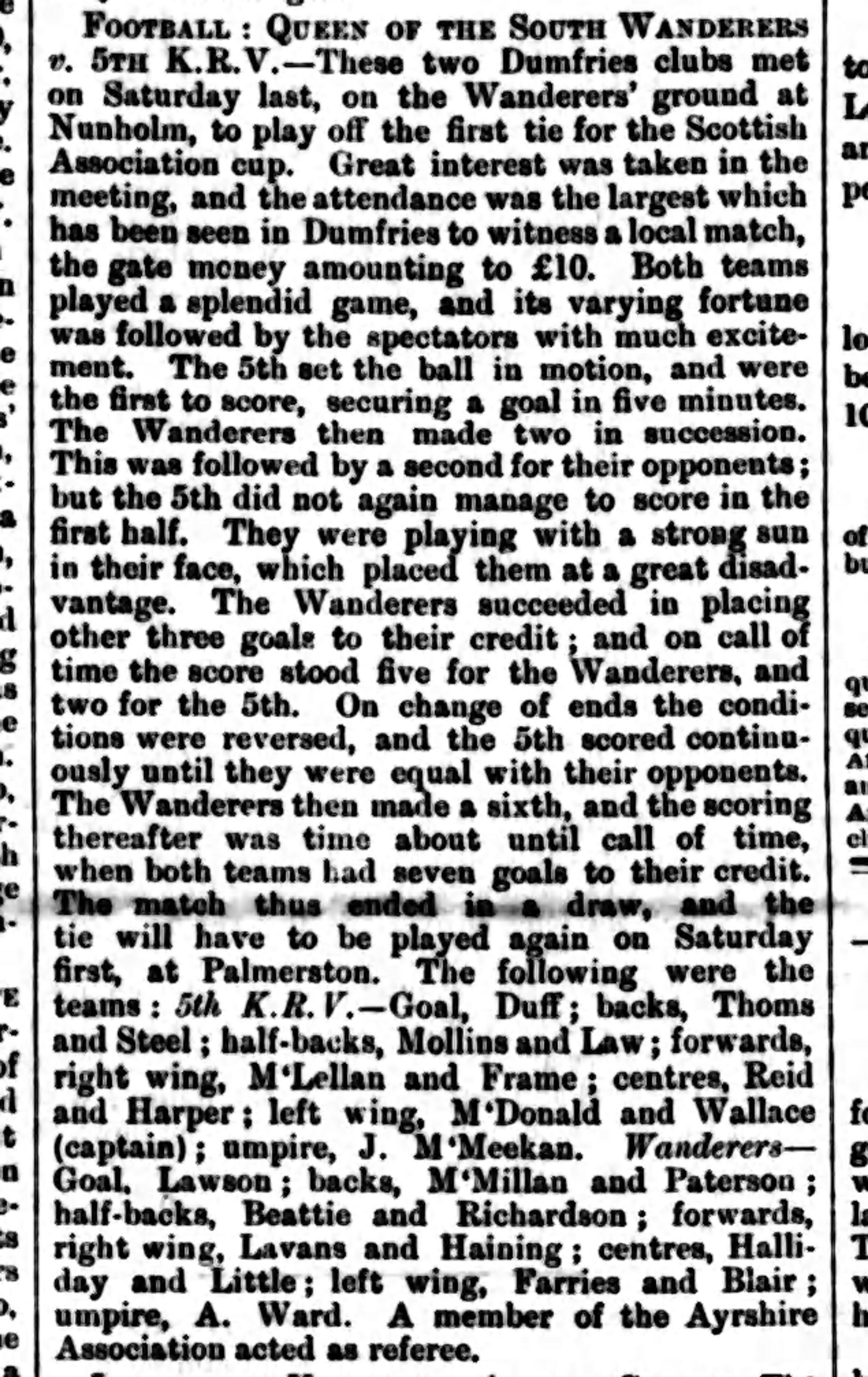
A report of the highest scoring draw in the Scottish Cup. QoS Wanderers v 5th KRV, Dumfries and Galloway Standard, Wed Sep 12 1883

The 5th Kirkcudbrightshire Rifle Volunteers were formed in 1860 in response to the increasing unrest within Continental Europe and the British Empire. Ultimately, eleven Companies were raised throughout Galloway and their services were accepted by Queen Victoria. The 5th KRV was based in Maxwelltown, Dumfries until the re-organisation of private militias in 1908 when all volunteer forces in Galloway were absorbed into the 5th King's Own Scottish Borderers Regiment.

The football club was founded in 1879, as a result of a quarrel within the membership of Queen of the South Wanderers, where many of its founder members were ex-Wanderers men. Its first competitive football was in the Scottish Cup in 1880–81. After a bye in the first round and a win over Stranraer F.C. in the second, the club played at Beith F.C. in the third round. After five minutes, the score was 1–1, but the K.R.V. conceded another five before half-time, and by the end of the match the score was 17–2.

The club's first success came in the Southern Counties Challenge Cup, also known as the Churchill Cup, after the Rev. Churchill, who donated a cup for clubs in Dumfries and Galloway to play for. The club played in the first edition of the tournament in 1881–82, and, after three drawn games with Newton Stewart F.C. in the final, the last one being a 3–3 draw in Moffat, the club shared the trophy.

The 5th joined the inaugural but ill-fated South of Scotland Football League for the 1892–93 season. Seven teams registered but the fixtures were never completed and the league folded in disarray.

However, the 5th were a very successful cup side winning all the local cup competitions on several occasions. They also played in every Scottish Cup from 1880–81 to 1894–95, except season 1891–92, and although they proved to be redoubtable battlers they were often knocked out by local rivals Queen of the South Wanderers, a team unconnected to the present Dumfries club. Their first-round tie against the Wanderers in 1883–84 ended in a 7–7 draw at Palmerston Park, having been 5–5 at half-time, a score line which remains the highest scoring draw in the history of the Scottish Cup.

The furthest the club reached in the Scottish Cup was the final 12 (fifth round) in 1890–91; after a frost caused the initial match at Dumbarton F.C. to be played as a friendly, the tie itself ended in an 8–0 win for the home side in a "pleasant and enjoyable game".

After a re-organisation of the volunteer forces in 1896, the club tendered its resignation to the Scottish Football Association at the end of the 1896–97 season, and a new football club, the Maxwelltown Volunteers F.C. emerged, continuing to play at Palmerston Park until 1908 when they re-formed as the 5th King's Own Scottish Borderers F.C.. After the troops returned from the First World War, the 5th KOSB joined forces with other local teams in the Dumfries area to form the current Scottish Football League club Queen of the South in 1919.

== Colours ==
The club's earliest strip was a suitably patriotic red and blue hooped shirts with white shorts and red socks, although this changed to blue shirts in 1883, which the club wore for the rest of its existence; the club wore white shorts from 1883 to 1885 and 1890 onwards, with navy shorts otherwise.

== Ground ==
The club played at its drill ground at Palmerston.

== Honours ==
Southern Counties Cup

- Winners: 1891–92, 1893–94

Churchill Cup

- Winners: 1881–82 (shared), 1883–84, 1888–89, 1890–91, 1893–94, 1894–95

Southern Counties Charity Cup

- Winners: 1883–84, 1889–90, 1890–91, 1893–94
