= Tulloch F.C. =

Association football club in Scotland

Tulloch
- Full name: Tulloch Football Club
- Nickname: the Villagers
- Founded: 1884
- Dissolved: 1921
- Ground: Tulloch Park
Home colours

Tulloch Football Club was an association football club from the village of Tulloch in Perthshire.

== History ==
The club was formed in 1884, William Pearson being elected as first club captain and James Paul as first club secretary. The club first played in the Perthshire Cup in the 1885–86 season, but struggled in its early years, on occasion going into abeyance due to the recruitment of its better players to better clubs, most notably Fair City Athletic, which persuaded the McLaren brothers, Barclay, Kinnoch, and Condie to switch allegiance in the 1880s and 1890s. It joined the Scottish Football Association in 1898, in time to play in the Scottish Qualifying Cup in 1898–99. In the same year, it was one of the seven smaller Perthshire clubs which agreed to form the Perthshire League, the club's secretary John Traill taking the pen at the league as well.

The club entered the Perthshire Cup every season from 1891–92 to 1920–21 (apart from 1896 to 1897), but only won one tie before 1904; indeed the club's 13–0 defeat to St Johnstone in the first round in 1887–88 remains the Saints' biggest win. It had a similar lack of success in the Qualifying Cup, never winning through to the first round of the Scottish Cup proper. The club was one round short of doing so on three occasions. The first was in 1902–03, when it beat Breadalbane and Duncrub Park for its first wins in the competition, but lost to Auchterarder Thistle in the third round, going down to a penalty and a goal with three minutes remaining; Thistle was drawn to play Rangers in the first round proper. The second occasion was 1906–07, a 3–1 defeat to Forfar Athletic ending the club's run in the third round; Tulloch was 2–0 down inside ten minutes and had Mailer in goal to thank for keeping the score reasonable. The final time (1913–14) was thanks to two byes before a heavy defeat to Alloa Athletic. The club gained a notable result in 1910–11 by holding St Johnstone to a draw in the first round, even earning a half-time lead, but lost the replay after centre-half Robinson had to withdraw from the tie due to a clashing cricket commitment.

It did however have success in the Perthshire League, winning the title four times before World War 1. The first occasion (in 1903–04) was after the club finished up its fixtures before closest rivals Duncrub Park, leaving Auld Dinnin' the task of forcing a championship play-off by winning the final two matches; however Park drew its last fixture with Stanley and Tulloch took its first trophy. The club's final title was in the final season before World War 1. It missed out on a double by losing to Stanley in the final of the Atholl Cup, it being fourth time lucky for Stanley, as Tulloch had three wins over it during the season.

Tulloch also won the first Perthshire Consolation Cup in 1905–06, for clubs eliminated from the county competition before the final, with a 2–1 win over Vale of Atholl. It successfully retained the trophy in 1906–07, beating Allanvale 2–0 in a replay, after drawing the original final at Crieff - a plan to play extra-time was scuppered by the Allanvale side needing to catch trains back to Blackford.

Its best runs in the main county cup came in 1906–07 and 1913–14, both times winning through to the semi-final, and both times suffering six goal defeats to St Johnstone. It was also a semi-finalist in 1920–21, but due to byes, as senior football in Perthshire was collapsing. Tulloch had scratched to Huntingtower in its Qualifying Cup tie that season and Tulloch's end was confirmed by it resigning its Scottish FA membership in August 1921.

== Colours ==
The club wore black and white jerseys.

== Ground ==
The club's ground was simply called Tulloch Park.

== Notable players ==
- Donald and Lawrence McLaren, father and uncle respectively of Sandy McLaren, both of whom played for the club in its first season; Sandy played for the Tulloch Juveniles side which outlived the senior side by a decade.

== Honours ==
- Perthshire League
  - Winner: 1903–04, 1905–06, 1911–12, 1913–14
  - Runner-up: 1904–05
- Perthshire Consolation Cup
  - Winner: 1905–06, 1906–07
- Atholl Cup
  - Runner-up: 1907–08, 1910–11, 1913–14
