= 1905–06 in Scottish football =

Football in Scotland
- Season: 1905–06

1905–06 in Scottish football

Division One champions
- Celtic

Division Two champions
- Leith Athletic

Scottish Cup winners
- Hearts

Junior Cup winners
- Dunipace

Scotland national team
- 1906 BHC

The 1905–06 season was the 33rd season of competitive football in Scotland and the 16th season of the Scottish Football League.

== League competitions ==
=== Scottish League Division One ===
Pos	Team	Pld	W	D	L	GF	GA	GD	Pts	Qualification or relegation
1	Celtic (C)	30	24	1	5	76	19	+57	49	Champions
2	Heart of Midlothian	30	18	7	5	64	27	+37	43	
3	Airdrieonians	30	15	8	7	53	31	+22	38	
4	Rangers	30	15	7	8	58	48	+10	37	
5	Partick Thistle	30	15	6	9	44	40	+4	36	
6	Third Lanark	30	16	2	12	62	38	+24	34	
7	Dundee	30	11	12	7	40	33	+7	34	
8	St Mirren	30	13	5	12	41	37	+4	31	
9	Morton	30	10	6	14	35	54	−19	26	
10	Motherwell	30	9	8	13	50	64	−14	26	
11	Hibernian	30	10	5	15	35	40	−5	25	
12	Aberdeen	30	8	8	14	37	49	−12	24	
13	Falkirk	30	9	5	16	53	69	−16	23	
14	Port Glasgow Athletic	30	6	8	16	38	68	−30	20	
15	Kilmarnock	30	8	4	18	46	68	−22	20	
16	Queen's Park	30	5	4	21	41	88	−47	14	

Source: "1905-1906 Division 1 - SPFL Archive". SPFL.
(C) Champions

Champions: Celtic

=== Scottish League Division Two ===
Pos	Team	Pld	W	D	L	GF	GA	GD	Pts	Promotion or relegation
1	Leith Athletic (C)	22	15	4	3	46	22	+24	34	
2	Clyde (P)	22	11	9	2	37	21	+16	31	Promoted to the 1906–07 Scottish Division One
3	Albion Rovers	22	12	3	7	48	31	+17	27	
4	Hamilton Academical (P)	22	12	2	8	45	33	+12	26	Promoted to the 1906–07 Scottish Division One
5	Arthurlie	22	10	2	10	46	46	0	22	
5	St Bernard's	22	9	4	9	42	34	+8	22	
7	Ayr	22	9	3	10	44	51	−7	21	
8	Raith Rovers	22	6	7	9	36	42	−6	19	
9	Abercorn	22	6	5	11	31	46	−15	17	
9	Cowdenbeath	22	7	3	12	28	40	−12	17	
11	Vale of Leven	22	6	4	12	33	49	−16	16	
12	East Stirlingshire	22	1	10	11	26	47	−21	12	

Source: statto.com
Rules for classification: Teams finish equal if level on points. Points system: 2 points for a win, 1 point for a draw, 0 points for a loss
(C) Champions; (P) Promoted

Next season there are eighteen teams in Division One and twelve teams in Division Two.

== Other honours ==
=== Cup honours ===
==== National ====
Competition	Winner	Score	Runner-up
Scottish Cup	Hearts	1 – 0	Third Lanark
Scottish Qualifying Cup	Leith Athletic	2 – 0	Beith
Scottish Junior Cup	Dunipace	1 – 0	Rob Roy

==== County ====
Competition	Winner	Score	Runner-up
Aberdeenshire Cup	Peterhead	4 – 2	Huntly
Ayrshire Cup	Ayr	1 – 0	Ayr Parkhouse
Border Cup	Selkirk	w.o. (Note: Match awarded as a walkover.)	Vale of Leithen
Dumbartonshire Cup	Vale of Leven	1 – 0	Dumbarton
East of Scotland Shield	Hearts	2 – 1 (Note: Replay needed.)	Hibernian
Fife Cup	Raith Rovers	2 – 0	Cowdenbeath
Forfarshire Cup	Forfar Athletic	2 – 1	Arbroath
Glasgow Cup	Celtic	3 – 0	Third Lanark
Lanarkshire Cup	Hamilton	2 – 1	Airdrie
Linlithgowshire Cup	Bathgate	4 – 2	Bo'ness
North of Scotland Cup	Clachnacuddin	2 – 1 (Note: Second replay needed.)	Inverness Caledonian
Perthshire Cup	Dunblane	7 – 2	St Johnstone
Renfrewshire Cup	Morton	4 – 3 (Note: Play off needed.)	Arthurlie
Southern Counties Cup	Dumfries	2 – 0	Nithsdale Wanderers
Stirlingshire Cup	Falkirk	3 – 2	Alloa Athletic

=== Non-league honours ===
Highland League

Top Three
Pos	Team	Pld	W	D	L	GF	GA	GD	Pts
1	Clachnacuddin (Note: Finished first after a playoff.)	12	7	2	3	22	17	+5	16
2	Inverness Caledonian	12	7	2	3	31	9	+22	16
3	Inverness Thistle	12	6	4	2	28	11	+17	16

Source: SFHA

Other Senior Leagues

Division	Winner
Border Senior League	Gala Hailes Villa
Eastern League	Hearts 'A'
Northern League	Aberdeen 'A'
Perthshire League	Tulloch
Scottish Alliance	Hearts 'A'
Scottish Combination	Dumbarton

== Scotland national team ==
Scotland were joint winners of the 1906 British Home Championship with England.

Date	Venue	Opponents	Score (Note: Scotland's score is shown first.)	Competition	Scotland scorer(s)
3 March 1906	Tynecastle Park, Edinburgh (H)	Wales	0–2	BHC	
17 March 1906	Dalymount Park, Dublin (A)	Ireland	1–0	BHC	Thomas Fitchie
7 April 1906	Hampden Park, Glasgow (H)	England	2–1	BHC	James Howie (2)

Key:

- (H) = Home match
- (A) = Away match
- BHC = British Home Championship

Team	Pld	W	D	L	GF	GA	GD	Pts
England (C)	3	2	0	1	7	2	+5	4
Scotland (C)	3	2	0	1	3	3	0	4
Wales	3	1	1	1	6	5	+1	3
Ireland	3	0	1	2	4	10	−6	1

Rules for classification: 1) points. The points system worked as follows: 2 points for a win and 1 point for a draw.
(C) Co-champions

== Other national teams ==
=== Scottish League XI ===
Date	Venue	Opponents	Score (Note: Scottish League XI's score is shown first.)	Scotland scorer(s)
24 March 1906	Stamford Bridge, London (A)	(England) Football League XI	2–6	Archie Kyle, Charles Thomson

== See also ==
- 1905–06 Aberdeen F.C. season
- 1905–06 Rangers F.C. season
