= Duncrub Park F.C. =

Association football club in Scotland

Duncrub Park
- Full name: Duncrub Park Football Club
- Nicknames: Auld Dinnin', the Thorntree Villagers, the Lowlanders
- Founded: 1885
- Dissolved: 1910
- Ground: Croft Park
- Secretary: Harry Christie
Home colours

Duncrub Park Football Club was a football club from the village of Dunning, Perthshire, Scotland.

== History ==
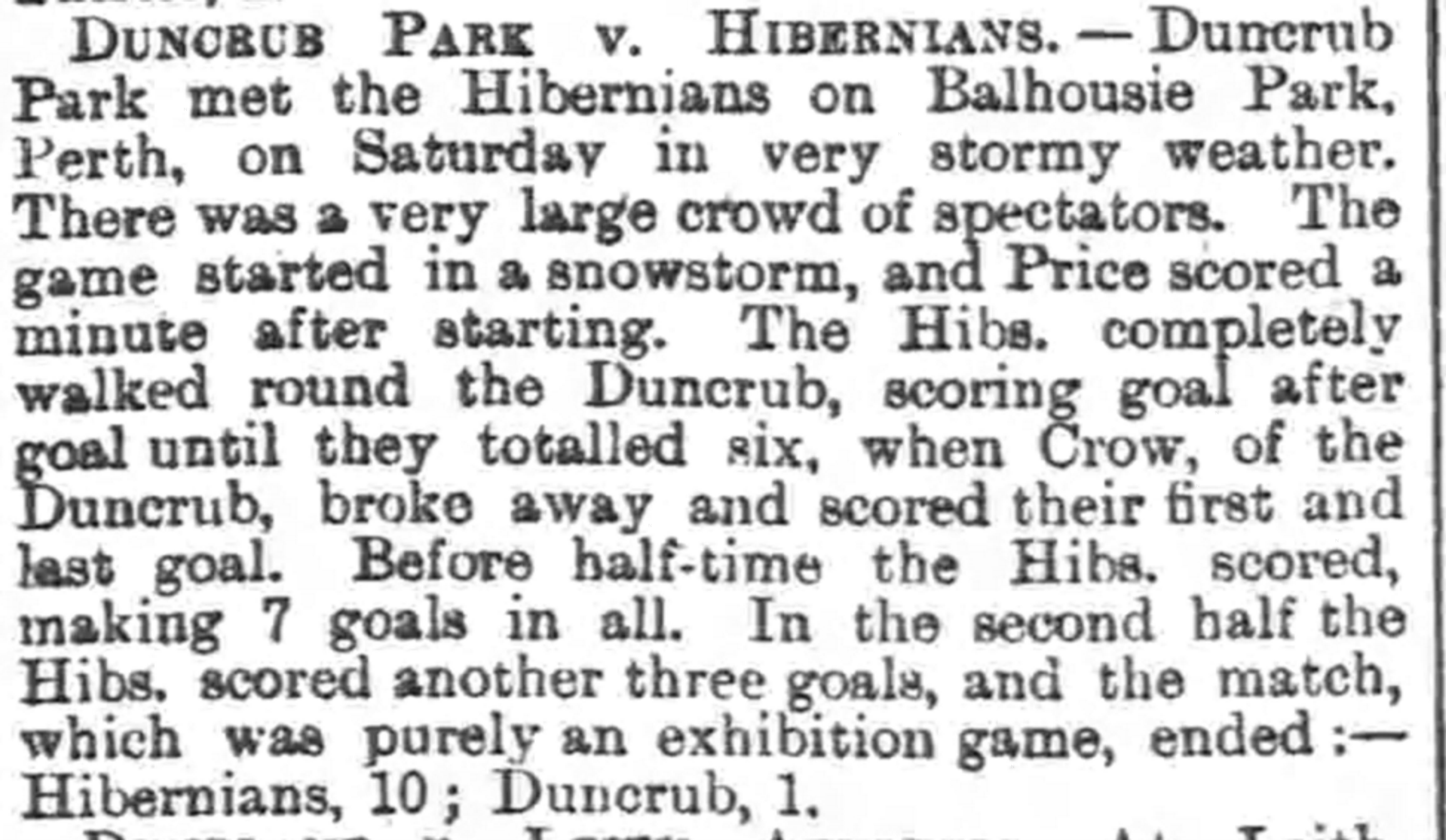
Report of the Scottish Cup First Round tie between Duncrub Park and Hibernian, Dundee Courier, 11 January 1897

A version of 'mob' football first took place in the village from around 1747 to the 1850s. The impetus for a modern association club came from the local nobility, with the Honourables Eric and Herbert Rollo, Percy Parminter (the son of Lord Rollo's private chaplain), and other local notables forming a club for the younger men in the village. The club took its name from the Rollo family's Duncrub Park estate and house next to which the village was situated. The first recorded matches for the club are from the 1885–86 season.

=== Cup competitions ===
The club's first Scottish Cup entry was in 1894–95. This was after the Scottish Football Association required qualification via preliminary rounds and, from 1895, via the Scottish Qualifying Cup. The club's first tie was at Fair City Athletic in Perth, and ended 5–3 to the home side, with Duncrub being outclassed, but kept in the game thanks to "two of the softest goals to be scored that have been witnessed on Balhousie Park".

The club entered every year afterwards until 1907–08. It won through to the first round proper once - in 1896–97, thanks to a 6–0 win over Vale of Atholl (in a replay at Pitlochry, after the original home tie ended 2–2), 7–2 away to Huntingtower, and a bye. In the fourth round of the Qualifying Cup, the club was beaten 10–1 by Inverness Thistle, but by reaching that stage the club had ensured a place in the competition proper. The club was drawn at home to Hibernian, and arranged to host the tie in at Fair City's Balhousie Park. Unsurprisingly, the amateur club was outclassed, conceding within a minute of the start and going down 10–1.

Other than 1896–97, the club only won 3 ties, the most remarkable result being a 4–1 win over Dunblane in 1903–04.

The club had a similar lack of success in the leading local cup competition, the Perthshire Cup. Auld Dinnin' first entered in 1891, but did not win a tie until 1895–96, and even then its opponent (Vale of Ruthven) was reduced to 10 men after 7 minutes, and 9 men for the second half, through injuries. An 11–1 defeat to St Johnstone in 1899 was so bad that the club postponed a following friendly on the basis that the club "got as much football in Perth on Saturday as will serve them for a long time". Duncrub did not win in the competition again until 1904 and only ever won three other ties in the tournament, all against the Black Watch side.

=== Perthshire League ===
In 1898, the club was one of the seven smaller Perthshire clubs to agree to form the Perthshire League. Having helped to set up the League, the club then decided not to take part; it finally made its league bow in 1901–02, and with 2 games remaining required either a win over the Stanley club, or a draw against Stanley and avoiding defeat against Scone. Three of the seven clubs had withdrawn from the competition during the season, and the League prevaricated over whether to expunge the fixtures or give 2 points to the surviving clubs for all unplayed fixtures. Duncrub lost both matches; a protest against Stanley on the basis of spectator encroachment causing the game to be finished 10 minutes early, one of the Stanley goals having not passed between the posts, and Stanley had fielded an unregistered player was dismissed and Stanley was declared champion.

It was the closest Duncrub came to winning the title again. Duncrub withdrew from the league near the end of the 1905–06 season, having not played a home match after October 1905 owing to "a mismanagement regarding the remaining fixtures" to be played in Dunning.

=== End of the club ===
The club's last entry to the Perthshire Cup was in 1909–10, and, after losing to Huntingtower in the second round, the club did not take part in the Perthshire Consolation Cup for teams which had been knocked out of the main competition (the competition had been the idea of the club's Harry Christie). The last recorded match for the club was against a side of former players, as a benefit match for three "veterans" who were emigrating.

== Colours ==
The club's colours were as follows:

- 1894–95: blue and white
- 1895–97: white
- 1897 onwards: black and white

== Ground ==
The club's pitch was in or around Duncrub Park, and was described as Croft Park, the Games Park, Cow-feeders Park, and Crofts Park. The ground's facilities seem to have been non-existent as no ground is marked out on the contemporary Ordnance Survey maps, and Dundee Wanderers F.C. complained that the club did not have a private ground.
