= Rob Roy F.C. =

Association football club in Scotland

Rob Roy
- Full name: Rob Roy Football Club
- Nickname(s): the Gregarachs, the Macgregors/McGregors, the Highlanders
- Founded: 1878
- Dissolved: 1900
- Ground: Garmhor Park
- Secretary: John Page, John Miller
Home colours

Rob Roy Football Club was a football club from Callander in Scotland.

== History ==
Callander has had an ancient form of mob football, played at the Roman camp, since at least the early 19th century. The match was traditionally played on Hansel Monday, the first day of the New Year, and one Callander man, John Burns Connell, took a Hansel Monday ball to Glasgow in the 1860s to rent out for matches at Glasgow Green; Burns was later a player for the Thistle club, the Callander club made of up former Thistle players, and the Eastern F.C. club.

The first association match recorded in Callander was the 1877–78 Scottish Cup second round tie between Grasshoppers and Clifton & Strathfillan, held at the Roman Camp, and which drew a large crowd. The association club was founded in 1878, taking its name from Rob Roy MacGregor. The club's first recorded match was against the Partick Ramblers club in March that year.

In 1878–79 it entered the Scottish Cup for the first time, beating Coupar Angus after a match of "give and take" character at the North Inch in Perth. After a win over the Vale of Teith and a bye, the club lost 9–0, plus one disputed goal, to Hibernian at Powderhall in the fourth round.

The following season saw the club's best Cup run. Rob Roy again beat Coupar Angus in the first round, albeit this time because Coupar Angus was handicapped by an early collision between Macfarlane (playing for the match in goal) and "goal watcher" William Davidson, which saw the latter taken off the field and the former continuing while injured. Rob Roy went all the way to the fifth round, made up of 13 clubs, being piped to the Crown Hotel in Callander after beating Johnstone Athletic F.C. 4–2 in the fourth round; in the fifth however the club lost 12–0 at Thornliebank, who reached the competition's final, the Gregarachs unable to adapt their long-kicking style against a more 'scientific' side.

After the 1881–82 Scottish Cup, the club fell into abeyance for two years, but came back in 1883. The club had not been helped by apathy in the town, but made a comeback to senior football in 1888, by entering the Perthshire Cup, and beating Vale of Ruthven 10–0 in the first round; Rob Roy offered the Auchterarder club a choice of half of the gate or a tea supper after the match - the visitors chose the money, "and left by the first train, having no doubt got enough of Callander". In the second round the Gregarachs lost heavily against Erin Rovers.

The club was seemingly abandoned after the season, but in November 1889, the former members held a meeting, and decided to re-start the club, albeit too late to enter any competitions for the season. Rob Roy therefore entered the Perthshire Cup again from 1890 onwards; it was outclassed in most of its entries, but reached the final in 1897–98, with one of the matches being a "great surprise" 4–0 victory against St Johnstone, thanks to long ball tactics on a heavy pitch, and two breakaway goals in the second half. St Johnstone protested after the match, on the basis that four of the Rob Roy players (Lynch, Harding, and Abbot of Glasgow, and Honeyman of Dunblane) were not bona fide club members. The protest was dismissed for not having been made in advance, despite St Johnstone pointing out that it could not possibly have made a protest before knowing who the players were, and Mr M'Callum of the Alyth F.C. club supporting the protest on the basis that the tournament rules were "a conglomeration of insensible ideas".

In the final, Rob Roy faced the county town side Fair City Athletics F.C. at Recreation Park; the Perthshire FA awarded Rob Roy £3 10/ in expenses to pay for 14 train fares. Rob Roy came from 3–1 down in the original match to force a replay. For the second match, at the same venue, the Athletics changed at the Waverley Park hotel, and, en route, their brake lost a wheel and overturned, but fortunately none of the players was seriously injured, and the Athletics won 3–2.

Rob Roy started to re-enter the Scottish Cup in 1894–95, by which time qualifying rounds had been introduced, and from 1895–96 the Scottish Qualifying Cup. The club never made the first round proper again. Its last entry to the Qualifying Cup was in 1898–99, when, in front of a "meagre" attendance at home, the club lost 5–0 to Vale of Atholl, and it lost 6–2 at Fair City Athletics in the first round of the Perthshire Cup. Despite reports that the club was scouting for players in Glasgow and Dundee, the defeats and low crowd seem to have led to Rob Roy being wound up, as there is no further record of the club playing; the last mention of Rob Roy is of the club's representative Gregor McGregor acting as a referee in a friendly at the end of 1899.

== Colours ==
The club described its colours red and black hoops, with navy shorts. For the Scottish Cup tie at Arbroath in 1880, the jerseys were described as Rob Roy tartan, which is red with black cross-stripes.

From 1895 they were white shirts with "dark" (probably navy) shorts.

== Ground ==
The club played at Garmhor Park, in the east of Callander, 300 yards from the railway station, and described as "a park near the goods station", which was at the east end of the village.

In 1889, the club secured a new ground, called Station Park; its location is uncertain, but, given the club's secretary John Miller was the stationmaster, it could have been close to the passenger station, by the curling pond.

== Notable players ==
- David Henderson, later of Liverpool F.C.
- Andrew Hannah, who joined the club in 1895 on "nil" terms, in order to comply with the rules on professionals

== Honours ==
- Scottish Cup
  - Best performance: 4th round, 1879–80
- Perthshire Cup
  - Runner-up: 1897–98
