= Auchterarder Thistle F.C. =

Association football club in Scotland

Auchterarder Thistle
- Full name: Auchterarder Thistle Football Club
- Nickname(s): Thistle, the Lang Toon
- Founded: 1897
- Dissolved: 1908
- Ground: Public Park
- Hon. President: W. L. Young
- Secretary: James S. Porter, Angus Grant
Home colours

Auchterarder Thistle Football Club was a football club from the village of Auchterarder, Perthshire, Scotland.

== History ==
The club was founded before the 1897–98 season as a "third-class club" replacement for Vale of Ruthven F.C., the village's senior club which had been dissolved. The club applied to play in the Perth City and County League in 1900, but was turned down. However, before the season started the club was admitted to membership of the Scottish Football Association, making the club a senior club.

The club therefore entered the Scottish Qualifying Cup for 1900–01, and was drawn away at Tulloch F.C.,; Thistle won the tie 10–1. The club lost in the third round to St Johnstone.

Thistle's best run in the Qualifying Cup was in 1902–03. Fair City Athletics withdrew in the first round, the Thistle had a bye in the second, and beat Tulloch in the third. By reaching the fourth round - in which the club lost 5–4 to St Johnstone - the club was entitled to enter the Scottish Cup proper for the first time; the club was drawn at home to Rangers. Rangers paid the club £20 to switch the tie to Ibrox Park, with the support of the players who wanted to play on the "classic sward"; the side included a saddler (Helm Eadie), a blacksmith (Jimmy Isaac), a bootmaker (James Mallis), and a painter (Jock Edwards), as well as some players borrowed from Dunblane. Rangers - who would go on to win the Cup that season - won 7–0. R. C. Hamilton, man-marked out of the game by Isaac and unable to score, generously praised the Thistle players for their skills.

On a local level, the club reached the Perthshire Cup final in 1900–01, but lost to Dunblane in the final at St Johnstone's Recreation Park; the Lang Toon went behind after five minutes, and was 3–0 down early in the second half, but two Mallis goals brought the score back to 3–2, before Dunblane made the game safe with the final goal of the game.

The club's J. Smith was President of the Perthshire Football Association in 1907–08, and the club entered the Perthshire Cup, but not the Qualifying Cup, and there is no record of the club after the season's end.

== Colours ==
The club's colours were originally the same black and white as Vale of Ruthven's, but from 1901 they were red and white.

== Ground ==
The club played at the Auchterarder Public Park.

== Notable players ==
- Peter Arnott, who later played for St Johnstone
