= Dunkeld & Birnam F.C. =

Association football club in Renfrewshire, Scotland

Dunkeld & Birnam
- Full name: Dunkeld & Birnam F.C.
- Founded: 1903
- Dissolved: 1952
- Ground: Inverlock
- Match Secretary: Bruce Reid
1903–05, 1906–20 colours	1920–47 colours

Dunkeld and Birnam F.C. was an association football club from Dunkeld, in Perthshire.

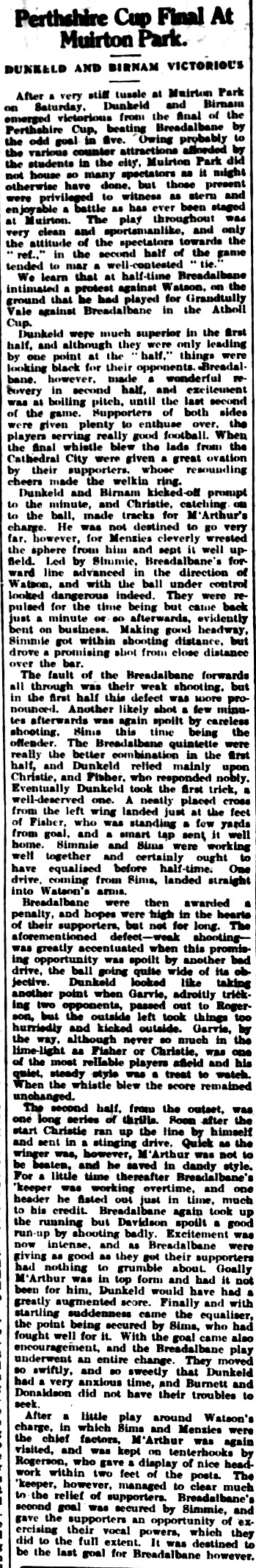
1924–25 Perthshire Cup final, Dunkeld & Birnam 3–2 Breadalbane, Perthshire Advertiser, 8 April 1925

== History ==
=== Dunkeld F.C. ===
The club was founded in 1903 as Dunkeld F.C., after the demise of the previous Dunkeld & Birnam club seven years earlier. It joined the Perthshire Football Association in September and entered the Perthshire Cup, "the new advents" beaten in the first round at Tulloch.

The club's record in the competition was initially appalling, not winning a tie until 1919–20. Dunkeld did win the low-grade the Atholl League in 1904–05, beating Breadalbane in a playoff at Pitlochry, after both clubs won 4 and lost 2 of their six league matches. Jackson scored the only goal of the game.

=== Name change ===
After the First World War, the club changed its name to Dunkeld & Birnam F.C., and joined the Perthshire League. The club improved to the extent that it was top of the League in 1923–24 when the League ground to a halt, albeit in part by virtue of playing the most matches; the Perthshire FA eventually awarded the title to the club, Dunkeld becoming champions with a negative goal difference.

Another sign of the club's improvement was its reaching the first round of the 1923–24 Scottish Cup. The club entered the Scottish Qualifying Cup during the 1904–05 season (with a hiatus in the late 1900s) but had previously never managed to get far enough to gain entry to the national competition; a protest about a 2–1 defeat at Blairgowrie Amateurs in the second round in 1921–22 was dismissed as having arrived at the Scottish FA 10 minutes too late. However, in 1923–24, a win at Huntingtower, and a bye, put the club in the third round of the Qualifying Cup. Although it lost at that stage to Coldstream the club had at least qualified for the Cup itself. The reward was a home tie with Partick Thistle in the first round, but Dunkeld & Birnam sold the home advantage, and an 8,000 crowd saw Thistle cruise home 11–0, Sandy Hair scoring a double hat-trick.

The following season, Dunkeld & Birnam won the Perthshire Cup for the only time, beating Breadalbane 4–2 in the final at Muirton Park (a Breadalbane protest over the eligibility of goalkeeper Watson being dismissed), and the Consolation Cup in 1925–26. The club also reached the first round of the 1928–29 Scottish Cup, albeit thanks to a walkover and a bye. In the third round of the Qualifying Cup, the club lost at Berwick Rangers, a low crowd being blamed on the match being played at harvest time. In the first round of the Cup itself, the club had an easier draw than before, at home to Clackmannan. However, after the game had to be postponed twice because of bad weather, Dunkeld & Birnam scratched, unable to bring the team together a third time.

=== Suspension ===
The match with Berwick though had disastrous consequences for the club. Dundee Violet protested that two players, George Dargie and James Robertson, had, with the connivance of Bruce Reid of Dunkeld, played in the game under false names. The Scottish FA's verdict was brutal - the club was suspended to the end of the season and find £25, and Dargie, Robertson, Reid, and three other players (who had withheld evidence) were given permanent suspensions from the game. The Scottish FA gave an appeal short shrift.

The club never won a Perthshire Cup tie again; it entered the Qualifying Cup until 1938–39 but did not win through to the Cup itself. It did not recover after the Second World War either, losing its ground to the A.E.C. in 1947, thus being thrown off the Scottish FA membership roll, and resigning from the Perthshire League. It tried to secure a home at Birnam Public Park, but the struggle for a ground hastened the club's demise. It arranged to play on a field adjoining the Recreation Grounds in 1952, but it does not seem to have played for long afterwards.

== Colours ==
The club wore blue shirts with a yellow sash until 1920, other than playing in primrose and pink shirts in 1905–06. After 1920 the club's colours were black and gold.

== Ground ==
The club played at Inverlock.

== Notable players ==
- Alf Gittins, player for (amongst others) Partick Thistle, who finished his career at Dunkeld & Birnam, playing in the Cup defeat at Firhill as a 39 year old
