= Vale of Ruthven F.C. =

Association football club in Scotland

Vale of Ruthven
- Nickname(s): the Vale
- Founded: 1886
- Dissolved: 1897
- Ground: Auchterarder Public School Park
- Secretary: James Cairns
Home colours

The Vale of Ruthven Football Club was a football club from the village of Auchterarder, Perthshire, Scotland.

== History ==
The club was from the village of Auchterarder, Perthshire, and the first game recorded for the club is a defeat for ts second XI at Crieff in December 1886.

The club's competitive debut came in the 1888–89 Perthshire Cup, at Rob Roy of Callander, and ended in a 10–0 defeat. Given a choice of half of the gate money or a supper laid on by the Gregarachs, the Vale "and left by the first train, having no doubt got enough of Callander".

The Vale entered the Perthshire Cup every year until 1896–97, winning more than one tie only in 1893–94; a revenge 4–1 win over Rob Roy, and a 4–1 win over Tulloch. In the semi-final, the club was drawn to play St Johnstone at the latter's Recreation Park. The Vale was considered "a comparatively easy nut to crack", and, as rains had rendered the ground unfit to host a cup tie, the clubs played out a friendly; the Vale managed a 2–2 draw. The same thing happened with the arranged replay, only the Saints this time winning 8–2, and, after several postponements, the tie finally took place on 17 March. The Vale held out for ten minutes, before St Johnstone ran rampant, and won 10–1.

By joining the Scottish Football Association in 1891, the Vale was eligible to try to play in the Scottish Cup. The club entered the preliminary rounds until the introduction of the Scottish Qualifying Cup in 1895, and then entered that competition for its first two seasons. However the club never reached the first round proper; indeed, the only match the club did not lose was a 3–3 draw with Strathmore Athletic in 1892–93, Athletic winning the replay 4–0. Both ties were held in Auchterarder, as Strathmore's new Hillside ground was not yet ready, and the club was having to play at Dundee Harp. The club's final match in the competition was a 13–1 defeat at Dunblane.

The club was wound up in 1897, and a new club, Auchterarder Thistle, formed to fill the vacuum.

== Colours ==
The club wore black and white jerseys and white knickers.

== Ground ==
The club originally played on the Public Park in Auchterarder, but obtained the use of the Auchterarder Public School Park (previously used by Our Boys (Auchterarder)) from 1890.

== Notable players ==
- Claude Lambie, who played for the club briefly in November 1891
