= Our Boys F.C. (Blairgowrie) =

Association football club in Renfrewshire, Scotland

Our Boys (Blairgowrie)
- Full name: Our Boys Football Club (Blairgowrie)
- Nickname: the Boys
- Founded: 1882
- Dissolved: 1912
- Ground: The Beeches, Foundry Park
- President: Bob Low
1885–92, 1895–98 colours	1898–1912 colours

Our Boys (Blairgowrie), also known as Blairgowrie Our Boys, was a football club from Blairgowrie in Perthshire, Scotland.

== History ==
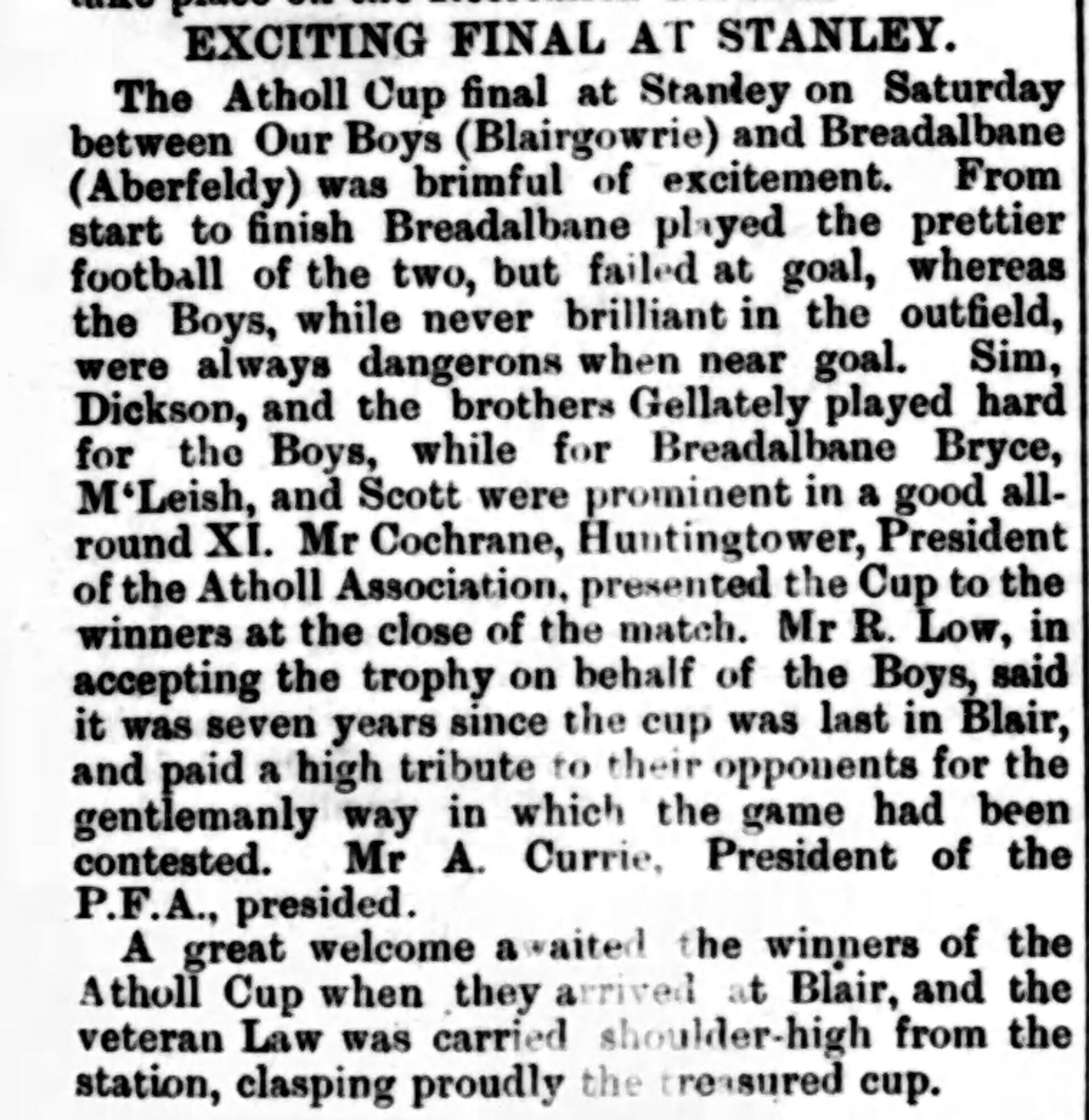
1908–09 Atholl Cup Final. Our Boys (Blairgowrie) 3–2 Breadalbane (Aberfeldy). Perthshire Advertiser, 28 April 1909

The club was founded in 1882. It took part in the first Perthshire Cup in 1884–85, losing at home in the first round to Coupar Angus by 2 goals to 1, the visitors coming from behind to win the match with a scrimmage after a handball close to goal. Our Boys' joint best run in the competition came in its second season, beating St Johnstone in the first round (after a protest about the eligibility of some of the Saints) and Guildtown Wanderers by 11–0 in the second. That earned the club a semi-final tie, the opponents again being Coupar Angus, and Our Boys went down 7–1.

The club did not equal this run until 1910–11, when it lost 3–1 at Crieff Morrisonians in the semi-final. It did however win the Consolation Cup, for clubs eliminated before the main final, in 1907–08 by beating Vale of Atholl in the consolation final. It was the start of a mini-golden age for the club; it won the Atholl Cup, for the smaller clubs in Perthshire, in the next two seasons, the only times it ever lifted that particular trophy.

Our Boys joined the Scottish Football Association in 1886, and took part in the Scottish Cup thereafter. Until 1891–92, there was no qualification process, so Our Boys was entered into the first round proper; the club scratched rather than have to face the long journey to Oban in 1886–87, and in the following three seasons the club lost in the first round every time, its first tie being a 9–2 defeat at Coupar Angus in 1887–88.

The club continued to enter the preliminary rounds, and from 1895 the Scottish Qualifying Cup, until 1911–12 (apart from a hiatus in the early 1900s), but did not make the first round proper again. The club did at least finally beat Coupar Angus, in 1892–93, but it was one of only four wins in the competition.

The club was invited to join the Northern League in 1909, but did not do so; it finally disbanded in 1912, to be replaced shortly afterwards by Blairgowrie Amateurs. The name was used for a juvenile team in the 1920s and 1930s.

== Colours ==
The club played in the following colours:

- 1882–85: blue and yellow halved shirts (described as quarters) and blue (serge) knickers
- 1885–92: white
- 1892–93: red and white
- 1893–95: royal blue
- 1895–98: white
- 1898–1912: black and white

== Ground ==
The club's ground originally was the Beeches, on the Perth Road; the ground was also known as Loonbrae.

In 1892 the club moved to the Lower Haughs and in 1896 to Foundry Park.
