= Erin Rovers F.C. (Perth) =

Association football club in Scotland

Erin Rovers
- Full name: Erin Rovers Football Club
- Nicknames: the Rovers, the Celts
- Founded: 1884
- Dissolved: 1889
- Ground: St Catherine's Park
- President: Rev. Father Turner
Home colours

Erin Rovers Football Club was a football club from the town of Perth, Scotland.

== History ==
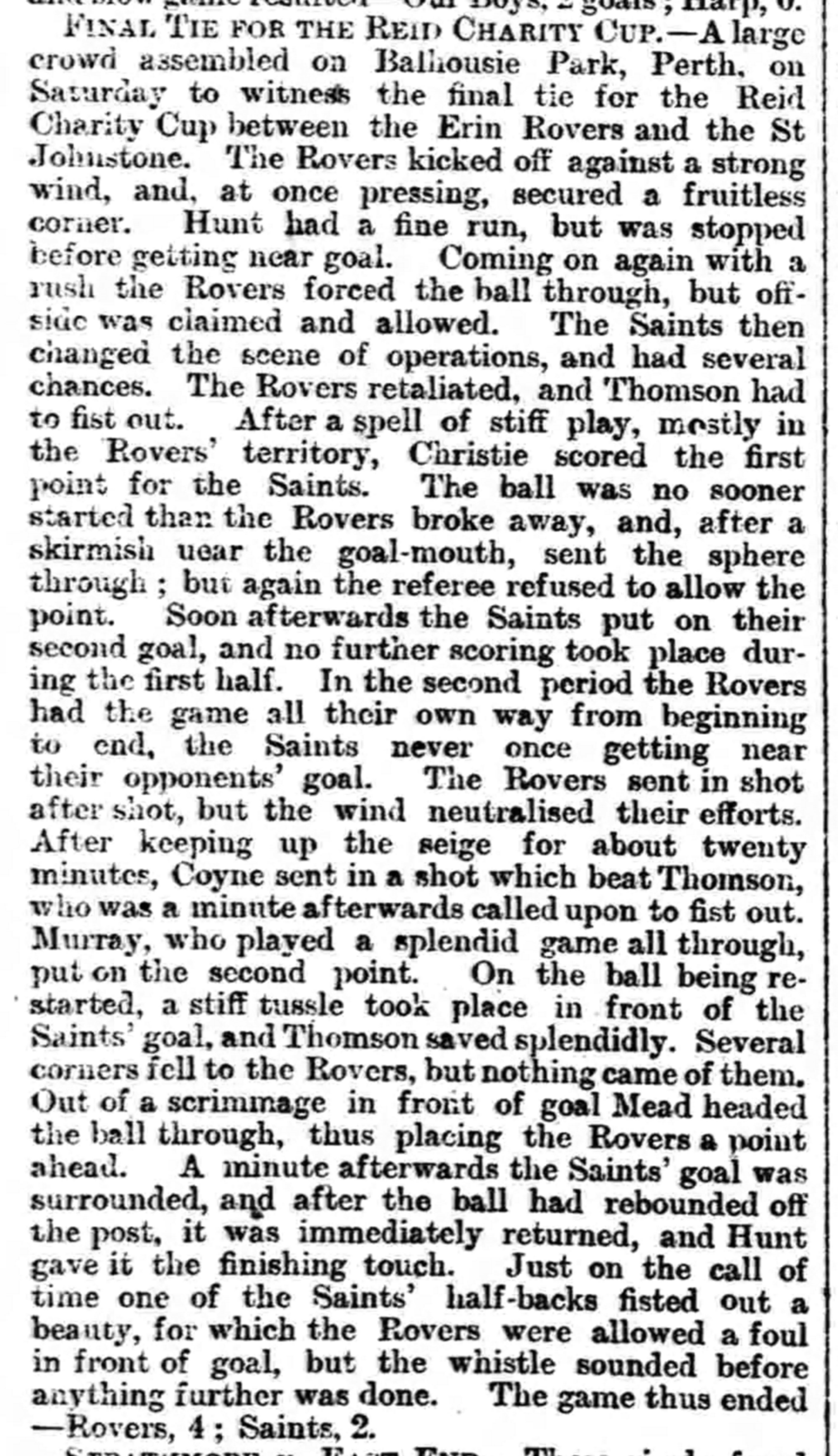
Reid Cup Final 1888–89: Erin Rovers 4–2 St Johnstone, Dundee Courier, 7 May 1888

The club was formed in 1884 and its earliest recorded match is a defeat away at Pullar's Rangers of Perth. In its first season the club entered the Perthshire Cup, losing in the first round to Breadalbane at the South Inch in Perth, the match taking place straight after a tie between Pullar's Rangers and Fair City Athletics. In 1885–86 the club reached the semi-final; the second round tie with Breadalbane saw two draws, the first a remarkable 6–6 draw at St Johnstone, in which the Rovers were 5–0 and 6–2 up. Under the rules of the competition, both teams went through to the third. In the semi-final Rovers was heavily defeated by Dunblane; a protest against the eligibility of James Rae as having already played for Our Boys of Dundee in the Scottish Cup was dismissed.

The club joined the Scottish Football Association before the 1886–87 season. This entitled it to enter the Scottish Cup that season, and the club reached the fourth round, made up of 21 clubs. The club survived a protest from Coupar Angus on the basis that spectators "used abusive language and threw mud, &c. at the players and referee". In the fourth round, the club lost 5–1 at St Bernards at Powderhall.

That marked the best run in the Scottish Cup for the club; indeed, the exit from the Scottish Cup marked the apex for the club, as "rumour has it that the Erin Rovers, having gone up like a rocket, are now coming down like the part which does not explode". The club's performances in the rest of the year partly bore this out, with references to the club being in a "weakened" state.

In the 1887–88 Scottish Cup, the club lost 9–3 at home to St Johnstone in the first round, having been 6–1 down at half-time, and in its last entry, in 1888–89, the club lost 6–0 at home in a third round replay against Dunblane. The club also could not get past the third round of the Perthshire Cup, confirming its position as being a step behind the three leading clubs of the county (Dunblane, St Johnstone, and Fair City Athletics).

However the club did have success in the Reid Charity Cup, an invitational tournament for the leading clubs in the area. In 1886–87 the Rovers won a predecessor tournament aimed at raising funds for a swimming baths in Perth, beating Caledonian Rangers and Fair City Athletic, and in 1887–88 Rovers won the first Reid Cup with a win over St Johnstone in the final, coming from 2–0 down to win 4–2, the final two goals coming in the final two minutes.

The club ceased activity after the 1888–89 season, its final match being a defeat in the Reid Cup final, 7–2 by St Johnstone, with the Rovers being "considerably weakened". For 1889–90 the club did not enter the national or local cup, and was not invited back to the Reid Cup, suggesting it was one of the many clubs which had been wound up over the season break.

=== Playing reputation ===
The club had a reputation for hard play, its tactics in its first Scottish Cup tie against St Johnstone leading to criticism outside Perth, and national criticism for the club after Coupar Angus captain Andrew Morris was seriously injured following the Rovers' "rough play". A match against Fair City Athletics, supposedly a friendly, in 1887 turned into a "donnybrook" Even in the club's final season, despite the club being "good passers", there was still a tendency to "go more for the man than the ball", end making "far too free a use of the hands in dragging their opponents off the ball".

Indeed, for the replay in the 1888–89 Cup third round tie, Dunblane wrote to the Scottish FA specifically asking for a referee "who is 'down' on rough play", after the original tie in Dunblane was "one of the roughest that has been played in the Cathedral City, and that, perhaps, is saying a good deal"; the Rovers' left-back "Big Mac" MacMahon had twice suffered suspensions for foul play. The referee appointed - Frank Watt of Edinburgh, one of the most respected figures in the game - made sure "all were satisfied that justice would be firmly and impartially administered".

== Colours ==
The club's colours were green shirts with white shorts.

== Ground ==
The club's earliest home matches were all at the South Inch, in common with a number of other Perth sides, and faced the similar problem to others, in that spectators frequently strayed onto the pitch; in a friendly against Fair City Athletics, one spectator was knocked out by a player trying to keep the ball in touch.

Towards the end of the 1885–86 season, the club held a concert to raise funds for procuring a ground of its own. The new ground, at St Catherine's Park, was opened on 17 April 1886 with a friendly between Dundee Harp and Strathmore of Arbroath, watched by a crowd of 3,000. The Rovers' first match at its new ground was a 12–1 win against Vale of Atholl at the start of May. The pitch however was described as a "ground swell" that "sickened" opponents and gave the club a big home advantage.
