= Coupar Angus F.C. (1877) =

Association football club in Angus, Scotland

Coupar Angus
- Full name: Coupar Angus Football Club
- Nickname(s): the Stripes
- Founded: 1877
- Dissolved: 1893
- Ground: Station Park
Home colours

Coupar Angus Football Club, known as Vale of Strathmore Football Club in 1877–78, was an association football club from Coupar Angus in Scotland. The club was a regular entrant to the Scottish Cup, entering every season from 1878–79 to 1892–93, and once won the Perthshire Cup.

== History ==
The club was founded in 1877. Its first season was played under the name Vale of Strathmore; its first recorded match was a 3–0 defeat against Strathmore (Dundee) in November 1877. The club's first captain was Louis Macfarlane, but after the change of name to Coupar Angus, the club elected George Robertson, a bank manager in Coupar Angus, as captain, and Macfarlane continued as one of the two full-backs.

The club's first Scottish Cup tie was at Rob Roy of Callander, the side losing 1–0 after a match of "give and take" character. The following season the club again lost to Rob Roy, albeit this time because the side was handicapped by an early collision between Macfarlane (playing for the match in goal) and "goal watcher" William Davidson, which saw the latter taken off the field and the former continuing while injured.

Coupar Angus' first victory in the competition was in 1880–81, against Strathmore (Dundee), winning 4–1 in front of "a large number of spectators", in which every goal was scored in the first half. The club lost in the second round 3–0 at home to Arbroath.

Coupar Angus played in the first Perthshire Cup in 1884–85, reaching the semi-final; Coupar Angus lost at home to Vale of Teith, the visitors coming in "for a good amount of 'chaffing'" from the spectators, "the female portion especially being rather demonstrative". The club protested against the refereeing on four grounds; a) the referee did not award a goal for Coupar Angus that was "fully one foot over the goal-line", b) the referee awarded a goal to the Vale despite having blown his whistle for a foul, c) the second goal came 150 seconds after full-time should have been given (and 2 minutes after the referee said time should have been up), and d) "throughout the whole game [the referee's] partiality was glaringly manifested". The Perthshire Football Association dismissed the protest, leaving Coupar Angus threatening to quit the association.

In 1885–86, the club played in the first edition of the Forfarshire Cup, but after a 6–1 second round defeat to Strathmore (Arbroath) eschewed the competition to focus on the Perthshire. The club duly reached the final, played at the St Johnstone Recreation Ground, before a crowd of 1,500. With 15 minutes to go, Coupar Angus was 2–0 up, but ran out of stamina, and Dunblane scored three late goals - the second "a rather soft one" - to retain the trophy. Two months later, the club was involved in a frightening accident; on 1 May 1886, the club had hired a brake from the Coupar Angus Royal Hotel to bring it back from a match against Lochee, but at Tullybaccart Hill one of the wheels gave way and the brake's occupants were ejected. None of the players was injured, but the driver, Donald M'Lean, broke his leg; complications set in and he died four days later.

The club gained revenge on Dunblane in 1886–87, beating the Heather 3–1 at home in the semi-final of the Perthshire Cup, in a "rough and exciting" game that saw Dunblane protest about the behaviour of the spectators. In the final, again at St Johnstone's Park, the club beat Fair City Athletics 2–1, to lift the Perthshire Cup for the only time.

Coupar Angus also reached the third round of the national cup that season for the first time, but this was because Fair City Athletics did not turn up to the first round tie and the club drew a bye in the second. In the third, the club lost 3–2 at Erin Rovers of Perth, all five goals coming in the second half. The club made the third round again the following season, after recording its biggest Cup win of 9–2 against Blairgowrie Our Boys, and again getting the benefit of a bye. In the third the club lost to Dundee Wanderers by its then-biggest Scottish Cup defeat of 8–0.

In 1889–90, the club equalled its defeat, against Fair City Athletics in the second round of the Cup. To the surprise of most, Coupar Angus turned the result around in the Perthshire Cup three weeks later, being 5–3 up at home to the F.C.A. with ten minutes remaining, when visiting supporters invaded the pitch in protest at an injury, leaving Coupar Angus "in a state of riot" after 200 Perth "rowdies" ran amok. Coupar Angus went on to the final, beating Crieff 10–1 away in the semi-final thanks to seven goals for Lawson. In the final, the club lost to St Johnstone at Balhousie Park; Coupar Angus took an early lead, and the score remained 1–1 at half-time, but four quick second half goals sent the cup to Perth for the first time.

In 1891–92, the Scottish Football Association introduced qualifying rounds. That season, the club reached the penultimate round before the competition proper, but scratched to Dunblane. Its defeat in the first preliminary round in 1892–93 to Blairgowrie Our Boys was the club's final Scottish Cup tie. The club continued into the 1893–94 season, but did not enter the Scottish Cup, and its final competitive match was a 6–0 defeat at Tulloch in the Perthshire Cup.

The name was revived on at least two further occasions, the current Coupar Angus F.C. side being a Junior club.

== Colours ==
The club originally played in navy and white 1½" or 1" striped shirts - in the context of the time, "stripes" referred to hoops until the mid-1880s - with white knickers and navy and white stockings until 1892. In its final matches, the club wore plain navy shirts.

== Grounds ==
The club played at a number of grounds around Coupar Angus. It originally played at Larghan Park, to the north-east of the village, occasionally referred to as "Langham". As Vale of Strathmore, the club played on a field owned by a Mr Morrison of "Longham". This ground was probably the same as Larghan Park, given Mr Morrison's land was used for Coupar Angus' Cup tie with Rob Roy in 1879.

By 1885 it was playing at a ground known as Bogside, on the north side; and in 1886 the club was playing at a ground known as Station Park, which remained the club's home until its demise.

== Achievements ==
Scottish Cup

- Best run: third round, 1886–87, 1887–88

Perthshire Cup

- Winners: 1886–87
- Runners-up: 1885–86, 1889–90
