= Crieff F.C. =

Association football club in Scotland

Crieff
- Full name: Crieff Football Club
- Founded: 1883
- Dissolved: 1892
- Ground: Market Park/Burnside Park
- Hon. President: Col. D. Moray
- Secretary: R. A. Campbell
Home colours

Crieff Football Club was a football club from the village of Crieff, Perthshire, Scotland.

== History ==
The club was formed in 1883, originally under the name Crieff Juniors. The club joined the Scottish Football Association in August 1884, and from 1885 was simply called Crieff.

Crieff first entered the Scottish Cup in 1884–85, losing 8–0 to Dunblane in the first round. It entered the Cup every year until 1890–91, after which the Scottish FA introduced qualifying rounds. The club's run of results in the competition was extreme. It won two ties, both by big scores - 7–1 at Caledonian Rangers of Perth in 1887–88 and 10–2 at home to Vale of Athole in 1888–89. Its four defeats were also by big scores; in every defeat the opposing team scored at least 7 goals, the nadir being a 12–0 defeat by a heavier Dunblane side in 1886–87.

Crieff entered the Perthshire Cup from its first running, in 1884–85, until 1891–92. Its best performance was in 1889–90, when reaching the semi-final. The club lost at that stage 10–1 (plus one disputed) at home to Coupar Angus, Lawson scoring seven goals for the visitors.

The club played in the Perthshire Cup in 1891–92, its last game being a loss in the first round to Vale of Ruthven, and was playing as late as January 1892. Afterwards however the club seems to have been moribund, and was effectively replaced in the town by the new Crieff Athletic club. The Crieff Juniors name re-emerged in 1891–92, but it seems to be a new Junior club, which is also defunct within two seasons.

== Colours ==
The club's colours were blue and white jerseys and hose, with (until 1885) white knickers, or (afterwards) blue knickers.

== Ground ==
Crieff's first ground was Market Park, a 5-minute walk from the station. By 1887 the club had moved to Burnside Park, to which the media referred as Braehead Park.
