= Lochgelly F.C. =

- Full name: Lochgelly Football Club
- Nicknames: 'Gelly, the Fifers
- Founded: 1909
- Dissolved: 1915
- Ground: West End Park
- Match Secretary: Martin Smith
- Trainer: Charlie Hain
1909–13 colours	1913–15 colours

Lochgelly Football Club was an association football club from Lochgelly, Fifeshire, active immediately before the First World War.

== History ==
The club was founded in 1909 as a Scottish Junior Football Association member, as a merger of two Junior clubs, Lochgelly Rangers and St Patrick's, under the name Lochgelly Juniors.

With the town's established senior club, Lochgelly United, facing severe difficulties before the 1912–13 season, and rumours spreading about its imminent extinction, the Juniors' committee decided to join the Scottish Football Association to keep senior football alive in the town, and took the name Lochgelly F.C.; the committee also applied to join the Central League. The move revived the "flagging interest" in football in Lochgelly; in response, despite the threat of legal action, United scrambled around to find an XI to play in the Scottish Qualifying Cup, while the new club had already established its squad. Both teams lost their first round ties, but Lochgelly could at least claim some pride in losing 4–1 to the Qualifying Cup holder Dunfermline Athletic, while United suffered an 8–1 hammering from Cowdenbeath.

Lochgelly was also able to enter the Fife Cup in 1912–13, while United did not, and it played in the Eastern League in 1912–13, ranking 8th of 10 of the unfinished table - although West Calder Swifts were two points behind having played half the number of games. Lochgelly also enjoyed a run as the town's sole representative in the Penman Cup, reaching the semi-final, and holding Cowdenbeath to a draw before going down by the odd goal in three in the replay.

=== Revival of Lochgelly United ===
Lochgelly's early lead over United did not last, as in March 1913 the town council formed a committee to help galvanize "the old club", which undermined Lochgelly's pitch to become the senior club in the town. Indeed at the end of the 1912–13 season United made moves to take over Lochgelly, but, as the United committee could not meet the terms Lochgelly's equivalent demanded, and new players were brought in from other clubs, such as goalkeeper Paterson from Dunfermline Athletic and four from Hearts of Beath, to supplement players who had not left for United.

However the revived United soon overtook the newer club. Lochgelly never won a single tie in the Fife Cup or the Wemyss Cup, Both Lochgelly and United applied to join the Central League in June 1913 but United got the nod, Lochgelly remaining in the much lower-key Eastern League, only winning 1 of its 8 matches by the time the competition wound up, unfinished.

=== Scottish Qualifying Cup ===
Lochgelly's greatest achievement was winning through one round of the 1913–14 Scottish Qualifying Cup with a surprise 1–0 win at East Fife, the result being described as "humiliating" and a "smashing blow" for the Methil side, made worse by Lochgelly selling home advantage for £25 and a set of train fares. Centre-forward Reynolds scored "a run-away goal" in the first half, and in the second Paterson performed heroics, saving a penalty two minutes after he had been barged - with ball in hands - into the net, a foul being given. In the second round the club lost 2–1 at Forfar Athletic.

=== Rivalry with United ===
At the start of 1914, the two Lochgelly sides met for the only times, in the second round of the Penman Cup. United won 2–0, but the match was re-played after a protest about an ineligible player; after a goalless draw at United's Recreation Park, in which a player from each side was sent off, United won through 1–0 at West End Park. However, before the 1914–15 season, Lochgelly United was admitted to the Scottish Football League, and this seems to have been the death-knell for Lochgelly. It scratched from the Qualifying Cup in 1914–15 and ceased playing. Its formal end came when being struck from the Scottish FA membership list in August 1915 for non-payment of subscriptions.

== Colours ==
The club originally wore blue shirts, changing to maroon in 1913.

== Ground ==
The club's ground was Reid's Park, which had been United's home ground, and Lochgelly re-named it West End Park.
