= Crieff Morrisonians F.C. =

Association football club in Scotland

Crieff Morrisonians
- Full name: Crieff Morrisonians Football Club
- Nickname: the Sonians
- Founded: 1897
- Dissolved: 1921
- Ground: Turretbridge Park
Home colours

Crieff Morrisonians Football Club was a football club from the town of Crieff, Perthshire, Scotland.

== History ==
The first recorded activity for the club was at the end of the 1896–97 season, under the name Morrisonian F.C., the name taken from Morrison's School in Crieff. Indeed, the club was originally solely for pupils and ex-pupils, although the restriction was subsequently abandoned.

The club sought to join the Perthshire Association for the 1897–98 season, by now called Crieff Morrisonians, but the application was rejected.

The club entered the Scottish Qualifying Cup from 1898–99 to 1920–21. The only time it won through to the Scottish Cup was in 1904–05. Wins over Vale of Teith, Stanley, and Lochee United were enough to qualify for the first round proper. In the fourth round of the Qualifying Cup, the club lost 6–2 at home to St Johnstone, and in the Cup itself, the club went down 3–1 at Kirkcaldy United.

The club's greatest achievements were in winning the Perthshire League in 1908–09 and 1910–11, although the competition in the era scarcely had more than half-a-dozen entrants.

The club reached the final of the Perthshire Cup four times, losing on every occasion. Its closest finals were in 1909–10, losing 2–1 against Dunblane after conceding a last-minute winner via a freak deflection, and 1919–20 losing 3–2 to Blairgowrie Amateurs F.C.; the loss of several players to the junior ranks post-war had cost the team many of its best.

Perhaps the club's finest result was a 4–2 win over St Johnstone en route to the 1909–10 County Cup final, although the Saints turned up two men short. The club did pick up the Consolation Cup in 1911–12, with a 3–0 win at Vale of Atholl F.C. in the final. The second XI also won the Perthshire 2nd XI Cup in 1903–04 and 1904–05, the second year by beating St Johnstone 9–3 in the final, Harry Paul - then still a schoolboy at the academy - being particularly praised for his centre-forward play. During the match, MacPhail tore his shorts, and, because he lived close to the ground, ran home to change into long trousers.

The club became a limited liability company in May 1914, in order to put the club on a more professional footing, and to clear accumulated debts; the plan was to join the Central Football League, but its application failed. World War 1 then put most football competitions in abeyance - indeed the club shut down operations entirely for the duration.

1920–21 proved to be the club's final season. The Sonians' final appearance in the Scottish Cup ended in ignominy; after a walkover in the first round of the Qualifying Cup, the club scratched to Stenhousemuir F.C. in the second, in return for a £20 "bait". The club also scratched from the Perthshire Cup in the semi-final in 1920–21 when drawn to play St Johnstone, and, although it entered the same competition for 1921–22, the club was wound up in March 1921.

== Colours ==
The club's colours were green and white.

== Ground ==
The club originally played at the Hollybush farm ground, owned by a Mr Temple. From 1898 the club moved to Turretbridge Park.

== Notable players ==
- Harry Paul, who later joined Queen's Park and became a Scottish international.
- James MacGregor, left-back who was the only Crieff player to gain County honours, who later played for Partick Thistle F.C. and Dundee F.C.
