= 1924–25 Scottish Cup =

Tournament details
- Country: Scotland

Final positions
- Champions: Celtic
- Runners-up: Dundee

The 1924–25 Scottish Cup was the 47th staging of Scotland's most prestigious football knockout competition. The Cup was won by Celtic, who defeated Dundee in the final.

== First round ==
Non League teams are in italics.

Home team	Score	Away team
Albion Rovers	1 – 1	Clyde
Armadale	3 – 1	Civil Service Strollers
Arthurlie	3 – 1	Cowdenbeath
Ayr United	3 – 1	St Johnstone
Bathgate	0 – 4	Partick Thistle
Broxburn United	3 – 2	Nithsdale Wanderers
Clydebank	0 – 1	Queen's Park
Dundee FC	5 – 0	Johnstone
Dundee United	5 – 1	Aberdeen University
Dunfermline Athletic	1 – 1	Arbroath
Dykehead	1 – 0	Forfar Athletic
East Fife	1 – 3	Rangers
East Stirlingshire	4 – 0	Inverness Clachnacuddin
Falkirk	1 – 1	Morton
FC Bo'ness	1 – 1	Helensburgh
Hamilton Academicals	5 – 2	St Bernard's
Heart of Midlothian	4 – 1	Leith Athletic
Hibernian	0 – 2	Aberdeen
Kilmarnock	3 – 0	Arbroath Athletic
King's Park	0 – 4	Airdireonians
Loghgelly United	4 – 0	Breadalbane
Montrose	6– 2	Inverness Citadel
Motherwell	6 – 3	Galston
Newton Stewart	0 – 2	Dumbarton
Queen of the South	1 – 1	Alloa Athletic
Raith Rovers	3 – 0	Clackmannan
Royal Albert	9 – 1	Stranraer
Solway Star	4 – 2	Stenhousemuir
St Cutherbert's Wanderers	0 – 0	Peebles Rovers
St Mirren	3 – 1	Peterhead
Third Lanark	1 – 5	Celtic
Vale of Leven	2 – 0	Inverness Caledonian

=== First Round Replays ===
Home team	Score	Away team
Alloa Athletic	2 – 0	Queen of the South
Arbroath	1 – 0	Dunfermline Athletic
Clyde	3 – 1	Albion Rovers
Helensburgh	0 – 0	FC Bo'ness
Morton	0 – 3	Falkirk
Peebles Rovers	5 – 0	St Cutherbert's Wanderers

=== First Round 2nd Replay ===
Home team	Score	Away team
FC Bo'ness	2 – 0	Helensburgh

== Second round ==
Home team	Score	Away team
Airdrieonians	4 – 0	Queen's Park
Arbroath	3 – 0	Clyde
Armadale	1 – 1	Aberdeen
Celtic	2 – 1	Alloa Athletic
Dundee	2 – 1	Lochgelly United
Dykehead	3 – 1	Peebles Rovers
Falkirk	2 – 0	Dumbarton
Hamilton Academicals	4 – 0	East Stirlingshire
Kilmarnock	2 – 1	Heart of Midlothian
Montrose	0 – 2	Rangers
Motherwell	2 – 0	Arthurlie
Partick Thistle	5 – 1	Dundee United
Raith Rovers	0 – 0	F.C. Bo'ness
Royal Albert	1 – 3	Broxburn United
St Mirren	1 – 0	Ayr United
Vale of Leven	2 – 2	Solway Star

=== Second Round Replays ===
Home team	Score	Away team
Aberdeen	2 – 0	Armadale
F.C. Bo'ness	1 – 3	Raith Rovers
Solway Star	3 – 3	Vale of Leven

=== Second Round 2nd Replay ===
Home team	Score	Away team
Solway Star	2 – 1	Vale of Leven

== Third round ==
Home team	Score	Away team
Aberdeen	0 – 0	Motherwell
Broxburn United	2 – 1	Falkirk
Celtic	2 – 0	Solway Star
Dundee	3 – 1	Airdrieonians
Hamilton Academicals	1 – 0	Raith Rovers
Kilmarnock	5 – 0	Dykehead
Rangers	5 – 3	Arbroath
St Mirren	2 – 0	Partick Thistle

=== Third round replay ===
Home team	Score	Away team
Motherwell	1 – 2	Aberdeen

== Quarter-finals ==
Home team	Score	Away team
Aberdeen	0 – 2	Hamilton Academical
Dundee	1 – 0	Broxburn United
Kilmarnock	1 – 2	Rangers
St Mirren	0 – 0	Celtic

=== Quarter-final 1st Replay ===
Home team	Score	Away team
Celtic	1 – 1	St Mirren

=== Quarter-final 2nd Replay ===
Home team	Score	Away team
Celtic	1 – 0	St Mirren

== Semi-finals ==
21 March 1925

Celtic	5 – 0	Rangers

Hampden Park, Glasgow
Attendance: 101,714

21 March 1925

Dundee	1 – 1	Hamilton Academical

Tynecastle, Edinburgh
Attendance: 25,000

=== Replays ===
25 March 1925

Dundee	2 – 0	Hamilton Academical

Easter Road, Edinburgh
Attendance: 12,000

== Final ==
11 April 1925

Celtic	2 – 1	Dundee
Gallacher; McGrory		McLean

Hampden Park, Glasgow
Attendance: 75,317

== See also ==
- 1924–25 in Scottish football
