= Central Football Combination =

Central Combination
- Founded: 1897
- Abolished: 1904
- Region: Scotland
- Last champions: Alloa Athletic (1st title)
- Most successful club(s): Stenhousemuir (3 titles)

Formed in 1897 by Camelon F.C., Dunblane F.C., East Stirlingshire F.C., Fair City Athletic F.C., Falkirk F.C., Kilsyth Wanderers F.C., King's Park F.C., St Johnstone F.C. and Stenhousemuir F.C.. This Scottish football competition was basically a continuation of the Midland Football League in Scotland and Central Football League.

== Champions ==
- 1897–98 East Stirlingshire
- 1898–99 Stenhousemuir
- 1899–1900 Falkirk
- 1900–01 Stenhousemuir
- 1901–02 Stenhousemuir
- 1902–03 Alloa Athletic
- 1903–04 unfinished

== Membership ==
- Alloa Athletic 1898–1903
- Bathgate 1902–04
- Bo'ness 1901–04
- Broxburn F.C. 1902–04
- Camelon 1897–1903
- Clackmannan 1898–1901
- Dunblane F.C. 1897–1904
- Dunipace F.C. 1900–01
- East Fife 1903–04
- East Stirlingshire 1897–99, 1903–04
- Fair City Athletic F.C. 1897–98
- Falkirk 1897–1902
- Hearts of Beath F.C. 1903–04
- Kilsyth Wanderers F.C. 1897–1900
- King's Park 1897–1904
- St Johnstone F.C. 1897–98
- Stenhousemuir 1897–1903

== See also ==
- Central League
- Midland League
- Scottish Football (Defunct Leagues)
