= Caledonian Rangers F.C. =

Association football club in Scotland

Caledonian Rangers
- Full name: Caledonian Rangers Football Club
- Founded: 1886
- Dissolved: 1890
- Ground: Dovecotland
- Match Secretary: J. S. Buchan
- Hon. Secretary: George A. Nethel
Home colours

Caledonian Rangers Football Club was a football club from Perth in Scotland.

== History ==
The club was founded in 1886 as a merger of Perth clubs, including Pullar's Rangers (the first club in Perth and an offshoot of a rowing club), and it was immediately accepted as a member of the Scottish Football Association. The club's earliest match was a friendly at home to St Johnstone in August 1886 to raise money for the widow of a railway worker killed in a train accident, and which brought a crowd of 300.

The Rangers entered the Scottish Cup from 1886–87 until 1889–90 but lost in their first tie every time - indeed, the club only managed one draw, 4–4 against Erin Rovers in its first appearance.

The club had a little more success in the Perthshire Cup, twice reaching the semi-final, but only once (1888–89) by winning more than 1 tie. In that season, the club came up short by 11 goals to 1 against Fair City Athletics.

The club occasionally played in the invitational Reid Charity Cup, but its final tie in the competition - and its final competitive match - in 1889–90 ended in ignominy. In the semi-final with St Johnstone, the Rangers went 4–0 down, so goalkeeper Stewart was swapped out to play up front. With five minutes to go, he was finally sent off after being cautioned for rough play but refused to leave the pitch. Referee C. C. Don, therefore, ended the game, which was awarded to the Saints.

With football support in Perth consolidating around St Johnstone and Fair City Athletics, and with the club's ground requisitioned to build a sawmill, the Rangers was broken up and struck from the Scottish Association roll in August 1890.

== Colours ==
The club wore blue jerseys, in different shades; originally dark blue, in 1888–89 light blue, and from 1889 a regular blue.

== Ground ==
The club played at the Caledonian Rangers Ground, at Dovecotland, 4 minutes from the town station.
