= Midland Football League (Scotland) =

The Midland Football League was an association football league tournament in Scotland that was contested in three different periods. The first incarnation of the tournament was founded in 1891 and ran until 1897 when most of the member clubs left to join the Central Football Combination. In 1903, it was reformed for a single season and again in 1908 for three seasons but was largely unfinished. All the teams that competed in the league were based in the Midlands of Scotland.

== Original (1891–1897) ==
Midland Football League (original)
- Founded: 16 May 1891
- Folded: 1897
- Number of clubs: 7 (1896–97)
- Last champions: Clackmannan (1896–97)
- Most championships: 6 clubs (1 title each)

The original Midland Football League was established in 1891 and was contested by teams from the Midlands of Scotland.

At a meeting in April 1891 in Larbert of representatives from eight football clubs there was a discussion about forming a new league. A month later an official meeting was held in Alloa and the Midland Football League was founded. There were ten clubs that competed in the inaugural season: Alloa Athletic, Alva, Bridge of Allan, Camelon, Clackmannan, Cowdenbeath, Dunblane, Dunfermline Athletic, Grangemouth and Raith Rovers. The original Midland Football League ran for seven seasons with membership frequently changing from season to season.

== Reform attempts ==
=== 1903–04 ===
The Midland Football League was reformed in 1903, six years after the original competition folded in 1897. Ten clubs met in Glasgow and reformed the tournament but it lasted for only one season after six of the clubs left to reform the Eastern League. The competition was won by Bo'ness.

=== 1908–11 ===
An attempt was made to reform the league for a second time in 1908 with seven clubs. It ran successfully for one season with Falkirk 'A' winning the league but three clubs left, Bo'ness, Broxburn Athletic and Stenhousemuir, to help form the Central Football League in 1909. For the next two seasons the competition was largely unfinished with a backlog of outstanding fixtures and was eventually cancelled at the end of the 1910–11 season.

== Winners ==
Season	Winner
1891–92	Raith Rovers
1892–93	King's Park
1893–94	East Stirlingshire
1894–95	Falkirk
1895–96	Stenhousemuir
1896–97	Clackmannan
Defunct 1897 to 1903
1903–04	Bo'ness
Defunct 1904 to 1908
1908–09	Falkirk 'A'
1909–10	Clackmannan
1910–11	Hearts of Beath
