= Huntingtower F.C. =

Association football club in Scotland

Huntingtower
- Full name: Huntingtower Football Club
- Nicknames: the Jamies, 'Tower
- Founded: 1890
- Dissolved: 1931 (as senior club), 1953 (as juvenile)
- Ground: Bleachers Park
- President: Alexander Cochrane
Home colours

Huntingtower Football Club was a football club from the village of Huntingtower and Ruthvenfield, Perthshire, Scotland.

== History ==
The club was formed as a Junior club in September 1890, and was a founder member of the Perthshire Junior League, in which it played without success for two seasons. The first recorded match for the club is a 6–1 win over the Tulloch club's second XI in November 1891.

=== Scottish Cup entries ===
The club turned senior in 1895 and first entered the Scottish Cup in 1896, at a time when the Scottish Qualifying Cup had been introduced to reduce the number of one-sided ties in the early rounds. The club's first entry saw it reach the third round, losing to Duncrub Park one round short of making the Cup proper.

The club entered the Scottish Cup every year - other than when interrupted by World War One - until 1930–31. The only time the club made the Scottish Cup proper was in 1919–20, by reaching the fifth round of the Qualifying Cup, at which stage all clubs in the competition were put into the draw for the first round proper. The club however had benefitted from two byes to reach that stage, where it lost 11–0 to Arbroath, playing with an "inexperienced boy" in goal, but being consoled with £30 in gate money. The tie had originally been drawn to be played in Huntingtower but the venue was switched after the clubs came to "satisfactory terms". In the Cup itself, the club gained the benefit of another bye in the first round, putting it into the last 32. Drawn away to Albion Rovers, the Jamies could not raise a team, and scratched.

The club only won one Qualifying Cup tie in the 1920s; the club constantly found it difficult to recruit players for what were increasingly one-off matches, and often scratched from the competition, including on one occasion because of "an ever growing desire to watch St Johnstone". The only tie the club won in the decade was against Blairgowrie Amateurs in 1929; the club lost 10–1 at Falkirk Amateurs in the next round. That was the club's final game in the competition, 'Tower scratching in 1930–31 after being drawn to play Vale of Atholl.

=== Perthshire football ===
The club had some success in the Perthshire League, of which it was a founder member in 1897. The Jamies won the title in 1898–99 and 1909–10, although in 1901–02 a shortage of players (in part due to two players emigrating) caused the club to withdraw mid-season.

'Tower reached the semi-final of the Perthshire Cup in its first entry in 1895–96, losing 6–4 to St Johnstone in a replay. The club reached the semis of the competition in 1897–98 as well but never reached so far again, despite entries until 1926; the club's last win in the competition was against Vale of Atholl in the first round in 1909.

The greater opportunities for competition in the Junior ranks led the club to become a Junior side once more, playing in the Perthshire Junior League from 1919–20 to 1921–22, although in three seasons the club finished bottom twice and one place above once.

=== Juvenile club ===
The club stopped playing Junior football after the 1921–22 season, unable to raise a team. The only side the club ran on a regular basis was its Juvenile side, which first played in the 1920–21 season, and which lasted until 1953. The club however continued to enter the Scottish and Perthshire Cups, for which it was grandfathered in.

== Colours ==
The club played in light blue shirts and dark blue shorts.

== Ground ==
The club's ground was originally the Huntingtower Green, later moving across the road to a different sward called the Tower Pitch on Bleachers Park, said to be behind the castle. The ground's facilities were basic, lacking baths, but, in "dirty conditions", the club "invariably [took] the trouble to provide a tub of water".

== Nickname ==
The club got its nickname of the Jamies after its 9–1 win over Tulloch in the Perthshire Cup in 1895, when the Scottish Referee referred to the side as such, taking the name from the lyrics of the song 'Huntingtower' - "when ye gang awa, Jamie".

== Notable players ==
- James Semple, who left his family in Perthshire to join Manchester United
