= Vale of Teith F.C. =

Association football club in Scotland

Vale of Teith
- Full name: Vale of Teith Football Club
- Nickname(s): the Vale
- Founded: 1877
- Dissolved: 1910
- Ground: Tullochan Knowe
Home colours

Vale of Teith Football Club was an association football club from Doune in Perthshire, Scotland.

== History ==
Vale of Teith was founded in 1877 and took its name from the river flowing through the town.

The club's first competitive fixtures came in the Scottish Cup; the Vale first entered in 1878–79, and beat Clifton & Strathfillan in the first round, but lost to Rob Roy of Callander in the next. As the early rounds of the Cup were drawn on a regional basis, and the Perthshire entry was restricted to four clubs, the same fixtures came out of the hat in 1879–80 and the Vale again lost to Rob Roy in the second round.

The Vale's best run in the competition came in 1881–82, when it reached the fifth round, gaining revenge over Rob Roy with a six-goal win. In the fifth (last 16), the Vale was drawn at home to Shotts, but lost 5–0, going behind after four minutes, turning around 3–0 down at half-time, and conceding two M'Laughlan goals in the second half, which completed his hat-trick.

The Vale nearly equalled that feat in 1882–83, losing 3–2 at home to Hurlford in the fourth round.

The club played in the first Perthshire Cup final against Dunblane in 1884–85, held at Fair City Athletic's ground at Hillyland. A Stokes goal after four minutes gave the Vale the lead; an apparent goal from a M'Ewan corner was disallowed on the basis that the ball had gone straight in from the kick, which at the time was not permitted, despite the Vale claiming that the ball had deflected in off MacPherson of Dunblane. M'Ewan and Robertson put the Vale 3–0 up after 20 minutes, but Dunblane scored three times in the first 20 minutes of the second half, and Laidlaw scored the winner for the Heather with eight minutes to go. The Vale's protest against the disallowing of the MacPherson "goal" was disallowed.

The following season saw the side gain its biggest Scottish Cup win, 9–1 over Oban in the first round of the Scottish Cup (as well as having two goals disallowed), but the club lost 8–1 in the third round at Dundee Harp, the home side having three goals disallowed. The club scratched from the Perthshire Cup tie in 1885–86 against Dunblane because of a snowstorm, albeit one factor might have been a 9–1 defeat to the Heather in friendly the month before.,

The club seemed then to go into stasis until 1890, being formally struck off the Scottish Football Association register before the 1886–87 season for non-payment of subscriptions, and again from 1896 to 1898. During its brief period of competition at the start of the 1890s, the club earned its biggest competitive win, 10–1 against Comrie in the first round of the Perthshire Cup in 1892–93, scoring six times in the second half despite losing Neil through injury at the interval. Although the club entered the Perthshire Cup from 1893 to 1894 to 1895–96, the only match it played in the competition in that period was an 8–2 defeat at home to St Johnstone in 1895.

=== Revival ===
The club fell into abeyance once more after the St Johnstone defeat. It was formally revived at the start of 1898, although it did not play competitively until 1901.

The Vale's final run from 1901 to 1907 was its most competitive at a local level, reaching the Perthshire Cup final in 1902–03, 1906–07, and 1907–08, although it never won through the Scottish Qualifying Cup into the Scottish Cup again. The closest the club came to winning the Perthshire Cup was in its penultimate final, losing 1–0 after extra time to St Johnstone in a third replay held at Turretbridge Park in Crieff; the Saints had missed a penalty in the second.

The club's last Perthshire Cup Final, in which the club put in an unexpectedly poor performance, and was beaten 5–1 by St Johnstone, was the club's final competitive match.

=== Doune Castle ===
By the late 1900s, the club's finances were so poor that, at the end of the 1907–08 season, the local amateur dramatic society donated £5 2s surplus from a play to the club. The club also asked the Perthshire FA for a share in the proceeds of the 1908 Cup final, which was refused.

The only route out was to re-start the club under the new name Doune Castle. At the start of the 1908–09 season, the Perthshire FA accepted the new club as a member. Under that name, the club finally won its only trophy; the 1908–09 Perthshire Consolation Cup, for clubs eliminated from the main cup before the final, beating Breadalbane 1–0 "after a dour struggle" at St Johnstone's Recreation Park.

The next season, the club was drawn at home to Scone in the third round of the competition in 1909–10, and was not expected to have much difficulty with the visitors; however, Scone scored twice in the first five minutes, half-back Tunnoch was sent off just after half-time following a "dispute" with Scone goalkeeper Macpherson, and the Castle goalkeeper Allan was forced to go off with injury. Scone eventually won 4–0; Tunnoch was banned for the season and Doune Castle ordered to pay Scone railway fares, failing which the club would be suspended. That indeed seems to have been the club's final match.

== Colours ==
The club's colours were royal blue jerseys with white knickers and 1" blue and white striped hose.

The club was forced to re-play a Perthshire Cup tie with the Vale of Allan club from Kinbuck in 1885 because of a protest about the lack of uniformity in the Teith outfits - two players wearing a dark blue, and Ferguson wearing blue and white stripes - even though there was no clash with the Allan.

== Ground ==
The club originally played at Tullochan Knowe. Before the 1903–04 season the club moved to Moray Park.

== Notable players ==
- George Buchanan, who joined Heart of Midlothian from the club
- Alexander Sloan and John Fleming, who joined Doune Castle from King's Park in 1908
