= Scone F.C. =

Association football club in Scotland

Scone
- Full name: Scone F.C.
- Nickname: the Royalists
- Founded: 1896
- Dissolved: 1922
- Ground: Balgarvie Park
- President: Col. W. S. Ferguson
- Secretary: J. Robertson
final colours

Scone Football Club was an association football club from Scone, Perthshire.

== History ==
The club was the second of the name, the first being briefly active at the start of the 1880s. Scone's return to the game in 1896 was for friendlies at first, taking up competitive football by entering the Perthshire Cup in 1897–98, beating Black Watch in the first round, and losing 9–0 to Fair City Athletic in the second.

The club did however win the new Perthshire League that season, by winning every one of its 10 matches, albeit the competition did not include the Perth clubs. Scone won the competition twice more, in 1900–01 and 1904–05, but never won the Perthshire Cup, reaching the final in 1911–12, where it was due to play St Johnstone in February. The original final date was postponed after the Scottish Football League ordered the Saints to give a Division II fixture at Dumbarton precedence, and, by the date the final was to take place, Scone lost two of its players to injury, a third fell ill on the eve of the match, and the fourth suffered a family bereavement; with no reserves of which to speak, Scone asked for a postponement, but the Perthshire FA deemed the failure to provide a side a scratching, and awarded the Cup to the Saints.

The club's cup successes came in the Perthshire Consolation Cup, for clubs eliminated in earlier rounds, which it won in 1910–11 and 1912–13, and the Atholl Cup, for clubs based in and around Pitlochry, which it won three times.

Scone also took part in the Scottish Qualifying Cup from 1899 to 1921, with a break between 1907 and 1911, and for the First World War. The club's best run was in 1903–04, losing 3–2 at Stanley in the third round, when a win would have put the club into the Scottish Cup proper.

By 1922 the club was struggling for funds, needing to re-build its pavilion, and even being denied permission to bring a calf from Nottingham for sale. However, although the pavilion was re-built, the club did not continue past 1922, being expelled from the Scottish FA in March that year for scratching from cup competitions in consecutive years. The Junior side Scone Thistle was left as sole representative.

=== Death of Menzies Emery ===
In December 1901, the club suffered a tragedy, when its 18 year old player D. Menzies Emery died of pneumonia, said to have been caught in a match against the Black Watch the week before.

== Colours ==
The club originally played in white. In 1903 it changed to red and white, and by 1911 was wearing the black and gold which it used until its demise.

== Ground ==
The club played on a ground granted them by Col. Ferguson, the town councillor, on Balgarvie Park, at the top of the village.

== Honours ==
- Perthshire Cup
  - Runner-up: 1911–12
- Atholl Cup
  - Winner: 1901–02, 1910–11, 1911–12
- Perthshire Consolation Cup
  - Winner: 1910–11, 1912–13
  - Runner-up: 1913–14
- Perthshire League
  - Winner: 1897–98, 1900–01, 1904–05
  - Runner-up: 1902–03, 1905–06
