= James Haldane (footballer) =

Scottish footballer

Personal information
- Full name: James Haldane
- Date of birth: 19 December 1890
- Place of birth: Dundee, Scotland
- Date of death: 27 August 1915 (aged 24)
- Place of death: Pas-de-Calais, France
- Height: 5 ft 6 in (1.68 m)
- Position: Inside right

Senior career*
Years	Team	Apps	(Gls)
–1914	Hearts of Beath		
1914–1915	Lochgelly United	1	(0)
- * Club domestic league appearances and goals

James Haldane (19 December 1890 – 27 August 1915) was a Scottish professional footballer who played in the Scottish League for Lochgelly United as an inside right. He was killed in action during the First World War.

== Personal life ==
At the age of 18, Haldane was working as a miner and he later served in the Territorial Army for four years. Soon after Britain's entry into the First World War, Haldane enlisted in the British Army in Glencraig. On 8 August 1914, he joined the Royal Scots as a private at Glencorse Barracks. Haldane was killed on 27 August 1915 when a working party, of which he was a member, came under German machine gun fire while digging a trench in France. He died instantly while helping to carry a wounded comrade in. Haldane was buried in Cambrin Churchyard Extension.

== Career statistics ==
Appearances and goals by club, season and competition
Club	Season	League			National Cup		Total	
Club	Season	Division	Apps	Goals	Apps	Goals	Apps	Goals
Lochgelly United	1914–15	Scottish Second Division	1	0	—		1	0
Career total			1	0	0	0	1	0
