= Duckburn Park =

Football ground in Dunblane, Scotland

- Location within Stirling
- Location: Dunblane, Scotland
- Coordinates: 56.1812°N 3.9650°W
- Surface: Grass

Tenants
- Dunblane F.C. Dunblane Rovers

Duckburn Park was a football ground in Dunblane, Scotland. It was the home ground of Dunblane and Dunblane Rovers, and hosted a single Scottish Football League (SFL) match.

== History ==
Prior to World War I, Duckburn Park was the home ground of Dunblane F.C. Although the club folded during World War I, a new Junior club was formed after the war and used Duckburn Park.

In 1921 the ground was used to host an SFL fixture, as crowd trouble at King's Park's home match against St Johnstone on 8 October 1921 led to the authorities closing King's Park's Forthbank Park for one match. As a result, the match between King's Park and Vale of Leven on 5 November 1921 (a 2–2 draw) was switched to Dunblane's Duckburn Park.

After the ground closed, the site was used for an industrial estate.
