= Perthshire League =

- Founded: 1897
- Abolished: 1957
- Region: Scotland

The Perthshire League was a league association football tournament for teams in Perthshire, Scotland.

== History ==
The League was set up on 8 January 1898 at a meeting at the White Horse Hotel in Perth, by representatives of five of the senior clubs, plus two junior, clubs in the county:

- Airleywight
- Duncrub Park
- Huntingtower
- Luncarty
- Scone
- Stanley
- Tulloch

Having helped to set up the League, Duncrub Park decided not to take part, although it did finally join the League in 1901. The competition was aimed at clubs in the county, rather than urban areas, so clubs from Perth were not included.

The first champion, in 1897–98, was Scone, which won every one of its 10 matches. Luncarty withdrew after three games of the 1898–99 season and was replaced the following year by Bridge of Earn.

Clubs from Perth were able to join from the 1901–1902 season, but the two Perth clubs which did join - Fair City Athletic and Perth West End - did not finish the season; both were expelled, the former for non-fulfilment of fixtures, the latter for an infringement in the Second XI Cup.

The League struggled for membership in the 1920s, inviting the St Johnstone reserve side, and also casting its net into Angus, as the new Arbroath Athletic club needed to play in a league competition. However its one-season - 1923–24 - caused problems as the increased travel expenses meant that the Athletic only played five matches out of a possible 16, winning them all; the title, originally withheld, was eventually awarded to Dunkeld & Birnam, who had a negative goal difference after 7 wins and 4 defeats - one of the latter being 7–3 to Athletic.

The competition eventually came to a halt after the 1956–57 season, the final championship going to Breadalbane.

== Champions ==
- 1897–98: Scone (1)
- 1898–99: Huntingtower (1)
- 1900–01: Scone (2)
- 1901–02: Stanley (1)
- 1902–03: Stanley (2)
- 1903–04: Tulloch (1)
- 1904–05: Scone (3)
- 1905–06: Tulloch (2)
- 1906–07: Stanley (3)
- 1907–08: Stanley (4)
- 1908–09: Crieff Morrisonians (1)
- 1909–10: Huntingtower (2)
- 1910–11: Crieff Morrisonians (2)
- 1911–12: Tulloch (3)
- 1913–14: Tulloch (4)
- 1919–20: Blairgowrie (1)
- 1920–21: Vale of Atholl (1)
- 1923–24: Dunkeld & Birnam (1)
- 1924–25: Dunkeld & Birnam (2)
- 1925–26: Vale of Atholl (2)
- 1926–27: Breadalbane (1)
- 1927–28: Vale of Atholl (3)
- 1928–29: Vale of Atholl (4)
- 1929–30: Vale of Atholl (5)
- 1930–31: Birnam Rovers
- 1931–32: Vale of Atholl (6)
- 1933–34: Blairgowrie (2)
- 1934–35: Blairgowrie (3)
- 1935–36: Blairgowrie (4)
- 1936–37: Breadalbane (2)
- 1937–38: Breadalbane (3)
- 1938–39: Breadalbane (4)
- 1946-47: Breadalbane (5)
- 1947–48: Breadalbane (6)
- 1948–49: Vale of Atholl (7)
- 1949–50: Breadalbane (7)
- 1950–51: Grandtully Vale (1)
- 1951–52: Grandtully Vale (2)
- 1952–53: Grandtully Vale (3)
- 1953–54: Breadalbane (8)
- 1955–56: Breadlbane (9)
- 1956–57: Breadalbane (10)

The competition was not finished in 1899–1900, 1912–13, 1932–33, 1939–40, and 1954–55, and was not played for from 1914 to 1919, 1921 to 1923, 1940–41, and from 1943 to 1945. The 1941–42, 1942-43 and 1945–46 Perthshire League competitions were competed for by a mixture of junior, amateur, and service XIs, the first and latter editions being won by Army teams - Black Watch and the 8th ITCC C Company. The 1942-43 edition was abandoned in early 1942.

== See also ==
- Scottish Football (Defunct Leagues)
