= Arbroath Athletic F.C. =

Association football club in Angus, Scotland

Arbroath Athletic
- Full name: Arbroath Athletic Football Club
- Nicknames: the Blues, Red Lichties
- Founded: 1922
- Dissolved: 1929
- Ground: Hospitalfield
- President: George T. Shepherd
Home colours

Arbroath Athletic Football Club was a Scottish association football club based in the town of Arbroath, Angus.

== History ==
The club was founded on 4 August 1922 as Arbroath United, which was also the name of a cricket team. The club applied to join the Scottish Football Association almost instantly but its application was deferred, because of an objection by Arbroath F.C. over the name. By 16 August the club had changed its name to Arbroath Athletic and the Scottish FA accepted it as an associate member.

The club entered the Scottish Qualifying Cup in 1922–23 with a view to participating in the Scottish Cup, and, by reaching the Qualifying Cup semi-final, the club was able to enter the first round of the Cup proper. In the first round, 2,000 saw Athletic lose 3–0 at home to Ayr United.

The same season saw the club enter the Eastern League, but it was the final season of that competition after three clubs left to join the Scottish Football League. Indeed, Athletic was the only one of the entrants never to play in the Scottish League. It did explore the possibility of playing in the new Scottish Football League Third Division, on the basis that it was the only club in the defunct league not to have an alternative league place but was rejected on the logical basis that the town of Arbroath was too small to support two League clubs; even in 1931 Arbroath was half the size of Perth, which only had one semi-professional club, and less than half the size of Ayr, whose two League clubs had merged before World War 1.

After the start of the 1923–24 season, Athletic was invited to play in the Perthshire League to ensure even numbers, but the club was not a good geographical fit, and only played 5 out of the scheduled 14 games; Arbroath won all five, but the title was awarded to Dunkeld & Birnam, who had a negative goal difference after 7 wins and 4 defeats - one of the latter being 7–3 to Athletic.

Athletic did not find an alternative league and was forced into playing cup competitions alone. It twice more won through the Qualifying Cup to play in the first round of the Scottish Cup. In the 1924–25 Scottish Cup the club lost at Kilmarnock; in the 1926–27 Scottish Cup it lost 7–0 at home to Dundee United. It entered the Forfarshire Cup from 1925–26 to 1928–29 but never won a tie.

The attempt at a second senior side in a town the size of Arbroath was always quixotic, and, without a suitable league or regular income, the club was doomed. It scratched from the national and county cups in 1928–29, being unable to raise a team, and the club was formally struck from the Scottish FA register in March 1929, as it had scratched from the Scottish Cup in consecutive seasons.

== Colours ==
The club's original plan was to play in maroon shirts with white collars, but following objections from Arbroath F.C. - whose traditional colour maroon was (and is) - the club adopted blue.

== Ground ==
The club played at Hospitalfield.

== Nickname ==
Despite not playing in the same colours as the older team in town, the club did share the nickname, being referred to as the Red Lichties more than once in the local media as it was applied to town more than team at the time. The club was also more logically known as the Blues.

== Notable players ==
- Jock McTavish, who played for the club in 1922–23. The relationship did not end well with McTavish reporting the club to the Scottish FA for non-payment of wages.
