= Recreation Park, Lochgelly =

Former sports ground in Lochgelly, Scotland

Recreation Park
- Location within Fife
- Location: Lochgelly, Scotland
- Coordinates: 56.1277°N 3.3151°W
- Owner: Lochgelly Recreation Company
- Capacity: 15,000
- Surface: Grass
- Record attendance: 10,000
- Field size: 120 x 80 yards

Construction
- Opened: 1910
- Closed: 1934

Tenant
- Lochgelly United (1910–1928)

Recreation Park was a football ground in Lochgelly, Scotland. It was the home ground of Lochgelly United from 1910 until the club folded in 1928.

== History ==
Lochgelly United moved to Recreation Park from Reids Park in 1894, leasing it from the Lochgelly Recreation Company. A grandstand (possibly brought from Reids Park) was erected on the northern side of the pitch and there was an embankment in the south-western corner of the ground. The club were elected to Division Two of the Scottish Football League in 1914, and their first SFL match at Recreation Park was played on 15 August 1914, a 4–0 defeat by local rivals Cowdenbeath.

The ground's record attendance of 10,000 was set for a Scottish Cup third-round game against Third Lanark on 21 February 1920. The club left the SFL at the end of the 1925–26 season when Division Three was disbanded; the last SFL match at Recreation Park was on 24 April 1926, a 1–1 draw with Solway Star.

Lochgelly United folded in 1928, but the ground continued to be used for football until 1934, when the site was used for housing.
