= Lochgelly United F.C. =

Former association football club in Lochgelly, Scotland

Lochgelly United
- Full name: Lochgelly United Football Club
- Nickname: The Happylanders
- Founded: 1890
- Dissolved: 1928
- Ground: Schools Park, Lochgelly; Reids Park, Lochgelly; Recreation Park, Lochgelly
Home colours

Lochgelly United Football Club was a football club based in Lochgelly, Scotland. Nicknamed the 'Happylanders', the club were members of the Scottish Football League between 1914 and 1926.

== History ==
The club was formed in 1890 by the merger of two local clubs, Lochgelly Athletic (formed 1886) and Fifeshire Hibernian (formed 1889), and initially played at Schools Park. They spent their time variously in the Northern and Central leagues, and even had a spell between 1898 and 1902 when they played only cup games and friendlies. In 1901 the club moved to Reids Park, where they remained until 1910, when they moved again, to Recreation Park.

The club nearly wound up before the 1912–13 season, and the role of senior football was taken over by Lochgelly F.C., but in March 1913 the town council formed a committee to help galvanize "the old club". After beating Lochgelly to a place in the Central League in 1913, the club was elected to the Scottish Football League Second Division in 1914, although the competition was suspended in 1915 due to World War I, and Lochgelly F.C. was dissolved.

The club continued in the Eastern and Central Leagues and returned to the Second Division when it was reinstated in 1921. However the club suffered a traumatic season in 1923–24, setting two unwanted records for the old Second Division – most defeats in a season (30) and fewest league goals in a season (20). The Happylanders' home form that season had been noted for low scores with the club and their visitors sharing only 22 goals in 18 of the 19 matches. However, in one match, played against King's Park on 16 February 1924, the club lost 8–3, half the total of all the others put together.

They were relegated to the new Third Division in 1924 and, when this was disbanded at the end of the 1925–26 season, they joined the Scottish Football Alliance. They remained in this league until 1928 when they were wound up, the directors the following year forming a new club, Lochgelly Amateurs.

== Colours ==
The club originally wore Oxford blue and cardinal shirts, changing in 1893 to white shirts and in 1896 to blue and white vertical stripes. In 1899 it adopted the black and gold which became its regular colour, originally in hoops but from 1907 in stripes. The club briefly adopted dark blue jerseys in 1923 for two seasons.

== Former players ==
1. Players that have played/managed in the top two divisions of the Scottish Football League or any foreign equivalent to this level (i.e. fully professional league).
2. Players with full international caps.
3. Players that hold a club record or have captained the club.

- (Scotland) Archie Devine
- (Scotland) James Haldane
- (Scotland) Tommy Vail
