= Perthshire Amateur Football Association =

- Country: Scotland
- Confederation: UEFA
- Divisions: 2
- Number of clubs: 17
- Level on pyramid: N/A
- Promotion to: None
- Relegation to: None
- Domestic cup: Scottish Amateur Cup

The Perthshire Amateur Football Association (PAFA) is a football league competition for amateur clubs in the Perthshire area of Scotland. The association is affiliated to the Scottish Amateur Football Association.

The association has two divisions.

== League membership ==
In order to join the association, clubs need to apply and are then voted in by current member clubs.

== 2025–26 league members ==
=== Division One ===
- Alyth
- Auchterarder Primrose
- Balmoral United
- Breadalbane
- Bridgeton United
- Burrelton Rovers
- Jeanfield Swifts
- Kettins
- Luncarty
- St. John’s

=== Division Two ===
- Bertha Park
- Kinnoull
- Kinrossie Caledonian
- Letham Community
- Methven Athletic
- Scone Thistle
- St. John’s Athletic
- Stanley
- Vale of Atholl
- Wolfhill

== Current Champions ==
=== Division One ===
Jeanfield Swifts

=== Division Two ===
Bridgeton United

=== Ashleigh Cup ===
Jeanfield Swifts

=== Atholl Cup ===
Breadalbane

=== Birks Cup ===
Breadalbane

=== Consolation Cup ===
Burrelton Rovers

=== Marshall Cup ===
Balmoral United

=== North Perthshire Cup ===
Breadalbane

=== Perth & District Cup ===
Jeanfield Swifts

=== Perthshire Cup ===
Jeanfield Swifts

=== Presidents Cup ===
Jeanfield Swifts

=== Smith League Cup ===
Jeanfield Swifts
