= Eastern Football League (Scotland) =

This was a Scottish non-league football (soccer) competition that ran at various times between 1891 and 1946.

== Eastern Alliance ==
=== 1891–92 ===
The Eastern Football Alliance was formed in 1891–92 by predominantly six Linlithgowshire clubs: Mossend Swifts, Armadale, Bathgate Rovers, Bo'ness, Broxburn, and Leith Hibernian (a club related to the original Hibernian).

Kirkcaldy were later admitted to the league, but withdrew during the season and their results expunged. Leith Hibernian were dissolved before the tournament started, and were replaced by Adventurers.

The league remained unfinished and was wound before the season finished.

== East of Scotland League ==
=== 1893–94 ===
The first East of Scotland Football League was formed in 1893–94 by six West Lothian clubs. The league was officially formed and its officials were selected at the East of Scotland FA Rooms in January 1894.

Broxburn Shamrock were to join after the first season. The competition was poorly received. It was unfinished primarily because it had started so late in the season.

== Eastern League ==
=== 1904–07 ===
Eastern League
- Founded: 1904
- Abolished: 1907
- Region: Scotland
- Last champions: Hearts 'A' (2nd title)
- Most championships: Hearts 'A' (2 titles)

After an unsuccessful season of the revived Midland League, the Eastern Football League was reformed by nine clubs on 6 August 1904. One of those clubs, Hearts of Beath, was later replaced with Hearts 'A'.

After a single season, member clubs Bo'ness, Broxburn, and Broxburn Shamrock all left to join the reformed Scottish Alliance. An ailing league only lasted another season before it was disbanded.

==== Champions ====
1904–05 Heart of Midlothian 'A'

1905–06 Heart of Midlothian 'A'

1906–07 unfinished

==== Membership ====
- Adventurers 1904–1906
- Bathgate 1904–1905
- Berwick Rangers 1905–1907
- Bo'ness 1904–1905
- Broxburn 1904–1905
- Broxburn Athletic 1905–1907
- Broxburn Shamrock 1904–1905, 1906–1907
- Cowdenbeath 'A' 1905–1906
- Dykehead 1904–1905
- East Fife 1904–1905
- Heart of Midlothian 'A' 1904–1907
- West Calder Swifts 1904–1905
- West Lothian Albion 1906–1907

=== 1912–14 ===
The Eastern Football League was revived in 1912–13 and lasted for two seasons.

It came about after the Northern League had lost several of its principal clubs to other leagues, and there was a failed attempt to re-form as the North Eastern League with clubs from the Lothians and Borders.

==== Membership ====
- Broxburn Shamrock 1912–14
- Clackmannan 1912–14
- Dumfermline Athletic 'A' 1913–14
- Gala Fairydean 1912–14
- Hearts of Beath 1912–13
- Lochgelly 1912–14
- Musselburgh 1912–13
- Peebles Rovers 1912–14
- Selkirk 1912–14
- Vale of Leithen 1912–14
- West Calder Swifts 1912–13

=== 1915–18 ===
Eastern League
- Founded: 1915
- Abolished: 1918
- Region: Scotland
- Last champions: Cowdenbeath (2nd title)
- Most championships: Cowdenbeath (2 titles)

In 1915, the Scottish League suspended its Division Two for the remainder of World War I. The member clubs combined with multiple non-league sides formed two regional leagues: Western and Eastern Football Leagues.

Although the Western League continued throughout the World War II, the Eastern League went into abeyance after season 1917–18 due to the lack of clubs still operating in the area.

==== Champions ====
1915–16 Armadale

1916–17 Cowdenbeath

1917–18 Cowdenbeath

==== Membership ====
- Armadale 1915–1918
- Bathgate 1915–1917
- Broxburn United 1915–1917
- Cowdenbeath 1915–1918
- Dundee 1917–1918
- Dundee Hibernian 1915–1918
- Dunfermline Athletic 1915–1918
- East Fife 1915–1918
- East Stirlingshire 1915–1917
- Kirkcaldy United 1915–1916
- Leith Athletic 1915–1916
- Lochgelly United 1915–1918
- Raith Rovers 1917–1918
- St Bernard's 1915–1917

=== 1919–23 ===
Eastern League
- Founded: 1919
- Abolished: 1923
- Region: Scotland
- Last champions: Dundee Hibernian (1st title)
- Most championships: Dundee Hibernian (1 title)

==== Champions ====
1919–20 Dundee Hibernian

1920–21

1921–22

1922–23

==== Membership ====
- Aberdeen 'A' 1922–1923
- Arbroath 1919–1920
- Arbroath Athletic 1922–1923
- Brechin City 1919–1923
- Clackmannan 1922–1923
- Cowdenbeath 1919–1920
- Dundee 'A' 1919–1920, 1922–1923
- Dundee Hibernian 1919–1920, 1922–1923
- Forfar Athletic 1919–1920
- leith Athletic 1922–1923
- Lochgelly United 1919–1920
- Montrose 1919–1923
- Peebles Rovers 1921–1922
- Raith Rovers 'A' 1919–1920
- St Johnstone 1919–1920

== See also ==
- East of Scotland League
  - (supplementary competition, 1894–1907)
- East of Scotland League
  - (level 6–9 on pyramid, founded 1923)
- Scottish Football (Defunct Leagues)
