= Central Football League =

There have been at least three competitions in Scotland known as the Central Football League.

The first was originally formed in 1896 by five clubs – Cowdenbeath, Dunfermline Athletic, Fair City Athletic, Kirkcaldy and St Johnstone. In 1897 this version was superseded by the Central Football Combination.

Champions

- 1896–97 Cowdenbeath
- 1897–98 not completed

Membership

- Alloa Athletic 1897–1898
- Cowdenbeath 1896–1898
- Dundee 'A' 1897–98
- Dunfermline Athletic 1896–1898
- Fair City Athletic 1896–1897
- Hearts of Beith 1897–1898
- Kirkcaldy 1896–1898
- Lochgelly United 1896–1898
- St Johnstone 1896–97

A new Central League, based in Stirlingshire, was competed for in 1903–04 (members: Dunblane, King's Park and Strathallan) and 1904–05 (members: Alloa Athletic, Camelon, Dunblane, King's Park and Stenhousemuir). The fixtures were not completed in either season but the leaders were both awarded the championship.

Champions

- 1903–04 Dunblane
- 1904–05 King's Park

The Central League was reformed in 1909 with twelve members – Alloa Athletic, Arbroath, Bathgate, Bo'ness, Broxburn Athletic, Dunfermline Athletic, East Fife, King's Park, Kirkcaldy United, Lochgelly United and St Johnstone. The League closed down after 1915 because of World War I and a number of clubs transferred to the new Eastern Football League.

Champions

- 1909–10 Bo'ness
- 1910–11 Dunfermline Athletic
- 1911–12 Dunfermline Athletic
- 1912–13 Alloa Athletic
- 1913–14 Armadale
- 1914–15 Armadale

Membership

- Alloa Athletic 1909–1915
- Arbroath 1909–1915
- Armadale 1911–1915
- Bathgate 1909–1914
- Bo'ness 1909–1915
- Broxburn 1911–1912
- Broxburn Athletic 1909–1910
- Broxburn United 1912–1915
- Clackmannan 1914–1915
- Dundee 'A' 1912–1915
- Dunfermline Athletic 1909–1912
- East Fife 1909–1915
- Falkirk 'A' 1912–1912
- Forfar Athletic 1913–1915
- Heart of Midlothian 'A' 1910–1911
- King's Park 1909–1915
- Kirkcaldy United 1909–1915
- Lochgelly United 1909–1912, 1913–1914
- Montrose 1914–1915
- St Johnstone F.C. 1909–1911
- Stenhousemuir 1909–1915

The league closed down in 1915 because of the War but when the Scottish Football League refused to re-institute the Second Division in 1919, the Central Football League was re-formed. Since this competition was independent, member clubs could attract players by paying higher wages than those allowed under the maximum wage rules that applied to Scottish League clubs.

Champions

- 1919–20 Bo'ness
- 1920–21 Bo'ness

Membership

- Alloa Athletic 1919–1921
- Armadale 1919–1921
- Bathgate 1919–1921
- Bo'ness 1919–1921
- Broxburn United 1919–1921
- Clackmannan 1920–1921
- Cowdenbeath 1920–1921
- Dundee Hibernian 1920–1921
- Dunfermline Athletic 1919–1921
- East Fife 1919–1921
- East Stirlingshire 1919–1921
- Falkirk 'A' 1919–1921
- Heart of Midlothian 'A' 1919–1921
- King's Park 1919–1921
- Lochgelly United 1920–1921
- St Bernard's 1919–1921
- St Johnstone 1920–1921
- Stenhousemuir 1919–1921

In these two seasons, a League Cup was also organised.

League Cup winners

- 1919–20 Heart of Midlothian 'A'
- 1920–21 not completed

In 1921, the Central League was absorbed by the Scottish League as the Second Division.

The Calder Shield was awarded to the league champions and after its dissolution, the trophy was competed for by the Linlithgowshire clubs in a knock-out competition.

Calder Shield winners

- 1921–22 Bo'ness
- 1922–23 Armadale
- 1923–24 Broxburn United
- 1924–1926 no competition
- 1926–27 unfinished
