= Blairgowrie Amateurs F.C. =

Association football club in Perthshire, Scotland

Blairgowrie Amateurs
- Full name: Blairgowrie Amateurs Football Club
- Nicknames: the Berrypickers, the Blair
- Founded: 1912
- Dissolved: 1947
- Ground: Davie Park
- President: Bailie Dewar
Home colours

Blairgowrie Amateurs Football Club, known as Blairgowrie from 1923, was a football club from Blairgowrie in Perthshire, Scotland.

== History ==
The club was founded in 1912 at the suggestion of Harry Christie of Duncrub Park under the name Blairgowrie Amateurs.

The club had a considerable rivalry with the Stanley club in the 1910s, with matches affected by violence and pitch invasions, apparently provoked by a Blairgowrie man (James Rutherford) replacing a Stanley man on the Scottish Football Association's committee. The most outstanding example being a general mêlée in the Perthshire League game on 28 March 1914, in which the sending-off of Blairgowrie's Andrew Richardson, and his attempt to assault the referee, provoked a mass fight that saw Richardson prosecuted and fined £2.

As a senior football club, it was entitled to enter the Scottish Qualifying Cup, a competition which acted as a feeder into the Scottish Cup, with clubs reaching the latter stages of the Qualifying Cup being entitled to enter the national competition. Blairgowrie succeeded on winning through to the Cup proper on 7 occasions between 1920–21 and 1938–39. In the 1923–24 competition, it survived a protest from Arbroath Athletic for infringing professional regulations, but the fall-out from the successful defence was that the club was forced to drop the Amateurs from its name; the club was henceforth known simply as Blairgowrie.

For the latter part of the 1920s, the club was more or less defunct, its only fixtures of note being in the Qualifying Cup. The club was resuscitated in 1931, briefly using the Blairgowrie Amateurs name once more, thanks to the efforts of Francis Balfour of the Perthshire Football Association.

Its best performance in the Qualifying Cup itself was in 1935–36 and 1937–38, both times reaching the final of the northern section, but losing both times to Elgin City; the first time by 4–2 at Grant Street Park, having taken an early lead the second time 6–3 at Victoria Park, Buckie, again having taken an early lead.

The Berrypickers lost in the first round of the Cup proper on 6 of the 7 occasions, the most notable of those being a 14–2 defeat at Rangers in 1933–34. Only the excellent performance of Malcolm in goal kept the score down; Jimmy Fleming scored 9 goals for the home side. Blairgowrie however was consoled with a share of match receipts of £100.

The one exception was in 1938–39, when Blairgowrie pulled off a shock victory over Dumbarton, with a Linton penalty after 3 minutes, Roland making it 2–1 on the hour, and Linton forcing the ball home in the 84th giving Blair a 3–2 victory; it was sweet justification for Malcolm in goal, chaired off as man of the match by some of the 1,500 in attendance. The club was unlucky in the last sixteen, in being drawn against one of the few other non-league sides left, Buckie Thistle; Buckie missed two penalties, one of which was saved by Malcolm, and Blair was 3 minutes away from a place in the quarter-finals when Malcolm could not hold a cross and Ross made the score 3–3. As the replay had to take place in midweek because of Buckie's league commitments, Blair had difficulties in raising a team as a result of work commitments, and duly lost 4–1, although Malcolm saved another penalty. The club at least enjoyed a record home crowd of 1,880 and had a share in the £180 receipts for the 3,900 crowd at Buckie.

The club won the amateur Perthshire League five times between 1919–20 and 1936–37, the last four consecutively. The club was also a 7-time winner of the Perthshire Cup, between 1919 and 1920 and 1938–39.

Blairgowrie did continue after World War 2, being put into the short-lived Midlands section of the Qualifying Cup in 1946–47. The Berrypickers brushed Burntisland Shipyard aside 7–2 in the first round, and was drawn against Babcock & Wilcox in the second, The match did not take place and the club seems to have disbanded, being replaced in the town by the new Junior club Blairgowrie Juniors.

== Colours ==
The club wore blue shirts with maroon facings in its first season, and maroon shirts with blue sleeves until 1920. Its colours afterwards were black and white striped shirts and black shorts and socks, although for the Qualifying Cup final in 1935 the club wore white shirts with a black horizontal band.

== Ground ==
The club's original ground was Altamont Park; it lost access to this ground after World War 1, but secured a private ground at Lower Haugh Park in 1920. By 1924 it was playing at Ashgrove Park.

After its revival it played at Davie Park. As a public park ground, the facilities were spartan, with half-a-dozen lorries making do for grandstands for the Cup tie with Buckie. The club committee had hopes for using the proceeds of the 1938–39 Cup run to secure a private ground, but those plans were scuppered by World War 2.

== Honours ==
- Scottish Qualifying Cup
  - Runners-up: 1935–36, 1937–38
- Perthshire League
  - Champions: 1919–20, 1933–34, 1934–35, 1935–36, 1936–37
  - Runners-up: 1937–38, 1941–42
- Perthshire Cup
  - Winners: 1919–20. 1923–24, 1933–34, 1934–35, 1935–36, 1937–38, 1938–39
  - Runners-up: 1920–21, 1921–22, 1936–37, 1939–40
- Perthshire Consolation Cup
  - Winners: 1931–32, 1932–33, 1941–42
