= Breadalbane F.C. =

Association football club in Renfrewshire, Scotland

Breadalbane
- Full name: Breadalbane Football Club
- Founded: 1880
- Ground: Home Street
- Coordinates: 56°37′23″N 3°51′50″W
- League: Perthshire Amateur Football League
Home colours

Breadalbane Football Club is an association football club from Aberfeldy in Scotland.

== History ==
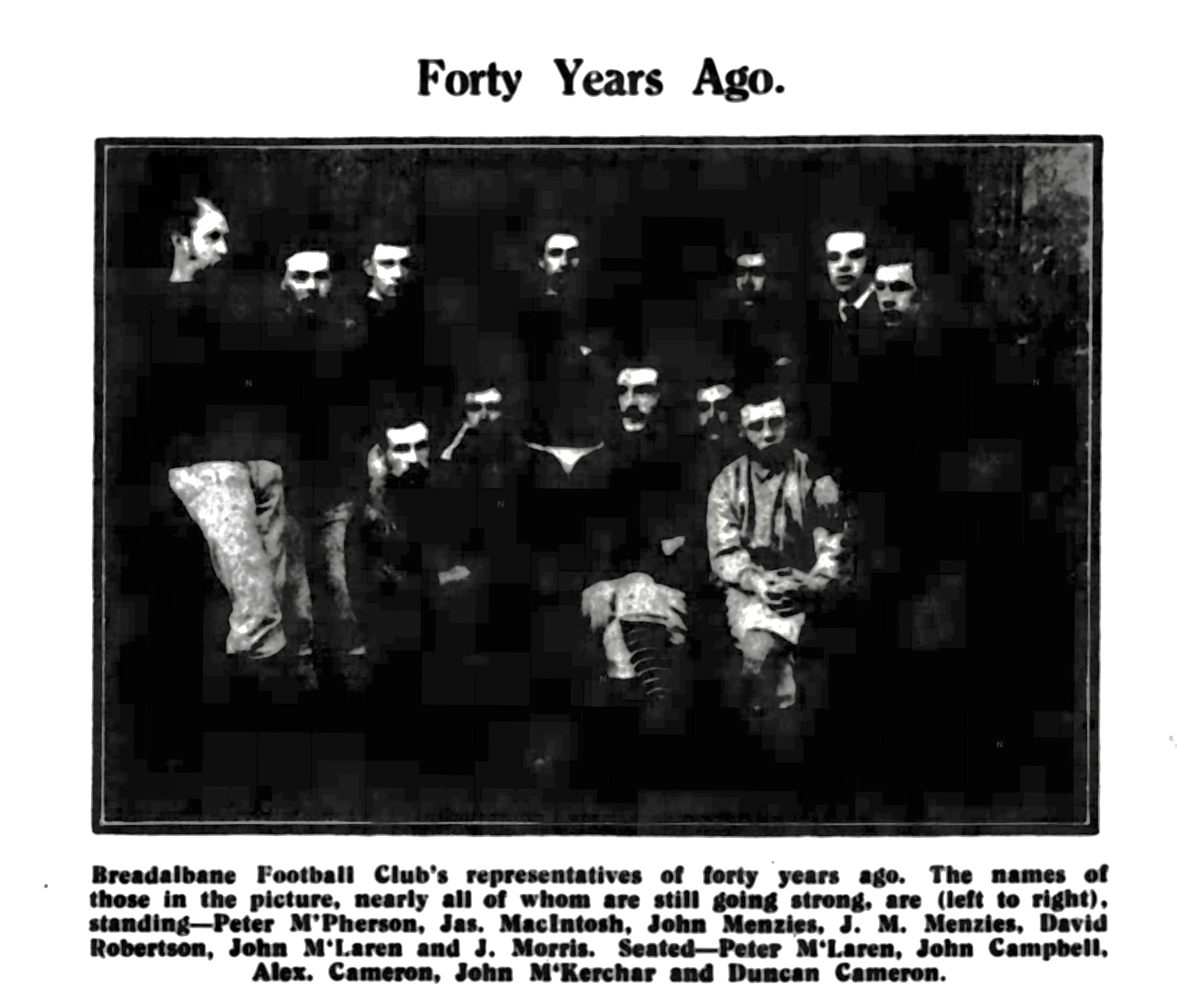
The Breadalbane football side of 1884 from the Perthshire Advertiser, 17 May 1924

Although a form of 'mob' football had been played in the town, the association game was introduced to Aberfeldy by bank clerks, with the first club being called Breadalbane Rangers; one of the founders was a clerk named Fisher, who had played for a club of the same name in Edinburgh in 1875. In response the "artisan" men founded their own club, initially called Aberfeldy Breadalbane, in 1880, and sometimes referred to simply as Aberfeldy, but becoming Breadalbane by the mid-1880s. Rangers did not last long as its players gradually joined the new club.

The club entered the Scottish Cup from 1882–83 to 1885–86 but only played one tie; a 7–0 defeat to Vale of Teith in 1884.

The club started to enter again in 1903–04, by which time smaller clubs had to start with the Scottish Qualifying Cup, and the club won through the qualifying rounds every season from 1922–23 to 1925–26, plus 1928–29, albeit the club never won more than one Qualifying Cup tie in each of those seasons, relying on byes to reach the main competition. The club lost in the first round proper on every occasion. Twice the club lost 10–0 to Falkirk, the first tie in 1923 seeing Syd Puddefoot score five goals, although the club made £100 simply by selling the right to host the tie to the Bairns. The club continued to enter the competition until World War 2.

The club has the unenviable record of most appearances in the first round proper of the Cup without scoring a goal, with six. No other club has more than three.

Breadalbane was a member of the small Atholl League in the 1900s and the larger Perthshire League until the latter's end in 1957; the club won the championship on nine occasions, including the final two. Since then it has been in the Perthshire Amateur League, winning the title three times, most recently in 2005–06. The club has also won the Perthshire Cup on several occasions, first entering in 1884–85 but not winning the trophy until 1936–37, with a 4–1 win over Blairgowrie; the team was met at the east end of the town after the win in the second (away) leg by the Aberfeldy Pipe Band. The club won the competition every season from 1956–67 to 1962–63.

== Colours ==
The club's traditional colours are blue shirts and white shorts, which in 1884–85 was a dark blue, although until 1884 the shirts were one-inch blue and white hoops, with navy knickers.

== Ground ==
The club has played at Home Street since 1961. Its previous grounds were at Castle Menzies Park (until 1885) and Castle Weem Park.
