= Stanley F.C. (Perthshire) =

Former association football club in Scotland

Stanley Football Club
- Full name: Stanley
- Nickname(s): the Salmon Fishers, the Big County Club
- Founded: 1890
- Dissolved: 1958
- Ground: Recreation Ground
Home colours

Stanley Football Club was an association football club from the village of Stanley in Perthshire.

== History ==
The club claimed a foundation date of 1890, although its first recorded match dates from 1894, a 4–1 win at Perth District Asylum.

Stanley entered the Scottish Qualifying Cup for the first time in 1898–99, losing in the first round to St Johnstone. The club reached far enough in the Qualifying Cup to play in the Scottish Cup three times. The first time, in 1901–02, it lost 6–1 at Stenhousemuir, the Warriors scoring four times in the second half. The second time, two years later, the club was drawn to play Celtic; faced with an inevitable defeat, the club withdrew "for a consideration", allowing the Bhoys to play a more lucrative Scottish League match.

The final time was in 1910–11, when the club was drawn at home to Queen's Park. The Glasgow club offered Stanley £20 to switch the tie to Hampden Park, and, when Stanley demurred, the Scottish FA was persuaded to inspect the ground for suitability; the ground having been passed fit, Queen's Park offered Stanley £40 to switch the tie, but Stanley demanded £60 minimum, so the tie went ahead at the Recreation Ground, in front of a crowd of 1,000. Queen's Park duly won 6–1, going in at half-time 5–0 up, and indulging in such "gallery play" that the Spiders' goalkeeper M'Kenna missed a penalty.

The club continued to enter the Scottish Cup until 1919, scratching from its first qualifying round tie with Scone. In 1920 the club became a Junior club, so was no longer eligible to enter the Qualifying Cup, and in 1930 an amateur club.

=== Local football ===
The club was a founder member of the Perthshire League in 1897–98. By 1908, the club had won the title four times, but it did not play in the league after the First World War as the league counted as a senior competition, so the club was not eligible once it turned junior.

The club had a considerable rivalry with Blairgowrie in the 1910s, with matches affected by violence and pitch invasions, apparently provoked by a Blairgowrie man replacing a Stanley man on the Scottish Football Association's committee. The most outstanding example being a general mêlée in the Perthshire League game on 28 March 1914, in which the sending-off of Blairgowrie's Richardson, and his attempt to assault the referee, provoked a mass fight that saw Richardson prosecuted and fined £2.

As a Junior club, Stanley won the Constitution Cup twice, in 1924 and 1926, but struggled to find a suitable league competition, playing variously in the Perth District, Perth County, Strathmore, Midland, and Dundee & District Junior Leagues. On turning amateur in 1930, the club joined the Perthshire Amateur League, in which it played until 1958. After finishing bottom of the league in 1957–58, the club disbanded.

== Colours ==
The club's colours were maroon shirts.

== Ground ==
The club played at the Recreation Ground in the village. The area was surrounded by a 4' tall hedge, and the pitch itself 100 yards from the road, preventing passers-by from getting a free view.
