= Fair City Athletic F.C. =

Association football club in Scotland

Fair City Athletic
- Full name: Fair City Athletic Football Club
- Nicknames: the Athletics, City, F.C.A.
- Founded: 1884
- Dissolved: 1902
- Ground: Balhousie Park
- Secretary: Archie Young
Home colours

Fair City Athletic Football Club was a football club from Perth in Scotland. It was one of the top two clubs in Perth in the 1890s but a disastrous ground move led to the club's dissolution in 1902.

== History ==
The club was founded in November 1884 under the name Fair City Athletics. The club's name was indiscriminately reported as Athletic and Athletics over the club's existence. The Athletics' first recorded match was a 7–1 win over Balhousie of Perth at the South Inch in December 1884.

=== Cup competitions ===
The club entered the first Perthshire Cup in 1884–85 and lost to Dunblane F.C. in the semi-final by 13 goals to 1.

City joined the Scottish Football Association in 1886, which entitled the club to enter the Scottish Cup; its first entry to the Cup was in 1886–87, but it withdrew before playing its first round tie.

The F.C.A. became the top club in Perth, before the rise of St Johnstone. City first reached the Perthshire Cup final in 1886–87, losing to Coupar Angus. For the next two seasons, the club was runner-up to Dunblane. Fair City had beaten Dunblane in the 1887–88 Scottish Cup, and won the final later in the season on the South Inch (by now St Johnstone's ground) 7–4, scoring four times in the first ten minutes, and another two before the break. However, the referee, Mr Carmichael, had declared the surface unplayable due to ice before the match; the City players had added India-rubber strips to their boots to cope with the conditions, and Dunblane put in a pre-emptive protest. The Perthshire FA upheld the protest, and Dunblane won the replayed final 7–3, changing ends at half-time 5–1 to the good.

Fair City was the marginal favourite for the 1888–89 final, played at St Johnstone's Recreation Park. Fair City was 3–1 up after 20 minutes, and 4–3 up at half-time, but Dunblane scored three times in the second half to go 6–4 up in the dying minutes; although City pulled one back, Dunblane retained the trophy.

The 1888–89 Scottish Cup was the club's most successful, reaching the fourth round (last 26). The club welcomed Arbroath F.C. to Balhousie Park, but, in wretched conditions, the visitors were 3–0 up at half-time, and, although City pulled one goal back, Arbroath also struck the woodwork twice. In the 1890–91 Scottish Cup the club gained its biggest win in the competition, 11–0 at Crieff F.C., but Montrose F.C. knocked City out in the third round.

By now, St Johnstone had caught up with the Fair City within Perth. The Saints won the Perthshire Cup in 1889–90, and, when the clubs met in the 1890–91 Perthshire Cup, St Johnstone won 4–1. A demonstration of the changing fortunes came when the Northern League balloted members as to which of the two Perth clubs should be admitted as a member, and the Saints won the vote easily.

The Fair City finally won the Perthshire Cup in 1893–94, but by default, as St Johnstone refused to play the final; on the day of the match, City played Vale of Leven F.C. instead, winning 5–2 "to the surprise of everyone".

The club won the competition again in 1897–98, beating Rob Roy F.C. of Callander in a replayed final at Recreation Park. For the match, the club changed at the Waverley Park hotel, and, en routel, their brake lost a wheel and overturned, but fortunately none of the players was seriously injured.

The club successfully retained the trophy in 1898–99. The club hammered St Johnstone 9–0 in the semi-final, although the Saints were not fielding a first choice side, and beat Vale of Atholl F.C. 5–2 in the final at Recreation Park, in front of a record 3,000 crowd.

=== Leagues ===
The introduction of the Scottish League, requiring qualifying rounds for the Scottish Cup, adversely affected the club, as it never made the first round proper after 1891. The Athletics sought to play in an alternative league, and joined the Northern League in 1892. The club however finished bottom, with only 1 point from 17 games, and in two other attempts in the league (1895–96 and 1900–01) only won 8 matches out of 24. In between, F.C.A. played in the Central Football League, finishing second, but ahead of St Johnstone, in a five-club league in 1896–97; and the Central Football Combination, finishing in the bottom three, again ahead of St Johnstone, in 1897–98. At the end of the season, both Perth clubs failed re-election back into the Combination.

The club had a little more success in its first attempt at the Perthshire League, in 1899–1900, finishing second to Dunblane, but the competition only had five entrants.

=== End of the club ===
The expense of moving to a new ground in 1899 was a financial millstone. The club had the benefit of a large crowd from a visit by Celtic F.C. in April 1900, the visitors winning 7–1, and after the end of the season held a "sale of work" in the Masonic Hall in order to pay off debts as a result of "acquiring the large park". However the club remained in debt, not helped by falling levels of support over the 1899–1900 season.

Despite the financial difficulties, in September 1900 the club commissioned a new grandstand, capable of housing 350 spectators. The club's hopes of a Scottish Cup run ended in the fourth round of the Scottish Qualifying Cup, losing a two-goal lead to Forfar Athletic.

By the end of the 1900–01 season, the club's finances had taken such a turn for the worse, that the club was looking to sell Muirton Bank Park, despite the significant expenditure, to find somewhere closer to the city centre. City was also being sued by both the original Aberdeen club and Montrose F.C. for match guarantees. The club entered the Perthshire League for a second time in 1901–02, but by this time the competition was at a much lower ebb, made up of amateur sides, and Fair City was in such financial straits that the club was expelled for not fulfilling its fixtures.

Towards the end of the season, St Johnstone agreed to play a benefit match "in order to assist the City officials out of their troubles". The club remained on the SFA roll for 1902–03 but the benefit match against St Johnstone - which the Saints won 3–1 - is the last recorded match for the club. The club did enter the Qualifying Cup for 1902–03 but scratched to Crieff Morrisonians F.C. in the first round.

=== Supporters ===
The City supporters were notorious for their conduct. The club's first-ever competitive match, against Pullars Rangers in the 1884–85 Perthshire Cup, was re-played because of their continual pitch invasions. After the 1888 Perthshire Cup final, Dunblane supporters had to buy "Play Up, City" favours to place in their hats, in order to "obtain freedom from unpleasant attention" from the crowd.

In 1889–90, three weeks after beating Coupar Angus 8–0 in the Scottish Cup, the Athletics were 5–3 down at the same side in the Perthshire Cup, with ten minutes remaining, City supporters invaded the pitch in protest at an injury, and the four policemen present were unable to clear them; the aftermath left the village "in a state of riot" after 200 City followers ran amok, "and no wonder; everybody knows what Fair City "rowdies" are like." The result was allowed to stand despite an Athletics protest against rough play, considered ironic given "there is not a dirtier team going".

In an 1893 match against St Johnstone, one of the City fans threw stones at the Saints' players.

== Second club ==
A senior club of the same name was formed in 1935, but only lasted for two seasons, winding up before playing in the Qualifying Cup in 1937–38.

== Colours ==
The club's colours were black and white "stripes" (in the context of the time, this referred to hoops), with white shorts until 1888 and navy afterwards.

== Ground ==
The club played at the following grounds:

- 1884–85: South Inch (opposite Scott Street)
- 1885–90: Balhousie Park (original at Dunkeld Road)
- 1890–October 1898: Balhousie Park (second on the north side of Shields Factory)
- December 1898–January 1899: South Inch
- February 1899–May 1901: Muirton Bank Park
- September 1901 – 1902: North Inch

In February 1885, the club played its Perthshire Cup replay against Pullars Rangers on the latter's ground at the Hillyland skating pond, and the club used it as its home ground for the remainder of the season. Given the unsatisfactory drainage on the ground, the club rented its new ground, soon to be called Balhousie Park, just to the north of the Wallace Works, on the Dunkeld Road, from the 1885–86 season.

The club was forced to move before the 1890–91 season, as the old Balhousie was wanted for building works; the new ground was between the Wallace Works and public baths, and "a few yards" from the old one, so therefore given the same name. It was however not as satisfactory, and originally had a cinder pitch.

City was evicted from Balhousie a second time in November 1898, and used the Perth Academy Former Pupils' ground at South Inch as a temporary venue. The club's new ground was held on a 9-year tenancy from a Mr Cunningham at Atholl Bank farm. The new ground - called Muirton Bank Park - was ready for use from February 1899.

== Notable players ==
- Andrew Moir, future Hibernian F.C. striker
- Jimmie Buchan, future Manchester City player
- Mick M'Keown, former Scotland international, played for Fair City at the end of his career
- Jim Jeffrey, sold to Dundee F.C. in 1901, later of Millwall F.C.
- Alex Robertson, later of Manchester United
