= Vale of Atholl F.C. =

Association football club in Renfrewshire, Scotland

Vale of Atholl FC
- Full name: Vale of Atholl Football Club
- Nickname(s): the Vale
- Founded: 1878
- Ground: Recreation Park
- League: Perthshire Amateur Football League
Home colours

Vale of Atholl Football Club is a football club from Pitlochry in Scotland.

== History ==
The club was founded in 1878, originally under the name Vale of Athole, a name it used until 1889.

The club was one of the inaugural clubs to take part in the Scottish Amateur Cup and as at 2022 is one of the three remaining clubs still entering the competition, although it has never reached the final.

The club's main historical significance is as an entrant to the Scottish Cup from 1882 to 1884 and 1888 to 1966. The club did so without any success. The Vale reached the second round proper on only two occasions, the first time in 1883–84, after first round opponents Aberfeldy Breadalbane scratched. The Vale in turn scratched from the second round tie with Dundee Harp F.C.

The club won through the qualifying rounds in 1907–08, 1921–22, 1922–23, and 1926–27, before the club finally won its first tie in the competition proper in 1927–28, beating Newton Stewart F.C. 2–1 in the first round; the club lost at St Mirren F.C. in the second, startling the home side by equalizing an early St Mirren goal after Kirk headed a cross from Watson, but conceding a further four goals despite a "heroic" defence.

The Vale only reached the first round once more via the qualifying rounds, in 1934–35, being drawn to play Hibernian F.C. at home. The club forfeited home advantage to play at Easter Road, and lost 5–0 in front of a crowd of 3,815. In 1954–55, the Scottish Football Association briefly re-organized the competition, by abolishing the qualifying rounds and putting the lower-ranked entrants in the Cup at the first round stage. This lasted three seasons and the Vale lost in the first round every time, the last time 8–2 at Albion Rovers.

Despite being an amateur club in an amateur league, the Vale retained its senior status until it was expelled from the Scottish Cup qualifying rounds for 1966–67. This was because the Highland Games were taking place at the Recreation Park when the Scottish FA was demanding its use for Cup ties. Having lost its senior status, the club was never in a high enough league to regain it.

The club won the amateur Perthshire League six times between 1920 and 1931; its last triumph in the competition was in 1972. The club was also a 11-time winner of the Perthshire Cup, although that competition was abandoned in 1975. For the 2022–23 season the club is playing in the second division of the Perthshire Amateur Football League.

== Colours ==
The club's known colours are as follows:

Vale of Atholl colours
Years	Shirts	Shorts
1878–84	Red and white	Navy
1889–90	White	Athole tartan
1890–1913	White	Navy
1913–14	Gold and red	
1914–15	Gold and black	
1915–16	White	
1916–19	Yellow and black	
1919–2018?	White	Black
2018–	Black & white hoops	Black

== Ground ==
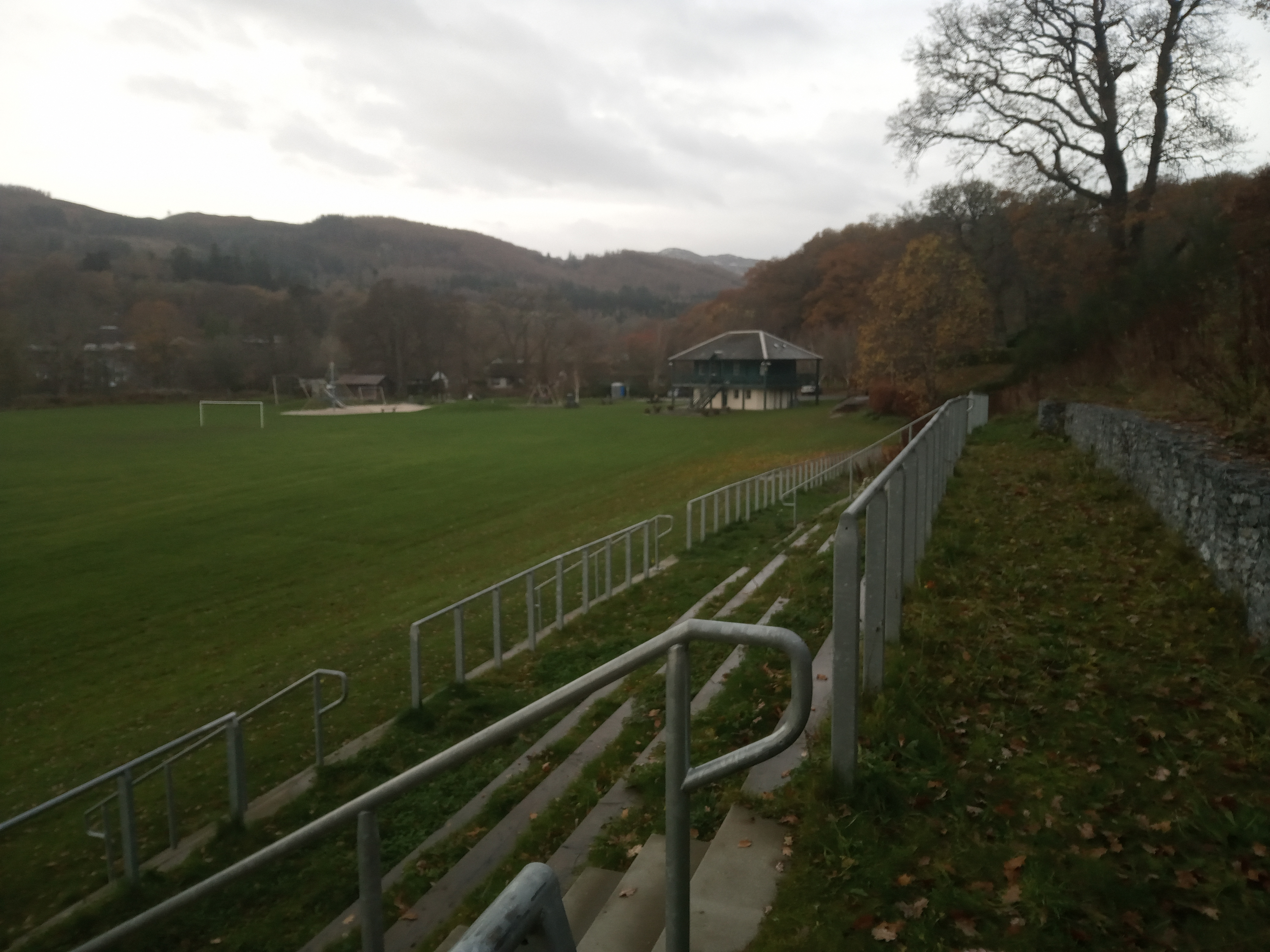
Pitlochry Recreation Park

The club played at the original Recreation Park in Pitlochry, which now lies at the bottom of Loch Faskally, the area being flooded in 1947 after a dam was built. The club removed its pavilion for reconstruction at a new Recreation Park.

== Notable players ==
The most famous Vale player is Paul Sturrock, who played for the club in 1973–74, and the following players also played for Scottish League clubs:

- Jimmy Gourlay (scorer of the winning goal for Morton in the 1922 Scottish Cup Final)
- Marty Wilson (Brechin)
- Aya Thorne (Forfar Athletic)
- Derek Dewar (Arbroath F.C.)
- Barclay Gunn (Dundee Utd)
- Stevie Fullarton (St Johnstone, Brechin)
- Davie Gillies (Dunfermline Athletic)
- Kenny Seaton (Dunfermline Athletic)
- Bill Rutherford (Hibernian)
- Bogdan Darabus (CS Minaur Baia Mare, Romania)
- János Tompa (Tiszakécske FC, Hungary)

=== Domestic ===
Scotland

- Perthshire League
  - First place (7): 1920-21,1925–26,1927–28,1928–29,1929-30,1931-32,1948–49
- Atholl League
  - Winners (2): 1905-06,1906-07
- North Perthshire League
  - Winners (2): 1921-22,1922-23
- Perthshire Amateur League
  - Winners (2): 1970-71,1971-72
- Perthshire Cup
  - Winners (11): 1896-97,1921-22,1922–23,1932–33,1948-49,1955-56,1970-71,1971-72,1972-73,2011-12.
- Atholl Cup
  - Winners (31): 1887-88,1888-89,1889-90 1890-91,1891-92,1893-94,1895-96,1896-97,1897-98,1902-03,1903-04,1904-05,1919-20,1922-23,1924-25,1925-26,1927-28,1928-29,1929-30,1932-33,1933-34,1934-35,1935-36,1936-37,1937-38,1938-39,1947-48,1952-53,1953-54,1955-56,2011-12
- Scottish Cup
  - Second Round (1): 1928–29
