= Dunblane F.C. =

Former association football club in Scotland

Dunblane
- Full name: Dunblane Football Club
- Nickname(s): the Heather
- Founded: 1878
- Dissolved: 1915
- Ground: Duckburn Park
Home colours

Dunblane Football Club was an association football team from Dunblane, within the historic county of Perthshire, which entered the Scottish Cup for nearly three decades.

== History ==
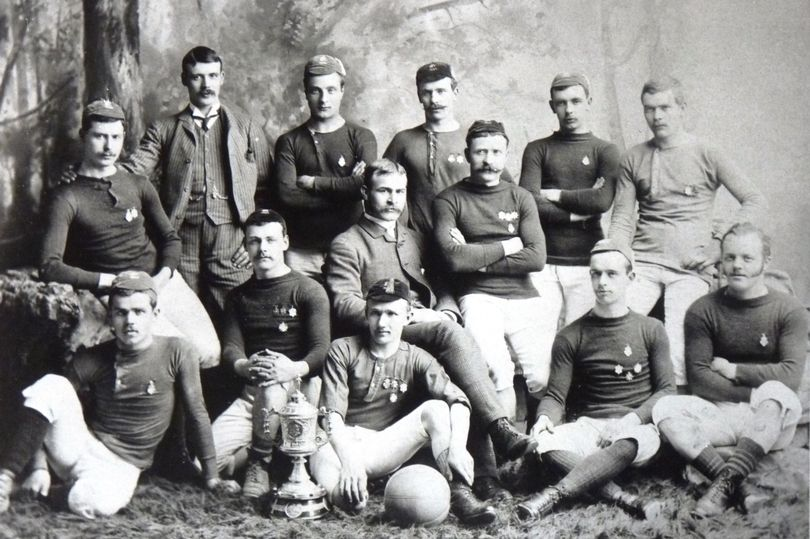
Dunblane Football Club, 1889

The club was formed in 1878, its first match against external opposition being against the Vale of Menteith side from Thornhill in June 1879; the club's first goals, in its second match against Bridge of Allan F.C. the following week, came from 13 year old Robert Christie, who would later play for Scotland.

The club first entered the Scottish Cup in 1881–82, losing in the first round to Vale of Teith F.C.; at the time the club was temporarily called the Dunblane Wanderers to distinguish from a junior side in the town.

The club's first substantial Cup run came the following year, reaching the fourth round (which, that year, was the final 22). The club's original 3–1 win at Coupar Angus F.C. in the first round was turned into a 3–3 draw after Coupar Angus protested about two disallowed goals; Dunblane won the second game 6–1. Dunblane also survived a protest from Arbroath F.C. after the second round but went out at home to the powerful 3rd Lanarkshire Rifle Volunteer side in the fourth, despite the support of a "loud-tongued and not too select" crowd. The club reached the same stage in 1883–84, this time made up of 21 clubs, but lost 6–1 at home to Rangers.

Although the Heather fell one stage sooner in 1884–85, the season saw the first edition of the Perthshire Cup, with 11 entries; Dunblane won the competition thanks to beating Vale of Teith in the final, at the Hillyland Skating Pond in Perth, before 1,000 spectators, coming from 3–0 down to win 4–3.

The club would win the Perthshire Cup on ten occasions, six of them coming by 1892, but the rise of St Johnstone F.C. effectively usurped the club as the leading side in the county. The club's high point on the national stage came in 1886–87, by reaching the final 16 of the Scottish Cup for the only time, albeit the run included a bye and a walkover after Dundee East End F.C. scratched from a third round replay.

After the introduction of preliminary rounds and the Scottish Qualifying Cup in the 1890s, the club reached the main rounds of the Scottish Cup four times, three times being Qualifying Cup semi-finalists. The club struggled in the wake of professional clubs above them and Junior clubs below them, and by 1914 was struggling to raise a team; a 6–0 defeat to the Crieff Morrisonians F.C. in January 1914, with only ten men turning up, was the club's last competitive match.

The club did enter the national and local competitions in 1914–15, but, as so many players had signed up for World War 1, the club resolved in September not to play any matches for the season. The club was struck off the Scottish FA roll in August 1915.

=== League football ===
The club played in two leagues:

- Midland League/Central Combination from 1891 to 1903;
- Central League - a spin-off of the Midland League - from 1903 to 1905;
- Midland League once more from 1908 to 1911.

Apart from the first season in 1891–92, when Dunblane was runners-up to Raith Rovers F.C., the club struggled in the Midland League, normally finishing near the bottom, but did win the Central League in 1903–04. However that competition only had three teams in it and Dunblane took the title having won one match, as the club was awarded another after Strathallan (which, until 1901, was the Dunblane reserve side) did not turn up.

== Colours ==
The club originally played in "bright scarlet" shirts and white shorts, with the shorts changing to navy from 1892. The red shirts gave the club its nickname of the Heather.

== Ground ==
The club played at Kippenross Park until 1887 and Duckburn Park afterwards.

== Notable players ==
- The brothers Robert and Alexander Christie were both capped for Scotland after leaving the club.
- James Fyfe, Arsenal F.C. player, played for Dunblane in 1898
- David Henderson, joined Liverpool F.C. from Dunblane in 1893
- Archibald McGeoch, centre-forward, joined Arsenal from Dunblane in 1897

== Honours ==
Scottish Cup

- Best run: last 16, 1886–87

Perthshire Cup

- Winners: 1884–85, 1885–86, 1887–88, 1888–89, 1890–91, 1891–92, 1899–1900, 1900–01, 1903–04, 1905–06, 1909–10, 1912–13
- Runners-up: 1892–93, 1894–95, 1895–96, 1896–97, 1898–99, 1904–05, 1908–09

Stirling & District Charity Cup

- Winners: 1887

Central League

- Champions 1903–04
