= Perthshire Cup =

- Founded: 1884
- Abolished: 1975
- Region: Perthshire
- Most successful club(s): St Johnstone (24 titles)

The Perthshire Cup was an association football cup competition for clubs in the county of Perthshire, Scotland. The competition was founded in 1884 and was last competed for in the 1974–75 season.

== Format ==
The competition was a knock-out tournament contested by the member clubs of the Perthshire Football Association.

== Initial entrants ==
- Blairgowrie Our Boys
- Breadalbane
- Coupar Angus
- Crieff
- Dunblane
- Erin Rovers
- Fair City Athletic
- Pullar's Rangers
- Teith Bank Rovers
- Vale of Allan
- Vale of Teith

== History ==
The first draw for the competition took place on 20 December 1884, with clubs divided between eastern and western divisions. The first final was between Dunblane and Vale of Teith, at Fair City's ground at Hillyland in Perth. The Vale took a three-goal lead inside 20 minutes, but Dunblane pulled the score back to 3–3 by the 70th minute, and Laidlaw of Dunblane secured the trophy with a goal in the 83rd minute.

It was considered a senior competition in its early years, but the rise of the Scottish League and the attraction of players from the region meant that more and more amateur clubs took part; these clubs then had difficulties in surviving World War 1. By 1921–22 the competition only had six entrants, and the competition was invariably dominated by St Johnstone, as the only League club in the county, until it stopped entering in 1932–33.

The competition was last played for in 1974–75, although the name was revived for the North Perthshire Amateur Cup, which uses the Perthshire Cup as its trophy.

== Wins by club ==
Team	Wins	First win	Last win
Ballinluig	1	1968–69	1968–69
Black Watch	2	1939–40	1941–42
Blairgowrie Amateurs	7	1919–20	1938–39
Breadalbane	12	1936–37	1966–67
Coupar Angus	1	1886–87	1886–87
Dunblane	12	1884–85	1909–10
Dunkeld & Birnam	1	1924–25	1924–25
Fair City Athletic	3	1893–94	1898–99
Grandtully Vale	7	1947–48	1974–75
Murthly	1	1962–63	1962–63
St Johnstone	24	1889–90	1963–64
Vale of Atholl	10	1896–97	1972–73

Vale of Teith was runner-up four times between 1884–85 and 1906–07, never winning the competition. In 1906–07 it took St Johnstone to three replays before finally succumbing.
