= List of minor Scottish Qualifying Cup entrants =

This is a list of association football clubs which entered the Scottish Qualifying Cup between 1895 and 1939, which never made it through to the Scottish Cup proper, and which lack the prominence for their own Wikipedia pages.

== 2nd Scottish Rifles F.C. ==
2nd Scottish Rifles
- Full name: 2nd Scottish Rifles F.C.
- Nicknames: the Sodgers, the Rifles
- Founded: 1895
- Dissolved: 1918?
- Ground: Maryhill Barracks
Home colours

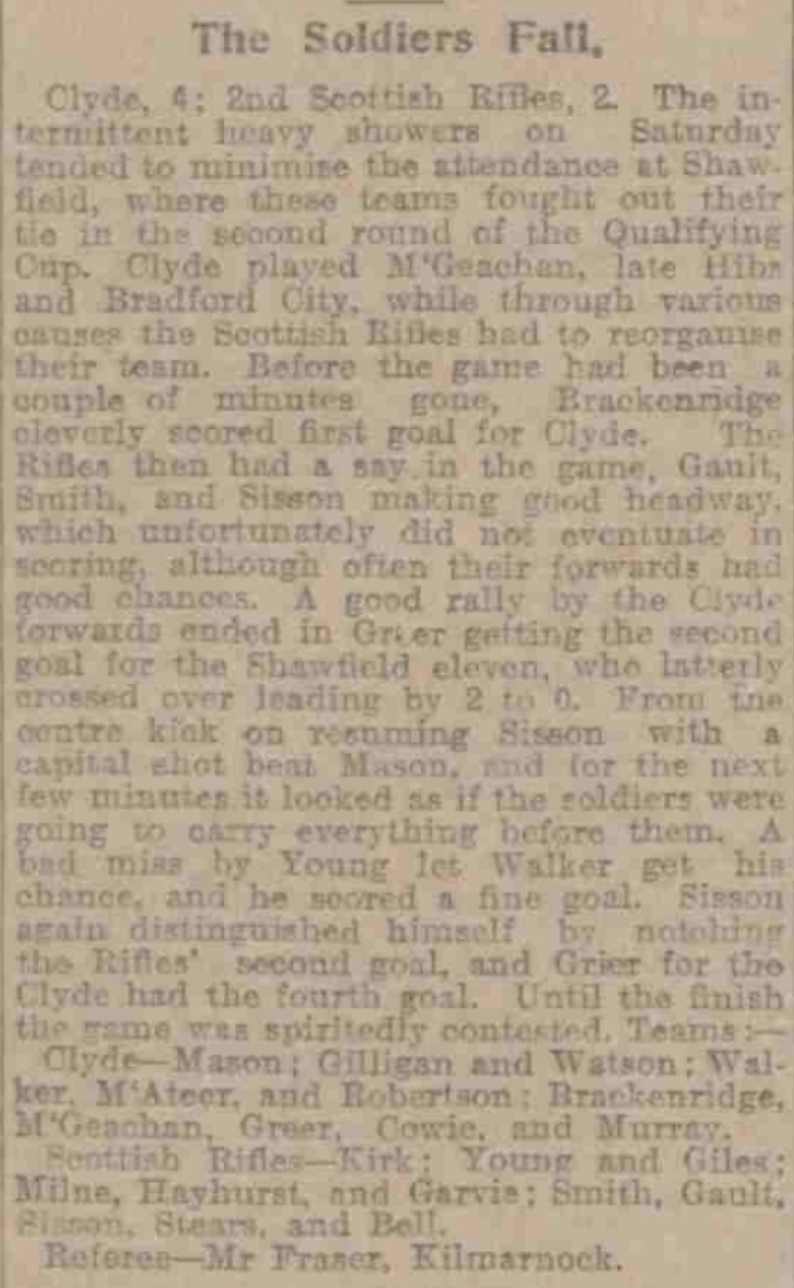
1906–07 Scottish Qualifying Cup 1st round, Clyde 4–2 2nd Scots Rifles, Scottish Referee, 17 September 1906

=== History ===
The club was formed from the Cameronians (Scottish Rifles) 2nd battalion; a volunteer battalion from the same regiment had been playing since the 1890s as the Cameronians, and the 2nd Rifles had a team at least by 1895, when the regiment was based in Parkhurst, Isle of Wight.

The club played in the Scottish Qualifying Cup in 1905–06, 1906–07, and 1914–15, when based in Glasgow, losing in the first two seasons to Clyde in its only ties, and scratching the final time; after losing to Clyde in the 1906–07 competition, the battalion was deployed to Aldershot, and played in the FA Amateur Cup.

The battalion continued playing football even during the First World War, winning a regimental tournament in France in 1915–16.

=== Colours ===
The club wore green and black, probably based on the regimental tartan.

=== Ground ===
The club played out of Maryhill Barracks when based in Glasgow.

== Allanvale F.C. ==
Allanvale
- Nickname: the Vale
- Founded: 1904
- Dissolved: 1913
- Ground: Public Park
- Hon. President: Graeme Whitelaw
- Match Secretary: James Haugh
- Captain: James King
Home colours

=== History ===
Allanvale F.C. was from the village of Blackford in Perthshire, and played junior football until joining the Scottish Football Association in May 1911. The club's most notable achievement as a junior club was twice reaching the final of the Perthshire Consolation Cup for clubs eliminated from the Perthshire Cup before the final. In 1906–07 (the club's first season in both competitions) it lost to Tulloch 2–0 in a replay, after drawing the original final at Crieff – a plan to play extra-time was scuppered by the Allanvale side needing to catch trains back to Blackford. It also lost 2–1 to Stanley in the final in 1909–10, played at Perth, having taken the lead after M'Feat scored from a corner, but conceded twice in the second half.

The club played twice in the Scottish Qualifying Cup, losing 6–1 to Crieff Morrisonians in the first round in 1911–12, and 3–2 at home to Huntingtower in the first round in 1912–13. The club also entered the West Perthshire League in 1911–12, but the competition was never finished – fortunately for Allanvale as it had lost all of its four matches.

The club appears to have ceased operations before the First World War, resigning its Scottish FA membership in August 1913, but the name continued as a juvenile football club in the 1920s, winning the Crieff and District Juvenile Cup in 1921.

=== Colours ===
The club wore green jerseys.

=== Ground ===
The club played on a public park in Blackford.

== Annan F.C. (1896) ==
Annan
- Founded: 1896
- Dissolved: 1902
- Ground: Caledonian Park
- Match Secretary: George A. Carruthers, William J. Rae
| to 1900 colours | from 1900 colours |

=== History ===
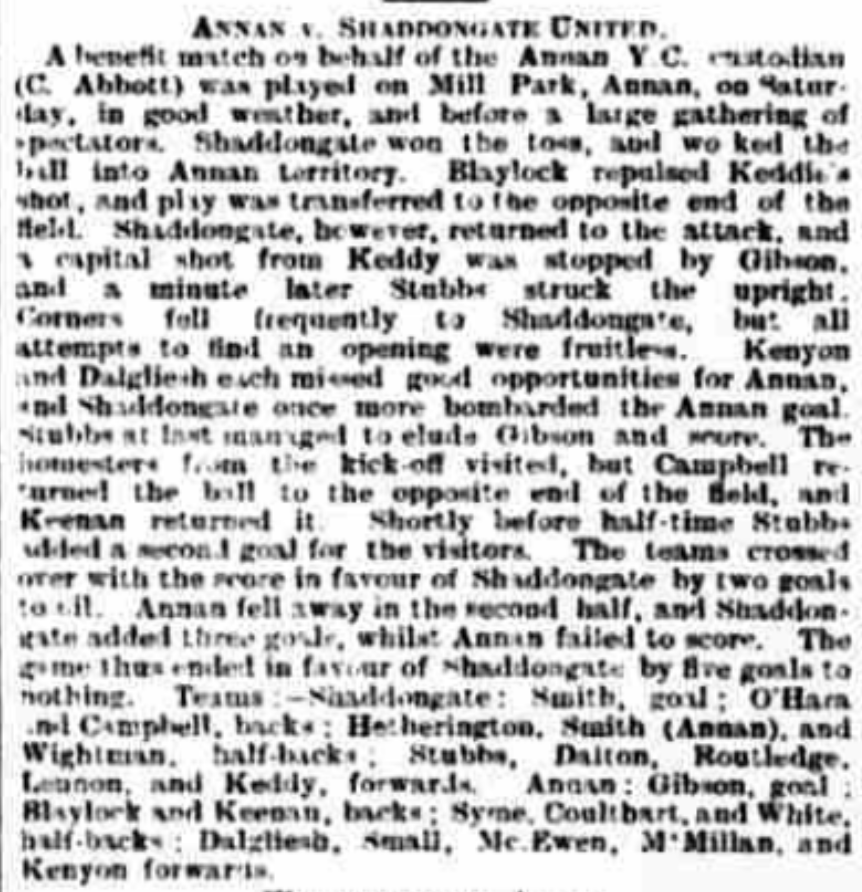
Report of a friendly between Shaddongate United (now Carlisle United) and Annan, Carlisle Journal, 4 January 1901

Annan F.C. was an association football club from Annan, Dumfries and Galloway, active in the late 19th century. It was the second club of that name, and was founded in the wake of the dissolving of the previous Annan, under the name Rose of Annan F.C., as a junior club. Its earliest recorded match is a 10–0 victory over the 34th Regiment of Carlisle in November 1896.

In 1898, the club changed its name to Annan and joined the Scottish Football Association, and also had the advantage of gaining some players from rival junior club Border Annan which had "gone to the wall". The club entered the Scottish Qualifying Cup for the first time that season, and beat Nithsdale of Dumfries in the first round, but lost at home to Wigtown in the second. The club also entered the Southern Counties Cup for the first time, losing 7–3 at home to Newton Stewart Athletic in the semi-final.

The club was further strengthened in 1899 by the collapse of Carlisle City AFC, and recruited Young, Burgess, Russell, and Graham from the defunct English side, and caused something of a shock in the Qualifying Cup, beating Dumfries Hibernians 3–0 in the first round, contrary to all expectations; the club lost at Dumfries in the second, putting up a strong fight before the home side's superior fitness told. Hibs gained revenge with a 5–0 win in the second round of the County competition.

With a second club in the town (Annan United) having ambitions on seniority, Annan was humiliated 12–1 by Douglas Wanderers in the first round of the 1900–01 Qualifying Cup, albeit it did beat Thornhill in the Southern Counties, enough to put the club in the semi-final. In the last four Annan again conceded seven, but this time scoring four, in its tie against the 6th Galloway Volunteer side.

Annan's position in the local district was put into perspective by its appearances in the Dumfries & Galloway Cup – it lost every tie it played in its three entries from 1898 to 1900. The club did not play football in the 1901–02 season and was struck from the Scottish FA roll of members in August 1902.

=== Colours ===
The club originally wore light blue jerseys, changing in 1902 to crimson and primrose.

=== Ground ===
The club originally played at Caledonian Park. The club planned to move to Seaforth Park in 1899, but instead moved to Mill Park.

== Annan United F.C. ==
Annan United
- Founded: 1896
- Dissolved: 1904
- Ground: Caledonian Park
- Match secretary: W. Boyd
Home colours

=== History ===
The club, from Annan, Dumfriesshire, was founded in 1896 as a junior side, with matches reported from 1897.

United soon became one of the strongest junior sides in the area, winning its first 8 matches of the 1899–1900 season, The club successfully applied to join the Scottish Football Association in June 1901, which meant it could play in the three senior competitions open to it – the Scottish Qualifying Cup, Southern Counties Cup, and Dumfries & Galloway Cup – for the first time in 1901–02.

United played in each competition for three seasons, but only won four ties – two in the 1902–03 Dumfries & Galloway Cup, and one each in the other competitions. Its biggest win was 5–1 against Barholm Rovers in the first round of the 1901–02 Qualifying Cup.

The club's last appearance in senior football was in the Qualifying Cup draw for 1904–05; United "failed to get up a team" for its tie with Thornhill and, not having played all season, the club was struck from the Scottish FA roll in August 1905.

=== Colours ===
The club played in black and white.

=== Ground ===
United's ground was Caledonian Park, the former home of Annan F.C. (1896).

== Benburb F.C. (Loanhead) ==
Benburb
- Nicknames: the Irishmen, the Bens
- Founded: 1896
- Dissolved: 1898
- Ground: Benburb Football Park
- Match Secretary: G. McManus, J. Donoughie
Home colours

=== History ===
The club was founded in Loanhead, Midlothian, in 1896. Its first recorded match was a 3–1 defeat at home to Bonnyrigg Rose. The club's name and colours show that it was founded in the interests of Irish diaspora workers, but the club did not have an exclusionary policy of selection – many of its players had "Scots" names such as Torrance, Cunningham, Gordon, and Porteous.

Benburb joined the Scottish Football Association in August 1896. It entered four senior competitions that season, namely the Scottish Qualifying Cup, East of Scotland Shield, King Cup, and Midlothian League. The Bens lost in the first round in each knockout tournament; lost 7–0 to Cowdenbeath in the Qualifying, and 4–1 and 6–0 to Penicuik Athletic in the Shield and King Cup respectively.

Benburb was at least a little unfortunate that the Qualifying Cup tie clashed with a home game for the established Loanhead side Polton Vale, so the Benburb committee accepted an offer of half of the gate, plus 15 rail fares, to switch the match to Cowdenbeath. One early note of concern was that, even without the Vale playing in opposition, Benburb could only attract a meagre crowd for its Shield tie; Benburb's Edward Green received his marching orders in the tie, along with Athletic's Alexander White, for fighting.

Benburb however did win twice in the Shield's Consolation Cup, thereby reaching the semi-final, although again its tie with Trinity had a disappointing attendance; but lost again to Penicuik at that stage.

These two victories were the club's only wins in competitive football. It lost all of its four games in the Midlothian League, only scoring one goal.

Although Benburb renewed its memberships for 1897–98, it scratched from the Qualifying Cup and East of Scotland Shield, and did not enter the King Cup. After a season without playing it was struck from the relevant membership rolls.

=== Colours ===
The club wore green shirts and blue knickers.

=== Ground ===
The club's ground was the former Polton Vale ground at Ramsay Square; under Benburb's tenancy, it was simply known as the Benburb Football Park.

== Berwick United F.C. ==
Berwick United
- Nickname: United
- Founded: 1919
- Dissolved: 1920
- Ground: Union Park
- Hon. President: Alderman P. P. Boston
- President: A. A. Crisp
- Match Secretary: G. V. Nicholson
| Home colours | Away colours |

=== History ===
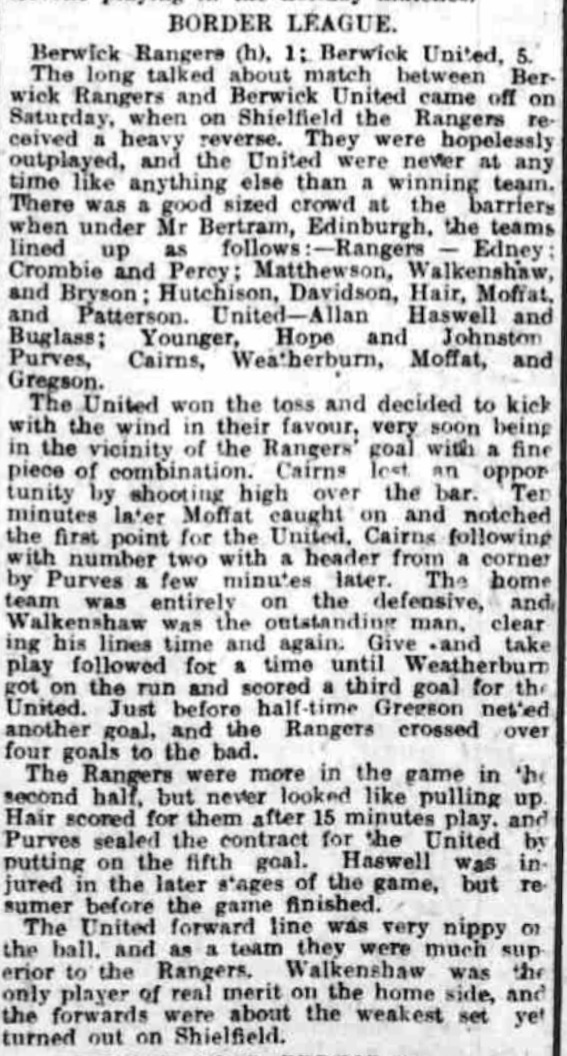
1919–20 Border League, Berwick Rangers 1–5 Berwick United, Berwick Advertiser, 26 December 1919

Similarly to Berwick Rangers, Berwick United was an association football team from Berwick-upon-Tweed, in England, but which played its football in Scotland. The club was founded in 1919, at a time when it was uncertain if Rangers would re-start after the First World War; A. A. Crisp, who was a player with the Thursday Rangers side, which in turn had lost players to the new Spittal Hearts side, proposed at a meeting of "those interested" that the Berwick Rangers assets (mostly cash in the bank) be handed over to the Hearts, with a view to amalgamating the Berwick sides as a new Berwick United club. It was eventually decided that the Berwick Comrades club should take over the assets and the Rangers name, so Crisp and the Spittal Hearts resolved to turn senior as Berwick United.

The club duly joined the Scottish Football Association in August 1919, and it warmed up for its first competitive tie (in the East of Scotland Shield qualifying cup) with a 3–0 win over the K.O.S.B. The club duly won 2–1 at Coldstream in the Shield tie, two goals from Fenby turning the tie around, but its debut in the Scottish Qualifying Cup at Vale of Leithen showed the gap to close, United missing a penalty when 1–0 down, and ultimately going down 5–0. Before September was out, the club was also eliminated from the Shield, thanks to missing two penalties in a 2–1 home defeat to Gala Fairydean.

Coldstream gained a revenge in the first round of the King Cup with a 2–1 home win, United twice hitting the woodwork, and the key goal scored after goalkeeper Weatherburn dropped a shot at the feet of Melrose.

The first meeting between United and Berwick Rangers took place at Shielfield Park just before Christmas, in the Border League, and United won 5–1. However, with Rangers bottom of the League and United with a mediocre record, the tide turned towards an amalgamation of the two sides. The clubs were drawn together in the first round of the Border Cup and drew 3–3 at Union Park; United won the replay 1–0. A win over Coldstream put United in the final, against Peebles Rovers at Innerleithen, in front of 1,100 spectators, and Purves gave United the lead with a volley from the right wing. However luck went against United in the second half, an injury to Abbot in the United goal – who was having a "great" game – interrupting the club's rhythm, Purves hitting the bar with a cross-shot, and Rovers equalised in the 76th minute, winning the game thanks to a penalty six minutes later after Johnston "fell on the ball with his arm".

The club was at least prominent enough to attract Newcastle United to a friendly towards the end of the season (albeit Berwick went down 9–1), but it suffered a blow when centre-forward Maxwell – awarded the Military Medal during the season, for escaping a prisoner of war camp in 1914 – was signed up by Hibernian.

However the club suffered a more serious blow in July, when Berwick Rangers announced it had secured Union Park for the following season, and the United players and committee therefore threw in their lot with Rangers, United being struck off the Scottish FA roll in August 1920.

=== Colours ===
The club played in blue, with a white change shirt.

=== Ground ===
United played at Union Park, let to the club by Jack Robertson of Mill Farm, Tweedmouth.

== Bon Accord F.C. (1890) ==
Bon Accord
- Nickname: the Bons
- Founded: 1890
- Dissolved: 1905
- Ground: Central Park
- Secretary: J. Main Jr
Home colours

=== History ===
The Aberdeen club was founded in September 1890 as Junior Bon-Accord. As the name suggests it was a Junior club, unrelated to the senior. Its greatest honour as a junior club was winning the Figaro Cup (for junior and senior reserve clubs) two years in succession (1893–94 and 1894–95).

In 1903, the club joined the Scottish Football Association, at the same time as the three existing senior clubs in Aberdeen (Aberdeen (1881), Victoria United, and Orion), merged as Aberdeen F.C. Unlike Aberdeen, the Bon Accord senior side was mostly amateur. The club however had recruited six of the former Victoria United players and it had apparently won over the Victoria support, with fans shouting "Play up Vics!" at early matches.

The club was lucky with a bye in the first round of the Scottish Qualifying Cup, and its first senior match was a 2–1 win over Lochgelly United – who had also received a bye – on the date the other fixtures took place. The Bons lost 5–1 to Aberdeen in the second round, Aberdeen not getting out of second gear. After the match the club lost left-back William Brabner to Aberdeen via transfer, and another player, James Robertson, approached Aberdeen after the match seeking one for himself; Bon Accord complained that Aberdeen had set up an "A" side for the sole purpose of denuding the club of its players, but the Scottish FA ordered the transfer, as the Bons had promised him a free should another club be interested.

The Bons had the chance of revenge in the final of the Aberdeenshire Cup, which it had entered for the first time, and beat Aberdeen University and Peterhead in its two preceding ties. 2,000 people turned out at Pittodrie for the final, but Aberdeen dominated the first half, gaining a 2–0 lead; Ferries pulled a goal back, but M'Bean in goal rushed out to clear a long ball and missed his kick entirely, M'Aulay putting the Bons 3–1 down. Milne scored a consolation near the end.

The club only lasted a single season as a senior club, being struck from the Scottish FA roll (albeit to some surprise) in August 1904 as having "come to the conclusion that it is no use trying to fight the combine." It continued playing over the next couple of seasons, its last recorded match being a defeat at Aberdeen "A" in the first round of the Aberdeen & District Cup in 1905–06.

=== Colours ===
The club wore blue jerseys. For its final matches the club changed to black and white.

=== Ground ===
The club originally played at the Links, but as a senior club its ground was Central Park, also the ground of Aberdeen.

== Broxburn St John's F.C. ==
Broxburn St John's
- Founded: 1921
- Dissolved: 1935
- Ground: Sports Park
- President & Captain: Fergus Byrne
| Home colours | Away colours |

=== History ===
The club had its origins in a Juvenile church side, founded in 1921, and affiliated to St John's Cantius Roman Catholic church in Broxburn. The club morphed into the Broxburn St John's C.Y.M.S. and won the first Scottish C.Y.M.S. Cup in 1932, beating Blantyre St Joseph's 1–0 on the ground of Parkhead Juniors thanks to a winner by Taylor in the 65th minute.

The club turned senior by joining the Scottish Football Association before the 1933–34 season, its first match as a senior club being an 8–4 defeat at Rosyth Recreation in the Edinburgh & District League. It entered the Scottish Qualifying Cup for the only time, getting a bye into the second round, and walked over Edinburgh University in the second; the club lost 7–1 at home to Vale of Leithen in the third after keeping the game tight in the first half but falling apart in the second, and the Vale gained entry to the Scottish Cup proper as a result of the win.

1933–34 was the club's only senior season. It finished fourth from bottom of the Edinburgh & District League, with 4 wins from 17 matches, and reached the semi-finals of the King Cup. In the first round, goals from Boyle, Armit, and Byrne getting the team from 2–0 down in the first round against Selkirk to win 3–2, and the club walked over Chirnside United which was unable to travel to a second replay at Selkirk; St John's lost 3–0 at eventual winners Clerwood Amateurs in the last four, Clerwood winning the toss being crucial, as St John's had to play into a strong wind in the first half and tired out too much to fight back in the second.

The club continued into 1934–35, but its only competitive football was a first round replay defeat in the East of Scotland Shield qualifying competition to Coldstream, the club having joined the association too late the previous year to play in the competition. Broxburn should have had home advantage for the original tie, but switched it to Coldstream, and came away with a 5–5 draw, but making the journey twice was too much for the side.

=== Colours ===
The club's first choice colours as a senior club were green, with a change strip of blue.

=== Ground ===
The club played at Broxburn's Sports Park; season tickets for 1933–34 cost 5 shillings, reduced to 1s for boys between 14 and 16, and 6d for those below.

== Carron Amateurs F.C. ==
Carron Amateurs
- Founded: 1904
- Dissolved: 1908
- Ground: Ochilview Park
- Hon. President: J. J. M'Laren
- President: James Alexander
- Secretaries: N. M. Whitehead and A. R. Scott
Home colours

=== History ===
The Stenhousemuir club was founded out of a cricket club, the Pate brothers being prominent in both sides. The first references to it playing football are from the 1904–05 season.

The club joined the Scottish Amateur Football League for the 1905–06 season, and the Scottish Football Association in May 1906, which entitled the club to play in the Scottish Qualifying Cup and the Stirlingshire Cup in 1906–07.

The club's first season as a senior club saw heavy defeats in its first round fixtures; in 1906–07, it lost 6–0 to East Stirlingshire in the Qualifying and 5–0 to King's Park in the Stirlingshire, albeit the "swanky, go-ahead" Amateurs were handicapped by an injury to the goalkeeper after half-an-hour of the latter match, with the game still scoreless. In 1907–08, Carron only lost 2–1 to Clackmannan in the Qualifying, even taking the lead through a long shot from Shearer, and the Clacks needed an 88th-minute penalty to win the game. However the club scratched from the Stirlingshire.

Its Amateur League campaigns were not much more successful, its debut season being one of mid-table mediocrity, but finishing in the bottom three (of ten clubs) in 1907–08.

The Amateurs gave up on football after the 1907–08 season, resigning from the Amateur League and, not having a private ground, not seeking to retain its Scottish FA membership, although it continued to play cricket. The name was later used by the Carron Works Recreation Club company side.

=== Colours ===
The club wore maroon and gold.

=== Ground ===
The club played at Ochilview, relying on Stenhousemuir F.C. not having a home fixture in order to play home games.

== Clydebank F.C. (1899) ==
Clydebank
- Nicknames: the Shipbuilders, the Bankers
- Founded: 1899
- Dissolved: 1901
- Ground: Hamilton Park
- Match secretary: John Hutcheson
Home colours

=== History ===
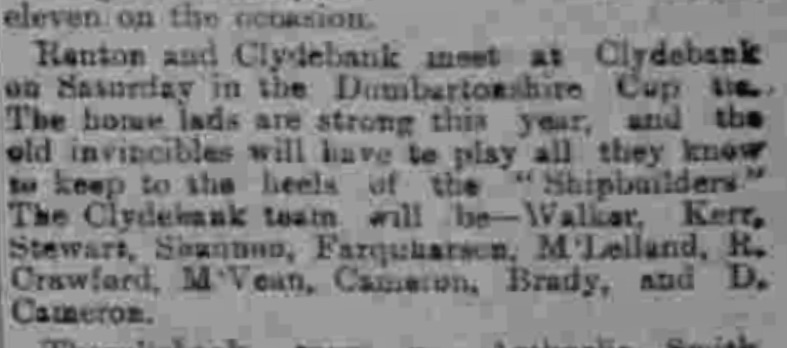
Clydebank F.C. side for the 1899 Dumbartonshire Cup first round match with Renton, Scottish Referee, 1 September 1899

The third senior club with the name Clydebank, but the second from Clydebank itself, was founded in 1899. The ambition of the club was demonstrated by it inviting Dumbarton and Rangers to be the club's first opponents in August that year; the Bankers surprisingly beat Dumbarton 3–1 in the club's first-ever match.

The club's promising start continued as it held neighbours Vale of Leven to a draw in the first round of the 1899–1900 Scottish Qualifying Cup, although it lost in the replay. Clydebank's protest that the Vale's colours were too similar to Clydebank's, which, combined with the "laziness" of the referee, led to a "grand fiasco", was dismissed, with the Scottish FA retaining the deposit; the referee explaining that the Vale had changed to light blue jerseys and white pants, which contrasted nicely with Clydebank's all dark blue.

It was also one of the four entrants to the Dumbartonshire Cup that season, played to a league format, and remarkably all four clubs finished with 6 points from 6 games, all from 2 wins, draws, and defeats each. Unfortunately for the club the biggest score in the competition was its 7–1 defeat at the Vale – the club's final fixture in the competition, when even a draw would have guaranteed it a place in the final – and the club's goal average meant it finished bottom.

Almost as soon as the club had started however it had run out of money. It lost the use of Hamilton Park to the Scottish Junior Football Association side Yoker Athletic at the end of the season, and scratched to Linthouse (also moribund) in the 1900–01 Qualifying Cup, the withdrawal being evidence of its "retiral from warfare". Someone had evidently paid the small subscription to the Scottish Football Association for the 1901–02 season however as it made one more entry to the Qualifying Cup, presumably in the hope of an attractive tie, but when matched with the Cameronians military side – a side guaranteed not to bring significant support – the club withdrew once more.

=== Colours ===
The club wore dark blue.

=== Ground ===
The club played at Hamilton Park, as the previous Clydebank had done.

=== Notable player ===
- Malcolm McVean, formerly of Liverpool and Burnley, who joined the club after its first two matches

== Clydebank United F.C. ==
Clydebank United
- Founded: 1886
- Dissolved: 1897
- Ground: Castle Grounds Park
- Secretary: J. Reavey
Home colours

=== History ===
A Junior club called Clydebank United was founded in the 1886–87 season, but there is little record of the club before 1894. In August 1895, United, aiming to become a senior club, took over the remnants of Dalmuir Thistle; Dumbarton agreed to play in the new club's first fixture. The club joined the Scottish Football Association in October 1895, too late to enter the Scottish Qualifying Cup that season, but the club did enter the Dumbartonshire Cup, losing 3–1 to Helensburgh Union in its only tie.

Ominously, for its first competitive match, United could not raise a full-strength side; the match proved to be the club's only competitive match. United did enter the Qualifying Cup in 1896–97, but scratched when drawn to face Vale of Leven in the first round, leaving the Vale to play a friendly with Arthurlie instead. The next news of United was its being struck off at the season's end for non-payment of subscription.

=== Colours ===
The club wore blue shirts and white knickers.

=== Ground ===
The club played at the Castle Grounds, notable for having a hedge and tree along its touchlines. It was previously the home of Dalmuir Thistle.

== Comrie F.C. ==
Comrie
- Nickname: the Earthquakers
- Founded: 1885
- Dissolved: 1925
- Ground: Station Park
Home colours

=== History ===
The first reference to the club, from the village of Comrie, Perth and Kinross, in is in its entry to the Perthshire Cup in 1885–86; it entered the competition as a junior club intermittently until 1895, usually losing its first match each season heavily.

Despite this, in 1895 the club joined the Scottish Football Association, and entered the Scottish Qualifying Cup for 1895–96, bolstered by a number of new arrivals from Glasgow who nearly brought off a shock, holding Dunblane to a one-goal victory in the Perthshire Cup. Comrie only lasted one season as a senior club, scratching to Fair City Athletic in the first round of the Qualifying Cup, and not renewing its Scottish FA subscription in 1896. This may also have been influenced by a protest from Dunblane after a Perthshire Cup tie that Gowanlea was a public park, rather than a private ground, and therefore against Scottish FA regulations – Dunblane's particular complaint was that the "passing the hat around" resulted in no proper accounting for its share of the gate.

Indeed, Comrie also left the Perthshire FA at this time, only re-joining in 1898. The only success the club had was reaching the semi-final of the Perthshire Cup in 1912–13, and that was only after quarter-final opponent St Johnstone scratched, having been one goal up in the original tie when it was called off due to darkness. In the semi-final Comrie lost 3–1 at Breadalbane in a replay, after throwing away a 2–0 lead at home, albeit Breadalbane had to play the first half with 10 men after centre-forward Dakers' transport to Comrie broke down.

The club continued after the First World War, but never entered the Perthshire Cup again; in 1923 the club started a second XI on the basis that local players had been squeezed out by "imported" players. However within a couple of years the club seems to have petered out, with Comrie Rovers taking over as the town's representative club.

=== Colours ===
The club played in blue and white.

=== Ground ===
The club originally played at Gowanlea to the south of the village, in Dalginross. From 1898 it played at Station Park.

=== Nickname ===
The club's nickname of the Earthquakers derives from the village's distinction of being the most earthquake-affected habitation in Britain, with Earthquake House, a building for the study of earthquakes, being put up near the village in 1874.

== Dunkeld & Birnam F.C. (1891) ==
Dunkeld & Birnam
- Founded: 1891
- Dissolved: 1896
- Ground: Recreation Grounds
- Match Secretary: Harris M. Scott
Home colours

=== History ===
The Dunkeld, Perthshire club was founded as Dunkeld & Birnam United in 1891 (dropping the United by 1893) and was admitted to the Perthshire Football Association that September. It entered the Perthshire Cup from 1891–92 to 1895–96, losing in the first round every time.

Despite this lack of success, the club turned senior and entered the Scottish Qualifying Cup in 1895–96, but scratched to Rob Roy before playing. By September 1896 the club had run out of money, unable to pay its liabilities, so it was wound up. Its last game was its Qualifying Cup debut the following season – a 4–2 defeat to Huntingtower.

=== Colours ===
The club wore white shirts and blue knickers.

=== Ground ===
The club played at the Recreation Grounds in Dunkeld.

== East Benhar Rangers F.C. ==
East Benhar Rangers
- Full name: East Benhar Rangers Football Club
- Nickname: the Benharians
- Founded: 1900
- Dissolved: 1901
- Ground: Sports Field
- Match Secretary: James Muir
Home colours

=== History ===
The club, from Fauldhouse in West Lothian, was formed in 1900 to provide senior football for the area, and signed up a number of former professional players for its first season. At the time the village was part of Lanarkshire.

The club was admitted to the Scottish Football Association in October 1900, too late to enter the Scottish Qualifying Cup that season. However its entry to the Lanarkshire Association in November 1900 was in time to play in the Lanarkshire Cup in 1900–01.

The club's first match was a 3–0 home defeat to Carfin Emmett in October 1900, but it gained its first win in its third match, 2–0 against Bathgate. It was however unlucky with its Lanarkshire Cup draw, having to face Motherwell at Fir Park, and was beaten 11–2, the home side even having goals disallowed.

The Rangers' first, and only, Qualifying Cup tie was a home derby against Dykehead, spiced up by both sides recruiting from the same pool of talent, and the visitors won 4–2; Pat Slavin had moved from Benhar to Dykehead, proved the difference. Another heavy defeat in the first round of the Lanarkshire – 9–1 at Carfin Emmett – seems to have convinced the club committee that senior football in the village was not feasible, and it disbanded in August 1902.

=== Colours ===
The club played in light blue.

=== Ground ===
The club's first match was played at Braehead Park. For its third game it had secured a private ground known simply as the Sports Field.

=== Notable players ===
The club's initial recruitment included:

- Martin Hughes, goalkeeper, from Middlesbrough
- Thomas Cherry, wing-half, from Grimsby Town
- Robert Murray, centre-half, from Nottingham Forest

== Glasgow Normal Athletic F.C. ==
Glasgow Normal Athletic
- Nickname: the Students
- Founded: 1900
- Dissolved: 1904
- Ground: Nithsdale Park
- Match secretary: J. S. Smith
Home colours

=== History ===
A "Normal Athletic", playing at Keppochill, had been active from the 1880s until 1893 and was revived in 1900. The club was for those teaching and studying at the Normal School for the Training of Teachers, set up in 1837.

The club promptly joined the Glasgow Association, entitling it to take part in the Scottish Qualifying Cup and Glasgow Cup in 1900–01; the club is not listed as having joined the Scottish Football Association separately.

The Students were naturally outgunned; it lost its only ties in the Qualifying Cup and Glasgow Cup from 1900–01 to 1902–03 and scratched from its first round tie in the Qualifying Cup in 1903–04, not bothering to try in the Glasgow.

It had more relevant competition in the Scottish Amateur Football League, of which it was a founder member in 1901. In the League's first season, the Students were ranked second in the final table of six clubs, four points behind leaders Paisley Academical, although Ayr Parkhouse was one point behind with games in hand. However, as the title required a play-off, the league section was left unfinished, and Paisley Academical went on to take the title. The club however only played one more season in the League, resigning before the 1903–04 season.

Although the club ceased operations as a regular side in 1904, being struck from Scottish FA membership in August, it did play at least one match afterwards, a 2–1 win at Kilmacolm in 1908.

=== Colours ===
The club played in black and gold.

=== Ground ===
The club's ground, Nithsdale Park, was between Pollokshields and Maxwell Park stations.

== Glenarnott Athletic F.C. ==
Glenarnott Athletic
- Founded: 1897
- Dissolved: 1899
- Ground: none
- Match Secretary: R. McNair, S. C. Maxwell
Home colours

=== History ===
The first reference to the club is from 1897, losing 5–2 to Newton Stewart Athletic in the final of the Wigtownshire Cup; the club did not have to play a fixture before the final, Stranraer scratching to the club in the semi-final. Glenarnott had taken a two-goal lead in the final, but that was with the benefit of a considerable wind, and in the second half Newton Stewart overwhelmed it.

Glenarnott was also from the village of Newton Stewart, but despite that – and the club's second secretary S. C. Maxwell living in the same street as his Newton Stewart Athletic counterpart – the Scottish Football Association considered the club a Kirkcudbrightshire concern.

The club joined the Scottish FA in May 1897, and its first act under the SFA's auspices was to scratch from its first round tie in the Scottish Qualifying Cup against Tarff Rovers, which was one of the causative factors in the Scottish FA setting up a committee to find out why so many teams ceded ties before playing. The club in fact did not play at all in the 1897–98 season, with it being bruited that the club's membership was simply to secure a vote at the Scottish FA, and what entity there was had amalgamated with Newton Stewart Athletic. Despite this, the club still entered the 1898–99 Qualifying Cup, and was drawn at home to St Cuthbert Wanderers, but it was believed the entry had been falsified, and it was struck from the Scottish FA's roll in 1899.

=== Colours ===
The club wore myrtle green.

=== Ground ===
The club only ever seems to have played two matches in its existence, namely the Wigtownshire Cup final against Newton Stewart and an 8–2 defeat to Dalbeattie Star in August 1898, and there is no record of it having a home ground.

== Hamilton Garrison F.C. ==
Hamilton Garrison
- Founded: 1888
- Dissolved: 1931
- Ground: Hamilton Barracks
- Secretary: John Morrison
Home colours

=== History ===
The club was made up of soldiers stationed at the garrison in Hamilton, Lanarkshire, and its first reported match took place in 1888 against the "Boy Jags" of Hamilton Thistle. It entered the Lanarkshire Cup in two separate runs, from 1901–02 to 1909–10, and from 1921–22 to 1927–28. The club also joined the Scottish Football Association in 1919 and entered the Scottish Qualifying Cup from 1919–20 to 1927–28. It lost every match it played in the two tournaments. It walked over in the first round of the 1922–23 Qualifying Cup after opponent Renton scratched but lost 3–0 at Galston in the second.

The club had a little more success in the Scottish Amateur Cup, reaching the third round in 1920–21 and 1921–22. The last recorded match for the club was a 6–1 home defeat to Greenhill Thistle in November 1930.

=== Colours ===
The club wore scarlet and black until 1925, and changed to a combination of blue, black, and green from then until its demise.

=== Ground ===
The club played its home matches in the Barracks, but it was unable to use it for Cup ties as it was not up to the proper Scottish FA standard, so had to play each of its senior ties away from home.

== Jamestown F.C. (1898) ==
Jamestown
- Founded: 1898
- Dissolved: 1899
- Ground: Balloch Road
- Secretary: R. Coubrough, R. Mills
Home colours

=== History ===
The club was the second senior club from the village of Jamestown, in the Vale of Leven area of West Dunbartonshire, after the previous club which had entered Scottish Cup from 1878 to 1890. It also had a Junior club affiliated with it, called Jamestown Athletic, which shared colours and secretary with the senior.

This second attempt club was founded in 1898 and had not played a match before joining the Scottish Football Association in August. It recruited a number of veteran players, including Mills, M'Coll, Smith, Gillies, and Graham, and was fancied for its first competitive match, against Renton in the first round of the 1898–99 Scottish Qualifying Cup.

Jamestown warmed up with a 0–0 draw against Cartvale, and secured another goalless draw with Renton in their tie; Renton won the replay 3–0.

Jamestown was also drawn against Renton in the Dumbartonshire Cup, but this time lost more heavily, 7–0 in a two-legged tie.

The club scratched to Kilbarchan in the Qualifying Cup second round in 1899–1900, after getting through the first round on a bye, and was suspended from the Scottish FA in September 1899 for not paying a required gate share to Johnstone. After a season without playing the club was desultorily struck from the membership roll in April 1900.

=== Colours ===
The club wore black and yellow.

=== Ground ===
Like the previous side from the village, Jamestown played at Balloch Park.

== Lennox Amateurs F.C. ==
Lennox Amateurs
- Founded: 1907
- Dissolved: 1910
- Ground: St James' Park
- Match secretary: Mr. Leslie
Home colours

=== History ===
The Dumbarton club was founded in 1907; its earliest recorded fixture for the club is a 1–1 draw at Barrhead Amateurs on October. In 1908 it joined the Scottish Football Association, entitling it to take part in senior competitions, and also entered the Scottish Amateur Football League.

The attempt to run an amateur side in an area where professional football had been reduced to a rump was always quixotic, and the club was almost entirely without any success. It played in the Dumbartonshire Cup in 1908–09 and 1909–10, which was run to a league system, but finished bottom in both seasons, with 2 wins in 14 matches; it should at least have won a third, a match at Renton being abandoned with the Amateurs 2–0 up after a Renton player threw the ball at the referee and the crowd invaded the pitch to support him, and the match was never replayed.

The club's initial Amateur League was a little more successful, the club heading for a mid-table position when the competition fizzled out because of the costs of travelling. Its second Amateur League campaign – the competition now split geographically – could scarcely have been worse, the club losing its first six matches, with no sign that it played its remaining four.

It also played three ties in the Scottish Qualifying Cup, all heavy defeats – 8–0 at home to Port Glasgow Athletic in 1908–09 and 6–0 to Dumbarton Harp in the next two seasons. The club played in the first Scottish Amateur Cup in 1910–11, and beat Queen's Park's Hampden XI in the first round, which made Lennox favourites for the competition; however the club was decisively beaten in the semi-final by the John Neilson FPs.

The semi-final defeat seems to have taken the heart out of the club, as in August 1910 it resigned from the Scottish FA, and the club never played again.

=== Colours ===
The club played in black and white, probably in honour of Queen's Park. Whether advertent or not, the colours were also those of the previous Lennox club from the town.

=== Ground ===
The club originally played at Boghead Park, Dumbarton's home ground. In 1908 it moved to St James' Park, which had been used by clubs such as Dumbarton Athletic the previous century.

=== Notable players ===
- William Clark, who signed for Dumbarton for the 1910–11 season

== Lumphinnans F.C. ==
Lumphinnans
- Founded: 1914
- Dissolved: 1915
- Ground: Zetland Park
- President: Joseph Parker
- Secretary: Thomas Fitzpatrick
Home colours

=== History ===
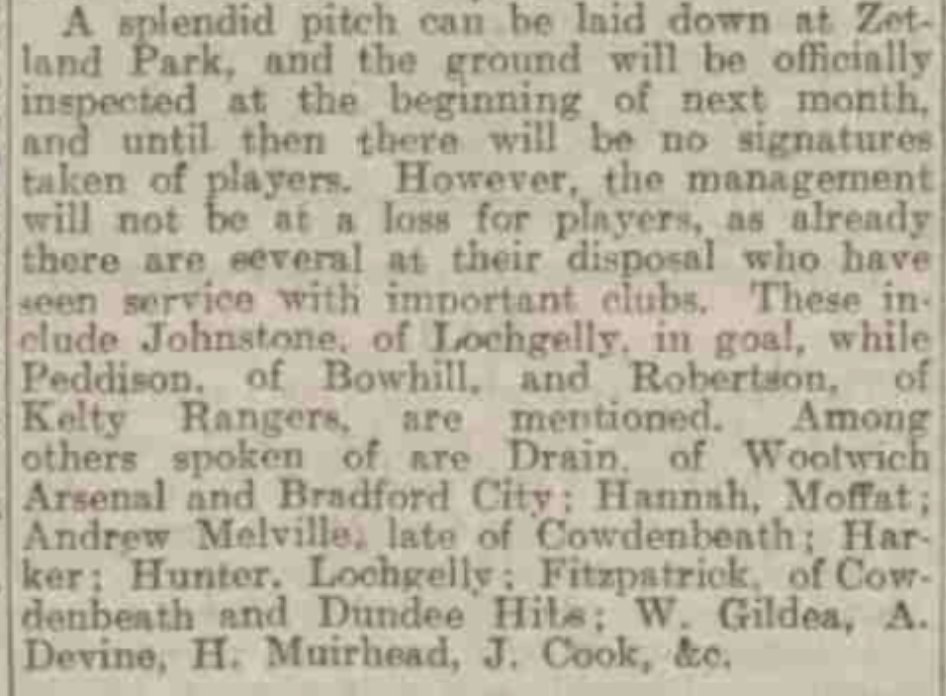
Lumphinnans F.C. plans for 1914–15, Dundee Courier, 30 July 1914

The club, from the village of the same name in Fifeshire, was formed in May 1914 to provide senior football in the village. The club's administrative officers were from Cowdenbeath, and the club resolved to play its home matches when Cowdenbeath was not also at home.

The club kept its ambitions in check for the 1914–15 season, deciding not to join a league (a late application to join the Central Football League after Lochgelly United was elevated to the Scottish Football League falling short), but to ease into football by playing in Cup competitions alone. However the club's timing could scarcely have been worse, with the First World War starting within a fortnight. There are only two recorded matches for the club; a 5–0 home defeat to Cowdenbeath to open its ground, and a 3–0 defeat to Lochgelly United in the 1914–15 Scottish Qualifying Cup, only goalkeeper Robertson saving the club from further humiliation after a "feeble" show.

Thereafter, the club failed to fulfil its fixtures, as so many of its players had joined the armed forces. Indeed, one player, A. Wilkie, was censured for turning out for Inverness Caledonian when registered to Lumphinnans, but having been sent to Inverness for military purposes. Lumphinnans therefore scratched from the Fife Cup, its sister competition the Wemyss Cup, and the Penman Cup. The club therefore went into a hiatus for the War, which became permanent.

=== Colours ===
The club played in maroon.

=== Ground ===
The club's ground, which was behind Main Street, was called Zetland Park in honour of the Earl of Zetland, the proprietor of the estate.

== Newbie Engineers F.C. ==
Newbie Engineers
- Founded: 1899
- Dissolved: 1901
- Ground: Highcroft Park
Home colours

=== History ===
The club was the works side of the Cochran & Co shipbuilding company in Annan, Dumfries and Galloway, and is first recorded as a football side in 1899, losing 12–0 to Shaddongate United. The club finished the season as runner-up to Annan United in a local competition, and in August 1900 took the hugely ambitious step of joining the Scottish Football Association.

The club did beat Barholm Rovers in the first round of the 1900–01 Scottish Qualifying Cup, but it lost in the second round to the 6th G.R.V., and lost its only matches in the Southern Counties Cup and Annandale Cup. The last record of the club is a 2–0 defeat at Annan in May 1901.

=== Colours ===
The club played in navy blue.

=== Ground ===
The club's ground was Highcroft Park.

== Paisley Grammar School Former Pupils F.C. ==
Paisley Grammar School F.P.
- Founded: 1906
- Dissolved: 1952
- Ground: Greenlaw
1906–25 colours

=== History ===
The club was founded for ex-pupils of Paisley Grammar School by William Walker in August 1906, with the aim of playing in the Glasgow & District Former Pupils' League. Despite the existence of Paisley Academical, which was also open to former pupils of the school, the F.P. also joined the Scottish Football Association and Renfrewshire Association in 1912, and the two sides often played in the same Scottish Qualifying Cup.

The club entered the Scottish Qualifying Cup and Renfrewshire Cup from 1912–13 to 1933–34, but only ever won one match; a semi-final game in the Renfrewshire Victoria Cup (a consolation cup for those eliminated from the main competition) in 1929–30 over John Neilson F.P.s, but lost 2–1 in the final to Greenock High School F.P.s at Cappielow Park, the match being stopped with 10 minutes remaining because of bad light. The only Qualifying Cup tie which did not end in defeat was a surprising 3–3 draw at Royal Albert in 1929–30, the Royalists winning the replay 5–2.

The club continued playing until at least 1952, against other former pupil clubs, but the club ceased operating on a nationally competitive level when it withdrew from the Scottish Amateur Football Association in May 1935.

=== Colours ===
The club originally wore blue and gold. In 1925 it changed to navy, sky, and yellow.

=== Ground ===
The club played at Greenlaw, the ground of Paisley Academical.

== Peterhead Hibernians F.C. ==
Peterhead Hibernians
- Founded: 1906
- Dissolved: 1912
- Ground: Recreation Park
- Secretary: Aiton Buchan
- Manager: George Steele
Home colours

=== History ===
The club was formed in 1906 as a rift from the more established Peterhead club; with too many players for one XI, many of the "idle" list formed their own club, under the coaching of George Steele. Originally the club had some senior players, such as George Ross and Aiton Buchan (formerly of St Bernards) and Cadger (formerly of East Stirlingshire), and had a successful first season.

However it could never live up to that early promise. Its first match in the Aberdeenshire Cup was a 3–2 defeat to Peterhead in November 1908.

The Hibernians were admitted as members of the Aberdeenshire FA in May 1909 and the Scottish Football Association three months later. This entitled the club to enter the Scottish Qualifying Cup; the Hibernians drew 2–2 at fellow Irish diaspora club Aberdeen Harp in the first round, squandering a 2-goal lead by conceding a last-second equalizer. Hibs lost 6–2 in the replay at Haudagain Park in Woodside, hindered by losing a player through injury when 3–2 down. This put the club into the Consolation Cup, where it was drawn to play Aberdeen University. The sides failed to agree a time and place for the match; the Scottish FA's response to a request for an extension to the deadline was to disqualify both clubs.

The club was one of the first entrants to the Scottish Amateur Cup in 1910, and beat Leith Amateurs 2–1 in the first round; the run ended against Queen's Park Strollers in the quarter-final.

Its run in senior football was suffused with heavy defeats. Its first competitive win was a 3–0 triumph over the obscure Maud United in the 1910–11 Aberdeenshire Cup. Its second and last was 3–2 over Ellon United in the first round of the same competition the following season.

The club was however on borrowed time. A Scottish FA delegation checked on the status of Balmoor Park (the club's stated ground for 1911–12) and reported that they had found "no goal posts, pitch marks, or any appurtenances of the game...the ground no evidence that football had been played there for a long time." The Hibs blamed building work encroaching on the ground area and the situation was temporary. The matter was adjourned until the end of the season, but the club was struck from the Scottish FA roll in April 1912.

Its last Qualifying Cup tie had been its most ignominious – a 12–1 defeat to Fraserburgh. Such was the apathy by now that Hibs did not protest that Fraserburgh fielded two players who were under suspension; the point was only noticed when the Broch beat Peterhead in the second round, and the Blue Toon successfully protested.

=== Colours ===
In common with many Irish diaspora sides, the club wore green.

=== Ground ===
The club played variously at Balmoor Park and at the Recreation Park on the Peterhead Links.

== Portpatrick Artillery F.C. ==
Portpatrick Artillery F.C.
- Founded: 1899
- Dissolved: 1901
- Ground: Fey Park

=== History ===
The club, formed from the volunteer corps in Portpatrick, Wigtownshire, had a brief existence that left almost no traces; its only reported matches of any note came in the Wigtownshire Cup in 1899–1900 and 1900–01 and the Scottish Qualifying Cup in the latter season, although the club was recorded to have won the Artillery Cup in 1899–1900.

The club joined the Scottish Football Association in 1900, despite some doubts whether the club had a private ground.

In the Qualifying Cup, the club walked over Tarff Rovers and in the second round lost 11–1 to Newton Stewart to so little interest nobody informed the media in time for Monday's press. Apart from a friendly in November 1900 - when the club re-gained some honour by holding Newton Stewart to a 2–2 draw - that seems to have been the end for the club, interest in Portpatrick lying dormant until the formation of a new club in August 1903.

=== Ground ===
The club played at Fey Park, Dunskey.

== Royal Garrison Artillery F.C. ==
Royal Garrison Artillery
- Nicknames: the Gunners, the R.G.A.
- Founded: 1903
- Dissolved: 1908 (as a senior club)
- Ground: Leith Fort
Home colours

=== History ===
The Royal Garrison Artillery, as with most of the British Army stations, formed its own association football sides; sides from the Shoeburyness, Sheerness, and Leith battalions all entered the 1904–05 Army Cup. The Leith garrison took matters a stage further by joining the East of Scotland Football Association in 1905 and, in 1906, the Scottish Football Association, which brought with it entry to the Scottish Qualifying Cup, as well as other senior competitions held locally.

The Garrison duly entered the East of Scotland Shield Qualifying Cup from 1905–06 to 1907–08; at the time, reaching the final entitled a team to play in the City Cup, against two of the Edinburgh teams in the Scottish League who played off in the East of Scotland Shield. The Garrison never won a tie in the competition, and on exiting the main competition, the club was put into the Consolation Cup. In the 1906–07 edition of the latter, a Garrison win over Berwick Rangers (thanks to a Willie Hope own-goal) put the club in the semi-final, where it lost to Broxburn Athletic.

The club also entered the Qualifying Cup in 1906–07 and 1907–08, winning one tie – its first against Selkirk. The tie had not been an attractive one for locals; the gate money only just exceeded the referee's expenses of 26 shillings and sixpence, half of which the Garrison had to pay (albeit under protest), and the Garrison even had to wait for the 15 second-class train fares Selkirk was obliged to pay, the Scottish FA threatening the lowland side with suspension for non-payment.

Ironically outgunned at senior level, the club allowed its Scottish FA membership to lapse in August 1908, and it returned to army football, playing until at least 1913.

=== Colours ===
The club played in blue.

=== Ground ===
The club played at Leith Fort.

== Rumford Rovers F.C. ==
Rumford Rovers F.C.
- Full name: Rumford Rovers Football Club
- Founded: 1887
- Dissolved: 1899
- President: Peter Baird
- Secretary: James Allison, John Pender
Home colours

=== History ===
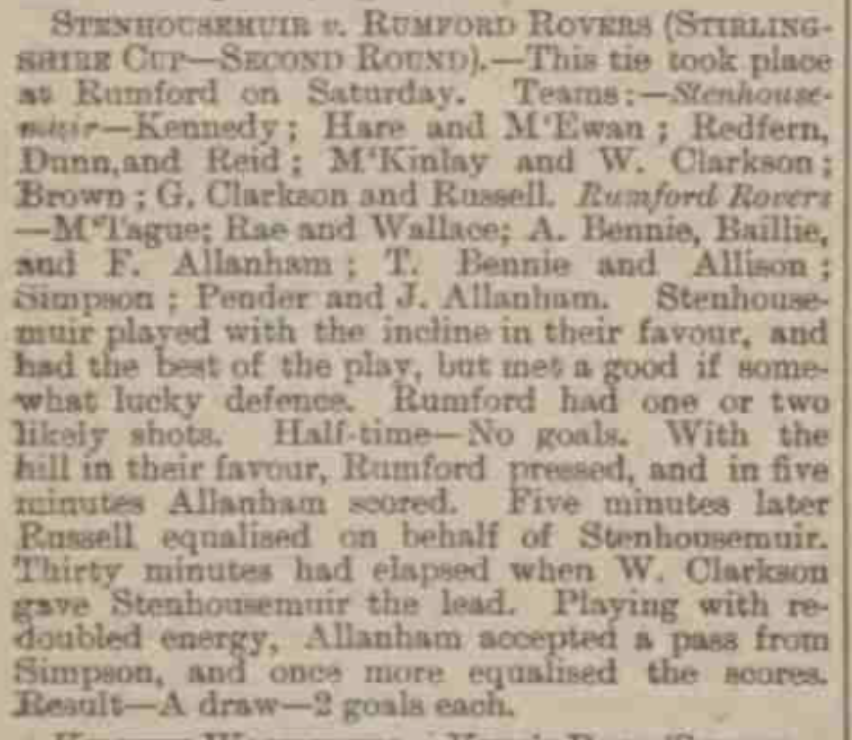
1896–97 Stirlingshire Cup 2nd round 1st leg, Rumford Rovers 2–2 Stenhousemuir, Falkirk Herald, 2 December 1896

The club, from Polmont in Stirlingshire, was formed in 1887, and its early years were marked by heavy defeats in the Stirlingshire Cup; its first match in the competition was a 15–2 defeat by Slamannan and its best performance was a 7–6 defeat to Vale of Endrick in 1891–92.

The Rovers were almost inactive in 1893 and 1894, playing only friendly or 5-a-side matches, and it was announced as defunct by the end of 1894. However, the club was revived in the summer of 1895, re-admitted to the Stirlingshire Association, and admitted for the first time to the Scottish Football Association.

The club duly entered the Scottish Qualifying Cup for 1895–96, but lost 2–1 at Denny Athletic in the first round. It was the club's only tie in the competition, as it did not renew its membership at the end of the season.

Its Stirlingshire Cup appearances repeated the lack of success of its first runs in the competition; it never won a tie, even its two draws in the competition – against Stenhousemuir in 1896–97 and Dunipace in 1897–98, both seasons in which the competition was played over two legs – were followed by heavy defeats in the away legs, Stenhousemuir winning 15–4 on aggregate, despite Rovers taking the lead in the second leg.

Rumford's last appearance was a 2–0 defeat to Falkirk Amateurs in the first leg of the 1897–98 Consolation Cup semi-final (which Rovers had made by default) – the club did not turn up for the second, the local FA ordering Rovers to reimburse the Amateurs for £1 2/6 in expenses.

There was a curious aftermath, as in August 1898 the club re-joined the Scottish Football Association. However it scratched from its Scottish Qualifying Cup tie against Stenhousemuir and within the month the Stirlingshire Association suspended the club sine die on the basis that it was, by now, a bogus club, and no representative could be found. It was strongly suspected that it had long ceased to exist, and had been entered into cup competitions for 1898–99 in order to make a profit by scratching from its ties for a financial consideration; the media sceptically referred to the club as "Rummy Rovers" as a consequence.

The club therefore had a shadow existence, as a member purporting to represent the club had attended a Scottish FA meeting, but the named secretary of the club – John Pender – denied any knowledge of the club at all when Stenhousemuir queried the non-payment of its expenses for the aborted Cup tie. There was no answer when the Stirlingshire FA later wrote to Pender and a Mr Baillie (who had attended a Stirlingshire FA meeting in 1898 as a Rovers representative) to explain what was happening. The club was formally struck off the Scottish FA roll in April 1899 for non-payment of subscription, by which time "nobody knows anything about this club, neither where it hails from, who represents it now, [or] who paid its subscription [at the start of the season]", and suspended once more from the Stirlingshire.

The name was occasionally resurrected, the first time in September 1899 for a one-off five-a-side team.

=== Colours ===
The club played in red and white vertically striped shirts, and "dark" knickers (almost certainly serge blue). On its 1898 revival, the club registered white shirts as its colours.

=== Ground ===
The club played at Wallacelea Park.

== Star of Atholl F.C. ==
Star of Atholl
- Nickname: the Stars
- Founded: 1905
- Dissolved: 1907
- Ground: Tullibardine Park
- Hon. President: Marquess of Tullibardine
- President: John Young
- Secretary: F. Ross
Home colours

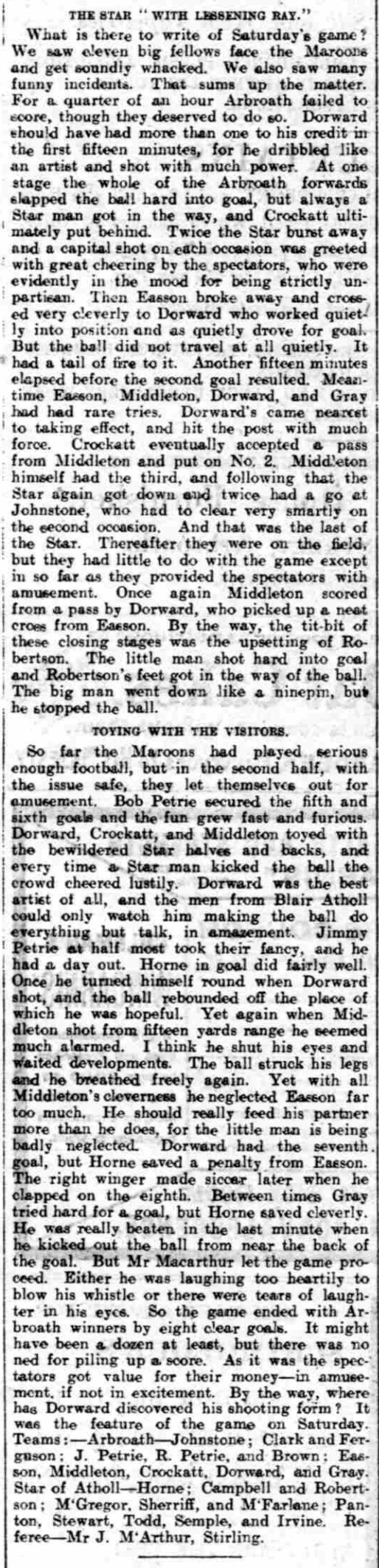
1905–06 Scottish Qualifying Cup 2nd round, Arbroath 8–0 Star of Atholl, Arbroath Herald, 21 September 1905

=== History ===
The club was founded on 11 October 1905 in order to provide football for the young men of Blair Atholl, under the patronage of the Duke of Atholl, and the club's honorary president, the Marquess of Tullibardine, opened its first meeting with some tips as to how to run a successful club. The Marquess kicked off the club's first match, at home to Dunkeld & Birnam the following Saturday, and the Stars came from 2–0 down to win 3–2.

The club took its name from a nickname of Baledmund House, a Georgian-era baronial home prominent as a landmark.

The club was promptly admitted to the new Perthshire League as a founder member in November; with 10 clubs entered for the competition, the Perthshire FA split the competition into two, and Star of Atholl was placed with Dunkeld, Breadalbane, and Vale of Atholl into the Atholl League, and the Marquess agreed to become League president.

The Stars also played in the Atholl Cup from 1904–05 to 1906–07. Its run in both competitions was unsuccessful – in three years of league football, the Stars only won once (3–2 over Vale of Atholl in 1906, all the goals coming in the first half, and the Stars being reduced to 10 for the second through injury), and won two ties in the Atholl Cup. Its best performance was drawing twice with Our Boys of Blairgowrie in the 1905–06 semi-final.

In 1905, the club joined the Perthshire Association, entitling it to play in the Perthshire Cup and Scottish Qualifying Cup, and it entered both competitions in 1905–06 and 1906–07. The only tie in either competition it won was in the first round of the 1905–06 Qualifying Cup, beating Dunkeld & Birnam 2–0. In the second round the Stars lost 8–0 in front of 1,500 spectators at Arbroath, having sold home advantage for £12; the highlight was Horne saving a penalty when the Stars were six down.

The club managed to complete the 1906–07 season, finishing off with a 2–1 defeat by a side from the Scots Greys on 3 June, but it did not renew its Perthshire FA membership and was "scored off the roll".

The name has been revived on occasion, the first time in 1949, for a club which played in a similar gold and black kit.

=== Colours ===
The club wore the colours of the house of Athole, namely yellow and black, "without the star".

=== Ground ===
The club played at a ground owned by a Mr MacDonald, and named Tullibardine Park in honour of its patron.

== Strathallan F.C. ==
Strathallan
- Nickname: the Strath
- Founded: 1902 (as a separate club)
- Dissolved: 1905
- Secretary: James MacRosty
| 1902–04 colours | 1904–05 colours |

=== History ===
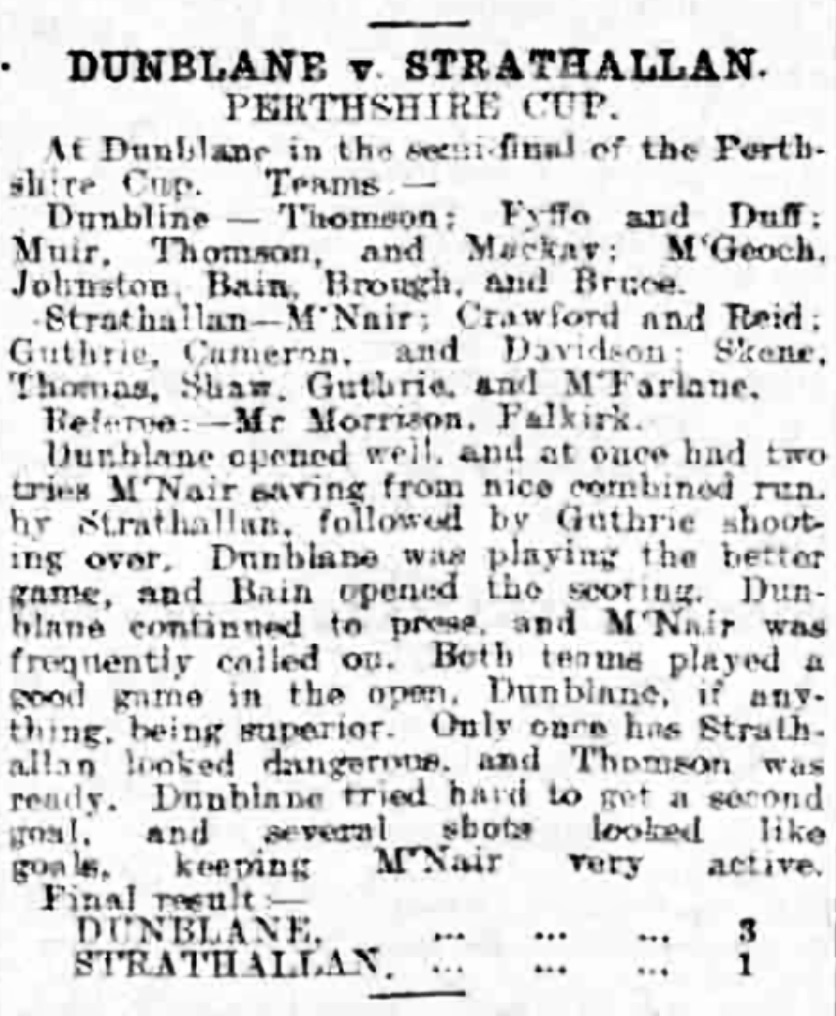
1903–04 Perthshire Cup semi-final, Dunblane 3–1 Strathallan, Dundee Fvening Post, 16 January 1904

The club was originally the reserve side of the Dunblane F.C., and, as was common in the Victorian era, had a different name to the parent club, under the full name of Strathallan XI. The first record of the name being used is from 1898.

In 1901, after friction broke out between the parent club and the reserve side, the Strathallan XI transferred allegiance to Auchterarder Thistle. The XI returned to Dunblane for a friendly match in May 1902, which Dunblane won 5–0. Despite this defeat, the XI – which was still playing in Dunblane – resolved two months later to split from Auchterarder to form its own separate senior side, with entries planned for the Perthshire Cup and Scottish Qualifying Cup. The club duly entered the Perthshire FA in September under the simpler name Strathallan, but lost its first Cup tie at Auchterarder Thistle.

Strathallan entered the Scottish Football Association in August 1903; in contrast to Dunblane, Strathallan remained a purely amateur side, made up purely of Dunblane men. Its first Qualifying Cup tie in 1903–04 was an 8–1 hammering of Morrisonians, but it lost 2–0 at home to the Vale of Teith in the second.

It had a longer run in the Perthshire Cup, reaching the semi-final, where the club was drawn to face Dunblane at Duckburn Park; despite strengthening the side with players from the amateur ranks of Scottish football, the Strath went down 3–1. The club also played league football in the season, although the competition – the Central League – only had three teams in it (Dunblane and King's Park being the others) after Vale of Teith withdrew, and Strathallan only picked up one point from the three matches it played, Dunblane winning the title without needing to play Strathallan a second time.

Despite the promising second season, the club's third was its last. It scratched from the Qualifying Cup to Auchterarder and lost in the first round of the Perthshire Cup to the Morrisonians at Turret Bridge Park, in part because a lot of its players were away from Dunblane, and during the season a number of its players were found in the Dunblane ranks. It did not renew its Scottish FA membership for 1905–06, and dissolved.

=== Colours ===
The club described its colours as blue and white when starting out as a senior club, and black and white for its last season; the arrangement was probably in hoops, as when the club was a second XI it wore similar jerseys to Queen's Park.

=== Ground ===
The club's ground was opposite to Dunblane's Duckburn Park.

=== Notable players ===
- William Eadie, who kept goal for the club in its final season

== Trinity F.C. (Edinburgh) ==
Trinity F.C.
- Full name: Trinity Football Club
- Founded: 1893
- Dissolved: 1898
- Ground: Logie Green
- Secretary: R. Cowper
Home colours

=== History ===
The Edinburgh club turned senior in 1896, after a run as a Junior side; the earliest recorded match for the club was against the Adventurers' second XI in October 1893. The club was effectively a replacement of Edinburgh Casuals, another amateur club which had tried senior football, and which had last played in October 1895.

It was a purely amateur outfit, declaring that "the wealth of a Barney Barnato would not be sufficient" to turn it professional. Early recruits to the senior side included goalkeeper Ruxton from St Bernards and the Hay brothers, both members of the Edinburgh Harriers athletics club.

The club entered two local competitions, the East of Scotland Shield and the King Cup, in its first senior season. It won its first round tie in the Shield against Muirhouse Rovers – the clubs forced to play each other, as both had entered after other first round ties had been played – by 5 goals to 1, at Davidson's Mains. In the second round, against St Bernards at Logie Green, the club caused a sensation by taking the lead. However, in the second half, two of the Trinity players refused to play on, owing to the adverse weather conditions, and the Saints came back to win 3–1.

Trinity also won its first round King Cup tie, 2–1 at Vale of Leithen, and then drew a bye in the second round, which put it in the quarter-final; in the last 8, Trinity was drawn to visit Penicuik Athletic. However, the club's amateurism was shown up by it only turning up at Penicuik with seven players. Facing a certain defeat, Trinity scratched from the competition, and played out a friendly, eventually recruiting two substitutes. The friendly ended 4–3 to Penicuik, although the home side "played to the gallery" when 4–1 up.

It joined the Scottish Football Association in November 1896, by which time it had 70 members; it was too late to play in the Scottish Qualifying Cup in 1896–97, so the club's first entry to the competition was 1897–98. It walked over a scratching Loanhead Benburb in the first round. Before the second round tie was to be played, the club lost 4–0 at home to Penicuik Athletic in the first round of the Shield, despite being boosted by the recruitment of forward Coltherd from St Bernards. The club scratched from its second round Qualifying Cup tie with Bathgate on the day of the match itself, due to the players "losing the train"; such metaphorical (as well as literal) amateurism seems to have finished the club off as there is no record of it playing again. The club notionally existed until the end of the season, despite not playing, as one player (forward C. Nicklin) was claiming membership of "Trinity FC" when competing in athletics.

=== Colours ===
The club wore red and white striped shirts and blue knickers.

=== Ground ===
The club played at a number of home grounds; given its amateur status it did not have a geographical constituency and appears to have hired grounds on an ad hoc basis. In 1893 for instance it played at Ferry Road, in 1894 at Hawkhill, and in 1895 at both Ferry Road and Hawkhill. It also played a match against the Scots Guards in 1896 at Easter Road. Its last recorded home match was at Logie Green, the same ground as St Bernards.

== Vale of Carrick F.C. ==
Vale of Carrick
- Founded: 1905
- Dissolved: 1906
- Ground: Carrick Park
- President: Dr Inglis
- Match secretary: Charles J. Whyte
Home colours

=== History ===
The club, from Maybole in Ayrshire, was founded in 1905, and admitted to the Scottish Football Association that August; the original name proposed was St Crispin but Vale of Carrick was chosen instead. The selecting committee did not restrict themselves to choosing local players, who were playing for the long-established Maybole F.C., but included a number of Glaswegians.

The club's first match was a 3–0 home victory over the Third Lanark "A" side, but the club's ambitions received a reality check, when fellow new bugs Ayr Academicals beat the Vale 4–0 in the first round of the Scottish Qualifying Cup – injury added to insult when John Dunlop, sent off for kicking the Acas' Ferguson, received a 2-month suspension.

The Vale had better fortune in the North Ayrshire League, beating Girvan 6–1 in its first match, and holding Maybole to a draw. However the Vale lost the return match at Ladywell Park 7–1 and also lost 8–0 at Kilwinning Eglinton.

It had become apparent that the experiment of transplanting Glaswegians to Maybole had failed, and the club scratched from the Ayrshire Cup first round tie against Annbank in March 1906, not having played since losing 3–1 at home to Beith just before Christmas 1905. Somehow the club was entered into the 1906–07 Qualifying Cup, and was drawn to play Hurlford, but the Hurlford secretary Goldie had no answer to his correspondence with regard to the tie's arrangements.

=== Colours ===
The club played in black and white.

=== Ground ===
The Vale played at Carrick Park.

== West End F.C. (Dundee) (1894) ==
West-End (Dundee)
- Founded: 1894
- Dissolved: 1925
- Ground: Esplanade Park
- President: William Peacock
- Match secretary: W. M. Jarvis, J.A. Turnbull
Home colours

=== History ===
The first West End club had been wound up in the mid-1880s, and on 17 November 1890 a second club with the name was founded, with J. A. Turnbull as captain. The club however never got off the ground, and was revived at a meeting in the Albion Hotel on 19 January 1894 as a purely amateur club in Dundee, attracting a large number of promised members. It applied to join the Scottish Football Association the next month, by which time it had "forty to fifty members" (considered cast-offs from the merged Johnstone Wanderers and Strathmore seeking re-instatement as amateurs), but was having problems in securing a private ground due to local objections. The application was duly adjourned to August, when the club was admitted, despite having "to give up their recently acquired ground", but having first option on the old Strathmore ground, which a tennis club was occupying.

The club's senior status however was short-lived. It scratched from the first round of the Scottish Qualifying Cup when drawn to face Forfar Athletic, amid dark rumours that the club did not exist, other than to make up the 10 members required for the Forfarshire FA to have a representative on the Scottish FA board. The club proved that technically incorrect by managing to play some games, but its true status in the game was shown up in an 8–0 friendly defeat to the obscure Caenlochan from Broughty Ferry the next month. Very obviously overmatched, the club did not enter any of the local senior competitions, and turned to Junior football from 1895. Even at that level the club struggled, never getting past the third round of the Scottish Junior Cup, and usually finishing near the bottom of the Dundee & District Junior League before finally giving up after the 1923–24 season.

=== Colours ===
The club wore light blue jerseys and white knickers.

=== Ground ===
The club played at Esplanade Park.

== West End F.C. (Oban) ==
West End (Oban)
- Nickname: the W.E.
- Founded: 1889?
- Dissolved: 1904
- Ground: Mossfield
- Match secretary: James Skinner, D. Young, G. M. Skinner
Home colours

=== History ===
The club, from Oban in Argyllshire, was officially called West End, but usually referred to as West End (Oban) or Oban West End to avoid confusion with other clubs of the same name.

The club was active from the 1889–90 season and won the Oban and District Junior Cup three consecutive seasons, from 1890–91 to 1892–93, beating Mossfield Thistle and Fort William (twice). It joined the Scottish Football Association in 1895, after the other clubs in the county had dissolved. It entered the Scottish Qualifying Cup three times, but lost the two ties it played – 5–4 to Duncrub Park (when included in the Perthshire section) in 1895–96 and 9–0 at Vale of Leven in 1897–98 – either side of scratching to Newtown Thistle, by which time Argyllshire had been shifted to Dunbartonshire.

The geographically isolated club had sold its home advantage for its last tie, only just managing to scrape a team together (with rumours suggesting that the club would scratch), and resigned from the Scottish FA in June 1898. The club went into abeyance for a period, before continuing at a junior level until 1904, its final game being a 3–1 defeat to sailors from the HMS Isis at Mossfield in July.

=== Colours ===
The club wore "pure white" jerseys and blue knickers, which it adopted at the start of 1890.

=== Ground ===
The club played at Mossfield.

=== Notable players ===
At least one of the club's players played for a club in both the Scottish Football League and the Southern League; Duncan Cameron, who played for Clyde and Brighton & Hove Albion.

== Whifflet Rovers F.C. ==
Gartcosh/Whifflet Rovers
- Nickname: the Rovers
- Founded: 1923
- Dissolved: 1934
- Ground: As Gartcosh: Woodneuk Park; As Whifflet: Meadow Park, Coatbridge
- Hon. Presidents: Rev. D. S. McKenzie and Rev. R. H. Lyall
- Secretary: James Blincow

=== History ===
The club was originally a junior club from the village of Gartcosh called Gartcosh Rovers, active from the 1923–24 season. The club played in the Scottish Amateur Football League from the late 1920s, and won the Second Division B section in 1929–30, gaining promotion to the First Division. The club finished as runner-up in 1931–32.

Before the 1933–34 season, the club looked to turn senior, but, knowing the Scottish Football Association would rule the club's ground as being inadequate, rented Meadow Park in Coatbridge. The SFA accepted the club as a member so long as, given the distance between Gartcosh and Coatbridge, it changed its name; it duly did so to Whifflet Rovers. It left the Scottish Amateur League to join the Coatbridge & District equivalent. The club beat Moorpark in the first round of the 1933–34 Scottish Qualifying Cup, but lost its next fixture in the competition at Vale Ocoba, and the club's move proved to be a mistake, as it did not survive the season. Indeed, it may not have seen out the year; the last recorded match for the club is a 4–2 loss to East Kilbride in the second round of the West of Scotland Amateur Cup in November.

== Wick F.C. ==
Wick
- Nickname: the Wickers
- Founded: 1904
- Dissolved: 1906
- Ground: Harrow Park
- Secretary: Mr M'Dowall
- Manager: selection by committee
Home colours

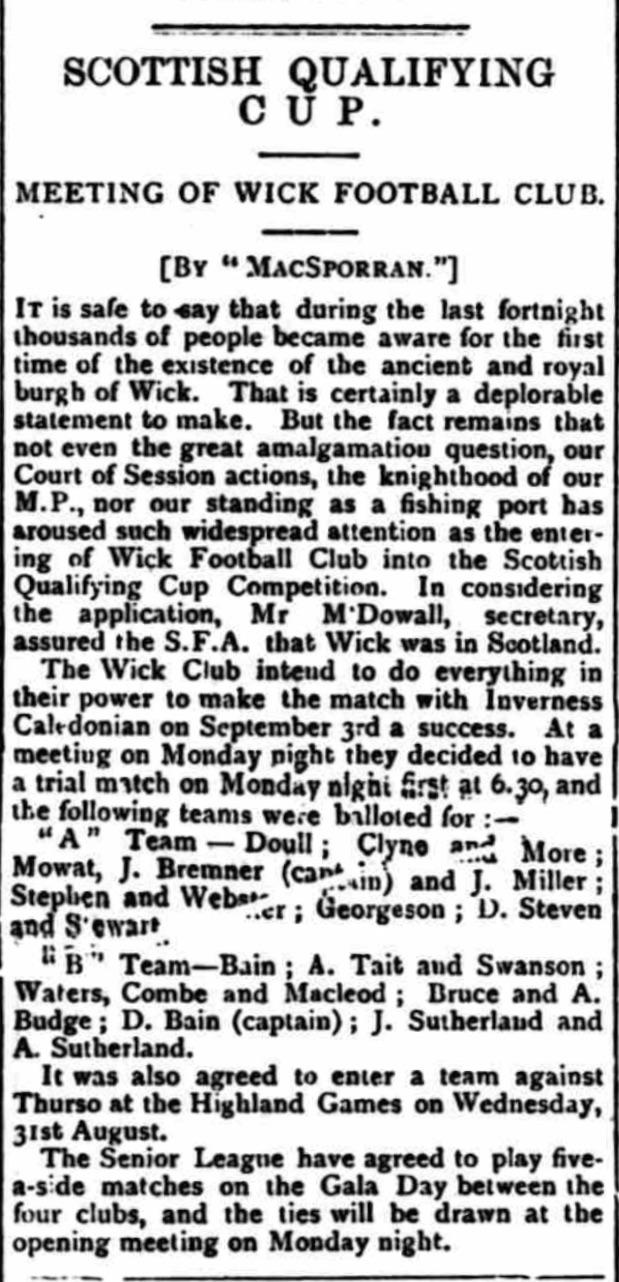
Wick F.C. preparations for the 1904–05 Scottish Qualifying Cup, John O'Groat Journal, 19 August 1904

=== History ===
The club was the second from the town of Wick in Caithness to join the Scottish Football Association, doing so soon after its creation in 1904.

It was in essence an ad-hoc club made up of players from the four town clubs, so they could take part in national competition. As with predecessor club Wick Rovers, its geographical isolation – and having to play football while the fishing season was still in full swing – proved too much of a handicap to overcome. It entered the Scottish Qualifying Cup in 1904–05 and 1905–06, but lost in the first round both times; 5–1 at home to Inverness Caledonian in the former year (with a starting XI which had not even trained together before the match), and 3–2 at home to the Black Watch in the latter.

More to the point, the Cup matches were not a financial success – the game against Caledonian only drew a gate of £7 but the cost of the guarantee and train fares for the opponents pushed the cost of hosting to £15. The Black Watch match was also a financial failure, with a gate of £4 15s. against expenditure of just under £15, although the blame was put on the weather; the rain fell so hard that the players had to leave the field for a while.

In the face of such financial disasters, the Wick association stopped entering the Qualifying Cup, although it still chose representative sides for occasional matches.

=== Colours ===
The club listed its colour as red.

=== Ground ===
The club played at Harrow Park, as Wick Rovers had done.
