= Ayr Academicals F.C. (1904) =

Former association football club in Scotland

Ayr Academicals
- Nickname(s): the Accies
- Founded: 1904
- Dissolved: 1907
- Ground: Newton Lodge Park
- Match Secretary: A. J. Gray
Home colours

== History ==
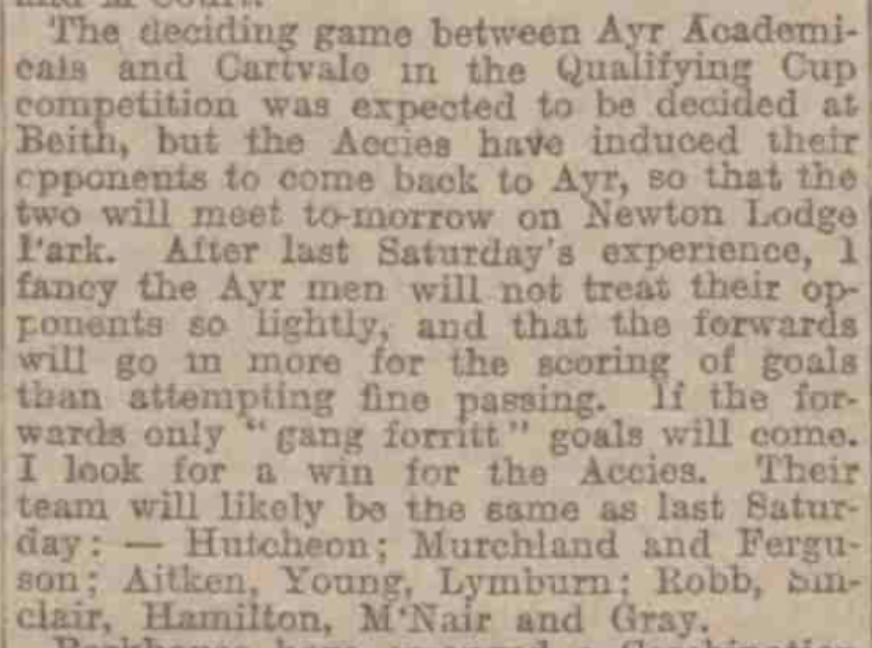
Ayr Academicals' side for the 1905–06 Scottish Qualifying Cup tie with Cartvale, Scottish Referee, 29 September 1905

The club was formed in 1904 as an amateur side made up solely of players from Ayr. Despite its amateur status - and the presence of another amateur club in the town (Ayr Parkhouse) - the Academicals promptly joined the Scottish Football Association, and entered the Scottish Qualifying Cup, Ayrshire Cup, and Ayrshire and Renfrewshire Football League for 1904–05.

The league competition wound up before completing its fixtures, and was not renewed for 1905–06, leaving the Academicals without a league competition. The only competitive win the Academicals had in its first season was a 5–1 win over Maybole in the Ayrshire League.

Indeed, the club never won a match in the Ayrshire Cup, but it did win through to the third round of the Qualifying Cup in 1905–06, thanks to a 4–0 win over Vale of Carrick (Vale's Dunlop being suspended for kicking an Accie) and a 6–0 win over Cartvale in a second replay in the second round; the Accies persuaded Cartvale to play the second replay in Ayr rather than on neutral territory. The club lost 3–1 at home to eventual Qualifying Cup finalists Beith in the third, a tie in which the winners qualified for the Scottish Cup itself; Andrew Gray gave the Accies the lead, but the professionals' superior stamina won out.

Also in 1905–06 the club was in the play-off match to determine the winner of the North Ayrshire Cup, albeit there were only 5 teams remaining in the competition. The club held Hurlford to a draw in the final, but Hurlford seem to have won the replay, as in June Hurlford was proclaimed champion.

With both Ayr F.C. and Ayr Parkhouse both around the fringes of the Scottish Football League, the Academicals were unable to generate much interest, and although it was drawn to face Lanemark in the 1907–08 Qualifying Cup, the club was "looked on as being defunct" and withdrew. After a season of inactivity the club was thrown off the Scottish FA membership roll in August 1908.

== Colours ==
The club played in white.

== Ground ==
The club played at the cricket ground on Newton Lodge.
