= Athenian F.C. =

Former association football club in Scotland

Athenian
- Full name: The Athenian Football Club
- Founded: 1887
- Dissolved: 1888
- Ground: Crawford Road
- President: Dr C. W. Cathcart
- Match Secretary: J. Maxwell Heron
- Hon. Secretary: H. Rae
Home colours

The Athenian Football Club, usually referred to in the media as Athenians, was a short-lived association football club from Edinburgh.

== History ==
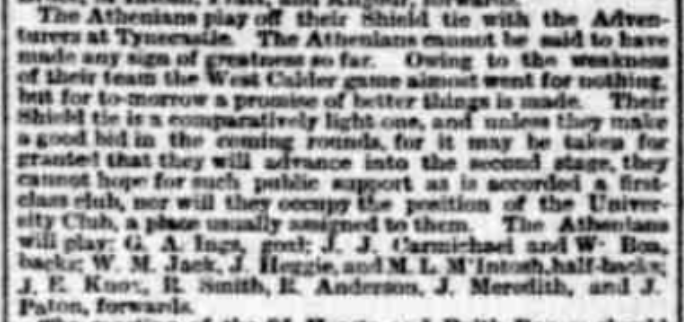
Athenians F.C. line-up for the Edinburgh Shield tie with Adventurers, 1887–88

The club was founded on 22 March 1887, taking its name from Edinburgh's nickname of the Athens of the North; the club was made up of rugby union players (mostly from Watsonians) trying their hand at the association game, and was considered to be a club founded on "a higher social basis than hitherto", with Ings, the Edinburgh University goalkeeper, as captain. The club's first match was a 5–0 defeat to the university at Corstorphine on 26 March, and its first match against an unrelated club came the following week, a 4–0 defeat to Heart of Midlothian in an hour-long game.

Before the club's first (and only) full season, it hosted an athletics contest on 21 July at the Powderhall. The club had invited Queen's Park and Battlefield, both famous amateur clubs, to take part, but neither could turn up, and two Athenian teams took on Hearts and Hibernian in ten-minute matches at the close of proceedings, the club losing both matches heavily.

Rather ambitiously, the club joined the Scottish Football Association in August 1887, and entered the 1887–88 Scottish Cup. It was drawn at home to West Calder in the first round, but had to switch the tie as it did not have a ground suitable to host the match, and was "very short-handed" following "little to no practice"; West Calder scored 5 with the wind in the first half and 4 in the second, the Athenians not getting on the scoresheet.

The club's ambitions had over-run it; it had even set up a friendly with the mighty Vale of Leven following the West Calder tie, but judiciously telegraphed two days beforehand to say that the Athenians could not raise a team. There were higher hopes for the club's debut in the Edinburgh Shield, against fellow amateurs Adventurers, considered a "comparatively light one". Despite fielding a stronger side, the Athenians suffered another heavy defeat, this time 5–0; Adventurers scoring once against the run of play in the first half, but dominant in the second, the Athenian collapse put down to "want of combined action" and a lack of practice.

The club continued playing friendlies through the season, against prestigious sides such as Queen's Park, Dumbarton, and St Bernards, but suffering heavy defeats every time. Enthusiasm ran out quickly, in January 1888 the club sending a wire to Dundee to cancel a friendly against Strathmore the day before the match, and not even bothering to notify West Calder that it was not turning up. By March the club was said to be out of money.

It was considered something of a moral success to "not get much of a thrashing" at Queen of the South Wanderers in April, the score being 4–2. Athenian finally avoided defeat with a 1–1 draw at West Calder later the same month, the XI boosted by M'Kinnon and Henderson of Hearts, and Lyle from Dumfries Wanderers. The momentum was kept up with a 1–1 draw at Motherwell but the club did not play eleven-a-side football again.

The club's final outing was in an unsuccessful outing in a five-a-side tournament in May, at which time "it still had something to learn". There was however not enough time, even the Hearts hosting a benefit match against a select west of Scotland side under the name I Zingari (which included Ings, Ballantyne, and Knox of the Athenians) not enough to keep the club afloat - although at least the three Athenian players finally found themselves on a winning side, I Zingari winning 3–2. Its short existence was confirmed at an end when it was thrown off the Scottish FA's register for non-payment of subscription in August 1888. The club had entered the Shield before its disbanding, but as being "evidently a club of the past" its scheduled first round opponent Claremont Park gained a walkover.

== Colours ==
The club's official colours were primrose and pale blue "harlequin" shirts. Perhaps reflecting the club's financial difficulties towards the end of its first season, or the formation of the side from members of rugby clubs, Athenian wore "no less than five colours of dress" in a defeat at Leith Athletic in March 1888.

== Ground ==
The club played at Crawford Road Park, in Newington, a former cricket pitch. The first match the club had there was against Battlefield on 1 October, the visitors winning 1–0.

== See also ==
- Edinburgh Casuals, Trinity, and Edinburgh City, three other attempts to form amateur football clubs in Edinburgh in the professional era.
