= Irvine Academicals F.C. =

Association football club in Scotland

Irvine Academicals
- Full name: Irvine Academicals Football Club
- Nickname(s): the Acas
- Founded: 1902
- Dissolved: 1905
- Secretary: A. P. MacLachlan
Home colours

Irvine Academicals F.C. was a football club from the town of Irvine, Ayrshire, Scotland.

== History ==
The club was formed in late 1902 to provide a pure amateur side in the town, and had no exclusive link with the Irvine Academy; the club secretary, MacLachlan, had been involved with Glasgow University F.C., and it also had interest from Moffat and Fletcher from Queen's Park.

The club had a bright start, beating the Ayr amateur side Ayr Parkhouse 2–1 in its first match, and proved a popular attraction in the town, a good crowd defying the rain to support the side against a Scottish Amateur XI in February 1903.

The club duly joined the Scottish Football Association in August 1903 and entered the Scottish Qualifying Cup competition. The club however lost 6–0 at Kilwinning Eglinton in the first round, a result which "was in no way surprising".

Undaunted, the club also entered the Ayrshire and Renfrewshire Football League, which was undertaking its first season in 1903–04, with six entrants. The Acas drew 2–2 with Paisley Academical in a "pleasant" first match, but lost the other 4 matches it played before withdrawing from the competition.

The Acas therefore found succour in the Scottish Amateur Football League, but withdrew after losing its first two matches.

Despite this first season of almost total blanks, it entered the Qualifying Cup again for 1904–05, but scratched when drawn to visit Beith. Indeed, the club does not seem to have played at all in the season and it was struck from the Scottish FA roll in August 1905.

== Colours ==
The club played in blue and white.

== Ground ==
The club's ground was at Kersland Field.
