= Helensburgh Union F.C. =

Former association football club in Scotland

Helensburgh Union
- Full name: Helensburgh Union
- Nickname: Union
- Founded: 1894
- Dissolved: 1899
- Ground: Ardencaple Park
- Hon. President: W. H. Kidston
- President: D. S. McLachlan
- Secretary: George Watt, John Currie
Home colours

Helensburgh Union F.C. was a nineteenth-century association football club from Helensburgh in Dunbartonshire, Scotland.

== History ==
The Helensburgh, Dunbartonshire club was founded as a junior club in 1894. It made its first appearance in the Dunbartonshire Junior Cup, losing to Lenzie Juniors in the second round; Union had won the tie 6–1, but fielded ineligible players, and Lenzie won 4–2 after a 3–3 draw.

Despite the decimation of senior clubs in the Dunbartonshire are in the professional era, Union decided to turn senior for the 1895–96 season. Its first tie in the Scottish Qualifying Cup was a 4–3 defeat at Clackmannan, having had a two-goal lead and surviving a missed penalty; the Union protested on the basis that referee Hutton had not stopped the Wee County's players from taking running throw-ins, but as Hutton wired the Scottish Football Association that nobody had raised a protest with him at the time, the Union's protest was dismissed.

The club beat an under-strength Clydebank United 3–1 in the quarter-final of the Dunbartonshire Cup, and a 2–0 defeat to Renton in the semi-final was not a disgrace. However its last entry into the Qualifying Cup in 1896–97 demonstrated the club's true position. On the face of it, a 4–4 draw with Duntocher Harp in the first round seemed to be a step forwards, but Harp only played with 9 men all match. With a full complement the Harp won 6–0. The club shortly afterwards changed its name to Helensburgh, and by November Helensburgh Ardencaple, which led to some confusion that the club was the same as the Ardencaple club - or that the club was seeking a way to avoid debts, as it had been suspended for not paying off a guarantee to the Cameronians club.

The club however could not compete at senior level, and was struck from the Scottish FA roll in August 1897, reverting to junior status until being forced to "lie off" in 1899.

== Colours ==
The club wore light blue shirts and white knickers.

== Ground ==
The club played at Ardencaple Park, described as shaped like a lane for its narrowness. It later hosted Scottish League football as the home of a later Helensburgh F.C.
