= Dumfries & Galloway Cup =

- Founded: 1898
- Abolished: 1931
- Region: Dumfries and Galloway
- Most successful club(s): St Cuthbert's Wanderers (5 wins)

The Dumfries & Galloway Cup was an association football cup competition for clubs in the historic counties of Dumfriesshire, Wigtownshire, and Kirkcudbrightshire, Scotland.

== Format ==
The competition was a knock-out tournament contested by the member clubs of the Dumfries & Galloway Football Association. There was considerable overlap with the Southern Counties Football Association and the competition was considered subordinate to the Southern Counties Cup.

== Initial entrants ==
- 6th G.R.V.
- Annan
- Dumfries
- Dumfries Hibernians
- Newton Stewart (Athletic)
- Stranraer
- Vale of Fleet
- Wigtown

== History ==
The first competition, in 1898–99, was won by the 6th G.R.V., who beat Newton Stewart away in a replay, after a 5–5 draw at home in the first match.

The second two finals saw Dumfries beat local rivals Dumfries Hibernians, although the second final (at Dalbeattie) was considered a "mediocre" game.

The competition left Dumfries again when Douglas Wanderers from Castle Douglas beat Dumfries 3–1 in a replay at Dalbeattie.

Newton Stewart took the trophy for the first time in 1906–07 without having to play the final; on the scheduled date of 11 May, Newton Stewart was playing in the Wigtownshire Cup final, but Douglas Wanderers apparently scratched as Newton Stewart was awarded the Dumfries trophy as well. There appears to have been no final in 1907–08, given a lack of time in the calendar; St Cuthbert's Wanderers won the trophy by default in 1908–09, after Dumfries refused to play the final on the arranged date. There was no competition in 1909–10 and an attempt was made in 1910–11 to play the competition as a league rather than cup, but the tournament did not complete. After Dalbeattie Star won a regular knockout tournament in 1911–12, the competition was in abeyance for the next decade.

The competition returned in 1923–24, but after Dalbeattie Star won the competition for the fourth time in 1930–31, it was abandoned.

== Finals (incomplete) ==
Year	Winner	Score	Runner-up
1898–99	6th G.R.V.	5–5, ?	Newton Stewart
1899–1900	Dumfries	5–3	Dumfries Hibernians
1900–01	Dumfries	4–2	Dumfries Hibernians
1901–02	Douglas Wanderers	0–0, 3–1	Dumfries
1902–03	Maxwelltown Volunteers	4–1	Nithsdale Wanderers
1903–04	Maxwelltown Volunteers	2–1	Douglas Wanderers
1904–05	Dumfries	0–0, 2–1	6th G.R.V.
1905–06	Dumfries	6–0	Nithsdale Wanderers
1906–07	Newton Stewart	w/o	Douglas Wanderers
1907–08	Maxwelltown Volunteers	w/o	Dumfries
1908–09	St Cuthbert's Wanderers	w/o	Dumfries
1923–24	Stranraer	?–?	St Cuthbert's Wanderers
1924–25	St Cuthbert's Wanderers	?–?	?
1925–26	St Cuthbert's Wanderers	4–0	Stranraer
1926–27	St Cuthbert's Wanderers	4–0	?
1927–28	Dalbeattie Star	1–1, 2–1	St Cuthbert's Wanderers
1928–29	Dalbeattie Star	?–?	?
1929–30	St Cuthbert's Wanderers	?–?	?
1930–31	Dalbeattie Star	1–1, 3–2	Solway Star
