= Nithsdale F.C. (1895) =

Former association football club in Scotland

- Full name: Nithsdale
- Nickname(s): the Vale
- Founded: 1895
- Dissolved: 1899
- Ground: Cresswell Park
- Match Secretary: W. J. Stark
Home colours

Nithsdale Football Club was an association football club from Dumfries in Scotland, active in the 1890s.

== History ==
The club is first recorded playing Junior football in the 1895–96 season. Nithsdale took part in the Southern Counties Cup in 1896–97, winning one tie, and turned senior by joining the Scottish Football Association in August 1897. Unlike other senior teams in the area Nithsdale remained a purely amateur side.

The club only had two seasons as a senior club. Its 1897–98 season was quite successful, as the club hammered St Cuthbert's Wanderers 5–0 in the first round of the Scottish Qualifying Cup, and only narrowly went down to Dumfries Hibernians in the second round. It also won two ties in the Southern Counties Cup, and Dumfries F.C. required a replay to beat Nithsdale in the semi-final. It had been one of the best organized clubs in the Southern Counties League, playing 11 of the scheduled 12 games, but other clubs had barely played half (causing Nithsdale to withdraw temporarily), and the league collapsed unfinished.

Its 1898–99 season however was disastrous. The club lost the use of Cresswell Park as the owner decided it could no longer host all of the Dumfries clubs, and Dumfries was successful with its bid to retain a tenancy. Nithsdale consequently lost at least four players (Anderson, Chicken, Johnstone, and Charteris) to Dumfries at the start of the season.

The denuded and homeless Nithsdale lost to Annan in the Qualifying Cup, and, despite strengthening the side by bringing in three players for its Southern Counties first round tie with Dumfries Hibs, went down 11–0. The club was formally struck off the Scottish FA register in April 1899 for no longer having its own private ground.

== Colours ==
The club originally wore white jerseys, but on turning senior changed to blue and white.

== Ground ==
As a junior club, it played at Moray Park, but as a senior it shared Cresswell Park with Dumfries and Dumfries Hibs. The initial rent was £5, but it went up to £27 10s in 1897, and it could not afford the £50 rent being demanded for sole occupation in 1898.
