= William Paul (footballer, born 1868) =

Scottish footballer

Personal information
- Date of birth: 5 August 1868
- Place of birth: Paisley, Scotland
- Date of death: 3 August 1932 (aged 63)
- Place of death: Paisley, Scotland
- Position: Full back

Senior career*
Years	Team	Apps	(Gls)
- Dykebar
- Paisley Academicals

International career
1891	Scotland	1	(0)
- * Club domestic league appearances and goals

William Paul (5 August 1868 – 3 August 1932) was a Scottish footballer who played as a full back.

== Career ==
Born in Paisley, Paul played club football for Dykebar and Paisley Academicals, and made one appearance for Scotland in 1891; he was the only serving Dykebar player to have been selected for international duty. He later worked in schools football and became a prominent figure in the laundry industry.
