= Rock F.C. =

Association football club in Dunbartonshire, Scotland

Rock
- Full name: Rock Football Club
- Founded: 1882
- Dissolved: 1890
- Ground: Netherbog Park
- Hon. Secretary: James Hastie
- Match Secretary: William Meikle
Home colours

Rock Football Club, usually referred to as Dumbarton Rock, was an association football club based in the town of Dumbarton, in West Dunbartonshire.

== History ==
The club was formed in 1882, made up of abstemious Clyde shipyard workers of Irish extraction, and, after an 1883–84 season in which it won 12 of 22 matches, it joined the Scottish Football Association. The club may have been influenced by having a match secretary, William Meikle, who had previously held the role at Pollokshields Athletic.

The club therefore entered the Scottish Cup and Dumbartonshire Cup for the first time in 1884–85. In the Scottish, the club lost 2–0 to Yoker, a protest against Christie of Yoker not being properly registered being dismissed, although Rock did not lose the protest deposit. Rock also lost in the first round of the Dumbartonshire, to Vale of Leven Wanderers.

The club's Irish links helped it get an invitation to Ireland to play a friendly with Limavady, which Rock won 6–4, and strong enough to draw with a strong Dundee Our Boys on a trip to Tayside at the end of the season. The club seemed to have finished the season on a high, as its reserve side reached the final of the Dumbartonshire Junior Cup by beating Renton Athletic, but for some reason the Athletic was put into the final, which it duly won.

Despite an active season, the club never seems to have played another match. In 1885–86, the club reached the second round of the Scottish Cup, because opponents Levendale scratched; but Rock in turn scratched to Albion in the second. It seems to have had its talent raided by other local sides - in the 1885–86 season, centre-half Hartley and forward Gourlay were playing for Dumbarton, itself having lost players to the professional English game, and left-forwards Kerr and Galbraith were at Dumbarton Athletic.

The club left the Scottish FA in August 1886, so could not enter the Scottish Cup again, but had a remarkable afterlife, entering the Dumbartonshire Cup every season from 1885–86 to 1890–91 and scratching before the first tie every time.

== Colours ==
The club's colours were blue jerseys, white knickers, and red hose.

== Ground ==
The club played at Netherbog Park on Cemetery Road.
