= Aberdeen Harp F.C. =

Association football club in Aberdeen, Scotland

Aberdeen Harp
- Full name: Aberdeen Harp F.C.
- Nickname: Granite City Irishmen
- Founded: 1904
- Dissolved: 1911
- Ground: Central Park
Home colours

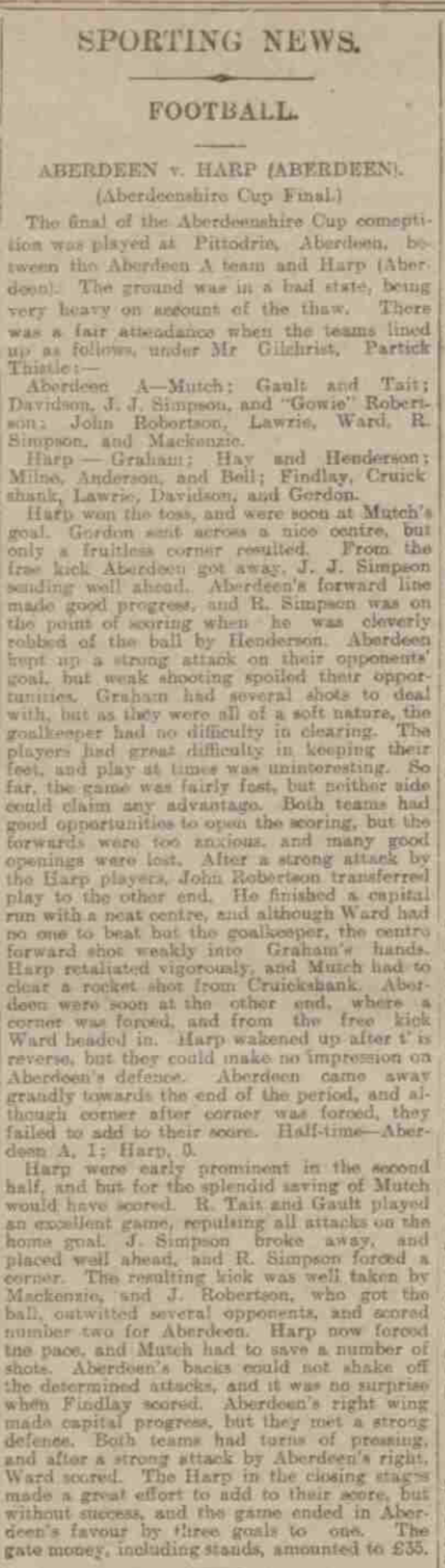
1906–07 Aberdeenshire Cup final, Aberdeen A 3–1 Aberdeen Harp, Aberdeen Press and Journal, 4 February 1907

Aberdeen Harp F.C. was an association football club from Aberdeen, active in the 1900s.

== History ==
The earliest record of the club is from 1904; it was unrelated to a previous Aberdeen Harp which played in the 1889–90 season.

The club's earliest competitive football came in the Aberdeenshire Cup in the 1904–05 season, and it entered the competition every season until 1911–12. Its first season in the competition was its best, as it won through to the final, only losing 3–2 to the new combination Aberdeen F.C. side, albeit a reserve Aberdeen XI. Harp repeated the run to the final in 1906–07 but this time lost 3–1 to the same outfit.

These entries encouraged the club to join the Scottish Football Association in 1907 (an application the previous year had been refused), and it entered the Scottish Qualifying Cup in 1907–08 for the first time. Its first match as a senior club was a 5–3 win at Montrose in a friendly, and it followed this up by beating Peterhead 3–2 in its first Qualifying Cup tie, a Peterhead protest that linesman William Jeffrey (of Aberdeen F.C.) was a suspended player not getting any traction. However McIntyre was suspended for a month for rough play in the tie. Harp lost in a replay at Elgin City in the second round, having conceded a last-minute equalizer in the original tie.

In 1909–10, Harp reached the third round of the qualifying cup, one round short of earning automatic qualification to the Scottish Cup proper, but lost 3–0 at East Fife, Willie Wilkie scoring a first-half hat-trick; Wilkie had scored a hat-trick two weeks earlier in a Scottish League match, which had been the Fifers' first-ever hat-trick in the competition.

1910–11 was the club's final season at a competitive level. It gained its biggest win - 8–2 over Peterhead Hibernians in the Qualifying Cup first round - and it was struck from the Scottish FA's membership roll in August 1911.

== Colours ==
The club wore maroon jerseys.

== Ground ==
The club's ground was Central Park, but it often played home Cup ties at Pittodrie, or ceded home advantage for Cup ties, for instance in its record win over Peterhead Hibs and in the Aberdeenshire Cup in 1909–10. Harp lost its ground for the 1908–09 season, which almost caused it to lose its Scottish FA membership.
