= John Neilson Former Pupils F.C. =

Former association football club in Scotland

John Neilson FPs
- Full name: John Neilson Former Pupils F.C.
- Founded: 1908
- Dissolved: 1912
- Ground: Greenlaw Park
Likely colours

The John Neilson Former Pupils F.C. was an old boy association football club from Paisley, Renfrewshire.

== History ==
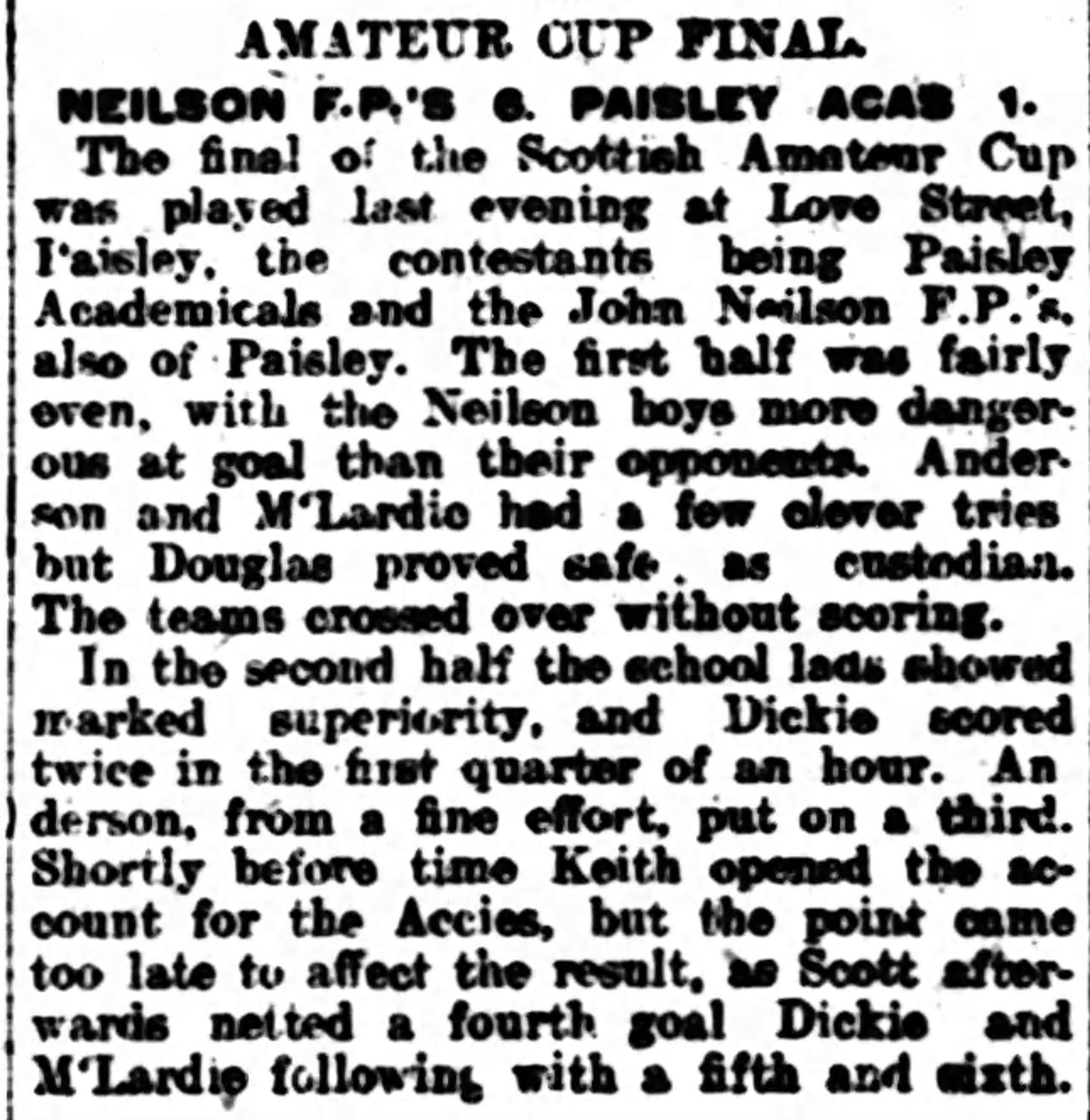
1909–10 Scottish Amateur Cup final, John Neilson FPs 6–1 Paisley Academicals, Daily Record, 29 April 1910

The club was formed for former pupils of the John Neilson Institute, later the John Neilson High School, and the first reference to the club is its unsuccessful attempt to join the Scottish Football Association in 1908. Instead the club joined the Glasgow and District League.

The club had ample consolation by winning the first Scottish Amateur Cup in 1909–10, beating fellow Paisley old boy side Paisley Academicals 6–1 at Love Street in the final, all of the goals coming in the second half.

Perhaps in response to the Paisley Grammar FPs side joining the Scottish FA in 1912, the John Neilson FPs merged with the Academicals, whose side hitherto had also included Paisley Grammar School alumni, before the 1912–13 season. The club mostly used the Academicals name, especially in connection with entries to the Scottish Cup, but the John Neilson FPs name was used in the more specific circumstance of a former pupils' league from 1923 to 1930, and again in 1951–52, plus in the 1919–20 Amateur Cup. In 1929–30, the John Neilson FPs name was also used in the Renfrewshire Cup's subsidiary tournament, the Renfrewshire Victoria Cup.

== Colours ==
The school colour was maroon.

== Ground ==
The club played at Greenlaw Park, as did the other Paisley old boy sides.
