= Edinburgh Casuals F.C. =

Former association football club in Scotland

(Edinburgh) Casuals
- Full name: Edinburgh Casuals F.C.
- Founded: 1894
- Dissolved: 1896
- Ground: Denham Green
- Match Secretary: Thomas Agnew
Home colours

Edinburgh Casuals F.C. was a short-lived association football club from Edinburgh.

== History ==
In August 1894, at a meeting at the Café Royal in Edinburgh, several gentlemen of the city resolved to form an amateur association club to represent the city. After some canvassing of interest, the club was formed on 16 August 1894, under the name Edinburgh Casuals, although the club was officially registered simply as Casuals.

The club joined the Scottish Football Association shortly afterwards, by which time its membership had swelled to 120, and asked for exemption from the first two rounds of the preliminary stages of the 1894–95 Scottish Cup, on the basis that the same boon was usually granted to Edinburgh University A.F.C. (so games were played after the start of term), and the club anticipated using University affiliates. However the request was refused, and club was plunged into the first preliminary at Penicuik Athletic with a reserve XI as its first choice players were unavailable, losing 4–2.

The club's first home match was against the more proletarian amateurs of Adventurers, in the second round of the 1894–95 East of Scotland Shield, the East of Scotland Association being more generous in allowing a first round bye; the visitors won 8–1. The Casuals did pick up a 3–0 win over Mossend Swifts the next month, the ethos and exclusivity of the club demonstrated by a note that "the coarseness of the visitors' play was a matter of comment by the few spectators that were present". By this time the club had attracted players from newly-professional sides who wanted to stay amateur, such as Goodfellow and Davidson from Heart of Midlothian, Lee from Hibernian, and Smith and Cowie from Leith Athletic.

The club's final home game was also against the Adventurers, the failure of the experiment made apparent by "less than half-a-dozen spectators" watching a 3–1 defeat. The club continued into 1895–96, and lost 4–3 at Raith Rovers in the Qualifying Cup, the result being so close as the Rovers had to scramble to put together a team at the last minute after six players were suspended for "irregularities", Rovers even including some "rugbyites". In the first round of the Shield, the Casuals lost 5–0 at Polton Vale, and a 5–2 defeat at Penicuik Athleric seems to have been the club's last match. The club was effectively replaced by Trinity, a junior club which turned senior in August 1896, and which also cleft to amateurism.

== Colours ==
The club wore maroon and white shirts with blue (serge) knickers. This may have been inspired by Edinburgh University, which wore maroon and white at least until 1884.

== Ground ==
The club played at Denham Green, in the Trinity area.

== Notable players ==
- George Goodfellow, who played for Heart of Midlothan in the 1891 Scottish Cup final

== See also ==
- Edinburgh City and Athenian, two other attempts to form high-class amateur football clubs in Edinburgh in the professional era
