= Albion F.C. (1880) =

Association football club in Dunbartonshire, Scotland

Albion
- Full name: Albion Football Club
- Founded: 1880
- Dissolved: 1886
- Ground: Victoria Park, Castle Road
- Patron: Archibald Denny
- President: Alex Galbraith
- Match Secretary: Robert Smith
Home colours

Albion Football Club was an association football club based in the town of Dumbarton, in West Dunbartonshire.

== History ==
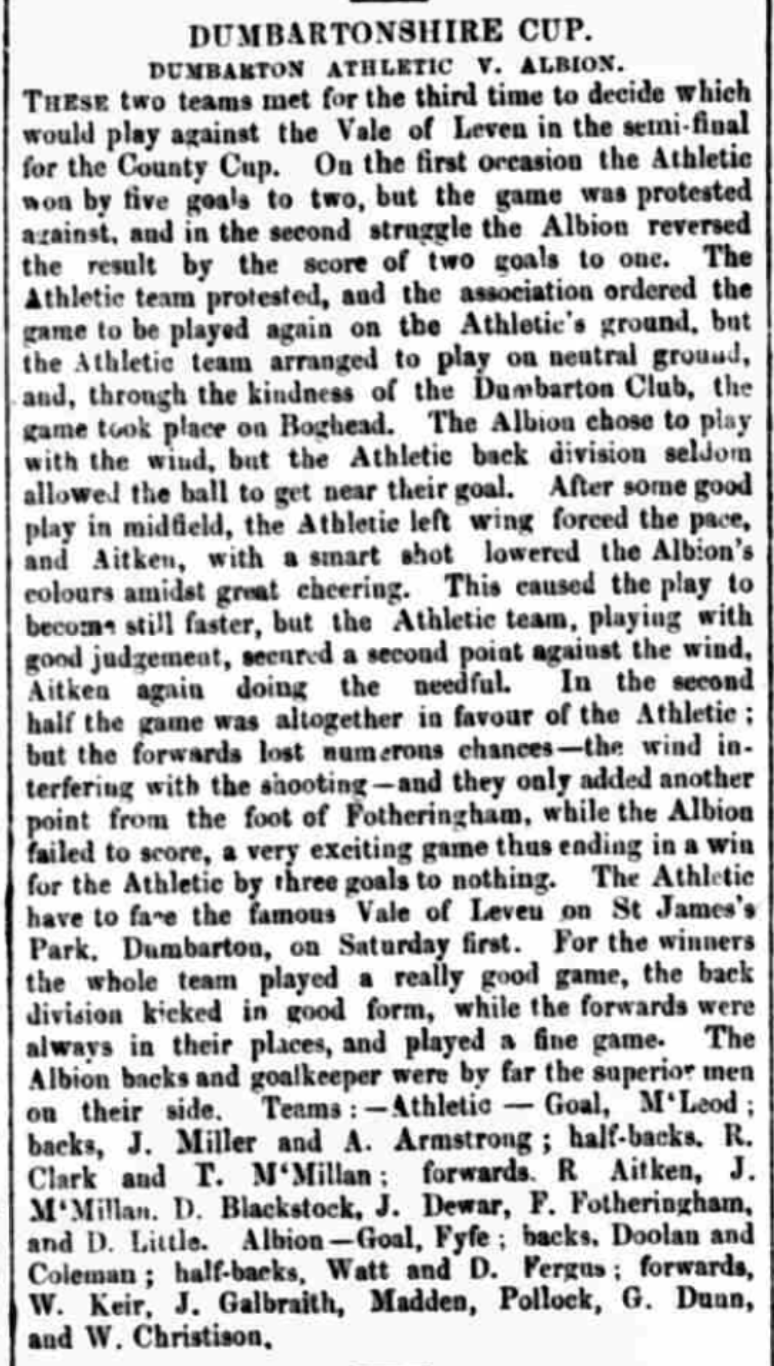
1884–85 Dumbartonshire Cup 2nd Round, Dumbarton Athletic 3–0 Albion, Lennox Herald, 17 January 1885

The club was founded in 1880 with its official name as simply Albion. It was sometimes referred by the media as Dumbarton Albion to avoid confusion with other Albions. As Archibald Denny agreed to patronize the club, and the Albion shipping company commissioned ships from Denny's company, the club may have been in origin a works side for the Albion company.

Given the strength of the three main Dumbartonshire sides (Renton, Vale of Leven, and Dumbarton), as well as other well-established clubs in the area such as Jamestown and the Vale of Leven Wanderers, it was difficult for Albion to establish itself. It spent four years playing minor football before joining the Scottish Football Association in August 1884 and entered the Scottish Cup in 1884–85, losing 2–0 to Dumbarton in its first tie. The club also entered the Dumbartonshire Cup for the first time, being knocked out in the second round by Dumbarton Athletic in a tie which needed three attempts to complete. Athletic won the first, but Albion put in a protest, and won the second tie 2–1. However, Athletic put in a counter-protest on two grounds - namely the Albion protest had been out of time, and the ball was undersized - and the Dumbarton FA ordered a further replay, which was held at Boghead, and which Athletic won 3–0.

The club's best run in the Scottish Cup was in its second and final entry, in 1885–86. The club drew 4–4 at home with Jamestown in the first round, despite having to rely on four second XI men, perhaps indicating difficulties in raising a team with more attractive clubs for the players to join. Albion won the replay with a goal ten minutes from time, and walked over Dumbarton Rock in the second. Nobody gave the club a chance in the third round against Cup-holders Renton, especially after the club was hammered 8–1 by Vale of Leven the previous week in the Dumbarton Cup. However, the club played above itself, and, in a hard-fought game, only went down 1–0.

The club had 52 members in its final season, a not insubstantial number, but making it one of the smaller clubs in the county. With such strong competition on its doorstep, the club has no reported matches after February 1886, and was removed from the Scottish FA register five months later. The "Dumbarton Albion" name was used in 1888 by an unrelated club.

== Colours ==
The club's colours were 1" blue and white hooped jerseys and stockings, with white knickers.

== Ground ==
The club played at Victoria Park on Castle Road, a 2-minute walk from the pier. The ground was later used by Newtown Thistle.

== Notable players ==
- John Madden, who played for Albion in 1885
- James Galbraith, a player for Albion in 1884–85 and 1885–86
