= Thomas Cherry =

Scottish footballer

Personal information
- Date of birth: 1873
- Place of birth: Torphichen, Scotland
- Position: Wing half

Senior career*
Years	Team	Apps	(Gls)
1894–1895	East Benhar Heatherbell		
1895–1897	Motherwell	3	(0)
1897–1898	Hamilton Academical	5	(0)
1898–1899	Grimsby Town	7	(0)
1900–1???	East Benhar Rangers		
- * Club domestic league appearances and goals

Thomas Cherry (1873 – after 1898) was a Scottish professional footballer who played as a wing half.
