= Levendale F.C. =

Association football club in Dunbartonshire, Scotland

Levendale
- Full name: Levendale Football Club
- Founded: 1879
- Dissolved: 1885
- Ground: Balloch Road
- Hon. Secretary: James Brown
- Match Secretary: Peter Walker
Home colours

Levendale Football Club was a football club from Alexandria, Dunbartonshire, active in the 19th century.

== History ==
The club was founded in 1879 in the wake of fellow Alexandria side Vale of Leven. It joined the Scottish Football Association in 1883, after winning 5 of its 10 matches in 1882–83, although one of its players (James Buchanan) had suffered a serious leg break in a friendly against the 1st D.R.V. in February (which Levendale nevertheless won 7–1).

Levendale was always a minnow on the Dunbartonshire scene, never claiming more than 30 members; in its final season it was the smallest club in Dunbartonshire. Given the power of the county in the Scottish game - from 1875 to 1888, only one Scottish Cup final did not include a club from the shire - the chances of such a small club ever gaining success were non-existent.

This was borne out by Levendale's record in competitive football. The Scottish Cup was drawn on a regional basis in the era and the only tie the club played - against Vale of Leven in its first entry, in the 1883–84 Scottish Cup - was a 12–0 defeat, 9 of the goals coming in the first half. Faced with the same sort of humiliation the following season against Dumbarton, the club scratched, allowing Dumbarton to arrange a more lucrative friendly with Walsall Swifts - the speed of such arrangements suggesting Levendale had accepted a consideration to step down.

Levendale also withdrew from its two entries in the Dunbartonshire Cup in 1884–85 and 1885–86, and even scratched to the moribund Rock in the first round of the 1885–86 Scottish Cup.

A new Levendale club was formed in 1889, which turned senior in 1892.

== Colours ==
The club wore blue jerseys and hose, and white knickers.

== Ground ==
The club's home ground was on Balloch Road, 5 minutes' walk from the station, which it shared with Jamestown.

== Notable players ==
- Alexander Henderson, who also played for Vale of Leven and Renton
