= Newtown Thistle F.C. =

Association football club in Dunbartonshire, Scotland

Newtown Thistle
- Full name: Newtown Thistle F.C.
- Nickname(s): the Thistle
- Founded: 1888
- Dissolved: 1899
- Ground: Victoria Park
- Secretary: Neil Lang, John Walker
Home colours

Newtown Thistle F.C. was an association football club from Dumbarton in Scotland, active in the 19th century.

== History ==
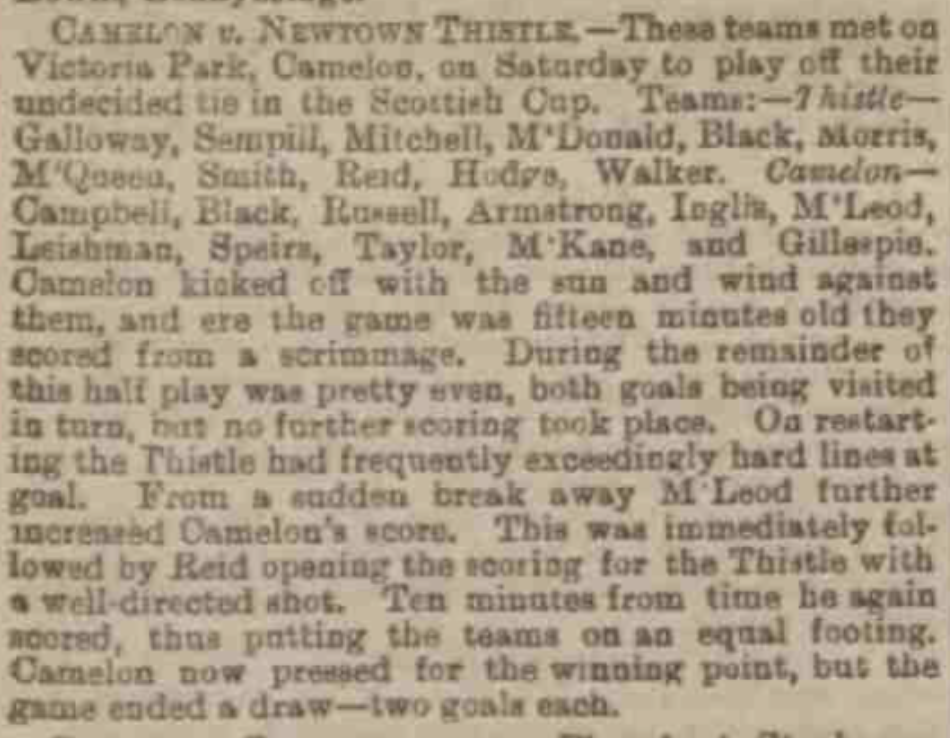
1895–96 Scottish Qualifying Cup 1st Round replay, Camelon 2–2 Newtown Thistle, Falkirk Herald, 11 September 1895

There has been a number of clubs with the name Newtown Thistle, but the only one which became a senior club was the Dumbarton side. The earliest recorded match for the club was a 6–2 win over Sinclair Athletic in September 1888, and the club played juvenile football in its earliest years; it won the Dumbarton Juvenile Cup in 1891–92, beating Bonhill Kirkland 6–0 in the final.

The club turned senior in 1894, entering the 1894–95 Scottish Cup and Dumbartonshire Cup. It lost in the first preliminary round of the national competition, 7–2 at King's Park; in the county, it beat Duntocher Harp in its first tie, but lost in the semi-final to Renton.

Thistle's only other competitive win came in the first round of the 1895–96 Scottish Qualifying Cup, a replacement for the preliminary rounds of the national competition, when it beat Camelon in a second replay, at the neutral Barrowfield Park ground, the home of Clyde F.C. In the second round the club let slip a lead to go down 3–2 at Blantyre, a lack of training being blamed.

The rise of professionalism and the Scottish League killed off most of the clubs in the smaller towns, or those which shared a town with a more established side. Newtown Thistle lasted longer than most; in 1898, it was one of only four senior clubs left in Dumbartonshire, and the only one not in the Scottish League. This reduction of clubs meant that Newtown's only other fixtures in the Dumbartonshire Cup were both semi-final matches, but the Thistle lost them both.

However the pressure finally told; the Thistle lost 6–1 at home to Renton in the 1897–98 Qualifying Cup, and did not bother entering the Dumbartonshire Cup. It withdrew from the Qualifying Cup in 1898–99 when paired with Vale of Leven, and was removed from the Scottish FA roll in April 1899.

== Colours ==
The club originally wore dark blue shirts and white knickers. In 1898 it changed to light blue shirts.

== Ground ==
The club's ground was Victoria Park, formerly the ground of Albion, on the corner of Castle Road and Afton Street (now Castlegreen Street), a 2-minute walk from the pier.
