= Paisley Academical F.C. =

Former association football club in Scotland

Paisley Academical
- Full name: Paisley Academical F.C.
- Nicknames: the Gilded Youths, Acas, the Accies, the Academicals
- Founded: 1890
- Dissolved: 1953
- Ground: Greenlaw Park
1890–97 colours	1912–53 colours

Paisley Academical F.C. was an old boy association football club from Paisley, Renfrewshire.

== History ==
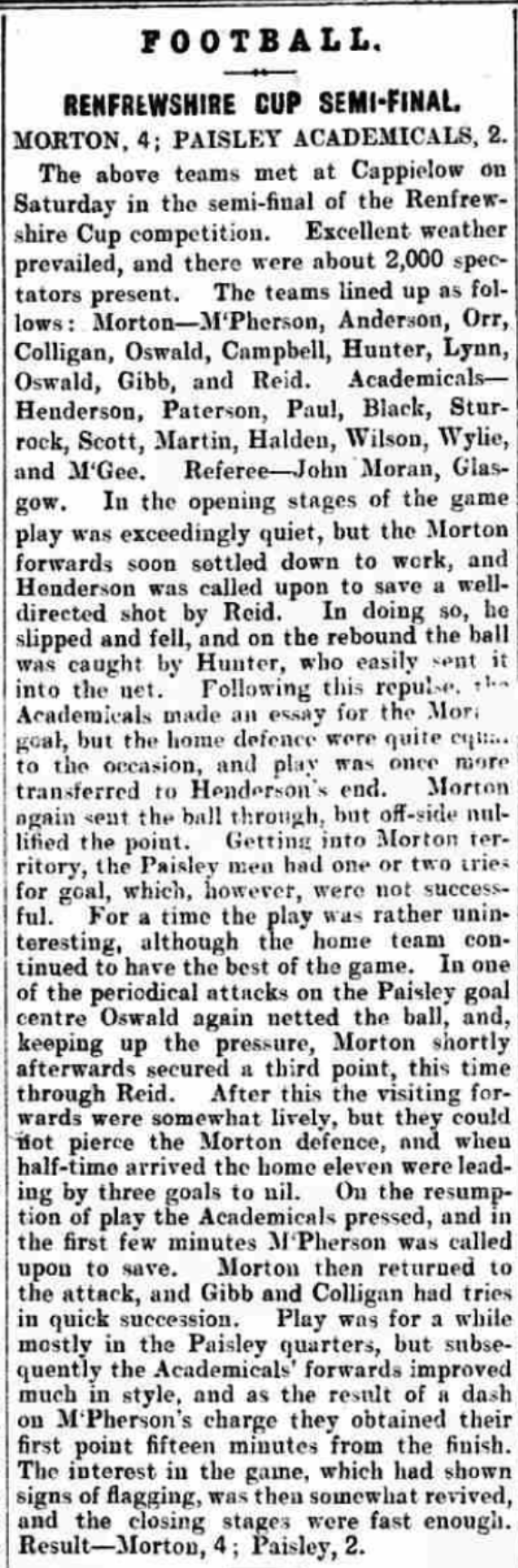
1899–1900 Renfrewshire Cup semi-final, Morton 4–2 Paisley Academical, Greenock Telegraph, 2 April 1900

The club was founded in 1890 for pupils and former pupils at the Paisley Grammar School in Renfrewshire. The name was reported as Academical or Academicals, but the name the club gave officially was the singular.

The club was a regular entrant to the Renfrewshire Cup from 1891–92 to 1935–36 and the Scottish Qualifying Cup from 1895 to 1896, having also played in the last Scottish Cup qualifying section in 1894–95. Given its narrow constituency, the club was usually outclassed. Its last win in the Renfrewshire Cup for instance coming in 1903–04, when it beat Johnstone in the first round. The only time the club won more than one tie in the competition was 1899–1900, which put the club into a semi-final against Morton. Paisley had been drawn at home, but, "disappointed" in the lack of town support, switched the tie to Cappielow Park, and was rewarded with an attendance of 2,000. However the professional side won 4–2.

The club's chances diminished after the formation of the Paisley Grammar School Former Pupils F.C., whose potential membership overlapped with the Academicals, and which was originally tabbed only to play in specific Old Boy leagues, but which also joined the Scottish FA and Renfrewshire Association in 1912. Perhaps in response to this, the Academicals merged with the John Neilson FPs before the 1912–13 season, and used the Academicals name for nearly all purposes afterwards.

The Academicals played in the main section of the Scottish Cup twice, in 1929–30 and 1934–35. The former time the club had the significant luck of the draw, being given byes through to the third round of the southern section, putting it into the first round proper; in the Qualifying Cup, the club lost 6–0 at home to St Cuthbert Wanderers. In the Cup itself, reigning Cup-holders Kilmarnock gained its biggest-ever Cup win, beating the Academicals 11–1; the Academicals held out for 15 minutes, but were seven down by half-time, and Jimmy Weir scored a double hat-trick for Killie.

In 1934–35 the club again had the benefit of two byes, and beat the Greenock High School Former Pupils in the third round of the southern section of the Qualifying Cup, earning a spot in round one proper. At the next stage in the Qualifying Cup, the Academicals lost 5–0 to Rosyth Dockyard Recreation, and in the Cup itself 7–0 to Albion Rovers, Renwick scoring four and Lyon three.

At an amateur level, the club had more success. It was runner-up in the Scottish Amateur Cup in its first instalment in 1909–10, losing to its future partner the John Neilson FPs in the final at Love Street, and was the first champion in the Scottish Amateur Football League in 1901–02, heading (amongst others) Ayr Parkhouse in the final table. It regained the title in 1904–05. It also played in the first season of the Ayrshire and Renfrewshire Football League in 1903–04, finishing fourth of six in the almost-completed final table.

The last references to the club playing date from the 1952–53 season.

== Colours ==
The club's original colours were navy jerseys and white knickers. From 1897 to 1912 its colours were blue shirts and white knickers, and from 1912 black and white.

== Ground ==
The club played at Greenlaw Park.

== Notable player ==
- William Paul, who played for Scotland whilst at Dykebar
