= Cartvale F.C. (1892) =

Football club in Scotland

Cartvale (second)
- Full name: Cartvale Football Club
- Founded: 1892
- Dissolved: 1909
- Ground: Cartsbridge Park
- Secretary: J. M'Ghie
from 1896 colours

Cartvale Football Club was a football club from the town of Busby, East Renfrewshire.

== History ==
The club was founded in 1892 under the name Busby Victoria and changed its name to Cartvale after one season. Although the club was a constant entrant to the Scottish Cup from 1892 to 1909, it only went through the qualifying rounds once, in 1897–98. After beating Bathgate in the first round with three late goals, Cartvale lost 12–0 to Rangers in the second, in front of 2,000 spectators at Ibrox Park, seven of the goals coming in the first half.

Cartvale was a little more successful in the Renfrewshire Cup, winning two ties to reach the semi-final in 1894–95, where the club lost 2–0 to Arthurlie.

The club was a founder member of the revived Midland Football League in 1903–04, but the league was abandoned in an unfinished state, and Cartvale only completed 8 out of the scheduled 16 matches.

== Colours ==
The club originally wore light blue jerseys with white knickers. In May 1896 the club voted to change to "play in Queen's Park colours" of black and white hoops.

== Ground ==
The 1892 Cartvale club played at the same Cartsbridge Park ground as the original Cartvale club.
