= Dumfries F.C. (1889) =

Former association football club in Scotland

Dumfries Football Club
- Full name: Dumfries
- Founded: 1889
- Dissolved: 1892
- Ground: Recreation Grounds
- President: James Cradock
Dumfries colours	St John's colours

Dumfries Football Club was an association football club from Dumfries, Scotland.

== History ==
The club was founded in June 1889, with Robert Reid MP as the club's honorary President, nine honorary vice-presidents, one actual President and eight actual vice-presidents, two honorary secretaries, one match secretary, and 33 committee members The club was the second association club to use the Dumfries name, but it claimed to be a continuation of the Nithsdale club, although it sported different colours and played at a former Nithsdale ground.

Dumfries entered the Scottish Cup for the first time in 1889–90, losing 8–0 at Moffat in the first round. The club's first competitive match at a local level, in the Southern Counties Charity Cup the same season, also ended in disaster. Although the club beat Annan Our Boys in the first round 3–2 in front of a "fairly large gate", Our Boys protested at the inclusion of one M'George, on the basis that he had already played for the 5th Kirkcudbrightshire Rifle Volunteers F.C. in the Scottish Cup; the protest was upheld and Dumfries excluded.

The following season the club had evidently improved; although it lost to Moffat in the Southern Counties Charity Cup, it was only by the remarkable score of 7–5, and in the first round of the Scottish Cup the club hammered Newton Stewart Athletic F.C. 9–0, only to lose 6–5 in the second at Dumfries Wanderers.

It was the club's last appearance in the main rounds of the competition as the club was forced into the qualifying rounds. In 1891 the club merged with the local St John's club, and played under the name Dumfries St John's for two seasons. The club entered the Scottish Cup in 1892–93 for the last time, but scratched from its tie with Moffat; it also withdrew from the Southern Counties Cup without playing its tie with Kirkton Rangers. The last reported fixture for the club was a defeat at Moffat in November 1892.

== Colours ==
The club's colours were black and white vertically striped shirts with "dark" (navy serge) knickers. For its final season as Dumfries St John's, the club changed the shirts to maroon.

== Ground ==
The club played at the Recreation Grounds, until moving to Milldomhead in 1892.
