= Cameronians F.C. =

Military-based association football club in Scotland

Cameronians
- Full name: Cameronians Football Club
- Nickname(s): the Cams, the Sodgers
- Founded: 1893
- Dissolved: 1914 (as a senior club)
- Ground: Maxwell Park
- Hon. Secretary: Alex. Mackay
- Match secretary: John McDonald
Home colours

The Cameronians Football Club was an association football club, formed out of the Cameronians (Scottish Rifles) regiment of the British Army.

== History ==
The regiment's side emerged from the 4th Volunteer Battalion of the Scottish Rifles, and was formally called as the 4th V.B.S.R. as a result, the Cameronians name being official from 1897.

The club was founded in 1893 and, with the regiment being based in north-east Glasgow, entered the Scottish Cup, Glasgow Cup and Glasgow North Eastern Cup (the last edition of the latter) in the 1893–94 season. The club beat Shettleston Swifts 7–1 in the first preliminary round of the national competition (the tie being drawn to be played at Shettleston, but actually played at Maxwell Park), but lost in the second to Cowlairs.

The club continued to enter the Glasgow Cup and the Scottish Cup - from 1895 to 1896, the Scottish Qualifying Cup - until 1902–03. It lost every single competitive cup fixture it played, other than a win over Glengowan in the first round of the Qualifying Cup in 1898–99, and a 3–2 replay win over the fallen giants of Renton in the same competition in 1900–01, with goals from Hill, McKnight, and Denholm. The score slightly flattered Renton, which scored its second on the whistle.

Despite the poor cup record, the club applied to join the Scottish Football Alliance in 1896, and was accepted, ahead of Mossend Swifts and Bathgate; albeit this was a sign of the Alliance's decline, as many of its clubs had been recruited into the Scottish League, and it was only by a margin of 6 votes to 3 that the Alliance was not disbanded. Cameronians finished bottom of the 5 clubs, with only one win, 4–1 at home to Blantyre, and the Alliance did not continue afterwards.

From 1904 to 1912, the regiment was stationed outside the United Kingdom, and it had considerable success in competitions; from 1906 to 1909, it won four trophies in India (including the Durand Cup twice), and, having been re-deployed to South Africa in 1910, it won the Orange Free State Cup, the Orange Free State 2nd division, and the Dewar Trophy.

In 1912, the regiment returned to Scotland, and re-entered the Qualifying Cup, but again with the same lack of success; its one win in the competition was 3–2 at Babcock & Wilcox in 1913–14. However, the club did achieve its greatest success in Scottish football that season, by winning the Scottish Amateur Cup, beating the Albert Road Former Pupils at Hampden Park. The outbreak of the First World War meant this was the club's last competitive match; it had to withdraw from the 1914–15 Qualifying Cup and never returned to senior football.

== Colours ==
The club's original colours were red and white jerseys with blue knickers. From 1900 to 1904, the club wore maroon, and while stationed in India reverted to red and white stripes, but with white shorts. From 1912 to 1915, a combination of black, green, and blue, the colours of the regimental tartan.

== Ground ==
The club's ground in Scotland was Maxwell Park off Alexandra Parade.
