= Dumfries Hibernians F.C. =

Former association football club in Scotland

Dumfries Hibernians Football Club
- Full name: Dumfries Hibernians
- Founded: 1897
- Dissolved: 1901
- Ground: Castledykes Park
Home colours

Dumfries Hibernians Football Club, also referred to as Dumfries Hibernian, was a short-lived football team based in Dumfries, Scotland.

== History ==
The club was founded in 1897 as a footballing side aimed at the Irish community in Dumfries, and immediately entered the Scottish Cup, plus was brought into the Southern Counties League as a replacement for Thornhill, who withdrew before the season started. It had early patronage from two local Members of Parliament, Sir Mark MacTaggart-Stewart and Robert Yerburgh, as well as Lord Herries, the Lord Lieutenant of Kirkcudbright.

The club's first match was a 5–5 draw against the 1st Argyll & Sutherland Highlanders in September 1897, and its first competitive match was a 7–2 win over Newton Stewart Athletic in the first round of the Scottish Qualifying Cup in 1897–98. Its first Cup entry was its most successful; by reaching the fourth round of the Qualifying Cup, the club qualified for the first round proper of the Cup itself. In the first round, the club was drawn at home to St Mirren and took an early lead "before their opponents settled down", but went in at half-time 2–1 down, and by the time the Hibernians scored a late consolation goal, St Mirren had scored seven.

The League season had not been so successful, the competition itself petering out with many fixtures unplayed, the Hibernians only having won one of their six matches. The Hibernians however had more success in the local cup competitions; it was twice a finalist in the Dumfries & Galloway Cup, once a finalist in the Southern Counties Cup, and won the Southern Counties Consolation Cup in 1898, beating Douglas Wanderers 2–1 in the final. The club's biggest success was lifting the prestigious invitational Southern Counties Charity Cup at the end of its first season, beating Dumfries 2–1.

The club entered the Scottish Cup for the next three seasons, but lost in its first match every time, the nadir being an 11–2 defeat at Dumfries in 1900–01. It was the club's final entry into the Scottish Cup; the final reported match was a 4–2 defeat by the same team in the final of the Dumfries and Galloway Cup at the end of the season, in a "mediocre" game.

== Colours ==
The club played in green shirts and white shorts.

== Ground ==
The club originally played at Castledykes Park. the club's third XI being called the Castledykes XI. By 1898 the club was playing at least some matches at Palmerston Park, including hosting a visit from Celtic.

In 1899 the club was playing at Cresswell Park and from 1900 at Eastfield Park.

== Notable players ==
- William Miller, who scored the consolation goal against St Mirren in the 1897 Cup tie, and who later played for St Bernard's F.C. and Grimsby Town
