= Early league football in Dumfries and Galloway =

Before the South of Scotland Football League was formed in 1946, there had been previous attempts to introduce league competitions in the Dumfries and Galloway region of Scotland since the 1890s. These early attempts invariably foundered because of the very small townships in the area and a tendency for the clubs to concentrate on the myriad of cup competitions that were in operation.

The various leagues are detailed below.

== South of Scotland League ==
This league ran in 1892–93. The member clubs were: 5th Kirkcudbrightshire Rifle Volunteers, Queen of the South Wanderers, Mauchline, Cronberry Eglinton, Lugar Boswell, Springbank and Lanemark. The competition was abandoned without being completed.

== Stewartry Football League ==
A Kirkcudbrightshire based league, this competition was formed in 1894–95 by St Cuthbert Wanderers, Barholm Rovers, 6th Galloway Rifle Volunteers, Vale of Fleet and Douglas Wanderers. The first season's competition was once again unfinished.

In 1895–96 St Cuthbert Wanderers, Douglas Wanderers and Barholm Rovers were the sole entrants and finished in that order.

The league's last season, 1896–97, saw Barholm Rovers replaced by the returning 6th Galloway Rifle Volunteers, who duly won the St Cuthbert's Cup.

== Kirkcudbrightshire Football League ==
In 1920–21 this competition is known to have included St Cuthbert Wanderers, Dalbeattie Star, Creetown and Douglas Wanderers.

In 1921, it was renamed the Stewartry Football League, with Vale of Fleet replacing Dalbeattie Star.

== Southern Counties Football League ==
Clubs known to have competed in this league are as follows:

- 1897–98: Newton Stewart Athletic, Dumfries, Nithsdale, Douglas Wanderers, St Cuthbert Wanderers, Dumfries Hibernians, Border and 6th Galloway Rifle Volunteers. Moffat, Thornhill and Vale Of Dryfe all resigned.
- 1910–11: Douglas Wanderers, 5th King's Own Scottish Borderers, Dalbeattie Star, St Cuthbert Wanderers, Mid-Annandale and Dumfries Amateurs.
- 1914–15: 5th King's Own Scottish Borderers, St Cuthbert Wanderers, Solway Star, Thornhill, Dumfries, Dumfries Amateurs, Mid-Annandale and Dalbeattie Star.
- 1921–22: Mid-Annandale, Solway Star, St Cuthbert Wanderers, Thornhill, Dalbeattie Star and Queen of the South 'A'.
- 1922–23: Mid-Annandale, St Cuthbert Wanderers, Thornhill and Dalbeattie Star.
- 1924–25: Dalbeattie Star, St Cuthbert Wanderers, Stranraer, Newton Stewart and Douglas Wanderers.

== Champions 1892–93 to 1924–25 ==
Season	League	Champions
1892–93	SoS	unfinished
1894–95	Stew	unfinished
1895–96	Stew	St Cuthbert Wanderers
1896–97	Stew	6th Galloway Rifle Volunteers
1897–98	SCos	unfinished
1910–11	SCos	unfinished
1913–14	Wig	unfinished
1914–15	SCos	unfinished
1920–21	Kirk	St Cuthbert Wanderers
1921–22	Stew	unfinished
1921–22	SCos	unfinished
1922–23	SCos	Mid-Annandale
1923–24	Wig	unfinished
1924–25	Wig	unfinished
1924–25	SCos	Dalbeattie Star

Key: SoS - South of Scotland League, Stew - Stewartry League, SCos - Southern Counties League, Wig - Wigtownshire League, Kirk - Kirkcudbrightshire League

== Southern Counties League (2nd incarnation) ==
In 1927, the Southern Counties Football League was re-formed.

=== Member clubs ===
- Creetown
- Dalbeattie Star
- Douglas Wanderers
- Garlieston
- Mid-Annandale
- Newton Stewart
- Nithsdale Wanderers
- Queen of the South
- St Cuthbert Wanderers
- Solway Star
- Stranraer
- Stranraer 'A'
- Tarff Rovers
- Thornhill
- Whithorn
- Wigtown & Bladnoch

=== Champions ===
Season	Champions
1927–28	unfinished
1928–29	St Cuthbert Wanderers
1929–30	Dalbeattie Star
1930–31	Dalbeattie Star
1931–32	Dalbeattie Star
1932–33	Dalbeattie Star
1933–34	Dalbeattie Star
1934–35	St Cuthbert Wanderers
1935–36	unfinished
1936–37	unfinished
