= South of Scotland Cup =

- Founded: 1927
- Abolished: 1931
- Region: Dumfries and Galloway
- Number of teams: 15
- Most successful club(s): Dalbeattie Star (2 wins)

The South of Scotland Cup was an association football cup competition for clubs in the historic counties of Dumfriesshire, Wigtownshire, and Kirkcudbrightshire, Scotland.

== History ==
The competition was a knock-out tournament and had its origins in the Southern Counties Cup consolation tournament; given the few clubs in the area, in 1927 it was decided to use the trophy as a second competitive cup, allowing the Southern Counties Cup finalists to take part as well.

The competition was not a success, despite having four clubs who were or would be members of the Scottish League. It only lasting until 1931, and the first competition did not even play to a conclusion. Even Dalbeattie Star's 5–0 win in the 1930 final did not attract much in the way of media attention.

An attempt to revive the competition in 1937 as a replacement for the Southern Counties League was unsuccessful.

== Entrants ==
- Creetown
- Dalbeattie Star
- Douglas Wanderers
- Garlieston
- Mid-Annandale
- Newton Stewart
- Nithsdale Wanderers
- Queen of the South "A"
- Solway Star
- St Cuthbert's Wanderers
- Stranraer
- Tarff Rovers
- Thornhill
- Whithorn
- Wigtown & Bladnoch

== Finals ==
Year	Winner	Score	Runner-up
1928–29	Mid-Annandale	?	?
1929–30	Dalbeattie Star	5–0	Newton Stewart
1930–31	Dalbeattie Star	?	St Cuthbert's Wanderers
