= Southern Counties League (Scotland) =

- Founded: 1921
- Abolished: 1937
- Region: Scotland
- Most championships: Dalbeattie Star (6 titles)

The Southern Counties League was a league association football tournament for teams in southern Scotland.

== History ==
Clubs in the Southern Counties Football Association, based in the south and west of Scotland, tried several times to form a league competition. The most successful of these initial attempts was 1897–98, under the presidency of W. T. Hay of Dumfries, which had seven clubs, and which played long enough to declare a champion in Newton Stewart, which earned 11 points from its 6 games; the only club which came close to playing all its fixtures was Nithsdale, which played 11 times. The organizational shambles however was such that Vale of Dryfe withdrew before the season kicked off, Thornhill before playing a match (replaced by Dumfries Hibernians), and the 6th G.R.V. quit after it had four matches postponed at late notice because of clashing cup commitments. One attempt to raise funds - a match between a Counties side and a Glasgow Football Association side at Cresswell Park in Dumfries - only raised £16 and the visitors had an easy 9–3 win.

After abortive seasons in 1910–11 and 1914–15, was properly established in 1921–22 and, apart from two seasons, ran almost until the Second World War.

The League never had more than 11 members, which it achieved in 1931–32, and even then Nithsdale Wanderers only played four fixtures before withdrawing. St Cuthbert's Wanderers was the only club to enter every season.

The League was formally abandoned in July 1937, as the Southern Counties FA voted instead to reintroduce the South of Scotland Cup on a home-and-away principle.

An attempt to re-start the League after the Second World War was thwarted by a protest from Wigtown & Bladnoch, on the basis that the new membership had excluded Wigtownshire clubs in favour of two Ayrshire sides (the "A" sides of Ayr United and Kilmarnock), so the members formed a new competition instead, called the South of Scotland League.

== Member clubs ==
| Team | Seasons | First season | Last season |
|---|---|---|---|
| Creetown | 6 | 1927–28 | 1936–37 |
| Dalbeattie Star | 9 | 1922–23 | 1933–34 |
| Douglas Wanderers | 7 | 1924–25 | 1934–35 |
| Garlieston | 6 | 1928–29 | 1936–37 |
| Mid-Annandale | 4 | 1922–23 | 1932–33 |
| Newton Stewart Athletic | 9 | 1924–27 | 1936–37 |
| Nithsdale Wanderers | 3 | 1930–31 | 1932–33 |
| Queen of the South "A" | 3 | 1930–31 | 1932–33 |
| St Cuthbert's Wanderers | 12 | 1922–23 | 1936–37 |
| Solway Star | 4 | 1928–29 | 1932–33 |
| Stranraer "A" | 9 | 1924–25 | 1936–37 |
| Tarff Rovers | 7 | 1928–29 | 1936–37 |
| Thornhill | 2 | 1922–23 | 1930–31 |
| Whithorn | 5 | 1932–33 | 1936–37 |
| Wigtown & Bladnoch | 7 | 1930–31 | 1936–37 |

== Champions ==
- 1921–22: Mid-Annandale
- 1922–23: Mid-Annandale (2)
- 1924–25: Dalbeattie Star
- 1928–29: St Cuthbert's Wanderers
- 1929–30: Dalbeattie Star (2)
- 1930–31: Dalbeattie Star (3)
- 1931–32: Dalbeattie Star (4)
- 1932–33: Dalbeattie Star (5)
- 1933–34: Dalbeattie Star (6)
- 1934–35: St Cuthbert's Wanderers (2)
- 1935–36: St Cuthbert's Wanderers (3)
- 1936–37: St Cuthbert's Wanderers (4)

== See also ==
- Scottish Football (Defunct Leagues)
