= Wigtownshire Cup =

- Founded: 1889
- Abolished: 1968
- Region: Wigtownshire
- Most successful club(s): Newton Stewart (16 wins)

The Wigtownshire Cup was an association football cup competition, originally for clubs in the historic county of Wigtownshire, Scotland, although from the 1900s clubs from Kirkcudbrightshire were allowed to enter. The competition ran intermittently from 1889 to 1968.

== Format ==
The competition was a knock-out tournament contested by senior clubs in Wigtownshire. The final in 1945–46 uniquely was held over two legs; Newton Stewart beat St Cuthbert's Wanderers 4–2 at home, but the Saints won 3–1 in the reverse fixture - a last-minute Drysdale goal for Newton Stewart forced the tie into a play-off. A hat-trick from Clark in the replay at Wigtown gave the Saints their last triumph in the trophy.

== Finals (incomplete) ==
Year	Winner	Score	Runner-up
1889–90	Newton Stewart Athletic	5–1	Wigtown
1890–91	Tarff Rovers		Garliestown
1891–92	Newton Stewart Athletic	4–0	Stranraer
1892–93	Garliestown		?
1893–94	Garliestown	1–0	Newton Stewart Athletic
1894–95	Garliestown	8–5	Kirkcowan
1895–96	Newton Stewart Athletic	4–0	Tarff Rovers
1896–97	Newton Stewart Athletic	5–2	Glenarnott Athletic
1897–98	Newton Stewart Athletic	2–1	Stranraer
1898–99	Stranraer	?	Tarff Rovers
1899–1900	Newton Stewart Athletic	6–2	Stranraer
1900–01	Stranraer	3–2	Tarff Rovers
1901–02	Tarff Rovers	3–1	Stranraer
1902–03	Newton Stewart	5–0	Wigtown
1903–04	Newton Stewart	8–1	Wigtown
1904–05	Stranraer	2–2, 3–2	Tarff Rovers
1905–06	Stranraer	5–3 (aet)	Whithorn
1906–07	Newton Stewart	1–1, 1–1, ?–?	Whithorn
1907–08	Whithorn	2–1	Garlieston
1908–09	Newton Stewart	2–1	Tarff Rovers
1909–10	Stranraer	1–0	St Cuthbert's Wanderers
1910–11	Stranraer	4–1	Whithorn
1911–12	Newton Stewart	3–1	Whithorn
1912–13	Whithorn	1–1, 2–1	Tarff Rovers
1913–14	Newton Stewart	0–0, 1–0	Garlieston
1919–20	Stranraer	2–0	Whithorn
1920–21	Stranraer	4–0	Newton Stewart
1921–22	Newton Stewart	3–2	Stranraer
1922–23	Tarff Rovers	0–0, ?–?	Wigtown & Bladnoch
1923–24	Stranraer	3–1	Creetown
1924–25	Wigtown & Bladnoch	?–?	Newton Stewart
1925–26	Newton Stewart	3–2	Stranraer
1926–27	Stranraer	2–2, 2–2, 4–1	Creetown
1927–28	Stranraer	5–2	Creetown
1929–30	Garlieston	?–?	Newton Stewart
1930–31	Wigtown & Bladnoch	4–0	Creetown
1932–33	Wigtown & Bladnoch	?–?	?
1933–34	Wigtown & Bladnoch	4–0	Newton Stewart
1934–35	Creetown	?–?	?
1935–36	Creetown	?–?	?
1936–37	St Cuthbert's Wanderers	?–?	?
1937–38	St Cuthbert's Wanderers	?–?	?
1938–39	RAF West Freugh	7–2	St Cuthbert's Wanderers
1945–46	St Cuthbert's Wanderers	5–5 (agg), 3–1	Newton Stewart
1947–48	Stranraer	?–?	?
1948–49	Wigtown & Bladnoch	?–?	?
1950–51	Newton Stewart	3–2	Tarff Rovers
1954–55	Whithorn	?–?	?
1959–60	Threave Rovers	?–?	?
1960–61	Stranraer	?–?	?
1962–63	Tarff Rovers	?–?	?
1964–65	Threave Rovers	?–?	?
1967–68	Newton Stewart	3–0	Stranraer

=== Wins by club ===
Team	Wins	First win	Last win
Creetown	2	1934–35	1935–36
Garlieston (1926–39)	1	1929–30	–
Garliestown (1878–1914)	3	1892–93	1894–95
Newton Stewart (Athletic)	16	1889–90	1967–68
RAF West Freugh	1	1938–39	–
St Cuthbert's Wanderers	2	1936–37	1945–46
Stranraer	13	1898–99	1960–61
Tarff Rovers	4	1890–91	1962–63
Threave Rovers	2	1959–60	1964–65
Whithorn	3	1907–08	1954–55
Wigtown & Bladnoch	5	1924–25	1948–49
