= Garliestown F.C. =

Former association football club in Scotland

Garliestown
- Full name: Garliestown Football Club
- Nickname(s): the Sea Porters
- Founded: 1878
- Dissolved: 1914
- Ground: Galloway House Park
- President: Major Johnstone
- Match Secretary: James Dally, R. A. Allan
Home colours

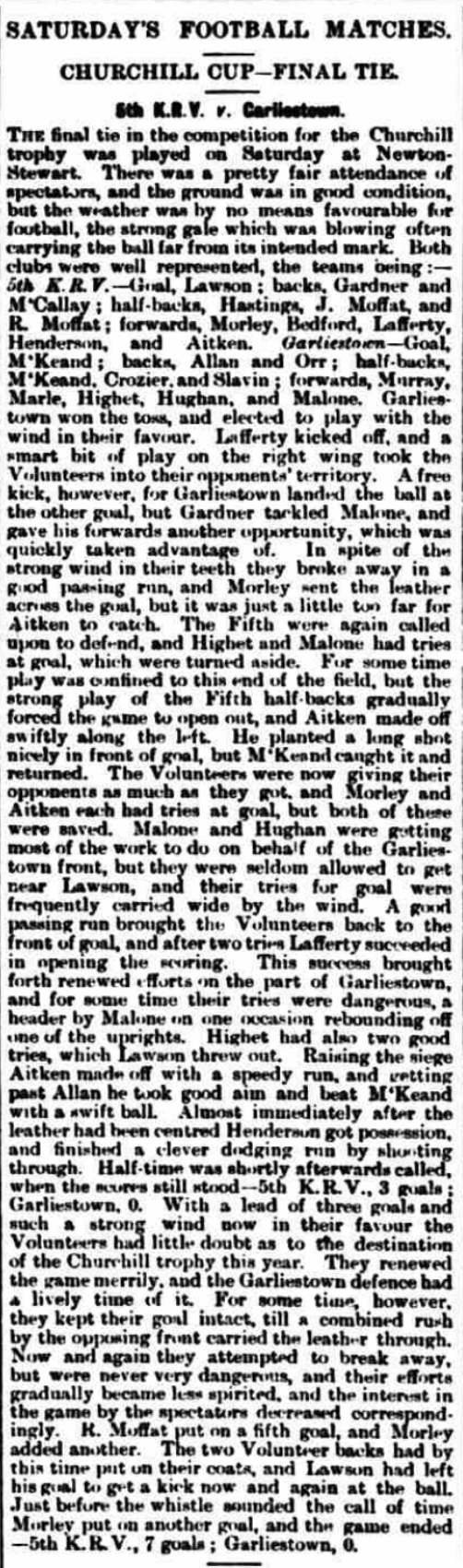
1893–94 Churchill Cup final, 5th K.R.V. 7–0 Garliestown, Dumfries & Galloway Courier, 14 February 1894

Garliestown Football Club was an association football club from the village of Garlieston, Wigtownshire.

== History ==
The club claimed a foundation date of 1878, although it had a fitful existence for its first few years, being an irregular entrant to the Churchill Cup from 1881 and twice entering the Southern Counties Cup, in the competition's first season of 1891–92 and again in 1895–96, but scratching both times. The club's name was generally rendered as Garliestown until at least 1906, the Garlieston spelling becoming more common from 1907.

The club was one of the most successful in its county, winning the Wigtownshire Cup three consecutive seasons (1892–93 to 1894–95), the final time with a remarkable 8–5 win over Kirkcowan in the final at Stranraer. The club also won two of the first four editions of the Newton Stewart Cup (1891–92 and 1893–94), exchanging titles with the Newton Stewart club, although, as the club was not yet a member of the Scottish Football Association, it was entitled to play a 'ringer' (Willie Crozier, formerly of Sunderland Albion) without threat of punishment for playing an illegal professional.

It was also a regular entrant to the Law Cup, for clubs in the two counties of Wigtownshire and Kirkcudbrightshire, reaching the final for the only time in 1895–96, but losing 3–2 away at Douglas Wanderers, all of the goals coming in the first half.

However, on a wider stage it was almost entirely without success, its first two wins in the Churchill Cup (which included clubs from Dumfriesshire) coming in 1893–94 against St Cuthbert's Wanderers and Newton Stewart. The club also received a bye to be put into the final against the 5th K.R.V., which beat Garliestown 7–0, despite the 5th having a much longer journey to Newton Stewart for the final. This small success gained the club an invitation to play in the Southern Counties Charity Cup for the only time, but it lost 6–0 at Newton Stewart in its only tie.

Garliestown was also an irregular entrant to the Scottish Qualifying Cup between 1895 and 1905, taking part in the competition four times. Its first appearance in 1895–96 was a 3–2 defeat to a Newtown Stewart side filled with reserves and, after scratching from its next two entries, re-formed itself in the early 1900s with patronage from the Earl of Galloway and the local Member of Parliament, Sir H. E. Maxwell. Its third entry, in 1905–06, saw the club beat Tarff Rovers 4–3 in a replay, coming from 2–1 down at half-time, for its only win in the competition. In the second round it lost 11–1 at 6th G.R.V., the Garliestown goal being a penalty from Edgar when already four behind.

The club's last appearance of any note was in the final of the 1913–14 Wigtownshire Cup, by which time the competition had been reduced to four clubs, and Garlieston walked over in the semi-final after illness reduced the Tarff Rovers squad. In the final, Garlieston lost 1–0 in a replay to Newton Stewart. The club did not re-emerge after the First World War and a new Garlieston club was founded in 1926.

== Colours ==
The club originally wore royal blue jerseys. For the 1904–05 season, it described its colours as blue and white, and afterwards as black and white.

== Ground ==
The club originally played at Galloway House Park. The club tried to move to a new park in 1902, a 3-minute walk from the town centre and surrounded by trees, but was frequently forced to revert to Galloway House (owned by the club's president Major Johnstone) because the new pitch was often under water.

== Honours ==
- Churchill Cup
  - Runner-up: 1893–94
- Law Cup
  - Runner-up: 1895–96
- Wigtownshire Cup
  - Winner: 1892–93, 1893–94, 1894–95, 1907–08
  - Runner-up: 1890–91, 1913–14
- Newtown-Stewart Cup
  - Winner: 1891–92, 1893–94
  - Runner-up: 1890–91, 1892–93, 1894–95, 1895–96
