= List of defunct football leagues in Scotland =

After the formation of the Scottish Football League in 1890, a number of senior football clubs set up various non-league competitions around the country. A number of these leagues were supplementary football leagues, that is they were played by clubs from various other competitions in order to create a fuller, competitive fixture list.

== Senior ==
- Scottish Football League
  - Premier Division
  - First Division
  - Second Division
  - Third Division
- Scottish Premier League

=== Non League ===
- Central League
- Central Combination
- Midland League
- Northern League
- Scottish Alliance
- Scottish Combination
- Scottish Federation
- Scottish Union

== Junior ==
- Ayrshire Junior League
- Central Junior League
- East Junior League
- Fife Junior League
- Glasgow Junior League
- Lanarkshire Junior League
- North Junior League
- Scottish Intermediate League
- Scottish Junior League

== Amateur ==
- Dumfries & District Amateur League
- West of Scotland Amateur League

== War-time ==
- North Eastern League
- Southern League
- War Emergency League

== Supplementary ==
- Ayrshire & Renfrewshire League
- Edinburgh / East of Scotland League
- Glasgow League
- Glasgow & West of Scotland League
- Inter City League
- Inter City Midweek League
- Inter County League
- Lanarkshire League
- Renfrewshire League
- Scottish County League

== Age group ==
=== Reserve ===
- Combined Reserve League
- Scottish Premier Reserve League
- Scottish Reserve Football League

=== Youth ===
- SPFL Development League

== Regional senior ==
- Ayrshire Combination
- Ayrshire League
- Eastern League
- Kirkcudbrightshire League
- Southern Counties League
- Stewartry League
- Western League
