= Bannockburn =

Area of Stirling, Scotland

Coordinates: 56.09°N 3.91°W

Bannockburn: Scottish Gaelic: Allt a' Bhonnaich
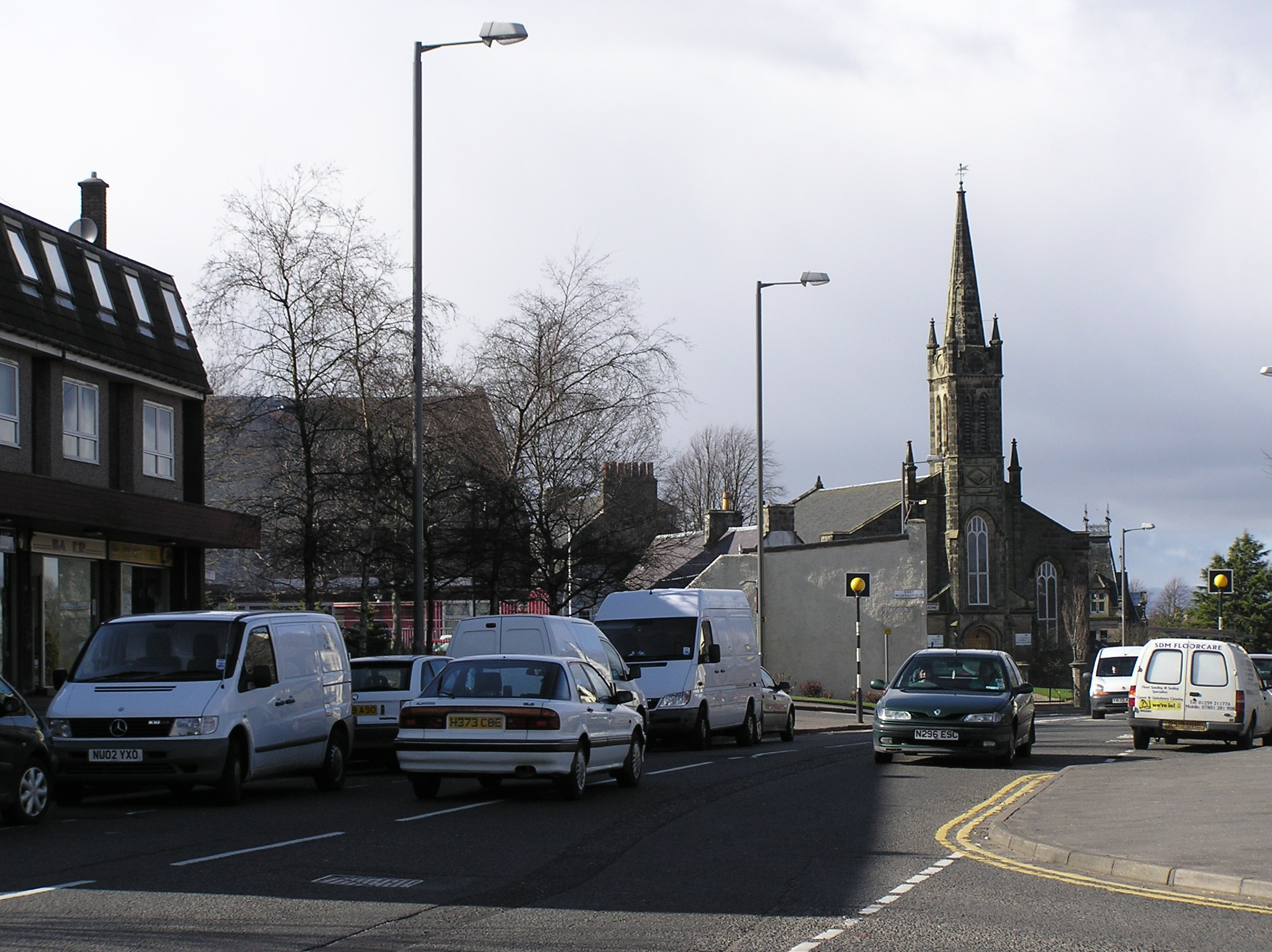
- The centre of Bannockburn

- Location within the Stirling council area
- Population: 6,720 (2020)
- OS grid reference: NS811902
  - Edinburgh: 35 mi (56 km) ESE
  - London: 410 mi (660 km) SSE
- Council area: Stirling
- Lieutenancy area: Stirling and Falkirk
- Country: Scotland
- Sovereign state: United Kingdom
- Post town: STIRLING
- Postcode district: FK7
- Dialling code: 01786
- Police: Scotland
- Fire: Scottish
- Ambulance: Scottish
- UK Parliament: Stirling and Strathallan
- Scottish Parliament: Stirling
- Website: www.bannockburn.co.uk

Bannockburn (Scottish Gaelic: Allt a' Bhonnaich) is an area immediately south of the centre of Stirling in Scotland. It is part of the City of Stirling. It is named after the Bannock Burn, a stream running through the town before flowing into the River Forth.

== History ==
Land in the vicinity of Bannockburn town, probably between the Pelstream and Bannock burns (hence Bannockburn), was the site of the Battle of Bannockburn fought in 1314—one of the pivotal battles of the 13th/14th century Wars of Independence between the kingdoms of Scotland and England. A large monument and visitor centre is located near the site of the battle. In previous generations tourists came to visit the site and look at the Borestone. The dignity of the barony of Bannockburn is currently held by Hope Vere Anderson, a descendant of the Sandilands and Vere families of Sandilands and Lesmahagow, Lanarkshire who were the original Barons of Bannockburn in the 14th century. In the year of 1746, after the Battle of Culloden, Bonnie Prince Charlie stayed in Bannockburn House where he met the future mother of his child.

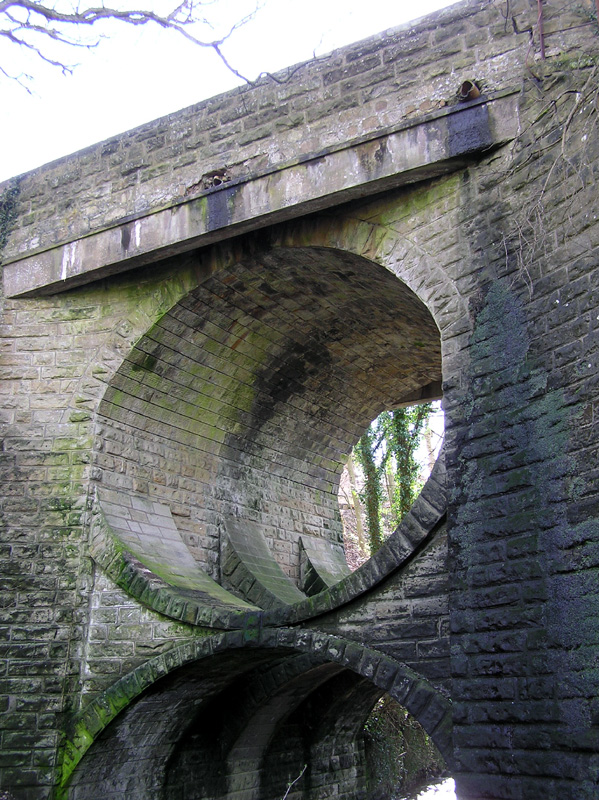
Telford's circular-arch roadbridge over the Bannock Burn

Bannockburn village used to be famous for its carpet and tweed factories and woollen mills. In the late 18th and early 19th centuries the Wilson family of Bannockburn designed and wove tartans for the British Army. Many of the so-called Clan tartans were created by the Wilsons in response to the needs of the Clan chiefs who, without their own authentic tartans, approached the Wilsons for suitable patterns. The visit of King George IV to Edinburgh in 1822, and his insistence that the Clan chiefs attend his banquets and levees in their Clan tartans, prompted this reaction. The woollen mills employed 7-800 people around 1880. The last mill closed in 1924.

The turnpike road between Edinburgh and Stirling was constructed in the 1750s and passed through Bannockburn. The route originally passed over the Old Bridge, until the construction in 1819 of a circular-arch stone bridge, built by engineer Thomas Telford, spanning the burn downstream of the battle site. Growth of both Stirling and Bannockburn during the 19th and 20th centuries means that the two now form a contiguous conurbation, and Bannockburn was latterly incorporated into the city (then royal burgh) of Stirling. Bannockburn had a population of 7,352 at the time of the 2001 census.

The area contains most necessary amenities, including a library, and local shops. It is served by Bannockburn Primary School, in the centre of the community, and Bannockburn High School in nearby Broomridge. Several new private housing schemes have been built in and around Bannockburn since the 1990s, increasing pressure on the already overcrowded high school. As a result of this, in 2007 and 2008 Bannockburn High School was extended to provide additional capacity.

Between 1852 and 1949 Bannockburn had a railway station on the Scottish Central Railway, located next to the site of the bus depot. Nowadays, however, residents wishing to use the train must travel into the centre of Stirling. Introduction of a new station with a park-and-ride facility was proposed in the Strategic Transport Projects Review in 2009. Bannockburn is served by the 38, 51 and C30 bus services.

== Sports ==
Bannockburn and Hillpark have two amateur football teams, Bannockburn Amateurs (Est. 1968) and Milton FC (Est. 1972). Bannockburn Amateurs won the West of Scotland Amateur Cup for the fifth time in 2019.

Bannockburn also hosts its own Rugby Club. Formerly known as St Modans HSFP RFC (Est. 1978), it changed its name to Bannockburn RFC in 1996. Bannockburn currently plays in the Scottish Hydro Electric Regional League: Caledonia Division 2 Midlands.

Bannockburn also plays host to St Modans HSFP Cricket Club, who play in the Strathmore and Perthshire Cricket Union Division 1. In July 2013, playing against Perth Doo'cot CC, St Modans scored 329 runs in response to Perth's 326, making it what is believed to be the highest scoring game ever recorded in the SPCU.

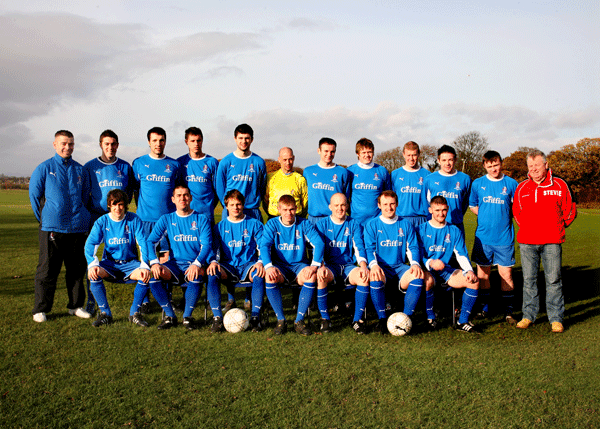
2009 Milton FC Team

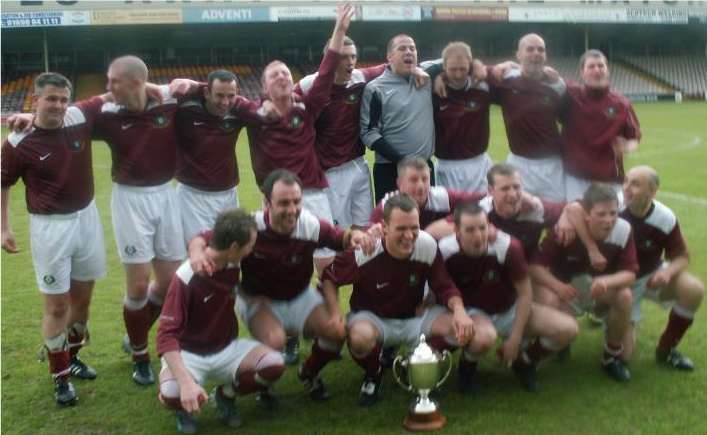
Bannockburn Amateurs West of Scotland Cup Winners 2009

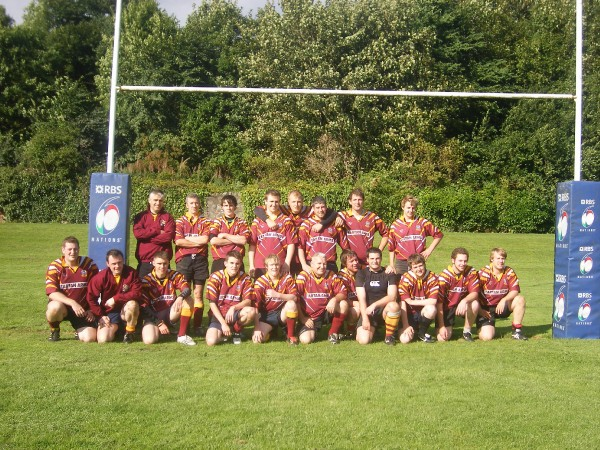
Bannockburn RFC

== Places of worship ==
- Murrayfield United Free Church Of Scotland
- Our Lady and St Ninian's R.C. Church

The town also has a Gospel Hall and two Church of Scotland churches. Christadelphians meet in a hall on Main Street. The hall used to be a carpet factory.

== Notes and references ==
Historic Environment Scotland
