= Supplementary football league =

A supplementary football league is an association football competition set up by clubs which are already members of more senior leagues to give the clubs a larger fixture list and fill in "spare" Saturdays which were not being used for cup-ties or league games.

== In England ==
The United League existed as a supplementary league in London and the south-east of England between 1896 and 1902 and again from 1905 until 1909.

== In Scotland ==
A number of supplementary leagues were created in the early days of organised football in Scotland by Scottish Football League clubs as, with only 10 member clubs each playing just 18 games per season, there were plenty of spare Saturdays to fill. The gradual expansion of the Scottish League after 1900 eventually killed these off.

- Edinburgh / East of Scotland League
- Glasgow League
- Glasgow & District Midweek League
- Glasgow & West of Scotland League
- Inter City League
- Inter City Midweek League
- Inter County League
- Lanarkshire League
- Renfrewshire League
- Scottish County League

== See also ==
- List of defunct leagues in Scotland
