= Scottish County Football League =

Scottish County League
- Founded: 1899
- Abolished: 1900
- Region: Scotland
- Number of teams: 6
- Last champions: Ayr FC (1st title)
- Most successful club(s): Ayr FC (1 title)

The Scottish County Football League was one of several supplementary football leagues that were created in the early days of competitive football in Scotland in order to increase the number of fixtures for Scottish Football League clubs.

The only season in which the competition took place is in 1899–1900, and the member clubs included Abercorn, Ayr the Champions, Raith Rovers, Hamilton Academical, Motherwell and East Stirlingshire.

Two fixtures were held over until 1900–01 and both doubled up as Scottish League fixtures.

== See also ==
- Defunct leagues in Scottish football
