= Vale o' Nith F.C. =

Former association football club in Scotland

Vale o' Nith Football Club
- Full name: Vale o' Nith
- Nicknames: the Vale, the Zebras
- Founded: 1880
- Dissolved: 1889
- Ground: Vale Park
- Hon. Secretary: Alexander Kinghorn
Home colours

Vale o' Nith Football Club was an association football club from Dumfries, Scotland.

== History ==
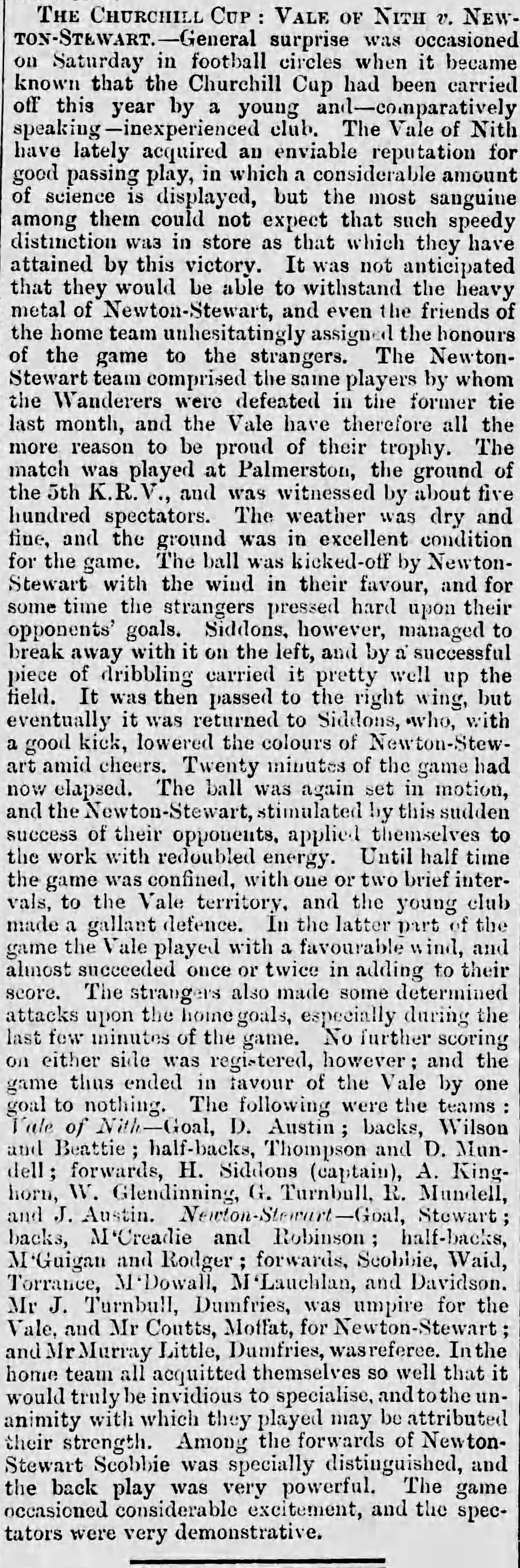
The Vale's finest moment - winning the 1882–83 Churchill Cup

The club was founded in 1880 by "very young and enthusiastic" players. Although the club's name was sometimes given as Vale of Nith, it was officially registered as Vale o' Nith.

It was a founder member of the Southern Counties Association in 1881; the association obtained a trophy from the Rev. W. H. Churchill of Moffat for a competition, and Vale o' Nith played in the Churchill Cup from its first edition in 1881–82 until 1888–89.

The Vale won through to the second round in its first entry, losing 6–0 to the strongest side in the area in the second round, Queen of the South Wanderers.

=== Churchill Cup success ===
Although the club had some prominence as one of the few senior clubs in the southern counties, and proved more resilient than most, it was a frequent victim of "the drafting system" in losing players to the bigger sides. Between 1883 and 1885, its membership went down from 80 to 70, despite taking over the East End Rovers, while the membership of QoS Wanderers went up from 81 to over 120 and the 5th K.R.V. rose by a similar amount.

Nevertheless, "much to their own surprise", the club was the second winner of the Churchill Cup, in 1882–83, the key match being an unexpected 6–1 drubbing of Moffat in the second round. The final, against Newton Stewart, was almost a home match, being played at the 5th K.R.V.'s Palmerston Park, and a large number of supporters from other teams came out to support the underdogs - the support being so boisterous as to lead to an unsuccessful protest from the losers.

Perhaps as a consequence of this success, the club and joined the Scottish Football Association in August 1883, and entered the 1883–84 Scottish Cup, its first time in the national competition. Moffat gained a revenge by winning the first round tie 4–2, and added to that revenge by ending the Vale's defence of the Churchill Cup in the second round.

East End Rovers
- Nickname: the Rovers
- Founded: 1882
- Dissolved: 1883
- Ground: Caledonia Park
- Match Secretary: J. G. Thomson
Home colours

=== East End Rovers ===
Somewhat unexpectedly, the club had a second chance in the Scottish Cup. In the pre-season to 1883–84, it had taken over fellow Dumfries side East End Rovers. The Rovers had been founded in 1882 and originally played at Caledonia Park. In its first half-season, over the first half of 1882, the Rovers played 3 matches, losing them all.

The Rovers entered the 1882–83 Scottish Cup but was hammered 9–0 at Moffat. It also lost its only tie in the Churchill Cup, in the same season, 2–1 at home to Mid-Annandale. The club at least finished the season on a positive note, being runners-up to the 5th K.R.V. in a five-a-side tournament at Palmerston, the players earning themselves a pair of orange and black socks each.

Nevertheless, it had amassed 50 members by 1883 and had also entered the Scottish Cup in 1883–84 before the takeover. The Rovers did not withdraw from the Cup; instead those players who were not Cup-tied took advantage of Newton Stewart scratching to Rovers in the first round to face Drumlanrig Rangers in the round, and a 3–2 away win for the Rovers took them into the third round.

The run ended at Milldamhead against the 5th K.R.V. in "one of the pleasantest that has been played in this district, owing to an entire absence of charging and quarrelling"; the Rovers held out for half-an-hour, and Mulholland scored an equaliser straight after the Volunteers had taken the lead, but ultimately the 5th scored five more without reply.

The Rovers name was briefly retained as the name of the Vale o' Nith reserve side, and the SFA removed it from the roll in 1884.

=== After the takeover ===
Rather than boost the Vale to a new level, the takeover merely delayed the decay, as by 1886 the Vale was still struggling with 70 members, compared to QoS Wanderers' 200, the 5th's 140, and Moffat's 100; even the perennially obliterated Nithsdale still had 50 members.

The 1883–84 season saw the first Southern Counties Charity Cup, and the Vale reached the final. Its unexpected 3–0 semi-final win over the QoS Wanderers was "one of the most exciting games played this season" and full-back Wilson was chaired off the field because of his display. The Vale lost 3–1 to the 5th K.R.V. in the final, the match demonstrating "the finest exhibition of play [Southern Counties chairman Johnson] had seen in the district"; the Vale had the disadvantage of the tie being at Palmerston, the Wanderers having pulled out of hosting duties at the last minute. The Vale's protest against an "objectionable incident" when Duff, in the 5th's goal, struck Haining in the eye, was dismissed.

Unbeknownst to the club, it had already passed its peak. Its only other Southern Counties Charity Cup final came after it did not need to play a match; in the Churchill, it reached the final in 1886–87, but lost 4–3 against Mid-Annandale, two late Vale goals making the result look more respectable.

In the Scottish Cup, which at the time had regionalized early rounds, the club never got beyond the Southern Counties region, twice reaching the third round (in 1884–85 and 1888–89) but lost to the QoS Wanderers both times.

The club's last Cup run saw it get past Thornhill on a walkover. The tie had been abandoned (while the score was 2–2) when the referee walked off, having been "caught by the throat" by a Thornhill player. Thornhill had four players suspended in the aftermath - Marchbanks for 6 months and M'Credie, Graham, and M'Lachlan for 3 - and rather than play a replay, Thornhill withdrew. On 22 September 1888 the club Mid-Annandale 3–1 in the second round, in a typically brutal game with the Mids, who had the temerity to protest about rough play; the appeal found that, as the Vale finished the match with 8 men because of injuries, which included a broken leg to Dickson, that "the club complained of had come off worst" - nevertheless Lavin of the Vale (as well as Mitchell of the Mids) were suspended for a month.

The club collapsed in the aftermath, suffering from the rise of professionalism and poaching of players. In the third round of the Cup, the Vale surrendered to an 11–1 defeat to Queen of the South Wanderers; even worse, in what seems to have been the Vale's last match, exactly 3 months after beating Mid-Annandale in the Scottish Cup, it lost to the Mids in the Churchill Cup by the appalling score of 19–1. That seems to have been the final blow for the club, as at the start of 1889 its ground at Milldamhead Park was being let for grazing.

The Vale was struck from the Scottish FA membership roll in August 1889. the name was revived in the 1893–94 season by a Junior side, which lost in the Southern Counties Junior Cup final to the 5th K.R.V. reserve side at the end of the season.

== Colours ==
The club's colours were 1" black and white hoops. East End Rovers' colours were orange and black hooped jerseys and hose, with white knickers.

== Ground ==
The club originally was forced to use public fields, before securing Vale Park, a three-minute walk from Dumfries railway station, in 1882. In 1883 the club moved to Milldamhead Park, which had originally been the practice ground of the East End Rovers and later the Rovers' home ground; the Rovers' original Caledonia Park ground was a 2-minute walk from Dumfries railway station.

== Honours ==
Churchill Cup

- Winners: 1882–83
- Runners-up: 1886–87

Southern Counties Charity Cup

- Runners-up: 1883–84, 1887–88
