= Garlieston F.C. =

Former association football club in Scotland

Garlieston
- Full name: Garlieston Football Club
- Founded: 1926
- Dissolved: 1939
- Ground: Galloway House Park
Home colours

Garlieston Football Club was an association football club from the village of Garlieston, Wigtownshire.

== History ==
The club was founded in 1926, a decade after the previous club of note in the village, Garliestown, had dissolved. Its first competitive football came in the 1926–27 season, in the Southern Counties Cup, a competition the club entered until the Second World War. Its best run in the competition came in 1928–29, when it reached the semi-final. In the same season, it was a runner-up in the Wigtownshire Cup, albeit in part due to there only being three entrants; it is recorded as having won the 1929–30 tournament but that may have been by default. At the end of that season two of the Garlieston players (Bertie Allen and Jock Kelly) rescued a third (William Murray) from drowning in Garlieston harbour after he got into difficulties while swimming.

Garlieston also played in the Southern Counties League on an occasional basis in the 1920s and 1930s, including every season from 1933–34 until the League's final season in 1936–37, although without any success of note, finishing bottom three times.

Ambitiously, the club joined the Scottish Football Association in 1936, and entered the Scottish Qualifying Cup from 1936–37 until 1939–40. The club drew with Tarff Rovers in its first tie, but lost the replay, and also lost its first ties in its two other appearances. The club gained a temporary boost in March 1937, when Whithorn, which had stopped playing the previous season, threw in its lot with Garlieston.

In 1939–40 the club was drawn to visit Dalbeattie Star in the first round, but the competition was interrupted by the war, and the club faded from existence. The name was revived in 1952 for a new club which only lasted a couple of seasons.

== Colours ==
The club played in blue.

== Ground ==
The club played at the Galloway House Park, as its predecessor club had done.
