= Bannockburn RFC =

Scottish rugby union club, based in Bannockburn

- Full name: Bannockburn Rugby Football Club
- Union: Scottish Rugby Union
- Nickname: The Burn
- Founded: 1978 as St Modans High School FPs
- Region: Stirling
- Ground: Bluebellwood Park
- President: (Scotland) Scott McGown
- Coach: (Scotland) David Grainey
- Captain: (Scotland) Oliver Mole
- League: Caledonia Midlands Three
- 2025/26: 1st (Champions)

Official website
- www.bannockburnrugby.co.uk

Bannockburn RFC is a rugby union club in the Scottish Rugby Union, playing in the Caledonia Midlands Three. The team is based in Bannockburn, near Stirling in central Scotland.

== History ==
Bannockburn Rugby Club was started by former pupils from St Modan's High School in Stirling. Playing under the banner of St Modans FPs until the name was changed in 1996 to Bannockburn Rugby Club.

The club play their home matches at the Bluebellwood Clubhouse in Bannockburn with one senior XV side, as well as a mini/midi setup.

The club played their first match in 1979 against HMS Neptune and entered the Midland league in 1980 until they joined the Glasgow set up in 1982 where they stayed until 1994 before rejoining the Midlands set up.

In the 2000–01 season the club reached the heady heights of the National leagues for the first time in their history.

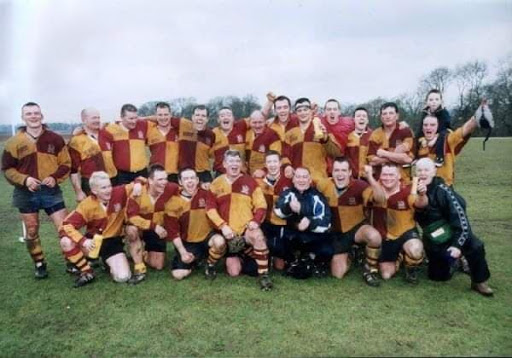
2000 promotion winning team

The club has produced some players who have since gone onto greater things with other clubs, namely Newcastle Prop George Graham and Scotland B player Eddie Pollock.

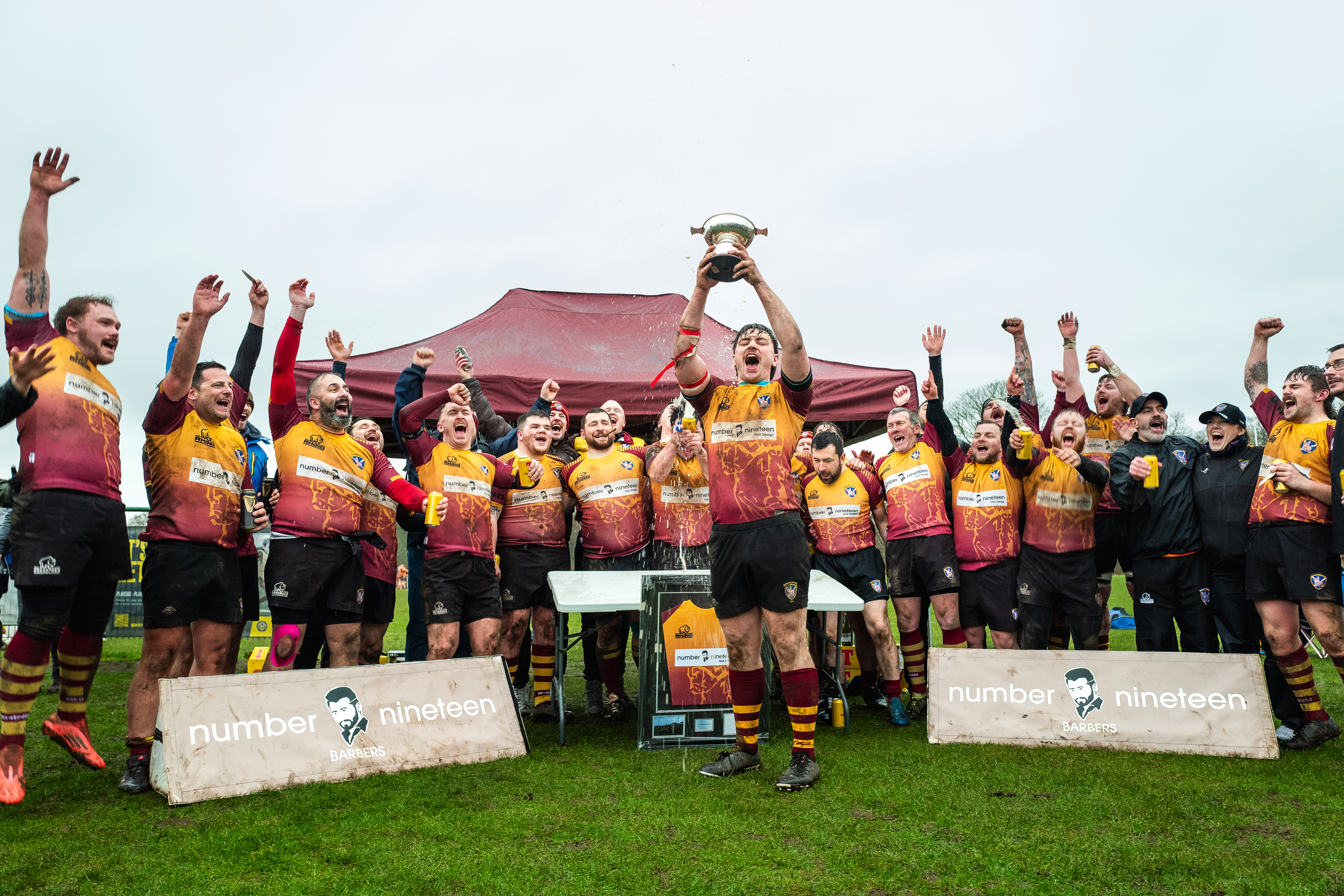
Bannockburn captain Oli Mole lifts the Caledonia Midlands Three trophy in February 2026.

The club has firmly committed to youth players, forging links with local schools whilst operating the thriving junior set up aimed at bringing through players of the future from the local area and beyond. Bannockburn Rugby Club are founding members of the Forth Valley Association of Rugby Clubs.

2020 saw the relaunch of the club's seconds and social side, the Beavers.

In 2021, Bannockburn Rugby Club launched their very first women's side, the Bannockburn Valkyries.

In 2026, the men's first team sealed the Caledonia Midlands Division Three title with eleven wins from twelve games in the 2025/26 season.
