= Vale of Dryfe F.C. =

Former association football club in Scotland

Vale of Dryfe
- Nickname(s): the Vale
- Founded: 1896
- Dissolved: 1906
- Ground: Kintail Park
- Trainers: R. Steel and J. T. Cox (1903)
- Match secretary: James Jardine
Home colours

Vale of Dryfe F.C. was an association football club from Lockerbie, Dumfriesshire, active at the turn of the 20th century.

== History ==
The club was formed at a meeting on 16 November 1896, to provide a Junior club for the town, after the demise of the original Mid-Annandale club; William Gardner was elected first captain. Its first competitive football came in the Southern Counties Cup, which it entered in 1896–97, and it lost 5–1 to Dumfries Thistle in a replay of its first tie. The Vale protested that Thistle's Gordon was Cup-tied for having played for the 5th K.R.V. in the Scottish Cup, in vain.

The Vale was one of the ten clubs to sign up for the new Southern Counties League in June 1897, but it withdrew before the competition started.

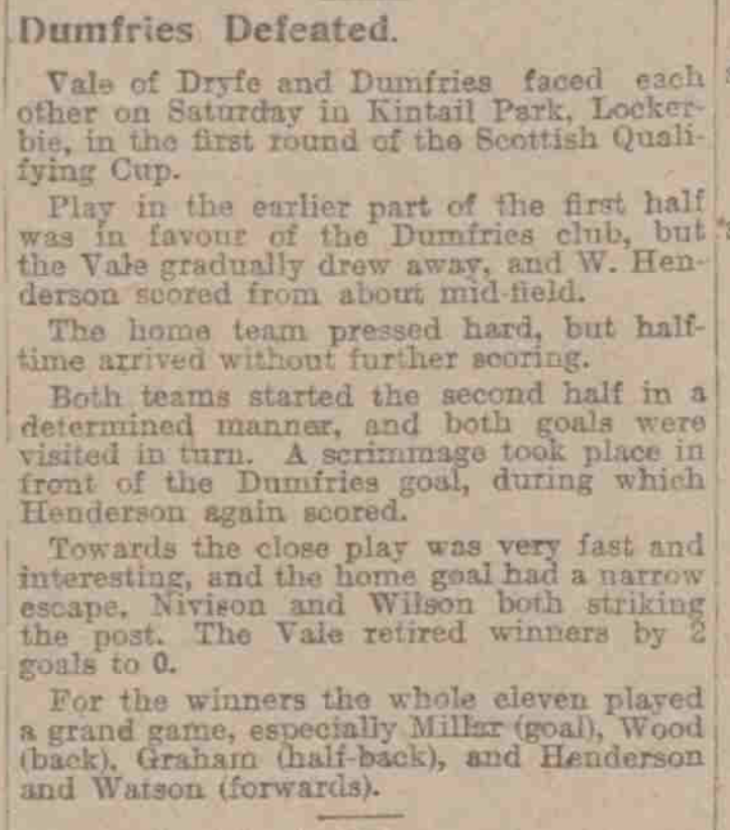
1905–06 Scottish Qualifying Cup 1st Round, Vale of Dryfe 2–0 Dumfries, Scottish Referee, 4 September 1905

The Vale had a run of success between 1901 and 1904 at local level. It won the Southern Counties Consolation Cup for the first time in 1901–02, with a 2–1 win over Douglas Wanderers at Palmerston Park. It successfully retained the trophy in 1902–03, by beating the 6th G.R.V. 2–0, and surviving a protest about player eligibility.

Off the back of that success, the club recruited two coaches, and joined the Scottish Football Association in May 1903. This entitled the club to play in the Scottish Qualifying Cup, and the club lost to Dumfries in a first round tie, replayed after the Vale had successfully protested that Dumfries' McClure had not been transferred from Maxwelltown Volunteers. The Vale gained a revenge by beating Dumfries in the Southern Counties Cup, and reached the final of the tournament for the only time, but lost 4–1 to Nithsdale Wanderers, the club hindered by centre-half Bill Alston being carried off when the score was 1–1.

The extra expense of senior membership proved deleterious to the club. It never won another tie in either the Counties Cup or the Consolation Cup, and lost in the first round of the 1904–05 Qualifying Cup. The club came close to disbanding in 1905, with only a small balance at hand and finding "in these days of professionalism some trouble to make both ends meet", but it did retain most of its players for one last tilt in 1905–06. The efforts were rewarded with a 2–0 win over Dumfries in the first round of the Qualifying Cup, considered "one of the greatest surprises of the round" (the inevitable protest - about one of the goals coming from a wrongly-awarded penalty - was dismissed unanimously). The Vale was hammered 8–0 by Nithsdale Wanderers in the second, key player Alston having been lured away by Liverpool for a trial.

The effort was too much for the club - it withdrew from the Potts Cup in December 1905 before playing a tie and its final recorded match was a 3–1 defeat on New Year's Day 1906 at Penrith. It was thrown out of the Scottish FA roll in August 1906 and the club was dissolved the same month, a new junior club (Mid-Annandale Amateurs) being founded to replace the senior club, playing at the same ground and wearing the same colours.

== Colours ==
The club wore black and gold.

== Ground ==
The club's first ground was a park owned by a Mr Baird of Broomhouses. It later played at Kintail Park, although it is not certain whether this was the same ground.

== Honours ==
- South of Scotland Cup
  - Runner-up: 1903–04
- South of Scotland Consolation Cup
  - Winner: 1901–02, 1902–03

== Notable players ==
- J. Maclaren, the club's centre-forward in the 1900s, was an Irish junior international.
- Bill Alston, who went on to play for Lincoln City in 1907–08.
- Angus Douglas, who moved to Dumfries on the club's dissolution, and later played for Chelsea.
