= Angus Douglas =

Scottish footballer

Personal information
- Full name: Angus Douglas
- Date of birth: 1 January 1889
- Place of birth: Lochmaben, Scotland
- Date of death: 14 December 1918 (aged 29)
- Place of death: Castle Ward, England
- Height: 5 ft 8 1/2 in (1.74 m)
- Position: Outside right

Senior career*
Years	Team	Apps	(Gls)
- Lochmaben
–1906	Vale of Dryfe		
1906–1908	Dumfries		
1906	→ Kilmarnock (loan)		
1908	→ Raith Rovers (loan)		
1908–1913	Chelsea	96	(11)
1913–1918	Newcastle United	49	(2)

International career
1911	Scotland	1	(0)
- * Club domestic league appearances and goals

Angus Douglas (1 January 1889 – 14 December 1918) was a Scottish professional footballer who made over 140 appearances in the Football League for Chelsea and Newcastle United as an outside right. He was capped by Scotland at international level.

== Club career ==
A "tricky" outside right, Douglas began his career in Scotland with local clubs Lochmaben and Vale of Dryfe. He transferred to Dumfries in 1906. In May 1908, Douglas moved to England to join First Division club Chelsea. He made 103 appearances and scored 11 goals in 4 1/2 years at Stamford Bridge and was a part of the club's 1911–12 Second Division promotion-winning team. After failing to appear at all during the early months of the 1913–14 season, Douglas transferred to First Division club Newcastle United for a fee "a shade under £2,000" in November 1913. He made 56 appearances and scored two goals for the club before the cessation of competitive football due to the outbreak of the First World War.

== International career ==
Douglas won one cap for Scotland, in a 2–0 British Home Championship victory over Ireland in March 1911.

== Personal life ==
While a footballer for Newcastle United, Douglas lived in Gosforth. He worked as a shell machinist for the Elswick Ordnance Company in Newcastle upon Tyne during the First World War. Douglas began a relationship with local girl Nancy Thompson and their daughter Betty was born on 3 April 1918. Both died of Spanish flu, within three days of each other, in December 1918, one month after the Armistice. Their daughter Betty, then an orphan, was raised by a maternal aunt.

== Career statistics ==
Appearances and goals by club, season and competition
Club	Season	League			National Cup		Total	
Club	Season	Division	Apps	Goals	Apps	Goals	Apps	Goals
Chelsea	1908–09	First Division	7	1	0	0	7	1
Chelsea	1909–10	First Division	14	2	0	0	14	2
Chelsea	1910–11	Second Division	24	6	6	0	30	6
Chelsea	1911–12	Second Division	35	2	1	0	36	2
Chelsea	1912–13	First Division	16	1	0	0	16	1
Chelsea	Total		96	11	7	0	103	11
Newcastle United	1913–14	First Division	22	1	1	0	23	1
Newcastle United	1914–15	First Division	27	1	6	0	33	1
Newcastle United	Total		49	2	7	0	56	2
Career total			145	13	14	0	159	13

== Honours ==
Chelsea

- Football League Second Division second-place promotion: 1911–12
