= Inter County Football League =

Supplementary football league formed in Scotland

Inter County League
- Founded: 1905
- Abolished: 1917
- Region: Scotland
- Teams: 4–5
- Last champions: Dumbarton Harp (1st title)
- Most championships: Dumbarton Harp (1 title)

The Inter County Football League was formed in 1905 in Scotland as one of several supplementary football leagues that were created in order to increase the number of fixtures for Scottish Football League clubs.

Member clubs of the original competition included Abercorn (1904–1906), Albion Rovers (1904–1906), Arthurlie (1904–1905), Ayr (1904–1906) and Vale of Leven (1905–1906). In the two seasons it was played, not all of the fixtures were played and the championship was withheld.

The competition was played out in a knockout format in 1906–07, known that season as the Inter County Shield, but, again, the competition was unfinished because the final was never played.

The competition was re-formed in 1916–17 with Albion Rovers, Dumbarton Harp, Queen's Park Strollers XI, Renton and Stevenston United. Dykehead, Royal Albert and Wishaw Thistle all resigned.

== See also ==
- Scottish Football (Defunct Leagues)
