= Kimmeter Park Green =

Football ground in Annan, Scotland

- Location within Dumfries and Galloway
- Location: Annan, Scotland
- Coordinates: 54.9880°N 3.2413°W
- Surface: Grass

Construction
- Opened: 1921
- Closed: 1939

Tenant
- Solway Star

Kimmeter Park Green was a football ground in Annan, Scotland. It was the home ground of Solway Star from 1921 until 1939, and hosted Scottish Football League matches between 1923 and 1926.

== History ==
Solway Star moved to Kimmeter Park Green in 1921 from their Summergate Park ground, which they had played at for only a year. The facilities at the new ground initially included a small stand on the western side of the pitch, as well as some changing rooms, and in 1923 a new 300-capacity grandstand was built. In the same year the club were elected into the new Third Division of the Scottish Football League, and the first SFL match at Kimmeter Park Green was played on 25 August 1923, a 2–1 win over Peebles Rovers. The club's highest recorded league attendance at the ground was 3,000, set for a match against Queen of the South on 11 October 1924; the match ending in a 1–1 draw.

Division Three was disbanded at the end of the 1925–26 season, resulting in Solway Star leaving the league. The final SFL match at the ground was played on 3 April 1926, a 3–2 defeat by Johnstone.

The club ceased playing at the ground in 1939, moving to Mafeking Park after World War II. The site of Kimmeter Park Green was returned to agricultural use; the grandstand was partially demolished and the remainder of the structure used as a cowshed.
