= Glasgow and West of Scotland Football League =

Glasgow and West of Scotland League
- Founded: 1898
- Abolished: 1907
- Region: Scotland
- Teams: 6–8
- Last champions: Clyde (2nd title)
- Most championships: Clyde (2 titles); Kilmarnock (2 titles); Morton (2 titles)

The Glasgow and West of Scotland Football League was formed in 1898 as one of several supplementary football leagues that operated at the time to give extra fixtures to the various Scottish Football League sides.

The league folded in 1906 when the Scottish League's First Division expanded to 18 clubs.

== Original members ==
The eight original members were Abercorn, Ayr Parkhouse (not a Scottish League side), Kilmarnock, Linthouse, Morton, Partick Thistle, Port Glasgow Athletic and St Mirren.

== Membership ==
- Abercorn 1898–1899
- Airdrieonians 1902–1903
- Ayr Parkhouse 1898–1899
- Clyde 1899–1906
- Hamilton Academical 1903–1906
- Kilmarnock 1898–1906
- Linthouse 1898–1899
- Morton 1898–1906
- Motherwell 1902–1906
- Partick Thistle 1898–1902
- Port Glasgow Athletic 1898–1906
- St Mirren 1898–1902

== Champions ==
- 1898–99 St Mirren
- 1899–1900 Morton / Kilmarnock (shared)
- 1900–01 Morton
- 1901–02 Port Glasgow Athletic
- 1902–03 Motherwell
- 1903–04 Port Glasgow Athletic
- 1904–05 Clyde
- 1905–06 Kilmarnock

== Glasgow and West of Scotland Shield ==
In 1907 a tournament was staged to determine which club would keep the championship shield for good. Clyde defeated Hamilton Accies in the final, 3–2 on aggregate over two legs.

== See also ==
- Scottish Football (Defunct Leagues)
