= Renfrewshire Football League =

Renfrewshire League
- Founded: 1894
- Abolished: 1895
- Region: Scotland
- Number of teams: 5
- Last champions: Morton (1st title)
- Most successful club(s): Morton (1 title)

The Renfrewshire Football League was a one-off Scottish Football competition played between March and September 1895. The intention was to have all the major Renfrewshire clubs competing. Arthurlie and Abercorn were invited but in the event only three clubs, all from the Scottish Football League, agreed to take part, meaning that only six matches took place.

== League table ==
Team	Pld	W	D	L	GF	GA	Pts
Morton	4	2	1	1	9	9	5
Port Glasgow Athletic	4	2	0	2	15	11	4
St Mirren	4	1	1	2	8	12	3

== See also ==
- Defunct leagues in Scottish football
