= Barholm Rovers F.C. =

Former association football club in Scotland

Barholm Rovers
- Full name: Barholm Rovers Football Club
- Nickname(s): Sons of Granite
- Founded: 1884
- Dissolved: 1905
- Ground: Cassencarrie Park 1884–1894; Barholm Park 1894–1905
- League: Stewartry Football League
Home colours

Barholm Rovers Football Club was an association football club based in Creetown, Dumfries & Galloway.

== History ==
The club was formed in 1884 and was an original member of the Stewartry Football League based in Kirkcudbrightshire which started in 1894–95. Its stay in the Stewartry League was short-lived as it was replaced by the 6th G.R.V. for the start of the 1896–97 season.

In 1900 Rovers amalgamated with Ellangowan Swifts, a club from Carsluith which had tried (but failed) to join the Scottish Football Association in 1899, but retained the name of Barholm Rovers. This new side won through the Scottish Qualifying Cup in 1902–03 to play in the first round proper of the Scottish Cup. It was drawn away to Dundee, but Rovers failed to honour the fixture and the Taysiders were awarded the tie by a walkover.

The club folded in 1905 but was immediately replaced by a new club, Creetown Rifle Volunteers Football Club, a forerunner to the current South of Scotland Football League club, Creetown.

== Colours ==
Rovers played in a number of colour combinations through their short history including black and white, black and amber stripes with navy shorts and eventually maroon.

== Ground ==
Rovers played their home games originally at Cassencarrie Park (now known as Castle Cary Park), but after 1894 they moved to Barholm Park in Creetown.
