= Inter City Midweek Football League =

Inter City Midweek League
- Founded: 1912
- Abolished: 1913
- Region: Scotland
- Number of teams: 6
- Last champions: none
- Most successful club(s): none

The Inter City Midweek Football League was one of several Scottish supplementary football leagues run in the 1912–13 season.

Because Wednesday was the only day that shopworkers in Scotland had off, it was decided to form a Midweek League for their benefit. Six top Scottish Football League clubs entered teams, but the competition was abandoned in November 1912 after only four rounds because of disappointing attendances.

== Table ==
Team	Pld	W	D	L	GF	GA	Pts
Rangers	4	3	0	1	11	6	6
Dundee	4	2	1	1	8	5	5
Hibernian	4	2	0	2	7	5	4
Aberdeen	4	2	0	2	7	10	4
Celtic	4	1	1	2	4	9	3
Heart of Midlothian	4	1	0	3	5	7	2

== Results ==
15 October 1912	Rangers	5 – 2	Aberdeen
16 October 1912	Dundee	3 – 1	Heart of Midlothian
	Hibernian	2 – 3	Celtic
23 October 1912	Heart of Midlothian	3 – 0	Rangers
	Aberdeen	0 – 2	Hibernian
	Celtic	0 – 2	Dundee
29 October 1912	Rangers	2 – 1	Hibernian
30 October 1912	Heart of Midlothian	1 – 0	Aberdeen
	Dundee	1 – 1	Celtic
5 November 1912	Rangers	4 – 0	Celtic
6 November 1912	Aberdeen	3 – 2	Dundee
	Hibernian	2 – 0	Heart of Midlothian
