= Solway Star F.C. =

Former association football club in Scotland

Solway Star
- Full name: Solway Star Football Club
- Nickname(s): the Star
- Founded: 1911
- Dissolved: 1947
- Ground: Kimmeter Park Green, Annan
Home colours

Solway Star Football Club were a football club based in Annan, Scotland, playing their home games at Kimmeter Park Green. The club were members of the Scottish Football League Third Division.

== History ==
Founded in 1911 Star concentrated on friendlies for much of their early years as league competition was unpopular in the south west of Scotland. They managed only two seasons in the Southern Counties Football League before joining the Western League for a single season. This league was incorporated by the Scottish Football League as its new Third Division for the 1923–24 season. Solway Star lasted the Division's three seasons, finishing 11th, 3rd (missing promotion on goal difference) and 11th, but were not retained by the League. They continued until 1928 when they were wound up.

A single season in the Scottish Football Alliance with the club also competing in the South of Scotland Football League. They returned to their earlier cup games and friendlies status in 1933 and carried on until 1947.

In 2020, local band 13 Crowes released an album titled "Solway Star".

== Former players ==
1. Players that have played/managed in the Scottish Football League or any foreign equivalent to this level (i.e. fully professional league).
2. Players with full international caps.
3. Players that hold a club record or have captained the club.

- (Scotland) James Kerr
