= West of Scotland Amateur Football League =

- Founded: 1898
- Folded: 2017
- Country: Scotland
- Confederation: UEFA
- Divisions: Premier Division
- Number of clubs: 7
- Level on pyramid: N/A
- Domestic cup(s): Scottish Amateur Cup; West of Scotland Cup
- Website: Official website

The West of Scotland Amateur Football League (WoSAFL) was a football league competition, primarily for amateur clubs in the west of Scotland. It was formed in 1898 and claimed to be the oldest amateur league in world football. The association was affiliated to the Scottish Amateur Football Association.

As a stand-alone Association and not part of Scotland's pyramid system, the Premier Division did not act as a feeder league.

With reducing membership, the league folded after the 2016–17 season.

== Member Clubs ==
As of the final season in 2016–17, the West of Scotland AFL contained seven member clubs in a single division.

- Bellaire
- Cardross
- Carradale
- Helensburgh
- Newshot
- South Lochaber Thistle
- United Glasgow
