= Thornhill F.C. =

Former association football club in Scotland

Thornhill
- Full name: Thornhill Football Club
- Nickname(s): the Ducal Team
- Founded: 1883
- Dissolved: 1935
- Ground: Showfield Park
Home colours

Thornhill F.C. was an association football club from Thornhill in Dumfriesshire.

== History ==
The club was founded in 1883, and played in local five-a-side tournaments; in 1884, the club took over Drumlanrig Rangers, which had been founded in 1877 and which had taken part in the Scottish Cup in 1883–84, losing in its only match in the competition to fellow Dumfriesshire side East End Rovers.

The club is notable for playing in the main rounds of the Scottish Cup 14 times, without ever winning. The club's first entry, in 1884–85, saw the club suffer its record Cup defeat, losing 13–0 to Queen of the South Wanderers.

The club avoided defeat in matches in the main rounds on only two occasions. The first time was against the Vale o' Nith, with whom East End had merged, in 1888–89. This was however because the game ended (while the score was 2–2) when the referee walked off, having been "caught by the throat" by a Thornhill player. Thornhill had four players suspended in the aftermath - Marchbanks for 6 months and M'Credie, Graham, and M'Lachlan for 3 - and rather than play a replay, Thornhill withdrew.

The second time was at home to Clyde in 1923–24; the 0–0 draw was watched by 2,000 spectators. The club went from Showfield to Shawfield for the replay, in front of another 2,000 crowd, but this time Clyde won with ease, Brown and Ballantyne both scoring in each half. The following season, the club lost 12–1 at Brechin City, the latter club's record victory.

The club's best run in the Scottish Qualifying Cup was to the final in 1928–29, where the club met Murrayfield Amateurs F.C., which was entering the competition for the first time. Thornhill was hammered 8–1 in the final at Ibrox Park, before 4,000 spectators; it marked both the first time that an amateur club had won the Qualifying Cup, and the first time that a club had won the competition in its first entry. To Thornhill's misfortune, the clubs were drawn together in the first round proper, the Amateurs winning again despite Thornhill's home advantage.

On a local level, the club was a member of various attempts at the Southern Counties League, although none of the league competitions was played on a regular basis until the club's final season, in 1930–31; Thornhill finished 7th out of 9 and did not enter again. The club also entered the Southern Counties Cup from 1891 to 1935, after which there is no record of the club playing. The club's best showing was reaching the final for the only time in 1926–27, where the club lost 3–1 to Stranraer.

== Colours ==
Thornhill originally played in blue shirts, but after the merger with Drumlanrig Rangers, the club took on the Rangers' navy outfit. The club's most familiar colour was blue shirts, but the club also wore the following:

- 1886–88: white shirt, navy shorts
- 1888–90: black and white vertical stripes
- 1897–1905: red
- 1922–26: green and white

== Ground ==
The club played at Drumlanrig's Tibbers Holm ground until moving to Kirkbog Farm at an unknown date, and in 1891 the club moved to Showfield Park, which remained its ground until the club's end.
