= 6th Galloway Rifle Volunteers F.C. =

Former association football club in Scotland

6th Galloway Rifle Volunteers Football Club
- Full name: 6th Galloway Rifle Volunteers Football Club
- Nickname(s): Granite Toon, the Black and Red
- Founded: 1892
- Dissolved: 1908
- Ground: Maidenholm Park, Dalbeattie
Home colours

The 6th Galloway Rifle Volunteers Football Club was a football team based in Dalbeattie, Scotland.

== History ==
The 6th Kirkcudbrightshire Rifle Volunteers were formed on 23 June 1869 in response to increasing unrest within Continental Europe and the British Empire. In 1880 the battalion was renamed as H Company of the Galloway Rifle Volunteer Corps. The division was based in Dalbeattie, Dumfries until the re-organisation of private militias in 1908 when all volunteer forces in Galloway were absorbed into the Territorial Forces and the 5th King's Own Scottish Borderers Regiment.

The football club was founded in 1892, retaining the old number but keeping the new geographical designation; it was originally in the shadow of the 5th KRV, with regimental members often preferring to play for the 5th or its reserves. Within a year the club was therefore split when those who preferred to admit non-volunteers left, and both sections tusselled over the right to the name 6th G.R.V., ultimately won by the splitters. The club thence enjoyed a fierce rivalry with Douglas Wanderers F.C., by 1897 disputing the unofficial title of the best club in the south of Scotland with the Wanderers, matches said to be "in dog-fight order".

The club's first success was reaching the final of the Stewartry Cup, a competition for second XIs and junior teams in Kirkcudbrightshire, in 1894, losing to the Barholm Rovers of Creetown. The club had already entered the Scottish Cup for the first time at the start of the 1893–94 season, and admitted non-Volunteer members, but scratched before its first tie.

=== Scottish Cup ===
The club became a senior member of the Scottish Football Association in 1896, and won through to the first round proper of the Cup four times, albeit losing every time; the club's most notable opponent was Celtic in 1898–99, losing 8–1 at home in front of a crowd of a mere 700. The club's final appearance in the first round came in 1904–05, when the club was drawn at home to Cowdenbeath F.C., but switched the tie after a financial inducement.

The 1905–06 Scottish Cup was the club's final entry; it gained its biggest competition win, 11–1 over Garlieston, but it does not seem to have played any matches after losing in the Southern Counties Cup first round at the start of the 1907–08 season, and the club was definitely defunct after the Volunteer movements were absorbed elsewhere in 1908.

=== Other competitions ===
The club played in the Stewartry League in 1896–97, finishing as champions, but the League only had three entrants, and the two other entrants did not play their final match. The following season the club started in the Southern Counties League, but resigned after one match.

The leading local competition in the club's early years was the Law Cup, for clubs in Wigtownshire and Kirkcudbrightshire, awarded by T. Law of Castle Douglas, and the Volunteers were winners in 1896–97 and 1900–01, although by this time it was subordinate to the Southern Counties Cup. The club won the Southern Counties Consolation Cup, for clubs eliminated in the earlier rounds, in 1898–99.

== Colours ==
The club played in light blue for its first two seasons, changing to red and black shirts with navy knickers in 1894.

== Ground ==
The club originally played at The Flatts, moving to Maidenholm Park in the 1890s.

== Notable players ==
- Peter Burns, player for Hibernian F.C. in 1898–99
- Bob McCartney, player for Rangers F.C. in 1898–99
