= Douglas Wanderers F.C. =

Former association football club in Scotland

Douglas Wanderers
- Full name: Douglas Wanderers Football Club
- Nickname(s): the Wanderers
- Founded: 1886
- Dissolved: 1936
- Ground: Meadow Park
Home colours

Douglas Wanderers F.C. was an association football club from Castle Douglas in Dumfriesshire.

== History ==
The club was founded in 1893; there are matches recorded for a club called Castle Douglas Wanderers from 1886 to 1890, playing on the Commons, but, as Douglas Wanderers held a first anniversary celebration in 1894, this refers to a different club.

The club entered the Scottish FA Cup from 1896–97 to 1934–35. It won through the qualifying rounds to play in the first round proper on seven occasions; it once won through to round 2, in 1902–03, beating Abercorn in a replay in the first round. Its tie in the second round with Stenhousemuir F.C. was abandoned in the first half (along with a number of other ties on the same day) because of a storm that hit southern Scotland, and the Warriors beat the Wanderers 6–1 in the postponed tie.

In local cup competitions, the club's greatest successes came in the Potts Cup, aimed primarily at clubs in Dumfriesshire, which the club won twice. In the better-regarded Southern Counties Cup, the club never reached the final, but did win the Consolation Cup three times.

The club played in the little-regarded Stewartry League in Kirkcudbrightshire from 1894 to 1897, and the Southern Counties league on occasion between 1897 and 1935. The club won the title once, in 1910–11. After 5 matches in 1934–35, the club withdrew from the League and its last activity was entering the Southern Counties Cup in 1936.

After the club's demise, a juvenile club of the same name started in West Lothian, although it appears to have no links with the Castle Douglas club.

== Colours ==
The club's colours were black and white vertical striped jerseys, other than between 1897 and 1905, when the club played in maroon and white.

== Ground ==
The club played at the following grounds:

- 1893–95: Kilmichael Park
- 1895–1902: Show Field
- 1902–05: Kilmichael Park
- 1905–09: Balmoral Park
- 1909–10: Meadow Park
- 1910–13: Balmoral Park
- 1913–35: Meadow Park

== Notable players ==
- Charlie Bell, future manager of Sporting Lisbon and Olympique de Marseille, played for the club in the early 1910s.
