= Whithorn F.C. =

Association football club in Dumfries and Galloway, Scotland

Whithorn
- Full name: Whithorn Football Club
- Founded: 1884
- Dissolved: 1969
- Ground: Belmont Park until 1896, St Johns Park 1903–1969; Whithorn, Scotland
- League: Wigtownshire Amateur League; 1923–1925; Southern Counties Football League; 1932–1937; South of Scotland Football League; 1946–1959, 1962–1963, 1964–1969
Home colours

Whithorn Football Club were a football team from the town of Whithorn, Scotland in The Machars in the historical county of Wigtownshire in Dumfries and Galloway, Scotland. The club was formed in 1884 but was dogged by financial and player difficulties throughout its history and closed down on a number of occasions, including 1896–1903 and 1936–1938, before finally dissolving in 1969. Their place in the South of Scotland Football League was taken up by the Castle Douglas side, Threave Rovers.

The team played their homes games initially at Belmont Park, but more latterly at St Johns Park. Club colours were maroon and white. Between 1923 and 1936 Whithorn appeared in seven cup finals but lost on each occasion. Their one and only victory in the Scottish Cup was during the 1955–56 season, when they defeated Vale of Leithen 7–0 at home before losing a five-goal thriller 3–2 at Selkirk.

== Sources ==
Pagan, Malcolm. Senior Non League Football in South West Scotland. Stewart Davidson, Paisley. 1996
