= Stranraer F.C. =

Association football club in Scotland

Stranraer
- Full name: Stranraer Football Club
- Nickname: The Blues
- Founded: 1870; 156 years ago
- Ground: Stair Park, Stranraer
- Capacity: 4,178 (1,830 seated)
- Coordinates: 54.902179°N 5.01248°W
- Chairman: Iain Dougan
- Manager: Chris Aitken
- League: Scottish League Two
- 2025–26: Scottish League Two, 5th of 10
- Website: www.stranraerfc.org
Home colours	Away colours

Stranraer Football Club is a Scottish semi-professional football club based in the town of Stranraer in Dumfries and Galloway. The club was founded in 1870, making it the third-oldest football club in Scotland behind Queen's Park and Kilmarnock and one of the 20 oldest in the world. The club currently competes in Scottish League Two as a member of the Scottish Professional Football League.

They have won the Scottish Second Division on two occasions, most recently in 1997–98, as well as coming runners-up in 2004–05 and 2014–15. Their only national cup final came in 1996, when the club defeated First Division champions St Johnstone 1–0 in the Scottish Challenge Cup final.

Stranraer's home ground is Stair Park, which has the capacity to seat around 1,830 spectators and a total of 4,178 including standing. The ground was opened in 1907 and is located in the east of Stranraer.

== History ==
Stranraer were founded in 1870 and play their football at Stair Park. Most of Stranraer's football was played under Southern Counties auspices until, in 1949, the club was admitted to C Division where they came up against the reserve sides of the established league clubs. However they had taken part in the Scottish Cup since their debut in the national tournament in 1877–78. In 1955 C Division was abolished and the Blues found themselves in B Division and playing first team league football. They would remain in the bottom tier until their first-ever promotion eventually arrived under the club's legendary manager Alex McAnespie in 1993–94.

With the league reformation at the end of the 1993–94 season, champions Stranraer found themselves leapfrogging six relegated teams and playing in the new First Division in season 1994–95, finishing last, with only 17 points from 36 games. With Campbell Money at the helm Stranraer spent three seasons in the Second Division before winning promotion back to the First Division at the end of the 1997–98 season. Once again, they finished bottom of the league, with the same points total as before and 29 defeats. During that season a notable league win was secured at Easter Road against Hibernian. During Money's reign the club lifted the Scottish League Challenge Cup, defeating St Johnstone 1–0 at Broadwood on 3 November 1996. Saints' Danny Griffin was the unfortunate scorer of an own goal.

The club, now under the management of Billy McLaren, then spent a further four years in the Second Division, with the most notable event being a strong Scottish Cup run in season 2002–03, which saw them go to the quarter finals, where they were beaten 4–0 by SPL side Motherwell. However, the team's cup run did not reflect their league form, as they finished ninth in the Second Division, and thus were relegated to the Third Division for season 2003–04. The team's fortunes improved from there as, under Neil Watt, they won the Third Division at the first attempt, gaining promotion back to the Second Division. In season 2004–05, the team stayed in the top two for most of the campaign. A 1–1 draw with closest promotion rivals Morton on 30 April 2005 saw them gain promotion to the First Division for the third time, although they were relegated to the Second Division the following season after finishing ninth and losing out in the play-offs to Partick Thistle.

The team had a largely unsuccessful campaign in 2006–07, with heavy defeats by relegation rivals Peterhead and Forfar Athletic. They finished ninth, which resulted in a play-off with Third Division promotion contenders East Fife. A 4–2 aggregate defeat (despite winning the second leg 1–0) saw them relegated to the Third Division.

On 21 January 2009, club chairman Nigel Redhead stated that Stranraer owed £250,000, and had a 50–50 chance of survival to the end of the season. In response, on 22 January 2009, a small consortium launched the Friends of Stranraer F.C. to try to secure the club's future through donations from the football community at stranraerfc.com. On 23 January 2009, as part of efforts to reduce costs to a manageable level, key player Gregory Tade transferred to Clyde. On 24 January 2009, Stirling Albion defeated Stranraer 8–2. Shortly after the game, Stranraer and team manager Derek Ferguson parted company by mutual consent and Keith Knox took over the reins. On 4 April 2009, after a 3–0 loss to Raith Rovers, Stranraer's relegation to Division Three was confirmed, meaning the club had played in a different division for each of their last eight seasons.

On 23 July 2011, they lost 8–0 to Morton in a Ramsdens Challenge Cup game. A year later, they lost 8–0 at home again, this time in the Scottish League Cup against Livingston.

The 2012 financial problems of Scottish Premier League side, Rangers, and the subsequent decision by SPL clubs to expel Rangers from the SPL, led to Scottish Football League member clubs voting Rangers into the Third Division. This meant that an additional team from each tier of Scottish football was promoted for the 2012–13 season. As Stranraer were runners up in the previous season's third division promotion play-offs, they were promoted to the Second Division. They secured their place in the third tier of Scottish football after a 2–1 win at Stenhousemuir on the final day of the season, but only after Stephen Aitken had taken over from Knox in October.

The club then settled well in the third tier under manager Stephen Aitken, finishing third behind full-time Rangers and Dunfermline Athletic in 2013–14 and second behind full-time Morton the following season. Stranraer's Boxing Day draw at Ibrox in 2013 saw the club scoring their first goal against Rangers and taking their first point off the Glasgow club. In both of these seasons, however, they were knocked out of the promotion play-offs at the semi-final stage. During this spell the club also performed well in the cups – defeating Ross County in the League Cup, taking Inverness to a Scottish Cup replay, and only losing out on penalties to Livingston in the semi-final of the Petrofac Challenge Cup. Aitken impressed to the extent that he was recruited by Championship side Dumbarton in May 2015 and was quickly replaced by former Ayr United manager Brian Reid. Stranraer started the 2015–16 season horrendously and were bottom of the table at Christmas. A great run afterwards, however, saw them finish 4th and qualify for the promotion play-offs for a third successive season.

This was the seventh time Stranraer had taken part in a relegation/promotion play-off in only 11 years of the system's implementation. They failed to achieve their target in the first six times, although in 2008 and 2012 they eventually achieved promotion as losing finalists because of another club's misfortune. In the semi-finals they faced Livingston, who had finished 9th in the Scottish Championship. They were victorious 5–2 at Stair Park but two late goals for Livingston in the second leg made it 6–6 on aggregate (away goals not counting in the playoffs), forcing extra time. Stranraer scored twice to lose the match 4–3 and win 8–6 on aggregate. They faced Ayr United in the two-legged finals for a place in the second tier.

Stranraer drew 1–1 with Ayr in the first leg at Stair Park, with a late goal from Ayr's Ross Docherty to deny Stranraer a first-leg advantage. The second leg finished 0–0 with the game being decided on penalties, Ayr winning 3–1 and being promoted ahead of Stranraer.

2016–17 also started dreadfully for Stranraer and, following a 1–0 January defeat at Stenhousemuir which saw the hosts leapfrog the Blues at the foot of the table, Reid departed to be replaced by Stephen Farrell as manager.

Stranraer had a poor 2023–24 season, finishing bottom of Scottish League Two and facing East Kilbride in a two-legged promotion/relegation play-off. A 2–2 draw away from home meant that Stranraer needed to win at Stair Park to avoid dropping into non-league football. A 3–1 extra-time win sparked a pitch invasion from 1,800 Stranraer supporters, their largest support in almost a decade.

=== Season-by-season record ===
Season	Division	Level	Position	Scottish Cup	Notes
1877–78				1R	
1878–79				1R	
1879–80				2R	
1880–81				2R	
1881–82				4R	
1890–91				3R	
1913–14	Wigtownshire League	-			
1924–25	Southern Counties League	-			
1928–29	Southern Counties League Northern Section	-	1st/5		
1929–30	Southern Counties League	-	2nd/5		
1930–31	Southern Counties League	-	3rd/9		
1931–32	Southern Counties League	-			
1933–34	Southern Counties League	-	3rd/9		
1934–35	Southern Counties League	-	2nd/8		
1935–36	Scottish Combination	-	8th/10		
1936–37	Scottish Combination	-	4th/7		
1946–47	South of Scotland Football League West Division	-	1st/6		
1947–48	South of Scotland Football League	-	3rd/9		
1948–49	South of Scotland Football League	-	1st/8		
1949–50	Scottish League Division C South West	3	8th/18		
1950–51	Scottish League Division C South West	3	6th/16		
1951–52	Scottish League Division C South West	3	4th/16		
1952–53	Scottish League Division C South West	3	7th/14		
1953–54	Scottish League Division C South West	3	3rd/14		
1954–55	Scottish League Division C South West	3	8th/13		Promoted
1955–56	Scottish League Division B	2	12th/19		
1956–57	Scottish League Second Division	2	7th/19		
1957–58	Scottish League Second Division	2	18th/19		
1958–59	Scottish League Second Division	2	16th/19		
1959–60	Scottish League Second Division	2	17th/19		
1960–61	Scottish League Second Division	2	4th/19		
1961–62	Scottish League Second Division	2	7th/19		
1962–63	Scottish League Second Division	2	5th/19		
1963–64	Scottish League Second Division	2	8th/19		
1964–65	Scottish League Second Division	2	6th/19		
1965–66	Scottish League Second Division	2	15th/19		
1966–67	Scottish League Second Division	2	15th/20		
1967–68	Scottish League Second Division	2	19th/19		
1968–69	Scottish League Second Division	2	18th/19		
1969–70	Scottish League Second Division	2	17th/19		
1970–71	Scottish League Second Division	2	9th/19		
1971–72	Scottish League Second Division	2	6th/19		
1972–73	Scottish League Second Division	2	15th/19		
1973–74	Scottish League Second Division	2	9th/19		
1974–75	Scottish League Second Division	2	14th/20		
1975–76	Scottish League Second Division	3	7th/14		
1976–77	Scottish League Second Division	3	4th/14		
1977–78	Scottish League Second Division	3	11th/14		
1978–79	Scottish League Second Division	3	9th/14		
1979–80	Scottish League Second Division	3	11th/14		
1980–81	Scottish League Second Division	3	14th/14		
1981–82	Scottish League Second Division	3	14th/14		
1982–83	Scottish League Second Division	3	12th/14		
1983–84	Scottish League Second Division	3	8th/14		
1984–85	Scottish League Second Division	3	11th/14		
1985–86	Scottish League Second Division	3	14th/14		
1986–87	Scottish League Second Division	3	10th/14		
1987–88	Scottish League Second Division	3	14th/14		
1988–89	Scottish League Second Division	3	11th/14		
1989–90	Scottish League Second Division	3	8th/14		
1990–91	Scottish League Second Division	3	6th/14		
1991–92	Scottish League Second Division	3	10th/14		
1992–93	Scottish League Second Division	3	3rd/14		
1993–94	Scottish League Second Division	3	1st/14		Promoted
1994–95	Scottish League First Division	2	10th/10		Relegated
1995–96	Scottish League Second Division	3	8th/10		
1996–97	Scottish League Second Division	3	8th/10		
1997–98	Scottish League Second Division	3	1st/10		Promoted
1998–99	Scottish League First Division	2	10th/10		Relegated
1999–2000	Scottish League Second Division	3	6th/10		
2000–01	Scottish League Second Division	3	4th/10		
2001–02	Scottish League Second Division	3	7th/10		
2002–03	Scottish League Second Division	3	9th/10		Relegated
2003–04	Scottish League Third Division	4	1st/10		Promoted
2004–05	Scottish League Second Division	3	2nd/10		Promoted
2005–06	Scottish League First Division	2	9th/10		Relegated
2006–07	Scottish League Second Division	3	9th/10		Relegated
2007–08	Scottish League Third Division	4	2nd/10		Promoted
2008–09	Scottish League Second Division	3	10th/10		Relegated
2009–10	Scottish League Third Division	4	7th/10		
2010–11	Scottish League Third Division	4	5th/10		
2011–12	Scottish League Third Division	4	3rd/10		Promoted
2012–13	Scottish League Second Division	3	8th/10		
2013–14	Scottish League One	3	3rd/10		
2014–15	Scottish League One	3	2nd/10		
2015–16	Scottish League One	3	4th/10		
2016–17	Scottish League One	3	7th/10		
2017–18	Scottish League One	3	5th/10		
2018–19	Scottish League One	3	8th/10		
2019–20	Scottish League One	3	10th/10		Relegated
2020–21	Scottish League Two	4	4th/10		
2021–22	Scottish League Two	4	6th/10		
2022–23	Scottish League Two	4	7th/10		
2023–24	Scottish League Two	4	10th/10		
2024–25	Scottish League Two	4	8th/10	3R	
Season	Division	Level	Position	Scottish Cup	Notes
Source: Football Club History Database

== Records ==
- Most league points in a season:
  - 58 (Second Division – 1993–94) (two points for a win)
  - 79 (Third Division – 2003–04) (three points for a win)
- Most league goals scored by a player in a season
  - Derek Frye 27, 1977–78
- Record attendance
  - 6,500 vs Rangers, 24 January 1948
- Record victory
  - 9–0 versus St Cuthbert Wanderers, 2010 (Scottish Cup) and vs Wigtown, 2011 (Scottish Cup)
- Record defeat
  - 1–11 versus Queen of the South, 1932

In 1990, Stranraer became the first side to win a Scottish Cup tie on penalties, defeating Kilmarnock 4–3 after a 0–0 draw in the second round replay.

The club hold the record for a shirt sponsorship deal. Stena Line have been on the front of the shirts since the start of 1996–97 season (and Sealink from 1988 to 1989). As the Sealink brand was renamed Stena Line, as of the start of the 2026–27 season the club's sponsor has remained the same for over 35 seasons, making it one of the longest-standing sponsorships in world football, and the current longest unbroken sponsorship record in UK football.

== Honours ==
=== League ===
- Scottish Second Division: (third tier)
  - Winners (2): 1993–94, 1997–98
  - Runners-up (2): 2004–05, 2014–15
- Scottish Third Division: (fourth tier)
  - Winners (1): 2003–04
  - Runners-up (1): 2007–08
- South of Scotland Football League:
  - Winners (16): 1948–49, 1959–60, 1960–61, 1961–62, 1965–66, 1966–67, 1967–68, 1969–70, 1972–73, 1973–74, 1974–75, 1975–76, 1976–77, 1981–82, 1982–83 and 2018–19°

° Reserve Team

=== Cups ===
- Scottish Challenge Cup:
  - Winners (1): 1996
- Scottish Qualifying Cup:
  - Winners (1): 1937–38
  - Runners-up (1): 1946–47

== Current squad ==
As of 1 October 2026

Note: Flags indicate national team as defined under FIFA eligibility rules; some limited exceptions apply. Players may hold more than one non-FIFA nationality.

No.	Pos.	Nation	Player
1	GK	SCO	Max Currie
2	DF	SCO	Evan Dunne
3	DF	SCO	Finn Ecrepont
4	DF	SCO	Mark McLuckie
5	DF	SCO	Kenzie Nair
6	MF	SCO	Jordan Stuart
7	MF	SCO	James Dolan
8	MF	SCO	Aaron Quigg
9	FW	ENG	Robbie Foster
10	MF	ENG	Dominic Plank
11	FW	SCO	Aaron Healy
12	MF	SCO	Archie Traynor (on loan from Kilmarnock)

No.	Pos.	Nation	Player
13	GK	SCO	Ewan Henderson
14	MF	SCO	Zach Bruce (co-operation loan with Hibernian)
15	MF	SCO	Ronan Hughes
16	FW	SCO	Lewis Dobbie
17	MF	SCO	Daniel McManus
18	DF	SCO	Edin Lynch
20	DF	SCO	Connor Cameron
21	DF	SCO	Lewis Gillie (co-operation loan with Hibernian)
22	DF	SCO	Bernard Coll (captain)
24	FW	ENG	Seb Mason (on loan from Carlisle United)
77	FW	SCO	Dean Cleland

=== On loan ===
Note: Flags indicate national team as defined under FIFA eligibility rules; some limited exceptions apply. Players may hold more than one non-FIFA nationality.

No.	Pos.	Nation	Player
23	FW	SCO	Murray Binnie (on loan at Bo'ness United)

== Club officials ==
=== Coaching staff ===
Position	Name
Manager	Chris Aitken
Assistant manager	Stephen Aitken
Goalkeeping coach	Jim Low
Head of youth development	Allan Jenkins
Physiotherapist	Kirsten Murray
Sports scientist	Nicole Watson
Club doctor	Carl Mullet
Kit manager	Michael McCloy

Ref:
