= Tarff Rovers F.C. =

Former association football club in Scotland

Tarff Rovers
- Full name: Tarff Rovers Football Club
- Nickname: The Rovers
- Founded: 1874
- Dissolved: 2003
- Ground: Balgreen Park, Kirkcowan
Home colours

Tarff Rovers Football Club are a defunct football club from Kirkcowan in Wigtownshire, Scotland.

One of Scotland's oldest clubs, they were formed in 1874 and were full members of both the Scottish Football Association and the Southern Counties Football Association. Having full SFA status entitled Rovers to compete in the Scottish Qualifying Cup South competition and, on occasion, play in the Scottish Cup proper.

The club's finest hour came in 1969 when they faced Scottish League side Alloa Athletic in the Scottish Cup. This home tie saw Tarff triumph by one goal to nil. Despite belonging to a remote and sparsely populated part of Scotland – indeed Kirkcowan's current population is less than 400 – Tarff enjoyed certain periods of success.

During their final few years of the club's existence, a local businessman's financial assistance led to several titles, cup wins, and big name signings, including Chic Charnley and Rowan Alexander.

The club folded in 2003 when local interest quickly dwindled to the point where a committee could not be formed. The club's home ground of Balgreen Park still exists, in an overgrown state but with goalposts and dugouts intact.
